= 2024 All-Big 12 Conference football team =

The 2024 All-Big 12 Conference football team consisted of American football players chosen as All-Big 12 Conference players for the 2024 Big 12 Conference football season. The conference recognizes two official All-Big 12 selectors: (1) the Big 12 conference coaches selected separate offensive and defensive units and named first- and second-team players (the "Coaches" team); and (2) a panel of sports writers and broadcasters covering the Big 12 also selected offensive and defensive units and named first- and second-team players (the "Media" team).

== Offensive selections ==
=== Quarterbacks ===
- Shedeur Sanders, Colorado (Coaches-1; Media-1)
- Sam Leavitt, Arizona State (Coaches-2; Media-2)

=== Running backs ===
- RJ Harvey, UCF (Coaches-1; Media-1)
- Cam Skattebo, Arizona State (Coaches-1; Media-1)
- Tahj Brooks, Texas Tech (Coaches-2; Media-2)
- DJ Giddens, Kansas State (Coaches-2)
- Devin Neal, Kansas (Coaches-2)

=== Fullbacks ===
- Jared Casey, Kansas (Coaches-1)
- Stevo Klotz, Iowa State (Coaches-2)

=== Centers ===
- Leif Fautanu, Arizona State (Media-1; Media-1)
- Bryce Foster, Kansas (Media-2; Media-2)

=== Guards ===
- Luke Kandra, Cincinnati (Coaches-1; Media-1)
- Wyatt Milum, West Virginia (Coaches-1; Media-1)
- Michael Ford Jr., Kansas (Coaches-2; Media-1)
- Omar Aigbedion, Baylor (Media-2)
- Sam Hecht, Kansas State (Coaches-2)
- Caleb Rogers, Texas Tech (Media-2)

=== Tackles ===
- Spencer Fano, Utah (Coaches-1; Media-1)
- Caleb Etienne, BYU (Coaches-1; Media-2)
- Logan Brown, Kansas (Coaches-2; Media-2)
- Easton Kilty, Kansas State (Coaches-2)

=== Tight ends ===
- Brant Kuithe, Utah (Coaches-1; Media-1)
- Joe Royer, Cincinnati (Coaches-1; Media-2)
- Jalin Conyers, Texas Tech (Coaches-2)
- Garrett Oakley, Kansas State (Coaches-2)
- Chamon Metayer, Arizona State (Coaches-2)
- Michael Trigg, Baylor (Coaches-2)

=== Receivers ===
- Tetairoa McMillan, Arizona (Coaches-1; Media-1)
- Travis Hunter, Colorado (Coaches-1; Media-1)
- Jordyn Tyson, Arizona State (Coaches-1; Media-2)
- Jayden Higgins, Iowa State (Coaches-2; Media-2)
- Jack Bech, TCU (Coaches-2)
- Josh Kelly, Texas Tech (Coaches-2)

== Defensive selections ==
=== Defensive linemen ===
- Dontay Corleone, Cincinnati (Coaches-1; Media-1)
- BJ Green II, Colorado (Coaches-1; Media-1)
- Brendan Mott, Kansas State (Coaches-1; Media-1)
- TJ Jackson II, West Virginia (Coaches-1; Media-1)
- Tyler Batty, BYU (Coaches-1; Media-2)
- C.J. Fite, Arizona State (Coaches-2; Media-2)
- Lee Hunter, UCF (Coaches-2; Media-2)
- Van Fillinger, Utah (Coaches-2; Media-2)
- Keith Cooper Jr., Houston (Coaches-2)
- Dean Miller, Kansas (Coaches-2)

=== Linebackers ===
- Matt Jones, Baylor (Coaches-1; Media-1)
- Keaton Thomas, Baylor (Coaches-1; Media-1)
- Jacob Rodriguez, Texas Tech (Coaches-1; Media-1)
- Nikhai Hill-Green, Colorado (Coaches-2; Media-2)
- Austin Romaine, Kansas State (Coaches-2; Media-2)
- Jared Bartlett, Cincinnati (Coaches-2)
- Keyshaun Elliott, Arizona State (Coaches-2)

=== Defensive backs ===
- Xavion Alford, Arizona State (Coaches-1; Media-1)
- Travis Hunter, Colorado (Coaches-1; Media-1)
- A.J. Haulcy, Houston (Coaches-1; Media-1)
- Mello Dotson, Kansas (Coaches-1; Media-1)
- Cobee Bryant, Kansas (Coaches-1; Media-2)
- Bud Clark, TCU (Coaches-2; Media-2)
- Jontez Williams, Iowa State (Coaches-2; Media-2)
- Tacario Davis, Arizona (Coaches-2)
- Jakob Robinson, BYU (Coaches-2)
- Cam’ron Silmon-Craig, Colorado (Media-2)
- Malik Verdon, Iowa State (Coaches-2)

== Special teams ==
=== Kickers ===
- Will Ferrin, BYU (Coaches-1; Media-1)
- Gino Garcia, Texas Tech (Coaches-2; Media-2)

=== Punters ===
- Palmer Williams, Baylor (Coaches-1; Media-1)
- Jack Bouwmeester, Utah (Coaches-2; Media-2)

=== All-purpose / Return specialists ===
- Jaylin Noel, Iowa State (Coaches-1; Media-1)
- Keelan Marion, BYU (Coaches-2; Media-2)
- Josh Cameron, Baylor (Coaches-1)

== Key ==
Bold = selected as a first-team player by both the coaches and media panel

Coaches = selected by Big 12 Conference coaches

Media = selected by a media panel

== See also ==
- 2024 College Football All-America Team
