= 2024 Big 12 Conference football season =

American college football season

- League: NCAA Division I FBS football season
- Sport: football
- Duration: August 29, 2024; January 2025
- Teams: 16
- Total attendance: 4,879,995
- TV partner(s): Fox Sports (Fox, FS1, FS2); ESPN (ABC, ESPN, ESPN2, ESPN+, ESPNU, SECN, Big 12 Now)

2025 NFL draft
- Top draft pick: Travis Hunter, CB/WR, Colorado
- Picked by: Jacksonville Jaguars, 2nd overall

Championship Game
- Date: December 7, 2024
- Venue: AT&T Stadium, Arlington, Texas
- Champions: Arizona State
- Runners-up: Iowa State
- Finals MVP: Cam Skattebo, RB, Arizona State

Seasons
- 2023 2025

2024 Big 12 Conference football standings
	Conf.			Overall
Team	W		L	W		L
No. 7 Arizona State y$^	7	–	2	11	–	3
No. 15 Iowa State y	7	–	2	11	–	3
No. 13 BYU	7	–	2	11	–	2
No. 25 Colorado	7	–	2	9	–	4
Baylor	6	–	3	8	–	5
TCU	6	–	3	9	–	4
Texas Tech	6	–	3	8	–	5
Kansas State	5	–	4	9	–	4
West Virginia	5	–	4	6	–	7
Kansas	4	–	5	5	–	7
Cincinnati	3	–	6	5	–	7
Houston	3	–	6	4	–	8
Utah	2	–	7	5	–	7
UCF	2	–	7	4	–	8
Arizona	2	–	7	4	–	8
Oklahoma State	0	–	9	3	–	9
Championship: Arizona State 45, Iowa State 19
^ – College Football Playoff participant; $ – Conference champion; y – Championship game participant; Rankings from AP Poll

The 2024 Big 12 Conference football season was the 29th season of the Big 12 Conference football, part of the 2024 NCAA Division I FBS football season.

The 2024 season was the first season for the Big 12 to have 16 members, following the departure of Oklahoma and Texas, the return of Colorado after a 13-season absence, and the addition of Arizona, Arizona State, and Utah.

The 2024 Big 12 Championship Game was played at AT&T Stadium in Arlington, Texas, on December 7, 2024. Arizona State defeated Iowa State 45–19 to clinch the automatic berth into the 2024–25 College Football Playoff.

== Preseason ==
=== Recruiting classes ===
National rankings
Team	ESPN	Rivals	24/7	On3 recruits	Total signees
Arizona	NR	64	49	95	16
Arizona State	54	46	51	46	19
Baylor	72	67	69	59	15
BYU	49	42	51	49	27
Cincinnati	39	52	52	53	21
Colorado	48	84	105	64	10
Houston	59	77	71	61	16
Iowa State	62	52	55	58	22
Kansas	46	48	45	41	17
Kansas State	57	61	59	42	16
Oklahoma State	61	52	56	52	18
TCU	33	38	31	36	21
Texas Tech	24	25	22	23	21
UCF	28	34	34	33	18
Utah	50	58	64	47	16
West Virginia	47	43	46	50	22

=== Big 12 media days ===
The 2024 Big 12 media days are currently be held at Allegiant Stadium on July 9–10, 2024 in Las Vegas, Nevada. The teams and representatives in respective order were as follows:

Tuesday July 9

- Big 12 Commissioner – Brett Yormark
- Arizona State – Kenny Dillingham (HC), Xavion Alford (DB), Leif Fautanu (OL), Cameron Skattebo (RB) & Clayton Smith (DL)
- Cincinnati – Scott Satterfield (HC), Derrick Canteen (DB), Mason Fletcher (P), Corey Kiner (RB) & Luke Kandra (OL)
- Iowa State – Matt Campbell (HC), Beau Freyler (DB), Jayden Higgins (WR), Jaylin Noel (WR) & J.R. Singleton (DL)
- Kansas State – Chris Klieman (HC), Avery Johnson (QB), Hadley Panzer (OL), Austin Moore (LB), Brendan Mott (DE) & Marques Sigle (DB)
- Oklahoma State – Mike Gundy (HC), Alan Bowman (QB), Ollie Gordon II (RB), Nick Martin (LB) & Collin Oliver (LB)
- TCU – Sonny Dykes (HC), Jack Bech (WR), Caleb Fox (DL), Josh Hoover (QB), Mike Nichols (OL) & Namdi Obiazor (LB)
- Texas Tech – Joey McGuire (HC), Tahj Brooks (RB), Behren Morton (QB), Bryce Ramirez (LB), Jacob Rodriguez (LB) & Caleb Rogers (OL)
- Utah – Kyle Whittingham (HC), Brant Kuithe (TE), Karene Reid (LB), Cameron Rising (QB) & Junior Fafuna (DT)

Wednesday July 10

- Big 12 Commissioner – Brett Yormark
- Arizona – Brent Brennan (HC), Noah Fifita (QB), Gunner Maldonado (DB), Jacob Manu (LB) & Tetairoa McMillan (WR)
- Baylor – Dave Aranda (HC), Ketron Jackson (WR), Matt Jones (LB), Richard Reese (RB), Keaton Thomas (LB) & Carl Williams IV (DB)
- BYU – Kalani Sitake (HC), Tyler Batty (DE), Connor Pay (OL), Jakob Robinson (DB), Darius Lassiter (WR) & Chase Roberts (WR)
- UCF – Gus Malzahn (HC), KJ Jefferson (QB), RJ Harvey (RB), Kobe Hudson (WR), Lee Hunter (DT) & Deshawn Pace (LB)
- Colorado – Deion Sanders (HC), Shedeur Sanders (QB), Shilo Sanders (DB), Travis Hunter (ATH) & Mark Vassett (P)
- Houston – Willie Fritz (HC), Tank Jenkins (OL), Latrell McCutchin Sr. (DB), Jamal Morris (LB) & Donovan Smith (QB)
- Kansas – Lance Leipold (HC), Jalon Daniels (QB), Mello Dotson (DB), Devin Neal (RB) & Jereme Robinson (DE)
- West Virginia – Neal Brown (HC), Aubrey Burks (DB), Garrett Greene (QB), Sean Martin (DL) & Wyatt Milum (OL)

=== Preseason poll ===
The preseason poll was released on July 2, 2024.

Big 12
Predicted finish	Team	Votes (1st place)
1	Utah	906 (20)
2	Kansas State	889 (19)
3	Oklahoma State	829 (14)
4	Kansas	772 (5)
5	Arizona	762 (3)
6	Iowa State	661
7	West Virginia	581
8	UCF	551
9	Texas Tech	532
10	TCU	436
11	Colorado	400
12	Baylor	268
13	BYU	215
14	Cincinnati	196
15	Houston	157
16	Arizona State	141

- First place votes in ()

=== Preseason awards ===
==== All−American Teams ====
	AP 1st Team	AP 2nd Team'	AS 1st Team'	AS 2nd Team	AS 3rd Team	AS 4th Team	WCFF 1st Team	WCFF 2nd Team	ESPN	CBS 1st Team	CBS 2nd Team	CFN 1st Team	CFN 2nd Team	PFF 1st Team	PFF 2nd Team	SN 1st Team	SN 2nd Team	USAT 1st Team	USAT 2nd Team	SI 1st Team	SI 2nd Team
Tahj Brooks								✓									✓				
Cobee Bryant					✓																
Jeremiah Cooper						✓															
Dontay Corleone						✓						✓									
Tacario Davis					✓								✓		✓	✓					
Ollie Gordon II	✓		✓				✓		✓	✓			✓	✓		✓					
Preston Hodge															✓						
Travis Hunter Jr.	✓			✓			✓		✓	✓		✓			✓	✓					
Luke Kandra				✓				✓													
Brant Kuithe				✓									✓						✓		
Jacob Manu						✓															
Nickolas Martin		✓		✓							✓								✓		
Tetairoa McMillan	✓		✓				✓		✓	✓		✓		✓		✓		✓		✓	
Joe Michalski						✓							✓								
Wyatt Milum				✓				✓							✓			✓			
Devin Neal						✓															
Collin Oliver				✓																	
Shedeur Sanders													✓								
Jonah Savaiinaea						✓							✓								
LaJohntay Wester											✓										

==== Individual awards ====
Award	Head Coach/Player	School	Position	Year	Ref
Lott Trophy	Cobee Bryant	Kansas	CB	Sr.	
Lott Trophy	Jeremiah Cooper	Iowa State	S	Jr.	
Lott Trophy	Dontay Corleone	Cincinnati	DL	Jr.	
Lott Trophy	Johnny Hodges	TCU	LB	Jr.	
Lott Trophy	Travis Hunter	Colorado	CB	Jr.	
Lott Trophy	Tacario Davis	Arizona	CB	Jr.	
Lott Trophy	Jacob Manu	Arizona	LB	Jr.	
Dodd Trophy	Lance Leipold	Kansas	Head coach	--	
Dodd Trophy	Chris Klieman	Kansas State	Head coach	--	
Dodd Trophy	Mike Gundy	Oklahoma State	Head coach	--	
Dodd Trophy	Kyle Whittingham	Utah	Head coach	--	
Maxwell Award	Noah Fifita	Arizona	QB	So.	
Maxwell Award	Tetairoa McMillan	Arizona	WR	Jr.	
Maxwell Award	Dequan Finn	Baylor	QB	Sr.	
Maxwell Award	Corey Kiner	Cincinnati	RB	Sr.	
Maxwell Award	Shedeur Sanders	Colorado	QB	Sr.	
Maxwell Award	Devin Neal	Kansas	RB	Sr.	
Maxwell Award	Jalon Daniels	Kansas	QB	Jr	
Maxwell Award	DJ Giddens	Kansas State	RB	Jr	
Maxwell Award	Avery Johnson	Kansas State	QB	So.	
Maxwell Award	Ollie Gordon II	Oklahoma State	RB	Jr.	
Maxwell Award	Tahj Brooks	Texas Tech	RB	Sr.	
Maxwell Award	KJ Jefferson	UCF	QB	Sr.	
Maxwell Award	RJ Harvey	UCF	RB	Sr.	
Maxwell Award	Cameron Rising	Utah	QB	Sr.	
Maxwell Award	Garrett Greene	West Virginia	QB	Sr.	
Patrick Mannelly Award	Luke Hosford	Kansas	LS	R-Sr.	
Patrick Mannelly Award	Brent Matiscik	TCU	LS	Sr.	
Patrick Mannelly Award	Austin Brinkman	West Virginia	LS	Sr.	
Outland Trophy	Dalton Cooper	Oklahoma State	OT	R-Sr.	
Outland Trophy	Joe Michalski	Oklahoma State	C	R-Sr.	
Outland Trophy	Dontay Corleone	Cincinnati	DL	Jr.	
Outland Trophy	Luke Kandra	Cincinnati	OG	R-Sr.	
Outland Trophy	B. J. Green	Colorado	DT	Sr.	
Outland Trophy	Lee Hunter	UCF	DT	Jr.	
Outland Trophy	Jonah Savaiinaea	Arizona	OT	Jr.	
Outland Trophy	Junior Tafuna	Utah	DT	Sr.	
Bronko Nagurski Trophy	Tyler Batty	BYU	DE	Jr.	
Bronko Nagurski Trophy	Cobee Bryant	Kansas	CB	Sr.	
Bronko Nagurski Trophy	Jeremiah Cooper	Iowa State	S	Jr.	
Bronko Nagurski Trophy	Beau Freyler	Iowa State	S	Sr.	
Bronko Nagurski Trophy	Dontay Corleone	Cincinnati	DL	Jr.	
Bronko Nagurski Trophy	Tacario Davis	Arizona	CB	Jr.	
Bronko Nagurski Trophy	Jacob Manu	Arizona	LB	Jr.	
Bronko Nagurski Trophy	Lee Hunter	UCF	DT	Jr.	
Bronko Nagurski Trophy	Travis Hunter	Colorado	CB	Jr.	
Bronko Nagurski Trophy	Nick Martin	Oklahoma State	LB	R-Jr.	
Bronko Nagurski Trophy	Collin Oliver	Oklahoma State	LB	Sr	
Bronko Nagurski Trophy	Junior Tafuna	Utah	DT	Sr	
Jim Thorpe Award	Cobee Bryant	Kansas	DB	Sr.	
Jim Thorpe Award	Jeremiah Cooper	Iowa State	DB	Jr.	
Jim Thorpe Award	Tacario Davis	Arizona	DB	Jr.	
Jim Thorpe Award	Travis Hunter	Colorado	DB	Jr.	
Paul Hornung Award	Cameron Skattebo	Arizona State	RB	Sr.	
Paul Hornung Award	Richard Reese	Baylor	RB	Jr.	
Paul Hornung Award	Parker Kingston	BYU	WR	So.	
Paul Hornung Award	Travis Hunter	Colorado	WR	So.	
Paul Hornung Award	Jaylin Noel	Iowa State	WR	Sr.	
Paul Hornung Award	Dylan Edwards	Kansas State	RB	So.	
Paul Hornung Award	Major Everhart	TCU	WR	So.	
Paul Hornung Award	Drae McCray	Texas Tech	WR	Sr.	
Paul Hornung Award	Brennan Presley	Oklahoma State	WR	Sr.	
Paul Hornung Award	Xavier Townsend	UCF	WR	Jr.	
Paul Hornung Award	Preston Fox	West Virginia	WR	Jr.	
Wuerffel Trophy	Noah Fifita	Arizona	QB	So.	
Wuerffel Trophy	Leif Fautanu	Arizona State	C	Sr.	
Wuerffel Trophy	Kyler Jordan	Baylor	OLB	Jr.	
Wuerffel Trophy	Connor Pay	BYU	C	Sr.	
Wuerffel Trophy	Shane Cokes	Colorado	DL	GS	
Wuerffel Trophy	Beau Freyler	Iowa State	DB	Sr.	
Wuerffel Trophy	Jared Casey	Kansas	TE	Sr.	
Wuerffel Trophy	Austin Moore	Kansas State	LB	Sr.	
Wuerffel Trophy	Alan Bowman	Oklahoma State	QB	GS	
Wuerffel Trophy	Tahj Brooks	Texas Tech	RB	Sr.	
Wuerffel Trophy	NaNa Osafo-Mensah	TCU	DL	Sr.	
Wuerffel Trophy	William Wells	UCF	DB	Sr.	
Wuerffel Trophy	Tao Johnson	Utah	S	So.	
Wuerffel Trophy	Garrett Greene	West Virginia	QB	Sr.	
Lou Groza Award	Tyler Loop	Arizona	PK	Jr.	
Ray Guy Award	Mason Fletcher	Cincinnati	P	Sr.	
Ray Guy Award	Mark Vassett	Colorado	P	Sr.	
Ray Guy Award	Tyler Perkins	Iowa State	P	Jr.	
Ray Guy Award	Jack Bouwmeester	Utah	P	Jr.	
Ray Guy Award	Oliver Straw	West Virginia	P	Jr.	
Walter Camp Award	Noah Fifita	Arizona	QB	So.	
Walter Camp Award	Tetairoa McMillan	Arizona	WR	Jr.	
Walter Camp Award	Shedeur Sanders	Colorado	QB	Sr.	
Walter Camp Award	Travis Hunter	Colorado	WR/DB	Jr.	
Walter Camp Award	Jalon Daniels	Kansas	QB	Jr.	
Walter Camp Award	Ollie Gordon II	Oklahoma State	RB	Jr.	
Walter Camp Award	Tahj Brooks	Texas Tech	RB	Sr.	
Walter Camp Award	Cameron Rising	Utah	QB	Sr.	
Walter Camp Award	Garrett Greene	West Virginia	QB	Sr.	
Doak Walker Award	Jacory Croskey-Merritt	Arizona	RB	Sr.	
Doak Walker Award	LJ Martin	BYU	RB	So.	
Doak Walker Award	Devin Neal	Kansas	RB	Sr.	
Doak Walker Award	Daniel Hishaw Jr.	Kansas	RB	Jr.	
Doak Walker Award	DJ Giddens	Kansas State	RB	Jr.	
Doak Walker Award	Ollie Gordon II	Oklahoma State	RB	Jr.	
Doak Walker Award	Tahj Brooks	Texas Tech	RB	Sr.	
Doak Walker Award	RJ Harvey	UCF	RB	Sr.	
Doak Walker Award	Jahiem White	West Virginia	RB	So.	
Biletnikoff Award	Tetairoa McMillan	Arizona	WR	Jr.	
Biletnikoff Award	Ashtyn Hawkins	Baylor	WR	Gr.	
Biletnikoff Award	Travis Hunter	Colorado	WR	Jr.	
Biletnikoff Award	LaJohntay Wester	Colorado	WR	Jr.	
Biletnikoff Award	Jayden Higgins	Iowa State	WR	Sr.	
Biletnikoff Award	Jaylin Noel	Iowa State	WR	Sr.	
Biletnikoff Award	Lawrence Arnold	Kansas	WR	Sr.	
Biletnikoff Award	Rashod Owens	Oklahoma State	WR	R-Sr.	
Biletnikoff Award	Brennan Presley	Oklahoma State	WR	Sr.	
Biletnikoff Award	Eric McAlister	TCU	WR	Jr.	
Biletnikoff Award	Josh Kelly	Texas Tech	WR	Gr.	
Biletnikoff Award	Kobe Hudson	UCF	WR	Sr.	

Award	Head Coach/Player	School	Position	Year	Ref
Davey O'Brien Award	Noah Fifita	Arizona	QB	So.	
Davey O'Brien Award	Dequan Finn	Baylor	QB	Sr.	
Davey O'Brien Award	Shedeur Sanders	Colorado	QB	Sr.	
Davey O'Brien Award	Rocco Becht	Iowa State	QB	So.	
Davey O'Brien Award	Jalon Daniels	Kansas	QB	Jr.	
Davey O'Brien Award	KJ Jefferson	UCF	QB	Sr.	
Davey O'Brien Award	Cameron Rising	Utah	QB	Sr.	
Davey O'Brien Award	Garrett Greene	West Virginia	QB	Sr.	
John Mackey Award	Markeston Douglas	Arizona State	TE	R-Jr.	
John Mackey Award	Benjamin Brahmer	Iowa State	TE	So.	
John Mackey Award	Drake Dabney	TCU	TE	Sr.	
John Mackey Award	Jalin Conyers	Texas Tech	TE	Sr.	
John Mackey Award	Brant Kuithe	Utah	TE	Sr.	
John Mackey Award	Kole Taylor	West Virginia	TE	Sr.	
Rimington Trophy	Leif Fautanu	Arizona State	C	R-Jr.	
Rimington Trophy	Connor Pay	BYU	C	Sr.	
Rimington Trophy	Gavin Gerhardt	Cincinnati	C	R-Sr.	
Rimington Trophy	Joe Michalski	Oklahoma State	C	R-Sr.	
Bednarik Award	Tacario Davis	Arizona	CB	Jr.	
Bednarik Award	Tyler Batty	BYU	DE	Jr.	
Bednarik Award	Dontay Corleone	Cincinnati	DL	Jr.	
Bednarik Award	Travis Hunter	Colorado	CB	Jr.	
Bednarik Award	B. J. Green	Colorado	DT	Sr.	
Bednarik Award	Jeremiah Cooper	Iowa State	S	Jr.	
Bednarik Award	Cobee Bryant	Kansas	CB	Sr.	
Bednarik Award	Austin Moore	Kansas State	LB	Sr.	
Bednarik Award	Nick Martin	Oklahoma State	LB	R-Jr.	
Bednarik Award	Collin Oliver	Oklahoma State	LB	Sr.	
Bednarik Award	Namdi Obiazor	TCU	LB	Sr.	
Bednarik Award	Lee Hunter	UCF	DT	Jr.	
Bednarik Award	Junior Tafuna	Utah	DT	Sr.	
Butkus Award	Jacob Manu	Arizona	LB	Jr.	
Butkus Award	Jack Kelly	BYU	LB	R-Jr.	
Butkus Award	Nick Martin	Oklahoma State	LB	R-Jr.	
Butkus Award	Collin Oliver	Oklahoma State	LB	Sr.	
Butkus Award	Namdi Obiazor	TCU	LB	Sr.	
Butkus Award	Lander Barton	Utah	LB	Jr.	
Butkus Award	Karene Reid	Utah	LB	Sr.	
Manning Award	Noah Fifita	Arizona	QB	So.	
Manning Award	Shedeur Sanders	Colorado	QB	Sr.	
Manning Award	Donovan Smith	Houston	QB	Sr.	
Manning Award	Rocco Becht	Iowa State	QB	So.	
Manning Award	Alan Bowman	Oklahoma State	QB	Sr.	
Manning Award	Garrett Greene	West Virginia	QB	Sr.	
Johnny Unitas Golden Arm Award	Noah Fifita	Arizona	QB	So.	
Johnny Unitas Golden Arm Award	Dequan Finn	Baylor	QB	Sr.	
Johnny Unitas Golden Arm Award	Brendan Sorsby	Cincinnati	QB	R-So.	
Johnny Unitas Golden Arm Award	Shedeur Sanders	Colorado	QB	Sr.	
Johnny Unitas Golden Arm Award	Rocco Becht	Iowa State	QB	Sr.	
Johnny Unitas Golden Arm Award	Donovan Smith	Houston	QB	Sr.	
Johnny Unitas Golden Arm Award	Jalon Daniels	Kansas	QB	Sr.	
Johnny Unitas Golden Arm Award	Alan Bowman	Oklahoma State	QB	Sr.	
Johnny Unitas Golden Arm Award	Behren Morton	Texas Tech	QB	Jr.	
Johnny Unitas Golden Arm Award	KJ Jefferson	UCF	QB	Sr.	
Johnny Unitas Golden Arm Award	Garrett Greene	West Virginia	QB	Sr.	
Johnny Unitas Golden Arm Award	Cameron Rising	Utah	QB	Sr.	
Polynesian College Football Player Of The Year Award	Noah Fifita	Arizona	QB	So.	
Polynesian College Football Player Of The Year Award	Keanu Mailoto	Arizona	DL	R-Jr.	
Polynesian College Football Player Of The Year Award	Jacob Manu	Arizona	LB	Jr.	
Polynesian College Football Player Of The Year Award	Tetairoa McMillan	Arizona	WR	Jr.	
Polynesian College Football Player Of The Year Award	Jonah Savaiinaea	Arizona	OL	Jr.	
Polynesian College Football Player Of The Year Award	Stanley Ta'ufo'ou	Arizona	OL	R-Sr.	
Polynesian College Football Player Of The Year Award	Ta'ita'i Uiagalelei	Arizona	DL	Jr.	
Polynesian College Football Player Of The Year Award	Leif Fautanu	Arizona State	OL		
Polynesian College Football Player Of The Year Award	Sean Na'a	Arizona State	OL	R-Jr.	
Polynesian College Football Player Of The Year Award	Tonga Lolohea	Baylor	DL	R-Jr.	
Polynesian College Football Player Of The Year Award	Raider Damuni	BYU	S	So.	
Polynesian College Football Player Of The Year Award	Keanu Hill	BYU	TE	R-Sr.	
Polynesian College Football Player Of The Year Award	Weylin Lapuaho	BYU	OL	Jr.	
Polynesian College Football Player Of The Year Award	Austin Leausa	BYU	OL	Jr.	
Polynesian College Football Player Of The Year Award	Uso Seumalo	Kansas State	DL	Sr.	
Polynesian College Football Player Of The Year Award	Logan Fano	Utah	DL	So.	
Polynesian College Football Player Of The Year Award	Spencer Fano	Utah	OL	So.	
Polynesian College Football Player Of The Year Award	Alaka'i Gilman	Utah	S	Sr.	
Polynesian College Football Player Of The Year Award	Michael Mokofisi	Utah	OL	Jr.	
Polynesian College Football Player Of The Year Award	Simote Pepa	Utah	DL	Jr.	
Polynesian College Football Player Of The Year Award	Junior Tafuna	Utah	DL	Sr.	
Polynesian College Football Player Of The Year Award	Keanu Tanuvasa	Utah	DL	So.	
Polynesian College Football Player Of The Year Award	Tanoa Togiai	Utah	OL	Jr.	
Rotary Lombardi Award	Jacob Manu	Arizona	LB	Jr.	
Rotary Lombardi Award	Jonah Savaiinaea	Arizona	OL	Jr.	
Rotary Lombardi Award	Tyler Batty	BYU	DE	Jr.	
Rotary Lombardi Award	Lee Hunter	UCF	LB	R-Jr.	
Rotary Lombardi Award	Dontay Corleone	Cincinnati	DL	Jr.	
Rotary Lombardi Award	Luke Kandra	Cincinnati	OG	R-Sr.	
Rotary Lombardi Award	B. J. Green	Colorado	DT	Sr.	
Rotary Lombardi Award	Jeremiah Cooper	Iowa State	S	Jr.	
Rotary Lombardi Award	Dalton Cooper	Oklahoma State	OT	R-Sr.	
Rotary Lombardi Award	Joe Michalski	Oklahoma State	C	R-Sr.	
Rotary Lombardi Award	Nick Martin	Oklahoma State	LB	R-Jr.	
Rotary Lombardi Award	Collin Oliver	Oklahoma State	LB	Sr	
Rotary Lombardi Award	Junior Tafuna	Utah	DT	Sr	
Rotary Lombardi Award	Wyatt Milum	West Virginia	OT	Sr	
Earl Campbell Tyler Rose Award	Alton McCaskill	Arizona State	RB	R-So.	
Earl Campbell Tyler Rose Award	Jordyn Tyson	Arizona State	WR	R-So.	
Earl Campbell Tyler Rose Award	Dequan Finn	Baylor	QB	Sr.	
Earl Campbell Tyler Rose Award	L.J. Martin	BYU	RB	So.	
Earl Campbell Tyler Rose Award	Kaden Kitler	UCF	C	R-So.	
Earl Campbell Tyler Rose Award	Shedeur Sanders	Colorado	QB	Sr.	
Earl Campbell Tyler Rose Award	Donovan Smith	Houston	QB	R-Sr.	
Earl Campbell Tyler Rose Award	Lawrence Arnold	Kansas	WR	R-Jr.	
Earl Campbell Tyler Rose Award	Ollie Gordon II	Oklahoma State	RB	Jr.	
Earl Campbell Tyler Rose Award	Drake Dabney	TCU	TE	R-Sr.	
Earl Campbell Tyler Rose Award	Josh Hoover	TCU	QB	R-Fr.	
Earl Campbell Tyler Rose Award	Savion Williams	TCU	WR	Sr.	
Earl Campbell Tyler Rose Award	Tahj Brooks	Texas Tech	RB	Sr.	
Earl Campbell Tyler Rose Award	Josh Kelly	Texas Tech	WR	Gr.	
Earl Campbell Tyler Rose Award	Behren Morton	Texas Tech	QB	R-So.	
Earl Campbell Tyler Rose Award	Brant Kuithe	Utah	TE	Sr.	

==== Preseason All-Big 12 teams ====
2024 Preseason All-Big 12

- Offensive Player of the Year: Ollie Gordon II, RB, Oklahoma State, Jr.
- Defensive Player of the Year: Travis Hunter, DB, Colorado, Jr.
- Newcomer of the Year: KJ Jefferson, QB, UCF, Sr.

All-Big 12 Offense
Position	Player	Class	Team
QB	Shedeur Sanders	Sr.	Colorado
RB	Ollie Gordon II	Jr.	Oklahoma State
RB	Tahj Brooks	Sr.	Texas Tech
FB	Stevo Klotz	Sr.	Iowa State
WR	Tetairoa McMillan	Jr.	Arizona
WR	Kobe Hudson	Sr.	UCF
WR	Jayden Higgins	Sr.	Iowa State
WR	Brennan Presley	Sr.	Oklahoma State
TE	Brant Kuithe	Sr.	Utah
OL	Jonah Savaiinaea	Jr.	Arizona
OL	Luke Kandra	Sr.	Cincinnati
OL	Dalton Cooper	Sr.	Oklahoma State
OL	Joe Michalski	Sr.	Oklahoma State
OL	Wyatt Milum	Sr.	West Virginia
PK	Tyler Loop	Sr.	Arizona
KR/PR	Drae McCray	Sr.	Texas Tech

All-Big 12 Defense
Position	Player	Class	Team
DL	Tyler Batty	Sr.	BYU
DL	Dontay Corleone	Jr.	Cincinnati
DL	B.J. Green	Sr.	Colorado
DL	Lee Hunter	Jr.	UCF
DL	Junior Tafuna	Sr.	Utah
LB	Jacob Manu	Jr.	Arizona
LB	Nickolas Martin	Jr.	Oklahoma State
LB	Collin Oliver	Sr.	Oklahoma State
DB	Tacario Davis	Jr.	Arizona
DB	Travis Hunter	Jr.	Colorado
DB	Jeremiah Cooper	Jr.	Iowa State
DB	Cobee Bryant	Sr.	Kansas
DB	Mello Dotson	Sr.	Kansas
P	Jack Bouwmeester	Jr.	Utah

== Head coaches ==
=== Coaching changes ===
There were two coaching changes before the 2024 season. On December 3, 2023, Houston hired Tulane head coach Willie Fritz as the 16th head coach in Cougars history. Then, on January 14, 2024, Arizona head coach Jedd Fisch was announced as the new head coach at Washington, following Kalen DeBoer's departure to replace the retiring Nick Saban at Alabama. Two days later, Arizona announced Brent Brennan, previously head coach at San Jose State, as the 31st head coach in school history.

=== Coaches ===
Note: All stats current through the completion of the 2023 season

Team	Head coach	Year at school	Overall record	Record at school	Big 12 record	Conference Championships
Arizona	Brent Brennan	1	34–48	0–0	0–0	0
Arizona State	Kenny Dillingham	2	3–9	3–9	0–0	0
Baylor	Dave Aranda	5	23–25	23–25	15–21	1
BYU	Kalani Sitake	9	61–41	61–41	2–7	0
Cincinnati	Scott Satterfield	2	79–57	3–9	1–8	0
Colorado	Deion Sanders	2	31–14	4–8	0–0	0
Houston	Willie Fritz	1	208–116	0–0	0–0	0
Iowa State	Matt Campbell	9	88–63	53–48	38–34	0
Kansas	Lance Leipold	4	163–60	17–21	9–18	0
Kansas State	Chris Klieman	6	111–37	39–24	26–19	1
Oklahoma State	Mike Gundy	20	166–79	166–79	102–63	1
TCU	Sonny Dykes	3	89–72	18–9	12–6	0
Texas Tech	Joey McGuire	3	15–11	15–11	10–8	0
UCF	Gus Malzahn	4	101–54	24–16	3–6	0
Utah	Kyle Whittingham	21	162–79	162–79	0–0	0
West Virginia	Neal Brown†	6	66–45	31–29	20–24	0

Notes: † Neal Brown was fired after 6 seasons on December 1, 2024. He finished his career at West Virginia with a 37–35 record and 4 bowl appearances. Chad Scott was named interim coached for the Frisco Bowl against the Memphis Tigers. Scott will be replaced by former West Virginia coach Rich Rodriguez.

== Schedule ==
Index to colors and formatting
Big 12 member won
Big 12 member lost
Big 12 teams in **bold**

All times Central time.

† denotes Homecoming game

Rankings reflect those of the AP poll for weeks 1 through 9. Rankings from Week 10 until the end of the Season reflect those of the College Football Playoff Rankings.

=== Regular season ===
==== Week One ====
Date	Time	Visiting team	Home team	Site	TV	Result	Attendance	Ref.
August 29	6:00 p.m.	New Hampshire	**UCF**	FBC Mortgage Stadium • Orlando, FL	ESPN+	**W** 57–3	44,206	
August 29	7:00 p.m.	No. 2 (FCS) North Dakota State	**Colorado**	Folsom Field • Boulder, CO	ESPN	**W** 31–26	49,438	
August 29	7:00 p.m.	Lindenwood	No. 22 **Kansas**	Children's Mercy Park • Kansas City, KS	ESPN+	**W** 48–3	20,829	
August 29	8:00 p.m.	Southern Utah	No. 12 **Utah**	Rice–Eccles Stadium • Salt Lake City, UT	ESPN+	**W** 49–0	52,210	
August 30	9:30 p.m.	**TCU**	Stanford	Stanford Stadium • Stanford, CA	ESPN	**W** 34–27	36,026	
August 31	11:00 a.m.	No. 8 Penn State	**West Virginia**	Milan Puskar Stadium • Morgantown, WV (rivalry)	FOX	**L** 12–34	62,084	
August 31	1:00 p.m.	No. 1 (FCS) South Dakota State	No. 17 **Oklahoma State**	Boone Pickens Stadium • Stillwater, OK	ESPN+	**W** 44–20	52,202	
August 31	1:30 p.m.	Towson	**Cincinnati**	Nippert Stadium • Cincinnati, OH	ESPN+	**W** 38–20	37,654	
August 31	2:30 p.m.	No. 24 (FCS) North Dakota	**Iowa State**	Jack Trice Stadium • Ames, IA	FS1	**W** 21–3	56,148	
August 31	6:00 p.m.	No. 21 (FCS) Tarleton State	**Baylor**	McLane Stadium • Waco, TX	ESPN+	**W** 45–3	42,272	
August 31	6:00 p.m.	UNLV	**Houston**	TDECU Stadium • Houston, TX	FS1	**L** 7–27	25,750	
August 31	6:00 p.m.	UT Martin	No. 18 **Kansas State**	Bill Snyder Family Football Stadium • Manhattan, KS	ESPN+	**W** 41–6	51,240	
August 31	6:30 p.m.	Abilene Christian	**Texas Tech**	Jones AT&T Stadium • Lubbock, TX	ESPN+	**W** 52–51 ^{OT}	60,229	
August 31	7:00 p.m.	No. 10 (FCS) Southern Illinois	**BYU**	LaVell Edwards Stadium • Provo, UT	ESPN+	**W** 41–13	63,712	
August 31	9:30 p.m.	New Mexico	No. 21 **Arizona**	Arizona Stadium • Tucson, AZ (rivalry)	ESPN	**W** 61–39	44,748	
August 31	9:30 p.m.	Wyoming	**Arizona State**	Mountain America Stadium • Tempe, AZ	FS1	**W** 48–7	48,108	
^{#}Rankings from AP Poll released prior to game. All times are in Central Time.

==== Week Two ====
Date	Time	Visiting team	Home team	Site	TV	Result	Attendance	Ref.
September 6	6:00 p.m.	**BYU**	SMU	Gerald J. Ford Stadium • Dallas, TX	ESPN2	**W** 18–15	31,172	
September 7	11:00 a.m.	Arkansas	No. 16 **Oklahoma State**	Boone Pickens Stadium • Stillwater, OK	ABC	**W** 39–31 ^{2OT}	52,202	
September 7	11:00 a.m.	Pittsburgh	**Cincinnati**	Nippert Stadium • Cincinnati, OH	ESPN2	**L** 27–28	37,992	
September 7	11:00 a.m.	No. 17 **Kansas State**	Tulane	Yulman Stadium • New Orleans, LA	ESPN	**W** 34–27	25,034	
September 7	2:30 p.m.	**Baylor**‡	No. 11 **Utah**‡†	Rice-Eccles Stadium • Salt Lake City, UT	FOX	**UTAH** 23–12	52,827	
September 7	2:30 p.m.	**Iowa State**	No. 21 Iowa	Kinnick Stadium • Iowa City, IA (Cy-Hawk Trophy)	CBS	**W** 20–19	69,250	
September 7	5:00 p.m.	No. 16 (FCS) Albany	**West Virginia**	Milan Puskar Stadium • Morgantown, WV	ESPN+	**W** 49–14	50,073	
September 7	5:30 p.m.	Sam Houston	**UCF**	FBC Mortgage Stadium • Orlando, FL	ESPN+	**W** 45–14	43,807	
September 7	6:00 p.m.	No. 19 **Kansas**	Illinois	Memorial Stadium • Champaign, IL	FS1	**L** 17–23	60,670	
September 7	6:30 p.m.	**Colorado**	Nebraska	Memorial Stadium • Lincoln, NE (rivalry)	NBC	**L** 10–28	86,906	
September 7	6:45 p.m.	**Houston**	No. 15 Oklahoma	Gaylord Family Oklahoma Memorial Stadium • Norman, OK	SECN	**L** 12–16	83,653	
September 7	7:00 p.m.	LIU	**TCU**	Amon G. Carter Stadium • Fort Worth, TX	ESPN+	**W** 45–0	44,063	
September 7	9:00 p.m.	**Texas Tech**	Washington State	Martin Stadium • Pullman, WA	FOX	**L** 16–37	27,372	
September 7	9:00 p.m.	Northern Arizona	No. 20 **Arizona**	Arizona Stadium • Tucson, AZ	ESPN+	**W** 22–10	47,746	
September 7	9:30 p.m.	Mississippi State	**Arizona State**	Mountain America Stadium • Tempe, AZ	ESPN	**W** 30–23	45,504	
^{#}Rankings from AP Poll released prior to game. All times are in Central Time.

Notes: ‡ game is being played as a non-conference game and will not count towards conference standings

==== Week Three ====
Date	Time	Visiting team	Home team	Site	TV	Result	Attendance	Ref.
September 12	6:30 p.m.	**Arizona State**	Texas State	Bobcat Stadium • San Marcos, TX	ESPN	**W** 31–28	25,187	
September 13	6:00 p.m.	UNLV	**Kansas**	Children's Mercy Park • Kansas City, KS	ESPN	**L** 20–23	21,493	
September 13	7:00 p.m.	No. 20 **Arizona**‡	No. 14 **Kansas State**‡	Bill Snyder Family Football Stadium • Manhattan, KS	FOX	**KSU** 31–7	51,290	
September 14	11:00 a.m.	No. 13 **Oklahoma State**	Tulsa	H.A. Chapman Stadium • Tulsa, OK	ESPN2	**W** 45–10	30,915	
September 14	11:00 a.m.	North Texas	**Texas Tech**	Jones AT&T Stadium • Lubbock, TX	FS1	**W** 66–21	57,865	
September 14	11:00 a.m.	**Cincinnati**	Miami (OH)	Yager Stadium • Oxford, OH (Victory Bell)	ESPNU	**W** 27–16	24,717	
September 14	2:30 p.m.	**West Virginia**	Pittsburgh	Acrisure Stadium • Pittsburgh, PA (Backyard Brawl)	ESPN2	**L** 34–38	66,087	
September 14	4:30 p.m.	No. 12 **Utah**	Utah State	Maverik Stadium • Logan, UT (Battle of the Brothers)	CBSSN	**W** 38–21	25,513	
September 14	6:30 p.m.	**UCF**	**TCU**	Amon G. Carter Stadium • Fort Worth, TX	FOX	**UCF** 35–34	48,889	
September 14	6:30 p.m.	Air Force	**Baylor**	McLane Stadium • Waco, TX	FS1	**W** 31–3	46,212	
September 14	6:30 p.m.	**Colorado**	Colorado State	Canvas Stadium • Fort Collins, CO (Rocky Mountain Showdown)	CBS	**W** 28–9	40,099	
September 14	7:00 p.m.	Rice	**Houston**	TDECU Stadium • Houston, TX (rivalry)	ESPN+	**W** 33–7	28,146	
September 14	9:00 p.m.	**BYU**	Wyoming	War Memorial Stadium • Laramie, WY	CBSSN	**W** 34–14	24,513	
^{#}Rankings from AP Poll released prior to game. All times are in Central Time.

Notes: ‡ game is being played as a non-conference game and will not count towards conference standings

Date	Bye Week
September 14	No. 21 **Iowa State**

==== Week Four ====
Date	Time	Visiting team	Home team	Site	TV	Result	Attendance	Ref.
September 21	11:00 a.m.	**Kansas**	**West Virginia**	Milan Puskar Stadium • Morgantown, WV	ESPN2	**WVU** 32–28	52,428	
September 21	11:00 a.m.	**Houston**	**Cincinnati**	Nippert Stadium • Cincinnati, OH	FS1	**CIN** 34–0	38,007	
September 21	1:00 p.m.	Arkansas State	No. 20 **Iowa State**	Jack Trice Stadium • Ames, IA	ESPN+	**W** 52–7	55,428	
September 21	2:30 p.m.	**Arizona State**	**Texas Tech**	Jones AT&T Stadium • Lubbock, TX	FS1	**TTU** 30–22	58,795	
September 21	3:00 p.m.	No. 12 **Utah**	No. 14 **Oklahoma State**	Boone Pickens Stadium • Stillwater, OK	FOX	**UTAH** 22–19	52,202	
September 21	4:00 p.m.	**TCU**	SMU	Gerald J. Ford Stadium • Dallas, TX (rivalry)	The CW	**L** 42–66	33,168	
September 21	7:00 p.m.	**Baylor**	**Colorado**†	Folsom Field • Boulder, CO	FOX	**COL** 38–31 ^{OT}	52,794	
September 21	9:30 p.m.	No. 13 **Kansas State**	**BYU**	LaVell Edwards Stadium • Provo, UT	ESPN	**BYU** 38–9	64,201	
^{#}Rankings from AP Poll released prior to game. All times are in Central Time.

Date	Bye Week	
September 21	**Arizona**	**UCF**

==== Week Five ====
Date	Time	Visiting team	Home team	Site	TV	Result	Attendance	Ref.
September 28	11:00 a.m.	No. 22 **BYU**	**Baylor**	McLane Stadium • Waco, TX	FS1	**BYU** 34–28	39,583	
September 28	11:00 a.m.	No. 20 **Oklahoma State**	No. 23 **Kansas State**	Bill Snyder Family Stadium • Manhattan, KS	ESPN	**KSU** 42–20	51,741	
September 28	2:30 p.m.	**Colorado**	**UCF**	FBC Mortgage Stadium • Orlando, FL (Big Noon Kickoff)	FOX	**COL** 48–21	45,702	
September 28	2:30 p.m.	**TCU**	**Kansas**	Arrowhead Stadium • Kansas City, MO	ESPN+	**TCU** 38–27	47,928	
September 28	6:00 p.m.	No. 18 **Iowa State**	**Houston**	TDECU Stadium • Houston, TX	FS1	**ISU** 20–0	25,138	
September 28	7:00 p.m.	**Cincinnati**	**Texas Tech**	Jones AT&T Stadium • Lubbock, TX	ESPN2	**TTU** 44–41	60,229	
September 28	9:15 p.m.	**Arizona**	No. 10 **Utah**	Rice–Eccles Stadium • Salt Lake City, UT	ESPN	**ARIZ** 23–10	52,898	
^{#}Rankings from AP Poll released prior to game. All times are in Central Time.

Date	Bye Week	
September 28	**Arizona State**	**West Virginia**

==== Week Six ====
Date	Time	Visiting team	Home team	Site	TV	Result	Attendance	Ref.
October 4	6:30 p.m.	Houston	**TCU**	Amon G. Carter Stadium • Fort Worth, TX	ESPN	**HOU** 30–19	44,211	
October 5	3:00 p.m.	West Virginia	**Oklahoma State**	Boone Pickens Stadium • Stillwater, OK	ESPN2	**WVU** 38–14	52,202	
October 5	6:30 p.m.	Baylor	No. 16 **Iowa State**	Jack Trice Stadium • Ames, IA	FOX	**ISU** 43–21	61,500	
October 5	6:45 p.m.	UCF	Florida	Ben Hill Griffin Stadium • Gainesville, FL	SECN	**L** 13–24	90,369	
October 5	7:00 p.m.	Kansas	**Arizona State**	Mountain America Stadium • Tempe, AZ	ESPN2	**ASU** 35–31	54,639	
October 5	10:00 p.m.	Texas Tech	**Arizona**	Arizona Stadium • Tucson, AZ	FOX	**TTU** 28–21	45,773	
^{#}Rankings from AP Poll released prior to game. All times are in Central Time.

Date	Bye Week				
October 5	**No. 17 BYU**	**Cincinnati**	**Colorado**	**No. 20 Kansas State**	**No. 18 Utah**

==== Week Seven ====
Date	Time	Visiting team	Home team	Site	TV	Result	Attendance	Ref.
October 11	9:30 p.m.	No. 16 **Utah**	**Arizona State**	Mountain America Stadium • Tempe, AZ	ESPN	**ASU** 27–19	45,310	
October 12	2:30 p.m.	**Cincinnati**	**UCF**	FBC Mortgage Stadium • Orlando, FL (rivalry)	ESPN2	**CIN** 19–13	42,611	
October 12	3:00 p.m.	**Arizona**	No. 14 **BYU**†	LaVell Edwards Stadium • Provo, UT (Big Noon Kickoff)	FOX	**BYU** 41–19	64,420	
October 12	7:00 p.m.	No. 11т **Iowa State**	**West Virginia**	Milan Puskar Stadium • Morgantown, WV	FOX	**ISU** 28–16	55,202	
October 12	9:15 p.m.	No. 18т **Kansas State**	**Colorado**	Folsom Field • Boulder, CO (rivalry)	ESPN	**KSU** 32–28	53,972	
^{#}Rankings from AP Poll released prior to game. All times are in Central Time.

Date	Bye Week					
October 12	**Baylor**	**Houston**	**Kansas**	**Oklahoma State**	**TCU**	**Texas Tech**

==== Week Eight ====
Date	Time	Visiting team	Home team	Site	TV	Result	Attendance	Ref.
October 18	9:15 p.m.	**Oklahoma State**	No. 13 **BYU**	LaVell Edwards Stadium • Provo, UT	ESPN	**BYU** 38–35	62,841	
October 19	11:00 a.m.	**Arizona State**	**Cincinnati**†	Nippert Stadium • Cincinnati, OH	ESPN+	**CIN** 24–14	38,007	
October 19	2:30 p.m.	**Houston**	**Kansas**†	Arrowhead Stadium • Kansas City, MO	ESPN+	**KU** 42–14	38,619	
October 19	3:00 p.m.	**Colorado**	**Arizona**†	Arizona Stadium • Tucson, AZ	FOX	**COL** 34–7	50,724	
October 19	3:00 p.m.	**Baylor**	**Texas Tech**†	Jones AT&T Stadium • Lubbock, TX (rivalry)	ESPN2	**BAY** 59–35	60,229	
October 19	6:30 p.m.	**UCF**	No. 9 **Iowa State**	Jack Trice Stadium • Ames, IA	FS1	**ISU** 38–35	61,500	
October 19	6:30 p.m.	No. 17 **Kansas State**	**West Virginia**†	Milan Puskar Stadium • Morgantown, WV	FOX	**KSU** 45–18	54,327	
October 19	9:30 p.m.	**TCU**	**Utah**	Rice–Eccles Stadium • Salt Lake City, UT	ESPN	**TCU** 13–7	53,299	
^{#}Rankings from AP Poll released prior to game. All times are in Central Time.

==== Week Nine ====
Date	Time	Visiting team	Home team	Site	TV	Result	Attendance	Ref.
October 26	2:30 p.m.	**Oklahoma State**	**Baylor**†	McLane Stadium • Waco, TX	ESPN+	**BAY** 38–28	44,987	
October 26	2:30 p.m.	No. 11 **BYU**	**UCF**†	FBC Mortgage Stadium • Orlando, FL	ESPN	**BYU** 37–24	42,144	
October 26	2:30 p.m.	**Texas Tech**	**TCU**†	Amon G. Carter Stadium • Fort Worth, TX (rivalry)	FOX	**TCU** 35–34	42,144	
October 26	6:00 p.m.	**West Virginia**	**Arizona**	Arizona Stadium • Tucson, AZ	FS1	**WVU** 31–26	49,888	
October 26	6:00 p.m.	**Utah**	**Houston**†	TDECU Stadium • Houston, TX	ESPN+	**HOU** 17–14	28,251	
October 26	7:00 p.m.	**Kansas**	No. 16 **Kansas State**†	Bill Snyder Family Football Stadium • Manhattan, KS (Sunflower Showdown)	ESPN2	**KSU** 29–27	52,074	
October 26	9:15 p.m.	**Cincinnati**	**Colorado**	Folsom Field • Boulder, CO	ESPN	**COL** 34–23	53,202	
^{#}Rankings from AP Poll released prior to game. All times are in Central Time.

Date	Bye Week	
October 26	**Arizona State**	**No. 10 Iowa State**

==== Week Ten ====
Date	Time	Visiting team	Home team	Site	TV	Result	Attendance	Ref.
November 2	2:30 p.m.	**Arizona**	**UCF**	FBC Mortgage Stadium • Orlando, FL	FS1	**UCF** 56–12	42,110	
November 2	2:30 p.m.	No. 17 **Kansas State**	**Houston**	TDECU Stadium • Houston, TX	FOX	**HOU** 24–19	23,085	
November 2	2:30 p.m.	**Arizona State**	**Oklahoma State**†	Boone Pickens Stadium • Stillwater, OK	FOX/FS2	**ASU** 42–21	52,202	
November 2	2:30 p.m.	**Texas Tech**	No. 11т **Iowa State**†	Jack Trice Stadium • Ames, IA	ESPN	**TTU** 23–22	61,500	
November 2	7:00 p.m.	**TCU**	**Baylor**	McLane Stadium • Waco, TX (rivalry)	ESPN2	**BAY** 37–34	44,171	
^{#}Rankings from College Football Playoff. All times are in Central Time.

Date	Bye Week					
November 2	**No. 9 BYU**	**Cincinnati**	**No. 23 Colorado**	**Kansas**	**Utah**	**West Virginia**

Notes: The Oklahoma State versus Arizona State game time was changed from 6:00 p.m. local to 2:30 p.m. local time due to inclement weather. The game aired on FOX in the Arizona and Oklahoma markets. The game also aired on FS2 and the Fox Sports app in all other markets. Kansas State versus Houston was scheduled for the same time and TV network, thus will remained on FOX in all markets outside Arizona and Oklahoma, plus was available on the Fox Sports App.

==== Week Eleven ====
Date	Time	Visiting team	Home team	Site	TV	Result	Attendance	Ref.
November 9	11:00 a.m.	**West Virginia**	Cincinnati	Nippert Stadium • Cincinnati, OH (rivalry)	FS1	**WVU** 31–24	38,007	
November 9	2:30 p.m.	No. 17 **Iowa State**	Kansas	Arrowhead Stadium • Kansas City, MO	FS1	**KU** 45–36	51,109	
November 9	3:00 p.m.	No. 20 **Colorado**	Texas Tech	Jones AT&T Stadium • Lubbock, TX (Big Noon Kickoff)	FOX	**COL** 41–27	60,229	
November 9	6:00 p.m.	**UCF**	Arizona State	Mountain America Stadium • Tempe, AZ	ESPN2	**ASU** 35–31	44,940	
November 9	6:00 p.m.	**Oklahoma State**	TCU	Amon G. Carter Stadium • Fort Worth, TX	FS1	**TCU** 38–13	45,348	
November 9	9:15 p.m.	No. 9 **BYU**	Utah	Rice–Eccles Stadium • Salt Lake City, UT (Holy War)	ESPN	**BYU** 22–21	54,383	
^{#}Rankings from College Football Playoff. All times are in Central Time.

Date	Bye Week			
November 9	**Arizona**	**Baylor**	**Houston**	**No. 19 Kansas State**

==== Week Twelve ====
Date	Time	Visiting team	Home team	Site	TV	Result	Attendance	Ref.
November 15	9:15 p.m.	Houston	**Arizona**	Arizona Stadium • Tucson, AZ	FS1	**ARIZ** 27–3	38,538	
November 16	11:00 a.m.	Utah	No. 17 **Colorado**	Folsom Field • Boulder, CO (Rumble in the Rockies/Big Noon Kickoff)	FOX	**COL** 49–24	54,646	
November 16	3:00 p.m.	Baylor	**West Virginia**	Milan Puskar Stadium • Morgantown, WV	ESPN2	**WVU** 49–35	52,376	
November 16	6:00 p.m.	Arizona State	No. 16 **Kansas State**	Bill Snyder Family Stadium • Manhattan, KS	ESPN	**ASU** 24–14	51,880	
November 16	7:00 p.m.	Cincinnati	**Iowa State**	Jack Trice Stadium • Ames, IA	FOX	**ISU** 34–17	52,881	
November 16	9:15 p.m.	Kansas	No. 6 **BYU**	LaVell Edwards Stadium • Provo, UT	ESPN	**KAN** 17–13	62,704	
^{#}Rankings from College Football Playoff. All times are in Central Time.

Date	Bye Week			
November 16	**Oklahoma State**	**TCU**	**Texas Tech**	**UCF**

==== Week Thirteen ====
Date	Time	Visiting team	Home team	Site	TV	Result	Attendance	Ref.
November 23	2:00 p.m.	**Arizona**	**TCU**	Amon G. Carter Stadium • Fort Worth, TX	ESPN+	**TCU** 49–28	42,977	
November 23	2:30 p.m.	No. 14 **BYU**	No. 21 **Arizona State**†	Mountain America Stadium • Tempe, AZ	ESPN	**ASU** 28–24	55,400	
November 23	2:30 p.m.	No. 16 **Colorado**	**Kansas**	Arrowhead Stadium • Kansas City, MO	FOX	**KU** 37–21	56,470	
November 23	2:30 p.m.	**Texas Tech**	**Oklahoma State**	Boone Pickens Stadium • Stillwater, OK	ESPN+	**TTU** 56–48	52,202	
November 23	2:30 p.m.	**UCF**	**West Virginia**	Milan Puskar Stadium • Morgantown, WV	ESPNU	**WVU** 31–21	40,722	
November 23	6:00 p.m.	**Baylor**	**Houston**	TDECU Stadium • Houston, TX	FS1	**BAY** 20–10	34,166	
November 23	6:30 p.m.	No. 22 **Iowa State**	**Utah**	Rice–Eccles Stadium • Salt Lake City, UT	FOX	**ISU** 31–28	52,152	
November 23	7:00 p.m.	**Cincinnati**	**Kansas State**	Bill Snyder Family Football Stadium • Manhattan, KS	ESPN2	**KSU** 41–15	50,988	
^{#}Rankings from College Football Playoff. All times are in Central Time.

==== Week Fourteen ====
Date	Time	Visiting team	Home team	Site	TV	Result	Attendance	Ref.
November 29	11:00 a.m.	**Oklahoma State**	No. 25 **Colorado**	Folsom Field • Boulder, CO	ABC	**COL** 52–0	51,030	
November 29	7:00 p.m.	**Utah**	**UCF**	FBC Mortgage Stadium • Orlando, FL	FOX	**UTAH** 28–14	40,747	
November 30	11:00 a.m.	**Kansas**	**Baylor**	McLane Stadium • Waco, TX	ESPN2	**BAY** 45–17	36,585	
November 30	11:00 a.m.	**West Virginia**	**Texas Tech**	Jones AT&T Stadium • Lubbock, TX	FS1	**TTU** 52–15	52,785	
November 30	2:30 p.m.	No. 16 **Arizona State**	**Arizona**	Arizona Stadium • Tucson, AZ (rivalry)	FOX	**ASU** 49–7	49,813	
November 30	5:00 p.m.	**TCU**	**Cincinnati**	Nippert Stadium • Cincinnati, OH	ESPN+	**TCU** 20–13	30,021	
November 30	6:30 p.m.	No. 24 **Kansas State**	No. 18 **Iowa State**	Jack Trice Stadium • Ames, IA (rivalry)	FOX	**ISU** 29–21	56,228	
November 30	9:15 p.m.	No. 19 **BYU**	**Houston**	LaVell Edwards Stadium • Provo, UT	ESPN	**BYU** 30–18	59,213	
^{#}Rankings from College Football Playoff. All times are in Central Time.

=== Championship Game ===
Date	Time	Visiting team	Home team	Site	TV	Result	Attendance	Ref.
December 7	11:00 a.m.	No. 16 **Iowa State**	No. 15 **Arizona State**	AT&T Stadium • Arlington, Texas	ABC	**ASU** 45–19	55,889	
^{#}Rankings from College Football Playoff. All times are in Central Time.

== Postseason ==
=== Bowl games ===
Legend
Big 12 win
Big 12 loss

For the 2024 bowl cycle, The Big 12 has yet announce how bowl tie ins will work with conference expansion. The four former Pac-12 Conference teams: Arizona, Arizona State, Colorado & Utah will have previous conference tie-ins to the Alamo Bowl, Independence Bowl, Holiday Bowl, Las Vegas Bowl, LA Bowl and Sun Bowl.

Bowl game	Date	Site	Time (CST)	Television	Big 12 team	Opponent	Score	Attendance
Frisco Bowl	December 17, 2024	Toyota Stadium • Frisco, TX	8:00 p.m.	ESPN	**West Virginia**	No. 25 Memphis	**L** 37−42	12,022
Rate Bowl	December 26, 2024	Chase Field • Phoenix, AZ	4:30 p.m.	ESPN	**Kansas State**	Rutgers	**W** 44−41	21,659
Liberty Bowl	December 27, 2024	Simmons Bank Liberty Stadium • Memphis, TN	6:00 p.m.	ESPN	**Texas Tech**	Arkansas	**L** 26−39	37,764
New Mexico Bowl	December 28, 2024	University Stadium • Albuquerque, NM	1:15 p.m.	ESPN	**TCU**	Louisiana	**W** 34−3	22,827
Pop-Tarts Bowl	December 28, 2024	Camping World Stadium • Orlando, FL	2:30 p.m.	ABC	No. 18 **Iowa State**	No. 13 Miami (FL)	**W** 42−41	38,650
Alamo Bowl	December 28, 2024	Alamodome • San Antonio, TX	6:30 p.m.	ABC	No. 17 **BYU**	No. 23 **Colorado****^1**	**BYU** 36−14	64,261
Texas Bowl	December 31, 2024	NRG Stadium • Houston, TX	2:30 p.m.	ESPN	**Baylor**	LSU	**L** 31−44	59,940
**College Football Playoff bowl games**
Peach Bowl	January 1, 2025	Mercedes-Benz Stadium • Atlanta, GA	12:00 p.m.	ESPN	No. 12 **Arizona State**	No. 3 Texas	**L** 31−39^{2OT}	71,105

Rankings are from CFP rankings. All times Central Time Zone. Big-12 teams shown in bold.

- **^1** Although BYU and Colorado are both currently in the Big 12, Colorado secured a spot in the Alamo Bowl based on the bowl's Pac-12 Conference legacy affiliations.

=== Selection of teams ===
- **Bowl eligible (9): Arizona State, Baylor, BYU, Colorado, Iowa State, Kansas State, TCU, Texas Tech, West Virginia**
- **Bowl-ineligible (7): Arizona, Cincinnati, Houston, Kansas, Oklahoma State, UCF, Utah**

== Head to head matchups ==
	Arizona	Arizona; State	Baylor	BYU	Cincinnati	Colorado	Houston	Iowa; State	Kansas	Kansas; State	Oklahoma; State	TCU	Texas; Tech	UCF	Utah	West; Virginia
vs. Arizona	—	1–0		1–0		1–0	0–1					1–0	1–0	1–0	0–1	1–0
vs. Arizona State	0–1	—		0–1	1–0				0–1	0–1	0–1		1–0	0–0	0–1	
vs. Baylor			—	1–0		1–0	0–1	1–0	1–0		0–1	0–1	0–1			0–1
vs. BYU	0–1	1–0	0–1	—			0–1		1–0	0–1	0–1			0–1	0–1	
vs. Cincinnati		0–1			—	1–0	0–1	1–0		1–0		1–0	1–0	0–1		1–0
vs. Colorado	0–1		0–1		0–1	—			1–0	1–0	0–1		0–1	0–1	0–1	
vs. Houston	1–0		1–0	1–0	1–0		—	1–0	1–0	0–1		0–1			0–1	
vs. Iowa State			0–1		0–1		0–1	—	1–0	0–1			1–0	0–1	0–1	0–1
vs. Kansas		1–0	1–0	0–1		0–1	0–1	0–1	—	1–0		1–0				1–0
vs. Kansas State		1–0		1–0	0–1	0–1	1–0	1–0	0–1	—	0–1					0–1
vs. Oklahoma State		1–0	1–0	1–0		0–1				1–0	—	1–0	1–0		1–0	1–0
vs. TCU	0–1		1–0		0–1		1–0		0–1		0–1	—	0–1	1–0	0–1	
vs. Texas Tech	0–1	0–1	1–0		0–1	1–0		0–1			0–1	1–0	—			0–1
vs. UCF	0–1	1–0		1–0	1–0	1–0		1–0				0–1		—	1–0	1–0
vs. Utah	1–0	1–0		1–0		1–0	1–0	1–0			0–1	1–0		0–1	—	
vs. West Virginia	0–1		1–0		0–1			1–0	0–1	1–0	0–1		1–0	0–1		—
Total	2–7	7–2	5–4	7–2	3–6	7–2	3–6	7–2	4–5	5–4	0–9	6–3	6–3	2–7	2–7	5–4

Updated thru 2024 Season.

Does not include Non-Conference matchups between Arizona vs. Kansas State and Baylor vs. Utah.

=== Big 12 vs Power 5 matchups ===
This is a list of the Power Five conferences teams (ACC, Big Ten, Notre Dame Pac-12 and SEC).

Date	Big 12 Team	Opponent	Conference	Location	Result
August 30	TCU	Stanford	ACC	Stanford Stadium • Stanford, CA	W 34–27
August 31	West Virginia	No. 8 Penn State	Big Ten	Milan Puskar Stadium • Morgantown, WV	L 12–34
September 6	BYU	SMU	ACC	Gerald J. Ford Stadium • Dallas, TX	W 15–18
September 7	Cincinnati	Pittsburgh	ACC	Nippert Stadium • Cincinnati, OH	L 27–28
September 7	Texas Tech	Washington State	Pac-12	Martin Stadium • Pullman, WA	L 16–37
September 7	Arizona State	Mississippi State	SEC	Mountain America Stadium • Tempe, AZ	W 30–23
September 7	No. 16 Oklahoma State	Arkansas	SEC	Boone Pickens Stadium • Stillwater, OK	W 39–31
September 7	Houston	No. 15 Oklahoma	SEC	Gaylord Family Oklahoma Memorial Stadium • Norman, OK	L 12–16
September 7	Colorado	Nebraska	Big Ten	Memorial Stadium • Lincoln, NE	L 10–28
September 7	No. 19 Kansas	Illinois	Big Ten	Memorial Stadium • Champaign, IL	L 17–23
September 7	Iowa State	No. 21 Iowa	Big Ten	Kinnick Stadium • Iowa City, IA	W 20–19
September 14	West Virginia†	Pittsburgh	ACC	Acrisure Stadium • Pittsburgh, PA	L 34–38
September 21	TCU	SMU	ACC	Gerald J. Ford Stadium • Dallas, TX	L 44–62
October 5	UCF	Florida	SEC	Ben Hill Griffin Stadium • Gainesville, FL	L 13–24

=== Big 12 vs Group of Five matchups ===
The following games include Big 12 teams competing against teams from The American, CUSA, MAC, Mountain West or Sun Belt.

Date	Conference	Visitor	Home	Site	Score
August 31	Mountain West	New Mexico	No. 21 Arizona	Arizona Stadium • Tucson, AZ	W 61–39
August 31	Mountain West	Wyoming	Arizona State	Mountain America Stadium • Tempe, AZ	W 48–7
August 31	Mountain West	UNLV	Houston	TDECU Stadium • Houston, TX	L 7–27
September 7	The American	No. 17 Kansas State	Tulane	Yulman Stadium • New Orleans, LA	W 34–27
September 7	CUSA	UCF	Sam Houston	FBC Mortgage Stadium • Orlando, FL	W 45–14
September 12	Sun Belt	Arizona State	Texas State	Bobcat Stadium • San Marcos, TX	W 31–28
September 13	Mountain West	UNLV	Kansas	Children's Mercy Park • Kansas City, KS	L 20–23
September 14	Mountain West	BYU	Wyoming	War Memorial Stadium • Laramie, WY	W 34–14
September 14	Mountain West	Air Force	Baylor	McLane Stadium • Waco, TX	W 31–3
September 14	Mountain West	Colorado	Colorado State	Canvas Stadium • Fort Collins, CO	W 28–9
September 14	Mountain West	Utah	Utah State	Maverik Stadium • Logan, UT	W 38–21
September 14	The American	Rice	Houston	TDECU Stadium • Houston, TX	W 33–7
September 14	The American	Oklahoma State	Tulsa	H.A. Chapman Stadium • Tulsa, OK	W 45–10
September 14	The American	North Texas	Texas Tech	Jones AT&T Stadium • Lubbock, TX	W 66–21
September 14	MAC	Cincinnati	Miami (OH)	Yager Stadium • Oxford, OH	W 27–16
September 21	Sun Belt	Arkansas State	No. 20 Iowa State	Jack Trice Stadium • Ames, IA	W 52–7

=== Big 12 vs FCS matchups ===
The Football Championship Subdivision comprises 13 conferences and two independent programs.

Date	Conference	Visitor	Home	Site	Score
August 29	BSC–OVC	Lindenwood	No. 22 Kansas	Children's Mercy Park • Kansas City, KS	W 48–3
August 29	Missouri Valley	North Dakota State	Colorado	Folsom Field • Boulder, CO	W 31–26
August 29	CAA	New Hampshire	UCF	FBC Mortgage Stadium • Orlando, FL	W 57–3
August 29	UAC	Southern Utah	No. 12 Utah	Rice–Eccles Stadium • Salt Lake City, UT	W 49–3
August 31	UAC	Tarleton State	Baylor	McLane Stadium • Waco, TX	W 45–3
August 31	UAC	Abilene Christian	Texas Tech	Jones AT&T Stadium • Lubbock, TX	W 52–51^{OT}
August 31	Missouri Valley	Southern Illinois	BYU	LaVell Edwards Stadium • Provo, UT	W 41–13
August 31	Missouri Valley	North Dakota	Iowa State	Jack Trice Stadium • Ames, IA	W 21–3
August 31	Missouri Valley	South Dakota State	No. 17 Oklahoma State	Boone Pickens Stadium • Stillwater, OK	W 44–20
August 31	BSC–OVC	UT Martin	No. 18 Kansas State	Bill Snyder Family Football Stadium • Manhattan, KS	W 41–6
August 31	CAA	Towson	Cincinnati	Nippert Stadium • Cincinnati, OH	W 38–20
September 7	CAA	Albany	West Virginia	Milan Puskar Stadium • Morgantown, WV	W 49–14
September 7	Big Sky	Northern Arizona	No. 20 Arizona	Arizona Stadium • Tucson, AZ	W 22–10
September 7	Northeast	LIU	TCU	Amon G. Carter Stadium • Fort Worth, TX	W 45–0

Note:† Denotes Neutral Site Game

=== Big 12 vs other conferences ===
Regular Season

Power 5 Conferences	Record
ACC	2–3
Big Ten	1–3
Notre Dame	0–0
Pac-12	0–1
SEC	2–2
Power 4 Total	5–9
Other FBS Conferences	Record
American	4–0
CUSA	1–0
Independents (Excluding Notre Dame)	0–0
MAC	1–0
Mountain West	6–2
Sun Belt	2–0
Other FBS Total	14–2
FCS Opponents	Record
Football Championship Subdivision	14–0
Total Non-Conference Record	33–11

Post Season

Power 5 Conferences	Record
ACC	1–0
Big Ten	1–0
SEC	0–3
Power 4 Total	2–3
Other FBS Conferences	Record
American	0–1
Sun Belt	1–0
Other FBS Total	1–1
Total Bowl Record	3–4

== Television Selections ==
The Big 12 Conference has television contracts with ESPN and FOX, which allow games to be broadcast across ABC, ESPN, ESPN2, ESPNU, FOX, FS1 and FS2. Streaming broadcasts for games under Big 12 control are streamed on ESPN+. Games under the control of other conferences fall under the contracts of the opposing conference.

Network	Wk 1	Wk 2	Wk 3	Wk 4	Wk 5	Wk 6	Wk 7	Wk 8	Wk 9	Wk 10	Wk 11	Wk 12	Wk 13	Wk 14	C	Bowls	Totals
ABC	–	1	–	–	–	–	–	–	–	–	–	–	–	1	1	2	5
ESPN	3	2	2	1	2	1	2	2	2	1	1	2	1	1	–	6	30
ESPN2	–	2	1	1	1	2	1	2	1	1	1	1	1	1	–	–	16
ESPNU	–	–	1	–	–	–	–	–	–	–	–	–	1	–	–	–	2
FOX	1	2	2	2	1	2	2	2	1	2	1	2	2	3	–	–	25
FS1	3	1	2	2	2	–	–	1	1	1	3	1	1	1	–	–	19
FS2	–	–	–	–	–	–	–	–	–	1	–	–	–	–	–	–	1
CBS	–	1	1	–	–	–	–	–	–	–	–	–	–	–	–	–	2
NBC	–	1	–	–	–	–	–	–	–	–	–	–	–	–	–	–	1
The CW	–	–	–	1	–	–	–	–	–	–	–	–	–	–	–	–	1
CBS Sports Network	–	–	2	–	–	–	–	–	–	–	–	–	–	–	–	–	2
SEC Network	–	1	–	–	–	1	–	–	–	–	–	–	–	–	–	–	2
ESPN+ (streaming)	9	4	1	1	1	–	–	2	2	–	–	–	2	1	–	–	23

Platform	Games
Broadcast	32
Cable	73
Streaming	23

== Awards and honors ==
=== Players of the week ===
Week	Offensive			Defensive			Special Teams			Newcomer		
Week	Player	Team	Position	Player	Team	Position	Player	Team	Position	Player	Team	Position
Week 1	Tetairoa McMillan	Arizona	WR	Trey Rucker	Oklahoma State	S	Drae McCray	Texas Tech	KR	Brendan Sorsby	Cincinnati	QB
Week 2	Cam Skattebo	Arizona State	RB	Nick Martin	Oklahoma State	LB	Kyle Konrardy	Iowa State	K	Obi Ezeigbo	Oklahoma State	DE
Week 3	RJ Harvey	UCF	RB	Travis Hunter	Colorado	DB	Dylan Edwards	Kansas State	PR	T.J. Jackson	West Virginia	DL
Week 4	Micah Bernard	Utah	RB	Tyrin Bradley Jr.	West Virginia	DL	Parker Kingston	BYU	PR	Isaac Wilson	Utah	QB
Week 5	Avery Johnson	Kansas State	QB	Tacario Davis	Arizona	DB	JP Richardson	TCU	PR	Brendan Sorsby (2)	Cincinnati	QB
Week 6	Tahj Brooks; Cam Skattebo (2)	Texas Tech; Arizona State	RB	A. J. Haulcy	Houston	DB	Tyler Loop	Arizona	PK	Sam Leavitt	Arizona State	QB
Week 7	Cam Skattebo (3)	Arizona State	RB	Caleb McCullough	Arizona State	LB	Cole Becker	Utah	PK	Jake Golday	Cincinnati	LB
Week 8	Sawyer Robertson	Baylor	QB	Cobee Bryant	Kansas	DB	Alejandro Mata	Colorado	PK	Bryson Washington	Baylor	RB
Week 9	Travis Hunter	Colorado	WR	Matt Jones	Baylor	LB	Will Ferrin; Chris Tennant	BYU; Kansas State	PK	Isaiah Augustave	Colorado	RB
Week 10	Cam Skattebo (4)	Arizona State	RB	Jacob Rodriguez	Texas Tech	LB	Isaiah Hankins; Liam Dougherty	Baylor; Houston	PK; P	Bryson Washington (2); Zeon Chriss	Baylor; Houston	RB; QB
Week 11	Shedeur Sanders	Colorado	QB	Mello Dotson; Anthony Wilson Jr.	Kansas; West Virginia	CB; S	Anthony Hughes	Arizona State	LB	Sam Leavitt (2)	Arizona State	QB
Week 12	Jordyn Tyson	Arizona State	WR	Genesis Smith; Amari McNeill; Reid Carrico	Arizona; Colorado; West Virginia	DB; DL; LB	LaJohntay Wester	Colorado	PR	Sam Leavitt (3)	Arizona State	QB
Week 13	Devin Neal	Kansas	RB	Javan Robinson	Arizona State	DB	Oliver Straw	West Virginia	P	Maealiuaki Smith	Oklahoma State	QB
Week 14	Cam Skattebo (5); Sawyer Robertson (2); Travis Hunter (2); Tahj Brooks (2)	Arizona State; Baylor; Colorado; Texas Tech	RB; QB; RB; WR	Zemaiah Vaughn	Utah	CB	Talan Alfrey; Gino Garcia; Ethan Craw	BYU; TCU; Texas Tech	S P PK	Bryson Washington (3)	RB	Baylor

==== Totals per school ====
School	Total
Arizona State	12
Colorado	8
Baylor	6
Texas Tech	5
West Virginia	5
Arizona	4
Oklahoma State	4
Utah	4
Cincinnati	3
Houston	3
Kansas	3
Kansas State	3
BYU	3
TCU	2
Iowa State	1
UCF	1

=== Big 12 individual awards ===
The following individuals received postseason honors as voted by the Big 12 Conference coaches at the end of the season.

Award	Player	School
Offensive Player of the Year	Shedeur Sanders	Colorado
Defensive Player of the Year	Travis Hunter	Colorado
Special Teams Player of the Year	Will Ferrin; Jaylin Noel	BYU; Iowa State
Offensive Freshman of the Year	Sam Leavitt	Arizona State
Offensive Lineman of the Year	Wyatt Milum	West Virginia
Defensive Freshman of the Year	Josiah Trotter	West Virginia
Defensive Lineman of the Year	Brendan Mott	Kansas State
Offensive Newcomer of the Year	Jordyn Tyson	Arizona State
Defensive Newcomer of the Year	BJ Green II	Colorado
Chuck Neinas Coach of the Year	Kenny Dillingham	Arizona State
# - Unanimous choice

=== All-Americans ===
Currently, the NCAA compiles consensus all-America teams in the sports of Division I-FBS football and Division I men's basketball using a point system computed from All-America teams named by coaches associations or media sources. The system consists of three points for a first-team honor, two points for second-team honor, and one point for third-team honor. Honorable mention and fourth team or lower recognitions are not accorded any points. College Football All-American consensus teams are compiled by position and the player accumulating the most points at each position is named first team consensus all-American. Currently, the NCAA recognizes All-Americans selected by the AP, AFCA, FWAA, TSN, and the WCFF to determine Consensus and Unanimous All-Americans. Any player named to the First Team by all five of the NCAA-recognized selectors is deemed a Unanimous All-American.

Position	Player	School	Selector	Unanimous	Consensus
First Team All-Americans
WR/CB/AP	Travis Hunter	Colorado	AFCA, AP, FWAA, TSN, WCFF, CBS, PFF, USAT, SI	✓	
OL	Wyatt Milum	West Virginia	AFCA, FWAA, TSN, WCFF, The Athletic, CBS, SI		✓
WR	Tetairoa McMillan	Arizona	AFCA, AP, The Athletic, CBS, PFF, USAT		✓
KR	Keelan Marion	BYU	FWAA, WCFF, CBS		
RB/AP	Cam Skattebo	Arizona State	AP, TSN, CBS, SI		
OL	Spencer Fano	Utah	PFF		

Position	Player	School	Selector	Unanimous	Consensus
Second Team All-Americans
OL	Spencer Fano	Utah	AP, WCFF, CBS, USAT		✓
WR	Tetairoa McMillan	Arizona	FWAA, TSN, WCFF, SI		
RB	Cam Skattebo	Arizona State	FWAA, AFCA, USAT		✓
DB	Cobee Bryant	Kansas	AFCA, TSN		✓
DB	Ra’Mello Dotson	Kansas	WCFF		
OL	Leif Fautanu	Arizona State	WCFF		
WR	Travis Hunter	Colorado	AP, CBS, USAT, CFN		
OL	Wyatt Milum	West Virginia	AP, USAT		
QB	Shedeur Sanders	Colorado	AP		
PR	Josh Cameron	Baylor	FWAA, CBS		
KR	Keelan Marion	BYU	TSN		✓
WR	Jayden Higgins	Iowa State	The Athletic		

Position	Player	School	Selector	Unanimous	Consensus
Third Team All-Americans
RB	RJ Harvey	UCF	AP, Phil Steele		
WR	Jordyn Tyson	Arizona State	AP		
DB	Ra’Mello Dotson	Kansas	AP		

==== List of All American Teams ====
- 2024 AFCA All-America Team
- 2024 Associated Press All-America Team
- 2024 FWAA All-America Team
- Sporting News 2024 College Football All-America Team
- Walter Camp Football Foundation 2024 All-America Team
- 2024 The Athletic All-America Team
- 2024 Athlon Sports College Football's Postseason All-America Team
- 2024 CBS Sports All-America Team
- 2024 College Football News
- 2024 ESPN All-America Team
- 2024 Fox Sports All-America Team
- 2024 PFF College All-America team
- 2024 Phil Steele's Postseason All-America Team
- Sports Illustrated 2024 All-America Team
- USA Today 2024 All-America Team

=== All-conference teams ===
The following players earned All-Big 12 honors. Any teams showing (_) following their name are indicating the number of All-Big 12 Conference Honors awarded to that university for 1st team and 2nd team respectively.

First Team

Position	Player	Class	Team
First Team Offense
QB	Shedeur Sanders	Sr.	Colorado
RB	Cam Skattebo	Sr.	Arizona State
RB	RJ Harvey	Gr.	UCF
FB	Jared Casey	Sr.	Kansas
WR	Tetairoa McMillan	Jr.	Arizona
WR	Jordyn Tyson	R−So.	Arizona State
WR	Travis Hunter	Jr.	Colorado
TE	Joe Royer	R−Jr.	Cincinnati
TE	Brant Kuithe	Sr.	Utah
OL	Leif Fautanu	R−Sr.	Arizona State
OL	Caleb Etienne	R−Sr.	BYU
OL	Luke Kandra	R−Sr.	Cincinnati
OL	Spencer Fano	Utah	So.
OL	Wyatt Milum	Sr.	West Virginia
First Team Defense
DL	Tyler Batty	Sr.	BYU
DL	Dontay Corleone	R-Jr.	Cincinnati
DL	B.J. Green II	Sr	Colorado
DL	Brendan Mott	Sr.	Kansas State
DL	T.J. Jackson II	Sr.	West Virginia
LB	Matt Jones	R−Sr	Baylor
LB	Keaton Thomas	R−So.	Baylor
LB	Jacob Rodriguez	R−Jr.	Texas Tech
DB	Xavion Alford	So.	Arizona State
DB	Travis Hunter	Jr.	Colorado
DB	A. J. Haulcy	Jr.	Houston
DB	Cobee Bryant†	Sr.	Kansas
DB	Mello Dotson	Sr.	Kansas
First Team Special Teams
PK	Will Ferrin	R−Jr.	BYU
P	Palmer Williams	So.	Baylor
RS	Josh Cameron	R−Jr.	Baylor
RS	Jaylin Noel	Sr.	Iowa State

Second Team

Position	Player	Class	Team
Second Team Offense
QB	Sam Leavitt	R−Fr.	Arizona State
RB	DJ Giddens	Jr.	Kansas State
RB	Tahj Brooks	Gr.	Texas Tech
FB	Stevo Klotz	R−Sr.	Iowa State
WR	Jayden Higgins	Sr.	Iowa State
WR	Jack Bech	Sr.	TCU
WR	Josh Kelly	Gr.	Texas Tech
TE	Chamon Metayer	R−Jr.	Arizona State
TE	Michael Trigg	R−Jr.	Baylor
TE	Garrett Oakley	So.	Kansas State
TE	Jalin Conyers	Sr.	Texas Tech
OL	Logan Brown	R−Jr.	Kansas
OL	Michael Ford Jr.	Sr.	Kansas
OL	Bryce Foster	R−Jr.	Kansas
OL	Easton Kilty	Sr.	Kansas State
OL	Sam Hecht	Jr.	Kansas State
Second Team Defense
DL	C.J. Fite	So.	Arizona State
DL	Lee Hunter	R−Jr.	UCF
DL	Keith Cooper Jr.	Sr.	Houston
DL	Dean Miller	R−Jr.	Kansas
DL	Van Fillinger	Sr.	Utah
LB	Keyshaun Elliott	Jr.	Arizona State
LB	Nikhai Hill-Green	Gr.	Colorado
LB	Austin Romaine	So.	Kansas State
DB	Tacario Davis	Jr.	Arizona
DB	Jakob Robinson	Sr.	BYU
DB	Jontez Williams	R−So.	Iowa State
DB	Malik Verdon	R−Jr.	Iowa State
DB	Bud Clark	Jr.	TCU
Second Team Special Teams
PK	Gino Garcia	R−Jr.	BYU
P	Jack Bouwmeester	Jr.	Utah
RS	Keelan Marion	R−Jr.	BYU

Notes:

- RS = Return Specialist
- AP/ST = All-Purpose/Special Teams Player (not a kicker or returner)
- † Two-time first team selection;
- ‡ Three-time first team selection

Honorable mentions

- Arizona: Dalton Johnson (DB), Tyler Loop (STPOY, K), Tetairoa McMillan (OPOY), Jonah Savaiinaea (OL)
- Arizona State: Xavion Alford (DNOY), Ben Coleman (OL), Leif Fautanu (OLOY), C.J. Fite (DLOY), Martell Hughes (DFOY), Caleb McCullough (LB), Myles Rowser (DB), Cam Skattebo (OPOY)
- Baylor: Omar Aigbedion (OL), Josh Cameron (STPOY, WR), Lorando Johnson (DB), Treven Ma’ae (DL), Jackie Marshall (DL), Keaton Thomas (DNOY), Bryson Washington (ONOY, OFOY), Gavin Yates (FB)
- BYU: Tyler Batty (DPOY, DLOY), Marque Collins (DB), Caleb Etienne (OLOY), Isaiah Glasker (LB), Brayden Keim (OL), Jack Kelly (DNOY, LB), Weylin Lapuaho (OL), Blake Mangelson (DL), Tommy Prassas (OFOY), Jake Retzlaff (QB)
- Cincinnati: Jared Bartlett (DPOY, LB), Dontay Corleone (DLOY), Mason Fletcher (P), Jake Golday (LB), Luke Kandra (OLOY), Jiquan Sanks (DFOY), Brendan Sorsby (ONOY)
- Colorado: Preston Hodge (DB), Travis Hunter (OPOY), Alejandro Mata (K), Taje McCoy (DFOY), DJ McKinney (DB), Chidozie Nwankwo (DLOY, DL), Jordan Seaton (OFOY, OL), Cam'Ron Silmon-Craig, Colorado (DB), Mark Vassett (P), LaJohntay Wester (ONOY, WR)
- Houston: Michael Batton (LB)
- Iowa State: Rocco Becht (QB), Benjamin Brahmer (TE), Jeremiah Cooper (DB), Beau Freyler (DB), Jarrod Hufford (OL), Kyle Konrardy (K), Jaylin Noel (WR), Domonique Orange (DL), Darien Porter (DB), Jalen Travis (OL), J. R. Singleton (DL)
- Kansas: JB Brown (LB), Logan Brown (OLOY), Bryce Cabeldue (OL), Mello Dotson (DPOY), Devin Neal (RB), Jereme Robinson (DL)
- Kansas State: Dylan Edwards (ONOY, KR/PR), Easton Kilty (OLOY), Brendan Mott (DPOY), Hadley Panzer (OL), Chiddi Obiazor (DOY), Jacob Parrish (DB), VJ Payne (DB), Tre Spivey (OFOY), Will Swanson (FB)
- Oklahoma State: Korie Black (DB), Ollie Gordon II (RB), Wes Pahl (P), Brennan Presley (WR), Joe Michalski (OL), Jake Springfield (OL)
- TCU: James Brockermeyer (OL), Abe Camara (DB), Devean Deal (DNOY, DL), Bless Harris (OL), Johnny Hodges (LB), Josh Hoover (QB), NaNa Osafo-Mensah (DL), JP Richardson (STPOY, KR/PR), Savion Williams (WR)
- Texas Tech: C.J. Baskerville (DB), Tahj Brooks (OPOY), Gino Garcia (STPOY), Josh Kelly (ONOY), Drae McCray (KR/PR), Jacob Rodriguez (DPOY), Caleb Rogers (OL)
- UCF: Ricky Barber (DLOY, DL), RJ Harvey (OPOY), Kobe Hudson (WR), Nyjalik Kelly (DL), Amari Kight (OL)
- Utah: Junior Tafuna (DL), Keanu Tanuvasa (DL)
- West Virginia: Preston Fox (KR/PR), TJ Jackson II (DNOY), Nick Malone (OL), Sean Martin (DL), Tomas Rimac (OL), Kole Taylor (TE), Josiah Trotter (LB)

=== National award winners ===
2024 College Football Award Winners

Award	Player	School
Polynesian Football Player of the Year Award	Tetairoa McMillan	Arizona
Heisman Trophy	Travis Hunter	Colorado
AP College Football Player of the Year	Travis Hunter	Colorado
Walter Camp Award	Travis Hunter	Colorado
SN College Football Player of the Year	Travis Hunter	Colorado
Lott Trophy (defensive impact)	Travis Hunter	Colorado
Paul Hornung Award (most versatile player)	Travis Hunter	Colorado
Fred Biletnikoff Award	Travis Hunter	Colorado
Chuck Bednarik Award	Travis Hunter	Colorado
Johnny Unitas Golden Arm Award	Shedeur Sanders	Colorado

== Rankings ==
Legend
	Improvement in ranking
	Drop in ranking
	Not ranked previous week
	No change in ranking from previous week
RV	Received votes but were not ranked in Top 25 of poll
т	Tied with team above or below also with this symbol

		Pre	Wk 1	Wk 2	Wk 3	Wk 4	Wk 5	Wk 6	Wk 7	Wk 8	Wk 9	Wk 10	Wk 11	Wk 12	Wk 13	Wk 14	Wk 15	Final
Arizona	AP	21	20	20	RV	RV	RV											
Arizona	C	21	18	18	RV	RV	RV	RV										
Arizona	CFP	Not released																
Arizona State	AP				RV				RV			RV	RV	21	15	12	10	7
Arizona State	C			RV	RV			RV	RV	RV	RV	RV	RV	22	15	13	10	7
Arizona State	CFP	Not released											21	16	15	12		
Baylor	AP															RV	RV	
Baylor	C														RV			
Baylor	CFP	Not released																
BYU	AP			RV	RV	22	17	14	13	11	9	9	7	14	19	17	17	13
BYU	C			RV	RV	22	19	15	13	12	12	9	8	15	20	18	17	14
BYU	CFP	Not released									9	6	14	19	18	17		
Cincinnati	AP																	
Cincinnati	C																	
Cincinnati	CFP	Not released																
Colorado	AP	RV	RV				RV	RV			23	21	18	16	23	20	20	25
Colorado	C	RV					RV	RV			RV	24	20	18	RV	22	22	25
Colorado	CFP	Not released									20	17	16	25	23	23		
Houston	AP																	
Houston	C																	
Houston	CFP	Not released																
Iowa State	AP	RV	RV	21	20	18	16	11т	9	10	11т	17	RV	22	17	16	18	15
Iowa State	C	RV	RV	23	21	19	16	13	12	10	10	18	25	21	17	16	19	15
Iowa State	CFP	Not released									17		22	18	16	18		
Kansas	AP	22	19	RV														
Kansas	C	24	20	RV														
Kansas	CFP	Not released																
Kansas State	AP	18	17	14	13	23	20	18т	17	16	17	22	20	RV	RV	RV	RV	RV
Kansas State	C	17	16	15	14	25	20	19	17	16	15	21	18	25	RV	RV	RV	RV
Kansas State	CFP	Not released									19	16		24				
Oklahoma State	AP	17	16	13	14	20	RV											
Oklahoma State	C	18	17	14	15	20	RV											
Oklahoma State	CFP	Not released																
TCU	AP			RV														RV
TCU	C			RV														
TCU	CFP	Not released																
Texas Tech	AP								RV			RV						
Texas Tech	C	RV						RV	RV			RV						
Texas Tech	CFP	Not released																
UCF	AP			RV	RV	RV												
UCF	C	RV		RV	RV	RV												
UCF	CFP	Not released																
Utah	AP	12	11	12	12	10	18	16	RV									
Utah	C	13	11	10	10	10	18	17	RV									
Utah	CFP	Not released																
West Virginia	AP	RV	RV															
West Virginia	C	RV																
West Virginia	CFP	Not released																

== Home game announced attendance ==
Team	Stadium	Capacity	Game 1	Game 2	Game 3	Game 4	Game 5	Game 6	Game 7	Total	Average	% of capacity
Arizona	Arizona Stadium	50,782	44,748	47,746	45,773	**50,782**†	49,888	38,538	49,813	327,288	46,755	92.07%
Arizona State	Mountain America Stadium	53,599	48,108	45,504	**54,639**	45,310	44,940	**55,400**†		293,901	48,984	91.38%
Baylor	McLane Stadium	45,140	42,272	**46,212**†	39,583	44,987	44,171	36,585		253,810	42,302	93.71%
BYU	LaVell Edwards Stadium	62,073	**63,712**	**64,201**	**64,420**†	**62,841**	**62,704**	59,213		377,091	62,849	101.25%
Cincinnati	Nippert Stadium	38,088	37,654	37,992	38,007†	38,007†	38,007†	30,021		219,688	36,615	96.13%
Colorado	Folsom Field	50,183	49,438	**52,794**	**53,972**	**53,202**	**54,646**†	51,030		315,082	52,514	104.64%
Houston	TDECU Stadium	40,000	25,750	28,146	25,138	28,251	23,085	34,166†		164,536	26,074	65.18%
Iowa State	Jack Trice Stadium	61,500	56,148	55,428	**61,500**†	**61,500**†	**61,500**†	52,881	56,228	405,185	57,884	94.12%
Kansas	Arrowhead Stadium (Note: Kansas' normal home of David Booth Kansas Memorial Stadium is closed for renovations in 2024. The Jayhawks are playing non-conference games at Children's Mercy Park (capacity 18,467) and conference games at Arrowhead Stadium.)	76,416	**20,829** (Note: Game played at Children's Mercy Park.)	**21,493**	47,928	38,619	51,119	56,470†		236,468	39,411	51.57%
Kansas State	Bill Snyder Family Stadium	50,000	**51,240**	**51,240**	**51,741**	**52,074**†	**51,880**	**50,988**		309,163	51,527	103.05%
Oklahoma State	Boone Pickens Stadium	52,305	52,202†	52,202†	52,202†	52,202†	52,202†	52,202†		313,212	52,202	99.80%
TCU	Amon G. Carter Stadium	47,000	44,063	**48,889**†	44,211	42,144	45,348	42,977		267,632	44,605	94.90%
Texas Tech	Jones AT&T Stadium	60,229	**60,229**†	57,865	58,795	**60,229**†	**60,229**†	**60,229**†	52,785	410,631	58,623	97.33%
UCF	FBC Mortgage Stadium	44,206	**44,206**	43,807	**45,702**†	42,611	42,144	42,110	40,747	301,327	43,074	97.43%
Utah	Rice–Eccles Stadium	51,444	**52,210**	**52,827**	**52,898**	**53,299**	**54,383**†	**52,152**		317,769	52,962	102.94%
West Virginia	Milan Puskar Stadium	60,000	**62,084**†	50,073	52,428	55,202	54,327	52,376	40,722	367,212	52,459	87.43%
Total		52,685								4,879,995	48,316	91.70%

Bold – at or exceeded capacity
† Season high
‡ Record stadium Attendance

== NFL draft ==
The NFL draft will be held at Lambeau Field in Green Bay, Wisconsin. The following list includes all Big 12 players in the draft.

=== List of selections ===
Player	Position	School	Draft round	Round pick	Overall pick	Team
Travis Hunter	WR/CB	Colorado	1	2	2	Jacksonville Jaguars
Tetairoa McMillan	WR	Arizona	1	8	7	Carolina Panthers
Jayden Higgins	WR	Iowa State	2	2	34	Houston Texans
Jonah Savaiinaea	OG	Arizona	2	5	37	Miami Dolphins
Jack Bech	WR	TCU	2	26	58	Miami Dolphins
RJ Harvey	RB	UCF	2	28	60	Denver Broncos
Darien Porter	CB	Iowa State	3	4	68	Las Vegas Raiders
Nick Martin	LB	Oklahoma State	3	11	75	San Francisco 49ers
Jaylin Noel	WR	Iowa State	3	15	79	Houston Texans
Jacob Parrish	CB	Kansas State	3	21	84	Tampa Bay Buccaneers
Savion Williams	WR	TCU	3	24	87	Green Bay Packers
Wyatt Milum	G	West Virginia	3	26	89	Jacksonville Jaguars
Caleb Rogers	T	Texas Tech	3	35	98	Las Vegas Raiders
Cam Skattebo	RB	Arizona State	4	3	105	New York Giants
Jalen Travis	T	Iowa State	4	25	127	Indianapolis Colts
Shedeur Sanders	QB	Colorado	5	6	144	Cleveland Browns
Mac McWilliams	CB	UCF	5	7	145	Philadelphia Eagles
DJ Giddens	RB	Kansas State	5	13	151	Indianapolis Colts
Collin Oliver	LB	Oklahoma State	5	21	159	Green Bay Packers
Marques Sigle	S	Kansas State	5	22	160	San Francisco 49ers
Ollie Gordon II	RB	Oklahoma State	6	3	179	Miami Dolphins
Devin Neal	RB	Kansas	6	8	185	New Orleans Saints
Tyler Loop	K	Arizona	6	10	186	Baltimore Ravens
Bryce Cabeldue	G	Kansas	6	16	192	Seattle Seahawks
Tahj Brooks	RB	Texas Tech	6	17	19	Cincinnati Bengals
LaJohntay Wester	WR	Colorado	6	26	203	Cincinnati Bengals
Jimmy Horn Jr.	WR	Colorado	6	31	208	Carolina Panthers
Caleb Lohner	TE	Utah	7	25	241	Denver Broncos
Jacory Croskey-Merritt	RB	Arizona	7	29	245	Washington Commanders
Korie Black	CB	Oklahoma State	7	30	246	New York Giants
John Williams	T	Cincinnati	7	34	250	Green Bay Packers

=== Total picks by school ===
Team	Round 1	Round 2	Round 3	Round 4	Round 5	Round 6	Round 7	Total
Arizona	1	1	0	0	0	1	1	4
Arizona State	0	0	0	1	0	0	0	1
Baylor	0	0	0	0	0	0	0	0
BYU	0	0	0	0	0	0	0	0
Cincinnati	0	0	0	0	0	0	1	1
Colorado	1	0	0	0	1	2	0	4
Houston	0	0	0	0	0	0	0	0
Iowa State	0	1	2	1	0	0	0	4
Kansas	0	0	0	0	0	2	0	2
Kansas State	0	0	1	0	2	0	0	3
Oklahoma State	0	0	1	0	1	1	1	4
TCU	0	1	1	0	0	0	0	2
Texas Tech	0	0	1	0	0	1	0	2
UCF	0	1	0	0	1	0	0	2
Utah	0	0	0	0	0	0	1	1
West Virginia	0	0	1	0	0	0	0	1
Total	2	4	7	2	5	7	4	31
