= Xavion Alford =

American football player

No. 2 – Arizona State Sun Devils
- Position: Safety
- Class: Redshirt Senior

Personal information
- Listed height: 5 ft 11 in (1.80 m)
- Listed weight: 200 lb (91 kg)

Career information
- High school: Shadow Creek (Pearland, Texas)
- College: Texas (2020); USC (2021–2022); Arizona State (2023–2025)

Awards and highlights
- First-team All-Big 12 (2024)
- Stats at ESPN

Xavion M. Alford Jr. is an American college football defensive back for the Arizona State Sun Devils. He previously played for the Texas Longhorns and for the USC Trojans.

== Early life ==
Alford attended Shadow Creek High School in Pearland, Texas. As a junior, he tallied 58 tackles, 20 pass deflections, and six interceptions, as he helped lead his team to state championship appearance. Coming out of high school, Alford was rated as a four-star recruit and the eighth overall safety in the class of 2020, and committed to play college football for the Texas Longhorns over offers from schools such as Alabama, Auburn, and Texas A&M.

== College career ==
=== Texas ===
As a freshman in 2020, Alford notched four tackles in a reserve role for the Longhorns. After the season, he entered his name into the NCAA transfer portal.

=== USC ===
Alford transferred to play for the USC Trojans. In his first season with the Trojans in 2021, he appeared in 11 games with two starts, where he posted 31 tackles, three pass deflections, and three interceptions. However, Alford missed the entirety of the 2022 season due to an injury. After the season, he once again entered his name into the NCAA transfer portal.

=== Arizona State ===
Alford transferred to play for the Arizona State Sun Devils. He missed the entirety of the 2023 seasons due to NCAA eligibility issues due to his transfer. In 2024, Alford totaled 85 tackles, five pass deflections, and two interceptions, earning first-team all-Big 12 Conference honors. Instead of declaring for the 2025 NFL draft, Alford decided to return to play for the Sun Devils with his final year of eligibility in 2025.

== Professional career ==
Pre-draft measurables
Height	Weight	Arm length	Hand span	Wingspan	40-yard dash	10-yard split	20-yard split	20-yard shuttle	Vertical jump	Broad jump	Bench press
5 ft 11 3/8 in (1.81 m)	200 lb (91 kg)	32 in (0.81 m)	9 3/4 in (0.25 m)	6 ft 4 in (1.93 m)	4.55 s	1.61 s	2.64 s	4.37 s	37.5 in (0.95 m)	10 ft 5 in (3.18 m)	16 reps
All values from Pro Day
