= Luke Kandra =

American football player (born 2001)

Profile
- Position: Guard

Personal information
- Born: August 8, 2001 (age 25); Cincinnati, Ohio, U.S.
- Listed height: 6 ft 5 in (1.96 m)
- Listed weight: 319 lb (145 kg)

Career information
- High school: Elder (Cincinnati, Ohio)
- College: Louisville (2020–2022); Cincinnati (2023–2024)
- NFL draft: 2025: undrafted

Career history
- Carolina Panthers (2025)*
- * Offseason or practice squad member only

Awards and highlights
- 2× First-team All-Big 12 (2023, 2024)
- Stats at Pro Football Reference

Luke Kandra (born August 8, 2001) is an American professional football guard. He played college football for the Louisville Cardinals and Cincinnati Bearcats.

== Early life ==
Kandra is from Cincinnati, Ohio. He grew up playing football as a quarterback before switching to guard by the time he attended Elder High School in Cincinnati. As a junior, he was selected second-team all-district. He was then named All-Ohio and helped his team compile a record of 12–3 in his senior year, with Elder finishing as the runner-up at the Division I state championship. A three-star prospect and one of the top-50 recruits in Ohio, he committed to play college football for the Louisville Cardinals.

== College career ==
Kandra redshirted as a freshman at Louisville in 2020. He then appeared in 21 games for Louisville from 2021 to 2022, mainly on special teams, also appearing in two games as a starter during the 2022 season. He transferred to the Cincinnati Bearcats in 2023. That year, he was ranked by Pro Football Focus (PFF) as the best offensive lineman on the team, with Kandra starting all 12 games and being named first-team All-Big 12 Conference and second-team All-American by the Walter Camp Foundation. As a senior in 2024, he was rated the best right guard in the conference by PFF for a second consecutive year, being selected first-team All-Big 12 and second-team All-American while starting 12 games. He did not allow a single sack in his last year. At the conclusion of his collegiate career, he was invited to the NFL Scouting Combine, where he led all participants in the bench press.

== Professional career ==
Pre-draft measurables
Height	Weight	Arm length	Hand span	Wingspan	40-yard dash	20-yard split	20-yard shuttle	Three-cone drill	Vertical jump	Broad jump	Bench press
6 ft 4 3/4 in (1.95 m)	319 lb (145 kg)	31 7/8 in (0.81 m)	10 in (0.25 m)	6 ft 8 1/2 in (2.04 m)	5.17 s	2.96 s	4.78 s	8.33 s	32.5 in (0.83 m)	9 ft 5 in (2.87 m)	33 reps
All values from NFL Combine/Pro Day

On May 8, 2025, Kandra signed with the Carolina Panthers as an undrafted free agent after going unselected in the 2025 NFL draft. He was waived on August 25.
