= Wyatt Milum =

American football player (born 2002)

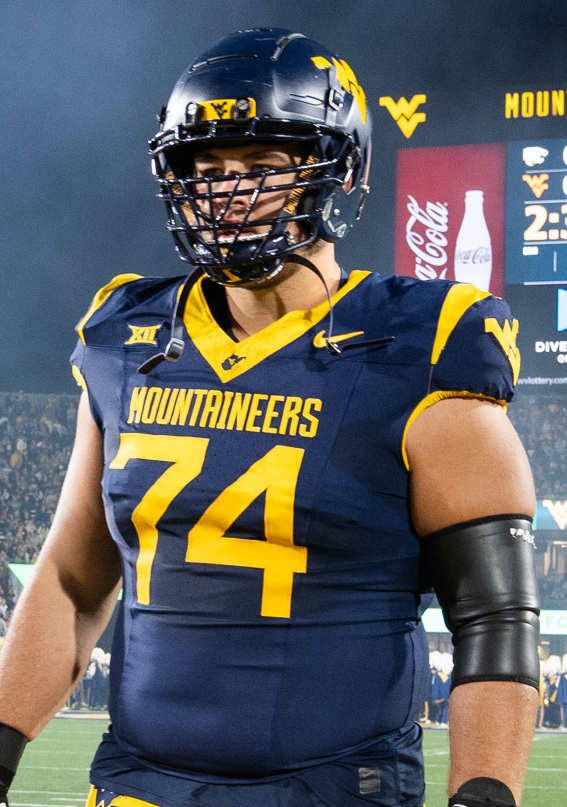
- Milum with the West Virginia Mountaineers in 2024

No. 64 – Jacksonville Jaguars
- Position: Offensive tackle
- Roster status: Active

Personal information
- Born: December 27, 2002 (age 23); Kenova, West Virginia, U.S.
- Listed height: 6 ft 6 in (1.98 m)
- Listed weight: 317 lb (144 kg)

Career information
- High school: Spring Valley (Huntington, West Virginia)
- College: West Virginia (2021–2024)
- NFL draft: 2025: 3rd round, 89th overall pick

Career history
- Jacksonville Jaguars (2025–present)

Awards and highlights
- Consensus All-American (2024); Big 12 Offensive Lineman of the Year (2024); First-team All-Big 12 (2024); Second-team All-Big 12 (2023)

Career NFL statistics as of 2025
- Games played: 10
- Stats at Pro Football Reference

Wyatt Milum (MY-lum; born December 27, 2002) is an American professional football offensive tackle for the Jacksonville Jaguars of the National Football League (NFL). He played college football for the West Virginia Mountaineers and was selected by the Jaguars in the third round of the 2025 NFL draft.

== Early life ==
Milum grew up in Kenova, West Virginia and attended Spring Valley High School, where he was a top football and baseball player. He was selected all-state three times, including two first-team selections as a junior and senior. He allowed no sacks in his high school career and was ranked a four-star recruit and the top right tackle nationally. As a senior in 2020, Milum was chosen the winner of the Joe Stydahar Award for being the best lineman in the state. He received an invitation to the All-American Bowl and was named the MaxPreps West Virginia Player of the Year. He committed to play college football for the West Virginia Mountaineers.

== College career ==
As a true freshman at West Virginia in 2021, Milum played in 12 games, eight as a starter, at right tackle, being selected a Freshman All-American by several selectors. He moved to left tackle prior to the 2022 season. He started all 12 games in the 2022 season. He then allowed no sacks and no quarterback hits in the 2023 season and was selected second-team All-Big 12 Conference. He announced his return for a final season in 2024.

== Professional career ==
Pre-draft measurables
| Height | Weight | Arm length | Hand span | Wingspan | 40-yard dash | 10-yard split | 20-yard split | 20-yard shuttle | Three-cone drill | Vertical jump | Broad jump |
|---|---|---|---|---|---|---|---|---|---|---|---|
| 6 ft 6 1/2 in (1.99 m) | 313 lb (142 kg) | 32 1/8 in (0.82 m) | 10 1/4 in (0.26 m) | 6 ft 7 1/2 in (2.02 m) | 5.27 s | 1.84 s | 3.08 s | 4.69 s | 7.59 s | 30.0 in (0.76 m) | 9 ft 0 in (2.74 m) |
All values from NFL Combine/Pro Day

Milum was selected by the Jacksonville Jaguars in the third round, with the 89th overall selection in the 2025 NFL draft.
