= Tacario Davis =

American football player (born 2004)

No. 20 – Cincinnati Bengals
- Position: Cornerback
- Roster status: Active

Personal information
- Born: August 17, 2004 (age 22)
- Listed height: 6 ft 4 in (1.93 m)
- Listed weight: 194 lb (88 kg)

Career information
- High school: Millikan (Long Beach)
- College: Arizona (2022–2024); Washington (2025)
- NFL draft: 2026: 3rd round, 72nd overall pick

Career history
- Cincinnati Bengals (2026–present)

Awards and highlights
- Second-team All-Pac-12 (2023); Second-team All-Big 12 (2024)

Career NFL statistics as of Week 4, 2026
- Tackles: 10
- Pass deflections: 1
- Stats at Pro Football Reference

Tacario Davis (born August 17, 2004) is an American professional football cornerback for the Cincinnati Bengals of the National Football League (NFL). He played college football for the Washington Huskies and the Arizona Wildcats and was selected by the Bengals in the third round of the 2026 NFL draft.

== Early life ==
Davis was born on August 17, 2004, and grew up in Long Beach, California. He attended Millikan High School in Long Beach where he played both defensive back and wide receiver, totaling 74 tackles along with 26 receptions for 463 yards in his high school career. In his final year, he was a first-team All-Moore League selection and a team captain. He was ranked a three-star recruit by 247Sports. He committed to play college football for the Arizona Wildcats over the Kansas Jayhawks and Arizona State Sun Devils.

== College career ==
Davis appeared in five games for the Wildcats as a true freshman in 2022. He posted seven total tackles. He "emerged as one of the top cornerbacks nationally" in the 2023 season, playing 13 games, 11 as a starter, while totaling 25 tackles, an interception, and leading the Pac-12 Conference in both pass breakups (15) and passes defended (16). He was named a second-team All-Pac 12 selection by the Associated Press (AP).

Davis entered the NCAA transfer portal after the 2023 season but ultimately returned to Arizona in 2024.

However, on December 11, 2024, Davis announced that he would officially enter the transfer portal and in January announced his commitment to Washington, reuniting with head coach Jedd Fisch.

== Professional career ==
Pre-draft measurables
Height	Weight	Arm length	Hand span	Wingspan	40-yard dash	10-yard split	20-yard split	Vertical jump	Broad jump	Bench press
6 ft 3 7/8 in (1.93 m)	194 lb (88 kg)	33 3/8 in (0.85 m)	9 1/4 in (0.23 m)	6 ft 8 7/8 in (2.05 m)	4.41 s	1.59 s	2.59 s	37.0 in (0.94 m)	10 ft 3 in (3.12 m)	10 reps
All values from NFL Combine/Pro Day

Davis was selected by the Cincinnati Bengals in the third round with the 72nd overall pick in the 2026 NFL draft.
