= Mello Dotson =

American football player (born 2002)

Ra'Mello Dotson
No. 33 – Dallas Renegades
- Position: Cornerback
- Roster status: Active

Personal information
- Born: February 19, 2002 (age 24); Daytona Beach, Florida, U.S.
- Listed height: 6 ft 1 in (1.85 m)
- Listed weight: 183 lb (83 kg)

Career information
- High school: Mainland (Daytona Beach)
- College: Kansas (2020–2024)
- NFL draft: 2025: undrafted

Career history
- Las Vegas Raiders (2025)*; Carolina Panthers (2025)*; Houston Gamblers (2026); Dallas Renegades (2027–present)
- * Offseason or practice squad member only

Awards and highlights
- First-team All-Big 12 (2024)
- Stats at Pro Football Reference

Ra'Mello Dotson (born February 19, 2002) is an American former professional football cornerback for the Dallas Renegades of the United Football League (UFL). He played college football for the Kansas Jayhawks and was signed by the Las Vegas Raiders and Carolina Panthers as an undrafted free agent in 2025.

== Early life ==
Dotson attended Mainland High School in Daytona Beach, Florida. He was rated as a two-star recruit and committed to play college football for the Kansas Jayhawks over offers from schools such as Central Michigan, FAU, and Georgia State.

== College career ==
In his first three collegiate seasons from 2020 through 2022, Dotson appeared in 28 games, where he notched 90 tackles with one being for a loss, seven pass deflections, three interceptions, a forced fumble, and a fumble recovery. In week 2 of the 2023 season, he hauled in an interception in a win over Illinois. In week 10, Dotson intercepted a pass that he returned 50 yards for a touchdown in a win over Iowa State. He finished the 2023 season, notching 48 tackles with three being for a loss, a sack, 11 pass deflections, four interceptions, and two touchdowns. In the 2024 season opener, Dotson intercepted a pass which he returned 33 yards for a touchdown in win over Lindenwood.

== Professional career ==
Pre-draft measurables
Height	Weight	Arm length	Hand span	Wingspan	40-yard dash	10-yard split	20-yard split	Vertical jump	Broad jump
6 ft 0 5/8 in (1.84 m)	192 lb (87 kg)	31 1/2 in (0.80 m)	8 1/2 in (0.22 m)	6 ft 5 7/8 in (1.98 m)	4.59 s	1.53 s	2.68 s	34.5 in (0.88 m)	10 ft 3 in (3.12 m)
All values from NFL Combine

=== Las Vegas Raiders ===
On May 9, 2025, Dotson signed with the Las Vegas Raiders as an undrafted free agent after going unselected in the 2025 NFL draft. On July 22, Dotson was waived by the Raiders.

=== Carolina Panthers ===
On July 25, 2025, Dotson signed with the Carolina Panthers. He was waived on August 25.

=== Houston Gamblers ===
On January 13, 2026, Dotson was selected by the Houston Gamblers in the 2026 UFL Draft. He retired on March 9, but re-signed on April 22.
