= Van Fillinger =

American football player

Profile
- Position: Defensive end
- Class: Senior

Personal information
- Listed height: 6 ft 4 in (1.93 m)
- Listed weight: 247 lb (112 kg)

Career information
- High school: Corner Canyon (Draper, Utah)
- College: Utah (2020–2024)

Awards and highlights
- Second-team All-Big 12 (2024)
- Stats at ESPN

Van Fillinger is an American college football defensive end who played for the Utah Utes.

== Early life ==
Fillinger attended Corner Canyon High School in Draper, Utah. He was rated as a three-star recruit and committed to play college football for the Texas Longhorns. However, Fillinger flipped his commitment to play for the Utah Utes.

== College career ==
Fillinger appeared in 19 games in his first two collegiate seasons in 2020 and 2021, recording 45 tackles with ten being for a loss, and five and a half sacks. In 2022, he played in just eight games before suffering a season-ending injury, finishing with 18 tackles with five being for a loss, five sacks, and a forced fumble. In 2023, Fillinger played in 11 games with eight starts for Utah, where he totaled 31 tackles with five being for a loss, three sacks, a forced fumble, and a fumble recovery. In week 3 of the 2024 season, he notched a sack and blocked a kick in a win over Baylor. Midway through the 2024 season, Fillinger was added to the Lombardi Award watchlist.

== Professional career ==
Pre-draft measurables
| Height | Weight | 40-yard dash | 20-yard shuttle | Three-cone drill | Vertical jump | Broad jump | Bench press |
|---|---|---|---|---|---|---|---|
| 6 ft 3 3/4 in (1.92 m) | 247 lb (112 kg) | 4.95 s | 4.50 s | 7.39 s | 34.0 in (0.86 m) | 9 ft 9 in (2.97 m) | 30 reps |
All values from Pro Day
