= Cobee Bryant =

American football player (born 2001)

Profile
- Position: Cornerback

Personal information
- Born: September 17, 2001 (age 25); Evergreen, Alabama, U.S.
- Listed height: 6 ft 0 in (1.83 m)
- Listed weight: 180 lb (82 kg)

Career information
- High school: Hillcrest (Evergreen)
- College: Kansas (2021–2024)
- NFL draft: 2025: undrafted

Career history
- Atlanta Falcons (2025–2026)

Awards and highlights
- 3× First-team All-Big 12 (2022–2024)

Career NFL statistics as of 2025
- Total tackles: 10
- Pass deflections: 1
- Stats at Pro Football Reference

Jacobee Bryant (born September 17, 2001) is an American professional football cornerback. He played college football for the Kansas Jayhawks.

== Early life ==
Bryant attended Hillcrest High School in Evergreen, Conecuh County, Alabama. As a senior, he had 38 tackles and eight interceptions with five being returned for a touchdown. He committed to the University of Kansas.

== College career ==
As a true freshman at Kansas in 2021, Bryant played in 11 games with seven starts and had 22 tackles and two interceptions, with one returned for a touchdown. As a sophomore in 2022, he started 11 of 12 games, recording 38 tackles, three interceptions and one touchdown. As a junior in 2023, he started 12 of 13 games and finished with 32 tackles, four interceptions and one sack. Bryant returned to Kansas for his senior season in 2024.

== Professional career ==
Pre-draft measurables
| Height | Weight | Arm length | Hand span | Wingspan | 40-yard dash | 10-yard split | 20-yard split |
|---|---|---|---|---|---|---|---|
| 6 ft 0 in (1.83 m) | 180 lb (82 kg) | 31 1/4 in (0.79 m) | 9 1/4 in (0.23 m) | 6 ft 5 in (1.96 m) | 4.53 s | 1.56 s | 2.60 s |
All values from NFL Combine

After going unselected in the 2025 NFL draft, Bryant signed with the Atlanta Falcons as an undrafted free agent on April 28, 2025. He was waived on August 26 as part of final roster cuts and re-signed to the practice squad the next day. Bryant was promoted to the active roster on November 22.

On August 30, 2026, Bryant was waived by the Falcons as a part of final roster cuts; he was re-signed to the team's practice squad the following day. Bryant was waived by the Falcons on September 2.

== NFL career statistics ==
=== Regular season ===
| Year | Team | Games | | Tackles | | | | Interceptions | | | | | | Fumbles | |
| Year | Team | GP | GS | Comb | Solo | Ast | Sck | PD | Int | Yds | Avg | Lng | TDs | FF | FR |
|---|---|---|---|---|---|---|---|---|---|---|---|---|---|---|---|
| 2025 | ATL | 7 | 1 | 10 | 8 | 2 | 0.0 | 1 | 0 | 0 | 0.0 | 0 | 0 | 0 | 0 |
| Career | | 7 | 1 | 10 | 8 | 2 | 0.0 | 1 | 0 | 0 | 0.0 | 0 | 0 | 0 | 0 |
