= B. J. Green =

American football player (born 2003)

B.J. Green II
No. 95 – Jacksonville Jaguars
- Position: Defensive end
- Roster status: Injured reserve

Personal information
- Born: July 3, 2003 (age 23); Nashville, Tennessee, U.S.
- Listed height: 6 ft 1 in (1.85 m)
- Listed weight: 270 lb (122 kg)

Career information
- High school: McEachern High School (Powder Springs, Georgia) Prince Avenue Christian School (Bogart, Georgia)
- College: Arizona State (2021–2023); Colorado (2024)
- NFL draft: 2025: undrafted

Career history
- Jacksonville Jaguars (2025–present)

Awards and highlights
- Big 12 Defensive Newcomer of the Year (2024); First-team All-Big 12 (2024); Second-team All-Pac-12 (2023)

Career NFL statistics as of Week 1, 2026
- Total tackles: 15
- Sacks: 2
- Fumble recoveries: 1
- Stats at Pro Football Reference

B. J. Green II (born July 3, 2003) is an American professional football defensive end for the Jacksonville Jaguars of the National Football League (NFL). He played college football for the Arizona State Sun Devils and Colorado Buffaloes.

== Early life ==
Green attended McEachern High School, before transferring to Prince Avenue Christian School in Bogart, Georgia, his senior year. He won a State Championship during the 2020 season. He joined the Arizona State Sun Devils as a preferred walk-on.

== College career ==
=== Arizona State ===
In his first collegiate game in week one of the 2021 season, Green tallied a sack in a win over Southern Utah. In the 2021 Las Vegas Bowl, he recorded two sacks in a loss versus Wisconsin. Green finished his freshman season playing in 12 games where he notched eight tackles with five being for a loss, and five sacks. After the season, Green was awarded a scholarship by the Sun Devils. Green finished the 2022 season notching 13 tackles with four and a half being for a loss, and two and a half sacks. During the 2023 season, Green tallied 39 tackles with 11.5 being for a loss, six sacks, and a forced fumble, earning second-team all-Pac-12 Conference honors. After the conclusion of the 2023 season, Green entered his name into the NCAA transfer portal.

=== Colorado ===
Green initially announced his transfer to play for the Washington Huskies. However, he flipped his commitment to play for the Colorado Buffaloes.

== Professional career ==
Pre-draft measurables
Height	Weight	Arm length	Hand span	Wingspan	40-yard dash	10-yard split	20-yard split	20-yard shuttle	Three-cone drill	Vertical jump	Broad jump
6 ft 0 1/4 in (1.84 m)	252 lb (114 kg)	32 3/8 in (0.82 m)	10 1/8 in (0.26 m)	6 ft 4 3/8 in (1.94 m)	4.70 s	1.61 s	2.75 s	4.65 s	7.33 s	30.0 in (0.76 m)	10 ft 2 in (3.10 m)
All values from Pro Day

On April 27, 2025, Green signed with the Jacksonville Jaguars as an undrafted free agent.

On September 16, 2026, Green was placed on injured reserve due to an elbow/forearm injury suffered in the team's season opener against the Cleveland Browns.
