= Logan Brown (American football) =

American football player (born 2001)

No. 73 – Seattle Seahawks
- Position: Offensive tackle
- Roster status: Practice squad

Personal information
- Born: April 17, 2001 (age 25); Grand Rapids, Michigan, U.S.
- Listed height: 6 ft 6 in (1.98 m)
- Listed weight: 312 lb (142 kg)

Career information
- High school: East Kentwood (Kentwood, Michigan)
- College: Wisconsin (2019–2022); Kansas (2023–2024)
- NFL draft: 2025: undrafted

Career history
- Minnesota Vikings (2025)*; Cleveland Browns (2025)*; Seattle Seahawks (2025–present)*
- * Offseason or practice squad member only

Awards and highlights
- Super Bowl champion (LX); Second-team All-Big 12 (2024)
- Stats at Pro Football Reference

Logan Brown (born April 17, 2001) is an American professional football offensive tackle for the Seattle Seahawks of the National Football League (NFL). He played college football for the Wisconsin Badgers and Kansas Jayhawks.

== Early life ==
Brown attended East Kentwood High School in Kentwood, Michigan. He was rated as a five-star recruit and held offers from schools such as Michigan, Michigan State, Penn State, and Wisconsin. Ultimately, Brown committed to play college football for the Wisconsin Badgers.

== College career ==
=== Wisconsin ===
Brown was redshirted in 2019 due to shoulder and biceps injuries. He played all seven games during the COVID-shortened 2020 season, and then played all 13 games in 2021. He made his first collegiate start in week two of the 2022 season versus Washington State. He made three starts in six games that season. However, Brown entered his name into the NCAA transfer portal in October after he was dismissed from the team by interim head coach Jim Leonhard.

=== Kansas ===
Brown transferred to play for the Kansas Jayhawks. In his first season with Kansas in 2023, he appeared in just two games playing nine snaps. Brown earned a starting spot on the Jayhawks' offensive line ahead of the 2024 season.

== Professional career ==
Pre-draft measurables
Height	Weight	Arm length	Hand span	Wingspan	40-yard dash	10-yard split	20-yard split	20-yard shuttle	Three-cone drill	Vertical jump	Broad jump	Bench press
6 ft 6 3/8 in (1.99 m)	311 lb (141 kg)	33 7/8 in (0.86 m)	10 in (0.25 m)	7 ft 0 in (2.13 m)	5.18 s	1.75 s	2.98 s	4.51 s	7.75 s	32.0 in (0.81 m)	9 ft 3 in (2.82 m)	26 reps
All values from NFL Combine

=== Minnesota Vikings ===
Brown signed with the Minnesota Vikings as an undrafted free agent on April 26, 2025. He was waived by the Vikings on August 24.

=== Cleveland Browns ===
On August 27, 2025, Brown signed with the Cleveland Browns' practice squad. He was released by Cleveland on September 16.

=== Seattle Seahawks ===
On September 29, 2025, Brown signed with the Seattle Seahawks' practice squad. He was released by the Seahawks on November 26 and re-signed to the practice squad one week later.

On February 12, 2026, Brown signed a reserve/futures contract with the Seahawks. He was waived by Seattle on August 30 as a part of final roster cuts, and re-signed a day later to the practice squad.

== Personal life ==
His sister, Jessica, played college volleyball at Western Michigan.
