= Josh Kelly (American football) =

American football player (born 2001)

No. 85 – Houston Texans
- Position: Wide receiver
- Roster status: Practice squad

Personal information
- Born: July 1, 2001 (age 25); Fresno, California, U.S.
- Listed height: 6 ft 1 in (1.85 m)
- Listed weight: 192 lb (87 kg)

Career information
- High school: San Joaquin Memorial (Fresno)
- College: Fresno State (2019–2022); Washington State (2023); Texas Tech (2024)
- NFL draft: 2025: undrafted

Career history
- Dallas Cowboys (2025)*; Houston Texans (2025–present)*
- * Offseason or practice squad member only

Awards and highlights
- Second-team All-Big 12 (2024)
- Stats at Pro Football Reference

Josh Kelly (born July 1, 2001) is an American professional football wide receiver for the Houston Texans of the National Football League (NFL). He played college football for the Fresno State Bulldogs, Washington State Cougars, and Texas Tech Red Raiders.

== Early life ==
Kelly attended San Joaquin Memorial High School in Fresno, California. He was rated as a three-star recruit and committed to play college football for the Fresno State Bulldogs.

== College career ==
=== Fresno State ===
In four years at Fresno State from 2019 to 2022, Kelly appeared in 27 games, totaling 87 receptions for 1,305 yards and four touchdowns, while also adding 28 yards and a touchdown on the ground and returning 12 punts for 225 yards. He earned all-Mountain West Conference honorable mention. After the 2022 season, Kelly entered his name into the NCAA transfer portal.

=== Washington State ===
Kelly transferred to play for the Washington State Cougars. In week 4 of the 2023 season, he hauled in eight receptions for 159 yards and three touchdowns in a win over Oregon State. In his lone season at Washington State, Kelly recorded 61 receptions for 923 yards and eight touchdowns. After the season, he entered his name into the NCAA transfer portal.

=== Texas Tech ===
Kelly transferred to play for the Texas Tech Red Raiders. In his team debut in the 2024 season opener, he brought in ten receptions for 156 yards and a touchdown in a win over Abilene Christian.

== Professional career ==
Pre-draft measurables
Height	Weight	Arm length	Hand span	Wingspan	40-yard dash	10-yard split	20-yard split	20-yard shuttle	Three-cone drill	Vertical jump	Broad jump	Bench press
6 ft 0 5/8 in (1.84 m)	186 lb (84 kg)	30 7/8 in (0.78 m)	10 1/2 in (0.27 m)	6 ft 4 5/8 in (1.95 m)	4.70 s	1.56 s	2.73 s	4.28 s	7.02 s	33.0 in (0.84 m)	10 ft 1 in (3.07 m)	8 reps
All values from NFL Combine/Pro Day

=== Dallas Cowboys ===
After going unselected in the 2025 NFL draft, Kelly signed with the Dallas Cowboys as an undrafted free agent. He was waived by the Cowboys on August 25.

=== Houston Texans ===
Kelly signed with the Houston Texans to their practice squad on August 28, 2025. On January 20, 2026, he signed a reserve/futures contract with Houston.

On August 30, 2026, Kelly was waived by the Texans as a part of final roster cuts; he was re-signed to the team's practice squad the next day.
