= Keaton Thomas =

American football player

No. 11 – Ole Miss Rebels
- Position: Linebacker
- Class: Redshirt Senior

Personal information
- Listed height: 6 ft 1 in (1.85 m)
- Listed weight: 240 lb (109 kg)

Career information
- High school: Trinity Christian (Jacksonville, Florida)
- College: West Virginia (2022); Northeast Mississippi (2023); Baylor (2024–2025); Ole Miss (2026–present)

Awards and highlights
- First-team All-Big 12 (2024); Second-team All-Big 12 (2025)
- Stats at ESPN

Keaton Thomas is an American college football linebacker for the Ole Miss Rebels. He previously played for the Northeast Mississippi Tigers and Baylor Bears.

== Early life ==
Thomas attended high school at Trinity Christian Academy located in Jacksonville, Florida. Coming out of high school, he committed to play college football for the West Virginia Mountaineers.

== College career ==
=== West Virginia ===
During his first season at West Virginia in 2022, he used the season to redshirt, where after the conclusion of the 2022 season, Thomas decided to enter his name into the NCAA transfer portal..

=== Northeast Mississippi CC ===
Thomas decided to enroll to play at Northeast Mississippi Community College. In his lone season at Northeast Mississippi CC, he totaled 107 tackles with ten being for a loss, a sack and a half, two pass deflections, and two interceptions, where for his performance he was named a first team NCJAA all-American,

=== Baylor ===
Thomas transferred to play for the Baylor Bears. During his first game as a Bear in week one of the 2024 season, Thomas intercepted a pass which he returned for a touchdown in a win over Tarleton State. He finished the 2024 season, starting in all 13 games, where he totaled 114 tackles with seven going for a loss, two and a half sacks, an interception, and a touchdown, where for his performance he was named first-team all-Big 12. Heading into the 2025 season, Thomas was named a preseason all-American, while also being named to the Butkus Award watch list and the Bronko Nagurski Award watch list.
