= Tyler Batty =

American football player (born 1999)

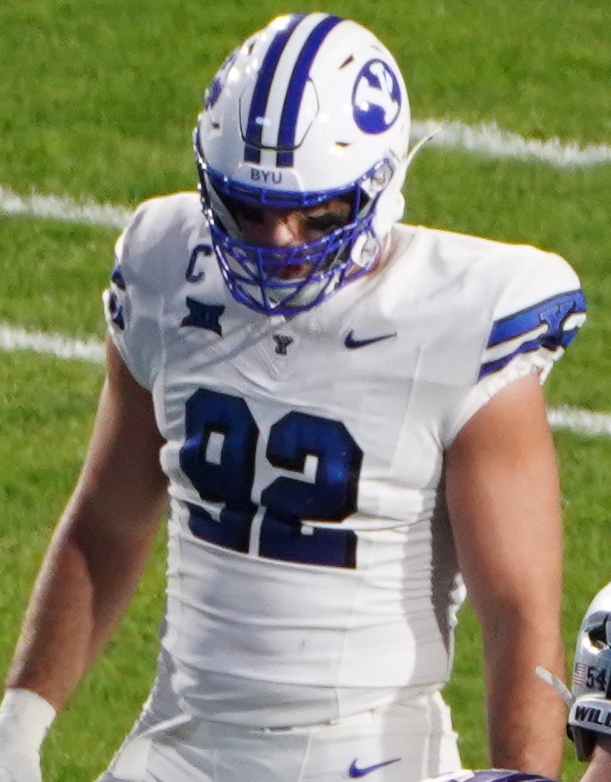
- Batty with the BYU Cougars in 2024

No. 92 – Minnesota Vikings
- Position: Outside linebacker
- Roster status: Injured reserve

Personal information
- Born: May 2, 1999 (age 27); Payson, Utah, U.S.
- Listed height: 6 ft 6 in (1.98 m)
- Listed weight: 271 lb (123 kg)

Career information
- High school: Payson (UT)
- College: BYU (2020–2024)
- NFL draft: 2025: undrafted

Career history
- Minnesota Vikings (2025–present)

Awards and highlights
- First-team All-Big 12 (2024); Second-team All-Big 12 (2023)

Career NFL statistics as of 2025
- Total tackles: 12
- Stats at Pro Football Reference

Tyler Batty (born May 2, 1999) is an American professional football outside linebacker for the Minnesota Vikings of the National Football League (NFL). He played college football for the BYU Cougars.

== Early life ==
Batty attended Payson High School in Payson, Utah, and committed to play college football for the BYU Cougars.

== College career ==
In his first three seasons from 2020 to 2022, Batty recorded 108 tackles with 17.5 being for a loss, nine and a half sacks, a fumble recovery, and a forced fumble. In week 3 of the 2023 season, he notched nine tackles with one and a half being for a loss, a sack and a half, a forced fumble, and a fumble recovery as he helped BYU beat Arkansas 38-31. For his performance, Batty was named the Big 12 Conference defensive player of the week. In the regular season finale versus Oklahoma State, he gained 36 yards on a fake punt reception. Batty finished the 2023 season notching 57 tackles with nine going for a loss, five and a half sacks, two forced fumbles, and a fumble recovery, earning second-team all-Big 12 honors.

== Professional career ==
Pre-draft measurables
Height	Weight	Arm length	Hand span	40-yard dash	10-yard split	20-yard split	20-yard shuttle	Three-cone drill	Vertical jump	Broad jump	Bench press
6 ft 5 5/8 in (1.97 m)	271 lb (123 kg)	33 1/8 in (0.84 m)	9 3/8 in (0.24 m)	4.78 s	1.69 s	2.81 s	4.54 s	7.21 s	34.0 in (0.86 m)	10 ft 0 in (3.05 m)	27 reps
All values from NFL Combine

Batty signed with the Minnesota Vikings as an undrafted free agent on April 26, 2025. He began the regular season on injured reserve due to a knee injury suffered in the preseason. Batty was activated on October 19, and made his NFL debut against the Philadelphia Eagles; the Vikings had him lie down sideways in front of Eagles center Cam Jurgens prior to the snap in an attempt to thwart Philadelphia's controversial Tush Push.

On August 30, 2026, Batty was placed on season-ending injured reserve due to a torn ACL suffered in the team's preseason matchup against the Denver Broncos.

== Personal life ==
Batty is a member of the Church of Jesus Christ of Latter-day Saints and served a church mission in Spain.
