= Collin Oliver =

American football player (born 2002)

No. 45 – Green Bay Packers
- Position: Outside linebacker
- Roster status: Injured reserve/designated for return

Personal information
- Born: September 23, 2002 (age 24); Oklahoma City, Oklahoma, U.S.
- Listed height: 6 ft 2 in (1.88 m)
- Listed weight: 240 lb (109 kg)

Career information
- High school: Edmond Santa Fe (Edmond, Oklahoma)
- College: Oklahoma State (2021–2024)
- NFL draft: 2025: 5th round, 159th overall pick

Career history
- Green Bay Packers (2025–present)

Awards and highlights
- 3× Second-team All-Big 12 (2021, 2022, 2023); Big 12 Defensive Freshman of the Year (2021)

Career NFL statistics as of 2025
- Total tackles: 1
- Stats at Pro Football Reference

Collin Oliver (born September 23, 2002) is an American professional football outside linebacker for the Green Bay Packers of the National Football League (NFL). He played college football for the Oklahoma State Cowboys and was selected by the Packers in the fifth round of the 2025 NFL draft.

== Early life ==
Oliver grew up in Oklahoma City, Oklahoma and attended Edmond Santa Fe High School. He had 66 tackles with 17 tackles for loss, four sacks as a senior. Oliver was rated a four-star recruit and committed to play college football at Oklahoma State over offers from Georgia, Arkansas, Oregon, and Oklahoma.

== College career ==
Oliver was named a starter at defensive end going into his freshman season at Oklahoma State. Oliver was named the Big 12 Conference Defensive Freshman of the Year and second team All-Big 12 after finishing the season with 29 tackles, 15.5 tackles for loss, and 11.5 sacks, including the winning sack to win the 2021 edition of the Bedlam Rivalry against a top 10 Oklahoma Sooners team. He entered his sophomore season on the watchlist for the Bronko Nagurski Trophy.

== Professional career ==
Pre-draft measurables
Height	Weight	Arm length	Hand span	Wingspan	40-yard dash	10-yard split	20-yard split	Vertical jump	Broad jump	Bench press
6 ft 1 3/4 in (1.87 m)	240 lb (109 kg)	30 3/4 in (0.78 m)	9 1/2 in (0.24 m)	6 ft 4 1/8 in (1.93 m)	4.56 s	1.57 s	2.66 s	39.0 in (0.99 m)	10 ft 6 in (3.20 m)	24 reps
All values from NFL Combine/Pro Day

Oliver was selected by the Green Bay Packers with the 159th overall pick in the fifth round of the 2025 NFL draft. On May 2, 2025, he signed his rookie contract with the Packers. On August 26, he was placed on reserve/physically unable to perform list. Oliver was activated on December 22, ahead of the team's Week 17 matchup against the Baltimore Ravens.

Oliver began the 2026 season on injured reserve with a calf injury.

== NFL career statistics ==
=== Regular season ===
Year	Team	Games		Tackles					Interceptions						Fumbles	
Year	Team	GP	GS	Cmb	Solo	Ast	Sck	Sfty	PD	Int	Yds	Avg	Lng	TD	FF	FR
2025	GB	1	0	1	1	0	0.0	0	0	0	0	0.0	0	0	0	0
Total		1	0	1	1	0	0.0	0	0	0	0	0.0	0	0	0	0
Source: pro-football-reference.com
