= C. J. Fite =

American football player (born 2005)

No. 99 – Arizona State Sun Devils
- Position: Defensive tackle
- Class: Senior

Personal information
- Born: May 27, 2005 (age 21)
- Listed height: 6 ft 2 in (1.88 m)
- Listed weight: 305 lb (138 kg)

Career information
- High school: Tatum (Tatum, Texas)
- College: Arizona State (2023–present)

Awards and highlights
- Second-team All-Big 12 (2024)
- Stats at ESPN

Cullen "C. J." Fite (born May 27, 2005) is an American college football defensive tackle for the Arizona State Sun Devils.

== Early life ==
Fite attended Tatum High School in Tatum, Texas. He committed to play college football for the Arizona State Sun Devils.

== College career ==
As a freshman in 2023, Fite appeared in all 12 games with six starts, where he recorded 15 tackles, a pass deflection, and a fumble recovery. In week 2 of the 2024 season, he recovered a fumble which he returned for a touchdown, in a victory versus Mississippi State. Fite started all 14 games on the season, totaling 30 tackles with four being for a loss, and two sacks. He earned second-team all-Big 12 honors.

== Personal life ==
Fite is the son of former Texas State defensive end Drenon Fite Jr. and Texas State volleyball player Tamara Fite, while his sister Madison Fite also played volleyball at Texas State.
