= Jakob Robinson =

American football player (born 2000)

No. 39 – Tennessee Titans
- Position: Cornerback
- Roster status: Practice squad

Personal information
- Born: October 10, 2000 (age 26); Orem, Utah, U.S.
- Listed height: 5 ft 10 in (1.78 m)
- Listed weight: 181 lb (82 kg)

Career information
- High school: Orem (UT)
- College: Utah State (2020); BYU (2021–2024)
- NFL draft: 2025: undrafted

Career history
- San Francisco 49ers (2025–2026); Tennessee Titans (2026–present)*
- * Offseason or practice squad member only

Awards and highlights
- Second-team All-Big 12 (2024)
- Stats at Pro Football Reference

Jakob Robinson (born October 10, 2000) is an American professional football cornerback for the Tennessee Titans of the National Football League (NFL). He played college football for the Utah State Aggies and BYU Cougars.

== Early life ==
Robinson is of African American and Vietnamese heritage and was adopted at birth by a Mormon family from Utah. His Vietnamese birth mother, who now lives in Miami, was also an adoptee. Robinson attended Orem High School in Orem, Utah. He participated in the basketball and track and field teams. In football, he was a part of a team that won three consecutive state championships. He was rated as a three-star recruit, the 20th in the state, and committed to play college football for the Utah State Aggies.

== College career ==
=== Utah State ===
As a freshman in 2020, Robinson notched eight tackles and a sack. After the season, he entered his name into the NCAA transfer portal.

=== BYU ===
Robinson transferred to play for the BYU Cougars. In week 13 of the 2021 season, he tallied two interceptions in a win over Georgia Southern. Robinson finished the season with 29 tackles, four pass deflections, and three interceptions. In the 2022 New Mexico Bowl, he made the game-winning tackle on a two-point conversion attempt by quarterback Tanner Mordecai, helping BYU to a 24–23 win over SMU. During the 2022 season, Robinson recorded 51 tackles with one and a half being for a loss, five pass deflections, and an interception. In week 2 of the 2023 season, he was a captain, and notched two interceptions in a win over Sam Houston State. Robinson finished the 2023 season with 59 tackles, seven pass deflections, four interceptions, and a touchdown, finishing as a semifinalist for the Jim Thorpe Award.

== Professional career ==
Pre-draft measurables
Height	Weight	Arm length	Hand span	Wingspan	40-yard dash	10-yard split	20-yard split	20-yard shuttle	Three-cone drill	Vertical jump	Broad jump
5 ft 10 1/4 in (1.78 m)	181 lb (82 kg)	30 1/4 in (0.77 m)	9 in (0.23 m)	6 ft 2 3/4 in (1.90 m)	4.39 s	1.55 s	2.54 s	4.38 s	7.01 s	38.5 in (0.98 m)	10 ft 5 in (3.18 m)
All values from Pro Day

=== San Francisco 49ers ===
Robinson was not invited to the NFL Combine and was not selected in the 2025 NFL draft. On April 26, he signed an undrafted free agent contract with the San Francisco 49ers.

On August 30, 2026, Robinson was waived by the 49ers as a part of final roster cuts and re-signed to the practice squad the next day. He was released by San Francisco on September 23.

=== Tennessee Titans ===
On September 29, 2026, Robinson signed with the Tennessee Titans practice squad.
