= Malik Verdon =

American football player (born 2002)

Profile
- Position: Linebacker

Personal information
- Born: October 31, 2002 (age 24)
- Listed height: 6 ft 4 in (1.93 m)
- Listed weight: 218 lb (99 kg)

Career information
- High school: Lakota West (Cincinnati, Ohio); Moeller (Cincinnati); Hamilton (Hamilton, Ohio)
- College: Iowa State (2021–2024)
- NFL draft: 2025: undrafted

Career history
- Atlanta Falcons (2025–2026)*
- * Offseason or practice squad member only

Awards and highlights
- Second-team All-Big 12 (2024)
- Stats at Pro Football Reference

Malik Verdon (born October 31, 2002) is an American professional football linebacker. He played college football for the Iowa State Cyclones.

== Early life ==
Verdon was born on October 31, 2002. He attended three high schools but graduated from Hamilton High School in Hamilton, Ohio. At defensive back, Verdon garnered First Team All-Greater Miami Conference honors. He was a three-star prospect out of high school and committed to play college football at Iowa State.

== College career ==
Verdon played college football for the Iowa State Cyclones from 2021 to 2024. He played in 27 games making 134 tackles, including seven tackles for loss, one sack, three interceptions, seven pass deflections and two forced fumbles. In 2024, Verdon was named to the second-team All-Big 12 team, after finishing second on the team in tackles with 76. Following this, he declared for the NFL draft.

== Professional career ==
Pre-draft measurables
Height	Weight	Arm length	Hand span	Wingspan	20-yard shuttle	Three-cone drill	Vertical jump	Broad jump
6 ft 3 5/8 in (1.92 m)	218 lb (99 kg)	32 1/2 in (0.83 m)	9 1/2 in (0.24 m)	6 ft 6 3/8 in (1.99 m)	4.20 s	7.06 s	37.5 in (0.95 m)	10 ft 0 in (3.05 m)
All values from NFL Combine/Pro Day

After not being selected in the 2025 NFL draft, Verdon signed with the Atlanta Falcons as an undrafted free agent. He was placed on the Non-Football Injury list on July 24, 2025. On December 4, it was reported that Verdon would miss the entirety of his rookie season following the expiration of his practice window.

On August 11, 2026, Verdon was waived by the Falcons and reverted to injured reserve the next day. He was released by the Falcons on September 11.
