= Jeremiah Cooper =

American football player (born 2004)

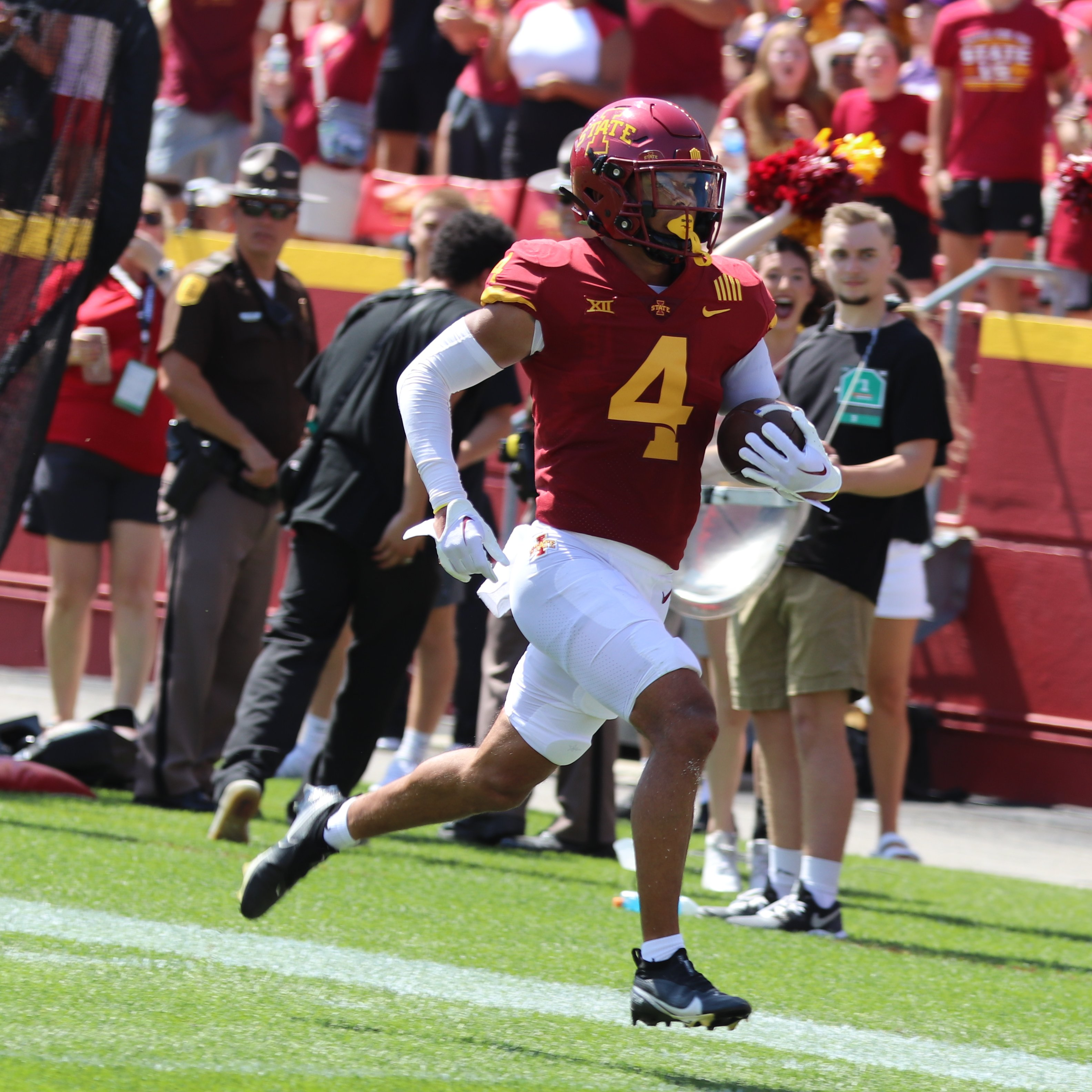

No. 4 – Penn State Nittany Lions
- Position: Defensive back
- Class: Redshirt Senior

Personal information
- Born: April 26, 2004 (age 22)
- Listed height: 6 ft 0 in (1.83 m)
- Listed weight: 184 lb (83 kg)

Career information
- High school: Andress (El Paso, Texas)
- College: Iowa State (2022–2025); Penn State (2026–present)

Awards and highlights
- First-team All-Big 12 (2023)
- Stats at ESPN

Jeremiah Cooper (born April 26, 2004) is an American college football defensive back for the Penn State Nittany Lions. He previously played for the Iowa State Cyclones.

== Early life ==
Cooper attended Andress High School in El Paso, Texas, where he played both wide receiver and a safety on the football team. Offensively, he hauled in 78 receptions for 1,493 yards and 17 touchdowns and rushed for 782 yards and two touchdowns. Defensively, he notched 143 tackles with seven being for a loss, a sack, 13 pass deflections, 19 interceptions, three fumble recoveries, and three forced fumbles. Cooper committed to play college football at Iowa State University.

== College career ==
As a freshman in 2022, Cooper totaled 32 tackles with half a tack being for a loss, and a pass deflection. In the 2023 season opener, he intercepted two passes, returning one for a touchdown, in a win over Northern Iowa. For his performance, Cooper was named the Big 12 Conference defensive player of the week. The following week, Cooper recorded an interception against rival Iowa. In week 7, Cooper grabbed another interception against Cincinnati to increase his NCAA interception lead to five on the year.

At the conclusion of the 2025 season, Cooper announced his intent to enter the transfer portal. On January 11, 2026, he committed to the Penn State Nittany Lions, following his Iowa State head coach Matt Campbell to the school.

=== Statistics ===
Year	Team	Games		Tackles				Fumbles				Interceptions			
Year	Team	GP	GS	Cmb	Solo	Ast	Sck	FF	FR	Yds	TD	Int	Yds	TD	PD
2022	Iowa State	9	7	32	19	13	0.0	0	0	0	0	0	0	0	1
2023	Iowa State	11	11	45	27	18	0.0	1	0	0	0	5	88	1	10
2024	Iowa State	14	14	48	30	18	0.0	0	0	0	0	2	6	0	8
2025	Iowa State	3	3	7	4	3	0.0	0	0	0	0	1	24	0	2
Career		37	35	132	80	52	0.0	1	0	0	0	8	118	1	21

== Personal life ==
His brother Tristan played football at Arizona while his sister Hannah plays basketball at Oral Roberts.
