= 2024 Frisco Bowl =

Postseason college football bowl game

2024 Scooter's Coffee Frisco Bowl
- 7th Frisco Bowl
Memphis Tigers	West Virginia Mountaineers
(10–2)	(6–6)
The American	Big 12
42	37
Head coach: Ryan Silverfield	Head coach: Chad Scott (interim)
AP / Coaches / CFP; 25 / 23 / 25
	1	2	3	4	Total
Memphis	7	21	7	7	42
West Virginia	0	17	6	14	37
- Date: December 17, 2024
- Season: 2024
- Stadium: Toyota Stadium
- Location: Frisco, Texas
- MVP: Off.: Seth Henigan (QB, Memphis); Def.: Chandler Martin (LB, Memphis)
- Favorite: West Virginia by 3.5
- Referee: Jeremy Parker (Sun Belt)
- Attendance: 12,022

United States TV coverage
- Network: ESPN
- Announcers: Mike Monaco (play-by-play), Kirk Morrison (analyst), and Dawn Davenport (sideline)

The 2024 Frisco Bowl was a college football bowl game that was played on December 17, 2024, at Toyota Stadium located in Frisco, Texas. The seventh annual Frisco Bowl featured West Virginia and Memphis. The game began at approximately 8:00 p.m. CST and aired on ESPN. The Frisco Bowl was one of the 2024–25 bowl games concluding the 2024 FBS football season. The game was sponsored by coffeehouse chain Scooter's Coffee and was officially known as the 2024 Scooter's Coffee Frisco Bowl.

== Teams ==
The game featured the Memphis Tigers from the American Athletic Conference ("The American") and the West Virginia Mountaineers from the Big 12 Conference. This was the first matchup between these two teams.

=== West Virginia Mountaineers ===
West Virginia finished their regular season with an overall 6–6 record (5–4 in conference). The Mountaineers faced and lost to three ranked Football Bowl Subdivision (FBS) teams: Penn State, Iowa State, and Kansas State. West Virginia's interim head coach for the bowl game was offensive coordinator Chad Scott, as Neal Brown was dismissed following the team's final regular-season game, a 52–15 loss to Texas Tech.

=== Memphis Tigers ===
Memphis finished their regular season with an overall 10–2 record (6–2 in conference). Their only losses were to Navy and UTSA. The Tigers faced and defeated one ranked opponent, Tulane, in their final regular-season game. Memphis entered the Frisco Bowl ranked 25th in both the AP poll and in the final College Football Playoff (CFP) rankings.

== Game summary ==
2024 Frisco Bowl

Quarter	1	2	3	4	Total
No. 25 Memphis	7	21	7	7	42
West Virginia	0	17	6	14	37

at Toyota Stadium • Frisco, Texas

- Date: Tuesday, December 17, 2024
- Game time: 8:13 p.m. CST / 9:13 p.m. EST
- Game weather: Cloudy • Temperature: 69 °F (21 °C) • Wind: 9 mph (14 km/h) southeast
- Game attendance: 12,022
- Referee: Jeremy Parker
- TV announcers (ESPN): Mike Monaco (play-by-play), Kirk Morrison (analyst), and Dawn Davenport (sideline)
- Box score

Game information

First Quarter

- (5:06) MEM – Mario Anderson Jr. 4 yard pass from Seth Henigan, Tristian Vandenburg kick (Drive: 5 plays, 45 yards, 2:50; Memphis 7–0)

Second Quarter

- (14:56) MEM – Tristian Vandenburg 34 yard field goal (Drive: 7 plays, 25 yards, 2:48; Memphis 10–0)
- (10:46) MEM – Greg Desrosiers Jr. 46 yard run, Tristian Vandenburg kick (Drive: 1 play, 46 yards, 0:10; Memphis 17–0)
- (7:28) WVU – Hudson Clement 33 yard pass from Garrett Greene, Michael Hayes II kick (Drive: 6 plays, 75 yards, 3:18; Memphis 17–7)
- (2:30) MEM – Tristian Vandenburg 42 yard field goal (Drive: 11 plays, 51 yards, 4:58; Memphis 20–7)
- (1:44) WVU – Garrett Greene 56 yard run, Michael Hayes II kick (Drive: 4 plays, 75 yards, 0:46; Memphis 20–14)
- (0:55) MEM – Demeer Blankumsee 18 yard pass from Seth Henigan, Demeer Blankumsee pass from Seth Henigan for 2-pt conversion (Drive: 5 plays, 75 yards, 0:47; Memphis 28–14)
- (0:00) WVU – Michael Hayes II 46 yard field goal (Drive: 7 plays, 47 yards, 0:55; Memphis 28–17)

Third Quarter

- (11:10) MEM – Mario Anderson Jr. 3 yard run, Tristian Vandenburg kick (Drive: 8 plays, 75 yards, 3:50; Memphis 35–17)
- (7:15) WVU – Hudson Clement 10 yard pass from Garrett Greene, 2-pt conversion failed (Drive: 10 plays, 75 yards, 3:55; Memphis 35–23)

Fourth Quarter

- (12:02) WVU – CJ Donaldson Jr. 1 yard run, Michael Hayes II kick (Drive: 16 plays, 90 yards, 7:51; Memphis 35–30)
- (10:49) MEM – Brandon Thomas 1 yard run, Tristian Vandenburg kick (Drive: 2 plays, 90 yards, 1:05; Memphis 42–30)
- (4:17) WVU – CJ Donaldson Jr. 1 yard run, Michael Hayes II kick (Drive: 12 plays, 75 yards, 6:32; Memphis 42–37)

=== Statistics ===
Statistics	MEM	WVU
First downs	18	25
Plays–yards	56–474	76–534
Rushes–yards	30–180	36–206
Passing yards	294	328
Passing: comp–att–int	18–26–0	29–40–1
Time of possession	26:20	33:40

Team	Category	Player	Statistics
Memphis	Passing	Seth Henigan	18/26, 294 yards, 2 TD
Memphis	Rushing	Mario Anderson	17 carries, 70 yards, TD
Memphis	Receiving	DeMeer Blankumsee	4 receptions, 120 yards, TD
West Virginia	Passing	Garrett Greene	29/40, 328 yards, 2 TD, INT
West Virginia	Rushing	Garrett Greene	7 carries, 95 yards, TD
West Virginia	Receiving	Hudson Clement	11 receptions, 166 yards, 2 TD
