= 2024 Memphis Tigers football team =

American college football season

2024 Memphis Tigers football

Frisco Bowl champion

Frisco Bowl, W 42–37 vs. West Virginia
- Conference: American Athletic Conference

Ranking
- Coaches: No. 23
- AP: No. 24
- Record: 11–2 (6–2 American)
- Head coach: Ryan Silverfield (5th season)
- Offensive coordinator: Tim Cramsey (3rd season)
- Co-offensive coordinator: Larry Smith (1st season)
- Offensive scheme: Pro spread
- Defensive coordinator: Jordon Hankins (1st season)
- Co-defensive coordinator: Spence Nowinsky (1st season)
- Base defense: 4–3
- Home stadium: Simmons Bank Liberty Stadium

2024 American Athletic Conference football standings
	Conf.			Overall
Team	W		L	W		L
No. 21 Army y$	8	–	0	12	–	2
Tulane y	7	–	1	9	–	5
Navy	6	–	2	10	–	3
No. 24 Memphis	6	–	2	11	–	2
East Carolina	5	–	3	8	–	5
South Florida	4	–	4	7	–	6
UTSA	4	–	4	7	–	6
Charlotte	4	–	4	5	–	7
North Texas	3	–	5	6	–	7
Rice	3	–	5	4	–	8
Temple	2	–	6	3	–	9
UAB	2	–	6	3	–	9
Florida Atlantic	1	–	7	3	–	9
Tulsa	1	–	7	3	–	9
Championship: Army 35, Tulane 14
$ – Conference champion; y – Championship game participant; Rankings from AP Poll

The 2024 Memphis Tigers football team represented the University of Memphis in the American Athletic Conference (AAC) during the 2024 NCAA Division I FBS football season. The Tigers were led by Ryan Silverfield in his fifth year as the head coach. The Tigers played their home games at Simmons Bank Liberty Stadium, located in Memphis, Tennessee.

== Preseason ==
=== AAC media poll ===
The American Athletic Conference released its media prediction poll on July 23, 2024. The Tigers were predicted to finish first in the conference.

== Schedule ==
Date	Time	Opponent	Rank	Site	TV	Result	Attendance
August 31	6:00 p.m.	North Alabama*		Simmons Bank Liberty Stadium; Memphis, TN	ESPN+	W 40–0	25,849
September 7	11:00 a.m.	Troy*		Simmons Bank Liberty Stadium; Memphis, TN	ESPNU	W 38–17	23,246
September 14	11:00 a.m.	at Florida State*		Doak Campbell Stadium; Tallahassee, FL	ESPN	W 20–12	55,107
September 21	2:30 p.m.	at Navy		Navy–Marine Corps Memorial Stadium; Annapolis, MD	CBSSN	L 44–56	31,268
September 28	6:30 p.m.	Middle Tennessee*		Simmons Bank Liberty Stadium; Memphis, TN	ESPNU	W 24–7	25,266
October 12	2:30 p.m.	at South Florida		Camping World Stadium; Orlando, FL	ESPN+	W 21–3	3,365
October 19	6:30 p.m.	North Texas		Simmons Bank Liberty Stadium; Memphis, TN	ESPNU	W 52–44	24,110
October 26	11:00 a.m.	Charlotte^{†}		Simmons Bank Liberty Stadium; Memphis, TN	ESPNU	W 33–28	25,478
November 2	11:00 a.m.	at UTSA		Alamodome; San Antonio, TX	ESPN2	L 36–44	17,198
November 8	8:00 p.m.	Rice		Simmons Bank Liberty Stadium; Memphis, TN	ESPN2	W 27–20	23,692
November 16	7:00 p.m.	UAB		Simmons Bank Liberty Stadium; Memphis, TN (Battle for the Bones)	ESPN2	W 53–18	24,225
November 28	6:30 p.m.	at No. 17 Tulane		Yulman Stadium; New Orleans, LA	ESPN	W 34–24	25,021
December 17	8:00 p.m.	vs. West Virginia*	No. 25	Toyota Stadium; Frisco, TX (Frisco Bowl)	ESPN	W 42–37	12,022
*Non-conference game; ^{†}Homecoming; Rankings from AP Poll (and CFP Rankings, after November 5) - Released prior to game; All times are in Central time

== Game summaries ==
=== North Alabama (FCS) ===
North Alabama Lions (FCS) (0–1) at Memphis Tigers (0–0) – Game summary

Quarter	1	2	3	4	Total
Lions (FCS)	0	0	0	0	0
Tigers	7	24	3	6	40

at Simmons Bank Liberty Stadium • Memphis, Tennessee

- Date: August 31st
- Game time: 6:00 p.m. CDT
- Game weather: Cloudy • Temperature: 89 °F (32 °C) • Wind: SE at 5 miles per hour (8.0 km/h)
- Game attendance: 25,849
- Referee: Steven Anderson
- TV announcers (ESPN+): James Westling (play-by-play) and Leger Douzable (analyst)

Game information

First quarter

- (10:05) MEM – Mario Anderson 4 yard run, Caden Costa kick (Drive: 10 plays, 70 yards, 4:48; Memphis 7–0)

Second quarter

- (14:56) MEM – Anthony Landphere 2 yard pass from Seth Henigan, Caden Costa kick (Drive: 9 plays, 52 yards, 3:56; Memphis 14–0)
- (8:11) MEM – Brendan Doyle 32 yard pass from Seth Henigan, Caden Costa kick (Drive: 3 plays, 54 yards, 1:37; Memphis 21–0)
- (5:20) MEM – Mario Anderson 5 yard run, Caden Costa kick (Drive: 3 plays, 26 yards, 1:20; Memphis 28–0)
- (0:34) MEM – Caden Costa 38 yard field goal (Drive: 8 plays, 35 yards, 2:31; Memphis 31–0)

Third quarter

- (1:25) MEM – Caden Costa 21 yard field goal (Drive: 7 plays, 59 yards, 3:35; Memphis 34–0)

Fourth quarter

- (12:29) MEM – Greg Desrosiers Jr. 5 yard run, kick failed (Drive: 4 plays, 63 yards, 2:20; Memphis 40–0)

Statistics	UNA	MEM
First downs	11	17
Plays–yards	59–185	56–367
Rushes–yards	31–67	26–59
Passing yards	118	308
Passing: Comp–Att–Int	17–28–2	22–30–0
Time of possession	32:44	27:16

Team	Category	Player	Statistics
North Alabama	Passing	Ari Patu	15/26, 103 yards, 2 INT
North Alabama	Rushing	Dennis Moody	13 carries, 39 yards
North Alabama	Receiving	Kobe Warden	3 receptions, 34 yards
Memphis	Passing	Seth Henigan	22/30, 308 yards, 2 TD
Memphis	Rushing	Mario Anderson	10 carries, 46 yards, 2 TD
Memphis	Receiving	Roc Taylor	5 receptions, 87 yards

=== Troy ===
Troy Trojans (0–1) at Memphis Tigers (1–0) – Game summary

Quarter	1	2	3	4	Total
Trojans	0	7	3	7	17
Tigers	7	14	10	7	38

at Simmons Bank Liberty Stadium • Memphis, Tennessee

- Date: September 7th
- Game time: 11:00 a.m. CDT
- Game weather: Sunny • Temperature: 72 °F (22 °C) • Wind: NE at 15 miles per hour (24 km/h)
- Game attendance: 23,246
- Referee: Ted Pitts
- TV announcers (ESPNU): Mike Corey (play-by-play) and Rene Ingoglia (analyst)

Game information

First quarter

- (8:35) MEM – Brandon Thomas 2 yard run, Caden Costa kick (Drive: 14 plays, 70 yards, 5:32; Memphis 7–0)

Second quarter

- (12:51) TROY – Goose Crowder 11 yard run, Scott Taylor Renfroe kick (Drive: 13 plays, 75 yards, 7:00; Tied 7–7)
- (7:35) MEM – Brandon Thomas 1 yard run, Caden Costa kick (Drive: 12 plays, 75 yards, 5:16; Memphis 14–7)
- (3:07) MEM – Mario Anderson 21 yard run, Caden Costa kick (Drive: 2 plays, 50 yards, 0:51; Memphis 21–7)

Third quarter

- (10:16) MEM – Caden Costa 32 yard field goal (Drive: 6 plays, 17 yards, 3:14; Memphis 24–7)
- (5:32) MEM – Brendan Doyle 4 yard pass from Seth Henigan, Caden Costa kick (Drive: 6 plays, 69 yards, 2:43; Memphis 31–7)
- (0:29) TROY – Scott Taylor Renfroe 22 yard field goal (Drive: 10 plays, 71 yards, 5:03; Memphis 31–10)

Fourth quarter

- (13:03) MEM – Mario Anderson 4 yard run, Caden Costa kick (Drive: 7 plays, 75 yards, 2:06; Memphis 38–10)
- (6:47) TROY – Matthew Caldwell 1 yard run, Scott Taylor Renfroe kick (Drive: 14 plays, 75 yards, 6:16; Memphis 38–17)

Statistics	TROY	MEM
First downs	17	27
Plays–yards	60–251	61–372
Rushes–yards	34–101	29–211
Passing yards	150	161
Passing: Comp–Att–Int	16–26–0	20–32–0
Time of possession	31:06	28:54

Team	Category	Player	Statistics
Troy	Passing	Matthew Caldwell	11/19, 113 yards
Troy	Rushing	Damien Taylor	7 carries, 33 yards
Troy	Receiving	Zeriah Beason	4 receptions, 60 yards
Memphis	Passing	Seth Henigan	20/32, 161 yards, TD
Memphis	Rushing	Mario Anderson	17 carries, 125 yards, 2 TD
Memphis	Receiving	DeMeer Blankumsee	4 receptions, 50 yards

=== at Florida State ===
Memphis Tigers (2–0) at Florida State Seminoles (0–2) – Game summary

Quarter	1	2	3	4	Total
Tigers	3	10	7	0	20
Seminoles	0	3	6	3	12

at Doak Campbell Stadium • Tallahassee, Florida

- Date: September 14th
- Game time: 11:00 a.m. CDT
- Game weather: Cloudy • Temperature: 82 °F (28 °C) • Wind: SE at 8 miles per hour (13 km/h)
- Game attendance: 55,107
- Referee: Justin Elliott
- TV announcers (ESPN): Bob Wischusen (play-by-play), Louis Riddick (analyst), and Kris Budden (sideline reporter)

Game information

First quarter

- (11:49) MEM – Caden Costa 35 yard field goal (Drive: 7 plays, 8 yards, 2:37; Memphis 3–0)

Second quarter

- (10:16) MEM – Greg Desrosiers Jr. 6 yard pass from Seth Henigan, Caden Costa kick (Drive: 8 plays, 65 yards, 4:53; Memphis 10–0)
- (2:26) FSU – Ryan Fitzgerald 54 yard field goal (Drive: 8 plays, 15 yards, 2:15; Memphis 10–3)
- (0:00) MEM – Caden Costa 19 yard field goal (Drive: 9 plays, 27 yards, 1:59; Memphis 13–3)

Third quarter

- (8:27) MEM – Anthony Landphere 2 yard pass from Seth Henigan, Caden Costa kick (Drive: 11 plays, 75 yards, 6:33; Memphis 20–3)
- (7:05) FSU – Roydell Williams 4 yard run, 2-point run failed (Drive: 3 plays, 75 yards, 1:22; Memphis 20–9)

Fourth quarter

- (8:07) FSU – Ryan Fitzgerald 35 yard field goal (Drive: 16 plays, 71 yards, 8:35; Memphis 20–12)

Statistics	MEM	FSU
First downs	19	11
Plays–yards	71–337	55–238
Rushes–yards	32–65	24–37
Passing yards	272	201
Passing: Comp–Att–Int	25–39–1	16–31–1
Time of possession	36:21	23:39

Team	Category	Player	Statistics
Memphis	Passing	Seth Henigan	25/38, 272 yards, 2 TD, 1 INT
Memphis	Rushing	Mario Anderson	14 carries, 32 yards
Memphis	Receiving	Anthony Landphere	5 receptions, 66 yards, 1 TD
Florida State	Passing	DJ Uiagalelei	16/30, 201 yards, 1 INT
Florida State	Rushing	Lawrance Toafili	4 carries, 30 yards
Florida State	Receiving	Malik Benson	5 receptions, 99 yards

=== at Navy ===
Memphis Tigers (3–0) at Navy Midshipmen (2–0) – Game summary

Quarter	1	2	3	4	Total
Tigers	14	3	13	14	44
Midshipmen	7	21	7	21	56

at Navy–Marine Corps Memorial Stadium • Annapolis, Maryland

- Date: September 21st
- Game time: 2:30 p.m. CDT
- Game weather: Sunny • Temperature: 78 °F (26 °C) • Wind: SE at 9 miles per hour (14 km/h)
- Game attendance: 31,268
- Referee: Kevin Randall
- TV announcers (CBSSN): Carter Blackburn (play-by-play), Randy Cross (analyst), and Sheehan Stanwick-Burch (sideline reporter)

Game information

First quarter

- (11:13) MEM – Mario Anderson Jr. 7-yard run, Caden Costa kick (Drive: 9 plays, 65 yards, 3:47; Memphis 7–0)
- (3:11) NAVY – Blake Horvath 5-yard run, Nathan Kirkwood kick (Drive: 10 plays, 77 yards, 5:01; Tied 7–7)
- (1:21) MEM – Brandon Thomas 57-yard run, Caden Costa kick (Drive: 4 plays, 75 yards, 1:50; Memphis 14–7)

Second quarter

- (14:54) NAVY – Eli Heidenreich 39-yard pass from Blake Horvath, Nathan Kirkwood kick (Drive: 4 plays, 75 yards, 1:27; Tied 14–14)
- (9:37) NAVY – Brandon Chatman 12-yard run, Nathan Kirkwood kick (Drive: 7 plays, 52 yards, 3:37; Navy 21–14)
- (2:14) MEM – Caden Costa 29-yard field goal (Drive: 15 plays, 64 yards, 7:23; Navy 21–17)
- (0:11) NAVY – Blake Horvath 3-yard run, Nathan Kirkwood kick (Drive: 9 plays, 75 yards, 2:03; Navy 28–17)

Third quarter

- (12:24) NAVY – Brandon Chatman 46-yard pass from Blake Horvath, Nathan Kirkwood kick (Drive: 5 plays, 75 yards, 2:36; Navy 35–17)
- (10:37) MEM – Roc Taylor 37-yard pass from Seth Henigan, Caden Costa kick (Drive: 5 plays, 72 yards, 1:47; Navy 35–24)
- (1:11) MEM – Mario Anderson Jr. 5-yard run (Drive: 12 plays, 95 yards, 5:28; Navy 35–30)

Fourth quarter

- (14:56) NAVY – Blake Horvath 7-yard run, Nathan Kirkwood kick (Drive: 4 plays, 75 yards, 1:15; Navy 42–30)
- (8:22) NAVY – Blake Horvath 90-yard run, Nathan Kirkwood kick (Drive: 1 play, 90 yards, 0:14; Navy 49–30)
- (6:49) MEM – Marcello Bussey 36-yard pass from Seth Henigan, Koby Drake pass (Drive: 6 plays, 80 yards, 1:25; Navy 49–38)
- (1:22) MEM – Mario Anderson Jr. 1-yard run (Drive: 13 plays, 80 yards, 3:03; Navy 49–44)
- (0:23) NAVY – Rayuan Lane 86-yard interception, Nathan Kirkwood kick (Navy 56–44)

Statistics	MEM	NAVY
First downs	32	21
Plays–yards	95–659	53–566
Rushes–yards	38–274	39–361
Passing yards	385	205
Passing: Comp–Att–Int	33–57–1	10–14–0
Time of possession	35:55	24:05

Team	Category	Player	Statistics
Memphis	Passing	Seth Henigan	32/56, 371 yards, 2 TD, INT
Memphis	Rushing	Brandon Thomas	12 carries, 125 yards, TD
Memphis	Receiving	Kobe Drake	9 receptions, 102 yards
Navy	Passing	Blake Horvath	9/12, 192 yards, 2 TD
Navy	Rushing	Blake Horvath	12 carries, 211 yards, 4 TD
Navy	Receiving	Brandon Chatman	3 receptions, 81 yards, TD

=== Middle Tennessee ===
Middle Tennessee Blue Raiders (1–3) at Memphis Tigers (3–1) – Game summary

Quarter	1	2	3	4	Total
Blue Raiders	0	0	7	0	7
Tigers	0	14	10	0	24

at Simmons Bank Liberty Stadium • Memphis, Tennessee

- Date: September 28th
- Game time: 6:30 p.m. CDT
- Game weather: Rain • Temperature: 67 °F (19 °C) • Wind: NW at 2 miles per hour (3.2 km/h)
- Game attendance: 25,266
- Referee: Edwin Lee
- TV announcers (ESPNU): Courtney Lyle (play-by-play) and Rene Ingoglia (analyst)

Game information

First quarter

No scoring plays

Second quarter

- (13:41) MEM – Brandon Thomas 2-yard run, Caden Costa kick (Drive: 3 plays, 12 yards, 1:02; Memphis 7–0)
- (5:53) MEM – Mario Anderson Jr. 4-yard run, Caden Costa kick (Drive: 13 plays, 70 yards, 5:47; Memphis 14–0)

Third quarter

- (10:45) MTSU – Terry Wilkins 5-yard run, Zeke Rankin kick (Drive: 8 plays, 75 yards, 4:15; Memphis 14–7)
- (7:13) MEM – Brandon Thomas 1-yard run, Caden Costa kick (Drive: 7 plays, 50 yards, 3:23; Memphis 21–7)
- (1:21) MEM – Caden Costa 47-yard field goal (Drive: 6 plays, 44 yards, 2:10; Memphis 24–7)

Fourth quarter

No scoring plays

Statistics	MTSU	MEM
First downs	13	22
Plays–yards	56–312	73–413
Rushes–yards	25–29	32–186
Passing yards	283	227
Passing: Comp–Att–Int	21–31–0	26–41–0
Time of possession	25:51	34:09

Team	Category	Player	Statistics
Middle Tennessee	Passing	Nicholas Vattiato	21/31, 283 yards
Middle Tennessee	Rushing	Jaiden Credle	10 carries, 39 yards
Middle Tennessee	Receiving	Omari Kelly	6 receptions, 174 yards
Memphis	Passing	Seth Henigan	26/41, 227 yards
Memphis	Rushing	Mario Anderson Jr.	18 carries, 118 yards, TD
Memphis	Receiving	Roc Taylor	6 receptions, 69 yards

=== at South Florida ===
Memphis Tigers (4–1) at South Florida Bulls (2–3) – Game summary

Quarter	1	2	3	4	Total
Tigers	14	0	0	7	21
Bulls	0	3	0	0	3

at Camping World Stadium • Orlando, Florida

- Date: October 12th
- Game time: 2:30 p.m. CDT
- Game weather: Cloudy • Temperature: 82 °F (28 °C) • Wind: NE at 5 miles per hour (8.0 km/h)
- Game attendance: 3,365
- Referee: Charles Lamertina
- TV announcers (ESPN+): Drew Fellios (play-by-play) and Leger Douzable (analyst)

Game information

First quarter

- (9:50) MEM – DeMeer Blankumsee 31-yard pass from Seth Henigan, Caden Costa kick (Drive: 9 plays, 75 yards, 5:10; Memphis 7–0)
- (5:52) MEM – Mario Anderson Jr. 9-yard pass from Seth Henigan, Caden Costa kick (Drive: 3 plays, 33 yards, 0:37; Memphis 14–0)

Second quarter

- (0:00) USF – Nico Gramatica 52-yard field goal (Drive: 7 plays, 42 yards, 0:39; Memphis 14–3)

Third quarter

No scoring plays

Fourth quarter

- (11:17) MEM – Chandler Martin 0-yard fumble recovery, Caden Costa kick (Memphis 21–3)

Statistics	MEM	USF
First downs	17	12
Plays–yards	71–345	60–258
Rushes–yards	31–137	19–24
Passing yards	208	234
Passing: Comp–Att–Int	28–40–1	22–41–1
Time of possession	41:38	18:22

Team	Category	Player	Statistics
Memphis	Passing	Seth Henigan	28/40, 208 yards, 2 TD, INT
Memphis	Rushing	Brandon Thomas	13 carries, 67 yards
Memphis	Receiving	Anthony Landphere	6 receptions, 64 yards
South Florida	Passing	Bryce Archie	22/41, 234 yards, INT
South Florida	Rushing	Kelley Joiner	9 carries, 22 yards
South Florida	Receiving	Joshua Hardeman	2 receptions, 69 yards

=== North Texas ===
North Texas Mean Green (5–1) at Memphis Tigers (5–1) – Game summary

Quarter	1	2	3	4	Total
Mean Green	21	3	7	13	44
Tigers	14	14	7	17	52

at Simmons Bank Liberty Stadium • Memphis, Tennessee

- Date: October 19th
- Game time: 6:30 p.m. CDT
- Game weather: Clear • Temperature: 69 °F (21 °C) • Wind: E 5 miles per hour (8.0 km/h)
- Game attendance: 24,110
- Referee: Tim Rich
- TV announcers (ESPNU): Noah Reed (play-by-play) and Craig Haubert (analyst)

Game information

First quarter

- (11:05) MEM – Seth Henigan 4-yard run, Caden Costa kick (Drive: 9 plays, 75 yards, 3:55; Memphis 7–0)
- (10:54) UNT – DT Sheffield 75-yard run, Kali Nguma kick (Drive: 1 play, 75 yards, 0:11; Tied 7–7)
- (7:05) MEM – Mario Anderson Jr. 5-yard run, Caden Costa kick (Drive: 7 plays, 75 yards, 3:49; Memphis 14–7)
- (6:55) UNT – DT Sheffield 75-yard pass from Chandler Morris, Kali Nguma kick (Drive: 1 play, 75 yards, 0:10; Tied 14–14)
- (2:46) UNT – Shane Porter 10-yard run, Kali Nguma kick (Drive: 6 plays, 71 yards, 2:36; North Texas 21–14)

Second quarter

- (13:07) MEM – Brandon Thomas 1-yard run, Caden Costa kick (Drive: 10 plays, 79 yards, 4:34; Tied 21–21)
- (7:41) MEM – Mario Anderson Jr. 42-yard run, Tristian Vandenberg kick (Drive: 1 play, 42 yards, 0:08; Memphis 28–21)
- (0:00) UNT – Kali Nguma 34-yard field goal (Drive: 9 plays, 62 yards, 1:02; Memphis 28–24)

Third quarter

- (2:32) UNT – DT Sheffield 9-yard pass from Chandler Morris, Kali Nguma kick (Drive: 11 plays, 65 yards, 4:29; North Texas 31–28)
- (0:33) MEM – DeMeer Blankumsee 62-yard pass from Seth Henigan, Tristian Vandenberg kick (Drive: 4 plays, 75 yards, 1:59; Memphis 35–31)

Fourth quarter

- (13:59) UNT – Chandler Morris 49-yard run, Kali Nguma kick (Drive: 6 plays, 75 yards, 1:34; North Texas 38–35)
- (9:23) MEM – Mario Anderson Jr. 4-yard run, Tristian Vandenberg kick (Drive: 8 plays, 65 yards, 4:36; Memphis 42–38)
- (5:17) MEM – Mario Anderson Jr. 5-yard run, Tristian Vandenberg kick (Drive: 5 plays, 70 yards, 2:47; Memphis 49–38)
- (2:48) UNT – Blair Conwright 9-yard pass from Chandler Morris (Drive: 10 plays, 75 yards, 2:29; Memphis 49–44)
- (1:05) MEM – Tristian Vandenberg 43-yard field goal (Drive: 6 plays, 19 yards, 1:43; Memphis 52–44)

Statistics	UNT	MEM
First downs	32	21
Plays–yards	97–653	70–526
Rushes–yards	33–208	32–207
Passing yards	445	319
Passing: Comp–Att–Int	36–64–1	24–38–0
Time of possession	27:50	32:10

Team	Category	Player	Statistics
North Texas	Passing	Chandler Morris	36/61, 445 yards, 3 TD, INT
North Texas	Rushing	Chandler Morris	10 carries, 71 yards, TD
North Texas	Receiving	DT Sheffield	8 receptions, 122 yards, 2 TD
Memphis	Passing	Seth Henigan	24/38, 319 yards, TD
Memphis	Rushing	Mario Anderson Jr.	22 carries, 183 yards, 4 TD
Memphis	Receiving	DeMeer Blankumsee	6 receptions, 96 yards, TD

=== Charlotte ===
Charlotte 49ers (3–4) at Memphis Tigers (6–1) – Game summary

Quarter	1	2	3	4	Total
49ers	7	0	0	21	28
Tigers	0	7	14	12	33

at Simmons Bank Liberty Stadium • Memphis, Tennessee

- Date: October 26th
- Game time: 11:00 a.m. CDT
- Game weather: Sunny • Temperature: 67 °F (19 °C) • Wind: NE 11 miles per hour (18 km/h)
- Game attendance: 25,478
- Referee: Reid Jackson
- TV announcers (ESPNU): Courtney Lyle (play-by-play) and Rene Ingoglia (analyst)

Game information

First quarter

- (9:02) CLT – Cartevious Norton 17-yard run, Stephen Rusnak kick (Drive: 8 plays, 67 yards, 4:46; Charlotte 7–0)

Second quarter

- (14:17) MEM – DeMeer Blankumsee 2-yard pass from Seth Henigan, Tristian Vandenberg kick (Drive: 10 plays, 53 yards, 5:33; Tied 7–7)

Third quarter

- (7:49) MEM – Makari Bodiford 14-yard run, Tristian Vandenberg kick (Drive: 11 plays, 94 yards, 5:09; Memphis 14–7)
- (2:23) MEM – Mario Anderson Jr. 11-yard run, Tristian Vandenberg kick (Drive: 9 plays, 52 yards, 4:33; Memphis 21–7)

Fourth quarter

- (14:07) CLT – O'Mega Blake 39-yard pass from Deshawn Purdie, Stephen Rusnak kick (Drive: 8 plays, 75 yards, 3:16; Memphis 21–14)
- (8:02) CLT – Cartevious Norton 5-yard run, Stephen Rusnak kick (Drive: 8 plays, 75 yards, 4:04; Tied 21–21)
- (1:56) MEM – Tristian Vandenberg 21-yard field goal (Drive: 4 plays, 5 yards, 1:08; Memphis 24–21)
- (1:20) CLT – Hahsaun Wilson 18-yard run, Stephen Rusnak kick (Drive: 2 plays, 75 yards, 0:36; Charlotte 28–24)
- (0:31) MEM – Roc Taylor 24-yard pass from Seth Henigan, Tristian Vandenberg kick (Drive: 7 plays, 75 yards, 0:49; Memphis 31–28)
- (0:19) MEM – 0-yard safety (Memphis 33–28)

Statistics	CLT	MEM
First downs	13	23
Plays–yards	52–303	80–424
Rushes–yards	30–113	48–212
Passing yards	190	212
Passing: Comp–Att–Int	9–22–2	20–32–1
Time of possession	23:20	36:40

Team	Category	Player	Statistics
Charlotte	Passing	Deshawn Purdie	5/14, 152 yards, TD, INT
Charlotte	Rushing	Cartevious Norton	17 carries, 86 yards, 2 TD
Charlotte	Receiving	O'Mega Blake	3 receptions, 128 yards, TD
Memphis	Passing	Seth Henigan	20/32, 212 yards, 2 TD, INT
Memphis	Rushing	Mario Anderson Jr.	32 carries, 141 yards, TD
Memphis	Receiving	Roc Taylor	6 receptions, 99 yards, TD

=== at UTSA ===
Memphis Tigers (7–1) at UTSA Roadrunners (3–5) – Game summary

Quarter	1	2	3	4	Total
Tigers	10	14	0	12	36
Roadrunners	14	10	10	10	44

at Alamodome • San Antonio, Texas

- Date: November 2nd
- Game time: 11:00 a.m. CDT
- Game weather: None (played indoors)
- Game attendance: 17,198
- Referee: Kevin Randall
- TV announcers (ESPN2): Roy Philpott (play-by-play), Sam Acho (analyst), and Taylor Davis (sideline reporter)

Game information

First quarter

- (11:37) MEM – Mario Anderson Jr. 16-yard run, Caden Costa kick (Drive: 6 plays, 75 yards, 3:23; Memphis 7–0)
- (8:41) UTSA – Houston Thomas 9-yard pass from Owen McCown, Tate Sandell kick (Drive: 7 plays, 75 yards, 2:56; Tied 7–7)
- (2:50) MEM – Caden Costa 22-yard field goal (Drive: 12 plays, 71 yards, 5:51; Memphis 10–7)
- (0:55) UTSA – Dan Dishman 5-yard pass from Owen McCown, Tate Sandell kick (Drive: 5 plays, 75 yards, 1:55; UTSA 14–10)

Second quarter

- (11:15) MEM – DeMeer Blankumsee 21-yard pass from Seth Henigan, Caden Costa kick (Drive: 10 plays, 75 yards, 4:40; Memphis 17–14)
- (8:42) MEM – DeMeer Blankumsee 69-yard pass from Seth Henigan, Caden Costa kick (Drive: 2 plays, 83 yards, 0:49; Memphis 24–14)
- (5:57) UTSA – Tate Sandell 54-yard field goal (Drive: 7 plays, 39 yards, 2:45; Memphis 24–17)
- (1:27) UTSA – Patrick Overmyer 4-yard pass from Owen McCown, Tate Sandell kick (Drive: 5 plays, 47 yards, 2:23; Tied 24–24)

Third quarter

- (10:02) UTSA – Houston Thomas 8-yard pass from Owen McCown, Tate Sandell kick (Drive: 5 plays, 44 yards, 2:02; UTSA 31–24)
- (5:06) UTSA – Tate Sandell 32-yard field goal (Drive: 9 plays, 33 yards, 3:37; UTSA 34–24)

Fourth quarter

- (6:53) UTSA – Brandon High 2-yard run, Tate Sandell kick (Drive: 5 plays, 36 yards, 2:41; UTSA 41–24)
- (2:43) UTSA – Tate Sandell 42-yard field goal (Drive: 8 plays, 10 yards, 2:38; UTSA 44–24)
- (1:47) MEM – Koby Drake 24-yard pass from Seth Henigan (Drive: 5 plays, 75 yards, 0:56; UTSA 44–30)
- (0:48) MEM – Mario Anderson Jr. 5-yard pass from Seth Henigan (Drive: 6 plays, 50 yards, 0:59; UTSA 44–36)

Statistics	MEM	UTSA
First downs	27	19
Plays–yards	73–516	73–408
Rushes–yards	21–62	35–101
Passing yards	454	307
Passing: Comp–Att–Int	35–52–1	21–38–0
Time of possession	28:47	31:13

Team	Category	Player	Statistics
Memphis	Passing	Seth Henigan	35/52, 454 yards, 4 TD, INT
Memphis	Rushing	Mario Anderson Jr.	12 carries, 53 yards, TD
Memphis	Receiving	DeMeer Blankumsee	6 receptions, 142 yards, 2 TD
UTSA	Passing	Owen McCown	20/37, 280 yards, 4 TD
UTSA	Rushing	Owen McCown	5 carries, 28 yards
UTSA	Receiving	Chris Carpenter	4 receptions, 108 yards

=== Rice ===
Rice Owls (3–6) at Memphis Tigers (7–2) – Game summary

Quarter	1	2	3	4	Total
Owls	6	7	0	7	20
Tigers	0	17	0	10	27

at Simmons Bank Liberty Stadium • Memphis, Tennessee

- Date: November 8th
- Game time: 8:00 p.m. CST
- Game weather: Cloudy • Temperature: 61 °F (16 °C) • Wind: E 7 miles per hour (11 km/h)
- Game attendance: 23,692
- Referee: Charles Lamertina
- TV announcers (ESPN2): Beth Mowins (play-by-play), Andre Ware (analyst) and Paul Carcaterra (sideline)

Game information

First quarter

- (8:20) RICE – Tim Horn 25-yard field goal (Drive: 5 plays, 13 yards, 2:14; Rice 3–0)
- (0:24) RICE – Tim Horn 28-yard field goal (Drive: 11 plays, 76 yards, 5:06; Rice 6–0)

Second quarter

- (6:21) MEM – Brendan Doyle 9-yard pass from Seth Henigan, Tristian Vandenberg kick (Drive: 12 plays, 77 yards, 5:44; Memphis 7–6)
- (1:28) MEM – Mario Anderson Jr. 10-yard run, Tristian Vandenberg kick (Drive: 5 plays, 73 yards, 1:39; Memphis 14–6)
- (0:38) RICE – Matt Sykes 27-yard pass from E. J. Warner, Tim Horn kick (Drive: 5 plays, 75 yards, 0:50; Memphis 14–13)
- (0:02) MEM – Tristian Vandenberg 42-yard field goal (Drive: 6 plays, 51 yards, 0:36; Memphis 17–13)

Third quarter

No scoring plays

Fourth quarter

- (11:42) MEM – Brandon Thomas 14-yard run, Tristian Vandenberg kick (Drive: 10 plays, 92 yards, 4:14; Memphis 24–13)
- (4:23) MEM – Tristian Vandenberg 42-yard field goal (Drive: 6 plays, 17 yards, 3:40; Memphis 27–13)
- (1:55) RICE – Elijah Mojarro 5-yard pass from E. J. Warner, Tim Horn kick (Drive: 8 plays, 75 yards, 2:28; Memphis 27–20)

Statistics	RICE	MEM
First downs	20	22
Plays–yards	68–367	72–366
Rushes–yards	23–121	41–207
Passing yards	246	159
Passing: Comp–Att–Int	29–45–0	14–31–1
Time of possession	30:11	29:47

Team	Category	Player	Statistics
Rice	Passing	E. J. Warner	29/45, 246 yards, 2 TD
Rice	Rushing	Quinton Jackson	6 carries, 70 yards
Rice	Receiving	Matt Sykes	6 receptions, 76 yards, TD
Memphis	Passing	Seth Henigan	14/31, 159 yards, TD, INT
Memphis	Rushing	Mario Anderson Jr.	25 carries, 144 yards, TD
Memphis	Receiving	Roc Taylor	4 receptions, 52 yards

=== UAB (Battle for the Bones) ===
UAB Blazers (2–7) at Memphis Tigers (8–2) – Game summary

Quarter	1	2	3	4	Total
Blazers	0	8	3	7	18
Tigers	11	7	7	28	53

at Simmons Bank Liberty Stadium • Memphis, Tennessee

- Date: November 16th
- Game time: 7:00 p.m. CST
- Game weather: Clear • Temperature: 54 °F (12 °C) • Wind: SE 3 miles per hour (4.8 km/h)
- Game attendance: 24,225
- Referee: Edwin Lee
- TV announcers (ESPN2): Brian Custer (play-by-play), Rod Gilmore (analyst) and Tori Petry (sideline)

Game information

First quarter

- (11:38) MEM – Brandon Thomas 2-yard run, Colby Cox pass (Drive: 7 plays, 75 yards, 3:22; Memphis 8–0)
- (3:43) MEM – Tristian Vandenberg 41-yard field goal (Drive: 10 plays, 67 yards, 4:42; Memphis 11–0)

Second quarter

- (6:34) MEM – Anthony Landphere 10-yard pass from Seth Henigan, Tristian Vandenberg kick (Drive: 9 plays, 53 yards, 3:43; Memphis 18–0)
- (1:55) UAB – Kam Shanks 10-yard pass from Jalen Kitna, Terrell McDonald rush (Drive: 10 plays, 70 yards, 4:39; Memphis 18–8)

Third quarter

- (10:57) MEM – Greg Desrosiers Jr. 19-yard pass from Seth Henigan, Tristian Vandenberg kick (Drive: 6 plays, 45 yards, 2:38; Memphis 25–8)
- (6:37) UAB – Jonah Delange 32-yard field goal (Drive: 10 plays, 61 yards, 4:20; Memphis 25–11)

Fourth quarter

- (14:56) MEM – Anthony Landphere 2-yard pass from Seth Henigan, Tristian Vandenberg kick (Drive: 12 plays, 75 yards, 6:41; Memphis 32–11)
- (13:23) UAB – Terrell McDonald 1-yard run, Jonah Delange kick (Drive: 4 plays, 75 yards, 1:33; Memphis 32–18)
- (10:13) MEM – Anthony Landphere 10-yard pass from Seth Henigan, Tristian Vandenberg kick (Drive: 6 plays, 67 yards, 3:03; Memphis 39–18)
- (4:57) MEM – Mario Anderson Jr. 11-yard run, Tristian Vandenberg kick (Drive: 8 plays, 66 yards, 4:05; Memphis 46–18)
- (0:43) MEM – Harris Boyd 4-yard run, Tristian Vandenberg kick (Drive: 4 plays, 21 yards, 1:47; Memphis 53–18)

Statistics	UAB	MEM
First downs	16	31
Plays–yards	64–352	74–526
Rushes–yards	20–28	40–227
Passing yards	324	299
Passing: Comp–Att–Int	28–44–2	23–34–0
Time of possession	25:37	34:23

Team	Category	Player	Statistics
UAB	Passing	Jalen Kitna	27/43, 253 yards, TD, 2 INT
UAB	Rushing	Lee Beebe Jr.	12 carries, 42 yards
UAB	Receiving	Corri Milliner	3 receptions, 74 yards
Memphis	Passing	Seth Henigan	23/34, 299 yards, 4 TD
Memphis	Rushing	Mario Anderson Jr.	22 carries, 138 yards, TD
Memphis	Receiving	Koby Drake	3 receptions, 56 yards

=== at No. 17 Tulane ===
Memphis Tigers (9–2) at No. 17 Tulane Green Wave (9–2) – Game summary

Quarter	1	2	3	4	Total
Tigers	7	10	7	10	34
No. 17 Green Wave	10	0	0	14	24

at Yulman Stadium • New Orleans, Louisiana

- Date: November 28th
- Game time: 6:30 p.m. CST
- Game weather: Temperature: 56 °F (13 °C) • Wind: SW at 12 miles per hour (19 km/h) • Weather: Partly Cloudy
- Game attendance: 25,021
- Referee: Kevin Randall
- TV announcers (ESPN): Matt Barrie (play-by-play), Dan Mullen (analyst) and Harry Lyles Jr. (sideline)

Game information

First quarter

- (11:04) MEM – Greg Desrosiers Jr. 17-yard pass from Seth Henigan, Tristian Vandenberg kick (Drive: 8 plays, 75 yards, 3:56; Memphis 7–0)
- (6:58) TUL – Patrick Durkin 44-yard field goal (Drive: 10 plays, 49 yards, 4:06; Memphis 7–3)
- (0:34) TUL – Mario Williams 7-yard pass from Darian Mensah, Patrick Durkin kick (Drive: 8 plays, 63 yards, 4:21; Tulane 10–7)

Second quarter

- (10:40) MEM – Greg Desrosiers Jr. 25-yard pass from Seth Henigan, Tristian Vandenberg kick (Drive: 9 plays, 75 yards, 4:54; Memphis 14–10)
- (1:45) MEM – Tristian Vandenberg 28-yard field goal (Drive: 14 plays, 60 yards, 6:31; Memphis 17–10)

Third quarter

- (11:02) MEM – Greg Desrosiers Jr. 29-yard pass from Seth Henigan, Tristian Vandenberg kick (Drive: 5 plays, 53 yards, 2:22; Memphis 24–10)

Fourth quarter

- (14:57) MEM – Tristian Vandenberg 23-yard field goal (Drive: 16 plays, 65 yards, 8:56; Memphis 27–10)
- (13:29) TUL – Arnold Barnes III 2-yard run, Patrick Durkin kick (Drive: 5 plays, 78 yards, 1:22; Memphis 27–17)
- (2:41) MEM – Mario Anderson Jr. 47-yard run, Tristian Vandenberg kick (Drive: 7 plays, 98 yards, 4:16; Memphis 34–17)
- (1:08) TUL – Shazz Preston 3-yard pass from Darian Mensah, Patrick Durkin kick (Drive: 8 plays, 48 yards, 1:26; Memphis 34–24)

Statistics	MEM	TULN
First downs	26	15
Plays–yards	77–454	51–374
Rushes–yards	48–236	18–57
Passing yards	218	317
Passing: Comp–Att–Int	22–29–0	21–33–1
Time of possession	39:40	20:20

Team	Category	Player	Statistics
Memphis	Passing	Seth Henigan	22/29, 218 yards, 2 TD
Memphis	Rushing	Mario Anderson Jr.	24 carries, 177 yards, TD
Memphis	Receiving	Roc Taylor	7 receptions, 96 yards
Tulane	Passing	Darian Mensah	21/33, 317 yards, 2 TD, INT
Tulane	Rushing	Shaadie Clayton-Johnson	2 carries, 29 yards
Tulane	Receiving	Mario Williams	7 receptions, 130 yards, TD

=== vs. West Virginia (Frisco Bowl) ===
2024 Frisco Bowl
No. 25 Memphis Tigers (10–2) vs. West Virginia Mountaineers (6–6) – Game summary

Quarter	1	2	3	4	Total
No. 25 Tigers	7	21	7	7	42
Mountaineers	0	17	6	14	37

at Toyota Stadium • Frisco, TX

- Date: December 17th
- Game time: 8:00 p.m.
- Game weather: Temperature: 68 °F (20 °C), partly cloudy • Wind: S at 11 mph (18 km/h)
- Game attendance: 12,022
- Referee: Jeremy Parker
- TV announcers (ESPN): Mike Monaco (play-by-play), Kirk Morrison (analyst), and Dawn Davenport (sideline)

Game information

First Quarter

- (5:06) MEM – Mario Anderson Jr. 4 yard pass from Seth Henigan, Tristian Vandenburg kick (Drive: 5 plays, 45 yards, 2:50; Memphis 7–0)

Second Quarter

- (14:56) MEM – Tristian Vandenburg 34 yard field goal (Drive: 7 plays, 25 yards, 2:48; Memphis 10–0)
- (10:46) MEM – Greg Desrosiers Jr. 46 yard run, Tristian Vandenburg kick (Drive: 1 play, 46 yards, 0:10; Memphis 17–0)
- (7:28) WVU – Hudson Clement 33 yard pass from Garrett Greene, Michael Hayes II kick (Drive: 6 plays, 75 yards, 3:18; Memphis 17–7)
- (2:30) MEM – Tristian Vandenburg 42 yard field goal (Drive: 11 plays, 51 yards, 4:58; Memphis 20–7)
- (1:44) WVU – Garrett Greene 56 yard run, Michael Hayes II kick (Drive: 4 plays, 75 yards, 0:46; Memphis 20–14)
- (0:55) MEM – Demeer Blankumsee 18 yard pass from Seth Henigan, Demeer Blankumsee pass from Seth Henigan for 2-pt conversion (Drive: 5 plays, 75 yards, 0:47; Memphis 28–14)
- (0:00) WVU – Michael Hayes II 46 yard field goal (Drive: 7 plays, 47 yards, 0:55; Memphis 28–17)

Third Quarter

- (11:10) MEM – Mario Anderson Jr. 3 yard run, Tristian Vandenburg kick (Drive: 8 plays, 75 yards, 3:50; Memphis 35–17)
- (7:15) WVU – Hudson Clement 10 yard pass from Garrett Greene, 2-pt conversion failed (Drive: 10 plays, 75 yards, 3:55; Memphis 35–23)

Fourth Quarter

- (12:02) WVU – CJ Donaldson Jr. 1 yard run, Michael Hayes II kick (Drive: 16 plays, 90 yards, 7:51; Memphis 35–30)
- (10:49) MEM – Brandon Thomas 1 yard run, Tristian Vandenburg kick (Drive: 2 plays, 90 yards, 1:05; Memphis 42–30)
- (4:17) WVU – CJ Donaldson Jr. 1 yard run, Michael Hayes II kick (Drive: 12 plays, 75 yards, 6:32; Memphis 42–37)

Statistics	MEM	WVU
First downs	18	25
Total yards	474	534
Rushing yards	180	206
Passing yards	294	328
Passing: Comp–Att–Int	18–26–0	29–40–1
Time of possession	26:20	33:40

Team	Category	Player	Statistics
Memphis	Passing	Seth Henigan	18/26, 294 yards, 2 TD
Memphis	Rushing	Mario Anderson	17 carries, 70 yards, TD
Memphis	Receiving	DeMeer Blankumsee	4 receptions, 120 yards, TD
West Virginia	Passing	Garrett Greene	29/40, 328 yards, 2 TD, INT
West Virginia	Rushing	Garrett Greene	7 carries, 95 yards, TD
West Virginia	Receiving	Hudson Clement	11 receptions, 166 yards, 2 TD

== Rankings ==
Ranking movements Legend: ██ Increase in ranking ██ Decrease in ranking — = Not ranked RV = Received votes
	Week																
Poll	Pre	1	2	3	4	5	6	7	8	9	10	11	12	13	14	15	Final
AP	RV	RV	RV	RV	—	—	—	—	—	RV	—	—	RV	RV	25	25	24
Coaches	RV	RV	25	23	—	—	—	RV	RV	25	RV	RV	24	23	24	23	23
CFP	Not released										—	—	—	—	25	25	Not released
