= 2024 Albany Great Danes football team =

American college football season

2024 Albany Great Danes football
- Conference: CAA Football
- Record: 4–8 (2–6 CAA)
- Head coach: Greg Gattuso (11th season)
- Offensive coordinator: Jared Ambrose (3rd season)
- Defensive coordinator: Bill Nesselt (2nd season)
- Co-defensive coordinator: Darrin Walls (2nd season)
- Home stadium: Bob Ford Field at Tom & Mary Casey Stadium

2024 Coastal Athletic Association Football Conference standings
	Conf.			Overall
Team	W		L	W		L
No. 15 Richmond +^	8	–	0	10	–	3
No. 9 Rhode Island* +^	7	–	1	11	–	3
No. 12 Villanova ^	6	–	2	10	–	4
Delaware*	6	–	2	9	–	2
No. 23 New Hampshire ^	6	–	2	8	–	5
Stony Brook	5	–	3	8	–	4
Towson	5	–	3	7	–	5
Elon	5	–	3	6	–	6
William & Mary	4	–	4	7	–	5
Monmouth	4	–	4	6	–	6
Maine	3	–	5	5	–	7
Albany	2	–	6	4	–	8
Hampton	2	–	6	5	–	7
Campbell	1	–	7	3	–	9
Bryant	0	–	8	2	–	10
North Carolina A&T	0	–	8	1	–	11
+ – Conference co-champions; ^ – FCS playoff participant; * Delaware ineligible for rankings and 2024 FCS playoffs due to transition to the FBS. Richmond and Rhode Island named co-champions as Rhode Island's only CAA loss was to Delaware.; Rankings from STATS Poll

The 2024 Albany Great Danes football team represented the University at Albany, SUNY as a member of the Coastal Athletic Association Football Conference (CAA Football) during the 2024 NCAA Division I FCS football season. The Great Danes were led by 11th-year head coach Greg Gattuso and played their home games at Bob Ford Field at Tom & Mary Casey Stadium.

== Schedule ==
Date	Time	Opponent	Rank	Site	TV	Result	Attendance
August 31	7:00 p.m.	LIU*	No. 16	Bob Ford Field at Tom & Mary Casey Stadium; Albany, NY	FloSports	W 27–21	6,169
September 7	6:00 p.m.	at West Virginia*	No. 16	Milan Puskar Stadium; Morgantown, WV	ESPN+	L 14–49	50,073
September 14	4:00 p.m.	at No. 4 Idaho*	No. 17	Kibbie Dome; Moscow, ID	ESPN+	L 13–41	11,432
September 28	3:30 p.m.	Maine	No. 21	Bob Ford Field at Tom & Mary Casey Stadium; Albany, NY	FloSports	L 20–34	8,019
October 5	1:00 p.m.	at Cornell*		Schoellkopf Field; Ithaca, NY	ESPN+	W 31–10	4,827
October 12	1:00 p.m.	at Bryant		Beirne Stadium; Smithfield, RI	FloSports	W 24–17	1,850
October 19	3:30 p.m.	Elon^{†}		Bob Ford Field at Tom & Mary Casey Stadium; Albany, NY	FloSports	L 14–30	7,204
October 26	3:00 p.m.	at Delaware		Delaware Stadium; Newark, DE	FloSports	L 14–28	17,847
November 2	1:00 p.m.	New Hampshire		Bob Ford Field at Tom & Mary Casey Stadium; Albany, NY	FloSports	L 14–31	3,225
November 9	1:00 p.m.	at No. 17 Stony Brook		Kenneth P. LaValle Stadium; Stony Brook, New York (rivalry)	FloSports	L 6–24	5,717
November 16	1:00 p.m.	at No. 15 Rhode Island		Meade Stadium; Kingston, RI	FloSports	L 17–20	4,605
November 23	1:00 p.m.	Hampton		Bob Ford Field at Tom & Mary Casey Stadium; Albany, NY	FloSports	W 41–34	2,341
*Non-conference game; ^{†}Homecoming; Rankings from STATS Poll released prior to the game; All times are in Eastern time

== Game summaries ==
=== LIU ===
Game One – LIU Sharks (0–0) vs No. 16 Albany Great Danes (0–0) – Game summary

Quarter	1	2	3	4	Total
Sharks	0	14	7	0	21
No. 16 Great Danes	3	14	10	0	27

at Bob Ford Field at Tom & Mary Casey Stadium • Albany, NY

- Date: August 31, 2024
- Game time: 7:00 pm
- Game weather: Cloudy • Temperature: 75 °F (24 °C) • Wind: N 8 mph
- Game attendance: 6,169
- Referee: Justin Ackley
- TV: FloSports

Game information

First quarter

- (10:34) ALB – John Opalko 42-yard field goal (Drive: 7 plays, 27 yards, 2:50; Albany 3–0)

Second quarter

- (14:54) LIU – Brandon Niemenski 21-yard pass from Luca Stanzani, Michael Coney kick (Drive: 8 plays, 83 yards, 4:49; LIU 7–3)
- (3:54) ALB – Jack Iuliano 20-yard fumble recovery, John Opalko kick (Albany 10–7)
- (0:41) LIU – Michael Love 12-yard pass from Luca Stanzani, Michael Coney kick (Drive: 6 plays, 75 yards, 3:13; LIU 14–10)
- (0:30) ALB – Seven McGee 75-yard pass from Myles Burkett, John Opalko kick (Drive: 1 play, 75 yards, 0:11; Albany 17–14)

Third quarter

- (10:49) LIU – Ludovick Choquette 11-yard pass from Luca Stanzani, Michael Coney kick (Drive: 5 plays, 37 yards, 3:04; LIU 21–17)
- (9:57) ALB – Griffin Woodell 3-yard run, John Opalko kick (Drive: 2 plays, 44 yards, 0:41; Albany 24–21)
- (0:31) ALB – John Opaklo 41-yard field goal (Drive: 14 plays, 55 yards, 7:01; Albany 27–21)

Fourth quarter

No scoring plays

Statistics	LIU	ALB
First downs	20	12
Total yards	358	255
Rushing yards	179	90
Passing yards	179	165
Passing: Comp–Att–Int	20–31–0	12–26–0
Time of possession	32:04	27:56

Team	Category	Player	Statistics
LIU	Passing	Luca Stanzani	20/31, 179 yards, 3 TD
LIU	Rushing	Ludovick Choquette	15 carries, 128 yards
LIU	Receiving	Michael Love	6 receptions, 69 yards, TD
Albany	Passing	Myles Burkett	12/26, 165 yards, TD
Albany	Rushing	Griffin Woodell	20 carries, 85 yards, TD
Albany	Receiving	Seven McGee	5 receptions, 119 yards, TD

=== at West Virginia (FBS) ===
Game Two – No. 16 Albany Great Danes (1–0) vs West Virginia Mountaineers (FBS) (0–1) – Game summary

Quarter	1	2	3	4	Total
No. 16 Great Danes	0	14	0	0	14
Mountaineers (FBS)	14	14	14	7	49

at Milan Puskar Stadium • Morgantown, WV

- Date: September 7, 2024
- Game time: 6:00 pm
- Game weather: 68 °F (20 °C)
- Game attendance: 50,073
- TV announcers (ESPN+): Richard Cross (play-by-play) and Barrett Brooks (analyst)

Game information

First quarter

- WVU – Jahiem White, 14-yard TD run, Michael Hayes II kick, 9:34 (WVU 7-0)
- WVU – Justin Robinson, 12-yard TD pass from Garrett Greene, Hayes II kick, 5:41 (WVU 14-0)

Second quarter

- WVU – Kole Taylor, 39-yard TD pass from Greene, Hayes II kick, 14:49 (WVU 21-0)
- UAlbany – Griffin Woodell, 7-yard TD run, John Opalko kick, 4:40 (WVU 21-7)
- UAlbany – Jacari Carter, 33-yard TD pass from Myles Burkett, Opalko kick, 1:54 (WVU 21-14)
- WVU – Greene, 40-yard TD run, Hayes II kick, 0:39 (WVU 28-14)

Third quarter

- WVU – Hudson Clement, 10-yard TD pass from Greene, Hayes II kick, 5:22 (WVU 35-14)
- WVU - C.J. Donaldson Jr., 2-yard TD run, Hayes II kick, 0:49 (WVU 42-14)

Fourth quarter

- WVU - Nicco Marchiol, 12-yard TD run, RJ Kocan Kick, 7:22 (WVU 49-14)

Statistics	ALB	WVU
First downs	21	31
Total yards	374	553
Rushing yards	68	305
Passing yards	306	248
Passing: Comp–Att–Int	18–39–0	20–26–0
Time of possession	35:18	24:42

Team	Category	Player	Statistics
Albany	Passing	Myles Burkett	18/39, 306 yards, TD
Albany	Rushing	Jojo Uga	9 carries, 57 yards
Albany	Receiving	Seven McGee	4 receptions, 90 yards
West Virginia	Passing	Garrett Greene	17/23, 236 yards, 3 TD
West Virginia	Rushing	C.J. Donaldson Jr.	14 carries, 125 yards, TD
West Virginia	Receiving	Kole Taylor	3 receptions, 47 yards, TD

=== at No. 4 Idaho ===
Game Three – No. 17 Albany Great Danes (1–1) vs No. 4 Idaho Vandals (1–1) – Game summary

Quarter	1	2	3	4	Total
No. 17 Great Danes	3	0	3	7	13
No. 4 Vandals	13	14	14	0	41

at Kibbie Dome • Moscow, ID

- Date: September 14, 2024
- Game time: 4:00 pm
- Game weather: None (played indoors)
- Game attendance: 11,432
- Referee: Jeff Rink
- TV announcers (ESPN+): Bob Castle (play-by-play) and Brian Standley (analyst)

Game information

First quarter

- IDHO – Jordan Dwyer 12-yard pass from Jack Wagner (run failed), 8:39. Vandals 6–0. Drive: 3 plays, 80 yards, 1:39.
- ALB – John Opalko 25-yard field goal, 3:51. Vandals 6–3. Drive: 9 plays, 67 yards, 4:48.
- IDHO – Nate Thomas 2-yard run (Cameron Pope kick), 0:51. Vandals 13–3. Drive: 9 plays, 79 yards, 2:54.

Second quarter

- IDHO – Jordan Dwyer 4-yard pass from Jack Wagner (Cameron Pope kick), 12:29. Vandals 20–3. Drive: 7 plays, 54 yards, 2:12.
- IDHO – Andrew Marshall 47-yard punt return (Cameron Pope kick), 7:11. Vandals 27–3.

Third quarter

- IDHO – Nate Thomas 1-yard run (Cameron Pope kick), 7:02. Vandals 34–3. Drive: 5 plays, 61 yards, 2:35.
- IDHO – Tommy McCormick 32-yard interception return (Cameron Pope kick), 6:53. Vandals 41–3.
- ALB – John Opalko 33-yard field goal, 4:38. Vandals 41–6. Drive: 5 plays, 59 yards, 2:15.

Fourth quarter

- ALB – Levi Wentz 19-yard pass from Myles Burkett (John Opalko kick), 1:52. Vandals 41–13. Drive: 7 plays, 73 yards, 3:08.

Statistics	ALB	IDHO
First downs	21	20
Total yards	350	420
Rushing yards	60	247
Passing yards	290	173
Passing: Comp–Att–Int	23–38–1	11–23–0
Time of possession	35:30	24:30

Team	Category	Player	Statistics
Albany	Passing	Myles Burkett	23/38, 290 yards, TD, INT
Albany	Rushing	Griffin Woodell	14 rushes, 23 yards
Albany	Receiving	Levi Wentz	5 receptions, 114 yards, TD
Idaho	Passing	Jack Wagner	10/20, 156 yards, 2 TD
Idaho	Rushing	Nate Thomas	8 rushes, 75 yards, 2 TD
Idaho	Receiving	Mark Hamper	3 receptions, 74 yards

=== Maine ===
Game Four – Maine Black Bears (2–2) vs No. 21 Albany Great Danes (1–2) – Game summary

Quarter	1	2	3	4	Total
Black Bears	3	7	9	15	34
No. 21 Great Danes	0	14	0	6	20

at Bob Ford Field at Tom & Mary Casey Stadium • Albany, NY

- Date: Saturday September 28, 2024
- Game time: 3:30 PM EST
- Game weather: Sunny • Temperature: 79 °F (26 °C) • Wind: SE at 5 miles per hour (8.0 km/h)
- Game attendance: 8,019
- Referee: Paul Matt Overton
- TV announcers (FloSports): TBD

Game information

First quarter

- (9:28) UMA – Joey Bryson 40-yard field goal (Drive: 11 plays, 58 yards, 5:26; Maine 3–0)

Second quarter

- (14:19) ALB – Jojo Uga 2-yard run, John Opalko kick (Drive: 8 plays, 74 yards, 4:12; Albany 7–3)
- (1:57) UMA – Jaharie Martin 1-yard run, Joey Bryson kick (Drive: 8 plays, 62 yards, 3:36; Maine 10–7)
- (0:14) ALB – Seven McGee 13-yard pass from Myles Burkett, John Opalko kick (Drive: 8 plays, 75 yards, 1:38; Albany 14–10)

Third quarter

- (10:14) UMA – Joey Bryson 40-yard field goal (Drive: 6 plays, 16 yards, 3:57; Albany 14–13)
- (1:58) UMA – Cooper Heisey 2-yard pass from Carter Peevy (Drive: 10 plays, 55 yards, 6:15; Maine 19–14)

Fourth quarter

- (7:04) UMA – Cooper Heisey 2-yard pass from Carter Peevy, Joe Gillette pass (Drive: 12 plays, 83 yards, 7:56; Maine 27–14)
- (5:20) ALB – Seven McGee 32-yard pass from Myles Burkett (Drive: 6 plays, 66 yards, 1:39; Maine 27–20)
- (1:46) UMA – Jamaree Gibson 78-yard interception, Joey Bryson kick (Maine 34–20)

Statistics	ME	ALB
First downs	27	16
Total yards	337	260
Rushing yards	135	58
Passing yards	202	202
Passing: Comp–Att–Int	20–24–0	19–32–2
Time of possession	39:10	19:21

Team	Category	Player	Statistics
Maine	Passing	Carter Peevy	20/24, 202 yards, 2 TD
Maine	Rushing	Jaharie Martin	19 carries, 82 yards, TD
Maine	Receiving	Molayo Irefin	5 receptions, 68 yards
Albany	Passing	Myles Burkett	19/32, 202 yards, 2 TD, 2 INT
Albany	Rushing	Griffin Woodell	9 carries, 36 yards
Albany	Receiving	Seven McGee	5 receptions, 83 yards, 2 TD

=== at Cornell ===
Game Five – Albany Great Danes (1–3) at Cornell Big Red (1–1) – Game summary

Quarter	1	2	3	4	Total
Great Danes	3	3	10	15	31
Big Red	0	7	3	0	10

at Schoellkopf Field • Ithaca, NY

- Date: October 5, 2024
- Game time: 1:00 p.m.
- Game weather: Sunny • Temperature: 63 °F (17 °C) • Wind: NW at 7 miles per hour (11 km/h)
- Game attendance: 4,827
- Referee: Todd Boyd
- TV: ESPN+

Game information

First quarter

- (8:58) ALB – John Opalko 37-yard field goal (Drive: 10 plays, 49 yards, 5:58; Albany 3–0)

Second quarter

- (7:40) ALB – John Opalko 18-yard field goal (Drive: 15 plays, 81 yards, 6:13; Albany 6–0)
- (4:25) COR – Parker Woodring 4-yard pass from Jameson Wang, Alan Zhao kick (Drive: 8 plays, 75 yards, 3:15; Cornell 7–6)

Third quarter

- (12:54) ALB – Jacari Carter 52-yard pass from Myles Burkett, John Opalko kick (Drive: 1 play, 52 yards, 0:08; Albany 13–7)
- (8:28) COR – Alan Zhao 35-yard field goal (Drive: 12 plays, 65 yards, 4:21; Albany 13–10)
- (5:37) ALB – John Opalko 43-yard field goal (Drive: 7 plays, 31 yards, 2:44; Albany 16–10)

Fourth quarter

- (3:08) ALB – Jojo Uga 16-yard run, Levi Wentz pass (Drive: 12 plays, 77 yards, 7:13; Albany 24–10)
- (1:22) ALB – Faysal Aden 84-yard run, John Opalko kick (Drive: 3 plays, 91 yards, 0:26; Albany 31–10)

Statistics	ALB	COR
First downs	25	14
Total yards	498	310
Rushing yards	273	97
Passing yards	225	213
Passing: Comp–Att–Int	21–30–0	23–32–0
Time of possession	36:39	23:21

Team	Category	Player	Statistics
Albany	Passing	Myles Burkett	21/30, 225 yards, TD
Albany	Rushing	Faysal Aden	12 carries, 133 yards, TD
Albany	Receiving	Seven McGee	8 receptions, 70 yards
Cornell	Passing	Jameson Wang	22/31, 187 yards, TD
Cornell	Rushing	Johntu Reed	3 carries, 36 yards
Cornell	Receiving	Samuel Musungu	6 receptions, 87 yards

=== at Bryant ===
Game Six – Albany Great Danes (2–3) at Bryant Bulldogs (2–3) – Game summary

Quarter	1	2	3	4	Total
Great Danes	0	0	0	0	0
Bulldogs	0	0	0	0	0

at Beirne Stadium • Smithfield, RI

- Date: October 12, 2024
- Game time: 1:00 p.m.
- TV: FloSports

Game information

First quarter
Second quarter
Third quarter
Fourth quarter

Statistics	ALB	BRY
First downs		
Total yards		
Rushing yards		
Passing yards		
Passing: Comp–Att–Int		
Time of possession		

Team	Category	Player	Statistics
Albany	Passing		
Albany	Rushing		
Albany	Receiving		
Bryant	Passing		
Bryant	Rushing		
Bryant	Receiving		

=== Elon ===
Game Seven – Elon Phoenix (1–5) vs Albany Great Danes (3–3) – Game summary

Quarter	1	2	3	4	Total
Phoenix	0	0	0	0	0
Great Danes	0	0	0	0	0

at Bob Ford Field at Tom & Mary Casey Stadium • Albany, NY

- Date: Saturday October 19, 2024
- Game time: 3:30 PM EST
- Game weather: 0 °F (−18 °C)
- TV announcers (FloSports): TBD

Game information

First quarter
Second quarter
Third quarter
Fourth quarter

Statistics	ELON	ALB
First downs		
Total yards		
Rushing yards		
Passing yards		
Passing: Comp–Att–Int		
Time of possession		

Team	Category	Player	Statistics
Elon	Passing		
Elon	Rushing		
Elon	Receiving		
Albany	Passing		
Albany	Rushing		
Albany	Receiving		

=== at Delaware ===
Game Eight – Albany Great Danes (3–4) vs Delaware Fightin' Blue Hens (6–1) – Game summary

Quarter	1	2	3	4	Total
Great Danes	7	0	7	0	14
Fightin' Blue Hens	14	7	0	7	28

at Delaware Stadium • Newark, DE

- Date: Saturday October 26, 2024
- Game time: 3:00 PM EST
- Game weather: Sunny
- Game attendance: 17,847
- TV announcers (FloSports): TBD

Game information

First quarter
Second quarter
Third quarter
Fourth quarter

Statistics	ALB	DEL
First downs	22	19
Total yards	342	353
Rushing yards	134	180
Passing yards	208	173
Passing: Comp–Att–Int	14–29–1	18–27–0
Time of possession	31:58	28:02

Team	Category	Player	Statistics
Albany	Passing	Myles Burkett	14/28, 208 yards, TD, INT
Albany	Rushing	Faysal Aden	10 rushes, 57 yards
Albany	Receiving	Seven McGee	3 receptions, 77 yards
Delaware	Passing	Nick Minicucci	18/27, 173 yards, 3 TD
Delaware	Rushing	Marcus Yarns	13 rushes, 127 yards, TD
Delaware	Receiving	JoJo Bermudez	6 receptions, 46 yards

=== New Hampshire ===
Game Nine – New Hampshire Wildcats (4–4) at Albany Great Danes (3–5) – Game summary

Quarter	1	2	3	4	Total
Wildcats	14	10	0	7	31
Great Danes	0	0	0	14	14

at Bob Ford Field, Albany, NY

- Date: Saturday November 2, 2024
- Game time: 1:00 p.m.
- Game weather: Cloudy 50 °F (10 °C) · Wind: South 8 mph (13 km/h)
- Game attendance: 3,225
- TV announcers (FloSports): TBD
- Box score

Game information

First quarter
Second quarter
Third quarter
Fourth quarter

Statistics	UNH	ALB
First downs		
Total yards		
Rushing yards		
Passing yards		
Passing: Comp–Att–Int		
Time of possession		

Team	Category	Player	Statistics
New Hampshire	Passing		
New Hampshire	Rushing		
New Hampshire	Receiving		
Albany	Passing		
Albany	Rushing		
Albany	Receiving		

=== at No. 17 Stony Brook (rivalry) ===
Game Ten – Albany Great Danes (3–6) vs No. 17 Stony Brook Seawolves (7–2) – Game summary

Quarter	1	2	3	4	Total
Great Danes	0	6	0	0	6
No. 17 Seawolves	7	0	3	14	24

at Kenneth P. LaValle Stadium, Stony Brook, NY

- Date: Saturday November 9, 2024
- Game time: 1:00 PM EST
- Game weather: 50 °F (10 °C)
- Game attendance: 5,717
- Referee: Justin Ackley
- TV announcers (FloSports): Jonny Wincott (play-by-play), Brandon London (analyst) and Matt Levine (sideline)

Game information

First quarter

- (10:29) SBU – Roland Dempster 2-yard run, Enda Kirby kick (Drive: 10 plays, 80 yards, 2:14; Stony Brook 7–0)

Second quarter

- (13:39) ALB – Caden Burti 23-yard pass from Van Weber, John Opalko PAT failed (Drive: 6 plays, 51 yards, 2:55; Stony Brook 7–6)

Third quarter

- (8:49) SBU – Enda Kirby 41-yard field goal (Drive: 5 plays, 21 yards, 1:49; Stony Brook 10–6)

Fourth quarter

- (11:51) SBU – Jayce Freeman 20-yard pass from Tyler Knoop, Enda Kirby kick (Drive: 10 plays, 90 yards, 5:04; Stony Brook 17–6)
- (2:41) SBU – Roland Dempster 4-yard run, Enda Kirby kick (Drive: 6 plays, 33 yards, 3:54; Stony Brook 24–6)

Statistics	ALB	STBK
First downs	17	15
Total yards	365	321
Rushing yards	153	92
Passing yards	212	229
Passing: Comp–Att–Int	23–36–1	19–32–0
Time of possession	32:29	27:31

Team	Category	Player	Statistics
Albany	Passing	Van Weber	20/31, 201 yards, TD, INT
Albany	Rushing	Jojo Uga	17 carries, 56 yards
Albany	Receiving	Caden Burti	4 receptions, 68 yards, TD
Stony Brook	Passing	Tyler Knoop	19/32, 229 yards, TD
Stony Brook	Rushing	Roland Dempster	26 carries, 98 yards, 2 TD
Stony Brook	Receiving	Jasiah Williams	7 receptions, 74 yards, TD

=== at No. 15 Rhode Island ===
Game Eleven – Albany Great Danes (3–7) at No. 15 Rhode Island Rams (8–2) – Game summary

Quarter	1	2	3	4	Total
Great Danes	10	7	0	0	17
No. 15 Rams	0	0	13	7	20

at Meade Stadium • Kingston, RI

- Date: Saturday November 16, 2024
- Game time: 1:00 PM EST
- Game weather: Sunny
- Game attendance: 4,605
- Referee: Paul Overton
- TV announcers (FloSports): TBD

Game information

First quarter

- (10:06) ALB – John Opalko 38-yard field goal (Drive: 12 plays, 37 yards, 4:48; Albany 3–0)
- (0:40) ALB – Alex Jreige 6-yard pass from Van Weber (John Opalko kick) (Drive: 17 plays, 79 yards, 7:14; Albany 10–0)

Second quarter

- (0:23) ALB – Seven McGee 25-yard pass from Van Weber (John Opalko kick) (Drive: 6 plays, 80 yards, 0:47; Albany 17–0)

Third quarter

- (13:51) URI – Malik Grant 42-yard run (Ty Groff kick) (Drive: 3 plays, 64 yards, 1:04; Albany 17–7)
- (2:44) URI – Malik Grant 1-yard run (PAT blocked) (Drive: 9 plays, 72 yards, 4:18; Albany 17–13)

Fourth quarter

- (9:36) URI – Malik Grant 7-yard run (Ty Groff kick) (Drive: 4 plays, 59 yards, 1:34; Rhode Island 20–17)

Statistics	ALB	URI
First downs	24	20
Total yards	428	371
Rushing yards	75	123
Passing yards	353	248
Passing: Comp–Att–Int	31-51-2	13-26-2
Time of possession	35:43	24:17

Team	Category	Player	Statistics
Albany	Passing	Van Weber	31/51, 353 yards, 2 TD, 2 INT
Albany	Rushing	Alex Jreige	13 carries, 62 yards
Albany	Receiving	Levi Wentz	9 receptions, 138 yards
Rhode Island	Passing	Hunter Helms	13/26, 248 yards, 2 INT
Rhode Island	Rushing	Malik Grant	25 carries, 100 yards, 3 TD
Rhode Island	Receiving	Marquis Buchanan	6 receptions, 132 yards

=== Hampton ===
Game Twelve – Hampton Pirates (5–6) vs Albany Great Danes (3–8) – Game summary

Quarter	1	2	3	4	Total
Pirates	14	14	0	6	34
Great Danes	0	7	10	25	42

at Bob Ford Field, Albany, NY

- Date: Saturday November 23, 2024
- Game time: 1:00 PM
- Game attendance: 2,341
- TV: FloSports

Game information

First quarter
Second quarter
Third quarter
Fourth quarter

Statistics	HAMP	ALB
First downs		
Total yards		
Rushing yards		
Passing yards		
Passing: Comp–Att–Int		
Time of possession		

Team	Category	Player	Statistics
Hampton	Passing		
Hampton	Rushing		
Hampton	Receiving		
Albany	Passing		
Albany	Rushing		
Albany	Receiving		

== Personnel ==
Coaching staff

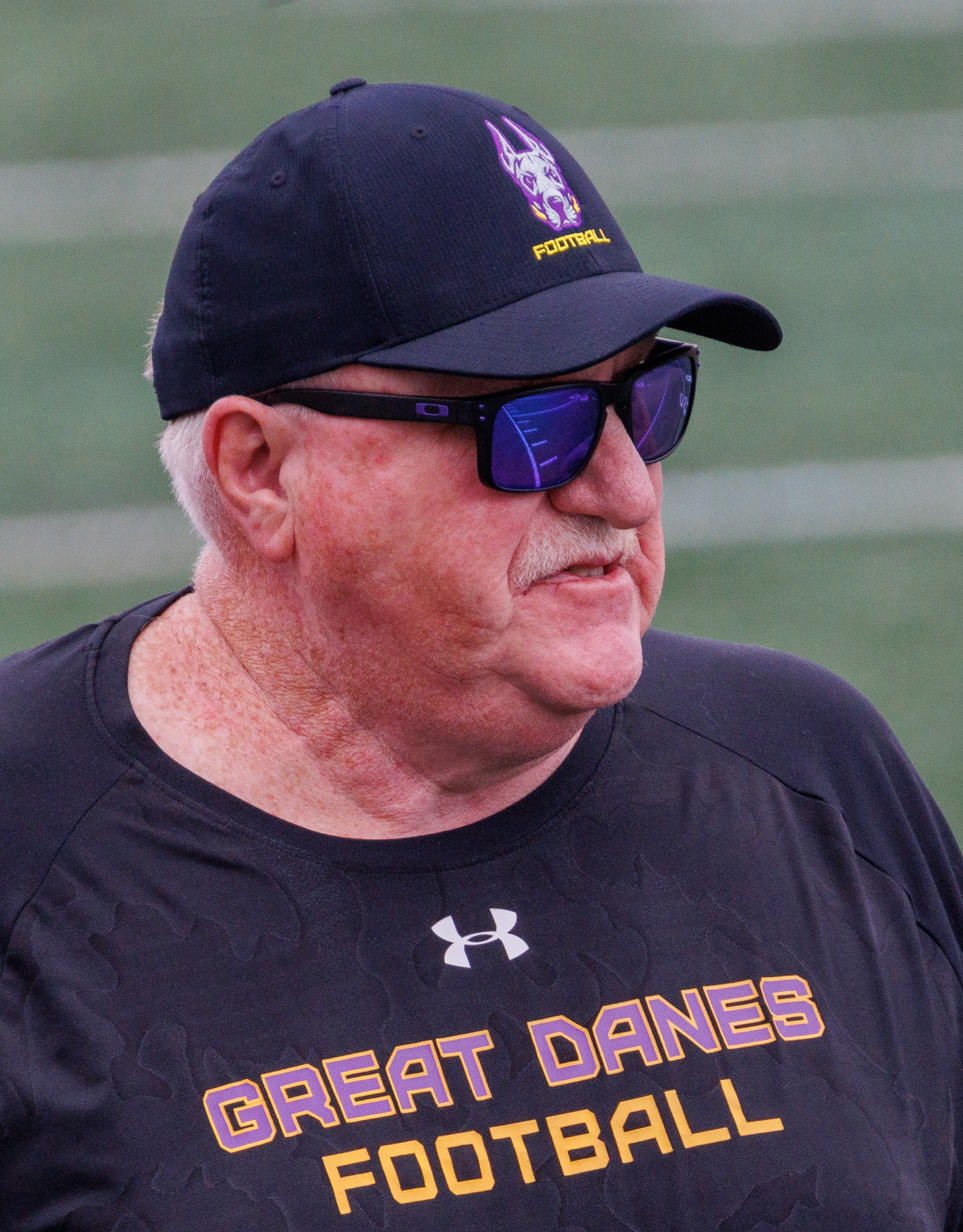
Greg Gattuso

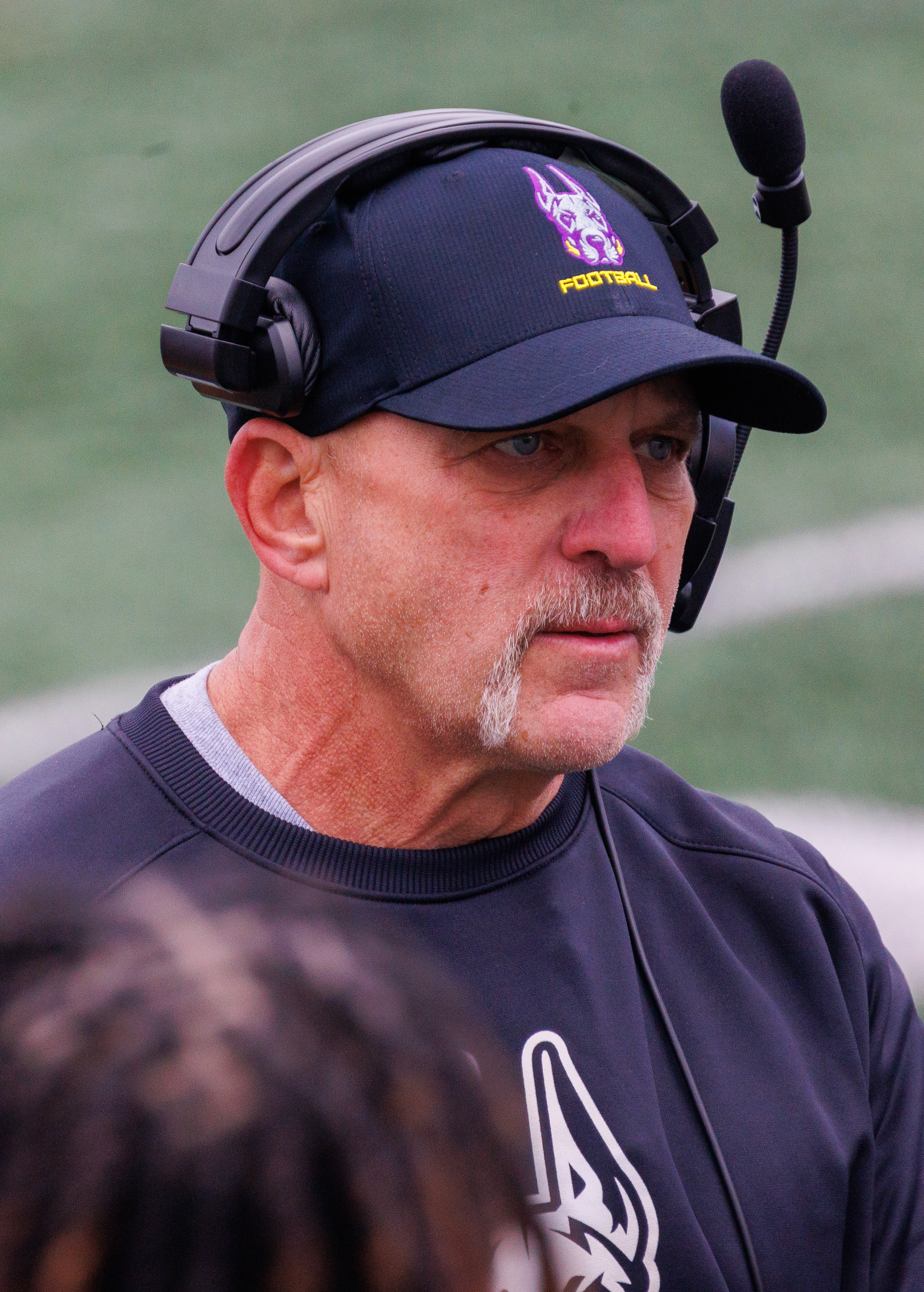
Joe Bernard

=== Coaching staff ===
Name	Position
Greg Gattuso	Head coach
Jared Ambrose	Associate head coach / offensive coordinator / quarterbacks coach
Bill Nesselt	Defensive coordinator / linebackers coach
Joe Bernard	Special teams coordinator / safeties coach
Will Fiacchi	Wide receivers coach / passing game coordinator / recruiting coordinator
Jordan Orlovsky	Running backs coach / chief of staff
Darrin Walls	Co-defensive coordinator / cornerbacks coach
Chris Calabrese	Outside linebackers coach / defensive recruiting coordinator
Mikal Myers	Defensive line coach
Jacob Alsadek	Offensive line coach
Brendan Smith	Tight ends coach
Jon Simmons	Director of football operations / video coordinator
Cameron Gibson	Defensive assistant
Triston Loomis	Offensive assistant
Tim Brady	Coaching assistant

=== Roster ===
2024 Albany Great Danes Football
Quarterbacks: 3 – Trey Lindsey – graduate student (6'0, 206); 5 – Myles Burkett – sophomore (6'0, 202); 14 – Van Weber – freshman (6'3, 183); 16 – Scott Lynch – freshman (6'2, 225); Running backs: 0 – Faysal Aden – graduate student (5'8, 214); 2 – Griffin Woodell – sophomore (5'10, 194); 9 – Landon Alexander – sophomore (6'0, 198); 22 – Joey Koch – freshman (5'10, 198); 23 – Jojo Uga – freshman (5'11, 201); 26 – Bryce Davis – freshman (5'9, 190); 32 – Alex Jreige – sophomore (5'8, 210); 36 – Akil Cham – freshman (5'7, 210); Wide receivers: 1 – Jamal Cooney – senior (5'9, 170); 4 – MarQeese Dietz – junior (5'10, 187); 7 – Seven McGee – senior (5'9, 185); 10 – Jackson Parker – junior (6'1, 197); 11 – Levi Wentz – senior (6'2, 205); 13 – Jacari Carter – graduate student (5'8, 167); 17 – Jordan Rae – freshman (5'11, 204); 19 – Caden Burti – sophomore (5'11, 189); 31 – Sam Pucci – freshman (6'2, 165); 80 – Brandon Frank – freshman (5'10, 178); 81 – Kellen Taylor – sophomore (6'2, 195); 82 – Jake Lezzer – sophomore (6'0, 197); 83 – Tavahri Groves – freshman (5'10, 167); 87 – Taden Chester – freshman (5'7, 182)	Tight ends: 6 – Aaron Steinfeldt – junior (6'4, 252); 84 – Carter Moss – sophomore (6'5, 233); 86 – Dylan Walker – junior (6'3, 249); 88 – Chad Parker – senior (6'3, 247); 89 – Riley Engelhard – junior (6'4, 243); Fullbacks: 45 – John Dodaro – sophomore (6'1, 222); Offensive linemen: 53 – Joseph Black – sophomore (6'0, 268); 58 – Chance Roberts – junior (6'3, 296); 59 – Kenneth Santos – junior (6'3, 282); 60 – Sean Dugery – sophomore (6'1, 305); 61 – Stephen Demeo – junior (6'0, 259); 62 – Sam Fallon – freshman (6'4, 310); 63 – Nate Cole – freshman (6'5, 314); 64 – Jackson Nixon – freshman (6'4, 246); 65 – Ozzie Hutchinson – graduate student (6'4, 305); 67 – Emmit Harris – sophomore (6'4, 290); 68 – Joe Hitchcock – sophomore (6'0, 267); 70 – Austin Mosier – senior (6'3, 302); 71 – Josh Gaffney – junior (6'3, 309); 72 – Will Marotta – senior (6'5, 325); 73 – Scott Houseman – graduate student (6'3, 321); 74 – Matt Aulicino – sophomore (6'5, 244); 76 – Joe McMahon – freshman (6'6, 275); 77 – Nolan Latulippe – sophomore (6'7, 281); 78 – Noah Andrewson – freshman (6'4, 334)	Defensive linemen: 6 – Chiebuka Aduaka – senior (6'1, 243); 9 – Ibrahim Sanogo – junior (6'1, 244); 11 – Marcus Winfield – graduate student (6'2, 252); 12 – Balansama Kamara – junior (6'2, 255); 44 – Sean Morris – junior (6'1, 305); 54 – Brock Boyer – sophomore (6'0, 275); 55 – Isaiah Boyd – sophomore (6'2, 289); 56 – Neco Eberhardt – sophomore (6'0, 296); 90 – Jack Iuliano – senior (6'2, 263); 91 – Brian Bordas – freshman (5'11, 231); 92 – Zakar Morris – freshman (6'1, 282); 94 – Ghassan Chehade – junior (6'5, 266); 95 – Ziah Barry – freshman (6'0, 239); 96 – Cedric Carter – senior (6'2, 250); 97 – Matthew Obiagu – junior (6'5, 241); 98 – Anthony DiMeglio – junior (6'3, 242); 99 – Dasean Dixon – junior (6'1, 293); Linebackers: 5 – Ron Holmes – senior (5'11, 230); 10 – Dontae Lunan – senior (5'10, 217); 15 – Timon Akins – graduate student (5'11, 221); 28 – Chris Gales – junior (6'0, 219); 38 – Tyree Ogarro – junior (5'10, 218); 41 – Dillon Dunathan – freshman (6'1, 229); 46 – Matthew Rappa – freshman (6'0, 213); 50 – Jacob Jones – freshman (5'11, 203); 57 – Troy Berschwinger – freshman (6'1, 226)	Defensive backs: 0 – DaeSean Winston – graduate student (6'0, 206); 1 – KC Eziomume – junior (6'1, 198); 2 – Denzel Patrick – junior (5'11, 200); 3 – Brad Igweike – senior (5'8, 177); 4 – Daiyaan Hawkins – senior (5'10, 190); 6 – Myles Bell – graduate student (6'0, 172); 7 – Thomas Joe-Kamara – senior (6'0, 208); 13 – Mike Coleman – graduate student (5'10, 160); 14 – Kevon Angry – senior (5'9, 178); 18 – James Weaver – senior (6'1, 201); 20 – Donny Jones – freshman (5'8, 170); 21 – Erv Wiggins Jr. – freshman (5'8, 176); 24 – Cam Stodghill – freshman (6'2, 190); 25 – Jaydon Williams – freshman (5'8, 180); 27 – Tyler Merwarth – junior (5'11, 199); 29 – Parris Smiley – sophomore (5'11, 197); 30 – Nick Totten – sophomore (5'11, 193); 35 – Omar Jackson – freshman (5'8, 160); Placekickers: 37 – John Opalko – graduate student (5'11, 180); 39 – Steven Sadek – freshman (5'11, 156); 42 – Owen Lawson – freshman (6'0, 178); 43 – Dove Eitzen – freshman (5'10, 172); 69 – James Bozek – junior (6'2, 199); Long snapper: 47 – Russell Dietz – junior (5'10, 231); 51 – Clayton Ritter – junior (5'10, 238)
Source and player details, 2024 Albany Great Danes (1/22/2025):
