= 2024 West Virginia Mountaineers football team =

American college football season

2024 West Virginia Mountaineers football

Frisco Bowl, L 37–42 vs. Memphis
- Conference: Big 12 Conference
- Record: 6–7 (5–4 Big 12)
- Head coach: Neal Brown (6th season; regular season); Chad Scott (interim; bowl game)
- Offensive coordinator: Chad Scott (2nd season)
- Offensive scheme: Spread option
- Defensive coordinator: Jordan Lesley (5th season; first 8 games)
- Co-defensive coordinators: ShaDon Brown (4th season); Jeff Koonz (interim; after week 9)
- Base defense: Multiple
- Home stadium: Milan Puskar Stadium

2024 Big 12 Conference football standings
	Conf.			Overall
Team	W		L	W		L
No. 7 Arizona State y$^	7	–	2	11	–	3
No. 15 Iowa State y	7	–	2	11	–	3
No. 13 BYU	7	–	2	11	–	2
No. 25 Colorado	7	–	2	9	–	4
Baylor	6	–	3	8	–	5
TCU	6	–	3	9	–	4
Texas Tech	6	–	3	8	–	5
Kansas State	5	–	4	9	–	4
West Virginia	5	–	4	6	–	7
Kansas	4	–	5	5	–	7
Cincinnati	3	–	6	5	–	7
Houston	3	–	6	4	–	8
Utah	2	–	7	5	–	7
UCF	2	–	7	4	–	8
Arizona	2	–	7	4	–	8
Oklahoma State	0	–	9	3	–	9
Championship: Arizona State 45, Iowa State 19
^ – College Football Playoff participant; $ – Conference champion; y – Championship game participant; Rankings from AP Poll

The 2024 West Virginia Mountaineers football team represented West Virginia University as a member of the Big 12 Conference during the 2024 NCAA Division I FBS football season. The Mountaineers played their home games at Milan Puskar Stadium located in Morgantown, West Virginia.

Head coach Neal Brown was fired on December 1, a day after a blowout loss to Texas Tech in the team's regular season finale. He finished at WVU with an overall record of 37–35 through six seasons. Offensive coordinator Chad Scott was named the Mountaineers' interim head coach.

== Offseason ==
=== Transfers ===
==== Outgoing ====
Player	Position	Destination
Graeson Malashevich	WR	Valdosta State
Brayden Dudley	EDGE	Mercer
Montre Miller	CB	Mississippi State
Sean Boyle	QB	Unknown
EJ Horton	WR	FAU
Charlie Katarincic	IOL	Unknown
Tirek Austin-Cave	LB	New Mexico
Luke Hamilton	RB	Unknown
Tomiwa Durojaiye	DL	Florida State
Jared Bartlett	T	Cincinnati
Keyshawn Cobb	S	Nevada
DJ Cotton Jr	DL	James Madison
Lance Dixon	S	Toledo
Justin Johnson Jr	RB	Unknown
James Heard	EDGE	Syracuse
Mike Lockhart	DL	SMU
Danny King	K	Southern Utah
Hershey McLaurin	S	Houston
Andrew Wilson-Lamp	CB	East Carolina
Ja'Shaun Poke	WR	San Diego State
Davis Mallinger	S	Nevada
Christion Stokes	S	Findlay
Theo Grabill	WR	Garden City CC
Jeremiah Aaron	WR	North Texas
Cortez Braham	WR	Nevada

==== Incoming ====
Player	Position	Previous school
Ryder Burton	QB	BYU
Dontez Fagan	CB	Charlotte
Justin Robinson	WR	Mississippi State
Kekoura Tarnue	CB	Jacksonville State
Garnet Hollis Jr.	CB	Northwestern
Jaheem Joseph	CB	Northwestern
T.J. Jackson	DL	Troy
Xavier Bausley	OT	Jacksonville State
Jaden Bray	WR	Oklahoma State
Ty French	EDGE	Gardner-Webb
Ayden Garnes	CB	Duquesne
TJ Crandall	CB	Colorado State
Reid Carrico	LB	Ohio State

== Preseason ==
=== Big 12 media poll ===
The preseason poll was released on July 2, 2024.

Big 12
Predicted finish	Team	Votes (1st place)
1	Utah	906 (20)
2	Kansas State	889 (19)
3	Oklahoma State	829 (14)
4	Kansas	772 (5)
5	Arizona	762 (3)
6	Iowa State	661
7	West Virginia	581
8	UCF	551
9	Texas Tech	532
10	TCU	436
11	Colorado	400
12	Baylor	268
13	BYU	215
14	Cincinnati	196
15	Houston	157
16	Arizona State	141

- First place votes in ()

== Schedule ==
Date	Time	Opponent	Site	TV	Result	Attendance
August 31	12:00 p.m.	No. 8 Penn State*	Milan Puskar Stadium; Morgantown, WV (rivalry, Big Noon Kickoff, Stripe the Stadium)	FOX	L 12–34	62,084
September 7	6:00 p.m.	No. 16 (FCS) Albany*	Milan Puskar Stadium; Morgantown, WV (Gold Rush)	ESPN+	W 49–14	50,073
September 14	3:30 p.m.	at Pittsburgh*	Acrisure Stadium; Pittsburgh, PA (Backyard Brawl)	ESPN2	L 34–38	66,087
September 21	12:00 p.m.	Kansas	Milan Puskar Stadium; Morgantown, WV	ESPN2	W 32–28	52,428
October 5	4:00 p.m.	at Oklahoma State	Boone Pickens Stadium; Stillwater, OK	ESPN2	W 38–14	52,202
October 12	8:00 p.m.	No. T–11 Iowa State	Milan Puskar Stadium; Morgantown, WV	FOX	L 16–28	55,202
October 19	7:30 p.m.	No. 17 Kansas State^{†}	Milan Puskar Stadium; Morgantown, WV	FOX	L 18–45	54,327
October 26	7:00 p.m.	at Arizona	Arizona Stadium; Tucson, AZ	FS1	W 31–26	49,888
November 9	12:00 p.m.	at Cincinnati	Nippert Stadium; Cincinnati, OH (rivalry)	FS1	W 31–24	38,007
November 16	4:00 p.m.	Baylor	Milan Puskar Stadium; Morgantown, WV	ESPN2	L 35–49	52,376
November 23	3:30 p.m.	UCF	Milan Puskar Stadium; Morgantown, WV (True Blue)	ESPNU	W 31–21	40,722
November 30	12:00 p.m.	at Texas Tech	Jones AT&T Stadium; Lubbock, TX	FS1	L 15–52	52,785
December 17	9:00 p.m.	vs. No. 25 Memphis*	Toyota Stadium; Frisco, TX (Frisco Bowl)	ESPN	L 37–42	12,022
*Non-conference game; ^{†}Homecoming; Rankings from AP Poll (and CFP Rankings, after October 30) - Released prior to game; All times are in Eastern time

== Game summaries ==
=== vs No. 8 Penn State (rivalry) ===
No. 8 Penn State Nittany Lions (0–0) vs West Virginia Mountaineers (0–0) – Game summary

Quarter	1	2	3	4	Total
No. 8 Nittany Lions	0	20	7	7	34
Mountaineers	0	6	0	6	12

at Milan Puskar Stadium • Morgantown, WV

- Date: August 31, 2024
- Game time: 12:00 pm
- Game weather: 87 °F (31 °C)
- Game attendance: 62,084
- Referee: David Alvarez
- TV announcers (FOX): Gus Johnson (play-by-play), Joel Klatt (analyst), and Jenny Taft (sideline)

Game information

First quarter

No scoring

Second quarter

- PSU – Harrison Wallace III, 50-yard TD pass from Drew Allar, two-point conversion pass incomplete, 14:53 (PSU 6–0)
- PSU – Kaytron Allen, 20-yard TD pass from Allar, Sander Sahaydak kick, 9:46 (PSU 13–0)
- WVU – Michael Hayes II, 38-yard field goal, 6:15 (PSU 13–3)
- WVU – Hayes, 39-yard field goal, 0:37 (PSU 13–6)
- PSU – Wallace, 18-yard TD pass from Allar, Sahaydak kick, 0:06 (PSU 20–6)

Third quarter

- PSU – Nicholas Singleton, 40-yard TD run, Sahaydak kick, 10:16 (PSU 27–6)

Fourth quarter

- WVU – CJ Donaldson Jr, 1-yard TD run, two-point conversion failed, 12:49 (PSU 27–12)
- PSU – Tyler Warren, 19-yard TD pass from Beau Pribula, Sahaydak kick, 9:00 (PSU 34–12)

Statistics	PSU	WVU
First downs	21	19
Total yards	457	246
Rushing yards	222	85
Passing yards	235	161
Passing: Comp–Att–Int	12–18–0	15–28–1
Time of possession	30:25	29:35

Team	Category	Player	Statistics
Penn State	Passing	Drew Allar	11/17, 216 yards, 3 TD
Penn State	Rushing	Nicholas Singleton	13 carries, 114 yards, 1 TD
Penn State	Receiving	Harrison Wallace III	5 receptions, 117 yards, 2 TD
West Virginia	Passing	Garrett Greene	15/28, 161 yards
West Virginia	Rushing	C.J. Donaldson Jr.	12 carries, 42 yards, 1 TD
West Virginia	Receiving	Preston Fox	2 receptions, 41 yards

=== vs No. 16 (FCS) Albany ===
No. 16 (FCS) Albany Great Danes (1–0) vs West Virginia Mountaineers (0–1) – Game summary

Quarter	1	2	3	4	Total
No. 16 (FCS) Great Danes	0	14	0	0	14
Mountaineers	14	14	14	7	49

at Milan Puskar Stadium • Morgantown, WV

- Date: September 7, 2024
- Game time: 6:00 pm
- Game weather: 68 °F (20 °C)
- Game attendance: 50,073
- TV announcers (ESPN+): Richard Cross (play-by-play) and Barrett Brooks (analyst)

Game information

First quarter

- WVU – Jahiem White, 14-yard TD run, Michael Hayes II kick, 9:34 (WVU 7-0)
- WVU – Justin Robinson, 12-yard TD pass from Garrett Greene, Hayes II kick, 5:41 (WVU 14-0)

Second quarter

- WVU – Kole Taylor, 39-yard TD pass from Greene, Hayes II kick, 14:49 (WVU 21-0)
- UAlbany – Griffin Woodell, 7-yard TD run, John Opalko kick, 4:40 (WVU 21-7)
- UAlbany – Jacari Carter, 33-yard TD pass from Myles Burkett, Opalko kick, 1:54 (WVU 21-14)
- WVU – Greene, 40-yard TD run, Hayes II kick, 0:39 (WVU 28-14)

Third quarter

- WVU – Hudson Clement, 10-yard TD pass from Greene, Hayes II kick, 5:22 (WVU 35-14)
- WVU - C.J. Donaldson Jr., 2-yard TD run, Hayes II kick, 0:49 (WVU 42-14)

Fourth quarter

- WVU - Nicco Marchiol, 12-yard TD run, RJ Kocan Kick, 7:22 (WVU 49-14)

Statistics	ALB	WVU
First downs	21	31
Total yards	374	553
Rushing yards	68	305
Passing yards	306	248
Passing: Comp–Att–Int	18–39–0	20–26–0
Time of possession	35:18	24:42

Team	Category	Player	Statistics
Albany	Passing	Myles Burkett	18/39, 306 yards, 1 TD
Albany	Rushing	Jojo Uga	9 carries, 57 yards
Albany	Receiving	Seven McGee	4 receptions, 90 yards
West Virginia	Passing	Garrett Greene	17/23, 236 yards, 3 TD
West Virginia	Rushing	C.J. Donaldson Jr.	14 carries, 125 yards, 1 TD
West Virginia	Receiving	Kole Taylor	3 receptions, 47 yards, 1 TD

=== at Pittsburgh (Backyard Brawl) ===
West Virginia Mountaineers (1–1) at Pittsburgh Panthers (2–0) – Game summary

Quarter	1	2	3	4	Total
Mountaineers	7	10	7	10	34
Panthers	10	7	7	14	38

at Acrisure Stadium • Pittsburgh, PA

- Date: September 14, 2024
- Game time: 3:30 pm
- Game weather: Sunny • Temperature: 85 °F (29 °C) • Wind: E 9 mph
- Game attendance: 66,087
- Referee: Michael VanderVelde
- TV announcers (ESPN2): Mike Monaco (play-by-play), Kirk Morrison (analyst), and Dawn Davenport (sideline reporter)

Game information

First quarter

- WVU – CJ Donaldson Jr, 10-yard TD pass from Garrett Greene, Michael Hayes II kick, 7:58 (WVU 7-0)
- PITT – Ben Sauls 31-yard field goal, 6:17 (WVU 7-3)
- PITT – Desmond Reid, 9-yard TD pass from Eli Holstein, Sauls kick, 0:30 (PITT 10-7)

Second quarter

- WVU – Jahiem White, 5-yard TD run, Hayes II kick, 11:54 (WVU 14-10)
- PITT – Desmond Reid, 19-yard TD pass from Holstein, Sauls kick, 7:01 (PITT 17-14)
- WVU – Hayes II, 44-yard field goal, 0:21 (Tied 17-17)

Third quarter

- PITT – Brandon George, 24-yard TD return of blocked punt, Sauls kick, 8:27 (PITT 24-17)
- WVU – Donaldson Jr., 4-yard TD run, Hayes II kick, 4:54 (Tied 24-24)

Fourth quarter

- WVU – Hayes II, 23-yard field goal, 11:19 (WVU 27-24)
- WVU - Justin Robinson, 28-yard TD pass from Greene, Hayes II kick, 4:55 (WVU 34-24)
- PITT – Daejon Reynolds, 40-yard TD pass from Holstein, Sauls kick, 3:06 (WVU 34-31)
- PITT – Derrick Davis Jr., 1-yard TD run, Sauls kick, 0:32 (PITT 38-34)

Statistics	WVU	PITT
First downs	22	24
Total yards	398	379
Rushing yards	188	78
Passing yards	210	301
Passing: Comp–Att–Int	16-30-2	21-30-0
Time of possession	31:08	28:52

Team	Category	Player	Statistics
West Virginia	Passing	Garrett Greene	16/30, 210 yards, 2 TD, 2 INT
West Virginia	Rushing	C.J. Donaldson Jr.	19 carries, 79 yards, 1 TD
West Virginia	Receiving	Jaden Bray	1 reception, 44 yards
Pittsburgh	Passing	Eli Holstein	21/30, 301 yards, 3 TD
Pittsburgh	Rushing	Eli Holstein	14 carries, 59 yards
Pittsburgh	Receiving	Kenny Johnson	5 receptions, 79 yards

=== vs Kansas ===
Kansas Jayhawks (1–2) vs West Virginia Mountaineers (1–2) – Game summary

Quarter	1	2	3	4	Total
Jayhawks	0	7	14	7	28
Mountaineers	7	7	3	15	32

at Milan Puskar Stadium • Morgantown, WV

- Date: September 21, 2024
- Game time: 12:00 p.m.
- Game weather: Cloudy • Temperature: 80 °F (27 °C) • Wind: SW 6 mph
- Game attendance: 52,428
- Referee: Kevin Mar
- TV announcers (ESPN2): Brian Custer (play-by-play), Rod Gilmore (analyst), and Lauren Sisler (sideline)

Game information
First quarter
- (5:16) WVU – Jahiem White 1-yard run, Michael Hayes II kick (Drive: 3 plays, 78 yards, 1:10; West Virginia 7–0.)

Second quarter

- (7:31) KAN – Devin Neal 11-yard run, Tabor Allen kick (Drive: 13 plays, 83 yards, 6:16; Tied 7–7.)
- (0:25) WVU – Garrett Greene 5-yard run, Michael Hayes II kick (Drive: 8 plays, 34 yards, 1:17; West Virginia 14–7.)

Third quarter

- (9:08) KAN – Luke Grimm 7-yard pass from Jalon Daniels, Tabor Allen kick (Drive: 10 plays, 75 yards, 5:52; Tied 14–14.)
- (7:03) WVU – Michael Hayes II 40-yard field goal (Drive: 5 plays, 53 yards, 2:05; West Virginia 17–14.)
- (4:30) KAN – Daniel Hishaw 11-yard run, Tabor Allen kick (Drive: 5 plays, 75 yards, 2:33; Kansas 21–17.)

Fourth quarter

- (5:39) KAN – Luke Grimm 32-yard run, Tabor Allen kick (Drive: 6 plays, 54 yards, 3:40; Kansas 28–17.)
- (3:27) WVU – Kole Taylor 8-yard pass from Garrett Greene, Kole Taylor pass (Drive: 9 plays, 75 yards, 2:12; Kansas 28–25.)
- (0:26) WVU – Rodney Gallagher III 15-yard pass from Garrett Greene, Michael Hayes II kick (Drive: 7 plays, 67 yards, 1:56; West Virginia 32–28.)

Statistics	KU	WVU
First downs	25	23
Total yards	72–431	63–443
Rushing yards	47–247	33–148
Passing yards	184	295
Passing: Comp–Att–Int	15–25–1	15–30–2
Time of possession	36:47	23:13

Team	Category	Player	Statistics
Kansas	Passing	Jalon Daniels	15/25, 184 yds, TD, INT
Kansas	Rushing	Devin Neal	27 rushes, 110 yds, TD
Kansas	Receiving	Luke Grimm	6 receptions, 75 yds, TD
West Virginia	Passing	Garrett Greene	15/30, 295 yds, 2 TD, 2 INT
West Virginia	Rushing	Garrett Greene	17 rushes, 87 yds, TD
West Virginia	Receiving	Hudson Clement	7 receptions, 150 yds

=== at Oklahoma State ===
West Virginia Mountaineers (2–2) at Oklahoma State Cowboys (3–2) – Game summary

Quarter	1	2	3	4	Total
Mountaineers	10	21	0	7	38
Cowboys	0	7	0	7	14

at Boone Pickens Stadium • Stillwater, OK

- Date: October 5, 2024
- Game time: 4:00 p.m.
- Game weather: Sunny • Temperature: 93 °F (34 °C) • Wind: S at 12 miles per hour (19 km/h)
- Game attendance: 52,202
- Referee: Mike McCabe
- TV announcers (ESPN2): Mike Monaco (play-by-play), Kirk Morrison (analyst), and Dawn Davenport (sideline)

Game information

First quarter

- WVU – Michael Hayes II, 39-yard field goal, 9:20 (WVU 3-0)
- WVU – Traylon Ray, 10-yard TD pass from Nicco Marchiol, Hayes II kick, 0:55 (WVU 10-0)

Second quarter

- WVU – Jahiem White, 10-yard TD run, Hayes II kick, 11:16 (WVU 17-0)
- WVU – Garrett Greene, 15-yard TD run, Hayes II kick, 5:55 (WVU 24-0)
- OKST – Rashod Owens, 8-yard TD pass from Alan Bowman, Logan Ward kick, 1:54 (WVU 24-7)
- WVU – CJ Donaldson Jr, 15-yard TD run, Hayes II kick, 0:28 (WVU 31-7)

Third quarter

No Scoring

Fourth quarter

- WVU – CJ Donaldson Jr., 1-yard TD run, Hayes II kick, 9:01 (WVU 38-7)
- OKST – De'Zhaun Stribling, 43-yard TD pass from Garret Rangel, Ward kick, (WVU 38-14)

Statistics	WVU	OKST
First downs	31	11
Total yards	558	227
Rushing yards	389	36
Passing yards	169	191
Passing: Comp–Att–Int	10-16-0	14-24-2
Time of possession	42:40	17:20

Team	Category	Player	Statistics
West Virginia	Passing	Garrett Greene	9/15, 159 yards
West Virginia	Rushing	Jahiem White	19 carries, 158 yards, 1 TD
West Virginia	Receiving	Hudson Clement	3 receptions, 64 yards
Oklahoma State	Passing	Alan Bowman	10/19, 116 yards, 1 TD, 2 INT
Oklahoma State	Rushing	Ollie Gordon II	13 carries, 50 yards
Oklahoma State	Receiving	Da'Wain Lofton	3 receptions, 73 yards

=== vs No. 11т Iowa State ===
No. 11т Iowa State Cyclones (5–0) vs West Virginia Mountaineers (3–2) – Game summary

Quarter	1	2	3	4	Total
No. 11т Cyclones	0	14	0	14	28
Mountaineers	7	3	0	6	16

at Milan Puskar Stadium • Morgantown, WV

- Date: October 12, 2024
- Game time: 8:00 p.m.
- Game weather: Clear • Temperature: 62 °F (17 °C) • Wind: SW 4 miles per hour (6.4 km/h)
- Game attendance: 55,202
- Referee: Cravonne Barrett
- TV announcers (FOX): Tim Brando (play-by-play), Devin Gardner (analyst), and Josh Sims (sideline)

Game information

First quarter

- (7:18) WVU – Jaheim White 8 Yd Run (Michael Hayes II Kick) (Drive: 14 plays, 75 yards, 7:42; WVU 7–0)

Second quarter

- (13:05) ISU – Jaylin Noel 60 Yd Pass from Rocco Becht (Kyle Konrardy Kick) (Drive: 3 plays, 80 yards, 0:58; Tied 7–7)
- (2:39) ISU – Carson Hansen 11 Yd Run (Kyle Konrardy Kick) (Drive: 17 plays, 91 yards, 8:08; ISU 14–7)
- (0:32) WVU – Michael Hayes II 43 Yd Field Goal (Drive: 10 plays, 50 yards, 2:07; ISU 14–10)

Third quarter

No scoring plays

Fourth quarter

- (11:57) ISU – Carson Hansen 3 Yd Run (Kyle Konrardy Kick) (Drive: 10 plays, 65 yards, 5:03; ISU 21–10)
- (4:42) ISU – Carson Hansen 2 Yd Run (Kyle Konrardy Kick) (Drive: 10 plays, 33 yards, 6:43; ISU 28–10)
- (1:10) WVU – Jaheim White 10 Yd Pass from Garrett Greene (Two-Point Pass Conversion Failed) (Drive: 11 plays, 67 yards, 3:25; ISU 28–16)

Statistics	ISU	WVU
First downs	24	23
Total yards	395	356
Rushing yards	130	150
Passing yards	265	206
Passing: Comp–Att–Int	18–26–0	18–32–2
Time of possession	33:03	26:57

Team	Category	Player	Statistics
Iowa State	Passing	Rocco Becht	18/26, 265 yards, TD
Iowa State	Rushing	Carson Hansen	20 carries, 96 yards, 3 TD
Iowa State	Receiving	Jayden Higgins	6 receptions, 102 yards
West Virginia	Passing	Garrett Greene	18/32, 206 yards, TD, 2 INT
West Virginia	Rushing	Garrett Greene	10 carries, 87 yards
West Virginia	Receiving	Kole Taylor	5 receptions, 55 yards

=== vs No. 17 Kansas State ===
No. 17 Kansas State Wildcats (5–1) vs West Virginia Mountaineers (3–3) – Game summary

Quarter	1	2	3	4	Total
No. 17 Wildcats	10	7	14	14	45
Mountaineers	3	7	0	8	18

at Milan Puskar Stadium • Morgantown, WV

- Date: October 19, 2024
- Game time: 7:30 p.m.
- Game weather: Clear • Temperature: 56 °F (13 °C) • Wind: NE at 2 miles per hour (3.2 km/h)
- Game attendance: 54,327
- Referee: Michael VanderVelde
- TV announcers (FOX): Connor Onion (play-by-play), Mark Helfrich (analyst), and Josh Sims (sideline)

Game information

First quarter

- (03:03) KSU – Chris Tennant, 44-yard field goal, (Drive: 10 plays, 37 yards, 05:16; KSU 3-0)
- (00:52) WVU – Michael Hayes II, 44-yard field goal, (Drive: 6 plays, 49 yards, 02:11; Tied 3-3)
- (00:21) KSU – Jadon Jackson, 60-yard TD pass from Avery Johnson, Tennant kick, (Drive: 2 plays, 84 yards, 0:26; KSU 10-3)

Second quarter

- (13:14) KSU – Marques Sigle, 43-yard interception return for TD, Tennant Kick, (KSU 17-3)
- (06:38) WVU – Hudson Clement, 7-yard TD pass from Garrett Greene, Hayes II kick, (Drive: 13 plays, 70 yards, 06:29; KSU 17-10)

Third quarter

- (09:38) KSU – Garrett Oakley, 16-yard TD pass from Johnson, Tennant kick, (Drive: 11 plays, 74 yards, 05:17; KSU 24-10)
- (04:48) KSU – Will Anciaux, 1-yard TD pass from Johnson, Tennant kick, (Drive: 7 plays, 69 yards, 03:17; KSU 31-10)

Fourth quarter

- (12:09) KSU – DJ Giddens, 1-yard TD run, Tennant kick, (Drive: 10 plays, 63 yards, 03:36; KSU 38-10)
- (08:22) WVU – Traylon Ray, 12-yard TD pass from Nicco Marchiol, Kole Taylor pass, (Drive: 7 plays, 69 yards, 03:41, KSU 38-18)
- (05:51) KSU – DJ Giddens, 18-yard TD run, Tennant kick, (Drive: 2 plays, 25 yards, 00:49, KSU 45-18)

Statistics	KSU	WVU
First downs	19	20
Total yards	412	295
Rushing yards	114	152
Passing yards	298	143
Passing: Comp–Att–Int	19-29-0	15-32-2
Time of possession	25:38	34:22

Team	Category	Player	Statistics
Kansas State	Passing	Avery Johnson	19/29, 298 yards, 3 TD
Kansas State	Rushing	DJ Giddens	19 carries, 57 yards, 2 TD
Kansas State	Receiving	Jadon Jackson	2 receptions, 84 yards, 1 TD
West Virginia	Passing	Garrett Greene	9/19, 85 yards, 1 TD, 2 INT
West Virginia	Rushing	Garrett Greene	11 carries, 89 yards
West Virginia	Receiving	Kole Taylor	4 receptions, 61 yards

=== at Arizona ===
West Virginia Mountaineers (3–4) at Arizona Wildcats (3–4) – Game summary

Quarter	1	2	3	4	Total
Mountaineers	10	7	7	7	31
Wildcats	0	7	6	13	26

at Arizona Stadium • Tucson, AZ

- Date: October 26, 2024
- Game time: 7:00 p.m.
- Game weather: Sunny • Temperature: 97 °F (36 °C)
- Game attendance: 49,888
- Referee: Kevin Mar
- TV announcers (FS1): Alex Faust (play-by-play) and Robert Smith (analyst)

Game information

First quarter

- (08:09) WVU – Michael Hayes II, 45-yard field goal, (Drive: 12 plays, 48 yards, 06:51; WVU 3-0)
- (00:31) WVU – Leighton Bechdel, 14-yard TD run, Hayes II kick, (Drive: 10 plays, 81 yards, 05:51; WVU 10-0)

Second quarter

- (07:34) ARIZ – Quali Conley, 1-yard TD run, Tyler Loop kick, (Drive: 14 plays, 75 yards, 07:57; WVU 10-7)
- (02:55) WVU – Hudson Clement, 3-yard TD pass from Nicco Marchiol, Hayes II kick, (Drive: 8 plays, 75 yards, 04:39; WVU 17-7)

Third quarter

- (07:59) WVU – CJ Donaldson Jr, 20-yard TD run, Hayes II kick, (Drive: 8 plays, 44 yards, 04:54; WVU 24-7)
- (01:18) ARIZ – Sam Olson, 23-yard TD pass from Noah Fifita, PAT unsuccessful, (Drive: 6 plays, 65 yards, 02:24; WVU 24-13)

Fourth quarter

- (13:31) WVU – Traylon Ray, 54-yard TD pass from Marchiol, Hayes II kick, (Drive: 5 plays, 75 yards, 02:47; WVU 31-13)
- (08:52) ARIZ – Tetairoa McMillan, 34-yard TD pass from Fifita, 2-point attempt unsuccessful, (Drive: 13 plays, 75 yards, 04:39; WVU 31-19)
- (04:35) ARIZ – Noah Fifita, 3-yard TD run, Loop Kick, (Drive: 6 plays, 71 yards, 01:27; WVU 31-26)

Statistics	WVU	ARIZ
First downs	16	18
Total yards	405	386
Rushing yards	207	78
Passing yards	198	308
Passing: Comp–Att–Int	18-22-0	22-34-0
Time of possession	35:04	24:56

Team	Category	Player	Statistics
West Virginia	Passing	Nicco Marchiol	18/22, 198 yards, 2 TD
West Virginia	Rushing	Jahiem White	12 carries, 92 yards
West Virginia	Receiving	Traylon Ray	2 receptions, 78 yards, 1 TD
Arizona	Passing	Noah Fifita	21/32, 294 yards, 2 TD
Arizona	Rushing	Quali Conley	16 carries, 72 yards, 1 TD
Arizona	Receiving	Tetairoa McMillan	10 receptions, 202 yards, 1 TD

=== at Cincinnati (rivalry) ===
West Virginia Mountaineers (4–4) at Cincinnati Bearcats (5–3) – Game summary

Quarter	1	2	3	4	Total
Mountaineers	0	17	7	7	31
Bearcats	7	0	7	10	24

at Nippert Stadium • Cincinnati

- Date: November 9, 2024
- Game time: 12:00 p.m.
- Game weather: Sunny • Temperature: 58 °F (14 °C) • Wind: E at 10 miles per hour (16 km/h)
- Game attendance: 38,007
- Referee: Kevin Boitmann
- TV announcers (FS1): Chris Myers (play-by-play) and Robert Smith (analyst)
- Recap

Game information

First quarter

- (5:17) CIN – Corey Kiner 2-yard run, Nathan Hawks kick (Drive: 13 plays, 68 yards, 6:04; Cincinnati 7–0)

Second quarter

- (12:31) WVU – Anthony Wilson Jr. 79-yard Interception Return, Michael Hayes II kick; Tied 7–7)
- (8:48) WVU – Michael Haey II 24-yard field goal (Drive: 5 plays, 31 yards, 2:27; West Virginia 10-7)
- (3:37) WVU – Justin Robinson 10-yard pass from Nicco Marchiol, Michael Hayes II kick (Drive: 3 plays, 41 yards, 1:08; West Virginia 17–74)

Third quarter

- (8:29) WVU – Nicco Marchiol 10-yard run, Michael Hayes II kick (Drive: 6 plays, 51 yards, 3:42; West Virginia 24–7)
- (3:51) CIN – Evan Pryor 80-yard pass from Brendan Sorsby, Nathan Hawks kick (Drive: 1 plays, 80 yards, 0:13; West Virginia 24-14)

Fourth quarter

- (9:20) CIN – Brendan Sorsby 12-yard run, Nathan Hawks kick (Drive: 11 plays, 71 yards, 5:19; Cincinnati 24–21)
- (3:51) WVU – Tyrin Bradley Jr. 14-yard Recovery, Michael Hayes II kick; West Virginia 31-21)
- (1:39) CIN – Nathan Hawks 29-yard field goal (Drive: 14 plays, 64 yards, 2:54; West Virginia 31-24)

Statistics	WVU	CIN
First downs	10	24
Total yards	238	436
Rushing yards	92	157
Passing yards	156	279
Passing: Comp–Att–Int	9-15-1	25-36-1
Time of possession	25:04	34:56

Team	Category	Player	Statistics
West Virginia	Passing	Nicco Marchiol	9/15, 156 yards, 1 TD, 1 INT
West Virginia	Rushing	Jahiem White	13 carries, 67 yards
West Virginia	Receiving	Justin Robinson	2 receptions, 60 yards, 1 TD
Cincinnati	Passing	Brendan Sorsby	25/36, 279 yards, 1 TD, 1 INT
Cincinnati	Rushing	Corey Kiner	25 carries, 94 yards, 1 TD
Cincinnati	Receiving	Evan Pryor	5 receptions, 100 yards, 1 TD

=== vs Baylor ===
Baylor Bears (5–4) vs West Virginia Mountaineers (5–4) – Game summary

Quarter	1	2	3	4	Total
Bears	14	21	0	14	49
Mountaineers	7	21	0	7	35

at Milan Puskar Stadium • Morgantown, WV

- Date: November 16, 2024
- Game time: 4:00 p.m.
- Game weather: Cloudy, 51 °F (11 °C), NW 4 mph
- Game attendance: 52,306
- Referee: Luke Richmond
- TV announcers (ESPN2): Mike Monaco (play-by-play), Kirk Morrison (analyst), and Dawn Davenport (sideline)

Game information

First quarter

- (9:34) WVU – Garrett Greene 3-yard run (Michael Hayes II Kick) Mountaineers 7–0. Drive: 12 plays, 79 yards, 5:23.
- (7:10) BAY – Bryson Washington 22-yard pass from Sawyer Robertson (Isaiah Hankins Kick) Tied 7-7. Drive: 7 plays, 75 yards, 2:24.
- (3:07) BAY – Josh Cameron 43-yard pass from Sawyer Robertson (Isaiah Hankins Kick) Bears 14–7. Drive: 6 plays, 80 yards, 2:22.

Second quarter

- (13:04) WVU – Traylon Ray 9-yard pass from Garrett Greene (Michael Hayes II Kick) Tied 14-14. Drive: 12 plays, 85 yards, 4:58.
- (4:22) BAY – Monaray Baldwin 40-yard pass from Sawyer Robertson (Isaiah Hankins Kick) Bears 21–14. Drive: 5 plays, 65 yards, 2:02.
- (2:13) BAY – Bryson Washington 51-yard run (Isaiah Hankins Kick) Bears 28–14. Drive: 2 plays, 51 yards, 0:13.
- (1:47) WVU – CJ Donaldson Jr. 23-yard run (Michael Hayes II Kick) Bears 28–21. Drive: 3 plays, 41 yards, 0:26.
- (0:47) BAY – Bryson Washington 8-yard run (Isaiah Hankins Kick) Bears 35–21. Drive: 7 plays, 55 yards, 0:52.
- (0:00) WVU – Garrett Greene 1-yard run (Michael Hayes II Kick) Bears 35–28. Drive: 8 plays, 75 yards, 0:47.

Third quarter

No scoring plays

Fourth quarter

- (8:07) BAY – Bryson Washington 9-yard run (Isaiah Hankins Kick) Bears 42–28. Drive: 10 plays, 65 yards, 4:02.
- (3:24) BAY – Dawson Pendergrass 15-yard run (Isaiah Hankins Kick) Bears 49–28. Drive: 8 plays, 47 yards, 3:42.
- (0:55) WVU – Kole Taylor 11-yard pass from Garrett Greene (Michael Hayes II Kick) Bears 49–35. Drive: 15 plays, 75 yards, 2:29.

Statistics	BAY	WVU
First downs	26	29
Total yards	512	499
Rushing yards	183	262
Passing yards	329	237
Passing: Comp–Att–Int	26–36–0	19–39–1
Time of possession	28:07	31:53

Team	Category	Player	Statistics
Baylor	Passing	Sawyer Robertson	26/36, 329 yards, 3 TD
Baylor	Rushing	Bryson Washington	18 carries, 123 yards, 3 TD
Baylor	Receiving	Josh Cameron	5 receptions, 101 yards, TD
West Virginia	Passing	Garrett Greene	19/39, 237 yards, 2 TD, INT
West Virginia	Rushing	Garrett Greene	22 carries, 129 yards, 2 TD
West Virginia	Receiving	Hudson Clement	3 receptions, 71 yards

=== vs UCF ===
UCF Knights (4–6) vs West Virginia Mountaineers (5–5) – Game summary

Quarter	1	2	3	4	Total
Knights	0	7	7	7	21
Mountaineers	14	7	7	3	31

at Milan Puskar Stadium • Morgantown, WV

- Date: November 23, 2024
- Game time: 3:30 p.m.
- Game weather: Rain • Temperature: 46 °F (8 °C) • Wind: W 8 miles per hour (13 km/h)
- Game attendance: 40,722
- Referee: Stepen Baron
- TV announcers (ESPNU): Mike Monaco (play-by-play), Kirk Morrison (analyst), and Dawn Davenport (sideline)

Game information

First quarter

- (10:34) WVU – CJ Donaldson Jr. 1-yard run, Michael Hayes II kick (Drive: 8 plays, 68 yards, 3:34; WVU 7–0)
- (1:47) WVU – Jahiem White 3-yard run, Michael Hayes II kick (Drive: 14 plays, 66 yards, 6:21; WVU 14–0)

Second quarter

- (8:37) UCF – RJ Harvey 2-yard run, Grant Reddick kick (Drive: 7 plays, 59 yards, 3:51; WVU 14–7)
- (0:15) WVU – Rodney Gallagher III 12-yard pass from Garrett Green, Michael Hayes II kick (Drive: 12 plays, 71 yards, 3:31; WVU 21–7)

Third quarter

- (12:10) WVU – CJ Donaldson Jr. 1-yard run, Michael Hayes II kick (Drive: 5 plays, 56 yards, 2:45; WVU 28–7)
- (5:38) UCF – Kobe Hudson 45-yard pass from Dylan Rizk, Grant Reddick kick (Drive: 5 plays, 85 yards, 2:18; WVU 28–14)

Fourth quarter

- (12:15) WVU – Michael Hayes II 35-yard field goal (Drive: 14 plays, 57 yards, 8:23; WVU 31–14)
- (5:20) UCF – RJ Harvey 9-yard run, Grant Reddick kick (Drive: 7 plays, 82 yards, 1:48; WVU 31–21)

Statistics	UCF	WVU
First downs	21	20
Total yards	348	318
Rushing yards	176	200
Passing yards	172	118
Passing: Comp–Att–Int	11–21–0	13–21–0
Time of possession	22:10	37:45

Team	Category	Player	Statistics
UCF	Passing	Dylan Rizk	11/21, 172 yards, TD
UCF	Rushing	RJ Harvey	16 carries, 130 yards, 2 TD
UCF	Receiving	Kobe Hudson	2 receptions, 68 yards, TD
West Virginia	Passing	Garrett Greene	13/21, 118 yards, TD
West Virginia	Rushing	CJ Donaldson Jr.	19 carries, 96 yards, 2 TD
West Virginia	Receiving	Hudson Clement	5 receptions, 81 yards

=== at Texas Tech ===
West Virginia Mountaineers (6–5) at Texas Tech Red Raiders (7–4) – Game summary

Quarter	1	2	3	4	Total
Mountaineers	3	0	6	6	15
Red Raiders	6	29	7	10	52

at Jones AT&T Stadium • Lubbock, TX

- Date: November 30, 2024
- Game time: 12:00 p.m.
- Game weather: Sunny, 51 °F (11 °C)
- Game attendance: 52,785
- Referee: Michael VanderVelde
- TV announcers (FS1): Eric Collins (play-by-play), Spencer Tillman (analyst), and Max Harnett (sideline)

Game information

First quarter

- TTU – Gino Garcia 32-yard field goal, 8:27. Red Raiders 3–0. Drive: 10 plays, 42 yards, 2:37.
- WVU – Michael Hayes II 52-yard field goal, 3:47. Tied 3–3. Drive: 8 plays, 41 yards, 4:40.
- TTU – Gino Garcia 23-yard field goal, 1:28. Red Raiders 6–3. Drive: 7 plays, 80 yards, 2:15.

Second quarter

- TTU – Tahj Brooks 2-yard run (Gino Garcia kick), 10:32. Red Raiders 13–3. Drive: 7 plays, 59 yards, 2:11.
- TTU – Mason Tharp 1-yard pass from Behren Morton (Gino Garcia kick), 4:19. Red Raiders 20–3. Drive: 11 plays, 75 yards, 3:42.
- TTU – Tahj Brooks 37-yard run (Jalin Conyers run), 1:35. Red Raiders 28–3. Drive: 4 plays, 53 yards, 1:05.
- TTU – Tahj Brooks 2-yard run (Gino Garcia kick), 0:09. Red Raiders 35–3. Drive: 4 plays, 35 yards, 0:38.

Third quarter

- TTU – Caleb Douglas 31-yard pass from Behren Morton (Gino Garcia kick), 12:48. Red Raiders 42–3. Drive: 9 plays, 75 yards, 2:12.
- WVU – Rodney Gallagher III 15-yard pass from Garrett Greene (pass failed), 2:04. Red Raiders 42–9. Drive: 12 plays, 91 yards, 6:03.

Fourth quarter

- TTU – Gino Garcia 22-yard field goal, 12:17. Red Raiders 45–9. Drive: 12 plays, 77 yards, 4:43.
- WVU – Jahiem White 21-yard run (pass failed), 8:38. Red Raiders 45–15. Drive: 8 plays, 75 yards, 3:40.
- TTU – Will Hammond 4-yard run (Stone Harrington kick), 3:36. Red Raiders 52–15. Drive: 11 plays, 64 yards, 5:01.

Statistics	WVU	TTU
First downs	26	31
Total yards	405	569
Rushing yards	140	210
Passing yards	265	359
Passing: Comp–Att–Int	29–40–2	28–42–1
Time of possession	34:42	25:18

Team	Category	Player	Statistics
West Virginia	Passing	Garrett Greene	29/39, 265 yards, TD, 2 INT
West Virginia	Rushing	Jahiem White	14 carries, 124 yards, TD
West Virginia	Receiving	CJ Donaldson	7 receptions, 73 yards
Texas Tech	Passing	Behren Morton	28/41, 359 yards, 2 TD, INT
Texas Tech	Rushing	Tahj Brooks	23 carries, 188 yards, 3 TD
Texas Tech	Receiving	Josh Kelly	9 receptions, 150 yards

=== vs. No. 25 Memphis (Frisco Bowl) ===
2024 Frisco Bowl
No. 25 Memphis Tigers (10–2) vs. West Virginia Mountaineers (6–6) – Game summary

Quarter	1	2	3	4	Total
No. 25 Tigers	7	21	7	7	42
Mountaineers	0	17	6	14	37

at Toyota Stadium • Frisco, TX

- Date: December 17, 2024
- Game time: 9:00 p.m.
- Game weather: Weather: 68 °F (20 °C), partly cloudy • Wind: S at 11 miles per hour (18 km/h)
- Game attendance: 12,022
- Referee: Jeremy Parker
- TV announcers (ESPN/Bowl Season Radio): Mike Monaco (play-by-play), Kirk Morrison (analyst), and Dawn Davenport (sideline)/Brian Estridge (play-by-play), Landry Burdine (analyst), and Michelle Montaine (sideline)

Game information

First Quarter

- (5:06) MEM – Mario Anderson Jr. 4 yard pass from Seth Henigan, Tristian Vandenburg kick (Drive: 5 plays, 45 yards, 2:50; Memphis 7–0)

Second Quarter

- (14:56) MEM – Tristian Vandenburg 34 yard field goal (Drive: 7 plays, 25 yards, 2:48; Memphis 10–0)
- (10:46) MEM – Greg Desrosiers Jr. 46 yard run, Tristian Vandenburg kick (Drive: 1 play, 46 yards, 0:10; Memphis 17–0)
- (7:28) WVU – Hudson Clement 33 yard pass from Garrett Greene, Michael Hayes II kick (Drive: 6 plays, 75 yards, 3:18; Memphis 17–7)
- (2:30) MEM – Tristian Vandenburg 42 yard field goal (Drive: 11 plays, 51 yards, 4:58; Memphis 20–7)
- (1:44) WVU – Garrett Greene 56 yard run, Michael Hayes II kick (Drive: 4 plays, 75 yards, 0:46; Memphis 20–14)
- (0:55) MEM – Demeer Blankumsee 18 yard pass from Seth Henigan, Demeer Blankumsee pass from Seth Henigan for 2-pt conversion (Drive: 5 plays, 75 yards, 0:47; Memphis 28–14)
- (0:00) WVU – Michael Hayes II 46 yard field goal (Drive: 7 plays, 47 yards, 0:55; Memphis 28–17)

Third Quarter

- (11:10) MEM – Mario Anderson Jr. 3 yard run, Tristian Vandenburg kick (Drive: 8 plays, 75 yards, 3:50; Memphis 35–17)
- (7:15) WVU – Hudson Clement 10 yard pass from Garrett Greene, 2-pt conversion failed (Drive: 10 plays, 75 yards, 3:55; Memphis 35–23)

Fourth Quarter

- (12:02) WVU – CJ Donaldson Jr. 1 yard run, Michael Hayes II kick (Drive: 16 plays, 90 yards, 7:51; Memphis 35–30)
- (10:49) MEM – Brandon Thomas 1 yard run, Tristian Vandenburg kick (Drive: 2 plays, 90 yards, 1:05; Memphis 42–30)
- (4:17) WVU – CJ Donaldson Jr. 1 yard run, Michael Hayes II kick (Drive: 12 plays, 75 yards, 6:32; Memphis 42–37)

Statistics	MEM	WVU
First downs	18	25
Total yards	474	534
Rushing yards	180	206
Passing yards	294	328
Passing: Comp–Att–Int	18–26–0	29–40–1
Time of possession	26:20	33:40

Team	Category	Player	Statistics
Memphis	Passing	Seth Henigan	18/26, 294 yards, 2 TD
Memphis	Rushing	Mario Anderson	17 carries, 70 yards, TD
Memphis	Receiving	DeMeer Blankumsee	4 receptions, 120 yards, TD
West Virginia	Passing	Garrett Greene	29/40, 328 yards, 2 TD, INT
West Virginia	Rushing	Garrett Greene	7 carries, 95 yards, TD
West Virginia	Receiving	Hudson Clement	11 receptions, 166 yards, 2 TD

== Coaching staff ==
Coach	Title	Year at West Virginia	Previous job
Neal Brown	Head coach	6th	Troy
Matt Moore	Assistant head coach/OL	6th	Troy (Co-OC/OL)
Chad Scott	OC/RB	6th	Louisville (RB)
Jeff Koonz	DC/ILB	5th	West Virginia (ILB/ST)
ShaDon Brown	Co-DC/secondary	4th	Louisville (S)
Tyler Allen	QB	3rd	West Virginia (OA/SATHC)
Victor Cabral	OLB	1st	Appalachian State (DL)
Andrew Jackson	DL	4th	Old Dominion (DL)
Bilal Marshall	WR	3rd	VMI (WR)
Blaine Stewart	TE	2nd	Pittsburgh Steelers (Assistant WR)
