= Chad Scott (American football coach) =

American football player and coach (born 1981)

Current position
- Title: Running backs coach
- Team: North Texas
- Conference: American

Biographical details
- Born: June 11, 1981 (age 45); Plant City, Florida, U.S.

Playing career
- 2000–2001: Kentucky
- 2002–2004: North Carolina
- Position: Running back

Coaching career (HC unless noted)
- 2006: North Carolina (GA)
- 2007–2009: Troy (RB)
- 2010–2012: Texas Tech (RB)
- 2013: Kentucky (RB)
- 2014–2015: Kentucky (RGC/RB)
- 2016–2018: North Carolina (TE)
- 2019–2021: West Virginia (Co-OC/RB)
- 2022: West Virginia (RGC/RB)
- 2023–2024: West Virginia (OC/RB)
- 2024: West Virginia (interim HC)
- 2025: Texas (RB)
- 2026-present: North Texas (RB)

Head coaching record
- Overall: 0–1
- Bowls: 0–1

Chad Terrell Scott (born June 11, 1981) is an American college football coach and former player. He was most recently the running backs coach for University of Texas. He has served in various assistant coach roles since 2006 and was on the West Virginia staff from 2019-2025.

== Coaching career ==
West Virginia University named Scott the interim head coach on December 2, 2024, following the firing of Neal Brown.

== Head coaching record ==
Year	Team	Overall	Conference	Standing	Bowl/playoffs
West Virginia Mountaineers (Big 12 Conference) (2024)
2024	West Virginia	0–1	0–0		L Frisco
West Virginia:		0–1	0–0		
Total:		0–1			
