= Hudson Clement =

American football player

No. 13 – Illinois Fighting Illini
- Position: Wide receiver
- Class: Redshirt Junior

Personal information
- Born: Martinsburg, West Virginia, U.S.
- Listed height: 6 ft 1 in (1.85 m)
- Listed weight: 205 lb (93 kg)

Career information
- High school: Martinsburg (Martinsburg, West Virginia)
- College: West Virginia (2022–2024); Illinois (2025–present)

Awards and highlights
- Randy Moss Award (2021)
- Stats at ESPN

Hudson Clement is an American college football wide receiver for the Illinois Fighting Illini. He previously played for the West Virginia Mountaineers.

== Early life ==
Clement grew up in Martinsburg, West Virginia and attended Martinsburg High School. At Martinsburg, he started at outside linebacker and wide receiver. During his senior season, Clement earned the Randy Moss Award as the best wide receiver in the state of West Virginia after posting 87 catches for 1,709 yards and 23 touchdowns. He also helped his team to a state title. He would commit to play college football as a walk-on at West Virginia.

== College career ==
=== West Virginia ===
Clement redshirted during his true freshman season in 2022, appearing in one game without recording any stats.

During the 2023 season, he would receive a scholarship after appearing in his first college football game against Duquesne, where he caught five passes for 177 yards and three touchdowns, helping the Mountaineers accumulate a 56-17 win. He would play in a total of 11 games in the season and started eight of them, finishing the season with 22 receptions for 480 yards and four touchdowns, averaging 21.8 yards per catch.

During the 2024 season, he would play in and start all 12 games. While playing against Kansas, he would record seven receptions for 150 yards, including back-to-back first quarter receptions of 38 and 39 yards that set up scoring drives. He would finish the season with 51 receptions for 741 yards and five touchdowns, averaging 14.5 yards per catch.

On December 20, 2024, Clement announced that he would enter the transfer portal.

=== Illinois ===
On January 2, 2025, Clement and his brother Murphy both transferred to Illinois.

=== College statistics ===
Legend
**Bold**	Career high

Year	Team	GP	Receiving			
Year	Team	GP	Rec	Yds	Avg	TD
2022	West Virginia	0	(redshirt) Redshirted			
2023	West Virginia	11	22	480	**21.8**	4
2024	West Virginia	12	**51**	**741**	14.5	**5**
2025	Illinois	**13**	36	454	12.6	3
Career		36	109	1,675	15.4	12

== Personal life ==
Clement is the son of Mike and Tracy Clement and has two brothers. His brother Murphy plays football at Illinois with him.
