= CJ Donaldson =

American football player (born 2004)

No. 43 – New Orleans Saints
- Position: Running back
- Roster status: Active

Personal information
- Born: July 9, 2004 (age 22)
- Listed height: 6 ft 2 in (1.88 m)
- Listed weight: 230 lb (104 kg)

Career information
- High school: Gulliver Prep (Coral Gables, Florida)
- College: West Virginia (2022–2024); Ohio State (2025)
- NFL draft: 2026: undrafted

Career history
- New Orleans Saints (2026–present)

Career NFL statistics as of Week 7, 2026
- Rushing yards: 81
- Rushing average: 4.8
- Receptions: 4
- Receiving yards: 10
- Stats at Pro Football Reference

De'Carlo "CJ" Donaldson Jr. (born July 9, 2004) is an American professional football running back for the New Orleans Saints of the National Football League (NFL). He played college football for the West Virginia Mountaineers and the Ohio State Buckeyes. He was signed as an undrafted free agent by the Saints in 2026.

== Early life ==
Donaldson grew up in Miami, Florida and attended Gulliver Preparatory School, where he played wide receiver on the football team. As a senior, he caught 81 passes for 1,164 yards and 13 touchdowns. Donaldson was rated a three-star recruit and initially committed to play college football Tulane. He later de-committed and signed to play at West Virginia over offers from Florida, Florida State, Miami, South Carolina, Louisville, Indiana, and Syracuse.

== College career ==
=== West Virginia ===
Donaldson was recruited by West Virginia to play tight end. He was moved to running back during preseason training camp. Donaldson was named the Mountaineers' starting running back going into his freshman season. He was named the Big 12 Conference Newcomer of the Week for week 1 after rushing for 125 yards and one touchdown on seven carries and also blocking a kick on special teams in a 38–31 loss to Pittsburgh.

On December 19, 2024, Donaldson announced that he would enter the transfer portal.

=== Ohio State ===
On December 23, 2024, Donaldson committed to the Ohio State Buckeyes.

== Professional career ==
Pre-draft measurables
Height	Weight	Arm length	Hand span	Wingspan	40-yard dash	10-yard split	20-yard split	20-yard shuttle	Three-cone drill	Vertical jump	Broad jump	Bench press
6 ft 1 5/8 in (1.87 m)	230 lb (104 kg)	31 3/4 in (0.81 m)	9 1/2 in (0.24 m)	6 ft 7 1/4 in (2.01 m)	4.63 s	1.63 s	2.69 s	4.53 s	7.22 s	36.5 in (0.93 m)	10 ft 0 in (3.05 m)	14 reps
All values from NFL Combine/Pro Day

After going undrafted in the 2026 NFL draft, Donaldson signed with the New Orleans Saints as an undrafted free agent. On August 30, 2026, Donaldson was waived by the Saints as a part of final roster cuts; he was re–signed to the team's practice squad the following day. He was promoted to the active roster on September 18.
