= Mike Monaco =

American sportscaster (born 1993)

Jay Michael Monaco
- Born: Jay Michael Monaco; May 14, 1993 (age 33); Cohasset, Massachusetts
- Education: University of Notre Dame
- Years active: 2012–present
- Sports commentary career
- Genre: Play-by-play
- Sports: Baseball, basketball, college football, ice hockey, tennis

Jay Michael Monaco (born May 14, 1993) is an American television sportscaster who is currently employed as a play-by-play announcer for ESPN and its networks. Monaco is also the alternate television and radio play-by-play voice for the Boston Red Sox of Major League Baseball (MLB) on the New England Sports Network (NESN) and WEEI.

== Personal life and education ==
A native of Cohasset, Massachusetts, Monaco was a three-sport athlete at Cohasset High School. He attended the University of Notre Dame and wrote for the school's student newspaper with the intent to become a Major League Baseball general manager, similar to the path former Red Sox general manager Theo Epstein had when he attended Yale. Monaco eventually transitioned to the school radio station at Notre Dame and subsequently began his broadcasting career.

Monaco currently resides in Chicago.

== Career ==
Monaco interned at NESN in 2012 while at Notre Dame, before broadcasting Fighting Irish sporting events. In 2013 and 2014, he called games for the Wareham Gatemen of the Cape Cod Baseball League. He also called Western Michigan Broncos basketball games while at Notre Dame before interning with the Red Sox's Triple-A affiliate Pawtucket Red Sox as a radio broadcaster in 2017.

Monaco joined ESPN in 2019 after two years working with Fox Sports and the Big Ten Network. He was named the alternate television play-by-play voice for the Boston Red Sox in 2019, filling in for regular play-by-play voice Dave O'Brien when O'Brien had prior commitments calling college football on the ACC Network. As a resident of Chicago, Monaco has also filled in on telecasts for Chicago White Sox, Chicago Bulls, and Chicago Blackhawks games.

Monaco's current assignments with ESPN and ABC include the NBA, NHL, Major League Baseball, college football, college basketball, college baseball, tennis and the Little League World Series.
