= Garrett Greene =

American football player (born 2001)

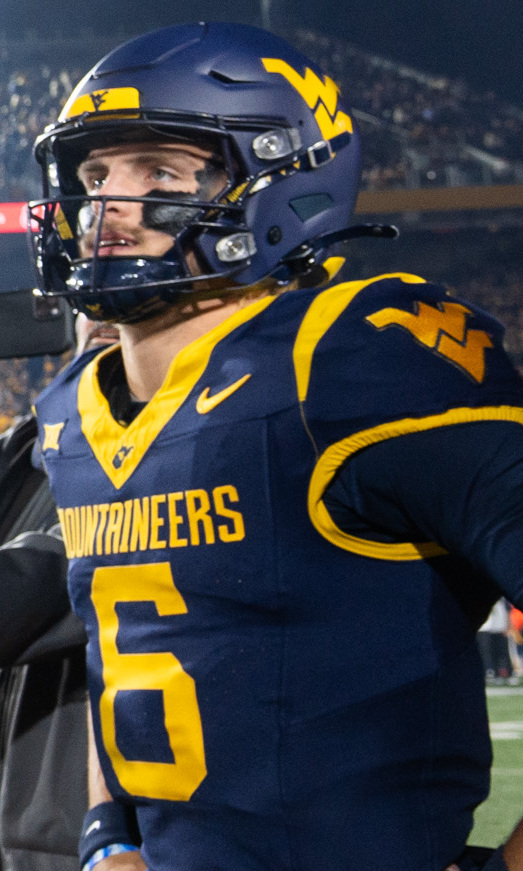
- Greene with the West Virginia Mountaineers in 2024

No. 85 – Tampa Bay Buccaneers
- Position: Wide receiver
- Roster status: Practice squad

Personal information
- Born: October 1, 2001 (age 25); Tallahassee, Florida, U.S.
- Listed height: 5 ft 11 in (1.80 m)
- Listed weight: 201 lb (91 kg)

Career information
- High school: Chiles (Leon County, Florida)
- College: West Virginia (2020–2024)
- NFL draft: 2025: undrafted

Career history
- Tampa Bay Buccaneers (2025–present)*
- * Offseason or practice squad member only
- Stats at Pro Football Reference

Garrett Greene (born October 1, 2001) is an American professional football wide receiver for the Tampa Bay Buccaneers of the National Football League (NFL). He played college football as a quarterback for the West Virginia Mountaineers.

== Early life ==
Greene attended Chiles High School, where he passed for 2,917 yards and 25 touchdowns and rushed for 2,660 yards and 31 touchdowns. He committed to play college football at West Virginia University over other schools such as Georgia Tech, Mississippi State, Ole Miss, and TCU.

== College career ==
As a freshman in 2020, Greene completed three of four passes for 24 yards and rushed six times for 40 yards. In the 2021 season opener, he threw for 57 yards and rushed for 98 yards and two touchdowns in a 66-0 win over LIU. Greene finished the 2021 season completing 16 of 26 passes for 147 yards, while also rushing for 297 yards and four touchdowns on 48 carries. In week 11, Greene replaced starter JT Daniels, who was benched in the first quarter, and completed 12 of 22 passes for 138 yards and a touchdown, while also rushing for 119 yards and two touchdowns in a 23-20 win over Oklahoma. The next week, West Virginia announced that he would get his first career start. In his first start Greene completed 15 of 27 passes for 204 yards and three touchdowns with two interceptions, while also rushing for a touchdown, in a 48-31 loss to Kansas State. He finished the 2022 season completing 43 of 78 passing attempts for 493 yards and five touchdowns to three interceptions, and rushing for 276 yards and five touchdowns, while also hauling in four receptions for 32 yards. In week 2 of the 2023 season, he completed ten passes for 240 yards and four touchdowns in a win over Duquesne.

=== Statistics ===
Year	Team	Games			Passing								Rushing			
Year	Team	GP	GS	Record	Comp	Att	Pct	Yards	Avg	TD	Int	Rate	Att	Yards	Avg	TD
2020	West Virginia	2	0	0–0	3	4	75.0	24	6.0	0	0	125.4	6	40	6.7	0
2021	West Virginia	11	0	0–0	16	26	61.5	147	5.7	0	0	109.0	47	306	6.5	4
2022	West Virginia	9	2	1–1	43	78	55.1	493	6.3	5	3	121.7	45	276	6.1	5
2023	West Virginia	12	12	8–4	147	277	53.1	2,406	8.7	16	4	142.2	120	772	6.4	13
2024	West Virginia	11	11	4–7	189	315	60.0	2,300	7.3	15	12	132.8	134	734	5.5	6
Career		45	25	13–12	398	700	56.9	5,370	7.7	36	19	132.8	352	2,128	6.0	28

== Professional career ==
Pre-draft measurables
Height	Weight	Arm length	Hand span	Wingspan	40-yard dash	10-yard split	20-yard split	20-yard shuttle	Three-cone drill	Vertical jump	Broad jump
5 ft 10 3/4 in (1.80 m)	195 lb (88 kg)	29 in (0.74 m)	8 1/2 in (0.22 m)	6 ft 1 1/2 in (1.87 m)	4.50 s	1.56 s	2.62 s	4.08 s	6.84 s	36.5 in (0.93 m)	9 ft 7 in (2.92 m)
All values from Pro Day

Greene signed with the Tampa Bay Buccaneers as an undrafted free agent on May 9, 2025. He was waived on August 26 as part of final roster cuts and re-signed to the practice squad the next day. On January 8, 2026, Greene signed a reserve/futures contract with Tampa Bay.

On August 30, 2026, Greene was waived by the Buccaneers as a part of final roster cuts; he was re-signed to the team's practice squad.
