= 2025 Big 12 Conference football season =

American college football season

- League: NCAA Division I FBS football season
- Sport: football
- Duration: August 23, 2025; January 2026
- Teams: 16
- TV partner(s): ESPN (ABC, ESPN, ESPN2, ESPN+, ESPNU, Big 12 Now); Fox Sports (Fox, FS1, FS2); TNT Sports (TNT, HBO Max)

2026 NFL draft
- Top draft pick: David Bailey
- Picked by: New York Jets

Regular season
- Season champions: Texas Tech
- Runners-up: BYU

Championship Game
- Date: December 6, 2025
- Venue: AT&T Stadium, Arlington, Texas
- Champions: Texas Tech
- Runners-up: BYU

Seasons
- 2024 2026

2025 Big 12 Conference football standings
	Conf.			Overall
Team	W		L	W		L
No. 7 Texas Tech y$^	8	–	1	12	–	2
No. 11 BYU y	8	–	1	12	–	2
No. 14 Utah	7	–	2	11	–	2
No. 22 Houston	6	–	3	10	–	3
Arizona	6	–	3	9	–	4
Arizona State	6	–	3	8	–	5
No. 25 TCU	5	–	4	9	–	4
Iowa State	5	–	4	8	–	4
Cincinnati	5	–	4	7	–	6
Kansas State	5	–	4	6	–	6
Baylor	3	–	6	5	–	7
Kansas	3	–	6	5	–	7
UCF	2	–	7	5	–	7
West Virginia	2	–	7	4	–	8
Colorado	1	–	8	3	–	9
Oklahoma State	0	–	9	1	–	11
Championship: Texas Tech 34, BYU 7
^ – College Football Playoff participant; $ – Conference champion; y – Championship game participant; Rankings from AP Poll

The 2025 Big 12 Conference football season was the 30th season of the Big 12 Conference football, part of the 2025 NCAA Division I FBS football season.

The 2025 Big 12 Championship Game was played at AT&T Stadium in Arlington, Texas, on December 6, 2025. The two top teams, Texas Tech and BYU, played for the conference's automatic berth into the 2025–26 College Football Playoff, which Texas Tech won.

== Preseason ==
=== Recruiting classes ===
National rankings
Team	ESPN	Rivals	24/7	On3 recruits	Total signees
Arizona	61	42	49	48	24
Arizona State	42	40	43	46	28
Baylor	38	33	37	40	21
BYU	63	49	55	59	23
Cincinnati	69	67	61	65	19
Colorado	34	52	38	35	14
Houston	59	51	52	52	20
Iowa State	64	55	54	58	19
Kansas	60	71	73	70	15
Kansas State	32	43	35	37	25
Oklahoma State	53	45	53	41	21
TCU	21	26	24	26	32
Texas Tech	51	62	47	43	18
UCF	62	70	79	62	15
Utah	33	45	42	38	25
West Virginia	40	44	51	42	28

=== Big 12 media days ===
The 2025 Big 12 media days were held on July 8–9, 2025 at the Ford Center at The Star in Frisco, Texas.

- Big 12 Commissioner – Brett Yormark

School	Date	Head Coach	Players					
Arizona	July 9	Brent Brennan	Noah Fifita	Rhino Tapa'atoutai	Tre Smith	Treydan Stukes	Dalton Johnson	Genesis Smith
Arizona State	July 8	Kenny Dillingham	Sam Leavitt	Jordyn Tyson	Ben Coleman	C.J. Fite	Clayton Smith	Xavion Alford
Baylor	July 8	Dave Aranda	Sawyer Robertson	Josh Cameron	Omar Aigbedion	Jackie Marshall	Keaton Thomas	Devyn Bobby
BYU	July 8	Kalani Sitake	LJ Martin	Chase Roberts	Jack Kelly	Isaiah Glasker	Keanu Tanuvasa	
Cincinnati	July 8	Scott Satterfield	Brendan Sorsby	Joe Royer	Gavin Gerhardt	Dontay Corleone		
Colorado	July 9	Deion Sanders	Julian Lewis	Kaidon Salter	Jordan Seaton	DJ McKinney	Alejandro Mata	
Houston	July 9	Willie Fritz	Mekhi Mews	Stephon Johnson	Carlos Allen Jr.	Latrell McCutchin Sr.		
Iowa State	July 8	Matt Campbell	Rocco Becht	Tyler Miller	Domonique Orange	Jeremiah Cooper	Jontez Williams	
Kansas	July 9	Lance Leipold	Jalon Daniels	Bryce Foster	Dean Miller	D.J. Withers		
Kansas State	July 8	Chris Klieman	Avery Johnson	Taylor Poitier	Cody Stufflebean	Des Purnell	VJ Payne	
Oklahoma State	July 9	Mike Gundy	Josh Ford	Iman Oates	Cam Smith			
TCU	July 9	Sonny Dykes	Josh Hoover	Eric McAlister	Coltin Deery	Devean Deal	Namdi Obiazor	Bud Clark
Texas Tech	July 8	Joey McGuire	Behren Morton	Caleb Douglas	Romello Height	Lee Hunter	Jacob Rodriguez	Cole Wisniewski
UCF	July 8	Scott Frost	Myles Montgomery	Paul Rubelt	Nyjalik Kelly	Keli Lawson		
Utah	July 9	Kyle Whittingham	Devon Dampier	Spencer Fano	Smith Snowden	Lander Barton		
West Virginia	July 9	Rich Rodriguez	Jaden Bray	Landen Livingston	Edward Vesterinen			

=== Preseason awards ===
==== All−American Teams ====
Player	AP 1st Team	AS 1st Team	AS 2nd Team	AS 3rd Team	AS 4th Team	WCFF 1st Team	WCFF 2nd Team	ESPN	CBS 1st Team	CBS 2nd Team	CFN 1st Team	CFN 2nd Team	PFF 1st Team	SN 1st Team	SN 2nd Team	SI 1st Team	SI 2nd Team	USAT 1st Team	USAT 2nd Team
Josh Cameron		✓																	
Dontay Corleone					✓		✓					✓					✓		
Spencer Fano	✓	✓				✓		✓	✓			✓	✓	✓		✓		✓	
Dylan Edwards				✓															
Will Ferrin			✓																✓
Parker Kingston					✓									✓		✓			
Tanner Koziol									✓		✓				✓				
Sam Leavitt							✓												
Caleb Lomu					✓														
Domonique Orange					✓														
Jacob Rodriguez					✓														
Austin Romaine			✓																
Jordan Seaton				✓			✓												
Keaton Thomas					✓														
Jordyn Tyson	✓	✓					✓			✓		✓	✓	✓		✓			✓
Bryson Washington				✓															
Jahiem White					✓														
Palmer Williams				✓						✓				✓	✓				✓

==== Individual awards ====
Award	Head Coach/Player	School	Position	Year	Ref
Lott Trophy	Taye Brown	Arizona	LB	Jr.	
Lott Trophy	Dontay Corleone	Cincinnati	DL	Sr.	
Lott Trophy	DJ McKinney	Colorado	CB	Jr.	
Lott Trophy	David Bailey	Texas Tech	LB	Sr.	
Dodd Trophy	Kenny Dillingham	Arizona State	HC	--	
Dodd Trophy	Kalani Sitake	BYU	HC	--	
Dodd Trophy	Matt Campbell	Iowa State	HC	--	
Dodd Trophy	Chris Klieman	Kansas State	HC	--	
Dodd Trophy	Joey McGuire	Texas Tech	HC	--	
Maxwell Award	Noah Fifita	Arizona	QB	Jr.	
Maxwell Award	Jordyn Tyson	Arizona State	WR	R-Jr.	
Maxwell Award	Sam Leavitt	Arizona State	QB	R-So.	
Maxwell Award	Sawyer Robertson	Baylor	QB	Sr.	
Maxwell Award	Bryson Washington	Baylor	RB	So.	
Maxwell Award	Brendan Sorsby	Cincinnati	QB	Jr.	
Maxwell Award	Rocco Becht	Iowa State	QB	R-Jr.	
Maxwell Award	Avery Johnson	Kansas State	QB	Jr.	
Maxwell Award	Dylan Edwards	Kansas State	RB	Jr.	
Maxwell Award	Josh Hoover	TCU	QB	Jr.	
Maxwell Award	Behren Morton	Texas Tech	QB	Sr.	
Maxwell Award	Jaden Nixon	UCF	RB	Sr.	
Maxwell Award	Devon Dampier	Utah	QB	Jr.	
Maxwell Award	Jahiem White	West Virginia	RB	Jr.	
Bronko Nagurski Trophy	CJ Fite	Arizona State	DT	Jr.	
Bronko Nagurski Trophy	Keaton Thomas	Baylor	LB	R-Jr.	
Bronko Nagurski Trophy	Jack Kelly	BYU	LB	R-Sr.	
Bronko Nagurski Trophy	Dontay Corleone	Cincinnati	DL	Sr.	
Bronko Nagurski Trophy	Jeremiah Cooper	Iowa State	S	Sr.	
Bronko Nagurski Trophy	Austin Romaine	Kansas State	LB	Jr.	
Bronko Nagurski Trophy	Bud Clark	TCU	S	Sr.	
Bronko Nagurski Trophy	Jacob Rodriguez	Texas Tech	LB	R-Sr.	
Bronko Nagurski Trophy	Lee Hunter	Texas Tech	DT	R-Sr.	
Outland Trophy	CJ Fite	Arizona State	DT	Jr.	
Outland Trophy	Omar Aigbedion	Baylor	OL	Sr.	
Outland Trophy	Dontay Corleone	Cincinnati	DL	Sr.	
Outland Trophy	Jordan Seaton	Colorado	OT	So.	
Outland Trophy	Bryce Foster	Kansas	OT	R-Jr.	
Outland Trophy	Lee Hunter	Texas Tech	DT	R-Sr.	
Outland Trophy	Caleb Lomu	Utah	OT	R-So.	
Outland Trophy	Spencer Fano	Utah	OT	Jr.	
Butkus Award	Keyshaun Elliott	Arizona State	LB	Sr.	
Butkus Award	Keaton Thomas	Baylor	LB	R-Jr.	
Butkus Award	Isaiah Glasker	BYU	LB	R-Jr.	
Butkus Award	Jack Kelly	BYU	LB	R-Sr.	
Butkus Award	Austin Romaine	Kansas State	LB	Jr.	
Butkus Award	Bryan McCoy Jr.	Oklahoma State	LB	Sr.	
Butkus Award	Kaleb Elarms-Orr	TCU	LB	Sr.	
Butkus Award	Jacob Rodriguez	Texas Tech	LB	R-Sr.	
Butkus Award	Lander Barton	Utah	LB	Sr.	
Jim Thorpe Award	Xavion Alford	Arizona State	DB	R-Sr.	
Jim Thorpe Award	Jeremiah Cooper	Iowa State	DB	Sr.	
Jim Thorpe Award	Jontez Williams	Iowa State	DB	R-So.	
Jim Thorpe Award	Bud Clark	TCU	DB	Sr.	
Paul Hornung Award	Ismail Mahdi	Arizona	RB	Sr.	
Paul Hornung Award	Jalen Moss	Arizona State	WR	R-Jr.	
Paul Hornung Award	Josh Cameron	Baylor	WR	R-Sr.	
Paul Hornung Award	Parker Kingston	BYU	WR	R-Jr.	
Paul Hornung Award	Mekhi Mews	Houston	WR	Sr.	
Paul Hornung Award	Dylan Edwards	Kansas State	RB	Jr.	
Paul Hornung Award	Jaden Nixon	UCF	RB	R-Sr.	
Paul Hornung Award	Smith Snowden	Utah	CB	Jr.	
Wuerffel Trophy	Genesis Smith	Arizona	DB	Jr.	
Wuerffel Trophy	Coben Bourguet	Arizona State	WR	R-Sr.	
Wuerffel Trophy	Sawyer Robertson	Baylor	QB	Jr.	
Wuerffel Trophy	Tanner Wall	BYU	DT/S	R-Sr.	
Wuerffel Trophy	Gavin Gerhardt	Cincinnati	C	6Yr.	
Wuerffel Trophy	Charlie Offerdahl	Colorado	RB	Sr.	
Wuerffel Trophy	Rocco Becht	Iowa State	QB	R-Jr.	
Wuerffel Trophy	Leyton Cure	Kansas	TE	R-Sr.	
Wuerffel Trophy	Damian Ilalio	Kansas State	DT	Sr.	
Wuerffel Trophy	Paul Oyewale	TCU	DE/Edge	Jr.	
Wuerffel Trophy	Behren Morton	Texas Tech	QB	Sr.	
Wuerffel Trophy	Paul Rubelt	UCF	OL	5Yr.	
Wuerffel Trophy	Devon Dampier	Utah	QB	Jr.	
Wuerffel Trophy	Nicco Marchiol	West Virginia	QB	R-Jr.	
Lou Groza Award	Will Ferrin	BYU	PK	Jr.	
Lou Groza Award	Kyle Konrardy	Iowa State	PK	Fr.	
Lou Groza Award	Gabe Panikowski	Oklahoma State	PK	Sr.	
Ray Guy Award	Palmer Williams	Baylor	P	Jr.	
Patrick Mannelly Award	Garrison Grimes	BYU	LS	R-Sr.	
Patrick Mannelly Award	Drew Clausen	Iowa State	LS	R-Sr.	
Patrick Mannelly Award	Shea Freibaum	Oklahoma State	LS	Jr.	
Walter Camp Award	Sam Leavitt	Arizona State	QB	R-So.	
Walter Camp Award	Jordyn Tyson	Arizona State	WR	R-Jr.	
Walter Camp Award	Kaidon Salter	Colorado	QB	R-Sr.	
Walter Camp Award	Jalon Daniels	Kansas	QB	R-Sr.	
Doak Walker Award	Bryson Washington	Baylor	RB	So.	
Doak Walker Award	LJ Martin	BYU	RB	So.	
Doak Walker Award	Tawee Walker	Cincinnati	RB	R-Sr.	
Doak Walker Award	Dallan Hayden	Colorado	RB	Jr.	
Doak Walker Award	Micah Welch	Colorado	RB	So.	
Doak Walker Award	Abu Sama III	Iowa State	RB	Jr.	
Doak Walker Award	Carson Hansen	Iowa State	RB	Jr.	
Doak Walker Award	Leshon Williams	Kansas	RB	R-Sr.	
Doak Walker Award	Daniel Hishaw Jr.	Kansas	RB	Sr.	
Doak Walker Award	Dylan Edwards	Kansas State	RB	Jr.	
Doak Walker Award	Quinten Joyner	Texas Tech	RB	R-So.	
Doak Walker Award	Jaden Nixon	UCF	RB	R-Sr.	
Doak Walker Award	Myles Montgomery	UCF	RB	R-Sr.	
Doak Walker Award	Wayshawn Parker	Utah	RB	So.	
Doak Walker Award	Jahiem White	West Virginia	RB	Jr.	
Biletnikoff Award	Luke Wysong	Arizona	WR	R-Sr.	
Biletnikoff Award	Jordyn Tyson	Arizona State	WR	R-Jr.	
Biletnikoff Award	Josh Cameron	Baylor	WR	R-Sr.	
Biletnikoff Award	Chase Roberts	BYU	WR	R-Sr.	
Biletnikoff Award	Tanner Koziol	Houston	TE	Sr.	
Biletnikoff Award	Jayce Brown	Kansas State	WR	Jr.	
Biletnikoff Award	Eric McAlister	TCU	WR	Sr.	
Biletnikoff Award	Caleb Douglas	Texas Tech	WR	Jr.	
Biletnikoff Award	Reggie Virgil	Texas Tech	WR	Sr.	
Biletnikoff Award	Cam Vaughn	West Virginia	WR	R-So.	

Award	Head Coach/Player	School	Position	Year	Ref
Davey O'Brien Award	Sam Leavitt	Arizona State	QB	R-So.	
Davey O'Brien Award	Sawyer Robertson	Baylor	QB	Sr.	
Davey O'Brien Award	Brendan Sorsby	Cincinnati	QB	Jr.	
Davey O'Brien Award	Rocco Becht	Iowa State	QB	R-Jr.	
Davey O'Brien Award	Avery Johnson	Kansas State	QB	Jr.	
Davey O'Brien Award	Josh Hoover	TCU	QB	Jr.	
Davey O'Brien Award	Behren Morton	Texas Tech	QB	Sr.	
Davey O'Brien Award	Devon Dampier	Utah	QB	Jr.	
John Mackey Award	Keyan Burnett	Arizona	TE	Sr.	
John Mackey Award	Chamon Metayer	Arizona State	TE	R-Sr.	
John Mackey Award	Michael Trigg	Baylor	TE	R-Sr.	
John Mackey Award	Joe Royer	Cincinnati	TE	R-Sr.	
John Mackey Award	Tanner Koziol	Houston	TE	Sr.	
John Mackey Award	Gabe Burkle	Iowa State	TE	R-So.	
John Mackey Award	Garrett Oakley	Kansas State	TE	Jr.	
Rimington Trophy	Ben Coleman	Arizona State	OL	Gr.	
Rimington Trophy	Coleton Price	Baylor	OL	R-Jr.	
Rimington Trophy	Gavin Gerhardt	Cincinnati	OL	R-Sr.	
Rimington Trophy	Demetrius Hunter	Houston	OL	Jr.	
Rimington Trophy	Dylan Barrett	Iowa State	OL	R-Jr.	
Rimington Trophy	Bryce Foster	Kansas	OL	R-Sr.	
Rimington Trophy	Sam Hecht	Kansas State	OL	Sr.	
Rimington Trophy	Sheridan Wilson	Texas Tech	OL	Jr.	
Rimington Trophy	Jaren Kump	Utah	OL	Sr.	
Bednarik Award	Xavion Alford	Arizona State	CB	R-Sr.	
Bednarik Award	Keaton Thomas	Baylor	LB	R-Jr.	
Bednarik Award	Isaiah Glasker	BYU	LB	R-Jr.	
Bednarik Award	Dontay Corleone	Cincinnati	DL	Sr.	
Bednarik Award	Domonique Orange	Iowa State	DT	Sr.	
Bednarik Award	Jontez Williams	Iowa State	CB	R-Jr.	
Bednarik Award	Austin Romaine	Kansas State	LB	Jr.	
Bednarik Award	Bud Clark	TCU	DB	Sr.	
Bednarik Award	David Bailey	Texas Tech	LB	Sr.	
Bednarik Award	Jacob Rodriguez	Texas Tech	LB	R-Sr.	
Bednarik Award	Lee Hunter	Texas Tech	DT	R-Sr.	
Bednarik Award	Smith Snowden	Utah	CB	Jr.	
Bednarik Award	Tacario Davis	Washington	CB	Sr.	
Rotary Lombardi Award	Dontay Corleone	Cincinnati	DL	Sr.	
Rotary Lombardi Award	Jordan Seaton	Colorado	OL	So.	
Rotary Lombardi Award	David Bailey	Texas Tech	LB	Sr.	
Rotary Lombardi Award	Jacob Rodriguez	Texas Tech	LB	R-Sr.	
Rotary Lombardi Award	Spencer Fano	Utah	OL	Jr.	
Manning Award	Sam Leavitt	Arizona State	QB	R-So.	
Manning Award	Sawyer Robertson	Baylor	QB	Sr.	
Manning Award	Brendan Sorsby	Cincinnati	QB	Jr.	
Manning Award	Rocco Becht	Iowa State	QB	R-Jr.	
Manning Award	Avery Johnson	Kansas State	QB	Jr.	
Manning Award	Josh Hoover	TCU	QB	Jr.	
Manning Award	Behren Morton	Texas Tech	QB	Sr.	
Polynesian College Football Player Of The Year Award	Ka'ena Decambra	Arizona	C	R-Sr.	
Polynesian College Football Player Of The Year Award	Chubba Ma'ae	Arizona	G	R-Sr.	
Polynesian College Football Player Of The Year Award	Noah Fifita	Arizona	QB	Jr.	
Polynesian College Football Player Of The Year Award	Tiaoalii Savea	Arizona	DL	R-Jr.	
Polynesian College Football Player Of The Year Award	Rhino Tapa'atoutai	Arizona	T	R-So.	
Polynesian College Football Player Of The Year Award	Samu Taumanupepe	Baylor	DL	R-So.	
Polynesian College Football Player Of The Year Award	Tausli Akana	BYU	DE	R-So.	
Polynesian College Football Player Of The Year Award	Siale Esera	BYU	DL	R-So.	
Polynesian College Football Player Of The Year Award	Raider Damuni	BYU	SS	Jr.	
Polynesian College Football Player Of The Year Award	Weylin Lapuaho	BYU	G	Sr.	
Polynesian College Football Player Of The Year Award	Logan Lutui	BYU	DE	R-Sr.	
Polynesian College Football Player Of The Year Award	Sonny Makasini	BYU	G	R-Jr.	
Polynesian College Football Player Of The Year Award	Keanu Tanuvasa	BYU	DT	R-Jr.	
Polynesian College Football Player Of The Year Award	Sione Fotu	Houston	LB	Jr.	
Polynesian College Football Player Of The Year Award	Khalil Laufau	Houston	DT	Jr.	
Polynesian College Football Player Of The Year Award	Tamatoa McDonough	Iowa State	DE	R-Sr.	
Polynesian College Football Player Of The Year Award	Tavake Tuikolovatu	Kansas	G	R-So.	
Polynesian College Football Player Of The Year Award	Damian Ilalio	Kansas State	DE	R-Sr.	
Polynesian College Football Player Of The Year Award	Levani Damuni	Utah	LB	Gr.	
Polynesian College Football Player Of The Year Award	Logan Fano	Utah	DE	R-Jr.	
Polynesian College Football Player Of The Year Award	Spencer Fano	Utah	T	Jr.	
Polynesian College Football Player Of The Year Award	Caleb Lomu	Utah	T	R-So.	
Polynesian College Football Player Of The Year Award	Aliki Vimahi	Utah	T	Gr.	
Polynesian College Football Player Of The Year Award	Michael Mokofisi	Utah	G	R-Sr.	
Polynesian College Football Player Of The Year Award	Tanoa Togiai	Utah	G	R-Sr.	
Polynesian College Football Player Of The Year Award	Dallas Vakalahi	Utah	DT	So	
Polynesian College Football Player Of The Year Award	Kimo Makane'ole	West Virginia	G	R-Sr.	
Johnny Unitas Golden Arm Award	Noah Fifita	Arizona	QB	Jr.	
Johnny Unitas Golden Arm Award	Sam Leavitt	Arizona State	QB	R-So.	
Johnny Unitas Golden Arm Award	Sawyer Robertson	Baylor	QB	Sr.	
Johnny Unitas Golden Arm Award	Brendan Sorsby	Cincinnati	QB	Jr.	
Johnny Unitas Golden Arm Award	Conner Weigman	Houston	QB	Jr.	
Johnny Unitas Golden Arm Award	Avery Johnson	Kansas State	QB	Jr.	
Johnny Unitas Golden Arm Award	Josh Hoover	TCU	QB	Jr.	
Johnny Unitas Golden Arm Award	Behren Morton	Texas Tech	QB	Sr.	
Earl Campbell Tyler Rose Award	Ty Buchanan	Arizona	OL	Sr.	
Earl Campbell Tyler Rose Award	Jordyn Tyson	Arizona State	WR	R-Jr.	
Earl Campbell Tyler Rose Award	Bryson Washington	Baylor	RB	R-So.	
Earl Campbell Tyler Rose Award	Josh Cameron	Baylor	WR	R-Sr.	
Earl Campbell Tyler Rose Award	Sawyer Robertson	Baylor	QB	R-Sr.	
Earl Campbell Tyler Rose Award	L.J. Martin	BYU	RB	So.	
Earl Campbell Tyler Rose Award	Brendan Sorsby	Cincinnati	QB	Jr.	
Earl Campbell Tyler Rose Award	Kaidon Salter	Colorado	QB	Sr.	
Earl Campbell Tyler Rose Award	Dre'lon Miller	Colorado	WR	So.	
Earl Campbell Tyler Rose Award	Conner Weigman	Houston	QB	R-Jr.	
Earl Campbell Tyler Rose Award	Bryce Foster	Kansas	OL	R-Jr.	
Earl Campbell Tyler Rose Award	Josh Hoover	TCU	QB	Jr.	
Earl Campbell Tyler Rose Award	Caleb Douglas	Texas Tech	WR	Sr.	
Earl Campbell Tyler Rose Award	Coy Eakin	Texas Tech	WR	R-Jr.	
Earl Campbell Tyler Rose Award	Behren Morton	Texas Tech	QB	R-Sr.	
Earl Campbell Tyler Rose Award	Jaden Nixon	UCF	RB	R-So.	
Shaun Alexander Freshman Player of the Year Award	Julian Lewis	Colorado	QB	Fr.	
Shaun Alexander Freshman Player of the Year Award	Linkon Cure	Kansas State	TE	Fr.	
Shaun Alexander Freshman Player of the Year Award	Rodney Fields Jr.	Oklahoma State	RB	R-Fr.	
Shaun Alexander Freshman Player of the Year Award	Ryan Hughes	TCU	OT	R-Fr.	

==== Preseason All-Big 12 teams ====
2025 Preseason All-Big 12

- Offensive Player of the Year: Sam Leavitt, QB, Arizona State, RS-So.
- Defensive Player of the Year: Jacob Rodriguez, LB, Texas Tech, Sr.
- Newcomer of the Year: Devon Dampier, QB, Utah, Jr.

All-Big 12 Offense
Position	Player	Class	Team
QB	Sam Leavitt	RS-So.	Arizona State
RB	Bryson Washington	RS-So.	Baylor
RB	Jahiem White	Jr.	West Virginia
FB	Will Swanson	Sr.	Kansas State
WR	Eric McAlister	Sr.	TCU
WR	Chase Roberts	RS-Sr.	BYU
WR	Jordyn Tyson	RS-Jr.	Arizona State
TE	Joe Royer	RS-Sr.	Cincinnati
OL	Ben Coleman	Gr.	Arizona State
OL	Spencer Fano	Jr.	Utah
OL	Bryce Foster	RS-Jr.	Kansas
OL	Caleb Lomu	RS-So.	Utah
OL	Jordan Seaton	So.	Colorado
PK	Will Ferrin	RS-Sr.	BYU
KR/PR	Josh Cameron	RS-Sr.	Baylor

All-Big 12 Defense
Position	Player	Class	Team
DL	David Bailey	Sr.	Texas Tech
DL	Dontay Corleone	RS-Sr.	Cincinnati
DL	C.J. Fite	Jr.	Arizona State
DL	Lee Hunter	Sr.	Texas Tech
DL	Domonique Orange	Sr.	Iowa State
LB	Jacob Rodriguez	Sr.	Texas Tech
LB	Austin Romaine	Jr.	Kansas State
LB	Keaton Thomas	RS-Jr.	Baylor
DB	Xavion Alford	RS-Sr.	Arizona State
DB	Bud Clark	Sr.	TCU
DB	Jeremiah Cooper	Sr.	Iowa State
DB	DJ McKinney	Jr.	Colorado
DB	Jontez Williams	RS-Jr.	Iowa State
P	Palmer Williams	Jr.	Baylor

== Head coaches ==
=== Coaching changes ===
There were two coaching changes before the 2025 season. On December 1, 2024 Neal Brown was fired as head coach of West Virginia. On December 12, 2024 West Virginia announced the return of former head coach Rich Rodriguez, the 36th head coach in school history. On December 2, 2024 Gus Malzahn announced he was leaving as head coach of UCF and accepting the offensive coordinator position at Florida State. On December 7, 2024 UCF announced the return of former head coach Scott Frost.

On September 23, 2025 Oklahoma State head coach Mike Gundy was fired after 21 seasons. He finished his career with a 170–90 record, the winningest coach in school history.

=== Coaches ===
Note: All stats current through the completion of the 2024 season

Team	Head coach	Year at school	Overall record	Record at school	Big 12 record	Conference Championships
Arizona	Brent Brennan	2	38–56	4–8	2–7	0
Arizona State	Kenny Dillingham	3	14–12	14–12	7–2	1
Baylor	Dave Aranda	6	31–30	31–30	21–24	1
BYU	Kalani Sitake	10	72–43	72–43	9–9	0
Cincinnati	Scott Satterfield	3	84–64	5–16	4–14	0
Colorado	Deion Sanders	3	40–18	13–12	7–2	0
Houston	Willie Fritz	2	212–124	4–8	3–6	0
Iowa State	Matt Campbell‡	10	99–66	64–51	45–36	0
Kansas	Lance Leipold	5	168–67	22–28	13–23	0
Kansas State	Chris Klieman	7	120–41	48–28	31–23	1
Oklahoma State	Mike Gundy†	21	169–88	169–88	102–72	1
TCU	Sonny Dykes	4	98–76	27–13	18–9	0
Texas Tech	Joey McGuire	4	23–16	23–16	16–11	0
UCF	Scott Frost	3	35–38	19–7	0–0	0
Utah	Kyle Whittingham#	21	167–86	167–86	2–7	0
West Virginia	Rich Rodriguez	8	190–129–2	60–26	0–0	0

Notes:

- † Mike Gundy was fired after 3 games. Offensive coordinator Doug Meacham will serve as interim head coach for the remainder of the season. On November 11, 2025 Eric Morris was announced as the official replacement following the end of the 2025 season.
- ‡ Following the conclusion of the 2025 regular season, Matt Campbell accepted the head coaching position at Penn State on December 8, 2025. Jimmy Rogers was named as the replacement.
- # On December 12, 2025 Utah head coach Kyle Whittingham announced his final game would be the 2025 Las Vegas Bowl.

== Schedule ==
Index to colors and formatting
Big 12 member won
Big 12 member lost
Big 12 teams in **bold**

All times Central time.

† denotes Homecoming game

Rankings reflect those of the AP poll for weeks 1 through 9. Rankings from Week 10 until the end of the Season reflect those of the College Football Playoff Rankings.

=== Regular season ===
==== Week Zero ====
Date	Time	Visiting team	Home team	Site	TV	Result	Attendance	Ref.
August 23	11:00 a.m.	No. 22 **Iowa State**	No. 17 **Kansas State**	Aviva Stadium • Dublin, Ireland (Aer Lingus College Football Classic / Farmageddon)	ESPN	**ISU** 24–21	47,221	
August 23	5:30 p.m.	Fresno State	**Kansas**	David Booth Kansas Memorial Stadium • Lawrence, KS	FOX	**W** 31–7	41,525	
^{#}Rankings from AP Poll released prior to game. All times are in Central Time.

==== Week One ====
Date	Time	Visiting team	Home team	Site	TV	Result	Attendance	Ref.
August 28	6:00 p.m	Jacksonville State	**UCF**	Acrisure Bounce House • Orlando, FL	ESPN+	**W** 17–10	43,043	
August 28	6:30 p.m	UT Martin	**Oklahoma State**	Boone Pickens Stadium • Stillwater, OK	ESPN+	**W** 27–7	44,809	
August 28	7:00 p.m.	No. 23 (FCS) Stephen F. Austin	**Houston**	TDECU Stadium • Houston, TX	ESPN+	**W** 27–0	28,150	
August 28	8:00 p.m.	Nebraska	**Cincinnati**	Arrowhead Stadium • Kansas City, MO	ESPN	**L** 17–20	72,884	
August 29	6:30 p.m.	Wagner	**Kansas**	David Booth Kansas Memorial Stadium • Lawrence, KS	ESPN+	**W** 46–7	39,129	
August 29	7:00 p.m.	Auburn	**Baylor**	McLane Stadium • Waco, TX	FOX	**L** 24–38	45,233	
August 29	7:00 p.m.	Georgia Tech	**Colorado**	Folsom Field • Boulder, CO	ESPN	**L** 20–27	52,868	
August 30	1:00 p.m.	Robert Morris	**West Virginia**	Milan Puskar Stadium • Morgantown, WV	ESPN+	**W** 45–3	57,093	
August 30	2:30 p.m.	No. 4 (FCS) South Dakota	No. 22 **Iowa State**	Jack Trice Stadium • Ames, IA	FOX	**W** 55–7	61,500	
August 30	6:00 p.m.	North Dakota	No. 17 **Kansas State**	Bill Snyder Family Football Stadium • Manhattan, KS	ESPN+	**W** 38–35	51,927	
August 30	6:30 p.m	Arkansas–Pine Bluff	No. 23 **Texas Tech**	Jones AT&T Stadium • Lubbock, TX	ESPN+	**W** 67–7	60,229	
August 30	7:00 p.m.	Portland State	**BYU**	LaVell Edwards Stadium • Provo, UT	ESPN+	**W** 69–0	64,494	
August 30	9:00 p.m.	No. 19 (FCS) Northern Arizona	No. 11 **Arizona State**	Mountain America Stadium • Tempe, AZ	ESPN+	**W** 38–19	56,759	
August 30	9:30 p.m.	Hawaii	**Arizona**	Arizona Stadium • Tucson, AZ	TNT	**W** 40–6	42,423	
August 30	10:00 p.m.	**Utah**	UCLA	Rose Bowl • Pasadena, CA	FOX	**W** 43–10	35,032	
September 1	7:00 p.m.	**TCU**	North Carolina	Kenan Memorial Stadium • Chapel Hill, NC	ESPN	**W** 48–14	50,500	
^{#}Rankings from AP Poll released prior to game. All times are in Central Time.

==== Week Two ====
Date	Time	Visiting team	Home team	Site	TV	Result	Attendance	Ref.
September 6	11:00 a.m.	**Baylor**	No. 17 SMU	Gerald J. Ford Stadium • Dallas, TX	The CW	**W** 48–45 ^{2OT}	34,852	
September 6	11:00 a.m	No. 16 Iowa	**Iowa State**	Jack Trice Stadium • Ames, IA (Cy-Hawk Trophy, Big Noon Kickoff)	FOX	**W** 16–13	61,500	
September 6	11:00 a.m.	Kent State	No. 24 **Texas Tech**	Jones AT&T Stadium • Lubbock, TX	TNT	**W** 62–14	60,229	
September 6	2:30 p.m.	Bowling Green	**Cincinnati**	Nippert Stadium • Cincinnati, OH	ESPN+	**W** 34–20	35,421	
September 6	2:30 p.m.	Delaware	**Colorado**	Folsom Field • Boulder, CO	FOX	**W** 31–7	50,341	
September 6	2:30 p.m.	**Kansas**	Missouri	Faurot Field • Columbia, MO (Border War)	ESPN2	**L** 31–42	57,321	
September 6	2:30 p.m.	**Oklahoma State**	No. 6 Oregon	Autzen Stadium • Eugene, OR	CBS	**L** 3–69	57,266	
September 6	3:00 p.m.	**West Virginia**	Ohio	Peden Stadium • Athens, OH	ESPNU	**L** 10–17	26,740	
September 6	5:00 p.m.	Cal Poly	No. 25 **Utah**	Rice–Eccles Stadium • Salt Lake City, UT	ESPN+	**W** 63–9	51,463	
September 6	6:00 p.m.	**Houston**	Rice	Rice Stadium • Houston, TX (rivalry)	ESPN+	**W** 35–9	30,116	
September 6	6:00 p.m.	Army	**Kansas State**	Bill Snyder Family Football Stadium • Manhattan, KS	ESPN+	**L** 21–24	52,723	
September 6	6:00 p.m.	North Carolina A&T	**UCF**	Acrisure Bounce House • Orlando, FL	ESPN+	**W** 68–7	44,009	
September 6	6:30 p.m.	No. 12 **Arizona State**	Mississippi State	Davis Wade Stadium • Starkville, MS	ESPN2	**L** 20–24	50,808	
September 6	9:00 p.m.	Weber State	**Arizona**	Arizona Stadium • Tucson, AZ	ESPN+	**W** 48–3	40,038	
September 6	9:15 p.m.	Stanford	**BYU**	LaVell Edwards Stadium • Provo, UT	ESPN	**W** 27–3	64,692	
^{#}Rankings from AP Poll released prior to game. All times are in Central Time.

Date	Bye Week
September 6	**TCU**

==== Week Three ====
Date	Time	Visiting team	Home team	Site	TV	Result	Attendance	Ref.
September 12	6:30 p.m.	**Colorado**	**Houston**	TDECU Stadium • Houston, TX	ESPN	**HOU** 36–20	37,899	
September 12	8:00 p.m.	**Kansas State** (Note: Although both Arizona and Kansas State are in the Big 12, this game will not count in conference standings due to the game being scheduled before Arizona joined the Big 12.)	**Arizona**	Arizona Stadium • Tucson, AZ	FOX	**ARIZ** 23–17	40,051	
September 13	11:00 a.m.	Samford	**Baylor**	McLane Stadium • Waco, TX	ESPN+	**W** 42–7	41,215	
September 13	2:30 p.m.	Northwestern State	**Cincinnati**	Nippert Stadium • Cincinnati, OH	ESPN+	**W** 70–0	30,014	
September 13	2:30 p.m.	Oregon State	No. 21 **Texas Tech**	Jones AT&T Stadium • Lubbock, TX	FOX	**W** 45–14	60,229	
September 13	2:30 p.m.	Pittsburgh	**West Virginia**	Milan Puskar Stadium • Morgantown, WV (Backyard Brawl)	ESPN	**W** 31–24 ^{OT}	62,108	
September 13	3:00 p.m.	No. 14 **Iowa State**	Arkansas State	Centennial Bank Stadium • Jonesboro, AR	ESPN2	**W** 24–16	22,348	
September 13	7:00 p.m.	No. 13 (FCS) Abilene Christian	**TCU**	Amon G. Carter Stadium • Fort Worth, TX	ESPN	**W** 42–21	48,094	
September 13	7:00 p.m.	No. 20 **Utah**	Wyoming	War Memorial Stadium • Laramie, WY	CBSSN	**W** 31–6	23,500	
September 13	9:30 p.m.	Texas State	**Arizona State**	Mountain America Stadium • Tempe, AZ	TNT	**W** 34–15	54,005	
^{#}Rankings from AP Poll released prior to game. All times are in Central Time.

Notes: ‡ game is being played as a non-conference game and will not count towards conference standings

Date	Bye Week			
September 13	**BYU**	**Kansas**	**Oklahoma State**	**UCF**

==== Week Four ====
Date	Time	Visiting team	Home team	Site	TV	Result	Attendance	Ref.
September 19	6:30 p.m.	Tulsa	**Oklahoma State**	Boone Pickens Stadium • Stillwater, OK (rivalry)	ESPN	**L** 12–19	48,842	
September 20	11:00 a.m.	SMU	**TCU**	Amon G. Carter Stadium • Fort Worth, TX (rivalry)	ESPN2	**W** 35–24	43,333	
September 20	11:00 a.m.	No. 17 **Texas Tech**	No. 16 **Utah**	Rice–Eccles Stadium • Salt Lake City, UT (Big Noon Kickoff)	FOX	**TTU** 34–10	52,236	
September 20	2:30 p.m.	North Carolina	**UCF**	Acrisure Bounce House • Orlando, FL	FOX	**W** 34–9	45,206	
September 20	5:00 p.m.	**West Virginia**	**Kansas**	David Booth Kansas Memorial Stadium • Lawrence, KS	FS1	**KU** 41–10	40,320	
September 20	6:30 p.m.	**Arizona State**	**Baylor**	McLane Stadium • Waco, TX	FOX	**ASU** 27–24	40,964	
September 20	6:30 p.m.	**BYU**	East Carolina	Dowdy–Ficklen Stadium • Greenville, NC	ESPN2	**W** 34–13	47,213	
September 20	9:15 p.m.	Wyoming	**Colorado**	Folsom Field • Boulder, CO	ESPN	**W** 37–20	53,442	
^{#}Rankings from AP Poll released prior to game. All times are in Central Time.

Date	Bye Week				
September 20	**Arizona**	**Cincinnati**	**Houston**	**No. 12 Iowa State**	**Kansas State**

==== Week Five ====
Date	Time	Visiting team	Home team	Site	TV	Result	Attendance	Ref.
September 26	8:00 p.m.	No. 24 **TCU**	**Arizona State**	Mountain America Stadium • Tempe, AZ	FOX	**ASU** 27–24	53,774	
September 26	9:30 p.m.	**Houston**	Oregon State	Reser Stadium • Corvallis, OR	ESPN	**W** 27–24 ^{OT}	29,338	
September 27	11:00 a.m.	**Cincinnati**	**Kansas**	David Booth Kansas Memorial Stadium • Lawrence, KS	TNT	**CIN** 37–34	41,525	
September 27	11:00 a.m.	**UCF**	**Kansas State**	Bill Snyder Family Football Stadium • Manhattan, KS	FS1	**KSU** 34–20	53,013	
September 27	2:30 p.m.	**Baylor**	**Oklahoma State**	Boone Pickens Stadium • Stillwater, OK	ESPN2	**BAY** 45–27	45,689	
September 27	2:30 p.m.	**Utah**	**West Virginia**	Milan Puskar Stadium • Morgantown, WV	FOX	**UTAH** 48–14	53,965	
September 27	6:00 p.m.	**Arizona**	No. 14 **Iowa State**	Jack Trice Stadium • Ames, IA	ESPN	**ISU** 39–14	61,500	
September 27	9:15 p.m.	No. 25 **BYU**	**Colorado**	Folsom Field • Boulder, CO	ESPN	**BYU** 24–21	52,265	
^{#}Rankings from AP Poll released prior to game. All times are in Central Time.

Date	Bye Week
September 27	No. 12 **Texas Tech**

==== Week Six ====
Date	Time	Visiting team	Home team	Site	TV	Result	Attendance	Ref.
October 3	9:30 p.m.	**West Virginia**	No. 23 **BYU**	LaVell Edwards Stadium • Provo, UT	ESPN	**BYU** 38–24	63,917	
October 4	11:00 a.m.	**Kansas State**	**Baylor**	McLane Stadium • Waco, TX	ESPN+	**BAY** 35–34	35,596	
October 4	11:00 a.m.	No. 14 **Iowa State**	**Cincinnati**	Nippert Stadium • Cincinnati, OH	ESPN2	**CIN** 38–30	38,007	
October 4	2:00 p.m.	**Oklahoma State**	**Arizona**	Arizona Stadium • Tucson, AZ	TNT	**ARIZ** 41–13	40,685	
October 4	6:00 p.m.	No. 11 **Texas Tech**	**Houston**	TDECU Stadium • Houston, TX (rivalry)	ESPN	**TTU** 35–11	42,806	
October 4	6:30 p.m.	**Kansas**	**UCF**	Acrisure Bounce House • Orlando, FL	ESPN2	**KU** 27–20	43,229	
October 4	6:30 p.m.	**Colorado**	**TCU**	Amon G. Carter Stadium • Fort Worth, TX	FOX	**TCU** 35–21	43,160	
^{#}Rankings from AP Poll released prior to game. All times are in Central Time.

Date	Bye Week	
October 4	**No. 25 Arizona State**	**Utah**

==== Week Seven ====
Date	Time	Visiting team	Home team	Site	TV	Result	Attendance	Ref.
October 11	11:00 a.m.	**Houston**	**Oklahoma State**	Boone Pickens Stadium • Stillwater, OK	TNT	**HOU** 39–17	44,941	
October 11	11:00 a.m.	**UCF**	**Cincinnati**	Nippert Stadium • Cincinnati, OH (rivalry)	FS1	**CIN** 20–11	35,782	
October 11	2:30 p.m.	**Colorado**	No. 22 **Iowa State**	Jack Trice Stadium • Ames, IA	ESPN	**COL** 24–17	52,698	
October 11	2:30 p.m.	**TCU**	**Kansas State**	Bill Snyder Family Football Stadium • Manhattan, KS	FOX	**KSU** 41–28	51,316	
October 11	6:30 p.m.	**Kansas**	No. 9 **Texas Tech**	Jones AT&T Stadium • Lubbock, TX	FOX	**TTU** 42–17	60,229	
October 11	7:00 p.m.	No. 18 **BYU**	**Arizona**	Arizona Stadium • Tucson, AZ	ESPN2	**BYU** 33–27 ^{2OT}	47,960	
October 11	9:15 pm	No. 21 **Arizona State**	**Utah**	Rice–Eccles Stadium • Salt Lake City, UT	ESPN	**UTAH** 42–10	51,444	
^{#}Rankings from AP Poll released prior to game. All times are in Central Time.

Date	Bye Week	
October 11	**Baylor**	**West Virginia**

==== Week Eight ====
Date	Time	Visiting team	Home team	Site	TV	Result	Attendance	Ref.
October 18	11:00 a.m.	**Arizona**	**Houston**	TDECU Stadium • Houston, TX	FS1	**HOU** 31–28	28,535	
October 18	11:00 a.m.	**Baylor**	**TCU**	Amon G. Carter Stadium • Fort Worth, TX (rivalry)	ESPN2	**TCU** 42–36	43,868	
October 18	12:00 p.m.	**West Virginia**	**UCF**	Acrisure Bounce House • Orlando, FL	TNT	**UCF** 45–13	43,445	
October 18	3:00 p.m.	No. 7 **Texas Tech**	**Arizona State**	Mountain America Stadium • Tempe, AZ	FOX	**ASU** 26–22	54,177	
October 18	7:00 p.m.	No. 23 **Utah**	No. 15 **BYU**	LaVell Edwards Stadium • Provo, UT (Holy War/Big Noon Kickoff)	FOX	**BYU** 24–21	64,794	
October 18	7:00 p.m.	No. 24 **Cincinnati**	**Oklahoma State**	Boone Pickens Stadium • Stillwater, OK	ESPN2	**CIN** 49–17	46,901	
^{#}Rankings from AP Poll released prior to game. All times are in Central Time.

Date	Bye Week			
October 18	**Colorado**	**Iowa State**	**Kansas**	**Kansas State**

==== Week Nine ====
Date	Time	Visiting team	Home team	Site	TV	Result	Attendance	Ref.
October 25	11:00 a.m.	**Kansas State**	**Kansas**	David Booth Kansas Memorial Stadium • Lawrence, KS (Sunflower Showdown)	TNT	**KSU** 42–17	41,525	
October 25	2:30 p.m.	No. 11 **BYU**	**Iowa State**	Jack Trice Stadium • Ames, IA	FOX	**BYU** 41–27	61,500	
October 25	3:00 p.m.	**Baylor**	No. 21 **Cincinnati**	Nippert Stadium • Cincinnati, OH	ESPN2	**CIN** 41–20	38,007	
October 25	3:00 p.m.	**Oklahoma State**	No. 14 **Texas Tech**	Jones AT&T Stadium • Lubbock, TX	ESPNU	**TTU** 42–0	59,625	
October 25	5:00 p.m.	**TCU**	**West Virginia**	Milan Puskar Stadium • Morgantown, WV	ESPN+	**TCU** 23–17	54,110	
October 25	7:00 p.m.	**Houston**	No. 24 **Arizona State**	Mountain America Stadium • Tempe, AZ	ESPN2	**HOU** 24–16	54,256	
October 25	9:15 p.m.	**Colorado**	**Utah**	Rice–Eccles Stadium • Salt Lake City, UT (Rumble in the Rockies)	ESPN	**UTAH** 53–7	51,949	
^{#}Rankings from AP Poll released prior to game. All times are in Central Time.

Date	Bye Week	
October 25	**Arizona**	**UCF**

==== Week Ten ====
Date	Time	Visiting team	Home team	Site	TV	Result	Attendance	Ref.
November 1	11:00 a.m.	**UCF**	**Baylor**	McLane Stadium • Waco, TX	ESPNU	**BAY** 30–3	40,212	
November 1	11:00 a.m.	**West Virginia**	No. 22 **Houston**	TDECU Stadium • Houston, TX	FS1	**WVU** 45–35	25,049	
November 1	12:00 p.m.	**Arizona State**	**Iowa State**	Jack Trice Stadium • Ames, IA	TNT/TruTV	**ASU** 24–19	60,889	
November 1	2:30 p.m.	No. 13 **Texas Tech**	**Kansas State**	Bill Snyder Family Football Stadium • Manhattan, KS	FOX	**TTU** 43–20	52,111	
November 1	3:00 p.m.	**Oklahoma State**	**Kansas**	David Booth Kansas Memorial Stadium • Lawrence, KS	ESPN+	**KU** 38–21	39,511	
November 1	6:00 p.m.	**Arizona**	**Colorado**	Folsom Field • Boulder, CO	FS1	**ARIZ** 52–17	48,322	
November 1	9:15 p.m.	No. 17 **Cincinnati**	No. 24 **Utah**	Rice–Eccles Stadium • Salt Lake City, UT (College GameDay)	ESPN	**UTAH** 45–14	51,672	
^{#}Rankings from AP Poll released prior to game. All times are in Central Time.

Date	Bye Week	
November 1	**No. 10 BYU**	**TCU**

==== Week Eleven ====
Date	Time	Visiting team	Home team	Site	TV	Result	Attendance	Ref.
November 7	7:00 p.m.	**Houston**	**UCF**	Acrisure Bounce House • Orlando, FL	FS1	**HOU** 30–27	44,206	
November 8	11:00 a.m.	No. 7 **BYU**	No. 8 **Texas Tech**	Jones AT&T Stadium • Lubbock, TX (College GameDay)	ABC	**TTU** 29–7	60,229	
November 8	1:00 p.m.	**Colorado**	**West Virginia**	Milan Puskar Stadium • Morgantown, WV	TNT/TruTV	**WVU** 29–22	55,510	
November 8	2:30 p.m.	**Kansas**	**Arizona**	Arizona Stadium • Tucson, AZ	ESPN2	**ARIZ** 24–20	41,115	
November 8	2:30 p.m.	**Iowa State**	**TCU**	Amon G. Carter Stadium • Fort Worth, TX	FOX	**ISU** 20–17	44,197	
^{#}Rankings from College Football Playoff. All times are in Central Time.

Date	Bye Week					
November 8	**Arizona State**	**Baylor**	**Cincinnati**	**Kansas State**	**Oklahoma State**	**No. 13 Utah**

==== Week Twelve ====
Date	Time	Visiting team	Home team	Site	TV	Result	Attendance	Ref.
November 15	11:00 a.m.	**Arizona**	No. 25 **Cincinnati**	Nippert Stadium • Cincinnati, OH	FS1	**ARIZ** 30–24	37,099	
November 15	11:00 a.m.	**Kansas State**	**Oklahoma State**	Boone Pickens Stadium • Stillwater, OK	ESPNU	**KSU** 14–6	46,340	
November 15	12:00 p.m.	**West Virginia**	**Arizona State**	Mountain America Stadium • Tempe, AZ	TNT/HBO Max	**ASU** 25–23	54,101	
November 15	2:30 p.m.	**UCF**	No. 6 **Texas Tech**	Jones AT&T Stadium • Lubbock, TX	FOX	**TTU** 48–9	60,229	
November 15	6:00 p.m.	No. 13 **Utah**	**Baylor**	McLane Stadium • Waco, TX	ESPN2	**UTAH** 55–28	38,186	
November 15	9:15 p.m.	**TCU**	No. 13 **BYU**	LaVell Edwards Stadium • Provo, UT	ESPN	**BYU** 44–13	64,447	
^{#}Rankings from College Football Playoff. All times are in Central Time.

Date	Bye Week			
November 15	**Colorado**	**Houston**	**Iowa State**	**Kansas**

==== Week Thirteen ====
Date	Time	Visiting team	Home team	Site	TV	Result	Attendance	Ref.
November 22	11:00 a.m.	**Kansas**	**Iowa State**	Jack Trice Stadium • Ames, IA	FS1	**ISU** 38–14	58,275	
November 22	12:00 p.m.	**Baylor**	**Arizona**	Casino Del Sol Stadium • Tucson, AZ	TNT/TruTV	**ARIZ** 41–17	40,199	
November 22	3:00 p.m.	**Oklahoma State**	**UCF**	Acrisure Bounce House • Orlando, FL	ESPN+	**UCF** 17–14	41,723	
November 22	3:00 p.m.	**Kansas State**	No. 12 **Utah**	Rice–Eccles Stadium • Salt Lake City, UT	ESPN2	**UTAH** 51–47	51,444	
November 22	3:00 p.m.	**TCU**	No. 23 **Houston**	TDECU Stadium • Houston, TX	FOX	**TCU** 17–14	30,852	
November 22	7:00 p.m.	No. 11 **BYU**	**Cincinnati**	Nippert Stadium • Cincinnati, OH (Big Noon Kickoff)	FOX	**BYU** 26–14	38,034	
November 22	7:00 p.m.	No. 25 **Arizona State**	**Colorado**	Folsom Field • Boulder, CO	ESPN2	**ASU** 42–17	43,348	
^{#}Rankings from College Football Playoff. All times are in Central Time.

Date	Bye Week	
November 22	**No. 5 Texas Tech**	**West Virginia**

==== Week Fourteen ====
Date	Time	Visiting team	Home team	Site	TV	Result	Attendance	Ref.
November 28	11:00 a.m.	No. 13 **Utah**	**Kansas**	David Booth Kansas Memorial Stadium • Lawrence, KS	ESPN	**UTAH** 31–21	32,811	
November 28	8:00 p.m.	No. 25 **Arizona**	No. 20 **Arizona State**	Mountain America Stadium • Tempe, AZ (rivalry)	FOX	**ARIZ** 23–7	54,037	
November 29	11:00 a.m.	No. 5 **Texas Tech**	**West Virginia**	Milan Puskar Stadium • Morgantown, WV	ESPN	**TTU** 49–0	44,250	
November 29	11:00 a.m.	**Iowa State**	**Oklahoma State**	Boone Pickens Stadium • Stillwater, OK	ESPNU	**ISU** 20–13	35,127	
November 29	11:00 a.m.	**Houston**	**Baylor**	McLane Stadium • Waco, TX (rivalry)	TNT/TruTV	**HOU** 31–24	34,720	
November 29	11:00 a.m.	**Colorado**	**Kansas State**	Bill Snyder Family Football Stadium • Manhattan, KS (rivalry)	FS1	**KSU** 24–14	49,549	
November 29	12:00 p.m.	**UCF**	No. 11 **BYU**	LaVell Edwards Stadium • Provo, UT	ESPN2	**BYU** 41–21	60,389	
November 29	2:30 p.m.	**Cincinnati**	**TCU**	Amon G. Carter Stadium • Fort Worth, TX	FOX	**TCU** 45–23	37,259	
^{#}Rankings from College Football Playoff. All times are in Central Time.

=== Championship Game ===
Date	Time	Visiting team	Home team	Site	TV	Result	Attendance	Ref.
December 6	11:00 a.m.	No. 11 **BYU**	No. 4 **Texas Tech**	AT&T Stadium • Arlington, Texas	ABC	**TTU** 34–7	85,519	
^{#}Rankings from College Football Playoff. All times are in Central Time.

== Postseason ==
=== Bowl games ===
Legend
Big 12 win
Big 12 loss

The four former Pac-12 Conference teams: Arizona, Arizona State, Colorado & Utah will have previous conference tie-ins to the Alamo Bowl, Independence Bowl, Holiday Bowl, Las Vegas Bowl, LA Bowl and Sun Bowl.

Bowl game	Date	Site	Time (CST)	Television	Big 12 team	Opponent	Score	Attendance	Conference Bowl Record
Pop-Tarts Bowl	December 27	Camping World Stadium • Orlando, Florida	2:30 p.m.	ABC	**No. 12 BYU**	No. 22 Georgia Tech	**W** 25−21	34,126	1−0
Texas Bowl	December 27	NRG Stadium • Houston, Texas	8:15 p.m.	ESPN	**No. 21 Houston**	LSU	**W** 38−35	63,867	2−0
Valero Bowl	December 30	Alamodome • San Antonio, Texas	8:00 p.m.	ESPN	**TCU**	No. 16 USC	**W** 30−27 ^{OT}	54,751	3−0
Sun Bowl	December 31	Sun Bowl • El Paso, Texas	1:00 p.m.	CBS	Arizona State	**Duke**	**L** 39−42	44,975	3−1
Las Vegas Bowl	December 31	Allegiant Stadium • Las Vegas, Nevada (Note: Allegiant Stadium is located outside the Las Vegas city limits in the unincorporated community of Paradise, Nevada. "Las Vegas" is the official mailing address for all unincorporated areas in the vicinity of the city, including Paradise.)	2:30 p.m.	ESPN	**No. 15 Utah**	Nebraska	**W** 44−22	38,879	4−1
Liberty Bowl	January 2, 2026	Simmons Bank Liberty Stadium • Memphis, Tennessee	3:30 p.m.	ESPN	Cincinnati	**Navy**	**L** 13−35	21,908	4−2
Holiday Bowl	January 2, 2026	Snapdragon Stadium • San Diego, CA	6:00 p.m.	FOX	No. 17 Arizona	**SMU**	**L** 19−24	30,602	4−3
**College Football Playoff bowl games**
Orange Bowl	January 1, 2026	Hard Rock Stadium • Miami, Florida	11:00 a.m.	ESPN	No. 4 Texas Tech	**No. 5 Oregon**	**L** 0−23	65,021	4−4

Rankings are from CFP rankings. All times Central Time Zone. Big-12 teams shown in bold.

=== Selection of teams ===
- **Bowl eligible (10): Arizona, Arizona State, BYU, Cincinnati, Houston, Iowa State‡, Kansas State‡, TCU, Texas Tech, Utah**

‡ Iowa State & Kansas State opted out of their bowl game but was still bowl eligible.

- **Bowl-ineligible (6): Baylor, Colorado, Kansas, Oklahoma State, UCF, West Virginia**

== Head to head matchups ==
	Arizona	Arizona; State	Baylor	BYU	Cincinnati	Colorado	Houston	Iowa; State	Kansas	Kansas; State	Oklahoma; State	TCU	Texas; Tech	UCF	Utah	West; Virginia
vs. Arizona	—	0–1	0–1	1–0	0–1	0–1	1–0	1–0	0–1		0–1					
vs. Arizona State	1–0	—	0–1			0–1	1–0	0–1				0–1	0–1		1–0	0–1
vs. Baylor	1–0	1–0	—		1–0		1–0			0–1	0–1	1–0		0–1	1–0	
vs. BYU	0–1			—	0–1	0–1		0–1				0–1	1–0	0–1	0–1	0–1
vs. Cincinnati	1–0		0–1	1–0	—			0–1	0–1		0–1	1–0		0–1	1–0	
vs. Colorado	1–0	1–0		1–0		—	1–0	0–1		1–0		1–0			1–0	1–0
vs. Houston	0–1	0–1	0–1			0–1	—				0–1	1–0	1–0	0–1		1–0
vs. Iowa State	0–1	1–0		1–0	1–0	1–0		—	0–1	0–1	0–1	0–1				
vs. Kansas	1–0				1–0			1–0	—	1–0	0–1		1–0	0–1	1–0	0–1
vs. Kansas State			1–0			0–1		1–0	0–1	—	0–1	0–1	1–0	0–1	1–0	
vs. Oklahoma State	1–0		1–0		1–0		1–0	1–0	1–0	1–0	—		1–0	1–0		
vs. TCU		1–0	0–1	1–0	0–1	0–1	0–1	1–0		1–0		—				0–1
vs. Texas Tech		1–0		0–1			0–1		0–1	0–1	0–1		—	0–1	0–1	0–1
vs. UCF			1–0	1–0	1–0		1–0		1–0	1–0	0–1		1–0	—		0–1
vs. Utah		0–1	0–1	1–0	0–1	0–1			0–1	0–1			1–0		—	0–1
vs. West Virginia		1–0		1–0		0–1	0–1		1–0			1–0	1–0	1–0	1–0	—
Total	6–3	6–3	3–6	8–1	5–4	1–8	6–3	5–4	3–6	5–4	0–9	5–4	8–1	2–7	7–2	2–7

Updated thru Week 14.

Does not include Non-Conference matchups between Arizona vs. Kansas State

== Big 12 vs. other conferences ==
=== Big 12 vs. Power 4 matchups ===
This is a list of the Power Four conferences teams (ACC, Big Ten, Notre Dame and SEC).

Date	Big 12 Team	Opponent	Conference	Location	Result
August 29	Cincinnati†	Nebraska	Big Ten	Arrowhead Stadium • Kansas City, MO	L 17–20
August 29	Baylor	Auburn	SEC	McLane Stadium • Waco, TX	L 24–38
August 29	Colorado	Georgia Tech	ACC	Folsom Field • Boulder, CO	L 20–27
August 30	Utah	UCLA	Big Ten	Rose Bowl • Pasadena, CA	W 43–10
September 1	TCU	North Carolina	ACC	Kenan Memorial Stadium • Chapel Hill, NC	W 48–14
September 6	Baylor	No. 17 SMU	ACC	Gerald J. Ford Stadium • Dallas, TX	W 48–45^{2OT}
September 6	BYU	Stanford	ACC	LaVell Edwards Stadium • Provo, UT	W 27–3
September 6	No. 16 Iowa State	Iowa	Big Ten	Jack Trice Stadium • Ames, IA	W 16–13
September 6	Kansas	Missouri	SEC	Faurot Field • Columbia, MO (Border War)	L 31–42
September 6	No. 12 Arizona State	Mississippi State	SEC	Davis Wade Stadium • Starkville, MS	L 20–24
September 6	Oklahoma State	No. 6 Oregon	Big Ten	Autzen Stadium • Eugene, OR	L 3–69
September 13	Pittsburgh	West Virginia	ACC	Milan Puskar Stadium • Morgantown, WV (Backyard Brawl)	W 31–24 ^{OT}
September 20	SMU	TCU	ACC	Amon G. Carter Stadium • Fort Worth, TX	W 35–24
September 20	North Carolina	UCF	ACC	Acrisure Bounce House • Orlando, FL	W 34–9

=== Big 12 vs. Group of Five matchups ===
The following games include Big 12 teams competing against teams from The American, CUSA, MAC, Mountain West, Pac-12 or Sun Belt.

Date	Conference	Visitor	Home	Site	Score
August 23	Mountain West	Fresno State	Kansas	David Booth Kansas Memorial Stadium • Lawrence, KS	W 31–7
August 28	CUSA	Jacksonville State	UCF	Acrisure Bounce House • Orlando, FL	W 17–10
August 30	Mountain West	Hawaii	Arizona	Arizona Stadium • Tucson, AZ	W 40–6
September 6	MAC	Kent State	No. 24 Texas Tech	Jones AT&T Stadium • Lubbock, TX	W 62–14
September 6	MAC	Bowling Green	Cincinnati	Nippert Stadium • Cincinnati, OH	W 34–20
September 6	CUSA	Delaware	Colorado	Folsom Field • Boulder, CO	W 31–7
September 6	The American	Rice	Houston	Rice Stadium • Houston, TX (rivalry)	W 35–9
September 6	MAC	West Virginia	Ohio	Peden Stadium • Athens, OH	L 10–17
September 6	The American	Army	Kansas State	Bill Snyder Family Football Stadium • Manhattan, KS	L 21–24
September 13	Sun Belt	No. 14 Iowa State	Arkansas State	Centennial Bank Stadium • Jonesboro, AR	W 24–16
September 13	Sun Belt	Texas State	Arizona State	Mountain America Stadium • Tempe, AZ	W 34–15
September 13	Pac-12	Oregon State	No. 21 Texas Tech	Jones AT&T Stadium • Lubbock, TX	W 45–14
September 13	Mountain West	No. 20 Utah	Wyoming	War Memorial Stadium • Laramie, WY	W 31–6
September 19	The American	Tulsa	Oklahoma State	Boone Pickens Stadium • Stillwater, OK (rivalry)	L 12–19
September 20	The American	BYU	East Carolina	Dowdy–Ficklen Stadium • Greenville, NC	W 34–13
September 20	Mountain West	Wyoming	Colorado	Folsom Field • Boulder, CO	W 37–20
September 26	Pac-12	Houston	Oregon State	Reser Stadium • Corvallis, OR	W 27–24^{OT}

=== Big 12 vs. FCS matchups ===
The Football Championship Subdivision comprises 13 conferences and two independent programs.

Date	Conference	Visitor	Home	Site	Score
August 28	OVC–Big South	UT Martin	Oklahoma State	Boone Pickens Stadium • Stillwater, OK	W 27–7
August 28	Southland	No. 23 Stephen F. Austin	Houston	Space City Financial Stadium • Houston, TX	W 27–0
August 29	Northeast	Wagner	Kansas	David Booth Kansas Memorial Stadium • Lawrence, KS	W 46–7
August 30	Northeast	Robert Morris	West Virginia	Milan Puskar Stadium • Morgantown, WV	W 45–3
August 30	Missouri Valley	No. 4 South Dakota	No. 22 Iowa State	Jack Trice Stadium • Ames, IA	W 55–7
August 30	Missouri Valley	North Dakota	No. 17 Kansas State	Bill Snyder Family Football Stadium • Manhattan, KS	W 38–35
August 30	SWAC	Arkansas–Pine Bluff	No. 23 Texas Tech	Jones AT&T Stadium • Lubbock, TX	W 67–7
August 30	Big Sky	Portland State	BYU	LaVell Edwards Stadium • Provo, UT	W 69–0
August 30	Big Sky	No. 19 Northern Arizona	No. 11 Arizona State	Mountain America Stadium • Tempe, AZ	W 38–19
September 6	Big Sky	Cal Poly	No. 25 Utah	Rice–Eccles Stadium • Salt Lake City, UT	W 63–9
September 6	Big Sky	Weber State	Arizona	Arizona Stadium • Tucson, AZ	W 48–3
September 6	CAA	North Carolina A&T	UCF	Acrisure Bounce House • Orlando, FL	W 68–7
September 13	SoCon	Samford	Baylor	McLane Stadium • Waco, TX	W 42–7
September 13	Southland	Northwestern State	Cincinnati	Nippert Stadium • Cincinnati, OH	W 70–0
September 13	UAC	Abilene Christian	TCU	Amon G. Carter Stadium • Fort Worth, TX	W 42–21

Note:† Denotes Neutral Site Game

=== Record vs. other conferences ===
Regular Season

Power 4 Conferences	Record
ACC	6–1
Big Ten	2–2
SEC	0–3
Power 4 Total	8–6
Other FBS Conferences	Record
American	2–2
CUSA	2–0
Independents (Excluding Notre Dame)	0–0
MAC	2–1
Mountain West	4–0
Pac-12	2–0
Sun Belt	2–0
Other FBS Total	14–3
FCS Opponents	Record
Football Championship Subdivision	15–0
Total Non-Conference Record	37–9

Post Season

Power 4 Conferences	Record
ACC	1–2
Big Ten	2–1
SEC	1–0
Power 4 Total	4–3
Other FBS Conferences	Record
American	0–1
Other FBS Total	0–0
Total Bowl Record	4–4

== Television Selections ==
The Big 12 Conference has television contracts with ESPN and FOX, which allow games to be broadcast across ABC, ESPN, ESPN2, ESPNU, FOX, FS1 and FS2 and TNT Sports. Streaming broadcasts for games under Big 12 control are streamed on ESPN+. Games under the control of other conferences fall under the contracts of the opposing conference.

Network	Wk 0	Wk 1	Wk 2	Wk 3	Wk 4	Wk 5	Wk 6	Wk 7	Wk 8	Wk 9	Wk 10	Wk 11	Wk 12	Wk 13	Wk 14	C	Bowls	NCG	Totals
ABC	–	–	–	–	–	–	–	–	–	–	–	1	–	–	–	1	1	–	3
ESPN	1	3	2	2	2	3	2	2	–	1	1	–	1	–	2	–	5	–	27
ESPN2	–	–	2	1	2	1	2	1	2	2	–	1	1	2	1	–	–	–	18
ESPNU	–	–	1	–	–	–	–	–	–	1	1	-	1	–	1	–	–	–	5
FOX	1	3	2	2	3	2	1	2	2	1	1	1	1	2	2	-	1	–	27
FS1	–	–	–	–	1	1	–	1	1	–	2	1	1	1	1	–	–	–	10
CBS	–	–	1	–	–	–	–	–	–	–	–	–	–	–	–	–	1	–	2
The CW	–	–	1	–	–	–	–	–	–	–	–	–	–	–	–	–	–	–	1
CBS Sports Network	–	–	–	1	-	–	–	–	–	–	–	–	–	–	–	–	–	–	1
SEC Network	–	–	–	–	–	–	–	–	–	–	–	–	–	–	–	–	–	–	-
TNT	–	1	1	1	–	1	1	1	1	1	1	1	1	1	1	–	–	-	13
ESPN+/TNT Max(streaming)	–	9	5	3	–	–	1	–	–	1	1	–	–	1	–	–	–	-	21

Platform	Games
Broadcast	75
Cable	32
Streaming	21

== Awards and honors ==
=== Players of the week ===
Week	Offensive			Defensive			Special Teams			Freshman			Offensive Line	Defensive Line
Week	Player	Team	Position	Player	Team	Position	Player	Team	Position	Player	Team	Position	Team	
Week 0	Jalon Daniels	Kansas	QB	Marcus Neal Jr.	Iowa State	DB	Aiden Flora	Iowa State	PR	Dominic Overby	Iowa State	WR	Kansas	Iowa State
Week 1	Rocco Becht; Devon Dampier	Iowa State; Utah	QB	Bud Clark; Jake Golday	TCU; Cincinnati	DB; LB	Kanyon Floyd; Kyle Konrardy	Arizona State; Iowa State	P K	Bear Bachmeier	BYU	QB	Utah	
Week 2	Jaden Nixon; Sawyer Robertson	UCF; Baylor	RB; QB	Skyler Gill-Howard; Tamatoa McDonough	Texas Tech; Iowa State	DL	Connor Hawkins; Kyle Konrardy (2)	Baylor; Iowa State	K	Connor Hawkins	Baylor	K	Cincinnati	Iowa State (2)
Week 3	Ismail Mahdi; Brendan Sorsby	Arizona; Cincinnati	RB; QB	Jordan Crook; Brice Pollock	Arizona State; Texas Tech	LB; DB	Ethan Sanchez; Palmer Williams	Houston; Baylor	K P	Ed Small	TCU	WR	Arizona	West Virginia
Week 4	Will Hammond; Eric McAlister	Texas Tech; TCU	QB; WR	Jamel Johnson; Jacob Rodriguez	TCU; Texas Tech	DB; LB	Jesús Gómez; Emmanuel Henderson	Arizona State; Kansas	K KR	Will Hammond	Texas Tech	QB	UCF	Texas Tech
Week 5	Sawyer Robertson (2); Brendan Sorsby (2)	Baylor; Cincinnati	QB; QB	Prince Dorbah; Sione Fotu	Arizona State; Houston	DL; LB	Jesús Gómez (2); Stephen Rusnak	Arizona State; Cincinnati	K	Bear Bachmeier (2)	BYU	QB	Cincinnati (2)	Arizona State
Week 6	Noah Fifita; Josh Hoover	Arizona; TCU	QB	Jake Golday (2); Namdi Obiazor	Cincinnati; TCU	LB	Stone Harrington; Connor Hawkins (2)	Texas Tech; Baylor	K	Bear Bachmeier (3)	BYU	QB	Cincinnati (3)	Texas Tech (2)
Week 7	Cameron Dickey; LJ Martin	Texas Tech; BYU	RB	David Bailey; Des Purnell	Texas Tech; Kansas State	DL; LB	Max Fletcher; Ethan Sanchez (2)	Cincinnati; Houston	P K	Bear Bachmeier (4)	BYU	QB	Utah (2)	Texas Tech (3)
Week 8	Jordyn Tyson; Conner Weigman	Arizona State; Houston	WR; QB	Kaleb Elarms-Orr; Tanner Wall	TCU; BYU	LB; DB	Jesús Gómez (3); Ethan Sanchez (3)	Arizona State; Houston	K	Bear Bachmeier (5)	BYU	QB	Houston	UCF
Week 9	Byrd Ficklin; Conner Weigman (2)	Utah; Houston	QB	Faletau Satuala; Eddie Walls III	BYU; Houston	S DL	Nate McCashland; J'Koby Williams	TCU; Texas Tech	K KR	Byrd Ficklin	Utah	QB	Utah (3)	Houston
Week 10	Noah Fifita (2); Jeff Sims	Arizona; Arizona State	QB	Fred Perry; Jacob Rodriguez (2)	West Virginia; Texas Tech	DB; LB	Mana Carvalho; Stone Harrington (2)	Utah; Texas Tech	KR; K	Scotty Fox Jr.	West Virginia	QB	Arizona State	Utah (2)
Week 11	Quincy Craig; Cameron Dickey	Arizona; Texas Tech	QB; RB	Phillip Dunnam; Jacob Rodriguez (3)	UCF; Texas Tech	DB; LB	Aiden Flora (2); Stone Harrington (2)	Iowa State; Texas Tech	KR; K	Diore Hubbard	West Virginia	RB	Iowa State	Texas Tech (4)
Week 12	Bear Bachmeier; Jeff Sims (2)	BYU; Arizona State	QB; QB	Jordan Crook (2); Jacob Rodriguez (4)	Arizona State; Texas Tech	LB; LB	Will Ferrin; Jesús Gómez (4)	BYU; Arizona State	K	Byrd Ficklin (2)	Utah	RB	Utah (4)	BYU
Week 13	Joe Jackson; LJ Martin	Kansas State; BYU	RB	Will James; Dalton Johnson	Houston; Arizona	DB	Kyle Konrardy; Noe Ruelas	Iowa State; UCF	K	Bear Bachmeier (6)	BYU	QB	Kansas State	BYU (2)
Week 14	Jeremy Payne; Conner Weigman (3)	TCU; Houston	RB; QB	Caleb Bacon; Dalton Johnson (2)	Iowa State; Arizona	LB; DB	Parker Kingston	BYU	KR	Bear Bachmeier (7)	BYU	QB	TCU	Texas Tech (5)

==== Totals per school ====
School	Total
Texas Tech	18
BYU	14
Iowa State	13
Arizona State	12
Utah	11
Houston	9
TCU	8
Cincinnati	7
Arizona	6
Baylor	5
UCF	4
West Virginia	4
Kansas	3
Kansas State	3
Colorado	0
Oklahoma State	0

=== Big 12 individual awards ===
The following individuals received postseason honors as voted by the Big 12 Conference coaches at the end of the season.

Award	Player	School
Offensive Player of the Year	LJ Martin	BYU
Defensive Player of the Year	Jacob Rodriguez	Texas Tech
Special Teams Player of the Year	Palmer Williams	Baylor
Offensive Freshman of the Year	Bear Bachmeier	BYU
Offensive Lineman of the Year	Spencer Fano	Utah
Defensive Freshman of the Year	Wendell Gregory	Oklahoma State
Defensive Lineman of the Year	David Bailey	Texas Tech
Offensive Newcomer of the Year	Devon Dampier	Utah
Defensive Newcomer of the Year	David Bailey	Texas Tech
Chuck Neinas Coach of the Year	Kalani Sitake	BYU
# - Unanimous choice

=== All-Americans ===
Currently, the NCAA compiles consensus all-America teams in the sports of Division I-FBS football and Division I men's basketball using a point system computed from All-America teams named by coaches associations or media sources. The system consists of three points for a first-team honor, two points for second-team honor, and one point for third-team honor. Honorable mention and fourth team or lower recognitions are not accorded any points. College Football All-American consensus teams are compiled by position and the player accumulating the most points at each position is named first team consensus all-American. Currently, the NCAA recognizes All-Americans selected by the AP, AFCA, FWAA, TSN, and the WCFF to determine Consensus and Unanimous All-Americans. Any player named to the First Team by all five of the NCAA-recognized selectors is deemed a Unanimous All-American.

Position	Player	School	Selector	Unanimous	Consensus
First Team All-Americans
DE	David Bailey	Texas Tech	AFCA, AP, FWAA, TSN, WCFF, The Athletic, CBS, PFF, SI, USAT	✓	
LB	Jacob Rodriguez	Texas Tech	AFCA, AP, FWAA, TSN, WCFF, The Athletic, CBS, PFF, SI, USAT	✓	
OT	Spencer Fano	Utah	AFCA, AP, FWAA, TSN, WCFF, The Athletic, CBS, SI, USAT	✓	
DE	John Henry Daley	Utah	WCFF		
ST	Micah Gifford	Baylor	PFF		
DT	A.J. Holmes Jr.	Texas Tech	PFF		
DT	Lee Hunter	Texas Tech	The Athletic		

Position	Player	School	Selector	Unanimous	Consensus
Second Team All-Americans
DE	John Henry Daley	Utah	AFCA, FWAA, AP, SI		✓
TE	Michael Trigg	Baylor	AFCA, TSN, The Athletic, USAT		
WR	Garrison Grimes	BYU	AFCA		
DT	A.J. Holmes Jr.	Texas Tech	AP		
DT	Lee Hunter	Texas Tech	FWAA, SI, USAT		
DB	Faletau Satuala	BYU	FWAA		
WR	Eric McAlister	TCU	TSN		
CB	Treydan Stukes	Arizona	TSN		
WR	Jordyn Tyson	Arizona State	AFCA		

Position	Player	School	Selector	Unanimous	Consensus
Third Team All-Americans\
DT	Lee Hunter	Cincinnati	AP		
CB	Treydan Stukes	Arizona	AP		
OG	Evan Tengesdahl	Cincinnati	AP		
TE	Michael Trigg	Baylor	AP		
WR	Jordyn Tyson	Arizona State	AP		

==== List of All American Teams ====
- 2025 AFCA All-America Team
- 2025 Associated Press All-America Team
- 2025 FWAA All-America Team
- Sporting News 2025 College Football All-America Team
- Walter Camp Football Foundation 2025 All-America Team
- 2025 The Athletic All-America Team
- 2025 Athlon Sports College Football's Postseason All-America Team
- 2025 CBS Sports All-America Team
- 2025 College Football News
- 2025 ESPN All-America Team
- 2025 Fox Sports All-America Team
- 2025 PFF College All-America team
- 2025 Phil Steele’s Postseason All-America Team
- Sports Illustrated 2025 All-America Team
- USA Today 2025 All-America Team

=== All-conference teams ===
The following players earned All-Big 12 honors. Any teams showing (_) following their name are indicating the number of All-Big 12 Conference Honors awarded to that university for 1st team and 2nd team respectively.

First Team

Position	Player	Class	Team
First Team Offense
QB	Noah Fifita	(redshirt) Jr	Arizona
RB	Raleek Brown	Jr	Arizona State
RB	LJ Martin	Jr	BYU
WR	Jordyn Tyson†	(redshirt) Jr	Arizona State
WR	Josh Cameron	(redshirt) Jr	Baylor
WR	Amare Thomas	Jr	Houston
WR	Eric McAlister	Sr	TCU
TE/FLEX	Michael Trigg	(redshirt) Sr	Baylor
TE/FLEX	Tanner Koziol	Sr	Houston
OL	Omar Aigbedion	Sr	Baylor
OL	Bruce Mitchell	(redshirt) Jr	BYU
OL	Sam Hecht	Sr	Kansas State
OL	Spencer Fano†	Jr	Utah
OL	Caleb Lomu	(redshirt) So	Utah
First Team Defense
DL	Malachi Lawrence	(redshirt) Sr	UCF
DL	David Bailey	Sr	Texas Tech
DL	Romello Height	Sr	Texas Tech
DL	Lee Hunter	Sr	Texas Tech
DL	John Henry Daley	(redshirt) So	Utah
LB	Jack Kelly	(redshirt) Sr	BYU
LB	Jake Golday	(redshirt) Sr	Cincinnati
LB	Kaleb Elarms-Orr	Sr	TCU
LB	Jacob Rodriguez†	Sr	Texas Tech
DB	Dalton Johnson	(redshirt) Sr	Arizona
DB	Treydan Stukes	(redshirt) Sr	Arizona
DB	Keith Abney II	Jr	Arizona State
DB	Tanner Wall	(redshirt) Sr	BYU
DB	Brice Pollock	Jr	Texas Tech
First Team Special Teams
PK	Stone Harrington	Jr	Texas Tech
P	Palmer Williams†	Jr	Baylor
P	Wes Pahl	Jr	Oklahoma State
RS	Emmanuel Henderson	Sr	Kansas
Specialist	Micah Gifford	Jr	Baylor

Second Team

Position	Player	Class	Team
Second Team Offense
QB	Brendan Sorsby	(redshirt) Jr	Cincinnati
RB	Carson Hansen	Jr	Iowa State
RB	Cameron Dickey	So	Texas Tech
WR	Parker Kingston	(redshirt) Jr	BYU
WR	Cyrus Allen	Sr	Cincinnati
WR	Omarion Miller	Jr	Colorado
WR	Caleb Douglas	Sr	Texas Tech
TE/FLEX	Benjamin Brahmer	Jr	Iowa State
TE/FLEX	Terrance Carter Jr.	Jr	Texas Tech
OL	Max Iheanachor	(redshirt) Sr	Arizona State
OL	Joe Cotton	(redshirt) Jr	Cincinnati
OL	Evan Tengesdahl	(redshirt) So	Cincinnati
OL	Jordan Seaton	So	Colorado
OL	John Pastore	Jr	Kansas State
Second Team Defense
DL	Dontay Corleone	(redshirt) Sr	Cincinnati
DL	Carlos Allen Jr.	Sr	Houston
DL	Eddie Walls III	Sr	Houston
DL	Devean Deal	Sr	TCU
DL	Logan Fano	(redshirt) Jr	Utah
LB	Jordan Crook	Sr	Arizona State
LB	Keyshaun Elliott	Sr	Arizona State
LB	Keaton Thomas	(redshirt) Jr	Baylor
LB	Austin Romaine	Jr	Kansas State
DB	Will James	So	Houston
DB	Latrell McCutchin Sr.	Sr	Houston
DB	Bud Clark	Sr	TCU
DB	Jamel Johnson	Jr	TCU
DB	Smith Snowden	Jr	Utah
Second Team Special Teams
PK	Will Ferrin	(redshirt) Sr	BYU
P	Max Fletcher	(redshirt) Jr	Cincinnati
RS	Parker Kingston	(redshirt) Jr	BYU
Specialist	Jacob Garza	Sr	Houston
Specialist	Aiden Flora	(redshirt) Fr	Iowa State

Third Team

Position	Player	Class	Team
Third Team Offense
QB	Devon Dampier	Jr	Utah
RB	Joe Jackson	So	Kansas State
RB	Wayshawn Parker	So	Utah
WR	Kris Hutson	(redshirt) Sr	Arizona
WR	Chase Roberts	(redshirt) Sr	BYU
WR	Emmanuel Henderson	Sr	Kansas
WR	Jayce Brown	Jr	Kansas State
TE/FLEX	Joe Royer	(redshirt) Sr	Cincinnati
TE/FLEX	Dallen Bentley	Sr	Utah
OL	Isaiah Jatta	(redshirt) Sr	BYU
OL	Gavin Gerhardt	(redshirt) Sr	Cincinnati
OL	Tyler Miller	(redshirt) Sr	Iowa State
OL	Howard Sampson	Jr	Texas Tech
OL	Sheridan Wilson	Jr	Texas Tech
Third Team Defense
DL	Prince Dorbah	(redshirt) Sr	Arizona State
DL	Justin Wodtly	Sr	Iowa State
DL	Domonique Orange	(redshirt) Fr	Oklahoma State
DL	Wendell Gregory	Sr	TCU
DL	A.J. Holmes Jr.	Jr	Texas Tech
LB	Taye Brown	Jr	Arizona
LB	Isaiah Glasker	(redshirt) Jr	BYU
LB	Cole Kozlowski	Sr	UCF
LB	Ben Roberts	Jr	Texas Tech
DB	Jay'Vion Cole	(redshirt) Jr	Arizona
DB	Genesis Smith	(redshirt) Sr	Arizona
DB	Myles Rowser	Sr	Arizona State
DB	Faletau Satuala	So	BYU
DB	Marcus Neal Jr.	So	Iowa State
Third Team Special Teams
PK	Noe Ruelas	(redshirt) Sr	UCF
P	Laith Marjan	(redshirt) Sr	Kansas
RS	J'Koby Williams	So	Texas Tech
Specialist	Bryce Ramirez	Sr	Texas Tech

Notes:

- RS = Return Specialist
- AP/ST = All-Purpose/Special Teams Player (not a kicker or returner)
- † Two-time first team selection;
- ‡ Three-time first team selection

Honorable mentions

- Arizona: Ty Buchanan (OL), Jay'Vion Cole (DNOY), Noah Fifita (OPOY), Dalton Johnson (DPOY), Ismail Mahdi (RB), Deshawn McKnight (DL), Mays Pese (DFOY), Tiaoalii Savea (DL), Tre Spivey (WR), Javin Whatley (WR)
- Arizona State: Derek Eusebio (WR), Max Iheanachor (OLOY), Jesus Gomez (PK), Chamon Metayer (TE/FLEX), Jordyn Tyson (OPOY)
- Baylor: Devyn Bobby (DB), Josh Cameron (Returner), Connor Hawkins (PK), Ryan Lengyel (OL), Jackie Marshall (DL), Coleton Price (OL), Jacob Redding (DB), Sawyer Robertson (OPOY, QB), LeVar Thornton Jr. (DB)
- BYU: Tausili Akana (DNOY), Bear Bachmeier (QB), Hunter Clegg (DFOY), Will Ferrin (STPOY), Andrew Gentry (ONOY), Garrison Grimes (Specialist), Evan Johnson (DB), Jack Kelly (DPOY), Bruce Mitchell (OLOY), Carsen Ryan (TE/FLEX), Bodie Schoonover (DL), Keanu Tanuvasa (DL), John Taumoepeau (DL)
- Cincinnati: Cyrus Allen (ONOY), Jeff Caldwell (WR), Gavin Gerhardt (OLOY), Jalen Hunt (DL), Jaden Nixon (Returner), Antwan Peek Jr. (DB), Brendan Sorsby (OPOY), Tawee Walker (RB)
- Colorado: Tawfiq Byard (DB), Preston Hodge (DB), Damon Greaves (P), London Merritt (DFOY)
- Houston: Wrook Brown (DB), Dean Connors (RB), Tanner Koziol (ONOY), Ethan Sanchez (STPOY, PK), Eddie Walls III (DNOY)
- Iowa State: Jim Bonifas (OL), Trevor Buhr (OL), Brett Eskildsen (WR), Kyle Konrardy (STPOY, Specialist), Tyler Perkins (P), Abu Sama III (RB), Chase Sowell (ONOY, WR)
- Kansas: Kobe Baynes (OL), Enrique Cruz Jr. (OL), Boden Groen (TE/FELX), Leroy Harris III (DL), Emmanuel Henderson (ONOY), Daniel Hishaw Jr. (RB), Bryce Foster (OL
- Kansas State: Sam Hecht (OLOY), Damian Ilalio (DL), Garrett Oakley (TE/FLEX), Chiddi Obiazor (DL), VJ Payne (DB), Zashon Rich (DB), Cody Stufflebean (DL), Jaron Tibbs (WR)
- Oklahoma State: Bob Schick (OL)
- TCU: Devean Deal (DLOY), Eric McAlister (OPOY)
- Texas Tech: Davion Carter (OL), John Curry (DB), Coy Eakin (WR), Stone Harrington (STPOY), Behren Morton (QB), Jacob Ponton (OL), Reggie Virgil (ONOY, WR), J'Koby Williams (RB), Cole Wisniewski (DB)
- UCF: Jayden Bellamy (DB), Phillip Dunnam (DB), RJ Jackson Jr. (DL), Nyjalik Kelly (DL), Cole Kozlowski (DNOY) Malachi Lawrence (DLOY), Noe Ruelas (STPOY), Duane Thomas Jr. (WR), Dylan Wade (TE/FLEX)
- Utah: Jackson Bennee (DB), Logan Castor (Specialist), Mana Carvalho (Returner), John Henry Daley (DPOY, DLOY), Devon Dampier (OPOY), Ryan Davis (WR), Byrd Ficklin (OFOY), Jaren Kump (OL), Michael Mokofisi (OL), Tanoa Togiai (OL)
- West Virginia: Scotty Fox Jr. (OFOY), Nick Krahe (OL), Fred Perry (DNOY), Edward Vesterinen (DL)

=== National award winners ===
2025 College Football Award Winners

Award	Player	School

== Rankings ==
Legend
	Improvement in ranking
	Drop in ranking
	Not ranked previous week
	No change in ranking from previous week
RV	Received votes but were not ranked in Top 25 of poll
т	Tied with team above or below also with this symbol

		Pre	Wk 1	Wk 2	Wk 3	Wk 4	Wk 5	Wk 6	Wk 7	Wk 8	Wk 9	Wk 10	Wk 11	Wk 12	Wk 13	Wk 14	Wk 15	Final
Arizona	AP													RV	RV	22	21	RV
Arizona	C												RV	RV	RV	22	20	
Arizona	CFP	Not released													25	18	17	
Arizona State	AP	11	12	RV	RV	RV	25	21		24		RV	RV	RV	RV	RV	RV	
Arizona State	C	11	10	24	RV	RV	24	23	RV	25	RV	RV	RV	RV	RV	RV	RV	
Arizona State	CFP	Not released												25	20			
Baylor	AP	RV	RV	RV	RV													
Baylor	C	RV		RV	RV													
Baylor	CFP	Not released																
BYU	AP	RV	RV	RV	RV	25	23	18	15	11	10	8	12	11	11	11	12	11
BYU	C	22	25	25	RV	24	23	18	14	10	10	8	12т	11	11	11	13	
BYU	CFP	Not released										7	13	11	11	11	12	
Cincinnati	AP							RV	24	21	17	25	22					
Cincinnati	C	RV						RV	24	21	16	25	22					
Cincinnati	CFP	Not released											25					
Colorado	AP	RV																
Colorado	C	RV																
Colorado	CFP	Not released																
Houston	AP									RV	22	RV	RV	25		RV	RV	22
Houston	C				RV	RV	RV		RV	RV	22	RV	RV	24	RV	RV	24	
Houston	CFP	Not released												23		21	21	
Iowa State	AP	22	16	14	12	14	14	22								RV		
Iowa State	C	21т	18	14	13	13	12	21	RV									
Iowa State	CFP	Not released																
Kansas	AP																	
Kansas	C	RV	RV	RV		RV												
Kansas	CFP	Not released																
Kansas State	AP	17	RV															
Kansas State	C	20	RV															
Kansas State	CFP	Not released																
Oklahoma State	AP																	
Oklahoma State	C																	
Oklahoma State	CFP	Not released																
TCU	AP	RV	RV	RV	RV	24	RV	RV		RV							RV	25
TCU	C	RV	RV	RV	RV	25	RV	RV	RV	RV	RV	RV				RV	RV	
TCU	CFP	Not released																
Texas Tech	AP	23	24	21	17	12	11	9	7	14	13	9	8	6	7	5	4	7
Texas Tech	C	24	23	20	16	14	14	10	8	15	13	9	8	7	7	6	4	
Texas Tech	CFP	Not released										8	6	5	5	4	4	
UCF	AP					RV												
UCF	C																	
UCF	CFP	Not released																
Utah	AP	RV	25	20	16	RV	RV	RV	23	RV	24	17	15	13	14	15	15	14
Utah	C	RV	RV	21	18	RV	25	RV	22	RV	24	19	15	14	14	15	15	
Utah	CFP	Not released										13	13	12	13	15	15	
West Virginia	AP																	
West Virginia	C																	
West Virginia	CFP	Not released																

== Home game announced attendance ==
Team	Stadium	Capacity	Game 1	Game 2	Game 3	Game 4	Game 5	Game 6	Game 7	Total	Average	% of capacity
Arizona	Casino Del Sol Stadium	50,782	42,423	40,038	40,051	40,685	47,960†	41,115	40,199	292,471	41,782	82.27%
Arizona State	Mountain America Stadium	53,599	**56,759**†	**54,005**	**53,774**	**54,177**	**54,256**	**54,101**	**54,034**	381,109	54,444	101.57%
Baylor	McLane Stadium	45,140	**45,233**†	41,215	40,964	35,596	40,212	38,186	34,720	276,126	39,447	87.38%
BYU	LaVell Edwards Stadium	62,073	**64,494**	**64,692**	**63,917**	**64,794**†	**64,447**	60,389		382,733	63,789	102.76%
Cincinnati	Nippert Stadium	38,088	35,421	30,014	38,007	35,782	38,007	37,099	38,034†	253,364	36,195	95.02%
Colorado	Folsom Field	50,183	**52,868**	**50,341**	**53,442**†	**52,265**	**52,698**	48,322	43,348	353,284	50,469	100.56%
Houston	TDECU Stadium	40,000	28,150	37,899	**42,806**†	28,535	25,049	30,852		193,291	32,215	80.53%
Iowa State	Jack Trice Stadium	61,500	**61,500**†	**61,500**†	**61,500**†	**61,500**†	60,889	58,275		365,164	60,861	98.96%
Kansas	David Booth Kansas Memorial Stadium	41,525	**41,525**†	39,129	40,320	**41,525**†	**41,525**†	38,211	32,811	275,046	39,292	94.62%
Kansas State	Bill Snyder Family Stadium	50,000	**51,927**	**52,723**	**53,013**†	**51,316**	**52,111**	49,549		310,639	51,773	103.54%
Oklahoma State	Boone Pickens Stadium	52,305	44,809	48,842†	45,689	44,941	46,901	46,340	35,127	311,650	44,664	85.39%
TCU	Amon G. Carter Stadium	47,000	**48,094**†	43,333	43,160	43,868	44,197	37,259		259,911	43,819	92.16%
Texas Tech	Jones AT&T Stadium	60,229	**60,229**†	**60,229**†	**60,229**†	**60,229**†	59,625	**60,229**†	**60,229**†	420,999	60,142	99.85%
UCF	FBC Mortgage Stadium	44,206	43,043	44,009	**44,206**†	43,229	43,445	**44,206**†	41,273	303,411	43,344	98.05%
Utah	Rice–Eccles Stadium	51,444	**51,463**	**52,236**†	**51,444**	**51,949**	**51,672**	**51,444**		309,208	51,535	100.17%
West Virginia	Milan Puskar Stadium	60,000	57,093	**62,108**†	53,965	54,110	55,510	44,250		327,036	54,506	90.84%
Total		50,505								5,016,630	47,777	94.59%

Bold – at or exceeded capacity
† Season high
‡ Record stadium Attendance

== NFL draft ==
The NFL draft was held at in Pittsburgh, Pennsylvania. The following list includes all thirty eight Big 12 players in the draft.

=== List of selections ===
Player	Position	School	Draft round	Round pick	Overall pick	Team
David Bailey	DE	Texas Tech	1	4	4	New York Jets
Jordyn Tyson	WR	Arizona State	1	7	7	New Orleans Saints
Spencer Fano	OT	Utah	1	8	8	New York Giants
Max Iheanachor	OT	Arizona State	1	21	21	Pittsburgh Steelers
Malachi Lawrence	DE	UCF	1	23	23	Dallas Cowboys
Caleb Lomu	OT	Utah	1	28	28	New England Patriots
Treydan Stukes	S	Arizona	2	6	38	Las Vegas Raiders
Jacob Rodriguez	LB	Texas Tech	2	11	43	Miami Dolphins
Lee Hunter	DT	Texas Tech	2	17	49	Carolina Panthers
Jake Golday	LB	Cincinnati	2	19	51	Carolina Panthers
Bud Clark	S	TCU	2	32	64	Seattle Seahawks
Romello Height	EDGE	Texas Tech	3	6	70	San Francisco 49ers
Caleb Douglas	WR	Texas Tech	3	11	75	Miami Dolphins
Domonique Orange	DT	Iowa State	3	18	82	Minnesota Vikings
Kaleb Elarms-Orr	LB	TCU	4	26	126	Buffalo Bills
Genesis Smith	S	Arizona	4	31	131	Los Angeles Chargers
Reggie Virgil	S	Texas Tech	5	3	143	Arizona Cardinals
Sam Hecht	C	Texas Tech	5	4	144	Carolina Panthers
Dalton Johnson	S	Arizona	5	10	150	Las Vegas Raiders
Keith Abney II	CB	Arizona State	5	17	157	Detroit Lions
Tanner Koziol	TE	Houston	5	24	164	Jacksonville Jaguars
Keyshaun Elliott	LB	Arizona State	5	26	166	Chicago Bears
Joe Royer	TE	Cincinnati	5	30	170	Cleveland Browns
Cyrus Allen	WR	Cincinnati	5	36	176	Kansas City Chiefs
Enrique Cruz Jr.	OT	Kansas	5	39	179	San Francisco 49ers
Josh Cameron	WR	Baylor	6	3	184	Tennessee Titans
Jackie Marshall	DT	Baylor	6	10	191	Jacksonville Jaguars
Jack Kelly	LB	BYU	6	12	193	New York Giants
Emmanuel Henderson	WR	Kansas	6	18	199	Seattle Seahawks
Skyler Gill-Howard	WR	Texas Tech	6	24	205	Detroit Lions
Namdi Obiazor	LB	TCU	6	31	212	New England Patriots
VJ Payne	S	Kansas State	7	12	228	New York Jets
Behren Morton	QB	Texas Tech	7	18	234	New England Patriots
Gavin Gerhardt	C	Cincinnati	7	19	235	Minnesota Vikings
Cole Wisniewski	S	Texas Tech	7	28	244	Philadelphia Eagles
Carsen Ryan	TE	BYU	7	32	248	Cleveland Browns
Michael Dansby	CB	Arizona	7	39	255	Seattle Seahawks
Dallen Bentley	TE	Utah	7	40	256	Denver Broncos

=== Total picks by school ===
Team	Round 1	Round 2	Round 3	Round 4	Round 5	Round 6	Round 7	Total
Arizona	0	1	0	1	1	0	1	4
Arizona State	2	0	0	0	2	0	0	4
Baylor	0	0	0	0	0	2	0	2
BYU	0	0	0	0	0	1	1	2
UCF	1	0	0	0	0	0	0	1
Cincinnati	0	1	0	0	2	0	1	4
Colorado	0	0	0	0	0	0	0	0
Houston	0	0	0	0	1	0	0	1
Iowa State	0	0	1	0	0	0	0	1
Kansas	0	0	0	0	1	1	0	2
Kansas State	0	0	0	0	1	0	1	2
Oklahoma State	0	0	0	0	0	0	0	0
TCU	0	1	0	0	0	1	0	2
Texas Tech	1	2	2	0	1	1	2	8
Utah	2	0	0	1	0	0	1	4
West Virginia	0	0	0	0	0	0	0	0
Total	6	5	3	2	9	6	7	38
