= Dalton Johnson =

American football player (born 2003)

No. 43 – Las Vegas Raiders
- Position: Safety
- Roster status: Active

Personal information
- Born: April 15, 2003 (age 23); Katy, Texas, U.S.
- Listed height: 5 ft 11 in (1.80 m)
- Listed weight: 198 lb (90 kg)

Career information
- High school: Katy (Katy, Texas)
- College: Arizona (2021–2025)
- NFL draft: 2026: 5th round, 150th overall pick

Career history
- Las Vegas Raiders (2026–present)

Awards and highlights
- First-team All-Big 12 (2025)

Career NFL statistics as of Week 4, 2026
- Games played: 1
- Stats at Pro Football Reference

Dalton Johnson (born April 15, 2003) is an American professional football safety for the Las Vegas Raiders of the National Football League (NFL). He previously played college football for the Arizona Wildcats and was selected by the Raiders in the fifth round of the 2026 NFL draft.

== Early life ==
Johnson attended Katy High School located in Katy, Texas. Coming out of high school, he was rated as a three-star recruit, where he committed to play college football for the Arizona Wildcats.

== College career ==
In his first two seasons in 2021 and 2022, he appeared in 13 games, where he recorded nine tackles. During the 2023 season, Johnson totaled 86 tackles and four forced fumbles. He finished the 2024 season starting in eleven games, where he finished with a team-leading 94 tackles. After the conclusion of the 2024 season, Johnson entered his name into the NCAA transfer portal, but later withdrew it and returned to play for the Wildcats for the 2025 season. In week seven, he recorded a key stop on a fake punt and an interception versus BYU. In week thirteen, Johnson recorded a career-high 18 tackles in a victory versus Baylor, where for his performance he was named the Big 12 defensive player of the week. In the 2025 regular season finale, he totaled three tackles, two pass deflections, an interception, and a forced fumble in a win over rival Arizona State, where he was once again named the Big-12 defensive player of the week. For his performance during the 2025 season, Johnson earned first team all-Big 12 honors.

== Professional career ==
Pre-draft measurables
Height	Weight	Arm length	Hand span	Wingspan	40-yard dash	10-yard split	20-yard split	20-yard shuttle	Three-cone drill	Vertical jump	Broad jump	Bench press
5 ft 10 7/8 in (1.80 m)	192 lb (87 kg)	30 7/8 in (0.78 m)	9 1/8 in (0.23 m)	6 ft 2 3/4 in (1.90 m)	4.41 s	1.59 s	2.61 s	4.53 s	7.07 s	36.0 in (0.91 m)	9 ft 11 in (3.02 m)	12 reps
All values from NFL Combine/Pro Day

Johnson was selected in the fifth round, 150th overall, of the 2026 NFL draft by the Las Vegas Raiders. The 150th selection originally belonged to the New Orleans Saints, which they traded to the Raiders in exchange for Tyree Wilson and the 219th overall pick (TJ Hall) on draft night. He was the 12th safety chosen.
