= Sam Hecht (American football) =

American football player (born 2003)

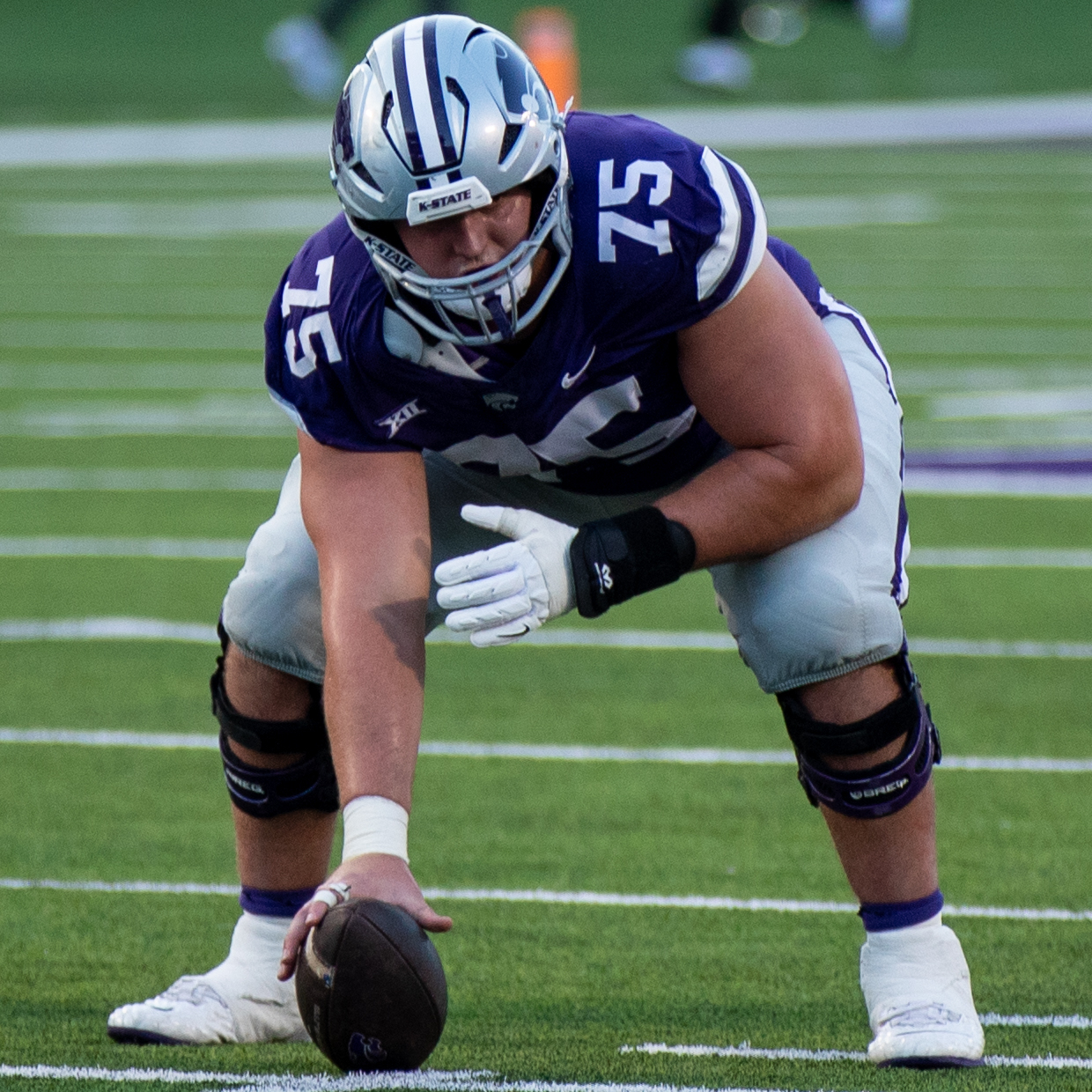
- Hecht with Kansas State in 2025

No. 75 – Carolina Panthers
- Position: Center
- Roster status: Active

Personal information
- Born: April 3, 2003 (age 23); Shawnee, Kansas, U.S.
- Listed height: 6 ft 4 in (1.93 m)
- Listed weight: 305 lb (138 kg)

Career information
- High school: Mill Valley (Shawnee)
- College: Kansas State (2021–2025)
- NFL draft: 2026: 5th round, 144th overall pick

Career history
- Carolina Panthers (2026–present)

Awards and highlights
- First-team All-Big 12 (2025); Second-team All-Big 12 (2024)

Career NFL statistics as of Week 4, 2026
- Games played: 4
- Stats at Pro Football Reference

Sam Hecht (born April 3, 2003) is an American professional football center for the Carolina Panthers of the National Football League (NFL). He played college football for the Kansas State Wildcats and was selected by the Panthers in the fifth round of the 2026 NFL draft.

== Career ==
Hecht attended Mill Valley High School in Shawnee, Kansas.

Hecht joined Kansas State University as a walk-on in 2021. After redshirting his first year in 2021, he played in 42 games with 25 starts at center from 2022 to 2025. As a senior in 2025, he was named first team All-Big 12. He did not allow a sack during his college career.

Hecht was selected to play in the 2026 Senior Bowl and was invited to the 2026 NFL Combine.

== Professional career ==
Pre-draft measurables
Height	Weight	Arm length	Hand span	Wingspan	40-yard dash	10-yard split	20-yard split	20-yard shuttle	Three-cone drill	Vertical jump	Broad jump	Bench press
6 ft 4 1/8 in (1.93 m)	303 lb (137 kg)	31 5/8 in (0.80 m)	9 7/8 in (0.25 m)	6 ft 4 7/8 in (1.95 m)	5.10 s	1.73 s	2.92 s	4.71 s	7.75 s	28.0 in (0.71 m)	8 ft 5 in (2.57 m)	20 reps
All values from NFL Combine/Pro Day

Hecht was selected by the Carolina Panthers in the fifth round with the 144th overall pick in the 2026 NFL draft.
