= Cyrus Allen =

American football player (born 2003)

No. 13 – Kansas City Chiefs
- Position: Wide receiver
- Roster status: Active

Personal information
- Born: February 11, 2003 (age 23)
- Listed height: 5 ft 11 in (1.80 m)
- Listed weight: 180 lb (82 kg)

Career information
- High school: Landry–Walker (New Orleans, Louisiana)
- College: Louisiana Tech (2021–2023); Texas A&M (2024); Cincinnati (2025)
- NFL draft: 2026: 5th round, 176th overall pick

Career history
- Kansas City Chiefs (2026–present)

Awards and highlights
- Second-team All-Big 12 (2025)
- Stats at Pro Football Reference

Cyrus Allen (born February 11, 2003) is an American professional football wide receiver for the Kansas City Chiefs of the National Football League (NFL). He played college football for the Louisiana Tech Bulldogs, Texas A&M Aggies and Cincinnati Bearcats. Allen was selected by the Chiefs in the fifth round of the 2026 NFL draft.

== Early life ==
Allen is from New Orleans, Louisiana. He attended Landry–Walker High School where he played football as a wide receiver, having his best season as a sophomore when he recorded 25 receptions for 458 yards and nine touchdowns. A three-star recruit, he committed to play college football for the Louisiana Tech Bulldogs.

== College career ==
After not playing in 2021, Allen posted 22 receptions for 500 yards and four touchdowns as a freshman at Louisiana Tech in 2022, leading all freshmen nationally with 10 scrimmage plays over 30 yards and ranking second with an average of 22.7 yards per catch. The following season, he caught 46 passes for 778 yards and four touchdowns. Allen transferred to the Texas A&M Aggies in 2024, having finished his stint at Louisiana Tech with 1,278 receiving yards and eight touchdowns. At Texas A&M, he started five games and was the team's third-leading receiver with 18 catches for 269 yards and a touchdown before suffering a season-ending arm injury.

Allen entered the NCAA transfer portal following the 2024 season and initially committed to the Tulane Green Wave before changing his commitment to the Cincinnati Bearcats for the 2025 season. He became the team's leading receiver and finished the season with 51 catches for 674 yards and 13 touchdowns, with his touchdowns leading the Big 12 Conference while tying the school record. He was invited to the 2026 Senior Bowl at the conclusion of his collegiate career.

== Professional career ==
Pre-draft measurables
Height	Weight	Arm length	Hand span	Wingspan	40-yard dash	10-yard split	20-yard split	20-yard shuttle	Three-cone drill	Vertical jump	Broad jump	Bench press
5 ft 11 1/4 in (1.81 m)	183 lb (83 kg)	30 7/8 in (0.78 m)	9 1/8 in (0.23 m)	6 ft 1 5/8 in (1.87 m)	4.51 s	1.56 s	2.57 s	4.17 s	6.90 s	36.0 in (0.91 m)	11 ft 0 in (3.35 m)	14 reps
All values from Pro Day

Allen was selected by the Kansas City Chiefs in the fifth round with the 176th overall pick in the 2026 NFL draft.
