= TJ Hall =

American football player (born 2004)

No. 34 – New Orleans Saints
- Position: Cornerback
- Roster status: Practice squad

Personal information
- Born: April 26, 2004 (age 22); Fresno, California, U.S.
- Listed height: 6 ft 1 in (1.85 m)
- Listed weight: 189 lb (86 kg)

Career information
- High school: San Joaquin Memorial (Fresno, California)
- College: Iowa (2022–2025)
- NFL draft: 2026: 7th round, 219th overall pick

Career history
- New Orleans Saints (2026–present)*
- * Offseason or practice squad member only
- Stats at Pro Football Reference

Terrence Javaughn Hall Jr. (born April 26, 2004) is an American professional football cornerback for the New Orleans Saints of the National Football League (NFL). He played college football for the Iowa Hawkeyes and was selected by the Saints in the seventh round of the 2026 NFL draft.

== Early life ==
Hall attended San Joaquin Memorial High School in Fresno, California. He was rated as a three-star recruit and committed to play college football for the Arizona Wildcats. He later flipped his commitment to the Washington Huskies. Finally, he signed to play for the Iowa Hawkeyes.

== College career ==
As a freshman in 2022, Hall appeared in all 13 games for the Hawkeyes. During the 2023 season, he played in just six games, notching five tackles before an injury ended his season. In the 2024 season opener, Hall got his first career start, where he allowed no receptions and recovered a fumble in a blowout 40–0 victory over Illinois State. He appeared in 12 games with seven starts that season, totaling 19 tackles, two pass deflections, an interception, and a fumble recovery. In week 2 of the 2025 season, Hall recorded three tackles and three pass deflections in a loss to rival Iowa State.

== Professional career ==
Pre-draft measurables
Height	Weight	Arm length	Hand span	Wingspan	40-yard dash	10-yard split	20-yard split	20-yard shuttle	Three-cone drill	Vertical jump	Broad jump	Bench press
6 ft 0 3/4 in (1.85 m)	189 lb (86 kg)	30 in (0.76 m)	9 1/2 in (0.24 m)	6 ft 2 3/8 in (1.89 m)	4.58 s	1.62 s	2.57 s	4.12 s	6.75 s	36.0 in (0.91 m)	10 ft 1 in (3.07 m)	12 reps
All values from NFL Combine/Pro Day

Hall was selected by the New Orleans Saints in the seventh round with the 219th overall pick of the 2026 NFL draft. The Saints received the selection and Tyree Wilson from the Las Vegas Raiders in exchange for the 150th overall pick (Dalton Johnson). On August 30, Hall was waived by the Saints as a part of final roster cuts; he was re–signed to the team's practice squad the following day.
