= Gavin Gerhardt =

American football player (born 2002)

Profile
- Position: Center

Personal information
- Born: March 21, 2002 (age 24); Xenia, Ohio, U.S.
- Listed height: 6 ft 4 in (1.93 m)
- Listed weight: 310 lb (141 kg)

Career information
- High school: Xenia
- College: Cincinnati (2020–2025)
- NFL draft: 2026: 7th round, 235th overall pick

Career history
- Minnesota Vikings (2026)*; Houston Texans (2026)*
- * Offseason or practice squad member only

Awards and highlights
- Third-team All-Big 12 (2025)
- Stats at Pro Football Reference

Gavin Gerhardt (born March 21, 2002) is an American professional football center. He played college football for the Cincinnati Bearcats and was selected by the Minnesota Vikings in the seventh round of the 2026 NFL draft.

== Early life ==
Gerhardt was a three-star recruit from Xenia High School in Xenia, Ohio. He helped lead the Buccaneers football team to an MVL championship in 2019 and their first playoff berth in school history. Gerhardt was named to the Division II All-Ohio First Team by the Ohio Prep Sportswriters Association, and was co-MVP for the team.

== College career ==
Gerhardt was redshirted his first year with Cincinnati in 2020. In 2021 he appeared in four games as a reserve offensive lineman. He became a starter as a sophomore and was a three-year team captain. In 2025 as a senior, Gerhardt started 13 games and was a third-team All-Big 12 selection. He was on the Rimington Award Watch List for nation’s best center, the Allstate Good Works Watch List and the Wuerffel Trophy Watch List. Gerhardt was a part of the offensive line that was named Big 12 Offensive Line of the Week three times during the season. Gerhardt declared for the 2026 NFL draft in January 2026.

== Professional career ==
Pre-draft measurables
Height	Weight	Arm length	Hand span	Wingspan	40-yard dash	10-yard split	20-yard split	20-yard shuttle	Three-cone drill	Vertical jump	Broad jump	Bench press
6 ft 4 3/8 in (1.94 m)	309 lb (140 kg)	32 1/2 in (0.83 m)	9 1/4 in (0.23 m)	6 ft 6 5/8 in (2.00 m)	5.21 s	1.84 s	3.03 s	4.67 s	7.65 s	25.5 in (0.65 m)	8 ft 7 in (2.62 m)	27 reps
All values from Pro Day

=== Minnesota Vikings ===
Gerhardt was selected by the Minnesota Vikings in the seventh round with the 235th overall pick in the 2026 NFL draft. On August 30, 2026, he was waived by the Vikings as a part of final roster cuts. Gerhardt was re–signed to the Vikings' practice squad the next day. Minnesota waived Gerhardt from the practice squad on September 2.

=== Houston Texans ===
On September 8, 2026, Gerhardt was signed to the Houston Texans' practice squad. He was released on October 13.
