= Bud Clark (American football) =

American football player (born 2002)

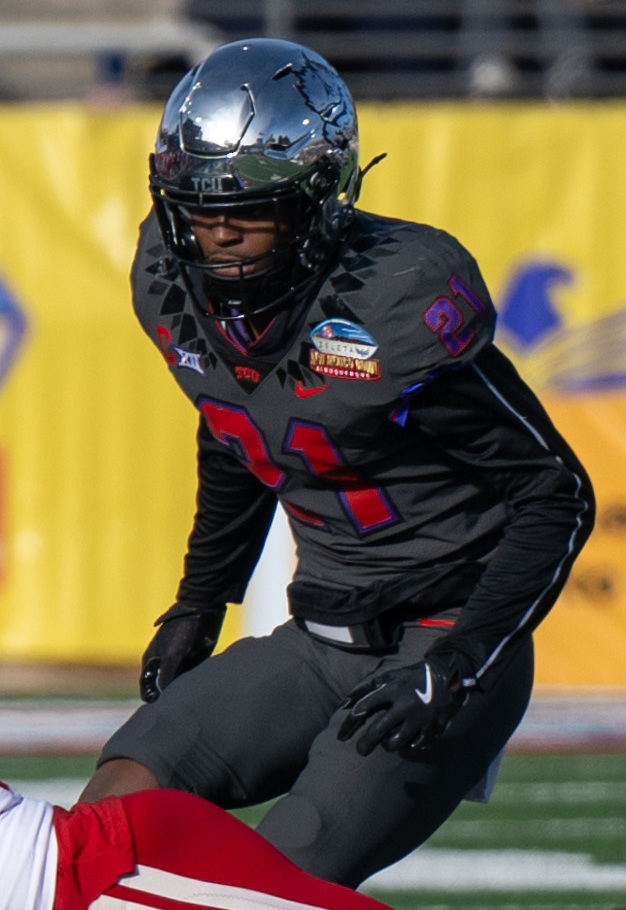
- Clark with TCU at the 2024 New Mexico Bowl

No. 9 – Seattle Seahawks
- Position: Safety
- Roster status: Injured reserve

Personal information
- Born: May 3, 2002 (age 24)
- Listed height: 6 ft 1 in (1.85 m)
- Listed weight: 188 lb (85 kg)

Career information
- High school: Alexandria (Alexandria, Louisiana)
- College: TCU (2020–2025)
- NFL draft: 2026: 2nd round, 64th overall pick

Career history
- Seattle Seahawks (2026–present)

Awards and highlights
- 2× Second-team All-Big 12 (2024, 2025)
- Stats at Pro Football Reference

Jadarius "Bud" Clark (born May 3, 2002) is an American professional football safety for the Seattle Seahawks of the National Football League (NFL). He played college football for the TCU Horned Frogs and was selected by the Seahawks in the second round of the 2026 NFL draft.

== Early life ==
Clark attended Alexandria High School in Alexandria, Louisiana, where he notched 42 tackles, with four going for a loss, six pass deflections, an interception, a forced fumble, and a fumble recovery. He committed to play college football at TCU after originally having committed to Virginia.

== College career ==
As a freshman in 2020, Clark recorded three tackles. In the 2021 season, he totaled ten tackles in three games. In week 7 of the 2022 season, Clark logged his first career interception in a double overtime win over #7 Oklahoma State. In week 12, Clark intercepted quarterback Blake Shapen to keep the game tied in a 29–28 win over Baylor. In TCU's semifinal playoff game against Michigan, Clark intercepted J. J. McCarthy and returned it 41 yards for the first score of the game. Clark also recorded a fumble recovery in the win. Clark finished his 2022 season with 45 tackles with one going for a loss, five pass deflections, five interceptions, a fumble recovery, and a touchdown, earning honorable mention all-Big 12 Conference honors. His five interceptions led the Horned Frogs in 2022. During the 2023 season, Clark tallied 21 solo tackles, five pass deflections, and three interceptions.

== Professional career ==
Pre-draft measurables
| Height | Weight | Arm length | Hand span | Wingspan | 40-yard dash | 10-yard split | 20-yard split | Vertical jump | Broad jump |
|---|---|---|---|---|---|---|---|---|---|
| 6 ft 0 7/8 in (1.85 m) | 188 lb (85 kg) | 31 1/2 in (0.80 m) | 9 in (0.23 m) | 6 ft 4 1/2 in (1.94 m) | 4.41 s | 1.56 s | 2.61 s | 38.0 in (0.97 m) | 10 ft 7 in (3.23 m) |
All values from NFL Combine

Clark was selected by the Seattle Seahawks in the second round with the 64th overall pick in the 2026 NFL draft. He was placed on season-ending injured reserve on August 25 after suffering a broken ankle in the team's second preseason game against the Tennessee Titans.

== Personal life ==
Bud’s son, Kenzo Clark, was born in 2023.
