= Jack Kelly (American football) =

American football player (born 2003)

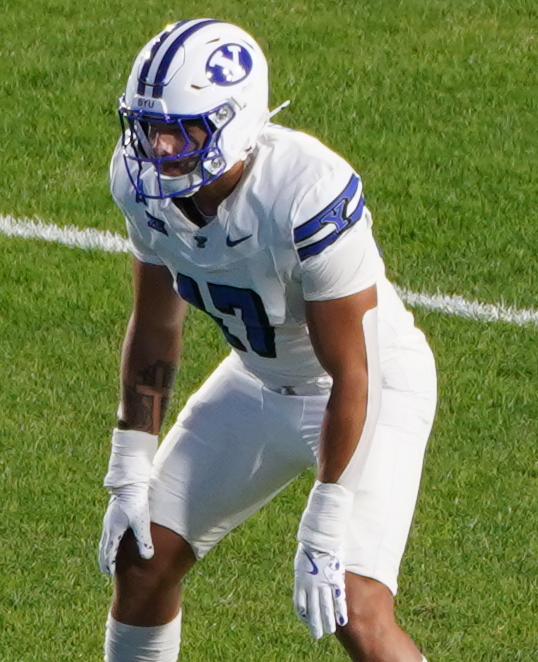
- Kelly in 2024

No. 51 – New York Giants
- Position: Linebacker
- Roster status: Active

Personal information
- Born: January 2, 2003 (age 23)
- Listed height: 6 ft 2 in (1.88 m)
- Listed weight: 240 lb (109 kg)

Career information
- High school: Kearns (Kearns, Utah)
- College: Weber State (2021–2023); BYU (2024–2025)
- NFL draft: 2026: 6th round, 193rd overall pick

Career history
- New York Giants (2026–present)

Awards and highlights
- First-team All-Big 12 (2025)

Career NFL statistics as of Week 4, 2026
- Tackles: 1
- Stats at Pro Football Reference

Jack Kelly (born January 2, 2003) is an American professional football linebacker for the New York Giants of the National Football League (NFL). He played college football for the Weber State Wildcats and the BYU Cougars and was selected by the Giants in the sixth round of the 2026 NFL draft.

== Early life ==
Kelly attended Kearns High School in Kearns, Utah. During his high school career he had 59 tackles with 4.5 sacks and two interceptions on defense and 66 receptions for 1,299 yards and 13 touchdowns on offense. He committed to Weber State University to play college football.

== College career ==
After playing in four games his true freshman year at Weber State in 2021, Kelly played in all 13 games and had 28 tackles and six sacks in 2022. As a sophomore in 2023, he had 56 tackles and led the Big Sky Conference with 10.5 sacks. Kelly entered the transfer portal after the season and transferred to Brigham Young University (BYU).

== Professional career ==
Pre-draft measurables
| Height | Weight | Arm length | Hand span | Wingspan | 40-yard dash | 10-yard split | 20-yard split | 20-yard shuttle | Three-cone drill | Vertical jump | Broad jump | Bench press |
|---|---|---|---|---|---|---|---|---|---|---|---|---|
| 6 ft 1 5/8 in (1.87 m) | 240 lb (109 kg) | 31 1/8 in (0.79 m) | 9 1/8 in (0.23 m) | 6 ft 5 3/8 in (1.97 m) | 4.57 s | 1.61 s | 2.66 s | 4.19 s | 7.12 s | 37.0 in (0.94 m) | 10 ft 5 in (3.18 m) | 19 reps |
All values from NFL Combine/Pro Day

Kelly was selected by the New York Giants in the sixth round with the 193rd overall pick of the 2026 NFL draft. The selection was received from the Dallas Cowboys in exchange for Jordan Phillips and the 221st overall selection (the Cowboys traded to the Cincinnati Bengals).
