= VJ Payne =

American football player (born 2004)

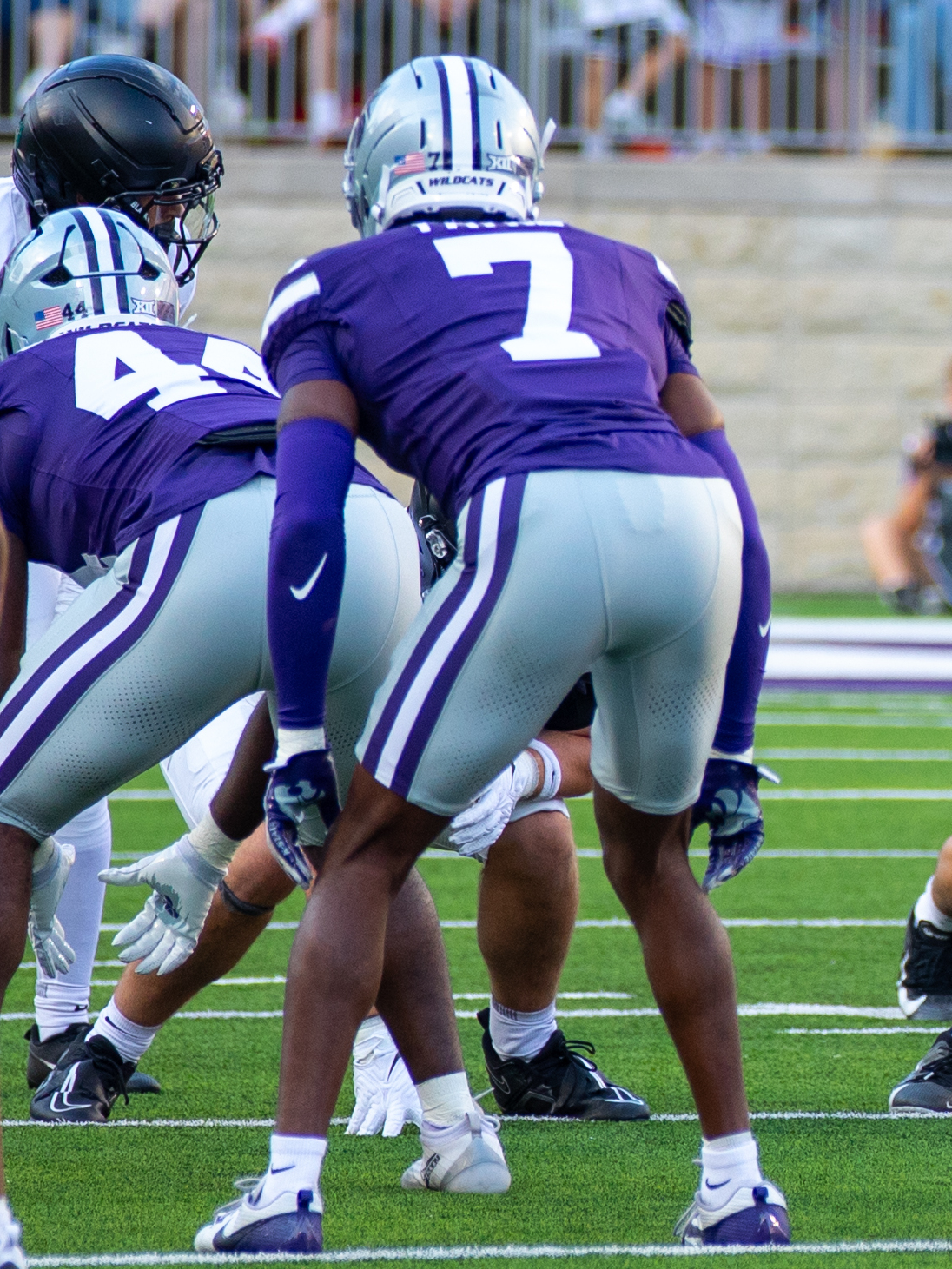
- Payne with Kansas State in 2025

No. 34 – New York Jets
- Position: Safety
- Roster status: Active

Personal information
- Born: March 17, 2004 (age 22); Gainesville, Georgia, U.S.
- Listed height: 6 ft 3 in (1.91 m)
- Listed weight: 206 lb (93 kg)

Career information
- High school: Buford (Buford, Georgia)
- College: Kansas State (2022–2025)
- NFL draft: 2026: 7th round, 228th overall pick

Career history
- New York Jets (2026–present)
- Stats at Pro Football Reference

Victor "VJ" Payne (born March 17, 2004) is an American professional football safety for the New York Jets of the National Football League (NFL). He played college football for the Kansas State Wildcats and was selected by the Jets in the seventh round of the 2026 NFL draft.

== Early life ==
Payne attended Buford High School in Buford, Georgia. He was rated as a three-star recruit and committed to play college football for the Kansas State Wildcats.

== College career ==
As a freshman in 2022, Payne played in all 14 games and made four starts, including in the Big 12 Championship Game and the Sugar Bowl. In 2023, he recorded 57 tackles and an interception. In 2024, Payne started all 13 games, where he totaled 64 tackles with three and a half being for a loss, four pass deflections, two interceptions, and two forced fumbles, earning honorable mention all-Big 12 honors. He earned an invitation to participate in the 2026 East-West Shrine Bowl.

== Professional career ==
Pre-draft measurables
| Height | Weight | Arm length | Hand span | Wingspan | 40-yard dash | 10-yard split | 20-yard split | 20-yard shuttle | Three-cone drill | Vertical jump | Broad jump |
|---|---|---|---|---|---|---|---|---|---|---|---|
| 6 ft 3 1/4 in (1.91 m) | 206 lb (93 kg) | 33 3/4 in (0.86 m) | 9 1/2 in (0.24 m) | 6 ft 8 3/4 in (2.05 m) | 4.40 s | 1.52 s | 2.56 s | 4.33 s | 6.94 s | 35.0 in (0.89 m) | 10 ft 7 in (3.23 m) |
All values from NFL Combine/Pro Day

Payne was selected by the New York Jets in the seventh round with the 228th overall pick of the 2026 NFL draft. He was placed on injured reserve due to a significant bone bruise on August 30, 2026. He was activated on November 14.
