= Kaleb Elarms-Orr =

American football player (born 2003)

No. 52 – Buffalo Bills
- Position: Linebacker
- Roster status: Active

Personal information
- Born: August 29, 2003 (age 23)
- Listed height: 6 ft 2 in (1.88 m)
- Listed weight: 234 lb (106 kg)

Career information
- High school: Moreau Catholic (Hayward, California)
- College: California (2021–2023); TCU (2024–2025)
- NFL draft: 2026: 4th round, 126th overall pick

Career history
- Buffalo Bills (2026–present)

Awards and highlights
- First-team All-Big 12 (2025)

Career NFL statistics as of Week 11, 2026
- Total tackles: 21
- Fumble recoveries: 2
- Pass deflections: 1
- Stats at Pro Football Reference

Kaleb Elarms-Orr (born August 29, 2003) is an American professional football linebacker for the Buffalo Bills of the National Football League (NFL). He played college football for the California Golden Bears and TCU Horned Frogs and was selected by the Bills in the fourth round of the 2026 NFL draft.

== Early life ==
Elarms-Orr attended Moreau Catholic High School in Hayward, California. He was rated as a four-star recruit, the 17th overall defensive end, and the 18th overall recruit in California in the class of 2021 by 247Sports. He also held offers from schools such as Arizona, Boise State, California, Colorado, Fresno State, Kansas, and San Diego State. Ultimately, Elarms-Orr committed to play college football for the California Golden Bears.

== College career ==
=== California ===
As a freshman in 2021, Elarms-Orr did not play in any games due to an ACL injury. In 2022, he appeared in ten games on special teams, where he did not record any tackles. During the 2023 season, Elarms-Orr recorded 92 tackles with three and a half being for a loss and an interception. After the conclusion of the 2023 season, he entered his name into the NCAA transfer portal.

=== TCU ===
Elarms-Orr transferred to play for the TCU Horned Frogs. In 2024, he recorded 54 tackles and two sacks. In week 8 of the 2025 season, Elarms-Orr was named the Big 12 Defensive Player of the week after totaling 16 tackles in a win over Baylor. In week 9, he recorded 16 tackles against West Virginia. In week 13, Elarms-Orr tallied 15 tackles in an upset victory versus Houston Cougars. For his performance during the 2025 season, he was named first-team all-Big 12. He also accepted an invite to participate in the 2026 Senior Bowl. Elarms-Orr capped his collegiate career with 11 tackles in TCU's upset victory over USC in the Alamo Bowl. He was named the game's defensive MVP.

== Professional career ==
Pre-draft measurables
| Height | Weight | Arm length | Hand span | Wingspan | 40-yard dash | 10-yard split | 20-yard split | 20-yard shuttle | Three-cone drill | Vertical jump | Broad jump | Bench press |
|---|---|---|---|---|---|---|---|---|---|---|---|---|
| 6 ft 2 in (1.88 m) | 234 lb (106 kg) | 31 1/2 in (0.80 m) | 9 in (0.23 m) | 6 ft 4 in (1.93 m) | 4.47 s | 1.59 s | 2.61 s | 4.32 s | 7.10 s | 40.0 in (1.02 m) | 10 ft 4 in (3.15 m) | 19 reps |
All values from NFL Combine/Pro Day

Elarms-Orr was selected by the Buffalo Bills in the fourth round with the 126th overall pick of the 2026 NFL draft.
