= Genesis Smith =

American football player (born 2004)

No. 22 – Los Angeles Chargers
- Position: Safety
- Roster status: Active

Personal information
- Born: November 5, 2004 (age 22)
- Listed height: 6 ft 2 in (1.88 m)
- Listed weight: 204 lb (93 kg)

Career information
- High school: Hamilton (Chandler, Arizona)
- College: Arizona (2023–2025)
- NFL draft: 2026: 4th round, 131st overall pick

Career history
- Los Angeles Chargers (2026–present)

Awards and highlights
- Third-team All-Big 12 (2025)

Career NFL statistics as of Week 9, 2026
- Total tackles: 16
- Pass deflections: 5
- Interceptions: 2
- Stats at Pro Football Reference

Genesis Smith (born November 5, 2004) is an American professional football safety for the Los Angeles Chargers of the National Football League (NFL). He played college football for the Arizona Wildcats and was selected by the Chargers in the fourth round of the 2026 NFL draft.

== Early life ==
Smith attended Hamilton High School in Chandler, Arizona. During his high school career he had 103 tackles and 16 interceptions. He committed to the University of Arizona to play college football.

== College career ==
Smith appeared in all 13 games as a true freshman at Arizona in 2023 and had 24 tackles and one interception. As a sophomore in 2024, he played in all 12 and recorded 63 tackles and three interceptions. After the season, he entered the transfer portal but returned to Arizona for the 2025 season. Smith racked up 77 total tackles and eight pass breakups to help Arizona finish as the seventh-best passing defense in the country.

== Professional career ==
Pre-draft measurables
Height	Weight	Arm length	Hand span	Wingspan	40-yard dash	10-yard split	20-yard split	20-yard shuttle	Three-cone drill	Vertical jump	Broad jump	Bench press
6 ft 2 1/8 in (1.88 m)	202 lb (92 kg)	32 1/2 in (0.83 m)	8 7/8 in (0.23 m)	6 ft 7 1/4 in (2.01 m)	4.52 s	1.53 s	2.58 s	4.18 s	7.03 s	42.5 in (1.08 m)	10 ft 10 in (3.30 m)	16 reps
All values from NFL Combine/Pro Day

Smith was selected in the fourth round of the 2026 NFL draft with the 131st pick by the Los Angeles Chargers.

In Week 3, Smith recorded his first two career interceptions against Josh Allen during the 24–16 loss against the Buffalo Bills.
