= Marcus Neal Jr. =

American football player

No. 31 – Penn State Nittany Lions
- Position: Safety
- Class: Junior

Personal information
- Listed height: 6 ft 1 in (1.85 m)
- Listed weight: 216 lb (98 kg)

Career information
- High school: Raytown South (Raytown, Missouri)
- College: Iowa State (2024–2025); Penn State (2026–present)

Awards and highlights
- Third-team All-Big 12 (2025)
- Stats at ESPN

Marcus Neal Jr. is an American college football safety for the Penn State Nittany Lions. He previously played for the Iowa State Cyclones.

== Early life ==
Neal Jr. attended Raytown South High School in Raytown, Missouri, where he played defensive back and wide receiver. As a senior, he was the Class 5 Missouri Defensive Player of the Year after recording 100 tackles and five interceptions. He also had 1,000 total yards from scrimmage with 11 receiving touchdowns and four rushing touchdowns. Neal Jr. committed to Iowa State University to play college football.

== College career ==
Neal Jr. played in 13 games his true freshman season at Iowa State in 2024, recording 18 tackles and one sack. He took over as a starter his sophomore year in 2025 and had 77 tackles, two interceptions and one sack. After Iowa State head coach Matt Campbell left to become Penn State's head coach, Neal entered the transfer portal and committed to Penn State for the 2026 season.
