= Treydan Stukes =

American football player (born 2001)

No. 31 – Las Vegas Raiders
- Position: Safety
- Roster status: Active

Personal information
- Born: September 11, 2001 (age 25); Litchfield Park, Arizona, U.S.
- Listed height: 6 ft 2 in (1.88 m)
- Listed weight: 200 lb (91 kg)

Career information
- High school: Millennium (Goodyear, Arizona)
- College: Arizona (2020–2025)
- NFL draft: 2026: 2nd round, 38th overall pick

Career history
- Las Vegas Raiders (2026–present)

Awards and highlights
- Second-team All-American (2025); First-team All-Big 12 (2025)

Career NFL statistics as of Week 4, 2026
- Tackles: 12
- Pass deflections: 1
- Interceptions: 1
- Stats at Pro Football Reference

Treydan Ray Stukes (born September 11, 2001) is an American professional football safety for the Las Vegas Raiders of the National Football League (NFL). He played college football for the Arizona Wildcats and was selected by the Raiders in the second round of the 2026 NFL draft.

== Early life ==
Stukes was born on September 11, 2001 in Litchfield Park, Arizona. He attended Millennium High School in Goodyear, Arizona. He was not highly recruited and joined the Arizona Wildcats as a walk-on.

== College career ==
=== Arizona ===
In five seasons with the Wildcats from 2020 through 2024, Stukes appeared in 43 games where he made 28 starts, totaling 154 tackles with 12 being for a loss, 25 pass deflections, and three interceptions for the Wildcats. He earned a scholarship with the team in 2021, while also being named a team captain for Arizona twice. However, after missing most of the 2024 season with an ACL injury, Stukes entered his name into the NCAA transfer portal. He would later withdraw his name from the transfer portal.

== Professional career ==
Pre-draft measurables
Height	Weight	Arm length	Hand span	Wingspan	40-yard dash	10-yard split	20-yard split	Vertical jump	Broad jump	Bench press
6 ft 0 5/8 in (1.84 m)	190 lb (86 kg)	31 3/4 in (0.81 m)	8 1/2 in (0.22 m)	6 ft 4 5/8 in (1.95 m)	4.33 s	1.50 s	2.56 s	38.0 in (0.97 m)	10 ft 10 in (3.30 m)	16 reps
All values from NFL Combine/Pro Day

Stukes was selected by the Las Vegas Raiders with the 38th overall pick in the second round of the 2026 NFL draft.
