= Bryce Foster =

American football player (born 2002)

No. 61 – Kansas Jayhawks
- Position: Center
- Class: (redshirt) Junior

Personal information
- Born: December 18, 2002 (age 23)
- Listed height: 6 ft 5 in (1.96 m)
- Listed weight: 310 lb (141 kg)

Career information
- High school: Taylor (Katy, Texas)
- College: Texas A&M (2021–2023); Kansas (2024–present)

Awards and highlights
- Second-team All-Big 12 (2024)
- Stats at ESPN

Bryce Foster (born December 18, 2002) is an American college football center for the Kansas Jayhawks. He previously played for the Texas A&M Aggies.

== Early life ==
Foster attended James E. Taylor High School in Katy, Texas. He was rated as a five-star recruit and committed to play college football for the Texas A&M Aggies over offers from schools such as LSU, Oklahoma, Oregon, and Texas.

== College career ==
=== Texas A&M ===
As a freshman in 2021, Foster started all 12 games for the Aggies and earned SEC all-freshman team honors. In 2022, he started just four games before suffering a season-ending knee injury. After starting all 12 games in 2023, Foster he entered his name into the NCAA transfer portal.

=== Kansas ===
Foster transferred to play for the Kansas Jayhawks where he has earned second-team all-Big 12 Conference honors.

== Professional career ==
Pre-draft measurables
| Height | Weight | Arm length | Hand span | Wingspan | 40-yard dash | 10-yard split | 20-yard split | 20-yard shuttle | Three-cone drill | Vertical jump | Broad jump | Bench press |
|---|---|---|---|---|---|---|---|---|---|---|---|---|
| 6 ft 4 5/8 in (1.95 m) | 310 lb (141 kg) | 31 3/8 in (0.80 m) | 10 in (0.25 m) | 6 ft 4 1/2 in (1.94 m) | 5.45 s | 1.95 s | 3.17 s | 4.78 s | 7.87 s | 26.5 in (0.67 m) | 8 ft 6 in (2.59 m) | 33 reps |
All values from Pro Day
