= Caleb Lomu =

American football player (born 2004)

No. 74 – New England Patriots
- Position: Offensive tackle
- Roster status: Active

Personal information
- Born: December 23, 2004 (age 21)
- Listed height: 6 ft 6 in (1.98 m)
- Listed weight: 313 lb (142 kg)

Career information
- High school: Highland (Gilbert, Arizona)
- College: Utah (2023–2025)
- NFL draft: 2026: 1st round, 28th overall pick

Career history
- New England Patriots (2026−present)

Awards and highlights
- First-team All-Big 12 (2025); Freshman All-American (2024)

Career NFL statistics as of Week 4, 2026
- Games played: 4
- Games started: 1
- Stats at Pro Football Reference

Caleb Lomu (born December 23, 2004) is an American professional football offensive tackle for the New England Patriots of the National Football League (NFL). He played college football for the Utah Utes and was selected by the Patriots in the first round of the 2026 NFL draft.

== Early life ==
Lomu attended Highland High School in Gilbert, Arizona, and is of Tongan descent. He earned invites to play in the All-American Bowl and the Polynesian Bowl. Lomu was rated as a four-star recruit and committed to play college football for the Utah Utes over offers from Arizona, Michigan, and USC.

== College career ==
As a freshman in 2023, Lomu only played 25 snaps for the Utes and took a redshirt. He earned the starting left tackle spot in 2024. That season, Lomu allowed just 17 pressures and two sacks, earning freshman all-American honors from The Athletic.

== Professional career ==
Pre-draft measurables
Height	Weight	Arm length	Hand span	Wingspan	40-yard dash	10-yard split	20-yard split	Vertical jump	Broad jump	Bench press
6 ft 6 1/4 in (1.99 m)	313 lb (142 kg)	33 3/8 in (0.85 m)	9 1/2 in (0.24 m)	6 ft 10 3/4 in (2.10 m)	4.99 s	1.74 s	2.92 s	32.5 in (0.83 m)	9 ft 5 in (2.87 m)	25 reps
All values from NFL Combine/Pro Day

Lomu was selected by the New England Patriots in the first round with the 28th overall pick in the 2026 NFL draft. The Patriots received the selection from the Buffalo Bills in exchange for the 31st overall pick (traded to the Tennessee Titans) and the 125th overall pick (Skyler Bell).
