= Jordan Seaton =

American football player (born 2005)

No. 77 – LSU Tigers
- Position: Offensive tackle
- Class: Junior

Personal information
- Born: June 19, 2005 (age 21)
- Listed height: 6 ft 5 in (1.96 m)
- Listed weight: 307 lb (139 kg)

Career information
- High school: IMG Academy (Bradenton, Florida)
- College: Colorado (2024–2025); LSU (2026–present)

Awards and highlights
- Second-team All-Big 12 (2025); Freshman All-American (2024)
- Stats at ESPN

Jordan Seaton (born June 19, 2005) is an American college football offensive tackle for the LSU Tigers. He previously played for the Colorado Buffaloes.

== Early life ==
Seaton is from Washington, D.C. He attended St. John's College High School in Washington, where he was a three-year varsity football player and was a guard and tackle. He played in the FBU Freshman All-American Bowl and was named first-team All-American by MaxPreps in all three of his seasons playing for St. John's. He transferred to IMG Academy in Bradenton, Florida, for his senior year of high school. Seaton was ranked a five-star recruit and a top-20 prospect nationally, as well as the best offensive tackle in the nation. He committed to play college football for the Colorado Buffaloes under coach Deion Sanders, in a move that USA Today said "shocked the college football world." In committing to Colorado, he declined some name, image, and likeness (NIL) offers of over $1 million.

== College career ==
Seaton won the starting left tackle role as a true freshman for Colorado in 2024, becoming the first true freshman starting tackle in Colorado history. Blocking for quarterback Shedeur Sanders, he impressed in his first year with the Buffaloes. In the regular season, he allowed only two sacks on 579 pass-blocking snaps, and The Athletic named him a first-team freshman All-American.

In January 2026, after two seasons at Colorado, Seaton announced his intention to enter the transfer portal and continue his college career elsewhere. Later that month, after a high-profile recruiting competition among several prominent football programs, Seaton committed to LSU over offers from Oregon and Miami.
