= Smith Snowden =

American football player (born 2005)

No. 3 – Michigan Wolverines
- Position: Cornerback
- Class: Senior

Personal information
- Born: February 1, 2005 (age 21)
- Listed height: 5 ft 10 in (1.78 m)
- Listed weight: 188 lb (85 kg)

Career information
- High school: Skyridge (Lehi, Utah)
- College: Utah (2023–2025); Michigan (2026–present)

Awards and highlights
- Second-team All-Big 12 (2025)
- Stats at ESPN

Smith Snowden (born February 1, 2005) is an American college football cornerback for the Michigan Wolverines. He previously played for the Utah Utes.

== Early life ==
Snowden attended Skyridge High School in Lehi, Utah. As a senior, he notched 28 tackles, six interceptions, and four total touchdowns. Coming out of high school, Snowden was rated as a four-star recruit and committed to play college football for the Utah Utes over offers from schools such as BYU, Northwestern, Penn, Stanford, and Yale.

== College career ==
=== Utah ===
Snowden enrolled at the University of Utah in 2023. As a freshman, Snowden got his first defensive reps in week eleven, playing 37 snaps and recording three tackles in a win over Arizona State. He appeared in eleven games that year and had seven total tackles. As a sophomore in 2024, Snowden recorded his first career interception on a pass thrown by Bryson Barnes in a win over Utah State. In the final game against UCF, he had his first career touchdown, returning an interception 13 yards. Snowden finished the 2024 season with 48 tackles, two interceptions and ten pass breakups. He also returned kicks the final four games. As a junior in 2025, Snowden was a second-team All-Big 12 Conference selection at cornerback, recording 37 tackles, two interceptions and eleven pass breakups. He also returned kicks and played part-time on offense, finishing with eight carries for 40 yards and a touchdown, along with 13 receptions for 57 yards. His first career rushing touchdown came against UCLA in the first game of the season. After his junior year, he entered the NCAA transfer portal.

=== Michigan ===
In January 2026, Snowden transferred to the University of Michigan, following head coach Kyle Whittingham from Utah.
