= Domonique Orange =

American football player (born 2004)

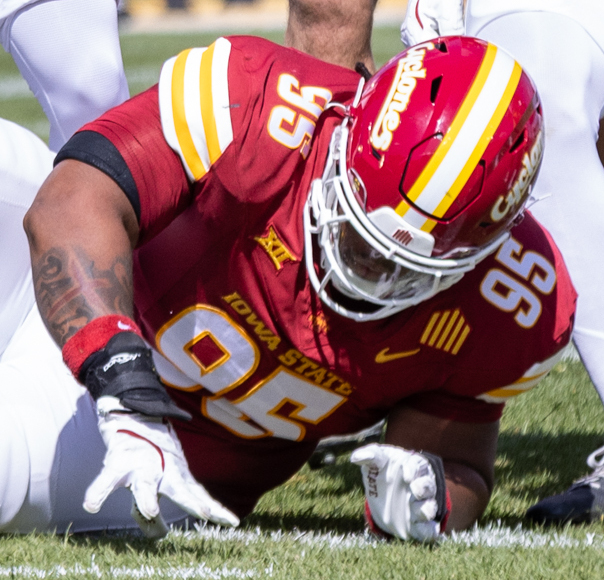
- Orange with the Iowa State Cyclones in 2025

No. 97 – Minnesota Vikings
- Position: Nose tackle
- Roster status: Active

Personal information
- Born: March 11, 2004 (age 22)
- Listed height: 6 ft 2 in (1.88 m)
- Listed weight: 322 lb (146 kg)

Career information
- High school: North Kansas City (North Kansas City, Missouri)
- College: Iowa State (2022–2025)
- NFL draft: 2026: 3rd round, 82nd overall pick

Career history
- Minnesota Vikings (2026–present)

Awards and highlights
- Third-team All-Big 12 (2025)

Career NFL statistics as of Week 10, 2026
- Tackles: 9
- Stats at Pro Football Reference

Domonique Orange (born March 11, 2004), nicknamed "Big Citrus", is an American professional football nose tackle for the Minnesota Vikings of the National Football League (NFL). He played college football for the Iowa State Cyclones and was selected by the Vikings in the third round of the 2026 NFL draft.

== Early life ==
Orange is from Kansas City, Missouri. He attended North Kansas City High School where he played football as a defensive tackle, being named all-district three times and all-state twice. In ninth grade, Orange weighed 300 pounds (140 kg), and by his senior year of high school, he weighed over 400 pounds (180 kg), resulting in him acquiring the nickname "Big Citrus". A consensus three-star recruit and a top prospect in Missouri, Orange committed to play college football for the Iowa State Cyclones.

== College career ==
Orange appeared in 12 games as a true freshman for the Cyclones in 2022, recording eight tackles. He weighed 350 pounds (160 kg) as a freshman before changing his eating habits and slimming down to 325 pounds (147 kg) by his junior year. He credited it for improving his stamina, saying that "Freshman year, I'd be able to play 15 to 20 snaps per game. Now I'm able to play however many they want me to." During the 2023 season, he started five games and was named honorable mention All-Big 12 Conference while recording 16 tackles. Entering the 2024 season, Orange was named to The Athletic's "Freaks List", highlighting the most athletic college football players. That year, Orange started seven games and repeated as an honorable mention All-Big 12 selection after recording 24 tackles, 4.5 tackles-for-loss (TFLs) and a sack. He returned for his senior season in 2025.

== Professional career ==
Pre-draft measurables
Height	Weight	Arm length	Hand span	Wingspan	40-yard dash	10-yard split	20-yard split	20-yard shuttle	Vertical jump	Broad jump	Bench press
6 ft 2 3/8 in (1.89 m)	322 lb (146 kg)	33 3/8 in (0.85 m)	10 1/4 in (0.26 m)	6 ft 8 7/8 in (2.05 m)	5.17 s	1.72 s	2.96 s	4.65 s	31.5 in (0.80 m)	8 ft 8 in (2.64 m)	27 reps
All values from NFL Combine/Pro Day

Orange was selected by the Minnesota Vikings in the third round with the 82nd overall pick of the 2026 NFL draft.
