= 2024 Cincinnati Bearcats football team =

American college football season

2024 Cincinnati Bearcats football
- Conference: Big 12 Conference
- Record: 5–7 (3–6 Big 12)
- Head coach: Scott Satterfield (2nd season)
- Offensive coordinator: Brad Glenn (2nd season)
- Offensive scheme: Spread option
- Defensive coordinator: Tyson Veidt (1st season)
- Co-defensive coordinator: Nate Fuqua (2nd season)
- Base defense: 4–2–5
- Home stadium: Nippert Stadium

Uniform
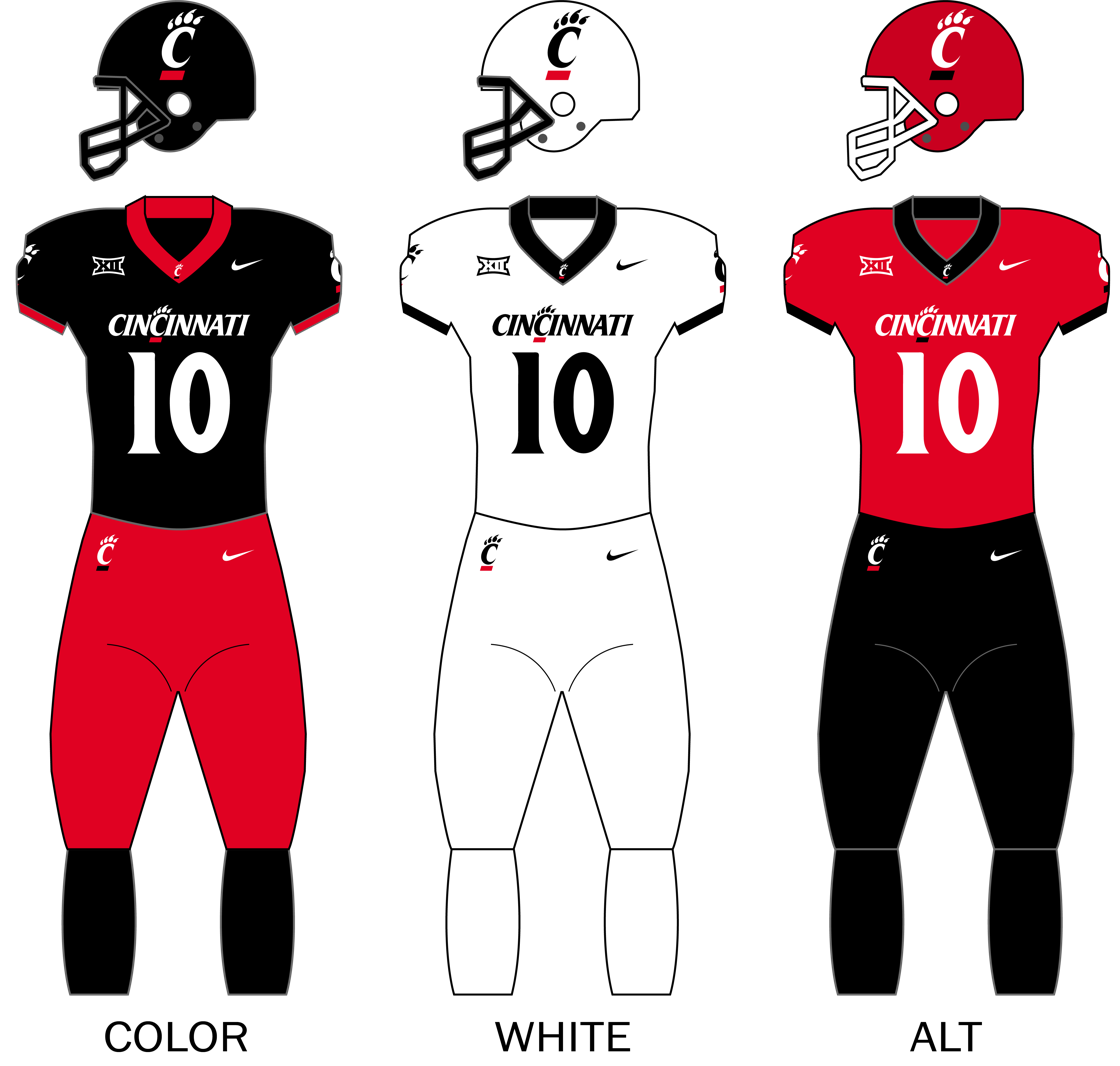

2024 Big 12 Conference football standings
	Conf.			Overall
Team	W		L	W		L
No. 7 Arizona State y$^	7	–	2	11	–	3
No. 15 Iowa State y	7	–	2	11	–	3
No. 13 BYU	7	–	2	11	–	2
No. 25 Colorado	7	–	2	9	–	4
Baylor	6	–	3	8	–	5
TCU	6	–	3	9	–	4
Texas Tech	6	–	3	8	–	5
Kansas State	5	–	4	9	–	4
West Virginia	5	–	4	6	–	7
Kansas	4	–	5	5	–	7
Cincinnati	3	–	6	5	–	7
Houston	3	–	6	4	–	8
Utah	2	–	7	5	–	7
UCF	2	–	7	4	–	8
Arizona	2	–	7	4	–	8
Oklahoma State	0	–	9	3	–	9
Championship: Arizona State 45, Iowa State 19
^ – College Football Playoff participant; $ – Conference champion; y – Championship game participant; Rankings from AP Poll

The 2024 Cincinnati Bearcats football team represented the University of Cincinnati during the 2024 NCAA Division I FBS football season. The Bearcats, members of the Big 12 Conference, played their home games at Nippert Stadium in Cincinnati, Ohio. 2024 was the program's second season under head coach Scott Satterfield. After a 5–2 start, the Bearcats lost their final five games to finish 5–7, failing to qualify for a bowl game.

== Offseason ==
=== Coaching staff changes ===
==== Departures ====
Name	Position	New school	New position
Bryan Brown	Defensive Coordinator/Assistant Head Coach	Ole Miss	Co-Defensive coordinator
De'Rail Sims	Running Backs	Tennessee	Running Backs

==== Additions ====
Name	Position	Previous school	Previous position
Tyson Veidt	Defensive coordinator / Safeties	Iowa State	Associate head coach/Linebackers
Sean Dawkins	Running backs	Memphis	Running backs

=== Transfer portal ===
Departing transfers
Name	Pos.	Height	Weight	Year	Hometown	New school
Donovan Ollie	WR	6' 3"	212	(redshirt) Junior	Wylie, TX	Colorado State
George Udo	CB	6' 1"	205	Senior	Walnut Creek, CA	Ball State
Deshawn Pace	LB	6' 2"	212	Senior	Cincinnati, OH	UCF
James Camden	LB	6' 1"	228	(redshirt) Junior	Cincinnati, OH	Murray State
Cam Jones	OT	6' 8"	330	(redshirt) Senior	Knott County, KY	Jacksonville State
Isiah Cox	S	6' 2"	185	(redshirt) Sophomore	Alcoa, TN	
Cayson Pfeiffer	LS	6' 0"	220	(redshirt) Junior	Columbus, OH	Wisconsin
Jah-mal Williams	OLB	6' 4"	238	(redshirt) Junior	Fort Lauderdale, FL	Troy
Chris Scott	WR	6' 2"	205	(redshirt) Junior	Columbus, OH	
Chamon Metayer	TE	6' 5"	220	(redshirt) Sophomore	Miami, FL	Colorado
Myles Montgomery	RB	5' 10"	195	(redshirt) Sophomore	Neptune Beach, FL	UCF
Stephan Byrd	RB	6' 0"	203	(redshirt) Freshman	Canal Winchester, OH	Youngstown State
Ty Perkins	WR	6' 3"	173	Freshman	Lucasville, OH	Marshall
Luke Dalton	OT	6' 5"	300	(redshirt) Freshman	Woodstock, IL	Ball State
Mao Glynn II	OT	6' 4"	280	(redshirt) Sophomore	Cincinnati, OH	UMass
Sammy Anderson Jr.	CB	6' 2"	170	(redshirt) Junior	Dayton, OH	Charlotte
Rory Bell	K	5' 9"	170	(redshirt) Junior	Wilmington, OH	UC Davis
Dion Hunter	LB	6' 2"	220	(redshirt) Junior	Rio Rancho, NM	Austin Peay
Bryon Threats	S	5' 10"	190	Junior	Dublin, OH	UCF
Justin Wodtly	DE	6' 3"	275	(redshirt) Senior	Cleveland, OH	Arizona State
CJ Doggette Jr.	DL	6' 0"	278	(redshirt) Freshman	Pickerington, OH	Ohio
Oliver Bridges	CB	6' 2"	190	(redshirt) Freshman	Potomac, MD	Buffalo
Justin Harris	CB	6' 0"	182	(redshirt) Senior	Dayton, OH	Texas State
Ethan Wright	RB	6' 1"	195	Senior	Akron, OH	Youngstown State
Daved Jones Jr.	LB	6' 1"	207	(redshirt) Junior	West Chester, OH	Jackson State
Jayden Davis	S	6' 2"	175	Freshman	Suwanee, GA	Georgia Tech
Rayquan Adkins	CB	5' 11"	185	Freshman	Miami, FL	James Madison
Trevor Carter	LB	6' 2"	205	Freshman	Ironton, OH	Pikeville
Derrick Shepard	DL	6' 3"	295	(redshirt) Freshman	Dayton, OH	UAB
Jabril White	CB	5' 10"	193	Junior	Oakland, CA	New Mexico State
Dorian Jones	LB	6' 0"	236	Senior	Plantation, FL	Virginia
Tyler Gillison	DL	6' 4"	240	(redshirt) Freshman	Pickerington, OH	Michigan State
Payten Singletary	TE	6' 4"	220	(redshirt) Junior	Thomasville, GA	USF

Incoming transfers
Name	Pos.	Height	Weight	Year	Hometown	Prev. school
Brendan Sorsby	QB	6' 3"	230	(redshirt) Freshman	Denton, TX	Indiana
Tyrin Smith	WR	5' 7"	170	Senior	Cibolo, TX	UTEP
Evan Pryor	RB	5' 11"	198	Junior	Cornelius, NC	Ohio State
Kye Stokes	S	6' 2"	185	Sophomore	Seffner, FL	Ohio State
Mikah Coleman	LB	6' 5"	220	Senior	Reynoldsburg, OH	Eastern Michigan
George Gumbs	EDGE	6' 4"	242	(redshirt) Sophomore	Chicago, IL	Northern Illinois
Ormanie Arnold	ATH	5' 10"	150	Sophomore	Long Beach, CA	Idaho
Tony Johnson	WR	5' 11"	180	Freshman	Ocala, FL	Florida Atlantic
Josh Minkins	S	6' 2"	202	(redshirt) Junior	Louisville, KY	Louisville
Kameron Wilson	LB	6' 1"	206	(redshirt) Sophomore	Jonesboro, GA	Louisville
Jayden Perry	LS	6' 4"	225	Freshman	Savannah, GA	Indiana State
Joe Royer	TE	6' 5"	225	Senior	Cincinnati, OH	Ohio State
Derrick Canteen	CB	5' 10"	175	(redshirt) Senior	Evans, GA	Virginia Tech
Mehki Miller	S	6' 1"	170	(redshirt) Junior	Olympia, IL	New Mexico State
Jared Bartlett	LB	6' 2"	213	(redshirt) Junior	Suwanee, GA	West Virginia
Chance Williams	RB	5' 8"	185	Sophomore	Baton Rouge, LA	Grambling State
Darian Varner	EDGE	6' 3"	275	Junior	Norfolk, VA	Wisconsin
Max Fletcher	P	6' 5"	190	Sophomore	Melbourne, Australia	Arkansas
Xavier Lozowicki	OT	6' 6"	300	Freshman	Ridley Park, PA	Maine
Cameron Roetherford	DL	6' 4"	290	Sophomore	Warren, MI	Arkansas–Pine Bluff
Jordan Robinson	CB	6' 4"	208	Junior	Columbia, SC	Kentucky
Jamoi Mayes	WR	5' 11"	202	Junior	Griffin, GA	UAB

=== Recruiting ===
College recruiting (2023)
Name	Hometown	School	Height	Weight	Commit date
Daniel James; CB	Powder Springs, Georgia	McEachern High School	5 ft 11 in (1.80 m)	175 lb (79 kg)	Apr 10, 2023
Daniel James; CB	Recruit ratings: Rivals: 247Sports: ESPN:				
Gavin Grover; TE	Lewis Center, Ohio	Olentangy High School	6 ft 6 in (1.98 m)	220 lb (100 kg)	Apr 16, 2023
Gavin Grover; TE	Recruit ratings: Rivals: 247Sports: ESPN:				
Samaj Jones; QB	Philadelphia, Pennsylvania	St. Joseph's Prep School	5 ft 11 in (1.80 m)	218 lb (99 kg)	Jul 2, 2023
Samaj Jones; QB	Recruit ratings: Rivals: 247Sports: ESPN:				
Kale Woodburn; WR	Warner Robins, Georgia	Houston County High School	5 ft 9 in (1.75 m)	155 lb (70 kg)	Apr 19, 2023
Kale Woodburn; WR	Recruit ratings: Rivals: 247Sports: ESPN:				
Overall recruit ranking:
Note: In many cases, Scout, Rivals, 247Sports, On3, and ESPN may conflict in their listings of height and weight.; In these cases, the average was taken. ESPN grades are on a 100-point scale.; Sources: "2023 Cincinnati Football Commitment List". Rivals.; "2023 Players Commitments – Cincinnati". ESPN.; "2023 Team Ranking". Rivals.com.; "2024 Cincinnati Bearcats football team". 247Sports.

=== 2024 NFL draft ===
Round	Pick	Player	Position	Team
7	243	Jowon Briggs	DT	Cleveland Browns

=== 2024 CFL draft ===
Round	Pick	Player	Position	Team
1	1	Joel Dublanko	LB	Edmonton Elks

== Preseason ==
=== Big 12 preseason poll ===
The Big 12 preseason media poll was released on July 2, 2024. Cincinnati was predicted to finished 14th in the conference.

=== Preseason Big-12 awards ===
2024 Preseason All Big-12 teams

Offensive

Position	Player	Class
Offense
OL	Luke Kandra	Sr.

Defense

Position	Player	Class
Defense
DT	Dontay Corleone	RS Jr.

=== Preseason All-Americans ===
Pre-season All-American Honors
Player	Position	Designation	AP	Athlon	CBS Sports	CFN	ESPN	PFF	SI	SN	USAT	WCFF
Dontay Corleone	DT	1st Team Defense	–	–	–	✓	–	–	–	–	–	–
Luke Kandra	OL	2nd Team Offense	–	–	–	✓	–	–	–	–	–	✓

Other Pre-season All-American Honors
Player	Position	Selector(s)
Dontay Corleone	DT	4th Team Defense (Athlon)

=== Award watch lists ===
Listed in the order that they were released

Award	Player	Position	Year	Source
Lott Trophy	Dontay Corleone	DT	Jr.	
Maxwell Award	Corey Kiner	RB	Sr.	
Outland Trophy	Dontay Corleone	DL	Jr.	
Outland Trophy	Luke Kandra	OG	R-Sr.	
Bronko Nagurski Trophy	Dontay Corleone	DL	Jr.	
Ray Guy Award	Mason Fletcher	P	Sr.	
Rimington Trophy	Gavin Gerhardt	C	R-Sr.	
Bednarik Award	Dontay Corleone	DL	Jr.	
Johnny Unitas Golden Arm Award	Brendan Sorsby	QB	R-So.	
Rotary Lombardi Award	Dontay Corleone	Jr.	DL	
Rotary Lombardi Award	Luke Kandra	OG	R-Sr.	

== Schedule ==
Date	Time	Opponent	Site	TV	Result	Attendance
August 31	2:30 p.m.	Towson*	Nippert Stadium; Cincinnati, OH	ESPN+	W 38–20	37,654
September 7	12:00 p.m.	Pittsburgh*	Nippert Stadium; Cincinnati, OH	ESPN2	L 27–28	37,992
September 14	12:00 p.m.	at Miami (OH)*	Yager Stadium; Oxford, OH (Victory Bell)	ESPNU	W 27–16	24,717
September 21	12:00 p.m.	Houston	Nippert Stadium; Cincinnati, OH	FS1	W 34–0	38,007
September 28	8:00 p.m.	at Texas Tech	Jones AT&T Stadium; Lubbock, TX	ESPN2	L 41–44	60,229
October 12	3:30 p.m.	at UCF	FBC Mortgage Stadium; Orlando, FL (rivalry)	ESPN2	W 19–13	42,611
October 19	12:00 p.m.	Arizona State^{†}	Nippert Stadium; Cincinnati, OH	ESPN+	W 24–14	38,007
October 26	10:15 p.m.	at Colorado	Folsom Field; Boulder, CO	ESPN	L 23–34	53,202
November 9	12:00 p.m.	West Virginia	Nippert Stadium; Cincinnati, OH (rivalry)	FS1	L 24–31	38,007
November 16	8:00 p.m.	at Iowa State	Jack Trice Stadium; Ames, IA	FOX	L 17–34	52,881
November 23	8:00 p.m.	at Kansas State	Bill Snyder Family Football Stadium; Manhattan, KS	ESPN2	L 15–41	50,988
November 30	6:00 p.m.	TCU	Nippert Stadium; Cincinnati, OH	ESPN+	L 13–20	30,021
*Non-conference game; ^{†}Homecoming; All times are in Eastern time; Source:

== Game summaries ==
=== vs Towson (FCS) ===
Towson Tigers (FCS) (0–0) vs Cincinnati Bearcats (0–0) – Game summary

Quarter	1	2	3	4	Total
Tigers (FCS)	3	14	3	0	20
Bearcats	21	7	10	0	38

at Nippert Stadium • Cincinnati, OH

- Date: August 31, 2024
- Game time: 2:30 p.m.
- Game weather: Temperature: 86 °F (30 °C), Weather: Sunny, Wind: NW 3 miles per hour (4.8 km/h)
- Game attendance: 37,654
- Referee: Tutashinda Salaam
- TV announcers (ESPN+): Eric Rothman (play-by-play) and Je'Rod Cherry (analyst)
- Recap

Game information

First quarter

- (11:17) CIN – Brendan Sorsby 2-yard run, Carter Brown kick (Drive: 7 plays, 75 yards, 3:43; Cincinnati 7–0)
- (8:03) TOW – Keegan Vaughan 32-yard field goal (Drive: 4 plays, 5 yards, 1:44; Cincinnati 7–3)
- (6:50) CIN – Xzavier Henderson 42-yard pass from Brendan Sorsby, Carter Brown kick (Drive: 4 plays, 65 yards, 1:08; Cincinnati 14–3)
- (3:13) CIN – Sterling Berkhalter 61-yard pass from Brendan Sorsby, Carter Brown kick (Drive: 3 plays, 75 yards, 1:03; Cincinnati 21–3)

Second quarter

- (9:54) TOW – Jaceon Doss 76-yard pass from Carlos Davis, Keegan Vaughan kick (Drive: 4 plays, 96 yards, 0:59; Cincinnati 21–10)
- (6:56) CIN – Brendan Sorsby 12-yard run, Carter Brown kick (Drive: 5 plays, 63 yards, 2:53; Cincinnati 28–10)
- (0:19) TOW – John Dunmore 28-yard pass from Carlos Davis, Keegan Vaughan kick (Drive: 8 plays, 80 yards, 1:27; Cincinnati 28–17)

Third quarter

- (10:10) TOW – Keegan Vaughan 33-yard field goal (Drive: 12 plays, 59 yards, 4:50; Cincinnati 28–20)
- (9:52) CIN – Evan Pryor 64-yard run, Carter Brown kick (Drive: 1 play, 64 yards, 0:10; Cincinnati 35–20)
- (4:38) CIN – Carter Brown 36-yard field goal (Drive: 11 plays, 63 yards, 3:41; Cincinnati 38–20)

Fourth quarter

No scoring plays

Statistics	TOW	CIN
First downs	21	26
Total yards	438	658
Rushing yards	37–194	32–275
Passing yards	244	383
Passing: Comp–Att–Int	21–37–0	22–31–0
Time of possession	32:03	27:57

Team	Category	Player	Statistics
Towson	Passing	Carlos Davis	21/37, 244 yards, 2 TD
Towson	Rushing	Devin Matthews	17 carries, 74 yards
Towson	Receiving	Jaceon Doss	3 receptions, 87 yards, TD
Cincinnati	Passing	Brendan Sorsby	22/31, 383 yards, 2 TD
Cincinnati	Rushing	Evan Pryor	4 carries, 105 yards, TD
Cincinnati	Receiving	Xzavier Henderson	7 receptions, 101 yards, TD

=== vs Pittsburgh ===
Pittsburgh Panthers (1–0) vs Cincinnati Bearcats (1–0) – Game summary

Quarter	1	2	3	4	Total
Panthers	3	3	7	15	28
Bearcats	14	3	10	0	27

at Nippert Stadium • Cincinnati

- Date: September 7, 2024
- Game time: 12:00 p.m.
- Game weather: Temperature: 62 °F (17 °C), Weather: Sunny, Wind: N 12 miles per hour (19 km/h)
- Game attendance: 37,992
- Referee: Adam Savoie
- TV announcers (ESPN2): Roy Philpott (play-by-play), Sam Acho (analyst), and Taylor Davis (sideline reporter)
- Recap

Game information

First quarter

- (7:47) CIN – Jamoi Mayes 52-yard pass from Brendan Sorsby, Carter Brown kick (Drive: 4 plays, 80 yards, 1:20; Cincinnati 7–0)
- (3:52) PIT – Ben Sauls 47-yard field goal (Drive: 10 plays, 48 yards, 3:50; Cincinnati 7–3)
- (1:11) CIN – Tony Johnson 5-yard pass from Brendan Sorsby, Carter Brown kick (Drive: 6 plays, 75 yards, 2:41; Cincinnati 14–3)

Second quarter

- (8:11) CIN – Carter Brown 49-yard field goal (Drive: 14 plays, 31 yards, 7:14; Cincinnati 17–3)
- (0:00) PIT – Ben Sauls 53-yard field goal (Drive: 4 plays, 45 yards, 0:23; Cincinnati 17–6)

Third quarter

- (7:25) CIN – Joe Royer 16-yard pass from Brendan Sorsby, Carter Brown kick (Drive: 10 plays, 58 yards, 5:13; Cincinnati 24–6)
- (4:50) CIN – Carter Brown 26-yard field goal (Drive: 6 plays, 31 yards, 1:59; Cincinnati 27–6)
- (0:46) PIT – Konata Mumpfield 11-yard pass from Eli Holstein, Ben Sauls kick (Drive: 10 plays, 75 yards, 4:04; Cincinnati 27–13)

Fourth quarter

- (10:41) PIT – Konata Mumpfield 38-yard pass from Eli Holstein (Drive: 7 plays, 82 yards, 3:23; Cincinnati 27–19)
- (5:40) PIT – Desmond Reid 56-yard pass from Eli Holstein (Drive: 7 plays, 94 yards, 2:04; Cincinnati 27–25)
- (0:17) PIT – Ben Sauls 35-yard field goal (Drive: 9 plays, 63 yards, 2:21; Pittsburgh 28–27)

Statistics	PITT	CIN
First downs	24	21
Total yards	498	449
Rushing yards	196	151
Passing yards	302	298
Passing: Comp–Att–Int	20–35–1	22–38–0
Time of possession	23:35	36:25

Team	Category	Player	Statistics
Pittsburgh	Passing	Eli Holstein	20/35, 302 yards, 3 TD, INT
Pittsburgh	Rushing	Desmond Reid	19 carries, 148 yards
Pittsburgh	Receiving	Konata Mumpfield	5 receptions, 123 yards, 2 TD
Cincinnati	Passing	Brendan Sorsby	22/38, 298 yards, 3 TD
Cincinnati	Rushing	Corey Kiner	20 carries, 149 yards
Cincinnati	Receiving	Xzavier Henderson	5 receptions, 80 yards

=== at Miami (Ohio) (Victory Bell) ===
Cincinnati Bearcats (1–1) at Miami RedHawks (0–1) – Game summary

Quarter	1	2	3	4	Total
Bearcats	3	7	7	10	27
RedHawks	0	3	7	6	16

at Yager Stadium • Oxford, OH

- Date: September 14, 2024
- Game time: 12:00 p.m.
- Game weather: Temperature: 83 °F (28 °C), Weather: Sunny, Wind: W 8 miles per hour (13 km/h)
- Game attendance: 24,717
- Referee: Luke Richmond
- TV announcers (ESPNU): Matt Schumacker (play-by-play) and Dustin Fox (analyst)
- Recap

Game information

First quarter

- (3:27) CIN – Nathan Hawks 55-yard field goal (Drive: 8 plays, 26 yards, 2:58; Cincinnati 3–0)

Second quarter

- (14:13) MIA – Dom Dzioban 30-yard field goal (Drive: 8 plays, 63 yards, 4:13; Tied 3–3)
- (10:37) CIN – Joe Royer 3-yard pass from Brendan Sorsby, Nathan Hawks kick (Drive: 1 play, 3 yards, 0:00; Cincinnati 10–3)

Third quarter

- (7:38) CIN – Corey Kiner 1-yard run, Nathan Hawks kick (Drive: 12 plays, 75 yards, 7:22; Cincinnati 17–3)
- (5:32) MIA – Reggie Virgil 58-yard pass from Brett Gabbert, Dom Dzioban kick (Drive: 4 plays, 75 yards, 2:06; Cincinnati 17–10)

Fourth quarter

- (13:01) CIN – Evan Pryor 65-yard run, Nathan Hawks kick (Drive: 1 play, 65 yards, 0:13; Cincinnati 24–10)
- (07:57) MIA – Cade McDonald 7-yard pass from Brett Gabbert (Drive: 11 plays, 75 yards, 5:04; Cincinnati 24–16)
- (0:59) CIN – Nathan Hawks 50-yard field goal (Drive: 7 plays, 56 yards, 2:44; Cincinnati 27–16)

Statistics	CIN	M-OH
First downs	20	15
Total yards	401	380
Rushing yards	215	24
Passing yards	186	356
Passing: Comp–Att–Int	21–34–0	25–39–1
Time of possession	31:29	28:31

Team	Category	Player	Statistics
Cincinnati	Passing	Brendan Sorsby	21/34, 186 yards, 1 TD
Cincinnati	Rushing	Corey Kiner	21 carries, 126 yards, 1 TD
Cincinnati	Receiving	Xzavier Henderson	10 receptions, 108 yards
Miami (Ohio)	Passing	Brett Gabbert	23/25. 339 yds, 2 TD, 1 INT
Miami (Ohio)	Rushing	Kevin Davis	3 carries, 14 yards
Miami (Ohio)	Receiving	Cade McDonald	8 receptions, 135 yards, 1 TD

=== vs Houston ===
Houston Cougars (1–2) vs Cincinnati Bearcats (2–1) – Game summary

Quarter	1	2	3	4	Total
Cougars	0	0	0	0	0
Bearcats	14	10	7	3	34

at Nippert Stadium • Cincinnati

- Date: September 21, 2024
- Game time: 12:00 p.m.
- Game weather: Temperature: 81 °F (27 °C), Weather: Sunny, Wind: W 2 miles per hour (3.2 km/h)
- Game attendance: 38,007
- Referee: David Alvarez
- TV announcers (FS1): Dan Hellie (play-by-play) and Petros Papadakis (analyst)
- Recap

Game information

First quarter

- (10:46) CIN – Xzavier Henderson 19-yard pass from Brendan Sorsby, Nathan Hawks kick (Drive: 3 plays, 45 yards, 1:19; Cincinnati 7–0)
- (2:57) CIN – Corey Kiner 44-yard run, Nathan Hawks kick (Drive: 4 plays, 80 yards, 2:17; Cincinnati 14–0)

Second quarter

- (6:27) CIN – Xzavier Henderson 15-yard pass from Brendan Sorsby, Nathan Hawks kick (Drive: 12 plays, 80 yards, 7:11; Cincinnati 21–0)
- (1:51) CIN – Nathan Hawks 46-yard field goal (Drive: 6 plays, 25 yards, 2:32; Cincinnati 24–0)

Third quarter

- (9:09) CIN – Brendan Sorsby 8-yard run, Nathan Hawks kick (Drive: 8 plays, 89 yards, 4:00; Cincinnati 31–0)

Fourth quarter

- (3:47) CIN – Nathan Hawks 34-yard field goal (Drive: 15 plays, 52 yards, 9:51; Cincinnati 34–0)

Statistics	HOU	CIN
First downs	12	22
Total yards	233	362
Rushing yards	141	149
Passing yards	92	213
Passing: Comp–Att–Int	13–21–1	15–19–0
Time of possession	26:26	33:34

Team	Category	Player	Statistics
Houston	Passing	Donovan Smith	11/16, 73 yards, INT
Houston	Rushing	Re'Shaun Sanford II	6 carries, 62 yards
Houston	Receiving	Joseph Manjack IV	2 receptions, 51 yards
Cincinnati	Passing	Brendan Sorsby	12/15, 188 yards, 2 TD
Cincinnati	Rushing	Corey Kiner	16 carries, 78 yards, TD
Cincinnati	Receiving	Sterling Berkhalter	3 receptions, 60 yards

=== at Texas Tech ===
Cincinnati Bearcats (3–1) at Texas Tech Red Raiders (3–1) – Game summary

Quarter	1	2	3	4	Total
Bearcats	14	10	3	14	41
Red Raiders	10	14	10	10	44

at Jones AT&T Stadium, Lubbock, Texas

- Date: September 28, 2024
- Game time: 8:00 p.m.
- Game weather: Temperature: 84 °F (29 °C), Weather: Sunny, Wind: NE 10 miles per hour (16 km/h)
- Game attendance: 60,229
- Referee: Cravonne Barrett
- TV announcers (ESPN2): Brian Custer (play-by-play), Rod Gilmore (analyst), and Lauren Sisler (sideline reporter)
- Recap

Game information
First quarter
- TTU – Gino Garcia 45-yard field goal, 11:33. Red Raiders 3–0. Drive: 8 plays, 38 yards, 3:22.
- CIN – Tony Johnson 15-yard pass from Brendan Sorsby (Nathan Hawks kick), 7:35. Bearcats 7–3. Drive: 7 plays, 68 yards, 3:52.
- CIN – Xzavier Henderson 42-yard pass from Brendan Sorsby (Nathan Hawks kick), 4:59. Bearcats 14–3. Drive: 1 play, 42 yards, 0:08.
- TTU – Coy Eakin 7-yard pass from Behren Morton (Gino Garcia kick), 1:25. Bearcats 14–10. Drive: 7 plays, 75 yards, 3:34.

Second quarter

- CIN – Nathan Hawks 37-yard field goal, 13:27. Bearcats 17–10. Drive: 5 plays, 12 yards, 2:04.
- TTU – Coy Eakin 49-yard pass from Behren Morton (Reese Burkhardt kick), 10:32. Tied 17–17. Drive: 6 plays, 85 yards, 2:50.
- CIN – Evan Pryor 1-yard run (Nathan Hawks kick), 3:47. Bearcats 24–17. Drive: 12 plays, 75 yards, 6:45.
- TTU – Tahj Brooks 1-yard run (Gino Garcia kick), 1:39. Tied 24–24. Drive: 8 plays, 75 yards, 1:59.

Third quarter

- TTU – Tahj Brooks 2-yard run (Gino Garcia kick), 12:27. Red Raiders 31–24. Drive: 6 plays, 38 yards, 1:52.
- CIN – Nathan Hawks 26-yard field goal, 6:39. Red Raiders 31–27. Drive: 11 plays, 72 yards, 5:42.
- TTU – Reese Burkhardt 38-yard field goal, 0:53. Red Raiders 34–27. Drive: 13 plays, 55 yards, 5:46.

Fourth quarter

- TTU – A. J. McCarty 51-yard interception return (Gino Garcia kick), 12:40. Red Raiders 41–27.
- CIN – Manny Covey 71-yard pass from Brendan Sorsby (Nathan Hawks kick), 12:05. Red Raiders 41–34. Drive: 2 plays, 75 yards, 0:35.
- TTU – Gino Garcia 27-yard field goal, 7:50. Red Raiders 44–34. Drive: 9 plays, 66 yards, 4:15.
- CIN – Manny Covey 3-yard pass from Brendan Sorsby (Nathan Hawks kick), 3:24. Red Raiders 44–41. Drive: 10 plays, 75 yards, 4:26.

Statistics	CIN	TTU
First downs	29	21
Total yards	555	482
Rushing yards	129	231
Passing yards	426	251
Turnovers	2	1
Time of possession	32:01	27:59

Team	Category	Player	Statistics
Cincinnati	Passing	Brendan Sorsby	31/45, 426 yards, 4 TD, INT
Cincinnati	Rushing	Brendan Sorsby	12 rushes, 52 yards
Cincinnati	Receiving	Xzavier Henderson	7 receptions, 127 yards, TD
Texas Tech	Passing	Behren Morton	19/29, 251 yards, 2 TD
Texas Tech	Rushing	Tahj Brooks	32 rushes, 172 yards, 2 TD
Texas Tech	Receiving	Josh Kelly	8 receptions, 111 yards

=== at UCF (rivalry) ===
Cincinnati Bearcats (3–2) at UCF Knights (3–2) – Game summary

Quarter	1	2	3	4	Total
Bearcats	3	7	3	6	19
Knights	0	3	7	0	10

at FBC Mortgage Stadium • Orlando, FL

- Date: October 12, 2024
- Game time: 3:30 p.m.
- Game weather: Temperature: 81 °F (27 °C), Weather: Sunny, Wind: NE 7 miles per hour (11 km/h)
- Game attendance: 42,611
- Referee: Stephen Baron
- TV announcers (ESPN2): Mike Monaco (play-by-play), Kirk Morrison (analyst), and Dawn Davenport (sideline reporter)
- Recap

Game information

First quarter

- (8:36) CIN – Nathan Hawks 22-yard field goal (Drive: 4 plays, 1 yard, 0:48; Cincinnati 3–0)

Second quarter

- (14:56) CIN – Brendan Sorsby 3-yard run, Nathan Hawks kick (Drive: 11 plays, 61 yards, 5:58; Cincinnati 10–0)
- (1:52) UCF – Grant Reddick 22-yard field goal (Drive: 13 plays, 93 yards, 6:10; Cincinnati 10–3)

Third quarter

- (8:26) UCF – Kobe Hudson 15-yard pass from Jacurri Brown, Grant Reddick kick (Drive: 10 plays, 84 yards, 4:06; Tied 10–10)
- (3:06) CIN – Nathan Hawks 51-yard field goal (Drive: 9 plays, 42 yards, 5:20; Cincinnati 13–10)

Fourth quarter

- (6:32) CIN – Tony Johnson 4-yard pass from Brendan Sorsby (Drive: 9 plays, 52 yards, 4:04; Cincinnati 19–10)
- (2:59) UCF – Grant Reddick 29-yard field goal (Drive: 9 plays, 65 yards, 3:08; Cincinnati 19–13)

Statistics	CIN	UCF
First downs	19	19
Total yards	338	397
Rushing yards	97	196
Passing yards	241	201
Passing: Comp–Att–Int	25–38–2	14–25–0
Time of possession	33:44	26:16

Team	Category	Player	Statistics
Cincinnati	Passing	Brendan Sorsby	25/38, 241 yards, 1 TD, 1 INT
Cincinnati	Rushing	Corey Kiner	17 carries, 98 yards
Cincinnati	Receiving	Joe Royer	8 receptions, 84 yards
UCF	Passing	Jacurri Brown	13/20, 207 yards, 1 TD
UCF	Rushing	RJ Harvey	17 carries, 96 yards
UCF	Receiving	Kobe Hudson	7 receptions, 114 yards, 1 TD

=== vs Arizona State ===
Arizona State Sun Devils (5–1) vs Cincinnati Bearcats (4–2) – Game summary

Quarter	1	2	3	4	Total
Sun Devils	7	0	7	0	14
Bearcats	10	14	0	0	24

at Nippert Stadium • Cincinnati

- Date: October 19, 2024
- Game time: 12:00 p.m.
- Game weather: Temperature: 63 °F (17 °C), Weather: Sunny, Wind: E 10 miles per hour (16 km/h)
- Game attendance: 38,007
- Referee: Kevin Mar
- TV announcers (ESPN+): Shawn Kenney (play-by-play), Max Starks (analyst), and Shane Sparks (sideline reporter)
- Recap

Game information

First quarter

- (10:35) ASU – Cameron Skattebo 2-yard run, Ian Hershey kick (Drive: 6 plays, 66 yards, 3:06; Arizona State 7–0)
- (7:26) CIN – Brendan Sorsby 14-yard run, Nathan Hawks kick (Drive: 2 plays, 22 yards, 0:46; Tied 7–7)
- (2:18) CIN – Nathan Hawks 46-yard field goal (Drive: 6 plays, 13 yards, 3:11; Cincinnati 10–7)

Second quarter

- (11:38) CIN – Evan Pryor 55-yard run, Nathan Hawks kick (Drive: 6 plays, 91 yards, 3:19; Cincinnati 17–7)
- (1:55) CIN – Brendan Sorsby 1-yard run, Nathan Hawks kick (Drive: 5 plays, 50 yards, 2:47; Cincinnati 24–7)

Third quarter

- (10:35) ASU – Cameron Skattebo 1-yard run, Ian Hershey kick (Drive: 8 plays, 74 yards, 4:23; Arizona State 24–14)

Fourth quarter

No scoring plays

Statistics	ASU	CIN
First downs	18	23
Total yards	346	397
Rushing yards	191	191
Passing yards	155	206
Passing: Comp–Att–Int	12–23–0	23–31–1
Time of possession	25:20	34:40

Team	Category	Player	Statistics
Arizona State	Passing	Jeff Sims	12/23, 155 yards
Arizona State	Rushing	Cameron Skattebo	17 carries, 76 yards, 2 TD
Arizona State	Receiving	Jordyn Tyson	8 receptions, 108 yards
Cincinnati	Passing	Brendan Sorsby	23/31, 206 yards, INT
Cincinnati	Rushing	Corey Kiner	22 carries, 108 yards
Cincinnati	Receiving	Xzavier Henderson	8 receptions, 67 yards

=== at Colorado ===
Cincinnati Bearcats (5–2) at Colorado Buffaloes (5–2) – Game summary

Quarter	1	2	3	4	Total
Bearcats	7	7	0	9	23
Buffaloes	14	10	7	3	34

at Folsom Field • Boulder, CO

- Date: October 26, 2024
- Game time: 10:15 p.m.
- Game weather: Temperature: 55 °F (13 °C), Weather: Clear, Wind: SW 6 miles per hour (9.7 km/h)
- Game attendance: 53,202
- Referee: Henry Johns
- TV announcers (ESPN): Mark Jones (play-by-play), Roddy Jones (analyst), and Quint Kessenich (sideline)
- Recap

Game information

First quarter

- (9:32) COL – Travis Hunter 3-yard pass from Shedeur Sanders, Alejandro Mata kick (Drive: 11 plays, 64 yards, 4:54; Colorado 7–0)
- (6:01) CIN – Tony Johnson 6-yard pass from Brendan Sorsby, Nathan Hawks kick (Drive: 7 plays, 74 yards, 3:24; Tied 7–7)
- (0:00) COL – Shedeur Sanders 4-yard run, Alejandro Mata kick (Drive: 12 plays, 90 yards, 5:54; Colorado 14–7)

Second quarter

- (9:31) CIN – Evan Pryor 13-yard run, Nathan Hawks kick (Drive: 10 plays, 72 yards, 5:22; Tied 14–14)
- (3:28) COL – Alejandro Mata 28-yard field goal (Drive: 13 plays, 64 yards, 6:03; Colorado 17–14)
- (0:03) COL – Travis Hunter 34-yard pass from Shedeur Sanders, Alejandro Mata kick (Drive: 5 plays, 54 yards, 0:30; Colorado 24–14)

Third quarter

- (5:41) COL – Isaiah Augustave 7-yard run, Alejandro Mata kick (Drive: 6 plays, 62 yards, 3:10; Colorado 31–14)

Fourth quarter

- (9:20) CIN – Nathan Hawks 32-yard field goal (Drive: 13 plays, 75 yards, 6:04; Colorado 31–17)
- (3:51) CIN – Joe Royer 6-yard pass from Brendan Sorsby, two-point conversion failed (Drive: 11 plays, 81 yards, 3:39; Colorado 31–23)
- (1:39) COL – Alejandro Mata 47-yard field goal (Drive: 7 plays, 60 yards, 2:11; Colorado 34–23)

Statistics	CIN	COL
First downs	22	25
Total yards	351	446
Rushes/yards	32–171	40–123
Passing yards	180	323
Passing: Comp–Att–Int	16–30–0	25–31–0
Time of possession	27:18	32:42

Team	Category	Player	Statistics
Cincinnati	Passing	Brendan Sorsby	16/30, 180 yards, 2 TD
Cincinnati	Rushing	Corey Kiner	17 carries, 94 yards
Cincinnati	Receiving	Tony Johnson	4 receptions, 54 yards, TD
Colorado	Passing	Shedeur Sanders	25/30, 323 yards, 2 TD
Colorado	Rushing	Isaiah Augustave	22 carries, 91 yards, TD
Colorado	Receiving	Travis Hunter	9 receptions, 153 yards, 2 TD

=== vs West Virginia (rivalry) ===
West Virginia Mountaineers (4–4) vs Cincinnati Bearcats (5–3) – Game summary

Quarter	1	2	3	4	Total
Mountaineers	0	17	7	7	31
Bearcats	7	0	7	10	24

at Nippert Stadium • Cincinnati

- Date: November 9, 2024
- Game time: 12:00 p.m.
- Game weather: Temperature: 58 °F (14 °C), Weather: Sunny, Wind: E 10 miles per hour (16 km/h)
- Game attendance: 38,007
- Referee: Kevin Boitmann
- TV announcers (FS1): Chris Myers (play-by-play) and Robert Smith (analyst)
- Recap

Game information

First quarter

- (5:17) CIN – Corey Kiner 2-yard run, Nathan Hawks kick (Drive: 13 plays, 68 yards, 6:04; Cincinnati 7–0)

Second quarter

- (12:31) WVU – Anthony Wilson Jr. 79-yard Interception Return, Michael Hayes II kick; Tied 7–7)
- (8:48) WVU – Michael Haey II 24-yard field goal (Drive: 5 plays, 31 yards, 2:27; West Virginia 10–7)
- (3:37) WVU – Justin Robinson 10-yard pass from Nicco Marchiol, Michael Hayes II kick (Drive: 3 plays, 41 yards, 1:08; West Virginia 17–74)

Third quarter

- (8:29) WVU – Nicco Marchiol 10-yard run, Michael Hayes II kick (Drive: 6 plays, 51 yards, 3:42; West Virginia 24–7)
- (3:51) CIN – Evan Pryor 80-yard pass from Brendan Sorsby, Nathan Hawks kick (Drive: 1 plays, 80 yards, 0:13; West Virginia 24–14)

Fourth quarter

- (9:20) CIN – Brendan Sorsby 12-yard run, Nathan Hawks kick (Drive: 11 plays, 71 yards, 5:19; Cincinnati 24–21)
- (3:51) WVU – Tyrin Bradley Jr. 14-yard Recovery, Michael Hayes II kick; West Virginia 31–21)
- (1:39) CIN – Nathan Hawks 29-yard field goal (Drive: 14 plays, 64 yards, 2:54; West Virginia 31–24)

Statistics	WVU	CIN
First downs	10	24
Total yards	238	436
Rushing yards	92	157
Passing yards	156	279
Passing: Comp–Att–Int	9–15–1	25–36–1
Time of possession	25:04	34:56

Team	Category	Player	Statistics
West Virginia	Passing	Nicco Marchiol	9/15, 156 yards, 1 TD, 1 INT
West Virginia	Rushing	Jahiem White	13 carries, 67 yards
West Virginia	Receiving	Justin Robinson	2 receptions, 60 yards, 1 TD
Cincinnati	Passing	Brendan Sorsby	25/36, 279 yards, 1 TD, 1 INT
Cincinnati	Rushing	Corey Kiner	25 carries, 94 yards, 1 TD
Cincinnati	Receiving	Evan Pryor	5 receptions, 100 yards, 1 TD

=== at Iowa State ===
Cincinnati Bearcats (5–4) at Iowa State Cyclones (7–2) – Game summary

Quarter	1	2	3	4	Total
Bearcats	7	3	0	7	17
Cyclones	7	3	10	14	34

at Jack Trice Stadium • Ames, IA

- Date: November 16, 2024
- Game time: 8:00 p.m.
- Game weather: Temperature: 54 °F (12 °C), Weather: Cloudy, Wind: E 17 miles per hour (27 km/h)
- Game attendance: 52,881
- Referee: Stephen Baron
- TV announcers (FOX): Tim Brando (play-by-play), Devin Gardner (analyst), and Josh Sims (sideline reporter)

Game information

First quarter

- (9:56) CIN – Evan Pryor 12-yard run, Nathan Hawks kick (Drive: 10 plays, 75 yards, 5:04; Cincinnati 7–0)
- (1:53) ISU – Carson Hansen 2-yard run, Kyle Konrardy kick (Drive: 5 plays, 39 yards, 1:52; Tied 7–7)

Second quarter

- (12:18) CIN – Nathan Hawks 29-yard field goal (Drive: 8 plays, 59 yards, 4:28; Cincinnati 10–7)
- (0:08) ISU – Kyle Konrardy 37-yard field goal (Drive: 6 plays, 20 yards, 0:27; Tied 10–10)

Third quarter

- (10:04) ISU – Stevo Klotz 26-yard pass from Rocco Becht, Kyle Konrardy kick (Drive: 9 plays, 76 yards, 4:50; Iowa State 17–10)
- (2:53) ISU – Kyle Konrardy 52-yard field goal (Drive: 9 plays, 38 yards, 3:50; Iowa State 20–10)

Fourth quarter

- (11:44) CIN – Brendan Sorsby 41-yard run, Nathan Hawks kick (Drive: 4 plays, 40 yards, 1:51; Iowa State 20–17)
- (4:04) ISU – Rocco Becht 15-yard run, Kyle Konrardy kick (Drive: 15 plays, 68 yards, 7:33; Iowa State 27–17)
- (1:09) ISU – Abu Sama 27-yard run, Kyle Konrardy kick (Drive: 7 plays, 71 yards, 2:08; Iowa State 34–17)

Statistics	CIN	ISU
First downs	15	21
Total yards	353	386
Rushing yards	287	152
Passing yards	66	234
Passing: Comp–Att–Int	10–18–0	24–35–0
Time of possession	28:12	31:48

Team	Category	Player	Statistics
Cincinnati	Passing	Brendan Sorsby	10/18, 66 yards
Cincinnati	Rushing	Brendan Sorsby	13 carries, 143 yards, TD
Cincinnati	Receiving	Tony Johnson	3 receptions, 43 yards
Iowa State	Passing	Rocco Becht	24/33, 234 yards, TD
Iowa State	Rushing	Abu Sama	12 carries, 52 yards, TD
Iowa State	Receiving	Gabe Burkle	6 receptions, 73 yards

=== at Kansas State ===
Cincinnati Bearcats (5–5) at Kansas State Wildcats (7–3) – Game summary

Quarter	1	2	3	4	Total
Bearcats	0	3	6	6	15
Wildcats	10	17	0	14	41

at Bill Snyder Family Stadium • Manhattan, KS

- Date: November 23, 2024
- Game time: 8:00 p.m.
- Game weather: Temperature: 54 °F (12 °C), Weather: Clear, Wind: SE 4 miles per hour (6.4 km/h)
- Game attendance: 50,988
- Referee: Luke Richmond
- TV announcers (ESPN2): Brian Custer (play-by-play), Rod Gilmore (analyst), and Lauren Sisler (sideline reporter)
- Recap

Game information

First quarter

- (11:25) KSU – Avery Johnson 21-yard run, Chris Tennant kick (Drive: 5 plays, 65 yards, 2:08; Kansas State 7–0)
- (3:37) KSU – Chris Tennant 28-yard field goal (Drive: 8 plays, 56 yards, 4:36; Kansas State 10–0)

Second quarter

- (13:37) KSU – Chris Tennant 32-yard field goal (Drive: 7 plays, 41 yards, 3:01; Kansas State 13–0)
- (7:01) KSU – DJ Giddens 32-yard run, Chris Tennant kick (Drive: 4 plays, 67 yards, 2:02; Kansas State 20–0)
- (4:17) CIN – Nathan Hawks 42-yard field goal (Drive: 7 plays, 52 yards, 2:05; Kansas State 20–3)
- (0:50) KSU – Tre Spivey 6-yard pass from Avery Johnson, Chris Tennant kick (Drive: 2 plays, 6 yards, 0:10; Kansas State 27–3)

Third quarter

- (4:54) CIN – Tony Johnson 9-yard pass from Brendan Sorsby (Drive: 11 plays, 80 yards, 5:40; Kansas State 27–9)

Fourth quarter

- (14:52) KSU – DJ Giddens 17-yard run, Chris Tennant kick (Drive: 11 plays, 73 yards, 4:56; Kansas State 34–9)
- (7:57) KSU – Will Swanson 8-yard pass from Avery Johnson, Chris Tennant kick (Drive: 8 plays, 50 yards, 4:20; Kansas State 41–9)
- (5:09) CIN – Tony Johnson 6-yard pass from Brendan Sorsby (Drive: 7 plays, 75 yards, 2:48; Kansas State 41–15)

Statistics	CIN	KSU
First downs	21	22
Total yards	374	428
Rushing yards	174	281
Passing yards	200	147
Passing: Comp–Att–Int	21–40–1	13–23–0
Time of possession	28:46	31:14

Team	Category	Player	Statistics
Cincinnati	Passing	Brendan Sorsby	21/39, 200 YDS, 2 TD, 1 INT
Cincinnati	Rushing	Corey Kiner	15 ATT, 140 YDS, 0 TD
Cincinnati	Receiving	Xzavier Henderson	4 REC, 60 YDS, O TD
Kansas State	Passing	Avery Johnson	13/23, 147 YDS, 2 TD, 0 INT
Kansas State	Rushing	DJ Giddens	15 ATT, 143 YDS, 2 TD
Kansas State	Receiving	Tre Spivey	5 REC, 63 YDS, 1 TD

=== vs TCU ===
TCU Horned Frogs (7–4) vs Cincinnati Bearcats (5–6) – Game summary

Quarter	1	2	3	4	Total
Horned Frogs	7	13	0	0	20
Bearcats	0	0	7	6	13

at Nippert Stadium • Cincinnati

- Date: November 30, 2024
- Game time: 6:00 p.m.
- Game weather: Temperature: 32 °F (0 °C), Weather: Cloudy, Wind: 0 miles per hour (0 km/h)
- Game attendance: 30,021
- Referee: Mike McCabe
- TV announcers (ESPN+): Richard Cross (play-by-play) and Barrett Brooks (analyst)
- Recap

Game information

First quarter

- (11:18) TCU – Savion Williams 2-yard run, Kyle Lemmermann kick (Drive: 7 plays, 29 yards, 2:50; TCU 7–0)

Second quarter

- (14:47) TCU – Kyle Lemmermann 27-yard field goal (Drive: 8 plays, 46 yards, 2:58; TCU 10–0)
- (11:12) CIN – Corey Kiner 1-yard run, Nathan Hawks kick (Drive: 7 plays, 75 yards, 3:35; TCU 10–7)
- (7:34) TCU – Savion Williams 2-yard run, Kyle Lemmermann kick (Drive: 7 plays, 65 yards, 3:38; TCU 14–7)
- (3:34) TCU – Kyle Lemmermann 35-yard field goal (Drive: 7 plays, 17 yards, 1:58; TCU 20–7)

Third quarter

No scoring plays

Fourth quarter

- (5:15) CIN – Brenden Sorsby 8-yard run, (Drive: 12 plays, 94 yards, 3:51; TCU 20–13)

Statistics	TCU	CIN
First downs	17	23
Total yards	336	373
Rushing yards	124	213
Passing yards	212	160
Passing: Comp–Att–Int	18–35–1	21–35–1
Time of possession	28:29	31:31

Team	Category	Player	Statistics
TCU	Passing	Josh Hoover	18/35, 212 yards, 0 TD, 1 INT
TCU	Rushing	Hauss Hejny	8 carries, 41 yards
TCU	Receiving	Blake Nowell	3 receptions, 75 yards
Cincinnati	Passing	Brendan Sorsby	21/34, 160 yards, 1 INT
Cincinnati	Rushing	Corey Kiner	23 carries, 117 yards, 1 TD
Cincinnati	Receiving	Xzavier Henderson	3 receptions, 46 yards

== Personnel ==
=== Roster and staff ===
2024 Cincinnati Bearcats football team roster
Players
Coaches
Offense

Pos.	#	Name	Class
WR	0	Tony Johnson	Jr
QB	2	Brendan Sorsby	So
WR	3	Evan Prater	Sr
WR	4	Tyrin Smith	Sr
QB	5	Samaj Jones	Fr
RB	6	Evan Pryor	Jr
RB	7	Chance Williams	Jr
WR	8	Xzavier Henderson	Sr
WR	9	Aaron Turner	Sr
WR	10	Jamoi Mayes	Sr
TE	11	Joe Royer	Jr
QB	12	Danny Stoddard	Fr
QB	13	Jacob Hoying	Jr
WR	14	Barry Jackson	Fr
QB	15	Will Kocher	So
QB	16	Brady Lichtenberg	Jr
TE	17	Joey Beljan	Sr
WR	18	Kale Woodburn	Fr
WR	19	Dakari Anderson	Fr
RB	20	Jakorion Coffey	Fr
RB	21	Corey Kiner	Sr
WR	22	Zane Kinsey	Fr
RB	23	Brian Doneghy II	Sr
RB	24	Victor Dawson	Jr
RB	29	Manny Covey	Fr
TE	44	Francis Sherman	Sr
OL	50	Evan Tengesdahl	Fr
OL	53	Gavin Gerhardt (C)	Sr
OL	54	Dartanyan Tinsley	Sr
OL	56	Deondre Buford	Jr
OL	59	Jake Wheelock	Fr
OL	63	Zac Clarke	Fr
OL	66	Xavier Lozowicki	So
OL	67	Luke Kendra (C)	Sr
OL	69	JP Schrieber	Fr
OL	71	Judea Milon	Jr
OL	73	Aiden Pastoriza	Fr
OL	74	Phillip Wilder	Sr
OL	75	John Williams	Sr
OL	77	Jonathan Harder	So
OL	78	Grant Edgington	So
OL	79	Ethan Green	So
WR	80	Elijah Jones	Fr
WR	81	Michael Mussari	Fr
TE	82	Michael McCalmont	Sr
TE	83	Devyn Zahursky	Fr
WR	84	Sterling Berkhalter	Jr
TE	85	Lyviel Waters	Fr
WR	86	Ayden Boykin	Fr
TE	87	Gavin Grover	Fr
WR	88	Nash Biglin	So

Defense

Pos.	#	Name	Class
S	0	Joshua Minkins	Sr
CB	1	Jordan Young	Jr
DT	2	Dontay Corleone (C)	Jr
S	3	Kye Stokes	So
DE	4	Mikah Coleman (injured)	Jr
S	5	D.J. Taylor	Sr
S	6	Trevon Gola-Callard	Jr
LB	7	Jared Bartlett	Sr
CB	8	Ormanie Arnold	So
STAR	9	Jiquan Sanks	Fr
DB	10	Derrick Canteen (C)	Sr
LB	11	Jake Golday	Jr
LB	12	Brady Drogosh	Fr
S	13	Logan Wilson	Sr
CB	14	Zay Johnson	Fr
DL	15	Kameron Wilson	Jr
CB	16	Jordan Robertson	Jr
LB	17	Brian Simms III	Fr
STAR	18	Marqavious Saboor	Fr
CB	19	Quinton Price	Fr
STAR	20	Mehki Miller	Sr
CB	21	Kalen Carroll	So
LB	22	Jonathan Thompson	So
CB	23	Willie Goodwyn	Fr
DE	24	Darian Varner	Sr
CB	25	Daniel James	Fr
DL	26	Cam Roetherford	So
S	27	Ken Willis	So
CB	29	Stanley Clyne	Fr
S	30	Tavier Lugo-Flowers	Fr
LB	31	Simeon Coleman	Fr
S	32	Maxwell Cummings	Fr
S	33	Zander Blue	Jr
LB	34	Noah Miller	Fr
S	35	Drew Robinson	Fr
LB	36	Christian Commisso	Fr
OLB	37	Trevor Adams	Jr
LB	38	Nijal Mooney	Jr
LB	39	Cincear Lewis (injured)	So
DE	40	Kamari Burns	Fr
LB	41	Quinn Staten	Fr
LB	42	Connor Keyes	Jr
LB	44	Montay Weedon	Fr
STAR	46	Antwan Peek Jr.	So
LB	49	Jack Dingle	Jr
DL	52	Garrison Butler	Fr
DT	57	Ben Blevins	Jr
DT	90	Jalen Hunt (injured)	Sr
DE	91	Drew Logan	So
DL	92	Nick Herbst	Jr
DL	93	Harris Adams	Jr
DT	94	Kelian Smith	Fr
DL	95	Lendric Barber	Fr
DE	96	Nathan Nunn	Fr
DE	97	Eric Phillips	Sr
DL	98	Marquaze Parker	Fr
DE	99	Rob Jackson	Jr

Special teams

Pos.	#	Name	Class
P	30	Max Fletcher	Jr
P	31	Mason Fletcher	Sr
K	33	Carter Brown	Jr
P	35	Brady Young	Jr
LS	43	Jayden Perry	Sr
LS	47	George Leibold	Fr
LS	48	Weston Simmons	Fr
P	89	Ben Mehan	Fr
K	93	Max LeMasters	Fr
K	96	Nathan Hawks	Sr

Head coach

- Scott Satterfield (Appalachian State) – 2nd year

Coordinators/assistant coaches

- Brad Glenn (Clemson)
  2nd year – (Offensive coordinator/Wide receivers)
- Tyson Veidt (Muskingum)
  1st year – (Defensive coordinator/Safeties)
- Kerry Coombs (Dayton)
  3nd year (8th overall) – (Special teams coordinator/Cornerbacks)
- Nate Fuqua (Wofford)
  2nd year – (Co-defensive coordinator/Outside linebackers)
- Cortney Braswell (Liberty)
  2nd year – (Linebackers)
- Nick Cardwell (Appalachian State)
  2nd year – (Offensive line)
- Sean Dawkins (Troy)
  1st year – (Offensive line)
- Josh Stepp (Newberry)
  2nd year – (Tight Ends)
- Walter Stewart (Cincinnati)
  3rd year – (Defensive line)
- Pete Thomas (NC State)
  2nd year – (Quarterbacks)

Legend

- (C) Team captain
- (S) Suspended
- (I) Ineligible
- Injured
- Redshirt

Roster

== Awards and honors ==
Big 12 Weekly Honors
Date	Player	Class	Position	Award	Ref.
September 2	Brendan Sorsby	RS-So	QB	Big 12 Newcomer of the Week	
September 28	Brendan Sorsby	RS-So	QB	Big 12 Newcomer of the Week	
October 12	Jake Golday	Jr	LB	Big 12 Newcomer of the Week	

=== All-Big 12 ===
All-Big 12
Player	Position	1st/2nd team
Joe Royer	TE	1st
Luke Kandra	OL	1st
Dontay Corleone	DL	2nd
Jared Bartlett	LB	HM
Mason Fletcher	P	HM
Jake Golday	LB	HM
Jiquan Sanks	DB	HM
Brendan Sorsby	QB	HM
HM = Honorable mention. Source:
