= 2024 Kansas State Wildcats football team =

American college football season

2024 Kansas State Wildcats football

Rate Bowl champion

Rate Bowl, W 44–41 vs. Rutgers
- Conference: Big 12 Conference
- Record: 9–4 (5–4 Big 12)
- Head coach: Chris Klieman (6th season)
- Co-offensive coordinators: Matt Wells (1st season); Conor Riley (1st season)
- Offensive scheme: Spread
- Defensive coordinator: Joe Klanderman (5th season)
- Base defense: 3–3–5
- Home stadium: Bill Snyder Family Football Stadium

Uniform
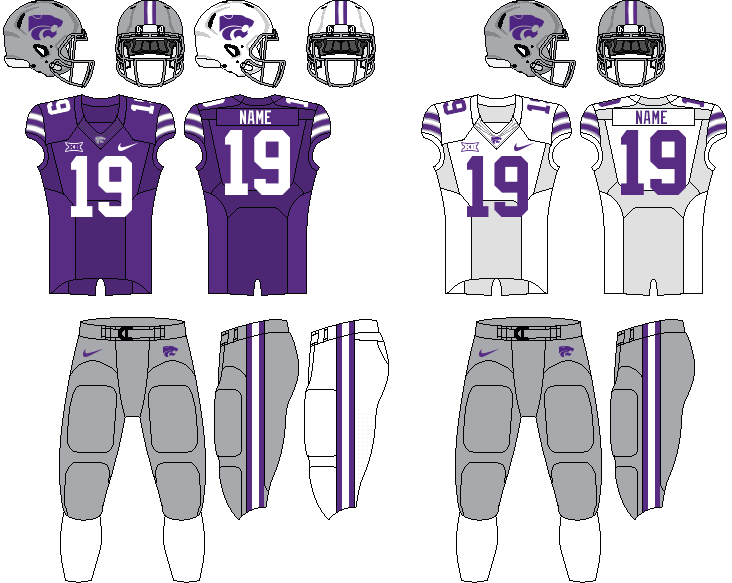

2024 Big 12 Conference football standings
	Conf.			Overall
Team	W		L	W		L
No. 7 Arizona State y$^	7	–	2	11	–	3
No. 15 Iowa State y	7	–	2	11	–	3
No. 13 BYU	7	–	2	11	–	2
No. 25 Colorado	7	–	2	9	–	4
Baylor	6	–	3	8	–	5
TCU	6	–	3	9	–	4
Texas Tech	6	–	3	8	–	5
Kansas State	5	–	4	9	–	4
West Virginia	5	–	4	6	–	7
Kansas	4	–	5	5	–	7
Cincinnati	3	–	6	5	–	7
Houston	3	–	6	4	–	8
Utah	2	–	7	5	–	7
UCF	2	–	7	4	–	8
Arizona	2	–	7	4	–	8
Oklahoma State	0	–	9	3	–	9
Championship: Arizona State 45, Iowa State 19
^ – College Football Playoff participant; $ – Conference champion; y – Championship game participant; Rankings from AP Poll

The 2024 Kansas State Wildcats football team represented Kansas State University in the Big 12 Conference during the 2024 NCAA Division I FBS football season. The Wildcats were led by Chris Klieman in his sixth year as their head coach. They played their home games at Bill Snyder Family Football Stadium located in Manhattan, Kansas.

== Pre-season ==
=== Players drafted into the NFL ===
Round	Pick	NFL team	Player	Position
2	53	Washington Commanders	Ben Sinnott	TE
3	73	Dallas Cowboys	Cooper Beebe	G
7	254	Los Angeles Rams	KT Leveston	G

=== Big 12 media poll ===
The preseason poll was released on July 2, 2024.

Big 12
Predicted finish	Team	Votes (1st place)
1	Utah	906 (20)
2	Kansas State	889 (19)
3	Oklahoma State	829 (14)
4	Kansas	772 (5)
5	Arizona	762 (3)
6	Iowa State	661
7	West Virginia	581
8	UCF	551
9	Texas Tech	532
10	TCU	436
11	Colorado	400
12	Baylor	268
13	BYU	215
14	Cincinnati	196
15	Houston	157
16	Arizona State	141

- First place votes in ()

== Schedule ==
Date	Time	Opponent	Rank	Site	TV	Result	Attendance
August 31	6:00 p.m.	UT Martin*	No. 18	Bill Snyder Family Football Stadium; Manhattan, KS	ESPN+	W 41–6	51,240
September 7	11:00 a.m.	at Tulane*	No. 17	Yulman Stadium; New Orleans, LA	ESPN	W 34–27	25,034
September 13	7:00 p.m.	No. 20 Arizona (Note: Although both Kansas State and Arizona are in the Big 12, this game did not count in the conference standings due to the game being scheduled before Arizona joined the Big 12.)*	No. 14	Bill Snyder Family Football Stadium; Manhattan, KS	FOX	W 31–7	51,290
September 21	9:30 p.m.	at BYU	No. 13	LaVell Edwards Stadium; Provo, UT	ESPN	L 9–38	64,201
September 28	11:00 a.m.	No. 20 Oklahoma State	No. 23	Bill Snyder Family Football Stadium; Manhattan, KS	ESPN	W 42–20	51,741
October 12	9:15 p.m.	at Colorado	No. 18	Folsom Field; Boulder, CO (rivalry)	ESPN	W 31–28	53,972
October 19	6:30 p.m.	at West Virginia	No. 17	Milan Puskar Stadium; Morgantown, WV	FOX	W 45–18	54,327
October 26	7:00 p.m.	Kansas^{†}	No. 16	Bill Snyder Family Football Stadium; Manhattan, KS (Sunflower Showdown)	ESPN2	W 29–27	52,074
November 2	2:30 p.m.	at Houston	No. 17	TDECU Stadium; Houston, TX	FOX	L 19–24	23,085
November 16	6:00 p.m.	Arizona State	No. 16	Bill Snyder Family Football Stadium; Manhattan, KS	ESPN	L 14–24	51,880
November 23	7:00 p.m.	Cincinnati		Bill Snyder Family Football Stadium; Manhattan, KS	ESPN2	W 41–15	50,988
November 30	6:30 p.m.	at No. 18 Iowa State	No. 24	Jack Trice Stadium; Ames, IA (Farmageddon)	FOX	L 21–29	56,228
December 26	4:30 p.m.	vs. Rutgers*		Chase Field; Phoenix, AZ (Rate Bowl)	ESPN	W 44–41	21,659
*Non-conference game; ^{†}Homecoming; Rankings from AP Poll (and CFP Rankings, after November 5) - Released prior to game; All times are in Central time

== Game summaries ==
=== vs. UT Martin (FCS) ===
Game One – UT Martin Skyhawks (FCS) (0–0) vs No. 18 Kansas State Wildcats (0–0) – Game summary

Quarter	1	2	3	4	Total
Skyhawks (FCS)	0	3	3	0	6
No. 18 Wildcats	14	3	10	14	41

at Bill Snyder Family Stadium • Manhattan, KS

- Date: Saturday, August 31, 2024
- Game time: 6:00 p.m.
- Game weather: 85 °F (29 °C)
- Game attendance: 51,240
- Referee: Luke Richmond
- TV announcers (ESPN+): Mark Neely (play-by-play) and Ahman Green (analyst)

Game information

First quarter

- (6:30) KSU – Brayden Loftin 23 yard pass from Avery Johnson, Chris Tennant kick (Drive: 7 plays, 80 yards, 3:00; KSU 7–0)
- (4:24) KSU – Colby McCalister 1 yard punt return, Chris Tennant kick (Drive: 3 plays, -8 yards, 2:06; KSU 14–0)

Second quarter

- (7:16) UTM – Jaren Van Winkle 34 yard field goal (Drive: 8 plays, 51 yards, 5:27; KSU 14–3)
- (0:21) KSU – Chris Tennant 43 yard field goal (Drive: 7 plays, 40 yards, 3:02; KSU 17–3)

Third quarter

- (9:29) UTM – Jaren Van Winkle 31 yard field goal (Drive: 10 plays, 20 yards, 5:23; KSU 17–6)
- (5:39) KSU – Chris Tennant 45 yard field goal (Drive: 9 plays, 48 yards, 3:50; KSU 20–6)
- (0:59) KSU – Dylan Edwards 1 yard run, Chris Tennant kick (Drive: 6 plays, 71 yards, 2:27; KSU 27–6)

Fourth quarter

- (14:29) KSU – Dylan Edwards 15 yard pass from Avery Johnson, Chris Tennant kick (Drive: 2 plays, 63 yards, 0:31; KSU 34–6)
- (8:19) KSU – La'James White 12 yard run, Chris Tennant kick (Drive: 6 plays, 65 yards, 2:57; KSU 41–6)

Statistics	UTM	KSU
First downs	8	20
Total yards	134	449
Rushing yards	36	283
Passing yards	98	166
Passing: Comp–Att–Int	10-17-0	16-25-1
Time of possession	33:30	26:30

Team	Category	Player	Statistics
UT Martin	Passing	Kinkead Dent	7-14, 87 yds, 0 TD, 0 INT
UT Martin	Rushing	Patrick Smith	9 att, 23 yds, 0 TD
UT Martin	Receiving	Trevonte Rucker	1 rec, 45 yds, 0 TD
Kansas State	Passing	Avery Johnson	14-24, 153 yds, 2 TD, 1 INT
Kansas State	Rushing	D.J. Giddens	13 att, 128 yds
Kansas State	Receiving	Jayce Brown	5 rec, 71 yds

The No. 18 Kansas State Wildcats opened their 2024 season with a 41-6 victory over UT Martin at Bill Snyder Family Stadium. Quarterback Avery Johnson led the Wildcats by throwing two touchdown passes—including a 23-yard connection with Brayden Loftin—finishing with 153 passing yards. The Wildcats’ defense held the Skyhawks throughout the game and allowing only 134 total yards while recording four sacks. Kansas State's special teams also made a significant impact, highlighted by a blocked punt by Ty Bowman that resulted in a touchdown recovery by Colby McCalister.

The Wildcats' defense remained strong, limiting UT Martin's rushing attack to just 36 yards on 38 carries. The win marked a solid start for the Wildcats, demonstrating balanced contributions from offense, defense, and special teams. Coach Chris Kleiman emphasized the need to improve despite the convincing win, pointing to a challenging road game against Tulane next week.

Competing in Division I FCS, UT Martin is a member of the Big South–OVC Football Association and ended the 2023 season with a record of 8 wins and 3 losses. including a 48-7 loss to then #1 ranked Georgia.

=== at Tulane ===
No. 17 Kansas State Wildcats (1–0) at Tulane Green Wave (1–0) – Game summary

Quarter	1	2	3	4	Total
No. 17 Wildcats	3	7	10	14	34
Green Wave	7	13	0	7	27

at Yulman Stadium • New Orleans, LA

- Date: September 7, 2024
- Game time: 11:00 a.m.
- Game weather: Temperature: 76 °F (24 °C) • Wind: NE at 11 miles per hour (18 km/h) • Weather: Cloudy
- Game attendance: 25,034
- Referee: Kevin Boitmann
- TV announcers (ESPN): Bob Wischusen (play-by-play), Louis Riddick (analyst), and Kris Budden (sideline reporter)

Game information

First quarter

- (3:05) KSU – Chris Tennant 48-yard field goal (Drive: 12 plays, 58 yards, 5:59; Kansas State 3–0)
- (0:49) TUL – Makhi Hughes 3-yard run, Jacob Barnes kick (Drive: 5 plays, 73 yards, 2:09; Tulane 7–3)

Second quarter

- (13:17) TUL – Alex Bauman 36-yard pass from Darian Mensah, Jacob Barnes kick (Drive: 2 plays, 38 yards, 1:03; Tulane 14–3)
- (10:16) KSU – Will Swanson 7-yard pass from Avery Johnson, Chris Tennant kick (Drive: 6 plays, 75 yards, 3:04; Tulane 14–10)
- (4:57) TUL – Jacob Barnes 40-yard field goal (Drive: 11 plays, 57 yards, 5:12; Tulane 17–10)
- (1:01) TUL – Jacob Barnes 41-yard field goal (Drive: 7 plays, 45 yards, 2:44; Tulane 20–10)

Third quarter

- (7:49) KSU – Chris Tennant 28-yard field goal (Drive: 7 plays, 65 yards, 3:38; Tulane 20–13)
- (2:26) KSU – DJ Giddens 45-yard pass from Avery Johnson, Chris Tennant (Drive: 5 plays, 66 yards, 2:50; Tied 20–20)

Fourth quarter

- (14:01) TUL – Alex Bauman 13-yard pass from Darian Mensah, Jacob Barnes kick (Drive: 6 plays, 56 yards, 3:17; Tulane 27–20)
- (11:20) KSU – Dylan Edwards 13-yard run, Chris Tennant kick (Drive: 6 plays, 75 yards, 2:41; Tied 27–27)
- (8:13) KSU – Jack Fabris 60-yard fumble recovery, Chris Tennant kick (Kansas State 34–27)

Statistics	KSU	TULN
First downs	19	21
Total yard	396	491
Rushing yards	215	149
Passing yards	181	342
Passing: Comp–Att–Int	15–23–0	19–29–1
Time of possession	26:44	33:11

Team	Category	Player	Statistics
Kansas State	Passing	Avery Johnson	15/23, 181 yards, 2 TD
Kansas State	Rushing	DJ Giddens	19 carries, 114 yards
Kansas State	Receiving	DJ Giddens	4 receptions, 63 yards, TD
Tulane	Passing	Darian Mensah	19/29, 342 yards, 2 TD, INT
Tulane	Rushing	Makhi Hughes	21 carries, 128 yards, TD
Tulane	Receiving	Mario Williams	6 receptions, 128 yards

In what was called hard-fought road game, the No. 17 Kansas State Wildcats pulled off a 34-27 victory over Tulane, securing their second win of the 2024 season. Kansas State’s defense made critical plays in the fourth quarter. Safety Jack Fabris returned a Tulane fumble 60 yards for a go-ahead touchdown.

Darian Mensah's sharp passing helped Tulane build an early lead, finding Dontae Fleming for a 53-yard completion to set up a touchdown and connecting with Alex Bauman for a 36-yard score.

On offense for Kansas State, Avery Johnson threw two touchdown passes. DJ Giddens continued his strong season with 114 rushing yards and a 45-yard touchdown catch on fourth down.

Tulane led for much of the game. Major impact came by Darian Mensah's 342-yard, two-touchdown performance and supported by key plays from receiver Mario Williams and running back Makhi Hughes.

Tulane's offense did not continue the same performance during the second half, allowing Kansas State to mount a comeback. Kansas State's DJ Giddens played a pivotal role in the rally by rushing for 118 yards and catching a 45-yard touchdown on fourth down to tie the game. Tulane's final opportunity to tie the game was undone by an offensive pass interference penalty that nullified a touchdown with 17 seconds remaining. Two plays later, VJ Payne’s interception in the end zone sealed the win for the Wildcats in the final seconds.

The next day's college football rankings put Kansas State at #14 in the AP Top 25 and #15 in the AFCA Coaches Poll. Tulane remained unranked.

=== vs No. 20 Arizona ===
No. 20 Arizona Wildcats (2–0) vs No. 14 Kansas State Wildcats (2–0) – Game summary

Quarter	1	2	3	4	Total
No. 20 Arizona	7	0	0	0	7
No. 14 Kansas State	7	7	14	3	31

at Bill Snyder Family Stadium • Manhattan, KS

- Date: September 13, 2024
- Game time: 6:00 p.m.
- Game weather: 86 °F (30 °C)
- Game attendance: 51,290
- Referee: Kevin Mar
- TV announcers (FOX): Tim Brando (play-by-play), Devin Gardner (analyst), and Josh Sims (sideline)

Game information

First quarter

- (7:26) ARIZ – Quali Conley 1-yard run, Tyler Loop kick (Drive: 14 plays, 73 yards, 7:28; Arizona 7–0)
- (1:01) KSU – Will Swanson 3-yard pass from Avery Johnson, Chris Tennant kick (Drive: 15 plays, 75 yards, 6:25; Tied 7–7)

Second quarter

- (14:37) KSU – Dylan Edwards 71-yard punt return, Chris Tennant kick (Kansas State 14–7)

Third quarter

- (9:29) KSU – Brayden Loftin 9-yard pass from Avery Johnson, Chris Tennant kick (Drive: 6 plays, 86 yards, 2:38; Kansas State 21–7)
- (0:34) KSU – DJ Giddens 1-yard run, Chris Tennant kick (Drive: 11 plays, 83 yards, 5:51; Kansas State 28–7)

Fourth quarter

- (7:04) KSU – Chris Tennant 35-yard field goal (Drive: 7 plays, 46 yards, 4:41; Kansas State 31–7)

Statistics	ARIZ	KSU
First downs	16	21
Total yards	324	391
Rushing yards	56	235
Passing yards	268	156
Passing: Comp–Att–Int	26–42–1	14–23–0
Time of possession	30:41	29:19

Team	Category	Player	Statistics
Arizona	Passing	Noah Fifita	26-42, 268 YDS, 0 TD, 1 INT
Arizona	Rushing	Quali Conley	14 CAR, 48 YDS, 1 TD
Arizona	Receiving	Tetairoa McMillan	11 REC, 138 YDS, 0 TD
Kansas State	Passing	Avery Johnson	14-23, 156 YDS, 2 TD, 0 INT
Kansas State	Rushing	Avery Johnson	17 CAR, 110 YDS, 0 TD
Kansas State	Receiving	Jayce Brown	3 REC, 60 YDS, 0 TD

The No. 14 Kansas State Wildcats handed No. 20 Arizona its first loss of the season, winning 31-7 in Manhattan, Kansas. Arizona opened the game with a 14-play, 73-yard drive, capped off by Quali Conley's 1-yard touchdown run to take an early 7-0 lead. However, Kansas State responded with a methodical 15-play drive of their own, tying the game with a 3-yard touchdown catch by tight end Will Swanson. From there, Kansas State took control, with a 79-yard punt return touchdown by Dylan Edwards giving them a 14-7 lead in the second quarter, and they never looked back.

Kansas State quarterback Avery Johnson threw for 156 yards and two touchdowns while also rushing for 110 yards. Kansas State dominated on the ground, accumulating 235 rushing yards, the most Arizona had allowed since 2022. Arizona's offense struggled after their opening drive, gaining just 137 yards in the second half and failing to score again. Quarterback Noah Fifita threw for 268 yards but was intercepted once and failed to throw a touchdown pass for the first time in over two years. Penalties and special teams errors plagued Arizona throughout the game, stalling drives and giving Kansas State advantageous field positions.

Arizona struggled to establish a consistent running game, managing only 56 rushing yards, their lowest total of the season. Kansas State extended their lead with a 9-yard touchdown catch by Brayden Loftin in the third quarter and a 1-yard run by DJ Giddens, capping off back-to-back 80-yard drives to put the game out of reach. Kansas State's defense held strong, preventing Arizona from scoring on their final three possessions and forcing two turnovers on downs in the fourth quarter.

=== at BYU ===
No. 13 Kansas State Wildcats (3–0) at BYU Cougars (3–0) – Game summary

Quarter	1	2	3	4	Total
No. 13 Wildcats	3	3	3	0	9
Cougars	0	17	14	7	38

at LaVell Edwards Stadium • Provo, UT

- Date: September 21, 2024
- Game time: 9:30 pm
- Game weather: 65 °F (18 °C)
- Game attendance: 64,201
- Referee: Mike McCabe
- TV announcers (ESPN): Dave Flemming (play-by-play), Brock Osweiler (analyst), and Stormy Buonantony (sideline)

Game information

First quarter
Second quarter
Third quarter
Fourth quarter

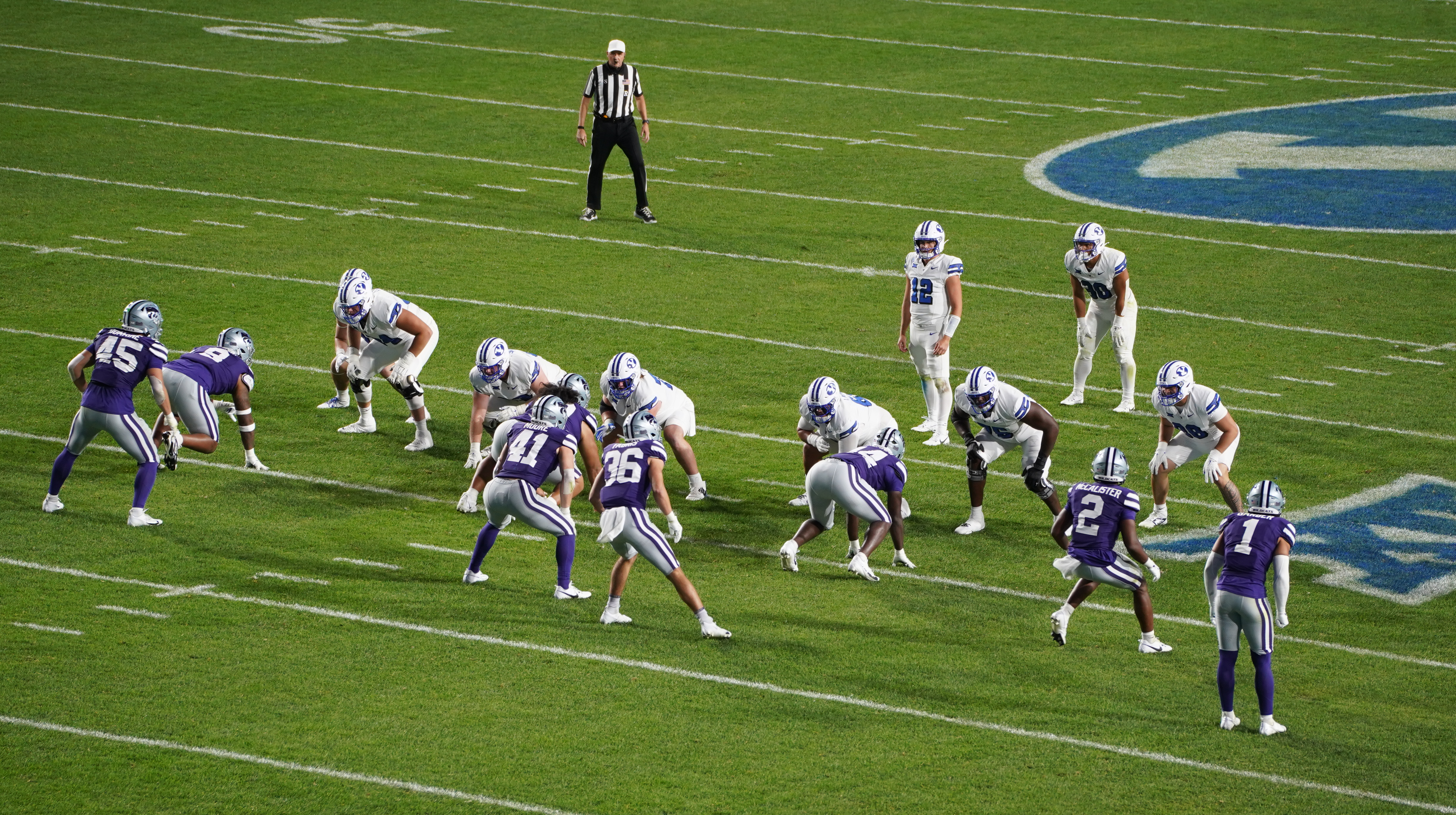

Statistics	KSU	BYU
First downs	17	14
Total yards	367	241
Rushing yards	228	92
Passing yards	139	149
Passing: Comp–Att–Int	16-29-2	15-21-0
Time of possession	33:03	26:57

Team	Category	Player	Statistics
Kansas State	Passing	Avery Johnson	15-28, 130 YDS, O TD, 2 INT
Kansas State	Rushing	DJ Giddens	19 CAR, 93 YDS, 0 TD
Kansas State	Receiving	Jayce Brown	4 REC, 51 YDS, 0 TD
BYU	Passing	Jake Retzlaff	15-21, 149 YDS, 2 TD, 0 INT
BYU	Rushing	Sione Moa	15 CAR, 76 YDS, 1 TD
BYU	Receiving	Chase Roberts	2 REC, 47 YDS, 1 TD

BYU upset No. 13 Kansas State 38-9 at LaVell Edwards Stadium, handing the Wildcats their first loss of the season. After Kansas State jumped out to a 6-0 lead with two Chris Tennant field goals, BYU took control in the second quarter and never looked back. The turning point came late in the first half when BYU’s defense forced two turnovers in quick succession. The first was a fumble recovered by freshman Tommy Prassas, who returned it 30 yards for a touchdown. Two plays later, defensive lineman Tyler Batty intercepted a screen pass that set up a 23-yard touchdown pass from Jake Retzlaff to Chase Roberts. BYU wrapped up a 17-6 halftime lead.

In the second half, BYU took advantage of another Kansas State turnover when Harrison Taggart intercepted Avery Johnson to set up a 3-yard touchdown pass from Retzlaff to Darius Lassiter. Parker Kingston then delivered a 90-yard punt return touchdown to extend BYU’s lead to 31-6 in the third quarter.

Kansas State’s offense struggled to execute in key moments. Quarterback Avery Johnson threw two interceptions and was sacked multiple times, while BYU's defensive pressure consistently disrupted the Wildcats’ rhythm. BYU running back Sione I. Moa also had a standout game, rushing for 76 yards and a touchdown. The win marked BYU’s first major Big 12 victory and highlighted their defensive strength, as they held Kansas State without a touchdown for the first time since 2020.

=== vs No. 20 Oklahoma State ===
No. 20 Oklahoma State Cowboys (3–1) vs No. 23 Kansas State Wildcats (3–1) – Game summary

Quarter	1	2	3	4	Total
No. 20 Cowboys	3	10	0	7	20
No. 23 Wildcats	7	14	14	7	42

at Bill Snyder Family Stadium • Manhattan, KS

- Date: September 28, 2024
- Game time: 11:00 a.m.
- Game weather: 70 °F (21 °C)
- Game attendance: 51,741
- Referee: Stephen Baron
- TV announcers (ESPN): Bob Wischusen (play-by-play), Louis Riddick (analyst), and Kris Budden (sideline)

Game information

First quarter

- (9:17) KSU – Avery Johnson 11 yard rush, Chris Tennant kick (Drive: 14 pays, 75 yards, 5:43; KSU 7–0)
- (5:36) OSU – Logan Ward 35 yard field goal (Drive: 8 plays, 65 yards, 3:41; KSU 7–3)

Second quarter

- (10:07) OSU – De'Zhaun Stribling 77 yard pass from Alan Bowman, Logan Ward kick (Drive: 2 plays, 82 yards, 0:50; OSU 10–7)
- (7:30) OSU – Logan Ward 31 yard field goal (Drive: 5 plays, 19 yards, 2:30; OSU 13–7)
- (6:58) KSU – Garrett Oakley 19 yard pass from Avery Johnson, Chris Tennant kick (Drive: 2 plays, 71 yards, 0:32; KSU 14–13)
- (3:18) KSU – Jayce Brown 55 yard pass from Avery Johnson, Chris Tennant kick (Drive: 4 plays, 69 yards, 1:48; KSU 21–13)

Third quarter

- (13:07) KSU – DJ Giddens 66 yard rush, Chris Tennant kick (Drive: 2 plays, 73 yards, 0:50; KSU 28–13)
- (1:57) KSU – Will Anciaux 2 yard pass from Avery Johnson, Chris Tennant kick (Drive: 6 plays, 73 yards, 2:48; KSU 35–13)

Fourth quarter

- (11:26) KSU – Avery Johnson 13 yard rush, Chris Tennant kick (Drive: 9 plays, 80 yards, 3:50; KSU 42–13)
- (1:52) OSU – Trent Howland 14 yard rush, Logan Ward kick (Drive: 8 plays, 69 yards, 2:48; KSU 42–20)

Statistics	OKST	KSU
First downs	25	23
Total yards	490	559
Rushing yards	126	300
Passing yards	354	259
Passing: Comp–Att–Int	26–50–2	19–31–1
Time of possession	30:49	29:11

Team	Category	Player	Statistics
Oklahoma State	Passing	Alan Bowman	26/50, 364 yards, TD, 2 INT
Oklahoma State	Rushing	Ollie Gordon II	15 carries, 76 yards
Oklahoma State	Receiving	De'Zhaun Stribling	7 receptions, 157 yards, TD
Kansas State	Passing	Avery Johnson	19/31, 259 yards, 3 TD, INT
Kansas State	Rushing	DJ Giddens	15 carries, 187 yards, TD
Kansas State	Receiving	Jayce Brown	4 receptions, 78 yards, TD

No. 23 Kansas State managed a 42-20 victory over higher-ranked No. 20 Oklahoma State in Manhattan, Kansas. Kansas State quarterback Avery Johnson accounted for five total touchdowns, passing for three and rushing for two, as the Wildcats overcame an early deficit to score 35 consecutive points. Johnson threw for 259 yards and rushed for another 60 while running back DJ Giddens led the ground attack with 187 rushing yards—including a 66-yard touchdown run early in the second half.

Oklahoma State started strong by taking a 10-7 lead with a 77-yard flea-flicker touchdown pass from Alan Bowman to De'Zhaun Stribling. However, costly mistakes derailed the Cowboys' momentum. After a second-quarter interception by Korie Black, Oklahoma State’s offense failed to capitalize, leading to a missed opportunity. Kansas State quickly regained control with big plays, including a 37-yard run and a touchdown following a horsecollar penalty.

Kansas State's defense forced three turnovers and limited running back Ollie Gordon II after a strong start. After the game was over, many considered the Kansas State victory to be pivotal in the Big 12 Championship race and predict the win to give them a crucial tiebreaker over a key conference opponent.

=== at Colorado (rivalry) ===
No. 18т Kansas State Wildcats (4–1) at Colorado Buffaloes (4–1) – Game summary

Quarter	1	2	3	4	Total
No. 18т Wildcats	7	7	10	7	31
Buffaloes	7	0	7	14	28

at Folsom Field • Boulder, CO

- Date: October 12, 2024
- Game time: 9:15 pm
- Game weather: Cloudy • Temperature: 68 °F (20 °C) • Wind: W at 6 miles per hour (9.7 km/h)
- Game attendance: 53,972
- Referee: David Alvarez
- TV announcers (ESPN): Mark Jones (play-by-play), Roddy Jones (analyst), and Quint Kessenich (sideline)

Game information

First quarter

- (7:06) COL – LaJohntay Wester 25-yard pass from Shedeur Sanders, Alejandro Mata kick (Drive: 9 plays, 49 yards, 4:02; Colorado 7–0)
- (0:44) KSU – Avery Johnson 8-yard run, Chris Tennant kick (Drive: 11 plays, 75 yards, 6:22; Tied 7–7)

Second quarter

- (1:52) KSU – Dylan Edwards 1-yard run, Chris Tennant kick (Drive: 8 plays, 60 yards, 3:26; Kansas State 14–7)

Third quarter

- (6:55) KSU – Jayce Brown 1-yard pass from Avery Johnson, Chris Tennant kick (Drive: 16 plays, 81 yards, 7:58; Kansas State 21–7)

(4:44) COL – Will Sheppard 7-yard pass from Shedeur Sanders, Alejandro Mata kick (Drive: 7 plays, 75 yards, 2:11; Kansas State 21–14)

- (0:28) KSU – Chris Tennant 48-yard field goal (Drive: 8 plays, 27 yards, 4:09; Kansas State 24–14)

Fourth quarter

- (6:44) COL – Isaiah Augustave 2-yard run, Alejandro Mata kick (Drive: 11 plays, 72 yards, 4:37; Kansas State 24–21)
- (3:12) COL – LaJohntay Wester 11-yard pass from Shedeur Sanders, Alejandro Mata kick (Drive: 2 plays, 17 yards, 0:39; Colorado 28–24)
- (2:14) Jayce Brown 50-yard pass from Avery Johnson, Chris Tennant kick (Drive: 3 plays, 84 yards, 0:51; Kansas State 31–28)

Statistics	KSU	COL
First downs	22	20
Total yards	423	359
Rushing yards	185	-29
Passing yards	238	388
Passing: Comp–Att–Int	17–26–1	34–40–1
Time of possession	35:00	25:00

Team	Category	Player	Statistics
Kansas State	Passing	Avery Johnson	15/23, 224 yards, 2 TD, INT
Kansas State	Rushing	DJ Giddens	25 carries, 182 yards
Kansas State	Receiving	Jayce Brown	6 receptions, 121 yards, 2 TD
Colorado	Passing	Shedeur Sanders	34/40, 388 yards, 3 TD, INT
Colorado	Rushing	Dallan Hayden	7 carries, 11 yards
Colorado	Receiving	Omarion Miller	8 receptions, 145 yards

In a back-and-forth game, No. 18 Kansas State narrowly defeated Colorado 31-28 at Folsom Field. Kansas State quarterback Avery Johnson orchestrated an 84-yard drive in just three plays, culminating in a 50-yard touchdown pass to Jayce Brown with 2:14 left on the clock. Johnson finished with two passing touchdowns, both to Brown, and added a rushing touchdown. Kansas State’s DJ Giddens led a strong ground game, rushing for 182 yards and becoming the first player this season to rush for over 100 yards against Colorado’s defense.

The Wildcats led 21-7 in the third quarter. Colorado mounted a comeback behind quarterback Shedeur Sanders, who threw for 388 yards and three touchdowns. Sanders connected with LaJohntay Wester for an 11-yard touchdown late in the game, giving Colorado a brief 28-24 lead. Moments before, Colorado had capitalized on a tipped interception returned 59 yards by cornerback Colton Hood (filling in for injured star Travis Hunter). Kansas State responded with Johnson's game-winning touchdown to reclaim the lead. Kansas State’s defense then held on Colorado’s final possession, stopping the Buffaloes on downs.

Injuries were a concern for Colorado, with Travis Hunter leaving due to a shoulder injury and several other key players missing time. Kansas State’s win marked a strong rebound following a challenging game against Oklahoma State, keeping them competitive in the Big 12 race.

=== at West Virginia ===
No. 17 Kansas State Wildcats (5–1) at West Virginia Mountaineers (3–3) – Game summary

Quarter	1	2	3	4	Total
No. 17 Wildcats	10	7	14	14	45
Mountaineers	3	7	0	8	18

at Milan Puskar Stadium • Morgantown, WV

- Date: October 19, 2024
- Game time: 6:30 p.m.
- Game weather: Clear • Temperature: 56 °F (13 °C) • Wind: NE at 2 miles per hour (3.2 km/h)
- Game attendance: 54,327
- Referee: Michael VanderVelde
- TV announcers (FOX): Connor Onion (play-by-play), Mark Helfrich (analyst), and Josh Sims (sideline)

Game information

First quarter

- (03:03) KSU – Chris Tennant, 44-yard field goal, (Drive: 10 plays, 37 yards, 05:16; KSU 3-0)
- (00:52) WVU – Michael Hayes II, 44-yard field goal, (Drive: 6 plays, 49 yards, 02:11; Tied 3-3)
- (00:21) KSU – Jadon Jackson, 60-yard TD pass from Avery Johnson, Tennant kick, (Drive: 2 plays, 84 yards, 0:26; KSU 10-3)

Second quarter

- (13:14) KSU – Marques Sigle, 43-yard interception return for TD, Tennant Kick, (KSU 17-3)
- (06:38) WVU – Hudson Clement, 7-yard TD pass from Garrett Greene, Hayes II kick, (Drive: 13 plays, 70 yards, 06:29; KSU 17-10)

Third quarter

- (09:38) KSU – Garrett Oakley, 16-yard TD pass from Johnson, Tennant kick, (Drive: 11 plays, 74 yards, 05:17; KSU 24-10)
- (04:48) KSU – Will Anciaux, 1-yard TD pass from Johnson, Tennant kick, (Drive: 7 plays, 69 yards, 03:17; KSU 31-10)

Fourth quarter

- (12:09) KSU – DJ Giddens, 1-yard TD run, Tennant kick, (Drive: 10 plays, 63 yards, 03:36; KSU 38-10)
- (08:22) WVU – Traylon Ray, 12-yard TD pass from Nicco Marchiol, Kole Taylor pass, (Drive: 7 plays, 69 yards, 03:41, KSU 38-18)
- (05:51) KSU – DJ Giddens, 18-yard TD run, Tennant kick, (Drive: 2 plays, 25 yards, 00:49, KSU 45-18)

Statistics	KSU	WVU
First downs	19	20
Total yards	412	295
Rushing yards	114	152
Passing yards	298	143
Passing: Comp–Att–Int	19–29–0	15–32–2
Time of possession	25:38	34:22

Team	Category	Player	Statistics
Kansas State	Passing	Avery Johnson	19-29, 298 YDS, 3 TD, 0 INT
Kansas State	Rushing	DJ Giddens	19 ATT, 57 YDS, 2 TD
Kansas State	Receiving	Jadon Jackson	2 REC, 84 YDS, 1 TD
West Virginia	Passing	Garrett Greene	9-19, 85 YDS, 1 TD, 2 INT
West Virginia	Rushing	Garrett Greene	11 CAR, 89 YDS, 0 TD
West Virginia	Receiving	Kole Taylor	4 REC, 61 YDS, 0 TD

No. 17 Kansas State secured a 45-18 victory over West Virginia at Milan Puskar Stadium, led by a career-best passing performance from sophomore quarterback Avery Johnson. Johnson threw for 298 yards and three touchdowns, with key scoring passes to Jadon Jackson, Garrett Oakley, and Will Anciaux. Kansas State’s defense also contributed significantly, as senior safety Marques Sigle returned an interception 43 yards for a touchdown in the second quarter, helping the Wildcats build an early 17-3 lead.

West Virginia struggled on offense, particularly after starting quarterback Garrett Greene left the game due to injury in the second quarter. Before his departure, Greene threw a touchdown pass to Hudson Clement and cut Kansas State’s lead to 17-10. However, the Mountaineers were unable to keep pace in the second half, and backup quarterback Nicco Marciol managed only one late touchdown in relief.

Kansas State’s defense limited West Virginia to 143 passing yards and forced two interceptions. One interception was returned for a touchdown.

Kansas State’s DJ Giddens sealed the win with a 1-yard touchdown run, following up on a 53-yard catch that set up another Wildcats score earlier in the game. With the win, Kansas State improved to 6-1 overall and 3-1 in Big 12 play, keeping pace with the conference leaders. The Wildcats will face in-state rival Kansas in their next matchup.

=== vs Kansas (Sunflower Showdown) ===
Kansas Jayhawks (2–5) vs No. 16 Kansas State Wildcats (6–1) – Game summary

Quarter	1	2	3	4	Total
Jayhawks	7	7	13	0	27
No. 16 Wildcats	0	16	7	6	29

at Bill Snyder Family Stadium • Manhattan, KS

- Date: October 26, 2024
- Game time: 7:00 p.m.
- Game weather: Clear • Temperature: 63 °F (17 °C) • Wind: E 7 miles per hour (11 km/h)
- Game attendance: 52,074
- Referee: Mike McCabe
- TV announcers (ESPN2): Roy Philpott (play-by-play), Sam Acho (analyst), and Taylor Davis (sideline)

Game information

First quarter

- (8:51) KAN – Sevion Morrison 38-yard run, Tabor Allen kick. (Drive: 11 plays, 75 yards, 6:09; Kansas 7–0)

Second quarter

- (11:09) KSU – Will Anciaux 24-yard pass from Avery Johnson, Chris Tennant kick. (Drive: 13 plays, 95 yards, 6:35; Tied 7–7)
- (11:02) KSU – Team Safety. (Drive: 1 play, 0 yards, 0:06; Kansas State 9–7)
- (7:13) KSU – Garrett Oakley 2-yard pass from Avery Johnson, Chris Tennant kick. (Drive: 8 plays, 59 yards, 3:43; Kansas State 16–7)
- (3:29) KAN – Luke Grimm 10-yard pass from Jalon Daniels, Tabor Allen kick. (Drive: 6 plays, 75 yards, 3:44; Kansas State 16–14)

Third quarter

- (13:15) KSU – Avery Johnson 10-yard run, Chris Tennant kick. (Drive: 4 plays, 75 yards, 1:45; Kansas State 23–14)
- (8:54) KAN – Devin Neal 24-yard run, Tabor Allen kick no good. (Drive: 9 plays, 65 yards, 4:21; Kansas State 23–20)
- (0:36) KAN – Jalon Daniels 8-yard run, Tabor Allen kick. (Drive: 3 plays, 54 yards, 1:31; Kansas 27–23)

Fourth quarter

- (13:23) KSU – Chris Tennant 28-yard field goal. (Drive: 7 plays, 66 yards, 2:13; Kansas 27–26)
- (1:42) KSU – Chris Tennant 51-yard field goal. (Drive: 7 plays, 15 yards, 2:02; Kansas State 29–27)

Statistics	KU	KSU
First downs	23	22
Total yards	401	479
Rushing yards	192	226
Passing yards	209	253
Passing: Comp–Att–Int	18-31-1	19-34-0
Time of possession	27:40	32:20

Team	Category	Player	Statistics
Kansas	Passing	Jalon Daniels	18-31, 209 Yds, 1 TD, 1 INT
Kansas	Rushing	Jalon Daniels	15 Att, 66 Yds, 1 TD
Kansas	Receiving	Trevor Wilson	4 Rec, 69 Yds, 0 TD
Kansas State	Passing	Avery Johnson	19-34, 253 Yds, 2 TD, 0 Int
Kansas State	Rushing	DJ Giddens	18 Att, 102 Yds, 0 TD
Kansas State	Receiving	Jayce Brown	5 Rec, 98 Yds, 0 TD

==== Preview ====
The 2024 edition of the Sunflower Showdown between Kansas State and Kansas will take place at Bill Snyder Family Stadium in Manhattan, Kansas, on October 26, 2024—scheduled for a primetime 7 p.m. kickoff and broadcast on ESPN2. Kansas holds the all-time series advantage at 65-51-5, but Kansas State has won the last 15 meetings dating back to 2009. Kansas has only managed one win in Manhattan since 1990.

Kansas State, ranked No. 17, enters the game with a 6-1 record and is tied for third place in the Big 12 standings. The Wildcats are coming off a decisive 45-18 win over West Virginia. Meanwhile, Kansas (2-5, 1-3 Big 12) snapped a five-game losing streak with a 42-14 victory over Houston in their last game.

Kansas State has dominated the rivalry in recent years, but the Jayhawks will be motivated to end their losing streak and secure a major win on the road.

==== Game summary ====
The Kansas State Wildcats extended their dominance in the Sunflower Showdown with a close 29-27 victory over the Kansas Jayhawks for their 16th consecutive win in the rivalry. The game featured back-and-forth action, with both teams seizing leads, only for Kansas State to ultimately pull ahead in the final moments.

Kansas struck first with a 38-yard touchdown run by Sevion Morris on their opening drive. Kansas State responded in the second quarter, with Avery Johnson connecting on a 24-yard touchdown pass to Will Anciaux. A subsequent safety and another touchdown pass gave K-State a 16-7 lead, only for Kansas to close the gap just before halftime, making it 16-14.

In the third quarter, K-State initially extending their lead to 23-14 on a 10-yard Johnson rushing touchdown. Kansas quickly answered with a 24-yard rushing touchdown by Devin Neal, though they missed the extra point, trailing 23-20. The Jayhawks later claimed a 27-23 lead on an 8-yard touchdown run by Jalon Daniels.

With under two minutes remaining, Kansas State took advantage of a fumble by Daniels to set up a 51-yard field goal from Chris Tennant, regaining the lead 29-27. Kansas had one final drive but fell short, securing the Wildcats' win.

=== at Houston ===
No. 17 Kansas State Wildcats (7–1) at Houston Cougars (3–5) – Game summary

Quarter	1	2	3	4	Total
No. 17 Wildcats	3	13	3	0	19
Cougars	0	10	0	14	24

at TDECU Stadium • Houston, TX

- Date: November 2, 2024
- Game time: 2:30 p.m.
- Game weather: Rain • Temperature: 79 °F (26 °C) • Wind: NW 10 miles per hour (16 km/h)
- Game attendance: 23,085
- Referee: Stephen Baron
- TV announcers (FOX): Jason Benetti (play-by-play), Brock Huard (analyst), and Allison Williams (sideline)

Game information

First quarter

- (8:12) KSU – Chris Tennant 23-yard field goal (Drive: 15 plays, 70 yards, 6:48; Kansas State 3–0)

Second quarter

- (14:56) HOU – Donovan Smith 1-yard run, Jack Martin kick (Drive: 5 plays, 53 yards, 2:16; Houston 7–3)
- (8:37) HOU – Jack Martin 22-yard field goal (Drive: 9 plays, 55 yards, 5:16; Houston 10–3)
- (1:48) KSU – DJ Giddens 2-yard run, Chris Tennant PAT failed (Drive: 14 plays, 71 yards, 6:40; Houston 10–9)
- (0:09) KSU – Keagan Johnson 7-yard pass from Avery Johnson, Chris Tennant kick (Drive: 5 plays, 48 yards, 0:29; Kansas State 16–10)

Third quarter

- (0:00) KSU – Chris Tennant 47-yard field goal (Drive: 5 plays, 55 yards, 1:50; Kansas State 19–10)

Fourth quarter

- (10:58) HOU – Maliq Carr 1-yard pass from Zeon Chriss, Jack Martin kick (Drive: 3 plays, 9 yards, 1:20; Kansas State 19–17)
- (2:31) HOU – Zeon Chriss 41-yard run, Jack Martin kick (Drive: 1 play, 56 yards, 0:12; Houston 24–19)

Statistics	KSU	HOU
First downs	21	10
Total yards	327	232
Rushing yards	89	121
Passing yards	238	111
Passing: Comp–Att–Int	23-41-2	12-12-0
Time of possession	31:01	28:59

Team	Category	Player	Statistics
Kansas State	Passing	Avery Johnson	23-39, 238 YDS, 1 TD, 2 INT
Kansas State	Rushing	DJ Giddens	17 ATT, 50 YDS, 1 TD
Kansas State	Receiving	Jayce Brown	3 REC, 86 YDS, 0 TD
Houston	Passing	Zeon Chriss	11-11, 103 YDS, 1 TD, 0 INT
Houston	Rushing	Zeon Chriss	22 ATT, 75 YDS, 1 TD
Houston	Receiving	Joseph Manjack IV	1 REC, 44 YDS, 0 TD

=== vs Arizona State ===
Arizona State Sun Devils (7–2) vs No. 16 Kansas State Wildcats (7–2) – Game summary

Quarter	1	2	3	4	Total
Sun Devils	7	14	3	0	24
No. 16 Wildcats	0	0	6	8	14

at Bill Snyder Family Stadium • Manhattan, KS

- Date: November 16, 2024
- Game time: 6:00 p.m.
- Game weather: 65 °F (18 °C)
- Game attendance: 51,880
- Referee: Tuta Salaam
- TV announcers (ESPN): Dave Flemming (play-by-play), Brock Osweiler (analyst), and Stormy Buonantony (sideline)

Game information

First quarter
Second quarter
Third quarter
Fourth quarter

Statistics	ASU	KSU
First downs	23	21
Total yards	398	412
Rushing yards	123	154
Passing yards	275	258
Passing: Comp–Att–Int	21-34-0	24-40-2
Time of possession	36:36	23:24

Team	Category	Player	Statistics
Arizona State	Passing	Sam Leavitt	21/34, 3 TD, 0 INT
Arizona State	Rushing	Cam Skattebo	25 CAR, 73 YDS, 0 TD
Arizona State	Receiving	Jordyn Tyson	12 REC, 176 YDS, 2 YD
Kansas State	Passing	Avery Johnson	24/40, 0 TD, 2 INT
Kansas State	Rushing	DJ Giddens	14 CAR, 133 YDS, 0 TD
Kansas State	Receiving	Dante Cephas	4 REC, 65 YDS, 0 TD

=== vs Cincinnati ===
Cincinnati Bearcats (5–5) vs Kansas State Wildcats (7–3) – Game summary

Quarter	1	2	3	4	Total
Bearcats	0	3	6	6	15
Wildcats	10	17	0	14	41

at Bill Snyder Family Stadium • Manhattan, KS

- Date: November 23, 2024
- Game time: 7:00 p.m.
- Game weather: 54 °F (12 °C), clear, Wind SE 4 miles per hour (6.4 km/h)
- Game attendance: 50,988
- Referee: Luke Richmond
- TV announcers (ESPN2): Brian Custer (play-by-play), Rod Gilmore (analyst), and Lauren Sisler (sideline reporter)

Game information

First quarter

- (11:25) KSU – Avery Johnson 21-yard run, Chris Tennant kick (Drive: 5 plays, 65 yards, 2:08; Kansas State 7–0)
- (3:37) KSU – Chris Tennant 28-yard field goal (Drive: 8 plays, 56 yards, 4:36; Kansas State 10–0)

Second quarter

- (13:37) KSU – Chris Tennant 32-yard field goal (Drive: 7 plays, 41 yards, 3:01; Kansas State 13–0)
- (7:01) KSU – DJ Giddens 32-yard run, Chris Tennant kick (Drive: 4 plays, 67 yards, 2:02; Kansas State 20–0)
- (4:17) CIN – Nathan Hawks 42-yard field goal (Drive: 7 plays, 52 yards, 2:05; Kansas State 20–3)
- (0:50) KSU – Tre Spivey 6-yard pass from Avery Johnson, Chris Tennant kick (Drive: 2 plays, 6 yards, 0:10; Kansas State 27–3)

Third quarter

- (4:54) CIN – Tony Johnson 9-yard pass from Brendan Sorsby (Drive: 11 plays, 80 yards, 5:40; Kansas State 27–9)

Fourth quarter

- (14:52) KSU – DJ Giddens 17-yard run, Chris Tennant kick (Drive: 11 plays, 73 yards, 4:56; Kansas State 34–9)
- (7:57) KSU – Will Swanson 8-yard pass from Avery Johnson, Chris Tennant kick (Drive: 8 plays, 50 yards, 4:20; Kansas State 41–9)
- (5:09) CIN – Tony Johnson 6-yard pass from Brendan Sorsby (Drive: 7 plays, 75 yards, 2:48; Kansas State 41–15)

Statistics	CIN	KSU
First downs	21	22
Total yards	374	428
Rushing yards	174	281
Passing yards	200	147
Passing: Comp–Att–Int	21-40-1	13-23-0
Time of possession	28:46	31:14

Team	Category	Player	Statistics
Cincinnati	Passing	Brendan Sorsby	21/39, 200 YDS, 2 TD, 1 INT
Cincinnati	Rushing	Corey Kiner	15 ATT, 140 YDS, 0 TD
Cincinnati	Receiving	Xzavier Henderson	4 REC, 60 YDS, O TD
Kansas State	Passing	Avery Johnson	13/23, 147 YDS, 2 TD, 0 INT
Kansas State	Rushing	DJ Giddens	15 ATT, 143 YDS, 2 TD
Kansas State	Receiving	Tre Spivey	5 REC, 63 YDS, 1 TD

=== at No. 18 Iowa State (rivalry) ===
No. 24 Kansas State Wildcats (8–3) at No. 18 Iowa State Cyclones (9–2) – Game summary

Quarter	1	2	3	4	Total
No. 24 Wildcats	7	7	7	0	21
No. 18 Cyclones	7	17	0	5	29

at Jack Trice Stadium • Ames, IA

- Date: November 30, 2024
- Game time: 6:30 pm
- Game weather: Cloudy, 24 °F (−4 °C), NW 5 mph
- Game attendance: 56,228
- Referee: Kevin Mar
- TV announcers (FOX): Connor Onion (play-by-play) and Mark Helfrich (analyst)

Game information

First quarter

- (12:24) ISU - Higgins, Jayden 15 yd pass from Becht, Rocco (Konrardy, Kyle kick) (Drive: 6 plays, 27 yards, 2:30; ISU 7–0)
- (5:39) KSU - Brown, Jayce 28 yd pass from Johnson, Avery (Tennant, Chris kick) (Drive: 10 plays, 83 yards, 4:43; Tied 7–7)

Second quarter

- (13:31) ISU - Konrardy, Kyle 41 yd field goal (Drive: 9 plays, 29 yards, 4:11; ISU 10–7)
- (10:05) ISU - Noel, Jaylin 9 yd pass from Becht, Rocco (Konrardy, Kyle kick) (Drive: 5 plays, 30 yards, 2:35; ISU 17–7)
- (5:49) KSU - Brown, Jayce 65 yd pass from Johnson, Avery (Tennant, Chris kick) (Drive: 1 play, 65 yards, 0:12; ISU 17–14)
- (0:43) ISU - Becht, Rocco 5 yd run (Konrardy, Kyle kick) (Drive: 6 plays, 78 yards, 1:04; ISU 24–14)

Third quarter

- (4:41) KSU - Oakley, Garrett 7 yd pass from Johnson, Avery (Tennant, Chris kick) (Drive: 5 plays, 59 yards, 2:15; ISU 24–21)

Fourth quarter

- (13:22) ISU - 0 yd safety (ISU 26–21)
- (6:16) ISU - Konrardy, Kyle 20 yd field goal (Drive: 14 plays, 60 yards, 7:00; ISU 29–21)

Statistics	KSU	ISU
First downs	14	22
Total yards	364	324
Rushing yards	144	187
Passing yards	220	137
Passing: Comp–Att–Int	12–29–0	13–36–0
Time of possession	24:35	35:25

Team	Category	Player	Statistics
Kansas State	Passing	Avery Johnson	12/28, 3 TD, 0 INT
Kansas State	Rushing	DJ Giddens	14 CAR, 72 YDS, 0 TD
Kansas State	Receiving	Jayce Brown	3 REC, 106 YDS, 2 TD
Iowa State	Passing	Rocco Becht	13/35, 2 TD, 0 INT
Iowa State	Rushing	Abu Sama	15 CAR, 81 YDS, 0 TD
Iowa State	Receiving	Jayden Higgins	3 REC, 53 YDS, 1 TD

=== vs Rutgers (Rate Bowl) ===
2024 Rate Bowl
Rutgers Scarlet Knights (7–5) vs Kansas State Wildcats (8–4) – Game summary

Quarter	1	2	3	4	Total
Scarlet Knights	7	20	7	7	41
Wildcats	3	14	12	15	44

at Chase Field • Phoenix, Arizona

- Date: Thursday, December 26, 2024
- Game time: 4:40 p.m. CST
- Game weather: Indoor
- Game attendance: 21,659
- Referee: Nate Black
- TV announcers (ESPN/ESPN Radio): Wes Durham (play-by-play), Tom Luginbill (analyst), and Dana Boyle (sideline)/Jorge Sedano (play-by-play) and Taylor McHargue (analyst)
- Box score

Game information

First Quarter

- (11:21) KSU – Chris Tennant 29 yard field goal (Drive: 9 plays, 69 yards, 3:02; Kansas State 3–0)
- (4:15) RUTG – Antwan Raymond 2 yard rush, Jai Patel kick (Drive: 13 plays, 75 yards, 7:06; Rutgers 7–3)

Second Quarter

- (14:56) KSU – Avery Johnson 2 yard rush, Chris Tennant kick (Drive: 9 plays, 75 yards, 4:19; Kansas State 10–7)
- (12:55) RUTG – Jai Patel 31 yard field goal (Drive: 6 plays, 62 yards, 2:01; Tied 10–10)
- (9:31) RUTG – Ja'shon Benjamin 3 yard rush, Jai Patel kick (Drive: 4 plays, 75 yards, 1:58; Rutgers 17–10)
- (6:44) KSU – Dylan Edwards 26 yard pass from Avery Johnson, Chris Tennant kick (Drive: 6 plays, 75 yards, 2:47; Tied 17–17)
- (4:45) RUTG – Antwan Raymond 24 yard rush, Jai Patel kick (Drive: 6 plays, 75 yards, 1:59; Rutgers 24–17)
- (1:04) RUTG – Jai Patel 48 yard field goal (Drive: 7 plays, 28 yards, 1:36; Rutgers 27–17)

Third Quarter

- (8:57) RUTG – Ja'shon Benjamin 7 yard pass from Athan Kaliakmanis, Jai Patel kick (Drive: 10 plays, 64 yards, 4:22; Rutgers 34–17)
- (5:45) KSU – Dylan Edwards 65 yard rush, two-point pass conversion failed (Drive: 1 plays, 65 yards, 0:11; Rutgers 34–23)
- (3:39) KSU – Garrett Oakley 13 yard pass from Avery Johnson, two-point pass conversion failed (Drive: 4 plays, 42 yards, 1:16; Rutgers 34–29)

Fourth Quarter

- (14:02) RUTG – Antwan Raymond 1 yard rush, Jai Patel kick (Drive: 5 plays, 18 yards, 2:03; Rutgers 41–29)
- (7:03) KSU – Joe Jackson 9 yard pass from Avery Johnson, Chris Tennant kick (Drive: 14 plays, 85 yards, 6:53; Rutgers 41–36)
- (4:15) KSU – Dylan Edwards 36 yard rush, Garrett Oakley pass from Avery Johnson for two-point conversion (Drive: 3 plays, 60 yards, 1:13; Kansas State 44–41)

Statistics	RUTG	KSU
First downs	18	23
Total yards	68–401	70–546
Rushing yards	36–164	40–351
Passing yards	237	195
Passing: Comp–Att–Int	14–32–1	15–30–1
Time of possession	28:55	29:05

Team	Category	Player	Statistics
Rutgers	Passing	Athan Kaliakmanis	14/32, 237 yards, 1 TD, 1 INT
Rutgers	Rushing	Antwan Raymond	18 carries, 113 yards, 3 TD
Rutgers	Receiving	Ian Strong	5 receptions, 105 yards
Kansas State	Passing	Avery Johnson	15/30, 195 yards, 3 TD, 1 INT
Kansas State	Rushing	Dylan Edwards	18 carries, 196 yards, 2 TD
Kansas State	Receiving	Jayce Brown	5 receptions, 60 yards

== Coaching staff ==
Name	Position	Year at Kansas State	Previous job
Chris Klieman	Head coach	6th	North Dakota State (HC)
Matt Wells	Co-OC/QB/AHC	1st	Oklahoma (Advisor to HC/O Analyst)
Van Malone	AHC/DPGC/CB	6th	Mississippi State (DA)
Joe Klanderman	DC/S	6th	North Dakota State (DB)
Conor Riley	Co-OC/OL	6th	North Dakota State (RGC/OL)
Brian Anderson	RB	6th	Illinois State (WR)
Brian Lepak	TE	4th	Southern (RGC/OL)
Matthew Middleton	WR	2nd	Kent State (WR/RC)
Steve Stanard	LB	5th	Syracuse (DE)
Mike Tuiasosopo	DT	6th	UTEP (DL)
Buddy Wyatt	DE	6th	Kansas (senior analyst)
Trumain Carroll	Strength/Cond.	4th	South Florida (S&C)
Nate Kaczor	STQC	1st	Washington Commanders (ST)
Matt Kardulis	DQC	4th	Virginia Tech (GA)
Drew Liddle	O Analyst	7th	UTEP (TE/FB)
Sean Maguire	O Analyst	1st	Buffalo (DA/QC)
David Orloff	D Analyst	4th	Syracuse (GA)

table source

== Radio ==
Flagship station	Play-by-play	Color commentator	Sideline reporter
KMAN AM 1350	Wyatt Thompson	Stan Weber	Matt Walters

== Rankings ==
Ranking movements Legend: ██ Increase in ranking ██ Decrease in ranking — = Not ranked RV = Received votes т = Tied with team above or below
	Week																
Poll	Pre	1	2	3	4	5	6	7	8	9	10	11	12	13	14	15	Final
AP	18	17	14	13	23	20	18т	17	16	17	22	20	RV	RV	RV	RV	RV
Coaches	17	16	15	14	25	20	19	17	16	15	21	19	25	RV	RV	RV	RV
CFP	Not released										19	16	—	24	—	—	Not released
