= Evan Pryor =

American football player (born 2002)

Florida Gators
- Position: Running back
- Class: Redshirt Senior

Personal information
- Born: November 6, 2002 (age 24)
- Listed height: 5 ft 9 in (1.75 m)
- Listed weight: 195 lb (88 kg)

Career information
- High school: William Amos Hough (Cornelius, North Carolina)
- College: Ohio State (2021–2023); Cincinnati (2024–2025); Florida (2026–present)
- Stats at ESPN

Evan Pryor (born November 6, 2002) is an American football running back for the Florida Gators. He previously played for the Ohio State Buckeyes and Cincinnati Bearcats.

== Early life ==
Pryor was born on November 6, 2002. He attended William Amos Hough High School where he had 4,233 all-purpose yards and 42 touchdowns. Rated as a four-star recruit, Pryor was the nation's No. 2-ranked all-purpose back when he officially committed to play college football at Ohio State University.

== College career ==
=== Ohio State ===
Pryor red-shirted his first year in 2021, playing in four games, where he rushed for 98 yards on 21 attempts and scored a rushing touchdown. Before the start of the 2022 season, he suffered a tear in his patellar tendon in practice and missed the entire year. Pryor returned in 2023, dressing in four games, rushing for 49 yards.

Pryor entered the transfer portal on December 3, 2023.

=== Cincinnati ===
Pryor committed to the University of Cincinnati on December 13, 2023. In 2024, he played in all 12 games, registering 418 rushing yards, 181 receiving yards and seven total touchdowns. Pryor had the second-highest yards per carry in the Big 12 and scored the longest play of the season for the Bearcats.

=== College statistics ===
Legend
**Bold**	Career high

Year	Team	Games		Rushing				Receiving			
Year	Team	GP	GS	Att	Yds	Avg	TD	Rec	Yds	Avg	TD
2021	Ohio State	4	0	21	98	4.7	1	2	8	4.0	0
2022	Ohio State	DNP									
2023	Ohio State	4	0	19	49	2.6	0	1	2	2.0	0
2024	Cincinnati	**12**	0	56	418	**7.5**	**6**	**15**	**181**	**12.1**	**1**
2025	Cincinnati	8	**8**	**66**	**478**	7.2	3	5	32	6.4	0
Career		28	8	162	1043	6.5	10	23	223	9.7	1
