= Joe Royer =

American football player (born 2002)

No. 18 – Cleveland Browns
- Position: Tight end
- Roster status: Non-football illness

Personal information
- Born: February 25, 2002 (age 24); Cincinnati, Ohio, U.S.
- Listed height: 6 ft 5 in (1.96 m)
- Listed weight: 250 lb (113 kg)

Career information
- High school: Elder (Cincinnati)
- College: Ohio State (2020–2023); Cincinnati (2024–2025)
- NFL draft: 2026: 5th round, 170th overall pick

Career history
- Cleveland Browns (2026–present)

Awards and highlights
- First-team All-Big 12 (2024); Third-team All-Big 12 (2025)
- Stats at Pro Football Reference

Joseph Royer (born February 25, 2002) is an American professional football tight end for the Cleveland Browns of the National Football League (NFL). He played college football for the Ohio State Buckeyes and Cincinnati Bearcats. He was selected by the Browns in the fifth round of the 2026 NFL draft.

== Early life ==
Royer attended Elder High School in Cincinnati, Ohio. He was rated as a three-star recruit and committed to play college football for the Ohio State Buckeyes over offers from schools such as Arizona State, LSU, Michigan, Penn State, and Wisconsin.

== College career ==
=== Ohio State ===
As a freshman in 2020, Royer was redshirted. In three years at Ohio State from 2021 to 2023, he appeared in 14 games for the Buckeyes where he recorded four receptions for 24 yards. After the 2023 season, Royer entered his name into the NCAA transfer portal.

=== Cincinnati ===
Royer transferred to play for the Cincinnati Bearcats. In the 2024 season opener, he recorded five receptions for 89 yards in a win over Towson. In week 4, Royer notched three receptions for 41 yards in a win over Houston.

=== Statistics ===
Season	Team	Games	Receiving				
Season	Team	Games	Rec	Yds	Avg	TD	Long
2021	Ohio State	5	1	9	9.0	0	9
2022	Ohio State	5	2	10	5.0	0	9
2023	Ohio State	4	1	5	5.0	0	5
2024	Cincinnati	12	50	521	10.4	3	38
2025	Cincinnati	12	29	416	14.3	4	73
Career		38	83	961	11.5	7	73

== Professional career ==
Pre-draft measurables
Height	Weight	Arm length	Hand span	Wingspan
6 ft 5 1/8 in (1.96 m)	247 lb (112 kg)	31 1/2 in (0.80 m)	10 3/4 in (0.27 m)	6 ft 6 3/4 in (2.00 m)
All values from NFL Combine

Royer was selected by the Cleveland Browns in the fifth round with the 170th overall pick of the 2026 NFL draft. He began the 2026 season on the non-football illness list after not reporting to training camp for personal reasons.
