= J. B. Dollison =

American politician

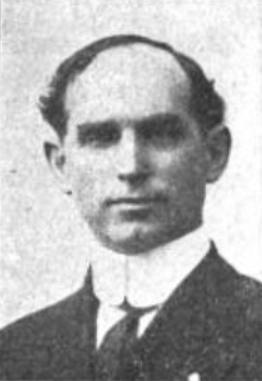
- Dollison, circa 1914

Member of the Ohio Senate from the Ninth-Fourteenth district
- In office 1912–1920

Personal details
- Born: January 11, 1869 Logan, Ohio, U.S.
- Died: March 7, 1949 Columbus, Ohio, U.S.
- Party: Democrat
- Spouse: Alberta Devore
- Children: 2
- Education: Logan High School; Zanesville Business College
- Occupation: Newspaper editor

John Bruce Dollison was a newspaper editor and politician from Logan, Ohio, United States.

== Biography ==
Dollison was born January 11, 1869, on a farm near Logan, Ohio. He graduated from Logan High School, and from Zanesville Business College.

Dollison obtained skills as a printer, and in 1893 became printer and editor of the Democrat-Sentinel in Logan. It was the only Democratic newspaper in Hocking County, and Dollison served as editor for over 20 years. In 1904, he married Alberta Devore, and they had a son and a daughter.

Dollison served as mayor of Logan "for several years". In 1912, Dollison was elected as a Democrat to the Ohio Senate, representing the Ninth-Fourteenth Senatorial District. Dollison served two terms in the senate, where his efforts were directed towards labor legislation, serving as Chairman of the Labor Committee.

Dollison died March 7, 1949, at his home in Columbus, Ohio, and was buried at Oak Grove Cemetery in Logan.
