= Logan High School (Ohio) =

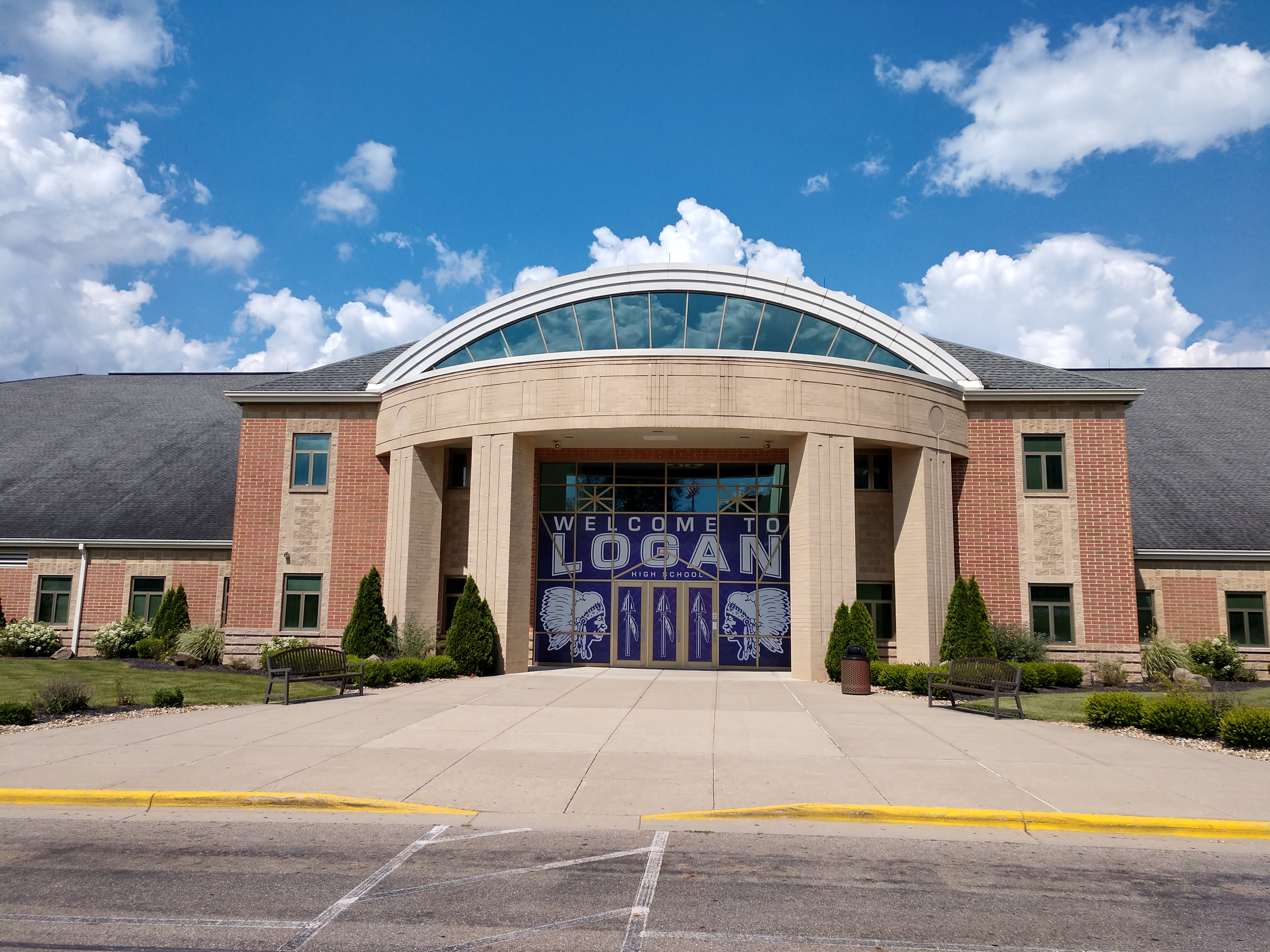

Location
- 14470 State Route 328; Logan, (Hocking County), Ohio 43138; United States
- Coordinates: 39°31′2″N 82°22′34″W

Information
- Type: Public high school
- School district: Logan-Hocking Local Schools
- Superintendent: Monte D. Bainter II
- Principal: Courtney Spatar
- Teaching staff: 67.00 (FTE)
- Grades: 9-12
- Student to teacher ratio: 14.93
- Colors: Purple and White
- Athletics conference: Ohio Capital Conference
- Mascot: Chieftain
- Team name: Chieftains
- Accreditation: North Central Association of Colleges and Schools
- Athletic Director: Howard Keith Myers
- Website: loganhocking.school

Logan High School is a public high school in Logan, Ohio, United States. It is the only high school in the Logan-Hocking School District.

== Athletics ==
The Logan Chieftains have been a member of the Southeastern Ohio Athletic League since 1925. The league will dissolve after the 2016–2017 school year. Logan's sports teams will be independent of a league starting in June 2017. It remained being independent until 2021, when it joined the Ohio Capital Conference. In 2025, it was announced the school would leave the OCC for the Mid-State League.

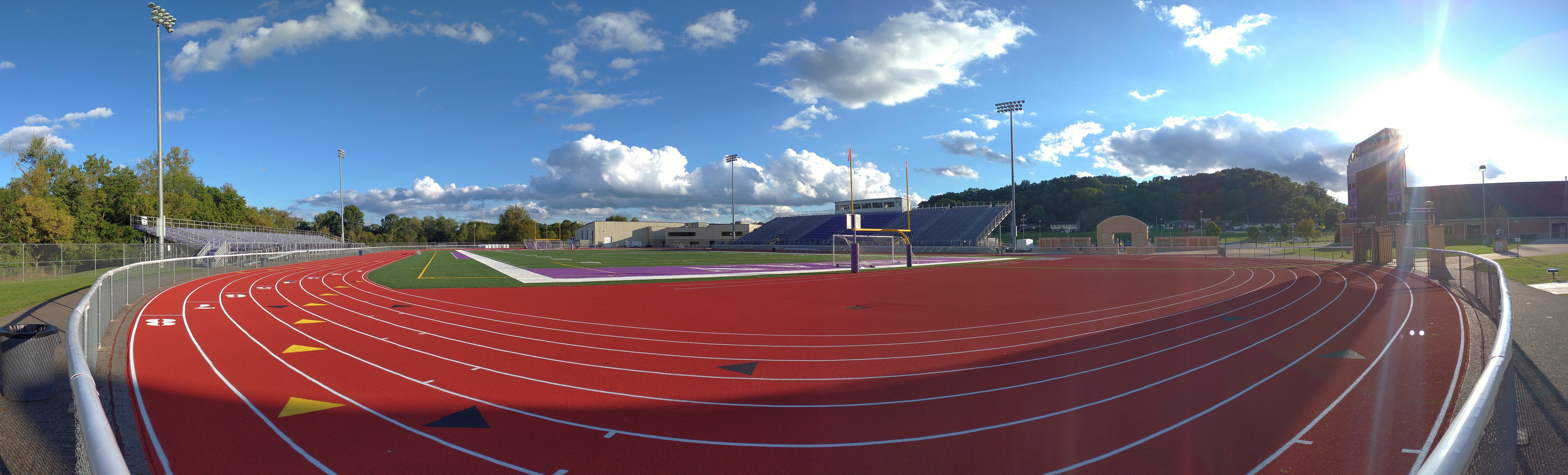
Sports field

== Notable alumni ==
- J. B. Dollison - newspaper editor and politician.
- Katie Smith - professional basketball player and coach.
- Tyson Veidt - college football coach.
