= Tyson Veidt =

American football player and coach (born 1973)

Current position
- Title: Linebackers coach
- Team: Penn State
- Conference: Big Ten

Playing career
- 1992–1996: Muskingum

Coaching career (HC unless noted)
- 1997–1998: Muskingum (GA)
- 1999: Indiana (GA)
- 2000–2003: Muskingum (DC)
- 2004–2005: West Virginia (GA)
- 2006–2007: Saint Vincent (DC)
- 2008–2013: Bluffton
- 2014–2015: Toledo (LB)
- 2016–2023: Iowa State (AHC/LB)
- 2024–2025: Cincinnati (DC)
- 2026–present: Penn State (LB)

Head coaching record
- Overall: 20–40

Tyson Veidt is an American college football coach and former player. He currently serves as the linebackers coach at Pennsylvania State University. Prior to this, he was the defensive coordinator at the University of Cincinnati. Veidt has also served as the head football coach at Bluffton University in Bluffton, Ohio from 2008 to 2013, compiling a record of 20–40. He was an assistant coach at the University of Toledo from 2014 to 2014 and Iowa State University from 2016 to 2023 under Matt Campbell.

== Playing career ==
A native of Logan, Ohio, Veidt graduated from Logan High School in 1992 and earned a bachelor's degree in pre-physical therapy from Muskingum College in 1996. Veidt was a two year starter and three year letter winner as well as graduating cum laude from Muskingum.

== Coaching career ==
=== Early coaching career ===
Veidt served as a graduate assistant at Indiana before returning to his alma mater to serve as defensive coordinator, he held this position from 2000 until 2003. He then worked under Rich Rodriguez at West Virginia as a defensive GA. He earned a master's degree in athletic coaching education at WVU in 2005. Veidt then coached two seasons at Saint Vincent College as defensive coordinator before accepting the head coaching position at Bluffton in 2008.

=== Bluffton ===
Veidt was named Bluffton's head football coach on January 3, 2008. He led the Beavers to 5-5 in 2011 and 6-4 in 2012, finishing 5-3 in the conference both seasons as well. The team broke 40 school records during his time. Veidt also won four straight wins over rival Defiance College.

His team excelled in the classroom as well. The Bluffton football team recorded the highest GPA in school history in 2012.

=== Toledo ===
Following his head coaching stint at Bluffton, Veidt coaching linebackers as well as serving as the recruiting coordinator at Toledo. At UT in 2014, he coaching first team All-MAC and future NFL linebacker Junior Sylvestre.

=== Iowa State ===
In January 2016 when Matt Campbell at Iowa State Veidt followed him to serve in as the assistant head coach in addition to coaching linebackers again. One of Veidt’s biggest accomplishments is transforming Joel Lanning into a First-Team All-American linebacker. Lanning, who hadn’t played linebacker since eighth grade, was a quarterback in his first four seasons as a Cyclone before switching over to linebacker in his final season. Veidt was a nominee for the Broyles Award and was named the Linebackers Coach of the Year by FootballScoop in 2017. He has coach two All-American Linebackers in Joel Lanning (2017) and Mike Rose (2020).

=== Cincinnati ===
In January 2024, Veidt was announced as the next defensive coordinator for Cincinnati under Scott Satterfield.

=== Penn State ===
In January 2026, Veidt took the linebackers' coach role at Penn State, reuniting once again with Matt Campbell.

== Head coaching record ==
Year	Team	Overall	Conference	Standing	Bowl/playoffs
Bluffton Beavers (Heartland Collegiate Athletic Conference) (2008–2013)
2008	Bluffton	1–9	0–7	8th	
2009	Bluffton	0–10	0–7	8th	
2010	Bluffton	4–6	3–5	6th	
2011	Bluffton	5–5	5–3	3rd	
2012	Bluffton	6–4	5–3	4th	
2013	Bluffton	4–6	4–4	5th	
Bluffton:		20–40	17–29		
Total:		20-40			
