= Jared Bartlett =

American football player (born 2001)

No. 45 – Jacksonville Jaguars
- Position: Linebacker
- Roster status: Injured reserve

Personal information
- Born: April 1, 2001 (age 25); Miami, Florida, U.S.
- Listed height: 6 ft 2 in (1.88 m)
- Listed weight: 237 lb (108 kg)

Career information
- High school: Collins Hill (Suwanee, Georgia)
- College: West Virginia (2019–2023); Cincinnati (2024)
- NFL draft: 2025: undrafted

Career history
- New York Jets (2025)*; Green Bay Packers (2025)*; Arizona Cardinals (2025); Carolina Panthers (2026)*; Jacksonville Jaguars (2026–present)
- * Offseason or practice squad member only

Awards and highlights
- Second-team All-Big 12 (2024)

Career NFL statistics as of 2025
- Games played: 2
- Stats at Pro Football Reference

Jared Bartlett (born April 1, 2001) is an American professional football linebacker for the Jacksonville Jaguars of the National Football League (NFL). He played college football for Cincinnati and West Virginia. He signed with the New York Jets as an undrafted free agent in 2025.

== Early life ==
Bartlett attended Collins Hill High School, where he played for head coach Lenny Gregory. Over two varsity seasons, he recorded 156 tackles (117 solo), 10 sacks, 23 tackles for loss, 13 quarterback hurries, and two fumble recoveries. He earned All-Region 6-7A honors twice and was named to the All-County first team as a senior after receiving honorable mention as a junior. Bartlett also competed in track and field. He is the brother of former Pittsburgh Steelers defensive lineman Stephon Tuitt.

== College career ==
=== West Virginia ===
Bartlett played in 50 games for West Virginia from 2019 to 2023, totaling 134 tackles and 21.0 tackles for loss. He was a two-time recipient of the Iron Mountaineer Award, presented to the program’s top offseason strength and conditioning performers (2022 and 2023). As a senior in 2023, he recorded 49 tackles, 6.0 tackles for loss, and 4.5 sacks, including a career-high seven tackles against Houston on October 12. In 2022, he earned Bronko Nagurski National Defensive Player of the Week honors following a three-sack performance against Virginia Tech.

=== Cincinnati ===
Bartlett transferred to Cincinnati for the 2024 season and became one of the Bearcats’ most productive defenders. He led the team in tackles (69), tackles for loss (11.5), and sacks (7.5), earning All-Big 12 honorable mention from conference coaches and Second-Team All-Big 12 honors from Phil Steele. He ranked second in the Big 12 in sacks and fourth in tackles for loss. Bartlett recorded a season-high ten tackles in the regular-season finale against TCU and delivered consistent production throughout the year, including seven tackles and a sack against West Virginia, five tackles and a 10-yard sack at Colorado, and six tackles with 1.5 sacks at UCF. He opened the season with six tackles and two tackles for loss against Towson.

== Professional career ==
Pre-draft measurables
Height	Weight	Arm length	Hand span	Wingspan	40-yard dash	10-yard split	20-yard split	20-yard shuttle	Three-cone drill	Vertical jump	Broad jump	Bench press
6 ft 1 3/4 in (1.87 m)	238 lb (108 kg)	33 1/4 in (0.84 m)	10 1/8 in (0.26 m)	6 ft 6 1/2 in (1.99 m)	4.65 s	1.60 s	2.70 s	4.41 s	7.07 s	32.0 in (0.81 m)	9 ft 7 in (2.92 m)	19 reps
All values from Pro Day

=== New York Jets ===
Bartlett signed with the New York Jets as an undrafted free agent on May 9, 2025. He was waived on July 24.

=== Green Bay Packers ===
On July 30, 2025, Bartlett signed with the Green Bay Packers. He was waived on August 26.

=== Arizona Cardinals ===
On September 2, 2025, the Arizona Cardinals signed Bartlett to their practice squad. Bartlett made his NFL debut on November 9, against the Seattle Seahawks. He was signed to the active roster on November 15, but was waived two days later. Bartlett was subsequently re-signed to the team's practice squad on November 19.

=== Carolina Panthers ===
On January 12, 2026, Bartlett signed a reserve/future contract with the Carolina Panthers. He was waived by the Panthers on July 26.

=== Jacksonville Jaguars ===
On August 2, 2026, Bartlett signed with the Jacksonville Jaguars, but was waived/injured four days later.
