= Dontay Corleone =

American football player (born 2002)

No. 2 – Cincinnati Bearcats
- Position: Defensive tackle
- Class: Redshirt Senior

Personal information
- Born: August 7, 2002 (age 24); Cincinnati, Ohio, U.S.
- Listed height: 6 ft 0 in (1.83 m)
- Listed weight: 340 lb (154 kg)

Career information
- High school: Colerain (Cincinnati)
- College: Cincinnati (2021–2025)

Awards and highlights
- Third-team All-American (2022); First-team All-Big 12 (2024); First-team All-AAC (2022); 2× Second-team All-Big 12 (2023, 2025); Freshman All-American (2022)
- Stats at ESPN

Dontay Corleone (born August 7, 2002) is an American college football defensive tackle for the Cincinnati Bearcats. He is nicknamed "The Godfather" due to his surname.

== Early life ==
Corleone grew up in Cincinnati, Ohio, as one of four children to a single mother. He attended Colerain High School, where as a senior he was named a member of the All-Ohio first team. A three-star prospect, Corleone committed to play college football at the University of Cincinnati, his childhood team.

== College career ==
Corleone would redshirt in his first season with the Bearcats. In 2022, he would have a breakout season, emerging as Cincinnati's top lineman, recording 44 tackles and two forced fumbles. At the conclusion of the 2022 season Corleone was named to the All-AAC first team and was tabbed as a freshman All-American by several media outlets. Following the departure of coach Luke Fickell to Wisconsin, Corleone elected to stay at Cincinnati rather than enter the transfer portal, citing his loyalty to the program and love for the city of Cincinnati. Prior to the 2023 season he was named a preseason first team All-American by the Associated Press.

== Professional career ==
Pre-draft measurables
| Height | Weight | Arm length | Hand span | Wingspan |
|---|---|---|---|---|
| 6 ft 0 1/2 in (1.84 m) | 340 lb (154 kg) | 31 7/8 in (0.81 m) | 9 1/2 in (0.24 m) | 6 ft 5 1/2 in (1.97 m) |
All values from NFL Combine
