= Xzavier Henderson =

American football player (born 2002)

No. 8 – Cincinnati Bearcats
- Position: Wide receiver
- Class: Senior

Personal information
- Born: April 20, 2002 (age 24)
- Listed height: 6 ft 3 in (1.91 m)
- Listed weight: 204 lb (93 kg)

Career information
- High school: Christopher Columbus (Westchester, Florida)
- College: Florida (2020–2022); Cincinnati (2023–present)
- Stats at ESPN

Xzavier Henderson (born April 20, 2002) is an American college football wide receiver for the Cincinnati Bearcats. He previously played for the Florida Gators.

== Early life ==
Henderson attended Christopher Columbus High School in Westchester, Florida. He was rated as a four-star recruit and committed to play college football for the Florida Gators.

== College career ==
=== Florida ===
During Henderson's first two collegiate seasons in 2020 and 2021, he totaled 35 receptions for 425 yards and three touchdowns in 23 games. In week 9 of the 2022 season, he brought in five receptions for 110 yards versus the eventual national champions, Georgia. Henderson finished the 2022 season starting in 11 games for the Gators, where he hauled in 410 yards and two touchdowns. After the season, he entered his name into the NCAA transfer portal.

Henderson finished his three-year career with the Gators from 2020 through 2022, hauling in 73 receptions for 835 yards and five touchdowns as a Florida Gator.

=== Cincinnati ===
Henderson transferred to play for the Cincinnati Bearcats. In the 2023 season opener, he hauled in seven receptions for 149 yards and a touchdown in a win over Eastern Kentucky. In his first season with the Bearcats in 2023, Henderson hauled in 58 receptions for 782 yards and three touchdowns.

=== Statistics ===
Season	Team	Games	Receiving				
Season	Team	Games	Rec	Yds	Avg	TD	Long
2020	Florida	10	9	148	16.4	1	43
2021	Florida	13	26	277	10.7	2	35
2022	Florida	11	38	410	10.8	2	78
2023	Cincinnati	12	58	782	13.5	3	55
2024	Cincinnati	12	59	738	12.5	4	42
Career		58	190	2,355	12.4	12	78

== Professional career ==
Pre-draft measurables
Height	Weight	Arm length	Hand span	40-yard dash	20-yard shuttle	Three-cone drill	Vertical jump	Broad jump	Bench press
6 ft 3 1/8 in (1.91 m)	204 lb (93 kg)	33 3/8 in (0.85 m)	9 1/4 in (0.23 m)	4.70 s	4.25 s	6.96 s	34.5 in (0.88 m)	10 ft 6 in (3.20 m)	14 reps
All values from Pro Day
