= Corey Kiner =

American football player (born 2002)

No. 9 – New England Patriots
- Position: Running back
- Roster status: Active

Personal information
- Born: January 21, 2002 (age 24); Cincinnati, Ohio, U.S.
- Listed height: 5 ft 9 in (1.75 m)
- Listed weight: 209 lb (95 kg)

Career information
- High school: Roger Bacon (St. Bernard, Ohio)
- College: LSU (2021); Cincinnati (2022–2024)
- NFL draft: 2025: undrafted

Career history
- San Francisco 49ers (2025)*; Minnesota Vikings (2025); Arizona Cardinals (2025); New England Patriots (2026–present)
- * Offseason or practice squad member only

Career NFL statistics as of Week 1, 2026
- Games played: 5
- Rushing yards: 69
- Rushing average: 3.8
- Stats at Pro Football Reference

Corey Kiner (born January 21, 2002) is an American professional football running back for the New England Patriots of the National Football League (NFL). He played college football for the LSU Tigers and Cincinnati Bearcats.

== Early life ==
Kiner attended Roger Bacon High School in St. Bernard, Ohio. As a senior in 2020, he was named Ohio Mr. Football after rushing for 1,866 yards and 35 touchdowns. For his career, he had 7,130 rushing yards and 125 total touchdowns. Kiner committed to Louisiana State University (LSU) to play college football.

== College career ==
In his lone season at LSU in 2021, Kiner rushed for 324 yards on 79 carries with two touchdowns. After the season, he transferred to the University of Cincinnati. In his first season at Cincinnati in 2022, he played in 10 games and rushed 81 times for 362 yards and five touchdowns. Kiner became Cincinnati's starter in 2023, rushing for 1,047 on 192 carries with five touchdowns. He returned as Cincinnati's starter his senior year in 2024.

=== College statistics ===
Season	Team	GP	Rushing				Receiving			
Season	Team	GP	Att	Yds	Avg	TD	Rec	Yds	Avg	TD
2021	LSU	11	79	320	4.1	2	2	10	5.0	0
2022	Cincinnati	10	81	362	4.5	5	2	2	1.0	0
2023	Cincinnati	12	192	1,047	5.5	5	12	49	6.4	0
2024	Cincinnati	12	204	1,153	5.7	4	16	111	6.9	0
Career		45	556	2,882	5.2	16	32	172	5.4	0

== Professional career ==
Pre-draft measurables
Height	Weight	Arm length	Hand span	Wingspan	40-yard dash	10-yard split	20-yard split	20-yard shuttle	Bench press
5 ft 8 5/8 in (1.74 m)	209 lb (95 kg)	30 1/2 in (0.77 m)	7 3/4 in (0.20 m)	6 ft 3 1/2 in (1.92 m)	4.57 s	1.59 s	2.70 s	4.44 s	19 reps
All values from NFL Combine/Pro Day

=== San Francisco 49ers ===
Kiner signed with the San Francisco 49ers as an undrafted free agent on April 27, 2025. On August 20, Kiner was waived/injured by the 49ers due to an ankle injury.

=== Minnesota Vikings ===
On September 23, 2025, Kiner was signed to the Minnesota Vikings' practice squad.

=== Arizona Cardinals ===
On December 2, 2025, Kiner was signed by the Arizona Cardinals off the Vikings practice squad.

=== New England Patriots ===
On August 29, 2026, Kiner was traded to the New England Patriots in exchange for a 2028 seventh-round pick.

== NFL career statistics ==
Year	Team	Games		Rushing					Receiving					Fumbles	
Year	Team	GP	GS	Att	Yds	Avg	Lng	TD	Rec	Yds	Avg	Lng	TD	Fum	Lost
2025	MIN	0	0	DNP											
2025	ARI	4	0	12	58	4.8	9	0	2	15	7.5	11	0	0	0
2026	NE	1	0	6	11	1.8	7	0	0	0	0.0	11	0	1	1
Career		5	0	18	69	3.8	9	0	2	15	7.5	11	0	1	1
