= 2017 BYU Cougars football team =

American college football season

2017 BYU Cougars football
- Conference: Independent
- Record: 4–9
- Head coach: Kalani Sitake (2nd season)
- Offensive coordinator: Ty Detmer (2nd season)
- Offensive scheme: Pro-style
- Defensive coordinator: Ilaisa Tuiaki (2nd season)
- Base defense: 4–3
- Captains: Tanner Mangum; Tejan Koroma; Fred Warner; Butch Pau'u
- Home stadium: LaVell Edwards Stadium

2017 NCAA Division I FBS independents football records
	Conf.			Overall
Team	W		L	W		L
Army		–		10	–	3
No. 11 Notre Dame		–		10	–	3
UMass		–		4	–	8
BYU		–		4	–	9
Rankings from AP Poll

The 2017 BYU Cougars football team represented Brigham Young University in the 2017 NCAA Division I FBS football season. The Cougars were led by second-year head coach Kalani Sitake and played their home games at LaVell Edwards Stadium. This was the seventh year BYU competed as an NCAA Division I FBS independent. BYU had 13 regular season games scheduled in the season, due to their finale game at Hawaii, which NCAA rules allow them to schedule one extra home game. They finished the season 4–9.

== Before the season ==
=== 2017 recruits ===
Name	Pos.	Height	Weight	Hometown	Notes
Langi Tuifua	DL	6'4"	230	South Jordan, Utah	
Chaz Ah You	LB	6'2"	199	Eagle Mountain, Utah	
Bentley Hanshaw	TE	6'6"	225	Moorpark, California	
Keenan Ellis	DB	6'1"	170	Chula Vista, California	
Alden Tofa	DL	6'4"	260	West Jordan, Utah	
Seleti Fevaleaki	DL	6'3"	290	Corona, California	Mission prior to enrolling
Donovan Hanna	TE	6'5"	230	Queen Creek, Arizona	Mission prior to enrolling
Tyler Batty	DL	6'5"	235	Payson, Utah	Mission prior to enrolling
Ammon Hannemann	DB	6'2"	190	Highland, Utah	Mission prior to enrolling
Ryan Rehkow	P	6'5"	205	Veradale, Washington	Mission prior to enrolling
Isaac Rex	TE	6'5"	235	San Clemente, California	Mission prior to enrolling
Lorenzo Fauatea	DL	6'4"	260	West Valley, Utah	
Preston Lewis	LB	6'2"	225	Alpine, Utah	Mission prior to enrolling
Tongi Langi	DB	6'1"	180	South Jordan, Utah	Mission prior to enrolling
Ben Bywater	LB	6'3"	210	Salt Lake City, Utah	Mission prior to enrolling
Jackson McChesney	RB	6'0"	187	Highland, Utah	Mission prior to enrolling
Mason Fakahua	QB	6'3"	210	Cedar City, Utah	Mission prior to enrolling
Tariq Buchanan	WR	6'1"	175	Elgin, Texas	
Seth Willis	OL	6'6"	325	Sandy Hook, Connecticut	Mission prior to enrolling
Tanner Baker	DL	6'5"	255	Acworth, Georgia	
Chayce Bolli	WR	6'0"	190	Boerne, Texas	

=== 2017 returned missionaries ===
Name	Pos.	Height	Weight	Year	Notes
Garrett England	LB	6'4"	210	Freshman	
Earl Tuioti-Mariner	DL	6'4"	260	Freshman	
Matt Bushman	TE	6'5"	230	Freshman	
Neil Pau'u	TE	6'4"	205	Freshman	
Brady Christensen	OL	6'6"	240	Freshman	
Tommy Nelson	DB	6'2"	190	Freshman	
Motekiai Langi	DL	6'7"	410	Freshman	
Will Sedgwick	LB	6'2"	230	Freshman	
Kody Wilstead	QB	6'6"	222	Freshman	
Jared Kapisi	WR	6'1"	185	Freshman	
Bracken El-Bakri	RB	6'3"	261	Freshman	

=== 2017 other additions ===
Name	Pos.	Height	Weight	Year	Notes
A.J. Lolohea	DL	6'3"	240	Freshman	Transfer from Weber State University
Ula Tolutau	RB	6'1"	255	Freshman	Transfer from University of Wisconsin
Joe Tukuafu	TE	6'4"	280	Freshman	Transfer from Utah State University
Joe Critchlow	QB	6'4"	210	Freshman	Transfer from Southern Utah University
Khyiris Tonga	DL	6'4"	300	Freshman	Transfer from University of Utah
James Empey	OL	6'4"	270	Freshman	Transfer from University of Utah
Lopini Katoa	RB	6'0"	200	Freshman	Transfer from Oregon State University
Nate Heaps	TE	6'4"	245	Freshman	Transfer from Weber State University
Austin Whetzel	DB	6'0"	175	Sophomore	Transfer from Weber State University
Christian Folau	LB	6'1"	240	Freshman	Transfer from Oregon State University
Taipe Vaka	OL	6'5"	275	Junior	Transfer from Diablo Valley College
Wayne Tei-Kirby	DL	6'3"	305	Sophomore	Transfer from University of Oregon
Keanu Saleapaga	DL	6'6"	290	Freshman	Originally Signed 2016
Sione Takitaki	DL	6'2"	245	Junior	Return after sitting out 2016
Marvin Hifo	DB	5'10"	195	Senior	Transfer from Mt. San Jacinto College
Austin Lee	DB	6'0"	202	Sophomore	Transfer from University of Utah
Trevion Greene	DB	6'4"	190	Sophomore	Transfer from Chabot College
Austin Kafentzis	RB	6'1"	195	Sophomore	Transfer from Arizona Western College
Tristen Hoge	OL	6'4"	303	Sophomore	Transfer from University of Notre Dame

=== 2017 departures ===
Name	Pos.	Height	Weight	Year	Notes
Chris Badger	DB	6'0"	200	Senior	Graduation
Algie Brown	RB	6'1"	250	Senior	Graduation, signed free agent deal with the Seattle Seahawks
Michael Davis	DB	6'2"	196	Senior	Graduation, signed free agent deal with the Los Angeles Chargers
Parker Dawe	OL	6'3"	307	Senior	Graduation
Andrew Eide	OL	6'5"	301	Senior	Graduation
Austin Heder	LB	6'2"	240	Senior	Graduation
Taysom Hill	QB	6'2"	235	Senior	Graduation, signed free agent deal with the Green Bay Packers
Kyle Johnson	OL	6'4"	319	Senior	Graduation
Garrett Juergens	WR	5'10"	184	Senior	Graduation
Mitchell Juergens	WR	5'10"	181	Senior	Graduation
Nick Kurtz	WR	6'6"	215	Senior	Graduation
Harvey Langi	LB	6'3"	252	Senior	Graduation, signed free agent deal with the New England Patriots
Maurice Maxwell	DL	6'4"	260	Senior	Graduation
Kai Nacua	DB	6'2"	215	Senior	Graduation, signed free agent deal with the Cleveland Browns
Colby Pearson	WR	6'0"	203	Senior	Graduation, signed free agent deal with the Green Bay Packers
Logan Taele	DL	6'2"	295	Senior	Graduation
Eric Takenaka	DB	5'10"	210	Senior	Graduation
Sae Tautu	DL	6'4"	245	Senior	Graduation, signed free agent deal with the New Orleans Saints
Travis Tuiloma	DL	6'2"	301	Senior	Graduation
Jamaal Williams	RB	6'2"	215	Senior	Graduation, drafted by the Green Bay Packers in the 2017 NFL draft
Hayden Livingston	QB	6'1"	185	Freshman	LDS mission
Keenan Pili	LB	6'2"	215	Freshman	LDS mission
Jake Oldroyd	K	6'1"	170	Freshman	LDS mission
Alema Pilimai	TE	6'4"	220	Freshman	LDS mission
Britton Hogan	DS	6'3"	220	Freshman	LDS mission
Quin Ficklin	OL	6'3"	280	Sophomore	Transfer to Utah State University
Trevor Brent	DB	5'10"	185	Freshman	Medical
Troy Hinds	TE	6'5"	245	Sophomore	Medical
Zac Dawe	OL	6'4"	280	Freshman	Medical
Ului Lapuaho	OL	6'7"	335	Sophomore	Medical
Mack Richards	WR	6'1"	190	Freshman	Medical
Scott Huntsman	LB	6'4"	230	Sophomore	Medical
Sam Baldwin	DB	6'3"	195	Freshman	Medical
David Weekes	TE	6'5"	220	Sophomore	
Colby Hansen	RB	5'11"	195	Junior	
Sam Morell	LB	6'1"	223	Freshman	
Lene Lesatele	DL	6'2"	245	Junior	
Tomasi Laulile	DL	6'4"	285	Junior	
Moses Kaumatule	DL	6'2"	275	Junior	
Caden Dortch	DB	6'0"	190	Freshman	

== During the season ==
=== 2017 departures ===
Name	Pos.	Height	Weight	Year	Notes
Marvin Hifo	DB	5'10"	195	Senior	
Francis Bernard	LB	6'1"	240	Senior	Transfer to University of Utah

== Media ==
=== Nu Skin BYU Sports Network Affiliates ===
- Broadcasters: Greg Wrubell, Marc Lyons, & Nate Meikle
- BYU Radio – Flagship Station Nationwide (Dish Network 980, Sirius XM 143, TuneIn radio, and byuradio.org)
- KSL 102.7 FM and 1160 AM – (Salt Lake City/ Provo, Utah and ksl.com)
- KIDO – Boise, Idaho (football only)
- KTHK – Blackfoot/ Idaho Falls/ Pocatello/ Rexburg, Idaho
- KSUB – Cedar City, Utah
- KMGR – Manti, Utah
- KDXU – St. George, Utah
- KSHP – Las Vegas, Nevada (football only)
- TuneIn – Nu Skin BYU Sports Network

== Roster ==
2017 BYU Cougars football team roster
Players
Coaches
Offense

Pos.	#	Name	Class
QB	11	Joe Critchlow	Fr
QB	10	Koy Detmer Jr.	So
QB	7	Beau Hoge (injured)	So
QB	12	Tanner Mangum (injured) (C)	Jr
QB	18	Kody Wilstead	Fr
OL	58	Austin Chambers	Fr
OL	67	Brady Christensen	Fr
OL	66	James Empey	Fr
OL	77	Chandon Herring	Fr
OL	69	Tristen Hoge	So
OL	71	Austin Hoyt	Jr
OL	70	Jacob Jimenez (injured)	Jr
OL	78	Tuni Kanuch	Sr
OL	56	Tejan Koroma (C)	Sr
OL	74	Kieffer Longson	Fr
OL	76	Keyan Norman	Sr
OL	65	JJ Nwigwe	Jr
OL	72	Addison Pulsipher	So
OL	59	Thomas Shoaf	So
OL	57	LeRoy Sitake-Tanoai	So
OL	50	Taipe Vaka	Jr
RB	34	Riley Burt	So
RB	22	Squally Canada	Jr
RB	4	Trey Dye (injured)	Jr
RB	48	Bracken El-Bakri	So
RB	35	Brayden El-Bakri	Jr
RB	44	Kavika Fonua (injured)	Jr
RB	43	Kyle Griffitts	So
RB	24	KJ Hall	So
RB	2	Austin Kafentzis	So
RB	32	Zachary Katoa	Fr
RB	36	Creed Richardson	Sr
RB	5	Ula Tolutau (S)	Fr
TE	88	Tanner Balderree	Sr
TE	89	Matt Bushman	Fr
TE	86	Bentley Hanshaw	Fr
TE	80	Nate Heaps	Fr
TE	17	Moroni Laulu-Pututau (injured)	Jr
TE	87	Hunter Marshall (injured)	Jr
TE	85	Nate Sampson	Jr
TE	87	Joe Tukuafu	Fr
WR	27	Chayce Bolli	Fr
WR	82	Tariq Buchanan	Fr
WR	1	Akile Davis	So
WR	15	Aleva Hifo	So
WR	87	Jared Kapisi	Fr
WR	80	Taggart Krueger	Jr
WR	83	Inoke Lotulelei	So
WR	84	Neil Pau'u	Fr
WR	20	Rickey Shumway	So
WR	21	Talon Shumway	So
WR	13	Micah Simon	So
WR	33	Beau Tanner	Jr
WR	7	Jonah Trinnaman	Sr

Defense

Pos.	#	Name	Class
DB	23	Zayne Anderson	Jr
DB	3	Isaiah Armstrong	Jr
DB	30	Keenan Ellis	Fr
DB	17	Gavin Fowler	Jr
DB	5	Dayan Ghanwoloku	So
DB	10	Kamel Greene	Sr
DB	12	Trevion Greene	So
DB	7	Micah Hannemann	Sr
DB	25	Tanner Jacobson	Jr
DB	11	Austin Lee	So
DB	22	Hiva Lee	Sr
DB	27	Austin McChesney (injured)	So
DB	24	Tommy Nelson	Fr
DB	28	Sawyer Powell (injured)	Sr
DB	18	Michael Shelton	Jr
DB	29	Cody Stewart	Sr
DB	28	Young Tanner	Jr
DB	1	Troy Warner (injured)	So
DB	27	Austin Whetzel	So
DB	32	Chris Wilcox	So
DL	56	Tanner Baker (injured)	Fr
DL	55	Lorenzo Fauatea (injured)	Fr
DL	93	Kainoa Fuiava	Fr
DL	68	Kamalani Kaluhiokalani	Jr
DL	90	Corbin Kaufusi	Jr
DL	60	Motekiai Langi (injured)	Fr
DL	58	Uriah Leiataua	Fr
DL	91	A.J. Lolohea	Fr
DL	61	David Low	So
DL	50	Tevita Mo'unga (injured)	Jr
DL	52	Trajan Pili	So
DL	97	Keanu Saleapaga	Fr
DL	46	Rhett Sandlin	Jr
DL	97	Cody Savage	Jr
DL	16	Sione Takitaki	Jr
DL	54	Merrill Taliauli	Jr
DL	92	Handsome Tanielu	Sr
DL	94	Kesni Tausinga	Sr
DL	75	Wayne Tei-Kirby	So
DL	59	Alden Tofa	Fr
DL	95	Khyiris Tonga	Fr
DL	49	Langi Tuifua	Fr
DL	91	Earl Tuioti-Mariner	Fr
DL	99	Solomone Wolfgramm	Jr
LB	19	Chaz Ah You	Fr
LB	39	Phillip Amone (injured)	Jr
LB	47	Garrett England	Fr
LB	31	Christian Folau	Fr
LB	43	Rylee Gautavai	So
LB	2	Matt Hadley (injured)	Sr
LB	37	Grant Jones (injured)	Sr
LB	53	Isaiah Kaufusi	Fr
LB	45	Va'a Nuimatalolo	Sr
LB	38	Butch Pau'u (C)	Jr
LB	44	Riggs Powell	Jr
LB	41	Adam Pulsipher	Jr
LB	34	Will Sedgwick	Fr
LB	42	Johnny Tapusoa	So
LB	51	Morgan Unga	Jr
LB	4	Fred Warner (C)	Sr

Special teams

Pos.	#	Name	Class
DS	64	Matt Foley	Jr
DS	98	Mitch Harris	So
K	26	Rhett Almond	Jr
K/P	30	Corey Edwards	Sr
K	83	Andrew Mikkelsen	Jr
P	31	Jonny Linehan	Sr

Head coach

- Kalani Sitake (BYU)

Coordinators/assistant coaches

- Ed Lamb (BYU)
  Assistant head coach, safeties, special teams
- Ty Detmer (BYU)
  Offensive coordinator, quarterbacks
- Mike Empey (BYU)
  Offensive line
- Reno Mahe (BYU)
  Running backs
- Ben Cahoon (BYU)
  Wide receivers
- Steve Clark (BYU)
  Tight ends
- Ilaisa Tuiaki (Southern Utah)
  Defensive coordinator, defensive line
- Steve Kaufusi (BYU)
  Linebackers
- Jernaro Gilford (BYU)
  Cornerbacks
- Nu'u Tafisi (California)
  Strength and conditioning
- Justin McClure (Northern Colorado)
  Asst. strength and conditioning
- AJ Middleton (Redlands)
  Asst. strength and conditioning
- Russell Tialevea (BYU)
  Director of football operations
- Tevita Ofahengaue (BYU)
  Director of recruiting operations
- Jack Damuni (BYU)
  Director of player personnel
- Jasen Ah You (BYU)
  Director of athletic relations
- Sione Kinikini (Western Governors)
  Director of player development
- Dallas Reynolds (BYU)
  Offensive graduate assistant
- Jan Jorgensen (BYU)
  Defensive graduate assistant
- Vince Feula (BYU)
  Defensive graduate assistant
- Harvey Unga (BYU)
  Offensive graduate assistant

Legend

- (C) Team captain
- (S) Suspended
- (I) Ineligible
- Injured
- Redshirt

Roster

=== Depth chart ===
Defense

FS
Zayne Anderson
Austin Lee
Gavin Fowler

WLB	MLB	SLB
Adam Pulsipher	Butch Pau'u	Fred Warner
Isaiah Kaufusi	Johnny Tapusoa	Morgan Unga
Riggs Powell	Va'a Nuimatalolo	Chaz Ah You

SS
Micah Hannemann
Tanner Jacobson
Kamel Greene

CB
Chris Wilcox
Trevion Greene
Cody Stewart

DE	DT	DT	DE
Corbin Kaufusi	Kesni Tausinga	Handsome Tanielu	Sione Takitaki
Trajan Pili	Merrill Taliauli	Khyiris Tonga	Langi Tuifua
Uriah Leiataua	Solomone Wolfgramm	Kamalani Kaluhiokalani	Rhett Sandlin

CB
Dayan Ghanwoloku
Michael Shelton
Hiva Lee

Offense

X-Receiver
Jonah Trinnaman
Beau Tanner
Neil Pau'u

LT	LG	C	RG	RT
Thomas Shoaf	Keyan Norman	Tejan Koroma	Tuni Kanuch	Austin Hoyt
Chandon Herring	Austin Chambers	James Empey	Addison Pulsipher	Keiffer Longson
JJ Nwigwe	Leroy Sitake-Tanoai	Keyan Norman	Austin Hoyt	Brady Christensen

TE
Matt Bushman
Tanner Balderee
JJ Nwigwe

Z-Receiver
Talon Shumway
Micah Simon
Aleva Hifo

QB
Joe Critchlow
Kody Wilstead
Koy Detmer Jr.

Key reserves
WR Rickey Shumway
DB Young Tanner
WR Akile Davis
TE Nate Sampson
WR Taggart Krueger
RB Creed Richardson
KO Andrew Mikkelsen
KO Corey Edwards

RB
Squally Canada
KJ Hall
Austin Kafentzis

FB
Brayden El-Bakri
Bracken El-Bakri
Kyle Griffitts

Special teams
PK Rhett Almond
PK Andrew Mikkelsen
P Jonny Linehan
P Corey Edwards
KR Michael Shelton
KR Jonah Trinnaman
PR Michael Shelton
PR Tanner Jacobson
LS Mitch Harris
LS Matt Foley
H Gavin Fowler

== Schedule ==
Date	Time	Opponent	Site	TV	Result	Attendance
August 26	1:00 p.m.	Portland State	LaVell Edwards Stadium; Provo, UT	ESPN	W 20–6	55,427
September 2	7:30 p.m.	vs. No. 13 LSU	Mercedes-Benz Superdome; New Orleans, LA^{[a]} (Texas Kickoff)	ESPN	L 0–27	53,826
September 9	8:15 p.m.	Utah	LaVell Edwards Stadium; Provo, UT (Holy War & Beehive Boot)	ESPN2	L 13–19	63,470
September 16	1:30 p.m.	No. 10 Wisconsin	LaVell Edwards Stadium; Provo, UT	ABC	L 6–40	61,143
September 29	6:00 p.m.	at Utah State	Maverik Stadium; Logan, UT (Beehive Boot & The Old Wagon Wheel)	CBSSN	L 24–40	24,112
October 6	8:15 p.m.	Boise State^{†}	LaVell Edwards Stadium; Provo, UT	ESPN	L 7–24	59,753
October 14	10:00 a.m.	at Mississippi State	Davis Wade Stadium; Starkville, MS	SECN	L 10–35	54,866
October 21	5:00 p.m.	at East Carolina	Dowdy–Ficklen Stadium; Greenville, NC	CBSSN	L 17–33	38,835
October 28	1:00 p.m.	San Jose State	LaVell Edwards Stadium; Provo, UT	BYUtv/ESPN3	W 41–20	46,451
November 4	8:45 p.m.	at Fresno State	Bulldog Stadium; Fresno, CA	ESPN2	L 13–20	29,370
November 10	8:30 p.m.	at UNLV	Sam Boyd Stadium; Whitney, NV	ESPN2	W 31–21	19,811
November 18	1:00 p.m.	UMass	LaVell Edwards Stadium; Provo, UT	BYUtv/ESPN3	L 10–16	51,355
November 25	8:00 p.m.	at Hawaii	Aloha Stadium; Honolulu, HI	CBSSN	W 30–20	24,910
^{†}Homecoming; Rankings from AP Poll released prior to game; All times are in Mountain time

^{^[a]} The game between LSU and BYU was originally scheduled to take place at NRG Stadium in Houston. However, due to massive flooding caused by Hurricane Harvey in the Houston area, school and game officials decided to relocate the game to New Orleans.

== Game summaries ==
=== Portland State ===
Portland State at BYU

Team	1	2	3	4	Total
Vikings	0	6	0	0	6
• Cougars	7	7	0	6	20

- Date: August 26
- Location: LaVell Edwards Stadium
  Provo, Utah
- Game start: 1:05 p.m. MDT
- Elapsed time: 3:18
- Game attendance: 55,427
- Game weather: 94 °F (34 °C), Sunny
- Referee: Brandon Cruse • Umpire: Rick Podraza • Linesman: Bradfo Edwards • Line judge: Darren Deckard • Back judge: Quentin Givens • Field judge: Glenn Crowthe • Side judge: Tuta Salaam • Center judge: Darren Winkley
- TV announcers (ESPN/BYUtv): Mark Neely, Trevor Matich, Kris Budden (ESPN)
  Dave McCann, Blaine Fowler, Lauren Francom McClain (BYUtv)

Uniform combination: white helmet, blue jersey, white pants.

Scoring summary

Quarter	Time	Drive			Team	Scoring information	Score	
Quarter	Time	Plays	Yards	TOP	Team	Scoring information	PSU	BYU
1	2:01	4	64	1:19	BYU	Neil Pau'u 28-yard touchdown reception from Tanner Mangum, Rhett Almond kick good	0	7
2	7:57	8	66	3:25	BYU	Squally Canada 1-yard touchdown run, Rhett Almond kick good	0	14
2	1:54	17	87	5:57	PSU	Darnell Adams 4-yard touchdown reception from Jalani Eason, Noah Brosio kick failed- wide right	6	14
4	13:22	13	83	6:02	BYU	27-yard field goal by Rhett Almond	6	17
4	2:09	4	5	1:33	BYU	35-yard field goal by Rhett Almond	6	20
"TOP" = time of possession. For other American football terms, see Glossary of American football.							6	20

=== LSU ===
BYU vs. LSU

Team	1	2	3	4	Total
Cougars	0	0	0	0	0
• #13 Tigers	0	14	6	7	27

- Date: September 2
- Location: Mercedes-Benz Superdome
  New Orleans
- Game start: 8:40 p.m. CDT
- Elapsed time: 2:54
- Game attendance: 53,826
- Game weather: Indoors
- Referee: Stuart Mullins • Umpire: Johnnie Forte • Linesman: John Hoffmann • Line judge: Robert Zivkovic • Back judge: Robert Luklan • Field judge: Bill Dolbow • Side judge: George Liotus • Center judge: Jeff Tomlin
- TV announcers (ESPN/Westwood One): Bob Wischusen, Brock Huard, Allison Williams (ESPN)
  Ryan Radtke, Derek Rackley (Westwood One)

Key injury: TE Moroni Laulu-Pututau

Uniform combination: white helmet, royal blue jersey, white pants.

Scoring summary

Quarter	Time	Drive			Team	Scoring information	Score	
Quarter	Time	Plays	Yards	TOP	Team	Scoring information	BYU	LSU
2	14:22	13	66	7:13	LSU	Derrius Guice 4-yard touchdown run, Jack Gonsoulin kick good	0	7
2	11:53	5	65	2:17	LSU	Derrius Guice 1-yard touchdown run, Jack Gonsoulin kick good	0	14
3	8:00	9	80	4:08	LSU	23-yard field goal by Jack Gonsoulin	0	17
3	3:08	7	34	3:39	LSU	29-yard field goal by Jack Gonsoulin	0	20
4	8:12	2	12	0:35	LSU	Darrel Williams 1-yard touchdown run, Jack Gonsoulin kick good	0	27
"TOP" = time of possession. For other American football terms, see Glossary of American football.							0	27

=== Utah ===
Utah at BYU

Team	1	2	3	4	Total
• Utes	3	6	10	0	19
Cougars	0	0	6	7	13

- Date: September 9
- Location: LaVell Edwards Stadium
  Provo, Utah
- Game start: 8:15 p.m. MDT
- Elapsed time: 3:24
- Game attendance: 63,470
- Game weather: 72 °F (22 °C), Partly cloudy; night
- Referee: Mark Duddy • Umpire: Tim Schroeder • Linesman: Cravon Barrett • Line judge: Steve Kovac • Back judge: David Ross • Field judge: Kevin Kieser • Side judge: Shane Anderson • Center judge: Chris Wiggins
- TV announcers (ESPN2/BYUtv): Mike Patrick, Tommy Tuberville, Paul Carcaterra (ESPN)
  Dave McCann, Blaine Fowler, Lauren Francom McClain (BYUtv)
Sources:
- Key injury: Starting QB Tanner Mangum was knocked out with an ankle injury.

Uniform combination: white helmet, royal blue jersey, white pants.

Scoring summary

Quarter	Time	Drive			Team	Scoring information	Score	
Quarter	Time	Plays	Yards	TOP	Team	Scoring information	UTAH	BYU
1	6:22	4	6	1:44	UTAH	21-yard field goal by Matt Gay	3	0
2	6:02	9	73	3:34	UTAH	25-yard field goal by Matt Gay	6	0
2	0:00	14	53	4:06	UTAH	31-yard field goal by Matt Gay	9	0
3	12:49	3	23	0:46	UTAH	Tyler Huntley 5-yard touchdown run, Matt Gay kick good	16	0
1	7:08	5	22	1:35	BYU	Ula Tolutau 1-yard touchdown run, 2-point pass by Tanner Mangum incomplete	16	6
3	2:35	10	66	3:50	UTAH	38-yard field goal by Matt Gay	19	6
4	2:38	11	76	3:13	BYU	Trey Dye 7-yard touchdown reception from Tanner Mangum, Rhett Almond kick good	19	13
"TOP" = time of possession. For other American football terms, see Glossary of American football.							19	13

=== Wisconsin ===
Wisconsin at BYU

Team	1	2	3	4	Total
• #10 Badgers	10	14	7	9	40
Cougars	3	3	0	0	6

- Date: September 16
- Location: LaVell Edwards Stadium
  Provo, Utah
- Game start: 1:30 p.m. MDT
- Elapsed time: 2:59
- Game attendance: 61,143
- Game weather: 64 °F (18 °C), Fair
- Referee: Daniel Capron • Umpire: Tim Owens • Linesman: Joh Wiercinski • Line judge: Ron Tipton • Back judge: Kevi Schwarzel • Field judge: Raymond Daniel • Side judge: Bobby Sagers
- TV announcers (ABC/BYUtv): Mike Patrick, Tommy Tuberville, Paul Carcaterra (ESPN)
  Dave McCann, Blaine Fowler, Lauren Francom McClain (BYUtv)

Key injury: RB Trey Dye was injured.

Uniform combination: white helmet, white jersey, white pants.

Scoring summary

Quarter	Time	Drive			Team	Scoring information	Score	
Quarter	Time	Plays	Yards	TOP	Team	Scoring information	WIS	BYU
1	9:41	7	31	3:56	WIS	23-yard field goal by Rafael Gaglianone	3	0
1	2:47	14	61	6:54	BYU	31-yard field goal by Rhett Almond	3	3
1	0:00	6	75	2:47	WIS	Jonathan Taylor 1-yard touchdown run, Rafael Gaglianone kick good	10	3
2	7:55	9	68	5:17	WIS	Quintez Cephus 9-yard touchdown reception from Alex Hornibrook, Rafael Gaglianone kick good	17	3
2	0:25	10	83	4:40	WIS	Quintez Cephus 15-yard touchdown reception from Alex Hornibrook, Rafael Gaglianone kick good	24	3
2	0:00	5	60	0:25	BYU	32-yard field goal by Rhett Almond	24	6
3	2:59	7	78	4:24	WIS	A.J. Taylor 18-yard touchdown reception from Alex Hornibrook, Rafael Gaglianone kick good	31	6
4	7:00	10	34	6:34	WIS	Troy Fumagali 19-yard touchdown reception from Alex Hornibrook, Rafael Gaglianone kick good	38	6
4	6:41				WIS	Ball snapped into the end zone and knocked out of the endzone by BYU for a WIS safety.	40	6
"TOP" = time of possession. For other American football terms, see Glossary of American football.							40	6

=== Utah State ===
BYU at Utah State

Team	1	2	3	4	Total
Cougars	7	14	0	3	24
• Aggies	7	17	3	13	40

- Date: September 29
- Location: Maverik Stadium
  Logan, Utah
- Game start: 6:00 p.m. MDT
- Elapsed time: 3:35
- Game attendance: 24,112
- Game weather: 70 °F (21 °C), Sunny
- Referee: Mike Defee • Umpire: Rob Richardson • Linesman: Al Green • Line judge: Derek Anderson • Back judge: Terry Jones • Field judge: Joe Blubaugh • Side judge: Lo Van Pham • Center judge: Marvel July
- TV announcers (CBSSN): Carter Blackburn, Aaron Taylor, Jenny Dell
Sources:
- Key injury: Starting QB Beau Hoge was knocked out with a concussion.

Uniform combination: white helmet, royal blue jersey, white pants.

Scoring summary

Quarter	Time	Drive			Team	Scoring information	Score	
Quarter	Time	Plays	Yards	TOP	Team	Scoring information	BYU	USU
1	11:40	9	75	3:20	USU	Dax Raymond 32-yard touchdown reception from Kent Myers, Dominik Eberle kick good	0	7
1	9:18				BYU	Interception returned 46 yards for touchdown by Micah Hanneman, Rhett Almond kick good	7	7
2	14:51	8	68	3:04	BYU	Braden El-Bakri 26-yard touchdown reception from Beau Hoge, Rhett Almond kick good	14	7
2	13:30	3	55	0:53	BYU	Beau Tanner 40-yard touchdown reception from Beau Hoge, Rhett Almond kick good	21	7
2	11:02				USU	Interception returned 30 yards for touchdown by Jalen Davis, Rhett Almond kick good	21	14
2	1:11	2	43	0:23	USU	Ron'quavion Turner 36-yard touchdown reception from Kent Myers, Dominik Eberle kick good	21	21
2	0:03	4	9	0:30	USU	32-yard field goal by Dominik Eberle	21	24
3	12:56	4	-2	1:48	USU	40-yard field goal by Dominik Eberle	21	27
4	14:52	5	41	2:09	USU	Kent Myers 19-yard touchdown run, 2-point pass incomplete	21	33
4	12:28	6	41	2:20	BYU	37-yard field goal by Rhett Almond	24	33
4	3:00				USU	Interception returned 30 yards for touchdown by Jalen Davis, Dominik Eberle kick good	24	40
"TOP" = time of possession. For other American football terms, see Glossary of American football.							24	40

=== Boise State ===
Boise State at BYU

Team	1	2	3	4	Total
• Broncos	0	17	0	7	24
Cougars	7	0	0	0	7

- Date: October 6
- Location: LaVell Edwards Stadium
  Provo, Utah
- Game start: 8:15 p.m. MDT
- Elapsed time: 3:12
- Game attendance: 59,753
- Game weather: 50 °F (10 °C), Calm; night
- Referee: Kevin Hassell • Umpire: Apollo Martin • Linesman: Tim Crowley • Line judge: David Young • Back judge: Bobby Lynn • Field judge: Gabriel DeLeon • Side judge: Mark Graves • Center judge: Abram Anaya
- TV announcers (ESPN/BYUtv): Adam Amin, Dusty Dvoracek, Molly McGrath
  Dave McCann, Blaine Fowler, Lauren Francom McClain (BYUtv)

Uniform combination: white helmet, blue jersey, white pants.

Scoring summary

Quarter	Time	Drive			Team	Scoring information	Score	
Quarter	Time	Plays	Yards	TOP	Team	Scoring information	BSU	BYU
1	7:08	10	48	5:48	BYU	Ula Tolutau 3-yard touchdown run, Rhett Almond kick good	0	7
2	11:51	9	52	4:26	BSU	Alex Mattison 9-yard touchdown run, Haden Hoggarth kick good	7	7
2	3:49	5	19	1:56	BSU	20-yard field goal by Haden Hoggarth	10	7
2	0:36	7	74	1:27	BSU	Sean Modster 24-yard touchdown reception from Brett Rypien, Haden Hoggarth kick good	17	7
4	14:18	16	82	6:41	BSU	Alex Mattison 2-yard touchdown run, Haden Hoggarth kick good	24	7
"TOP" = time of possession. For other American football terms, see Glossary of American football.							24	7

=== Mississippi State ===
BYU at Mississippi State

Team	1	2	3	4	Total
Cougars	0	3	7	0	10
• Bulldogs	7	14	7	7	35

- Date: October 14
- Location: Davis Wade Stadium
  Starkville, Mississippi
- Game start: 11:00 CDT
- Elapsed time: 3:08
- Game attendance: 54,866
- Game weather: 78 °F (26 °C), Clear
- Referee: Dan Romeo • Umpire: Scott Teifer • Linesman: Andy Warner • Line judge: Darren Deckard • Back judge: Chris Alston • Field judge: Ed Vinzant • Side judge: Jim Murphy • Center judge: Ken Ray
- TV announcers (SECN): Dave Neal, Matt Stinchcomb, Dawn Davenport

Uniform combination: white helmet, white jersey, blue pants.

Scoring summary

Quarter	Time	Drive			Team	Scoring information	Score	
Quarter	Time	Plays	Yards	TOP	Team	Scoring information	BYU	MS
1	5:15	10	89	4:08	MS	Nick Fitzgerald 15-yard touchdown run, Jace Christmann kick good	0	7
2	7:07	8	74	3:01	MS	Donald Gray 9-yard touchdown reception from Nick Fitzgerald, Jace Christmann kick good	0	14
2	3:35	7	54	3:32	BYU	38-yard field goal by Rhett Almond	3	14
2	0:22	12	75	3:13	MS	Nick Fitzgerald 14-yard touchdown run, Jace Christmann kick good	3	21
3	12:00	7	75	3:00	MS	Jamal Couch 9-yard touchdown reception from Nick Fitzgerald, Jace Christmann kick good	3	28
3	0:44	1	42	0:21	BYU	Aleva Hifo 42-yard touchdown reception from Tanner Mangum, Rhett Almond kick good	10	28
4	7:20	12	70	6:35	MS	Aeris Williams 5-yard touchdown run, Jace Christmann kick good	10	35
"TOP" = time of possession. For other American football terms, see Glossary of American football.							10	35

=== ECU ===
BYU at ECU

Team	1	2	3	4	Total
Cougars	7	3	0	7	17
• Pirates	7	3	9	14	33

- Date: October 21
- Location: Dowdy–Ficklen Stadium
  Greenville, North Carolina
- Game start: 7:00 p.m. EDT
- Elapsed time: 3:28
- Game attendance: 38,835
- Game weather: 71 °F (22 °C), Partly Cloudy, Winds ESE 3 mph
- Referee: Eddy Shelton • Umpire: M. Fitzgerald • Linesman: Rick Smith • Line judge: Scott Reilly • Back judge: Terry White • Field judge: Nick Lave • Side judge: Richard Corona • Center judge: Mike Contreraz
- TV announcers (CBSSN): Dave Ryan, Corey Chavous, Melanie Collins

Uniform combination: white helmet, white jersey, blue pants.

Scoring summary

Quarter	Time	Drive			Team	Scoring information	Score	
Quarter	Time	Plays	Yards	TOP	Team	Scoring information	BYU	ECU
1	6:52	5	28	2:36	BYU	Micah Simon 12-yard touchdown reception from Tanner Mangum, Rhett Almond kick good	7	0
1	3:09	10	72	3:43	ECU	Thomas Sirk 1-yard touchdown run, Jake Verity kick good	7	7
2	10:35	14	73	4:59	ECU	42-yard field goal by Jake Verity	7	10
2	0:00	9	70	4:14	BYU	22-yard field goal by Rhett Almond	10	10
3	13:01	6	50	1:59	ECU	42-yard field goal by Jake Verity	10	13
3	6:17	10	50	4:16	ECU	32-yard field goal by Jake Verity	10	16
3	1:07	7	60	1:58	ECU	33-yard field goal by Jake Verity	10	19
4	13:47	3	67	1:05	ECU	Trevon Brown 26-yard touchdown reception from Gardner Minshew, Jake Verity kick good	10	26
4	6:25	2	12	0:51	ECU	Quay Johnson 9-yard touchdown reception from Gardner Minshew, Jake Verity kick good	10	33
4	3:48	8	73	2:37	BYU	Matt Bushman 12-yard touchdown reception from Tanner Mangum, Rhett Almond kick good	17	33
"TOP" = time of possession. For other American football terms, see Glossary of American football.							17	33

=== San Jose State ===
San Jose State at BYU

Team	1	2	3	4	Total
Spartans	3	3	0	14	20
• Cougars	14	10	7	10	41

- Date: October 28
- Location: LaVell Edwards Stadium
  Provo, Utah
- Game start: 1:05 p.m. MDT
- Elapsed time: 3:08
- Game attendance: 46,451
- Game weather: 57 °F (14 °C), Sunny
- Referee: Scott Campbell • Umpire: Mich Henderson • Linesman: Greg Downum • Line judge: Jay Bilbo • Back judge: Alvin Moore • Field judge: Robert Asel • Side judge: Dave Curschman • Center judge: Stacy Hardin
- TV announcers (BYUtv): Dave McCann, Blaine Fowler, Lauren Francom McClain
Sources:
- Key injury: Starting RB K.J. Hall was knocked out with an injury after rushing for over 100 yards in the first half. Hall was the first RB this season to rush for over 100 yds. The former starting RB, Ula Tolutau, was suspended after being charged with marijuana possession.

Uniform combination: white helmet, blue jersey, white pants, pink accents (in honor of breast cancer awareness month).

Scoring summary

Quarter	Time	Drive			Team	Scoring information	Score	
Quarter	Time	Plays	Yards	TOP	Team	Scoring information	SJ	BYU
1	10:43	5	85	1:56	BYU	Micah Simon 23-yard touchdown reception from Tanner Mangum, Rhett Almond kick good	0	7
1	9:34	2	10	1:03	BYU	Matt Bushman 11-yard touchdown reception from Tanner Mangum, Rhett Almond kick good	0	14
1	6:18	4	19	1:53	SJ	48-yard field goal by Bryce Crawford	3	14
2	10:45	14	72	5:08	SJ	25-yard field goal by Bryce Crawford	6	14
2	10:27	2	75	0:18	BYU	K.J. Hall 75-yard touchdown run, Rhett Almond kick good	6	21
2	5:09	6	29	2:15	BYU	36-yard field goal by Rhett Almond	6	24
3	5:30	11	95	4:22	BYU	Squally Canada 9-yard touchdown run, Rhett Almond kick good	6	31
4	14:52	4	46	0:57	BYU	Micah Simon 41-yard touchdown reception from Tanner Mangum, Rhett Almond kick good	6	38
4	12:12	5	14	2:09	BYU	30-yard field goal by Rhett Almond	6	41
4	7:24	12	75	4:48	SJ	Tre Walker 30-yard touchdown reception from Montel Aaron, Bryce Crawford kick good	13	41
4	0:42	11	80	3:22	SJ	Tre Hartley 9-yard touchdown reception from Montel Aaron, Bryce Crawford kick good	20	41
"TOP" = time of possession. For other American football terms, see Glossary of American football.							20	41

=== Fresno State ===
BYU at Fresno State

Team	1	2	3	4	Total
Cougars	0	6	7	0	13
• Bulldogs	10	0	3	7	20

- Date: November 4
- Location: Bulldog Stadium
  Fresno, California
- Game start: 7:51 p.m. PDT
- Elapsed time: 3:10
- Game attendance: 29,370
- Game weather: 65 °F (18 °C), Mostly Cloudy
- Referee: Reggie Smith • Umpire: Tab Slaughter • Linesman: Mike Moeller • Line judge: Mark Stewert • Back judge: Lyndon Nixon • Field judge: Rich Almeroth • Side judge: Tim Murray • Center judge: Dan Scanlan
- TV announcers (ESPN2): Roy Philpott, Tom Ramsey
Sources:
- Key injury: Starting QB Tanner Mangum was knocked out with a right Achilles injury. It is a season ending injury.

Uniform combination: white helmet, white jersey, blue pants.

Scoring summary

Quarter	Time	Drive			Team	Scoring information	Score	
Quarter	Time	Plays	Yards	TOP	Team	Scoring information	BYU	FS
1	8:16	10	48	5:21	FS	43-yard field goal by Jimmy Camacho	0	3
1	2:08	5	57	2:14	FS	Jordan Mims 2-yard touchdown run, Jimmy Camacho kick good	0	10
2	11:30	14	78	5:32	BYU	27-yard field goal by Rhett Almond	3	10
2	0:00	15	64	3:20	BYU	46-yard field goal by Rhett Almond	6	10
3	10:07	10	46	4:45	FS	42-yard field goal by Jimmy Camacho	6	13
3	4:28	11	75	5:32	BYU	Squally Canada 4-yard touchdown run, Rhett Almond kick good	13	13
4	12:40	14	88	6:42	FS	Jordan Mimns 2-yard touchdown run, Jimmy Camacho kick good	13	20
"TOP" = time of possession. For other American football terms, see Glossary of American football.							13	20

=== UNLV ===
BYU at UNLV

Team	1	2	3	4	Total
• Cougars	0	14	14	3	31
Rebels	0	7	7	7	21

- Date: November 10
- Location: Sam Boyd Stadium
  Las Vegas
- Game start: 7:30 p.m. PST
- Elapsed time: 3:18
- Game attendance: 19,811
- Game weather: 67 °F (19 °C), Clear and Breezy
- Referee: Scott Campbell • Umpire: Joel Bellinger • Linesman: Doug Moore • Line judge: Keith Garmond • Back judge: Joel Wetzel • Field judge: Randy Smith • Side judge: Corey Luxner • Center judge: Mike Cuttone
- TV announcers (ESPN2): Adam Amin, Dusty Dvoracek, Molly McGrath

Uniform combination: white helmet, white jersey, blue pants.

Scoring summary

Quarter	Time	Drive			Team	Scoring information	Score	
Quarter	Time	Plays	Yards	TOP	Team	Scoring information	BYU	UNLV
2	9:06	7	80	3:21	BYU	Braden El-Bakiri 1-yard touchdown run, Rhett Almond kick good	7	0
2	4:25	9	79	4:41	UNLV	Lexington Thomas 1-yard touchdown run, Evan Pantels kick good	7	7
2	0:27	11	74	3:53	BYU	Aleva Hifo 2-yard touchdown reception from Joe Critchlow, Rhett Almond kick good	14	7
3	13:04	4	68	1:49	BYU	Squally Canada 2-yard touchdown run, Rhett Almond kick good	21	7
3	4:23	8	73	3:43	UNLV	Brando Presley 18-yard touchdown reception from Johnny Stanton, Evan Pantels kick good	21	14
3	1:40	6	75	2:43	BYU	Austin Kafentzis 11-yard touchdown run, Rhett Almond kick good	28	14
4	10:46	8	93	2:34	UNLV	Devonte Boyd 13-yard touchdown reception from Johnny Stanton, Evan Pantels kick good	28	21
4	5:39	10	45	4:59	BYU	28-yard field goal by Rhett Almond	31	21
"TOP" = time of possession. For other American football terms, see Glossary of American football.							31	21

=== UMass ===
UMass at BYU

Team	1	2	3	4	Total
• Minutemen	0	3	13	0	16
Cougars	0	0	3	7	10

- Date: November 18
- Location: LaVell Edwards Stadium
  Provo, Utah
- Game start: 1:05 p.m. MST
- Elapsed time: 3:06
- Game attendance: 51,355
- Game weather: 42 °F (6 °C), Clear and Breezy
- Referee: Michael Roche • Umpire: Hilbert Byers • Linesman: Todd Riddick • Line judge: Lance Thompson • Back judge: Byron Adams • Field judge: Ben Vasconcells • Side judge: Ryan Robinson • Center judge:
- TV announcers (BYUtv/ESPN3): Dave McCann, Blaine Fowler, Lauren Francom McClain

Uniform combination: white helmet, blue jersey, white pants w/ blue accents

Scoring summary

Quarter	Time	Drive			Team	Scoring information	Score	
Quarter	Time	Plays	Yards	TOP	Team	Scoring information	UMASS	BYU
2	5:15	16	74	6:44	UMASS	34-yard field goal by Logan Laurent	3	0
3	13:21	5	74	1:33	UMASS	Andy Isabella 40-yard touchdown reception from Andrew Ford, Logan Laurent kick good	10	0
3	7:15	10	56	4:19	UMASS	28-yard field goal by Logan Laurent	13	0
3	4:55	4	7	1:01	UMASS	35-yard field goal by Logan Laurent	16	0
3	1:35	9	53	1:20	BYU	40-yard field goal by Rhett Almond	16	3
4	0:53	9	87	1:28	BYU	Matt Bushman 6-yard touchdown reception from Joe Critchlow, Rhett Almond kick good	16	10
"TOP" = time of possession. For other American football terms, see Glossary of American football.							16	10

=== Hawaii ===
BYU at Hawaii

Team	1	2	3	4	Total
• Cougars	7	6	7	10	30
Rainbow Warriors	7	0	0	13	20

- Date: November 25
- Location: Aloha Stadium
  Honolulu
- Game start: 4:00 p.m.
- TV announcers (CBSSN): Dave Ryan, Aaron Murray, Cassie McKinney
