= 2018 BYU Cougars football team =

American college football season

2018 BYU Cougars football

Famous Idaho Potato Bowl champion

Famous Idaho Potato Bowl, W 49–18 vs. Western Michigan
- Conference: Independent
- Record: 7–6
- Head coach: Kalani Sitake (3rd season)
- Offensive coordinator: Jeff Grimes (1st season)
- Offensive scheme: Power spread
- Defensive coordinator: Ilaisa Tuiaki (3rd season)
- Base defense: 4–3
- Home stadium: LaVell Edwards Stadium

2018 NCAA Division I FBS independents football records
	Conf.			Overall
Team	W		L	W		L
No. 5 Notre Dame ^		–		12	–	1
No. 19 Army		–		11	–	2
BYU		–		7	–	6
Liberty		–		6	–	6
UMass		–		4	–	8
New Mexico State		–		3	–	9
^ – College Football Playoff participant; Rankings from AP Poll

The 2018 BYU Cougars football team represented Brigham Young University in the 2018 NCAA Division I FBS football season. The Cougars were led by third-year head coach Kalani Sitake, and played their home games at LaVell Edwards Stadium. This was the seventh year BYU competed as an NCAA Division I FBS independent. They finished the season 7–6. They were invited to the Famous Idaho Potato Bowl where they defeated Western Michigan.

== Before the season ==
=== Coaching changes ===
On December 14, 2017, LSU offensive line coach Jeff Grimes was appointed the offensive coordinator replacing Ty Detmer who was relieved as offensive coordinator following the final game of the 2017 season. On December 27, 2017 it was announced that Aaron Roderick, Ryan Pugh, and Fesi Sitake would join the staff as offensive coaches. It was also announced that Steve Clark would remain on staff. On January 19, 2018 Preston Hadley was named to the defensive staff replacing Steve Kaufusi. On February 6, 2018 AJ Seward was named to the offensive staff. Finally Alema Fitisemanu replaced Tevita Ofahengaue as the recruiting coordinator.

=== 2018 recruits ===
Name	Pos.	Height	Weight	Hometown	Notes
Connor Pay	OL	6'5"	270	Highland, Utah	Mission prior to enrolling
Campbell Barrington	OL	6'7"	275	Spokane, Washington	Mission prior to enrolling
Jacob Smith	OL	6'5"	295	Rosemount, Minnesota	
Tysen Lewis	OL	6'5"	260	North Ogden, Utah	Mission prior to enrolling
Ben Tuipulotu	TE	6'4"	200	Fort Mill, South Carolina	Mission prior to enrolling
Brayden Cosper	WR	6'3"	200	South Jordan, Utah	
Oliver Nasilai	LB	6'2"	236	Springdale, Arkansas	Mission prior to enrolling
Isaac Matua	LB	6'3"	205	Kearns, Utah	Mission prior to enrolling
Brach Davis	DB	6'1"	170	Salt Lake City, Utah	
Talan Alfrey	DB	6'3"	185	Auburn, Washington	Mission prior to enrolling
Stacy Connor	QB	6'5"	187	Wylie, Texas	
Zach Wilson	QB	6'3"	205	Draper, Utah	
Isaiah Herron	DB	6'1"	175	Las Vegas, Nevada	
Dallin Holker	TE	6'5"	225	Lehi, Utah	
Gunner Romney	WR	6'3"	200	Chandler, Arizona	
Viliami Tausinga	LB	6'2"	220	Salt Lake City, Utah	Mission prior to enrolling
Malik Moore	DB	6'1"	175	San Diego, California	
Tyler Allgeier	RB	5'11"	200	Fontana, California	
Dax Milne	WR	6'0"	180	South Jordan, Utah	
Payton Wilgar	LB	6'3"	210	St George, Utah	
Michael Thorson	OL	6'5"	290	Ramona, California	
Ben Ward	TE	6'5"	235	Dallastown, Pennsylvania	
Michael Biagi	LB	6'3"	205	Provo, Utah	
Jaylon Vickers	DB	5'10"	180	Salt Lake City, Utah	

=== 2017 returned missionaries ===
Name	Pos.	Height	Weight	Year	Notes
Hank Tuipulotu	TE	6'3"	225	Freshman	
Jaren Hall	QB	6'1"	195	Freshman	
Atunaisa Mahe	DL	6'1"	286	Freshman	
Darius McFarland	RB	6'2"	265	Freshman	
Hirkley Latu	LB	6'3"	230	Freshman	
Devin Kaufusi	DL	6'7"	250	Freshman	
Drew Jensen	LB	6'2"	195	Freshman	
Max Tooley	LB	6'2"	195	Freshman	
JT Gentry	OL	6'5"	280	Freshman	
Clark Barrington	OL	6'6"	270	Freshman	
Ethan Atagi	OL	6'5"	320	Freshman	
Sione Finau	RB	5'11"	180	Freshman	
Jackson Kaufusi	LB	6'2"	210	Freshman	
Skyler Southam	K	6'0"	195	Freshman	
Koy Harris	WR	6'1"	175	Freshman	
Tanner Leishman	TE	6'6"	230	Freshman	
Brock Bastian	LS	6'2"	200	Freshman	
Sam Lee	LB	6'1"	200	Freshman	
Morgan Pyper	RB	6'2"	205	Freshman	
Mitchell Price	DB	6'0"	190	Sophomore	

=== 2018 other additions ===
Name	Pos.	Height	Weight	Year	Notes
Ului Lapuaho	OL	6'7"	330	Junior	Return after sitting out 2017
Zac Dawe	DL	6'4"	275	Junior	Return after sitting out 2017
Hayden Griffitts	QB	6'2"	205	Sophomore	Return after sitting out 2017
Harris LaChance	OL	6'8"	301	Freshman	Transfer from Utah State University
Baylor Romney	QB	6'2"	190	Freshman	Transfer from University of Nevada
Matthew Criddle	LB	6'1"	195	Freshman	Transfer from Snow College
Danny Jones	P	6'4"	235	Sophomore	Transfer from La Trobe University
Michael Bruno	DL	6'5"	240	Sophomore	Transfer from Weber State
Dylan Collie	WR	5'10"	180	Senior	Transfer from University of Hawaii
Jeddy Tuiloma	DL	6'1"	281	Sophomore	Transfer from Butler College
Joshua Buhler	DB	6'1"	205	Junior	Transfer from Snow College
D'Angelo Mandell	DB	6'1"	175	Freshman	Originally Signed 2016

=== 2018 departures ===
Name	Pos.	Height	Weight	Year	Notes
Fred Warner	LB	6'3"	230	Senior	Graduation, drafted by the San Francisco 49ers in the 2018 NFL draft
Va'a Niumatalolo	LB	6'2"	235	Senior	Graduation
Grant Jones	LB	6'6"	205	Senior	Graduation
Jonah Trinnaman	WR	6'0"	190	Senior	Graduation, signed free agent deal with the Arizona Cardinals
Kesni Tausinga	DL	6'1"	300	Senior	Graduation
Handsome Tanielu	DL	6'2"	315	Senior	Graduation
Keyan Norman	OL	6'3"	305	Senior	Graduation
Tejan Koroma	OL	6'0"	290	Senior	Graduation, signed free agent deal with the Kansas City Chiefs
Tuni Kanuch	OL	6'3"	320	Senior	Graduation
Cody Stewart	DB	6'3"	185	Senior	Graduation
Hiva Lee	DB	5'10"	190	Senior	Graduation
Micah Hannemann	DB	6'0"	190	Senior	Graduation, signed free agent deal with the Cleveland Browns
Kamel Greene	DB	5'11"	185	Senior	Graduation
Jonny Linehan	P	6'0"	205	Senior	Graduation
Corey Edwards	K	6'0"	210	Senior	Graduation
Tanner Balderree	TE	6'3"	250	Senior	Graduation
Creed Richardson	RB	6'1"	235	Senior	Graduation
Young Tanner	DB	6'0"	195	Senior	Graduation
Bentley Hanshaw	TE	6'6"	225	Freshman	LDS mission
Chaz Ah You	LB	6'2"	205	Freshman	LDS mission
Tanner Baker	DL	6'5"	255	Freshman	LDS mission
Chayce Bolli	WR	6'0"	190	Freshman	LDS mission
Rylee Gautavai	LB	6'1"	225	Sophomore	Transfer to University of Utah
Koy Detmer Jr.	QB	5'10"	175	Sophomore	Transfer to Texas A&M University Kingsville
Kainoa Fuiava	DL	6'4"	295	Sophomore	Transfer to Idaho State University
Kody Wilstead	QB	6'6"	223	Freshman	Transfer to Coffeyville Community College
Tariq Buchanan	WR	6'0"	190	Freshman	Transfer to Texas Southern University
Phillip Amone	LB	6'0"	235	Junior	Medical
Trey Dye	RB	5'9"	180	Junior	Medical
Morgan Unga	LB	6'5"	220	Junior	Medical
Cody Savage	DL	6'6"	265	Junior	
Garrett England	LB	6'4"	210	Freshman	
Hunter Marshall	TE	6'3"	230	Junior	
Taggart Krueger	WR	6'0"	235	Junior	
Solomone Wolfgramm	DL	6'5"	285	Junior	
Taipe Vaka	OL	6'5"	275	Junior	
Leroy Sitake-Tanoai	OL	6'4"	320	Sophomore	
Will Sedgwick	LB	6'2"	224	Freshman	
Joe Tukuafu	TE	6'4"	275	Freshman	
Ula Tolutau	RB	6'1"	242	Freshman	
Rickey Shumway	WR	6'2"	196	Junior	
Beau Tanner	WR	6'0"	189	Junior	
David Low	DL	6'3"	240	Junior	
K.J. Hall	RB	5'9"	185	Sophomore	Announced Retirement from Playing

=== Award watch lists ===
Listed in the order that they were released

Award	Player	Position	Year
Doak Walker Award	Squally Canada	RB	SR
John Mackey Award	Matt Bushman	TE	SO
Bronko Nagurski Trophy	Corbin Kaufusi	DE	SR
Paul Hornung Award	Austin Kafentzis	DB/KR	JR
Wuerffel Trophy	Adam Pulsipher	LB	SR
Earl Campbell Tyler Rose Award	Micah Simon	WR	JR

== Schedule ==
Date	Time	Opponent	Rank	Site	TV	Result	Attendance
September 1	8:45 p.m.	at Arizona		Arizona Stadium; Tucson, AZ	ESPN	W 28–23	51,002
September 8	8:15 p.m.	California		LaVell Edwards Stadium; Provo, UT	ESPN2	L 18–21	52,602
September 15	1:30 p.m.	at No. 6 Wisconsin		Camp Randall Stadium; Madison, WI	ABC	W 24–21	80,720
September 22	4:00 p.m.	No. 9 (FCS) McNeese State	No. 25	LaVell Edwards Stadium; Provo, UT	BYUtv/ESPN3	W 30–3	53,223
September 29	6:30 p.m.	at No. 11 Washington	No. 20	Husky Stadium; Seattle, WA	FOX	L 7–35	70,155
October 5	7:00 p.m.	Utah State		LaVell Edwards Stadium; Provo, UT (Beehive Boot & The Old Wagon Wheel)	ESPN2	L 20–45	58,087
October 13	8:15 p.m.	Hawaii^{†}		LaVell Edwards Stadium; Provo, UT	ESPN2	W 49–23	52,354
October 27	1:30 p.m.	Northern Illinois		LaVell Edwards Stadium; Provo, UT	ESPNU	L 6–7	51,084
November 3	8:15 p.m.	at Boise State		Albertsons Stadium; Boise, ID	ESPN2	L 16–21	35,241
November 10	10:00 a.m.	at UMass		Gillette Stadium; Foxborough, MA	BYUtv/ELVN	W 35–16	14,082
November 17	8:15 p.m.	New Mexico State		LaVell Edwards Stadium; Provo, UT	ESPN2	W 45–10	47,505
November 24	8:00 p.m.	at No. 18 Utah		Rice–Eccles Stadium; Salt Lake City, UT (Deseret First Duel & Beehive Boot)	FS1	L 27–35	46,017
December 21	2:00 p.m.	vs. Western Michigan		Albertsons Stadium; Boise, ID (Famous Idaho Potato Bowl)	ESPN	W 49–18	18,711
^{†}Homecoming; Rankings from AP Poll released prior to the game; All times are in Mountain time

== Media ==
=== Football Media Day ===
Football Media Day was held at the BYUtv studios on June 22, 2018 and was once again simulcast on BYUtv and ESPN3. TV news was shared as Athletic Director Tom Holmoe announced BYU would formally begin new contract negotiations with ESPN in the fall. Coach Sitake dodged questions about a potential quarterback controversy by saying their main goal was to play the best player possible in each position, and that would be determined in close door practices. The new coaching staff was also interviewed by Dave McCann. Additionally BYU held YouTube and radio player interviews throughout the day and did a feature show on BYU players who are currently in the NFL.

=== Nu Skin BYU Sports Network ===
The 2018 BYU Sports Network will appear slightly different from previous years. Greg Wrubell and Marc Lyons return as play-by-play and analyst, and Jason Shepherd returns as the host. However sideline reporter Nate Meikle left after becoming a lawyer, author, and being hired at Notre Dame’s Mendoza College of Business to be a postdoctoral teaching and research fellow. Replacing Nate as the sideline reporter is Mitchell Juergens.

In August, it was announced this will be Marc Lyons final season calling BYU football, his 38th year with that responsibility.

Affiliates

- BYU Radio – Flagship Station Nationwide (Dish Network 980, Sirius XM 143, TuneIn radio, and byuradio.org)
- KSL 102.7 FM and 1160 AM – (Salt Lake City / Provo, Utah and ksl.com)
- KSNA – Blackfoot / Idaho Falls / Pocatello / Rexburg, Idaho
- KMXD – Monroe / Manti, Utah
- KSVC – Richfield / Manti, Utah
- KCLS – St. George, Utah

== Roster ==
2018 BYU Cougars football team roster
Players
Coaches
Offense

Pos.	#	Name	Class
QB	17	Stacy Connor	Fr
QB	10	Joe Critchlow	So
QB	15	Hayden Griffitts (injured)	So
QB	16	Jaren Hall	Fr
QB	12	Tanner Mangum	Sr
QB	13	Baylor Romney	Fr
QB	11	Zach Wilson	Fr
OL	65	Ethan Atagi (injured)	Fr
OL	56	Clark Barrington	Fr
OL	67	Brady Christensen	Fr
OL	66	James Empey	Fr
OL	68	JT Gentry	Fr
OL	77	Chandon Herring	So
OL	69	Tristen Hoge	So
OL	71	Austin Hoyt	Sr
OL	76	Harris LaChance	Fr
OL	70	Jacob Jimenez	Jr
OL	73	Ului Lapuaho	Sr
OL	74	Kieffer Longson	So
OL	61	Keanu Saleapaga	Fr
OL	59	Thomas Shoaf	Jr
OL	79	Jacob Smith	Fr
OL	78	Michael Thorson	Fr
RB	45	Tyler Allgeier	Fr
RB	34	Riley Burt	Jr
RB	22	Squally Canada (injured)	Sr
RB	35	Brayden El-Bakri	Sr
RB	23	Sione Finau	Fr
RB	44	Kavika Fonua (injured)	Jr
RB	42	Kyle Griffitts (injured)	Jr
RB	2	Matt Hadley (injured)	Sr
RB	7	Beau Hoge (injured)	Jr
RB	4	Lopini Katoa (injured)	Fr
RB	48	Darius McFarland	Fr
RB	36	Morgan Pyper	Fr
RB	42	Johnny Tapusoa (injured)	Jr
TE	89	Matt Bushman	So
TE	32	Dallin Holker	Fr
TE	80	Nate Heaps (injured)	Fr
TE	17	Moroni Laulu-Pututau (injured)	Jr
TE	96	Tanner Leishman	Fr
TE	88	JJ Nwigwe	Sr
TE	87	Addison Pulsipher	Jr
TE	85	Hank Tuipulotu (injured)	Fr
TE	86	Ben Ward	Fr
WR	3	Dylan Collie	Sr
WR	85	Brayden Cosper	Fr
WR	1	Akile Davis	Jr
WR	33	Koy Harris	Fr
WR	15	Aleva Hifo	Jr
WR	83	Inoke Lotulelei	Jr
WR	82	Dax Milne	Fr
WR	84	Neil Pau'u	So
WR	80	Gunner Romney (injured)	Fr
WR	21	Talon Shumway	Jr
WR	13	Micah Simon	Jr
WR	37	Austin Whetzel	So

Defense

Pos.	#	Name	Class
DB	3	Isaiah Armstrong	Jr
DB	24	Joshua Buhler	Jr
DB	4	Brach Davis	Fr
DB	30	Keenan Ellis	Fr
DB	27	Gavin Fowler	Sr
DB	5	Dayan Ghanwoloku	Jr
DB	7	Trevion Greene (injured)	Jr
DB	10	Isaiah Herron	Fr
DB	25	Tanner Jacobson	Sr
DB	24	Austin Kafentzis	Jr
DB	39	Jared Kapisi	So
DB	11	Austin Lee	Jr
DB	36	D'Angelo Mandell	Fr
DB	20	Austin McChesney (injured)	So
DB	12	Malik Moore	Fr
DB	28	Sawyer Powell	Sr
DB	43	Mitchell Price	So
DB	18	Michael Shelton	Sr
DB	24	Jaylon Vickers	Fr
DB	1	Troy Warner	Jr
DB	32	Chris Wilcox (injured)	Jr
DL	75	Michael Bruno	Fr
DL	97	Austin Chambers	So
DL	99	Zac Dawe	So
DL	93	Bracken El-Bakri	Jr
DL	55	Lorenzo Fauatea	So
DL	94	Kamalani Kaluhiokalani	Sr
DL	90	Corbin Kaufusi (injured)	Sr
DL	92	Devin Kaufusi	Fr
DL	60	Motekiai Langi (injured)	Fr
DL	58	Uriah Leiataua	So
DL	62	Atunaisa Mahe	Fr
DL	50	Tevita Mo'unga	Jr
DL	52	Trajan Pili	Jr
DL	54	Merrill Taliauli	Sr
DL	96	Wayne Tei-Kirby	So
DL	59	Alden Tofa	Fr
DL	95	Khyiris Tonga	So
DL	49	Langi Tuifua	So
DL	51	Jeddy Tuiloma	So
DL	91	Earl Tuioti-Mariner	Fr
LB	23	Zayne Anderson (injured)	Sr
LB	48	Michael Biagi	Fr
LB	17	Matthew Criddle	Fr
LB	31	Christian Folau (injured)	Fr
LB	39	Drew Jensen (injured)	Fr
LB	53	Isaiah Kaufusi (injured)	So
LB	47	Jackson Kaufusi (injured)	Fr
LB	21	Hirkley Latu (injured)	Fr
LB	21	Sam Lee	Fr
LB	43	A.J. Lolohea (injured)	Fr
LB	38	Butch Pau'u	Sr
LB	44	Riggs Powell	Sr
LB	41	Adam Pulsipher	Sr
LB	50	Nate Sampson	Sr
LB	46	Rhett Sandlin	Sr
LB	16	Sione Takitaki	Sr
LB	31	Max Tooley	Fr
LB	56	Payton Wilgar	Fr

Special teams

Pos.	#	Name	Class
DS	82	Brock Bastian	Fr
DS	64	Matt Foley	Sr
DS	98	Mitch Harris	Jr
P	26	Rhett Almond	Sr
P	19	Danny Jones	So
K	29	Andrew Mikkelsen	Sr
K	20	Skyler Southam	Fr

Head coach

- Kalani Sitake (BYU)

Coordinators/assistant coaches

- Ed Lamb (BYU)
  Assistant head coach, special teams, linebackers
- Jeff Grimes (UTEP)
  Offensive coordinator
- Aaron Roderick (BYU)
  Passing game coordintor/quarterbacks
- Ryan Pugh (Auburn)
  Offensive line
- Fesi Sitake (Southern Utah)
  Wide receivers
- Steve Clark (BYU)
  Tight ends
- AJ Seward (Kansas)
  Running backs
- Ilaisa Tuiaki (Southern Utah)
  Defensive coordinator, defensive line
- Jernaro Gilford (BYU)
  Cornerbacks
- Preston Hadley (BYU)
  Safeties
- Nu'u Tafisi (California)
  Strength and conditioning
- Justin McClure (Northern Colorado)
  Asst. strength and conditioning
- AJ Middleton (Redlands)
  Asst. strength and conditioning
- Jon Swift (BYU)
  Director of football operations
- Alema Fitisemanu (BYU)
  Director of recruiting operations
- Jack Damuni (BYU)
  Director of player personnel
- Jasen Ah You (BYU)
  Director of athletic relations
- Tasha Bell (Utah Valley)
  Director of player development
- Dallas Reynolds (BYU)
  Offensive graduate assistant
- Vince Feula (BYU)
  Defensive graduate assistant
- Harvey Unga (BYU)
  Offensive graduate assistant
- Manase Tonga (BYU)
  Defensive graduate assistant

Legend

- (C) Team captain
- (S) Suspended
- (I) Ineligible
- Injured
- Redshirt

Roster

=== Depth chart ===
Defense

FS
Austin Lee
Troy Warner
Isaiah Armstrong

WLB	MLB	SLB
Tanner Jacobson	Sione Takitaki	Rhett Sandlin
Adam Pulsipher	Butch Pau'u	Riggs Powell
Matthew Criddle	Nate Sampson	Max Tooley

SS
Dayan Ghanwoloku
Sawyer Powell
Malik Moore

CB
Keenan Ellis
D'Angelo Mandell
Mitchell Price

DE	DT	DT	DE
Devin Kaufusi	Khyiris Tonga	Bracken El-bakri	Trajan Pili
Lorenzo Fauatea	Merrill Taliauli	Zac Dawe	Uriah Leiataua
Earl Tuioti-Mariner	Kamalani Kaluhiokialani	Jeddy Tuiloma	Alden Tofa

CB
Michael Shelton
Jaylon Vickers
Jared Kapisi

Offense

X-Receiver
Dylan Collie
Dax Milne
Micah Simon

LT	LG	C	RG	RT
Brady Christensen	Keiffer Longson	James Empey	Tristen Hoge	Austin Hoyt
Thomas Shoaf	Keanu Saleapaga	Jacob Jimenez	Channon Herring	Ului Lapuaho
Jacob Smith	J.T. Gentry	Tristen Hoge	Clark Barrington	Harris LaChance

TE
Matt Bushman
Dallin Holker
Addison Pulsipher

Z-Receiver
Aleva Hifo
Talon Shumway
Neil Pau'u

QB
Zach Wilson
Tanner Mangum
Jaren Hall

Key reserves
WR Inoke Lotulelei
WR Akile Davis
WR Koy Harris
DL Austin Chambers
QB Joe Critchlow
DB Gavin Fowler
DB Austin Kafentzis
DB Joshua Buhler

RB
Riley Burt
Tyler Allgeier
Sione Finau

FB
Brayden El-bakri
Darius McFarland
⋅

Special teams
PK Skyler Southam
PK Andrew Mikkelsen
P Rhett Almond
P Danny Jones
KR Tanner Jacobson
KR Dayan Ghanwoluku
PR Michael Shelton
PR Dylan Collie
LS Mitch Harris
LS Matt Foley
H Gavin Fowler
H Tanner Jacobson

== Rankings ==
Ranking movements Legend: ██ Increase in ranking ██ Decrease in ranking — = Not ranked RV = Received votes
	Week															
Poll	Pre	1	2	3	4	5	6	7	8	9	10	11	12	13	14	Final
AP	—	RV	—	25	20	RV	—	—	—	—	—	—	—	—	—	
Coaches	—	—	—	RV	RV	RV	—	—	—	—	—	—	—	—	—	
CFP	Not released									—	—	—	—	—	—	Not released

== Game summaries ==
=== Arizona ===
BYU at Arizona

Team	1	2	3	4	Total
• Cougars	0	7	21	0	28
Wildcats	0	10	0	13	23

- Date: September 1
- Location: Arizona Stadium
  Tempe, Arizona
- Game start: 7:50 p.m. MST
- Elapsed time: 3:24
- Game attendance: 51,002
- Game weather: 88 °F (31 °C), Winds S 9 mph; Mostly clear
- Referee: Scott Campbell • Umpire: Rick Podraza • Linesman: Doug Moore • Line judge: Keith Garmond • Back judge: Terry White • Field judge: Matt Mills • Side judge: Tuim Murray • Center judge: Ian Malepeai
- TV announcers (ESPN/Sports USA): Adam Amin, Rod Gilmore, Quint Kessenich (ESPN)
  John Ahlers and Doug Plank (Sports USA)

Uniform combination: white helmet, white jersey, white pants w/ blue accents.

Scoring summary

Quarter	Time	Drive			Team	Scoring information	Score	
Quarter	Time	Plays	Yards	TOP	Team	Scoring information	BYU	ARIZ
2	9:58	9	59	4:38	BYU	Squally Canada 1-yard touchdown run, Skyler Southam kick good	7	0
2	5:39	12	71	4:13	ARIZ	24-yard field goal by Lucas Havrisik	7	3
2	0:50	9	77	2:29	ARIZ	Tony Ellison 15-yard touchdown reception from Khalil Tate, Lucas Havrisik kick good	7	10
3	8:25	10	75	6:35	BYU	Matt Bushman 24-yard touchdown reception from Tanner Mangum, Skyler Southam kick good	14	10
3	4:29	9	58	2:35	BYU	Squally Canada 1-yard touchdown run, Skyler Southam kick good	21	10
3	1:07	5	36	2:14	BYU	Squally Canada 2-yard touchdown run, Skyler Southam kick good	28	10
4	13:29	9	75	2:31	ARIZ	Khalil Tate 2-yard touchdown run, Lucas Havrisik kick good	28	17
4	3:20	8	67	1:28	ARIZ	J. J. Taylor 1-yard touchdown run, 2-point Khalil Tate pass failed	28	23
"TOP" = time of possession. For other American football terms, see Glossary of American football.							28	23

=== Cal ===
Cal at BYU

Team	1	2	3	4	Total
• Golden Bears	7	0	7	7	21
Cougars	0	3	7	8	18

- Date: September 8
- Location: LaVell Edwards Stadium
  Provo, Utah
- Game start: 8:20 p.m. MDT
- Elapsed time: 3:29
- Game attendance: 52, 602
- Game weather: 79 °F (26 °C), Winds S 8 mph; Partly Cloudy
- Referee: Reggie Smith • Umpire: Mar Fitzgerald • Linesman: Rick Smith • Line judge: Scott Reilly • Back judge: Joel Wetzel • Field judge: Randy Smith • Side judge: Richard Corona • Center judge: Dan Scanlan
- TV announcers (ESPN2/BYUtv): Roy Philpott, Tom Ramsey, Mark Morgan (ESPN2)
  Dave McCann, Blaine Fowler, Lauren McClain (BYUtv)

Uniform combination: white helmet, white jersey, white pants w/ blue accents.

Scoring summary

Quarter	Time	Drive			Team	Scoring information	Score	
Quarter	Time	Plays	Yards	TOP	Team	Scoring information	CAL	BYU
1	1:46	11	80	4:31	CAL	Patrick Laird 25-yard touchdown reception from Chase Garbers, Greg Thomas kick good	7	0
2	7:53	13	67	6:15	BYU	36-yard field goal by Skyler Southam	7	3
2	12:10	7	79	2:44	CAL	Kanawai Noa 52-yard touchdown reception from Chase Garbers, Greg Thomas kick good	14	3
3	10:07				BYU	Dayan Ghanwoloku 36-yard fumble return for a touchdown, Skyler Southam kick good	14	10
4	13:42	11	85	4:57	CAL	Brand McIlwain 2-yard touchdown run, Greg Thomas kick good	21	10
4	0:51	13	73	2:47	BYU	Brayden El-Bakiri 1-yard touchdown reception from Tanner Mangum, 2-point Tanner Mangum pass to Micah Simon good	21	18
"TOP" = time of possession. For other American football terms, see Glossary of American football.							21	18

=== Wisconsin ===
BYU at Wisconsin

Team	1	2	3	4	Total
• Cougars	7	7	7	3	24
No. 6 Badgers	7	7	0	7	21

- Date: September 15
- Location: Camp Randall Stadium
  Madison, Wisconsin
- Game start: 2:36 p.m. CDT
- Elapsed time: 3:12
- Game attendance: 80,720
- Game weather: 83 °F (28 °C), Winds SE 6mph, Sunny
- Referee: Cooper Castleberry • Umpire: Jay Edwards • Linesman: John Braun • Line judge: Kelly Deterding • Back judge: Donnie Aultman • Field judge: Scott Gaines • Side judge: Anthony Flemming • Center judge: Chris Tallent
- TV announcers (ABC): Bob Wischusen, Brock Huard, Allison Williams

Uniform combination: white helmet, white jersey, blue pants w/ white accents.

Scoring summary

Quarter	Time	Drive			Team	Scoring information	Score	
Quarter	Time	Plays	Yards	TOP	Team	Scoring information	BYU	WIS
1	7:12	8	61	3:58	WIS	Taiwan Deal 2-yard touchdown run, Rafael Gaglianone kick good	0	7
1	4:02	6	75	3:10	BYU	Squally Canada 3-yard touchdown run, Skyler Southam kick good	7	7
2	12:17	10	89	4:43	BYU	Moroni Laulu-Pututau 31-yard touchdown reception from Aleva Hifo, Skyler Southam kick good	14	7
2	1:17	10	65	4:38	WIS	Alec Ingold 2-yard touchdown run, Rafael Gaglianone kick good	14	14
3	9:54	6	27	2:11	BYU	Squally Canada 2-yard touchdown run, Skyler Southam kick good	21	14
4	12:43	10	82	4:31	WIS	Taiwan Deal 5-yard touchdown run, Rafael Gaglianone kick good	21	21
4	9:58	5	47	2:45	BYU	45-yard field goal by Skyler Southam	24	21
"TOP" = time of possession. For other American football terms, see Glossary of American football.							24	21

=== McNeese ===
McNeese at BYU

Team	1	2	3	4	Total
No. 9 (FCS) Cowboys	3	0	0	0	3
• No. 25 Cougars	0	24	6	0	30

- Date: September 22
- Location: LaVell Edwards Stadium
  Provo, Utah
- Game start: 4:05 p.m. MDT
- Elapsed time: 3:03
- Game attendance: 53,223
- Game weather: 87 °F (31 °C), Winds S 8mph, Sunny w/ some clouds
- Referee: Brad VanVark • Umpire: Michael Cooper • Linesman: George Gusman • Line judge: Frank LeBlanc • Back judge: Tuta Salaam • Field judge: Brian Ernest • Side judge: Darren Winkley • Center judge: David Ames
- TV announcers (BYUtv): Dave McCann, Blaine Fowler, Lauren McClain

Uniform combination: white helmet, navy blue jersey, white pants w/ blue accents.

Scoring summary

Quarter	Time	Drive			Team	Scoring information	Score	
Quarter	Time	Plays	Yards	TOP	Team	Scoring information	MCN	BYU
1	6:38	8	48	2:43	MCN	20-yard field goal by Gunnar Raborn	3	0
2	8:42	8	79	2:56	BYU	Lopini Katoa 4-yard touchdown run, Skyler Southam kick good	3	7
2	6:37	5	31	1:37	BYU	Talon Shumway 7-yard touchdown reception from Tanner Mangum, Skyler Southam kick good	3	14
2	1:09	4	35	1:28	BYU	Lopini Katoa 14-yard touchdown run, Skyler Southam kick good	3	21
2	0:00	4	12	0:53	BYU	30-yard field goal by Skyler Southam	3	24
3	8:53	12	70	6:07	BYU	22-yard field goal by Skyler Southam	3	27
3	1:49	4	7	1:16	BYU	47-yard field goal by Skyler Southam	3	30
"TOP" = time of possession. For other American football terms, see Glossary of American football.							3	30

=== Washington ===
BYU at Washington

Team	1	2	3	4	Total
No. 20 Cougars	0	0	0	7	7
• No. 11 Huskies	7	14	14	0	35

- Date: September 29
- Location: Husky Stadium
  Seattle, Washington
- Game start: 5:35 PDT
- Elapsed time: 2:52
- Game attendance: 70,155
- Game weather: 88 °F (31 °C), Winds SE 5mph, Cloudy
- Referee: Brandon Cruse • Umpire: Tab Slaughter • Linesman: Mike Moeller • Line judge: Jay Bilbo • Back judge: Lyndon Nixon • Field judge: Nick Lave • Side judge: Corey Luxner • Center judge: Mike Contreraz
- TV announcers (FOX): Aaron Goldsmith, Brady Quinn, Bruce Feldman

Uniform combination: white helmet, white jersey, navy blue pants w/ white accents.

Scoring summary

Quarter	Time	Drive			Team	Scoring information	Score	
Quarter	Time	Plays	Yards	TOP	Team	Scoring information	BYU	WASH
1	7:19	8	68	3:45	WASH	Salvon Ahmed 5-yard touchdown run, Peyton Henry kick good	0	7
2	11:05	6	72	2:37	WASH	Myles Gaskin 6-yard touchdown run, Peyton Henry kick good	0	14
2	0:05	3	24	0:17	WASH	Jake Browning 9-yard touchdown run, Peyton Henry kick good	0	21
3	9:31	7	48	3:47	WASH	Drew Sample 15-yard touchdown reception from Jake Browning, Peyton Henry kick good	0	28
3	1:24	8	80	4:42	WASH	Salvon Ahmed 6-yard touchdown run, Peyton Henry kick good	0	35
4	0:41	7	21	4:08	BYU	Lopini Katoa 1-yard touchdown run, Skyler Southam kick good	7	35
"TOP" = time of possession. For other American football terms, see Glossary of American football.							7	35

=== Utah State ===
Utah State at BYU

Team	1	2	3	4	Total
• Aggies	14	7	14	10	45
Cougars	0	7	6	7	20

- Date: October 5
- Location: LaVell Edwards Stadium
  Provo, Utah
- Game start: 7:05 p.m. MDT
- Elapsed time: 3:25
- Game attendance: 58,087
- Game weather: 57 °F (14 °C), Winds Calm, Clear
- Referee: Kevin Boitmann • Umpire: Mark Warner • Linesman: Greg Downum • Line judge: Carlos Owens • Back judge: Micha Aaronian • Field judge: Scott Melancon • Side judge: Dave Curschman • Center judge: Tyree Walton
- TV announcers (ESPN2/BYUtv): Mark Neely, John Congemi, Quint Kessenich (ESPN2)
  Dave McCann, Blaine Fowler, Lauren McClain (BYUtv)

Uniform combination: white helmet, royal blue jersey, white pants w/ royal blue accents.

Scoring summary

Quarter	Time	Drive			Team	Scoring information	Score	
Quarter	Time	Plays	Yards	TOP	Team	Scoring information	USU	BYU
1	7:35				USU	Interception returned 56 yards for touchdown by Tipa Galeai, Dominik Eberle kick good	7	0
1	1:50	11	71	3:43	USU	Gerold Bright 2-yard touchdown reception from Jordan Love, Dominik Eberle kick good	14	0
2	12:23	6	35	2:31	USU	Ron'quavion Tarver 6-yard touchdown reception from Jordan Love, Dominik Eberle kick good	21	0
2	4:28	9	88	4:46	BYU	Lopini Katoa 5-yard touchdown reception from Tanner Mangum, Skyler Southam kick good	21	7
3	10:35	10	81	4:20	USU	Jalen Greene 6-yard touchdown reception from Jordan Love, Dominik Eberle kick good	28	7
3	4:55	10	82	3:32	USU	Ron'quavion Tarver 4-yard touchdown reception from Jordan Love, Dominik Eberle kick good	35	7
3	3:07	5	75	1:48	BYU	Dylan Collie 9-yard touchdown reception from Tanner Mangum, Skyler Southam kick failed	35	13
4	12:03	9	51	2:57	USU	Jordan Love 2-yard touchdown run, Dominik Eberle kick good	42	13
4	6:51	6	25	3:12	USU	47-yard field goal by Dominik Eberle	45	13
4	3:07	6	77	2:32	BYU	Gunner Romney 18-yard touchdown reception from Zach Wilson, Andrew Mikkelsen kick good	45	20
"TOP" = time of possession. For other American football terms, see Glossary of American football.							45	20

=== Hawai'i ===
Hawai'i at BYU

Team	1	2	3	4	Total
Rainbow Warriors	0	3	14	6	23
• Cougars	14	14	7	14	49

- Date: October 13
- Location: LaVell Edwards Stadium
  Provo, UT
- Game start: 8:20 p.m. MDT
- Elapsed time: 3:27
- Game attendance: 52,354
- Game weather: 51 °F (11 °C), Winds W 3mph, Clear
- Referee: Mike Defee • Umpire: Robert Richeson • Linesman: Al Green • Line judge: Derek Anderson • Back judge: Terry Jones • Field judge: Joe Blubaugh • Side judge: Lo Pham • Center judge: Marvel July
- TV announcers (ESPN2/BYUtv): Anish Shroff, Ahmad Brooks, Roddy Jones (ESPN2)
  Dave McCann, Blaine Fowler, Lauren McClain (BYUtv)

Uniform combination: white helmet, navy blue jersey, white pants w/ blue accents.

Scoring summary

Quarter	Time	Drive			Team	Scoring information	Score	
Quarter	Time	Plays	Yards	TOP	Team	Scoring information	UH	BYU
1	7:48	12	87	4:32	BYU	Lopini Katoa 12-yard touchdown run, Skyler Southam kick good	0	7
1	1:02	7	56	3:03	BYU	Zach Wilson 23-yard touchdown run, Skyler Southam kick good	0	14
2	7:24	6	54	3:04	BYU	Matt Hadley 21-yard touchdown run, Skyler Southam kick good	0	21
2	4:24	9	64	2:53	UH	33-yard field goal by Ryan Meskell	3	21
2	1:35	1	13	0:06	BYU	Dallin Holker 13-yard touchdown reception from Zach Wilson, Skyler Southam kick good	3	28
3	10:25	9	52	3:03	UH	Dayton Furuta 1-yard touchdown run, Ryan Meskell kick good	10	28
3	6:39	5	35	1:44	BYU	Riley Burt 3-yard touchdown run, Skyler Southam kick good	10	35
3	2:57	9	69	3:36	UH	Dayton Furuta 20-yard touchdown reception from Cole McDonald, Ryan Meskell kick good	17	35
4	10:50	12	75	7:07	BYU	Aleva Hifo 24-yard touchdown reception from Zach Wilson, Skyler Southam kick good	17	42
4	7:08	11	75	3:42	UH	John Urusa 17-yard touchdown reception from Cole McDonald, 2-point run by John Ursua failed	23	42
4	3:45	7	75	3:17	BYU	Gunner Romney 26-yard touchdown reception from Zach Wilson, Skyler Southam kick good	23	49
"TOP" = time of possession. For other American football terms, see Glossary of American football.							23	49

=== Northern Illinois ===
Northern Illinois at BYU

Team	1	2	3	4	Total
• Huskies	0	0	7	0	7
Cougars	3	0	3	0	6

- Date: October 27
- Location: LaVell Edwards Stadium
  Provo, Utah
- Game start: 1:35 p.m. MDT
- Elapsed time: 3:07
- Game attendance: 51,084
- Game weather: 66 °F (19 °C), Winds Calm, Cloudy
- Referee: Tom Stapleton • Umpire: John Hanneke • Linesman: Robi DeLorenzo • Line judge: Gary Jagodzinski • Back judge: Reggie Berry • Field judge: Scot McDonald • Side judge: George Plesac • Center judge: Rich Edwards
- TV announcers (ESPNU/BYUtv): Kevin Brown, Andre Ware (ESPNU)
  Dave McCann, Blaine Fowler, Lauren McClain (BYUtv)

Uniform combination: white helmet, navy blue jersey, white pants w/ pink accents. (Breast cancer awareness game)

Scoring summary

Quarter	Time	Drive			Team	Scoring information	Score	
Quarter	Time	Plays	Yards	TOP	Team	Scoring information	NIU	BYU
1	3:08	13	72	6:28	BYU	35-yard field goal by Skyler Southam	0	3
3	11:19	10	65	3:41	NIU	Marcus Childers 1-yard touchdown run, Andrew Gantz kick good	7	3
3	3:31	9	57	4:10	BYU	22-yard field goal by Skyler Southam	7	6
"TOP" = time of possession. For other American football terms, see Glossary of American football.							7	6

=== Boise State ===
BYU at Boise State

Team	1	2	3	4	Total
Cougars	0	6	7	3	16
• Broncos	14	0	7	0	21

- Date: November 3
- Location: Albertsons Stadium
  Boise, Idaho
- Game start: 8:25 p.m. MDT
- Elapsed time: 3:27
- Game attendance: 35,241
- Game weather: 49 °F (9 °C), Winds W 6mph, Mostly Cloudy
- Referee: Eddy Shelton • Umpire: Stuart Schake • Linesman: Brad Edwards • Line judge: Quentin Givens • Back judge: Dan Young • Field judge: Rich Almeroth • Side judge: Fulton Carson • Center judge: Stacy Hardin
- TV announcers (ESPN2): Kevin Brown, Andre Ware, Alex Corddry

Uniform combination: white helmet, white jersey, blue pants w/ white accents.

Scoring summary

Quarter	Time	Drive			Team	Scoring information	Score	
Quarter	Time	Plays	Yards	TOP	Team	Scoring information	BYU	BSU
1	9:27	7	41	4:04	BSU	Alex Mattison 1-yard touchdown run, Haden Hoggarth kick good	0	7
1	0:54	11	69	4:59	BSU	AJ Richardson 7-yard touchdown reception from Brett Rypien, Haden Hoggarth kick good	0	14
2	9:08	12	67	5:01	BYU	26-yard field goal by Skyler Southam	3	14
2	4:58	7	-7	3:56	BYU	43-yard field goal by Skyler Southam	6	14
3	9:46	5	68	2:00	BYU	Zach Wilson 4-yard touchdown run, Skyler Southam kick good	13	14
3	1:44	16	79	8:02	BSU	Alex Mattison 3-yard touchdown run, Haden Hoggarth kick good	13	21
4	6:32	12	42	5:01	BYU	26-yard field goal by Skyler Southam	16	21
"TOP" = time of possession. For other American football terms, see Glossary of American football.							16	21

=== UMass ===
BYU at UMass

Team	1	2	3	4	Total
• Cougars	7	7	14	7	35
Minutemen	10	0	0	6	16

- Date: November 10
- Location: Gillette Stadium
  Foxboro, Massachusetts
- Game start: 12:05 p.m. EST
- Elapsed time: 2:45
- Game attendance: 14,082
- Game weather: 45 °F (7 °C), Winds W 14mph, Mostly Cloudy
- Referee: Scott Campbell • Umpire: Rick Podraza • Linesman: Doug Moore • Line judge: Keith Garmond • Back judge: Terry White • Field judge: Matt Mills • Side judge: Tim Murray • Center judge: Mike Cuttone
- TV announcers (BYUtv/ELVN): Eric Frede, Andy Gresh, Bill Spaulding

Uniform combination: white helmet, white jersey, blue pants w/ white accents.

Scoring summary

Quarter	Time	Drive			Team	Scoring information	Score	
Quarter	Time	Plays	Yards	TOP	Team	Scoring information	BYU	UMASS
1	7:57	14	72	7:03	UMASS	20-yard field goal by Cooper Garcia	0	3
1	4:12	8	31	3:40	UMASS	Marquis Young 2-yard touchdown run, Cooper Garcia kick good	0	10
1	2:33	4	69	1:39	BYU	Talon Shumway 4-yard touchdown reception from Zach Wilson, Skyler Southam kick good	7	10
2	1:50	10	68	3:17	BYU	Talon Shumway 15-yard touchdown reception from Zach Wilson, Skyler Southam kick good	14	10
3	8:08	5	75	2:21	BYU	Matt Hadley 2-yard touchdown run, Skyler Southam kick good	21	10
3	2:03	7	62	3:02	BYU	Aleva Hifo 3-yard touchdown run, Skyler Southam kick good	28	10
4	12:47	6	43	2:13	BYU	Aleva Hifo 10-yard touchdown run, Skyler Southam kick good	35	10
4	5:16	10	86	3:46	UMASS	Ross Cosmis 5-yard touchdown run, 2-point run by Marquis Young failed	35	16
"TOP" = time of possession. For other American football terms, see Glossary of American football.							35	16

=== New Mexico State ===
New Mexico State at BYU

Team	1	2	3	4	Total
Aggies	7	0	3	0	10
• Cougars	7	24	7	7	45

- Date: November 17
- Location: LaVell Edwards Stadium
  Provo, Utah
- Game start: 8:20 p.m. MST
- Elapsed time: 3:34
- Game attendance: 47,505
- Game weather: 36 °F (2 °C), Winds ENE 4mph, Partly Cloudy
- Referee: Steve Baron • Umpire: Bill Bishop • Linesman: George Shoup • Line judge: John Kilmer • Back judge: Dave Baldwin • Field judge: Kirk Wisnewski • Side judge: Rick Ockey • Center judge: Corey Long
- TV announcers (ESPN2/BYUtv): Roy Philpott, Tom Ramsey (ESPN2)
  Dave McCann, Blaine Fowler, Lauren McClain (BYUtv)

Uniform combination: white helmet, royal blue jersey, white pants w/ royal blue accents.

Scoring summary

Quarter	Time	Drive			Team	Scoring information	Score	
Quarter	Time	Plays	Yards	TOP	Team	Scoring information	NMSU	BYU
1	9:18	13	85	4:27	NMSU	Drew Dan 17-yard touchdown reception from Josh Adkins, Dylan Brown kick good	7	0
1	2:20	4	15	0:55	BYU	Matt Hadley 1-yard touchdown run, Skyler Southam kick good	7	7
2	8:29	7	77	3:19	BYU	Matt Hadley 40-yard touchdown run, Skyler Southam kick good	7	14
2	4:47	5	58	4:43	BYU	Lopini Katoa 15-yard touchdown run, Skyler Southam kick good	7	21
2	1:36	7	60	2:07	BYU	Lopini Katoa 13-yard touchdown run, Skyler Southam kick good	7	28
2	0:00	7	37	1:04	BYU	23-yard field goal by Skyler Southam	7	31
3	5:37	9	78	4:13	BYU	Lopini Katoa 14-yard touchdown run, Skyler Southam kick good	7	38
3	2:22	6	15	1:08	NMSU	33-yard field goal by Dylan Brown	10	38
4	13:09	3	73	1:05	BYU	Lopini Katoa 1-yard touchdown run, Skyler Southam kick good	10	45
"TOP" = time of possession. For other American football terms, see Glossary of American football.							10	45

=== Utah ===
BYU at Utah

Team	1	2	3	4	Total
Cougars	13	7	7	0	27
• No. 18 Utes	0	0	14	21	35

- Date: November 24
- Location: Rice–Eccles Stadium
  Salt Lake City, Utah
- Game start: 8:16 p.m. MST
- Elapsed time: 3:10
- Game attendance: 46,017
- Game weather: 33 °F (1 °C), Winds NE 10mph, Partly Cloudy
- Referee: Kevin Hassell • Umpire: Apollo Martin • Linesman: Jeff Hutcheon • Line judge: David Young • Back judge: Bobby Lynn • Field judge: Matt Binford • Side judge: Mark Graves • Center judge: Abram Anaya
- TV announcers (FS1): Guy Haberman, Evan Moore

Uniform combination: white helmet, royal blue jersey, white pants w/ royal blue accents.

Scoring summary

Quarter	Time	Drive			Team	Scoring information	Score	
Quarter	Time	Plays	Yards	TOP	Team	Scoring information	BYU	UTAH
1	10:55	5	33	1:56	BYU	Neil Pau'u 10-yard touchdown reception from Zach Wilson, Skyler Southam kick no good	6	0
2	3:57	4	66	1:34	BYU	Matt Bushman 26-yard touchdown reception from Zach Wilson, Skyler Southam kick good	13	0
2	0:25	14	64	6:22	BYU	Matt Hadley 1-yard touchdown run, Skyler Southam kick good	20	0
3	11:33				UTAH	Interception returned 27 yards for touchdown by Julian Blackmon, Matt Gay kick good	20	7
3	5:28	8	44	2:48	BYU	Matt Hadley 1-yard touchdown run, Skyler Southam kick good	27	7
3	0:40	14	75	4:48	UTAH	Samson Nacua 10-yard touchdown reception from Jason Shelley, Matt Gay kick no good	27	14
4	10:53	7	45	2:47	UTAH	Armand Shyne 2-yard touchdown run, Matt Gay kick good	27	21
4	3:02	10	70	4:24	UTAH	Armand Shyne 5-yard touchdown run, Matt Gay kick good	27	28
4	1:43	1	33	0:10	UTAH	Jason Shelley 33-yard touchdown run, Matt Gay kick good	27	35
"TOP" = time of possession. For other American football terms, see Glossary of American football.							27	35

=== Western Michigan (Famous Idaho Potato Bowl) ===
Western Michigan vs. BYU

Team	1	2	3	4	Total
Broncos	0	10	0	8	18
• Cougars	7	0	28	14	49

- Date: December 22
- Location: Albertsons Stadium
  Boise, Idaho
- Game start: 2:05 p.m. MST
- Elapsed time: 3:20
- Game attendance: 18,711
- Game weather: 41 °F (5 °C), Winds NW 11mph, Partly Cloudy
- Referee: Jeremy Parker • Umpire: Stan Jackson • Linesman: Mike Boles • Line judge: Ralph Green • Back judge: Lance Bobbitt • Field judge: Brandon Harris • Side judge: Bryan Murphy • Center judge: Mike Block
- TV announcers (ESPN/Gameday Radio): Roy Philpott, Tom Ramsey, Alex Corddry (ESPN)
  Scott Garrard, Hans Olsen, Chris Lewis (Gameday Radio)

Uniform combination: white helmet, royal blue jersey, royal blue pants w/ white accents.

Scoring summary

Quarter	Time	Drive			Team	Scoring information	Score	
Quarter	Time	Plays	Yards	TOP	Team	Scoring information	WMU	BYU
1	2:20	2	27	0:41	BYU	Dylan Collie 26-yard touchdown reception from Zach Wilson, Skyler Southam kick good	0	7
2	3:07	4	40	1:53	WMU	Jamauri Bogan 33-yard touchdown run, Gavin Peddie kick good	7	7
2	0:24	11	51	1:14	WMU	37-yard field goal by Gavin Peddie	10	7
3	13:14	3	69	1:46	BYU	Dylan Collie 8-yard touchdown reception from Zach Wilson, Skyler Southam kick good	10	14
3	7:29	4	74	1:27	BYU	Riley Burt 37-yard touchdown run, Skyler Southam kick good	10	21
3	5:04	2	27	0:45	BYU	Aleva Hifo 70-yard touchdown reception from Zach Wilson, Skyler Southam kick good	10	28
3	2:47	3	32	1:19	BYU	Dayan Ghanwoloku 1-yard touchdown run, Skyler Southam kick good	10	35
4	11:38	4	54	1:47	BYU	Dax Milne 5-yard touchdown reception from Zach Wilson, Skyler Southam kick good	10	42
4	7:37	9	75	4:01	WMU	Kaleb Eleby 1-yard touchdown run, 2-point pass from Kaleb Eleby to Jayden Reed good	18	42
4	4:07	7	75	3:30	BYU	Brayden El-Bakri 1-yard touchdown run, Skyler Southam kick good	18	49
"TOP" = time of possession. For other American football terms, see Glossary of American football.							18	49

== Players drafted into the NFL ==
Round	Pick	Player	Position	NFL Club
3	80	Sione Takitaki	LB	Cleveland Browns
