= Grant Amjad Miller =

American politician

- جرانت أمجد ميلر
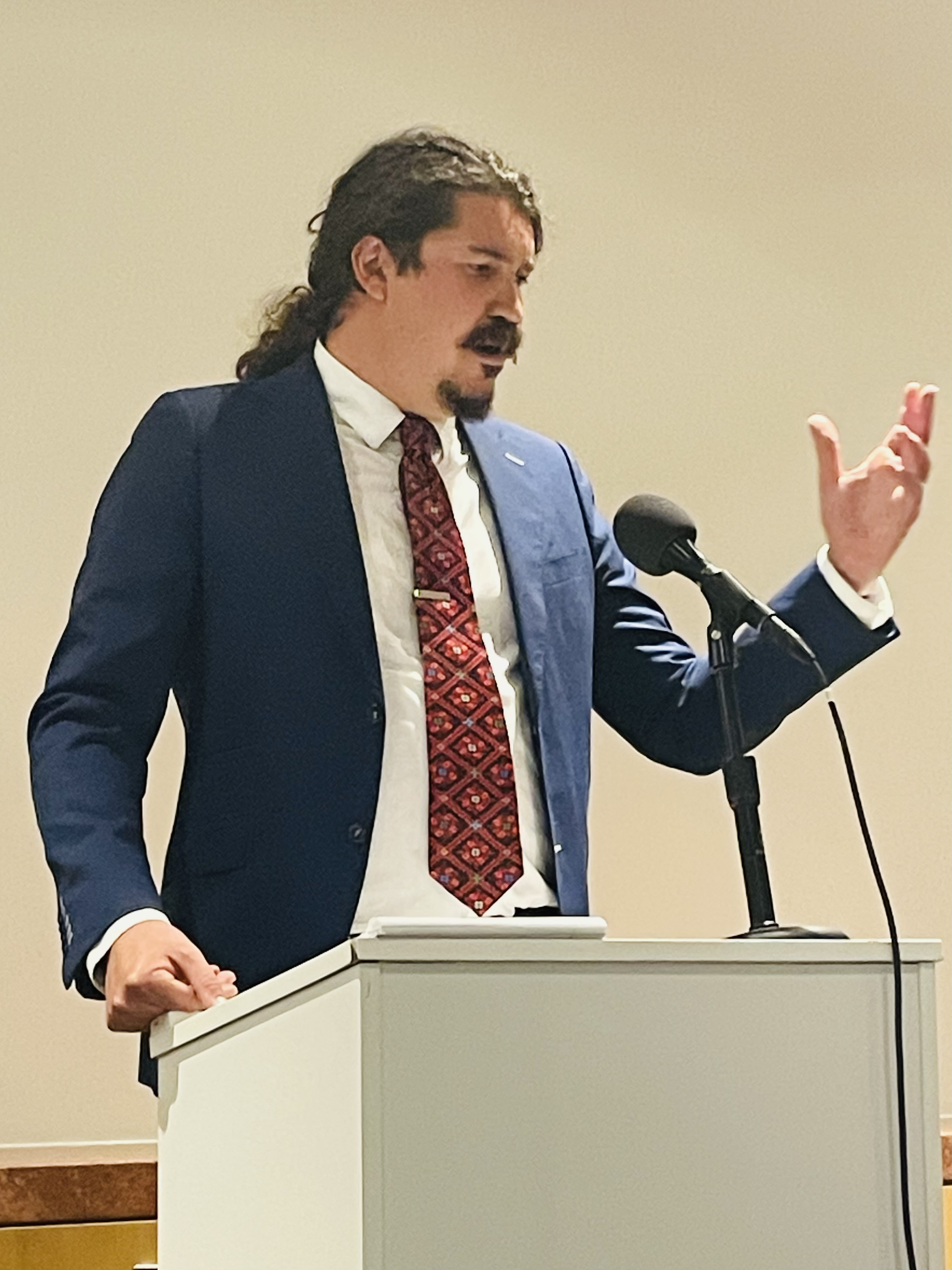
- Miller speaking at the Salt Lake City Main Library during a primary election debate on June 3, 2025

Member of the Utah House of Representatives from the 24th district
- Incumbent
- Assumed office January 1, 2025
- Preceded by: Joel Briscoe
- Constituency: House District 24

Personal details
- Party: Democratic
- Spouse: Karly (m. 2022)
- Education: Snow College (AS), University of Utah (BA, JD)

Grant Amjad Miller (Arabic:جرانت أمجد ميلر) is an American lawyer and politician who serves in the Utah House of Representatives from the 24th district as a member of the Democratic Party since 2025. The son of a Palestinian from the West Bank, he is the first Palestinian American elected to the state house.

== Early life and education ==
Grant Amjad Miller's mother was born in the West Bank and met Miller's father in Wisconsin while visiting her brother. Miller moved to Utah with his family at the age of one.

Miller graduated Jordan High School. He received an associate degree from Snow College, a bachelor of arts in speech communication from the University of Utah, and a Juris Doctor from S.J. Quinney College of Law. He was admitted to the Utah State Bar and worked as a public defender.

== Career ==
Erin Mendenhall, a member of the Salt Lake City Council from the 5th district, was elected mayor in the 2019 election. Miller was one of twenty eight candidates that applied to be appointed to Mendenhall's seat after she vacated it to become mayor, but Darin Masao Mano was selected instead. From 2018 to 2024, Miller was a member of the community council in Liberty Wells.

In the 2024 election Miller ran for a seat in the Utah House of Representatives from the 24th district and defeated Joel Briscoe and Ramon Barthelemy for the Democratic nomination and faced no opposition in the general election. He was the first Palestinian American elected to the state house. During Miller's tenure in the state house he served on the Economic Development and Workforce Services, and Judiciary committees.

== Personal life ==
Miller married Karly at the Utah Supreme Court in 2022.

== Political positions ==
In 2025, Miller proposed legislation that he termed as a "Homeless Bill of Rights" which would protect the right to vote without an address, employment discrimination protections for homeless people, and the right to have personal information and property protected.

== Works cited ==
=== Election reports ===
- "2024 Election Election". Utah. Archived from the original on June 21, 2025.
- "2024 Primary Election" (PDF). Lieutenant Governor of Utah. Archived (PDF) from the original on April 24, 2025.

=== News ===
- Lowell, Jennifer (May 9, 2025). "'It hits home': State's first Palestinian-American lawmaker on conflict between Israel and Gaza". KSL-TV. Archived from the original on June 21, 2025.
- Weaver, Jessica (May 9, 2025). "New council member chosen from 28 who applied to replace Mayor Erin Mendenhall". KJZZ-TV. Archived from the original on June 21, 2025.
- Winslow, Ben (June 18, 2025). "Salt Lake City Police Chief summoned to meet with lawmakers over 'No Kings' shooting". KSTU. Archived from the original on June 21, 2025.
- Winslow, Ben (January 1, 2025). "Utah lawmaker proposes 'Homeless Bill of Rights'". KSTU. Archived from the original on June 21, 2025.

=== Web ===
- "Grant Miller". Utah House Democrats. Archived from the original on June 21, 2025.
- "Grant Amjad Miller". Utah House of Representatives. Archived from the original on June 21, 2025.
- "Meet Grant Amjad Miller". Grant Amjad Miller. Archived from the original on June 21, 2025.
