= Jordan High School (Sandy, Utah) =

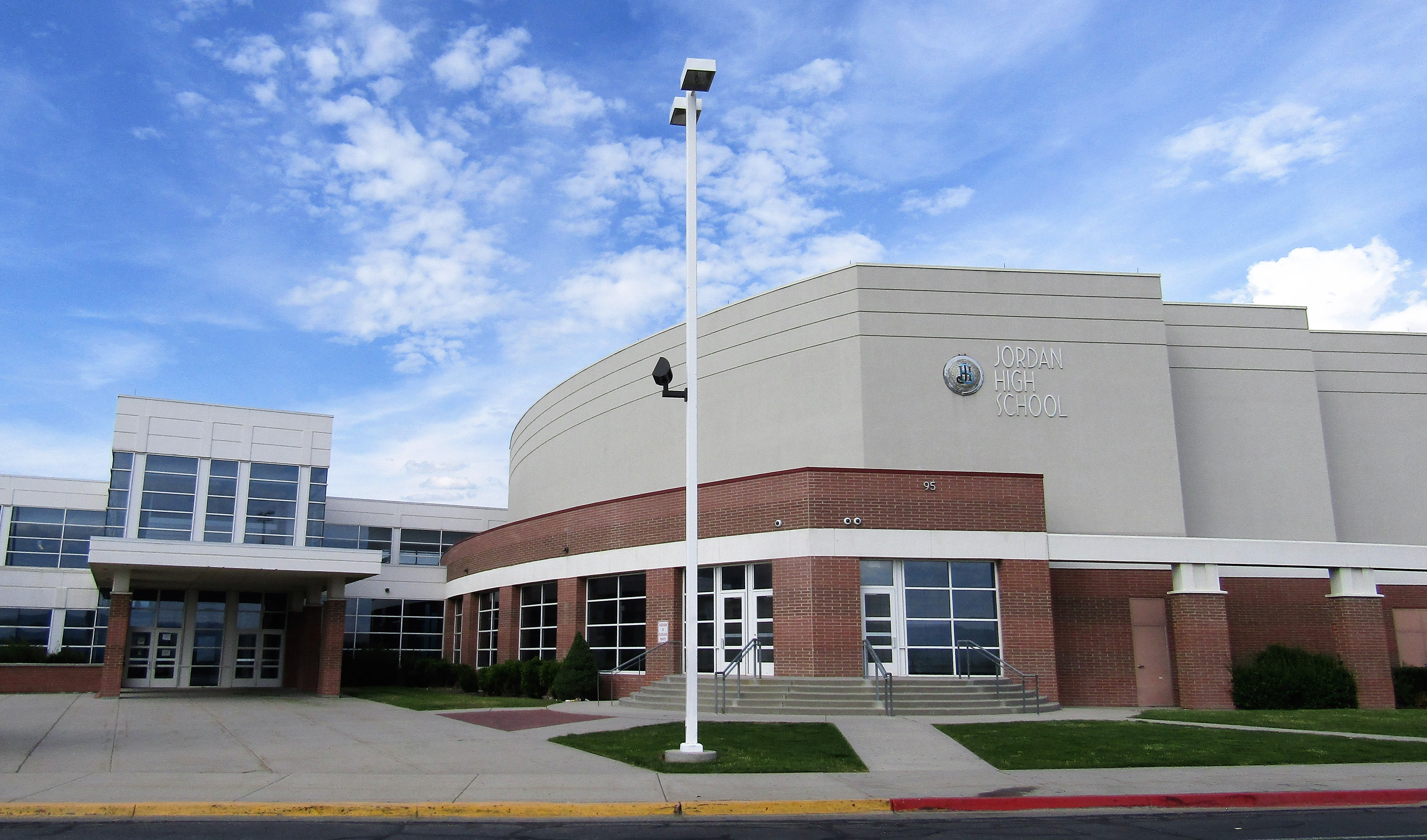

Location
- 95 Beetdigger Blvd, Sandy, UT 84070; 40°34′27″N 111°53′17″W

Information
- Type: Public
- Established: 1907
- School district: Canyons School District
- Principal: Kelcey Kemp
- Teaching staff: 79.19 (FTE)
- Grades: 9-12
- Enrollment: 1,820 (2024-2025)
- Student to teacher ratio: 22.98
- Color: Maroon Gray
- Athletics: Baseball, basketball, cheerleading, cross country, drill team, football, golf, lacrosse, soccer, softball, swimming, tennis, track and field, volleyball, and wrestling
- Athletics conference: UHSAA 4A Region 10
- Mascot: Beetdiggers
- News production: NewsBeet TV
- Website: Official website

Jordan High School (also referred to as Jordan High or JHS ) is a public high school located in Sandy, Utah. It is one of five high schools in the Canyons School District. The school was established in 1907, making it one of the oldest public high schools in the state of Utah.

== Timeline ==
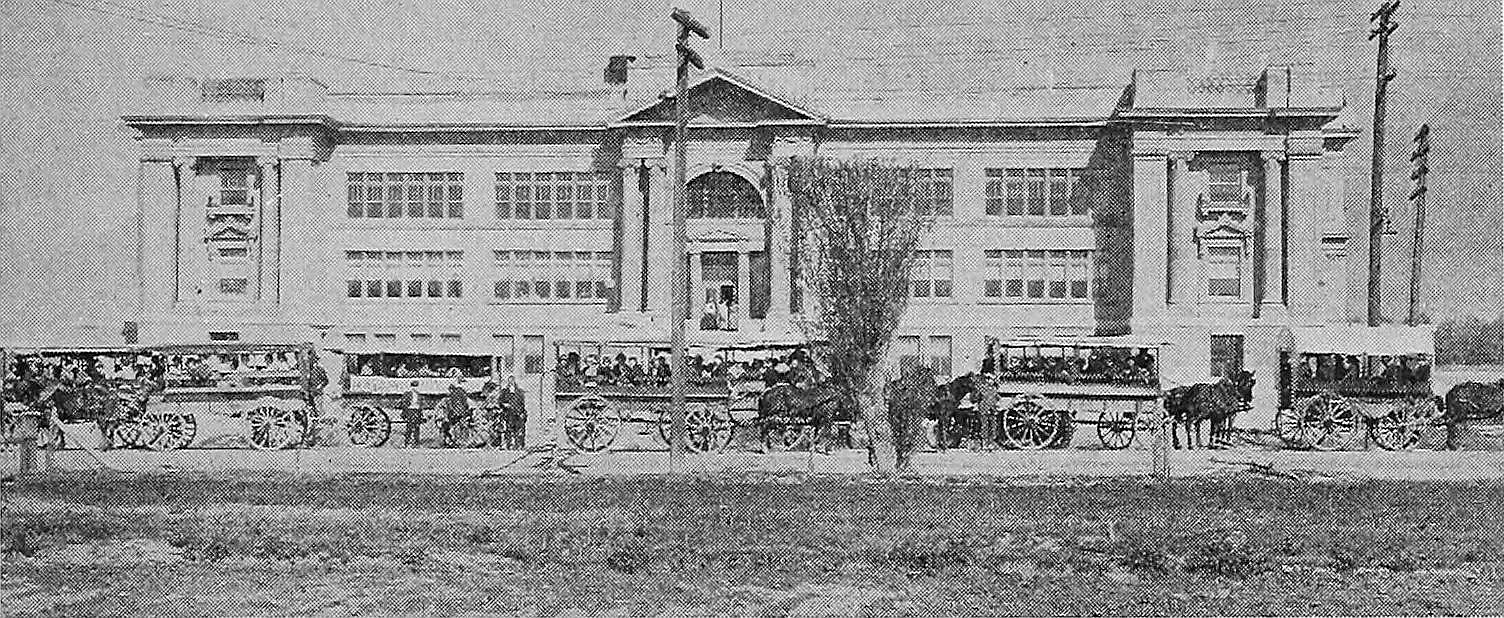
Jordan High School (1920)

=== 1907–1914 ===
Jordan High School took root when a student body of just seven students led by a man named Weston Morley began meeting in the basement of a church in Midvale. His small group started to grow in numbers and its members began to give Morley money. The enrollment numbers quickly grew, and soon it was necessary to move the students and faculty into their first real school building. This original school was initially known as The People's College because it was open to students of all ages. After a year, this small college became a student body of 2,000 students.

=== 1914–1996 ===
A new Jordan High School opened at 9351 South State Street. The original building was on the National Register of Historic Places. Jordan Commons Movie Theatre is now at the old location of Jordan High School.

=== 1996–present ===
The current campus for Jordan High School is at 95 E. Beetdigger Blvd. (9880 S.). It can serve 2,600 students.

== Centennial (2007) ==
The school celebrated its centennial birthday in 2007. This huge two-day event to celebrate 100 years of education at Jordan High took place from 6 July through 7 July 2007.

== Academics ==
Jordan High School offers a wide selection of AP and Honors classes, as well as the ‘Step 2 the U’ program which allows students to take colleges classes at The University of Utah during high school. The average ACT (test) score for Jordan students is 25, and the school's average SAT score is 1150 The school has produced several National Merit Scholar award recipients, finalists and semifinalists as well as Utah State Sterling Scholar finalists.

== Mascot ==
Jordan High School students are known as Beetdiggers. This is due to the fact that large areas once surrounding the school were composed of sugar beet fields. Up until about 1950, at harvest time, classes were usually cancelled during vacations of a week or two in October, which allowed students to assist with the harvest. Their mascot is known as ‘Digger Dan’.

== Notable alumni ==
- Dee Benson - professional soccer player; Federal judge
- Don Fullmer - boxer, contender for World Middleweight Championship
- Gene Fullmer - World Middleweight Boxing Champion, 1957–62
- Hal Hale - professional basketball player
- Andy Jones - professional acrobat; member USA High Diving Team, 2014
- Austin Kafentzis - Utah Mr. Football (2012); MaxPreps National Freshman and Sophomore of the Year; 2012 & 2014 Utah Gatorade Player of the Year; played college football for the BYU Cougars
- Tyler Larsen - NFL football center for the Washington Commanders
- Don Lind - NASA astronaut
- Grant Amjad Miller - Utah state legislator and attorney
- S. Floyd Mori - California state legislator and educator
- Dick Motta - NBA basketball coach; 13th all time in career wins; won the 1978 NBA Finals with the Washington Bullets
- Sean O'Connell (fighter) - former wrestler and football player; professional Mixed Martial Artist
