= Joel Briscoe =

American politician

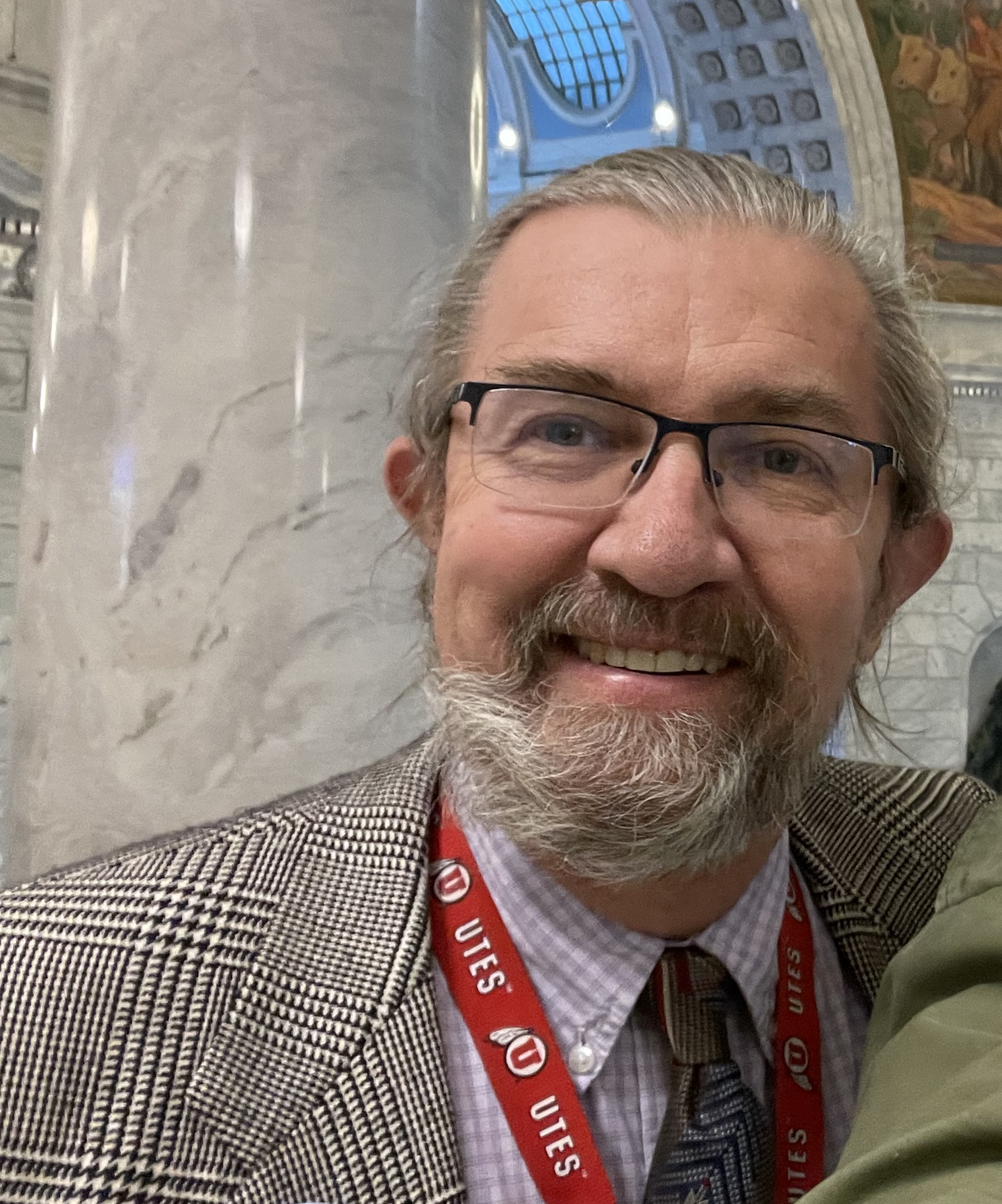

Member of the Utah House of Representatives
- In office July 20, 2010 – December 31, 2024
- Preceded by: Christine Johnson
- Succeeded by: Grant Amjad Miller
- Constituency: 25th district (2010–2023); 24th district (2023–2024)

Personal details
- Party: Democratic
- Spouse: Christine
- Education: University of Utah
- Occupation: Public Education

Joel Briscoe is a former member of the Utah House of Representatives from Utah. A Democrat, he represented District 24 in Salt Lake City.

== Early life and career ==
Briscoe graduated from the University of Utah and taught English, U.S. History, and Civics in secondary schools for twenty-six years, twenty-one of them at Bountiful High School. Briscoe served on the Salt Lake City Board of Education from 1998–2002, the last two years as the Board President. He also served as the chair of the East Central Community Council, a community council located between downtown Salt Lake and the University. In this capacity, Briscoe led community opposition to a proposal to install above-ground high voltage electrical transmission lines through neighborhood yards. He currently lives in Salt Lake City, Utah with his wife Christine and three children.

== Political career ==
Briscoe served on the Salt Lake City Board of Education from 1998–2002, the last two years as the Board President. He also served as the chair of the East Central Community Council, a community council located between downtown Salt Lake and the University of Utah. In this capacity, he led community opposition to a proposal to install above-ground high voltage electrical transmission lines through neighborhood yards.

Briscoe was elected to the Utah House of Representatives on November 2, 2010 and has made education issues a focus of his legislative efforts.

During the 2016 legislative session, Briscoe served as the House Assistant Minority Whip. He served on the Executive Appropriations Committee, the Public Education Appropriations Subcommittee, the House Revenue and Taxation Committee, as well as the House Natural Resources, Agriculture and Environment Committee. During the 2022 legislative session, Briscoe served on the Public Education Appropriations Subcommittee, the House Natural Resources, Agriculture, and Environment Committee, the House Revenue and Taxation Committee, Legislative Process Committee, and the Legislative Water Development Commission.

Briscoe ran for re-election in 2024 but was defeated in the Democratic primary by Grant Amjad Miller.

== Political Positions and Significant Legislation ==
=== Environmental Policy ===
Rep. Briscoe supports policies aimed to limit pollution. He currently served as co-chair of the Clean Air Caucus in the Utah legislature. In 2021, Briscoe said he support government regulations to curb emissions, but also believes that private innovation to help fight emissions, "particularly through public-private partnerships and other incentives, is necessary to developing clean alternatives to our current polluting technology."

In 2022, as part of an effort he believes he will help bring about cleaner air in Utah, Rep. Briscoe sponsored a bill that would make Utah Transit Authority services, including TRAX, the Frontrunner, and buses free throughout Utah. The bill was held in committee.

== 2022 sponsored legislation ==
Bill number	Bill title	Status
HB0164	Public Transit Fares	House/ filed - 3/04/2022
HB0189S03	Electric Vehicle Charging Modifications	House/ filed - 3/04/2022
HB0425	Beer Order and Delivery Amendments	Governor signed - 3/04/2022
HB0430	Municipal Alternate Voting Methods Modifications	House/ filed - 3/04/2022
HB0453	Alcohol Restrictions Amendments	House/ filed - 3/04/2022
HB0464	Utah Clean Energy Fund	House/ filed - 3/04/2022
