= Sione Takitaki =

American football player (born 1995)

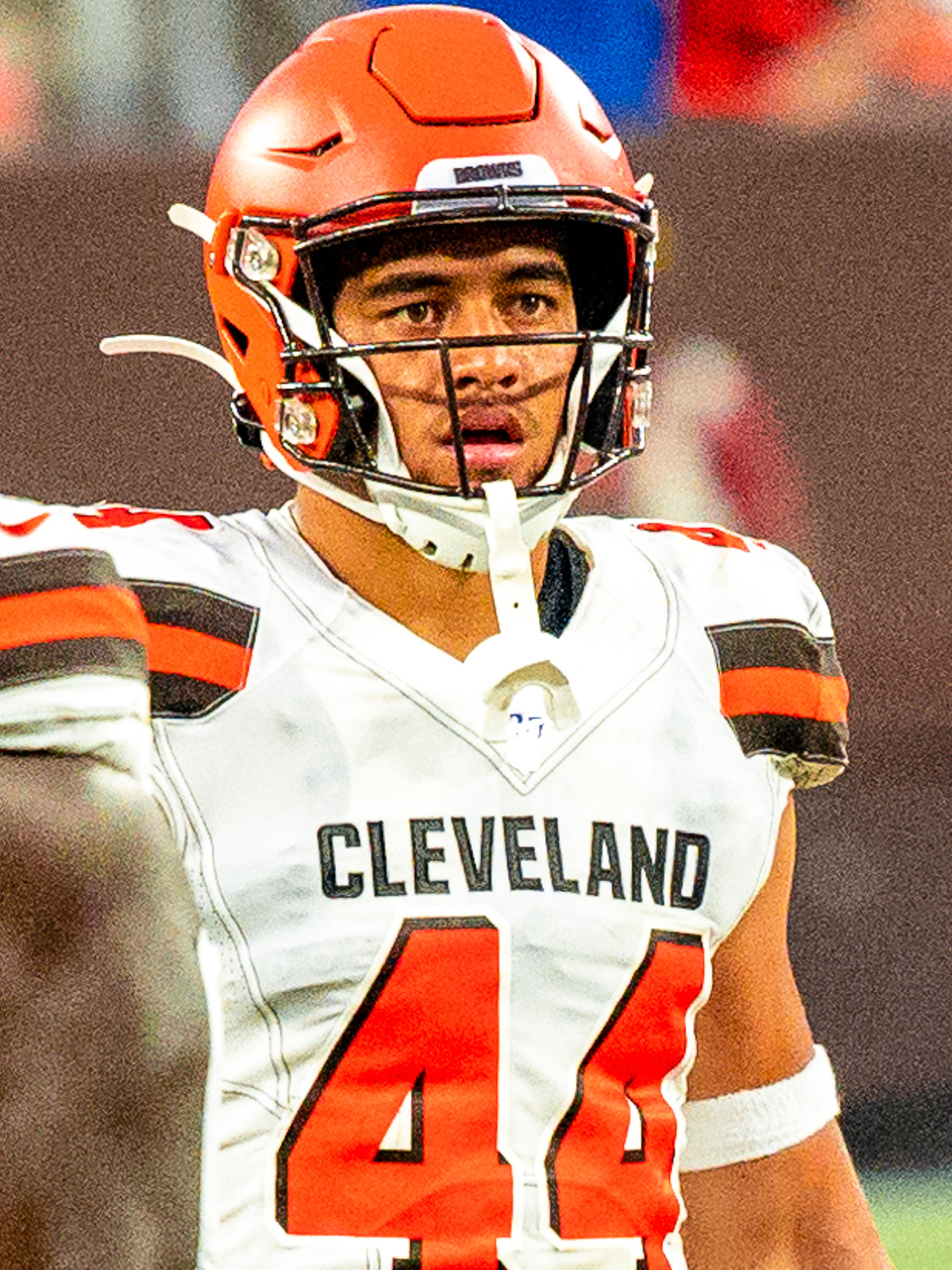
- Takitaki with the Cleveland Browns in 2019

Profile
- Position: Linebacker

Personal information
- Born: June 8, 1995 (age 31); Fontana, California, U.S.
- Listed height: 6 ft 1 in (1.85 m)
- Listed weight: 238 lb (108 kg)

Career information
- High school: Heritage (Romoland, California)
- College: BYU (2014–2018)
- NFL draft: 2019: 3rd round, 80th overall pick

Career history
- Cleveland Browns (2019–2023); New England Patriots (2024); Minnesota Vikings (2025)*; Houston Texans (2026)*
- * Offseason or practice squad member only

Career NFL statistics as of 2024
- Total tackles: 289
- Sacks: 4
- Forced fumbles: 2
- Fumble recoveries: 1
- Pass deflections: 4
- Interceptions: 2
- Defensive touchdowns: 1
- Stats at Pro Football Reference

Sione Takitaki (born June 8, 1995) is an American professional football linebacker. He played college football for the BYU Cougars and was selected by the Cleveland Browns in the third round of the 2019 NFL draft.

== College career ==
Takitaki played college football at BYU from 2014 to 2018. In four seasons with the team, he totaled 237 tackles, including 32.5 tackles for a loss, with 14.5 sacks. As a senior, he served as a team captain and led the Cougars with 118 tackles.

== Professional career ==
Pre-draft measurables
Height	Weight	Arm length	Hand span	Wingspan	40-yard dash	10-yard split	20-yard split	20-yard shuttle	Three-cone drill	Vertical jump	Broad jump	Bench press
6 ft 1 1/8 in (1.86 m)	238 lb (108 kg)	32 in (0.81 m)	9 5/8 in (0.24 m)	6 ft 3 3/8 in (1.91 m)	4.63 s	1.53 s	2.70 s	4.28 s	7.21 s	37.0 in (0.94 m)	10 ft 5 in (3.18 m)	24 reps
All values from NFL Combine

=== Cleveland Browns ===
Takitaki was selected by the Cleveland Browns in the third round with the 80th overall pick in the 2019 NFL draft.

In Week 11 of the 2020 season against the Philadelphia Eagles, Takitaki intercepted a pass thrown by Carson Wentz and returned it 50 yards for a touchdown during the 22–17 win. This was Takitaki's first career interception and touchdown. Takitaki was placed on the reserve/COVID-19 list by the Browns on November 25, 2020, and activated on December 4. In Week 14 against the Baltimore Ravens on Monday Night Football, Takitaki recorded his first career sack on Lamar Jackson during the 47–42 loss.

Takitaki produced the biggest play of his career that season in the AFC Wildcard game against the Pittsburgh Steelers, intercepting a Ben Roethlisberger pass with 3:16 left in the fourth quarter to seal a 48–37 victory.

Takitaki entered the 2022 season as a starting linebacker alongside Anthony Walker Jr. and Jeremiah Owusu-Koramoah. He suffered a torn ACL in Week 13 and was placed on injured reserve on December 7, 2022.

On March 16, 2023, Takitaki signed a one-year contract extension with the Browns.

=== New England Patriots ===
On March 14, 2024, Takitaki signed a two-year contract with the New England Patriots. He was placed on the reserve/PUP list to begin the season. He was activated on October 12. Takitaki was released by the Patriots on February 19, 2025.

=== Minnesota Vikings ===
On September 11, 2025, Takitaki signed with the Minnesota Vikings' practice squad.

=== Houston Texans ===
On August 3, 2026, Takitaki signed with the Houston Texans. He was placed on injured reserve on August 10, due to a hamstring injury. Takitaki was released by the Texans on August 13.

== NFL career statistics ==
Legend
**Bold**	Career high

=== Regular season ===
Year	Team	Games		Tackles					Interceptions						Fumbles	
Year	Team	GP	GS	Comb	Solo	Ast	Sack	TFL	Int	Yards	Avg	Lng	TD	PD	FF	FR
2019	CLE	**15**	1	21	14	7	0.0	0	0	0	0.0	0	0	0	0	0
2020	CLE	**15**	**12**	67	41	26	**1.0**	2	**1**	**50**	**50.0**	**50**	**1**	1	0	0
2021	CLE	**15**	8	44	21	23	0.0	**5**	0	0	0.0	0	0	0	**1**	**1**
2022	CLE	12	8	**71**	36	**35**	1.0	4	0	0	0.0	0	0	0	**1**	0
2023	CLE	**15**	7	65	**45**	20	**2.0**	3	1	0	0.0	0	0	**3**	0	0
2024	NE	11	4	21	7	14	0.0	0	0	0	0.0	0	0	0	0	0
Career		83	40	289	164	125	4.0	14	2	50	25.0	50	1	4	2	1

=== Postseason ===
Year	Team	Games		Tackles					Interceptions						Fumbles	
Year	Team	GP	GS	Comb	Solo	Ast	Sack	TFL	Int	Yards	Avg	Lng	TD	PD	FF	FR
2020	CLE	2	2	8	5	3	0.0	0	1	23	23.0	23	0	1	0	0
2023	CLE	1	1	3	1	2	0.0	0	0	0	0.0	0	0	0	0	0
Career		3	3	11	6	5	0.0	0	1	23	23.0	23	0	1	0	0

== Personal life ==
Takitaki, of Tongan descent, was born to father Vaimaua and mother Fissipeau, the youngest of a family of seven children with four sisters and two brothers. Takitaki married Alyssa Penney on June 14, 2016, in Sacramento, California. They have one child, Zion (b. 2024).

His father died when he was 14. He was raised in the Church of Jesus Christ of Latter-day Saints, with his faith being one of the reasons he chose to attend BYU.
