= Dayan Lake (American football) =

Liberian gridiron football player (born 1997)

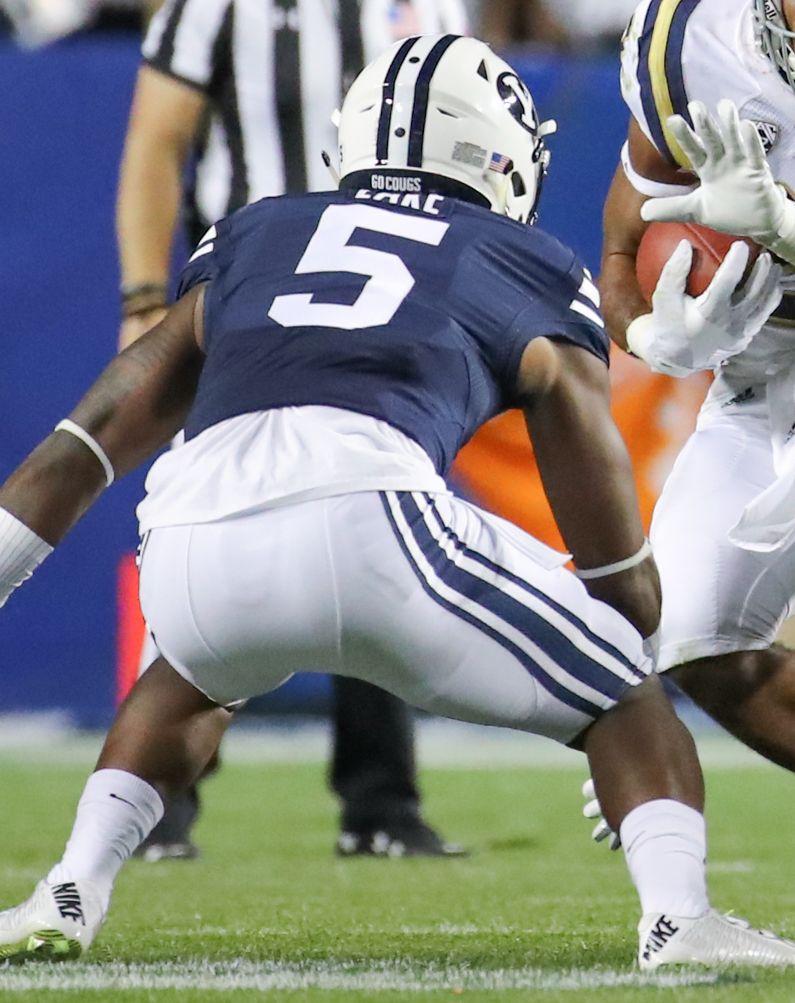
- Lake with the BYU Cougars in 2016

No. 25
- Position: Cornerback / Safety

Personal information
- Born: August 1, 1997 (age 29); Liberia
- Listed height: 5 ft 11 in (1.80 m)
- Listed weight: 200 lb (91 kg)

Career information
- High school: Northridge (Layton, Utah, U.S.)
- College: BYU
- NFL draft: 2020: undrafted

Career history
- Los Angeles Rams (2020)*; New England Patriots (2020)*; Los Angeles Rams (2021)*; Houston Gamblers (2023)
- * Offseason or practice squad member only
- Stats at Pro Football Reference

Dayan Ghanwoloku-Lake (born 1 August 1997) is a Liberian former professional American football defensive back. He signed with the Los Angeles Rams after going undrafted in 2020 while having stints with the New England Patriots. He played college football at Brigham Young University (BYU).

== College career ==
Lake started 43 of 48 games at BYU, compiling 207 career tackles (149 solo), 10.5 tackles for loss (including two sacks), three forced fumbles, and 15 career pass breakups. He finished as BYU's all-time leader in fumble recoveries (seven), second in interception return yards (226), and fourth in interceptions with seven. After his senior season, he participated in the NFLPA Collegiate Bowl.

== Professional career ==
=== Los Angeles Rams (first stint) ===
Lake was signed as an undrafted free agent by the NFL's Los Angeles Rams on 28 April 2020. He was waived during final roster cuts on 4 September 2020.

=== The Spring League ===
Lake was selected by the Conquerors of The Spring League during its player selection draft on 12 October 2020.

=== New England Patriots ===
On 9 December 2020, Lake was signed to the practice squad of the New England Patriots, but was then released 6 days later.

=== Los Angeles Rams (second stint) ===
On 1 June 2021, Lake signed with the Los Angeles Rams. He was waived/injured on 5 August 2021 and placed on injured reserve. On 16 August 2021 Lake was waived with an injury settlement and became a free agent.

=== Houston Gamblers / Roughnecks ===
Lake signed with the Houston Gamblers of the USFL on 22 November 2022.

Lake and all other Houston Gamblers players and coaches were all transferred to the Houston Roughnecks after it was announced that the Gamblers took on the identity of their XFL counterpart, the Roughnecks. He was released on March 10, 2024.

== Personal life ==
Lake was born in Liberia. At the age of five, he traveled with his older sister, Yassah, to the United States where his father's new wife took care of them while their father played soccer at BYU-Hawaii.
