= Nuʻu Tafisi =

American football player and coach (born 1981)

Current position
- Title: Strength & Conditioning coach
- Team: San Jose State

Playing career
- 2003–2004: Mt. San Antonio
- 2005–2006: California
- 2007–2009: Seattle Seahawks
- Position: Defensive end

Coaching career (HC unless noted)
- 2011: Boise State (GA/S&C)
- 2012–2014: Utah (assistant S&C)
- 2015: USC (assistant S&C)
- 2016–2022: BYU (Director S&C)
- 2024–present: San Jose State (S&C)

Accomplishments and honors

Awards
- JUCO All-American (2004); 2× Second-team All-Pac-10 (2005–2006)

Nu'u Tafisi (/ˈnuːʔuː təˈfiːsiː/; is an American former football defensive end for the Seattle Seahawks of the National Football League (NFL) who is the strength & conditioning coach at San Jose State. He was originally signed by the Seahawks as an undrafted free agent in 2007. He played college football at California & Mt. San Antonio College (Mt. SAC).

== Playing career ==
Born in Western Samoa, Tafisi attended East High School in Salt Lake City, Utah. At Mt. San Antonio College, he was a JC Gridwire second-team All-American. In the 2004 season, Tafisi had 59 tackles, including 16 sacks and 23 solo tackles, and the team finished with an 8–3 record.

He started 24 of 25 games in his two years at the University of California, Berkeley after transferring from Mt. San Antonio. A second-team All-Pac-10 selection, Tafisi earned the team's Joe Roth Award (for courage, attitude and sportsmanship) in his senior year. He posted 32 tackles, 12 of which were solo, and 5.5 sacks in his final season. He debuted at Cal with 38 tackles, 30 of which were solo, and 3.5 sacks. After college he played for the Seattle Seahawks from 2007 to 2009.

== Coaching career ==
After working as an assistant strength and conditioning coach from 2011 to 2015, Tafisi was hired by Kalani Sitake as the head strength and conditioning coach at BYU.

Tafisi joined San Jose State in 2024 as their strength & conditioning coach.
