= Austin Kafentzis =

American football player (born 1996)

No. 24
- Position: Linebacker

Personal information
- Born: April 10, 1996 (age 30); Sandy, Utah, U.S.
- Listed height: 6 ft 1 in (1.85 m)
- Listed weight: 207 lb (94 kg)

Career information
- High school: Jordan (Sandy, Utah)
- College: BYU (2017–2019)

Awards and highlights
- MaxPreps HS National Freshman of the Year; MaxPreps HS National Sophomore of the Year; USA Today HS All-American Second Team (2012); 2012 & 2014 Utah Gatorade Player of the Year; Utah Mr. Football (2012); 2014 Utah Football Player of the Year for The Salt Lake Tribune all class football team; 2014 POY for KSL; 2014 academic Utah HOF inductee; First and only high school player in the U.S. to have 100 rushing and passing TD's in a career; First and only high school player to hold his own states record in rushing yards (6,942) and passing yards (13,079); Holds national record for Passing TD's in a quarter with (5); One of only 2 players (Maty Mauk) in high school to have over 20,000 yards in total offense; Holds 20 Utah state records in football; Holds javelin record in Utah 217′ 9½″; won state in the javelin 3 times and was 25–1 in competition in high school; with only one throw in college as an early enroll freshman with Wisconsin, Kafentzis threw the javelin 203' to have the 3rd best throw of all-time at Wisconsin with the new javelin
- Stats at ESPN

Austin Kafentzis (born April 10, 1996) is an American former college football linebacker who played for the BYU Cougars.

== High school ==
As a Freshman at Jordan High School in Sandy, Utah, he led the Jordan Beetdiggers to the 5A state semifinals, where he broke his collarbone. He threw for 3,199 yards on the season, ran for 1,377 yards and was responsible for 45 touchdowns that season. His total offensive yardage placed him at fifth all-time in Utah state history. Kafentzis and his teammates were invited to ESPN's 7-on-7 tournament, an honor no other Utah school had ever accomplished. As a freshman Kafentzis was a first-team all-state player and was named the MaxPreps High School Freshman of the Year. Sports Illustrated named him as a "Future Game Changer."

As a sophomore Kafentzis led the Beetdiggers to a 5A state title with 3,018 yards passing and 32 touchdowns, while rushing for 1,884 yards and 26 touchdowns. Kafentzis was named the MaxPreps National Sophomore of the Year and the 2012 and 2014 Utah Gatorade Player of the Year.

Kafentzis is the only four-time 1st team unanimous all-state selection at any position in the history of Utah high school football. There have been two three time 1st team selections in the history of Utah high school football.

In addition to his football accomplishments, Kafentzis also holds the Utah Class 5A records for the Javelin throw (217' 9 1/2"), breaking the previous records as a high school freshman. Kafentzis is also a three-time state champ in the javelin (freshman, sophomore, and junior, did not compete as a senior to enroll early at Wisconsin for football).

=== High school stats ===
Year	Team	Pass completions	Pass attempts	Completion %	Pass yards	Pass avg	Pass TDs	INT	Rush attempts	Rush yards	Rush avg	Rush TDs
2011	Jordan High School	212	366	57.9%	3,188	245.2	23	19	210	1377	105.9	22
2012	Jordan High School	200	313	63.9%	3018	215.6	32	12	237	1884	134.6	26
2013	Jordan High School	191	380	50.3%	3,011	231.6	20	18	272	1839	141.5	30
2014	Jordan High School	221	394	56.0%	3,862	321.8	40	14	273	1842	153.5	25
High school totals		824	1453	56.7%	13,079	251.5	115	63	992	6942	133.5	103

== Recruiting ==
At the conclusion of his Freshman season Kafentzis was offered a scholarship to play for BYU. By the end of his sophomore season he held offers from BYU, Utah State, Utah, Hawaii, and Wisconsin. He gave a verbal commitment to play football at Wisconsin on June 18, 2013.

College recruiting
Name	Hometown	School	Height	Weight	40^{‡}	Commit date
Austin Kafentzis; QB	Sandy, Utah	Jordan High School	6 ft 1 in (1.85 m)	207 lb (94 kg)	4.42	Jun 18, 2013
Austin Kafentzis; QB	Recruit ratings: Scout: Rivals: 247Sports: ESPN: (80)					
Overall recruit ranking: Scout: 54 (QB) Rivals: NR ESPN: 15 (Dual Threat QB)
Note: In many cases, Scout, Rivals, 247Sports, On3, and ESPN may conflict in their listings of height and weight.; In these cases, the average was taken. ESPN grades are on a 100-point scale.; Sources: "Rivals.com". Rivals.; "Scout.com". Scout.; "ESPN". ESPN.; "Scout.com Team Recruiting Rankings". Scout.; "2015 Team Ranking". Rivals.com.

== Collegiate career ==
Kafentzis graduated early from Jordan and enrolled in the spring semester at University of Wisconsin in January 2015. However, following spring training Kafenzis announced he would be transferring from the university. On June 10 it was announced that Kafentzis had enrolled at the University of Nevada. Due to transfer rules Kafentzis was not eligible to play for the 2015 season, however he will have four years of eligibility remaining.

== Records ==
=== High school ===
Kafentzis owns 15 Utah state football records.

Career records

1. Total Offense (20,121)
2. Rushing Yards (6,942)
3. Rushing Touchdowns (103)
4. Touchdowns (scored by rushing, receiving and all returns) (118)
5. Carries (992)
6. 100-yard Games (38)
7. Passing Yards (13,079)
8. TD passes (115)
9. Pass Attempts (1,453)
10. Pass Completions (821)
11. TDs Responsible For (218; 103 rush, 115 pass )
12. Points Scored in a career (618)
13. Total yards per game in a season (475.58)
14. 200 yard rushing games in a career (10)
15. Most consecutive 100 yard rushing games (18) 2013 and 2014 seasons
16. Wins as a QB (38)

Single-game records

1. Total Offense - 694 (10/15/2014 vs. Brighton)
2. Touchdown Passes - 8 (9/21/12 vs. Copper Hills, tied with Alex Hart)
3. Single-game TDs responsible for - 10 (4 rush, 6 pass; 10/15/14 vs. Brighton, tied with Adam Boelter and Gene Livingston)
4. Most TD's in a quarter (5), also national record
