= Micah Hannemann =

American football player (born 1994)

No. 35, 27
- Position: Safety

Personal information
- Born: August 15, 1994 (age 32); Laie, Hawaii, U.S.
- Listed height: 6 ft 0 in (1.83 m)
- Listed weight: 190 lb (86 kg)

Career information
- High school: Lone Peak (Highland, Utah)
- College: BYU
- NFL draft: 2018: undrafted

Career history
- Cleveland Browns (2018)*; Los Angeles Chargers (2018)*; Salt Lake Stallions (2019); Tampa Bay Vipers (2020)
- * Offseason or practice squad member only

Micah Hannemann (born August 15, 1994) is an American former football safety. He played college football at Brigham Young. He is the brother of professional baseball player Jacob Hannemann.

== Professional career ==
=== Cleveland Browns ===
Hannemann was signed by the Cleveland Browns as an undrafted free agent on April 28, 2018. He was waived on August 18, 2018.

=== Los Angeles Chargers ===
On August 19, 2018, Hannemann was claimed off waivers by the Los Angeles Chargers. He was waived on September 1, 2018.

=== Salt Lake Stallions ===
On December 22, 2018, Hannemann signed with the Salt Lake Stallions of the Alliance of American Football. The league ceased operations in April 2019.

=== Tampa Bay Vipers ===
Hannermann was drafted in the sixth round during phase four in the 2020 XFL Draft by the Tampa Bay Vipers. He had his contract terminated when the league suspended operations on April 10, 2020.
