= Tejan Koroma =

American football player (born 1996)

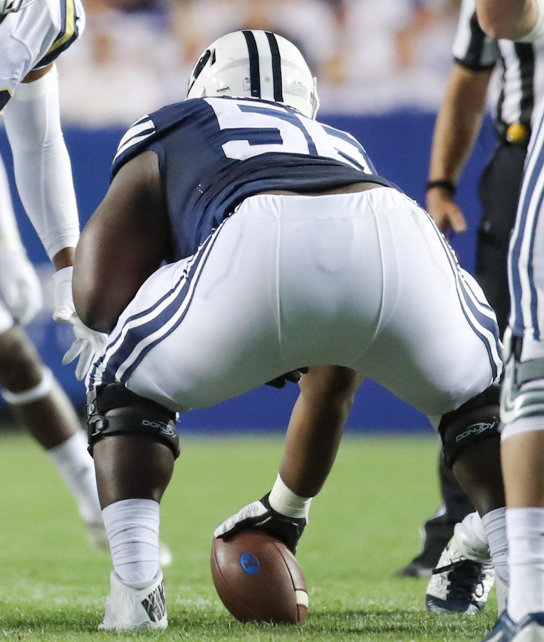
- Koroma with the BYU Cougars in 2016

No. 56
- Position: Center

Personal information
- Born: April 27, 1996 (age 30); Dallas, Texas, U.S.
- Listed height: 6 ft 0 in (1.83 m)
- Listed weight: 290 lb (132 kg)

Career information
- High school: Allen (Allen, Texas)
- College: BYU
- NFL draft: 2018: undrafted

Career history
- Kansas City Chiefs (2018); Houston Roughnecks (2020); TSL Jousters (2021); Michigan Panthers (2022); Seattle Sea Dragons (2023)
- Stats at Pro Football Reference

Tejan Koroma (born April 27, 1996) is an American former professional football center. He played college football at Brigham Young University.

== Professional career ==
=== Kansas City Chiefs ===
Koroma was signed by the Kansas City Chiefs as an undrafted free agent on May 7, 2018. He was waived with an injury designation on August 5, 2018. After going unclaimed, he was placed on injured reserve by the Chiefs. He was waived on April 29, 2019.

=== Houston Roughnecks ===
Koroma was selected by the Houston Roughnecks in the 2020 XFL Supplemental Draft on November 22, 2019. He had his contract terminated when the league suspended operations on April 10, 2020.

=== Michigan Panthers ===
On March 10, 2022, Koroma was drafted by the Michigan Panthers of the United States Football League.

=== Seattle Sea Dragons ===
The Seattle Sea Dragons selected Koroma in the seventh round of the 2023 XFL Supplemental Draft on January 1, 2023. The Sea Dragons folded when the XFL and USFL merged to create the United Football League (UFL).
