= Tristen Hoge =

American football player (born 1997)

Profile
- Position: Guard

Personal information
- Born: April 23, 1997 (age 29); Pocatello, Idaho, U.S.
- Listed height: 6 ft 5 in (1.96 m)
- Listed weight: 270 lb (122 kg)

Career information
- High school: Highland (Pocatello)
- College: Notre Dame (2015–2016); BYU (2017–2020)
- NFL draft: 2021: undrafted

Career history
- New York Jets (2021)*; Cleveland Browns (2021)*; Denver Broncos (2021)*
- * Offseason or practice squad member only

Awards and highlights
- 2015 U.S. Army All-American Bowl

Tristen Hoge (born May 23, 1997) in Pocatello, Idaho is an American former football player. He played college football for the BYU Cougars from 2017 to 2020 after transferring from the Notre Dame Fighting Irish.

== High school ==
Hoge attended Highland High School where he was a highly-touted offensive lineman and won the Gatorade Player of the Year award twice for Idaho. He was ranked as the number one center in the nation. Hoge was also named to the 2014 American First-team and played in the 2015 U.S. Army All-American Bowl.

== College career ==
Hoge received offers from Stanford, Florida, Penn State, Michigan State, LSU, Boise State and BYU, before committing to Notre Dame. He played two years at Notre Dame and was chosen as the 2015 Notre Dame Offensive Scout Team Player of the Year, before playing six games in 2016.

Hoge transferred to BYU in 2017 and had to sit out the year due to NCAA transfer rules. He would go on to play in and start 13 games at right guard, but only managed 5 games in 2019 due to a leg injury. Unfortunately, Hoge contracted COVID-19 and pneumonia, limiting him to 8 games in 2020.

== Professional career ==
=== New York Jets ===
After going undrafted in the 2021 NFL draft, Hoge signed with the New York Jets on May 7, 2021. Hoge was waived by the Jets on August 24, 2021.

=== Cleveland Browns ===
Hoge was signed to the Cleveland Browns practice squad on September 20, 2021. He was released on December 7.

=== Denver Broncos ===
On December 28, 2021, Hoge was signed to the Denver Broncos' practice squad.

== Personal life ==
Hoge is the nephew of former Pittsburgh Steelers running back and ESPN analyst Merril Hoge. He is also cousin to former BYU quarterback Beau Hoge, who played from 2015 and 2018. On April 21, 2021 he married Heidi Hoge. He currently works as a film and television actor in Texas.
