= James Empey =

American football player (born 1996)

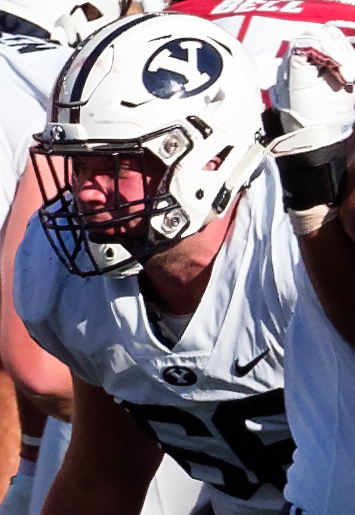
- Empey with BYU in 2018

Profile
- Position: Center

Personal information
- Born: October 27, 1996 (age 30); American Fork, Utah, U.S.
- Listed height: 6 ft 3 in (1.91 m)
- Listed weight: 297 lb (135 kg)

Career information
- High school: American Fork (American Fork, Utah)
- College: BYU
- NFL draft: 2022: undrafted

Career history
- Dallas Cowboys (2022)*; Miami Dolphins (2022); Tennessee Titans (2023)*; Green Bay Packers (2023)*; Tennessee Titans (2023)*
- * Offseason or practice squad member only
- Stats at Pro Football Reference

James Empey (born October 27, 1996) is an American former football center. He played college football at BYU.

== Early life ==
Empey grew up in American Fork, Utah, and attended American Fork High School. Empey committed and signed to play college football at the University of Utah. After graduating from American Fork and prior to attending BYU, he served a 2-year mission for The Church of Jesus Christ of Latter-day Saints in Lisbon, Portugal. Upon returning from his mission, Empey began his college career with Brigham Young University (BYU) where his father was an assistant coach at the time.

== College career ==
Empey redshirted his true freshman season at BYU after returning from his mission. He became the Cougars' starting center going into his redshirt freshman season and started every game he played for them over the next four years. He was a Freshman All-American selection. Empey declared for the NFL Draft with one year of eligibility left.

== Professional career ==
Pre-draft measurables
Height	Weight	Arm length	Hand span	40-yard dash	10-yard split	20-yard split	20-yard shuttle	Three-cone drill	Vertical jump	Broad jump	Bench press
6 ft 3 1/2 in (1.92 m)	297 lb (135 kg)	32 1/2 in (0.83 m)	9 5/8 in (0.24 m)	5.43 s	1.89 s	3.16 s	4.71 s	7.71 s	25.5 in (0.65 m)	8 ft 3 in (2.51 m)	23 reps
All values from Pro Day

=== Dallas Cowboys ===
After going undrafted in the 2022 NFL draft, Empey signed with the Dallas Cowboys on April 30, 2022. Empey was waived by the Cowboys on August 28, 2022.

=== Miami Dolphins ===
Empey was signed to the Miami Dolphins practice squad on September 1, 2022. He was added to the active roster on December 3, 2022.

=== Tennessee Titans ===
Empey signed with the Tennessee Titans on May 15, 2023. He was waived on July 28.

=== Green Bay Packers ===
Empey was claimed off waivers from the Titans on July 31, 2023, by the Green Bay Packers. After being released at the end of training camp, he signed to the team's practice squad. Empey was released on September 1, 2023.

=== Tennessee Titans (second stint) ===
On December 19, 2023, Empey was signed to the Titans practice squad. He was not signed to a reserve/future contract and thus became a free agent when his contract expired at the end of the season.
