= 2019 BYU Cougars football team =

American college football season

2019 BYU Cougars football

Hawaii Bowl, L 34–38 vs. Hawaii
- Conference: Independent
- Record: 7–6
- Head coach: Kalani Sitake (4th season)
- Offensive coordinator: Jeff Grimes (2nd season)
- Offensive scheme: Power spread
- Defensive coordinator: Ilaisa Tuiaki (4th season)
- Base defense: 4–3
- Home stadium: LaVell Edwards Stadium

2019 NCAA Division I FBS independents football records
	Conf.			Overall
Team	W		L	W		L
No. 12 Notre Dame		–		11	–	2
Liberty		–		8	–	5
BYU		–		7	–	6
Army		–		5	–	8
New Mexico State		–		2	–	10
UMass		–		1	–	11
Rankings from AP Poll

The 2019 BYU Cougars football team represented Brigham Young University in the 2019 NCAA Division I FBS football season. The Cougars were led by fourth-year head coach Kalani Sitake, and played their home games at LaVell Edwards Stadium. This was the eighth year that BYU competed as an NCAA Division I FBS independent.

== Before the season ==
=== Coaching changes ===
On January 14, 2019, Ryan Pugh was announced as the new offensive coordinator at Troy leaving a vacancy on BYU's offensive staff. On February 14, 2019, Eric Mateos was named the offensive line coach.

=== 2019 recruits ===
Name	Pos.	Height	Weight	Hometown	Notes
Brooks Maile	DL	6'4"	285	St. George, Utah	Mission prior to enrolling
Jacob Conover	QB	6'1"	205	Chandler, Arizona	Mission prior to enrolling
Keanu Hill	WR	6'3"	190	Euless, Texas	
Carter Wheat	TE	6'4"	225	Mesa, Arizona	
Blake Freeland	OL	6'8"	260	Herriman, Utah	
Bruce Mitchell	DL	6'4"	265	Kamas, Utah	Mission prior to enrolling
Ethan Erickson	TE	6'4"	265	Kahuku, Hawaii	Mission prior to enrolling
Michael Daley	LB	6'3"	220	Highland, Utah	Mission prior to enrolling
Chase Roberts	WR	6'4"	195	American Fork, Utah	Mission prior to enrolling
Brock Gunderson	OL	6'4"	265	Cypress, Texas	Mission prior to enrolling
George Udo	DB	6'1"	210	Walnut Creek, California	
Eli Unutoa	OL	6'5"	290	Kapa'a, Hawaii	Mission prior to enrolling
Cade Albright	DL	6'5"	215	San Juan Capistrano, California	Mission prior to enrolling
Javelle Brown	WR	6'1"	180	San Diego, California	
Luc Andrada	RB	5'10"	175	Pueblo, Colorado	
Kimball Henstrom	DB	6'0"	170	Draper, Utah	
Tevita Gagnier	DB	6'1"	170	Tooele, Utah	
Masen Wake	RB	6'1"	235	Cedar Hills, Utah	
Chapman Beaird	RB	6'3"	200	Franklin, Tennessee	

=== 2018 returned missionaries ===
Name	Pos.	Height	Weight	Year	Notes
Chaz Ah You	LB	6'2"	205	Sophomore	
Solofa Funa	LB	6'2"	245	Freshman	
Caden Haws	OL	6'2"	315	Freshman	
Freddy Livai	DL	6'4"	256	Freshman	
Jake Oldroyd	K	6'1"	170	Freshman	
Keenan Pili	LB	6'2"	215	Freshman	
Hayden Livingston	DB	6'1"	185	Freshman	
Ammon Hannemann	DB	6'2"	190	Freshman	
Seleti Fevaleaki	DL	6'3"	290	Freshman	
Ben Bywater	LB	6'3"	210	Freshman	
Jackson McChesney	RB	6'0"	187	Freshman	
Alema Pilimai	TE	6'4"	205	Freshman	
Isaac Rex	TE	6'5"	235	Freshman	
Talmage Gunther	WR	6'0"	195	Freshman	
Rhett Reilly	QB	6'2"	175	Sophomore	
Brayden Keim	OL	6'7"	259	Freshman	
Tevita Ika	WR	5'8"	160	Freshman	
Brevan Ward	OL	6'5"	270	Sophomore	
Will Watanabe	DB	5'10"	175	Freshman	
Gabe Summers	DL	6'2"	250	Sophomore	
Jacob Talbot	WR	6'3"	205	Sophomore	
Kade Pupunu	LB	6'3"	205	Freshman	
Britton Hogan	DS	6'3"	220	Freshman	
Chase Wester	RB	5'11"	195	Sophomore	
Jacob Boren	WR	5'9"	180	Freshman	
Dallin Lee	DB	6'2"	200	Freshman	

=== 2019 other additions ===
Name	Pos.	Height	Weight	Year	Notes
Spencer Romney	WR	5'10"	180	Sophomore	Transfer from Snow College
Emmanuel Esukpa	RB	5'11"	232	Senior	Transfer from Rice University
Ty'Son Williams	RB	6'0"	219	Senior	Transfer from University of South Carolina
Mo Unutoa	OL	6'5"	304	Sophomore	Transfer from University of Utah
Shamon Willis	DB	5'10"	180	Freshman	Transfer from Weber State University
Pepe Tanuvasa	LB	6'1"	226	Sophomore	Transfer from Naval Academy
Dimitri Gallow	DB	6'0"	190	Junior	Transfer from Mt. San Jacinto College
Alec Wyble-Meza	RB	5'11"	195	Sophomore	Transfer from Scottsdale Community College
Batchlor Johnson IV	WR	5'9"	160	Senior	Transfer from University of Utah
Alex Miskela	LB	6'1"	240	Freshman	Originally Signed 2018
Joe Tukuafu	OL	6'4"	275	Sophomore	Return after sitting out 2018
Beau Tanner	DB	6'0"	189	Senior	Return after sitting out 2018
Sam Baldwin	LB	6'3"	205	Senior	Return after sitting out 2018
Nephi Stevens	WR	5'11"	190	Senior	Return after sitting out 2018

=== 2019 departures ===
Name	Pos.	Height	Weight	Year	Notes
Rhett Almond	P	6'4"	200	Senior	Graduation
Squally Canada	RB	5'11"	210	Senior	Graduation
Dylan Collie	WR	5'10"	180	Senior	Graduation
Brayden El-Bakri	RB	6'0"	245	Senior	Graduation
Matt Foley	LS	6'1"	210	Senior	Graduation
Gavin Fowler	DB	6'0"	191	Senior	Graduation
Matt Hadley	RB	6'0"	210	Senior	Graduation
Austin Hoyt	OL	6'8"	315	Senior	Graduation
Tanner Jacobson	DB	5'10"	185	Senior	Graduation
Kamalani Kaluhiokalani	DL	6'0"	290	Senior	Graduation
Corbin Kaufusi	DL	6'9"	275	Senior	Graduation
Ului Lapuaho	OL	6'7"	330	Senior	Graduation
Tanner Mangum	QB	6'3"	205	Senior	Graduation
Andrew Mikkelsen	K	6'0"	200	Senior	Graduation
Butch Pau'u	LB	6'0"	225	Senior	Graduation
Riggs Powell	LB	6'2"	220	Senior	Graduation
Adam Pulsipher	LB	6'1"	220	Senior	Graduation
Nate Sampson	LB	6'2"	230	Senior	Graduation
Rhett Sandlin	LB	6'3"	230	Senior	Graduation
Michael Shelton	DB	5'8"	175	Senior	Graduation
Sione Takitaki	LB	6'2"	230	Senior	Graduation
Merrill Taliauli	DL	6'2"	310	Senior	Graduation
Langi Tuifua	DL	6'3"	235	Sophomore	Medical
Motekiai Langi	DL	6'7"	400	Sophomore	Medical
Benjamin Ward	TE	6'5"	235	Freshman	LDS mission
Dallin Holker	TE	6'5"	225	Freshman	LDS mission
Michael Thorson	OL	6'5"	290	Freshman	LDS mission
Jaylen Vickers	DB	5'10"	183	Freshman	LDS mission
Akile Davis	WR	6'2"	205	Junior	Transfer
Isaiah Armstrong	DB	6'2"	195	Junior	Transfer
Riley Burt	RB	6'1"	210	Junior	Transfer
Jacob Jimenez	OL	6'5"	305	Junior	Transfer
Tevita Mo'unga	DL	6'3"	340	Junior	Transfer
Johnny Tapusoa	RB	5'10"	225	Sophomore	Transfer
Christian Folau	LB	6'1"	237	Freshman	
Wayne Tei-Kirby	DL	6'3"	315	Sophomore	
Stacy Conner	QB	6'6"	190	Freshman	
Trevion Greene	DB	6'3"	194	Junior	
Michael Bruno	OL	6'5"	240	Freshman	
Brach Davis	DB	6'1"	170	Freshman	
Michael Biagi	LB	6'3"	205	Freshman	
Tanner Leishman	TE	6'6"	245	Freshman	
Joshua Buhler	DB	6'1"	205	Junior	
Inoke Lotulelei	WR	5'9"	190	Sophomore	
Brock Bastian	LB	6'2"	205	Freshman	
Austin McChesney	DB	6'1"	180	Sophomore	
Hayden Griffitts	QB	6'2"	205	Sophomore	
AJ Lolohea	LB	6'3"	235	Freshman	
Beau Hoge	RB	6'1"	209	Junior	
Hirkley Latu	DL	6'3"	240	Freshman	

== Schedule ==
Following their win over Idaho State on November 16, the Cougars accepted an invitation to the 2019 Hawaii Bowl.

Date	Time	Opponent	Site	TV	Result	Attendance
August 29	8:15 p.m.	No. 14 Utah	LaVell Edwards Stadium; Provo, UT (Beehive Boot & Holy War)	ESPN	L 12–30	61,626
September 7	5:00 p.m.	at Tennessee	Neyland Stadium; Knoxville, TN	ESPN	W 29–26 ^{2OT}	92,475
September 14	1:30 p.m.	No. 24 USC	LaVell Edwards Stadium; Provo, UT	ABC	W 30–27 ^{OT}	62,546
September 21	1:30 p.m.	No. 22 Washington	LaVell Edwards Stadium; Provo, UT	ABC/ESPN2	L 19–45	62,117
September 28	10:00 a.m.	at Toledo	Glass Bowl; Toledo, OH	ESPN+	L 21–28	24,889
October 12	1:30 p.m.	at South Florida	Raymond James Stadium; Tampa, FL	CBSSN	L 23–27	35,375
October 19	8:15 p.m.	No. 14 Boise State^{†}	LaVell Edwards Stadium; Provo, UT	ESPN2	W 28–25	58,930
November 2	8:00 p.m.	at Utah State	Maverik Stadium; Logan, UT (Beehive Boot & The Old Wagon Wheel)	ESPN2	W 42–14	25,472
November 9	5:30 p.m.	Liberty	LaVell Edwards Stadium; Provo, UT	ESPNU	W 31–24	54,683
November 16	1:00 p.m.	Idaho State	LaVell Edwards Stadium; Provo, UT	BYUtv	W 42–10	57,379
November 23	10:00 a.m.	at UMass	Warren McGuirk Alumni Stadium; Amherst, MA	NESN/FloSports	W 56–24	8,204
November 30	7:00 p.m.	at San Diego State	SDCCU Stadium; San Diego, CA	CBSSN	L 3–13	28,180
December 24	6:00 p.m.	at Hawaii	Aloha Stadium; Honolulu, HI (Hawaii Bowl)	ESPN	L 34–38	21,582
^{†}Homecoming; Rankings from AP Poll released prior to the game; All times are in Mountain time

== Game summaries ==
=== Utah ===
Utah at BYU

Team	1	2	3	4	Total
• No. 14/15 Utes	3	6	7	14	30
Cougars	0	6	0	6	12

- Date: August 29
- Location: LaVell Edwards Stadium
  Provo, Utah
- Game start: 8:25 p.m. MDT
- Elapsed time: 3:55
- Game attendance: 61,626
- Game weather: 85 °F (29 °C), Winds NE 4 mph; Partly Cloudy; Thunderstorms
- Referee: Chris Coyte • Umpire: Bryan Hay • Linesman: Darryl Johnson • Line judge: Jeff Robinson • Back judge: Steve Steichen • Field judge: Steve Currie • Side judge: Jeff Dahle • Center judge: Jim Wharrie
- TV announcers (ESPN (before delay)/ESPN2 (after delay)): Anish Shroff, Ahmad Brooks, and Kris Budden

Uniform combination: white helmet, royal blue jersey, white pants w/ royal blue accents.

- There was a 58-minute weather delay during the fourth quarter (Thunderstorms).

Scoring summary

Quarter	Time	Drive			Team	Scoring information	Score	
Quarter	Time	Plays	Yards	TOP	Team	Scoring information	UTAH	BYU
1	8:07	9	37	4:34	UTAH	41-yard field goal by Andrew Strauch	3	0
2	14:15	12	59	3:54	BYU	32-yard field goal by Jake Oldroyd	3	3
2	10:17				UTAH	Interception returned 58 yards for touchdown by Francis Bernard, Andrew Strauch kick failed	9	3
2	5:52	9	55	4:25	BYU	37-yard field goal by Jake Oldroyd	9	6
3	9:47	11	75	5:13	UTAH	Jaylen Dixon 2-yard touchdown run, Andrew Strauch kick good	16	6
4	12:56	3	22	1:09	UTAH	Jaylen Dixon 2-yard touchdown run, Jason Redding kick good	23	6
4	12:25				UTAH	Interception returned 39 yards for touchdown by Julian Blackmon, Jason Redding kick good	30	6
4	9:19	9	75	3:06	BYU	Ty'Son Williams 10-yard touchdown run, 2-point run by Zach Wilson failed	30	12
"TOP" = time of possession. For other American football terms, see Glossary of American football.							30	12

=== At Tennessee ===
BYU at Tennessee

Team	1	2	3	4	OT	2OT	Total
• Cougars	3	0	7	6	7	6	29
Volunteers	7	6	0	3	7	3	26

- Date: September 7
- Location: Neyland Stadium
  Knoxville, Tennessee
- Game start: 7:05 EDT
- Elapsed time: 3:35
- Game attendance: 92,475
- Game weather: 84 °F (29 °C), Winds N 6 mph; Mostly sunny
- Referee: Brandon Cruse • Umpire: Tab Slaughter • Linesman: Mike Moeller • Line judge: Jay Bilbo • Back judge: Lyndon Nixon • Field judge: Gabriel DeLeon • Side judge: Corey Luxner • Center judge: Mike Contreraz
- TV announcers (ESPN): Dave Pasch, Greg McElroy, and Tom Luginbill

Uniform combination: white helmet, white jersey, navy pants w/ white accents.

Scoring summary

Quarter	Time	Drive			Team	Scoring information	Score	
Quarter	Time	Plays	Yards	TOP	Team	Scoring information	BYU	UT
1	0:50	15	80	7:15	UT	Jauan Jennings 5-yard touchdown reception from Jarrett Guarantano, Brent Cimaglia kick good	0	7
1	0:19	10	61	4:34	BYU	31-yard field goal by Jake Oldroyd	3	7
2	6:22	9	29	5:05	UT	51-yard field goal by Brent Cimaglia	3	10
2	0:21	6	64	1:27	UT	39-yard field goal by Brent Cimaglia	3	13
3	12:47	3	20	1:20	BYU	Ty'Son Williams 16-yard touchdown run, Jake Oldroyd kick good	10	13
4	11:41	14	77	6:46	UT	22-yard field goal by Brent Cimaglia	10	16
4	7:18	10	50	4:23	BYU	42-yard field goal by Jake Oldroyd	13	16
4	0:01	5	68	1:00	BYU	33-yard field goal by Jake Oldroyd	16	16
OT		3	25		BYU	Talon Shumway 14-yard touchdown reception from Zach Wilson, Jake Oldroyd kick good	23	16
OT		6	25		UT	Jauan Jennings 13-yard touchdown reception from Jarrett Guarantano, Brent Cimaglia kick good	23	23
2OT		4	2		UT	40-yard field goal by Brent Cimaglia	23	26
2OT		3	25		BYU	Ty'Son Williams 5-yard touchdown run, Jake Oldroyd kick Not Attempted	29	26
"TOP" = time of possession. For other American football terms, see Glossary of American football.							29	26

=== USC ===
USC at BYU

Team	1	2	3	4	OT	Total
No. 24/24 Trojans	7	10	0	10	0	27
• Cougars	10	7	0	10	3	30

- Date: September 14
- Location: LaVell Edwards Stadium
  Provo, Utah
- Game start: 1:36 p.m. MDT
- Elapsed time: 3:49
- Game attendance: 62,546
- Game weather: 80 °F (27 °C), Winds WSW 4 mph; Mostly sunny
- Referee: Scott Campbell • Umpire: Rick Podraza • Linesman: Doug Moore • Line judge: Keith Garmond • Back judge: Terry White • Field judge: Matt Mills • Side judge: Mario Seneca • Center judge: Tyree Walton
- TV announcers (ABC): Dave Pasch, Greg McElroy, and Tom Luginbill

Uniform combination: white helmet, navy jerseys, white pants w/ navy accents

Scoring summary

Quarter	Time	Drive			Team	Scoring information	Score	
Quarter	Time	Plays	Yards	TOP	Team	Scoring information	USC	BYU
1	10:39	10	74	4:21	USC	Michael Pittman Jr. 8-yard touchdown reception from Kedon Slovis, Chase McGrath kick good	7	0
1	6:10	4	28	1:10	BYU	Dayan Ghanwoloku 1-yard touchdown run, Jake Oldroyd kick good	7	7
1	3:01	5	21	1:52	BYU	23-yard field goal by Jake Oldroyd	7	10
2	14:50	9	78	3:06	USC	27-yard field goal by Chase McGrath	10	10
2	10:19	9	74	4:25	BYU	Dax Milne 30-yard touchdown reception from Zach Wilson, Jake Oldroyd kick good	10	17
2	5:03	11	76	5:08	USC	Vavae Malepeai 5-yard touchdown run, Chase McGrath kick good	17	17
4	10:45	13	92	5:27	USC	Michael Pittman Jr. 30-yard touchdown reception from Kedon Slovis, Chase McGrath kick good	24	17
4	8:13	7	61	2:32	BYU	32-yard field goal by Jake Oldroyd	24	20
4	5:41	3	52	0:57	BYU	Zach Wilson 16-yard touchdown run, Jake Oldroyd kick good	24	27
4	1:43	11	44	3:48	USC	52-yard field goal by Chase McGrath	27	27
OT		4	-1		BYU	43-yard field goal by Jake Oldroyd	27	30
"TOP" = time of possession. For other American football terms, see Glossary of American football.							27	30

=== Washington ===
Washington at BYU

Team	1	2	3	4	Total
• No. 22/21 Huskies	21	3	21	0	45
Cougars	3	9	7	0	19

- Date: September 21
- Location: LaVell Edwards Stadium
  Provo, Utah
- Game start: 1:36 p.m. MDT
- Elapsed time: 3:10
- Game attendance: 62,117
- Game weather: 62 °F (17 °C), Winds W 7 mph; Partly Cloudy
- Referee: Steve Strimling • Umpire: Francisco Villar • Linesman: Jon Stabile • Line judge: Michael Feldman • Back judge: John Morton • Field judge: Jeff Yock • Side judge: Clay Renard • Center judge: Jay Edwards
- TV announcers (ABC/ESPN2): Steve Levy, Brian Griese, Todd McShay, and Molly McGrath

Uniform combination: (Throwbacks) white helmet, white jerseys, royal blue pants w/ white accents

Scoring summary

Quarter	Time	Drive			Team	Scoring information	Score	
Quarter	Time	Plays	Yards	TOP	Team	Scoring information	WASH	BYU
1	12:10	8	75	2:50	WASH	Richard Newton 17-yard touchdown reception from Jacob Eason, Peyton Henry kick good	7	0
1	9:31	8	50	2:39	BYU	43-yard field goal by Jake Oldroyd	7	3
1	3:50	10	75	5:41	WASH	Aaron Fuller 17-yard touchdown reception from Jacob Eason, Peyton Henry kick good	14	3
1	2:17				WASH	Fumble recovery returned 69 yards for touchdown by Brandon Wellington, Peyton Henry kick good	21	3
2	11:00	8	61	3:15	WASH	30-yard field goal by Peyton Henry	24	3
2	8:22	5	75	2:38	BYU	Emmanuel Esukpa 1-yard touchdown run, Jake Oldroyd kick failed	24	9
2	0:26	13	59	3:47	BYU	54-yard field goal by Jake Oldroyd	24	12
3	12:28	3	52	1:11	WASH	Andre Baccellia 35-yard touchdown reception from Jacob Eason, Peyton Henry kick good	31	12
3	10:37				WASH	Punt returned 88 yards for touchdown by Aaron Fuller, Peyton Henry kick good	38	12
3	5:22	8	85	3:57	WASH	Richard Newton 3-yard touchdown run, Peyton Henry kick good	45	12
3	0:00	1	7	0:02	BYU	Matt Bushman 7-yard touchdown reception from Zach Wilson, Jake Oldroyd kick good	45	19
"TOP" = time of possession. For other American football terms, see Glossary of American football.							45	19

=== At Toledo ===
BYU at Toledo

Team	1	2	3	4	Total
Cougars	0	7	14	0	21
• Rockets	0	3	11	14	28

- Date: September 28
- Location: Glass Bowl
  Toledo, Ohio
- Game start: 12:05 p.m. EDT
- Elapsed time: 3:12
- Game attendance: 24,889
- Game weather: 72 °F (22 °C), Winds WSW 6 mph; Mostly Cloudy w/ thunderstorms possible
- Referee: Eddy Shelton • Umpire: Scott Teifer • Linesman: Bradford Edwards • Line judge: Quentin Givens • Back judge: Daniel Young • Field judge: Rich Almeroth • Side judge: Fulton Carson • Center judge: Stacy Hardin
- TV announcers (ESPN+): Michael Reghi and Dustin Fox

Uniform combination: white helmet, white jersey, navy pants w/ white accents.

Scoring summary

Quarter	Time	Drive			Team	Scoring information	Score	
Quarter	Time	Plays	Yards	TOP	Team	Scoring information	BYU	TOL
2	11:02	10	45	4:15	TOL	45-yard field goal by Evan Davis	0	3
2	4:09	3	35	1:32	BYU	Emmanuel Esukpa 32-yard touchdown run, Jake Oldroyd kick good	7	3
3	14:40	3	75	0:20	BYU	Aleva Hifo 75-yard touchdown reception from Zach Wilson, Skyler Southam kick good	14	3
3	9:44	14	66	4:56	TOL	26-yard field goal by Evan Davis	14	6
3	3:57	9	76	4:41	TOL	Shakif Seymour 18-yard touchdown reception from Mitchell Guadagni, 2-point pass good to Reggie Gilliam	14	14
3	2:40	3	23	0:27	BYU	Aleva Hifo 3-yard touchdown reception from Zach Wilson, Skyler Southam kick good	21	14
4	14:16	9	70	2:50	TOL	Bryant Koback 1-yard touchdown run, Evan Davis kick good	21	21
4	0:51	1	2	0:05	TOL	Shakif Seymour 2-yard touchdown run, Evan Davis kick good	21	28
"TOP" = time of possession. For other American football terms, see Glossary of American football.							21	28

=== At South Florida ===
BYU at USF

Team	1	2	3	4	Total
Cougars	3	13	7	0	23
• Bulls	0	7	7	13	27

- Date: October 12
- Location: Raymond James Stadium
  Tampa, Florida
- Game start: 3:30 p.m. EDT
- Elapsed time: 3:26
- Game attendance: 35,375
- Game weather: 87 °F (31 °C), Winds SW 3 mph; Mostly Sunny
- Referee: Mike Cuttone • Umpire: Mark Warner • Linesman: Greg Downum • Line judge: Carlos Owens • Back judge: Michael Aaronia • Field judge: Scott Melancon • Side judge: Richard Corona • Center judge: Ian Malepeai
- TV announcers (CBSSN): Dave Ryan, Corey Chavous, and Keenan Reynolds

Uniform combination: white helmet, white jerseys, white pants w/ navy accents

Scoring summary

Quarter	Time	Drive			Team	Scoring information	Score	
Quarter	Time	Plays	Yards	TOP	Team	Scoring information	BYU	USF
1	10:04	11	42	4:56	BYU	51-yard field goal by Jake Oldroyd	3	0
2	14:29	8	74	3:26	BYU	Dax Milne 35-yard touchdown reception from Jaren Hall, Jake Oldroyd kick good	10	0
2	9:07	12	63	3:58	BYU	22-yard field goal by Jake Oldroyd	13	0
2	6:01	8	86	3:06	USF	Mitchell Wilcox 36-yard touchdown reception from Jordan McCloud, Coby Weiss kick good	13	7
2	0:36	14	64	5:25	BYU	28-yard field goal by Jake Oldroyd	16	7
3	9:44	14	68	5:16	USF	Jordan Cronkite 1-yard touchdown run, Coby Weiss kick good	16	14
3	7:50	5	70	1:54	BYU	Jaren Hall 29-yard touchdown run, Jake Oldroyd kick good	23	14
4	14:57	4	23	0:57	USF	Jordan McCloud 2-yard touchdown run, Coby Weiss kick good	23	21
4	7:37	9	78	3:43	USF	Jordan Cronkite 3-yard touchdown run, Coby Weiss kick failed	23	27
"TOP" = time of possession. For other American football terms, see Glossary of American football.							23	27

=== Boise State ===
Boise State at BYU

Team	1	2	3	4	Total
No. 14/13 Broncos	7	3	0	15	25
• Cougars	7	0	21	0	28

- Date: October 19
- Location: LaVell Edwards Stadium
  Provo, Utah
- Game start: 8:25 p.m. MDT
- Elapsed time: 3:25
- Game attendance: 58,930
- Game weather: 41 °F (5 °C), Winds N 8 mph; Mostly Cloudy w/ Rain and Possible Snow Flurries
- Referee: Kevin Hassell • Umpire: Apollo Martin • Linesman: Jeff Hutcheon • Line judge: David Young • Back judge: Bobby Lynn • Field judge: Matt Bonford • Side judge: Mark Graves • Center judge: Abram Anaya
- TV announcers (ESPN2): Clay Matvick, Ryan Leaf, and Taylor McGregor

Uniform combination: white helmet, royal blue jerseys, white pants w/ royal blue accents

Scoring summary

Quarter	Time	Drive			Team	Scoring information	Score	
Quarter	Time	Plays	Yards	TOP	Team	Scoring information	BSU	BYU
1	10:28	9	70	4:32	BSU	CT Thomas 12-yard touchdown run, Eric Sachse kick good	7	0
1	3:34	16	78	6:49	BYU	Lopini Katoa 4-yard touchdown run, Jake Oldroyd kick good	7	7
2	0:28	11	42	3:41	BSU	38-yard field goal by Eric Sachse	10	7
3	13:03	4	75	1:57	BYU	Sione Finau 46-yard touchdown run, Jake Oldroyd kick good	10	14
3	4:49	5	80	2:57	BYU	Matt Bushman 27-yard touchdown reception from Baylor Romney, Jake Oldroyd kick good	10	21
3	3:10	2	41	0:42	BYU	Matt Bushman 39-yard touchdown reception from Baylor Romney, Jake Oldroyd kick good	10	28
4	12:42	14	81	5:22	BSU	Octavis Evans 13-yard touchdown reception from Chase Cord, 2-point Chase Cord pass to Garrett Collingham good	18	28
4	3:17	9	79	3:24	BSU	Akilian Butler 5-yard touchdown reception from Chase Cord, Eric Sachse kick good	25	28
"TOP" = time of possession. For other American football terms, see Glossary of American football.							25	28

=== At Utah State ===
BYU at Utah State

Team	1	2	3	4	Total
• Cougars	7	14	14	7	42
Aggies	7	7	0	0	14

- Date: November 2
- Location: Maverik Stadium
  Logan, Utah
- Game start: 8:05 p.m. MDT
- Elapsed time: 3:36
- Game attendance: 25,472
- Game weather: 34 °F (1 °C), Winds N 2 mph; Mostly Clear
- Referee: Michael VanderVelde • Umpire: Rico Orsot • Linesman: Eric Carmouche • Line judge: Mark Estermyer • Back judge: Robert Lewis • Field judge: Eric McNally • Side judge: Steve Heiman • Center judge: Greg Reid
- TV announcers (ESPN2): Jason Benetti, Rod Gilmore, and Quint Kessenich

Uniform combination: white helmet, white jerseys, white pants w/ royal blue accents

Scoring summary

Quarter	Time	Drive			Team	Scoring information	Score	
Quarter	Time	Plays	Yards	TOP	Team	Scoring information	BYU	USU
1	9:22	11	93	4:36	BYU	Aleva Hifo 6-yard touchdown run, Jake Oldroyd kick good	7	0
1	0:18	7	86	2:17	USU	Siaosi Mariner 26-yard touchdown reception from Jordan Love, Dominik Eberle kick good	7	7
2	11:53	1	16	0:06	BYU	Jaren Hall 16-yard touchdown run, Jake Oldroyd kick good	14	7
2	2:33	7	71	3:30	BYU	Jaren Hall 7-yard touchdown run, Jake Oldroyd kick good	21	7
2	0:34	11	86	1:52	USU	Gerold Bright 1-yard touchdown run, Dominik Eberle kick good	21	14
3	11:47	7	75	3:13	BYU	Micah Simon 11-yard touchdown reception from Baylor Romney, Jake Oldroyd kick good	28	14
3	7:12	7	68	2:53	BYU	Gunner Romney 1-yard touchdown reception from Baylor Romney, Jake Oldroyd kick good	35	14
4	9:31	10	99	5:00	BYU	Lopini Katoa 6-yard touchdown run, Jake Oldroyd kick good	42	14
"TOP" = time of possession. For other American football terms, see Glossary of American football.							42	14

=== Liberty ===
Liberty at BYU

Team	1	2	3	4	Total
Flames	7	0	10	7	24
• Cougars	7	10	7	7	31

- Date: November 9
- Location: LaVell Edwards Stadium
  Provo, Utah
- Game start: 5:32 p.m. MST
- Elapsed time: 3:15
- Game attendance: 54,683
- Game weather: 46 °F (8 °C), Winds NNE 3 mph; Mostly Clear
- Referee: Char Lamertina • Umpire: Mike Wooten • Linesman: Mat Fitzgerald • Line judge: Hugh Campbell • Back judge: Peter Buchanan • Field judge: Mike Cullin • Side judge: Rick Santilli • Center judge: Jeff Tomlin
- TV announcers (ESPNU): Mike Corey and Rene Ingoglia

Uniform combination: white helmet, navy jerseys, white pants w/ navy accents

Scoring summary

Quarter	Time	Drive			Team	Scoring information	Score	
Quarter	Time	Plays	Yards	TOP	Team	Scoring information	LIB	BYU
1	11:04	10	75	3:56	LIB	Zac Foutz 19-yard touchdown reception from Stephen Calvert, Alex Probert kick good	7	0
1	7:56	8	75	3:08	BYU	Micah Simon 2-yard touchdown reception from Baylor Romney, Jake Oldroyd kick good	7	7
2	10:54	14	69	5:23	BYU	24-yard field goal by Jake Oldroyd	7	10
2	8:36	2	60	0:47	BYU	Matt Bushman 44-yard touchdown reception from Baylor Romney, Jake Oldroyd kick good	7	17
3	7:58	12	72	4:04	LIB	24-yard field goal by Alex Probert	10	17
3	4:11	8	75	3:47	BYU	Aleva Hifo 41-yard touchdown reception from Baylor Romney, Jake Oldroyd kick good	10	24
3	2:11	6	77	1:54	LIB	Antonio Gandy-Golden 41-yard touchdown reception from Stephen Calvert, Alex Probert kick good	17	24
4	12:01	9	68	3:46	BYU	Moroni Laulu-Pututau 17-yard touchdown reception from Baylor Romney, Jake Oldroyd kick good	17	31
4	6:35	4	46	1:13	LIB	Zac Foutz 13-yard touchdown reception from Stephen Calvert, Alex Probert kick good	24	31
"TOP" = time of possession. For other American football terms, see Glossary of American football.							24	31

=== Idaho State ===
Idaho State at BYU

Team	1	2	3	4	Total
Bengals	0	3	7	0	10
• Cougars	7	21	14	0	42

- Date: November 16
- Location: LaVell Edwards Stadium
  Provo, Utah
- Game start: 1:05 p.m. MST
- Elapsed time: 2:59
- Game attendance: 57,379
- Game weather: 58 °F (14 °C), Winds N 8 mph; Sunny with a few clouds
- Referee: Char Lamertina • Umpire: Mike Wooten • Linesman: Mat Fitzgerald • Line judge: Hugh Campbell • Back judge: Rick Santilli • Field judge: Mike Cullin • Side judge: Peter Buchanan • Center judge: Jeff Tomlin
- TV announcers (BYUtv): Dave McCann, Blaine Fowler, and Carla Haslam

Uniform combination: white helmet, royal blue jerseys, white pants w/ royal blue accents

Scoring summary

Quarter	Time	Drive			Team	Scoring information	Score	
Quarter	Time	Plays	Yards	TOP	Team	Scoring information	ISU	BYU
1	9:12				BYU	Interception returned 26 yards for touchdown by Austin Lee, Jake Oldroyd kick good	0	7
2	12:59	11	77	4:12	BYU	Micah Simon 12-yard touchdown run, Jake Oldroyd kick good	0	14
2	9:46	9	66	3:13	ISU	27-yard field goal by Kevin Ryan	3	14
2	6:45	8	75	3:01	BYU	Sione Finau 16-yard touchdown run, Jake Oldroyd kick good	3	21
2	5:00	2	27	0:54	BYU	Talon Shumway 26-yard touchdown reception from Zach Wilson, Jake Oldroyd kick good	3	28
3	9:18	6	60	2:23	BYU	Talon Shumway 3-yard touchdown reception from Zach Wilson, Jake Oldroyd kick good	3	35
3	8:14	2	26	0:53	BYU	Khyiris Tonga 3-yard touchdown run, Jake Oldroyd kick good	3	42
3	7:37	2	65	0:30	ISU	Malakai Rango 54-yard touchdown run, Kevin Ryan kick good	10	42
"TOP" = time of possession. For other American football terms, see Glossary of American football.							10	42

=== At UMass ===
BYU at UMass

Team	1	2	3	4	Total
• Cougars	7	42	7	0	56
Minutemen	0	0	10	14	24

- Date: November 23
- Location: Warren McGuirk Alumni Stadium
  Amherst, Massachusetts
- Game start: 12:04 p.m. EST
- Elapsed time: 3:07
- Game attendance: 8,204
- Game weather: 44 °F (7 °C), Winds NW 11 mph; Sunny with a few clouds
- Referee: Michael VanderVelde • Umpire: Rico Orsot • Linesman: Eric Carmouche • Line judge: Mark Estermyer • Back judge: Robert Lewis • Field judge: Eric McNally • Side judge: Steve Heiman • Center judge: Greg Reid
- TV announcers (FloSports): Josh Maurer, Andy Gresh, and Matt Goldstein

Uniform combination: white helmet, white jerseys, navy pants w/ white accents

Scoring summary

Quarter	Time	Drive			Team	Scoring information	Score	
Quarter	Time	Plays	Yards	TOP	Team	Scoring information	BYU	UMASS
1	9:01	6	87	2:50	BYU	Tyler Allgeier 57-yard touchdown reception from Zach Wilson, Jake Oldroyd kick good	7	0
2	14:15	13	88	6:14	BYU	Lopini Katoa 3-yard touchdown run, Jake Oldroyd kick good	14	0
2	12:27	1	48	0:09	BYU	Talon Shumway 48-yard touchdown reception from Zach Wilson, Jake Oldroyd kick good	21	0
2	9:08	6	58	2:30	BYU	Lopini Katoa 14-yard touchdown reception from Zach Wilson, Jake Oldroyd kick good	28	0
2	7:10	2	59	0:43	BYU	Jackson McChesney 44-yard touchdown run, Jake Oldroyd kick good	35	0
2	5:43	2	22	0:43	BYU	Gunner Romney 18-yard touchdown reception from Zach Wilson, Jake Oldroyd kick good	42	0
2	0:47	7	59	2:58	BYU	Aleva Hifo 5-yard touchdown run, Jake Oldroyd kick good	49	0
3	13:16	1	12	0:06	UMASS	Zak Simon 12-yard touchdown reception from Randall West, Jake Oldroyd kick good	49	7
3	7:13	11	41	4:32	UMASS	29-yard field goal by Cooper Garcia	49	10
3	7:10	2	74	0:44	BYU	Jackson McChesney 12-yard touchdown run, Jake Oldroyd kick good	56	10
4	8:27	5	50	1:52	UMASS	Josiah Johnson 3-yard touchdown reception from Randall West, Cooper Garcia kick good	56	17
4	4:56	5	58	1:27	UMASS	Bilal Ally 46-yard touchdown run, Cooper Garcia kick good	56	24
"TOP" = time of possession. For other American football terms, see Glossary of American football.							56	24

=== At San Diego State ===
BYU at San Diego State

Team	1	2	3	4	Total
Cougars	3	0	0	0	3
• Aztecs	0	7	3	3	13

- Date: November 30
- Location: SDCCU Stadium
  San Diego, CA
- Game start: 6:07 p.m. PST
- Elapsed time: 3:08
- Game attendance: 28,180
- Game weather: 58 °F (14 °C), Winds SW 2 mph; Mostly cloudy
- Referee: Stephen Baron • Umpire: Bill Bishop • Linesman: George Shoup • Line judge: John Kilmer • Back judge: David Baldwin • Field judge: John Wisnewski • Side judge: Richard Ockey • Center judge: Timothy Davis
- TV announcers (CBSSN): Dave Ryan, Corey Chavous & Amanda Guerra

Uniform combination: white helmet, white jerseys, royal blue pants w/ white accents

Scoring summary

Quarter	Time	Drive			Team	Scoring information	Score	
Quarter	Time	Plays	Yards	TOP	Team	Scoring information	BYU	SDSU
1	3:39	7	39	2:36	BYU	23-yard field goal by Skyler Southam	3	0
2	0:13	10	61	2:10	SDSU	Daniel Bellinger 25-yard touchdown reception from Carson Baker, Matt Araiza kick good	3	7
3	5:23	11	52	6:19	SDSU	44-yard field goal by Matt Araiza	3	10
4	5:40	8	70	4:29	SDSU	27-yard field goal by Matt Araiza	3	13
"TOP" = time of possession. For other American football terms, see Glossary of American football.							3	13

=== Hawai'i ===
Hawai'i vs. BYU

Team	1	2	3	4	Total
• Rainbow Warriors	14	17	0	7	38
Cougars	7	17	7	3	34

- Date: December 24
- Location: Aloha Stadium
  Honolulu, HI
- Game start: 3:06 p.m.
- Elapsed time: 3:58
- Game attendance: 21,582
- Game weather: 86 °F (30 °C), Winds N 11 mph; Partly Cloudy
- Referee: Tim O'Dey • Umpire: Tony Smith • Linesman: Nick Brigati • Line judge: John Swartz • Back judge: Paul Stout • Field judge: John Masterson • Side judge: Steve Verbridge • Center judge: Ron Kay
- TV announcers (ESPN/ESPN Radio): Jason Benetti, Rod Gilmore, and Quint Kessenich (ESPN)
  Kevin Winter, Brad Edwards, and Trevor Matich (ESPN Radio)

Uniform combination: white helmet, royal blue jerseys, white pants w/ royal blue accents

Scoring summary

Quarter	Time	Drive			Team	Scoring information	Score	
Quarter	Time	Plays	Yards	TOP	Team	Scoring information	UH	BYU
1	7:32	10	82	5:09	UH	Jared Smart 7-yard touchdown reception from Cole McDonald, Ryan Meskell kick good	7	0
1	4:55	2	40	0:51	UH	Jared Smart 40-yard touchdown reception from Cole McDonald, Ryan Meskell kick good	14	0
1	0:54	10	73	3:57	BYU	Lopini Katoa 1-yard touchdown run, Jake Oldroyd kick good	14	7
2	13:33	6	78	2:17	UH	Cole McDonald 1-yard touchdown run, Ryan Meskell kick good	21	7
2	9:42	8	75	3:51	BYU	Zach Wilson 1-yard touchdown run, Jake Oldroyd kick good	21	14
2	5:50	9	49	3:46	UH	46-yard field goal by Ryan Meskell	24	14
2	3:16	7	75	2:34	BYU	Micah Simon 11-yard touchdown run, Jake Oldroyd kick good	24	21
2	1:16	9	71	1:55	UH	Jason-Matthew Sharsh 18-yard touchdown reception from Cole McDonald, Ryan Meskell kick good	31	21
2	0:18	8	50	0:58	BYU	37-yard field goal by Jake Oldroyd	31	24
3	11:58	2	6	0:39	BYU	Zach Wilson 2-yard touchdown run, Jake Oldroyd kick good	31	31
4	14:37	8	54	3:09	BYU	20-yard field goal by Jake Oldroyd	31	34
4	1:17	4	71	0:44	UH	Nick Mardner 24-yard touchdown reception from Cole McDonald, Ryan Meskell kick good	38	34
"TOP" = time of possession. For other American football terms, see Glossary of American football.							38	34

== Media ==
=== Football Media Day ===
Affiliates

- BYU Radio – Flagship Station Nationwide (Dish Network 980, Sirius XM 143, KBYU 89.1 FM HD 2, TuneIn radio, and byuradio.org)
- KSL 102.7 FM and 1160 AM – (Salt Lake City / Provo, Utah and ksl.com)
- KSNA – Blackfoot / Idaho Falls / Pocatello / Rexburg, Idaho (games)
- KSPZ – Blackfoot / Idaho Falls / Pocatello / Rexburg, Idaho (coaches' shows)
- KMXD – Monroe / Manti, Utah
- KSVC – Richfield / Manti, Utah
- KDXU – St. George, Utah

== Personnel ==
=== Coaching staff ===
Name	Position
Kalani Sitake	Head coach
Ed Lamb	Assistant head coach/special teams/linebackers coach
Jeff Grimes	Offensive coordinator
Eric Mateos	Offensive line coach
Fesi Sitake	Wide receivers coach
Steve Clark	Tight end coach
Aaron Roderick	Passing game coordinator/quarterbacks coach
Ilaisa Tuiaki	Defensive coordinator/defensive line coach
Preston Hadley	Safeties coach
Jernaro Gilford	Cornerbacks coach
A.J. Seward	Running backs coach

=== Roster ===
2019 BYU Cougars football team roster
Players
Coaches
Offense

Pos.	#	Name	Class
QB	10	Joe Critchlow	So
QB	3	Jaren Hall	Fr
QB	19	Rhett Reilly	Fr
QB	16	Baylor Romney	Fr
QB	1	Zach Wilson	So
OL	65	Ethan Atagi	Fr
OL	56	Clark Barrington	Fr
OL	67	Brady Christensen	So
OL	66	James Empey	So
OL	71	Blake Freeland	Fr
OL	68	JT Gentry	Fr
OL	73	Caden Haws	Fr
OL	77	Chandon Herring	Jr
OL	69	Tristen Hoge (injured)	Jr
OL	64	Brayden Keim	Fr
OL	76	Harris LaChance	Fr
OL	74	Kieffer Longson (injured)	Jr
OL	72	Addison Pulsipher	Sr
OL	61	Keanu Saleapaga	So
OL	59	Thomas Shoaf (injured)	Sr
OL	79	Jacob Smith	Fr
OL	63	Joe Tukuafu	Fr
OL	68	Mo Unutoa	So
OL	70	Brevan Ward	So
RB	25	Tyler Allgeier	Fr
RB	33	Emmanuel Esukpa	Sr
RB	35	Sione Finau (injured)	Fr
RB	4	Lopini Katoa	So
RB	27	Jackson McChesney	Fr
RB	28	Masen Wake	Fr
RB	29	Chase Wester	So
RB	5	Ty'Son Williams (injured)	Sr
RB	30	Alec Wyble-Meza	So
TE	89	Matt Bushman	Jr
TE	42	Kyle Griffitts	Jr
TE	80	Nate Heaps	So
TE	17	Moroni Laulu-Pututau	Sr
TE	88	Alema Pilimai	Fr
TE	83	Isaac Rex	Fr
TE	32	Hank Tuipulotu (injured)	Fr
TE	99	Carter Wheat	Fr
WR	24	Luc Andrada	Fr
WR	31	Jacob Boren	Fr
WR	85	Brayden Cosper	Fr
WR	82	Talmage Gunther	Fr
WR	80	Koy Harris	Fr
WR	15	Aleva Hifo	Sr
WR	12	Keanu Hill	Fr
WR	84	Tevita Ika	Fr
WR	23	Batchlor Johnson IV	Jr
WR	82	Dax Milne	So
WR	2	Neil Pau'u	Jr
WR	18	Gunner Romney	So
WR	26	Spencer Romney	So
WR	21	Talon Shumway	Sr
WR	13	Micah Simon	Sr
WR	22	Nephi Stevens	Sr
WR	86	Jacob Talbot	So
WR	83	Austin Whetzel	Jr

Defense

Pos.	#	Name	Class
DB	23	Zayne Anderson (injured)	Sr
DB	43	Chapman Beaird	Fr
DB	10	Javelle Brown	Fr
DB	30	Keenan Ellis	So
DB	34	Tavita Gagnier	Fr
DB	15	Dimitri Gallow (injured)	Jr
DB	5	Dayan Ghanwoloku	Sr
DB	35	Ammon Hannemann	Fr
DB	37	Kimball Henstrom	Fr
DB	11	Isaiah Herron	Fr
DB	43	Jared Kapisi	Jr
DB	2	Austin Lee	Sr
DB	2	Dallin Lee	Fr
DB	22	Hayden Livingston	Fr
DB	16	D'Angelo Mandell	So
DB	12	Malik Moore	So
DB	28	Sawyer Powell	Sr
DB	26	Mitchell Price	So
DB	36	Morgan Pyper	Fr
DB	27	Beau Tanner	Sr
DB	7	George Udo	Fr
DB	1	Troy Warner	Sr
DB	25	Will Watanabe	Fr
DB	32	Chris Wilcox (injured)	Sr
DB	29	Shamon Willis	Fr
DL	97	Austin Chambers	Jr
DL	99	Zac Dawe	Jr
DL	93	Bracken El-Bakri	Jr
DL	55	Lorenzo Fauatea	So
DL	44	Seleti Fevaleaki	Fr
DL	90	Devin Kaufusi	So
DL	58	Uriah Leiataua	Jr
DL	94	Freddy Livai	Fr
DL	45	Darius McFarland	Fr
DL	62	Atunaisa Mahe	Fr
DL	88	JJ Nwigwe	Sr
DL	52	Trajan Pili	Sr
DL	94	Gabe Summers	So
DL	59	Alden Tofa	So
DL	95	Khyiris Tonga	Jr
DL	51	Jeddy Tuiloma	So
DL	91	Earl Tuioti-Mariner (injured)	So
LB	3	Chaz Ah You	So
LB	50	Sam Baldwin	Sr
LB	35	Ben Bywater	Fr
LB	17	Matthew Criddle	So
LB	34	Kavika Fonua	Jr
LB	48	Solofa Funa	Fr
LB	46	Drew Jensen	Fr
LB	24	Austin Kafentzis	Sr
LB	53	Isaiah Kaufusi	Jr
LB	38	Jackson Kaufusi	Fr
LB	21	Sam Lee	Jr
LB	48	Alex Miskela	Fr
LB	41	Keenan Pili	Fr
LB	46	Pepe Tanuvasa	So
LB	36	Kade Pupunu	Fr
LB	31	Max Tooley	Fr
LB	49	Payton Wilgar	Fr

Special teams

Pos.	#	Name	Class
DS	98	Mitch Harris	Sr
DS	54	Britton Hogan	Fr
P	19	Danny Jones	Jr
K	39	Jake Oldroyd	So
K	20	Skyler Southam	So

Head coach

- Kalani Sitake (BYU)

Coordinators/assistant coaches

- Ed Lamb (BYU)
  Assistant head coach, Special Teams, Linebackers
- Jeff Grimes (UTEP)
  Offensive coordinator
- Aaron Roderick (BYU)
  Passing Game Coordintor/quarterbacks
- Eric Mateos (Southwest Baptist)
  Offensive line
- Fesi Sitake (Southern Utah)
  Wide receivers
- Steve Clark (BYU)
  Tight ends
- AJ Seward (Kansas)
  Running backs
- Ilaisa Tuiaki (Southern Utah)
  Defensive coordinator, Defensive line
- Jernaro Gilford (BYU)
  Cornerbacks
- Preston Hadley (BYU)
  Safeties
- Nu'u Tafisi (California)
  Strength and Conditioning
- Justin McClure (Northern Colorado)
  Asst. Strength and Conditioning
- AJ Middleton (Redlands)
  Asst. Strength and Conditioning
- Jon Swift (BYU)
  Director of football operations
- Alema Fitisemanu (BYU)
  Player Personnel coordinator
- Jack Damuni (BYU)
  Community Relations coordinator
- Jasen Ah You (BYU)
  Support Services coordinator
- Tasha Bell (Utah Valley)
  Player Development/On Campus Recruiting
- Harvey Unga (BYU)
  Offensive Graduate Assistant
- Spencer Patterson (Utah Tech)
  Offensive Graduate Assistant
- Manase Tonga (BYU)
  Defensive Graduate Assistant
- Gavin Fowler (BYU)
  Defensive Graduate Assistant

Legend

- (C) Team captain
- (S) Suspended
- (I) Ineligible
- Injured
- Redshirt

Roster

=== Depth chart ===
Defense

FS
Austin Lee
Malik Moore
Will Watanabe

WLB	MLB	SLB
Isaiah Kaufusi	Kavika Fonua	Chaz Ah You
Payton Wilgar	Keenan Pili	Austin Kafentzis
Max Tooley	Jackson Kaufusi	Matthew Criddle

SS
Beau Tanner
Troy Warner
Sawyer Powell

CB
Dayan Ghanwoloku
Shamon Willis
George Udo

DE	DT	DT	DE
Devin Kaufusi	Khyiris Tonga	Lorenzo Fauatea	Bracken El-bakri
Uriah Leiataua	Atunaisa Mahe	JJ Nwigwe	Zac Dawe
Trajan Pili	Austin Chambers	Gabe Summers	Alden Tofa

CB
D'Angelo Mandell
Isaiah Herron
Tavita Gagnier

Offense

X-Receiver
Micah Simon
Gunner Romney
Dax Milne

LT	LG	C	RG	RT
Brady Christensen	Chandon Herring	James Empey	Keanu Saleapaga	Blake Freeland
Joe Tukuafu	J.T. Gentry	Caden Haws	Clark Barrington	Harris LaChance
Brayden Keim	Brevan Ward	Ethan Atagi	Addison Pulsipher	Jacob Smith

TE
Matt Bushman
Moroni Laulu-Pututau
Carter Wheat

Z-Receiver
Aleva Hifo
Talon Shumway
Keanu Hill

QB
Zach Wilson
Baylor Romney
Jaren Hall

Key reserves
LB Drew Jensen
RB/LB Tyler Allgeier
WR Koy Harris
WR Batchlor Johnson IV
WR Tevita Ika
DB Hayden Livingston
DB Mitchell Price
DB Jared Kapisi

RB
Lopini Katoa
Emmanual Esukpa
Jackson McChesney

FB
Masen Wake
Kyle Griffitts
⋅

Special teams
PK Skyler Southam
PK Jake Oldroyd
P Jake Oldroyd
P Danny Jones
KR Dax Milne
KR Lopini Katoa
PR Aleva Hifo
PR Dayan Ghanwoloku
LS Mitch Harris
LS Britton Hogan
H Hayden Livingston
H Will Watanabe

== Rankings ==
Ranking movements Legend: ██ Increase in ranking ██ Decrease in ranking — = Not ranked RV = Received votes
	Week																
Poll	Pre	1	2	3	4	5	6	7	8	9	10	11	12	13	14	15	Final
AP	—	—	—	RV	—	—	—	—	—	—	—	—	—	—			
Coaches	—	—	—	RV	—	—	—	—	—	—	—	—	—	—			
CFP	Not released									—	—	—	—				Not released
