= 2020 BYU Cougars football team =

American college football season

2020 BYU Cougars football

Boca Raton Bowl champion

Boca Raton Bowl, W 49–23 vs. UCF
- Conference: Independent

Ranking
- Coaches: No. 11
- AP: No. 11
- Record: 11–1
- Head coach: Kalani Sitake (5th season)
- Offensive coordinator: Jeff Grimes (3rd season)
- Offensive scheme: Power spread
- Defensive coordinator: Ilaisa Tuiaki (5th season)
- Base defense: 4–3
- Captains: Matt Bushman; Lopini Katoa; Brady Christensen; James Empey; Troy Warner; Isaiah Kaufusi; Khyiris Tonga; Zayne Anderson
- Home stadium: LaVell Edwards Stadium

2020 NCAA Division I FBS independents football records
| | Conf. | | | Overall |
| Team | W | | L | W | | L |
|---|---|---|---|---|---|---|
| No. 11 BYU | | – | | 11 | – | 1 |
| No. 17 Liberty | | – | | 10 | – | 1 |
| Army | | – | | 9 | – | 3 |
| New Mexico State | | – | | 1 | – | 1 |
| UMass | | – | | 0 | – | 4 |
Note: Due to COVID-19, UConn canceled the 2020 football season; New Mexico State was the only FBS school to play a spring schedule.; Rankings from AP Poll.

The 2020 BYU Cougars football team represented Brigham Young University in the 2020 NCAA Division I FBS football season. The Cougars were led by fifth-year head coach Kalani Sitake and played their home games at LaVell Edwards Stadium. This was the 10th year that BYU competed as an NCAA Division I FBS independent.

== Before the season ==
=== Coaching changes ===
Running back coach A.J. Steward took a position on the University of Arizona coaching staff and was replaced by former BYU fullback Harvey Unga.

=== 2020 recruits ===
| Name | Pos. | Height | Weight | Hometown | Notes |
|---|---|---|---|---|---|
| Sol-Jay Maiava-Peters | QB | 6'0" | 190 | Laie, Hawaii | |
| Kody Epps | WR | 5'10" | 170 | Los Angeles, California | |
| Isaiah Tupuo | OL | 6'3" | 316 | Sacramento, California | Mission prior to enrolling |
| Josh Larsen | DL | 6'4" | 230 | Woods Cross, Utah | Absent from fall roster |
| Micah Harper | DB | 5'11" | 170 | Chandler, Arizona | |
| Josh Wilson | LB | 6'0" | 210 | Draper, Utah | |
| Terence Fall | WR | 6'2" | 185 | San Bernardino, California | |
| Alex Muti | DL | 6'3" | 200 | Kealakekua, Hawaii | |
| Nukuluve Helu | RB | 6'1" | 195 | Tooele, Utah | Mission prior to enrolling |
| Petey Tuipulotu | DB | 6'3" | 190 | Fort Mill, South Carolina | |
| Ty Burke | DB | 6'1" | 175 | Syracuse, Utah | Mission prior to enrolling |
| Dean Jones | DB | 6'2" | 190 | Phoenix, Arizona | Mission prior to enrolling |
| Bodie Schoonover | LB | 6'4" | 215 | American Fork, Utah | Mission prior to enrolling |
| Logan Pili | LB | 6'1" | 205 | Provo, Utah | Mission prior to enrolling |
| John Nelson | DL | 6'4" | 260 | Salem, Utah | Mission prior to enrolling |
| Jake Griffin | OL | 6'6" | 265 | Mesa, Arizona | Mission prior to enrolling |
| Chandler Bird | OL | 6'1" | 285 | Ocean City, New Jersey | |
| Devin Downing | WR | 6'2" | 175 | American Fork, Utah | Mission prior to enrolling |
| Tate Romney | LB | 6'3" | 220 | Chandler, Arizona | Mission prior to enrolling |
| Miles Davis | RB | 6'1" | 193 | Las Vegas, Nevada | |
| Ace Kaufusi | DB | 6'3" | 200 | Kahuku, Hawaii | Mission prior to enrolling |
| Koa Eldredge | WR | 6'0" | 190 | Honolulu, Hawaii | Mission prior to enrolling |
| Burke Parker | OL | 6'4" | 275 | Honolulu, Hawaii | |

=== 2019 returned missionaries ===
| Name | Pos. | Height | Weight | Year | Notes |
|---|---|---|---|---|---|
| Tyler Batty | DL | 6'5" | 261 | Freshman | |
| Jacob Conover | QB | 6'1" | 205 | Freshman | |
| Mason Fakahua | QB | 6'2" | 217 | Freshman | |
| Bentley Hanshaw | TE | 6'6" | 225 | Freshman | |
| Preston Lewis | LB | 6'2" | 225 | Freshman | |
| Ryan Rehkow | P | 6'5" | 205 | Freshman | |
| Andrew Slack | DL | 6'5" | 290 | Freshman | |
| Seth Willis | OL | 6'6" | 325 | Freshman | |
| Ben Tuipulotu | TE | 6'4" | 200 | Freshman | |
| Connor Pay | OL | 6'6" | 295 | Freshman | |
| Truman Andrus | LB | 6'2" | 215 | Freshman | |
| Joe Nelson | WR | 6'3" | 190 | Freshman | |
| Austin Riggs | LS | 6'5" | 215 | Freshman | |
| Kade Moore | WR | 5'11" | 170 | Freshman | |
| Justen Smith | K | 6'2" | 190 | Freshman | |
| Chayce Bolli | WR | 6'0" | 190 | Freshman | |
| Jacob Palu | DL | 6'2" | 295 | Freshman | |
| Ethan Slade | DB | 6'0" | 175 | Freshman | |

=== 2020 other additions ===
| Name | Pos. | Height | Weight | Year | Notes |
|---|---|---|---|---|---|
| Caleb Christensen | DB | 5'9" | 193 | Freshman | Originally Signed in 2019 |
| Fisher Jackson | DL | 6'5" | 252 | Freshman | Originally Signed in 2019 |
| Hobbs Nyberg | WR | 5'11" | 195 | Freshman | Originally Signed in 2019 Baseball |
| Jaques Wilson | DB | 5'11" | 185 | Junior | Transfer from West Los Angeles College |
| Chris Jackson | WR | 5'10" | 180 | Junior | Transfer from Mt. San Antonio College |
| Lane Lunt | TE | 6'4" | 230 | Junior | Transfer from Eastern Arizona College |
| Hinckley Ropati | RB | 5'11" | 210 | Sophomore | Transfer from Cerritos College |
| Theo Dawson | RB | 6'0" | 225 | Sophomore | Transfer from University of Wyoming |
| Chase Hughes | LB | 6'1" | 214 | Sophomore | Transfer from University of Wyoming |
| Wes Wright | DB | 6'1" | 175 | Sophomore | Transfer from Snow College |
| Jason Money | DB | 6'1" | 203 | Junior | Transfer from Snow College |
| Hirkley Latu | DL | 6'3" | 240 | Sophomore | Return after sitting out 2019 |
| Samuel Allred | DB | 6'0" | 205 | Senior | |

=== 2020 departures ===
| Name | Pos. | Height | Weight | Year | Notes |
|---|---|---|---|---|---|
| Sam Baldwin | LB | 6'3" | 205 | Senior | Graduation |
| Emmanuel Esukpa | RB | 5'11" | 225 | Senior | Graduation |
| Dayan Ghanwoloku | DB | 5'11" | 200 | Senior | Graduation |
| Mitch Harris | LS | 6'4" | 219 | Senior | Graduation |
| Aleva Hifo | WR | 5'10" | 187 | Senior | Graduation |
| Austin Kafentzis | LB | 6'1" | 200 | Senior | Graduation |
| Moroni Laulu-Pututau | TE | 6'5" | 240 | Senior | Graduation |
| Austin Lee | DB | 6'0" | 200 | Senior | Graduation |
| JJ Nwigwe | DL | 6'5" | 260 | Senior | Graduation |
| Trajan Pili | DL | 6'2" | 255 | Senior | Graduation |
| Sawyer Powell | DB | 6'1" | 195 | Senior | Graduation |
| Addison Pulsipher | OL | 6'5" | 293 | Senior | Graduation |
| Thomas Shoaf | OL | 6'5" | 300 | Senior | Graduation |
| Talon Shumway | WR | 6'3" | 210 | Senior | Graduation |
| Micah Simon | WR | 6'1" | 195 | Senior | Graduation |
| Beau Tanner | DB | 6'0" | 189 | Senior | Graduation |
| Ty'Son Williams | RB | 6'0" | 220 | Senior | Graduation |
| Batchlor Johnson IV | WR | 5'9" | 160 | Senior | Graduation |
| Skyler Southam | K | 6'0" | 195 | Sophomore | Transfer |
| Devin Kaufusi | DL | 6'7" | 257 | Junior | Transfer |
| Austin Chambers | DL | 6'5" | 305 | Junior | Transfer |
| Alex Wyble-Meza | RB | 5'10" | 200 | Sophomore | Transfer |
| Ethan Atagi | OL | 6'5" | 323 | Sophomore | Transfer |
| Darius McFarland | DL | 6'2" | 254 | Freshman | Transfer |
| Joe Critchlow | QB | 6'4" | 220 | Sophomore | |
| Alex Miskela | LB | 6'1" | 235 | Freshman | |
| Danny Jones | P | 6'4" | 240 | Junior | |
| Dallin Lee | DB | 6'2" | 200 | Freshman | |
| Jacob Smith | OL | 6'5" | 306 | Freshman | |
| Austin Whetzel | WR | 5'11" | 175 | Junior | |
| Nate Heaps | TE | 6'4" | 260 | Sophomore | |
| Brevan Ward | OL | 6'5" | 298 | Sophomore | |
| Spencer Romney | WR | 5'10" | 171 | Sophomore | |
| Jacob Talbot | WR | 6'3" | 200 | Sophomore | |
| Will Watanabe | DB | 5'10" | 202 | Freshman | |
| Kimball Henstrom | DB | 6'0" | 191 | Freshman | |
| Dimitri Gallow | DB | 6'0" | 190 | Junior | |
| Chapman Beaird | DB | 6'3" | 196 | Freshman | |
| Koy Harris | WR | 6'1" | 175 | Sophomore | |
| Tevita Ika | WR | 5'8" | 186 | Freshman | |
| Solofa Funa | DL | 6'2" | 245 | Freshman | |

== Schedule ==
BYU's games against Michigan State, Minnesota, Utah, Arizona State, Stanford and Missouri were all canceled before the season started. These were moves by the Pac-12, Big Ten and SEC related to COVID-19 in order to reduce the spread of the virus through travel restrictions. Any other changes to the schedule will be made in accordance with these restrictions. On August 8, 2020, the Mid-American Conference suspended their season taking Northern Illinois off of BYU's schedule. On August 10, 2020, Mountain West Conference suspended their 2020 season removing Utah State, Boise State and San Diego State from the Cougars’ 2020 schedule. The game at Army, scheduled for September 19 as part of the replacement slate of games, was postponed indefinitely on September 12 with both the academy and BYU pledging to attempt to reschedule the game for a later date. Subsequently, the Mountain West Conference announced that both Boise State and San Diego State would be permitted to play BYU late in the season.

| Date | Time | Opponent | Rank | Site | TV | Result | Attendance |
|---|---|---|---|---|---|---|---|
| September 7 | 6:00 p.m. | at Navy | | Navy–Marine Corps Memorial Stadium; Annapolis, MD | ESPN | W 55–3 | 0 |
| September 26 | 8:15 p.m. | Troy | No. 18 | LaVell Edwards Stadium; Provo, UT | ESPN | W 48–7 | 0 |
| October 2 | 7:00 p.m. | Louisiana Tech | No. 22 | LaVell Edwards Stadium; Provo, UT | ESPN2 | W 45–14 | 0 |
| October 10 | 1:30 p.m. | UTSA^{†} | No. 15 | LaVell Edwards Stadium; Provo, UT | ESPN2 | W 27–20 | 0 |
| October 16 | 7:40 p.m. | at Houston | No. 14 | TDECU Stadium; Houston, TX | ESPN | W 43–26 | 10,092 |
| October 24 | 8:15 p.m. | Texas State | No. 12 | LaVell Edwards Stadium; Provo, UT | ESPN | W 52–14 | 6,570 |
| October 31 | 8:15 p.m. | Western Kentucky | No. 11 | LaVell Edwards Stadium; Provo, UT | ESPN | W 41–10 | 6,843 |
| November 6 | 7:45 p.m. | at No. 21 Boise State | No. 9 | Albertsons Stadium; Boise, ID | FS1 | W 51–17 | 1,100 |
| November 21 | 1:00 p.m. | North Alabama | No. 8 | LaVell Edwards Stadium; Provo, UT | BYUtv/ESPN3 | W 66–14 | 936 |
| December 5 | 3:30 p.m. | at No. 18 Coastal Carolina | No. 13 | Brooks Stadium; Conway, SC (College GameDay) | ESPNU | L 17–22 | 5,000 |
| December 12 | 8:00 p.m. | San Diego State | No. 18 | LaVell Edwards Stadium; Provo, UT | ESPN2 | W 28–14 | 0 |
| December 22 | 5:00 p.m. | vs. UCF | No. 16 | FAU Stadium; Boca Raton, FL (Boca Raton Bowl) | ESPN | W 49–23 | 6,000 |
^{†}Homecoming; Rankings from AP Poll and CFP Rankings after November 24 released prior to game; All times are in Mountain time

== Rankings ==
Ranking movements Legend: ██ Increase in ranking ██ Decrease in ranking — = Not ranked
| | Week | | | | | | | | | | | | | | | | | |
| Poll | Pre | 1 | 2 | 3 | 4 | 5 | 6 | 7 | 8 | 9 | 10 | 11 | 12 | 13 | 14 | 15 | 16 | Final |
|---|---|---|---|---|---|---|---|---|---|---|---|---|---|---|---|---|---|---|
| AP | — | —* | 21 | 18 | 22 | 15 | 14 | 12 | 11 | 9 | 8 | 8 | 8 | 8 | 14 | 14 | 13 | 11 |
| Coaches | — | —* | 22 | 23 | 22 | 15 | 13 | 11 | 10 | 9 | 8 | 8 | 8 | 8 | 16 | 16 | 15 | 11 |
| CFP | Not released | | | | | | | | | | | | 14 | 13 | 18 | 17 | 16 | Not released |

== Broadcasting team ==
The NuSkin BYU Sports Network is owned and operated by BYU Radio. The network features Greg Wrubell (play-by-play), Riley Nelson (analyst), Mitchell Juergens (reporter/sideline analyst), and Jason Shepherd (host). The network is in charge of producing and broadcasting all BYU Football pre- and post- game shows, coaches shows, and live broadcasts. The network also does the radio portion of BYU Football Media Day, but the 2020 Media Day was canceled due to COVID-19.

=== Affiliates ===
These affiliate stations broadcast the shows live as part of the network simulcast.

- BYU Radio – Flagship Station Nationwide (Dish Network 980, Sirius XM 143, KBYU 89.1 FM HD 2, TuneIn radio, and byuradio.org)
- KSL 102.7 FM and 1160 AM – (Salt Lake City / Provo, Utah and ksl.com)
- KSNA – Blackfoot / Idaho Falls / Pocatello / Rexburg, Idaho (games)
- KSPZ – Blackfoot / Idaho Falls / Pocatello / Rexburg, Idaho (coaches' shows)
- KMXD – Monroe / Manti, Utah
- KSVC – Richfield / Manti, Utah
- KDXU – St. George, Utah

== Personnel ==
=== Coaching staff ===
| Name | Position |
|---|---|
| Kalani Sitake | Head coach |
| Ed Lamb | Assistant head coach/special teams/linebackers coach |
| Jeff Grimes | Offensive coordinator |
| Eric Mateos | Offensive line coach |
| Fesi Sitake | Wide receivers coach |
| Steve Clark | Tight end coach |
| Aaron Roderick | Passing game coordinator/quarterbacks coach |
| Ilaisa Tuiaki | Defensive coordinator/defensive line coach |
| Preston Hadley | Safeties coach |
| Jernaro Gilford | Cornerbacks coach |
| Harvey Unga | Running backs coach |

=== Roster ===
2020 BYU Cougars football team roster
Players
Coaches
Offense

| Pos. | # | Name | Class |
|---|---|---|---|
| QB | 17 | Jacob Conover | Fr |
| QB | 3 | Jaren Hall (injured) | So |
| QB | 10 | Mason Fakahua | Fr |
| QB | 10 | Sol-Jay Maiava-Peters | Fr |
| QB | 19 | Rhett Reilly | So |
| QB | 16 | Baylor Romney | So |
| QB | 1 | Zach Wilson | Jr |
| OL | 56 | Clark Barrington | So |
| OL | 65 | Chandler Bird | Fr |
| OL | 67 | Brady Christensen | Jr |
| OL | 66 | James Empey | Jr |
| OL | 71 | Blake Freeland | So |
| OL | 77 | Chandon Herring | Sr |
| OL | 69 | Tristen Hoge | Sr |
| OL | 64 | Brayden Keim | Fr |
| OL | 76 | Harris LaChance | So |
| OL | 74 | Kieffer Longson | Sr |
| OL | 75 | Burke Parker | Fr |
| OL | 70 | Connor Pay | Fr |
| OL | 61 | Keanu Saleapaga | Jr |
| OL | 63 | Joe Tukuafu | Jr |
| OL | 68 | Mo Unutoa | Jr |
| OL | 72 | Seth Willis | Fr |
| RB | 25 | Tyler Allgeier | So |
| RB | 30 | Luc Andrada | Fr |
| RB | 10 | Javelle Brown | Fr |
| RB | 19 | Miles Davis | Fr |
| RB | 43 | Theo Dawson | So |
| RB | 20 | Sione Finau | So |
| RB | 4 | Lopini Katoa | Jr |
| RB | 21 | Jackson McChesney (injured) | Fr |
| RB | 7 | Hinckley Ropati (injured) | So |
| RB | 45 | Chase Wester | Jr |
| TE | 89 | Matt Bushman (injured) | Sr |
| TE | 42 | Kyle Griffitts | Sr |
| TE | 82 | Bentley Hanshaw | Fr |
| TE | 80 | Lane Lunt | Jr |
| TE | 83 | Isaac Rex | Fr |
| TE | 35 | Ben Tuipulotu | Fr |
| TE | 35 | Hank Tuipulotu | So |
| TE | 13 | Masen Wake | So |
| TE | 96 | Carter Wheat | Fr |
| WR | 31 | Jacob Boren | Fr |
| WR | 27 | Chayce Bolli | Fr |
| WR | 85 | Brayden Cosper | So |
| WR | 0 | Kody Epps | Fr |
| WR | 88 | Terence Fall | Fr |
| WR | 36 | Talmage Gunther | Fr |
| WR | 86 | Keanu Hill | Fr |
| WR | 82 | Chris Jackson | Jr |
| WR | 5 | Dax Milne | Jr |
| WR | 15 | Kade Moore | Fr |
| WR | 13 | Joe Nelson | Fr |
| WR | 26 | Hobbs Nyborg | Fr |
| WR | 2 | Neil Pau'u | Jr |
| WR | 18 | Gunner Romney | Jr |

Defense

| Pos. | # | Name | Class |
|---|---|---|---|
| DB | 25 | Samuel Allred | Sr |
| DB | 23 | Zayne Anderson | Sr |
| DB | 15 | Caleb Christensen | Fr |
| DB | 2 | Keenan Ellis | Jr |
| DB | 27 | Tavita Gagnier | Fr |
| DB | 22 | Ammon Hannemann | Fr |
| DB | 1 | Micah Harper | Fr |
| DB | 11 | Isaiah Herron | So |
| DB | 43 | Jared Kapisi | Sr |
| DB | 20 | Hayden Livingston | So |
| DB | 16 | D'Angelo Mandell | Jr |
| DB | 28 | Jason Money | Jr |
| DB | 12 | Malik Moore | Jr |
| DB | 26 | Mitchell Price | Jr |
| DB | 10 | Morgan Pyper | So |
| DB | 20 | Ethan Slade | Fr |
| DB | 28 | Petey Tuipulotu | Fr |
| DB | 7 | George Udo | So |
| DB | 4 | Troy Warner | Sr |
| DB | 32 | Chris Wilcox | Sr |
| DB | 29 | Shamon Willis | Jr |
| DB | 13 | Jaques Wilson (injured) | Jr |
| DB | 37 | Wes Wright | So |
| DL | 92 | Tyler Batty (injured) | Fr |
| DL | 99 | Zac Dawe | Sr |
| DL | 93 | Bracken El-Bakri | Sr |
| DL | 55 | Lorenzo Fauatea (injured) | Jr |
| DL | 44 | Seleti Fevaleaki | Fr |
| DL | 75 | JT Gentry | So |
| DL | 73 | Caden Haws | Fr |
| DL | 59 | Fisher Jackson | Fr |
| DL | 21 | Hirkley Latu | So |
| DL | 58 | Uriah Leiataua | Sr |
| DL | 94 | Freddy Livai | Fr |
| DL | 62 | Atunaisa Mahe (injured) | So |
| DL | 48 | Alex Muti | Fr |
| DL | 90 | Jacob Palu | Fr |
| DL | 88 | Alema Pilimai | So |
| DL | 78 | Andrew Slack | Fr |
| DL | 98 | Gabe Summers | So |
| DL | 57 | Alden Tofa | Jr |
| DL | 95 | Khyiris Tonga | Sr |
| DL | 51 | Jeddy Tuiloma | Sr |
| DL | 91 | Earl Tuioti-Mariner | Jr |
| LB | 3 | Chaz Ah You (injured) | Jr |
| LB | 59 | Truman Andrus | Fr |
| LB | 33 | Ben Bywater (injured) | Fr |
| LB | 17 | Matthew Criddle | Jr |
| LB | 34 | Kavika Fonua | Sr |
| LB | 54 | Chase Hughes | So |
| LB | 46 | Drew Jensen | So |
| LB | 53 | Isaiah Kaufusi | Sr |
| LB | 38 | Jackson Kaufusi | So |
| LB | 50 | Sam Lee | Sr |
| LB | 52 | Preston Lewis | Fr |
| LB | 41 | Keenan Pili | So |
| LB | 47 | Pepe Tanuvasa | Jr |
| LB | 94 | Kade Pupunu | Fr |
| LB | 31 | Max Tooley | So |
| LB | 49 | Payton Wilgar | So |
| LB | 52 | Josh Wilson | Fr |

Special teams

| Pos. | # | Name | Class |
|---|---|---|---|
| DS | 87 | Britton Hogan | So |
| DS | 84 | Austin Riggs | Fr |
| P | 24 | Ryan Rehkow | Fr |
| K | 39 | Jake Oldroyd | Jr |
| K | 97 | Justen Smith | Fr |

Head coach

- Kalani Sitake (BYU)

Coordinators/assistant coaches

- Ed Lamb (BYU)
  Assistant head coach, Special Teams, Linebackers
- Jeff Grimes (UTEP)
  Offensive coordinator
- Aaron Roderick (BYU)
  Passing Game Coordintor/quarterbacks
- Eric Mateos (Southwest Baptist)
  Offensive line
- Fesi Sitake (Southern Utah)
  Wide receivers
- Steve Clark (BYU)
  Tight ends
- Harvey Unga (BYU)
  Running backs
- Ilaisa Tuiaki (Southern Utah)
  Defensive coordinator, Defensive line
- Jernaro Gilford (BYU)
  Cornerbacks
- Preston Hadley (BYU)
  Safeties
- Nu'u Tafisi (California)
  Director of strength and conditioning
- Justin McClure (Northern Colorado)
  Football strength and conditioning coach
- AJ Middleton (Redlands)
  Football strength and conditioning coach
- Jon Swift (BYU)
  Director of football operations
- Jack Damuni (BYU)
  Executive coordinator of On-campus Recruiting and Community/Player Relations
- Jasen Ah You (BYU)
  Executive coordinator of Recruiting and Player Personnel
- Matt Mitchell (Wheaton (IL))
  Offensive Graduate Assistant
- Spencer Patterson (Utah Tech)
  Offensive Graduate Assistant
- Tanner Jacobson (BYU)
  Defensive Graduate Assistant
- Gavin Fowler (BYU)
  Defensive Graduate Assistant

Legend

- (C) Team captain
- (S) Suspended
- (I) Ineligible
- Injured
- Redshirt

Roster

=== Depth chart ===
Defense

FS
Zayne Anderson
George Udo
Jared Kapisi

| WLB | MLB | SLB |
|---|---|---|
| Isaiah Kaufusi | Kavika Fonua | Payton Wilgar |
| Keenan Pili | Pepe Tanuvasa | Max Tooley |
| Drew Jensen | Josh Wilson | Jackson Kaufusi |

SS
Troy Warner
Matt Criddle
Morgan Pyper

CB
Chris Wilcox
D'Angelo Mandell
Shamon Willis

| DE | DT | DT | DE |
|---|---|---|---|
| Zac Dawe | Khyiris Tonga | Bracken El-Bakri | Uriah Leiataua |
| Seleti Fevaleaki | Caden Haws | Earl Tuioti-Mariner | Alden Tofa |
| Fisher Jackson | Jeddy Tuiloma | Gabe Summers | Alema Pilimai |

CB
Keenan Ellis
Micah Harper
Isaiah Herron

Offense

X-Receiver
Dax Milne
Gunner Romney
Chris Jackson

| LT | LG | C | RG | RT |
|---|---|---|---|---|
| Brady Christensen | Clark Barrington | James Empey | Tristen Hoge | Chandon Herring |
| Keanu Saleapaga | Keiffer Longson | Joe Tukuafu | Chandon Herring | Blake Freeland |
| Brayden Keim | Keanu Saleapaga | Connor Pay | Seth Willis | Harris LaChance |

TE
Isaac Rex
Carter Wheat
Lane Lunt

Z-Receiver
Neil Pau'u
Braydon Cosper
Keanu Hill

QB
Zach Wilson
Baylor Romney
Sol-Jay Maiava-Peters

Key reserves
DB Hayden Livingston
WR Talmage Gunther
RB Miles Davis
WR Kody Epps
DB Malik Moore
DB Caleb Christensen
DB Tavita Gagnier
LB Kade Pupunu

RB
Tyler Allgeier
Lopini Katoa
Sione Finau

FB
Masen Wake
Kyle Griffitts
Chase Wester

Special teams
PK Jake Oldroyd
PK Justen Smith
P Ryan Rehkow
P Jake Oldroyd
KR Miles Davis
KR Caleb Christnesen
PR Hobbs Nyborg
PR Talmage Gunther
LS Britton Hogan
LS Austin Riggs
H Hayden Livingston
H Ryan Rehkow

== Game summaries ==
=== Navy ===
BYU at Navy

| Team | 1 | 2 | 3 | 4 | Total |
|---|---|---|---|---|---|
| • Cougars | 14 | 17 | 17 | 7 | 55 |
| Midshipmen | 0 | 0 | 3 | 0 | 3 |

- Date: September 7
- Location: Navy-Marine Corps Memorial Stadium
  Annapolis, Maryland
- Game start: 8:08 p.m. EDT
- Elapsed time: 3:15
- Game attendance: 0
- Game weather: 75 °F (24 °C), Winds S 5 mph; Clear
- Referee: Kevin Mar • Umpire: Christian Watson • Linesman: Jay Bilbo • Line judge: Mark Estemyer • Back judge: Bobby Lynn • Field judge: Jason Ledet • Side judge: Mario Seneca • Center judge: Dan Scanlan
- TV announcers (ESPN): Rece Davis, Kirk Herbstreit, and Allison Williams

Uniform combination: white helmets, white jersey, white pants w/ royal blue accents

Scoring summary

| Quarter | Time | Drive | | | Team | Scoring information | Score | |
| Quarter | Time | Plays | Yards | TOP | Team | Scoring information | BYU | NAVY |
|---|---|---|---|---|---|---|---|---|
| 1 | 10:07 | 7 | 74 | 2:49 | BYU | Tyler Allgeier 34-yard touchdown run, Jake Oldroyd kick good | 7 | 0 |
| 1 | 7:16 | 3 | 52 | 1:27 | BYU | Lopini Katoa 39-yard touchdown run, Jake Oldroyd kick good | 14 | 0 |
| 2 | 13:31 | 8 | 89 | 4:14 | BYU | Lopini Katoa 15-yard touchdown reception from Zach Wilson, Jake Oldroyd kick good | 21 | 0 |
| 2 | 5:00 | 11 | 43 | 6:46 | BYU | 22-yard field goal by Jake Oldroyd | 24 | 0 |
| 2 | 0:08 | 10 | 56 | 2:35 | BYU | Lopini Katoa 1-yard touchdown run, Jake Oldroyd kick good | 31 | 0 |
| 3 | 13:05 | 4 | 83 | 1:55 | BYU | Gunner Romney 45-yard touchdown reception from Zach Wilson, Jake Oldroyd kick good | 38 | 0 |
| 3 | 7:10 | 4 | 80 | 2:05 | BYU | Tyler Allgeier 17-yard touchdown run, Jake Oldroyd kick good | 45 | 0 |
| 3 | 3:09 | 7 | 33 | 3:06 | BYU | 34-yard field goal by Jake Oldroyd | 48 | 0 |
| 3 | 0:54 | 6 | 44 | 2:15 | NAVY | 48-yard field goal by Bijan Nichols | 48 | 3 |
| 4 | 7:26 | 6 | 43 | 3:49 | BYU | Jack McChesney 9-yard touchdown run, Jake Oldroyd kick good | 55 | 3 |
| "TOP" = time of possession. For other American football terms, see Glossary of American football. | | | | | | | 55 | 3 |

| Statistics | BYU | Navy |
|---|---|---|
| First downs | 28 | 7 |
| Plays–yards | 71–580 | 47–149 |
| Rushes–yards | 49–301 | 39–119 |
| Passing yards | 279 | 30 |
| Passing: comp–att–int | 16–22–1 | 4–8–0 |
| Turnovers | | |
| Time of possession | 37:20 | 22:40 |

| Team | Category | Player | Statistics |
|---|---|---|---|
| BYU | Passing | Zach Wilson | 13–18–1, 232 yards, 2 TD's |
| BYU | Rushing | Tyler Allgeier | 14 rushes, 132 yards, 2 TD's |
| BYU | Receiving | Gunner Romney | 4 receptions, 134 yards, 1 TD |
| Navy | Passing | Dalen Morris | 2–4–0, 16 yards, 0 TD's |
| Navy | Rushing | Myles Fells | 3 carries, 55 yards |
| Navy | Receiving | Mark Walker | 2 receptions, 20 yards |

=== Troy ===
Troy at BYU

| Team | 1 | 2 | 3 | 4 | Total |
|---|---|---|---|---|---|
| Trojans | 0 | 7 | 0 | 0 | 7 |
| • #18/23 Cougars | 7 | 17 | 14 | 10 | 48 |

- Date: September 26
- Location: LaVell Edwards Stadium
  Provo, Utah
- Game start: 8:20 p.m. MDT
- Elapsed time: 3:09
- Game attendance: 0
- Game weather: 64 °F (18 °C), Winds NW 9 mph; Sunny
- Referee: Marshall Lewis • Umpire: Ryan Aulds • Linesman: Seth Bussey • Line judge: Terry Allgeier • Back judge: Kevin Mitchell • Field judge: Clay Brownlee • Side judge: Brett Toney • Center judge: Greg LeFils Jr.
- TV announcers (ESPN): Dave Flemming, Rod Gilmore, and Stormy Buonantony

Uniform combination: white helmets, royal blue jersey, royal blue pants w/ white accents

Scoring summary

| Quarter | Time | Drive | | | Team | Scoring information | Score | |
| Quarter | Time | Plays | Yards | TOP | Team | Scoring information | TROY | BYU |
|---|---|---|---|---|---|---|---|---|
| 1 | 1:26 | 8 | 64 | 7:08 | BYU | Masen Wake 1-yard touchdown run, Jake Oldroyd kick good | 0 | 7 |
| 2 | 11:03 | 8 | 74 | 2:51 | BYU | Zach Wilson 1-yard touchdown run, Jake Oldroyd kick good | 0 | 14 |
| 2 | 1:49 | 7 | 87 | 3:30 | BYU | Isaac Rex 10-yard touchdown reception from Zach Wilson, Jake Oldroyd kick good | 0 | 21 |
| 2 | 1:05 | 7 | 75 | 0:44 | TROY | B.J. Smith 2-yard touchdown run, Evan Legassey kick good | 7 | 21 |
| 2 | 0:00 | 6 | 41 | 0:59 | BYU | 54-yard field goal by Jake Oldroyd | 7 | 24 |
| 3 | 14:27 | 2 | 75 | 0:33 | BYU | Dax Milne 70-yard touchdown reception from Zach Wilson, Jake Oldroyd kick good | 7 | 31 |
| 3 | 3:50 | 7 | 64 | 3:27 | BYU | Zach Wilson 2-yard touchdown run, Jake Oldroyd kick good | 7 | 38 |
| 4 | 14:54 | 6 | 60 | 2:02 | BYU | Masen Wake 10-yard touchdown run, Jake Oldroyd kick good | 7 | 45 |
| 4 | 7:30 | 11 | 63 | 6:16 | BYU | 54-yard field goal by Jake Oldroyd | 7 | 48 |
| "TOP" = time of possession. For other American football terms, see Glossary of American football. | | | | | | | 7 | 48 |

| Statistics | TROY | BYU |
|---|---|---|
| First downs | 8 | 33 |
| Plays–yards | 54–181 | 83–664 |
| Rushes–yards | 18–19 | 48–192 |
| Passing yards | 162 | 472 |
| Passing: comp–att–int | 21–36–0 | 28–35–0 |
| Turnovers | | |
| Time of possession | 15:48 | 44:12 |

| Team | Category | Player | Statistics |
|---|---|---|---|
| TROY | Passing | Gunnar Watson | 21–33–0, 162 yards |
| TROY | Rushing | Kimani Vidal | 4 rushes, 23 yards |
| TROY | Receiving | Tray Eafford | 2 recepeptions, 59 yards |
| BYU | Passing | Zach Wilson | 23–28–0, 392 yards, 2 TD's |
| BYU | Rushing | Lopini Katoa | 11 rushes, 76 yards |
| BYU | Receiving | Dax Milne | 7 receptions, 140 yards, 1 TD |

=== Louisiana Tech ===
Louisiana Tech at BYU

| Team | 1 | 2 | 3 | 4 | Total |
|---|---|---|---|---|---|
| Bulldogs | 7 | 0 | 0 | 7 | 14 |
| • #22/22 Cougars | 7 | 21 | 10 | 7 | 45 |

- Date: October 2
- Location: LaVell Edwards Stadium
  Provo, Utah
- Game start: 7:05 p.m. MDT
- Elapsed time: 3:23
- Game attendance: 0
- Game weather: 68 °F (20 °C), Winds NW 4 mph; Mostly Clear
- Referee: David Alvarez • Umpire: Mark Warner • Linesman: John Braun • Line judge: Jeff Hutcheon • Back judge: Brian Ernest • Field judge: Matt Mills • Side judge: Rick Ockey • Center judge: Ian Malepeai
- TV announcers (ESPN2): Dave Flemming, Andre Ware, and Stormy Buonantony

Uniform combination: white helmets, royal blue jersey w/ white accents, white pants w/ royal blue accents

Scoring summary

| Quarter | Time | Drive | | | Team | Scoring information | Score | |
| Quarter | Time | Plays | Yards | TOP | Team | Scoring information | Tech | BYU |
|---|---|---|---|---|---|---|---|---|
| 1 | 10:02 | 6 | 78 | 2:57 | BYU | Zach Wilson 9-yard touchdown run, Jake Oldroyd kick good | 0 | 7 |
| 1 | 6:51 | 6 | 82 | 3:04 | Tech | Smoke Harris 66-yard touchdown reception from Luke Anthony, Jacob Barnes kick good | 7 | 7 |
| 2 | 10:34 | 6 | 58 | 3:03 | BYU | Carter Wheat 22-yard touchdown reception from Zach Wilson, Jake Oldroyd kick good | 7 | 14 |
| 2 | 5:15 | 9 | 58 | 3:30 | BYU | Tyler Allgeier 1-yard touchdown run, Jake Oldroyd kick good | 7 | 21 |
| 2 | 0:59 | 5 | 80 | 0:37 | BYU | Gunner Romney 22-yard touchdown reception from Zach Wilson, Jake Oldroyd kick good | 7 | 28 |
| 3 | 11:35 | 7 | 75 | 3:25 | BYU | Zach Wilson 1-yard touchdown run, Jake Oldroyd kick good | 7 | 35 |
| 3 | 7:19 | 6 | 26 | 1:41 | BYU | 45-yard field goal by Jake Oldroyd | 7 | 38 |
| 4 | 13:25 | 10 | 71 | 5:01 | BYU | Zach Wilson 14-yard touchdown run, Jake Oldroyd kick good | 7 | 45 |
| 4 | 4:58 | 17 | 75 | 8:27 | Tech | Smoke Harris 4-yard touchdown reception from Luke Anthony, Jacob Barnes kick good | 14 | 45 |
| "TOP" = time of possession. For other American football terms, see Glossary of American football. | | | | | | | 14 | 45 |

| Statistics | Tech | BYU |
|---|---|---|
| First downs | 18 | 36 |
| Plays–yards | 63–313 | 64–513 |
| Rushes–yards | 30–74 | 38–188 |
| Passing yards | 239 | 325 |
| Passing: comp–att–int | 22–33–2 | 24–26–0 |
| Turnovers | | |
| Time of possession | 30:11 | 29:49 |

| Team | Category | Player | Statistics |
|---|---|---|---|
| Tech | Passing | Luke Anthony | 18–27–1, 191 yards, 2 TD's |
| Tech | Rushing | Justin Henderson | 13 rushes, 29 yards |
| Tech | Receiving | Smoke Harris | 3 receptions, 82 yards, 2 TD's |
| BYU | Passing | Zach Wilson | 24–26–0, 325 yards, 2 TD's |
| BYU | Rushing | Tyler Allgeier | 10 rushes, 93 yards, 1 TD |
| BYU | Receiving | Gunner Romney | 7 receptions, 101 yards, 1 TD |

=== UTSA ===
Homecoming: UTSA at BYU

| Team | 1 | 2 | 3 | 4 | Total |
|---|---|---|---|---|---|
| Roadrunners | 3 | 0 | 3 | 14 | 20 |
| • #15/15 Cougars | 0 | 14 | 7 | 6 | 27 |

- Date: October 10
- Location: LaVell Edwards Stadium
  Provo, Utah
- Game start: 1:58 p.m. MDT
- Elapsed time: 3:12
- Game attendance: 0
- Game weather: 78 °F (26 °C), Winds NW 8 mph; Sunny
- Referee: Scott Campbell • Umpire: Christian Watson • Linesman: John Braun • Line judge: Jeff Hutcheon • Back judge: Tyree Walton • Field judge: Matt Mills • Side judge: Rick Ockey • Center judge: Ian Malepeai
- TV announcers (ESPN2): Anish Shroff, Tom Luginbill, and Taylor McGregor

Uniform combination: white helmets, navy blue jersey w/ white accents, white pants w/ navy blue accents

Scoring summary

| Quarter | Time | Drive | | | Team | Scoring information | Score | |
| Quarter | Time | Plays | Yards | TOP | Team | Scoring information | UTSA | BYU |
|---|---|---|---|---|---|---|---|---|
| 1 | 4:55 | 8 | 38 | 2:54 | UTSA | 39-yard field goal by Hunter Duplessis | 3 | 0 |
| 2 | 13:41 | 11 | 75 | 6:14 | BYU | Neil Pau'u 4-yard touchdown reception from Zach Wilson, Justen Smith kick good | 3 | 7 |
| 2 | 4:44 | 5 | 45 | 2:33 | BYU | Lopini Katoa 11-yard touchdown reception from Zach Wilson, Justen Smith kick good | 3 | 14 |
| 3 | 4:55 | 10 | 56 | 3:59 | UTSA | 36-yard field goal by Hunter Duplessis | 6 | 14 |
| 3 | 1:04 | 7 | 90 | 3:03 | BYU | Zach Wilson 4-yard touchdown run, Justen Smith kick good | 6 | 21 |
| 4 | 14:26 | 5 | 65 | 1:26 | UTSA | Zakhari Franklin 32-yard touchdown reception from Lowell Narcisse, Hunter Duplessis kick good | 13 | 21 |
| 4 | 2:18 | 12 | 80 | 6:11 | BYU | Tyler Allgeier 6-yard touchdown run, Justen Smith kick failed | 13 | 27 |
| 4 | 1:17 | 4 | 75 | 1:01 | UTSA | Brennon Dingle 34-yard touchdown reception from Lowell Narcisse, Hunter Duplessis kick good | 20 | 27 |
| "TOP" = time of possession. For other American football terms, see Glossary of American football. | | | | | | | 20 | 27 |

| Statistics | UTSA | BYU |
|---|---|---|
| First downs | 17 | 22 |
| Plays–yards | 61–359 | 68–470 |
| Rushes–yards | 28–72 | 38–178 |
| Passing yards | 287 | 292 |
| Passing: comp–att–int | 24–33–1 | 22–30–0 |
| Turnovers | | |
| Time of possession | 26:58 | 33:02 |

| Team | Category | Player | Statistics |
|---|---|---|---|
| UTSA | Passing | Lowell Narcisse | 17–20–0, 229 yards, 2 TD's |
| UTSA | Rushing | Sincere McCormick | 11 rushes, 42 yards |
| UTSA | Receiving | Zakhari Franklin | 7 receptions, 79 yards, 1 TD |
| BYU | Passing | Zach Wilson | 22–30–0, 292 yards, 2 TD's |
| BYU | Rushing | Tyler Allgeier | 19 rushes, 116 yards, 1 TD |
| BYU | Receiving | Dax Milne | 7 receptions, 102 yards |

=== Houston ===
BYU at Houston

| Team | 1 | 2 | 3 | 4 | Total |
|---|---|---|---|---|---|
| • #14/13 BYU Cougars | 14 | 0 | 7 | 22 | 43 |
| UH Cougars | 3 | 17 | 6 | 0 | 26 |

- Date: October 16
- Location: TDECU Stadium
  Houston, Texas
- Game start: 8:40 p.m. CDT
- Elapsed time: 3:43
- Game attendance: 10,092
- Game weather: 58 °F (14 °C), Winds E 3 mph; Mostly cloudy
- Referee: Kevin Mar • Umpire: Sheldon Davis • Linesman: Bradford Edwards • Line judge: Derek Anderson • Back judge: Joel Wetzel • Field judge: Randy Smith • Side judge: Fulton Carson • Center judge: Stacy Hardin
- TV announcers (ESPN): Jason Benetti, Andre Ware, and Kris Budden

Uniform combination: white helmets, white jersey, royal blue pants w/ white accents

Scoring summary

| Quarter | Time | Drive | | | Team | Scoring information | Score | |
| Quarter | Time | Plays | Yards | TOP | Team | Scoring information | BYU | UH |
|---|---|---|---|---|---|---|---|---|
| 1 | 9:53 | 10 | 65 | 5:07 | UH | 27-yard field goal by Dalton Witherspoon | 0 | 3 |
| 1 | 9:34 | 1 | 78 | 0:19 | BYU | Dax Milne 78-yard touchdown reception from Zach Wilson, Jake Oldroyd kick good | 7 | 3 |
| 1 | 4:42 | 7 | 85 | 3:23 | BYU | Lopini Katoa 1-yard touchdown run, Jake Oldroyd kick good | 14 | 3 |
| 2 | 9:01 | 8 | 91 | 4:01 | UH | Christian Trahan 20-yard touchdown reception from Clayton Tune, Dalton Witherspoon kick good | 14 | 10 |
| 2 | 4:42 | 7 | 61 | 3:32 | UH | Tank Dell 5-yard touchdown reception from Clayton Tune, Dalton Witherspoon kick good | 14 | 17 |
| 2 | 0:00 | 8 | 55 | 0:28 | UH | 49-yard field goal by Dalton Witherspoon | 14 | 20 |
| 3 | 3:05 | 16 | 98 | 6:48 | UH | Clayton Tune 5-yard touchdown run, 2-point Clayton Tune pass intercepted | 14 | 26 |
| 3 | 9:34 | 5 | 75 | 2:12 | BYU | Dax Milne 2-yard touchdown reception from Zach Wilson, Jake Oldroyd kick good | 21 | 26 |
| 4 | 10:35 | 3 | 23 | 1:13 | BYU | Masen Wake 8-yard touchdown reception from Zach Wilson, 2-point pass to Tyler Allgeier good | 29 | 26 |
| 4 | 3:06 | 6 | 57 | 1:37 | BYU | Dax Milne 18-yard touchdown reception from Zach Wilson, Jake Oldroyd kick good | 36 | 26 |
| 4 | 4:42 | 2 | 17 | 0:13 | BYU | Tyler Allgeier 14-yard touchdown run, Jake Oldroyd kick good | 43 | 26 |
| "TOP" = time of possession. For other American football terms, see Glossary of American football. | | | | | | | 43 | 26 |

| Statistics | BYU | UH |
|---|---|---|
| First downs | 23 | 26 |
| Plays–yards | 59–478 | 77–438 |
| Rushes–yards | 24–78 | 44–128 |
| Passing yards | 400 | 310 |
| Passing: comp–att–int | 25–35–0 | 21–31–0 |
| Turnovers | | |
| Time of possession | 25:48 | 34:12 |

| Team | Category | Player | Statistics |
|---|---|---|---|
| BYU | Passing | Zach Wilson | 25–35–0, 400 yards, 4 TD's |
| BYU | Rushing | Zach Wilson | 9 rushes, 40 yards |
| BYU | Receiving | Dax Milne | 9 receptions, 184 yards, 3 TD's |
| UH | Passing | Clayton Tune | 21–31–0, 310 yards, 2 TD's |
| UH | Rushing | Kyle Porter | 20 rushes, 94 yards |
| UH | Receiving | Christian Trahan | 3 receptions, 69 yards, 1 TD |

=== Texas State ===
Texas State at BYU

| Team | 1 | 2 | 3 | 4 | Total |
|---|---|---|---|---|---|
| Bobcats | 7 | 0 | 0 | 7 | 14 |
| • #12/11 Cougars | 14 | 21 | 14 | 3 | 52 |

- Date: October 24
- Location: LaVell Edwards Stadium
  Provo, Utah
- Game start: 8:25 p.m. MDT
- Elapsed time: 3:12
- Game attendance: 6,570
- Game weather: 57 °F (14 °C), Winds SW 2 mph; Partly cloudy
- Referee: Michael Vandervelde • Umpire: Mark Warner • Linesman: John Braun • Line judge: Matt Burks • Back judge: Tyree Walton • Field judge: Matt Mills • Side judge: Rick Ockey • Center judge: Ian Malepeai
- TV announcers (ESPN): Dave Flemming, Rod Gilmore, and Stormy Buonantony

Uniform combination: white helmet, navy jersey w/ white trims and numbers, navy pants w/ white trims

Scoring summary

| Quarter | Time | Drive | | | Team | Scoring information | Score | |
| Quarter | Time | Plays | Yards | TOP | Team | Scoring information | TXST | BYU |
|---|---|---|---|---|---|---|---|---|
| 1 | 11:33 | 8 | 75 | 3:27 | TXST | Marcell Barbee 19-yard touchdown reception from Brady McBride, Seth Keller kick good | 7 | 0 |
| 1 | 7:03 | 10 | 86 | 4:24 | BYU | Lopini Katoa 4-yard touchdown run, Jake Oldroyd kick good | 7 | 7 |
| 1 | 1:43 | 7 | 90 | 3:03 | BYU | Keanu Hill 33-yard touchdown reception from Zach Wilson, Jake Oldroyd kick good | 7 | 14 |
| 2 | 12:35 | 6 | 60 | 2:37 | BYU | Tyler Allgeier 11-yard touchdown run, Jake Oldroyd kick good | 7 | 21 |
| 2 | 7:47 | 11 | 71 | 3:56 | BYU | Isaac Rex 3-yard touchdown reception from Zach Wilson, Jake Oldroyd kick good | 7 | 28 |
| 2 | 0:27 | 7 | 94 | 2:16 | BYU | Dax Milne 45-yard touchdown reception from Zach Wilson, Jake Oldroyd kick good | 7 | 35 |
| 3 | 10:47 | 10 | 75 | 4:13 | BYU | Isaac Rex 30-yard touchdown reception from Zach Wilson, Jake Oldroyd kick good | 7 | 42 |
| 2 | 9:50 | | | | BYU | Interception returned 32 yards for touchdown by Isaiah Kaufusi, Jake Oldroyd kick good | 7 | 49 |
| 4 | 8:09 | 8 | 94 | 4:11 | TXST | Marcell Barbee 30-yard touchdown reception from Brady McBride, Seth Keller kick good | 14 | 49 |
| 4 | 7:19 | 8 | 64 | 3:25 | BYU | 28-yard field goal by Jake Oldroyd | 14 | 52 |
| "TOP" = time of possession. For other American football terms, see Glossary of American football. | | | | | | | 14 | 52 |

| Statistics | TXST | BYU |
|---|---|---|
| First downs | 15 | 30 |
| Plays–yards | 57–267 | 76–579 |
| Rushes–yards | 26–117 | 40–227 |
| Passing yards | 150 | 352 |
| Passing: comp–att–int | 17–31–2 | 25–36–1 |
| Turnovers | | |
| Time of possession | 25:49 | 34:11 |

| Team | Category | Player | Statistics |
|---|---|---|---|
| TXST | Passing | Brady McBride | 17–30–2, 150 yards, 2 TD's |
| TXST | Rushing | Brock Sturges | 8 rushes, 58 yards |
| TXST | Receiving | Marcell Barbee | 3 receptions, 48 yards, 2 TD's |
| BYU | Passing | Zach Wilson | 19–25–1, 287 yards, 4 TD's |
| BYU | Rushing | Tyler Allgeier | 12 rushes, 76 yards, 1 TD |
| BYU | Receiving | Dax Milne | 4 receptions, 89 yards, 1 TD |

=== Western Kentucky ===
Western Kentucky at BYU

| Team | 1 | 2 | 3 | 4 | Total |
|---|---|---|---|---|---|
| Hilltoppers | 3 | 0 | 7 | 0 | 10 |
| • #11/10 Cougars | 14 | 21 | 3 | 3 | 41 |

- Date: October 31
- Location: LaVell Edwards Stadium
  Provo, Utah
- Game start: 8:20 p.m. MDT
- Elapsed time: 3:18
- Game attendance: 6,843
- Game weather: 49 °F (9 °C), Winds NW 5 mph; Partly cloudy
- Referee: Kevin Hassell • Umpire: Apollo Martin • Linesman: Al Green • Line judge: Derek Anderson • Back judge: Joel Wetzel • Field judge: Ed Vinzant • Side judge: Steve Heiman • Center judge: Stacy Hardin
- TV announcers (ESPN): Beth Mowins, Kirk Morrison, and Stormy Buonantony

Uniform combination: white helmet, white jersey w/ navy trims and numbers, white pants w/ navy trims; pink gloves, socks, and long sleeves optional (Breast Cancer Survivor game)

Scoring summary

| Quarter | Time | Drive | | | Team | Scoring information | Score | |
| Quarter | Time | Plays | Yards | TOP | Team | Scoring information | WKU | BYU |
|---|---|---|---|---|---|---|---|---|
| 1 | 10:38 | 10 | 75 | 4:22 | BYU | Tyler Allgeier 2-yard touchdown run, Jake Oldroyd kick good | 0 | 7 |
| 1 | 7:19 | 14 | 49 | 8:14 | WKU | 44-yard field goal by Brayden Narveson | 3 | 7 |
| 1 | 0:22 | 6 | 75 | 2:02 | BYU | Dax Milne 23-yard touchdown reception from Zach Wilson, Jake Oldroyd kick good | 3 | 14 |
| 2 | 12:45 | 8 | 39 | 2:27 | BYU | Zach Wilson 5-yard touchdown run, Jake Oldroyd kick good | 3 | 21 |
| 2 | 7:44 | 5 | 84 | 2:11 | BYU | Lopini Katoa 42-yard touchdown reception from Zach Wilson, Jake Oldroyd kick good | 3 | 28 |
| 2 | 0:16 | 15 | 88 | 4:20 | BYU | Isaac Rex 4-yard touchdown reception from Zach Wilson, Jake Oldroyd kick good | 3 | 35 |
| 3 | 3:09 | 1 | 3 | 0:04 | WKU | Joshua Simon 3-yard touchdown reception from Tyrrell Pigrome, Brayden Narveson kick good | 10 | 35 |
| 3 | 0:00 | 9 | 43 | 3:09 | BYU | 49-yard field goal by Jake Oldroyd | 10 | 38 |
| 4 | 0:58 | 11 | 42 | 5:01 | BYU | 45-yard field goal by Jake Oldroyd | 10 | 41 |
| "TOP" = time of possession. For other American football terms, see Glossary of American football. | | | | | | | | |

| Statistics | WKU | BYU |
|---|---|---|
| First downs | 17 | 25 |
| Plays–yards | 65–262 | 69–410 |
| Rushes–yards | 34–156 | 32–166 |
| Passing yards | 106 | 244 |
| Passing: comp–att–int | 19–31–0 | 21–37–1 |
| Turnovers | | |
| Time of possession | 33:04 | 26:56 |

| Team | Category | Player | Statistics |
|---|---|---|---|
| WKU | Passing | Tyrrell Pigrome | 19–30–0, 106 yards, 1 TD |
| WKU | Rushing | Gaej Walker | 17 rushes, 75 yards |
| WKU | Receiving | Xavier Lane | 3 receptions, 31 yards |
| BYU | Passing | Zach Wilson | 18–32–1, 224 yards, 3 TD's |
| BYU | Rushing | Tyler Allgeier | 16 rushes, 95 yards, 1 TD |
| BYU | Receiving | Dax Milne | 5 receptions, 67 yards, 1 TD |

=== Boise State ===
BYU at Boise State

| Team | 1 | 2 | 3 | 4 | Total |
|---|---|---|---|---|---|
| • #9/9 Cougars | 7 | 9 | 22 | 13 | 51 |
| #21/23 Broncos | 3 | 0 | 0 | 14 | 17 |

- Date: November 6
- Location: Albertsons Stadium
  Boise, Idaho
- Game start: 8:00 p.m. MST
- Elapsed time: 3:21
- Game attendance: 1,100
- Game weather: 64 °F (18 °C), Winds 10–15 mph; Clear
- Referee: David Alvarez • Umpire: Stuart Schake • Linesman: Rick Smith • Line judge: Mark Estermyer • Back judge: Terrance Jones • Field judge: Jason Ledet • Side judge: Corey Luxner • Center judge: Kenneth Ray
- TV announcers (FS1): Aaron Goldsmith and Petros Papadakis

Uniform combination: white helmets, white jersey, white pants w/ royal blue accents

Scoring summary

| Quarter | Time | Drive | | | Team | Scoring information | Score | |
| Quarter | Time | Plays | Yards | TOP | Team | Scoring information | BYU | BSU |
|---|---|---|---|---|---|---|---|---|
| 1 | 11:41 | 2 | 95 | 0:26 | BYU | Tyler Allgeier 86-yard touchdown run, Jake Oldroyd kick good | 7 | 0 |
| 1 | 3:27 | 16 | 53 | 7:57 | BSU | 39-yard field goal by Jonah Dalmas | 7 | 3 |
| 2 | 14:54 | 11 | 52 | 3:28 | BYU | 47-yard field goal by Jake Oldroyd | 10 | 3 |
| 2 | 1:00 | 8 | 96 | 1:26 | BYU | Zach Wilson 4-yard touchdown run, Jake Oldroyd kick blocked | 16 | 3 |
| 3 | 12:48 | 5 | 86 | 2:11 | BYU | Isaac Rex 5-yard touchdown reception from Zach Wilson, Jake Oldroyd kick good | 23 | 3 |
| 3 | 6:57 | 6 | 72 | 2:21 | BYU | Isaac Rex 20-yard touchdown reception from Zach Wilson, 2-point Zach Wilson pass to Neil Pau'u good | 31 | 3 |
| 3 | 1:26 | 7 | 72 | 2:36 | BYU | Lopini Katoa 20-yard touchdown run, Jake Oldroyd kick good | 38 | 3 |
| 4 | 11:27 | 6 | 30 | 3:01 | BYU | Neil Pau'u 1-yard touchdown run, Jake Oldroyd kick good | 45 | 3 |
| 4 | 9:17 | 6 | 80 | 2:09 | BSU | Khalil Shakir 52-yard touchdown reception from Cade Fennegan, Jonah Dalmas kick good | 45 | 10 |
| 4 | 9:07 | 1 | 46 | 0:07 | BSU | Khalil Shakir 46-yard touchdown reception from Cade Fennegan, Jonah Dalmas kick good | 45 | 17 |
| 4 | 7:59 | 3 | 45 | 1:06 | BYU | Tyler Allgeier 2-yard touchdown run, Jake Oldroyd kick missed wide left | 51 | 17 |
| "TOP" = time of possession. For other American football terms, see Glossary of American football. | | | | | | | 51 | 17 |

| Statistics | BYU | BSU |
|---|---|---|
| First downs | 25 | 14 |
| Plays–yards | 65–573 | 65–310 |
| Rushes–yards | 38–214 | 27–61 |
| Passing yards | 359 | 249 |
| Passing: comp–att–int | 21–27–0 | 23–38–1 |
| Turnovers | | |
| Time of possession | 26:47 | 33:13 |

| Team | Category | Player | Statistics |
|---|---|---|---|
| BYU | Passing | Zach Wilson | 21–27–0, 359 yards, 2 TD's |
| BYU | Rushing | Tyler Allgeier | 14 rushes, 123 yards, 2 TD's |
| BYU | Receiving | Gunner Romney | 6 receptions, 133 yards |
| BSU | Passing | Cade Fennegan | 15–26–1, 182 yards, 2 TD's |
| BSU | Rushing | Andrew Van Buren | 16 rushes, 45 yards |
| BSU | Receiving | Khalil Shakir | 10 receptions, 135 yards, 2 TD's |

=== North Alabama ===
North Alabama at BYU

| Team | 1 | 2 | 3 | 4 | Total |
|---|---|---|---|---|---|
| Lions | 0 | 7 | 0 | 7 | 14 |
| • #8/8 Cougars | 14 | 28 | 14 | 10 | 66 |

- Date: November 21
- Location: LaVell Edwards Stadium
  Provo, Utah
- Game start: 1:07 p.m. MST
- Elapsed time: 2:59
- Game attendance: 936
- Game weather: 45 °F (7 °C), Winds S 3 mph; Sunny
- Referee: Tuta Salaam • Umpire: Bill Bishop • Linesman: Mike Moeller • Line judge: Kelly Deterding • Back judge: Chris Alston • Field judge: Robert Asel • Side judge: Lo van Pham • Center judge: Dan Scanla
- TV announcers (BYUtv): Dave McCann, Blaine Fowler, and Jarom Jordan (BYUtv/ESPN3)
  Spencer Linton, David Nixon, and Mitch Mathews (byutv.org)

Uniform combination: white helmet (gray facemasks), navy jersey, white pants

Scoring summary

| Quarter | Time | Drive | | | Team | Scoring information | Score | |
| Quarter | Time | Plays | Yards | TOP | Team | Scoring information | UNA | BYU |
|---|---|---|---|---|---|---|---|---|
| 1 | 9:42 | 6 | 80 | 2:26 | BYU | Isaac Rex 2-yard touchdown reception from Zach Wilson, Jake Oldroyd kick good | 0 | 7 |
| 1 | 4:32 | 8 | 91 | 2:59 | BYU | Tyler Allgeier 2-yard touchdown run, Jake Oldroyd kick good | 0 | 14 |
| 2 | 13:24 | 11 | 86 | 3:12 | BYU | Tyler Allgeier 2-yard touchdown run, Jake Oldroyd kick good | 0 | 21 |
| 2 | 6:39 | 3 | 62 | 1:11 | BYU | Neil Pau'u 19-yard touchdown reception from Zach Wilson, Justen Smith kick good | 0 | 28 |
| 2 | 2:59 | 4 | 6 | 1:51 | BYU | Isaac Rex 3-yard touchdown reception from Zach Wilson, Jake Oldroyd kick good | 0 | 35 |
| 2 | 1:37 | 6 | 75 | 1:22 | UNA | Ja'Won Howell 2-yard touchdown run, Grayson Easterling kick good | 7 | 35 |
| 2 | 0:40 | 3 | 75 | 0:57 | BYU | Kavika Fonua 22-yard touchdown reception from Zach Wilson, Jake Oldroyd kick good | 7 | 42 |
| 3 | 10:50 | 5 | 39 | 2:36 | BYU | Kavika Fonua 7-yard touchdown reception from Baylor Romney, Jake Oldroyd kick good | 7 | 49 |
| 3 | 0:01 | 6 | 55 | 3:33 | BYU | Miles Davis 6-yard touchdown run, Jake Oldroyd kick good | 7 | 56 |
| 4 | 12:09 | 6 | 69 | 2:51 | UNA | Jakobi Byrd 29-yard touchdown reception from Rett Files, Grayson Easterling kick good | 14 | 56 |
| 4 | 3:36 | 8 | 36 | 4:01 | BYU | 53-yard field goal by Jake Oldroyd | 14 | 59 |
| 4 | 2:36 | 1 | 26 | 0:07 | BYU | Miles Davis 26-yard touchdown run, Jake Oldroyd kick good | 14 | 66 |
| "TOP" = time of possession. For other American football terms, see Glossary of American football. | | | | | | | 14 | 66 |

| Statistics | UNA | BYU |
|---|---|---|
| First downs | 21 | 25 |
| Plays–yards | 68–354 | 59–555 |
| Rushes–yards | 28–49 | 33–278 |
| Passing yards | 305 | 277 |
| Passing: comp–att–int | 26–40–1 | 18–26–0 |
| Turnovers | | |
| Time of possession | 33:23 | 26:37 |

| Team | Category | Player | Statistics |
|---|---|---|---|
| UNA | Passing | Rett Files | 15–21–1, 198 yards, 1 TD |
| UNA | Rushing | Tyler Prince | 5 rushes, 24 yards |
| UNA | Receiving | Dexter Boykin | 3 receptions, 64 yards |
| BYU | Passing | Zach Wilson | 10–16–0, 212 yards, 4 TD's |
| BYU | Rushing | Tyler Allgeier | 13 rushes, 141 yards, 2 TD's |
| BYU | Receiving | Dax Milne | 4 receptions, 101 yards |

=== Coastal Carolina ===
BYU at Coastal Carolina

| Team | 1 | 2 | 3 | 4 | Total |
|---|---|---|---|---|---|
| #8/8/13 Cougars | 0 | 14 | 3 | 0 | 17 |
| • #14/14/18 Chanticleers | 6 | 7 | 3 | 6 | 22 |

- Date: December 5
- Location: Brooks Stadium
  Conway, South Carolina
- Game start: 5:37 p.m. EST
- Elapsed time: 3:20
- Game attendance: 5,000
- Game weather: 52 °F (11 °C), No wind; Clear
- Referee: Kyle Olson • Umpire: Mark Baynes • Linesman: Kevin Vicknair • Line judge: Dion Quinn • Back judge: Larry Whaley • Field judge: Grant Jackson • Side judge: Barry Blackwell • Center judge: Andy Faust
- TV announcers (ESPNU): Bill Roth, Dustin Fox, and Ryan McGee

Uniform combination: white helmets (grey facemasks), white jersey, white pants w/ royal blue accents

Scoring summary

| Quarter | Time | Drive | | | Team | Scoring information | Score | |
| Quarter | Time | Plays | Yards | TOP | Team | Scoring information | BYU | CCU |
|---|---|---|---|---|---|---|---|---|
| 1 | 0:10 | 17 | 94 | 9:05 | CCU | C. J. Marable 6-yard touchdown run, Massimo Biscardi kick missed wide left | 0 | 6 |
| 2 | 13:50 | 4 | 76 | 1:15 | BYU | Tyler Allgeier 42-yard touchdown run, Jake Oldroyd kick good | 7 | 6 |
| 2 | 4:00 | 11 | 51 | 5:54 | CCU | Reese White 1-yard touchdown run, Massimo Biscardi kick good | 7 | 13 |
| 2 | 1:45 | 6 | 94 | 2:07 | BYU | Dax Milne 41-yard touchdown reception from Zach Wilson, Jake Oldroyd kick good | 14 | 13 |
| 3 | 12:28 | 7 | 56 | 2:27 | BYU | 29-yard field goal by Jake Oldroyd | 17 | 13 |
| 3 | 6:32 | 4 | 7 | 2:07 | CCU | 41-yard field goal by Massimo Biscardi | 17 | 16 |
| 4 | 11:35 | 13 | 85 | 6:06 | CCU | C. J. Marable 2-yard touchdown run, 2-point Reese White rush failed | 17 | 22 |
| "TOP" = time of possession. For other American football terms, see Glossary of American football. | | | | | | | 17 | 22 |

| Statistics | BYU | CCU |
|---|---|---|
| First downs | 21 | 22 |
| Plays–yards | 58–405 | 69–366 |
| Rushes–yards | 26–165 | 54–281 |
| Passing yards | 240 | 85 |
| Passing: comp–att–int | 19–32–1 | 10–15–0 |
| Turnovers | | |
| Time of possession | 22:09 | 37:51 |

| Team | Category | Player | Statistics |
|---|---|---|---|
| BYU | Passing | Zach Wilson | 19–32–1, 240 yards, 1 TD |
| BYU | Rushing | Tyler Allgeier | 13 rushes, 106 yards, 1 TD |
| BYU | Receiving | Dax Milne | 6 receptions, 106 yards, 1 TD |
| CCU | Passing | Grayson McCall | 10–15–0, 85 yards |
| CCU | Rushing | C. J. Marable | 23 rushes, 132 yards, 2 TD's |
| CCU | Receiving | Kameron Brown | 4 receptions, 47 yards |

=== San Diego State ===
San Diego State at BYU

| Team | 1 | 2 | 3 | 4 | Total |
|---|---|---|---|---|---|
| Aztecs | 14 | 0 | 0 | 0 | 14 |
| • #14/16/18 Cougars | 7 | 10 | 3 | 8 | 28 |

- Date: December 12
- Location: LaVell Edwards Stadium
  Provo, Utah
- Game start: 8:05 p.m. MST
- Elapsed time: 3:06
- Game attendance: 0
- Game weather: 25 °F (−4 °C), Winds N 5 mph; Snowing
- Referee: Tim Davis • Umpire: Rico Orsot • Linesman: Eric Carmouche • Line judge: Jake Weatherford • Back judge: Robert Lewis • Field judge: Brian Wirfel • Side judge: Keith Clairborne • Center judge: Bret Bascue
- TV announcers (ESPN2): Beth Mowins, Kirk Morrison, and Stormy Buonantony

Uniform combination: black helmets, black jersey w/ white numbers and royal blue stripes, black pants w/ royal blue accents

Scoring summary

| Quarter | Time | Drive | | | Team | Scoring information | Score | |
| Quarter | Time | Plays | Yards | TOP | Team | Scoring information | SDSU | BYU |
|---|---|---|---|---|---|---|---|---|
| 1 | 10:56 | 9 | 75 | 4:04 | BYU | Dax Milne 5-yard touchdown reception from Zach Wilson, Jake Oldroyd kick good | 0 | 7 |
| 1 | 5:56 | 9 | 77 | 4:54 | SDSU | Kaegun Williams 25-yard touchdown run, Matt Araiza kick good | 7 | 7 |
| 2 | 3:08 | 6 | 33 | 2:42 | SDSU | Elijah Kothe 15-yard touchdown reception from Jordon Brookshire, Matt Araiza kick good | 14 | 7 |
| 2 | 8:34 | 5 | 54 | 2:34 | BYU | Isaac Rex 2-yard touchdown reception from Zach Wilson, Jake Oldroyd kick good | 14 | 14 |
| 2 | 0:00 | 5 | 35 | 1:01 | BYU | 50-yard field goal by Jake Oldroyd | 14 | 17 |
| 3 | 5:47 | 13 | 80 | 6:48 | BYU | 29-yard field goal by Jake Oldroyd | 14 | 20 |
| 4 | 10:53 | 7 | 72 | 3:12 | BYU | Isaac Rex 20-yard touchdown reception from Zach Wilson, 2-point Wilson pass to Lopini Katoa good | 14 | 28 |
| "TOP" = time of possession. For other American football terms, see Glossary of American football. | | | | | | | 14 | 28 |

| Statistics | SDSU | BYU |
|---|---|---|
| First downs | 23 | 16 |
| Plays–yards | 77–399 | 53–384 |
| Rushes–yards | 46–169 | 19–74 |
| Passing yards | 230 | 310 |
| Passing: comp–att–int | 21–31–1 | 25–34–0 |
| Turnovers | | |
| Time of possession | 37:00 | 23:00 |

| Team | Category | Player | Statistics |
|---|---|---|---|
| SDSU | Passing | Jordon Brookshire | 21–31–1, 230 yards, 1 TD |
| SDSU | Rushing | Kaegun Williams | 16 rushes, 92 yards, 1 TD |
| SDSU | Receiving | Greg Bell | 2 receptions, 42 yards |
| BYU | Passing | Zach Wilson | 25–34–0, 310 yards, 3 TD's |
| BYU | Rushing | Lopini Katoa | 13 rushes, 83 yards |
| BYU | Receiving | Neil Pau'u | 8 receptions, 117 yards |

=== Boca Raton Bowl: UCF ===
UCF vs. BYU

| Team | 1 | 2 | 3 | 4 | Total |
|---|---|---|---|---|---|
| Knights | 0 | 10 | 7 | 6 | 23 |
| • #13/15/16 Cougars | 21 | 14 | 14 | 0 | 49 |

- Date: December 22
- Location: FAU Stadium
  Boca Raton, Florida
- Game start: 7:05 p.m. EST
- Elapsed time: 3:25
- Game attendance: 6,000
- Referee: Tim O'Dey • Umpire: Tim Gover • Linesman: B.J. Henry • Line judge: Dorsey Skinner • Back judge: Bob Stinson • Field judge: Monte Tilgner • Side judge: Ryan Gannon • Center judge: Dan Novak
- TV announcers (ESPN): Dave LaMont, DJ Shockley, and Lericia Harris (ESPN)
  Chris Carlin and Craig Haubert (ESPN Radio)

Uniform combination: white helmets, white jersey w/ royal blue numbers and royal blue stripes, white pants w/ royal blue accents

Scoring summary

| Quarter | Time | Drive | | | Team | Scoring information | Score | |
| Quarter | Time | Plays | Yards | TOP | Team | Scoring information | UCF | BYU |
|---|---|---|---|---|---|---|---|---|
| 1 | 13:11 | 5 | 87 | 1:49 | BYU | Zach Wilson 15-yard touchdown run, Jake Oldroyd kick good | 0 | 7 |
| 1 | 11:10 | 4 | 72 | 1:13 | BYU | Isaac Rex 36-yard touchdown reception from Zach Wilson, Jake Oldroyd kick good | 0 | 14 |
| 1 | 0:25 | 4 | 76 | 1:42 | BYU | Zach Wilson 4-yard touchdown run, Jake Oldroyd kick good | 0 | 21 |
| 2 | 10:11 | 15 | 80 | 5:14 | UCF | Greg McCrae 5-yard touchdown run, Daniel Obarski kick good | 7 | 21 |
| 2 | 7:11 | 7 | 68 | 3:00 | BYU | Isaac Rex 27-yard touchdown reception from Zach Wilson, Jake Oldroyd kick good | 7 | 28 |
| 2 | 3:31 | 6 | 87 | 2:54 | BYU | Neil Pau'u 35-yard touchdown reception from Zach Wilson, Jake Oldroyd kick good | 7 | 35 |
| 2 | 0:19 | 12 | 57 | 3:12 | UCF | 35-yard field goal by Daniel Obarski | 10 | 35 |
| 3 | 13:11 | 2 | 50 | 0:45 | BYU | Tyler Allgeier 39-yard touchdown run, Jake Oldroyd kick good | 10 | 42 |
| 3 | 9:31 | 8 | 67 | 3:11 | BYU | Gunner Romney 6-yard touchdown run, Jake Oldroyd kick good | 10 | 49 |
| 3 | 0:05 | 8 | 68 | 2:58 | UCF | Jacob Harris 21-yard touchdown reception from Dillon Gabriel, Daniel Obarski kick good | 17 | 49 |
| 4 | 7:53 | 14 | 82 | 5:09 | UCF | Jaylon Robinson 9-yard touchdown reception from Dillon Gabriel, 2-point Dillon Gabriel pass failed | 23 | 49 |
| "TOP" = time of possession. For other American football terms, see Glossary of American football. | | | | | | | 23 | 49 |

| Statistics | UCF | BYU |
|---|---|---|
| First downs | 28 | 34 |
| Plays–yards | 88–411 | 73–655 |
| Rushes–yards | 43–194 | 38–214 |
| Passing yards | 217 | 441 |
| Passing: comp–att–int | 21–45–0 | 27–35–0 |
| Turnovers | | |
| Time of possession | 26:38 | 33:22 |

| Team | Category | Player | Statistics |
|---|---|---|---|
| UCF | Passing | Dillon Gabriel | 21–45–0, 217 yards, 2 TD's |
| UCF | Rushing | Greg McCrae | 18 rushes, 77 yards, 1 TD |
| UCF | Receiving | Jacob Harris | 4 receptions, 67 yards, 1 TD |
| BYU | Passing | Zach Wilson | 26–34–0, 425 yards, 3 TD's |
| BYU | Rushing | Tyler Allgeier | 19 rushes, 193 yards, 1 TD |
| BYU | Receiving | Isaac Rex | 5 receptions, 96 yards, 2 TD's |

== Players drafted into the NFL ==
| Round | Pick | Player | Position | NFL Club |
|---|---|---|---|---|
| 1 | 2 | Zach Wilson | QB | New York Jets |
| 3 | 70 | Brady Christensen | OT | Carolina Panthers |
| 7 | 250 | Khyiris Tonga | DT | Chicago Bears |
| 7 | 251 | Chris Wilcox | CB | Tampa Bay Buccaneers |
| 7 | 258 | Dax Milne | WR | Washington Football Team |
