= Dax Milne =

American football player (born 1999)

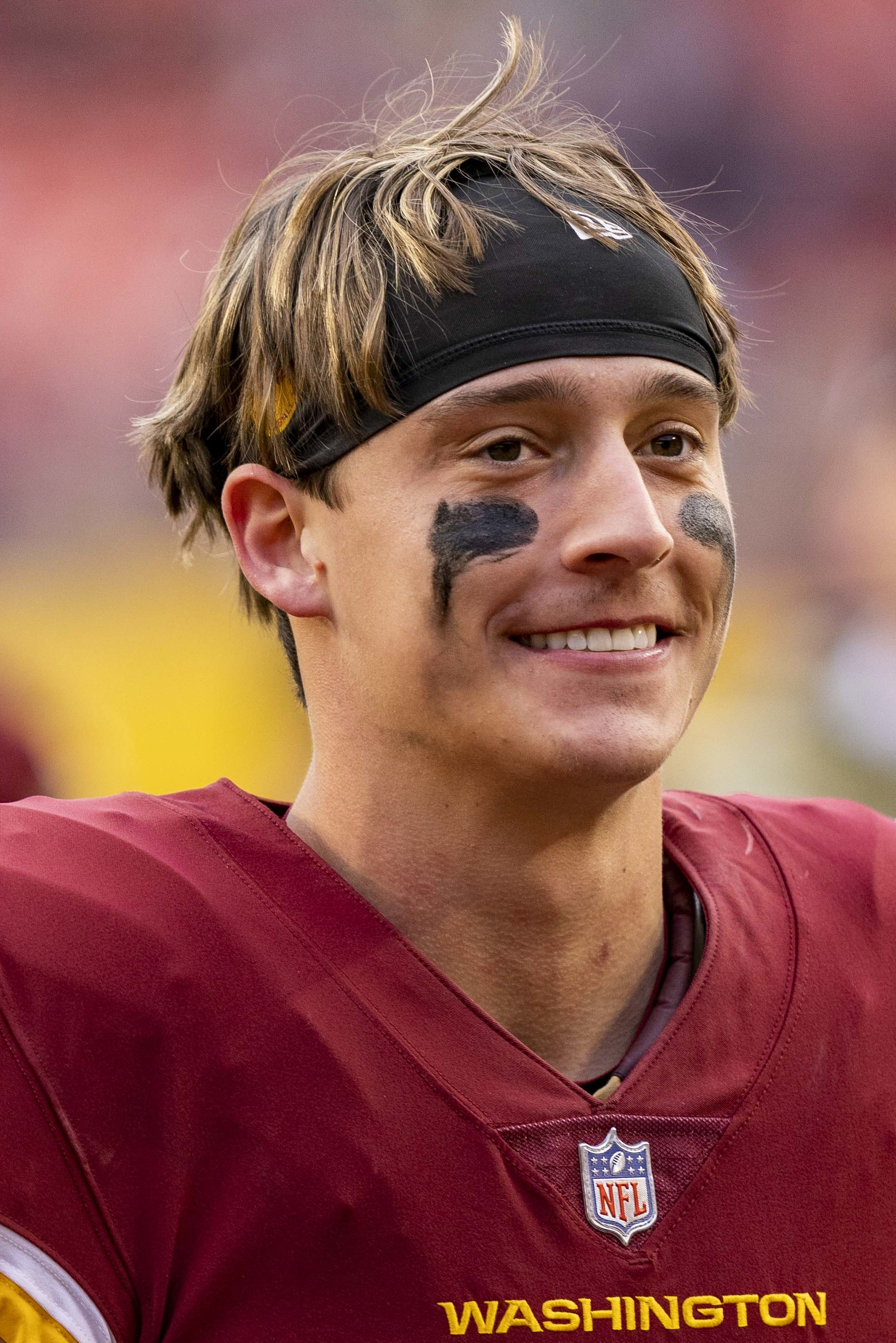
- Milne with the Washington Football Team in 2021

No. 89, 15
- Position: Wide receiver

Personal information
- Born: June 23, 1999 (age 27); South Jordan, Utah, U.S.
- Listed height: 6 ft 1 in (1.85 m)
- Listed weight: 200 lb (91 kg)

Career information
- High school: Bingham (South Jordan)
- College: BYU (2018–2020)
- NFL draft: 2021: 7th round, 258th overall pick

Career history
- Washington Football Team / Commanders (2021–2023); Las Vegas Raiders (2024)*; Carolina Panthers (2024)*
- * Offseason or practice squad member only

Career NFL statistics
- Receptions: 15
- Receiving yards: 120
- Receiving touchdowns: 1
- Return yards: 611
- Stats at Pro Football Reference

Dax Milne (born June 23, 1999) is an American former professional football player who was a wide receiver in the National Football League (NFL). He played college football for the BYU Cougars and was selected by the Washington Football Team in the seventh round of the 2021 NFL draft.

== Early life ==
Milne grew up in South Jordan, Utah and attended Bingham High School, where he played basketball and football. He was a member of three state championship teams in football and two in basketball. As a senior Milne was named second-team 6A All-State by the Salt Lake Tribune after catching 23 passes for 408 yards and eight touchdowns. Milne opted to play college football at BYU as a preferred walk-on over scholarship offers from Southern Utah and Weber State.

== College career ==
Milne played in 10 games with three starts in his freshman season and finished the year with 69 yards and one touchdown on 10 receptions. Milne was awarded a scholarship three weeks into his freshman year. He caught 21 passes for 285 yards and two touchdowns as a sophomore. Milne finished his junior season with 70 catches for 1,188 yards and eight touchdowns and was a finalist for the Burlsworth Trophy. Following the end of the season, Milne declared that he would forgo his senior season to enter the NFL draft.

== Professional career ==
Pre-draft measurables
Height	Weight	Arm length	Hand span	40-yard dash	10-yard split	20-yard split	20-yard shuttle	Three-cone drill	Vertical jump	Broad jump	Bench press
6 ft 0 5/8 in (1.84 m)	193 lb (88 kg)	29 3/8 in (0.75 m)	9 3/8 in (0.24 m)	4.56 s	1.57 s	2.70 s	4.22 s	6.85 s	31.0 in (0.79 m)	9 ft 6 in (2.90 m)	14 reps

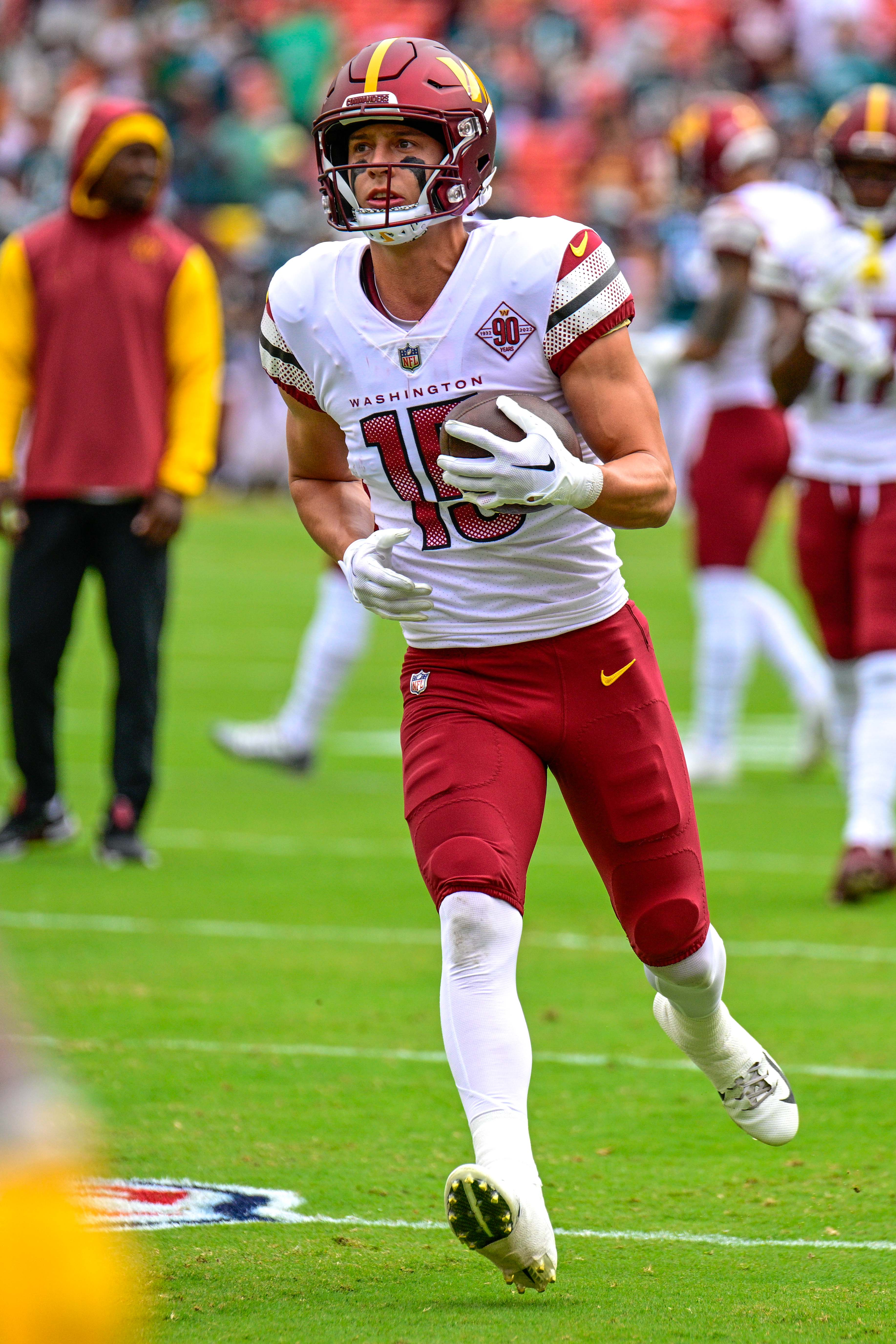
Milne with Washington in 2022

=== Washington Football Team / Commanders ===
Milne was selected by the Washington Football Team in the seventh round (258th overall) of the 2021 NFL draft. He signed his four-year rookie contract on May 13, 2021. Milne scored his first career touchdown in 2022. On September 8, 2023, Milne was placed on injured reserve with a groin injury. He was released by the team on July 31, 2024.

=== Las Vegas Raiders ===
Milne signed with the Las Vegas Raiders on August 6, 2024. He was waived by the Raiders on August 27.

=== Carolina Panthers ===
On October 30, 2024, Milne was signed to the Carolina Panthers' practice squad. He was released by the Panthers on December 10. On December 18, the Panthers re–signed Milne to their practice squad. He signed a reserve/future contract with Carolina on January 6, 2025. On May 8, Milne was released by the Panthers.

Later in 2025, Milne worked out for the Denver Broncos. On April 6, 2026, Milne announced his retirement from professional football.

== Personal life ==
Milne's father, Darren, played college baseball at BYU and later Minor League Baseball in the Detroit Tigers organization.

Milne has been friends with New Orleans Saints quarterback and former BYU Cougars teammate Zach Wilson since childhood.
