= Chris Wilcox (American football) =

American football player (born 1997)

Profile
- Position: Cornerback

Personal information
- Born: October 30, 1997 (age 29); Fontana, California, U.S.
- Listed height: 6 ft 2 in (1.88 m)
- Listed weight: 195 lb (88 kg)

Career information
- High school: Eleanor Roosevelt (Eastvale, California)
- College: BYU (2016–2020)
- NFL draft: 2021: 7th round, 251st overall pick

Career history
- Tampa Bay Buccaneers (2021)*; Indianapolis Colts (2021–2022); Arizona Cardinals (2022)*; Pittsburgh Steelers (2023)*; Los Angeles Chargers (2023–2024)*; Carolina Panthers (2024)*
- * Offseason or practice squad member only
- Stats at Pro Football Reference

Chris Wilcox (born October 30, 1997) is an American professional football cornerback. He played college football at BYU and was drafted by the Tampa Bay Buccaneers in the seventh round, 251st overall, in the 2021 NFL draft.

== Professional career ==
=== Tampa Bay Buccaneers ===
Wilcox was drafted by the Tampa Bay Buccaneers in the seventh round (251st overall) of the 2021 NFL draft. He signed his four-year rookie contract on May 13, 2021. He was waived on August 31, 2021.

=== Indianapolis Colts ===
On September 1, 2021, Wilcox was claimed off waivers by the Indianapolis Colts. He was waived on September 14, 2021, and re-signed to the practice squad. He signed a reserve/future contract on January 10, 2022.

On August 30, 2022, Wilcox was waived by the Colts and signed to the practice squad the next day. He was released on September 13.

=== Arizona Cardinals ===
On December 28, 2022, Wilcox signed with the practice squad of the Arizona Cardinals.

=== Pittsburgh Steelers ===
On January 11, 2023, Wilcox signed a reserve/future contract with the Pittsburgh Steelers. He was waived on August 29, 2023.

=== Los Angeles Chargers ===
On September 1, 2023, Wilcox was signed to the Los Angeles Chargers practice squad. He signed a reserve/future contract on January 11, 2024.

Wilcox was waived by the Chargers on August 13, 2024.

=== Carolina Panthers ===
On August 22, 2024, Wilcox signed with the Carolina Panthers. He was waived on August 27.
