= Brady Christensen =

American football player (born 1996)

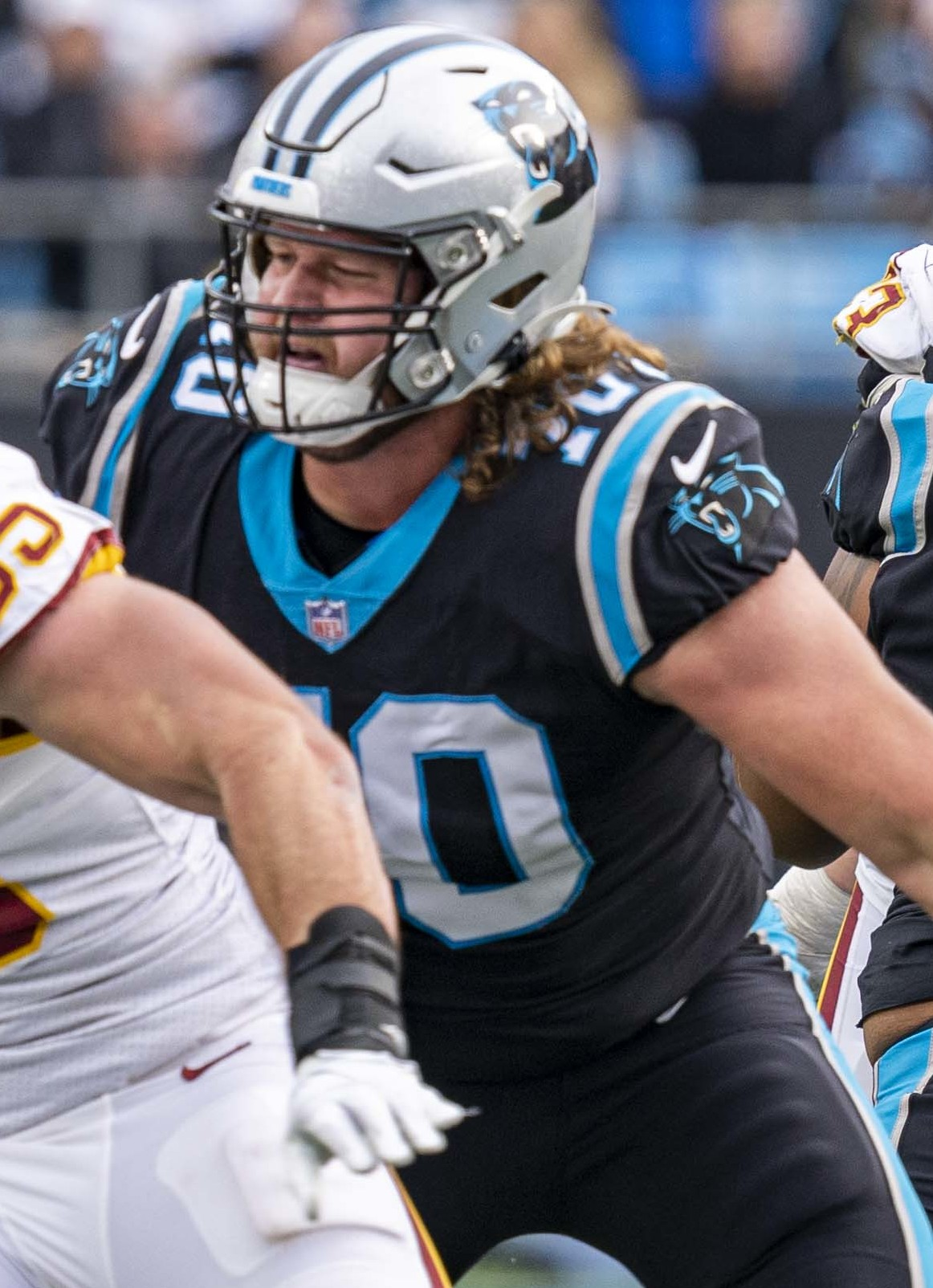
- Christensen with the Carolina Panthers in 2021

No. 70 – Carolina Panthers
- Position: Offensive guard
- Roster status: Injured reserve

Personal information
- Born: September 27, 1996 (age 30); Bountiful, Utah, U.S.
- Listed height: 6 ft 6 in (1.98 m)
- Listed weight: 300 lb (136 kg)

Career information
- High school: Bountiful
- College: BYU (2017–2020)
- NFL draft: 2021: 3rd round, 70th overall pick

Career history
- Carolina Panthers (2021–present)

Awards and highlights
- Consensus All-American (2020)

Career NFL statistics as of 2025
- Games played: 59
- Games started: 34
- Stats at Pro Football Reference

Brady Christensen (born September 27, 1996) is an American professional football offensive guard for the Carolina Panthers of the National Football League (NFL). He played college football for the BYU Cougars and was selected by the Carolina Panthers in the third round of the 2021 NFL draft.

== Early life ==
Christensen grew up in Bountiful, Utah, and attended Bountiful High School. Christensen was rated a two-star recruit and originally committed to play college football at the US Air Force Academy before changing his commitment to BYU. After graduating from Bountiful and prior to attending BYU, he served a 2-year mission for the Church of Jesus Christ of Latter-day Saints in Hamilton, New Zealand, from 2015 to 2016.

== College career ==
Christensen redshirted his true freshman season at BYU after returning from his mission. He became the Cougars' starting left tackle going into his redshirt freshman season and started every game for them over the next two seasons. As a redshirt junior, he was named a consensus first-team All-American. Following the end of the season, he announced that he would forgo his remaining collegiate eligibility to enter the 2021 NFL draft.

== Professional career ==
Pre-draft measurables
Height	Weight	Arm length	Hand span	Wingspan	40-yard dash	10-yard split	20-yard split	20-yard shuttle	Three-cone drill	Vertical jump	Broad jump	Bench press
6 ft 5 1/4 in (1.96 m)	302 lb (137 kg)	32 1/4 in (0.82 m)	10 1/4 in (0.26 m)	6 ft 8 in (2.03 m)	4.89 s	1.71 s	2.85 s	4.52 s	7.33 s	34.0 in (0.86 m)	10 ft 4 in (3.15 m)	30 reps
All values from Pro Day

Christensen was selected by the Carolina Panthers in the third round (70th overall) of the 2021 NFL draft. He signed his four-year rookie contract with Carolina on June 24, 2021, worth $5.16 million. He was named a backup tackle as a rookie, but started six games due to injuries.

In 2022, Christensen was named the Panthers starting left guard, starting all 17 games. In the season finale against the New Orleans Saints, he suffered a broken left ankle.

Christensen returned to his starting role in 2023, but suffered a biceps injury in Week 1 and was placed on injured reserve on September 13, 2023.

On March 12, 2025, Christensen re-signed with the Panthers on a one-year, $2.8 million contract. He made eight appearances (four starts) for Carolina during the regular season. In Week 8 against the Buffalo Bills, Christensen suffered a torn Achilles tendon, causing him to be placed on season-ending injured reserve.

On July 17, 2026, Christensen re-signed with the Panthers on a one-year contract. He was placed on injured reserve due to a hamstring injury on August 31.
