= Max Tooley =

American football player (born 1998)

Profile
- Position: Linebacker

Personal information
- Born: March 5, 1998 (age 28); Bountiful, Utah, U.S.
- Listed height: 6 ft 2 in (1.88 m)
- Listed weight: 225 lb (102 kg)

Career information
- High school: Bountiful
- College: BYU (2018–2023)
- NFL draft: 2024: undrafted

Career history
- Houston Texans (2024)*; Minnesota Vikings (2024)*
- * Offseason or practice squad member only
- Stats at Pro Football Reference

Maxwell Tooley (born March 5, 1998) is an American professional football linebacker. He played college football for the BYU Cougars.

== Early life ==
Tooley attended high school at Bountiful in Utah. Coming out of high school, Tooley was rated as a three star recruit where he decided to commit to play college football for the BYU Cougars.

== College career ==
In Tooley's first two seasons with BYU in 2018 and 2019, he played in 17 totaled games, where he recorded 50 tackles with two being for a loss, and an interception. During the COVID shorted 2020 season, Tooley notched 44 tackles with three going for a loss, a pass deflection, and an interception. In 2021, Tooley would finish the season posting 68 tackles with five and a half being for a loss, a sack, three pass deflections, and an interception. In week one of the 2022 season, Tooley recorded five tackles and an interception which he returned for his first career touchdown in a 50-21 win over South Florida. In week six, Tooley tallied 13 tackles as well as an interception for the Cougars versus Notre Dame. Tooley finished the 2022 season notching 57 tackles, a forced fumble, three interceptions, and two touchdowns. During Tooley's final collegiate season he totaled 92 tackles with five being for a loss, a sack, an interception, and a forced fumble.

== Professional career ==
Pre-draft measurables
Height	Weight	Arm length	Hand span	40-yard dash	10-yard split	20-yard split	20-yard shuttle	Three-cone drill	Vertical jump	Broad jump
6 ft 2 1/8 in (1.88 m)	229 lb (104 kg)	32 1/4 in (0.82 m)	9 1/4 in (0.23 m)	4.58 s	1.71 s	2.64 s	4.54 s	7.34 s	34.5 in (0.88 m)	10 ft 2 in (3.10 m)
All values from Pro Day

=== Houston Texans ===
After not being selected in the 2024 NFL draft, Tooley decided to sign with the Houston Texans as an undrafted free agent. He was waived on August 27, and re-signed to the practice squad. He was released on September 17.

=== Minnesota Vikings ===
On September 19, 2024, Tooley was signed to the practice squad of the Minnesota Vikings. He signed a reserve/future contract with Minnesota on January 16, 2025.

On July 30, 2025, Tooley was waived by the Vikings. Tooley was signed by the Vikings again on August 13, but was waived again on August 19.

== Personal life ==
Tooley is a member of the Church of Jesus Christ of Latter-day Saints and served a mission for the church in London, England, United Kingdom.
