= Khyiris Tonga =

American football player (born 1996)

No. 92 – Kansas City Chiefs
- Position: Nose tackle
- Roster status: Active

Personal information
- Born: July 7, 1996 (age 30); West Valley City, Utah, U.S.
- Listed height: 6 ft 2 in (1.88 m)
- Listed weight: 335 lb (152 kg)

Career information
- High school: Granger (West Valley City, Utah)
- College: BYU (2017–2020)
- NFL draft: 2021: 7th round, 250th overall pick

Career history
- Chicago Bears (2021); Atlanta Falcons (2022)*; Minnesota Vikings (2022–2023); Arizona Cardinals (2024); New England Patriots (2025); Kansas City Chiefs (2026–present)
- * Offseason or practice squad member only

Career NFL statistics as of 2025
- Total tackles: 113
- Sacks: 0.5
- Fumble recoveries: 1
- Pass deflections: 6
- Stats at Pro Football Reference

Khyiris Tonga (KYE-riss; born July 7, 1996) is an American professional football nose tackle for the Kansas City Chiefs of the National Football League (NFL). He played college football for the BYU Cougars and was selected by the Chicago Bears in the seventh round of the 2021 NFL draft.

== College career ==
Initially committed to Utah after high school, Tonga flipped to BYU after former Oregon State defensive coordinator Kalani Sitake was named the Cougars' head coach while Tonga was serving his two-year mission.

After a strong junior season where he made 45 tackles, Tonga was expected to be an NFL draft prospect, but announced he would return for his senior season.

== Professional career ==
=== Pre-draft ===
Pre-draft measurables
Height	Weight	Arm length	Hand span	Wingspan	40-yard dash	10-yard split	20-yard split	20-yard shuttle	Three-cone drill	Vertical jump	Broad jump	Bench press
6 ft 2 1/8 in (1.88 m)	325 lb (147 kg)	31 in (0.79 m)	9 5/8 in (0.24 m)	6 ft 7 in (2.01 m)	5.07 s	1.74 s	2.89 s	4.73 s	7.83 s	28.0 in (0.71 m)	8 ft 9 in (2.67 m)	35 reps
All values from Pro Day

Tonga was praised by draft analysts for his ability to eat up space as a nose tackle, but was expected to be a day three prospect due to his age, short arms, and below-average hand size.

=== Chicago Bears ===
Tonga was selected by the Chicago Bears in the seventh round, 250th overall, of the 2021 NFL draft. On June 2, 2021, Tonga signed his four-year rookie contract with Chicago. He was waived by the Bears on August 31, 2022.

=== Atlanta Falcons ===
On September 5, 2022, Tonga was signed to the practice squad of the Atlanta Falcons.

=== Minnesota Vikings ===
On October 5, 2022, Tonga was signed by the Minnesota Vikings off the Falcons practice squad.

=== Arizona Cardinals ===
On March 15, 2024, Tonga signed with the Arizona Cardinals. He played in 13 games with one start, recording 22 tackles.

=== New England Patriots ===
On March 14, 2025, Tonga signed a one-year, $2.7 million contract with the New England Patriots. He played in 14 games with eight starts, recording 24 tackles. He would also take offensive snaps as a fullback.

=== Kanasas City Chiefs ===
On March 12, 2026, Tonga signed a three-year, $21 million contract with the Kansas City Chiefs.

== NFL career statistics ==
Legend
**Bold**	Career high

=== Regular season ===
Year	Team	Games		Tackles						Interceptions						Fumbles	
Year	Team	GP	GS	Cmb	Solo	Ast	Sck	TFL	Sfty	PD	Int	Yds	Avg	Lng	TD	FF	FR
2021	CHI	**15**	2	24	10	14	0.0	1	0	0	0	0	0	0	0	0	**1**
2022	MIN	11	2	**28**	**12**	**16**	**0.5**	1	0	**4**	0	0	0	0	0	0	0
2023	MIN	14	2	15	9	6	0.0	1	0	0	0	0	0	0	0	0	0
2024	ARI	13	1	22	6	**16**	0.0	0	0	0	0	0	0	0	0	0	0
2025	NE	14	**8**	24	9	15	0.0	**2**	0	2	0	0	0	0	0	0	0
Career		67	15	113	46	67	0.5	5	0	6	0	0	0	0	0	0	1

=== Postseason ===
Year	Team	Games		Tackles						Interceptions						Fumbles	
Year	Team	GP	GS	Cmb	Solo	Ast	Sck	TFL	Sfty	PD	Int	Yds	Avg	Lng	TD	FF	FR
2022	MIN	1	0	1	0	1	0.0	0	0	0	0	0	0.0	0	0	0	0
2025	NE	3	0	**7**	**5**	**2**	**1.0**	**2**	0	0	0	0	0.0	0	0	0	0
Career		4	0	8	5	3	1.0	2	0	0	0	0	0.0	0	0	0	0

== Personal life ==
Before enrolling at BYU, Tonga served a two-year mission for the Church of Jesus Christ of Latter-day Saints in Wichita, Kansas.
