= 2021 BYU Cougars football team =

American college football season

2021 BYU Cougars football

Beehive Boot champion

Independence Bowl, L 28–31 vs. UAB
- Conference: Independent

Ranking
- Coaches: No. 22
- AP: No. 19
- Record: 10–3
- Head coach: Kalani Sitake (6th season)
- Offensive coordinator: Aaron Roderick (1st season)
- Offensive scheme: Power spread
- Defensive coordinator: Ilaisa Tuiaki (6th season)
- Base defense: 4–3
- Captains: Keenan Pili; Jaren Hall; Payton Wilgar; James Empey
- Home stadium: LaVell Edwards Stadium

2021 NCAA Division I FBS independents football records
| | Conf. | | | Overall |
| Team | W | | L | W | | L |
|---|---|---|---|---|---|---|
| No. 8 Notre Dame | | – | | 11 | – | 2 |
| No. 19 BYU | | – | | 10 | – | 3 |
| Army | | – | | 9 | – | 4 |
| Liberty | | – | | 8 | – | 5 |
| New Mexico State | | – | | 2 | – | 10 |
| UMass | | – | | 1 | – | 11 |
| UConn | | – | | 1 | – | 11 |
Rankings from AP Poll

The 2021 BYU Cougars football team represented Brigham Young University in the 2021 NCAA Division I FBS football season. The Cougars were led by sixth-year head coach Kalani Sitake and played their home games at LaVell Edwards Stadium. This was the eleventh year BYU competed as an NCAA Division I FBS independent. The Cougars finished with 10 wins for the second year in a row.

== Before the season ==
=== Departures to NFL ===
Quarterback Zach Wilson, offensive lineman Brady Christensen, and wide receiver Dax Milne all opted to forego their senior seasons and leave early for the NFL Draft.

Wilson became the highest draft pick in program history when he was selected second overall by the New York Jets. Christensen was selected in the third round by the Carolina Panthers, while Milne and two seniors, nose tackle Khyiris Tonga and defensive back Chris Wilcox, were each selected in the seventh round by the Washington Football Team, Chicago Bears, and Tampa Bay Buccaneers, respectively. Seven other players signed undrafted free agent contracts with NFL teams. The five players selected marked the most in program history since 2002.

=== Coaching changes ===
On January 4, 2021 it was announced that Jeff Grimes had accepted a job with Baylor University as the offensive coordinator. Offensive line coach Eric Mateos followed Grimes to Baylor. Aaron Roderick, previously serving as the passing game coordinator and quarterbacks coach under Grimes, was promoted to offensive coordinator for the Cougars. Wide receivers coach Fesi Sitake was then promoted to passing game coordinator. Both Roderick and Sitake will retain their roles as position coaches for the quarterbacks and wide receivers, respectively.

On February 4, 2021 it was announced that Kevin Clune had accepted a job as the linebackers coach for the Cougars. With the new hire Ed Lamb shifted to coach the safeties on the defensive side of the ball, Preston Hadley to the defensive ends/Hybrids and Ilaisa Tuiaki to interior defensive line.

On February 5, 2021 it was announced that Darrell Funk had accepted a job as the offensive line coach for the Cougars.

=== 2021 recruits ===
| Name | Pos. | Height | Weight | Hometown | Notes |
|---|---|---|---|---|---|
| Ricky Wolfgramm | DL | 6'2" | 258 | Salt Lake City, Utah | Mission prior to enrolling |
| Quenton Rice | DB | 6'1" | 190 | Las Vegas, Nevada | |
| Isaiah Glasker | DB | 6'5" | 205 | South Jordan, Utah | Mission prior to enrolling |
| Nathan Hoke | LB | 6'3" | 225 | Pittsburgh, Pennsylvania | Mission prior to enrolling |
| Kyson Hall | WR | 5'11" | 180 | Spanish Fork, Utah | Mission prior to enrolling |
| Jovesa Damuni | RB | 6'0" | 180 | Providence, Utah | Mission prior to enrolling |
| Raider Damuni | DB | 6'2" | 190 | Provo, Utah | Mission prior to enrolling |
| Dallin Havea | RB | 6'2" | 230 | Orem, Utah | Mission prior to enrolling |
| John Henry Daley | DL | 6'5" | 225 | Alpine, Utah | Mission prior to enrolling |
| Logan Fano | LB | 6'4" | 225 | Spanish Fork, Utah | Mission prior to enrolling |
| Sione Hingano | OL | 6'5" | 285 | Chandler, Arizona | Mission prior to enrolling |
| Bentley Redden | TE | 6'5" | 220 | San Clemente, California | Mission prior to enrolling |
| Weston Jones | OL | 6'5" | 255 | Washington, Michigan | Mission prior to enrolling |
| Dylan Rollins | OL | 6'6" | 285 | Missoula, Montana | |
| Joshua Singh | DL | 6'0" | 260 | Orem, Utah | |
| Cooper McMullin | DL | 6'6" | 305 | Carlsbad, California | |
| Maguire Anderson | WR | 6'0" | 185 | Lutz, Florida | |

=== 2020 returned missionaries ===
| Name | Pos. | Height | Weight | Year | Notes |
|---|---|---|---|---|---|
| Tysen Lewis | OL | 6'5" | 270 | Freshman | |
| Talen Alfrey | DB | 6'3" | 185 | Freshman | |
| Campbell Barrington | OL | 6'6" | 280 | Freshman | |
| Donovan Hanna | OL | 6'4" | 230 | Freshman | |
| Isaac Matua | LB | 6'3" | 205 | Freshman | |
| Ethan Erickson | TE | 6'5" | 225 | Freshman | |
| Brock Gunderson | OL | 6'4" | 265 | Freshman | |
| Dallin Holker | TE | 6'5" | 222 | Sophomore | |
| Chase Roberts | WR | 6'4" | 195 | Freshman | |
| Hunter Greer | DL | 6'5" | 235 | Freshman | |
| Jake Jensen | QB | 6'2" | 210 | Freshman | |
| Jaylon Vickers | DB | 5'10" | 183 | Freshman | |
| Nick Nethercott | DB | 6'3" | 183 | Freshman | |
| Cash Peterman | K | 6'0" | 180 | Freshman | |
| Mike Petty | DL | 6'3" | 215 | Freshman | |
| Beau Robinson | RB | 6'1" | 190 | Freshman | |
| Tanner Wall | WR | 6'1" | 175 | Freshman | |
| Viliami Tausinga | LB | 6'1" | 210 | Freshman | |
| Cade Hoke | LB | 6'0" | 220 | Freshman | |
| Jacob Bosco | LB | 6'2" | 235 | Freshman | |

=== 2021 other additions ===
| Name | Pos. | Height | Weight | Year | Notes |
|---|---|---|---|---|---|
| Dean Jones | DB | 6'2" | 190 | Freshman | Originally Signed in 2020 |
| Josh Larsen | DL | 6'4" | 230 | Freshman | Originally Signed in 2020 |
| John Nelson | DL | 6'4" | 260 | Freshman | Originally Signed in 2020 |
| Blake Mangelson | DL | 6'5" | 215 | Freshman | Originally Signed in 2020 |
| Samson Nacua | WR | 6'3" | 195 | Senior | Transfer from University of Utah |
| Puka Nacua | WR | 6'2" | 190 | Junior | Transfer from University of Washington |
| Nick Billoups | QB | 6'2" | 193 | Freshman | Transfer from University of Utah |
| Cade Fennegan | QB | 6'2" | 190 | Freshman | Transfer from Boise State University |
| Jakob Robinson | DB | 5'10" | 165 | Freshman | Transfer from Utah State University |
| Hunter Hill | OL | 6'5" | 285 | Freshman | Transfer from Utah State University |
| Kaleb Hayes | DB | 5'11" | 190 | Freshman | Transfer from Oregon State University |
| Tyler Little | OL | 6'7" | 260 | Freshman | Transfer from Butte College |
| Cade Parrish | OL | 6'5" | 295 | Freshman | Transfer from Snow College |

=== 2021 departures ===
| Name | Pos. | Height | Weight | Year | Notes |
|---|---|---|---|---|---|
| Zayne Anderson | DB | 6'2" | 210 | Senior | Graduation |
| Isaiah Kaufusi | LB | 6'2" | 220 | Senior | Graduation |
| Matt Bushman | TE | 6'5" | 240 | Senior | Graduation |
| Troy Warner | DB | 6'1" | 200 | Senior | Graduation |
| Khyiris Tonga | DL | 6'4" | 321 | Senior | Graduation |
| Jeddy Tuiloma | DL | 6'1" | 300 | Senior | Graduation |
| Chris Wilcox | DB | 6'2" | 195 | Senior | Graduation |
| Tristen Hoge | OL | 6'5" | 310 | Senior | Graduation |
| Chandon Herring | OL | 6'7" | 310 | Senior | Graduation |
| Bracken El-Bakri | DL | 6'3" | 286 | Senior | Graduation |
| Zac Dawe | DL | 6'4" | 271 | Senior | Graduation |
| Sam Lee | LB | 6'0" | 220 | Senior | Graduation |
| Kieffer Longson | OL | 6'7" | 315 | Senior | Graduation |
| Kavika Fonua | LB | 6'0" | 205 | Senior | Graduation |
| Samuel Allred | DB | 6'0" | 205 | Senior | Graduation |
| Kyle Griffitts | TE | 6'3" | 245 | Senior | Graduation |
| Brady Christensen | OL | 6'6" | 300 | Junior | NFL Draft |
| Zach Wilson | QB | 6'3" | 210 | Junior | NFL Draft |
| Dax Milne | WR | 6'1" | 190 | Junior | NFL Draft |
| Petey Tuipoluto | DB | 6'3" | 190 | Freshman | Mission |
| Hirkely Latu | DL | 6'3" | 235 | Sophomore | Transfer |
| Chase Wester | RB | 5'11" | 195 | Junior | Transfer |
| Seleti Fevaleaki | DL | 6'3" | 270 | Freshman | Transfer |
| Wes Wright | DB | 6'1" | 175 | Sophomore | Transfer |
| Chase Hughes | LB | 6'1" | 214 | Sophomore | |
| Joe Nelson | WR | 6'3" | 190 | Freshman | |
| Chayce Bolli | WR | 6'0" | 190 | Freshman | |
| Luc Andrada | RB | 5'10" | 175 | Freshman | |
| Keanu Saleapaga | OL | 6'6" | 310 | Junior | |
| Andrew Slack | OL | 6'5" | 300 | Freshman | |
| Hank Tuipulotu | TE | 6'3" | 240 | Freshman | |
| Freddy Livai | DL | 6'3" | 260 | Freshman | |
| Truman Andrus | LB | 6'2" | 215 | Freshman | |
| Preston Lewis | LB | 6'2" | 240 | Freshman | |
| Mo Unutoa | OL | 6'5" | 290 | Sophomore | |
| Tavita Gagnier | LB | 6'2" | 196 | Freshman | |

== Schedule ==
| Date | Time | Opponent | Rank | Site | TV | Result | Attendance |
|---|---|---|---|---|---|---|---|
| September 4 | 8:30 p.m. | vs. Arizona | | Allegiant Stadium; Paradise, NV (Vegas Kickoff Classic) | ESPN | W 24–16 | 54,541 |
| September 11 | 8:15 p.m. | No. 21 Utah | | LaVell Edwards Stadium; Provo, UT (Beehive Boot & Holy War) | ESPN | W 26–17 | 63,470 |
| September 18 | 8:15 p.m. | No. 19 Arizona State | No. 23 | LaVell Edwards Stadium; Provo, UT | ESPN | W 27–17 | 61,570 |
| September 25 | 8:15 p.m. | South Florida | No. 15 | LaVell Edwards Stadium; Provo, UT | ESPN2 | W 35–27 | 60,217 |
| October 1 | 7:00 p.m. | at Utah State | No. 13 | Maverik Stadium; Logan, UT (Beehive Boot & The Old Wagon Wheel) | CBSSN | W 34–20 | 25,240 |
| October 9 | 1:30 p.m. | Boise State^{†} | No. 10 | LaVell Edwards Stadium; Provo, UT | ABC | L 17–26 | 63,470 |
| October 16 | 1:30 p.m. | at Baylor | No. 19 | McLane Stadium; Waco, TX | ESPN | L 24–38 | 48,016 |
| October 23 | 1:30 p.m. | at Washington State | | Martin Stadium; Pullman, WA | FS1 | W 21–19 | 22,541 |
| October 30 | 8:15 p.m. | Virginia | No. 25 | LaVell Edwards Stadium; Provo, UT | ESPN2 | W 66–49 | 57,685 |
| November 6 | 1:30 p.m. | Idaho State | No. 15 | LaVell Edwards Stadium; Provo, UT | BYUtv | W 59–14 | 63,470 |
| November 20 | 2:00 p.m. | at Georgia Southern | No. 14 | Paulson Stadium; Statesboro, GA | ESPN+ | W 34–17 | 20,862 |
| November 27 | 8:30 p.m. | at USC | No. 13 | Los Angeles Memorial Coliseum; Los Angeles, CA | ESPN | W 35–31 | 55,926 |
| December 18 | 1:30 p.m. | vs. UAB | No. 13 | Independence Stadium; Shreveport, LA (Independence Bowl) | ABC | L 28–31 | 26,276 |
^{†}Homecoming; Rankings from AP Poll (and CFP Rankings, after November 2) - Released prior to game; All times are in Mountain time

== Rankings ==
Ranking movements Legend: ██ Increase in ranking ██ Decrease in ranking RV = Received votes
| | Week | | | | | | | | | | | | | | | |
| Poll | Pre | 1 | 2 | 3 | 4 | 5 | 6 | 7 | 8 | 9 | 10 | 11 | 12 | 13 | 14 | Final |
|---|---|---|---|---|---|---|---|---|---|---|---|---|---|---|---|---|
| AP | RV | RV | 23 | 15 | 13 | 10 | 19 | RV | 25 | 17 | 14 | 14 | 13 | 12 | 12 | 19 |
| Coaches | RV | RV | 23 | 16 | 15 | 10 | 20 | RV | RV | 20 | 15 | 15 | 15 | 14 | 14 | 22 |
| CFP | Not released | | | | | | | | | 15 | 14 | 14 | 13 | 12 | 13 | Not released |

== Broadcasting team ==
The NuSkin BYU Sports Network is owned and operated by BYU Radio and features Greg Wrubell (play-by-play), Riley Nelson (analyst), Mitchell Juergens (reporter/sideline analyst), and Jason Shepherd (host) for the third consecutive year. Ben Bagley substituted for Shepherd when Shepherd had women's soccer or men's basketball broadcasts. The network is in charge of producing and broadcasting all BYU Football pre- and post- game shows, coaches shows, and live broadcasts.

=== Affiliates ===
These affiliate stations broadcast the shows live as part of the network simulcast.

- BYU Radio – Flagship Station Nationwide (Dish Network 980, Sirius XM 143, KBYU 89.1 FM HD 2, TuneIn radio, and byuradio.org)
- KSL 102.7 FM and 1160 AM – (Salt Lake City / Provo, Utah and ksl.com)
- KSNA – Blackfoot / Idaho Falls / Pocatello / Rexburg, Idaho (games)
- KSPZ – Blackfoot / Idaho Falls / Pocatello / Rexburg, Idaho (coaches' shows)
- KMXD – Monroe / Manti, Utah
- KSVC – Richfield / Manti, Utah
- KDXU – St. George, Utah

== Personnel ==
=== Coaching staff ===
| Name | Position |
|---|---|
| Kalani Sitake | Head coach |
| Ed Lamb | Assistant head coach/special teams/safeties coach |
| Aaron Roderick | Offensive coordinator/quarterbacks coach |
| Darrell Funk | Offensive line coach |
| Fesi Sitake | Passing game coordinator/wide receivers coach |
| Steve Clark | Tight end coach |
| Ilaisa Tuiaki | Defensive coordinator/Interior Defensive line coach |
| Preston Hadley | Defensive ends/Hybrids coach |
| Jernaro Gilford | Cornerbacks coach |
| Harvey Unga | Running backs coach |
| Kevin Clune | Linebackers coach |

=== Roster ===
2021 BYU Cougars football team roster
Players
Coaches
Offense

| Pos. | # | Name | Class |
|---|---|---|---|
| QB | 17 | Jacob Conover | Fr |
| QB | 15 | Nick Billoups | Fr |
| QB | 11 | Cade Fennegan | Fr |
| QB | 3 | Jaren Hall | So |
| QB | 16 | Baylor Romney | So |
| QB | 10 | Sol-Jay Maiava-Peters | Fr |
| QB | 19 | Rhett Reilly | So |
| OL | 74 | Campbell Barrington | Fr |
| OL | 56 | Clark Barrington | So |
| OL | 65 | Chandler Bird | Fr |
| OL | 66 | James Empey (injured) | Jr |
| OL | 71 | Blake Freeland | So |
| OL | 75 | JT Gentry | So |
| OL | 67 | Brock Gunderson | Fr |
| OL | 77 | Donovan Hanna | Fr |
| OL | 61 | Hunter Hill | Fr |
| OL | 64 | Brayden Keim | So |
| OL | 76 | Harris LaChance | So |
| OL | 73 | Tysen Lewis (injured) | Fr |
| OL | 60 | Tyler Little | Fr |
| OL | 62 | Cooper McMullin | Fr |
| OL | 78 | Cade Parrish | Fr |
| OL | 50 | Burke Parker | Fr |
| OL | 70 | Connor Pay | Fr |
| OL | 63 | Dylan Rollins | Fr |
| OL | 52 | Joe Tukuafu | Jr |
| OL | 72 | Seth Willis | Fr |
| RB | 25 | Tyler Allgeier | So |
| RB | 19 | Miles Davis | Fr |
| RB | 22 | Mason Fakahua | Fr |
| RB | 4 | Lopini Katoa | Jr |
| RB | 21 | Jackson McChesney | Fr |
| RB | 7 | Hinckley Ropati | So |
| RB | 27 | Beau Robinson | Fr |
| TE | 97 | Ethan Erickson | Fr |
| TE | 82 | Bentley Hanshaw | Fr |
| TE | 32 | Dallin Holker | So |
| TE | 80 | Lane Lunt | Jr |
| TE | 83 | Isaac Rex (injured) | Fr |
| TE | 35 | Ben Tuipulotu | Fr |
| TE | 13 | Masen Wake | So |
| TE | 96 | Carter Wheat | Fr |
| WR | 86 | Maguire Anderson | Fr |
| WR | 85 | Brayden Cosper (injured) | So |
| WR | 0 | Kody Epps (injured) | Fr |
| WR | 88 | Terence Fall | Fr |
| WR | 36 | Talmage Gunther | Fr |
| WR | 1 | Keanu Hill | Fr |
| WR | 5 | Chris Jackson | Jr |
| WR | 89 | Kade Moore | Fr |
| WR | 12 | Puka Nacua | So |
| WR | 45 | Samson Nacua | Sr |
| WR | 23 | Hobbs Nyberg | Fr |
| WR | 2 | Neil Pau'u (injured) | Jr |
| WR | 27 | Chase Roberts | Fr |
| WR | 18 | Gunner Romney | Jr |
| WR | 85 | Tanner Wall | Fr |

Defense

| Pos. | # | Name | Class |
|---|---|---|---|
| DB | 3 | Chaz Ah You | So |
| DB | 25 | Talan Alfrey (injured) | Fr |
| DB | 20 | Jacob Boren | So |
| DB | 19 | Javelle Brown | Fr |
| DB | 4 | Caleb Christensen | Fr |
| DB | 17 | Matthew Criddle | Jr |
| DB | 2 | Keenan Ellis (injured) | Jr |
| DB | 27 | Sione Finau | So |
| DB | 22 | Ammon Hannemann | Fr |
| DB | 1 | Micah Harper (injured) | Fr |
| DB | 18 | Kaleb Hayes | Jr |
| DB | 11 | Isaiah Herron | So |
| DB | 21 | Dean Jones | Fr |
| DB | 43 | Jared Kapisi | Sr |
| DB | 28 | Hayden Livingston | So |
| DB | 5 | D'Angelo Mandell | Jr |
| DB | 30 | Jason Money | Jr |
| DB | 12 | Malik Moore | Jr |
| DB | 41 | Nick Nethercott | Fr |
| DB | 26 | Mitchell Price | Jr |
| DB | 10 | Morgan Pyper | So |
| DB | 30 | Quenton Rice | Fr |
| DB | 0 | Jakob Robinson | Fr |
| DB | 35 | Ethan Slade | Fr |
| DB | 7 | George Udo | So |
| DB | 15 | Jaylon Vickers (injured) | So |
| DB | 29 | Shamon Willis | Jr |
| DB | 13 | Jaques Wilson | Jr |
| DL | 92 | Tyler Batty | Fr |
| DL | 55 | Lorenzo Fauatea (injured) | Jr |
| DL | 97 | Hunter Greer | Fr |
| DL | 95 | Caden Haws | Fr |
| DL | 53 | Fisher Jackson | Fr |
| DL | 57 | Josh Larsen | Fr |
| DL | 58 | Uriah Leiataua | Sr |
| DL | 93 | Blake Mangelson | Fr |
| DL | 62 | Atunaisa Mahe | So |
| DL | 48 | Alex Muti | Fr |
| DL | 94 | John Nelson | Fr |
| DL | 90 | Jacob Palu (injured) | Fr |
| DL | 42 | Mike Petty | Fr |
| DL | 99 | Alema Pilimai | So |
| DL | 54 | Kade Pupunu | Fr |
| DL | 59 | Joshua Singh | Fr |
| DL | 98 | Gabe Summers | So |
| DL | 51 | Alden Tofa | Jr |
| DL | 91 | Earl Tuioti-Mariner | Jr |
| LB | 42 | Jacob Bosco | Fr |
| LB | 33 | Ben Bywater | Fr |
| LB | 47 | Theo Dawson | So |
| LB | 36 | Cade Hoke | Fr |
| LB | 46 | Drew Jensen | So |
| LB | 38 | Jackson Kaufusi | So |
| LB | 37 | Isaac Matua | Fr |
| LB | 41 | Keenan Pili (injured) | So |
| LB | 45 | Pepe Tanuvasa | Jr |
| LB | 47 | Viliami Tausinga | Fr |
| LB | 31 | Max Tooley | So |
| LB | 49 | Payton Wilgar (injured) | So |
| LB | 34 | Josh Wilson | Fr |

Special teams

| Pos. | # | Name | Class |
|---|---|---|---|
| DS | 87 | Britton Hogan | So |
| DS | 84 | Austin Riggs | Fr |
| P | 24 | Ryan Rehkow | Fr |
| K | 99 | Cash Peterman | Fr |
| K | 39 | Jake Oldroyd | So |
| K | 37 | Justen Smith | Fr |

Head coach

- Kalani Sitake (BYU)

Coordinators/assistant coaches

- Ed Lamb (BYU)
  Assistant head coach, Special Teams, Safeties
- Aaron Roderick (BYU)
  Offensive coordinator/quarterbacks
- Darrell Funk (Colorado State)
  Offensive line
- Fesi Sitake (Southern Utah)
  Passing Game Coordintor/wide receivers
- Steve Clark (BYU)
  Tight ends
- Harvey Unga (BYU)
  Running backs
- Ilaisa Tuiaki (Southern Utah)
  Defensive coordinator, Interior Defensive line
- Jernaro Gilford (BYU)
  Cornerbacks
- Preston Hadley (BYU)
  Defensive ends/Hybrids
- Kevin Clune (Cal State Fullerton)
  Linebackers
- Nu'u Tafisi (California)
  Director of strength and conditioning
- Justin McClure (Northern Colorado)
  Football strength and conditioning coach
- Kalani Simeona (BYU)
  Football strength and conditioning coach
- Jon Swift (BYU)
  Director of football operations
- Jack Damuni (BYU)
  Director of On-campus Recruiting and Community/Player Relations
- Jasen Ah You (BYU)
  Director of recruiting and Player Personnel
- Blair Peterson (Towson)
  Offensive analyst
- Alfred Pupunu (Weber State)
  Offensive analyst
- Vince Feula (BYU)
  Defensive analyst
- Randy Coy Jr. (Utah Valley)
  Defensive and Special teams analyst
- Jordan Howard (Utah)
  Offensive graduate assistant
- Spencer Patterson (Utah Tech)
  Offensive graduate assistant
- Kyle Griffitts (BYU)
  Defensive graduate assistant
- Gavin Fowler (BYU)
  Defensive graduate assistant

Legend

- (C) Team captain
- (S) Suspended
- (I) Ineligible
- Injured
- Redshirt

Roster

=== Depth chart ===
Defense

FS
Malik Moore
Hayden Livingston
Jared Kapisi

| WLB | MLB | SLB |
|---|---|---|
| Ben Bywater | Max Tooley | Chaz Ah You |
| Drew Jensen | Josh Wilson | Jackson Kaufusi |
| Morgan Pyper | Kade Pupunu | Matt Criddle |

SS
George Udo
Ammon Hannemann
Jacob Boren

CB
D'Angelo Mandell
Isaiah Herron
Shamon Willis

| DE | DT | DT | DE |
|---|---|---|---|
| Tyler Batty | Atunaisa Mahe | Earl Tuioti-Mariner | Uriah Leiataua |
| Blake Mangelson | Caden Haws | Gabe Summers | Pepe Tanuvasa |
| Alden Tofa | John Nelson | Josh Larsen | Fisher Jackson |

CB
Jakob Robinson
Kaleb Hayes
Javelle Brown

Offense

X-Receiver
Gunner Romney
Samson Nacua
Chris Jackson

| LT | LG | C | RG | RT |
|---|---|---|---|---|
| Blake Freeland | Clark Barrington | Connor Pay | Joe Tukuafu | Harris LaChance |
| Brayden Keim | Seth Willis | Joe Tukuafu | Campbell Barrington | Campbell Barrington |
| Donavon Hanna | Dylan Rollins | Cade Parrish | Tyler Little | JT Gentry |

TE
Dallin Holker
Carter Wheat
Lane Lunt

Z-Receiver
Puka Nacua
Keanu Hill
Hobbs Nyborg

QB
Jaren Hall
Baylor Romney
Jacob Conover

Key reserves
DB Caleb Christensen
TE Ben Tuipulotu
DB Mitchell Price
DB Nick Nethercott
DB Sione Finau
WR Terence Fall
WR Tanner Wall
WR Talmage Gunther

RB
Tyler Allgeier
Lopini Katoa
Jackson McChesney

FB
Masen Wake
Hinckley Ropati
Mason Fakahua

Special teams
PK Jake Oldroyd
PK Justen Smith
P Ryan Rehkow
P Cash Peterman
KR Hobbs Nyborg
KR Caleb Christensen
PR Hobbs Nyborg
PR Talmage Gunther
LS Austin Riggs
LS Britton Hogan
H Ryan Rehkow
H Hayden Livingston

== Game summaries ==
=== Vegas Kickoff: Arizona ===
BYU vs. Arizona

| Team | 1 | 2 | 3 | 4 | Total |
|---|---|---|---|---|---|
| • Cougars | 0 | 14 | 7 | 3 | 24 |
| Wildcats | 0 | 3 | 10 | 3 | 16 |

- Date: September 4
- Location: Allegiant Stadium
  Paradise, Nevada
- Game start: 7:40 p.m. PDT
- Elapsed time: 3:54
- Game attendance: 54,541
- Game weather: Indoors
- Referee: Kevin Mar • Umpire: Marlow Fitzgerald • Linesman: Bradford Edwards • Line judge: Scott Reilly • Back judge: Lyndon Nixon • Field judge: Randy Smith • Side judge: Jim Murphy • Center judge: Darren Winkley
- TV announcers (ESPN): Dave Flemming, Rod Gilmore, and Stormy Buonantony

Uniform combination: royal helmets, royal jersey, royal pants w/ white accents

Scoring summary

| Quarter | Time | Drive | | | Team | Scoring information | Score | |
| Quarter | Time | Plays | Yards | TOP | Team | Scoring information | BYU | ARIZ |
|---|---|---|---|---|---|---|---|---|
| 2 | 9:17 | 9 | 73 | 3:58 | BYU | Tyler Allgeier 15-yard touchdown run, 2-point run by Ryan Rehkow failed after PAT attempt was fumbled | 6 | 0 |
| 2 | 9:17 | 5 | 80 | 2:26 | BYU | Neil Pau'u 67-yard touchdown reception from Jaren Hall, 2-point pass to Lopini Katoa good | 14 | 0 |
| 2 | 5:00 | 11 | 65 | 1:47 | ARIZ | 28-yard field goal by Lucas Havrisk | 14 | 3 |
| 3 | 7:28 | 9 | 80 | 4:48 | BYU | Neil Pau'u 6-yard touchdown reception from Jaren Hall, Justen Smith kick good | 21 | 3 |
| 3 | 3:12 | | | | ARIZ | Lopini Katoa tackled in end zone for a safety by Trevon Mason & Rashie Hodge Jr. | 21 | 5 |
| 3 | 2:00 | 3 | 46 | 1:05 | ARIZ | BJ Casteel 29-yard touchdown reception from Gunner Cruz, 2-point Gunner Cruz pass to BJ Casteel good | 21 | 13 |
| 4 | 7:34 | 8 | 51 | 4:08 | BYU | 40-yard field goal by Justen Smith | 24 | 13 |
| 4 | 0:49 | 12 | 65 | 2:35 | ARIZ | 37-yard field goal by Lucas Havrisk | 24 | 16 |
| "TOP" = time of possession. For other American football terms, see Glossary of American football. | | | | | | | 24 | 16 |

| Statistics | BYU | Arizona |
|---|---|---|
| First downs | 18 | 27 |
| Plays–yards | 60–350 | 83–426 |
| Rushes–yards | 31–163, 1 TD | 35–81 |
| Passing yards | 207 | 345 |
| Passing: comp–att–int | 19–29–0, 2 TD's | 36–48–1, 1 TD |
| Turnovers | | |
| Time of possession | 28:11 | 31:07 |

| Team | Category | Player | Statistics |
|---|---|---|---|
| BYU | Passing | Jaren Hall | 18–28–0, 198 yards, 2 TD's |
| BYU | Rushing | Tyler Allgeier | 17 carries, 94 yards, 1 TD |
| BYU | Receiving | Neil Pau'u | 8 receptions, 126 yards, 2 TD's |
| Arizona | Passing | Gunner Cruz | 34–45–1, 336 yards, 1 TD |
| Arizona | Rushing | Michael Wiley | 15 carries, 64 yards |
| Arizona | Receiving | Stanley Berryhill | 12 receptions, 102 yards |

=== No. 21 Utah ===
Utah at BYU

| Team | 1 | 2 | 3 | 4 | Total |
|---|---|---|---|---|---|
| No. 21/18 Utes | 0 | 7 | 0 | 10 | 17 |
| • Cougars | 3 | 13 | 7 | 3 | 26 |

- Date: September 11
- Location: LaVell Edwards Stadium
  Provo, Utah
- Game start: 8:25 p.m. MDT
- Elapsed time: 3:21
- Game attendance: 63,470
- Game weather: 70 °F (21 °C), Winds NNW 3 mph; Sunny to Partly Cloudy w/ rain in the 4th
- Referee: Chris Coyte • Umpire: Greg Adams • Linesman: Darryl Johnson • Line judge: Johathan Stabile • Back judge: Antony Little • Field judge: Steve Currie • Side judge: Jeff Dahle • Center judge: Dwayne Johnson
- TV announcers (ESPN): Dave Flemming, Rod Gilmore, and Alex Chappell

Uniform combination: white helmets, royal jersey w/ white stripes, white pants w/ royal accents

Scoring summary

| Quarter | Time | Drive | | | Team | Scoring information | Score | |
| Quarter | Time | Plays | Yards | TOP | Team | Scoring information | UTAH | BYU |
|---|---|---|---|---|---|---|---|---|
| 1 | 4:15 | 7 | 23 | 2:56 | BYU | 37-yard field goal by Jake Oldroyd | 0 | 3 |
| 2 | 10:37 | 14 | 72 | 7:19 | BYU | Neil Pau'u 4-yard touchdown reception from Jaren Hall, Jake Oldroyd kick good | 0 | 10 |
| 2 | 7:22 | 6 | 80 | 3:15 | UTAH | Brant Kuithe 20-yard touchdown reception from Charlie Brewer, Jadon Redding kick good | 7 | 10 |
| 2 | 0:04 | 11 | 93 | 3:10 | BYU | Samson Nacua 2-yard touchdown reception from Jaren Hall, Jake Oldroyd kick no good | 7 | 16 |
| 3 | 0:38 | 10 | 69 | 3:57 | BYU | Gunner Romney 4-yard touchdown reception from Jaren Hall, Jake Oldroyd kick good | 7 | 23 |
| 4 | 14:07 | 5 | 46 | 1:31 | UTAH | 47-yard field goal by Jadon Redding | 10 | 23 |
| 4 | 9:31 | 5 | 55 | 2:15 | UTAH | Micah Bernard 22-yard touchdown run, Jadon Redding kick good | 17 | 23 |
| 4 | 3:17 | 12 | 71 | 6:14 | BYU | 21-yard field goal by Jake Oldroyd | 17 | 26 |
| "TOP" = time of possession. For other American football terms, see Glossary of American football. | | | | | | | 17 | 26 |

| Statistics | Utah | BYU |
|---|---|---|
| First downs | 15 | 21 |
| Plays–yards | 51–340 | 76–380 |
| Rushes–yards | 25–193, 1 TD | 46–231 |
| Passing yards | 147 | 149 |
| Passing: comp–att–int | 15–26–1, 1 TD | 18–30–0, 3 TD's |
| Turnovers | | |
| Time of possession | 24:34 | 35:26 |

| Team | Category | Player | Statistics |
|---|---|---|---|
| Utah | Passing | Charlie Brewer | 15–26–1, 147 yards, 1 TD |
| Utah | Rushing | Micah Bernard | 12 carries, 146 yards, 1 TD |
| Utah | Receiving | Dalton Kincaid | 1 reception, 37 yard |
| BYU | Passing | Jaren Hall | 18–30–0, 149 yards, 3 TD's |
| BYU | Rushing | Tyler Allgeier | 27 carries, 102 yards |
| BYU | Receiving | Puka Nacua | 4 receptions, 37 yards |

=== No. 19 Arizona State ===
Arizona State at BYU

| Team | 1 | 2 | 3 | 4 | Total |
|---|---|---|---|---|---|
| No. 19/21 Sun Devils | 7 | 0 | 10 | 0 | 17 |
| • No. 23/23 Cougars | 7 | 14 | 0 | 6 | 27 |

- Date: September 18
- Location: LaVell Edwards Stadium
  Provo, Utah
- Game start: 8:20 p.m. MDT
- Elapsed time: 3:28
- Game attendance: 61,570
- Game weather: 68 °F (20 °C), Winds SE 10 mph; Partly Cloudy w/ 15% chance of rain
- Referee: Matthew Richards • Umpire: Mike Stephens • Linesman: Rich Troyer • Line judge: Dale Keller • Back judge: Steve Steichen • Field judge: Brad Glenn • Side judge: Max Causey • Center judge: John Love
- TV announcers (ESPN): Dave Flemming, Rod Gilmore, and Stormy Buonantony

Uniform combination: white helmets, white jersey w/ royal stripes, white pants w/ royal accents

Scoring summary

| Quarter | Time | Drive | | | Team | Scoring information | Score | |
| Quarter | Time | Plays | Yards | TOP | Team | Scoring information | ASU | BYU |
|---|---|---|---|---|---|---|---|---|
| 1 | 14:23 | 3 | 12 | 0:31 | BYU | Tyler Allgeier 3-yard touchdown run, Justen Smith kick good | 0 | 7 |
| 1 | 11:10 | 6 | 75 | 3:13 | ASU | Rachaad White 1-yard touchdown run, Cristian Zendejas kick good | 7 | 7 |
| 2 | 8:54 | 6 | 83 | 2:06 | BYU | Gunner Romney 34-yard touchdown reception from Jaren Hall, Justen Smith kick good | 7 | 14 |
| 2 | 4:40 | 8 | 74 | 2:33 | BYU | Isaac Rex 15-yard touchdown reception from Jaren Hall, Justen Smith kick good | 7 | 21 |
| 3 | 9:42 | 9 | 80 | 4:23 | ASU | Daniyel Ngata 10-yard touchdown run, Cristian Zendejas kick good | 14 | 21 |
| 3 | 3:40 | 11 | 43 | 5:10 | ASU | 40-yard field goal by Cristian Zendejas | 17 | 21 |
| 4 | 4:40 | 12 | 77 | 5:18 | BYU | Isaac Rex 3-yard touchdown reception from Baylor Romney, 2-point run kneeled down by Baylor Romney | 17 | 27 |
| "TOP" = time of possession. For other American football terms, see Glossary of American football. | | | | | | | 17 | 27 |

| Statistics | ASU | BYU |
|---|---|---|
| First downs | 19 | 24 |
| Plays–yards | 62–426 | 67–361 |
| Rushes–yards | 33–161, 2 TD's | 39–144, 1 TD |
| Passing yards | 265 | 217 |
| Passing: comp–att–int | 21–29–2 | 16–28–2, 3 TD's |
| Turnovers | | |
| Time of possession | 32:23 | 27:37 |

| Team | Category | Player | Statistics |
|---|---|---|---|
| ASU | Passing | Jayden Daniels | 21–29–2, 265 yards |
| ASU | Rushing | Daniyel Ngata | 8 carries, 82 yards, 1 TD |
| ASU | Receiving | Rachaad White | 9 receptions, 65 yards |
| BYU | Passing | Jaren Hall | 15–27–2, 214 yards, 2 TD's |
| BYU | Rushing | Tyler Allgeier | 21 carries, 69 yards, 1 TD |
| BYU | Receiving | Gunner Romney | 6 receptions, 95 yards, 1 TD |

=== USF ===
USF at BYU

| Team | 1 | 2 | 3 | 4 | Total |
|---|---|---|---|---|---|
| Bulls | 0 | 6 | 14 | 7 | 27 |
| • No. 15/16 Cougars | 21 | 7 | 7 | 0 | 35 |

- Date: September 25
- Location: LaVell Edwards Stadium
  Provo, Utah
- Game start: 8:25 p.m. MDT
- Elapsed time: 3:05
- Game attendance: 60,217
- Game weather: 72 °F (22 °C), Winds NW 1 mph; Clear
- Referee: Luke Richmond • Umpire: Joe Pennucci • Linesman: Dan Harrington • Line judge: Alex Amaya • Back judge: Chris Bikowski • Field judge: Ben Vasconcells • Side judge: Jake Dishaw • Center judge: Anthony Calabrese
- TV announcers (ESPN2): Beth Mowins, Kirk Morrison, and Dawn Davenport

Uniform combination: white helmets, navy jersey w/ white stripes, white pants w/ navy accents

Scoring summary

| Quarter | Time | Drive | | | Team | Scoring information | Score | |
| Quarter | Time | Plays | Yards | TOP | Team | Scoring information | USF | BYU |
|---|---|---|---|---|---|---|---|---|
| 1 | 13:05 | 4 | 75 | 1:55 | BYU | Masen Wake 5-yard touchdown reception from Baylor Romney, Justen Smith kick good | 0 | 7 |
| 1 | 9:16 | 5 | 65 | 1:44 | BYU | Tyler Allgeier 1-yard touchdown run, Justen Smith kick good | 0 | 14 |
| 1 | 4:20 | 8 | 34 | 3:33 | BYU | Tyler Allgeier 1-yard touchdown run, Justen Smith kick good | 0 | 21 |
| 2 | 12:41 | 13 | 69 | 6:35 | USF | 29-yard field goal by Spencer Shrader | 3 | 21 |
| 2 | 4:57 | 12 | 62 | 5:07 | USF | 42-yard field goal by Spencer Shrader | 6 | 21 |
| 2 | 1:06 | 7 | 75 | 3:51 | BYU | Neil Pau'u 9-yard touchdown reception from Baylor Romney, Justen Smith kick good | 6 | 28 |
| 3 | 7:25 | 14 | 75 | 7:35 | USF | Xavier Weaver 3-yard touchdown run, Spencer Shrader kick good | 13 | 28 |
| 3 | 5:40 | 4 | 75 | 1:45 | BYU | Gunner Romney 47-yard touchdown reception from Baylor Romney, Justen Smith kick good | 13 | 35 |
| 3 | 3:03 | 6 | 54 | 2:30 | USF | Jaren Mangham 2-yard touchdown run, Spencer Shrader kick good | 20 | 35 |
| 4 | 5:41 | 19 | 94 | 9:05 | USF | Jaren Mangham 1-yard touchdown run, Spencer Shrader kick good | 27 | 35 |
| "TOP" = time of possession. For other American football terms, see Glossary of American football. | | | | | | | 27 | 35 |

| Statistics | USF | BYU |
|---|---|---|
| First downs | 23 | 21 |
| Plays–yards | 72–367 | 50–443 |
| Rushes–yards | 48–185, 3 TD's | 25–138, 2 TD's |
| Passing yards | 186 | 305 |
| Passing: comp–att–int | 17–24–0 | 20–25–0, 3 TD's |
| Turnovers | | |
| Time of possession | 35:37 | 24:23 |

| Team | Category | Player | Statistics |
|---|---|---|---|
| USF | Passing | Timmy McClain | 17–24–0, 186 yards |
| USF | Rushing | Jaren Mangham | 26 carries, 86 yards, 2 TD's |
| USF | Receiving | Xavier Weaver | 5 receptions, 76 yards |
| BYU | Passing | Baylor Romney | 20–25–0, 305 yards, 3 TD's |
| BYU | Rushing | Tyler Allgeier | 15 carries, 81 yards, 2 TD's |
| BYU | Receiving | Gunner Romney | 5 receptions, 119 yards, 1 TD |

=== Utah State ===
BYU at Utah State

| Team | 1 | 2 | 3 | 4 | Total |
|---|---|---|---|---|---|
| • No. 13/15 Cougars | 10 | 14 | 0 | 10 | 34 |
| Aggies | 3 | 10 | 0 | 7 | 20 |

- Date: October 1
- Location: Maverik Stadium
  Logan, Utah
- Game start: 7:01 p.m. MDT
- Elapsed time: 4:14
- Game attendance: 25,240
- Game weather: 78 °F (26 °C), Winds E 3 mph, Sunny
- Referee: Kevin Mar • Umpire: Marlow Fitzgerald • Linesman: Bradford Edwards • Line judge: Scott Reilly • Back judge: Lyndon Nixon • Field judge: Randy Smith • Side judge: Jim Murphy • Center judge: Darren Winkley
- TV announcers (CBSSN): Rich Waltz, Aaron Taylor, and Jenny Dell

Uniform combination: white helmets, white jersey w/ royal stripes, royal pants w/ white accents

Scoring summary

| Quarter | Time | Drive | | | Team | Scoring information | Score | |
| Quarter | Time | Plays | Yards | TOP | Team | Scoring information | BYU | USU |
|---|---|---|---|---|---|---|---|---|
| 1 | 9:16 | 3 | 74 | 1:33 | BYU | Tyler Allgeier 22-yard touchdown run, Jake Oldroyd kick good | 7 | 0 |
| 1 | 5:06 | 9 | 23 | 5:14 | BYU | 49-yard field goal by Jake Oldroyd | 10 | 0 |
| 1 | 3:20 | 7 | 40 | 1:46 | USU | 52-yard field goal by Connor Coles | 10 | 3 |
| 2 | 13:42 | 10 | 75 | 4:38 | BYU | Isaac Rex 15-yard touchdown reception from Baylor Romney, Jake Oldroyd kick good | 17 | 3 |
| 2 | 6:08 | 18 | 75 | 7:34 | USU | Justin McGriff 21-yard touchdown reception from Logan Bonner, Connor Coles kick good | 17 | 10 |
| 2 | 4:09 | 5 | 78 | 1:43 | BYU | Tyler Allgeier 59-yard touchdown run, Jake Oldroyd kick good | 24 | 10 |
| 2 | 0:55 | 11 | 47 | 3:14 | USU | 45-yard field goal by Connor Coles | 24 | 13 |
| 4 | 14:22 | 10 | 50 | 4:41 | BYU | 32-yard field goal by Jake Oldroyd | 27 | 13 |
| 4 | 9:52 | 14 | 90 | 4:23 | USU | Deven Thompkins 28-yard touchdown reception from Logan Bonner, Connor Coles kick good | 27 | 20 |
| 4 | 8:40 | 3 | 68 | 1:08 | BYU | Tyler Allgeier 1-yard touchdown run, Jake Oldroyd kick good | 34 | 20 |
| "TOP" = time of possession. For other American football terms, see Glossary of American football. | | | | | | | 34 | 20 |

| Statistics | BYU | USU |
|---|---|---|
| First downs | 22 | 24 |
| Plays–yards | 66–466 | 83–336 |
| Rushes–yards | 35–221, 3 TD's | 35–22 |
| Passing yards | 245 | 314 |
| Passing: comp–att–int | 22–30–0, 1 TD | 26–48–2, 2 TD's |
| Turnovers | | |
| Time of possession | 31:28 | 28:32 |

| Team | Category | Player | Statistics |
|---|---|---|---|
| BYU | Passing | Baylor Romney | 15–19–0, 187 yards, 1 TD |
| BYU | Rushing | Tyler Allgeier | 22 carries, 218 yards, 3 TD's |
| BYU | Receiving | Puka Nacua | 3 receptions, 62 yards |
| USU | Passing | Logan Bonner | 21–41–1, 276 yards, 2 TD's |
| USU | Rushing | Elelyon Noa | 8 carries, 13 yards |
| USU | Receiving | Deven Thompkins | 9 receptions, 125 yards, 1 TD |

=== Boise State ===
Boise State at BYU

| Team | 1 | 2 | 3 | 4 | Total |
|---|---|---|---|---|---|
| • Broncos | 3 | 17 | 3 | 3 | 26 |
| No. 10/10 Cougars | 10 | 0 | 0 | 7 | 17 |

- Date: October 9
- Location: LaVell Edwards Stadium
  Provo, Utah
- Game start: 1:41 p.m. MDT
- Elapsed time: 3:29
- Game attendance: 63,470
- Game weather: 49 °F (9 °C), Winds SW 6 mph; Cloudy w/ Rain on and off
- Referee: Cal McNeill • Umpire: David Williams • Linesman: George Shoup • Line judge: Steve Hoslett • Back judge: Alvin Moore • Field judge: Brian Woirfel • Side judge: Tom Bessant • Center judge: Charlie Hurd
- TV announcers (ABC): Dave Pasch, Dusty Dvoracek, and Tom Luginbill

Uniform combination: navy helmets, navy jersey w/ white stripes, navy pants w/ white accents

Scoring summary

| Quarter | Time | Drive | | | Team | Scoring information | Score | |
| Quarter | Time | Plays | Yards | TOP | Team | Scoring information | Boise | BYU |
|---|---|---|---|---|---|---|---|---|
| 1 | 10:24 | 10 | 62 | 4:36 | BYU | 30-yard field goal by Jake Oldroyd | 0 | 3 |
| 1 | 6:55 | 5 | 84 | 2:20 | BYU | Samson Nacua 14-yard touchdown reception from Jaren Hall, Jake Oldroyd kick no good | 0 | 10 |
| 2 | 1:25 | 14 | 59 | 5:26 | Boise | 41-yard field goal by Jonah Dalmas | 3 | 10 |
| 2 | 6:29 | 4 | 24 | 1:30 | Boise | Cyrus Habibi-Likio 11-yard touchdown run, Jonah Dalmas kick good | 10 | 10 |
| 2 | 3:34 | 5 | 23 | 2:48 | Boise | Andrew Van Buren 2-yard touchdown run, Jonah Dalmas kick good | 17 | 10 |
| 2 | 0:00 | 9 | 43 | 2:03 | Boise | 20-yard field goal by Jonah Dalmas | 20 | 10 |
| 3 | 8:20 | 13 | 54 | 6:31 | Boise | 28-yard field goal by Jonah Dalmas | 23 | 10 |
| 4 | 7:27 | 4 | 70 | 1:00 | BYU | Tyler Allgeier 1-yard touchdown run, Jake Oldroyd kick good | 23 | 17 |
| 4 | 3:27 | 9 | 71 | 4:00 | Boise | 22-yard field goal by Jonah Dalmas | 26 | 17 |
| "TOP" = time of possession. For other American football terms, see Glossary of American football. | | | | | | | 26 | 17 |

| Statistics | Boise | BYU |
|---|---|---|
| First downs | 24 | 24 |
| Plays–yards | 74–312 | 64–413 |
| Rushes–yards | 45–140, 2 TD's | 27–111, 1 TD |
| Passing yards | 172 | 302 |
| Passing: comp–att–int | 18–29–0 | 22–37–1, 1 TD |
| Turnovers | | |
| Time of possession | 33:27 | 26:33 |

| Team | Category | Player | Statistics |
|---|---|---|---|
| Boise | Passing | Hank Bachmeier | 18–29–0, 172 yards |
| Boise | Rushing | Cyrus Habibi-Likio | 18 carries, 75 yards, 1 TD |
| Boise | Receiving | Khalil Shakir | 8 receptions, 66 yards |
| BYU | Passing | Jaren Hall | 22–37–1, 302 yards, 1 TD |
| BYU | Rushing | Tyler Allgeier | 19 carries, 73 yards, 1 TD |
| BYU | Receiving | Gunner Romney | 6 receptions, 102 yards |

=== Baylor ===
BYU at Baylor

| Team | 1 | 2 | 3 | 4 | Total |
|---|---|---|---|---|---|
| No. 19/20 Cougars | 0 | 7 | 7 | 10 | 24 |
| • Bears | 3 | 14 | 14 | 7 | 38 |

- Date: October 16
- Location: McLane Stadium
  Waco, Texas
- Game start: 2:40 p.m. CDT
- Elapsed time: 3:16
- Game attendance: 48,016
- Game weather: 73 °F (23 °C), Winds NE 15 mph; Sunny
- Referee: Brandon Cruse • Umpire: Sheldon Davis • Linesman: Mike Moeller • Line judge: Jay Bilbo • Back judge: Donnie Aultman • Field judge: Scott Gaines • Side judge: Rick Ockey • Center judge: Marvel July
- TV announcers (ESPN): Mark Jones, Robert Griffin III, and Quint Kessenich

Uniform combination: navy helmets, white jersey w/ navy stripes, navy pants w/ white accents

Scoring summary

| Quarter | Time | Drive | | | Team | Scoring information | Score | |
| Quarter | Time | Plays | Yards | TOP | Team | Scoring information | BYU | BAY |
|---|---|---|---|---|---|---|---|---|
| 1 | 1:11 | 8 | 53 | 3:07 | BAY | 31-yard field goal by Isaiah Hankins | 0 | 3 |
| 2 | 12:17 | 8 | 75 | 3:54 | BYU | Tyler Allgeier 1-yard touchdown run, Jake Oldroyd kick good | 7 | 3 |
| 2 | 8:54 | 7 | 75 | 3:23 | BAY | Abram Smith 9-yard touchdown run, Isaiah Hankins kick good | 7 | 10 |
| 2 | 3:36 | 8 | 67 | 3:32 | BAY | Dillon Doyle 2-yard touchdown run, Isaiah Hankins kick good | 7 | 17 |
| 3 | 12:18 | 6 | 75 | 2:42 | BYU | Jaren Hall 56-yard touchdown run, Jake Oldroyd kick good | 14 | 17 |
| 3 | 7:55 | 9 | 78 | 4:18 | BAY | Dillon Doyle 2-yard touchdown reception from Gerry Bohanon, Isaiah Hankins kick good | 14 | 24 |
| 3 | 4:32 | 4 | 67 | 1:57 | BAY | Abram Smith 7-yard touchdown run, Isaiah Hankins kick good | 14 | 31 |
| 4 | 10:28 | 12 | 43 | 4:47 | BYU | 48-yard field goal by Jake Oldroyd | 17 | 31 |
| 4 | 3:55 | 12 | 82 | 6:33 | BAY | Abram Smith 1-yard touchdown run, Isaiah Hankins kick good | 17 | 38 |
| 4 | 1:51 | 7 | 75 | 2:04 | BYU | Puka Nacua 16-yard touchdown reception from Jaren Hall, Jake Oldroyd kick good | 24 | 38 |
| "TOP" = time of possession. For other American football terms, see Glossary of American football. | | | | | | | 24 | 38 |

| Statistics | BYU | BAY |
|---|---|---|
| First downs | 15 | 22 |
| Plays–yards | 55–409 | 75–534 |
| Rushes–yards | 24–67, 2 TD's | 47–303, 4 TD's |
| Passing yards | 342 | 231 |
| Passing: comp–att–int | 22–31–0, 1 TD | 18–28–1, 1 TD |
| Turnovers | | |
| Time of possession | 24:24 | 35:36 |

| Team | Category | Player | Statistics |
|---|---|---|---|
| BYU | Passing | Jaren Hall | 22–31–0, 342 yards, 1 TD |
| BYU | Rushing | Tyler Allgeier | 15 carries, 33 yards, 1 TD |
| BYU | Receiving | Puka Nacua | 5 receptions, 168 yards, 1 TD |
| BAY | Passing | Gerry Bohanon | 18–28–1, 231 yards, 1 TD |
| BAY | Rushing | Abram Smith | 27 carries, 188 yards, 3 TD's |
| BAY | Receiving | Tyquan Thornton | 5 receptions, 84 yards |

=== Washington State ===
BYU at Washington State

| Team | 1 | 2 | 3 | 4 | Total |
|---|---|---|---|---|---|
| • BYU Cougars | 7 | 0 | 7 | 7 | 21 |
| WSU Cougars | 7 | 0 | 6 | 6 | 19 |

- Date: October 23
- Location: Martin Stadium
  Pullman, Washington
- Game start: 12:36 p.m. PDT
- Elapsed time: 3:05
- Game attendance: 22,541
- Game weather: 51 °F (11 °C), Winds SE 7 mph; Cloudy
- Referee: Kevin Hassell • Umpire: Apollo Martin • Linesman: Al Green • Line judge: David Young • Back judge: Joel Wetzel • Field judge: Ed Vinzant • Side judge: Steve Heiman • Center judge: Stacy Hardin
- TV announcers (FS1): Cory Provus and Mark Helfrich

Uniform combination: white helmets, white jersey w/ navy stripes, white pants w/ navy accents

Scoring summary

| Quarter | Time | Drive | | | Team | Scoring information | Score | |
| Quarter | Time | Plays | Yards | TOP | Team | Scoring information | BYU | WSU |
|---|---|---|---|---|---|---|---|---|
| 1 | 9:36 | 10 | 75 | 5:24 | WSU | Max Borghi 11-yard touchdown run, Dean Janikowski kick good | 0 | 7 |
| 1 | 6:04 | 9 | 75 | 3:25 | BYU | Lopini Katoa 3-yard touchdown run, Jake Oldroyd kick good | 7 | 7 |
| 3 | 9:48 | 11 | 75 | 5:12 | BYU | Tyler Allgeier 11-yard touchdown run, Jake Oldroyd kick good | 14 | 7 |
| 3 | 5:08 | 10 | 69 | 4:34 | WSU | Max Borghi 1-yard touchdown run, 2-point pass from Nick Haberer incomplete after Haberer dropped the snap | 14 | 13 |
| 4 | 14:59 | 11 | 81 | 5:02 | BYU | Tyler Allgeier 2-yard touchdown run, Jake Oldroyd kick good | 21 | 13 |
| 4 | 4:14 | 11 | 76 | 5:59 | WSU | Max Borghi 1-yard touchdown run, 2-point pass from Lincoln Victor incomplete | 21 | 19 |
| "TOP" = time of possession. For other American football terms, see Glossary of American football. | | | | | | | 21 | 19 |

| Statistics | BYU | WSU |
|---|---|---|
| First downs | 22 | 20 |
| Plays–yards | 69–385 | 60–350 |
| Rushes–yards | 48–238, 3 TD's | 23–93, 3 TD's |
| Passing yards | 147 | 257 |
| Passing: comp–att–int | 16–21–0 | 26–37–1 |
| Turnovers | | |
| Time of possession | 29:37 | 30:23 |

| Team | Category | Player | Statistics |
|---|---|---|---|
| BYU | Passing | Jaren Hall | 15–20–0, 143 yards |
| BYU | Rushing | Tyler Allgeier | 32 carries, 191 yards, 2 TD's |
| BYU | Receiving | Neil Pau'u | 6 receptions, 70 yards |
| WSU | Passing | Jayden de Laura | 26–37–1, 257 yards |
| WSU | Rushing | Max Borghi | 18 carries, 83 yards, 3 TD's |
| WSU | Receiving | Travell Harris | 7 receptions, 60 yards |

=== Virginia ===
Virginia at BYU

| Team | 1 | 2 | 3 | 4 | Total |
|---|---|---|---|---|---|
| Cavaliers | 7 | 35 | 7 | 0 | 49 |
| • No. 25 Cougars | 21 | 17 | 7 | 21 | 66 |

- Date: October 30
- Location: LaVell Edwards Stadium
  Provo, Utah
- Game start: 8:25 p.m. MDT
- Elapsed time: 3:34
- Game attendance: 57,685
- Game weather: 55 °F (13 °C), Winds NE 4 mph; Clear
- Referee: Stuart Mullins • Umpire: Johnnie Fortie • Linesman: Steve Clein • Line judge: Colin Formulak • Back judge: Rob Luklan • Field judge: Mike Cullin • Side judge: George Liotus • Center judge: Adam Savole
- TV announcers (ESPN2): Beth Mowins, Kirk Morrison, and Dawn Davenport

Uniform combination: royal helmets, royal jersey w/ white stripes, white pants w/ royal accents

Scoring summary

| Quarter | Time | Drive | | | Team | Scoring information | Score | |
| Quarter | Time | Plays | Yards | TOP | Team | Scoring information | UVA | BYU |
|---|---|---|---|---|---|---|---|---|
| 1 | 12:43 | 4 | 83 | 1:18 | BYU | Jaren Hall 2-yard touchdown run, Jake Oldroyd kick good | 0 | 7 |
| 1 | 11:16 | 4 | 11 | 1:18 | BYU | Tyler Allgeier 1-yard touchdown run, Jake Oldroyd kick good | 0 | 14 |
| 1 | 8:04 | 5 | 74 | 1:40 | BYU | Puka Nacua 26-yard touchdown reception from Jaren Hall, Jake Oldroyd kick good | 0 | 21 |
| 1 | 3:22 | 12 | 75 | 4:42 | UVA | Brennan Armstrong 5-yard touchdown run, Brendan Farrell kick good | 7 | 21 |
| 2 | 14:13 | 10 | 75 | 4:09 | BYU | Tyler Allgeier 4-yard touchdown run, Jake Oldroyd kick good | 7 | 28 |
| 2 | 12:29 | 4 | 75 | 1:44 | UVA | Jelani Woods 40-yard touchdown reception from Brennan Armstrong, Brendan Farrell kick good | 14 | 28 |
| 2 | 9:59 | 1 | 65 | 0:39 | UVA | Dontayvion Wicks 70-yard touchdown reception from Brennan Armstrong, Brendan Farrell kick good | 21 | 28 |
| 2 | 7:27 | 8 | 60 | 2:32 | BYU | 32-yard field goal by Jake Oldroyd | 21 | 31 |
| 2 | 5:53 | 3 | 75 | 1:34 | UVA | Devin Darrington 49-yard touchdown run, Brendan Farrell kick good | 28 | 31 |
| 2 | 1:59 | 4 | 77 | 1:46 | UVA | Brennan Armstrong 30-yard touchdown run, Brendan Farrell kick good | 35 | 31 |
| 2 | 1:27 | 3 | 75 | 0:32 | BYU | Samson Nacua 40-yard touchdown reception from Jaren Hall, Jake Oldroyd kick good | 35 | 38 |
| 2 | 0:22 | 6 | 75 | 1:05 | UVA | Billy Kemp 12-yard touchdown reception from Brennan Armstrong, Brendan Farrell kick good | 42 | 38 |
| 3 | 11:16 | 4 | 75 | 1:52 | BYU | Tyler Allgeier 49-yard touchdown run, Jake Oldroyd kick good | 42 | 45 |
| 3 | 2:10 | 9 | 80 | 4:46 | UVA | Brennan Armstrong 2-yard touchdown reception from Brennan Armstrong, Brendan Farrell kick good | 49 | 45 |
| 4 | 14:49 | 8 | 65 | 2:21 | BYU | Neil Pau'u 10-yard touchdown reception from Jaren Hall, Jake Oldroyd kick good | 49 | 52 |
| 4 | 14:22 | 2 | 31 | 0:16 | BYU | Tyler Allgeier 31-yard touchdown run, Jake Oldroyd kick good | 49 | 59 |
| 4 | 7:12 | 7 | 65 | 3:28 | BYU | Tyler Allgeier 4-yard touchdown run, Jake Oldroyd kick good | 49 | 66 |
| "TOP" = time of possession. For other American football terms, see Glossary of American football. | | | | | | | 49 | 66 |

| Statistics | UVA | BYU |
|---|---|---|
| First downs | 28 | 36 |
| Plays–yards | 64–588 | 83–734 |
| Rushes–yards | 25–216, 3 TD's | 46–385, 6 TD's |
| Passing yards | 372 | 349 |
| Passing: comp–att–int | 24–39–2, 4 TD's | 22–37–0, 3 TD's |
| Turnovers | | |
| Time of possession | 25:58 | 34:02 |

| Team | Category | Player | Statistics |
|---|---|---|---|
| UVA | Passing | Brennan Armstrong | 21–33–2, 329 yards, 4 TD's |
| UVA | Rushing | Brennan Armstrong | 11 carries, 94 yards, 2 TD's |
| UVA | Receiving | Dontayvion Wicks | 4 receptions, 125 yards, 1 TD |
| BYU | Passing | Jaren Hall | 22–37–0, 349 yards, 3 TD's |
| BYU | Rushing | Tyler Allgeier | 29 carries, 266 yards, 5 TD's |
| BYU | Receiving | Samson & Puka Nacua | 3 and 8 receptions, both 107 yards, both 1 TD |

=== Senior Day: Idaho State ===
Idaho State at BYU

| Team | 1 | 2 | 3 | 4 | Total |
|---|---|---|---|---|---|
| Bengals | 0 | 7 | 7 | 0 | 14 |
| • No. 17/20/15 Cougars | 21 | 21 | 7 | 10 | 59 |

- Date: November 6
- Location: LaVell Edwards Stadium
  Provo, Utah
- Game start: 1:36 p.m. MDT
- Elapsed time: 3:08
- Game attendance: 63,470
- Game weather: 68 °F (20 °C), Winds SE 10 mph; Sunny & Overcast
- Referee: Kevin Mar • Umpire: Marlow Fitzgerald • Linesman: Greg Downum • Line judge: Scott Reilly • Back judge: Lyndon Nixon • Field judge: Randy Smith • Side judge: Jim Murphy • Center judge: Darren Winkley
- TV announcers (BYUtv): Dave McCann, Blaine Fowler, and Jarom Jordan

Uniform combination: navy helmets, navy jersey w/ white stripes, white pants w/ navy accents

Scoring summary

| Quarter | Time | Drive | | | Team | Scoring information | Score | |
| Quarter | Time | Plays | Yards | TOP | Team | Scoring information | ISU | BYU |
|---|---|---|---|---|---|---|---|---|
| 1 | 9:38 | 9 | 55 | 3:48 | BYU | Tyler Allgeier 11-yard touchdown run, Jake Oldroyd kick good | 0 | 7 |
| 1 | 6:03 | 5 | 79 | 2:00 | BYU | Lopini Katoa 2-yard touchdown reception from Jaren Hall, Jake Oldroyd kick good | 0 | 14 |
| 1 | 5:23 | 3 | 6 | 0:33 | BYU | Jaren Hall 1-yard touchdown run, Jake Oldroyd kick good | 0 | 21 |
| 2 | 13:29 | 13 | 73 | 5:10 | BYU | Keanu Hill 13-yard touchdown reception from Jaren Hall, Jake Oldroyd kick good | 0 | 28 |
| 2 | 7:33 | 6 | 92 | 2:39 | BYU | Puka Nacua 23-yard touchdown reception from Jaren Hall, Jake Oldroyd kick good | 0 | 35 |
| 2 | 1:20 | 3 | 17 | 1:06 | ISU | Jared Scott 6-yard touchdown reception from Sagan Gronauer, Jake Oldroyd kick good | 7 | 35 |
| 2 | 0:15 | 6 | 75 | 1:05 | BYU | Neil Pau'u 13-yard touchdown reception from Jaren Hall, Jake Oldroyd kick good | 7 | 42 |
| 3 | 3:46 | 6 | 76 | 2:20 | BYU | Dallin Holker 17-yard touchdown reception from Baylor Romney, Justen Smith kick good | 7 | 49 |
| 3 | 3:23 | 1 | 7 | 0:03 | ISU | Tyevin Ford 7-yard touchdown run, David Allish kick good | 14 | 49 |
| 4 | 10:49 | 6 | 30 | 1:15 | BYU | 39-yard field goal by Justen Smith | 14 | 52 |
| 4 | 4:18 | | | | BYU | Kevin Ryan punt blocked, recovered by Keanu Hill in the end zone for BYU TD, Justen Smith kick good | 14 | 59 |
| "TOP" = time of possession. For other American football terms, see Glossary of American football. | | | | | | | 14 | 59 |

| Statistics | ISU | BYU |
|---|---|---|
| First downs | 10 | 28 |
| Plays–yards | 59–238 | 76–560 |
| Rushes–yards | 30–71, 1 TD | 38–173, 2 TD's |
| Passing yards | 167 | 387 |
| Passing: comp–att–int | 15–29–2, 1 TD | 25–38–0, 5 TD's |
| Turnovers | | |
| Time of possession | 28:22 | 31:38 |

| Team | Category | Player | Statistics |
|---|---|---|---|
| ISU | Passing | Sagan Gronauer | 15–27–1, 167 yards, 1 TD |
| ISU | Rushing | Tyevin Ford | 13 carries, 47 yards, 1 TD |
| ISU | Receiving | Tanner Conner | 4 receptions, 81 yards |
| BYU | Passing | Jaren Hall | 20–25–0, 298 yards, 4 TD's |
| BYU | Rushing | Jackson McChesney | 10 carries, 43 yards |
| BYU | Receiving | Puka Nacua | 6 receptions, 120 yards, 1 TD |

=== Georgia Southern ===
BYU at Georgia Southern

| Team | 1 | 2 | 3 | 4 | Total |
|---|---|---|---|---|---|
| • No. 14/15/14 Cougars | 7 | 13 | 7 | 7 | 34 |
| Eagles | 3 | 14 | 0 | 0 | 17 |

- Date: November 20
- Location: Paulson Stadium
  Statesboro, Georgia
- Game start: 4:05 p.m. EST
- Elapsed time: 3:05
- Game attendance: 20,862
- Game weather: Sunny & Windy
- Referee: William Bonet • Umpire: Ryan Aulds • Linesman: Mike Boles • Line judge: Chris Snuggs • Back judge: Brett Toney • Field judge: Brandon Harris • Side judge: Keythric Merriweather • Center judge: Nathan Jastram
- TV announcers (ESPN+): Danny Waugh and Amy Zimmer

Uniform combination: royal helmets, white jersey w/ royal stripes, white pants w/ royal accents

Scoring summary

| Quarter | Time | Drive | | | Team | Scoring information | Score | |
| Quarter | Time | Plays | Yards | TOP | Team | Scoring information | BYU | GSU |
|---|---|---|---|---|---|---|---|---|
| 1 | 7:14 | 13 | 54 | 7:56 | GSU | 39-yard field goal by Alex Raynor | 0 | 3 |
| 1 | 3:15 | 12 | 84 | 3:58 | BYU | Lopini Katoa 5-yard touchdown reception from Jaren Hall, Jake Oldroyd kick good | 7 | 3 |
| 2 | 14:56 | 4 | 75 | 1:25 | BYU | Puka Nacua 5-yard touchdown reception from Jaren Hall, Jake Oldroyd kick good | 14 | 3 |
| 2 | 10:17 | 8 | 72 | 4:34 | GSU | Logan Wright 3-yard touchdown run, Alex Raynor kick good | 14 | 10 |
| 2 | 6:25 | 4 | 57 | 2:07 | GSU | Logan Wright 11-yard touchdown run, Alex Raynor kick good | 14 | 17 |
| 2 | 4:56 | 5 | 53 | 1:29 | BYU | 39-yard field goal by Jake Oldroyd | 17 | 17 |
| 2 | 0:46 | 5 | 43 | 1:54 | BYU | 38-yard field goal by Jake Oldroyd | 20 | 17 |
| 3 | 10:03 | 10 | 78 | 4:39 | BYU | Tyler Allgeier 1-yard touchdown run, Jake Oldroyd kick good | 27 | 17 |
| 4 | 10:38 | 6 | 75 | 3:01 | BYU | Puka Nacua 29-yard touchdown reception from Jaren Hall, Jake Oldroyd kick good | 34 | 17 |
| "TOP" = time of possession. For other American football terms, see Glossary of American football. | | | | | | | 34 | 17 |

| Statistics | BYU | GSU |
|---|---|---|
| First downs | 26 | 19 |
| Plays–yards | 68–510 | 52–268 |
| Rushes–yards | 39–198, 2 TD's | 37–146, 2 TD's |
| Passing yards | 312 | 122 |
| Passing: comp–att–int | 17–29–0, 2 TD's | 11–15–2 |
| Turnovers | | |
| Time of possession | 31:09 | 28:51 |

| Team | Category | Player | Statistics |
|---|---|---|---|
| BYU | Passing | Jaren Hall | 17–29–0, 312 yards, 2 TD's |
| BYU | Rushing | Tyler Allgeier | 25 carries, 136 yards, 1 TD |
| BYU | Receiving | Gunner Romney | 5 receptions, 87 yards |
| GSU | Passing | Connor Cigelske | 11–14–1, 122 yards |
| GSU | Rushing | Logan Wright | 14 carries, 50 yards, 2 TD's |
| GSU | Receiving | Logan Wright | 5 receptions, 43 yards |

=== USC ===
BYU at USC

| Team | 1 | 2 | 3 | 4 | Total |
|---|---|---|---|---|---|
| • No. 13/15/13 Cougars | 7 | 14 | 7 | 7 | 35 |
| Trojans | 3 | 10 | 10 | 8 | 31 |

- Date: November 27
- Location: Los Angeles Memorial Coliseum
  Los Angeles, California
- Game start: 7:36 p.m. PST
- Elapsed time: 3:34
- Game attendance: 55,926
- Game weather: 58 °F (14 °C), Winds W 1 mph; Sunny
- Referee: Mark Duddy • Umpire: Mark Warner • Linesman: Harold Mitchell • Line judge: Tim Messuri • Back judge: David Ross • Field judge: Kevin Kieser • Side judge: Shane Anderson • Center judge: Christopher Wiggins
- TV announcers (ESPN): Dave Flemming, Rod Gilmore, and Stormy Buonantony

Uniform combination: royal helmets, white jersey w/ royal stripes, royal pants w/ white accents

Scoring summary

| Quarter | Time | Drive | | | Team | Scoring information | Score | |
| Quarter | Time | Plays | Yards | TOP | Team | Scoring information | BYU | USC |
|---|---|---|---|---|---|---|---|---|
| 1 | 11:20 | 8 | 25 | 3:31 | USC | 26-yard field goal by Parker Lewis | 0 | 3 |
| 1 | 7:24 | 8 | 70 | 3:56 | BYU | Puka Nacua 28-yard touchdown reception from Jaren Hall, Jake Oldroyd kick good | 7 | 3 |
| 2 | 11:34 | 15 | 93 | 6:36 | BYU | Tyler Allgeier 9-yard touchdown run, Jake Oldroyd kick good | 14 | 3 |
| 2 | 8:09 | 9 | 72 | 3:17 | USC | Jaxson Dart 6-yard touchdown run, Parker Lewis kick good | 14 | 10 |
| 2 | 5:45 | 6 | 83 | 2:24 | BYU | Tyler Allgeier 5-yard touchdown run, Jake Oldroyd kick good | 21 | 10 |
| 2 | 0:00 | 8 | 54 | 1:04 | USC | 33-yard field goal by Parker Lewis | 21 | 13 |
| 3 | 11:37 | 6 | 75 | 3:23 | BYU | Keanu Hill 41-yard touchdown reception from Jaren Hall, Jake Oldroyd kick good | 28 | 13 |
| 3 | 7:12 | 14 | 75 | 4:25 | USC | Vavae Malepeai 5-yard touchdown run, Parker Lewis kick good | 28 | 20 |
| 3 | 3:45 | 5 | 38 | 1:36 | USC | 36-yard field goal by Parker Lewis | 28 | 23 |
| 4 | 11:03 | 12 | 91 | 5:07 | USC | Gary Bryant Jr. 28-yard touchdown reception from Jaxson Dart, 2-point Jaxson Dart pass to Lake McRee good | 28 | 31 |
| 4 | 3:57 | 6 | 62 | 2:22 | BYU | Jackson McChesney 7-yard touchdown run, Jake Oldroyd kick good | 35 | 31 |
| "TOP" = time of possession. For other American football terms, see Glossary of American football. | | | | | | | 35 | 31 |

| Statistics | BYU | USC |
|---|---|---|
| First downs | 27 | 26 |
| Plays–yards | 74–465 | 80–458 |
| Rushes–yards | 42–189, 3 TD's | 44–210, 2 TD's |
| Passing yards | 276 | 248 |
| Passing: comp–att–int | 20–32–2, 2 TD's | 23–36–0, 1 TD |
| Turnovers | | |
| Time of possession | 29:09 | 30:51 |

| Team | Category | Player | Statistics |
|---|---|---|---|
| BYU | Passing | Jaren Hall | 20–32–2, 276 yards, 2 TD's |
| BYU | Rushing | Tyler Allgeier | 21 carries, 111 yards, 2 TD's |
| BYU | Receiving | Keanu Hill | 4 receptions, 72 yards, 1 TD |
| USC | Passing | Jaxson Dart | 23–35–0, 248 yards, 1 TD |
| USC | Rushing | Vavae Malepeai | 20 carries, 99 yards, 1 TD |
| USC | Receiving | Lake McRee | 4 receptions, 63 yards |

=== Independence Bowl: UAB ===
Independence Bowl: BYU vs. UAB

| Team | 1 | 2 | 3 | 4 | Total |
|---|---|---|---|---|---|
| • Blazers | 14 | 7 | 3 | 7 | 31 |
| No. 12/14/13 Cougars | 0 | 14 | 7 | 7 | 28 |

- Date: December 18
- Location: Independence Stadium
  Shreveport, Louisiana
- Game start: 2:42 p.m. CST
- Elapsed time: 3:11
- Game attendance: 26,276
- Game weather: 58 °F (14 °C), Winds N 10 mph; Rainy
- Referee: Luke Richmond • Umpire: Michael Prowell • Linesman: Adam Loudin • Line judge: Lance Thompson • Back judge: Chris Bikowski • Field judge: Glenn Crowther • Side judge: Jerry Walter • Center judge: Patrick Oldham
- TV announcers (ABC/Bowl Season Radio): Roy Philpott, Cole Cubelic, and Paul Carcaterra (ABC)
  J.D. Byars, Hans Olsen, and Chris Mycoskie (Bowl Season Radio)

Uniform combination: navy helmets, navy jersey w/ white stripes, white pants w/ navy accents

Scoring summary

| Quarter | Time | Drive | | | Team | Scoring information | Score | |
| Quarter | Time | Plays | Yards | TOP | Team | Scoring information | UAB | BYU |
|---|---|---|---|---|---|---|---|---|
| 1 | 6:26 | 8 | 60 | 4:26 | UAB | Gerrit Prince 10-yard touchdown reception from Dylan Hopkins, Matthew Quinn kick good | 7 | 0 |
| 1 | 1:02 | 2 | 67 | 0:48 | UAB | DeWayne McBride 64-yard touchdown run, Matthew Quinn kick good | 14 | 0 |
| 2 | 12:48 | 8 | 72 | 3:09 | BYU | Tyler Allgeier 1-yard touchdown run, Jake Oldroyd kick good | 14 | 7 |
| 2 | 8:19 | 5 | 50 | 2:18 | BYU | Samson Nacua 2-yard touchdown run, Jake Oldroyd kick good | 14 | 14 |
| 2 | 3:18 | 9 | 78 | 5:00 | UAB | Gerrit Prince 23-yard touchdown reception from Dylan Hopkins, Matthew Quinn kick good | 21 | 14 |
| 3 | 13:43 | 3 | 75 | 1:17 | BYU | Tyler Allgeier 62-yard touchdown run, Jake Oldroyd kick good | 21 | 21 |
| 3 | 7:27 | 11 | 54 | 6:16 | UAB | 38-yard field goal by Matthew Quinn | 24 | 21 |
| 4 | 14:33 | 8 | 52 | 2:53 | BYU | Tyler Allgeier 1-yard touchdown run, Jake Oldroyd kick good | 24 | 28 |
| 4 | 6:17 | 15 | 75 | 8:16 | UAB | Trea Shropshire 14-yard touchdown reception from Dylan Hopkins, Matthew Quinn kick good | 31 | 28 |
| "TOP" = time of possession. For other American football terms, see Glossary of American football. | | | | | | | 31 | 28 |

| Statistics | UAB | BYU |
|---|---|---|
| First downs | 23 | 18 |
| Plays–yards | 66–412 | 58–394 |
| Rushes–yards | 43–223, 1 TD | 35–199, 4 TD's |
| Passing yards | 189 | 195 |
| Passing: comp–att–int | 19–23–1, 3 TD's | 15–23–0 |
| Turnovers | | |
| Time of possession | 35:27 | 24:33 |

| Team | Category | Player | Statistics |
|---|---|---|---|
| UAB | Passing | Dylan Hopkins | 19–23–1, 189 yards, 3 TD's |
| UAB | Rushing | DeWayne McBride | 28 carries, 183 yards, 1 TD |
| UAB | Receiving | Ryan Davis | 3 receptions, 50 yards |
| BYU | Passing | Baylor Romney | 15–23–0, 193 yards |
| BYU | Rushing | Tyler Allgeier | 27 carries, 192 yards, 3 TD's |
| BYU | Receiving | Gunner Romney & Masen Wake | Both 3 receptions, 55 yards |
