= Kalani Sitake =

Tongan-American football coach (born 1975)

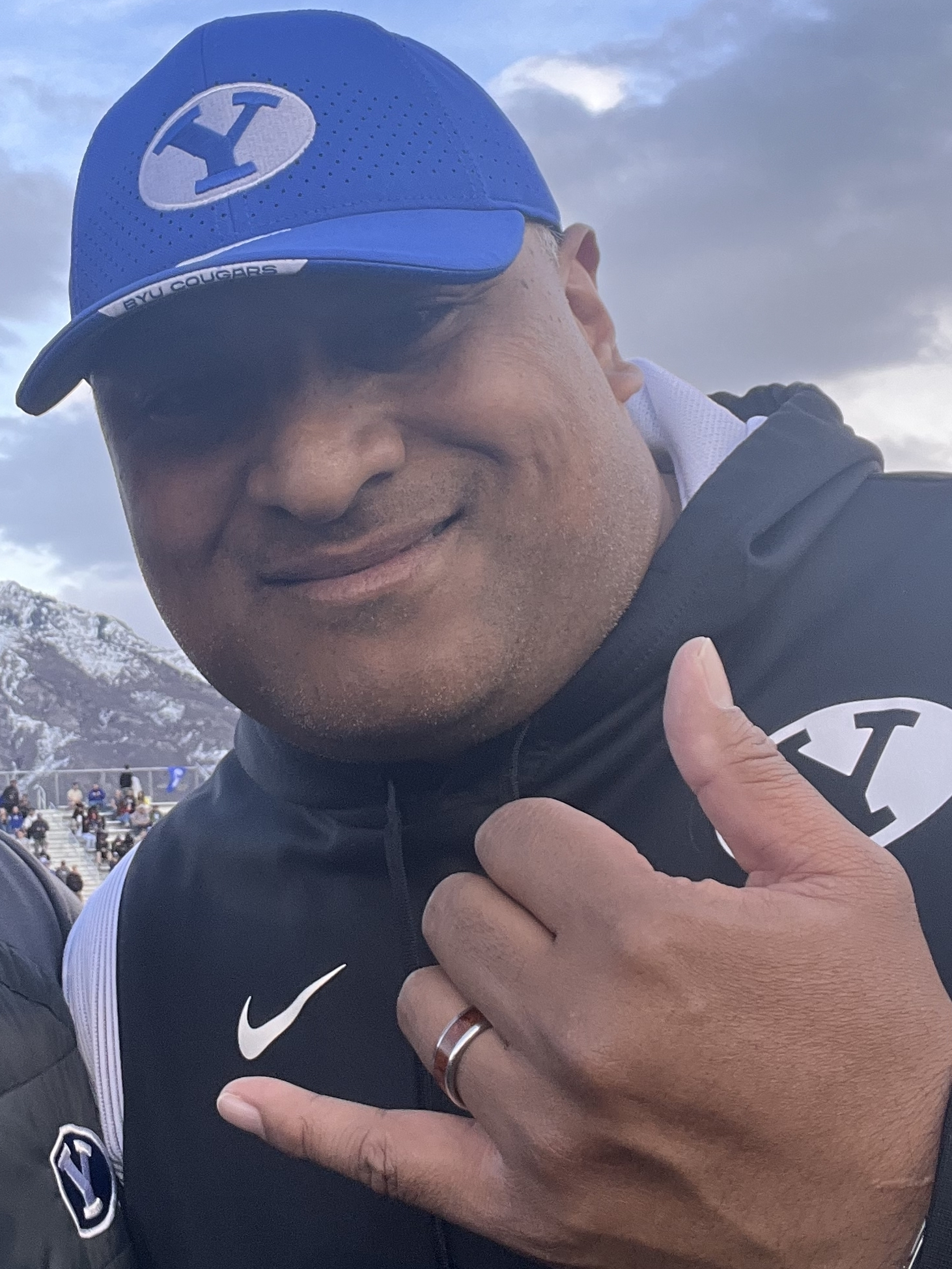
- Sitake in 2024

Current position
- Title: Head coach
- Team: BYU
- Conference: Big 12
- Record: 93–47 (.664)

Biographical details
- Born: October 10, 1975 (age 51); Nukuʻalofa, Tonga

Playing career
- 1994, 1997–2000: BYU
- 2001: Cincinnati Bengals*
- Position: Fullback

Coaching career (HC unless noted)
- 2001: Eastern Arizona (DB/ST)
- 2002: BYU (GA)
- 2003: Southern Utah (RB/FB/TE)
- 2004: Southern Utah (OL/FB/TE)
- 2005–2008: Utah (LB)
- 2009–2011: Utah (DC/LB)
- 2012–2014: Utah (AHC/DC/LB)
- 2015: Oregon State (AHC/DC)
- 2016–present: BYU

Head coaching record
- Overall: 93–47 (.664)
- Bowls: 6–2 (.750)

Accomplishments and honors

Awards
- Big 12 Coach of the Year (2025); Polynesian Football Hall of Fame (2025); Buddy Teevens Award (2025)

Kelaokalani Fifita "Kalani" 'Sitake (born October 10, 1975) is a Tongan–American football coach and former player who is the head football coach at Brigham Young University.

Sitake played college football as a fullback for BYU under coach LaVell Edwards, graduating in 2000. He played professionally briefly in the National Football League before suffering a career-ending injury. As a coach, Sitake has held assistant coaching positions at BYU, Utah, Oregon State, EAC, and SUU. In 2016, he became the head coach for BYU, where he has (as of the end of the 2025) led the Cougars to four 10-win seasons. His .648 win record places him among the top 20 active FBS coaches in total victories. He is the first Tongan to become a collegiate football head coach, and he was inducted into the Polynesian Football Hall of Fame in 2025.

== Early life ==
Sitake was born in Tonga. His family immigrated to the United States when he was a child, living in Lāʻie, Hawaii. He went to high school in Kirkwood, Missouri.

== College career ==
Sitake began his BYU playing career in 1994 prior to serving a two-year mission for the Church of Jesus Christ of Latter-day Saints (LDS Church) in Oakland, California. After returning and redshirting in 1997, Sitake was a three-year starter at fullback for BYU from 1998 to 2000 under hall of fame coach LaVell Edwards. He was named BYU's Football Scholar Athlete of the Year in 1998, helped BYU to the first Mountain West Conference championship in 1999, and earned BYU's Impact Player of the Year in 1999. In 2000, Sitake was named team captain and BYU's most valuable running back. He completed his career amassing 373 yards rushing on 86 carries (4.3 yards per carry), and 536 yards receiving on 62 receptions for one touchdown. Sitake earned a B.A. degree in English from BYU in 2001.

== Professional career ==
Following his collegiate career, Sitake signed a free agent contract with the Cincinnati Bengals in 2001. His career ended due to a back injury.

== Coaching career ==
=== Assistant coaching roles ===
Sitake began his coaching career in 2001 when he worked as the defensive backs coach and special teams coordinator at Eastern Arizona College. In 2002, he returned to his alma mater, BYU, as a graduate assistant for the defense. From 2003 to 2004, he coached at Southern Utah, coaching the running backs and tight ends in 2003 and the offensive line and tight ends in 2004.

In 2005, Sitake was hired at Utah, where he began as linebackers coach. He was promoted to defensive coordinator on December 7, 2008, replacing Gary Andersen, and began his formal duties on January 3, 2009. Sitake became the first native Tongan named as a defensive coordinator at an NCAA FBS team.

On December 23, 2014, Oregon State announced that head coach Gary Andersen had hired Sitake as defensive coordinator and assistant head coach. Sitake had previously worked under Andersen while at Utah.

=== Head coach at BYU ===
On December 19, 2015, after Bronco Mendenhall left BYU to become the head coach of Virginia, Sitake was hired as BYU's head football coach. He is the fifteenth head football coach in BYU history.

Sitake's first game as a head coach was September 3, 2016 against Arizona at University of Phoenix Stadium in Glendale, Arizona. BYU won 18–16, giving Sitake his first win as a head coach. BYU then lost three games in a row, for a 1–3 start before winning four games in a row, including a road victory at Michigan State and a homecoming overtime win against Mississippi State. BYU finished the regular season at 8–4 and were invited to play in the Poinsettia Bowl, where they defeated Wyoming 24–21. BYU finished 2016 with a 9–4 record.

In 2017, BYU took a major step back, starting the season 1–7 before finishing with a record of 4–9. It was BYU's first season not becoming bowl eligible since 2004. After the season, Sitake fired offensive coordinator Ty Detmer and hired Jeff Grimes in his place.

In 2018, BYU improved upon the previous season. On September 15, 2018, BYU achieved a major upset by defeating #6 Wisconsin on the road, 24–21. After a 3–3 start, Sitake benched quarterback Tanner Mangum and began starting freshman Zach Wilson in his place. BYU closed the regular season with a loss at Utah, which was Sitake's third straight loss to the Utes. BYU finished the regular season with a 6–6 record, becoming bowl eligible after being ineligible the previous season. They were invited to the Famous Idaho Potato Bowl, where they defeated Western Michigan 49–18, finishing the season with a 7–6 record.

Sitake's fourth season continued to build on the previous year. The Cougars opened the season with a 30–12 loss to Utah, Sitake's fourth in four seasons. However, the loss was immediately followed by wins at Tennessee and against #24 USC. Starting quarterback Zach Wilson missed five games due to a broken thumb and was replaced by backups Jaren Hall and Baylor Romney. After the initial success, BYU regressed and finished the regular season with a 7–5 record. Before the end of the regular season, Sitake received an extension from BYU through the 2023 season. BYU received an invitation to the Hawaii Bowl, where they lost to Hawaii, 34–38. It was Sitake's first bowl game loss of his career. The Cougars finished the 2019 season with a record of 7–6.

BYU's 2020 schedule was heavily modified from its original plan due to the COVID-19 pandemic. Nearly all of BYU's originally scheduled opponents either canceled their seasons (most would later play a shortened season) or changed to a conference-only schedule. As a result, BYU's entire new schedule consisted of teams from the Group of Five and one game against FCS North Alabama. Five games were played with no fans in attendance, with the remaining seven games having limited attendance. BYU was one of few teams who played a game in the first week of the season, when they traveled to Navy, dominating the game and winning 55–3. BYU would go on to a 9–0 start, the best of Sitake's career up to that point, including a road win against #21 Boise State. The Cougars were ranked as high as #8 in the AP poll, which was also the best ranking of Sitake's career to that point. With no opponent scheduled the week of December 5, BYU agreed to a last-minute game at #18 Coastal Carolina, who was also 9–0. BYU came up just short, losing 17–22. The Cougars would win their final regular season game against San Diego State to finish the regular season with a 10–1 record. They were invited to play in the Boca Raton Bowl, where they defeated UCF 49–23 to finish with an 11–1 record, the best record of Sitake's career, and finished ranked #11 in the AP poll, which is tied for the highest end-of-season ranking of Sitake's career.

Prior to the 2021 season, Sitake promoted Aaron Roderick to be BYU's offensive coordinator, replacing Jeff Grimes, who had accepted a position at Baylor. On September 10, 2021, the Big 12 Conference announced that it had extended an invitation to BYU for all conference sports, effective July 2023. The next day, BYU defeated #21 Utah 26–17, the first win by BYU over Utah since 2009 and the first of Sitake's career, breaking a nine-game losing streak to the Utes. The next week, BYU defeated #19 Arizona State, 27–17. The Cougars would reach 5–0 and a #10 ranking in the AP poll before losing at home to Boise State, 17–26. BYU lost at Baylor the following week, 24–38, before winning five consecutive games to finish the regular season 10–2 and ranked #13 in the College Football Playoff rankings. They received an invitation to the Independence Bowl, where they lost to UAB, 28–31. BYU finished 2021 with a record of 10–3 and was ranked #19 in the final AP Poll.

Prior to the 2022 season, BYU was ranked #25 in the AP poll, the first time BYU received a preseason ranking in Sitake's career. The season began with a dominant 50–21 win at South Florida before an upset win over #9 Baylor at home, 26–20 in double overtime. BYU rose to #12 in the AP poll before losing at #25 Oregon, 20–41, which dropped the Cougars to #19. After consecutive home wins against Wyoming and Utah State, BYU rose to #16 in the AP poll before losing to Notre Dame 20–28 in a neutral site game at Allegiant Stadium in Las Vegas. After the loss, BYU was not ranked again for the rest of the season. The Cougars lost their next three games before winning three straight to end the regular season with a 7–5 record. After the regular season, Sitake's defensive coordinator, Ilaisa Tuiaki, resigned from his position. The Cougars received an invitation to play in the New Mexico Bowl. With starting quarterback Jaren Hall injured, Sitake started Sol-Jay Maiava-Peters at quarterback. The Cougars would defeat SMU 24–23, stopping a two-point conversion attempt at the end of the game to win. BYU finished the season with an 8–5 record. It was BYU's last season as an independent school.

On July 1, 2023, BYU officially joined the Big 12 Conference in all conference sports, including football. Prior to the 2023 season, Sitake hired Jay Hill as BYU's new defensive coordinator. BYU opened the season with wins against Sam Houston and Southern Utah, then won on the road against Arkansas, 38–31. The Cougars lost their first-ever conference game as a member of the Big 12, 27–38 at Kansas. The following week, they won their first-ever Big 12 home game, 35–27 against Cincinnati. After a bye week, BYU lost at TCU, 11–44, then returned home to defeat Texas Tech, 27–14. After starting 5–2, BYU ended the season on a seven-game losing streak, concluding with a 34–40 loss to Oklahoma State in double overtime. The Cougars ended with a record of 5–7 overall and were ineligible for a bowl game for the first time since 2017 and the second time in Sitake's career. BYU finished 2–7 in the Big 12 and tied for eleventh place in the conference.

Entering the 2024 season, Sitake named Jake Retzlaff the starting quarterback over Gerry Bohanon, a transfer into the program from South Florida. Retzlaff had finished 2023 as the starting quarterback, replacing an injured Kedon Slovis. BYU went undefeated in non-conference play with wins over Southern Illinois, at SMU, and at Wyoming. Sitake then coached the Cougars to an upset win over #13 Kansas State. After the 4–0 start, the Cougars were ranked #22 in the AP poll. BYU then defeated Baylor on the road and Arizona at home to start 6–0 and become bowl eligible after being ineligible the previous season. On October 18, the Cougars defeated Oklahoma State 38–35 at home, via a game-winning touchdown pass from Retzlaff to Darius Lassiter with 10 seconds remaining in the game. At 7–0, the Cougars were ranked #11 in the AP poll. BYU then traveled to UCF, where they won 37–24. At 8–0, BYU was ranked #9 before facing Utah on the road. Sitake led the Cougars to a 22–21 win over Utah, his second straight win over the Utes and BYU's first on the road since 2006. The 9–0 start is tied for the best start in Sitake's career. BYU rose to #6 in the College Football Playoff rankings, the highest ranking in Sitake's career. BYU was then upset at home by Kansas, 13–17, for their first loss of the season. The Cougars then lost again on the road against Arizona State. BYU won its final regular season game at home against Houston to finish 10–2 overall with a 7–2 conference record. BYU finished in a four-way tie for first place in the Big 12 but did not qualify for the Big 12 Championship Game via tiebreakers. The Cougars were invited to the Alamo Bowl where they defeated fellow Big 12 team #23 Colorado to finish the season 11–2. BYU was ranked #13 in the final AP poll, the third time in Sitake's career finishing as a ranked team.

Before the 2025 season, Jake Retzlaff faced a seven-game suspension at BYU and transferred to Tulane. Sitake selected true freshman Bear Bachmeier as the starting quarterback. BYU again went 3–0 in non-conference play with wins over Portland State, Stanford, and at East Carolina. After the 3–0 start, the Cougars were ranked #25 in the AP poll. BYU then defeated Colorado on the road, 24–21, and West Virginia at home, 38–24. The Cougars reached #18 in the AP poll and traveled to Arizona, where they came from behind to win 33–27 in double overtime. BYU moved up to #15 before defeating #23 Utah at home, 24–21. It was Sitake's third straight win over Utah and BYU's longest winning streak over Utah since 1989–92. The Cougars moved up to #11 in the AP poll and then faced Iowa State on the road, where they won 41–27. BYU was ranked #7 in the first College Football Playoff rankings and on November 8, faced #8 Texas Tech on the road, where they lost, 7–29. The Cougars bounced back the next week with a 44–13 home win over TCU, followed by a 26–14 road win over Cincinnati. BYU won its final regular season game at home against UCF, 41–21. Sitake led the Cougars to a 11–1 record in the regular season with an 8–1 record in the Big 12. BYU tied for first place in the Big 12 and qualified for the Big 12 Championship Game in their third season in the conference. Ranked at #11 in the CFP rankings, BYU lost the Big 12 Championship to #4 Texas Tech, 7–34. BYU was ranked #12 in the final CFP rankings. The Cougars were invited to the Pop-Tarts Bowl, where they defeated #22 Georgia Tech, 25–21. BYU was ranked #11 in the final AP poll, tied for the highest end-of-season ranking of Sitake's career.

== Honors ==
Sitake was inducted into the Polynesian Football Hall of Fame on January 18, 2025 at the Polynesian Cultural Center in Lāʻie, Hawaii. He was named Big 12 Coach of the Year in 2025.

== Personal life ==
Sitake has a bachelor's degree in English from BYU. He is married to Timberly Friddle of Florida, whom he met while the two were students at BYU. They have four children. Sitake is a member of the Church of Jesus Christ of Latter-day Saints, BYU's sponsoring institution. He left college for two years to serve as a missionary for the church in Oakland, California, returning to BYU in 1997.

== Head coaching record ==
Year	Team	Overall	Conference	Standing	Bowl/playoffs	Coaches^{#}	AP^{°}
BYU Cougars (NCAA Division I FBS independent) (2016–2022)
2016	BYU	9–4			W Poinsettia		
2017	BYU	4–9					
2018	BYU	7–6			W Famous Idaho Potato		
2019	BYU	7–6			L Hawaii		
2020	BYU	11–1			W Boca Raton	11	11
2021	BYU	10–3			L Independence	22	19
2022	BYU	8–5			W New Mexico		
BYU Cougars (Big 12 Conference) (2023–present)
2023	BYU	5–7	2–7	T–11th			
2024	BYU	11–2	7–2	T–1st	W Alamo	14	13
2025	BYU	12–2	8–1	T–1st	W Pop-Tarts	12	11
2026	BYU	9–2	6–2				
BYU:		93–47	22–12				
Total:		93–47					
National championship Conference title Conference division title or championship game berth
^{#}Rankings from final Coaches Poll.; ^{°}Rankings from final AP Poll.
