= Tuiaki =

Tuiaki is a surname. Notable people with the surname include:

- Ilaisa Tuiaki (born 1978), American football coach
- Taniela Tuiaki (born 1982), New Zealand rugby league player
