= 2022 New Mexico Bowl =

Postseason college football bowl game

- 17th New Mexico Bowl
SMU Mustangs	BYU Cougars
(7–5)	(7–5)
The American	Independent
23	24
Head coach: Rhett Lashlee	Head coach: Kalani Sitake
	1	2	3	4	Total
SMU	10	0	0	13	23
BYU	7	3	14	0	24
- Date: December 17, 2022
- Season: 2022
- Stadium: University Stadium
- Location: Albuquerque, New Mexico
- MVP: Offense: Sol-Jay Maiava-Peters (QB, BYU); Defense: Ben Bywater (LB, BYU)
- Favorite: SMU by 4.5
- Referee: Ted Pitts (Sun Belt)
- Attendance: 22,209
- Payout: US$1,050,000

United States TV coverage
- Network: ABC
- Announcers: Tom Hart (play-by-play), Brock Osweiler (analyst), and Taylor McGregor (sideline)

International TV coverage
- Network: ESPN Deportes and ESPN Brazil
- Announcers: ESPN Deportes: Kenneth Garay (play-by-play) and Pablo Viruega (analyst); ESPN Brazil: Matheus Pinheiro (play-by-play) and Weinny Eirado (analyst)

The 2022 New Mexico Bowl was a college football bowl game played on December 17, 2022, at University Stadium in Albuquerque, New Mexico. The 17th annual New Mexico Bowl, the game featured the SMU Mustangs from the American Athletic Conference (The American) and the BYU Cougars, an FBS independent. The game began at 5:37 p.m. MST and aired on ABC; this time was switched with that of the Las Vegas Bowl due to an NFL scheduling decision. It was one of the 2022–23 bowl games concluding the 2022 FBS football season.

Both teams entered the game with momentum, as SMU concluded the regular season having won four of their final five games, and BYU finished with three consecutive victories of their own. Both teams entered with identical records, with seven wins and five losses. Both teams were missing several players due to injuries, draft opt-outs, and the NCAA transfer portal; these included SMU wide receiver Rashee Rice, who was nursing a toe injury and decided to begin draft preparations, and BYU linebacker Keenan Pili, who entered the transfer portal after the Cougars' regular season concluded.

== Teams ==
The game will feature the SMU Mustangs from the American Athletic Conference and the FBS independent BYU Cougars. This will be the fourth meeting between BYU and SMU; the Cougars have won all three previous meetings. The teams first met in the 1980 Holiday Bowl and thereafter met in 1996 and 1997 as members of the Western Athletic Conference.

The game will be BYU's 40th bowl game appearance; they will enter with an all-time bowl record of 16–22–1, dating back to the 1974 Fiesta Bowl. They have one prior New Mexico Bowl appearance, as they defeated UTEP in the game's 2010 edition by a score of 52–24. SMU will make their 18th bowl game appearance, with a prior record of 7–9–1 dating back to the 1925 Dixie Classic. This game will be their first appearance in the New Mexico Bowl.

=== SMU ===
The Mustangs, representing the American Athletic Conference, began Rhett Lashlee's first season as head coach with a rivalry game matchup at North Texas, which they won convincingly, 48–10. Their home opener was against FCS Lamar, which also resulted in a solid win for the Mustangs. Their final two non-conference games came against Power Five teams, with a road game at Maryland and a home game against TCU, both of which ended in losses for SMU. They opened AAC conference play with a Wednesday night away game at UCF, delayed from the prior Saturday by Hurricane Ian. The Mustangs fell to the Knights after allowing 31 unanswered points but recovered the next week for a home win against Navy to win the Gansz Trophy. SMU dropped their homecoming game the next week to Cincinnati by a margin of two points, but again rebounded well, with three straight conference victories to put them at 6–4 and eligible for a bowl game. The first was a road contest at Tulsa, followed by a record-breaking game against Houston which SMU won, 77–63. Their sixth win of the season and third in a row was an away game against South Florida. The Mustangs' final two games resulted in one loss and one win: the loss came first, at No. 21 Tulane by five touchdowns, and a three-point win against Memphis concluded the regular season. SMU accepted their bowl bid on December 4 and will enter the game with an overall record of 7–5 with a conference mark of 5–3.

The Mustangs will be without wide receiver Rashee Rice and offensive lineman Jaylon Thomas, who are out with toe and shoulder injuries, respectively, and began NFL draft preparations following the conclusion of the regular season.

=== BYU ===
The seventh season of the Kalani Sitake era at BYU began with a road matchup across the country, as the No. 25 Cougars traveled to face South Florida, and won by 29 points. They vaulted into the top 15 following a double overtime upset win over No. 9 Baylor in their home opener, but fell the following week in a road game at No. 25 Oregon by three touchdowns. They finished September with a pair of home contests against Mountain West Conference opponents, as the Cougars topped Wyoming by 13 points before taking down rivals Utah State by 12 points. Ranked sixteenth, BYU's next game was a neutral-site contest played at Allegiant Stadium against Notre Dame as part of their Shamrock Series, which BYU lost by eight points. This marked the start of a four-game losing streak for BYU as the Cougars dropped each of their next three games. First was their homecoming game against Arkansas, followed by a road game at Liberty, and finally a home game against East Carolina. Now 4–5, the Cougars turned the tides and finished the regular season with three consecutive victories, first against Boise State on the road by a field goal. After a bye week, the Cougars defeated FCS Utah Tech before rounding out their regular season with a nine-point win over Stanford. The Cougars accepted their bowl bid on December 4, and will enter the game with a 7–5 record.

This was BYU's final game as an FBS independent, as the Cougars are set to join the Big 12 Conference in 2023.

After suffering an ankle injury against Stanford, quarterback Jaren Hall had limited participation in practices leading up to the game but his participation in the bowl has not been ruled out. The Cougars were without linebacker Keenan Pili, who entered the NCAA transfer portal prior to the game, in addition to other players.

== Game summary ==
The game was originally scheduled for 12:30 p.m. MST on ESPN, but was moved back to allow the Las Vegas Bowl to begin at an earlier time. This was done because the NFL flexed the New England Patriots–Las Vegas Raiders game out of NBC Sunday Night Football, meaning the Raiders would have had less time to prepare Allegiant Stadium, which also hosts the Las Vegas Bowl, before their game the following afternoon. The game's new time and network was originally scheduled for the Las Vegas Bowl, and vice versa.

The game was officiated by a crew from the Sun Belt Conference, led by referee Ted Pitts and umpire Trenton Crawford.

2022 New Mexico Bowl

Quarter	1	2	3	4	Total
SMU	10	0	0	13	23
BYU	7	3	14	0	24

at University Stadium • Albuquerque, New Mexico

- Date: Saturday, December 17, 2022
- Game time: 5:30 p.m. MST
- Game weather: Clear • Temperature: 34 °F (1 °C) • Wind: 5 mph (8.0 km/h) southeast
- Game attendance: 22,209
- Referee: Ted Pitts
- TV announcers (ABC): Tom Hart (play-by-play), Brock Osweiler (analyst), and Taylor McGregor (sideline)
- Box score

Scoring summary

Quarter	Time	Drive			Team	Scoring information	Score	
Quarter	Time	Plays	Yards	TOP	Team	Scoring information	SMU	BYU
1	12:01	11	57	2:59	SMU	35-yard field goal by Collin Rogers	3	0
1	6:09	11	73	5:52	BYU	Sol-Jay Maiava-Peters 1-yard touchdown run, Jake Oldroyd kick good	3	7
1	2:16	12	75	3:53	SMU	Roderick Daniels Jr. 19-yard touchdown reception from Tanner Mordecai, Collin Rogers kick good	10	7
2	3:34	14	66	7:11	BYU	31-yard field goal by Jake Oldroyd	10	10
3	8:17				BYU	Interception returned 76 yards for touchdown by Ben Bywater, Jake Oldroyd kick good	10	17
3	1:21	9	82	5:43	BYU	Christopher Brooks 22-yard touchdown run, Jake Oldroyd kick good	10	24
4	12:39	11	75	3:42	SMU	Tyler Lavine 3-yard touchdown run, Collin Rogers kick good	17	24
4	0:08	14	88	2:53	SMU	Jordan Kerley 12-yard touchdown reception from Tanner Mordecai, 2-point run failed	23	24
"TOP" = time of possession. For other American football terms, see Glossary of American football.							23	24

== Statistics ==
Team statistical comparison
Statistic	SMU	BYU
First downs	28	16
First downs rushing	16	12
First downs passing	11	2
First downs penalty	1	2
Third down efficiency	10–18	5–12
Fourth down efficiency	2–3	2–2
Total plays–net yards	87–389	54–256
Rushing attempts–net yards	50–171	42–209
Yards per rush	3.4	5.0
Yards passing	218	47
Pass completions–attempts	27–37	7–12
Interceptions thrown	1	1
Punt returns–total yards	2–30	0–0
Kickoff returns–total yards	0–0	1–25
Punts–average yardage	4–42.3	4–58.8
Fumbles–lost	1–0	1–0
Penalties–yards	2–28	5–53
Time of possession	28:25	31:35

SMU statistics
Mustangs passing
	C–A	Yds	TD–INT
Tanner Mordecai	27–37	218	2–1
Mustangs rushing
	Car	Yds	TD
Tyler Lavine	23	91	1
Roderick Daniels Jr.	10	59	0
Camar Wheaton	10	37	0
Austin Upshaw	2	2	0
Tanner Mordecai	5	−18	0
Mustangs receiving
	Rec	Yds	TD
Moochie Dixon	6	60	0
Roderick Daniels Jr.	6	54	1
Jordan Kerley	6	50	1
Tyler Lavine	4	25	0
Austin Upshaw	2	18	0
RJ Maryland	1	6	0
Carter Campbell	1	4	0
Camar Wheaton	1	1	0

BYU statistics
Cougars passing
	C–A	Yds	TD–INT
Sol-Jay Maiava-Peters	7–12	47	0–1
Cougars rushing
	Car	Yds	TD
Sol-Jay Maiava-Peters	14	96	1
Christopher Brooks	19	88	1
Hinckley Ropati	5	29	0
Parker Kingston	1	2	0
TEAM	1	−2	0
Chase Roberts	2	−4	0
Cougars receiving
	Rec	Yds	TD
Isaac Rex	1	27	0
Brayden Cosper	3	12	0
Chase Roberts	1	6	0
Hinckley Ropati	2	2	0
