= 2021 Independence Bowl =

Postseason college football bowl game

2021 Radiance Technologies Independence Bowl
- 45th Independence Bowl
UAB Blazers	BYU Cougars
(8–4)	(10–2)
C–USA	Independent
31	28
Head coach: Bill Clark	Head coach: Kalani Sitake
	AP / Coaches / CFP; 12 / 14 / 13
	1	2	3	4	Total
UAB	14	7	3	7	31
BYU	0	14	7	7	28
- Date: December 18, 2021
- Season: 2021
- Stadium: Independence Stadium
- Location: Shreveport, Louisiana
- MVP: Off.: Tyler Allgeier (RB, BYU); Def.: Tyler Batty (DE, BYU)
- Favorite: BYU by 7
- Referee: Luke Richmond (AAC)
- Attendance: 26,276

United States TV coverage
- Network: ABC
- Announcers: Roy Philpott (play-by-play), Cole Cubelic (analyst), and Paul Carcaterra (sideline)

The 2021 Independence Bowl was a college football bowl game played on December 18, 2021, and televised on ABC. It was the 45th edition of the Independence Bowl (after the 2020 edition was cancelled due to the COVID-19 pandemic), and was one of the 2021–22 bowl games concluding the 2021 FBS football season. Sponsored by engineering services company Radiance Technologies, the game was officially known as the Radiance Technologies Independence Bowl.

With kickoff scheduled for 3:30 p.m. EST (2:30 p.m. local CST), the start of the game was delayed approximately 12 minutes due to local weather conditions.

== Teams ==
Consistent with conference tie-ins, the game was played between a Conference USA (C-USA) member, UAB, and BYU, an FBS independent.

This was the first matchup between UAB and BYU.

== Game summary ==
2021 Radiance Technologies Independence Bowl

Quarter	1	2	3	4	Total
UAB	14	7	3	7	31
No. 13 BYU	0	14	7	7	28

at Independence Stadium • Shreveport, Louisiana

- Date: Saturday, December 18, 2021
- Game time: 3:30 p.m. EST (2:30 p.m. local CST)
- Game weather: Rain • Temperature: 58 °F (14 °C) • Wind: N 10 mph
- Game attendance: 26,276
- Referee: Luke Richmond
- TV announcers (ABC): Roy Philpott (play-by-play), Cole Cubelic (analyst), and Paul Carcaterra (sideline)
- Box score

Scoring summary

Quarter	Time	Drive			Team	Scoring information	Score	
Quarter	Time	Plays	Yards	TOP	Team	Scoring information	UAB	BYU
1	6:26	8	60	4:26	UAB	Gerrit Prince 10-yard touchdown reception from Dylan Hopkins, Matt Quinn kick good	7	0
1	1:02	2	67	0:48	UAB	DeWayne McBride 64-yard touchdown run, Matt Quinn kick good	14	0
2	12:48	8	72	3:09	BYU	Tyler Allgeier 1-yard touchdown run, Jake Oldroyd kick good	14	7
2	8:19	5	50	2:18	BYU	Samson Nacua 2-yard touchdown run, Jake Oldroyd kick good	14	14
2	3:18	9	78	5:00	UAB	Gerrit Prince 23-yard touchdown reception from Dylan Hopkins, Matt Quinn kick good	21	14
3	13:43	3	75	1:17	BYU	Tyler Allgeier 62-yard touchdown run, Jake Oldroyd kick good	21	21
3	7:27	11	54	6:16	UAB	38-yard field goal by Matt Quinn	24	21
4	14:33	8	52	2:53	BYU	Tyler Allgeier 1-yard touchdown run, Jake Oldroyd kick good	24	28
4	6:17	15	75	8:16	UAB	Trea Shropshire 14-yard touchdown reception from Dylan Hopkins, Matt Quinn kick good	31	28
"TOP" = time of possession. For other American football terms, see Glossary of American football.							31	28

=== Statistics ===
Statistics	UAB	BYU
First downs	23	18
Plays–yards	66–412	58–394
Rushes–yards	43–223	35–199
Passing yards	189	195
Passing: comp–att–int	19–23–1	15–23–0
Time of possession	35:27	24:33

Team	Category	Player	Statistics
UAB	Passing	Dylan Hopkins	19/23, 189 yards, 3 TD, 1 INT
UAB	Rushing	DeWayne McBride	28 carries, 183 yards, 1 TD
UAB	Receiving	Ryan Davis	3 receptions, 50 yards
BYU	Passing	Baylor Romney	15/23, 195 yards
BYU	Rushing	Tyler Allgeier	27 carries, 192 yards, 3 TD
BYU	Receiving	Masen Wake; Gunner Romney	3 receptions, 55 yards 3 receptions, 55 yards
