= Maple Mountain High School =

- The Maple Mountain High School Logo

Location
- 51 North 2550 East; Spanish Fork, Utah, U.S. 84660; 40°06′35.784″N 111°36′53.139″W

Information
- School type: Public School
- Established: c.2009
- Status: Currently operational
- Locale: Rural: Fringe
- School district: Nebo School District
- NCES District ID: 4900630
- Superintendent: Rick Nielsen
- CEEB code: 450423
- NCES School ID: 490063001159
- Dean: Mike Larsen
- Principal: Shea Bradshaw
- Grades: 10 - 12
- Age: 15 to 18
- Enrollment: 1,837 (2023-2024)
- Student to teacher ratio: 27.05
- Schedule type: A/B
- Hours in school day: 6.5
- Colors: Maroon, Gold, Forest green
- Fight song: "Maroon and Gold"
- Mascot: Golden Eagle
- Rivals: Spanish Fork High School; Springville High School
- Communities served: Spanish Fork, Mapleton

Maple Mountain High School is a public high school in Spanish Fork, Utah, that serves the Spanish Fork and Mapleton areas.

== Organization ==
The school is managed by the Nebo School District. It educates over 1,600 students and enrolls upwards of 500 students in each grade. The school was founded in 2009.

== Athletics ==
Maple Mountain participates in sports sanctioned by the Utah High School Activities Association (UHSAA). The school competes in Region 7 of class 5A. The following sports are offered:

- Baseball (boys)
- Basketball (girls & boys)
- Cross Country (girls & boys)
- Football (boys)
- Marching Band
- Soccer (girls & boys)
- Softball (girls)
- Tennis (girls & boys)
- Track & Field (girls & boys)
- Volleyball (girls)
- Wrestling (co-ed)
- Swim (girls & boys)
- Lacrosse (girls & boys)

== School identity ==
Maple Mountain's school colors are maroon and gold with forest green highlights, and their mascot is the Golden Eagle.

== Notable alumni ==
- Jaren Hall (born 1998), American football player
- Dave Lundgreen, World Class DCI Drummer (Bluecoats, Mandarins)
