= Tyler Allgeier =

American football player (born 2000)

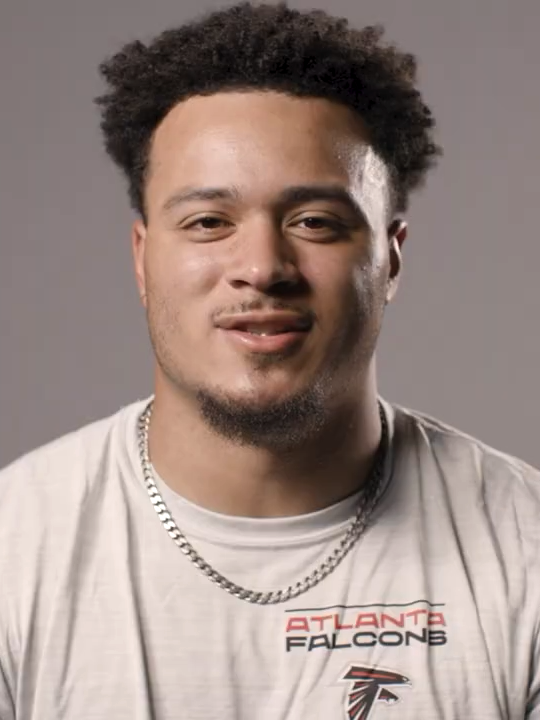
- Allgeier in 2022

No. 22 – Arizona Cardinals
- Position: Running back
- Roster status: Active

Personal information
- Born: April 15, 2000 (age 26); Fontana, California, U.S.
- Listed height: 5 ft 11 in (1.80 m)
- Listed weight: 225 lb (102 kg)

Career information
- High school: Henry J. Kaiser (Fontana)
- College: BYU (2018–2021)
- NFL draft: 2022: 5th round, 151st overall pick

Career history
- Atlanta Falcons (2022–2025); Arizona Cardinals (2026–present)

Awards and highlights
- PFWA All-Rookie Team (2022); Second-team All-American (2021); NCAA rushing touchdowns co-leader (2021); Independence Bowl MVP (2021)

Career NFL statistics as of Week 10, 2026
- Rushing yards: 3,259
- Rushing average: 4.2
- Rushing touchdowns: 20
- Receptions: 84
- Receiving yards: 644
- Receiving touchdowns: 3
- Stats at Pro Football Reference

Tyler Allgeier (/ˈældʒɪər/ AL-jeer; born April 15, 2000) is an American professional football running back for the Arizona Cardinals of the National Football League (NFL). He played college football for the BYU Cougars and was selected by the Atlanta Falcons in the fifth round of the 2022 NFL draft.

== Early life ==
Allgeier was born on April 15, 2000, in Fontana, California, to a mother of mixed White and Filipino descent through his maternal grandmother, a native of Southern Leyte, and a father of African American descent. He attended Henry J. Kaiser High School in Fontana, California. During his high school career he had a school record 5,000 rushing yards and 56 touchdowns. He committed to Brigham Young University (BYU) to play college football.

== College career ==
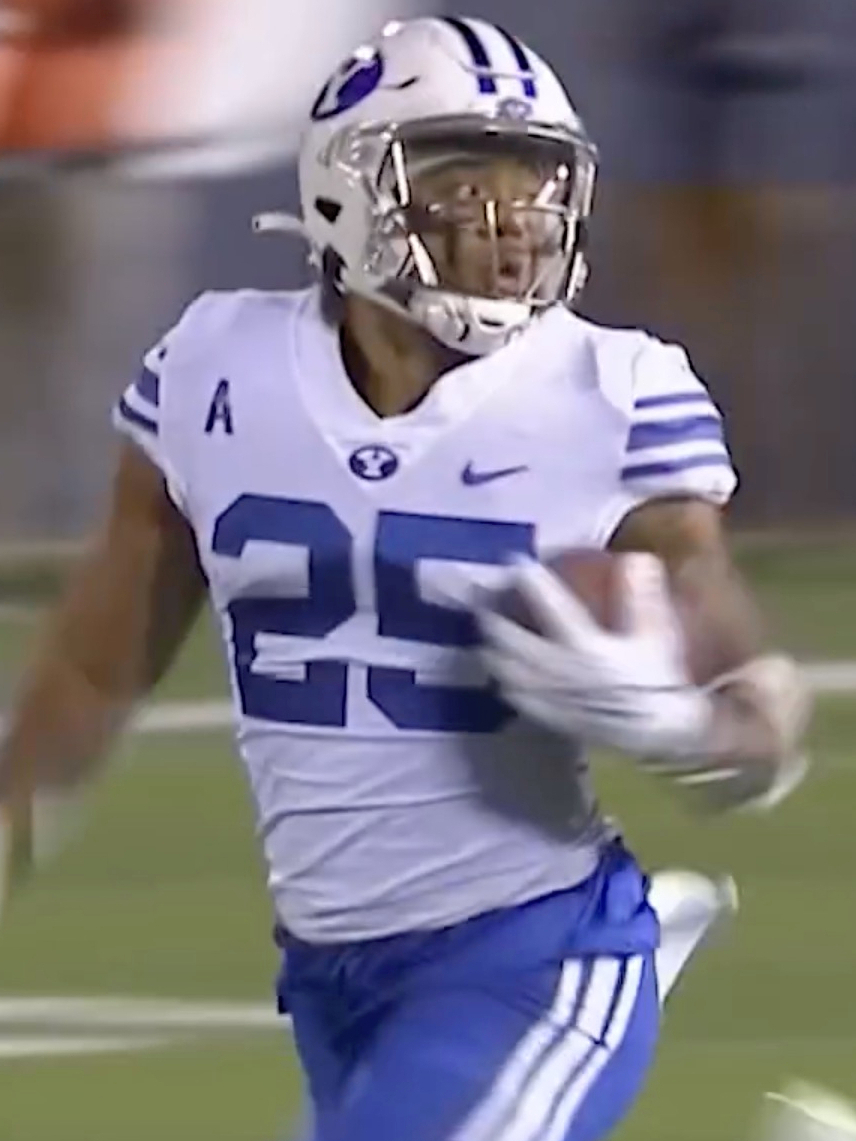
Allgeier with BYU in 2021

In his first year at BYU in 2018, Allgeier played in four games and had nine carries for 49 yards. In 2019 he moved from running back to linebacker. He played in all 13 games that season recording 26 tackles and 0.5 sacks on defense and 119 yards on 17 carries on offense. Allgeier moved back to running back in 2020 and played in all 11 games with eight starts. He finished the year with 1,130 rushing yards on 150 carries with 13 touchdowns. He returned as BYU's starting running back in 2021, finishing the year with 1,601 rushing yards on 276 attempts while co-leading the NCAA with 23 rushing touchdowns. On December 28, 2021, Allgeier announced that he would forgo his remaining two years of eligibility and enter the 2022 NFL draft.

=== College statistics ===
Legend
	Co-led the NCAA
**Bold**	Career high

Season	Team	GP	Rushing				Receiving			Tackles					Interceptions				Fumbles			
Season	Team	GP	Att	Yds	Avg	TD	Rec	Yds	TD	Cmb	Solo	Ast	TFL	Sck	Int	Yds	TD	PD	FF	FR	Yds	TD
2018	BYU	4	9	49	5.4	0	1	-3	0	0	0	0	0	0	0	0	0	0	0	0	0	0
2019	BYU	13	17	119	7.0	0	3	67	**1**	**26**	**19**	**7**	**1**	**0.5**	0	0	0	**1**	**1**	0	0	0
2020	BYU	11	150	1,130	**7.5**	13	14	174	0	0	0	0	0	0	0	0	0	0	0	0	0	0
2021	BYU	13	**276**	**1,601**	5.8	**23**	**28**	**199**	0	1	1	0	0	0	0	0	0	0	**1**	0	0	0
Total		41	452	2,899	6.4	36	46	437	1	27	20	7	1	0.5	0	0	0	1	2	0	0	0

== Professional career ==
Pre-draft measurables
Height	Weight	Arm length	Hand span	Wingspan	40-yard dash	10-yard split	20-yard split	20-yard shuttle	Three-cone drill	Vertical jump	Broad jump	Bench press
5 ft 10 3/4 in (1.80 m)	224 lb (102 kg)	31 1/2 in (0.80 m)	9 5/8 in (0.24 m)	6 ft 2 1/2 in (1.89 m)	4.60 s	1.56 s	2.66 s	4.36 s	7.09 s	33.0 in (0.84 m)	10 ft 0 in (3.05 m)	21 reps
All values from NFL Combine/Pro Day

=== Atlanta Falcons ===
==== 2022 season ====
Allgeier was selected in the fifth round of the 2022 NFL draft with the 151st overall pick by the Atlanta Falcons. He made his NFL debut in Week 2 against the Los Angeles Rams. In Week 4, against the Cleveland Browns, he had 104 scrimmage yards in the 23–20 victory. In Week 5, Allgeier made his first career start, due to a knee injury to running back Cordarrelle Patterson. In Week 7 against the Cincinnati Bengals, Allgeier recorded his first career rushing touchdown in the 17–35 loss. In Week 8 against the Carolina Panthers, Allgeier had his first career receiving touchdown in the 37–34 overtime win. In Week 15 against the New Orleans Saints, Allgeier recorded a season-high 139 rushing yards and a touchdown. In Week 17 against the Arizona Cardinals, Allgeier had 20 carries for 83 yards and a touchdown in the 20–19 win.

Allgeier finished his rookie season with 1,035 rushing yards, becoming the first Falcons running back since Devonta Freeman in 2016 and the first Falcons rookie running back since William Andrews in 1979 to rush for over a thousand yards. Allgeier also set the Falcons single-season rookie record for most rushing yards in a season, surpassing the mark previously set by Andrews. He was named to the PFWA All-Rookie Team.

==== 2023 season ====
Allgeier scored two rushing touchdowns in the Falcons' 2023 regular season opener, a 24–10 victory over the Panthers. He finished the 2023 season with 186 carries for 683 rushing yards and four rushing touchdowns to go with 18 receptions for 193 receiving yards and one receiving touchdown.

==== 2024 season ====
In 2024, Allgeier appeared in all 17 games as Atlanta’s No. 2 running back behind Bijan Robinson. He logged 137 rushing attempts for 644 yards (4.7 average) and three touchdowns, and added 13 receptions for 88 yards; he did not record a fumble. The Falcons finished 8–9 and missed the postseason.

==== 2025 season ====
In 2025, Allgeier reprised his role as Robinson's backup, appearing in 17 games (including two starts). In those games, he recorded 514 rushing yards and eight touchdowns, as well as 96 receiving yards.

=== Arizona Cardinals ===
==== 2026 season ====
On March 12, 2026, Allgeier signed a two-year, $12.25 million contract with the Arizona Cardinals.

In Week 8, Allgeier had a career game in the overtime victory against the Dallas Cowboys. He compiled 191 total scrimmage yards, with 147 yards rushing and 44 receiving, as well as a touchdown in both categories to help the Cardinals overcome a 14-point deficit and win 33–30 and was named NFC Offensive Player of the Week.

== NFL career statistics ==
Legend
**Bold**	Career best

Year	Team	Games		Rushing					Receiving					Fumbles	
Year	Team	GP	GS	Att	Yds	Avg	Lng	TD	Rec	Yds	Avg	Lng	TD	Fum	Lost
2022	ATL	16	**7**	**210**	**1,035**	**4.9**	**44**	3	16	139	8.7	26	**1**	0	0
2023	ATL	**17**	3	186	683	3.7	31	4	**18**	**193**	**10.7**	**75**	**1**	0	0
2024	ATL	**17**	0	137	644	4.7	25	3	13	88	6.8	13	0	0	0
2025	ATL	**17**	2	143	514	3.6	21	**8**	14	96	6.9	31	0	0	0
2026	ARI	10	6	94	383	4.1	63	2	23	128	5.6	22	1	0	0
Career		77	17	770	3,259	4.2	63	20	84	644	7.7	75	3	0	0
