= Aaron Roderick =

American football player and coach (born 1972)

Current position
- Title: Offensive coordinator
- Team: BYU
- Conference: Big 12

Biographical details
- Born: December 20, 1972 (age 53); Bountiful, Utah, U.S.

Playing career
- 1994–1995: Ricks
- 1996–1998: BYU
- Position: Wide receiver

Coaching career (HC unless noted)
- 1999–2001: BYU (GA)
- 2002: Snow (RB)
- 2003–2004: Southern Utah (OC/QB/RC)
- 2005–2009: Utah (WR)
- 2010: Utah (Co-OC/WR)
- 2011: Utah (WR)
- 2012–2013: Utah (PGC/WR)
- 2014: Utah (QB)
- 2015–2016: Utah (co-OC/QB)
- 2017: BYU (offensive consultant)
- 2018–2020: BYU (PGC/QB)
- 2021–present: BYU (OC/QB)

Aaron Roderick (December 20, 1972) is an American college football coach and former wide receiver who is currently the offensive coordinator and quarterbacks coach at Brigham Young University (BYU). He was previously BYU's passing game coordinator and quarterbacks coach from 2018 to 2020 and an offensive consultant in 2017. Roderick was previously in other assistant coaching roles, including at the University of Utah from 2005 to 2016 and Southern Utah University (SUU) from 2003 to 2004.

== Early life ==
Roderick was born on December 20, 1972, and grew up in Bountiful, Utah. He attended Bountiful High School, where he played football, baseball, and basketball.

== Coaching career ==
=== BYU ===
In 1999, Roderick began his coaching career at BYU, his alma mater, as a graduate assistant for the offense under head coach LaVell Edwards. When Edwards retired as BYU's head coach in 2001, Roderick was retained as a graduate assistant under new head coach Gary Crowton.

=== Snow College ===
In 2002, Roderick was hired as the running backs coach at Snow College.

=== Southern Utah ===
In 2003, Roderick was named the offensive coordinator, quarterbacks coach and recruiting coordinator at SUU.

=== Utah ===
In 2005, Roderick joined the University of Utah as the wide receivers coach. Before the 2009 season, Utah offered Roderick a promotion to co-offensive coordinator and wide receivers coach and he briefly accepted before opting to go to the University of Washington to serve as the wide receivers coach. A few weeks later, Roderick returned to Utah, citing personal reasons, to be the wide receivers coach. In 2010, Roderick was promoted to Utah's co-offensive coordinator and wide receivers coach.

=== BYU (second stint) ===
In 2017, Roderick returned to BYU as an offensive consultant. In 2018, Roderick was hired as the passing game coordinator and quarterbacks coach under head coach Kalani Sitake. In 2019, Roderick was a 2019 Broyles Award nominee, an annual award given to the nation's top assistant coach. On January 4, 2021, Roderick was promoted to offensive coordinator and quarterbacks coach, replacing Jeff Grimes, who left to become the offensive coordinator at Baylor University.

== Personal life ==
Roderick graduated from BYU in 1998 with a bachelor's degree in sociology, and earned a master's degree in sociology at BYU in 2002, while working as the running backs coach at Snow College. Roderick is married to Ellen McConnell and has three children.
