= Kaleb Hayes =

American football player (born 1999)

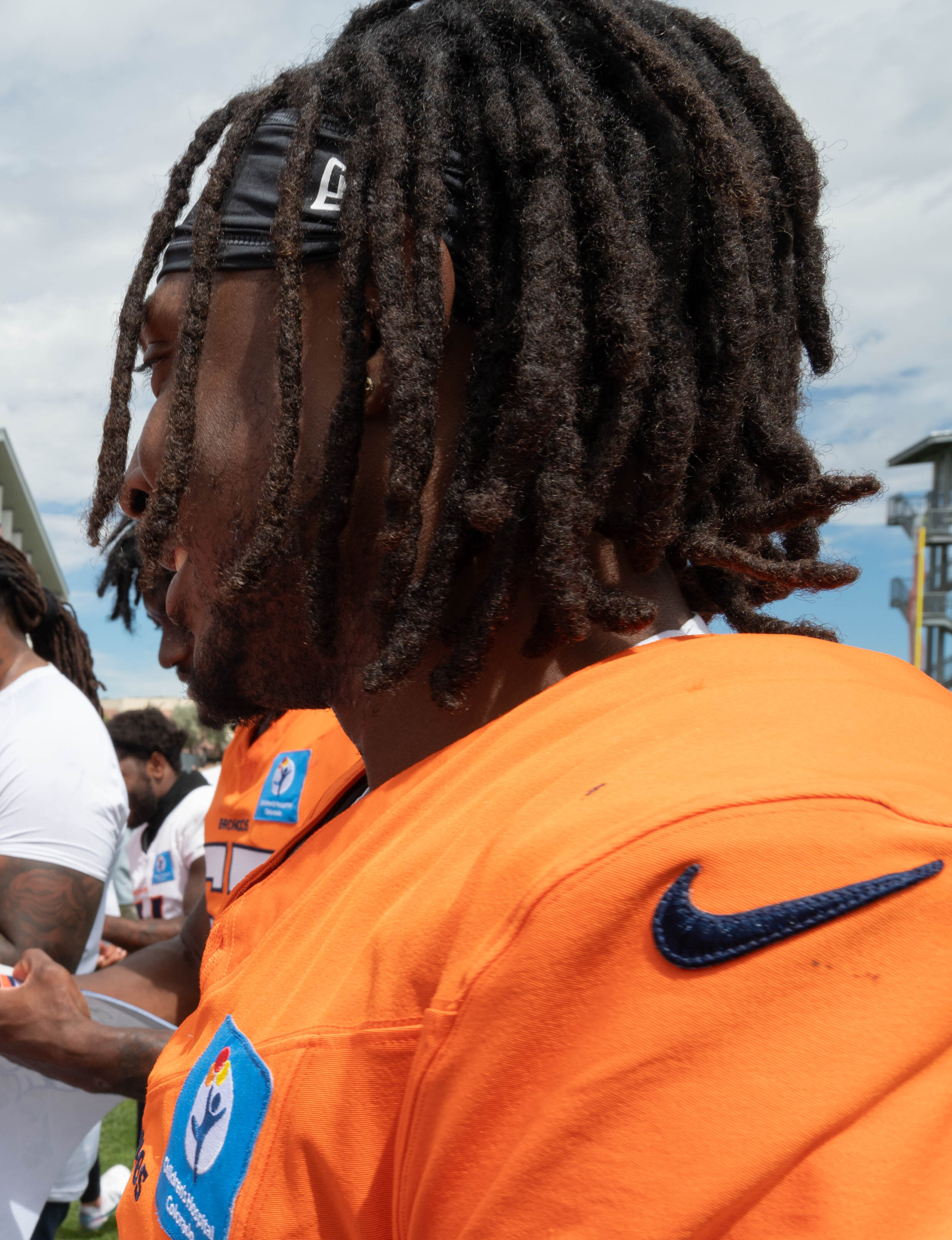
- Hayes with the Denver Broncos in 2024

No. 12 – Hamilton Tiger-Cats
- Position: Cornerback
- Roster status: Active
- CFL status: American

Personal information
- Born: March 19, 1999 (age 27); Pasadena, California, U.S.
- Listed height: 6 ft 0 in (1.83 m)
- Listed weight: 194 lb (88 kg)

Career information
- High school: San Gorgonio (San Bernardino, California)
- College: Oregon State (2017–2020); BYU (2021–2022)
- NFL draft: 2023: undrafted

Career history
- Jacksonville Jaguars (2023)*; New York Giants (2023)*; Denver Broncos (2024)*; Green Bay Packers (2025)*; Chicago Bears (2025)*; Hamilton Tiger-Cats (2026–present)
- * Offseason or practice squad member only
- Stats at Pro Football Reference

Kaleb Hayes (born March 19, 1999) is an American professional football cornerback for the Hamilton Tiger-Cats of the Canadian Football League (CFL). He played college football for the Oregon State Beavers and BYU Cougars.

== Early life ==
Hayes attended high school at San Gorgonio. Coming out of high school, Hayes was rated as a three star recruit, where he decided to commit to play college football for the Oregon State Beavers.

== College career ==
=== Oregon State ===
In Hayes first two collegiate seasons in 2018 and 2019, he totaled 46 tackles, eight pass deflections, and an interception, in 17 games. Hayes decided to sit out of the 2020 season, due to the COVID-19 pandemic. After the conclusion of the 2020 season, Hayes decided to enter his name into the NCAA transfer portal.

=== BYU ===
Hayes decided to transfer to play for the BYU Cougars. In the 2021 season, Hayes tallied 26 tackles and 12 pass deflections in his first year with the Cougars. Heading into the 2022 season, Hayes was named one of the team captains for the Cougars. During the 2022 season, Hayes played in twelve games, while making ten starts for the Cougars, where he notched 41 tackles and seven pass deflections.

== Professional career ==
Pre-draft measurables
Height	Weight	Arm length	Hand span	Wingspan	40-yard dash	10-yard split	20-yard split	20-yard shuttle	Three-cone drill	Vertical jump	Broad jump	Bench press
5 ft 11 1/2 in (1.82 m)	194 lb (88 kg)	32 5/8 in (0.83 m)	8 7/8 in (0.23 m)	6 ft 4 1/4 in (1.94 m)	4.33 s	1.54 s	2.53 s	4.27 s	6.88 s	40.0 in (1.02 m)	10 ft 8 in (3.25 m)	17 reps
All values from Pro Day

=== Jacksonville Jaguars ===
After not being drafted in the 2023 NFL draft, Hayes signed with the Jacksonville Jaguars as an undrafted free agent on May 1, 2023. However during final roster cuts, Hayes was released by the Jaguars.

=== New York Giants ===
On August 31, 2023, Hayes signed to the New York Giants practice squad. On January 8, 2024, after spending the entire 2023 season on the Giants practice squad, Hayes signed a futures contract with New York. He was waived on August 11, 2024.

=== Denver Broncos ===
On August 12, 2024, Hayes was claimed off waivers by the Denver Broncos. He was waived on August 26, 2024.

=== Green Bay Packers ===
On January 14, 2025, Hayes signed a reserve/futures contract with the Green Bay Packers. He was released by the Packers on May 21.

=== Chicago Bears ===
On July 4, 2025, Hayes signed with the Michigan Panthers of the United Football League (UFL). However, Hayes signed with the Chicago Bears on August 12, meaning he was never active for the Panthers in any practices or games. On August 25, Hayes was waived by the Bears.

=== Hamilton Tiger-Cats ===
Hayes signed with the Hamilton Tiger-Cats of the Canadian Football League (CFL) on January 20, 2026.
