= Ilaisa Tuiaki =

American football coach (born 1978)

Current position
- Title: Linebackers coach
- Team: Northern Colorado Bears
- Conference: Big Sky

Biographical details
- Born: December 6, 1978 (age 47); Kahuku, Hawaii, U.S.

Coaching career (HC unless noted)
- 2006: Kearns HS (UT) (WR/OLB)
- 2007: Kearns HS (UT) (OC)
- 2008: Utah (GA)
- 2009–2010: Utah State (RB/ST)
- 2011: Utah State (RB/RC)
- 2012: Utah (FB/TE)
- 2013–2014: Utah (DL)
- 2015: Oregon State (LB/ST)
- 2016–2022: BYU (DC/DL)
- 2024–2025: Oregon State (DL)
- 2026-present: Northern Colorado (LB)

Ilaisia Tuiaki (born December 6, 1978) is an American football coach who is the linebackers coach at the University of Northern Colorado. During his college playing career, Tuiaki was a linebacker and fullback at Southern Utah University (SUU) and Snow College. Tuiaki is a member of the Church of Jesus Christ of Latter-day Saints and earlier in his life served as an LDS missionary to New York City. In December 2015, Tuiaki was hired by Kalani Sitake to follow him to BYU as the defensive coordinator after serving as a coach at the University of Utah and Oregon State University with Sitake. Following the 2022 season, Tuiaki resigned his position as the defensive coordinator at BYU.

== Education ==
Tuiaki has a bachelor's degree in English and physical education from SUU (2006).
