= Jaren Hall =

American football player (born 1998)

No. 16, 15
- Position: Quarterback

Personal information
- Born: March 24, 1998 (age 28); Spanish Fork, Utah, U.S.
- Listed height: 6 ft 0 in (1.83 m)
- Listed weight: 207 lb (94 kg)

Career information
- High school: Maple Mountain (Spanish Fork)
- College: BYU (2018–2022)
- NFL draft: 2023: 5th round, 164th overall pick

Career history
- Minnesota Vikings (2023); Seattle Seahawks (2024); Birmingham Stallions (2026)*
- * Offseason or practice squad member only

Career NFL statistics
- Passing attempts: 20
- Passing completions: 13
- Completion percentage: 65.0%
- TD–INT: 0–1
- Passing yards: 168
- Passer rating: 70.4
- Stats at Pro Football Reference

Jaren Thomas Hall (born March 24, 1998) is an American former professional football player who was a quarterback for two seasons in the National Football League (NFL). He played college football for the BYU Cougars and was selected by the Minnesota Vikings in the fifth round of the 2023 NFL draft. He also played for the Seattle Seahawks.

== Early life ==
Hall attended Maple Mountain High School in Spanish Fork, Utah. During his career he had 5,109 passing yards and 52 touchdowns. He committed to Brigham Young University (BYU) to play college football.

== College career ==
Hall played in two games his first year at BYU in 2018 and took a redshirt. He played in seven games and made two starts as a backup to Zach Wilson. He became the first black quarterback to start a game for BYU, when he started in place of Wilson against South Florida. For the season, he completed 31 of 46 passes for 420 yards with one touchdown. After taking a medical redshirt in 2020, Hall took over as the starter in 2021. He completed 189 of 296 passes for 2,583 yards, 20 touchdowns and five interceptions.

Hall also played for BYU's baseball team in 2019 and 2020.

=== College statistics ===
Football

Season	Team	Games			Passing								Rushing			
Season	Team	GP	GS	Record	Cmp	Att	Pct	Yds	Avg	TD	Int	Rtg	Att	Yds	Avg	TD
2018	BYU	2	0	—	0	0	0.0	0	0.0	0	0	0.0	4	4	1.0	0
2019	BYU	7	2	1−1	31	46	67.4	420	9.1	1	0	151.3	29	139	4.8	3
2020	BYU	Medical Redshirt (redshirt)														
2021	BYU	10	10	8−2	189	296	63.9	2,583	8.7	20	5	156.1	62	307	5.0	3
2022	BYU	12	12	7−5	248	376	66.0	3,171	8.4	31	6	160.8	86	378	4.3	3
Career		31	24	16−8	468	718	65.2	6,174	8.6	52	11	158.2	181	800	4.4	9

Baseball

Season	Team														
Season	Team	G	PA	AB	R	H	2B	3B	HR	RBI	SB	CS	BB	SO	BA
2019	BYU	27	47	36	8	6	0	0	1	5	4	0	8	12	.167
2020	BYU	5	18	15	5	6	1	0	1	6	0	0	2	6	.400
Career		32	65	51	13	12	1	0	2	11	4	0	10	18	.235

== Professional career ==
Pre-draft measurables
Height	Weight	Arm length	Hand span	40-yard dash	10-yard split	20-yard split	20-yard shuttle	Three-cone drill
6 ft 0 1/8 in (1.83 m)	207 lb (94 kg)	29 3/4 in (0.76 m)	9 1/2 in (0.24 m)	4.64 s	1.59 s	2.71 s	4.19 s	7.06 s

=== Minnesota Vikings ===
Hall was selected by the Minnesota Vikings in the fifth round, 164th overall, of the 2023 NFL draft.

In Week 8, he played his first regular season snaps after Vikings starting quarterback Kirk Cousins suffered a torn Achilles tendon.

Hall started his first NFL game on November 5, 2023, but left the game after suffering a concussion. After clearing concussion protocol, Hall backed up Joshua Dobbs and Nick Mullens.

In Week 17, he started against the Green Bay Packers. He completed five of ten passes for 67 yards, an interception, and a lost fumble as Hall was benched at halftime.

On Aug 24 2024, he played in a preseason game against the Eagles. He completed 28 of 46 passes for 339 yards, four touchdowns and no interceptions.

On August 29, 2024, Hall was waived by the Vikings to make room for Brett Rypien.

=== Seattle Seahawks ===
On September 2, 2024, the Seattle Seahawks signed Hall to their practice squad. He was promoted to the active roster to be the team's emergency third QB on December 1 (vs the New York Jets), December 14 (vs the Green Bay Packers), December 21 (vs the Minnesota Vikings), and December 26 (vs the Chicago Bears).

On April 29, 2025, Hall was released by the Seahawks.

=== Birmingham Stallions ===
On January 12, 2026, Hall signed with the Birmingham Stallions of the United Football League (UFL). He was removed from the team's roster on January 26. On May 13, Hall announced his retirement from professional football on Instagram.

== NFL career statistics ==
Year	Team	Games			Passing									Rushing					Sacks		Fumbles	
Year	Team	GP	GS	Record	Cmp	Att	Pct	Yds	Y/A	Lng	TD	Int	Rtg	Att	Yds	Avg	Lng	TD	Sck	SckY	Fum	Lost
2023	MIN	3	2	1−1	13	20	65.0	168	8.4	47	0	1	70.4	6	14	2.3	8	0	4	28	2	2
Career		3	2	1−1	13	20	65.0	168	8.4	47	0	1	70.4	6	14	2.3	8	0	4	28	2	2

== Personal life ==
Before enrolling at BYU, Hall served a two-year mission for The Church of Jesus Christ of Latter-day Saints in Roseville, California. He and Breanna Hall married in 2019.
