= Baylor Romney =

American football quarterback

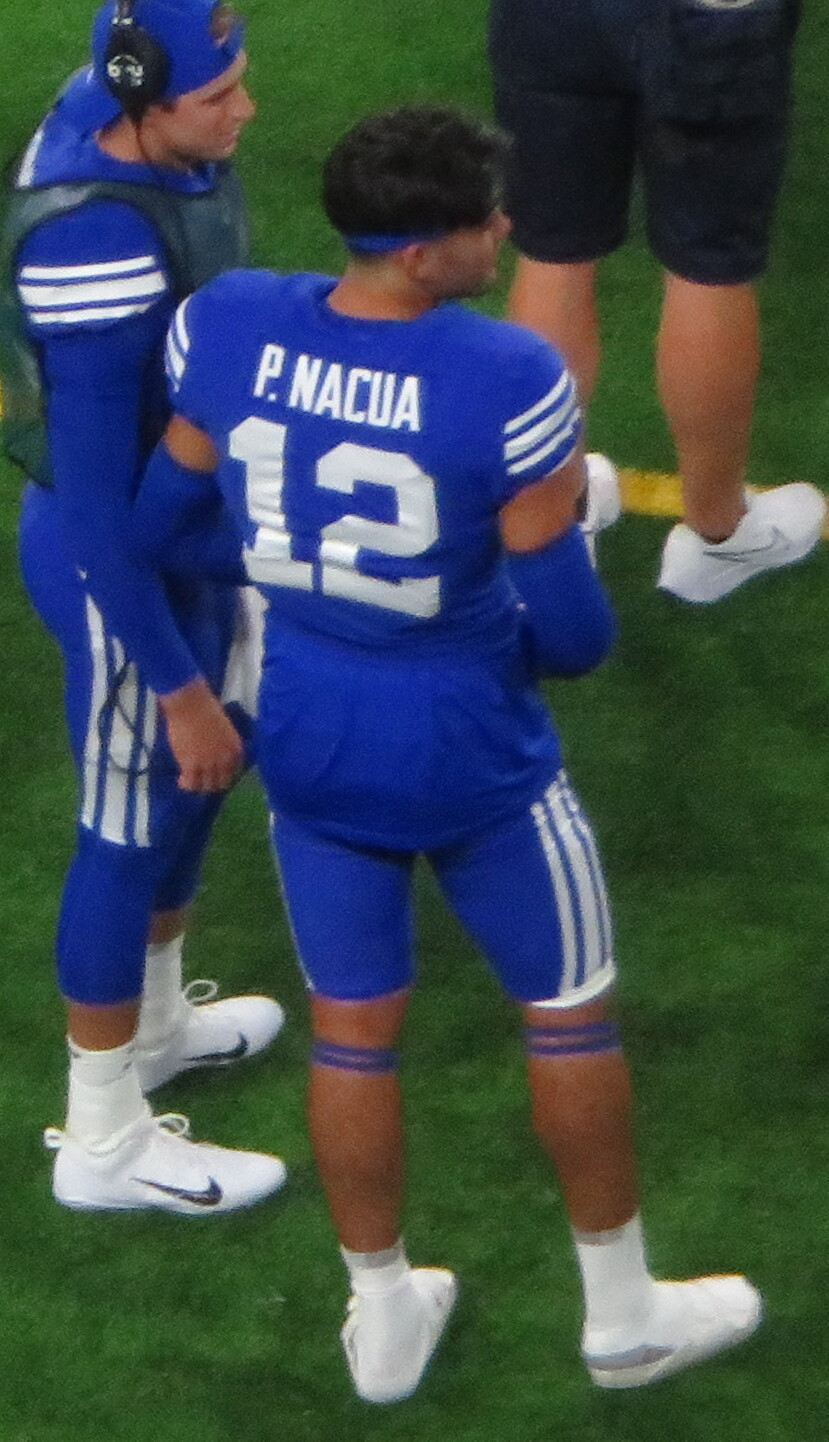
- Romney (left) with the BYU Cougars in 2021

No. 16
- Position: Quarterback

Personal information
- Born: El Paso, Texas, U.S.
- Listed height: 6 ft 2 in (1.88 m)
- Listed weight: 195 lb (88 kg)

Career information
- High school: Franklin High School
- College: BYU (2018–2021)

Awards and highlights
- El Paso All-City team (2014)
- Stats at ESPN

Baylor Romney is an American former football quarterback. He played college football for the BYU Cougars.

== Early life ==
Romney grew up in a Latter-day Saint colony in Mexico, but moved to El Paso, Texas prior to his freshman year of high school. Romney graduated from Franklin High School in 2015. Romney's family later moved to Chandler, Arizona as his brother Gunner began attending Chandler High School.

Romney originally committed to Nevada on August 11, 2014, and signed with the team on February 4, 2015. However, after going on an LDS mission to Carlsbad, California, he enrolled at Brigham Young University. He joined the team as a walk-on, in order to realize a lifelong dream of playing with his brother.

== College career ==
Romney redshirted in 2018 before playing in four games in 2019, starting two of them against the Boise State Broncos and the Liberty Flames. He threw for 747 yards and seven touchdowns, and had two interceptions. Notably, against the Utah State Aggies, he threw one-yard touchdown to his younger brother Gunner, becoming the first brothers to do so in BYU history.

He played in seven games in 2020, throwing a touchdown pass and an interception. In the 2021 season, he played in five games and started in two, and threw another touchdown to his brother against the South Florida Bulls. At the end of the 2021 season, Romney announced that he would enter the transfer portal. After six weeks in the transfer portal, Romney announced his retirement.

=== Statistics ===
Season	Team	Games			Passing								Rushing			
Season	Team	GP	GS	Record	Cmp	Att	Pct	Yds	Avg	TD	Int	Rtg	Att	Yds	Avg	TD
2018	BYU	0	0	—	(redshirt) Redshirted											
2019	BYU	4	2	2–0	54	85	63.5	747	8.8	7	2	159.8	24	59	2.5	0
2020	BYU	7	7	0–0	24	35	68.6	261	7.5	1	1	134.9	7	21	3.0	0
2021	BYU	5	2	2–0	56	80	70.0	779	9.7	6	0	176.5	10	-4	-0.4	0
Career		16	11	4–0	134	200	67.0	1,787	8.9	14	3	162.2	41	76	1.9	0

== Personal life ==
His wife, Elise, competed in pole vault for the BYU track and field team. His brother, Gunner, was a wide receiver for the Cougars. His other brother, Tate, is a linebacker for the Oklahoma State Cowboys, and previously played for the Cougars and the Arizona State Sun Devils.

He is a distant relative of former Utah Senator and 2012 presidential candidate Mitt Romney.
