= List of BYU Cougars in the NFL draft =

This is a list of Brigham Young University Cougars football players in the NFL draft.

== Key ==
B	Back	K	Kicker	NT	Nose tackle
C	Center	LB	Linebacker	FB	Fullback
DB	Defensive back	P	Punter	HB	Halfback
DE	Defensive end	QB	Quarterback	WR	Wide receiver
DT	Defensive tackle	RB	Running back	G	Guard
E	End	T	Offensive tackle	TE	Tight end

== Selections ==
Year	Round	Pick	Overall	Player	Team	Position
1938	9	3	73	John Stringham	Brooklyn Dodgers	B
1939	21	2	192	Merrill Waters	Detroit Lions	E
1942	16	6	146	Dean Chipman	Washington Redskins	B
1942	17	1	151	Garth Chamberlain	Pittsburgh Steelers	G
1946	14	4	124	Dick Chatterton	Chicago Bears	B
1947	16	1	136	Reed Nielsen	Detroit Lions	C
1947	19	6	171	Scotty Deeds	Chicago Cardinals	B
1947	28	2	257	Dick Chatterton	Boston Yanks	B
1948	31	4	289	Gayland Mills	Green Bay Packers	E
1949	16	1	152	Kimball Merrill	Detroit Lions	T
1951	14	3	162	Rex Berry	San Francisco 49ers	DB
1952	14	8	165	Ray Oliverson	Detroit Lions	B
1954	22	12	256	Dewey Brundage	Detroit Lions	DE
1955	17	7	200	Bob Bills	New York Giants	B
1957	18	10	215	Jay Weenig	Detroit Lions	G
1960	7	6	78	Lonnie Dennis	Pittsburgh Steelers	G
1960	10	6	114	John Kapele	Pittsburgh Steelers	DE
1962	19	2	146	Kent Horne	Oakland Raiders	T
1962	11	12	152	Kent Horne	Philadelphia Eagles	T
1963	17	12	236	Gene Frantz	Detroit Lions	B
1964	21	8	168	Alan Robinson	San Diego Chargers	B
1964	16	6	216	Alan Robinson	Detroit Lions	B
1966	10	2	84	Dennis Brewster	Boston Patriots	T
1966	6	5	85	Dennis Brewster	Chicago Bears	T
1967	3	11	64	Curg Belcher	Washington Redskins	DB
1967	6	9	142	Virgil Carter	Chicago Bears	QB
1967	11	6	269	Lou Andrus	Denver Broncos	DE
1967	14	22	363	Casey Boyett	Oakland Raiders	WR
1968	5	9	120	Phil Odle	Detroit Lions	WR
1968	9	14	233	Casey Boyett	San Francisco 49ers	WR
1968	13	5	332	Max Huber	New England Patriots	T
1968	17	13	449	Dennis Patera	San Francisco 49ers	K
1969	8	16	198	Mike Loper	San Francisco 49ers	T
1970	14	11	349	Jeff Slipp	Denver Broncos	LB
1971	3	6	58	Chris Farasopoulos	New York Jets	DB
1972	2	12	38	Gordon Gravelle	Pittsburgh Steelers	T
1972	4	4	82	Jeff Lyman	St. Louis Cardinals	LB
1973	3	2	54	Paul Howard	Denver Broncos	G
1973	3	14	66	Pete Van Valkenburg	New Orleans Saints	RB
1973	15	19	383	Dan Hansen	San Francisco 49ers	DB
1974	10	20	254	Dave Atkinson	Pittsburgh Steelers	DB
1974	14	21	359	Doug Richards	Dallas Cowboys	DB
1975	3	12	64	Gary Sheide	Cincinnati Bengals	QB
1975	3	22	74	Wayne Baker	San Francisco 49ers	DT
1975	4	15	93	Paul Linford	Baltimore Colts	DT
1976	3	23	83	Brad Oates	St. Louis Cardinals	T
1976	6	13	169	Stan Varner	Atlanta Falcons	DT
1976	8	13	222	Orrin Olsen	Kansas City Chiefs	C
1976	10	2	267	Sid Smith	Tampa Bay Buccaneers	LB
1976	17	26	485	Gary Shaw	Los Angeles Rams	DB
1977	5	24	136	Dave Hubbard	New Orleans Saints	T
1977	8	4	199	Bill Rice	New York Giants	DT
1977	11	16	295	Brian Billick	San Francisco 49ers	TE
1978	2	28	56	Todd Christensen	Dallas Cowboys	TE
1978	3	17	73	Gifford Nielsen	Houston Oilers	QB
1978	6	20	158	Mekeli Ieremia	Chicago Bears	DE
1978	9	19	241	Lance Reynolds	Pittsburgh Steelers	T
1979	8	7	199	Larry Miller	St. Louis Cardinals	LB
1979	10	27	275	Tod Thompson	Pittsburgh Steelers	TE
1980	1	15	15	Marc Wilson	Oakland Raiders	QB
1980	2	27	55	Mat Mendenhall	Washington Redskins	DE
1981	2	14	42	Clay Brown	Denver Broncos	TE
1981	3	25	81	Glen Titensor	Dallas Cowboys	DE
1981	4	4	87	Scott Phillips	Seattle Seahawks	WR
1981	4	23	106	Nick Eyre	Houston Oilers	T
1981	6	28	166	Glen Redd	New Orleans Saints	LB
1981	8	2	195	Lloyd Jones	New York Jets	WR
1981	8	3	196	Eric Lane	Seattle Seahawks	RB
1982	1	5	5	Jim McMahon	Chicago Bears	QB
1982	4	23	106	Dan Plater	Denver Broncos	WR
1983	4	6	90	Tom Holmoe	San Francisco 49ers	DB
1983	12	22	329	Chuck Ehin	San Diego Chargers	DT
1984	1	24	24	Todd Shell	San Francisco 49ers	LB
1984	11	24	304	Kirk Pendleton	San Francisco 49ers	WR
1984	1	1	1	Steve Young	Tampa Bay Buccaneers	QB
1984	1	22	22	Gordon Hudson	Seattle Seahawks	TE
1985	1	28	28	Trevor Matich	New England Patriots	C
1985	4	22	106	Kyle Morrell	Minnesota Vikings	DB
1985	5	19	131	Louis Wong	St. Louis Cardinals	G
1985	5	26	138	Lee Johnson	Houston Oilers	K
1985	7	16	184	Jim Herrmann	Dallas Cowboys	DE
1986	3	17	72	Robbie Bosco	Green Bay Packers	QB
1986	5	13	123	Leon White	Cincinnati Bengals	LB
1986	8	19	213	Kurt Gouveia	Washington Redskins	LB
1986	9	9	230	Cary Whittingham	Cincinnati Bengals	LB
1986	10	5	254	Vai Sikahema	St. Louis Cardinals	RB
1986	11	28	305	Glen Kozlowski	Chicago Bears	WR
1986	12	15	320	Jeff Sprowls	San Diego Chargers	DB
1987	1	11	11	Shawn Knight	New Orleans Saints	DT
1987	1	17	17	Jason Buck	Cincinnati Bengals	DE
1987	7	2	170	Mark Bellini	Indianapolis Colts	WR
1987	9	26	249	Lakei Heimuli	Chicago Bears	RB
1988	5	17	126	Rodney Thomas	Miami Dolphins	DB
1988	12	8	313	David Futrell	New York Giants	DT
1988	12	14	319	Steve Kaufusi	Philadelphia Eagles	DE
1989	3	24	80	John Hunter	Minnesota Vikings	T
1989	8	15	210	Rodney Rice	New England Patriots	DB
1989	8	20	215	Warren Wheat	Los Angeles Rams	T
1990	3	23	76	Mo Elewonibi	Washington Redskins	G
1991	6	4	143	Neal Fort	Los Angeles Rams	T
1991	7	5	172	Brian Mitchell	Atlanta Falcons	DB
1991	11	17	295	Chris Smith	Cincinnati Bengals	TE
1992	9	6	230	Ty Detmer	Green Bay Packers	QB
1993	4	8	92	Derwin Gray	Indianapolis Colts	DB
1995	3	23	87	Evan Pilgrim	Chicago Bears	G
1995	4	29	127	Tim Hanshaw	San Francisco 49ers	TE
1995	6	10	181	Travis Hall	Atlanta Falcons	DT
1995	6	19	190	Eli Herring	Oakland Raiders	T
1995	7	5	213	John Walsh	Cincinnati Bengals	QB
1996	3	34	95	Mike Ulufale	Dallas Cowboys	DT
1997	6	11	174	Itula Mili	Seattle Seahawks	TE
1998	5	26	149	Eric Bateman	New York Jets	T
1998	6	30	183	Dustin Johnson	New York Jets	RB
1998	7	22	211	Jason Andersen	New England Patriots	C
1999	1	14	14	John Tait	Kansas City Chiefs	T
1999	6	19	188	Daren Yancey	Oakland Raiders	DT
1999	7	38	244	Joe Wong	Miami Dolphins	G
2000	1	28	28	Rob Morris	Indianapolis Colts	LB
2000	3	31	93	Byron Frisch	Tennessee Titans	DE
2000	5	9	138	Matt Johnson	Indianapolis Colts	G
2001	7	16	216	Owen Pochman	New England Patriots	K
2001	7	46	246	Tevita Ofahengaue	Arizona Cardinals	TE
2002	2	23	55	Doug Jolley	Oakland Raiders	TE
2002	2	29	61	Ryan Denney	Buffalo Bills	DE
2002	5	28	163	Brandon Doman	San Francisco 49ers	QB
2002	7	3	214	Luke Staley	Detroit Lions	RB
2002	7	31	242	Brett Keisel	Pittsburgh Steelers	DE
2003	6	31	204	Dustin Rykert	Oakland Raiders	T
2003	7	20	234	Spencer Nead	New England Patriots	TE
2004	7	39	240	Colby Bockwoldt	New Orleans Saints	LB
2005	4	24	125	Brady Poppinga	Green Bay Packers	DE
2005	5	36	172	Scott Young	Philadelphia Eagles	G
2005	7	14	228	Shaun Nua	Pittsburgh Steelers	DE
2006	7	10	218	Todd Watkins	Arizona Cardinals	WR
2007	2	8	40	John Beck	Miami Dolphins	QB
2008	4	24	123	Bryan Kehl	New York Giants	LB
2009	4	27	127	Austin Collie	Indianapolis Colts	WR
2009	7	6	215	Fui Vakapuna	Cincinnati Bengals	FB
2010	4	16	114	Dennis Pitta	Baltimore Ravens	TE
2013	1	5	5	Ezekiel Ansah	Detroit Lions	DE
2014	2	8	40	Kyle Van Noy	Detroit Lions	LB
2016	3	7	70	Bronson Kaufusi	Baltimore Ravens	DE
2017	4	27	134	Jamaal Williams	Green Bay Packers	RB
2018	3	6	70	Fred Warner	San Francisco 49ers	LB
2019	3	16	80	Sione Takitaki	Cleveland Browns	LB
2021	1	2	2	Zach Wilson	New York Jets	QB
2021	3	6	70	Brady Christensen	Carolina Panthers	T
2021	7	22	250	Khyiris Tonga	Chicago Bears	DT
2021	7	23	251	Chris Wilcox	Tampa Bay Buccaneers	DB
2021	7	30	258	Dax Milne	Washington Football Team	WR
2022	5	8	151	Tyler Allgeier	Atlanta Falcons	RB
2023	4	4	106	Blake Freeland	Indianapolis Colts	T
2023	5	29	164	Jaren Hall	Minnesota Vikings	QB
2023	5	42	177	Puka Nacua	Los Angeles Rams	WR
2024	2	31	63	Kingsley Suamataia	Kansas City Chiefs	T
2026	6	12	193	Jack Kelly	New York Giants	LB
2026	7	32	248	Carsen Ryan	Cleveland Browns	TE

== Notable undrafted players ==
Note: No drafts held before 1936

Year	Player	Debut team	Position	Notes
1935	Burle Robison	Philadelphia Eagles	E/C	—
1960	Nyle McFarlane	Oakland Raiders	B	—
1960	Dick Felt	New York Titans	DB	—
1964	Fred Whittingham	Los Angeles Rams	LB	—
1969	Philip Brady	Denver Broncos	DB	—
1980	Tom Bell	Green Bay Packers	G	—
1980	Mike Chronister	Cincinnati Bengals	WR	—
1980	Bill Ring	Pittsburgh Steelers	RB	—
1982	Brad Anae	Philadelphia Eagles	DE	—
1982	Kyle Whittingham	Los Angeles Rams	LB	—
1983	Bart Oates	New York Giants	C	Pro Bowl (1990), (1991), (1993), (1994), (1995) Super Bowl Champion (Super Bowl XXI), (Super Bowl XXV), (Super Bowl XXIX)
1984	Doug Kellermeyer	Houston Oilers	T	—
1985	Mark Allen	Green Bay Packers	DB	—
1985	Adam Haysbert	Seattle Seahawks	WR	—
1985	Ronnie O'Bard	San Diego Chargers	DB	—
1985	Vince Stroth	San Francisco 49ers	T	—
1987	David Aupiu	Los Angeles Rams	LB	—
1987	Bruce Hansen	New England Patriots	RB	—
1987	Chris Matau	Los Angeles Rams	G	—
1987	Robert Parker	Kansas City Chiefs	RB	—
1987	Steve Rogers	Kansas City Chiefs	T	—
1987	Casey Tiumalu	Los Angeles Rams	RB	—
1990	Eric Bergeson	Atlanta Falcons	DB	—
1990	Craig Patterson	Phoenix Cardinals	DE	—
1991	Mike Keim	Seattle Seahawks	T	—
1992	Peter Tuipulotu	San Diego Chargers	RB	—
1993	Scott Brumfield	Cincinnati Bengals	G	—
1995	Jamal Willis	Kansas City Chiefs	RB	—
1996	Morris Unutoa	Philadelphia Eagles	C	Super Bowl Champion (Super Bowl XXXVII)
1997	Chad Lewis	Philadelphia Eagles	TE	Pro Bowl (2000), (2001), (2002) Super Bowl Champion (Super Bowl XXXIV)
1997	Kaipo McGuire	Indianapolis Colts	WR	—
1997	Tim McTyer	Philadelphia Eagles	DB	—
1998	Larry Moore	Indianapolis Colts	G	—
1998	Spencer Reid	Carolina Panthers	LB	—
2000	Kevin Feterik	Seattle Seahawks	QB	—
2000	Carlos Nuno	Miami Dolphins	TE	
2001	Chris Hoke	Pittsburgh Steelers	DT	Super Bowl Champion (Super Bowl XL), (Super Bowl XLIII)
2001	Hans Olsen	Indianapolis Colts	DT	—
2002	Aaron Edmonds	Detroit Lions	P	—
2002	Justin Ena	Philadelphia Eagles	LB	—
2002	Teag Whiting	Arizona Cardinals	T	—
2003	Reno Mahe	Philadelphia Eagles	RB	—
2003	Gabe Reid	Chicago Bears	TE	—
2005	Ben Archibald	New Orleans Saints	G	—
2005	John Denney	Miami Dolphins	DE/LS	Pro Bowl (2010), (2012)
2005	Aaron Francisco	Arizona Cardinals	DB	—
2007	Curtis Brown	Cincinnati Bengals	RB	—
2007	Daniel Coats	Cincinnati Bengals	TE	—
2007	Naufahu Tahi	Minnesota Vikings	RB	—
2009	David Nixon	Oakland Raiders	LB	—
2009	Dallas Reynolds	Philadelphia Eagles	C	—
2010	Ray Feinga	Miami Dolphins	G	—
2010	Max Hall	Arizona Cardinals	QB	—
2011	Vic So'oto	Green Bay Packers	LB	—
2011	Manase Tonga	Oakland Raiders	FB	—
2012	Hebron Fangupo	Pittsburgh Steelers	DT	—
2012	Matt Reynolds	Philadelphia Eagles	T	—
2014	Spencer Hadley	Oakland Raiders	LB	—
2014	Daniel Sorensen	Kansas City Chiefs	DB	Super Bowl Champion (Super Bowl LIII)
2014	Uani Unga	New York Giants	LB	—
2015	Robertson Daniel	Oakland Raiders	DB	—
2015	Alani Fua	Arizona Cardinals	LB	—
2015	De'Ondre Wesley	Baltimore Ravens	T	—
2015	Jordan Leslie	Cleveland Browns	WR	—
2016	Paul Lasike	Chicago Bears	FB	—
2017	Algie Brown	Seattle Seahawks	FB	—
2017	Taysom Hill	Green Bay Packers	QB	—
2017	Harvey Langi	New England Patriots	LB	—
2017	Kai Nacua	Cleveland Browns	DB	—
2017	Michael Davis	Los Angeles Chargers	DB	—
2018	Jonah Trinnaman	Arizona Cardinals	WR	—
2018	Tejan Koroma	Kansas City Chiefs	C	—
2018	Micah Hannemann	Cleveland Browns	DB	—
2019	Corbin Kaufusi	New Orleans Saints	DE	—
2020	Ty'Son Williams	Baltimore Ravens	RB	—
2020	Francis Bernard	Dallas Cowboys	LB	—
2021	Zayne Anderson	Kansas City Chiefs	DB	—
2021	Matt Bushman	Las Vegas Raiders	TE	—
2022	James Empey	Dallas Cowboys	C	
2022	Samson Nacua	Indianapolis Colts	WR	—
2022	Neil Pau'u	Buffalo Bills	WR	—
2023	Christopher Brooks	Miami Dolphins	RB	—
2024	Ryan Rehkow	Kansas City Chiefs	P	—
2024	Isaac Rex	Detroit Lions	TE	—
2024	Kedon Slovis	Indianapolis Colts	QB	—
2024	Max Tooley	Houston Texans	LB	—
2025	Tyler Batty	Minnesota Vikings	LB	—
2025	Caleb Etienne	Cincinnati Bengals	OT	—
2025	Jakob Robinson	San Francisco 49ers	CB	—
2026	Mory Bamba	New York Jets	CB	—
2026	Will Ferrin	New York Jets	PK	—
2026	Garrison Grimes	New York Jets	LS	—
2026	Chase Roberts	Las Vegas Raiders	WR	—
2026	Tanner Wall	Las Vegas Raiders	S	—
