= BYU Cougars football statistical leaders =

The BYU Cougars football statistical leaders are individual statistical leaders of the BYU Cougars football program in various categories, including passing, rushing, receiving, total offense, all-purpose yardage, defensive stats, and kicking. Within those areas, the lists identify single-game, single-season, and career leaders. The Cougars represent Brigham Young University as a member of the NCAA Division I FBS Big 12 Conference.

Although BYU began competing in intercollegiate football in 1922, these lists are dominated by more recent players for several reasons:

- Since 1922, seasons have increased from 6 games to 11 and then 12 games in length.
- The NCAA didn't allow freshmen to play varsity football until 1972 (with the exception of the World War II years), allowing players to have four-year careers.
- Bowl games only began counting toward single-season and career statistics in 2002. The Cougars have played in 16 bowl games since then, allowing many recent players an extra game to accumulate statistics.
- Similarly, the Cougars have played games at Hawaii 16 times since 1978. When a team plays at Hawaii, they are allowed to schedule another game beyond the usual limit.
- From 2018 through 2025, players were allowed to participate in as many as four games in a redshirt season; previously, playing in even one game "burned" the redshirt. In 2024 and 2025, postseason games did not count against the four-game limit. These changes to redshirt rules have given very recent players several extra games to accumulate statistics.
- A more recent change that will have a major effect on future career leaderboards was introduced in 2026 with full implementation starting with the 2027 freshman class. Going forward, redshirting will be prohibited, but players will have five years of full athletic eligibility, provided that they are no older than 19 when they first enroll in a postsecondary institution—with a caveat especially relevant to BYU. This rule change specifically maintained the NCAA's longstanding practice of not counting time spent on religious missions against athletic eligibility. With most male LDS Church members, including many future BYU players, going on missions immediately after high school graduation, their eligibility clock will not start until after they complete their two-year mission term. Players who had remaining eligibility under previous rules at the end of the 2025 season will benefit from the new rule.
- Due to COVID-19 issues, the NCAA ruled that the 2020 season would not count against the athletic eligibility of any football player, giving everyone who played in that season the opportunity for five years of eligibility instead of the normal four.
- The Big 12 has held a championship game during two different periods—first from 1996–2010, and since 2017. Should BYU qualify for this game in any season, it will be assured of playing at least 14 games.

These lists are updated through Week 12 of the 2026 season. Active players are listed in bold.

== Passing ==
=== Passing yards ===
Career
Rank	Player	Yards	Years
1	Ty Detmer	15,031	1988 1989 1990 1991
2	Max Hall	11,365	2007 2008 2009
3	John Beck	11,021	2003 2004 2005 2006
4	Jim McMahon	9,536	1977 1978 1980 1981
5	Robbie Bosco	8,400	1983 1984 1985
6	John Walsh	8,390	1991 1992 1993 1994
7	Kevin Feterik	8,065	1996 1997 1998 1999
8	Steve Young	7,733	1981 1982 1983
9	Zach Wilson	7,652	2018 2019 2020
10	Marc Wilson	7,637	1977 1978 1979

Single season
Rank	Player	Yards	Year
1	Ty Detmer	5,188	1990
2	Jim McMahon	4,571	1980
3	Ty Detmer	4,560	1989
4	Robbie Bosco	4,273	1985
5	Ty Detmer	4,031	1991
6	Steve Sarkisian	4,027	1996
7	Max Hall	3,957	2008
8	Steve Young	3,902	1983
9	John Beck	3,885	2006
10	Robbie Bosco	3,875	1984

Single game
Rank	Player	Yards	Year	Opponent
1	John Walsh	619	1993	Utah State
2	Ty Detmer	599	1991	San Diego State
3	Robbie Bosco	585	1985	New Mexico
4	Ty Detmer	576	1989	Penn State
5	Marc Wilson	571	1977	Utah

=== Passing touchdowns ===
Career
Rank	Player	TDs	Years
1	Ty Detmer	121	1988 1989 1990 1991
2	Max Hall	94	2007 2008 2009
3	Jim McMahon	84	1977 1978 1980 1981
4	John Beck	79	2003 2004 2005 2006
5	Robbie Bosco	66	1983 1984 1985
5	John Walsh	66	1991 1992 1993 1994
7	Marc Wilson	61	1977 1978 1979
8	Steve Young	56	1981 1982 1983
8	Zach Wilson	56	2018 2019 2020
10	Gifford Nielsen	55	1974 1975 1976 1977

Single season
Rank	Player	TDs	Year
1	Jim McMahon	47	1980
2	Ty Detmer	41	1990
3	Ty Detmer	35	1991
3	Max Hall	35	2008
5	Steve Young	33	1983
5	Robbie Bosco	33	1984
5	Steve Sarkisian	33	1996
5	Brandon Doman	33	2001
5	Max Hall	33	2009
5	Zach Wilson	33	2020

Single game
Rank	Player	TDs	Year	Opponent
1	Marc Wilson	7	1977	Colorado State
1	Jim McMahon	7	1981	Colorado State
1	Max Hall	7	2008	UCLA

== Rushing ==
=== Rushing yards ===
Career
Rank	Player	Yards	Years
1	Jamaal Williams	3,901	2012 2013 2014 2016
2	Harvey Unga	3,455	2006 2007 2008 2009
3	Curtis Brown	3,221	2002 2004 2005 2006
4	**LJ Martin**	3,080	2023 2024 2025 2026
5	Jamal Willis	2,970	1991 1992 1993 1994
6	Tyler Allgeier	2,904	2018 2019 2020 2021
7	Taysom Hill	2,813	2012 2013 2014 2015 2016
8	Lakei Heimuli	2,710	1983 1984 1985 1986
9	Jeff Blanc	2,663	1973 1974 1975 1976
10	Luke Staley	2,493	1999 2000 2001

Single season
Rank	Player	Yards	Year
1	Tyler Allgeier	1,606	2021
2	Luke Staley	1,582	2001
3	Pete Van Valkenburg	1,386	1972
4	Jamaal Williams	1,375	2016
5	Taysom Hill	1,344	2013
6	Ronney Jenkins	1,307	1998
7	LJ Martin	1,305	2025
8	Jamaal Williams	1,233	2013
9	Harvey Unga	1,227	2007
10	Harvey Unga	1,132	2008

Single game
Rank	Player	Yards	Year	Opponent
1	Jamaal Williams	286	2016	Toledo
2	Eldon Fortie	272	1962	George Washington
3	Tyler Allgeier	266	2021	Virginia
4	Taysom Hill	259	2013	Texas
5	Ronney Jenkins	250	1998	San Jose State

=== Rushing touchdowns ===
Career
Rank	Player	TDs	Years
1	Luke Staley	41	1999 2000 2001
2	Tyler Allgeier	36	2018 2019 2020 2021
	Harvey Unga	36	2006 2007 2008 2009
4	Jamal Willis	35	1991 1992 1993 1994
	Jamaal Williams	35	2012 2013 2014 2016
6	Taysom Hill	32	2012 2013 2014 2015 2016
7	Curtis Brown	31	2002 2004 2005 2006
8	Lakei Heimuli	30	1983 1984 1985 1986
9	**LJ Martin**	28	2023 2024 2025 2026
10	Pete Van Valkenburg	24	1969 1970 1971 1972
	Ronney Jenkins	24	1996 1998

Single season
Rank	Player	TDs	Year
1	Luke Staley	24	2001
2	Tyler Allgeier	23	2021
3	Eldon Fortie	14	1962
3	Waymon Hamilton	14	1981
3	Lakei Heimuli	14	1985
3	Curtis Brown	14	2005
7	Ronney Jenkins	13	1972
7	Harvey Unga	13	2007
7	Tyler Allgeier	13	2020
10	Pete Van Valkenburg	12	1972
10	Jamal Willis	12	1994
10	Brian McKenzie	12	1997
10	Jamaal Williams	12	2012
10	Jamaal Williams	12	2016
10	LJ Martin	12	2025

Single game
Rank	Player	TDs	Year	Opponent
1	Eric Lane	5	1979	Utah State
1	Luke Staley	5	2001	Colorado State
1	Jamaal Williams	5	2016	Toledo
1	Tyler Allgeier	5	2021	Virginia
5	Dick Felt	4	1952	San Jose State
5	John Ogden	4	1964	Western Michigan
5	Ronney Jenkins	4	1998	San Jose State

== Receiving ==
=== Receptions ===
Career
Rank	Player	Rec	Years
1	Cody Hoffman	260	2010 2011 2012 2013
2	Dennis Pitta	221	2004 2007 2008 2009
3	Austin Collie	215	2004 2007 2008
4	Matt Bellini	204	1987 1988 1989 1990
5	Margin Hooks	189	1997 1998 1999 2000
6	Phil Odle	183	1965 1966 1967 1968
7	Gordon Hudson	178	1981 1982 1983
8	Chase Roberts	170	2022 2023 2024 2025
9	Reno Mahe	166	1998 2001 2002
10	Eric Drage	162	1990 1991 1992 1993

Single season
Rank	Player	Rec	Year
1	Austin Collie	106	2008
2	Jay Miller	100	1973
2	Cody Hoffman	100	2012
4	Reno Mahe	91	2001
5	Dennis Pitta	83	2008
6	Andy Boyce	79	1990
7	Phil Odle	77	1967
8	Mitch Mathews	73	2014
9	Dax Milne	70	2020
10	Chris Smith	68	1990

Single game
Rank	Player	Rec	Year	Opponent
1	Jay Miller	22	1973	New Mexico
2	Mitch Mathews	16	2014	Nevada
3	Phil Odle	14	1966	UTEP
3	Reno Mahe	14	2001	Hawaii
3	Puka Nacua	14	2022	Boise State

=== Receiving yards ===
Career
Rank	Player	Yards	Years
1	Cody Hoffman	3,612	2010 2011 2012 2013
2	Austin Collie	3,255	2004 2007 2008
3	Eric Drage	3,065	1990 1991 1992 1993
4	Dennis Pitta	2,901	2004 2007 2008 2009
5	Margin Hooks	2,841	1997 1998 1999 2000
6	Matt Bellini	2,635	1987 1988 1989 1990
7	Chase Roberts	2,586	2022 2023 2024 2025
8	Phil Odle	2,548	1965 1966 1967
9	Gordon Hudson	2,484	1981 1982 1983
10	Mark Bellini	2,429	1982 1983 1984 1985 1986

Single season
Rank	Player	Yards	Year
1	Austin Collie	1,538	2008
2	Cody Hoffman	1,248	2012
3	Andy Boyce	1,241	1990
4	Reno Mahe	1,211	2001
5	Dax Milne	1,188	2020
6	Jay Miller	1,181	1973
7	Chris Smith	1,156	1990
8	Eric Drage	1,093	1992
9	Chris Smith	1,090	1989
10	Dennis Pitta	1,083	2008

Single game
Rank	Player	Yards	Year	Opponent
1	Jay Miller	263	1973	New Mexico
2	Gordon Hudson	259	1981	Utah
3	Phil Odle	242	1966	UTEP
4	Glen Kozlowski	241	1985	Boston College
5	Andy Boyce	235	1990	New Mexico

=== Receiving touchdowns ===
Career
Rank	Player	TDs	Years
1	Cody Hoffman	33	2010 2011 2012 2013
2	Austin Collie	30	2004 2007 2008
3	Eric Drage	29	1990 1991 1992 1993
4	Phil Odle	25	1965 1966 1967
5	Mitch Mathews	24	2012 2013 2014 2015
5	Isaac Rex	24	2019 2020 2021 2022 2023
7	Glen Kozlowski	23	1981 1983 1984 1985
7	Mark Bellini	23	1982 1983 1984 1985 1986
9	Gordon Hudson	22	1981 1982 1983
10	Mike Chonsiter	21	2004 2007 2008 2009
10	Dennis Pitta	21	2004 2007 2008 2009

Single season
Rank	Player	TDs	Year
1	Clay Brown	15	1980
1	Austin Collie	15	2008
3	Mark Bellini	14	1985
4	Andy Boyce	13	1990
5	Eric Drage	12	1992
5	Jonny Harline	12	2006
5	Isaac Rex	12	2020

Single game
Rank	Player	TDs	Year	Opponent
1	Cody Hoffman	5	2012	New Mexico State
2	John VanderWouden	4	1976	Colorado State
2	Kirk Pendleton	4	1983	New Mexico
2	Luke Ashworth	4	2010	Colorado State

== Total offense ==
Total offense is the sum of passing and rushing statistics. It does not include receiving or returns.

=== Total offense yards ===
Career
Rank	Player	Yards	Years
1	Ty Detmer	14,665	1988 1989 1990 1991
2	Max Hall	11,569	2007 2008 2009
3	John Beck	11,059	2003 2004 2005 2006
4	Taysom Hill	9,742	2012 2013 2014 2015 2016
5	Jim McMahon	9,723	1977 1978 1980 1981
6	Steve Young	8,817	1980 1981 1982 1983
7	Robbie Bosco	8,299	1983 1984 1985
8	Zach Wilson	8,294	2018 2019 2020
9	John Walsh	7,736	1991 1992 1993 1994
10	Kevin Feterik	7,723	1996 1997 1998 1999

Single season
Rank	Player	Yards	Year
1	Ty Detmer	5,022	1990
2	Jim McMahon	4,627	1980
3	Ty Detmer	4,433	1989
4	Steve Young	4,346	1983
5	Taysom Hill	4,282	2013
6	Robbie Bosco	4,141	1985
7	Max Hall	4,072	2008
8	Brandon Doman	4,045	2001
9	Ty Detmer	4,001	1991
10	Steve Sarkisian	3,983	1996

Single game
Rank	Player	Yards	Year	Opponent
1	Ty Detmer	603	1991	San Diego State
2	Virgil Carter	599	1966	UTEP
3	John Walsh	597	1993	Utah State
4	Ty Detmer	594	1989	Penn State
5	Marc Wilson	582	1977	Utah

=== Touchdowns responsible for ===
"Touchdowns responsible for" is the official NCAA term for combined passing and rushing touchdowns.

Career
Rank	Player	TDs	Years
1	Ty Detmer	135	1988 1989 1990 1991
2	Max Hall	101	2007 2008 2009
3	Jim McMahon	94	1977 1978 1980 1981
4	John Beck	88	2003 2004 2005 2006
5	Taysom Hill	75	2012 2013 2014 2015 2016
6	Steve Young	74	1981 1982 1983
7	Zach Wilson	71	2018 2019 2020
8	Robbie Bosco	70	1983 1984 1985
9	Marc Wilson	69	1977 1978 1979
9	John Walsh	69	1991 1992 1993 1994

Single season
Rank	Player	TDs	Year
1	Jim McMahon	53	1980
2	Ty Detmer	45	1990
3	Zach Wilson	43	2020
4	Steve Young	41	1983
4	Brandon Doman	41	2001
6	Ty Detmer	39	1991
6	Max Hall	39	2008
8	John Beck	38	2006
8	Ty Detmer	38	1989
10	Robbie Bosco	35	1984
10	Max Hall	35	2009

Single game
Rank	Player	TDs	Year	Opponent
1	Marc Wilson	8	1977	Colorado State
1	Jim McMahon	8	1980	Utah State

== All-purpose yardage ==
All-purpose yardage is the sum of all yards credited to a player who is in possession of the ball. It includes rushing, receiving, and returns, but does not include passing.

BYU does not list a complete top 10 in all-purpose yardage over any time frame (career, season, game), only listing the top 5 for each. It also does not break down its leaders' performances by type of play.

Career
Rank	Player	Yards	Years
1	Cody Hoffman	5,015	2010 2011 2012 2013
2	Curtis Brown	4,996	2002 2004 2005 2006
3	Austin Collie	4,649	2004 2007 2008
4	Harvey Unga	4,540	2006 2007 2008 2009
5	Jamaal Williams	4,468	2012 2014 2015 2016

Single season
Rank	Player	Yards	Year
1	Austin Collie	2,112	2008
2	Luke Staley	2,004	2001
3	Harvey Unga	1,882	2007
4	Curtis Brown	1,864	2006
5	Pete Van Valkenburg	1,838	1972

Single game
Rank	Player	Yards	Year	Opponent
1	Austin Collie	366	2007	Tulsa
2	Pete Van Valkenburg	306	1972	Wyoming
3	Eldon Fortie	303	1962	George Washington
4	Luke Staley	300	2001	Utah State
5	Tyler Anderson	296	1993	Utah State

== Defense ==
=== Interceptions ===
Career
Rank	Player	Ints	Years
1	Dave Atkinson	20	1970 1971 1972 1973
2	Bobby Roberts	18	1965 1966 1967
	Dan Hansen	18	1969 1970 1971 1972
4	Derwin Gray	14	1989 1990 1991 1992
	Kai Nacua	14	2013 2014 2015 2016
6	Tom Holmoe	13	1978 1979 1980 1981 1982
	Brian Mitchell	13	1987 1988 1989 1990

Single season
Rank	Player	Ints	Year
1	Gene Frantz	9	1962
	Dave Atkinson	9	1971
3	Dan Hansen	8	1970
	Dave Atkinson	8	1972

=== Tackles ===
Career
Rank	Player	Tackles	Years
1	Shad Hansen	408	1989 1990 1991 1992
2	Rod Wood	394	1976 1977 1978
3	Larry Carr	389	1972 1973 1974
4	Glenn Redd	382	1978 1979 1980
5	Rocky Biegel	371	1988 1989 1990 1991

Single season
Rank	Player	Tackles	Year
1	Shad Hansen	193	1991
2	Rocky Biegel	192	1991
3	Rod Wood	157	1978
4	Sid Smith	149	1975
5	Glen Redd	148	1980
	Bob Davis	148	1988

Single game
Rank	Player	Tackles	Year	Opponent
1	Dan Hansen	25	1971	New Mexico
2	Derwin Gray	22	1991	Penn State
	Jared Lee	22	1999	Air Force
4	Dan Hansen	21	1970	Colorado State
5	Ted Nelson	20	1970	Arizona State

=== Sacks ===
Career
Rank	Player	Sacks	Years
1	Brandon Flint	33.0	1980 1981 1982 1983
2	Jan Jorgensen	30.0	2006 2007 2008 2009
3	Randy Brock	28.5	1991 1992 1993 1994
4	Mekeli Ieremia	27.0	1974 1975 1976 1977
5	Bronson Kaufusi	26.5	2012 2013 2014 2015
6	Jim Herrmann	26.0	1981 1983 1984
	Kyle Van Noy	26.0	2010 2011 2012 2013

Single season
Rank	Player	Sacks	Year
1	Mekeli Ieremia	17.0	1976
2	Jim Herrmann	16.0	1983
	Shawn Knights	16.0	1986
4	Stan Varner	14.0	1974
	Todd Shell	14.0	1983

Single game
Rank	Player	Sacks	Year	Opponent
1	Shay Muirbrook	6.0	1996	Kansas State
2	Kyle Whittingham	4.0	1986	San Diego State
	Jason Buck	4.0	1997	Oregon State
	Setema Gali	4.0	1999	New Mexico

== Kicking ==
=== Field goals made ===
Career
Rank	Player	FGs	Years
1	Owen Pochman	66	1997 1998 1999 2000
2	Will Ferrin	58	2023 2024 2025
3	Matt Payne	54	2001 2002 2003 2004
4	Jake Oldroyd	50	2016 2019 2020 2021 2022
5	Mitch Payne	47	2007 2008 2009 2010
6	Justin Sorensen	43	2008 2011 2012 2013
7	Leonard Chitty	34	1986 1987
8	Rhett Almond	30	2015 2016 2017
9	Jared McLaughlin	28	2005 2006
10	Kurt Gunther	27	1980 1981 1982

Single season
Rank	Player	FGs	Year
1	Will Ferrin	24	2024
2	Will Ferrin	23	2025
3	Justin Sorensen	21	2013
4	Ethan Pochman	20	1996
	Owen Pochman	20	1998
6	Owen Pochman	19	2000
7	Leonard Chitty	18	1987
	Owen Pochman	18	1999
9	Mitch Payne	17	2010
	Rhett Almond	17	2016

Single game
Rank	Player	FGs	Year	Opponent
1	Joe Liljenquist	5	1969	Colorado State
	Owen Pochman	5	1999	UNLV

=== Field goal percentage ===
Career
Rank	Player	FG%	Years
1	Trevor Samson	83.9%	2013 2014 2015
2	Will Ferrin	81.7%	2023 2024 2025
3	Jared McLaughlin	75.7%	2005 2006
4	Rhett Almond	75.0%	2015 2016 2017
5	Mitch Payne	74.6%	2007 2008 2009 2010
6	Matt Payne	74.0%	2001 2002 2003 2004
7	Jake Oldroyd	73.5%	2016 2019 2020 2021 2022
8	Owen Pochman	72.5%	1997 1998 1999 2000
9	Leonard Chitty	72.3%	1986 1987
10	Ethan Pochman	71.4%	1996

Single season
Rank	Player	FG%	Year
1	Jake Oldroyd	100.0%	2020
2	Will Ferrin	88.9%	2024
3	Trevor Samson	85.7%	2014
4	Trevor Samson	82.4%	2015
5	Matt Payne	81.3%	2002
6	Mitch Payne	81.0%	2010
	Rhett Almond	81.0%	2016
8	Justin Sorensen	80.8%	2013
9	Earl Kauffman	80.0%	1990
10	Owen Pochman	79.2%	2000
