= Kaufusi =

Kaufusi is a surname. Notable people with the surname include:

- Antonio Kaufusi (born 1984), Tongan rugby league footballer
- Bronson Kaufusi (born 1991), American football defensive end
- Corbin Kaufusi (born 1993), American football defensive end
- Felise Kaufusi (born 1992), New Zealand rugby league footballer
- Jason Kaufusi (born 1979), American football player
- Malupo Kaufusi (born 1979), Tongan rugby league footballer
- Michelle Kaufusi, American politician
- Oregon Kaufusi, New Zealand rugby league footballer
- Patrick Kaufusi (born 1994), Tongan rugby league footballer
- Steve Kaufusi (born 1963), American football defensive lineman
