= James Herman =

Jim or James, Herman or Herrmann may refer to:

- James G. Herman, American oncologist
- James P. Herman, American neuroscientist
- Jim Herman (born 1977), American golfer
- Jim Herrmann (born 1960), American football coach
- Jim Herrmann (defensive end) (born 1962), American football player
