= 2016 BYU Cougars football team =

American college football season

2016 BYU Cougars football

Poinsettia Bowl champion

Poinsettia Bowl, W 24–21 vs. Wyoming
- Conference: Independent
- Record: 9–4
- Head coach: Kalani Sitake (1st season)
- Offensive coordinator: Ty Detmer (1st season)
- Offensive scheme: Pro-style
- Defensive coordinator: Ilaisa Tuiaki (1st season)
- Base defense: 4–3
- Captains: Taysom Hill; Jamaal Williams; Kai Nacua; Harvey Langi
- Home stadium: LaVell Edwards Stadium

2016 NCAA Division I FBS independents football records
	Conf.			Overall
Team	W		L	W		L
BYU		–		9	–	4
Army		–		8	–	5
Notre Dame		–		4	–	8
UMass		–		2	–	10
Rankings from AP Poll

The 2016 BYU Cougars football team represented Brigham Young University in the 2016 NCAA Division I FBS football season. The Cougars, led by first-year head coach Kalani Sitake, played their home games at LaVell Edwards Stadium. This was the sixth year BYU competed as an NCAA Division I FBS independent. They finished the season 9–4. They were invited to the Poinsettia Bowl where they defeated Wyoming.

== Before the season ==
=== Coaching changes ===
BYU hired a new coaching staff in 2016. Gone from the program were Bronco Mendenhall, who accepted the Head coach position with the Virginia Cavaliers on December 4, and assistant coaches Robert Anae, Garett Tujague, Mark Atuaia, Jason Beck, Nick Howell, and Kelly Poppinga, who accepted positions on Virginia's new coaching staff.

On December 19, 2015, Kalani Sitake was announced as the new head coach. Sitake is the first Tongan to become a FBS collegiate football head coach.

On December 24, 2015, Ilaisa Tuiaki was appointed the defensive coordinator and Ty Detmer the offensive coordinator.

On December 26, 2015, Ed Lamb was appointed the assistant head coach.

In December 2015, Nu'u Tafisi was reported as being named as the strength and conditioning coach. On January 14, 2015, Tafisi was confirmed as a new member of the staff. Steve Kaufusi was also announced as a returning member of the staff, and former BYU offensive line coach Mike Empey, who served as offensive line coach under the legendary LaVell Edwards, was announced as a new staff member.

On January 20, 2016 Ben Cahoon was hired as the wide receivers coach.

On January 25, 2016, Steve Clark was hired as the tight end coach, Russell Tialavea was hired as the director of football operations, and AJ Middleton was hired as the asst. strength and conditioning coach.

On January 28, 2016, the final members of the coaching staff were hired. Reno Mahe was hired as the running backs coach, Jernaro Gilford was hired as the cornerbacks coach, and Tevita Ofahengaue was hired as the director of recruiting operations.

=== 2016 recruits ===
Name	Pos.	Height	Weight	Hometown
Kainoa Fuiava	DL	6'5"	295	Downey, CA
Alema Pilimai	TE	6'4"	205	Tustin, CA
Chris Wilcox	DB	6'2"	170	Corona, CA
Britton Hogan	DS	6'2"	205	Salt Lake City, UT
Keenan Pili	LB	6'2"	205	Provo, UT
Jake Oldroyd	K	6'1"	170	Southlake, TX
Jonah Trinnaman	WR	6'0"	190	Ephraim, UT Transfer from Snow College
Handsome Tanielu	DL	6'2"	300	Ephraim, UT Transfer from Snow College
Troy Warner	DB	6'2"	185	San Marcos, CA
Aleva Hifo	WR	5'10"	170	Menifee, CA
Hayden Livingston	QB	6'1"	185	Rigby, ID
Isaiah Armstrong	DB	6'2"	193	Redland, CA Transfer from Riverside City College
Keyan Norman	OL	6'3"	305	Cedar City, UT Transfer from Southern Utah University
Andrew Eide	OL	6'5"	301	Cedar City, UT Transfer from Southern Utah University
Solomone Wolfgramm	DL	6'5"	260	Laie, HI Transfer from BYU-Hawaii
Hunter Marshall	TE	6'3"	242	Ephraim, UT Transfer from Snow College

=== 2016 returning missionaries ===
Name	Pos.	Height	Weight	Year	Notes
Sam Baldwin	DB	6'3"	196	Freshman	
Austin Chambers	OL	6'4"	270	Freshman	
Zac Dawe	OL	6'4"	275	Freshman	
Kavika Fonua	LB	6'0"	220	Sophomore	
Rylee Gautavai	LB	6'1"	238	Freshman	
Kyle Griffitts	TE	6'3"	240	Freshman	
Mitch Harris	DS	6'4"	215	Freshman	
Chandon Herring	OL	6'7"	270	Freshman	
Tanner Jacobson	DB	5'10"	185	Sophomore	Transfer from Texas Tech
Isaiah Kaufusi	LB	6'2"	216	Freshman	
Taggart Krueger	WR	6'3"	190	Sophomore	
Hiva Lee	DB	5'8"	190	Sophomore	Transfer from Willamette
David Lowe	DL	6'2"	220	Freshman	Transfer from Southern Utah
Uriah Leiataua	DL	6'4"	240	Freshman	
Kieffer Longson	OL	6'7"	295	Freshman	
Inoke Lotulelei	WR	5'9"	190	Freshman	
Austin McChesney	DB	6'1"	190	Freshman	
Andrew Mikkelsen	K	6'0"	200	Sophomore	
Trajan Pili	LB	6'1"	225	Freshman	
Riggs Powell	DB	6'2"	205	Sophomore	Transfer from Cabrillo College
Addison Pulsipher	OL	6'5"	280	Freshman	
Mack Richards	WR	6'1"	190	Freshman	
Thomas Shoaf	OL	6'5"	275	Freshman	
Merrill Talialuli	DL	6'2"	305	Sophomore	
Beau Tanner	WR	6'0"	188	Sophomore	Transfer from Scottsdale Community College
Young Tanner	QB	6'0"	190	Sophomore	Transfer from Phoenix College
Johnny Tapusoa	LB	5'10"	225	Freshman	

=== 2016 departures ===
Name	Pos.	Height	Weight	Year	Notes
Roman Andrus	DL	6'4"	270	Freshman	Transferred to Snow College
Devon Blackmon	WR	6'0"	187	Senior	Graduation
Cody Bond	RB	5'8"	165	Junior	
Austin Brasher	K	6'0"	183	Junior	Graduation
Nate Carter	RB	5'9"	189	Senior	Graduation
Tyler Cook	LB	6'3"	230	Freshman	Medical
Demetrius Davis	OL	6'4"	294	Freshman	Transferred to Pima Community College
Nathan DeBeikes	LB	6'2"	207	Freshman	
Darren Denucci	OL	6'4"	317	Freshman	
Bryan Engstrom	RB	5'8"	172	Freshman	
B.J. Fifita	DB	6'0"	203	Freshman	
Travis Frey	WR	6'2"	177	Junior	Graduation
Jaterrius Gulley	OL	6'2"	346	Sophomore	Transferred to Alabama State
Kurt Henderson	WR	6'1"	190	Senior	Graduation
McCoy Hill	QB	6'6"	235	Sophomore	Transferred to Southern Utah
Adam Hine	RB	6'1"	216	Senior	Graduation
Toloa'i Ho Ching	RB	6'1"	241	Junior	Medical
Figgs Hofheins	OL	6'4"	280	Sophomore	
Terenn Houk	WR	6'5"	225	Senior	Graduation
Adam Ingersoll	DL	6'5"	262	Junior	
Ryan Jensen	LB	6'4"	216	Freshman	
Colby Jorgensen	TE	6'7"	228	Sophomore	Medical
Mitch Mathews	WR	6'6"	215	Senior	Graduation
Jackson Kaka	TE	6'4"	241	Sophomore	
Bronson Kaufusi	DL	6'8"	280	Senior	Graduation
Teu Kautai	LB	6'1"	228	Senior	Graduation
David Kessler	WR	6'2"	193	Junior	Graduation
Theodore King	TE	6'3"	265	Junior	Graduation
Elliot Knox	WR	6'4"	196	Junior	
Paul Langi	LB	6'1"	228	Freshman	
Jherremya Leuta-Doyere	LB	6'0"	230	Senior	Graduation
Ryker Mathews	OL	6'6"	322	Senior	Graduation
A.J. Moore	RB	5'10"	185	Junior	Graduation
Zach Newman	LB	6'3"	229	Sophomore	
Connor Noe	DB	6'2"	192	Freshman	
Taylor Parker	P	6'3"	193	Freshman	Transferred to Southern Utah
Remington Peck	TE	6'4"	270	Senior	Graduation
Manoa Pikula	LB	6'1"	235	Senior	Graduation
Jordan Preator	DB	6'0"	180	Sophomore	Transferred to Weber State
Brian Rawlinson	OL	6'7"	305	Junior	
Steven Richards	TE	6'3"	248	Freshman	Medical
Graham Rowley	DL	6'4"	280	Senior	Graduation
Bryan Sampson	TE	6'4"	245	Junior	Medical
Trevor Samson	K	5'11"	177	Senior	Graduation
Zachary Saunders	WR	5'11"	180	Freshman	
Sione Takitaki	LB	6'2"	250	Sophomore	Leave of Absence
Michael Wadsworth	DB	6'2"	221	Senior	Graduation
Jake Ziolkowski	WR	6'1"	200	Junior	
Josh Weeks	WR	6'4"	200	Freshman	Transferred to UTEP
Brad Wilcox	OL	6'7"	310	Junior	
Peter Welsh	RB	5'11"	205	Junior	
Felesi Tofi	DL	6'3"	280	Freshman	

== Media ==
=== Football Media Day ===
Football Media Day took place on June 30, 2016. It aired live on BYUtv, with a simulcast on ESPN3. On it Coach Sitake talked about future scheduling, Tom Holmoe discussed BYU's interest in the Big XII Conference, Coach Detmer talked about the switch to the Pro-style offense and how it will rely more on tight ends, and Coach Tuikai talked about the defensive scheme switching from 3–4 to 4–3. Throughout the day multiple players were also interviewed by Spencer Linton, Jarom Jordan, Lauren Francom, Jason Shepherd, Greg Wrubell, and various media members that covered BYU. Topics discussed during the interview included off-season workouts, marital status changes, the coaching changes, the QB controversy (Taysom Hill declared he could play that day if he was needed to), and many other topics. The day ended with a look back at the 1996 team that went 14–1 and won the Cotton Bowl.

During Media Day it was also revealed that Nike is working on a new shoe for Taysom Hill that gives additional support through the arch. It will also include the orthotics as an insole on top of that.

=== Cougar IMG Sports Network Affiliates ===
- KSL 102.7 FM and 1160 AM- Flagship Station (Salt Lake City/ Provo, UT, iHeartRadio and ksl.com)
- BYU Radio- Nationwide (Dish Network 980, Sirius XM 143, TuneIn radio, and byuradio.org)
- KIDO- Boise, ID (football only)
- KTHK- Blackfoot/ Idaho Falls/ Pocatello/ Rexburg, ID
- KMGR- Manti, UT
  KSUB- Cedar City, UT
- KDXU- St. George, UT
- KSHP- Las Vegas, NV (football only)

== Roster ==
2016 BYU Cougars football team roster
Players
Coaches
Offense

Pos.	#	Name	Class
QB	13	Koy Detmer Jr.	So
QB	7	Taysom Hill (injured) (C)	Sr
QB	4	Beau Hoge	So
QB	15	Hayden Livingston	Fr
QB	12	Tanner Mangum	So
QB	2	Young Tanner	So
OL	58	Austin Chambers	Fr
WR	1	Akile Davis	So
OL	54	Parker Dawe	Sr
OL	52	Zac Dawe	Fr
OL	79	Andrew Eide	Sr
OL	55	Quin Ficklin	So
TE	42	Kyle Griffitts	Fr
OL	77	Chandon Herring	Fr
OL	71	Austin Hoyt	So
OL	70	Jacob Jimenez	So
OL	67	Kyle Johnson	Sr
OL	78	Tuni Kanuch	Jr
OL	56	Tejan Koroma	So
OL	73	Ului Lapuaho	Jr
OL	74	Kieffer Longson	Fr
OL	76	Keyan Norman	Jr
OL	65	JJ Nwigwe	So
OL	72	Addison Pulsipher	Fr
OL	59	Thomas Shoaf	Fr
OL	57	LeRoy Sitake-Tanoai	Fr
RB	24	Algie Brown	Sr
RB	34	Riley Burt	So
RB	22	Squally Canada	So
RB	6	Trey Dye	Jr
RB	35	Brayden El-Bakri	So
RB	20	KJ Hall	Fr
RB	30	Colby Hansen	Jr
RB	46	Creed Richardson	So
RB	21	Jamaal Williams (C)	Sr
TE	89	Tanner Balderree	Jr
TE	44	Troy Hinds	So
TE	96	Hunter Marshall	So
TE	45	Alema Pilimai	Fr
TE	85	Nate Sampson	So
TE	95	Cody Savage	Fr
TE	95	David Weekes	So
WR	88	Aleva Hifo	Fr
WR	23	Garrett Juergens	Sr
WR	87	Mitchell Juergens	Sr
WR	5	Nick Kurtz	Sr
WR	25	Taggart Krueger	So
WR	1	Moroni Laulu-Pututau	So
WR	83	Inoke Lotulelei	Fr
WR	3	Colby Pearson	Sr
WR	86	Mack Richards	Fr
WR	27	Rickey Shumway	Fr
WR	82	Talon Shumway	Fr
WR	19	Micah Simon	So
WR	80	Beau Tanner	So
WR	84	Jonah Trinnaman	Jr

Defense

Pos.	#	Name	Class
DB	24	Zayne Anderson	So
DB	3	Isaiah Armstrong	So
DB	17	Chris Badger	Sr
DB	45	Sam Baldwin	Fr
DB	19	Trevor Brent	Fr
DB	15	Michael Davis	Sr
DB	36	Caden Dortch	Fr
DB	16	Gavin Fowler (injured)	Jr
DB	10	Kamel Greene	Jr
DB	2	Matt Hadley	Jr
DB	7	Micah Hannemann	Jr
DB	25	Tanner Jacobson	So
DB	53	Isaiah Kaufusi	Fr
DB	5	Dayan Ghanwoloku	Fr
DB	22	Hiva Lee	Fr
DB	27	Austin McChesney (injured)	Fr
DB	12	Kai Nacua (C)	Sr
DB	34	Riggs Powell	So
DB	28	Sawyer Powell	Jr
DB	18	Michael Shelton	So
DB	29	Cody Stewart	Jr
DB	33	Eric Takenaka	Sr
DB	11	Troy Warner	Fr
DB	32	Chris Wilcox	Fr
DL	93	Kainoa Fuiava	Fr
DL	90	Corbin Kaufusi	Jr
DL	76	Kamalani Kaluhiokalani	So
DL	49	Moses Kaumatule	So
LB	21	Harvey Langi (C)	Sr
DL	48	Tomasi Laulile	Jr
DL	58	Uriah Leiataua	Fr
DL	97	Maurice Maxwell	Sr
DL	50	Tevita Mo'Unga	So
DL	98	Trajan Pili	Fr
DL	62	Logan Taele	Sr
DL	97	David Low	Fr
DL	54	Merrill Taliauli (injured)	So
DL	92	Handsome Tanielu	Jr
DL	94	Kesni Tausinga	Jr
DL	91	Travis Tuiloma (injured)	Sr
DL	99	Solomone Wolfgramm	So
LB	22	Phillip Amone (injured)	So
LB	13	Francis Bernard	So
LB	30	Kavika Fonua	So
LB	43	Rylee Gautavai	Fr
LB	42	Austin Heder	Sr
LB	47	Scott Huntsman	So
LB	37	Grant Jones	Jr
LB	51	Lene Lesatele	Jr
LB	52	Sam Morell	Fr
LB	35	Va'a Nuimatalolo	Jr
LB	38	Butch Pau'u	So
LB	44	Keenan Pili	Fr
LB	41	Adam Pulsipher	So
DL	46	Rhett Sandlin	So
LB	43	Johnny Tapusoa	Fr
LB	31	Sae Tautu	Sr
LB	51	Morgan Unga	So
LB	4	Fred Warner	Jr

Special teams

Pos.	#	Name	Class
DS	64	Matt Foley	So
DS	52	Mitch Harris	Fr
DS	60	Britton Hogan	Fr
K/P	26	Rhett Almond	So
K	16	Corey Edwards	So
K	83	Andrew Mikkelsen	So
K/P	39	Jake Oldroyd	Fr
P	31	Jonny Linehan	Jr

Head coach

- Kalani Sitake (BYU)

Coordinators/assistant coaches

- Ed Lamb (BYU)
  Assistant head coach, safeties, special teams
- Ty Detmer (BYU)
  Offensive coordinator, quarterbacks
- Mike Empey (BYU)
  Offensive line
- Reno Mahe (BYU)
  Running backs
- Ben Cahoon (BYU)
  Wide receivers
- Steve Clark (BYU)
  Tight ends
- Ilaisa Tuiaki (Southern Utah)
  Defensive coordinator, linebackers
- Steve Kaufusi (BYU)
  Defensive line
- Jernaro Gilford (BYU)
  Cornerbacks
- Nu'u Tafisi (California)
  Strength and conditioning
- AJ Middleton (Redlands)
  Asst. strength and conditioning
- Russell Tialevea (BYU)
  Director of football operations
- Tevita Ofahengaue (BYU)
  Director of recruiting operations
- Jack Damuni (BYU)
  Director of player personnel
- Jasen Ah You (BYU)
  Director of athletic relations
- Sione Kinikini (Western Governors)
  Director of player development
- JD Falslev (BYU)
  Offensive graduate assistant
- Jan Jorgensen (BYU)
  Defensive graduate assistant
- Vince Feula (BYU)
  Defensive graduate assistant
- Harvey Unga (BYU)
  Offensive graduate assistant

Legend

- (C) Team captain
- (S) Suspended
- (I) Ineligible
- Injured
- Redshirt

Roster

== Schedule ==
The 2016 schedule was believed to be BYU's hardest schedule to date. It featured Power 5 teams from the Pac-12, Big Ten, Big 12, and SEC along with teams that have normally been ranked from the Group of 5 schools. However, at the end of the 2016 season it appeared noticeably weaker than previously predicted, with Sagarin ranking the schedule 75th.

Date	Time	Opponent	Site	TV	Result	Attendance
September 3	8:30 p.m.	vs. Arizona	University of Phoenix Stadium; Glendale, AZ (Cactus Kickoff)	FS1	W 18–16	50,528
September 10	5:30 p.m.	at Utah	Rice-Eccles Stadium; Salt Lake City, UT (Holy War & Beehive Boot)	FOX	L 19–20	46,915
September 17	8:15 p.m.	UCLA	LaVell Edwards Stadium; Provo, UT	ESPN2	L 14–17	62,904
September 24	1:30 p.m.	vs. West Virginia	FedExField; Landover, MD	ESPN2	L 32–35	38,207
September 30	8:15 p.m.	Toledo	LaVell Edwards Stadium; Provo, UT	ESPN2	W 55–53	62,230
October 8	1:30 p.m.	at Michigan State	Spartan Stadium; East Lansing, MI	ABC/ESPN2	W 31–14	74,214
October 14	8:15 p.m.	Mississippi State^{†}	LaVell Edwards Stadium; Provo, UT	ESPN	W 28–21 ^{2OT}	62,184
October 20	8:15 p.m.	at No. 14 Boise State	Albertsons Stadium; Boise, ID	ESPN	L 27–28	34,575
November 5	1:30 p.m.	at Cincinnati	Nippert Stadium; Cincinnati, OH	CBSSN	W 20–3	37,522
November 12	1:00 p.m.	Southern Utah	LaVell Edwards Stadium; Provo, UT	BYUtv/ESPN3	W 37–7	59,302
November 19	12:00 p.m.	UMass	LaVell Edwards Stadium; Provo, UT	BYUtv/ESPN3	W 51–9	51,190
November 26	8:15 p.m.	Utah State	LaVell Edwards Stadium; Provo, UT (Beehive Boot & The Old Wagon Wheel)	ESPNU	W 28–10	53,603
December 21	7:00 p.m.	vs. Wyoming	Qualcomm Stadium; San Diego, CA (Poinsettia Bowl)	ESPN	W 24–21	28,114
^{†}Homecoming; Rankings from AP Poll / Coaches' Poll released prior to game; All times are in Mountain time

== Game summaries ==
=== Arizona ===
BYU vs. Arizona

Team	1	2	3	4	Total
• Cougars	0	9	0	9	18
Wildcats	0	0	3	13	16

- Date: September 3
- Location: University of Phoenix Stadium
  Glendale, AZ
- Game start: 7:45 p.m. MST
- Elapsed time: 3:18
- Game attendance: 50,528
- Game weather: Indoors
- Referee: Kevin Mar • Umpire: Matt Salas • Linesman: John Braun • Line judge: Darren Deckard • Back judge: Dave Baldwin • Field judge: Kirk Wisniewski • Side judge: Mario Seneca • Center judge: Corey Long
- TV announcers (FS1/SUSA): Joe Davis, Brady Quinn, Jenny Taft (FS1)
  John Ahlers, Doug Plank (SUSA)

Uniform combination: white helmet, white jersey, white pants.

The Cougar offense and defense dominated for three quarters of the game, but it took a 33-yard field goal from freshman kicker Jake Oldroyd for BYU to prevail 18–16 and give Kalani Sitake his first win as Cougar head coach.

Oldroyd originally wasn't scheduled to be on the road roster. A late Thursday move moved Oldroyd past James Baird on the depth chart and onto the roster. After sophomore kicker Rhett Almond missed the extra point, BYU decided to make the move to Oldroyd showing the kicking battle still hasn't been settled for the Cougars this season.

In his return to the Cougars Jamaal Williams had a fine game, rushing for 162 yards on 29 carries, an average of 5.2 yards per carry, and winning BYUtv's Y-Factor award. Williams would also catch one pass for 10 yards. It was Taysom Hill though who carried much of the team.

Hill threw for 202 yards, a touchdown, and no interceptions. After BYU fell behind 16–15, Hill took possession of the ball at the 20. He scrambled twice for a first down and went 3-for-3 passing on the series. Overall Hill would carry the ball for 37 yards and four first downs.

A late illegal procedure penalty with :08 seconds left nearly cost the Cougars, but BYU chose to use their final timeout and avoid the 10-second runoff. The ball had been moved from BYU's 20 to Arizona's 16, but the loss of the timeout forced Oldroyd to kick from the left hash instead of dead center. After a failed freeze by Rich Rodriguez, Oldroyd nailed the kick right down the center to give BYU the lead back and ultimately the win.

Scoring summary

Quarter	Time	Drive			Team	Scoring information	Score	
Quarter	Time	Plays	Yards	TOP	Team	Scoring information	BYU	ARIZ
2	10:42	8	45	3:02	BYU	24-yard field goal by Rhett Almond	3	0
2	2:53	11	65	5:53	BYU	Brayden Al-Bakri 1-yard touchdown run, Rhett Almond kick failed	9	0
3	5:59	9	69	3:39	ARIZ	46-yard field goal by Josh Pollack	9	3
4	11:36	10	80	4:30	BYU	Colby Pearson 6-yard touchdown reception from Taysom Hill, 2-point pass failed	15	3
4	9:33	7	75	2:03	ARIZ	Nick Wilson 15-yard touchdown run, Josh Pollack kick good	15	10
4	1:26	4	80	1:38	ARIZ	Nick Wilson 49-yard touchdown run, 2-point pass intercepted by Butch Pau'u	15	16
4	0:04	9	53	1:16	BYU	33-yard field goal by Jake Oldroyd	18	16
"TOP" = time of possession. For other American football terms, see Glossary of American football.							18	16

Game Stats:

- Passing: BYU: Taysom Hill 21–29–0—202; Arizona: Anu Solomon 20–30–2—213.
- Rushing: BYU: Jamaal Williams 29–162, Hill 11–37, Algernon Brown 3–7, Squally Canada 2–6, Brayden Al-Bakri 1–1; Arizona: Nick Wilson 17–138, Orlando Bradford 1–1, J.J. Taylor 1-(−4), Solomon 7-(−20).
- Receiving: BYU: Jonah Trinnaman 6–49, Moroni Laulu-Pututau 4–49, Colby Pearson 4–37, Hunter Marshall 2–29, Brown 1–14, Williams 1–10, Nick Kurtz 1–9, Tanner Balderdee 2–5; Arizona: Nate Phillips 7–69, Trey Griffey 4–66, Tyrell Johnson 2–28, Shawn Poindexter 1–19, Samajie Grant 3–14, Wilson 2–11, Josh Kern 1–6.
- Interceptions: BYU: Kai Nacua 1–1, Francis Bernard 1–0.

=== Utah ===
BYU at Utah

Team	1	2	3	4	Total
Cougars	6	7	0	6	19
• Utes	7	7	3	3	20

- Date: September 10
- Location: Rice-Eccles Stadium
  Salt Lake City, UT
- Game start: 5:36 MDT
- Elapsed time: 3:47
- Game attendance: 46,915
- Game weather: 80 °F (27 °C), Sunny, winds WSW 7 mph
- Referee: Brad Van Vark • Umpire: Michael Cooper • Linesman: George Gusman • Line judge: Frank LeBlanc • Back judge: Brian Ernest • Field judge: Jason Ledet • Side judge: Gene Semko • Center judge: Brian Alos
- TV announcers (FOX): Gus Johnson, Joel Klatt, Shannon Spake

Uniform combination: white helmet with royal blue decals and royal blue chromium facemasks, royal blue jersey, white pants Turnovers plagued both teams. A pick six on the first play of the game put BYU behind the eight ball and made many people fear it would be the Las Vegas Bowl all over again. BYU rebounded from the pick six though, forcing 6 turnovers (3 interceptions, 2 fumbles, and a muffed punt). The turnovers led directly to 13 of BYU's points.

However a hard hit caused Jamaal Williams to sit most of the fourth quarter, and two questionable targeting calls ejected two of BYU's top defenders, one of which was captain Kai Nacua (the referee couldn't initially get his number right, first saying 32 and 13 before finally correctly saying 12) who had intercepted two passes to that point; Austin McChesney was ejected for targeting as Francis Bernard (the actual number 13) came down with the third pick.

Even with all the questionable calls and forced turnovers, both BYU and Utah found they had ample opportunities to score that they didn't capitalize on. A failed two-point conversion attempt was followed by a failed onside kick attempt and ultimately cost BYU the game.

One game after limiting his rushing, Taysom Hill rushed was 87 yards and 2 touchdowns. BYU now prepares for their home opener against UCLA with a +5 turnover margin. Whether the offense can some of the turnovers into touchdowns though is a tossup.

Scoring summary

Quarter	Time	Drive			Team	Scoring information	Score	
Quarter	Time	Plays	Yards	TOP	Team	Scoring information	BYU	Utah
1	14:44				Utah	Interception returned 41 yards for touchdown by Sunia Tauteoli, Andy Phillips kick good	0	7
1	9:44	8	3	3:17	BYU	43-yard field goal by Jake Oldroyd	3	7
1	5:04	8	12	2:53	BYU	42-yard field goal by Jake Oldroyd	6	7
2	4:06	5	80	2:06	BYU	Taysom Hill 39-yard touchdown run, Jake Oldroyd kick good	13	7
2	0:17	10	72	3:41	Utah	Tim Patrick 21-yard touchdown reception from Troy Williams, Andy Phillips kick good	13	14
3	7:53	5	42	1:48	Utah	47-yard field goal by Andy Phillips	13	17
4	2:47	19	78	11:21	Utah	29-yard field goal by Andy Phillips	13	20
4	0:18	13	75	2:29	BYU	Taysom Hill 7-yard touchdown run, 2-point run failed	19	20
"TOP" = time of possession. For other American football terms, see Glossary of American football.							19	20

Game Stats:

- Passing: BYU: Taysom Hill 21–39–3—176, Mitch Juergens 1–1–0—9, Team 0–1–0—0; Utah: Troy Williams 14–23–3—194.
- Rushing: BYU: Hill 13–87, Jamaal Williams 12–58, Brayden El-Bakri 1–1, Algernon Brown 1-(−3); Utah: Troy McCormick 10–62, Zack Moss 12–58, Joe Williams 10–26, Troy Williams 7–13, Kyle Fulks 2–11, Team 1-(−1).
- Receiving: BYU: Juergens 8–52, Nick Kurtz 3–35, Moroni Laulu-Pututau 3–31, Jonah Trinnaman 2–27, Colby Pearson 2–10, Williams 1–10, Corbin Kaufusi 1–9, Aleva Hifo 1–7, Ului Lapuaho 1–4; Utah: Tyrone Smith 2–60, Tim Patrick 3–59, Rae Singleton 2–23, Evan Moeai 2–21, Harris Handley 2–21, Demari Simpkins 2–6, Joe Williams 1–4.
- Interceptions: BYU: Kai Nacua 2–0, Francis Bernard 1–0; Utah: Sunia Tauteoli 2–41, Reginald Porter 1–1.

=== UCLA ===
UCLA at BYU

Team	1	2	3	4	Total
• Bruins	0	10	7	0	17
Cougars	0	0	7	7	14

- Date: September 17
- Location: LaVell Edwards Stadium
  Provo, UT
- Game start: 8:26 p.m. MDT
- Elapsed time: 3:27
- Game attendance: 62,904
- Game weather: 65 °F (18 °C), Partly cloudy, winds calm
- Referee: Eddy Shelton • Umpire: Rick Podraza • Linesman: Rick Smith • Line judge: Scott Reilly • Back judge: Terry White • Field judge: Nick Lave • Side judge: Richard Corona • Center judge: Mike Cuttone
- TV announcers (ESPN2/BYUtv): Allen Bestwick, Mike Bellotti, Kris Budden (ESPN2)
  Dave McCann, Blaine Fowler, Lauren Francom (BYUtv)

Uniform combination: White helmet, blue jersey, white pants

Scoring summary

Quarter	Time	Drive			Team	Scoring information	Score	
Quarter	Time	Plays	Yards	TOP	Team	Scoring information	UCLA	BYU
2	12:50	12	80	5:41	UCLA	Cameron Griffin 6-yard touchdown reception from Josh Rosen, JJ Molsen kick good	7	0
2	5:04	6	32	1:54	UCLA	24-yard field goal by JJ Molsen	10	0
3	7:24	10	76	4:16	UCLA	Darren Andrews 33-yard touchdown reception from Josh Rosen, JJ Molsen kick good	17	0
3	3:07	10	75	4:17	BYU	Jamaal Williams 1-yard touchdown run, Rhett Almond kick good	17	7
4	0:37	9	91	1:39	BYU	Nick Kurtz 23-yard touchdown reception from Taysom Hill, Rhett Almond kick good	17	14
"TOP" = time of possession. For other American football terms, see Glossary of American football.							17	14

Game Stats:

- Passing: UCLA: Josh Rosen 26–40–1—307; BYU: Taysom Hill 26–48–1—250
- Rushing: UCLA: Nate Starks 15–39, Bolu Olorunfunmi 8–15, Brandon Stephens 5–4, Ishmael Adams 1–1, Jalen Starks 2–1, Team 2-(−2), Rosen 1-(−8); BYU: Jamaal Williams 14–28, Squally Canada 1–2, Hill 10-(−7).
- Receiving: UCLA: Darren Andrews 4–91, Nate Iese 2–34, Adams 2–27, Mossi Johnson 2–26, Kenneth Walker III 2–25, Jordan Lasley 4–21, Cameron Griffin 2–18, Nate Starks 3–16, Alex Van Dyke 1–7, Caleb Wilson 1–5, Austin Roberts 1–5; BYU: Nick Kurtz 8–83, Moroni Laulu-Pututau 6–51, Williams 2–45, Colby Pearson 3–27, Hunter Marshall 1–16, Jonah Trinnaman 3–12, Mitch Juergens 1–10, Garrett Juergens 1–6, Aleva Hifo 1–0.
- Interceptions: UCLA: Adarius Pickett 1–0; BYU: Fred Warner 1–0.

=== West Virginia ===
BYU vs. West Virginia

Team	1	2	3	4	Total
Cougars	7	6	6	13	32
• Mountaineers	7	14	7	7	35

- Date: September 24
- Location: FedExField
  Landover, MD
- Game start: 3:30 p.m. EDT
- Elapsed time: 3:32
- Game attendance: 38,207
- Game weather: 65 °F (18 °C), Partly cloudy, winds calm
- Referee: Matt Austin • Umpire: Rodney Lawary • Linesman: Chris Barney • Line judge: Darren Crawford • Back judge: John Wright • Field judge: P. Davenport • Side judge: Chris Conley • Center judge: Teiresias Jones
- TV announcers (ESPN2): Jason Benetti, Kelly Stouffer, Paul Carcaterra

Uniform combination: white helmet, white jersey, blue pants.

Scoring summary

Quarter	Time	Drive			Team	Scoring information	Score	
Quarter	Time	Plays	Yards	TOP	Team	Scoring information	BYU	WVU
1	9:22	13	88	5:38	WVU	Rushel Shell 6-yard touchdown run, Mike Molina kick good	0	7
1	2:44	12	78	6:33	BYU	Mitch Juergens 23-yard touchdown reception from Taysom Hill, Rhett Almond kick good	7	7
2	14:17	5	55	1:39	BYU	22-yard field goal by Rhett Almond	10	7
2	9:50	12	86	4:27	WVU	Rushel Shell 2-yard touchdown run, Mike Molina kick good	10	14
2	2:23				WVU	Interception returned 54 yards for touchdown by Rasul Douglas, Mike Molina kick good	10	21
2	0:00	10	43	2:14	BYU	25-yard field goal by Rhett Almond	13	21
3	10:44	8	57	4:08	BYU	Jamaal Williams 7-yard touchdown run, 2-point pass failed	19	21
3	2:32	4	59	1:30	WVU	Skyler Howard 5-yard touchdown run, Mike Molina kick good	19	28
4	11:27	12	99	4:18	WVU	Daikiel Shorts 9-yard touchdown reception from Skyler Howard, Mike Molina kick good	19	35
4	9:19	8	67	2:01	BYU	Jamaal Williams 3-yard touchdown run, 2-point pass from Mitch Juergens intercepted	25	35
4	5:55	9	79	2:01	BYU	Moroni Laulu-Pututau 18-yard touchdown reception from Taysom Hill, Rhett Almond kick good	32	35
"TOP" = time of possession. For other American football terms, see Glossary of American football.							32	35

Game Stats:

- Passing: BYU: Taysom Hill 23–35–3—241, Team 0–1–0—0; WVU: Skyler Howard 31–40–1—332.
- Rushing: BYU: Jamaal Williams 24–169, Hill 13–101, Squally Canada 2–6, Micah Hanneman 1–4; WVU: Justin Crawford 9–86, Rushel Shell 11–35, Howard 11–27, Kennedy McKoy 1–5, Tyler Orlosky 1-(−2), Team 2-(−2).
- Receiving: BYU: Nick Kurtz 6–78, Colby Pearson 4–55, Mitch Juergens 5–50, Aleva Hifo 4–26, Morono Laulu-Pututau 2–21, Williams 2–11; WVU: Shelton Gibson 4–144, Ka'Raun White 4–39, Crawford 3–36, Jovon Durante 6–32, Daikiel Shorts 5–22, Shell 4–22, Devonte Mathis 1–13, Kennedy McCoy 2–11, Gary Jennings 1–9, Elijah Wellman 1–4.
- Interceptions: BYU: Butch Pau'u 1–20; WVU: Rasul Douglas 1–54, Maurice Fleming 1–2, Jeremy Tyler 1–0.

=== Toledo ===
Toledo at BYU

Team	1	2	3	4	Total
Rockets	14	7	17	15	53
• Cougars	21	0	14	20	55

- Date: September 30
- Location: LaVell Edwards Stadium
  Provo, UT
- Game start: 8:26 p.m. MDT
- Elapsed time: 3:39
- Game attendance: 62,230
- Game weather: 66 °F (19 °C), winds 6 mph ESE
- Referee: Larry Smith • Umpire: John Hanneke • Linesman: Daniel Richard • Line judge: Kole Knueppel • Back judge: Tho Riepenhoff • Field judge: Kyle DeBue • Side judge: Matt Kukar • Center judge: Ron Kay
- TV announcers (ESPN2/BYUtv): Adam Amin, Mack Brown, Molly McGrath (ESPN2)
  Dave McCann, Blaine Fowler, Lauren Francom (BYUtv)

Uniform combination: white helmet, white jersey, white pants.

Scoring summary

Quarter	Time	Drive			Team	Scoring information	Score	
Quarter	Time	Plays	Yards	TOP	Team	Scoring information	TOL	BYU
1	14:49	1	75	0:11	BYU	Jonah Trinnaman 75-yard touchdown reception from Taysom Hill, Rhett Almond kick good	0	7
1	12:23	7	75	2:26	TOL	Terry Swanson 8-yard touchdown run, Jameson Vest kick good	7	7
1	4:24	7	72	3:00	BYU	Jamaal Williams 1-yard touchdown run, Rhett Almond kick good	7	14
1	0:47	2	13	0:31	BYU	Jamaal Williams 2-yard touchdown run, Rhett Almond kick good	7	21
1	0:31	1	79	0:13	TOL	Jon'Vea Johnson 79-yard touchdown reception from Logan Woodside, Jameson Vest kick good	14	21
2	7:45	9	61	3:18	TOL	Corey Jones 26-yard touchdown reception from Logan Woodside, Jameson Vest kick good	21	21
3	11:02	9	83	3:50	TOL	Jon'Vea Johnson 12-yard touchdown reception from Logan Woodside, Jameson Vest kick good	28	21
3	10:18	2	72	0:38	BYU	Jamaal Williams 48-yard touchdown run, Rhett Almond kick good	28	28
3	8:17	5	64	2:01	TOL	28-yard field goal by Jameson Vest	31	28
3	5:01	6	86	3:08	BYU	Jamaal Williams 62-yard touchdown run, Rhett Almond kick good	31	35
3	0:58	9	83	3:56	TOL	Jon'Vea Johnson 15-yard touchdown reception from Logan Woodside, Jameson Vest kick good	38	35
4	13:20	6	79	2:32	BYU	Sqally Canada 17-yard touchdown run, Rhett Almond kick good	38	42
4	10:57	5	90	2:18	TOL	Cody Thompson 78-yard touchdown reception from Logan Woodside, Jameson Vest kick good	45	42
4	5:21	11	70	5:30	BYU	32-yard field goal by Rhett Almond	45	45
4	3:00	3	21	1:29	BYU	Jamaal Williams 14-yard touchdown run, Rhett Almond kick good	45	52
4	1:11	8	79	1:43	TOL	Kareem Hunt 7-yard touchdown run, 2-point pass from Michael Roberts good	53	52
4	0:00	8	71	1:06	BYU	19-yard field goal by Rhett Almond	53	55
"TOP" = time of possession. For other American football terms, see Glossary of American football.							53	55

Game Stats:

- Passing: TOL: Logan Woodside 30–38–2—505; BYU: Taysom Hill 11–21–0—248.
- Rushing: TOL: Kareem Hunt 27–146, Terry Swanson 10–45, Damion Jones-Moore 1–1, Woodside 3-(−5); BYU: Jamaal Williams 30–286, Squally Canada 9–49, Hill 6–3.
- Receiving: TOL: Jon'Vea Johnson 9–182, Cody Thompson 5–161, Corey Jones 6–56, Hunt 4–49, Michael Roberts 4–36, Swanson 1–11, Darryl Richards 1–10; BYU: Jonah Trinnaman 1–75, Tanner Balderree 3–62, Colby Pearson 2–41, Algernon Brown 2–37, Brayden El-Bakri 1–19, Aleva Hifo 2–14.
- Interceptions: BYU: Dayan Lake 1–49, Kai Nacua 1–20.

=== Michigan State ===
BYU at Michigan State

Team	1	2	3	4	Total
• Cougars	0	3	7	21	31
Spartans	7	0	0	7	14

- Date: October 8
- Location: Spartan Stadium
  East Lansing, MI
- Game start: 3:36 p.m. EDT
- Elapsed time: 3:25
- Game attendance: 74,214
- Game weather: 57 °F (14 °C), Sunny, winds 16 mph WNW
- Referee: Mike Defee • Umpire: Robert Richeson • Linesman: Al Green • Line judge: Derek Anderson • Back judge: Terry Jones • Field judge: Joe Blubaugh • Side judge: Lo van Pham • Center judge: Mike Contreraz
- TV announcers (ABC/ESPN2): Mike Patrick, Ed Cunningham, Dr. Jerry Punch

Uniform combination: white helmet, white jersey, blue pants.

Scoring summary

Quarter	Time	Drive			Team	Scoring information	Score	
Quarter	Time	Plays	Yards	TOP	Team	Scoring information	BYU	MSU
1	4:10	15	72	7:03	MSU	Gerald Holmes 8-yard touchdown run, Michael Geiger kick good	0	7
2	0:00	11	31	2:30	BYU	35-yard field goal by Rhett Almond	3	7
3	4:52	13	73	7:29	BYU	Colby Pearson 4-yard touchdown reception from Taysom Hill, Rhett Almond kick good	10	7
4	12:43	13	70	5:48	BYU	Taysom Hill 12-yard touchdown run, Rhett Almond kick good	17	7
4	12:43	3	32	1:29	BYU	Jamaal Williams 8-yard touchdown run, Rhett Almond kick good	24	7
4	4:59	10	75	2:54	MSU	Damion Terry 1-yard touchdown run, Michael Geiger kick good	24	14
4	1:59	8	82	2:55	BYU	Jamaal Williams 1-yard touchdown run, Rhett Almond kick good	31	14
"TOP" = time of possession. For other American football terms, see Glossary of American football.							31	14

Game Stats:

- Passing: BYU: Taysom Hill 18–27–0—138; MSU: Damion Terry 6–10–1—63, Tyler O'Connor 7–11–0—58.
- Rushing: BYU: Jamaal Williams 30–163, Squally Canada 6–50, Hill 8–47, Colby Pearson 1–3, Algernon Brown 2–1, Team 2-(−4); MSU: Gerald Holmes 15–57, Terry 8–29, LJ Scott 3–9, Madre London 1–4, RJ Shelton 1–2, O'Connor 3-(−7), Team 1-(−9).
- Receiving: BYU: Jonah Trinnaman 6–55, Nick Kurtz 3–27, Mitch Juergens 2–24, Pearson 3–15, Hunter Marshall 1–6, Brown 1–5, Williams 1–4, Quin Ficklin 1–2; MSU: Josiah Price 2–29, Felton Davis 1–28, Holmes 4–22, RJ Shelton 3–18, Donnie Corley 2–13, Jamal Lyles 1–11.
- Interceptions: BYU: Michael Davis 1–40.

=== Mississippi State ===
Mississippi State at BYU

Team	1	2	3	4	OT	2OT	Total
Bulldogs	7	7	0	0	7	0	21
• Cougars	7	0	0	7	7	7	28

- Date: October 14
- Location: LaVell Edwards Stadium
  Provo, UT
- Game start: 8:21 p.m. MDT
- Elapsed time: 3:47
- Game attendance: 62,184
- Game weather: 69 °F (21 °C), Cloudy, winds 12 mph SSE
- Referee: Hubert Owens • Umpire: Walt Hill • Linesman: Chad Green • Line judge: Chuck Rice • Back judge: Martin Hankins • Field judge: Greg Thomas • Side judge: Chad Hill • Center judge: Steve Marlowe
- TV announcers (ESPN/BYUtv): Tom Hart, Andre Ware, Cole Cubelic (ESPN)
  Dave McCann, Blaine Fowler, Lauren Francom (BYUtv)

Uniform combination: white helmet with royal blue decals and royal blue chromium facemasks, royal blue jersey, white pants.

Scoring summary

Quarter	Time	Drive			Team	Scoring information	Score	
Quarter	Time	Plays	Yards	TOP	Team	Scoring information	MSU	BYU
1	9:13	6	60	1:24	MSU	Keith Mixon 44-yard touchdown reception from Nick Fitzgerald, Westin Graves kick good	7	0
1	0:48	15	75	8:25	BYU	Hunter Marshall 1-yard touchdown reception from Taysom Hill, Rhett Almond kick good	7	7
2	3:54	14	75	5:44	MSU	Nick Fitzgerald 1-yard touchdown run, Westin Graves kick good	14	7
4	13:15	12	48	5:01	BYU	Moroni Laulu-Pututau 15-yard touchdown reception from Taysom Hill, Andrew Mikkelsen kick good	14	14
OT		4	25		MSU	Nick Fitzgerald 2-yard touchdown run, Westin Graves kick good	21	14
OT		7	25		BYU	Taysom Hill 1-yard touchdown run, Andrew Mikkelsen kick good	21	21
2OT		1	25		BYU	Tanner Balderdee 25-yard touchdown reception from Taysom Hill, Rhett Almond kick good	21	28
"TOP" = time of possession. For other American football terms, see Glossary of American football.							21	28

Game Stats:

- Passing: MSU: Nick Fitzgerald 17–36–2—214, Fred Ross 1–1–0—9; BYU: Taysom Hill 16–28–1—165.
- Rushing: MSU: Aeris Williams 21–82, Nick Fitzgerald 16–41, Malik Dear 3–17, Keith Mixon 3–13, Ashton Shumpert 6–10; BYU: Jamaal Williams 26–76, Hill 17–53, Squally Canada 3–11, Tanner Balderdee 0–7, Team 1-(−1).
- Receiving: MSU: Fred Ross 5–69, Keith Mixon 4–69, Dear 3–36, Donald Gray 2–17, Ashton Shumpert 1–17, Fitzgerald 1–9, Jordan Thomas 1–6, Dontavian Lee 1–0; BYU: Nick Kurtz 7–62, Colby Pearson 4–36, Moroni Laulu-Pututau 2–34, Tanner Balderdee 1–25, Jonah Trinnaman 1–7, Hunter Marshall 1–1.
- Interceptions: MSU: Mark McLaurin 1–27; BYU: Kai Nacua 1–10, Micah Hannemann 1–0.

=== Boise State ===
BYU learned during pregame festivities that Jamaal Williams suffered a knee injury against Mississippi State and would be unable to play. Squally Canada filled in for him rushing for 88 yards, a career-high, but Boise State's defense was able to force BYU to become one-dimensional and focus on passing the ball. Hill would complete only 50% and have a season low in terms of passing yards. Of the 21 incompletions, 12 different balls were dropped by the receivers. BYU's defense kept the Cougars in the game, forcing Boise State to a season high 5 turnovers (3 fumbles, 2 interceptions), a missed field goal, a blocked field goal, and a muffed punt. However, the Cougars found themselves unable to contain Jeremy McNichols, who went for a season high 249 all purpose yards and two touchdowns. BYU has now suffered four losses by a combined 8 points, making them the most dangerous four loss team in the country. Of BYU's four losses, 3 of them are now ranked in the Top 25 after week 8 (Boise State, West Virginia, and Utah).

BYU at Boise State

Team	1	2	3	4	Total
Cougars	0	17	7	3	27
• #14 Broncos	14	7	0	7	28

- Date: October 20
- Location: Albertsons Stadium
  Boise, ID
- Game start: 8:21 p.m. MDT
- Elapsed time: 3:59
- Game attendance: 34,575
- Game weather: 55 °F (13 °C), Partly Cloudy, winds 5 mph E
- Referee: Brandon Cruse • Umpire: M. Fitzgerald • Linesman: Brad Edwards • Line judge: Quentin Givens • Back judge: Daniel Young • Field judge: Rich Almeroth • Side judge: T Salaam • Center judge: Stephen Baron
- TV announcers (ESPN): Jason Benetti, Kelly Stouffer, Paul Carcaterra

Uniform combination: white helmet, white jersey, blue pants.

Scoring summary

Quarter	Time	Drive			Team	Scoring information	Score	
Quarter	Time	Plays	Yards	TOP	Team	Scoring information	BYU	BSU
1	14:11	3	82	0:49	BSU	Jeremy McNichols 76-yard touchdown reception from Brett Rypien, Tyler Rausa kick good	0	7
1	8:13	3	58	3:52	BSU	Thomas Sperbeck 12-yard touchdown reception from Brett Rypien, Tyler Rausa kick good	0	14
2	14:49	7	36	2:00	BYU	35-yard field goal by Rhett Almond	3	14
2	14:22				BYU	Interception returned 59 yards for touchdown by Fred Warner, Rhett Almond kick good	10	14
2	4:54				BYU	Interception returned 50 yards for touchdown by Dayan Lake, Rhett Almond kick good	17	14
2	0:35	7	69	1:06	BSU	Cedrick Wilson 36-yard touchdown reception from Brett Rypien, Tyler Rausa kick good	17	21
3	6:55	8	58	1:57	BYU	Taysom Hill 1-yard touchdown run, Rhett Almond kick good	24	21
4	13:33	4	1	2:19	BYU	37-yard field goal by Rhett Almond	27	21
4	10:37	10	90	2:56	BSU	Jeremy McNichols 4-yard touchdown run, Tyler Rausa kick good	27	28
"TOP" = time of possession. For other American football terms, see Glossary of American football.							27	28

Game Stats:

- Passing: BYU: Taysom Hill 21–42–0—187; BSU: Brett Rypien 25–39–2—442.
- Rushing: BYU: Squally Canada 21–88, Hill 13–48, Algernon Brown 2–8, Jonny Linehan 1-(−3), Aleva Hifo 1-(−6); BSU: Jeremy McNichols 30–140, Alex Mattison 1–4, Rypien 4(−15).
- Receiving: BYU: Mitch Juergens 4–57, Tanner Balderree 2–33, Colby Pearson 4–31, Jonah Trinnaman 3–24, Nick Kurtz 2–16, Moroni Laulu-Pututau 2–14, Cana 3–7, Beau Tanner 1–5; BSU: Thomas Sperback 9–109, McNichols 5–109, Sean Modster 4–82, Cedrick Wilson 4–68, Jake Knight 1–46, Mattison 1–15, Chaz Anderson 1–13.
- Interceptions: BYU: Fred Warner 1–59, Dayan Lake 1–50.

=== Cincinnati ===
BYU at Cincinnati

Team	1	2	3	4	Total
• Cougars	0	10	7	3	20
Bearcats	3	0	0	0	3

- Date: November 5
- Location: Nippert Stadium
  Cincinnati, OH
- Game start: 3:42 p.m. EDT
- Elapsed time: 2:58
- Game attendance: 37,522
- Game weather: 60 °F (16 °C), Abundant Sunshine, winds 1 mph SSW
- Referee: Cooper Castleberry • Umpire: Jim Adams • Linesman: Cal McNeill • Line judge: Kelly Deterding • Back judge: Donnie Aultman • Field judge: Scott Gaines • Side judge: Anthony Fleming • Center judge: Chris Tallent
- TV announcers (CBSSN): Dave Ryan, Corey Chavous, Melanie Collins

Uniform combination: white helmet, white jersey, blue pants.

Scoring summary

Quarter	Time	Drive			Team	Scoring information	Score	
Quarter	Time	Plays	Yards	TOP	Team	Scoring information	BYU	CIN
1	12:35	7	59	2:25	CIN	23-yard field goal by Josh Pasley	0	3
1	0:38	9	52	4:06	BYU	28-yard field goal by Rhett Almond	3	3
2	0:48	13	92	6:08	BYU	Taysom Hill 8-yard touchdown run, Rhett Almond kick good	10	3
3	8:26	12	70	6:26	BYU	Squally Canada 1-yard touchdown run, Rhett Almond kick good	17	3
4	1:39	16	60	9:40	BYU	19-yard field goal by Rhett Almond	20	3
"TOP" = time of possession. For other American football terms, see Glossary of American football.							20	3

Game Stats:

- Passing: BYU: Taysom Hill 15–25–1—130; CIN: Gunner Kiel 19–32–1—199.
- Rushing: BYU: Jamaal Williams 25–96, Hill 12–75, Squally Canada 9–41, Team 1-(−1); CIN: Tion Green 16–86, Mike Boone 2–22, Kahlil Lewis 2–5, Chad Banschbach 2–4, Team 1-(−1), Kiel 2-(−16).
- Receiving: BYU: Jonah Trinnaman 2–47, Nick Kurtz 4–33, Mitch Juergens 4–24, Colby Pearson 2–16, Algernon Brown 2–11, Aleva Hifo 1-(−1); CIN: Devin Gray 7–105, Tion Green 5–22, Lewis 1–16, Nate Cole 1–15, Thomas Geddis 1–14, Mike Boone 1–11, Tshumbi Johnson 1–9, Banschbach 2–7.
- Interceptions: BYU: Austin McChesney 1–37; CIN: Zach Edwards 1–6.

=== Southern Utah ===
Southern Utah at BYU

Team	1	2	3	4	Total
Thunderbirds	0	7	0	0	7
• Cougars	14	17	0	6	37

- Date: November 12
- Location: LaVell Edwards Stadium
  Provo, UT
- Game start: 1:05 p.m. MST
- Elapsed time: 3:16
- Game attendance: 59,302
- Game weather: 66 °F (19 °C), Clear, winds calm
- Referee: Scott Campbell • Umpire: Joel Bellinger • Linesman: Doug Moore • Line judge: Keith Garmond • Back judge: Joel Wetze • Field judge: Randy Smith • Side judge: Corey Luxner • Center judge: Stacy Hardin
- TV announcers (BYUtv/ESPN3): Dave McCann, Blaine Fowler, Lauren Francom

Uniform combination: white helmet, blue jersey, white pants.

Scoring summary

Quarter	Time	Drive			Team	Scoring information	Score	
Quarter	Time	Plays	Yards	TOP	Team	Scoring information	SUU	BYU
1	12:14	2	47	0:27	BYU	Taysom Hill 16-yard touchdown run, Rhett Almond kick good	0	7
1	1:27	12	80	6:33	BYU	Nick Kurtz 31-yard touchdown reception from Taysom Hill, Rhett Almond kick good	0	14
2	9:31	5	30	2:05	BYU	28-yard field goal by Rhett Almond	0	17
2	3:56	7	62	3:44	BYU	Colby Pearson 21-yard touchdown reception from Taysom Hill, Rhett Almond kick good	0	24
2	2:02	6	75	1:54	SUU	Logan Parker 17-yard touchdown reception from Patrick Tyler, Keita Calhoun kick good	7	24
2	0:46	6	82	1:08	BYU	KJ Hall 2-yard touchdown run, Rhett Almond kick good	7	31
4	10:31	10	50	5:36	BYU	30-yard field goal by Rhett Almond	7	34
4	0:51	10	56	6:08	BYU	20-yard field goal by Rhett Almond	7	37
"TOP" = time of possession. For other American football terms, see Glossary of American football.							7	37

Game Stats:

- Passing: SUU: Patrick Tyler 19–32–0—144, Raysean Pringle 0–1–0—0; BYU: Taysom Hill 22–29–1—320, Tanner Mangum 11–13–0—121.
- Rushing: SUU: Malik Brown 8–25, Pringle 3–15, Tyler 7-(−19); BYU: KJ Hall 12–59, Mangum 4–42, Hill 7–29, Algernon Brown 7–28, Colby Hansen 3–8, Sqally Canada 6–5, Team 1-(−16).
- Receiving: SUU: Pringle 3–63, Steven Wroblews 3–30, Logan Parker 3–26, Mike Sharp 5–15, Brown 2–13, Ty Rutledge 1–1, Isaiah Diego-Wi 1-(−2), James Felila 1-(−2); BYU: Mitch Juergens 6–82, Nick Kurtz 5–69, Brayden El_Bakri 4–69, Hall 3–68, Colby Pearson 4–51, Talon Shumway 2–36, Jonah Trinnaman 3–20, Aleva Hifo 2–12, Garrett Juergens 1–11, Moroni Laulu-Pututau 1–9, Hunter Marshall 1–9, Tanner Balderree 1–5.
- Interceptions: SUU: Josh Thornton 1–0.

=== UMass ===
UMass at BYU

Team	1	2	3	4	Total
Minutemen	6	3	0	0	9
• Cougars	0	14	20	17	51

- Date: November 19
- Location: LaVell Edwards Stadium
  Provo, UT
- Game start: 12:05 p.m. MST
- Elapsed time: 3:30
- Game attendance: 51,190
- Game weather: 55 °F (13 °C), Partly Cloudy, winds 10 mph SE
- Referee: Rick Loumiet • Umpire: Nichol Pergine • Linesman: Todd Riddick • Line judge: Colin Gaynor • Back judge: James E. Downey • Field judge: Jim Smith • Side judge: Matt Waldron • Center judge: Mike Viles
- TV announcers (BYUtv/ESPN3): Dave McCann, Blaine Fowler, Lauren Francom

Uniform combination: white helmet, blue jersey, white pants.

Scoring summary

Quarter	Time	Drive			Team	Scoring information	Score	
Quarter	Time	Plays	Yards	TOP	Team	Scoring information	UMass	BYU
1	3:27	3	71	1:08	UMass	Bernard Davis 70-yard touchdown reception from Andrew Ford, Mike Caggiano kick failed	6	0
2	6:55	10	75	3:34	BYU	KJ Hall 11-yard touchdown run, Rhett Almond kick good	6	7
2	12:55	6	22	1:47	UMass	44-yard field goal by Logan Laurent	9	7
2	6:55	13	86	4:21	BYU	Harvey Langi 2-yard touchdown run, Rhett Almond kick good	9	14
3	11:30	11	53	3:22	BYU	33-yard field goal by Rhett Almond	9	17
3	9:13	4	2	1:25	BYU	34-yard field goal by Rhett Almond	9	20
3	7:18	5	17	1:48	BYU	Harvey Langi 2-yard touchdown run, Rhett Almond kick good	9	27
3	6:20				BYU	Interception returned 39 yards for touchdown by Francis Bernard, Rhett Almond kick good	9	34
4	12:50	12	54	6:01	BYU	Taysom Hill 5-yard touchdown run, Rhett Almond kick good	9	41
4	5:22	4	36	2:38	BYU	Garrett Juergens 7-yard touchdown reception from Tanner Mangum, Rhett Almond kick good	9	48
4	3:05	4	4	2:13	BYU	21-yard field goal by Rhett Almond	9	51
"TOP" = time of possession. For other American football terms, see Glossary of American football.							9	51

Game Stats:

- Passing: UMass: Andrew Ford 27–40–2—288; BYU: Taysom Hill 19–31–0—171, Tanner Mangum 2–4–0—19.
- Rushing: UMass: Marquis Young 10–40, Andy Isabella 3–32, Team 1-(−1), John Robinson-Woodgett 1-(−2), Ford 5-(−29); BYU: KJ Hall 18–101, Hill 13–86, Harvey Langi 14–56, Aleva Hifo 1–6, Colby Hansen 1–2, Algernon Brown 1–2, Team 1-(−1).
- Receiving: UMass: Adam Breneman 8–79, Bernard Davis 2–76, Isabella 6–57, Jalen Williams 6–50, Robinson 1–10; BYU: Moroni Laulu-Pututau 5–42, Colby Pearson 2–38, Mitch Juergens 4–30, Nick Kurtz 3–20, Tanner Balderree 2–18, Talon Shumway 1–13, Nate Sampson 1–12, Hall 2–10, Garrett Juergens 1–7.
- Interceptions: BYU: Francis Bernard 1–39, Isai Armstrong 1–0.

=== Utah State ===
Utah State at BYU

Team	1	2	3	4	Total
Aggies	3	7	0	0	10
• Cougars	0	14	7	7	28

- Date: November 26
- Location: LaVell Edwards Stadium
  Provo, UT
- Game start: 8:26 p.m. MST
- Elapsed time: 3:08
- Game attendance: 53,603
- Game weather: 50 °F (10 °C), Cloudy, winds 20 mph S
- Referee: David Alvarez • Umpire: Stuart Schake • Linesman: George Shoup • Line judge: Steve Hoslett • Back judge: Micah Aaronian • Field judge: Scotty Melacon • Side judge: Rick Ockey • Center judge: Tim Davis
- TV announcers (ESPNU/BYUtv): Mark Neely, Dan Hawkins (ESPNU)
  Dave McCann, Blaine Fowler, Lauren Francom (BYUtv)

Uniform combination: black helmet with royal blue decals and royal blue chromium facemasks, black jersey, black pants.

Scoring summary

Quarter	Time	Drive			Team	Scoring information	Score	
Quarter	Time	Plays	Yards	TOP	Team	Scoring information	USU	BYU
1	9:39	12	64	5:21	USU	28-yard field goal by Brock Warren	3	0
2	12:35	8	90	3:52	BYU	Jamaal Williams 2-yard touchdown run, Rhett Almond kick good	3	7
2	2:50				BYU	Michael Shelton 52-yard fumble return for a touchdown, Rhett Almond kick good	3	14
2	0:42	2	6	0:42	USU	Damion Hobbs 2-yard touchdown run, Brock Warren kick good	10	14
3	2:19	15	75	5:34	BYU	Mitch Juergens 10-yard touchdown reception from Taysom Hill, Rhett Almond kick good	10	21
4	12:55	9	38	3:33	BYU	Colby Pearson 5-yard touchdown reception from Tanner Mangum, Rhett Almond kick good	10	28
"TOP" = time of possession. For other American football terms, see Glossary of American football.							10	28

Game Stats:

- Passing: USU: Kent Meyers 12–23–1—103; BYU: Taysom Hill 10–21–2—101, Tanner Mangum 1–1–0—5.
- Rushing: USU: Tonny Lindsey 8–47, Myers 12–42, Lajuan Hunt 5–12, Damion Hobbs 2–4, Team 1-(−8); BYU: Jamaal Williams 18–131, Hill 12–46, Squally Canada 10–40, Harvey Langi 6–23, KJ Hall 4–23, Team 1-(−2), Mangum 3-(−12).
- Receiving: USU: Braelon Roberts 3–27, Wyatt Houston 2–22, Andrew Rodriguez 1–14, Rayshad Lewis 3–13, Ronquavion Tarver 1–12, Kennedy Williams 1–8, Zach Van Leeuwen 1–7; BYU: Nick Kurtz 4–50, Moroni Laulu-Pututau 1–15, Garrett Juergens 1–12, Colby Pearson 2–11, Mitch Juergens 1–10, Hunter Marshall 1–5, Tanner Balderree 1–3.
- Interceptions: USU: Jalen Davis 1–37, Dallin Leavitt 1–7; BYU: Fred Warner 1–2.

=== Poinsettia Bowl ===
BYU vs. Wyoming

Team	1	2	3	4	Total
• Cougars	7	3	7	7	24
Cowboys	0	0	7	14	21

- Date: December 21
- Location: Qualcomm Stadium
  San Diego, CA
- Game start: 6:10 p.m. PST
- Elapsed time: 3:17
- Game attendance: 28,114
- Game weather: 70 °F (21 °C), Overcast, occasional rain, winds 5 mph S
- Referee: Greg Blum • Umpire: Brad Hudak • Linesman: Vincent Winters • Line judge: Ric Hinkamper • Back judge: Doug Warns • Field judge: Raymond Daniel • Side judge: Ryan Flynn
- TV announcers (ESPN/ESPN Radio): Jaso Benetti, Kelly Stouffer, Paul Carcaterra (ESPN)
  Bill Rosinski, David Norrie, Ian Fitzsimmons (ESPN Radio)

Uniform combination: white helmet, white jersey, white pants.

Scoring summary

Quarter	Time	Drive			Team	Scoring information	Score	
Quarter	Time	Plays	Yards	TOP	Team	Scoring information	BYU	WYO
1	0:38	2	3	0:47	BYU	Tanner Mangum 3-yard touchdown run, Rhett Almond kick good	7	0
2	3:08	11	66	5:24	BYU	27-yard field goal by Rhett Almond	10	0
3	6:35	16	60	8:22	WYO	Brian Hill 4-yard touchdown run, Cooper Rothe kick good	10	7
3	2:42	8	73	3:47	BYU	Tanner Balderree 5-yard touchdown reception from Tanner Mangum, Rhett Almond kick good	17	7
4	14:07	5	55	2:36	BYU	Jamaal Williams 36-yard touchdown run, Rhett Almond kick good	24	7
4	7:35	14	76	6:26	WYO	Tanner Gentry 9-yard touchdown reception from Josh Allen, Cooper Rothe kick good	24	14
4	2:11	7	81	3:00	WYO	Tanner Gentry 23-yard touchdown reception from Josh Allen, Cooper Rothe kick good	24	21
"TOP" = time of possession. For other American football terms, see Glossary of American football.							24	21

Game Stats:

- Passing: BYU: Tanner Mangum 8–15–1—96; WYO: Josh Allen 17–32–2—207, Nick Szpor 0–1–0—0
- Rushing: BYU: Jamaal Williams 26–210, Squally Canada 4–17, KJ Hall 1–1, Team 2-(−4), Tanner Mangum 2-(−8); WYO: Brian Hill 26–93, Shaun Wick 13–58, Josh Allen 6–38, Ethan Wood 1-(−20)
- Receiving: BYU: Nick Kurtz 3–59, Colby Pearson 2–16, Moroni Laulu-Pututau 1–11, Tanner Balderree 1–5, Jonah Trinnaman 1–5; WYO: Tanner Gentry 7–113, Jake Maulhardt 2–33, Brian Hill 1–19, Jacob Hollister 2–15, Josh Harshman 1–9, C.J. Johnson 2–6, Shaun Wick 1–6, Austin Conway 1–6
- Interceptions: BYU: Kai Nacua 1–20, Dayan Ghanwoloku 1–14; WYO: Andrew Wingard 1–20
