= Michelle Kaufusi =

American politician (born 1966)

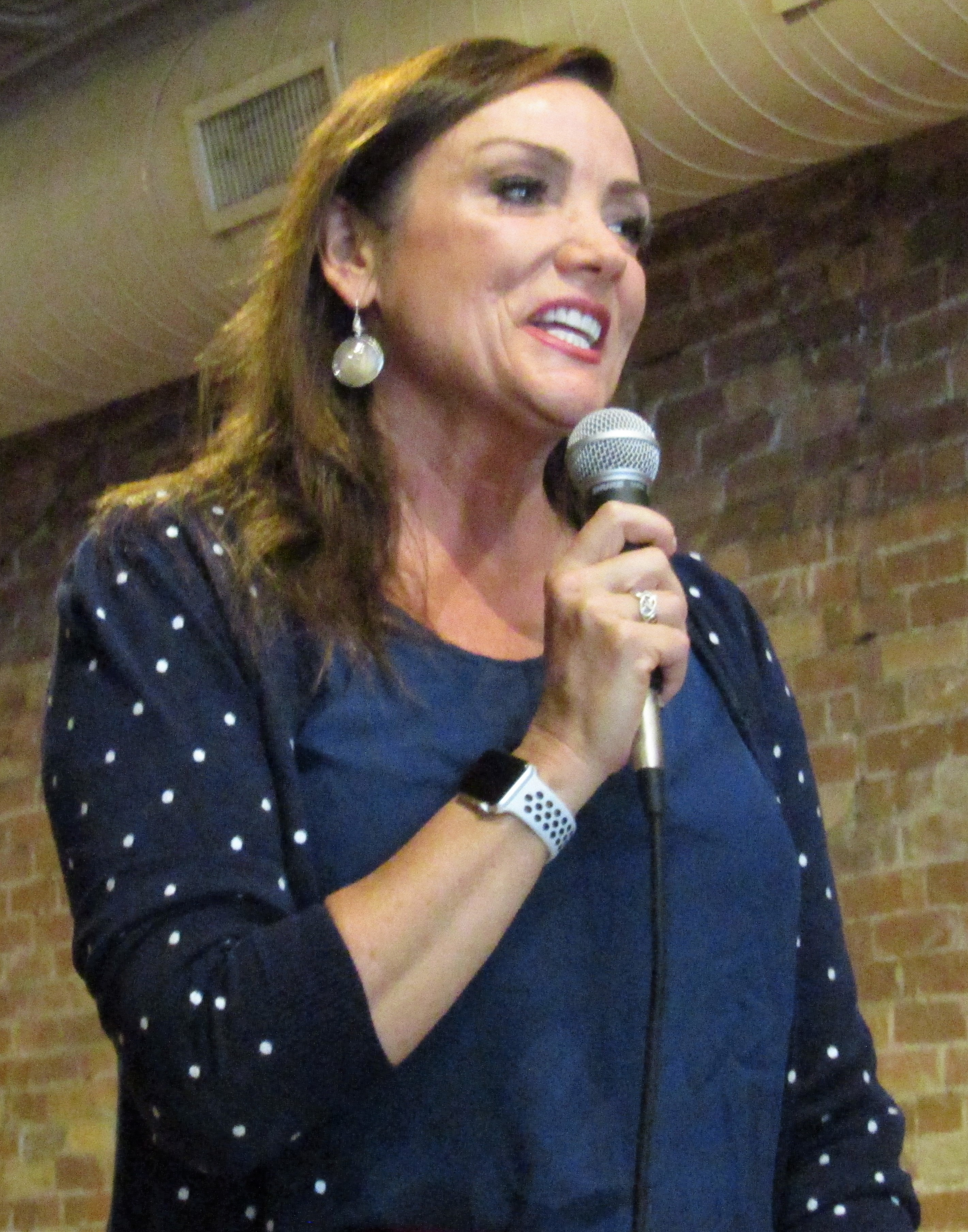

45th Mayor of Provo
- In office January 18, 2018 – January 6, 2026
- Preceded by: John Curtis
- Succeeded by: Marsha Judkins

Personal details
- Born: Michelle Garrick; October 14, 1966 (age 60) Provo, Utah, U.S.
- Party: Republican
- Spouse: Steve Kaufusi
- Children: Corbin and Bronson
- Education: Brigham Young University (BS)

Michelle Kaufusi (born October 14, 1966) is an American politician who served as the 45th mayor of Provo, Utah from 2018 to 2026. She is a member of the Republican Party.

== Early life and education ==
Kaufusi was born and raised in Provo, Utah. Kaufusi is a member of the Church of Jesus Christ of Latter-day Saints. Her mother is also a member of the church, and her father left the family when she was six. She graduated from Provo High, where she served in student government and earned an academic scholarship to BYU. She studied at Brigham Young University where she received a Bachelor of Science degree in Geography.

== Career ==
After graduating from college, she moved to Pennsylvania to join her husband, who she had married a few months earlier, who was then playing for the Philadelphia Eagles. Her first two children were born in Pennsylvania. They then spent a few years in Salt Lake City while her husband studied at and coached at the University of Utah. They returned to Provo in 2002. Prior to her election as mayor, Kaufusi served as a member of the Provo School Board for six years.

On February 7, 2020, former governor Jon Huntsman Jr. announced Kaufusi as his running mate in the 2020 Utah gubernatorial election. In the Republican primary, Huntsman was narrowly defeated by Spencer Cox.

In 2025, Kaufusi lost her bid for reelection to Marsha Judkins.

== Personal life ==
Kaufusi is married to Steve Kaufusi who was formerly the defensive line coach for Brigham Young University. Her son, Bronson Kaufusi, was a defensive end for the Green Bay Packers while her other son, Corbin Kaufusi, played basketball and football at BYU and played for the San Francisco 49ers.
