= James G. Herman =

American oncologist

James Gordon Herman is an American oncologist.

Herman studied chemistry at Hope College and earned a medical degree from the Johns Hopkins School of Medicine. He completed his residency in internal medicine at Duke University in 1992, and a fellowship in medical oncology at Johns Hopkins in 1996. Herman then became associate professor of oncology at the Sidney Kimmel Comprehensive Cancer Center, and later the UPMC Endowed Chair for Lung Cancer Research at the University of Pittsburgh.
