= James P. Herman =

American neuroscientist

James P. Herman is an American neuroscientist.

He graduated from Hobart College with a bachelor's degree and completed his doctorate at the University of Rochester, followed by a fellowship at the University of Michigan's Molecular and Behavioral Neuroscience Institute. He joined the University of Kentucky faculty as an associate professor, where he served as James and Barbara Holsinger Chair of Anatomy and Neurobiology. In 2000, Herman moved to the University of Cincinnati. He was named Donald C. Harrison Endowed Chair in Medicine at UC in 2014, and a distinguished research professor in 2016. The University of Cincinnati elected to merge its Department of Pharmacology and Cell Biophysics with the Department of Molecular and Cellular Physiology in July 2017, and Herman was named chair of the Department of Pharmacology and Systems Physiology, as well as Flor Van Maanen Professor of Pharmacology and Experimental Therapeutics in August 2018.
