= Lance Reynolds =

American politician

Member of the Arkansas House of Representatives from the 59th district
- In office January 8, 2007 – January 10, 2011
- Preceded by: Bill Stovall
- Succeeded by: Josh Johnston

Personal details
- Party: Democratic

Lance Reynolds is an American politician who served in the Arkansas House of Representatives from the 59th district from 2007 to 2011.
