= Gordon Hudson =

American football player (1962–2021)

No. 85
- Position: Tight end

Personal information
- Born: June 22, 1962; Everett, Washington, U.S.
- Died: September 27, 2021 (aged 59); San Jose, California, U.S.
- Listed height: 6 ft 4 in (1.93 m)
- Listed weight: 231 lb (105 kg)

Career information
- High school: Brighton (Salt Lake City, Utah)
- College: BYU
- Supplemental draft: 1984: 1st round

Career history
- Los Angeles Express (USFL) (1984–1985); Seattle Seahawks (1986); Denver Broncos (1988)*
- * Offseason or practice squad member only

Awards and highlights
- All-USFL (1985); National champion (1984); 2× Unanimous All-American (1982, 1983); 2× First-team All-WAC (1982, 1983); Second-team All-WAC (1981)
- Stats at Pro Football Reference
- College Football Hall of Fame

Gordon Lynn Hudson (June 22, 1962 — September 27, 2021) was an American professional football player who was a tight end in the United States Football League (USFL) and National Football League (NFL) for three seasons during the 1980s. Hudson played college football for Brigham Young University, was a two-time consensus All-American, and set the NCAA record for most career receiving yards by a tight end (2,484). He was elected to the College Football Hall of Fame in 2009.

== Early life ==
Hudson was born in Everett, Washington. He attended Brighton High School in Salt Lake City, Utah. He lettered twice in three different sports, football, basketball and baseball. He was an all-conference tight end in football while also earning all-conference honors in basketball.

== College career ==
The highly recruited Hudson suited up for some varsity games while playing mostly with the JV team. As a sophomore, he earned the starting tight end role and was selected by coaches as the most valuable rookie. He received All-WAC Second-team honors as well as Associated Press All-America Honorable Mention honors. He was second in the WAC in receiving and fifth in the NCAA with 5.6 receptions per game while averaging 14.3 yards per catch. He totaled 67 catches for 960 yards and 10 touchdowns.

His top outing of the year was 13 catches for 259 yards and three touchdowns vs. Utah (the 259-yard outing set an NCAA record for most yards by a tight end in a single game) and he was named WAC Player of the Week for the effort. He also tied the NCAA record of 67 receptions in a season by a tight end. He made seven grabs for 126 yards and one touchdown vs. Washington State in the Holiday Bowl.

As a junior, in 1982, he was a consensus All-America pick. He was the only unanimous All-WAC selection and again had 67 catches for 928 yards and six touchdowns, averaging 13.9 yards per catch and 6.1 catches per game. He reportedly made some spectacular one-handed grabs among his seven receptions for 81 yards against Ohio State in the Holiday Bowl.

In 1983, as a senior, Hudson earned consensus All-America honors again along with quarterback Steve Young, giving BYU two consensus All-Americans in the same season for the first in BYU history. He was All-WAC First-team for the second time and totaled 44 catches for 596 yards and six touchdowns in eight games before having his season shortened by an injury. He averaged 13.5 yards per catch and 5.5 catches per game. Hudson finished his career as the NCAA record holder for most career receiving yards by a tight end with 2,484.

== Professional career ==
Hudson played for the Los Angeles Express of the United States Football League in 1984 and 1985, where he received All-USFL honors during the league's last season in 1985.

Drafted by the Seattle Seahawks in the first round (22nd overall) of the 1984 NFL Supplemental Draft of USFL and CFL Players. He played sixteen games and ended with 13 receptions and one touchdown in 1986, which was his only NFL season.

== Life after football ==
Hudson worked as a real estate officer in Murray, Utah. He died from natural causes on September 27, 2021, in San Jose, California. He was 59.
