= Pete Van Valkenburg =

American gridiron football player (born 1950)

No. 36, 46, 40
- Position: Running back

Personal information
- Born: May 19, 1950 (age 76); Salt Lake City, Utah, U.S.
- Listed height: 6 ft 2 in (1.88 m)
- Listed weight: 210 lb (95 kg)

Career information
- High school: Hillcrest (UT)
- College: BYU
- NFL draft: 1973: 3rd round, 66th overall pick

Career history
- Buffalo Bills (1973); Green Bay Packers (1974); Chicago Bears (1974); Saskatchewan Roughriders (1976)

Awards and highlights
- Third-team All-American (1972)

Career NFL statistics
- Rushing attempts: 2
- Rushing yards: 20
- Receptions: 1
- Receiving yards: 7
- Kick/punt returns: 7
- Return yards: 64
- Stats at Pro Football Reference

Pete Van Valkenburg (sometimes referred to as Pete Van Valkenberg) is an American former professional football player who was a running back in the National Football League (NFL). He played college football for the BYU Cougars. Van Valkenburg was selected in the third round of the 1973 NFL draft by the New Orleans Saints and would play that season with the Buffalo Bills. He split the following season between the Green Bay Packers and the Chicago Bears. In 1976 he played 12 games for the Saskatchewan Roughriders of the Canadian Football League (CFL), gaining 572 rushing yards and 3 touchdowns on 129 carries, plus 421 yards receiving and 2 touchdown on 43 catches.

== See also ==
- List of college football yearly rushing leaders
