= Kevin Feterik =

American gridiron football player (born 1977)

No. 7
- Position: Quarterback

Personal information
- Born: September 14, 1977 (age 49); Westminster, California, U.S.

Career information
- College: BYU
- NFL draft: 2000: undrafted

Career history
- Seattle Seahawks (2000)*; San Francisco Demons (2001)*; Calgary Stampeders (2001–2003)
- * Offseason or practice squad member only

Awards and highlights
- Grey Cup champion (2001); First-team All-MW (1999)

Career CFL statistics
- TD–INT: 7–6
- Passing yards: 1,497

Kevin Feterik (born September 14, 1977) is an American former professional football quarterback who played for the Calgary Stampeders of the Canadian Football League (CFL). He played college football at BYU. As a senior in college he was a finalist for the Davey O'Brien Award. A Roman Catholic, Feterik chose to attend the Church of Jesus Christ of Latter-day Saints-owned BYU due to its esteemed quarterback program. He had brief preseason stints in the XFL with the San Francisco Demons (he never played a regular season game due to a thumb injury) and the NFL with the Seattle Seahawks before landing with the Stampeders.

Feterik remains among the most controversial choices for a CFL starting quarterback in the 21st century. The team was owned at the time by Feterik's father Michael. Feterik served as backup to Marcus Crandell for his first two seasons before Crandell was injured and Michael Feterik insisted that his son get the starting position; coach Wally Buono resigned rather than acquiesce to the demand, and his successor Jim Barker insisted on a contract clause stating that if Kevin were to start, it would be only on his own merits. Feterik left the Stampeders after one season as starter and never played professional football again.
