= Derwin Gray (defensive back) =

American football player and pastor (born 1971)

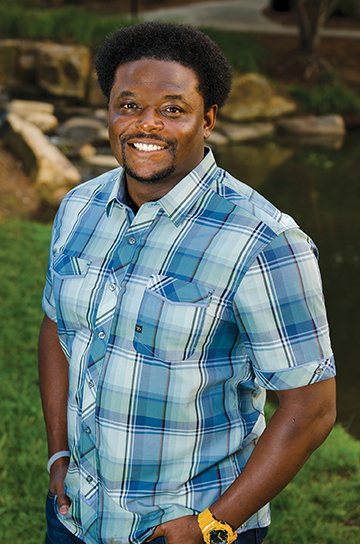
- Gray in 2013.

No. 30, 44
- Position: Defensive back

Personal information
- Born: April 9, 1971 (age 55); San Antonio, Texas, U.S.
- Listed height: 5 ft 11 in (1.80 m)
- Listed weight: 198 lb (90 kg)

Career information
- High school: Judson (Converse, Texas)
- College: BYU
- NFL draft: 1993: 4th round, 92nd overall pick

Career history
- Indianapolis Colts (1993–1997); Carolina Panthers (1998)

Career NFL statistics
- Tackles: 46
- Interceptions: 1
- Fumble recoveries: 2
- Stats at Pro Football Reference

Derwin Lamont Gray (born April 9, 1971) is an American pastor, evangelist, author, and former professional football player who was a defensive back for six seasons in the National Football League (NFL). He played college football for the BYU Cougars.

Gray is now the lead pastor of Transformation Church in Indian Land, South Carolina and has authored several books regarding race and faith. Crosswalk named him one of their top 12 most influential pastors in 2024.

== Early life ==
Gray was born to teenage parents in San Antonio, Texas and raised by his Jehovah's Witness grandmother, living in poverty. At age 13, he told his grandmother he would do something with his life, and found solace playing football for his high school, which he mentioned was ethnically diverse. As Gray describes it, football "was his god" and he was, in his own words, a "black kid from a lower socioeconomic, multiethnic context with a Jehovah's Witness religious background (whose god is football) attending a Mormon university" when he accepted a football scholarship to Brigham Young University (BYU).

== Professional football career ==
After a college football career with BYU and graduating, Gray was selected in the fourth round with the 92nd pick in the 1993 NFL draft. He played for five years with the Indianapolis Colts (1993–1997) and one year with the Carolina Panthers (1998). It was during his time with Indianapolis that teammate Steve Grant, who was nicknamed the "Naked Preacher", mentored Gray and led him to accept Christ.

Gray stated that during a 1998 preseason game with Carolina against the Buffalo Bills, he heard a voice in his head asking him, "What are you still doing out here?" after he made a tackle. He later suffered a season-ending knee injury that year. It was during his rehab that he spent time reading his Bible, losing the desire to continue his football career and deciding to become a pastor.

== Pastoral career ==
Gray and his wife Vicki began an itinerant speaking ministry, One Heart At A Time Ministries, in 1999. He went on to graduate magna cum laude from Southern Evangelical Seminary with a Master of Divinity degree in 2008, with a focus in apologetics. In the mid-2000s, Gray made an appearance as the "Evangelism Linebacker" as part of an evangelistic video series parodying Terry Tate: Office Linebacker.

Gray and his wife founded Transformation Church in January 2010. He cites his football experience frequently in his sermons, using it as an allegory for many of his messages. Transformation Church was listed by LifeWay Research and Outreach Magazine as one of the fastest-growing U.S. churches in the 2010s, and is now one of the largest churches in the Charlotte Metropolitan Area.

In 2018, Gray received his Doctor of Ministry in the New Testament in Context at Northern Seminary under Dr. Scot McKnight. Gray also speaks at conferences across the United States. He has written five books.

== Personal life ==
Gray married Vicki Ensign in 1992, whom he met his freshman year at BYU. They have two adult children.

Gray suffers from stuttering, but learned to overcome it while becoming a speaker, offering support to NFL draft prospect KC Concepcion when the latter was criticized for his own stuttering.

== NFL statistics ==
Team	Year	Games Played	Tackles
Indianapolis Colts	1993	11	124
Indianapolis Colts	1994	16	129
Indianapolis Colts	1995	16	112
Indianapolis Colts	1996	10	6
Indianapolis Colts	1997	11	9
Carolina Panthers	1998	3	0

== Bibliography ==
- Limitless Life: You Are More Than Your Past When God Holds Your Future (Thomas Nelson Inc., 2013)
- The Good Life: What Jesus Teaches About Finding True Happiness (B&H Publishing Group, 2020)
- The Building a Multiethnic Church: A Gospel Vision of Grace, Love, and Reconciliation in a Divided World (Thomas Nelson Inc., 2021)
- God, Do You Hear Me?: Discover the Prayer God Always Answers (B&H Publishing Group, 2021)
- How to Heal Our Racial Divide: What the Bible Says, and the First Christians Knew, about Racial Reconciliation (Tyndale House Publishers, 2022)
- Lit Up with Love: Becoming Good-News People to a Gospel-Starved World (NavPress Publishing Group, 2025)
