= Lakei Heimuli =

Tongan gridiron football player (born 1965)

No. 38
- Position: Running back

Personal information
- Born: June 24, 1965 (age 61); Vavaʻu, Tonga
- Listed height: 5 ft 11 in (1.80 m)
- Listed weight: 219 lb (99 kg)

Career information
- High school: Kahuku (Kahuku, Hawaii, U.S.)
- College: BYU
- NFL draft: 1987: 9th round, 249th overall pick

Career history
- Chicago Bears (1987); Los Angeles Rams (1988)*; Philadelphia Eagles (1989)*
- * Offseason or practice squad member only

Awards and highlights
- National champion (1984)

Career NFL statistics
- Rushing yards: 128
- Rushing average: 3.8
- Receptions: 5
- Receiving yards: 51
- Total touchdowns: 1
- Stats at Pro Football Reference

Lakei Heimuli (born June 24, 1965) is a Tongan-born former professional football running back in the National Football League (NFL). He played one season with the Chicago Bears, who selected him in the ninth round of the 1987 NFL draft.

Heimuli played college football as a running back at Brigham Young University (BYU) and lettered from 1984 to 1986. He rushed for 966 yards in 1986 as a senior and is second in all-time rushing yards with 2,710 yards. Heimuli is third all time in total touchdowns with 32 (30 rushing and 2 receiving. He attended Kahuku High School in Hawaii.

Pre-draft measurables
Height	Weight	Arm length	Hand span	40-yard dash	10-yard split	20-yard split	20-yard shuttle	Vertical jump	Broad jump	Bench press
5 ft 10 3/4 in (1.80 m)	219 lb (99 kg)	30 in (0.76 m)	9 1/2 in (0.24 m)	4.81 s	1.68 s	2.78 s	4.75 s	29.5 in (0.75 m)	8 ft 5 in (2.57 m)	20 reps
All values from NFL Combine

Two of his five children have also played college football. Helam Heimuli played at Weber State University and Houston Heimuli is currently a fullback at Brigham Young University after completing his bachelor's degree at Stanford University.
