= Chris Smith (tight end) =

American football player (born 1966)

No. 94
- Position: Tight end

Personal information
- Born: June 27, 1966 (age 60); La Cañada Flintridge, California, U.S.
- Listed height: 6 ft 4 in (1.93 m)
- Listed weight: 236 lb (107 kg)

Career information
- High school: La Cañada
- College: Arizona (1986); BYU (1987–1990)

Awards and highlights
- Unanimous All-American (1990); Third-team All-American (1989); 2× All-WAC (1989, 1990)

Christopher Smith (born June 27, 1966) is an American former college football player who was a tight end. He began his career with the Arizona Wildcats before transferring to play with the BYU Cougars, earning consensus All-American honors with BYU in 1990. Smith was selected by the Cincinnati Bengals of the National Football League (NFL) in the 11th round of the 1991 NFL draft.

== Early life ==
Smith attended La Cañada High School, where he was an All-California Interscholastic Federation (CIF) in football and track & field. In track, he set a school record in the 400 meters with 47.3 seconds. Smith also competed on a nationally rank 2 mile relay team with members of the LCHS track team, coached by Pat Logan. His spilt time was 1:49.3. In football, he played as a wide receiver. While at La Cañada he was also a captain of the track team and Most Valuable Player (MVP) of the football team.

== College career ==
Smith attended the University of Arizona in 1986 before transferring to Brigham Young University. While at BYU, he majored in health care administration.

As a redshirt freshman in 1987, he was the Cougars third-string tight end and played on special teams as well. In 1988, as a redshirt sophomore, he recorded nine receptions for 121 yards and one touchdown. As a redshirt junior in 1989, he was named the team's starting tight end and started all 13 games. He was named First-team All-American by The Sporting News, a Third-team All-American by the Associated Press and First-team All-Western Athletic Conference. He was also featured in an article in Sports Illustrated as a junior who would e turning professional a year early. In 1990, as a redshirt senior, he was a consensus All-American. He recorded 68 passes for 1,156 yards (an NCAA record for tight ends) and two touchdowns. He finished fifth in the nation in receiving yards. His record stood until 2005 when it was broken by Tulsa's Garrett Mills.

In 2011, Smith was ranked the third best tight end in BYU history by the Deseret News, and then in 2015, he was ranked the 27th best football player in school history.

=== Career statistics ===
Season				Receiving				
Year	Team	GP	GS	Rec	Yds	Avg	TD	Lng
1987	BYU	–	–	–	–	–	–	–
1988	BYU	12	1	9	121	13.4	1	–
1989	BYU	13	13	60	1,090	18.2	5	–
1990	BYU	13	13	68	1,156	17.0	2	–
Career		48	27	137	2,367	17.3	8	–

== Professional career ==
Pre-draft measurables
Height	Weight	Arm length	Hand span	40-yard dash	10-yard split	20-yard split	20-yard shuttle	Vertical jump	Broad jump
6 ft 3 3/4 in (1.92 m)	236 lb (107 kg)	31 1/2 in (0.80 m)	9 3/4 in (0.25 m)	5.06 s	1.80 s	2.97 s	4.34 s	26.5 in (0.67 m)	8 ft 5 in (2.57 m)
All values from NFL Combine

Prior to the NFL draft, Smith attended the NFL Scouting Combine and recorded a 5.05 in the 40-yard dash due to multiple injuries. After which a Sports Illustrated article was published before the draft that included negative quotes. The magazine featured tight end Jerry Evans, who was at the Combine and said of Smith: "He's effeminate. He can't block." NFL scout Dave Te' Thomas added: "I think Chris will look good in a business suit."

Smith was drafted by Cincinnati Bengals in the 11th round (295th overall) of the 1991 NFL draft. However, he was waived during the pre-season.

== Personal life ==
Smith is the son of Robert and Kay Smith. He is one of 10 children. His older brother, Ken, also played for the BYU Cougars as a starting nose guard. Before playing college football, Smith served a mission to Albuquerque, New Mexico from 1985–1987. He married Sarah Newby in April 1989, the couple have three children.
