= John Walsh (American football) =

American football player (born 1972)

No. 7
- Position: Quarterback

Personal information
- Born: December 12, 1972 (age 53); Torrance, California, U.S.
- Listed height: 6 ft 3 in (1.91 m)
- Listed weight: 214 lb (97 kg)

Career information
- High school: Carson (CA)
- College: Brigham Young
- NFL draft: 1995: 7th round, 213th overall pick

Career history
- Cincinnati Bengals (1995)*
- * Offseason or practice squad member only

Awards and highlights
- NCAA passing yards leader (1994); Second-team All-WAC (1993)

John Walsh (born December 12, 1972) is an American former football quarterback. He was the starting quarterback for Brigham Young University during the 1993 and 1994 seasons.

Pre-draft measurables
Height	Weight	Arm length	Hand span
6 ft 3 in (1.91 m)	214 lb (97 kg)	32 3/8 in (0.82 m)	9 3/4 in (0.25 m)

He left college as a junior to enter the NFL draft based on overly optimistic draft expectations. Although he was drafted in the seventh round by the Cincinnati Bengals, he was cut shortly thereafter and never played in the National Football League (NFL).

- 1993: 244/397 for 3,727 yards with 28 TD vs 15 INT.
- 1994: 284/463 for 3,712 yards with 29 TD vs 14 INT.

== See also ==
- List of college football yearly passing leaders
