= Steve Kaufusi =

Tongan gridiron football player (born 1963)

No. 94, 75
- Position: Defensive lineman

Personal information
- Born: October 17, 1963 (age 63); Nukuʻalofa, Tonga
- Listed height: 6 ft 4 in (1.93 m)
- Listed weight: 274 lb (124 kg)

Career information
- High school: South (Salt Lake City, Utah, U.S.)
- College: BYU
- NFL draft: 1988: 12th round, 319th overall pick

Career history
- Philadelphia Eagles (1988–1990); London Monarchs (1992)
- Stats at Pro Football Reference

Sitiveni P. Kaufusi (born October 17, 1963) is a former American football defensive lineman in the National Football League (NFL) for the Philadelphia Eagles from 1988 to 1990. He was selected in the 12th round of the 1988 NFL draft.

== College career ==
Kaufusi also played college football at Brigham Young University and attended junior college at Dixie State College (now known as Utah Tech University.)

== Coaching career ==
Most recently, Kaufusi was defensive-line coach at Brigham Young University, stepping down in January 2018. He played a key role in recruiting Polynesian players to BYU. Kaufusi was one of just a few Tongans coaching in Division I football.

== Personal life ==
Kaufusi's three sons, Bronson, Corbin, and Devin all played college football for the BYU Cougars. Devin also played football for the University of Utah. Bronson and Corbin both played for the BYU basketball team as well. His wife, Michelle Kaufusi was previously mayor of Provo, Utah.
