= Jim Herrmann (defensive end) =

American football player (born 1962)

Profile
- Position: Defensive end

Personal information
- Born: October 20, 1962 (age 64); Milwaukee, Wisconsin, U.S.
- Listed height: 6 ft 5 in (1.96 m)
- Listed weight: 256 lb (116 kg)

Career information
- High school: Arrowhead (Hartland, Wisconsin)
- College: BYU
- NFL draft: 1985: 7th round, 184th overall pick

Career history
- Dallas Cowboys (1985)*; Cincinnati Bengals (1986)
- * Offseason or practice squad member only

Awards and highlights
- National champion (1984); All-WAC (1984); Second-team All-WAC (1983)

James Herrmann (born October 20, 1962) is an American former professional football defensive end in the National Football League (NFL) for the Cincinnati Bengals. He played college football at Brigham Young University.

== Early life ==
Herrmann attended Arrowhead High School, where he was a starter at defensive end. He received All-county and All-conference honors as a senior. He also practiced basketball, baseball and track.

He accepted a football scholarship from Brigham Young University. As a junior, he was named a starter at defensive end, registering 36 tackles (2 for loss), 46 quarterback hurries and 16 sacks (school record).

As a senior, he was a co-captain, posting 62 tackles (10 for loss), 29 quarterback hurries and 6 sacks, while contributing to the team winning the 1984 National Championship.

He finished his college career with 106 tackles (12 for loss), 76 quarterback hurries, 26 sacks and 6 forced fumbles. At the time, he ranked second in school history in career sacks with 26 (sacks were not an official stat when Mekeli Ieremia played).

== Professional career ==
Herrmann was selected by the Dallas Cowboys in the seventh round (184th overall) of the 1985 NFL draft. He was waived on August 19.

In 1986, he was signed as a free agent by the Cincinnati Bengals. On August 18, he was placed on the injured reserve list with a knee injury. On July 27, 1987, the Bengals decided to release Herrmann, to avoid the risk of him being reinjured.

== Personal life ==
His maternal grandfather, John Smith, was an All-American at the University of Pennsylvania. Herrmann was an assistant football coach at Corner Canyon High School. In 2017, he was hired as the defensive line coach at Alta High School. In 2018, he was hired as an assistant football coach at Skyridge High School.
