= Corbin Kaufusi =

American football player (born 1993)

No. 69, 65
- Position: Offensive tackle

Personal information
- Born: April 12, 1993 (age 33); Provo, Utah, U.S.
- Listed height: 6 ft 10 in (2.08 m)
- Listed weight: 320 lb (145 kg)

Career information
- High school: Timpview (Provo, Utah)
- College: Brigham Young University
- NFL draft: 2019: undrafted

Career history
- New Orleans Saints (2019)*; New York Jets (2019–2020)*; San Francisco 49ers (2021)*; Tampa Bay Bandits (2022); Memphis Showboats (2023)
- * Offseason or practice squad member only
- Stats at Pro Football Reference

Corbin Kaufusi (born April 12, 1993) is an American former football offensive tackle. He played college football at BYU.

== Early life ==
Kaufusi attended Timpview High School in Provo, Utah. Helped team win state championships in 2008 and 2009.

== College career ==
After spending two years serving a mission for the Church of Jesus Christ of Latter-day Saints in South Korea, Kaufusi played football for BYU for the first time in 2016 and finished his career in 2018. He featured at defensive end for the Cougars, totaling 16 sacks in his career. He was also a member of the basketball team from 2014 to 2017, leading the team in blocked shots as a freshman (with 34) and finishing second as a sophomore (with 42). Notably, Kaufusi helped BYU upset Gonzaga on their own home court three consecutive years, including a 79–71 victory in 2017 in which the Bulldogs entered the game undefeated at 29–0 and ranked #1 in the nation. Kaufusi later helped BYU's football team upset #6 Wisconsin on the road at Camp Randall Stadium during his senior season in 2018.

== Professional career ==
Pre-draft measurables
Height	Weight	Arm length	Hand span
6 ft 8 1/2 in (2.04 m)	279 lb (127 kg)	36 1/8 in (0.92 m)	9 1/8 in (0.23 m)
All values from Pro Day

=== New Orleans Saints ===
On April 28, 2019, Kaufusi after going undrafted was signed by the New Orleans Saints. He was waived during final roster cuts on August 30, 2019.

Kaufusi was drafted in the 10th round during phase three in the 2020 XFL Draft by the St. Louis BattleHawks, but did not sign with the league.

=== New York Jets ===
On October 15, 2019, Kaufusi was signed to the New York Jets practice squad. He signed a reserve/future contract with the Jets on December 30, 2019.

On September 5, 2020, Kaufusi was waived by the Jets and signed to the practice squad the next day. His practice squad contract with the team expired after the season on January 11, 2021.

=== San Francisco 49ers ===
On January 15, 2021, Kaufusi signed a reserve/futures contract with the San Francisco 49ers. He was waived on August 24, 2021, but was re-signed three days later. He was waived on August 31, 2021, and re-signed to the practice squad the next day. He was released on September 8, 2021. He was re-signed to the practice squad on November 11. He was released on December 9.

=== Tampa Bay Bandits ===
Kaufusi was drafted in the sixth round by the Tampa Bay Bandits during the first night of the 2022 USFL draft on February 22, 2022. He was placed on injured reserve on June 10, 2022.

=== Memphis Showboats ===
Kaufusi and all other Tampa Bay Bandits players were all transferred to the Memphis Showboats after it was announced that the Bandits were taking a hiatus and that the Showboats were joining the league.

He became a free agent after the 2023 season.

== Personal life ==
His father, Steve Kaufusi, was the defensive line coach for BYU and his brother, Bronson Kaufusi, last played for the Green Bay Packers. His mother, Michelle Kaufusi, was the mayor of Provo from 2018 to 2026.
