= Bronson Kaufusi =

American football player (born 1991)

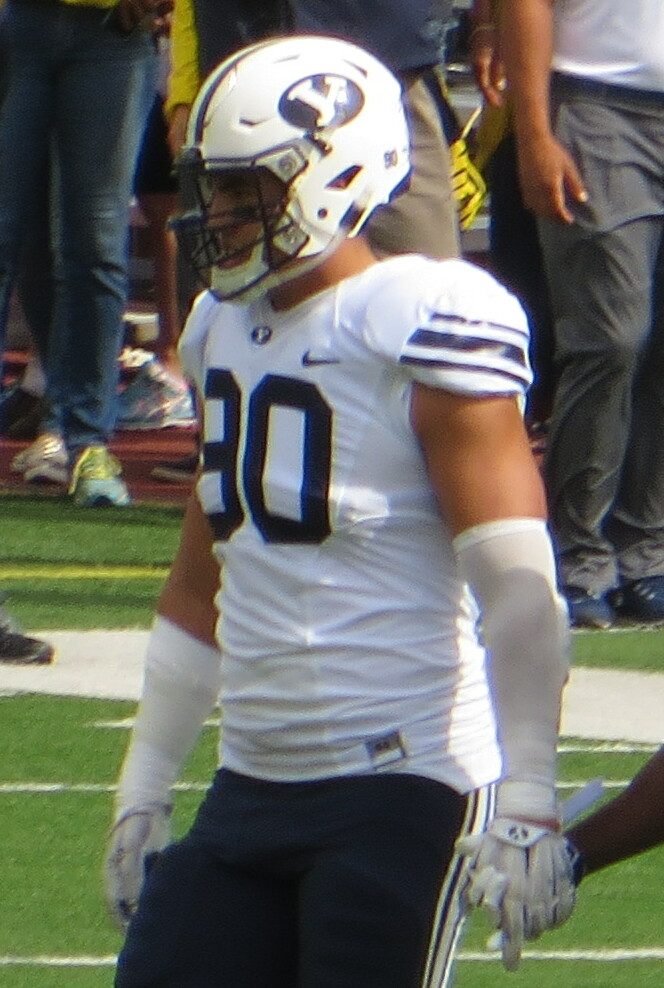
- Kaufusi with the BYU Cougars in 2015

No. 92, 91
- Position: Defensive end

Personal information
- Born: July 6, 1991 (age 35); Philadelphia, Pennsylvania, U.S.
- Listed height: 6 ft 6 in (1.98 m)
- Listed weight: 270 lb (122 kg)

Career information
- High school: Timpview (Provo, Utah)
- College: BYU
- NFL draft: 2016: 3rd round, 70th overall pick

Career history
- Baltimore Ravens (2016–2017); New York Jets (2018–2020); Green Bay Packers (2021)*
- * Offseason or practice squad member only

Career NFL statistics
- Total tackles: 8
- Sacks: 0.5
- Pass deflections: 1
- Stats at Pro Football Reference

Bronson Kaufusi (born July 6, 1991) is an American former professional football player who was a defensive end in the National Football League (NFL). He played college football for the BYU Cougars.

== Early life ==
Kaufusi attended Timpview High School in Provo, Utah. He had 70 tackles and 9.5 sacks as junior and 19 tackles and two sacks his senior year before suffering an injury. Kaufusi was rated by Rivals.com as a four-star recruit and was committed to the Brigham Young University (BYU) to play college football.

At high school football camps, Kaufusi primarily played tight end. However, his high school team did not use tight ends.

== College career ==
After spending two years on a mission for the Church of Jesus Christ of Latter-day Saints in Auckland, New Zealand, Kaufusi played for the first time at BYU in 2012. He played in all 13 games and had 23 tackles and 4.5 sacks. After the season, he played in 20 games for BYU's basketball team. As a sophomore in 2013, he had 41 tackles, four sacks and an interception returned for a touchdown. After spending his first two years as a defensive lineman, Kaufusi moved to linebacker his junior year. He finished the season 48 tackles and seven sacks. He moved back to defensive end his senior year and recorded 64 tackles and 11 sacks.

== Professional career ==
=== Pre-draft ===
On January 8, 2016, Bronson announced that he had received and accepted an invitation to the 2016 Senior Bowl. On January 30, 2016, he attended the Reese's Senior Bowl and was a part of the South's defensive line that dominated and led them to a 27–16 victory. He attended the NFL Combine and completed all of the required combine drills. Kaufusi performed well and finished 17th among defensive linemen in the 40-yard dash, fifth in the three-cone drill, tied Michigan State's Shilique Calhoun for fourth in the short shuttle, and finished 20th among defensive linemen in the bench press. On March 25, 2016, Kaufusi participated at BYU's pro day, along with Mitch Mathews, Ryker Mathews, Manoa Pikula, Graham Rowley, and six other prospects. Team representatives and scouts from 18 NFL teams attended to scout Kaufusi, who was the main attraction, as he opted to only run positional and stand on his combine numbers. At the conclusion of the pre-draft process, Kaufusi was projected as a second or third round prospect by the majority of NFL draft experts and scouts. He was ranked as the ninth best defensive end prospect by NFLDraftScout.com and the tenth best by NFL analyst Mike Mayock.

Pre-draft measurables
Height	Weight	Arm length	Hand span	40-yard dash	10-yard split	20-yard split	20-yard shuttle	Three-cone drill	Vertical jump	Broad jump	Bench press
6 ft 6 1/2 in (1.99 m)	285 lb (129 kg)	34 1/2 in (0.88 m)	9 3/4 in (0.25 m)	4.87 s	1.69 s	2.84 s	4.25 s	7.03 s	30 in (0.76 m)	9 ft 3 in (2.82 m)	25 reps
All values from NFL Combine,

=== Baltimore Ravens ===
==== 2016 ====
The Baltimore Ravens selected Kaufusi in the third round (70th overall) of the 2016 NFL draft. He was the only BYU player drafted in 2016 and the second of three edge rushers selected by the Ravens in the 2016 NFL Draft. The Ravens drafted Boise State's Kamalei Correa in the second round (42nd overall) and Grand Valley State's Matthew Judon in the fifth round (146th overall).

On June 14, 2016, the Ravens signed Kaufusi to a four-year, $3.45 million contract that includes a signing bonus of $845,016.

He competed with Lawrence Guy, Kapron Lewis-Moore and Mario Ojemudia throughout training camp for the backup defensive end position. On August 30, 2016, he was placed on injured reserve after breaking his ankle in training camp. He missed the entire 2016 season.

==== 2017 ====
Kaufusi competed with Brandon Williams, Carl Davis, Willie Henry throughout training camp for the vacant starting defensive end position left by the departure of Timmy Jernigan via trade. Head coach John Harbaugh named Kaufusi the backup left defensive end to Brent Urban to begin the regular season.

==== 2018 ====
On September 1, 2018, Kaufusi was waived by the Ravens.

=== New York Jets ===
On September 3, 2018, Kaufusi was signed to the practice squad of the New York Jets. He was promoted to the active roster on October 1, 2018. He was waived on October 5, 2018, and was re-signed back to the practice squad. He was promoted back to the active roster on December 8, 2018.

On October 4, 2019, Kaufusi was released by the Jets and re-signed to the practice squad. He signed a reserve/future contract with the Jets on December 30, 2019. At the end of the 2019 season, Jets head coach Adam Gase moved him from defense to the tight end position.

On September 5, 2020, Kaufusi was released by the Jets and signed to the practice squad the next day. His practice squad contract with the team expired after the season on January 11, 2021.

=== Green Bay Packers ===
On January 15, 2021, Kaufusi signed a reserve/future contract with the Green Bay Packers.

On August 31, 2021, Packers released Kaufusi as part of their final roster cuts. Kaufusi was resigned to the practice squad the next day.

== NFL career statistics ==
Career statistics			Tackles			Sacks		Interceptions			Other				
Season	Team	Games	Solo	Ast	Total	Sack	YdsL	Int	Yds	IntTD	DefTD	FFum	FRec	PD	Safety
2017	BAL	3	2	3	5	0	0	0	0	0	0	0	0	0	0
Career		3	2	3	5	0	0	0	0	0	0	0	0	0	0

== Personal life ==
His father, Steve Kaufusi, was the defensive line coach for BYU and his brother, Corbin Kaufusi, was an offensive tackle for the San Francisco 49ers. His wife, Hilary, also attended BYU and played on their soccer team. His mother, Michelle Kaufusi, was the mayor of Provo from 2018 until 2026.
