= 2025 BYU Cougars football team =

American college football season

2025 BYU Cougars football
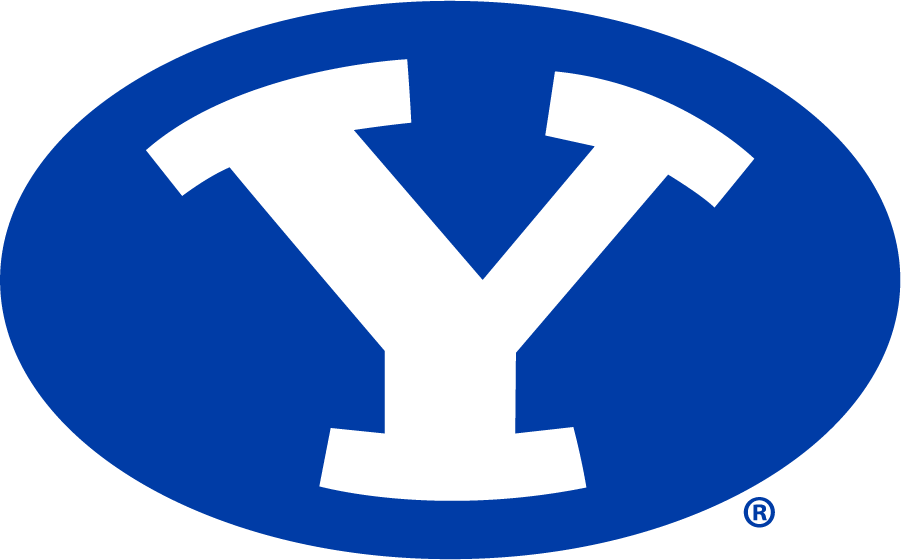

Pop-Tarts Bowl champion

Big 12 Championship Game, L 7–34 vs. Texas Tech

Pop-Tarts Bowl, W 25–21 vs. Georgia Tech
- Conference: Big 12 Conference

Ranking
- Coaches: No. 12
- AP: No. 11
- Record: 12–2 (8–1 Big 12)
- Head coach: Kalani Sitake (10th season)
- Offensive coordinator: Aaron Roderick (5th season)
- Offensive scheme: Power spread
- Defensive coordinator: Jay Hill (3rd season)
- Base defense: Multiple 4–3
- Home stadium: LaVell Edwards Stadium

Uniform

2025 Big 12 Conference football standings
	Conf.			Overall
Team	W		L	W		L
No. 7 Texas Tech y$^	8	–	1	12	–	2
No. 11 BYU y	8	–	1	12	–	2
No. 14 Utah	7	–	2	11	–	2
No. 22 Houston	6	–	3	10	–	3
Arizona	6	–	3	9	–	4
Arizona State	6	–	3	8	–	5
No. 25 TCU	5	–	4	9	–	4
Iowa State	5	–	4	8	–	4
Cincinnati	5	–	4	7	–	6
Kansas State	5	–	4	6	–	6
Baylor	3	–	6	5	–	7
Kansas	3	–	6	5	–	7
UCF	2	–	7	5	–	7
West Virginia	2	–	7	4	–	8
Colorado	1	–	8	3	–	9
Oklahoma State	0	–	9	1	–	11
Championship: Texas Tech 34, BYU 7
^ – College Football Playoff participant; $ – Conference champion; y – Championship game participant; Rankings from AP Poll

The 2025 BYU Cougars football team represented Brigham Young University (BYU) as a member of the Big 12 Conference during the 2025 NCAA Division I FBS football season. The Cougars were led by tenth-year head coach Kalani Sitake and play their home games at LaVell Edwards Stadium. With a loss by Arizona State on November 28, the Cougars clinched a berth in the 2025 Big 12 Championship Game, their first appearance in the Big 12 Championship Game in program history, where they were defeated by Texas Tech.

== Offseason ==
=== 2025 recruits ===
Name	Pos.	Height	Weight	Hometown	Notes
Tucker Kelleher	TE	6'6"	225	Alpharetta, Georgia	
Tyler Payne	LB	6'1"	220	Pleasant View, Utah	
Will Walker	K	6'5"	210	Riverton, Utah	Mission prior to enrolling
Andrew Williams	OL	6'8"	280	Kirksville, Missouri	
Austin Pay	OL	6'7"	295	Highland, Utah	Mission prior to enrolling
Sale Fano	DL	6'4"	225	Saratoga Springs, Utah	Mission prior to enrolling
Kendal Wall	DL	6'4"	235	Herriman, Utah	
Bryce Blake	TE	6'5"	235	Camarillo, California	Mission prior to enrolling
Jackson Doman	TE	6'6"	220	Canby, Oregon	Mission prior to enrolling
Ulavai Fetuli	DL	6'4"	275	Laie, Hawaii	
Kelepi Latu-Finau	DL	6'5"	280	Oakland, California	
Kingston Keanaaina	RB	6'0"	205	Union City, California	Mission prior to enrolling
Nolan Keeney	QB	6'5"	226	Tualatin, Oregon	Mission prior to enrolling
Lamason Waller III	WR	6'1"	178	Hesperia, California	
Siosiua Latu-Finau	OL	6'5"	310	Oakland, California	
Taani Makasini	LB	6'1"	200	Provo, Utah	Mission prior to enrolling
Vincent Tautua	DL	6'3"	250	Ewa Beach, Hawaii	
Jacob Nye	TE	6'5"	235	Melissa, Texas	
Jordyn Criss	DB	6'2"	165	Arlington, Texas	
Landan Goff	DB	6'3"	185	Highland, Utah	Mission prior to enrolling
McKay Madsen	RB	6'1"	228	Clovis, California	Mission prior to enrolling
Fuller Shurtz	P	5'11"	179	Katy, Texas	
Kila Keone	WR	6'3"	175	Honolulu, Hawaii	
Nusi Taumoepeau	LB	6'3"	225	Saratoga Springs, Utah	
Bear Bachmeier	QB	6'2"	215	Murrieta, California	
Emerson Geilman	QB	6'2"	225	Bountiful, Utah	
Alai Kalaniuvalu	OL	6'4"	300	Las Vegas, Nevada	Mission prior to enrolling

=== 2024 returned missionaries ===
Cannon Devries	DB	6'0"	165	Freshman
Pierson Watson	LB	6'3"	210	Freshman
Ethan Thomason	OL	6'8"	320	Freshman
Hunter Clegg	DL	6'4"	240	Freshman
Logan Payne	RB	5'10"	215	Freshman
Crew Clark	DB	6'1"	195	Freshman
Berkley Alfrey	LB	6'0"	235	Freshman
Brigham Alexander	OL	6'8"	320	Freshman
Jeff Lewis	OL	6'6"	295	Freshman
Cole Clement	TE	6'4"	240	Freshman
Trey Roberts	WR	6'1"	185	Freshman
Maverick McManus	DL	6'5"	270	Freshman
Caden McKee	OL	6'6"	270	Freshman
Strantz Mangisi	OL	6'4"	300	Freshman
Quinn Hale	WR	5'10"	175	Freshman
Carter Hancock	WR	6'0"	170	Freshman
Jared Esplin	WR	6'1"	175	Freshman

=== 2024 other additions ===
Name	Pos.	Height	Weight	Year	Previous school
Carsen Ryan	TE	6'4"	256	Senior	Transfer from University of Utah
Kyle Sfarcioc	OL	6'4"	295	Senior	Transfer from Southern Utah University
Anisi Purcell	DL	6'3"	266	Junior	Transfer from Southern Utah University
Tausili Akana	DL	6'4"	220	Sophomore	Transfer from University of Texas
Andrew Gentry	OL	6'7"	327	Junior	Transfer from University of Michigan
Keanu Tanuvasa	DL	6'4"	301	Junior	Transfer from University of Utah
Max Alford	LB	6'1"	245	Sophomore	Transfer from Utah State University
Joseph Douglas	DB	6'2"	208	Freshman	Transfer from Utah State University
Garrison Grimes	LS	6'4"	225	Senior	Transfer from Baylor University
Ty Smith	LS	6'0"	195	Freshman	Transfer from Boise State University
Keayan Nead	TE	6'5"	262	Junior	Transfer from Weber State University
Ethan Wood	TE	6'5"	255	Sophomore	Transfer from New Mexico State University
Reggie Frishknecht	WR	6'4"	200	Sophomore	Transfer from Snow College
Tiger Bachmeier	WR	6'1"	190	Junior	Transfer from Stanford University
Justin Kirkland	DL	6'3"	295	Senior	Transfer from Oklahoma State University
Tayvion Beasley	DB	5'11"	175	Junior	Transfer from San Diego State University
Kaufusi Pakofe	DL	6'3"	345	Senior	Transfer from Weber State University
Naki Tuakoi	DL	6'3"	230	Freshman	Originally Signed in 2024
Siosefa Brown	DL	6'4"	230	Freshman	Originally Signed in 2024

=== 2024 departures ===
Name	Pos.	Height	Weight	Year	Reason
Isaiah Bagnah	DE	6'4"	245	Senior	Graduation
Tyler Batty	DE	6'5"	275	Senior	Graduation
Gerry Bohanon	QB	6'3"	225	Senior	Graduation
Marque Collins	DB	5'11"	175	Senior	Graduation
Sam Dawe	OL	6'3"	310	Sophomore	Graduation
Caleb Etienne	OL	6'8"	320	Senior	Graduation
Mason Fakahua	TE	6'2"	245	Senior	Graduation
Keanu Hill	TE	6'4"	240	Senior	Graduation
Brayden Keim	OL	6'9"	315	Senior	Graduation
Darius Lassiter	WR	6'2"	210	Senior	Graduation
Blake Mangelson	DL	6'5"	275	Senior	Graduation
John Nelson	DL	6'4"	290	Senior	Graduation
Ray Paulo	TE	6'3"	255	Senior	Graduation
Connor Pay	OL	6'5"	315	Senior	Graduation
Jakob Robinson	DB	5'11"	170	Senior	Graduation
Ethan Slade	DB	6'0"	195	Junior	Graduation
Mata'ava Ta'ase	TE	6'3"	255	Senior	Graduation
Hinckley Ropati	RB	5'10"	215	Senior	Graduation
Miles Davis	RB	6'0"	215	Junior	Transfer
Micah Harper	DB	5'10"	195	Junior	Transfer
Kody Epps	WR	5'11"	187	Junior	Transfer
Jackson Bowers	TE	6'3"	245	Freshman	Transfer
Dalton Riggs	LS	6'3"	230	Sophomore	Transfer
Crew Wakley	DB	6'0"	200	Junior	Transfer
Tyler West	WR	5'10"	165	Freshman	Transfer
Dallin Havea	DL	6'2"	275	Freshman	Transfer
Aisea Moa	LB	6'2"	235	Sophomore	Transfer
Dallin Johnson	DL	6'3"	295	Freshman	Transfer
Prince Zombo	WR	6'0"	190	Freshman	Transfer
Noah Lugo	QB	6'2"	195	Freshman	Transfer
David Latu	DL	6'4"	305	Junior	Transfer
Sione Moa	LB	6'1"	230	Junior	Transfer
Jake Eichorn	OL	6'5"	300	Junior	Transfer
Malae Tanuvasa	DB	6'0"	190	Sophomore	Transfer
Weston Jones	OL	6'5"	295	Freshman	Transfer
Nuuletau Sellesin	OL	6'1"	260	Junior	Transfer
Carson Tujague	DL	6'3"	235	Freshman	Transfer
Nathan Hoke	LB	6'3"	235	Freshman	Transfer
Nason Coleman	TE	6'2"	230	Freshman	Transfer
Landon Rehkow	P	6'1"	190	Freshman	Transfer
Koa Eldredge	WR	5'11"	200	Sophomore	Transfer
Harrison Taggart	LB	6'1"	230	Sophomore	Transfer
Keelan Marion	WR	6'0"	195	Junior	Transfer
Chika Ebunoha	DB	6'0"	190	Sophomore	Transfer
Iosefa Letuli	DL	6'5"	255	Freshman	Transfer
Joshua Singh	DL	6'0"	285	Junior	Transfer
Jackson Nelson	DL	6'7"	280	Freshman	Transfer
Jake Retzlaff	QB	6'1"	205	Junior	Transfer
Pokaiaua Haunga	RB	5'11"	200	Freshman	Transfer
Ryner Swanson	TE	6'4"	245	Freshman	Mission
Cannon Skidmore	DS	6'2"	200	Freshman	Mission
David Clifford	OL	6'4"	285	Freshman	Mission
Marquis Taliulu	WR	6'4"	220	Junior	
Weston Covey	WR	5'11"	185	Freshman	
Luke To'omalatai	DL	6'2"	315	Junior	
Petey Tuipulotu	LB	6'3"	195	Sophomore	

== Schedule ==
Date	Time	Opponent	Rank	Site	TV	Result	Attendance
August 30	6:00 p.m.	Portland State*		LaVell Edwards Stadium; Provo, UT	ESPN+	W 69–0	64,494
September 6	8:15 p.m.	Stanford*		LaVell Edwards Stadium; Provo, UT	ESPN	W 27–3	64,692
September 20	5:30 p.m.	at East Carolina*		Dowdy–Ficklen Stadium; Greenville, NC	ESPN2	W 34–13	47,213
September 27	8:15 p.m.	at Colorado	No. 25	Folsom Field; Boulder, CO	ESPN	W 24–21	52,265
October 3	8:30 p.m.	West Virginia	No. 23	LaVell Edwards Stadium; Provo, UT	ESPN	W 38–24	63,917
October 11	6:00 p.m.	at Arizona	No. 18	Arizona Stadium; Tucson, AZ	ESPN2	W 33–27 ^{2OT}	47,960
October 18	6:00 p.m.	No. 23 Utah^{†}	No. 15	LaVell Edwards Stadium; Provo, UT (Holy War, Big Noon Kickoff)	FOX	W 24–21	64,794
October 25	1:30 p.m.	at Iowa State	No. 11	Jack Trice Stadium; Ames, IA	FOX	W 41–27	61,500
November 8	10:00 a.m.	at No. 8 Texas Tech	No. 7	Jones AT&T Stadium; Lubbock, TX (College GameDay)	ABC	L 7–29	60,229
November 15	8:15 p.m.	TCU	No. 12	LaVell Edwards Stadium; Provo, UT	ESPN	W 44–13	64,447
November 22	6:00 p.m.	at Cincinnati	No. 11	Nippert Stadium; Cincinnati, OH (Big Noon Kickoff)	FOX	W 26–14	38,034
November 29	11:00 a.m.	UCF	No. 11	LaVell Edwards Stadium; Provo, UT	ESPN2	W 41–21	60,389
December 6	10:00 a.m.	vs. No. 4 Texas Tech	No. 11	AT&T Stadium; Arlington, TX (Big 12 Championship Game)	ABC	L 7–34	85,519
December 27	1:30 p.m.	vs. No. 22 Georgia Tech*	No. 12	Camping World Stadium; Orlando, FL (Pop-Tarts Bowl)	ABC	W 25–21	34,126
*Non-conference game; ^{†}Homecoming; Rankings from AP Poll (and CFP Rankings, after November 4) - Released prior to game; All times are in Mountain time

== Game summaries ==
=== vs Portland State (FCS) ===
Portland State Vikings (FCS) (0–1) at BYU Cougars (0–0) – Game summary

Quarter	1	2	3	4	Total
Vikings (FCS)	0	0	0	0	0
Cougars	14	35	6	14	69

at LaVell Edwards Stadium • Provo, UT

- Date: August 30
- Game time: 6:00 p.m. MDT
- Game weather: Cloudy, 82 °F (28 °C), Winds 9mph SE
- Game attendance: 64,494
- Referee: Tutashinda Salaam
- TV announcers (ESPN+): Mike Corey and Brad Hopkins

Game information

First quarter

- BYU – Jack Kelly 54-yard blocked field goal return (Will Ferrin kick), 3:58. BYU 7–0.
- BYU – Chase Roberts 4-yard pass from Bear Bachmeier (Will Ferrin kick), 0:00. BYU 14–0. Drive: 4 plays, 56 yards, 2:23.

Second quarter

- BYU – Noah Moeaki 5-yard pass from Bear Bachmeier (Will Ferrin kick), 9:52. BYU 21–0. Drive: 7 plays, 48 yards, 2:55.
- BYU – Cody Hagen 57-yard run (Will Ferrin kick), 6:53. BYU 28–0. Drive: 4 plays, 84 yards, 1:53.
- BYU – Bear Bachmeier 4-yard run (Will Ferrin kick), 6:15. BYU 35–0. Drive: 2 plays, 6 yards, 0:25.
- BYU – Carsen Ryan 22-yard pass from Bear Bachmeier (Will Ferrin kick), 3:35. BYU 42–0. Drive: 4 plays, 91 yards, 1:24.
- BYU – Bear Bachmeier 12-yard run (Will Ferrin kick), 0:49. BYU 49–0. Drive: 4 plays, 58 yards, 1:05.

Third quarter

- BYU – Will Ferrin 25-yard field goal, 6:33. BYU 52–0. Drive: 15 plays, 68 yards, 8:27.
- BYU – Will Ferrin 56-yard field goal, 2:09. BYU 55–0. Drive: 6 plays, 12 yards, 3:11.

Fourth quarter

- BYU – Dominique McKenzie 41-yard run (Will Ferrin kick), 14:51. BYU 62–0. Drive: 2 plays, 53 yards, 0:13.
- BYU – Charles Miska 5-yard run (Will Ferrin kick), 1:55. BYU 69–0. Drive: 15 plays, 79 yards, 10:21.

Statistics	PRST	BYU
First downs	3	28
Plays–yards	44–51	66–606
Rushes–yards	24–(-5)	48–468
Passing yards	56	138
Passing: comp–att–int	10–20–0	12–18–0
Turnovers	1	1
Time of possession	25:38	34:22

Team	Category	Player	Statistics
Portland State	Passing	CJ Jordan	8/14, 58 yards
Portland State	Rushing	Jacques Badolato-Birdsell	12 carries, 28 yards
Portland State	Receiving	Kristian Ingman	1 reception, 20 yards
BYU	Passing	Bear Bachmeier	7/11, 97 yards, 3 TD
BYU	Rushing	LJ Martin	8 carries, 131 yards
BYU	Receiving	Carsen Ryan	2 receptions, 47 yards, TD

=== vs Stanford ===
Stanford Cardinal (0–1) at BYU Cougars (1–0) – Game summary

Quarter	1	2	3	4	Total
Cardinal	0	0	0	3	3
Cougars	6	8	10	3	27

at LaVell Edwards Stadium • Provo, UT

- Date: September 6
- Game time: 8:15 p.m. MDT
- Game weather: Clear Skies, 74 °F (23 °C), Winds 3mph NE
- Game attendance: 64,692
- Referee: Nate Black
- TV announcers (ESPN): Mark Jones, Roddy Jones, and Quint Kessenich

Game information

First quarter

- BYU – Bear Bachmeier 2-yard run, (run failed), 3:25. BYU 6–0. Drive: 6 plays, 85 yards, 3:16.

Second quarter

- BYU – Will Ferrin 36-yard field goal, 14:56. BYU 9–0. Drive: 3 plays, 1 yard, 2:03.
- BYU – Will Ferrin 30-yard field goal, 10:52. BYU 12–0. Drive: 5 plays, -7 yards, 1:59.
- BYU – Team safety, 5:14. BYU 14–0.

Third quarter

- BYU – Will Ferrin 21-yard field goal, 8:56. BYU 17–0. Drive: 13 plays, 72 yards, 6:04.
- BYU – Sione Moa 8-yard run (Will Ferrin kick), 3:36. BYU 24–0. Drive: 5 plays, 43 yards, 2:21.

Fourth quarter

- STAN – Emmet Kenney 26-yard field goal, 10:31. BYU 24–3. Drive: 15 plays, 67 yards, 8:05.
- BYU – Will Ferrin 23-yard field goal, 6:33. BYU 27–3. Drive: 8 plays, 69 yards, 3:58.

Statistics	STAN	BYU
First downs	12	18
Plays–yards	56–161	68–332
Rushing yards	19	157
Passing yards	142	175
Passing: comp–att–int	17–32–2	17–27
Turnovers	3	0
Time of possession	25:04	34:56

Team	Category	Player	Statistics
Stanford	Passing	Ben Gulbranson	17/32, 142 yards, 2 INT
Stanford	Rushing	Micah Ford	12 carries, 21 yards
Stanford	Receiving	Bryce Farrell	5 receptions, 68 yards
BYU	Passing	Bear Bachmeier	17/27, 175 yards
BYU	Rushing	LJ Martin	18 carries, 110 yards
BYU	Receiving	Chase Roberts	5 receptions, 84 yards

=== at East Carolina ===
BYU Cougars (2–0) at East Carolina Pirates (2–1) – Game summary

Quarter	1	2	3	4	Total
Cougars	3	10	7	14	34
Pirates	3	0	3	7	13

at Dowdy–Ficklen Stadium • Greenville, NC

- Date: September 20
- Game time: 5:30 p.m. MDT
- Game weather: Clear Skies, 76 °F (24 °C), Winds 6mph ENE
- Game attendance: 47,213
- Referee: Cravonne Barrett
- TV announcers (ESPN2): Lowell Galindo, Aaron Murray, and Lauren Sisler

Game information

First quarter

- (9:58) BYU – Will Ferrin 40-yard field goal (Drive: 8 plays, 38 yards, 3:44; BYU 3–0)
- (0:18) ECU – Nick Mazzie 36-yard field goal (Drive: 5 plays, 36 yards, 1:35; Tied 3–3)

Second quarter

- (10:50) BYU – Will Ferrin 23-yard field goal (Drive: 9 plays, 74 yards, 4:18; BYU 6–3)
- (0:56) BYU – Evan Johnson 4-yard interception return, Will Ferrin kick (BYU 13–3)

Third quarter

- (6:33) BYU – Carsen Ryan 20-yard pass from Bear Bachmeier, Will Ferrin kick (Drive: 2 plays, 47 yards, 0:49; BYU 20–3)
- (2:27) ECU – Nick Mazzie 25-yard field goal (Drive: 14 plays, 68 yards, 4:06; BYU 20–6)

Fourth quarter

- (12:29) BYU – Bear Bachmeier 16-yard run, Will Ferrin kick (Drive: 8 plays, 52 yards, 4:51; BYU 27–6)
- (8:11) ECU – Katin Houser 2-yard run, Nick Mazzie kick (Drive: 12 plays, 97 yards, 4:18; BYU 27–13)
- (3:44) BYU – LJ Martin 41-yard run, Will Ferrin kick (Drive: 9 plays, 75 yards, 4:27; BYU 34–13)

Statistics	BYU	ECU
First downs	20	24
Plays–yards	60–418	77–404
Rushes–yards	34–172	35–119
Passing yards	246	285
Passing: comp–att–int	18–26–0	25–42–2
Turnovers	0	2
Time of possession	31:39	28:21

Team	Category	Player	Statistics
BYU	Passing	Bear Bachmeier	18/25, 246 yards, TD
BYU	Rushing	LJ Martin	14 carries, 101 yards, TD
BYU	Receiving	Chase Roberts	5 receptions, 97 yards
East Carolina	Passing	Katin Houser	25/42, 285 yards, 2 INT
East Carolina	Rushing	London Montgomery	6 carries, 43 yards
East Carolina	Receiving	Yannick Smith	9 receptions, 38 yards

=== at Colorado ===
No. 25 BYU Cougars (3–0) at Colorado Buffaloes (2–2) – Game summary

Quarter	1	2	3	4	Total
No. 25 Cougars	3	7	7	7	24
Buffaloes	14	0	7	0	21

at Folsom Field • Boulder, CO

- Date: September 27
- Game time: 8:15 p.m. MDT
- Game weather: Clear Skies, 64 °F (18 °C), Winds 7mph SW
- Game attendance: 52,265
- Referee: Mike McCabe
- TV announcers (ESPN): Mark Jones, Roddy Jones, and Quint Kessenich

Game information

First quarter

- (9:44) COLO – Kaidon Salter 3-yard run, Alejandro Mata kick (Drive: 11 plays, 75 yards, 5:16; Colorado 7–0)
- (6:31) COLO – Dre'lon Miller 5-yard run, Alejandro Mata kick (Drive: 4 plays, 62 yards, 1:23; Colorado 14–0)
- (0:45) BYU – Will Ferrin 28-yard field goal (Drive: 8 plays, 65 yards, 4:23; Colorado 14–3)

Second quarter

- (0:46) BYU – Chase Roberts 5-yard pass from Bear Bachmeier, Will Ferrin kick (Drive: 10 plays, 94 yards, 3:24; Colorado 14–10)

Third quarter

- (5:26) BYU – Chase Roberts 4-yard pass from Bear Bachmeier, Will Ferrin kick (Drive: 9 plays, 74 yards, 4:51; BYU 17–14)
- (2:42) COLO – Dre'lon Miller 19-yard pass from Kaidon Salter, Alejandro Mata kick (Drive: 6 plays, 75 yards, 2:44; Colorado 21–17)

Fourth quarter

- (14:02) BYU – Cody Hagen 32-yard run, Will Ferrin kick (Drive: 8 plays, 77 yards, 3:33; BYU 24–21)

Statistics	BYU	COLO
First downs	27	17
Plays–yards	65–387	53–291
Rushes–yards	36–208	37–172
Passing yards	179	119
Passing: comp–att–int	19–27–0	11–16–1
Turnovers	0	1
Time of possession	33:35	26:25

Team	Category	Player	Statistics
BYU	Passing	Bear Bachmeier	19/27, 179 yards, 2 TD
BYU	Rushing	Bear Bachmeier	15 carries, 98 yards
BYU	Receiving	Chase Roberts	5 receptions, 49 yards, 2 TD
Colorado	Passing	Kaidon Salter	11/16, 119 yards, TD, INT
Colorado	Rushing	Micah Welch	11 carries, 67 yards
Colorado	Receiving	Joseph Williams	5 receptions, 56 yards

=== vs West Virginia ===
West Virginia Mountaineers (2–3) at No. 23 BYU Cougars (4–0) – Game summary

Quarter	1	2	3	4	Total
Mountaineers	0	10	7	7	24
No. 23 Cougars	14	14	3	7	38

at LaVell Edwards Stadium • Provo, UT

- Date: October 3
- Game time: 8:30 p.m. MDT
- Game weather: Cloudy with showers on and off, 68 °F (20 °C), Winds 3mph NW
- Game attendance: 63,917
- Referee: David Alvarez
- TV announcers (ESPN): Anish Shroff, Andre Ware, and Paul Carcaterra
  (Gridiron Radio): Noah Britt, Jon Reynolds, and Robbie Bullough

Game information

First quarter

- BYU – 9:14 Parker Kingston 1-yard run (Will Ferrin kick). BYU 7–0. Drive: 1 play, 1 yard, 0:05.
- BYU – 3:41 Parker Kingston 54-yard pass from Bear Bachmeier (Will Ferrin kick). BYU 14–0. Drive: 3 plays, 57 yards, 1:16.

Second quarter

- WVU – 14:15 Kade Hensley 45-yd field goal. BYU 14–3. Drive: 9 plays, 48 yards, 4:26.
- BYU – 5:17 LJ Martin 4-yard run (Will Ferrin kick). BYU 21–3. Drive: 2 plays, 89 yards, 0:54.
- WVU – 1:58 Diore Hubbard 3-yard run (Kade Hensley kick). BYU 21–10. Drive: 1 play, 3 yards, 0:04.
- BYU – 0:19 Bear Bachmeier 2-yard run (Will Ferrin kick). BYU 28–10. Drive: 9 plays, 73 yards, 1:31.

Third quarter

- BYU – 6:53 Will Ferrin 37-yard field goal. BYU 31–10. Drive: 15 plays, 55 yards, 7:59.
- WVU – 0:37 Khalil Wilkins 6-yard run (Kade Hensley kick). BYU 31–17. Drive: 5 plays, 22 yards, 1:55.

Fourth quarter

- BYU – 8:50 LJ Martin 1-yard run (Will Ferrin kick).BYU 38–17. Drive: 12 plays, 75 yards, 6:42.
- WVU – 1:14 Cam Vaughn 29-yard pass from Scotty Fox Jr (Kade Hensley kick). BYU 38–24. Drive: 3 plays, 54 yards, 0:36.

Statistics	WVU	BYU
First downs	18	22
Plays–yards	65–291	67–516
Rushes–yards	47–156	42–165
Passing yards	135	351
Passing: comp–att–int	10–18–2	18–25–1
Turnovers	2	3
Time of possession	27:50	32:10

Team	Category	Player	Statistics
West Virginia	Passing	Khalil Wilkins	7/15, 81 yards, 2 INT
West Virginia	Rushing	Khalil Wilkins	23 carries, 89 yards, TD
West Virginia	Receiving	Cam Vaughn	2 receptions, 43 yards, TD
BYU	Passing	Bear Bachmeier	18/25, 351 yards, TD, INT
BYU	Rushing	LJ Martin	21 carries, 90 yards, 2 TD
BYU	Receiving	Chase Roberts	4 receptions, 161 yards

=== at Arizona ===
No. 18 BYU Cougars (5–0) at Arizona Wildcats (4–1) – Game summary

Quarter	1	2	3	4	OT	2OT	Total
No. 18 Cougars	14	0	0	10	3	6	33
Wildcats	7	10	0	7	3	0	27

at Arizona Stadium • Tucson, AZ

- Date: October 11
- Game time: 6:00 p.m. MDT
- Game weather: 76 °F (24 °C), Winds 4mph SE, 100% of rain
- Game attendance: 47,960
- Referee: Michael Vandervelde
- TV announcers (ESPN2): Mike Couzens, Kirk Morrison, and Dawn Davenport

Game information

First quarter

- (8:55) BYU – LJ Martin 28-yard run, Will Ferrin kick (Drive: 8 plays, 66 yards, 3:21; BYU 7–0)
- (4:15) BYU – Parker Kingston 75-yard pass from Bear Bachmeier, Will Ferrin kick (Drive: 4 plays, 94 yards, 2:18; BYU 14–0)
- (0:32) ARIZ – Kris Hutson 17-yard pass from Noah Fifita, Michael Salgado-Medina kick (Drive: 8 plays, 75 yards, 3:43; BYU 14–7)

Second quarter

- (9:32) ARIZ – Michael Salgado-Medina 24-yard field goal (Drive: 10 plays, 38 yards, 3:19; BYU 14–10)
- (0:40) ARIZ – Chris Hunter 35-yard pass from Noah Fifita, Michael Salgado-Medina kick (Drive: 8 plays, 76 yards, 1:58; Arizona 17–14)

Third quarter

- None

Fourth quarter

- (11:14) ARIZ – Kedrick Reescano 36-yard run, Michael Salgado-Medina kick (Drive: 10 plays, 74 yards, 4:02; Arizona 24–14)
- (4:08) BYU – Will Ferrin 24-yard field goal (Drive: 15 plays, 69 yards, 7:06; Arizona 24–17)
- (0:19) BYU – Bear Bachmeier 2-yard run, Will Ferrin kick (Drive: 11 plays, 47 yards, 2:36; Tied 24–24)

First overtime

- ARIZ – Michael Salgado-Medina 23-yard field goal. (Drive: 6 plays, 20 yards; Arizona 27–24)
- BYU – Will Ferrin 45-yard field goal. (Drive: 4 plays, -2 yards; Tied 27–27)

Second overtime

- BYU – Bear Bachmeier 7-yard run, two-point pass failed (Drive: 5 plays, 25 yards; BYU 33–27)

Statistics	BYU	ARIZ
First downs	23	23
Plays–yards	80–430	79–383
Rushes–yards	51–258	34–164
Passing yards	172	219
Passing: comp–att–int	12–29–2	25–45–1
Turnovers	2	1
Time of possession	32:47	27:13

Team	Category	Player	Statistics
BYU	Passing	Bear Bachmeier	12/29, 172 yards, TD, 2 INT
BYU	Rushing	LJ Martin	25 carries, 162 yards, TD
BYU	Receiving	Parker Kingston	5 receptions, 117 yards, TD
Arizona	Passing	Noah Fifita	25/45, 219 yards, 2 TD, INT
Arizona	Rushing	Kedrick Reescano	13 carries, 90 yards, TD
Arizona	Receiving	Kris Hutson	9 receptions, 106 yards, TD

=== vs No. 23 Utah (Holy War) ===
No. 23 Utah Utes (5–1) at No. 15 BYU Cougars (6–0) – Game summary

Quarter	1	2	3	4	Total
No. 23 Utes	0	7	0	14	21
No. 15 Cougars	0	10	0	14	24

at LaVell Edwards Stadium • Provo, UT

- Date: October 18
- Game time: 6:00 p.m. MDT
- Game weather: Sunny and clear, 63 °F (17 °C), Winds 3mph NE
- Game attendance: 64,794
- Referee: Henry Johns
- TV announcers (FOX): Jason Benetti, Robert Griffin III, and Alexa Landestoy
  (Gridiron Radio): Noah Britt, Jon Reynolds, and Robbie Bullough

Game information

First quarter

- No scoring plays.

Second quarter

- (13:37) BYU – Chase Roberts 17-yard pass from Bear Bachmeier, Will Ferrin kick (Drive: 6 plays, 81 yards, 3:00; BYU 7–0)
- (3:24) UTAH – Ryan Davis 11-yard pass from Devon Dampier, Dillon Curtis kick (Drive: 9 plays, 85 yards, 3:54; Tied 7–7)
- (0:03) BYU – Will Ferrin 26-yard field goal (Drive: 10 plays, 33 yards, 2:18; BYU 10–7)

Third quarter

- No scoring plays.

Fourth quarter

- (14:15) UTAH – Daniel Bray 49-yard run, Dillon Curtis kick (Drive: 9 plays, 90 yards, 4:12; Utah 14–10)
- (11:19) BYU – Parker Kingston 12-yard run, Will Ferrin kick (Drive: 5 plays, 81 yards, 2:46; BYU 17–14)
- (4:22) BYU – Bear Bachmeier 22-yard run, Will Ferrin kick (Drive: 8 plays, 64 yards, 5:02; BYU 24–14)
- (1:24) UTAH – Larry Simmons 2-yard pass from Devon Dampier, Dillon Curtis kick (Drive: 5 plays, 77 yards, 1:21; BYU 24–21)

Statistics	UTAH	BYU
First downs	25	23
Plays–yards	73–470	66–368
Rushes–yards	37–226	42–202
Passing yards	244	166
Passing: comp–att–int	20–36–1	13–24–0
Turnovers	2	0
Time of possession	28:53	31:07

Team	Category	Player	Statistics
Utah	Passing	Devon Dampier	20/36, 244 yards, 2 TD, INT
Utah	Rushing	Daniel Bray	10 carries, 121 yards
Utah	Receiving	Ryan Davis	7 receptions, 66 yards, TD
BYU	Passing	Bear Bachmeier	13/22, 166 yards, TD
BYU	Rushing	LJ Martin	26 carries, 122 yards
BYU	Receiving	Parker Kingston	4 receptions, 50 yards

=== at Iowa State ===
No. 11 BYU Cougars (7–0) at Iowa State Cyclones (5–2) – Game summary

Quarter	1	2	3	4	Total
No. 11 Cougars	7	10	10	14	41
Cyclones	17	7	3	0	27

at Jack Trice Stadium • Ames, IA

- Date: October 25
- Game time: 1:30 p.m. MDT
- Game weather: Cloudy, 55 °F (13 °C), Winds 12mph SE
- Game attendance: 61,500
- Referee: Mike McCabe
- TV announcers (FOX): Jason Benetti, Robert Griffin III, and Alexa Landestoy;
  (Compass Media): Gregg Daniels and Chad Brown

Game information

First quarter

- ISU – 14:51 Brett Eskildsen 75-yard pass from Rocco Becht (Kyle Konrardy kick). ISU 7–0. Drive: 1 play, 75 yards, 0:09.
- BYU – 12:13 LJ Martin 4-yard run (Will Ferrin kick). TIED 7–7. Drive: 5 plays, 68 yards, 2:32.
- ISU – 8:05 Kyle Konrardy 36-yard Field Goal. ISU 10–7. Drive: 11 plays, 57 yards, 4:08.
- ISU – 1:00 Carson Hansen 2-yard run (Kyle Konrardy kick). ISU 17–7. Drive: 9 plays, 60 yards, 4:24.

Second quarter

- BYU – 8:59 Will Ferrin 50-yard Field Goal. ISU 17-10. Drive: 7 plays, 42 yards, 2:11.
- ISU – 1:52 Carson Hansen 3-yard run (Kyle Konrardy kick). ISU 24–10. Drive: 12 plays, 80 yards, 7:02.
- BYU – 0:25 Parker Kingston 12-yard pass from Bear Bachmeier (Will Ferrin kick). ISU 24–17. Drive: 10 plays, 60 yards, 1:20.

Third quarter

- BYU – 10:52 Will Ferrin 27-yard Field Goal. ISU 24-20. Drive: 11 plays, 57 yards, 4:08.
- BYU – 4:33 Bear Bachmeier 9-yard run (Will Ferrin kick). BYU 27–24. Drive: 11 plays, 79 yards, 4:28.
- ISU – 1:43 Kyle Konrardy 43-yard Field Goal. TIED 27–27. Drive: 5 plays, 50 yards, 2:46.

Fourth quarter

- BYU – 14:21 Parker Kingston 27-yard pass from Bear Bachmeier (Will Ferrin kick). BYU 34–27. Drive: 3 plays, 33 yards, 0:44.
- BYU – 13:40 Faletau Satuala 40-yard interception return (Will Ferrin kick). BYU 41–27.

Statistics	BYU	ISU
First downs	17	24
Plays–yards	64–410	70–495
Rushes–yards	28–103	34–184
Passing yards	307	311
Passing: comp–att–int	22–35–0	24–36–3
Turnovers	0	4
Time of possession	27:50	32:10

Team	Category	Player	Statistics
BYU	Passing	Bear Bachmeier	22/35, 307 yards, 2 TD
BYU	Rushing	Bear Bachmeier	12 carries, 49 yards, TD
BYU	Receiving	Parker Kingston	7 receptions, 133 yards, 2 TD
Iowa State	Passing	Rocco Becht	24/36, 311 yards, TD, 3 INT
Iowa State	Rushing	Carson Hansen	16 carries, 152 yards, 2 TD
Iowa State	Receiving	Benjamin Brahmer	5 receptions, 75 yards

=== at No. 8 Texas Tech ===
No. 7 BYU Cougars (8–0) at No. 8 Texas Tech Red Raiders (8–1) – Game summary

Quarter	1	2	3	4	Total
No. 7 Cougars	0	0	0	7	7
No. 8 Red Raiders	10	3	6	10	29

at Jones AT&T Stadium • Lubbock, TX

- Date: November 8
- Game time: 10:00 a.m. MST
- Game weather: Sunny, 69 °F (21 °C), Winds 9mph N but gusting 20+
- Game attendance: 60,229
- Referee: Kevin Mar
- TV announcers (ABC): Chris Fowler, Kirk Herbstreit, and Holly Rowe
  (Elite Media): Mike Morgan and Brian Baldinger

Game information
First quarter
- TTU – Stone Harrington 47-yard field goal, 10:07. Red Raiders 3–0. Drive: 4 plays, -12 yards, 1:24.
- TTU – Caleb Douglas 9-yard pass from Behren Morton (Stone Harrington kick), 0:19. Red Raiders 10–0. Drive: 12 plays, 92 yards, 5:01.

Second quarter

- TTU – Stone Harrington 27-yard field goal, 8:08. Red Raiders 13–0. Drive: 8 plays, 59 yards, 2:25.

Third quarter

- TTU – Stone Harrington 39-yard field goal, 7:00. Red Raiders 16–0. Drive: 12 plays, 59 yards, 4:10.
- TTU – Stone Harrington 29-yard field goal, 3:41. Red Raiders 19–0. Drive: 6 plays, 11 yards, 2:03.

Fourth quarter

- TTU – Cameron Dickey 1-yard run (Stone Harrington kick), 10:46. Red Raiders 26–0. Drive: 9 plays, 80 yards, 4:04.
- BYU – Chase Roberts 6-yard pass from Bear Bachmeier (Will Ferrin kick), 7:35. Red Raiders 26–7. Drive: 8 plays, 57 yards, 3:11.
- TTU – Stone Harrington 34-yard field goal, 2:37. Red Raiders 29–7. Drive: 4 plays, 0 yards, 1:03.

Statistics	BYU	TTU
First downs	14	17
Plays–yards	65–255	75–368
Rushes–yards	27–67	43–149
Passing yards	188	219
Passing: comp–att–int	23–28–1	17–32–0
Turnovers	3	0
Time of possession	30:35	29:25

Team	Category	Player	Statistics
BYU	Passing	Bear Bachmeier	23/38, 188 yards, TD, INT
BYU	Rushing	LJ Martin	10 carries, 35 yards
BYU	Receiving	Chase Roberts	6 receptions, 61 yards, TD
Texas Tech	Passing	Behren Morton	17/32, 219 yards, TD
Texas Tech	Rushing	Cameron Dickey	23 carries, 121 yards, TD
Texas Tech	Receiving	Coy Eakin	4 receptions, 52 yards

=== vs TCU ===
TCU Horned Frogs (6–3) at No. 12 BYU Cougars (8–1) – Game summary

Quarter	1	2	3	4	Total
Horned Frogs	0	10	3	0	13
No. 12 Cougars	10	17	3	14	44

at LaVell Edwards Stadium • Provo, UT

- Date: November 15
- Game time: 8:15 p.m. MST
- Game weather: Clear, 55 °F (13 °C), Winds 3mph NE
- Game attendance: 64,447
- Referee: Tutashinda Salaam
- TV announcers (ESPN): Dave Flemming, Brock Osweiler, and Stormy Buonantony;
  (Gridiron Radio): Noah Britt, Jon Reynolds, and Robbie Bullough

Game information

First quarter

- BYU – 10:27 Will Ferrin 52-yard field goal. BYU 3-0. Drive: 10 plays, 45 yards, 3:47.
- BYU – 2:13 Parker Kingston 11-yard run (Will Ferrin kick). BYU 10–0. Drive: 10 plays, 91 yards, 6:02.

Second quarter

- BYU – 10:16 Bear Bachmeier 17-yard run (Will Ferrin kick). BYU 17–0. Drive: 10 plays, 75 yards, 5:44.
- TCU – 7:17 Nate McCashland 22-yard field goal. BYU 17-3. Drive: 8 plays, 70 yards, 2:59.
- BYU – 6:00 Carsen Ryan 43-yard pass from Bear Bachmeier (Will Ferrin kick). BYU 24–3. Drive: 4 plays, 75 yards, 1:03.
- TCU – 1:14 Jon Denman 13-yard run (Nate McCashland kick). BYU 24–10. Drive: 10 plays, 75 yards, 4:46.
- BYU – 0:00 Will Ferrin 35-yard field goal. BYU 27-10. Drive: 10 plays, 58 yards, 1:14.

Third quarter

- TCU – 10:13 Nate McCashland 33-yard field goal. BYU 27-13. Drive: 11 plays, 59 yards, 4:47.
- BYU – 4:08 Will Ferrin 29-yard field goal. BYU 30-13. Drive: 12 plays, 64 yards, 6:05.

Fourth quarter

- BYU – 13:36 LJ Martin 1-yard run (Will Ferrin kick). BYU 37–13. Drive: 8 plays, 43 yards, 4:33.
- BYU – 4:09 Tanner Wall 68-yard interception return (Will Ferrin kick). BYU 44–13.

Statistics	TCU	BYU
First downs	15	28
Plays–yards	57–298	72–447
Rushes–yards	34–115	39–151
Passing yards	183	296
Passing: comp–att–int	10–23–2	23–33–0
Turnovers	2	1
Time of possession	23:55	36:05

Team	Category	Player	Statistics
TCU	Passing	Josh Hoover	10/23, 183 yards, 2 INT
TCU	Rushing	Jeremy Payne	9 carries, 55 yards
TCU	Receiving	Eric McAlister	4 receptions, 107 yards
BYU	Passing	Bear Bachmeier	23/33, 296 yards, TD
BYU	Rushing	LJ Martin	21 carries, 88 yards, TD
BYU	Receiving	Parker Kingston	5 receptions, 80 yards

=== at Cincinnati ===
No. 11 BYU Cougars (9–1) at Cincinnati Bearcats (7–3) – Game summary

Quarter	1	2	3	4	Total
No. 11 Cougars	7	3	7	9	26
Bearcats	0	7	0	7	14

at Nippert Stadium • Cincinnati, OH

- Date: November 22
- Game time: 6:00 p.m. MST
- Game weather: Clear, 43 °F (6 °C), Winds 1mph SE
- Game attendance: 38,034
- Referee: Mike McCabe
- TV announcers (FOX): Jason Benetti, Robert Griffin III, and Alexa Landestoy
  (Gridiron Radio): Noah Britt, Jon Reynolds, and Robbie Bullough

Game information

First quarter

- BYU – 4:39 Bear Bachmeier 6-yard run (Will Ferrin kick). BYU 7–0. Drive: 10 plays, 50 yards, 5:13.

Second quarter

- CIN – 6:34 Cyrus Allen 27-yard pass from Brendan Sorsby (Stephen Rusnack kick). TIED 7–7. Drive: 2 plays, 33 yards, 0:52.
- BYU – 1:56 Will Ferrin 31-yard Field Goal. BYU 10-7. Drive: 11 plays, 61 yards, 4:38.

Third quarter

- BYU – 8:26 LJ Martin 1-yard run (Will Ferrin kick). BYU 17–7. Drive: 11 plays, 66 yards, 5:24.

Fourth quarter

- BYU – 14:07 Will Ferrin 32-yard Field Goal. BYU 20-7. Drive: 12 plays, 56 yards, 6:06.
- CIN – 4:37 Jeff Caldwell 19-yard pass from Brendan Sorsby (Stephen Rusnack kick). BYU 20–14. Drive: 8 plays, 86 yards, 3:14.
- BYU – 0:56 LJ Martin 33-yard run (Bear Bachmeier 2-pt pass intercepted). BYU 26–14. Drive: 9 plays, 75 yards, 3:34.

Statistics	BYU	CIN
First downs	24	19
Plays–yards	74–392	61–387
Rushes–yards	49–265	23–87
Passing yards	127	300
Passing: comp–att–int	15–25–0	25–38–1
Turnovers	0	2
Time of possession	38:25	21:35

Team	Category	Player	Statistics
BYU	Passing	Bear Bachmeier	15/25, 127 yards
BYU	Rushing	LJ Martin	32 carries, 222 yards, 2 TD
BYU	Receiving	LJ Martin	3 receptions, 44 yards
Cincinnati	Passing	Brendan Sorsby	25/38, 300 yards, 2 TD, INT
Cincinnati	Rushing	Brendan Sorsby	8 carries, 38 yards
Cincinnati	Receiving	Cyrus Allen	2 receptions, 51 yards, TD

=== vs UCF ===
UCF Knights (5-6) at No. 11 BYU Cougars (10-1) – Game summary

Quarter	1	2	3	4	Total
Knights	14	0	7	0	21
No. 11 Cougars	0	17	21	3	41

at LaVell Edwards Stadium • Provo, UT

- Date: November 29
- Game time: 11:00 a.m. MST
- Game weather: Partly Cloudy, 40 °F (4 °C), Winds 1mph SE
- Game attendance: 60,389
- Referee: Michael Vandervelde
- TV announcers (ESPN2): Matt Schumacker, Dustin Fox, & Sherree Burruss

Game information

First quarter

- UCF – Dylan Wade 4-yard pass from Tayven Jackson (Noe Ruelas kick), 9:27, Knights 7–0. Drive: 11 plays, 75 yards, 5:33.
- UCF – Agyeman Addae 20-yard pass from Tayven Jackson (Noe Ruelas kick), 3:39, Knights 14–0. Drive: 7 plays, 52 yards, 3:40.

Second quarter

- BYU – LJ Martin 1-yard run (Will Ferrin kick), 13:34, Knights 14–7. Drive: 9 plays, 65 yards, 4:59.
- BYU – LJ Martin 1-yard run (Will Ferrin kick), 4:54, Tied 14–14. Drive: 7 plays, 54 yards, 4:01.
- BYU – Will Ferrin 26-yard field goal, 0:09, Cougars 17–14. Drive: 10 plays, 72 yards, 1:51.

Third quarter

- BYU – LJ Martin 4-yard run (Will Ferrin kick), 8:54, Cougars 24–14. Drive: 10 plays, 75 yards, 6:06.
- BYU – Parker Kingston 55-yard punt return (Will Ferrin kick), 7:13, Cougars 31–14.
- UCF – Tayven Jackson 4-yard pass from Agyeman Addae (Noe Ruelas kick), 3:39, Cougars 31–21. Drive: 10 plays, 80 yards, 3:42.
- BYU – Parker Kingston 46-yard pass from Bear Bachmeier (Will Ferrin kick), 0:47, Cougars 38–21. Drive: 6 plays, 75 yards, 2:37.

Fourth quarter

- BYU – Will Ferrin 50-yard field goal, 3:53, Cougars 41–14. Drive: 7 plays, 30 yards, 3:44.

Statistics	UCF	BYU
First downs	15	21
Plays–yards	60–296	65–407
Rushes–yards	19–42	40–118
Passing yards	254	289
Passing: comp–att–int	24–41–1	21–25–0
Turnovers	2	0
Time of possession	24:52	35:08

Team	Category	Player	Statistics
UCF	Passing	Tayven Jackson	21/37, 3232 yards, 2 TD
UCF	Rushing	Myles Montgomery	7 carries, 29 yards
UCF	Receiving	Duane Thomas Jr.	4 receptions, 74 yards
BYU	Passing	Bear Bachmeier	21/25, 289 yards, TD
BYU	Rushing	LJ Martin	22 carries, 95 yards, 3 TD
BYU	Receiving	Parker Kingston	6 receptions, 126 yards, TD

=== Big 12 Championship: vs. Texas Tech ===
Big 12 Championship: No. 11 BYU Cougars vs. No. 4 Texas Tech Red Raiders – Game summary

Quarter	1	2	3	4	Total
No. 11 Cougars	7	0	0	0	7
No. 4 Red Raiders	0	13	8	13	34

at AT&T Stadium • Arlington, TX

- Date: December 6
- Game time: 10:00 a.m. MST
- Game weather: Indoors
- Game attendance: 85,519
- Referee: Kevin Mar
- TV announcers (ABC): Joe Tessitore, Jesse Palmer, Katie George and Kris Budden
  (ESPN Radio): Mike Couzens, Max Starks, & Mike Peasley

Game information
First quarter
- BYU – LJ Martin 10-yard run (Will Ferrin kick), 4:58. Cougars 7–0. Drive: 14 plays, 90 yards, 6:50.

Second quarter

- TTU – Stone Harrrington 23-yard field goal, 14:56. Cougars 7–3. Drive: 11 plays, 70 yards, 5:02.
- TTU – Coy Eakin 33-yard pass from Behren Morton (Stone Harrington kick), 10:42. Red Raiders 10–7. Drive: 7 plays, 61 yards, 2:34.
- TTU – Stone Harrington 40-yard field goal, 0:21. Red Raiders 13–7. Drive: 7 plays, 45 yards, 1:16.

Third quarter

- TTU – Cameron Dickey 11-yard run (Behren Morton pass to Terrance Carter Jr.), 3:21. Red Raiders 21–7. Drive: 1 play, 11 yards, 0:05.

Fourth quarter

- TTU – Stone Harrington 44-yard field goal, 12:49. Red Raiders 24–7. Drive: 4 plays, -2 yards, 2:00.
- TTU – Coy Eakin 28-yard pass from Behren Morton (Stone Harrington kick), 7:04. Red Raiders 31–7. Drive: 4 plays, 37 yards, 1:59.
- TTU – Stone Harrington 28-yard field goal, 4:39. Red Raiders 34–7. Drive: 5 plays, 28 yards, 2:14.

Statistics	BYU	TTU
First downs	14	19
Plays–yards	59–200	74–374
Rushes–yards	30–63	41–159
Passing yards	137	215
Passing: comp–att–int	17-29-2	20-33-0
Turnovers	4	0
Time of possession	28:06	31:54

Team	Category	Player	Statistics
BYU	Passing	Bear Bachmeier	16/27, 115 yards, 2 INT
BYU	Rushing	LJ Martin	19 carries, 76 yards, TD
BYU	Receiving	Parker Kingston	4 receptions, 44 yards
Texas Tech	Passing	Behren Morton	20/33, 215 yards, 2 TD
Texas Tech	Rushing	J'Koby Williams	15 carries, 80 yards
Texas Tech	Receiving	Reggie Virgil	8 receptions, 86 yards

=== vs No. 22 Georgia Tech (Pop-Tarts Bowl) ===
2025 Pop-Tarts Bowl
No. 22 Georgia Tech Yellow Jackets (9–3) vs No. 12 BYU Cougars (11–2) – Game summary

Quarter	1	2	3	4	Total
No. 22 Yellow Jackets	7	14	0	0	21
No. 12 Cougars	7	3	0	15	25

at Camping World Stadium • Orlando, FL

- Date: December 27
- Game time: 1:40 p.m. MST
- Game weather: Clear, 76 °F (24 °C), Winds 7mph SE
- Game attendance: 34,126
- Referee: Chris Coyte
- TV announcers (ABC): Mark Jones, Roddy Jones and Quint Kessenich
  (ESPN Radio): Sean Kelley, Rene Ingoglia, & Mike Peasley

Game information

First quarter

- (4:56) BYU – Chase Roberts 7-yard pass from Bear Bachmeier (Will Ferrin kick) (Drive: 5 plays, 62 yards, 2:49; BYU 7–0)
- (0:20) GT – Trelain Maddox 3-yard run (Aidan Birr kick) (Drive: 10 plays, 75 yards, 4:36; Tied 7–7)

Second quarter

- (9:49) BYU – Will Ferrin 22-yard field goal (Drive: 12 plays, 71 yards, 5:31; BYU 10–7)
- (5:28) GT – Eric Rivers 5-yard pass from Haynes King (Aidan Birr kick) (Drive: 10 plays, 76 yards, 4:14; GT 14–10)
- (5:15) GT – J. T. Byrne 6-yard pass from Haynes King (Aidan Birr kick) (Drive: 1 play, 6 yards, 0:04; GT 21–10)

Third quarter

- No scoring plays.

Fourth quarter

- (11:13) BYU – Enoch Nawahine 2-yard run (Bear Bachmeier run for two-point conversion) (Drive: 11 plays, 80 yards, 4:42; GT 21–18)
- (2:00) BYU – Jovesa Damuni 4-yard run (Will Ferrin kick) (Drive: 9 plays, 70 yards, 3:44; BYU 25–21)

Statistics	GT	BYU
First downs	21	26
Plays–yards	68–401	63–425
Rushes–yards	28–131	24–100
Passing yards	270	325
Passing: comp–att–int	22–40–1	27–39–1
Turnovers	2	2
Time of possession	28:49	31:11

Team	Category	Player	Statistics
Georgia Tech	Passing	Haynes King	23/41, 275 yards, 2 TD, INT
Georgia Tech	Rushing	Malachi Hosley	11 carries, 63 yards
Georgia Tech	Receiving	Malik Rutherford	8 receptions, 105 yards
BYU	Passing	Bear Bachmeier	27/38, 325 yards, TD, INT
BYU	Rushing	Jovesa Damuni	7 carries, 48 yards, TD
BYU	Receiving	Carsen Ryan	8 receptions, 120 yards

== Personnel ==
=== Coaching staff ===
Name	Position
Kalani Sitake	Head coach
Jay Hill	Associate head coach/defensive coordinator/safeties coach
Kelly Poppinga	Special teams coordinator/defensive ends coach
Aaron Roderick	Offensive coordinator/quarterbacks coach
TJ Woods	Offensive line coach
Fesi Sitake	Passing game coordinator/wide receivers coach
Justin Ena	Linebackers coach
Kevin Gilbride	Tight ends coach
Jernaro Gilford	Cornerbacks coach
Harvey Unga	Running backs coach
Sione Po'uha	Defensive tackles coach

=== Roster ===
2025 BYU Cougars football team roster
Players
Coaches
Offense

Pos.	#	Name	Class
QB	47	Bear Bachmeier	Fr
QB	10	Treyson Bourguet	Jr
QB	16	Emerson Geilman	Fr
QB	17	Cole Hagen	So
QB	3	McCae Hillstead	So
OL	65	Brigham Alexander	Fr
OL	72	Joe Brown	Fr
OL	79	Kaden Chidester	So
OL	75	Andrew Gentry	Jr
OL	77	Jake Griffin	So
OL	66	Sione Hingano	Fr
OL	71	Isaiah Jatta	Sr
OL	61	Weylin Lapuaho	Sr
OL	59	Siosiua Latu-Finau	Fr
OL	55	Austin Leausa	Sr
OL	76	Jeff Lewis	Fr
OL	53	Strantz Mangisi	Fr
OL	51	Sonny Makasini	Jr
OL	73	Caden McKee	Fr
OL	63	Bruce Mitchell	Jr
OL	74	Trevin Ostler	Jr
OL	67	Trevor Pay	Fr
OL	64	Kyle Sfarcioc	Jr
OL	78	Ethan Thomason	Fr
OL	70	Ikinasio Tupuo	Fr
OL	68	Andrew Williams	Fr
RB	28	Jovesa Damuni	Fr
RB	41	Lucky Finau	So
RB	4	LJ Martin	Jr
RB	34	Charlie Miska	Fr
RB	30	Sione Moa	So
RB	21	Enoch Nawahine	Sr
RB	38	Logan Payne	Fr
RB	12	Preston Rex	So
TE	86	Cole Clement	Fr
TE	87	Ethan Erickson	Sr
TE	88	Tucker Kelleher	Fr
TE	82	Noah Moeaki	Fr
TE	45	Keayen Nead	Jr
TE	80	Jacob Nye	Fr
TE	85	Anthony Olsen	Jr
TE	20	Carsen Ryan	Sr
TE	24	Ethan Wood	So
TE	32	Will Zundel	Fr
WR	19	Tiger Bachmeier	Jr
WR	33	Jared Esplin	Fr
WR	7	Reggie Frischknecht	So
WR	5	Cody Hagen	So
WR	42	Quinn Hale	Fr
WR	39	Carter Hancok	Fr
WR	84	Kila Keone	Fr
WR	11	Parker Kingston	Jr
WR	89	Dominque McKenzie	Fr
WR	0	Tei Nacua	Fr
WR	13	Jojo Phillips	So
WR	29	Rowan Reay	Jr
WR	2	Chase Roberts	Sr
WR	22	Trey Roberts	Fr
WR	15	Lamason Waller III	Fr

Defense

Pos.	#	Name	Class
DB	1	Therrian Alexander	So
DB	25	Talan Alfrey	Sr
DB	4	Mory Bamba	Sr
DB	15	Tayvion Beasley	Jr
DB	39	Crew Clark	Fr
DB	26	Jordyn Criss	Fr
DB	3	Raider Damuni	Jr
DB	20	Cannon Devries	Fr
DB	31	Kevin Doe	So
DB	37	Joseph Douglas	Fr
DB	29	Jayden Dunlap	Sr
DB	0	Evan Johnson	Jr
DB	2	Jonathan Kabeya	So
DB	35	Jarinn Kalama	Fr
DB	27	Matthias Leach	Fr
DB	32	Marcus Mckenzie	So
DB	22	Tommy Prassas	So
DB	11	Faletau Satuala	So
DB	24	Payton VanSteenkiste	Fr
DB	28	Tanner Wall	Sr
DL	13	Tausili Akana	So
DL	59	Siosefa Brown	Fr
DL	90	Hunter Clegg	Fr
DL	99	Ulavai Fetuli	Fr
DL	97	Kinilau Fonohema	Fr
DL	93	Justin Kirkland	Sr
DL	93	Kelepi Latu-Finau	Fr
DL	7	Logan Lutui	Sr
DL	50	Maverick McManus	Fr
DL	53	Orion Maile-Kaufusi	Fr
DL	72	Kaufusi Pakofe	Sr
DL	45	Viliami Po'uha	So
DL	94	Anisi Purcell	Jr
DL	48	Bodie Schoonover	Jr
DL	57	Keanu Tanuvasa	Jr
DL	55	John Taumoepeau	Sr
DL	52	Vincent Tautua	Fr
DL	98	Sani Tuala	So
DL	46	Kendal Wall	Fr
LB	30	Max Alford (injured)	Jr
LB	47	Berkley Alfrey	Fr
LB	44	Ephraim Asiata	So
LB	33	Choe Bryant-Strother (injured)	Sr
LB	54	Siale Esera	So
LB	16	Isaiah Glasker	Jr
LB	21	Miles Hall	So
LB	18	Ace Kaufusi	So
LB	34	Maika Kaufusi	So
LB	17	Jack Kelly	Sr
LB	42	Tyler Payne	Fr
LB	5	Nusi Taumoepeau	Fr
LB	43	Naki Tuakoi	Fr
LB	23	Pierson Watson	Fr

Special teams

Pos.	#	Name	Class
DS	26	Garrison Grimes	Sr
DS	43	Ty Smith	Fr
P	31	Fuller Shurtz	So
P	35	Sam Van Der Haar	Jr
K	97	Matthias Dunn	Jr
K	44	Will Ferrin	Sr

Head coach

- Kalani Sitake (BYU)

Coordinators/assistant coaches

- Jay Hill (Utah)
  Associate Head Coach, Defensive Coordinator/Safeties
- Aaron Roderick (BYU)
  Offensive coordinator/Quarterbacks
- Kelly Poppinga (BYU)
  Special Teams Coordinator/Defensive Ends
- TJ Woods (Azusa Pacific)
  Offensive Line/Run Game Coordinator
- Fesi Sitake (Southern Utah)
  Passing Game Coordinator/Wide Receivers
- Kevin M. Gilbride (Hawaiʻi)
  Tight Ends
- Harvey Unga (BYU)
  Running Backs
- Justin Ena (BYU)
  Linebackers
- Jernaro Gilford (BYU)
  Cornerbacks
- Sione Po'uha (Utah)
  Defensive Tackles

Legend

- (C) Team captain
- (S) Suspended
- (I) Ineligible
- Injured
- Redshirt

Roster

=== Depth chart ===
Defense

FS
Tanner Wall
Raider Damuni
Matthias Leach

WLB	MLB	SLB
Jack Kelly	Siale Esera	Isaiah Glasker
Ace Kaufusi	Miles Hall	Nusi Taumeopeau
Ephraim Asiata	Pierson Watson	Maika Kaufusi

SS
Faletau Satuala
Talan Alfrey
Tommy Prassas

CB
Therrian Alexander III
Mory Bamba
Jonathan Kabeya

DE	DT	DT	DE
Bodie Schoonover	John Taumoepeau	Keanu Tanuvasa	Logan Lutui
Viliami Po'uha	Justin Kirkland	Anisi Purcell	Hunter Clegg
Orion Maile-Kaufusi	Ulavai Fetuli	Kaufusi Pafoke	Tausili AKana

CB
Evan Johnson
Tayvion Beasley
Jayden Dunlap

Offense

X-Receiver
Chase Roberts
Cody Hagen
Tiger Bachmeier

LT	LG	C	RG	RT
Isaiah Jatta	Weylin Lapuaho	Bruce Mitchell	Austin Leausa	Andrew Gentry
Kaden Chidester	Sonny Makasini	Trevor Pay	Kyle Sfarcioc	Trevin Ostler
Jake Griffin	Joe Brown	Sione Hingano	David Clifford	Ikinasio Tupou

TE
Carsen Ryan
Keayen Nead
Ethan Erickson

Z-Receiver
Parker Kingston
JoJo Phillips
Tei Nacua

QB
Bear Bachmeier
McCae Hillstead
Treyson Bourguet

Key reserves
DL Kinilau Fonohema
WR Reggie Frischknecht
DB Cannon Devries
WR Rowan Reay
TE Noah Moeaki
DB Jarinn Kalama
DL Kelepi Latu-Finau
DB Kevin Doe

RB
LJ Martin
Sione Moa
Preston Rex

FB
Enoch Nawahine
Jovesa Damuni
Logan Payne

Special teams
PK Will Ferrin
PK Matthias Dunn
P Sam Vander Haar
P Fuller Shurtz
KR Cody Hagan
KR Tiger Bachmeier
PR Parker Kingston
PR Tiger Bachmeier
LS Garrison Grimes
LS Ty Smith
H Sam Vander Haar
H Fuller Shurtz

== Rankings ==
Ranking movements Legend: ██ Increase in ranking ██ Decrease in ranking RV = Received votes т = Tied with team above or below
	Week																
Poll	Pre	1	2	3	4	5	6	7	8	9	10	11	12	13	14	15	Final
AP	RV	RV	RV	RV	25	23	18	15	11	10т	8	12	11	11	11	12	11
Coaches	23	25	25	RV	24	23	18	14	10	10	8	12т	11	11	11	13	12
CFP	Not released										7	12	11	11	11	12	Not released

== Awards ==
Twenty BYU players earned All-Big 12 awards for the season, including four First Team appointments (running back LJ Martin, center Bruce Mitchell, linebacker Jack Kelly, and safety Tanner Wall), and Martin being named Offensive Player of the Year and quarterback Bear Bachmeier being named Offensive Freshman of the Year. Additionally, head coach Kalani Sitake was named the conference's Coach of the Year.
