= 2025 Portland State Vikings football team =

American college football season

2025 Portland State Vikings football
- Conference: Big Sky Conference
- Record: 1–11 (1–7 Big Sky)
- Head coach: Bruce Barnum (11th season)
- Offensive coordinator: Matt Leunen (1st season)
- Offensive scheme: West Coast spread
- Defensive coordinator: Bryant Thomas (1st season)
- Base defense: 4–2–5
- Home stadium: Hillsboro Stadium

2025 Big Sky Conference football standings
	Conf.			Overall
Team	W		L	W		L
No. 1 Montana State $^	8	–	0	14	–	2
No. 3 Montana ^	7	–	1	13	–	2
No. 8 UC Davis ^	6	–	2	9	–	4
Sacramento State	5	–	3	7	–	5
Idaho State	5	–	3	6	–	6
Northern Arizona	4	–	4	7	–	5
Eastern Washington	4	–	4	5	–	7
Cal Poly	2	–	6	4	–	8
Idaho	2	–	6	4	–	8
Northern Colorado	2	–	6	4	–	8
Weber State	2	–	6	4	–	8
Portland State	1	–	7	1	–	11
$ – Conference champion; ^ – FCS playoff participant; Rankings from STATS Poll

The 2025 Portland State Vikings football team represented Portland State University as a member of the Big Sky Conference during the 2025 NCAA Division I FCS football season. The Vikings were led by eleventh-year head coach Bruce Barnum and played at the Hillsboro Stadium in Hillsboro, Oregon.

On November 22, following the Vikings' season finale, Barnum was fired as the program's head coach, finishing his tenure with an overall record of 39–75 through 11 seasons. On December 11, Central Washington head coach Chris Fisk was announced as the Vikings' new head coach.

== Big Sky prediction poll ==
The Big Sky Conference released its preseason prediction poll on July 17, 2025. The Vikings were predicted to finish 10th in the conference.

== Schedule ==
Date	Time	Opponent	Site	TV	Result	Attendance
August 23	1:30 p.m.	No. 10 Tarleton State*	Hillsboro Stadium; Hillsboro, OR	ESPN2	L 0–42	1,890
August 30	5:00 p.m.	at BYU*	LaVell Edwards Stadium; Provo, UT	ESPN+	L 0–69	64,494
September 6	4:00 p.m.	at No. 20 North Dakota*	Alerus Center; Grand Forks, ND	ESPN+	L 20–50	11,469
September 13	9:00 p.m.	at Hawaii*	Clarence T. C. Ching Athletics Complex; Honolulu, HI	Spectrum Sports	L 3–23	11,936
September 27	2:00 p.m.	No. 15 Northern Arizona	Hillsboro Stadium; Hillsboro, OR	ESPN+	L 17–31	1,542
October 4	4:00 p.m.	at Eastern Washington	Roos Field; Cheney, WA (The Dam Cup)	ESPN+	L 27–35	6,003
October 18	2:00 p.m.	Weber State	Hillsboro Stadium; Hillsboro, OR	ESPN+	L 27–43	1,489
October 25	1:00 p.m.	at Idaho	Kibbie Dome; Moscow, ID	ESPN+	L 6–45	7,040
November 1	2:00 p.m.	at Cal Poly	Alex G. Spanos Stadium; San Luis Obispo, CA	ESPN+	W 40–35	8,035
November 8	2:00 p.m.	Sacramento State	Hillsboro Stadium; Hillsboro, OR	ESPN+	L 24–52	1,284
November 15	2:00 p.m.	No. 2 Montana	Providence Park; Portland, OR	ESPN+	L 17–63	9,075
November 22	11:00 a.m.	at Northern Colorado	Nottingham Field; Greeley, CO	ESPN+	L 13–24	2,902
*Non-conference game; Rankings from STATS Poll released prior to the game; All times are in Pacific time

== Game summaries ==
=== No. 10 Tarleton State ===
No. 10 Tarleton State Texans (0–0) at Portland State Vikings (0–0) – Game summary

Quarter	1	2	3	4	Total
No. 10 Texans	7	7	14	14	42
Vikings	0	0	0	0	0

at Hillsboro Stadium • Hillsboro, Oregon

- Date: August 23
- Game time: 1:30 p.m. PDT
- Game weather: Sunny • Temperature: 97 °F (36 °C) • Wind: NE at 5 miles per hour (8.0 km/h)
- Game attendance: 1,890
- Referee: Spencer Mumford
- TV announcers (ESPN2): Jorge Sedano (play-by-play), Rodney McLeod (analyst), and Victoria Arlen (sideline reporter)
- Box score, Recap

Game information

First quarter

- TAR – Tre Page III 28-yard run (Corbin Poston kick), 7:25. Texans 7–0. Drive: 3 plays, 49 yards, 0:59.

Second quarter

- TAR – Tre Page III 89-yard run (Corbin Poston kick), 10:49. Texans 14–0. Drive: 1 play, 89 yards, 0:15.

Third quarter

- TAR – Dawson Hearne 14-yard pass from Victor Gabalis (Corbin Poston kick), 6:02. Texans 21–0. Drive: 6 plays, 88 yards, 2:57.
- TAR – Danny Joiner 4-yard pass from Victor Gabalis (Corbin Poston kick), 4:04. Texans 28–0. Drive: 4 plays, 29 yards, 1:50.

Fourth quarter

- TAR – Omar Emmons 37-yard interception return (Corbin Poston kick), 12:21. Texans 35–0.
- TAR – Caleb Lewis 8-yard run (Corbin Poston kick), 2:53. Texans 42–0. Drive: 12 plays, 75 yards, 6:51.

Statistics	TAR	PRST
First downs	22	17
Plays–yards	63–453	64–277
Rushes–yards	38–301	29–108
Passing yards	152	169
Passing: Comp–Att–Int	14–25–0	18–35–3
Turnovers	1	4
Time of possession	27:38	32:22

Team	Category	Player	Statistics
Tarleton State	Passing	Victor Gabalis	14/24, 152 yards, 2 TD
Tarleton State	Rushing	Tre Page III	15 carries, 170 yards, 2 TD
Tarleton State	Receiving	Cody Jackson	4 receptions, 96 yards
Portland State	Passing	Gabe Downing	10/17, 91 yards, 2 INT
Portland State	Rushing	Delon Thompson	17 carries, 55 yards
Portland State	Receiving	Branden Alvarez	6 receptions, 72 yards

=== at BYU (FBS) ===
Portland State Vikings (0–1) at BYU Cougars (FBS) (0–0) – Game summary

Quarter	1	2	3	4	Total
Vikings	0	0	0	0	0
Cougars (FBS)	14	35	6	14	69

at LaVell Edwards Stadium • Provo, Utah

- Date: August 30
- Game time: 5:00 p.m. PDT/6:00 p.m. MDT
- Game weather: Cloudy • Temperature: 82 °F (28 °C) • Wind: SE at 9 miles per hour (14 km/h)
- Game attendance: 64,494
- Referee: Tutashinda Salaam
- TV announcers (ESPN+): Mike Corey and Brad Hopkins
- Box score, Recap

Game information

First quarter

- BYU – 3:58 Jack Kelly 54 yard blocked field goal return, Will Ferrin kick
  BYU 7–0
- BYU – 0:00 Chase Roberts 4-yard reception from Bear Bachmeier, Will Ferrin kick
  BYU 14–0 Drive: 4 plays, 56 yards, 2:23

Second quarter

- BYU – 9:52 Noah Moeaki 5-yard reception from Bear Bachmeier, Will Ferrin kick
  BYU 21–0 Drive: 7 plays, 48 yards, 2:55
- BYU – 6:53 Cody Hagen 57 yard run, Will Ferrin kick
  BYU 28–0 Drive: 4 plays, 84 yards, 1:53
- BYU – 6:15 Bear Bachmeier 4 yard run, Will Ferrin kick
  BYU 35–0 Drive: 2 plays, 6 yards, 0:25
- BYU – 3:35 Carsen Ryan 22 yard reception from Bear Bachmeier, Will Ferrin kick
  BYU 42–0 Drive: 4 plays, 91 yards, 1:24
- BYU – 0:49 Bear Bachmeier 12 yard run, Will Ferrin kick
  BYU 49–0 Drive: 4 plays, 58 yards, 1:05

Third quarter

- BYU – 6:33 Will Ferrin 25 yard field goal
  BYU 52–0 Drive: 15 plays, 68 yards, 8:27
- BYU – 2:09 Will Ferrin 56 yard field goal
  BYU 55–0 Drive: 6 plays, 12 yards, 3:11

Fourth quarter

- BYU – 14:51 Dominique McKenzie 41 yard run, Will Ferrin kick
  BYU 62–0 Drive: 2 plays, 53 yards, 0:13
- BYU – 1:55 Charles Miska 5 yard run, Will Ferrin kick
  BYU 69–0 Drive: 15 plays, 79 yards, 10:21

Statistics	PRST	BYU
First downs	3	28
Plays–yards	44–51	66–606
Rushes–yards	24–(-5)	48–468
Passing yards	56	138
Passing: comp–att–int	10–20–0	12–18–0
Turnovers	1	1
Time of possession	25:38	34:22

Team	Category	Player	Statistics
Portland State	Passing	CJ Jordan	8/14, 58 yards
Portland State	Rushing	Jacques Badolato-Birdsell	12 carries, 28 yards
Portland State	Receiving	Kristian Ingman	1 reception, 20 yards
BYU	Passing	Bear Bachmeier	7/11, 97 yards, 3 TD
BYU	Rushing	LJ Martin	8 carries, 131 yards
BYU	Receiving	Carsen Ryan	2 receptions, 47 yards, TD

=== at No. 20 North Dakota ===
Portland State Vikings (0–2) at No. 20 North Dakota Fighting Hawks (0–1) – Game summary

Quarter	1	2	3	4	Total
Vikings	6	0	7	7	20
No. 20 Fighting Hawks	22	14	7	7	50

at Alerus Center • Grand Forks, North Dakota

- Date: September 6
- Game time: 4:00 p.m. PDT/6:00 p.m. CDT
- Game weather: None (played indoors)
- Game attendance: 11,469
- Referee: John Shay
- TV announcers (ESPN+): Brian Shawn (play-by-play) and Ryan Kasowski (analyst)
- Box score, Recap

Game information

First quarter

- (10:37) UND – Nathan Hromadka 5-yard pass from Jerry Kaminski, CJ Elrichs kick (Drive: 9 plays, 61 yards, 4:17; North Dakota 7–0)
- (8:43) UND – Jerry Kaminski 7-yard run, Simon Romfo rush (Drive: 4 plays, 17 yards, 1:49; North Dakota 15–0)
- (4:36) UND – Deng Deng 4-yard pass from Jerry Kaminski, CJ Elrichs kick (Drive: 6 plays, 61 yards, 3:05; North Dakota 22–0)
- (0:48) PRST – Jaylen Lynch 34-yard pass from John-Keawe Sagapolutele (Drive: 7 plays, 77 yards, 3:41; North Dakota 22–6)

Second quarter

- (11:29) UND – Nathan Hromadka 20-yard pass from Jerry Kaminski, CJ Elrichs kick (Drive: 5 plays, 60 yards, 2:03; North Dakota 29–6)
- (4:27) UND – Gaven Ziebarth 5-yard run, CJ Elrichs kick (Drive: 3 plays, 25 yards, 1:12; North Dakota 36–6)

Third quarter

- (9:07) UND – Tray Kuntz 4-yard pass from Jerry Kaminski, CJ Elrichs kick (Drive: 6 plays, 44 yards, 2:48; North Dakota 43–6)
- (2:25) PRST – Delon Thompson 3-yard run, Mathias Uribe kick (Drive: 13 plays, 80 yards, 6:35; North Dakota 43–13)

Fourth quarter

- (10:55) UND – Javance Tupou'ata-Johnson 2-yard run, CJ Elrichs kick (Drive: 12 plays, 90 yards, 6:26; North Dakota 50–13)
- (4:30) PRST – Jaxton Helmstetler 70-yard fumble recovery, Mathias Uribe kick (North Dakota 50–20)

Statistics	PRST	UND
First downs	12	27
Plays–yards	49–228	74–446
Rushes–yards	31–82	51–275
Passing yards	146	171
Passing: Comp–Att–Int	11–18–2	15–23–0
Turnovers	3	1
Time of possession	24:26	35:34

Team	Category	Player	Statistics
Portland State	Passing	John-Keawe Sagapolutele	11/17, 146 yards, TD, 2 INT
Portland State	Rushing	Terence Loville	4 carries, 30 yards
Portland State	Receiving	Jaylen Lynch	2 receptions, 41 yards, TD
North Dakota	Passing	Jerry Kaminski	14/21, 164 yards, 4 TD
North Dakota	Rushing	Jerry Kaminski	8 carries, 70 yards, TD
North Dakota	Receiving	Nathan Hromadka	3 receptions, 41 yards, 2 TD

=== at Hawaii (FBS) ===
Portland State Vikings (0–3) at Hawaii Rainbow Warriors (FBS) (2–1) – Game summary

Quarter	1	2	3	4	Total
Vikings	0	0	3	0	3
Rainbow Warriors (FBS)	0	14	3	6	23

at Clarence T.C. Ching Athletics Complex • Honolulu, HI

- Date: September 13, 2025
- Game time: 6:00 p.m. HST
- Game weather: Sunny and breezy, 81 °F (27 °C)
- Game attendance: 11,956
- TV announcers (Spectrum Sports): Kanoa Leahey (play-by-play) and Rich Miano (analyst)
- Box score, Recap

Game information

First quarter

No scoring

Second quarter

- (13:09) HAW – Cam Barfield 16-yard pass from Luke Weaver, Kansei Matsuzawa kick (Drive: 10 plays, 73 yards, 4:00; Hawaii 7–0)
- (9:39) HAW – Cam Barfield 31-yard pass from Luke Weaver, Kansei Matsuzawa kick (Drive: 7 plays, 53 yards, 2:35; Hawaii 14–0)

Third quarter

- (9:30) HAW – Kansei Matsuzawa 44-yard field goal (Drive: 12 plays, 61 yards, 5:25; Hawaii 17–0)
- (3:45) PSU – Mathias Uribe 25-yard field goal (Drive: 5 plays, 33 yards, 1:39; Hawaii 17–3)

Fourth quarter

- (8:12) HAW – Kansei Matsuzawa 47-yard field goal (Drive: 14 plays, 51 yards, 6:37; Hawaii 20–3)
- (0:58) HAW – Kansei Matsuzawa 34-yard field goal (Drive: 7 plays, 13 yards, 2:46; Hawaii 23–3)

Statistics	PRST	HAW
First downs	16	18
Plays–yards	58–230	74–357
Rushes–yards	23–41	29–107
Passing yards	189	250
Passing: Comp–Att–Int	23-35-1	27-45-0
Turnovers	1	0
Time of possession	25:53	34:07

Team	Category	Player	Statistics
Portland State	Passing	John-Keawe Sagapolutele	23/35, 189 yards, INT
Portland State	Rushing	Eddy Schultz	3 carries, 23 yards
Portland State	Receiving	Zachary Dodson-Greene	9 receptions, 78 yards
Hawaii	Passing	Luke Weaver	26/42, 240 yards, 2 TD
Hawaii	Rushing	Landon Sims	9 carries, 41 yards
Hawaii	Receiving	Cam Barfield	4 receptions, 50 yards, 2 TD

=== No. 15 Northern Arizona ===
No. 15 Northern Arizona Lumberjacks (3–1) at Portland State Vikings (0–4) – Game summary

Quarter	1	2	3	4	Total
No. 15 Lumberjacks	14	10	0	7	31
Vikings	7	3	7	0	17

at Hillsboro Stadium • Hillsboro, OR

- Date: September 27
- Game time: 2:00 p.m. PDT
- Game weather: Cloudy • Temperature: 72 °F (22 °C) • Wind: E at 3 miles per hour (4.8 km/h)
- Game attendance: 1,542
- Referee: Robert Quello
- TV announcers (ESPN+): Matt Richert (play-by-play) and Scott Hermo (analyst)

Game information

First quarter

- PRST – Eddy Schultz 10-yard pass from John-Keawe Sagapolutele (Mathias Uribe kick), 11:30. Vikings 7–0. Drive: 7 plays, 65 yards, 3:30.
- NAU – Seth Cromwell 1-yard run (Samuel Hunsaker kick), 7:29. Tied 7–7. Drive: 8 plays, 70 yards, 3:54.
- NAU – Kolbe Katsis 15-yard pass from Ty Pennington (Samuel Hunsaker kick), 1:12. Lumberjacks 14–7. Drive: 8 plays, 87 yards, 4:11.

Second quarter

- NAU – Samuel Hunsaker 28-yard field goal, 8:32. Lumberjacks 17–7. Drive: 9 plays, 85 yards, 3:47.
- PRST – Mathias Uribe 31-yard field goal, 3:22. Lumberjacks 17–10. Drive: 11 plays, 51 yards, 5:10.
- NAU – Quran Gossett 3-yard run (Samuel Hunsaker kick), 0:10. Lumberjacks 24–10. Drive: 10 plays, 83 yards, 3:06.

Third quarter

- PRST – Jordan Herron 57-yard punt return (Mathias Uribe kick), 7:17. Lumberjacks 24–17.

Fourth quarter

- NAU – Quran Gossett 29-yard run (Samuel Hunsaker kick), 12:54. Lumberjacks 31–17. Drive: 5 plays, 90 yards, 2:51.

Statistics	NAU	PRST
First downs	25	20
Plays–yards	65–515	63–325
Rushes–yards	41–253	26–123
Passing yards	262	202
Passing: Comp–Att–Int	15–24–0	19–37–0
Turnovers	0	0
Time of possession	30:26	29:34

Team	Category	Player	Statistics
Northern Arizona	Passing	Ty Pennington	15/24, 262 yards, TD
Northern Arizona	Rushing	Quran Gossett	16 carries, 112 yards, 2 TD
Northern Arizona	Receiving	Kolbe Katsis	4 receptions, 56 yards, TD
Portland State	Passing	John-Keawe Sagapolutele	18/36, 202 yards, TD
Portland State	Rushing	Delon Thompson	17 carries, 88 yards
Portland State	Receiving	Kristian Ingman	3 receptions, 73 yards

=== at Eastern Washington (The Dam Cup) ===
Portland State Vikings (0–5) at Eastern Washington Eagles (1–4) – Game summary

Quarter	1	2	3	4	Total
Vikings	7	10	3	7	27
Eagles	14	7	14	0	35

at Roos Field • Cheney, WA

- Date: October 4
- Game time: 4:00 p.m. PDT
- Game weather: Sunny • Temperature: 64 °F (18 °C) • Wind:7 miles per hour (11 km/h)
- Game attendance: 6,003
- Referee: Kelly Holman
- TV: ESPN+

Game information

First quarter

- EWU – Nate Bell 45-yard run (Soren McKee kick), 10:47. Eagles 7–0. Drive: 5 plays, 88 yards, 1:55.
- PRST – Delon Thompson 2-yard run (Fyodor Henrichs-Tarasenkov kick), 4:01. Tied 7–7. Drive: 12 plays, 75 yards, 6:46.
- EWU – Kevin Allen III 8-yard run (Soren McKee kick), 0:59. Eagles 14–7. Drive: 8 plays, 78 yards, 2:55.

Second quarter

- EWU – Marceese Yetts 37-yard run (Soren McKee kick), 4:40. Eagles 21–7. Drive: 9 plays, 74 yards, 3:14.
- PRST – Delon Thompson 1-yard run (Mathias Uribe kick), 1:00. Eagles 21–14. Drive: 9 plays, 75 yards, 3:40.
- PRST – Mathias Uribe 38-yard field goal, 0:24. Eagles 21–17. Drive: 4 plays, 0 yards, 0:16.

Third quarter

- PRST – Mathias Uribe 25-yard field goal, 7:45. Eagles 21–20. Drive: 10 plays, 50 yards, 6:04.
- EWU – Landon Cooper 9-yard pass from Nate Bell (Soren McKee kick), 5:03. Eagles 28–20. Drive: 6 plays, 62 yards, 2:36.
- EWU – Kevin Allen III 50-yard run (Soren McKee kick), 3:10. Eagles 35–20. Drive: 3 plays, 70 yards, 1:05.

Fourth quarter

- PRST – Terence Loville 24-yard pass from John-Keawe Sagapolutele (Mathias Uribe kick), 9:56. Eagles 35–27. Drive: 3 plays, 43 yards, 1:15.

Statistics	PRST	EWU
First downs	24	19
Plays–yards	64–469	60–461
Rushes–yards	37–130	41–333
Passing yards	339	128
Passing: Comp–Att–Int	29–47–1	11–19–1
Turnovers	1	3
Time of possession	35:20	24:40

Team	Category	Player	Statistics
Portland State	Passing	John-Keawe Sagapolutele	28/45, 302 yards, TD, INT
Portland State	Rushing	Delon Thompson	25 carries, 60 yards, 2 TD
Portland State	Receiving	Terence Loville	7 receptions, 114 yards, TD
Eastern Washington	Passing	Nate Bell	10/18, 95 yards, TD, INT
Eastern Washington	Rushing	Nate Bell	17 carries, 175 yards, TD
Eastern Washington	Receiving	Marceese Yetts	2 receptions, 43 yards

=== Weber State ===
Weber State Wildcats (2–4) at Portland State Vikings (0–6) – Game summary

Quarter	1	2	3	4	Total
Wildcats	9	3	17	14	43
Vikings	3	3	0	21	27

at Hillsboro Stadium • Hillsboro, OR

- Date: October 18
- Game time: 2:05 p.m. PDT
- Game weather: Cloudy • Temperature: 60 °F (16 °C) • Wind: E at 2 miles per hour (3.2 km/h)
- Game attendance: 1,489
- Referee: Gregg Wilson
- TV: ESPN+

Game information

First quarter

- WEB – Sloan Calder 48-yard field goal, 12:01. Wildcats 3–0. Drive: 5 plays, 49 yards, 1:15.
- WEB – Ishaan Daniels 20-yard interception return (Sloan Calder kick BLOCKED), 11:16. Wildcats 9–0.
- PRST – Mathias Uribe 27-yard field goal, 4:33. Wildcats 9–3. Drive: 13 plays, 63 yards, 6:37.

Second quarter

- PRST – Mathias Uribe 36-yard field goal, 11:02. Wildcats 9–6. Drive: 8 plays, 40 yards, 3:11.
- WEB – Sloan Calder 34-yard field goal, 0:06. Wildcats 12–6. Drive: 7 plays, 36 yards, 1:11.

Third quarter

- WEB – Chauncey Sylvester 1-yard run (Sloan Calder kick), 10:06. Wildcats 19–6. Drive: 9 plays, 78 yards, 4:47.
- WEB – Sloan Calder 44-yard field goal, 6:08. Wildcats 22–6. Drive: 7 plays, 14 yards, 3:42.
- WEB – Zach Hrbacek 5-yard run (Sloan Calder kick), 4:15. Wildcats 29–6. Drive: 3 plays, 16 yards, 1:17.

Fourth quarter

- PRST – Tyrese Smith 15-yard run (Mathias Uribe kick), 14:00. Wildcats 29–13. Drive: 11 plays, 75 yards, 5:15.
- WEB – Will Way 1-yard run (Sloan Calder kick), 8:52. Wildcats 36–13. Drive: 1 play, 1 yard, 0:10.
- WEB – Spencer Ferguson 24-yard run (Sloan Calder kick), 5:00. Wildcats 43–13. Drive: 4 plays, 34 yards, 2:17.
- PRST – Tyrese Smith 4-yard run (Mathias Uribe kick), 2:53. Wildcats 43–20. Drive: 6 plays, 75 yards, 2:07.
- PRST – Zachary Dodson-Greene 14-yard pass from Tyrese Smith (Mathias Uribe kick), 0:33. Wildcats 43–27. Drive: 5 plays, 71 yards, 1:09.

Statistics	WEB	PRST
First downs	18	17
Plays–yards	66–370	70–378
Rushes–yards	41–220	33–65
Passing yards	150	313
Passing: Comp–Att–Int	15–25–1	21–37–4
Turnovers	1	5
Time of possession	30:46	29:14

Team	Category	Player	Statistics
Weber State	Passing	Dijon Jennings	13/19, 123 yards, INT
Weber State	Rushing	Chauncey Sylvester	19 carries, 135 yards, TD
Weber State	Receiving	Marvin Session	3 receptions, 58 yards
Portland State	Passing	Tyrese Smith	9/14, 170 yards, TD, INT
Portland State	Rushing	Tyrese Smith	7 carries, 38 yards, 2 TD
Portland State	Receiving	Andre Miller	4 receptions, 82 yards

=== at Idaho ===
Portland State Vikings (0–7) at Idaho Vandals (2–5) – Game summary

Quarter	1	2	3	4	Total
Vikings	3	3	0	0	6
Vandals	7	21	14	3	45

at Kibbie Dome • Moscow, ID

- Date: October 25
- Game time: 1:00 p.m. PDT
- Game weather: Indoor • Temperature: 50 °F (10 °C)
- Game attendance: 7,040
- Referee: Jeff Rink
- TV announcers (ESPN+): Austin Getz (play-by-play) and Adam Shackleford (analyst)

Game information

First quarter

- PRST - Mathias Uribe 27-yard field goal, 3:55. Vikings 3-0. Drive: 15 plays, 60 yards, 7:22.
- IDHO - Elisha Cummings 64-yard pass from Joshua Wood (Owen Adams kick), 2:49. Vandals 7-3. Drive: 2 plays, 73 yards, 0:59.

Second quarter

- IDHO - Noah West-Baranco 48-yard pass from Joshua Wood (Owen Adams kick), 12:07. Vandals 14-3. Drive: 2 plays, 59 yards, 0:49.
- PRST - Mathias Uribe 40-yard field goal, 8:38. Vandals 14-6. Drive: 6 plays, 52 yards, 3:29.
- IDHO - Marquawn McCraney 24-yard pass from Joshua Wood (Owen Adams kick), 4:57. Vandals 21-6. Drive: 8 plays, 69 yards, 3:35.
- IDHO - Emmerson Cortez-Menjivar 6-yard pass from Joshua Wood (Owen Adams kick), 0:17. Vandals 28-6. Drive: 9 plays, 77 yards, 2:04.

Third quarter

- IDHO - Jake Cox 42-yard pass from Rocco Koch (Owen Adams kick), 12:47. Vandals 35-6. Drive: 4 plays, 75 yards, 2:13.
- IDHO - Elisha Cummings 13-yard run (Owen Adams kick), 6:51. Vandals 42-6. Drive: 8 plays, 44 yards, 4:55.

Fourth quarter

- IDHO - Owen Adams 44-yard field goal, 11:38. Vandals 45-6. Drive: 5 plays, 10 yards, 3:22.

Statistics	PRST	IDHO
First downs	16	22
Plays–yards	62–317	55–464
Rushes–yards	35–135	28–163
Passing yards	182	301
Passing: Comp–Att–Int	14-27-2	18-27-0
Turnovers	2	0
Time of possession	31:48	28:12

Team	Category	Player	Statistics
Portland State	Passing	Tyrese Smith	7/13, 141 yards, INT
Portland State	Rushing	Tyrese Smith	9 carries, 42 yards
Portland State	Receiving	Terence Loville	2 receptions, 59 yards
Idaho	Passing	Joshua Wood	15/22, 259 yards, 4 TD
Idaho	Rushing	Elisha Cummings	8 carries, 65 yards, TD
Idaho	Receiving	Elisha Cummings	4 receptions, 100 yards, TD

=== at Cal Poly ===
Portland State Vikings (0–8) at Cal Poly Mustangs (3–5) – Game summary

Quarter	1	2	3	4	Total
Vikings	14	10	10	6	40
Mustangs	7	7	14	7	35

at Alex G. Spanos Stadium • San Luis Obispo, CA

- Date: November 1
- Game time: 2:00 PM PDT
- Game weather: Sunny • Temperature: 71 °F (22 °C) • Wind: NW at 10 miles per hour (16 km/h)
- Game attendance: 8,035
- Referee: Jim Crowley
- TV: ESPN+

Game information

First quarter

- PRST – Delon Thompson 30-yard pass from John-Keawe Sagapolutele (Mathias Uribe kick), 7:48. Vikings 7–0. Drive: 1 play, 20 yards, 0:24.
- CP – Ty Dieffenbach 16-yard run (Noah Serna kick), 4:06. Tied 7–7. Drive: 7 plays, 49 yards, 3:44.
- PRST – Delon Thompson 2-yard run (Mathias Uribe kick), 0:39. Vikings 14–7. Drive: 7 plays, 65 yards, 3:27.

Second quarter

- PRST – Delon Thompson 1-yard run (Mathias Uribe kick), 11:26. Vikings 21–7. Drive: 5 plays, 52 yards, 2:51.
- CP – Kendric Sanders 4-yard run (Gianluca Dimauro kick), 6:04. Vikings 21–14. Drive: 9 plays, 75 yards, 5:18.
- PRST – Mathias Uribe 33-yard field goal, 3:53. Vikings 24–14. Drive: 6 plays, 56 yards, 2:05.

Third quarter

- PRST – Delon Thompson 77-yard run (Mathias Uribe kick), 13:31. Vikings 31–14. Drive: 1 play, 77 yards, 0:13.
- CP – Misa Paiau 1-yard run (Gianluca Dimauro kick), 9:11. Vikings 31–21. Drive: 8 plays, 76 yards, 4:17.
- CP – Misa Paiau 1-yard pass from Ty Dieffenbach (Gianluca Dimauro kick), 4:58. Vikings 31–28. Drive: 4 plays, 59 yards, 1:23.
- PRST – Mathias Uribe 37-yard field goal, 0:52. Vikings 34–28. Drive: 8 plays, 45 yards, 4:01.

Fourth quarter

- PRST – Tyrese Smith 6-yard run (pass failed), 13:16. Vikings 40–28. Drive: 5 plays, 15 yards, 1:46.
- CP – Ty Dieffenbach 1-yard run (Noah Serna kick), 0:55. Vikings 40–35. Drive: 3 plays, 65 yards, 0:38.

Statistics	PRST	CP
First downs	22	21
Plays–yards	73–502	61–450
Rushes–yards	43–242	36–243
Passing yards	260	207
Passing: Comp–Att–Int	18–30–2	14–25–2
Turnovers	2	3
Time of possession	32:59	27:01

Team	Category	Player	Statistics
Portland State	Passing	John-Keawe Sagapolutele	17/26, 252 yards, TD, INT
Portland State	Rushing	Delon Thompson	26 carries, 184 yards, 3 TD
Portland State	Receiving	Terence Loville	4 receptions, 86 yards
Cal Poly	Passing	Ty Dieffenbach	14/23, 207 yards, TD, INT
Cal Poly	Rushing	Kendric Sanders	14 carries, 121 yards, TD
Cal Poly	Receiving	Michael Briscoe	4 receptions, 81 yards

=== Sacramento State ===
Sacramento State Hornets (5–4) at Portland State Vikings (1–8) – Game summary

Quarter	1	2	3	4	Total
Hornets	14	7	14	17	52
Vikings	0	14	0	10	24

at Hillsboro Stadium • Hillsboro, OR

- Date: November 8
- Game time: 2:00 PM PST
- Game weather: Cloudy • Temperature: 57 °F (14 °C) • Wind: E at 2 miles per hour (3.2 km/h)
- Game attendance: 1,284
- Referee: Mike Bezner
- TV announcers (ESPN+): Matt Richert (play-by-play) and Scott Hermo (analyst)

Game information

First quarter

- SAC – Damian Henderson II 25-yard run (Grant Meadors kick), 8:57. Hornets 7–0. Drive: 12 plays, 83 yards, 6:03.
- SAC – Ernest Campbell 22-yard pass from Cardell Williams (Grant Meadors kick), 0:05. Hornets 14–0. Drive: 6 plays, 35 yards, 3:26.

Second quarter

- PRST – Delon Thompson 2-yard run (Mathias Uribe kick), 13:53. Hornets 14–7. Drive: 4 plays, 51 yards, 1:07.
- SAC – Ernest Campbell 65-yard pass from Cardell Williams (Grant Meadors kick), 13:36. Hornets 21–7. Drive: 1 play, 65 yards, 0:11.
- PRST – Charlie White 15-yard pass from Tyrese Smith (Mathias Uribe kick), 0:15. Hornets 21–14. Drive: 11 plays, 54 yards, 3:00.

Third quarter

- SAC – JaQuail Smith 6-yard run (Grant Meadors kick), 11:10. Hornets 28–14. Drive: 3 plays, 95 yards, 1:16.
- SAC – Rodney Hammond Jr. 41-yard run (Grant Meadors kick), 4:01. Hornets 35–14. Drive: 4 plays, 45 yards, 1:22.

Fourth quarter

- PRST – Tyrese Smith 1-yard run (Mathias Uribe kick), 13:17. Hornets 35–21. Drive: 11 plays, 75 yards, 5:44.
- SAC – Grant Meadors 35-yard field goal, 9:30. Hornets 38–21. Drive: 7 plays, 37 yards, 3:38.
- PRST – Mathias Uribe 31-yard field goal, 7:14. Hornets 38–24. Drive: 6 plays, 53 yards, 2:08.
- SAC – Rodney Hammond Jr. 19-yard run (Grant Meadors kick), 6:22. Hornets 45–24. Drive: 2 plays, 69 yards, 0:46.
- SAC – Sam Adams II 2-yard run (Grant Meadors kick), 3:35. Hornets 52–24. Drive: 2 plays, 14 yards, 0:37.

Statistics	SAC	PRST
First downs	18	17
Plays–yards	58–483	69–319
Rushes–yards	47–295	45–142
Passing yards	188	177
Passing: Comp–Att–Int	8–11–0	13–24–2
Turnovers	1	3
Time of possession	28:41	31:19

Team	Category	Player	Statistics
Sacramento State	Passing	Cardell Williams	8/11, 188 yards, 2 TD
Sacramento State	Rushing	Rodney Hammond Jr.	17 carries, 191 yards, 2 TD
Sacramento State	Receiving	Ernest Campbell	4 receptions, 103 yards, 2 TD
Portland State	Passing	Tyrese Smith	8/11, 105 yards, TD
Portland State	Rushing	Delon Thompson	22 carries, 80 yards, TD
Portland State	Receiving	Terence Loville	5 receptions, 106 yards

=== No. 2 Montana ===
No. 2 Montana Grizzlies (10–0) at Portland State Vikings (1–9) – Game summary

Quarter	1	2	3	4	Total
No. 2 Grizzlies	14	7	21	21	63
Vikings	7	3	0	7	17

at Hillsboro Stadium • Portland, OR

- Date: November 15
- Game time: 2:00 p.m. PDT
- Game attendance: 9,075
- Referee: Jeff Rink
- TV: ESPN+

Game information

First quarter

- PRST – Tyrese Smith 7-yard run (Mathias Uribe kick), 14:20. Vikings 7–0. Drive: 2 plays, 30 yards, 0:37.
- MONT – Eli Gillman 4-yard run (Ty Morrison kick), 6:33. Tied 7–7. Drive: 5 plays, 34 yards, 1:51.
- MONT – Eli Gillman 60-yard run (Ty Morrison kick), 0:00. Grizzlies 14–7. Drive: 5 plays, 85 yards, 2:03.

Second quarter

- MONT – Keali'i Ah Yat 15-yard run (Ty Morrison kick), 2:22. Grizzlies 21–7. Drive: 2 plays, 13 yards, 0:29.
- PRST – Mathias Uribe 33-yard field goal, 0:32. Grizzlies 21–10. Drive: 11 plays, 61 yards, 1:50.

Third quarter

- MONT – Brooks Davis 4-yard pass from Keali'i Ah Yat (Ty Morrison kick), 13:31. Grizzlies 28–10. Drive: 3 plays, 2 yards, 0:42.
- MONT – Josh Gale 27-yard pass from Keali'i Ah Yat (Ty Morrison kick), 12:03. Grizzlies 35–10. Drive: 2 plays, 22 yards, 0:37.
- MONT – Stevie Rocker Jr. 27-yard pass from Keali'i Ah Yat (Ty Morrison kick), 4:57. Grizzlies 42–10. Drive: 5 plays, 70 yards, 2:07.

Fourth quarter

- MONT – Malae Fonoti 1-yard run (Jo Silver kick), 11:21. Grizzlies 49–10. Drive: 15 plays, 60 yards, 7:05.
- MONT – Korbin Hendrix 25-yard pass from Jake Jensen (Jo Silver kick), 9:54. Grizzlies 56–10. Drive: 3 plays, 15 yards, 1:21.
- PRST – Tyrese Smith 75-yard run (Mathias Uribe kick), 9:41. Grizzlies 56–17. Drive: 1 play, 75 yards, 0:13.
- MONT – Hashim Jones 30-yard run (Jo Silver kick), 3:33. Grizzlies 63–17. Drive: 11 plays, 76 yards, 5:59.

Statistics	MONT	PRST
First downs	24	15
Plays–yards	73–455	47–361
Rushes–yards	44–208	30–143
Passing yards	247	218
Passing: Comp–Att–Int	20–29–0	17–34–5
Turnovers	2	5
Time of possession	31:36	28:24

Team	Category	Player	Statistics
Montana	Passing	Keali'i Ah Yat	14/21, 184 yards, 3 TD
Montana	Rushing	Eli Gillman	10 carries, 81 yards, 2 TD
Montana	Receiving	Drew Deck	3 receptions, 63 yards
Portland State	Passing	John-Keawe Sagapolutele	12/24, 155 yards, 3 INT
Portland State	Rushing	Tyrese Smith	11 carries, 101 yards, 2 TD
Portland State	Receiving	Terence Loville	5 receptions, 70 yards

=== at Northern Colorado ===
Portland State Vikings (1–10) at Northern Colorado Bears (3–8) – Game summary

Quarter	1	2	3	4	Total
Vikings	7	0	3	3	13
Bears	0	14	7	3	24

at Nottingham Field • Greeley, CO

- Date: November 22
- Game time: 11:00 a.m. PST
- Game weather: Sunny • Temperature: 50 °F (10 °C)
- Game attendance: 2,902
- Referee: Jim Crowley
- TV: ESPN+

Game information

First quarter

- PRST – Cru Newman 3-yard run (Mathias Uribe kick), 8:55. Vikings 7–0. Drive: 8 plays, 52 yards, 4:07.

Second quarter

- UNCO – Justin Guin 44-yard run (Jacob Willig kick), 11:30. Tied 7–7. Drive: 2 plays, 45 yards, 0:43.
- UNCO – Brandon Johnson 1-yard run (Jacob Willig kick), 0:43. Bears 14–7. Drive: 5 plays, 52 yards, 1:08.

Third quarter

- PRST – Mathias Uribe 44-yard field goal, 11:27. Bears 14–10. Drive: 9 plays, 49 yards, 3:33.
- UNCO – Mathias Price 3-yard run (Jacob Willig kick), 8:38. Bears 21–10. Drive: 7 plays, 75 yards, 2:49.

Fourth quarter

- PRST – Mathias Uribe 36-yard field goal, 3:43. Bears 21–13. Drive: 10 plays, 49 yards, 3:40.
- UNCO – Jacob Willig 22-yard field goal, 0:38. Bears 24–13. Drive: 9 plays, 70 yards, 3:05.

Statistics	PRST	UNCO
First downs	23	11
Plays–yards	75–326	49–309
Rushes–yards	44–163	32–215
Passing yards	163	94
Passing: Comp–Att–Int	20–31–1	12–17–0
Turnovers	1	0
Time of possession	36:59	23:01

Team	Category	Player	Statistics
Portland State	Passing	John-Keawe Sagapolutele	10/15, 69 yards, INT
Portland State	Rushing	Delon Thompson	14 carries, 60 yards
Portland State	Receiving	Terence Loville	5 receptions, 48 yards
Northern Colorado	Passing	Eric Gibson Jr.	12/17, 94 yards
Northern Colorado	Rushing	Justin Guin	9 carries, 115 yards, TD
Northern Colorado	Receiving	Carver Cheeks	4 receptions, 43 yards
