= 2025 Big 12 Championship Game =

2025 Edward Jones Big 12 Championship Game
BYU Cougars	Texas Tech Red Raiders
(11–1)	(11–1)
7	34
Head coach: Kalani Sitake	Head coach: Joey McGuire
AP / Coaches / CFP; 11 / 11 / 11	AP / Coaches / CFP; 5 / 6 / 4
	1	2	3	4	Total
BYU	7	0	0	0	7
Texas Tech	0	13	11	10	34
- Date: December 6, 2025
- Season: 2025
- Stadium: AT&T Stadium
- Location: Arlington, Texas
- Favorite: Texas Tech by 12.5
- National anthem: Lanie Gardner
- Referee: Kevin Mar
- Halftime show: Jon Pardi
- Attendance: 85,519

United States TV coverage
- Network: ABC; ESPN+ ESPN Radio
- Announcers: ABC/ESPN+: Joe Tessitore (play-by-play), Jesse Palmer (analyst), Katie George, and Kris Budden (sideline reporters); ESPN Radio: Mike Couzens (play-by-play), Max Starks (analyst), and Mike Peasley (sideline reporter)

International TV coverage
- Network: Canada: TSN2; Brazil: ESPN Brazil
- Announcers: ESPN Brazil: Matheus Pinheiro (play-by-play) and Eduardo Zolin (analyst)

2025 Big 12 Conference football standings
	Conf.			Overall
Team	W		L	W		L
No. 7 Texas Tech y$^	8	–	1	12	–	2
No. 11 BYU y	8	–	1	12	–	2
No. 14 Utah	7	–	2	11	–	2
No. 22 Houston	6	–	3	10	–	3
Arizona	6	–	3	9	–	4
Arizona State	6	–	3	8	–	5
No. 25 TCU	5	–	4	9	–	4
Iowa State	5	–	4	8	–	4
Cincinnati	5	–	4	7	–	6
Kansas State	5	–	4	6	–	6
Baylor	3	–	6	5	–	7
Kansas	3	–	6	5	–	7
UCF	2	–	7	5	–	7
West Virginia	2	–	7	4	–	8
Colorado	1	–	8	3	–	9
Oklahoma State	0	–	9	1	–	11
Championship: Texas Tech 34, BYU 7
^ – College Football Playoff participant; $ – Conference champion; y – Championship game participant; Rankings from AP Poll

The 2025 Big 12 Championship Game was a college football game played on December 6, 2025, at AT&T Stadium in Arlington, Texas. It was the 24th edition of the Big 12 Championship Game and determined the champion of the Big 12 Conference for the 2025 season. The game aired on ABC at 12:00 EST. The game featured the top two teams, BYU and Texas Tech, following the regular season and the winner earned an automatic bid in the 2025–26 College Football Playoff. For the second straight year, a first-time Big 12 winner would be awarded the conference trophy. On November 10, 2025, the Big 12 announced Edward Jones as the new title sponsor of the game. Texas Tech defeated BYU 34–7, earning an automatic bid in the 2025–26 College Football Playoff.

== Overview ==
=== Team selection ===
Due to the conference having have imbalanced schedules, the conference will continue to use tiebreaking scenarios created before the 2024−25 season.

==== Two-team tiebreaker ====
1. The tied teams will be compared based on their head-to-head record during the season.
2. The tied teams will be compared based on win percentage against all common conference opponents.
3. The tied teams will be compared based on win percentage against the next highest-placed common opponent in the standings (based on the record in all games played within the Conference) proceeding through the standings.
4. The tied teams will be compared based on combined win percentage in conference games of conference opponents.
5. The tied teams will be compared based on total number of wins in a 12-game season.
6. The representative will be chosen based on highest ranking by SportSource Analytics (team rating score metric) following the last weekend of regular-season games.
7. The representative will be chosen by a coin toss.

==== Multiple-team tiebreaker ====
1. The records of the three (or more) tied teams will be compared based on winning percentage in games among the tied teams:
A. If all teams involved in the tie did not play each other, but one team defeated all other teams involved in the tie, the team that defeated all other teams in the tie is removed from the tiebreaker, and the remaining teams revert to the beginning of the applicable tiebreaker process (i.e., two team or three or more team tie).
B. If all teams involved in the tie did not play each other and no team defeated all other teams involved in the tie, move to the next step in tiebreaker.
2. The records of the three (or more) tied teams will be compared based on winning percentage against all common conference opponents played by all other teams involved in the tie.
3. Record of the three (or more) tied teams against the next highest placed common opponent in the standings (based on the record in all games played within the conference), proceeding through the standings. When arriving at another group of tied teams while comparing records, use each team’s win percentage against the collective tied teams as a group (prior to that group’s own tie-breaking procedure) rather than the performance against individual tied teams.
4. Record of the three (or more) tied teams based on combined win percentage in conference games of conference opponents (i.e., strength of conference schedule)
5. Total number of wins in a 12-game season. The following conditions will apply to the calculation of the total number of wins: Only one win against a team from the NCAA Football Championship Subdivision or lower division will be counted annually. Any games that are exempted from counting against the annual maximum number of football contests per NCAA rules. (Current Bylaw 17.10.5.2.1) shall not be included.
6. Highest ranking by SportSource Analytics (team Rating Score metric) following the last weekend of regular-season games.
7. Coin toss

=== Texas Tech ===
Texas Tech sought their first ever Big 12 championship, their first conference championship since winning the Southwest Conference in 1994 and first solo championship since 1955. The Red Raiders, led by fourth-year head coach Joey McGuire, finished the regular season with an overall record of 11–1, going 8–1 in conference play. The team's lone loss came against Arizona State, 26–22.

=== BYU ===
BYU sought their first Big 12 championship and first conference championship since 2007 when the Cougars won the Mountain West title. BYU, led by tenth-year head coach Kalani Sitake, also finished the regular season with an overall record of 11–1, with a conference record of 8–1. The Cougars' lone loss came in Week 10 of the season against Texas Tech, 29–7.

== Game summary ==
=== Scoring summary ===
2025 Big 12 Championship Game
No. 11 BYU Cougars (11–1, 8–1) vs. No. 4 Texas Tech Red Raiders (11–1, 8–1)

Quarter	1	2	3	4	Total
No. 11 BYU	7	0	0	0	7
No. 4 Texas Tech	0	13	11	10	34

at AT&T Stadium • Arlington, Texas

- Date: Saturday, December 6, 2025
- Game time: 11:00 a.m. CST
- Game weather: Indoor (retractable roof closed)
- Game attendance: 85,519
- Referee: Kevin Mar
- TV announcers (ABC): Joe Tessitore (play-by-play), Jesse Palmer (analyst), Katie George, and Kris Budden (sideline reporters)

Game information
First quarter
- BYU – LJ Martin 10-yard run (Will Ferrin kick), 4:58. Cougars 7–0. Drive: 14 plays, 90 yards, 6:50.

Second quarter

- TTU – Stone Harrrington 23-yard field goal, 14:56. Cougars 7–3. Drive: 11 plays, 70 yards, 5:02.
- TTU – Coy Eakin 33-yard pass from Behren Morton (Stone Harrington kick), 10:42. Red Raiders 10–7. Drive: 7 plays, 61 yards, 2:34.
- TTU – Stone Harrington 40-yard field goal, 0:21. Red Raiders 13–7. Drive: 7 plays, 45 yards, 1:16.

Third quarter

- TTU – Cameron Dickey 11-yard run (Behren Morton pass to Terrance Carter Jr.), 3:21. Red Raiders 21–7. Drive: 1 play, 11 yards, 0:05.

Fourth quarter

- TTU – Stone Harrington 44-yard field goal, 12:49. Red Raiders 24–7. Drive: 4 plays, -2 yards, 2:00.
- TTU – Coy Eakin 28-yard pass from Behren Morton (Stone Harrington kick), 7:04. Red Raiders 31–7. Drive: 4 plays, 37 yards, 1:59.
- TTU – Stone Harrington 28-yard field goal, 4:39. Red Raiders 34–7. Drive: 5 plays, 28 yards, 2:14.

Statistics	BYU	TTU
First downs	14	19
Plays–yards	59–200	74–374
Rushes–yards	30–63	41–159
Passing yards	137	215
Passing: comp–att–int	17–29–2	20–33–0
Turnovers	4	0
Time of possession	28:06	31:54

Team	Category	Player	Statistics
BYU	Passing	Bear Bachmeier	16/27, 115 yards, 2 INT
BYU	Rushing	LJ Martin	19 rushes, 76 yards, TD
BYU	Receiving	Parker Kingston	4 receptions, 44 yards
Texas Tech	Passing	Behren Morton	20/33, 215 yards, 2 TD
Texas Tech	Rushing	J'Koby Williams	15 rushes, 80 yards
Texas Tech	Receiving	Reggie Virgil	8 receptions, 86 yards

== See also ==
- List of Big 12 Conference football champions
