= 2025 Pop-Tarts Bowl =

American college football game

- 36th Pop-Tarts Bowl
Georgia Tech Yellow Jackets	BYU Cougars
(9–3)	(11–2)
ACC	Big 12
21	25
Head coach: Brent Key	Head coach: Kalani Sitake
AP / Coaches / CFP; 24 / 22 / 22	AP / Coaches / CFP; 12 / 13 / 12
	1	2	3	4	Total
Georgia Tech	7	14	0	0	21
BYU	7	3	0	15	25
- Date: December 27, 2025
- Season: 2025
- Stadium: Camping World Stadium
- Location: Orlando, Florida
- MVP: Bear Bachmeier (QB, BYU)
- Favorite: BYU by 3.5
- Referee: Chris Coyte (Big Ten)
- Attendance: 34,126

United States TV coverage
- Network: ABC
- Announcers: Mark Jones (play-by-play), Roddy Jones (analyst), and Quint Kessenich (sideline)

The 2025 Pop-Tarts Bowl was a college football bowl game played on December 27, 2025, at Camping World Stadium in Orlando, Florida. The 36th annual Pop-Tarts Bowl (though only the third edition under that name) began at approximately 3:30 p.m. EST and aired on ABC. The Pop-Tarts Bowl was one of the 2025–26 bowl games concluding the 2025 FBS football season. The bowl game's title sponsor was Kellanova through their Pop-Tarts brand of toaster pastries. Bowl organizers promoted this edition of the bowl as “The People’s National Championship.”

BYU of the Big 12 Conference defeated Georgia Tech of the Atlantic Coast Conference (ACC) by a 25–21 score.

== Teams ==
Consistent with conference tie-ins, the game featured Georgia Tech of the Atlantic Coast Conference (ACC, inclusive of Notre Dame) and BYU from the Big 12 Conference. It was speculated that Notre Dame would have received an invitation to the 2025 Pop-Tarts Bowl, but the team withdrew from all bowl game consideration for the 2025–26 bowl season. Georgia Tech and BYU had previously met four times, with BYU holding a 3–1 series lead.

=== Georgia Tech Yellow Jackets ===
Georgia Tech opened their season with eight consecutive wins, and were ranked as high as seventh. They suffered three losses in their final four regular-season games and entered the Pop-Tarts Bowl with a 9–3 record.

=== BYU Cougars ===
BYU also opened their season with eight consecutive wins, also reaching number seven in the polls. They lost to Texas Tech on November 8, won their next three games, then lost again to Texas Tech in the Big 12 Championship Game. The Cougars entered the Pop-Tarts Bowl with an 11–2 record.

== Game summary ==
2025 Pop-Tarts Bowl

Quarter	1	2	3	4	Total
No. 22 Georgia Tech	7	14	0	0	21
No. 12 BYU	7	3	0	15	25

at Camping World Stadium • Orlando, Florida

- Date: Saturday, December 27, 2025
- Game time: 3:30 p.m. EST
- Game weather: Clear • Temperature: 76 °F (24 °C) • Wind: 7 mph (11 km/h) southeast
- Game attendance: 34,126
- Referee: Chris Coyte
- TV announcers (ABC): Mark Jones (play-by-play), Roddy Jones (analyst), and Quint Kessenich (sideline)
- Box score

Game information

First quarter

- (4:56) BYU – Chase Roberts 7-yard pass from Bear Bachmeier (Will Ferrin kick) (Drive: 5 plays, 62 yards, 2:49; BYU 7–0)
- (0:20) GT – Trelain Maddox 3-yard run (Aidan Birr kick) (Drive: 10 plays, 75 yards, 4:36; Tied 7–7)

Second quarter

- (9:49) BYU – Will Ferrin 22-yard field goal (Drive: 12 plays, 71 yards, 5:31; BYU 10–7)
- (5:28) GT – Eric Rivers 5-yard pass from Haynes King (Aidan Birr kick) (Drive: 10 plays, 76 yards, 4:14; GT 14–10)
- (5:15) GT – J. T. Byrne 6-yard pass from Haynes King (Aidan Birr kick) (Drive: 1 play, 6 yards, 0:04; GT 21–10)

Third quarter

No scoring plays

Fourth quarter

- (11:13) BYU – Enoch Nawahine 2-yard run (Bear Bachmeier run for two-point conversion) (Drive: 11 plays, 80 yards, 4:42; GT 21–18)
- (2:00) BYU – Jovesa Damuni 4-yard run (Will Ferrin kick) (Drive: 9 plays, 70 yards, 3:44; BYU 25–21)

=== Statistics ===
Statistics	GT	BYU
First downs	21	26
Plays–yards	68-401	63-425
Rushes–yards	28-131	24-100
Passing yards	270	325
Passing: comp–att–int	22–40–1	27–39–1
Turnovers		
Time of possession	28:49	31:11

Team	Category	Player	Statistics
Georgia Tech	Passing	Haynes King	22/40, 254 yards, 2 TD, 1 INT
Georgia Tech	Rushing	Malachi Hosley	11 carries, 63 yards
Georgia Tech	Receiving	Malik Rutherford	8 receptions, 105 yards
BYU	Passing	Bear Bachmeier	27/38, 325 yards, 1 TD, 1 INT
BYU	Rushing	Jovesa Damuni	7 carries, 48 yards, 1 TD
BYU	Receiving	Carsen Ryan	8 receptions, 120 yards

== See also ==
- 2025 Cure Bowl, contest at the same venue ten days earlier
- 2025 Citrus Bowl, contest at the same venue four days later
