= Roy High School (Utah) =

Location
- 2150 West 4800 South; Roy, Utah 84067; United States

Information
- School type: Public, Secondary
- Motto: Live Golden, Bleed Black
- Established: 1965
- School district: Weber School District
- Principal: Brenda I. Hart
- Teaching staff: 64.89 (on an FTE basis)
- Grades: 10-12
- Enrollment: 1,661(2024–2025)
- Student to teacher ratio: 25.60
- Colors: Black and gold
- Team name: Royals
- Newspaper: The Round Table
- Website: roy.wsd.net

Roy High School is a 5A secondary school founded in 1965 that serves the residents of Roy, Utah.

== History ==
Prior to the establishment of Hill Air Force Base in 1940, the city of Roy had only one school that housed students of all ages. In 1943, that schoolhouse reached capacity and high school students were bused across Ogden to the north end of Washington Boulevard, a procedure practiced until 1965 when Roy High School was built.

In 2008, Roy High launched a new website for viewing full length boys' basketball games.

In November 2018, the Utah High School Activities Association changed Roy High's sports classification to 6A, the highest in the state.

== Notable alumni ==
- Luann "L'Wren Scott" Bambrough - model; costume and fashion designer (Class of 1982)
- Sabra Johnson - winner of FOX TV's reality competition TV show So You Think You Can Dance in 2007 (Class of 2005)
- Parker Kingston - college football wide receiver for the BYU Cougars (Class of 2022)
- Jaxson Dart - National Football League quarterback for the New York Giants (transferred to Corner Canyon High School for senior year)
- Jim McMahon - former football player; two-time Super Bowl Champion (Class of 1977)
- Randal Quarles - Under Secretary of the Treasury for Domestic Finance 2005–2006, Current candidate for Federal Reserve Chairmanship (Class of 1975)
- Billy Schuffenhauer - two-time Olympic medalist and gold medalist in the 1992 Junior Olympics (Class of 1991)

== State championships ==
- Football 1981
- Boys' track 1991
- Girls' soccer 1997
- Softball 1998
- Boys' soccer 2003
- Drill 2007
- Softball 2009
- Softball 2011
- Softball 2012
- Marching Band 2018
