= L'Wren Scott =

American model and fashion designer (1964–2014)

- Photo by Andrew Crowley, for The Daily Telegraph
- Born: Laura Bambrough; April 28, 1964; Salt Lake City, Utah, U.S.
- Died: March 17, 2014 (aged 49); New York City, U.S.
- Occupations: Model, fashion designer, stylist
- Spouses: Andrew Ladsky (m. 1990; div. 1993); Anthony Brand (m. 1993; div. 1997)
- Partner: Mick Jagger (2001–2014)

Laura "Luann" Bambrough (April 28, 1964 – March 17, 2014), known professionally as L'Wren Scott, was an American model, fashion designer, and stylist.

Scott started her career as a model in Paris before moving to California and styling movie stars such as Madonna and Julia Roberts. In 2006, she launched the first of her fashion collections, characterised by sumptuous femininity combined with unconventional touches, aimed at establishing a well-defined silhouette. She issued regular tips on etiquette, known as "L'Wrenisms", and extended her range into shoes, handbags, glasses, makeup and perfume. In 2013, she collaborated with Banana Republic on a line of affordable ready-to-wear holiday items.

Scott's longest relationship was with Rolling Stones frontman Mick Jagger, whom she met in Paris around 2001 and dated until her death. In 2014, following a period of severe depression, Scott was found dead in her home, from a suicide by hanging.

== Early life and education ==
Scott was named Laura Bambrough by her Mormon adoptive parents, Ivan and Lula Bambrough, who raised her in Roy, Utah, with two siblings, Jan and Randall, also adoptees. Laura was soon nicknamed "Luann". Known for her tall frame, she had already reached 6 ft 0 in (1.83 m) in height by age 12, and eventually grew to 6 ft 3 in (1.91 m). Because of her height, she had to sew her own clothes. She learned clothing construction and fabric quality starting at age 12. She graduated from Roy High School in 1982.

== Career ==
L'Wren Scott's career moved from model, stylist, to fashion designer. There are two versions of how she got her start.

The first has her being spotted at age 16 by photographer Bruce Weber when he came to Utah on a photo shoot. He advised her to go to Paris. It is said that a year later she flew to Europe on a one-way ticket, after telling her parents she was going to New York.

According to the other version, Scott moved to Los Angeles one and a half years after graduating from high school, where she was spotted by a scout with agency ties in Paris and began calling herself "L'Wren".

Working with Paris-based agencies, Glamour, and Marilyn Gauthier, she went on to work for Thierry Mugler, Chanel, and Helmut Newton, and modeled for photographers such as Guy Bourdin, David Bailey, and Jean-Paul Goude. Her first commercial success was as the legs on a clock for Pretty Polly hosiery ads, with photographs by Bailey.

=== Stylist ===
Scott moved to California in the early 1990s and established herself as a stylist, initially in collaboration with photographer Herb Ritts, and later with Helmut Newton, Karl Lagerfeld and Mario Sorrenti. One of her early assignments was an ad campaign for Elizabeth Taylor's White Diamonds, eventually the world's top-selling celebrity fragrance.

In 2009, she contributed designs for Madonna to wear in her photo shoot with model Jesus Luz for W Magazine. In 2011, Scott styled actress Julia Roberts for a W Magazine shoot, alongside Tom Hanks. She designed costumes for such films as Diabolique (1996 remake), Ocean's Thirteen, Eyes Wide Shut, and Shine a Light, a documentary by Martin Scorsese about The Rolling Stones, with Mick Jagger, with whom she had been romantically linked since 2001.

== Designer ==
L'Wren Scott logo

Scott told Vogue in 2009, "I trusted my instincts and stuck to what I believed in." She designed clothing, makeup, perfume, handbags, shoes, and eyeglasses.

=== Silhouette ===
From the L'Wren Scott "Madame DuBarry" Collection, Spring 2010

"I like a very sexy silhouette, and I like to feel like when you put something on, you zip yourself into it, and you're secure in there", Scott said. Net-A-Porter wrote that her designs have a "seductive, old-world feel: super-feminine silhouettes; rigorous cuts; nipped-in waists; pencil skirts, high-collared blouses; elegant, long-sleeved dresses."

Scott was well known for her attention to detail. She was a hands-on designer, sourcing, often cutting patterns, sewing, and fitting many of the clothes herself.

=== "L'Wrenisms" ===
As a designer, she had developed what her followers called "L'Wrenisms", which were style tips. As quoted in The Sunday Times, they are an eccentric mix of opinions and practical tips. They include:

- Wear a nude shoe to elongate the leg.
- Spray perfume on the back of the hand, rather than the wrist, because it is more elegant.
- Don't eat with a plastic fork.
- Avoid drinking out of a bottle if possible.
- Avoid bras and Spanx. Scott believed that a well-designed garment should do it all for the wearer.

=== Inspiration ===
In a backstage interview with Harriet Mays Powell of New York, Scott described her design process. She started with color, then designed fabrics, and then the clothes. Her inspiration was found in nature and in things around her. Several collections, most especially her Madame DuBarry (SS 2011), as well as the inclusion of peony shirts, scarf, and pants in her Banana Republic collection, reflect this nature-based inspiration.

== Collaborations and collections ==
In 2006, Scott launched her first collection, "Little Black Dress". It presented black dresses, including her now famous "Headmistress" dress worn by Madonna.

Scott's creations were seen often on the red carpet. Sarah Jessica Parker, Angelina Jolie, Nicole Kidman, Penélope Cruz, and Amy Adams have all worn Scott's dresses to the Academy Awards.

First Lady Michelle Obama also favored Scott's designs, especially embellished cardigan sweaters. The former First Lady of France Carla Bruni-Sarkozy wore Scott's designs, as did Naomi Campbell, Marion Cotillard, Reese Witherspoon, Christina Hendricks, Jennifer Lopez, and Sandra Bullock.

In 2010, Scott collaborated with Lancôme to create a capsule collection for the 2010 holiday season featuring a lipstick in her signature bordeaux color. Photographer Mario Testino shot the campaign, which featured model Daria Werbowy wearing an outfit designed by Scott.

May 2011 saw the launch of Scott's first collection of handbags, named "Lula" after her mother. The line was launched at Barneys New York, with a personal appearance by Scott.

In 2012, Scott launched her eponymous scent sold exclusively at Barney's. The scent is an eau de parfum priced at $195 for 3.4 oz. She also launched an eyewear line that year. The collection debuted at Vision Expo East, and was a collaborative partnership with the German-based Menrad Group.

The L'Wren Scott collections were:

- 2008: Purple Haze (Fall-Winter), and Dragonfly Blues (Spring-Summer);
- 2009: Bois de Boulogne (FW) and Zephyr (SS).
- 2010: Tuxedo Terrace (FW), and Madame du Barry (SS)
- 2011: A Tropical Conversation (FW), and Serengeti Sunset (SS)
- 2012: Tea Time (FW) and Beau Monde (SS)
- 2013: Propaganda (RST), Yorkshire Pudding (SS), and Allegory of Love (FW)
- 2014: Tagasode (SS).

In February 2014, the London Fashion Week showing of her fall 2014 collection was canceled, citing delays in production. It was announced that the collection would be revealed via social media, and be presented in her Paris showroom to editors and retail buyers in March.

In 2013, Scott collaborated with Banana Republic with an exclusive holiday collection including apparel and accessories for women. The collection was her first foray into an affordable line of ready-to-wear, and included scarves, jeans, purses, sweaters, pajamas, and cocktail dresses. It launched on December 5, with an opening attended by celebrities dressed in the clothing.

Scott collaborated with makeup artist and brand Bobbi Brown to create lip glosses, eyeshadows and cheek color, which came out in 2014. In 2013, she also designed a limited edition bottle for Caudalie's Beauty Elixir.

=== The Rolling Stones ===
Scott collaborated with Mick Jagger to design his costumes for Rolling Stones tours. These included a gorilla coat covered in ostrich feathers, a green jacket that Scott dubbed "Glamouflage", a black jacket with butterflies, and an embroidered gold jacket inspired by Gustav Klimt.

== Personal life ==
Scott was married twice. From 1990 to 1993, as "Lauren Scott", she was married to British property developer Andrew Ladsky. In 1993, one month after divorcing Ladsky, she married Anthony Brand, manager of a Prada franchise in Beverly Hills. The marriage lasted about a year. The divorce was finalized in 1997.

Her longest relationship was with Rolling Stones frontman Mick Jagger, whom she met around 2001. The couple lived in London, New York City, France, and Mustique. Scott's siblings have divided opinions about the relationship.

== Death ==
After a long period of depression, Scott was found dead by her assistant at her apartment in the Chelsea neighborhood of Manhattan on March 17, 2014. The police reported no note was found and there was no sign of foul play. The New York City Chief Medical Examiner determined Scott's death to be suicide by hanging. She was 49.

Upon learning of her death, Jagger wrote on his website and on his official Facebook page:

I am still struggling to understand how my lover and best friend could end her life in this tragic way. We spent many wonderful years together and had made a great life for ourselves. She had great presence and her talent was much admired, not least by me. I have been touched by the tributes that people have paid to her, and also the personal messages of support that I have received. I will never forget her.

A memorial in Utah on April 12, 2014, was led by her brother Randall Bambrough. Bambrough urged people to remember Scott as "a wonderful, terrific person who was highly talented and had a very large heart and brought the best out in people." Her ashes were buried next to her parents, Ivan and Lula Bambrough, near the family home in Ogden, Utah. A final memorial was held in New York City on May 2, 2014, led by Jagger and Randall Bambrough.

== Legacy ==
In January 2015, it was announced that Jagger had created a three-year scholarship fund in her name for fashion design students at the London-based school Central Saint Martins. The scholarship, which began in October 2015, covers all the fees for one student each year, over the course of three years (through 2017).

In the weeks following Scott's death, both her Banana Republic collection and her higher-priced line at Barneys New York sold out. She left her entire estate, estimated at $9 million, to Jagger.

In 2021, Christie's organized a sale of clothes Scott had designed for Jagger. The proceeds, totalling over £365,000, went to the scholarship fund Jagger created.
