= Garrison Grimes =

American football player (born 2001)

Profile
- Position: Long snapper

Personal information
- Born: March 15, 2001 (age 25)
- Listed height: 6 ft 2 in (1.88 m)
- Listed weight: 220 lb (100 kg)

Career information
- High school: American Fork (American Fork, Utah)
- College: Baylor (2021–2024); BYU (2025)
- NFL draft: 2026: undrafted

Career history
- New York Jets (2026)*
- * Offseason or practice squad member only

Garrison Grimes (born March 15, 2001) is an American professional football long snapper. He played college football for the Baylor Bears and BYU Cougars.

== Early life ==
Grimes attended American Fork High School in American Fork, Utah, and committed to play college football for the Baylor Bears.

== College career ==
Grimes was a three-year starter at Baylor from 2022 to 2024, with his only missed games coming in 2023 after he suffered an ACL tear. He also recovered two fumbles during his tenure as a Bear. After the 2024 season, Grimes entered the NCAA transfer portal.

Grimes transferred to play for the BYU Cougars. Heading into the 2025 season, he earned the Cougars starting long snapper job. During the 2025 season, Grimes was perfect on all 114 of his snaps, earning Second Team All-American honors from the AFCA. After the conclusion of the season, he declared for the 2026 NFL draft.

== Professional career ==
Pre-draft measurables
Height	Weight	Arm length	Hand span	Wingspan	40-yard dash	10-yard split	20-yard split	Vertical jump	Broad jump	Bench press
6 ft 2 1/4 in (1.89 m)	236 lb (107 kg)	32 in (0.81 m)	9 1/4 in (0.23 m)	6 ft 6 1/8 in (1.98 m)	4.82 s	1.62 s	2.75 s	32.5 in (0.83 m)	9 ft 7 in (2.92 m)	22 reps
All values from Pro Day

After not being selected in the 2026 NFL draft, Grimes signed with the New York Jets as an undrafted free agent. On August 1, 2026, he was waived.

== Personal life ==
Grimes is the son of college football coach Jeff Grimes.
