= Andrew Gentry =

American football player (born 2001)

No. 75 – BYU Cougars
- Position: Offensive tackle
- Class: Redshirt Senior

Personal information
- Born: October 26, 2001 (age 25)
- Listed height: 6 ft 8 in (2.03 m)
- Listed weight: 310 lb (141 kg)

Career information
- High school: Columbine (Columbine, Colorado)
- College: Michigan (2022–2024); BYU (2025–present)

Awards and highlights
- CFP national champion (2023)
- Stats at ESPN

Andrew Gentry (born October 26, 2001) is an American football offensive lineman for the BYU Cougars. He previously played for the Michigan Wolverines.

== Early life ==
Gentry attended Columbine High School in Columbine, Colorado. He committed to play college football for the Virginia Cavaliers over offers from other schools such as Alabama, Michigan, and Notre Dame. However, Gentry later flipped his commitment to play for the Michigan Wolverines.

== College career ==
As a freshman in 2022, Gentry played in three game and took a redshirt. In 2023, he played in all 15 games, helping the Wolverines win a National Championship. During the 2024 season, Gentry played in eight games with two starts. After the season, he entered the NCAA transfer portal.

Gentry transferred to play for the BYU Cougars. During the 2025 season, he started in all 14 games for the Cougars.

== Personal life ==
Gentry is the son of former BYU and Utah State basketball player Todd Gentry and the younger brother of former BYU offensive tackle JT Gentry.
