= Keanu Tanuvasa =

American football player (born 2002)

No. 57 – BYU Cougars
- Position: Defensive tackle
- Class: Redshirt Junior

Personal information
- Born: June 2002 (age 24)
- Listed height: 6 ft 4 in (1.93 m)
- Listed weight: 300 lb (136 kg)

Career information
- High school: Mission Viejo (Mission Viejo, California)
- College: Utah (2022–2024); BYU (2025–present)

Keanu Tanuvasa (born June 2002) is an American college football defensive tackle for the BYU Cougars. He previously played for the Utah Utes.

== Early life ==
Tanuvasa was born in June 2002 and grew up in Orange County, California. His father, Shawn, played for the Utah Utes, while his grandparents are from Samoa. He attended Mission Viejo High School where he played football as a defensive lineman and also basketball, being a two-time all-league selection in football. As a senior in 2019, he was named first-team all-county after totaling 40 tackles, 12 tackles-for-loss and 5.0 sacks. He participated at the Polynesian Bowl at the conclusion of his high school career. He was a three-star prospect and committed to play college football for the Utah Utes, but, before enrolling, served a two-year mission for The Church of Jesus Christ of Latter-day Saints.

== College career ==
As a true freshman for the Utes in 2022, Tanuvasa redshirted and appeared in four games, totaling six tackles and 1.5 tackles-for-loss. He then started all 13 games at defensive tackle, recording 27 tackles, six TFLs, and two sacks while being named a Freshman All-American by College Football Network. He battled injuries during the 2024 season, only appearing in seven games while recording 17 tackles, 4.5 TFLs and a sack. He was named honorable mention All-Big 12 Conference for the 2024 season. He transferred to the BYU Cougars for the 2025 season.
