= Evan Johnson (American football) =

American football player

No. 0 – BYU Cougars
- Position: Cornerback
- Class: Redshirt Senior

Personal information
- Listed height: 6 ft 0 in (1.83 m)
- Listed weight: 185 lb (84 kg)

Career information
- High school: Stevenson (Pebble Beach, California)
- College: BYU (2022–present)
- Stats at ESPN

Evan Johnson is an American football cornerback for the BYU Cougars.

== Early life ==
Johnson attended high school at Stevenson School located in Pebble Beach, California. Coming out of high school, he committed to play college football for the BYU Cougars.

== College career ==
During his first two seasons from 2022 through 2023, Johnson played in six games, recording two tackles. He appeared in 12 games in 2024 while making four starts, totaling 16 tackles, two pass deflections, and two interceptions. In week 4 of the 2025 season, Johnson had two interceptions, one of which he returned for a touchdown in a victory over East Carolina. In week 12, he notched his first career sack in a victory against TCU.

== Personal life ==
Johnson is the son of former NFL wide receiver Ronald J. Johnson.
