= Chase Roberts =

American football player (born 2001)

Profile
- Position: Wide receiver

Personal information
- Born: January 21, 2001 (age 25); Highland, Utah
- Listed height: 6 ft 3 in (1.91 m)
- Listed weight: 209 lb (95 kg)

Career information
- High school: American Fork (American Fork, Utah)
- College: BYU (2021–2025)
- NFL draft: 2026: undrafted

Career history
- Las Vegas Raiders (2026)*
- * Offseason or practice squad member only

Awards and highlights
- Third-team All-Big 12 (2025)
- Stats at Pro Football Reference

Chase Roberts (born January 21, 2001) is an American professional football wide receiver. He played college football for the BYU Cougars.

== Early life ==
Roberts attended American Fork High School in American Fork, Utah. As a junior, he caught 68 passes for 1,200 yards and 15 touchdowns. Roberts was named an Under Armour All-American as a senior. He finished his high school career with 217 receptions for 3,708 yards and 42 touchdowns, placing him fifth in Utah high school history. Roberts committed to play college football for the BYU Cougars.

== College career ==
As a freshman in 2021, Roberts did not appear in any games due to an injury and was redshirted. In week 2 of the 2022 season, he tallied eight receptions for 122 yards and a touchdown, while also throwing for a 22-yard touchdown in a win over Baylor. During the 2022 season, Roberts appeared in 11 games with three starts, where he totaled 22 receptions for 357 yards and three touchdowns. In week 3 of the 2023 season, he brought down a one-handed touchdown in a win over Arkansas, earning the top play of the day on ESPN’s “SportsCenter”. In the 2023 season, Roberts made 11 starts, where he totaled 42 catches for 573 yards and five touchdowns. In week 3 of the 2024 season, he hauled in six receptions for 126 yards in a win over Wyoming. In week 5, Roberts brought in a game-winning touchdown reception against Baylor. He finished the 2024 season with 52 catches for 854 yards and four touchdowns.

== Professional career ==
Pre-draft measurables
Height	Weight	Arm length	Hand span	Wingspan	40-yard dash	10-yard split	20-yard split	20-yard shuttle	Three-cone drill	Vertical jump	Broad jump
6 ft 3 1/4 in (1.91 m)	209 lb (95 kg)	31 1/2 in (0.80 m)	9 3/4 in (0.25 m)	6 ft 5 1/4 in (1.96 m)	4.57 s	1.61 s	2.60 s	4.33 s	6.89 s	37.0 in (0.94 m)	10 ft 6 in (3.20 m)
All values from NFL Combine/Pro Day

Roberts signed with the Las Vegas Raiders as an undrafted free agent on April 30, 2026. He was waived/injured by the team on August 30.
