= Bear Bachmeier =

American football player

No. 47 – BYU Cougars
- Position: Quarterback
- Class: Sophomore

Personal information
- Born: September 21, 2006 (age 20)
- Listed height: 6 ft 2 in (1.88 m)
- Listed weight: 230 lb (104 kg)

Career information
- High school: Murrieta Valley (Murrieta, California)
- College: BYU (2025–present)

Awards and highlights
- Big 12 Offensive Freshman of the Year (2025); 2025 Pop-Tarts Bowl MVP
- Stats at ESPN

Michael "Bear" Bachmeier is an American college football quarterback for the BYU Cougars.

== Early life ==
Bachmeier attended Murrieta Valley High School located in Murrieta, California, alongside his brother Tiger. During his sophomore season, he threw for 2,853 yards and 26 touchdowns, while also adding 644 yards and 18 touchdowns on the ground. In his senior year, Bachmeier missed the first eight games with a knee injury but returned leading his school to the Division 2 title game. Coming out of high school, he was rated as a four star recruit and the 262nd overall player in the class of 2025, where he committed to play college football for the Stanford Cardinal over Oregon, Arkansas, Michigan State, Alabama, Notre Dame, Texas A&M, and Michigan.

== College career ==
=== Stanford ===
After enrolling early at Stanford for the 2025 season, Bachmeier decided to enter the transfer portal during spring practices.

=== BYU ===
Bachmeier decided to transfer to play for the BYU Cougars alongside his brother Tiger. Heading into the 2025 season after BYU starter Jake Retzlaff was suspended and subsequently transferred, he competed for the starting job against McCae Hillstead and Treyson Bourguet. On August 19, Bachmeier was named the starting quarterback for the Cougars, after several rumors suggesting the same, making him the first true freshman in school history to start a season opener. Bear help lead BYU to overcome an 11-point deficit at the 2025 Pop-Tarts Bowl.

=== Statistics ===
Season	Team	Games			Passing								Rushing				Receiving			
Season	Team	GP	GS	Record	Cmp	Att	Pct	Yds	Y/A	TD	Int	Rtg	Att	Yds	Avg	TD	Rec	Yds	Avg	TD
2025	BYU	14	14	12–2	251	387	64.9	3,033	7.8	15	7	139.9	147	527	3.6	11	1	3	3.0	0
2026	BYU	9	9	7–2	156	249	62.7	2,022	8.1	13	8	141.7	88	395	4.6	7	1	15	15.0	1
Career		23	23	19–4	407	636	64.0	5,055	7.9	28	15	140.6	235	922	3.9	18	2	18	9.0	1

== Personal life ==
Bachmeier was raised Catholic and is the younger brother of wide receiver Tiger Bachmeier, with whom he plays at BYU, and former collegiate quarterback Hank Bachmeier. Bachmeier's mother, April, is from Thailand.
