= Will Ferrin =

American football player (born 2000)

Profile
- Position: Placekicker

Personal information
- Born: October 10, 2000 (age 26); Lindon, Utah, U.S.
- Listed height: 6 ft 3 in (1.91 m)
- Listed weight: 175 lb (79 kg)

Career information
- High school: Davis (Kaysville, Utah)
- College: Boise State (2021–2022); BYU (2023–2025)
- NFL draft: 2026: undrafted

Career history
- New York Jets (2026)*
- * Offseason or practice squad member only

Awards and highlights
- Big 12 Special Teams Player of the Year (2024); First-team All-Big 12 (2024); Second-team All-Big 12 (2025)
- Stats at Pro Football Reference

Will Ferrin (born October 10, 2000) is an American professional football kicker. He played college football for the Boise State Broncos, and BYU Cougars.

== Early life ==
Ferrin attended Davis High School in Kaysville, Utah. Coming out of high school, he initially committed to play college football for the Utah State Aggies, but later flipped his commitment and signed to play for the Boise State Broncos.

== College career ==
=== Boise State ===
During his two-year career as a Bronco from 2021 to 2022, Ferrin did not attempt a field goal or an extra point, but kicked off 45 times, with 20 touchbacks. After the 2022 season, Ferrin entered the NCAA transfer portal.

=== BYU ===
Ferrin transferred to play for the BYU Cougars. As the starting kicker for the Cougars in 2023, he went 11 for 14 on field goals with a long of 49 yards, while also making 32 of his 33 extra points. In week 11 of the 2024 season, Ferrin hit the game-winning 44-yard field goal against rival Utah. In the 2024 Alamo Bowl, he converted from 51 and 54 yards in a victory over Colorado. Ferrin finished the 2024 season, converting on 24 of his 27 field goal attempts and all 41 of his extra points. For his performance he was named Big 12 Co-Special Teams Player of the Year, Big 12 Kicker of the Year by the College Football Network, and to the All-Big 12 First Team. In the 2025 season opener, Ferrin converted on all nine of his extra point attempts and both of his field goal attempts, including a career-long and program-tying 56-yard field goal in a blowout win over Portland State. In week 2, he went four for four on his kicks in a victory versus Stanford.

== Professional career ==
Pre-draft measurables
Height	Weight	Arm length	Hand span	Wingspan
6 ft 2 3/4 in (1.90 m)	175 lb (79 kg)	30 3/8 in (0.77 m)	8 5/8 in (0.22 m)	6 ft 0 7/8 in (1.85 m)
All values from Pro Day

On May 8, 2026, Ferrin signed with the New York Jets as an undrafted free agent. Ferrin was released by the Jets on May 14.
