= Parker Kingston =

American football player

Profile
- Position: Wide receiver
- Class: Redshirt Junior

Personal information
- Listed height: 5 ft 11 in (1.80 m)
- Listed weight: 185 lb (84 kg)

Career information
- High school: Roy (Roy, Utah)
- College: BYU (2022–2025)

Awards and highlights
- First-team All-Big 12 (2025)
- Stats at ESPN

Parker Kingston is an American college football wide receiver who previously played for the BYU Cougars.

== Early life ==
Kingston was born in Idaho, and attended Roy High School in Roy, Utah, where he totaled 2,649 passing yards, 2,136 rushing yards, 542 receiving yards, and 64 total touchdowns. He was rated as a three-star recruit and committed to play college football for the BYU Cougars.

== College career ==
As a freshman in 2022, Kingston played in just one game where he rushed once for two yards. In week 3 of the 2023 season, he threw for a 37-yard touchdown, hauled in a 20-yard touchdown reception, and returned a kickoff for 46 yards in a win over Arkansas. Kingston finished the 2023 season with 19 receptions for 207 yards and a touchdown, while also adding four yards on the ground, two passing touchdowns, 215 return yards, and a tackle. In week 4 of the 2024 season, he returned a punt 90 yards for a touchdown in an upset win over Kansas State.

== Legal issues ==
On February 11, 2026, Kingston was charged with and held without bail in Washington County, Utah, for first-degree felony rape, following an investigation into a 20-year-old woman reporting a sexual assault on February 23, 2025. On February 13, 2026, it was announced that Kingston was no longer a BYU student and not part of the football program shortly after being released on bond. The case was dismissed without prejudice on June 18, 2026. On November 12, 2026 first-degree felony rape charges were refiled against former BYU football player Parker Kingston in Washington County.
