= Carsen Ryan =

American football player (born 2003)

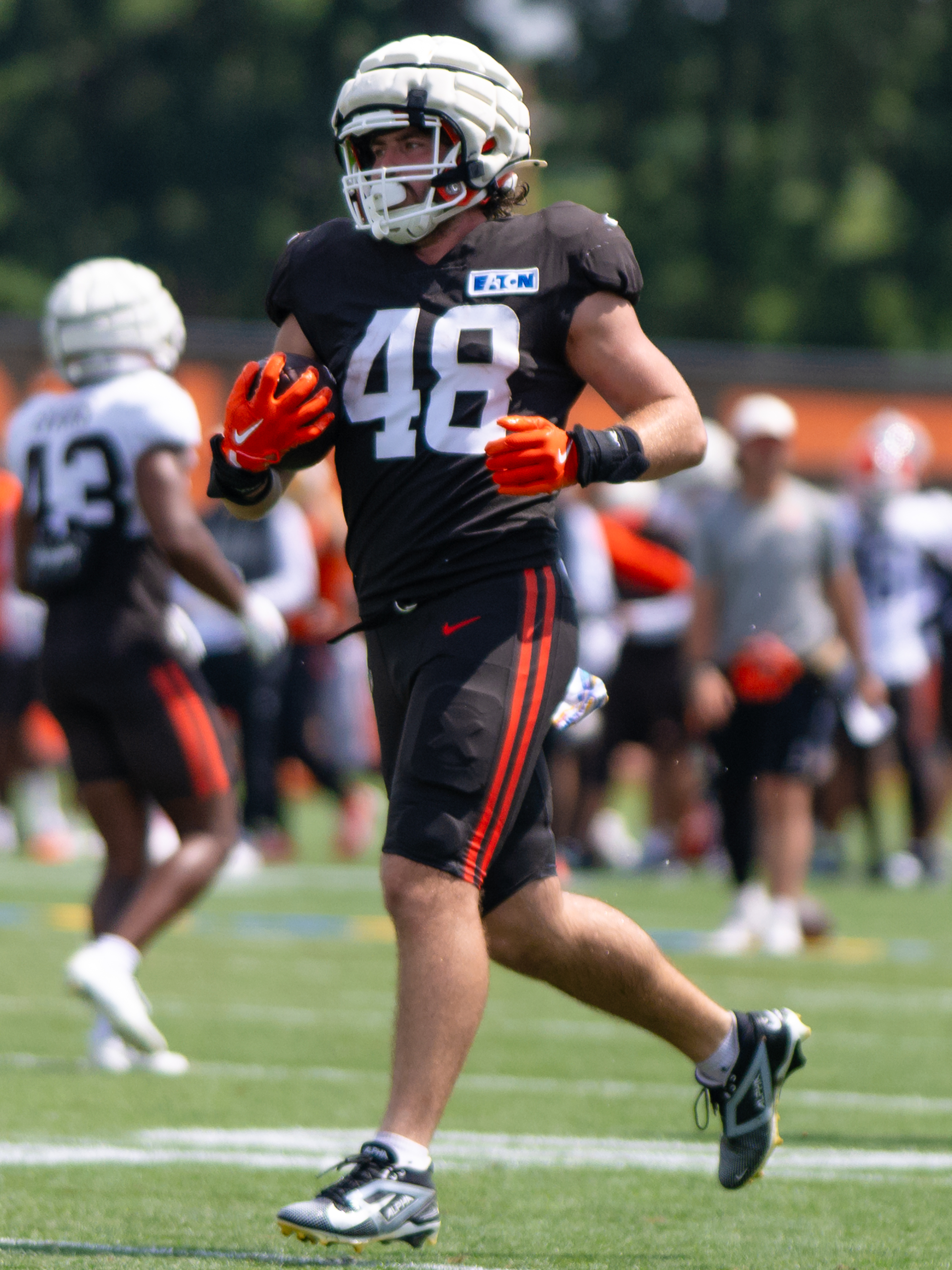
- Ryan with the Cleveland Browns in 2026

No. 48 – Cleveland Browns
- Position: Tight end
- Roster status: Practice squad

Personal information
- Born: August 21, 2003 (age 23)
- Listed height: 6 ft 3 in (1.91 m)
- Listed weight: 255 lb (116 kg)

Career information
- High school: American Fork (American Fork, Utah)
- College: UCLA (2022–2023); Utah (2024); BYU (2025)
- NFL draft: 2026: 7th round, 248th overall pick

Career history
- Cleveland Browns (2026–present)
- Stats at Pro Football Reference

Carsen Ryan (born August 22, 2003) is an American professional football tight end for the Cleveland Browns of the National Football League (NFL). He played college football for the BYU Cougars, UCLA Bruins, and Utah Utes. Ryan was selected by the Cleveland Browns in the seventh round of the 2026 NFL draft.

== Early life ==
Ryan grew up in Orem, Utah and attended Timpview High School in Provo, Utah until his senior season when he transferred to American Fork High School in American Fork, Utah. During his senior season, hauled in 53 receptions for 609 yards and three touchdowns. Coming out of high school, Ryan was rated as a four-star recruit and committed to play college football for the UCLA Bruins over offers from other schools such as BYU, Nebraska, Washington, Colorado, Virginia, Boise State, San Diego State, and Kansas.

== College career ==
=== UCLA ===
As a freshman in 2022, Ryan posted six receptions for 82 yards. In the 2023 season, he recorded 13 receptions for 205 yards and three touchdowns. After the season, Ryan entered his name into the NCAA transfer portal.

=== Utah ===
Ryan transferred to play for the Utah Utes. In week 12 of the 2024 season, he recorded four catches for 78 yards in a loss to Colorado. During the 2024 season, Ryan hauled in ten passes for 113 yards and a touchdown. After the season, he once again entered his name into the NCAA transfer portal.

=== BYU ===
Ryan transferred to play for the BYU Cougars. He entered the 2025 season as an immediate starter for the Cougars. In week one of the 2025 season, Ryan hauled in his first touchdown as a Cougar in a victory over Portland State. In week 3, he notched four catches for 63 yards and a touchdown in a win against East Carolina. He had 45 catches for 620 yards and three touchdowns on the season.

== Professional career ==
Pre-draft measurables
| Height | Weight | Arm length | Hand span | Wingspan | 40-yard dash | 10-yard split | 20-yard split | 20-yard shuttle | Three-cone drill | Vertical jump | Broad jump | Bench press |
|---|---|---|---|---|---|---|---|---|---|---|---|---|
| 6 ft 3 3/8 in (1.91 m) | 255 lb (116 kg) | 31 3/8 in (0.80 m) | 10 in (0.25 m) | 6 ft 5 3/8 in (1.97 m) | 4.72 s | 1.60 s | 2.68 s | 4.22 s | 6.97 s | 33.5 in (0.85 m) | 9 ft 7 in (2.92 m) | 23 reps |
All values from Pro Day

Ryan was selected by the Cleveland Browns in the seventh round, 248th overall, of the 2026 NFL draft. On October 26, 2026, Ryan was waived and re-signed to the practice squad two days later. He was promoted to the active roster on November 4 but was waived the next day and re-signed to the practice squad. He was promoted back to the active roster on November 14 and waived three days later. On Novemver 19, Ryan signed with the practice squad.

== Personal life ==
Ryan's father Chas Ryan played collegiate football at Snow College and William & Penn.
