= Coach Prime (TV series) =

American documentary TV series

- Genre: Sports documentary
- Starring: Deion Sanders
- Country of origin: United States
- Original language: English
- No. of seasons: 3
- No. of episodes: 15

Production
- Executive producers: Jamie Elias; Michael Gleaton; Constance Schwartz-Morini; FredAnthony Smith; Michael Strahan
- Production locations: Jackson, Mississippi (season 1); Boulder, Colorado (seasons 2–3)
- Cinematography: Gregory Kerrick (season 1); Micah Brown (season 2)
- Editor: Jeff Tober
- Running time: 38–64 minutes
- Production companies: SMAC Entertainment; Prime Video Sports

Original release
- Network: Prime Video
- Release: December 29, 2022 – present

Coach Prime is an American television documentary series about college football head coach Deion Sanders.

On April 26, 2023, Sanders announced that Prime Video Sports renewed the show for the 2023 season during an interview on The Pat McAfee Show. This new season takes place in Boulder, Colorado, where Sanders looks to transform a Colorado team that went 1–11 in 2022. On May 14, 2024, Amazon announced that the show would be renewed for a third season which premiered on January 7, 2025.

== Summary ==
The docuseries follows Deion Sanders (nicknamed "Prime Time"), head coach of the Jackson State University Tigers football team, on and off the field. During the team's 2022 undefeated SWAC championship season, the team had to contend with a water crisis in Jackson, Mississippi, with players moving to different locations, and Sanders guiding them through the crisis.

== Cast ==
- Deion Sanders
- Shedeur Sanders
- Travis Hunter
- Andre' Hart
- Lauren Askevold
- Gary Harrell
- Anthony Balancier
- Trevor Reilly
- Shelomi Sanders
- Tim Brewster (seasons 1–2)
- Sam Morini
- Shilo Sanders
- De'Jahn Warren (season 1)
- Isaiah Bolden (season 1)
- Aubrey Miller Jr. (season 1)
- Xavier Weaver (season 2)
- Dylan Edwards (season 2)
- Rick George (season 2–present)
- Cormani McClain (season 2)
- Jimmy Horn Jr. (season 2–present)
- Pat Shurmur (season 2–present)
- Dennis Thurman (season 2)

== Production ==
An earlier series, also named Coach Prime, was originally launched by SMAC Entertainment in 2021 as a six-episode documentary series following Deion Sanders in his first year as head coach of the Jackson State Tigers, airing on Barstool Sports' YouTube channel starting on August 29, 2021. A second six-episode season was released on Barstool on March 6, 2022.

On October 12, 2022, Coach Prime was announced as a four-part docuseries that would premiere on Prime Video in December 2022. The docuseries is produced by Prime Video Sports and SMAC Productions, and executive produced by Michael Strahan, Constance Schwartz-Morini and FredAnthony Smith. Michael Gleaton is showrunner and executive producer.

On August 21, 2023, it was announced that SMAC Entertainment reached a deal with the University of Colorado to film the docuseries on campus.

== Seasons ==
Season	Episodes	Originally released	
Season	Episodes	First released	Last released
1	4	December 29, 2022	January 5, 2023
2	6	December 7, 2023	January 4, 2024
3	5	January 7, 2025	

== Prime Video Release ==
The official trailer was released on December 15, 2022. The first two parts of the four-part docuseries premiered on Prime Video on December 29, 2022.

=== Season 1 (2022) ===
No. overall	No. in season	Title	Directed by	Original release date
1	1	"All Eyes on Jackson"	Michael Gleaton	December 29, 2022
Coach Prime meets face to face with Nick Saban for the first time since Saban's criticism about his recruiting tactics at Jackson State. At the first ever XFL/HBCU Combine, Dwayne "The Rock" Johnson gives a motivational speech about being counted out early in his career. In the preseason, Coach Prime throws his birthday party with special guest Master P. Right before the season starts the City of Jackson is facing a water crisis, declaring a State of Emergency. Coach Prime quickly takes action ensuring his players have safe water by moving them to a nearby town to complete training camp. In their new home, he quickly resets expectations with his team after seeing bad habits setting into place. With Travis Hunter battling injuries in camp, Coach Prime mulls over how to best manage his 5-star recruit without risking further injury. Quickly we're shown the juxtaposition many of these players face; inching closer to their NFL dreams, while back home the struggles continue and survival is everything. The team heads down to Miami ahead of their season opener against Florida A&M. Coach Prime continues to advocate for clean water in Jackson during media availability, then Michael Vick and Warren Sapp pay a visit to the team in the final days of practice. Travis is still struggling with his injury ahead of the first game and unsure of his playing status. As the game sets to kick off, Coach Prime delivers a powerful speech inspired from the Book of Genesis.
2	2	"More Than a Game"	Michael Gleaton	December 29, 2022
Facing an early 0-3 deficit to Tennessee State, Coach Prime is seen coaching his team up on the sideline looking for a better effort to turn it around. The team is now a week away from their first home game and the water crisis is yet to be resolved. Later the team takes a day to help bring water to residents throughout City of Jackson. NFL Scouts are in attendance at practice ahead of the home opener against Grambling State. Coach Prime addresses Travis' injury status, as well as the challenges their program is faced when properly staffing the trainers to take care of their student-athletes. Once at risk for losing his leg to amputation, he recalls his multiple surgeries but despite the adversity continues to be present for his team. After a fast start in the next game, the team faces challenges with their focus late in the 1st half. In response to a series of uncharacteristic mistakes, Coach Prime demands his leaders step up, and in the 2nd half the Tigers begin to impose their will on the opponent. Led by the playmaking skills of Shedeur Sanders, the team delivers against the hype.
3	3	"Homecoming, JSU Style"	Michael Gleaton	January 5, 2023
After another win, sparks fly between Coach Prime and Coach Robinson of Alabama State, with the latter questioning Coach Prime's contributions to the SWAC. It's now Homecoming Week at Jackson State and with the SWAC conversation still buzzing a new song emerges "Who is SWAC, if I Ain't SWAC?", meanwhile at practice the team is as locked in as ever preparing the play Campbell at home. Later we learn about the history of Homecoming at Jackson State, and what it means to have a team like this especially for the alumni. At the game, Coach Prime brings the stars out with Snoop Dogg and Rick Ross both in attendance for the game. Travis is finally healthy and the team looks to see how they look with their dynamic two-way player. Travis rehabs his injury as Coach Prime keeps a watchful eye on the rest of his players during an eventful week leading up to the homecoming game.
4	4	"The Perfect Season"	Michael Gleaton	January 5, 2023
During a team meeting, Coach Prime leaves his players to make a tough decision. After taking a vote they eventually decide to dismiss one of their own after breaking multiple team rules. For their next matchup College GameDay makes an historic visit to Jackson State, while recruiting continues in full swing and rumors begin to swirl about a possible move by Coach Prime just before the SWAC Championship.

=== Season 2 (2023) ===
Season 2 premiered on December 7, 2023 and followed Sanders throughout his inaugural season at the University of Colorado Boulder with the Colorado Buffaloes.

No. overall	No. in season	Title	Directed by	Original release date
5	1	"We Coming"	Micah Brown	December 7, 2023
6	2	"Put Up or Shut Up"	Micah Brown	December 7, 2023
7	3	"It's Personal"	Micah Brown	December 14, 2023
8	4	"This Is Why We're Here"	Micah Brown	December 21, 2023
9	5	"Soul Searching"	Micah Brown	December 28, 2023
10	6	"Only The Beginning"	Micah Brown	January 4, 2024

=== Season 3 (2025) ===
Season 3 premiered on January 7, 2025 and followed Sanders throughout his second season at the University of Colorado Boulder with the Colorado Buffaloes.

No. overall	No. in season	Title	Directed by	Original release date
11	1	"Second Chances"	Micah Brown	January 7, 2025
12	2	"The Weight of The Game"	Micah Brown	January 7, 2025
13	3	"The Hype is Back"	Micah Brown	January 7, 2025
14	4	"Above the Noise"	Micah Brown	January 7, 2025
15	5	"End of an Era"	Micah Brown	January 7, 2025
