= 2023 Colorado Buffaloes football team =

American college football season

2023 Colorado Buffaloes football
- Conference: Pac-12 Conference
- Record: 4–8 (1–8 Pac-12)
- Head coach: Deion Sanders (1st season)
- Offensive coordinator: Sean Lewis (1st season)
- Co-offensive coordinator: Pat Shurmur (1st season)
- Offensive scheme: Veer and shoot
- Defensive coordinator: Charles Kelly (1st season)
- Base defense: Multiple
- Home stadium: Folsom Field

Uniform
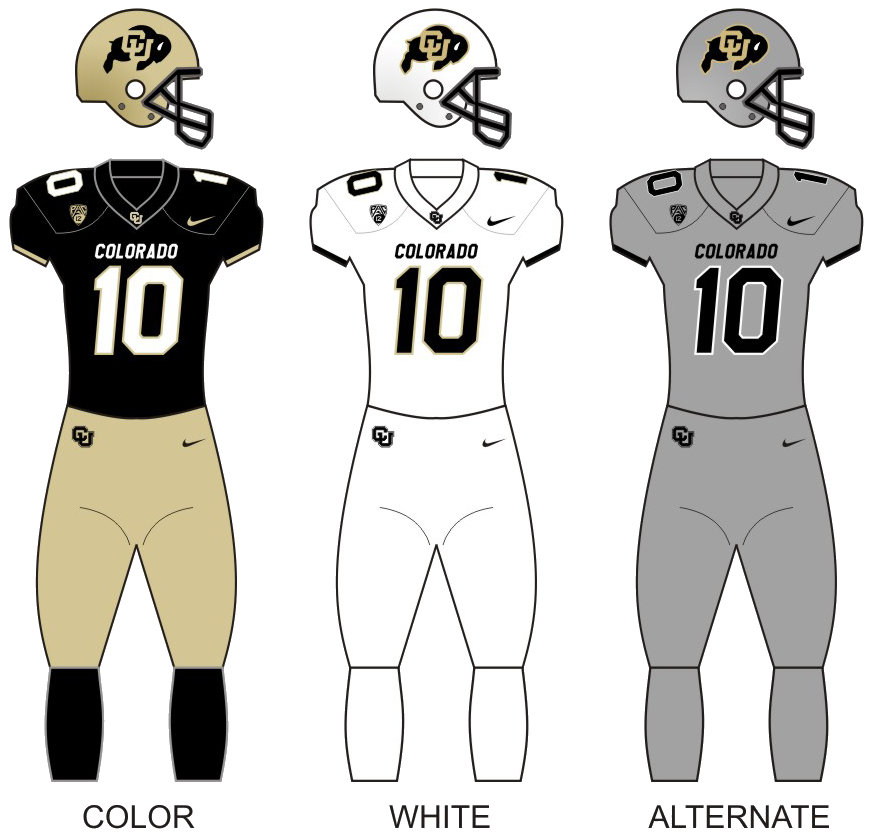

2023 Pac-12 Conference football standings
| | Conf. | | | Overall |
| Team | W | | L | W | | L |
|---|---|---|---|---|---|---|
| No. 2 Washington y$^ | 9 | – | 0 | 14 | – | 1 |
| No. 6 Oregon y | 8 | – | 1 | 12 | – | 2 |
| No. 11 Arizona | 7 | – | 2 | 10 | – | 3 |
| Oregon State | 5 | – | 4 | 8 | – | 5 |
| Utah | 5 | – | 4 | 8 | – | 5 |
| USC | 5 | – | 4 | 8 | – | 5 |
| California | 4 | – | 5 | 6 | – | 7 |
| UCLA | 4 | – | 5 | 8 | – | 5 |
| Washington State | 2 | – | 7 | 5 | – | 7 |
| Stanford | 2 | – | 7 | 3 | – | 9 |
| Arizona State* | 2 | – | 7 | 3 | – | 9 |
| Colorado | 1 | – | 8 | 4 | – | 8 |
Championship: Washington 34, Oregon 31
^ – College Football Playoff participant; $ – Conference champion; y – Championship game participant; * – Ineligible for postseason play due to self-imposed ban for 2020 recruiting violations; Rankings from AP Poll

The 2023 Colorado Buffaloes football team represented the University of Colorado Boulder as a member of the Pac-12 Conference during the 2023 NCAA Division I FBS football season. This was the program's 13th and final year in the Pac-12 before they rejoined the Big 12 Conference in 2024. The Buffaloes were led by first-year head coach Deion Sanders. They played their home games on campus at Folsom Field in Boulder, Colorado. The Colorado Buffaloes football team drew an average home attendance of 53,180 in 2023, the 36th highest in college football.

== Schedule ==
The Colorado Buffaloes and the Pac-12 announced the 2023 football schedule on January 18, 2023.

| Date | Time | Opponent | Rank | Site | TV | Result | Attendance |
|---|---|---|---|---|---|---|---|
| September 2 | 10:00 a.m. | at No. 17 TCU* | | Amon G. Carter Stadium; Fort Worth, TX (Big Noon Kickoff) | Fox | W 45–42 | 53,294 |
| September 9 | 10:00 a.m. | Nebraska* | No. 22 | Folsom Field; Boulder, CO (rivalry, Big Noon Kickoff) | Fox | W 36–14 | 53,241 |
| September 16 | 8:00 p.m. | Colorado State* | No. 18 | Folsom Field; Boulder, CO (Rocky Mountain Showdown, College GameDay, Big Noon Kickoff) | ESPN | W 43–35 ^{2OT} | 53,141 |
| September 23 | 1:30 p.m. | at No. 10 Oregon | No. 19 | Autzen Stadium; Eugene, OR | ABC | L 6–42 | 59,889 |
| September 30 | 10:00 a.m. | No. 8 USC | | Folsom Field; Boulder, CO (Big Noon Kickoff) | Fox | L 41–48 | 54,032 |
| October 7 | 4:30 p.m. | at Arizona State | | Mountain America Stadium; Tempe, AZ | P12N | W 27–24 | 54,086 |
| October 13 | 8:00 p.m. | Stanford | | Folsom Field; Boulder, CO | ESPN | L 43–46 ^{2OT} | 53,154 |
| October 28 | 5:30 p.m. | at No. 23 UCLA | | Rose Bowl; Pasadena, CA | ABC | L 16–28 | 71,343 |
| November 4 | 8:00 p.m. | No. 16 Oregon State^{†} | | Folsom Field; Boulder, CO | ESPN | L 19–26 | 52,725 |
| November 11 | 12:00 p.m. | No. 21 Arizona | | Folsom Field; Boulder, CO | P12N | L 31–34 | 52,788 |
| November 17 | 8:30 p.m. | at Washington State | | Martin Stadium; Pullman, WA | FS1 | L 14−56 | 27,869 |
| November 25 | 1:00 p.m. | at Utah | | Rice–Eccles Stadium; Salt Lake City, UT (Rumble in the Rockies) | P12N | L 17−23 | 51,595 |
*Non-conference game; ^{†}Homecoming; Rankings from AP Poll (and CFP Rankings, after October 31) - Released prior to game; All times are in Mountain time

== Rankings ==
Ranking movements Legend: ██ Increase in ranking ██ Decrease in ranking — = Not ranked RV = Received votes
| | Week | | | | | | | | | | | | | | | |
| Poll | Pre | 1 | 2 | 3 | 4 | 5 | 6 | 7 | 8 | 9 | 10 | 11 | 12 | 13 | 14 | Final |
|---|---|---|---|---|---|---|---|---|---|---|---|---|---|---|---|---|
| AP | — | 22 | 18 | 19 | RV | RV | — | — | — | — | — | — | — | — | — | — |
| Coaches | — | 25 | 21 | 19 | RV | — | — | — | — | — | — | — | — | — | — | — |
| CFP | Not released | | | | | | | | | — | — | — | — | — | — | Not released |

== Preseason ==
=== Spring game ===
The Colorado Buffaloes spring game was held on April 22, 2023 at Folsom Field. The 2023 spring game sold out for the first time since 1996 and was the highest attended spring game to date in program history with 47,277 in attendance. The game was televised nationally by ESPN and was the only spring game to air on the main network.

Colorado Black vs Gold

| Quarter | 1 | 2 | 3 | 4 | Total |
|---|---|---|---|---|---|
| Colorado Gold (Offense) | 17 | 8 | 14 | 0 | 39 |
| Colorado Black (Defense) | 8 | 3 | 8 | 8 | 27 |

at Folsom Field, Boulder, CO

- Date: April 22, 2023
- Game time: 1:00 p.m. MDT
- Game attendance: 47,277
- TV: ESPN

== Game summaries ==
=== at No. 17 TCU ===
Colorado Buffaloes (0–0) at No. 17 TCU Horned Frogs (0–0) – Game summary

| Quarter | 1 | 2 | 3 | 4 | Total |
|---|---|---|---|---|---|
| Buffaloes | 7 | 10 | 14 | 14 | 45 |
| No. 17 Horned Frogs | 0 | 14 | 14 | 14 | 42 |

at Amon G. Carter Stadium • Fort Worth, Texas

- Date: September 2, 2023
- Game time: 10:00 a.m. MDT
- Game weather: Sunny, 86 °F (30 °C)
- Game attendance: 53,294
- Referee: Kevin Mar
- TV announcers (Fox): Gus Johnson (play-by-play), Joel Klatt (analyst), and Jenny Taft (sideline reporter)

Game information

First quarter

- (08:58) COL – Dylan Edwards 4-yard pass from Shedeur Sanders, Alejandro Mata kick (Drive: 13 plays, 73 yards, 5:06; Colorado 7–0)

Second quarter

- (13:57) TCU – Trey Sanders 7-yard run, Griffin Kell kick (Drive: 7 plays, 52 yards, 02:17; Tied 7–7)
- (9:28) COL – Sy'veon Wilkerson 2-yard run, Jace Feely kick (Drive: 10 plays, 75 yards, 4:29; Colorado 14–7)
- (1:53) TCU – Trey Sanders 4-yard run, Griffin Kell kick (Drive: 4 plays, 22 yards, 1:05; Tied 14–14)
- (0:00) COL – Jace Feely 49-yard field goal (Drive: 9 plays, 44 yards, 1:53; Colorado 17–14)

Third quarter

- (14:24) COL – Dylan Edwards 75-yard pass from Shedeur Sanders, Griffin Kell kick (Drive: 1 play, 75 yards, 0:36; Colorado 24–14)
- (13:29) TCU – Jared Wiley 21-yard pass from Chandler Morris, Griffin Kell kick (Drive: 3 plays, 75 yards, 0:55; Colorado 24–21)
- (02:32) TCU – Dylan Wright 23-yard pass from Chandler Morris, Griffin Kell kick (Drive: 7 plays, 63 yards, 2:01; TCU 28–24)
- (0:27) COL – Dylan Edwards 7-yard run, Jace Feely kick (Drive: 5 plays, 75 yards, 2:05; Colorado 31–28)

Fourth quarter

- (10:49) TCU – Chandler Morris 19-yard run, Griffin Kell kick (Drive: 14 plays, 79 yards, 4:31; TCU 35–31)
- (7:36) COL – Jimmy Horn Jr. 26-yard pass from Shedeur Sanders, Jace Feely kick (Drive: 6 plays, 75 yards, 0:21; Colorado 38–35)
- (7:00) TCU – Trey Sanders 1-yard run, Griffin Kell kick (Drive: 2 plays, 8 yards, 3:13; TCU 42–38)
- (4:25) COL – Dylan Edwards 46-yard pass from Shedeur Sanders, Jace Feely kick (Drive: 6 plays, 82 yards, 2:28; Colorado 45–42)

| Statistics | COL | TCU |
|---|---|---|
| First downs | 30 | 27 |
| Total yards | 565 | 541 |
| Rushes/yards | 34–55 | 37–262 |
| Passing yards | 510 | 279 |
| Passing: Comp–Att–Int | 38–47–0 | 24–42–2 |
| Time of possession | 34:33 | 25:27 |

| Team | Category | Player | Statistics |
|---|---|---|---|
| Colorado | Passing | Shedeur Sanders | 38/47, 510 yards, 4 TD |
| Colorado | Rushing | Sy'veon Wilkerson | 13 carries, 45 yards, TD |
| Colorado | Receiving | Dylan Edwards | 5 receptions, 135 yards, 3 TD |
| TCU | Passing | Chandler Morris | 24/42, 279 yards, 2 TD, 2 INT |
| TCU | Rushing | Emani Bailey | 14 carries, 164 yards |
| TCU | Receiving | J. P. Richardson | 6 receptions, 63 yards |

=== vs Nebraska ===
Nebraska Cornhuskers (0–1) vs No. 22 Colorado Buffaloes (1–0) – Game summary

| Quarter | 1 | 2 | 3 | 4 | Total |
|---|---|---|---|---|---|
| Cornhuskers | 0 | 0 | 7 | 7 | 14 |
| No. 22 Buffaloes | 0 | 13 | 10 | 13 | 36 |

at Folsom Field • Boulder, CO

- Date: September 9, 2023
- Game time: 10:00 a.m. MDT
- Game weather: Sunny, 72 °F (22 °C)
- Game attendance: 53,241
- Referee: Kole Knueppel
- TV announcers (Fox): Gus Johnson (play-by-play), Joel Klatt (analyst), Jenny Taft (sideline)

Game information

First quarter

- None

Second quarter

- (4:20) COL – Jace Feely 31-yard field goal (Drive: 4 plays, 6 yards, 1:12; Colorado 3–0)
- (2:35) COL - Tar'Varish Dawson 30-yard pass from Shedeur Sanders, Jace Feely kick (Drive: 1 play, 30 yards, 0:08; Colorado 10–0)
- (0:00) COL – Jace Feely 32-yard field goal (Drive: 6 plays, 50 yards, 0:49; Colorado 13–0)

Third quarter

- (9:50) NEB – Jeff Sims 7-yard rush, Tristan Alvano kick (Drive: 4 plays, 66 yards, 2:10; Colorado 13–7)
- (6:49) COL – Xavier Weaver 12-yard pass from Shedeur Sanders, Jace Feely kick (Drive: 10 plays, 75 yards, 3:01; Colorado 20–7)
- (1:20) COL – Jace Feely 30-yard field goal (Drive: 8 plays, 55 yards, 3:45; Colorado 23–7)

Fourth quarter

- (10:45) COL – Tar'Varish Dawson 8-yard rush (Drive: 9 plays, 65 yards, 4:09; Colorado 29–7)
- (4:54) COL – Shedeur Sanders 6-yard rush, Jace Feely kick (Drive: 6 plays, 55 yards, 3:03; Colorado 36–7)
- (0:01) NEB – Thomas Fidone II 4-yard pass from Heinrich Haarberg, Tristan Alvano kick (Drive: 6 plays, 57 yards, 1:52; Colorado 36–14)

| Statistics | NEB | COL |
|---|---|---|
| First downs | 15 | 23 |
| Total yards | 341 | 454 |
| Rushes/yards | 41–222 | 33–58 |
| Passing yards | 119 | 396 |
| Passing: Comp–Att–Int | 11–22–1 | 32–44–0 |
| Time of possession | 29:41 | 31:19 |

| Team | Category | Player | Statistics |
|---|---|---|---|
| Nebraska | Passing | Jeff Sims | 9/15, 106 yards, INT |
| Nebraska | Rushing | Gabe Ervin Jr. | 17 carries, 74 yards |
| Nebraska | Receiving | Billy Kemp IV | 5 receptions, 57 yards |
| Colorado | Passing | Shedeur Sanders | 31/42, 393 yards, 2 TD |
| Colorado | Rushing | Dylan Edwards | 9 carries, 55 yards |
| Colorado | Receiving | Xavier Weaver | 10 receptions, 170 yards, TD |

=== vs Colorado State ===
Colorado State Rams (0–1) vs No. 18 Colorado Buffaloes (2–0) – Game summary

| Quarter | 1 | 2 | 3 | 4 | OT | 2OT | Total |
|---|---|---|---|---|---|---|---|
| Rams | 14 | 7 | 0 | 7 | 7 | 0 | 35 |
| No. 18 Buffaloes | 14 | 0 | 0 | 14 | 7 | 8 | 43 |

at Folsom Field • Boulder, CO

- Date: September 16, 2023
- Game time: 8:30 p.m. MDT
- Game weather: Clear, 63 °F (17 °C)
- Game attendance: 53,141
- Referee: Mike McCabe
- TV announcers (ESPN): Mark Jones (play-by-play), Louis Riddick (analyst), Quint Kessenich (sideline)

Game information

First quarter

- (8:09) COL – Shilo Sanders 80-yard interception return (Drive: 10 plays, 54 yards, 4:03; Colorado 7–0)
- (7:12) CSU – Dallin Holker 30-yard pass from Tory Horton, Jordan Noyes kick (Drive: 3 plays, 75 yards, 0:57; Tied 7–7)
- (6:16) CSU – Ron Hardge III 45-yard fumble return, Jordan Noyes kick (Drive: 3 plays, 20 yards, 0:56; Colorado State 14–7)
- (3:41) COL – Xavier Weaver 24-yard pass from Shedeur Sanders, Jace Feely kick (Drive: 7 plays, 71 yards, 2:35; Tied 14–14)

Second quarter

- (4:08) CSU – Louis Brown 15-yard pass from Brayden Fowler-Nicolosi, Jordan Noyes kick (Drive: 14 plays, 89 yards, 7:27; Colorado State 21–14)

Third quarter

- None

Fourth quarter

- (14:24) COL – Alejandro Mata 20-yard field goal (Drive: 10 plays, 43 yards, 3:31; Colorado State 21–17)
- (11:22) CSU – Dallin Holker 35-yard pass from Brayden Fowler-Nicolosi, Jordan Noyes kick (Drive: 7 plays, 76 yards, 3:02; Colorado State 28–17)
- (7:33) COL – Alejandro Mata 41-yard field goal (Drive: 11 plays, 52 yards, 3:49; Colorado State 28–20)
- (0:36) COL – Jimmy Horn Jr. 45-yard pass from Shedeur Sanders, Sheduer Sanders for two-point pass to Michael Harrison (Drive: 7 plays, 98 yards, 1:30; Tied 28–28)

First overtime

- (0:00) COL – Michael Harrison 3-yard pass from Shedeur Sanders, Jace Feely kick (Drive: 4 plays, 25 yards; Colorado 35–28)
- (0:00) CSU – Tory Horton 8-yard pass from Brayden Fowler-Nicolosi, Jordan Noyes kick (Drive: 4 plays, 25 yards; Tied 35–35)

Second overtime

- (0:00) COL – Michael Harrison 18-yard pass from Shedeur Sanders, Shedeur Sanders pass to Xavier Weaver (Drive: 3 plays, 25 yards; Colorado 43–35)

| Statistics | CSU | COL |
|---|---|---|
| First downs | 23 | 23 |
| Total yards | 499 | 418 |
| Rushes/yards | 39–102 | 25–70 |
| Passing yards | 397 | 348 |
| Passing: Comp–Att–Int | 35–48–3 | 38–47–1 |
| Time of possession | 34:37 | 25:23 |

| Team | Category | Player | Statistics |
|---|---|---|---|
| Colorado State | Passing | Brayden Fowler-Nicolosi | 34/47, 367 yards, 3 TD, 3 INT |
| Colorado State | Rushing | Kobe Johnson | 15 carries, 54 yards |
| Colorado State | Receiving | Tory Horton | 16 receptions, 133 yards, TD |
| Colorado | Passing | Shedeur Sanders | 38/47, 348 yards, 4 TD, INT |
| Colorado | Rushing | Dylan Edwards | 10 carries, 57 yards |
| Colorado | Receiving | Xavier Weaver | 9 receptions, 98 yards, TD |

=== at No. 10 Oregon ===
No. 19 Colorado Buffaloes (3–0) at No. 10 Oregon Ducks (3–0) – Game summary

| Quarter | 1 | 2 | 3 | 4 | Total |
|---|---|---|---|---|---|
| No. 19 Buffaloes | 0 | 0 | 0 | 6 | 6 |
| No. 10 Ducks | 13 | 22 | 7 | 0 | 42 |

at Autzen Stadium • Eugene, OR

- Date: September 23, 2023
- Game time: 1:30 p.m. MDT
- Game weather: Cloudy, 66 °F (19 °C)
- Game attendance: 59,889
- Referee: Matthew Richards
- TV announcers (ABC): Joe Tessitore (play-by-play), Jesse Palmer (analyst), Katie George (sideline)

Game information

First quarter

- (10:15) ORE – Noah Whittington 3-yard run, Camden Lewis kick (Drive: 10 plays, 72 yards, 04:45; Oregon 7–0)
- (2:41) ORE – Casey Kelly 1-yard pass from Bo Nix (Drive: 11 plays, 52 yards, 06:22; Oregon 13–0)

Second quarter

- (9:39) ORE – Troy Franklin 1-yard pass from Bo Nix, Bo Nix two-point pass to Troy Franklin (Drive: 13 plays, 89 yards, 05:41; Oregon 21–0)
- (2:52) ORE – Troy Franklin 36-yard pass from Bo Nix, Camden Lewis kick (Drive: 5 plays, 82 yards, 02:10; Oregon 28–0)
- (0:12) ORE – Bo Nix 11-yard run, Camden Lewis kick (Drive: 6 plays, 70 yards, 01:16; Oregon 35–0)

Third quarter

- (9:00) ORE – Jordan James 1-yard run, Camden Lewis kick (Drive: 8 plays, 76 yards, 03:08; Oregon 42–0)

Fourth quarter

- (2:51) COL – Michael Harrison 6-yard pass from Shedeur Sanders (Drive: 14 plays, 93 yards, 05:20; Oregon 42–6)

| Statistics | COL | ORE |
|---|---|---|
| First downs | 13 | 30 |
| Total yards | 199 | 522 |
| Rushes/yards | 25–40 | 38–240 |
| Passing yards | 159 | 282 |
| Passing: Comp–Att–Int | 23–33–0 | 30–35–1 |
| Time of possession | 24:54 | 35:06 |

| Team | Category | Player | Statistics |
|---|---|---|---|
| Colorado | Passing | Shedeur Sanders | 23/33, 159 yards, TD |
| Colorado | Rushing | Anthony Hankerson | 5 carries, 31 yards |
| Colorado | Receiving | Xavier Weaver | 9 receptions, 75 yards |
| Oregon | Passing | Bo Nix | 28/33, 279 yards, 3 TD, INT |
| Oregon | Rushing | Bucky Irving | 10 carries, 89 yards |
| Oregon | Receiving | Troy Franklin | 8 receptions, 126 yards, 2 TD |

=== vs No. 8 USC ===
No. 8 USC Trojans (4–0) vs Colorado Buffaloes (3–1) – Game summary

| Quarter | 1 | 2 | 3 | 4 | Total |
|---|---|---|---|---|---|
| No. 8 Trojans | 14 | 20 | 14 | 0 | 48 |
| Buffaloes | 0 | 14 | 13 | 14 | 41 |

at Folsom Field • Boulder, CO

- Date: September 30, 2023
- Game time: 10:00 a.m. MDT
- Game weather: Sunny, 67 °F (19 °C)
- Game attendance: 54,032
- Referee: Cravonne Barrett
- TV announcers (Fox): Gus Johnson (play-by-play), Joel Klatt (analyst), Jenny Taft (sideline)

Game information

First quarter

- (12:33) USC – MarShawn Lloyd 27-yard run, Denis Lynch kick (Drive: 6 plays, 75 yards, 02:27; USC 7–0)
- (2:30) USC – Tahj Washington 71-yard pass from Caleb Williams, Denis Lynch kick (Drive: 3 plays, 77 yards, 00:48; USC 14–0)

Second quarter

- (14:55) USC – Dorian Singer 8-yard pass from Caleb Williams, Denis Lynch kick (Drive: 4 plays, 22 yards, 01:19; USC 21–0)
- (12:59) COL – Jimmy Horn Jr. 30-yard pass from Shedeur Sanders, Alejandro Mata kick (Drive: 7 plays, 75 yards, 01:56; USC 21–7)
- (07:30) USC – Mario Williams 24-yard pass from Caleb Williams (Drive: 2 plays, 23 yards, 00:43; USC 27–7)
- (02:54) USC – Brenden Rice 26-yard pass from Caleb Williams, Denis Lynch kick (Drive: 7 plays, 73 yards, 02:28; USC 34–7)
- (00:21) COL – Shedeur Sanders 25-yard run, Alejandro Mata kick (Drive: 9 plays, 83 yards, 02:28; USC 34–14)

Third quarter

- (07:14) USC – Brenden Rice 6-yard pass from Caleb Williams, Denis Lynch kick (Drive: 7 plays, 55 yards, 02:51; USC 41–14)
- (05:50) COL – Anthony Hankerson 2-yard run, Alejandro Mata kick (Drive: 5 plays, 75 yards, 01:24; USC 41–21)
- (02:14) USC – Jude Wolfe 3-yard pass from Caleb Williams, Denis Lynch kick (Drive: 9 plays, 75 yards, 03:36; USC 48–21)
- (01:03) COL – Michael Harrison 21-yard pass from Shedeur Sanders (Drive: 5 plays, 75 yards, 01:11; USC 48–27)

Fourth quarter

- (11:55) COL – Omarion Miller 9-yard pass from Shedeur Sanders, Alejandro Mata kick (Drive: 11 plays, 61 yards, 03:58; USC 48–34)
- (01:43) COL – Jimmy Horn Jr. 16-yard pass from Shedeur Sanders, Alejandro Mata kick (Drive: 10 plays, 78 yards, 04:15; USC 48–41)

| Statistics | USC | COL |
|---|---|---|
| First downs | 26 | 32 |
| Total yards | 498 | 564 |
| Rushes/yards | 25–95 | 45–193 |
| Passing yards | 403 | 371 |
| Passing: Comp–Att–Int | 30–40–1 | 30–45–1 |
| Time of possession | 27:55 | 32:05 |

| Team | Category | Player | Statistics |
|---|---|---|---|
| USC | Passing | Caleb Williams | 30/40, 403 yards, 6 TD, INT |
| USC | Rushing | MarShawn Lloyd | 13 carries, 88 yards, TD |
| USC | Receiving | Tahj Washington | 8 receptions, 117 yards, TD |
| Colorado | Passing | Shedeur Sanders | 30/45, 371 yards, 4 TD, INT |
| Colorado | Rushing | Anthony Hankerson | 16 carries, 74 yards, TD |
| Colorado | Receiving | Omarion Miller | 7 receptions, 196 yards, TD |

=== at Arizona State ===
Colorado Buffaloes (3–2) at Arizona State Sun Devils (1–4) – Game summary

| Quarter | 1 | 2 | 3 | 4 | Total |
|---|---|---|---|---|---|
| Buffaloes | 7 | 7 | 0 | 13 | 27 |
| Sun Devils | 7 | 10 | 0 | 7 | 24 |

at Mountain America Stadium • Tempe, AZ

- Date: October 7, 2023
- Game time: 4:30 p.m. MDT
- Game weather: Sunny, 99 °F (37 °C)
- Game attendance: 54,086
- Referee: Chris Wiggins
- TV announcers (Pac-12 Network): Jordan Kent (play-by-play), Lincoln Kennedy (analyst)

Game information

First quarter

- (10:23) ASU – Trenton Bourguet 2-yard run, Dario Longhetto kick (Drive: 9 plays, 66 yards, 04:29; Arizona State 7–0)
- (02:03) COL – Xavier Weaver 1-yard run, Alejandro Mata kick (Drive: 16 plays, 75 yards, 05:58; Tied 7–7)

Second quarter

- (06:38) ASU – Cameron Skattebo 1-yard run, Dario Longhetto kick (Drive: 9 plays, 59 yards, 04:50; Arizona State 14–7)
- (00:54) COL – Shedeur Sanders 16-yard run, Alejandro Mata kick (Drive: 9 plays, 81 yards, 02:09; Tied 14–14)
- (00:00) ASU – Dario Longhetto 33-yard field goal (Drive: 7 plays, 48 yards, 00:50; Arizona State 17–14)

Third quarter

- None

Fourth quarter

- (14:32) COL – Javon Antonio 9-yard pass from Shedeur Sanders, Alejandro Mata kick (Drive: 7 plays, 61 yards, 01:35; Colorado 21–17)
- (10:13) COL – Alejandro Mata 42-yard field goal (Drive: 4 plays, 1 yard, 01:54; Colorado 24–17)
- (00:50) ASU – Troy Omeire pass from Trenton Bourguet (Drive: 13 plays, 94 yards, 02:36; Tied 24–24)
- (00:12) COL – Alejandro Mata 43-yard field goal (Drive: 5 plays, 50 yards, 00:38; Colorado 27–24)

| Statistics | COL | ASU |
|---|---|---|
| First downs | 19 | 25 |
| Total yards | 295 | 392 |
| Rushes/yards | 30–56 | 29–57 |
| Passing yards | 239 | 335 |
| Passing: Comp–Att–Int | 26–42–0 | 32–50–0 |
| Time of possession | 25:12 | 34:48 |

| Team | Category | Player | Statistics |
|---|---|---|---|
| Colorado | Passing | Shedeur Sanders | 26/42, 239 yards, TD |
| Colorado | Rushing | Anthony Hankerson | 10 carries, 58 yards |
| Colorado | Receiving | Javon Antonio | 5 receptions, 81 yards, TD |
| Arizona State | Passing | Trenton Bourguet | 32/49, 335 yards, TD |
| Arizona State | Rushing | Cameron Skattebo | 13 carries, 49 yards, TD |
| Arizona State | Receiving | Elijhah Badger | 12 receptions, 134 yards |

=== vs Stanford ===
Stanford Cardinal (1–4) vs Colorado Buffaloes (4–2) – Game summary

| Quarter | 1 | 2 | 3 | 4 | OT | 2OT | Total |
|---|---|---|---|---|---|---|---|
| Cardinal | 0 | 0 | 19 | 17 | 7 | 3 | 46 |
| Buffaloes | 14 | 15 | 0 | 7 | 7 | 0 | 43 |

at Folsom Field • Boulder, CO

- Date: October 13, 2023
- Game time: 8:00 p.m. MDT
- Game weather: Clear, 44 °F (7 °C)
- Game attendance: 53,154
- Referee: Justin Elliott
- TV announcers (ESPN): Mark Jones (play-by-play), Louis Riddick (analyst), Quint Kessenich (sideline)

Game information

First quarter

- (10:25) COL – Xavier Weaver 9-yard pass from Shedeur Sanders, Alejandro Mata kick (Drive: 8 plays, 77 yards, 3:03; Colorado 7–0)
- (3:36) COL – Travis Hunter 24-yard pass from Shedeur Sanders, Alejandro Mata kick (Drive: 9 plays, 85 yards, 3:13; Colorado 14–0)

Second quarter

- (8:42) COL – Xavier Weaver 39-yard pass from Shedeur Sanders, Caleb Fauria run for two-point conversion (Drive: 7 plays, 80 yards, 2:48; Colorado 22–0)
- (2:57) COL – Xavier Weaver 14-yard run, Alejandro Mata Kick (Drive: 5 plays, 66 yards, 1:47; Colorado 29–0)

Third quarter

- (9:01) STAN – Bryce Farrell 2-yard run, two-point conversion failed (Drive: 7 plays, 43 yards, 3:08; Colorado 29–6)
- (6:18) STAN – Elic Ayomanor 97-yard pass from Ashton Daniels, two-point conversion failed (Drive: 1 play, 97 yards, 0:15; Colorado 29–12)
- (4:45) STAN – Elic Ayomanor 60-yard pass from Ashton Daniels, Joshua Karty kick (Drive: 2 plays, 60 yards, 0:21; Colorado: 29–19)

Fourth quarter

- (12:29) STAN – Justin Lamson 1-yard run, Joshua Karty kick (Drive: 8 plays, 33 yards, 3:55; Colorado 29–26)
- (11:18) COL – Travis Hunter 16-yard pass from Shedeur Sanders, Alejandro Mata kick (Drive: 4 plays, 75 yards, 1:11; Colorado 36–26)
- (5:06) STAN – Bryce Farrell 3-yard pass from Ashton Daniels, Joshua Karty kick (Drive: 13 plays, 80 yards, 6:12; Colorado 36–33)
- (0:00) STAN – Joshua Karty 46-yard field goal (Drive: 14 plays, 71 yards, 2:55; Tied 36–36)

First overtime

- COL – Javon Antonio 4-yard pass from Shedeur Sanders, Alejandro Mata kick (Drive: 5 plays, 25 yards; Colorado: 43–36)
- STAN – Elic Ayomanor 30-yard pass from Ashton Daniels, Joshua Karty kick (Drive: 1 play, 25 yards; Tied 43–43)

Second overtime

- STAN – Joshua Karty 31-yard field goal (Drive: 4 plays, 12 yards; Stanford 46–43)

| Statistics | STAN | COL |
|---|---|---|
| First downs | 30 | 32 |
| Total yards | 523 | 532 |
| Rushes/yards | 39–124 | 35–132 |
| Passing yards | 399 | 400 |
| Passing: Comp–Att–Int | 28–49–0 | 33–47–1 |
| Time of possession | 34:42 | 25:18 |

| Team | Category | Player | Statistics |
|---|---|---|---|
| Stanford | Passing | Ashton Daniels | 27/45, 396 yards, 4 TD |
| Stanford | Rushing | Ashton Daniels | 16 carries, 39 yards |
| Stanford | Receiving | Elic Ayomanor | 13 receptions, 294 yards, 3 TD |
| Colorado | Passing | Shedeur Sanders | 33/47, 400 yards, 5 TD |
| Colorado | Rushing | Shedeur Sanders | 13 carries, 37 yards |
| Colorado | Receiving | Travis Hunter | 13 receptions, 140 yards, 2 TD |

=== at No. 23 UCLA ===
Colorado Buffaloes (4–3) at No. 23 UCLA Bruins (5–2) – Game summary

| Quarter | 1 | 2 | 3 | 4 | Total |
|---|---|---|---|---|---|
| Buffaloes | 6 | 0 | 3 | 7 | 16 |
| No. 23 Bruins | 0 | 7 | 7 | 14 | 28 |

at Rose Bowl • Pasadena, CA

- Date: October 28, 2023
- Game time: 5:30 p.m. MDT
- Game weather: Sunny, 70 °F (21 °C)
- Game attendance: 71,343
- Referee: Matthew Richards
- TV announcers (ABC): Chris Fowler (play-by-play), Kirk Herbstreit (analyst), Holly Rowe (sideline)

Game information

First quarter

- (10:40) COL – Alejandro Mata 31-yard field goal (Drive: 13 plays, 62 yards, 4:20; Colorado 3–0)
- (7:44) COL – Alejandro Mata 39-yard field goal (Drive: 7 plays, 15 yards, 1:44; Colorado 6–0)

Second quarter

- (14:19) UCLA – Carson Steele 3-yard pass from Ethan Garbers, R. J. Lopez kick (Drive: 9 plays, 45 yards, 4:36; UCLA 7–6)

Third quarter

- (14:25) UCLA – Moliki Matavao 26-yard pass from Ethan Garbers, R. J. Lopez kick (Drive: 2 plays, 75 yards, 0:35; UCLA 14–6)
- (4:13) COL – Alejandro Mata 34-yard field goal (Drive: 9 plays, 64 yards, 3:44; UCLA 14–9)

Fourth quarter

- (14:13) UCLA – T. J. Harden 3-yard run, R. J. Lopez kick (Drive: 13 plays, 80 yards, 4:50; UCLA 21–9)
- (6:34) UCLA – Collin Schlee 7-yard run, R. J. Lopez kick (Drive: 11 plays, 75 yards, 6:04; UCLA 28–9)
- (2:37) COL – Jimmy Horn Jr. 18-yard pass from Shedeur Sanders, Alejandro Mata kick (Drive: 9 plays, 86 yards, 3:53; UCLA 28–16)

| Statistics | COL | UCLA |
|---|---|---|
| First downs | 20 | 26 |
| Total yards | 242 | 487 |
| Rushes/yards | 24–25 | 45–218 |
| Passing yards | 217 | 269 |
| Passing: Comp–Att–Int | 27–43–0 | 20–28–2 |
| Time of possession | 26:46 | 33:14 |

| Team | Category | Player | Statistics |
|---|---|---|---|
| Colorado | Passing | Shedeur Sanders | 27/43, 217 yards, TD |
| Colorado | Rushing | Alton McCaskill | 2 carries, 14 yards |
| Colorado | Receiving | Xavier Weaver | 5 receptions, 86 yards |
| UCLA | Passing | Ethan Garbers | 20/27, 269 yards, 2 TD |
| UCLA | Rushing | T. J. Harden | 20 carries, 78 yards, TD |
| UCLA | Receiving | Logan Loya | 7 receptions, 111 yards |

=== vs No. 16 Oregon State ===
No. 16 Oregon State Beavers (6–2) vs Colorado Buffaloes (4–4) – Game summary

| Quarter | 1 | 2 | 3 | 4 | Total |
|---|---|---|---|---|---|
| No. 16 Beavers | 7 | 7 | 6 | 6 | 26 |
| Buffaloes | 0 | 3 | 2 | 14 | 19 |

at Folsom Field • Boulder, CO

- Date: November 4, 2023
- Game time: 8:00 p.m. MDT
- Game weather: Sunny, 52 °F (11 °C)
- Game attendance: 52,725
- Referee: Mike McCabe
- TV announcers (ESPN): Dave Flemming (play-by-play), Brock Osweiler (analyst), Kayla Burton (sideline)

Game information

First quarter

- (1:26) OSU – Aidan Chiles 23-yard run, Atticus Sappington kick (Drive: 9 plays, 71 yards, 4:49; Oregon State 7–0)

Second quarter

- (7:35) COL – Alejandro Mata 32-yard field goal (Drive: 4 plays, 5 yards, 1:24; Oregon State 7–3)
- (0:16) OSU – Deshaun Fenwick 20-yard pass from DJ Uiagalelei, (Drive: 1 plays, 20 yards, 0:06; Oregon State 14–3)

Third quarter

- (3:55) OSU – Deshaun Fenwick 1-yard run, Atticus Sappington kick, (Drive: 12 plays, 85 yards, 7:24; Oregon State 20–3)
- (3:55) COL – Kyndrich Breedlove defensive two-point conversion (Oregon State 20–5)

Fourth quarter

- (13:57) OSU – Atticus Sappington 32-yard field goal, (Drive: 8 plays, 66 yards, 4:02; Oregon State 23–5)
- (10:41) COL – Travis Hunter 15-yard pass from Shedeur Sanders, Alejandro Mata kick (Drive: 9 plays, 75 yards, 3:16; Oregon State 23–12)
- (4:47) OSU – Atticus Sappington 41-yard field goal (Drive: 11 plays, 52 yards, 5:54; Oregon State 26–12)
- (1:42) COL – Anthony Hankerson 12-yard pass from Shedeur Sanders, Alejandro Mata kick (Drive: 9 plays, 75 yards, 3:05; Oregon State 26–19)

| Statistics | OSU | COL |
|---|---|---|
| First downs | 25 | 15 |
| Total yards | 418 | 238 |
| Rushes/yards | 46–195 | 19–-7 |
| Passing yards | 223 | 245 |
| Passing: Comp–Att–Int | 12–25–0 | 24–39–0 |
| Time of possession | 35:58 | 24:02 |

| Team | Category | Player | Statistics |
|---|---|---|---|
| Oregon State | Passing | DJ Uiagalelei | 12/24, 223 yards, 1 TD |
| Oregon State | Rushing | Damien Martinez | 21 carries, 115 yards |
| Oregon State | Receiving | Jack Velling | 3 receptions, 69 yards |
| Colorado | Passing | Shedeur Sanders | 24/39, 245 yards, 2 TD |
| Colorado | Rushing | Sy'veon Wilkerson | 4 carries, 17 yards |
| Colorado | Receiving | Travis Hunter | 8 receptions, 98 yards, 1 TD |

=== vs No. 21 Arizona ===
Arizona Wildcats (6–3) vs Colorado Buffaloes (4–5) – Game summary

| Quarter | 1 | 2 | 3 | 4 | Total |
|---|---|---|---|---|---|
| No. 21 Wildcats | 7 | 10 | 7 | 10 | 34 |
| Buffaloes | 14 | 10 | 7 | 0 | 31 |

at Folsom Field • Boulder, CO

- Date: November 11, 2023
- Game time: 12:00 p.m. MST
- Game weather: Sunny, 57 °F (14 °C)
- Game attendance: 52,788
- Referee: Cravonne Barrett
- TV announcers (P12N): Ted Robinson (play-by-play), Yogi Roth (analyst)

Game information

First quarter

- (11:14) COL – Shedeur Sanders 16-yard run, Alejandro Mata kick (Drive: 3 plays, 36 yards, 1:16; Colorado 7–0)
- (8:26) ARIZ – D. J. Williams 11-yard run, Tyler Loop kick (Drive: 6 plays, 75 yards, 2:48; Tied 7–7)
- (0:14) COL – Jimmy Horn Jr. 20-yard pass from Shedeur Sanders, Alejandro Mata kick (Drive: 8 plays, 48 yards, 3:04; Colorado 14–7)

Second quarter

- (8:33) ARIZ – Jacob Cowing 3-yard pass from Noah Fifita, Tyler Loop kick (Drive: 5 plays, 72 yards, 2:23; Tied 14–14)
- (3:13) COL – Sy'veon Wilkerson 1-yard run, Alejandro Mata kick (Drive: 10 plays, 75 yards, 5:20; Colorado 21–14)
- (1:32) ARIZ – Tyler Loop 52-yard field goal (Drive: 6 plays, 25 yards, 1:31; Colorado 21–17)
- (0:00) COL – Alejandro Mata 39-yard field goal (Drive: 7 plays, 54 yards, 1:32; Colorado 24–17)

Third quarter

- (12:41) ARIZ – Tetairoa McMillan 2-yard pass from Noah Fifita, Tyler Loop kick (Drive: 5 plays, 75 yards, 2:19; Tied 24–24)
- (3:22) COL – Michael Harrison 7-yard pass from Shedeur Sanders, Alejandro Mata kick (Drive: 8 plays, 35 yards, 3:47; Colorado 31–24)

Fourth quarter

- (14:55) ARIZ – D. J. Williams 7-yard run, Tyler Loop kick (Drive: 6 plays, 75 yards, 0:05; Tied 31–31)
- (0:00) ARIZ – Tyler Loop 24-yard field goal (Drive: 11 plays, 67 yards, 4:57; Arizona 34–31)

| Statistics | ARIZ | COL |
|---|---|---|
| First downs | 22 | 18 |
| Total yards | 421 | 339 |
| Rushes/yards | 27–207 | 30–88 |
| Passing yards | 214 | 262 |
| Passing: Comp–Att–Int | 21–35–0 | 22–35–0 |
| Time of possession | 24:50 | 31:48 |

| Team | Category | Player | Statistics |
|---|---|---|---|
| Arizona | Passing | Noah Fifita | 21/35, 214 yards, 2 TD |
| Arizona | Rushing | Jonah Coleman | 11 carries, 179 yards |
| Arizona | Receiving | Tetairoa McMillan | 9 receptions, 107 yards, 1 TD |
| Colorado | Passing | Shedeur Sanders | 22/35, 262 yards, 2 TD |
| Colorado | Rushing | Shedeur Sanders | 13 carries, 29 yards, 1 TD |
| Colorado | Receiving | Xavier Weaver | 5 receptions, 84 yards |

=== at Washington State ===
Colorado Buffaloes (4–6) at Washington State Cougars (4–6) – Game summary

| Quarter | 1 | 2 | 3 | 4 | Total |
|---|---|---|---|---|---|
| Buffaloes | 7 | 0 | 0 | 7 | 14 |
| Cougars | 21 | 21 | 14 | 0 | 56 |

at Martin Stadium • Pullman, WA

- Date: November 17, 2023
- Game time: 8:30 p.m. MST
- Game weather: Sunny, 38 °F (3 °C)
- Game attendance: 27,869
- Referee: Chris Wiggins
- TV announcers (FS1): Tim Brando (play-by-play), Spencer Tillman (analyst)

Game information

First quarter

- (8:57) WSU – Lincoln Victor 15-yard run, Dean Janikowski kick (Drive: 7 plays, 65 yards, 4:15; Washington State 7–0)
- (5:14) WSU – Brennan Jackson 40-yard fumble return, Dean Janikowski kick (Drive: 7 plays, 17 yards, 3:38; Washington State 7–0)
- (0:56) COL – Travis Hunter pass from Shedeur Sanders, Alejandro Mata kick (Drive: 3 plays, 49 yards, 0:36; Washington State 14–7)
- (0:43) WSU – Leyton Smithson 98-yard kickoff return, Dean Janikowski kick (Drive: 3 plays, 8 yards, 0:50; Washington State 21–7)

Second quarter

- (12:08) WSU – Nakia Watson 3-yard pass from Cam Ward, Dean Janikowski kick (Drive: 8 plays, 67 yards, 2:45; Washington State 28–7)
- (3:48) WSU – Cameron Ward 1-yard run, Dean Janikowski kick (Drive: 10 plays, 97 yards, 4:12; Washington State 35–7)
- (0:57) WSU – Cameron Ward 2-yard run, Dean Janikowski kick (Drive: 5 plays, 73 yards, 1:41; Washington State 42–7)

Third quarter

- (6:10) WSU – Kyle Williams 34-yard pass from Cameron Ward, Dean Janikowski kick (Drive: 5 plays, 66 yards, 2:05; Washington State 49–7)
- (6:10) WSU – Chris Jackson fumble return, Dean Janikowski kick (Drive: 2 plays, 17 yards, 0:37; Washington State 56–7)

Fourth quarter

- (11:48) COL – Sy'veon Wilkerson 1-yard run, Alejandro Mata kick (Drive: 11 plays, 80 yards, 4:05; Washington State 56–14)

| Statistics | COL | WSU |
|---|---|---|
| First downs | 15 | 23 |
| Total yards | 255 | 469 |
| Rushes/yards | 41–91 | 32–127 |
| Passing yards | 164 | 342 |
| Passing: Comp–Att–Int | 12–27–1 | 20–33–0 |
| Time of possession | 29:25 | 30:35 |

| Team | Category | Player | Statistics |
|---|---|---|---|
| Colorado | Passing | Shedeur Sanders | 6/10, 86 yards, 1 TD |
| Colorado | Rushing | Sy'veon Wilkerson | 13 carries, 49 yards, 1 TD |
| Colorado | Receiving | Travis Hunter | 4 receptions, 82 yards, 1 TD |
| Washington State | Passing | Cam Ward | 18/30, 288 yards, 2 TD |
| Washington State | Rushing | Nakia Watson | 8 carries, 47 yards |
| Washington State | Receiving | Josh Kelly | 6 receptions, 130 yards |

=== at Utah ===
Colorado Buffaloes (4–7) at Utah Utes (7–4) – Game summary

| Quarter | 1 | 2 | 3 | 4 | Total |
|---|---|---|---|---|---|
| Buffaloes | 0 | 10 | 0 | 7 | 17 |
| Utes | 7 | 3 | 7 | 3 | 20 |

at Rice-Eccles Stadium • Salt Lake City, UT

- Date: November 25, 2023
- Game time: 1:00 p.m. MST
- Game weather: Cloudy, 35 °F (2 °C)
- Game attendance: 51,595
- Referee: Justin Elliott
- TV announcers (Pac-12 Network): Roxy Bernstein (play-by-play), Lincoln Kennedy (analyst)

Game information

First quarter

- (4:03) UTAH – Luke Bottari 2-yard run, Cole Becker kick (Drive: 8 plays, 58 yards, 5:10; Utah 7–0)

Second quarter

- (11:17) UTAH – Cole Becker 34-yard field goal (Drive: 9 plays, 60 yards, 4:46; Utah 10–0)
- (8:17) COL – Dylan Edwards pass from Jimmy Horn Jr., Alejandro Mata kick (Drive: 5 plays, 59 yards, 2:50; Utah 10–7)
- (1:38) UTAH – Cole Becker 22-yard field goal (Drive: 11 plays, 61 yards, 6:39; Utah 13–7)
- (0:20) COL – Alejandro Mata 47-yard field goal (Drive: 8 plays, 52 yards, 1:12; Utah 13–10)

Third quarter

- (7:10) UTAH – Luke Bottari 1-yard run, Cole Becker kick (Drive: 8 plays, 62 yards, 4:27; Utah 20–10)

Fourth quarter

- (11:31) UTAH – Cole Becker 31-yard field goal (Drive: 14 plays, 56 yards, 8:25; Utah 23–10)
- (7:31) COL – Travis Hunter 18-yard pass from Ryan Staub, Alejandro Mata kick (Drive: 8 plays, 84 yards, 3:52; Utah 23–17)

| Statistics | COL | UTAH |
|---|---|---|
| First downs | 13 | 22 |
| Total yards | 262 | 329 |
| Rushes/yards | 17–37 | 53–268 |
| Passing yards | 225 | 61 |
| Passing: Comp–Att–Int | 18–25–0 | 6–10–0 |
| Time of possession | 20:56 | 39:04 |

| Team | Category | Player | Statistics |
|---|---|---|---|
| Colorado | Passing | Ryan Staub | 17/24, 195 yards, 1 TD |
| Colorado | Rushing | Sy'veon Wilkerson | 7 carries, 32 yards |
| Colorado | Receiving | Travis Hunter | 8 receptions, 107 yards, 1 TD |
| Utah | Passing | Luke Bottari | 6/10, 61 yards |
| Utah | Rushing | Jaylon Glover | 17 carries, 107 yards |
| Utah | Receiving | Mikey Matthews | 2 receptions, 19 yards |

== Personnel ==
=== Roster ===
2023 Colorado Buffaloes football team roster
Players
Coaches
Offense

| Pos. | # | Name | Class |
|---|---|---|---|
| QB | 2 | Shedeur Sanders | Jr |
| RB | 3 | Dylan Edwards | Fr |
| WR | 4 | Javon Antonio | GS |
| WR | 5 | Jimmy Horn Jr. | Jr |
| WR | 6 | Tar'Varish Dawson | So |
| WR | 7 | Jaylen Ellis | Jr |
| RB | 8 | Kavosiey Smoke | GS |
| RB | 9 | Anthony Hankerson | So |
| WR | 10 | Xavier Weaver | GS |
| WR | 13 | Kaleb Mathis | Fr |
| QB | 14 | Colton Allen | Fr |
| WR | 14 | Omarion Miller | Fr |
| QB | 15 | Kasen Weisman | Fr |
| QB | 16 | Ryan Staub | Fr |
| WR | 17 | Isaiah Hardge | Fr |
| WR | 18 | Adam Hopkins | Fr |
| WR | 20 | Willie Gaines | Jr |
| RB | 22 | Alton McCaskill | So |
| QB | 23 | Gavin Kuld | Jr |
| WR | 28 | Asaad Waseem | Fr |
| WR | 34 | Dante Capolungo | Fr |
| TE | 35 | Antonio Posadas | Fr |
| RB | 36 | Sy'veon Wilkerson | So |
| RB | 44 | Charlie Offerdahl | So |
| RB | 45 | Ahmir McGee | Jr |
| WR | 47 | Gavin Marsh | Fr |
| RB | 48 | Christian Sarem | Fr |
| G | 50 | Jack Wilty | So |
| OT | 51 | Isaiah Jatta | Jr |
| G | 52 | Owen Westemeyer | Fr |
| C | 55 | Van Wells | So |
| G | 56 | Tyler Brown | Jr |
| OT | 57 | David Conner | Fr |
| C | 58 | Hank Zilinskas | Fr |
| OT | 60 | Carter Edwards | Fr |
| OT | 64 | Evan Kistler | Sr |
| G | 65 | Jack Bailey | GS |
| OT | 66 | Jeremiah McCrimmon | Jr |
| OT | 69 | Gerad Christian-Lichtenhan | Jr |
| G | 70 | Reggie Young | GS |
| OT | 72 | Ben Reznik | So |
| G | 73 | Landon Bebee | GS |
| OT | 76 | Jack Seavall | So |
| OT | 77 | Kareem Harden | So |
| OT | 78 | Savion Washington | GS |
| WR | 80 | Jordan Onovughe | Fr |
| WR | 81 | Chernet Estes | Fr |
| WR | 82 | Kendal Stewart | Fr |
| TE | 83 | Elijah Yelverton | So |
| WR | 84 | Cole Boscia | Fr |
| WR | 85 | Jacob Page | Fr |
| TE | 86 | Brady Kopetz | Fr |
| TE | 87 | Michael Harrison | Jr |
| TE | 88 | Caleb Fauria | So |
| TE | 89 | Louis Passarello | So |

Defense

| Pos. | # | Name | Class |
|---|---|---|---|
| CB | 1 | Cormani McClain | Fr |
| CB | 3 | Omarion Cooper | Jr |
| CB | 4 | Travis Jay | Jr |
| S | 7 | Cam'Ron Silmon-Craig | Jr |
| S | 8 | Jahquez Robinson | GS |
| OLB | 9 | Derrick McLendon | GS |
| CB | 10 | Kyndrich Breedlove | So |
| CB/WR | 12 | Travis Hunter | So |
| DE | 13 | Sav'ell Smalls | Jr |
| S | 18 | Myles Slusher | Jr |
| ILB | 20 | LaVonta Bentley | GS |
| S | 21 | Shilo Sanders | GS |
| ILB | 22 | Demouy Kennedy | Jr |
| CB | 23 | Carter Stoutmire | Fr |
| ILB | 25 | Marvin Ham II | Jr |
| S | 26 | Vito Tisdale | So |
| CB | 27 | Nahmier Robinson | Fr |
| S | 28 | Ben Finneseth | So |
| S | 29 | Rodrick Ward | GS |
| CB | 30 | Braden Keith | Fr |
| S | 31 | Jaden Milliner-Jones | Fr |
| ILB | 32 | Kofi Taylor-Barrocks | Fr |
| OLB | 33 | Devee Harris | GS |
| S | 35 | Brandon Miller | Fr |
| ILB | 37 | Morgan Pearson | Fr |
| OLB | 38 | Brendan Gant | GS |
| S | 39 | Austin Dahlke | So |
| OLB | 40 | Taje McCoy | Fr |
| OLB | 41 | Khairi Manns | Jr |
| ILB | 42 | Jeremiah Brown | Jr |
| S | 43 | Trevor Woods | Jr |
| OLB | 44 | Jordan Domineck | GS |
| CB | 45 | Andi Etok | Fr |
| CB | 46 | Isreal Solomon | Fr |
| DE | 49 | Taijh Alston | GS |
| DE | 50 | J. J. Hawkins | So |
| ILB | 51 | Juwan Mitchell | GS |
| DL | 52 | Chazz Wallace | Jr |
| DE | 53 | Arden Walker | So |
| ILB | 54 | Bo Simmons-Lapena | Fr |
| DL | 55 | Leonard Payne Jr. | GS |
| ILB | 57 | Victory Johnson | Fr |
| ILB | 58 | Noah Young | GS |
| OLB | 59 | Tristan Marois | Jr |
| DL | 88 | Amari McNeill | So |
| OLB | 93 | Joshka Gustav | Jr |
| DL | 95 | Bishop Thomas | Fr |
| OLB | 98 | Jacob Woida | Fr |
| DL | 99 | Shane Coakes | GS |

Special teams

| Pos. | # | Name | Class |
|---|---|---|---|
| P | 15 | Mark Vassett | Jr |
| K | 16 | Alejandro Mata | So |
| K | 17 | Jace Feely | So |
| LS | 38 | Jacob Politte | So |
| LS | 47 | Cameron Warchuk | So |
| P | 49 | Trent Carrizosa | So |
| LS | 79 | Camden Dempsey | So |
| LS | 96 | Gabe Landers | Fr |
| K | 98 | Cristiano Palazzo | So |

Head coach

- Deion Sanders

Coordinators/assistant coaches

- Gary Harrell – Assistant head coach/Running backs
- Charles Kelly – Defensive coordinator/Safeties
- Sean Lewis – Offensive coordinator/Quarterbacks
- Brett Bartolone – Wide receivers
- Tim Brewster – Tight ends
- Andre' Hart – Linebackers
- Kevin Mathis – Cornerbacks
- Bill O'Boyle – Offensive linemen
- Sal Sunseri – Defensive tackles
- Nick Williams – Defensive ends
- Maurice Sims – Director, sports performance
- Pat Shurmur – Quality control, offense
- Rashad Davis – Quality control, offense
- Michael Pollock – Quality control, offense
- Gunnar White – Quality control, offense
- Dennis Thurman – Quality control, defense
- Anthony Balancier – Quality control, defense
- Vincent Dancy – Quality control, defense
- Trevor Reilly – Quality control, special teams
- Nate Dodson – Graduate assistant
- Cordale Grundy – Graduate assistant
- Josh Jynes – Graduate assistant
- Andrew Zimmer – Graduate assistant'

Legend

- (C) Team captain
- (S) Suspended
- (I) Ineligible
- Injured
- Redshirt

Roster
Last update: 9/25/23

=== Depth chart ===
Defense

FS
Shilo Sanders
Rodrick Ward
⋅

| Nickel | ILB | ILB | OLB |
|---|---|---|---|
| Myles Slusher | Marvin Ham | LaVonta Bentley | Khairi Manns |
| Jaden Milliner-Jones | Jeremiah Brown | Demouy Kennedy | Arden Walker |
| ⋅ | ⋅ | ⋅ | ⋅ |

SS
Trevor Woods
Cam'Ron Silmon-Craig
⋅

CB
Travis Hunter
Carter Stoutmire
⋅

| DE | NT | DE |
|---|---|---|
| Derrick McClendon | Shane Cokes | Leonard Payne |
| Taijh Alston | Bishop Thomas | J.J. Hawkins |
| ⋅ | ⋅ | ⋅ |

CB
Omarion Cooper
Kendrick Breedlove
⋅

Offense

WR
Travis Hunter
Javon Antonio
⋅

WR
Jimmy Horn Jr.
Tar'Varish Dawson
⋅

| LT | LG | C | RG | RT |
|---|---|---|---|---|
| Gerad Christian-Lichtenhan | Jack Bailey | Van Wells | Landon Bebee | Savion Washington |
| Isaiah Jatta | Jack Wilty | Landon Bebee | Kareem Harden | Reggie Young |
| ⋅ | ⋅ | ⋅ | ⋅ | ⋅ |

TE
Michael Harrison
Elijah Yelverton
Caleb Fauria

WR
Xavier Weaver
Cole Boscia
⋅

QB
Shedeur Sanders
Ryan Staub
⋅

RB
Dylan Edwards
Alton McCaskill
Anthony Hankerson

Special teams
PK Jace Feely
P Mark Vassett
KR Dylan Edwards
Xavier Weaver
PR Jimmy Horn Jr.
LS Cameron Warchuck

=== Recruiting class ===
College recruiting (2023)
| Name | Hometown | School | Height | Weight | Commit date |
|---|---|---|---|---|---|
| Cormani McClain; CB | Lakeland, FL | Lakeland High School | 6 ft 2 in (1.88 m) | 165 lb (75 kg) | Jan 19, 2023 |
| Cormani McClain; CB | Recruit ratings: Rivals: 247Sports: ESPN: (92) | | | | |
| Adam Hopkins; WR | Thomasville, GA | Thomas County Central High School | 5 ft 11 in (1.80 m) | 175 lb (79 kg) | Dec 21, 2022 |
| Adam Hopkins; WR | Recruit ratings: Rivals: 247Sports: ESPN: (86) | | | | |
| Dylan Edwards; RB | Derby, KS | Derby Senior High School | 5 ft 8 in (1.73 m) | 155 lb (70 kg) | Dec 10, 2022 |
| Dylan Edwards; RB | Recruit ratings: Rivals: 247Sports: ESPN: (83) | | | | |
| Omarion Miller; WR | Vivian, LA | North Caddo High School | 6 ft 3 in (1.91 m) | 185 lb (84 kg) | Dec 24, 2022 |
| Omarion Miller; WR | Recruit ratings: Rivals: 247Sports: ESPN: (80) | | | | |
| Isaiah Jatta; OT | San Diego, CA | Snow College | 6 ft 5 in (1.96 m) | 310 lb (140 kg) | Dec 21, 2022 |
| Isaiah Jatta; OT | Recruit ratings: Rivals: 247Sports: ESPN: (79) | | | | |
| Morgan Pearson; LB | Ardmore, OK | Plainview High School | 6 ft 1 in (1.85 m) | 220 lb (100 kg) | Nov 28, 2022 |
| Morgan Pearson; LB | Recruit ratings: Rivals: 247Sports: ESPN: (79) | | | | |
| Taje McCoy; DE | Warr Acres, OK | Putnam City High School | 6 ft 3 in (1.91 m) | 240 lb (110 kg) | Dec 12, 2022 |
| Taje McCoy; DE | Recruit ratings: Rivals: 247Sports: ESPN: (79) | | | | |
| Jacob Page; WR | Nashville, TN | The Ensworth School | 6 ft 2 in (1.88 m) | 180 lb (82 kg) | Dec 19, 2022 |
| Jacob Page; WR | Recruit ratings: Rivals: 247Sports: ESPN: (78) | | | | |
| Ryan Staub; QB | Valencia, CA | West Ranch High School | 6 ft 0 in (1.83 m) | 195 lb (88 kg) | Jan 31, 2022 |
| Ryan Staub; QB | Recruit ratings: Rivals: 247Sports: ESPN: (78) | | | | |
| Kofi Taylor-Barrocks; LB | London | NFL Academy | 6 ft 3 in (1.91 m) | 225 lb (102 kg) | Dec 18, 2022 |
| Kofi Taylor-Barrocks; LB | Recruit ratings: Rivals: 247Sports: ESPN: (78) | | | | |
| Carter Stoutmire; CB | Plano, TX | Prestonwood Christian Academy | 6 ft 0 in (1.83 m) | 185 lb (84 kg) | Dec 20, 2022 |
| Carter Stoutmire; CB | Recruit ratings: Rivals: 247Sports: ESPN: (77) | | | | |
| Isaiah Hardge; WR | Fort Lauderdale, FL | Saint Thomas Aquinas High | 5 ft 10 in (1.78 m) | 160 lb (73 kg) | Apr 20, 2022 |
| Isaiah Hardge; WR | Recruit ratings: Rivals: 247Sports: ESPN: (76) | | | | |
| Asaad Waseem; WR | Winter Garden, FL | West Orange High School | 5 ft 11 in (1.80 m) | 170 lb (77 kg) | Dec 10, 2022 |
| Asaad Waseem; WR | Recruit ratings: Rivals: 247Sports: ESPN: (76) | | | | |
| Jordan Onovughe; WR | Santa Ana, CA | Mater Dei High School | 6 ft 2 in (1.88 m) | 190 lb (86 kg) | Nov 7, 2022 |
| Jordan Onovughe; WR | Recruit ratings: Rivals: 247Sports: ESPN: (76) | | | | |
| Victory Johnson; LB | San Diego, CA | Cathedral Catholic High School | 6 ft 4 in (1.93 m) | 230 lb (100 kg) | Nov 5, 2022 |
| Victory Johnson; LB | Recruit ratings: Rivals: 247Sports: ESPN: (75) | | | | |
| Kasen Weisman; QB | Douglasville, GA | South Paulding High School | 6 ft 2 in (1.88 m) | 180 lb (82 kg) | Dec 25, 2022 |
| Kasen Weisman; QB | Recruit ratings: Rivals: 247Sports: ESPN: (75) | | | | |
| Jaden Milliner-Jones; S | DeSoto, TX | DeSoto High School | 5 ft 11 in (1.80 m) | 190 lb (86 kg) | Dec 21, 2022 |
| Jaden Milliner-Jones; S | Recruit ratings: Rivals: 247Sports: ESPN: (75) | | | | |
| Jack Wilty; OL | Des Moines, IA | Iowa Central Community College | 6 ft 4 in (1.93 m) | 305 lb (138 kg) | Dec 21, 2022 |
| Jack Wilty; OL | Recruit ratings: Rivals: 247Sports: ESPN: (74) | | | | |
| Hank Zilinskas; OL | Englewood, CO | Cherry Creek High School | 6 ft 3 in (1.91 m) | 275 lb (125 kg) | Jul 21, 2022 |
| Hank Zilinskas; OL | Recruit ratings: Rivals: 247Sports: ESPN: (73) | | | | |
Overall recruit ranking: Rivals: #25 247Sports: #29
Note: In many cases, Scout, Rivals, 247Sports, On3, and ESPN may conflict in their listings of height and weight.; In these cases, the average was taken. ESPN grades are on a 100-point scale.; Sources: "Rivals commits". Rivals.; "ESPN commits". ESPN.; "2023 Team Ranking". Rivals.com.; "247Sports commits". 247Sports.

=== Transfers ===
==== Outgoing ====
| Player | Position | New school |
|---|---|---|
| Maurice Bell | WR | Withdrew |
| Isaiah Lewis | S | Withdrew |
| Montana Lemonious-Craig | WR | Arizona |
| Taylor Upshaw | DE | Arizona |
| Jordyn Tyson | WR | Arizona State |
| J. T. Shrout | QB | Arkansas State |
| Xavier Smith | S | Austin Peay |
| Ty Robinson | WR | Ball State |
| Chase Penry | WR | Boise State |
| Deion Smith | RB | BYU |
| Kaylin Moore | CB | California |
| Jack Hestera | WR | Charlotte |
| Austin Johnson | OL | Charlotte |
| Zach Courtney | TE | Coastal Carolina |
| Chase Sowell | WR | East Carolina |
| Casey Roddick | OL | Florida State |
| Shakaun Bowser | LB | Garden City |
| Oakie Salave'a | DL | Hawaii |
| Aubrey Smith | LB | Houston |
| Devin Grant | DL | Incarnate Word |
| Mister Williams | ILB | Incarnate Word |
| Luke Eckardt | OL | Iowa Western Community College |
| Tyas Martin | DL | Jackson State |
| Mason Maddox | DL | Kent State |
| Joshua Wiggins | CB | Liberty |
| Victor Venn | RB | Liberty |
| Austin Smith | TE | Memphis |
| Tyrin Taylor | S | Memphis |
| Maddox Kopp | QB | Miami (OH) |
| Jalen Sami | DL | Michigan State |
| Seydou Traore | TE | Mississippi State |
| Dylan Dixson | S | Missouri State |
| Yousef Mugharbil | OT | NC State |
| Brendon Lewis | QB | Nevada |
| Travis Gray | OT | New Mexico |
| Edgar Amaya | OL | North Alabama |
| Zion Magalei | LB | Northern Arizona |
| Ashton Logan | P | Oklahoma |
| Jeremy Mack Jr. | S | Old Dominion |
| Kaden Ludwick | TE | Oregon |
| Nikko Reed | CB | Oregon |
| Jason Oliver | CB | Sacramento State |
| Tayvion Beasley | CB | San Diego State |
| Keyshon Mills | CB | SMU |
| Noah Fenske | OL | Southern Illinois |
| Aaron Austin | DL | Stephen F. Austin |
| Alex Harkey | OL | Texas State |
| Chance Main | EDGE | Texas State |
| Janaz Jordan | DL | Towson |
| Drew Carter | QB | UC Davis (basketball) |
| Jake Wiley | OL | UCLA |
| Cole Becker | K | Utah |
| Grant Page | WR | Utah State |
| Simeon Harris | CB | Utah State |
| Jackson Anderson | OL | UTSA |
| Owen McCown | QB | UTSA |
| Allen Baugh | DL | Valdosta State |
| James Mott | QB | Villanova |
| Na'im Rodman | DL | Washington State |
| Ryan Willams | DL | Western Kentucky |
| Nigel Bethel Jr. | CB | TBD |
| Eoghan Kerry | OLB | TBD |
| Jayle Stacks | RB | TBD |
| Alvin Williams | EDGE | TBD |
| Jordan Woolverton | S | TBD |

==== Incoming ====
| Player | Position | Previous school |
|---|---|---|
| Demouy Kennedy | LB | Alabama |
| Jahquez Robinson | DB | Alabama |
| Jace Feely | K | Arizona State |
| Juwan Mitchell | LB | Arizona State |
| Jordan Domineck | DL | Arkansas |
| Myles Slusher | S | Arkansas |
| Tar'Varish Dawson | WR | Auburn |
| Jaylen Ellis | WR | Baylor |
| Kareem Harden | OL | Butler Community College |
| Champion Johnson | RB | California |
| LaVonta Bentley | LB | Clemson |
| Shane Cokes | DL | Dartmouth |
| David Conner | OL | Florida |
| Omarion Cooper | CB | Florida State |
| Brendan Gant | LB | Florida State |
| Derrick McLendon II | DE | Florida State |
| Bishop Thomas | DL | Florida State |
| Travis Jay | CB | Florida State |
| Leonard Payne | DL | Fresno State |
| Alton McCaskill | RB | Houston |
| Jeremiah Brown | LB | Jackson State |
| Tyler Brown | OL | Jackson State |
| Willie Gaines | WR | Jackson State |
| Travis Hunter | CB/WR | Jackson State |
| Alejandro Mata | K | Jackson State |
| Jacob Politte | LS | Jackson State |
| Shedeur Sanders | QB | Jackson State |
| Shilo Sanders | S | Jackson State |
| Cam'Ron Silmon-Craig | S | Jackson State |
| Sy'veon Wilkerson | RB | Jackson State |
| Jack Bailey | OT | Kent State |
| Savion Washington | OT | Kent State |
| Kavosiey Smoke | RB | Kentucky |
| Vito Tisdale | S | Kentucky |
| Reggie Young | OL | Liberty |
| Mark Vassett | P | Louisville |
| Khairi Manns | DE | Maine |
| Arden Walker | DE | Missouri |
| Landon Bebee | OL | Missouri State |
| Gavin Kuld | QB | Northeastern Oklahoma A&M |
| Javon Antonio | WR | Northwestern State |
| D'Vion Harris | DE | Old Dominion |
| Chazz Wallace | DT | Old Dominion |
| Kyndrich Breedlove | CB | Ole Miss |
| J. J. Hawkins | DE | Ole Miss |
| Rodrick Ward | S | Southern Utah |
| Amari McNeill | DT | Tennessee |
| Jimmy Horn Jr. | WR | USF |
| Xavier Weaver | WR | USF |
| Sav'ell Smalls | DE | Washington |
| Jaylen Ellis | WR | West Virginia |
| Taijh Alston | DE | West Virginia |
| Marshawn Kneeland | DE | Western Michigan |
