= Ryan Staub =

American football player

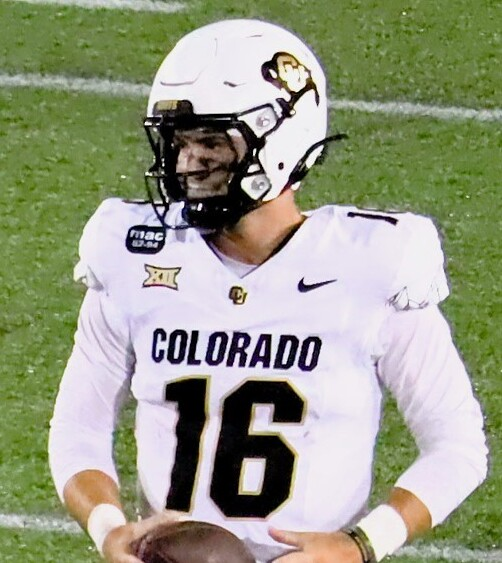
- Staub with Colorado in 2025

No. 8 – Tennessee Volunteers
- Position: Quarterback
- Class: Redshirt Junior

Personal information
- Listed height: 6 ft 1 in (1.85 m)
- Listed weight: 205 lb (93 kg)

Career information
- High school: West Ranch (Stevenson Ranch, California)
- College: Colorado (2023–2025); Tennessee (2026–present)
- Stats at ESPN

Ryan Staub is an American college football quarterback for the Tennessee Volunteers. He previously played for the Colorado Buffaloes.

== Early life ==
Staub attended West Ranch High School in Stevenson Ranch, California. As a senior, he threw for 3,008 yards and 37 touchdowns. Following his high school career, Staub committed to play college football at the University of Colorado Boulder.

== College career ==
Staub redshirted in 2023, serving as the back up to Shedeur Sanders. Following an injury to Sanders, he made his first career start in the final game of the season against Utah, completing 17 passes for 195 yards and a touchdown in a 23–17 defeat. He returned in 2024, remaining as the backup to Sanders. Staub entered the 2025 season as the third-string quarterback behind Kaidon Salter and Julian Lewis. Against Delaware, he threw for 157 yards and two touchdowns in a 31–7 victory. Following his performance, Staub was named Colorado's starting quarterback against Houston. In the game, he completed 19 passes for 204 yards, a touchdown, and two interceptions, as the Buffaloes lost 36–20. Staub finished the 2025 season throwing for 427 yards, three touchdowns, and four interceptions in five games. He entered the transfer portal at the conclusion of the year.

On January 18, 2026, Staub announced his decision to transfer to the University of Tennessee to play for the Tennessee Volunteers.

=== Statistics ===
Season	Team	Games			Passing								Rushing			
Season	Team	GP	GS	Record	Comp	Att	Pct	Yards	Avg	TD	Int	Rate	Att	Yards	Avg	TD
2023	Colorado	3	1	0–1	23	40	57.5	254	6.4	1	0	119.1	11	-26	-2.4	0
2024	Colorado	4	0	0–0	0	4	0.0	0	0.0	0	0	0.0	3	4	1.3	0
2025	Colorado	5	1	0–1	30	55	54.5	427	7.8	3	4	123.2	19	30	1.6	1
Career		12	2	0–2	53	99	53.5	681	6.9	4	4	116.6	33	8	0.2	1
