= Michael Harrison (American football) =

American football tight end (born 2001)

No. 87 – San Diego State Aztecs
- Position: Tight end
- Class: Junior

Personal information
- Born: October 19, 2001 (age 25); San Francisco, California, U.S.
- Listed height: 6 ft 3 in (1.91 m)
- Listed weight: 215 lb (98 kg)

Career information
- High school: St. Ignatius College Preparatory (San Francisco, California)
- College: Colorado (2020–2023); San Diego State (2024–present)
- Stats at ESPN

Michael Harrison (born October 19, 2001) is an American college football tight end for the San Diego State Aztecs. He previously played for the Colorado Buffaloes.

== Early life ==
Harrison grew up in San Francisco and attended St. Ignatius College Preparatory where he lettered in football, track & field, soccer and baseball. He was an unranked tight end recruit and committed to play college football at Colorado as a walk-on wide receiver.

== College career ==
=== Colorado ===
Harrison did not play during his freshman season in 2020. In 2021 he played all 12 games and finished the season with four special teams points with three knockdown or springing blocks on kickoff returns. In 2022, Harrison played all 12 games, mostly on special teams, and finished the season with seven special teams points with one forced fair catch and five knockdown blocks on kick return along with two receptions for 12 yards.

In 2023, Harrison was switched from wide receiver to tight end and earned the starting tight end spot for the 2023 season. In week 3 against Colorado State, he made seven catches for 76 yards and two touchdowns, including the game-tying two point conversion to send the game into overtime.

On December 4, 2023, Harrison announced that he would entering the transfer portal.

=== San Diego State ===
On December 18, 2023, Harrison announced that he would be transferring to San Diego State.

Year	Team	Games		Receiving			
Year	Team	GP	GS	Rec	Yards	Avg	TD
2020	Colorado	Redshirt (redshirt)					
2021	Colorado	12	0	0	0	0.0	0
2022	Colorado	12	0	2	12	6.0	0
2023	Colorado	12	4	31	284	9.2	5
2024	San Diego State	12	4	18	150	8.3	0
Career		48	8	51	446	8.7	5
