= Cormani McClain =

American football cornerback (born 2004)

No. 25 – Florida Gators
- Position: Cornerback
- Class: (redshirt) Junior

Personal information
- Born: February 26, 2004 (age 22); Lakeland, Florida, U.S.
- Listed height: 6 ft 2 in (1.88 m)
- Listed weight: 181 lb (82 kg)

Career information
- High school: Lakeland (FL)
- College: Colorado (2023); Florida (2024–present)
- Stats at ESPN

Cormani McClain (born February 26, 2004) is an American college football cornerback for the Florida Gators. He previously played for the Colorado Buffaloes.

== Early life ==
McClain attended Lakeland Senior High School in Lakeland, Florida. He was one of the top players in the 2023 college football recruiting class, ranked No. 2 nationally by Rivals.com and No. 3 by ESPN and 247Sports. He was touted as "a generational talent with an NFL-ready drive."

McClain originally committed to the University of Miami, but flipped to the University of Colorado Boulder after Deion Sanders was hired as Colorado's head football coach. He was rated by 247Sports as one of the freshmen most likely to make an impact in 2023.

College recruiting (2024)
Name	Hometown	School	Height	Weight	Commit date
Cormani McClain; CB	Lakeland, Florida	Lakeland (FL)	6 ft 3 in (1.91 m)	168 lb (76 kg)	Jan 19, 2023
Cormani McClain; CB	Recruit ratings: Rivals: 247Sports: ESPN: (90)				

== College career ==
=== Colorado ===
McClain's suffered a tumultuous first season at Colorado, which included a falling out with his head coach, and reported bullying from teammate Shilo Sanders.. There were significant concerns about his attitude and his level of commitment to the program.

=== Florida ===
He transferred to the University of Florida on May 15, 2024. McClain redshirted his first season at Florida, playing in four games and starting one. Against Kentucky, he returned an interception 40 yards for a touchdown. He also played against #2 Georgia and started against #5 Texas, recording 10 tackles and three pass deflections over the season.
