= Trevor Woods =

American football player (born 2002)

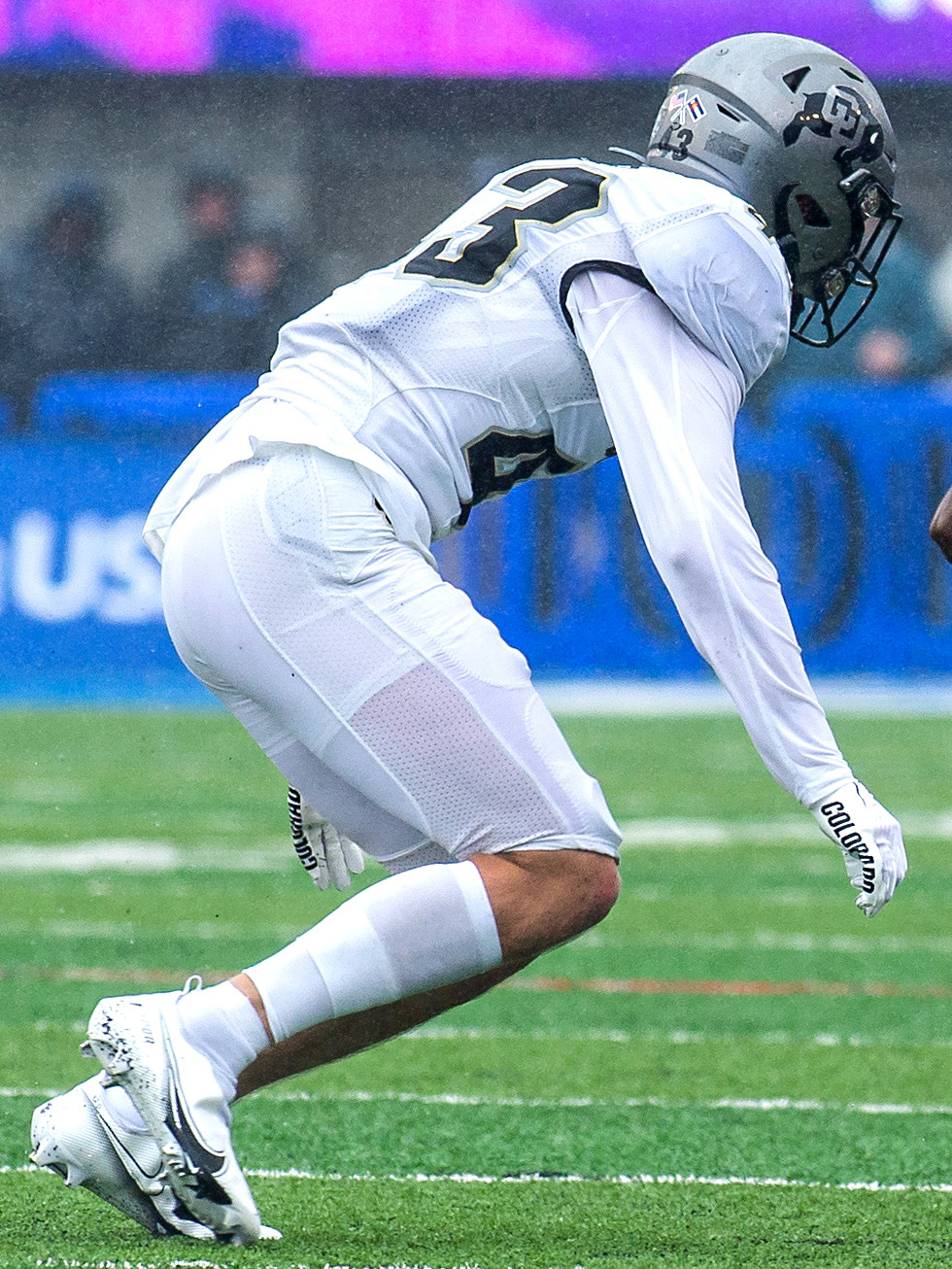
- Woods with Colorado in 2022

No. 43 – Jacksonville State Gamecocks
- Position: Safety
- Class: Senior

Personal information
- Born: September 20, 2002 (age 24); Houston, Texas, U.S.
- Listed height: 6 ft 2 in (1.88 m)
- Listed weight: 209 lb (95 kg)

Career information
- High school: James E. Taylor (Katy, Texas)
- College: Colorado (2021–2024); Jacksonville State (2025–present)
- Stats at ESPN

Trevor Woods (born September 20, 2002) is an American college football safety for the Jacksonville State Gamecocks. He previously played for the Colorado Buffaloes.

== Early life ==
Woods grew up in Katy, Texas and attended James E. Taylor High School, where he played football, baseball, and basketball. As a junior he had 142 tackles, five forced fumbles, and four interceptions, which were all returned for touchdowns. Woods was rated a three-star recruit and committed to play college football at Colorado over offers from Arizona, Pittsburgh, Rice, and several Ivy League schools.

== College career ==
=== Colorado ===
Woods played in 10 games during his freshman season with the Colorado Buffaloes and had 23 tackles and one pass broken up. He made 84 tackles with two tackles for loss, two forced fumbles, five passes broken up and one interception as a sophomore. Following the firing of Colorado head coach Karl Dorrell and the hiring of new coach Deion Sanders, Woods was one of the few players to remain on the team following large-scale roster turnover.

On December 18, 2024, Woods announced that he would enter the transfer portal.

=== Jacksonville State ===
On May 2, 2025, Woods announced that he would transfer to Jacksonville State.
