= Dylan Edwards (American football) =

American football player (born 2004)

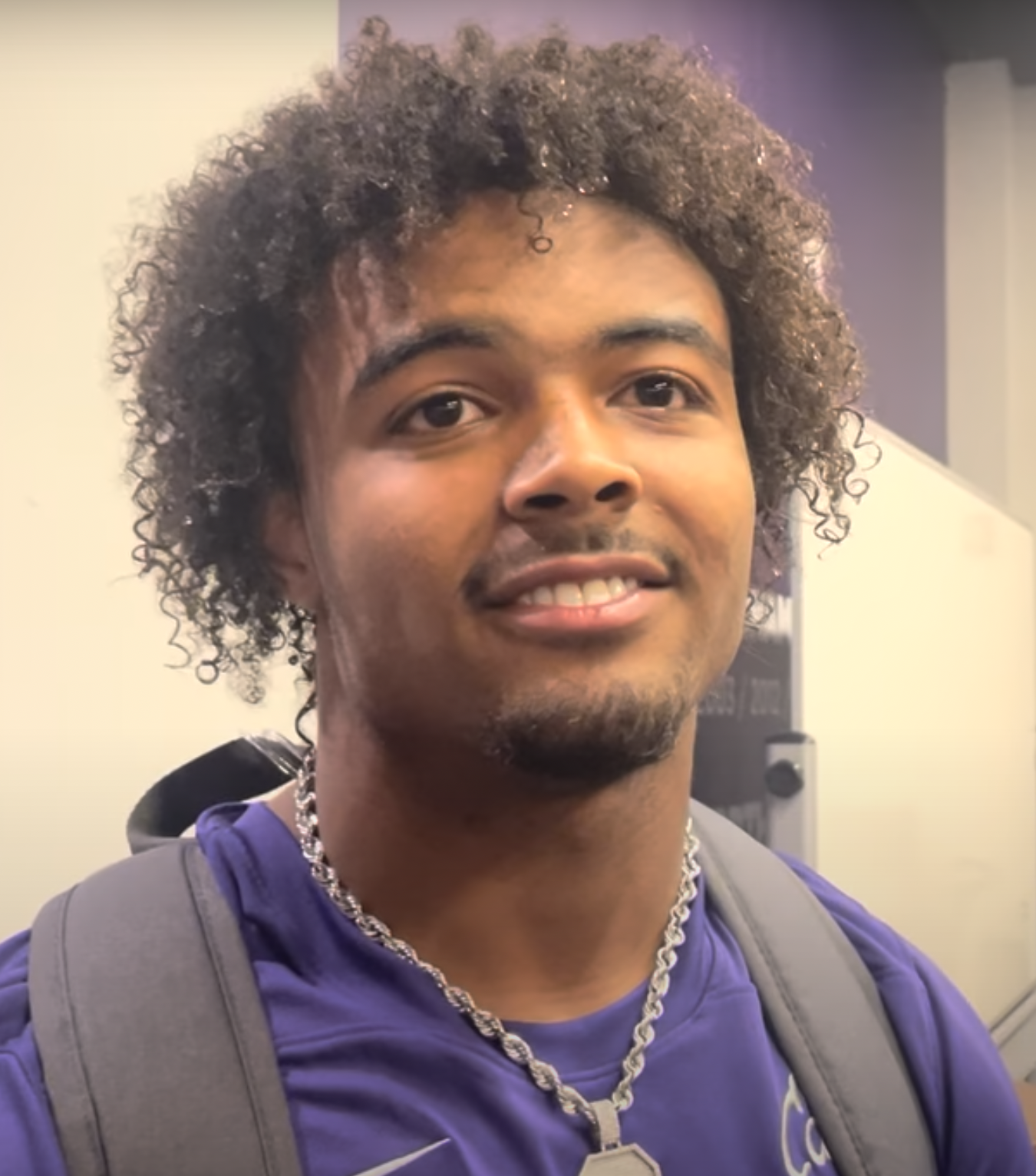
- Edwards in 2024

No. 1 – Kansas Jayhawks
- Position: Running back
- Class: Junior

Personal information
- Born: September 22, 2004 (age 22); Derby, Kansas, U.S.
- Listed height: 5 ft 9 in (1.75 m)
- Listed weight: 175 lb (79 kg)

Career information
- High school: Derby
- College: Colorado (2023); Kansas State (2024–2025); Kansas (2026–present)

Awards and highlights
- 2024 Rate Bowl Offensive MVP
- Stats at ESPN

Dylan Edwards (born September 22, 2004) is an American college football running back for the Kansas Jayhawks. He previously played for the Colorado Buffaloes and Kansas State Wildcats.

== Early life ==
Edwards attended Derby High School in Derby, Kansas. During his career, he rushed for 6,426 yards on 622 carries with 95 touchdowns. He committed to the University of Colorado Boulder to play college football.

== College career ==
In his first collegiate game as a true freshman in 2023, Edwards scored four touchdowns against TCU. For his efforts, Edwards was named Pac-12 Freshman of the Week the week after the game against TCU. Edwards played in all 12 games of the season and was a starter for the first four. On April 23, 2024, Edwards announced he would be entering the transfer portal. Edwards committed to Kansas State University on April 28, 2024. On November 7, 2025, it was announced Edwards had a leg injury and would sit out the rest of the 2025 season, with the intention to transfer. It was also announced he would not receive his previously agreed upon NIL pay. On January 18th, 2026, it was announced that he would be transferring to the University of Kansas.

=== College statistics ===
College statistics
Year	Team	Games		Rushing			Receiving			Kick returns		
Year	Team	GP	Att	Yards	Avg	TD	Rec	Yards	TD	Ret	Yards	TD
2023	Colorado	12	76	321	4.2	1	36	299	4	5	105	0
2024	Kansas State	12	74	546	7.4	5	19	133	2	15	298	0
2025	Kansas State	4	34	205	6.0	2	3	17	0	0	0	0
2026	Kansas	2	12	71	5.9	0	5	52	0	1	17	0
Career		30	196	1,143	5.8	8	63	501	6	21	420	0
