= Cam'Ron Silmon-Craig =

American football player (born 2002)

No. 42 – Jacksonville Jaguars
- Position: Safety
- Roster status: Practice squad

Personal information
- Born: October 30, 2002 (age 24); Birmingham, Alabama, U.S.
- Listed height: 5 ft 10 in (1.78 m)
- Listed weight: 185 lb (84 kg)

Career information
- High school: Trinity Christian (Cedar Hill, Texas)
- College: Jackson State (2021–2022); Colorado (2023–2024)
- NFL draft: 2025: undrafted

Career history
- Jacksonville Jaguars (2025–present)

Awards and highlights
- Second-team All-Big 12 (2024); First-team All-SWAC (2022)

Career NFL statistics as of 2025
- Games played: 3
- Total tackles: 2
- Stats at Pro Football Reference

Cam'Ron Silmon-Craig (born October 30, 2002) is an American professional football safety for the Jacksonville Jaguars of the National Football League (NFL). He played college football for the Jackson State Tigers and Colorado Buffaloes.

== Early life ==
Silmon-Craig attended Fultondale High School in Birmingham, Alabama, for two years before transferring to Trinity Christian High School in Cedar Hill, Texas. As a junior at Trinity, he notched 67 tackles with 14 being for a loss, four sacks, six pass deflections, three interceptions, and one fumble recovery. Silmon-Craig committed to play college football at Jackson State.

== College career ==
=== Jackson State ===
Silmon-Craig finished the 2021 season with 48 tackles, 2.5 sacks, and three interceptions. He had a breakout 2022 season, totaling 61 tackles, a pass breakup, and two interceptions. He was named first team All-SWAC and a HBCU All-American in recognition of his performance in the 2022 season. After the season, Silmon-Craig entered the NCAA transfer portal.

Silmon-Craig finished his Jackson State career with 111 tackles, four sacks, five interceptions and two forced fumbles.

=== Colorado ===
Silmon-Craig transferred to Colorado. In week four of the 2023 season, he intercepted Caleb Williams becoming the first player to pick him off in the 2023 season, but the Buffaloes would lose to USC 48–41.

== Professional career ==
Pre-draft measurables
Height	Weight	Arm length	Hand span	Wingspan	40-yard dash	10-yard split	20-yard split	20-yard shuttle	Three-cone drill	Vertical jump	Broad jump
5 ft 10 3/8 in (1.79 m)	188 lb (85 kg)	29 5/8 in (0.75 m)	8 3/8 in (0.21 m)	5 ft 10 3/4 in (1.80 m)	4.76 s	1.70 s	2.76 s	4.47 s	7.23 s	30.5 in (0.77 m)	9 ft 8 in (2.95 m)
All values from Pro Day

On April 27, 2025, Silmon-Craig signed with the Jacksonville Jaguars as an undrafted free agent. He was waived on August 26, as a part of final roster cuts. Silmon-Craig was re-signed to the team's practice squad the following day. He signed a reserve/future contract with Jacksonville on January 12, 2026.

On August 30, 2026, Silmon-Craig was waived by the Jaguars as a part of final roster cuts; he was re-signed to the team's practice squad the next day.
