= Savion Washington =

American football player (born 2002)

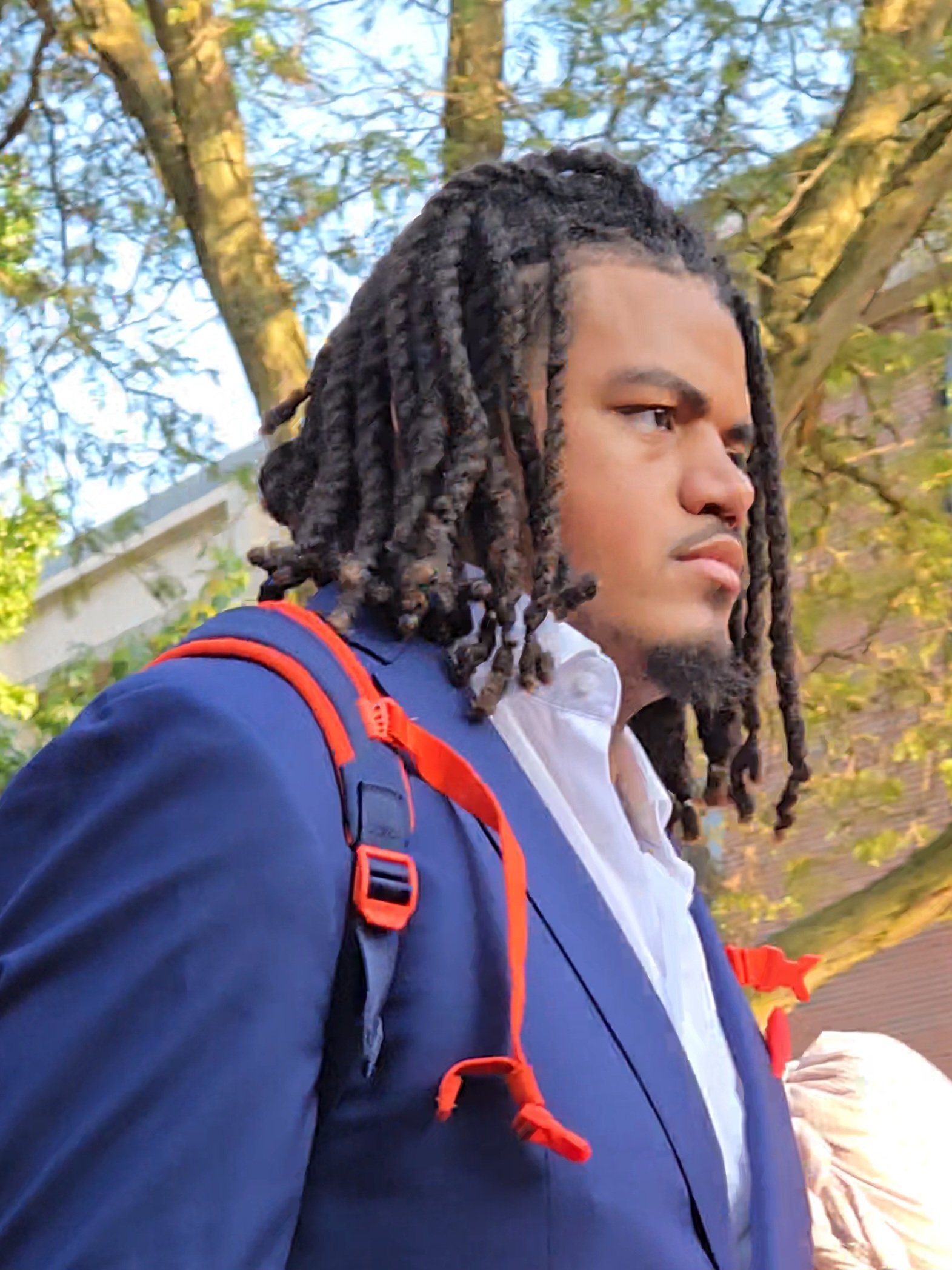
- Washington with Syracuse in 2024

Profile
- Position: Offensive tackle

Personal information
- Born: April 12, 2002 (age 24); Akron, Ohio, U.S.
- Listed height: 6 ft 9 in (2.06 m)
- Listed weight: 340 lb (154 kg)

Career information
- High school: St. Vincent-St. Mary (Akron, Ohio)
- College: Kent State (2020–2022); Colorado (2023); Syracuse (2024)
- NFL draft: 2025: undrafted

Career history
- Los Angeles Chargers (2025)
- Stats at Pro Football Reference

Savion Washington (born April 12, 2002) is an American professional football offensive tackle. He played college football for the Kent State Golden Flashes, Colorado Buffaloes, and Syracuse Orange. He was signed by the Chargers after going undrafted in the 2025 NFL draft.

== Early life ==
Savion Washington was born on April 12, 2002, in Akron, Ohio, and attended St. Vincent–St. Mary High School. He was a consensus 3-star recruit and committed to play at Kent State over Akron and Bowling Green.

== College career ==
=== Kent State ===
Washington redshirted his first year and saw action in only one game in 2021, a matchup against Texas A&M. In 2022, he started 10 games and played in 11. On December 5, 2022, he entered the transfer portal.

=== Colorado ===
On December 19, 2022, Washington committed to Colorado over Oklahoma State. He followed his former head coach Sean Lewis, who was hired as the offensive coordinator by Deion Sanders. In an injury-plagued year, Washington started 9 games and played in 10. On April 15, 2024, he entered the transfer portal for a second time. He was rumored to possibly go to San Diego State to reunite with the aforementioned Lewis or to Northwestern to reunite with his former offensive line coach at Kent State, Bill O'Boyle.

=== Syracuse ===
On April 24, 2024, Washington transferred to Syracuse. He started every game at right tackle for the Orange and was named Honorable Mention All-ACC. He contributed to an offensive line that helped Kyle McCord to set the Syracuse single season passing touchdowns and yards records, the latter of which is an ACC record.

== Professional career ==
Pre-draft measurables
Height	Weight	Arm length	Hand span	Wingspan	40-yard dash	10-yard split	20-yard split	20-yard shuttle	Three-cone drill	Vertical jump	Broad jump	Bench press
6 ft 8 5/8 in (2.05 m)	340 lb (154 kg)	34 1/4 in (0.87 m)	9 7/8 in (0.25 m)	6 ft 11 5/8 in (2.12 m)	5.38 s	1.89 s	3.05 s	4.93 s	8.02 s	25 in (0.64 m)	8 ft 1 in (2.46 m)	19 reps
All values from Syracuse Pro Day

=== Los Angeles Chargers ===
On April 27, 2025, Washington signed a three-year, $2.98 million contract with the Los Angeles Chargers. On July 22, Washington was waived after a failed physical designation in order to make room on the roster for veteran running back Nyheim Miller-Hines. On March 4, 2026, Washington was waived by the Chargers.
