= Amari McNeill =

American football player (born 2003)

No. 78 – New York Jets
- Position: Defensive tackle
- Roster status: Practice squad

Personal information
- Born: June 8, 2003 (age 23); Atlanta, Georgia, U.S.
- Listed height: 6 ft 4 in (1.93 m)
- Listed weight: 300 lb (136 kg)

Career information
- High school: Peachtree Ridge (Suwanee, Georgia)
- College: Tennessee (2021–2022); Colorado (2023–2025)
- NFL draft: 2026: undrafted

Career history
- Kansas City Chiefs (2026)*; New York Jets (2026–present)*
- * Offseason or practice squad member only

Amari Shemar McNeill (born June 8, 2003) is an American professional football defensive tackle for the New York Jets of the National Football League (NFL). He played college football for the Tennessee Volunteers and the Colorado Buffaloes.

== Early life ==
McNeill was born on June 8, 2003, in Atlanta, Georgia as one of two children to Sherry and Anthony McNeill. He was raised in Suwanee, Georgia where he attended Peachtree Ridge High School. While in high school, the 6 ft 3 in (1.91 m) tall 250 pounds (110 kg) McNeill played both offensive and defensive tackle and defensive end positions with the Peachtree Lions football team. In 2020, McNeill helped the Lions to the state playoffs after the team's last appearance in 2016. Graduating in 2021, McNeill was rated a three-star recruiting prospect by 247Sports.

== College career ==
=== Tennessee ===
After committing to the University of Tennessee in 2020, McNeill attained redshirt status for the 2021 season. He joined the Volunteers team on November 20, 2021, as a defensive lineman for the game against South Alabama. As a redshirt freshman, McNeill played six games during the 2022 season. He recorded three tackles and one pass breakup. He was rated a three-star prospect entering the transfer portal.

=== Colorado ===
McNeill transferred in 2023 to the University of Colorado. He played with the Buffaloes as a defensive lineman in all 12 games. After playing for three seasons at Colorado, McNeill finished playing in 32 total games, starting in 12, finishing with 77 total tackles, 42 solo tackles, 15 tackles for loss, seven sacks, six quarterback hurries, three forced fumbles, one pass breakup, and one blocked kick. His defensive totals ranked 66th in sacks and 85th in tackles for loss in Colorado football history.

== Professional career ==
=== Kansas City Chiefs ===
McNeill signed a three-year contract with the Kansas City Chiefs as an undrafted free agent following the 2026 NFL draft. On August 30, he was waived by the Chiefs as a part of final roster cuts.

=== New York Jets ===
On October 27, 2026, McNeill signed with the New York Jets practice squad.

== Personal life ==
McNeill has a sister named Abria.
