= Xavier Weaver =

American football player (born 2000)

Colorado Stampede
- Position: Wide receiver
- Roster status: Unsigned draft pick

Personal information
- Born: October 12, 2000 (age 26); Orlando, Florida, U.S.
- Listed height: 6 ft 0 in (1.83 m)
- Listed weight: 185 lb (84 kg)

Career information
- High school: Orlando Prep (FL)
- College: South Florida (2019–2022); Colorado (2023)
- NFL draft: 2024: undrafted

Career history
- Arizona Cardinals (2024–2026); Colorado Stampede (2027-present)

Awards and highlights
- Second-team All-AAC (2022)

Career NFL statistics as of 2025
- Games played: 12
- Receptions: 7
- Receiving yards: 67
- Stats at Pro Football Reference

Xavier Weaver (born October 12, 2000) is an American professional football wide receiver. He played college football for the South Florida Bulls and Colorado Buffaloes. Weaver signed with the Arizona Cardinals as an undrafted free agent in 2024.

== Early life ==
Weaver was born on October 12, 2000, in Orlando, Florida. He attended Orlando Christian Prep and recorded 2,124 receiving yards with 32 touchdowns in his high school career. Ranked a three-star recruit, he committed to play college football for the South Florida Bulls and became the first person from his school to sign with an FBS team.

== College career ==
Weaver played all 12 games as a true freshman in 2019 and recorded 12 catches for 166 yards. The following year, he appeared in eight out of nine games and started two, having 10 receptions for 136 yards. In 2021, Weaver started 10 of 11 games for the Bulls and had a team-leading 41 catches for 715 yards and two touchdowns, earning first-team all-conference honors by Pro Football Focus and second-team honors by Pro Football Network. Weaver had career-highs with 53 catches for 716 yards and six touchdowns, being named second-team All-AAC.

Weaver announced his intention to transfer in 2023, after receiving an extra year of eligibility due to the COVID-19 pandemic. He ultimately joined the Colorado Buffaloes, and finished his stint at South Florida with 1,735 receiving yards, fourth all-time at the school, and 116 receptions, which ranks sixth. He joined his teammate at South Florida, Jimmy Horn Jr., at Colorado, and was described as a training camp standout. In his Colorado debut, he helped them upset TCU 45–42 and recorded 118 receiving yards. One week later, he caught 10 passes for 170 yards and a touchdown in a 36–14 victory over Nebraska.

== Professional career ==
Pre-draft measurables
Height	Weight	Arm length	Hand span	Wingspan	40-yard dash	10-yard split	20-yard split	20-yard shuttle	Three-cone drill	Vertical jump	Broad jump
6 ft 0 1/4 in (1.84 m)	169 lb (77 kg)	31 1/8 in (0.79 m)	8 7/8 in (0.23 m)	6 ft 1 1/4 in (1.86 m)	4.47 s	1.48 s	2.50 s	4.30 s	7.00 s	37.0 in (0.94 m)	10 ft 7 in (3.23 m)
All values from NFL Combine/Pro Day

Weaver signed with the Arizona Cardinals as an undrafted free agent in 2024. He made the Cardinals 53-man roster out of training camp, the only UDFA signed by the team to do so.

On August 24, 2026, Weaver was placed on injured reserve due to a hamstring injury. He was released on September 2 with an injury settlement.
