= Shedeur Sanders =

American football player (born 2002)

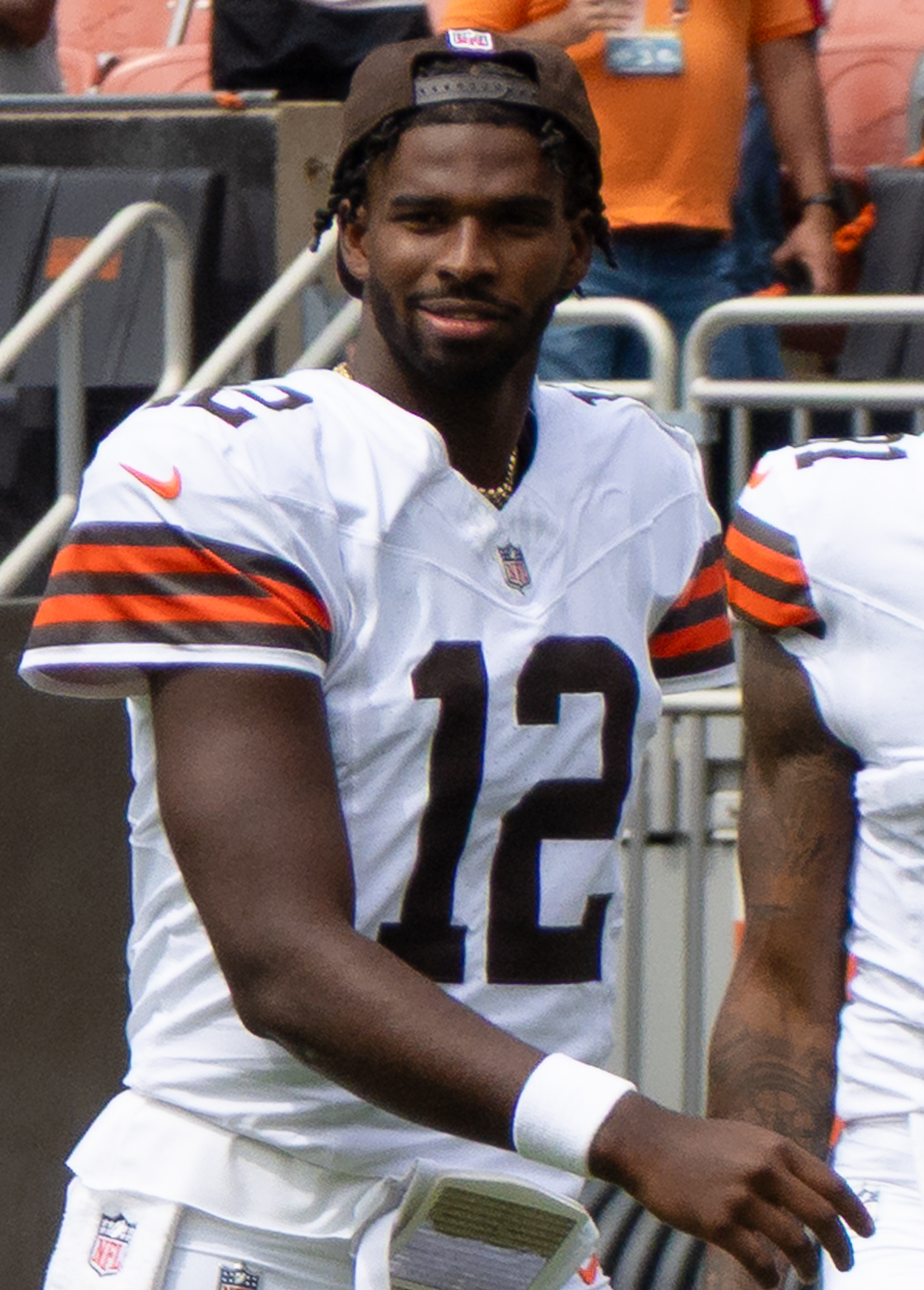
- Sanders in 2025

No. 2 – Cleveland Browns
- Position: Quarterback
- Roster status: Active

Personal information
- Born: February 7, 2002 (age 24); Tyler, Texas, U.S.
- Listed height: 6 ft 2 in (1.88 m)
- Listed weight: 212 lb (96 kg)

Career information
- High school: Trinity Christian (Cedar Hill, Texas)
- College: Jackson State (2021–2022); Colorado (2023–2024)
- NFL draft: 2025: 5th round, 144th overall pick

Career history
- Cleveland Browns (2025–present)

Awards and highlights
- Pro Bowl (2025); Johnny Unitas Golden Arm Award (2024); Deacon Jones Trophy (2022); Jerry Rice Award (2021); Second-team All-American (2024); NCAA completion percentage leader (2024); Big 12 Offensive Player of the Year (2024); SWAC Offensive Player of the Year (2022); SWAC Freshman of the Year (2022); First-team All-Big 12 (2024); First-team All-SWAC (2022); Second-team All-SWAC (2021); Colorado Buffaloes No. 2 retired

Career NFL statistics as of Week 9, 2026
- Passing attempts: 246
- Passing completions: 142
- Completion percentage: 57.7%
- TD–INT: 9–10
- Passing yards: 1,699
- Passer rating: 68.4
- Rushing yards: 197
- Rushing touchdowns: 1
- Stats at Pro Football Reference

Shedeur Deion Sanders (/ʃəˈdʊər/ shuh-dor born February 7, 2002) is an American professional football quarterback for the Cleveland Browns of the National Football League (NFL). The son of Pro Football Hall of Fame cornerback Deion Sanders, he began his college football career under his father with the Jackson State Tigers, winning the Jerry Rice Award and Deacon Jones Trophy between 2021 and 2022. He continued to play under his father with the Colorado Buffaloes, where he won the Johnny Unitas Golden Arm Award and Big 12 Offensive Player of the Year in 2024 after leading the NCAA in completion percentage. Sanders was selected by the Browns in the fifth round of the 2025 NFL draft and was named to the Pro Bowl in his first season.

== Early life ==
Sanders was born on February 7, 2002, in Tyler, Texas, to former NFL player Deion Sanders and Pilar Sanders. His parents are divorced. He has four siblings: Deiondra, Deion, Shilo, and Shelomi. He attended Trinity Christian School in Cedar Hill, Texas, where his father was the school's offensive coordinator. As a senior, he completed 251 of 366 pass attempts for 3,702 yards and 43 touchdowns. He threw for 166 touchdowns over his four year high school career. Sanders was rated a three-star prospect, the #12 quarterback in his class, and initially committed to play college football at Florida Atlantic before flipping to Jackson State after his father was named head coach.

== College career ==
=== Jackson State ===
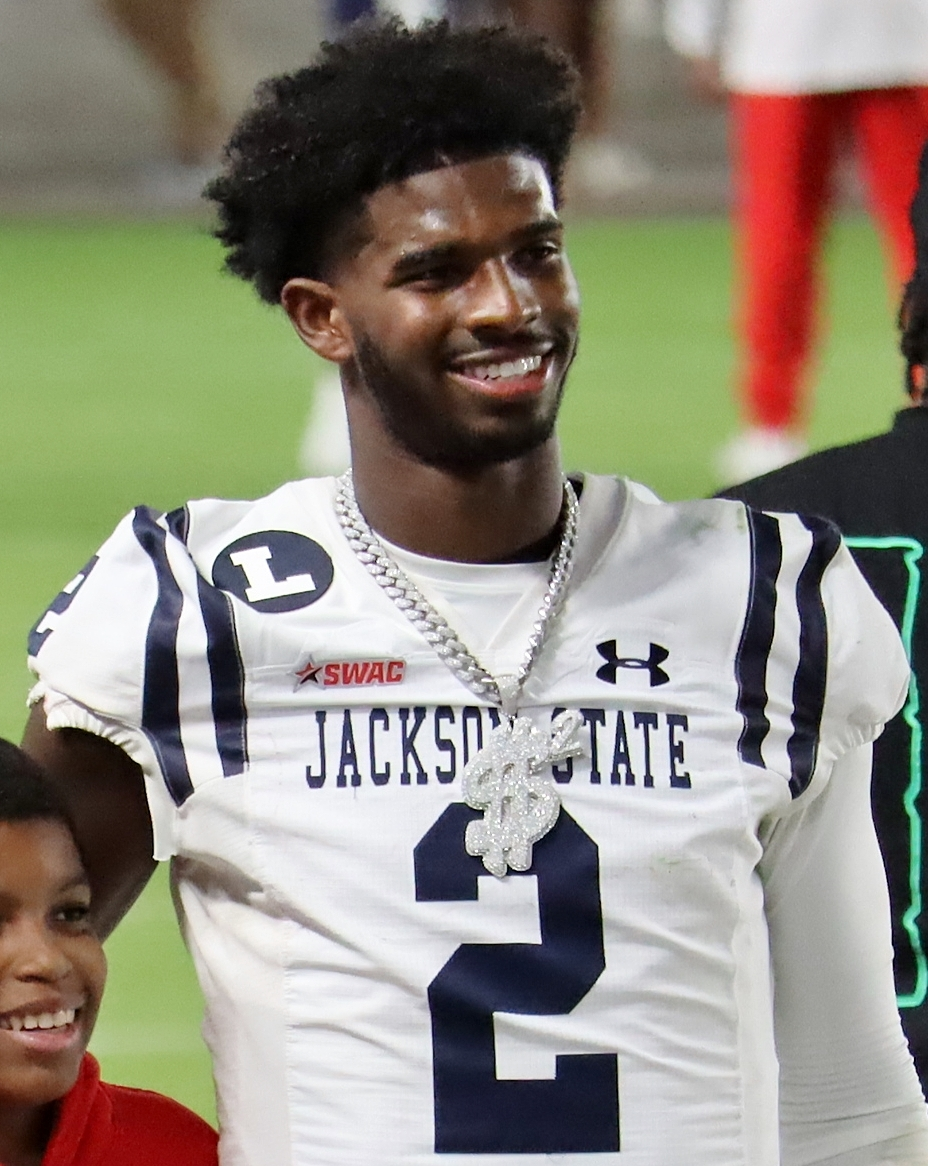
Sanders with the Jackson State Tigers in 2022

Sanders enrolled at Jackson State in January 2021, but was ineligible to play for the team in its spring season which was abbreviated and delayed from its normally intended 2020 schedule due to COVID-19. Sanders was named the Tigers' starting quarterback going into the 2021 fall season, and passed for 3,231 yards with 30 touchdowns and eight interceptions. He was named the Southwestern Athletic Conference (SWAC) Freshman of the Year and second-team All-SWAC and won the Jerry Rice Award as the most outstanding freshman in the NCAA Division I Football Championship Subdivision, becoming the first player from a historically black college or university (HBCU) to win the award. He signed name, image, and likeness (NIL) deals with Gatorade, Beats by Dre, and Nike, being the first college football player to sign with the latter.

To open his sophomore season, Sanders completed 29 of 33 passes for 323 yards and five touchdowns in the Tigers' 59–3 win over Florida A&M. He completed 70.6% of his pass attempts for 3,732 yards with 40 touchdowns and six interceptions as a sophomore and was named the SWAC Offensive Player of the Year. Sanders was also awarded the Deacon Jones Trophy as the nation's top HBCU player. He entered the NCAA transfer portal after the 2022 Celebration Bowl.

=== Colorado ===
After his father Deion was hired as head coach at Colorado, Sanders joined his father and transferred to Colorado. He was immediately named the Buffaloes' starting quarterback.

In his first game for the Buffaloes, Sanders completed 38 of 47 pass attempts for a school-record 510 yards and four touchdowns in the team's 45–42 win over 17th-ranked TCU. In the following game against Nebraska, he had 393 passing yards and two passing touchdowns to go with a rushing touchdown in the win. Sanders quickly became the centerpiece of Colorado's offense, setting a school record for single-season passing yards. He led the Buffaloes to a 3–0 start with 348 yards, four touchdowns, and one interception in the next game, a win over Colorado State. Following the team's first setback against Oregon, he had 371 passing yards, four passing touchdowns, and one interception and a rushing touchdown in a narrow loss to USC. Following a win over Arizona State, he had 400 yards, five touchdowns, and one interception in a loss to Stanford. He missed the season's final game against Utah with a fracture in his back. Overall, he finished the 2023 season with 3,230 passing yards, 27 passing touchdowns, and three interceptions to go with four rushing touchdowns in 11 games as the Buffaloes went 4–8.

Sanders led the Buffaloes to a 9–4 record in 2024 and an appearance in the Alamo Bowl. He finished the season with 4,134 passing yards and 37 touchdowns, with an NCAA-leading 74% completion percentage. He earned Big 12 Offensive Player of the Year honors and named the winner of the Johnny Unitas Golden Arm Award. In April 2025, Colorado announced Sanders's jersey number, along with Travis Hunter's, would be retired before the school's spring game.

== Professional career ==
=== NFL draft ===
Pre-draft measurables
Height	Weight	Arm length	Hand span	Wingspan
6 ft 1 1/2 in (1.87 m)	212 lb (96 kg)	31 1/2 in (0.80 m)	9 3/8 in (0.24 m)	6 ft 5 3/4 in (1.97 m)
All values from NFL Combine

Sanders was selected in the fifth round of the 2025 NFL draft by the Cleveland Browns with the 144th overall pick. Analysts noted that he was drafted later than expected. One anonymous longtime NFL assistant coach was quoted by NFL Network assessing that Sanders "takes unnecessary sacks. He never plays on time. He has horrible body language. He blames teammates. But the biggest thing is he's not that good." The same anonymous coach called Sanders "entitled" and said that the formal interview with the prospect was the "worst" he had been a part of. Another longtime AFC executive echoed that sentiment: "It didn't go great in our interview. He wants to dictate what he's going to do and what's best for him. He makes you feel small." Despite the slide, he celebrated being selected by celebrating with his family and was described by Sports Illustrated in retrospect as handling the draft "with maturity". On May 19, 2025, he signed a four-year deal with the Browns worth $4.6 million and includes a signing bonus of $447,380.

During the first two days of the draft, a prank caller had obtained the private number for the cellphone given to Sanders by the league to communicate with team managers and coaches. While Sanders had his livestream turned on, the prankster called him, pretending to be New Orleans Saints general manager Mickey Loomis and telling Sanders he would "have to wait a little longer". Days later, the caller was revealed to be the son of Atlanta Falcons defensive coordinator Jeff Ulbrich. After investigating, the league fined the Falcons $250,000 and Ulbrich $100,000 over the leak of Sanders' phone number.

=== Cleveland Browns ===
==== 2025 season ====
After serving as a backup for the first nine games of the season, Sanders made his debut in Week 11 against the Baltimore Ravens after fellow rookie Dillon Gabriel suffered a concussion. He went 4-of-16 passing for 47 yards and an interception in a 7-point loss. The following week, he made his first NFL start and went 11-of-20 for 209 yards, one touchdown and one interception, in a 24–10 win over the Las Vegas Raiders.

In Week 14, Sanders threw for his first 300+ yard game against the Tennessee Titans with 364 yards, completing 23 of 42 passes with 3 passing touchdowns, 1 rushing touchdown, and an interception. After scoring a touchdown to cut the Titans' lead to 31–29 with just over a minute remaining, Sanders was controversially taken out of the game by Browns head coach Kevin Stefanski for the potential game-tying two-point conversion attempt in favor for a play out of the Wildcat formation, which failed. Cleveland subsequently lost and was eliminated from playoff contention. The following day, Sanders was named starting quarterback for the remainder of the 2025 season. He finished the year with a 3–4 record in seven starts, a 56.6% completion percentage, 1,400 passing yards, seven passing touchdowns, 10 interceptions, and one rushing touchdown. Sanders also had the worst passer rating in the NFL (minimum 200 attempts).

On January 26, 2026, Sanders was added to the 2026 Pro Bowl roster as a replacement after several AFC quarterbacks suffered injuries or turned down the invitation. Fan voting is also factored into Pro Bowl selections but it is not known how many votes Sanders ended up with. Due to his 2025 statistics, Sanders' selection to the Pro Bowl was met with criticism and comparisons to Tyler Huntley's selection in 2022. He is the first Cleveland Browns quarterback to be selected to the Pro Bowl since Derek Anderson in 2008.

==== 2026 season ====
New Browns head coach Todd Monken and his staff commended Sanders for his ability to grasp the offense, with Monken describing him as "being more decisive" in practice. Despite the praise and Sanders starting much of the previous year, Deshaun Watson was named the starting quarterback to begin the 2026 season. He was the starter for Week 9 versus the Saints with Watson in concussion protocol. Sanders threw for 297 yards and two touchdowns in a 23-22 overtime loss.

== Career statistics ==
Legend
**Bold**	Career high

=== NFL ===
Year	Team	Games			Passing									Rushing					Sacked		Fumbles	
Year	Team	GP	GS	Record	Cmp	Att	Pct	Yds	Y/A	Lng	TD	Int	Rtg	Att	Yds	Y/A	Lng	TD	Sck	SckY	Fum	Lost
2025	CLE	8	7	**3–4**	**120**	**212**	56.6	**1,400**	6.6	**66**	**7**	**10**	68.1	**21**	**169**	**8.0**	**16**	**1**	**23**	**164**	**2**	**1**
2026	CLE	3	1	0–1	22	34	**64.7**	299	**8.8**	64	2	0	**79.2**	10	28	2.8	0	0	5	37	0	0
Career		11	8	3-5	142	246	57.7	1,699	6.9	66	9	10	68.4	31	197	6.4	16	1	28	201	2	1

=== College ===
Legend
Led the NCAA

College statistics
Year	Team	Games			Passing								Rushing			
Year	Team	GP	GS	Record	Comp	Att	Pct	Yards	Avg	TD	Int	Rate	Att	Yards	Avg	TD
2021	Jackson State	13	13	11–2	272	413	65.9	3,231	7.8	30	8	151.7	103	−17	−0.2	3
2022	Jackson State	13	13	**12–1**	341	**483**	70.6	3,733	7.7	**40**	6	160.4	85	**173**	**2.0**	**6**
2023	Colorado	11	11	4–7	298	430	69.3	3,230	7.5	27	3	151.7	**111**	−77	−0.7	4
2024	Colorado	13	13	9–4	**353**	477	**74.0**	**4,134**	**8.7**	37	**10**	**168.2**	100	−50	−0.5	4
Career		50	50	36–14	1,263	1,803	70.1	14,327	7.9	134	27	158.4	399	29	0.1	17

== Awards and honors ==
NFL

- Pro Bowl (2025)

College

- Johnny Unitas Golden Arm Award (2024)
- Deacon Jones Trophy (2022)
- Jerry Rice Award (2021)
- Second-team All-American (2024)
- NCAA completion percentage leader (2024)
- Big 12 Offensive Player of the Year (2024)
- SWAC Offensive Player of the Year (2022)
- SWAC Freshman of the Year (2022)
- First-team All-Big 12 (2024)
- First-team All-SWAC (2022)
- Second-team All-SWAC (2021)
- Colorado Buffaloes No. 2 retired

== Personal life ==
Sanders's older brother, Shilo, also played college football under their father at Jackson State and Colorado. He was signed by the Tampa Bay Buccaneers as an undrafted free agent following the 2025 NFL draft.

Sanders released a hip-hop track, "Perfect Timing", in May 2024.

Sanders has also been involved in fashion modeling.
