= Trevor Reilly =

American football player and coach (born 1988)

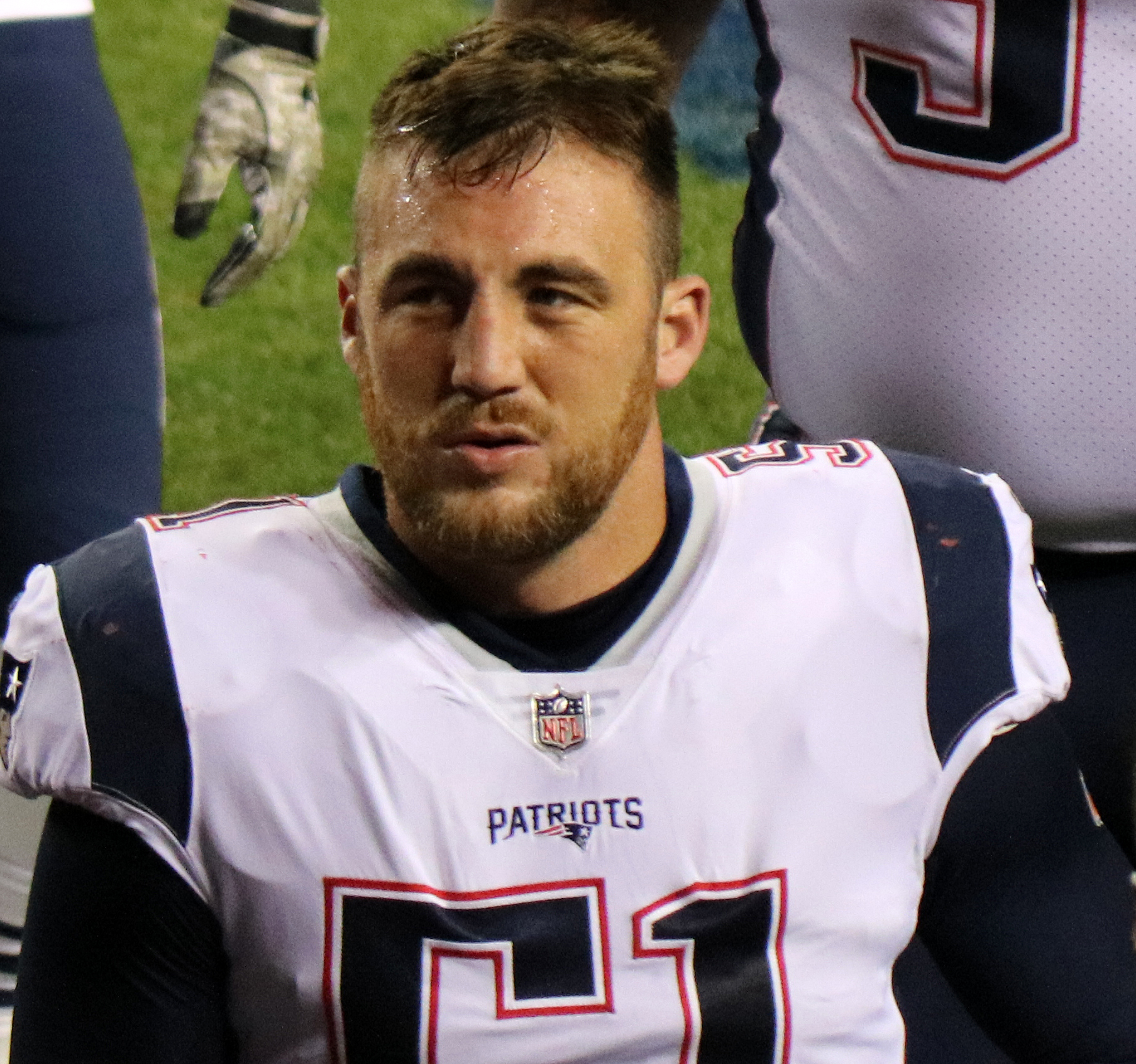
- Reilly with the New England Patriots in 2017

Personal information
- Born: January 17, 1988 (age 38); Valley Center, California, U.S.
- Listed height: 6 ft 5 in (1.96 m)
- Listed weight: 240 lb (109 kg)

Career information
- High school: Valley Center
- College: Utah
- NFL draft: 2014: 7th round, 233rd overall pick

Career history

Playing
- New York Jets (2014–2015); New England Patriots (2016)*; Miami Dolphins (2016–2017); New England Patriots (2017); Salt Lake Stallions (2019)
- * Offseason or practice squad member only

Coaching
- Utah (2018) Graduate assistant; Jackson State (2021–2022) Graduate assistant; Colorado (2023–2024) Special teams analyst

Awards and highlights
- First-team All-Pac-12 (2013)

Career NFL statistics
- Games played: 37
- Total tackles: 35
- Sacks: 1
- Forced fumbles: 1
- Stats at Pro Football Reference

Trevor McKay Reilly (born January 17, 1988) is an American former professional football player who was a linebacker in the National Football League (NFL). He was selected by the New York Jets in the seventh round of the 2014 NFL draft. He played college football for the Utah Utes.

== College career ==
During his tenure, he appeared in 48 games accumulating 235 total tackles, 37 tackles for loss, 8.5 sacks, eight forced fumbles and two interceptions. His senior season, he set career highs in tackles (100), tackles for loss (16) and sacks (8.5) that led him to being named a first-team All-Pac-12 selection. The Bleacher Report named Trevor Reilly a First-team All-American on December 3, 2013.

== Professional career ==
=== New York Jets ===
Reilly was selected by the New York Jets in the seventh round (233rd overall) of the 2014 NFL draft.

Reilly was waived/injured on September 3, 2016. After going unclaimed on waivers and cut, Reilly reverted to the team's injured reserve list. He subsequently reached an injury settlement with the Jets and was released from the reserve list on September 6, 2016.

=== New England Patriots (first stint) ===
On October 20, 2016, the New England Patriots signed Reilly to their practice squad.

=== Miami Dolphins ===
On December 19, 2016, the Miami Dolphins signed Reilly off the Patriots' practice squad. He was waived on September 3, 2017 and was signed to the practice squad the next day. He was released on October 10, 2017.

=== New England Patriots (second stint) ===
On October 12, 2017, Reilly was signed to the Patriots' practice squad. He was promoted to the active roster on October 25, 2017. On December 26, 2017, Reilly was waived by the Patriots. He was re-signed to the practice squad on January 3, 2018.

=== Salt Lake Stallions ===
In late 2018, Reilly joined the Salt Lake Stallions of the Alliance of American Football. The league ceased operations in April 2019.

== Coaching career ==
Reilly began his coaching career at the University of Utah as a student-assistant coach in 2018. In 2021 he became a graduate assistant at Jackson State Tigers. In 2023 Reilly joined Deion Sanders at Colorado Buffaloes as the Special Teams Coordinator, but resigned on August 19, 2024. Trevor is now the General Manager of the Utah Islanders, an independent football program based in Salt Lake City, Utah.
