= Shilo Sanders =

American football player (born 2000)

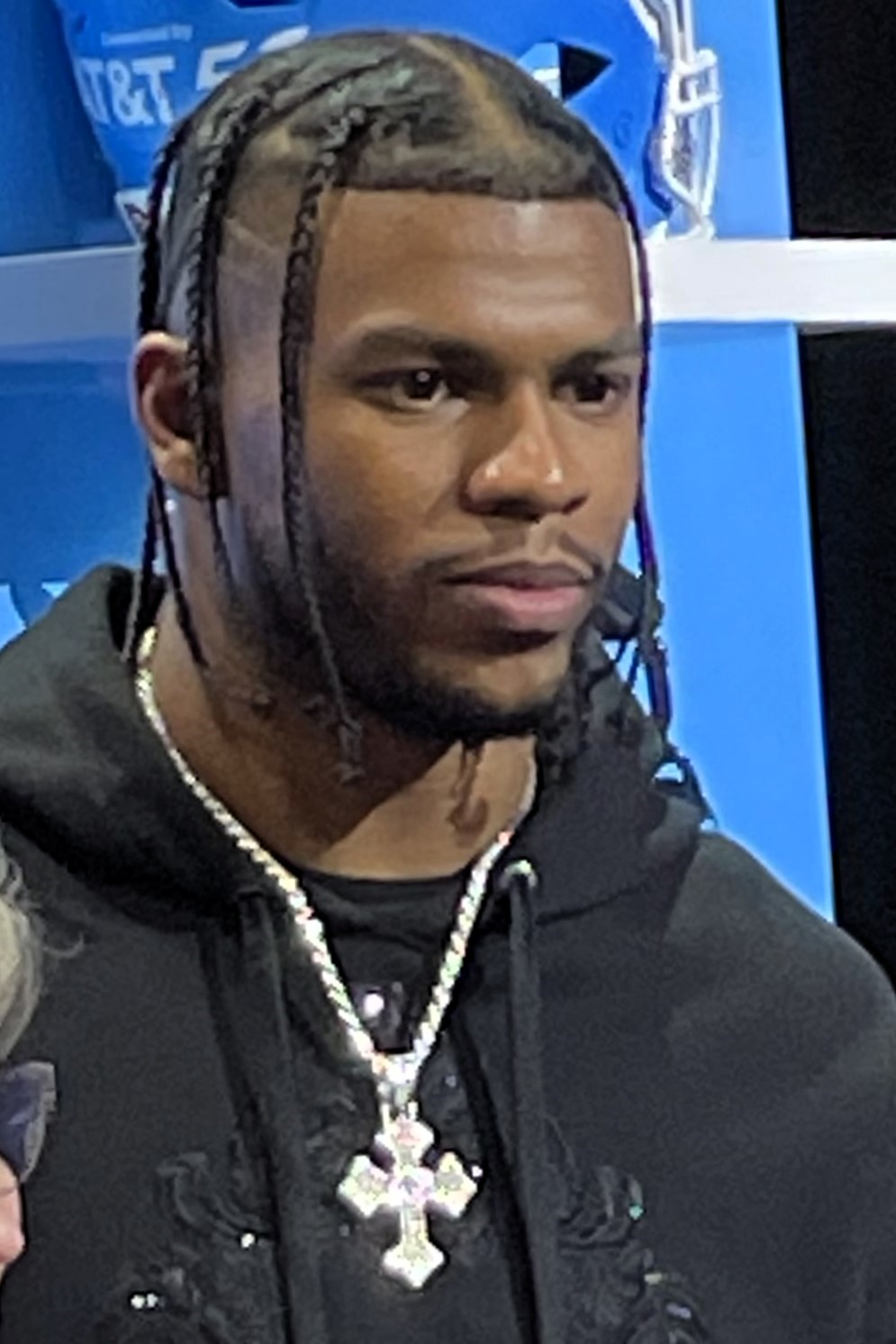
- Sanders in 2025

Profile
- Position: Safety

Personal information
- Born: February 9, 2000 (age 26); Dallas, Texas, U.S.
- Listed height: 6 ft 0 in (1.83 m)
- Listed weight: 196 lb (89 kg)

Career information
- High school: Trinity Christian (Cedar Hill, Texas)
- College: South Carolina (2019–2020); Jackson State (2021–2022); Colorado (2023–2024)
- NFL draft: 2025: undrafted

Career history
- Tampa Bay Buccaneers (2025)*
- * Offseason or practice squad member only

Awards and highlights
- Second-team All-SWAC (2021)
- Stats at Pro Football Reference

Shilo Deion Sanders (born February 9, 2000) is a former American football safety. The son of Pro Football Hall of Fame cornerback Deion Sanders, he began his college football career with the South Carolina Gamecocks before playing under his father with the Jackson State Tigers and Colorado Buffaloes. He earned second-team All-SWAC honors at Jackson State in 2021. Sanders signed with the Tampa Bay Buccaneers of the National Football League (NFL) in 2025 as an undrafted free agent, but was released during the preseason. A year after his release, Sanders announced his retirement from football.

== Early life ==
Sanders is the oldest child of Deion Sanders and Pilar Sanders. His parents are divorced. He has two older half-siblings: Deiondra and Deion, and two younger siblings, Shedeur and Shelomi. Sanders attended Trinity Christian High School in Cedar Hill, Texas, where he played safety, wide receiver and return specialist. His father was the offensive coordinator at Trinity Christian High School throughout his son's high school career.

In his high-school career, he recorded 24 tackles, one pass deflection, five interceptions, and a fumble recovery, rushed for 45 yards and a touchdown, and hauled in 13 receptions for 199 yards and three touchdowns. Sanders committed to play college football at the University of South Carolina over offers from 14 other schools.

== College career ==
=== South Carolina ===
As a freshman at South Carolina in 2019, Sanders recorded two tackles and a fumble recovery. In week four of the 2020 season, he made seventeen tackles in a win over Auburn. Sanders finished the shortened 2020 season with 32 tackles with one going for a loss, and a pass deflection. After the season, he entered the NCAA transfer portal.

=== Jackson State ===
Sanders transferred to Jackson State to continue his collegiate career. In his first season with the Tigers in 2021 he notched 39 tackles, seven pass deflections, two forced fumbles, and four interceptions which was tied for second in the Southwestern Athletic Conference (SWAC). For his performance on the season, Sanders was named second-team all-SWAC. In 2022, he suffered an ACL injury which caused him to only play in seven games, where he recorded 20 tackles and an interception. After the season, Sanders entered the NCAA transfer portal for the second time in his career.

=== Colorado ===
Sanders transferred to Colorado to join his father and brother for the 2023 season. In his team debut, he tallied ten tackles and helped the Buffaloes upset #17 TCU. In week three of the 2023 season, Sanders had an 80-yard pick-six for Colorado's first score of the game and forced a fumble, helping Colorado beat their rival Colorado State.

=== Statistics ===
College statistics
Year	Team	Games		Tackles					Interceptions					Fumbles			
Year	Team	GP	GS	Solo	Ast	Comb	TFL	Sk	Int	Yds	Avg	TD	PD	FR	Yds	TD	FF
2019	South Carolina	4	0	1	0	1	0	0.0	0	0	0.0	0	0	0	0	0	0
2020	South Carolina	9	4	23	9	32	1	0.0	0	0	0.0	0	1	0	0	0	0
2021	Jackson State	13	8	28	11	39	1	0.0	4	99	24.8	0	3	0	0	0	2
2022	Jackson State	7	2	15	5	20	1	0.0	1	0	0.0	0	5	0	0	0	0
2023	Colorado	11	11	55	15	70	1	0.0	1	80	80.0	1	3	1	0	0	4
2024	Colorado	8	8	38	17	55	2	1.0	0	0	0.0	0	1	1	6	1	1
FBS totals		32	23	117	41	158	4	1.0	1	80	80.0	1	5	2	6	1	5
FCS totals		20	10	43	16	59	2	0.0	5	99	19.8	0	8	0	0	0	2
Career		52	33	160	57	217	6	1.0	6	179	29.8	1	13	2	6	1	7

== Professional career ==
Pre-draft measurables
Height	Weight	Arm length	Hand span	40-yard dash	10-yard split	20-yard split	20-yard shuttle	Three-cone drill	Broad jump
5 ft 11 7/8 in (1.83 m)	196 lb (89 kg)	31 3/4 in (0.81 m)	9 1/2 in (0.24 m)	4.52 s	1.60 s	2.65 s	4.40 s	7.16 s	9 ft 5 in (2.87 m)
All values from Pro Day

=== Tampa Bay Buccaneers ===
After going unselected in the 2025 NFL draft, Sanders signed with the Tampa Bay Buccaneers as an undrafted free agent. During a preseason game against the Buffalo Bills on August 23, Sanders was ejected following an unnecessary roughness penalty for punching Bills tight end Zach Davidson after a play. Head coach Todd Bowles said the punch was "inexcusable" in the NFL. On August 26, Sanders was waived by the Buccaneers as part of final roster cuts. On August 30, the NFL issued a $4,669 fine to Sanders for throwing a punch in the preseason game from which he was ejected.

In May 2026, Sanders revealed that he had stopped training and had effectively retired from professional football.

== Personal life ==
Sanders's younger brother, Shedeur, was drafted in the 5th round of the 2025 NFL draft by the Cleveland Browns.

An October 2016 lawsuit filed in Dallas District Court alleged Sanders attacked a security officer. Following a dispute about Sanders disrupting a high school class, John Darjean claimed Sanders slammed his elbow into Darjean's chest and continued to hit Darjean after he fell. The case went to trial in 2022, but Sanders did not appear for the trial, so a default judgment was entered against him. The court ordered Sanders to pay Darjean $11.89 million.

In October 2023, Sanders filed for bankruptcy, declaring he had $11.3 million in liabilities, including the court judgment against him. The bankruptcy petition stated Sanders had $478,000 in assets, including a 2023 Mercedes valued at $75,900 and necklaces valued at $75,000. Sanders’ attorney amended the petition in December 2023 to reduce the value of his assets to $320,000. This reduction included the removal of the high-value necklaces from the list of assets as they were alleged to have been on loan pursuant to an NIL deal with Saki Diamonds. Darjean is currently contesting the bankruptcy filing, alleging Sanders transferred funds received from NIL deals to his company, Big 21, LLC, as a way to improperly shield his assets from the judgment he obtained against Sanders personally. Sanders has admitted he did not disclose several social media NIL deals and that he is the sole owner of Big 21 LLC and SS21 LLC, but denied improperly failing to disclose contracts with those companies related to his NIL deals.

There were at least five investigations into the Sanders-Darjean incident. A 2024 examination by USA Today of those investigations reported that four of them "favored John Darjean". The fifth "initially sided" with Sanders, but after additional information surfaced, the investigators changed their position and decided that fault for the incident simply was "unable to be determined".
