= Jimmy Horn Jr. =

American football player (born 2002)

No. 19 – Cleveland Browns
- Position: Wide receiver
- Roster status: Practice squad

Personal information
- Born: September 12, 2002 (age 24); Sanford, Florida, U.S.
- Listed height: 5 ft 8 in (1.73 m)
- Listed weight: 174 lb (79 kg)

Career information
- High school: Seminole (Sanford)
- College: South Florida (2021–2022); Colorado (2023–2024)
- NFL draft: 2025: 6th round, 208th overall pick

Career history
- Carolina Panthers (2025–2026); Cleveland Browns (2026-present)*
- * Offseason or practice squad member only

Awards and highlights
- First-team All-AAC (2022)

Career NFL statistics as of 2025
- Receptions: 11
- Receiving yards: 108
- Stats at Pro Football Reference

Jimmy Horn Jr. (born September 12, 2002) is an American professional football wide receiver for the Cleveland Browns of the National Football League (NFL). He played college football for the South Florida Bulls and Colorado Buffaloes before being selected by the Carolina Panthers in the sixth round of the 2025 NFL draft.

== Early life ==
Horn grew up in Sanford, Florida, and attended Seminole High School. He caught 42 passes for 736 yards and nine touchdowns and also rushed for 196 yards and three touchdowns as a senior.

== College career ==
Horn began his college career at South Florida. He caught 30 passes for 408 yards and one touchdown during his freshman season. As a sophomore, Horn had 37 receptions for 551 yards and three touchdowns and was named first team All-American Athletic Conference (AAC) as a kick returner after returning nine kickoffs for 209 yards and one touchdown. After the season, he entered the NCAA transfer portal.

Horn ultimately transferred to Colorado after considering offers from Houston, Penn State, and Texas A&M.

== Professional career ==
Pre-draft measurables
Height	Weight	Arm length	Hand span	Wingspan	40-yard dash	10-yard split	20-yard split	20-yard shuttle	Three-cone drill	Vertical jump	Broad jump
5 ft 8 1/8 in (1.73 m)	174 lb (79 kg)	30 3/8 in (0.77 m)	8 3/4 in (0.22 m)	6 ft 2 1/2 in (1.89 m)	4.46 s	1.54 s	2.63 s	4.30 s	7.32 s	38.0 in (0.97 m)	10 ft 8 in (3.25 m)
All values from NFL Combine/Pro Day

=== Carolina Panthers ===
Horn was selected by the Carolina Panthers with the 208th overall pick in the sixth round of the 2025 NFL draft. Horn dropped the ball on a crucial fourth down play in their Wild Card matchup against the Los Angeles Rams. The drop prevented the Panthers from potentially scoring and winning the game.

On September 15, 2026, Horn was waived by the Panthers following a muffed punt and a near-fumble (ruled down by contact) during their season-opening loss to the Chicago Bears.

=== Cleveland Browns ===
On September 18, 2026, Horn signed with the Cleveland Browns' practice squad.

== Career statistics ==
=== NFL ===
==== Regular season ====
Year	Team	Games		Receiving					Fumbles	
Year	Team	GP	GS	Rec	Yds	Avg	Lng	TD	Fum	Lost
2025	CAR	13	0	11	108	9.8	34	0	0	0
Career		13	0	11	108	9.8	34	0	0	0

==== Postseason ====
Year	Team	Games		Receiving					Fumbles	
Year	Team	GP	GS	Rec	Yds	Avg	Lng	TD	Fum	Lost
2025	CAR	1	0	0	0	0.0	0	0	0	0
Career		1	0	0	0	0.0	0	0	0	0
