= 2024 UCF Knights football team =

American college football season

2024 UCF Knights football
- Conference: Big 12 Conference
- Record: 4–8 (2–7 Big 12)
- Head coach: Gus Malzahn (4th season)
- Offensive coordinator: Tim Harris Jr. (1st season)
- Co-offensive coordinator: Darin Hinshaw (2nd season)
- Offensive scheme: Spread option
- Defensive coordinator: Ted Roof (1st season; first 8 games)
- Co-defensive coordinator: Addison Williams (2nd season)
- Base defense: 4–3 or 4–2–5
- Home stadium: FBC Mortgage Stadium

2024 Big 12 Conference football standings
	Conf.			Overall
Team	W		L	W		L
No. 7 Arizona State y$^	7	–	2	11	–	3
No. 15 Iowa State y	7	–	2	11	–	3
No. 13 BYU	7	–	2	11	–	2
No. 25 Colorado	7	–	2	9	–	4
Baylor	6	–	3	8	–	5
TCU	6	–	3	9	–	4
Texas Tech	6	–	3	8	–	5
Kansas State	5	–	4	9	–	4
West Virginia	5	–	4	6	–	7
Kansas	4	–	5	5	–	7
Cincinnati	3	–	6	5	–	7
Houston	3	–	6	4	–	8
Utah	2	–	7	5	–	7
UCF	2	–	7	4	–	8
Arizona	2	–	7	4	–	8
Oklahoma State	0	–	9	3	–	9
Championship: Arizona State 45, Iowa State 19
^ – College Football Playoff participant; $ – Conference champion; y – Championship game participant; Rankings from AP Poll

The 2024 UCF Knights football team represented the University of Central Florida (UCF) as a member of the Big 12 Conference during the 2024 NCAA Division I FBS football season. They were led by Gus Malzahn in his 4th and final season as their head coach. The Knights played their home games at FBC Mortgage Stadium located in Orlando, Florida. (Note: The stadium and the UCf main campus have an Orlando mailing address, but both are located in unincorporated Orange County.)

After eight games, on October 28, defensive coordinator Ted Roof was fired. Starting with the game against Arizona on November 2, assistant Addison Williams was promoted to defensive coordinator and offensive coordinator Tim Harris Jr. was named offensive play-caller.

The Knights started off the season 3–0, with Arkansas transfer KJ Jefferson at quarterback. The Knights notably rallied from a 21-point deficit to defeat TCU 35–34 on the road in week 3. But they would lose 8 of their last 9 to finish 4–8 (2–7 in Big 12). Jefferson was benched, replaced first by EJ Colson, then by Jacurri Brown, then by redshirt freshman Dylan Rizk. Senior running back RJ Harvey was the offensive standout for the year, rushing for 1,577 yards and 22 touchdowns, along with 267 yards receiving and three touchdowns catches. Harvey finished his UCF career with a school record 48 all-time touchdowns, breaking the record previously held by Kevin Smith. With a loss to West Virginia on November 23, the Knights were eliminated from bowl contention for the first time since their winless 2015 season, ending a school record eight straight bowl games.

On November 30, one day after their season concluded, head coach Gus Malzahn resigned to take the offensive coordinator position at Florida State.

== Offseason ==
=== Transfers ===
==== Incoming ====
Player	Position	Previous school
Ja'Varrius Johnson	WR	Auburn
Mac McWilliams	DB	UAB
Keegan Smith	IOL	Central Michigan
Sheldon Arnold II	DB	ETSU
Jacoby Jones	WR	Ohio
Peny Boone	RB	Louisville
Jacurri Brown	QB	Miami
Tre'Quon Fegans	DB	USC
Jack Bernstein	LS	Georgia State
Nyjalik Kelly	DE	Miami
Cedrick Hawkins	S	Ohio State
Evan Morris	TE	Michigan State
KJ Jefferson	QB	Arkansas
Ladarius Tennison	STAR	Ole Miss
Ethan Barr	LB	Vanderbilt
Jesiah Pierce	LB	Texas Tech
Antoine Jackson	DB	East Carolina
Xe'ree Alexander	LB	Idaho
Jabari Brooks	OL	Samford
Myles Montgomery	RB	Cincinnati
Daylon Dotson	DE	UT Martin
DeShawn Pace	STAR	Cincinnati
Byron Threats	S	Cincinnati
Wes Dorsey	OL	Western Kentucky
Reece Adkins	TE	Eastern Kentucky
Zavier Carter	DE	UNLV
Goldie Lawrence	WR	Florida State

==== Outgoing ====
Player	Position	Destination
Zavier Carter	LB	Georgia State
Xavier Williams	DB	Middle Tennessee
Jason Duclona	DB	Liberty
Ja'Maric Morris	DB	Georgia State
Stephen Martin	WR	Samford
Goldie Lawrence	WR	Florida A&M
Nikai Martinez	DB	Michigan State
Timmy McClain	QB	Arkansas State
Josh Celiscar	DE	Texas A&M
Jarvis Ware	DB	UNLV
KD McDaniel	DE	Georgia State
Dallaz Corbitt	DE	Bethune–Cookman
Kervins Choute	DT	UConn
Isaiah Paul	LB	NA
Amari Johnson	WR	Florida A&M
Corey Thornton	DB	Louisville
Keenan Cupit	LB	Virginia Union
Tyler Griffin	WR	ULM
Jaylon Griffin	WR	Texas State
Jordan McDonald	RB	Boston College
Drake Metcalf	IOL	Virginia
Gunnar Smith	QB	Highland CC
Fred Davis II	DB	Jacksonville State
Demarkcus Bowman	RB	NA

== Preseason ==
=== Spring game ===
The 2024 UCF spring exhibition game was played on Friday April 12 at FBC Mortgage Stadium. The team was split into two squads for gameplay, the Knights and the 'Nauts. Two 12-minute halves were followed by a series of player skill challenges. Quarterback KJ Jefferson threw for 271 yards and two touchdown passes.

Date	Time	Spring Game	Site	Result
April 12	7:00 pm	Knights vs. 'Nauts	FBC Mortgage Stadium • Orlando, FL	26-7 'Nauts

=== Big 12 media poll ===
The preseason poll was released on July 2, 2024. UCF was picked to finish eighth.

=== Award watch lists ===
Eleven players were named to the Reese's Senior Bowl watchlist: RJ Harvey, Peny Boone, Deshawn Pace, Brandon Adams, Marcellus Marshall, Mac McWilliams, Malachi Lawrence, Lee Hunter, Kobe Hudson, KJ Jefferson, and Ricky Barber.

Player	Position	Award(s)
KJ Jefferson	QB	Maxwell Award; Davey O'Brien Award; Johnny Unitas Golden Arm Award
RJ Harvey	RB	Maxwell Award; Doak Walker Award
Lee Hunter	DT	Bronko Nagurski Trophy; Outland Trophy; Chuck Bednarik Award; Lombardi Award
Xavier Townsend	WR	Paul Hornung Award
Kobe Hudson	WR	Fred Biletnikoff Award
Caden Kitler	OL	Earl Campbell Tyler Rose Award
William Wells	S	Wuerffel Trophy
Listed in the order that they were released

== Schedule ==
Date	Time	Opponent	Site	TV	Result	Attendance
August 29	7:00 p.m.	New Hampshire*	FBC Mortgage Stadium; Orlando, FL	ESPN+	W 57–3	44,206
September 7	6:30 p.m.	Sam Houston*	FBC Mortgage Stadium; Orlando, FL	ESPN+	W 45–14	43,807
September 14	7:30 p.m.	at TCU	Amon G. Carter Stadium; Fort Worth, TX	FOX	W 35–34	48,889
September 28	3:30 p.m.	Colorado	FBC Mortgage Stadium; Orlando, FL (Big Noon Kickoff)	FOX	L 21–48	45,702
October 5	7:45 p.m.	at Florida*	Ben Hill Griffin Stadium; Gainesville, FL	SECN	L 13–24	90,369
October 12	3:30 p.m.	Cincinnati	FBC Mortgage Stadium; Orlando, FL (rivalry)	ESPN2	L 13–19	42,611
October 19	7:30 p.m.	at No. 9 Iowa State	Jack Trice Stadium; Ames, IA	FS1	L 35–38	61,500
October 26	3:30 p.m.	No. 11 BYU^{†}	FBC Mortgage Stadium; Orlando, FL	ESPN	L 24–37	42,144
November 2	3:30 p.m.	Arizona	FBC Mortgage Stadium; Orlando, FL (Space Game)	FS1	W 56–12	42,110
November 9	7:00 p.m.	at Arizona State	Mountain America Stadium; Tempe, AZ	ESPN2	L 31–35	44,940
November 23	3:30 p.m.	at West Virginia	Milan Puskar Stadium; Morgantown, WV	ESPNU	L 21–31	40,722
November 29	8:00 p.m.	Utah	FBC Mortgage Stadium; Orlando, FL	FOX	L 14–28	40,747
*Non-conference game; ^{†}Homecoming; Rankings from AP Poll (and CFP Rankings, after October 30) - Released prior to game; All times are in Eastern time

- Source

== Game summaries ==
=== vs. New Hampshire (FCS) ===
Game One – New Hampshire Wildcats (FCS) (0–0) vs UCF Knights (0–0) – Game summary

Quarter	1	2	3	4	Total
Wildcats (FCS)	0	3	0	0	3
Knights	6	23	28	0	57

at FBC Mortgage Stadium • Orlando, FL

- Date: Thursday August 29, 2024
- Game time: 7:00 p.m. EDT
- Game weather: 85 °F (29 °C), sunny
- Game attendance: 44,206
- Referee: Cravonne Barrett
- TV announcers (ESPN+): Robert Lee (play-by-play) and Rene Ingoglia (analyst)
- Preview • Recap • Gamecast

Game information

First quarter

- UCF: Colton Boomer 25-yard field goal, 10:55
- UCF: Colton Boomer 44-yard field goal, 4:56

Second quarter

- UCF: KJ Jefferson 3-yard run (Colton Boomer Kick), 14:45
- UCF: Safety, 13:12
- UCF: RJ Harvey 1-yard run (Colton Boomer Kick), 9:40
- NH: Nick Mazzie 38-yard field goal, 4:31
- UCF: RJ Harvey 13-yard run (Colton Boomer Kick), 0:43

Third quarter

- UCF: Myles Montgomery 49-yard pass from KJ Jefferson (Colton Boomer Kick), 9:15
- UCF: Peny Boone 59-yard run (Colton Boomer Kick), 6:39
- UCF: Johnny Richardson 22-yard pass pass from KJ Jefferson (Colton Boomer Kick), 3:05
- UCF: Myles Montgomery 25-yard run (Colton Boomer Kick), 1:28

Fourth quarter

- None

Top passers

- UCF – KJ Jefferson – 7/14, 164 yards, 2 TD, 1 INT
- NH – Seth Morgan – 14/28, 95 yards, 2 INT

Top rushers

- UCF – RJ Harvey – 11 rushes, 142 yards, 2 TD
- NH – Matt Vezza – 2 rushes, 21 yards

Top receivers

- UCF – Kobe Hudson – 2 receptions, 61 yards
- NH – Logan Tomlinson – 6 receptions, 73 yards

Win Probability/Line

- UCF 96.8%, UCF -38.5, Over/Under 58.5

Statistics	UNH	UCF
First downs	9	27
Total yards	166	639
Rushing yards	71	454
Passing yards	95	185
Time of possession	30:27	29:33

UCF won their season opening game for the 9th consecutive season. The UCF offense put up 454 rushing yards, just 7 yards shy of the school record set in 1992. New quarterback KJ Jefferson had a shaky start, completing only 2 passes in the first half. But Jefferson eventually threw for 164 yards and two touchdown passes, and ran for a touchdown. RJ Harvey led the offense with 142 yards rushing, two touchdown runs, along with one reception for 8 yards. Leading 23–3 at halftime, the Knights put the game away with touchdowns on four consecutive drives in the third quarter.

=== vs Sam Houston ===
Sam Houston Bearkats (1–0) vs UCF Knights (1–0) – Game summary

Quarter	1	2	3	4	Total
Bearkats	0	7	0	7	14
Knights	14	10	14	7	45

at FBC Mortgage Stadium • Orlando, FL

- Date: Saturday September 7, 2024
- Game time: 6:30 p.m. EDT; delayed until 7:02 p.m. EDT due to weather
- Game weather: 83 °F (28 °C)
- Game attendance: 43,807
- Referee: Henry Johns
- TV announcers (ESPN+): James Westling (play-by-play) and Leger Douzable (analyst)
- Preview • Recap • Gamecast

Game information

First quarter

- UCF: RJ Harvey 19-yard touchdown (Colton Boomer Kick), 8:17
- UCF: RJ Harvey 2-yard touchdown (Colton Boomer Kick), 3:07

Second quarter

- UCF: Colton Boomer 50-yard field goal, 10:36
- SHSU: Simeon Evans 64-yard touchdown pass from Noah Smith (Christian Pavon Kick), 8:41
- UCF: RJ Harvey 22-yard touchdown (Colton Boomer Kick), 3:59

Third quarter

- UCF: Myles Montgomery 7-yard touchdown (Colton Boomer Kick), 9:58
- UCF: RJ Harvey 2-yard touchdown (Colton Boomer Kick), 7:14

Fourth quarter

- UCF: P. Boone 3-yard touchdown (Colton Boomer Kick), 12:36
- SHSU: Michael Phoenix II 22-yard touchdown pass from Jase Bauer (Christian Pavon Kick), 4:14

Top passers

- UCF – KJ Jefferson – 12/15, 169 yards
- SHSU – Hunter Watson – 9/13, 82 yards

Top rushers

- UCF – RJ Harvey – 19 rushes, 126 yards, 4 TD
- SHSU – Zach Hrbacek – 8 rushes, 25 yards

Top receivers

- UCF – Kobe Hudson – 5 receptions, 104 yards
- SHSU – Simeon Evans – 3 receptions, 89 yards, 1 TD

Win Probability/Line

- UCF 92.0%, UCF -21.5, Over/Under 53.5

Statistics	SHSU	UCF
First downs	12	28
Total yards	286	554
Rushing yards	67	384
Passing yards	219	170
Time of possession	25:57	34:03

RJ Harvey rushed for 126 yards and four touchdowns as UCF defeated Sam Houston 45–14. UCF improved to 2–0 on the season and achieved their 200th Division I FBS game victory. The Knights offense racked up a total of 384 yards rushing, the second week in a row with a strong ground game output. The Knights defense forced two turnovers, plus the special teams unit recovered a botched punt attempt by the Bearkats at the 2 yard line.

Harvey's four rushing touchdowns tied a school-record, last achieved by Isiah Bowser in 2019. The Knights started the season 2–0 for third time in four seasons under head coach Gus Malzahn. For this game, the players' helmets featured decals designed by pediatric patients at the Orlando Health Arnold Palmer Hospital for Children, in honor of Pediactric Cancer Awareness month.

=== at TCU ===
UCF Knights (2–0) at TCU Horned Frogs (2–0) – Game summary

Quarter	1	2	3	4	Total
Knights	0	7	13	15	35
Horned Frogs	14	7	10	3	34

at Amon G. Carter Stadium • Fort Worth, TX

- Date: September 14, 2024
- Game time: 7:30 p.m. EDT
- Game weather: 95 °F (35 °C)
- Game attendance: 48,889
- Referee: David Alvarez
- TV announcers (FOX): Connor Onion (play-by-play) and Mark Helfrich (analyst)
- Preview • Recap • Gamecast

Game information

First quarter

- TCU: Eric McAlister 14-yard touchdown pass from Josh Hoover (Kyle Lemmermann Kick), 9:38
- TCU: Savion Williams 18-yard touchdown pass from Josh Hoover (Kyle Lemmermann Kick), 3:18

Second quarter

- UCF: RJ Harvey 29-yard touchdown pass from KJ Jefferson (Colton Boomer Kick), 14:52
- TCU: Savion Williams 16-yard touchdown pass from Josh Hoover (Kyle Lemmermann Kick), 10:10

Third quarter

- TCU: Jack Bech 50-yard touchdown pass from Josh Hoover (Kyle Lemmermann Kick), 13:28
- UCF: RJ Harvey 1-yard touchdown run (PAT failed), 9:36
- TCU: Kyle Lemmermann 31-yard field goal, 5:03
- UCF: Kobe Hudson 27-yard touchdown pass from KJ Jefferson (Colton Boomer Kick), 4:01

Fourth quarter

- UCF: RJ Harvey 27-yard touchdown run (Jefferson pass to Harvey), 13:38
- TCU: Kyle Lemmermann 24-yard field goal, 8:44
- UCF: Kobe Hudson 20-yard touchdown pass from KJ Jefferson (Colton Boomer Kick), 0:36

Top passers

- UCF – KJ Jefferson – 13/22, 230 yards, 3 TD
- TCU – Josh Hoover – 35/52, 402 yards, 4 TD

Top rushers

- UCF – RJ Harvey – 29 rushes, 180 yards, 2 TD
- TCU – Cam Cook – 11 rushes, 35 yards

Top receivers

- UCF – Kobe Hudson – 6 receptions, 145 yards, 2 TD
- TCU – Jack Bech – 9 receptions, 200 yards, 1 TD

Win Probability/Line

- UCF 55.5%, TCU -2.5, Over/Under 59.5

Statistics	UCF	TCU
First downs	30	26
Total yards	519	460
Rushing yards	289	58
Passing yards	230	402
Time of possession	32:54	27:06

UCF traveled to TCU for their Big 12 conference opener. The Knights erased a 21-point deficit and defeated the Horned Frogs by the score of 35–34. Quarterback KJ Jefferson threw for 230 yards and three touchdown passes, and also rushed for 46 yards. RJ Harvey rushed for 180 yards and two touchdowns, as the UCF offense put up 289 yards rushing total. It was UCF's first intra-conference road victory against an existing Big 12 opponent (one that was a member of the conference prior to 2023).

TCU built a 14–0 lead in the first quarter, with two quick touchdown strikes by quarterback Josh Hoover. UCF's first quarter drives came up empty, with a three-and-out followed by a blocked field goal. The Knights got on the board on the first play of the second quarter, with a 29-yard touchdown pass to RJ Harvey. The Horned Frogs answered, and stretched their lead to 21–7. In the final minute of the second quarter, the Knights were driving deep into TCU territory. The TCU defense managed to keep the Knights out of the endzone, and UCF had to settle for a field goal attempt. Colton Boomer's 27-yard field goal attempt was blocked - his second block of the half - and TCU led 21–7 at halftime.

TCU got the ball to start the third quarter, and drove 75 yards in just four plays. Josh Hoover connected to Jack Bech for a 50-yard touchdown, and the Horned Frogs led 28–7, their largest lead of the night. The Knights, rallied, however, scoring touchdowns on their next three drives. With 13:38 left in regulation, TCU clung to a 31–28 lead.

TCU drove down inside the UCF 10 yard line with under 11 minutes left. On 3rd & Goal at the UCF 1, a costly false start penalty pushed them back to the 6. The UCF defense stiffened, and TCU settled for a field goal and a 34–28 lead. After a TCU three-and-out, UCF took over with 3:44 to go. KJ Jefferson drove the Knights 72 yards in 10 plays for the go-ahead score. Jefferson found Kobe Hudson for a 20-yard touchdown pass with 36 seconds left. Colton Boomer's extra point gave the Knights a 35–34 lead. TCU had one last chance, and managed to make it down to the UCF 40 yard line. Kyle Lemmermann's 58-yard field goal attempt sailed wide right as time expired, and the Knights secured the victory.

=== vs Colorado ===
Colorado Buffaloes (2–1) vs UCF Knights (3–0) – Game summary

Quarter	1	2	3	4	Total
Buffaloes	14	13	14	7	48
Knights	7	7	7	0	21

at FBC Mortgage Stadium • Orlando, FL

- Date: September 28, 2024
- Game time: 3:30 p.m. EDT, delayed until 4:20 p.m. EDT due to weather
- Game weather: 85 °F (29 °C)
- Game attendance: 45,702
- TV announcers (FOX): Kevin Kugler (play-by-play), Brock Huard (analyst), and Allison Williams (sideline reporter)
- Preview • Recap • Gamecast

Game information

First quarter

- (3:49) COL – Travis Hunter 23-yard pass from Shedeur Sanders, Alejandro Mata kick (Drive: 11 plays, 80 yards, 5:28; Colorado 7–0)
- (3:38) UCF – RJ Harvey 75-yard pass from KJ Jefferson, Colton Boomer kick (Drive: 1 plays, 75 yards, 0:11; Tied 7–7)
- (0:10) COL – Will Sheppard 47-yard pass from Shedeur Sanders, Alejandro Mata kick (Drive: 8 plays, 75 yards, 3:28; Colorado 14–7)

Second quarter

- (12:21) COL – Dallan Hayden 14-yard run, Alejandro Mata kick (Drive: 5 plays, 50 yards, 2:01; Colorado 21–7)
- (8:41) UCF – KJ Jefferson 7-yard run, Colton Boomer kick (Drive: 8 plays, 68 yards, 3:33; Colorado 21–14)
- (0:42) COL – Alejandro Mata 36-yard field goal (Drive: 8 plays, 68 yards, 3:02; Colorado 24–14)
- (0:00) COL – Alejandro Mata 46-yard field goal (Drive: 2 plays, 7 yards, 0:08; Colorado 27–14)

Third quarter

- (9:11) COL – Micah Welch 1-yard run, Alejandro Mata kick (Drive: 4 plays, 63 yards, 1:42; Colorado 34–14)
- (3:38) UCF – Xavier Townsend 15-yard pass from KJ Jefferson, Colton Boomer kick (Drive: 3 plays, 92 yards, 1:20; Colorado 34–21)
- (1:32) COL – LaJohntay Wester 10-yard pass from Shedeur Sanders, Alejandro Mata kick (Drive: 6 plays, 65 yards, 2:26; Colorado 41–21)

Fourth quarter

- (5:05) COL – Cam'Ron Silmon-Craig 95-yard fumble recovery, Alejandro Mata kick (Drive: 7 plays, 50 yards, 1:52; Colorado 48–21)

Top passers

- UCF – KJ Jefferson – 20/35, 284 yards, 2 TD, 2 INT
- COL – Shedeur Sanders – 28/35, 290 yards, 3 TD, 1 INT

Top rushers

- UCF – RJ Harvey – 16 rushes, 77 yards
- COL – Isiah Augustave – 4 rushes, 39 yards

Top receivers

- UCF – RJ Harvey – 4 receptions, 92 yards, 1 TD
- COL – Will Sheppard – 4 receptions, 99 yards, 1 TD

Win Probability/Line

- UCF 84.0%, UCF -12.5, Over/Under 59.5

Statistics	COLO	UCF
First downs	26	31
Total yards	418	461
Rushing yards	128	177
Passing yards	290	284
Time of possession	29:57	30:30

UCF hosted Colorado for their Big 12 intra-conference home opener, and the UCF main campus hosted Fox's Big Noon Kickoff pregame show. The Buffaloes defeated the Knights 48–21 behind Shedeur Sanders' three touchdown passes. The Knights offense committed four turnovers in the loss.

=== at Florida ===
UCF Knights (3–1) at Florida Gators (2–2) – Game summary

Quarter	1	2	3	4	Total
Knights	3	0	3	7	13
Gators	7	17	0	0	24

at Ben Hill Griffin Stadium • Gainesville, FL

- Date: October 5, 2024
- Game time: 7:45 p.m.
- Game weather: 76 °F (24 °C)
- Game attendance: 90,369
- Referee: Daniel Gautreaux
- TV announcers (SECN): Taylor Zarzour (play-by-play), Matt Stinchcomb (analyst), and Tori Petry (sideline reporter)
- Preview • Recap • Gamecast

Game information

First quarter

- UF – Elijhah Badger 13-yard pass from Graham Mertz (Trey Smack kick), 7:02
- UCF – Grant Reddick 27-yard field goal, 2:32

Second quarter

- UF – Ja'Kobi Jackson 1 yard run (Trey Smack kick), 12:50
- UF – Montrell Johnson Jr. 3-yard run (Trey Smack kick), 1:50
- UF – Trey Smack 28-yard field goal, 0:04

Third quarter

- UCF – Grant Reddick 37-yard field goal, 6:32

Fourth quarter

- UCF – RJ Harvey 13-yard run (Grant Reddick kick), 7:50

Top passers

- UCF – KJ Jefferson – 12/22, 165 yards, 1 INT
- UF – Graham Mertz – 19/23, 179 yards, 1 TD

Top rushers

- UCF – RJ Harvey – 16 rushes, 75 yards, 1 TD
- UF – Montrell Johnson Jr. – 10 rushes, 54 yards, 1 TD

Top receivers

- UCF – Randy Pittman Jr. – 3 receptions, 44 yards
- UF – Chimere Dike – 4 receptions, 88 yards

Win Probability/Line

- UF 51.9%, UCF -1.5, Over/Under 60.5

Statistics	UCF	UF
First downs	20	18
Total yards	273	359
Rushing yards	108	130
Passing yards	165	229
Time of possession	27:44	32:16

UCF faced Florida for the fourth meeting all-time. The Gators won the first two meetings at Gainesville (1999, 2006), and the Knights won the most recent meeting at the 2021 Gasparilla Bowl. This was the Knights' third and final non-conference game of the season. The Gators jumped out to a 24–3 lead in the first half, then held on for a 24–13 victory.

=== vs Cincinnati (rivalry) ===
Cincinnati Bearcats (3–2) vs UCF Knights (3–2) – Game summary

Quarter	1	2	3	4	Total
Bearcats	3	7	3	6	19
Knights	0	3	7	3	13

at FBC Mortgage Stadium • Orlando, FL

- Date: October 12, 2024
- Game time: 3:30 p.m.
- Game weather: 81 °F (27 °C)
- Game attendance: 42,611
- Referee: Stephen Baron
- TV announcers (ESPN2): Mike Monaco (play-by-play), Kirk Morrison (analyst), and Dawn Davenport (sideline reporter)
- Preview • Recap • Gamecast

Game information

First quarter

- (8:36) CIN – Nathan Hawks 22-yard field goal (Drive: 4 plays, 1 yard, 0:48; Cincinnati 3–0)

Second quarter

- (14:56) CIN – Brendan Sorsby 3-yard run, Nathan Hawks kick (Drive: 11 plays, 61 yards, 5:58; Cincinnati 10–0)
- (1:52) UCF – Grant Reddick 22-yard field goal (Drive: 13 plays, 93 yards, 6:10; Cincinnati 10–3)

Third quarter

- (8:26) UCF – Kobe Hudson 15-yard pass from Jacurri Brown, Grant Reddick kick (Drive: 10 plays, 84 yards, 4:06; Tied 10–10)
- (3:06) CIN – Nathan Hawks 51-yard field goal (Drive: 9 plays, 42 yards, 5:20; Cincinnati 13–10)

Fourth quarter

- (6:32) CIN – Tony Johnson 4-yard pass from Brendan Sorsby (Drive: 9 plays, 52 yards, 4:04; Cincinnati 19–10)
- (2:59) UCF – Grant Reddick 29-yard field goal (Drive: 9 plays, 65 yards, 3:08; Cincinnati 19–13)

Top passers

- UCF – KJ Jefferson – 13/20, 207 yards, 1 TD
- CIN – Brendan Sorsby – 25/38, 241 yards, 1 TD, 2 INT

Top rushers

- UCF – RJ Harvey – 17 rushes, 94 yards
- CIN – Corey Kiner – 17 rushes, 83 yards

Top receivers

- UCF – Kobe Hudson – 7 receptions, 114 yards, 1 TD
- CIN – Joe Royer – 8 receptions, 84 yards

Win Probability/Line

- UCF 59.7%, UCF -2.5, Over/Under 57.5

Statistics	CIN	UCF
First downs	19	19
Total yards	338	397
Rushing yards	97	196
Passing yards	241	201
Time of possession	33:44	26:16

UCF hosted rival Cincinnati. KJ Jefferson was benched during the week and freshman EJ Colson started at quarterback. Jacurri Brown eventually took over in the middle of the first quarter. The Knights fell 19–13 for their third straight loss.

=== at No. 9 Iowa State ===
UCF Knights (3–3) at No. 9 Iowa State Cyclones (6–0) – Game summary

Quarter	1	2	3	4	Total
Knights	7	14	7	7	35
No. 9 Cyclones	14	0	13	11	38

at Jack Trice Stadium • Ames, IA

- Date: October 19, 2024
- Game time: 7:30 p.m.
- Game weather: 71 °F (22 °C)
- Game attendance: 61,500
- Referee: David Alvarez
- TV announcers (FS1): Trent Rush (play-by-play) and Spencer Tillman (analyst)
- Preview • Recap • Gamecast

Game information

First quarter

- UCF – Jacurri Brown 6-yard touchdown run (Grant Reddick kick), 12:17
- ISU – Carson Hansen 57-yard touchdown run (Kyle Konrardy kick), 6:57
- ISU – Carson Hansen 5-yard touchdown run (Kyle Konrardy kick), 0:30

Second quarter

- UCF – RJ Harvey 80-yard touchdown run (Grant Reddick kick), 11:01
- UCF – Brandon Adams 63-yard interception return (Grant Reddick kick), 1:18

Third quarter

- UCF – Jacurri Brown 67-yard touchdown run (Grant Reddick kick), 13:33
- ISU – Rocco Becht 1-yard touchdown run (Kyle Konrardy kick), 8:36
- ISU – Jayden Higgins 12-yard pass from Rocco Becht (PAT blocked), 0:51

Fourth quarter

- UCF – RJ Harvey 1-yard touchdown run (Grant Reddick kick), 11:38
- ISU – Kyle Konrardy 30-yard field goal, 8:53
- ISU – Rocco Becht 1-yard touchdown run (Becht run for Two-Point Conversion), 0:30

Top passers

- UCF – Jacurri Brown – 8/20, 62 yards, 2 INT
- ISU – Rocco Becht – 20/46, 274 yards, 1 TD, 2 INT

Top rushers

- UCF – RJ Harvey – 25 rushes, 198 yards, 2TD
- ISU – Rocco Becht – 20 rushes, 97 yards, 2 TD

Top receivers

- UCF – Kobe Hudson – 3 receptions, 26 yards
- ISU – Jaylin Noel – 8 receptions, 153 yards

Win Probability/Line

- ISU 72.1%, ISU -13.5, Over/Under 49.5

Statistics	UCF	ISU
First downs	14	28
Total yards	416	530
Rushing yards	354	256
Passing yards	62	274
Time of possession	22:32	37:28

After playing most of the game the week prior, Jacurri Brown started at quarterback. Brown struggled in the air, completing only 8 passes for 62 yards, and 2 interception. However, he had 154 yards on the ground, and two touchdown runs. The Knights offense, led by RJ Harvey, racked up 354 total yards rushing. The UCF defense made two interceptions - a 63-yard "pick-six" by Brandon Adams, and a 70-yard interception return by Braeden Marshall that led to a touchdown. The Knights were leading #9 Iowa State 35–30 on the road with less than two minutes remaining in the fourth quarter. Rocco Becht then drove the Cyclones 80 yards in 11 plays, scoring the game-winning touchdown with 30 seconds left. The Knights fell to 3–4 on the season.

=== vs No. 11 BYU ===
No. 11 BYU Cougars (7–0) vs UCF Knights (3–4) – Game summary

Quarter	1	2	3	4	Total
No. 11 Cougars	7	17	10	3	37
Knights	0	10	0	14	24

at FBC Mortgage Stadium • Orlando, FL

- Date: October 26, 2024
- Game time: 3:30 p.m.
- Game weather: 84 °F (29 °C)
- Game attendance: 42,144
- Referee: Kevin Boitmann
- TV announcers (ESPN): Mike Couzens (play-by-play), Brock Osweiler (analyst), and Stormy Buonantony (sideline reporter)
- Preview • Recap • Gamecast

Game information

First quarter

- BYU: Jake Retzlaff 29-yrd touchdown run (Will Ferrin Kick), 10:32

Second quarter

- BYU: Will Ferrin 41-yard field goal, 14:53
- BYU: LJ Martin 15-yard touchdown run (Will Ferrin Kick), 8:13
- UCF: RJ Harvey 2-yard touchdown run (Grant Reddick Kick), 7:02
- UCF: Grant Reddick 38-yard field goal, 0:59
- BYU: Chase Roberts 62-yard touchdown pass from Jake Retzlaff (Will Ferrin Kick), 0:27

Third quarter

- BYU: Mata'ava Ta'ase 1-yard touchdown pass from Jake Retzlaff (Will Ferrin Kick), 7:01
- BYU: Will Ferrin 37-yard field goal, 3:40

Fourth quarter

- UCF: RJ Harvey 5 -yard touchdown run (Dylan Rizk Run for Two-Point Conversion), 9:14
- BYU: Will Ferrin 36-yard field goal, 3:10
- UCF: Jacoby Jones 29-yard touchdown pass from Dylan Rizk (Two-point conversion failed), 0:56

Top passers

- UCF – Dylan Rizk – 6/10, 102 yards, 1 TD
- BYU – Jake Retzlaff – 16/24, 228 yards, 2 TD

Top rushers

- UCF – RJ Harvey – 16 carries, 127 yards, 2 TD
- BYU – LJ Martin – 15 carries, 101 yards, 1 TD

Top receivers

- UCF – Jacoby Jones – 6 receptions, 116 yards, 1 TD
- BYU – Chase Roberts – 2 receptions, 75 yards, 1 TD

Win Probability/Line

- BYU 54.7%, UCF -2.5, Over/Under 53.5

Statistics	BYU	UCF
First downs	29	18
Total yards	483	379
Rushing yards	255	181
Passing yards	228	198
Time of possession	40:28	19:32

BYU built a 17–0 lead in the first half, and pulled away for a 37–24 victory. Jacurri Brown started at quarterback for the Knights, but was benched in the fourth quarter after throwing two interceptions and managing only 96 yards. Dylan Rizk came in at quarterback and drove the Knights for two late touchdown scores, but time ran out for any chance at a comeback.

=== vs Arizona ===
Arizona Wildcats (3–5) vs UCF Knights (3–5) – Game summary

Quarter	1	2	3	4	Total
Wildcats	0	6	6	0	12
Knights	14	21	14	7	56

at FBC Mortgage Stadium • Orlando, FL

- Date: November 2, 2024
- Game time: 3:30 p.m.
- Game weather: 86 °F (30 °C)
- Game attendance: 42,110
- Referee: Tutashinda Salaam
- TV announcers (FS1): Dan Hellie (play-by-play) and Robert Smith (analyst)
- Preview • Recap • Gamecast

Game information

First quarter

- (3:58) UCF – Jacurri Brown 4-yard run, Grant Reddick kick (Drive: 11 plays, 80 yards, 4:54; UCF 7–0)
- (3:38) UCF – RJ Harvey 17-yard run, Grant Reddick kick (Drive: 1 play, 17 yards, 0:04; UCF 14–0)

Second quarter

- (10:34) UCF – RJ Harvey 18-yard run, Grant Reddick kick (Drive: 12 plays, 99 yards, 5:17; UCF 21–0)
- (3:39) UCF – Myles Montgomery 5-yard run, Grant Reddick kick (Drive: 8 plays, 88 yards, 4:13; UCF 28–0)
- (0:46) ARIZ – Sam Olson 23-yard pass from Noah Fifita, Tyler Loop PAT failed (Drive: 10 plays, 78 yards, 2:46; UCF 28–6)
- (0:00) UCF – Randy Pittman Jr. 48-yard pass from Dylan Rizk, Grant Reddick kick (Drive: 5 plays, 75 yards, 0:46; UCF 35–6)

3rd Quarter

- (10:01) UCF – RJ Harvey 19-yard run, Grant Reddick kick (Drive: 5 plays, 76 yards, 2:35; UCF 42–6)
- (8:02) ARIZ – Tetairoa McMillan 2-yard pass from Noah Fifita, Two-point pass conversion failed (Drive: 6 plays, 60 yards, 1:55; UCF 42–12)
- (6:49) UCF – Jacoby Jones 40-yard pass from Dylan Rizk, Grant Reddick kick (Drive: 4 plays, 75 yards, 1:13; UCF 49–12)

4th Quarter

- (1:56) UCF – Randy Pittman Jr. 1-yard pass from Dylan Rizk, Grant Reddick kick (Drive: 8 plays, 57 yards, 4:34; UCF 56–12)

Top passers

- UCF – Dylan Rizk – 20/25, 294 yards, 3 TD
- ARIZ – Noah Fifita – 24/33, 256 yards, 2 TD

Top rushers

- UCF – RJ Harvey – 22 carries, 184 yards, 3 TD
- ARIZ – Kedrick Reescano – 8 carries, 20 yards

Top receivers

- UCF – Jacoby Jones – 5 receptions, 108 yards, 1 TD
- ARIZ – Chris Hunter – 7 receptions, 102 yards

Win Probability/Line

- UCF 76.6%, UCF -5.5, Over/Under 54.5

Statistics	ARIZ	UCF
First downs	14	33
Total yards	261	602
Rushing yards	5	308
Passing yards	256	294
Time of possession	28:39	31:21

UCF hosted Arizona for the 8th annual Space Game. The Knights routed the Wildcats by the score of 56–12 to snap a five-game losing streak, and to improve to 8–0 all-time in the history of the Space Game. Redshirt freshman Dylan Rizk made his first start at quarterback, and threw for 294 yards and three touchdown passes.

RJ Harvey rushed for 184 yards and three touchdowns, two in the first half. Harvey scored his first touchdown of the day on a 17-yard run in a heavy downpour. The play was set up by a Wildcats fumble one play earlier deep in their own territory. Harvey's second touchdown came in the second quarter, capping off a 99-yard drive which started inside their own 1 yard line. With UCF up 28–6 with 4 seconds left in the second quarter, Rizk connected to Randy Pittman Jr. for a 48-yard Hail Mary touchdown as time expired. The Knights took a 35–6 lead into halftime.

The Knights controlled the game from start to finish, racking up 602 yards on offense under new offensive play-caller Tim Harris Jr. The Knights defense, under new defensive coordinator Addison Williams, held the Wildcats to 5 yards rushing, sacked quarterback Noah Fifita five times, and forced a turnover.

=== at Arizona State ===
UCF Knights (4–5) at Arizona State Sun Devils (6–2) – Game summary

Quarter	1	2	3	4	Total
Knights	7	10	7	7	31
Sun Devils	7	14	7	7	35

at Mountain America Stadium • Tempe, AZ

- Date: November 9, 2024
- Game time: 7:00 p.m.
- Game weather: 74 °F (23 °C)
- Game attendance: 44,940
- Referee: Luke Richmond
- TV announcers (ESPN2): Brian Custer (play-by-play), Rod Gilmore (analyst), and Lauren Sisler (sideline)
- Preview • Recap • Gamecast

Game information

First quarter

- (7:46) UCF – RJ Harvey 8-yard run, Grant Reddick kick (Drive: 13 plays, 75 yards, 7:14; UCF 7–0)
- (2:17) ASU – Montana Warren 46-yard return of blocked punt, Parker Lewis kick (Tied 7–7)

Second quarter

- (12:39) UCF – Grant Reddick 45-yard field goal (Drive: 11 plays, 47 yards, 4:38; UCF 10–7)
- (4:56) UCF – Jacurri Brown 6-yard run, Grant Reddick kick (Drive: 11 plays, 66 yards, 5:30; UCF 17–7)
- (0:56) ASU – Chamon Metayer 4-yard pass from Sam Leavitt, Parker Lewis kick (Drive: 9 plays, 75 yards, 4:00; UCF 17–14)
- (0:47) ASU – Laterrance Welch 9-yard interception return, Parker Lewis kick (ASU 21–17)

3rd Quarter

- (5:03) UCF – RJ Harvey 8-yard run, Grant Reddick kick (Drive: 5 plays, 54 yards, 2:15; UCF 24–21)
- (0:43) ASU – Jordyn Tyson 9-yard pass from Sam Leavitt, Parker Lewis kick (Drive: 8 plays, 75 yards, 4:20; ASU 28–24)

4th Quarter

- (13:04) UCF – RJ Harvey 13-yard run, Grant Reddick kick (Drive: 6 plays, 75 yards, 2:39; UCF 31–28)
- (4:55) ASU – Jordyn Tyson 13 Yd pass from Sam Leavitt, Parker Lewis kick (Drive: 9 plays, 71 yards, 4:38; ASU 35–31)

Top passers

- UCF – Dylan Rizk – 24/34, 229 yards, 1 INT
- ASU – Sam Leavitt – 16/33, 161 yards, 3 TD

Top rushers

- UCF – RJ Harvey – 25 carries, 127 yards, 3 TD
- ASU – Kyson Brown – 18 carries, 73 yards

Top receivers

- UCF – Randy Pittman Jr. – 4 receptions, 62 yards
- ASU – Jordyn Tyson – 7 receptions, 99 yards, 2 TD

Win Probability/Line

- ASU 57.6%, Line ASU -2.5, Over/Under 55.5

Statistics	UCF	ASU
First downs	26	18
Total yards	406	260
Rushing yards	177	99
Passing yards	229	161
Time of possession	31:20	28:40

Dylan Rizk threw for 229 yards, and RJ Harvey scored three touchdowns, but the Knights fell 35–31 at Arizona State. Special teams miscues proved costly for the Knights. A blocked punt was returned for an Arizona State touchdown, then later a botched kickoff return led to a pick-six touchdown. With 3:24 left, and trailing by 4, the Knights faced 4th & 2 at the 22 yard line. RJ Harvey was tackled short of the line to gain, turning the ball over on downs. The Sun Devils were able to run the clock down, and secured the victory.

=== at West Virginia ===
UCF Knights (4–6) at West Virginia Mountaineers (5–5) – Game summary

Quarter	1	2	3	4	Total
Knights	0	7	7	7	21
Mountaineers	14	7	7	3	31

at Milan Puskar Stadium • Morgantown, WV

- Date: November 23, 2024
- Game time: 3:30 p.m.
- Game weather: Rain • Temperature: 46 °F (8 °C) • Wind: W 8 miles per hour (13 km/h)
- Game attendance: 40,722
- Referee: Stepen Baron
- TV announcers (ESPNU): Mike Monaco (play-by-play), Kirk Morrison (analyst), and Dawn Davenport (sideline)
- Preview • Recap • Gamecast

Game information

First quarter

- (10:34) WVU – CJ Donaldson Jr. 1-yard run, Michael Hayes II kick (Drive: 8 plays, 68 yards, 3:34; WVU 7–0)
- (1:47) WVU – Jahiem White 3-yard run, Michael Hayes II kick (Drive: 14 plays, 66 yards, 6:21; WVU 14–0)

Second quarter

- (8:37) UCF – RJ Harvey 2-yard run, Grant Reddick kick (Drive: 7 plays, 59 yards, 3:51; WVU 14–7)
- (0:15) WVU – Rodney Gallagher III 12-yard pass from Garrett Green, Michael Hayes II kick (Drive: 12 plays, 71 yards, 3:31; WVU 21–7)

Third quarter

- (12:10) WVU – CJ Donaldson Jr. 1-yard run, Michael Hayes II kick (Drive: 5 plays, 56 yards, 2:45; WVU 28–7)
- (5:38) UCF – Kobe Hudson 45-yard pass from Dylan Rizk, Grant Reddick kick (Drive: 5 plays, 85 yards, 2:18; WVU 28–14)

Fourth quarter

- (12:15) WVU – Michael Hayes II 35-yard field goal (Drive: 14 plays, 57 yards, 8:23; WVU 31–14)
- (5:20) UCF – RJ Harvey 9-yard run, Grant Reddick kick (Drive: 7 plays, 82 yards, 1:48; WVU 31–21)

Top passers

- UCF – Dylan Rizk – 11/21, 172 yards, 1 TD
- WVU – Garrett Greene – 13/21, 118 yards, 1 TD

Top rushers

- UCF – RJ Harvey – 16 carries, 130 yards, 2 TD
- WVU – CJ Donaldson Jr. – 19 carries, 96 yards, 2 TD

Top receivers

- UCF – Kobe Hudson – 2 receptions, 68 yards, 1 TD
- WVU – Hudson Clement – 5 receptions, 81 yards

Win Probability/Line

- UCF 55.4%, Line UCF -3.5, Over/Under 60.5

Statistics	UCF	WVU
First downs	21	20
Total yards	348	318
Rushing yards	176	200
Passing yards	172	118
Time of possession	22:10	37:45

After a bye week, UCF traveled to West Virginia. The Knights fell 31–21, dropping to 4–7, and were eliminated from bowl eligibility. Running back RJ Harvey two rushing touchdowns, bringing his career total to 46, which tied him with Kevin Smith for most all-time in program history.

=== vs Utah ===
Utah Utes (4–7) vs UCF Knights (4–7) – Game summary

Quarter	1	2	3	4	Total
Utes	3	10	0	15	28
Knights	0	7	0	7	14

at FBC Mortgage Stadium • Orlando, FL

- Date: November 29, 2024
- Game time: 8:00 p.m.
- Game weather: Sunny, 71 °F (22 °C)
- Game attendance: 40,747
- Referee: Cravonne Barrett
- TV announcers (FOX): Trent Rush (play-by-play) and Robert Smith (analyst)
- Preview • Recap • Gamecast

Game information

First quarter

- (6:52) UTAH – Cole Becker 37-yard field goal. Drive: 6 plays, 27 yards, 2:42; UTAH 3–0

Second quarter

- (7:45) UTAH – Zemaiah Vaughn 60-yard interception return (Trey Coleman kick). UTAH 10–0
- (3:25) UCF – RJ Harvey 5-yard run (Grant Reddick kick). Drive: 10 plays, 89 yards, 4:17; UTAH 10–7
- (1:17) UTAH – Trey Coleman 24-yard field goal. Drive: 7 plays, 61 yards, 2:00; UTAH 13–7

Third quarter

- No scoring plays

Fourth quarter

- (14:46) UTAH – Landen King 15-yard pass from Luke Bottari (Bottari Pass to Micah Bernard for Two-Point Conversion). Drive: 9 plays, 49 yards, 5:04; UTAH 21–7
- (3:34) UTAH – Smith Snowden 13-yard interception return (Trey Coleman kick). UTAH 28–7
- (0:19) UCF – RJ Harvey 6-yard pass from EJ Colson (Grant Reddick kick). Drive: 14 plays, 75 yards, 3:15; UTAH 28–14

Top passers

- UCF – Dylan Rizk – 11/27, 118 yards, 1 INT
- UTAH – Luke Bottari – 13/20, 111 yards, 1 TD

Top rushers

- UCF – RJ Harvey – 20 carries, 119 yards, 1 TD
- UTAH – Micah Bernard – 22 carries, 87 yards

Top receivers

- UCF – Kobe Hudson – 7 receptions, 79 yards
- UTAH – Zacharus Williams – 6 receptions, 72 yards

Win Probability/Line

- UCF 68.5%, Line UCF -9.5, Over/Under 46.5

Statistics	UTAH	UCF
First downs	11	22
Total yards	196	379
Rushing yards	85	173
Passing yards	111	206
Time of possession	27:34	32:26

UCF hosted Utah on Black Friday in the final game of the regular season. Senior running back RJ Harvey set a new school record for most career touchdowns scored (48), breaking the record previously held by Kevin Smith. However, UCF struggled much of the night with three turnovers including two pick-six touchdowns. The Knights fell by the score of 28–14, and finished the season with a record of 4–8 (2–7 in the Big 12). The following day, head coach Gus Malzahn resigned to take the offensive coordinator position at Florida State.

== Personnel ==
2024 UCF Knights Football
Quarterbacks: 1 KJ Jefferson – 5th-Sr.; 10 Dylan Rizk – (redshirt) Fr.; 11 Jacurri Brown – (redshirt) So.; 12 EJ Colson – Fr.; 17 Riley Trujillo – Fr.; 26 Brock Hansel – (redshirt) So.; Running backs: 0 Johnny Richardson – 5th-Sr.; 7 R.J. Harvey – (redshirt) 5th-Sr.; 13 Peny Boone – (redshirt) Sr.; 20 Kam Ingram – (redshirt) Jr.; 21 Stacy Gage – Fr.; 22 Myles Montgomery – (redshirt) Jr.; 37 Preston Foreman – (redshirt) So.; 43 Tyler Wrenn – (redshirt) So.; Wide receivers: 2 Kobe Hudson – 5th-Sr.; 4 Chauncey Magwood – (redshirt) Jr.; 8 Bredell Richardson – Fr.; 9 Ja'Varrius Johnson – 5th-Sr.; 15 Tyree Patterson – (redshirt) Fr.; 16 Jacoby Jones – 5th-Sr.; 19 Jarrad Baker – (redshirt) 5th-Sr.; 80 Trent Whittemore – (redshirt) Sr.; 81 Kason Stokes – Fr.; 82 Jordyn Bridgewater – Fr.; 85 Carson Hinshaw – Fr.; 87 Dwartney Wortham – (redshirt) So.; 89 Caleb Rollerson – Fr.; Tight ends/H-back: 5 Randy Pittman – So.; 6 Kylan Fox – Fr.; 44 Evan Morris – 5th-Sr.; 83 Reece Adkins – (redshirt) Sr.; 84 Thomas Wadsworth – (redshirt) So.; 86 Jordan Davis – (redshirt) Sr.; 88 Grant Stevens – (redshirt) So.	Offensive Lineman: 50 Patrick Barnett – (redshirt) Sr.; 52 Caden Kitler – (redshirt) So.; 54 Waltclaire Flynn – Fr.; 55 Cameron Kinnie – (redshirt) Sr.; 56 Johnathan Cline – (redshirt) Fr.; 59 Keyon Cox – (redshirt) Fr.; 62 Jabari Brooks – (redshirt) Sr.; 64 Shaheem Hill – (redshirt) So.; 66 Colin Cook – (redshirt) Sr.; 68 Ethan Higgins – (redshirt) Fr.; 69 Paul Rubelt – (redshirt) Sr.; 70 Chase Malamala – Fr.; 71 Thomas Gearity – Fr.; 72 Marcellus Marshall – Sr.; 74 Matthew Prigmore – (redshirt) Fr.; 75 Andrew Phelan – (redshirt) Fr.; 76 Adrian Medley – (redshirt) 5th-Sr.; 77 Keegan Smith – (redshirt) Jr.; 78 Amari Kight – (redshirt) 5th-Sr.; Kickers/Punters: 32 Michael Carter – (redshirt) So.; 33 Grant Reddick – (redshirt) Fr.; 40 Mitch McCarthy – Jr.; 98 Kevin Carrigan – Jr.; Long snappers: 41 Gage King – (redshirt) 5th-Sr.; 42 Aidan Fedigan – (redshirt) So.; 51 Jack Bernstein – (redshirt) So.	Defensive tackles: 2 Lee Hunter – (redshirt) Jr.; 5 Ricky Barber – (redshirt) 5th-Sr. (C); 15 Daylan Dotson – (redshirt) Sr.; 44 Matthew Alexander – (redshirt) Jr.; 55 John Walker – So.; 87 Andrew Rumph – (redshirt) Fr.; 88 Derrick LeBlanc – (redshirt) Fr.; 90 Marcus Downs – Fr.; 91 Keshaun Hudson – (redshirt) So.; 98 Tyrek'e Robinson – Fr.; Linebacker: 3 Deshawn Pace – 5th-Sr.; 14 Jesiah Pierre – 5th-Sr.; 16 T.J. Bullard – (redshirt) So.; 22 Ja'Qualin "Qua" Birdsong – Fr.; 24 Xe'ree Alexander – So.; 25 Camden Vining – (redshirt) Jr.; 28 Andrew Harris – So.; 30 Kam Moore – Jr.; 31 Derrick "DJ" McCormick – Fr.; 32 Ethan Barr – 5th-Sr.; 45 Quentin Hatch – (redshirt) So.; 48 Troy Ford Jr. – (redshirt) Fr.; 49 Quinten Johnson – (redshirt) Jr.; 53 Keeron Henderson – (redshirt) Sr.; Defensive back: 0 Brandon Adams – Sr.; 1 Ja'Cari Henderson – (redshirt) So.; 4 Braeden Marshall – So.; 7 Antione Jackson – So.; 8 Demari Henderson – Jr.; 9 Sheldon Arnold – 5th-Sr.; 10 Quadric Bullard – 5th-Sr.; 13 Ladarius Tennison – 5th-Sr.; 17 Jaylen "AP" Heyward – Fr.; 18 Jakob Gude – Fr.; 19 Hudson Gibbs – (redshirt) Fr.; 20 Mac McWilliams – (redshirt) Sr.; 21 Cedrick Hawkins – (redshirt) Fr.; 23 Tre'Quon Fegans – (redshirt) So.; 26 Christian Peterson – Fr.; 27 Chasen Johnson – Fr.; 34 Terrell Jackson – (redshirt) So.; 36 Chase Jarrett – Fr.; 38 Jashad Presley – Fr.; 39 R.D. Cooper – (redshirt) Sr.; 46 Nicholas Antoine– (redshirt) So.	Defensive ends: 6 Isaiah Nixon – (redshirt) Fr.; 11 Nyjalik Kelly – Jr.; 41 Jack Morgan – (redshirt) So.; 51 Malachi Lawrence – (redshirt) Jr.; 58 Josh Dorsainvil – (redshirt) Jr.; 99 Jamaal Johnson – (redshirt) So.; Legend: (C) Team captain; (S) Suspended; (I) Ineligible; Injured; Redshirt; Coaching staff: Gus Malzahn – Head Coach; Tim Harris Jr. – Offensive coordinator/wide receivers; Addison Williams – Associate head coach/Co-Defensive coordinator/Defensive Backs; Ted Roof –Defensive coordinator/Linebackers (fired; after first 8 games); Darin Hinshaw – Co-Offensive coordinator/quarterbacks; Herb Hand – Offensive line; Brian Blackmon – Special teams coordinator/Tight Ends; Kenny Martin – Defensive Tackles; Kenny Ingram – Defensive Ends/Rush; Kam Martin – Run game coordinator/running backs; Trovon Reed – Cornerbacks; Ross Newton – Chief Analyst/Linebackers(interim; took over LBs remainder of season after Roof was fired); Ernie Sims – Linebackers (fired; before season opener); Sean Beckton Sr. – Senior Analyst; Neal Posey – Offensive Analyst; Conor Raad – Defensive Analyst; Ben Larson – Special Teams Analyst; Dwartney Wortham – Recruiting Analyst; Nate Craig-Myers – Offensive Graduate Assistant; Josh Fridrich – Offensive Graduate Assistant; Michael Mosah – Defensive Graduate Assistant; Alex Ward – Defensive Graduate Assistant; Andrew Blaylock – Assistant AD, Player Personnel & special assistant to head coach; Dan Pirtle – Dir. of Player Personnel; Jeris McIntyre – Dir. High school relations; Deshon Lawrence – Director of Player Development; Alex Mathis – Dir. of Recruiting; Zack Lucas – Dir. of FB Operations; Anthony Kincy – Director of Football Strength & Conditioning; Morris Henry – Associate Director, Sports Performance; Andrew Shirek Espinoza – Asst. Dir. of Sports Performance; Sean Beckton Jr. – Asst. Dir. of Sports Performance; Brian Lund – Associate AD. Head Football Athletic Trainer, Sports Medicine; → Roster updated November, 2024 → Depth chart updated November, 2024

== Awards ==
=== School records ===
- RJ Harvey set the school record for most career touchdowns: 48

=== All-Americans ===
All-American Honors
Player	AP	Phil Steele
RJ Harvey	3	3

Player	Position	Award(s)
KJ Jefferson	QB	Big 12 Preseason Newcomer of the Year; Week 3 — Manning Star of the Week; Week 3 — Davey O'Brien Great 8 List
Kobe Hudson	WR	Big 12 Preseason All-Big 12 Offense
Lee Hunter	DL	Big 12 Preseason All-Big 12 Defense
RJ Harvey	RB	Week 3 — Big 12 Offensive Player of the Week; Week 3 — East–West Shrine Bowl Breakout Player of the Week; Week 3 — Doak Walker Award National Running Back of the Week; Doak Walker Award semifinalist
Randy Pittman; Quadric Bullard; RJ Harvey; Ricky Barber		PFF Big 12 Team of the Week (November 9)

=== Big 12 Conference honors ===
Player	Position	Big 12 All-Conference Team
RJ Harvey	RB	First Team
Lee Hunter	DT	Second Team
Ricky Barber	DT	Honorable mention
Kobe Hudson	WR	Honorable mention
Nyjalik Kelly	DE	Honorable mention
Amari Kight	OL	Honorable mention

== 2025 NFL draft ==
UCF had two players selected in the 2025 NFL draft. RJ Harvey became the highest-drafted running back in program history, being picked in the second round, 60th overall.

Round	Pick	Player	Position	NFL team
2	60	RJ Harvey	RB	Denver Broncos
5	145	Mac McWilliams	CB	Philadelphia Eagles
