= 2024 Utah Utes football team =

American college football season

2024 Utah Utes football
- Conference: Big 12 Conference
- Record: 5–7 (2–7 Big 12)
- Head coach: Kyle Whittingham (20th season)
- Offensive coordinator: Andy Ludwig (10th season; first 7 weeks); Mike Bajakian (interim; remainder of season)
- Offensive scheme: Spread
- Defensive coordinator: Morgan Scalley (9th season)
- Base defense: 4–2–5
- Home stadium: Rice–Eccles Stadium

2024 Big 12 Conference football standings
	Conf.			Overall
Team	W		L	W		L
No. 7 Arizona State y$^	7	–	2	11	–	3
No. 15 Iowa State y	7	–	2	11	–	3
No. 13 BYU	7	–	2	11	–	2
No. 25 Colorado	7	–	2	9	–	4
Baylor	6	–	3	8	–	5
TCU	6	–	3	9	–	4
Texas Tech	6	–	3	8	–	5
Kansas State	5	–	4	9	–	4
West Virginia	5	–	4	6	–	7
Kansas	4	–	5	5	–	7
Cincinnati	3	–	6	5	–	7
Houston	3	–	6	4	–	8
Utah	2	–	7	5	–	7
UCF	2	–	7	4	–	8
Arizona	2	–	7	4	–	8
Oklahoma State	0	–	9	3	–	9
Championship: Arizona State 45, Iowa State 19
^ – College Football Playoff participant; $ – Conference champion; y – Championship game participant; Rankings from AP Poll

The 2024 Utah Utes football team represented the University of Utah as a member of the Big 12 Conference during the 2024 NCAA Division I FBS football season. They were led by Kyle Whittingham in his 20th year as their head coach. The Utes played their games at Rice–Eccles Stadium located in Salt Lake City. The season was the Utes' first year in the Big 12.

The Utes were favored to win the conference in the pre-season, ranking No. 12 in the initial AP poll. During a non-conference win at home against Baylor, starting quarterback Cameron Rising suffered a minor injury to his throwing hand, putting true freshman Isaac Wilson into the starting role. He would succeed in bringing the team to a 4–0 start, including the team's first conference win against then-ranked Oklahoma State. After a home loss to Arizona, Rising returned to the starting role for a road game against Arizona State. Suffering a leg injury on the third play of the game, Rising struggled in the team's second consecutive loss, and eventually underwent surgery for the injury to his leg, causing him to be ruled out for the season. The streak of losses would continue at home against TCU, after which longtime Utah offensive coordinator Andy Ludwig resigned, leaving the role to quarterbacks coach Mike Bajakian. On the road against Houston, Utah picked up another loss on a last-second 43-yard field goal by Houston kicker Jack Martin. At home against 9th-ranked rival BYU, the Utes started sophomore quarterback Brandon Rose over Wilson. Utah was able to nearly seal a win before a 4th-down stop was nullified by a controversial holding call, eventually resulting in a last-second BYU field goal that cemented the loss. Immediately after the game, Utah AD Mark Harlan made an unplanned appearance at the team's post-game press conference, stating in part, "I've been an athletic director for 12 years. This game was absolutely stolen from us. We were excited about being in the Big 12, but tonight I am not." Big 12 commissioner Brett Yormark subsequently fined him $40,000 for "challenging the professionalism of our officials and the integrity of the Big 12 Conference." During the following week, it was revealed that Rose had suffered a tear to his lisfranc ligament before halftime during the BYU game, requiring surgery that sidelined him for the remainder of the season. Starting tight end Brant Kuithe also suffered a season-ending injury during the game. Wilson returned to the starting lineup on the road against Colorado, where a blowout loss gave Utah its first six-game losing streak since 2002. Against Iowa State, Isaac Wilson became the fourth Utah quarterback to suffer a season-ending injury after a "gator roll" tackle injured his knee, putting Luke Bottari into the starting role. Despite two touchdowns from the defense, a missed game-tying field goal cemented Utah's first losing season since 2013. In the team's final game against UCF, the defense was able to score another two touchdowns, breaking the seven-game losing streak with a two-score win.

In a press conference prior to the team's final game, Kyle Whittingham had alluded to potentially retiring, stating “My decision will be made on what’s best for the program, not what’s best for me”, calling defensive coordinator Morgan Scalley "the coach in waiting". New Mexico Lobos offensive coordinator Jason Beck was hired to fill the vacant OC role for Utah on December 5. On December 8th, Whittingham announced he would be returning for his 21st season at head coach via an announcement styled after Michael Jordan's 1995 comeback statement.

== Offseason ==
Positions key
Offense	Defense	Special teams
QB — Quarterback; RB — Running back; FB — Fullback; WR — Wide receiver; TE — Tight end; OL — Offensive lineman; T — Tackle; G — Guard; C — Center	DL — Defensive lineman; DT — Defensive tackle (Note: Includes nose tackle (NT)); DE — Defensive end; EDGE — Edge rusher; LB — Linebacker (Note: Includes middle linebacker (MLB/MIKE), weakside linebacker (WILL), strongside linebacker (SAM), off-ball linebacker, and outside linebacker (OLB)); DB — Defensive back; CB — Cornerback; S — Safety (Note: Includes free safety (FS) and strong safety (SS))	K — Kicker (Note: Also known as a placekicker (PK)); P — Punter; LS — Long snapper; RS — Return specialist (Note: Includes kickoff and punt returners)

=== Team departures ===
2024 Utah offseason departures
Name	Number	Pos.	Height, Weight	Year	Hometown	Notes
Jonah Elliss	#83	DE	6'2", 246 lbs	Junior	Moscow, Idaho	Declared for NFL draft, drafted 76th by the Denver Broncos
Emery Simmons	#18	WR	6'1", 182 lbs	Senior	Parkton, North Carolina	Declared for NFL draft, undrafted
Miles Battle	#1	CB	6'4", 205 lbs	Senior	Houston, Texas	Declared for NFL draft, signed by the Kansas City Chiefs
Keaton Bills	#51	OL	6'4", 316 lbs	Junior	Draper, Utah	Declared for NFL draft, signed by the Buffalo Bills
Sione Vaki	#28	S/RB	6'0", 208 lbs	Sophomore	Antioch, California	Declared for NFL draft, drafted 132nd by the Detroit Lions
Cole Bishop	#8	S	6'2", 207 lbs	Junior	Peachtree City, Georgia	Declared for NFL draft, drafted 60th by the Buffalo Bills
Devaughn Vele	#17	WR	6'5", 210 lbs	Junior	San Diego, California	Declared for NFL draft, drafted 235th by the Denver Broncos
Ja'Quinden Jackson	#3	RB	6'2", 228 lbs	Sophomore	Dallas, Texas	Transferred to Arkansas
Noah Bennee	#89	TE	6'4", 235 lbs	Sophomore	Holladay, Utah	Transferred to Weber State
Mikey Matthews	#0	WR	5'8", 180 lbs	Freshman	Irvine, California	Transferred to California
Mack Howard	#9	QB	6'2", 189 lbs	Freshman	Columbus, Mississippi	Transferred to Samford
Bryson Barnes	#16	QB	6'1", 209 lbs	Junior	Milford, Utah	Transferred to Utah State
Nate Johnson	#13	QB	6'1", 195 lbs	(redshirt) Freshman	Clovis, California	Transferred to Vanderbilt
Kenzel Lawler	#2	CB	6'0", 184 lbs	Sophomore	Corona, California	Transferred to Montana
Farbian Marks	#23	CB	5'10", 191 lbs	Junior	Richmond, Texas	Transferred to Rice
Makai Cope	#11	WR	6'3", 200 lbs	Sophomore	Culver City, California	Transferred to Sacramento State
Jocelyn Malaska	#33	CB	6'1", 178 lbs	(redshirt) Freshman	Bethany, Oklahoma	Transferred to Oklahoma
Jadon Pearson	#39	S	6'3", 200 lbs	(redshirt) Sophomore	Gilbert, Arizona	Transferred to Utah State
Justin Medlock	#6	LB	6'0", 220 lbs	(redshirt) Freshman	Missouri City, Texas	Transferred to SMU
Darrien "Bleu" Stewart	#24	S	6'0", 202 lbs	Sophomore	Las Vegas, Nevada	Transferred to BYU
Hayden Erickson	#46	TE	6'2", 246 lbs	Sophomore	Lehi, Utah	Transferred to South Dakota
Owen Chambliss	#54	LB	6'3", 230 lbs	Freshman	Corona, California	Transferred to San Diego State
Kolinu'u Faaiu	#61	OL	6'3", 326 lbs	Sophomore	Edmonds, Washington	Transferred to Texas A&M
Thomas Yassmin	#87	TE	6'5", 251 lbs	Senior	Sydney, Australia	Declared for NFL draft, signed by the Denver Broncos
Chase Carter	#67	K	6'2", 193 lbs	Senior	Knoxville, Iowa	Graduated
Hayden Furey	#44	LB	6'2", 232 lbs	Senior	Saratoga Springs, Utah	Graduated
Jason Siaosi	#49	LB	6'0", 227 lbs	Senior	Carlsbad, California	Graduated
Sidney Mbanasor	#84	WR	6'5", 214 lbs	(redshirt) Freshman	Pflugerville, Texas	Transferred to Tulane
Chase Kennedy	#13	DE	6'3", 235 lbs	(redshirt) Freshman	Dallas, Texas	Transferred to Arizona
Hunter Deuel	#66	OL	6'5", 305 lbs	(redshirt) Freshman	American Fork, Utah	Transferred to Weber State
JaTravis Broughton	#4	CB	5'11", 190 lbs	Senior	Tulsa, Oklahoma	Transferred to TCU

=== Team additions ===
==== Transfer portal ====
2024 Utah transfer portal additions
Name	Number	Pos.	Height, Weight	Year	Hometown	Notes
Dorian Singer	#3	WR	6'0", 181 lbs	Junior	Saint Paul, Minnesota	Transferred from USC
Taeshaun Lyons	#0	WR	6'1", 177 lbs	Freshman	Hayward, California	Transferred from Washington
Alaka'i Gilman	#11	S	5'10", 194 lbs	Senior	Lāʻie, Hawaii	Transferred from Stanford
Cameron Calhoun	#4	CB	6'0", 177 lbs	Freshman	Cincinnati, Ohio	Transferred from Michigan
Anthony Woods	#28	RB	5'10", 180 lbs	Junior	Palmdale, California	Transferred from Idaho
Kenan Johnson	#1	CB	6'1", 181 lbs	Senior	Minneola, Florida	Transferred from Georgia Tech
John Henry Daley	#90	DE	6'4", 251 lbs	Freshman	Alpine, Utah	Transferred from BYU
Carsen Ryan	#85	TE	6'4", 252 lbs	Junior	Orem, Utah	Transferred from UCLA
Caleb Lohner	#84	TE	6'7", 250 lbs	Senior	Flower Mound, Texas	Transferred from Baylor
Elliot Janish	#46	P	6'2", 200 lbs	Junior	Midwest City, Oklahoma	Transferred from Troy
Sam Huard	#14	QB	6'2", 204 lbs	Senior	Bellevue, Washington	Transferred from Cal Poly
Paul Fitzgerald	#40	DE	6'3", 253 lbs	Sophomore	Idaho Falls, Idaho	Transferred from Utah State
Damien Alford	#9	WR	6'6", 215 lbs	Senior	Montreal, Quebec	Transferred from Syracuse

==== 2024 recruiting class ====
College recruiting
Name	Hometown	School	Height	Weight	Commit date
Isaac Wilson; QB	Draper, Utah	Corner Canyon HS	6 ft 0 in (1.83 m)	190 lb (86 kg)	May 24, 2023
Isaac Wilson; QB	Recruit ratings: Rivals: 247Sports: ESPN: (83)				
David Washington; WR	Las Vegas, Nevada	Las Vegas Academy	6 ft 0 in (1.83 m)	192 lb (87 kg)	Jul 10, 2023
David Washington; WR	Recruit ratings: Rivals: 247Sports: ESPN: (78)				
Zacharyus Williams; WR	Gardena, CA	Junipero Serra HS	6 ft 2 in (1.88 m)	195 lb (88 kg)	Nov 21, 2023
Zacharyus Williams; WR	Recruit ratings: Rivals: 247Sports: ESPN: (77)				
Jeilani Davis; S	Santa Ana, California	Mater Dei HS	6 ft 1 in (1.85 m)	190 lb (86 kg)	May 14, 2023
Jeilani Davis; S	Recruit ratings: Rivals: 247Sports: ESPN: (78)				
Hunter Andrews; RB	Magnolia, Texas	Magnolia HS	6 ft 2 in (1.88 m)	215 lb (98 kg)	Jun 25, 2023
Hunter Andrews; RB	Recruit ratings: Rivals: 247Sports: ESPN: (79)				
Ashtin Kekahuna-Lopes; LB	Bellflower, California	St. John Bosco HS	6 ft 3 in (1.91 m)	215 lb (98 kg)	Jul 15, 2023
Ashtin Kekahuna-Lopes; LB	Recruit ratings: Rivals: 247Sports: ESPN: (76)				
Isaiah Garcia; OT	Draper, Utah	Corner Canyon HS	6 ft 5 in (1.96 m)	280 lb (130 kg)	Jun 29, 2023
Isaiah Garcia; OT	Recruit ratings: Rivals: 247Sports: ESPN: (83)				
Kash Dillon; DE	Draper, Utah	Corner Canyon HS	6 ft 5 in (1.96 m)	220 lb (100 kg)	Aug 12, 2023
Kash Dillon; DE	Recruit ratings: Rivals: 247Sports: ESPN: (76)				
Davis Andrews; S	American Fork, Utah	American Fork HS	6 ft 3 in (1.91 m)	197 lb (89 kg)	Oct 2, 2023
Davis Andrews; S	Recruit ratings: Rivals: 247Sports: ESPN: (79)				
Quimari Shemwell; CB	Long Beach, California	Long Beach Polytechnic HS	6 ft 0 in (1.83 m)	175 lb (79 kg)	Dec 1, 2023
Quimari Shemwell; CB	Recruit ratings: Rivals: 247Sports: ESPN: (76)				
Maurice Evans; S	Brenham, Texas	Blinn College	6 ft 2 in (1.88 m)	190 lb (86 kg)	Dec 9, 2023
Maurice Evans; S	Recruit ratings: Rivals: 247Sports: ESPN: (75)				
Sammie Hunter; CB	Chandler, Arizona	Chandler HS	5 ft 10 in (1.78 m)	175 lb (79 kg)	Jul 1, 2023
Sammie Hunter; CB	Recruit ratings: Rivals: 247Sports: ESPN: (77)				
Luke Bryant; S	Salt Lake City, UT	Olympus HS	6 ft 2 in (1.88 m)	195 lb (88 kg)	Dec 17, 2023
Luke Bryant; S	Recruit ratings: Rivals: 247Sports: ESPN: (75)				
LaTristan Thompson; CB	Mount Pleasant, Texas	Mount Pleasant HS	6 ft 0 in (1.83 m)	165 lb (75 kg)	Dec 10, 2023
LaTristan Thompson; CB	Recruit ratings: Rivals: 247Sports: ESPN: (77)				
Elijah Elliss; DE	Layton, UT	Layton Christian Academy	6 ft 2 in (1.88 m)	200 lb (91 kg)	Dec 20, 2023
Elijah Elliss; DE	Recruit ratings: Rivals: 247Sports: ESPN: (76)				
Rayshawn Glover; WR	Rosenberg, Texas	Trinity Valley CC	5 ft 9 in (1.75 m)	175 lb (79 kg)	Feb 20, 2024
Rayshawn Glover; WR	Recruit ratings: Rivals: 247Sports: ESPN: (75)				
Overall recruit ranking:
Note: In many cases, Scout, Rivals, 247Sports, On3, and ESPN may conflict in their listings of height and weight.; In these cases, the average was taken. ESPN grades are on a 100-point scale.; Sources: "2024 Utah Football Commitment List". Rivals.; "Utah Utes 2024 Player Commits". ESPN.; "2024 Team Ranking". Rivals.com.

== Big 12 media poll ==
The preseason poll was released on July 2, 2024.

Big 12
Predicted finish	Team	Votes (1st place)
1	Utah	906 (20)
2	Kansas State	889 (19)
3	Oklahoma State	829 (14)
4	Kansas	772 (5)
5	Arizona	762 (3)
6	Iowa State	661
7	West Virginia	581
8	UCF	551
9	Texas Tech	532
10	TCU	436
11	Colorado	400
12	Baylor	268
13	BYU	215
14	Cincinnati	196
15	Houston	157
16	Arizona State	141

- First place votes in ()

== Schedule ==
Date	Time	Opponent	Rank	Site	TV	Result	Attendance
August 29	7:00 p.m.	Southern Utah*	No. 12	Rice–Eccles Stadium; Salt Lake City, UT	ESPN+	W 49–0	52,210
September 7	1:30 p.m.	Baylor (Note: Although both Utah and Baylor are in the Big 12, this game will not count in conference standings due to the game being scheduled before Utah joined the Big 12.)*	No. 11	Rice–Eccles Stadium; Salt Lake City, UT	FOX	W 23–12	52,827
September 14	2:30 p.m.	at Utah State*	No. 12	Maverik Stadium; Logan, UT (Battle of the Brothers)	CBSSN	W 38–21	24,107
September 21	2:00 p.m.	at No. 14 Oklahoma State	No. 12	Boone Pickens Stadium; Stillwater, OK	FOX	W 22–19	52,202
September 28	8:15 p.m.	Arizona^{†}	No. 10	Rice–Eccles Stadium; Salt Lake City, UT	ESPN	L 10–23	52,898
October 11	7:30 p.m.	at Arizona State	No. 16	Mountain America Stadium; Tempe, AZ	ESPN	L 19–27	45,310
October 19	8:30 p.m.	TCU		Rice–Eccles Stadium; Salt Lake City, UT	ESPN	L 7–13	53,299
October 26	5:00 p.m.	at Houston		TDECU Stadium; Houston, TX	ESPN+	L 14–17	28,251
November 9	8:15 p.m.	No. 9 BYU		Rice–Eccles Stadium; Salt Lake City, UT (Holy War)	ESPN	L 21–22	54,383
November 16	10:00 a.m.	at No. 17 Colorado		Folsom Field; Boulder, CO (Rumble in the Rockies / Big Noon Kickoff)	FOX	L 24–49	54,646
November 23	5:30 p.m.	No. 22 Iowa State		Rice–Eccles Stadium; Salt Lake City, UT	FOX	L 28–31	52,152
November 29	6:00 p.m.	at UCF		FBC Mortgage Stadium; Orlando, FL	FOX	W 28–14	40,747
*Non-conference game; ^{†}Homecoming; Rankings from AP Poll (and CFP Rankings, after October 30) - Released prior to game; All times are in Mountain time

== Game summaries ==
=== vs. Southern Utah (FCS) ===
Game One – Southern Utah Thunderbirds (FCS) (0-0) vs No. 12 Utah Utes (0-0) – Game summary

Quarter	1	2	3	4	Total
Thunderbirds (FCS)	0	0	0	0	0
No. 12 Utes	7	28	7	7	49

at Rice-Eccles Stadium • Salt Lake City, UT

- Date: Thursday August 29, 2024
- Game time: 7:00 p.m.
- Game weather: 76 °F (24 °C)
- Game attendance: 52,210
- Referee: Henry Johns
- TV announcers (ESPN+): Richard Cross (play-by-play), Barrett Brooks (analyst), and Shane Sparks (sideline reporter)

Game information

First quarter

- (8:46) UTAH – Dijon Stanley 64-yard pass from Cameron Rising (Cole Becker kick) (Drive: 7 plays, 90 yards, 2:56; Utah 7-0)

Second quarter

- (14:48) UTAH – Brant Kuithe 29-yard pass from Cameron Rising (Cole Becker kick) (Drive: 8 plays, 67 yards, 3:01; Utah 14-0)
- (11:27) UTAH – Brant Kuithe 18-yard pass from Cameron Rising (Cole Becker kick) (Drive: 3 plays, 48 yards, 1:44; Utah 21-0)
- (9:04) UTAH – Dijon Stanley 79-yard pass from Cameron Rising (Cole Becker kick) (Drive: 1 play, 79 yards, 0:12; Utah 28-0)
- (1:08) UTAH – Brant Kuithe 11-yard pass from Cameron Rising (Cole Becker kick) (Drive: 11 plays, 74 yards, 5:34; Utah 35-0)

Third quarter

- (4:23) UTAH – Mike Mitchell 4-yard run (Cole Becker kick) (Drive: 12 plays, 57 yards, 6:09; Utah 42-0)

Fourth quarter

- (11:05) UTAH – Caleb Lohner 20-yard pass from Isaac Wilson (Trey Coleman kick) (Drive: 1 play, 20 yards, 0:07; Utah 49-0)

Statistics	SUU	UTAH
First downs	9	26
Total yards	150	513
Rushing yards	79	185
Passing yards	71	328
Passing: Comp–Att–Int	8–21–1	17–26–2
Time of possession	28:45	31:15

Team	Category	Player	Statistics
Southern Utah	Passing	Jackson Berry	6/11, 54 yards, INT
Southern Utah	Rushing	Targhee Lambson	6 carries, 44 yards
Southern Utah	Receiving	Mark Bails	3 receptions, 42 yards
Utah	Passing	Cameron Rising	10/15, 254 yards, 5 TD
Utah	Rushing	Dijon Stanley	6 carries, 34 yards
Utah	Receiving	Dijon Stanley	3 receptions, 150 yards, 2 TD

=== vs. Baylor ===
Game Two – Baylor Bears (1–0) at No. 11 Utah Utes (1–0) – Game summary

Quarter	1	2	3	4	Total
Bears	0	3	9	0	12
No. 11 Utes	17	6	0	0	23

at Rice-Eccles Stadium • Salt Lake City, UT

- Date: September 7, 2024
- Game time: 1:30 p.m. MST
- Game weather: 89 °F (32 °C)
- Game attendance: 52,827
- Referee: Tutashinda Salaam
- TV announcers (FOX): Jason Benetti (play-by-play), Brock Huard (analyst), and Allison Williams (sideline reporter)

Game information

First quarter

- (8:37) UTAH – Money Parks 28-yard pass from Cameron Rising (Cole Becker kick) (Drive: 4 plays, 56 yards, 2:10; Utah 7-0)
- (8:17) UTAH – Micah Bernard 2-yard pass from Cameron Rising (Cole Becker kick) (Drive: 1 play, 3 yards, 0:13; Utah 14-0)
- (0:48) UTAH – Cole Becker 30-yard kick (Drive: 10 plays, 74 yards, 5:52; Utah 17-0)

Second quarter

- (5:21) UTAH – Tao Johnson 77-yard return of blocked field goal (2 point conversion failed) (Drive: 8 plays, 13 yards, 3:03; Utah 23-0)
- (0:00) BAYLOR – Isaiah Hankins 44-yard field goal (Drive: 4 plays, 46 yards, 0:29; Utah 23-3)

Third quarter

- (6:23) BAYLOR – Isaiah Hankins 39-yard field goal (Drive: 11 plays, 70 yards, 5:37; Utah 23-6)
- (0:53) BAYLOR – Josh Cameron 47-yard pass from Dequan Finn (2 point conversion failed) (Drive: 8 plays, 70 yards, 3:54; Utah 23-12)

Fourth quarter

No scoring

Statistics	BAY	UTAH
First downs	12	15
Total yards	223	292
Rushing yards	108	170
Passing yards	115	122
Passing: Comp–Att–Int	9–21–0	12–23–0
Time of possession	25:37	34:23

Team	Category	Player	Statistics
Baylor	Passing	Dequan Finn	9/21, 115 yards, 1 TD
Baylor	Rushing	Dawson Pendergrass	9 carries, 69 yards
Baylor	Receiving	Josh Cameron	2 receptions, 59 yards, 1 TD
Utah	Passing	Cameron Rising	8/14, 92 yards, 2 TD
Utah	Rushing	Micah Bernard	19 carries, 118 yards
Utah	Receiving	Money Parks	3 receptions, 80 yards, 1 TD

=== at Utah State (Battle of the Brothers) ===
Game Three – No. 12 Utah Utes (2–0) at Utah State Aggies (1–1) – Game summary

Quarter	1	2	3	4	Total
No. 12 Utes	3	14	11	10	38
Aggies	7	7	7	0	21

at Maverik Stadium • Logan, UT

- Date: September 14, 2024
- Game time: 2:30 p.m. MST
- Game weather: 80 °F (27 °C)
- Game attendance: 25,513
- Referee: Cravonne Barrett
- TV announcers (CBSSN): Dave Ryan (play-by-play), Robert Turbin (analyst), and Tina Cervasio (sideline reporter)

Game information

First quarter
Second quarter
Third quarter
Fourth quarter

Statistics	UTAH	USU
First downs	23	14
Total yards	460	385
Rushing yards	221	140
Passing yards	239	245
Passing: Comp–Att–Int	20–33–1	18–35–2
Time of possession	37:18	22:42

Team	Category	Player	Statistics
Utah	Passing	Isaac Wilson	20/33, 239 yards, 3 TD, INT
Utah	Rushing	Micah Bernard	17 carries, 123 yards, TD
Utah	Receiving	Brant Kuithe	3 receptions, 68 yards
Utah State	Passing	Bryson Barnes	16/31, 223 yards, 2 TD, 2 INT
Utah State	Rushing	Rahsul Faison	19 carries, 115 yards
Utah State	Receiving	Otto Tia	5 receptions, 78 yards

=== at No. 14 Oklahoma State ===
Game Four – No. 12 Utah Utes (3–0) at No. 14 Oklahoma State Cowboys (3–0) – Game summary

Quarter	1	2	3	4	Total
No. 12 Utes	0	10	3	9	22
No. 14 Cowboys	3	0	0	16	19

at Boone Pickens Stadium • Stillwater, OK

- Date: September 21, 2024
- Game time: 2:00 p.m. MST
- Game weather: 100 °F (38 °C)
- Game attendance: 52,202
- Referee: Michael VanderVelde
- TV announcers (FOX): Jason Benetti (play-by-play), Brock Huard (analyst), and Allison Williams (sideline reporter)

Game information

First quarter

- (8:43) OSU – Logan Ward 23 yard field goal (Drive: 10 plays, 62 yards, 3:31; OSU 3–0)

Second quarter

- (14:56) UTA – Cole Becker 43 yard field goal (Drive: 12 plays, 62 yards, 5:43; Tied 3–3)
- (7:25) UTA – Brant Kuithe 1 yard rush, Cole Becker kick (Drive: 11 plays, 64 yards, 6:28; UTA 10–3)

Third quarter

- (2:39) UTA – Cole Becker 38 yard field goal (Drive: 5 plays, 69 yards, 2:59; UTA 13–3)

Fourth quarter

- (11:29) UTA – Cole Becker 44 yard field goal (Drive: 10 plays, 44 yards, 5:10; UTA 16–3)
- (6:21) UTA – Brant Kuithe 45 yard pass from Issac Wilson (Drive: 1 play, 45 yards, 0:10; UTA 22–3)
- (5:37) OSU – Brennan Presley 28 yard pass from Alan Bowman, Brennan Presley pass from Alan Bowman (Drive: 3 plays, 58 yards, 0:36; UTA 22–11)
- (1:47) OSU – Rashod Owens 9 yard pass from Alan Bowman, Brennan Presley pass from Alan Bowman (Drive: 7 plays, 69 yards, 1:29; UTA 22–19)

Statistics	UTAH	OKST
First downs	20	11
Total yards	456	285
Rushing yards	249	48
Passing yards	207	237
Passing: Comp–Att–Int	17–29–2	19–44–2
Time of possession	42:26	17:34

Team	Category	Player	Statistics
Utah	Passing	Isaac Wilson	17/29, 207 yards, 1 TD, 2 INT
Utah	Rushing	Micah Bernard	25 carries, 182 yards
Utah	Receiving	Dorian Singer	7 receptions, 95 yards
Oklahoma State	Passing	Alan Bowman	16/33, 206 yards, 2 TD's 2 INT
Oklahoma State	Rushing	Ollie Gordon	11 carries, 42 yards
Oklahoma State	Receiving	De'Zhaun Stribling	3 receptions, 50 yards

=== vs Arizona ===
Game Five – Arizona Wildcats (2–1) vs No. 10 Utah Utes (4–0) – Game summary

Quarter	1	2	3	4	Total
Wildcats	3	7	6	7	23
No. 10 Utes	0	3	0	7	10

at Rice-Eccles Stadium • Salt Lake City, UT

- Date: September 28, 2024
- Game time: 8:15 p.m.
- Game weather: Sunny, 81 °F (27 °C)
- Game attendance: 52,898
- Referee: David Alvarez
- TV announcers (ESPN): Dave Flemming (play-by-play), Brock Osweiler (analyst), and Stormy Buonantony (sideline reporter)

Game information

First quarter

- (1:48) ARIZ – Tyler Loop 47-yard field goal (Drive: 9 plays, 60 yards, 4:51; Arizona 3–0)

Second quarter

- (6:56) UTAH – Cole Becker 23-yard field goal (Drive: 6 plays, 48 yards, 2:57; Tied 3–3)
- (3:17) ARIZ – Jeremiah Patterson 3-yard pass from Noah Fifita, Tyler Loop kick (Drive: 7 plays, 75 yards, 3:39; Arizona 10–3)

Third quarter

- (7:36) ARIZ – Tyler Loop 53-yard field goal (Drive: 10 plays, 58 yards, 4:34; Arizona 13–3)
- (6:33) ARIZ – Tyler Loop 33-yard field goal (Drive: 4 plays, 3 yards, 0:54; Arizona 16–3)

Fourth quarter

- (11:54) UTAH – Caleb Lohner 20-yard pass from Isaac Wilson, Cole Becker kick (Drive: 6 plays, 80 yards, 2:59; Arizona 16–10)
- (8:13) ARIZ – Keyan Burnett 35-yard pass from Noah Fifita, Tyler Loop kick (Drive: 8 plays, 87 yards, 3:31; Arizona 23–10)

Statistics	ARIZ	UTAH
First downs	17	19
Total yards	358	364
Rushing yards	161	84
Passing yards	197	280
Passing: Comp–Att–Int	19–31–1	20–40–2
Time of possession	27:55	31:55

Team	Category	Player	Statistics
Arizona	Passing	Noah Fifita	19/31, 197 yards, 2 TD, INT
Arizona	Rushing	Kedrick Reescano	7 carries, 73 yards
Arizona	Receiving	Kenyan Burnett	5 receptions, 76 yards, TD
Utah	Passing	Isaac Wilson	20/40, 280 yards, TD, 2 INT
Utah	Rushing	Micah Bernard	16 carries, 91 yards
Utah	Receiving	Dorian Singer	9 receptions, 155 yards

=== at Arizona State ===
No. 16 Utah Utes (4–1) at Arizona State Sun Devils (4–1) – Game summary

Quarter	1	2	3	4	Total
No. 16 Utes	6	3	7	3	19
Sun Devils	6	7	7	7	27

at Mountain America Stadium • Tempe, AZ

- Date: October 11, 2024
- Game time: 7:30 p.m. MST
- Game weather: Sunny • Temperature: 91 °F (33 °C) • Wind: NW at 4 miles per hour (6.4 km/h)
- Game attendance: 45,310
- Referee: Henry Johns
- TV announcers (ESPN): Anish Shroff (play-by-play), Andre Ware (analyst), and Paul Carcaterra (sideline reporter)

Game information

First quarter

- (9:57) UTAH – Cole Becker 48-yard field goal (Drive: 12 plays, 46 yards, 5:03; Utah 3–0)
- (7:12) UTAH – Cole Becker 40-yard field goal (Drive: 4 plays, 6 yards, 1:32; Utah 6–0)
- (2:04) ASU – Jordyn Tyson 26-yard pass from Sam Leavitt (Drive: 11 plays, 81 yards, 5:05; Tied 6–6)

Second quarter

- (8:38) ASU – Jeff Sims 2-yard run, Ian Hershey kick (Drive: 13 plays, 72 yards, 7:27; Arizona State 13–6)
- (0:23) UTAH – Cole Becker 29-yard field goal (Drive: 11 plays, 60 yards, 1:25; Arizona State 13–9)

Third quarter

- (3:18) UTAH – Micah Bernard 6-yard run, Cole Becker kick (Drive: 12 plays, 79 yards, 7:05; Utah 16–13)
- (1:32) ASU – Cam Skattebo 50-yard run, Ian Hershey kick (Drive: 4 plays, 75 yards, 1:47; Arizona State 20–16)

Fourth quarter

- (5:42) UTAH – Cole Becker 46-yard field goal (Drive: 6 plays, 2 yards, 3:09; Arizona State 20–19)
- (2:41) ASU – Cam Skattebo 47-yard run, Ian Hershey kick (Drive: 5 plays, 75 yards, 3:01; Arizona State 27–19)

Statistics	UTAH	ASU
First downs	22	15
Total yards	349	343
Rushing yards	140	176
Passing yards	209	167
Passing: Comp–Att–Int	16–37–3	11–18–1
Time of possession	32:29	27:31

Team	Category	Player	Statistics
Utah	Passing	Cam Rising	16/37, 209 yards, 3 INT
Utah	Rushing	Micah Bernard	21 carries, 129 yards, TD
Utah	Receiving	Dorian Singer	4 receptions, 75 yards
Arizona State	Passing	Sam Leavitt	11/18, 154 yards, TD, INT
Arizona State	Rushing	Cam Skattebo	22 carries, 158 yards, 2 TD
Arizona State	Receiving	Jordyn Tyson	5 receptions, 84 yards, TD

=== vs TCU ===
TCU Horned Frogs (3–3) vs Utah Utes (4–2) – Game summary

Quarter	1	2	3	4	Total
Horned Frogs	0	10	3	0	13
Utes	0	0	7	0	7

at Rice-Eccles Stadium • Salt Lake City, UT

- Date: October 19, 2024
- Game time: 8:30 p.m.
- Game weather: Sunny • Temperature: 49 °F (9 °C) • Wind: NE 4 miles per hour (6.4 km/h)
- Game attendance: 53,299
- Referee: Mike McCabe
- TV announcers (ESPN): Dave Flemming (play-by-play), Brock Osweiler (analyst), and Sherree Burruss (sideline reporter)

Game information

First quarter

No scoring plays

Second quarter

- (13:29) TCU – Kyle Lemmermann 23-yard field goal (Drive: 9 plays, 66 yards, 3:00; TCU 3–0)
- (7:00) TCU – Josh Hoover 1-yard run, Kyle Lemmermann kick (Drive: 8 plays, 79 yards, 3:51; TCU 10–0)

Third quarter

- (9:32) TCU – Kyle Lemmermann 28-yard field goal (Drive: 8 plays, 42 yards, 3:26; TCU 13–0)
- (6:12) UTAH – Money Parks 71-yard pass from Isaac Wilson, Cole Becker kick (Drive: 3 plays, 82 yards, 1:27; TCU 13–7)

Fourth quarter

No scoring plays

Statistics	TCU	UTAH
First downs	20	12
Total yards	395	267
Rushing yards	132	68
Passing yards	263	199
Passing: Comp–Att–Int	22–41–0	17–33–1
Time of possession	30:55	29:05

Team	Category	Player	Statistics
TCU	Passing	Josh Hoover	22/41, 263 yards
TCU	Rushing	Savion Williams	7 carries, 72 yards
TCU	Receiving	Eric McAlister	2 receptions, 57 yards
Utah	Passing	Isaac Wilson	17/33, 199 yards, TD, INT
Utah	Rushing	Micah Bernard	13 carries, 55 yards
Utah	Receiving	Money Parks	3 receptions, 79 yards, TD

=== at Houston ===
Utah Utes (4–3) at Houston Cougars (2–5) – Game summary

Quarter	1	2	3	4	Total
Utes	7	0	7	0	14
Cougars	0	7	0	10	17

at TDECU Stadium • Houston, TX

- Date: October 26, 2024
- Game time: 5:00 p.m.
- Game weather: Clear • Temperature: 85 °F (29 °C) • Wind: SE 9 miles per hour (14 km/h)
- Game attendance: 28,251
- Referee: Luke Richmond
- TV announcers (ESPN+): Richard Cross (play-by-play), Barrett Brooks (analyst), and Tori Petry (sideline)

Game information

First quarter

- (12:28) UTAH – Brant Kuithe 71-yard pass from Isaac Wilson, Cole Becker kick (Drive: 2 plays, 72 yards, 0:47; Utah 7–0)

Second quarter

- (11:54) HOU – Stephon Johnson 21-yard pass from Zeon Chriss, Jack Martin kick (Drive: 3 plays, 23 yards, 1:34; Tied 7–7)

Third quarter

- (5:01) UTAH – Micah Bernard 14-yard run, Cole Becker kick (Drive: 3 plays, 22 yards, 0:56; Utah 14–7)

Fourth quarter

- (8:29) HOU – Joseph Manjack IV 28-yard pass from Zeon Chriss, Jack Martin kick (Drive: 10 plays, 85 yards, 5:43; Tied 14–14)
- (0:00) HOU – Jack Martin 43-yard field goal (Drive: 9 plays, 29 yards, 1:55; Houston 17–14)

Statistics	UTAH	HOU
First downs	12	16
Total yards	306	289
Rushing yards	90	228
Passing yards	216	61
Passing: Comp–Att–Int	20–37–1	6–13–1
Time of possession	28:58	31:02

Team	Category	Player	Statistics
Utah	Passing	Isaac Wilson	13/22, 171 yards, TD
Utah	Rushing	Micah Bernard	14 carries, 51 yards, TD
Utah	Receiving	Brant Kuithe	5 receptions, 113 yards, TD
Houston	Passing	Zeon Chriss	6/13, 61 yards, 2 TD, INT
Houston	Rushing	J'Marion Burnette	8 carries, 81 yards
Houston	Receiving	Joseph Manjack IV	1 reception, 28 yards, TD

=== vs No. 9 BYU (Holy War) ===
No. 9 BYU Cougars (8–0) vs Utah Utes (4–4) – Game summary

Quarter	1	2	3	4	Total
No. 9 Cougars	3	7	3	9	22
Utes	0	21	0	0	21

at Rice-Eccles Stadium • Salt Lake City, UT

- Date: November 9, 2024
- Game time: 8:15 p.m.
- Game weather: 0 °F (−18 °C)
- Game attendance: 54,383
- TV announcers (ESPN): Dave Flemming (play-by-play), Brock Osweiler (analyst), and Stormy Buonantony (sideline reporter)

Game information

First quarter
Second quarter
Third quarter
Fourth quarter

Statistics	BYU	UTAH
First downs	20	15
Total yards	339	259
Rushing yards	120	147
Passing yards	219	112
Passing: Comp–Att–Int	15–33–0	12–22–2
Time of possession	29:50	30:10

Team	Category	Player	Statistics
BYU	Passing	Jake Retzlaff	15/33, 219 yards
BYU	Rushing	LJ Martin	11 carries, 68 yards
BYU	Receiving	Chase Roberts	6 receptions, 91 yards
Utah	Passing	Brandon Rose	12/21, 112 yards, 2 TD, INT
Utah	Rushing	Micah Bernard	17 carries, 78 yards
Utah	Receiving	Dorian Singer	5 receptions, 76 yards

=== at No. 17 Colorado (Rumble in the Rockies) ===
Utah Utes (4–5) at No. 17 Colorado Buffaloes (7–2) – Game summary

Quarter	1	2	3	4	Total
Utes	3	6	7	8	24
No. 17 Buffaloes	14	7	7	21	49

at Folsom Field • Boulder, CO

- Date: November 16, 2024
- Game time: 10:00 a.m.
- Game weather: Sunny, 50 °F (10 °C)
- Game attendance: 54,646
- Referee: Kevin Boltmann
- TV announcers (FOX): Gus Johnson (play-by-play), Joel Klatt (analyst), and Jenny Taft (sideline)

Game information

First quarter

- (10:08) UTAH – Cole Becker 32-yard field goal (Drive: 7 plays, 7 yards, 4:44; Utah 3–0)
- (7:51) COLO – Will Sheppard 40-yard pass from Shedeur Sanders, Alejandro Mata kick (Drive: 5 plays, 58 yards, 2:09; Colorado 7–3)
- (5:49) COLO – LaJohntay Wester 76-yard kickoff return, Alejandro Mata kick (Drive: 0 plays, 0 yards, 0:00; Colorado 14–3)

Second quarter

- (5:35) UTAH – Cole Becker 34-yard field goal (Drive: 4 plays, 7 yards, 1:44; Colorado 14–6)
- (0:49) COLO – Will Sheppard 6-yard pass from Shedeur Sanders, Alejandro Mata kick (Drive: 14 plays, 85 yards, 4:40; Colorado 21–6)
- (0:00) UTAH – Cole Becker 47-yard field goal (Drive: 7 plays, 36 yards, 0:44; Colorado 21–9)

Third quarter

- (11:43) COLO – Isaiah Augustave 37-yard run, Alejandro Mata kick (Drive: 1 play, 37 yards, 0:08; Colorado 28–9)
- (6:10) UTAH – Dorian Singer 40-yard pass from Isaac Wilson, Cole Becker kick (Drive: 1 play, 40 yards, 0:09; Colorado 28–16)

Fourth quarter

- (13:58) COLO – Drelon Miller 47-yard pass from Shedeur Sanders, Alejandro Mata kick (Drive: 7 plays, 75 yards, 2:44; Colorado 35–16)
- (8:34) UTAH – Caleb Lohner 3-yard pass from Isaac Wilson, Spencer Fano run for two-point conversion (Drive: 8 plays, 75 yards, 5:24; Colorado 35–24)
- (4:32) COLO – Charlie Offerdahl 4-yard run, Alejandro Mata kick (Drive: 5 plays, 63 yards, 1:22; Colorado 42–24)
- (2:22) COLO – Travis Hunter 5-yard run, Alejandro Mata kick (Drive: 2 plays, 19 yards, 0:50; Colorado 49–24)

Statistics	UTAH	COLO
First downs	15	17
Total yards	272	405
Rushing yards	31	65
Passing yards	241	340
Passing: Comp–Att–Int	22–41–3	30–41–1
Time of possession	35:38	23:55

Team	Category	Player	Statistics
Utah	Passing	Isaac Wilson	21/40, 236 yards, 2 TD, 3 INT
Utah	Rushing	Mike Mitchell	7 carries, 28 yards
Utah	Receiving	Carsen Ryan	4 receptions, 78 yards
Colorado	Passing	Shedeur Sanders	30/41, 340 yards, 3 TD, INT
Colorado	Rushing	Isaiah Augustave	7 carries, 59 yards
Colorado	Receiving	Drelon Miller	6 receptions, 108 yards, TD

=== vs No. 22 Iowa State ===
No. 22 Iowa State Cyclones (8–2) vs Utah Utes (4–6) – Game summary

Quarter	1	2	3	4	Total
No. 22 Cyclones	7	10	7	7	31
Utes	3	10	0	15	28

at Rice-Eccles Stadium • Salt Lake City, UT

- Date: November 23, 2024
- Game time: 5:30 p.m.
- Game weather: Cloudy, 50 °F (10 °C), SW 7 mph
- Game attendance: 52,152
- Referee: David Alvarez
- TV announcers (FOX): Chris Myers (play-by-play) and Robert Smith (analyst)

Game information

First quarter

- (9:52) UU - Becker, Cole 34 yd field goal (Drive: 7 plays, 64 yards, 4:09; UU 3–0)
- (3:52) ISU - Higgins, Jayden 7 yd pass from Becht, Rocco (Konrardy, Kyle kick) (Drive: 13 plays, 75 yards, 6:00; ISU 7–3)

Second quarter

- (11:53) UU - Barton, Lander 87 yd interception (Becker, Cole kick) (UU 10–7)
- (8:05) ISU - Hansen, Carson 8 yd run (Konrardy, Kyle kick) (Drive: 9 plays, 75 yards, 3:48; ISU 14–10)
- (3:32) UU - Becker, Cole 47 yd field goal (Drive: 4 plays, -12 yards, 2:25; ISU 14–13)
- (0:29) ISU - Konrardy, Kyle 35 yd field goal (Drive: 7 plays, 58 yards, 3:03; ISU 17–13)

Third quarter

- (5:02) ISU - Becht, Rocco 1 yd run (Konrardy, Kyle kick) (Drive: 8 plays, 23 yards, 3:51; ISU 24–13)

Fourth quarter

- (14:41) UU - Washington, David 0 yd punt return (Lohner, Caleb pass) (ISU 24–21)
- (5:51) UU - Bernard, Micah 1 yd run (Becker, Cole kick) (Drive: 10 plays, 91 yards, 6:24; UU 2824)
- (1:31) ISU - Hansen, Carson 3 yd run (Konrardy, Kyle kick) (Drive: 10 plays, 75 yards, 4:20; ISU 31–28)

Statistics	ISU	UTAH
First downs	25	9
Total yards	405	224
Rushing yards	123	95
Passing yards	282	129
Passing: Comp–Att–Int	21–39–1	13–17–0
Time of possession	35:54	24:06

Team	Category	Player	Statistics
Iowa State	Passing	Rocco Becht	20/38, 256 yards, TD, INT
Iowa State	Rushing	Carson Hansen	14 carries, 57 yards, 2 TD
Iowa State	Receiving	Jayden Higgins	9 receptions, 155 yards, TD
Utah	Passing	Isaac Wilson	8/8, 74 yards
Utah	Rushing	Luke Bottari	4 carries, 47 yards
Utah	Receiving	Daidren Zipperer	4 receptions, 66 yards

=== at UCF ===
Utah Utes (4–7) at UCF Knights (4–7) – Game summary

Quarter	1	2	3	4	Total
Utes	3	10	0	15	28
Knights	0	7	0	7	14

at FBC Mortgage Stadium • Orlando, FL

- Date: November 29, 2024
- Game time: 6:00 p.m. MST
- Game weather: Sunny, 71 °F (22 °C)
- Game attendance: 40,747
- Referee: Cravonne Barrett
- TV announcers (FOX): Trent Rush (play-by-play) and Robert Smith (analyst)

Game information

First quarter

- (6:52) UTAH – Cole Becker 37-yard field goal. Drive: 6 plays, 27 yards, 2:42; UTAH 3–0

Second quarter

- (7:45) UTAH – Zemaiah Vaughn 60-yard interception return (Trey Coleman kick). UTAH 10–0
- (3:25) UCF – RJ Harvey 5-yard run (Grant Reddick kick). Drive: 10 plays, 89 yards, 4:17; UTAH 10–7
- (1:17) UTAH – Trey Coleman 24-yard field goal. Drive: 7 plays, 61 yards, 2:00; UTAH 13–7

Third quarter

- No scoring plays

Fourth quarter

- (14:46) UTAH – Landen King 15-yard pass from Luke Bottari (Bottari Pass to Micah Bernard for Two-Point Conversion). Drive: 9 plays, 49 yards, 5:04; UTAH 21–7
- (3:34) UTAH – Smith Snowden 13-yard interception return (Trey Coleman kick). UTAH 28–7
- (0:19) UCF – RJ Harvey 6-yard pass from EJ Colson (Grant Reddick kick). Drive: 14 plays, 75 yards, 3:15; UTAH 28–14

Statistics	UTAH	UCF
First downs	11	22
Total yards	196	379
Rushing yards	85	173
Passing yards	111	206
Passing: Comp–Att–Int	20–41–2	13–20–0
Time of possession	27:34	32:26

Team	Category	Player	Statistics
Utah	Passing	Luke Bottari	13/20, 111 yards, TD
Utah	Rushing	Micah Bernard	22 carries, 87 yards
Utah	Receiving	Zacharus Williams	6 receptions, 72 yards
UCF	Passing	Dylan Rizk	11/27, 118 yards, INT
UCF	Rushing	RJ Harvey	20 carries, 119 yards, TD
UCF	Receiving	Kobe Hudson	7 receptions, 79 yards

== Rankings ==
Ranking movements Legend: ██ Increase in ranking ██ Decrease in ranking — = Not ranked RV = Received votes
	Week																
Poll	Pre	1	2	3	4	5	6	7	8	9	10	11	12	13	14	15	Final
AP	12	11	12	12	10	18	16	RV	—	—	—	—	—	—	—	—	—
Coaches	13	11	10	10	10	18	17	RV	—	—	—	—	—	—	—	—	—
CFP	Not released										—	—	—	—	—	—	Not released

== Roster ==
2024 Utah Utes football team roster
Players
Coaches
Offense

Pos.	#	Name	Class
WR	0	Taeshaun Lyons	Fr
RB	1	Jaylon Glover	Jr
RB	2	Micah Bernard	Sr
WR	3	Dorian Singer	Sr
WR	4	Munir McClain	Sr
WR	6	Daidren Zipperer	Fr
QB	7	Cameron Rising	Sr
QB	8	Brandon Rose	So
WR	9	Damien Alford	Sr
WR	10	Money Parks	Sr
QB	11	Isaac Wilson	Fr
QB	13	Dallen Engemann	Jr
QB	14	Sam Huard	Sr
QB	15	Luke Bottari	Sr
WR	16	Diezel Kamoku	Fr
WR	17	Rayshawn Glover	So
WR	18	David Washington	Fr
WR	19	Luca Caldarella	Jr
WR	20	Jett Meine	So
RB	21	Mike Mitchell	Fr
RB	23	Dijon Stanley	So
RB	26	Charlie Vincent	Sr
WR	27	Cameron Mitchell	Fr
RB	28	Anthony Woods	Jr
RB	29	Laython Biddle	Fr
WR	30	Matt Clark	Fr
RB	32	Omar Shah	Fr
WR	37	Peyton Rice	Fr
WR	45	Kaimana Hanohano	So
OL	52	Michael Mokofisi	Jr
OL	53	Johnny Maea	Sr
OL	55	Spencer Fano	So
OL	59	Falcon Kaumatule	Sr
OL	60	Shintaro Mann	Sr
OL	61	Kamilo Raass	Fr
OL	62	Solatao Moeai	So
OL	63	Lukas Jackson	Fr
OL	64	Reece Parmenter	Fr
OL	66	Brennan Molina	Fr
OL	68	Jaren Kump	Jr
OL	70	Alma Taleni	Fr
OL	71	Caleb Lomu	Fr
OL	72	Isaiah Garcia	Fr
OL	73	Tanoa Togiai	Jr
OL	74	Keith Olson	So
OL	75	Roger Alderman	Fr
OL	76	Zereoue Williams	Jr
OL	79	Alex Harrison	Jr
TE	80	Brant Kuithe	Sr
TE	82	Landen King	Jr
TE	83	Miki Suguturaga	Sr
TE	84	Frankie Goodson	So
TE	84	Caleb Lohner	Sr
TE	85	Carsen Ryan	Jr
TE	86	CJ Jacobsen	Fr
TE	87	Spencer Clegg	Fr
TE	88	Dallen Bentley	Jr
TE	89	Justice Brusatto	Jr
WR	89	Zacharyus Williams	Fr

Defense

Pos.	#	Name	Class
DE	0	Logan Fano	So
CB	1	Kenan Johnson	Sr
CB	2	Smith Snowden	So
LB	3	Levani Damuni	Sr
LB	3	Johnathan Hall	So
CB	4	Cameron Calhoun	Fr
CB	5	Zemaiah Vaughn	Sr
CB	6	Sammie Hunter	Fr
DE	7	Van Fillinger	Sr
LB	8	Lander Barton	Jr
CB	9	Elijah Davis	So
S	11	Alaka'i Gilman	Sr
LB	12	Sione Fotu	So
S	13	Rabbit Evans	Jr
LB	14	Josh Calvert	Sr
S	15	Tao Johnson	So
CB	16	CJ Blocker	Fr
CB	17	Nasir Stephens	Fr
CB	18	Quimari Shemwell	Fr
LB	21	Karene Reid	Sr
LB	24	Moroni Anae	Jr
CB	25	Nick Howe	So
LB	27	Hunter Andrews	Fr
S	28	Jeilani Davis	Fr
CB	29	Isaiah Brown	Fr
CB	29	LaTristan Thompson	Fr
CB	30	John Randle Jr.	Fr
S	30	Carter Stembridge	Fr
S	31	Nate Ritchie	So
LB	32	Helaman Ofahengaue	So
LB	33	Kana'i Lopes	Fr
CB	34	Xane Uipi	Fr
DE	35	Elijah Elliss	Fr
LB	37	Trey Reynolds	So
S	39	Ben Durham	Fr
DE	40	Paul Fitzgerald	So
LB	41	Grady Mareko	Fr
S	42	Jackson Bennee	Fr
LB	44	Jaeden Bland	Fr
DE	45	Vili Taufatofua	So
DE	48	Alex Cloward	Fr
DT	49	Mike Tauteoli	Fr
DE	56	Ka'eo Akana	So
DT	57	Keanu Tanuvasa	So
DT	58	Junior Tafuna	Sr
DT	77	Simote Pepa	Jr
DE	81	Connor O'Toole	Sr
DE	90	John Henry Daley	Fr
DT	91	Jonah Lea'ea	Fr
DT	92	James LeBaron	So
DE	93	Kash Dillon	Fr
DT	94	Bobby Piland Jr.	Fr
DT	95	Aliki Vimahi	Sr
DT	96	Jori Benson	So
DT	98	Dallas Vakalahi	Fr
DT	99	Tevita Fotu	Sr

Special teams

Pos.	#	Name	Class
P	34	Jack Bouwmeester	Jr
K	36	Cole Becker	Sr
K	38	Trey Coleman	Fr
P	46	Elliot Janish	Jr
LS	50	J. T. Greep	Sr
LS	65	Logan Castor	So
K	97	Joey Cheek	So

Head coach

- Kyle Whittingham

Coordinators/assistant coaches

- Morgan Scalley – Defensive coordinator/safeties
- Andy Ludwig – Offensive coordinator/quarterbacks (first 7 weeks)
- Jim Harding – Assistant head coach/offensive line
- Sharrieff Shah – Special teams coordinator/cornerbacks
- Freddie Whittingham – Recruiting coordinator/tight ends
- Lewis Powell – Defensive ends
- Luther Elliss – Defensive tackles
- Colton Swan – Linebackers
- Quinton Ganther – Running backs
- Alvis Whitted – Wide receivers
- Maxwell Cotton – Offensive graduate assistant
- Kammy Delp – Offensive graduate assistant
- Chase Murdock – Defensive graduate assistant
- Mike Bajakian – Senior offensive analyst/quarterbacks
- Jordan Fogal – Defensive graduate assistant
- Ryan Blakney – Offensive analyst
- Vince Conti – Defensive analyst
- Jake Cookus – Senior special teams analyst/kickers & punters
- Dom Conti – Special teams analyst
- Adam Fry – Director, football operations
- Robert Blechen – General manager, personnel
- Sam Morrissette – Director, personnel coordinator
- Doug Elisaia – Director, strength and conditioning
- Quincy Watkins – Defensive quality control
- Jeff Rudy – Associate director for administration

Legend

- (C) Team captain
- (S) Suspended
- (I) Ineligible
- Injured
- Redshirt

Roster
