= Lee Hunter (American football) =

American football player (born 2002)

No. 92 – Carolina Panthers
- Position: Nose tackle
- Roster status: Active

Personal information
- Born: July 2, 2002 (age 24); Mobile, Alabama, U.S.
- Listed height: 6 ft 3 in (1.91 m)
- Listed weight: 315 lb (143 kg)

Career information
- High school: Mattie T. Blount (Eight Mile, Alabama)
- College: Auburn (2021); UCF (2022–2024); Texas Tech (2025)
- NFL draft: 2026: 2nd round, 49th overall pick

Career history
- Carolina Panthers (2026–present)

Awards and highlights
- First-team All-American (2025); First-team All-Big 12 (2025); Second-team All-Big 12 (2024)

Career NFL statistics as of Week 4, 2026
- Tackles: 11
- Stats at Pro Football Reference

Lee Hunter (born July 2, 2002) is an American professional football nose tackle for the Carolina Panthers of the National Football League (NFL). He played college football for the Auburn Tigers, UCF Knights and Texas Tech Red Raiders. Hunter was selected by the Panthers in the second round of the 2026 NFL draft.

== Early life ==
Hunter was born in Mobile, Alabama, where he grew up. He played football at Ben C. Rain High School as a freshman before transferring to Mattie T. Blount High School. As a junior at Blount, Hunter, playing as a defensive lineman, recorded 77 tackles, 23 tackles-for-loss (TFLs) and eight sacks. He then had 54 tackles, 20 TFLs and 4.5 sacks as a senior while helping Blount to the Class 6A quarterfinals, being selected first-team all-state for his performance. A four-star recruit and one of the top-100 prospects nationally, he committed to play college football for the Auburn Tigers.

== College career ==
Hunter redshirted as a true freshman at Auburn in 2021, seeing no playing time. He entered the NCAA transfer portal after the season, claiming that the team's players were treated "like dogs" under head coach Bryan Harsin. He transferred to the UCF Knights, playing in 13 games while recording 17 tackles during the 2022 season. Then, as a sophomore in 2023, he was named honorable mention All-Big 12 Conference after recording 69 tackles, 11 TFLs and three sacks. In 2024, he totaled 45 tackles, 9.5 TFLs and one sack while being named second-team All-Big 12. He transferred to the Texas Tech Red Raiders for his final season in 2025.

=== College statistics ===
Legend
**Bold**	Career high

Season	Team	GP	Solo	Ast	Tot	Loss	Sk	Pd	FF	FR	TD
2021	Auburn	0	Redshirt								
2022	UCF	**13**	9	8	17	1.0	1.0	0	0	0	0
2023	UCF	**13**	**38**	**31**	**69**	**11.0**	**3.0**	**1**	0	0	0
2024	UCF	12	19	26	45	9.5	1.0	0	0	0	0
2025	Texas Tech	12	10	20	30	7.5	2.5	0	**1**	0	0
Total		50	76	85	161	29.0	7.5	1	1	0	0

== Professional career ==
Pre-draft measurables
Height	Weight	Arm length	Hand span	Wingspan	40-yard dash	10-yard split	20-yard split	Vertical jump	Broad jump
6 ft 3 1/2 in (1.92 m)	318 lb (144 kg)	33 1/4 in (0.84 m)	9 1/4 in (0.23 m)	6 ft 8 3/4 in (2.05 m)	5.18 s	1.79 s	2.99 s	21.5 in (0.55 m)	8 ft 4 in (2.54 m)
All values from NFL Combine

Hunter was selected by the Carolina Panthers in the second round (49th overall) of the 2026 NFL draft.
