= James Evans (running back) =

American football player (1963–2015)

No. 41
- Position: Running back

Personal information
- Born: August 17, 1963; Prichard, Alabama, U.S.
- Died: November 19, 2015 (aged 52); Tampa, Florida, U.S.
- Listed height: 6 ft 0 in (1.83 m)
- Listed weight: 220 lb (100 kg)

Career information
- High school: Mattie T. Blount (Eight Mile, Alabama)
- College: Southern
- NFL draft: 1987: 10th round, 271st overall pick

Career history
- Kansas City Chiefs (1987); Tampa Bay Buccaneers (1988)*
- * Offseason or practice squad member only

Career NFL statistics
- Games played: 2
- Stats at Pro Football Reference

James Marcus Evans (August 17, 1963 – November 19, 2015) was an American professional football player.

Evans was one of 21 children born to Maxine Cade Evans. He graduated from Mattie T. Blount High School and Southern University. He was selected by the Kansas City Chiefs in the tenth round of the 1987 NFL draft and played two games that season. Evans later joined the Tampa Bay Buccaneers before retiring from the NFL.

Later, Evans wrote two books Power of Human Worth and I Have Worth…So Do You.

Evans was one of at least 345 NFL players to be diagnosed after death with chronic traumatic encephalopathy (CTE), which is caused by repeated hits to the head.
