= Karl Powe =

American football player (born 1962)

No. 81
- Position: Wide receiver

Personal information
- Born: January 17, 1962 (age 64); Mobile, Alabama, U.S.
- Listed height: 6 ft 2 in (1.88 m)
- Listed weight: 175 lb (79 kg)

Career information
- High school: Mattie T. Blount (Eight Mile, Alabama)
- College: Alabama State
- NFL draft: 1985: 7th round, 178th overall pick

Career history
- Dallas Cowboys (1985–1987); Green Bay Packers (1988)*
- * Offseason or practice squad member only

Career NFL statistics
- Receptions: 14
- Receiving yards: 237
- Stats at Pro Football Reference

Karl Alonzo Powe (born January 17, 1962) is an American former professional football player who was a wide receiver in the National Football League (NFL) for the Dallas Cowboys. He played college football for the Alabama State Hornets.

== Early life ==
Powe attended Mattie T. Blount High School, where he lettered in football, basketball, track and baseball. He accepted a football scholarship from Alabama State University.

Although he was considered the fastest player on the team, he spent most of his career as a backup wide receiver, because he chose to compete on the Alabama State Hornets track and field team instead of participating in spring football practice. He practiced the 100 and 200 metres.

As a sophomore in 1982, he led the team in receiving with 16 catches for 319 yards and 2 touchdowns, including a 61-yard touchdown reception and a 53-yard catch. As a junior in 1983, he posted 8 receptions for 184 yards and 2 touchdowns (62 yards and 48 yards).

As a senior, he registered 16 receptions for 314 yards and 2 touchdowns, while leading the Southwestern Athletic Conference in kickoff returns with 11 for 300 yards and a 27.3 average. In three seasons he recorded 40 receptions for 817 yards and 6 touchdowns, averaging 20.5 yards per catch.

== Professional career ==
=== Dallas Cowboys ===
Powe was selected by the Dallas Cowboys in the seventh round (178th overall) of the 1985 NFL draft, because of his speed and athletic ability. He made the team as a backup wide receiver after having a notable camp. On December 15, he had a critical 28-yard reception on a third-and-15 situation in the fourth quarter against the New York Giants, which proved to be the winning touchdown drive that clinched the division-title.

He started the season finale against the San Francisco 49ers in place of Tony Hill, posting 7 receptions for 127 yards. He finished the season with 14 receptions for 237 yards and a 16.9-yard average. He was seen as a promising player, as his 14 catches were the most by a Cowboys rookie receiver since Drew Pearson's 22 in 1973.

On September 9, 1986, he was placed on the injured reserve list, after suffering nerve damage in his neck during the season opener against the New York Giants.

On September 1, 1987, he was placed on the injured reserve list with a sprained shoulder. After the players went on a strike on the third week of the 1987 season, those contests were canceled (reducing the 16-game season to 15) and the NFL decided that the games would be played with replacement players. On October 7, he crossed the picket line and joined the replacement team. It was later reported that Powe was told by the Cowboys to resign from the NFL Players Association in order to receive physical therapy. He was cut on October 20, at the end of the strike, after not being able to fully recover from his previous injuries. He never played during the season.

=== Green Bay Packers ===
On April 23, 1988, he was signed as a free agent by the Green Bay Packers. He was released before the start of the season, after leaving training camp on July 19.

== Coaching career ==
After his retirement, Powe became the offensive coordinator at Mattie T. Blount High School in Eight Mile, Alabama.
