= Mattie T. Blount High School =

Location
- 5450 Lott Rd; Eight Mile, Alabama 36613; United States; 30°46′46″N 88°10′44″W

Information
- Type: Public
- School district: Mobile County Public School System
- Superintendent: Chresal Threadgill
- CEEB code: 012233
- Principal: Collin Jerome Woods
- Teaching staff: 59.00 (FTE)
- Enrollment: 1,105 (2023–2024)
- Student to teacher ratio: 18.73
- Colors: Purple and white
- Nickname: Leopards
- Website: www.blountleopards.com

Mattie Thomas Blount High School is one of 16 high schools in the Mobile County Public School System. It is located in Eight Mile and in unincorporated Mobile County, Alabama.

It serves portions of Prichard. It is named for administrator Mattie Thomas Blount. As of 2022, 96 percent of the student body is African American. It had about 1,160 students. The school colors are purple and white and leopards are the mascot. It has won several championships in football and several players have gone on to the NFL.

== Feeder patterns ==
The following middle schools feed into Blount High School :

Portions of the attendance zone:

- Chastang Middle School
- Scarborough Middle School
- Semmes Middle School

== Athletics ==
Blount's athletic teams plays in the Alabama High School Athletic Association Class 6A Region One. The nickname for the athletic teams is the "Leopards".

In 2022, members of the football team were getting baptized together and the team was receiving visits from a local pastor.

== Notable alumni ==
- Derrick Burroughs, former NFL player
- Larry Cowan, former NFL player
- Dameyune Craig, former Auburn quarterback and NFL player, current Texas A&M wide receivers' coach
- James Evans, former NFL player
- Lee Hunter, college football defensive tackle
- Alonzo Johnson, former NFL player
- Charlie Parker, former NFL and CFL player
- Karl Powe, former NFL player
- Sims Stokes, former NFL player
- Kadarius Toney, NFL player for the Kansas City Chiefs and Rapper
- Sherman Williams, former NFL player
- Kennedy Winston, professional basketball player
