= Sims Stokes =

American football player (born 1944)

No. 31, 84
- Position: Wide receiver

Personal information
- Born: April 18, 1944 (age 82); Mobile, Alabama, U.S.
- Listed height: 6 ft 1 in (1.85 m)
- Listed weight: 197 lb (89 kg)

Career information
- High school: Mattie T. Blount (AL)
- College: Kansas (1962-1965); Northern Arizona (1966)
- NFL draft: 1967: 6th round, 157th overall pick

Career history
- Dallas Cowboys (1967); → Oklahoma City Plainsmen (1967); Atlanta Falcons (1968)*; Detroit Lions (1968)*; Dallas Cowboys (1968)*; → Oklahoma City Plainsmen (1968)
- * Offseason or practice squad member only

Career NFL statistics
- Return yards: 92
- Stats at Pro Football Reference

Sims Edward Stokes III (born April 18, 1944) is an American former professional football player who was a wide receiver for the Dallas Cowboys of the National Football League (NFL). He played college football for the Northern Arizona Lumberjacks.

== Early life ==
Stokes attended Mattie T. Blount High School, where he practiced football and track. He played quarterback for 3 seasons under his uncle Hubert Stokes. He threw passes both left and right handed, mostly on a rollout from a Winged-T formation.

He accepted a football scholarship from the University of Kansas. As sophomore in 1964, he was a backup running back, on a roster where the starter was Gale Sayers.

As a junior in 1965, he was moved to split end to replace an injured Willie Ray Smith, leading the team with 25 receptions for 271 yards, while adding one receiving touchdown and 16 carries for 34 yards. Against the University of Arizona, he set the school and tied the Big Eight Conference single game receiving record with 9 catches, totaling 139 yards.

As a senior, he transferred to Northern Arizona University, where he was named the starter at wide receiver. He posted 37 receptions for 271 yards and 2 touchdowns. He also led the nation with a kickoff return average of 37.6 yards on 12 returns. He had 2 kickoffs returns for 96 yards (against Weber State University and Long Beach State University).

== Professional career ==
Stokes was selected by the Dallas Cowboys in the sixth round (157th overall) of the 1967 NFL/AFL draft. As a rookie, he was tried at both wide receiver and defensive back. He was waived on September 11 and assigned to the Oklahoma City Plainsmen of the Professional Football League of America (PFLA) on September 14. He tallied 16 receptions for 660 yards, 10 touchdowns and led the League in kickoff returns, including a 94-yard return for a touchdown. He returned at the end of the NFL regular season. He appeared in the last 3 games, where he had 4 kickoff returns for 92 yards (23-yard avg.).

On September 4, 1968, he was waived by the Cowboys. On September 4, he was claimed off waivers by the Atlanta Falcons. On September 6, he was traded to the Detroit Lions. He was released on September 10. He was re-signed by the Dallas Cowboys and assigned once again to the Oklahoma City Plainsmen of the Professional Football League of America (PFLA). In October, he was signed to the Cowboys taxi squad. He was released during the season.
