= Chickasabogue Park =

Park in Mobile County, Alabama

- Interactive map of Chickasabogue Park
- Type: County park
- Location: Eight Mile, Alabama
- Area: 1,100 acres (450 ha)
- Operator: Mobile County Public Works
- Website: Official website

Chickasabogue Park is an 1,100-acre (450 ha) park in Eight Mile, Mobile County, Alabama. The park contains campgrounds, around 17 miles (27 km) of hiking and biking trails, a disc golf course, sports fields, boat launches, and a beach on Chickasabogue Creek. It is linked via Chickasabogue Creek to the town of Chickasaw and Mobile Bay. The park also contains a museum featuring Native American, Colonial, and plantation-era artifacts, housed in a former African Methodist Episcopal church built in 1879.

== History ==
The earliest known inhabitants of the park were Woodland period Native Americans around 1500 BCE. Jean-Baptiste Le Moyne de Bienville, founder of Mobile, relocated Apalache tribe members along Chickasabogue Creek. The first European settlement came in 1787, when Spaniard Don Diego Miguel Álvarez was granted land there. Frederic Daniel Myers and his sons built a saw mill along the creek as early as 1843. The plantation came to encompass a grist mill, a brick kiln, rice, corn, and livestock fields, and a town which contained a public school. In the final months of the Civil War, around 700 residents of Whistler hid in the area to escape advancing Union troops. The area was used as a recreation area as early as the 1930s. The Myers family sold the property in 1903. The land was later purchased by Scott Paper Company, who donated the original 750 acres (300 ha) to the county in 1969.
