= Kobe Hudson =

American football player (born 2001)

Profile
- Position: Wide receiver

Personal information
- Born: September 11, 2001 (age 25); Pine Mountain, Georgia, U.S.
- Listed height: 6 ft 1 in (1.85 m)
- Listed weight: 193 lb (88 kg)

Career information
- High school: Troup County (LaGrange, Georgia)
- College: Auburn (2020–2021); UCF (2022–2024)
- NFL draft: 2025: undrafted

Career history
- Carolina Panthers (2025)*; Houston Gamblers (2026)*
- * Offseason or practice squad member only
- Stats at Pro Football Reference

Kobe Hudson (born September 11, 2001) is an American professional football wide receiver. He played college football for the Auburn Tigers and UCF Knights.

== Early life ==
Hudson attended Troup County High School in LaGrange, Georgia. He played wide receiver his freshman and sophomore years in high school before moving to quarterback as a junior. As a junior, he was the Georgia Class 4A state player of year and Region 5-AAAA player of year after passing for 3,386 yards and 38 touchdowns with 1,410 rushing yards and 18 touchdowns. Hudson was selected to play in the 2019 All-American Bowl. He committed to Auburn University to play college football.

== College career ==
Hudson played at Auburn in 2020 and 2021. After recording seven receptions for 70 yards as a true freshman in 2020, he was Auburn's leading receiver in 2021 with 44 receptions for 580 yards and four touchdowns. After the season he transferred to the University of Central Florida (UCF). In his first year at UCF, Hudson started 10 of 12 games, recording 39 receptions for 641 yards and seven touchdowns. He started 12 of 13 games in 2023, finishing with 44 receptions for 900 yards with eight touchdowns. Hudson returned to UCF as the teams number one receiver in 2024.

=== College statistics ===
Season	Team	Games		Receiving			
Season	Team	GP	GS	Rec	Yds	Avg	TD
2020	Auburn	11	0	7	70	10.0	0
2021	Auburn	12	5	44	580	13.2	4
2022	UCF	12	10	39	641	16.4	7
2023	UCF	13	12	44	900	20.5	8
2024	UCF	12	12	47	770	16.4	4
Career		60	39	181	2,961	16.4	23

== Professional career ==
Pre-draft measurables
Height	Weight	Arm length	Hand span	40-yard dash	10-yard split	20-yard split	20-yard shuttle	Three-cone drill	Vertical jump	Broad jump	Bench press
6 ft 0 3/4 in (1.85 m)	193 lb (88 kg)	30 5/8 in (0.78 m)	9 in (0.23 m)	4.57 s	1.54 s	2.69 s	4.40 s	7.20 s	35.0 in (0.89 m)	10 ft 2 in (3.10 m)	11 reps
All values from NFL Combine/Pro Day

=== Carolina Panthers ===
On May 8, 2025, Hudson signed with the Carolina Panthers as an undrafted free agent after going unselected in the 2025 NFL draft. He was waived on August 25.

=== Houston Gamblers ===
On February 1, 2026, Hudson signed with the Houston Gamblers of the United Football League (UFL). He was released on March 19.
