= Nyjalik Kelly =

American football player (born 2004)

No. 47 – Green Bay Packers
- Position: Outside linebacker
- Roster status: Practice squad

Personal information
- Born: October 29, 2004 (age 22); Fort Lauderdale, Florida, U.S.
- Listed height: 6 ft 5 in (1.96 m)
- Listed weight: 263 lb (119 kg)

Career information
- High school: Dillard (Fort Lauderdale)
- College: Miami (FL) (2022–2023); UCF (2024–2025)
- NFL draft: 2026: undrafted

Career history
- Green Bay Packers (2026–present)*
- * Offseason or practice squad member only
- Stats at Pro Football Reference

Nyjalik Kelly (born October 29, 2004) is an American professional football outside linebacker for the Green Bay Packers of the National Football League (NFL). He played college football for the Miami Hurricanes and UCF Knights.

== Early life ==
Kelly was born on October 29, 2004, in Fort Lauderdale, Florida. He attended Dillard High School in Fort Lauderdale where he played football as a defensive end. As a sophomore, he won the district championship and was named honorable mention All-Broward. He helped Dillard go undefeated in 2020 while recording 13 sacks and 21 tackles for loss (TFLs), then was named the Broward 8A-6A Football Defensive Player of the Year as a senior in 2021 when he recorded 58 tackles, 12 sacks and 20 TFLs. Kelly participated at the All-American Bowl at the end of his high school career. He was ranked a four-star recruit and one of the top 100 prospects nationally in the class of 2022. He initially committed to play college football for the Florida State Seminoles before de-committing. He later signed to play for the Miami Hurricanes.

== College career ==
As a true freshman at Miami in 2022, Kelly appeared in all 12 games and posted 11 tackles, 4.5 TFLs, four sacks and 15 pressures. He was limited by injuries in 2023 and recorded only eight tackles while starting three games. After the 2023 season, Kelly entered the NCAA transfer portal and transferred to the UCF Knights. In his first year with the Knights, he totaled 53 tackles, 5.5 sacks and three forced fumbles while earning honorable mention All-Big 12 Conference honors. In 2025, he posted 46 tackles, 7.5 TFLs, two forced fumbles and an interception while earning honorable mention All-Big 12 honors for a second time. Kelly declared for the 2026 NFL draft and was invited to the 2026 Senior Bowl.

== Professional career ==
Pre-draft measurables
Height	Weight	Arm length	Hand span	Wingspan	40-yard dash	10-yard split	20-yard split	20-yard shuttle	Three-cone drill	Vertical jump	Broad jump
6 ft 5 3/8 in (1.97 m)	256 lb (116 kg)	35 1/8 in (0.89 m)	10 3/8 in (0.26 m)	6 ft 10 1/2 in (2.10 m)	4.86 s	1.71 s	2.84 s	4.76 s	7.62 s	37.0 in (0.94 m)	9 ft 11 in (3.02 m)
All values from NFL Combine/Pro Day

Kelly was signed as an undrafted free agent by the Green Bay Packers after the conclusion of the 2026 NFL draft. On August 30, 2026, Kelly was released by the Packers as a part of final roster cuts. A day later, he was re–signed to the Packers' practice squad.
