= Dylan Rizk =

American football player

No. 10 – Stanford Cardinal
- Position: Quarterback
- Class: Redshirt Sophomore

Personal information
- Born: Delray Beach, Florida, U.S.
- Listed height: 6 ft 2 in (1.88 m)
- Listed weight: 225 lb (102 kg)

Career information
- High school: Cardinal Gibbons (Fort Lauderdale, Florida)
- College: UCF (2023–2024); Stanford (2025–present)
- Stats at ESPN

Dylan Rizk is an American college football quarterback for the Stanford Cardinal. He previously played for the UCF Knights.

== Early life ==
Rizk attended Cardinal Gibbons High School in Fort Lauderdale, Florida. He was rated as a three-star recruit and committed to play college football for the UCF Knights over offers from schools such as Indiana, Kentucky, Michigan State, and Northwestern.

== College career ==
=== UCF ===
As a freshman in 2023, Rizk appeared in just one game, where he went four for five passing for 28 yards, while also rushing twice for two yards. In week 9 of the 2024 season, he entered the game late into the fourth quarter and he completed six of his ten pass attempts for 102 yards and a touchdown, while also adding 31 yards on the ground versus BYU. Heading into week 10, Rizk was named the team's starting quarterback. In his first career start, he completed 20 of 25 passes for 294 yards and three touchdowns and rushed nine times for 55 yards in a blowout win over Arizona.

On April 9, 2025, Rizk announced that he would enter the transfer portal.

=== Stanford ===
On April 24, 2025, Rizk announced that he would transfer to Stanford.

=== Statistics ===
Season	Team	Games			Passing								Rushing			
Season	Team	GP	GS	Record	Comp	Att	Pct	Yards	Avg	TD	Int	Rate	Att	Yards	Avg	TD
2023	UCF	1	0	—	4	5	80.0	28	5.6	0	0	127.0	2	2	1.0	0
2024	UCF	6	4	1–3	72	117	61.5	904	7.7	5	2	137.1	29	43	1.5	0
2025	Stanford	0	0	—	Did not play											
Career		7	4	1–3	76	122	62.3	932	7.6	5	2	136.7	31	45	1.5	0
