= Tim Harris Jr. =

American football coach

Current position
- Title: Offensive coordinator
- Team: Florida State
- Conference: ACC

Biographical details
- Education: University of Miami (2009)

Coaching career (HC unless noted)
- 2009–2013: Booker T. Washington Senior High School (OC/QB/WR)
- 2014: Booker T. Washington Senior High School
- 2015–2019: FIU (RB)
- 2020: FIU (OC/RB)
- 2021–2022: UCF (co-OC/RB)
- 2023: Miami (RB)
- 2024: UCF (OC/WR)
- 2025: Florida State (PGC/WR)
- 2026–present: Florida State (OC/WR)

Tim Harris Jr. is an American football coach who is currently the offensive coordinator and wide receivers coach for the Florida State Seminoles.

== College career ==
Harris Jr. attended the University of Miami, where he was a four-time NCAA All-American on Miami's track and field team and a six-time Atlantic Coast Conference champion. He was also later inducted into the University of Miami Sports Hall of Fame.

== Coaching career ==
Harris Jr. got his first coaching job in 2009 as the offensive coordinator, wide receivers and quarterbacks coach at Booker T. Washington Senior High School. In 2014 he was promoted to the school's head coach. In 2015, Harris Jr. got his first college coaching job as the running backs coach at FIU. Ahead of the 2020 season, he was promoted to be FIU's offensive coordinator. Before the start of the 2021 season, he was hired at UCF as the team's co-offensive coordinator and running backs coach. For the 2023 season, Harris Jr. became the running backs coach at Miami Hurricanes. Heading into the 2024 season, he was hired as the offensive coordinator and wide receivers coach at UCF. For the 2025 season, Harris Jr. joined Florida State as the team's passing game coordinator and wide receivers coach. Ahead of the 2026 season, he was promoted to serve as the team's offensive coordinator, after Gus Malzahn retired.
