= RJ Harvey =

American football player (born 2001)

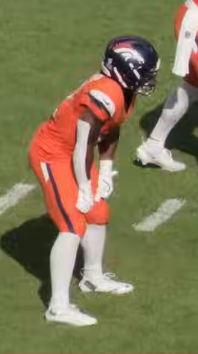
- Harvey with the Denver Broncos in 2025

No. 12 – Denver Broncos
- Positions: Running back, Kickoff returner
- Roster status: Injured reserve

Personal information
- Born: February 4, 2001 (age 25); Orlando, Florida, U.S.
- Listed height: 5 ft 8 in (1.73 m)
- Listed weight: 205 lb (93 kg)

Career information
- High school: Edgewater (College Park, Florida)
- College: Virginia (2019); UCF (2020–2024)
- NFL draft: 2025: 2nd round, 60th overall pick

Career history
- Denver Broncos (2025–present)

Awards and highlights
- Third-team All-American (2024); First-team All-Big 12 (2024)

Career NFL statistics as of Week 7, 2025
- Rushing yards: 627
- Rushing average: 3.7
- Rushing touchdowns: 8
- Receptions: 72
- Receiving yards: 573
- Receiving touchdowns: 6
- Return yards: 528
- Stats at Pro Football Reference

Robert "RJ" Harvey Jr. (born February 4, 2001) is an American professional football running back and kickoff returner for the Denver Broncos of the National Football League (NFL). He played college football for the UCF Knights. Harvey was selected by the Broncos in the second round of the 2025 NFL draft.

== Early life ==
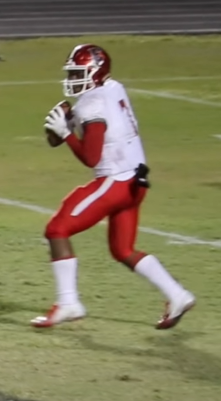
Harvey playing at Edgewater High School in 2018

Harvey was born in Orlando, Florida. He began playing football at age five. He attended Edgewater High School in Orlando and played three varsity football seasons as a dual-threat quarterback. Although the team lost every game in his sophomore year, he helped them rebound with a 9–3 record and district championship the following season. As a senior, Harvey threw for 42 touchdowns and 1,815 passing yards and ran for 1,350 yards and 22 scores as the team reached the state playoffs with a 12–2 record. He also maintained a 4.3 grade-point average (GPA) off the field. Harvey was ranked a three-star recruit and the 39th-best dual-threat quarterback nationally, committing to play college football for the Virginia Cavaliers.

== College career ==
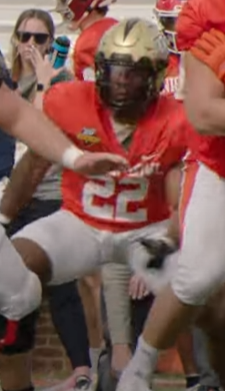
Harvey at the 2025 Senior Bowl

As a true freshman at the University of Virginia in 2019, Harvey was the third quarterback on the depth chart and redshirted, not seeing any playing time. He then entered the NCAA transfer portal and transferred to the UCF Knights. In 2020 at the University of Central Florida, after changing position to running back he appeared in five games and ran twice for three yards as a backup. He had a chance to be a starter entering the 2021 season, but suffered a torn ACL in preseason camp and missed the entire year.

Harvey returned in 2022 and appeared in 13 games with three starts, being named second-team All-American Athletic Conference (AAC) by Pro Football Network (PFN) while running 118 times for 796 yards and five touchdowns, in addition to 22 receptions for 215 yards. He entered the 2023 season as the team's top running back. Starting on October 7 against Kansas, he had five consecutive games with over 100 rushing yards, the longest streak at the school since 2007. Against 15th-ranked Oklahoma State, he ran for 206 yards and three touchdowns, helping UCF win 45–3 in an upset. He was named a semifinalist for the Doak Walker Award as best running back nationally and became the first UCF player to run for over 1,000 yards in a season since 2018. With 1,416 yards & 16 TDs, Harvey had the sixth-highest amount of running yards and rushing touchdowns in the nation.

=== Statistics ===
Year	Team	Games		Rushing				Receiving			
Year	Team	GP	GS	Att	Yards	Avg	TD	Rec	Yards	Avg	TD
2019	Virginia	Redshirt (redshirt)									
2020	UCF	2	0	3	3	1.0	0	0	0	0.0	0
2021	UCF	Did not play due to injury (ACL)									
2022	UCF	13	3	118	796	6.7	5	22	215	9.8	0
2023	UCF	13	10	226	1,416	6.3	16	19	238	12.5	1
2024	UCF	12	12	232	1,577	6.8	22	20	267	13.4	3
Career		40	25	579	3,792	6.5	43	61	720	11.8	4

== Professional career ==
Pre-draft measurables
Height	Weight	Arm length	Hand span	Wingspan	40-yard dash	10-yard split	20-yard split	20-yard shuttle	Vertical jump	Broad jump	Bench press
5 ft 8 in (1.73 m)	205 lb (93 kg)	29 in (0.74 m)	9 in (0.23 m)	5 ft 11 1/4 in (1.81 m)	4.40 s	1.57 s	2.55 s	4.34 s	38.0 in (0.97 m)	10 ft 7 in (3.23 m)	16 reps
All values from NFL Combine

Harvey was selected by the Denver Broncos in the second round (60th overall) in the 2025 NFL draft. On July 17, 2025, Harvey signed his four-year rookie contract.

=== 2025 season ===
Beginning the 2025 season as the Broncos' second-string running back behind J. K. Dobbins, Harvey served primarily as a pass-catching and change-of-pace back. He made his NFL debut during Week 1 against the Tennessee Titans, recording 70 rushing yards. Harvey scored his first career touchdown in Week 4 against the Cincinnati Bengals, in addition to recording 98 total yards from scrimmage in a 28–3 victory.

During Week 8 of the season, Harvey recorded 3 touchdowns, including a 40-yard touchdown run—the longest rushing touchdown scored by a Broncos player since 2021—in a 44–24 victory over the Dallas Cowboys. He was named the Week 8 NFL Rookie of the Week for his performance.

After Dobbins suffered a season-ending lisfranc injury in Week 10 against the Las Vegas Raiders, Harvey saw an increased role as the new starter. By the season's end, he totaled 540 yards and seven touchdowns rushing, 356 yards and five touchdowns receiving, as well as 353 yards returning kickoffs.

=== 2026 season ===
On June 15, 2026, it was announced that Harvey had undergone offseason surgery to repair a torn labrum in his shoulder, an injury suffered in the Broncos' AFC Championship Game loss to the New England Patriots.

On October 31, Harvey was placed on the injured reserve after suffering a knee injury during practice in Week 8.

== NFL career statistics ==
=== Regular season ===
Year	Team	Games		Rushing					Receiving					Kick returns					Fumbles	
Year	Team	GP	GS	Att	Yds	Avg	Lng	TD	Rec	Yds	Avg	Lng	TD	Ret	Yds	Avg	Lng	TD	Fmb	Lost
2025	DEN	17	7	146	540	3.7	50	7	47	356	7.6	32	5	16	353	22.1	29	0	1	1
2026	DEN	6	1	24	87	3.6	9	1	25	217	8.7	52	1	6	175	29.2	37	0	1	0
Career		23	8	170	627	3.7	50	8	72	573	8.0	52	6	22	528	24.0	37	0	2	1

=== Postseason ===
Year	Team	Games		Rushing					Receiving					Kick returns					Fumbles	
Year	Team	GP	GS	Att	Yds	Avg	Lng	TD	Rec	Yds	Avg	Lng	TD	Ret	Yds	Avg	Lng	TD	Fmb	Lost
2025	DEN	2	2	19	57	3.0	12	0	9	68	7.6	24	0	0	0	0.0	0	0	0	0
Career		2	2	19	57	3.0	12	0	9	68	7.6	24	0	0	0	0.0	0	0	0	0

== Personal life ==
Harvey is a cousin of professional boxer Roy Jones Jr.
