= Ladarius Tennison =

American gridiron football player (born 2001)

No. 27 – Edmonton Elks
- Position: Defensive back
- Roster status: Practice roster
- CFL status: American

Personal information
- Born: January 31, 2001 (age 25)
- Listed height: 5 ft 10 in (1.78 m)
- Listed weight: 200 lb (91 kg)

Career information
- High school: Rockledge (Rockledge, Florida)
- College: Auburn (2020–2021); Ole MIss (2022–2023); UCF (2024)
- NFL draft: 2025: undrafted

Career history
- Indianapolis Colts (2025)*; Edmonton Elks (2026–present)
- * Offseason or practice squad member only

Awards and highlights
- Grey Cup champion (2026)
- Stats at CFL.ca

Ladarius Stephan Tennison (born January 31, 2001) is an American professional football defensive back for the Edmonton Elks of the Canadian Football League (CFL). He played college football for the Auburn Tigers, Ole Miss Rebels and UCF Knights.

== Early life ==
Tennison was born on January 31, 2001. He attended Rockledge High School in Rockledge, Florida, where he played football and track and field. Tennison had 98 tackles with 24 for loss as a senior. He also played in the 2020 Under Armour All-America Game.

== College career ==
Tennison played college football for the Auburn Tigers from 2020 to 2021, Ole Miss Rebels from 2022 to 2023 and UCF Knights in 2024. At Auburn, he played in 23 games and recorded 43 tackles, including 4.5 for loss. After the 2021 season ended, Tennison entered the transfer portal. He then committed to Ole Miss. In two years at Ole Miss, Tennison registered 94 tackles, with 13.5 for loss, 2.5 sacks, two pass break ups, two fumble recoveries and one returned for a touchdown. He entered the transfer portal again at the end of the 2023 season and on January 12, 2024, committed to the University of Central Florida. Tennison appeared in 11 games, where he logged 32 tackles, including two for loss, one interception and two pass deflections.

== Professional career ==
Pre-draft measurables
Height	Weight	Arm length	Hand span	Wingspan	40-yard dash	10-yard split	20-yard split	20-yard shuttle	Three-cone drill	Vertical jump	Broad jump	Bench press
5 ft 9 in (1.75 m)	207 lb (94 kg)	29 1/4 in (0.74 m)	9 3/8 in (0.24 m)	6 ft 1/8 in (1.83 m)	4.63 s	1.58 s	2.64 s	4.48 s	7.40 s	32.5 in (0.83 m)	10 ft 0 in (3.05 m)	20 reps
All values from Pro day

=== Indianapolis Colts ===
After going unselected in the 2025 NFL draft, Tennison signed with the Indianapolis Colts as an undrafted free agent. On August 26, he was waived by the team.

=== Edmonton Elks ===
On January 28, 2026, Tennison signed the Edmonton Elks of the Canadian Football League (CFL). On May 31, 2026, he was assigned to the practice roster. On July 3, Tennison was elevated to the active roster and made his CFL debut the following day against the BC Lions. On July 7, he reverted to the practice roster. On October 23, Tennison was promoted again in a depth role. On October 28, he was moved to the reserve roster. On November 6, Tennison was re-signed to the practice roster.
