= Eight Mile, Alabama =

Unincorporated community in Alabama, United States

- Unincorporated community
- Location within Alabama Location within the United States
- Coordinates: 30°45′49″N 088°07′37″W
- Country: United States
- State: Alabama
- County: Mobile
- Elevation: 33 ft (10 m)
- Time zone: UTC-6 (Central (CST))
  - Summer (DST): UTC-5 (CDT)
- ZIP code: 36613
- Area code: 251
- GNIS ID: 117888

Eight Mile is an unincorporated community in Mobile County, Alabama, United States. The community is named for its distance from the city of Mobile. Part of it was annexed in the mid-20th century by the city of Prichard, Alabama.

== History ==
=== 2008 Mercaptan spill ===
In 2008, lightning struck a mercaptan storage tank at a Mobile Gas Service Corp. Underground natural gas pipeline at the Whistler Junction gas transfer facility within the Eight Mile community. An estimated 500 US gallons (1,900 L; 420 imp gal) of Mercaptan, the chemical odorant added to natural gas to help detect leaks, spilled into the soil and groundwater for six months, according to Alabama state environmental officials. It has migrated to ponds and surfaced, polluting the community's air.

Beginning in 2011, residents in Eight Mile began complaining of an overwhelming mercaptan odor and associated health problems. They have concerns about the damage to their health from the chemical, and to property values from its persistent rotten egg smell. They appealed for a state and federal investigation.

Mobile Gas officials maintained that the odor had nothing to do with their operations; they did not publicly acknowledge the leak or the lightning strike until April 2012. In subsequent court documents, Mobile Gas acknowledged the leak, but claimed the responsibility is with the waste cleanup firms they had hired to get rid of the spilled chemical. Sempra Energy acquired the Eight Mile facility several months after the accident and owned it until September 2016. Sempra Energy also owns the well that caused the massive 2015−16 Aliso Canyon gas leak in the Santa Susana Mountains and San Fernando Valley of Southern California.

In 2015 Mobile Gas started operating a new water pollution remediation ozone treatment process system. Mercaptan was federally reclassified as a hazardous chemical by the Frank R. Lautenberg Chemical Safety for the 21st Century Act, passed by Congress and signed by President Obama in 2016.

== Geography ==
Eight Mile is located west of Mobile Bay and just north of the Gulf of Mexico. The elevation is 33 feet (10 m). Chickasabogue Park is located in Eight Mile.

== Demographics ==
The mostly African-American enclave had a median income in 2014 of $35,000.

== Notable people ==
- Mikhail Torrance, professional basketball player, was born and grew up in Prichard.
- Kadarius Toney, professional football player.
