= 2024 BYU Cougars football team =

American college football season

2024 BYU Cougars football
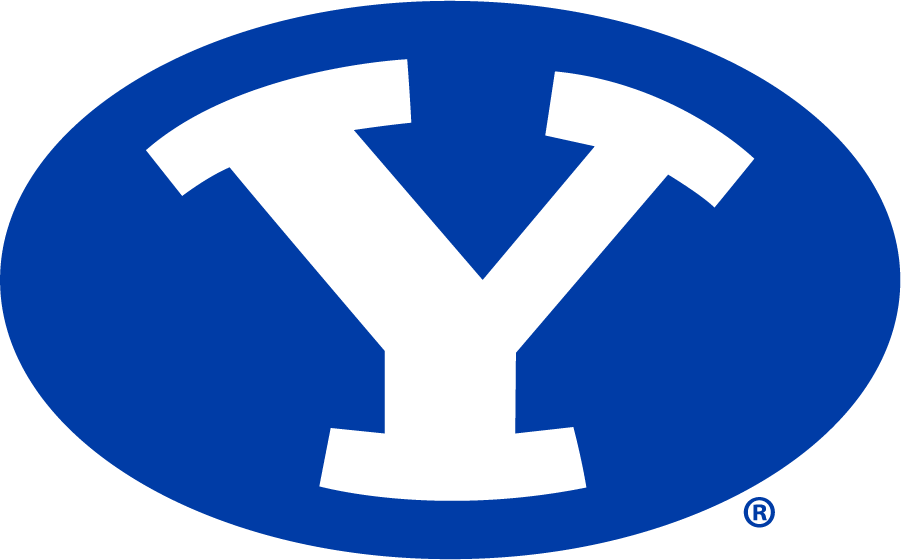

Alamo Bowl champion

Alamo Bowl, W 36–14 vs. Colorado
- Conference: Big 12 Conference

Ranking
- Coaches: No. 14
- AP: No. 13
- Record: 11–2 (7–2 Big 12)
- Head coach: Kalani Sitake (9th season)
- Offensive coordinator: Aaron Roderick (4th season)
- Offensive scheme: Power spread
- Defensive coordinator: Jay Hill (2nd season)
- Base defense: Multiple 4–3
- Home stadium: LaVell Edwards Stadium

Uniform

2024 Big 12 Conference football standings
| | Conf. | | | Overall |
| Team | W | | L | W | | L |
|---|---|---|---|---|---|---|
| No. 7 Arizona State y$^ | 7 | – | 2 | 11 | – | 3 |
| No. 15 Iowa State y | 7 | – | 2 | 11 | – | 3 |
| No. 13 BYU | 7 | – | 2 | 11 | – | 2 |
| No. 25 Colorado | 7 | – | 2 | 9 | – | 4 |
| Baylor | 6 | – | 3 | 8 | – | 5 |
| TCU | 6 | – | 3 | 9 | – | 4 |
| Texas Tech | 6 | – | 3 | 8 | – | 5 |
| Kansas State | 5 | – | 4 | 9 | – | 4 |
| West Virginia | 5 | – | 4 | 6 | – | 7 |
| Kansas | 4 | – | 5 | 5 | – | 7 |
| Cincinnati | 3 | – | 6 | 5 | – | 7 |
| Houston | 3 | – | 6 | 4 | – | 8 |
| Utah | 2 | – | 7 | 5 | – | 7 |
| UCF | 2 | – | 7 | 4 | – | 8 |
| Arizona | 2 | – | 7 | 4 | – | 8 |
| Oklahoma State | 0 | – | 9 | 3 | – | 9 |
Championship: Arizona State 45, Iowa State 19
^ – College Football Playoff participant; $ – Conference champion; y – Championship game participant; Rankings from AP Poll

The 2024 BYU Cougars football team represented Brigham Young University (BYU) as a member of the Big 12 Conference during the 2024 NCAA Division I FBS football season. The Cougars were led by ninth-year head coach Kalani Sitake and played their home games at LaVell Edwards Stadium.

== Offseason ==
=== Coaching changes ===
On November 28, 2023, it was announced that offensive line coach Darrell Funk and tight ends coach Steve Clark would not be retained. On December 21, 2023, TJ Woods was announced as the new offensive line coach and run game coordinator, followed on January 12, 2024, by Kevin M. Gilbride being announced as the new tight ends coach.

=== 2024 recruits ===
| Name | Pos. | Height | Weight | Hometown | Notes |
|---|---|---|---|---|---|
| Therrian Alexander III | DB | 6'2" | 165 | Ellenwood, Georgia | |
| Ephraim Asiata | DL | 6'3" | 210 | West Valley, Utah | |
| Kinilau Fonohema | DB | 6'5" | 210 | Springville, Utah | |
| Dallin Johnson | DL | 6'3" | 290 | Springville, Utah | |
| Jonathan Kabeya | DB | 5'10" | 170 | Richland Hills, Texas | |
| Brody Laga | K | 5'11" | 250 | Herriman, Utah | Mission prior to enrolling |
| Matthias Leach | DB | 6'3" | 175 | Fort Worth, Texas | |
| Blake Lowe | LB | 6'3" | 205 | Temecula, California | Mission prior to enrolling |
| Noah Lugo | QB | 6'2" | 185 | Haslet, Texas | |
| Tei Nacua | WR | 6'2" | 180 | Provo, Utah | |
| Jett Nelson | WR | 6'5" | 210 | American Fork, Utah | Mission prior to enrolling |
| Tommy Prassas | DB | 6'2" | 190 | Chandler, Arizona | |
| Adney Reid | DL | 6'5" | 225 | Sydney, Australia | Mission prior to enrolling |
| Cannon Skidmore | LS | 6'2" | 200 | Mesa, Arizona | |
| Carson Su'esu'e | ATH | 6'5" | 215 | Oakley, California | |
| Ryner Swanson | TE | 6'4" | 235 | Laguna Beach, California | |
| Devoux Tuataga | DL | 6'6" | 245 | Eagle Mountain, Utah | Mission prior to enrolling |
| Ikinasio Tupou | OL | 6'6" | 290 | Palo Alto, California | |
| Enoch Watson | QB | 6'3" | 202 | Queen Creek, Arizona | Mission prior to enrolling |
| Faletau Satuala | DB | 6'4" | 200 | Bountiful, Utah | |
| Prince Zombo | WR | 5'11" | 190 | Peoria, Arizona | |
| David Clifford | OL | 6'4" | 285 | Poway, California | |
| Jackson Nelson | OL | 6'4" | 270 | Salem, Utah | |
| Iosefa Letuli | DL | 6'5" | 230 | Oceanside, California | |
| Tyler West | WR | 5'10" | 165 | Washington, Utah | |

=== 2023 returned missionaries ===
| Joe Brown | OL | 6'4" | 285 | Freshman |
| Viliami Po'uha | DL | 6'3" | 260 | Freshman |
| Nathan Hoke | LB | 6'3" | 225 | Freshman |
| Dallin Havea | LB | 6'2" | 230 | Freshman |
| Sione Hingano | OL | 6'5" | 285 | Freshman |
| Noah Moeaki | TE | 6'3" | 225 | Freshman |
| Cody Hagen | WR | 6'1" | 180 | Freshman |
| Jarinn Kalama | DB | 6'3" | 200 | Freshman |
| Dominique McKenzie | WR | 6'0" | 165 | Freshman |
| Jovesa Damuni | RB | 6'0" | 180 | Freshman |
| Sione Moa | RB | 5'10" | 220 | Freshman |
| Will Zundel | TE | 6'5" | 235 | Freshman |
| Payton VanSteenkiste | DB | 5'11" | 200 | Freshman |
| Orion Maile-Kaufusi | DL | 6'3" | 235 | Freshman |
| Weston Covey | WR | 5'11" | 185 | Freshman |
| Trevor Pay | OL | 6'3" | 285 | Freshman |
| Carson Tujague | DL | 6'3" | 235 | Freshman |
| Rowan Reay | WR | 6'4" | 188 | Freshman |
| Charles Miska | RB | 5'11" | 200 | Freshman |

=== 2023 other additions ===
| Name | Pos. | Height | Weight | Year | Previous school |
|---|---|---|---|---|---|
| Treyson Bourguet | QB | 6'2" | 215 | Freshman | Transfer from Western Michigan University |
| Gerry Bohanon | QB | 6'3" | 226 | Junior | Transfer from University of South Florida |
| Marque Collins | DB | 6'0" | 170 | Junior | Transfer from Weber State University |
| Jack Kelly | LB | 6'2" | 235 | Sophomore | Transfer from Weber State University |
| Luke To'omalatai | DL | 6'3" | 305 | Sophomore | Transfer from Long Beach City College |
| Sani Tuala | DL | 6'5" | 260 | Freshman | Transfer from Citrus College |
| Sam Vander Haar | P | 6'0" | 218 | Freshman | Transfer from University of Pittsburgh |
| John Taumoepeau | DL | 6'2" | 290 | Sophomore | Transfer from Snow College |
| Austin Leausa | OL | 6'5" | 310 | Sophomore | Transfer from Southern Utah University |
| Choe Bryant-Strother | LB | 6'3" | 235 | Senior | Transfer from the University of California, Los Angeles |
| McCae Hillstead | QB | 5'10" | 190 | Freshman | Transfer from Utah State University |
| Isaiah Jatta | OL | 6'6" | 320 | Senior | Transfer from University of Colorado |
| Marquis Taliulu | WR | 6'4" | 220 | Senior | Transfer from the University of California, Berkeley |
| Pokaiaua Haunga | RB | 5'11" | 200 | Freshman | Previously Signed in 2023 |

=== 2023 departures ===
| Name | Pos. | Height | Weight | Year | Reason |
|---|---|---|---|---|---|
| Jacob Boren | DB | 5'9" | 180 | Senior | Graduation |
| Jackson Cravens | DL | 6'2" | 305 | Senior | Graduation |
| Ian Fitzgerald | OL | 6'6" | 305 | Senior | Graduation |
| Kamden Garrett | DB | 5'11" | 181 | Senior | Graduation |
| Eddie Heckard | DB | 5'10" | 190 | Senior | Graduation |
| Atunaisa Mahe | DL | 6'1" | 315 | Senior | Graduation |
| Paul Maile | OL | 6'2" | 300 | Senior | Graduation |
| Simi Moala | OL | 6'7" | 310 | Senior | Graduation |
| Malik Moore | DB | 6'0" | 195 | Senior | Graduation |
| Kedon Slovis | QB | 6'3" | 215 | Senior | Graduation |
| Deion Smith | RB | 6'0" | 200 | Senior | Graduation |
| Max Tooley | LB | 6'2" | 225 | Senior | Graduation |
| AJ Vongphachanh | LB | 6'3" | 235 | Senior | Graduation |
| Talmage Gunther | WR | 5'11" | 190 | Junior | Graduation |
| Ammon Hannemann | LB | 6'2" | 211 | Junior | Graduation |
| Caden Haws | DL | 6'2" | 305 | Junior | Graduation |
| Ben Bywater | LB | 6'3" | 235 | Junior | Graduation |
| Caleb Christensen | DB | 5'10" | 187 | Junior | Graduation |
| Chaz Ah You | LB | 6'2" | 220 | Junior | Graduation |
| Ben Ward | OL | 6'4" | 290 | Junior | Graduation |
| Hobbs Nyberg | WR | 5'10" | 195 | Junior | Graduation |
| Isaac Rex | TE | 6'6" | 255 | Junior | NFL Draft |
| Ryan Rehkow | P | 6'5" | 255 | Junior | NFL Draft |
| Kingsley Suamataia | OL | 6'8" | 305 | Sophomore | NFL Draft |
| Aidan Robbins | RB | 6'3" | 240 | Junior | NFL Draft |
| Fisher Jackson | DL | 6'5" | 230 | Junior | Transfer |
| Austin Riggs | LS | 6'4" | 230 | Junior | Transfer |
| Michael Daley | DL | 6'2" | 255 | Sophomore | Transfer |
| John Henry Daley | DL | 6'5" | 225 | Freshman | Transfer |
| Dom Henry | WR | 5'11" | 175 | Freshman | Transfer |
| Quenton Rice | DB | 6'1" | 195 | Sophomore | Transfer |
| Kade Moore | WR | 5'11" | 185 | Sophomore | Transfer |
| Nick Billoups | QB | 6'1" | 203 | Sophomore | Transfer |
| Naseri Danielson | LB | 6'0" | 195 | Freshman | Transfer |
| Ryder Burton | QB | 6'2" | 200 | Freshman | Transfer |
| Devin Downing | WR | 6'1" | 190 | Freshman | Transfer |
| Jake Hill | WR | 6'2" | 190 | Freshman | Transfer |
| Zion Allen | DB | 6'1" | 160 | Freshman | Transfer |
| Cade Fennegan | QB | 6'2" | 190 | Sophomore | Transfer |
| Peter Falaniko | OL | 6'3" | 315 | Freshman | Transfer |
| Dylan Flowers | DB | 5'11" | 180 | Sophomore | Transfer |
| Nukuluve Helu | RB | 6'1" | 215 | Freshman | |
| Jordan Kapisi | K | 6'0" | 190 | Freshman | |
| Kason Krebs | LB | 6'0" | 210 | Freshman | |
| Joseph Paulo | OL | 6'8" | 330 | Junior | |
| Bentley Redden | TE | 6'5" | 225 | Freshman | |
| Ty Burke | DB | 6'1" | 175 | Freshman | |
| Wyatt Dawe | DL | 6'0" | 295 | Sophomore | |
| Tyler Little | DL | 6'6" | 295 | Sophomore | |

== Schedule ==
| Date | Time | Opponent | Rank | Site | TV | Result | Attendance |
|---|---|---|---|---|---|---|---|
| August 31 | 6:00 p.m. | No. 10 (FCS) Southern Illinois* | | LaVell Edwards Stadium; Provo, UT | ESPN+ | W 41–13 | 63,712 |
| September 6 | 5:00 p.m. | at SMU* | | Gerald J. Ford Stadium; University Park, TX | ESPN2 | W 18–15 | 31,172 |
| September 14 | 7:00 p.m. | at Wyoming* | | War Memorial Stadium; Laramie, WY | CBSSN | W 34–14 | 24,513 |
| September 21 | 8:30 p.m. | No. 13 Kansas State | | LaVell Edwards Stadium; Provo, UT | ESPN | W 38–9 | 64,201 |
| September 28 | 10:00 a.m. | at Baylor | No. 22 | McLane Stadium; Waco, TX | FS1 | W 34–28 | 39,583 |
| October 12 | 2:00 p.m. | Arizona | No. 14 | LaVell Edwards Stadium; Provo, UT (Big Noon Kickoff) | FOX | W 41–19 | 64,420 |
| October 18 | 8:15 p.m. | Oklahoma State^{†} | No. 13 | LaVell Edwards Stadium; Provo, UT | ESPN | W 38–35 | 62,841 |
| October 26 | 1:30 p.m. | at UCF | No. 11 | FBC Mortgage Stadium; Orlando, FL | ESPN | W 37–24 | 42,144 |
| November 9 | 8:15 p.m. | at Utah | No. 9 | Rice–Eccles Stadium; Salt Lake City, UT (Holy War) | ESPN | W 22–21 | 54,383 |
| November 16 | 8:15 p.m. | Kansas | No. 6 | LaVell Edwards Stadium; Provo, UT | ESPN | L 13–17 | 62,704 |
| November 23 | 1:30 p.m. | at No. 21 Arizona State | No. 14 | Mountain America Stadium; Tempe, AZ | ESPN | L 23–28 | 55,400 |
| November 30 | 8:15 p.m. | Houston | No. 19 | LaVell Edwards Stadium; Provo, UT | ESPN | W 30–18 | 59,213 |
| December 28 | 5:30 p.m. | vs. No. 23 Colorado* | No. 17 | Alamodome; San Antonio, TX (Alamo Bowl) | ABC | W 36–14 | 64,261 |
*Non-conference game; ^{†}Homecoming; Rankings from AP Poll (and CFP Rankings, after November 5) - Released prior to game; All times are in Mountain time

== Rankings ==
Ranking movements Legend: ██ Increase in ranking ██ Decrease in ranking — = Not ranked RV = Received votes
| | Week | | | | | | | | | | | | | | | | |
| Poll | Pre | 1 | 2 | 3 | 4 | 5 | 6 | 7 | 8 | 9 | 10 | 11 | 12 | 13 | 14 | 15 | Final |
|---|---|---|---|---|---|---|---|---|---|---|---|---|---|---|---|---|---|
| AP | — | — | RV | RV | 22 | 17 | 14 | 13 | 11 | 9 | 9 | 7 | 14 | 19 | 17 | 17 | 13 |
| Coaches | — | — | RV | RV | 22 | 19 | 15 | 13 | 12 | 12 | 9 | 8 | 15 | 20 | 18 | 17 | 14 |
| CFP | Not released | | | | | | | | | | 9 | 6 | 14 | 19 | 18 | 17 | Not released |

== Game summaries ==
=== vs No. 10 (FCS) Southern Illinois ===
No. 10 (FCS) Southern Illinois Salukis (0–0) vs BYU Cougars (0–0) – Game summary

| Quarter | 1 | 2 | 3 | 4 | Total |
|---|---|---|---|---|---|
| No. 10 (FCS) Salukis | 0 | 6 | 7 | 0 | 13 |
| Cougars | 14 | 3 | 14 | 10 | 41 |

at LaVell Edwards Stadium • Provo, UT

- Date: August 31, 2024
- Game time: 6:00 p.m. MST
- Game weather: Sunny, 89 °F (32 °C)
- Game attendance: 63,712
- TV announcers (ESPN+): Richard Cross (play-by-play) and Barrett Brooks (analyst)

Game information

First quarter
Second quarter
Third quarter
Fourth quarter

| Statistics | SIU | BYU |
|---|---|---|
| First downs | 12 | 27 |
| Total yards | 231 | 527 |
| Rushing yards | 123 | 179 |
| Passing yards | 108 | 348 |
| Passing: Comp–Att–Int | 13-26 | 20-30 |
| Time of possession | 20:46 | 39:14 |

| Team | Category | Player | Statistics |
|---|---|---|---|
| Southern Illinois | Passing | DJ Williams | 10/20, 98 yards, 1 INT |
| Southern Illinois | Rushing | DJ Williams | 15 carries, 121 yards, 2 TD |
| Southern Illinois | Receiving | Keontez Lewis | 2 receptions, 49 yards |
| BYU | Passing | Jake Retzlaff | 20/30, 348 yards, 3 TD |
| BYU | Rushing | LJ Martin | 13 carries, 67 yards, 1 TD |
| BYU | Receiving | Chase Roberts | 7 receptions, 108 yards, |

=== at SMU ===
Game Two – BYU Cougars (1–0) at SMU Mustangs (2–0) – Game summary

| Quarter | 1 | 2 | 3 | 4 | Total |
|---|---|---|---|---|---|
| Cougars | 7 | 0 | 8 | 3 | 18 |
| Mustangs | 0 | 9 | 3 | 3 | 15 |

at Gerald J. Ford Stadium, University Park, Texas

- Date: September 6
- Game time: 6:00 p.m. CDT
- Game weather: Cloudy, 86 °F (30 °C)
- Game attendance: 31,172
- Referee: Cravonne Barrett
- TV announcers (ESPN2): Anish Shroff (play-by-play), Andre Ware (analyst), and Paul Carcaterra (sideline)

Game information

First quarter

- BYU – Mata'ava Ta'ase 16-yard pass from Jake Retzlaff (Will Ferrin kick), 7:16. Cougars 7–0. Drive: 8 plays, 75 yards, 3:23.

Second quarter

- SMU – Collin Rogers 53-yard field goal, 13:06. Cougars 7–3. Drive: 5 plays, 16 yards, 1:46.
- SMU – Collin Rogers 52-yard field goal, 6:03. Cougars 7–6. Drive: 10 plays, 36 yards, 3:26.
- SMU – Collin Rogers 38-yard field goal, 0:42. Mustangs 9–7. Drive: 9 plays, 50 yards, 2:04.

Third quarter

- SMU – Collin Rogers 28-yard field goal, 9:28. Mustangs 12–7. Drive: 11 plays, 24 yards, 4:13.
- BYU – Enoch Nawahine 9-yard run (Jake Retzlaff pass to Keanu Hill), 1:15. Cougars 15–12. Drive: 7 plays, 61 yards, 4:19.

Fourth quarter

- SMU – Collin Rogers 45-yard field goal, 6:17. Tied 15–15. Drive: 6 plays, 17 yards, 2:51.
- BYU – Will Ferrin 26-yard field goal, 1:58. Cougars 18–15. Drive: 9 plays, 67 yards, 4:19.

| Statistics | BYU | SMU |
|---|---|---|
| First downs | 16 | 18 |
| Total yards | 336 | 261 |
| Rushing yards | 134 | 117 |
| Passing yards | 202 | 144 |
| Turnovers | 3 | 3 |
| Time of possession | 30:53 | 29:07 |

| Team | Category | Player | Statistics |
|---|---|---|---|
| BYU | Passing | Jake Retzlaff | 15/28, 202 yards, 1TD, 2INT |
| BYU | Rushing | Miles Davis | 3 carries, 37 yards |
| BYU | Receiving | Darius Lassiter | 2 receptions, 62 yards |
| SMU | Passing | Kevin Jennings | 15/32, 140 yards, 1 INT |
| SMU | Rushing | Brashard Smith | 14 carries, 75 yards |
| SMU | Receiving | Key'Shawn Smith | 4 receptions, 46 yards |

=== at Wyoming ===
BYU Cougars (2–0) at Wyoming Cowboys (0–2) – Game summary

| Quarter | 1 | 2 | 3 | 4 | Total |
|---|---|---|---|---|---|
| Cougars | 7 | 10 | 17 | 0 | 34 |
| Cowboys | 0 | 7 | 0 | 7 | 14 |

at War Memorial Stadium • Laramie, WY

- Date: September 14, 2024
- Game time: 7:00 p.m. MST
- Game weather: Clear, 68 °F (20 °C)
- Game attendance: 24,513
- Referee: Cal McNeill
- TV announcers (CBSSN): Carter Blackburn (play-by-play), Randy Cross (analyst), and Brandon Baylor (sideline)

Game information

First quarter

- (5:58) BYU – Keanu Hill 20 yard pass from Jake Retzlaff, Will Ferrin kick (Drive: 7 plays, 44 yards, 3:24; BYU 7–0)

Second quarter

- (9:12) BYU – Kody Epps 3 yard pass from Jake Retzlaff, Will Ferrin kick (Drive: 9 plays, 74 yards, 4:23; BYU 14–0)
- (5:11) WYO – Evan Svoboda 2 yard run, John Hoyland kick (Drive: 11 plays, 75 yards, 4:01; BYU 14–7)
- (0:45) BYU – Will Ferrin 45 yard field goal (Drive: 7 plays, 43 yards, 2:04; BYU 17–7)

Third quarter

- (14:45) BYU – Keelan Marion 100 yard kickoff return, Will Ferrin kick (BYU 24–7)
- (9:42) BYU – Will Ferrin 37 yard field goal (Drive: 8 plays, 45 yards, 4:07; BYU 27–7)
- (0:02) BYU – Darius Lassiter 20 yard pass from Jake Retzlaff, Will Ferrin kick (Drive: 5 plays, 77 yards, 2:33; BYU 34–7)

Fourth quarter

- (6:29) WYO – Evan Svoboda 1 yard run, John Hoyland kick (Drive: 12 plays, 76 yards, 5:10; BYU 34–14)

| Statistics | BYU | WYO |
|---|---|---|
| First downs | 23 | 12 |
| Total yards | 458 | 217 |
| Rushing yards | 140 | 77 |
| Passing yards | 318 | 140 |
| Passing: Comp–Att–Int | 25-39-1 | 14–32–1 |
| Time of possession | 33:07 | 26:53 |

| Team | Category | Player | Statistics |
|---|---|---|---|
| BYU | Passing | Jake Retzlaff | 22/36, 291 yards, 3 TD, 1 INT |
| BYU | Rushing | Jake Retzlaff | 6 carries, 62 yards |
| BYU | Receiving | Chase Roberts | 6 receptions, 129 yards |
| Wyoming | Passing | Evan Svoboda | 14/32, 140 yards, 1 INT |
| Wyoming | Rushing | Evan Svoboda | 9 carries, 31 yards, 1 TD |
| Wyoming | Receiving | Tyler King | 3 receptions, 52 yards |

=== vs No. 13 Kansas State ===
No. 13 Kansas State Wildcats (3–0) vs BYU Cougars (3–0) – Game summary

| Quarter | 1 | 2 | 3 | 4 | Total |
|---|---|---|---|---|---|
| No. 13 Wildcats | 3 | 3 | 3 | 0 | 9 |
| Cougars | 0 | 17 | 14 | 7 | 38 |

at LaVell Edwards Stadium • Provo, UT

- Date: September 21, 2024
- Game time: 8:30 p.m. MST
- Game weather: Sunny, 65 °F (18 °C)
- Game attendance: 64,201
- Referee: Mike McCabe
- TV announcers (ESPN): Dave Flemming (play-by-play), Brock Osweiler (analyst), and Stormy Buonantony (sideline)
  (Gridiron Radio): Noah Britt, Jon Reynolds, and Robbie Bullough

Game information

First quarter
Second quarter
Third quarter
Fourth quarter

| Statistics | KSU | BYU |
|---|---|---|
| First downs | 17 | 14 |
| Total yards | 367 | 241 |
| Rushing yards | 228 | 92 |
| Passing yards | 139 | 149 |
| Passing: Comp–Att–Int | 16-29-2 | 15–21 |
| Time of possession | 33:03 | 26:57 |

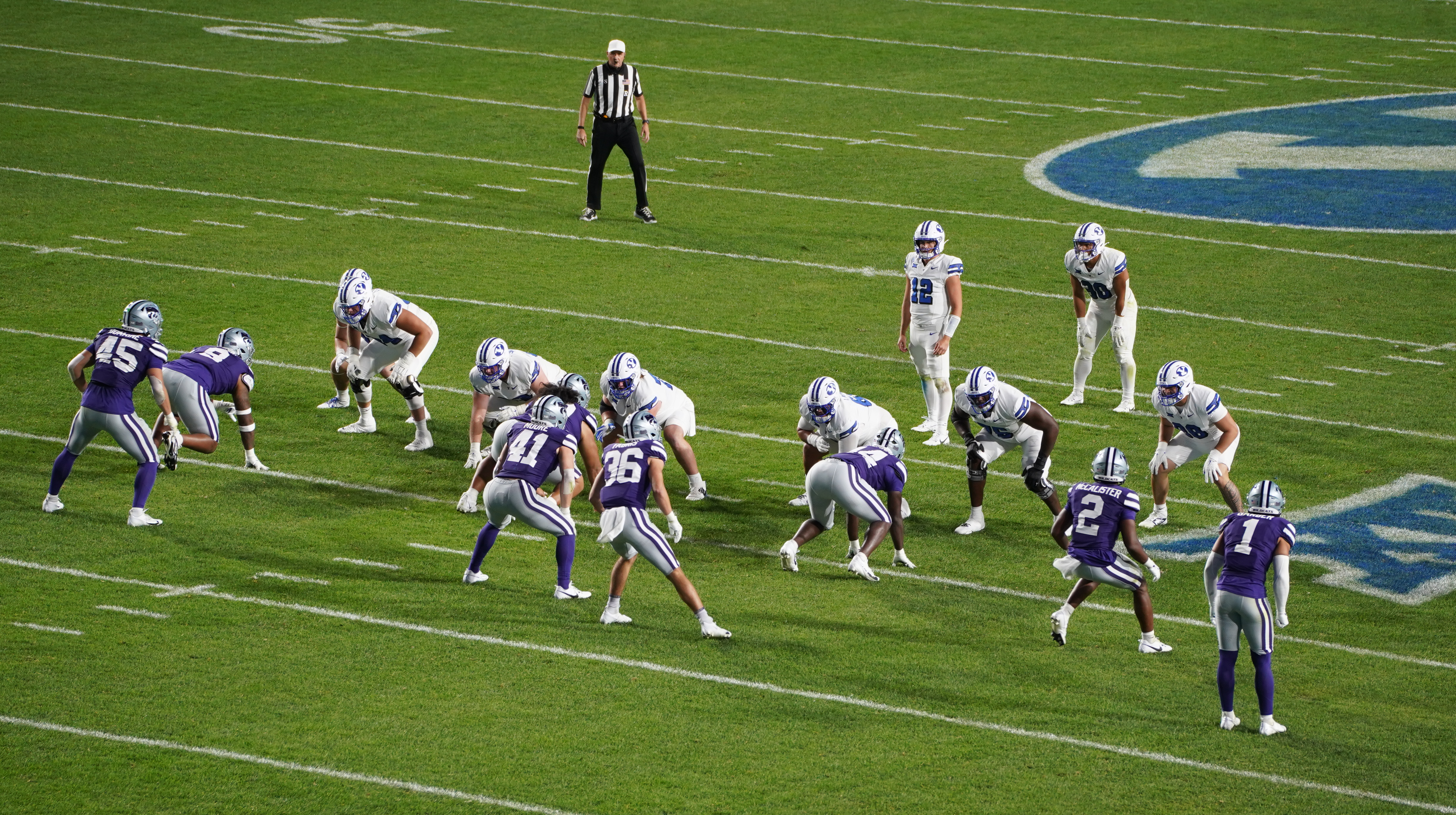

| Team | Category | Player | Statistics |
|---|---|---|---|
| Kansas State | Passing | Avery Johnson | 15/28, 130 yards, 2 INT |
| Kansas State | Rushing | DJ Giddens | 19 carries, 93 yards |
| Kansas State | Receiving | Jayce Brown | 4 receptions, 51 yards |
| BYU | Passing | Jake Retzlaff | 15/21, 149 yards, 2 TD |
| BYU | Rushing | Sione Moa | 15 carries, 76 yards, 1 TD |
| BYU | Receiving | Chase Roberts | 2 receptions, 47 yards, 1 TD |

=== at Baylor ===
No. 22 BYU Cougars (4–0) at Baylor Bears (2–2) – Game summary

| Quarter | 1 | 2 | 3 | 4 | Total |
|---|---|---|---|---|---|
| No. 22 Cougars | 21 | 10 | 3 | 0 | 34 |
| Bears | 7 | 7 | 7 | 7 | 28 |

at McLane Stadium • Waco, TX

- Date: September 28, 2024
- Game time: 10:00 a.m.
- Game weather: Sunny, 79 °F (26 °C)
- Game attendance: 39,583
- Referee: Kevin Mar
- TV announcers (FS1): Alex Faust (play-by-play) and Robert Smith (analyst)

Game information

First quarter
Second quarter
Third quarter
Fourth quarter

| Statistics | BYU | BAY |
|---|---|---|
| First downs | 20 | 21 |
| Total yards | 367 | 387 |
| Rushing yards | 151 | 63 |
| Passing yards | 216 | 324 |
| Passing: Comp–Att–Int | 17-32-2 | 27–48–2 |
| Time of possession | 31:04 | 28:56 |

| Team | Category | Player | Statistics |
|---|---|---|---|
| BYU | Passing | Jake Retzlaff | 17/31, 216 yards, 2 TD, 2 INT |
| BYU | Rushing | Jake Retzlaff | 6 carries, 53 yards, 1 TD |
| BYU | Receiving | Darius Lassiter | 8 receptions, 120 yards, 1 TD |
| Baylor | Passing | Sawyer Robertson | 27/48, 324 yards, 3 TD, 2 INT |
| Baylor | Rushing | Bryson Washington | 13 carries, 31 yards |
| Baylor | Receiving | Josh Cameron | 7 receptions, 125 yards, 2 TD |

=== vs Arizona ===
Arizona Wildcats (3–2) vs No. 14 BYU Cougars (5–0) – Game summary

| Quarter | 1 | 2 | 3 | 4 | Total |
|---|---|---|---|---|---|
| Wildcats | 7 | 0 | 3 | 9 | 19 |
| No. 14 Cougars | 0 | 14 | 13 | 14 | 41 |

at LaVell Edwards Stadium • Provo, UT

- Date: October 12, 2024
- Game time: 2:00 p.m.
- Game weather: Sunny, 78 °F (26 °C)
- Game attendance: 64,420
- Referee: Mike McCabe
- TV announcers (FOX): Gus Johnson (play-by-play), Joel Klatt (analyst), and Jenny Taft (sideline)

Game information
First quarter
- (3:27) ARIZ – Montana Lemonious-Craig 14-yard pass from Noah Fifita, Tyler Loop kick (Drive: 11 plays, 95 yards, 4:52; Arizona 7–0)

Second quarter

- (13:30) BYU – Parker Kingston 20-yard pass from Jake Retzlaff, Will Ferrin Kick (Drive: 10 plays, 75 yards, 4:57; Arizona 7–7)
- (6:30) BYU – LJ Martin 33-yard pass from Parker Kingston, Will Ferrin Kick (Drive: 7 plays, 99 yards, 3:40; BYU 14–7)

Third quarter

- (14:50) BYU – Chase Roberts 9-yard pass from Jake Retzlaff, Will Ferrin Kick (Drive: 1 plays, 9 yards, 0:00; BYU 21–7)
- (13:11) BYU – Will Ferrin 33-yard field goal (Drive: 4 plays, 0 yards, 0:57; BYU 24–7)
- (6:12) ARIZ – Tyler Loop 33-yard field goal (Drive: 8 plays, 22 yards, 3:40; BYU 24–10)
- (1:47) BYU – Will Ferrin 39-yard field goal (Drive: 10 plays, 54 yards, 4:25; BYU 27–10)

Fourth quarter

- (9:02) ARIZ – Tyler Loop 21-yard field goal (Drive: 18 plays, 72 yards, 7:45; BYU 27–13)
- (5:38) BYU – LJ Martin 1-yard run, Will Ferrin Kick (Drive: 6 plays, 75 yards, 3:24; BYU 34–13)
- (2:58) ARIZ – Quali Conley 2-yard run, two-point attempt failed (Drive: 10 plays, 75 yards, 2:40; BYU 34–19)
- (1:02) BYU – Isaiah Glasker 21-yard run interception, Will Ferrin Kick (Drive: 4 plays, 0 yards, 0:30; BYU 41–19)

| Statistics | ARIZ | BYU |
|---|---|---|
| First downs | 25 | 22 |
| Total yards | 389 | 398 |
| Rushing yards | 114 | 147 |
| Passing yards | 275 | 251 |
| Passing: Comp–Att–Int | 26-52-3 | 19–33 |
| Time of possession | 32:39 | 27:21 |

| Team | Category | Player | Statistics |
|---|---|---|---|
| Arizona | Passing | Noah Fifita | 26/52, 275 yards, 1 TD, 3 INT |
| Arizona | Rushing | Kedrick Reescano | 9 carries, 48 yards |
| Arizona | Receiving | Tetairoa McMillan | 5 receptions, 78 yards |
| BYU | Passing | Jake Retzlaff | 18/32, 218 yards, 2 TD |
| BYU | Rushing | Hinckley Ropati | 9 carries, 65 yards |
| BYU | Receiving | Darius Lassiter | 5 receptions, 86 yards |

=== vs Oklahoma State ===
Oklahoma State Cowboys (3–3) vs No. 13 BYU Cougars (6–0) – Game summary

| Quarter | 1 | 2 | 3 | 4 | Total |
|---|---|---|---|---|---|
| Cowboys | 7 | 14 | 0 | 14 | 35 |
| No. 13 Cougars | 7 | 7 | 14 | 10 | 38 |

at LaVell Edwards Stadium • Provo, UT

- Date: October 18, 2024
- Game time: 8:15 p.m.
- Game weather: Cloudy, 45 °F (7 °C)
- Game attendance: 62,841
- Referee: Luke Richmond
- TV announcers (ESPN): Anish Shroff (play-by-play), Andre Ware (analyst), and Paul Carcaterra (sideline)
  (Gridiron Radio): Noah Britt, Jon Reynolds, and Robbie Bullough

Game information

First quarter

- (11:57) BYU – Jake Retzlaff 4 yard rush, Will Ferrin kick (Drive: 6 plays, 75 yards, 3:03; BYU 7–0)
- (9:42) OSU – Ollie Gordon II 50 yard rush, Logan Ward kick (Drive: 5 plays, 75 yards, 2:15; Tied 7–7)

Second quarter

- (14:01) BYU – LJ Martin 1 yard rush, Will Ferrin kick (Drive: 1 play, 1 yard, 0:04; BYU 14–7)
- (7:55) OSU – Ollie Gordon II 17 yard pass from Garrett Rangel, Logan Ward kick (Drive: 10 plays, 75 yards, 6:06; Tied 14–14)
- (0:32) OSU – Ollie Gordon II 2 yard rush, Logan Ward kick (Drive: 7 plays, 76 yards, 3:12; OSU 21–14)

Third quarter

- (5:51) BYU – LJ Martin 8 yard rush, Will Ferrin kick (Drive: 7 plays, 69 yards, 4:01; Tied 21–21)
- (3:43) BYU – Keelan Marion 34 yard pass from Jake Retzlaff, Will Ferrin kick (Drive: 4 plays, 44 yards, 2:01; BYU 28–21)

Fourth quarter

- (14:50) OSU – Brennan Presley 16 yard pass from Alan Bowman, Logan Ward kick (Drive: 9 plays, 79 yards, 3:53; Tied 28–28)
- (9:39) BYU – Will Ferrin 41 yard field goal (Drive: 11 plays, 52 yards, 5:11; BYU 31–28)
- (1:13) OSU – Brennan Presley 6 yard pass from Alan Bowman, Logan Ward kick (Drive: 17 plays, 76 yards, 8:26; OSU 35–31)
- (0:10) BYU – Darius Lassister 35 yard pass from Jake Retzlaff, Will Ferrin kick (Drive: 8 plays, 75 yards, 1:02; BYU 38–35)

| Statistics | OKST | BYU |
|---|---|---|
| First downs | 22 | 25 |
| Total yards | 421 | 473 |
| Rushing yards | 269 | 255 |
| Passing yards | 152 | 218 |
| Passing: Comp–Att–Int | 18-29-2 | 13–28–3 |
| Time of possession | 31:43 | 28:17 |

| Team | Category | Player | Statistics |
|---|---|---|---|
| Oklahoma State | Passing | Alan Bowman | 11/19, 85 yards, 1 TD, 1 INT |
| Oklahoma State | Rushing | Ollie Gordon II | 16 carries, 107 yards, 2 TD |
| Oklahoma State | Receiving | Brennan Presley | 5 receptions, 43 yards, 1TD |
| BYU | Passing | Jake Retzlaff | 13/26, 218 yards, 2 TD, 2 INT |
| BYU | Rushing | LJ Martin | 20 carries, 120 yards, 2 TD |
| BYU | Receiving | Darius Lassiter | 6 receptions, 129 yards, 1 TD |

=== at UCF ===
No. 11 BYU Cougars (7–0) at UCF Knights (3–4) – Game summary

| Quarter | 1 | 2 | 3 | 4 | Total |
|---|---|---|---|---|---|
| No. 11 Cougars | 7 | 17 | 10 | 3 | 37 |
| Knights | 0 | 10 | 0 | 14 | 24 |

at FBC Mortgage Stadium • Orlando, FL

- Date: October 26, 2024
- Game time: 1:30 p.m.
- Game weather: 84 °F (29 °C)
- Game attendance: 42,144
- Referee: Kevin Boitmann
- TV announcers (ESPN): Mike Couzens (play-by-play), Brock Osweiler (analyst), and Stormy Buonantony (sideline)

Game information

First quarter

- BYU: Jake Retzlaff 29-yrd touchdown run (Will Ferrin Kick), 10:32

Second quarter

- BYU: Will Ferrin 41-yard field goal, 14:53
- BYU: LJ Martin 15-yard touchdown run (Will Ferrin Kick), 8:13
- UCF: RJ Harvey 2-yard touchdown run (Grant Reddick Kick), 7:02
- UCF: Grant Reddick 38-yard field goal, 0:59
- BYU: Chase Roberts 62-yard touchdown pass from Jake Retzlaff (Will Ferrin Kick), 0:27

Third quarter

- BYU: Mata'ava Ta'ase 1-yard touchdown pass from Jake Retzlaff (Will Ferrin Kick), 7:01
- BYU: Will Ferrin 37-yard field goal, 3:40

Fourth quarter

- UCF: RJ Harvey 5 -yard touchdown run (Dylan Rizk Run for Two-Point Conversion), 9:14
- BYU: Will Ferrin 36-yard field goal, 3:10
- UCF: Jacoby Jones 29-yard touchdown pass from Dylan Rizk (Two-point conversion failed), 0:56

| Statistics | BYU | UCF |
|---|---|---|
| First downs | 29 | 18 |
| Total yards | 490 | 379 |
| Rushing yards | 252 | 181 |
| Passing yards | 228 | 198 |
| Passing: Comp–Att–Int | 16-24 | 14–27–2 |
| Time of possession | 40:28 | 19:32 |

| Team | Category | Player | Statistics |
|---|---|---|---|
| BYU | Passing | Jake Retzlaff | 16/24, 228 yards, 2 TD |
| BYU | Rushing | LJ Martin | 15 carries, 101 yards, 1 TD |
| BYU | Receiving | Chase Roberts | 2 receptions, 75 yards, 1 TD |
| UCF | Passing | Dylan Rizk | 6/10, 102 yards, 1 TD |
| UCF | Rushing | RJ Harvey | 16 carries, 127 yards, 2 TD |
| UCF | Receiving | Jacoby Jones | 6 receptions, 116 yards, 1 TD |

=== at Utah (Holy War) ===
No. 9 BYU Cougars (8–0) at Utah Utes (4–4) – Game summary

| Quarter | 1 | 2 | 3 | 4 | Total |
|---|---|---|---|---|---|
| No. 9 Cougars | 3 | 7 | 3 | 9 | 22 |
| Utes | 0 | 21 | 0 | 0 | 21 |

at Rice-Eccles Stadium • Salt Lake City, UT

- Date: November 9, 2024
- Game time: 8:15 p.m.
- Game weather: 0 °F (−18 °C)
- Game attendance: 54,383
- TV announcers (ESPN): Dave Flemming (play-by-play), Brock Osweiler (analyst), and Stormy Buonantony (sideline)

Game information

First quarter
Second quarter
Third quarter
Fourth quarter

| Statistics | BYU | UTAH |
|---|---|---|
| First downs | 20 | 15 |
| Total yards | 339 | 259 |
| Rushing yards | 120 | 147 |
| Passing yards | 219 | 112 |
| Passing: Comp–Att–Int | 15–33–0 | 12–22–2 |
| Time of possession | 29:50 | 30:10 |

| Team | Category | Player | Statistics |
|---|---|---|---|
| BYU | Passing | Jake Retzlaff | 15/33, 219 yards |
| BYU | Rushing | LJ Martin | 11 carries, 68 yards |
| BYU | Receiving | Chase Roberts | 6 receptions, 91 yards |
| Utah | Passing | Brandon Rose | 12/21, 112 yards, 2 TD, INT |
| Utah | Rushing | Micah Bernard | 17 carries, 78 yards |
| Utah | Receiving | Dorian Singer | 5 receptions, 76 yards |

=== vs Kansas ===
Kansas Jayhawks (3–6) vs No. 6 BYU Cougars (9–0) – Game summary

| Quarter | 1 | 2 | 3 | 4 | Total |
|---|---|---|---|---|---|
| Jayhawks | 7 | 3 | 0 | 7 | 17 |
| No. 6 Cougars | 0 | 10 | 3 | 0 | 13 |

at LaVell Edwards Stadium • Provo, UT

- Date: November 16, 2024
- Game time: 8:15 p.m.
- Game weather: Cloudy • Temperature: 33 °F (1 °C) • Wind: S 3 miles per hour (4.8 km/h)
- Game attendance: 62,704
- Referee: David Alvarez
- TV announcers (ESPN): Mark Jones (play-by-play), Roddy Jones (analyst), and Quint Kessenich (sideline)

Game information

First quarter

- (9:07) KAN – Devin Neal 8-yard run, Tabor Allen kick. (Drive: 10 plays, 84 yards, 5:49; Kansas 7–0)

Second quarter

- (14:11) BYU – Will Ferrin 33-yard field goal. (Drive: 11 plays, 42 yards, 5:30; Kansas 7–3)
- (8:48) BYU – Hinckley Ropati 30-yard pass from Jake Retzlaff, Will Ferrin kick. (Drive: 8 plays, 69 yards, 4:31; BYU 10–7)
- (1:46) KAN – Tabor Allen 25-yard field goal. (Drive:11 plays, 68 yards, 7:02; Tied 10–10)

Third quarter

- (4:30) BYU – Will Ferrin 35-yard field goal. (Drive: 17 plays, 66 yards, 10:26; BYU 13–10)

Fourth quarter

- (13:19) KAN – Devin Neal 3-yard run, Tabor Allen kick. (Drive: 1 play, 3 yards, 0:04; Kansas 17–13)

| Statistics | KU | BYU |
|---|---|---|
| First downs | 13 | 22 |
| Total yards | 242 | 354 |
| Rushing yards | 73 | 162 |
| Passing yards | 169 | 192 |
| Passing: Comp–Att–Int | 12–19–1 | 18–29–1 |
| Time of possession | 28:57 | 31:03 |

| Team | Category | Player | Statistics |
|---|---|---|---|
| Kansas | Passing | Jalon Daniels | 12/19, 169 yards, INT |
| Kansas | Rushing | Devin Neal | 14 carries, 52 yards, 2 TD |
| Kansas | Receiving | Luke Grimm | 4 receptions, 77 yards |
| BYU | Passing | Jake Retzlaff | 18/28, 192 yards, TD, INT |
| BYU | Rushing | LJ Martin | 15 carries, 76 yards |
| BYU | Receiving | Chase Roberts | 5 receptions, 71 yards |

=== at No. 21 Arizona State ===
No. 14 BYU Cougars (9–1) at No. 21 Arizona State Sun Devils (8–2) – Game summary

| Quarter | 1 | 2 | 3 | 4 | Total |
|---|---|---|---|---|---|
| No. 14 Cougars | 0 | 3 | 14 | 6 | 23 |
| No. 21 Sun Devils | 7 | 14 | 7 | 0 | 28 |

at Mountain America Stadium • Tempe, AZ

- Date: November 23, 2024
- Game time: 1:30 p.m.
- Game weather: 0 °F (−18 °C)
- TV announcers (ESPN): Dave Pasch (play-by-play), Dusty Dvoracek (analyst), and Taylor McGregor (sideline reporter)

Game information

First quarter
Second quarter
Third quarter
Fourth quarter

| Statistics | BYU | ASU |
|---|---|---|
| First downs | | |
| Total yards | | |
| Rushing yards | | |
| Passing yards | | |
| Passing: Comp–Att–Int | | |
| Time of possession | | |

| Team | Category | Player | Statistics |
|---|---|---|---|
| BYU | Passing | | |
| BYU | Rushing | | |
| BYU | Receiving | | |
| Arizona State | Passing | | |
| Arizona State | Rushing | | |
| Arizona State | Receiving | | |

=== vs Houston ===
Houston Cougars (4–7) vs No. 19 BYU Cougars (9–2) – Game summary

| Quarter | 1 | 2 | 3 | 4 | Total |
|---|---|---|---|---|---|
| Cougars (HOU) | 0 | 0 | 0 | 0 | 0 |
| No. 19 Cougars (BYU) | 0 | 0 | 0 | 0 | 0 |

at LaVell Edwards Stadium • Provo, UT

- Date: November 30, 2024
- Game time: 8:15 p.m.
- Game weather: 0 °F (−18 °C)
- TV announcers (ESPN): Dave Flemming (play-by-play), Brock Osweiler (analyst), and Stormy Buonantony (sideline)

Game information

First quarter
Second quarter
Third quarter
Fourth quarter

| Statistics | HOU | BYU |
|---|---|---|
| First downs | | |
| Total yards | | |
| Rushing yards | | |
| Passing yards | | |
| Passing: Comp–Att–Int | | |
| Time of possession | | |

| Team | Category | Player | Statistics |
|---|---|---|---|
| Houston | Passing | | |
| Houston | Rushing | | |
| Houston | Receiving | | |
| BYU | Passing | | |
| BYU | Rushing | | |
| BYU | Receiving | | |

=== vs No. 23 Colorado (Alamo Bowl) ===
2024 Valero Alamo Bowl
No. 17 BYU Cougars (10–2) vs No. 23 Colorado Buffaloes (9–3) – Game summary

| Quarter | 1 | 2 | 3 | 4 | Total |
|---|---|---|---|---|---|
| No. 17 Cougars | 10 | 10 | 7 | 9 | 36 |
| No. 23 Buffaloes | 0 | 0 | 7 | 7 | 14 |

at Alamodome • San Antonio, TX

- Date: December 28, 2024
- Game time: 5:30 p.m. p.m. MST
- Game weather: None (indoor stadium)
- Game attendance: 64,261
- Referee: Kyle Olson (SEC)
- TV announcers (ABC): Dave Pasch (play-by-play), Dusty Dvoracek (analyst), and Taylor McGregor (sideline)
  (ESPN Radio): Jorge Sedano (play-by-play), Kelly Stouffer (analyst), and Ian Fitzsimmons (sideline)

Game information

First quarter

- (7:10) BYU – LJ Martin 1-yard run, Will Ferrin kick (Drive: 6 plays, 52 yards, 3:46; BYU 7–0)
- (2:19) BYU – Will Ferrin 51-yard field goal (Drive: 7 plays, 8 yards, 2:29; BYU 10–0)

Second quarter

- (5:32) BYU – Parker Kingston 64-yard kickoff return, Will Ferrin kick (Drive: 3 plays, -13 yards, 2:39; BYU 17–0)
- (0:00) BYU – Will Ferrin 54-yard field goal (Drive: 9 plays, 40 yards, 3:05; BYU 20–0)

Third quarter

- (8:03) BYU – Sione Moa 13-yard run, Will Ferrin kick (Drive: 9 plays, 55 yards, 4:58; BYU 27–0)
- (6:14) COLO – Travis Hunter 43-yard pass from Shedeur Sanders, Alejandro Mata kick (Drive: 4 plays, 63 yards, 1:49; BYU 27–7)

Fourth quarter

- (10:27) BYU – LJ Martin 9-yard run, two-point conversion failed (Drive: 4 plays, 42 yards, 2:32; BYU 33–7)
- (5:28) BYU – Will Ferrin 31-yard field goal (Drive: 6 plays, 18 yards, 4:12; BYU 36–7)
- (2:17) COLO – Sav'ell Smalls 2-yard pass from Shedeur Sanders, Alejandro Mata kick (Drive: 7 plays, 82 yards, 3:11; BYU 36–14)

| Statistics | BYU | COLO |
|---|---|---|
| First downs | 22 | 9 |
| Total yards | 331 | 210 |
| Rushes/yards | 42–180 | 19–2 |
| Passing yards | 151 | 208 |
| Passing: Comp–Att–Int | 12–23–3 | 16–23–2 |
| Time of possession | 35:56 | 24:04 |

| Team | Category | Player | Statistics |
|---|---|---|---|
| BYU | Passing | Jake Retzlaff | 12/21, 151 yards |
| BYU | Rushing | LJ Martin | 17 carries, 93 yards, 2 TD |
| BYU | Receiving | LJ Martin | 2 receptions, 33 yards |
| Colorado | Passing | Shedeur Sanders | 16/23, 208 yards, 2 TD, 2 INT |
| Colorado | Rushing | Micah Welch | 5 carries, 25 yards |
| Colorado | Receiving | Travis Hunter | 4 receptions, 106 yards, TD |

== Personnel ==
=== Coaching staff ===
| Name | Position |
|---|---|
| Kalani Sitake | Head coach |
| Jay Hill | Associate head coach/defensive coordinator/safeties coach |
| Kelly Poppinga | Special teams coordinator/defensive ends coach |
| Aaron Roderick | Offensive coordinator/quarterbacks coach |
| TJ Woods | Offensive line coach |
| Fesi Sitake | Passing game coordinator/wide receivers coach |
| Justin Ena | Linebackers coach |
| Kevin Gilbride | Tight ends coach |
| Jernaro Gilford | Cornerbacks coach |
| Harvey Unga | Running backs coach |
| Sione Po'uha | Defensive tackles coach |

=== Roster ===
2024 BYU Cougars football team roster
Players
Coaches
Offense

| Pos. | # | Name | Class |
|---|---|---|---|
| QB | 3 | Gerry Bohanon | Sr |
| QB | 10 | Treyson Bourguet | So |
| QB | 16 | Cole Hagen | Fr |
| QB | 15 | McCae Hillstead | So |
| QB | 19 | Noah Lugo | Fr |
| QB | 12 | Jake Retzlaff | Jr |
| OL | 72 | Joe Brown | Fr |
| OL | 79 | Kaden Chidester | Fr |
| OL | 52 | David Clifford | Fr |
| OL | 75 | Sam Dawe | So |
| OL | 56 | Jake Eichorn | Jr |
| OL | 76 | Caleb Etienne | Sr |
| OL | 77 | Jake Griffin | Fr |
| OL | 66 | Sione Hingano | Fr |
| OL | 50 | Isaiah Jatta | Sr |
| OL | 73 | Weston Jones | Fr |
| OL | 64 | Brayden Keim | Sr |
| OL | 61 | Weylin Lapuaho | Jr |
| OL | 55 | Austin Leausa | Jr |
| OL | 51 | Sonny Makasini | So |
| OL | 63 | Bruce Mitchell | So |
| OL | 54 | Jackson Nelson | Fr |
| OL | 74 | Trevin Ostler | So |
| OL | 70 | Connor Pay | Sr |
| OL | 67 | Trevor Pay | Fr |
| OL | 71 | Ikinasio Tupuo | Fr |
| RB | 28 | Jovesa Damuni | Fr |
| RB | 4 | Miles Davis | Jr |
| RB | 23 | Pokaiaua Haunga | Fr |
| RB | 27 | LJ Martin | So |
| RB | 34 | Charles Miska | Fr |
| RB | 30 | Sione I Moa | Fr |
| RB | 21 | Enoch Nawahine | Jr |
| RB | 7 | Hinckley Ropati | Sr |
| TE | 86 | Jackson Bowers | Fr |
| TE | 49 | Nason Coleman | Fr |
| TE | 87 | Ethan Erickson | Jr |
| TE | 22 | Mason Fakahua | Sr |
| TE | 1 | Keanu Hill | Sr |
| TE | 82 | Noah Moeaki | Fr |
| TE | 85 | Anthony Olsen | So |
| TE | 42 | Ray Paulo | Sr |
| TE | 80 | Ryner Swanson | Fr |
| TE | 99 | Mata'ava Ta'ase | Sr |
| TE | 32 | Will Zundel | Fr |
| WR | 83 | Weston Covey | Fr |
| WR | 0 | Kody Epps | Jr |
| WR | 18 | Cody Hagen | Fr |
| WR | 11 | Parker Kingston | So |
| WR | 5 | Darius Lassiter | Sr |
| WR | 17 | Keelan Marion | Jr |
| WR | 89 | Dominque McKenzie | Fr |
| WR | 20 | Marquis Taliulu | Sr |
| WR | 45 | Tei Nacua | Fr |
| WR | 13 | Jojo Phillips | Fr |
| WR | 29 | Rowan Reay | Fr |
| WR | 2 | Chase Roberts | Jr |
| WR | 26 | Tyler West | Fr |
| WR | 84 | Prince Zombo | Fr |

Defense

| Pos. | # | Name | Class |
|---|---|---|---|
| DB | 24 | Therrian Alexander | Fr |
| DB | 25 | Talan Alfrey | Jr |
| DB | 19 | Mory Bamba | Sr |
| DB | 2 | Marque Collins | Sr |
| DB | 3 | Raider Damuni | So |
| CB | 31 | Kevin Doe | Fr |
| DB | 29 | Jayden Dunlap | Jr |
| DB | 15 | Chika Ebunoha | So |
| DB | 20 | Koa Eldredge | Fr |
| DB | 1 | Micah Harper | Jr |
| DB | 21 | Evan Johnson | So |
| DB | 23 | Jonathan Kabeya | Fr |
| DB | 35 | Jarinn Kalama | Fr |
| DB | 27 | Matthias Leach | Fr |
| DB | 32 | Marcus Mckenzie | So |
| DB | 22 | Tommy Prassas | Fr |
| DB | 12 | Preston Rex (injured) | So |
| DB | 0 | Jakob Robinson | Sr |
| DB | 10 | Faletau Satuala | Fr |
| DB | 26 | Ethan Slade | Jr |
| DB | 37 | Malae Tanuvasa | Fr |
| DB | 42 | Petey Tuipulotu | So |
| DB | 38 | Payton VanSteenkiste | Fr |
| DB | 7 | Crew Wakley | Jr |
| DB | 28 | Tanner Wall | Jr |
| DL | 13 | Isaiah Bagnah | Sr |
| DL | 92 | Tyler Batty | Sr |
| DL | 97 | Kinilau Fonohema | Fr |
| DL | 50 | Dallin Havea | Fr |
| DL | 91 | Dallin Johnson | Fr |
| DL | 90 | David Latu | Jr |
| DL | 96 | Iosefa Letuli | Fr |
| DL | 59 | Logan Lutui | Sr |
| DL | 53 | Orion Maile-Kaufusi | Fr |
| DL | 93 | Blake Mangelson | Sr |
| DL | 94 | John Nelson | Sr |
| DL | 45 | Viliami Po'uha | Fr |
| DL | 48 | Bodie Schoonover | So |
| DL | 56 | Nuuletau Sellesin | Jr |
| DL | 99 | Joshua Singh | Jr |
| DL | 55 | John Taumoepeau | Jr |
| DL | 98 | Sani Tauala | So |
| DL | 95 | Luke To'omalatai | Jr |
| DL | 36 | Carson Tujague | Fr |
| LB | 44 | Ephraim Asiata | Fr |
| LB | 33 | Choe Bryant-Strother | Sr |
| LB | 54 | Siale Esera | So |
| LB | 49 | Lucky Finau | Fr |
| LB | 16 | Isaiah Glasker | So |
| LB | 30 | Miles Hall | Fr |
| LB | 46 | Nathan Hoke | Fr |
| LB | 18 | Ace Kaufusi | So |
| LB | 34 | Maika Kaufusi | Fr |
| LB | 17 | Jack Kelly | Jr |
| LB | 58 | Aisea Moa | So |
| LB | 41 | Sione Moa | Jr |
| LB | 11 | Harrison Taggart | So |

Special teams

| Pos. | # | Name | Class |
|---|---|---|---|
| DS | 47 | Dalton Riggs | So |
| DS | 43 | Cannon Skidmore | Fr |
| P | 39 | Landon Rehkow | Fr |
| P | 35 | Sam Van Der Haar | So |
| K | 97 | Matthias Dunn | Fr |
| K | 44 | Will Ferrin | Jr |

Head coach

- Kalani Sitake (BYU)

Coordinators/assistant coaches

- Jay Hill (Utah)
  Associate head coach, Defensive coordinator/safeties
- Aaron Roderick (BYU)
  Offensive coordinator/quarterbacks
- Kelly Poppinga (BYU)
  Special teams coordinator/defensive ends
- TJ Woods (Azusa Pacific)
  Offensive line/Run game coordinator
- Fesi Sitake (Southern Utah)
  Passing Game Coordintor/wide receivers
- Kevin M. Gilbride(Hawaiʻi)
  Tight ends
- Harvey Unga (BYU)
  Running backs
- Justin Ena (BYU)
  Linebackers
- Jernaro Gilford (BYU)
  Cornerbacks
- Sione Po'uha (Utah)
  Defensive tackles

Legend

- (C) Team captain
- (S) Suspended
- (I) Ineligible
- Injured
- Redshirt

Roster

=== Depth chart ===
Defense

FS
Tanner Wall
Tommy Prassas
Faletau Satuala

| WLB | MLB | SLB |
|---|---|---|
| Jack Kelly | Harrison Taggart | Isaiah Glasker |
| Ace Kaufusi | Sione Moa | Choe Bryant-Strother |
| Miles Hall | Siale Esera | Aisea Moa |

SS
Crew Wakley
Micah Harper
Raider Damuni

CB
Jakob Robinson
Evan Johnson
Jayden Dunlap

| DE | DT | DT | DE |
|---|---|---|---|
| Tyler Batty | Blake Mangelson | John Nelson | Logan Lutui |
| Bodie Schoonover | Luke Toomalatai | Joshua Singh | Isaiah Bagnah |
| Viliami Po'uha | John Taumoepeau | David Latu | Ephraim Asiata |

CB
Marque Collins
Mory Bamba
Therrian Alexander III

Offense

X-Receiver
Chase Roberts
Kody Epps
Keelan Marion

| LT | LG | C | RG | RT |
|---|---|---|---|---|
| Caleb Etienne | Weylin Lapuaho | Connor Pay | Sonny Makasini | Brayden Keim |
| Isaiah Jatta | Bruce Mitchell | Jake Eichorn | Austin Leausa | Austin Leausa |
| Jake Griffin | Sione Hingano | Sam Dawe | Weston Jones | Kaden Chidester |

TE
Keanu Hill
Mata'ava Ta'ase
Ethan Erickson

Z-Receiver
Darius Lassiter
Parker Kingston
Jojo Phillips

QB
Jake Retzlaff
Gerry Bohanon
Treyson Bourguet

Key reserves
TE Ryner Swanson
RB Pokaiaua Haunga
DB Talan Alfrey
DB Ethan Slade
RB Sione I Moa
WR Cody Hagen
WR Tei Nacua
DB Jonathan Kabeya

RB
LJ Martin
Hinckley Ropati
Miles Davis

FB
Mason Fakahua
Ray Paulo
Nason Coleman

Special teams
PK Will Ferrin
PK Matthias Dunn
P Sam Vander Haar
P Landon Rehkow
KR Parker Kingston
KR Keelan Marion
PR Parker Kingston
PR Chase Roberts
LS Dalton Riggs
LS Cannon Skidmore
H Sam Vander Haar
H Landon Rehkow
