= Raider Damuni =

American football player (born 2002)

No. 3 – BYU Cougars
- Position: Safety
- Class: Senior

Personal information
- Born: January 31, 2002 (age 24)
- Listed height: 6 ft 1 in (1.85 m)
- Listed weight: 210 lb (95 kg)

Career information
- High school: Timpview (Provo, Utah)
- College: BYU (2023–present)
- Stats at ESPN

Raider Damuni (born January 31, 2002) is an American football safety for the BYU Cougars.

== Early life ==
Damuni attended Timpview High School in Provo, Utah. He was rated as a three-star recruit by 247Sports and committed to play college football for the BYU Cougars over offers from other schools such as Utah, Utah State, Wisconsin, Nebraska, Washington State, Arizona, and Oregon State.

== College football ==
As a freshman in 2023, Damuni totaled 21 tackles and a forced fumble. In the 2024 Alamo Bowl, he notched a sack in a win over Colorado. Damuni finished the 2024 season with 26 tackles with two and a half for a loss and a sack in 12 games. In week 2 of the 2025 season, Damuni hauled in an interception in a victory over Stanford. He finished the 2025 season with 43 tackles with half a tackle for a loss and an interception.

== Personal life ==
Damuni is the son of former BYU safety Jack Damuni.
