= 2024 Alamo Bowl =

Postseason college football bowl game

2024 Valero Alamo Bowl
- 32nd Alamo Bowl
BYU Cougars	Colorado Buffaloes
(10–2)	(9–3)
Big 12	Big 12
36	14
Head coach: Kalani Sitake	Head coach: Deion Sanders
AP / Coaches / CFP; 17 / 17 / 17	AP / Coaches / CFP; 20 / 22 / 23
	1	2	3	4	Total
BYU	10	10	7	9	36
Colorado	0	0	7	7	14
- Date: December 28, 2024
- Season: 2024
- Stadium: Alamodome
- Location: San Antonio, Texas
- MVP: Offense: LJ Martin (RB, BYU); Defense: Isaiah Glasker (LB, BYU)
- Favorite: Colorado by 2.5
- Referee: Kyle Olson (SEC)
- Attendance: 64,261

United States TV coverage
- Network: ABC; ESPN Radio
- Announcers: Dave Pasch (play-by-play), Dusty Dvoracek (analyst), and Taylor McGregor (sideline) (ABC); Jorge Sedano (play-by-play), Kelly Stouffer (analyst), and Ian Fitzsimmons (sideline) (ESPN Radio)

The 2024 Alamo Bowl was a college football bowl game played on December 28, 2024, at the Alamodome located in San Antonio, Texas. The 32nd annual Alamo Bowl featured the BYU Cougars and Colorado Buffaloes, both from the Big 12 Conference. The game began at approximately 6:30 p.m. CST and aired on ABC. The Alamo Bowl was one of the 2024–25 bowl games concluding the 2024 FBS football season. The game was sponsored by Valero Energy and was officially known as the Valero Alamo Bowl.

== Teams ==
Consistent with conference tie-ins, the game featured teams from the Big 12 Conference and the Pac-12 Conference legacy pool. The Alamo Bowl received the first selection of Big 12 teams not competing in the College Football Playoff (CFP) and the first selection from the Pac-12 legacy pool—that is, teams that were members of the Pac-12 during the 2023 season.

On December 4, bowl organizers announced that four teams remained under consideration for the Alamo Bowl: Iowa State and BYU from the Big 12, and Arizona State and Colorado from the Pac-12 legacy pool. As both Arizona State and Colorado became Big 12 members in 2024, the announcement made it likely that the Alamo Bowl would feature an unusual non-playoff bowl matchup of teams from the same conference. (Note: Following the 1979 Orange Bowl, contested between two Big Eight teams, two teams from the same conference did not meet in a bowl game until the 2015 Arizona Bowl, contested between two Mountain West teams. Later examples include the 2025 Birmingham Bowl, contested between two teams from the Sun Belt, and earlier examples date to at least the 1944 Rose Bowl, contested by two teams from the Pacific Coast Conference.)

=== BYU Cougars ===
BYU played to a 10–2 regular-season record (7–2 in conference). The Cougars started with nine consecutive wins and were ranked as high as sixth nationally. The team fell out of College Football Playoff (CFP) consideration with back-to-back losses. BYU faced two ranked FBS teams during the season, defeating Kansas State and losing to Arizona State. The Cougars entered the bowl ranked 17th in each of the major polls.

=== Colorado Buffaloes ===
Colorado posted a regular season record of 9–3 (7–2 in conference). The Buffalos were unranked until early November, entering the polls when they had a 6–2 record. The team faced one ranked FBS opponent, losing to Kansas State. Colorado was placed 23rd in the final CFP rankings, and entered the bowl 20th in the AP poll.

Colorado brought their live mascot Ralphie the Buffalo to the game, which marked Ralphie VI's final appearance at a football game before her retirement in August 2025.

== Game summary ==
2024 Valero Alamo Bowl

Quarter	1	2	3	4	Total
No. 17 BYU	10	10	7	9	36
No. 23 Colorado	0	0	7	7	14

at Alamodome • San Antonio, Texas

- Date: Saturday, December 28, 2024
- Game time: 6:40 p.m. CST
- Game weather: Indoor • Temperature: 74 °F (23 °C)
- Game attendance: 64,261
- Referee: Kyle Olson (SEC)
- TV announcers (ABC): Dave Pasch (play-by-play), Dusty Dvoracek (analyst), and Taylor McGregor (sideline)
- Box score

Game information

First quarter

- (7:10) BYU – LJ Martin 1-yard run, Will Ferrin kick (Drive: 6 plays, 52 yards, 3:46; BYU 7–0)
- (2:19) BYU – Will Ferrin 51-yard field goal (Drive: 7 plays, 8 yards, 2:29; BYU 10–0)

Second quarter

- (5:32) BYU – Parker Kingston 64-yard kickoff return, Will Ferrin kick (Drive: 3 plays, -13 yards, 2:39; BYU 17–0)
- (0:00) BYU – Will Ferrin 54-yard field goal (Drive: 9 plays, 40 yards, 3:05; BYU 20–0)

Third quarter

- (8:03) BYU – Sione Moa 13-yard run, Will Ferrin kick (Drive: 9 plays, 55 yards, 4:58; BYU 27–0)
- (6:14) COLO – Travis Hunter 43-yard pass from Shedeur Sanders, Alejandro Mata kick (Drive: 4 plays, 63 yards, 1:49; BYU 27–7)

Fourth quarter

- (10:27) BYU – LJ Martin 9-yard run, two-point conversion failed (Drive: 4 plays, 42 yards, 2:32; BYU 33–7)
- (5:28) BYU – Will Ferrin 31-yard field goal (Drive: 6 plays, 18 yards, 4:12; BYU 36–7)
- (2:17) COLO – Sav'ell Smalls 2-yard pass from Shedeur Sanders, Alejandro Mata kick (Drive: 7 plays, 82 yards, 3:11; BYU 36–14)

=== Statistics ===
Statistics	BYU	COLO
First downs	22	9
Plays–yards	65–331	42–210
Rushes–yards	42–180	19–2
Passing yards	151	208
Passing: comp–att–int	12–23–3	16–23–2
Time of possession	35:56	24:04

Team	Category	Player	Statistics
BYU	Passing	Jake Retzlaff	12/21, 151 yards
BYU	Rushing	LJ Martin	17 carries, 93 yards, 2 TD
BYU	Receiving	LJ Martin	2 receptions, 33 yards
Colorado	Passing	Shedeur Sanders	16/23, 208 yards, 2 TD, 2 INT
Colorado	Rushing	Micah Welch	5 carries, 25 yards
Colorado	Receiving	Travis Hunter	4 receptions, 106 yards, TD
