= 2024 Colorado Buffaloes football team =

American college football season

2024 Colorado Buffaloes football

Alamo Bowl, L 14–36 vs. BYU
- Conference: Big 12 Conference

Ranking
- Coaches: No. 25
- AP: No. 25
- Record: 9–4 (7–2 Big 12)
- Head coach: Deion Sanders (2nd season)
- Offensive coordinator: Pat Shurmur (2nd season)
- Offensive scheme: Multiple spread
- Defensive coordinator: Robert Livingston (1st season)
- Base defense: 4–3
- Home stadium: Folsom Field

Uniform

2024 Big 12 Conference football standings
	Conf.			Overall
Team	W		L	W		L
No. 7 Arizona State y$^	7	–	2	11	–	3
No. 15 Iowa State y	7	–	2	11	–	3
No. 13 BYU	7	–	2	11	–	2
No. 25 Colorado	7	–	2	9	–	4
Baylor	6	–	3	8	–	5
TCU	6	–	3	9	–	4
Texas Tech	6	–	3	8	–	5
Kansas State	5	–	4	9	–	4
West Virginia	5	–	4	6	–	7
Kansas	4	–	5	5	–	7
Cincinnati	3	–	6	5	–	7
Houston	3	–	6	4	–	8
Utah	2	–	7	5	–	7
UCF	2	–	7	4	–	8
Arizona	2	–	7	4	–	8
Oklahoma State	0	–	9	3	–	9
Championship: Arizona State 45, Iowa State 19
^ – College Football Playoff participant; $ – Conference champion; y – Championship game participant; Rankings from AP Poll

The 2024 Colorado Buffaloes football team represented the University of Colorado Boulder as a member of the Big 12 Conference during the 2024 NCAA Division I FBS football season. Colorado rejoined the Big 12 Conference after having originally being a charter member of the conference before leaving for the Pac-12 Conference in 2010. The Buffaloes were led by second-year head coach Deion Sanders. They played their home games on campus at Folsom Field in Boulder, Colorado.

Following a win over Cincinnati on October 26, the Buffaloes became bowl eligible for the first time since the shortened 2020 season and for the first time in a full season since 2016. Colorado was a contender to the Big 12 Championship and potentially the College Football Playoff. However, a loss to Kansas in week 13 and Arizona State, BYU, and Iowa State winning tiebreaker games the following week eliminated the Buffaloes from contention. Nevertheless, Colorado accepted an invitation to play in the Alamo Bowl against conference opponent BYU after the conclusion of the regular season where they were defeated by a score of 36–14. At the end of the season, the Buffaloes finished ranked 25 in the both final AP and Coaches polls, their first finish in the top 25 since 2016.

Cornerback and wide receiver Travis Hunter was awarded the Heisman Trophy for his performance during the season, becoming the second Buffalo to win the Heisman.

== Preseason ==
=== Spring game ===
The Colorado Buffaloes spring game was held on April 27, 2024, at Folsom Field. The game was televised by the Pac-12 Network. It was the last ever Colorado football game on that network.

Colorado Black vs Gold

Quarter	1	2	3	4	Total
Offense	12	11	6	0	29
Defense	3	18	3	0	24

at Folsom Field, Boulder, CO

- Date: April 27, 2024
- Game time: 1:00 p.m. MDT
- Game attendance: 28,424 (Note: Number indicates number of tickets sold.)
- TV: P12N

=== Big 12 media poll ===
The Big 12 media preseason poll was released on July 2, 2024. The Buffaloes were predicted to finish in 11th place in the conference.

== Schedule ==
The Colorado Buffaloes and the Big 12 announced the 2024 football schedule on January 30, 2024.

Date	Time	Opponent	Rank	Site	TV	Result	Attendance
August 29	6:00 p.m.	No. 2 (FCS) North Dakota State*		Folsom Field; Boulder, CO	ESPN	W 31–26	49,438
September 7	5:30 p.m.	at Nebraska*		Memorial Stadium; Lincoln, NE (rivalry)	NBC	L 10–28	86,906
September 14	5:30 p.m.	at Colorado State*		Canvas Stadium; Fort Collins, CO (Rocky Mountain Showdown)	CBS	W 28–9	40,099
September 21	6:00 p.m.	Baylor^{†}		Folsom Field; Boulder, CO	FOX	W 38–31 ^{OT}	52,794
September 28	1:30 p.m.	at UCF		FBC Mortgage Stadium; Orlando, FL (Big Noon Kickoff)	FOX	W 48–21	45,702
October 12	8:15 p.m.	No. 18 Kansas State		Folsom Field; Boulder, CO (rivalry)	ESPN	L 28–31	53,972
October 19	2:00 p.m.	at Arizona		Arizona Stadium; Tucson, AZ	FOX	W 34–7	50,724
October 26	8:15 p.m.	Cincinnati		Folsom Field; Boulder, CO	ESPN	W 34–23	53,202
November 9	2:00 p.m.	at Texas Tech	No. 20	Jones AT&T Stadium; Lubbock, TX (Big Noon Kickoff)	FOX	W 41–27	60,229
November 16	10:00 a.m.	Utah	No. 17	Folsom Field; Boulder, CO (Rumble in the Rockies, Big Noon Kickoff)	FOX	W 49–24	54,646
November 23	1:30 p.m.	at Kansas	No. 16	Arrowhead Stadium; Kansas City, MO	FOX	L 21–37	56,470
November 29	10:00 a.m.	Oklahoma State	No. 25	Folsom Field; Boulder, CO	ABC	W 52–0	51,030
December 28	5:30 p.m.	vs. No. 17 BYU*	No. 23	Alamodome; San Antonio, TX (Alamo Bowl)	ABC	L 14–36	64,261
*Non-conference game; ^{†}Homecoming; Rankings from AP (and CFP Rankings, after November 5) -; All times are in Mountain time

== Rankings ==
Ranking movements Legend: ██ Increase in ranking ██ Decrease in ranking — = Not ranked RV = Received votes
	Week																
Poll	Pre	1	2	3	4	5	6	7	8	9	10	11	12	13	14	15	Final
AP	RV	RV	—	—	—	RV	RV	—	—	23	21	18	16	23	20	20	25
Coaches	RV	—	—	—	RV	RV	RV	—	—	RV	24	20	18	RV	22	22	25
CFP	Not released										20	17	16	25	23	23	Not released

== Game summaries ==
=== vs. No. 2 (FCS) North Dakota State ===
Game One – No. 2 (FCS) North Dakota State Bison (0–0) at Colorado Buffaloes (0–0) – Game summary

Quarter	1	2	3	4	Total
No. 2 (FCS) Bison	10	10	0	6	26
Buffaloes	14	3	7	7	31

at Folsom Field • Boulder, CO

- Date: August 29, 2024
- Game time: 6:00 p.m. MDT
- Game weather: Clear; 75 °F (24 °C);
- Game attendance: 49,438
- Referee: Stephen Baron
- TV announcers (ESPN): Mark Jones (play-by-play), Roddy Jones (analyst), and Quint Kessenich (sideline)

Game information

First quarter

- (12:12) NDSU – Griffin Crosa 36-yard field goal (Drive: 6 plays, 57 yards, 2:48; North Dakota State 3–0)
- (9:30) COL – Travis Hunter 41-yard pass from Shedeur Sanders, Alejandro Mata kick (Drive: 6 plays, 75 yards, 2:41; Colorado 7–3)
- (3:59) NDSU – Joe Stoffel 7-yard pass from Cam Miller (Drive: 10 plays, 75 yards, 5:32; North Dakota State 10–7)
- (3:15) COL – Jimmy Horn Jr. 69-yard pass from Shedeur Sanders, Alejandro Mata kick (Drive: 2 plays, 75 yards, 0:44; Colorado 14–10)

Second quarter

- (12:07) NDSU – Cam Miller 7-yard run, Griffin Crosa kick (Drive: 10 plays, 77 yards, 6:08; North Dakota State 17–14)
- (4:33) NDSU – Griffin Crosa 31-yard field goal (Drive: 11 plays, 21 yards, 5:36; North Dakota State 20–14)
- (0:00) COL – Alejandro Mata 27-yard field goal (Drive: 8 plays, 89 yards, 0:56; North Dakota State 20–17)

Third quarter

- (9:30) COL – Travis Hunter 13-yard pass from Shedeur Sanders, Alejandro Mata kick (Drive: 5 plays, 72 yards, 2:04; Colorado 24–20)

Fourth quarter

- (7:57) COL – Travis Hunter 3-yard pass from Shedeur Sanders, Alejandro Mata kick (Drive: 17 plays, 80 yards, 8:10; Colorado 31–20)
- (2:19) NDSU – Cam Miller 20-yard run, Two-Point Pass Conversion Failed (Drive: 11 plays, 75 yards, 5:38; Colorado 31–26)

Statistics	NDSU	COLO
First downs	25	22
Total yards	449	504
Rushing yards	43–157	23–59
Passing yards	292	445
Passing: Comp–Att–Int	20–24–0	26–34–1
Time of possession	36:44	23:16

Team	Category	Player	Statistics
North Dakota State	Passing	Cam Miller	18/22, 277 yards, TD
North Dakota State	Rushing	Cam Miller	16 carries, 81 yards, 2 TD
North Dakota State	Receiving	Braylon Henderson	5 receptions, 72 yards
Colorado	Passing	Shedeur Sanders	26/34, 445 yards, 4 TD, INT
Colorado	Rushing	Dallan Hayden	9 carries, 20 yards
Colorado	Receiving	Jimmy Horn Jr.	7 receptions, 198 yards, TD

=== at Nebraska (rivalry) ===
Game Two – Colorado Buffaloes (1–0) at Nebraska Cornhuskers (0–0) – Game summary

Quarter	1	2	3	4	Total
Buffaloes	0	0	3	7	10
Cornhuskers	14	14	0	0	28

at Memorial Stadium • Lincoln, NE

- Date: September 7, 2024
- Game time: 5:30 p.m. MDT
- Game weather: 72 °F (22 °C)
- Game attendance: 86,906
- Referee: Mike McCabe
- TV announcers (NBC/Touchdown Radio): Paul Burmeister (play-by-play), Colt McCoy (analyst), and Kathryn Tappen (sideline)/Brett Dolan (play-by-play) and Gino Torretta (analyst)

Game information

First quarter

- (10:34) NEB – Dante Dowdell 12-yard run, Tristan Alvano kick (Drive: 7 plays, 49 yards, 3:22, Nebraska 7–0)
- (5:46) NEB – Tommi Hill 7-yard interception return, Tristan Alvano kick (Drive: 0:05, Nebraska 14–0)

Second quarter

- (6:44) NEB – Dante Dowdell 1-yard run, Tristan Alvano kick (Drive: 9 plays, 86 yards, 4:46, Nebraska 21–0)
- (0:40) NEB – Rahmir Johnson 18-yard pass from Dylan Raiola, Tristan Alvano kick (Drive: 3 plays, 70 yards, 0:45, Nebraska 28–0)

Third quarter

- (10:38) CU – Alejandro Mata 27-yard field goal (Drive: 8 plays, 49 yards, 2:46, Nebraska 28–3)

Fourth quarter

- (8:45) CU – LaJohntay Wester 5-yard pass from Shedeur Sanders, Alejandro Mata kick (Drive: 6 plays, 58 yards, 2:04, Nebraska 28–10)

Statistics	COLO	NEB
First downs	15	22
Total yards	260	334
Rushes/yards	22–16	35–149
Passing yards	244	185
Passing: Comp–Att–Int	23–40–1	23–30–0
Time of possession	24:39	35:21

Team	Category	Player	Statistics
Colorado	Passing	Shedeur Sanders	23/38, 244 yards, 1 TD, 1 INT
Colorado	Rushing	Dallan Hayden	5 carries, 32 yards
Colorado	Receiving	Travis Hunter	10 receptions, 110 yards
Nebraska	Passing	Dylan Raiola	23/30, 185 yards, 1 TD
Nebraska	Rushing	Dante Dowdell	17 carries, 77 yards, 2 TD
Nebraska	Receiving	Rahmir Johnson	8 receptions, 49 yards, TD

=== at Colorado State (Rocky Mountain Showdown) ===
Colorado Buffaloes (1–1) at Colorado State Rams (1–1) – Game summary

Quarter	1	2	3	4	Total
Buffaloes	0	14	7	7	28
Rams	3	0	0	6	9

at Canvas Stadium • Fort Collins, CO

- Date: September 14, 2024
- Game time: 5:30 p.m. MDT
- Game weather: Sunny; 87 °F (31 °C)
- Game attendance: 40,099
- Referee: Jonathan Noli
- TV announcers (CBS/Gridiron Radio): Rich Waltz (play-by-play), Ross Tucker (analyst), and Tiffany Blackmon (sideline)/Noah Britt (play-by-play), Jon Reynolds (analyst), and Rachel Vigil (sideline)

Game information

First quarter

- (07:21) CSU – Jordan Noyes 25-yard field goal (Drive: 8 plays, 48 yards, 04:39; Colorado State 3–0)

Second quarter

- (05:51) COL – LaJohntay Wester 4-yard pass from Shedeur Sanders, Alejandro Mata kick (Drive: 12 plays, 85 yards, 05:51; Colorado 7–3)
- (0:58) COL – LaJohntay Wester 34-yard pass from Shedeur Sanders, Alejandro Mata kick (Drive: 9 plays, 84 yards, 02:33; Colorado 14–3)

Third quarter

- (10:11) COL – Travis Hunter 2-yard pass from Shedeur Sanders, Alejandro Mata kick (Drive: 2 plays, 12 yards, 00:31; Colorado 21–3)

Fourth quarter

- (13:20) COL – Travis Hunter 21-yard pass from Shedeur Sanders, Alejandro Mata kick (Drive: 5 plays, 55 yards, 01:58; Colorado 28–3)
- (9:58) CSU – Justin Marshall 5-yard run (Drive: 6 plays, 75 yards, 03:22; Colorado 28–9)

Statistics	COL	CSU
First downs	23	17
Total yards	419	340
Rushes/yards	19–109	31–130
Passing yards	310	209
Passing: Comp–Att–Int	23–40–1	22–39–2
Time of possession	30:07	29:53

Team	Category	Player	Statistics
Colorado	Passing	Shedeur Sanders	36/39, 310 yards, 4 TD
Colorado	Rushing	Micah Welch	9 carries, 65 yards
Colorado	Receiving	Travis Hunter	10 receptions, 110 yards
Colorado State	Passing	Brayden Fowler-Nicolosi	23/30, 185 yards, TD
Colorado State	Rushing	Avery Morrow	3 carries, 67 yards
Colorado State	Receiving	Jamari Person	7 receptions, 51 yards

=== vs Baylor ===
Baylor Bears (2–1) vs Colorado Buffaloes (2–1) – Game summary

Quarter	1	2	3	4	OT	Total
Bears	3	21	0	7	0	31
Buffaloes	7	10	7	7	7	38

at Folsom Field • Boulder, CO

- Date: September 21, 2024
- Game time: 6:00 p.m. MDT
- Game weather: Cloudy, 62 °F (17 °C), NW 9 mph
- Game attendance: 52,794
- Referee: Mike McCabe
- TV announcers (FOX/ESPN Radio): Connor Onion (play-by-play) and Mark Helfrich (analyst)/Mike Couzens (play-by-play), Max Starks (analyst), and Mike Peasley (sideline)

Game information

First quarter

- (8:13) BAY – Isaiah Hankins 32-yard field goal (Drive: 5 plays, 23 yards, 2:02, Baylor 3–0)
- (1:56) COL – Shedeur Sanders 2-yard run, Alejandro Mata kick (Drive: 11 plays, 75 yards, 6:17, Colorado 7–3)

Second quarter

- (14:26) BAY – Monaray Baldwin 30-yard pass from Sawyer Robertson, Isaiah Hankins kick (Drive: 7 plays, 75 yards, 2:30, Baylor 10–7)
- (6:55) COL – Alejandro Mata 43-yard field goal (Drive: 10 plays, 55 yards, 4:41, Tied 10–10)
- (6:44) BAY – Jamaal Bell 100-yard kickoff return, Isaiah Hankins kick (Baylor 17–10)
- (4:19) BAY – Sawyer Robertson 45-yard run, Isaiah Hankins kick (Drive: 4 plays, 54 yards, 1:25, Baylor 24–10)
- (0:50) COL – Omarion Miller 58-yard pass from Shedeur Sanders, Alejandro Mata kick (Drive: 5 plays, 78 yards, 1:48, Baylor 24–17)

Third quarter

- (1:00) COL – Micah Welch 2-yard run, Alejandro Mata kick (Drive: 6 plays, 80 yards, 2:28, Tied 24–24)

Fourth quarter

- (5:43) BAY – Hal Presley 24-yard pass from Sawyer Robertson, Isaiah Hankins kick (Drive: 8 plays, 61 yards, 3:29, Baylor 31–24)
- (0:00) COL – LaJohntay Wester 43-yard pass from Shedeur Sanders, Alejandro Mata kick (Drive: 8 plays, 72 yards, 2:16, Tied 31–31)

Overtime

- (0:00) COL – Micah Welch 1-yard run, Alejandro Mata kick (Drive: 7 plays, 25 yards, 0:00, Colorado 38–31)

Statistics	BU	COLO
First downs	15	24
Total yards	314	432
Rushes/yards	41–166	42–92
Passing yards	148	341
Passing: Comp–Att–Int	11–21–0	25–41–0
Time of possession	23:52	36:08

Team	Category	Player	Statistics
Baylor	Passing	Sawyer Robertson	11/21, 148 yards, 2 TD
Baylor	Rushing	Sawyer Robertson	9 carries, 82 yards, TD
Baylor	Receiving	Hal Presley	2 receptions, 43 yards, TD
Colorado	Passing	Shedeur Sanders	25/41, 341 yards, 2 TD
Colorado	Rushing	Isaiah Augustave	12 carries, 41 yards
Colorado	Receiving	Travis Hunter	7 receptions, 130 yards

=== at UCF ===
Colorado Buffaloes (3–1) at UCF Knights (3–0) – Game summary

Quarter	1	2	3	4	Total
Buffaloes	14	13	14	7	48
Knights	7	7	7	0	21

at FBC Mortgage Stadium • Orlando, FL

- Date: September 28, 2024
- Game time: 1:30 p.m. MDT
- Game weather: Cloudy, 85 °F (29 °C)
- Game attendance: 45,702
- Referee: Tutashinda Salaam
- TV announcers (FOX): Kevin Kugler (play-by-play), Brock Huard (analyst), and Allison Williams (sideline)

Game information

First quarter

- (3:49) COL – Travis Hunter 23-yard pass from Shedeur Sanders, Alejandro Mata kick (Drive: 11 plays, 80 yards, 5:28; Colorado 7–0)
- (3:38) UCF – RJ Harvey 75-yard pass from KJ Jefferson, Colton Boomer kick (Drive: 1 plays, 75 yards, 0:11; Tied 7–7)
- (0:10) COL – Will Sheppard 47-yard pass from Shedeur Sanders, Alejandro Mata kick (Drive: 8 plays, 75 yards, 3:28; Colorado 14–7)

Second quarter

- (12:21) COL – Dallan Hayden 14-yard run, Alejandro Mata kick (Drive: 5 plays, 50 yards, 2:01; Colorado 21–7)
- (8:41) UCF – KJ Jefferson 7-yard run, Colton Boomer kick (Drive: 8 plays, 68 yards, 3:33; Colorado 21–14)
- (0:42) COL – Alejandro Mata 36-yard field goal (Drive: 8 plays, 68 yards, 3:02; Colorado 24–14)
- (0:00) COL – Alejandro Mata 46-yard field goal (Drive: 2 plays, 7 yards, 0:08; Colorado 27–14)

Third quarter

- (9:11) COL – Micah Welch 1-yard run, Alejandro Mata kick (Drive: 4 plays, 63 yards, 1:42; Colorado 34–14)
- (3:38) UCF – Xavier Townsend 15-yard pass from KJ Jefferson, Colton Boomer kick (Drive: 3 plays, 92 yards, 1:20; Colorado 34–21)
- (1:32) COL – LaJohntay Wester 10-yard pass from Shedeur Sanders, Alejandro Mata kick (Drive: 6 plays, 65 yards, 2:26; Colorado 41–21)

Fourth quarter

- (5:05) COL – Cam'Ron Silmon-Craig 95-yard fumble recovery, Alejandro Mata kick (Drive: 7 plays, 50 yards, 1:52; Colorado 48–21)

Statistics	COLO	UCF
First downs	26	14
Total yards	418	461
Rushes/yards	29–128	44–177
Passing yards	290	284
Passing: Comp–Att–Int	28–35–1	20–35–2
Time of possession	29:57	30:03

Team	Category	Player	Statistics
Colorado	Passing	Shedeur Sanders	28/35, 290 yards, 3 TD, INT
Colorado	Rushing	Isaiah Augustave	4 carries, 39 yards
Colorado	Receiving	Will Sheppard	4 receptions, 99 yards, TD
UCF	Passing	KJ Jefferson	20/35, 284 yards, 2 TD, 2 INT
UCF	Rushing	RJ Harvey	16 carries, 79 yards
UCF	Receiving	RJ Harvey	4 receptions, 92 yards, TD

=== vs No. 18т Kansas State (rivalry) ===
No. 18т Kansas State Wildcats (4–1) vs Colorado Buffaloes (4–1) – Game summary

Quarter	1	2	3	4	Total
No. 18т Wildcats	7	7	10	7	31
Buffaloes	7	0	7	14	28

at Folsom Field • Boulder, CO

- Date: October 12, 2024
- Game time: 8:15 p.m. MDT
- Game weather: Cloudy • Temperature: 68 °F (20 °C) • Wind: W at 6 miles per hour (9.7 km/h)
- Game attendance: 53,972
- Referee: David Alvarez
- TV announcers (ESPN): Mark Jones (play-by-play), Roddy Jones (analyst), and Quint Kessenich (sideline)

Game information

First quarter

- (7:06) COL – LaJohntay Wester 25-yard pass from Shedeur Sanders, Alejandro Mata kick (Drive: 9 plays, 49 yards, 4:02; Colorado 7–0)
- (0:44) KSU – Avery Johnson 8-yard run, Chris Tennant kick (Drive: 11 plays, 75 yards, 6:22; Tied 7–7)

Second quarter

- (1:52) KSU – Dylan Edwards 1-yard run, Chris Tennant kick (Drive: 8 plays, 60 yards, 3:26; Kansas State 14–7)

Third quarter

- (6:55) KSU – Jayce Brown 1-yard pass from Avery Johnson, Chris Tennant kick (Drive: 16 plays, 81 yards, 7:58; Kansas State 21–7)
- (4:44) COL – Will Sheppard 7-yard pass from Shedeur Sanders, Alejandro Mata kick (Drive: 7 plays, 75 yards, 2:11; Kansas State 21–14)
- (0:28) KSU – Chris Tennant 48-yard field goal (Drive: 8 plays, 27 yards, 4:09; Kansas State 24–14)

Fourth quarter

- (6:44) COL – Isaiah Augustave 2-yard run, Alejandro Mata kick (Drive: 11 plays, 72 yards, 4:37; Kansas State 24–21)
- (3:12) COL – LaJohntay Wester 11-yard pass from Shedeur Sanders, Alejandro Mata kick (Drive: 2 plays, 17 yards, 0:39; Colorado 28–24)
- (2:14) KSU – Jayce Brown 50-yard pass from Avery Johnson, Chris Tennant kick (Drive: 3 plays, 84 yards, 0:51; Kansas State 31–28)

Statistics	KSU	COLO
First downs	22	20
Total yards	423	359
Rushes/yards	43–185	19–-29
Passing yards	238	388
Passing: Comp–Att–Int	17–26–1	34–40–1
Time of possession	35:00	25:00

Team	Category	Player	Statistics
Kansas State	Passing	Avery Johnson	15/23, 224 yards, 2 TD, INT
Kansas State	Rushing	DJ Giddens	25 carries, 182 yards
Kansas State	Receiving	Jayce Brown	6 receptions, 121 yards, 2 TD
Colorado	Passing	Shedeur Sanders	34/40, 388 yards, 3 TD, INT
Colorado	Rushing	Dallan Hayden	7 carries, 11 yards
Colorado	Receiving	Omarion Miller	8 receptions, 145 yards

=== at Arizona ===
Colorado Buffaloes (4–2) at Arizona Wildcats (3–3) – Game summary

Quarter	1	2	3	4	Total
Buffaloes	14	14	3	3	34
Wildcats	7	0	0	0	7

at Arizona Stadium • Tucson, AZ

- Date: October 19, 2024
- Game time: 2:00 p.m. MDT
- Game weather: Cloudy, 68 °F (20 °C)
- Game attendance: 50,724
- Referee: Cravonne Barrett
- TV announcers (FOX): Jason Benetti (play-by-play), Brock Huard (analyst), and Allison Williams (sideline)

Game information

First quarter

- (12:37) COL – Isaiah Augustave 1-yard run, Alejandro Mata kick (Drive: 5 plays, 46 yards, 2:21; Colorado 7–0)
- (6:16) COL – Drelon Miller 1-yard pass from Shedeur Sanders, Alejandro Mata kick (Drive: 9 plays, 63 yards, 4:52; Colorado 14–0)
- (1:17) ARIZ – Chris Hunter 1-yard pass from Noah Fifita, Tyler Loop kick (Drive: 10 plays, 75 yards, 4:54; Colorado 14–7)

Second quarter

- (13:03) COL – Will Sheppard 16-yard pass from Shedeur Sanders, Alejandro Mata kick (Drive: 11 plays, 75 yards, 3:14; Colorado 21–7)
- (1:07) COL – Shedeur Sanders 6-yard run, Alejandro Mata kick (Drive: 7 plays, 31 yards, 1:36; Colorado 28–7)

Third quarter

- (5:58) COL – Alejandro Mata 28-yard field goal (Drive: 9 plays, 76 yards, 4:04; Colorado 31–7)

Fourth quarter

- (4:42) COL – Alejandro Mata 34-yard field goal (Drive: 4 plays, 7 yards, 1:42; Colorado 34–7)

Statistics	COLO	ARIZ
First downs	21	16
Total yards	398	245
Rushes/yards	39–148	34–107
Passing yards	250	138
Passing: Comp–Att–Int	23–34–2	16–26–1
Time of possession	30:34	29:26

Team	Category	Player	Statistics
Colorado	Passing	Shedeur Sanders	23/23, 250 yards, 2 TD, 2 INT
Colorado	Rushing	Charlie Offerdahl	7 carries, 56 yards
Colorado	Receiving	LaJohntay Wester	8 receptions, 127 yards
Arizona	Passing	Noah Fifita	16/26, 138 yards, 1 TD, 1 INT
Arizona	Rushing	Noah Fifita	12 carries, 24 yards
Arizona	Receiving	Tetairoa McMillan	5 receptions, 38 yards

=== vs Cincinnati ===
Cincinnati Bearcats (5–2) vs Colorado Buffaloes (5–2) – Game summary

Quarter	1	2	3	4	Total
Bearcats	7	7	0	9	23
Buffaloes	14	10	7	3	34

at Folsom Field • Boulder, CO

- Date: October 26, 2024
- Game time: 8:15 p.m. MDT
- Game weather: Clear, 55 °F (13 °C)
- Game attendance: 53,202
- Referee: Henry Johns
- TV announcers (ESPN): Mark Jones (play-by-play), Roddy Jones (analyst), and Quint Kessenich (sideline)

Game information

First quarter

- (9:32) COL – Travis Hunter 3-yard pass from Shedeur Sanders, Alejandro Mata kick (Drive: 11 plays, 64 yards, 4:54; Colorado 7–0)
- (6:01) CIN – Tony Johnson 6-yard pass from Brendan Sorsby, Nathan Hawks kick (Drive: 7 plays, 74 yards, 3:24; Tied 7–7)
- (0:00) COL – Shedeur Sanders 4-yard run, Alejandro Mata kick (Drive: 12 plays, 90 yards, 5:54; Colorado 14–7)

Second quarter

- (9:31) CIN – Evan Pryor 13-yard run, Nathan Hawks kick (Drive: 10 plays, 72 yards, 5:22; Tied 14–14)
- (3:28) COL – Alejandro Mata 28-yard field goal (Drive: 13 plays, 64 yards, 6:03; Colorado 17–14)
- (0:03) COL – Travis Hunter 34-yard pass from Shedeur Sanders, Alejandro Mata kick (Drive: 5 plays, 54 yards, 0:30; Colorado 24–14)

Third quarter

- (5:41) COL – Isaiah Augustave 7-yard run, Alejandro Mata kick (Drive: 6 plays, 62 yards, 3:10; Colorado 31–14)

Fourth quarter

- (9:20) CIN – Nathan Hawks 32-yard field goal (Drive: 13 plays, 75 yards, 6:04; Colorado 31–17)
- (3:51) CIN – Joe Royer 6-yard pass from Brendan Sorsby, two-point conversion failed (Drive: 11 plays, 81 yards, 3:39; Colorado 31–23)
- (1:39) COL – Alejandro Mata 47-yard field goal (Drive: 7 plays, 60 yards, 2:11; Colorado 34–23)

Statistics	CIN	COL
First downs	22	25
Total yards	351	446
Rushes/yards	32–171	40–123
Passing yards	180	323
Passing: Comp–Att–Int	16–30–0	25–31–0
Time of possession	27:18	32:42

Team	Category	Player	Statistics
Cincinnati	Passing	Brendan Sorsby	16/30, 180 yards, 2 TD
Cincinnati	Rushing	Corey Kiner	17 carries, 94 yards
Cincinnati	Receiving	Tony Johnson	4 receptions, 54 yards, TD
Colorado	Passing	Shedeur Sanders	25/30, 323 yards, 2 TD
Colorado	Rushing	Isaiah Augustave	22 carries, 91 yards, TD
Colorado	Receiving	Travis Hunter	9 receptions, 153 yards, 2 TD

=== at Texas Tech ===
No. 20 Colorado Buffaloes (6–2) at Texas Tech Red Raiders (6–3) – Game summary

Quarter	1	2	3	4	Total
No. 20 Buffaloes	0	10	21	10	41
Red Raiders	13	0	7	7	27

at Jones AT&T Stadium • Lubbock, TX

- Date: November 9, 2024
- Game time: 2:00 p.m. MST
- Game weather: Sunny, 60 °F (16 °C)
- Game attendance: 60,229
- Referee: Tutashinda Salaam
- TV announcers (FOX): Jason Benetti (play-by-play), Brock Huard (analyst), and Allison Williams (sideline)

Game information

First quarter

- (13:50) TTU – Jalin Conyers 17-yard pass from Behren Morton, Gino Garcia kick (Drive: 4 plays, 54 yards, 1:04; Texas Tech 7–0)
- (7:04) TTU – Gino Garcia 53-yard field goal (Drive: 9 plays, 43 yards, 4:03; Texas Tech 10–0)
- (2:28) TTU – Gino Garcia 39-yard field goal (Drive: 8 plays, 32 yards, 3:33; Texas Tech 13–0)

Second quarter

- (7:33) COL – LaJohntay Wester 23-yard pass from Shedeur Sanders, Alejandro Mata kick (Drive: 6 plays, 58 yards, 2:28; Texas Tech 13–7)
- (0:30) COL – Alejandro Mata 25-yard field goal (Drive: 12 plays, 74 yards, 4:11; Texas Tech 13–10)

Third quarter

- (11:00) COL – Shedeur Sanders 7-yard run, Alejandro Mata kick (Drive: 9 plays, 75 yards, 4:00; Colorado 17–13)
- (7:52) TTU – Tahj Brooks 2-yard run, Gino Garcia kick (Drive: 9 plays, 66 yards, 3:03; Texas Tech 20–17)
- (4:25) COL – Will Sheppard 5-yard pass from Shedeur Sanders, Alejandro Mata kick (Drive: 7 plays, 73 yards, 3:22; Colorado 24–20)
- (1:18) COL – Travis Hunter 23-yard pass from Shedeur Sanders, Alejandro Mata kick (Drive: 4 plays, 31 yards, 1:58; Colorado 31–20)

Fourth quarter

- (9:46) COL – Alejandro Mata 33-yard field goal (Drive: 5 plays, 24 yards, 1:49; Colorado 34–20)
- (2:12) TTU – Jalin Conyers 21-yard pass from Behren Morton, Gino Garcia kick (Drive: 6 plays, 43 yards, 1:32; Colorado 34–27)
- (0:51) COL – Shilo Sanders 6-yard fumble recovery, Alejandro Mata kick (Drive: 0 plays, 0 yards, 0:00; Colorado 41–27)

Statistics	COL	TTU
First downs	22	25
Total yards	351	388
Rushes/yards	27–60	46–113
Passing yards	291	275
Passing: Comp–Att–Int	30–43–0	24–41–1
Time of possession	29:36	30:24

Team	Category	Player	Statistics
Colorado	Passing	Shedeur Sanders	30/43, 291 yards, 3 TD
Colorado	Rushing	Shedeur Sanders	9 carries, 16 yards, TD
Colorado	Receiving	Travis Hunter	9 receptions, 99 yards, TD
Texas Tech	Passing	Behren Morton	24/40, 275 yards, 2 TD, INT
Texas Tech	Rushing	Tahj Brooks	31 carries, 137 yards, TD
Texas Tech	Receiving	Josh Kelly	8 receptions, 106 yards

=== vs Utah (Rumble in the Rockies) ===
Utah Utes (4–5) vs No. 17 Colorado Buffaloes (7–2) – Game summary

Quarter	1	2	3	4	Total
Utes	3	6	7	8	24
No. 17 Buffaloes	14	7	7	21	49

at Folsom Field • Boulder, CO

- Date: November 16, 2024
- Game time: 10:00 a.m. MST
- Game weather: Sunny, 50 °F (10 °C)
- Game attendance: 54,646
- Referee: Kevin Boltmann
- TV announcers (FOX/ESPN Radio): Gus Johnson (play-by-play), Joel Klatt (analyst), and Jenny Taft (sideline)/Marc Kestecher (play-by-play), Kelly Stouffer (analyst), and Ian Fitzsimmons (sideline)

Game information

First quarter

- (10:08) UTAH – Cole Becker 32-yard field goal (Drive: 7 plays, 7 yards, 4:44; Utah 3–0)
- (7:51) COLO – Will Sheppard 40-yard pass from Shedeur Sanders, Alejandro Mata kick (Drive: 5 plays, 58 yards, 2:09; Colorado 7–3)
- (5:49) COLO – LaJohntay Wester 76-yard kickoff return, Alejandro Mata kick (Drive: 0 plays, 0 yards, 0:00; Colorado 14–3)

Second quarter

- (5:35) UTAH – Cole Becker 34-yard field goal (Drive: 4 plays, 7 yards, 1:44; Colorado 14–6)
- (0:49) COLO – Will Sheppard 6-yard pass from Shedeur Sanders, Alejandro Mata kick (Drive: 14 plays, 85 yards, 4:40; Colorado 21–6)
- (0:00) UTAH – Cole Becker 47-yard field goal (Drive: 7 plays, 36 yards, 0:44; Colorado 21–9)

Third quarter

- (11:43) COLO – Isaiah Augustave 37-yard run, Alejandro Mata kick (Drive: 1 play, 37 yards, 0:08; Colorado 28–9)
- (6:10) UTAH – Dorian Singer 40-yard pass from Isaac Wilson, Cole Becker kick (Drive: 1 play, 40 yards, 0:09; Colorado 28–16)

Fourth quarter

- (13:58) COLO – Drelon Miller 47-yard pass from Shedeur Sanders, Alejandro Mata kick (Drive: 7 plays, 75 yards, 2:44; Colorado 35–16)
- (8:34) UTAH – Caleb Lohner 3-yard pass from Isaac Wilson, Spencer Fano run for two-point conversion (Drive: 8 plays, 75 yards, 5:24; Colorado 35–24)
- (4:32) COLO – Charlie Offerdahl 4-yard run, Alejandro Mata kick (Drive: 5 plays, 63 yards, 1:22; Colorado 42–24)
- (2:22) COLO – Travis Hunter 5-yard run, Alejandro Mata kick (Drive: 2 plays, 19 yards, 0:50; Colorado 49–24)

Statistics	UTAH	COL
First downs	15	17
Total yards	272	405
Rushes/yards	30–31	20–65
Passing yards	241	340
Passing: Comp–Att–Int	22–41–3	30–41–1
Time of possession	35:38	23:55

Team	Category	Player	Statistics
Utah	Passing	Isaac Wilson	21/40, 236 yards, 2 TD, 3 INT
Utah	Rushing	Mike Mitchell	7 carries, 28 yards
Utah	Receiving	Carsen Ryan	4 receptions, 78 yards
Colorado	Passing	Shedeur Sanders	30/41, 340 yards, 3 TD, INT
Colorado	Rushing	Isaiah Augustave	7 carries, 59 yards
Colorado	Receiving	Drelon Miller	6 receptions, 108 yards, TD

=== at Kansas ===
No. 16 Colorado Buffaloes (8–2) at Kansas Jayhawks (4–6) – Game summary

Quarter	1	2	3	4	Total
No. 16 Buffaloes	0	14	7	0	21
Jayhawks	10	13	7	7	37

at Arrowhead Stadium • Kansas City, MO

- Date: November 23, 2024
- Game time: 1:30 p.m. MST
- Game weather: Sunny, 58 °F (14 °C)
- Game attendance: 56,470
- Referee: Kevin Mar
- TV announcers (FOX): Jason Benetti (play-by-play), Brock Huard (analyst), and Allison Williams (sideline)

Game information

First quarter

- (11:44) KAN – Devin Neal 51-yard pass from Jalon Daniels, Tabor Allen kick (Drive: 6 plays, 73 yards, 3:11; Kansas 7–0)
- (2:39) KAN – Tabor Allen 24-yard field goal (Drive: 13 plays, 61 yards, 7:46; Kansas 10–0)

Second quarter

- (9:02) KAN – Devin Neal 9-yard run, Tabor Allen kick (Drive: 8 plays, 61 yards, 4:44; Kansas 17–0)
- (7:18) COLO – Travis Hunter 51-yard pass from Shedeur Sanders, Alejandro Mata kick (Drive: 4 plays, 75 yards, 1:44; Kansas 17–7)
- (3:47) KAN – Tabor Allen 23-yard field goal (Drive: 8 plays, 69 yards, 3:27; Kansas 20–7)
- (1:51) COLO – Drelon Miller 19-yard pass from Shedeur Sanders, Alejandro Mata kick (Drive: 5 plays, 75 yards, 1:56; Kansas 20–14)
- (0:07) KAN – Tabor Allen 25-yard field goal (Drive: 12 plays, 73 yards, 1:39; Kansas 23–14)

Third quarter

- (11:59) COLO – Travis Hunter 26-yard pass from Shedeur Sanders, Alejandro Mata kick (Drive: 6 plays, 51 yards, 2:53; Kansas 23–21)
- (7:18) KAN – Devin Neal 1-yard run, Tabor Allen kick (Drive: 10 plays, 80 yards, 4:36; Kansas 30–21)

Fourth quarter

- (11:47) KAN – Devin Neal 2-yard run, Tabor Allen kick (Drive: 14 plays, 70 yards, 8:07; Kansas 37–21)

Statistics	COL	KU
First downs	15	26
Total yards	308	520
Rushes/yards	13–42	57–331
Passing yards	266	189
Passing: Comp–Att–Int	23–29–0	14–21–0
Time of possession	19:49	40:11

Team	Category	Player	Statistics
Colorado	Passing	Shedeur Sanders	23/29, 266 yards, 3 TD
Colorado	Rushing	Shedeur Sanders	4 carries, 26 yards
Colorado	Receiving	Travis Hunter	8 receptions, 125 yards, 2 TD
Kansas	Passing	Jalon Daniels	14/21, 189 yards, TD
Kansas	Rushing	Devin Neal	37 carries, 207 yards, 3 TD
Kansas	Receiving	Devin Neal	4 receptions, 80 yards, TD

=== vs Oklahoma State ===
Oklahoma State Cowboys (3–8) vs No. 25 Colorado Buffaloes (8–3) – Game summary

Quarter	1	2	3	4	Total
Cowboys	0	0	0	0	0
No. 25 Buffaloes	21	0	17	14	52

at Folsom Field • Boulder, CO

- Date: November 29, 2024
- Game time: 10:00 a.m. MST
- Game weather: Sunny, 33 °F (1 °C)
- Game attendance: 51,030
- Referee: David Alvarez
- TV announcers (ABC): Mark Jones (play-by-play), Roddy Jones (analyst), and Quint Kessenich (sideline)

Game information

First quarter

- (12:03) COLO – Micah Welch 1-yard run, Alejandro Mata kick (Drive: 3 plays, 24 yards, 1:12; Colorado 7–0)
- (3:47) COLO – LaJohntay Wester 10-yard pass from Shedeur Sanders, Alejandro Mata kick (Drive: 11 plays, 65 yards, 5:48; Colorado 14–0)
- (2:09) COLO – Travis Hunter 11-yard pass from Shedeur Sanders, Alejandro Mata kick (Drive: 3 plays, 28 yards, 1:14; Colorado 21–0)

Second quarter

- None

Third quarter

- (14:02) COLO – LaJohntay Wester 69-yard pass from Shedeur Sanders, Alejandro Mata kick (Drive: 3 plays, 75 yards, 0:58; Colorado 28–0)
- (10:50) COLO – Travis Hunter 8-yard pass from Shedeur Sanders, Alejandro Mata kick (Drive: 4 plays, 25 yards, 1:43; Colorado 35–0)
- (4:31) COLO – Alejandro Mata 33-yard field goal (Drive: 8 plays, 42 yards, 3:52; Colorado 38–0)

Fourth quarter

- (14:25) COLO – DJ McKinney 13-yard interception return, Cristiano Palazzo kick (Drive: 2 plays, -6 yards, 0:35; Colorado 45–0)
- (11:05) COLO – Travis Hunter 23-yard pass from Shedeur Sanders, Alejandro Mata kick (Drive: 6 plays, 69 yards, 2:21; Colorado 52–0)

Statistics	OKST	COL
First downs	10	26
Total yards	147	471
Rushes/yards	31–70	29–33
Passing yards	77	438
Passing: Comp–Att–Int	12–34–2	34–42–1
Time of possession	27:31	32:29

Team	Category	Player	Statistics
Oklahoma State	Passing	Maealiuaki Smith	11/29, 70 yards
Oklahoma State	Rushing	Trent Howland	9 carries, 57 yards
Oklahoma State	Receiving	Brennan Presley	8 receptions, 42 yards
Colorado	Passing	Shedeur Sanders	34/41, 438 yards, 5 TD, INT
Colorado	Rushing	Micah Welch	12 carries, 39 yards, TD
Colorado	Receiving	LaJohntay Wester	11 receptions, 175 yards, 2 TD

=== vs No. 17 BYU (Alamo Bowl) ===
2024 Valero Alamo Bowl
No. 17 BYU Cougars (10–2) vs No. 23 Colorado Buffaloes (9–3) – Game summary

Quarter	1	2	3	4	Total
No. 17 Cougars	10	10	7	9	36
No. 23 Buffaloes	0	0	7	7	14

at Alamodome • San Antonio, TX

- Date: December 28, 2024
- Game time: 5:30 p.m. MST
- Game weather: Indoors
- Game attendance: 64,261
- Referee: Kyle Olson (SEC)
- TV announcers (ABC/ESPN Radio): Dave Pasch (play-by-play), Dusty Dvoracek (analyst), and Taylor McGregor (sideline)/Jorge Sedano (play-by-play), Kelly Stouffer (analyst), and Ian Fitzsimmons (sideline)

Game information

First quarter

- (7:10) BYU – LJ Martin 1-yard run, Will Ferrin kick (Drive: 6 plays, 52 yards, 3:46; BYU 7–0)
- (2:19) BYU – Will Ferrin 51-yard field goal (Drive: 7 plays, 8 yards, 2:29; BYU 10–0)

Second quarter

- (5:32) BYU – Parker Kingston 64-yard kickoff return, Will Ferrin kick (Drive: 3 plays, -13 yards, 2:39; BYU 17–0)
- (0:00) BYU – Will Ferrin 54-yard field goal (Drive: 9 plays, 40 yards, 3:05; BYU 20–0)

Third quarter

- (8:03) BYU – Sione Moa 13-yard run, Will Ferrin kick (Drive: 9 plays, 55 yards, 4:58; BYU 27–0)
- (6:14) COLO – Travis Hunter 43-yard pass from Shedeur Sanders, Alejandro Mata kick (Drive: 4 plays, 63 yards, 1:49; BYU 27–7)

Fourth quarter

- (10:27) BYU – LJ Martin 9-yard run, two-point conversion failed (Drive: 4 plays, 42 yards, 2:32; BYU 33–7)
- (5:28) BYU – Will Ferrin 31-yard field goal (Drive: 6 plays, 18 yards, 4:12; BYU 36–7)
- (2:17) COLO – Sav'ell Smalls 2-yard pass from Shedeur Sanders, Alejandro Mata kick (Drive: 7 plays, 82 yards, 3:11; BYU 36–14)

Statistics	BYU	COLO
First downs	22	9
Total yards	331	210
Rushes/yards	42–180	19–2
Passing yards	151	208
Passing: Comp–Att–Int	12–23–3	16–23–2
Time of possession	35:56	24:04

Team	Category	Player	Statistics
BYU	Passing	Jake Retzlaff	12/21, 151 yards
BYU	Rushing	LJ Martin	17 carries, 93 yards, 2 TD
BYU	Receiving	LJ Martin	2 receptions, 33 yards
Colorado	Passing	Shedeur Sanders	16/23, 208 yards, 2 TD, 2 INT
Colorado	Rushing	Micah Welch	5 carries, 25 yards
Colorado	Receiving	Travis Hunter	4 receptions, 106 yards, TD

== Personnel ==
=== Roster ===
2024 Colorado Buffaloes football team roster
Players
Coaches
Offense

Pos.	#	Name	Class
QB	2	Shedeur Sanders	Sr
QB	3	Dominiq Ponder	Fr
WR	4	Omarion Miller	So
WR	5	Jimmy Horn Jr.	Sr
WR	6	Drelon Miller	Fr
RB	7	Dallan Hayden	So
QB	8	Destin Wade	So
QB	9	Walter Taylor III	So
WR	10	LaJohntay Wester	Sr
WR	13	Kaleb Mathis	So
QB	14	Colton Allen	So
WR	14	Will Sheppard	GS
WR	15	Cordale Russell	Fr
QB	16	Ryan Staub	Fr
WR	18	Kam Mikell	Fr
RB	23	Isaiah Augustave	So
RB	26	Brandon Hood	Fr
WR	28	Asaad Waseem	Fr
RB	29	Micah Welch	Fr
TE	31	Sav'ell Smalls	Jr
WR	32	Tagert Bardin	Fr
RB	34	Titus Bautista	Fr
TE	35	Antonio Posadas	Fr
WR	36	Carson Westbrook	Fr
TE	37	Morgan Pearson	Fr
RB	44	Charlie Offerdahl	Jr
WR	45	Ronald Coleman	Fr
WR	47	Gavin Marsh	Fr
RB	48	Christian Sarem	So
C	51	Yakiri Walker	Jr
OL	52	Cash Cleveland	Fr
OT	54	Phillip Houston	Jr
OT	55	Kareem Harden	Jr
G	56	Tyler Brown	Sr
C	58	Hank Zilinskas	So
G	59	Yahya Attia	Fr
OL	66	Justin Mayers	GS
OL	67	Kahlil Benson	Jr
G	70	Wyatt Hummel	GS
G	71	Payton Kirkland	Fr
OT	72	Ben Reznik	Jr
G	74	Tyler Johnson	GS
G	75	Zack Owens	Fr
OT	76	Jordan Seaton	Fr
WR	80	Jordan Onovughe	Fr
TE	81	Sam Hart	GS
TE	82	Terrell Timmons Jr.	Jr
TE	86	Brady Kopetz	So
TE	87	Charlie Williams	Fr

Defense

Pos.	#	Name	Class
CB	3	Colton Hood	Fr
S	4	Travis Jay	Sr
S	5	RJ Johnson	Fr
S	6	Herman Smith III	Sr
S	7	Cam'Ron Silmon-Craig	Sr
CB	8	DJ McKinney	So
S	9	Savion Riley	So
CB/WR	12	Travis Hunter	Jr
CB	17	Isaiah Hardge	Fr
ILB	20	LaVonta Bentley	GS
S	21	Shilo Sanders	GS
ILB	22	Johnny Chaney Jr.	Sr
S	23	Carter Stoutmire	So
CB	24	Preston Hodge	Sr
ILB	25	Jaylen Wester	Jr
DE	27	Keaten Wade	Jr
S	28	Ben Finneseth	Jr
CB	29	Ivan Yates	GS
CB	30	Braden Keith	So
CB	31	Malakai Murphy	Fr
CB	33	Kole Mathis	Fr
CB	34	Nahmier Robinson	Fr
DE	35	B. J. Green	Sr
S	36	Nathaniel Watson	Fr
S	37	Ian Massey	GS
ILB	38	Brendan Gant	GS
CB	39	Ben Bouzi	Fr
DE	40	Taje McCoy	Fr
ILB	41	Nikhai Hill-Green	GS
ILB	42	Jeremiah Brown	Sr
ILB	43	Trevor Woods	Sr
ILB	46	Trenton Hood	Fr
DT	47	Rayyan Buell	GS
CB	48	Angel Lopez	Fr
DE	49	Quency Wiggins	So
DE	50	Dayon Hayes	GS
DE	53	Arden Walker	Jr
ILB	54	Bo Simmons-Lapena	So
ILB	55	Gage Goldberg	Fr
ILB	57	Kyeran Garcia	Fr
DE	58	Nikhil Webb Walker	So
DE	59	Tristan Marois	Jr
DT	88	Amari McNeill	Jr
DT	90	Taurean Carter II	GS
DE	91	Brandon Davis-Swain	Fr
DT	92	Anquin Barnes Jr.	Jr
DE	93	Samuel Okunlola	So
DT	95	Tawfiq Thomas	Jr
DT	96	Chijoke Nwankwo	Fr
DT	97	Chidozie Nwankwo	Sr
DL	99	Shane Coakes	GS

Special teams

Pos.	#	Name	Class
P	15	Mark Vassett	Sr
K	16	Alejandro Mata	Jr
K/P	17	Jace Feely	Jr
K	18	Alexander Stoyanovich	Fr
K/P	38	Daniel Gerlach	So
LS	39	Kameron Hawkins	Sr
LS	60	Aiden DeCorte	Fr
LS	79	Camden Dempsey	Jr
LS	96	Gabe Landers	So
K	98	Cristiano Palazzo	Jr

Head coach

- Deion Sanders

Coordinators/assistant coaches

- Gary Harrell – Assistant head coach/Running backs
- Robert Livingston – Defensive coordinator/Safeties
- Pat Shurmur – Offensive coordinator/Quarterbacks
- Brett Bartolone – Tight ends
- Vincent Dancy – Defensive ends
- Andre' Hart – Linebackers
- Damione Lewis – Defensive line
- Phil Loadholt – Offensive line
- Kevin Mathis – Cornerbacks
- Jason Phillips – Wide receivers
- Tommie Robinson – Director, quality control
- George Helow – Senior defensive coach
- Warren Sapp – Senior quality control, defense
- Anthony Balancier – Quality control, defense
- Gabe Lynn – Quality control, defense
- Michael Pollock – Quality control, offense
- Gunnar White – Quality control, offense
- Andrew Zimmer – Quality control analyst
- Rashad Davis – Graduate assistant
- Josh Jynes – Graduate assistant
- Maurice Sims – Director, sports performance

Legend

- (C) Team captain
- (S) Suspended
- (I) Ineligible
- Injured
- Redshirt

Roster
Last update: 9/30/24

=== Recruiting class ===
College recruiting (2024)
Name	Hometown	School	Height	Weight	Commit date
Jordan Seaton; OT	Bradenton, FL	IMG Academy	6 ft 5 in (1.96 m)	310 lb (140 kg)	Dec 7, 2023
Jordan Seaton; OT	Recruit ratings: Rivals: 247Sports: ESPN: (90)				
Dre'lon Miller; ATH	Silsbee, TX	Silsbee High School	6 ft 0 in (1.83 m)	205 lb (93 kg)	Dec 10, 2023
Dre'lon Miller; ATH	Recruit ratings: Rivals: 247Sports: ESPN: (84)				
Kamron Mikell; ATH	Statesboro, GA	Statesboro High School	6 ft 1 in (1.85 m)	180 lb (82 kg)	Nov 23, 2023
Kamron Mikell; ATH	Recruit ratings: Rivals: 247Sports: ESPN: (83)				
Brandon Davis-Swain; DE	West Bloomfield, MI	West Bloomfield High School	6 ft 3 in (1.91 m)	250 lb (110 kg)	Jun 10, 2023
Brandon Davis-Swain; DE	Recruit ratings: Rivals: 247Sports: ESPN: (82)				
Eric Brantley; DE	Valdosta, GA	Valdosta High School	6 ft 2 in (1.88 m)	250 lb (110 kg)	Dec 28, 2022
Eric Brantley; DE	Recruit ratings: Rivals: 247Sports: ESPN: (79)				
Omar White; DT	Valdosta, GA	Valdosta High School	6 ft 3 in (1.91 m)	325 lb (147 kg)	Dec 28, 2022
Omar White; DT	Recruit ratings: Rivals: 247Sports: ESPN: (79)				
Zycarl Lewis; WR	Venice, FL	Venice High School	5 ft 10 in (1.78 m)	165 lb (75 kg)	Jun 11, 2023
Zycarl Lewis; WR	Recruit ratings: Rivals: 247Sports: ESPN: (79)				
Micah Welch; RB	Milledgeville, GA	Baldwin High School	5 ft 7 in (1.70 m)	210 lb (95 kg)	Jun 12, 2023
Micah Welch; RB	Recruit ratings: Rivals: 247Sports: ESPN: (77)				
Kyeran Garcia; LB	Fort Myers, FL	Dunbar High School	6 ft 2 in (1.88 m)	215 lb (98 kg)	Feb 7, 2024
Kyeran Garcia; LB	Recruit ratings: Rivals: 247Sports: ESPN: (73)				
Overall recruit ranking: Rivals: #55 247Sports: #23
Note: In many cases, Scout, Rivals, 247Sports, On3, and ESPN may conflict in their listings of height and weight.; In these cases, the average was taken. ESPN grades are on a 100-point scale.; Sources: "Rivals commits". Rivals.; "ESPN commits". ESPN.; "2024 Team Ranking". Rivals.com.; "247Sports commits". 247Sports.

=== Transfers ===
==== Outgoing ====
Player	Position	New school
Alton McCaskill	RB	Arizona State
Chamon Metayer	TE	Arizona State
Marvin Ham	LB	Arkansas State
Jahquez Robinson	S	Auburn
Isaiah Jatta	OT	BYU
Victory Johnson	LB	Cal Poly
Cole Boscia	WR	California
Adam Hopkins	CB	Charlotte
Jeremiah McCrimmon	OT	Coahoma CC
Caleb Fauria	TE	Delaware
Vito Tisdale	S	Eastern Kentucky
Cormani McClain	CB	Florida
Eric Brantley Jr.	EDGE	Florida Atlantic
Kasen Weisman	QB	Florida Atlantic
Omarion Cooper	CB	Florida State
Bishop Thomas	DL	Georgia State
Sy'Veon Wilkerson	RB	Georgia State
Israel Solomon	CB	Hawaii
Owen Westemeyer	IOL	Iowa State
Tar'Varish Dawson	WR	Jacksonville State
Khairi Manns	OLB	JMU
Dylan Edwards	RB	Kansas State
Gavin Kuld	QB	Mars Hill
Devee Harris	OLB	Marshall
J.J. Hawkins	DL	Marshall
Willie Gaines	WR	Murray State
Chazz Wallace	DL	NC State
Jack Bailey	OT	Northwestern
Gerad Christian-Lichtenhan	IOL	Oregon State
Anthony Hankerson	RB	Oregon State
Van Wells	IOL	Oregon State
Kyndrich Breedlove	CB	Purdue
Michael Harrison	TE	San Diego State
Trent Carrizosa	P	San Jose State
Jaden Milliner-Jones	S	SMU
Jack Wilty	G	South Florida
Kendal Stewart	WR	Sussex County CC
Savion Washington	OT	Syracuse
David Conner	OT	Texas State
Chernet Estes	WR	Utah Tech
Kofi Taylor-Barrocks	LB	UTEP
Cameron Warchuck	LS	Washington
Zach Blackwood	DL	TBD
Dante Capolungo	WR	TBD
Andi Etok	CB	TBD
Demouy Kennedy	LB	TBD
Eoghan Kerry	LB	TBD
Jacob Page	WR	TBD
Jacob Politte	LS	TBD
Myles Slusher	S	TBD

==== Incoming ====
Player	Position	Previous school
Anquin Barnes Jr.	DT	Alabama
Kameron Hawkins	LS	Arizona
B. J. Green	DL	Arizona State
Isaiah Augustave	RB	Arkansas
Taurean Carter	DT	Arkansas
RJ Johnson	CB	Arkansas
Colton Hood	CB	Auburn
Dominiq Ponder	QB	Bethune–Cookman
Nikhai Hill-Green	LB	Charlotte
Chamon Metayer	TE	Cincinnati
Zechariah Owens	OT	Clemson
Phillip Houston	OL	FIU
Johnny Chaney	LB	Florida A&M
Kardell Thomas	IOL	Florida A&M
Jaylen Wester	LB	Florida Atlantic
LaJohntay Wester	WR	Florida Atlantic
Ivan Yates	DB	Furman
Tyler Johnson	IOL	Houston
Chidozie Nwankwo	DL	Houston
Herman Smith	S	Idaho State
Kahlil Benson	OT	Indiana
Amari Ward	OT	Jackson State
Destin Wade	QB	Kentucky
Keaten Wade	EDGE	Kentucky
Preston Hodge	DB	Liberty
Tawfiq Thomas	DL	Louisville
Quency Wiggins	DE	LSU
Savion Riley	S	Miami (FL)
Rashad Amos	RB	Miami (OH)
Ethan Boyd	OT	Michigan State
Terrell Timmons Jr.	WR	NC State
Nikhil Webb Walker	LB	New Mexico State
Rayyan Buell	DT	Ohio
Sam Hart	TE	Ohio State
Dallan Hayden	RB	Ohio State
D. J. McKinney	CB	Oklahoma State
Dayon Hayes	DL	Pittsburgh
Samuel Okunlola	DE	Pittsburgh
Cordale Russell	WR	TCU
Payton Kirkland	OL	Texas
Yakiri Walker	IOL	UConn
Charlie Williams	TE	UNLV
Justin Mayers	IOL	UTEP
Will Sheppard	WR	Vanderbilt
Walter Taylor	QB	Vanderbilt
Wyatt Hummel	OT	Villanova
