= Treyson Bourguet =

American football player (born 2003)

No. 10 – BYU Cougars
- Position: Quarterback
- Class: Redshirt Senior

Personal information
- Born: December 16, 2003 (age 22); Tucson, Arizona, U.S.
- Listed height: 6 ft 2 in (1.88 m)
- Listed weight: 205 lb (93 kg)

Career information
- High school: Salpointe Catholic (Tucson)
- College: Western Michigan (2022–2023); BYU (2024–present)
- Stats at ESPN

Treyson Bourguet (born December 16, 2003) is an American college football quarterback for the BYU Cougars. He previously played for the Western Michigan Broncos.

== Early life ==
Bourguet was born in Tucson, Arizona and attended high school at Salpointe Catholic. In his high school football career, Bourguet completed 282 of his 464 pass attempts for 3,987 yards and 57 touchdowns, to 13 interceptions. Bourguet would also rush for 683 yards and 11 touchdowns, while also hauling in one reception for 17 yards. Bourguet originally committed to Arizona but instead committed to play college football at Western Michigan University.

== College career ==
=== Western Michigan ===
During Bourguet's true freshman season in 2022, he played in four games where he completed 54 out of 109 passing attempts for 601 yards, two touchdowns and an interception. He made his first career start against Miami (OH) where he rushed for 25 yards and threw for 123 yards. During a game against Bowling Green, he threw a career high 191 yards on 16 completions along with his first collegiate touchdown pass.

During the Week 5 game against Ball State in the 2023 season, he completed 21 out of 27 passing attempts for 328 yards and three touchdowns, leading the team to win 42-24. Because of his performance, he was named the MAC West Offensive Player of the Week. He entered the transfer portal on December 4, 2023.

=== BYU ===
On January 6, 2024, Bourguet announced that he would transfer to BYU.

=== College statistics ===
Year	Team	Games			Passing								Rushing			
Year	Team	GP	GS	Record	Cmp	Att	Pct	Yds	Avg	TD	Int	Rtg	Att	Yds	Avg	TD
2022	Western Michigan	4	4	2–2	54	109	49.5	601	5.5	2	1	100.1	43	154	3.6	1
2023	Western Michigan	6	4	1–3	57	103	55.3	713	6.9	4	1	124.4	36	65	1.8	0
2024	BYU	0	0	0–0	0	0	0.0	0	0	0	0	0.0	0	0	0	0
Career		10	8	3−5	111	212	52.4	1,314	6.2	6	2	111.9	79	219	1.8	1

== Personal life ==
Bourguet is the brother of Arizona State quarterback Trenton Bourguet.
