= Tanner Wall =

American football player (born 1999)

Profile
- Position: Safety

Personal information
- Born: November 12, 1999 (age 26); Arlington, Virginia, U.S.
- Listed height: 6 ft 1 in (1.85 m)
- Listed weight: 196 lb (89 kg)

Career information
- High school: Yorktown (Arlington County, Virginia)
- College: BYU (2021–2025)
- NFL draft: 2026: undrafted

Career history
- Las Vegas Raiders (2026)*; Miami Dolphins (2026)*; New York Jets (2026)*
- * Offseason or practice squad member only

Awards and highlights
- First-team All-Big 12 (2025)
- Stats at ESPN

Tanner Wall (born November 12, 1999) is an American professional football safety. He played college football for the BYU Cougars.

== Early life ==
Wall attended Yorktown High School, located in Arlington County, Virginia. As a freshman at Yorktown, Wall was 5'3" and 99 pounds. Wall played quarterback, receiver, and defensive back at Yorktown and was the Arlington Sun-Gazette's offensive and defensive player of year. After graduating from high school, Wall served a full-time mission for the Church of Jesus Christ of Latter-day Saints in Maceio, Brazil from 2018 to 2020. Following his missionary service, he committed to play college football for the BYU Cougars, joining the team as a walk-on.

== College career ==
During his first two college seasons, 2021 and 2022, Wall was listed on the roster as a wide receiver, though he almost exclusively played on special teams and recorded no receptions. Prior to the 2023 season, Wall switched from wide receiver to safety. During his first season at safety in 2023, he appeared in five games with three starts, notching 22 tackles. Wall was named a full-time starter at safety for the 2024 season. He started all 13 games in 2024, totaling 53 tackles and three interceptions. Prior to the 2025 season, Wall was named a team captain. He recorded ten tackles and an interception in a week 10 victory versus rival Utah, a performance which earned him Big 12 Defensive Player of the Week honors. At the conclusion of the 2025 season, he was named to the All-Big 12 First Team.

== Professional career ==
Pre-draft measurables
Height	Weight	Arm length	Hand span	Wingspan	40-yard dash	10-yard split	20-yard split	20-yard shuttle	Three-cone drill	Vertical jump	Broad jump	Bench press
6 ft 0 7/8 in (1.85 m)	196 lb (89 kg)	31 7/8 in (0.81 m)	9 5/8 in (0.24 m)	6 ft 4 1/8 in (1.93 m)	4.61 s	1.60 s	2.62 s	4.19 s	6.80 s	37.5 in (0.95 m)	10 ft 9 in (3.28 m)	14 reps
All values from Pro Day

=== Las Vegas Raiders ===
Wall signed with the Las Vegas Raiders as an undrafted free agent on April 30, 2026. He was waived by the Raiders on August 5.

=== Miami Dolphins ===
On August 7, 2026, Wall signed with the Miami Dolphins. He was waived by the Dolphins on August 17.

=== New York Jets ===
On August 23, 2026, Wall signed with the New York Jets. He was waived by the Jets as a part of final roster cuts on August 30.
