= Kevin M. Gilbride =

American football coach (born 1979)

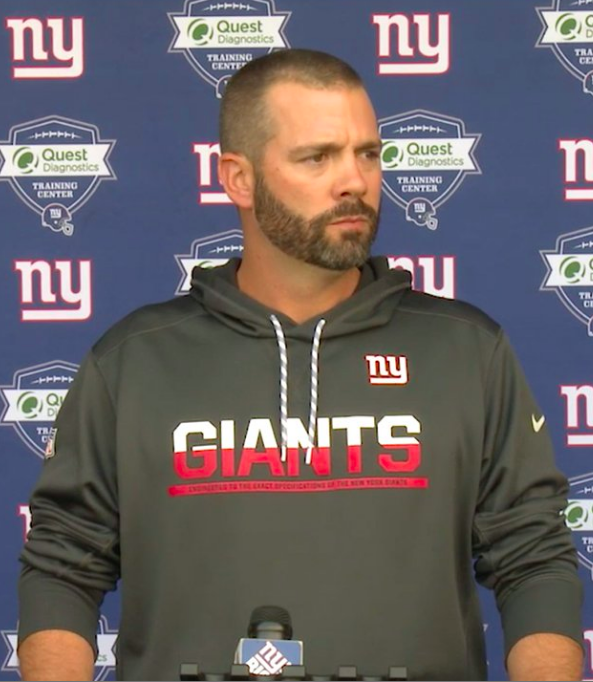
- Gilbride in 2018

BYU Cougars
- Title: Tight ends coach

Personal information
- Born: December 14, 1979 (age 46); Springfield, Massachusetts, U.S.

Career information
- High school: Bishop Kenny (Jacksonville, Florida)
- College: Hawaiʻi

Career history
- Syracuse (2003–2005) Offensive graduate assistant; Georgetown (2006) Slot receiver/tight ends coach; Temple (2007–2009) Wide receivers coach; New York Giants (2010–2017); Offensive quality control assistant (2010–2011); Wide receivers coach (2012–2013); Tight ends coach (2014–2017); Chicago Bears (2018–2019) Tight ends coach; Carolina Panthers (2021–2022); Defensive analyst (2021); Tight ends coach (2022); Charlotte (2023) Offensive analyst; BYU (2024–present) Tight ends coach

Awards and highlights
- Super Bowl champion (XLVI)

Kevin Michael Gilbride (born December 14, 1979) is an American football coach who is currently the tight ends coach at Brigham Young University (BYU). Prior to joining BYU's coaching staff, Gilbride served as a tight ends coach in the National Football League (NFL) for the Carolina Panthers, the Chicago Bears, and the New York Giants, where he earned a Super Bowl ring as a coach in Super Bowl XLVI.

== Early life ==
Born in Springfield, Massachusetts, Kevin M. Gilbride is the son of former New York Giants offensive coordinator Kevin Bernard Gilbride. Kevin M. graduated from Bishop Kenny High School in Jacksonville, Florida in 1998. He played football, baseball, and basketball in high school.

Gilbride enrolled in Brigham Young University in 1998 and redshirted his freshman year. He played in BYU's spring 1999 game but transferred to the University of Hawaii shortly after. As a sophomore at Hawaii in 2000, Gilbride was a backup quarterback who played on special teams. Gilbride also played on the Hawaii Rainbow Warriors baseball team from 2000 to 2002 as an outfielder. Gilbride graduated from Hawaii in 2003 with a degree in communications.

== Coaching career ==
In 2003, Gilbride enrolled at Syracuse University and worked as a video graduate assistant in 2003 then an offensive graduate assistant with the Syracuse Orange football team for the 2004 and 2005 seasons. In 2006, Gilbride was slot receiver and tight end coach at Georgetown. From 2007 to 2009, Gilbride was wide receivers coach at Temple.

=== New York Giants (2010–2017) ===
Kevin began his career as the Giants offensive quality control coach in 2010. He won a Super Bowl ring with the Giants when they defeated the New England Patriots in Super Bowl XLVI by a score of 21–17.

In 2012, he was promoted to wide receivers coach. Under Gilbride's guidance, receiver Victor Cruz was selected to the Pro Bowl in 2012.

In 2014, he was reassigned to tight ends coach. In 2017, Gilbride was entrusted with the development of first round pick Evan Engram. Engram flourished in his first season with the Giants and led all NFL Rookie Tight Ends in nearly every major statistic including receptions, yards and touchdowns while showing improvement in blocking.

=== Chicago Bears (2018–2019) ===
On January 13, 2018, the Chicago Bears announced that Gilbride would join Matt Nagy's staff as tight ends coach. In Gilbride's first season, the Bears won the NFC North for the first time since 2010.

=== Carolina Panthers (2021–2022) ===
Gilbride was hired by the Panthers as a defensive analyst in 2021. He was promoted to tight ends coach in February 2022.

=== Brigham Young University Cougars (2024–present) ===
On January 12, 2024 it was announced that Gilbride would join Kalani Sitake's staff as tight ends coach. Gilbride replaced Steve Clark who had coached the tight ends group at BYU from 2016 to 2023.
