= Robert Livingston (American football) =

American football coach (born 1985)

Denver Broncos
- Title: Defensive pass game coordinator

Personal information
- Born: November 29, 1985 (age 40); Hendersonville, North Carolina, U.S.
- Listed height: 6 ft 2 in (1.88 m)
- Listed weight: 205 lb (93 kg)

Career information
- Position: Safety
- College: William & Mary (2007–2009)

Career history

Coaching
- Furman (2010) Safeties coach; Vanderbilt (2011) Defensive quality control coach; Cincinnati Bengals (2015–2023); Defensive quality control coach (2015); Secondary/safeties coach (2016–2023); Colorado (2024–2025) Defensive coordinator; Denver Broncos (2026–present) Defensive pass game coordinator

Operations
- Cincinnati Bengals (2012–2014) Scout

Robert Livingston (born November 29, 1985) is an American professional football coach who is the defensive pass game coordinator for the Denver Broncos of the National Football League (NFL). He was previously a football coach in the NFL from 2012 to 2023, as the safeties coach/secondary coach of the Cincinnati Bengals. He has also served as the defensive coordinator for the Colorado Buffaloes. At the college level, he played safety for William & Mary from 2007 to 2009.

Pre-draft measurables
Height	Weight	40-yard dash	10-yard split	20-yard split	20-yard shuttle	Three-cone drill	Vertical jump	Broad jump	Bench press
6 ft 1 5/8 in (1.87 m)	205 lb (93 kg)	4.80 s	1.65 s	2.76 s	4.27 s	7.18 s	30.0 in (0.76 m)	9 ft 5 in (2.87 m)	11 reps
All values from Pro Day

== Coaching career ==
=== Furman ===
In 2010, Livingston got his first coaching job with Furman as the team's safeties coach.

=== Vanderbilt ===
In 2011, Livingston joined Vanderbilt as a defensive quality control coach.

=== Cincinnati Bengals ===
Livingston got his first career NFL job as a scout for the Cincinnati Bengals. In 2015, Livingston was promoted by the Bengals to be a defensive quality control/special teams assistant. Then in 2016, he was promoted again this time to be the secondary coach.

In 2021, the Bengals finished with a 10–7 record and clinched their first AFC North title since 2015. It also marked their first Super Bowl appearance since 1988. Livingston on the defensive side, Bengals rushing defense ranked 5th best amongst all NFL teams.

=== Colorado ===
In 2024, Livingston was hired by the Colorado Buffaloes to be the team's defensive coordinator.

=== Denver Broncos ===
On February 25, 2026, it was announced that the Denver Broncos were hiring Livingston as their defensive pass game coordinator, replacing Jim Leonhard.
