= Isaiah Glasker =

American football player (born 2002)

No. 16 – BYU Cougars
- Position: Linebacker
- Class: Redshirt Junior

Personal information
- Born: October 8, 2002 (age 24)
- Listed height: 6 ft 5 in (1.96 m)
- Listed weight: 240 lb (109 kg)

Career information
- High school: Bingham (South Jordan, Utah)
- College: BYU (2022–present)

Awards and highlights
- Third-team All-Big 12 (2025)
- Stats at ESPN

Isaiah Glasker (born October 8, 2002) is an American college football linebacker for the BYU Cougars.

== Early life ==
Glasker attended Bingham High School in South Jordan, Utah. He played both wide receiver and safety in high school.

== College career ==
Glasker joined Brigham Young University (BYU) as a walk-on in 2023. He played in eight games and had three tackles that year. As a redshirt sophomore in 2024, Glasker had 70 tackles, 3.5 sacks, and three interceptions, one which he returned for a touchdown. He was named the MVP of the 2024 Alamo Bowl after recording eight tackles and an interception. Glasker returned to BYU for his junior year in 2025.
