= Micah Welch =

American football player

No. 29 – Colorado Buffaloes
- Position: Running back
- Class: Junior

Personal information
- Born: Macon, Georgia, U.S.
- Listed height: 5 ft 9 in (1.75 m)
- Listed weight: 215 lb (98 kg)

Career information
- High school: Baldwin (Milledgeville, Georgia)
- College: Colorado (2024–present)
- Stats at ESPN

Micah Welch is an American college football running back for the Colorado Buffaloes.

== Early life ==
Welch attended Baldwin High School in Milledgeville, Georgia. He finished his high school career with over 4,000 all-purpose yards and 47 touchdowns. Coming out of high school, Welch was rated as a three-star recruit and the 40th overall running back in the class of 2024, committing to play college football for the Colorado Buffaloes over offers from other schools such as Florida, Georgia Tech, Kentucky, Mississippi, North Carolina State, Oregon, Tennessee, and West Virginia.

== College career ==
In week 3 of the 2024 season, Welch rushed for 65 yards on nine carries in a win over rival Colorado State. In week 4, he rushed for 22 yards and two touchdowns in a victory versus Baylor Bears. Welch finished the year with 186 rushing yards and four touchdowns on 43 carries. Heading into the 2025 season, Welch competed for the starting running back job alongside Dallan Hayden, as he was named to the Doak Walker Award watchlist.

=== Statistics ===
College statistics
Season	Team	Games	Rushing				Receiving			
Season	Team	GP	Att	Yards	Avg	TD	Rec	Yards	Avg	TD
2024	Colorado	7	43	186	4.3	4	8	54	6.8	0
2025	Colorado	12	96	384	4.0	4	11	37	3.4	0
2026	Colorado	2	26	164	6.3	2	1	13	13.0	0
Career		21	165	734	4.4	10	20	104	5.2	0
