= LJ Martin =

American football player

No. 4 – BYU Cougars
- Position: Running back
- Class: Senior

Personal information
- Listed height: 6 ft 2 in (1.88 m)
- Listed weight: 225 lb (102 kg)

Career information
- High school: Canutillo (Canutillo, Texas)
- College: BYU (2023–present)

Awards and highlights
- Big 12 Offensive Player of the Year (2025); First-team All-Big 12 (2025)
- Stats at ESPN

LJ Martin is an American college football running back for the BYU Cougars.

== Early life ==
Martin attended Canutillo High School in Canutillo, Texas, where he rushed for 2,137 yards and 23 touchdowns and made 15 catches for 376 yards and six touchdowns as a senior. He was rated as a four-star recruit and received offers from schools such as BYU, Stanford, Texas Tech, Air Force, Baylor, Kansas, Kansas State, and Colorado State. Initially, Martin committed to play college football for the Texas Tech Red Raiders. However, he flipped his commitment to play for the Stanford Cardinal. Finally on signing day, Martin again flipped his commitment to the BYU Cougars.

== College career ==
During Martin's first collegiate game in week one of the 2023 season he rushed for 91 yards on 16 carries, as he helped the Cougars to a win over the Sam Houston State. In week 3, Martin rushed for 77 yards and two touchdowns in a win over the Arkansas Razorbacks. Martin finished his first collegiate season rushing for 518 yards and four touchdowns on 109 carries, while also hauling in 11 receptions for 45 yards and one touchdown.
