= Stuart Forbes =

Stuart Forbes may refer to:

- Stuart Forbes (American football)
- Stuart Forbes (rower)
