= 2025 Arizona Wildcats football team =

American college football season

2025 Arizona Wildcats football

Holiday Bowl, L 19–24 vs. SMU
- Conference: Big 12 Conference
- Record: 9–4 (6–3 Big 12)
- Head coach: Brent Brennan (2nd season)
- Offensive coordinator: Seth Doege (1st season)
- Offensive scheme: Spread
- Defensive coordinator: Danny Gonzales (1st season)
- Base defense: 3–3–5
- Home stadium: Arizona Stadium (renamed Casino del Sol Stadium before final game)

Uniform

2025 Big 12 Conference football standings
	Conf.			Overall
Team	W		L	W		L
No. 7 Texas Tech y$^	8	–	1	12	–	2
No. 11 BYU y	8	–	1	12	–	2
No. 14 Utah	7	–	2	11	–	2
No. 22 Houston	6	–	3	10	–	3
Arizona	6	–	3	9	–	4
Arizona State	6	–	3	8	–	5
No. 25 TCU	5	–	4	9	–	4
Iowa State	5	–	4	8	–	4
Cincinnati	5	–	4	7	–	6
Kansas State	5	–	4	6	–	6
Baylor	3	–	6	5	–	7
Kansas	3	–	6	5	–	7
UCF	2	–	7	5	–	7
West Virginia	2	–	7	4	–	8
Colorado	1	–	8	3	–	9
Oklahoma State	0	–	9	1	–	11
Championship: Texas Tech 34, BYU 7
^ – College Football Playoff participant; $ – Conference champion; y – Championship game participant; Rankings from AP Poll

The 2025 Arizona Wildcats football team represented the University of Arizona in the Big 12 Conference during the 2025 NCAA Division I FBS football season. Arizona was led by second-year head coach Brent Brennan. They played their first six home games at Arizona Stadium, located in Tucson, Arizona. On November 11, 2025, The University of Arizona announced a 20-year naming rights deal with the Pascua Yaqui Tribe, with the venue now being called Casino Del Sol Stadium for the final home game. This was the Wildcats' 126th season overall, and their second year in the Big 12.

The Arizona Wildcats drew an average home attendance of 41,782.

== Offseason ==
Positions key
Offense	Defense	Special teams
QB — Quarterback; RB — Running back; FB — Fullback; WR — Wide receiver; TE — Tight end; OL — Offensive lineman; T — Tackle; G — Guard; C — Center	DL — Defensive lineman; DT — Defensive tackle (Note: Includes nose tackle (NT)); DE — Defensive end; EDGE — Edge rusher; LB — Linebacker (Note: Includes middle linebacker (MLB/MIKE), weakside linebacker (WILL), strongside linebacker (SAM), off-ball linebacker, and outside linebacker (OLB)); DB — Defensive back; CB — Cornerback; S — Safety (Note: Includes free safety (FS) and strong safety (SS))	K — Kicker (Note: Also known as a placekicker (PK)); P — Punter; LS — Long snapper; RS — Return specialist (Note: Includes kickoff and punt returners)

=== Departures ===
==== Team departures ====
Over the course of the off-season, Arizona lost 14 total players. 9 players graduated, 5 declared for the 2025 NFL draft.

2025 Arizona Offseason departures
Name	Pos.	Height	Weight	Year	Hometown	Notes
Quali Conley	RB	5′10	207	Senior	Fresno, CA	Graduated/Declared by 2025 NFL Draft
Justin Holloway	LS	6'3	206	Senior	Venice, FL	Graduated
Jacory Croskey-Merritt	RB	5′11	205	Senior	Montgomery, AL	Graduated/Declared by 2025 NFL Draft
Stanley Ta’ufo’ou	DL	6′2	275	Redshirt Senior	Simi Valley, CA	Graduated
Owen Goss	DB	6′0	205	Senior	Hinsdale, IL	Graduated/Declared by 2025 NFL Draft
Jared Small	LB	6'2	220	Senior	Baton Rouge, LA	Graduated
Joey Capra	OL	6'4	301	Redshirt Senior	Auburn, CA	Graduated
Montana Lemonious-Craig	WR	6′2	190	Senior	Inglewood, CA	Graduated
Josh Baker	OL	6′3	280	Senior	Eureka, MO	Graduated
Kevon Darton	DL	5′11	271	Senior	Fitchburg, MA	Graduated
Lance Keneley	LB	6′4	250	Senior	Mission Viejo, CA	Graduated
Tyler Loop	PK	6′1	190	Senior	Lucas, TX	Graduated
Tetairoa McMillan	WR	6′5	212	Junior	Waimānalo, HI	Declared by 2025 NFL Draft
Jonah Savaiinaea	OL	6′5	336	Junior	Tafuna, AS	Declared by 2025 NFL Draft

==== Outgoing transfers ====
Forty-two Arizona players elected to enter the NCAA Transfer Portal during or after the 2024 season.

Outgoing

Name	Pos.	Height	Weight	Hometown	New school
Jacob Manu	LB	5'11"	230 lbs	Kahuku, HI	Washington
Brayden Dorman	QB	6'5"	215 lbs	Colorado Springs, CO	CSU Pueblo
Brandon Johnson	RB	5'11"	210 lbs	Highland, CA	Northern Colorado (FCS)
Jackson Holman	WR	6'1"	200 lbs	Irvine, CA	Wyoming
Tacario Davis	DB	6'2"	190 lbs	Long Beach, CA	Washington
Gunner Maldonado	CB	6'0"	180 lbs	Chandler, AZ	Kansas State
Reymello Murphy	WR	6'0	185 lbs	Fremont, CA	UConn
Jonah Rodriguez	OL	6'4	275 lbs	San Diego, CA	Southwestern College (JC)
Demetrius Freeney	CB	6′0	190 lbs	San Leandro, CA	Boise State
Rayshon Luke	RB	5′9	165 lbs	Bellflower, CA	Fresno State
Wendell Moe	OL	6′3	330 lbs	Long Beach, CA	Tennessee
Taitai Uiagelelei	DL	6'3"	255 lbs	Santa Ana, CA	Washington
Malachi Riley	WR	6'1"	165 lbs	Corona, CA	San Jose State
AJ Jones	WR	6'4"	195 lbs	Ontario, CA	Middle Tennessee
Jai-Ayviauynn Celestine	CB	5'10"	175 lbs	Miami, FL	FIU
J.T. Hand	OL	6'3"	285 lbs	Mission Viejo, CA	Oregon State
Bryce Echols	DL	6'5"	275 lbs	Las Vegas, NV	Nevada
Elijha Payne	OL	6'6"	286lbs	Las Vegas, NV	Delaware State (FCS)
Emmanuel Karnley	CB	6'2"	180 lbs	Pittsburg, CA	Virginia
Anthony Garcia	QB	6'2"	193 lbs	Sacramento, CA	Utah State
Nicholas Fernandez	DL	6'4"	255 lbs	San Pedro, CA	UT Rio Grande Valley (FCS)
Cyrus Durham	EDGE	6′4	235 lbs	Redwood, CA	Akron
Nolan Clement	CB	6'3"	220 lbs	Scottsdale, AZ	TBA
Keanu Mailoto	DL	6'4"	275 lbs	Auburn, WA	Boise State
Kamuela Kaaihue	LB	6'2"	210 lbs	Honolulu, HI	UNLV
Tristan Davis	DE	6'6"	235 lbs	Lake Oswego, OR	New Mexico Military Institute (JC)
Dorian Thomas	TE	6'6"	215 lbs	Kent, WA	New Mexico
Adam Damante	QB	6'2"	180 lbs	Gilbert, AZ	Tennessee State (FCS)
Leif Magnuson	OL	6'5"	300 lbs	Saskatoon, CAN	Cal Poly (FCS)
Cole Tannenbaum	QB	6'4"	201 lbs	Los Angeles, CA	TBA
Sam Graci-Glazer	WR	6'2"	165 lbs	Tampa, FL	TBA
Trey Naughton	LS	6'0"	277 lbs	Tucson, AZ	TBA
Dylan Tapley	TE	6'4"	212 lbs	Scottsdale, AZ	San Diego
Justin Flowe	LB	6'2"	225 lbs	Upland, CA	UNLV
Sterling Lane II	LB	6'3"	234 lbs	St. Louis, MO	Boise State
Elijah Brown	CB	6'1"	185 lbs	Los Angeles, CA	Colorado State
Isaiah Johnson	DL	6'1"	311 lbs	Camden, NJ	North Carolina
Tylen Gonzalez	OL	6'6"	324 lbs	Carlsbad, NM	TBA
Lachlan Bruce	LS	6'2"	220 lbs	Geelong, Victoria, Australia	TBA
Cash Peterman	P	6'0"	210 lbs	Chandler, AZ	UCLA

==== Coaching staff departures ====
Name	Position	New Team	New Position	Source
Dino Babers	Offensive coordinator/Quarterbacks coach	Not Retained - TBD	TBD	
Matt Adkins	Tight end coach/Passing game coordinator	Not Retained - TBD	TBD	

=== Entered NFL draft ===
The deadline for players to declare for the NFL draft was January 15, 2025.

Four Arizona players were drafted in 2025.

During the first round of the draft that April, wide receiver Tetairoa McMillan was the Carolina Panthers's 8th pick. In the second round, guard Jonah Savaiinaea (#37) was picked by the Miami Dolphins; in the sixth round, kicker Tyler Loop (#186) was chosen by the Baltimore Ravens and the seventh round, running back Jacory Croskey-Merritt (#245) was selected by the Washington Commanders.

Player	Position	Round	Pick	Drafted by
Tetairoa McMillan	WR	1	8	Carolina Panthers
Jonah Savaiinaea	OG	2	37	Miami Dolphins
Tyler Loop	K	6	186	Baltimore Ravens
Jacory Croskey-Merritt	RB	7	245	Washington Commanders
Quali Conley	RB	Undrafted	UFA	Cincinnati Bengals

=== Total picks by school ===
Team	Round 1	Round 2	Round 3	Round 4	Round 5	Round 6	Round 7	Total
Arizona	1	1	0	0	0	1	1	4

=== Recruiting class ===
The following recruits and transfers have signed letters of intent or verbally committed to the Arizona Wildcats football program for the 2025 recruiting year.

College recruiting
Name	Hometown	School	Height	Weight	Commit date
Isaiah Mizell; Wide receiver	Orlando, FL	Boone High School	6 ft 0 in (1.83 m)	165 lb (75 kg)	Jul 10, 2024
Isaiah Mizell; Wide receiver	Recruit ratings: Rivals: 247Sports: ESPN: (78)				
Swayde Griffin; Cornerback	Lago, TX	Lago Vista High School	6 ft 1 in (1.85 m)	175 lb (79 kg)	Jun 23, 2024
Swayde Griffin; Cornerback	Recruit ratings: Rivals: 247Sports: ESPN: (78)				
Sione Tohi; Offensive guard	Santa Clara, CA	Mater Dei High School	6 ft 2 in (1.88 m)	310 lb (140 kg)	Jun 23, 2024
Sione Tohi; Offensive guard	Recruit ratings: Rivals: 247Sports: ESPN: (77)				
Dajon Hamilton; Cornerback	Chandler, AZ	Hamilton High School	5 ft 10 in (1.78 m)	180 lb (82 kg)	Jun 23, 2024
Dajon Hamilton; Cornerback	Recruit ratings: Rivals: 247Sports: ESPN: (77)				
Losipini Tupou; Offensive guard	San Francisco, CA	Archbishop Riordan High School	6 ft 2 in (1.88 m)	280 lb (130 kg)	Jun 24, 2024
Losipini Tupou; Offensive guard	Recruit ratings: Rivals: 247Sports: ESPN: (77)				
Sawyer Anderson; Quarterback	Dallas, TX	Parish Episcopal School	5 ft 10 in (1.78 m)	180 lb (82 kg)	Dec 16, 2024
Sawyer Anderson; Quarterback	Recruit ratings: Rivals: 247Sports: ESPN: (77)				
Gio Richardson; Wide receiver	Chandler, AZ	Basha High School	5 ft 10 in (1.78 m)	170 lb (77 kg)	Aug 30, 2024
Gio Richardson; Wide receiver	Recruit ratings: Rivals: 247Sports: ESPN: (77)				
Coleman Patmon; Safety	Del Valle, TX	Del Valle High School	6 ft 2 in (1.88 m)	190 lb (86 kg)	Jun 26, 2024
Coleman Patmon; Safety	Recruit ratings: Rivals: 247Sports: ESPN: (77)				
Peter Langi; Offensive guard	San Francisco, CA	Archbishop Riordan High School	6 ft 5 in (1.96 m)	325 lb (147 kg)	Nov 24, 2024
Peter Langi; Offensive guard	Recruit ratings: Rivals: 247Sports: ESPN: (76)				
Kason Brown; Safety	Big Lake, TX	Reagan County High School	6 ft 3 in (1.91 m)	190 lb (86 kg)	Dec 3, 2024
Kason Brown; Safety	Recruit ratings: Rivals: 247Sports: ESPN: (76)				
Gianna Edwards; Cornerback	Forney, TX	North Forney High School	5 ft 11 in (1.80 m)	170 lb (77 kg)	Jun 24, 2024
Gianna Edwards; Cornerback	Recruit ratings: Rivals: 247Sports: ESPN: (76)				
Kellan Ford; Tight end	Spring Valley, CA	Monte Vista High School	6 ft 4 in (1.93 m)	295 lb (134 kg)	Apr 7, 2024
Kellan Ford; Tight end	Recruit ratings: Rivals: 247Sports: ESPN: (76)				
Elijah Brown; Cornerback	Harbor City, CA	El Camino College (JC)	6 ft 1 in (1.85 m)	185 lb (84 kg)	Jan 7, 2025
Elijah Brown; Cornerback	Recruit ratings: Rivals: 247Sports: ESPN: (76)				
Myron Robinson; Inside linebacker	San Antonio, TX	East Central High School	6 ft 1 in (1.85 m)	210 lb (95 kg)	Nov 16, 2024
Myron Robinson; Inside linebacker	Recruit ratings: Rivals: 247Sports: ESPN: (76)				
Luke Haugo; Quarterback	Phoenix, AZ	North High School	5 ft 11 in (1.80 m)	175 lb (79 kg)	Jun 4, 2024
Luke Haugo; Quarterback	Recruit ratings: Rivals: 247Sports: ESPN: (76)				
Kaleb Jones; Defensive tackle	Phoenix, AZ	Mountain Pointe High School	6 ft 1 in (1.85 m)	280 lb (130 kg)	Jun 24, 2024
Kaleb Jones; Defensive tackle	Recruit ratings: Rivals: 247Sports: ESPN: (75)				
Wesley Yarbrough; Running back	Crosby, TX	Crosby High School	5 ft 10 in (1.78 m)	200 lb (91 kg)	Jun 17, 2024
Wesley Yarbrough; Running back	Recruit ratings: Rivals: 247Sports: ESPN: (75)				
Mays Pese; Defensive tackle	Santa Barbara, CA	Bishop Garcia Diego High School	6 ft 2 in (1.88 m)	275 lb (125 kg)	Jun 26, 2024
Mays Pese; Defensive tackle	Recruit ratings: Rivals: 247Sports: ESPN: (75)				
Javian Goo; Offensive guard	Kapolei, HI	Kapolei High School	6 ft 3 in (1.91 m)	280 lb (130 kg)	Aug 23, 2024
Javian Goo; Offensive guard	Recruit ratings: Rivals: 247Sports: ESPN: (75)				
Ezra Funa; Defensive tackle	Santa Ana, CA	College of San Mateo (JC)	6 ft 3 in (1.91 m)	295 lb (134 kg)	Jan 29, 2025
Ezra Funa; Defensive tackle	Recruit ratings: Rivals: 247Sports: ESPN: (74)				
Louis Akpa; Offensive tackle	San Mateo, CA	Junipero Serra High School	6 ft 5 in (1.96 m)	250 lb (110 kg)	Oct 30, 2024
Louis Akpa; Offensive tackle	Recruit ratings: Rivals: 247Sports: ESPN: (74)				
Zac Siulepa; Offensive guard	Gold Coast, AU	Garden City Community College (JC)	6 ft 6 in (1.98 m)	375 lb (170 kg)	Dec 4, 2024
Zac Siulepa; Offensive guard	Recruit ratings: Rivals: 247Sports: ESPN: (74)				
Jaxon Griffin; Offensive tackle	Mesa, AZ	Red Mountain High School	6 ft 5 in (1.96 m)	250 lb (110 kg)	Dec 2, 2024
Jaxon Griffin; Offensive tackle	Recruit ratings: Rivals: 247Sports: ESPN: (72)				
Porter Patton; Defensive end	Austin, TX	Westlake High School	6 ft 4 in (1.93 m)	340 lb (150 kg)	Dec 10, 2024
Porter Patton; Defensive end	Recruit ratings: Rivals: 247Sports: ESPN: (72)				
Siale Uluave; Offensive guard	Mission Hills, CA	College of San Mateo (JC)	6 ft 4 in (1.93 m)	350 lb (160 kg)	Jan 30, 2025
Siale Uluave; Offensive guard	Recruit ratings: Rivals: 247Sports: ESPN: (70)				
Carter Jones; Inside linebacker	Irvine, CA	Crean Lutheran High School	6 ft 0 in (1.83 m)	210 lb (95 kg)	Oct 25, 2024
Carter Jones; Inside linebacker	Recruit ratings: Rivals: 247Sports: ESPN: (69)				
Leroy Palu; Defensive tackle	Norwalk, CA	Cerritos College (JC)	6 ft 2 in (1.88 m)	290 lb (130 kg)	Jan 9, 2025
Leroy Palu; Defensive tackle	Recruit ratings: Rivals: 247Sports: ESPN: (69)				
Broden Molen; Long snapper	Great Falls, MT	Great Falls High School	6 ft 0 in (1.83 m)	215 lb (98 kg)	Apr 29, 2025
Broden Molen; Long snapper	Recruit ratings: 247Sports:				
Overall recruit ranking:
‡ Refers to 40-yard dash; Note: In many cases, Scout, Rivals, 247Sports, On3, and ESPN may conflict in their listings of height, weight and 40 time.; In these cases, the average was taken. ESPN grades are on a 100-point scale.; Sources: "Arizona Football Commitment List". Rivals.; "2025 Player Commitments – Arizona". ESPN.; "2025 Team Ranking". Rivals.com.; "Arizona 2025 Football Commitments". 247Sports.

*= 247Sports Composite rating; ratings are out of 1.00. (five stars= 1.00–.98, four stars= .97–.90, three stars= .80–.89)
†= Despite being rated as a four and five star recruit by ESPN, On3.com, Rivals.com and 247Sports.com, Williams and Whittington received a four star 247Sports Composite rating.
Δ= TBD left the Arizona program following signing but prior to the 2025 season.

2025 overall class rankings

Website	National rank	Conference rank	5 star recruits	4 star recruits	3 star recruits
ESPN	--	--	--	2	17
On3 Recruits	48	10	--	1	27
Rivals	42	4	--	1	21
247 Sports	49	8	--	1	22

=== Acquisitions ===
==== Incoming transfers ====
Over the off-season, Arizona added twenty-nine players from the transfer portal. According to 247 Sports, Arizona had the No. 18 ranked transfer class in the country.

Name	Pos.	Height	Weight	Hometown	Prev. school	Year	Eligibility Remaining
Ka'ena DeCarmbra	OL	6'3"	320 lbs	Honolulu, HI	Hawaii	Junior	1
Tristan Bounds	OL	6'8"	305 lbs	Wallingford, CT	Michigan	Senior	1
Blake Gotcher	LB	6'2"	230 lbs	Little Elm, TX	Northwestern State (FCS)	Junior	1
Ismail Mahdi	RB	5'10"	190 lbs	Plano, TX	Texas State	Junior	1
Deshawn McKnight	DL	6'4"	275 lbs	Sumter, SC	UT Martin (FCS)	Junior	1
Jordan Brown	OL	6'5"	310 lbs	Atlanta, GA	Georgia Tech	RS Junior	1
Ty Buchanan	OL	6'6"	290 lbs	Corpus Christi, TX	Texas Tech	Junior	1
Kris Hutson	WR	5'11"	175 lbs	Compton, CA	Washington State	Senior	1
Jshawn Frausto-Ramos	DB	6'0"	185 lbs	Los Angeles, CA	Stanford	Sophomore	2
Jay'Vion Cole	DB	6'1"	195 lbs	Dallas, TX	Texas	Junior	1
Michael Dansby	DB	6'0"	190 lbs	San Jose, CA	San Jose State	Junior	1
Chancellor Owens	DL	6'3"	280 lbs	Shreveport, LA	Northwestern State (FCS)	Freshman	3
Luke Wysong	WR	5'10"	180 lbs	Albuquerque, NM	New Mexico	Junior	1
Tre Spivey	WR	6'4"	217 lbs	Chandler, AZ	Kansas State	RS Freshman	3
Cameron Barmore	WR	6'6"	230 lbs	Panama, NY	Mercyhurst (FCS)	Graduated Student	1
Riley Wilson	LB	6'2"	230 lbs	Prosper, TX	Montana (FCS)	Junior	1
Braedyn Locke	QB	6'1	195 lbs	Rockwall, TX	Wisconsin	Sophomore	2
Mike Mitchell	RB	6'0	216 lbs	Orange Park, FL	Utah	Freshman	3
Ayden Garnes	CB	6'0"	175 lbs	Philadelphia, PA	West Virginia	RS Junior	1
Javin Whatley	WR	5'10"	167 lbs	Rockmart, GA	Chattanooga (FCS)	RS Junior	1
Quincy Craig	RB	5'10"	195 lbs	Garden Grove, CA	Portland State (FCS)	Sophomore	2
Issac Perez	OL	6'3"	325 lbs	Corona, CA	Portland State (FCS)	Sophomore	2
Max Harris	LB	6'0"	225 lbs	Montgomery, AL	Texas State	Junior	1
Malachi Bailey	DL	6'2"	260 lbs	Atlanta, GA	Alcorn State (FCS)	Junior	1
Tiaoalii Savea	DL	6'4"	295 lbs	Las Vegas, NV	Texas	Senior	1
Ian Wagner	K	6'2"	215 lbs	Sierra Vista, AZ	Illinois State (FCS)	Junior	1
Avery Salerno	LS	6'0"	220 lbs	Clemmons, NC	Jackson State (FCS)	Junior	1
Keona Peat	OL	6'4"	260 lbs	Tucson, AZ	Arizona State	RS Freshman	3

==== Walk-ons ====
Name	Pos.	Height	Weight	Hometown	High school
-	-	-	-	-	-

==== Coaching staff additions ====
Name	New Position	Previous Team	Previous Position	Source
Seth Doege	Offensive coordinator/quarterbacks coach	Marshall	Offensive coordinator/quarterbacks coach	
Joe Salave'a	Associate head coach/defensive line coach	Miami	Associate head coach/run game coordinator/defensive line coach	
Josh Miller	Tight ends coach	Marshall	Tight ends coach	
Craig Naivar	Special Teams coordinator	Coastal Carolina	Defensive coordinator/safeties coach	
Josh Bringuel	Linebackers coach			

== Preseason ==
=== Award watch lists ===
Listed in the order that they were released

Award	Player	Position	Year	Source
Lott Trophy	Taye Brown	LB	Jr.	
Maxwell Award	Noah Fifita	QB	Jr.	
Paul Hornung Award	Ismail Mahdi	RB	Sr.	
Wuerffel Trophy	Genesis Smith	DB	Jr.	
Biletnikoff Award	Luke Wysong	WR	Sr.	
John Mackey Award	Keyan Burnett	TE	Sr.	
Polynesian College Football Player Of The Year Award	Ka'ena Decambra	OL	R-Sr.	
Polynesian College Football Player Of The Year Award	Chubba Ma'ae	OL	R-Sr.	
Polynesian College Football Player Of The Year Award	Rhino Tapa'atoutai	OL	R-So.	
Polynesian College Football Player Of The Year Award	Noah Fifita	QB	Jr.	
Polynesian College Football Player Of The Year Award	Tiaoalii Savea	DL	R-Jr.	
Johnny Unitas Golden Arm Award	Noah Fifita	QB	Jr.	
Comeback Player of the Year Award	Treydan Stukes	CB	R-Sr.	
Earl Campbell Tyler Rose Award	Ty Buchanan	OL	Sr.	

== Schedule ==
Date	Time	Opponent	Rank	Site	TV	Result	Attendance
August 30	7:30 p.m.	Hawaii*		Arizona Stadium; Tucson, AZ	TNT/TruTV	W 40–6	42,423
September 6	7:00 p.m.	Weber State*		Arizona Stadium; Tucson, AZ	ESPN+	W 48–3	40,038
September 12	6:00 p.m.	Kansas State (Note: Although both Arizona and Kansas State are in the Big 12, this game will not count in conference standings due to the game being scheduled before Arizona joined the Big 12.)*		Arizona Stadium; Tucson, AZ	FOX	W 23–17	40,051
September 27	4:00 p.m.	at No. 14 Iowa State		Jack Trice Stadium; Ames, IA	ESPN	L 14–39	61,500
October 4	12:00 p.m.	Oklahoma State		Arizona Stadium; Tucson, AZ	TNT/TruTV	W 41–13	40,685
October 11	5:00 p.m.	No. 18 BYU		Arizona Stadium; Tucson, AZ	ESPN2	L 27–33 ^{2OT}	47,960
October 18	9:00 a.m.	at Houston		TDECU Stadium; Houston, TX	FS1	L 28–31	28,535
November 1	4:00 p.m.	at Colorado		Folsom Field; Boulder, CO	FS1	W 52–17	48,322
November 8	1:30 p.m.	Kansas^{†}		Arizona Stadium; Tucson, AZ	ESPN2	W 24–20	41,115
November 15	10:00 a.m.	at No. 25 Cincinnati		Nippert Stadium; Cincinnati, OH	FS1	W 30–24	37,099
November 22	11:00 a.m.	Baylor		Casino Del Sol Stadium; Tucson, AZ	TNT	W 41–17	40,199
November 28	7:00 p.m.	at No. 20 Arizona State	No. 25	Mountain America Stadium; Tempe, AZ (rivalry)	FOX	W 23–7	54,037
January 2	6:00 p.m.	vs. SMU*	No. 17	Snapdragon Stadium; San Diego, CA (Holiday Bowl)	FOX	L 19–24	30,602
*Non-conference game; ^{†}Homecoming; Rankings from AP Poll (and CFP Rankings, after November 4) - Released prior to game; All times are in Mountain time

== Rankings ==
Ranking movements Legend: ██ Increase in ranking ██ Decrease in ranking — = Not ranked RV = Received votes
	Week																
Poll	Pre	1	2	3	4	5	6	7	8	9	10	11	12	13	14	15	Final
AP	—	—	—	—	—	—	—	—	—	—	—	—	RV	RV	22	21	RV
Coaches	—	—	—	—	—	—	—	—	—	—	—	RV	RV	RV	22	20	RV
CFP	Not released										—	—	—	25	18	17	Not released

== Game summaries ==
=== vs Hawaii ===
Uniform Combination
Helmet	Jersey	Pants

Hawaii Rainbow Warriors (1–0) at Arizona Wildcats (0–0) – Game summary

Quarter	1	2	3	4	Total
Rainbow Warriors	3	3	0	0	6
Wildcats	7	10	14	9	40

at Arizona Stadium • Tucson, AZ

- Date: August 30, 2025
- Game time: 7:30 p.m.
- Game weather: Clear, 94 °F (34 °C)
- Game attendance: 42,423
- Referee: Stephen Baron
- TV announcers (TNT/TruTV): J.B. Long (play-by-play), Mike Golic Jr. (analyst) and Allie LaForce (sideline reporter)

Game information

First quarter

- (12:11) ARIZ – Kedrick Reescano 13-yard run, Michael Salgado-Medina kick (Drive: 4 plays, 47 yards, 1:21; Arizona 7–0)
- (4:48) HAW – Kansei Matsuzawa 34-yard field goal (Drive: 15 plays, 59 yards, 7:23; Arizona 7–3)

Second quarter

- (12:26) ARIZ – Quincy Craig 54-yard run, Michael Salgado-Medina kick (Drive: 2 plays, 55 yards, 0:33; Arizona 14–3)
- (4:31) ARIZ – Michael Salgado-Medina 35-yard field goal (Drive: 10 plays, 52 yards, 4:31; Arizona 17–3)
- (0:00) HAW – Kansei Matsuzawa 41-yard field goal (Drive: 10 plays, 52 yards, 4:31; Arizona 17–6)

Third quarter

- (12:51) ARIZ – Sam Olson 5-yard pass from Noah Fifita, Michael Salgado-Medina kick (Drive: 6 plays, 65 yards, 2:09; Arizona 24–6)
- (6:46) ARIZ – Noah Fifita 10-yard run, Michael Salgado-Medina kick (Drive: 2 plays, 10 yards, 0:47; Arizona 31–6)

Fourth quarter

- (13:14) ARIZ – Michael Salgado-Medina 52-yard field goal (Drive: 4 plays, -10 yards, 2:10; Arizona 34–6)
- (4:29) ARIZ – Ismail Mahdi 5-yard run, two-point pass failed (Drive: 8 plays, 72 yards, 3:50; Arizona 40–6)

Statistics	HAW	ARIZ
First downs	21	16
Plays–Total yards	76–290	56–344
Rushes–yards	29–67	33–183
Passing yards	223	161
Passing: Comp–Att–Int	26–47–3	13–23–0
Turnovers	5	0
Time of possession	35:44	24:16

Team	Category	Player	Statistics
Hawaii	Passing	Micah Alejado	18/31, 157 yards, INT
Hawaii	Rushing	Landon Sims	9 carries, 41 yards
Hawaii	Receiving	Landon Sims	3 receptions, 48 yards
Arizona	Passing	Noah Fifita	13/23, 161 yards, TD
Arizona	Rushing	Quincy Craig	7 carries, 125 yards, TD
Arizona	Receiving	Brandon Phelps	2 receptions, 50 yards

=== vs Weber State (FCS) ===
Uniform Combination
Helmet	Jersey	Pants

Weber State Wildcats (FCS) (0–1) at Arizona Wildcats (1–0) – Game summary

Quarter	1	2	3	4	Total
Weber State (FCS)	0	0	0	3	3
Arizona	24	10	14	0	48

at Arizona Stadium • Tucson, AZ

- Date: September 6, 2025
- Game time: 7:00 p.m.
- Game weather: Cloudy, 83 °F (28 °C)
- Game attendance: 40,038
- Referee: Tutashinda Salaam
- TV announcers (ESPN+): Ted Emrich (play-by-play) and Jeff Woody (analyst)

Game information

First quarter

- (12:08) ARIZ – Javin Whatley 31-yard pass from Noah Fifita, Michael Salgado-Medina kick (Drive: 6 plays, 75 yards, 2:52; Arizona 7–0)
- (8:56) ARIZ – Javin Whatley 85-yard pass from Noah Fifita, Michael Salgado-Medina kick (Drive: 1 play, 85 yards, 0:12; Arizona 14–0)
- (4:15) ARIZ – Michael Salgado-Medina 32-yard field goal (Drive: 7 plays, 46 yards, 3:43; Arizona 17–0)
- (2:28) ARIZ – Tre Spivey 10-yard pass from Noah Fifita, Michael Salgado-Medina kick (Drive: 2 plays, 12 yards, 0:27; Arizona 24–0)

Second quarter

- (8:51) ARIZ – Michael Salgado-Medina 31-yard field goal (Drive: 14 plays, 74 yards, 6:53; Arizona 27–0)
- (2:16) ARIZ – Brandon Phelps 13-yard pass from Noah Fifita, Michael Salgado-Medina kick (Drive: 7 plays, 81 yards, 3:02; Arizona 34–0)

Third quarter

- (7:44) ARIZ – Ismail Mahdi 27-yard pass from Noah Fifita, Michael Salgado-Medina kick (Drive: 9 plays, 80 yards, 3:47; Arizona 41–0)
- (7:08) ARIZ – Jay'Vion Cole 27-yard interception return, Michael Salgado-Medina kick (Arizona 48–0)

Fourth quarter

- (12:44) WEB – Sloan Calder 33-yard field goal (Drive: 8 plays, 31 yards, 4:02; Arizona 48–3)

Statistics	WEB	ARIZ
First downs	11	31
Plays–yards	55–184	67–556
Rushes–yards	31–116	39–150
Passing yards	68	406
Passing: Comp–Att–Int	10–24–2	20–28–0
Turnovers	2	0
Time of possession	27:21	32:39

Team	Category	Player	Statistics
Weber State	Passing	Jackson Gilkey	10/24, 68 yards, 2 INT
Weber State	Rushing	Jackson Gilkey	9 carries, 40 yards
Weber State	Receiving	Noah Bennee	2 receptions, 20 yards
Arizona	Passing	Noah Fifita	17/22, 373 yards, 5 TD
Arizona	Rushing	Ismail Mahdi	9 carries, 51 yards
Arizona	Receiving	Javin Whatley	5 receptions, 168 yards, 2 TD

=== vs Kansas State ===
Uniform Combination
Helmet	Jersey	Pants

Kansas State Wildcats (1–2) at Arizona Wildcats (2–0) – Game summary

Quarter	1	2	3	4	Total
Kansas State	3	0	14	0	17
Arizona	7	10	3	3	23

at Arizona Stadium • Tucson, AZ

- Date: September 12, 2025
- Game time: 6:00 p.m.
- Game weather: Cloudy, 89 °F (32 °C)
- Game attendance: 40,051
- Referee: Kevin Mar
- TV announcers (Fox): Jason Benetti (play-by-play), Robert Griffin III (analyst) and Alexa Landestoy (sideline reporter)

Game information

First quarter

- (7:42) KSU – Luis Rodriguez 51-yard field goal (Drive: 4 plays, -10 yards, 1:27; Kansas State 3–0)
- (5:01) ARIZ – Noah Fifita 15-yard run, Michael Salgado-Medina kick (Drive: 5 plays, 75 yards, 2:41; Arizona 7–3)

Second quarter

- (10:28) ARIZ – Michael Salgado-Medina 31-yard field goal (Drive: 9 plays, 49 yards, 3:46; Arizona 10–3)
- (4:17) ARIZ – Noah Fifita 2-yard run, Michael Salgado-Medina kick (Drive: 10 plays, 72 yards, 5:15; Arizona 17–3)

Third quarter

- (14:47) KSU – Jayce Brown 75-yard run, Luis Rodriguez kick (Drive: 1 play, 75 yards, 0:13; Arizona 17–10)
- (10:36) KSU – Avery Johnson 1-yard run, Luis Rodriguez kick (Drive: 5 plays, 13 yards, 2:35; Tied 17–17)
- (2:40) ARIZ – Michael Salgado-Medina 31-yard field goal (Drive: 11 plays, 33 yards, 5:21; Arizona 20–17)

Fourth quarter

- (4:25) ARIZ – Michael Salgado-Medina 41-yard field goal (Drive: 14 plays, 58 yards, 7:30; Arizona 23–17)

Statistics	KSU	ARIZ
First downs	8	21
Plays–yards	53–193	79–412
Rushes–yards	24–105	45–234
Passing yards	88	178
Passing: Comp–Att–Int	13–29–0	16–34–1
Turnovers	1	2
Time of possession	23:05	36:55

Team	Category	Player	Statistics
Kansas State	Passing	Avery Johnson	13/29, 88 yards
Kansas State	Rushing	Jayce Brown	1 carry, 75 yards, TD
Kansas State	Receiving	Jayce Brown	6 receptions, 68 yards
Arizona	Passing	Noah Fifita	16/33, 178 yards
Arizona	Rushing	Ismail Mahdi	22 carries, 189 yards
Arizona	Receiving	Chris Hunter	3 receptions, 37 yards

=== at No. 14 Iowa State ===
Uniform Combination
Helmet	Jersey	Pants

Arizona Wildcats (3–0) at No. 14 Iowa State Cyclones (4–0) – Game summary

Quarter	1	2	3	4	Total
Wildcats	0	7	7	0	14
No. 14 Cyclones	8	14	14	3	39

at Jack Trice Stadium • Ames, IA

- Date: September 27, 2025
- Game time: 4:00 p.m.
- Game weather: Clear, 80 °F (27 °C)
- Game attendance: 61,500
- Referee: David Alvarez
- TV announcers (ESPN): Dave Flemming (play-by-play), Brock Osweiler (analyst) and Stormy Buonantony (sideline reporter)

Game information

First quarter

- (5:56) ISU – Rocco Becht 1-yard run, Gabe Burkle run for two-point conversion (Drive: 9 plays, 72 yards, 4:21; Iowa State 8–0)

Second quarter

- (12:41) ISU – Carson Hansen 1-yard run, Chase Smith kick (Drive: 6 plays, 38 yards, 2:31; Iowa State 15–0)
- (2:52) ISU – Carson Hansen 3-yard run, Chase Smith kick (Drive: 4 plays, 30 yards, 1:59; Iowa State 22–0)
- (0:22) ARIZ – Kris Hutson 9-yard pass from Noah Fifita, Michael Salgado-Medina kick (Drive: 12 plays, 69 yards, 2:24; Iowa State 22–7)

Third quarter

- (11:30) ISU – Rocco Becht 1-yard run, Chase Smith kick (Drive: 7 plays, 75 yards, 3:30; Iowa State 29–7)
- (8:08) ISU – Rocco Becht 1-yard run, Chase Smith kick (Drive: 3 plays, 44 yards, 0:48; Iowa State 36–7)
- (2:46) ARIZ – Tre Spivey 1-yard pass from Noah Fifita, Michael Salgado-Medina kick (Drive: 12 plays, 74 yards, 5:18; Iowa State 36–14)

Fourth quarter

- (0:43) ISU – Chase Smith 34-yard field goal (Drive: 7 plays, 34 yards, 1:32; Iowa State 39–14)

Statistics	ARIZ	ISU
First downs	20	19
Plays–yards	72–360	69–399
Rushes–yards	24–107	47–111
Passing yards	253	288
Passing: Comp–Att–Int	32–48–2	15–22–1
Turnovers	2	1
Time of possession	28:55	31:05

Team	Category	Player	Statistics
Arizona	Passing	Noah Fifita	32/48, 253 yards, 2 TD, 2 INT
Arizona	Rushing	Ismail Mahdi	13 carries, 85 yards
Arizona	Receiving	Kris Hutson	6 receptions, 67 yards, TD
Iowa State	Passing	Rocco Becht	14/20, 243 yards, INT
Iowa State	Rushing	Carson Hansen	19 carries, 63 yards, 2 TD
Iowa State	Receiving	Chase Sowell	4 receptions, 146 yards

=== vs Oklahoma State ===
Uniform Combination
Helmet	Jersey	Pants

Oklahoma State Cowboys (1–3) at Arizona Wildcats (3–1) – Game summary

Quarter	1	2	3	4	Total
Cowboys	3	3	0	7	13
Wildcats	14	10	14	3	41

at Arizona Stadium • Tucson, AZ

- Date: October 4, 2025
- Game time: 12:00 p.m.
- Game weather: Sunny, 85 °F (29 °C)
- Game attendance: 40,689
- Referee: Luke Richmond
- TV announcers (TNT/TruTV): J.B. Long (play-by-play), Mike Golic Jr. (analyst) and Jared Greenberg (sideline reporter)

Game information

First quarter

- (10:08) ARIZ – Tre Spivey 13-yard pass from Noah Fifita, Michael Salgado-Medina kick (Drive: 11 plays, 75 yards, 4:52; Arizona 7–0)
- (5:59) OKST – Logan Ward 47-yard field goal (Drive: 6 plays, 31 yards, 1:10; Arizona 7–3)
- (1:26) ARIZ – Tre Spivey 22-yard pass from Noah Fifita, Michael Salgado-Medina kick (Drive: 10 plays, 75 yards, 4:33; Arizona 14–3)

Second quarter

- (6:20) ARIZ – Luke Wysong 47-yard pass from Noah Fifita, Michael Salgado-Medina kick (Drive: 6 plays, 83 yards, 3:10; Arizona 21–3)
- (1:05) OKST – Logan Ward 46-yard field goal (Drive: 7 plays, 18 yards, 2:37; Arizona 21–6)
- (0:00) ARIZ – Michael Salgado-Medina 34-yard field goal (Drive: 8 plays, 59 yards, 1:05; Arizona 24–6)

Third quarter

- (2:58) ARIZ – Javin Whatley 21-yard pass from Noah Fifita, Michael Salgado-Medina kick (Drive: 3 plays, 38 yards, 1:14; Arizona 31–6)
- (1:51) ARIZ – Chris Hunter 29-yard pass from Noah Fifita, Michael Salgado-Medina kick (Drive: 1 play, 29 yards, 0:07; Arizona 38–6)

Fourth quarter

- (8:40) OKST – LaDainian Fields 55-yard interception return, Logan Ward kick (Arizona 38–13)
- (4:12) ARIZ – Michael Salgado-Medina 57-yard field goal (Drive: 9 plays, 36 yards, 4:28; Arizona 41–13)

Statistics	OKST	ARIZ
First downs	7	28
Plays–yards	59–158	76–478
Rushes–yards	31–89	33–45
Passing yards	69	433
Passing: Comp–Att–Int	13–28–1	31–43–2
Turnovers	2	3
Time of possession	25:30	34:30

Team	Category	Player	Statistics
Oklahoma State	Passing	Zane Flores	9/20, 47 yards, INT
Oklahoma State	Rushing	Zane Flores	5 carries, 31 yards
Oklahoma State	Receiving	Gavin Freeman	3 receptions, 26 yards
Arizona	Passing	Noah Fifita	28/38, 376 yards, 5 TD, INT
Arizona	Rushing	Ismail Mahdi	14 carries, 34 yards
Arizona	Receiving	Luke Wysong	5 receptions, 92 yards, TD

=== vs No. 18 BYU ===
Uniform Combination
Helmet	Jersey	Pants

No. 18 BYU Cougars (5–0) at Arizona Wildcats (4–1) – Game summary

Quarter	1	2	3	4	OT	2OT	Total
No. 18 Cougars	14	0	0	10	3	6	33
Wildcats	7	10	0	7	3	0	27

at Arizona Stadium • Tucson, AZ

- Date: October 11, 2025
- Game time: 5:00 p.m.
- Game weather: Cloudy, 76 °F (24 °C)
- Game attendance: 47,960
- Referee: Michael VanderVelde
- TV announcers (ESPN2): Mike Couzens (play-by-play), Kirk Morrison (analyst) and Dawn Davenport (sideline reporter)

Game information

First quarter

- (8:55) BYU – LJ Martin 28-yard run, Will Ferrin kick (Drive: 8 plays, 66 yards, 3:21; BYU 7–0)
- (4:15) BYU – Parker Kingston 75-yard pass from Bear Bachmeier, Will Ferrin kick (Drive: 4 plays, 94 yards, 2:18; BYU 14–0)
- (0:32) ARIZ – Kris Hutson 17-yard pass from Noah Fifita, Michael Salgado-Medina kick (Drive: 8 plays, 75 yards, 3:43; BYU 14–7)

Second quarter

- (9:32) ARIZ – Michael Salgado-Medina 24-yard field goal (Drive: 10 plays, 38 yards, 3:19; BYU 14–10)
- (0:40) ARIZ – Chris Hunter 35-yard pass from Noah Fifita, Michael Salgado-Medina kick (Drive: 8 plays, 76 yards, 1:58; Arizona 17–14)

Third quarter

- None

Fourth quarter

- (11:14) ARIZ – Kedrick Reescano 36-yard run, Michael Salgado-Medina kick (Drive: 10 plays, 74 yards, 4:02; Arizona 24–14)
- (4:08) BYU – Will Ferrin 24-yard field goal (Drive: 15 plays, 69 yards, 7:06; Arizona 24–17)
- (0:19) BYU – Bear Bachmeier 2-yard run, Will Ferrin kick (Drive: 11 plays, 47 yards, 2:36; Tied 24–24)

First overtime

- ARIZ – Michael Salgado-Medina 23-yard field goal. (Drive: 6 plays, 20 yards; Arizona 27–24)
- BYU – Will Ferrin 45-yard field goal. (Drive: 4 plays, -2 yards; Tied 27–27)

Second overtime

- BYU – Bear Bachmeier 7-yard run, two-point pass failed (Drive: 5 plays, 25 yards; BYU 33–27)

Statistics	BYU	ARIZ
First downs	23	23
Plays–yards	80–430	79–383
Rushes–yards	51–258	34–164
Passing yards	172	219
Passing: Comp–Att–Int	12–29–2	25–45–1
Turnovers	2	1
Time of possession	32:47	27:13

Team	Category	Player	Statistics
BYU	Passing	Bear Bachmeier	12/29, 172 yards, TD, 2 INT
BYU	Rushing	LJ Martin	25 carries, 162 yards, TD
BYU	Receiving	Parker Kingston	5 receptions, 117 yards, TD
Arizona	Passing	Noah Fifita	25/45, 219 yards, 2 TD, INT
Arizona	Rushing	Kedrick Reescano	13 carries, 90 yards, TD
Arizona	Receiving	Kris Hutson	9 receptions, 106 yards, TD

=== at Houston ===
Uniform Combination
Helmet	Jersey	Pants

Arizona Wildcats (4–2) at Houston Cougars (5–1) – Game summary

Quarter	1	2	3	4	Total
Wildcats	14	0	0	14	28
Cougars	7	14	7	3	31

at TDECU Stadium • Houston, TX

- Date: October 18, 2025
- Game time: 9:00 a.m.
- Game weather: Cloudy, 85 °F (29 °C)
- Game attendance: 28,535
- Referee: Kevin Boitmann
- TV announcers (FS1): Eric Collins (play-by-play) and Spencer Tillman (analyst)

Game information

First quarter

- (13:42) ARIZ – Tre Spivey 70-yard pass from Noah Fifita, Michael Salgado-Medina kick (Drive: 3 plays, 75 yards, 1:18; Arizona 7–0)
- (12:00) HOU – Amare Thomas 52-yard pass from Conner Weigman, Ethan Sanchez kick (Drive: 4 plays, 75 yards, 1:42; Tied 7–7)
- (6:18) ARIZ – Luke Wysong 13-yard pass from Noah Fifita, Michael Salgado-Medina kick (Drive: 11 plays, 73 yards, 5:36; Arizona 14–7)

Second quarter

- (5:51) HOU – Conner Weigman 10-yard run, Ethan Sanchez kick (Drive: 13 plays, 96 yards, 6:38; Tied 14–14)
- (0:16) HOU – Tanner Koziol 15-yard pass from Conner Weigman, Ethan Sanchez kick (Drive: 9 plays, 69 yards, 1:20; Houston 21–14)

Third quarter

- (5:56) HOU – Amare Thomas 2-yard pass from Conner Weigman, Ethan Sanchez kick (Drive: 17 plays, 75 yards, 9:04; Houston 28–14)

Fourth quarter

- (14:55) ARIZ – Tre Spivey 3-yard run, Michael Salgado-Medina kick (Drive: 13 plays, 75 yards, 6:01; Houston 28–21)
- (4:48) ARIZ – Kedrick Reescano 2-yard run, Michael Salgado-Medina kick (Drive: 10 plays, 70 yards, 6:52; Tied 28–28)
- (0:00) HOU – Ethan Sanchez 41-yard field goal (Drive: 13 plays, 52 yards, 4:48; Houston 31–28)

Statistics	ARIZ	HOU
First downs	23	23
Plays–yards	57–381	68–396
Rushes–yards	31–112	45–232
Passing yards	269	164
Passing: Comp–Att–Int	24–26–0	15–23–0
Turnovers	0	0
Time of possession	30:28	29:32

Team	Category	Player	Statistics
Arizona	Passing	Noah Fifita	24/26, 269 yards, 2 TD
Arizona	Rushing	Ismail Mahdi	6 carries, 42 yards
Arizona	Receiving	Tre Spivey	1 reception, 70 yards, TD
Houston	Passing	Conner Weigman	15/23, 164 yards, 3 TD
Houston	Rushing	Dean Connors	20 carries, 100 yards
Houston	Receiving	Amare Thomas	4 receptions, 69 yards, 2 TD

=== at Colorado ===
Uniform Combination
Helmet	Jersey	Pants

Arizona Wildcats (4–3) at Colorado Buffaloes (3–5) – Game summary

Quarter	1	2	3	4	Total
Wildcats	17	21	14	0	52
Buffaloes	0	7	7	3	17

at Folsom Field • Boulder, CO

- Date: November 1, 2025
- Game time: 4:00 p.m.
- Game weather: Clear, 64 °F (18 °C)
- Game attendance: 48,322
- Referee: Henry Johns
- TV announcers (FS1): Tim Brando (play-by-play), Devin Gardner (analyst) and Josh Sims (sideline reporter)

Game information

First quarter

- (13:53) ARIZ – Tre Spivey 57-yard pass from Noah Fifita, Michael Salgado-Medina kick (Drive: 3 plays, 75 yards, 1:07; Arizona 7–0)
- (7:56) ARIZ – Michael Salgado-Medina 49-yard field goal (Drive: 8 plays, 19 yards, 3:35; Arizona 10–0)
- (7:08) ARIZ – Kris Hutson 12-yard pass from Noah Fifita, Michael Salgado-Medina kick (Drive: 1 play, 12 yards, 0:06; Arizona 17–0)

Second quarter

- (14:28) COLO – Omarion Miller 8-yard pass from Kaidon Salter, Alejandro Mata kick (Drive: 17 plays, 75 yards, 7:40; Arizona 17–7)
- (12:38) ARIZ – Gio Richardson 60-yard pass from Noah Fifita, Michael Salgado-Medina kick (Drive: 4 plays, 75 yards, 1:50; Arizona 24–7)
- (4:53) ARIZ – Javin Whatley 13-yard run, Michael Salgado-Medina kick (Drive: 2 plays, 8 yards, 0:46; Arizona 31–7)
- (0:21) ARIZ – Javin Whatley 34-yard pass from Noah Fifita, Michael Salgado-Medina kick (Drive: 9 plays, 65 yards, 2:35; Arizona 38–7)

Third quarter

- (12:06) ARIZ – Ismail Mahdi 7-yard run, Michael Salgado-Medina kick (Drive: 2 plays, 17 yards, 0:47; Arizona 45–7)
- (10:13) COLO – Omarion Miller 59-yard pass from Julian Lewis, Alejandro Mata kick (Drive: 5 plays, 75 yards, 1:53; Arizona 45–14)
- (9:11) ARIZ – Kedrick Reescano 1-yard run, Michael Salgado-Medina kick (Drive: 4 plays, 75 yards, 1:02; Arizona 52–14)

Fourth quarter

- (2:04) COLO – Alejandro Mata 31-yard field goal (Drive: 5 plays, 21 yards, 2:19; Arizona 52–17)

Statistics	ARIZ	COLO
First downs	16	16
Plays–yards	63–417	77–299
Rushes–yards	38–204	42–129
Passing yards	213	170
Passing: Comp–Att–Int	11–25–0	20–35–3
Turnovers	2	5
Time of possession	25:51	34:09

Team	Category	Player	Statistics
Arizona	Passing	Noah Fifita	11/19, 213 yards, 4 TD
Arizona	Rushing	Ismail Mahdi	3 carries, 85 yards, TD
Arizona	Receiving	Gio Richardson	2 receptions, 63 yards, TD
Colorado	Passing	Julian Lewis	9/17, 121 yards, TD
Colorado	Rushing	Dallan Hayden	9 carries, 34 yards
Colorado	Receiving	Omarion Miller	5 receptions, 91 yards, 2 TD

=== vs Kansas ===
Uniform Combination
Helmet	Jersey	Pants

Kansas Jayhawks (5–4) at Arizona Wildcats (5–3) – Game summary

Quarter	1	2	3	4	Total
Jayhawks	7	10	3	0	20
Wildcats	7	7	3	7	24

at Arizona Stadium • Tucson, AZ

- Date: November 8, 2025
- Game time: 1:30 p.m.
- Game weather: Sunny, 82 °F (28 °C)
- Game attendance: 41,115
- Referee: Michael VanderVelde
- TV announcers (ESPN2): Mike Monaco (play-by-play), Kirk Morrison (analyst) and Dawn Davenport (sideline)

Game information

First quarter

- (7:16) ARIZ – Sam Olson 16-yard pass from Noah Fifita, Michael Salgado-Medina kick (Drive: 8 plays, 78 yards, 3:15; Arizona 7–0)
- (0:32) KAN – Jalon Daniels 1-yard run, Laith Marjan kick (Drive: 5 plays, 46 yards, 2:05; Tied 7–7)

Second quarter

- (11:17) KAN – Emmanuel Henderson 24-yard pass from Jalon Daniels, Laith Marjan kick (Drive: 6 plays, 78 yards, 3:01; Kansas 14–7)
- (4:15) KAN – Laith Marjan 46-yard field goal (Drive: 8 plays, 29 yards, 4:03; Kansas 17–7)
- (0:23) ARIZ – Quincy Craig 8-yard pass from Noah Fifita, Michael Salgado-Medina kick (Drive: 11 plays, 75 yards, 3:52; Kansas 17–14)

Third quarter

- (11:23) ARIZ – Michael Salgado-Medina 41-yard field goal (Drive: 6 plays, 62 yards, 2:04; Tied 17–17)
- (5:51) KAN – Laith Marjan 50-yard field goal (Drive: 10 plays, 43 yards, 5:32; Kansas 20–17)

Fourth quarter

- (0:39) ARIZ – Quincy Craig 24-yard run, Michael Salgado-Medina kick (Drive: 8 plays, 80 yards, 2:00; Arizona 24–20)

Statistics	KAN	ARIZ
First downs	19	18
Plays–yards	70–369	60–323
Rushes–yards	40–170	29–165
Passing yards	199	158
Passing: Comp–Att–Int	15–30–0	16–31–0
Turnovers	0	0
Time of possession	35:30	24:10

Team	Category	Player	Statistics
Kansas	Passing	Jalon Daniels	15/29, 199 yards, TD
Kansas	Rushing	Jalon Daniels	14 carries, 74 yards, TD
Kansas	Receiving	Emmanuel Henderson	5 receptions, 65 yards, TD
Arizona	Passing	Noah Fifita	16/31, 158 yards, 2 TD
Arizona	Rushing	Ismail Mahdi	7 carries, 61 yards
Arizona	Receiving	Gio Richardson	2 receptions, 38 yards

=== at No. 25 Cincinnati ===
Uniform Combination
Helmet	Jersey	Pants

Arizona Wildcats (6–3) at No. 25 Cincinnati Bearcats (7–2) – Game summary

Quarter	1	2	3	4	Total
Wildcats	7	3	10	10	30
No. 25 Bearcats	14	0	3	7	24

at Nippert Stadium • Cincinnati, OH

- Date: November 15, 2025
- Game time: 10:00 a.m.
- Game weather: Cloudy, 63 °F (17 °C)
- Game attendance: 37,099
- Referee: David Alvarez
- TV announcers (FS1): Connor Onion (play-by-play) and Mark Helfrich (analyst)

Game information

First quarter

- (14:03) ARIZ – Ismail Mahdi 27-yard run, Michael Salgado-Medina kick (Drive: 2 plays, 26 yards, 0:49; Arizona 7–0)
- (11:07) CIN – Brendan Sorsby 4-yard run, Stephen Rusnak kick (Drive: 6 plays, 75 yards, 2:57; Tied 7–7)
- (6:34) CIN – Jeff Caldwell 7-yard pass from Brendan Sorsby, Stephen Rusnak kick (Drive: 5 plays, 74 yards, 2:42; Cincinnati 14–7)

Second quarter

- (0:04) ARIZ – Michael Salgado-Medina 24-yard field goal (Drive: 11 plays, 58 yards, 4:46; Cincinnati 14–10)

Third quarter

- (9:42) ARIZ – Michael Salgado-Medina 25-yard field goal (Drive: 11 plays, 68 yards, 5:18; Cincinnati 14–13)
- (5:20) ARIZ – Kedrick Reescano 50-yard run, Michael Salgado-Medina kick (Drive: 6 plays, 99 yards, 2:29; Arizona 20–14)
- (0:00) CIN – Stephen Rusnak 28-yard field goal (Drive: 12 plays, 66 yards, 5:21; Arizona 20–17)

Fourth quarter

- (10:53) ARIZ – Gio Richardson 15-yard pass from Noah Fifita, Michael Salgado-Medina kick (Drive: 9 plays, 75 yards, 4:07; Arizona 27–17)
- (6:38) CIN – Zion Johnson 1-yard run, Stephen Rusnak kick (Drive: 12 plays, 75 yards, 4:15; Arizona 27–24)
- (1:34) ARIZ – Michael Salgado-Medina 51-yard field goal (Drive: 11 plays, 42 yards, 5:04; Arizona 30–24)

Statistics	ARIZ	CIN
First downs	24	14
Plays–yards	73–475	57–344
Rushes–yards	42–181	29–190
Passing yards	294	154
Passing: Comp–Att–Int	23–31–0	15–28–2
Turnovers	0	2
Time of possession	36:41	23:19

Team	Category	Player	Statistics
Arizona	Passing	Noah Fifita	23/31, 294 yards, TD
Arizona	Rushing	Kedrick Reescano	13 carries, 94 yards, TD
Arizona	Receiving	Kris Hutson	8 receptions, 123 yards
Cincinnati	Passing	Brendan Sorsby	15/28, 154 yards, TD, 2 INT
Cincinnati	Rushing	Tawee Walker	12 carries, 119 yards
Cincinnati	Receiving	Jeff Caldwell	5 receptions, 68 yards, TD

=== vs Baylor ===
Uniform Combination
Helmet	Jersey	Pants

Baylor Bears (5–5) at Arizona Wildcats (7–3) – Game summary

Quarter	1	2	3	4	Total
Bears	14	3	0	0	17
Wildcats	7	7	7	20	41

at Casino Del Sol Stadium • Tucson, AZ

- Date: November 22, 2025
- Game time: 11:00 a.m.
- Game weather: Cloudy, 69 °F (21 °C)
- Game attendance: 40,199
- Referee: Carvonne Barrett
- TV announcers (TNT): J.B. Long (play-by-play), Mike Golic Jr. (analyst) and Bridget Howard (sideline)

Game information

First quarter

- (12:05) BAY – Josh Cameron 9-yard pass from Sawyer Robertson, Connor Hawkins kick (Drive: 7 plays, 75 yards, 2:55; Baylor 7–0)
- (7:46) ARIZ – Kedrick Reescano 2-yard run, Michael Salgado-Medina kick (Drive: 10 plays, 75 yards, 4:19; Tied 7–7)
- (0:40) BAY – Sawyer Robertson 2-yard run, Drive kick (Drive: 17 plays, 75 yards, 7:06; Baylor 14–7)

Second quarter

- (8:59) ARIZ – Kris Hutson 2-yard pass from Noah Fifita, Michael Salgado-Medina kick (Drive: 13 plays, 82 yards, 6:35; Tied 14–14)
- (0:00) BAY – Connor Hawkins 48-yard field goal (Drive: 9 plays, 30 yards, 1:51; Baylor 17–14)

Third quarter

- (11:49) ARIZ – Kedrick Reescano 1-yard run, Michael Salgado-Medina kick (Drive: 8 plays, 75 yards, 3:11; Arizona 21–17)

Fourth quarter

- (10:31) ARIZ – Ismail Mahdi 28-yard run, Michael Salgado-Medina kick (Drive: 1 play, 28 yards, 0:06; Arizona 28–17)
- (6:38) ARIZ – Kedrick Reescano 19-yard run, Michael Salgado-Medina kick (Drive: 4 plays, 32 yards, 2:27; Arizona 35–17)
- (6:27) ARIZ – Jabari Mann 34-yard interception return, kick failed (Arizona 41–17)

Statistics	BAY	ARIZ
First downs	20	22
Plays–yards	78–343	60–355
Rushes–yards	45–181	35–172
Passing yards	162	183
Passing: Comp–Att–Int	22–33–2	14–25–1
Turnovers	3	1
Time of possession	32:48	27:12

Team	Category	Player	Statistics
Baylor	Passing	Sawyer Robertson	22/33, 162 yards, TD, 2 INT
Baylor	Rushing	Caden Knighten	17 carries, 100 yards
Baylor	Receiving	Josh Cameron	6 receptions, 71 yards, TD
Arizona	Passing	Noah Fifita	14/25, 183 yards, TD, INT
Arizona	Rushing	Ismail Mahdi	14 carries, 93 yards, TD
Arizona	Receiving	Kris Hutson	9 receptions, 133 yards, TD

=== at No. 20 Arizona State (Territorial Cup) ===
Uniform Combination
Helmet	Jersey	Pants

No. 25 Arizona Wildcats (8–3) at No. 20 Arizona State Sun Devils (8–3) – Game summary

Quarter	1	2	3	4	Total
No. 25 Wildcats	0	3	10	10	23
No. 20 Sun Devils	0	7	0	0	7

at Mountain America Stadium • Tempe, AZ

- Date: November 28, 2025
- Game time: 7:00 p.m.
- Game weather: Sunny, 66 °F (19 °C)
- Game attendance: 54,037
- Referee: Eric Carmouche
- TV announcers (FOX): Tim Brando (play-by-play), Devin Gardner (analyst), and Josh Sims (sideline reporter)

Game information

First quarter

- No scoring plays.

Second quarter

- (10:33) ASU – Jeff Sims 27-yard run, Jesus Gomez kick (Drive: 8 plays, 90 yards, 3:53; Arizona State 7–0)
- (0:01) ARIZ – Michael Salgado-Medina 47-yard field goal (Drive: 7 plays, 40 yards, 1:18; Arizona State 7–3)

Third quarter

- (11:36) ARIZ – Cameron Barmore 9-yard pass from Noah Fifita, Michael Salgado-Medina kick (Drive: 2 plays, 6 yards, 0:46; Arizona 10–7)
- (1:17) ARIZ – Michael Salgado-Medina 49-yard field goal (Drive: 16 plays, 63 yards, 6:00; Arizona 13–7)

Fourth quarter

- (12:05) ARIZ – Michael Salgado-Medina 29-yard field goal (Drive: 8 plays, 49 yards, 2:36; Arizona 16–7)
- (1:56) ARIZ – Kedrick Reescano 1-yard run, Michael Salgado-Medina kick (Drive: 14 plays, 87 yards, 6:15; Arizona 23–7)

Statistics	ARIZ	ASU
First downs	24	12
Plays–yards	89–374	52–214
Rushes–yards	44–88	27–100
Passing yards	286	114
Passing: comp–att–int	28–45–0	11–25–3
Turnovers	1	5
Time of possession	40:01	19:59

Team	Category	Player	Statistics
Arizona	Passing	Noah Fifita	28/45, 286 yards, TD
Arizona	Rushing	Ismail Mahdi	14 carries, 53 yards
Arizona	Receiving	Kris Hutson	7 receptions, 95 yards
Arizona State	Passing	Jeff Sims	11/25, 114 yards, 3 INT
Arizona State	Rushing	Raleek Brown	13 carries, 63 yards
Arizona State	Receiving	Malik McClain	4 receptions, 57 yards

=== vs. SMU (2026 Holiday Bowl) ===
Uniform Combination
Helmet	Jersey	Pants

2026 Trust & Will Holiday Bowl
No. 17 Arizona Wildcats (9–3) vs SMU Mustangs (8–4) – Game summary

Quarter	1	2	3	4	Total
No. 17 Wildcats	0	0	6	13	19
Mustangs	14	10	0	0	24

at Snapdragon Stadium • San Diego, CA

- Date: January 2, 2026
- Game time: 6:00 p.m. MST
- Game weather: Partly cloudy • Temperature: 65 °F (18 °C) • Wind: S at 10 mph (16 km/h)
- Game attendance: 30,602
- Referee: Steve Marlowe (SEC)
- TV announcers (FOX): Gus Johnson (play-by-play), Joel Klatt (analyst) and Jenny Taft (sideline)

Game information

First quarter

- SMU – T.J. Harden 1-yard run (Sam Keltner kick), 13:58. Mustangs 7–0. Drive: 3 plays, 83 yards, 0:56.
- SMU – T.J. Harden 3-yard run (Sam Keltner kick), 4:16. Mustangs 14–0. Drive: 8 plays, 87 yards, 3:12.

Second quarter

- SMU – Stone Eby 1-yard run (Sam Keltner kick), 9:33. Mustangs 21–0. Drive: 16 plays, 94 yards, 6:47.
- SMU – Sam Keltner 24-yard field goal, 0:29. Mustangs 24–0. Drive: 13 plays, 58 yards, 4:54.

Third quarter

- ARIZ – Javin Whatley 28-yard pass from Noah Fifita (run failed), 2:37. Mustangs 24–6. Drive: 15 plays, 96 yards, 7:31.

Fourth quarter

- ARIZ – Tre Spivey 10-yard pass from Noah Fifita (pass failed), 8:40. Mustangs 24–12. Drive: 10 plays, 66 yards, 5:23.
- ARIZ – Cam Barmore 15-yard pass from Noah Fifita (Michael Salgado-Medina kick), 0:33. Mustangs 24–19. Drive: 12 plays, 75 yards, 2:10.

Statistics	ARIZ	SMU
First downs	26	18
Plays–yards	79–441	64–392
Rushes–yards	36–176	32–114
Passing yards	265	278
Passing: Comp–Att–Int	28–43–1	21–32–3
Turnovers	1	3
Time of possession	33:12	26:48

Team	Category	Player	Statistics
Arizona	Passing	Noah Fifita	28/43, 265 yards, 3 TD, INT
Arizona	Rushing	Noah Fifita	13 carries, 73 yards
Arizona	Receiving	Cam Barmore	5 receptions, 61 yards, TD
SMU	Passing	Kevin Jennings	21/32, 278 yards, 3 INT
SMU	Rushing	T.J. Harden	10 carries, 40 yards, 2 TD
SMU	Receiving	Yamir Knight	7 receptions, 104 yards

== Personnel ==
=== Roster ===
2025 Arizona Wildcats football team roster
Players
Coaches
Offense

Pos.	#	Name	Class
RB	0	Wesley Yarbrough	Fr
QB	1	Noah Fifita (C)	Jr
WR	2	Jeremiah Patterson	Sr
RB	3	Kedrick Reescano	Jr
WR	4	Kris Hutson	Sr
WR	5	Gio Richardson	Fr
WR	6	Javin Whatley	Sr
QB	7	Sawyer Anderson	Fr
QB	8	Braedyn Locke	Jr
RB	9	Cornelius Warren III	Fr
WR	10	Rex Haynes	Jr
WR	11	Chris Hunter	Jr
WR	12	Tre Spivey III	So
WR	13	Devin Hyatt	Fr
QB	14	Mason Bray	Fr
WR	15	Luke Wysong	Sr
QB	16	Luke Haugo	Fr
WR	17	Isaiah Mizell	Fr
WR	18	Brandon Phelps	Fr
WR	19	Jaden Clark	Jr
RB	21	Ismail Mahdi	Sr
RB	24	Quincy Craig	Jr
RB	28	Anthony Wilhite	Jr
TE	30	Kayden Luke	So
RB	44	Chase Randall	Jr
OL	50	Ise Matautia	Sr
OL	52	Ka'ena DeCarmbra	Sr
OL	54	Keona Peat	So
OL	55	Chubba Ma'ae	Sr
OL	56	Sione Tohi	Fr
OL	58	Chance Roberts	Sr
OL	59	Rhino Tapa'atoutai	So
OL	62	Javian Goo	Fr
OL	63	Alexander Doost	So
OL	67	Jaxon Griffin	Fr
OL	70	Zarius Wells	So
OL	71	Tristan Bounds	Sr
OL	72	Louis Akpa	Fr
OL	73	Matthew Lado	Fr
OL	74	Siale Uluave	Jr
OL	75	Ty Buchanan	Sr
OL	76	Jordan Brown	Sr
OL	77	Michael Wooten	Jr
OL	78	Grayson Stovall	Jr
OL	79	Issac Perez	Jr
TE	80	Cameron Paramore	Sr
WR	81	Scotty Brennan	Fr
WR	82	Landon Kelsey	Fr
TE	84	Sam Olson	Sr
TE	85	Kellan Ford	Fr
TE	86	John Hart	Jr
TE	87	Tyler Powell	So
TE	88	Keyan Burnett	Sr
WR	89	Jordan McCord	Fr

Defense

Pos.	#	Name	Class
DL	0	Deshawn McKnight	Sr
DL	2	Treydan Stukes (C)	Sr
DL	3	Tre Smith	Sr
LB	4	Max Harris	Sr
DB	5	Marquis Groves-Killebrew	Jr
LB	6	Taye Brown	Jr
LB	7	Chase Kennedy	Jr
DB	8	Jay'Vion Cole	Jr
DB	9	Ayden Garnes	Sr
LB	10	Myron Robinson	Fr
LB	11	Jabari Mann	Fr
DB	12	Genesis Smith	Jr
DB	13	Jack Luttrell	So
LB	14	Stacy Bey	Fr
LB	16	Riley Wilson	Sr
DB	17	Jshawn Frausto-Ramos	Jr
LB	18	Carter Jones	Fr
DB	20	Dajon Hamilton	Fr
DB	21	Johno Price	So
DB	24	Gavin Hunter	So
DB	25	Michael Dansby	Sr
DB	26	Coleman Patmon	Fr
DB	27	Gianna Edwards	Fr
DB	28	Swayde Griffin	Fr
DB	29	Devin Dunn	Jr
DB	31	Arian Parish	So
DB	32	Nela Taliauli	Fr
DB	33	Kason Brown	Fr
DB	35	Quinn Olson	Fr
LB	36	Dominic Hanger	So
LB	40	Brandon Craddock	Jr
DL	41	Julian Savaiinaea	So
DL	42	Dominic Lolesio	So
DB	43	Dalton Johnson	Sr
DL	44	Malachi Bailey	Sr
LB	45	Blake Gotcher	Sr
DL	47	Ammon Kaufusi	Jr
LB	51	Tyler Mustain	So
DL	53	Christian Madoski	So
LB	55	Leviticus Su'a	So
DL	90	Chancellor Owens	Jr
DL	91	Porter Patton	Fr
DL	93	Jarra Anderson	So
DL	94	Edukwa Okundaye	Fr
DL	95	Leroy Palu	Jr
DL	97	Tiaoalii Savea	Sr
DL	99	Mays Pese	Fr

Special teams

Pos.	#	Name	Class
PK	19	Michael Salgado-Medina	So
PK	31	Ian Wagner	Sr
PK/P	33	Tyler Prasuhn	Fr
LS	39	Broden Molen	Fr
LS	41	Avery Salerno	Sr
P	49	Jordan Forbes	So

Head coach

- Brent Brennan

Coordinators/assistant coaches

- Seth Doege – Offensive coordinator
- Danny Gonzales – Defensive coordinator
- Chip Vaney – Defensive backs
- Josh Bringuel - Linebackers
- Alonzo Carter – Running backs
- Josh Oglesby – offensive linemen/Run game coordinator
- Josh Miller – Tight Ends/Pass game coordinator
- Joe Salave'a – Associate HC/Defensive linemen
- Bobby Wade – Wide receivers
- Brett Arce – Stars Coach
- Craig Naivar – Special teams coordinator

Legend

- (C) Team captain
- (S) Suspended
- (I) Ineligible
- Injured
- Redshirt

Roster
Last update: 07/16/2025

=== Depth chart ===
- Depth chart is a projection and is subject to change.

Defense
4-3

FS
Dalton Johnson
Coleman Patmon
-

WOLF	MIKE	STINGER
Chase Kennedy	Max Harris	Taye Brown
Riley Wilson	Leviticus Su'a	Jabari Mann
-	-	-

SS
Treydan Stukes
Gavin Hunter
-

CB
Michael Dansby
Ayden Garnes
Johno Price

DE	DT	DT	DE
Dominic Lolesio	Leroy Palu	Tiaoalii Savea	Tre Smith
Malachi Bailey	Deshawn McKnight	Julian Savaiinaea	Mays Pese
-	Jarra Anderson	-	-

CB
Marquis Groves-Killebrew
Jay'vion Cole
-

Offense
Pro-style

WR
Kris Hutson
Brandon Phelps
Isaiah Mizell

WR
Chris Hunter
Tre Spivey
Devin Hyatt
Rex Haynes

LT	LG	C	RG	RT
Ty Buchanan	Michael Wooten	Ka'ena Decambra	Alexander Doost	Tristan Bounds
Matthew Lado	Chubba Maae	Grayson Stovall	Ise Matautia	Rhino Tapa'atoutai
-	-	-	Issac Perez	-

TE
Sam Olson
Tyler Powell
Cameron Barmore
Keyan Burnett

WR
Javin Whatley
Gio Richardson
-

QB
Noah Fifita
Braedyn Locke
-

Key reserves
Offense
Defense
Special teams
Out (indefinitely)
Out (season)
Out (suspended)
Out (retired)

RB
Kendrick Reescano
Ismail Mahdi
Quincy Craig

Special teams
PK Michael Salgado-Medina
PK Tyler Prasuhn
P Michael Salgado-Medina
P Issac Lovison
KR Ismail Mahdi
Quincy Craig
PR Jeremiah Patterson
Kris Hutson
LS Avery Salerno
Braden Molen
H Ian Wagner

True Freshman
Double Position : *
projected Depth Chart Week 1 vs TBA

== Statistics ==
=== Scoring ===
==== Arizona vs. non-conference opponents ====
	1	2	3	4	Total
Opponents	6	3	14	3	26
Arizona	38	30	31	12	111

==== Arizona vs. Big 12 opponents ====
	1	2	3	4	OT	Total
Big 12 opponents	67	58	34	33	9	201
Arizona	73	68	65	74	3	283

==== Arizona vs. all opponents ====
	1	2	3	4	OT	Total
Opponents	73	61	48	36	9	227
Arizona	111	102	96	86	3	398

== Awards and honors ==
Big 12 Weekly Honors
Date	Player	Class	Position	Award	Ref.
Week 3 (Sept 15)	Ismail Mahdi	RB	Graduate	Big 12 Offensive Player of the Week	
Week 3 (Sept 15)	N/A	N/A	N/A	Big 12 Offensive Line of the Week	
Week 6 (Oct 6)	Noah Fifita	QB	RJr.	Big 12 Offensive Player of the Week	
Week 10 (Nov 3)	Noah Fifita	QB	RJr.	Big 12 Offensive Player of the Week	
Week 11 (Nov 10)	Quincy Craig	RB	Graduate	Big 12 Offensive Player of the Week	
Week 13 (Nov 24)	Dalton Johnson	DB	Sr.	Big 12 Defensive Player of the Week	
Week 14 (Dec 1)	Dalton Johnson	DB	Sr.	Big 12 Defensive Player of the Week	

National Weekly Honors
Date	Player	Class	Position	Award

=== All-Big 12 ===
All-Big 12
Player	Position	1st/2nd/3rd team
Noah Fifita	QB	1st Team
Dalton Johnson	DB	1st Team
Treydan Stukes	DB	1st Team
Kris Hutson	WR	3rd Team
Taye Brown	LB	3rd Team
Jay'Vion Cole	DB	3rd Team
Genesis Smith	DB	3rd Team
Ty Buchanan	OL	HM
Jay'Vion Cole	Defensive Newcomer of the Year	HM
Noah Fifita	Offensive Player of the Year	HM
Dalton Johnson	Defensive Player of the Year	HM
Mays Pese	Defensive Freshman of the Year	HM
Ismail Mahdi	RB	HM
Deshawn McKnight	DL	HM
Tiaoalii Savea	DL	HM
Tre Spivey	WR	HM
Javin Whatley	WR	HM
HM = Honorable mention. Source:
