= Arizona Wildcats football =

University of Arizona football team

2026 Arizona Wildcats football team
- First season: 1899; 127 years ago
- Athletic director: Desiree Reed-Francois
- Head coach: Brent Brennan; 3rd season, 20–14 (.588)
- Location: Tucson, Arizona
- Stadium: Casino Del Sol Stadium (capacity: 50,782)
- NCAA division: Division I FBS
- Conference: Big 12
- Colors: Cardinal and navy
- All-time record: 652–508–33 (.560)
- Bowl record: 10–12–1 (.457)

Conference championships
- Border: 1935, 1936, 1941 WAC: 1964, 1973 Pac-12: 1993

Division championships
- Pac-12 South: 2014
- Consensus All-Americans: 16
- Rivalries: Arizona State (rivalry); New Mexico (rivalry)

Uniforms
- Fight song: Bear Down, Arizona
- Mascot: Wilbur and Wilma the Wildcat
- Marching band: The Pride of Arizona
- Outfitter: Nike
- Website: ArizonaWildcats.com

The Arizona Wildcats football program represents the University of Arizona (UA) in the sport of American college football. Arizona competes in the Football Bowl Subdivision (FBS) of the National Collegiate Athletic Association (NCAA) as a member of the Big 12 Conference. They play their home games at Casino Del Sol Stadium, which opened in 1929 on the university's campus in Tucson, Arizona, and has a capacity of 50,782. The Wildcats head coach is Brent Brennan.

Arizona's inaugural season was in 1899. The school first played as an independent before joining a conference in 1931, when they became a member of the now-defunct Border Conference. They, alongside rival Arizona State (ASU), would become part of the Western Athletic Conference (WAC) in 1962. In 1978, both Arizona and ASU joined the Pac-12 Conference (then known as the Pac-10). They were placed in the Pac-12 South Division when the conference realigned in 2011. Divisions within the Pac-12 were removed starting in the 2022 season, with the teams with the two best records in the conference making the conference title game.

Arizona joined the Big 12 in the 2024–2025 academic year on August 2, 2024, as part of a more extensive NCAA conference realignment.

The Wildcats have won at least a share of six conference championships, as well as a Pac-12 South division title in 2014, and made 21 bowl appearances, one of which are among the New Year's Six bowls.

== History ==
Arizona has had a long football history since it first played in 1899. Although the football program has been mostly playing in the shadow of the Wildcats' elite basketball program in terms of winning and recruiting which has been leading to many mediocre and losing seasons, it has, however, had successful winning seasons sporadically over the years, primarily during the early part of the 1990s when it had a dominant defense that was known to fans as the "Desert Swarm".

=== 1899–1950s (Early history) ===
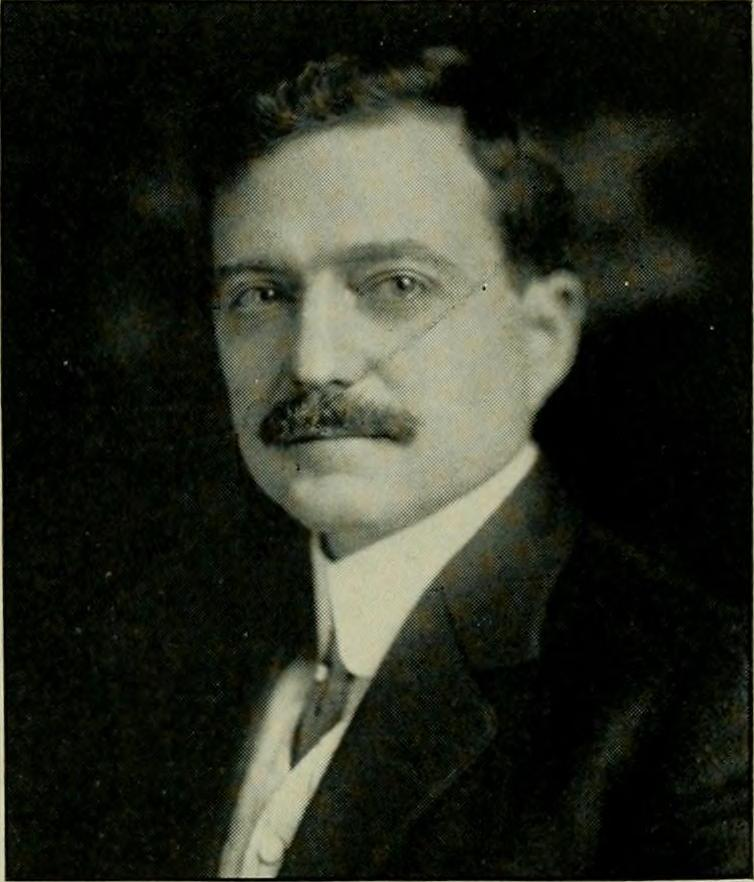
Coach Skinner

The varsity football program at the University of Arizona began in 1899, though the Wildcats nickname was not adopted until later. Stuart Forbes became the first head coach of Arizona football history and the team compiled a 1–1–1 record. From 1900 to 1901, William W. Skinner served as head football coach at the University of Arizona. While there, he also studied geology. He guided Arizona to 3–1 and 4–1 records, respectively. On November 7, 1914, the team traveled to the west coast to play Occidental, then one of the reigning gridiron powers in California. Occidental won 14–0. Arizona later received the name "Wildcats" after a Los Angeles Times correspondent, Bill Henry, wrote that "The Arizona men showed the fight of wildcats".

Pop McKale was a very successful high school coach in the Tucson area when he was hired at UA. In 1921, Drop-kicker/receiver Harold "Nosey" McClellan led the nation in scoring with 124 points. Wildcats finished the regular season 7–1, and were invited to UA's first bowl game, the East-West Christmas Classic in San Diego, to play powerhouse Centre College of Kentucky; Arizona lost the game 38–0. The Wildcats did not compete in football in 1918 due to World War I. On October 18, 1926, UA quarterback and student body president John "Button" Salmon died from injuries sustained in a car wreck. His final words, spoken to coach "Pop" McKale, were: "Tell them.....tell the team to Bear Down." Soon thereafter, the UA student body adopted "Bear Down" as the school's athletic motto.

On October 18, 1929, Arizona opened up Arizona Stadium for college football play. They won their first game against Caltech with a shutout score of 25–0. McKale retired after sixteen seasons at Arizona. The McKale Center, the Wildcats' home basketball venue, was opened in 1973 and named in McKale's honor. In 1931, Arizona joined the Border Conference and Fred Enke replaced McKale as coach and in one season as the head coach, he posted a record of 3–5–1 before getting demoted to assistant coach. Gus Farwick served as the head football coach at Arizona in 1932, compiling a record of 4–5 before his resignation. Tex Oliver coached the Arizona Wildcats to a 32–11–4 record in five seasons. During that stretch, his teams never had a losing season. Oliver's "Blue Brigade" played an expanded, more nationwide schedule, and Arizona produced their first All-Americans under Oliver. The team's 1938 record of 8–2 was a school best to date. Oliver resigned after the 1937 season to accept the head football coach position at Oregon. Orian Landreth replaced Oliver and struggled in his one season as head coach, compiling a 3–6 record before he was fired. That season was the first losing season for the Wildcats in several years.

Mike Casteel came to Arizona from his post as an assistant coach at Michigan State. In his eight seasons (Arizona did not field football teams in 1943 or 1944 due to World War II), Casteel compiled a 46–26–3 record and led the Wildcats to the first bowl berth in three decades in his final season, a loss in the 1949 Salad Bowl to Drake. Bob Winslow served as Arizona's head football coach for three seasons, posting a record of 12–18–1, with the team improving every year under his tutelage, going 2–7–1, 4–6 and 6–5 in Winslow's three years. Winslow resigned after three seasons.

In 1954, under coach Warren Woodson, who came to Arizona from Hardin–Simmons, the Wildcats were led by starting halfback Art Luppino. He went on to lead the nation in rushing, scoring, all-purpose running, and kickoff returns. Luppino became the first player in NCAA history to lead the nation in rushing twice. He also tied for the national title in all-purpose running and was third in scoring. Woodson was replaced after five seasons and a 26–22–2 record and was inducted into the College Football Hall of Fame as a coach in 1989. Ed Doherty came to Arizona from his post as an assistant coach for the NFL's Philadelphia Eagles. In two seasons, Doherty compiled a record of 4–15–1 before getting fired. Doherty is the only person to serve as head football coach at both Arizona and archrival Arizona State. Jim LaRue, formerly running backs coach at Houston, was hired to take over the program as head coach after Doherty's firing. LaRue's 1961 team finished 8–1–1 and finished the season ranked No. 17 in the final AP Poll.

=== 1960s–1977 (The WAC era) ===
In 1962, Arizona (and rival Arizona State) left the Border Conference and joined the Western Athletic Conference, and LaRue posted records of 5–5, 5–5, 6–3–1, 3–7 and 3–7 before being was fired due to poor results as well as pressure from fans and alumni.

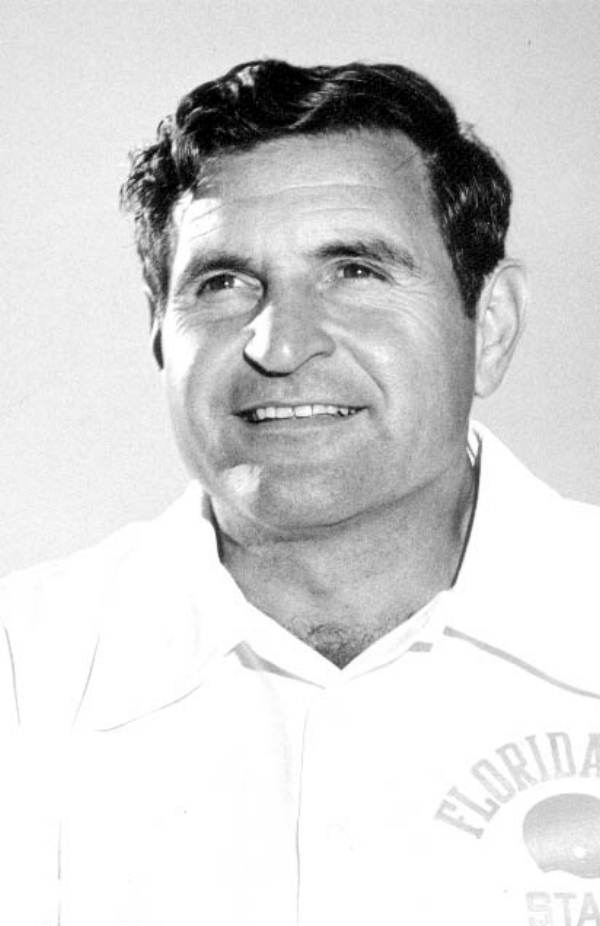
Coach Mudra

Darrell Mudra came to Arizona from North Dakota State in 1967 to lead the team after LaRue's dismissal. His first team posted a record of 3–6–1 but in his second year, Mudra's Wildcats posted a record of 8–3, capped with a loss to Auburn in the Sun Bowl, only the Wildcats third bowl appearance in school history and first since 1949. Mudra left Arizona after two seasons to accept the head football coach position at Western Illinois. His final record is 11–9–1. Mudra was inducted into the College Football Hall of Fame as a coach in 2000. In 1969, Bob Weber was promoted from offensive coordinator to head coach following Mudra's departure. Under Weber, the Wildcats were 16–26, with their best season being a 5–6 1971 season. Weber failed to post a winning season as Arizona's head coach and was fired after four seasons.

In 1973, Jim Young, formerly defensive coordinator at Michigan, was hired to turn around the downtrodden Wildcats football program. Improvement came immediately, as Young's team surprised the nation with an 8–3 record in his first season and shared the WAC title with Arizona State, Unfortunately, the Wildcats did not go to a bowl game due to losing the head-to-head rivalry game to ASU that season (at the time, only the outright conference winner earned a bowl since there were fewer bowl games available, unless a team from the same conference appears in a major bowl). Young's Wildcats went on to post records of 9–2 in 1974 and 1975, the latter ending with a No. 13 and No. 18 ranking in the Coaches and AP polls, respectively (like in 1973, both seasons ended in no bowl appearances for the Wildcats due to them finishing second in the WAC). In a rebuilding year, Young's team posted a 5–6 record in 1976 to cap Young's mark of 31–13 in four seasons. Young departed Arizona after the 1976 season to accept the head football coach position at Purdue. He was inducted into the College Football Hall of Fame as a coach in 1999.

By 1977, Arizona hired Tony Mason from Cincinnati to replace Young. Under Mason, the Wildcats went 5–7, 5–6 and 6–5–1 for a combined record of 16–18–1. The 1977 season was the last for Arizona as a member of the WAC.

=== 1978–1980s (The early Pac-10 years) ===
Before the 1978 season, both Arizona schools accepted an invitation to join the Pacific 8 Conference (which became the Pac-10). After a mediocre inaugural Pac-10 season, the Wildcats would rebound in 1979, and played in the Fiesta Bowl, ultimately losing to Pittsburgh. Mason was let go as head coach after the season due to an alleged slush fund scandal involving him and the program during his tenure.

Prior to the start of the 1980 season, Arizona hired Tulane coach Larry Smith, to replace Mason. His first season was Arizona's third in the Pac-10. Smith put great emphasis on in-state recruiting, built up the rivalry with ASU, and focused the team on what he called "running and hitting". His first team went 5–6, including a 44–7 blowout loss to ASU; it would be his only losing season at Arizona. The highlight of the season was a 23–17 upset of second-ranked UCLA (the Bruins were poised to become No. 1 as top ranked Alabama had lost earlier in the day). The team improved to 6–5 during his second season, highlighted by a major 13–10 upset of #1 USC on the road. It was Arizona's first victory over a top-ranked team in program history.

In 1982, the Wildcats improved and finished with a record of 6–4–1, which included upset victories over Notre Dame and rival ASU (with the latter being knocked out of the Rose Bowl as a result). However, Arizona was ineligible for a bowl game due to self-imposing a postseason ban prior to the start of the season as a result of the scandal under Mason's watch. The NCAA would eventually punish the Wildcats by placing them on probation and barred them from bowl eligibility in the 1983–84 seasons.

Despite the NCAA sanctions, Arizona continued to become competitive in the Pac-10 under Smith's leadership, and began to dominate Arizona State, and by 1985, their bowl ban was lifted. They played in the Sun Bowl, where a tie with Georgia gave the Wildcats an 8–3–1 record. In 1986, they defeated ASU yet again and defeated North Carolina in the Aloha Bowl for their very first bowl victory and finished with a 9–3. Seven Arizona players earned All-America honors during his tenure, including two-time consensus All-American linebacker Ricky Hunley and All-Americans linebacker Lamonte Hunley (Ricky's younger brother), Morris Trophy-winning center Joe Tofflemire, safety Allan Durden, placekicker Max Zendejas (who is known for kicking game-winning field goals against Arizona State in 1983 and 1985), linebacker Byron Evans, and safety Chuck Cecil (who is known for returning an interception for a touchdown in the win against ASU in 1986). Over twenty of Smith's Wildcats players went on to play professionally. Smith departed after the season to accept the head football coach position at conference foe USC. Smith ended has Arizona tenure with a 48–28–3 record. He died in 2008 and was voted as the second-best Wildcat football coach only behind his successor, Dick Tomey.

=== 1990s–2000 (Tomey and the "Desert Swarm") ===
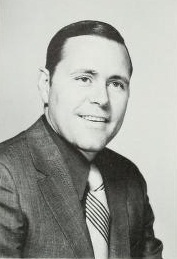
Coach Tomey circa 1973

In 1987, Tomey arrived in Arizona from Hawaii to replace Smith. During his 14-season tenure with Arizona, he coached five future NFL first-round draft choices, 20 All-Americans, and 43 Pac-10 first team players.

His best teams were in the 1990s, highlighted by a tenacious defense nicknamed the "Desert Swarm". He led Arizona to at least ten wins in 1993 and 1998 and resigned after the 2000 season.

In Tomey's first year, the Wildcats seemed to miss Smith's presence and had to rebuild, leading to a season where they had three ties, with one of them against Arizona State (the only tie in the rivalry's history). However, Arizona would improve from 1988 to 1990 as they started to win under Tomey, and won against North Carolina State in the Copper Bowl in 1989 (which was played at Arizona Stadium, the first time that the Wildcats played a bowl game on their home field). In 1990, the Wildcats would lose to Syracuse in the Aloha Bowl.

The Wildcats played a rebuilding season in 1991, which led to a poor record and losing to Arizona State for the first time since 1981. Arizona entered the 1992 season with Tomey on the hot seat due to the team's performance during the previous year. However, the so-called "Desert Swarm" defense began to dominate and was characterized by tough, hard-nosed tactics. Arizona led the nation in scoring defense and nose guard Rob Waldrop was a consensus All-American. The season included an upset victory over top-ranked Washington, which fans called the biggest Arizona win in the decade and the turning point for the program at the time. It was also Arizona's second win over a #1 team (with the first occurring against USC in 1981). To date, it remains the last time that Arizona defeated a top-ranked opponent. The Desert Swarm would ultimately lead Arizona to a winning record. However, Arizona's offense seemed to be overshadowed by the dominant performance by the "Swarm" and it led to them scoring fewer points, and lost to Baylor in the Sun Bowl (then known at the time as the John Hancock Bowl). The Wildcats ended the year with a 6–5–1 record, with the tie occurring early in the season at Oregon State, which would ultimately become the last ever for the Wildcats, as ties became abolished after the 1995 season. For the team's efforts, Tomey was awarded the Pac-10 coach of the year.

In 1993, the Swarm continued its dominance and it led to Arizona winning nine games in a season for the first time since 1975, and won a share of the Pac-10 title with UCLA and USC. However, the Wildcats split the two games against the two during the season, winning against the Trojans and losing to the Bruins, and it prevented Arizona from earning a trip to the Rose Bowl. The Wildcats would be invited to the 1994 Fiesta Bowl and the Desert Swarm led the way to a victory over Miami by a score of 29–0. It was the bowl game's first shutout in its history. Arizona ended the year with a 10–2 record, which was the first time in school history that the Wildcats won at least ten games or more in a season. The dominant Swarm, led by Waldrop and linebacker and future Super Bowl champion Tedy Bruschi, led the nation in total defense and rushing yards allowed. Waldrop would be named the Pac-10 defensive player of the year.

Arizona entered the 1994 season ranked sixth and were top contenders for the Rose Bowl and a possible national championship. Despite the continuation of the Desert Swarm's dominance, Arizona's offense, however was below-average at times and it led to Arizona dropping out of the Rose Bowl picture. The season ended with an 8–4 record and a loss to Utah in the Freedom Bowl.

After mediocre seasons from 1995 to 1996, despite Bruschi winning the 1995 Pac-10 defensive player of the year award, Arizona ended the 1997 season with a win over old rival New Mexico in the Insight Bowl in only their second bowl game played at home.

By 1998, Arizona's offense began to improve and started to dominate in the Pac-10, with fans nicknaming it the "Desert Storm" due to their performance and as a pun on the Desert Swarm name. It led the team to a near-perfect record of 11–1, with the Wildcats being defeated by UCLA midway through the season that denied an outright Pac-10 title and Rose Bowl berth. A major highlight occurred earlier in the season when Arizona scored a memorable touchdown in the closing seconds against Washington, which led to a road victory. They would play in the Holiday Bowl and defeated Nebraska to end the year with 12 wins, eclipsing the 1993 record. Arizona ended the season ranked fourth nationally in both the coaches and AP polls.

In 1999, the Wildcats were Rose Bowl and possible national title contenders. However, these chances would go down the drain after being humiliated by traditional powerhouse Penn State in the season opener and never recovered after that. The Wildcats heavily struggled on special teams by missing several field goals during most of the season, which led to a change in kickers. After a loss at Arizona State to conclude the season, Arizona finished with a 6–6 record missed the postseason, with the ASU loss ending any chance at a bowl game.

By the 2000 season, Arizona tried to improve on their 1999 record by getting off to a hot start. However, the Wildcats would collapse due to an inconsistent offense, defensive mistakes, and poor decision-making by Tomey, all of which would lead to a losing streak that included several close losses and ended the season with a loss to Arizona State to finish with a record of 5–6. It was the second season in a row that Arizona missed out on the postseason as a result of losing their rivalry game to ASU. Tomey resigned under pressure after the season and it was mostly due to the team's inability to accomplish their goal of making it to the Rose Bowl after several near-misses at it during his tenure, as well as Arizona's mediocrity after the successful 1998 seasons. He finished with a record of 95–64–4, with the 95 victories being the most by an Arizona coach. The Wildcats would decline in wins and went on a bowl game drought over the next several years, as well as consistently becoming overshadowed by Arizona's basketball team. Tomey would become rated as the best coach in Wildcat football history and he died in 2019, eleven years after his predecessor, Larry Smith.

=== 2000s (Decline and rebuild) ===
After the 2000 season, former Illinois and Texas head coach John Mackovic was hired to replace Tomey for the 2001 season. Mackovic was brought to Arizona in an attempt to restore the Wildcats to their winning ways and to take them to the Rose Bowl, something that Tomey was unable to do. Mackovic was a college football analyst at ESPN at the time of his hiring.

Mackovic's tenure became a disaster, as he alienated his players and failed to post a winning record in his two and a half seasons in Tucson. Also, he finished with a 10–18 record and never earned a bowl appearance. In his first season, which was affected by the 9/11 terrorist attacks, the Wildcats won their first three games but would struggle in Pac–10 play and narrowly missed a bowl game yet again with a 5–6 record despite a season-ending win over Arizona State, which would become the only high point of Mackovic's time at Arizona.

In 2002, Arizona got off to a promising start after winning three of their first four games before Mackovic became embroiled in controversy that affected the team. Midway through the season, Mackovic told one of his players that he was a disgrace to his family due to his poor performance on the field (the player would later be arrested possessing 87 pounds of marijuana). He also told another player to quit therapy or he would be kicked off the team. This and other incidents led 40 players (including future Pro Bowler Lance Briggs) to hold a secret meeting with school president Peter Likins. The players complained about Mackovic's constant verbal abuse, such as ugly tirades after losses. Mackovic offered a public apology to his players, the university, and fans. Arizona was unable to recover from the Mackovic scandals and finished with a 4–8 record. After the season ended, Arizona announced that Mackovic would return as coach for the 2003 season.

In 2003, however, whatever goodwill that he'd managed to restore quickly evaporated. Many players had lost their love for the game due to Mackovic's brusque manner and fans chanted "Fire Mackovic" during games. Five games into the season, Mackovic was fired and replaced on an interim basis by defensive coordinator Mike Hankwitz for the rest of the season. School officials said they had to act because it was obvious that the Wildcats would not win with Mackovic at the helm. Mackovic was known as the worst Arizona coach in history (his predecessor, Dick Tomey, was the best). Arizona also had poor recruiting during Mackovic's tenure that led to bad results, and were embarrassed by their opponents in most of their losses. The 2003 season was the worst in program history with a record of 2–10, with the ten losses being a school record at the time. Wildcat fans across Tucson and the state of Arizona had seen enough of Mackovic and shifted their attention to basketball after the season ended.

In 2004, Arizona hired Oklahoma defensive coordinator Mike Stoops, brother of famed Oklahoma head football coach Bob Stoops, to become the Wildcats' next coach. Stoops was hired to rebuild the team and to clean up the program's mess caused by Mackovic's troubles. Arizona began rebuilding and went 3–8 in Stoops' first two seasons, which included November upset victories over Arizona State in 2004 and UCLA in 2005. However, due to his record at the time, Stoops' job was in critical danger and his margin for error was very thin. In 2006, Stoops led the Wildcats to an improved 6–6 record, the first non-losing season for the school since 1999 when the Wildcats also went 6–6. The Wildcats upset California and became bowl-eligible. However, a rivalry loss to Arizona State and a losing conference record prevented them from earning a bowl bid.

Arizona entered the 2007 season with high expectations, but a sputtering offense early in the season and close losses put them at 2–6 and were in danger of missing yet another bowl and Stoops being placed on the hot seat. However, the Wildcats would rebound and go on a winning streak, which included an upset win over then-#2 Oregon. It was the fourth consecutive season that Arizona upset a ranked team at home in the month of November. Unfortunately, the Wildcats would lose to ASU in the season finale yet again with a 5–7 record and missing out on a bowl once more, drawing similarities to the 1999 and 2000 seasons when rivalry losses denied Arizona of bowl bid in both years.

By 2008, the Wildcats told Stoops that he needed to make a bowl game or he would lose his job. However, Arizona improved and became bowl-eligible by defeating ASU for the first time since 2004, which saved Stoops' job. With a 7–5 record, Arizona was invited to a bowl game for the first time since 1998 when Tomey was still the coach, and erased most of the memories of the Mackovic era. The Wildcats ultimately defeated BYU in the Las Vegas Bowl by a score of 31–21.

In 2009, Arizona finished 8–5 for the second straight season. However, the Wildcats would be embarrassed by Nebraska in the Holiday Bowl, which was a rematch of the 1998 meeting. After the season ended, offensive coordinator Sonny Dykes left the Wildcats to become the head coach at Louisiana Tech (Dykes is currently the coach at TCU). and defensive coordinator Mark Stoops, brother of both Mike and Bob, became the defensive coordinator at Florida State (he is now the head coach at Kentucky). To replace them, Stoops promoted Bill Bedenbaugh and Seth Littrell to co-offensive coordinators, while promoting Tim Kish to be co-defensive coordinators with Greg Brown, who was hired from Colorado.

=== 2010s (The Pac-12 era) ===
Arizona began the 2010 season with a possible shot at a Rose Bowl berth. However, despite having a record of 7–1 entering November, they would collapse and went on a losing streak due to poor performances on the field, including a heartbreaking overtime loss to Arizona State in the finale. They ultimately lost to Oklahoma State in the Alamo Bowl by a score of 37–10, and ending the year with a 7–6 record.

Before the 2011 season began, the Pac-10 was renamed the Pac-12 after Utah and Colorado joined membership. The Wildcats began the year hoping to rebound and Stoops coaching for his job, as he entered the season on the hot seat. After starting off with a win against in-state foe Northern Arizona in the opener, Arizona would lose in blowouts to a series of ranked teams (including a rematch with Oklahoma State) and fans became incensed by the team's poor performance and began calling for Stoops to be fired. In early October, the Wildcats would continue to lose and Stoops was fired for good, and finished with a 41–50 record in his seven and a half seasons as Arizona coach. Arizona said that Stoops' firing was a result of "the inability to win more games, below-average recruiting, and being unable to achieve the team's goal to make a Rose Bowl appearance", as well as Stoops' frequently misbehavior towards officials on the sidelines (which was often seen during TV broadcasts of Arizona games). Kish, the team's defensive coordinator, was named interim head coach for the remainder of the season. (Stoops returned to the Sooner program soon thereafter as defensive coordinator; Kish, who had known the Stoops brothers for many years, followed Stoops and joined the Sooner staff as the linebackers coach.) Under Kish, the Wildcats partially rebounded and won three of the final six games to finish with a 4–8 record. The later years of the Stoops era featured quarterback Nick Foles breaking Arizona records, including the single-season and career records for most passing yards and touchdowns. Foles would later win a Super Bowl in 2017 for the Eagles.

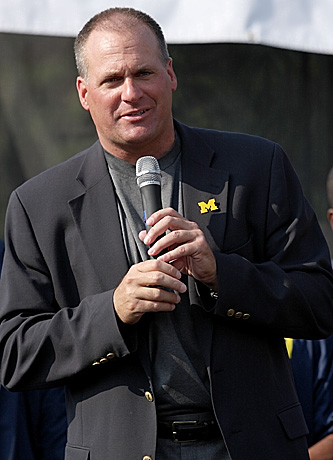
Coach Rich Rodriguez

After the conclusion of the 2011 season, Arizona hired Rich Rodriguez, former coach at Michigan and West Virginia, to become the Wildcats' new coach for the 2012 season. Rodriguez is considered a pioneer of a no huddle, run-oriented version of the spread offense, although a pass-first version was already being implemented by others. Rodriguez hired Jeff Casteel, who served under him during his tenure at West Virginia, as the new defensive coordinator for Arizona. Casteel is considered one of the top defensive coaches in the nation, and considered master of the 3–3–5 "odd stack" defense.

In his first two seasons, Rodriguez took the Wildcats to 8–5 records, both of which ended in bowl victories, defeating Nevada in the New Mexico Bowl in 2012 after a wild comeback, and winning the Independence Bowl over Boston College in 2013. Major highlights of the 2012–13 seasons were big upset victories over ranked opponents, with Arizona defeating both Oklahoma State (which avenged the Wildcats' losses to them in the previous two seasons) and USC in the former year and Oregon in the latter. Also, in both seasons, the performance of running back Ka'Deem Carey led the Wildcat offense, and set Arizona records for rushing yards and touchdowns scored.

In 2014, the Wildcats completed a 10–2 regular season, only the third time in Arizona history that they won ten games in a season and the first since 1998. The solid performance, led by quarterback Anu Solomon, linebacker Scooby Wright III (who earned Pac-12 Defensive Player of the Year among other honors), and running backs Terris Jones-Grigsby and Nick Wilson, led the Wildcats to the Pac-12 South Division title, which was the first divisional championship in program history, and advanced to the conference title game at Levi's Stadium in Santa Clara, California, where they were dominated by Oregon, 51–13, and led to Oregon clinching a spot in both the Rose Bowl and the inaugural College Football Playoff (Arizona had upset the Ducks earlier in the season for the second year in a row). The Wildcats earned a berth in the Fiesta Bowl, the school's third major-bowl appearance, where they fell to Boise State. It was Arizona's first appearance in a Fiesta Bowl since the 1993 season. They finished the season ranked 17th in the USA Today Coaches Poll and 19th in the AP poll. In addition to the upset of Oregon, highlights of the regular season included a comeback win over California on a Hail Mary touchdown pass on the final play, a win over Washington on a last-second field goal, and outlasting Arizona State for the division championship. In addition, Rodriguez was named the Pac-12 coach of the year, becoming the second Arizona coach to win the award (Dick Tomey won it in 1992).

In 2015, with most of their roster returning, Arizona started off as Pac-12 title contenders. However, they faltered during the second half of the season but still managed to earn a bowl bid. They finished with a record of 7–6 and defeated New Mexico in the New Mexico Bowl, which was played on New Mexico's campus in Albuquerque, similar to the Wildcats playing the Lobos in the Insight Bowl in 1997 that was played in Tucson. Arizona did manage to pull off an overtime win against then-#10 Utah in the regular season in yet another November upset victory, mirroring the accomplishments that occurred during the early Stoops era.

After an injury-plagued 2016 season that kept them out of a bowl, the Wildcats recovered in 2017, becoming bowl-eligible with seven wins before falling short against Purdue in the Foster Farms Bowl. The Wildcats finished with a record of 7–6. After a 2–2 start to the season, Arizona turned things around under the performance of dual-threat option quarterback Khalil Tate, which became especially impressive. In an early October game against Colorado, Tate proceeded to run for 327 yards, an NCAA single-game record for quarterbacks, breaking the previous record of 316 set by Northern Illinois' Jordan Lynch in 2013. Arizona went on to win the game, 45–42. Tate was awarded the Pac-12 offensive player of the week and would lead the Wildcats on a winning streak. In addition, Tate was named Pac-12 offensive player of the week for four consecutive weeks – setting a conference record, and leading to him briefly being spoken of as a candidate for the Heisman Trophy. However, Arizona's defense would let the team down in November, and led to them losing their bowl game. Also, the Wildcats' late-season collapse may have likely cost Tate the Pac-12 offensive player of the year award.

Rodriguez was dismissed as head coach on January 2, 2018, in the wake of an internal university investigation of sexual harassment claims made by Rodriguez' former administrative assistant. Other factors in Rodriguez being fired was the lack of winning enough games that mattered as well as not bringing in elite recruiting classes to the program. Arizona was forced to find a new coach to rebuild the program.

To replace Rodriguez, Arizona hired Kevin Sumlin to take over the team. Sumlin was previously head coach at Texas A&M University and Houston. Sumlin also became the first black football coach to lead the Wildcats.

In his first season in 2018, Sumlin took the offense into a different direction by instituting a new scheme (a pro-style offense as opposed to Rodriguez's spread), which led to Tate being unable to repeat his 2017 performance. After a poor start, the Wildcats would find their rhythm and started to win again. A low point of the season occurred in the finale in the rivalry game against Arizona State. With a potential chance at bowl-eligibility at stake, the Wildcats entered the final quarter thinking the game was over with a large lead, which led to a collapse and ultimately losing to end with a 5–7 record. In 2019, with Tate returning, Arizona started 4–1 early in the season but played poorly on both offense and defense and finished the year on a seven-game losing streak that included another rivalry loss to ASU for a 4–8 record.

=== 2020s–present (Future and Big 12 era) ===
In 2020, the COVID-19 pandemic put an effect on the Wildcats as well as the entire college football season. Prior to the start of the year, Arizona announced that Sumlin would return as coach after fans called for him to be fired late in the previous season due to team's underperformance. It followed an offseason of poor recruiting and players taking COVID-19 opt-outs. The year began with Sumlin being placed on the hot seat, meaning that he needed to take the team to the postseason in order for him to keep his job. The COVID-19 outbreak would cause several cancellations of games and leading schedules to be shortened and truncated, and playing only conference games for each team, including the Pac-12.

Arizona, unfortunately, continued to lose by being affected by the pandemic, as well as poor coaching and no fans at their games, and was destroyed by Arizona State by a 70–7 score in the finale. Sumlin was fired after the conclusion of the season, with Arizona citing wins and losses and Sumlin finishing with a 0–3 record against ASU. Fans expressed disapproval with Sumlin's leadership, including lack of winning, poor coaching decisions, weak recruiting, and an overall decline in the reputation of the program, all of which were major factors for Sumlin's firing, though Arizona said that Sumlin not meeting expectations was the main reason for his dismissal.

Soon after Sumlin was fired, Arizona conducted a national coaching search. Former college and NFL coach Jedd Fisch was chosen as the Wildcats' next head football coach, as announced on December 23, 2020. Fisch and San Jose State coach Brent Brennan (a former assistant under Wildcat coach Dick Tomey in his final year in Tucson, as well for a few seasons at San Jose State) were the two finalists for the opening. Fisch has previous ties to Arizona president Dr. Robert Robbins, and has extensive NFL assistant coaching experience (for five different franchises) and was previously a collegiate assistant at UCLA, Minnesota, and Miami.

In Fisch's first season in 2021, he began to clean up the mess left behind by Sumlin and the Wildcats played an average defense that kept them in most of their games. However, injuries and inexperience on the offense led to scoring fewer points and would cost them a chance at wins. After an 0–8 start which included an upset loss to Northern Arizona earlier in the season (Arizona had not lost to NAU since 1932 before then), Fisch would finally earn his first victory as Arizona coach when the Wildcats defeated California in early November, with several players and coaches for the Golden Bears were out because of COVID-19. It turned out to Arizona's only win of the season, as they finished with a 1–11 record, including a loss to Arizona State for the fifth straight year. The eleven losses are the most in a single season for Arizona, surpassing the record of ten set by the 2003 team.

In 2022, Fisch would capitalize on recruiting and player transfers to turn around the program. The Wildcats rebuilt their offense and took down Division I (FCS) powerhouse North Dakota State and upset UCLA despite a poor defense. Arizona would conclude the season on a high note by defeating ASU to end their futility against their rival. They would finish the year with a 5–7 record, which was a four-game improvement from the previous season.

The Wildcats began the 2023 season hoping to get to a bowl game as they would continue to rebuild and improve. With a fixed defense and a dynamic offense led by a change at quarterback (with Noah Fifita taking over for an injured Jayden de Laura), Fisch began to take the team on a winning run. Fifita threw often to his former high school teammate Tetairoa McMillan as well as wide receiver Jacob Cowing and tight end Tanner McLachlan as top targets. Running backs Michael Wiley and Jonah Coleman were also standout offensive performers.

From mid-October to early November of the season, Arizona would compete a rare accomplishment by defeating three straight ranked teams, all Pac-12 opponents (Washington State, Oregon State, and UCLA), and winning six straight games overall to end the regular season, their longest winning streak since 1998, all which led to them becoming bowl-eligible for the first time since 2017. The Wildcats would join the rankings and by the end of November, they would be ranked 14th in the AP top 25 poll (their highest since 2014) After winning big against Utah and rival Arizona State (which was their first rivalry win on the road since 2011), they were invited to play in the Alamo Bowl against Oklahoma, who along with Texas, would end up leaving the Big 12 for the SEC after the season. (ironically, Arizona's last appearance in the Alamo Bowl was an embarrassing loss to Oklahoma's rival Oklahoma State in 2010). The Wildcats defeated the Sooners in a comeback victory and Arizona finished with their fourth ten-win season in program history and the first since 2014. In January 2024, Fisch announced he would be leaving Arizona to become the next head coach of Washington, filling the vacancy created by previous coach Kalen DeBoer joining the Alabama Crimson Tide. It is believed that financial issues within Arizona's athletic department and being offered more money by Washington as they (along with Pac-12 members, USC, UCLA, and Oregon) were leaving to join the more traditional Big Ten Conference as well as going into a new direction were the main factors of Fisch leaving Arizona and forcing the Wildcats to find a successor.

On January 16, 2024, San Jose State head coach Brent Brennan, a coach with strong ties to the late Wildcat head coach Dick Tomey as noted above, was announced as Fisch's successor (Brennan's brother, Brad, was a tight end that played under Tomey and was part of Arizona's memorable 1998 team). Brennan hired Dino Babers, recently fired as the head coach at Syracuse, as offensive coordinator, and veteran assistant coach Duane Akina as defensive coordinator; both also have extensive ties to Tomey and the Wildcat program (Babers was the Wildcats' offensive coordinator in Tomey's final years from 1998 to 2000, and Akina was a top Arizona assistant from 1987 through 2000, returning as a defensive analyst for the 2023 season, and was the offensive coordinator under Tomey in the early 1990s during the "Desert Swarm" era). Fifita and McMillan announced not long after Brennan's arrival that they were remaining at Arizona under the new coaching staff.

Prior to the 2024 season, Arizona, along with Arizona State, Utah, and Colorado, joined the Big 12 Conference. The Wildcats started off 2024 with a win over old rival New Mexico that gave Brennan his first win as Arizona coach. In late September, Arizona won their first Big 12 game by upsetting Utah (ranked tenth) on the road. However, as the season progressed, the Wildcats would suffer from a combination of player injuries and facing more talented Big 12 opponents, which led to them underperforming on the field and being a below-average team, and finished with a losing record and missing a bowl game. After the season, both coordinators were fired, with Babers due to a sputtering offense that did not score enough points and Akina due to the defense giving up too many yards in most of the games during the season, and that Brennan was forced to find replacements to fix the program's issues on the field.

To navigate the program through a $240 million athletic department deficit and its inaugural transition into the Big 12 Conference, school president Robert C. Robbins hired Missouri athletic director Desireé Reed-Francois in February 2024. Formally assuming the post in March 2024 as the R. Ken Coit Director of Athletics under a contract extended through March 2032, Reed-Francois, a 1997 alumna of the University of Arizona College of Law, became the first female athletic director in school history.

Ahead of the 2025 season, Brennan replaced nearly half of his original coaching staff, hiring new coordinators to overhaul both sides of the ball.

In December 2024, Brennan hired Seth Doege as offensive coordinator. A former standout quarterback at Texas Tech who played professionally in the NFL and CFL, Doege brought experience as an assistant under Clay Helton at USC and Lane Kiffin at Ole Miss, as well as a successful season in 2024 running Marshall's high-powered offense. For the defense, Brennan promoted Danny Gonzales to defensive coordinator in January 2025. Gonzales, who joined Arizona in 2024 as special teams coordinator and linebackers coach, possessed extensive leadership experience, having previously served as the head coach at New Mexico (2020–2023) and defensive coordinator at rival Arizona State (2018–2019).

The staff changes yielded immediate results. Arizona rebounded from its inaugural Big 12 struggles by posting a 9–3 regular season record (6–3 in Big 12 play), highlighted by ranked wins over Kansas State and Colorado, and a 23–7 victory over ASU in the Territorial Cup. The Wildcats earned an invitation to the Holiday Bowl, falling 24–19 to SMU to wrap up a 9–4 campaign.

With leadership stabilized under Reed-Francois and Brennan’s staff in place, Arizona carried momentum into the 2026 season, jumping out to a 7–2 record and a #22 national ranking through its first nine games, which was the best start since the 2014 season when they won the Pac-12 South Division title. Additionally, Noah Fifita surpassed Nick Foles to become the school's all-time leading passer. Arizona hosted Big Noon Kickoff against Utah in Tucson on November 14, which was the school's first time hosting the program.

== Conference affiliations ==
- Independent (1899–1930)
- Border Conference (1931–1961)
- Western Athletic Conference (1962–1977)
- Pac-12 Conference (1978–2023)
  - Pacific-10 Conference (1978–2010)
  - Pac-12 Conference (2011–2023)
- Big 12 Conference (2024–present)

== Head coaches ==
The following are the head coaches of the Arizona Wildcats.

No.	Season	Names	Record	Pct
1	1899	Stuart Forbes	1–1–1	.500
2	1900–1901	William W. Skinner	7–2	.778
3	1902	Leslie Gillette	5–0	1.000
4	1903–1904	Orin A. Kates	5–1–2	.667
5	1905	William M. Ruthrauff	5–2	.714
6	1908–1909	H. B. Galbraith	8–1	.889
7	1910–1911	Frank Shipp	8–1–1	.850
8	1912	Raymond L. Quigley	2–1	.667
9	1913	Frank A. King	2–2	.500
10	1914–1930	Pop McKale	80–32–6	.703
11	1931	Fred Enke	3–5–1	.389
12	1932	August W. Farwick	4–5	.444
13	1933–1937	Tex Oliver	32–11–4	.723
14	1938	Orian Landreth	3–6	.333
15	1939–1948	Mike Casteel	46–26–3	.633
16	1949–1951	Bob Winslow	12–18–1	.403
17	1952–1956	Warren B. Woodson	26–22–2	.540
18	1957–1958	Ed Doherty	4–15–1	.225
19	1959–1966	Jim LaRue	41–37–2	.525
20	1967–1968	Darrell Mudra	11–9–1	.548
21	1969–1972	Bob Weber	16–26	.381
22	1973–1976	Jim Young	31–13	.705
23	1977–1979	Tony Mason	16–18–1	.471
24	1980–1986	Larry Smith	48–28–3	.627
25	1987–2000	Dick Tomey	95–64–4	.595
26	2001–2003	John Mackovic	10–18	.357
27 (Int.)	2003	Mike Hankwitz (interim)	1–6	.143
28	2004–2011	Mike Stoops	41–50	.451
29 (Int.)	2011	Tim Kish (interim)	3–3	.500
30	2012–2017	Rich Rodriguez	43–35	.551
31	2018–2020	Kevin Sumlin	9–20	.310
32	2021–2023	Jedd Fisch	16–21	.432
33	2024–present	Brent Brennan	20–14	.588

== Championships ==
=== Conference championships ===
Arizona has claimed at least a share of six conference titles.

Season	Conference	Coach	Conference Record	Overall Record
1935	Border Conference	Tex Oliver	4–0	7–2
1936	Border Conference	Tex Oliver	3–0–1	5–2–3
1941†	Border Conference	Miles W. Casteel	5–0	7–3
1964†	Western Athletic Conference	Jim LaRue	3–1	6–3–1
1973†	Western Athletic Conference	Jim Young	6–1	8–3
1993†	Pacific-10 Conference	Dick Tomey	6–2	10–2

† Co-champions

=== Division championships ===
The Wildcats claimed the South Division title of the Pac-12 in 2014.

Season	Division	Coach	Conf Record	Overall Record	Opponent	Pac-12 CG Result
2014	Pac-12 South	Rich Rodriguez	7–2	10–2	Oregon	L 13–51

== Bowl games ==
Arizona has appeared in 23 bowl games, posting an overall record of 10–12–1. The team's most recent appearance in a bowl game was a loss to SMU at the 2026 Holiday Bowl (January).

The team's first official bowl game was the 1968 Sun Bowl, under coach Darrell Mudra. The Wildcats lost to the Auburn Tigers 34–10 in that contest. The team's next bowl game was the 1979 Fiesta Bowl, losing to Pittsburgh. After tying Georgia in the 1985 Sun Bowl, Arizona finally earned their first bowl win when they defeated North Carolina in the 1986 Aloha Bowl.

Arizona has been invited six times to one of the "New Year's Six" major bowl games (the Rose, Sugar, Fiesta, Orange, Cotton, and Peach Bowls), including two appearances in CFP in 2014 and Bowl Coalition game in 1993, both of which were Fiesta Bowls.

Not included in this tally of bowl games is Arizona's first "post-season" game, played in 1921 against the Centre Colonels during the San Diego East-West Christmas Classic. Arizona lost that game 38–0. Also not included was the 1949 Salad Bowl, against the Drake Bulldogs, Arizona lost 14–13.

Bowl game	No. of appearances	First year	Last year	Bowl record
Sun Bowl	3	1968	1992	0–2–1
Fiesta Bowl	3	1979	2014	1–2
Alamo Bowl	2	2010	2023	1–1
Cactus Bowl	2	1989	1997	2–0
Holiday Bowl	3	1998	2025	1–2
New Mexico Bowl	2	2012	2015	2–0
Aloha Bowl	2	1986	1990	1–1
Independence Bowl	1	2013	2013	1–0
Las Vegas Bowl	1	2008	2008	1–0
Foster Farms Bowl	1	2017	2017	0–1
Freedom Bowl	1	1994	1994	0–1

== All-time series records ==
Arizona's season records are from the record books of the university's athletic association. Through November 15, 2026, Arizona has compiled an overall record of 650 wins, 513 losses, and 33 ties (including post-season bowl games).

=== All-time record against Big 12 opponents ===
Opponent	W-L-T (Percentage)	Streak (W/L)	First Year	Last Year	Next Year
Arizona State	52–45–1 (.536)	W1	1899	2025	2026
Baylor	1–1–0 (.500)	W1	1992	2025	2027
BYU	12–14–1 (.481)	L5	1936	2026	2027
Colorado	11–17–0 (.393)	W1	1931	2025	2027
Cincinnati	2–0–0 (1.000)	W2	2025	2026	TBD
Houston	2–3–0 (.400)	W1	1969	2024	2027
Iowa State	5–2–1 (.688)	W1	1948	2025	TBD
Kansas	2–3–1 (.417)	L1	1937	1966	2027
Kansas State	6–2–1 (.722)	W1	1947	2025	2026
Oklahoma State	5–5–0 (.500)	W2	1931	2025	2027
TCU	2–2–0 (.500)	W1	1999	2026	TBD
Texas Tech	5–28–2 (.171)	L2	1932	2026	TBD
UCF	0–1–0 (.000)	L1	2024	2024	2027
Utah	21–26–2 (.449)	L1	1924	2026	2027
West Virginia	1–1–0 (.500)	W1	2024	2026	TBD
Totals	107–150–9(.419)				

=== All-time record against in-state opponents ===
Arizona's athletic program operated with a limited budget for the first several years after its establishment in 1899. To reduce travel costs, early Arizona football teams played limited slates of games, mostly against squads from nearby schools. Local scheduling resulted in the development of gridiron rivalries with several in-state private colleges, most notably Arizona State and Northern Arizona.

Opponent	W-L-T (Percentage)	Streak (W/L)	First Year	Last Year	Next Year
Arizona State	52–45–1 (.536)	W1	1899	2025	2026
Northern Arizona	18–2–0 .900	W3	1932	2026	2027
Totals	70–47–1(.597)				

All records accurate as of the conclusion of 2026 Season.

== Rivalries ==
=== Arizona State ===
The primary rival of the Wildcats is Arizona State. Both teams are members of the Big 12. The annual matchup the two schools is known as the "Duel in the Desert". The winner receives the Territorial Cup trophy. Originating in 1899, the Wildcats lost the first game by a score of 11–2. Arizona leads the series at 52–45–1 through the end of the 2025 season. Arizona currently has a one-game winning streak against Arizona State.

=== New Mexico ===
For most of its history, Arizona has had a secondary rival, the New Mexico Lobos. The series was intense until the annual matchup was cancelled after Arizona joined the Pac-10 in 1978 and the two schools have met sporadically since then. They have met twice in bowl games, with Arizona winning both, as they won the 1997 Insight.com Bowl and the 2015 New Mexico Bowl. Arizona leads the head-to-head series at 45–20–3 and won the most recent game played in 2024. Both teams are considering a revival of an annual matchup in the near future.

== Records ==
=== Career Records ===
Statistic	Player	Season	Total
Passing yards	Noah Fifita	2022–26	12,333
Passing touchdowns	Noah Fifita	2022–26	97
Rushing yards	Ka'Deem Carey	2011–13	4,239
Rushing touchdowns	Ka'Deem Carey	2011–13	48
Receptions	Mike Thomas	2005–08	259
Receiving yards	Tetairoa McMillan	2022–24	3,423
Receiving touchdowns	Juron Criner	2008–11	32
Total tackles	Ricky Hunley	1980–83	566
Sacks	Tedy Bruschi	1992–95	55
Interceptions	Chuck Cecil	1984–87	21
Scoring	Max Zendejas	1982–85	360

=== Single Season Records ===
Statistic	Player	Season	Total
Passing yards	Nick Foles	2011	4,334
Passing touchdowns	Noah Fifita	2025	29
Rushing yards	Ka'Deem Carey	2012	1,929
Rushing touchdowns	Ka'Deem Carey	2012	23
Receptions	Bobby Wade	2002	93
Receiving yards	Dennis Northcutt	1999	1,422
Receiving touchdowns	Jacob Cowing	2023	13
Total tackles	Mark Jacobs	1974	200
Sacks	Tedy Bruschi	1995	14.5
Interceptions	Jackie Wallace	1971	11
Scoring	Art Luppino	1954	166

=== Single Game Records ===
Statistic	Player	Season	Total
Passing yards	Noah Fifita	2023	527
Passing touchdowns	Jayden de Laura; Tom Tunnicliffe	2022; 1982	6
Rushing yards	Ka'Deem Carey	2012	366
Rushing touchdowns	Ka'Deem Carey	2012	5
Receptions	Jeremy McDaniel	1996	14
Receiving yards	Tetairoa McMillan	2024	304
Receiving touchdowns	Jacob Cowing; Tetairoa McMillan	2023; 2024	4
Interceptions	Chuck Cecil	1987	4
Scoring	Art Luppino	1954	32

== Home stadium and facilities ==
=== Casino Del Sol Stadium ===
Arizona plays its home games at Casino Del Sol Stadium, which located on the campus in Tucson. The stadium capacity is 50,782 as of 2026.

=== Lowell-Stevens Football Facility ===
Located on the north end of Casino Del Sol Stadium, the 187,000 square foot facility houses the football programs weight room, locker room, medical treatment room, players lounge, cafeteria, coaches' offices, auditorium for team meetings, as well as a media room. The facility also offers 4,200 chair seating, as well as 500 premium seating.

== Traditions ==
The Wildcats have had several traditions during its history for home games, including tailgating on game days and meeting and greeting players when they get off the team bus before entering the stadium. Also, before kickoff, fireworks go off over the stadium as the players enter the field and fans cheering. In addition, the fans and Arizona's student section often chant "U of A" between quarters and the school's marching band performing "Bear Down" after victories.

== Logos and uniforms ==
Arizona has a history of logos and uniforms for its football program. They have traditionally worn white helmets, blue jerseys, and white pants for home games. During the early to mid-1970s, they donned white helmets with a "UA" logo. From 1977 to 1980, Arizona wore red helmets with a blue "A" and red jerseys. From 1981 to 1989, they wore white helmets with a red "A" and wore blue jerseys. During the 1982 season, the Wildcats wore their road white jerseys for several home games due to winning big on the road that year, including the rivalry game against ASU (an NCAA rule change on uniform colors in 1983 forced Arizona to wear their blue jerseys at home full-time. In 1990, Arizona debuted new white helmets that featured the school's current "A" logo (the "A" was actually created in 1987, though it appeared on Arizona Stadium's midfield in 1989). The helmets would be in use until the end of the 2003 season. The Wildcats wore blue pants for road games during the 1992 season and was worn for all road games until 2000, with the white pants limited to only home games (the blue pants were worn at home for the first time in 2002).

In 2004, Arizona debuted blue helmets and retired their longtime white ones (the helmets were used for all games through the end of the 2009 season until they brought back the white helmets for their 2009 bowl game). They brought back red jerseys in 2005 and debuted red pants in 2008. Starting in the 2010 season, Arizona wore new uniforms. They are simplified versions of the uniforms worn from 2005 to 2009, with the addition of a white helmet with a red-white-blue stripe (which was featured on their white helmet from 1981 to 2003). The team used any combination of its two helmets, three jerseys and three pants. On September 29, 2012, the Wildcats unveiled a new copper helmet for their game against Oregon State and for the Territorial Cup game later that season, they unveiled a red helmet. For their home game against California in 2014, Arizona wore white jerseys at home for the first time since 1982 (as a result of the Wildcats doing a "white out"). On September 20, 2015, the Wildcats unveiled a new "chrome red" helmet which they wore against UCLA (they would wear the same helmets in 2016 against Arizona State).

On August 4, 2021, Arizona announced it would be going back to an updated version of their "Desert Swarm" uniforms worn during the Tomey era. They wore their white jerseys and blue pants for their first two home games of the 2021 season, supposedly due to the extreme Arizona heat during the time. It was the first time since 1982 that the Wildcats wore white jerseys at home. In 2023, Arizona debuted a red version of their Desert Swarm uniforms.

On August 31, 2024, in their home opener against New Mexico, Arizona was forced to wear their white jerseys due to a uniform issue involving New Mexico, leading to a "white out". It was also determined that Arizona wore white due to the heat (the Wildcats were originally going to wear their blue jerseys for the game). On September 13, for their game at Kansas State, the Wildcats wore red helmets with a scripted "Cats" logo on them. In October, Arizona would again debut new helmets, as they donned white helmets that featured the "A" logo against a background of the American flag in the shape of the state of Arizona, in which the Wildcats used for a military promotion on October 5 for their first Big 12 home game against Texas Tech. On October 19 in their homecoming game against Colorado, they wore white helmets that featured a logo of "Arizona" against a desert background of a cactus and mountains, which was formerly used on Arizona's basketball team's court from 1987 to 2009.

On September 12, 2025, in their game against Kansas State, Arizona wore their 1980s helmets (which featured the 1981–89 red "A" logo that was used during most of the Smith years and the early part of the Tomey era). On October 4, the Wildcats wore special uniforms (white jerseys and pants with a slightly tanned color in it and red numbers on the jerseys) and the red retro cactus helmets which they debuted the season before.

== Individual accomplishments ==
=== National winners ===
Defensive honors
- Lombardi Award
  Best defensive player

Scooby Wright III – 2014

- Nagurski Trophy
  Top defensive player

Scooby Wright – 2014

- Outland Trophy
  Top interior lineman

Rob Waldrop – 1993

- Jack Lambert Trophy
  Top linebacker

Scooby Wright – 2014

- Jim Thorpe Award
  Top defensive back

Darryll Lewis – 1990
Antoine Cason – 2007

Special teams

- Lou Groza Award
  Best kicker

Steve McLaughlin – 1994

- Mosi Tatupu Award

Chris McAlister – 1998

=== Retired jerseys ===
Student-Athlete jerseys are retired but not individual player numbers.

Arizona Wildcats retired jersey numbers
No.	Player	Pos.	Tenure
4	Darryll Lewis	CB	1987–1989
5	Antoine Cason	CB	2004–2007
6	Chuck Cecil	S	1985–1987
11	Chris McAlister	CB	1996–1998
22	Art Luppino	TB	1953–1956
28	Steve McLaughlin	K	1991–1995
68	Tedy Bruschi	DE	1991–1995
89	Ricky Hunley	LB	1980–1983
92	Rob Waldrop	DT	1990–1993

=== Conference awards ===
- Pac-12 Offensive Player of the Year

Ka'Deem Carey – 2013

- Pac-12 Offensive Freshman of the Year

Mike Thomas – 2005
J. J. Taylor – 2017

- Pac-12 Defensive Player of the Year

Ricky Hunley – 1983
Byron Evans – 1986
Chuck Cecil – 1987
Dana Wells – 1988
Darryll Lewis – 1990
Rob Waldrop – 1993
Tedy Bruschi – 1995
Scooby Wright – 2014

- Pac-12 Defensive Freshman of the Year

Colin Schooler – 2017

- Pac-12 Coach of the Year

Dick Tomey – 1992
Rich Rodriguez – 2014

- Morris Trophy

Dana Wells – 1987, 1988 (defense)
Joe Tofflemire – 1988 (offense)
Rob Waldrop – 1992 (defense)
Tedy Bruschi – 1995 (defense)
Yusuf Scott – 1998 (offense)

=== Heisman voting ===
Arizona has had two players finish in the top 10 of the Heisman Trophy voting as of 2024.

Year	Name	Pos	Finish	Ref.
2013	Ka'Deem Carey	RB	10th	
2014	Scooby Wright III	LB	9th	

=== All-Americans ===
==== Canadian Football Hall of Fame ====
There are two former Wildcat players inducted into the Canadian Football Hall of Fame.

Player	Pos.	Years	CFL Team(s)	Inducted	Ref.
Ted Urness	C	1958–1960	Saskatchewan Roughriders (1961–1970)	1989	
Terry Vaughn	WR	1990–1993	Calgary Stampeders (1995–1998); Edmonton Eskimos (1999–2004); Montreal Alouettes (2005); Hamilton Tiger-Cats (2006)	2011	

==== College Football Hall of Fame ====
Arizona has four former players and three former coaches who have been inducted into the College Football Hall of Fame as of 2017.

Player	Pos.	Career	Inducted
Warren B. Woodson	Head coach	1952–1956	1989
Ricky Hunley	LB	1980–1983	1997
Jim Young	Head coach	1973–1976	1999
Darrell Mudra	Head coach	1967–1968	2000
Chuck Cecil	S	1984–1987	2009
Rob Waldrop	DT	1990–1993	2011
Tedy Bruschi	DE	1991–1995	2013

== Future opponents ==
On November 1, 2023, Arizona's Big-12 opponents from 2025 through 2027 were revealed, with their rivalry game against Arizona State being a protected annual game.

Future Arizona Wildcats Football Schedule
2026	2027
vs Arizona State	vs Colorado
vs Utah	vs Houston
vs TCU	vs Kansas State
vs Iowa State	vs UCF
vs Cincinnati	at Arizona State
at BYU	at Utah
at Texas Tech	at Baylor
at Kansas State	at Oklahoma State
at West Virginia	at Kansas

=== Non-conference opponents ===
Announced non-conference schedules as of October 1, 2026.

2027	2028	2029	2030	2031	2032	2033
at Colorado State; Sep 4	Colorado State; Sep 2	at Hawaii; Aug 25	at Virginia Tech; Aug 30	Northern Arizona; Aug 30	at Alabama; Sep 4	Alabama; Sep 4
Northern Arizona; Sep 18	Prairie View A&M; Sep 9	Virginia Tech; Sep 8	Northern Arizona; Sep 7	at Air Force; Sep 6	Northern Arizona; Sep 11	Northern Arizona; Sep 10
Washington State; Sep 25	at Nebraska; Sep 16	Air Force; Sep 15	Wyoming; Sep 14	Nebraska; Sep 13		at Wyoming; Sep 17

== Media ==
- Radio flagship: KCUB (AM) - 1290 AM in Tucson, AZ
- Spanish-language radio flagship: KTKT – 990 AM in Tucson, AZ
- Broadcasters: Brian Jeffries (play-by-play) and Lamont Lovett (color analyst)
- Spanish-language broadcasters: Francisco Romero (play-by-play) and Luis Hernandez (analyst)
- Public address announcer: Jeff Dean

The flagship radio station for Wildcat football, men's basketball, and baseball is Tucson sports radio station KCUB, branded as "Wildcats Radio 1290" and simulcast on the FM side on Tucson classic hits station KHYT, branded as "K-Hit 107.5" (football and men's basketball only). From 1983 until 2004, the flagship station was news/talk radio station KNST. The primary play-by-play voice of Wildcat football, baseball and men's basketball, since 1987, is Brian Jeffries (after starting out as the color commentator for former CBS Sports announcer Ray Scott, who called Wildcats games from 1984 through the spring of 1987). The Phoenix radio affiliate for Arizona Wildcats football and men's basketball is KGME, branded as "Fox Sports 910".

== See also ==
- Arizona Wildcats
- List of Border Intercollegiate Athletic Association football champions
- List of Western Athletic Conference football champions
- List of Pac-12 Conference football champions
- List of NCAA Division I FBS football programs
