= 2026 Holiday Bowl (January) =

Postseason college football bowl game

2026 Trust & Will Holiday Bowl
- 46th Holiday Bowl
Arizona Wildcats	SMU Mustangs
(9–3)	(8–4)
Big 12	ACC
19	24
Head coach: Brent Brennan	Head coach: Rhett Lashlee
AP / Coaches / CFP; 21 / 20 / 17
	1	2	3	4	Total
Arizona	0	0	6	13	19
SMU	14	10	0	0	24
- Date: January 2, 2026
- Season: 2025
- Stadium: Snapdragon Stadium
- Location: San Diego, California, US
- MVP: Offensive: Yamir Knight (WR, SMU); Defensive: Ahmaad Moses (S, SMU)
- Favorite: Arizona by 3
- Referee: Steve Marlowe (SEC)
- Attendance: 30,602

United States TV coverage
- Network: FOX
- Announcers: Gus Johnson (play-by-play), Joel Klatt (analyst), and Jenny Taft (sideline)
- Nielsen ratings: 2.39 Million

The 2026 Holiday Bowl was a college football bowl game played on January 2, 2026, at Snapdragon Stadium located in San Diego, California. The 46th annual Holiday Bowl began at approximately 5:00 p.m. PST and aired on Fox. This was the first Holiday Bowl scheduled to be played in January. It was one of the 2025–26 bowl games concluding the 2025 FBS football season. Sponsored by online estate planning company Trust & Will, the game was officially known as the Trust & Will Holiday Bowl.

The SMU Mustangs from the Atlantic Coast Conference (ACC) defeated the Arizona Wildcats from the Big 12 Conference, 24–19.

== Planned move to Saudi Arabia ==
On October 17, 2025, it was reported that the organizers of the Holiday Bowl had met with officials from the Kingdom of Saudi Arabia in the spring to discuss moving the game to Jeddah, moving it away from San Diego for the first time in its history and potentially becoming the first NCAA sanctioned bowl game held outside of North America. (Note: Bowl games have been held in the Caribbean on multiple occasions before the Saudi Arabia proposal, including the Bacardi Bowl in Cuba and the Bahamas Bowl.) After the proposal was brought to the Atlantic Coast Conference (ACC)'s athletic directors, the conference shut down the proposal, ultimately keeping the game in San Diego. Saudi Arabia has been criticized for sportswashing their image with ventures like LIV Golf in order to distract people from their poor human rights record, such as with the murder of Jamal Khashoggi.

== Teams ==
The game featured Arizona from the Big 12 Conference and SMU from the Atlantic Coast Conference (ACC). The teams had met twice previously, with SMU winning in 1938 and Arizona winning in 1985. Many fans jokingly referred to this game as the "Adia Barnes Bowl", as Adia Barnes played basketball at the University of Arizona and was head coach of the Wildcats women's basketball team from 2016 to 2025 before departing to take the vacant head coaching position at SMU.

=== Arizona Wildcats ===
Arizona opened their season with three consecutive wins, then lost three of their next four games. With a 4–3 record at the end of October, the Wildcats finished their schedule with five wins during November. Arizona faced four ranked teams, losing to Iowa State and BYU and defeating Cincinnati and Arizona State. The Wildcats entered the Holiday Bowl with a 9–3 record and ranked 21st in the AP poll.

=== SMU Mustangs ===
SMU lost two of their first four games, then won six of their next seven. Ranked 21st entering their final regular-season game, SMU lost at Cal by three points. SMU entered the Holiday Bowl unranked and with an 8–4 record.

== Game summary ==
2026 Holiday Bowl

Quarter	1	2	3	4	Total
No. 17 Arizona	0	0	6	13	19
SMU	14	10	0	0	24

at Snapdragon Stadium • San Diego, California

- Date: Friday, January 2, 2026
- Game time: 5:00 p.m. PST
- Game weather: Cloudy • Temperature: 63 °F (17 °C) • Wind: 6 mph (9.7 km/h) south
- Game attendance: 30,602
- Referee: Steve Marlowe
- TV announcers (Fox): Gus Johnson (play-by-play), Joel Klatt (analyst), and Jenny Taft (sideline)
- Box score

=== Statistics ===
Statistics	ARIZ	SMU
First downs	26	18
Plays–yards	79–441	64–392
Rushes–yards	36–176	32–114
Passing yards	265	278
Passing: comp–att–int	28–43–1	21–32–3
Turnovers		
Time of possession	33:12	26:48

Team	Category	Player	Statistics
Arizona	Passing	Noah Fifita	28/43, 265 yards, 3 TD, INT
Arizona	Rushing	Noah Fifita	13 carries, 73 yards
Arizona	Receiving	Cameron Barmore	5 receptions, 61 yards, TD
SMU	Passing	Kevin Jennings	21/32, 278 yards, 3 INT
SMU	Rushing	TJ Harden	10 carries, 40 yards, 2 TD
SMU	Receiving	Yamir Knight	7 receptions, 104 yards
