= Kris Hutson =

American football player

No. 4 – Arizona Wildcats
- Position: Wide receiver
- Class: Redshirt Senior

Personal information
- Born: Compton, California, U.S.
- Listed height: 5 ft 11 in (1.80 m)
- Listed weight: 173 lb (78 kg)

Career information
- High school: St. John Bosco (Bellflower, California)
- College: Oregon (2020–2023); Washington State (2024); Arizona (2025)

Awards and highlights
- Third-team All-Big 12 (2025)
- Stats at ESPN

Kris Hutson is an American college football wide receiver for the Arizona Wildcats. He previously played for the Oregon Ducks and the Washington State Cougars.

== Early life ==
Hutson attended St. John Bosco High School in Bellflower, California. In his high school career, he caught 148 passes for 2,491 yards and 31 touchdowns. He committed to the University of Oregon after decommitting from the University of Southern California.

== College career ==
=== Oregon ===
Hutson appeared in all seven games of the COVID-19 shortened 2020 season. He had four receptions for 37 yards. In 2023, he was mostly inactive, though it was unclear if this was due to injury or not. His first and only catch came in Week 5 against Stanford for eight yards.

On December 4, 2023, Hutson announced that he would be entering the transfer portal.

=== Washington State ===
Hutson later announced his intention to play for the Washington State Cougars in 2024.

On December 11, 2024, Hutson announced that he would enter the transfer portal for the second time.

=== Arizona ===
On December 18, 2024, Hutson announced that he would transfer to Arizona.
