= Stuart Forbes (American football) =

American football player and coach (1876–1958)

Biographical details
- Born: December 26, 1876; Cobden, Illinois, U.S.
- Died: July 5, 1958 (aged 81); Bainbridge Island, Washington, U.S.

Playing career
- 1897: Illinois
- Position: Fullback

Coaching career (HC unless noted)
- 1899: Arizona

Head coaching record
- Overall: 1–1–1

Stuart Falconer Forbes (December 26, 1876 – July 5, 1958) was an American football player and coach. He served as the first head football coach at the University of Arizona, coaching for one season in 1899 and compiling a record of 1–1–1.

== Early years ==
Forbes was born in Cobden, Illinois in 1876. He was the son of Henry Clinton Forbes and Jennie Forbes. He attended the University of Illinois, receiving a B.S. degree in architecture in 1898. While attending Illinois, he was the editor-in-chief of the Technograph, a fullback on the varsity football team, and a member of Phi Gamma Delta and the Shield & Trident.

== University of Arizona ==
After graduating from Illinois, Forbes moved to Arizona. In 1899, he volunteered as the coach for the newly organized football team at the University of Arizona. Forbes became the first head coach of what would become the Arizona Wildcats football team. During the 1899 season, Forbes coached the team to a record of 1–1–1. The team won its first football game over a Tucson Town team by a score of 5–0. A rematch resulted in a scoreless tie. The team next defeated a team from the Tucson Indian School before ending the season with an 11–2 loss against Tempe Normal School (later known as Arizona State).

At the time of the 1900 U.S. Census, Forbes was living in Tucson, Arizona, where he was employed as a draftsman.

== Later years ==
In 1907 and 1908, Forbes was living in Tacoma, Washington, where he was employed as the chief draftsman or structural draftsman for the firm of Russell & Babcock. By 1910, he had moved to Seattle where he was employed as a draftsman with Frank Allen Inc. As of 1913, he was still living in Seattle.

At the time of the 1910 U.S. Census, Forbes was living in Seattle with his mother and sister. He was employed as an architect.

As of 1918, Forbes was living in Chicago where he was employed as a supervising engineer for construction quality management at a U.S. government cold storage warehouse.

In 1925, Forbes published a book titled Trail Sketches: Word Pictures of the West.

At the time of the 1940 U.S. Census, he was living in Port Madison, Washington, with his wife Mary L. Forbes. He was employed as the supervising engineer for a building construction company.

In November 1942, Forbes was married to Mary L. Miller by a Justice of the Peace at the courthouse in King County, Washington.

Forbes died in July 1958 at Bainbridge Island, Washington, at age 86.

== Head coaching record ==
| Year | Team | Overall | Conference | Standing | Bowl/playoffs |
|---|---|---|---|---|---|
Arizona (Independent) (1899)
| 1899 | Arizona | 1–1–1 | | | |
| Arizona: | | 1–1–1 | | | |
| Total: | | 1–1–1 | | | |
