= Trust & Will =

Digital estate planning company

- Type: Private
- Industry: Financial technology, Estate planning
- Founded: May 2017; 9 years ago in San Diego, California, U.S.
- Founders: Cody Barbo; Daniel Goldstein; Brian Lamb
- Headquarters: San Diego, California, United States
- Area served: United States
- Key people: Cody Barbo (CEO); Daniel Goldstein (Co-founder & President); Dale Sperling (CMO); Ronald Wangerin (CFO); Bill Parker (CTO)
- Website: trustandwill.com

Trust & Will is a digital estate planning and probate company headquartered in San Diego, California. It also creates digital wills and trust documents in the US.

== History ==
Trust & Will was founded in October 2017 by Cody Barbo, Daniel Goldstein, and Brian Lamb. In November of the same year, Trust & Will won third place in a San Diego start-up competition. In January 2019, the company completed the first electronic will (eWill) in US history.

In December 2019, Trust & Will raised $6 million in a Series A investment funding round to expand sales and marketing, product development, and partnerships.

In June 2020, Trust & Will partnered with Axos Advisor Services to offer financial advisors a comprehensive range of estate planning tools. This collaboration provides financial advisors with access to customized technology that helps their clients navigate and plan for the complexities of estate planning. In August, the company signed a partnership with Fifth Third Bank. In October, Trust & Will partnered with Notarize to launch the first eWill in Florida.

In November 2020, the company secured a $15 million Series B round of financing. The round was led by San Francisco based Jackson Square Ventures (one of Docusign’s biggest venture investors), with new investors, Fifth Third Capital Holdings, Northwestern Mutual Future Ventures, AARP, Rosecliff Ventures, Hack VC, Actium Partners, and Noah Kerner (CEO at Acorns) & Jeff Cruttenden (Cofounder at Say and Acorns).

For three consecutive years (2021, 2022, and 2023), Trust & Will was recognized in Inc's Best Workplaces list, and was named as one of CB Insights' Fintech 250 companies in 2021.

In 2022, UBS Next invested a disclosed amount in Trust & Will. In May, the company acquired EZ-Probate, the leading digital probate settlement provider. In August, Trust & Will got the Best Places to Work Award, according to 2022 San Diego Business Journal.

In October 2022, the startup launched Trust & Will Probate with the goal of streamlining probate and estate settlement with “affordable options”.

In 2023, Trust & Will raised an additional $15 million in funding from a group of high-profile financial institutions.

That same year, Trust & Will was included in the list of Most Innovative Companies 2023 by Fast Company, and CEO, Cody Barbo, was named the Entrepreneur Of The Year 2023 Pacific Southwest Award.

In May 2023, Trust & Will became a Certified B Corporation, earning an overall B Impact Score of 97.7. That same month, Trust & Will announced a strategic partnership with Carson Group, making its estate planning services available to Carson's network of financial advisors.

On July 17, 2023, Trust & Will and San Diego Wave FC signed a multi-year partnership to provide resources and guidance to the club's players, staff, and fans, like customized estate planning. On August 23, 2023, Trust & Will completed the first electronic will (eWill) in Minnesota in collaboration with State Senator Bonnie Westlin to kick off National Make-A-Will Month.

In October 2023, Navy Federal Credit Union, the worlds largest credit union, announced a partnership with Trust & Will to offer estate planning services to its members.

In 2024, Trust & Will was ranked No. 41 on the CNBC Disruptor 50 list.

Trust & Will's fourth annual Millennial Estate Planning Study, published in April 2024, found that 62 percent of millennials had no will or trust.

In April 2024, Trust & Will announced a strategic partnership with LPL Financial, making its estate planning services available to more than 22,000 financial advisors nationwide.

In March 2025, Trust & Will closed a Series C funding round of more than $25 million, led by Moderne Ventures, with participation from Northwestern Mutual Future Ventures, UBS, and Erie Strategic Ventures. The round included an additional $4.5 million investment from Curql, a collective of more than 130 credit unions, and the formation of a new Credit Union Service Organization (CUSO).

In 2025, Trust & Will's annual Estate Planning Report found that the majority of Americans lacked estate planning documents, with economic pressures cited as a primary barrier.

That same year in May, Fifth Third Bank became the first bank in the United States to offer free wills to all of its customers, following an expanded partnership with Trust & Will.

Trust & Will launched EstateOS in June 2025, described as the first intelligent estate planning platform in the United States, connecting estate documents across families, financial advisors, attorneys, and institutions with AI-enabled workflows.

In September 2025, Trust & Will won the Wealth Management Industry Award in Estate Planning: Trusts category.

In December 2025, Trust & Will won the ThinkAdvisor Luminaries Award for Product or Service Innovation (Operations), and was a finalist in three additional categories. That same month, Trust & Will ranked No. 178 on the Deloitte Technology Fast 500, ranking of the 500 fastest-growing technology and life sciences companies in North America, recognized for 456% revenue growth.

Also in December 2025, Trust & Will was announced as the sponsor for the January 2026 edition of the Holiday Bowl.

Trust & Will launched a dedicated platform for estate planning attorneys, offering AI-powered document drafting and client management tools designed for legal professionals in January 2026.

Trust & Will's annual Estate Planning Report, released in April 2026, found that 56 percent of Americans had no estate plan and that 30 percent of respondents trusted AI-generated legal advice more than human attorneys.

The company was named to Fast Company's World's Most Innovative Companies list for a second time in 2026 and received the FinTech Breakthrough Award for Personal Finance Product of the Year.

Trust & Will was named to Forbes' America's Best Startup Employers list in 2026.

Trust & Will was named NACUSO Fintech CUSO of the Year 2026 at the Reimagine Conference in April 2026. That same month, Trust & Will ranked No. 70 on the Financial Times' The Americas' Fastest Growing Companies list.
