= 2026 SMU Mustangs football team =

American college football season

2026 SMU Mustangs football
- Conference: Atlantic Coast Conference
- Record: 7–4 (5–3 ACC)
- Head coach: Rhett Lashlee (5th season)
- Co-offensive coordinators: Rob Likens (4th season); Garin Justice (3rd season)
- Offensive scheme: Bear raid
- Co-defensive coordinators: Maurice Crum Jr. (2nd season); Rickey Hunley Jr. (2nd season)
- Base defense: 4–2–5
- Home stadium: Gerald J. Ford Stadium

Uniform
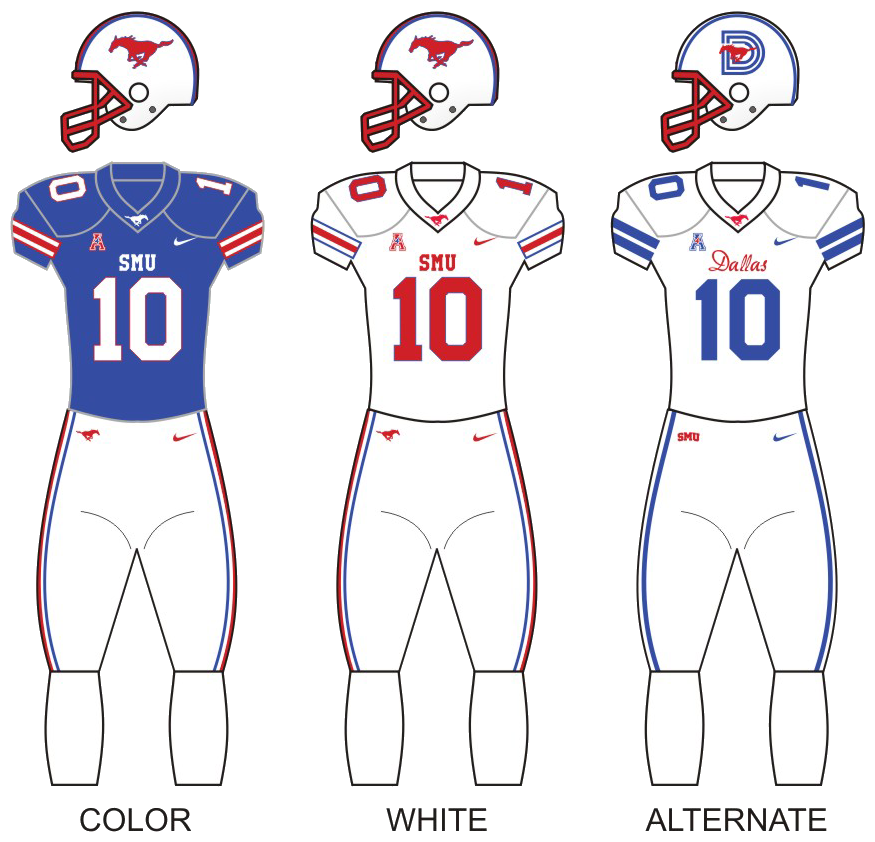

2026 Atlantic Coast Conference football standings
	Conf.			Overall
Team	W		L	W		L
No. 7 Miami (FL) y	8	–	0	10	–	1
No. 11 Wake Forest y	7	–	1	10	–	1
No. 23 Louisville	7	–	2	8	–	3
Clemson	5	–	3	7	–	4
SMU	5	–	3	7	–	4
Duke	4	–	4	7	–	4
Stanford	4	–	4	6	–	5
Virginia	4	–	4	6	–	5
Boston College	3	–	4	5	–	6
Pittsburgh	3	–	5	6	–	5
Virginia Tech	3	–	5	6	–	5
NC State	3	–	5	5	–	6
Florida State	3	–	5	5	–	6
Syracuse	3	–	6	5	–	6
North Carolina	2	–	5	5	–	6
California	2	–	6	3	–	8
Georgia Tech	2	–	6	3	–	8
Championship: Miami (FL) vs. Wake Forest
^ – College Football Playoff participant; $ – Conference champion; y – Championship game participant; As of November 22, 2026; Rankings from CFP rankings

The 2026 SMU Mustangs football team is who represents Southern Methodist University (SMU) as a member of the Atlantic Coast Conference (ACC) during the 2026 NCAA Division I FBS football season. The program is led by fifth-year head coach Rhett Lashlee, the Mustangs play home games at Gerald J. Ford Stadium in University Park, Texas.

== Transfers ==
Incoming

Name	Pos.	Height	Weight	Hometown	Previous School
Christian Davis	DL	6'3"	328 lbs	Ruston, LA	Louisiana Tech
Yannick Smith	WR	6'3"	190 lbs	Summerville, SC	East Carolina
Caden Marshall	LB	6'2"	200 lbs	Paris, TN	Bowling Green
Ira Singleton	EDGE	6'4"	220	Lilburn, GA	South Florida
Jarvis Lee	CB	5'11"	165	Green Cove Springs, FL	South Florida
Jimmy Wyrick	S	5'10"	160	Dallas, TX	UTSA
Malcolm Alcorn-Crowder	DL	6'6"	305	Whitman, MA	Kansas State
Theo Melin Öhrström	TE	6'6"	243	Stockholm, Sweden	Texas A&M
Nick Reed	K	5'7"	181	Harrison, NY	New Hampshire
Randy Pittman	TE	6'2"	230	Panama City, FL	Florida State
Trey Jackson	TE	6'4.5"	210	Dallas, TX	Texas Tech
Jalen Hale	WR	6'0.5"	185	Longview, TX	Alabama
Kendrick Raphael	RB	5'10"	187	Naples, FL	California
Marques White	EDGE	6'2"	250	Glendale, AZ	UMass
Jamal Anderson	LB	6'2"	215	Hoschton, GA	Clemson
Jayvon Thomas	CB	5'10.5"	170	Dallas, TX	Texas A&M

Outgoing

Name	Pos.	Height	Weight	Hometown	New School
King Large	IOL	6'5"	300	Bellflower, CA	Missouri State
Kyle Ferm	LB	6'3"	225	Glendora, CA	Liberty
DJ Warner	EDGE	6'4"	215	Goodyear, AZ	Washington State
Nolan Akins	LS	6'1"	200	Flower Mound, TX	Oklahoma State
Omari Abor	DL	6'4"	240	Duncanville, TX	Unknown
Collin Rogers	K	6'4"	185	Prattville, AL	Florida Atlantic
Braeden Flowers	EDGE	6'3"	260	San Antonio, TX	Unknown
Elijah Pratt	S	5'11"	165	Arlington, TX	UAB
Zakye Barker	LB	5'11"	220	Norcross, GA	North Texas
Blake Burris	DL	6'4"	262	Irving, TX	Florida Atlantic
Paris Patterson Jr.	IOL	6'4"	355	East St. Louis, IL	Texas
Billy Walton	EDGE	6'2.5"	215	Dallas, TX	Oklahoma State
Jaxson Lavender	WR	5'10"	174	Dallas, TX	Tarleton State
Lance Beeghley	WR	6'2"	194	New Braunfels, TX	Iowa
Kyron Chambers	CB	6'1"	195	Dallas, TX	UNLV
Zach Hernandez	RB	5'6"	188	Dallas, TX	Unknown
Christopher Johnson	RB	5'11"	184	Fort Lauderdale, FL	Clemson
Adam Moore	TE	6'2"	220	Miami, FL	Unknown
Justin Medlock	LB	6'0"	207	Manvel, TX	Boston College
Damarjhe Lewis	DL	6'3"	301	Griffin, GA	Washington State
Mark Iheanachor	LB	6'1.5"	220	Harbor City, CA	UNLV
Sam Keltner	K	5'10"	180	Keller, TX	Oklahoma State
Devon Martin	TE	6'5"	240	Mesquite, TX	Unknown
James Larson	TE	6'4"	235	St. Charles, IL	LSU
Cameron McCullouch	LS	6'4"	210	Houston, TX	Sam Houston

== Schedule ==
In January 2026, SMU Athletics announced football season ticket pricing for the 2026 season. The pricing structure reflected attendance trends and program growth, with seating options including general admission and premium experiences.

Date	Time	Opponent	Rank	Site	TV	Result	Attendance
September 7	6:30 p.m.	at Florida State	No. 19	Doak Campbell Stadium; Tallahassee, FL	ESPN	W 27–24	60,107
September 12	3:00 p.m.	No. 7 (FCS) UC Davis*	No. 17	Gerald J. Ford Stadium; University Park, TX	ACCNX	W 56–10	29,054
September 19	2:30 p.m.	at No. 23 Louisville	No. 16	L&N Federal Credit Union Stadium; Louisville, KY	ESPN2	L 31–41	50,199
September 26	8:00 p.m.	Missouri State*	No. 22	Gerald J. Ford Stadium; University Park, TX	ACCN	W 34–24	31,987
October 3	11:00 a.m.	Boston College	No. 21	Gerald J. Ford Stadium; University Park, TX	The CW	W 25–16	27,942
October 17	11:00 a.m.	Virginia	No. 24	Gerald J. Ford Stadium; University Park, TX	The CW	W 23–13	28,713
October 24	11:00 a.m.	California	No. 23	Gerald J. Ford Stadium; University Park, TX	The CW	W 59–20	26,463
October 31	11:00 a.m.	at Syracuse	No. 19	JMA Wireless Dome; Syracuse, NY	ESPN2	L 27–30	33,396
November 6	6:00 p.m.	Virginia Tech		Gerald J. Ford Stadium; University Park, TX	ESPN	W 51–28	32,566
November 14	11:00 a.m.	No. 13 Wake Forest^{†}		Gerald J. Ford Stadium; University Park, TX	ESPN	L 7–49	33,571
November 21	6:30 p.m.	at No. 6 Notre Dame*		Notre Dame Stadium; Notre Dame, IN	NBC	L 3–24	
November 28	2:30 p.m.	at Stanford		Stanford Stadium; Stanford, CA	ACCN		
*Non-conference game; ^{†}Homecoming; Rankings from AP Poll (and CFP Rankings after November 4) – Released prior to game; All times are in Central time; Source:

== Rankings ==
Ranking movements Legend: ██ Increase in ranking ██ Decrease in ranking — = Not ranked RV = Received votes
	Week															
Poll	Pre	1	2	3	4	5	6	7	8	9	10	11	12	13	14	Final
AP	19	17	16	22	21	24	24	23	19	RV	25	RV				
Coaches	20	17	16	25	19	21	22	20	16	24	23	RV				
CFP	Not released									—	—	—				Not released

== Personnel ==
Quarterback Kevin Jennings returned to the team for his final year of eligibility. It is his third consecutive year as the starter and fifth as a member of the team, uncommon in the era of the transfer portal. Safety Ahmaad Moses, who graduated and declared for the 2025 NFL Draft, is seeking an additional year of eligibility after a court ruling did so for other players who started college in 2022.

2026 SMU Mustangs football team roster
Players
Coaches
Offense

Pos.	#	Name	Class
RB, WR	0	Derrick McFall	So
QB	1	Ty Hawkins	Fr
WR	2	Jalen Hale	Jr
WR	3	Yannick Smith	Jr
RB	4	Dramekco Green	Fr
TE	5	Randy Pittman Jr.	Sr
RB	6	Kendrick Raphael	Sr
QB	7	Kevin Jennings (C)	Sr
WR	8	Yamir Knight	Sr
TE	9	Zack Turner	Fr
WR	10	Jalen Cooper	So
WR	11	Carterrious Brown	Fr
QB	12	Cole Leinart	Fr
WR	13	Daylon Singleton	So
QB	14	Charlie Fiser	Sr
WR	15	Aljour Miles II	Fr
WR	16	Jakai Anderson	Fr
TE	18	Theo Melin Öhrström	Sr
RB	20	EJ Kelly	Fr
RB	21	Christian Rhodes	Fr
WR	22	Jordyn Adams	Fr
RB	24	Link Rhodes	Sr
RB	25	William Fierro	Jr
WR	26	David Kniffen Jr.	Fr
WR	27	Siler Cooke	Fr
TE	42	Will Locke	So
WR	45	Isaiah Robertson	Fr
OL	50	Graham Uter	So
OL	52	Toa Katoa	Fr
OL	55	Sam Utu	Fr
OL	57	Henry Douglass	Jr
OL	58	Abel Hoopii	So
OL	59	P. J. Williams	Sr
OL	60	Evan Goodwin	Fr
OL	63	Addison Nichols	Sr
OL	64	Joshua Bates	Jr
OL	66	Hunter Ryan	Sr
OL	70	Paxton Briggle	Jr
OL	71	Max Wright	Fr
OL	74	Andrew Chamblee	Sr
OL	75	Dramodd Odoms	Fr
OL	76	Drew Hill	Fr
OL	77	Alex Woods	Jr
OL	78	Drew Evers	Fr
OL	79	Sione Ma'u	Jr
WR	81	Tyrone Crethers	Fr
WR	83	X'Zavier Barnett	Fr
TE	84	Tripp Riordan	Jr
TE	85	Andre Nickerson Jr.	Fr
TE	86	Devon Martin	Sr
TE	88	Trey Jackson	So
TE	89	Miles Uter	Fr

Defense

Pos.	#	Name	Class
CB	0	William Nettles	So
S	1	Jarvis Lee	Sr
CB	2	Zadian Gentry	Fr
CB	3	Javion Holiday	So
CB	4	Jayvon Thomas	Sr
DL	5	Malcolm Alcorn-Crowder	Sr
DE	6	Tavion Atkinson	Jr
CB	8	Marcellus Barnes Jr.	So
DE	9	Ira Singleton IV	Jr
S	10	Tyren Polley	So
S	11	Jaden Milliner-Jones	Jr
LB	12	Caden Marshall	So
CB	13	Jaelyn Davis-Robinson	Sr
DE	14	Trey Wilson	Sr
S	15	La'Modrick Spencer	Sr
DE	16	Marques White	GS
CB	20	Deuce Gilbert	Fr
S	21	Jimmy Wyrick	GS
S	22	Sael Reyes	So
LB	24	I'Zayah Young	Fr
S	26	Jaylen Moses	So
S	27	Abdul Muhammad	Jr
LB	28	Brandon Booker	Jr
LB	29	Brandon Miyazono	Sr
LB	30	Kenneth Goodwin III	Fr
LB	32	Jamal Anderson	Jr
DE	33	Amontre Harris	Fr
CB	35	Dante Wesley II	So
S	38	Jake Ballard	So
LB	42	Ryan Earle	Fr
CB	44	Michael De Hoyos	Sr
LB	46	Xavier Wright	So
LB	50	Marcus Brouse	Fr
DE	52	Jahkai Lang	Jr
LB	53	Zachary Hibner	Fr
LB	54	Alexander Kilgore	Sr
DT	55	Woo Spencer	Jr
DT	56	Tyron Winslow	Fr
DE	58	Aakil Washington	GS
DE	90	Jalen Shivers	Fr
DE	92	Hudson Woods	Fr
DT	93	Kevin Allen	Jr
DT	94	Jonathan Jefferson	GS
DE	95	Wyatt Smith	Fr
DE	96	Christian de Moor	So
DL	97	Christian Davis	Jr
DL	98	Keith Dotie	Fr
DL	99	Dakota Dickson	Fr

Special teams

Pos.	#	Name	Class
P	43	Wade McSparron	So
LS	47	Cody Williford	Fr
LS	48	Morgan Tribbett	Jr
K	96	Wiley Olson	Fr
K	99	Nick Reed	Jr

Head coach

- Rhett Lashlee

Coordinators/assistant coaches

- Rob Likens
  Associate head coach/Chief of staff/Co-offensive coordinator/Wide receivers
- Garin Justice
  Assistant head coach/Co-offensive coordinator/Offensive line
- D'Eriq King
  Co-offensive coordinator/Quarterbacks
- Kyle Cooper
  Running backs/Run game coordinator
- Riley Dodge
  Tight ends/Passing game coordinator
- Maurice Crum Jr.
  Co-defensive coordinator/Play caller
- Rickey Hunley Jr.
  Co-defensive coordinator/Secondary
- Sam Dunnam
  Edges
- Calvin Thibodeaux
  Defensive line
- Kyle Ward
  Cornerbacks
- Casey Horny
  Special teams coordinator
- Parker Stone
  Assistant tight ends/Senior analyst
- Ryan Jenkins
  Inside wide receivrs
- Reggie Bain
  Assistant offensive line
- Matthew McHugh
  Assistant running backs
- Carson Morris
  Assistant quarterbacks
- Warren Messer
  Linebackers
- Demerick Gary
  Assistant defensive ends
- Sam Gregg
  Senior assistant to the defensive coordinator
- Jalen Ivy
  Assistant defensive line
- Ryan Ragone
  Assistant linebackers
- Jonathan McGill
  Assistant secondary
- Justin March
  Assistant special teams coordinator
- Tyler Van Dyke
  Offensive assistant
- Brandon Sukenik
  Special teams assistant

Legend

- (C) Team captain
- (S) Suspended
- (I) Ineligible
- Injured
- Redshirt

Roster
Last update: June 24, 2026

== Game summaries ==
=== at Florida State ===
No. 19 SMU Mustangs (0–0) at Florida State Seminoles (1–0) – Game summary

Quarter	1	2	3	4	Total
No. 19 Mustangs	7	10	0	10	27
Seminoles	7	3	7	7	24

at Doak Campbell Stadium • Tallahassee, Florida

- Date: September 7
- Game time: 6:30 p.m. CDT / 7:30 p.m. EDT
- Game weather: Sunny, 81 °F (27 °C)
- Game attendance: 60,107
- Referee: Mike Roche
- TV announcers (ESPN): Dave Pasch, Dusty Dvoracek, and Taylor McGregor
- Box score, Recap

Game information

First quarter

- SMU – Jalen Cooper 50-yard pass from Kevin Jennings (Nick Reed kick), 9:32. Mustangs 7–0. Drive: 6 plays, 75 yards, 1:38.
- FSU – Ashton Daniels 8-yard run (Gabe Panikowski kick), 1:55. Tied 7–7. Drive: 13 plays, 75 yards, 7:37.

Second quarter

- SMU – Randy Pittman Jr. 10-yard pass from Kevin Jennings (Nick Reed kick), 5:35. Mustangs 14–7. Drive: 8 plays, 43 yards, 3:30.
- FSU – Gabe Panikowski 46-yard field goal, 3:58. Mustangs 14–10. Drive: 5 plays, 47 yards, 1:37.
- SMU – Nick Reed 22-yard field goal, 1:49. Mustangs 17–10. Drive: 5 plays, 69 yards, 2:09.

Third quarter

- FSU – Ousmane Kromah 6-yard run (Gabe Panikowski kick), 2:08. Tied 17–17. Drive: 8 plays, 29 yards, 4:40.

Fourth quarter

- SMU – Yannick Smith 79-yard pass from Kevin Jennings (Nick Reed kick), 12:37. Mustangs 24–17. Drive: 8 plays, 75 yards, 4:20.
- FSU – Samuel Singleton Jr. 39-yard pass from Ashton Daniels (Gabe Panikowski kick), 8:17. Tied 24–24. Drive: 8 plays, 75 yards, 4:20.
- SMU – Nick Reed 20-yard field goal, 0:21. Mustangs 27–24. Drive: 9 plays, 71 yards, 4:35.

Statistics	SMU	FSU
First downs	23	16
Plays–yards	67–585	68–324
Rushes–yards	31–155	45–199
Passing yards	430	125
Passing: comp–att–int	26–36–2	12–23–0
Turnovers	4	1
Time of possession	27:44	32:16

Team	Category	Player	Statistics
SMU	Passing	Kevin Jennings	26/36, 430 yards, 3 TD, 2 INT
SMU	Rushing	Kendrick Raphael	12 carries, 75 yards
SMU	Receiving	Yannick Smith	5 receptions, 107 yards, TD
Florida State	Passing	Ashton Daniels	12/23, 125 yards, TD
Florida State	Rushing	Ousmane Kromah	22 carries, 116 yards, TD
Florida State	Receiving	Samuel Singleton Jr.	2 receptions, 40 yards, TD

SMU defeated Florida State 27–24 on Labor Day. Shortly before the start of the game, Doak Campbell Stadium suffered a major power outage. The outage was unrelated to any inclement weather, creating uncertainty as to if it would be restored quickly enough to play the game that night. Administrators from both schools and the ACC met throughout the outage to discuss contingency plans for a possible postponement, as well as for how to operate the game if the stadium were to have power properly restored. An hour and 40 minutes after the game's scheduled kick time, the game began with no scoreboard, no coach-to-player headset communication, and no video review. Midway through the second quarter, most of the stadium's remaining electrical systems came online, and the game proceeded as any other for the rest of its duration.

SMU's victory came despite several miscues throughout the game. The team trailed the turnover margin 4–0, (Note: Excluding an intercepted lateral pass on the last play of the game.) with two interceptions, a muffed punt, and a lost fumble. The team's defense largely prevented Florida State from capitalizing on these errors, keeping the game close, although an offside penalty on a field goal try allowed Florida State to score a touchdown to tie the game 17–17 in the third quarter. Florida State only managed to convert two out fifteen third down plays. SMU's offense, led by veteran quarterback Kevin Jennings, was explosive throughout the game, totaling nearly 600 yards, including several long touchdown passes. This continued entering the fourth quarter, with SMU quickly scoring to retake their lead, but Florida State quickly answered with their own touchdown to tie the game once again 24–24. SMU's subsequent drive was cut short by Jennings' second interception of the night. After regaining the ball once again with the game still tied, SMU approached field goal range and began running out the clock before kicking a go-ahead field goal with 25 seconds on the clock. Florida State failed to advance at all on their final drive, and the game ended after SMU intercepted a desperation lateral pass, their only turnover of the night.

=== No. 7 (FCS) UC Davis ===
No. 7 (FCS) UC Davis Aggies (2–0) at No. 17 SMU Mustangs (1–0) – Game summary

Quarter	1	2	3	4	Total
No. 7 (FCS) Aggies	0	0	0	10	10
No. 17 Mustangs	14	28	7	7	56

at Gerald J. Ford Stadium • University Park, Texas

- Date: September 12
- Game time: 3:00 p.m. CDT
- Game weather: Sunny • Temperature: 100 °F (38 °C)
- Game attendance: 29,054
- Referee: Jerry Magallanes
- TV announcers (ACCNX): Robert Lee and Mo Hasan

Game information

First quarter

- SMU – Kendrick Raphael 5-yard run (Nick Reed kick), 6:40. Mustangs 7–0. Drive: 8 plays, 90 yards, 3:47.
- SMU – Derrick McFall 52-yard pass from Kevin Jennings (Nick Reed kick), 1:18. Mustangs 14–0. Drive: 3 plays, 75 yards, 0:43.

Second quarter

- SMU – Theo Melin Ohrstrom 2-yard pass from Kevin Jennings (Nick Reed kick), 12:33. Mustangs 21–0. Drive: 4 plays, 72 yards, 1:31.
- SMU – Randy Pittman Jr. 2-yard pass from Kevin Jennings (Nick Reed kick), 10:28. Mustangs 28–0. Drive: 5 plays, 67 yards, 1:12.
- SMU – Theo Melin Ohrstrom 14-yard pass from Kevin Jennings (Nick Reed kick), 0:59. Mustangs 35–0. Drive: 2 plays, 20 yards, 0:44.
- SMU – Yannick Smith 44-yard pass from Kevin Jennings (Nick Reed kick), 0:24. Mustangs 42–0. Drive: 1 play, 44 yards, 0:11.

Third quarter

- SMU – Zack Turner 8-yard pass from Ty Hawkins (Brendan Baird kick), 6:12. Mustangs 49–0. Drive: 6 plays, 65 yards, 2:37.

Fourth quarter

- UCD – Coby Herman 4-yard pass from Jackson Kollock (Robert Meyer kick), 11:18. Mustangs 49–7. Drive: 9 plays, 45 yards, 7:15.
- SMU – Aljour Miles II 3-yard pass from Ty Hawkins (Brendan Baird kick), 9:01. Mustangs 56–7. Drive: 5 plays, 50 yards, 2:10.
- UCD – Robert Meyer 33-yard field goal, 3:35. Mustangs 56–10. Drive: 6 plays, 58 yards, 3:03.

Statistics	UCD	SMU
First downs	12	20
Plays–yards	60–233	56–547
Rushes–yards	24–62	24–93
Passing yards	171	454
Passing: comp–att–int	19–36–1	27–32–0
Turnovers	2	0
Time of possession	32:40	27:20

Team	Category	Player	Statistics
UC Davis	Passing	Jackson Kollock	8/10, 88 yards, TD
UC Davis	Rushing	Jordan Fisher	8 carries, 19 yards
UC Davis	Receiving	Samuel Gbatu Jr.	5 receptions, 60 yards
SMU	Passing	Kevin Jennings	14/16, 337 yards, 5 TD
SMU	Rushing	Derrick McFall	6 carries, 46 yards
SMU	Receiving	Yamir Knight	3 receptions, 62 yards

SMU routed UC Davis, taking a 42–0 halftime lead. During the game, Kevin Jennings surpassed Ben Hicks' record of 8,977 total yards, becoming SMU's all-time leader on offense. Due to extreme heat, both teams agreed to shorten the second half by six minutes. Backup quarterback Ty Hawkins came in during the second half and threw two touchdowns of his own, finishing out a 56–10 victory.

=== at No. 23 Louisville ===
No. 16 SMU Mustangs (2–0) at No. 23 Louisville Cardinals (1–1) – Game summary

Quarter	1	2	3	4	Total
No. 16 Mustangs	7	10	7	7	31
No. 23 Cardinals	14	0	14	13	41

at L&N Federal Credit Union Stadium • Louisville, Kentucky

- Date: September 19
- Game time: 2:30 p.m. CDT / 3:30 p.m. EDT
- Game weather: Sunny • Temperature: 95 °F (35 °C) • Wind: NW at 8 miles per hour (13 km/h)
- Game attendance: 50,199
- Referee: Justin Elliott
- TV announcers (ESPN2): Roy Philpott, Brock Osweiler, and Sherree Burress

Game information

First quarter

- (11:35) SMU – Kendrick Raphael 2-yard run (Nick Reed kick) (Drive: 8 plays, 75 yards, 3:25; SMU 7–0)
- (5:19) LOU – Lincoln Kienholz 1-yard run (Carson Hilbert kick) (Drive: 12 plays, 75 yards, 6:16; Tied 7–7)
- (1:38) LOU – Lawayne McCoy 33-yard pass from Lincoln Kienholz (Carson Hilbert kick) (Drive: 4 plays, 30 yards, 2:03; Louisville 14–7)

Second quarter

- (13:12) SMU – Yamir Knight 19-yard pass from Kevin Jennings (Nick Reed kick) (Drive: 7 plays, 35 yards, 3:26; Tied 14–14)
- (0:00) SMU – Nick Reed 46-yard field goal (Drive: 5 plays, 10 yards, 1:14; SMU 17–14)

Third quarter

- (14:17) LOU – Keyjuan Brown 58-yard run (Carson Hilbert kick) (Drive: 2 plays, 75 yards, 0:43; Louisville 21–17)
- (6:12) SMU – Kendrick Raphael 25-yard run (Nick Reed kick) (Drive: 11 plays, 86 yards, 4:15; SMU 24–21)
- (2:41) LOU – Jaleel Skinner 4-yard pass from Lincoln Kienholz (Carson Hilbert kick) (Drive: 9 plays, 75 yards, 3:31; Louisville 28–24)

Fourth quarter

- (11:33) SMU – Kendrick Raphael 12-yard run (Nick Reed kick) (Drive: 8 plays, 52 yards, 2:34; SMU 31–28)
- (10:02) LOU – Keyjuan Brown 53-yard run (Carson Hilbert kick) (Drive: 4 plays, 75 yards, 1:31; Louisville 35–31)
- (5:32) LOU – Isaac Brown 27-yard run (Carson Hilbert kick failed) (Drive: 3 plays, 64 yards, 1:53; Louisville 41–31)

Statistics	SMU	LOU
First downs	27	22
Total yards	479	442
Rushes–yards	45–257	37–265
Passing yards	222	177
Passing: comp–att–int	24–35–2	14–23–0
Turnovers	3	0
Time of possession	31:56	28:04

Team	Category	Player	Statistics
SMU	Passing	Kevin Jennings	24/35, 222 yards, TD, 2 INT
SMU	Rushing	Kendrick Raphael	24 carries, 197 yards, 3 TD
SMU	Receiving	Yamir Knight	7 receptions, 70 yards, TD
Louisville	Passing	Lincoln Kienholz	14/23, 177 yards, 2 TD
Louisville	Rushing	Keyjuan Brown	10 carries, 162 yards, 2 TD
Louisville	Receiving	Lawayne McCoy	4 receptions, 62 yards, TD

SMU lost to Louisville in a 41–31 shootout, dealing a significant blow to the team's chances of making the ACC championship game. Often tied during the first half, the teams traded the lead five times throughout the second half of the game until Louisville pulled away in the fourth quarter with a ten-point lead. Both teams leaned significantly on their running game, with Cal transfer Kendrick Raphael recording career highs in both rushing yards and touchdowns. Defensively, SMU allowed Louisville to make several breakaway running plays, contributing to their defeat.

In addition to committing three turnovers, the team also failed two fourth down conversions. For the first, early in the game, SMU opted against punting on Louisville's side of the field. Louisville capitalized on the mistake, taking the lead soon after. The other took place as SMU attempted to make a comeback during the fourth quarter, where Kevin Jennings ran with the ball and failed to make the conversion, allowing Louisville to take a two-score lead soon after. Jennings committed two further turnovers while attempting to mount a comeback, a consistent issue throughout his career. While running the ball himself for a touchdown, Louisville forced a fumble at the one yard line, and the ball fell out of the endzone for a touchback, and on the team's final possession, Jennings threw an interception, sealing SMU's defeat.

=== Missouri State ===
Missouri State Bears (1–2) at No. 22 SMU Mustangs (2–1) – Game summary

Quarter	1	2	3	4	Total
Bears	10	0	0	14	24
No. 22 Mustangs	0	14	7	13	34

at Gerald J. Ford Stadium • University Park, Texas

- Date: September 26
- Game time: 8:00 p.m. CDT
- TV announcers (ACCN): Roxy Bernstein, Dave Clawson, and Madison Hock

Game information

First quarter
Second quarter
Third quarter
Fourth quarter

Statistics	MOST	SMU
First downs	14	28
Total yards	239	592
Rushes–yards	28–68	40–128
Passing yards	171	464
Passing: comp–att–int	22–34–1	33–39–1
Turnovers	1	2
Time of possession	25:46	34:14

Team	Category	Player	Statistics
Missouri State	Passing	Skyler Locklear	15/19, 102 yards, TD
Missouri State	Rushing	Breezy Dubar	7 carries, 76 yards
Missouri State	Receiving	Isaiah Myers	5 receptions, 46 yards, TD
SMU	Passing	Kevin Jennings	33/39, 464 yards, 3 TD, INT
SMU	Rushing	Kendrick Raphael	23 carries, 98 yards, TD
SMU	Receiving	Yamir Knight	11 receptions, 164 yards, TD

SMU defeated Missouri State 34–24 in a game highly reminiscent of the team's first meeting in 2025. Like in 2025, Missouri State, now led by former SMU offensive coordinator Casey Woods, took a 10–0 lead in the first quarter before SMU took control of the game and won. Unlike in 2025, however, after SMU took the lead, Missouri State kept the game close in an attempted fourth quarter comeback, but they fell short and lost by 10 points. SMU continued its struggles with turnovers that had haunted them all season, with a pick-six thrown by Jennings and a red zone fumble by Yamir Knight contributing to Missouri State's early lead. SMU already had one of the worst turnover margins of any FBS team entering the game and had yet to win the turnover margin against any FBS opponent. Kicking proved another point of struggle for SMU, as it had in 2025 where they lost three games by three points or less. SMU missed both of its field goal attempts, each from a different placekicker, and they missed an extra point due to a bad snap and hold.

During the game, Kevin Jennings broke four more school records. He broke two records previously held by Ben Hicks, surpassing 9,081 career passing yards and beating his career completions record. He also broke Tanner Mordecai's record of 78 total career touchdowns and Josh McCown's record of 19 consecutive completions, throwing 21 straight.

=== Boston College ===
Boston College Eagles (2–2) at No. 21 SMU Mustangs (3–1) – Game summary

Quarter	1	2	3	4	Total
Eagles	10	0	0	6	16
No. 21 Mustangs	6	7	6	6	25

at Gerald J. Ford Stadium • University Park, Texas

- Date: October 3
- Game time: 11:00 a.m.
- TV announcers (The CW): Thom Brennaman, Jason Cabinda, and Wes Bryant

Statistics	BC	SMU
First downs	19	21
Total yards	322	218
Rushes–yards	33–114	32–58
Passing yards	208	160
Passing: comp–att–int	20–32–0	20–30–0
Turnovers	1	0
Time of possession	33:05	26:55

Team	Category	Player	Statistics
Boston College	Passing	Mason McKenzie	20/31, 208 yards, 2 TD
Boston College	Rushing	Mason McKenzie	21 carries, 74 yards
Boston College	Receiving	Evan Dickens	3 receptions, 25 yards, TD
SMU	Passing	Kevin Jennings	20/30, 160 yards, 2 TD
SMU	Rushing	Kendrick Raphael	15 carries, 45 yards, TD
SMU	Receiving	Jalen Cooper	5 receptions, 45 yards

SMU defeated Boston College 25–16, severely underperforming pregame expectations. SMU's offense struggled in the rain, gaining less than half of their average yardage during the course of the game. The team's rushing and passing games both struggled, although this was their first FBS opponent against whom SMU committed no turnovers. Special teams struggles continued to plague the team, failing two extra point conversions off of bad holds. To compensate for these struggles, SMU's defense stifled Boston College through most of the game, sacking quarterback Mason McKenzie five times and forcing three fumbles.

=== Virginia ===
Virginia Cavaliers (4–2) at No. 24 SMU Mustangs (4–1) – Game summary

Quarter	1	2	3	4	Total
Cavaliers	0	10	3	0	13
No. 24 Mustangs	3	10	3	7	23

at Gerald J. Ford Stadium • University Park, Texas

- Date: October 17
- Game time: 11:00 a.m.
- TV announcers (The CW): Thom Brennaman, Jason Cabinda, and Wes Bryant

Statistics	UVA	SMU
First downs	13	23
Total yards	258	404
Rushes–yards	32–121	33–158
Passing yards	137	246
Passing: comp–att–int	13–22–0	23–26–0
Turnovers	1	0
Time of possession	29:01	30:59

Team	Category	Player	Statistics
Virginia	Passing	Beau Pribula	13/22, 137 yards
Virginia	Rushing	Jekail Middlebrook	14 carries, 59 yards
Virginia	Receiving	Da'shawn Martin	2 receptions, 35 yards
SMU	Passing	Kevin Jennings	23/26, 246 yards, 2 TD
SMU	Rushing	Kendrick Raphael	22 carries, 124 yards
SMU	Receiving	Yannick Smith	5 receptions, 87 yards

SMU defeated Virginia 23–13 in a much cleaner game than previous victories. SMU's first drive ended with a turnover on downs on their own 34-yard line after a dropped deep pass, but Virginia fumbled the ball near the endzone, committing the game's only turnover. Tied 10–10 on the last play of the first half, a penalty by Virginia put SMU in field goal range, allowing them to take the lead entering halftime. Special teams improved substantially compared to previous games, with former SMU soccer player Brendan Baird making all three attempted field goals throughout the game. A fourth quarter touchdown reception by Jordan Hale extended SMU's lead to two scores, a margin they held for the rest of the game.

=== California ===
California Golden Bears (3–4) at No. 23 SMU Mustangs (5–1) – Game summary

Quarter	1	2	3	4	Total
Golden Bears	7	13	0	0	20
No. 23 Mustangs	10	7	21	21	59

at Gerald J. Ford Stadium • University Park, Texas

- Date: October 24
- TV announcers (The CW): Thom Brennaman, Jason Cabinda, and Wes Bryant

Statistics	CAL	SMU
First downs		
Total yards		
Rushing yards		
Passing yards		
Turnovers		
Time of possession		

Team	Category	Player	Statistics
California	Passing		
California	Rushing		
California	Receiving		
SMU	Passing		
SMU	Rushing		
SMU	Receiving		

SMU routed Cal 59–20 after having entered halftime down 17–20. The teams appeared nearly evenly matched during the first half, with several mistakes holding back SMU, such as allowing Cal to convert a first down on a fake field goal that eventually led to a touchdown. Cal rallied behind quarterback Jaron-Keawe Sagapolutele, who returned from an injury to throw for over 200 yards in the first half, and the team kicked a field goal as time expired in the first half to take the lead. Starting in the second half, however, SMU completely stifled Sagapolutele and the rest of Cal's offense, shutting them out, while SMU's offense scored touchdowns on six consecutive drives. On the second touchdown of the half, Kevin Jennings threw his 73rd career touchdown pass, breaking SMU's career passing touchdown record previously held by Tanner Mordecai. Jennings also finished his third game in a row without throwing an interception, his longest stretch of doing so since 2024, and a marked improvement on the five interceptions he had thrown in the previous four games this season. Kendrick Raphael, a former Cal Golden Bear, led SMU's rushing offense with over 100 yards, but freshman running backs Christian Rhodes and EJ Kelly also saw significant action, scoring three rushing touchdowns.

=== at Syracuse ===
No. 19 SMU Mustangs (6–1) at Syracuse Orange (3–4) – Game summary

Quarter	1	2	3	4	Total
No. 19 Mustangs	10	0	7	10	27
Orange	7	13	0	10	30

at JMA Wireless Dome • Syracuse, New York

- Date: October 31
- TV announcers (ESPN2): Anish Shroff, Andre Ware, and Morgan Uber

Statistics	SMU	SYR
First downs		
Total yards		
Rushing yards		
Passing yards		
Turnovers		
Time of possession		

Team	Category	Player	Statistics
SMU	Passing		
SMU	Rushing		
SMU	Receiving		
Syracuse	Passing		
Syracuse	Rushing		
Syracuse	Receiving		

SMU lost to Syracuse 27–30. Their sluggish defense allowed Syracuse to take a 20–10 lead at halftime, including three points following a fumble by receiver Jalen Hale. Special teams penalties proved particularly costly to SMU, with a facemask penalty giving Syracuse good field position on one drive and a blindside block penalty negating a 50-yard return that would have started a drive on Syracuse's 8-yard line. Syracuse also sacked Kevin Jennings four times throughout the game, more than in any previous game all season. SMU's offense reignited in the second half, taking their own 27–20 lead with 9 minutes to go in the fourth quarter. On their final offensive drive, however, a dropped pass by tight end Theo Melin Öhrström forced a punt, after which Syracuse ran down the remainder of the clock and scored a touchdown with only 17 seconds left, taking a 3-point lead. SMU's desperation drive sputtered, with Syracuse intercepting a lateral pass on the final play of the game to seal their victory.

SMU's second conference loss significantly hampers their ability to make the ACC championship game, requiring the team to win all of its remaining conference games and likely forcing them to rely on tiebreakers among the other two-loss ACC teams.

=== Virginia Tech ===
Virginia Tech Hokies (6–2) at SMU Mustangs (6–2) – Game summary

Quarter	1	2	3	4	Total
Hokies	0	14	0	14	28
Mustangs	10	13	14	14	51

at Gerald J. Ford Stadium • University Park, Texas

- Date: November 6
- Game time: 6:00 p.m. CST
- TV announcers (ESPN): Mike Monaco, Jordan Rodgers, and Dana Boyle

Statistics	VT	SMU
First downs		
Total yards		
Rushing yards		
Passing yards		
Turnovers		
Time of possession		

Team	Category	Player	Statistics
Virginia Tech	Passing		
Virginia Tech	Rushing		
Virginia Tech	Receiving		
SMU	Passing		
SMU	Rushing		
SMU	Receiving		

SMU routed Virginia Tech, winning 51–28 despite Virginia Tech's strong defense in its previous games during the season. SMU scored on nine of its ten drives during the game, with one ending in an interception after a pass bounced off another player's helmet, Kevin Jennings' first in five games. Leading 23–14 at the half, SMU extended its lead to 29 points by the fourth quarter, with the team's defense stopping an attempted rally by Virginia Tech to seal the victory. Wide receiver Yamir "Miz" Knight caught three touchdown passes during the game, the most in a single game during his career at SMU.

=== No. 13 Wake Forest ===
No. 13 Wake Forest Demon Deacons (8–1) at SMU Mustangs (7–2) – Game summary

Quarter	1	2	3	4	Total
No. 13 Demon Deacons	14	28	0	7	49
Mustangs	0	0	7	0	7

at Gerald J. Ford Stadium • University Park, Texas

- Date: November 14
- TV announcers (ESPN): Tom Hart, Roddy Jones, and Quint Kessenich

Statistics	WAKE	SMU
First downs		
Total yards		
Rushing yards		
Passing yards		
Turnovers		
Time of possession		

Team	Category	Player	Statistics
Wake Forest	Passing		
Wake Forest	Rushing		
Wake Forest	Receiving		
SMU	Passing		
SMU	Rushing		
SMU	Receiving		

Wake Forest routed SMU 49–7, effectively ending SMU's chances at making either the ACC Championship or the College Football Playoff. It was the team's first home conference loss since joining the ACC and the team's first double-digit loss at home since losing to Cincinnati 42–13 in 2020.

The game went poorly from SMU right at the start with their first two drives ending in a punt and an interception, respectively. Throughout the rest of the half, SMU committed two turnovers on downs and lost a fumble. Additionally, Wake Forest eviscerated the defense, particularly on the ground, taking a 42–0 lead by the end of the first half, including two dropped interceptions. Despite normally allowing among the fewest third-down conversions of any FBS team, SMU allowed Wake Forest to convert 10 out of 15 attempts this game. Safety Ahmaad Moses was able to return to the team after resolving a dispute over his eligibility, but this made little difference. While both the offense and defense improved in the second half, finally scoring a touchdown and holding Wake Forest to only one of their own, the team's deficit was far too large to recover from.

=== at No. 6 Notre Dame ===
SMU Mustangs (7–3) at No. 6 Notre Dame Fighting Irish (9–1) – Game summary

Quarter	1	2	3	4	Total
Mustangs	0	0	0	0	0
No. 6 Fighting Irish	0	0	0	0	0

at Notre Dame Stadium • Notre Dame, Indiana

- Date: November 21
- Game time: 6:30 p.m. CST / 7:30 p.m. EST
- TV announcers (NBC): Noah Eagle, Todd Blackledge, and Kathryn Tappen

Game information

First quarter
Second quarter
Third quarter
Fourth quarter

Statistics	SMU	ND
First downs		
Total yards		
Rushing yards		
Passing yards		
Passing: comp–att–int		
Turnovers		
Time of possession		

Team	Category	Player	Statistics
SMU	Passing		
SMU	Rushing		
SMU	Receiving		
Notre Dame	Passing		
Notre Dame	Rushing		
Notre Dame	Receiving		

=== at Stanford ===
SMU Mustangs (7–4) at Stanford Cardinal (6–5) – Game summary

Quarter	1	2	3	4	Total
Mustangs	0	0	0	0	0
Stanford	0	0	0	0	0

at Stanford Stadium • Stanford, California

- Date: November 28

Statistics	SMU	STAN
First downs		
Total yards		
Rushing yards		
Passing yards		
Turnovers		
Time of possession		

Team	Category	Player	Statistics
SMU	Passing		
SMU	Rushing		
SMU	Receiving		
Stanford	Passing		
Stanford	Rushing		
Stanford	Receiving		
