= 2024 SMU Mustangs football team =

American college football season

2024 SMU Mustangs football
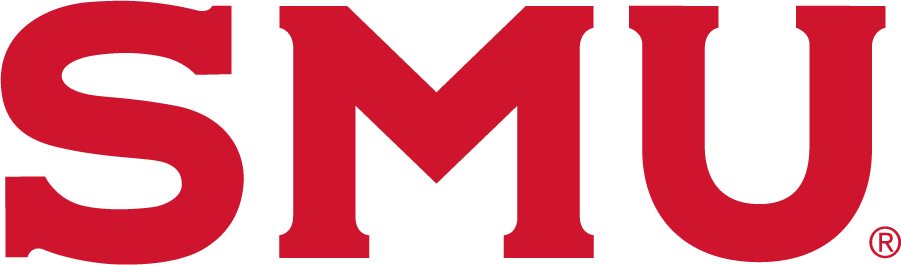

ACC Championship Game, L 31–34 vs. Clemson

CFP First Round, L 10–38 at Penn State
- Conference: Atlantic Coast Conference

Ranking
- Coaches: No. 11т
- AP: No. 12
- Record: 11–3 (8–0 ACC)
- Head coach: Rhett Lashlee (3rd season)
- Offensive coordinator: Casey Woods (3rd season)
- Co-offensive coordinators: Rob Likens (2nd season); Garin Justice (1st season)
- Offensive scheme: Bear raid
- Defensive coordinator: Scott Symons (3rd season)
- Co-defensive coordinators: Maurice Crum Jr. (1st season); Rickey Hunley Jr. (1st season)
- Base defense: 4–2–5
- Home stadium: Gerald J. Ford Stadium

Uniform
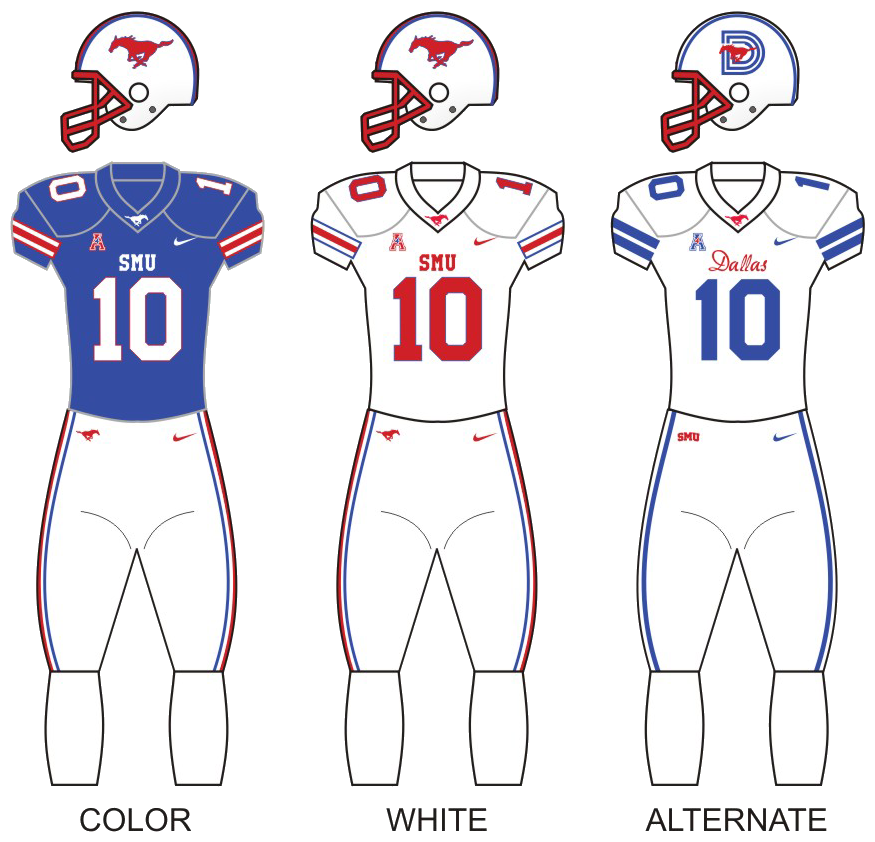

2024 Atlantic Coast Conference football standings
	Conf.			Overall
Team	W		L	W		L
No. 12 SMU y^	8	–	0	11	–	3
No. 14 Clemson y$^	7	–	1	10	–	4
No. 18 Miami (FL)	6	–	2	10	–	3
No. 20 Syracuse	5	–	3	10	–	3
Duke	5	–	3	9	–	4
Louisville	5	–	3	9	–	4
Georgia Tech	5	–	3	7	–	6
Boston College	4	–	4	7	–	6
Virginia Tech	4	–	4	6	–	7
Pittsburgh	3	–	5	7	–	6
NC State	3	–	5	6	–	7
North Carolina	3	–	5	6	–	7
Virginia	3	–	5	5	–	7
California	2	–	6	6	–	7
Wake Forest	2	–	6	4	–	8
Stanford	2	–	6	3	–	9
Florida State	1	–	7	2	–	10
Championship: Clemson 34, SMU 31
^ – College Football Playoff participant; $ – Conference champion; y – Championship game participant; Rankings from AP Poll

The 2024 SMU Mustangs football team represented Southern Methodist University (SMU) in the Atlantic Coast Conference (ACC) during the 2024 NCAA Division I FBS football season. The Mustangs were led by Rhett Lashlee in his third year as the program's head coach. The Mustangs played their home games at Gerald J. Ford Stadium in University Park, Texas.

The 2024 season was SMU's first in the ACC since moving from the American Athletic Conference (The American). The Mustangs clinched a berth in the 2024 ACC Championship Game with a 33–7 win over Virginia, becoming the first team transitioning to a power conference to reach a conference championship game in the national championship game era (since 1998). The Mustangs lost the conference championship game to Clemson, but still secured a berth in the 12-team College Football Playoff (CFP). In their CFP first-round game, SMU was defeated by Penn State, ending their season with an overall 11–3 record.

== Offseason ==
=== Transfers ===
Incoming

Name	Pos.	Height	Weight	Hometown	Prev. school
Tarian Lee Jr.	LB	6'2	240	Tallahassee, FL	Georgia Southern
Brock O'Quinn	LS	6'1	210	Southlake, TX	Alabama
Andrew Chamblee	OT	6'6	304	Maumelle, AR	Arkansas
Paris Patterson Jr.	IOL	6'6	352	East Saint Louis, IL	Arkansas
Billy Walton III	EDGE	6'3	229	Dallas, TX	Texas
Jaden Milliner-Jones	S	5'11	198	DeSoto, TX	Colorado
Jared Harrison-Hunte	DL	6'4	285	Middle Village, NY	Miami (FL)
Qae'Shon Sapp	IOL	6'4	318	Leesburg, GA	East Carolina
Matthew Hibner	TE	6'5	254	Burke, VA	Michigan
Blake Burris	DL	6'5	300	Irving, TX	Texas Tech
Brashard Smith	WR	5'10	194	Miami, FL	Miami (FL)
Anthony Booker Jr.	DL	6'4	351	Cincinnati, OH	Arkansas
Deuce Harmon	CB	5'10	191	Denton, TX	Texas A&M
Ashton Cozart	WR	6'3	195	Flower Mound, TX	Oregon
Justin Medlock	LB	6'0	220	Manvel, TX	Utah
Omari Abor	EDGE	6'3	258	Duncanville, TX	Ohio State
Savion Byrd	OT	6'5	296	Duncanville, TX	Oklahoma
Nate Anderson	IOL	6'4	309	Frisco, TX	Oklahoma
Mike Lockhart	DL	6'3	308	Birmingham, AL	West Virginia
Jahfari Harvey	EDGE	6'4	252	Fort Pierce, FL	Miami (FL)
Jonathan Jefferson	DL	6'3	295	Douglasville, GA	Georgia

=== Recruiting ===
College recruiting
Name	Hometown	School	Height	Weight	Commit date
Tyler Aronson; Quarterback	Vero Beach, FL	Vero Beach High School	6 ft 1 in (1.85 m)	202 lb (92 kg)	Jul 29, 2022
Tyler Aronson; Quarterback	Recruit ratings: Scout: Rivals: 247Sports: ESPN:				
Graham Uter; Offensive line	Daphne, AL	Bayside Academy	6 ft 5 in (1.96 m)	288 lb (131 kg)	Jun 17, 2023
Graham Uter; Offensive line	Recruit ratings: Scout: Rivals: 247Sports: ESPN:				
King Large; Offensive line	Bellflower, CA	St. John Bosco High School	6 ft 4 in (1.93 m)	288 lb (131 kg)	Jun 19, 2023
King Large; Offensive line	Recruit ratings: Scout: Rivals: 247Sports: ESPN:				
Alexander Rodgers; Defensive back	Cedar Hill, TX	Cedar Hill High School	5 ft 11 in (1.80 m)	175 lb (79 kg)	Jun 26, 2023
Alexander Rodgers; Defensive back	Recruit ratings: Scout: Rivals: 247Sports: ESPN:				
Zach Smith; Linebacker	Red Oak, TX	Red Oak High School	6 ft 1 in (1.85 m)	200 lb (91 kg)	Jun 30, 2023
Zach Smith; Linebacker	Recruit ratings: Scout: Rivals: 247Sports: ESPN:				
Ka'Davion Dotson-Walker; Safety	Duncanville, TX	Duncanville High School	5 ft 11 in (1.80 m)	185 lb (84 kg)	Jul 23, 2023
Ka'Davion Dotson-Walker; Safety	Recruit ratings: Scout: Rivals: 247Sports: ESPN:				
Jaylen Moses; Safety	Carrollton, TX	Newman Smith High School	5 ft 10 in (1.78 m)	160 lb (73 kg)	Jul 27, 2023
Jaylen Moses; Safety	Recruit ratings: Scout: Rivals: 247Sports: ESPN:				
Brandon Booker; Linebacker	DeSoto, TX	DeSoto High School	6 ft 1 in (1.85 m)	185 lb (84 kg)	Sep 19, 2023
Brandon Booker; Linebacker	Recruit ratings: Scout: Rivals: 247Sports: ESPN:				
Derrick McFall; Running back	Tyler, TX	John Tyler High School	5 ft 10 in (1.78 m)	180 lb (82 kg)	Nov 27, 2023
Derrick McFall; Running back	Recruit ratings: Scout: Rivals: 247Sports: ESPN:				
William Nettles; Defensive back	Mesquite, TX	Dallas Christian School	6 ft 1 in (1.85 m)	185 lb (84 kg)	Dec 1, 2023
William Nettles; Defensive back	Recruit ratings: Scout: Rivals: 247Sports: ESPN:				

== Preseason ==
=== ACC media poll ===
The Atlantic Coast Conference preseason poll was released on July 31. The Mustangs were predicted to finish seventh in the conference.

== Schedule ==
Date	Time	Opponent	Rank	Site	TV	Result	Attendance
August 24	7:00 p.m.	at Nevada*		Mackay Stadium; Reno, NV	CBSSN	W 29–24	20,263
August 31	7:00 p.m.	Houston Christian*		Gerald J. Ford Stadium; University Park, TX	ACCNX/ESPN+	W 59–7	27,080
September 6	6:00 p.m.	BYU*		Gerald J. Ford Stadium; University Park, TX	ESPN2	L 15–18	31,172
September 21	4:00 p.m.	TCU*		Gerald J. Ford Stadium; University Park, TX (Iron Skillet)	The CW	W 66–42	33,168
September 28	7:00 p.m.	Florida State		Gerald J. Ford Stadium; University Park, TX	ACCN	W 42–16	34,879
October 5	11:00 a.m.	at No. 22 Louisville		L&N Federal Credit Union Stadium; Louisville, KY	ESPN	W 34–27	50,254
October 19	7:00 p.m.	at Stanford	No. 21	Stanford Stadium; Stanford, CA	ACCN	W 40–10	19,117
October 26	7:00 p.m.	at Duke	No. 22	Wallace Wade Stadium; Durham, NC	ACCN	W 28–27 ^{OT}	30,241
November 2	7:00 p.m.	No. 18 Pittsburgh^{†}	No. 20	Gerald J. Ford Stadium; University Park, TX	ACCN	W 48–25	34,648
November 16	2:30 p.m.	Boston College	No. 14	Gerald J. Ford Stadium; University Park, TX	ESPN	W 38–28	34,438
November 23	11:00 a.m.	at Virginia	No. 13	Scott Stadium; Charlottesville, VA	ESPN2	W 33–7	36,305
November 30	2:30 p.m.	California	No. 9	Gerald J. Ford Stadium; University Park, TX	ESPN2	W 38–6	33,178
December 7	7:00 p.m.	vs. No. 17 Clemson	No. 8	Bank of America Stadium; Charlotte, NC (ACC Championship Game)	ABC	L 31–34	53,808
December 21	11:00 a.m.	at (6) No. 4 Penn State*	(11) No. 10	Beaver Stadium; State College, PA (CFP First Round)	TNT	L 10–38	106,013
*Non-conference game; ^{†}Homecoming; Rankings from AP Poll (and CFP Rankings, after November 5) - Released prior to game; All times are in Central time

== Rankings ==
Ranking movements Legend: ██ Increase in ranking ██ Decrease in ranking — = Not ranked RV = Received votes т = Tied with team above or below
	Week																
Poll	Pre	1	2	3	4	5	6	7	8	9	10	11	12	13	14	15	Final
AP	RV	RV	—	—	RV	RV	25	21	22	20	13	14	13	9	8	12	12
Coaches	RV	RV	—	—	RV	RV	25	23	22	20	15	13т	12	9	7	12	11т
CFP	Not released										13	14	13	9	8	10	Not released

== Personnel ==
2024 SMU Mustangs football team roster
Players
Coaches
Offense

Pos.	#	Name	Class
RB	0	Camar Wheaton	Jr
RB	1	Brashard Smith	Sr
QB	2	Preston Stone (C)	Jr
WR	3	Romello Brinson	Sr
RB	4	Jaylan Knighton	Sr
WR	5	Moochie Dixon	Sr
QB	6	Keldric Luster	Fr
QB	7	Kevin Jennings (C)	So
WR	8	Jordan Hudson	Jr
WR	9	Key'Shawn Smith	Sr
WR	10	Jamarion Carroll	Fr
RB	11	L. J. Johnson Jr.	Jr
WR	12	Jake Bailey	GS
WR	13	Roderick Daniels Jr.	Sr
QB	14	Tyler Aronson	Fr
WR	15	Jaxson Lavender	Fr
WR	16	Ashton Cozart	Fr
WR	18	Randy Reece	Fr
WR, RB	20	Derrick McFall	Fr
QB	25	William Fierro	Fr
RB	27	Zane Minors	Jr
QB	28	Charlie Fiser	So
RB	29	Zach Hernandez	Fr
WR	30	Carter Campbell	GS
WR	32	Joey Bruszer	So
WR	33	Meyer Pereira	Fr
WR	34	Lance Beeghley	Fr
WR	35	Henry Stickler	Fr
WR	36	Cooper Reed	Fr
WR	39	Keaton Cheves	So
TE	42	Will Locke	Fr
TE	45	Stone Eby	Jr
TE	46	Markus Schumacher	So
OL	50	Graham Uter	Fr
OL	51	Justin Osborne (C)	GS
OL	53	Jakai Clark	GS
OL	54	Savion Byrd	Jr
OL	55	Qae'Shon Sapp	So
OL	57	Henry Douglass	Fr
OL	59	P. J. Williams	So
OL	60	Hunter Ryan	So
OL	65	Jack Laphen	So
OL	66	Max Yao	Jr
OL	68	King Large	Fr
OL	69	Nate Anderson	Jr
OL	70	Paxton Briggle	Fr
OL	71	Logan Parr	GS
OL	72	Caleb Johnson	Jr
OL	74	Andrew Chamblee	So
OL	75	Ben Sparks	Sr
OL	76	Keaton Schultz	Jr
OL	77	Alex Woods	Fr
OL	78	Paris Patterson Jr.	Fr
OL	79	Reagan Gill	Fr
WR	81	Jake Peveto	Fr
TE	82	R. J. Maryland	Jr
WR	83	Case Holleron	Fr
TE	84	Tripp Riordan	Fr
TE	85	Adam Moore	So
TE	86	Davis Hawkins	Jr
TE	88	Matthew Hibner	GS

Defense

Pos.	#	Name	Class
CB	0	William Nettles	Fr
CB	1	Brandon Crossley	GS
S	2	Jonathan McGill (C)	GS
S	3	Ahmaad Moses	Jr
CB	4	Jahari Rogers	Sr
DE	5	Elijah Roberts (C)	Sr
DE	6	Jahfari Harvey	Sr
CB	7	Deuce Harmon	Jr
LB	8	Justin Medlock	Jr
DT	9	Mike Lockhart	GS
DT	10	Anthony Booker Jr.	GS
S	11	Jaden Milliner-Jones	So
CB	13	Jaelyn Davis-Robinson	So
CB	14	A. J. Davis	So
DE	15	Cameron Robertson	Jr
DE	16	David Abiara	Jr
CB	18	Alexander Rodgers	Fr
LB	20	Zach Smith	Fr
CB	21	Kyron Chambers	So
S	22	Cole Sanders Jr.	Sr
S	23	Isaiah Nwokobia	Jr
LB	24	Kobe Wilson (C)	GS
S	25	Davaughn Celestine	GS
S	26	Jaylen Moses	Fr
S	27	Abdul Muhammad	Fr
LB	28	Brandon Booker	Fr
LB	29	Brandon Miyazono	So
DE	30	Omari Abor	So
DE	32	Billy Walton III	Fr
CB	33	Michael De Hoyos	So
LB	34	Ahmad Walker	Sr
CB	35	Dante Wesley II	Fr
DE	36	Braeden Flowers	Fr
S	38	Jake Ballard	Fr
LB	40	Tarian Lee Jr.	GS
LB	42	I. V. Webb	Fr
LB	45	Cyrus Aboud	Fr
LB	46	Xavier Wright	Fr
S	47	Alex Ditsch	Fr
DL	51	Javier Brito	Fr
LB	52	Sean Kane	Fr
LB	54	Alexander Kilgore	So
DE	58	Isaiah Smith	Jr
DL	81	Jared Harrison-Hunte	Sr
DT	91	Blake Burris	GS
DT	92	Kori Roberson Jr.	GS
DT	93	Kevin Allen	Fr
DT	94	Jonathan Jefferson	GS
DE	95	Matt Baer	So
DL	96	Christian de Moor	Fr
DT	98	Mike Yoan Sandjo-Njiki	Sr

Special teams

Pos.	#	Name	Class
LS	40	Cameron McCulloch	Fr
K	41	Collin Rogers	Jr
P	43	Wade McSparron	Fr
LS	48	Will Benton IV	GS
P	49	Isaac Pearson	GS
LS	56	Brock O'Quinn	Fr
P	92	Patrick Hellen	Fr
P	94	Michael Tadros	So
K	95	Sam Keltner	Fr
K	96	Jackson Waller	Fr
K	97	Gabriel Lozano	GS

Head coach

- Rhett Lashlee

Coordinators/assistant coaches

- Rob Likens
  Associate head coach/Co-offensive coordinator/Wide receivers
- Casey Woods
  Offensive coordinator/Tight ends
- Garin Justice
  Co-offensive coordinator/Offensive line
- Scott Symons
  Defensive coordinator/Safeties
- Maurice Crum Jr.
  Co-defensive coordinator/Linebackers
- Rickey Hunley Jr.
  Co-defensive coordinator/Cornerbacks
- Kyle Cooper
  Special teams coordinator/Running backs
- Calvin Thibodeaux
  Defensive line
- D'Eriq King
  Quarterbacks
- Sam Dunnam
  Edges

Legend

- (C) Team captain
- (S) Suspended
- (I) Ineligible
- Injured
- Redshirt

Roster
Last update: August 24, 2024

== Game summaries ==
=== At Nevada ===
SMU Mustangs at Nevada Wolf Pack – Game summary

Quarter	1	2	3	4	Total
Mustangs	0	10	3	16	29
Wolf Pack	7	10	7	0	24

at Mackay Stadium, Reno, Nevada

- Date: August 24
- Game time: 7:00 p.m. CDT/5:00 p.m. PDT
- Game weather: Cloudy, 56 °F (13 °C)
- Game attendance: 20,263
- Referee: Adam Savoie
- TV announcers (CBSSN): Rich Waltz, Robert Turbin, and Amanda Guerra
- Box score, Recap

Game information
First quarter
- NEV – Jace Henry 5-yard pass from Brendon Lewis (Matthew Killam kick), 1:07. Wolf Pack 7–0. Drive: 3 plays, 9 yards, 1:18.

Second quarter

- SMU – L. J. Johnson Jr. 1-yard run (Collin Rogers kick), 12:57. Tied 7–7. Drive: 7 plays, 51 yards, 3:00.
- NEV – Matthew Killam 36-yard field goal, 8:38. Wolf Pack 10–7. Drive: 8 plays, 57 yards, 4:19.
- SMU – Collin Rogers 52-yard field goal, 4:12. Tied 10–10. Drive: 5 plays, 21 yards, 1:35.
- NEV – Cortez Braham Jr. 10-yard pass from Brendon Lewis (Matthew Killam kick), 0:09. Wolf Pack 17–10. Drive: 10 plays, 81 yards, 3:57.

Third quarter

- SMU – Collin Rogers 43-yard field goal, 12:18. Wolf Pack 17–13. Drive: 9 plays, 49 yards, 2:42.
- NEV – Savion Red 1-yard run (Matthew Killam kick), 3:23. Wolf Pack 24–13. Drive: 15 plays, 83 yards, 8:50.

Fourth quarter

- SMU – Brashard Smith 4-yard run (L. J. Johnson Jr. run), 8:01. Wolf Pack 24–21. Drive: 8 plays, 98 yards, 2:12.
- SMU – Savion Red tackled in own end zone, 7:19. Wolf Pack 24–23.
- SMU – R. J. Maryland 34-yard pass from Preston Stone (pass failed), 1:18. Mustangs 29–24. Drive: 9 plays, 83 yards, 2:13.

Statistics	SMU	NEV
First downs	21	16
Total yards	408	298
Rushing yards	100	148
Passing yards	308	150
Turnovers	1	0
Time of possession	23:43	36:17

Team	Category	Player	Statistics
SMU	Passing	Preston Stone	17/30, 254 yards, TD, INT
SMU	Rushing	Brashard Smith	11 rushes, 67 yards, TD
SMU	Receiving	R. J. Maryland	8 receptions, 162 yards, TD
Nevada	Passing	Brendon Lewis	14/26, 132 yards, 2 TD
Nevada	Rushing	Brendon Lewis	18 rushes, 77 yards
Nevada	Receiving	Cortez Braham Jr.	4 receptions, 66 yards, TD

=== Houston Christian ===
Houston Christian Huskies at SMU Mustangs – Game summary

Quarter	1	2	3	4	Total
Huskies	0	7	0	0	7
Mustangs	28	14	7	10	59

at Gerald J. Ford Stadium, University Park, Texas

- Date: August 31
- Game time: 7:00 p.m. CDT
- Game weather: Sunny, 91 °F (33 °C)
- Game attendance: 27,080
- Referee: Nate Blake
- TV announcers (ACCNX/ESPN+): Doug Sherman, Tyoka Jackson, and Marilyn Payne
- Box score, Recap

Game information
First quarter
- SMU – Jordan Hudson 28-yard pass from Preston Stone (pass failed), 10:47. Mustangs 6–0. Drive: 4 plays, 84 yards, 1:20.
- SMU – Brashard Smith 1-yard run (Collin Rogers kick), 7:07. Mustangs 13–0. Drive: 7 plays, 59 yards, 3:05.
- SMU – Brashard Smith 2-yard run (Collin Rogers kick), 3:04. Mustangs 20–0. Drive: 6 plays, 55 yards, 1:58.
- SMU – Anthony Booker Jr. 16-yard fumble return (L. J. Johnson Jr. run), 2:03. Mustangs 28–0.

Second quarter

- SMU – Jake Bailey 4-yard pass from Preston Stone (Collin Rogers kick), 13:42. Mustangs 35–0. Drive: 5 plays, 80 yards, 1:50.
- HCU – Deuce McMillan 10-yard pass from Cutter Stewart (Dillon Fedor kick), 12:19. Mustangs 35–7. Drive: 4 plays, 50 yards, 1:23.
- SMU – Key'Shawn Smith 35-yard pass from Kevin Jennings (Collin Rogers kick), 5:05. Mustangs 42–7. Drive: 4 plays, 42 yards, 1:28.

Third quarter

- SMU – Derrick McFall 17-yard run (Gabriel Lorenzo kick), 7:35. Mustangs 49–7. Drive: 9 plays, 85 yards, 3:58.

Fourth quarter

- SMU – Kevin Jennings 6-yard run (Gabriel Lorenzo kick), 14:48. Mustangs 56–7. Drive: 11 plays, 64 yards, 4:24.
- SMU – Collin Rogers 23-yard field goal, 1:54. Mustangs 59–7. Drive: 16 plays, 69 yards, 10:50.

Statistics	HCU	SMU
First downs	10	28
Total yards	157	595
Rushing yards	34	369
Passing yards	123	226
Turnovers	3	1
Time of possession	24:56	35:04

Team	Category	Player	Statistics
Houston Christian	Passing	Cutter Stewart	10/25, 118 yards, TD, 2 INT
Houston Christian	Rushing	Champ Dozier	7 rushes, 22 yards
Houston Christian	Receiving	Ismael Fuller	2 receptions, 38 yards
SMU	Passing	Kevin Jennings	10/14, 148 yards, TD
SMU	Rushing	Brashard Smith	9 rushes, 108 yards, 2 TD
SMU	Receiving	Jake Bailey	4 receptions, 59 yards, TD

SMU handily defeated HCU, a team in the Football Championship Subdivision, 59–7 in the team's home opener. This was the first game played in Gerald J. Ford Stadium following the completion of the Garry Weber Endzone Complex.

=== BYU ===
BYU Cougars at SMU Mustangs – Game summary

Quarter	1	2	3	4	Total
Cougars	7	0	8	3	18
Mustangs	0	9	3	3	15

at Gerald J. Ford Stadium, University Park, Texas

- Date: September 6
- Game time: 6:00 p.m. CDT
- Game weather: Cloudy, 86 °F (30 °C)
- Game attendance: 31,172
- Referee: Cravonne Barrett
- TV announcers (ESPN2): Anish Shroff, Andre Ware, and Paul Carcaterra
- Box score, Recap

Game information
First quarter
- BYU – Mata'ava Ta'ase 16-yard pass from Jake Retzlaff (Will Ferrin kick), 7:16. Cougars 7–0. Drive: 8 plays, 75 yards, 3:23.

Second quarter

- SMU – Collin Rogers 53-yard field goal, 13:06. Cougars 7–3. Drive: 5 plays, 16 yards, 1:46.
- SMU – Collin Rogers 52-yard field goal, 6:03. Cougars 7–6. Drive: 10 plays, 36 yards, 3:26.
- SMU – Collin Rogers 38-yard field goal, 0:42. Mustangs 9–7. Drive: 9 plays, 50 yards, 2:04.

Third quarter

- SMU – Collin Rogers 28-yard field goal, 9:28. Mustangs 12–7. Drive: 11 plays, 24 yards, 4:13.
- BYU – Enoch Nawahine 9-yard run (Jake Retzlaff pass to Keanu Hill), 1:15. Cougars 15–12. Drive: 7 plays, 61 yards, 4:19.

Fourth quarter

- SMU – Collin Rogers 45-yard field goal, 6:17. Tied 15–15. Drive: 6 plays, 17 yards, 2:51.
- BYU – Will Ferrin 26-yard field goal, 1:58. Cougars 18–15. Drive: 9 plays, 67 yards, 4:19.

Statistics	BYU	SMU
First downs	16	18
Total yards	336	261
Rushing yards	134	117
Passing yards	202	144
Turnovers	3	3
Time of possession	30:53	29:07

Team	Category	Player	Statistics
BYU	Passing	Jake Retzlaff	15/28, 202 yards, TD, 2 INT
BYU	Rushing	Miles Davis	3 rushes, 37 yards
BYU	Receiving	Darius Lassiter	2 receptions, 62 yards
SMU	Passing	Kevin Jennings	15/32, 140 yards, INT
SMU	Rushing	Brashard Smith	14 rushes, 75 yards
SMU	Receiving	Key'Shawn Smith	4 receptions, 46 yards

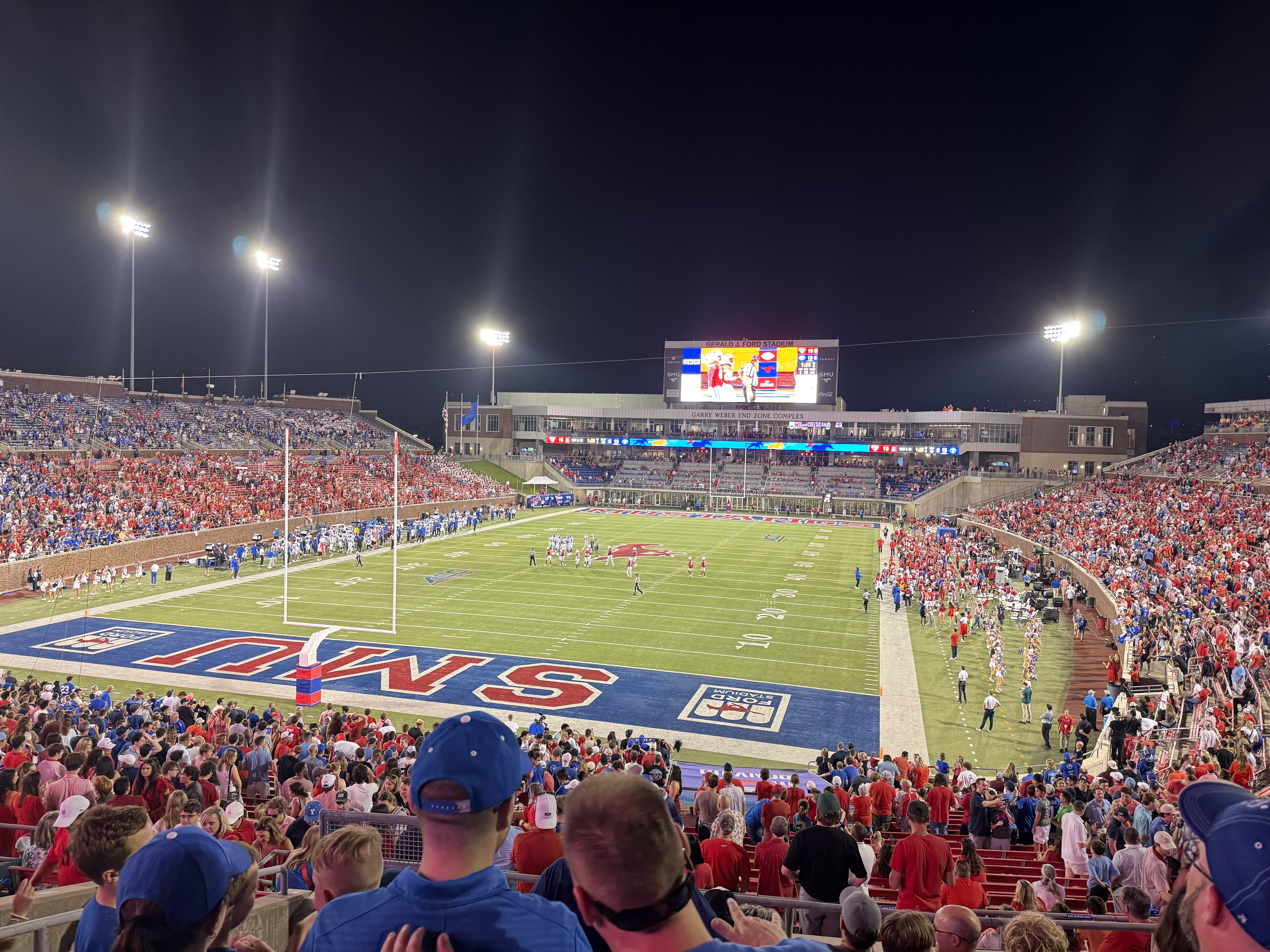
Ford Stadium during the game against BYU, showcasing the new Gary Weber Endzone Complex

SMU lost to BYU 18–15 in a defense-heavy game. Preston Stone started as quarterback for SMU, but was replaced by backup Kevin Jennings three drives into the game. Neither quarterback led the team to a touchdown, with placekicker Collin Rogers instead kicking 5 field goals to score all 15 of the team's points, setting a school record for most field goals in a single game in the process.

=== TCU (rivalry) ===
TCU Horned Frogs at SMU Mustangs – Game summary

Quarter	1	2	3	4	Total
Horned Frogs	0	21	7	14	42
Mustangs	17	24	18	7	66

at Gerald J. Ford Stadium, University Park, Texas

- Date: September 21
- Game time: 4:00 p.m. CDT
- Game weather: Sunny, 96 °F (36 °C)
- Game attendance: 33,168
- Referee: Kevin Boitmann
- TV announcers (The CW): Thom Brennaman, Max Browne, and Treavor Scales
- Box score, Recap

Game information
First quarter
- SMU – Collin Rogers 51-yard field goal, 9:52. Mustangs 3–0. Drive: 11 plays, 41 yards, 5:08.
- SMU – Brandon Crossley 51-yard fumble return (Collin Rogers kick), 7:02. Mustangs 10–0.
- SMU – Roderick Daniels Jr. 69-yard punt return (Collin Rogers kick), 6:10. Mustangs 17–0.

Second quarter

- TCU – Josh Hoover 1-yard run (Kyle Lemmermann kick), 14:51. Mustangs 17–7. Drive: 14 plays, 65 yards, 6:19.
- TCU – Cam Cook 7-yard run (Kyle Lemmermann kick), 11:24. Mustangs 17–14. Drive: 6 plays, 32 yards, 2:11.
- SMU – Brashard Smith 25-yard run (Collin Rogers kick), 8:01. Mustangs 24–14. Drive: 8 plays, 68 yards, 3:19.
- TCU – Eric McAlister 19-yard pass from Josh Hoover (Kyle Lemmermann kick), 5:00. Mustangs 24–21. Drive: 7 plays, 75 yards, 3:01.
- SMU – Jordan Hudson 10-yard pass from Kevin Jennings (Collin Rogers kick), 1:28. Mustangs 31–21. Drive: 11 plays, 60 yards, 3:24.
- SMU – Ahmaad Moses 60-yard interception return (Collin Rogers kick), 1:04. Mustangs 38–21.
- SMU – Collin Rogers 49-yard field goal, 0:00. Mustangs 41–21. Drive: 3 plays, 31 yards, 0:13.

Third quarter

- TCU – Jack Bech 46-yard pass from Josh Hoover (Kyle Lemmermann kick), 11:18. Mustangs 41–28. Drive: 7 plays, 90 yards, 3:29.
- SMU – Brashard Smith 24-yard pass from Kevin Jennings (Kevin Jennings pass to Brashard Smith), 9:27. Mustangs 49–28. Drive: 4 plays, 75 yards, 1:51.
- SMU – Brashard Smith 1-yard run (Collin Rogers kick), 8:34. Mustangs 56–28. Drive: 1 play, 1 yard, 0:04.
- SMU – Collin Rogers 45-yard field goal, 1:35. Mustangs 59–28. Drive: 9 plays, 47 yards, 3:52.

Fourth quarter

- TCU – Jack Bech 15-yard pass from Josh Hoover (Kyle Lemmermann kick), 12:15. Mustangs 59–35. Drive: 5 plays, 64 yards, 1:17.
- SMU – Brashard Smith 1-yard run (Collin Rogers kick), 8:23. Mustangs 66–35. Drive: 6 plays, 53 yards, 3:50.
- TCU – Jordyn Bailey 6-yard pass from Ken Seals (Kyle Lemmermann kick), 2:55. Mustangs 66–42. Drive: 10 plays, 59 yards, 5:21.

Statistics	TCU	SMU
First downs	24	23
Total yards	480	375
Rushing yards	65	238
Passing yards	415	137
Turnovers	5	1
Time of possession	32:20	27:40

Team	Category	Player	Statistics
TCU	Passing	Josh Hoover	28/43, 396 yards, 3 TD, 2 INT
TCU	Rushing	Cam Cook	14 rushes, 24 yards, TD
TCU	Receiving	Jack Bech	8 receptions, 166 yards, 2 TD
SMU	Passing	Kevin Jennings	14/19, 137 yards, 2 TD
SMU	Rushing	Brashard Smith	18 rushes, 127 yards, 3 TD
SMU	Receiving	Romello Brinson	1 reception, 51 yards

SMU defeated TCU 66–42 to win back the Iron Skillet. Prior to the game, Kevin Jennings took over the role as starting quarterback from Preston Stone. The team capitalized on a strong defense, which forced five turnovers, two of which were immediately returned for touchdowns. The team additionally scored a touchdown on a punt return. At the beginning of the second half, TCU head coach Sonny Dykes, who was SMU's head coach from 2018–2021, was ejected from the stadium after receiving two consecutive penalties for unsportsmanlike conduct. Dykes had been arguing with officials over a holding penalty that resulted in a kickoff return touchdown being called back. Dykes was the first head coach of a team in a power conference to be disqualified from a game for this reason since the rule was established in 2016.

=== Florida State ===
Florida State Seminoles at SMU Mustangs – Game summary

Quarter	1	2	3	4	Total
Seminoles	7	2	7	0	16
Mustangs	7	7	14	14	42

at Gerald J. Ford Stadium, University Park, Texas

- Date: September 28
- Game time: 7:00 p.m. CDT
- Game weather: Clear, 85 °F (29 °C)
- Game attendance: 34,879
- Referee: Michael Griffith
- TV announcers (ACCN): Wes Durham, Tom Luginbill, and Dana Boyle
- Box score, Recap

Game information
First quarter
- SMU – Brashard Smith 13-yard run (Collin Rogers kick), 9:44. Mustangs 7–0. Drive: 11 plays, 75 yards, 5:16.
- FSU – Kentron Poitier 9-yard pass from DJ Uiagalelei (Ryan Fitzgerald kick), 6:38. Tied 7–7. Drive: 7 plays, 75 yards, 3:06.

Second quarter

- SMU – Jordan Hudson 42-yard pass from Kevin Jennings (Collin Rogers kick), 10:20. Mustangs 14–7. Drive: 6 plays, 68 yards, 1:35.
- FSU – Isaac Pearson punt blocked out of own end zone, 0:22. Mustangs 14–9.

Third quarter

- SMU – R. J. Maryland 11-yard pass from Kevin Jennings (Collin Rogers kick), 13:00. Mustangs 21–9. Drive: 3 plays, 11 yards, 1:10.
- SMU – R. J. Maryland 15-yard pass from Kevin Jennings (Collin Rogers kick), 7:42. Mustangs 28–9. Drive: 6 plays, 73 yards, 3:04.
- FSU – Landen Thomas 20-yard pass from DJ Uiagalelei (Ryan Fitzgerald kick), 4:45. Mustangs 28–16. Drive: 8 plays, 75 yards, 2:57.

Fourth quarter

- SMU – Roderick Daniels Jr. 2-yard run (Collin Rogers kick), 14:23. Mustangs 35–16. Drive: 11 plays, 75 yards, 5:22.
- SMU – Kobe Wilson 82-yard interception return (Collin Rogers kick), 12:55. Mustangs 42–16.

Statistics	FSU	SMU
First downs	13	23
Total yards	295	480
Rushing yards	73	226
Passing yards	222	254
Turnovers	3	1
Time of possession	24:19	35:41

Team	Category	Player	Statistics
Florida State	Passing	DJ Uiagalelei	12/30, 222 yards, 2 TD, 3 INT
Florida State	Rushing	Lawrance Toafili	15 rushes, 67 yards
Florida State	Receiving	Jakhi Douglas	2 receptions, 61 yards
SMU	Passing	Kevin Jennings	16/23, 254 yards, 3 TD
SMU	Rushing	Brashard Smith	17 rushes, 129 yards, TD
SMU	Receiving	Jake Bailey	2 receptions, 65 yards

=== At No. 22 Louisville ===
SMU Mustangs at No. 22 Louisville Cardinals – Game summary

Quarter	1	2	3	4	Total
Mustangs	14	10	3	7	34
No. 22 Cardinals	10	3	14	0	27

at L&N Federal Credit Union Stadium, Louisville, Kentucky

- Date: October 5
- Game time: 11:00 a.m. CDT/12:00 p.m. EDT
- Game weather: Sunny, 76 °F (24 °C)
- Game attendance: 50,254
- Referee: Justin Elliott
- TV announcers (ESPN): Bob Wischusen, Louis Riddick, and Kris Budden
- Box score, Recap

Game information
First quarter
- SMU – Roderick Daniels Jr. 5-yard run (Collin Rogers kick), 11:39. Mustangs 7–0. Drive: 8 plays, 75 yards, 3:21.
- LOU – Ja'Corey Brooks 6-yard pass from Tyler Shough (Brock Travelstead kick), 9:00. Tied 7–7. Drive: 5 plays, 65 yards, 2:39.
- SMU – Key'Shawn Smith 10-yard pass from Preston Stone (Collin Rogers kick), 6:24. Mustangs 14–7. Drive: 6 plays, 75 yards, 2:36.
- LOU – Brock Travelstead 46-yard field goal, 2:51. Mustangs 14–10. Drive: 8 plays, 46 yards, 3:27.

Second quarter

- SMU – Kevin Jennings 59-yard run (Collin Rogers kick), 6:51. Mustangs 21–10. Drive: 5 plays, 78 yards, 2:15.
- LOU – Brock Travelstead 41-yard field goal, 2:23. Mustangs 21–13. Drive: 10 plays, 36 yards, 4:17.
- SMU – Collin Rogers 55-yard field goal, 0:17. Mustangs 24–13. Drive: 10 plays, 37 yards, 2:06.

Third quarter

- LOU – Donald Chaney 1-yard run (Brock Travelstead kick), 9:56. Mustangs 24–20. Drive: 8 plays, 78 yards, 4:56.
- SMU – Collin Rogers 43-yard field goal, 7:19. Mustangs 27–20. Drive: 6 plays, 49 yards, 2:37.
- LOU – Ja'Corey Brooks 86-yard pass from Tyler Shough (Brock Travelstead kick), 5:40. Tied 27–27. Drive: 3 plays, 90 yards, 1:33.

Fourth quarter

- SMU – L. J. Johnson Jr. 1-yard run (Collin Rogers kick), 6:39. Mustangs 34–27. Drive: 11 plays, 89 yards, 3:23.

Statistics	SMU	LOU
First downs	26	21
Total yards	481	461
Rushing yards	190	132
Passing yards	291	329
Turnovers	0	1
Time of possession	25:37	34:23

Team	Category	Player	Statistics
SMU	Passing	Kevin Jennings	21/27, 281 yards
SMU	Rushing	Kevin Jennings	10 rushes, 113 yards, TD
SMU	Receiving	R. J. Maryland	6 receptions, 83 yards
Louisville	Passing	Tyler Shough	22/35, 329 yards, 2 TD, INT
Louisville	Rushing	Isaac Brown	10 rushes, 117 yards
Louisville	Receiving	Ja'Corey Brooks	3 receptions, 121 yards, 2 TD

SMU defeated Louisville 34–27, their first win against a ranked opponent for the season. Quarterback Kevin Jennings became the first SMU player to pass for over 200 yards and rush for over 100 yards in a game since 2014, including a 59-yard touchdown run. Jennings sustained a minor injury during a drive in the first quarter, forcing backup quarterback Preston Stone to finish the drive, but Jennings returned to the field shortly after. The team took an 11-point lead entering halftime, but Louisville came back to tie the game during the third quarter. SMU's defense prevented Louisville from scoring during the fourth quarter, enabling SMU to take the victory with one final touchdown and an interception by safety Isaiah Nwokobia. Many observers saw SMU's victory as placing them in contention for a spot in the ACC Championship.

=== At Stanford ===
No. 21 SMU Mustangs at Stanford Cardinal – Game summary

Quarter	1	2	3	4	Total
No. 21 Mustangs	21	10	0	9	40
Cardinal	0	7	3	0	10

at Stanford Stadium, Stanford, California

- Date: October 19
- Game time: 7:00 p.m. CDT/5:00 p.m. PDT
- Game weather: Sunny
- Game attendance: 19,117
- Referee: Tim Hedgepeth
- TV announcers (ACCN): Wes Durham, Tom Luginbill, and Dana Boyle
- Box score, Recap

Game information
First quarter
- SMU – Moochie Dixon 87-yard pass from Kevin Jennings (Collin Rogers kick), 14:41. Mustangs 7–0. Drive: 1 play, 87 yards, 0:14.
- SMU – Key'Shawn Smith 45-yard pass from Kevin Jennings (Collin Rogers kick), 4:31. Mustangs 14–0. Drive: 6 plays, 93 yards, 2:03.
- SMU – R. J. Maryland 38-yard pass from Kevin Jennings (Collin Rogers kick), 1:47. Mustangs 21–0. Drive: 2 plays, 55 yards, 0:33.

Second quarter

- STAN – Elic Ayomanor 18-yard pass from Elijah Brown (Emmett Kenney kick), 6:39. Mustangs 21–7. Drive: 3 plays, 14 yards, 1:53.
- SMU – L. J. Johnson Jr. 5-yard run (Collin Rogers kick), 1:51. Mustangs 28–7. Drive: 12 plays, 59 yards, 4:41.
- SMU – Collin Rogers 51-yard field goal, 0:00. Mustangs 31–7. Drive: 6 plays, 46 yards, 1:11.

Third quarter

- STAN – Emmett Kenney 42-yard field goal, 12:54. Mustangs 31–10. Drive: 4 plays, 5 yards, 0:38.

Fourth quarter

- SMU – Cole Sanders Jr. safety, 11:40. Mustangs 33–10.
- SMU – L. J. Johnson Jr. 2-yard run (Collin Rogers kick), 5:03. Mustangs 40–10. Drive: 13 plays, 63 yards, 6:29.

Statistics	SMU	STAN
First downs	22	15
Total yards	501	206
Rushing yards	179	33
Passing yards	322	173
Turnovers	3	2
Time of possession	27:15	32:45

Team	Category	Player	Statistics
SMU	Passing	Kevin Jennings	17/27, 322 yards, 3 TD, INT
SMU	Rushing	Brashard Smith	8 rushes, 67 yards
SMU	Receiving	Moochie Dixon	1 reception, 87 yards, TD
Stanford	Passing	Elijah Brown	16/32, 153 yards, TD, 2 INT
Stanford	Rushing	Micah Ford	13 rushes, 31 yards
Stanford	Receiving	Sam Roush	6 receptions, 75 yards

SMU defeated Stanford 40–10, but star tight end R. J. Maryland was injured after being tackled at the knees during the game. The injury removed Maryland from play for the remainder of the season.

=== At Duke ===
No. 22 SMU Mustangs at Duke Blue Devils – Game summary

Quarter	1	2	3	4	OT	Total
No. 22 Mustangs	0	14	7	0	7	28
Blue Devils	7	0	6	8	6	27

at Wallace Wade Stadium, Durham, North Carolina

- Date: October 26
- Game time: 7:00 p.m. CDT/8:00 p.m. EDT
- Game weather: Sunny
- Game attendance: 30,241
- Referee: Mike Roche
- TV announcers (ACCN): Wes Durham, Tom Luginbill, and Dana Boyle
- Box score, Recap

Game information
First quarter
- DUKE – Que'Sean Brown 43-yard pass from Maalik Murphy (Todd Pelino kick), 2:38. Blue Devils 7–0. Drive: 9 plays, 95 yards, 3:07.

Second quarter

- SMU – Brashard Smith 1-yard run (Collin Rogers kick), 13:15. Tied 7–7. Drive: 12 plays, 75 yards, 4:23.
- SMU – Kevin Jennings 3-yard run (Collin Rogers kick), 3:56. Mustangs 14–7. Drive: 17 plays, 85 yards, 7:02.

Third quarter

- SMU – Roderick Daniels Jr. 81-yard pass from Kevin Jennings (Collin Rogers kick), 4:58. Mustangs 21–7. Drive: 2 plays, 80 yards, 0:42.
- DUKE – Jordan Moore 12-yard pass from Maalik Murphy (kick failed), 2:11. Mustangs 21–13. Drive: 9 plays, 75 yards, 2:47.

Fourth quarter

- DUKE – Star Thomas 1-yard run (Maalik Murphy pass to Eli Pancol), 9:02. Tied 21–21. Drive: 10 plays, 64 yards, 5:46.

Overtime

- SMU – Brashard Smith 24-yard run (Collin Rogers kick). Mustangs 28–21. Drive: 2 plays, 25 yards.
- DUKE – Eli Pancol 25-yard pass from Maalik Murphy (pass failed). Mustangs 28–27. Drive: 1 play, 25 yards.

Statistics	SMU	DUKE
First downs	23	24
Total yards	469	393
Rushing yards	211	98
Passing yards	258	295
Turnovers	6	0
Time of possession	27:28	32:32

Team	Category	Player	Statistics
SMU	Passing	Kevin Jennings	13/24, 258 yards, TD, 3 INT
SMU	Rushing	Brashard Smith	26 rushes, 117 yards, 2 TD
SMU	Receiving	Roderick Daniels Jr.	2 receptions, 153 yards, TD
Duke	Passing	Maalik Murphy	27/48, 295 yards, 3 TD
Duke	Rushing	Star Thomas	17 rushes, 65 yards, TD
Duke	Receiving	Eli Pancol	11 receptions, 138 yards, TD

SMU narrowly defeated Duke in overtime after Duke failed a two-point conversion attempt. Quarterback Kevin Jennings threw three interceptions and turned the ball over on two fumbles. Overall, the Mustangs turned the ball over six times, while Duke did not turn the ball over a single time. Despite this, Duke never scored off of any turnover. SMU became one of only two teams in the twenty first century to win despite committing at least six more turnovers than their opponent. Duke kicker Todd Pelino missed an extra point in the third quarter, although the team made up the points with a two-point conversion in the fourth quarter to tie the game. Pelino missed one field goal during the fourth quarter that would have given Duke the lead, while SMU defensive end Jahfari Harvey blocked another field goal as time expired, sending the game to overtime.

=== No. 18 Pittsburgh ===
No. 18 Pittsburgh Panthers at No. 20 SMU Mustangs – Game summary

Quarter	1	2	3	4	Total
No. 18 Panthers	3	0	8	14	25
No. 20 Mustangs	7	24	3	14	48

at Gerald J. Ford Stadium, University Park, Texas

- Date: November 2
- Game time: 7:00 p.m. CDT
- Game weather: Cloudy, 75 °F (24 °C)
- Game attendance: 36,648
- Referee: Justin Elliott
- TV announcers (ACCN): Wes Durham, Tom Luginbill, and Dana Boyle
- Box score, Recap

Game information
First quarter
- SMU – L. J. Johnson Jr. 2-yard run (Collin Rogers kick), 12:19. Mustangs 7–0. Drive: 7 plays, 75 yards, 2:41.
- PITT – Ben Sauls 44-yard field goal, 5:55. Mustangs 7–3. Drive: 8 plays, 33 yards, 2:25.

Second quarter

- SMU – Roderick Daniels Jr. 3-yard run (Collin Rogers kick), 14:15. Mustangs 14–3. Drive: 15 plays, 75 yards, 6:40.
- SMU – Brashard Smith 71-yard run (Collin Rogers kick), 10:43. Mustangs 21–3. Drive: 1 play, 71 yards, 0:11.
- SMU – Brashard Smith 3-yard pass from Kevin Jennings (Collin Rogers kick), 1:53. Mustangs 28–3. Drive: 7 plays, 46 yards, 2:43.
- SMU – Collin Rogers 50-yard field goal, 0:02. Mustangs 31–3. Drive: 5 plays, 26 yards, 0:45.

Third quarter

- SMU – Collin Rogers 27-yard field goal, 9:39. Mustangs 34–3. Drive: 8 plays, 18 yards, 3:49.
- PITT – Desmond Reid 1-yard run (Eli Holstein rush), 0:36. Mustangs 34–11. Drive: 12 plays, 56 yards, 3:35.

Fourth quarter

- SMU – Brashard Smith 18-yard run (Collin Rogers kick), 10:43. Mustangs 41–11. Drive: 6 plays, 75 yards, 2:50.
- SMU – Matthew Hibner 80-yard pass from Kevin Jennings (Collin Rogers kick), 9:56. Mustangs 48–11. Drive: 1 play, 80 yards, 0:11.
- PITT – Kenny Johnson 13-yard pass from Nate Yarnell (Ben Sauls kick), 4:01. Mustangs 48–18. Drive: 4 plays, 53 yards, 1:23.
- PITT – Malachi Thomas 1-yard pass from Nate Yarnell (Ben Sauls kick), 0:23. Mustangs 48–25. Drive: 7 plays, 70 yards, 1:57.

Statistics	PITT	SMU
First downs	30	19
Total yards	453	467
Rushing yards	103	161
Passing yards	350	306
Turnovers	2	0
Time of possession	31:44	28:16

Team	Category	Player	Statistics
Pittsburgh	Passing	Eli Holstein	29/47, 248 yards, INT
Pittsburgh	Rushing	Desmond Reid	13 rushes, 49 yards, TD
Pittsburgh	Receiving	Kenny Johnson	8 receptions, 81 yards, TD
SMU	Passing	Kevin Jennings	17/25, 306 yards, 2 TD
SMU	Rushing	Brashard Smith	23 rushes, 161 yards, 2 TD
SMU	Receiving	Matthew Hibner	3 receptions, 108 yards, TD

SMU handily defeated Pitt 48–25, giving the team their first loss of the season. Following their victory, SMU was ranked number 13 in the country by the Associated Press, the highest such rating the team had received since 1985. A concurrent loss by Clemson left SMU and Miami as the only remaining undefeated teams in ACC conference play, clearing SMU's potential path to the ACC Championship Game and the College Football Playoff. SMU's 5–0 start in conference play made them the best performing former Group of Five team in their first year in a Power conference.

=== Boston College ===
Boston College Eagles at No. 14 SMU Mustangs – Game summary

Quarter	1	2	3	4	Total
Eagles	0	14	7	7	28
No. 14 Mustangs	10	10	11	7	38

at Gerald J. Ford Stadium, University Park, Texas

- Date: November 16
- Game time: 2:30 p.m. CDT
- Game weather: Sunny, 76 °F (24 °C)
- Game attendance: 34,438
- Referee: Nate Black
- TV announcers (ESPN): Bob Wischusen, Louis Riddick, and Kris Budden
- Box score, Recap

Game information
First quarter
- SMU – Roderick Daniels Jr. 15-yard pass from Kevin Jennings (Collin Rogers kick), 7:35. Mustangs 7–0. Drive: 6 plays, 57 yards, 2:16.
- SMU – Collin Rogers 35-yard field goal, 0:42. Mustangs 10–0. Drive: 8 plays, 33 yards, 3:09.

Second quarter

- BC – Kye Robichaux 2-yard run (Liam Conner kick), 9:49. Mustangs 10–7. Drive: 13 plays, 75 yards, 5:53.
- SMU – Brashard Smith 4-yard run (Collin Rogers kick), 5:53. Mustangs 17–7. Drive: 9 plays, 92 yards, 3:50.
- BC – Kamari Morales 13-yard pass from Grayson James (Liam Conner kick), 1:03. Mustangs 17–14. Drive: 12 plays, 75 yards, 4:50.
- SMU – Collin Rogers 41-yard field goal, 0:00. Mustangs 20–14. Drive: 4 plays, 56 yards, 0:24.

Third quarter

- BC – Grayson James 20-yard run (Liam Conner kick), 10:45. Eagles 21–20. Drive: 8 plays, 83 yards, 4:10.
- SMU – Jordan Hudson 38-yard pass from Kevin Jennings (Brashard Smith run), 8:52. Mustangs 28–21. Drive: 6 plays, 75 yards, 1:53.
- SMU – Collin Rogers 37-yard field goal, 4:02. Mustangs 31–21. Drive: 10 plays, 42 yards, 3:49.

Fourth quarter

- BC – Kye Robichaux 3-yard run (Liam Conner kick), 5:52. Mustangs 31–28. Drive: 10 plays, 74 yards, 5:59.
- SMU – Key'Shawn Smith 5-yard pass from Kevin Jennings (Collin Rogers kick), 0:08. Mustangs 38–28. Drive: 4 plays, 13 yards, 1:03.

Statistics	BC	SMU
First downs	23	25
Total yards	417	438
Rushing yards	180	140
Passing yards	237	298
Turnovers	1	1
Time of possession	35:09	24:51

Team	Category	Player	Statistics
Boston College	Passing	Grayson James	18/32, 237 yards, TD, INT
Boston College	Rushing	Kye Robichaux	21 rushes, 90 yards, 2 TD
Boston College	Receiving	Reed Harris	4 receptions, 78 yards
SMU	Passing	Kevin Jennings	24/35, 298 yards, 3 TD, INT
SMU	Rushing	Brashard Smith	18 rushes, 120 yards, TD
SMU	Receiving	Jordan Hudson	7 receptions, 99 yards, TD

SMU defeated Boston College 38–28 in a rematch of the 2023 Fenway Bowl. Though SMU led for most of the game, their defense faltered after the first quarter, allowing Boston College to briefly take the lead at the start of the second half. Though SMU took back the lead on the next drive, Boston College played the game close enough to have a chance to make a comeback late in the fourth quarter. However, SMU's defense had regained its footing by this point, sacking quarterback Grayson James on back to back plays to force a turnover on downs, setting SMU up for a game-sealing touchdown.

=== At Virginia ===
No. 13 SMU Mustangs at Virginia Cavaliers – Game summary

Quarter	1	2	3	4	Total
No. 13 Mustangs	7	10	3	13	33
Cavaliers	0	0	0	7	7

at Scott Stadium, Charlottesville, Virginia

- Date: November 23
- Game time: 11:00 a.m. CST/12:00 p.m. EST
- Game weather: Sunny, 56 °F (13 °C)
- Game attendance: 36,305
- Referee: Jerry Magallanes
- TV announcers (ESPN2): Roy Philpott, Sam Acho, and Taylor Davis
- Box score, Recap

Game information
First quarter
- SMU – Brashard Smith 4-yard run (Collin Rogers kick), 7:58. Mustangs 7–0. Drive: 7 plays, 78 yards, 1:52.

Second quarter

- SMU – Jordan Hudson 17-yard pass from Kevin Jennings (Collin Rogers kick), 5:52. Mustangs 14–0. Drive: 9 plays, 76 yards, 3:27.
- SMU – Collin Rogers 35-yard field goal, 1:25. Mustangs 17–0. Drive: 10 plays, 58 yards, 2:39.

Third quarter

- SMU – Collin Rogers 39-yard field goal, 10:12. Mustangs 20–0. Drive: 6 plays, 6 yards, 2:35.

Fourth quarter

- SMU – Kevin Jennings 1-yard run (run failed), 12:21. Mustangs 26–0. Drive: 14 plays, 74 yards, 7:17.
- UVA – Malachi Fields 4-yard pass from Anthony Colandrea (Will Bettridge kick), 4:16. Mustangs 26–7. Drive: 9 plays, 27 yards, 4:25.
- SMU – Matthew Hibner 16-yard pass from Kevin Jennings (Collin Rogers kick), 1:42. Mustangs 33–7. Drive: 5 plays, 42 yards, 2:33.

Statistics	SMU	UVA
First downs	20	14
Total yards	434	173
Rushing yards	111	65
Passing yards	323	108
Turnovers	2	0
Time of possession	28:25	31:35

Team	Category	Player	Statistics
SMU	Passing	Kevin Jennings	25/33, 323 yards, 2 TD, INT
SMU	Rushing	Brashard Smith	19 rushes, 63 yards, TD
SMU	Receiving	Moochie Dixon	4 receptions, 89 yards
Virginia	Passing	Anthony Colandrea	18/27, 108 yards, TD
Virginia	Rushing	Noah Vaughn	10 rushes, 44 yards
Virginia	Receiving	Malachi Fields	4 receptions, 42 yards, TD

SMU defeated Virginia by a wide margin, 33–7, clinching a spot in the ACC Championship Game. SMU's defense nearly forced a shutout, sacking Virginia quarterback Anthony Colandrea nine times, but Colandrea threw one touchdown pass in the fourth quarter. This game would have been a rematch of the 2021 Fenway Bowl, but the latter game had been canceled due to issues related to the COVID-19 pandemic. Due to the large number of upset defeats of other highly-ranked teams this week, SMU moved up to number nine in the College Football Playoff poll, raising the possibility of the team making the playoffs as an at-large team even if they lose the conference championship.

=== California ===
California Golden Bears at No. 9 SMU Mustangs – Game summary

Quarter	1	2	3	4	Total
Golden Bears	0	0	3	3	6
No. 9 Mustangs	14	7	0	17	38

at Gerald J. Ford Stadium, University Park, Texas

- Date: November 30
- Game time: 2:30 p.m. CST
- Game weather: Sunny, 60 °F (16 °C)
- Game attendance: 33,178
- Referee: Tim Hedgepeth
- TV announcers (ESPN2): Brian Custer, Rod Gilmore, and Lauren Sisler
- Box score, Recap

Game information
First quarter
- SMU – Matther Hibner 11-yard pass from Kevin Jennings (Collin Rogers kick), 8:36. Mustangs 7–0. Drive: 7 plays, 54 yards, 3:19.
- SMU – Brashard Smith 5-yard run (Collin Rogers kick), 4:04. Mustangs 14–0. Drive: 7 plays, 62 yards, 3:07.

Second quarter

- SMU – Derrick McFall 8-yard run (Collin Rogers kick), 13:02. Mustangs 21–0. Drive: 9 plays, 88 yards, 3:21.

Third quarter

- CAL – Ryan Coe 40-yard field goal, 5:30. Mustangs 21–3. Drive: 12 plays, 45 yards, 5:15.

Fourth quarter

- CAL – Ryan Coe 53-yard field goal, 14:54. Mustangs 21–6. Drive: 5 plays, 55 yards, 2:22.
- SMU – Collin Rogers 48-yard field goal, 9:25. Mustangs 24–6. Drive: 9 plays, 44 yards, 5:29.
- SMU – Brashard Smith 23-yard pass from Kevin Jennings (Collin Rogers kick), 8:28. Mustangs 31–6. Drive: 2 plays, 21 yards, 0:46.
- SMU – Key'Shawn Smith 40-yard pass from Preston Stone (Collin Rogers kick), 3:38. Mustangs 38–6. Drive: 6 plays, 62 yards, 3:25.

Statistics	CAL	SMU
First downs	16	20
Total yards	254	415
Rushing yards	95	115
Passing yards	159	300
Turnovers	1	0
Time of possession	31:17	28:43

Team	Category	Player	Statistics
California	Passing	Chandler Rogers	8/15, 84 yards
California	Rushing	Jaydn Ott	13 rushes, 37 yards
California	Receiving	Nyziah Hunter	5 receptions, 85 yards
SMU	Passing	Kevin Jennings	20/30, 225 yards, 2 TD
SMU	Rushing	Brashard Smith	16 rushes, 68 yards, TD
SMU	Receiving	Brashard Smith	3 receptions, 66 yards, TD

=== Vs. No. 17 Clemson (ACC Championship Game) ===
2024 ACC Championship Game
No. 17 Clemson Tigers vs. No. 8 SMU Mustangs – Game summary

Quarter	1	2	3	4	Total
No. 17 Tigers	21	3	7	3	34
No. 8 Mustangs	7	0	7	17	31

at Bank of America Stadium, Charlotte, North Carolina

- Date: December 7
- Game time: 7:00 p.m. CST/8:00 p.m. EST
- Game weather: Clear, 44 °F (7 °C)
- Game attendance: 53,808
- Referee: Adam Savoie
- TV announcers (ABC): Sean McDonough, Greg McElroy, and Molly McGrath
- Box score, Recap

Game information
First quarter
- CLEM – Bryant Wesco 35-yard pass from Cade Klubnik (Nolan Hauser kick), 13:35. Tigers 7–0. Drive: 2 plays, 33 yards, 0:39.
- CLEM – Jake Brinningstool 5-yard pass from Cade Klubnik (Nolan Hauser kick), 10:47. Tigers 14–0. Drive: 4 plays, 28 yards, 1:54.
- SMU – Kevin Jennings 24-yard run (Collin Rogers kick), 7:05. Tigers 14–7. Drive: 10 plays, 75 yards, 3:42.
- CLEM – Bryant Wesco 43-yard pass from Cade Klubnik (Nolan Hauser kick), 3:28. Tigers 21–7. Drive: 8 plays, 75 yards, 3:37.

Second quarter

- CLEM – Nolan Hauser 44-yard field goal, 5:22. Tigers 24–7. Drive: 7 plays, 19 yards, 2:15.

Third quarter

- SMU – Brashard Smith 10-yard pass from Kevin Jennings (Collin Rogers kick), 11:04. Tigers 24–14. Drive: 7 plays, 74 yards, 2:30.
- CLEM – Jake Brinningstool 5-yard pass from Cade Klubnik (Nolan Hauser kick), 0:23. Tigers 31–14. Drive: 10 plays, 58 yards, 4:55.

Fourth quarter

- SMU – Matthew Hibner 20-yard pass from Kevin Jennings (Collin Rogers kick), 13:22. Tigers 31–21. Drive: 7 plays, 61 yards, 2:01.
- SMU – Collin Rogers 46-yard field goal, 6:56. Tigers 31–24. Drive: 8 plays, 21 yards, 3:17.
- SMU – Roderick Daniels Jr. 4-yard pass from Kevin Jennings (Collin Rogers kick), 0:16. Tied 31–31. Drive: 16 plays, 79 yards, 3:49.
- CLEM – Nolan Hauser 56-yard field goal, 0:00. Tigers 34–31. Drive: 2 plays, 17 yards, 0:16.

Statistics	CLEM	SMU
First downs	20	28
Total yards	326	458
Rushing yards	64	154
Passing yards	262	304
Turnovers	0	2
Time of possession	32:09	27:51

Team	Category	Player	Statistics
Clemson	Passing	Cade Klubnik	24/41, 262 yards, 4 TD
Clemson	Rushing	Phil Mafah	13 rushes, 28 yards
Clemson	Receiving	Bryant Wesco	8 receptions, 143 yards, 2 TD
SMU	Passing	Kevin Jennings	31/50, 304 yards, 3 TD, INT
SMU	Rushing	Brashard Smith	24 rushes, 113 yards
SMU	Receiving	Roderick Daniels Jr.	8 receptions, 97 yards, TD

SMU faced Clemson in the ACC Championship game, with Clemson advancing after Miami's loss to Syracuse the prior week. SMU quarterback Kevin Jennings fumbled the ball on the opening drive, giving Clemson favorable field position to take the lead early in the game. On the following drive, a punt return and a penalty against SMU allowed Clemson to easily score again. Clemson led 21–7 by the end of the first quarter after both teams traded touchdowns. Jennings threw an interception late in the first quarter, but SMU's defense held Clemson to only a field goal throughout the second quarter, leaving Clemson with a 24–7 lead at halftime.

At the start of the second half, SMU forced a punt, then scored on their opening drive, attempting to begin a comeback, but Clemson scored another touchdown in the third quarter to regain their 17-point lead. SMU began their comeback in the fourth quarter, scoring 17 points unanswered in four drives to tie the game with 16 seconds left, opening up the possibility to send the game to overtime. However, a favorable kickoff return and a single passing play gave Clemson the chance to win the game on a walk-off field goal. Freshman kicker Nolan Hauser converted a 56-yard field goal to give Clemson a 34–31 lead as time expired, winning the ACC Championship and earning a spot in the College Football Playoff.

SMU's loss to Clemson sparked debate over whether SMU should still qualify for an at-large bid in the College Football Playoff. This debate primarily focused on the qualifications of SMU versus Alabama, who was ranked number 11 in the CFP poll prior to the game. Questions arose over the issues of each team's strength of schedule and whether teams should be punished for playing in and losing conference championships. SMU only had one loss to a ranked team, BYU, prior to the championship game, and no wins against ranked teams, whereas Alabama had three losses, including to unranked teams Oklahoma and Vanderbilt. However, Alabama had also beaten Georgia, the winner of the SEC Championship, in the regular season, and had a much higher strength of schedule than SMU. Clemson head coach Dabo Swinney, the Clemson team, and ACC Commissioner Jim Phillips all supported SMU's potential place in the playoffs. Prior to the release of the final CFP rankings, the AP Poll had ranked Alabama (11) above SMU (12) by one vote. Ultimately, the CFP committee ranked SMU tenth, edging Alabama out of the playoffs and setting up a first-round game against Penn State at Beaver Stadium.

=== At No. 4 Penn State (CFP First Round) ===
No. 10 SMU Mustangs at No. 4 Penn State Nittany Lions (CFP First Round) – Game summary

Quarter	1	2	3	4	Total
No. 10 Mustangs	0	0	3	7	10
No. 4 Nittany Lions	7	21	3	7	38

at Beaver Stadium, State College, Pennsylvania

- Date: December 21
- Game time: 11:00 a.m. CST/12:00 p.m. EST
- Game weather: Sunny, 25 °F (−4 °C)
- Game attendance: 106,013
- Referee: David Smith
- TV announcers (TNT): Mark Jones, Roddy Jones, Quint Kessenich, and Tom Luginbill
- Box score, Recap

Game information
First quarter
- PSU – Dominic DeLuca 23-yard interception return (Ryan Barker kick), 6:08. Nittany Lions 7–0.

Second quarter

- PSU – Tony Rojas 59-yard interception return (Ryan Barker kick), 13:09. Nittany Lions 14–0.
- PSU – Kaytron Allen 25-yard run (Ryan Barker kick), 5:00. Nittany Lions 21–0. Drive: 9 plays, 75 yards, 3:06.
- PSU – Nicholas Singleton 1-yard run (Ryan Barker kick), 1:03. Nittany Lions 28–0. Drive: 7 plays, 38 yards, 2:14.

Third quarter

- SMU – Collin Rogers 28-yard field goal, 10:59. Nittany Lions 28–3. Drive: 9 plays, 42 yards, 4:01.
- PSU – Ryan Barker 40-yard field goal, 8:13. Nittany Lions 31–3. Drive: 7 plays, 25 yards, 2:46.

Fourth quarter

- PSU – Kaytron Allen 4-yard run (Ryan Barker kick), 12:56. Nittany Lions 38–3. Drive: 9 plays, 75 yards, 5:26.
- SMU – Roderick Daniels Jr. 28-yard pass from Kevin Jennings (Collin Rogers kick), 7:31. Nittany Lions 38–10. Drive: 5 plays, 42 yards, 2:28.

Statistics	SMU	PSU
First downs	21	18
Total yards	253	325
Rushing yards	58	189
Passing yards	195	136
Turnovers	3	1
Time of possession	28:48	31:12

Team	Category	Player	Statistics
SMU	Passing	Kevin Jennings	20/36, 195 yards, TD, 3 INT
SMU	Rushing	Brashard Smith	18 rushes, 62 yards
SMU	Receiving	Roderick Daniels Jr.	4 receptions, 64 yards, TD
Penn State	Passing	Drew Allar	13/22, 127 yards
Penn State	Rushing	Nicholas Singleton	14 rushes, 90 yards, TD
Penn State	Receiving	Harrison Wallace III	4 receptions, 48 yards

SMU matched up with Penn State, with each team making their respective CFP debuts in their first round game. The game was their third meeting, after a Penn State win in 1978 and a tie in the 1948 Cotton Bowl Classic. Prior to the game, both SMU backup quarterback Preston Stone and Penn State backup quarterback Beau Pribula announced they would enter the transfer portal. Stone announced he would stay on SMU's team through the playoffs, while Pribula announced he would not, citing conflict between the timing of the transfer window and the playoffs. Penn State, the higher seed of the two teams, hosted the game at Beaver Stadium, announcing a white out for the game despite the noon kickoff.
