= Kendall Donnerson =

American football player (born 1996)

No. 91
- Position: Defensive end

Personal information
- Born: April 22, 1996 (age 30); Maumelle, Arkansas, U.S.
- Listed height: 6 ft 3 in (1.91 m)
- Listed weight: 249 lb (113 kg)

Career information
- High school: Maumelle
- College: Southeast Missouri State (2014–2017)
- NFL draft: 2018: 7th round, 248th overall pick

Career history
- Green Bay Packers (2018); Oakland / Las Vegas Raiders (2019–2020)*; Cincinnati Bengals (2020)*; Carolina Panthers (2021)*; New Orleans Saints (2021)*; Carolina Panthers (2021)*
- * Offseason or practice squad member only
- Stats at Pro Football Reference

Kendall Donnerson (born April 22, 1996) is an American former professional football player who was a defensive end in the National Football League (NFL). He played college football for the Southeast Missouri State Redhawks.

== Professional career ==
=== Green Bay Packers ===
Donnerson was selected by the Green Bay Packers in the seventh round (248th overall) of the 2018 NFL draft. He signed his rookie contract on May 7, 2018. He was waived on September 1, 2018, and was signed to the practice squad the next day. He was promoted to the active roster on December 4, 2018.

On August 8, 2019, he was placed on injured reserve by the Packers. He was released on August 19.

=== Oakland Raiders ===
On October 15, 2019, Donnerson was signed to the Oakland Raiders practice squad. On December 30, 2019, Donnerson was signed to a reserve/future contract. He was waived on May 5, 2020.

=== Cincinnati Bengals ===
On September 30, 2020, Donnerson was signed to the Cincinnati Bengals practice squad. He was released on November 3.

=== Carolina Panthers (first stint) ===
On May 16, 2021, Donnerson signed with the Carolina Panthers. He was waived by Carolina on May 26.

=== New Orleans Saints ===
On July 26, 2021, Donnerson signed with the New Orleans Saints. He was released on August 4, 2021.

=== Carolina Panthers (second stint) ===
On August 8, 2021, Donnerson signed with the Panthers. He was waived on August 24.
