= Maumelle Country Club =

Private golf course in Arkansas

- Interactive map of Maumelle Country Club
- 34°50′35″N 92°25′10″W

Club information
- Established: 1969-1970
- Type: Private
- Tota holes: 18
- Greens: bent-grass
- Fairways: Bermuds grass

Maumelle Country Club is a private 18-hole golf course located at 100 Club Manor Drive, in Maumelle, Arkansas, which was opened for play in 1970. Roughly 12 miles northwest of Little Rock, Arkansas, the club was designed by architect Edmund "Ed" B. Ault. The course was opened in 1970. With a par of 72, the course has hosted numerous amateur, semi-professional, and professional events.

== Construction and design ==
The course is of traditional parkland style, featuring broad corridors, strategic bunkering, and straight-forward shot values. Ault, who was known for designing difficult championship courses, wanted to create a metropolitan course to adhere to both daily play and professional-level tournaments. The course features multiple tree-lined fairways and consists of long par-5 holes. The championship tees measure 7,492 yards with a slope of 136 for a total course rating of 75.6. It is one of the longest courses in the state.

== History ==
Since its opening in the 1970s, the course has hosted numerous events of different level. The course hosted its first major event in 1987, when it was the location of a satellite PGA event. In 1980, it served as a stop on the Tournament Players Association (TPA).

In 2020, the club made headlines when it opposed a proposal to develop housing on nearby land. However, in 2023, the club raised concerns among neighbors over the planned development of a weddings and event center at the country club.

In July 2020, Maumelle Country Club hosted the 47th Annual Maumelle Classic, which was subsequently decided in a playoff. In 2022 and 2024, they would host the 48th and 49th Annual Maumelle Classic. In July 2025, the course was the host of the 44th U.S. Mid-Amateur Qualifier, an annual USGA qualifying event. The course is slated to host the 11th U.S. Women's Four-Ball Qualifier, which is also an annual USGA qualifying event, in late 2025.
