= Matthew Hibner =

American football player (born 2002)

- Hibner in 2026

No. 88 – Baltimore Ravens
- Position: Tight end
- Roster status: Active

Personal information
- Born: March 9, 2002 (age 24); Burke, Virginia, U.S.
- Listed height: 6 ft 4 in (1.93 m)
- Listed weight: 250 lb (113 kg)

Career information
- High school: Lake Braddock (Burke)
- College: Michigan (2020–2023); SMU (2024–2025)
- NFL draft: 2026: 4th round, 133rd overall pick

Career history
- Baltimore Ravens (2026–present)

Awards and highlights
- CFP national champion (2023)

Career NFL statistics as of Week 9, 2026
- Receptions: 6
- Receiving yards: 75
- Receiving touchdowns: 1
- Stats at Pro Football Reference

Matthew Hibner (born March 9, 2002) is an American professional football tight end for the Baltimore Ravens of the National Football League (NFL). He played college football for the Michigan Wolverines and SMU Mustangs. Hibner was selected by the Ravens in the fourth round of the 2026 NFL draft.

== Early life ==
Hibner is from Burke, Virginia. He attended Lake Braddock High School in Burke where he played football as a tight end. He also played basketball for a time before deciding to focus solely on football. He had relatively little attention as a college recruit entering his senior year due to his small size. After being advised by his coach to add weight, Hibner "loaded up a plastic tub each day, full of eggs and meat wrapped in lettuce, carrying it around the hallways of Lake Braddock, [and] added nearly 40 pounds," according to The Washington Post. He posted 42 receptions for 940 yards and 12 touchdowns in his senior year while winning the 6C regional championship.

Hibner was ranked outside of the top 1,000 college recruits in May 2019, but by the end of his senior year was ranked the 14th-best tight end and a top-160 prospect nationally by 247Sports. He was also a top student, posting a grade-point average (GPA) of 4.3 while having never received a "B" grade through high school. He committed to play college football for the Michigan Wolverines.

== College career ==
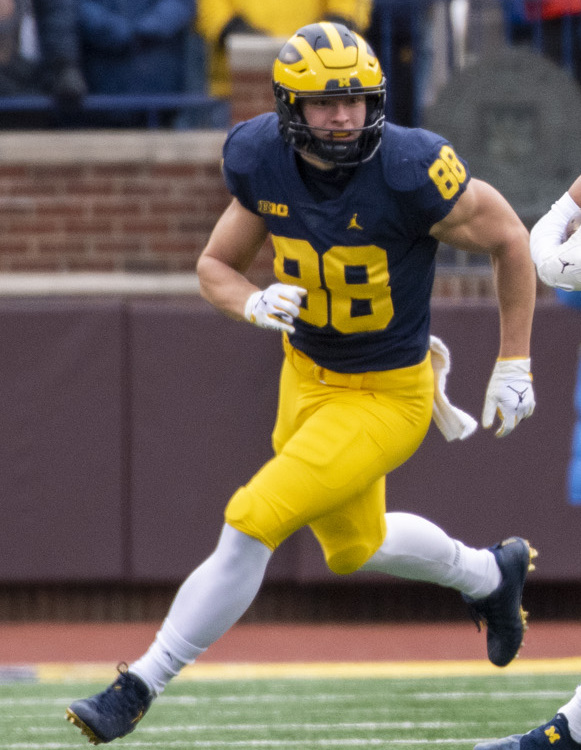
Hibner playing for the Michigan State Spartans, 2022

Hibner appeared in no games as a true freshman at Michigan in 2020, then played in eight games on special teams in 2021. In 2022, he appeared in 13 games, posting two catches for 15 yards along with three tackles and a fumble recovery. He won a national championship during the 2023 season while playing seven games and recording two tackles. Across his four years at Michigan, Hibner played in 28 games as a reserve, catching only two passes for 15 yards while tallying five tackles. Following the 2023 season, he entered the NCAA transfer portal and transferred to the SMU Mustangs. He saw more playing time at SMU, starting eight games during the 2024 season while recording 24 catches for 368 yards and four touchdowns. That year, he scored his first collegiate touchdown on an 80-yard catch against the Pittsburgh Panthers. He returned for a final season in 2025 and posted 31 catches for 436 yards and four touchdowns. At the conclusion of his collegiate career, Hibner was invited to the 2026 Senior Bowl.

=== Statistics ===
Year	Team	GP	Receiving			
Year	Team	GP	Rec	Yds	Avg	TD
2020	Michigan	0	Did not play			
2021	Michigan	8	0	0	–	0
2022	Michigan	13	2	15	7.5	0
2023	Michigan	7	0	0	–	0
2024	SMU	14	24	368	15.3	4
2025	SMU	13	31	436	14.1	4
Career		55	57	819	14.4	8

== Professional career ==
Pre-draft measurables
Height	Weight	Arm length	Hand span	Wingspan	40-yard dash	10-yard split	20-yard split	20-yard shuttle	Three-cone drill	Vertical jump	Broad jump	Bench press
6 ft 4 1/4 in (1.94 m)	251 lb (114 kg)	32 3/8 in (0.82 m)	9 3/8 in (0.24 m)	6 ft 5 5/8 in (1.97 m)	4.57 s	1.61 s	2.68 s	4.37 s	7.35 s	37.0 in (0.94 m)	9 ft 8 in (2.95 m)	28 reps
All values from NFL Combine/Pro Day

Hibner playing for the Ravens against the Jacksonville Jaguars, 2026

Hibner was selected by the Baltimore Ravens in the fourth round (133rd overall) of the 2026 NFL draft. In Week 3 against the Dallas Cowboys, Hibner recorded his first career touchdown on a two–yard reception from Lamar Jackson.

== Personal life ==
Hibner's brother Zachary plays linebacker for the SMU Mustangs.
