= Maumelle High School =

Location
- 100 Victory Lane; Maumelle, Arkansas 72113; United States; 34°51′44″N 92°23′7″W

Information
- Type: Public secondary
- Established: 2011 (15 years ago)
- School district: Pulaski County Special School District
- NCES District ID: 0511850
- CEEB code: 041861
- Principal: Matthew "Nick" Farr
- Staff: 69.28 (FTE)
- Grades: 9-12
- Enrollment: 844 (2023-2024)
- Student to teacher ratio: 12.18
- Campus type: Suburban
- Colors: Scarlet and black
- Athletics conference: 5A West (2014-2018) (5A Central 2018-Present)
- Sports: Baseball, Basketball (B/G), Competitive Cheer, Dance, Football, Swimming (B/G), Golf (B/G), Soccer (B/G), Softball, Tennis (B/G), Volleyball, Wrestling (B/G), Track & Field (B/G), Cross-Country (B/G)
- Team name: Hornets
- Yearbook: The Swarm
- Feeder schools: Maumelle Middle School
- Affiliations: Arkansas Activities Association
- Website: mhs.pcssd.org

Maumelle High School is a public secondary school located in Maumelle, Arkansas, United States, for students in grades nine through twelve. Maumelle is one of four high schools administered by the Pulaski County Special School District and is fed into by Maumelle Middle School.

In addition to Maumelle it serves Crystal Hill.

== History ==
Opened in fall 2011, Maumelle is the newest primary public high school in the Pulaski County Special School District and its 320,000 square foot facilities replace the former Oak Grove High School that closed following the 2010–2011 school year. The school is accredited by AdvancED.

== Academics ==
Maumelle maintains a cadre of career teaching professionals with several educators qualified as National Board Certified Teachers. College preparatory offerings include standard and Advanced Placement classes with opportunities for college credit and concurrent credit for college courses.

=== Fine Arts ===
Students may participate in various musical and performing arts including: band (e.g., concert band, jazz band), choir (e.g., a cappella, barbershop quartet, beauty shop quartet) and theater (e.g., competitive speech, drama, stagecraft).

== Extracurricular activities ==
The Maumelle High School mascot is the Hornet with the school colors of scarlet and black.

=== Athletics ===
For the 2022–2024 seasons, the Hornets will participate in the 5A Central Conference. Competition is primarily sanctioned by the Arkansas Activities Association with student-athletes sporting the scarlet and black and competing in baseball, basketball (boys/girls), competitive cheer, competitive dance, football, golf (boys/girls), soccer (boys/girls), softball, tennis (boys/girls), track and field (boys/girls), volleyball and wrestling.

- Wrestling: The wrestling team won the school's first athletic title by capturing the combined 1A-5A state wrestling championship in spring 2013 and repeated in 2014 by a huge margin with 352.5 points breaking the record of most team points, 9 individual state champions, 11 all state wrestlers and the only Arkansas wrestling team to repeat as state champions.
- Cross country: The boys' cross country team won the 4A state cross country championship in fall 2013 and repeated in the fall of 2014 as 5A champions. The boys' cross country team won the 5A state championship 2016.
- Girls soccer: The girls' soccer team were 4A State Runner Up in the Spring of 2014.
- Boys basketball: The boys' basketball team were 5A State Runner Up in 2015, 2016, 2021 and 2024.
- Boys Tennis: The boys tennis team was the 2023 5A State runners up. With Ethan Tan leading the way being the 5A singles runner up.

== Notable alumni ==
- Darren McFadden (2005–Oak Grove)—American football player; two-time All-American running back; Doak Walker Award (2006, 2007)
- Kendall Donnerson (2015)-NFL player
- Andrew Chamblee (2022)–College football offensive tackle for the Arkansas Razorbacks
