= P. J. Williams (offensive lineman) =

American football player (born 2004)

No. 59 – SMU Mustangs
- Position: Offensive tackle
- Class: Redshirt Senior

Personal information
- Born: May 4, 2004 (age 22)
- Listed height: 6 ft 5 in (1.96 m)
- Listed weight: 306 lb (139 kg)

Career information
- High school: Dickinson (Dickinson, Texas)
- College: Texas A&M (2022); SMU (2023–present)

Awards and highlights
- Second-team All-ACC (2025); Third-team All-ACC (2024)
- Stats at ESPN

Patrick "P. J." Williams Jr. (born May 4, 2004) is an American college football offensive tackle for the SMU Mustangs. He previously played for the Texas A&M Aggies.

== Early life ==
Williams attended Dickinson High School in Dickinson, Texas, where he excelled in football. After learning to play on the offensive line as a sophomore, he was a three-time first-team all-district selection at the offensive tackle position. As a senior, Williams helped Dickinson go undefeated in district play and reach the second round of the state playoffs. He was named a Class 6A second-team all-state selection by the Texas Sports Writers Association (TSWA) and earned an invite to the 2022 Under Armour All-America Game. Aside from football, Williams also played basketball at Dickinson. He averaged 12.8 points and 6.9 rebounds per game as a senior.

Williams was rated as a consensus four-star recruit. He was ranked by 247Sports as the No. 9 prospect in the state of Texas in the class of 2022. On January 21, 2021, Williams verbally committed to playing college football at Texas A&M University over offers such as Houston, LSU, Michigan, Penn State, SMU, Texas, and Texas Tech. He signed with the Aggies in December.

== College career ==
Williams appeared in one game for the Aggies in 2022 and was redshirted. He was suspended from the team indefinitely in October for violating team rules, along with multiple teammates, reportedly due to a postgame locker room incident following a loss to South Carolina. On December 2, 2022, Williams announced he would be entering the NCAA transfer portal. He was rated as a three-star transfer recruit by Rivals.com and 247Sports. Williams went on official visits to Colorado, Houston, and SMU. On January 10, 2023, it was announced that he would transfer to SMU to play for the Mustangs.

In 2023, Williams appeared in 12 games, being employed both as a tackle and a guard. He made four starts at left tackle in relief of Marcus Bryant, including in the American Athletic Conference championship game. In 2024, Williams started all 14 games for the Mustangs, mostly at right tackle. He garnered third-team all-Atlantic Coast Conference (ACC) honors. Williams was named one of six team captains for the 2025 season. He started 12 games for the Mustangs, (Note: Some sources, including his SMU bio, claim he made 13 starts. However, he did not play against Stanford.) earning second-team all-ACC accolades. Williams was named a captain again ahead of the 2026 season. He was also moved back to left tackle.

== Personal life ==
Williams was born to Katrina and Patrick Williams. During his time at SMU, he donated part of his name, image, and likeness earnings to youth sports organizations around Dallas and his hometown.

In November 2022, Williams was arrested in College Station, Texas, on a felony charge of marijuana possession. He was bonded out the next morning. Prosecution was eventually declined after Williams agreed to complete community service as a part of a pre-prosecution diversion agreement.
