= Andrew Chamblee =

American football player (born 2004)

No. 74 – SMU Mustangs
- Position: Offensive tackle
- Class: Redshirt Senior

Personal information
- Born: July 17, 2004 (age 22)
- Listed height: 6 ft 6 in (1.98 m)
- Listed weight: 308 lb (140 kg)

Career information
- High school: Maumelle (Maumelle, Arkansas)
- College: Arkansas (2022–2023); SMU (2024–present)

Awards and highlights
- SEC All-Freshman Team (2023)
- Stats at ESPN

Andrew Chamblee (born July 17, 2004) is an American college football offensive tackle for the SMU Mustangs. He previously played for the Arkansas Razorbacks.

== Early life ==
Chamblee attended Maumelle High School in Maumelle, Arkansas, where he recorded 22.5 pancake blocks as a senior. He was selected to play in the All-American Bowl in San Antonio, Texas. Chamblee was rated as a four-star recruit, the 33rd tackle, and the 4th best player in the state of Arkansas in the class of 2022. Chamblee committed to play college football for the Arkansas Razorbacks. He also held offers from schools such as Arkansas, Virginia Tech, Tennessee, Mississippi State, TCU, Missouri, Kansas.

== College career ==
=== Arkansas ===
Chamblee took a redshirt in 2022. In 2023, he played in all 12 games while making eight starts for the Razorbacks, earning Southeastern Conference (SEC) all-freshman team honors. After the conclusion of the 2023 season, Chamblee entered his name into the NCAA transfer portal.

=== SMU ===
Chamblee transferred to play for the SMU Mustangs.

== Personal life ==
His father, Jonathan, served 26 years in the U.S. Army.
