= Crystal Hill, Arkansas =

- Unincorporated community
- Crystal Hill's position in Arkansas Crystal Hill, Arkansas (the United States)
- Coordinates: 34°48′53″N 92°19′16″W
- Country: United States
- State: Arkansas
- County: Pulaski
- Township: Hill
- Elevation: 269 ft (82 m)
- Time zone: UTC-6 (Central (CST))
  - Summer (DST): UTC-5 (CDT)
- ZIP code: 72118
- Area code: 501
- GNIS feature ID: 68186

Crystal Hill is an unincorporated community in Hill Township, Pulaski County, Arkansas, United States. It is located along Crystal Hill Road near the junction of Interstate 40 (I-40) and I-430.

== History ==
When the Arkansas territorial legislature decided to move the capital from Arkansas Post in 1820, governor James Miller purchased land on Crystal Hill in an effort to profit by later selling it to the government as the new state capital. However, the final vote was between Little Rock and Cadron, a vote that selected Little Rock as territorial capital. Miller built a house and lived at Crystal Hill in protest until being appointed Collector of Customs in Salem, Massachusetts by James Monroe. Crystal Hill was never platted or incorporated.

== Education ==
Crystal Hill is in the Pulaski County Special School District. It is zoned to Crystal Hill Elementary School, Maumelle Middle School, and Maumelle High School.
