= Ahmaad Moses =

American football player (born 2004)

No. 3 – SMU Mustangs
- Position: Safety
- Class: Senior

Personal information
- Born: June 9, 2004 (age 22)
- Listed height: 5 ft 10 in (1.78 m)
- Listed weight: 205 lb (93 kg)

Career information
- High school: Mansfield Summit (Arlington, Texas)
- College: SMU (2022–2025)

Awards and highlights
- First-team All-ACC (2025)
- Stats at Pro Football Reference

Ahmaad Moses (born June 9, 2004) is an American football safety for the SMU Mustangs.

== Early life ==
Moses attended Mansfield Summit High School located in Arlington, Texas. Coming out of high school, he was rated as a three-star recruit by 247Sports, where he initially committed to play college football for the Tulane Green Wave. However, Moses would ultimately flip his commitment and sign to play for the SMU Mustangs.

== College career ==
In his first two seasons from 2022 through 2023, Moses played in 27 games, totaling 73 tackles with five going for a loss, two sacks, and two pass deflections. During the 2024 season, Moses notched 73 tackles, six pass deflections, three interceptions, and a forced fumble. In week 11 of the 2025 season, he recorded 15 tackles with two going for a loss, and two interceptions in an upset win over Miami. Moses finished the 2025 season, recording 104 tackles with five and a half being for a loss, a sack, three pass deflections, five interceptions, two fumble recoveries, and a touchdown. After the conclusion of the 2025 season, he declared for the 2026 NFL draft, while also accepting an invite to the NFL Scouting Combine.

== Professional career ==
Pre-draft measurables
Height	Weight	Arm length	Hand span	Wingspan	Vertical jump
5 ft 9 3/8 in (1.76 m)	196 lb (89 kg)	30 1/4 in (0.77 m)	9 1/8 in (0.23 m)	6 ft 1 3/4 in (1.87 m)	38.0 in (0.97 m)
All values from NFL Combine
