= Derrick McFall =

American football player (born 2005)

No. 0 – SMU Mustangs
- Position: Running back
- Class: Redshirt Sophomore

Personal information
- Born: September 16, 2005 (age 21)
- Listed height: 5 ft 11 in (1.80 m)
- Listed weight: 187 lb (85 kg)

Career information
- High school: Tyler (Tyler, Texas)
- College: SMU (2024–present)
- Stats at ESPN

Derrick McFall (born September 16, 2005) is an American college football running back for the SMU Mustangs.

== Early life ==
McFall attended high school at Tyler located in Tyler, Texas. Coming out of high school, he was rated as a four-star recruit, where he held offers from schools such as Texas, Miami, Alabama, Texas A&M, TCU, Penn State, SMU, Arkansas, Louisville, Baylor, Houston, Oklahoma State, and Auburn. Initially, McFall committed to play college football for the UCLA Bruins. However, he later flipped his commitment and signed to play for the SMU Mustangs, becoming the team's top recruit in the class of 2024.

== College career ==
In week one of the 2024 season, McFall rushed for 69 yards and a touchdown on 16 carries, in a 59-7 victory over Houston Christian. During his first collegiate season in 2024, he rushed for 106 yards and two touchdowns on 26 carries. Heading into the 2025 season, McFall competed for the Mustangs starting running back job, where he was named to the Doak Walker Award watch list.
