= Garin Justice =

American football player and coach (born 1982)

Current position
- Title: Offensive line, co-offensive coordinator, and assistant head coach
- Team: SMU
- Conference: ACC

Biographical details
- Born: March 10, 1982 (age 44); Gilbert, West Virginia, U.S.
- Education: Florida State University (M.B.A.); West Virginia University (B.A.)

Playing career
- 2002–2006: West Virginia
- Position: Tackle

Coaching career (HC unless noted)
- 2006–2007: West Virginia (GA)
- 2007–2008: Florida State (GA)
- 2009–2010: Concord (OL/S&C)
- 2011–2015: Concord
- 2016–2017: Florida Atlantic (OL)
- 2018: UNLV (RGC/OL)
- 2019: UNLV (OC/OL)
- 2020–2021: Miami (FL) (OL)
- 2022–present: SMU (AHC/OL)

Head coaching record
- Overall: 40–17
- Tournaments: 2–1 (NCAA D-II playoffs)

Accomplishments and honors

Championships
- 1 WVIAC (2011); 1 MEC (2014)

Garin Brandon Justice (born March 10, 1982) is an American college football coach and former player for the West Virginia Mountaineers. He was the offensive line coach for the Miami Hurricanes. He was the offensive coordinator and offensive line coach for the UNLV Rebels and former head coach of the Concord Mountain Lions. He is currently serving as the offensive line, co-offensive coordinator, and assistant head coach with the SMU Mustangs.

== Head coaching record ==
Year	Team	Overall	Conference	Standing	Bowl/playoffs	AFCA^{#}
Concord Mountain Lions (West Virginia Intercollegiate Athletic Conference) (2011–2012)
2011	Concord	7–4	7–1	1st		
2012	Concord	7–4	6–2	T–2nd		
Concord Mountain Lions (Mountain East Conference) (2013–2015)
2013	Concord	8–3	7–2	T–2nd		
2014	Concord	13–1	10–0	1st	L NCAA Division II Semifinal	5
2015	Concord	5–5	5–5	T–5th		
Concord:		40–17	35–10			
Total:		40–17				
National championship Conference title Conference division title or championship game berth
