= Maumelle, Arkansas =

- City
- Flag Seal Logo

- Location of Maumelle in Pulaski County, Arkansas.

- Location in the United States
- Coordinates: 34°51′08″N 92°22′26″W
- Country: United States
- State: Arkansas
- County: Pulaski
- Founded: 1974
- Incorporated: 1985

Area
  - Total: 13.32 sq mi (34.49 km^{2})
  - Land: 12.08 sq mi (31.28 km^{2})
  - Water: 1.24 sq mi (3.22 km^{2})
- Elevation: 266 ft (81 m)

Population (2020)
  - Total: 19,251
  - Estimate (2025): 19,780 ▲
  - Density: 1,594/sq mi (615.5/km^{2})
- Time zone: UTC-6 (CST)
  - Summer (DST): UTC-5 (CDT)
- ZIP codes: 72113, 72118
- Area code: 501
- FIPS code: 05-44600
- GNIS feature ID: 2405039
- Website: www.maumelle.gov

Maumelle is a city in Pulaski County, Arkansas, United States. As of the 2020 census, the city's population was 19,251. The city is located northwest of Little Rock, bordering the opposite shore of the Arkansas River and is part of the Little Rock metropolitan area.

== History ==
Maumelle was the location of the second oldest Target Corporation distribution center; the center closed in 2009.

== Geography ==
According to the United States Census Bureau, the city has a total area of 12.05 square miles (31.2 km^{2}), of which 8.8 square miles (23 km^{2}) is land and 0.5 square miles (1.3 km^{2}) (5.07%) is water.

== Demographics ==
Historical population
Census	Pop.	Note	%±
1990	6,714		—
2000	10,557		57.2%
2010	17,163		62.6%
2020	19,251		12.2%
2025 (est.)	19,780	▲	2.7%
U.S. Decennial Census

Maumelle belongs to the Little Rock–North Little Rock–Conway Metropolitan Statistical Area.

=== 2020 census ===
As of the 2020 census, Maumelle had a population of 19,251. The median age was 41.0 years. 22.8% of residents were under the age of 18 and 17.8% of residents were 65 years of age or older. For every 100 females there were 90.3 males, and for every 100 females age 18 and over there were 85.7 males age 18 and over.

100.0% of residents lived in urban areas, while 0.0% lived in rural areas.

There were 7,975 households and 5,184 families in Maumelle, of which 32.4% had children under the age of 18 living in them. Of all households, 54.4% were married-couple households, 13.9% were households with a male householder and no spouse or partner present, and 27.0% were households with a female householder and no spouse or partner present. About 26.0% of all households were made up of individuals and 10.3% had someone living alone who was 65 years of age or older.

There were 8,306 housing units, of which 4.0% were vacant. The homeowner vacancy rate was 1.0% and the rental vacancy rate was 7.5%.

Maumelle racial composition
Race	Number	Percentage
White	13,562	70.4%
Black or African American	3,542	18.4%
Native American	90	0.5%
Asian	536	2.8%
Pacific Islander	5	0.0%
Some other race	242	1.3%
Two or more races	1,274	6.6%
Hispanic or Latino	758	3.9%

=== 2010 census ===
As of the census of 2010, there were 17,163 people, 6,531 households, and 3,174 families residing in the city. The population density was 463.2/km^{2} (1,199.3/mi^{2}). There were 4,294 housing units at an average density of 188.4/km^{2} (487.8/mi^{2}). The racial makeup of the city was 82.9% White, 12.1% Black or African American, 0.40% Native American, 2.3% Asian, 0.01% Pacific Islander, 0.41% from other races, and 0.97% from two or more races. 1.77% of the population were Hispanic or Latino of any race.

There were 6,531 households, out of which 39.4% had children under the age of 18 living with them, 66.8% were married couples living together, 8.0% had a female householder with no husband present, and 23.1% were non-families. 19.8% of all households were made up of individuals, and 6.0% had someone living alone who was 65 years of age or older. The average household size was 2.59 and the average family size was 2.94.

The population consisted of 25.8% under the age of 18, 5.6% from 18 to 24, 35.2% from 25 to 44, 25.5% from 45 to 64, and 10.2% who were 65 years of age or older. The median age was 36 years. For every 100 females, there were 93.2 males. For every 100 females age 18 and over, there were 88.9 males.

The median income for a household in the city was $71,826, and the median income for a family was $82,122. Males had a median income of $50,220 versus $35,461 for females. The per capita income for the city was $37,453. 5.3% of the population and 1.3% of families were below the poverty line. Out of the total population, 2.7% of those under the age of 18 and 15.2% of those 65 and older were living below the poverty line.

== Recreation ==
Maumelle has two recreational lakes, Lake Willastein and Lake Valencia, both surrounded by parkland, bicycle trails, and wooden bridges. Picnicking and fishing are available at both lakes. The Maumelle Veterans Memorial was formally dedicated on April 8, 2006, and is located on the shores of Lake Willastein.

The city has one of the most extensive municipal bicycle trail systems in Arkansas (13 miles) that offers access to wooded greenbelts.

== Education ==
Public education is provided by the Pulaski County Special School District and the city is home to Pine Forest Elementary School (prekindergarten through grade 5), Maumelle Middle School (grades 6 through 8), and Maumelle High School (grades 9 through 12).

Other parts of the city are zoned to Crystal Hill Elementary.

Maumelle is also served by Maumelle Charter School (K-12) inside the city limits. Central Arkansas Christian Schools, a private middle school and high school, is located two miles east of the city limits.

=== Public libraries ===
The Maumelle Public Library, located at 10 Lakepoint Drive, is part of the Central Arkansas Library System.

== Infrastructure ==
Water in Maumelle is provided by Central Arkansas Water since March 1, 2016 when it acquired the former utility. All other utilities in the county use surface water from two reservoirs tapped by Central Arkansas Water.

The 4,226-foot-long (1,288 m) Big Dam Bridge, the second-longest pedestrian bridge in the United States, is located three miles east of Maumelle along Highway 100 (Maumelle Boulevard). The 14-foot-wide (4.3 m) bridge was designed by the United States Army Corps of Engineers and rises 65 feet (20 m) above the Arkansas River and Murray Lock and Dam. It is the longest pedestrian bridge in North America originally designed and built for that purpose. Pulaski County Judge "Buddy" Villines formally opened the bridge to the public on September 30, 2006.

== Notable people ==
- Brandon Achor, Republican member of the Arkansas House of Representatives.
- Drew Smyly, Major League Baseball pitcher for the Chicago Cubs
