= 2025 Stanford Cardinal football team =

American college football season

2025 Stanford Cardinal football
- Conference: Atlantic Coast Conference
- Record: 4–8 (3–5 ACC)
- Head coach: Frank Reich (interim) (1st season)
- Offensive coordinator: Nate Byham (1st season)
- Offensive scheme: Pro-style
- Defensive coordinator: Bobby April (3rd season)
- Co-defensive coordinator: Andy Thompson (1st season)
- Base defense: 2–4–5
- Home stadium: Stanford Stadium

Uniform

2025 Atlantic Coast Conference football standings
	Conf.			Overall
Team	W		L	W		L
No. 16 Virginia y	7	–	1	11	–	3
Duke y$	6	–	2	9	–	5
No. 2 Miami (FL) ^	6	–	2	13	–	3
Georgia Tech	6	–	2	9	–	4
SMU	6	–	2	9	–	4
Pittsburgh	6	–	2	8	–	5
Louisville	4	–	4	9	–	4
Wake Forest	4	–	4	9	–	4
NC State	4	–	4	8	–	5
California	4	–	4	7	–	6
Clemson	4	–	4	7	–	6
Stanford	3	–	5	4	–	8
Florida State	2	–	6	5	–	7
Virginia Tech	2	–	6	3	–	9
North Carolina	2	–	6	4	–	8
Boston College	1	–	7	2	–	10
Syracuse	1	–	7	3	–	9
Championship: Duke 27, Virginia 20^{OT}
^ – College Football Playoff participant; $ – Conference champion; y – Championship game participant; As of November 11, 2026; Rankings from AP Poll

The 2025 Stanford Cardinal football team represented Stanford University in the Atlantic Coast Conference (ACC) during the 2025 NCAA Division I FBS football season. The Cardinal were led by interim head coach Frank Reich, following the firing of Troy Taylor in March 2025. They played home games at Stanford Stadium located in Stanford, California.

The Stanford Cardinal drew an average home attendance of 28,171.

== Offseason ==
=== Team departures ===
2025 Stanford Offseason Departures
Name	Number	Pos.	Height, Weight	Year	Hometown	Notes
Connor McLaughlin	#71	OT	6'7, 295	5th Year-Senior	Tampa, FL	Transferred to South Florida
Ashton Daniels	#14	QB	6'2", 215	Junior	Buford, GA	Transferred to Auburn
Luke Baklenko	#78	IOL	6'6, 295	Sophomore	Thousand Oaks, CA	Transferred to Oklahoma
Jshawn Frausto-Ramos	#17	CB	6'0, 184	Sophomore	Los Angeles, CA	Transferred to Arizona
Chase Farrell	#19	WR	5'10, 165	Freshman	Westlake Village, CA	Transferred to Northwestern
Jackson Harris	#83	WR	6'3", 190	Sophomore	Berkeley, CA	Transferred to Hawaii
Connor Weselman	#15	P	6'3, 216	Senior	Atlanta, GA	Transferred to Missouri
Austin Uke	#72	OL	6'3", 290	Senior	Cedar Hill, TX	Transferred to Miami (OH)
Ismael Cisse	#84	WR	6'0", 200	RS-Freshman	Denver, CO	Transferred to Arkansas
Justin Lamson	#8	QB	6'2, 215	Junior	El Dorado Hills, CA	Transferred to Bowling Green
Trevor Mayberry	#61	IOL	6'3, 315	Senior	Tampa, FL	Transferred to Mississippi State
Omari Porter	#27	S	6'2, 205	Graduate Student	Auburn, AL	Transferred to Rice
Aaron Armitage	#9	EDGE	6'5, 260	Junior	Ajax, ON	Transferred to FIU
David Bailey	#23	OLB	6'3, 250	Junior	Irvine, CA	Transferred to Texas Tech
Emmett Mosley V	#10	WR	6'2, 205	Freshman	Chicago, IL	Transferred to Texas
Jake Maikkula	#69	OL	6'5, 295	Junior	Sedalia, CO	Transferred to Oklahoma
Mudia Reuben	#0	WR	6'2, 210	Junior	Kansas City, MO	Transferred to South Florida
Bear Bachmeier	#	QB	6'1, 220	Freshman	Murrieta, CA	Transferred to BYU
Tiger Bachmeier	#24	WR	6'1, 190	Sophomore	Murrieta, CA	Transferred to BYU
David Kasemervisz	#80	WR	6'0, 195	Senior	Sugar Land, TX	Transferred to Rice
Lukas Ungar	#89	TE	6'4, 244	5th Year-Senior	Morristown, NJ	Transferred to New Mexico State
Evan Jackson	#48	CB	5'9, 178	Senior	McDonough, GA	Entered the Transfer Portal
Jayson Raines	#82	WR	6'3, 213	Senior	West Orange, NJ	Transferred to Northern Arizona
Ryan Butler	#15	RB	5'11, 225	Junior	Plainfield, NJ	Entered the Transfer Portal
Jaden Slocum	#20	CB	6'1, 200	Senior	Alpharetta, GA	Entered the Transfer Portal
Kale Lucas	#38	S	6'0, 194	Senior	Farmington, NM	Entered the Transfer Portal
Ahmari Borden	#81	WR	6'3, 185	Sophomore	Bainbridge, GA	Entered the Transfer Portal
Brandon Jones	#25	CB	5'9, 190	Junior	Harbor City, CA	Entered the Transfer Portal
Brendon Barrow	#38	RB	5'8, 175	Senior	Etobicoke, Ontario, Canada	Entered the Transfer Portal

=== Incoming transfers ===
2025 Stanford incoming transfers
Name	Number	Pos.	Height, Weight	Year	Hometown	Notes
Jordan Washington	#	CB	6'0", 190	Senior	Westlake Village, CA	Transferred from Dartmouth
Niki Prongos	#66	OT	6'7", 285	RS-Sophomore	Novato, CA	Transferred from UCLA
Jordan Onovughe	#4	WR	6'2", 190	Sophomore	Santa Ana, CA	Transferred from Colorado
C.J. Williams	#8	WR	6'1.5", 188	Junior	Santa Ana, CA	Transferred from Wisconsin
Kai Greer	#79	IOL	6'6", 285	Freshman	Waxhaw, NC	Transferred from Georgia Tech
Caden High	#14	WR	5'10", 160	Sophomore	Loganville, GA	Transferred from South Carolina State
David Pantelis	#	WR	5'11", 185	Senior	Pittsburgh, PA	Transferred from Yale
Brendan Doyle	#80	TE	6'4", 255	RS-Junior	Gilroy, CA	Transferred from Memphis
Tuna Altahir	#6	RB	6'0", 210	Senior	Kennewick, WA	Transferred from Eastern Washington
Zach Johnson	#38	LB	6'3", 225	RS-Freshman	Coeur d'Alene, ID	Transferred from Idaho
Nathan Mejia	#	IOL	6'3", 304	RS-Junior	Arcadia, CA	Transferred from Sacramento State
Breylan Thompson	#	CB	6'1", 185	Freshman	Bellaire, TX	Transferred from Yale
Sam Neely	#	CB	5'11", 185	Freshman	Matthews, NC	Transferred from Wake Forest
Dylan Rizk	#	QB	6'2", 205	RS-Freshman	Fort Lauderdale, FL	Transferred from UCF
Nick Fattig	#	IOL	6'4", 290	RS-Freshman	League City, TX	Transferred from Texas Tech
Hunter Barth	#	LB	6'2", 230	RS-Senior	Chandler, AZ	Transferred from Cal
Ben Gulbranson	#	QB	6'3", 215	RS-Senior	Newbury Park, CA	Transferred from Oregon State

=== Recruiting class ===
College recruiting
Name	Hometown	School	Height	Weight	Commit date
JonAnthony Hall; WR	Fishers, IN	Fishers High School	6 ft 1 in (1.85 m)	175 lb (79 kg)	Jun 28, 2024
JonAnthony Hall; WR	Recruit ratings: Rivals: 247Sports: On3: ESPN: (81)				
Bear Bachmeier; QB	Murrieta, CA	Murrieta Valley High School	6 ft 2 in (1.88 m)	225 lb (102 kg)	Feb 5, 2024
Bear Bachmeier; QB	Recruit ratings: Rivals: 247Sports: On3: ESPN: (79)				
Nusi Taumoepeau; EDGE	San Francisco, CA	Westlake High School	6 ft 2 in (1.88 m)	205 lb (93 kg)	Aug 1, 2024
Nusi Taumoepeau; EDGE	Recruit ratings: Rivals: 247Sports: On3: ESPN: (78)				
Josh Williams; QB	Radnor, PA	Haverford School	6 ft 4 in (1.93 m)	300 lb (140 kg)	Feb 19, 2024
Josh Williams; QB	Recruit ratings: Rivals: 247Sports: On3: ESPN: (78)				
Adam Shovlin; DL	Wilkes-Barre, PA	Lawrenceville School	6 ft 4 in (1.93 m)	250 lb (110 kg)	Jun 6, 2024
Adam Shovlin; DL	Recruit ratings: Rivals: 247Sports: On3: ESPN: (80)				
Gabe Kaminski; EDGE	Riverside, IL	Nazareth Academy	6 ft 3 in (1.91 m)	230 lb (100 kg)	Apr 27, 2024
Gabe Kaminski; EDGE	Recruit ratings: Rivals: 247Sports: On3: ESPN: (78)				
Landon McComber; LB	Las Vegas, NV	Bishop Gorman High School	6 ft 2 in (1.88 m)	210 lb (95 kg)	Jun 7, 2024
Landon McComber; LB	Recruit ratings: Rivals: 247Sports: On3: ESPN: (78)				
Kole Briehler; DL	Pennington, NJ	Hun School of Princeton	6 ft 2 in (1.88 m)	275 lb (125 kg)	Jun 5, 2024
Kole Briehler; DL	Recruit ratings: Rivals: 247Sports: On3: ESPN: (79)				
Reiman Zebert; TE	Springfield, NE	Platteview Senior High School	6 ft 6 in (1.98 m)	220 lb (100 kg)	Jun 11, 2024
Reiman Zebert; TE	Recruit ratings: Rivals: 247Sports: On3: ESPN: (77)				
Mickey Vaccarello; LB	Pittsburgh, PA	Peters Township High School	6 ft 2 in (1.88 m)	210 lb (95 kg)	Apr 17, 2024
Mickey Vaccarello; LB	Recruit ratings: Rivals: 247Sports: On3: ESPN: (77)				
Emeka Ugorji; OT	Oak Cliff, TX	South Oak Cliff High School	6 ft 5 in (1.96 m)	290 lb (130 kg)	Jun 4, 2024
Emeka Ugorji; OT	Recruit ratings: Rivals: 247Sports: On3: ESPN: (76)				
Zach Giuliano; TE	Corona del Mar, CA	Corona del Mar High School	6 ft 6 in (1.98 m)	230 lb (100 kg)	Apr 27, 2024
Zach Giuliano; TE	Recruit ratings: Rivals: 247Sports: On3: ESPN: (77)				
Lonnie McAllister III; CB	Upper Marlboro, MD	Gonzaga College High School	5 ft 10 in (1.78 m)	180 lb (82 kg)	Apr 15, 2024
Lonnie McAllister III; CB	Recruit ratings: Rivals: 247Sports: On3: ESPN: (75)				
Omari Gaines; S	Newark, NJ	Malcolm X Shabazz High School	6 ft 2 in (1.88 m)	180 lb (82 kg)	May 7, 2024
Omari Gaines; S	Recruit ratings: Rivals: 247Sports: On3: ESPN: (76)				
Chris Garland; CB	Buford, GA	Buford High School	6 ft 0 in (1.83 m)	180 lb (82 kg)	Apr 25, 2024
Chris Garland; CB	Recruit ratings: Rivals: 247Sports: On3: ESPN: (75)				
Liam Thorpe; WR	New York City, NY	Hun School of Princeton	6 ft 0 in (1.83 m)	195 lb (88 kg)	May 15, 2024
Liam Thorpe; WR	Recruit ratings: Rivals: 247Sports: On3: ESPN: (77)				
Donte Utu; S	Manoa, HI	Punahou School	6 ft 1 in (1.85 m)	185 lb (84 kg)	May 6, 2024
Donte Utu; S	Recruit ratings: Rivals: 247Sports: On3: ESPN: (74)				
London Bironas; K	Nashville, TN	Brentwood Academy	5 ft 10 in (1.78 m)	180 lb (82 kg)	Aug 23, 2024
London Bironas; K	Recruit ratings: Rivals: 247Sports: On3: ESPN: (74)				
Overall recruit ranking: Rivals: 52 247Sports: 50 On3: 45
‡ Refers to 40-yard dash; Note: In many cases, Scout, Rivals, 247Sports, On3, and ESPN may conflict in their listings of height, weight and 40 time.; In these cases, the average was taken. ESPN grades are on a 100-point scale.; Sources: "2025 Team Ranking". Rivals.com.

== Schedule ==
Date	Time	Opponent	Site	TV	Result	Attendance
August 23	4:30 p.m.	at Hawaii*	Clarence T. C. Ching Athletics Complex; Honolulu, HI	CBS	L 20–23	15,194
September 6	7:15 p.m.	at BYU*	LaVell Edwards Stadium; Provo, UT	ESPN	L 3–27	64,692
September 13	7:30 p.m.	Boston College	Stanford Stadium; Stanford, CA	ACCN	W 30–20	22,162
September 20	4:30 p.m.	at Virginia	Scott Stadium; Charlottesville, VA	ACCN	L 20–48	36,223
September 27	4:30 p.m.	San Jose State*	Stanford Stadium; Stanford, CA (Bill Walsh Legacy Game)	ACCN	W 30–29	26,357
October 11	9:00 a.m.	at SMU	Gerald J. Ford Stadium; Dallas, TX	The CW	L 10–34	30,654
October 18	7:30 p.m.	Florida State^{†}	Stanford Stadium; Stanford, CA	ESPN	W 20–13	26,470
October 25	4:00 p.m.	at No. 9 Miami (FL)	Hard Rock Stadium; Miami Gardens, FL	ESPN	L 7–42	63,892
November 1	12:30 p.m.	Pittsburgh	Stanford Stadium; Stanford, CA	ACCN	L 20–35	16,540
November 8	1:30 p.m.	at North Carolina	Kenan Stadium; Chapel Hill, NC	The CW	L 15–20	50,500
November 22	4:30 p.m.	California	Stanford Stadium; Stanford, CA (Big Game)	ACCN	W 31–10	50,039
November 29	7:30 p.m.	No. 9 Notre Dame*	Stanford Stadium; Stanford, CA (rivalry)	ESPN	L 20–49	27,456
*Non-conference game; ^{†}Homecoming; Rankings from AP Poll (and CFP Rankings, after November 4) - Released prior to game; All times are in Pacific time

== Game summaries ==
=== at Hawaii ===
Stanford Cardinal (0–0) at Hawaii Rainbow Warriors (0–0) – Game summary

Quarter	1	2	3	4	Total
Cardinal	10	3	0	7	20
Rainbow Warriors	7	7	3	6	23

at Clarence T. C. Ching Athletics Complex • Honolulu, Hawaii

- Date: August 23
- Game time: 1:30 p.m. HST
- Game weather: Sunny and breezy, 89 °F (32 °C)
- Game attendance: 15,194
- Referee: Justin Elliott
- TV announcers (CBS): Rich Waltz (play-by-play), Logan Ryan (color), and Tiffany Blackmon (sideline)

Game information

First quarter

- STAN – Emmet Kenney 23-yard field goal, 7:14. Cardinal 3–0. Drive: 15 plays, 70 yards, 7:46.
- STAN – Wilfredo Aybar fumble recovery in end zone (Emmet Kenney kick), 7:08. Cardinal 10–0.
- HAW – Pofele Ashlock 3-yard pass from Micah Alejado (Kansei Matsuzawa kick), 2:19. Cardinal 10–7. Drive: 6 plays, 58 yards, 2:22.

Second quarter

- STAN – Emmet Kenney 46-yard field goal, 3:39. Cardinal 13–7. Drive: 10 plays, 37 yards, 4:58.
- HAW – Jackson Harris 19-yard pass from Micah Alejado (Kansei Matsuzawa kick), 0:42. Rainbow Warriors 14–13. Drive: 9 plays, 75 yards, 2:57.

Third quarter

- HAW – Kansei Matsuzawa 40-yard field goal, 6:25. Rainbow Warriors 17–13. Drive: 11 plays, 36 yards, 4:18.

Fourth quarter

- STAN – Micah Ford 2-yard run (Emmet Kenney kick), 9:41. Cardinal 20–17. Drive: 20 plays, 85 yards, 9:37.
- HAW – Kansei Matsuzawa 37-yard field goal, 2:01. Tied 20–20. Drive: 10 plays, 50 yards, 3:57.
- HAW – Kansei Matsuzawa 38-yard field goal, 0:00. Rainbow Warriors 23–20. Drive: 9 plays, 52 yards, 1:33.

Statistics	STAN	HAW
First downs	21	20
Total yards	286	306
Rushes–yards	43–177	24–96
Passing yards	109	210
Passing: comp–att–int	15–30–1	27–40–0
Turnovers	1	0
Time of possession	36:07	23:53

Team	Category	Player	Statistics
Stanford	Passing	Ben Gulbranson	15–30, 109 yards, INT
Stanford	Rushing	Micah Ford	26 carries, 113 yards, TD
Stanford	Receiving	Chico Holt	1 reception, 36 yards
Hawaii	Passing	Micah Alejado	27–39, 210 yards, 2 TD
Hawaii	Rushing	Cam Barfield	6 carries, 45 yards
Hawaii	Receiving	Pofele Ashlock	9 receptions, 69 yards, TD

=== at BYU ===
Stanford Cardinal (0–1) at BYU Cougars (1–0) – Game summary

Quarter	1	2	3	4	Total
Cardinal	0	0	0	3	3
Cougars	6	8	10	3	27

at LaVell Edwards Stadium • Provo, Utah

- Date: September 6
- Game time: 7:15 p.m.
- Game weather: Clear Skies, 74 °F (23 °C), Winds 3mph NE
- Game attendance: 64,692
- Referee: Nate Black
- TV announcers (ESPN): Mark Jones (play-by-play), Roddy Jones (analyst), and Quint Kessenich (sideline)

Game information

First quarter

- BYU – Bear Bachmeier 2-yard run, (run failed), 3:25. BYU 6–0. Drive: 6 plays, 85 yards, 3:16.

Second quarter

- BYU – Will Ferrin 36-yard field goal, 14:56. BYU 9–0. Drive: 3 plays, 1 yard, 2:03.
- BYU – Will Ferrin 30-yard field goal, 10:52. BYU 12–0. Drive: 5 plays, -7 yards, 1:59.
- BYU – Team safety, 5:14. BYU 14–0.

Third quarter

- BYU – Will Ferrin 21-yard field goal, 8:56. BYU 17–0. Drive: 13 plays, 72 yards, 6:04.
- BYU – Sione Moa 8-yard run (Will Ferrin kick), 3:36. BYU 24–0. Drive: 5 plays, 43 yards, 2:21.

Fourth quarter

- STAN – Emmet Kenney 26-yard field goal, 10:31. BYU 24–3. Drive: 15 plays, 67 yards, 8:05.
- BYU – Will Ferrin 23-yard field goal, 6:33. BYU 27–3. Drive: 8 plays, 69 yards, 3:58.

Statistics	STAN	BYU
First downs	12	18
Plays–yards	56–161	68–332
Rushes–yards	24–19	41–157
Passing yards	142	175
Passing: comp–att–int	17–32–2	17–27
Turnovers	3	0
Time of possession	25:04	34:56

Team	Category	Player	Statistics
Stanford	Passing	Ben Gulbranson	17/32, 142 yards, 2 INT
Stanford	Rushing	Micah Ford	12 carries, 21 yards
Stanford	Receiving	Bryce Farrell	5 receptions, 68 yards
BYU	Passing	Bear Bachmeier	17/27, 175 yards
BYU	Rushing	LJ Martin	18 carries, 110 yards
BYU	Receiving	Chase Roberts	5 receptions, 84 yards

=== vs Boston College ===
Boston College Eagles (1–1) at Stanford Cardinal (0–2) – Game summary

Quarter	1	2	3	4	Total
Eagles	0	20	0	0	20
Cardinal	6	14	7	3	30

at Stanford Stadium • Stanford, California

- Date: September 13
- Game time: 7:30 p.m.
- Game weather: Sunny
- Game attendance: 22,162
- Referee: Mike Roche
- TV announcers (ACCN): Wes Durham (play-by-play), Steve Addazio (analyst) and Dana Boyle (sideline)

Game information

First quarter

- STAN – Emmet Kenney 23-yard field goal, 7:10. Cardinal 3–0. Drive: 13 plays, 70 yards, 7:50.
- STAN – Emmet Kenney 35-yard field goal, 1:04. Cardinal 6–0. Drive: 5 plays, 42 yards, 2:13.

Second quarter

- BC – Luca Lombardo 51-yard field goal, 13:38. Cardinal 6–3. Drive: 8 plays, 43 yards, 2:26.
- BC – Turbo Richard 49-yard pass from Dylan Lonergan (Luca Lombardo kick), 10:43. Eagles 10–6. Drive: 5 plays, 73 yards, 2:02.
- BC – Jordan McDonald 2-yard run (Luca Lombardo kick), 8:04. Eagles 17–6. Drive: 4 plays, 74 yards, 1:35.
- STAN – Sam Roush 69-yard pass from Ben Gulbranson (Emmet Kenney kick), 1:47. Eagles 17–13. Drive: 3 plays, 76 yards, 0:54.
- STAN – Collin Wright 19-yard interception return (Emmet Kenney kick), 1:29. Cardinal 20–17.
- BC – Luca Lombardo 31-yard field goal, 0:00. Tied 20–20. Drive: 12 plays, 62 yards, 1:29.

Third quarter

- STAN – Micah Ford 5-yard run (Emmet Kenney kick), 1:35. Cardinal 27–20. Drive: 2 plays, 80 yards, 0:57.

Fourth quarter

- STAN – Emmet Kenney 26-yard field goal, 11:26. Cardinal 30–20. Drive: 8 plays, 48 yards, 3:34.

Statistics	BC	STAN
First downs	19	15
Plays–yards	67–389	56–409
Rushes–yards	23–56	34–223
Passing yards	333	186
Passing: comp–att–int	30–44–1	13–22–0
Turnovers	3	0
Time of possession	28:16	31:44

Team	Category	Player	Statistics
Boston College	Passing	Dylan Lonergan	30/44, 333 yards, TD, INT
Boston College	Rushing	Turbo Richard	14 carries, 55 yards
Boston College	Receiving	Reed Harris	7 receptions, 141 yards
Stanford	Passing	Ben Gulbranson	13/22, 186 yards, TD
Stanford	Rushing	Micah Ford	17 carries, 157 yards, TD
Stanford	Receiving	Sam Roush	3 receptions, 79 yards, TD

=== at Virginia ===
Stanford Cardinal (1–2) at Virginia Cavaliers (2–1) – Game summary

Quarter	1	2	3	4	Total
Cardinal	7	7	6	0	20
Cavaliers	21	7	10	10	48

at Scott Stadium • Charlottesville, Virginia

- Date: September 20
- Game time: 7:30 p.m.
- Game weather:
- Game attendance: 36,223
- Referee:
- TV announcers (ACCN): Wes Durham (play-by-play), Steve Addazio (analyst), and Dana Boyle (sideline)

Game information

First quarter

- UVA – Trell Harris 3-yard pass from Chandler Morris (Will Bettridge kick), 11:08. Cavaliers 7–0. Drive: 7 plays, 65 yards, 2:26.
- STAN – Benji Blackburn 5-yard pass from Ben Gulbranson (Emmet Kenney kick), 8:27. Tied 7–7. Drive: 5 plays, 76 yards, 2:36.
- UVA – Trell Harris 75-yard pass from Chandler Morris (Will Bettridge kick), 8:17. Cavaliers 14–7. Drive: 1 play, 75 yards, 0:10.
- UVA – Trell Harris 27-yard pass from Chandler Morris (Will Bettridge kick), 3:36. Cavaliers 21–7. Drive: 7 plays, 72 yards, 3:20.

Second quarter

- UVA – Chandler Morris 13-yard run (Will Bettridge kick), 9:05. Cavaliers 28–7. Drive: 12 plays, 88 yards, 6:00.
- STAN – Micah Ford 3-yard run (Emmet Kenney kick), 0:55. Cavaliers 28–14. Drive: 8 plays, 80 yards, 1:29.

Third quarter

- UVA – Sage Ennis 13-yard pass from Chandler Morris (Will Bettridge kick), 11:21. Cavaliers 35–14. Drive: 7 plays, 68 yards, 3:32.
- UVA – Will Bettridge 28-yard field goal, 5:35. Cavaliers 38–14. Drive: 7 plays, 29 yards, 3:51.
- STAN – Bryce Farrell 68-yard pass from Ben Gulbranson (pass failed), 4:18. Cavaliers 38–20. Drive: 3 plays, 75 yards, 1:17.

Fourth quarter

- UVA – Will Bettridge 26-yard field goal, 12:26. Cavaliers 41–20. Drive: 9 plays, 52 yards, 3:50.
- UVA – Eli Wood 4-yard pass from Daniel Kaelin (Will Bettridge kick), 4:26. Cavaliers 48–20. Drive: 8 plays, 36 yards, 5:09.

Statistics	STAN	UVA
First downs	15	29
Plays–yards	66–323	72–564
Rushes–yards	30–37	40–210
Passing yards	286	384
Passing: comp–att–int	20–29–0	24–32–0
Turnovers	1	0
Time of possession	25:12	34:48

Team	Category	Player	Statistics
Stanford	Passing	Ben Gulbranson	20/29, 286 yards, 2 TD
Stanford	Rushing	Micah Ford	13 carries, 44 yards, TD
Stanford	Receiving	Bryce Farrell	4 receptions, 135 yards, TD
Virginia	Passing	Chandler Morris	23/31, 380 yards, 4 TD
Virginia	Rushing	J'Mari Taylor	15 carries, 85 yards
Virginia	Receiving	Trell Harris	4 receptions, 145 yards, 3 TD

=== vs San Jose State (Bill Walsh Legacy Game) ===
San Jose State Spartans (1–2) at Stanford Cardinal (1–3) – Game summary

Quarter	1	2	3	4	Total
Spartans	10	10	0	9	29
Cardinal	7	7	0	16	30

at Stanford Stadium • Stanford, California

- Date: September 27
- Game time: 4:30 p.m.
- Game weather:
- Game attendance: 26,357
- Referee: Christian Watson
- TV announcers (ACCN): Jorge Sedano (play-by-play), Rodney McLeod (analyst) and Victoria Arlen (sideline reporter)

Game information

First quarter

- STAN – Cole Tabb 8-yard run (Emmet Kenney kick), 7:42. Cardinal 7–0. Drive: 11 plays, 81 yards, 7:12.
- SJSU – Denis Lynch 41-yard field goal, 4:46. Cardinal 7–3. Drive: 7 plays, 61 yards, 2:52.
- SJSU – Danny Scudero 10-yard pass from Walker Eget (Denis Lynch kick), 0:55. Spartans 10–7. Drive: 5 plays, 24 yards, 2:37.

Second quarter

- SJSU – Denis Lynch 36-yard field goal, 7:59. Spartans 13–7. Drive: 5 plays, 52 yards, 2:27.
- STAN – Sam Roush 15-yard pass from Ben Gulbranson (Emmet Kenney kick), 4:06. Cardinal 14–13. Drive: 7 plays, 77 yards, 3:49.
- SJSU – Kyri Shoels 29-yard pass from Walker Eget (Denis Lynch kick), 1:59. Spartans 20–14. Drive: 4 plays, 75 yards, 2:07.

Third quarter

- No scoring plays.

Fourth quarter

- SJSU – Danny Scudero 5-yard pass from Walker Eget (pass failed), 14:15. Spartans 26–14. Drive: 8 plays, 61 yards, 3:43.
- STAN – Myles Libman 14-yard pass from Ben Gulbranson (Emmet Kenney kick), 12:19. Spartans 26–21. Drive: 5 plays, 75 yards, 1:56.
- SJSU – Denis Lynch 31-yard field goal, 7:51. Spartans 29–21. Drive: 10 plays, 62 yards, 4:28.
- STAN – Emmet Kenney 36-yard field goal, 5:54. Spartans 29–24. Drive: 5 plays, 54 yards, 1:57.
- STAN – Sedrick Irvin 1-yard run (pass failed), 0:19. Cardinal 30–29. Drive: 12 plays, 80 yards, 2:26.

Statistics	SJSU	STAN
First downs	27	23
Plays–yards	72–524	69–481
Rushes–yards	14–51	26–37
Passing yards	473	444
Passing: comp–att–int	36–58–0	29–43–0
Turnovers	1	1
Time of possession	30:53	29:07

Team	Category	Player	Statistics
San Jose State	Passing	Walker Eget	36/58, 473 yards, 3 TD
San Jose State	Rushing	Walker Eget	2 carries, 19 yards
San Jose State	Receiving	Kyri Shoels	10 receptions, 147 yards, TD
Stanford	Passing	Ben Gulbranson	29/43, 444 yards, 2 TD
Stanford	Rushing	Cole Tabb	12 carries, 48 yards, TD
Stanford	Receiving	CJ Williams	11 receptions, 130 yards

=== at SMU ===
Stanford Cardinal (2–3) at SMU Mustangs (3–2) – Game summary

Quarter	1	2	3	4	Total
Cardinal	0	7	3	0	10
Mustangs	7	10	7	10	34

at Gerald J. Ford Stadium • Dallas, Texas

- Date: October 11
- Game time: 9:00 a.m.
- Game weather: Sunny, 78 degrees
- Game attendance: 30,654
- Referee: Nate Black
- TV announcers (The CW): Thom Brennaman (play-by-play), Will Blackmon (analyst) and Wes Bryant (sideline)

Game information

First quarter

- SMU – Derrick McFall 19-yard pass from Kevin Jennings (Sam Keltner kick), 2:39. Mustangs 7–0. Drive: 13 plays, 75 yards, 5:16.

Second quarter

- SMU – Sam Keltner 32-yard field goal, 12:30. Mustangs 10–0. Drive: 8 plays, 65 yards, 3:06.
- SMU – Chris Johnson Jr. 87-yard run (Sam Keltner kick), 0:35. Mustangs 17–0. Drive: 6 plays, 98 yards, 2:09.
- STAN – CJ Williams 14-yard pass from Ben Gulbranson (Emmet Kenney kick), 0:02. Mustangs 17–7. Drive: 4 plays, 75 yards, 0:33.

Third quarter

- SMU – Chris Johnson Jr. 42-yard pass from Kevin Jennings (Sam Keltner kick), 8:22. Mustangs 24–7. Drive: 5 plays, 82 yards, 2:07.
- STAN – Emmet Kenney 34-yard field goal, 0:34. Mustangs 24–10. Drive: 11 plays, 50 yards, 4:31.

Fourth quarter

- SMU – Justin Medlock 96-yard interception return (Sam Keltner kick), 6:05. Mustangs 31–10.
- SMU – Sam Keltner 48-yard field goal, 1:32. Mustangs 34–10. Drive: 9 plays, 45 yards, 4:03.

Statistics	STAN	SMU
First downs	23	17
Plays–yards	74–353	54–369
Rushes–yards	33–75	24–122
Passing yards	278	247
Passing: comp–att–int	22–41–1	22–30–0
Turnovers	2	0
Time of possession	36:30	23:30

Team	Category	Player	Statistics
Stanford	Passing	Ben Gulbranson	22/40, 278 yards, TD, INT
Stanford	Rushing	Cole Tabb	9 carries, 62 yards
Stanford	Receiving	CJ Williams	7 receptions, 109 yards, TD
SMU	Passing	Kevin Jennings	22/30, 247 yards, 2 TD
SMU	Rushing	Chris Johnson Jr.	5 carries, 96 yards, TD
SMU	Receiving	Jordan Hudson	5 receptions, 87 yards

=== vs Florida State ===
Florida State Seminoles (3–3) at Stanford Cardinal (2–4) – Game summary

Quarter	1	2	3	4	Total
Seminoles	0	10	0	3	13
Cardinal	3	10	7	0	20

at Stanford Stadium • Stanford, California

- Date: October 18
- Game time: 7:30 p.m.
- Game weather: Sunny
- Game attendance: 26,470
- Referee: Darryl DeBerry
- TV announcers (ESPN): Roy Philpott (play-by-play), Sam Acho (analyst), and Taylor Davis (sideline)

Game information

First quarter

- (7:41) STAN – Emmet Kenney 32-yard field goal (Drive: 13 plays, 68 yards, 6:04; Stanford 3–0)

Second quarter

- (14:34) FSU – Jake Weinberg 39-yard field goal (Drive: 12 plays, 54 yards, 4:00; Tied 3–3)
- (9:13) STAN – CJ Williams 7-yard pass from Ben Gulbranson, Emmet Kenney kick (Drive: 11 plays, 75 yards, 5:21; Stanford 10–3)
- (2:53) STAN – Emmet Kenney 26-yard field goal (Drive: 6 plays, 24 yards, 2:37; Stanford 13–3)
- (0:40) FSU – Tommy Castellanos 8-yard run, Jake Weinberg kick (Drive: 10 plays, 75 yards, 2:12; Stanford 13–10)

Third quarter

- (3:02) STAN – Cole Tabb 1-yard run, Emmet Kenney kick (Drive: 13 plays, 94 yards, 7:03; Stanford 20–10)

Fourth quarter

- (9:21) FSU – Jake Weinberg 33-yard field goal (Drive: 9 plays, 44 yards, 3:43; Stanford 20–13)

Statistics	FSU	STAN
First downs	22	19
Plays–yards	78–444	67–293
Rushes–yards	43–133	42–132
Passing yards	311	161
Passing: comp–att–int	18–35–0	12–25–1
Turnovers	0	1
Time of possession	27:04	32:56

Team	Category	Player	Statistics
Florida State	Passing	Tommy Castellanos	14/28, 242 yards
Florida State	Rushing	Gavin Sawchuk	20 carries, 70 yards
Florida State	Receiving	Micahi Danzy	3 receptions, 106 yards
Stanford	Passing	Ben Gulbranson	6/13, 90 yards, TD, INT
Stanford	Rushing	Cole Tabb	28 carries, 118 yards, TD
Stanford	Receiving	Sam Roush	6 receptions, 63 yards

=== at No. 9 Miami (FL) ===
Stanford Cardinal (3–4) at No. 9 Miami Hurricanes (5–1) – Game summary

Quarter	1	2	3	4	Total
Cardinal	7	0	0	0	7
No. 9 Hurricanes	0	7	21	14	42

at Hard Rock Stadium • Miami Gardens, Florida

- Date: October 25
- Game time: 4:00 p.m.
- Game weather: Cloudy
- Game attendance: 63,892
- Referee: Mike Roche
- TV announcers (ESPN): Mark Jones (play-by-play), Roddy Jones (analyst), and Quint Kessenich (sideline)

Game information

First quarter

- (4:35) STAN – Caden High 9-yard pass from Ben Gulbranson, (Emmet Kenney kick) (Drive: 12 plays, 74 yards, 5:23; Stanford 7–0)

Second quarter

- (1:15) MIA – CJ Daniels 5-yard pass from Carson Beck, (Carter Davis kick) (Drive: 15 plays, 71 yards, 7:26; Tied 7–7)

Third quarter

- (9:34) MIA – Mark Fletcher Jr. 1-yard run, (Carter Davis kick) (Drive: 6 plays, 40 yards, 2:22; Miami 14–7)
- (3:48) MIA – Mark Fletcher Jr. 3-yard run, (Carter Davis kick) (Drive: 1 play, 3 yards, 0:05; Miami 21–7)
- (0:32) MIA – Mark Fletcher Jr. 7-yard run, (Carter Davis kick) (Drive: 4 plays, 45 yards, 1:59; Miami 28–7)

Fourth quarter

- (9:34) MIA – Jordan Lyle 17-yard run, (Bert Auburn kick) (Drive: 8 plays, 76 yards, 4:32; Miami 35–7)
- (0:26) MIA – Girard Pringle Jr. 3-yard run, (Bert Auburn kick) (Drive: 12 plays, 55 yards, 5:53; Miami 42–7)

Statistics	STAN	MIA
First downs	8	25
Plays–yards	53–144	74–404
Rushes–yards	27–55	44–199
Passing yards	89	205
Passing: comp–att–int	12–26–2	22–30–0
Turnovers	2	0
Time of possession	23:18	36:42

Team	Category	Player	Statistics
Stanford	Passing	Ben Gulbranson	9/21, 50 yards, TD, 2 INT
Stanford	Rushing	Cole Tabb	19 carries, 64 yards
Stanford	Receiving	Caden High	3 receptions, 36 yards, TD
Miami (FL)	Passing	Carson Beck	21/28, 189 yards, TD
Miami (FL)	Rushing	Mark Fletcher Jr.	23 carries, 106 yards, 3 TD
Miami (FL)	Receiving	Tony Johnson	3 receptions, 69 yards

=== vs Pittsburgh ===
Pittsburgh Panthers (6–2) at Stanford Cardinal (3–5) – Game summary

Quarter	1	2	3	4	Total
Panthers	7	14	14	0	35
Cardinal	10	3	0	7	20

at Stanford Stadium • Stanford, California

- Date: November 1
- Game time: 12:30 p.m.
- Game weather: Sunny
- Game attendance: 16,540
- Referee: Nate Black
- TV announcers (ACCN): Chris Cotter (play-by-play), Max Browne (analyst) and Kendra Douglas (sideline)

Game information

First quarter

- PITT – Kenny Johnson 17-yard pass from Mason Heintschel (Trey Butkowski kick), 11:56. Panthers 7–0. Drive: 4 plays, 35 yards, 1:33.
- STAN – Emmet Kenney 39-yard field goal, 9:35. Panthers 7–3. Drive: 7 plays, 62 yards, 1:35.
- STAN – CJ Williams 35-yard pass from Ben Gulbranson (Emmet Kenney kick), 6:20. Cardinal 10–7. Drive: 3 plays, 36 yards, 0:41.

Second quarter

- PITT – Deuce Spann 4-yard run (Trey Butkowski kick), 14:56. Panthers 14–10. Drive: 9 plays, 60 yards, 3:23.
- PITT – Raphael Williams Jr. 5-yard pass from Mason Heintschel (Trey Butkowski kick), 1:47. Panthers 21–10. Drive: 7 plays, 50 yards, 2:23.
- STAN – Emmet Kenney 45-yard field goal, 0:00. Panthers 21–13. Drive: 10 plays, 48 yards, 1:47.

Third quarter

- PITT – Jake Overman 14-yard pass from Mason Heintschel (Trey Butkowski kick), 5:54. Panthers 28–13. Drive: 7 plays, 89 yards, 2:55.
- PITT – Shawn Lee Jr. 30-yard interception return (Trey Butkowski kick), 5:46. Panthers 35–13.

Fourth quarter

- STAN – CJ Williams 19-yard pass from Elijah Brown (AJ Seidler kick), 0:18. Panthers 35–20. Drive: 11 plays, 97 yards, 3:29.

Statistics	PITT	STAN
First downs	25	18
Plays–yards	73–466	71–326
Rushes–yards	35–162	27––10
Passing yards	304	336
Passing: comp–att–int	23–38–2	27–44–3
Turnovers	4	3
Time of possession	30:30	29:30

Team	Category	Player	Statistics
Pittsburgh	Passing	Mason Heintschel	23/38, 304 yards, 3 TD, 2 INT
Pittsburgh	Rushing	Ja'Kyrian Turner	22 carries, 127 yards
Pittsburgh	Receiving	Kenny Johnson	4 receptions, 71 yards, TD
Stanford	Passing	Ben Gulbranson	17/30, 228 yards, TD, 3 INT
Stanford	Rushing	Sedrick Irvin	8 carries, 24 yards
Stanford	Receiving	CJ Williams	7 receptions, 122 yards, 2 TD

=== at North Carolina ===
Stanford Cardinal (3–6) at North Carolina Tar Heels (3–5) – Game summary

Quarter	1	2	3	4	Total
Cardinal	0	3	0	12	15
Tar Heels	3	0	7	10	20

at Kenan Stadium • Chapel Hill, North Carolina

- Date: November 8
- Game time: 4:30 p.m.
- Game weather: Cloudy
- Game attendance: 50,500
- Referee: Jerry Magallanes
- TV announcers (The CW): Thom Brennaman (play-by-play), Will Blackmon (analyst) and Wes Bryant (sideline)

Game information

First quarter

- (5:49) UNC – Rece Verhoff 27-yard field goal (Drive: 4 plays, -2 yards, 0:56, North Carolina 3–0)

Second quarter

- (0:00) STAN – Emmet Kenney 38-yard field goal (Drive: 16 plays, 56 yards, 4:27, Tied 3–3)

Third quarter

- (7:43) UNC – Davion Gause 20-yard pass from Gio Lopez, Rece Verhoff kick (Drive: 12 plays, 75 yards, 7:17, North Carolina 10–3)

Fourth quarter

- (14:16) UNC – Rece Verhoff 48-yard field goal (Drive: 4 plays, 6 yards, 1:52, North Carolina 13–3)
- (12:04) UNC – Jordan Shipp 55-yard pass from Gio Lopez, Rece Verhoff kick (Drive: 3 plays, 60 yards, 1:01, North Carolina 20–3)
- (8:28) STAN – Cole Tabb 1-yard run, two-point pass conversion failed (Drive: 9 plays, 75 yards, 3:36, North Carolina 20–9)
- (1:48) STAN – CJ Williams 24-yard pass from Elijah Brown, two-point run conversion failed (Drive: 9 plays, 80 yards, 3:07, North Carolina 20–15)

Statistics	STAN	UNC
First downs	22	13
Plays–yards	74–320	52–253
Rushes–yards	35–36	27–50
Passing yards	284	203
Passing: comp–att–int	27–39–1	18–25–0
Turnovers	2	1
Time of possession	32:37	27:23

Team	Category	Player	Statistics
Stanford	Passing	Elijah Brown	27/39, 284 yards, TD, INT
Stanford	Rushing	Micah Ford	17 carries, 68 yards
Stanford	Receiving	Caden High	10 receptions, 102 yards
North Carolina	Passing	Gio Lopez	18/25, 203 yards, 2 TD
North Carolina	Rushing	Davion Gause	11 carries, 28 yards
North Carolina	Receiving	Jordan Shipp	5 receptions, 83 yards, TD

=== vs California (Big Game) ===
California Golden Bears (6-4) at Stanford Cardinal (3-7) – Game summary

Quarter	1	2	3	4	Total
Golden Bears	3	7	0	0	10
Cardinal	0	14	3	14	31

at Stanford Stadium • Stanford, California

- Date: November 22
- Game time: 4:30 p.m.
- Game weather: Sunny
- Game attendance: 50,039
- Referee: Nate Black
- TV announcers (ACCN): Chris Cotter (play-by-play), Max Browne (analyst) and Kendra Douglas (sideline)

Game information

First quarter

- (6:10) CAL – Abram Murray 40-yard field goal (Drive: 11 plays, 56 yards, 5:46; California 3–0)

Second quarter

- (12:57) STA – Jay Green 49-yard fumble recovery, Emmet Kenney kick (Stanford 7–3)
- (4:38) CAL – Jaron-Keawe Sagapolutele 7-yard run, Chase Meyer kick (Drive: 15 plays, 75 yards, 8:19; California 10–7)
- (0:58) STA – Darrius Davis 17-yard fumble recovery, Emmet Kenney kick (Stanford 14–10)

Third quarter

- (2:19) STA – Emmet Kenney 36-yard field goal (Drive: 7 plays, 31 yards, 3:34; Stanford 17–10)

Fourth quarter

- (14:56) STA – Micah Ford 4-yard run, Emmet Kenney kick (Drive: 4 plays, 20 yards, 1:35; Stanford 24–10)
- (10:01) STA – CJ Williams 34-yard pass from Elijah Brown, Emmet Kenney kick (Drive: 5 plays, 58 yards, 3:26; Stanford 31–10)

Statistics	CAL	STAN
First downs	15	17
Plays–yards	76–297	57–282
Rushes–yards	26–12	37–159
Passing yards	285	123
Passing: comp–att–int	34–50–0	10–20–0
Turnovers	3	0
Time of possession	32:42	26:20

Team	Category	Player	Statistics
California	Passing	Jaron-Keawe Sagapolutele	33/49, 269 yards
California	Rushing	Kendrick Raphael	15 carries, 47 yards
California	Receiving	Trond Grizzell	9 receptions, 104 yards
Stanford	Passing	Elijah Brown	10/20, 123 yards, TD
Stanford	Rushing	Micah Ford	29 carries, 150 yards, TD
Stanford	Receiving	CJ Williams	5 receptions, 76 yards, TD

=== vs No. 9 Notre Dame (rivalry) ===
No. 9 Notre Dame Fighting Irish (9-2) at Stanford Cardinal (4–7) – Game summary

Quarter	1	2	3	4	Total
No. 9 Fighting Irish	14	21	7	7	49
Cardinal	0	3	3	14	20

at Stanford Stadium • Stanford, California

- Date: November 29
- Game time: 7:30 p.m.
- Game weather: Sunny
- Game attendance: 27,456
- Referee: Darryl DeBarry
- TV announcers (ESPN): Dave Flemming (play-by-play), Brock Osweiler (analyst) and Stormy Buonantony (sideline)

Game information

First quarter

- (8:43) ND – Jeremiyah Love 2-yard run, Erik Schmidt kick (Drive: 11 plays, 66 yards, 6:14, Notre Dame 7–0)
- (1:52) ND – Jadarian Price 1-yard run, Erik Schmidt kick (Drive: 11 plays, 61 yards, 5:27, Notre Dame 14–0)

Second quarter

- (14:33) ND – Luke Talich 84-yard pass from Joshua Burnham, Erik Schmidt kick (Drive: 4 plays, 85 yards, 0:55, Notre Dame 21–0)
- (7:26) ND – Aneyas Williams 2-yard run, Erik Schmidt kick (Drive: 8 plays, 54 yards, 3:21, Notre Dame 28–0)
- (2:38) STAN – Emmet Kenney 39-yard field goal (Drive: 12 plays, 54 yards, 4:48, Notre Dame 28–3)
- (0:17) ND – Jadarian Price 12-yard pass from CJ Carr, Erik Schmidt kick (Drive: 9 plays, 45 yards, 1:04, Notre Dame 35–3)

Third quarter

- (12:43) ND – Jordan Faison 6-yard pass from CJ Carr, Erik Schmidt kick (Drive: 4 plays, 77 yards, 1:51, Notre Dame 42–3)
- (2:09) STAN – Emmet Kenney 44-yard field goal (Drive: 15 plays, 61 yards, 7:36, Notre Dame 42–6)

Fourth quarter

- (12:15) STAN – Bryce Farrell 9-yard pass from Elijah Brown, Emmet Kenney kick (Drive: 7 plays, 91 yards, 2:45, Notre Dame 42–13)
- (9:08) ND – Aneyas Williams 51-yard run, Erik Schmidt kick (Drive: 6 plays, 75 yards, 3:07, Notre Dame 49–13)
- (4:00) STAN – Marcus Brown 3-yard pass from Charlie Mirer, Emmet Kenney kick (Drive: 12 plays, 80 yards, 5:04, Notre Dame 49–20)

Statistics	ND	STAN
First downs	24	16
Plays–yards	74–524	70–312
Rushes–yards	38–187	30–86
Passing yards	337	226
Passing: comp–att–int	23–36–0	20–40–1
Turnovers	0	1
Time of possession	30:35	29:25

Team	Category	Player	Statistics
Notre Dame	Passing	CJ Carr	17/27, 205 yards, 2 TD
Notre Dame	Rushing	Aneyas Williams	10 carries, 83 yards, 2 TD
Notre Dame	Receiving	Luke Talich	1 reception, 84 yards, TD
Stanford	Passing	Elijah Brown	18/37, 204 yards, TD, INT
Stanford	Rushing	Cole Tabb	11 carries, 32 yards
Stanford	Receiving	Sam Roush	4 receptions, 73 yards

== Roster ==
2025 Stanford Cardinal football team roster
Players
Coaches
Offense

Pos.	#	Name	Class
WR	0	Caden High	Jr
QB	2	Elijah Brown	RFr
WR	3	CJ Williams	Sr
WR	4	Jordan Onovughe	RSo
RB	5	Chris Davis Jr.	So
RB	6	Tuna Altahir	GS
QB	9	Myles Jackson	Jr
QB	10	Dylan Rizk	RSo
WR	11	Bryce Farrell	GS
WR	13	Liam Thorpe	Fr
QB	15	Ben Gulbranson	RSr
QB	17	Charlie Mirer	Sr
WR	19	David Pantelis	GS
RB	20	Micah Ford	So
WR	25	Marcus Brown	RFr
RB	26	Sedrick Irvin	Jr
WR	32	Owen van Loben Sels	RFr
RB	33	Cole Tabb	RFr
RB	34	Champ Hampton	Jr
WR	37	Myles Libman	Jr
WR	39	Tyler Kuo	Jr
WR	40	Jason Thompson	RJr
OL	51	Ziron Brown	RFr
OL	53	Nathan Mejia	RJr
OL	55	Simione Pale	Jr
OL	56	Hayden Gunter	RFr
OL	58	Kahlil House	So
OL	59	Charlie Hoitink	RFr
OL	60	Nick Fattig	RSo
G	62	Josh Williams	Fr
OL	63	Carson Caplan	RFr
OL	66	Niki Prongos	RJr
G	68	Zak Yamauchi	Fr
OT	71	Emeka Ugorji	Fr
OL	73	Charlie Symonds	Jr
OL	74	Fisher Anderson	Sr
OT, G	76	Jack Leyrer	GS
OL	79	Kai Greer	RFr
TE	80	Brendan Doyle	GS
WR	81	Jonathony Hall	Fr
TE	83	Reiman Zebert	Fr
TE	84	Chico Holt	RSo
TE	85	Zach Giuliano	Fr
TE	86	Sam Roush	Sr
TE	87	Aiden Black	Fr
TE	88	Benji Blackburn	So
TE	89	Griffin Waiss	Sr

Defense

Pos.	#	Name	Class
ILB	0	Jahsiah Galvan	RJr
OLB	2	Dylan Stephenson	RFr
S	3	Jaylen'Dai Sumlin	So
S	5	Jay Green	RJr
CB	6	Collin Wright	Sr
CB	8	Cam Richardson	So
CB	9	Brandon Nicholson	So
CB	10	Jordan Washington	GS
OLB	11	Tevarua Tafiti	Sr
OLB	14	Wilfredo Aybar	GS
S	15	Donte Utu	Fr
S	17	Omari Gaines	Fr
S	21	Scotty Edwards	Sr
S	22	Ché Ojarikre	RSo
ILB	23	Hunter Barth	RSr
NB	24	Lonnie McAllister III	Fr
ILB	25	Bo Tate	RFr
CB	26	Chris Garland	Fr
CB	27	Breylan Thompson	So
CB	28	Sam Neely III	RFr
S	29	Darrius Davis	So
ILB	30	Ese Dubre	GS
CB	31	Aaron Morris	Jr
S	32	Mitch Leigber	GS
CB	34	Javion Randall	RFr
ILB	35	Matt Rose	Sr
OLB	36	Tre Williams	Jr
LB	38	Zach Johnson	RSo
S	39	Charlie Eckhardt	RFr
OLB	40	Mickey Vaccarello	Fr
ILB	41	Anson Pulsipher	Sr
DL	42	Jacobi Murray	So
ILB	43	Landon McComber	Fr
OLB	44	Ernest Cooper	Sr
DL	45	Omar Staples	Jr
ILB	48	Drew Cunningham	RFr
OLB	49	Gabe Kaminski	Fr
DL	50	R.J. Gaskins	Jr
ILB	51	Sam Mattingly	So
ILB	52	Maxwell Richardson	RFr
ILB	54	Preston Jernegan	RFr
DL	55	Joe Asiain	RFr
ILB	56	Miles McGee	Jr
DT	57	Kole Briehler	Fr
DL	58	Brendan Delaney	RFr
DL	75	Braden Marceau-Olayinka	Jr
OLB	90	Gavin Geweniger	Jr
DL	91	Clay Patterson	GS
DE	94	Anthony Franklin	GS
DE	95	Adam Shovlin	Fr
DL	96	Connor Bachhuber	RFr
DL	97	Zach Rowell	Sr
DE	98	Zach Buckey	GS
DL	99	Benedict Umeh	RFr

Special teams

Pos.	#	Name	Class
K	13	Emmet Kenney	GS
K	19	London Bironas	Fr
P	37	Aidan Flintoft	Jr
LS	47	Alejandro Chavez	Sr
K	92	AJ Seidler	RFr
LS	93	Peyton Warford	Sr

Head coach

- Frank Reich (interim)

Coordinators/assistant coaches

- Nate Byham – Offensive coordinator/Tight ends
- Andy Thompson – Assistant head coach/ co-defensive coordinator/Inside linebackers
- Bobby April III – Defensive coordinator/outside linebackers
- Malcolm Agnew – Running backs
- Tyler Osborne – Wide receivers/passing game coordinator/assistant quarterbacks
- Ross Kolodziej – Defensive line
- Paul Williams – Cornerbacks
- Al Netter – Offensive line
- Kodi Whitfield – Safeties
- Thomas Merkle – Quarterbacks
- Corey Edsall – Assistant/tight ends
- Tsuyoshi Kawata – Offensive quality control analyst
- Vavae Malepeai – Offensive quality control analyst
- Joseph Montag – Senior defensive quality control analyst
- Jason Slowey - Defensive quality control analyst
- Clevan "Tank" Williams – Defensive quality control analyst
- Fred Guidici – Senior special teams quality control analyst
- Matt Sargent – Offensive graduate assistant
- Sam Cohen – Defensive graduate assistant
- Ryan Deatrick – Director of football sports performance
- Anthony Lazard – Assistant director of football sports performance/applied sport science coordinator
- Tristan McLaren – Assistant director of football sports performance
- Dorian Parris – Assistant director of football sports performance
- Austin Sparks – Assistant director of football sports performance

Legend

- (C) Team captain
- (S) Suspended
- (I) Ineligible
- Injured
- Redshirt

Roster
Last update: July 1, 2025
