= 2025 SMU Mustangs football team =

American college football season

2025 SMU Mustangs football

Holiday Bowl champion

Holiday Bowl, W 24–19 vs. Arizona
- Conference: Atlantic Coast Conference
- Record: 9–4 (6–2 ACC)
- Head coach: Rhett Lashlee (4th season)
- Offensive coordinator: Casey Woods (4th season)
- Co-offensive coordinators: Rob Likens (3rd season); Garin Justice (2nd season)
- Offensive scheme: Bear raid
- Defensive coordinator: Scott Symons (4th season)
- Co-defensive coordinators: Maurice Crum Jr. (2nd season); Rickey Hunley Jr. (2nd season)
- Base defense: 4–2–5
- Home stadium: Gerald J. Ford Stadium

Uniform
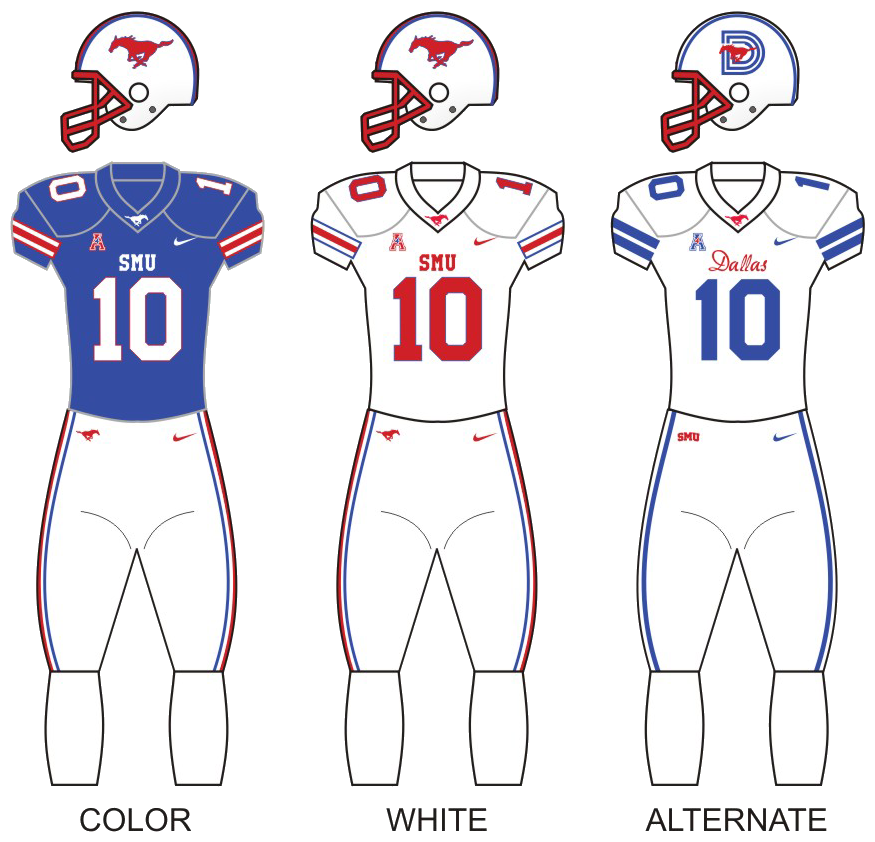

2025 Atlantic Coast Conference football standings
| | Conf. | | | Overall |
| Team | W | | L | W | | L |
|---|---|---|---|---|---|---|
| No. 16 Virginia y | 7 | – | 1 | 11 | – | 3 |
| Duke y$ | 6 | – | 2 | 9 | – | 5 |
| No. 2 Miami (FL) ^ | 6 | – | 2 | 13 | – | 3 |
| Georgia Tech | 6 | – | 2 | 9 | – | 4 |
| SMU | 6 | – | 2 | 9 | – | 4 |
| Pittsburgh | 6 | – | 2 | 8 | – | 5 |
| Louisville | 4 | – | 4 | 9 | – | 4 |
| Wake Forest | 4 | – | 4 | 9 | – | 4 |
| NC State | 4 | – | 4 | 8 | – | 5 |
| California | 4 | – | 4 | 7 | – | 6 |
| Clemson | 4 | – | 4 | 7 | – | 6 |
| Stanford | 3 | – | 5 | 4 | – | 8 |
| Florida State | 2 | – | 6 | 5 | – | 7 |
| Virginia Tech | 2 | – | 6 | 3 | – | 9 |
| North Carolina | 2 | – | 6 | 4 | – | 8 |
| Boston College | 1 | – | 7 | 2 | – | 10 |
| Syracuse | 1 | – | 7 | 3 | – | 9 |
Championship: Duke 27, Virginia 20^{OT}
^ – College Football Playoff participant; $ – Conference champion; y – Championship game participant; As of November 8, 2026; Rankings from AP Poll

The 2025 SMU Mustangs football team represent Southern Methodist University (SMU) as a member of the Atlantic Coast Conference (ACC) during the 2025 NCAA Division I FBS football season. They were led by Rhett Lashlee in his fourth year as head coach. The Mustangs played their home games at Gerald J. Ford Stadium in University Park, Texas.

The SMU Mustangs drew an average home attendance of 33,530.

== Transfers ==
Incoming

| Name | Pos. | Height | Weight | Hometown | Previous School |
|---|---|---|---|---|---|
| Addison Nichols | OL | 6'5" | 312 lbs | Norcross, GA | Arkansas |
| Deshawn Warner | EDGE | 6'4" | 215 lbs | Goodyear, AZ | Kansas |
| Christopher Johnson | RB | 5'11" | 169 lbs | Fort Lauderdale, FL | Miami (FL) |
| Joshua Bates | OL | 6'3" | 280 lbs | Durango, CO | Oklahoma |
| Zakye Barker | LB | 5'11" | 220 lbs | Norcross, GA | East Carolina |
| Trey Wilson | DL | 6'3" | 245 lbs | Garland, TX | Baylor |
| Damarjhe Lewis | DL | 6'3" | 301 lbs | Griffin, GA | Purdue |
| Eric Taylor | DL | 6'4" | 280 lbs | Trussville, AL | Mississippi State |
| Ryan Collins | P | 6'3" | 220 lbs | Santa Clara, CA | Cal Poly |
| Zion Nelson | OT | 6'5" | 307 lbs | Sumter, SC | Miami (FL) |
| Tyler Van Dyke | QB | 6'4" | 229 lbs | Glastonbury, CT | Wisconsin |
| Jeffrey M'Ba | DL | 6'6" | 315 lbs | Independence, KS | Purdue |
| Marcellus Barnes | CB | 5'11.5" | 170 lbs | Chattanooga, TN | Syracuse |
| Morgan Tribbett | LS | 5'11" | 230 lbs | Eaton, CO | Colorado State |
| Terry Webb | DL | 6'3" | 300 lbs | Galveston, TX | Texas State |
| T.J. Harden | RB | 6'2" | 215 lbs | Los Angeles, CA | UCLA |
| Jahkai Lang | EDGE | 6'3" | 234 lbs | Troy, MO | Missouri |
| William Spencer | DL | 6'5" | 315 lbs | New Albany, IN | Louisville |
| Aakil Washington | EDGE | 6'3" | 218 lbs | Marietta, GA | South Alabama |
| Keveionta Spears | DL | 6'4" | 297 lbs | Baton Rouge, LA | Memphis |
| Yamir Knight | WR | 5'9" | 180 lbs | Smyrna, DE | James Madison |
| Dylan Goffney | WR | 6'1" | 195 lbs | Cypress, TX | Colorado State |
| James Larson | TE | 6'4" | 235 lbs | St. Charles, IL | UConn |

Outgoing

| Name | Pos. | Height | Weight | Hometown | New School |
|---|---|---|---|---|---|
| Preston Stone | QB | 6'2" | 210 lbs | Dallas, TX | Northwestern |
| Jahari Rogers | CB | 6'0" | 180 lbs | Arlington, TX | Colorado State |
| Carter Campbell | WR | 6'0" | 196 lbs | San Antonio, TX | Northern State |
| Omari Abor | DL | 6'4" | 255 lbs | Duncanville, TX | CSU Pueblo |
| Tyler Aronson | QB | 6'2" | 200 lbs | North Palm Beach, FL | Trinity (CT) |
| Jamarion Carroll | WR | 6'2" | 195 lbs | Wichita Falls, TX | Midwestern State |
| Jackson Waller | P | 6'3" | 195 lbs | Katy, TX | Arkansas State |
| LJ Johnson | RB | 5'10" | 205 lbs | Cypress, TX | California |
| Reagan Gill | OT | 6'6" | 315 lbs | Houston, TX | McNeese |
| Zach Smith | LB | 6'1" | 200 lbs | Red Oak, TX | Western Kentucky |
| Qae'shon Sapp | IOL | 6'5" | 320 lbs | Leesburg, GA | Florida Atlantic |
| Jaylan Knighton | RB | 5'9" | 195 lbs | Deerfield Beach, FL | West Virginia |
| Ashton Cozart | WR | 6'2.5" | 182 lbs | Flower Mound, TX | Kentucky |
| Mike Yoan Sandijo-Nijiki | DL | 6'2" | 302 lbs | Keller, TX | Washington State |
| Sam Eccles | P | 5'11" | 179 lbs | Austin, TX | South Dakota Mines |
| A.J. Davis | CB | 5'10" | 177 lbs | Dallas, TX | Washington State |
| Eric Taylor | DL | 6'4" | 280 lbs | Trussville, AL | Coastal Carolina |
| Keldric Luster | QB | 5'10" | 227 lbs | Frisco, TX | Texas State |
| David Abiara | EDGE | 6'4" | 284 lbs | Mansfield, TX | Texas State |
| Randy Reece | WR | 5'10" | 190 lbs | Dallas, TX | East Texas A&M |
| Will Benton IV | LS | 6'1" | 220 lbs | Atlanta, GA | Georgia Tech |

== Schedule ==
| Date | Time | Opponent | Rank | Site | TV | Result | Attendance |
|---|---|---|---|---|---|---|---|
| August 30 | 8:00 p.m. | East Texas A&M* | No. 16 | Gerald J. Ford Stadium; University Park, TX | ACCN | W 42–13 | 33,044 |
| September 6 | 11:00 a.m. | Baylor* | No. 17 | Gerald J. Ford Stadium; University Park, TX | The CW | L 45–48 ^{2OT} | 34,852 |
| September 13 | 2:30 p.m. | at Missouri State* | | Robert W. Plaster Stadium; Springfield, MO | CBSSN | W 28–10 | 15,027 |
| September 20 | 11:00 a.m. | at TCU* | | Amon G. Carter Stadium; Fort Worth, TX (rivalry) | ESPN2 | L 24–35 | 43,333 |
| October 4 | 2:30 p.m. | Syracuse | | Gerald J. Ford Stadium; University Park, TX | ACCN | W 31–18 | 34,845 |
| October 11 | 11:00 a.m. | Stanford | | Gerald J. Ford Stadium; University Park, TX | The CW | W 34–10 | 30,654 |
| October 18 | 2:30 p.m. | at Clemson | | Memorial Stadium; Clemson, SC | ACCN | W 35–24 | 78,669 |
| October 25 | 11:00 a.m. | at Wake Forest | | Allegacy Federal Credit Union Stadium; Winston-Salem, NC | The CW | L 12–13 | 28,358 |
| November 1 | 11:00 a.m. | No. 10т Miami (FL)^{†} | | Gerald J. Ford Stadium; University Park, TX | ESPN | W 26–20 ^{OT} | 35,074 |
| November 8 | 11:00 a.m. | at Boston College | | Alumni Stadium; Chestnut Hill, MA | ACCN | W 45–13 | 38,345 |
| November 22 | 11:00 a.m. | Louisville | | Gerald J. Ford Stadium; University Park, TX | ESPN2 | W 38–6 | 32,713 |
| November 29 | 7:00 p.m. | at California | No. 21 | California Memorial Stadium; Berkeley, CA | ESPN2 | L 35–38 | 28,956 |
| January 2, 2026 | 7:00 p.m. | vs. No. 17 Arizona* | | Snapdragon Stadium; San Diego, CA (Holiday Bowl) | FOX | W 24–19 | 30,602 |
*Non-conference game; ^{†}Homecoming; Rankings from AP Poll (and CFP Rankings, after November 4) - Released prior to game; All times are in Central time

== Rankings ==
Ranking movements Legend: ██ Increase in ranking ██ Decrease in ranking — = Not ranked RV = Received votes
| | Week | | | | | | | | | | | | | | | | |
| Poll | Pre | 1 | 2 | 3 | 4 | 5 | 6 | 7 | 8 | 9 | 10 | 11 | 12 | 13 | 14 | 15 | Final |
|---|---|---|---|---|---|---|---|---|---|---|---|---|---|---|---|---|---|
| AP | 16 | 17 | RV | RV | — | — | — | — | — | — | RV | RV | RV | 25 | RV | RV | RV |
| Coaches | 16 | 16 | RV | RV | — | — | RV | — | RV | — | RV | RV | RV | 25 | RV | RV | RV |
| CFP | Not released | | | | | | | | | | — | — | — | 21 | — | — | Not released |

SMU was ranked in preseason polling for the first time since 1985.

== Personnel ==
2025 SMU Mustangs football team roster
Players
Coaches
Offense

| Pos. | # | Name | Class |
|---|---|---|---|
| RB | 0 | Derrick McFall | Fr |
| QB | 1 | Ty Hawkins | Fr |
| WR | 2 | Jordan Hudson | Sr |
| WR | 3 | Romello Brinson | Sr |
| WR | 4 | Link Rhodes | Jr |
| TE | 5 | Adam Moore | So |
| RB | 6 | Chris Johnson Jr. | So |
| QB | 7 | Kevin Jennings (C) | Jr |
| WR | 8 | Yamir Knight | Jr |
| WR | 9 | Jalen Cooper | Fr |
| WR | 11 | Carterrious Brown | Fr |
| WR | 13 | Daylon Singleton | Fr |
| QB | 14 | Charlie Fiser | Jr |
| WR | 15 | Jaxson Lavender | So |
| QB | 16 | Tyler Van Dyke | GS |
| WR | 18 | Dylan Goffney | Sr |
| RB | 21 | Dramekco Green | Fr |
| RB | 25 | William Fierro | So |
| RB | 26 | Zane Minors | Sr |
| RB | 27 | T.J. Harden | Sr |
| RB | 29 | Zach Hernandez | Fr |
| WR | 33 | Meyer Pereira | So |
| WR | 34 | Lance Beeghley | Fr |
| WR | 35 | Henry Stickler | So |
| WR | 36 | Cooper Reed | So |
| WR | 39 | Keaton Cheves | Jr |
| TE | 42 | Will Locke | Fr |
| TE | 44 | Stone Eby | Sr |
| WR | 45 | Isaiah Robertson | Fr |
| TE | 46 | Sean Kane | So |
| OL | 50 | Graham Uter | Fr |
| OL | 54 | Savion Byrd | Sr |
| OL | 57 | Henry Douglass | So |
| OL | 58 | Abel Hoopii | Fr |
| OL | 59 | P. J. Williams | Jr |
| OL | 60 | Zion Nelson | GS |
| OL | 63 | Addison Nichols | Jr |
| OL | 64 | Joshua Bates | So |
| OL | 65 | Jack Laphen | Jr |
| OL | 66 | Hunter Ryan | Jr |
| OL | 68 | King Large | Fr |
| OL | 69 | Nate Anderson | Sr |
| OL | 70 | Paxton Briggle | So |
| OL | 71 | Logan Parr | GS |
| OL | 74 | Andrew Chamblee | Jr |
| OL | 75 | Dramodd Odoms | Fr |
| OL | 76 | Drew Hill | Fr |
| OL | 77 | Alex Woods | So |
| OL | 78 | Paris Patterson Jr. | So |
| OL | 79 | Sione Ma'u | So |
| TE | 82 | R. J. Maryland | Sr |
| WR | 83 | Case Holleron | So |
| TE | 84 | Tripp Riordan | So |
| TE | 85 | James Larson | Fr |
| TE | 86 | Devon Martin | Jr |
| TE | 88 | Matthew Hibner | GS |
| TE | 89 | Miles Uter | Fr |

Defense

| Pos. | # | Name | Class |
|---|---|---|---|
| CB | 0 | William Nettles | Fr |
| DE | 1 | Isaiah Smith | Sr |
| DB | 2 | Zadian Gentry | Fr |
| S | 3 | Ahmaad Moses | Sr |
| DT | 4 | Terry Webb | Sr |
| DE | 5 | DJ Warner | So |
| DT | 6 | Jeffrey M'Ba | GS |
| CB | 7 | Deuce Harmon | Sr |
| CB | 8 | Marcellus Barnes Jr. | Fr |
| DE | 9 | Cameron Robertson | Sr |
| S | 10 | Tyren Polley | Fr |
| S | 11 | Jaden Milliner-Jones | Jr |
| S | 12 | Isaiah Nwokobia | Sr |
| CB | 13 | Jaelyn Davis-Robinson | Jr |
| CB | 15 | La'Modrick Spencer | Jr |
| LB | 16 | Aakil Washington | Sr |
| S | 18 | Ka'Davion Dotson-Walker | Fr |
| LB | 20 | Justin Medlock | Sr |
| CB | 21 | Kyron Chambers | Jr |
| S | 22 | Sael Reyes | Fr |
| LB | 24 | Mark Iheanachor | Fr |
| CB | 25 | Javion Holiday | Fr |
| S | 26 | Jaylen Moses | So |
| S | 27 | Abdul Muhammad | So |
| LB | 28 | Brandon Booker | So |
| LB | 29 | Brandon Miyazono | Jr |
| LB | 30 | Kyle Ferm | So |
| S | 31 | Elijah Pratt | Fr |
| DE | 32 | Billy Walton III | So |
| LB | 33 | Zakye Barker | Jr |
| DT | 34 | Damarjhe Lewis | Sr |
| CB | 35 | Dante Wesley II | Fr |
| DE | 36 | Braeden Flowers | So |
| S | 38 | Jake Ballard | So |
| DT | 40 | Keveion'ta Spears | Sr |
| LB | 42 | Ryan Earle | Fr |
| CB | 44 | Michael De Hoyos | Jr |
| LB | 46 | Xavier Wright | So |
| S | 47 | Alex Ditsch | So |
| DE | 51 | Javier Brito | Fr |
| DE | 52 | Jahkai Lang | So |
| LB | 54 | Alexander Kilgore | Jr |
| DT | 55 | Woo Spencer | So |
| DT | 56 | Tyron Winslow | Fr |
| DE | 58 | Trey Wilson | Jr |
| DE | 90 | Jalen Shivers | Fr |
| DT | 91 | Blake Burris | GS |
| DT | 93 | Kevin Allen | So |
| DT | 94 | Jonathan Jefferson | GS |
| DE | 96 | Christian de Moor | Fr |
| DT | | Vince Martin | Fr |

Special teams

| Pos. | # | Name | Class |
|---|---|---|---|
| LS | 40 | Cameron McCulloch | So |
| K | 41 | Collin Rogers | Sr |
| P | 43 | Wade McSparron | Fr |
| LS | 48 | Morgan Tribbett | So |
| LS | 49 | Nolan Akins | Fr |
| LS | 56 | Brock O'Quinn | So |
| P | 93 | Ryan Collins | Sr |
| K | 95 | Sam Keltner | Fr |

Head coach

- Rhett Lashlee

Coordinators/assistant coaches

- Scott Symons
  Defensive coordinator/Safeties
- Casey Woods
  Offensive coordinator/Tight ends
- Kyle Cooper
  Special teams coordinator/Running backs
- Rob Likens
  Associate head coach/Co-offensive coordinator/Wide receivers
- Rickey Hunley Jr.
  Co-defensive coordinator/Cornerbacks
- Garin Justice
  Co-offensive coordinator/Offensive line
- Calvin Thibodeaux
  Defensive line
- Maurice Crum Jr.
  Co-defensive coordinator/Linebackers
- D'Eriq King
  Quarterbacks
- Sam Dunnam
  Edges

Legend

- (C) Team captain
- (S) Suspended
- (I) Ineligible
- Injured
- Redshirt

Roster
Last update: July 28, 2025

== Game summaries ==
=== East Texas A&M (FCS) ===
East Texas A&M Lions (FCS) (0–0) at No. 16 SMU Mustangs (0–0) – Game summary

| Quarter | 1 | 2 | 3 | 4 | Total |
|---|---|---|---|---|---|
| Lions (FCS) | 0 | 3 | 0 | 10 | 13 |
| No. 16 Mustangs | 14 | 7 | 7 | 14 | 42 |

at Gerald J. Ford Stadium • University Park, Texas

- Date: August 30
- Game time: 8:00 p.m. CDT
- Game weather: Sunny, 72 °F (22 °C)
- Game attendance: 33,044
- Referee: Jon Noli
- TV announcers (ACCN): Wes Durham, Steve Addazio, and Dana Boyle
- Box score, Recap

Game information

First quarter

- SMU – Romello Brinson 63-yard pass from Kevin Jennings (Collin Rogers kick), 14:07. Mustangs 7–0. Drive: 3 plays, 75 yards, 0:53.
- SMU – Alexander Kilgore 10-yard interception return (Collin Rogers kick), 5:32. Mustangs 14–0.

Second quarter

- SMU – Chris Johnson Jr. 22-yard run (Collin Rogers kick), 14:12. Mustangs 21–0. Drive: 6 plays, 80 yards, 2:01.
- ETAM – Ozlo Rigby 29-yard field goal, 5:20. Mustangs 21–3. Drive: 8 plays, 68 yards, 3:39.

Third quarter

- SMU – Ahmaad Moses 95-yard interception return (Collin Rogers kick), 9:32. Mustangs 28–3.

Fourth quarter

- SMU – Kevin Jennings 7-yard run (Collin Rogers kick), 14:12. Mustangs 35–3. Drive: 13 plays, 81 yards, 4:21.
- SMU – Jalen Cooper 38-yard pass from Kevin Jennings (Collin Rogers kick), 9:34. Mustangs 42–3. Drive: 3 plays, 47 yards, 0:44.
- ETAM – Eric Rodriguez 1-yard run (Ozlo Rigby kick), 2:55. Mustangs 42–10. Drive: 13 plays, 80 yards, 6:34.
- ETAM – Ozlo Rigby 32-yard field goal, 0:00. Mustangs 42–13. Drive: 8 plays, 31 yards, 1:54.

| Statistics | ETAM | SMU |
|---|---|---|
| First downs | 17 | 25 |
| Total yards | 78–351 | 63–400 |
| Rushing yards | 35–107 | 33–140 |
| Passing yards | 244 | 260 |
| Passing: comp–att–int | 20–43–2 | 22–30–1 |
| Turnovers | 3 | 3 |
| Time of possession | 38:59 | 21:01 |

| Team | Category | Player | Statistics |
|---|---|---|---|
| East Texas A&M | Passing | Eric Rodriguez | 14/30, 191 yards, INT |
| East Texas A&M | Rushing | JaiSean McMillian | 4 carries, 31 yards |
| East Texas A&M | Receiving | Devin Matthews | 4 receptions, 87 yards |
| SMU | Passing | Kevin Jennings | 22/30, 260 yards, 2 TD, INT |
| SMU | Rushing | Chris Johnson Jr. | 6 carries, 44 yards, TD |
| SMU | Receiving | Romello Brinson | 7 receptions, 121 yards, TD |

SMU handily defeated East Texas A&M 42–13. SMU's defense returned two interceptions for touchdowns. They allowed the Lions to enter the red zone six times during the game, but only half of those trips resulted in scores. Quarterback Kevin Jennings threw for a 63-yard touchdown pass on the first drive of the game and scored two others, but he also threw an interception and lost the ball on a fumble. The team also incurred nearly 100 yards of penalties during the game. Two starters for the team, linebacker Alex Kilgore and wide receiver Jordan Hudson, suffered injuries early in the game.

=== Baylor ===
Baylor Bears (0–1) at No. 17 SMU Mustangs (1–0) – Game summary

| Quarter | 1 | 2 | 3 | 4 | OT | 2OT | Total |
|---|---|---|---|---|---|---|---|
| Bears | 0 | 21 | 3 | 14 | 7 | 3 | 48 |
| No. 17 Mustangs | 10 | 14 | 0 | 14 | 7 | 0 | 45 |

at Gerald J. Ford Stadium • University Park, Texas

- Date: September 6
- Game time: 11:00 a.m. CDT
- Game weather: Cloudy • Temperature: 67 °F (19 °C) • Wind: N 2 mph
- Game attendance: 34,852
- Referee: Cravonne Barrett
- TV announcers (The CW): Rick Allen, Will Blackmon, and Wes Bryant

Game information

First quarter

- (14:48) SMU – Romello Brinson 75-yard pass from Kevin Jennings, Collin Rogers kick (Drive: 1 play, 75 yards, 0:12; SMU 7–0)
- (7:03) SMU – Collin Rogers 43-yard field goal (Drive: 8 plays, 31 yards, 2:52; SMU 10–0)

Second quarter

- (12:12) BAY – Kobe Prentice 28-yard pass from Sawyer Robertson, Connor Hawkins kick (Drive: 9 plays, 81 yards, 3:26; SMU 10–7)
- (7:21) SMU – T. J. Harden 3-yard run, Collin Rogers kick (Drive: 11 plays, 65 yards, 4:51; SMU 17–7)
- (5:07) BAY – Josh Cameron 33-yard pass from Sawyer Robertson, Connor Hawkins kick (Drive: 7 plays, 75 yards, 2:12; SMU 17–14)
- (4:49) SMU – Jalen Cooper 75-yard pass from Kevin Jennings, Collin Rogers kick (Drive: 1 play, 75 yards, 0:12; SMU 24–14)
- (0:37) BAY – Bryson Washington 7-yard run, Connor Hawkins kick (Drive: 11 plays, 79 yards, 4:07; SMU 24–21)

Third quarter

- (5:04) BAY – Connor Hawkins 26-yard field goal (Drive: 12 plays, 57 yards, 5:32; Tied 24–24)

Fourth quarter

- (14:24) SMU – T. J. Harden 40-yard run, Collin Rogers kick (Drive: 5 plays, 75 yards, 2:11; SMU 31–24)
- (8:38) SMU – T. J. Harden 5-yard run, Collin Rogers kick (Drive: 8 plays, 35 yards, 4:59; SMU 38–24)
- (5:23) BAY – Josh Cameron 48-yard pass from Sawyer Robertson, Connor Hawkins kick (Drive: 8 plays, 72 yards, 3:09; SMU 38–31)
- (0:34) BAY – Kobe Prentice 21-yard pass from Sawyer Robertson, Connor Hawkins kick (Drive: 10 plays, 82 yards, 1:49; Tied 38–38)

Overtime

- BAY – Bryson Washington 2-yard run, Connor Hawkins kick (Drive: 3 plays, 25 yards, 0:00; Baylor 45–38)
- SMU – Romello Brinson 25-yard pass from Kevin Jennings, Collin Rogers kick (Drive: 1 play, 25 yards, 0:00; Tied 45–45)

Double overtime

- BAY – Connor Hawkins 27-yard field goal (Drive: 7 plays, 16 yards, 0:00; Baylor 48–45)

| Statistics | BAY | SMU |
|---|---|---|
| First downs | 32 | 23 |
| Plays–yards | 94–601 | 66–458 |
| Rushes–yards | 44–161 | 44–163 |
| Passing yards | 440 | 295 |
| Passing: comp–att–int | 34–50–0 | 16–22–1 |
| Turnovers | 2 | 1 |
| Time of possession | 32:36 | 27:24 |

| Team | Category | Player | Statistics |
|---|---|---|---|
| Baylor | Passing | Sawyer Robertson | 34/50, 440 yards, 4 TD |
| Baylor | Rushing | Bryson Washington | 31 carries, 115 yards, 2 TD |
| Baylor | Receiving | Josh Cameron | 9 receptions, 151 yards, 2 TD |
| SMU | Passing | Kevin Jennings | 16/22, 295 yards, 3 TD, INT |
| SMU | Rushing | T. J. Harden | 19 carries, 115 yards, 3 TD |
| SMU | Receiving | Romello Brinson | 4 receptions, 126 yards, 2 TD |

Baylor, a former rival from both teams' time in the now-defunct Southwest Conference, narrowly upset SMU 48–45 in double overtime. SMU has not defeated Baylor since 1986, losing the last 14 matchups between the teams.

Both teams had impressive showings on offense. Quarterback Kevin Jennings threw for three touchdowns during the game, including two 75-yard touchdown passes in the first half, but Baylor made up this deficit, tying the game in the third quarter. Running back TJ Harden then scored two touchdowns to put the team up by 14 points with only 5 minutes to go, but the team's defense allowed Baylor to tie the game very quickly. Kicker Collin Rogers then missed a walk-off field goal after having missed another earlier, sending the game to overtime.

Both teams scored quickly in the first overtime period, sending the game to a second overtime. SMU's offense failed to score a touchdown, and Rogers missed another field goal leading into Baylor's possession, which allowed them to win the game with a walk-off field goal of their own.

The loss to Baylor put a significant damper on the team's hopes of making the College Football Playoff for a second year in a row, but some have compared it to their loss to BYU early in the previous season. Following the game, SMU reopened its kicking competition in response to Rogers' missed field goals.

=== at Missouri State ===
SMU Mustangs (1–1) at Missouri State Bears (1–1) – Game summary

| Quarter | 1 | 2 | 3 | 4 | Total |
|---|---|---|---|---|---|
| Mustangs | 0 | 14 | 7 | 7 | 28 |
| Bears | 10 | 0 | 0 | 0 | 10 |

at Robert W. Plaster Stadium • Springfield, Missouri

- Date: September 13
- Game time: 2:30 p.m. CDT
- Game weather: Sunny • Temperature: 91 °F (33 °C) • Wind: W 7 mph
- Game attendance: 15,027
- Referee: Nolan Dumas
- TV announcers (CBSSN): Jack Gordon (play-by-play), Taylor McHargue (analyst) and Brandon Marcello (sideline)

Game information

First quarter

- MOST – Yousef Obeid 38-yard field goal, 10:21. Bears 3–0. Drive: 7 plays, 38 yards, 3:25.
- MOST – Dash Luke 9-yard pass from Jacob Clark (Yousef Obeid kick), 2:59. Bears 10–0. Drive: 6 plays, 74 yards, 3:58.

Second quarter

- SMU – Dramecko Green 6-yard run (Sam Keltner kick), 3:42. Bears 10–7. Drive: 12 plays, 73 yards, 3:54.
- SMU – T. J. Harden 5-yard run (Sam Keltner kick), 0:33. Mustangs 14–10. Drive: 8 plays, 80 yards, 1:19.

Third quarter

- SMU – T. J. Harden 37-yard run (Sam Keltner kick), 3:03. Mustangs 21–10. Drive: 3 plays, 46 yards, 1:18.

Fourth quarter

- SMU – RJ Maryland 7-yard pass from Kevin Jennings (Sam Keltner kick), 12:58. Mustangs 28–10. Drive: 5 plays, 55 yards, 2:02.

| Statistics | SMU | MOST |
|---|---|---|
| First downs | 24 | 19 |
| Plays–yards | 70–448 | 65–328 |
| Rushes–yards | 34–167 | 27–53 |
| Passing yards | 281 | 275 |
| Passing: comp–att–int | 24–36–1 | 23–38–3 |
| Turnovers | 2 | 3 |
| Time of possession | 28:30 | 31:30 |

| Team | Category | Player | Statistics |
|---|---|---|---|
| SMU | Passing | Kevin Jennings | 24/36, 281 yards, TD, INT |
| SMU | Rushing | T. J. Harden | 15 rushes, 96 yards, 2 TD |
| SMU | Receiving | Jalen Cooper | 5 receptions, 68 yards |
| Missouri State | Passing | Jacob Clark | 23/37, 275 yards, TD, 3 INT |
| Missouri State | Rushing | Shomari Lawrence | 13 rushes, 44 yards |
| Missouri State | Receiving | Dash Luke | 5 receptions, 80 yards, TD |

=== at TCU (rivalry) ===
SMU Mustangs (2–1) at TCU Horned Frogs (2–0) – Game summary

| Quarter | 1 | 2 | 3 | 4 | Total |
|---|---|---|---|---|---|
| Mustangs | 3 | 7 | 7 | 7 | 24 |
| Horned Frogs | 7 | 7 | 7 | 14 | 35 |

at Amon G. Carter Stadium • Fort Worth, Texas

- Date: September 20
- Game time: 11:00 a.m. CDT
- Game weather: Sunny, 86 degrees
- Game attendance: 43,333
- Referee: Jerry Magallanes
- TV announcers (ESPN2): Roy Philpott (play-by-play), Sam Acho (analyst) and Taylor Davis (sideline)

Game information

First quarter

- TCU – Eric McAlister 27-yard pass from Josh Hoover (Nate McCashland kick), 8:56. Horned Frogs 7–0. Drive: 9 plays, 67 yards, 4:23.
- SMU – Sam Keltner 28-yard field goal, 3:32. Horned Frogs 7–3. Drive: 12 plays, 68 yards, 5:18.

Second quarter

- TCU – Jeremy Payne 10-yard pass from Josh Hoover (Nate McCashland kick), 14:26. Horned Frogs 14–3. Drive: 13 plays, 75 yards, 4:06.
- SMU – Matthew Hibner 9-yard pass from Kevin Jennings (Sam Keltner kick), 7:21. Horned Frogs 14–10. Drive: 12 plays, 75 yards, 6:59.

Third quarter

- TCU – Joseph Manjack IV 4-yard pass from Josh Hoover (Nate McCashland kick), 10:50. Horned Frogs 21–10. Drive: 4 plays, 53 yards, 1:31.
- SMU – Yamir Knight 7-yard pass from Kevin Jennings (Sam Keltner kick), 5:54. Horned Frogs 21–17. Drive: 10 plays, 75 yards, 4:56.

Fourth quarter

- SMU – Jordan Hudson 34-yard pass from Kevin Jennings (Sam Keltner kick), 10:30. Mustangs 24–21. Drive: 4 plays, 65 yards, 1:49.
- TCU – Eric McAlister 70-yard pass from Josh Hoover (Nate McCashland kick), 9:18. Horned Frogs 28–24. Drive: 3 plays, 75 yards, 1:12.
- TCU – Eric McAlister 44-yard pass from Josh Hoover (Nate McCashland kick), 6:03. Horned Frogs 35–24. Drive: 6 plays, 75 yards, 2:45.

| Statistics | SMU | TCU |
|---|---|---|
| First downs | 19 | 24 |
| Plays–yards | 65–384 | 77–517 |
| Rushes–yards | 27–94 | 37–138 |
| Passing yards | 290 | 379 |
| Passing: comp–att–int | 24–38–2 | 22–40–1 |
| Turnovers | 2 | 1 |
| Time of possession | 28:54 | 31:06 |

| Team | Category | Player | Statistics |
|---|---|---|---|
| SMU | Passing | Kevin Jennings | 24/38, 290 yards, 3 TD, 2 INT |
| SMU | Rushing | T. J. Harden | 15 carries, 56 yards |
| SMU | Receiving | Yamir Knight | 5 receptions, 69 yards, TD |
| TCU | Passing | Josh Hoover | 22/40, 379 yards, 5 TD, INT |
| TCU | Rushing | Trent Battle | 7 carries, 60 yards |
| TCU | Receiving | Eric McAlister | 8 receptions, 254 yards, 3 TD |

This game was the final meeting of the "Battle for the Iron Skillet" rivalry between SMU and TCU for the foreseeable future. At the start of the 2023 season, TCU announced it was not renewing its contract with SMU to play the game after more than 100 years of near-continuous play, preferring to schedule more non-conference games against teams in power conferences. (Note: SMU was still a member of the American Athletic Conference at the time of the announcement)

=== Syracuse ===
Syracuse Orange (3–2) at SMU Mustangs (2–2) – Game summary

| Quarter | 1 | 2 | 3 | 4 | Total |
|---|---|---|---|---|---|
| Orange | 0 | 3 | 0 | 15 | 18 |
| Mustangs | 3 | 21 | 0 | 7 | 31 |

at Gerald J. Ford Stadium • University Park, Texas

- Date: October 4
- Game time: 2:30 p.m. CDT
- Game weather: Sunny, 89 degrees
- Game attendance: 34,845
- Referee: Mike Roche
- TV announcers (ACCN): Wes Durham (play-by-play), Steve Addazio (analyst) and Dana Boyle (sideline)

Game information

First quarter

- SMU – Sam Keltner 26-yard field goal, 2:34. Mustangs 3–0. Drive: 4 plays, 4 yards, 1:12.

Second quarter

- SMU – Yamir Knight 15-yard pass from Kevin Jennings (Sam Keltner kick), 12:58. Mustangs 10–0. Drive: 7 plays, 78 yards, 2:43.
- SMU – RJ Maryland 16-yard pass from Kevin Jennings (Sam Keltner kick), 8:02. Mustangs 17–0. Drive: 3 plays, 40 yards, 1:20.
- SMU – Derrick McFall 14-yard pass from Kevin Jennings (Sam Keltner kick), 2:18. Mustangs 24–0. Drive: 6 plays, 90 yards, 2:18.
- SYR – Tripp Woody 38-yard field goal, 0:00. Mustangs 24–3. Drive: 11 plays, 62 yards, 2:13.

Third quarter

- No scoring plays.

Fourth quarter

- SMU – Jordan Hudson 9-yard pass from Kevin Jennings (Sam Keltner kick), 12:37. Mustangs 31–3. Drive: 9 plays, 77 yards, 3:30.
- SYR – Rickie Collins 6-yard run (Tripp Woody kick), 9:59. Mustangs 31–10. Drive: 8 plays, 75 yards, 2:38.
- SYR – David Omopariola safety, 8:55. Mustangs 31–12.
- SYR – Johntay Cook 11-yard pass from Rickie Collins (run failed), 5:20. Mustangs 31–18. Drive: 8 plays, 62 yards, 3:29.

| Statistics | SYR | SMU |
|---|---|---|
| First downs | 18 | 21 |
| Plays–yards | 78–389 | 64–370 |
| Rushes–yards | 33–110 | 28–76 |
| Passing yards | 279 | 294 |
| Passing: comp–att–int | 22–45–3 | 30–36–1 |
| Turnovers | 3 | 1 |
| Time of possession | 31:25 | 28:35 |

| Team | Category | Player | Statistics |
|---|---|---|---|
| Syracuse | Passing | Rickie Collins | 22/45, 279 yards, TD, 3 INT |
| Syracuse | Rushing | Rickie Collins | 10 carries, 57 yards, TD |
| Syracuse | Receiving | Johntay Cook II | 7 receptions, 82 yards, TD |
| SMU | Passing | Kevin Jennings | 29/35, 285 yards, 4 TD, INT |
| SMU | Rushing | T. J. Harden | 16 carries, 67 yards |
| SMU | Receiving | Romello Brinson | 7 receptions, 71 yards |

=== Stanford ===
Stanford Cardinal (2–3) at SMU Mustangs (3–2) – Game summary

| Quarter | 1 | 2 | 3 | 4 | Total |
|---|---|---|---|---|---|
| Cardinal | 0 | 7 | 3 | 0 | 10 |
| Mustangs | 7 | 10 | 7 | 10 | 34 |

at Gerald J. Ford Stadium • University Park, Texas

- Date: October 11
- Game time: 11:00 a.m. CDT
- Game weather: Sunny, 78 degrees
- Game attendance: 30,654
- Referee: Nate Black
- TV announcers (The CW): Thom Brennaman (play-by-play), Will Blackmon (analyst) and Wes Bryant (sideline)

Game information

First quarter

- SMU – Derrick McFall 19-yard pass from Kevin Jennings (Sam Keltner kick), 2:39. Mustangs 7–0. Drive: 13 plays, 75 yards, 5:16.

Second quarter

- SMU – Sam Keltner 32-yard field goal, 12:30. Mustangs 10–0. Drive: 8 plays, 65 yards, 3:06.
- SMU – Chris Johnson Jr. 87-yard run (Sam Keltner kick), 0:35. Mustangs 17–0. Drive: 6 plays, 98 yards, 2:09.
- STAN – CJ Williams 14-yard pass from Ben Gulbranson (Emmet Kenney kick), 0:02. Mustangs 17–7. Drive: 4 plays, 75 yards, 0:33.

Third quarter

- SMU – Chris Johnson Jr. 42-yard pass from Kevin Jennings (Sam Keltner kick), 8:22. Mustangs 24–7. Drive: 5 plays, 82 yards, 2:07.
- STAN – Emmet Kenney 34-yard field goal, 0:34. Mustangs 24–10. Drive: 11 plays, 50 yards, 4:31.

Fourth quarter

- SMU – Justin Medlock 96-yard interception return (Sam Keltner kick), 6:05. Mustangs 31–10.
- SMU – Sam Keltner 48-yard field goal, 1:32. Mustangs 34–10. Drive: 9 plays, 45 yards, 4:03.

| Statistics | STAN | SMU |
|---|---|---|
| First downs | 23 | 17 |
| Plays–yards | 74–353 | 54–369 |
| Rushes–yards | 33–75 | 24–122 |
| Passing yards | 278 | 247 |
| Passing: comp–att–int | 22–41–1 | 22–30–0 |
| Turnovers | 2 | 0 |
| Time of possession | 36:30 | 23:30 |

| Team | Category | Player | Statistics |
|---|---|---|---|
| Stanford | Passing | Ben Gulbranson | 22/40, 278 yards, TD, INT |
| Stanford | Rushing | Cole Tabb | 9 carries, 62 yards |
| Stanford | Receiving | CJ Williams | 7 receptions, 109 yards, TD |
| SMU | Passing | Kevin Jennings | 22/30, 247 yards, 2 TD |
| SMU | Rushing | Chris Johnson Jr. | 5 carries, 96 yards, TD |
| SMU | Receiving | Jordan Hudson | 5 receptions, 87 yards |

=== at Clemson ===
SMU Mustangs (4–2) at Clemson Tigers (3–3) – Game summary

| Quarter | 1 | 2 | 3 | 4 | Total |
|---|---|---|---|---|---|
| Mustangs | 7 | 9 | 7 | 12 | 35 |
| Tigers | 0 | 7 | 10 | 7 | 24 |

at Memorial Stadium • Clemson, South Carolina

- Date: October 18
- Game time: 2:30 p.m. CDT
- Game weather: Temperature: 79 °F (26 °C) • Wind: SW @ 8 mph • Weather: Sunny
- Game attendance: 78,669
- Referee: Mike Roche
- TV announcers (ACCN): Wes Durham (play-by-play), Steve Addazio (color) and Dana Boyle (sideline)

Game information

First quarter

- (03:52) SMU – Jordan Hudson 70-yard pass from Kevin Jennings, Sam Keltner kick (Drive: 1 play, 70 yards, 0:09; SMU 7–0)

Second quarter

- (11:26) SMU – Sam Keltner 51-yard field goal (Drive: 10 plays, 33 yards, 3:38; SMU 10–0)
- (08:51) CLEM – T. J. Moore 32-yard pass from Christopher Vizzina, Nolan Hauser kick (Drive: 6 plays, 75 yards, 2:35; SMU 10–7)
- (04:29) SMU – Sam Keltner 48-yard field goal (Drive: 10 plays, 44 yards, 4:22; SMU 13–7)
- (01:09) SMU – Sam Keltner 48-yard field goal (Drive: 10 plays, 33 yards, 1:44; SMU 16–7)

Third quarter

- (08:48) CLEM – T.J. Moore 62-yard pass from Christopher Vizzina, Nolan Hauser kick (Drive: 4 plays, 74 yards, 1:23; SMU 16–14)
- (07:29) SMU – Derrick McFall 35-yard run, Sam Keltner kick (Drive: 4 plays, 75 yards, 1:19; SMU 23–14)
- (00:07) CLEM – Nolan Hauser 28-yard field goal (Drive: 17 plays, 65 yards, 7:21; SMU 23–17)

Fourth quarter

- (12:30) SMU – Matthew Hibner 22-yard pass from Kevin Jennings, Sam Keltner kick failed (Drive: 6 play, 75 yards, 2:37; SMU 29–17)
- (06:44) CLEM – Tristan Smith 23-yard pass from Christopher Vizzina, Nolan Hauser kick (Drive: 8 plays, 49 yards, 3:27; SMU 29–24)
- (01:03) SMU – Chris Johnson Jr. 6-yard run, 2-point pass failed (Drive: 13 plays, 75 yards, 5:41; SMU 35–24)

| Statistics | SMU | CLEM |
|---|---|---|
| First downs | 21 | 20 |
| Plays–yards | 71–429 | 72–352 |
| Rushes–yards | 28–139 | 30–35 |
| Passing yards | 290 | 317 |
| Passing: comp–att–int | 23–43–1 | 29–42–0 |
| Turnovers | 1 | 0 |
| Time of possession | 28:45 | 31:15 |

| Team | Category | Player | Statistics |
|---|---|---|---|
| SMU | Passing | Kevin Jennings | 23/43, 290 yards, 2 TD, INT |
| SMU | Rushing | Chris Johnson Jr. | 6 carries, 59 yards, TD |
| SMU | Receiving | Jordan Hudson | 7 receptions, 131 yards, TD |
| Clemson | Passing | Christopher Vizzina | 29/42, 317 yards, 3 TD |
| Clemson | Rushing | Adam Randall | 10 carries, 29 yards |
| Clemson | Receiving | T. J. Moore | 5 receptions, 124 yards, 2 TD |

SMU defeated Clemson 35–24 in a rematch of the 2024 ACC Championship Game. Clemson starting quarterback Cade Klubnik did not play due to an ankle injury, with backup Christopher Vizzina taking his place for his first career start.

SMU quarterback Kevin Jennings reaggravated his own ankle injury during the first drive, but he did not exit the game. SMU scored first, with Jennings making a 70-yard touchdown pass to Jordan Hudson late in the first quarter. Vizzina lost a fumble on Clemson's second possession but later threw for a touchdown in the second quarter. Kicker Sam Keltner then made three long field goals to give SMU a 16–7 lead at halftime. Both teams traded touchdowns in the third quarter, with Clemson also scoring a field goal to shrink SMU's lead to one score. Both teams traded touchdowns in the fourth quarter until SMU scored a second touchdown with one minute left to pad their lead to two scores, leading to their 35–24 victory.

Many compared the game's environment, which took place at Clemson's stadium, nicknamed "Death Valley," to the previous season's ACC Championship game as well as SMU's game against Penn State in the first round of the 2024 College Football Playoff. All three took place in hostile road environments with large crowds. SMU had been characterized as unprepared for the two 2024 games, especially their blowout loss to Penn State, they maintained much stronger composure against Clemson, winning by two scores. SMU's defensive line also performed much better than earlier in the season, forcing three three-and-outs on Clemson's first four drives and a turnover on downs in the second quarter. Kicker Sam Keltner also showed improvement, making three long field goal attempts after having only made one out of four long attempts since taking over as starter.

=== at Wake Forest ===
SMU Mustangs (5–2) at Wake Forest Demon Deacons (4–2) – Game summary

| Quarter | 1 | 2 | 3 | 4 | Total |
|---|---|---|---|---|---|
| Mustangs | 0 | 6 | 6 | 0 | 12 |
| Demon Deacons | 3 | 7 | 0 | 3 | 13 |

at Allegacy Federal Credit Union Stadium • Winston-Salem, North Carolina

- Date: October 25
- Game time: 11:00 a.m. CDT
- Game weather: Temperature: 58 °F (14 °C) • Wind: NE @ 4 mph • Weather: Sunny
- Game attendance: 28,358
- Referee: Justin Elliott
- TV announcers (The CW): Thom Brennaman (play-by-play), Will Blackmon (analyst), and Wes Bryant (sideline)

Game information

First quarter

- (4:59) WAKE – Connor Calvert 25-yard field goal (Drive: 7 plays, 12 yards, 3:12; Wake Forest 3–0)

Second quarter

- (11:53) SMU – Sam Keltner 36-yard field goal (Drive: 12 plays, 52 yards, 4:51; Tied 3–3)
- (10:09) WAKE – Eni Falayi 12-yard pass from Robby Ashford, Connor Calvert kick (Drive: 2 plays, 14 yards, 0:41; Wake Forest 10–3)
- (3:53) SMU – Sam Keltner 35-yard field goal (Drive: 8 plays, 69 yards, 2:49; Wake Forest 10–6)

Third quarter

- (2:58) SMU – Shaadie Clayton-Johnson 6-yard run, Sam Keltner PAT blocked (Drive: 6 plays, 41 yards, 2:54; SMU 12–10)

Fourth quarter

- (0:00) WAKE – Connor Calvert 50-yard field goal (Drive: 3 plays, 25 yards, 0:12; Wake Forest 13–12)

| Statistics | SMU | WAKE |
|---|---|---|
| First downs | 8 | 17 |
| Plays–yards | 67–246 | 72–301 |
| Rushes–yards | 28–75 | 35–85 |
| Passing yards | 171 | 216 |
| Passing: comp–att–int | 21–39–1 | 18–37–2 |
| Turnovers | 3 | 5 |
| Time of possession | 27:38 | 32:22 |

| Team | Category | Player | Statistics |
|---|---|---|---|
| SMU | Passing | Kevin Jennings | 21/39, 171 yards, INT |
| SMU | Rushing | Chris Johnson Jr. | 8 carries, 29 yards |
| SMU | Receiving | RJ Maryland | 2 receptions, 51 yards |
| Wake Forest | Passing | Deshawn Purdie | 14/26, 183 yards, 2 INT |
| Wake Forest | Rushing | Demond Claiborne | 23 carries, 73 yards |
| Wake Forest | Receiving | Chris Barnes | 5 receptions, 66 yards |

=== No. 10т Miami (FL) ===
No. 10т Miami Hurricanes (6–1) at SMU Mustangs (5–3) – Game summary

| Quarter | 1 | 2 | 3 | 4 | OT | Total |
|---|---|---|---|---|---|---|
| No. 10т Hurricanes | 7 | 3 | 7 | 3 | 0 | 20 |
| Mustangs | 0 | 7 | 10 | 3 | 6 | 26 |

at Gerald J. Ford Stadium • University Park, Texas

- Date: November 1
- Game time: 11:00 a.m. CDT
- Game weather: Cloudy, 59 °F (15 °C)
- Game attendance: 35,074
- Referee: Jerry Magallanes
- TV announcers (ESPN): Mark Jones (play-by-play), Roddy Jones (analyst), and Quint Kessenich (sideline)

Game information

First quarter

- MIA – Joshisa Trader 36-yard pass from Carson Beck (Carter Davis kick), 4:16. Hurricanes 7–0. Drive: 8 plays, 62 yards, 4:27.

Second quarter

- SMU – Yamir Knight 28-yard pass from Kevin Jennings (Sam Keltner kick), 9:22. Tied 7–7. Drive: 1 play, 28 yards, 0:06.
- MIA – Carter Davis 22-yard field goal, 0:07. Hurricanes 10–7. Drive: 4 plays, 5 yards, 0:42.

Third quarter

- SMU – Kevin Jennings 3-yard run (Sam Keltner kick), 12:11. Mustangs 14–10. Drive: 9 plays, 79 yards, 2:43.
- MIA – Alex Bauman 4-yard pass from Carson Beck (Carter Davis kick), 9:06. Hurricanes 17–14. Drive: 7 plays, 75 yards, 2:59.
- SMU – Sam Keltner 43-yard field goal, 0:07. Tied 17–17. Drive: 10 plays, 44 yards, 3:56.

Fourth quarter

- MIA – Carter Davis 45-yard field goal, 9:34. Hurricanes 20–17. Drive: 10 plays, 49 yards, 5:33.
- SMU – Sam Keltner 38-yard field goal, 0:25. Tied 20–20. Drive: 11 plays, 69 yards, 1:44.

Overtime

- SMU – T. J. Harden 1-yard run. Mustangs 26–20. Drive: 6 plays, 25 yards.

| Statistics | MIA | SMU |
|---|---|---|
| First downs | 23 | 20 |
| Plays–yards | 78–433 | 70–388 |
| Rushes–yards | 40–159 | 25–23 |
| Passing yards | 274 | 365 |
| Passing: comp–att–int | 26–38–2 | 29–45–0 |
| Turnovers | 2 | 1 |
| Time of possession | 37:42 | 22:18 |

| Team | Category | Player | Statistics |
|---|---|---|---|
| Miami (FL) | Passing | Carson Beck | 26/38, 274 yards, 2 TD, 2 INT |
| Miami (FL) | Rushing | Mark Fletcher Jr. | 16 carries, 84 yards |
| Miami (FL) | Receiving | Joshisa Trader | 5 receptions, 81 yards, TD |
| SMU | Passing | Kevin Jennings | 29/44, 365 yards, TD |
| SMU | Rushing | T. J. Harden | 8 carries, 27 yards, TD |
| SMU | Receiving | Jordan Hudson | 11 receptions, 136 yards |

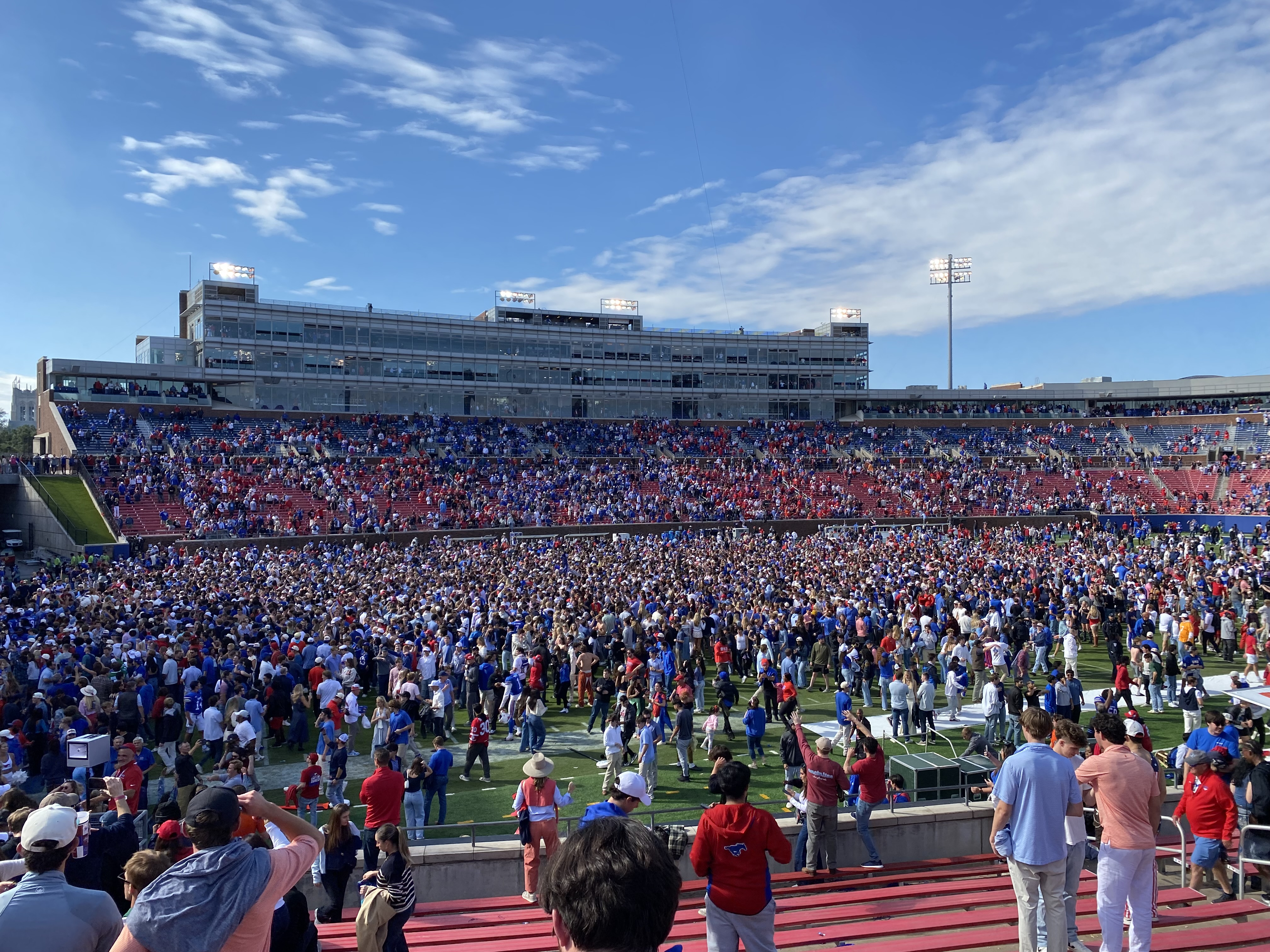
SMU fans storming the field after beating Miami in overtime.

SMU defeated Miami 26–20 in overtime in the Mustangs' first home win against an AP top 10 opponent since 1974.

Miami largely controlled the game during the first half, outgaining SMU by over 100 yards in that timespan. Despite this, they only scored 10 points during the first half. SMU's longest drive of the first half ended on a fumbled handoff from Kevin Jennings to tight end R. J. Maryland on a fourth down conversion attempt. Penalties stymied several of Miami's drives, with another ending after Joshisa Trader bobbled a pass, allowing SMU's Ahmaad Moses to intercept it. SMU tied the game 7–7 with a touchdown on the following play. Both teams then held each other to a stalemate for the rest of the first half until Miami's Malachi Toney returned a punt to within the 10-yard line. Despite this favorable field position, however, SMU's defense held Miami to only a field goal, sending the game to halftime with Miami up 10–7.

SMU opened the second half with a fumble by Kevin Jennings that was later ruled an incomplete pass. Retaining possession, Jennings led SMU's offense on a 79-yard drive down the field, scoring the touchdown himself on a 3-yard run. Miami quarterback Carson Beck then led his team on their own 75-yard touchdown drive to retake the lead 17–14. Later in the third quarter, a tackle reaggravated an ankle injury Jennings had been dealing with all season, forcing backup Ty Hawkins to take his place for two plays. Jennings then returned, with the drive ending in a game-tying field goal to start the fourth quarter. Miami retook the lead early in the fourth quarter with another field goal, taking a 20–17 lead. SMU was forced to try for another field goal on the following drive after a holding call and a failed trick play. Sam Keltner's kick missed, flying over the right upright of the goalpost, which caused controversy among fans in attendance who believed that constituted a successful score. SMU faced fourth-and-9 on their final offensive drive, but Miami head coach Mario Cristobal called for a timeout just before play began to evaluate SMU's formation. Not hearing the whistle, Miami defensive end Marquise Lightfoot ran into Jennings, drawing a 15-yard penalty that revitalized SMU's drive, allowing Sam Keltner to tie the game 20–20 with another field goal to send the game into overtime.

SMU won the coin toss and went on defense first in overtime. Miami drove very close to the goal line, but Ahmaad Moses intercepted the ball to end Miami's possession, giving SMU a substantial advantage heading into their own. After having had their runners stymied all game, SMU exclusively ran the ball during their possession, inching closer to the end zone each time until T. J. Harden scored the game-winning touchdown. SMU fans stormed the field after the 26–20 victory, tearing down one goal post and dumping it in the fountain in front of Dallas Hall.

=== at Boston College ===
SMU Mustangs (6–3) at Boston College Eagles (1–8) – Game summary

| Quarter | 1 | 2 | 3 | 4 | Total |
|---|---|---|---|---|---|
| Mustangs | 10 | 7 | 14 | 14 | 45 |
| Eagles | 0 | 6 | 0 | 7 | 13 |

at Alumni Stadium • Chestnut Hill, Massachusetts

- Date: November 8
- Game time: 11:00 a.m. CST
- Game weather: Cloudy, 56 °F (13 °C)
- Game attendance: 38,345
- Referee: Mike Roche
- TV announcers (ACCN): Chris Cotter (play-by-play), Max Browne (analyst) and Kendra Douglas (sideline)

Game information

First quarter

- SMU – Derrick McFall 1-yard run (Sam Keltner kick), 8:56. Mustangs 7–0. Drive: 7 plays, 70 yards, 2:05.
- SMU – Sam Keltner 20-yard field goal, 6:35. Mustangs 10–0. Drive: 5 plays, 30 yards, 1:07.

Second quarter

- SMU – Jordan Hudson 25-yard pass from Kevin Jennings (Sam Keltner kick), 3:01. Mustangs 17–0. Drive: 4 plays, 68 yards, 1:20.
- BC – Luca Lombardo 31-yard field goal, 1:11. Mustangs 17–3. Drive: 8 plays, 57 yards, 1:50.
- BC – Luca Lombardo 36-yard field goal, 0:04. Mustangs 17–6. Drive: 2 plays, 19 yards, 0:11.

Third quarter

- SMU – Yamir Knight 61-yard pass from Kevin Jennings (Sam Keltner kick), 10:02. Mustangs 24–6. Drive: 7 plays, 79 yards, 2:33.
- SMU – Matthew Hibner 37-yard pass from Kevin Jennings (Sam Keltner kick), 4:46. Mustangs 31–6. Drive: 7 plays, 39 yards, 4:08.

Fourth quarter

- SMU – Derrick McFall 6-yard run (Sam Keltner kick), 13:25. Mustangs 38–6. Drive: 5 plays, 67 yards, 2:32.
- BC – Jordan McDonald 5-yard pass from Dylan Lonergan (Luca Lombardo kick), 8:59. Mustangs 38–13. Drive: 13 plays, 73 yards, 4:22.
- SMU – Derrick McFall 48-yard run (Stone Eby kick), 6:38. Mustangs 45–13. Drive: 4 plays, 75 yards, 2:21.

| Statistics | SMU | BC |
|---|---|---|
| First downs | 22 | 25 |
| Plays–yards | 66–574 | 85–390 |
| Rushes–yards | 31-222 | 40–106 |
| Passing yards | 352 | 284 |
| Passing: comp–att–int | 18–26–0 | 30–45–3 |
| Turnovers | 1 | 4 |
| Time of possession | 27:02 | 32:58 |

| Team | Category | Player | Statistics |
|---|---|---|---|
| SMU | Passing | Kevin Jennings | 16/32, 326 yards, 3 TD, INT |
| SMU | Rushing | T. J. Harden | 16 carries, 130 yards |
| SMU | Receiving | Yamir Knight | 7 receptions, 162 yards, TD |
| Boston College | Passing | Dylan Lonergan | 25/37, 232 yards, TD, INT |
| Boston College | Rushing | Turbo Richard | 15 carries, 49 yards |
| Boston College | Receiving | Lewis Bond | 9 receptions, 74 yards |

SMU routed Boston College 45–13. SMU's defense played its best game of the season yet, not allowing a touchdown until the fourth quarter, forcing four takeaways and three turnovers on downs. SMU's defense already led the FBS in turnovers forced prior to the game. Safety Ahmaad Moses, already leading the FBS with five interceptions, recovered two fumbles during the game. By the fourth quarter, SMU had subbed out most of its starters, including kicker Sam Keltner, the only kicker on the team's roster, as Collin Rogers left the team after losing his starting position. Tight end Stone Eby stepped in as backup kicker, kicking the final extra point of the game barefoot.

=== Louisville ===
Louisville Cardinals (7–3) at SMU Mustangs (7–3) – Game summary

| Quarter | 1 | 2 | 3 | 4 | Total |
|---|---|---|---|---|---|
| Cardinals | 3 | 3 | 0 | 0 | 6 |
| Mustangs | 7 | 14 | 3 | 14 | 38 |

at Gerald J. Ford Stadium • University Park, Texas

- Date: November 22
- Game time: 11:00 a.m. CST
- Game weather: Sunny • Temperature: 61 °F (16 °C) • Wind: NW at 5 miles per hour (8.0 km/h)
- Game attendance: 32,713
- Referee: Jerry Magallanes
- TV announcers (ESPN2): Roy Philpott (play-by-play), Sam Acho (analyst) and Taylor Davis (sideline)

Game information

First quarter

- SMU – Kevin Jennings 2-yard run (Sam Keltner kick), 10:40. Mustangs 7–0. Drive: 9 plays, 75 yards, 4:20.
- LOU – Cooper Ranvier 36-yard field goal, 4:15. Mustangs 7–3. Drive: 12 plays, 57 yards, 6:25.

Second quarter

- SMU – Jordan Hudson 7-yard pass from Kevin Jennings (Sam Keltner kick), 8:53. Mustangs 14–3. Drive: 10 plays, 59 yards, 5:19.
- SMU – T. J. Harden 5-yard pass from Kevin Jennings (Sam Keltner kick), 3:25. Mustangs 21–3. Drive: 7 plays, 70 yards, 3:29.
- LOU – Cooper Ranvier 29-yard field goal, 1:44. Mustangs 21–6. Drive: 6 plays, 63 yards, 1:41.

Third quarter

- SMU – Sam Keltner 49-yard field goal, 0:48. Mustangs 24–6. Drive: 12 plays, 60 yards, 4:52.

Fourth quarter

- SMU – Yamir Knight 6-yard pass from Kevin Jennings (Sam Keltner kick), 9:38. Mustangs 31–6. Drive: 9 plays, 68 yards, 5:13.
- SMU – Shaadie Clayton-Johnson 50-yard run (Stone Eby kick), 6:03. Mustangs 38–6. Drive: 4 plays, 65 yards, 2:08.

| Statistics | LOU | SMU |
|---|---|---|
| First downs | 12 | 28 |
| Plays–yards | 49–228 | 66–485 |
| Rushes–yards | 29–128 | 36–178 |
| Passing yards | 100 | 307 |
| Passing: comp–att–int | 14–20–1 | 30–38–0 |
| Turnovers | 1 | 0 |
| Time of possession | 24:04 | 35:56 |

| Team | Category | Player | Statistics |
|---|---|---|---|
| Louisville | Passing | Deuce Adams | 12/17, 94 yards |
| Louisville | Rushing | Shaun Boykins | 8 carries, 52 yards |
| Louisville | Receiving | Chris Bell | 5 receptions, 46 yards |
| SMU | Passing | Kevin Jennings | 29/37, 303 yards, 3 TD |
| SMU | Rushing | T. J. Harden | 18 carries, 90 yards |
| SMU | Receiving | Jordan Hudson | 8 receptions, 96 yards, TD |

Kevin Jennings throws a pass to wide receiver Yamir Knight, who catches it in the back corner of the endzone for a touchdown. The SMU Mustang Band then plays the school's fight song "Peruna." Officials later reviewed the play and confirmed that Knight caught the pass in-bounds.

SMU routed Louisville 38–6, preventing them from scoring a single touchdown. Kevin Jennings threw three touchdowns and scored a fourth one rushing while SMU's defense held Louisville to two field goals in the first half, shutting them out in the second half. Starting Louisville quarterback Miller Moss did not play due to an injury sustained earlier in the week, and they were missing two starting running backs, with a starting receiver going out due to injury during the third quarter. Pittsburgh's victory over Georgia Tech later that day allowed SMU to regain control of their path to the ACC Championship game, with a victory over California as all they need to qualify.

=== at California ===
No. 21 SMU Mustangs (8–3) at California Golden Bears (6–5) – Game summary

| Quarter | 1 | 2 | 3 | 4 | Total |
|---|---|---|---|---|---|
| No. 21 Mustangs | 7 | 0 | 7 | 21 | 35 |
| Golden Bears | 3 | 14 | 7 | 14 | 38 |

at California Memorial Stadium • Berkeley, California

- Date: November 29
- Game time: 7:00 p.m. CST / 5:00 p.m. PST
- Game weather: Temperature: 50 °F (10 °C) • Wind: NE at 9 miles per hour (14 km/h) • Weather: Clear
- Game attendance: 28,956
- Referee: Tim Hedgepeth
- TV announcers (ESPN2): Lowell Galindo (play-by-play), Aaron Murray (analyst), and Lauren Sisler (sideline)

Game information

First quarter

- (3:23) CAL – Chase Meyer 40-yard field goal (Drive: 15 plays, 60 yards, 6:17; California 3–0)
- (1:37) SMU – Chris Johnson Jr. 54-yard run, Sam Keltner kick (Drive: 4 plays, 80 yards, 1:40 SMU 7–3)

Second quarter

- (13:33) CAL – Jaiven Plummer 35-yard pass from Jaron-Keawe Sagapolutele, Chase Meyer kick (Drive: 7 plays, 82 yards, 2:58; California 10–7)
- (10:29) CAL – Jacob De Jesus 7-yard pass from Jaron-Keawe Sagapolutele, Chase Meyer kick (Drive: 5 plays, 17 yards, 2:43; California 17–7)

Third quarter

- (8:25) CAL – Cole Boscia 15-yard pass from Jaron-Keawe Sagapolutele, Chase Meyer kick (Drive: 11 plays, 75 yards, 5:04; California 24–7)
- (4:52) SMU – Matthew Hibner 6-yard pass from Kevin Jennings, Sam Keltner kick (Drive: 9 plays, 75 yards, 3:33; California 24–14)

Fourth quarter

- (14:54) CAL – Quaron Adams 32-yard pass from Jaron-Keawe Sagapolutele, Chase Meyer kick (Drive: 9 plays, 75 yards, 4:58; California 31–14)
- (12:58) SMU – Kevin Jennings 3-yard run, Sam Keltner kick (Drive: 7 plays, 75 yards, 1:56; California 31–21)
- (7:59) SMU – Jordan Hudson 20-yard pass from Kevin Jennings, Sam Keltner kick) (Drive: 11 plays, 71 yards, 3:27; California 31–28)
- (2:22) SMU – T.J. Harden 1-yard run, Sam Keltner kick (Drive: 5 plays, 73 yards, 2:24; SMU 35–31)
- (0:43) CAL – Kendrick Raphael 2-yard run, Chase Meyer kick (Drive: 7 plays, 75 yards, 1:39; California 38–35)

| Statistics | SMU | CAL |
|---|---|---|
| First downs | 23 | 27 |
| Plays–yards | 67–477 | 77–452 |
| Rushes–yards | 31–227 | 37–122 |
| Passing yards | 250 | 330 |
| Passing: comp–att–int | 24–36–1 | 31–40–0 |
| Turnovers | 1 | 0 |
| Time of possession | 23:04 | 36:56 |

| Team | Category | Player | Statistics |
|---|---|---|---|
| SMU | Passing | Kevin Jennings | 24/36, 250 yards, 2 TD, INT |
| SMU | Rushing | Chris Johnson Jr. | 10 carries, 128 yards, TD |
| SMU | Receiving | Matthew Hibner | 5 receptions, 87 yards, TD |
| California | Passing | Jaron-Keawe Sagapolutele | 31/40, 330 yards, 3 TD |
| California | Rushing | Kendrick Raphael | 33 carries, 111 yards, TD |
| California | Receiving | Jacob de Jesus | 12 receptions, 97 yards, TD |

=== vs. No. 17 Arizona (2026 Holiday Bowl) ===
2026 Trust & Will Holiday Bowl
No. 17 Arizona Wildcats (9–3) vs SMU Mustangs (8–4) – Game summary

| Quarter | 1 | 2 | 3 | 4 | Total |
|---|---|---|---|---|---|
| No. 17 Wildcats | 0 | 0 | 6 | 13 | 19 |
| Mustangs | 14 | 10 | 0 | 0 | 24 |

at Snapdragon Stadium • San Diego, CA

- Date: January 2, 2026
- Game time: 7:00 p.m. CST
- Game weather: Partly cloudy • Temperature: 65 °F (18 °C) • Wind: S at 10 mph (16 km/h)
- Game attendance: 30,602
- Referee: Steve Marlowe (SEC)
- TV announcers (FOX): Gus Johnson (play-by-play), Joel Klatt (analyst) and Jenny Taft (sideline)

Game information

First quarter

- SMU – T.J. Harden 1-yard run (Sam Keltner kick), 13:58. Mustangs 7–0. Drive: 3 plays, 83 yards, 0:56.
- SMU – T.J. Harden 3-yard run (Sam Keltner kick), 4:16. Mustangs 14–0. Drive: 8 plays, 87 yards, 3:12.

Second quarter

- SMU – Stone Eby 1-yard run (Sam Keltner kick), 9:33. Mustangs 21–0. Drive: 16 plays, 94 yards, 6:47.
- SMU – Sam Keltner 24-yard field goal, 0:29. Mustangs 24–0. Drive: 13 plays, 58 yards, 4:54.

Third quarter

- ARIZ – Javin Whatley 28-yard pass from Noah Fifita (run failed), 2:37. Mustangs 24–6. Drive: 15 plays, 96 yards, 7:31.

Fourth quarter

- ARIZ – Tre Spivey 10-yard pass from Noah Fifita (pass failed), 8:40. Mustangs 24–12. Drive: 10 plays, 66 yards, 5:23.
- ARIZ – Cam Barmore 15-yard pass from Noah Fifita (Michael Salgado-Medina kick), 0:33. Mustangs 24–19. Drive: 12 plays, 75 yards, 2:10.

| Statistics | ARIZ | SMU |
|---|---|---|
| First downs | 26 | 18 |
| Plays–yards | 79–441 | 64–392 |
| Rushes–yards | 36–176 | 32–114 |
| Passing yards | 265 | 278 |
| Passing: Comp–Att–Int | 28–43–1 | 21–32–3 |
| Turnovers | 1 | 3 |
| Time of possession | 33:12 | 26:48 |

| Team | Category | Player | Statistics |
|---|---|---|---|
| Arizona | Passing | Noah Fifita | 28/43, 265 yards, 3 TD, INT |
| Arizona | Rushing | Noah Fifita | 13 carries, 73 yards |
| Arizona | Receiving | Cam Barmore | 5 receptions, 61 yards, TD |
| SMU | Passing | Kevin Jennings | 21/32, 278 yards, 3 INT |
| SMU | Rushing | T.J. Harden | 10 carries, 40 yards, 2 TD |
| SMU | Receiving | Yamir Knight | 7 receptions, 104 yards |
