= Marin Catholic High School =

Catholic high school in California, US

Location
- 675 Sir Francis Drake Boulevard; Kentfield, California 94904; United States; 37°57′7″N 122°32′13″W

Information
- Type: Private, Coeducational
- Motto: “Faith, Knowledge, Service”
- Religious affiliation: Catholic
- Established: 1949
- Oversight: Archdiocese of San Francisco
- CEEB code: 053215
- Principal: Chris Valdez
- Teaching staff: 56.5 (on an FTE basis)
- Grades: 9-12
- Enrollment: 740
- Student to teacher ratio: 13.7
- Campus: Suburban
- Colors: Navy and White
- Athletics conference: North Coast Section (NCS), Marin County Athletic League (MCAL)
- Nickname: Wildcats
- Accreditation: Western Association of Schools and Colleges
- Yearbook: Montestella
- Website: www.marincatholic.org
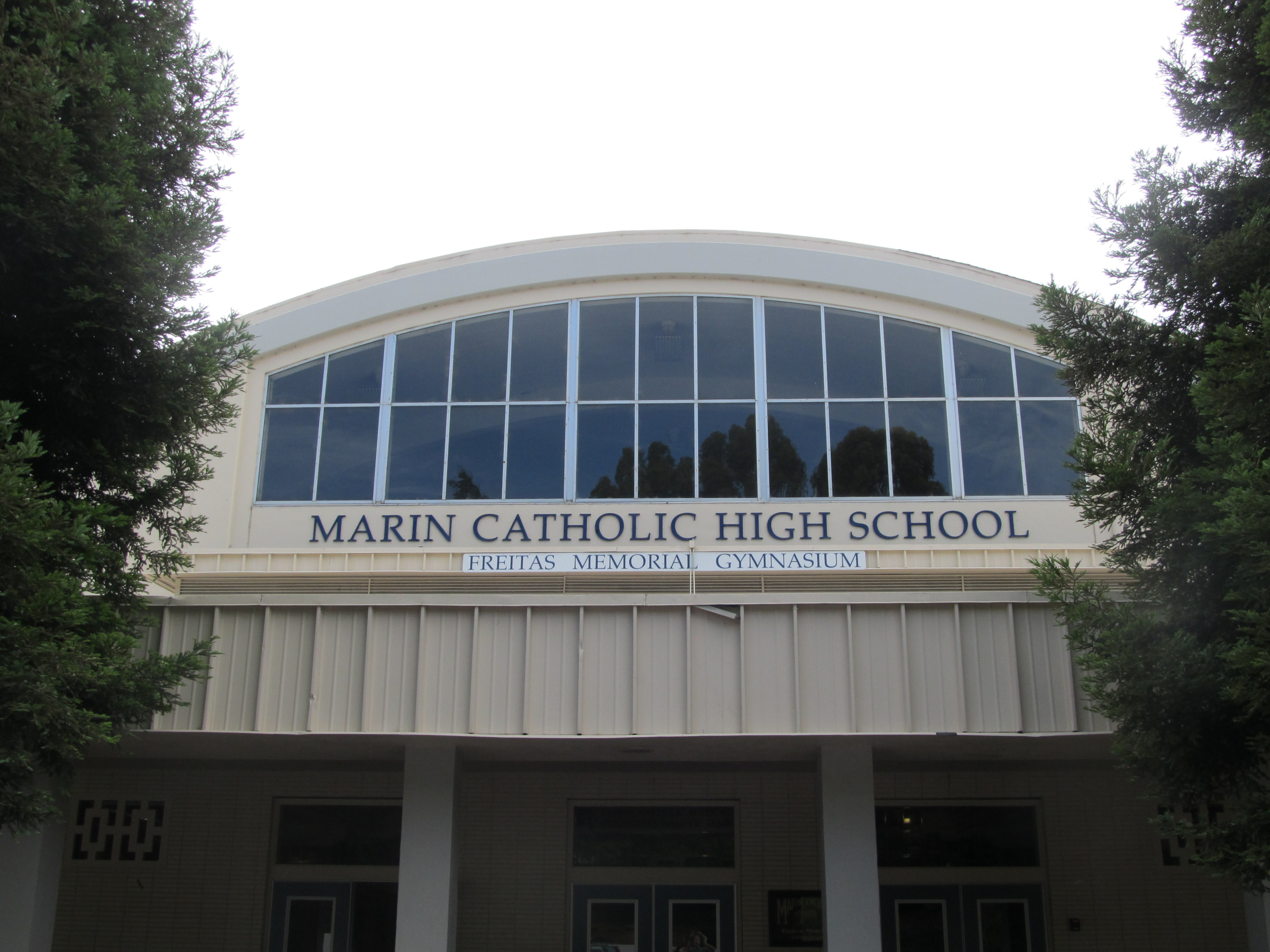

Marin Catholic High School (familiarly known as MC) is a Catholic college preparatory school located in Kentfield, Marin County, California. The school is owned by the Archdiocese of San Francisco. It was founded in 1949. Annual tuition is $27,500.

== Academics ==
Marin Catholic offers 14 Honors Classes and 17 Advanced Placement classes.

== Notable alumni ==
- Dave Anthony, entertainer
- John Boccabella, Major League Baseball (MLB) player
- Joey Calcaterra, college basketball player for the Connecticut Huskies and the San Diego Toreros
- Dan Fouts, Hall of Fame NFL quarterback (also attended St. Ignatius, San Francisco).
- Jared Goff, NFL quarterback and founder of clothing brand JG16
- Robert Hass, United States Poet Laureate
- Spencer Petras, Quarterback at the University of Iowa
- Niki Prongos, college football offensive tackle for the Stanford Cardinal
- Nick Rolovich, former head football coach at University of Hawaii and Washington State University.
