= Niki Prongos =

American football player

No. 76 – Stanford Cardinal
- Position: Offensive tackle
- Class: Redshirt Senior

Personal information
- Listed height: 6 ft 7 in (2.01 m)
- Listed weight: 315 lb (143 kg)

Career information
- High school: Marin Catholic (Kentfield, California)
- College: UCLA (2022–2024); Stanford (2025–present)
- Stats at ESPN

Niki Prongos is an American college football offensive tackle for the Stanford Cardinal. He previously played for the UCLA Bruins.

== Early life ==
Prongos attended The Branson School in Ross, California before transferring to Marin Catholic High School in Kentfield, California for his senior season. He played basketball and baseball in high school and did not play football until his senior year. Prongos played for the Lithuanian national baseball team in a qualifier for the 2021 European Championship. He committed to the University of California, Los Angeles (UCLA) to play college football.

== College career ==
Prongos played at UCLA from 2022 to 2024 appearing in 10 games with eight starts. After the 2024 season, he entered the transfer portal and transferred to Stanford University.
