= Romello Brinson =

American football player (born 2002)

Profile
- Position: Wide receiver

Personal information
- Born: January 23, 2002 (age 24)
- Listed height: 6 ft 1 in (1.85 m)
- Listed weight: 177 lb (80 kg)

Career information
- High school: Miami Northwestern Senior (Miami, Florida)
- College: Miami (FL) (2021–2022); SMU (2023–2025)
- NFL draft: 2026: undrafted

Career history
- Dallas Cowboys (2026)*
- * Offseason or practice squad member only
- Stats at Pro Football Reference

Romello Brinson (born January 23, 2002) is an American college football wide receiver. He played college football for the SMU Mustangs.

== Early life ==
Brinson attended Miami Northwestern Senior High School in Miami, Florida. As a junior in 2019, he had 43 receptions for 834 yards and eight touchdowns. He committed to the University of Miami to play college football.

== College career ==
Brinson played at Miami in 2021 and 2022, recording 14 receptions for 189 yards with one touchdown. After the 2022 season, he transferred to Southern Methodist University (SMU). In his first year at SMU in 2023, he played in all 14 games and had 28 receptions for 431 yards and two touchdowns. In the 2025, he appeared in only six games due to injury and had 13 receptions for 135 yards. Brinson returned to SMU in 2025 as the teams number one receiver. In the 2025 season, he played in 12 games, recording 43 receptions for 638 yards and three touchdowns. At the end of the season, Brinson declared for the NFL draft.

== Professional career ==
Pre-draft measurables
Height	Weight	Arm length	Hand span	Wingspan	40-yard dash	10-yard split	20-yard split	20-yard shuttle	Vertical jump	Broad jump
6 ft 1 in (1.85 m)	177 lb (80 kg)	32 3/4 in (0.83 m)	10 1/4 in (0.26 m)	6 ft 5 3/4 in (1.97 m)	4.62 s	1.63 s	2.62 s	4.37 s	35.5 in (0.90 m)	10 ft 7 in (3.23 m)
All values from Pro Day

Brinson went undrafted in the 2026 NFL draft and signed with the Dallas Cowboys on June 1, 2026. He was waived by the Cowboys on June 18.
