= CJ Williams (American football) =

American football player (born 2003)

No. 18 – Jacksonville Jaguars
- Position: Wide receiver
- Roster status: Active

Personal information
- Born: October 23, 2003 (age 23); Tuscaloosa, Alabama, U.S.
- Listed height: 6 ft 1 in (1.85 m)
- Listed weight: 205 lb (93 kg)

Career information
- High school: Mater Dei (Santa Ana, California)
- College: USC (2022); Wisconsin (2023–2024); Stanford (2025)
- NFL draft: 2026: 6th round, 203rd overall pick

Career history
- Jacksonville Jaguars (2026–present)

Awards and highlights
- Honorable mention All-ACC (2025); Irving S. Zeimer Award (2025)
- Stats at Pro Football Reference

Christian Jerome "CJ" Williams (born October 23, 2003) is an American professional football wide receiver for the Jacksonville Jaguars of the National Football League (NFL). He played college football for the USC Trojans, Wisconsin Badgers and Stanford Cardinal, and was selected by the Jaguars in the sixth round of the 2026 NFL draft.

== Early life ==
Williams was born in Tuscaloosa, Alabama, and later moved to California, where he attended and played football at Mater Dei High School in Santa Ana. Playing under head coach Bruce Rollinson, he was part of one of the nation's top high school football programs.

As a senior in 2021, Williams recorded 46 receptions for 775 yards and 12 touchdowns, helping lead Mater Dei to a 12–0 record and national, state Open Division, and CIF Southern Section Division I championships. He earned multiple honors, including PrepStar Dream Team recognition, All-CIF Division 1 honors, and All-Orange County first-team selection.

Williams was a three-time All-Trinity League selection and a two-time All-State honoree. He was also a finalist for the Maxwell Football Club National High School Player of the Year and participated in the U.S. Army All-American Bowl. In addition to football, he competed briefly in track and field.

A highly regarded recruit, Williams enrolled early at the University of Southern California in spring 2022.

== College career ==
=== USC ===
As a true freshman at USC in 2022, Williams appeared in 11 games and recorded four receptions for 34 yards.

=== Wisconsin ===
Williams transferred to the Wisconsin prior to the 2023 season and entered the program as one of the highest-rated wide receiver transfers in school history, having been a four-star recruit in the 2022 class.

In 2023, he played in all 13 games and made one start, totaling 15 receptions for 148 yards. He recorded a then-career-high five catches for 56 yards against Purdue and made his first collegiate start against Indiana. During the season, he was part of a rotation-heavy wide receiver group and saw inconsistent but steady playing time as he adjusted to Wisconsin's new offensive system under coordinator Phil Longo.

Williams' competitive playing style and high internal expectations were frequently noted by coaches and teammates, who described him as an intense competitor still adapting to a crowded receiver room and evolving offensive roles. Despite limited volume, he remained involved in the rotation and was used in both short and downfield passing situations.

As a junior in 2024, Williams appeared in all 12 games with four starts. He finished with 16 receptions for 248 yards and two touchdowns. He recorded his first collegiate touchdown against South Dakota State and added another against Iowa. He posted a season-best 60 receiving yards against Purdue and continued to contribute as part of a multi-receiver rotation. Following the season, he was named Academic All-Big Ten.

Across his first two seasons at Wisconsin, Williams was viewed internally as a high-upside receiver whose production lagged behind expectations relative to his recruiting pedigree, but whose work ethic and competitiveness kept him in the offensive rotation.

=== Stanford ===
Williams transferred to Stanford for his senior season in 2025, where he became the team's leading receiver and a vocal leader within the offense. He started 11 of 12 games and led the Cardinal with 59 receptions for 749 yards and six touchdowns, all career highs. He began the season with a three-reception, 30-yard performance in a loss to Hawaii, before developing into the focal point of Stanford's passing attack as the season progressed.

Amid injuries and roster turnover in the receiving corps, Williams served as a key presence in the group and developed a strong on-field connection with quarterback Ben Gulbranson, emphasizing consistency and leadership in his role.

He earned honorable mention All-ACC honors and received the Irving S. Zeimer Award. Among ACC receivers, he ranked seventh in receptions and ninth in receiving yards.

Williams recorded four 100-yard receiving games during the season, including three consecutive 100-yard performances, becoming the first Stanford wide receiver to accomplish the feat since Troy Walters in 1999. His top performance came against San Jose State, when he posted 11 receptions for 130 yards. He also recorded his first career multi-touchdown game against Pittsburgh.

== Professional career ==
Pre-draft measurables
Height	Weight	Arm length	Hand span	Wingspan	40-yard dash	10-yard split	20-yard split	20-yard shuttle	Three-cone drill	Vertical jump	Broad jump	Bench press
6 ft 0 7/8 in (1.85 m)	203 lb (92 kg)	30 5/8 in (0.78 m)	9 3/4 in (0.25 m)	6 ft 5 in (1.96 m)	4.53 s	1.58 s	2.68 s	4.47 s	7.40 s	35.0 in (0.89 m)	10 ft 8 in (3.25 m)	14 reps
All values from Pro Day

Williams was selected by the Jacksonville Jaguars in the sixth round (203rd overall) of the 2026 NFL draft.
