= Jordan Hudson =

American football player (born 2003)

No. 81 – Dallas Cowboys
- Position: Wide receiver
- Roster status: Practice squad

Personal information
- Born: November 22, 2003 (age 22); Garland, Texas, U.S.
- Listed height: 6 ft 1 in (1.85 m)
- Listed weight: 199 lb (90 kg)

Career information
- High school: Garland (Garland, Texas)
- College: TCU (2022); SMU (2023–2025)
- NFL draft: 2026: undrafted

Career history
- Dallas Cowboys (2026–present)

Awards and highlights
- Third-team All-ACC (2025)

Career NFL statistics as of Week 9, 2026
- Games played: 1
- Stats at Pro Football Reference

Jordan Hudson (born November 22, 2003) is an American professional football wide receiver for the Dallas Cowboys of the National Football League (NFL). He played college football for the TCU Horned Frogs and SMU Mustangs.

== Early life ==
Hudson attended Garland High School in Garland, Texas. During his junior season, he caught 80 passes for 1,285 yards and 19 touchdowns. Coming out of high school, Hudson was rated as a five-star recruit and the 12th overall prospect in the class of 2022 by ESPN; he committed to play college football for the Oklahoma Sooners over offers from other schools such as Alabama, Auburn, LSU, Miami, Oregon, Tennessee, Texas, and Texas A&M. However, he later de-committed from the Sooners and re-open his recruitment. Soon after, Hudson announced his commitment to play for the SMU Mustangs. However, he would ultimately change his commitment and sign to play for the TCU Horned Frogs.

== College career ==
=== TCU ===
As a freshman in 2022, Hudson caught 14 passes for 174 yards and three touchdowns. After the season, he entered the NCAA transfer portal.

=== SMU ===
Hudson transferred to play for the SMU Mustangs. In 2023, he played in all 14 games, recording 30 receptions for 425 yards and seven touchdowns. In 2024, Hudson caught 39 passes for 422 yards and five touchdowns. He finished his final collegiate season in 2025 with a career-high 766 receiving yards and earned third-team all-ACC honors. After the season, Hudson accepted an invite to participate in the 2026 Senior Bowl.

== Professional career ==
Pre-draft measurables
| Height | Weight | Arm length | Hand span | Wingspan | 40-yard dash | 10-yard split | 20-yard split | 20-yard shuttle | Three-cone drill | Vertical jump | Broad jump |
|---|---|---|---|---|---|---|---|---|---|---|---|
| 6 ft 1 1/4 in (1.86 m) | 191 lb (87 kg) | 31 1/8 in (0.79 m) | 9 1/4 in (0.23 m) | 6 ft 2 5/8 in (1.90 m) | 4.59 s | 1.63 s | 2.57 s | 4.40 s | 7.21 s | 32.0 in (0.81 m) | 10 ft 2 in (3.10 m) |
All values from NFL Combine/Pro Day

After not being selected in the 2026 NFL draft, Hudson was signed by the Dallas Cowboys as an undrafted free agent. On August 30 he was waived as a part of final roster cuts and signed to the practice squad the next day.
