= 2023 Stanford Cardinal football team =

American college football season

2023 Stanford Cardinal football
- Conference: Pac-12 Conference
- Record: 3–9 (2–7 Pac-12)
- Head coach: Troy Taylor (1st season)
- Offensive scheme: West Coast
- Defensive coordinator: Bobby April (1st season)
- Base defense: 2–4–5
- Home stadium: Stanford Stadium

2023 Pac-12 Conference football standings
	Conf.			Overall
Team	W		L	W		L
No. 2 Washington y$^	9	–	0	14	–	1
No. 6 Oregon y	8	–	1	12	–	2
No. 11 Arizona	7	–	2	10	–	3
Oregon State	5	–	4	8	–	5
Utah	5	–	4	8	–	5
USC	5	–	4	8	–	5
California	4	–	5	6	–	7
UCLA	4	–	5	8	–	5
Washington State	2	–	7	5	–	7
Stanford	2	–	7	3	–	9
Arizona State*	2	–	7	3	–	9
Colorado	1	–	8	4	–	8
Championship: Washington 34, Oregon 31
^ – College Football Playoff participant; $ – Conference champion; y – Championship game participant; * – Ineligible for postseason play due to self-imposed ban for 2020 recruiting violations; Rankings from AP Poll

The 2023 Stanford Cardinal football team represented Stanford University in the Pac-12 Conference during the 2023 NCAA Division I FBS football season. Led by new head coach Troy Taylor, the Cardinal played its home games on campus at Stanford Stadium in Stanford, California. The Stanford Cardinal football team drew an average home attendance of 33,219 in 2023.

This was Stanford's final season in the Pac-12 Conference before they moved to the Atlantic Coast Conference in 2024.

Taylor was hired in December 2022 and was previously the head coach at Sacramento State.

== Offseason ==
=== Team departures ===
2023 Stanford offseason departures
Name	Number	Pos.	Height, Weight	Year	Hometown	Notes
Michael Wilson	#4	WR	6'2", 213	Graduate Student	Simi Valley, CA	Graduated/Entered 2023 NFL draft
Elijah Higgins	#6	WR	6'3", 234	Senior	Tampa, FL	Entered 2023 NFL Draft
Kyu Blu Kelly	#17	CB	6'0", 193	Senior	Las Vegas, NV	Entered 2023 NFL Draft
Tanner McKee	#18	QB	6'6", 230	Junior	Irvine, CA	Entered 2023 NFL Draft
Kendall Williamson	#21	S	6'0", 205	Graduate Student	Snellville, GA	Graduated/Entered 2023 NFL Draft
Barrett Miller	#63	T	6'5", 270	Senior	Aurora, CO	Transferred to California
Bradley Archer	#87	TE	6'4", 240	Senior	Livermore, CA	Transferred to Indiana
Salim Turner-Muhammad	#4	CB	6'0", 200	Senior	Alexandria, VA	Transferred to Purdue
Drake Metcalf	#55	C	6'2", 276	Junior	Bellflower, CA	Transferred to UCF
Walter Rouse	#75	T	6'6", 313	Senior	Silver Spring, MD	Transferred to Oklahoma
Colby Bowman	#9	WR	6'2", 190	Senior	Bellflower, CA	Transferred to Utah State
Aeneas DiCosmo	#0	LB	6'3", 220	Senior	Oradell, NJ	Transferred to Vanderbilt
Drake Nugent	#60	C	6'1", 298	Senior	Littleton, CO	Transferred to Michigan
Stephen Herron Jr.	#15	LB	6'3", 240	Senior	Louisville, KY	Transferred to Louisville
Myles Hinton	#78	T	6'6", 308	Junior	Norcross, GA	Transferred to Michigan
Jake Hornibrook	#73	G	6'5", 300	Senior	Malvern, PA	Transferred to Duke
Ryan Sanborn	#27	P	6'3", 195	Senior	San Diego, CA	Transferred to Texas
Arlen Harris Jr.	#33	RB	5'11", 189	Freshman	Saint Peters, MO	Transferred to Iowa State
Jonathan McGill	#2	CB	5'9", 175	Senior	Coppell, TX	Transferred to SMU
Levani Damuni	#2	LB	6'2", 225	Senior	Millville, UT	Transferred to Utah
Jacob Mangum-Farrar	#14	LB	6'3", 210	Graduate Student	Sugar Land, TX	Transferred to Indiana
Nicolas Toomer	#6	CB	6'2", 185	Senior	Tyrone, GA	Transferred to Indiana
Thunder Keck	#11	EDGE	6'2", 245	6th Year-Senior	Northfield, NH	Graduated
Ethan Bonner	#13	CB	6'1", 190	5th Year-Senior	The Woodlands, TX	Graduated
Danny McFadden	#20	RB	5'8", 175	Sophomore	Sunfish Lake, MN	Left team
Caleb Robinson	#21	RB	5'10", 202	Junior	Silver Spring, MD	Left team
Jason Kaul	#22	LB	6'3", 225	Senior	Ham Lake, MN	Graduated
Patrick Fields	#24	S	6'0", 203	5th Year-Senior	Tulsa, OK	Graduated
Jay Symonds	#24	FB	6'3", 251	5th Year-Senior	Melrose, MA	Graduated
Ricky Miezan	#45	LB	6'2", 237	5th Year-Senior	Alexandria, VA	Transferred to Virginia
Max Kalny	#68	G	6'4", 298	Junior	Lenexa, KS	Left team
Jason Amsler	#70	T	6'5", 320	Sophomore	Franklin, TN	Left team
Brycen Tremayne	#81	WR	6'4", 212	5th year-Senior	Los Angeles, CA	Graduated
Jacob Katona	#96	DL	6'4", 272	Sophomore	Birmingham, AL	Transferred to Vanderbilt

=== Incoming transfers ===
2023 Stanford incoming transfers
Name	Number	Pos.	Height, Weight	Year	Hometown	Notes
Chico Holt	#46	TE	6'4", 220	Freshman	Houston TX	Transferred From Northwestern
Spencer Lytle	#57	LB	6'3", 215	Junior	Bellflower, CA	Transferred From Wisconsin
Justin Lamson	#8	QB	6'3", 210	Sophomore	El Dorado, CA	Transferred From Syracuse
Trevor Mayberry	#61	OL	6'3", 260	Junior	Tampa, FL	Transferred From Penn
Alec Bank	#58	OL	6'4", 265	Junior	Rancho Santa Margarita, CA	Transferred From Harvard
Gaethan Bernadel	#0	LB	6'1", 210	Junior	Hallandale, FL	Transferred From FIU

=== Recruiting class ===
College recruiting
Name	Hometown	School	Height	Weight	Commit date
Jshawn Frausto-Ramos; CB	Los Angeles, CA	St. John Bosco High School	6 ft 0 in (1.83 m)	175 lb (79 kg)	May 30, 2022
Jshawn Frausto-Ramos; CB	Recruit ratings: Rivals: 247Sports: On3: ESPN: (80)				
Ahmari Borden; WR	Bainbridge, GA	Robert F. Munroe Day School	6 ft 3 in (1.91 m)	180 lb (82 kg)	Mar 12, 2022
Ahmari Borden; WR	Recruit ratings: Rivals: 247Sports: On3: ESPN: (80)				
Myles Jackson; QB	Lakewood, CA	Millikan High School	6 ft 2 in (1.88 m)	190 lb (86 kg)	Dec 8, 2022
Myles Jackson; QB	Recruit ratings: Rivals: 247Sports: On3: ESPN: (78)				
Sedrick Irvin Jr. RB	Miami, FL	Christopher Columbus High School	5 ft 10 in (1.78 m)	177 lb (80 kg)	Jun 30, 2022
Sedrick Irvin Jr. RB	Recruit ratings: Rivals: 247Sports: On3: ESPN: (80)				
Tiger Bachmeier; WR	Lake Elsinore, CA	Murrieta Valley High School	6 ft 1 in (1.85 m)	180 lb (82 kg)	Mar 1, 2022
Tiger Bachmeier; WR	Recruit ratings: Rivals: 247Sports: On3: ESPN: (77)				
Simione Pale; OL	Elk Grove, CA	Elk Grove High School	6 ft 3 in (1.91 m)	320 lb (150 kg)	Jul 1, 2022
Simione Pale; OL	Recruit ratings: Rivals: 247Sports: On3: ESPN: (81)				
Jackson Harris; WR	Berkeley, CA	Berkeley High School	6 ft 3 in (1.91 m)	195 lb (88 kg)	Nov 28, 2022
Jackson Harris; WR	Recruit ratings: Rivals: 247Sports: On3: ESPN: (80)				
Luke Baklenko; OL	Thousand Oaks, CA	Oaks Christian School	6 ft 6 in (1.98 m)	295 lb (134 kg)	Jun 22, 2022
Luke Baklenko; OL	Recruit ratings: Rivals: 247Sports: On3: ESPN: (79)				
Gavin Geweniger; DL	Scottsdale, AZ	Chaparral High School	6 ft 4 in (1.93 m)	245 lb (111 kg)	Jun 20, 2022
Gavin Geweniger; DL	Recruit ratings: Rivals: 247Sports: On3: ESPN: (74)				
Tre Williams; LB	Farmers Branch, TX	Parish Episcopal School	6 ft 2 in (1.88 m)	225 lb (102 kg)	Oct 5, 2022
Tre Williams; LB	Recruit ratings: Rivals: 247Sports: On3: ESPN: (76)				
Charlie Symonds; T	South Kent, CT	Taft School	6 ft 7 in (2.01 m)	265 lb (120 kg)	Dec 20, 2022
Charlie Symonds; T	Recruit ratings: Rivals: 247Sports: On3: ESPN: (77)				
Ismael Cisse; WR	Denver, CO	Cherry Creek High School	6 ft 1 in (1.85 m)	180 lb (82 kg)	Dec 14, 2022
Ismael Cisse; WR	Recruit ratings: Rivals: 247Sports: On3: ESPN: (75)				
Caleb Hampton; RB	Ooltewah, TN	Baylor School	6 ft 0 in (1.83 m)	205 lb (93 kg)	Nov 5, 2022
Caleb Hampton; RB	Recruit ratings: Rivals: 247Sports: On3:				
Che Ojarikre; S	Alpharetta, GA	Denmark High School	6 ft 2 in (1.88 m)	180 lb (82 kg)	Jan 24, 2023
Che Ojarikre; S	Recruit ratings: Rivals: 247Sports: On3: ESPN: (75)				
Omar Staples; LB	Oakland, CA	Oakland Technical High School	6 ft 3 in (1.91 m)	215 lb (98 kg)	Dec 21, 2022
Omar Staples; LB	Recruit ratings: Rivals: 247Sports: On3: ESPN: (76)				
Aaron Morris; CB	Exeter, NH	Phillips Exeter Academy	5 ft 11 in (1.80 m)	186 lb (84 kg)	Dec 21, 2022
Aaron Morris; CB	Recruit ratings: Rivals: 247Sports: On3: ESPN: (76)				
Braden Marceau-Olayinka; DL	Melrose, MA	Melrose High School	6 ft 3 in (1.91 m)	265 lb (120 kg)	Jan 23, 2023
Braden Marceau-Olayinka; DL	Recruit ratings: Rivals: 247Sports: On3: ESPN: (73)				
Tyler Kuo; WR	Austin, TX	Regents School of Austin	6 ft 3 in (1.91 m)	202 lb (92 kg)	
Tyler Kuo; WR	Recruit ratings: No ratings found				
Zak Yamauchi; OL	Las Vegas, NV	Bishop Gorman High School	6 ft 5 in (1.96 m)	280 lb (130 kg)	Jul 26, 2022
Zak Yamauchi; OL	Recruit ratings: Rivals: 247Sports: On3: ESPN: (78)				
Overall recruit ranking: On3: 45
‡ Refers to 40-yard dash; Note: In many cases, Scout, Rivals, 247Sports, On3, and ESPN may conflict in their listings of height, weight and 40 time.; In these cases, the average was taken. ESPN grades are on a 100-point scale.; Sources: "2024 Team Ranking". Rivals.com.

== Personnel ==
=== Coaching staff ===
Name	Position	Stanford years	Alma mater
Troy Taylor	Head coach / Offensive coordinator / Quarterbacks coach	1st	California (1990)
Bobby April III	Defensive coordinator / outside linebackers coach	1st	Louisiana–Lafayette (1996)
Bob Gregory	Safeties coach / Special teams coordinator	1st	Washington State (1986)
Malcolm Agnew	Running backs coach	1st	Southern Illinois (2015)
Nate Byham	Tight ends coach	1st	Pittsburgh (2010)
Mark D'Onofrio	Inside linebackers coach	1st	Penn State (1991)
Al Netter	Co-Offensive Line Coach	1st	Northwestern (2011)
Viane Talamaivao	Co-Offensive Line Coach	1st	USC (2018)
Ross Kolodziej	Defensive Line	1st	Wisconsin (2001)

== Schedule ==
Date	Time	Opponent	Site	TV	Result	Attendance
September 1	8:00 p.m.	at Hawaii*	Clarence T. C. Ching Athletics Complex; Honolulu, HI	CBSSN	W 37–24	13,739
September 9	7:30 p.m.	at No. 6 USC	Los Angeles Memorial Coliseum; Los Angeles, CA (rivalry)	FOX	L 10–56	67,213
September 16	5:00 p.m.	No. 8 (FCS) Sacramento State*	Stanford Stadium; Stanford, CA	P12N	L 23–30	23,848
September 23	4:00 p.m.	Arizona	Stanford Stadium; Stanford, CA	P12N	L 20–21	38,046
September 30	3:30 p.m.	No. 9 Oregon	Stanford Stadium; Stanford, CA (rivalry)	P12N	L 6–42	32,160
October 13	7:00 p.m.	at Colorado	Folsom Field; Boulder, CO	ESPN	W 46–43 ^{2OT}	53,154
October 21	7:30 p.m.	No. 25 UCLA^{†}	Stanford Stadium; Stanford, CA (rivalry)	ESPN	L 7–42	30,225
October 28	4:00 p.m.	No. 5 Washington	Stanford Stadium; Stanford, CA	FS1	L 33–42	24,380
November 4	6:00 p.m.	at Washington State	Martin Stadium; Pullman, WA	P12N	W 10–7	24,385
November 11	2:30 p.m.	at No. 12 Oregon State	Reser Stadium; Corvallis, OR	P12N	L 17–62	37,107
November 18	3:30 p.m.	California	Stanford Stadium; Stanford, CA (Big Game)	P12N	L 15–27	52,971
November 25	4:00 p.m.	No. 18 Notre Dame*	Stanford Stadium; Stanford, CA (rivalry)	P12N	L 23–56	30,901
*Non-conference game; ^{†}Homecoming; Rankings from Coaches' Poll released prior to the game; All times are in Pacific time

== Roster ==
2023 Stanford Cardinal football team roster
Players
Coaches
Offense

Pos.	#	Name	Class
WR	0	Mudia Reuben	So
RB	2	Casey Filkins	Sr
WR	3	Bryce Farrell	Sr
WR	5	John Humphreys	Sr
QB	8	Justin Lamson	So
QB	9	Myles Jackson	Fr
QB	10	Beau Nelson	Sr
QB	11	Ari Patu	Jr
WR	13	Elic Ayomanor	So
QB	14	Ashton Daniels	So
RB	15	Ryan Butler	So
QB	17	Charlie Mirer	So
WR	19	Silas Starr	Sr
RB	22	E. J. Smith	Sr
RB	23	Jacob Lowe	So
WR	24	Tiger Bachmeier	Fr
WR	25	Ismael Cisse	Fr
RB	26	Sedrick Irvin	Fr
RB	33	Kenaj Washington	So
RB	34	Caleb Hampton	Fr
WR	37	Myles Libman	Fr
RB	38	Brendon Barrow	Jr
WR	39	Brayden Hagle	Fr
WR	39	Tyler Kuo	Fr
TE	46	Chico Holt	Fr
WR	49	Evan Jackson	Jr
OL	52	Lucas Heyer	So
OL	55	Simione Pale	Fr
OL	57	Levi Rogers	Sr
OL	58	Alec Bank	Jr
OL	61	Trevor Mayberry	Jr
OL	65	Allen Thomason	Fr
OL	67	Fisher Anderson	So
OL	69	Jake Maikkula	So
OL	71	Connor McLaughlin	Sr
OL	73	Charlie Symonds	Fr
OL	74	James Pogorelc	Sr
OL	76	Jack Leyrer	Jr
OL	77	Logan Berzins	Sr
OL	78	Luke Baklenko	Fr
WR	80	David Kasemervisz	Jr
WR	81	Ahmari Borden	Fr
WR	82	Jayson Raines	Jr
WR	83	Jackson Harris	Fr
TE	84	Benjamin Yurosek	Sr
TE	85	Shield Taylor	Jr
TE	86	Sam Roush	So
WR	87	Jason Thompson	So
TE	88	C.J. Hawkins	So
TE	89	Lukas Ungar	Sr

Defense

Pos.	#	Name	Class
ILB	0	Gaethan Bernadel	Jr
CB	4	Zahran Manley	GS
CB	6	Collin Wright	So
ILB	8	Tristan Sinclair	GS
OLB	9	Aaron Armitage	Jr
ILB	10	Spencer Jorgensen	GS
OLB	11	Tevarua Tafiti	So
OLB	14	Wilfredo Aybar	Jr
CB	17	Jshawn Frausto-Ramos	Fr
S	18	Jimmy Wyrick	Jr
CB	20	Jaden Slocum	Jr
S	21	Scotty Edwards	So
S	22	Ché Ojarikre	Fr
OLB	23	David Bailey	So
S	27	Omari Porter	Sr
CB	28	Joshua Thompson	So
CB	29	Terian Williams	So
ILB	30	Ese Dubre	Jr
CB	31	Aaron Morris	Fr
S	32	Mitch Leigber	Jr
S	33	Alaka'i Gilman	Sr
ILB	35	Matt Rose	So
OLB	36	Tre Williams	Fr
S	38	Kale Lucas	Jr
DL	40	Tobin Phillips	Sr
ILB	41	Anson Pulsipher	So
OLB	44	Ernest Cooper	So
OLB	45	Omar Staples	Fr
DB	46	Caymus Rooney	Fr
CB	47	Caleb Ellis	Jr
ILB	48	Benjamin Hudson	So
DB	49	Adam Rourke	Fr
DL	50	R. J. Gaskins	Fr
DL	51	Jaxson Moi	So
ILB	53	Carson Berger	Fr
ILB	54	Kiersten Lee	Sr
DL	55	Matthew Merritt	Sr
ILB	56	Miles McGee	Fr
ILB	57	Spencer Lytle	Jr
DL	72	Austin Uke	Jr
DL	75	Braden Marceau-Olayinka	Fr
OLB	90	Gavin Geweniger	Fr
DL	91	Pat Caughey	So
OLB	92	Lance Keneley	Sr
DL	94	Anthony Franklin	Jr
DL	95	Aristotle Taylor	Jr
DL	97	Zach Rowell	So
DL	98	Zach Buckey	Jr
DL	99	Zephron Lester	Sr

Special teams

Pos.	#	Name	Class
K	13	Emmet Kenney	Jr
P	15	Connor Weselman	Jr
P/K	37	Aidan Flintoft	Fr
LS	42	Bailey Parsons	Sr
K	43	Joshua Karty	Sr
LS	47	Alejando Chavez	So
LS	93	Peyton Warford	So

Head coach

- Troy Taylor – Offensive coordinator/quarterbacks

Coordinators/assistant coaches

- Bobby April III – Defensive coordinator/outside linebackers
- Bob Gregory – Special teams coordinator/safeties
- Malcolm Agnew – Running backs
- Nate Byham – Tight ends
- Mark D'Onofrio – Inside linebackers
- Al Netter – Co-offensive linemen
- Viane Talamaivao – Co-offensive linemen
- Ross Kolodziej – Defensive linemen
- Tyler Osborne – Wide receivers/assistant quarterbacks
- Paul Williams – Cornerbacks
- Ryan Deatrick – Director, Strength and Conditioning
- Dylan Cruz – Offensive quality control analyst
- Corey Edsall – Offensive quality control analyst
- Tsuyoshi Kawata – Offensive quality control analyst
- Vavae Malepeai – Offensive quality control analyst
- Ryan Bright – Defensive quality control analyst
- Justin Woodley – Defensive quality control analyst
- Fred Guidici – Special teams control analyst
- Thomas Merkle – Offensive graduate assistant
- Jonathan McDonald – Defensive graduate assistant
- Jacob Russell – Defensive graduate assistant

Legend

- (C) Team captain
- (S) Suspended
- (I) Ineligible
- Injured
- Redshirt

Roster
Last update: September 4, 2023

== Game summaries ==
=== at Hawaii ===
Stanford Cardinal (0–0) at Hawaii Rainbow Warriors (0–1) – Game summary

Quarter	1	2	3	4	Total
Cardinal	7	14	6	10	37
Rainbow Warriors	0	10	0	14	24

at Clarence T. C. Ching Athletics Complex • Honolulu, HI

- Date: September 1, 2023
- Game time: 6:00 p.m. HST
- Game weather: Sunny, 88 °F (31 °C)
- Game attendance: 13,739
- Referee: Matthew Richards
- TV announcers (CBSSN): Dave Ryan (play-by-play), Robert Turbin (analyst)

Game information

First quarter

- (7:25) STAN – E. J. Smith 1-yard run, Joshua Karty kick (Drive: 12 plays, 72 yards, 4:17; Stanford 7–0)

Second quarter

- (14:11) HAW – Pofele Ashlock 7-yard pass from Brayden Schager, Matthew Shipley kick (Drive: 11 plays, 75 yards, 5:48; Tied 7–7)
- (12:24) STAN – Benjamin Yurosek 32-yard pass from Ashton Daniels, Joshua Karty kick (Drive: 5 plays, 75 yards, 1:47; Stanford 14–7)
- (4:25) STAN – Bryce Farrell 2-yard run, Joshua Karty kick (Drive: 11 plays, 66 yards, 5:59; Stanford 21–7)
- (0:00) HAW – Matthew Shipley 32-yard field goal (Drive: 9 plays, 65 yards, 1:03; Stanford 21–10)

Third quarter

- (11:07) STAN – Joshua Karty 25-yard field goal (Drive: 7 plays, 68 yards, 3:53; Stanford 24–10)
- (1:35) STAN – Joshua Karty 25-yard field goal (Drive: 13 plays, 75 yards, 6:28; Stanford 27–10)

Fourth quarter

- (14:52) HAW – Steven McBride 24-yard pass from Brayden Schager (Drive: 5 plays, 75 yards, 1:43; Stanford 27–16)
- (9:15) STAN – Joshua Karty 46-yard field goal (Drive: 9 plays, 47 yards, 5:37; Stanford 30–16)
- (5:30) STAN – John Humphreys 13-yard pass from Ashton Daniels, Joshua Karty kick (Drive: 3 plays, 31 yards, 1:35; Stanford 37–16)
- (1:08) HAW – Pofele Ashlock 16-yard pass from Brayden Schager, Brayden Schager two-point pass to Devon Tauaefa (Drive: 15 plays, 64 yards, 4:14; Stanford 37–24)

Statistics	STAN	HAW
First downs	24	20
Total yards	406	350
Rushes/yards	34–158	16–-5
Passing yards	248	355
Passing: Comp–Att–Int	25–36–0	30–53–0
Time of possession	33:55	26:05

Team	Category	Player	Statistics
Stanford	Passing	Ashton Daniels	25–36, 248 yards, 2 TD
Stanford	Rushing	Casey Filkins	6 carries, 67 yards
Stanford	Receiving	Benjamin Yurosek	9 receptions, 138 yards, TD
Hawaii	Passing	Brayden Schager	30–53, 355 yards, 3 TD
Hawaii	Rushing	Tylan Hines	5 carries, 5 yards
Hawaii	Receiving	Pofele Ashlock	8 receptions, 114 yards, 2 TD

=== at No. 6 USC ===
Stanford Cardinal (1–0) at No. 6 USC Trojans (2–0) – Game summary

Quarter	1	2	3	4	Total
Cardinal	0	3	0	7	10
No. 6 Trojans	21	28	0	7	56

at Los Angeles Memorial Coliseum • Los Angeles, CA

- Date: September 9, 2023
- Game time: 7:30 p.m.
- Game weather: Cloudy, 79 °F (26 °C)
- Game attendance: 67,213
- Referee: Mark Duddy
- TV announcers (FOX): Tim Brando (play-by-play), Spencer Tillman (analyst), Josh Sims (sideline)

Game information

First quarter

- (11:59) USC – Caleb Williams 21-yard rush, Denis Lynch kick (Drive: 8 plays, 75 yards, 3:01; USC 7–0)
- (9:05) USC – MarShawn Lloyd 5-yard rush, Denis Lynch kick (Drive: 3 plays, 19 yards, 1:22; USC 14–0)
- (0:07) USC - Austin Jones 1-yard rush, Denis Lynch kick (Drive: 12 plays, 93 yards, 4:55; USC 21–0)

Second quarter

- (13:43) USC – Zachariah Branch 75-yard punt return, Denis Lynch kick (Drive: 3 plays, -5 yards, 1:17; USC 28–0)
- (10:42) USC – Dorian Singer 19-yard pass from Caleb Williams, Denis Lynch kick (Drive: 5 plays, 55 yards, 2:01; USC 34–0)
- (6:57) STAN – Joshua Karty 38-yard field goal (Drive: 9 plays, 55 yards, 3:45; USC 34–3)
- (6:46) USC – Brenden Rice 75-yard pass from Caleb Williams, Denis Lynch kick (Drive: 1 play, 75 yards, 0:11; USC 41–3)
- (0:10) USC – Lake McRee 1-yard pass from Caleb Williams, Denis Lynch kick (Drive: 7 plays, 80 yards, 3:24; USC 49–3)

Third quarter

None

Fourth quarter

- (3:35) STAN – Justin Lamson 1-yard rush, Joshua Karty kick (Drive: 10 plays, 79 yards, 5:13; USC 49–10)
- (0:58) USC – Miller Moss 15-yard rush, Denis Lynch kick (Drive: 7 plays, 75 yards, 2:37; USC 56–10)

Statistics	STAN	USC
First downs	20	27
Total yards	349	573
Rushes/yards	41–209	28–180
Passing yards	140	393
Passing: Comp–Att–Int	10–25–1	30–36–0
Time of possession	32:08	27:52

Team	Category	Player	Statistics
Stanford	Passing	Justin Lamson	8/18, 121 yards
Stanford	Rushing	Casey Filkins	5 carries, 63 yards
Stanford	Receiving	Benjamin Yurosek	4 receptions, 54 yards
USC	Passing	Caleb Williams	19/21, 281 yards, 3 TD
USC	Rushing	MarShawn Lloyd	9 carries, 77 yards, TD
USC	Receiving	Brenden Rice	1 reception, 75 yards, TD

=== vs Sacramento State (FCS) ===
Sacramento State Hornets (2–0) vs Stanford Cardinal (1–1) – Game summary

Quarter	1	2	3	4	Total
Hornets	3	14	3	10	30
Cardinal	7	7	3	6	23

at Stanford Stadium • Stanford, CA

- Date: September 16, 2023
- Game time: 5:00 p.m.
- Game weather: Sunny, 61 °F (16 °C)
- Game attendance: 23,848
- Referee: Justin Elliott
- TV announcers (Pac-12 Network): Elise Woodward (play-by-play), Greg Camarillo (analyst)

Game information

First quarter

- (6:34) STAN – Casey Filkins 1-yard run, Joshua Karty kick (Drive: 13 plays, 79 yards, 6:30; Stanford 7–0)
- (0:44) SAC – Zach Schreiner 24-yard field goal (Drive: 13 plays, 69 yards, 5:50; Stanford 7–3)

Second quarter

- (13:07) STAN – Elic Ayomanor 51-yard pass from Ashton Daniels, Joshua Karty kick (Drive: 7 plays, 74 yards, 2:37; Stanford 14–3)
- (6:01) SAC – Elijah Tau-Tolliver 1-yard run, Zach Schreiner kick (Drive: 11 plays, 80 yards, 4:33; Stanford 14–10)
- (0:35) SAC – Kaiden Bennett 2-yard run, Zach Schreiner kick (Drive: 13 plays, 77 yards, 4:21; Sacramento State 17–14)

Third quarter

- (10:35) STAN – Joshua Karty 41-yard field goal (Drive: 8 plays, 56 yards, 4:25; Tied 17–17)
- (2:25) SAC – Zach Schreiner 22-yard field goal (Drive: 7 plays, 17 yards, 2:31; Sacramento State 20–17)

Fourth quarter

- (13:30) STAN – Joshua Karty 40-yard field goal (Drive: 7 plays, 53 yards, 3:55; Tied 20–20)
- (8:53) STAN – Joshua Karty 39-yard field goal (Drive: 7 plays, 14 yards, 2:51; Stanford 23–20)
- (4:13) SAC – Zach Schreiner 44-yard field goal (Drive: 9 plays, 49 yards, 4:40; Tied 23–23)
- (1:32) SAC – Marcus Fisher 49-yard pass from Kaiden Bennett, Zach Schreiner kick (Drive: 3 plays, 53 yards, 0:51; Sacramento State 30–23)

Statistics	SAC	STAN
First downs	23	18
Total yards	448	387
Rushes/yards	36–169	42–180
Passing yards	279	207
Passing: Comp–Att–Int	21–33–2	11–24–2
Time of possession	30:57	29:03

Team	Category	Player	Statistics
Sacramento State	Passing	Kaiden Bennett	21/33, 279 yards, TD, 2 INT
Sacramento State	Rushing	Kaiden Bennett	13 carries, 100 yards, TD
Sacramento State	Receiving	Devin Gandy	5 receptions, 64 yards
Stanford	Passing	Justin Lamson	7/17, 138 yards, INT
Stanford	Rushing	E. J. Smith	9 carries, 71 yards
Stanford	Receiving	Elic Ayomanor	4 receptions, 89 yards, TD

=== vs Arizona ===
Arizona Wildcats (2–1) vs Stanford Cardinal (1–2) – Game summary

Quarter	1	2	3	4	Total
Wildcats	0	7	7	7	21
Cardinal	3	7	7	3	20

at Stanford Stadium • Stanford, CA

- Date: September 23, 2023
- Game time: 4:00 p.m.
- Game weather: Sunny, 66 °F (19 °C)
- Game attendance: 38,046
- Referee: Mike McCabe
- TV announcers (Pac-12 Network): Ted Robinson (play-by-play), Yogi Roth (analyst)

Game information

First quarter

- (10:35) STAN – Joshua Karty 35-yard field goal (Drive: 7 plays, 38 yards, 3:39; Stanford 3–0)

Second quarter

- (13:37) ARIZ – Tanner McLachlan 36-yard pass from Jayden de Laura, Tyler Loop kick (Drive: 3 plays, 67 yards, 1:23; Arizona 7–3)
- (5:44) STAN – Bryce Farrell 2-yard run, Joshua Karty kick (Drive: 10 plays, 50 yards, 4:58; Stanford 10–7)

Third quarter

- (5:53) ARIZ – Jayden de Laura 7-yard run, Tyler Loop kick (Drive: 11 plays, 66 yards, 5:45; Arizona 14–10)
- (1:49) STAN – Sedrick Irvin 1-yard run, Joshua Karty kick (Drive: 11 plays, 75 yards, 4:04; Stanford 17–14)

Fourth quarter

- (7:42) ARIZ – D. J. Williams 2-yard run, Tyler Loop kick (Drive: 9 plays, 67 yards, 3:58; Arizona 21–17)
- (3:09) STAN – Joshua Karty 46-yard field goal (Drive: 10 plays, 47 yards, 4:34; Arizona 21–20)

Statistics	ARIZ	STAN
First downs	20	19
Total yards	349	358
Rushes/yards	37–145	35–112
Passing yards	204	246
Passing: Comp–Att–Int	18–30–0	18–32–0
Time of possession	28:51	31:09

Team	Category	Player	Statistics
Arizona	Passing	Jayden de Laura	14/26, 157 yards, TD
Arizona	Rushing	Jonah Coleman	12 carries, 75 yards
Arizona	Receiving	Jacob Cowing	8 receptions, 85 yards
Stanford	Passing	Ashton Daniels	14/26, 198 yards
Stanford	Rushing	Sedrick Irvin	10 carries, 66 yards, TD
Stanford	Receiving	Tiger Bachmeier	4 receptions, 93 yards

=== vs No. 9 Oregon ===
No. 9 Oregon Ducks (4–0) vs Stanford Cardinal (1–3) – Game summary

Quarter	1	2	3	4	Total
No. 9 Ducks	0	14	21	7	42
Cardinal	3	3	0	0	6

at Stanford Stadium • Stanford, CA

- Date: September 30, 2023
- Game time: 3:30 p.m.
- Game weather: Sunny, 64 °F (18 °C)
- Game attendance: 32,160
- Referee: John Love
- TV announcers (Pac-12 Network): Roxy Bernstein (play-by-play), Lincoln Kennedy (analyst)

Game information

First quarter

- (7:18) STAN – Joshua Karty 37-yard field goal (Drive: 15 plays, 46 yards, 7:42; Stanford 3–0)

Second quarter

- (14:55) STAN – Joshua Karty 53-yard field goal (Drive: 13 plays, 51 yards, 6:00; Stanford 6–0)
- (8:15) ORE – Jordan James 30-yard run, Camden Lewis kick (Drive: 6 plays, 69 yards, 2:18; Oregon 7–6)
- (2:23) ORE – Bucky Irving 17-yard run, Camden Lewis kick (Drive: 8 plays, 76 yards, 4:02; Oregon 14–6)

Third quarter

- (10:43) ORE – Terrance Ferguson 10-yard pass from Bo Nix, Camden Lewis kick (Drive: 10 plays, 80 yards, 4:17; Oregon 21–6)
- (8:54) ORE – Troy Franklin 46-yard pass from Bo Nix, Camden Lewis kick (Drive: 4 plays, 64 yards, 1:04; Oregon 28–6)
- (1:43) ORE – Troy Franklin 5-yard pass from Bo Nix, Camden Lewis kick (Drive: 7 plays, 73 yards, 2:19; Oregon 35–6)

Fourth quarter

- (11:33) ORE – Traeshon Holden 9-yard pass from Bo Nix, Camden Lewis kick (Drive: 7 plays, 59 yards, 2:41; Oregon 42–6)

Statistics	ORE	STAN
First downs	26	16
Total yards	506	222
Rushes/yards	28–208	46–89
Passing yards	298	133
Passing: Comp–Att–Int	28–33–0	14–24–0
Time of possession	24:24	35:36

Team	Category	Player	Statistics
Oregon	Passing	Bo Nix	27/32, 290 yards, 4 TD
Oregon	Rushing	Bucky Irving	13 carries, 88 yards, TD
Oregon	Receiving	Troy Franklin	7 receptions, 117 yards, 2 TD
Stanford	Passing	Justin Lamson	11/20, 106 yards
Stanford	Rushing	Justin Lamson	22 carries, 32 yards
Stanford	Receiving	Mudia Reuben	4 receptions, 40 yards

=== at Colorado ===
Stanford Cardinal (1–4) at Colorado Buffaloes (4–2) – Game summary

Quarter	1	2	3	4	OT	2OT	Total
Cardinal	0	0	19	17	7	3	46
Buffaloes	14	15	0	7	7	0	43

at Folsom Field • Boulder, CO

- Date: October 13, 2023
- Game time: 6:00 p.m. MST
- Game weather: Clear, 44 °F (7 °C)
- Game attendance: 53,154
- Referee: Justin Elliott
- TV announcers (ESPN): Mark Jones (play-by-play), Louis Riddick (analyst), Quint Kessenich (sideline)

Game information

First quarter

- (10:25) COL - Xavier Weaver 9-yard pass from Shedeur Sanders, Alejandro Mata kick (Drive: 9 plays, 85 yards, 3:13; Colorado 7-0)
- (3:36) COL - Travis Hunter 24-yard pass from Shedeur Sanders, Alejandro Mata kick (Drive: 9 plays, 85 yards, 3:13; Colorado 14-0)

Second quarter

- (8:42) COL - Xavier Weaver 39-yard pass from Shedeur Sanders, Caleb Fauria run for two-point conversion (Drive: 7 plays, 80 yards, 2:48; Colorado 22-0)
- (2:57) COL - Xavier Weaver 14-yard run, Alejandro Mata Kick (Drive: 5 plays, 66 yards, 1:47; Colorado 29-0)

Third quarter

- (9:01) STAN - Bryce Farrell 2-yard run, two-point conversion failed (Drive: 7 plays, 43 yards, 3:08; Colorado 29-6)
- (6:18) STAN - Elic Ayomanor 97-yard pass from Ashton Daniels, two-point conversion failed (Drive: 1 play, 97 yards, 0:15; Colorado 29-12)
- (4:45) STAN - Elic Ayomanor 60-yard pass from Ashton Daniels, Joshua Karty kick (Drive: 2 plays, 60 yards, 0:21; Colorado: 29-19)

Fourth quarter

- (12:29) STAN - Justin Lamson 1-yard run, Joshua Karty kick (Drive: 8 plays, 33 yards, 3:34; Colorado 29-26)
- (11:18) COL - Travis Hunter 16-yard pass from Shedeur Sanders, Alejandro Mata kick (Drive: 4 plays, 75 yards, 1:32; Colorado 36-26)
- (5:06) STAN - Bryce Farrell 3-yard pass from Ashton Daniels, Joshua Karty kick (Drive: 13 plays, 80 yards, 6:12; Colorado 36-33)
- (0:00) STAN - Joshua Karty 46-yard field goal (Drive: 14 plays, 71 yards, 2:55; Tied 36-36)

First overtime

- COL - Javon Antonio 4-yard pass from Shedeur Sanders, Alejandro Mata kick (Drive: 5 plays, 25 yards; Colorado: 43-36)
- STAN - Elic Ayomanor 30-yard pass from Ashton Daniels, Joshua Karty kick (Drive: 1 play, 25 yards; Tied 43-43)

Second overtime

- STAN - Joshua Karty 31-yard field goal (Drive: 4 plays, 12 yards; Stanford 46-43)

Statistics	STAN	COL
First downs	29	33
Total yards	523	532
Rushes/yards	39-124	35-132
Passing yards	399	400
Passing: Comp–Att–Int	28-49-0	33-47-1
Time of possession	34:42	25:18

Team	Category	Player	Statistics
Stanford	Passing	Ashton Daniels	27/45, 396 yards, 4 TD
Stanford	Rushing	Ashton Daniels	16 carries, 39 yards
Stanford	Receiving	Elic Ayomanor	13 receptions, 294 yards, 3 TD
Colorado	Passing	Shedeur Sanders	33/47, 300 yards, 5 TD
Colorado	Rushing	Shedeur Sanders	13 carries, 37 yards
Colorado	Receiving	Travis Hunter	13 receptions, 140 yards, 2 TD

=== vs No. 25 UCLA ===
No. 25 UCLA Bruins (4–2) vs Stanford Cardinal (2–4) – Game summary

Quarter	1	2	3	4	Total
No. 25 Bruins	14	7	14	7	42
Cardinal	0	0	7	0	7

at Stanford Stadium • Stanford, CA

- Date: October 21, 2023
- Game time: 7:30 p.m.
- Game weather: Sunny, 0 °F (−18 °C)
- Game attendance: 30,225
- Referee: Chris Wiggins
- TV announcers (ESPN): Dave Flemming (play-by-play), Brock Osweiler (analyst), Kayla Burton (sideline)

Game information

First quarter

- (10:27) UCLA - Carson Steele 2-yard run, RJ Lopez kick (Drive: 11 plays, 75 yards, 4:33; UCLA 7-0)
- (7:15) UCLA - Carson Steele 8-yard run, RJ Lopez kick (Drive: 3 plays, 60 yards, 0:55; UCLA 14-0)

Second quarter

- (5:27) UCLA - Carson Steele 3-yard run, RJ Lopez kick (Drive: 15 plays, 97 yards, 6:43; UCLA 21-0)

Third quarter

- (6:47) UCLA - J. Michael Sturdivant 8-yard pass from Ethan Garbers, RJ Lopez kick (Drive: 8 plays, 40 yards, 3:11; UCLA 28-0)
- (4:56) UCLA - Moliki Matavao 20-yard pass from Ethan Garbers, RJ Lopez kick (Drive: 2 plays, 29 yards, 0:57; UCLA 35-0)
- (3:11) STAN - Tiger Bachmeier 20-yard pass from Ashton Daniels, Joshua Karty kick (Drive: 6 plays, 75 yards, 1:45; UCLA 35-7)

Fourth quarter

- (14:28) UCLA - TJ Harden 22-yard run, RJ Lopez kick (Drive: 5 plays, 60 yards, 0:39; UCLA 42-7)

Statistics	UCLA	STAN
First downs	32	15
Total yards	503	292
Rushes/yards	221	24
Passing yards	282	268
Passing: Comp–Att–Int	25–34–0	27–45–1
Time of possession	36:56	23:04

Team	Category	Player	Statistics
UCLA	Passing	Ethan Garbers	20–28, 240 yards, 2 TD
UCLA	Rushing	Carson Steele	20 carries, 76 yards, 3 TD
UCLA	Receiving	J. Michael Sturdivant	5 receptions, 54 yards, 1 TD
Stanford	Passing	Ashton Daniels	27–45, 368 yards, TD, INT
Stanford	Rushing	Sedrick Irvin	3 carries, 16 yards
Stanford	Receiving	Elic Ayomanor	8 receptions, 90 yards

=== vs No. 5 Washington ===
No. 5 Washington Huskies (7–0) vs Stanford Cardinal (2–5) – Game summary

Quarter	1	2	3	4	Total
No. 5 Huskies	7	14	7	14	42
Cardinal	0	13	13	7	33

at Stanford Stadium • Stanford, CA

- Date: October 28, 2023
- Game time: 4:00 p.m.
- Game weather: 0 °F (−18 °C)
- Game attendance: 24,381
- Referee: Cravonne Barrett
- TV announcers (FS1): Tim Brando (play-by-play), Spencer Tillman (analyst)

Game information

First quarter

- (6:26) WASH - Jack Westover 1-yard run, Grady Gross kick (Drive: 6 plays, 50 yards, 2:41; WASH 7-0)

Second quarter

- (12:24) STAN - Ashton Daniels 5-yard run, Joshua Karty kick (Drive: 8 plays, 74 yards, 2:55; TIE 7-7)
- (9:20) WASH - Rome Odunze 7-yard pass from Michael Penix Jr., Grady Gross kick (Drive: 9 plays, 75 yards, 3:04; WASH 14-7)
- (5:09) WASH - Ja'Lynn Polk 92-yard pass from Michael Penix Jr., Grady Gross kick (Drive: 1 play, 92 yards, 0:14; WASH 21-7)
- (1:05) STAN - Joshua Karty 23-yard field goal (Drive: 9 plays, 70 yards, 4:04; WASH 21-10)
- (0:00) STAN - Joshua Karty 47-yard field goal (Drive: 8 plays, 38 yards, 0:41; WASH 21-13)

Third quarter

- (10:01) STAN - Elic Ayomanor 39-yard pass from Ashton Daniels, two-point conversion failed (Drive: 3 plays, 68 yards, 1:16; WASH 21-19)
- (3:55) WASH - Ja'Lynn Polk 10-yard pass from Michael Penix Jr., Grady Gross kick (Drive: 6 plays, 52 yards, 1:28; WASH 28-19)
- (1:17) STAN - Ashton Daniels 2-yard run, Joshua Karty kick (Drive: 6 plays, 75 yards, 2:38; WASH 28-26)

Fourth quarter

- (14:14) WASH - Devin Culp 24-yard pass from Michael Penix Jr., Grady Gross kick (Drive: 7 plays, 79 yards, 1:58; WASH 35-26)
- (6:46) STAN - Justin Lemon 2-yard run, Joshua Karty kick (Drive: 8 plays, 83 yards, 4:51; WASH 35-33)
- (1:36) WASH - Dillon Johnson 13-yard run, Grady Gross kick (Drive: 4 plays, 28 yards, 1:44; WASH 42-33)

Statistics	WASH	STAN
First downs	23	26
Total yards	460	495
Rushes/yards	91	128
Passing yards	369	367
Passing: Comp–Att–Int	21–37–1	31–49–0
Time of possession	25:20	34:40

Team	Category	Player	Statistics
Washington	Passing	Michael Penix Jr.	21–37, 369 yards, 4 TD, INT
Washington	Rushing	Dillon Johnson	18 carries, 84 yards, TD
Washington	Receiving	Ja'Lynn Polk	5 receptions, 148 yards, 2 TD
Stanford	Passing	Ashton Daniels	31–48, 367 yards, TD
Stanford	Rushing	Ashton Daniels	18 carries, 81 yards, TD
Stanford	Receiving	Elic Ayomanor	9 receptions, 146 yards, TD

=== at Washington State ===
Stanford Cardinal (2–6) at Washington State Cougars (4–4) – Game summary

Quarter	1	2	3	4	Total
Cardinal	0	0	7	3	10
Cougars	0	7	0	0	7

at Martin Stadium • Pullman, WA

- Date: November 4, 2023
- Game time: 6:00 p.m.
- Game weather: 0 °F (−18 °C)
- Game attendance: 24,385
- Referee: Jeff Dahle
- TV announcers (P12N): Roxy Bernstein, Michael Bumpus

Game information

First quarter

No scoring

Second quarter

- (6:18) WSU - Josh Kelly 9-yard pass from Cameron Ward, Dean Janikowski kick (Drive: 9 plays, 80 yards, 3:53; WSU 7-0)

Third quarter

- (2:55) STAN - Justin Lamson 1-yard run, Joshua Karty kick (Drive: 9 plays, 80 yards, 3:25; Tied 7-7)

Fourth quarter

- (5:56) STAN - Joshu Karty 31-yard field goal (Drive: 12 plays, 61 yards, 6:00; STAN 10-7)

Statistics	STAN	WSU
First downs	18	16
Total yards	217	245
Rushes/yards	38–75	24–4
Passing yards	142	241
Passing: Comp–Att–Int	16–32–1	24–40–1
Time of possession	34:25	25:35

Team	Category	Player	Statistics
Stanford	Passing	Ashton Daniels	15–31, 115 yards, INT
Stanford	Rushing	Justin Lamson	20 carries, 54 yards, TD
Stanford	Receiving	Sam Roush	7 receptions, 61 yards
Washington State	Passing	Cam Ward	24–40, 241 yards, TD, INT
Washington State	Rushing	Djouvensky Schlenbaker	13 carries, 34 yards
Washington State	Receiving	Josh Kelly	4 receptions, 82 yards, TD

=== at No. 12 Oregon State ===
Stanford Cardinal (3–6) at No. 12 Oregon State Beavers (7–2) – Game summary

Quarter	1	2	3	4	Total
Cardinal	7	3	7	0	17
No. 12 Beavers	14	20	21	7	62

at Reser Stadium • Corvallis, OR

- Date: November 11, 2023
- Game time: 2:30 p.m.
- Game weather: 56 °F (13 °C)
- Game attendance: 37,107
- Referee: John Love
- TV announcers (P12N): Ted Robinson (play-by-play), Yogi Roth (analyst)

Game information

First quarter

- (9:52) OSU - Damien Martinez 7-yard run, Atticus Sappington kick (Drive: 5 plays, 58 yards, 2:37; OSU 7-0)
- (5:33) OSU - Damien Martinez 59-yard run, Atticus Sappington kick (Drive: 6 plays, 70 yards, 2:20; OSU 14-0)
- (0:23) STAN - Ashton Daniels 7-yard run, Joshua Karty kick (Drive: 3 plays, 35 yards, 1:11; OSU 14-7)

Second quarter

- (13:44) OSU - Damien Martinez 15-yard run, Atticus Sappington kick (Drive: 5 plays, 85 yards, 1:35; OSU 21-7)
- (10:17) OSU - Jermaine Terry II 40-yard pass from DJ Uiagalelei, Atticus Sappington kick (Drive: 2 plays, 53 yards, 0:50; OSU 28-7)
- (3:04) STAN - Joshua Karty 28-yard field goal (Drive: 14 plays, 65 yards, 7:13; OSU 28-10)
- (0:15) OSU - Damien Martinez 5-yard run, extra point missed (Drive: 10 plays, 75 yards, 2:49; OSU 34-10)

Third quarter

- (8:09) OSU - Deshaun Fenwick 13-yard pass from DJ Uiagalelei, Atticus Sappington kick (Drive: 12 plays, 75 yards, 6:51; OSU 41-10)
- (3:48) OSU - Aidan Chiles 1-yard run, Atticus Sappington kick (Drive: 5 plays, 34 yards, 1:52; OSU 48-10)
- (1:43) OSU - Deshaun Fenwick 37-yard run, Atticus Sappington kick (Drive: 3 plays, 58 yards, 1:27; OSU 55-10)
- (1:30) STAN - Elic Ayomanor 75-yard pass from Ashton Daniels, Joshua Karty kick (Drive: 1 play, 75 yards, 0:13; OSU 55-17)

Fourth quarter

- (5:54) OSU - Riley Sharp 28-yard pass from Aidan Chiles, Atticus Sappington kick (Drive: 4 plays, 74 yards, 1:58; OSU 62-17)

Statistics	STAN	OSU
First downs	18	29
Total yards	324	598
Rushes/yards	32–127	40–277
Passing yards	242	321
Passing: Comp–Att–Int	14-32-4	18-28-0
Time of possession	29:13	30:47

Team	Category	Player	Statistics
Stanford	Passing	Ashton Daniels	10/16, 200 yards, TD, 3 INT
Stanford	Rushing	Ashton Daniels	9 carries, 65 yards, TD
Stanford	Receiving	Elic Ayomanor	3 receptions, 122 yards, TD
Oregon State	Passing	DJ Uiagalelei	12/19, 240 yards, 2 TD
Oregon State	Rushing	Damien Martinez	15 rushes, 149 yards, 4 TD
Oregon State	Receiving	Anthony Gould	1 reception, 61 yards

=== vs California ===
California Golden Bears (4–6) vs Stanford Cardinal (3–7) – Game summary

Quarter	1	2	3	4	Total
Golden Bears	7	7	7	6	27
Cardinal	3	3	9	0	15

at Stanford Stadium • Stanford, CA

- Date: November 18, 2023
- Game time: 3:30 p.m.
- Game weather: Cloudy, SW 9 mph
- Game attendance: 52,971
- Referee: Matthew Richards
- TV announcers (P12N): Roxy Bernstein, Lincoln Kennedy

Game information

First quarter

- (5:03) CAL – Trond Grizzell 9-yard pass from Fernando Mendoza, Mateen Bhaghani kick (Drive: 7 plays, 88 yards, 2:32; California 7–0)
- (0:22) STAN – Joshua Karty 44-yard field goal (Drive: 12 plays, 49 yards, 4:41; California 7–3)

Second quarter

- (13:13) CAL – Trond Grizzell 54-yard pass from Fernando Mendoza, Mateen Bhaghani kick (Drive: 5 plays, 75 yards, 2:09; California 14–3)
- (0:54) STAN – Joshua Karty 53-yard field goal (Drive: 10 plays, 27 yards, 3:47; California 14–6)

Third quarter

- (5:45) CAL – Jaydn Ott 1-yard run, Mateen Bhaghani kick (Drive: 12 plays, 67 yards, 5:30; California 21–6)
- (4:25) STAN – Tiger Bachmeier 41-yard pass from Ashton Daniels (Drive: 3 plays, 75 yards, 1:20; California 21–12)
- (0:46) STAN – Joshua Karty 50-yard field goal (Drive: 7 plays, 27 yards, 2:03; California 21–15)

Fourth quarter

- (10:19) CAL – Jeremiah Hunter 8-yard pass from Fernando Mendoza (Drive: 13 plays, 75 yards, 5:27; California 27–15)

Statistics	CAL	STAN
First downs	29	12
Total yards	455	289
Rushes/yards	47–161	24–101
Passing yards	294	188
Passing: Comp–Att–Int	24–37–1	18–35–0
Time of possession	35:36	24:24

Team	Category	Player	Statistics
California	Passing	Fernando Mendoza	24/36, 294 yards, 3 TD, INT
California	Rushing	Jaydn Ott	36 carries, 166 yards, TD
California	Receiving	Trond Grizzell	7 receptions, 136 yards, 2 TD
Stanford	Passing	Ashton Daniels	18/35, 188 yards, TD
Stanford	Rushing	Ashton Daniels	12 carries, 67 yards
Stanford	Receiving	Sam Roush	4 receptions, 62 yards

=== vs No. 18 Notre Dame ===
No. 18 Notre Dame Fighting Irish (8–3) vs Stanford Cardinal (3–8) – Game summary

Quarter	1	2	3	4	Total
No. 18 Fighting Irish	7	21	21	7	56
Cardinal	13	3	0	7	23

at Stanford Stadium • Stanford, CA

- Date: November 25, 2023
- Game time: 3:00 p.m.
- Game weather: Sunny, 75 °F (24 °C)
- Game attendance: 30,901
- Referee: Michael Roche
- TV announcers (P12N): Ted Robinson (play-by-play) and Yogi Roth (analyst)

Game information

First quarter

- (10:59) STAN – Joshua Karty 34-yard field goal (Drive: 7 plays, 59 yards, 4:01; Stanford 3–0)
- (5:37) ND – Audric Estimé 39-yard run, Spencer Shrader kick (Drive: 4 plays, 78 yards, 1:45; Notre Dame 7–3)
- (2:23) STAN – Joshua Karty 23-yard field goal (Drive: 8 plays, 70 yards, 3:14; Notre Dame 7–6)
- (1:31) STAN – Tiger Bachmeier 14-yard run, Joshua Karty kick (Drive: 2 plays, 30 yards 0:37; Stanford 13–7)

Second quarter

- (11:56) ND – Jaden Greathouse 15-yard pass from Sam Hartman, Spencer Shrader kick (Drive: 10 plays, 75 yards, 4:35; Notre Dame 14–13)
- (8:57) STAN – Joshua Karty 56-yard field goal (Drive: 4 plays, 0 yards, 0:25; Stanford 16–14)
- (3:53) ND – Audric Estimé 6-yard run, Spencer Shrader kick (Drive: 10 plays, 75 yards, 5:04; Notre Dame 21–16)
- (0:19) ND – Gi'Bran Payne 3-yard run, Spencer Shrader kick (Drive: 9 plays, 56 yards, 1:06; Notre Dame 28–16)

Third quarter

- (10:25) ND – Audric Estimé 5-yard run, Spencer Shrader kick (Drive: 10 plays, 75 yards, 4:35; Notre Dame 35–16)
- (6:08) ND – Jordan Faison 45-yard pass from Sam Hartman, Spencer Shrader kick (Drive: 1 play, 45 yards, 0:09; Notre Dame 42–16)
- (1:12) ND – Audric Estimé 25-yard run, Spencer Shrader kick (Drive: 5 plays, 45 yards, 2:29; Notre Dame 49–16)

Fourth quarter

- (12:41) ND – Javontae Jean-Baptiste 60-yard return of blocked field goal, Spencer Shrader kick (Drive: 5 plays, 37 yards, 2:29; Notre Dame 56–16)
- (7:16) STAN – Justin Lamson 4-yard run, Emmett Kenney kick (Drive: 9 plays, 47 yards, 4:58; Notre Dame 56–23)

Statistics	ND	STAN
First downs	28	19
Total yards	521	359
Rushes/yards	48–381	31–143
Passing yards	140	216
Passing: Comp–Att–Int	8–15–2	21–42–1
Time of possession	27:13	32:47

Team	Category	Player	Statistics
Notre Dame	Passing	Sam Hartman	8/14, 140 yards, 2 TD, INT
Notre Dame	Rushing	Audric Estimé	25 carries, 238 yards, 4 TD
Notre Dame	Receiving	Jordan Faison	3 receptions, 66 yards, TD
Stanford	Passing	Ashton Daniels	15/25, 152 yards, INT
Stanford	Rushing	Justin Lamson	10 carries, 82 yards, TD
Stanford	Receiving	E. J. Smith	7 receptions, 116 yards

== Players drafted into the NFL ==
Round	Pick	Player	Position	NFL club
6	209	Joshua Karty	K	Los Angeles Rams
