= 2024 Stanford Cardinal football team =

American college football season

2024 Stanford Cardinal football
- Conference: Atlantic Coast Conference
- Record: 3–9 (2–6 ACC)
- Head coach: Troy Taylor (2nd season)
- Offensive scheme: West Coast
- Defensive coordinator: Bobby April (2nd season)
- Base defense: 2–4–5
- Home stadium: Stanford Stadium

Uniform

2024 Atlantic Coast Conference football standings
	Conf.			Overall
Team	W		L	W		L
No. 12 SMU y^	8	–	0	11	–	3
No. 14 Clemson y$^	7	–	1	10	–	4
No. 18 Miami (FL)	6	–	2	10	–	3
No. 20 Syracuse	5	–	3	10	–	3
Duke	5	–	3	9	–	4
Louisville	5	–	3	9	–	4
Georgia Tech	5	–	3	7	–	6
Boston College	4	–	4	7	–	6
Virginia Tech	4	–	4	6	–	7
Pittsburgh	3	–	5	7	–	6
NC State	3	–	5	6	–	7
North Carolina	3	–	5	6	–	7
Virginia	3	–	5	5	–	7
California	2	–	6	6	–	7
Wake Forest	2	–	6	4	–	8
Stanford	2	–	6	3	–	9
Florida State	1	–	7	2	–	10
Championship: Clemson 34, SMU 31
^ – College Football Playoff participant; $ – Conference champion; y – Championship game participant; Rankings from AP Poll

The 2024 Stanford Cardinal football team represented Stanford University in the Atlantic Coast Conference (ACC) during the 2024 NCAA Division I FBS football season. The Cardinal were led by Troy Taylor in his second and final year as the head coach. The Cardinal played home games at Stanford Stadium located in Stanford, California.

The 2024 season was Stanford's first in the ACC since moving from the Pac-12 Conference, after spending over a century in the conference and its predecessor. The season was also notable for being Stanford’s fourth consecutive 3–9 season.

Stanford fired Taylor on March 25, 2025, following an investigation into alleged bullying of members of the Stanford athletic department.

== Offseason ==
=== Team departures ===
2024 Stanford Offseason Departures
Name	Number	Pos.	Height, Weight	Year	Hometown	Notes
Joshua Karty	#43	K	6'2", 208	Senior	Burlington NC	Graduated/Entered 2024 NFL draft
Benjamin Yurosek	#84	TE	6'6", 220	Senior	Bakersfield, CA	Transferred to Georgia
James Pogorelc	#74	OL	6'8", 302	Senior	Centreville, VA	Transferred to Duke
Jaxson Moi	#51	DL	6'2", 303	Sophomore	Oceanside, CA	Transferred to Tennessee
Alaka'i Gilman	#33	S	5'10", 194	Senior	Laie, HI	Transferred to Utah
E. J. Smith	#22	RB	6'0", 210	Senior	Dallas, TX	Transferred to Texas A&M
Ari Patu	#11	QB	6'4", 216	Junior	Folsom, CA	Transferred to North Alabama
Terian Williams II	#29	CB	5'8", 184	Sophomore	Duluth, GA	Transferred to Bucknell
Jimmy Wyrick	#18	S	5'10", 183	Junior	Dallas, TX	Transferred to UTSA
Zephron Lester	#99	DL	5'11", 297	Senior	Far Rockaway, NY	Transferred to Maine
Lance Keneley	#92	LB	6'4", 250	Senior	Mission Viejo, CA	Transferred to Arizona
Aaron Armitage	#9	LB	6'5", 260	Junior	Ajax, Ontario, Canada	Entered the Transfer Portal
Spencer Jorgensen	#10	LB	6'3", 233	5th Year-Senior	Provo, UT	Graduated
Casey Filkins	#2	RB	5'11", 206	Senior	Lake Oswego, OR	Graduated
John Humphreys	#5	WR	6'5", 198	Senior	Newport Beach, CA	Graduated
Matthew Merritt	55	DL	6'1", 266	Senior	Fresno, CA	Graduated
Beau Nelson	#10	QB	6'2", 207	Senior	Boise, ID	Graduated
Silas Starr	#19	WR	6'2", 221	Senior	Portland, OR	Graduated
Logan Berzins	#77	OL	6'3", 295	Senior	San Diego, CA	Graduated
Kiersten Lee	#54	LB	6'2", 226	Senior	Marietta, GA	Graduated

=== Incoming transfers ===
2024 Stanford incoming transfers
Name	Number	Pos.	Height, Weight	Year	Hometown	Notes
Jaivion Green	#5	CB	6'3", 208	Junior	Houston TX	Transferred from Washington
Jahsiah Galvan	#43	LB	6'2", 225	RS-Sophomore	West Liberty IA	Transferred from Northern Iowa

=== Recruiting class ===
College recruiting
Name	Hometown	School	Height	Weight	Commit date
Benedict Umeh; DL	Toronto, ON, CN	Avon Old Farms	6 ft 5 in (1.96 m)	240 lb (110 kg)	Jul 8, 2023
Benedict Umeh; DL	Recruit ratings: Rivals: 247Sports: On3: ESPN: (84)				
Elijah Brown; QB	Huntington Beach, CA	Mater Dei High School	6 ft 2 in (1.88 m)	197 lb (89 kg)	Jun 18, 2023
Elijah Brown; QB	Recruit ratings: Rivals: 247Sports: On3: ESPN: (81)				
Dylan Stephenson; LB	Miami, FL	Christopher Columbus High School	6 ft 4 in (1.93 m)	235 lb (107 kg)	Jun 13, 2023
Dylan Stephenson; LB	Recruit ratings: Rivals: 247Sports: On3: ESPN: (82)				
Emmett Mosley V WR	Chicago, IL	Santa Margarita Catholic High School	6 ft 1 in (1.85 m)	195 lb (88 kg)	Jun 21, 2023
Emmett Mosley V WR	Recruit ratings: Rivals: 247Sports: On3: ESPN: (79)				
Sam Mattingly; LB	Magnolia, TX	Magnolia West High School	6 ft 2 in (1.88 m)	225 lb (102 kg)	Jun 13, 2023
Sam Mattingly; LB	Recruit ratings: Rivals: 247Sports: On3: ESPN: (77)				
Cam Richardson; S	Irvington, NJ	Irvington High School	6 ft 1 in (1.85 m)	175 lb (79 kg)	Jun 22, 2023
Cam Richardson; S	Recruit ratings: Rivals: 247Sports: On3: ESPN: (78)				
Charlie Hoitink; OL	Slinger, WI	Slinger High School	6 ft 4 in (1.93 m)	305 lb (138 kg)	Mar 16, 2023
Charlie Hoitink; OL	Recruit ratings: Rivals: 247Sports: On3: ESPN: (78)				
Maxwell Richardson; LB	Ada, MI	Forest Hills Central High School	6 ft 3 in (1.91 m)	210 lb (95 kg)	Jun 23, 2023
Maxwell Richardson; LB	Recruit ratings: Rivals: 247Sports: On3: ESPN: (77)				
Chris Davis Jr. RB	Picayune, MS	Picayune Memorial High School	6 ft 0 in (1.83 m)	182 lb (83 kg)	Jun 18, 2023
Chris Davis Jr. RB	Recruit ratings: Rivals: 247Sports: On3: ESPN: (80)				
Cole Tabb; RB	Fort Walton Beach, FL	Choctawhatchee High School	5 ft 8 in (1.73 m)	190 lb (86 kg)	Jun 7, 2023
Cole Tabb; RB	Recruit ratings: Rivals: 247Sports: On3: ESPN: (80)				
Ziron Brown; OL	Waveland, MS	Bay High School	6 ft 4 in (1.93 m)	295 lb (134 kg)	Jun 27, 2023
Ziron Brown; OL	Recruit ratings: Rivals: 247Sports: On3: ESPN: (78)				
Benjamin Blackburn; TE	Miami, FL	Christopher Columbus High School	6 ft 6 in (1.98 m)	230 lb (100 kg)	Oct 5, 2023
Benjamin Blackburn; TE	Recruit ratings: Rivals: 247Sports: On3: ESPN: (79)				
Micah Ford; RB/QB	Toms River, NJ	Toms River High School North	5 ft 11 in (1.80 m)	205 lb (93 kg)	Apr 25, 2023
Micah Ford; RB/QB	Recruit ratings: Rivals: 247Sports: On3: ESPN: (77)				
Brandon Nicholson; CB	Memphis, TN	Memphis University School	6 ft 0 in (1.83 m)	175 lb (79 kg)	Jun 9, 2023
Brandon Nicholson; CB	Recruit ratings: Rivals: 247Sports: On3: ESPN: (79)				
Hayden Gunter; T	Denton, TX	Denton High School	6 ft 6 in (1.98 m)	255 lb (116 kg)	Jun 12, 2023
Hayden Gunter; T	Recruit ratings: Rivals: 247Sports: On3: ESPN: (75)				
Kahlil House; OL	Warner Robins, GA	Houston County High School	6 ft 4 in (1.93 m)	300 lb (140 kg)	Jun 30, 2023
Kahlil House; OL	Recruit ratings: Rivals: 247Sports: On3: ESPN: (80)				
Jacobi Murray; DL	Conyers, GA	Holy Innocents' Episcopal School	6 ft 0 in (1.83 m)	275 lb (125 kg)	Mar 26, 2023
Jacobi Murray; DL	Recruit ratings: Rivals: 247Sports: On3: ESPN: (78)				
Bo Tate; LB	Salt Lake City, UT	Corner Canyon High School	6 ft 1 in (1.85 m)	200 lb (91 kg)	Dec 4, 2023
Bo Tate; LB	Recruit ratings: Rivals: 247Sports: On3: ESPN: (77)				
Chase Farrell; WR	Thousand Oaks, CA	Oaks Christian School	5 ft 10 in (1.78 m)	165 lb (75 kg)	Mar 22, 2023
Chase Farrell; WR	Recruit ratings: Rivals: 247Sports: On3: ESPN: (80)				
Aiden Black; TE	Dingmans Ferry, PA	Delaware Valley High School	6 ft 2 in (1.88 m)	225 lb (102 kg)	Jun 5, 2023
Aiden Black; TE	Recruit ratings: Rivals: 247Sports: On3: ESPN: (75)				
Darrius Davis; S	Metairie, LA	Archbishop Rummel High School	6 ft 0 in (1.83 m)	190 lb (86 kg)	Jun 12, 2023
Darrius Davis; S	Recruit ratings: Rivals: 247Sports: On3: ESPN: (75)				
Jaylen'Dai Sumlin; S	Castaic, CA	Sierra Canyon High School	6 ft 3 in (1.91 m)	185 lb (84 kg)	Jun 6, 2023
Jaylen'Dai Sumlin; S	Recruit ratings: Rivals: 247Sports: On3: ESPN: (75)				
Connor Bachhuber; DL	San Clemente, CA	San Clemente High School	6 ft 5 in (1.96 m)	245 lb (111 kg)	May 2, 2023
Connor Bachhuber; DL	Recruit ratings: Rivals: 247Sports: On3: ESPN: (75)				
Joe Asiain; DL	Edison, NJ	St. Peter's Preparatory School	6 ft 3 in (1.91 m)	280 lb (130 kg)	Jun 8, 2023
Joe Asiain; DL	Recruit ratings: Rivals: 247Sports: On3: ESPN: (77)				
Javion Randall; CB	Richmond, VA	Henrico High School	5 ft 11 in (1.80 m)	175 lb (79 kg)	Dec 5, 2023
Javion Randall; CB	Recruit ratings: Rivals: 247Sports: On3:				
Overall recruit ranking: Rivals: 27 247Sports: 43 On3: 38 ESPN: 31
‡ Refers to 40-yard dash; Note: In many cases, Scout, Rivals, 247Sports, On3, and ESPN may conflict in their listings of height, weight and 40 time.; In these cases, the average was taken. ESPN grades are on a 100-point scale.; Sources: "2024 Team Ranking". Rivals.com.

== Schedule ==
Date	Time	Opponent	Site	TV	Result	Attendance
August 30	7:30 p.m.	TCU*	Stanford Stadium; Stanford, CA	ESPN	L 27–34	36,026
September 7	4:00 p.m.	Cal Poly*	Stanford Stadium; Stanford, CA	ACCNX/ESPN+	W 41–7	22,634
September 20	4:30 p.m.	at Syracuse	JMA Wireless Dome; Syracuse, NY	ESPN	W 26–24	39,290
September 28	4:00 p.m.	at No. 17 Clemson	Memorial Stadium; Clemson, SC	ESPN	L 14–40	80,295
October 5	12:30 p.m.	Virginia Tech	Stanford Stadium; Stanford, CA	ACCN	L 7–31	36,277
October 12	12:30 p.m.	at No. T–11 Notre Dame*	Notre Dame Stadium; Notre Dame, IN (rivalry)	NBC/CNBC (Note: Game was moved to CNBC due to overrun into Big Ten Saturday Night after it was delayed due to lightning in the area.)	L 7–49	77,622
October 19	5:00 p.m.	No. 21 SMU	Stanford Stadium; Stanford, CA	ACCN	L 10–40	19,117
October 26	12:30 p.m.	Wake Forest^{†}	Stanford Stadium; Stanford, CA	ACCN	L 24–27	23,471
November 2	9:00 a.m.	at NC State	Carter–Finley Stadium; Raleigh, NC	ACCN	L 28–59	56,919
November 16	12:30 p.m.	No. 19 Louisville	Stanford Stadium; Stanford, CA	ACCN	W 38–35	18,685
November 23	12:30 p.m.	at California	California Memorial Stadium; Berkeley, CA (Big Game)	ACCN	L 21–24	52,428
November 29	1:00 p.m.	at San Jose State*	CEFCU Stadium; San Jose, CA (Bill Walsh Legacy Game)	CBS	L 31–34	19,117
*Non-conference game; ^{†}Homecoming; Rankings from AP Poll (and CFP Rankings, after November 5) - Released prior to game; All times are in Pacific time

== Game summaries ==
=== vs. TCU ===
Game One – TCU Horned Frogs (0–0) at Stanford Cardinal (0–0) – Game summary

Quarter	1	2	3	4	Total
Horned Frogs	7	3	10	14	34
Cardinal	7	10	0	10	27

at Stanford Stadium • Stanford, CA

- Date: August 30, 2024
- Game time: 9:30 p.m. CST
- Game weather: Sunny, 69 °F (21 °C)
- Game attendance: 36,026
- Referee: Jerry Magallanes
- TV announcers (ESPN): Dave Flemming (play-by-play), Brock Osweiler (analyst), and Stormy Buoanantony (sideline)

Game information

First quarter

- (7:57) STAN – Jackson Harris 3-yard pass from Ashton Daniels, Emmet Kenney kick (Drive: 13 plays, 89 yards, 6:59; Stanford 7-0)
- (1:16) TCU – Savion Williams 5-yard pass from Josh Hoover, Kyle Lemmermann kick (Drive: 13 plays, 75 yards, 6:41; Tied 7-7)

Second quarter

- (9:09) STAN – Ismael Cisse 2-yard pass from Justin Lamson, Emmet Kenney kick (Drive: 7 plays, 20 yards, 3:07; Stanford 14-7)
- (4:09) TCU – Kyle Lemmermann 22-yard field goal (Drive: 5 plays, 18 yards, 1:22; Stanford 14-10)
- (1:36) STAN – Emmet Kenney 35-yard field goal (Drive: 8 plays, 58 yards, 2:33; Stanford 17-10)

Third quarter

- (9:11) TCU – Kyle Lemmermann 42-yard field goal (Drive: 14 plays, 57 yards, 5:43; Stanford 17-13)
- (2:22) TCU – Josh Hoover 1-yard run, Kyle Lemmermann kick (Drive: 4 plays, 42 yards, 2:22; TCU 20-17)

Fourth quarter

- (6:57) STAN – Justin Lamson 1-yard run, Emmet Kenney kick (Drive: 11 plays, 79 yards, 4:46; Stanford 24-20)
- (3:13) TCU – Jack Bech 4-yard pass from Josh Hoover, Kyle Lemmermann kick (Drive: 8 plays, 74 yards, 3:39; TCU 27-24)
- (1:51) TCU – Cam Cook 7-yard run, Kyle Lemmermann kick (Drive: 4 plays, 19 yards, 0:23; TCU 34-24)
- (0:36) STAN – Emmet Kenney 45-yard field goal (Drive: 8 plays, 48 yards, 1:15; TCU 34-27)

Statistics	TCU	STAN
First downs	24	17
Total yards	457	286
Rushing yards	104	121
Passing yards	353	165
Passing: Comp–Att–Int	28–42–0	17–35–1
Time of possession	30:15	29:45

Team	Category	Player	Statistics
TCU	Passing	Josh Hoover	28-42, 353 yards, 2 TD
TCU	Rushing	Cam Cook	20 car, 81 yards, 1 TD
TCU	Receiving	Jack Bech	6 rec, 139 yards, 1 TD
Stanford	Passing	Ashton Daniels	17-35, 163 yards, 1 TD, 1 INT
Stanford	Rushing	Ashton Daniels	17 car, 87 yards
Stanford	Receiving	Elic Ayomanor	7 rec, 102 yards

=== vs. Cal Poly (FCS) ===
Game Two – Cal Poly Mustangs (FCS) (0–1) at Stanford Cardinal (0–1) – Game summary

Quarter	1	2	3	4	Total
Mustangs (FCS)	0	7	0	0	7
Cardinal	7	7	17	10	41

at Stanford Stadium, Stanford, California

- Date: Saturday September 7, 2024
- Game time: 4:00 p.m. PST
- Game weather: Sunny
- Game attendance: 22,634
- Referee: Nate Black
- TV announcers (ACCNX/ESPN+): Roxy Bernstein (play-by-play), Michael Bumpus (analyst), and Sherree Burruss (sideline)

Game information

First quarter

- (0:00) STAN – Mudia Reuben 5-yard pass from Ashton Daniels, Emmet Kenney kick (Drive: 8 plays, 78 yards, 5:03; Stanford 7–0)

Second quarter

- (12:09) CP – Jake Woods 22-yard pass from Michael Briscoe, Gianluca Dimauro kick (Drive: 6 plays, 75 yards, 2:51; Tied 7–7)
- (0:21) STAN – Justin Lamson 2-yard run, Emmet Kenney kick (Drive: 6 plays, 73 yards, 1:11; Stanford 14–7)

Third quarter

- (11:52) STAN – Tiger Bachmeier 90-yard punt return, Emmet Kenney kick (Stanford 21–7)
- (5:26) STAN – Emmet Kenney 32-yard field goal (Drive: 9 plays, 46 yards, 4:17; Stanford 24–7)
- (2:02) STAN – Sam Roush 5-yard pass from Ashton Daniels, Emmet Kenney kick (Drive: 5 plays, 21 yards, 2:47; Stanford 31–7)

Fourth quarter

- (10:02) STAN – Ismael Cisse 12-yard pass from Elijah Brown, Emmet Kenney kick (Drive: 7 plays, 85 yards, 4:08; Stanford 31–7)
- (1:55) STAN – Emmet Kenney 43-yard field goal (Drive: 8 plays, 60 yards, 4:18; Stanford 41–7)

Statistics	CP	STAN
First downs	13	22
Total yards	229	437
Rushing yards	25	119
Passing yards	204	318
Turnovers	1	1
Time of possession	25:37	34:23

Team	Category	Player	Statistics
Cal Poly	Passing	Bo Kelly	17/25, 149 yards, INT
Cal Poly	Rushing	Aiden Ramos	8 carries, 22 yards
Cal Poly	Receiving	Michael Briscoe	3 receptions, 47 yards
Stanford	Passing	Ashton Daniels	19/23, 221 yards, 2 TD
Stanford	Rushing	Chris Davis Jr.	6 carries, 53 yards
Stanford	Receiving	Sedrick Irvin	2 receptions, 92 yards

=== at Syracuse ===
Game Three – Stanford Cardinal (1–1) vs. Syracuse Orange (2–0) − Game summary

Quarter	1	2	3	4	Total
Cardinal	7	6	7	6	26
Orange	0	10	7	7	24

at JMA Wireless Dome • Syracuse, New York

- Date: Friday September 20, 2024
- Game time: 4:30 p.m. PST
- Game weather: None (played indoors)
- Game attendance: 39,290
- Referee: Tim Hedgepeth
- TV announcers (ESPN): Anish Shroff (play-by-play), Andre Ware (analyst), and Paul Carcaterra (sideline)

Game information

First quarter

- (7:22) STAN – Elic Ayomanor 17-yard pass from Ashton Daniels, Emmet Kenney kick (Drive: 9 plays, 78 yards, 4:07; Stanford 7-0)

Second quarter

- (14:03) STAN – Emmet Kenney 38-yard field goal (Drive: 11 plays, 51 yards, 5:39; Stanford 10-0)
- (9:26) SYR – Brady Denaburg 30-yard field goal (Drive: 5 plays, 11 yards, 1:37; Stanford 10-3)
- (1:35) STAN – Emmet Kenney 51-yard field goal (Drive: 5 plays, 47 yards, 1:00; Stanford 13-3)
- (0:28) SYR – Umari Hatcher 67-yard pass from Kyle McCord, Brady Denaburg kick (Drive: 3 plays, 75 yards, 1:07; Stanford 13-10)

Third quarter

- (4:16) STAN – Mitch Leigber 71-yard interception, Emmet Kenney kick (Stanford 20-10)
- (0:07) SYR – Kyle McCord 19-yard run, Brady Denaburg kick (Drive: 9 plays, 75 yards, 4:09; Stanford 20-17)

Fourth quarter

- (9:19) STAN – Emmet Kenney 35-yard field goal (Drive: 9 plays, 30 yards, 4:39; Stanford 23-17)
- (3:13) SYR – Jackson Meeks 13-yard pass from Kyle McCord, Brady Denaburg kick (Drive: 7 plays, 60 yards, 3:27; Syracuse 24-23)
- (0:00) STAN – Emmet Kenney 39-yard field goal (Drive: 11 plays, 54 yards, 3:13; Stanford 26-24)

Statistics	STAN	SYR
First downs	21	18
Total yards	351	365
Rushing yards	173	26
Passing yards	178	339
Passing: Comp–Att–Int	23–38–2	27–42–2
Time of possession	31:40	27:16

Team	Category	Player	Statistics
Stanford	Passing	Ashton Daniels	23/38, 178 yards, TD, 2 INT
Stanford	Rushing	Chris Davis Jr.	9 carries, 79 yards
Stanford	Receiving	Elic Ayomanor	7 receptions, 87 yards, TD
Syracuse	Passing	Kyle McCord	27/42, 339 yards, 2 TD, 2 INT
Syracuse	Rushing	LeQuint Allen	8 carries, 25 yards
Syracuse	Receiving	Trebor Pena	10 receptions, 101 yards

=== at No. 17 Clemson ===
Game Four – Stanford Cardinal (2–1) vs. No. 17 Clemson Tigers (2–1) − Game summary

Quarter	1	2	3	4	Total
Cardinal	0	7	0	7	14
No. 17 Tigers	10	7	10	13	40

at Memorial Stadium • Clemson, South Carolina

- Date: Saturday September 28, 2024
- Game time: 4:00 p.m. PST
- Game weather: Temperature: 72 °F (22 °C) • Wind: SW 4 mph • Weather: Sunny
- Game attendance: 80,295
- Referee: Marcus Woods
- TV announcers (ESPN): Mark Jones (play-by-play), Roddy Jones (analyst), and Quint Kessenich (sideline)

Game information

First quarter

- (12:19) Clemson – Cade Klubnik 34-yard run, Nolan Hauser kick (Drive: 3 plays, 34 yards, 0:54; Clemson 7–0)
- (05:49) Clemson – Hauser 20-yard field goal (Drive: 5 plays, 77 yards, 2:09; Clemson 10–0)

Second quarter

- (01:49) Clemson – Jake Briningstool 3-yard pass from Klubnik, Hauser kick (Drive: 8 plays, 54 yards, 2:31; Clemson 17–0)
- (00:39) Stanford – Elic Ayomanor 19 yard pass from Ashton Daniels, Emmet Kenney kick (Drive: 7 plays, 75 yards, 1:10' Clemson 17–7)

Third quarter

- (10:06) Clemson – Hauser 33-yard field goal (Drive: 12 plays, 58 yards, 4:48; Clemson 20–7)
- (01:09) Clemson – Cole Turner 43 yard pass from Klubnik, Hauser kick (Drive: 2 plays, 43 yards, 0:47; Clemson 27–7)

Fourth quarter

- (14:10) Clemson – Bryant Wesco 34 yard pass from Klubnik, Hauser kick blocked (Drive: 1 play, 34 yards, 0:07; Clemson 33–7)
- (10:36) Clemson – Olsen Patt-Henry 2 yard pass from Klubnik, Hauser kick (Drive: 4 plays, 35 yards, 01:15; Clemson 40–7)
- (02:31) Stanford – Emmett Mosley V 22 yard pass from Justin Lamson, Kenney kick (Drive: 8 plays, 66 yards, 03:52; Clemson 40–14)

Statistics	STAN	CLEM
First downs	20	18
Total yards	361	405
Rushing yards	236	150
Passing yards	125	255
Passing: Comp–Att–Int	13–27–3	15–31–1
Time of possession	33:47	26:13

Team	Category	Player	Statistics
Stanford	Passing	Ashton Daniels	9/19, 71 yards, TD, 3 INT
Stanford	Rushing	Micah Ford	15 carries, 122 yards
Stanford	Receiving	Elic Ayomanor	4 receptions, 50 yards, TD
Clemson	Passing	Cade Klubnik	15/31, 255 yards, 4 TD, INT
Clemson	Rushing	Phil Mafah	10 carries, 58 yards
Clemson	Receiving	Bryant Wesco	2 receptions, 104 yards, TD

=== vs. Virginia Tech ===
Game Five – Virginia Tech Hokies (2–3) at Stanford Cardinal (2–2) – Game summary

Quarter	1	2	3	4	Total
Hokies	7	7	7	10	31
Cardinal	0	0	7	0	7

at Stanford Stadium • Stanford, California

- Date: October 5, 2024
- Game time: 12:30 p.m.
- Game weather: Sunny • Temperature: 89 °F (32 °C) • Wind: N 2 miles per hour (3.2 km/h)
- Game attendance: 36,277
- Referee: Gary Patterson
- TV announcers (ACCN): Chris Cotter (play-by-play), Mark Herzlich (analyst), and Coley Harvey (sideline)

Game information

First quarter

- (6:33) VT – Stephen Gosnell 9-yard pass from Kyron Drones, John Love kick (Drive: 7 plays, 65 yards, 2:53; Virginia Tech 7–0)

Second quarter

- (1:54) VT – Bhayshul Tuten 7-yard run, John Love kick (Drive: 13 plays, 88 yards, 6:45; Virginia Tech 14–0)

Third quarter

- (13:01) VT – Da'Quan Felton 55-yard pass from Kyron Drones, John Love kick (Drive: 4 plays, 75 yards, 1:59; Virginia Tech 21–0)
- (1:00) STAN – Elic Ayomanor 19-yard pass from Micah Ford, Emmet Kenney kick (Drive: 12 plays, 80 yards, 7:16; Virginia Tech 21–7)

Fourth quarter

- (7:28) VT – Kyron Drones 2-yard run, John Love kick (Drive: 7 plays, 35 yards, 3:28; Virginia Tech 28–7)
- (2:33) VT – John Love 46-yard field goal (Drive: 8 plays, 31 yards, 3:55; Virginia Tech 31–7)

Statistics	VT	STAN
First downs	16	18
Total yards	337	258
Rushing yards	136	136
Passing yards	201	122
Passing: Comp–Att–Int	14–19–0	14–25–1
Time of possession	26:52	33:08

Team	Category	Player	Statistics
Virginia Tech	Passing	Kyron Drones	14/19, 201 yards, 2 TD
Virginia Tech	Rushing	Bhayshul Tuten	21 carries, 73 yards, TD
Virginia Tech	Receiving	Da'Quan Felton	4 receptions, 84 yards, TD
Stanford	Passing	Justin Lamson	13/24, 103 yards, INT
Stanford	Rushing	Chris Davis Jr.	8 carries, 47 yards
Stanford	Receiving	Elic Ayomanor	8 receptions, 33 yards, TD

=== at No. 11т Notre Dame (rivalry) ===
Game Six – Stanford Cardinal (2–3) vs. No. 11т Notre Dame Fighting Irish (4–1) − Game summary

Quarter	1	2	3	4	Total
Cardinal	7	0	0	0	7
No. 11т Fighting Irish	7	14	21	7	49

at Notre Dame Stadium • Notre Dame, Indiana

- Date: Saturday October 12, 2024
- Game time: 12:30 p.m. PST
- Game weather: Temperature: 71 °F (22 °C) •Wind: SE 7 MPH • Weather: Cloudy
- Game attendance: 77,622
- Referee: Stuart Mullins
- TV announcers (NBC/CNBC): Dan Hicks (play-by-play), Jason Garrett (analyst), and Zora Stephenson (sideline)

Game information

First quarter

- (6:49) STAN – Justin Lamson 1-yard run, Emmett Kenny kick (Drive: 9 plays, 63 yards, 5:14; Stanford 7–0)
- (1:27) ND – Reily Leonard 6-yard run, Mitch Jeter kick (Drive: 12 plays, 75 yards, 5:22; Tied 7–7)

Second quarter

- (7:46) ND – Jayden Thomas 15-yard pass from Reily Leonard, Zac Yoakam kick (Drive: 7 plays, 52 yards, 3:20; Notre Dame 14–7)
- (1:11) ND – Kris Mitchell 5-yard pass from Reily Leonard, Zac Yoakam kick (Drive: 9 plays, 56 yards, 2:37; Notre Dame 21–7)

Third quarter

- (12:12) ND – Jadarian Price 16-yard run, Zac Yoakam kick (Drive: 2 plays, 17 yards, 0:40; Notre Dame 28–7)
- (6:49) ND – Jeremiyah Love 39-yard run, Zac Yoakam kick (Drive: 4 plays, 83 yards, 1:23; Notre Dame 35–7)
- (1:29) ND – Eli Raridon 5-yard pass from Reily Leonard, Zac Yoakam kick (Drive: 5 plays, 64 yards, 2:37; Notre Dame 42–7)

Fourth quarter

- (9:17) ND – Aneyas Williams 19-yard run, Zac Yoakam kick (Drive: 11 plays, 60 yards, 5:25; Notre Dame 49–7)

Statistics	STAN	ND
First downs	14	24
Total yards	59–200	66–477
Rushing yards	41–113	39–229
Passing yards	87	248
Passing: Comp–Att–Int	10–18–0	18–27–0
Time of possession	30:44	29:16

Team	Category	Player	Statistics
Stanford	Passing	Ashton Daniels	8/13, 74 yards
Stanford	Rushing	Chris Davis Jr.	10 carries, 45 yards
Stanford	Receiving	Ismael Cisse	2 receptions, 29 yards
Notre Dame	Passing	Riley Leonard	16/22, 229 yards, 3 TD
Notre Dame	Rushing	Jeremiyah Love	6 carries, 53 yards, TD
Notre Dame	Receiving	Beaux Collins	4 receptions, 85 yards

=== vs. No. 21 SMU ===
Game Seven – No. 21 SMU Mustangs (5–1) at Stanford Cardinal (2–4) – Game summary

Quarter	1	2	3	4	Total
No. 21 Mustangs	21	10	0	9	40
Cardinal	0	7	3	0	10

at Stanford Stadium, Stanford, California

- Date: Saturday October 19, 2024
- Game time: 5:00 p.m.
- Game weather: Sunny
- Game attendance: 19,117
- Referee: Tim Hedgepeth
- TV announcers (ACCN): Wes Durham (play-by-play), Tom Luginbill (analyst), and Dana Boyle (sideline)

Game information

First quarter

- SMU – Moochie Dixon 87-yard pass from Kevin Jennings (Collin Rogers kick), 14:41. Mustangs 7–0. Drive: 1 play, 87 yards, 0:14.
- SMU – Key'Shawn Smith 45-yard pass from Kevin Jennings (Collin Rogers kick), 4:31. Mustangs 14–0. Drive: 6 plays, 93 yards, 2:03.
- SMU – R. J. Maryland 38-yard pass from Kevin Jennings (Collin Rogers kick), 1:47. Mustangs 21–0. Drive: 2 plays, 55 yards, 0:33.

Second quarter

- STAN – Elic Ayomanor 18-yard pass from Elijah Brown (Emmett Kenney kick), 6:39. Mustangs 21–7. Drive: 3 plays, 14 yards, 1:53.
- SMU – L. J. Johnson Jr. 5-yard run (Collin Rogers kick), 1:51. Mustangs 28–7. Drive: 12 plays, 59 yards, 4:41.
- SMU – Collin Rogers 51-yard field goal, 0:00. Mustangs 31–7. Drive: 6 plays, 46 yards, 1:11.

Third quarter

- STAN – Emmett Kenney 42-yard field goal, 12:54. Mustangs 31–10. Drive: 4 plays, 5 yards, 0:38.

Fourth quarter

- SMU – Cole Sanders Jr. safety, 11:40. Mustangs 33–10.
- SMU – L. J. Johnson Jr. 2-yard run (Collin Rogers kick), 5:03. Mustangs 40–10. Drive: 13 plays, 63 yards, 6:29.

Statistics	SMU	STAN
First downs	22	15
Total yards	501	206
Rushing yards	179	33
Passing yards	322	173
Turnovers	3	2
Time of possession	27:15	32:45

Team	Category	Player	Statistics
SMU	Passing	Kevin Jennings	17/27, 322 yards, 3 TD, INT
SMU	Rushing	Brashard Smith	8 carries, 67 yards
SMU	Receiving	Moochie Dixon	1 reception, 87 yards, TD
Stanford	Passing	Elijah Brown	16/32, 153 yards, TD, 2 INT
Stanford	Rushing	Micah Ford	13 carries, 31 yards
Stanford	Receiving	Sam Roush	6 receptions, 75 yards

=== vs. Wake Forest ===
Game Eight – Wake Forest Demon Deacons (3–4) vs Stanford Cardinal (2–5) – Game summary

Quarter	1	2	3	4	Total
Demon Deacons	14	10	0	3	27
Cardinal	0	17	0	7	24

at Stanford Stadium • Stanford, California

- Date: Saturday October 26, 2024
- Game time: 12:30 p.m.
- Game weather: Sunny, 69 °F (21 °C)
- Game attendance: 23,471
- Referee: Justin Elliott
- TV announcers (ACCN): Jorge Sedano (play-by-play), Orlando Franklin (analyst) and Marilyn Payne (sideline)

Game information

First quarter

- (8:47) WAKE – Micah Mays Jr. 30-yard pass from Hank Bachmeier, Matthew Dennis kick (Drive: 2 plays, 35 yards, 0:29; Wake Forest 7–0)
- (0:49) WAKE – Tate Carney 39-yard pass from Hank Bachmeier, Matthew Dennis kick (Drive: 9 plays, 72 yards, 2:35; Wake Forest 14–0)

Second quarter

- (12:44) STAN – Justin Lamson 1-yard run, Emmet Kenney kick (Drive: 8 plays, 69 yards, 2:59; Wake Forest 14–7)
- (8:58) STAN – Tevarua Tafiti 44-yard fumble recovery, Emmet Kenney kick (Tied 14–14)
- (4:24) WAKE – Matthew Dennis 35-yard field goal (Drive: 10 plays, 58 yards, 4:34; Wake Forest 17–14)
- (1:55) WAKE – Taylor Morin 18-yard pass from Hank Bachmeier, Matthew Dennis kick (Drive: 5 plays, 36 yards, 2:22; Wake Forest 24–14)
- (0:01) STAN – Emmet Kenney 40-yard field goal (Drive: 11 plays, 53 yards, 1:54; Wake Forest 24–17)

Third quarter

No scoring plays

Fourth quarter

- (8:41) STAN – Sam Roush 16-yard pass from Ashton Daniels, Emmet Kenney kick (Drive: 15 plays, 99 yards, 7:48; Tied 24–24)
- (1:48) WAKE – Matthew Dennis 23-yard field goal (Drive: 10 plays, 45 yards, 3:27; Wake Forest 27–24)

Statistics	WAKE	STAN
First downs	23	23
Total yards	418	346
Rushing yards	173	108
Passing yards	245	238
Passing: Comp–Att–Int	20–30–1	29–40–3
Time of possession	32:42	27:18

Team	Category	Player	Statistics
Wake Forest	Passing	Hank Bachmeier	20/30, 245 yards, 3 TD, INT
Wake Forest	Rushing	Demond Claiborne	23 carries, 127 yards
Wake Forest	Receiving	Demond Claiborne	3 receptions, 62 yards
Stanford	Passing	Ashton Daniels	24/31, 214 yards, TD, 2 INT
Stanford	Rushing	Ashton Daniels	11 carries, 54 yards
Stanford	Receiving	Elic Ayomanor	11 receptions, 96 yards

=== at NC State ===
Game Nine – Stanford Cardinal (2–6) vs NC State Wolfpack (4–4) – Game summary

Quarter	1	2	3	4	Total
Cardinal	7	7	7	7	28
Wolfpack	14	14	21	7	56

at Carter–Finley Stadium • Raleigh, North Carolina

- Date: Saturday November 2, 2024
- Game time: 9:00 a.m.
- Game weather: Cloudy, 62 °F (17 °C)
- Game attendance: 56,919
- Referee: Riley Johnson
- TV announcers (ACCN): Jorge Sedano (play-by-play), Orlando Franklin (analyst) and Morgan Uber (sideline)

Game information

First quarter

- (9:29) NCST – Hollywood Smothers 2-yard run, Collin Smith kick (Drive: 9 plays, 55 yards, 5:24; NC State 7–0)
- (5:06) NCST – Jordan Waters 13-yard run, Collin Smith kick (Drive: 4 plays, 32 yards, 1:48; NC State 14–0)
- (2:56) STAN – Ashton Daniels 67-yard run, Emmet Kenney kick (Drive: 5 plays, 70 yards, 2:03; NC State 14–7)

Second quarter

- (14:15) NCST – Collin Smith 23-yard field goal (Drive: 6 plays, 65 yards, 3:35; NC State 17–7)
- (11:15) STAN – Justin Lamson 3-yard run, Emmet Kenney kick (Drive: 6 plays, 75 yards, 3:00; NC State 17–14)
- (5:15) NCST – Justin Joly 9-yard pass from CJ Bailey, Collin Smith kick (Drive: 11 plays, 75 yards, 6:00; NC State 24–14)
- (0:34) NCST – Keenan Jackson 8-yard pass from CJ Bailey, Collin Smith kick (Drive: 9 plays, 70 yards, 3:09; NC State 31–14)

Third quarter

- (11:22) STAN – Ashton Daniels 48-yard run, Emmet Kenney kick (Drive: 6 plays, 75 yards, 3:38; NC State 31–21)
- (11:04) NCST – KC Concepcion 9-yard run, Collin Smith kick (Drive: 1 play, 9 yards, 0:06; NC State 38–21)
- (7:12) NCST – Hollywood Smothers 52-yard run, Collin Smith kick (Drive: 2 plays, 53 yards, 0:55; NC State 45–21)
- (4:55) NCST – Jordan Waters 94-yard run, Collin Smith kick (Drive: 1 play, 94 yards, 0:14; NC State 52–21)

Fourth quarter

- (13:04) NCST – KC Concepcion 5-yard pass from CJ Bailey, Collin Smith kick (Drive: 8 plays, 58 yards, 5:02; NC State 59–21)
- (5:47) STAN – Elic Ayomanor 14-yard pass from Justin Lamson, Emmet Kenney kick (Drive: 4 plays, 40 yards, 1:59; NC State 59–28)

Statistics	STAN	NCST
First downs	16	25
Total yards	398	527
Rushing yards	225	281
Passing yards	173	246
Passing: Comp–Att–Int	9–16–1	19–22–1
Time of possession	26:19	33:41

Team	Category	Player	Statistics
Stanford	Passing	Justin Lamson	3/8, 103 yards, TD, INT
Stanford	Rushing	Ashton Daniels	11 carries, 129 yards, 2 TD
Stanford	Receiving	Elic Ayomanor	4 receptions, 108 yards, TD
NC State	Passing	CJ Bailey	18/20, 234 yards, 3 TD
NC State	Rushing	Jordan Waters	5 carries, 115 yards, 2 TD
NC State	Receiving	Justin Joly	4 receptions, 66 yards, TD

=== vs. No. 19 Louisville ===
Game Ten – No. 19 Louisville Cardinals (6–3) vs Stanford Cardinal (2–7) – Game summary

Quarter	1	2	3	4	Total
No. 19 Cardinals	7	14	7	7	35
Cardinal	10	3	8	17	38

at Stanford Stadium • Stanford, California

- Date: Saturday November 16, 2024
- Game time: 12:30 p.m.
- Game attendance: 18,865
- TV announcers (ACCN): Jorge Sedano (play-by-play), Orlando Franklin (analyst) and Morgan Uber (sideline)

Game information

First quarter

- (7:59) STAN – Emmet Kenney 41-yard field goal (Drive: 4 plays, 1 yard, 0:48; Stanford 3–0)
- (6:12) STAN – Emmett Mosely V 62-yard pass from Ashton Daniels (Emmet Kenney kick) (Drive: 1 play, 62 yards, 0:11; Stanford 10–0)
- (1:11) LOU – Donald Chaney 1-yard run (Brock Travelstead kick) (Drive: 6 plays, 43 yards, 2:32; Stanford 10–7)

Second quarter

- (6:56) STAN – Emmet Kenney 24-yard field goal (Drive: 15 plays, 74 yard, 9:11; Stanford 13–7)
- (4:06) LOU – Duke Watson 5-yard run (Brock Travelstead kick) (Drive: 7 plays, 65 yards, 2:50; Louisville 14–13)
- (0:49) LOU – Chris Bell 10-yard pass from Tyler Shough (Brock Travelstead kick) (Drive: 7 plays, 53 yards, 1:26; Louisville 21–13)

Third quarter

- (4:48) LOU – Duke Watson 68-yard run (Brock Travelstead kick) (Drive: 1 play, 68 yards, 0:11; Louisville 28–13)
- (0:07) STAN – Elic Ayomanor 13-yard pass from Ashton Daniels (Ashton Daniels run for 2-pt conversion) (Drive: 8 plays, 80 yards, 4:39; Louisville 28–21)

Fourth quarter

- (9:44) LOU – Duke Watson 5-yard run (Brock Travelstead kick) (Drive: 11 plays, 77 yards, 5:16; Louisville 35–21)
- (6:37) STAN – Emmett Mosely V 4-yard pass from Ashton Daniels (Emmet Kenney kick) (Drive: 6 plays, 75 yards, 3:07; Louisville 35–28)
- (0:45) STAN – Emmett Mosely V 25-yard pass from Justin Lamson (Emmet Kenney kick) (Drive: 9 plays, 76 yards, 3:18; Tied 35–35)
- (0:00) STAN – Emmet Kenney 52-yard field goal (Drive: 2 plays, 21 yards, 0:04; Stanford 38–35)

Statistics	LOU	STAN
First downs	21	22
Total yards	432	406
Rushing yards	162	83
Passing yards	270	323
Passing: Comp–Att–Int	26–40–1	23–34–1
Time of possession	24:53	35:07

Team	Category	Player	Statistics
Louisville	Passing	Tyler Shough	26–39, 270 yards, TD, INT
Louisville	Rushing	Duke Watson	11 carries, 117 yards, 3 TD
Louisville	Receiving	Chris Bell	9 receptions, 112 yards, TD
Stanford	Passing	Ashton Daniels	22–33, 298 yards, 3 TD, INT
Stanford	Rushing	Cole Tabb	11 carries, 35 yards
Stanford	Receiving	Emmett Mosley V	13 receptions, 168 yards, 3 TD

=== at California (Big Game) ===
Game Eleven – Stanford Cardinal (3–7) vs California Golden Bears (5–5) – Game summary

Quarter	1	2	3	4	Total
Cardinal	14	0	7	0	21
Golden Bears	0	7	3	14	24

at California Memorial Stadium • Berkeley, California

- Date: Saturday November 23, 2024
- Game time: 12:30 p.m.
- Game weather: Cloudy • Temperature: 55 °F (13 °C) • Wind: SW at 8 miles per hour (13 km/h)
- Game attendance: 52,428
- Referee: Marcus Reed
- TV announcers (ACCN): Jorge Sedano (play-by-play), Orlando Franklin (analyst) and Morgan Uber (sideline)

Game information

First quarter

- (7:49) STAN – Justin Lamson 1-yard run, Emmet Kenney kick (Drive: 12 plays, 75 yards, 7:11; Stanford 7–0)
- (1:27) STAN – Justin Lamson 2-yard run, Emmet Kenney kick (Drive: 8 plays, 54 yards, 3:55; Stanford 14–0)

Second quarter

- (11:04) CAL – Trond Grizzell 16-yard pass from Fernando Mendoza, Derek Morris kick (Drive: 4 plays, 82 yards, 1:54; Stanford 14–7)

Third quarter

- (6:33) STAN – Emmett Mosley V 2-yard pass from Micah Ford, Emmet Kenney kick (Drive: 11 plays, 52 yards, 7:05; Stanford 21–7)
- (0:47) CAL – Ryan Coe 46-yard field goal (Drive: 12 plays, 54 yards, 4:43; Stanford 21–10)

Fourth quarter

- (10:09) CAL – Jonathan Brady 30-yard pass from Fernando Mendoza (Drive: 11 plays, 71 yards, 3:49; Stanford 21–16)
- (2:40) CAL – Jonathan Brady 22-yard pass from Fernando Mendoza, Jaydn Ott pass (Drive: 11 plays, 98 yards, 5:05; California 24–21)

Statistics	STAN	CAL
First downs	14	20
Total yards	259	371
Rushing yards	118	72
Passing yards	141	299
Passing: Comp–Att–Int	15–29–0	25–38–0
Time of possession	33:01	26:59

Team	Category	Player	Statistics
Stanford	Passing	Ashton Daniels	14/26, 139 yards
Stanford	Rushing	Ashton Daniels	21 carries, 63 yards
Stanford	Receiving	Emmett Mosley V	6 receptions, 63 yards, TD
California	Passing	Fernando Mendoza	25/36, 299 yards, 3 TD
California	Rushing	Fernando Mendoza	11 carries, 35 yards
California	Receiving	Trond Grizzell	4 receptions, 70 yards, TD

=== at San Jose State (Bill Walsh Legacy Game) ===
Game Twelve – Stanford Cardinal (3–8) vs San Jose State Spartans (6–5) – Game summary

Quarter	1	2	3	4	Total
Cardinal	3	7	7	14	31
Spartans	0	17	10	7	34

at CEFCU Stadium • San Jose, California

- Date: Friday November 29, 2024
- Game time: 1:00 p.m.
- Game weather: Sunny, 60 °F (16 °C)
- Game attendance: 19,117
- Referee: Justin Elliott
- TV announcers (CBS): Rich Waltz (play-by-play), Ross Tucker (analyst), and Amanda Guerra (sideline)

Game information

First quarter

- (5:49) STAN – Emmet Kenney 24-yard field goal (Drive: 12 plays, 65 yards, 7:01; Stanford 3–0)

Second quarter

- (9:03) SJSU – Nick Nash 20-yard pass from Walker Eget, Kyler Halvorsen kick (Drive: 7 plays, 96 yards, 3:02; San Jose State 7–3)
- (5:19) SJSU – Nick Nash 2-yard pass from Walker Eget, Kyler Halvorsen kick (Drive: 6 plays, 24 yards, 3:32; San Jose State 14–3)
- (0:42) STAN – Emmett Mosley V 12-yard pass from Ashton Daniels, Emmet Kenney kick (Drive: 14 plays, 75 yards, 4:37; San Jose State 14–10)
- (0:00) SJSU – Kyler Halvorsen 45-yard field goal (Drive: 7 plays, 47 yards, 0:42; San Jose State 17–10)

Third quarter

- (12:45) SJSU – Justin Lockhart 19-yard pass from Walker Eget, Kyler Halvorsen kick (Drive: 5 plays, 75 yards, 2:15; San Jose State 24–10)
- (9:13) STAN – Justin Lamson 1-yard rush, Emmet Kenney kick (Drive: 9 plays, 65 yards, 3:32; San Jose State 24–17)
- (4:57) SJSU – Kyler Halvorsen 24-yard field goal (Drive: 10 plays, 58 yards, 4:16; San Jose State 27–17)

Fourth quarter

- (14:46) STAN – Jahsiah Galvan 2-yard fumble return, Emmet Kenney kick (Drive: 5 plays, -5 yards, 2:00; San Jose State 27–24)
- (7:39) STAN – Ashton Daniels 1-yard run, Emmet Kenney kick (Drive: 5 plays, 53 yards, 2:35; Stanford 31–27)
- (1:55) SJSU – TreyShun Hurry 18-yard pass from Walker Eget, Kyler Halvorsen kick (Drive: 3 plays, 37 yards, 0:44; San Jose State 34–31)

Statistics	STAN	SJSU
First downs	21	30
Total yards	379	443
Rushing yards	127	58
Passing yards	252	385
Passing: Comp–Att–Int	26–40–3	33–50–1
Time of possession	31:18	28:37

Team	Category	Player	Statistics
Stanford	Passing	Ashton Daniels	26/40, 252 yards, TD, 3 INT
Stanford	Rushing	Ashton Daniels	17 carries, 91 yards, TD
Stanford	Receiving	Elic Ayomanor	10 receptions, 109 yards
San Jose State	Passing	Walker Eget	33/49, 385 yards, 4 TD, INT
San Jose State	Rushing	Lamar Radcliffe	7 carries, 43 yards
San Jose State	Receiving	Nick Nash	8 receptions, 91 yards, 2 TD

== Roster ==
2024 Stanford Cardinal football team roster
Players
Coaches
Offense

Pos.	#	Name	Class
WR	0	Mudia Reuben	Jr
QB	2	Elijah Brown	Fr
WR	3	Bryce Farrell	GS
RB	5	Chris Davis Jr.	Fr
QB	8	Justin Lamson	Jr
QB	9	Myles Jackson	So
WR	10	Emmett Mosley V	Fr
WR	13	Elic Ayomanor	RSo
QB	14	Ashton Daniels	Jr
RB	15	Ryan Butler	Jr
QB	17	Charlie Mirer	Jr
WR	19	Chase Farrell	Fr
RB	20	Micah Ford	Fr
WR	24	Tiger Bachmeier	So
WR	25	Marcus Brown	Fr
RB	26	Sedrick Irvin	So
WR	32	Owen van Loben Sels	Fr
RB	33	Cole Tabb	Fr
RB	34	Champ Hampton	So
RB	36	Kenaj Washington	Jr
WR	37	Myles Libman	So
WR	39	Tyler Kuo	So
WR	40	Jason Thompson	Jr
TE	41	Griffin Waiss	Jr
TE	46	Chico Holt	So
WR	49	Evan Jackson	Sr
OL	51	Ziron Brown	Fr
OL	55	Simione Pale	So
OL	56	Hayden Gunter	Fr
OL	57	Levi Rogers	GS
OL	58	Kahlil House	Fr
OL	59	Charlie Hoitink	Fr
OL	61	Trevor Mayberry	Sr
OL	63	Carson Caplan	Fr
OL	65	Allen Thomason	So
OL	67	Fisher Anderson	Jr
OL	69	Jake Maikkula	Jr
OL	71	Connor McLaughlin	GS
OL	72	Austin Uke	Sr
OL	73	Charlie Symonds	So
OL	76	Jack Leyrer	Sr
OL	78	Luke Baklenko	So
WR	80	David Kasemervisz	Sr
WR	81	Ahmari Borden	RFr
WR	82	Jayson Raines	Sr
WR	83	Jackson Harris	RFr
WR	84	Ismael Cisse	RFr
TE	85	Shield Taylor	Sr
TE	86	Sam Roush	Jr
TE	87	Aiden Black	Fr
TE	88	Benji Blackburn	Fr
TE	89	Lukas Ungar	GS

Defense

Pos.	#	Name	Class
ILB	0	Gaethan Bernadel	Sr
OLB	2	Dylan Stephenson	Fr
CB	4	Zahran Manley	GS
S	5	Jay Green	Jr
CB	6	Collin Wright	Jr
ILB	8	Tristan Sinclair	GS
CB	9	Brandon Nicholson	Fr
OLB	11	Tevarua Tafiti	Jr
OLB	14	Wilfredo Aybar	Sr
CB	17	Jshawn Frausto-Ramos	So
S	18	Jaylen'Dai Sumlin	Fr
S	21	Scotty Edwards	Jr
S	22	Ché Ojarikre	So
OLB	23	David Bailey	Jr
ILB	25	Bo Tate	Fr
S	27	Omari Porter	GS
CB	28	Cam Richardson	Fr
S	29	Darrius Davis	Fr
ILB	30	Ese Dubre	Sr
CB	31	Aaron Morris	So
S	32	Mitch Leigber	Sr
CB	34	Javion Randall	Fr
ILB	35	Matt Rose	Jr
OLB	36	Tre Williams	So
S	38	Kale Lucas	Sr
S	39	Charlie Eckhardt	Fr
DL	40	Tobin Phillips	GS
ILB	41	Anson Pulsipher	Jr
DL	42	Jacobi Murray	Fr
ILB	43	Jahsiah Galvan	RSo
OLB	44	Ernest Cooper	Jr
OLB	45	Omar Staples	So
DB	46	Adam Rourke	So
ILB	48	Drew Cunningham	Fr
DL	50	R.J. Gaskins	So
ILB	51	Sam Mattingly	Fr
ILB	52	Maxwell Richardson	Fr
ILB	54	Preston Jernegan	Fr
DL	55	Joe Asiain	Fr
ILB	56	Miles McGee	So
DL	58	Brendan Delaney	Fr
DL	75	Braden Marceau-Olayinka	So
OLB	90	Gavin Geweniger	So
DL	91	Clay Patterson	GS
DL	94	Anthony Franklin	Sr
DL	95	Aristotle Taylor	Sr
DL	96	Connor Bachhuber	Fr
DL	97	Zach Rowell	Jr
DL	98	Zach Buckey	Sr
DL	99	Benedict Umeh	Fr

Special teams

Pos.	#	Name	Class
K	13	Emmet Kenney	Sr
P	15	Connor Weselman	Sr
P	37	Aidan Flintoft	So
LS	47	Alejandro Chavez	Jr
K	92	AJ Seidler	Fr
LS	93	Peyton Warford	Jr

Head coach

- Troy Taylor – Offensive coordinator/quarterbacks

Coordinators/assistant coaches

- Bobby April III – Defensive coordinator/outside linebackers
- Tyler Osborne – Wide receivers/assistant quarterbacks
- Bob Gregory – Safeties/special teams coordinator
- Malcolm Agnew – Running backs
- Nate Byham – Tight ends
- Mark D'Onofrio – Inside linebackers
- Ross Kolodziej – Defensive line
- Al Netter – Co-offensive line
- Viane Talamaivao – Co-offensive line
- Paul Williams – Cornerbacks
- Corey Edsall – Offensive quality control analyst
- Tsuyoshi Kawata – Offensive quality control analyst
- Vavae Malepeai – Offensive quality control analyst
- Thomas Merkle – Offensive quality control analyst
- Joseph Montag – Senior defensive quality control analyst
- Pete Haffner – Defensive quality control analyst
- Clevan "Tank" Williams – Defensive quality control analyst
- Fred Guidici – Senior special teams quality control analyst
- Ryan Deatrick – Director of football sports performance
- Anthony Lazard – Assistant director of football sports performance/applied sport science coordinator
- Tristan McLaren – Assistant director of football sports performance
- Dorian Parris – Assistant director of football sports performance
- Austin Sparks – Assistant director of football sports performance

Legend

- (C) Team captain
- (S) Suspended
- (I) Ineligible
- Injured
- Redshirt

Roster
Last update: September 23, 2024
