= Ashton Daniels =

American football player (born 2004)

No. 14 – Florida State Seminoles
- Position: Quarterback
- Class: Senior

Personal information
- Born: May 29, 2004 (age 22); Atlanta, Georgia, U.S.
- Listed height: 6 ft 2 in (1.88 m)
- Listed weight: 233 lb (106 kg)

Career information
- High school: Buford (Buford, Georgia)
- College: Stanford (2022–2024); Auburn (2025); Florida State (2026–present)
- Stats at ESPN

Ashton Daniels (born May 29, 2004) is an American college football quarterback for the Florida State Seminoles. He previously played for the Stanford Cardinal and Auburn Tigers.

== Early life ==
Daniels attended Buford High School in Buford, Georgia. As quarterback for the Buford Wolves, he led his team to three straight state championships. He committed to Stanford University to play college football.

== College career ==
=== Stanford ===
As a true freshman, Daniels spent time as the backup quarterback to Tanner McKee. On the season, he served as the team's wildcat quarterback, appearing in designated formations. He made his collegiate debut in the season-opening win against Colgate. In Week 9 against Washington State, he recorded his first two collegiate rushing touchdowns in a loss. He finished the season appearing in 10 games with 25 carries for 156 yards and three rushing touchdowns while completing five of six passes for 39 yards.

In 2023, Daniels won the starting quarterback competition over Justin Lamson and Ari Patu. Daniels made his first collegiate start in the 2023 season opener against Hawaii, where he completed 25 of 36 passes for 248 yards and two touchdowns in a 37–24 victory. After three consecutive losses to No. 6 USC, FCS Sacramento State, and Arizona, Daniels was benched in favor of Lamson prior to the Cardinal’s matchup against No. 9 Oregon. Following a loss to the Ducks and a 29–0 deficit to Colorado, Daniels came off the bench and threw for a career-high 396 yards on 27 of 45 passing with four touchdowns to rally the Cardinal to a 46–43 double overtime victory. He threw three touchdown passes to Elic Ayomanor, including a 97-yard touchdown. It was the largest comeback in school history. He started the remaining six games of the season as Stanford finished 3–9. On the season, he appeared in all 12 games and started 10, completing 191 of 325 passes for 2,247 yards, 11 touchdowns, and eight interceptions while adding 292 rushing yards and three touchdowns.

Daniels returned as the starting quarterback for the 2024 season. In the season-opening loss to TCU, he completed 17 of 35 passes for 163 yards with a touchdown and an interception while rushing for 87 yards. In the following game against Cal Poly, he completed 19 of 23 passes for 221 yards and two touchdowns. In Week 3 against Syracuse, Daniels led the Cardinal on a game-winning field-goal drive en route to a 26–24 victory, completing 23 of 38 passes for 178 yards with a touchdown and two interceptions. The following week, in a 40–14 loss to No. 17 Clemson, Daniels threw three interceptions before being helped off the field in the fourth quarter and did not return. He subsequently missed the following week's loss against Virginia Tech. He returned to start the next two games, losses to No. 11 Notre Dame and No. 21 SMU, and was replaced by Elijah Brown against the Mustangs. Daniels came off the bench for Brown the following game against Wake Forest in a near-comeback attempt as the Cardinal lost 27–24. Daniels completed 24 of 31 passes for 214 yards and a touchdown, but threw two interceptions, including one on Stanford's final drive with the team within range of a potential game-tying field goal. He started the following game against NC State and ran for a season-high 129 yards and two touchdowns in a loss. The following week against No. 19 Louisville, he completed 22 of 33 passes for a season-high 298 yards, three touchdowns, and one interception while leading the Cardinal to a 38–35 comeback victory that included a 52-yard game-winning field goal. In the final two games of the year, Stanford fell to rival California in the Big Game and San Jose State in the season finale, in which Daniels threw three interceptions. Stanford finished 3–9 for the second consecutive season and went 3–7 in games Daniels started. He completed 170 of 271 passes for 1,700 yards, 10 touchdowns, and 12 interceptions while rushing for 669 yards on 148 carries with three touchdowns. On December 5, 2024, Daniels entered the transfer portal after three seasons at Stanford.

=== Auburn ===
On December 16, 2024, Daniels announced he was transferring to Auburn University to play for the Tigers. He lost the starting quarterback competition to fellow transfer Jackson Arnold. Daniels made his season debut in Week 8 against Arkansas after Arnold was benched following a pick-six, leading Auburn to a 28–21 victory. He was named the starter against Kentucky, completing 13 of 28 passes for 108 yards and an interception in a 10–3 loss. Against No. 16 Vanderbilt, Daniels completed 31 of 44 passes for a season-high 353 yards and two touchdowns while rushing for 89 yards and two touchdowns in an overtime loss. Auburn then held him out against FCS Mercer in favor of true freshman Deuce Knight to preserve his redshirt. He returned to start the season finale in the Iron Bowl against No. 10 Alabama, completing 18 of 39 passes for 259 yards, a touchdown, and an interception while rushing for 108 yards on 23 carries in a 27–20 loss. He finished the season appearing in four games with three starts, completing 68 of 119 passes for 797 yards, three touchdowns, and two interceptions while rushing for 280 yards and two touchdowns. On December 21, 2025, Daniels entered the transfer portal.

=== Florida State ===
On January 6, 2026, Daniels committed to transfer to Florida State University as a graduate transfer with one year of eligibility remaining. He won the starting quarterback competition over fellow graduate transfer Dean DeNobile from Lafayette, redshirt freshman Kevin Sperry, and true freshman Jaden O'Neal. In his Seminole debut in the 2026 season opener against New Mexico State, Daniels completed 17 of 27 passes for 202 yards with a touchdown and an interception while rushing for a touchdown in a 34–17 victory.

=== Statistics ===
Season	Team	Games			Passing								Rushing			
Season	Team	GP	GS	Record	Cmp	Att	Pct	Yds	Y/A	TD	Int	Rtg	Att	Yds	Avg	TD
2022	Stanford	10	0	—	5	6	83.3	39	6.5	0	0	137.9	25	156	6.2	3
2023	Stanford	12	10	2–8	191	325	58.8	2,247	6.9	11	8	123.1	109	292	2.7	3
2024	Stanford	11	10	3–7	170	271	62.7	1,700	6.3	10	12	118.7	148	669	4.5	3
2025	Auburn	4	3	0–3	68	119	57.1	797	6.7	3	2	118.4	63	280	4.4	2
2026	Florida State	11	11	5–6	177	300	59.0	2,515	8.4	14	14	135.6	125	459	3.7	13
Career		48	34	10–24	611	1,021	59.8	7,298	7.1	38	36	125.1	471	1,860	3.9	24
