= Troy Taylor (American football) =

American football player and coach (born 1968)

No. 14, 11
- Position: Quarterback

Personal information
- Born: April 5, 1968 (age 58); Downey, California, U.S.
- Listed height: 6 ft 4 in (1.93 m)
- Listed weight: 200 lb (91 kg)

Career information
- High school: Cordova (Rancho Cordova, California)
- College: California (1986–1989)
- NFL draft: 1990: 4th round, 84th overall pick

Career history

Playing
- New York Jets (1990–1991); Miami Dolphins (1993)*
- * Offseason or practice squad member only

Coaching
- Casa Roble HS (CA) (1994) Offensive coordinator; Colorado (1995) Graduate assistant; California (1996) Wide receivers coach; California (1997–1998) Quarterbacks coach; California (1999–2000) Tight ends coach; Christian Brothers HS (CA) (2000–2002) Assistant coach; Folsom HS (CA) (2002–2005) Co-head coach; Folsom HS (CA) (2012–2015) Co-head coach; Eastern Washington (2016) Co-offensive coordinator / quarterbacks coach; Utah (2017–2018) Offensive coordinator / quarterbacks coach; Sacramento State (2019–2022) Head coach; Stanford (2023–2024) Head coach

Awards and highlights
- As a coach: Eddie Robinson Award (2019); 2× Big Sky Coach of the Year (2019, 2021)

Career NFL statistics
- Passing attempts: 20
- Passing completions: 12
- Completion percentage: 60.0%
- TD–INT: 2–1
- Passing yards: 125
- Passer rating: 90.6
- Stats at Pro Football Reference

Head coaching record
- Career: NCAA: 36–26 (.581)

Troy Scott Taylor (born April 5, 1968) is an American college football coach and former player. He was the head football coach for the Stanford Cardinal from 2023 until March 2025. Taylor played professionally as a quarterback for the New York Jets of the National Football League (NFL). Taylor played college football for the California Golden Bears and was selected by the Jets in the fourth round of the 1990 NFL draft.

After his playing career, Taylor served as co-head football coach at Folsom High School in Folsom, California, from 2012 to 2015; co-offensive coordinator at Eastern Washington in 2016; offensive coordinator at Utah from 2017 to 2018; and as head coach at Sacramento State from 2019 to 2022.

== Playing career ==
Taylor attended Cordova High School in Rancho Cordova, California. He led his team to a perfect 14–0 record and section championship, also being named northern California player of the year. Taylor played college football at the University of California, Berkeley, as starting quarterback from 1986 to 1989. He led the Pac-10 conference in total offense in 1989 (253 yds. per game). He finished his collegiate career as Cal's all-time leading passer (8,126 yds.) and total offense leader (8,236 yds.), records that stood until they were broken by Jared Goff in 2015. His 51 career touchdown passes stood as a school record until surpassed by Pat Barnes in 1996.

Pre-draft measurables
Height	Weight	Arm length	Hand span	40-yard dash	10-yard split	20-yard split	20-yard shuttle	Vertical jump
6 ft 3 3/8 in (1.91 m)	201 lb (91 kg)	29 3/8 in (0.75 m)	9 5/8 in (0.24 m)	4.73 s	1.65 s	2.86 s	4.13 s	33.5 in (0.85 m)
All values from the NFL Combine

Taylor was drafted in the fourth round (84th overall pick) of the 1990 NFL draft by the New York Jets. In his career, Taylor saw action in seven games and threw for 2 touchdown passes.

== Coaching career ==
In 1994, Taylor served as offensive coordinator at Casa Roble High School in Orangevale, California. He served one year on Rick Neuheisel's staff at Colorado as a graduate assistant in 1995 primarily working with wide receivers. He was hired by Steve Mariucci as California's wide receivers coach in 1996, and later served 2 years as a QB coach and 1 year as a tight ends coach under Tom Holmoe.

From 2000 to 2002, Taylor served as an assistant athletic director and coach for Christian Brothers High School in Sacramento. From 2002 to 2005, Taylor served as the co-head coach at Folsom High School. He left that position in 2005 to serve as color analyst for the California Golden Bears' radio broadcast. In 2012, he returned to Folsom High School as co-head coach of football, during the 4-year period he was there the bulldogs went 58-3 winning 4 consecutive section championships and a state title.

Taylor coached Washington quarterback Jake Browning since he was in 5th grade up until his senior year in high school, when he set the national touchdown record in a career with 229 TD passes while also tying a record of 91 touchdown passes in a single season, all while going 16–0 and a D1 state championship.

Taylor's offense at Folsom High School broke the state in passing for 4 straight years and set a state record for most points scored in a season, a record that still stands today. On February 18, 2016, Taylor was announced as the passing game coordinator and quarterbacks coach for Eastern Washington.

At Eastern Washington, Taylor called plays and took the offense to new heights as they set 2 all-time FCS records for passing yards (5,160 yards) and total offense (5,766 yards) in a season.

Taylor was instrumental in helping develop former walk-on quarterback Gage Gubrud into a record-setting QB who broke the all-time single-season FCS passing record and the all-time record in total offense. Gubrud also won the FCS player of the year award from numerous sites along with Big Sky Conference co-MVP (with teammate Cooper Kupp). Eastern Washington was also the only team to have 3 wide receivers over 1,000 yards in the season.

Gubrud also set 16 school records, 7 Big Sky records, and 2 FCS records, all while winning the Big Sky Conference title and going undefeated in conference play. Eastern Washington improved in almost every offensive statistical category in his first year. A notable win came in the first game of the season against Washington State where the Eagles won 45–42 and set a school record for total offense.

=== Sacramento State ===
On December 17, 2018, Taylor accepted the head coaching position at Sacramento State after spending the previous two years as the offensive coordinator at Utah.

On August 31, 2019, Taylor debuted in his first collegiate game as head coach, in which his team defeated Southern Oregon in a 77–19 game.

On November 23, 2019, Taylor and his Hornets football team clinched the school's first-ever share of the Big Sky Conference title in a 27–17 victory over UC Davis in the 2019 Causeway Classic game. This was Sacramento State's first Big Sky Conference title since the team's induction into the Big Sky in 1996.

On November 19, 2022, Taylor would lead the Hornets to their first undefeated regular season in school history after a 27–21 victory over UC Davis in the 2022 Causeway Classic along with their third Big Sky Conference title.

=== Stanford ===
On December 10, 2022, Taylor was hired to be the next head coach at Stanford, replacing long time coach David Shaw. He finished 3–9 in his first season including a loss to Sacramento State, his previous team. Stanford fired Taylor on March 25, 2025, following back to back 3–9 seasons, and an investigation into alleged bullying of members of the Stanford athletic department.

== Head coaching record ==
=== College ===
Year	Team	Overall	Conference	Standing	Bowl/playoffs	Coaches^{#}	STATS^{°}
Sacramento State Hornets (Big Sky Conference) (2019–2022)
2019	Sacramento State	9–4	7–1	T–1st	L NCAA Division I Second Round	9	9
2020–21	No team—COVID-19						
2021	Sacramento State	9–3	8–0	1st	L NCAA Division I Second Round	11	10
2022	Sacramento State	12–1	8–0	T–1st	L NCAA Division I Quarterfinal	4	5
Sacramento State:		30–8	23–1				
Stanford Cardinal (Pac-12 Conference) (2023)
2023	Stanford	3–9	2–7	T–9th			
Stanford Cardinal (Atlantic Coast Conference) (2024)
2024	Stanford	3–9	2–6	T–14th			
Stanford:		6–18	4–13				
Total:		36–26					
National championship Conference title Conference division title or championship game berth
