= Elic Ayomanor =

Canadian gridiron football player (born 2003)

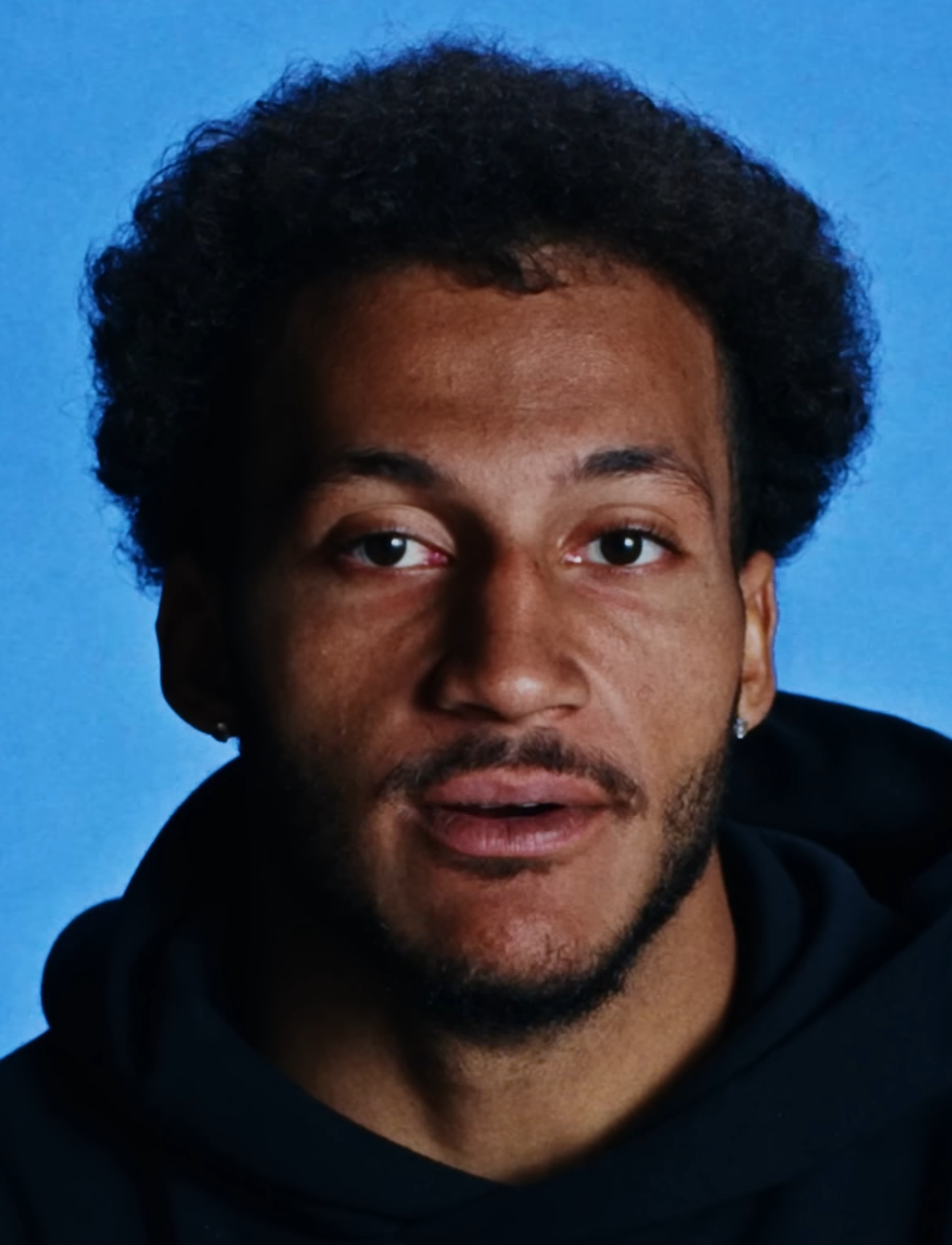
- Ayomanor in 2025

No. 5 – Tennessee Titans
- Position: Wide receiver
- Roster status: Active

Personal information
- Born: June 3, 2003 (age 23); Medicine Hat, Alberta, Canada
- Listed height: 6 ft 2 in (1.88 m)
- Listed weight: 206 lb (93 kg)

Career information
- High school: Deerfield Academy (Deerfield, Massachusetts, U.S.)
- College: Stanford (2022–2024)
- NFL draft: 2025: 4th round, 136th overall pick

Career history
- Tennessee Titans (2025–present)

Awards and highlights
- Jon Cornish Trophy (2023)

Career NFL statistics as of 2025
- Receptions: 41
- Receiving yards: 515
- Receiving touchdowns: 4
- Stats at Pro Football Reference

Elic Ayomanor (EL-lick EYE-yo-MAN-oor; born June 3, 2003) is a Canadian professional football wide receiver for the Tennessee Titans of the National Football League (NFL). He played college football for the Stanford Cardinal and was selected by the Titans in the fourth round of the 2025 NFL draft. He won the 2023 Jon Cornish Trophy as the top Canadian player in the NCAA and holds the Stanford record for receiving yards in a game.

== Early life ==
Ayomanor was born in Medicine Hat, Alberta, Canada, and has family roots in Kincaid, Saskatchewan. He played for Peddie School in New Jersey for one year. He then finished his last two years of high school at Deerfield Academy in Deerfield, Massachusetts. He was a star track athlete in high school, setting league records in the 100 (10.76) and 200 meters (21.66). He also excelled in football for Deerfield and was rated as a top 10 recruit in Massachusetts. He had scholarship offers from Stanford, Notre Dame, California, Tennessee, and Ole Miss. He is of Nigerian and Liberian descent.

== College career ==
Ayomanor enrolled at Stanford University in 2022. He did not appear in any games as a freshman due to injury.

Against Colorado on October 13, 2023, Ayomanor caught 13 passes for a school-record 294 receiving yards, all in the second half of the game. He led Stanford to a comeback victory after trailing, 29–0, tallying three touchdown receptions, including an overtime catch in which he pulled the ball over the helmet of Colorado's Travis Hunter.

== Professional career ==
On December 21, 2024, Ayomanor declared for the 2025 NFL draft.

Pre-draft measurables
Height	Weight	Arm length	Hand span	Wingspan	40-yard dash	10-yard split	20-yard split	Vertical jump	Broad jump	Bench press
6 ft 1 3/4 in (1.87 m)	206 lb (93 kg)	32 3/8 in (0.82 m)	10 in (0.25 m)	6 ft 6 3/8 in (1.99 m)	4.44 s	1.58 s	2.59 s	38.5 in (0.98 m)	10 ft 7 in (3.23 m)	15 reps
All values from NFL Combine/Pro Day

In April 2025, Ayomanor was ranked as the #1 prospect ahead of the 2025 CFL draft. He was drafted in the fourth round (136th overall) by the Tennessee Titans at the 2025 NFL draft and went undrafted in the 2025 CFL draft. Ayomanor was named as a starting wide receiver to start the 2025 season, alongside veterans Calvin Ridley and Tyler Lockett. In Week 2 against the Los Angeles Rams, Ayomanor recorded his first career touchdown on a nine-yard reception from Cam Ward. He finished his rookie season with 41 receptions for 515 yards and four touchdowns.

== Career statistics ==
=== NFL ===
Year	Team	Games		Receiving							Fumbles	
Year	Team	GP	GS	Tgt	Rec	Yds	Avg	Y/G	Lng	TD	Fum	Lost
2025	Tennessee Titans	16	14	89	41	515	12.6	32.2	39	4	0	0
Career		16	14	89	41	515	12.6	32.2	39	4	0	0

=== College ===
Year	Team	GP	Receiving				
Year	Team	GP	Rec	Yds	Avg	Lng	TD
2022	Stanford	Redshirt					
2023	Stanford	12	62	1,013	16.3	97	6
2024	Stanford	12	63	831	13.2	60	6
Career		24	125	1,844	14.8	97	12
