= Ross Kolodziej =

American football player and coach (born 1978)

Stanford Cardinal
- Title: Defensive line coach

Personal information
- Born: May 11, 1978 (age 48); Stevens Point, Wisconsin, U.S.
- Listed height: 6 ft 3 in (1.91 m)
- Listed weight: 292 lb (132 kg)

Career information
- High school: Stevens Point Area
- College: Wisconsin (2000)
- NFL draft: 2001: 7th round, 230th overall pick

Career history

Playing
- New York Giants (2001); San Francisco 49ers (2002); New York Giants (2002); San Francisco 49ers (2003); Arizona Cardinals (2004–2005); Minnesota Vikings (2006); Arizona Cardinals (2007); Las Vegas Locomotives (2009); Omaha Nighthawks (2010)*; Las Vegas Locomotives (2010–2011)
- * Offseason or practice squad member only

Coaching
- Wisconsin (2012) Graduate assistant; Pittsburgh (2013) Assistant strength and conditioning coach; Pittsburgh (2014) Strength and conditioning coach; Wisconsin (2015–2020) Strength and conditioning coach; Wisconsin (2021–2022) Defensive line coach; Stanford (2023–2025) Defensive line coach; Northwestern (2026–present) Defensive line coach

Awards and highlights
- 2× UFL champion (2009, 2010)

Career NFL statistics
- Total tackles: 54
- Sacks: 4
- Forced fumbles: 2
- Fumble recoveries: 2
- Stats at Pro Football Reference

Ross Anthony Kolodziej (born May 11, 1978) is an American football coach and former player. He is the defensive line coach for the Stanford Cardinal. He played professionally as a defensive tackle in the National Football League (NFL). He was selected by the New York Giants in the seventh round of the 2001 NFL draft. He played college football for the Wisconsin Badgers

Kolodziej was also a member of the San Francisco 49ers, Arizona Cardinals, Minnesota Vikings and Omaha Nighthawks.

== Professional playing career ==
Ross spent seven years in the NFL after initially being drafted by the Giants in the seventh round of the 2001 NFL Draft.

== Coaching career ==
Ross began his coaching career at his alma mater working as a graduate assistant for the 2012 season. He then followed Paul Chryst to Pitt where he served as an assistant strength and conditioning coach in 2013 . For the 2014 season Ross was promoted to head strength and conditioning coach. In 2015 Ross once again followed Chryst this time back to Wisconsin where he served as the head strength and conditioning coach from 2015 to 2020. In 2021 he was named the team's new defensive line coach taking over for Inoke Breckterfield, who left to join the staff at Vanderbilt.

== Personal life ==
Kolodziej and his wife, Miriam, have four children; Liz, Taylor, Asher and Abram.
