= E. J. Smith (American football) =

American football player (born 2002)

Kansas City Chiefs
- Position: Running back
- Roster status: Practice squad

Personal information
- Born: May 15, 2002 (age 24); Dallas, Texas, U.S.
- Listed height: 6 ft 0 in (1.83 m)
- Listed weight: 208 lb (94 kg)

Career information
- High school: Jesuit College Prep (TX)
- College: Stanford (2020–2023); Texas A&M (2024–2025)
- NFL draft: 2026: undrafted

Career history
- Kansas City Chiefs (2026–present)*
- * Offseason or practice squad member only
- Stats at Pro Football Reference

Emmitt James Smith IV (born May 15, 2002) is an American professional football running back for the Kansas City Chiefs of the National Football League (NFL). He played college football for the Stanford Cardinal and Texas A&M Aggies. He is the son of former NFL running back Emmitt Smith.

== Early life ==
Smith was born on May 15, 2002. He is the son of Pro Football Hall of Famer Emmitt Smith, the leading rusher in NFL history. E. J. attended Jesuit College Preparatory School of Dallas. He tallied 902 rushing yards in 2019 and 872 rushing yards in 2018. He was rated by ESPN as the No. 48 prospect in the Class of 2020.

== College career ==
Smith enrolled at Stanford in 2020. He appeared in two games as a freshman but had no rushing carries and caught three passes for seven yards.

As a sophomore in 2021, he was used principally as a backup to Austin Jones and Nathaniel Peat. He scored his first collegiate touchdown against Vanderbilt on September 18, 2021. With limited playing time in 2021, Smith rushed 26 times for 133 yards (5.1 yards per carry) and caught 15 passes for 74 yards.

=== 2022 season ===
After the 2021 season, Austin Jones transferred to USC, and Nathaniel Peat transferred to Missouri. Smith was slated to take over in 2022 as Stanford's top running back. Going into the 2022 season, Stanford coach David Shaw called Smith "the total package" and predicted that he would be "one of the best backs in America" over the next two seasons.

Pro Football Focus rated Smith as one its 31 breakout candidates, only two of whom are running backs, for the 2022 college football season. Pro Football Focus cited Smith's 14 broken tackles in 2021 along with five explosive runs and "excellent vision, patience and elusiveness as a runner." He was also named to the 2022 Doak Walker Award watch list.

On his first carry of the 2022 season, Smith ran 87 yards for a touchdown. He finished that game with 118 rushing yards and two touchdowns on 11 carries. He totaled 206 rushing yards with three touchdowns in the first two games. However, his season ended prematurely due to an injury.

=== 2023 season ===
On November 28, 2023, Smith announced that he would be entering the transfer portal. On January 7, 2024, Smith announced that he would be transferring to Texas A&M.

== Professional career ==
Pre-draft measurables
Height	Weight	Arm length	Hand span	Wingspan	40-yard dash	10-yard split	20-yard split	20-yard shuttle	Three-cone drill	Vertical jump	Broad jump	Bench press
5 ft 11 3/4 in (1.82 m)	208 lb (94 kg)	31 1/4 in (0.79 m)	10 in (0.25 m)	6 ft 3 in (1.91 m)	4.60 s	1.56 s	2.58 s	4.30 s	7.34 s	35.5 in (0.90 m)	10 ft 0 in (3.05 m)	20 reps
All values from Pro Day

Smith signed with the Kansas City Chiefs as an undrafted free agent on May 1, 2026. He was waived/injured by the team on August 30. On November 17, Smith was re-signed to the practice squad.
