= Bobby April III =

American football coach

Buffalo Bills
- Title: Outside linebackers coach

Personal information
- Born: Tucson, Arizona, U.S.

Career information
- High school: St. Paul's (LA)
- College: Louisiana–Lafayette

Career history
- Louisiana–Lafayette (2004) Student assistant; Tulane (2005–2006) Graduate assistant; Portland State (2007–2009) Special teams coordinator & inside linebackers coach; Nicholls State (2010) Special teams coordinator & safeties coach; Philadelphia Eagles (2011–2012) Defensive quality control coach; New York Jets (2013–2014); Defensive quality control & assistant linebackers coach (2013); Linebackers coach (2014); Buffalo Bills (2015–2016) Linebackers coach; Wisconsin (2018–2022) Co-defensive coordinator & outside linebackers coach; Stanford (2023–2025) Defensive coordinator & outside linebackers coach; Buffalo Bills (2026–present) Outside linebackers coach

Robert April III is an American football coach who is the outside linebackers coach for Buffalo Bills of the National Football League (NFL).

== Coaching career ==
=== College career ===
April III began his coaching career in 2004 as a student assistant for the Louisiana–Lafayette Ragin' Cajuns. He then became a graduate assistant for the Tulane Green Wave from 2005 to 2006. In 2007, April III became the special teams coordinator and inside linebackers coach for the Portland State Vikings through 2009. In 2010, he was special teams coordinator and safeties coach for the Nicholls State Colonels.

In 2018, April III returned to college football as outside linebackers coach / co-defensive coordinator for the Wisconsin Badgers. He became the defensive coordinator for Stanford Cardinal in 2023, in addition to his duties as the outside linebackers coach.

=== Professional career ===
April III was defensive quality control coach for the Philadelphia Eagles from 2011 to 2012. In 2013, April III moved to the New York Jets as defensive quality control coach and assistant linebacker coach. In 2014, he was promoted to linebackers coach with the Jets. In 2015, April III moved with Rex Ryan from the Jets to the Buffalo Bills and continued to serve as linebackers coach through 2016.

On February 1, 2026, April III returned to the Buffalo Bills as the team's new outside linebackers coach, under head coach Joe Brady. April III had accepted a position to be the defensive ends coach with Minnesota in the college ranks only a month earlier.

== Personal life ==
April earned his bachelor's degree in sports management from Louisiana-Lafayette. He is the son of Bobby April Jr., a former NFL and college special teams coordinator.
