= 2025 Arkansas State Red Wolves football team =

American college football season

2025 Arkansas State Red Wolves football

Xbox Bowl champion

Xbox Bowl, W 34–28 vs. Missouri State
- Conference: Sun Belt Conference
- West Division
- Record: 7–6 (5–3 Sun Belt)
- Head coach: Butch Jones (5th season)
- Offensive coordinator: Keith Heckendorf (7th season)
- Offensive scheme: Power spread
- Defensive coordinator: Griff McCarley (1st season)
- Base defense: 4–2–5
- Home stadium: Centennial Bank Stadium

2025 Sun Belt Conference football standings
	Conf.			Overall
Team	W		L	W		L
East Division
No. 19 James Madison xy$^	8	–	0	12	–	2
Old Dominion	6	–	2	10	–	3
Coastal Carolina	5	–	3	6	–	7
Georgia Southern	4	–	4	7	–	6
Marshall	3	–	5	5	–	7
Appalachian State	2	–	6	5	–	8
Georgia State	0	–	8	1	–	11
West Division
Troy xy	6	–	2	8	–	6
Southern Miss	5	–	3	7	–	6
Louisiana	5	–	3	6	–	7
Arkansas State	5	–	3	7	–	6
Texas State	3	–	5	7	–	6
South Alabama	3	–	5	4	–	8
Louisiana–Monroe	1	–	7	3	–	9
Championship: James Madison 31, Troy 14
^ – College Football Playoff participant; $ – Conference champion; x – Division champion/co-champions; y – Championship game participant; Rankings from AP Poll

The 2025 Arkansas State Red Wolves football team represented Arkansas State University in the Sun Belt Conference's West Division during the 2025 NCAA Division I FBS football season. The Red Wolves were led by Butch Jones in his fifth year as the head coach. The Red Wolves played home games at Centennial Bank Stadium, located in Jonesboro, Arkansas. On September 6, the Red Wolves played the Arkansas Razorbacks for the first time ever. The game was played in Little Rock at War Memorial Stadium.

== Offseason ==
=== Transfers ===
==== Outgoing ====
Player	Position	Destination
Wyatt Wright	LB	Alabama A&M
Palmer Harris	LS	Arkansas–Monticello
Kanon LaRusso	S	Arkansas Tech
David Paglianite	TE	Arkansas Tech
Carter Salzman	WR	Benedictine
Timothy Gulley	DL	Bethune–Cookman
Timmy McClain	QB	Bethune–Cookman
Spencer Makell	CB	Butler CC
Brook Honore	P	California
Landon Bridges	IOL	Central Arkansas
Orlando Daniels	EDGE	Chattanooga
AJ Wallace	S	Chattanooga
Brian Alston	DL	East Tennessee State
Jacob Pequeno	OL	Emporia State
Websley Etienne	S	FIU
Bobby Engstler	P	Florida A&M
Jakwon McGinney	DL	Georgia Southern
Braxton Nixon-Snell	DT	Henderson State
Kiandre Terry	WR	Hinds CC
JJ Harrell	WR	Holmes CC
Elijah Zollicoffer	OL	Kennesaw State
Jayvion Showers	WR	Kilgore
Payton Greer	RB	Lafayette
Dontay Joyner	CB	Maryland
Ty Collins	QB	Memphis
Brock Simmons	OL	Missouri Southern
James Rexroat	TE	Missouri State
Trace Corum	WR	Murray State
Graham McLelland	OL	Murray State
Aidan Ellison	K	North Central
Logan Eason	LB	Ouachita Baptist
Ian Jeffries	DL	Purdue
Miller McCrumby	TE	South Alabama
RJ Kelly	LB	South Carolina State
Tennel Bryant	WR	South Dakota
Calen Presser	DE	South Dakota
Skylar Purifoy	TE	Southwestern Oklahoma State
Reginald Harden Jr.	WR	Tarleton State
DeAubry Hood	CB	Tarleton State
Tim Hardiman	DL	Tulsa
Makilan Thomas	IOL	Virginia
Jourdyn Burruss	LB	Unknown
Kionte Curry	S	Unknown
Caleb Donaldson	WR	Unknown
Jayden Jones	EDGE	Medical Retirement
Takare Lipscomb	WR	Unknown
Mike Sharpe II	RB	Unknown
Jamil Williams	LB	Unknown

==== Incoming ====
Player	Position	Previous school
Noland Asberry	DE	Alabama
Orlando Daniels	EDGE	Albion
Trenton Alan Yowe	S	Appalachian State
Zuri Madison	IOL	Arkansas
Bobby Engstler	P	California
Gavin Ransaw	DL	Coastal Carolina
AJ Carlson	TE	Dayton
BJ Wagner	S	Delaware State
Nana Burris	WR	FIU
Quan Lee	WR	Florida A&M
Adam Hickerson	IOL	Gardner–Webb
Cedric Franklin	S	Georgia Tech
Aaron Blancas	WR	Idaho State
Trevon Howard	S	Iowa State
Christopher Boti	DL	Liberty
Luke Wisham	CB	Louisiana Tech
AG McGhee	CB	Marshall
Simeon Mitchell	DL	McNeese
Javante Mackey	LB	Memphis
Kobe Williams	IOL	Memphis
Aaron Alexander	LB	Michigan State
Devyn Curtis	LB	Middle Tennessee
JJ Harrell	WR	Mississippi State
Wyatt Wright	LB	NC State
Aiden Kehm	OL	Nevada
Jacob Walker	RB	North Greenville
Quincy Wright	DL	North Texas
Zach Person	TE	Northern Michigan
Daniel Demery	LB	Ole Miss
Jordan Smart	WR	Ole Miss
Quincy Wright	DT	Oregon State
Jax Brown	QB	Sam Houston
Jackson Waller	P	SMU
Joedrick Lewis	CB	Southeast Missouri State
Kenyon Clay	RB	Southern Miss
Ethan Crawford	QB	Southern Miss
Wil Saxton	IOL	Southern Miss
DeMarcus Hendricks	EDGE	Texas A&M–Kingsville
Gabriel Fortson	IOL	Tulane
Terry Kirksey	LB	UConn
Avante Dickerson	CB	Utah State
Malik McConico	CB	Utah State
Tyler Fortenberry	TE	Vanderbilt
Jaylen Bonelli	WR	Wagner
Cody Sigler	DL	West Alabama

== Preseason ==
=== Media poll ===
In the Sun Belt preseason coaches' poll, the Red Wolves were picked to finish third place in the West division.

Kicker Clune Van Andel was named the Preseason Special Teams Player of the Year.

Wide receiver Corey Rucker and defensive lineman Bryan Whitehead were awarded to be in the preseason All-Sun Belt first team offense and defense. Kicker Clune Van Andel and associated press player Ja'Quez Cross were named to the All-Sun Belt first team special teams.

Running back Ja'Quez Cross was named in the second team offense and special teams.

== Personnel ==
2025 Arkansas State Red Wolves football team roster
Players
Coaches
Offense

Pos.	#	Name	Class
WR	0	Nana Burris	Sr
QB	1	Jaylen Raynor	Jr
RB	2	Ja'Quez Cross	Sr
WR	3	Hunter Summers	So
WR	4	JJ Harrell	Fr
RB	5	Kenyon Clay	Jr
QB	6	Ethan Crawford	Jr
WR	7	Corey Rucker	Sr
QB	8	Josh Flowers	Fr
WR	9	Jordan Smart	Sr
WR	10	Jaylen Bonelli	Jr
WR	11	Demarcco Blanton	Jr
QB	13	Tyrell Lewis	Fr
WR	14	Andre Feast	Fr
WR	15	Andrew Jones	Fr
WR	16	Chauncy Cobb	So
TE	17	Jabari Bush	Fr
WR	18	Romel Stevens	Fr
TE	19	Tyler Fortenberry	Jr
WR	20	Aaron Blancas	Sr
WR	21	Quan Lee	Jr
RB	22	Cedric Hawkins	So
RB	24	Devin Spencer	So
QB	26	Jax Brown	Fr
RB	27	Jacob Walker	So
RB	28	DD Murray	Fr
RB	30	Damon Sisa	Fr
RB	32	Nasir Allen	Fr
RB	33	Kameron Thomas	Fr
RB	36	Omarion Brown	Fr
OL	50	Wil Saxton	Jr
OL	51	Cade Channell	Fr
OL	52	Mason Myers	So
OL	54	Walker Davis	So
OL	55	Aleric Watson	Jr
OL	57	Dan'tay Ward Jr.	Fr
OL	58	Cameron Ambrose	Jr
OL	59	Zuri Madison	Fr
OL	61	Adam Hickerson	Jr
OL	63	Aiden Kehm	Fr
OL	64	Noah Hacker	Fr
OL	65	Noah Smith	Sr
OL	68	Tristian Smith	Jr
OL	70	Royce Baucom	Fr
OL	71	Chace Stratford	Sr
OL	73	Kobe Williams	Fr
OL	76	Trason Hunt	Fr
OL	77	Gabe Fortson	So
OL	78	Riley McGehee	So
OL	79	Baker North	Fr
TE	81	Javeon Fricks	Fr
TE	82	Ezra Burgess	So
WR	84	Reed Linder	Jr
WR	85	TJ Starks	Fr
TE	86	AJ Carlson	Fr
TE	87	Tyler Little	Jr
TE	88	Andrew Staten	Fr
QB		Jerry Horne	Fr

Defense

Pos.	#	Name	Class
CB	0	Trenton Yowe	Sr
CB	1	Braden Jackson	So
LB	2	Chris Pearson	Jr
DE	3	Javante Mackey	Jr
DE	4	Bryan Whitehead	Sr
LB	5	Terry Kirksey	Sr
S	6	AG McGhee	Sr
CB	7	Courtney Patterson	Fr
S	8	Brandon Barnes	So
CB	9	Avante Dickerson	Sr
DE	10	Demarcus Hendricks	Sr
DE	11	Drew Collins	Fr
DE	12	Marcus Bradley	Sr
CB	13	Kyle Williams	Fr
CB	14	DJ Watkins	Fr
S	15	Brandon Greil	Jr
S	16	BJ Wagner	Sr
DT	17	Chris Boti	Sr
S	18	Malekhi Weedon	Fr
CB	19	James Reed III	Jr
LB	20	Kyle Taylor	Sr
S	21	Malik McConico	Jr
LB	22	Nigel Nelson	Fr
CB	23	Cedric Franklin	Fr
CB	24	Josh Stone	Fr
LB	25	Aaron Alexander	Jr
LB	26	Kemari Nix	Fr
DE	27	Noland Asberry	Sr
LB	28	Daniel Demery	So
CB	29	Luke Wisham	Fr
LB	30	Andrew Agapos	Sr
LB	31	Devyn Curtis	Sr
DL	32	Ethan Hassler	Sr
S	33	TJ Hill	Fr
CB	34	Marquis Williams	Fr
S	36	Demarcus Baker	Fr
S	38	Joe Drew	Fr
LB	41	Aidan Wright	Fr
DE	42	Shaun Williams	Fr
LB	43	Chase Bogle	Fr
LB	44	Jordan Sample	So
LB	45	Nick Miller	Fr
DT	47	Lucas Banks	Sr
LB	51	Coleman Parmer	Fr
DE	52	Gideon Herbert	Fr
DT	54	Ryan Reese	Fr
DT	75	Landon Canady	Fr
DE	90	Lincoln Stueve	Fr
DT	92	Odi Udom	Fr
DT	93	Gavin Ransaw	Sr
DT	94	Cody Sigler	Jr
DE	96	Ronnie Blossom	Fr
DE	97	Tony Carter	Fr
DT	97	Simeon Mitchell	Sr
DT	98	Alex Martin	Fr
DT	99	Quincy Wright	Jr

Special teams

Pos.	#	Name	Class
K	25	Clayton Amaya	So
P	29	Jackson Waller	Fr
DS	31	Xavier Ross	Fr
K	34	Clune Van Andel	Jr
K	39	Ethan Bowman	Fr
P	40	Jaxson Dunn	Fr
DS	41	Drew Nicolson	So
LS	42	Kyle Nill	Fr

Head coach

- Butch Jones (Ferris State)

Coordinators/assistant coaches

- Marquase Lovings (Mississippi State)
  Associate head coach / Running backs
- Keith Heckendorf (Nebraska)
  Offensive coordinator/qb
- Griffin McCarley (West Alabama)
  Defensive coordinator
- Kwame Agyeman (Oregon)
  Safeties
- Nick Grimes (Sam Houston State)
  Offensive line / Run game coordinator
- Alex Jones (Tennessee)
  Tight ends
- Larry Knight (Central Michigan)
  Defensive ends / Defensive run game coordinator
- Derrick Lett (Bowling Green State)
  Wide receivers
- Jalen Ortiz (Wyoming)
  Cornerbacks
- Rashad Pittman (Pittsburg State)
  Defensive tackles
- Dakota Tillman (Limestone)
  Special teams coordinator

Legend

- (C) Team captain
- (S) Suspended
- (I) Ineligible
- Injured
- Redshirt

Roster
Last update: 26 July 2025

== Schedule ==
Date	Time	Opponent	Site	TV	Result	Attendance
August 30	6:00 p.m.	Southeast Missouri State*	Centennial Bank Stadium; Jonesboro, AR	ESPN+	W 42–24	18,241
September 6	4:00 p.m.	at Arkansas*	War Memorial Stadium; Little Rock, AR	SECN+/ESPN+	L 14–56	54,224
September 13	3:00 p.m.	No. 14 Iowa State*	Centennial Bank Stadium; Jonesboro, AR	ESPN2	L 16–24	22,348
September 20	5:00 p.m.	at Kennesaw State*	Fifth Third Stadium; Kennesaw, GA	ESPN+	L 21–28	10,713
September 27	2:00 p.m.	at Louisiana–Monroe	Malone Stadium; Monroe, LA	ESPN+	L 16–28	21,147
October 4	3:00 p.m.	Texas State	Centennial Bank Stadium; Jonesboro, AR	ESPNU	W 31–30	15,841
October 14	6:30 p.m.	at South Alabama	Hancock Whitney Stadium; Mobile, AL	ESPN2	W 15–14	19,634
October 25	6:00 p.m.	Georgia Southern^{†}	Centennial Bank Stadium; Jonesboro, AR	ESPN+	W 34–24	16,341
November 1	7:00 p.m.	at Troy	Veterans Memorial Stadium; Troy, AL	ESPNU	W 23–10	23,391
November 8	11:00 a.m.	Southern Miss	Centennial Bank Stadium; Jonesboro, AR	ESPNU	L 21–27	15,441
November 20	6:30 p.m.	Louisiana	Centennial Bank Stadium; Jonesboro, AR	ESPN	L 30–34	13,571
November 29	2:30 p.m.	at Appalachian State	Kidd Brewer Stadium; Boone, NC	ESPN+	W 30–29	23,876
December 18	8:00 p.m.	vs. Missouri State*	Ford Center at The Star; Frisco, TX (Xbox Bowl)	ESPN2	W 34–28	7,782
*Non-conference game; ^{†}Homecoming; Rankings from AP Poll and CFP Rankings released prior to game; All times are in Central time

== Game summaries ==
=== Southeast Missouri State (FCS) ===
Southeast Missouri State Redhawks (FCS) (0–0) at Arkansas State Red Wolves (0–0) – Game summary

Quarter	1	2	3	4	Total
Redhawks (FCS)	7	3	0	14	24
Red Wolves	7	21	7	7	42

at Centennial Bank Stadium • Jonesboro, AR

- Date: August 30
- Game time: 6:00 p.m. CDT
- Game weather: Sunny • Temperature: 86 °F (30 °C) • Wind: SE at 7 miles per hour (11 km/h)
- Game attendance: 18,241
- Referee: Marshall Lewis
- TV announcers (ESPN+): Graham Doty (play-by-play), Pete Cordelli (analyst), and Darrell Greene (sideline reporter)

Game information

First quarter

- (13:05) ARST – Ja'Quez Cross 7-yard run, Clune Van Andel kick (Drive: 7 plays, 75 yards, 1:55; Arkansas State 7–0)
- (9:18) SEMO – Brandon Epton Jr. 8-yard run, Justin Keller kick (Drive: 10 plays, 75 yards, 3:47; Tied 7–7)

Second quarter

- (14:03) SEMO – Justin Keller 40-yard field goal (Drive: 19 plays, 68 yards, 8:10; Southeast Missouri State 10–7)
- (10:13) ARST – Ja'Quez Cross 4-yard pass from Jaylen Raynor, Clune Van Andel kick (Drive: 9 plays, 65 yards, 3:50; Arkansas State 14–10)
- (9:05) ARST – Devin Spencer 43-yard run, Clune Van Andel kick (Drive: 2 plays, 43 yards, 0:14; Arkansas State 21–10)
- (0:35) ARST – Kenyon Clay 2-yard run, Clune Van Andel kick (Drive: 11 plays, 72 yards, 3:13; Arkansas State 28–10)

Third quarter

- (12:28) ARST – Corey Rucker 9-yard pass from Jaylen Raynor, Clune Van Andel kick (Drive: 3 plays, 64 yards, 1:17; Arkansas State 35–10)

Fourth quarter

- (8:56) ARST – Jaylen Bonelli 10-yard pass from Jaylen Raynor, Clune Van Andel kick (Drive: 10 plays, 68 yards, 5:20; Arkansas State 42–10)
- (7:51) SEMO – Donnie Cheers 60-yard pass from Jax Leatherwood, Justin Keller kick (Drive: 4 plays, 75 yards, 1:05; Arkansas State 42–17)
- (1:23) SEMO – Cam Pedro 31-yard pass from Jax Leatherwood, Justin Keller kick (Drive: 7 plays, 82 yards, 2:20; Arkansas State 42–24)

Statistics	SEMO	ARST
First downs	20	25
Plays–yards	69–364	68–492
Rushes–yards	33–92	36–147
Passing yards	272	345
Passing: Comp–Att–Int	26–36–0	26–32–0
Turnovers	1	1
Time of possession	29:08	30:52

Team	Category	Player	Statistics
Southeast Missouri State	Passing	Jax Leatherwood	26/36, 272 yards, 2 TD
Southeast Missouri State	Rushing	Brandon Epton Jr.	14 carries, 61 yards, TD
Southeast Missouri State	Receiving	Donnie Cheers	4 receptions, 96 yards, TD
Arkansas State	Passing	Jaylen Raynor	26/32, 345 yards, 3 TD
Arkansas State	Rushing	Devin Spencer	3 carries, 42 yards, TD
Arkansas State	Receiving	Chauncy Cobb	5 receptions, 85 yards

=== at Arkansas ===
Arkansas State Red Wolves (1–0) at Arkansas Razorbacks (1–0) – Game summary

Quarter	1	2	3	4	Total
Red Wolves	7	7	0	0	14
Razorbacks	28	7	14	7	56

at War Memorial Stadium • Little Rock, AR

- Date: September 6, 2025
- Game time: 4:00 PM CDT
- Game weather: Cloudy • Temperature: 71 °F (22 °C) • Wind: NE at 7 miles per hour (11 km/h)
- Game attendance: 54,224
- Referee: James Carter
- TV announcers (SECN+/ESPN+): Richard Cross (play-by-play) and Taylor McHargue (analyst)

Game information

First quarter

- (14:21) ARK – Mike Washington Jr. 53-yard run, Scott Starzyk kick (Drive: 2 plays, 75 yards, 0:39; Arkansas 7–0)
- (10:03) ARK – Raylen Sharpe 37-yard pass from Taylen Green, Scott Starzyk kick (Drive: 6 plays, 80 yards, 2:24; Arkansas 14–0)
- (9:50) ARST – Chauncy Cobb 98-yard kickoff return, Clune Van Andel kick (Arkansas 14–7)
- (8:59) ARK – Taylen Green 64-yard run, Scott Starzyk kick (Drive: 2 plays, 75 yards, 0:51; Arkansas 21–7)
- (5:05) ARK – Braylen Russell 7-yard run, Scott Starzyk kick (Drive: 4 plays, 50 yards, 1:55; Arkansas 28–7)

Second quarter

- (3:44) ARST – Cameron Ambrose 2-yard pass from Jaylen Raynor, Clune Van Andel kick (Drive: 14 plays, 62 yards, 6:46; Arkansas 28–14)
- (0:53) ARK – Jalen Brown 8-yard pass from Taylen Green, Scott Starzyk kick (Drive: 12 plays, 83 yards, 2:51; Arkansas 35–14)

Third quarter

- (11:20) ARK – Rohan Jones 33-yard pass from Taylen Green, Scott Starzyk kick (Drive: 5 plays, 70 yards, 2:10; Arkansas 42–14)
- (3:46) ARK – O'Mega Blake 14-yard pass from Taylen Green, Scott Starzyk kick (Drive: 11 plays, 86 yards, 4:32; Arkansas 49–14)

Fourth quarter

- (6:16) ARK – KJ Jackson 6-yard run, Scott Starzyk kick (Drive: 8 plays, 99 yards, 4:16; Arkansas 56–14)

Statistics	ARST	ARK
First downs	23	29
Plays–yards	78–285	58–630
Rushes–yards	42–153	29–321
Passing yards	132	309
Passing: comp–att–int	22–36–2	20–29–2
Turnovers	2	2
Time of possession	37:10	22:50

Team	Category	Player	Statistics
Arkansas State	Passing	Jaylen Raynor	21/33, 125 yards, TD, 2 INT
Arkansas State	Rushing	Jaylen Raynor	15 carries, 38 yards
Arkansas State	Receiving	Chauncy Cobb	4 receptions, 50 yards
Arkansas	Passing	Taylen Green	17/26, 239 yards, 4 TD, 2 INT
Arkansas	Rushing	Taylen Green	9 carries, 151 yards, TD
Arkansas	Receiving	Rohan Jones	2 receptions, 74 yards, TD

=== No. 14 Iowa State ===
No. 14 Iowa State Cyclones (3–0) at Arkansas State Red Wolves (1–1) – Game summary

Quarter	1	2	3	4	Total
No. 14 Cyclones	9	8	0	7	24
Red Wolves	0	10	3	3	16

at Centennial Bank Stadium • Jonesboro, AR

- Date: September 13, 2025
- Game time: 3:00 PM CDT
- Game weather: Sunny • Temperature: 92 °F (33 °C) • Wind: SW at 7 mph (11 km/h)
- Game attendance: 22,348
- Referee: Cravonne Barrett
- TV announcers (ESPN2): Mike Monaco (play-by-play), Kirk Morrison (analyst), and Dawn Davenport (sideline reporter)

Game information

First Quarter

- (9:07) ISU – Kyle Konrardy 41-yard field goal (Drive: 10 plays, 52 yards, 4:10; Iowa State 3–0)
- (2:42) ISU – Rocco Becht 10-yard run, Kyle Konrardy PAT failed (Drive: 7 play, 91 yards, 3:58; Iowa State 9–0)

Second Quarter

- (13:11) ARST – Clune Van Andel 45-yard field goal (Drive: 8 plays, 55 yards, 4:18; Iowa State 9–3)
- (0:39) ARST – Jaylen Raynor 3-yard rush, Clune Van Andel kick (Drive: 17 plays, 70 yards, 8:13; Arkansas State 10–9)
- (0:11) ISU – Dominic Overby 27-yard pass from Rocco Becht, Carson Hansen two-point conversion pass from Rocco Becht (Drive: 5 plays, 75 yards, 0:28; Iowa State 17–10)

Third Quarter

- (9:08) ARST – Clune Van Andel 36-yard field goal (Drive: 14 plays, 50 yards, 5:48; Iowa State 17–13)

Fourth Quarter

- (11:53) ARST – Clune Van Andel 40-yard field goal (Drive: 18 plays, 85 yards, 6:27; Iowa State 17–16)
- (8:34) ISU – Abu Sama III 4-yard run, Chase Smith kick (Drive: 9 plays, 75 yards, 3:19; Iowa State 24–16)

Statistics	ISU	ARST
First downs	20	20
Plays–yards	59–452	73–382
Rushes–yards	34–187	40–160
Passing yards	265	222
Passing: comp–att–int	14–25–1	19–33–1
Turnovers	1	1
Time of possession	25:19	34:41

Team	Category	Player	Statistics
Iowa State	Passing	Rocco Becht	14/25, 265 yards, TD, INT
Iowa State	Rushing	Carson Hansen	18 carries, 116 yards
Iowa State	Receiving	Xavier Townsend	3 receptions, 92 yards
Arkansas State	Passing	Jaylen Raynor	19/33, 222 yards, INT
Arkansas State	Rushing	Jaylen Raynor	16 carries, 83 yards, TD
Arkansas State	Receiving	Chauncey Cobb	7 receptions, 81 yards

=== at Kennesaw State ===
Arkansas State Red Wolves (1–2) at Kennesaw State Owls (1–2) – Game summary

Quarter	1	2	3	4	Total
Red Wolves	0	7	7	7	21
Owls	21	0	7	0	28

at Fifth Third Stadium • Kennesaw, GA

- Date: September 20, 2025
- Game time: 6:00 PM EDT
- Game weather: Sunny • Temperature: 86 °F (30 °C)
- Game attendance: 10,713
- Referee: Douglas Mercer
- TV announcers (ESPN+): Nolan Alexander (play-by-play), Caleb O'Neal (analyst) and Maria Martin (sideline)

Game information

First quarter

- KENN – Gabriel Benyard 54-yard pass from Amari Odom (Britton Williams kick), 12:32. Owls 7–0. Drive: 5 plays, 75 yards, 1:37.
- KENN – Alexander Diggs 7-yard run (Britton Williams kick), 8:49. Owls 14–0. Drive: 6 plays, 38 yards, 2:31.
- KENN – Amari Odom 14-yard run (Britton Williams kick), 5:10. Owls 21–0. Drive: 8 plays, 82 yards, 2:44.

Second quarter

- ARST – Hunter Summers 28-yard pass from Jaylen Raynor (Clune Van Andel kick), 0:02. Owls 21–7. Drive: 6 plays, 71 yards, 0:51.

Third quarter

- ARST – Jaylen Raynor 1-yard run (Clune Van Andel kick), 12:03. Owls 21–14. Drive: 3 plays, 49 yards, 1:37.
- KENN – Coleman Bennett 10-yard run (Britton Williams kick), 8:36. Owls 28–14. Drive: 8 plays, 56 yards, 3:21.

Fourth quarter

- ARST – Kenyon Clay 6-yard pass from Jaylen Raynor (Clune Van Andel kick), 10:04. Owls 28–21. Drive: 16 plays, 72 yards, 5:38.

Statistics	ARST	KENN
First downs	18	30
Plays–yards	69–318	83–497
Rushes–yards	28–92	49–189
Passing yards	226	308
Passing: Comp–Att–Int	25–41–0	25–34–0
Turnovers	1	3
Time of possession	26:35	33:25

Team	Category	Player	Statistics
Arkansas State	Passing	Jaylen Raynor	25/41, 226 yards, 2 TD
Arkansas State	Rushing	Devin Spencer	14 carries, 61 yards
Arkansas State	Receiving	Hunter Summers	8 receptions, 114 yards, TD
Kennesaw State	Passing	Amari Odom	25/34, 308 yards, TD
Kennesaw State	Rushing	Amari Odom	16 carries, 101 yards, TD
Kennesaw State	Receiving	Gabriel Benyard	6 receptions, 114 yards, TD

=== at Louisiana–Monroe ===
Arkansas State Red Wolves (1–3) at Louisiana–Monroe Warhawks (2–1) – Game summary

Quarter	1	2	3	4	Total
Red Wolves	10	0	3	3	16
Warhawks	0	14	7	7	28

at Malone Stadium • Monroe, LA

- Date: September 27, 2025
- Game time: 2:00 p.m. CDT
- Game weather: Sunny • Temperature: 85 °F (29 °C) • Wind: N at 12 mph
- Game attendance: 21,147
- Referee: Trennis Livingston
- TV announcers (ESPN+): Sean Fox (play-by-play) and Desmund Lighten (analyst)

Game information

First quarter

- (13:34) ARST – Brandon Greil 32-yard interception return, Clune Van Andel kick (Drive: 3 plays, 75 yards, 1:26; Arkansas State 7–0)
- (2:35) ARST – Clune Van Andel 51-yard field goal (Drive: 8 plays, 30 yards, 2:16; Arkansas State 10–0)

Second quarter

- (6:28) ULM – Julian Nixon 8-yard pass from Aidan Armenta, Luke Stagg kick (Drive: 12 plays, 92 yards, 6:00; Arkansas State 10–7)
- (0:46) ULM – Jake Godfrey 37-yard pass from Aidan Armenta, Luke Stagg kick (Drive: 6 plays, 64 yards, 2:08; Louisiana–Monroe 14–10)

Third quarter

- (9:57) ULM – Braylon McReynolds 18-yard run, Luke Stagg kick (Drive: 4 plays, 45 yards, 2:21; Louisiana–Monroe 21–10)
- (5:44) ARST – Clune Van Andel 43-yard field goal (Drive: 12 plays, 25 yards, 4:05; Louisiana–Monroe 21–13)

Fourth quarter

- (12:09) ARST – Clune Van Andel 30-yard field goal (Drive: 14 plays, 53 yards, 6:08; Louisiana–Monroe 21–16)
- (5:36) ULM – Zach Palmer-Smith 2-yard run, Luke Stagg kick (Drive: 9 plays, 75 yards, 6:33; Louisiana–Monroe 28–16)

Statistics	ARST	ULM
First downs	22	18
Plays–yards	74–297	58–384
Rushes–yards	27–12	32–199
Passing yards	285	185
Passing: Comp–Att–Int	30–47–1	17–26–1
Turnovers	2	1
Time of possession	29:39	30:21

Team	Category	Player	Statistics
Arkansas State	Passing	Jaylen Raynor	30/47, 285 yards, INT
Arkansas State	Rushing	Devin Spencer	7 carries, 23 yards
Arkansas State	Receiving	Chauncey Cobb	8 receptions, 126 yards
Louisiana–Monroe	Passing	Aidan Armenta	17/26, 185 yards, 2 TD, INT
Louisiana–Monroe	Rushing	Zach Palmer-Smith	8 carries, 84 yards, TD
Louisiana–Monroe	Receiving	Jake Godfrey	2 receptions, 40 yards, TD

=== Texas State ===
Texas State Bobcats (3–1) at Arkansas State Red Wolves (1–4) – Game summary

Quarter	1	2	3	4	Total
Bobcats	7	3	0	20	30
Red Wolves	7	3	0	21	31

at Centennial Bank Stadium • Jonesboro, AR

- Date: October 4, 2025
- Game time: 3:00 p.m. CDT
- Game weather: Sunny • Temperature: 83 °F (28 °C) • Wind: SE at 10 mph
- Game attendance: 15,841
- Referee: Jeremy Parker
- TV announcers (ESPNU): Chuckie Kempf (play-by-play) and Darius Walker (analyst)

Game information

First quarter

- (13:01) TXST – Brad Jackson 24-yard run, Tyler Robles kick (Drive: 7 plays, 75 yards, 1:59; Arkansas State 7–0)
- (2:04) ARST – Jaylen Raynor 13-yard run, Clune Van Andel kick (Drive: 7 plays, 80 yards, 1:58; Tied 7–7)

Second quarter

- (10:29) ARST – Clune Van Andel 51-yard field goal (Drive: 6 plays, 21 yards, 3:06; Arkansas State 10–7)
- (5:48) TXST – Tyler Robles 31-yard field goal (Drive: 12 plays, 75 yards, 4:41; Tied 10–10)

Third quarter

- No scoring plays.

Fourth quarter

- (12:05) TXST – Titus Lyons 13-yard pass from Brad Jackson, Tyler Robles kick (Drive: 9 plays, 89 yards, 3:01; Texas State 17–10)
- (6:40) ARST – Hunter Summers 5-yard pass from Jaylen Raynor, Clune Van Andel kick (Drive: 11 plays, 75 yards, 5:25; Tied 17–17)
- (3:45) TXST – Lincoln Pare 6-yard run, Tyler Robles kick (Drive: 7 plays, 75 yards, 2:55; Texas State 24–17)
- (1:20) ARST – Kenyon Clay 5-yard pass from Jaylen Raynor, Clune Van Andel kick (Drive: 9 plays, 80 yards, 2:20; Tied 24–24)
- (1:00) TXST – Lincoln Pare 3-yard run, Tyler Robles PAT failed (Drive: 2 plays, 66 yards, 0:15; Texas State 30–24)
- (0:07) ARST – Jaylen Raynor 4-yard run, Clune Van Andel kick (Drive: 6 plays, 75 yards, 0:53; Arkansas State 31–30)

Statistics	TXST	ARST
First downs	23	22
Plays–yards	72–521	69–398
Rushes–yards	46–289	34–150
Passing yards	232	248
Passing: comp–att–int	18–26–0	27–35–0
Turnovers	0	0
Time of possession	30:13	29:47

Team	Category	Player	Statistics
Texas State	Passing	Brad Jackson	18/26, 230 yards, TD
Texas State	Rushing	Brad Jackson	10 carries, 131 yards, TD
Texas State	Receiving	Beau Sparks	3 receptions, 58 yards
Arkansas State	Passing	Jaylen Raynor	27/35, 248 yards, 2 TD
Arkansas State	Rushing	Jaylen Raynor	19 carries, 92 yards, 2 TD
Arkansas State	Receiving	Corey Rucker	8 receptions, 102 yards

=== at South Alabama ===
Arkansas State Red Wolves (2–4) at South Alabama Jaguars (1–5) – Game summary

Quarter	1	2	3	4	Total
Red Wolves	0	3	0	12	15
Jaguars	7	0	7	0	14

at Hancock Whitney Stadium • Mobile, AL

- Date: October 14, 2025
- Game time: 6:30 p.m. CDT
- Game weather: Clear • Temperature: 78 °F (26 °C) • Wind: S 7 mph
- Game attendance: 19,634
- Referee: Tim Barker
- TV announcers (ESPN2): Matt Schumacker (play-by-play) and Dustin Fox (analyst)

Game information

First quarter

- (2:50) USA – Kentrel Bullock 9-yard run, Hamilton DiBoyan kick (Drive: 9 plays, 75 yards, 4:21; South Alabama 7–0)

Second quarter

- (12:02) ARST – Clune Van Andel 25-yard field goal (Drive: 7 plays, 38 yards, 2:15; South Alabama 7–3)

Third quarter

- (1:34) USA – PJ Martin 27-yard run, Hamilton DiBoyan kick (Drive: 5 plays, 58 yards, 1:50; South Alabama 14–3)

Fourth quarter

- (10:43) ARST – Clune Van Andel 37-yard field goal (Drive: 14 plays, 56 yards, 5:45; South Alabama 14–6)
- (7:51) ARST – Hunter Summers 6-yard pass from Jaylen Raynor (Drive: 2 plays, 48 yards, 0:40; South Alabama 14–12)
- (0:00) ARST – Clune Van Andel 38-yard field goal (Drive: 10 plays, 60 yards, 1:50; Arkansas State 15–14)

Statistics	ARST	USA
First downs	21	15
Plays–yards	77–367	59–278
Rushes–yards	32–158	36–160
Passing yards	209	118
Passing: Comp–Att–Int	29–45–1	18–23–0
Turnovers	1	0
Time of possession	29:56	30:04

Team	Category	Player	Statistics
Arkansas State	Passing	Jaylen Raynor	29/45, 209 yards, TD, INT
Arkansas State	Rushing	Jaylen Raynor	14 carries, 76 yards
Arkansas State	Receiving	Chauncy Cobb	6 receptions, 68 yards
South Alabama	Passing	Bishop Davenport	18/23, 118 yards
South Alabama	Rushing	Kentrel Bullock	16 carries, 72 yards, TD
South Alabama	Receiving	Devin Voisin	4 receptions, 43 yards

=== Georgia Southern ===
Georgia Southern Eagles (3–4) at Arkansas State Red Wolves (3–4) – Game summary

Quarter	1	2	3	4	Total
Eagles	14	7	0	3	24
Red Wolves	7	10	7	10	34

at Centennial Bank Stadium • Jonesboro, AR

- Date: October 25, 2025
- Game time: 6:00 p.m. CDT
- Game weather: Cloudy • Temperature: 68 °F (20 °C) • Wind: SE at 7 mph
- Game attendance: 16,341
- Referee: Steven Robinson
- TV announcers (ESPN+): Graham Doty (play-by-play), Pete Cordelli (analyst) and Darrell Greene (sideline)

Game information

First quarter

- (12:08) GASO - Camden Brown 24-yard pass from JC French IV, Tripp Bryant kick (Drive: 7 plays, 65 yards, 2:47; Georgia Southern 7-0)
- (4:10) GASO - Marcus Sanders Jr. 18-yard pass from JC French IV, Tripp Bryant kick (Drive: 10 plays, 98 yards, 4:03; Georgia Southern 14-0)
- (2:29) ARST - Kenyon Clay 1-yard run, Clune Van Andel kick (Drive: 5 plays, 75 yards, 1:41; Georgia Southern 14-7)

Second quarter

- (13:24) ARST - Clune Van Andel 24-yard field goal (Drive: 8 plays, 39 yards, 2;10; Georgia Southern 14-10)
- (6:59) GASO - JC French IV 5-yard pass, Tripp Bryant kick (Drive: 5 plays, 32 yards, 2:12; Georgia Southern 21-10)
- (0:09) ARST - Jaylen Raynor 2-yard run, Clune Van Andel kick (Drive: 14 plays, 91 yards, 3:25; Georgia Southern 21-17)

Third quarter

- (9:38) ARST - Jaylen Raynor 8-yard run, Clune Van Andel kick (Drive: 13 plays, 77 yards, 5:18; Arkansas State 24-21)

Fourth quarter

- (9:47) ARST - Jaylen Raynor 2-yard run, Clune Van Andel kick (Drive: 11 plays, 78 yards, 3:18; Arkansas State 31-21)
- (1:56) GASO - Tripp Bryant 21-yard field goal (Drive: 14 plays, 81 yards, 7:46; Arkansas State 31-24)
- (0:41) ARST - Clune Van Andel 27-yard field goal (Drive: 5 plays, 36 yards, 1:13; Arkansas State 34-24)

Statistics	GASO	ARST
First downs	22	29
Plays–yards	66–336	85–482
Rushes–yards	41–128	48–266
Passing yards	208	216
Passing: Comp–Att–Int	18-25-0	24-37-1
Turnovers	0	2
Time of possession	31:43	28:17

Team	Category	Player	Statistics
Georgia Southern	Passing	JC French IV	18/24, 208 yards, 2 TD
Georgia Southern	Rushing	OJ Arnold	14 carries, 73 yards
Georgia Southern	Receiving	Camden Brown	5 receptions, 44 yards, TD
Arkansas State	Passing	Jaylen Raynor	24/37, 216 yards, 1 INT
Arkansas State	Rushing	Kenyon Clay	17 carries, 124 yards, TD
Arkansas State	Receiving	Chauncy Cobb	12 receptions, 81 yards

=== at Troy ===
Arkansas State Red Wolves (4–4) at Troy Trojans (6–2) – Game summary

Quarter	1	2	3	4	Total
Red Wolves	17	0	3	3	23
Trojans	0	3	0	7	10

at Veterans Memorial Stadium • Troy, AL

- Date: November 1, 2025
- Game time: 7:00 p.m. CDT
- Game weather: Clear • Temperature: 54 °F (12 °C) • Wind: 1 mph
- Game attendance: 23,391
- Referee: Trennis Livingston
- TV announcers (ESPNU): Mike Corey (play-by-play) and Tyoka Jackson (analyst)

Game information

First quarter

- (9:23) ARST – Tyler Fortenberry 4-yard pass from Jaylen Raynor, Clune Van Andel kick (Drive: 7 plays, 80 yards, 3:13; Arkansas State 7–0)
- (8:18) ARST – Hunter Summers 19-yard pass from Jaylen Raynor, Clune Van Andel kick (Drive: 3 plays, 29 yards, 1:00; Arkansas State 14–0)
- (2:58) ARST – Clune Van Andel 30-yard field goal (Drive: 9 plays, 48 yards, 3:40; Arkansas State 17–0)

Second quarter

- (0:21) TROY – Scott Taylor Renfroe 43-yard field goal (Drive: 8 plays, 10 yards, 2:58; Arkansas State 17–3)

Third quarter

- (9:21) ARST – Clune Van Andel 31-yard field goal (Drive: 14 plays, 61 yards, 5:39; Arkansas State 20–3)

Fourth quarter

- (13:02) TROY – Tucker Kilcrease 1-yard run, Scott Taylor Renfroe kick (Drive: 7 plays, 45 yards, 3:24; Arkansas State 20–10)
- (3:38) ARST – Clune Van Andel 53-yard field goal (Drive: 4 plays, 7 yards, 2:13; Arkansas State 23–10)

Statistics	ARST	TROY
First downs	16	11
Plays–yards	62–297	68–187
Rushes–yards	33–50	34–21
Passing yards	247	166
Passing: Comp–Att–Int	21–29–0	19–34–1
Turnovers	2	2
Time of possession	28:25	31:35

Team	Category	Player	Statistics
Arkansas State	Passing	Jaylen Raynor	21/29, 247 yards, 2 TD
Arkansas State	Rushing	Kenyon Clay	16 carries, 40 yards
Arkansas State	Receiving	Hunter Summers	4 receptions, 70 yards, TD
Troy	Passing	Tucker Kilcrease	19/34, 166 yards, INT
Troy	Rushing	Tae Meadows	14 carries, 48 yards
Troy	Receiving	Tray Taylor	2 receptions, 56 yards

=== Southern Miss ===
Southern Miss Golden Eagles (6-2) at Arkansas State Red Wolves (5-4) – Game summary

Quarter	1	2	3	4	Total
Golden Eagles	10	7	3	7	27
Red Wolves	7	0	0	14	21

at Centennial Bank Stadium • Jonesboro, AR

- Date: November 8, 2025
- Game time: 11:00 AM CST
- Game weather: Sunny • Temperature: 71 °F (22 °C) • Wind: NE 2 mph
- Game attendance: 15,441
- Referee: Scott Broadway
- TV announcers (ESPNU): Lowell Galindo (play-by-play), Aaron Murray (analyst), and Lauren Sisler (sideline)

Game information

First quarter

- (13:17) USM – Creighton Wilbanks 28-yard field goal (Drive: 5 plays, 15 yards, 1:36; Southern Miss 3–0)
- (11:02) ARST – Kenyon Clay 5-yard pass from Jaylen Raynor, Clune Van Andel kick (Drive: 6 plays, 75 yards, 2:15; Arkansas State 7–3)
- (3:43) USM – Landry Lyddy 7-yard run, Creighton Wilbanks kick (Drive: 5 plays, 55 yards, 1:56; Southern Miss 10–7)

Second quarter

- (14:04) USM – Elijah Metcalf 76-yard pass from Landry Lyddy, Creighton Wilbanks kick (Drive: 1 play, 76 yards, 0:12; Southern Miss 17–7)

Third quarter

- (2:05) USM – Creighton Wilbanks 37-yard field goal (Drive: 9 plays, 61 yards, 3:46; Southern Miss 20–7)

Fourth quarter

- (13:08) ARST – Tyler Little 6-yard pass from Josh Flowers, Clune Van Andel kick (Drive: 11 plays, 75 yards, 3:57; Southern Miss 20–14)
- (9:15) USM – Kyirin Heath 15-yard pass from Braylon Braxton, Creighton Wilbanks kick (Drive: 10 plays, 66 yards, 3:53; Southern Miss 27–14)
- (3:15) ARST – Jaylen Bonelli 3-yard pass from Jaylen Raynor, Clune Van Andel kick (Drive: 7 plays, 59 yards, 2:19; Southern Miss 27–21)

Statistics	USM	ARST
First downs	22	28
Plays–yards	77–528	87–456
Rushes–yards	42–172	34–119
Passing yards	356	337
Passing: Comp–Att–Int	24–35–2	38–53–5
Turnovers	2	6
Time of possession	29:45	30:15

Team	Category	Player	Statistics
Southern Miss	Passing	Braylon Braxton	20/29, 228 yards, TD, INT
Southern Miss	Rushing	Jeffery Pittman	18 carries, 75 yards
Southern Miss	Receiving	Elijah Metcalf	5 receptions, 143 yards, TD
Arkansas State	Passing	Jaylen Raynor	37/48, 331 yards, 2 TD, 4 INT
Arkansas State	Rushing	Devin Spencer	11 carries, 47 yards
Arkansas State	Receiving	Corey Rucker	7 receptions, 123 yards

=== Louisiana ===
Louisiana Ragin' Cajuns (4–6) at Arkansas State Red Wolves (5–5) – Game summary

Quarter	1	2	3	4	Total
Ragin' Cajuns	7	17	7	3	34
Red Wolves	10	17	0	3	30

at Centennial Bank Stadium • Jonesboro, AR

- Date: November 20, 2025
- Game time: 6:30 PM CST
- Game weather: Patchy clouds • Temperature: 59 °F (15 °C) • Wind: SE at 4 mph (6.4 km/h)
- Game attendance: 13,571
- Referee: Trennis Livingston
- TV announcers (ESPN): Matt Barrie (play-by-play), Tom Luginbill (analyst) and Harry Lyles Jr. (sideline)

Game information

First quarter

- (9:11) ARST – Clune Van Andel 21-yard field goal (Drive: 5 plays, 33 yards, 1:29; Arkansas State 3–0)
- (7:50) ARST – Cody Sigler 27-yard fumble return, Clune Van Andel kick (Drive: 3 plays, 17 yards, 1:15; Arkansas State 10–0)
- (3:40) LA – Zylan Perry 1-yard run, Tony Sterner kick (Drive: 4 plays, 18 yards, 1:52; Arkansas State 10–7)

Second quarter

- (14:44) LA – Lunch Winfield 1-yard run, Tony Sterner kick (Drive: 9 plays, 35 yards, 3:42; Louisiana 14–10)
- (10:23) ARST – Clune Van Andel 41-yard field goal (Drive: 11 plays, 60 yards, 4:16; Louisiana 14–13)
- (6:57) LA – Tony Sterner 41-yard field goal (Drive: 8 plays, 41 yards, 3:26; Louisiana 17–13)
- (6:45) ARST – Chauncy Cobb 93-yard kickoff returned, Clune Van Andel kick (Drive: 0 plays, 0 yards, 0:00; Arkansas State 20–17)
- (3:38) LA – Lunch Winfield 1-yard run, Tony Sterner kick (Drive: 6 plays, 33 yards, 2:54; Louisiana 24–20)
- (0:53) ARST – Devin Spencer 1-yard run, Clune Van Andel kick (Drive: 11 plays, 75 yards, 2:40; Arkansas State 27–24)

Third quarter

- (6:29) LA – Bill Davis 36-yard run, Tony Sterner kick (Drive: 10 plays, 85 yards, 4:17; Louisiana 31–27)

Fourth quarter

- (13:35) LA – Tony Sterner 50-yard field goal (Drive: 10 plays, 42 yards, 4:55; Louisiana 34–27)
- (6:40) ARST – Clune Van Andel 24-yard field goal (Drive: 15 plays, 69 yards, 6:55; Louisiana 34–30)

Statistics	LA	ARST
First downs	16	24
Plays–yards	71–349	78–394
Rushes–yards	46–202	35–138
Passing yards	147	256
Passing: Comp–Att–Int	18–25–0	25–43–0
Turnovers	1	2
Time of possession	33:59	26:01

Team	Category	Player	Statistics
Louisiana	Passing	Lunch Winfield	18/25, 147 yards
Louisiana	Rushing	Lunch Winfield	20 carries, 89 yards, 2 TD
Louisiana	Receiving	Shelton Sampson Jr.	3 receptions, 35 yards
Arkansas State	Passing	Jaylen Raynor	25/43, 256 yards
Arkansas State	Rushing	Devin Spencer	16 carries, 71 yards, TD
Arkansas State	Receiving	Corey Rucker	8 receptions, 120 yards

=== at Appalachian State ===
Arkansas State Red Wolves (5-6) at Appalachian State Mountaineers (5-6) – Game summary

Quarter	1	2	3	4	Total
Red Wolves	3	13	7	7	30
Mountaineers	3	13	7	6	29

at Kidd Brewer Stadium • Boone, NC

- Date: November 29, 2025
- Game time: 1:30 p.m. CST
- Game weather: Cloudy • Temperature: 34 °F (1 °C) • Wind: N 7 mph
- Game attendance: 23,876
- Referee: Tim Barker
- TV announcers (ESPN+): David Jackson (play-by-play) and Avery Hall (analyst)

Game information

First quarter

- (11:15) APP – Dominic De Freitas 43-yard field goal (Drive: 10 plays, 50 yards, 3:45; Appalachian State 3–0)
- (2:36) ARST – Clune Van Andel 24-yard field goal (Drive: 9 plays, 42 yards, 4:21; Tied 3–3)

Second quarter

- (13:47) APP – Dominic De Freitas 38-yard field goal (Drive: 10 plays, 59 yards, 3:45; Appalachian State 6–3)
- (9:44) APP – Dalton Stroman 37-yard pass from JJ Kohl, Dominic De Freitas kick (Drive: 2 plays, 37 yards, 0:39; Appalachian State 13–3)
- (1:33) ARST – Corey Rucker 8-yard pass from Jaylen Raynor, Clune Van Andel PAT failed (Drive: 8 plays, 71 yards, 2:25; Appalachian State 13–9)
- (1:16) ARST – Tyler Fortenberry 13-yard pass from Jaylen Raynor, Clune Van Andel kick (Drive: 3 plays, 13 yards, 0:13; Arkansas State 16–13)
- (0:03) APP – Dominic De Freitas 45-yard field goal (Drive: 3 plays, 49 yards, 0:26; Tied 16–16)

Third quarter

- (7:34) APP – Sam Mbake 16-yard pass from JJ Kohl, Dominic De Freitas kick (Drive: 7 plays, 66 yards, 3:22; Appalachian State 23–16)
- (2:38) ARST – Corey Rucker 6-yard pass from Jaylen Raynor, Clune Van Andel kick (Drive: 12 plays, 75 yards, 4:56; Tied 23–23)

Fourth quarter

- (11:37) APP – Dominic De Freitas 48-yard field goal (Drive: 4 plays, 17 yards, 1:23; Appalachian State 26–23)
- (1:34) APP – Dominic De Freitas 29-yard field goal (Drive: 12 plays, 74 yards, 4:11; Appalachian State 29–23)
- (0:42) ARST – Kenyon Clay 1-yard run, Clune Van Andel kick (Drive: 7 plays, 75 yards, 0:52; Arkansas State 30–29)

Statistics	ARST	APP
First downs	23	23
Plays–yards	81–448	75–453
Rushes–yards	34–85	36–182
Passing yards	363	271
Passing: Comp–Att–Int	32-47-1	26-39-0
Turnovers	3	1
Time of possession	30:31	29:29

Team	Category	Player	Statistics
Arkansas State	Passing	Jaylen Raynor	32/47, 363 yards, 3 TD, INT
Arkansas State	Rushing	Kenyon Clay	14 carries, 52 yards, TD
Arkansas State	Receiving	Chauncey Cobb	5 receptions, 117 yards
Appalachian State	Passing	JJ Kohl	26/39, 271 yards, 2 TD
Appalachian State	Rushing	Jaquari Lewis	22 carries, 108 yards
Appalachian State	Receiving	David Larkins	6 receptions, 72 yards

=== vs. Missouri State (Xbox Bowl) ===
2025 Xbox Bowl
Missouri State Bears (7–5) vs Arkansas State Red Wolves (6–6) – Game summary

Quarter	1	2	3	4	Total
Bears	7	0	0	21	28
Red Wolves	14	10	7	3	34

at Ford Center at The Star • Frisco, TX

- Date: December 18, 2025
- Game time: 8:00 p.m. CDT
- Game weather: None (indoors)
- Game attendance: 7,782
- Referee: Kenneth Ray
- TV announcers (ESPN2): Jorge Sedano (play-by-play), Rodney McLeod (analyst) and Victoria Arlen (sideline)

Game information

First Quarter

- (10:59) ARST – Jaylen Bonelli 7-yard pass from Jaylen Raynor, Clune Van Andel kick (Drive: 5 plays, 55 yards, 2:08; Arkansas State 7–0)
- (2:51) ARST – Corey Rucker 71-yard pass from Jaylen Raynor, Clune Van Andel kick (Drive: 4 plays, 95 yards, 1:10; Arkansas State 14–0)
- (0:17) MOST – Dash Luke 39-yard pass from Jacob Clark, Yousef Obeid kick (Drive: 5 plays, 75 yards, 2:34; Arkansas State 14–7)

Second Quarter

- (12:40) ARST – Clune Van Andel 54-yard field goal (Drive: 9 plays, 28 yards, 2:37; Arkansas State 17–7)
- (6:14) ARST – Chauncey Cobb 4-yard pass from Jaylen Raynor, Clune Van Andel kick (Drive: 4 plays, 44 yards, 1:29; Arkansas State 24–7)

Third Quarter

- (10:22) ARST – Devin Spencer 25-yard run, Clune Van Andel kick (Drive: 5 plays, 65 yards, 1:51; Arkansas State 31–7)

Fourth Quarter

- (14:52) MOST – Ramone Green Jr. 15-yard pass from Jacob Clark, Jeron Askren two-point conversion pass from Jacob Clark (Drive: 12 plays, 90 yards, 6:48; Arkansas State 31–15)
- (12:44) ARST – Clune Van Andel 32-yard field goal (Drive: 6 plays, 56 yards, 2:03; Arkansas State 34–15)
- (5:26) MOST – Dash Luke 47-yard pass from Jacob Clark, two-point pass conversion attempt failed (Drive: 3 plays, 52 yards, 1:23; Arkansas State 34–21)
- (1:54) MOST – Jmariyae Robinson 16-yard pass from Jacob Clark, Yousef Obeid kick (Drive: 4 plays, 80 yards, 1:26; Arkansas State 34–28)

Statistics	MSU	ARST
First downs	23	16
Plays–yards	72–396	56–359
Rushes–yards	37–47	25–71
Passing yards	349	288
Passing: Comp–Att–Int	25–35–0	17–31–0
Turnovers	2	0
Time of possession	39:07	20:53

Team	Category	Player	Statistics
Missouri State	Passing	Jacob Clark	25/35, 349 yards, 4 TD
Missouri State	Rushing	Shomari Lawrence	16 carries, 57 yards
Missouri State	Receiving	Dash Luke	7 receptions, 169 yards, 2 TD
Arkansas State	Passing	Jaylen Raynor	17/31, 288 yards, 3 TD
Arkansas State	Rushing	Kenyon Clay	11 carries, 53 yards
Arkansas State	Receiving	Corey Rucker	6 receptions, 166 yards, TD
