= 2025 Iowa State Cyclones football team =

American college football season

2025 Iowa State Cyclones football
- Conference: Big 12 Conference
- Record: 8–4 (5–4 Big 12)
- Head coach: Matt Campbell (10th season)
- Offensive coordinator: Taylor Mouser (2nd season)
- Offensive scheme: Spread
- Defensive coordinator: Jon Heacock (10th season)
- Base defense: 3-high safety
- Home stadium: Jack Trice Stadium

2025 Big 12 Conference football standings
	Conf.			Overall
Team	W		L	W		L
No. 7 Texas Tech y$^	8	–	1	12	–	2
No. 11 BYU y	8	–	1	12	–	2
No. 14 Utah	7	–	2	11	–	2
No. 22 Houston	6	–	3	10	–	3
Arizona	6	–	3	9	–	4
Arizona State	6	–	3	8	–	5
No. 25 TCU	5	–	4	9	–	4
Iowa State	5	–	4	8	–	4
Cincinnati	5	–	4	7	–	6
Kansas State	5	–	4	6	–	6
Baylor	3	–	6	5	–	7
Kansas	3	–	6	5	–	7
UCF	2	–	7	5	–	7
West Virginia	2	–	7	4	–	8
Colorado	1	–	8	3	–	9
Oklahoma State	0	–	9	1	–	11
Championship: Texas Tech 34, BYU 7
^ – College Football Playoff participant; $ – Conference champion; y – Championship game participant; Rankings from AP Poll

The 2025 Iowa State Cyclones football team represented Iowa State University as a member of the Big 12 Conference during the 2025 NCAA Division I FBS football season. The team was led by tenth-year head coach Matt Campbell, and played home games at Jack Trice Stadium in Ames, Iowa.

On December 5, Campbell was announced as the new head coach at Penn State. Days later, having finished their season with a winning record, the team opted out of a bowl appearance following a vote by players, citing a lack of healthy players to practice or play. On December 8, Washington State head coach Jimmy Rogers was announced as the Cyclones' new head coach.

The Iowa State Cyclones drew an average home attendance of 60,862.

== Schedule ==
Date	Time	Opponent	Rank	Site	TV	Result	Attendance	Source
August 23	11:00 a.m.	vs. No. 17 Kansas State	No. 22	Aviva Stadium; Dublin, Ireland (Aer Lingus College Football Classic, Farmageddon)	ESPN	W 24–21	47,221	
August 30	2:30 p.m.	No. 4 (FCS) South Dakota*	No. 22	Jack Trice Stadium; Ames, IA	FOX	W 55–7	61,500	
September 6	11:00 a.m.	Iowa*	No. 16	Jack Trice Stadium; Ames, IA (Cy-Hawk Trophy, Big Noon Kickoff)	FOX	W 16–13	61,500	
September 13	3:00 p.m.	at Arkansas State*	No. 14	Centennial Bank Stadium; Jonesboro, AR	ESPN2	W 24–16	22,248	
September 27	6:00 p.m.	Arizona	No. 14	Jack Trice Stadium; Ames, IA	ESPN	W 39–14	61,500	
October 4	11:00 a.m.	at Cincinnati	No. 14	Nippert Stadium; Cincinnati, OH	ESPN2	L 30–38	38,007	
October 11	2:30 p.m.	at Colorado	No. 22	Folsom Field; Boulder, CO	ESPN	L 17–24	52,698	
October 25	2:30 p.m.	No. 11 BYU^{†}		Jack Trice Stadium; Ames, IA	FOX	L 27–41	61,500	
November 1	12:00 p.m.	Arizona State		Jack Trice Stadium; Ames, IA	TNT/TruTV	L 19–24	60,889	
November 8	2:30 p.m.	at TCU		Amon G. Carter Stadium; Fort Worth, TX	FOX	W 20–17	44,197	
November 22	11:00 a.m.	Kansas		Jack Trice Stadium; Ames, IA	FS1	W 38–14	58,275	
November 29	11:00 a.m.	at Oklahoma State		Boone Pickens Stadium; Stillwater, OK	ESPNU	W 20–13	35,127	
*Non-conference game; ^{†}Homecoming; Rankings from AP Poll (and CFP rankings, after November 5) - Released prior to game; All times are in Central time

== Rankings ==
Ranking movements Legend: ██ Increase in ranking ██ Decrease in ranking — = Not ranked RV = Received votes т = Tied with team above or below
	Week																
Poll	Pre	1	2	3	4	5	6	7	8	9	10	11	12	13	14	15	Final
AP	22	16	14	12	14	14	22	—	—	—	—	—	—	—	RV	RV	—
Coaches	21т	18	14	13	13	12	21	RV	RV	—	—	—	—	—	—	RV	—
CFP	Not released										—	—	—	—	—	—	Not released

== Game summaries ==
=== vs. No. 17 Kansas State (Farmageddon) ===
No. 22 Iowa State Cyclones (0–0) vs. No. 17 Kansas State Wildcats (0–0) – Game summary

Quarter	1	2	3	4	Total
No. 22 Cyclones	7	0	7	10	24
No. 17 Wildcats	0	7	0	14	21

at Aviva Stadium • Dublin, Ireland

- Date: August 23
- Game time: 11:00 a.m.
- Game weather: Rain, 67 °F (19 °C), S 3 MPH
- Game attendance: 47,221
- Referee: Tuta Salaam
- TV announcers (ESPN): Dave Pasch (play-by-play), Dusty Dvoracek (analyst), and Taylor McGregor (sideline)

Game information

First quarter

- (3:26) Iowa State – Rocco Becht 23-yard pass to Dominic Overby (Kyle Konrardy kick) (Drive: 4 plays, 49 yards, 1:44; Iowa State 7–0)

Second quarter

- (14:55) Kansas State – Avery Johnson 10-yard run (Luis Rodriguez kick) (Drive: 8 plays, 65 yards, 3:31; Tied 7–7)

Third quarter

- (1:07) Iowa State – Rocco Becht 24-yard pass to Brett Eskildsen (Kyle Konrardy kick) (Drive: 11 plays, 67 yards, 5:59; Iowa State 14–7)

Fourth quarter

- (14:09) Kansas State – Avery Johnson 37-yard pass to Jayce Brown (Luis Rodriguez kick) (Drive: 5 plays, 75 yards, 1:58; Tied 14–14)
- (10:04) Iowa State – Kyle Konrardy 34-yard field goal (Drive: 10 plays, 57 yards, 4:00; Iowa State 17–14)
- (6:38) Iowa State – Rocco Becht 7-yard run (Kyle Konrardy kick) (Drive: 4 plays, 30 yards, 1:41; Iowa State 24–14)
- (6:23) Kansas State – Avery Johnson 65-yard pass to Jerand Bradley (Luis Rodriquez kick) (Drive: 1 play, 65 yards, 0:09; Iowa State 24–21)

Statistics	ISU	KSU
First downs	19	13
Plays–yards	60–313	48–383
Rushes–yards	46–130	27–110
Passing yards	183	273
Passing: comp–att–int	14–28–0	21–30–0
Turnovers	2	2
Time of possession	33:52	26:08

Team	Category	Player	Statistics
Iowa State	Passing	Rocco Becht	14/28, 183 yards, 2 TD
Iowa State	Rushing	Carson Hansen	16 carries, 71 yards
Iowa State	Receiving	Brett Eskildsen	3 receptions, 46 yards, TD
Kansas State	Passing	Avery Johnson	21/30, 273 yards, 2 TD
Kansas State	Rushing	Joe Jackson	12 carries, 51 yards
Kansas State	Receiving	Jayce Brown	4 receptions, 78 yards, TD

=== vs No. 4 (FCS) South Dakota ===
No. 4 (FCS) South Dakota Coyotes (0–0) at No. 22 Iowa State Cyclones (1–0) – Game summary

Quarter	1	2	3	4	Total
No. 4 (FCS) Coyotes	7	0	0	0	7
No. 22 Cyclones	14	13	14	14	55

at Jack Trice Stadium • Ames, Iowa

- Date: August 30
- Game time: 2:30 p.m.
- Game weather: Sunny, 78 °F (26 °C), E 8 MPH
- Game attendance: 61,500
- Referee: Henry Johns
- TV announcers (FOX): Tim Brando (play-by-play), Devin Gardner (analyst), and Josh Sims (sideline)

Game information

First quarter

- ISU – Benjamin Brahmer 4-yard pass from Rocco Becht (Kyle Konrardy kick), 13:10. Cyclones 7–0. Drive: 4 plays, 75 yards, 1:50.
- SDAK – Larenzo Fenner 6-yard pass from Aidan Bouman (Will Leyland kick), 5:44. Tied 7–7. Drive: 12 plays, 75 yards, 7:26.
- ISU – Abu Sama III 15-yard run (Kyle Konrardy kick), 1:12. Cyclones 14–7. Drive: 9 plays, 75 yards, 4:32.

Second quarter

- ISU – Benjamin Brahmer 3-yard pass from Rocco Becht (Kyle Konrardy kick), 9:27. Cyclones 21–7. Drive: 7 plays, 76 yards, 3:55.
- ISU – Kyle Konrardy 28-yard field goal, 2:35. Cyclones 24–7. Drive: 11 plays, 52 yards, 5:16.
- ISU – Kyle Konrardy 63-yard field goal, 0:00. Cyclones 27–7. Drive: 4 plays, 24 yards, 0:27.

Third quarter

- ISU – Gabe Burkle 16-yard pass from Rocco Becht (Kyle Konrardy kick), 9:39. Cyclones 34–7. Drive: 4 plays, 33 yards, 2:00.
- ISU – Xavier Townsend 11-yard run (Chase Smith kick), 8:17. Cyclones 41–7. Drive: 2 plays, 24 yards, 0:47.

Fourth quarter

- ISU – Alex Manske 4-yard run (Chase Smith kick), 10:57. Cyclones 48–7. Drive: 15 plays, 64 yards, 8:45.
- ISU – Dylan Lee 8-yard run (Chase Smith kick), 4:22. Cyclones 55–7. Drive: 8 plays, 85 yards, 4:54.

Statistics	SDAK	ISU
First downs	11	28
Plays–yards	50–208	67–529
Rushes–yards	21–82	42–223
Passing yards	126	306
Passing: comp–att–int	15–29–2	23–25–0
Turnovers	2	0
Time of possession	24:42	35:18

Team	Category	Player	Statistics
South Dakota	Passing	Aidan Bouman	15/29, 126 yards, TD, 2 INT
South Dakota	Rushing	Charles Pierre Jr.	13 carries, 49 yards
South Dakota	Receiving	Charles Pierre Jr.	4 receptions, 37 yards
Iowa State	Passing	Rocco Becht	19/20, 278 yards, 3 TD
Iowa State	Rushing	Dylan Lee	13 carries, 81 yards, TD
Iowa State	Receiving	Gabe Burkle	4 receptions, 85 yards, TD

=== vs Iowa (Cy–Hawk Trophy) ===
Iowa Hawkeyes (1–0) at No. 16 Iowa State Cyclones (2–0) – Game summary

Quarter	1	2	3	4	Total
Hawkeyes	0	10	3	0	13
No. 16 Cyclones	6	7	0	3	16

at Jack Trice Stadium • Ames, Iowa

- Date: September 6
- Game time: 11:00 a.m.
- Game weather: Sunny • Temperature: 60 °F (16 °C) • Wind: NW at 8 miles per hour (13 km/h)
- Game attendance: 61,500
- Referee: Kole Knueppel
- TV announcers (FOX): Gus Johnson (play-by-play), Joel Klatt (analyst), and Jenny Taft (sideline)

Game information

First quarter

- ISU - Kyle Konrardy 44-yard field goal, 8:42. Cyclones 3–0. Drive: 8 plays, 29 yards, 3:59.
- ISU - Kyle Konrardy 27-yard field goal, 3:18. Cyclones 6–0. Drive: 10 plays, 67 yards, 3:51.

Second quarter

- IOWA - Drew Stevens 31-yard field goal, 12:53. Cyclones 6–3. Drive: 5 plays, 21 yards, 2:10.
- ISU - Benjamin Brahmer 2-yard pass from Rocco Becht (Kyle Konrardy kick), 4:50. Cyclones 13–3. Drive: 5 plays, 18 yards, 2:45.
- IOWA – Mark Gronowski 2-yard run (Drew Stevens kick), 0:27. Cyclones 13–10. Drive: 16 plays, 85 yards, 4:16.

Third quarter

- IOWA – Drew Stevens 36-yard field goal, 4:28. Tied 13–13. Drive: 16 plays, 77 yards, 9:28.

Fourth quarter

- ISU – Kyle Konrardy 54-yard field goal, 1:54. Cyclones 16–13. Drive: 13 plays, 55 yards, 6:29.

Statistics	IOWA	ISU
First downs	16	14
Plays–yards	63–214	57–238
Rushes–yards	39–131	30–104
Passing yards	83	134
Passing: comp–att–int	13–24–1	18–27–0
Turnovers	1	1
Time of possession	31:08	28:52

Team	Category	Player	Statistics
Iowa	Passing	Mark Gronowski	13/24, 83 yards, INT
Iowa	Rushing	Jaziun Patterson	11 carries, 60 yards
Iowa	Receiving	Jacob Gill	5 receptions, 52 yards
Iowa State	Passing	Rocco Becht	18/27, 134 yards, TD
Iowa State	Rushing	Abu Sama III	12 carries, 47 yards
Iowa State	Receiving	Brett Eskildsen	2 receptions, 39 yards

=== at Arkansas State ===
No. 14 Iowa State Cyclones (3–0) at Arkansas State Red Wolves (1–1) – Game summary

Quarter	1	2	3	4	Total
No. 14 Cyclones	9	8	0	7	24
Red Wolves	0	10	3	3	16

at Centennial Bank Stadium • Jonesboro, Arkansas

- Date: September 13
- Game time: 3:00 p.m.
- Game weather: Sunny • Temperature: 92 °F (33 °C) • Wind: SW at 7 mph (11 km/h)
- Game attendance: 22,348
- Referee: Cravonne Barrett
- TV announcers (ESPN2): Mike Monaco (play-by-play), Kirk Morrison (analyst), and Dawn Davenport (sideline)

Game information

First quarter

- (9:07) ISU – Kyle Konrardy 41-yard field goal (Drive: 10 plays, 52 yards, 4:10; Iowa State 3–0)
- (2:42) ISU – Rocco Becht 10-yard run, Kyle Konrardy PAT failed (Drive: 7 play, 91 yards, 3:58; Iowa State 9–0)

Second quarter

- (13:11) ARST – Clune Van Andel 45-yard field goal (Drive: 8 plays, 55 yards, 4:18; Iowa State 9–3)
- (0:39) ARST – Jaylen Raynor 3-yard rush, Clune Van Andel kick (Drive: 17 plays, 70 yards, 8:13; Arkansas State 10–9)
- (0:11) ISU – Dominic Overby 27-yard pass from Rocco Becht, Carson Hansen two-point conversion pass from Rocco Becht (Drive: 5 plays, 75 yards, 0:28; Iowa State 17–10)

Third quarter

- (9:08) ARST – Clune Van Andel 36-yard field goal (Drive: 14 plays, 50 yards, 5:48; Iowa State 17–13)

Fourth quarter

- (11:53) ARST – Clune Van Andel 40-yard field goal (Drive: 18 plays, 85 yards, 6:27; Iowa State 17–16)
- (8:34) ISU – Abu Sama III 4-yard run, Chase Smith kick (Drive: 9 plays, 75 yards, 3:19; Iowa State 24–16)

Statistics	ISU	ARST
First downs	20	20
Plays–yards	59–452	73–382
Rushes–yards	34–187	40–160
Passing yards	265	222
Passing: comp–att–int	14–25–1	19–33–1
Turnovers	1	1
Time of possession	25:19	34:41

Team	Category	Player	Statistics
Iowa State	Passing	Rocco Becht	14/25, 265 yards, TD, INT
Iowa State	Rushing	Carson Hansen	18 carries, 116 yards
Iowa State	Receiving	Xavier Townsend	3 receptions, 92 yards
Arkansas State	Passing	Jaylen Raynor	19/33, 222 yards, INT
Arkansas State	Rushing	Jaylen Raynor	16 carries, 83 yards, TD
Arkansas State	Receiving	Chauncey Cobb	7 receptions, 81 yards

=== vs Arizona ===
Arizona Wildcats (3–0) at No. 14 Iowa State Cyclones (4–0) – Game summary

Quarter	1	2	3	4	Total
Wildcats	0	7	7	0	14
No. 14 Cyclones	8	14	14	3	39

at Jack Trice Stadium • Ames, Iowa

- Date: September 27
- Game time: 6:00 p.m.
- Game weather: Clear, 80 °F (27 °C)
- Game attendance: 61,500
- Referee: David Alvarez
- TV announcers (ESPN): Dave Flemming (play-by-play), Brock Osweiler (analyst), and Stormy Buonantony (sideline)

Game information

First quarter

- (5:56) ISU – Rocco Becht 1-yard run, Gabe Burkle run for two-point conversion (Drive: 9 plays, 72 yards, 4:21; Iowa State 8–0)

Second quarter

- (12:41) ISU – Carson Hansen 1-yard run, Chase Smith kick (Drive: 6 plays, 38 yards, 2:31; Iowa State 15–0)
- (2:52) ISU – Carson Hansen 3-yard run, Chase Smith kick (Drive: 4 plays, 30 yards, 1:59; Iowa State 22–0)
- (0:22) ARIZ – Kris Hutson 9-yard pass from Noah Fifita, Michael Salgado-Medina kick (Drive: 12 plays, 69 yards, 2:24; Iowa State 22–7)

Third quarter

- (11:30) ISU – Rocco Becht 1-yard run, Chase Smith kick (Drive: 7 plays, 75 yards, 3:30; Iowa State 29–7)
- (8:08) ISU – Rocco Becht 1-yard run, Chase Smith kick (Drive: 3 plays, 44 yards, 0:48; Iowa State 36–7)
- (2:46) ARIZ – Tre Spivey 1-yard pass from Noah Fifita, Michael Salgado-Medina kick (Drive: 12 plays, 74 yards, 5:18; Iowa State 36–14)

Fourth quarter

- (0:43) ISU – Chase Smith 34-yard field goal (Drive: 7 plays, 34 yards, 1:32; Iowa State 39–14)

Statistics	ARIZ	ISU
First downs	20	19
Plays–yards	72–360	69–399
Rushes–yards	24–107	47–111
Passing yards	253	288
Passing: Comp–Att–Int	32–48–2	15–22–1
Turnovers	2	1
Time of possession	28:55	31:05

Team	Category	Player	Statistics
Arizona	Passing	Noah Fifita	32/48, 253 yards, 2 TD, 2 INT
Arizona	Rushing	Ismail Mahdi	13 carries, 85 yards
Arizona	Receiving	Kris Hutson	6 receptions, 67 yards, TD
Iowa State	Passing	Rocco Becht	14/20, 243 yards, INT
Iowa State	Rushing	Carson Hansen	19 carries, 63 yards, 2 TD
Iowa State	Receiving	Chase Sowell	4 receptions, 146 yards

=== at Cincinnati ===
No. 14 Iowa State Cyclones (5–0) at Cincinnati Bearcats (3–1) – Game summary

Quarter	1	2	3	4	Total
No. 14 Cyclones	0	15	7	8	30
Bearcats	17	14	0	7	38

at Nippert Stadium • Cincinnati, Ohio

- Date: October 4
- Game time: 11:00 a.m.
- Game weather: Sunny, 78 °F (26 °C)
- Game attendance: 38,007
- Referee: Kevin Boitmann
- TV announcers (ESPN2): Roy Philpott (play-by-play), Sam Acho (analyst) and Taylor Davis (sideline)

Game information

First quarter

- CIN – Evan Pryor 30-yard run (Stephen Rusnak kick), 12:25. Bearcats 7–0. Drive: 6 plays, 80 yards, 2:28.
- CIN – Stephen Rusnak 38-yard field goal, 7:54. Bearcats 10–0. Drive: 8 plays, 62 yards, 2:05.
- CIN – Joe Royer 12-yard pass from Brendan Sorsby (Stephen Rusnak kick), 0:23. Bearcats 17–0. Drive: 9 plays, 70 yards, 3:38.

Second quarter

- ISU – Rocco Becht 14-yard run (Chase Smith kick), 14:55. Bearcats 17–7. Drive: 3 plays, 75 yards, 0:28.
- CIN – Evan Pryor 18-yard run (Stephen Rusnak kick), 13:40. Bearcats 24–7. Drive: 4 plays, 55 yards, 1:06.
- CIN – Brendan Sorsby 20-yard run (Stephen Rusnak kick), 1:08. Bearcats 31–7. Drive: 13 plays, 80 yards, 5:20.
- ISU – Rocco Becht 4-yard run (Major Cantrell pass to Benjamin Brahmer), 0:00. Bearcats 31–15. Drive: 6 plays, 75 yards, 1:08.

Third quarter

- ISU – Brett Eskildsen 11-yard pass from Rocco Becht (Chase Smith kick), 8:06. Bearcats 31–22. Drive: 14 plays, 75 yards, 6:54.

Fourth quarter

- CIN – Caleb Goodie 82-yard pass from Brendan Sorsby (Stephen Rusnak kick), 5:57. Bearcats 38–22. Drive: 3 plays, 84 yards, 1:43.
- ISU – Chase Sowell 3-yard pass from Rocco Becht (Rocco Becht pass to Benjamin Brahmer), 1:56. Bearcats 38–30. Drive: 13 plays, 75 yards, 4:01.

Statistics	ISU	CIN
First downs	29	20
Plays–yards	85–470	59–474
Rushes–yards	37–156	34–260
Passing yards	314	214
Passing: comp–att–int	30–48–0	13–25–0
Turnovers	0	1
Time of possession	34:56	25:04

Team	Category	Player	Statistics
Iowa State	Passing	Rocco Becht	30/48, 314 yards, 2 TD
Iowa State	Rushing	Abu Sama	18 carries, 96 yards
Iowa State	Receiving	Brett Eskildsen	8 receptions, 105 yards, TD
Cincinnati	Passing	Brendan Sorsby	13/25, 214 yards, 2 TD
Cincinnati	Rushing	Evan Pryor	10 carries, 111 yards, 2 TD
Cincinnati	Receiving	Caleb Goodie	2 receptions, 83 yards, TD

=== at Colorado ===
No. 22 Iowa State Cyclones (5–1) at Colorado Buffaloes (2–4) – Game summary

Quarter	1	2	3	4	Total
No. 22 Cyclones	0	10	7	0	17
Buffaloes	7	0	14	3	24

at Folsom Field • Boulder, Colorado

- Date: October 11
- Game time: 2:30 p.m.
- Game weather: Cloudy; 64 °F (18 °C)
- Game attendance: 52,698
- Referee: Stephen Baron
- TV announcers (ESPN): Mike Monaco (play-by-play), Louis Riddick (analyst), and Kris Budden (sideline)

Game information

First quarter

- (0:00) COL – Micah Welch 8-yard run, Alejandro Mata kick (Drive: 12 plays, 90 yards, 5:04; Colorado 7–0)

Second quarter

- (6:40) ISU – Chase Smith 38-yard field goal (Drive: 8 plays, 50 yards, 4:08; Colorado 7–3)
- (6:40) ISU – Abu Sama III 1-yard run, Chase Smith kick (Drive: 10 plays, 96 yards, 1:45; Iowa State 10–7)

Third quarter

- (14:13) COL – Omarion Miller 70-yard pass from Kaidon Salter, Alejandro Mata kick (Drive: 2 plays, 73 yards, 0:42; Colorado 14–10)
- (9:26) ISU – Abu Sama III 1-yard run, Chase Smith kick (Drive: 9 plays, 75 yards, 4:47; Iowa State 17–14)
- (4:26) COL – Joseph Williams 3-yard pass from Kaidon Salter, Alejandro Mata kick (Drive: 10 plays, 52 yards, 4:51; Colorado 21–17)

Fourth quarter

- (5:13) COL – Alejandro Mata 29-yard field goal (Drive: 4 plays, 7 yards, 1:54; Colorado 24–17)

Statistics	ISU	COLO
First downs	22	16
Plays–yards	70–441	64–395
Rushes–yards	37–236	39–140
Passing yards	205	255
Passing: comp–att–int	18–33–1	16–25–0
Turnovers	1	0
Time of possession	29:57	30:03

Team	Category	Player	Statistics
Iowa State	Passing	Rocco Becht	18/33, 205 yards, INT
Iowa State	Rushing	Abu Sama III	24 carries, 177 yards, 2 TD
Iowa State	Receiving	Benjamin Brahmer	5 receptions, 56 yards
Colorado	Passing	Kaidon Salter	16/25, 255 yards, 2 TD
Colorado	Rushing	Dallan Hayden	12 carries, 58 yards
Colorado	Receiving	Joseph Williams	8 receptions, 128 yards, TD

=== vs No. 11 BYU ===
No. 11 BYU Cougars (7–0) at Iowa State Cyclones (5–2) – Game summary

Quarter	1	2	3	4	Total
No. 11 Cougars	7	10	10	14	41
Cyclones	17	7	3	0	27

at Jack Trice Stadium • Ames, Iowa

- Date: October 25
- Game time: 2:30 p.m.
- Game weather: Cloudy, 55 °F (13 °C), Winds 12mph SE
- Game attendance: 61,500
- Referee: Mike McCabe
- TV announcers (FOX): Jason Benetti (play-by-play), Robert Griffin III (analyst), and Alexa Landestoy (sideline)

Game information

First quarter

- ISU – 14:51 Brett Eskildsen 75-yard pass from Rocco Becht (Kyle Konrardy kick). ISU 7–0. Drive: 1 play, 75 yards, 0:09.
- BYU – 12:13 LJ Martin 4-yard run (Will Ferrin kick). TIED 7–7. Drive: 5 plays, 68 yards, 2:32.
- ISU – 8:05 Kyle Konrardy 36-yard Field Goal. ISU 10–7. Drive: 11 plays, 57 yards, 4:08.
- ISU – 1:00 Carson Hansen 2-yard run (Kyle Konrardy kick). ISU 17–7. Drive: 9 plays, 60 yards, 4:24.

Second quarter

- BYU – 8:59 Will Ferrin 50-yard Field Goal. ISU 17-10. Drive: 7 plays, 42 yards, 2:11.
- ISU – 1:52 Carson Hansen 3-yard run (Kyle Konrardy kick). ISU 24–10. Drive: 12 plays, 80 yards, 7:02.
- BYU – 0:25 Parker Kingston 12-yard pass from Bear Bachmeier (Will Ferrin kick). ISU 24–17. Drive: 10 plays, 60 yards, 1:20.

Third quarter

- BYU – 10:52 Will Ferrin 27-yard Field Goal. ISU 24-20. Drive: 11 plays, 57 yards, 4:08.
- BYU – 4:33 Bear Bachmeier 9-yard run (Will Ferrin kick). BYU 27–24. Drive: 11 plays, 79 yards, 4:28.
- ISU – 1:43 Kyle Konrardy 43-yard Field Goal. TIED 27–27. Drive: 5 plays, 50 yards, 2:46.

Fourth quarter

- BYU – 14:21 Parker Kingston 27-yard pass from Bear Bachmeier (Will Ferrin kick). BYU 34–27. Drive: 3 plays, 33 yards, 0:44.
- BYU – 13:40 Faletau Satuala 40-yard interception return (Will Ferrin kick). BYU 41–27.

Statistics	BYU	ISU
First downs	17	24
Plays–yards	64–410	70–495
Rushes–yards	28–103	34–184
Passing yards	307	311
Passing: comp–att–int	22–35–0	24–36–3
Turnovers	0	4
Time of possession	27:50	32:10

Team	Category	Player	Statistics
BYU	Passing	Bear Bachmeier	22/35, 307 yards, 2 TD
BYU	Rushing	Bear Bachmeier	12 carries, 49 yards, TD
BYU	Receiving	Parker Kingston	7 receptions, 133 yards, 2 TD
Iowa State	Passing	Rocco Becht	24/36, 311 yards, TD, 3 INT
Iowa State	Rushing	Carson Hansen	16 carries, 152 yards, 2 TD
Iowa State	Receiving	Benjamin Brahmer	5 receptions, 75 yards

=== vs Arizona State ===
Arizona State Sun Devils (5–3) at Iowa State Cyclones (5–3) – Game summary

Quarter	1	2	3	4	Total
Sun Devils	3	14	7	0	24
Cyclones	3	13	3	0	19

at Jack Trice Stadium • Ames, Iowa

- Date: November 1
- Game time: 12:00 p.m.
- Game weather:
- Game attendance: 60,899
- Referee:
- TV announcers (TNT/TruTV): J.B. Long (play-by-play), Mike Golic Jr. (analyst) and Bridget Howard (sideline)

Game information

First quarter

- ISU – Kyle Konrardy 30-yard field goal, 5:45. Cyclones 3–0. Drive: 6 plays, 32 yards, 3:17.
- ASU – Jesus Gomez 35-yard field goal, 0:54. Tied 3–3. Drive: 11 plays, 55 yards, 4:45.

Second quarter

- ISU – Rocco Becht 7-yard run (Kyle Konrardy kick), 12:45. Cyclones 10–3. Drive: 8 plays, 71 yards, 3:06.
- ASU – Jeff Sims 8-yard run (Jesus Gomez kick), 10:43. Tied 10–10. Drive: 4 plays, 88 yards, 1:56.
- ASU – Chamon Metayer 18-yard pass from Jeff Sims (Jesus Gomez kick), 4:55. Sun Devils 17–10. Drive: 8 plays, 56 yards, 3:36.
- ISU – Benjamin Brahmer 17-yard pass from Rocco Becht (Kyle Konrardy kick failed), 1:01. Sun Devils 17–16. Drive: 2 plays, 24 yards, 0:30.

Third quarter

- ASU – Jeff Sims 88-yard run (Jesus Gomez kick), 7:47. Sun Devils 24–16. Drive: 3 plays, 94 yards, 1:24.
- ISU – Kyle Konrardy 35-yard field goal, 0:01. Sun Devils 24–19. Drive: 9 plays, 76 yards, 4:34.

Fourth quarter

- No scoring plays.

Statistics	ASU	ISU
First downs	20	21
Plays–yards	70–467	69–336
Rushes–yards	46–290	32–150
Passing yards	177	186
Passing: comp–att–int	13–24–1	18–37–1
Turnovers	3	1
Time of possession	32:04	27:56

Team	Category	Player	Statistics
Arizona State	Passing	Jeff Sims	13/24, 177 yards, TD, INT
Arizona State	Rushing	Jeff Sims	29 carries, 228 yards, 2 TD
Arizona State	Receiving	Chamon Metayer	6 receptions, 68 yards, TD
Iowa State	Passing	Rocco Becht	18/36, 186 yards, TD, INT
Iowa State	Rushing	Carson Hansen	18 carries, 113 yards
Iowa State	Receiving	Chase Sowell	6 receptions, 85 yards

=== at TCU ===
Iowa State Cyclones (5–4) at TCU Horned Frogs (6–2) – Game summary

Quarter	1	2	3	4	Total
Cyclones	6	0	0	14	20
Horned Frogs	0	3	7	7	17

at Amon G. Carter Stadium • Fort Worth, Texas

- Date: November 8
- Game time: 2:30 p.m.
- Game weather:
- Game attendance: 44,197
- Referee: Stephen Baron
- TV announcers (FOX): Connor Onion (play-by-play) and Mark Helfrich (analyst)

Game information

First quarter

- ISU – Benjamin Brahmer 23-yard pass from Rocco Becht (run failed), 9:18. Cyclones 6–0. Drive: 8 plays, 65 yards, 3:29.

Second quarter

- TCU – Nate McCashland 35-yard field goal, 3:54. Cyclones 6–3. Drive: 13 plays, 73 yards, 5:15.

Third quarter

- TCU – Jordan Dwyer 14-yard pass from Josh Hoover (Nate McCashland kick), 9:07. Horned Frogs 10–6. Drive: 14 plays, 78 yards, 5:52.

Fourth quarter

- TCU – Trent Battle 2-yard run (Nate McCashland kick), 13:30. Horned Frogs 17–6. Drive: 11 plays, 92 yards, 4:29.
- ISU – Carson Hansen 1-yard run (run failed), 8:12. Horned Frogs 17–12. Drive: 11 plays, 75 yards, 5:18.
- ISU – Aiden Flora 79-yard punt return (Carson Hansen run), 6:32. Cyclones 20–17.

Statistics	ISU	TCU
First downs	15	30
Plays–yards	65–272	80–432
Rushes–yards	41–161	30–113
Passing yards	111	319
Passing: comp–att–int	9–24–2	34–50–2
Turnovers	2	3
Time of possession	27:24	32:36

Team	Category	Player	Statistics
Iowa State	Passing	Rocco Becht	9/24, 111 yards, TD, 2 INT
Iowa State	Rushing	Carson Hansen	28 carries, 108 yards, TD
Iowa State	Receiving	Chase Sowell	4 receptions, 31 yards
TCU	Passing	Josh Hoover	34/50, 319 yards, TD, 2 INT
TCU	Rushing	Jeremy Payne	8 carries, 71 yards
TCU	Receiving	Jordan Dwyer	11 receptions, 108 yards, TD

=== vs Kansas ===
Kansas Jayhawks (5–5) at Iowa State Cyclones (6–4) – Game summary

Quarter	1	2	3	4	Total
Jayhawks	0	0	14	0	14
Cyclones	7	10	14	7	38

at Jack Trice Stadium • Ames, Iowa

- Date: November 22
- Game time: 11:00 a.m.
- Game weather:
- Game attendance: 58,275
- Referee: Kevin Boitmann
- TV announcers (FS1): Noah Reed (play-by-play) and Robert Smith (analyst)

Game information

First quarter

- ISU – Brett Eskildsen 9-yard pass from Rocco Becht (Kyle Konrardy kick), 8:23. Cyclones 7–0. Drive: 12 plays, 75 yards, 6:37.

Second quarter

- ISU – Carson Hansen 4-yard run (Kyle Konrardy kick), 14:56. Cyclones 14–0. Drive: 10 plays, 72 yards, 5:24.
- ISU – Kyle Konrardy 55-yard field goal, 6:43. Cyclones 17–0. Drive: 7 plays, 40 yards, 3:49.

Third quarter

- KU – Leshon Williams 4-yard run (Laith Marjan kick), 13:06. Cyclones 17–7. Drive: 4 plays, 65 yards, 1:54.
- ISU – Brett Eskilden 20-yard pass from Rocco Becht (Kyle Konrardy kick), 8:52. Cyclones 24–7. Drive: 8 plays, 75 yards, 4:14.
- KU – Boden Groen 21-yard pass from Cole Ballard (Laith Marjan kick), 7:35. Cyclones 24–14. Drive: 4 plays, 62 yards, 1:08.
- ISU – Benjamin Brahmer 12-yard pass from Rocco Becht (Kyle Konrardy kick), 2:18. Cyclones 31–14. Drive: 10 plays, 59 yards, 5:08.

Fourth quarter

- ISU – Aiden Flora 38-yard run (Kyle Konrardy kick), 1:07. Cyclones 38–14. Drive: 9 plays, 84 yards, 5:54.

Statistics	KU	ISU
First downs	17	25
Plays–yards	50–323	73–462
Rushes–yards	21–132	50–221
Passing yards	191	241
Passing: comp–att–int	16–29–1	18–23–0
Turnovers	1	0
Time of possession	20:52	39:08

Team	Category	Player	Statistics
Kansas	Passing	Jalon Daniels	13/23, 154 yards, INT
Kansas	Rushing	Daniel Hishaw Jr.	8 carries, 50 yards
Kansas	Receiving	Boden Groen	5 receptions, 76 yards, TD
Iowa State	Passing	Rocco Becht	18/23, 241 yards, 3 TD
Iowa State	Rushing	Carson Hansen	22 carries, 120 yards, TD
Iowa State	Receiving	Brett Eskildsen	6 receptions, 73 yards, 2 TD

=== at Oklahoma State ===
Iowa State Cyclones (7-4) at Oklahoma State Cowboys (1-10) – Game summary

Quarter	1	2	3	4	Total
Cyclones	3	7	7	3	20
Cowboys	0	7	3	3	13

at Boone Pickens Stadium • Stillwater, Oklahoma

- Date: November 29
- Game time: 11:00 a.m.
- Game weather: Cloudy • Temperature: 51 °F (11 °C) • Wind: NW at 25 mph (40 km/h)
- Game attendance: 35,127
- Referee: Henry Johns
- TV announcers (ESPNU): Richard Cross (play-by-play) and Craig Haubert (analyst)

Game information

First quarter

- (1:35) ISU – Kyle Konrardy 45-yard field goal (Drive: 12 plays, 38 yards, 6:18; ISU 3–0)

Second quarter

- (8:11) ISU – Chase Sowell 16-yard pass from Rocco Becht, Kyle Konrardy kick (Drive: 4 plays, 46 yards, 2:08; ISU 10–0)
- (1:21) OKST – Trent Howland 8-yard run, Logan Ward kick (Drive: 14 plays, 80 yards, 6:46; ISU 10–7)

Third quarter

- (10:39) ISU – Abu Sama III 40-yard run, Kyle Konrardy kick (Drive: 4 plays, 79 yards, 1:27; ISU 17–7)
- (5:31) OKST – Logan Ward 28-yard field goal (Drive: 4 plays, 3 yards, 2:05; ISU 17–10)

Fourth quarter

- (11:31) OKST – Kyle Konrardy 34-yard field goal (Drive: 7 plays, 34 yards, 0:17; ISU 20–10)
- (3:50) OKST – Logan Ward 41-yard field goal (Drive: 9 plays, 33 yards, 4:04; ISU 20–13)

Statistics	ISU	OKST
First downs	17	12
Plays–yards	66–344	57–229
Rushes–yards	47–231	23–27
Passing yards	113	202
Passing: comp–att–int	9–19–0	23–34–1
Turnovers	1	2
Time of possession	32:59	27:01

Team	Category	Player	Statistics
Iowa State	Passing	Rocco Becht	8/17, 94 yards, TD
Iowa State	Rushing	Carson Hansen	24 carries, 109 yards
Iowa State	Receiving	Chase Sowell	4 receptions, 54 yards, TD
Oklahoma State	Passing	Zane Flores	19/30, 166 yards, INT
Oklahoma State	Rushing	Trent Howland	14 carries, 37 yards, TD
Oklahoma State	Receiving	Terrill Davis	5 receptions, 57 yards

== Roster ==
2025 roster
Quarterbacks: 3 Rocco Becht – (redshirt) Jr.; 5 Connor Moberly – (redshirt) Fr.; 7 Alex Manske – Fr.; 14 Major Cantrell – (redshirt) Fr.; 16 Wyatt Bohm – (redshirt) So.; Running backs: 2 Dylan Lee – (redshirt) Fr.; 21 Aiden Flora – (redshirt) Fr.; 24 Abu Sama – Jr.; 25 Easton Miller - (redshirt) So.; 26 Carson Hansen - Jr.; 27 Jayden Jackson - Fr.; 39 AJ Peterson - (redshirt) So.; Wide receivers: 0 Chase Sowell – (redshirt) Jr.; 4 Xavier Townsend – (redshirt) Jr.; 6 Eli Green – (redshirt) Sr.; 9 Brett Eskildsen – So.; 10 Carson Brown – (redshirt) Jr.; 11 Dominic Overby – (redshirt) Fr.; 13 Zay Robinson – Fr.; 16 Daniel Jackson – (redshirt) Sr.; 19 Michael Parkes – (redshirt) So.; 23 Carson Robbins – (redshirt) Fr.; 80 Jonathan Vande Walle – (redshirt) So.; 81 Karon Brookins – Fr.; 83 Sam Zelenovich – Fr.; 88 Dyllan Malone – Fr.; 89 Ty Claiborne – (redshirt) Jr.; Tight ends: 17 Kai Black – (redshirt) So.; 18 Benjamin Brahmer – Jr.; 37 Vince Benetti – (redshirt) So.; 47 Cash Hayden – (redshirt) Fr.; 48 Jack Bjorn – (redshirt) Jr.; 82 Tyler Moore – (redshirt) Sr.; 84 Gabe Burkle – (redshirt) Jr.; 85 Keaton Roskop – (redshirt) Fr.; 86 Tripp Walsh – (redshirt) So.; 87 Cooper Alexander – (redshirt) Fr.	Offensive line: 50 Tyler Maro – (redshirt) Sr.; 51 Brendan Black – Jr.; 54 Vaea Ikakoula – Fr.; 60 Kuol Kuol II – Fr.; 61 Dylan Barrett – (redshirt) Sr.; 62 Braden Simonsen – (redshirt) Jr.; 63 Jim Bonifas – (redshirt) Sr.; 64 Sione Perkins – Fr.; 65 Garret Rutledge – (redshirt) Fr.; 66 Tyler Miller – (redshirt) Sr.; 67 Carson Rhodes – (redshirt) Fr.; 68 Makai Sat – Jr.; 69 Dontrell Holt – (redshirt) Fr.; 70 Trevor Buhr – (redshirt) So.; 71 Gabriel Greenlee – (redshirt) Jr.; 72 Austin Barrett – (redshirt) So.; 73 Deylin Hasert – (redshirt) Jr.; 74 Derek Jensen – (redshirt) Fr.; 75 James Neal III – (redshirt) Sr.; 77 Easton Eledge – (redshirt) Jr.; 78 Will Tompkins – Fr.; Long snappers: 56 Drew Clausen – (redshirt) Sr.; 57 Gavin Schieler – Fr.; 60 Jacob Lyftogt – (redshirt) So.; Defensive line: 6 Myles Mendeszoon – (redshirt) Sr.; 8 Vontroy Malone – (redshirt) Jr.; 44 Trey Verdon – Fr.; 49 Charlie Woleben – Fr.; 50 Jack Limbaugh – Fr.; 52 Ka'Mori Moore – Fr.; 53 Zaimir Hawk – (redshirt) So.; 55 Jace Gilbert – (redshirt) Fr.; 56 Aliijah Carnell – (redshirt) Fr.; 58 Tamatoa McDonough – (redshirt) Sr.; 88 Ikenna Ezeogu – (redshirt) Jr.; 91 Markell Chapman – (redshirt) So.; 95 Domonique Orange – Sr.; 96 Chet Andrews – (redshirt) Jr.; 98 BJ Carter – Fr.; 99 Cannon Butler – (redshirt) Sr.	Linebackers: 0 Zachary Lovett – (redshirt) Sr.; 9 Cael Brezina – So.; 14 Carson Willich – (redshirt) Jr.; 22 John Klosterman – (redshirt) Jr.; 23 Will McLaughlin – (redshirt) Jr.; 26 Caleb Bacon – (redshirt) Sr.; 34 Beau Goodwin – So.; 40 Mason Miller – (redshirt) Fr.; 41 Rylan Barnes – (redshirt) So.; 42 Will Hawthorne – Fr.; 45 Samuel Same – (redshirt) So.; 46 Danny Inglis – (redshirt) Fr.; 47 Kooper Ebel – Jr.; 51 Nick Reinicke – (redshirt) So.; Cornerbacks: 2 Jamison Patton – So.; 3 Jontez Williams – (redshirt) Jr.; 4 Jeremiah Cooper – Sr.; 5 Beni Ngoyi – (redshirt) So.; 7 Tre Bell – Jr.; 12 Ethan Stecker – Fr.; 13 Cam Smith – Jr.; 17 Connor Welsch – (redshirt) Fr.; 18 David Coffey – (redshirt) Fr.; 19 Ta'Shawn James – (redshirt) So.; 20 Khijohnn Cummings-Coleman – (redshirt) Fr.; 24 Quentin Taylor Jr. – (redshirt) Fr.; 25 Josh Patterson – Fr.; 27 LaMarcus Hicks II – Fr.; 29 Drew Surges – (redshirt) So.; 31 Marcus Neal Jr. – So.; 32 Angelo Jackson – (redshirt) Fr.; 33 Mason Ellens – Fr.; 35 Caden Kock – (redshirt) Jr.; 36 Carson Van Dinter – (redshirt) Fr.; 38 Eddie Lemos – (redshirt) Jr.; 43 Caden Matson – (redshirt) Jr.; 44 Wyatt Archer – (redshirt) So.; 48 Hunter Sowell – Fr.; Punters/Kickers: 20 Jace Gilbert – (redshirt) Jr.; 80 Tyler Perkins – Sr.; 93 Jonah DuPont – So.; 94 Chase Smith – Fr.; 97 Kyle Konrardy – (redshirt) So.
