= 2026 Iowa State Cyclones football team =

American college football season

2026 Iowa State Cyclones football
- Conference: Big 12 Conference
- Record: 5–6 (3–5 Big 12)
- Head coach: Jimmy Rogers (1st season)
- Offensive coordinator: Tyler Roehl (1st season)
- Offensive scheme: Pro-style
- Defensive coordinator: Jesse Bobbit (1st season)
- Base defense: 4–3
- Home stadium: Jack Trice Stadium

2026 Big 12 Conference football standings
| | Conf. | | | Overall |
| Team | W | | L | W | | L |
|---|---|---|---|---|---|---|
| No. 2 Utah | 7 | – | 0 | 10 | – | 0 |
| No. 12 Texas Tech | 6 | – | 1 | 9 | – | 1 |
| No. 10 BYU | 5 | – | 2 | 8 | – | 2 |
| No. 19 Arizona | 4 | – | 3 | 7 | – | 3 |
| No. 20 Houston | 4 | – | 3 | 7 | – | 3 |
| Oklahoma State | 4 | – | 3 | 6 | – | 4 |
| Arizona State | 4 | – | 3 | 6 | – | 4 |
| Baylor | 4 | – | 3 | 6 | – | 4 |
| UCF | 4 | – | 4 | 6 | – | 5 |
| TCU | 3 | – | 4 | 5 | – | 5 |
| Iowa State | 3 | – | 5 | 5 | – | 6 |
| Cincinnati | 2 | – | 5 | 5 | – | 5 |
| West Virginia | 2 | – | 5 | 5 | – | 5 |
| Colorado | 2 | – | 5 | 4 | – | 6 |
| Kansas | 2 | – | 5 | 4 | – | 6 |
| Kansas State | 1 | – | 6 | 4 | – | 6 |
Championship: December 4, 2026
^ – College Football Playoff participant; $ – Conference champion; y – Championship game participant; As of November 21, 2026; Rankings from CFP rankings

The 2026 Iowa State Cyclones football team is representing Iowa State University as they are a member of the Big 12 Conference during the 2026 NCAA Division I FBS football season. They are led by Jimmy Rogers in his first year as their head coach. The Cyclones play their home games at Jack Trice Stadium located in Ames, Iowa.

== Schedule ==
| Date | Time | Opponent | Site | TV | Result | Attendance |
|---|---|---|---|---|---|---|
| September 5 | 12:00 p.m. | Southeast Missouri State* | Jack Trice Stadium; Ames, IA | ESPN+ | W 38–10 | 51,802 |
| September 12 | 6:30 p.m. | at No. 21 Iowa* | Kinnick Stadium; Iowa City, IA (Cy-Hawk Trophy) | NBC | L 13–16 | 69,250 |
| September 19 | 11:00 a.m. | Bowling Green* | Jack Trice Stadium; Ames, IA | ESPNU | W 55–7 | 50,395 |
| September 26 | 2:30 p.m. | No. 15 Utah | Jack Trice Stadium; Ames, IA | FOX | L 17–31 | 52,150 |
| October 3 | 11:00 a.m. | West Virginia^{†} | Jack Trice Stadium; Ames, IA | TNT/TruTV | W 45–42 | 52,724 |
| October 9 | 9:15 p.m. | at No. 8 BYU | LaVell Edwards Stadium; Provo, UT | ESPN | L 10–24 | 64,632 |
| October 24 | 6:30 p.m. | at No. 25 Arizona | Casino Del Sol Stadium; Tucson, AZ | ESPN2 | L 3–39 | 45,477 |
| October 31 | 6:00 p.m. | No. 24 Oklahoma State | Jack Trice Stadium; Ames, IA | FOX | W 51–49 | 50,295 |
| November 7 | 11:00 a.m. | at Baylor | McLane Stadium; Waco, TX | FS1 | L 31–42 | 39,229 |
| November 14 | 11:00 a.m. | Cincinnati | Jack Trice Stadium; Ames, IA | TNT/TruTV | W 41–13 | 50,162 |
| November 20 | 5:00 p.m. | at UCF | Acrisure Bounce House; Orlando, FL | FS1 | L 17–48 | 34,043 |
| November 28 | 1:00 p.m. | Kansas State | Jack Trice Stadium; Ames, IA (Farmageddon) | ESPN+ | | |
*Non-conference game; ^{†}Homecoming; Rankings from AP Poll (and CFP Rankings, after November 3) – Released prior to game; All times are in Central time

== Game summaries ==
=== vs. Southeast Missouri State (FCS) ===
Southeast Missouri State Redhawks (FCS) (1–0) at Iowa State Cyclones (0–0) – Game summary

| Quarter | 1 | 2 | 3 | 4 | Total |
|---|---|---|---|---|---|
| Redhawks (FCS) | 0 | 7 | 0 | 3 | 10 |
| Cyclones | 14 | 14 | 3 | 7 | 38 |

at Jack Trice Stadium • Ames, Iowa

- Date: September 5
- Game time: 1:00 p.m. CDT
- Game weather: Cloudy • Temperature: 81 °F (27 °C) • Wind: NE at 7 miles per hour (11 km/h)
- Game attendance: 51,802
- Referee: Stephen Baron
- TV announcers (ESPN+): Shawn Kenney and Todd Doxzon

Game information

First quarter

- ISU – Jaylen Raynor with a 7-yard run (Kyle Konrardy kick), 10:08. Cyclones 7–0. Drive: 4 plays, 56 yards, 1:35.
- ISU – Vince Benetti 24-yard pass from Jaylen Raynor (Kyle Konrardy kick), 2:27. Cyclones 14–0. Drive: 2 plays, 24 yards, 0:46.

Second quarter

- SEMO – Chance Wilson had a 7-yard run (Justin Keller kick), 10:39. Cyclones 14–7. Drive: 11 plays, 75 yards, 6:48.
- ISU – Aiden Flora 11-yard run (Kyle Konrardy kick), 4:54. Cyclones 21–7. Drive: 4 plays, 40 yards, 1:58.
- ISU – Easton Miller 10-yard pass from Jaylen Raynor (Kyle Konrardy kick), 2:50. Cyclones 28–7. Drive: 3 plays, 55 yards, 1:24.

Third quarter

- ISU – Kyle Konrardy 33-yard field goal, 1:47. Cyclones 31–7. Drive: 9 plays, 30 yards, 4:54.

Fourth quarter

- SEMO – Justin Keller 40-yard field goal, 13:20. Cyclones 31–10. Drive: 7 plays, 53 yards, 3:27.
- ISU – Jaylen Raynor 7-yard run (Kyle Konrardy kick), 10:41. Cyclones 38–10. Drive: 7 plays, 75 yards, 2:38.

| Statistics | SEMO | ISU |
|---|---|---|
| First downs | 14 | 15 |
| Plays–yards | 67–209 | 48–303 |
| Rushes–yards | 45–67 | 31–108 |
| Passing yards | 142 | 195 |
| Passing: comp–att–int | 17–22–1 | 9–17–0 |
| Turnovers | 3 | 1 |
| Time of possession | 36:52 | 23:08 |

| Team | Category | Player | Statistics |
|---|---|---|---|
| Southeast Missouri State | Passing | Braylen Ragland | 17/22, 142 yards, INT |
| Southeast Missouri State | Rushing | Khyair Spain | 16 carries, 72 yards |
| Southeast Missouri State | Receiving | Jobe Bryant | 7 receptions, 40 yards |
| Iowa State | Passing | Jaylen Raynor | 8/16, 184 yards, 2 TD |
| Iowa State | Rushing | Aiden Flora | 7 carries, 45 yards, TD |
| Iowa State | Receiving | Dominic Overby | 2 receptions, 85 yards |

=== at No. 21 Iowa (Cy–Hawk Trophy) ===
Iowa State Cyclones (1–0) at No. 21 Iowa Hawkeyes (1–0) – Game summary

| Quarter | 1 | 2 | 3 | 4 | Total |
|---|---|---|---|---|---|
| Cyclones | 0 | 10 | 3 | 0 | 13 |
| No. 21 Hawkeyes | 0 | 10 | 0 | 6 | 16 |

at Kinnick Stadium • Iowa City, Iowa

- Date: September 12
- Game time: 6:30 p.m. CDT
- Game weather: 77 °F (25 °C), Sunny, Wind NW 8 mph (13 km/h)
- Game attendance: 69,250
- Referee: Kevin Mar
- TV announcers (NBC): Paul Burmeister, Todd Blackledge, and Kathryn Tappen

Game information

First quarter

- No scoring plays.

Second quarter

- 14:17 ISU – Kyle Konrardy has a 29-yard field goal (Drive: 9 plays, 34 yards, 4:34; ISU 3–0)
- 7:51 ISU – Vince Benetti 4-yard pass from Jaylen Raynor (Kyle Konrardy kick) (Drive: 10 plays, 66 yards, 5:34; ISU 10–0)
- 5:34 IOWA – Hank Brown 1-yard run (Caden Buhr kick) (Drive: 5 plays, 75 yards, 2:17; ISU 10–7)
- 0:28 IOWA – Caden Buhr with a 45-yard field goal (Drive: 10 plays, 46 yards, 3:29; Tied 10–10)

Third quarter

- 10:06 ISU – Kyle Konrardy 51-yard field goal (Drive: 8 plays, 41 yards, 4:54; ISU 13–10)

Fourth quarter

- 6:22 IOWA – Caden Buhr 32-yard field goal (Drive: 11 plays, 43 yards, 6:10; Tied 13–13)
- 0:15 IOWA – Caden Buhr 42-yard field goal (Drive: 9 plays, 31 yards, 4:13; Iowa 16–13)

| Statistics | ISU | IOWA |
|---|---|---|
| First downs | 9 | 13 |
| Plays–yards | 53–255 | 59–284 |
| Rushes–yards | 34–138 | 29–93 |
| Passing yards | 117 | 191 |
| Passing: comp–att–int | 10–19–0 | 21–30–0 |
| Turnovers | 0 | 0 |
| Time of possession | 30:18 | 29:42 |

| Team | Category | Player | Statistics |
|---|---|---|---|
| Iowa State | Passing | Jaylen Raynor | 10/19, 117 yards, TD |
| Iowa State | Rushing | Aiden Flora | 19 carries, 89 yards |
| Iowa State | Receiving | Omari Hayes | 3 receptions, 39 yards |
| Iowa | Passing | Hank Brown | 21/30, 191 yards |
| Iowa | Rushing | Kamari Moulton | 15 carries, 57 yards |
| Iowa | Receiving | Tony Diaz | 8 receptions, 95 yards |

=== vs. Bowling Green ===
Bowling Green Falcons (0–2) at Iowa State Cyclones (1–1) – Game summary

| Quarter | 1 | 2 | 3 | 4 | Total |
|---|---|---|---|---|---|
| Falcons | 7 | 0 | 0 | 0 | 7 |
| Cyclones | 21 | 14 | 10 | 10 | 55 |

at Jack Trice Stadium • Ames, Iowa

- Date: September 19
- Game time: 11:00 a.m. CDT
- Game weather: Cloudy • Temperature: 74 °F (23 °C) • Wind: SE at 7 miles per hour (11 km/h)
- Game attendance: 50,395
- Referee: Rick Warne
- TV announcers (ESPNU): Courtney Lyle and Rene Ingoglia

Game information

First quarter

- (5:28) ISU – Jamal Polite with a 34-yard pass from Jaylen Raynor (Kyle Konrardy kick) (Drive: 3 plays, 80 yards, 00:48, Iowa State 7–0)
- (3:58) BGSU – Winn Sharp has a 59-yard pass from Jay Kastantin (Travis Kenner kick) (Drive: 3 plays, 75 yards, 01:30, Tied 7–7)
- (3:45) ISU – Cameron Pettaway 100-yard kickoff return (Kyle Konrardy kick) (Iowa State 14–7)
- (0:19) ISU – Aiden Flora 61-yard run (Kyle Konrardy kick) (Drive: 1 play, 61 yards, 00:11, Iowa State 21–7)

Second quarter

- (9:47) ISU – Arnold Barnes 3-yard run (Kyle Konrardy kick) (Drive: 5 plays, 56 yards, 02:27, Iowa State 28–7)
- (5:12) ISU – Aiden Flora 42-yard run (Kyle Konrardy kick) (Drive: 5 plays, 58 yards, 02:15, Iowa State 35–7)

Third quarter

- (9:16) ISU – Kyle Konrardy 39-yard field goal (Drive: 10 plays, 46 yards, 05:37, Iowa State 38–7)
- (8:07) ISU – Aiden Flora 66-yard punt return (Kyle Konrardy kick) (Iowa State 45–7)

Fourth quarter

- (8:27) ISU – Arnold Barnes 8-yard run (Kyle Konrardy kick) (Drive: 14 plays, 92 yards, 07:51, Iowa State 52–7)
- (2:22) ISU – Kyle Konrardy 40-yard field goal (Drive: 7 plays, 19 yards, 04:11, Iowa State 55–7)

| Statistics | BGSU | ISU |
|---|---|---|
| First downs | 10 | 25 |
| Plays–yards | 52–186 | 64–507 |
| Rushes–yards | 30–90 | 46–365 |
| Passing yards | 96 | 142 |
| Passing: comp–att–int | 9–22–1 | 12–18–1 |
| Turnovers | 2 | 1 |
| Time of possession | 27:11 | 32:49 |

| Team | Category | Player | Statistics |
|---|---|---|---|
| Bowling Green | Passing | Jay Kastantin | 8/17, 97 yards, TD, INT |
| Bowling Green | Rushing | Ke'Marion Baldwin | 6 carries, 38 yards |
| Bowling Green | Receiving | Winn Sharp | 1 reception, 59 yards, TD |
| Iowa State | Passing | Jaylen Raynor | 11/17, 133 yards, TD, INT |
| Iowa State | Rushing | Aiden Flora | 12 carries, 194 yards, 2 TD |
| Iowa State | Receiving | Jamal Polite | 1 reception, 34 yards, TD |

Iowa State entered the game 1–1 after defeating Southeast Missouri State in its season opener and losing to rival Iowa on a last-second field goal the previous week. The Cyclones defeated Bowling Green 55–7 in the third meeting between the programs, having won the previous two, with the most recent coming in 1979. Arkansas State transfer quarterback Jaylen Raynor made his 39th career start and had previously defeated Bowling Green in the 2024 68 Ventures Bowl. Iowa State also featured two former Bowling Green players in running back Cameron Pettaway, the 2025 MAC Freshman of the Year and a first-team All-MAC kick returner, and cornerback Keyon Washington.

Iowa State took an early lead on a 34-yard touchdown pass from Raynor to Jamal Polite before Bowling Green tied the game on a 59-yard touchdown pass from Jay Kastantin to Winn Sharp on a slant route. On the play, Iowa State defensive backs Jaheim Singletary and Willie Breland III collided; Singletary was hospitalized and later diagnosed with a concussion and stiff neck before being released. Pettaway then returned the ensuing kickoff 100 yards for an Iowa State-record touchdown, beginning a 48–0 Cyclones scoring run. Aiden Flora rushed for a career-high 194 yards and two touchdowns on 12 carries and added a 66-yard punt-return touchdown, marking the first time in Iowa State history the Cyclones recorded both a kickoff-return and punt-return touchdown in the same game. Flora was named to the Paul Hornung Award Honor Roll and received the Burlsworth Trophy's Walk-On of the Week honor. Arnold Barnes III also rushed for two touchdowns. Bowling Green replaced Kastantin with Austin Novosad to begin the second half after Kastantin committed two first-half turnovers, but Novosad completed only one of five passes. Iowa State outgained Bowling Green 507–186. Drey Braxton recorded Bowling Green's lone interception, while Dorian Pringle led the Falcons with nine tackles.

=== vs. No. 15 Utah ===
No. 15 Utah Utes (3–0) at Iowa State Cyclones (2–1) – Game summary

| Quarter | 1 | 2 | 3 | 4 | Total |
|---|---|---|---|---|---|
| No. 15 Utes | 14 | 10 | 0 | 7 | 31 |
| Cyclones | 0 | 3 | 7 | 7 | 17 |

at Jack Trice Stadium • Ames, Iowa

- Date: September 26
- Game time: 2:30 p.m. CDT
- Game weather: Cloudy • Temperature: 62 °F (17 °C) • Wind: SE 11 mph
- Game attendance: 52,150
- Referee: Henry Johns
- TV announcers (FOX): Tim Brando, Devin Gardner, and Josh Sims

Game information

First quarter

- UTAH - Wayshawn Parker 54-yard run (Dillon Curtis kick), 14:44. Utes 7–0. Drive: 1 plays, 54 yards, 0:10.
- UTAH - Braden Pegan 24-yard pass from Devon Dampier (Dillon Curtis kick), 2:32. Utes 14–0. Drive: 9 plays, 90 yards, 4:02.

Second quarter

- UTAH - Dillon Curtis 27-yard field goal, 10:14. Utes 17–0. Drive: 10 plays, 39 yards, 4:59.
- ISU - Kyle Konrardy 47-yard field goal, 3:50. Utes 17–3. Drive: 13 plays, 46 yards, 6:24.
- UTAH - Wayshawn Parker 1-yard run (Dillon Curtis kick), 1:35. Utes 24–3. Drive: 8 plays, 75 yards, 2:15.

Third quarter

- ISU - Jaylen Raynor 8-yard run (Kyle Konrardy kick), 8:00. Utes 24–10. Drive: 12 plays, 82 yards, 6:54.

Fourth quarter

- ISU - Dominic Overby 22-yard pass from Jaylen Raynor (Kyle Konrardy kick), 10:48. Utes 24–17. Drive: 11 plays, 81 yards, 4:42.
- UTAH - Wayshawn Parker 13-yard pass from Devon Dampier (Dillon Curtis kick), 2:58. Utes 31–17. Drive: 7 plays, 61 yards, 4:28.

| Statistics | UTAH | ISU |
|---|---|---|
| First downs | 21 | 23 |
| Plays–yards | 60–411 | 73–316 |
| Rushes–yards | 33–205 | 33–111 |
| Passing yards | 206 | 205 |
| Passing: comp–att–int | 18–27–0 | 21–40–2 |
| Turnovers | 0 | 2 |
| Time of possession | 28:04 | 31:56 |

| Team | Category | Player | Statistics |
|---|---|---|---|
| Utah | Passing | Devon Dampier | 18/27, 206 yards, 2 TD |
| Utah | Rushing | Wayshawn Parker | 18 carries, 175 yards, 2 TD |
| Utah | Receiving | Wayshawn Parker | 5 receptions, 65 yards, TD |
| Iowa State | Passing | Jaylen Raynor | 21/40, 205 yards, TD, 2 INT |
| Iowa State | Rushing | Aiden Flora | 13 carries, 57 yards |
| Iowa State | Receiving | Omari Hayes | 5 receptions 55 yards |

=== vs. West Virginia ===
West Virginia Mountaineers (0–0) at Iowa State Cyclones (0–0) – Game summary

| Quarter | 1 | 2 | 3 | 4 | Total |
|---|---|---|---|---|---|
| Mountaineers | 7 | 7 | 14 | 14 | 42 |
| Cyclones | 7 | 14 | 7 | 17 | 45 |

at Jack Trice Stadium • Ames, Iowa

- Date: October 3
- Game time: 11:00 a.m. CDT
- Game attendance: 52,724
- TV announcers (TNT): J. B. Long, Mike Golic Jr., and Jared Greenberg

| Statistics | WVU | ISU |
|---|---|---|
| First downs | 19 | 29 |
| Plays–yards | 63–518 | 76–577 |
| Rushes–yards | 40–291 | 47–265 |
| Passing yards | 227 | 312 |
| Passing: comp–att–int | 11–23–0 | 21–29–1 |
| Turnovers | 2 | 1 |
| Time of possession | 21:46 | 38:14 |

| Team | Category | Player | Statistics |
|---|---|---|---|
| West Virginia | Passing | Michael Hawkins Jr. | 11/23, 227 yards, 2 TD |
| West Virginia | Rushing | Michael Hawkins Jr. | 20 carries, 149 yards, 2 TD |
| West Virginia | Receiving | DJ Epps | 4 receptions, 114 yards, TD |
| Iowa State | Passing | Jaylen Raynor | 19/27, 264 yards, TD, INT |
| Iowa State | Rushing | Aiden Flora | 22 carries, 212 yards, 3 TD |
| Iowa State | Receiving | Cody Jackson | 6 receptions, 160 yards, TD |

=== at No. 8 BYU ===
Iowa State Cyclones (3–2) at No. 8 BYU Cougars (4–0) – Game summary

| Quarter | 1 | 2 | 3 | 4 | Total |
|---|---|---|---|---|---|
| Cyclones | 0 | 3 | 0 | 7 | 10 |
| No. 8 Cougars | 7 | 7 | 7 | 3 | 24 |

at LaVell Edwards Stadium • Provo, Utah

- Date: October 9
- Game time: 9:15 p.m. CDT / 8:15 p.m. MDT
- Game weather: Clear w/ showers on and off • Temperature: 75 °F (24 °C) • Wind: NW 9 mph (14 km/h)
- Game attendance: 64,632
- Referee: Tutashinda Salaam
- TV announcers (ESPN): Anish Shroff, Andre Ware, and Morgan Uber

Game information

First quarter

- BYU – 8:52 Journee Tonga 6-yard run (Matthias Dunn kick). BYU 7–0. Drive: 10 plays, 75 yards, 6:08.

Second quarter

- ISU – 14:01 Kyle Konrardy 40-yard Field Goal. BYU 7–3. Drive: 11 plays, 33 yards, 4:50.
- BYU – 1:51 Kyler Kasper 5-yard pass from Bear Bachmeier (Matthias Dunn kick). BYU 14–3. Drive: 4 plays, 71 yards, 0:53.

Third quarter

- BYU – 1:09 Legend Glasker 75-yard pass from Bear Bachmeier (Matthias Dunn kick). BYU 21–3. Drive: 3 plays, 79 yards, 1:25.

Fourth quarter

- ISU – 12:51 Christian Greenlaw 1-yard pass from Jaylen Raynor (Kyle Konrardy kick). BYU 21–10. Drive: 6 plays, 49 yards, 1:56.
- BYU – 1:51 Matthias Dunn 38-yard Field Goal. BYU 24–10. Drive: 6 plays, 52 yards, 1:56.

| Statistics | ISU | BYU |
|---|---|---|
| First downs | 56 | 61 |
| Plays–yards | 56–200 | 61–506 |
| Rushes–yards | 27–102 | 31–177 |
| Passing yards | 98 | 329 |
| Passing: comp–att–int | 16–29–0 | 22–30–0 |
| Turnovers | 0 | 1 |
| Time of possession | 27:17 | 32:43 |

| Team | Category | Player | Statistics |
|---|---|---|---|
| Iowa State | Passing | Jaylen Raynor | 16/29, 98 yards, TD |
| Iowa State | Rushing | Aiden Flora | 17 carries, 86 yards |
| Iowa State | Receiving | Ty Claiborne | 3 receptions, 31 yards |
| BYU | Passing | Bear Bachmeier | 22/30, 329 yards, 2 TD |
| BYU | Rushing | Bear Bachmeier | 9 carries, 109 yards |
| BYU | Receiving | Legend Glasker | 5 receptions, 99 yards, TD |

=== at No. 25 Arizona ===
Iowa State Cyclones (3–3) at No. 25 Arizona Wildcats (5–1) – Game summary

| Quarter | 1 | 2 | 3 | 4 | Total |
|---|---|---|---|---|---|
| Cyclones | 3 | 0 | 0 | 0 | 3 |
| No. 25 Wildcats | 15 | 10 | 0 | 14 | 39 |

at Casino Del Sol Stadium • Tucson, Arizona

- Date: October 24
- Game time: 6:30 p.m. CDT / 4:30 p.m. MST
- Game weather: Sunny, 73 °F (23 °C)
- Game attendance: 45,477
- Referee: Luke Richmond
- TV announcers (ESPN2): Lowell Galindo, Kirk Morrison, and Dawn Davenport

Game information

First quarter

- (14:29) ARIZ – Isaiah Mizell 71-yard pass from Noah Fifita, Henry Gabalis two-point pass to Tyler Powell (Drive: 2 plays, 75 yards, 0:31; Arizona 8–0)
- (9:45) ARIZ – Quincy Craig 6-yard run, Michael Salgado-Medina kick (Drive: 13 plays, 80 yards, 6:53; Arizona 15–0)
- (1:06) ISU – Kyle Konrardy 40-yard field goal (Drive: 7 plays, 53 yards, 4:45; Arizona 15–3)

Second quarter

- (12:54) ARIZ – Michael Salgado-Medina 53-yard field goal (Drive: 8 plays, 39 yards, 3:12; Arizona 18–3)
- (1:55) ARIZ – Kedrick Reescano 5-yard run, Michael Salgado-Medina kick (Drive: 15 plays, 80 yards, 7:20; Arizona 25–3)

Third quarter

- No scoring plays

Fourth quarter

- (6:41) ARIZ – Henry Gabalis 40-yard pass from Noah Fifita, Michael Salgado-Medina kick (Drive: 8 plays, 78 yards, 4:29; Arizona 32–3)
- (1:55) ARIZ – Sawyer Anderson 4-yard run, Ian French kick (Drive: 6 plays, 36 yards, 3:09; Arizona 39–3)

| Statistics | ISU | ARIZ |
|---|---|---|
| First downs | 14 | 24 |
| Plays–yards | 58–221 | 73–477 |
| Rushes–yards | 31–52 | 36–141 |
| Passing yards | 169 | 336 |
| Passing: comp–att–int | 15–27–0 | 30–37–0 |
| Turnovers | 1 | 0 |
| Time of possession | 25:34 | 34:26 |

| Team | Category | Player | Statistics |
|---|---|---|---|
| Iowa State | Passing | Jaylen Raynor | 8/10, 106 yards |
| Iowa State | Rushing | Aiden Flora | 12 carries, 36 yards |
| Iowa State | Receiving | Vince Benetti | 3 receptions, 42 yards |
| Arizona | Passing | Noah Fifita | 27/34, 308 yards, 2 TD |
| Arizona | Rushing | Quincy Craig | 9 carries, 51 yards, TD |
| Arizona | Receiving | Isaiah Mizell | 8 receptions, 134 yards, TD |

=== vs. No. 24 Oklahoma State ===
No. 24 Oklahoma State Cowboys (5–2) at Iowa State Cyclones (3–4) – Game summary

| Quarter | 1 | 2 | 3 | 4 | Total |
|---|---|---|---|---|---|
| No. 24 Cowboys | 14 | 7 | 7 | 21 | 49 |
| Cyclones | 7 | 17 | 14 | 13 | 51 |

at Jack Trice Stadium • Ames, Iowa

- Date: October 31
- Game time: 6:00 p.m. CDT
- Game weather: Cloudy • Temperature: 62 °F (17 °C) • Wind: SE 2 mph
- Game attendance: 50,295
- Referee: Michael McCabe
- TV announcers (FOX): Tim Brando, Devin Gardner, and Josh Sims
- Box score, Recap

| Statistics | OKST | ISU |
|---|---|---|
| First downs | 27 | 24 |
| Plays–yards | 74–533 | 72–581 |
| Rushes–yards | 32–210 | 44–272 |
| Passing yards | 323 | 309 |
| Passing: comp–att–int | 27–42–1 | 18–28–1 |
| Turnovers | 2 | 1 |
| Time of possession | 25:13 | 34:47 |

| Team | Category | Player | Statistics |
|---|---|---|---|
| Oklahoma State | Passing | Drew Mestemaker | 27/42, 323 yards, 5 TD, INT |
| Oklahoma State | Rushing | Caleb Hawkins | 25 carries, 194 yards, 2 TD |
| Oklahoma State | Receiving | Justin Bowick | 7 receptions, 124 yards, 2 TD |
| Iowa State | Passing | Jaylen Raynor | 18/28, 309 yards, 3 TD, INT |
| Iowa State | Rushing | Aiden Flora | 29 carries, 221 yards, 2 TD |
| Iowa State | Receiving | Jamal Polite Jr. | 6 receptions, 171 yards, TD |

=== at Baylor ===
Iowa State Cyclones (0–0) at Baylor Bears (0–0) – Game summary

| Quarter | 1 | 2 | 3 | 4 | Total |
|---|---|---|---|---|---|
| Cyclones | 0 | 0 | 0 | 0 | 0 |
| Bears | 0 | 0 | 0 | 0 | 0 |

at McLane Stadium • Waco, Texas

- Date: November 7
- Game time: 11:00 a.m. CST
- Game attendance: 39,229
- TV announcers (FS1): Eric Collins and Spencer Tillman

| Statistics | ISU | BAY |
|---|---|---|
| First downs | | |
| Plays–yards | | |
| Rushes–yards | | |
| Passing yards | | |
| Passing: comp–att–int | | |
| Turnovers | | |
| Time of possession | | |

| Team | Category | Player | Statistics |
|---|---|---|---|
| Iowa State | Passing | | |
| Iowa State | Rushing | | |
| Iowa State | Receiving | | |
| Baylor | Passing | | |
| Baylor | Rushing | | |
| Baylor | Receiving | | |

=== vs. Cincinnati ===
Cincinnati Bearcats (5–4) at Iowa State Cyclones (4–5) – Game summary

| Quarter | 1 | 2 | 3 | 4 | Total |
|---|---|---|---|---|---|
| Bearcats | 7 | 6 | 0 | 0 | 13 |
| Cyclones | 21 | 10 | 0 | 10 | 41 |

at Jack Trice Stadium • Ames, Iowa

- Date: November 14
- Game time: 11:00 a.m. CST
- TV announcers (TNT/TruTV): J. B. Long and Mike Golic Jr.

| Statistics | CIN | ISU |
|---|---|---|
| First downs | | |
| Plays–yards | | |
| Rushes–yards | | |
| Passing yards | | |
| Passing: comp–att–int | | |
| Turnovers | | |
| Time of possession | | |

| Team | Category | Player | Statistics |
|---|---|---|---|
| Cincinnati | Passing | | |
| Cincinnati | Rushing | | |
| Cincinnati | Receiving | | |
| Iowa State | Passing | | |
| Iowa State | Rushing | | |
| Iowa State | Receiving | | |

=== at UCF ===
Iowa State Cyclones (5–5) at UCF Knights (5–5) – Game summary

| Quarter | 1 | 2 | 3 | 4 | Total |
|---|---|---|---|---|---|
| Cyclones | 3 | 7 | 7 | 0 | 17 |
| Knights | 3 | 21 | 7 | 17 | 48 |

at Acrisure Bounce House • Orlando, Florida

- Date: November 20
- Game time: 5:00 p.m. CST / 6:00 p.m. EST
- Referee: Kevin Boitmann
- TV announcers (FS1): Noah Reed and Petros Papadakis

| Statistics | ISU | UCF |
|---|---|---|
| First downs | | |
| Plays–yards | | |
| Rushes–yards | | |
| Passing yards | | |
| Passing: comp–att–int | | |
| Turnovers | | |
| Time of possession | | |

| Team | Category | Player | Statistics |
|---|---|---|---|
| Iowa State | Passing | | |
| Iowa State | Rushing | | |
| Iowa State | Receiving | | |
| UCF | Passing | | |
| UCF | Rushing | | |
| UCF | Receiving | | |

=== vs. Kansas State ===
Kansas State Wildcats (0–0) at Iowa State Cyclones (0–0) – Game summary

| Quarter | 1 | 2 | 3 | 4 | Total |
|---|---|---|---|---|---|
| Wildcats | 0 | 0 | 0 | 0 | 0 |
| Cyclones | 0 | 0 | 0 | 0 | 0 |

at Jack Trice Stadium • Ames, Iowa

- Date: November 28
- Game time: 1:00 p.m.
- TV: ESPN+

| Statistics | KSU | ISU |
|---|---|---|
| First downs | | |
| Plays–yards | | |
| Rushes–yards | | |
| Passing yards | | |
| Passing: comp–att–int | | |
| Turnovers | | |
| Time of possession | | |

| Team | Category | Player | Statistics |
|---|---|---|---|
| Kansas State | Passing | | |
| Kansas State | Rushing | | |
| Kansas State | Receiving | | |
| Iowa State | Passing | | |
| Iowa State | Rushing | | |
| Iowa State | Receiving | | |

== Roster ==
2026 roster
| Quarterbacks: 1 Jaylen Raynor – Sr.; 5 Connor Moberly – (redshirt) So.; 6 Zane Flores – (redshirt) So.; 16 Wyatt Bohm – (redshirt) Jr.; 18 Hudson Kurland – Fr.; Running backs: 0 Cameron Pettaway – (redshirt) So.; 3 Arnold Barnes III - Sr.; 7 Salahadin Allah - (redshirt) So.; 20 Caleb Francois - Fr.; 21 Aiden Flora – (redshirt) So.; 22 Ryver Peppers - (redshirt) Fr.; 25 Easton Miller - (redshirt) Jr.; 27 Gabriel Wilson - Fr.; 44 Wyatt Archer - (redshirt) Jr.; Wide receivers: 2 Cody Jackson – (redshirt) Sr.; 4 Carter Pabst – So.; 8 Evan Boyd – (redshirt) Jr.; 9 Omari Hayes – (redshirt) Sr.; 11 Dominic Overby – (redshirt) So.; 12 Braden Goellner – (redshirt) Sr.; 13 Jamal Polite Jr. - Fr.; 17 Jordyn Bailey – (redshirt) Jr.; 23 Carson Robbins – (redshirt) So.; 33 Zach Eskildsen - Fr.; 34 Jeffrey Roberts - Fr.; 80 Malcolm Watkins - Fr.; 82 Trevor Fortenberry – (redshirt) Jr.; 83 Sam Zelenovich – (redshirt) Fr.; 86 Ray Coffey – (redshirt) Sr.; 89 Ty Claiborne – (redshirt) Sr.; Tight ends: 10 Cash Hayden – (redshirt) So.; 14 Drake DeBaun – Fr.; 19 Tyler Fortenberry – (redshirt) Sr.; 37 Vince Benetti – (redshirt) Jr.; 39 AJ Petersen - (redshirt) Jr.; 40 Carson Edney – Fr.; 41 Rylan Barnes – (redshirt) Jr.; 45 Gavin Proudfoot – (redshirt) Sr. OL/TE; 48 Jack Bjorn – (redshirt) Sr.; 81 Luke Galer – Fr.; 84 Drew Byrd – Fr.; 85 Keaton Roskop – (redshirt) So.; 87 Jordan Vyborny – (redshirt) Fr.; 88 Christian Greenlaw – (redshirt) Jr. | Offensive line: 45 Gavin Proudfoot – (redshirt) Sr. OL/TE; 51 Maasai King – (redshirt) Sr.; 52 Kingston Fotualii – Fr.; 54 Cade Myer – (redshirt) Sr.; 55 Trevor Bindel – (redshirt) Fr.; 56 Colin Amick – (redshirt) So.; 61 Benji Makelela – Fr.; 62 Braden Simonsen – (redshirt) Sr.; 63 Braden Smith – (redshirt) So.; 64 Brady Harr – Fr.; 65 Garret Rutledge – (redshirt) So.; 66 Derek Worden – Fr.; 68 Makai Sat – (redshirt) Jr.; 69 Dontrell Holt – (redshirt) So.; 71 Gabriel Greenlee – (redshirt) Sr.; 72 Austin Barrett – (redshirt) Jr.; 74 Gavin Broscious – (redshirt) Jr.; 77 Caden Maas – (redshirt) Jr.; 78 DeAndre Carter – (redshirt) So.; 79 Jake Taylor – (redshirt) Jr.; Long snappers: 56 Caleb Schmidt – Jr.; 57 Gavin Schieler – (redshirt) Fr.; 60 Jacob Lyftogt – (redshirt) Jr.; Defensive line: 0 Zaimir Hawk – (redshirt) Jr.; 13 Kaleb Bilal-Jones – (redshirt) Fr.; 44 Trey Verdon – (redshirt) Fr.; 47 Tyler Burnstein – Fr.; 50 Jack Limbaugh – (redshirt) Fr.; 53 Jaden Weaver – Fr.; 55 Jace Gilbert – (redshirt) So.; 57 Ajibola Afuye – Fr.; 59 Daniel Howard – Fr.; 88 Isaac Terrell – Sr.; 89 Donovan Fitzmaurice – So.; 90 Jareb Ramos – (redshirt) Sr.; 91 Blake Hawkins – (redshirt) So.; 92 Caden Crawford – (redshirt) Sr.; 93 Jack Janikowski – (redshirt) Jr.; 94 Jake Jones – Fr.; 95 Ka'Mori Moore – (redshirt) Fr.; 96 Chet Andrews – (redshirt) Sr.; 97 Max Baloun – (redshirt) Sr.; 98 Malaki Ta'ase – Jr.; 99 Bryson Lamb – (redshirt) Sr. | Linebackers: 7 Sullivan Schlimgen – So.; 8 Tristan Exline – Sr.; 10 Carson Willich – (redshirt) Sr.; 11 Willie Breland III – Jr.; 12 Ethan Stecker – (redshirt) Fr.; 16 Malcolm Jones – (redshirt) Sr.; 17 Connor Welsch – (redshirt) So.; 31 Montreze Smith Jr. – (redshirt) So.; 34 Beau Goodwin – Jr.; 36 Bradley Esser – Fr.; 40 Landon Kalsbeck – Fr.; Cornerbacks: 1 Keyon Washington – (redshirt) So.; 2 Braden Awls – Sr.; 3 Seth Johnson – (redshirt) So.; 4 Micah Harper – (redshirt) Sr.; 5 Beni Ngoyi – (redshirt) Jr.; 6 Drew Surges – (redshirt) Jr.; 9 Jaheim Singletary – (redshirt) Sr.; 14 Damarius Russell – (redshirt) Fr.; 18 David Coffey – (redshirt) So.; 19 Eddie Lemos – (redshirt) Sr.; 20 Trillion Sorrell – (redshirt) Fr.; 21 Duhron Goodman – (redshirt) Sr.; 22 Xavier Martinez – Sr.; 24 Brody Miller – (redshirt) Fr.; 26 Tyrone Cotton III – (redshirt) Fr.; 29 Toe Sanders – Fr.; 32 Angelo Jackson – (redshirt) So.; 33 Brady Hummel – Fr.; 35 Tayten Duncan – Fr.; 38 Amiri Barnes – Fr.; 42 Matthew McClain – Fr.; 43 Caden Matson – (redshirt) Sr.; Punters/Kickers: 93 Greg Hubbard – Fr.; 94 Chase Smith – So.; 95 Ethan Gurney – Fr.; 97 Kyle Konrardy – (redshirt) Jr.; 98 Adlai Lounsbury – (redshirt) Fr.; 99 Jonah DuPont – (redshirt) So. |
