= Aiden Flora =

American football player

- Flora in 2026

No. 21 – Iowa State Cyclones
- Position: Running back
- Class: Redshirt Sophomore

Personal information
- Listed height: 6 ft 0 in (1.83 m)
- Listed weight: 195 lb (88 kg)

Career information
- High school: Adel–De Soto–Minburn (Adel, Iowa)
- College: Iowa State (2024–present)

Awards and highlights
- Second-team All-Big 12 (2025)
- Stats at ESPN

Aiden Flora is an American college football running back for the Iowa State Cyclones.

== Early life and high school ==
Flora attended Adel–De Soto–Minburn High School in Adel, Iowa. Coming out of high school, he committed to play college football for the Iowa State Cyclones.

== College career ==
Aiden Flora runs with the football during a game against West Virginia on October 3, 2026 in Jack Trice Stadium in Ames, Iowa.

Flora joined Iowa State as a preferred walk-on and redshirted his first season, joining a running back room that included Carson Hansen and Abu Sama. He made his collegiate debut in Week 3 against Arkansas State, recording six carries for 27 yards and an eight-yard touchdown run in the victory. The Cyclones finished the season 11–3, reaching the Big 12 Championship Game against Arizona State and defeating Miami 42–41 in the Pop-Tarts Bowl. As Flora appeared in four regular-season games and two postseason games, he was able to retain his redshirt. He appeared in six games overall, rushing 11 times for 53 yards and a touchdown while also recording one reception for six yards.

As a redshirt freshman, Flora continued to serve as a backup in a crowded running back room, primarily contributing as a special teams returner. In the 2025 season opener against rival Kansas State in the Aer Lingus College Football Classic in Dublin, Ireland, Flora recovered a muffed punt by Wildcats returner Dylan Edwards in a 24–21 victory. For his performance, he was named Big 12 Special Teams Player of the Week. In Week 10 he recorded a go-ahead 79-yard punt return touchdown in the fourth quarter against TCU in a 20–17 victory, earning co-Big 12 Special Teams Player of the Week honors. The following week against Kansas, he scored on a 38-yard touchdown run in a 38–14 win. On the season, he appeared in 10 games, recording four carries for 58 yards and a touchdown while adding two receptions for 25 yards. As a returner, he recorded eight punt returns for 209 yards, averaging 26.1 yards per return with a touchdown, and returned eight kickoffs for 171 yards. He was named second-team All-Big 12 as a return specialist. Iowa State finished the season 8–4 and opted out of a bowl game.

Following the season, head coach Matt Campbell left the program to become the head coach at Penn State. Hansen followed Campbell to Penn State, while Sama transferred to Wisconsin.

Ahead of the 2026 season, first-year head coach Jimmy Rogers awarded Flora a scholarship and named him the team's starting running back. In his first career start, the season opener against Southeast Missouri State, Flora recorded seven carries for 45 yards and a touchdown in the victory. In Week 2, Flora rushed for 89 yards on 19 carries in a loss to rival Iowa. The following week against Bowling Green, he rushed 12 times for 194 yards and two touchdowns and added a 66-yard punt-return touchdown in a 55–7 victory. Teammate Cammeron Pettaway also returned a kickoff for a touchdown, marking the first time in program history that Iowa State recorded both a punt-return and kickoff-return touchdown in the same game. For his performance, Flora was named to the Paul Hornung Award Honor Roll and selected as the Burlsworth Trophy Walk-On of the Week. In Week 4 against West Virginia, Flora rushed 22 times for 212 yards and three touchdowns, including a go-ahead two-yard touchdown run with under two minutes remaining. He also completed both of his pass attempts for 48 yards and two touchdowns in a 45–42 victory. He became the ninth FBS player since 1996 to record at least 200 rushing yards, three rushing touchdowns and two passing touchdowns in a game. He was also the first non-quarterback to accomplish the feat. For his performance, he was named the Associated Press National Player of the Week, Big 12 Offensive Player of the Week and Burlsworth Trophy Walk-On of the Week.

=== Statistics ===
Year	Team	Games		Rushing				Receiving				Punt returns			
Year	Team	GP	GS	Att	Yds	Avg	TD	Rec	Yds	Avg	TD	Ret	Yds	Avg	TD
2024	Iowa State	6	0	11	53	4.8	1	1	6	6.0	0	0	0	0.0	0
2025	Iowa State	10	0	4	58	14.5	1	2	25	12.5	0	8	209	26.1	1
2026	Iowa State	10	10	185	1,335	7.2	12	21	138	6.6	0	10	146	14.6	1
Career		26	10	200	1,446	7.2	14	24	169	7.0	0	18	355	19.7	2
