= Jaylen Raynor =

American football player

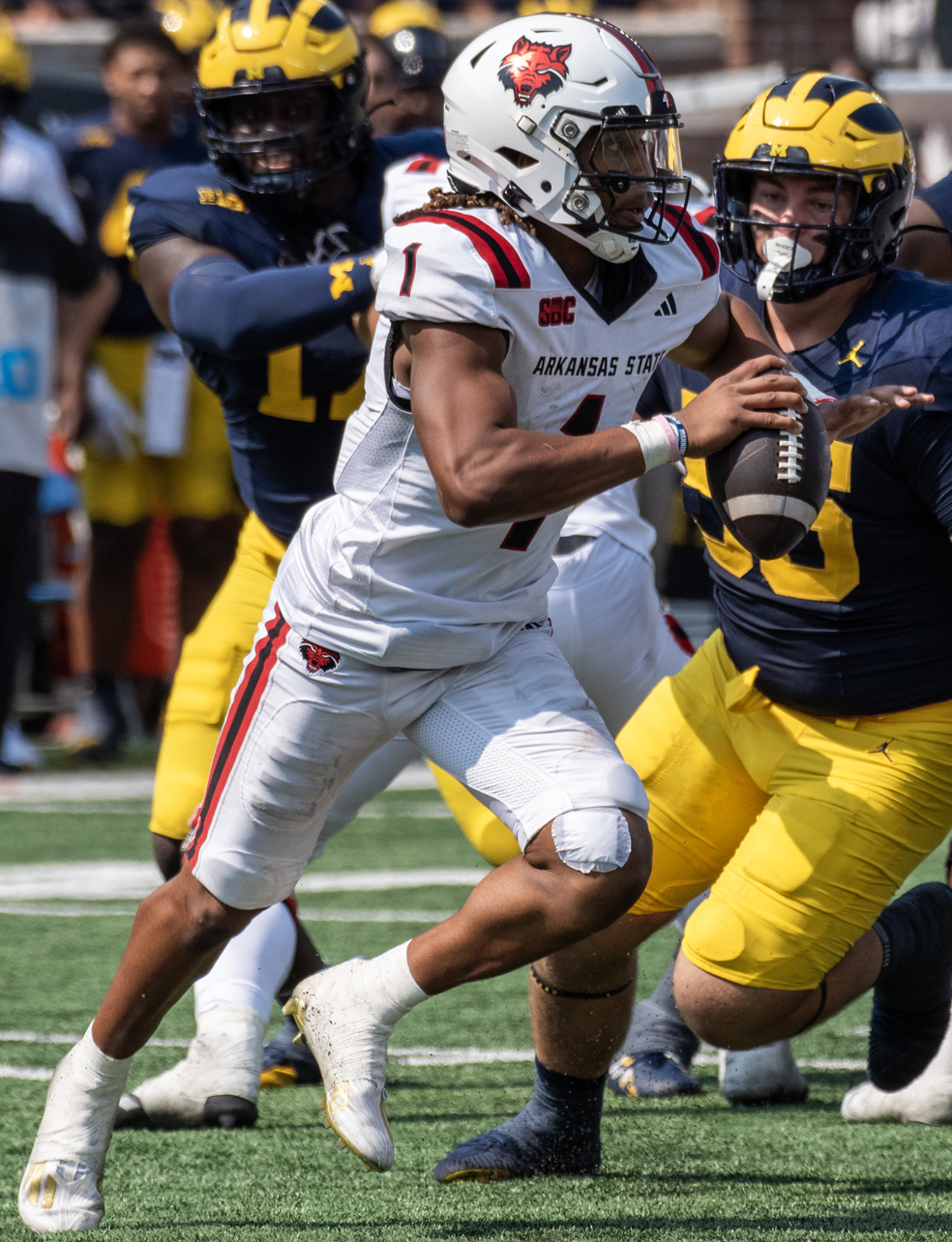
- Raynor with Arkansas State in 2024

No. 1 – Iowa State Cyclones
- Position: Quarterback
- Class: Senior

Personal information
- Listed height: 6 ft 1 in (1.85 m)
- Listed weight: 208 lb (94 kg)

Career information
- High school: East Forsyth (Kernersville, North Carolina)
- College: Arkansas State (2023–2025); Iowa State (2026–present)

Awards and highlights
- Sun Belt Freshman of the Year (2023)
- Stats at ESPN

Jaylen Raynor is an American college football quarterback for the Iowa State Cyclones. He previously played for the Arkansas State Red Wolves. Raynor’s grandfather, John Raynor, is an athletic director and former varsity men’s basketball coach for San Ramon Valley High School.

== Early life ==
Raynor attended East Forsyth High School in Kernersville, North Carolina. In week one of his senior season in 2022, Raynor completed 12 of 26 passing attempts for 170 yards and three touchdowns and rushed for 343 yards and three touchdowns in a win over Northwest Guilford High School. He was an unranked quarterback recruit and committed to play college football at Arkansas State over offers from Army, Air Force, Navy, UMass and Miami (Ohio).

== College career ==
As a freshman in 2023, Raynor was named the 247Sports True Freshman of the Week after his week 5 performance against UMass, where he completed 20 of 35 passing attempts for 383 yards and a program record six touchdowns along with 35 rushing yards in his first road start. He was also named the Sun Belt Conference Offensive Player of the Week along with being named to the Davey O'Brien Great 8 and a Manning Award Star of the Week.

In 2024, Raynor returned as the Red Wolves starting quarterback.

On December 23, 2025, Raynor entered the transfer portal. On January 3, 2026, Raynor committed to the Iowa State Cyclones.

=== Statistics ===
Season	Team	Games			Passing								Rushing			
Season	Team	GP	GS	Record	Cmp	Att	Pct	Yds	Y/A	TD	Int	Rtg	Att	Yds	Avg	TD
2023	Arkansas State	11	10	5–5	166	285	58.2	2,550	8.9	17	7	148.2	123	373	3.0	5
2024	Arkansas State	13	13	8–5	259	420	61.7	2,783	6.6	16	10	125.1	137	387	2.8	3
2025	Arkansas State	13	13	7–6	333	501	66.5	3,361	6.7	19	11	130.9	154	423	2.7	7
2026	Iowa State	6	6	3–3	85	148	57.4	1,001	6.8	7	4	124.7	51	166	3.3	3
Career		43	42	23–19	843	1,354	62.3	9,695	7.2	59	32	132.1	465	1,349	2.9	18
