= Avante Dickerson =

American football player (born 2003)

No. 9 – Arkansas State Red Wolves
- Position: Cornerback
- Class: Redshirt Senior

Personal information
- Born: March 9, 2003 (age 23)
- Listed height: 5 ft 11 in (1.80 m)
- Listed weight: 181 lb (82 kg)

Career information
- High school: Westside (Omaha, Nebraska)
- College: Oregon (2021–2022); Utah State (2023–2024); Arkansas State (2025)
- Stats at ESPN

Avante Dickerson (born March 9, 2003) is an American college football cornerback for the Arkansas State Red Wolves. He previously played for the Oregon Ducks and the Utah State Aggies.

== Early life ==
Dickerson grew up in Omaha, Nebraska, attended Westside High School, and was a four‑star recruit by ESPN and 247Sports, ranking among the top cornerbacks nationally and the No. 2 player in Nebraska in his class. A multi‑sport athlete, he was also a standout in track (100 m, 200 m). As a senior, he earned MaxPreps First-Team All‑American and Nebraska State Player of the Year honors, tallying 19 tackles, four interceptions, nine pass breakups, and over 15 total touchdowns (offense, defense, and special teams). He would originally commit to play college football at Minnesota but would instead commit to Oregon.

== College career ==
=== Oregon ===
As a true freshman in 2021, Dickerson logged in five solo tackles on defense across 56 snaps. He redshirted in 2022 after appearing in one game with minimal defensive action.

On April 26, 2023, Dickerson announced that he would enter the NCAA transfer portal.

=== Utah State ===
On August 3, 2023, Dickerson announced that he would transfer to Utah State.

He appeared in 11 games (seven starts) in his first season with the Aggies. He recorded 17 total tackles (10 solo) and six pass breakups. In 2024, Dickerson played in nine games (seven starts), finishing with 19 tackles (11 solo), including 2.0 TFLs. He also notched his first career interception and three pass breakups. Notably, he posted a career‑high five tackles against Boise State and made his first interception against New Mexico. He broke up passes against opponents including USC, Utah, and Temple.

On December 5, 2024, Dickerson announced that he would enter the transfer portal for the second time.

=== Arkansas State ===
On February 5, 2025, Dickerson announced that he would transfer to Arkansas State.
