= Kyle Konrardy =

American football player (born 2004)

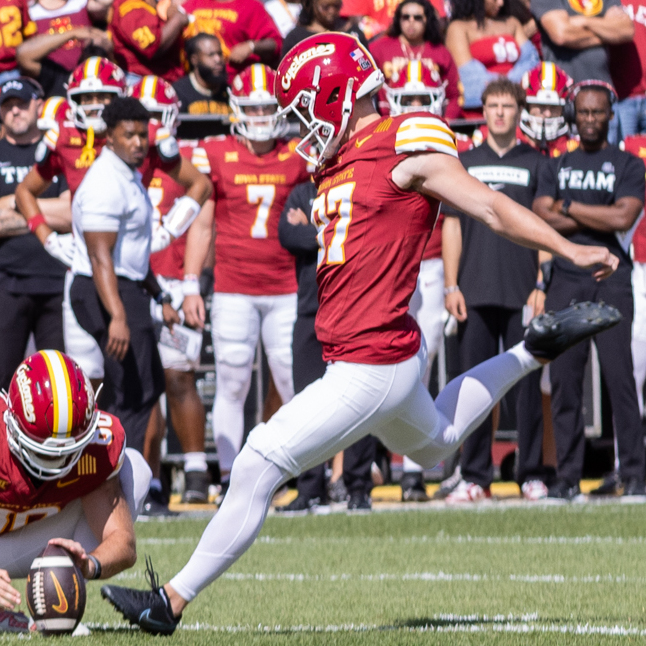
- Konrardy with Iowa State in 2025

No. 97 – Iowa State Cyclones
- Position: Kicker
- Class: Redshirt Junior

Personal information
- Born: October 7, 2004 (age 22)
- Listed height: 6 ft 1 in (1.85 m)
- Listed weight: 205 lb (93 kg)

Career information
- High school: Dubuque Senior (Dubuque, Iowa)
- College: Iowa State (2023–present)
- Stats at ESPN

Kyle Konrardy (born October 7, 2004) is an American college football kicker for the Iowa State Cyclones.

== Early life ==
Konrardy attended Dubuque Senior High School located in Dubuque, Iowa. In his first ever season of football during his junior year, he connected on 12 of his 15 field goals, and 27 of his 29 extra points. During his senior season, Konrardy made eight of his ten field goal attempts, and 22 of his 23 extra points, with a long of 52 yards. Ultimately, he decided to walk-on to play college football for the Iowa State Cyclones.

== College career ==
In his first collegiate season in 2023, he used the season to preserve his eligibility and redshirt. Heading into the 2024 season, Konrardy was named the Cyclones' starting kicker. In week two of the 2024 season, Konrardy made a game-winning 54-yard field goal, in a victory over rival Iowa. During the 2024 season, he converted 21 of his 28 field goals while making 46 of his 48 extra point attempts. Heading into the 2025 season, Konrardy was named to the 2025 Lou Groza Award watch list. In the first home game of the 2025 season, he kicked a 63-yard field goal, breaking the record for Jack Trice Stadium. The following week, he hit a game-winning field goal in the Cy-Hawk Game. However, in the first half of the fourth game of the season, Konrardy injured his groin and missed the several following games.

=== Statistics ===
General			Field goals					PATs			Kickoffs			Points
Season	Team	GP	FGM	FGA	FG%	Blck	Long	XPM	XPA	XP%	KO	Avg	TBs	Pts
2023	Iowa State	Redshirt												
2024	Iowa State	14	21	28	75.0%	0	54	46	48	95.8%	–	–	–	109
2025	Iowa State	9	14	18	77.8%	0	63	19	21	90.5%	10	64	6	61
2026	Iowa State	8	12	14	85.7%	0	51	28	28	100.00%	-	-	-	64
Career		31	47	60	78.3%	0	63	93	97	95.8%	10	64	6	234
