= 2026 Big 12 Conference football season =

American college football season

- League: NCAA Division I FBS football season
- Sport: football
- Duration: August 29, 2026; January 2027
- Teams: 16
- TV partner(s): ESPN (ABC, ESPN, ESPN2, ESPN+, ESPNU, Big 12 Now); Fox Sports (Fox, FS1, FS2); TNT Sports (TNT, HBO Max)

2027 NFL draft

Regular season

Championship Game
- Date: December 4, 2026
- Venue: AT&T Stadium, Arlington, Texas

Seasons
- 2025 2027

2026 Big 12 Conference football standings
	Conf.			Overall
Team	W		L	W		L
No. 2 Utah y	8	–	0	11	–	0
No. 12 Texas Tech	7	–	1	10	–	1
No. 10 BYU	6	–	2	9	–	2
No. 19 Arizona	5	–	3	8	–	3
No. 20 Houston	5	–	3	8	–	3
Oklahoma State	5	–	3	7	–	4
Baylor	4	–	4	6	–	5
Arizona State	4	–	4	6	–	5
UCF	4	–	4	6	–	5
Iowa State	3	–	5	5	–	6
TCU	3	–	5	5	–	6
Cincinnati	3	–	5	6	–	5
Kansas	2	–	6	4	–	7
West Virginia	2	–	6	5	–	6
Colorado	2	–	6	4	–	7
Kansas State	1	–	7	4	–	7
Championship: TBD vs. Utah
^ – College Football Playoff participant; $ – Conference champion; y – Championship game participant; As of November 22, 2026; Rankings from CFP rankings

The 2026 Big 12 Conference football season is the 31st season of the Big 12 Conference football taking place during the 2026 NCAA Division I FBS football season.

The 2026 Big 12 Championship Game will be played at AT&T Stadium in Arlington, Texas on December 4, 2026. The two top teams will play for the conference's automatic berth into the 2026–27 College Football Playoff.

== Preseason ==
=== Recruiting classes ===
National rankings
Team	ESPN	24/7	On3 recruits	Total signees
Arizona	39	42	46	20
Arizona State	41	40	34	21
Baylor	60	66	60	15
BYU	20	21	24	21
Cincinnati	56	57	61	25
Colorado	61	67	68	18
Houston	35	37	36	18
Iowa State	67	54	56	27
Kansas	52	60	62	18
Kansas State	50	50	45	24
Oklahoma State	71	70	70	20
TCU	49	46	43	21
Texas Tech	13	18	19	22
UCF	59	65	64	16
Utah	40	27	35	20
West Virginia	23	25	20	49

=== Big 12 media days ===
The 2026 Big 12 media days was held on July 7–8, 2026 at the Ford Center at The Star in Frisco, Texas.

- Big 12 Commissioner – Brett Yormark

School	Date	Head Coach	Players						
Arizona	July 8	Brent Brennan	Tristan Bounds	Taye Brown	Jay'vion Cole	Noah Fifita	Chris Hunter III	Tre Smith	
Arizona State	July 7	Kenny Dillingham	Khamari Anderson	Kyson Brown	Zyrus Fiaseu	C.J. Fite	Jalen Klemm	Lyrik Rawls	Montana Warren
Baylor	July 7	Dave Aranda	Michael Allen	Kyler Jordan	Matthew Klopsenstein	DJ Lagway	Kyland Reed	Jamaal Whyce Jr.	
BYU	July 7	Kalani Sitake	Bear Bachmeier	Isaiah Glasker	Evan Johnson	LJ Martin	Bruce Mitchell	Keanu Tanuvasa	
Cincinnati	July 8	Scott Satterfield	JC French	Antwan Peek Jr.	Evan Tengesdahl	Taran Tyo			
Colorado	July 7	Deion Sanders	Zach Atkins	Ben Finneseth	Julian Lewis	Naeten Mitchell	Danny Scudero	Cree Thomas	
Houston	July 7	Willie Fritz	McKenzie Agnello	Jordan Allen	Khalil Laufau	Amare Thomas	Kentrell Webb	Conner Weigman	
Iowa State	July 8	Jimmy Rogers	David Coffey	Aiden Flora	Kyle Konrardy	Jaylen Raynor	Isaac Terrell		
Kansas	July 8	Lance Leipold	Calvin Clements	Leroy Harris III	Blake Herold	Trey Lathan	Cameron Pickett		
Kansas State	July 8	Collin Klein	Wesley Fair	Joe Jackson	Avery Johnson	Rex Van Wyhe			
Oklahoma State	July 7	Eric Morris	Caleb Hawkins	Jaleel Johnson	Drew Mestemaker	Ethan Wesloski			
TCU	July 8	Sonny Dykes	Jaden Craig	Markis Deal	Ansel Din-Mbuh	Jamel Johnson	Paul Oyewale	Ben Taylor-Whitfield	
Texas Tech	July 7	Joey McGuire	Terrance Carter Jr.	Coy Eakin	A.J. Holmes Jr.	Brice Pollock	Ben Roberts	Sheridan Wilson	
UCF	July 7	Scott Frost	Alonza Barnett III	Jayden Bellamy	Lewis Carter	Preston Cushman			
Utah	July 8	Morgan Scalley	Devon Dampier	Johnathan Hall	Lance Holtzclaw	Wayshawn Parker			
West Virginia	July 8	Rich Rodriguez	Jaden Bray	Nick Krahe	Geimere Latimer II				

=== Preseason awards ===
==== All−American Teams ====
Player	AP	AS	WCFF	ESPN	CBS	SN	SI	USAT
Terrance Carter Jr.	2nd Team	3rd Team		1st Team	2nd Team	2nd Team	2nd Team	
Cam Cook	2nd Team		2nd Team			2nd Team		
Caleb Hawkins		2nd Team	2nd Team					
A. J. Holmes Jr.		2nd Team		2nd Team	2nd Team			2nd Team
Shadre Hurst	1st Team	3rd Team				2nd Team		
Bruce Mitchell		3rd Team						
LJ Martin	2nd Team	3rd Team					1st Team	2nd Team
Brice Pollock		2nd Team		1st Team				
Ben Roberts		3rd Team					1st Team	
Austin Romaine		4th Team						
Danny Scudero							2nd Team	
Faletau Satuala		4th Team						
Evan Tengesdahl	1st Team	2nd Team	2nd Team	2nd Team	2nd Team	2nd Team	2nd Team	1st Team
Amare Thomas		3rd Team						
Cade Uluave		4th Team						
J'Koby Williams				2nd Team	2nd Team			2nd Team
Palmer Williams	2nd Team	2nd Team	1st Team	2nd Team	2nd Team			2nd Team
Wyatt Young		3rd Team						

==== Individual awards ====
Award	Head Coach/Player	School	Position	Year
Lott Trophy	Tre Smith	Arizona	DL	Sr.
Lott Trophy	Cade Uluave	BYU	LB	Sr.
Lott Trophy	Jamel Johnson	TCU	S	Sr.
Lott Trophy	A. J. Holmes Jr.	Texas Tech	DL	Sr.
Lott Trophy	Ben Roberts	Texas Tech	LB	Sr.
Dodd Trophy	Willie Fritz	Houston	HC	–
Dodd Trophy	Sonny Dykes	TCU	HC	–
Maxwell Award	Noah Fifita	Arizona	QB	Sr.
Maxwell Award	DJ Lagway	Baylor	QB	Jr.
Maxwell Award	Bear Bachmeier	BYU	QB	So.
Maxwell Award	LJ Martin	BYU	RB	Sr.
Maxwell Award	Julian Lewis	Colorado	QB	RS-Fr.
Maxwell Award	Conner Weigman	Houston	QB	Sr.
Maxwell Award	Avery Johnson	Kansas State	QB	Sr.
Maxwell Award	Joe Jackson	Kansas State	RB	Sr.
Maxwell Award	Caleb Hawkins	Oklahoma State	RB	So.
Maxwell Award	Drew Mestemaker	Oklahoma State	QB	Jr.
Maxwell Award	Cameron Dickey	Texas Tech	RB	Jr.
Maxwell Award	Alonza Barnett III	UCF	QB	Sr.
Maxwell Award	Devon Dampier	Utah	QB	Sr.
Maxwell Award	Wayshawn Parker	Utah	RB	Jr.
Maxwell Award	Cam Cook	West Virginia	RB	Sr.
Outland Trophy	Tristan Bounds	Arizona	OT	Gr.
Outland Trophy	C. J. Fite	Arizona State	DT	Sr.
Outland Trophy	Bruce Mitchell	BYU	C	RS-Sr.
Outland Trophy	Keanu Tanuvasa	BYU	DT	RS-Sr.
Outland Trophy	Joe Cotton	Cincinnati	OT	Gr.
Outland Trophy	Evan Tengesdahl	Cincinnati	G	Sr.
Outland Trophy	Shadre Hurst	Houston	G	Gr.
Outland Trophy	Khalil Laufau	Houston	DT	Sr.
Outland Trophy	John Pastore	Kansas State	OT	Sr.
Outland Trophy	Ansel Din-Mbuh	TCU	DT	Sr.
Outland Trophy	Ben Taylor-Whitfield	TCU	OT	Sr.
Outland Trophy	A. J. Holmes Jr.	Texas Tech	DT	Sr.
Outland Trophy	Howard Sampson	Texas Tech	OT	Sr.
Outland Trophy	Sheridan Wilson	Texas Tech	C	Sr.
Bronko Nagurski Trophy	Taye Brown	Arizona	LB	Sr.
Bronko Nagurski Trophy	C. J. Fite	Arizona State	DT	Sr.
Bronko Nagurski Trophy	Isaiah Glasker	BYU	LB	RS-Sr.
Bronko Nagurski Trophy	Faletau Satuala	BYU	S	Jr.
Bronko Nagurski Trophy	Cade Uluave	BYU	LB	Sr.
Bronko Nagurski Trophy	Will James	Houston	DB	Sr.
Bronko Nagurski Trophy	Jamel Johnson	TCU	S	Sr.
Bronko Nagurski Trophy	A. J. Holmes Jr.	Texas Tech	DT	Sr.
Bronko Nagurski Trophy	Brice Pollock	Texas Tech	DB	Sr.
Bronko Nagurski Trophy	Ben Roberts	Texas Tech	LB	Sr.
John Mackey Award	Walker Lyons	BYU	TE	Jr.
John Mackey Award	Patrick Overmyer	Houston	TE	Sr.
John Mackey Award	Carter Moses	Kansas	TE	RS-Sr.
John Mackey Award	Garrett Oakley	Kansas State	TE	Sr.
John Mackey Award	Terrance Carter Jr.	Texas Tech	TE	Sr.
Rimington Trophy	Bruce Mitchell	BYU	C	RS-Sr.
Rimington Trophy	Anthony Boswell	Houston	C	Jr.
Rimington Trophy	Sheridan Wilson	Texas Tech	C	Sr.
Rimington Trophy	Landen Livingston	West Virginia	C	RS-Sr.
Lou Groza Award	Stone Harrington	Texas Tech	P	Sr.
Paul Hornung Award	Cameron Pettaway	Iowa State	RB	RS-So.
Paul Hornung Award	Miles Coleman	Oklahoma State	WR	Jr.
Paul Hornung Award	Kenny Johnson	Texas Tech	WR	Sr.
Paul Hornung Award	J'Koby Williams	Texas Tech	RB	Jr.
Paul Hornung Award	Jackson Bennee	Utah	S	Jr.
Paul Hornung Award	DJ Epps	West Virginia	WR	RS-Sr.
Wuerffel Trophy	Noah Fifita	Arizona	QB	Sr.
Wuerffel Trophy	Zyrus Fiaseu	Arizona State	LB	Gr.
Wuerffel Trophy	Michael Allen	Baylor	S	Gr.
Wuerffel Trophy	Evan Tengesdahl	Cincinnati	G	Sr.
Wuerffel Trophy	Ben Finneseth	Colorado	DB	Gr.
Wuerffel Trophy	McKenzie Agnello	Houston	OL	Gr.
Wuerffel Trophy	Jaylen Raynor	Iowa State	QB	Sr.
Wuerffel Trophy	Calvin Clements	Kansas	OL	RS-Jr.
Wuerffel Trophy	Joe Jackson	Kansas State	RB	Sr.
Wuerffel Trophy	Donovan Green	Oklahoma State	TE	RS-Sr.
Wuerffel Trophy	Ansel Din-Mbuh	TCU	DT	Sr.
Wuerffel Trophy	Ben Roberts	Texas Tech	LB	Sr.
Wuerffel Trophy	Lance Holtzclaw	Utah	DE	Gr.

Award	Head Coach/Player	School	Position	Year
Jim Thorpe Award	Faletau Satuala	BYU	S	Jr.
Jim Thorpe Award	Jamel Johnson	TCU	S	Sr.
Jim Thorpe Award	Brice Pollock	Texas Tech	DB	Sr.
Butkus Award	Taye Brown	Arizona	LB	Sr.
Butkus Award	Owen Long	Arizona State	LB	Jr.
Butkus Award	Cade Uluave	BYU	LB	Sr.
Butkus Award	Jonathan Thompson	Cincinnati	LB	Gr.
Butkus Award	Gideon Lampron	Colorado	LB	Gr.
Butkus Award	Liona Lefau	Colorado	LB	Sr.
Butkus Award	Trey Lathan	Kansas	LB	RS-Sr.
Butkus Award	Ethan Wesloski	Oklahoma State	LB	RS-Sr.
Butkus Award	John Curry	Texas Tech	LB	Sr.
Butkus Award	Ben Roberts	Texas Tech	LB	Gr.
Butkus Award	Austin Romaine	Texas Tech	LB	Sr.
Butkus Award	Jeremy Culbreath	UCF	LB	RS-Sr.
Ray Guy Award	Palmer Williams	Baylor	P	Sr.
Ray Guy Award	John Hoyet Chance	TCU	P	RS-So.
Ray Guy Award	Bryan Hansen	West Virginia	P	RS-Sr.
Walter Camp Award	Noah Fifita	Arizona	QB	Sr.
Walter Camp Award	LJ Martin	BYU	RB	Sr.
Walter Camp Award	Caleb Hawkins	Oklahoma State	RB	So.
Walter Camp Award	Cameron Dickey	Texas Tech	RB	Jr.
Walter Camp Award	Devon Dampier	Utah	QB	Sr.
Walter Camp Award	Cam Cook	West Virginia	RB	Sr.
Doak Walker Award	Kedrick Reescano	Arizona	RB	Sr.
Doak Walker Award	Richard Young	Colorado	RB	Sr.
Doak Walker Award	Makhi Hughes	Houston	RB	Sr.
Doak Walker Award	Caleb Hawkins	Oklahoma State	RB	So.
Doak Walker Award	Cameron Dickey	Texas Tech	RB	Jr.
Doak Walker Award	Duke Watson	UCF	RB	Jr.
Doak Walker Award	Cam Cook	West Virginia	RB	Sr.
Biletnikoff Award	Omarion Miller	Arizona State	WR	Sr.
Biletnikoff Award	Kam Perry	Colorado	WR	Gr.
Biletnikoff Award	Danny Scudero	Colorado	WR	Sr.
Biletnikoff Award	Amare Thomas	Houston	WR	Sr.
Biletnikoff Award	Trent Walker	Houston	WR	Gr.
Biletnikoff Award	Nik McMillan	Kansas	WR	RS-Sr.
Biletnikoff Award	Wyatt Young	Oklahoma State	WR	Jr.
Biletnikoff Award	Terrance Carter Jr.	Texas Tech	TE	Sr.
Biletnikoff Award	Jordan Dwyer	TCU	WR	Gr.
Biletnikoff Award	Braden Pegan	Utah	WR	Sr.
Davey O'Brien Award	Noah Fifita	Arizona	QB	Sr.
Davey O'Brien Award	Bear Bachmeier	BYU	QB	So.
Davey O'Brien Award	Conner Weigman	Houston	QB	Sr.
Davey O'Brien Award	Drew Mestemaker	Oklahoma State	QB	Jr.
Davey O'Brien Award	Alonza Barnett III	UCF	QB	Sr.
Davey O'Brien Award	Devon Dampier	Utah	QB	Sr.
Bednarik Award	Taye Brown	Arizona	LB	Sr.
Bednarik Award	Travion Barnes	Baylor	LB	Sr.
Bednarik Award	Isaiah Glasker	BYU	LB	Sr.
Bednarik Award	Cade Uluave	BYU	LB	Sr.
Bednarik Award	Faletau Satuala	BYU	S	Jr.
Bednarik Award	Johnathan Thompson	Cincinnati	LB	Sr.
Bednarik Award	Gideon Lampron	Colorado	LB	Sr.
Bednarik Award	Will James	Houston	CB	Jr.
Bednarik Award	Isaac Terrell	Iowa State	DE	Sr.
Bednarik Award	Trey Lathan	Kansas	S	Sr.
Bednarik Award	Wendell Gregory	Kansas State	DE	So.
Bednarik Award	Jemel Johnson	TCU	S	Sr.
Bednarik Award	A. J. Holmes Jr.	Texas Tech	DT	Sr.
Bednarik Award	Brice Pollock	Texas Tech	CB	Sr.
Bednarik Award	Ben Roberts	Texas Tech	LB	Sr.
Bednarik Award	Lewis Carter	UCF	LB	Sr.
Bednarik Award	Johnathan Hall	Utah	LB	Sr.

Award	Head Coach/Player	School	Position	Year
Manning Award	Noah Fifita	Arizona	QB	Sr.
Manning Award	Bear Bachmeier	BYU	QB	So.
Manning Award	JC French	Cincinnati	QB	Sr.
Manning Award	Connor Weigman	Houston	QB	Sr.
Manning Award	Jaylen Raynor	Iowa State	QB	Sr.
Manning Award	Drew Mestemaker	Oklahoma State	QB	So.
Manning Award	Alonza Barnett III	UCF	QB	Sr.
Manning Award	Devon Dampier	Utah	QB	Sr.
Rotary Lombardi Award	Cade Uluave	BYU	LB	Sr.
Rotary Lombardi Award	Evan Tengesdahl	Cincinnati	G	Sr.
Rotary Lombardi Award	Shadre Hurst	Houston	G	Gr.
Rotary Lombardi Award	Terrance Carter Jr.	Texas Tech	TE	Sr.
Rotary Lombardi Award	A. J. Holmes Jr.	Texas Tech	DL	Sr.
Rotary Lombardi Award	Ben Roberts	Texas Tech	LB	Sr.
Comeback Player of the Year Award	Malcolm Hartzog	Arizona	S	Gr.
Comeback Player of the Year Award	Tre Smith	Arizona	DE	Gr.
Comeback Player of the Year Award	DeKalon Taylor	Colorado	RB	Gr.
Comeback Player of the Year Award	Jayden Cofield	Texas Tech	DL	Sr.
Comeback Player of the Year Award	Will Hammond	Texas Tech	QB	Jr.
Comeback Player of the Year Award	Quinten Joyner	Texas Tech	RB	Sr.
Comeback Player of the Year Award	Hunter Andrews	Utah	TE/RB	Jr.
Comeback Player of the Year Award	Jaden Bray	West Virginia	WR	RS-Sr.
Polynesian College Football Player Of The Year Award	Noah Fifita	Arizona	QB	Sr.
Polynesian College Football Player Of The Year Award	Mays Pese	Arizona	DL	So.
Polynesian College Football Player Of The Year Award	Rhino Tapa'atoutai	Arizona	OL	Sr.
Polynesian College Football Player Of The Year Award	Tana Alo-Tupuola	Arizona State	OL	Jr.
Polynesian College Football Player Of The Year Award	Tausili Akana	BYU	DE	RS-Jr.
Polynesian College Football Player Of The Year Award	Raider Damuni	BYU	S	Sr.
Polynesian College Football Player Of The Year Award	Paki Finau	BYU	OL	RS-So.
Polynesian College Football Player Of The Year Award	Jaron Pula	BYU	WR	Fr.
Polynesian College Football Player Of The Year Award	Faletau Satuala	BYU	S	Jr.
Polynesian College Football Player Of The Year Award	Keanu Tanuvasa	BYU	DT	RS-Sr.
Polynesian College Football Player Of The Year Award	Cade Uluave	BYU	LB	Sr.
Polynesian College Football Player Of The Year Award	Liona Lefau	Colorado	LB	Sr.
Polynesian College Football Player Of The Year Award	Vili Taufatofua	Colorado	DL	Gr.
Polynesian College Football Player Of The Year Award	Sione Fotu	Houston	LB	Sr.
Polynesian College Football Player Of The Year Award	Khalil Laufau	Houston	DL	Sr.
Polynesian College Football Player Of The Year Award	Karson Kaufusi	Utah	DT	So.
Johnny Unitas Golden Arm Award	Noah Fifita	Arizona	QB	Sr.
Johnny Unitas Golden Arm Award	DJ Lagway	Baylor	QB	Jr.
Johnny Unitas Golden Arm Award	Conner Weigman	Houston	QB	Sr.
Johnny Unitas Golden Arm Award	Avery Johnson	Kansas State	QB	Sr.
Johnny Unitas Golden Arm Award	Drew Mestemaker	Oklahoma State	QB	Jr.
Johnny Unitas Golden Arm Award	Devon Dampier	Utah	QB	Sr.
Earl Campbell Tyler Rose Award	Kedrick Reescano	Arizona	RB	Sr.
Earl Campbell Tyler Rose Award	LJ Martin	BYU	RB	Sr.
Earl Campbell Tyler Rose Award	Quentin Gibson	Colorado	WR	So.
Earl Campbell Tyler Rose Award	Joseph Williams	Colorado	WR	Jr.
Earl Campbell Tyler Rose Award	Shadre Hurst	Houston	G	Gr.
Earl Campbell Tyler Rose Award	Patrick Overmyer	Houston	TE	Sr.
Earl Campbell Tyler Rose Award	Amare Thomas	Houston	WR	Sr.
Earl Campbell Tyler Rose Award	Conner Weigman	Houston	QB	Sr.
Earl Campbell Tyler Rose Award	Cody Jackson	Iowa State	WR	RS-Sr.
Earl Campbell Tyler Rose Award	Jeremy Payne	TCU	RB	Jr.
Earl Campbell Tyler Rose Award	Terrance Carter Jr.	Texas Tech	TE	Sr.
Earl Campbell Tyler Rose Award	Cameron Dickey	Texas Tech	RB	Jr.
Earl Campbell Tyler Rose Award	Will Hammond	Texas Tech	QB	Jr.
Earl Campbell Tyler Rose Award	J'Koby Williams	Texas Tech	RB	Jr.
Earl Campbell Tyler Rose Award	Sheridan Wilson	Texas Tech	C	Sr.
Earl Campbell Tyler Rose Award	Landen Chambers	UCF	RB	RS-Jr.
Shaun Alexander Freshman Player of the Year Award	Julian Lewis	Colorado	QB	RS-Fr.
Shaun Alexander Freshman Player of the Year Award	Keisean Henderson	Houston	QB	Fr.
Shaun Alexander Freshman Player of the Year Award	Felix Ojo	Texas Tech	OL	Fr.
Shaun Alexander Freshman Player of the Year Award	Kelvin Obot	Utah	OL	Fr.

==== Preseason All-Big 12 teams ====
2026 Preseason All-Big 12

- Offensive Player of the Year: LJ Martin, RB, BYU, Sr.
- Defensive Player of the Year: A.J. Holmes Jr., DL, Texas Tech, Sr.
- Newcomer of the Year: Drew Mestemaker, QB, Oklahoma State, RS-So.

All-Big 12 Offense
Position	Player	Class	Team
QB	Noah Fifita	R-Sr.	Arizona
RB	Cam Cook	Sr.	West Virginia
RB	L.J. Martin	Sr.	BYU
RB	Kayden Luke	Jr.	West Virginia
WR	Omarion Miller	Sr.	Arizona State
WR	Amare Thomas	Sr.	Houston
WR	Wyatt Young	Jr.	Oklahoma State
TE/FLEX	Terrance Carter Jr.	Sr.	Texas Tech
OL	Joe Cotton	R-Sr.	Cincinnati
OL	Shadre Hurst	Sr.	Houston
OL	Bruce Mitchell	R-Sr.	BYU
OL	John Pastore	Sr.	Kansas State
OL	Evan Tengesdahl	R-Jr.	Cincinnati
PK	Stone Harrington	Sr.	Texas Tech
KR/PR	Mana Carvalho	So.	Utah

All-Big 12 Defense
Position	Player	Class	Team
DL	C.J. Fite	Sr.	Arizona State
DL	Wendell Gregory	So.	Kansas State
DL	A.J. Holmes Jr.	Sr.	Texas Tech
DL	Keanu Tanuvasa	R-Sr.	BYU
DL	Adam Trick	Sr.	Texas Tech
LB	Ben Carter	Sr.	Texas Tech
LB	Austin Romaine	Sr.	Texas Tech
LB	Cade Uluave	Sr.	BYU
DB	Will James	Jr.	Houston
DB	Evan Johnson	R-Sr.	BYU
DB	Jamel Johnson	Sr.	TCU
DB	Brice Pollock	Sr.	Texas Tech
DB	Faletau Satuala	Jr.	BYU
P	Palmer Williams	Sr.	Baylor

== Head coaches ==
=== Coaching changes ===
There were four coaching changes before the 2026 season. On November 25, 2025, Eric Morris was hired out of North Texas as the 25th head coach at Oklahoma State to replace Mike Gundy who was fired. On December 4, 2025 Texas A&M offensive coordinator Collin Klein was named the 36th head coach at Kansas State to replace Chris Klieman who retired. On December 5, 2025, Jimmy Rogers was named the 34th head football coach at Iowa State following former coach Matt Campbell who accepted the head coaching position at Penn State. On December 13, 2025, Utah defensive coordinator Morgan Scalley was promoted to head coach following Kyle Whittingham stepping down and then later accepting the head coaching position at Michigan.

=== Coaches ===
Note: All stats current through the completion of the 2025 season

Team	Head coach	Year at school	Overall record	Record at school	Big 12 record	Conference Championships
Arizona	Brent Brennan	3	47–60	13–12	8–10	0
Arizona State	Kenny Dillingham	4	22–17	22–17	13–5	1
Baylor	Dave Aranda	7	36–37	36–37	24–30	1
BYU	Kalani Sitake	11	84–45	84–45	17–10	0
Cincinnati	Scott Satterfield	4	91–70	15–22	9–18	0
Colorado	Deion Sanders	4	43–27	16–21	8–10	0
Houston	Willie Fritz	3	222–127	14–11	9–9	0
Iowa State	Jimmy Rogers	1	33–9	0–0	0–0	0
Kansas	Lance Leipold	6	173–74	27–35	16–29	0
Kansas State	Collin Klein	1	0–0	0–0	0–0	1
Oklahoma State	Eric Morris	1	46–34	0–0	0–0	0
TCU	Sonny Dykes	5	107–80	36–17	23–13	0
Texas Tech	Joey McGuire	5	35–18	35–18	24–12	1
UCF	Scott Frost	4	40–45	24–14	2–7	0
Utah	Morgan Scalley	1	0–0	0–0	0–0	0
West Virginia	Rich Rodriguez	9	194–136–2	64–34	2–7	0

== Schedule ==
Index to colors and formatting
Big 12 member won
Big 12 member lost
Big 12 teams in **bold**

All times Central time.

† denotes Homecoming game

Rankings reflect those of the AP poll for weeks 0 through 9. Rankings from Week 10 until the end of the Season reflect those of the College Football Playoff Rankings.

=== Regular season ===
==== Week Zero ====
Date	Time	Visiting team	Home team	Site	TV	Result	Attendance	Ref.
August 29	11:00 a.m.	North Carolina	**TCU**	Aviva Stadium • Dublin, Ireland (Aer Lingus College Football Classic)	ESPN	**L** 10–15	40,457	
^{#}Rankings from AP Poll released prior to game. All times are in Central Time.

==== Week One ====
Date	Time	Visiting team	Home team	Site	TV	Result	Attendance	Ref.
September 3	6:00 p.m.	Bethune-Cookman	**UCF**	Acrisure Bounce House • Orlando, FL	ESPN+	**W** 73–0	43,127	
September 3	7:00 p.m.	**Colorado**	Georgia Tech	Bobby Dodd Stadium • Atlanta, GA	ESPN	**W** 14–13	52,113	
September 3	8:00 p.m.	Idaho	No. 21 **Utah**	Rice–Eccles Stadium • Salt Lake City, UT	ESPNU	**W** 66–14	51,444	
September 4	7:00 p.m.	LIU	**Kansas**	David Booth Kansas Memorial Stadium • Lawrence, KS	ESPNU	**W** 51–6	30,904	
September 5	11:00 a.m.	Oregon State	No. 23 **Houston**	TDECU Stadium • Houston, TX	ESPN	**W** 33–20	28,742	
September 5	11:00 a.m.	Coastal Carolina	**West Virginia**	Milan Puskar Stadium • Morgantown, WV	TNT/HBO Max	**W** 31–24	54,158	
September 5	12:00 p.m.	Southeast Missouri	**Iowa State**	Jack Trice Stadium • Ames, IA	ESPN+	**W** 38–10	51,802	
September 5	2:30 p.m.	**Baylor**	Auburn	Mercedes-Benz Stadium • Atlanta, GA (Aflac Kickoff Game)	ABC	**L** 16–17	55,068	
September 5	2:30 p.m.	Boston College	**Cincinnati**	Nippert Stadium • Cincinnati, OH	FOX	**W** 34–15	37,097	
September 5	2:45 p.m.	**Oklahoma State**	Tulsa	Skelly Field at H. A. Chapman Stadium • Tulsa, OK	ESPNU	**L** 10–24	28,520	
September 5	6:00 p.m.	Nicholls	**Kansas State**	Bill Snyder Family Football Stadium • Manhattan, KS	ESPN+	**W** 71–3	51,719	
September 5	6:00 p.m.	No. 20 (FCS) Abilene Christian	No. 12 **Texas Tech**	Galaxy Stadium • Lubbock, TX	FS1	**W** 33–10	60,229	
September 5	7:00 p.m.	Utah Tech	No. 14т **BYU**	LaVell Edwards Stadium • Provo, UT	ESPN+	**W** 63–7	64,077	
September 5	8:30 p.m.	No. 22 (FCS) Northern Arizona	**Arizona**	Casino Del Sol Stadium • Tucson, AZ	ESPN+	**W** 35–7	40,129	
September 5	9:00 p.m.	Morgan State	**Arizona State**	Mountain America Stadium • Tempe, AZ	ESPN+	**W** 70–7	54,004	
^{#}Rankings from AP Poll released prior to game. All times are in Central Time.

Date	Bye Week
September 5	**TCU**

==== Week Two ====
Date	Time	Visiting team	Home team	Site	TV	Result	Attendance	Ref.
September 11	7:00 p.m.	No. 23 Missouri	**Kansas**	David Booth Kansas Memorial Stadium • Lawrence, KS (Border War)	FOX	**L** 21–38	32,000	
September 12	11:00 a.m.	**Arizona State**	No. 10 Texas A&M	Kyle Field • College Station, TX	ABC	**L** 20–48	107,523	
September 12	11:00 a.m.	Washington State	**Kansas State**	Bill Snyder Family Football Stadium • Manhattan, KS	TNT/HBO Max	**W** 34–7	51,759	
September 12	11:00 a.m.	No. 6 Oregon	**Oklahoma State**	Boone Pickens Stadium • Stillwater, OK	ESPN	**W** 39–31	51,035	
September 12	12:00 p.m.	UT Martin	**West Virginia**	Milan Puskar Stadium • Morgantown, WV	ESPN+	**W** 52–7	47,049	
September 12	2:30 p.m.	**Arizona**	No. 15 **BYU**	LaVell Edwards Stadium • Provo, UT	FOX	**BYU** 28–17	64,409	
September 12	2:30 p.m.	Weber State	**Colorado**	Folsom Field • Boulder, CO	ESPN+	**W** 52–21	49,363	
September 12	2:30 p.m.	**UCF**	Pitt	Acrisure Stadium • Pittsburgh, PA	ESPN2	**L** 7–12	45,926	
September 12	6:00 p.m.	Western Carolina	**Cincinnati**	Nippert Stadium • Cincinnati, OH	ESPN+	**W** 62–10	34,827	
September 12	6:00 p.m.	Southern	No. 22 **Houston**	TDECU Stadium • Houston, TX	ESPN+	**W** 77–6	28,936	
September 12	6:30 p.m.	**Iowa State**	No. 21 Iowa	Kinnick Stadium • Iowa City, IA (Cy-Hawk Trophy)	NBC	**L** 13–16	69,250	
September 12	6:30 p.m.	No. 13 **Texas Tech**	Oregon State	Reser Stadium • Corvallis, OR	CBS	**W** 35–24	30,539	
September 12	7:00 p.m.	Prairie View A&M	**Baylor**	McLane Stadium • Waco, TX	ESPN+	**W** 44–3	38,642	
September 12	7:00 p.m.	Grambling State	**TCU**	Amon G. Carter Stadium • Fort Worth, TX	ESPN+	**W** 63–7	37,600	
September 12	9:15 p.m.	Arkansas	No. 20 **Utah**	Rice–Eccles Stadium • Salt Lake City, UT	ESPN	**W** 43–10	51,532	
^{#}Rankings from AP Poll released prior to game. All times are in Central Time.

==== Week Three ====
Date	Time	Visiting team	Home team	Site	TV	Result	Attendance	Ref.
September 18	7:00 p.m.	No. 22 **Houston**	No. 13 **Texas Tech**	Galaxy Stadium • Lubbock, TX (rivalry)	FOX	**TTU** 28–26	60,229	
September 19	11:00 a.m.	**Arizona State**	**Kansas**	Wembley Stadium • London, England (Union Jack Classic)	FS1	**ASU** 24–17	46,523	
September 19	11:00 a.m.	Bowling Green	**Iowa State**	Jack Trice Stadium • Ames, IA	ESPNU	**W** 55–7	50,395	
September 19	11:00 a.m.	Tulane	**Kansas State**	Bill Snyder Family Football Stadium • Manhattan, KS	ESPN2	**W** 31–20	51,846	
September 19	2:30 p.m.	Miami (OH)	**Cincinnati**	TQL Stadium • Cincinnati, OH (Victory Bell)	ESPN+	**W** 35–33	19,188	
September 19	2:30 p.m.	Utah State	No. 17 **Utah**	Rice–Eccles Stadium • Salt Lake City, UT (Battle of the Brothers)	FOX	**W** 33–0	51,455	
September 19	3:00 p.m.	Louisiana Tech	**Baylor**	McLane Stadium • Waco, TX	ESPNU	**W** 36–19	41,343	
September 19	6:00 p.m.	Murray State	**Oklahoma State**	Boone Pickens Stadium • Stillwater, OK	ESPN+	**W** 59–0	52,168	
September 19	6:00 p.m.	Georgia State	**UCF**	Acrisure Bounce House • Orlando, FL	ESPN+	**W** 44–30	44,620	
September 19	6:30 p.m.	**Colorado**	Northwestern	Ryan Field • Evanston, IL	FOX	**L** 7–41	12,023	
September 19	6:30 p.m.	**West Virginia**	No. 25 Virginia	Bank of America Stadium • Charlotte, NC	ACCN	**W** 38–27	39,377	
September 19	6:30 p.m.	No. 11 **BYU**	Colorado State	Canvas Stadium • Fort Collins, CO	CBS	**W** 41–23	38,759	
September 19	7:00 p.m.	Arkansas State	**TCU**	Amon G. Carter Stadium • Fort Worth, TX	ESPNU	**W** 31–7	46,139	
September 19	9:30 p.m.	Northern Illinois	**Arizona**	Casino Del Sol Stadium • Tucson, AZ	TNT/HBO Max	**W** 42–17	40,413	
^{#}Rankings from AP Poll released prior to game. All times are in Central Time.

==== Week Four ====
Date	Time	Visiting team	Home team	Site	TV	Result	Attendance	Ref.
September 26	11:00 a.m.	**Colorado**	**Baylor**	McLane Stadium • Waco, TX	ESPN2	**BAY** 23–13	40,015	
September 26	11:00 a.m.	Sam Houston	No. 11 **Texas Tech**	Galaxy Stadium • Lubbock, TX	TNT	**W** 49–14	59,704	
September 26	2:30/3:00 p.m.	No. 25 **Houston**	Georgia Southern	Paulson Stadium • Statesboro, GA	ESPNU	**W** 42–28	24,112	
September 26	2:30 p.m.	**TCU**	**UCF**	Acrisure Bounce House • Orlando, FL	FS1	**UCF** 13–21	43,212	
September 26	2:30 p.m.	No. 15 **Utah**	**Iowa State**	Jack Trice Stadium • Ames, IA	FOX	**UTAH** 31–17	52,150	
September 26	6:00 p.m.	**Kansas State**	**Cincinnati**	Nippert Stadium • Cincinnati, OH	ESPN2	**CIN** 31–26	37,562	
September 26	6:00 p.m.	**Oklahoma State**	**West Virginia**	Milan Puskar Stadium • Morgantown, WV	FS1	**OSU** 41–24	57,756	
September 26	6:30 p.m.	**Arizona**	Washington State	Martin Stadium • Pullman, WA	CBS	**W** 34–24	23,903	
^{#}Rankings from AP Poll released prior to game. All times are in Central Time.

Date	Bye Week		
September 26	**Arizona State**	**No. 9 BYU**	**Kansas**

==== Week Five ====
Date	Time	Visiting team	Home team	Site	TV	Result	Attendance	Ref.
October 3	11:00 a.m.	**UCF**	No. 20 **Houston**	TDECU Stadium • Houston, TX	ESPN2	**HOU** 27–17	25,593	
October 3	11:00 a.m.	**West Virginia**	**Iowa State**	Jack Trice Stadium • Ames, IA	TNT	**ISU** 45–42	52,724	
October 3	11:00 a.m.	Middle Tennessee	**Kansas**	David Booth Kansas Memorial Stadium • Lawrence, KS	ESPNU	**W** 55–0	32,000	
October 3	6:00 p.m.	No. 10 **BYU**	**TCU**	Amon G. Carter Stadium • Fort Worth, TX	ESPN	**BYU** 17–10	38,327	
October 3	6:30 p.m.	No. 12 **Texas Tech**	**Colorado**	Folsom Field • Boulder, CO	FOX	**TTU** 29–7	50,106	
October 3	9:30 p.m.	**Baylor**	**Arizona State**	Mountain America Stadium • Tempe, AZ	ESPN	**BAY** 55–19	54,063	
October 3	10:00 p.m.	**Cincinnati**	**Arizona**	Casino Del Sol Stadium • Tucson, AZ	FOX	**ARIZ** 34–7	43,760	
^{#}Rankings from AP Poll released prior to game. All times are in Central Time.

Date	Bye Week		
October 3	**Kansas State**	**No. 19 Oklahoma State**	**No. 13 Utah**

==== Week Six ====
Date	Time	Visiting team	Home team	Site	TV	Result	Attendance	Ref.
October 9	9:15 p.m.	**Iowa State**	No. 8 **BYU**	LaVell Edwards Stadium • Provo, UT	ESPN	**BYU** 24–10	64,632	
October 10	11:00 a.m.	**UCF**	No. 18 **Oklahoma State**	Boone Pickens Stadium • Stillwater, OK	ESPN2	**OSU** 42–28	52,168	
October 10	11:00 a.m.	**Arizona**	**West Virginia**	Milan Puskar Stadium • Morgantown, WV	TNT/TruTV	**ARIZ** 52–31	50,121	
October 10	2:30 p.m.	No. 22 **Houston**	**Kansas State**	Bill Snyder Family Football Stadium • Manhattan, KS	FOX	**HOU** 35–16	51,569	
October 10	7:00 p.m.	**Kansas**	No. 12 **Utah**	Rice–Eccles Stadium • Salt Lake City, UT	ESPNews	**UTAH** 41–24	51,467	
October 10	9:30 p.m.	Hawaii	**Arizona State**	Mountain America Stadium • Tempe, AZ	FS1	**W** 30–12	47,931	
^{#}Rankings from AP Poll released prior to game. All times are in Central Time.

Date	Bye Week				
October 10	**Baylor**	**Cincinnati**	**Colorado**	**TCU**	**No. 11 Texas Tech**

==== Week Seven ====
Date	Time	Visiting team	Home team	Site	TV	Result	Attendance	Ref.
October 17	11:00 a.m.	**Cincinnati**	**West Virginia**	Milan Puskar Stadium • Morgantown, WV (rivalry)	TNT/TruTV	**WVU** 45–42	48,106	
October 17	11:00 a.m.	**Kansas**	**Kansas State**	Bill Snyder Family Football Stadium • Manhattan, KS (Sunflower Showdown)	FS1	**KSU** 35–24	51,961	
October 17	2:30 p.m.	**Arizona State**	No. 10 **Texas Tech**	Galaxy Stadium • Lubbock, TX	FOX	**TTU** 53–25	60,229	
October 17	6:00 p.m.	**TCU**	**Baylor**	McLane Stadium • Waco, TX (Bluebonnet Battle)	FS1	**TCU** 17–6	46,634	
October 17	6:30 p.m.	No. 18 **Oklahoma State**	No. 20 **Houston**	TDECU Stadium • Houston, TX	FOX	**HOU** 35–32	42,544	
October 17	6:30 p.m.	No. 2 Notre Dame	No. 8 **BYU**	LaVell Edwards Stadium • Provo, UT (College GameDay)	ABC	**W** 28–24	65,179	
October 17	9:15 p.m.	No. 11 **Utah**	**Colorado**	Folsom Field • Boulder, CO (Rumble in the Rockies)	ESPN	**UTAH** 27–24	52,489	
^{#}Rankings from AP Poll released prior to game. All times are in Central Time.

Date	Bye Week		
October 17	**Arizona**	**Iowa State**	**UCF**

==== Week Eight ====
Date	Time	Visiting team	Home team	Site	TV	Result	Attendance	Ref.
October 24	11:00 a.m.	**West Virginia**	**TCU**	Amon G. Carter Stadium • Fort Worth, TX	ESPN2	**WVU** 24–20	36,216	
October 24	11:00 a.m.	No. 8 **Texas Tech**	**Cincinnati**	Nippert Stadium • Cincinnati, OH	FS1	**CIN** 37–24	38,088	
October 24	12:00 p.m.	**Baylor**	**Kansas**	David Booth Kansas Memorial Stadium • Lawrence, KS	TNT/TruTV	**KAN** 25–24	32,000	
October 24	2:30 p.m.	No. 2 **BYU**	**UCF**	Acrisure Bounce House • Orlando, FL	FOX	**UCF** 39–31 ^{2OT}	45,112	
October 24	2:45 p.m.	**Kansas State**	**Arizona State**	Mountain America Stadium • Tempe, AZ	ESPN2	**ASU** 28–17	46,388	
October 24	6:00 p.m.	**Colorado**	**Oklahoma State**	Boone Pickens Stadium • Stillwater, OK	FS1	**OSU** 57–24	52,168	
October 24	6:30 p.m.	**Iowa State**	No. 25 **Arizona**	Casino Del Sol Stadium • Tucson, AZ	ESPN2	**ARIZ** 39–3	45,477	
October 24	9:15 p.m.	No. 14 **Houston**	No. 10 **Utah**	Rice–Eccles Stadium • Salt Lake City, UT (College GameDay)	ESPN	**UTAH** 21–13	51,864	
^{#}Rankings from AP Poll released prior to game. All times are in Central Time.

==== Week Nine ====
Date	Time	Visiting team	Home team	Site	TV	Result	Attendance	Ref.
October 30	6:30 p.m.	**Baylor**	**UCF**	Acrisure Bounce House • Orlando, FL	ESPN	**BAY** 41–9	45,906	
October 31	11:00 a.m.	No. 22 **Arizona**	No. 13 **Texas Tech**	Galaxy Stadium • Lubbock, TX	ESPN	**TTU** 34–26	59,131	
October 31	1:00 p.m.	**Kansas State**	**Colorado**	Folsom Field • Boulder, CO (rivalry)	TNT/HBO Max	**COL** 27–24 ^{OT}	46,325	
October 31	2:30 p.m.	**Arizona State**	No. 8 **BYU**	LaVell Edwards Stadium • Provo, UT	FOX	**BYU** 27–20	63,332	
October 31	2:30 p.m.	**Kansas**	**TCU**	Amon G. Carter Stadium • Fort Worth, TX	FS1	**TCU** 22–16	32,549	
October 31	2:45 p.m.	No. 6 **Utah**	**Cincinnati**	Nippert Stadium • Cincinnati, OH	ESPN	**UTAH** 49–25	36,487	
October 31	6:00 p.m.	No. 24 **Oklahoma State**	**Iowa State**	Jack Trice Stadium • Ames, IA	FOX	**ISU** 51–49	50,295	
^{#}Rankings from AP Poll released prior to game. All times are in Central Time.

Date	Bye Week	
October 31	**No. 18 Houston**	**West Virginia**

==== Week Ten ====
Date	Time	Visiting team	Home team	Site	TV	Result	Attendance	Ref.
November 6	9:15 p.m.	**TCU**	No. 22 **Arizona**	Casino Del Sol Stadium • Tucson, AZ	ESPN	**ARIZ** 29–28	40,501	
November 7	11:00 a.m.	No. 3 **BYU**	No. 9 **Utah**	Rice–Eccles Stadium • Salt Lake City, UT (Holy War)	ABC	**UTAH** 28–20	52,901	
November 7	11:00 a.m.	**Iowa State**	**Baylor**	McLane Stadium • Waco, TX	FS1	**BAY** 42–31	39,229	
November 7	12:00 p.m.	**Oklahoma State**	**Kansas State**	Bill Snyder Family Football Stadium • Manhattan, KS	TNT/HBO Max	**OSU** 66–28	52,134	
November 7	2:30 p.m.	**Cincinnati**	No. 17 **Houston**	TDECU Stadium • Houston, TX	FOX	**HOU** 31–24	32,372	
November 7	2:45 p.m.	**UCF**	**Kansas**	David Booth Kansas Memorial Stadium • Lawrence, KS	ESPN2	**UCF** 33–32	31,008	
November 7	6:30 p.m.	**Colorado**	**Arizona State**	Mountain America Stadium • Tempe, AZ	ESPN2	**ASU** 20–10	54,166	
November 7	8:30 p.m.	**West Virginia**	No. 15 **Texas Tech**	Galaxy Stadium • Lubbock, TX	ESPN	**TTU** 53–48	60,229	
^{#}Rankings from College Football Playoff. All times are in Central Time.

==== Week Eleven ====
Date	Time	Visiting team	Home team	Site	TV	Result	Attendance	Ref.
November 13	9:15 p.m.	No. 14 **Houston**	**Colorado**	Folsom Field • Boulder, CO	ESPN	**COL** 42–32	47,495	
November 14	11:00 a.m.	**Cincinnati**	**Iowa State**	Jack Trice Stadium • Ames, IA	TNT/TruTV	**ISU** 41–13	50,162	
November 14	1:00 p.m.	**Kansas State**	**TCU**	Amon G. Carter Stadium • Fort Worth, TX	ESPNU	**TCU** 20–10	37,203	
November 14	2:30 p.m.	**Kansas**	**West Virginia**	Milan Puskar Stadium • Morgantown, WV	ESPN2	**KU** 37–14	45,629	
November 14	4:30 p.m.	**Arizona State**	**UCF**	Acrisure Bounce House • Orlando, FL	ESPNU	**ASU** 26–13	44,114	
November 14	6:00 p.m.	**Baylor**	No. 10 **BYU**	LaVell Edwards Stadium • Provo, UT	FOX	**BYU** 28–7	63,008	
November 14	8:30 p.m.	No. 12 **Texas Tech**	No. 25 **Oklahoma State**	Boone Pickens Stadium • Stillwater, OK	ESPN	**TTU** 52–27	52,168	
November 14	9:30 p.m.	No. 2 **Utah**	No. 23 **Arizona**	Casino Del Sol Stadium • Tucson, AZ (Big Noon Kickoff)	FOX	**UTAH** 40–39	48,858	
^{#}Rankings from College Football Playoff. All times are in Central Time.

==== Week Twelve ====
Date	Time	Visiting team	Home team	Site	TV	Result	Attendance	Ref.
November 20	5:00 p.m.	**Iowa State**	UCF	Acrisure Bounce House • Orlando, FL	FS1	**UCF** 48–17	34,043	
November 21	11:00 a.m.	**Colorado**	Cincinnati	Nippert Stadium • Cincinnati, OH	ESPN+	**CIN** 35–28	36,792	
November 21	11:00 a.m.	No. 10 **BYU**	Kansas	David Booth Kansas Memorial Stadium • Lawrence, KS	ABC	**BYU** 31–29 ^{3OT}	30,121	
November 21	12:00 p.m.	No. 20 **Houston**	West Virginia	Milan Puskar Stadium • Morgantown, WV	TNT/TruTV	**HOU** 33–31	37,380	
November 21	2:30 p.m.	No. 12 **Texas Tech**	Baylor	McLane Stadium • Waco, TX (rivalry)	FOX	**TTU** 20–10	46,765	
November 21	6:00 p.m.	No. 19 **Arizona**	Kansas State	Bill Snyder Family Football Stadium • Manhattan, KS	FS1	**ARIZ** 35–28 ^{OT}	49,807	
November 21	8:00 p.m.	No. 2 **Utah**	TCU	Amon G. Carter Stadium • Fort Worth, TX	FOX	**UTAH** 38–17	36,906	
November 21	9:15 p.m.	**Oklahoma State**	Arizona State	Mountain America Stadium • Tempe, AZ	ESPN	**OSU** 30–37 ^{OT}	51,154	
^{#}Rankings from College Football Playoff. All times are in Central Time.

==== Week Thirteen ====
Date	Time	Visiting team	Home team	Site	TV	Result	Attendance	Ref.
November 26	7:00 p.m.	TCU	Texas Tech	Galaxy Stadium • Lubbock, TX (rivalry)	ESPN	–		
November 27	8:00 p.m.	West Virginia	Utah	Rice–Eccles Stadium • Salt Lake City, UT	FOX	–		
November 28	1:00 p.m.	Kansas State	Iowa State	Jack Trice Stadium • Ames, IA (Farmageddon)	ESPN+	–		
November 28	1:00 p.m.	UCF	Colorado	Folsom Field • Boulder, CO	TNT/TruTV	–		
November 28	2:30 p.m.	Cincinnati	BYU	LaVell Edwards Stadium • Provo, UT	FOX	–		
November 28	5:15 p.m.	Kansas	Oklahoma State	Boone Pickens Stadium • Stillwater, OK	ESPN2	–		
November 28	8:00 p.m.	Arizona State	Arizona	Casino Del Sol Stadium • Tucson, AZ (Duel in the Desert)	FOX	–		
November 28	8:30 p.m.	Baylor	Houston	TDECU Stadium • Houston, TX (rivalry)	ESPN2	–		
^{#}Rankings from College Football Playoff. All times are in Central Time.

=== Championship Game ===
Date	Time	Visiting team	Home team	Site	TV	Result	Attendance	Ref.
December 4	7:00 p.m.	**TBD**	**Utah**	AT&T Stadium • Arlington, Texas	ABC	–		
^{#}Rankings from College Football Playoff. All times are in Central Time.

== Postseason ==
=== Bowl games ===
Legend
Big 12 win
Big 12 loss

Bowl game	Date	Site	Time (CST)	Television	Big 12 team	Opponent	Score	Attendance	Conference Bowl Record
	TBD • TBD	TBD	TBD			−		−	
**College Football Playoff bowl games**
	TBD	TBD • TBD	TBD	ESPN			−		−

Rankings are from CFP rankings. All times Central Time Zone. Big-12 teams shown in bold.

=== Selection of teams ===
- **Bowl eligible (10): Arizona, Arizona State, Baylor, BYU, Cincinnati, Houston, Oklahoma State, Texas Tech, UCF, Utah**
- **Bowl-ineligible (3): Colorado, Kansas, Kansas State**

== Head to head matchups ==
	**Arizona**	**Arizona**; **State**	**Baylor**	**BYU**	**Cincinnati**	**Colorado**	**Houston**	**Iowa**; **State**	**Kansas**	**Kansas**; **State**	**Oklahoma**; **State**	**TCU**	**Texas**; **Tech**	**UCF**	**Utah**	**West**; **Virginia**
vs. Arizona	—	0–0		1–0	0–1			0–1		0–1		0–1	1–0		1–0	0–1
vs. Arizona State	0–0	—	1–0	1–0		0–1			0–1	0–1	0–0		1–0	0–1		
vs. Baylor		0–1	—	1–0		0–1	0–0	0–1	1–0			1–0	0–0	0–1		
vs. BYU	0–1	0–1	0–1	—	0–0			0–1	0–1			0–1		0–1	1–0	
vs. Cincinnati	1–0			0–0	—	0–1	1–0	1–0		0–1			0–1		1–0	1–0
vs. Colorado		1–0	1–0		1–0	—	0–1			0–1	1–0		1–0	0–0	1–0	
vs. Houston			0–0		0–1	1–0	—			0–1	0–1		1–0	0–1	1–0	0–1
vs. Iowa State	1–0		1–0	1–0	0–1			—		0–0	0–1			1–0	1–0	0–1
vs. Kansas		1–0	0–1	1–0					—	1–0	0–0	1–0		1–0	1–0	0–1
vs. Kansas State	1–0	1–0			1–0	1–0	1–0	0–0	0–1	—	1–0	1–0	0–0			
vs. Oklahoma State		0–0				0–1	1–0	1–0	0–0	0–1	—		1–0	0–1		0–1
vs. TCU	1–0		0–1	1–0					0–1	0–1		—	0–0	1–0	1–0	1–0
vs. Texas Tech	0–1	0–1	0–0		1–0	0–1	0–1				0–1	0–0	—			0–1
vs. UCF		1–0	1–0	0–1		0–0	1–0	0–1	0–1		1–0	0–1		—		
vs. Utah	0–1			0–1	0–1	0–1	0–1	0–1	0–1			0–1			—	0–0
vs. West Virginia	1–0				0–1		1–0	1–0	2–0		1–0	0–1	1–0		0–0	—
Total	5–3	4–3	4–3	6–2	3–5	2–6	5–3	3–5	2–6	1–7	4–3	3–5	6–1	4–4	8–0	2–6

Updated thru Week 10.

== Big 12 vs. other conferences ==
=== Big 12 vs. Power 4 matchups ===
This is a list of the Power Four conferences teams (ACC, Big Ten, Notre Dame and SEC).

Date	Big 12 Team	Opponent	Conference	Location	Result
August 29	TCU†	**North Carolina**	ACC	Aviva Stadium • Dublin, Ireland	**L**10–15
September 3	**Colorado**	Georgia Tech	ACC	Bobby Dodd Stadium • Atlanta, GA	**W** 14–13
September 5	**Cincinnati**	Boston College	ACC	Nippert Stadium • Cincinnati, OH	**W** 34–15
September 5	Baylor†	**Auburn**	SEC	Mercedes-Benz Stadium • Atlanta, GA	**L** 16–17
September 11	Kansas	**No. 23 Missouri**	SEC	David Booth Kansas Memorial Stadium • Lawrence, KS	**L** 21–38
September 12	Arizona State	**No. 10 Texas A&M**	SEC	Kyle Field • College Station, TX	**L** 20–48
September 12	Iowa State	**No. 21 Iowa**	Big Ten	Kinnick Stadium • Iowa City, IA	**L** 13–16
September 12	UCF	**Pitt**	ACC	Acrisure Stadium • Pittsburgh, PA	**L** 7–12
September 12	**Oklahoma State**	No. 6 Oregon	Big Ten	Boone Pickens Stadium • Stillwater, OK	**W** 39–31
September 12	**No. 20 Utah**	Arkansas	SEC	Rice–Eccles Stadium • Salt Lake City, UT	**W** 43–10
September 19	Colorado	**Northwestern**	Big Ten	Ryan Field • Evanston, IL	**L** 7–41
September 19	**West Virginia**†	No. 25 Virginia	ACC	Bank of America Stadium • Charlotte, NC	**W** 38–27
October 17	**No. 8 BYU**	No. 2 Notre Dame	Independent	LaVell Edwards Stadium • Provo, UT	**W** 28–24

Note:† Denotes Neutral Site Game

=== Big 12 vs. Group of Five matchups ===
The following games include Big 12 teams competing against teams from The American, CUSA, MAC, Mountain West, Pac-12 or Sun Belt.

Date	Conference	Visitor	Home	Site	Score
September 5	Pac-12	Oregon State	No. 23 Houston	TDECU Stadium • Houston, TX	**W** 33–20
September 5	Sun Belt	Coastal Carolina	West Virginia	Milan Puskar Stadium • Morgantown, WV	**W** 31–24
September 5	American	Oklahoma State	Tulsa	Skelly Field at H. A. Chapman Stadium • Tulsa, OK	**L** 10–24
September 12	Pac-12	Washington State	Kansas State	Bill Snyder Family Football Stadium • Manhattan, KS	**W** 34–7
September 12	Pac-12	Oregon State	No. 13 Texas Tech	Reser Stadium • Corvallis, OR	**W** 35–24
September 19	Mountain West	Northern Illinois	Arizona	Casino Del Sol Stadium • Tucson, AZ	**W** 42–17
September 19	MAC	Miami (OH)	Cincinnati	Paycor Stadium • Cincinnati, OH	**W** 35–33
September 19	MAC	Bowling Green	Iowa State	Jack Trice Stadium • Ames, IA	**W** 55–7
September 19	American	Tulane	Kansas State	Bill Snyder Family Football Stadium • Manhattan, KS	**W** 31–20
September 19	Sun Belt	Arkansas State	TCU	Amon G. Carter Stadium • Fort Worth, TX	**W** 31–7
September 19	Sun Belt	Louisiana Tech	Baylor	McLane Stadium • Waco, TX	**W** 36–19
September 19	Sun Belt	Georgia State	UCF	Acrisure Bounce House • Orlando, FL	**W** 44–30
September 19	Pac-12	Utah State	No. 17 Utah	Rice–Eccles Stadium • Salt Lake City, UT	**W** 35–33
September 19	Pac-12	Colorado State	No. 11 BYU	Canvas Stadium • Fort Collins, CO	**W** 41–23
September 26	Pac-12	Washington State	Arizona	Martin Stadium • Pullman, WA	**W** 34–24
September 26	Sun Belt	Georgia Southern	No. 25 Houston	Paulson Stadium • Statesboro, GA	**W** 42–28
September 26	CUSA	Sam Houston	No. 11 Texas Tech	Jones AT&T Stadium • Lubbock, TX	**W** 49–14
October 3	CUSA	Middle Tennessee	Kansas	David Booth Kansas Memorial Stadium • Lawrence, KS	**W** 55–0
October 10	Mountain West	Hawaii	Arizona State	Mountain America Stadium • Tempe, AZ	**W** 30–12

=== Big 12 vs. FCS matchups ===
The Football Championship Subdivision comprises 13 conferences and two independent programs.

Date	Conference	Visitor	Home	Site	Score
September 3	SWAC	Bethune-Cookman	UCF	Acrisure Bounce House • Orlando, FL	**W** 73–0
September 3	Big Sky	Idaho	No. 21 Utah	Rice–Eccles Stadium • Salt Lake City, UT	**W** 66–14
September 4	NEC	LIU	Kansas	David Booth Kansas Memorial Stadium • Lawrence, KS	**W** 51–6
September 5	OVC–Big South	Southeast Missouri	Iowa State	Jack Trice Stadium • Ames, IA	**W** 38–10
September 5	MEAC	Morgan State	Arizona State	Mountain America Stadium • Tempe, AZ	**W** 70–7
September 5	Big Sky	No. 25 (FCS) Northern Arizona	Arizona	Casino Del Sol Stadium • Tucson, AZ	**W** 35–7
September 5	UAC	Utah Tech	No. 14т BYU	LaVell Edwards Stadium • Provo, UT	**W** 63–7
September 5	UAC	No. 15 (FCS) Abilene Christian	No. 12 Texas Tech	Jones AT&T Stadium • Lubbock, TX	**W** 33–10
September 5	Southland	Nicholls	Kansas State	Bill Snyder Family Football Stadium • Manhattan, KS	**W** 71–3
September 12	So−Con	Western Carolina	Cincinnati	Nippert Stadium • Cincinnati, OH	**W** 62–10
September 12	SWAC	Grambling State	TCU	Amon G. Carter Stadium • Fort Worth, TX	**W** 63–7
September 12	SWAC	Prairie View A&M	Baylor	McLane Stadium • Waco, TX	**W** 44–3
September 12	SWAC	Southern	No. 22 Houston	TDECU Stadium • Houston, TX	**W** 77–6
September 12	Big Sky	Weber State	Colorado	Folsom Field • Boulder, CO	**W** 52–21
September 12	OVC–Big South	UT Martin	West Virginia	Milan Puskar Stadium • Morgantown, WV	**W** 52–7
September 19	Missouri Valley	Murray State	Oklahoma State	Boone Pickens Stadium • Stillwater, OK	**W** 59–0

Note:† Denotes Neutral Site Game

=== Record vs. other conferences ===
**Regular Season**

Power 4 Conferences	Record
ACC	3–2
Big Ten	1–2
Notre Dame	1–0
SEC	1–3
Power 4 Total	6–7
Other FBS Conferences	Record
American	1–1
CUSA	2–0
Independents (Excluding Notre Dame)	0–0
MAC	2–0
Mountain West	2–0
Pac-12	6–0
Sun Belt	5–0
Other FBS Total	18–1
FCS Opponents	Record
Football Championship Subdivision	16–0
Total Non-Conference Record	40–8

**Post Season**

Power 4 Conferences	Record
ACC	0–0
Big Ten	0–0
SEC	0–0
Power 4 Total	0–0
Other FBS Conferences	Record
American	0–0
CUSA	0–0
Independents (Excluding Notre Dame)	0–0
MAC	0–0
Mountain West	0–0
Pac-12	0–0
Sun Belt	0–0
Other FBS Total	0–0
Total Bowl Record	0–0

=== Team Scoring ===
Scoring
Team	Points For	Points Against	Difference
Arizona	347	219	128
Arizona State	282	259	23
Baylor	294	181	113
BYU	307	185	122
Cincinnati	310	306	4
Colorado	220	287	-67
Houston	351	234	117
Iowa State	321	321	0
Kansas	302	237	65
Kansas State	292	261	31
Oklahoma State	422	297	125
TCU	234	152	82
Texas Tech	390	244	146
UCF	332	277	55
Utah	379	186	193
West Virginia	349	348	1

== Television Selections ==
The Big 12 Conference has television contracts with ESPN and FOX, which allow games to be broadcast across ABC, ESPN, ESPN2, ESPNU, ESPNews, FOX, FS1 and FS2 and TNT Sports. Streaming broadcasts for games under Big 12 control are streamed on ESPN+. Games under the control of other conferences fall under the contracts of the opposing conference.

Network	Wk 0	Wk 1	Wk 2	Wk 3	Wk 4	Wk 5	Wk 6	Wk 7	Wk 8	Wk 9	Wk 10	Wk 11	Wk 12	Wk 13	Wk 14	C	Bowls	NCG	Totals
ABC	–	1	1	–	–	–	–	1	–	–	1	–	1	–	–	1	–	–	6
ESPN	1	2	2	–	1	2	1	1	1	3	2	2	1	1	–	–	–	–	20
ESPN2	–	–	1	1	2	1	1	–	3	–	2	1	–	2	–	–	–	–	14
ESPNews	–	–	–	–	–	–	1	–	–	–	–	–	–	–	–	–	–	–	1
ESPNU	–	–	–	–	–	–	–	–	–	–	–	2	–	–	–	–	–	–	2
FOX	–	1	2	3	1	2	1	2	1	2	1	2	2	3	–	–	–	–	23
NBC	–	–	1	–	–	–	–	–	–	–	–	–	–	–	–	–	–	–	1
FS1	–	1	–	1	2	–	1	2	2	1	1	–	2	–	–	–	–	–	13
CBS	–	–	1	1	1	–	–	–	–	–	–	–	–	–	–	–	–	–	3
The CW	–	–	–	–	–	–	–	–	–	–	–	–	–	–	–	–	–	–	–
CBS Sports Network	–	–	–	–	–	–	–	–	–	–	–	–	–	–	–	–	–	–	–
SEC Network	–	–	–	–	–	–	–	–	–	–	–	–	–	–	–	–	–	–	–
ACC Network	–	–	–	1	–	–	–	–	–	–	–	–	–	–	–	–	–	–	1
TNT	–	1	1	1	1	1	1	1	1	1	1	1	1	1	–	–	–	–	13
ESPN+/HBO Max(streaming)	–	6	6	3	–	–	–	–	–	–	–	–	1	1	–	–	–	–	17

Platform	Games
Broadcast	33
Cable	66
Streaming	17

== Awards and honors ==
=== Players of the week ===
Week	Offensive			Defensive			Special Teams			Freshman			Offensive Line	Defensive Line
Week	Player	Team	Position	Player	Team	Position	Player	Team	Position	Player	Team	Position	Team	
Week 1 (Sept. 7)	Cutter Boley; Cam Cook	Arizona State West Virginia	QB; RB	Lamont Lester Jr. Isaac Terrell	Colorado Iowa State	DL; DE	Boo Carter; Cannon DeVries	Colorado BYU	DB	Legend Glasker	BYU	WR	Cincinnati	Colorado
Week 2 (Sept. 14)	Bear Bachmeier; Drew Mestemaker	BYU Oklahoma State	QB	Tausili Akana; Ethan Wesloski	BYU Oklahoma State	DE; LB	Will Karoll; Sam Keltner	Texas Tech Oklahoma State	P PK	Julian Lewis	Colorado	QB	Oklahoma State	
Week 3 (Sept. 21)	Noah Fifita; Michael Hawkins Jr.	Arizona West Virginia	QB	Demari Henderson; Owen Long	UCF Arizona State	DB; LB	Will Karoll (2); Jaren Hamilton	Texas Tech Arizona State	P KR	Legend Glasker	BYU	WR	West Virginia	Kansas State
Week 4 (Sept. 28)	Drew Mestemaker (2); Wayshawn Parker	Oklahoma State Utah	QB; RB	Austin Romaine; Ethan Wesloski (2)	Texas Tech Oklahoma State	LB	Sam Keltner (2); Palmer Williams	Oklahoma State Baylor	K P	Caleb Smith	Arizona	WR	Oklahoma State	UCF
Week 5 (Oct. 5)	Aiden Flora; DJ Lagway	Iowa State Baylor	RB; QB	Brice Pollock; Faletau Satuala	Texas Tech BYU	DB	Jonathan Dimas; Will Karoll (3)	Houston Texas Tech	K P	Reylan Morris	Baylor	RB	Iowa State	Arizona
Week 6 (Oct. 12)	Bear Bachmeier (2); Patrick Overmyer	BYU Houston	QB; TE	Owen Long; Ethan Wesloski (3)	Arizona State Oklahoma State	LB	Liam Dougherty; Sam Keltner (3)	Houston Oklahoma State	P K	Cardae Mack	Arizona State	RB	Utah	BYU
Week 7 (Oct. 19)	Bear Bachmeier (3); Conner Weigman	BYU Houston	QB	Koron Hayward; Cade Uluave	TCU BYU	DL; LB	Stone Harrington; Luis Rodriguez	Texas Tech Kansas State	K	Nick McClellan	Kansas State	DB	BYU	Texas Tech
Week 8 (Oct. 26)	Keyone Jenkins; Cole Tabb	UCF Cincinnati	QB; RB	MJ Cannon; LaDainian Fields	Cincinnati Oklahoma State	DB	Blake Herold; Sam Keltner (4)	Kansas Oklahoma State	DT; K	Cardae Mack (2)	Arizona State	RB	Cincinnati	
Week 9 (Nov. 2)	Aiden Flora (2); DJ Lagway (2)	Iowa State Baylor	RB; QB	Elijah Davis; Gideon ESPN Lampron	Utah Colorado	DB; LB	Matthias Dunn; Kyle Konrardy	BYU Iowa State	K	Jamal Polite Jr.	Iowa State	WR	Texas Tech	Baylor
Week 10 (Nov. 9)	Tommy Castellanos; Devon Dampier	Texas Tech Utah	QB	LaDainian Fields; Gideon ESPN Lampron	Oklahoma State Colorado	DB; LB	Michael Salgado-Medina; Palmer Williams (2)	Arizona Baylor	K P	Jake Fette	Arizona State	QB	Texas Tech	Arizona State
Week 11 (Nov. 16)	Devon Dampier (2); Aiden Flora (3)	Utah Iowa State	QB; RB	Randon Fontenette; Leroy Harris III	Colorado Kansas	DB; DL	Malcolm Simmons; Carson Smith	Texas Tech Arizona State	KR; K	Cardae Mack (3)	Arizona State	RB	Colorado	Kansas
Week 12 (Nov. 23)														
Week 13 (Nov. 30)														

==== Totals per school ====
School	Total
Oklahoma State	14
BYU	12
Texas Tech	11
Arizona State	10
Colorado	8
Iowa State	7
Baylor	6
Cincinnati	5
Utah	5
Arizona	4
Houston	4
Kansas	3
Kansas State	3
UCF	3
West Virginia	3
TCU	1

=== Big 12 individual awards ===
The following individuals received postseason honors as voted by the Big 12 Conference coaches at the end of the season.

Award	Player	School
Offensive Player of the Year		
Defensive Player of the Year		
Special Teams Player of the Year		
Offensive Freshman of the Year		
Offensive Lineman of the Year		
Defensive Freshman of the Year		
Defensive Lineman of the Year		
Offensive Newcomer of the Year		
Defensive Newcomer of the Year		
Chuck Neinas Coach of the Year		
# - Unanimous choice

=== All-Americans ===
Currently, the NCAA compiles consensus all-America teams in the sports of Division I-FBS football and Division I men's basketball using a point system computed from All-America teams named by coaches associations or media sources. The system consists of three points for a first-team honor, two points for second-team honor, and one point for third-team honor. Honorable mention and fourth team or lower recognitions are not accorded any points. College Football All-American consensus teams are compiled by position and the player accumulating the most points at each position is named first team consensus all-American. Currently, the NCAA recognizes All-Americans selected by the AP, AFCA, FWAA, TSN, and the WCFF to determine Consensus and Unanimous All-Americans. Any player named to the First Team by all five of the NCAA-recognized selectors is deemed a Unanimous All-American.

Position	Player	School	Selector	Unanimous	Consensus
**First Team All-Americans**

Position	Player	School	Selector	Unanimous	Consensus
**Second Team All-Americans**

Position	Player	School	Selector	Unanimous	Consensus
**Third Team All-Americans**\

==== List of All American Teams ====
- 2026 **AFCA** All-America Team
- 2026 **Associated Press** All-America Team
- 2026 **FWAA** All-America Team
- **Sporting News** 2026 College Football All-America Team
- **Walter Camp Football Foundation** 2026 All-America Team
- 2026 The Athletic All-America Team
- 2026 Athlon Sports College Football's Postseason All-America Team
- 2026 CBS Sports All-America Team
- 2026 College Football News
- 2026 ESPN All-America Team
- 2026 Fox Sports All-America Team
- 2026 PFF College All-America team
- 2026 Phil Steele's Postseason All-America Team
- Sports Illustrated 2026 All-America Team
- USA Today 2026 All-America Team

=== All-conference teams ===
The following players earned All-Big 12 honors. Any teams showing (_) following their name are indicating the number of All-Big 12 Conference Honors awarded to that university for 1st team and 2nd team respectively.

**First Team**

Position	Player	Class	Team
**First Team Offense**
QB			
RB			
WR			
TE/FLEX			
OL			
**First Team Defense**
DL			
LB			
DB			
**First Team Special Teams**
PK			
P			
RS			
Specialist			

**Second Team**

Position	Player	Class	Team
**Second Team Offense**
QB			
RB			
WR			
TE/FLEX			
OL			
**Second Team Defense**
DL			
LB			
DB			
**Second Team Special Teams**
PK			
P			
RS			
Specialist			

**Third Team**

Position	Player	Class	Team
**Third Team Offense**
QB			
RB			
WR			
TE/FLEX			
OL			
**Third Team Defense**
DL			
LB			
DB			
**Third Team Special Teams**
PK			
P			
RS			
Specialist			

Notes:

- RS = Return Specialist
- AP/ST = All-Purpose/Special Teams Player (not a kicker or returner)
- † Two-time first team selection;
- ‡ Three-time first team selection

Honorable mentions

- Arizona:
- Arizona State:
- Baylor:
- BYU:
- Cincinnati:
- Colorado:
- Houston:
- Iowa State:
- Kansas:
- Kansas State:
- Oklahoma State:
- TCU:
- Texas Tech:
- UCF:
- Utah:
- West Virginia:

=== National award winners ===
2026 College Football Award Winners

Award	Player	School

== Rankings ==
Legend
	Improvement in ranking
	Drop in ranking
	Not ranked previous week
	No change in ranking from previous week
RV	Received votes but were not ranked in Top 25 of poll
т	Tied with team above or below also with this symbol

		Pre	Wk 1	Wk 2	Wk 3	Wk 4	Wk 5	Wk 6	Wk 7	Wk 8	Wk 9	Wk 10	Wk 11	Wk 12	Wk 13	Wk 14	Wk 15	Final
Arizona	AP	RV	RV	RV	RV	RV	RV	RV	25	22	24	22	19	16				
Arizona	C	RV	RV	RV	RV	RV	RV	RV	RV	21	22	21	20	16				
Arizona	CFP	Not released									22	23	19					
Arizona State	AP		RV															
Arizona State	C	RV	RV															
Arizona State	CFP	Not released																
Baylor	AP																	
Baylor	C						RV	RV										
Baylor	CFP	Not released																
BYU	AP	14т	15	11	9	10	8	8	2	8	7	12	12	9				
BYU	C	15	15	13	9	9	8	8	3	9	8	12	12	11				
BYU	CFP	Not released									9	10	10					
Cincinnati	AP					RV				RV								
Cincinnati	C					RV				RV	RV							
Cincinnati	CFP	Not released																
Colorado	AP		RV															
Colorado	C		RV															
Colorado	CFP	Not released																
Houston	AP	23	22	22	25	20	22	20	14	18	17	14	20	17				
Houston	C	24	22	23	RV	20	19	18	16	19	18	16	21	17				
Houston	CFP	Not released									17	14	20					
Iowa State	AP																	
Iowa State	C																	
Iowa State	CFP	Not released																
Kansas	AP																	
Kansas	C																	
Kansas	CFP	Not released																
Kansas State	AP			RV	RV													
Kansas State	C	RV	RV	RV	RV		RV											
Kansas State	CFP	Not released																
Oklahoma State	AP	RV		RV	RV	19	18	18	RV	24	RV	RV		RV				
Oklahoma State	C	RV		RV	RV	RV	RV	20	RV	RV	RV	RV	RV	RV				
Oklahoma State	CFP	Not released																
TCU	AP	RV																
TCU	C	RV																
TCU	CFP	Not released																
Texas Tech	AP	12	13	13	11	12	11	10	8	13	13	10	11	9				
Texas Tech	C	12	13	12	10	10	9	9	5	14	13	10	11	9				
Texas Tech	CFP	Not released									15	12	12					
UCF	AP																	
UCF	C																	
UCF	CFP	Not released																
Utah	AP	21	20	17	15	13	12	11	10	6	3	2	2	2				
Utah	C	21	20	17	15	13	12	11	9	5	4	2	2	2				
Utah	CFP	Not released									3	2	2					
West Virginia	AP				RV													
West Virginia	C				RV													
West Virginia	CFP	Not released																

== Home game announced attendance ==
Team	Stadium	Capacity	Game 1	Game 2	Game 3	Game 4	Game 5	Game 6	Game 7	Total	Average	% of capacity
Arizona	Casino Del Sol Stadium	50,782	40,129	40,413	43,760	45,477	40,501	48,858†		259,138	43,190	85.0%
Arizona State	Mountain America Stadium	53,599	**54,004**	**54,063**	47,931	46,388	**54,166**†	51,154		307,705	51,284	95.6%
Baylor	McLane Stadium	45,140	38,642	41,343	40,015	**46,634**	39,229	**46,765**†		252,628	42,105	93.2%
BYU	LaVell Edwards Stadium	62,073	**64,077**	**64,409**	**64,632**	**65,179**†	**63,332**	**63,008**		384,637	64,106	103.6%
Cincinnati	Nippert Stadium	38,193	37,097	34,827	37,562	38,088†	36,487	36,792		220,853	36,809	95.3%
Colorado	Folsom Field	50,183	49,363	50,106	**52,489**†	46,325	47,495			245,778	49,166	97.9%
Houston	TDECU Stadium	40,000	28,742	28,936	25,593	**42,544**†	32,372			158,187	31,367	79.0%
Iowa State	Jack Trice Stadium	61,500	51,802	50,395	52,150†	52,724	50,295	50,162		307,528	51,255	83.3%
Kansas	David Booth Kansas Memorial Stadium	32,000	30,904	**32,000**†	**32,000**†	**32,000**†	31,008	30,121		188,033	31,339	97.9%
Kansas State	Bill Snyder Family Stadium	50,000	**51,719**	**51,759**	**51,846**	**51,569**	**51,961**	**52,134**†	49,807	360,795	51,542	103.0%
Oklahoma State	Boone Pickens Stadium	52,168	51,035	**52,168**†	**52,168**†	**52,168**†	**52,168**†			259,707	51,941	99.5%
TCU	Amon G. Carter Stadium	46,000	37,600	**46,139**†	38,327	36,216	32,549	37,203	36,906	264,940	37,849	82.2%
Texas Tech	Galaxy Stadium	60,229	**60,229**†	**60,229**†	59,704	**60,229**†	59,131	**60,229**†		359,751	59,959	99.5%
UCF	Acrisure Bounce House	44,206	43,127	**44,620**	43,212	**45,112**	**45,906**†	44,114	34,043	300,154	42,879	96.9%
Utah	Rice–Eccles Stadium	51,444	**51,444**	**51,532**	**51,455**	**51,467**	**51,864**	**52,901**†		310,663	51,777	100.6%
West Virginia	Milan Puskar Stadium	60,000	54,158†	47,049	57,756	50,121	48,106	45,629	37,380	340,199	48,600	80.9%
Total		49,845								4,520,969	46,605	93.5%

Bold – at or exceeded capacity
† Season high
‡ Record stadium Attendance
