= Gulliver Preparatory School =

Private school in Kendall, Florida, US

Coordinates: 25.689269°N 80.3003294°W

- Coral Gables, Florida, Pinecrest, Florida, Miami, Florida, U.S.

Information
- Type: Private, Independent
- Opened: 1926 (Gulliver Academy); 1975 (Gulliver Preparatory School)
- Head of school: Dr. Tom Milaschewski
- Grades: PK - 12
- Campuses: The Prep- Upper School MCK- PK-8
- Campus type: Suburban
- Colors: Navy Blue; White
- Mascot: Raider
- Rivals: Ransom Everglades School
- Website: http://www.gulliverprep.org

Gulliver Preparatory School or simply Gulliver Prep, is a private co-educational school. Its management offices are in Kendall, Florida, a census-designated place in Miami-Dade County, Florida. Its previous administrative offices were in Coral Gables, Florida.

== History ==
=== 20th century ===
Gulliver Academy was founded in 1926 by Arthur Gulliver in Coconut Grove, Gulliver School was likened to the prestigious academies of the Northeast, initially attracting families who spent the winter months in Florida. In 1952 Marian Krutulis purchased it, reopening it in 1954 and moving it to the Coral Gables site in 1967. High School classes were added; the first senior class graduated in 1977. It is a for-profit school. The Miller Drive Campus opened in 1996.

=== 21st century ===
Marian Cline Krutulis, the school's owner, also served as director of the school until 2007 when she was succeeded by her son, John Krutulis. Jonathan M. Schoenwald became the principal of the prep school in 2014. With a PhD in American history from Stanford University and administrative experience at Hunter College of the City University of New York, Princeton University, and Stanford, Schoenwald's appointment was unusual for a high school.

In 2022, Gulliver Preparatory opened a new center for student life, located at its Marian C. Krutulis PK-8 Campus.

== Campuses ==
The school reports more than 2,200 students enrolled at two campuses.

- Gulliver Prep – Marian C. Krutulis PK-8 Campus - Coral Gables
- Gulliver Prep – Upper School Campus – Pinecrest
Campuses in the Miami area

== Academics ==
Gulliver Prep offers honors, International Baccalaureate program, Advanced Placement, and The EDGE Program work and extracurricular experiences. Gulliver offers more than 30 AP courses, an internship program, and dual enrollment opportunities at the University of Miami, Florida International University and Miami-Dade College.

== Athletics ==
Gulliver's teams, The Raiders, have won district, regional, sectional, state runner-up, and state championships, as well as numerous conference championships. Gulliver currently competes in 1A through 5A classifications, depending on the sport.

Gulliver's Florida state championships include:

=== Girls ===
- Girls' Swimming: 2018

== Student Life ==
=== Broadcast Channel ===
RaiderVision is Gulliver's student-run broadcast journalism program.

=== Newspaper ===
The Raider Voice is Gulliver's student-run newspaper.

=== FHSAA team championships by sport ===
Sport	Gender	Championships	Years	Runner-up	Years	Notes
Baseball		1	2004	2	1998, 2010	
Basketball	Boys	0		0		
	Girls	1	2004	0		
Cross Country	Boys	3	1998, 1999, 2001	0		In 1999, cross-country became the first team to win back-to-back titles in Miami-Dade County
	Girls	2	1990, 1997	1	1996	
Football		1	2001	1	2008	Team featured Sean Taylor and Buck Ortega. The 2019 Raiders football team was the first team to go undefeated in the regular season.
Golf	Boys	10		0		
	Girls	10		0		
Lacrosse	Boys	10		0		
Soccer	Boys	40	1992, 1999, 2000, 2006, 2014, 2015, 2020, 2023, 2024	2	2013, 2021	
	Girls	10	2011	4	1997, 1999, 2001, 2013	
Softball		6	1998, 2001, 2010, 2011, 2012, 2013	1	2007	
Swimming	Boys	10	2016,	4	1981, 1982, 1983, 2017	
	Girls	4	2014, 2015, 2016, 2017	1	2005	
Tennis	Boys	10	2003, 2005, 2007, 2008, 2009, 2010, 2011, 2013, 2014, 2019	3	2002, 2004, 2012	
	Girls	7	1994, 1997, 2006, 2007, 2013, 2014, 2019	4	1999, 2002, 2003, 2012	
Track & Field	Boys	0		0		
	Girls	10	1998	2	2002, 2003	
Volleyball	Girls	0		0		
Water Polo	Boys	5	2007, 2012, 2014, 2021, 2024	3	2001, 2006, 2011	
	Girls	10	2001, 2002, 2003, 2004, 2005, 2006, 2007, 2008, 2013, 2025	5	1998, 2000, 2014, 2017, 2021	
Total		61		32		

Source: FHSAA.org

== Notable alumni ==
- Alexander Acosta, attorney and former U.S. Secretary of Labor
- Michael Baiamonte, public address announcer, Miami Heat
- Francisco de Borbón von Hardenberg, relative of the Spanish royal family
- George P. Bush, attorney, former Texas General Land Office commissioner, eldest child of Jeb Bush
- Soman Chainani, author
- Nelson Dellis, memory athlete
- Tony Dokoupil, author and current anchor of CBS Evening News
- CJ Donaldson, NFL player, New Orleans Saints
- Joe Dunand, baseball player
- Sylvia Fowles, basketball player
- Craig Gottlieb, reality television personality
- Enrique Iglesias, singer and songwriter
- Julio Iglesias Jr., singer and songwriter
- Joe Jackson, football player
- Evan Kravetz, baseball player
- Trey Lathan, college football player, Kansas Jayhawks
- George Lombard Jr., baseball player
- Jacob Lombard, baseball player
- Buck Ortega, football player
- Pedro Pagés (catcher), baseball player, St. Louis Cardinals
- Patrick Robinson, football player
- Paco Rodriguez, baseball player, Los Angeles Dodgers
- Blake Ross, software engineer and co-creator, Firefox
- Eduardo Saverin, co-founder, Facebook
- Andrew Talansky, triathlete
- Sean Taylor, football player
