= 2025 All-Big 12 Conference football team =

Collegiate American football team

The 2025 All-Big 12 Conference football team consisted of American football players chosen as All-Big 12 Conference players for the 2025 Big 12 Conference football season. The conference recognizes two official All-Big 12 selectors: (1) the Big 12 conference coaches selected separate offensive and defensive units and named first- and second-team players (the "Coaches" team); and (2) a panel of sports writers and broadcasters covering the Big 12 also selected offensive and defensive units and named first- and second-team players (the "Media" team).

== Offensive selections ==
=== Quarterbacks ===
- Noah Fifita, Arizona (Coaches-1; Media-1)
- Sawyer Robertson, Baylor (Media-2)
- Brendan Sorsby, Cincinnati (Coaches-2)
- Devon Dampier, Utah (Coaches-3)

=== Running backs ===
- LJ Martin, BYU (Coaches-1; Media-1)
- Raleek Brown, Arizona State (Coaches-1; Media-2)
- Cameron Dickey, Texas Tech (Coaches-2; Media-1)
- Carson Hansen, Iowa State (Coaches-2; Media-2)
- Joe Jackson, Kansas State (Coaches-3)
- Wayshawn Parker, Utah (Coaches-3)

=== Offensive linemen ===
- Omar Aigbedion, Baylor (Coaches-1; Media-1)
- Spencer Fano, Utah (Coaches-1; Media-1)
- Caleb Lomu, Utah (Coaches-1; Media-1)
- Bruce Mitchell, BYU (Coaches-1; Media-1)
- Sam Hecht, Kansas State (Coaches-1; Media-2)
- Evan Tengesdahl, Cincinnati (Coaches-2; Media-1)
- Max Iheanachor, Arizona State (Coaches-2; Media-2)
- Joe Cotton, Cincinnati (Coaches-2; Media-2)
- Kobe Baynes, Kansas (Media-2)
- Davion Carter, Texas Tech (Media-2)
- John Pastore, Kansas State (Coaches-2)
- Jordan Seaton, Colorado (Coaches-2)
- Isaiah Jatta, BYU (Coaches-3)
- Gavin Gerhardt, Cincinnati (Coaches-3)
- Tyler Miller, Iowa State (Coaches-3)
- Howard Sampson, Texas Tech (Coaches-3)
- Sheridan Wilson, Texas Tech (Coaches-3)

=== Tight ends / flex ===
- Michael Trigg, Baylor (Coaches-1; Media-1)
- Tanner Koziol, Houston (Coaches-1; Media-2)
- Benjamin Brahmer, Iowa State (Coaches-2)
- Terrance Carter Jr., Texas Tech (Coaches-2)
- Joe Royer, Cincinnati (Coaches-3)
- Dallen Bentley, Utah (Coaches-3)

=== Receivers ===
- Eric McAlister, TCU (Coaches-1; Media-1)
- Amare Thomas, Houston (Coaches-1; Media-1)
- Josh Cameron, Baylor (Coaches-1; Media-2)
- Jordyn Tyson, Arizona State (Coaches-1; Media-2)
- Cyrus Allen, Cincinnati (Coaches-2)
- Caleb Douglas, Texas Tech (Coaches-2)
- Parker Kingston, BYU (Coaches-2)
- Omarion Miller, Colorado (Coaches-2)
- Jayce Brown, Kansas State (Coaches-3)
- Emmanuel Henderson, Kansas (Coaches-3)
- Kris Hutson, Arizona (Coaches-3)
- Chase Roberts, BYU (Coaches-3)

== Defensive selections ==
=== Defensive linemen ===
- David Bailey, Texas Tech (Coaches-1; Media-1)
- John Henry Daley, Utah (Coaches-1; Media-1)
- Lee Hunter, Texas Tech (Coaches-1; Media-1)
- Romello Height, Texas Tech (Coaches-1; Media-2)
- Malachi Lawrence, UCF (Coaches-1; Media-2)
- Carlos Allen Jr., Houston (Coaches-2; Media-2)
- Dontay Corleone, Cincinnati (Coaches-2; Media-2)
- A.J. Holmes Jr., Texas Tech (Coaches-3; Media-2)
- Devean Deal, TCU (Coaches-2)
- Logan Fano, Utah (Coaches-2)
- Eddie Walls III, Houston (Coaches-2)
- Prince Dorbah, Arizona State (Coaches-3)
- Wendell Gregory, Oklahoma State (Coaches-3)
- Domonique Orange, Iowa State (Coaches-3)
- Justin Wodtly, Arizona State (Coaches-3)

=== Linebackers ===
- Kaleb Elarms-Orr, TCU (Coaches-1; Media-1)
- Jacob Rodriguez, Texas Tech (Coaches-1; Media-1)
- Jack Kelly, BYU (Coaches-1; Media-2)
- Keyshaun Elliott, Arizona State (Coaches-2; Media-2)
- Keaton Thomas, Baylor (Coaches-2; Media-2)
- Jake Golday, Cincinnati (Coaches-1)
- Jordan Crook, Arizona State (Coaches-2)
- Austin Romaine, Kansas State (Coaches-2)
- Taye Brown, Arizona (Coaches-3)
- Isaiah Glasker, BYU (Coaches-3)
- Cole Kozlowski, UCF (Coaches-3)
- Ben Roberts, Texas Tech (Coaches-3)

=== Defensive backs ===
- Keith Abney II, Arizona State (Coaches-1; Media-1)
- Brice Pollock, Texas Tech (Coaches-1; Media-1)
- Tanner Wall, BYU (Coaches-1; Media-1)
- Dalton Johnson, Arizona (Coaches-1; Media-1)
- Treydan Stukes, Arizona (Coaches-1; Media-2)
- Bud Clark, TCU (Coaches-2; Media-2)
- Jamel Johnson, TCU (Coaches-2; Media-2)
- Latrell McCutchin Sr., Houston (Coaches-2; Media-2)
- Will James, Houston (Coaches-2)
- Smith Snowden, Utah (Coaches-2)
- Jay'Vion Cole, Arizona (Coaches-3)
- Marcus Neal Jr., Iowa State (Coaches-3)
- Myles Rowser, Arizona State (Coaches-3)
- Faletau Satuala, BYU (Coaches-3)
- Genesis Smith, Arizona (Coaches-3)

== Special teams ==
=== Kickers ===
- Stone Harrington, Texas Tech (Coaches-1; Media-1)
- Noe Ruelas, UCF (Coaches-3; Media-2)
- Will Ferrin, BYU (Coaches-2)

=== Punters ===
- Palmer Williams, Baylor (Coaches-1; Media-1)
- Wes Pahl, Oklahoma State (Coaches-1; Media-2)
- Max Fletcher, Cincinnati (Coaches-2)
- Laith Marjan, Kansas (Coaches-3)

=== All-purpose / return specialists ===
- Emmanuel Henderson, Kansas (Coaches-1; Media-2)
- Parker Kingston, BYU (Coaches-2; Media-1)
- J'Koby Williams, Texas Tech (Coaches-3)

=== Specialists ===
- Micah Gifford, Baylor (Coaches-1)
- Jacob Garza, Houston (Coaches-2)
- Aiden Flora, Iowa State (Coaches-2)
- Bryce Ramirez, Texas Tech (Coaches-3)

== Key ==
Bold = selected as a first-team player by both the coaches and media panel

Coaches = selected by Big 12 Conference coaches

Media = selected by a media panel

== See also ==
- 2025 All-America college football team
