= Dallin Holker =

American football player (born 2000)

No. 85
- Position: Tight end

Personal information
- Born: April 7, 2000 (age 26); Lehi, Utah, U.S.
- Listed height: 6 ft 3 in (1.91 m)
- Listed weight: 241 lb (109 kg)

Career information
- High school: Lehi
- College: BYU (2018–2022); Colorado State (2023)
- NFL draft: 2024: undrafted

Career history
- New Orleans Saints (2024)

Awards and highlights
- Second-team All-American (2023); First-team All-Mountain West (2023)

Career NFL statistics
- Receptions: 3
- Receiving yards: 21
- Stats at Pro Football Reference

Dallin Holker (born April 7, 2000) is an American former professional football player who was a tight end in the National Football League (NFL). He played one season for the New Orleans Saints after going undrafted in the 2024 NFL draft. Holker played college football for the BYU Cougars and Colorado State Rams.

== Early life ==
Holker attended Lehi High School in Lehi, Utah. As a senior, he had 97 receptions 1,766 yards and 22 touchdowns and was named the Deseret News 5A MVP. He committed to Brigham Young University (BYU) to play college football.

== College career ==
As a true freshman at BYU in 2018, he played in 12 games and had 19 receptions for 235 yards and a touchdown. Holker spent 2019 and 2020 on his Mormon mission and did not play football. He returned in 2021 to play in 13 games and recorded 14 receptions for 200 yards and a touchdown. After playing in three games in 2022, he entered the transfer portal. In December 2022, Holker announced he was transferring to Colorado State University. He became the starting tight end at Colorado State in 2023. In 2023, Holker was one of three finalists for the Mackey Award which is awarded to the nation's best tight end.

== Professional career ==
Pre-draft measurables
Height	Weight	Arm length	Hand span	40-yard dash	10-yard split	20-yard split	20-yard shuttle	Three-cone drill	Vertical jump	Broad jump	Bench press
6 ft 3 3/8 in (1.91 m)	241 lb (109 kg)	33 5/8 in (0.85 m)	10 1/4 in (0.26 m)	4.78 s	1.66 s	2.81 s	4.21 s	6.83 s	32.5 in (0.83 m)	10 ft 2 in (3.10 m)	15 reps
All values from NFL Combine/Pro Day

Holker signed with the New Orleans Saints as an undrafted free agent on April 27, 2024. He was also selected by the Birmingham Stallions in the fifth round of the 2024 UFL draft on July 17. Holker was one of four Saints UDFAs to make the team's initial 53 man roster. He made 12 appearances (two starts) for New Orleans during his rookie campaign, recording three catches for 21 yards.

On July 22, 2025, Holker announced his retirement from the NFL via Instagram.

== Personal life ==
Holker is a member of the Church of Jesus Christ of Latter-day Saints and served a mission for the church in Vina del Mar, Chile.
