= Lehi High School =

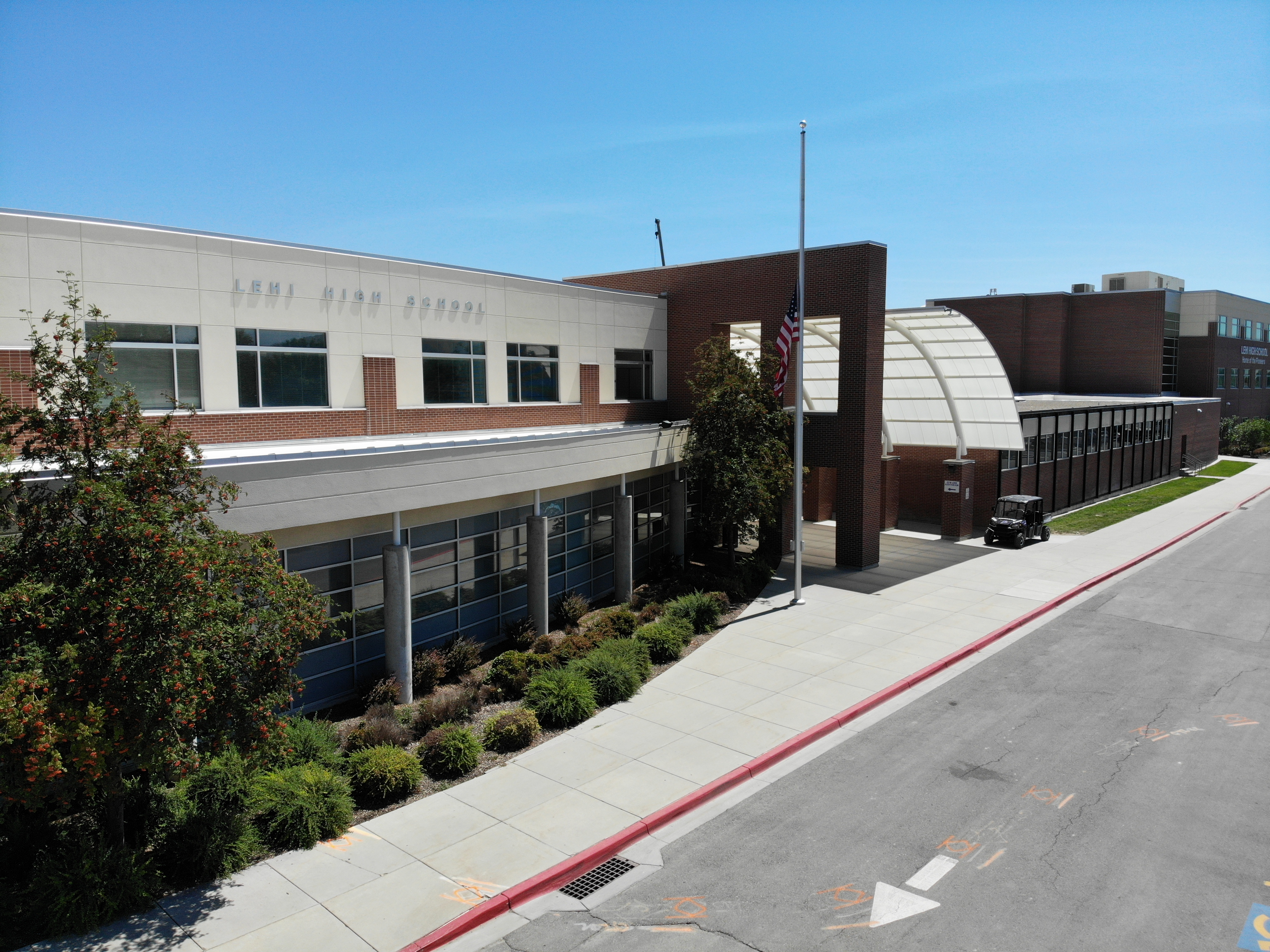

Location
- 180 N 500 E Lehi, Utah 84043; United States; 40°23′24″N 111°50′24″W

Information
- Type: Free public
- Established: 1908
- School district: Alpine School District
- Principal: Aaron Barth
- Teaching staff: 82.52 (on an FTE basis)
- Grades: 10-12
- Student to teacher ratio: 27.17
- Campus type: open
- Colors: Purple; Black; White
- Mascot: Pioneer Pete
- Team name: Pioneers
- Information: Phone: 801-768-7000
- Rivals: Skyridge High School
- Website: http://lhs.alpineschools.org/

Lehi High School is a public high school in Lehi, Utah. The school mascot is the Pioneer, specifically Pioneer Pete, in honor of the city being founded in 1850 by a group of Mormon pioneers. The school has progressed from 3A to 6A in the last five years due to rapid population growth in Lehi, attributed to Silicon Slopes.

== History ==
In the late 1800s, the students met in the attic of the old Central School, but as patrons demanded more structure and formality for their students in the secondary grades, Lehi High School was created in 1908. The mascot was originally the Wolverine, and the school colors were blue and white. When a new grammar school was constructed, Central School became exclusively a high school.

In 1912, the colors were changed from blue and white to purple and white, but it was not until 1925 that the mascot was changed to the Pelicans because newspaper reporters in Salt Lake City felt a wolverine was too violent to be a high school mascot. In 1934–35, the student body voted to change the mascot to a pioneer, an image symbolic of Lehi's pioneer heritage.

In 1921, a new high school was constructed for $92,834 and was subsequently renovated to include an auditorium. Several additions came later including a grandstand, an auto mechanics shop, a choral music/band room, and an office area. Students thrived as new and varied opportunities became available. Junior high and senior high students together attended the two-story high school.

In the early 1950s, it became apparent that new high schools were needed to accommodate the growth in the area. Three high schools were planned for Alpine School District in Pleasant Grove, American Fork, and Lehi. All schools were similar in architecture. The three schools opened in the fall of 1959. Lehi High School has undergone several renovations since its initial opening to accommodate the increase in student population and to meet seismic requirements.

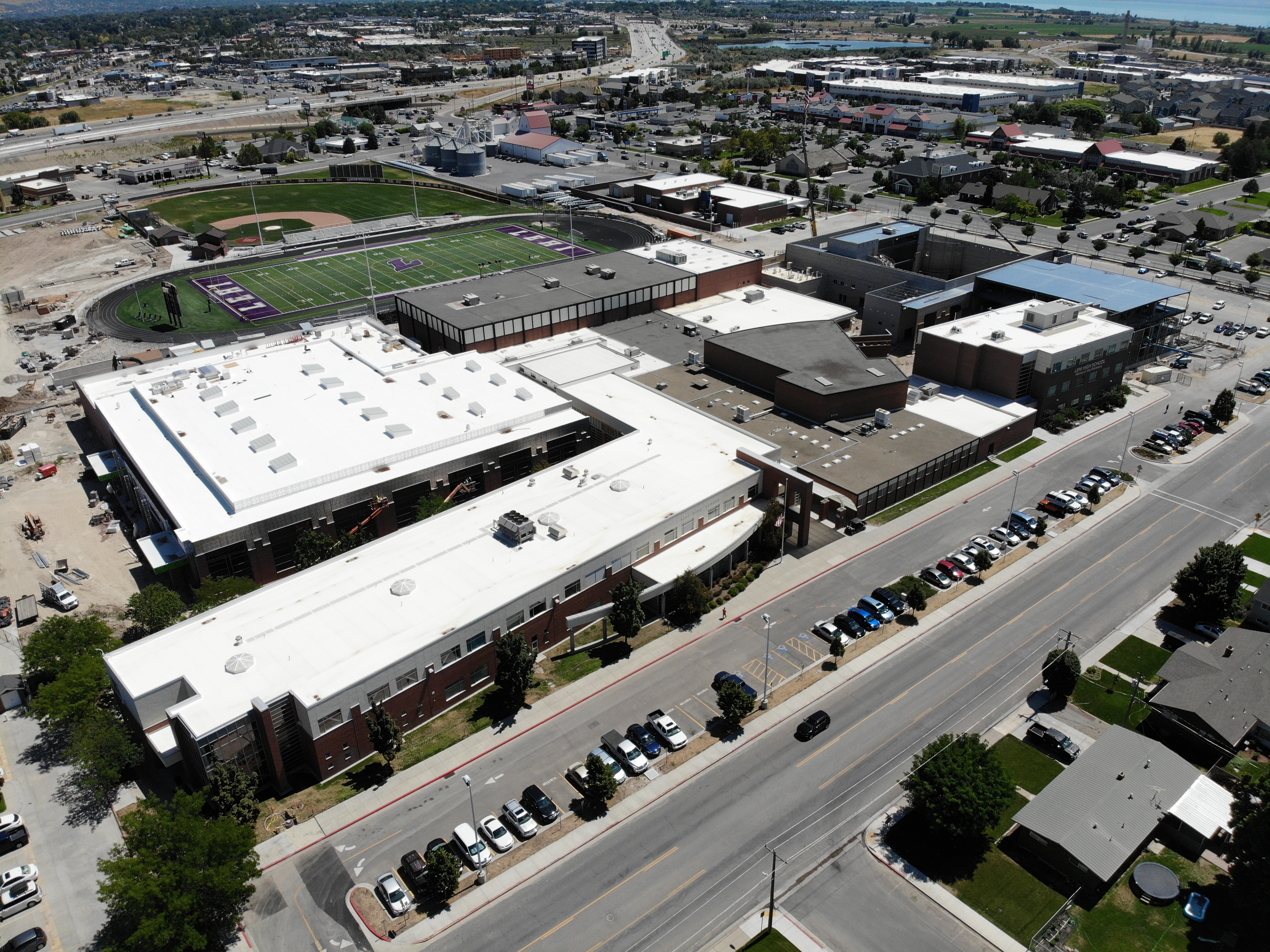
An aerial view of Lehi High School in 2019

In 2009, the school was reduced to 4A with the opening of Westlake High School in Saratoga Springs. In 2011, with growth in the Lehi area, the school again returned to 5A. However, in Fall 2016, a new school was built in Northern Lehi: Skyridge High School. In the later months of 2016, it was announced that beginning the 2017–2018 school year, a 6A classification would be introduced to the UHSAA.

Beginning in 2016, the school began a five year rebuild as a part of a $387 million bond passed by the residents of Alpine School District. The construction was accomplished in phases in order to accommodate the students during the school year. Construction was completed prior to the 2021-2022 school year.

== Academics ==
Lehi High School was ranked in the top-scoring 50 high schools in Utah, based on students' scores in Utah's Criterion Referenced Tests (CRT). The percentage of students who met proficiency standards were as follows: Language Arts 88.28%, Mathematics 67.99%, and Science 58.81%, all above average for the state. The Advanced Placement participation rate at Lehi High is 28% with an 81% passing rate. Lehi High School has a student to teacher ratio of 24:1.

== Athletics ==
Lehi Football won state championships in the following years:

1980 - Lehi was the Class 2A champion, defeating Morgan High School

2000 - Lehi was the Class 3A champion, defeating Delta High School

2017 - Lehi was the Class 5A Champion, defeating Skyridge High School

2021 - Lehi was the Class 5A Champion, defeating Springville High School

2022 - Lehi was the Class 5A Champion, defeating Timpview High School.

== Student body ==
As of 2016, Lehi High School had a total student enrollment of 2,604. 88% of those students were Caucasian, 7% Hispanic, 1% American Indian, 1% Pacific Islander, 1% Black, and 1% Asian. 51% of the student population were male, 49% female. 16% of students came from economically disadvantaged families.

== Notable alumni ==
- Jay Hill, College football defensive coordinator for the Michigan Wolverines football team, former head coach for the Weber State Wildcats football team, and coordinator for the BYU Cougars football team
- Dallin Holker, NFL tight end for the New Orleans Saints
- Isaac Terrell, college football defensive end for the Iowa State Cyclones

== See also ==
- List of high schools in Utah
