= Cameron Sample =

American football player (born 1999)

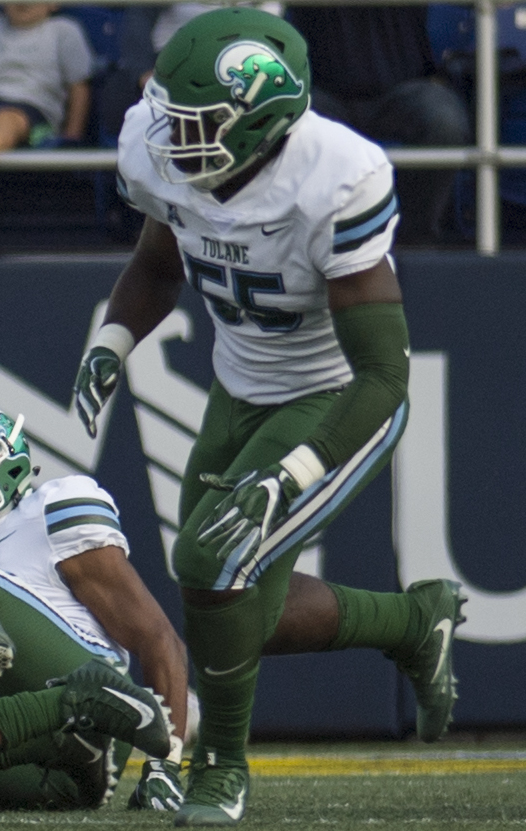
- Sample with the Tulane Green Wave in 2017

Profile
- Position: Defensive end

Personal information
- Born: September 20, 1999 (age 27); Snellville, Georgia, U.S.
- Listed height: 6 ft 3 in (1.91 m)
- Listed weight: 272 lb (123 kg)

Career information
- High school: Shiloh (Snellville)
- College: Tulane (2017–2020)
- NFL draft: 2021: 4th round, 111th overall pick

Career history
- Cincinnati Bengals (2021–2025); San Francisco 49ers (2026)*; Atlanta Falcons (2026)*
- * Offseason or practice squad member only

Awards and highlights
- First-team All-AAC (2020)

Career NFL statistics as of 2025
- Total tackles: 85
- Sacks: 7
- Pass deflections: 1
- Forced fumbles: 1
- Stats at Pro Football Reference

Cameron Sample (born September 20, 1999) is an American professional football defensive end. He played college football for the Tulane Green Wave. He has previously played in the National Football League (NFL) for the Cincinnati Bengals.

== Early life ==
Sample grew up in Snellville, Georgia and attended Shiloh High School. Sample was rated a two-star recruit and signed to play college football at Tulane after having previously committed to play at Georgia Southern.

== College career ==
Sample played in 11 games with three starts as a freshman. Sample started 11 games with four sacks in his sophomore season. He was slowed by nagging injuries as a junior but played in all 13 of Tulane's games with 44 total tackles. Sample finished his senior season with 52 tackles, 7.5 tackles for loss and five sacks and was named first-team All-American Athletic Conference.

== Professional career ==
Pre-draft measurables
Height	Weight	Arm length	Hand span	Wingspan	40-yard dash	10-yard split	20-yard split	20-yard shuttle	Three-cone drill	Vertical jump	Broad jump	Bench press
6 ft 2 3/4 in (1.90 m)	267 lb (121 kg)	33 3/8 in (0.85 m)	9 3/4 in (0.25 m)	6 ft 7 3/8 in (2.02 m)	4.80 s	1.68 s	2.77 s	4.51 s	7.40 s	37.0 in (0.94 m)	9 ft 8 in (2.95 m)	23 reps
All values from Pro Day

=== Cincinnati Bengals ===
Sample was selected by the Cincinnati Bengals in the fourth round, 111th overall, of the 2021 NFL draft. He signed his four-year rookie contract with Cincinnati on May 17.

On August 5, 2024, it was announced that Sample had suffered a torn Achilles tendon, ending his season.

Sample re-signed with the Bengals on March 13, 2025.

=== San Francisco 49ers ===
On April 13, 2026, Sample signed with the San Francisco 49ers on a one-year contract. On August 5, he was waived by the 49ers.

=== Atlanta Falcons ===
On August 10, 2026, Sample signed with the Atlanta Falcons. On August 30, Sample was released Atlanta as a part of final roster cuts; he was subsequently re-signed to the team's practice squad the next day. On September 2, Sample was released by the Falcons.
