= Shiloh High School (Georgia) =

Public high school in Snellville, Georgia, United States

Location
- 4210 Shiloh Rd. Snellville, Gwinnett County, Georgia 30039; United States; 33°49′25″N 84°04′12″W

Information
- Type: Public Secondary
- Motto: To relentlessly pursue high-level learning for all
- Established: 1984
- School district: Gwinnett County Public Schools
- Principal: Cappy Douglass
- Teaching staff: 132.90 (FTE)
- Grades: 9–12
- Enrollment: 2,096 (2024–2025)
- Student to teacher ratio: 15.77
- Colors: Black, silver, and white
- Mascot: General
- Website: Shiloh High School

Shiloh High School is a public high school located in Snellville, Georgia, United States, in southern Gwinnett County. The school is part of the Gwinnett County Public Schools system and opened in 1984. It serves students in the Shiloh Cluster, which feeds from the Anderson Livsey, Annistown, Centerville, Partee, and Shiloh Elementary Schools and Shiloh Middle School.

The school mascot is the General, and the school colors are black, silver, and white.

Shiloh, like Peachtree Ridge, was on block scheduling, and until the 2015-2016 school year, was on a regular six-period day starting 2008-2009, but is now again on a block schedule.

In April 2012, Shiloh High School became an International Baccalaureate World School, expanding Gwinnett County Public Schools’ IB offerings from the Norcross Cluster to both the Norcross and Shiloh clusters. In 2014, Shiloh was approved to offer the IB Career-related Certificate Programme, now known as the IB Career-related Programme.

== Notable alumni ==
- Diana DeGarmo - 2004 American Idol finalist
- Rusty Joiner - actor and model
- Lance Krall - improv comedian and actor
- Kyle Lewis - MLB baseball player
- Josh Okogie - NBA basketball player
- David Pollack - former NFL football player
- Brice Pollock - college football cornerback for the Texas Tech Red Raiders
- Cameron Sample - NFL football player
- Troy Sanders - bassist and vocalist for heavy metal band Mastodon
- John Clarence Stewart - actor and singer
- Stephen Weatherly - NFL football player
