= Seguin High School (Arlington, Texas) =

Juan Seguin High School

Location
- 7001 Silo Road; Arlington, Texas 76002; United States; 32.63202°N 97.10048°W

Information
- Type: Public School
- Motto: Where Excellence is the Standard
- Established: 2002
- School district: Arlington Independent School District
- Principal: Billy Linson
- Teaching staff: 119.77 (FTE)
- Grades: 9–12
- Enrollment: 1,562 (2023–2024)
- Student to teacher ratio: 13.04
- Hours in school day: 7:35-3:00
- Color: Black White Carolina Blue
- Athletics: UIL Class 5A
- Mascot: Cougar
- Newspaper: The Cougar Times
- Yearbook: The Cougar
- Website: www.aisd.net/seguin-high-school/

Juan Seguin High School is a secondary school serving grades 9–12 located in Arlington, Texas and is part of the Arlington Independent School District. The school serves approximately 1,600 students.

== History ==
Juan Seguin High School first opened in August 2002 and received formal dedication in November of that year. The school is classified as a UIL Class 5A school. Because the area has been built-out for some time and no new residential construction is planned, the school is anticipated to remain 5A.

Ed Farmer served as Principal from the opening of Seguin in 2002 until his retirement in January 2011. Michael successor Jan. 20, 2011. On April 4, 2013, Samuel Nix became Seguin's new principal. Nix served as principal of Carter Junior High School prior to his role at Seguin High School.

== Feeder patterns ==
Ashworth, Bebensee, Beckham, Pearcy, and Williams Elementaries feed into Ousley Jr. High. Ousley Jr. High feeds into Seguin.

== Population ==
Juan Seguin High School is the newest of six comprehensive public high schools within the Arlington ISD in the suburban city of Arlington, Texas. Juan Seguin High School has an enrollment of 1,627 students in grades 9–12 with a very diverse population. Juan Seguin High School is fully accredited by Texas Education Agency (TEA). The school year, which consists of 177 days, is divided into two semesters of 18 weeks each. The schedule is A/B Block: classes are 90 minutes and meet every other day. Students take a total of eight classes during a semester. Approximately 70% of Juan Seguin High School graduates enroll in post-secondary education.

== Academics ==
In spring 2010, Juan Seguin High School narrowly missed TEA requirements to be named a Recognized school. The school was 1% low in one sub-population in mathematics. Since then, Seguin has notably improved academic performance every year, working toward the credentials of a premiere school.

Juan Seguin High School's curriculum is varied and extensive. In addition to regular courses, there are special provisions for gifted and talented, ESL, and vocational students, as well as classes for the mentally and physically handicapped students. Advanced Placement courses are offered in AP English Language and Composition, AP English Literature and Composition, Calculus, Biology, Chemistry, American History, American Government, Macroeconomics, Spanish, French, Computer Science, Statistics, Environmental Science, Latin, Human Geography, and Psychology.

Pre-AP courses are offered in English I, English II, Geometry, Algebra II, Biology I, Advanced Biology, World Geography, Chemistry I, Physics, Pre-Calculus, French III, Spanish III, Latin III, Art I and Computer Science.

Seguin has several active academic organizations including NHS, UIL Academics, Academic Decathlon, Journalism, and Environmental Club.

== Athletics ==
Girls Track has their highest finish with a 1st place 5A State Title in 2015. Coach Katra Ridgeway has been the Girls Head Coach since 2002.

== UIL ==
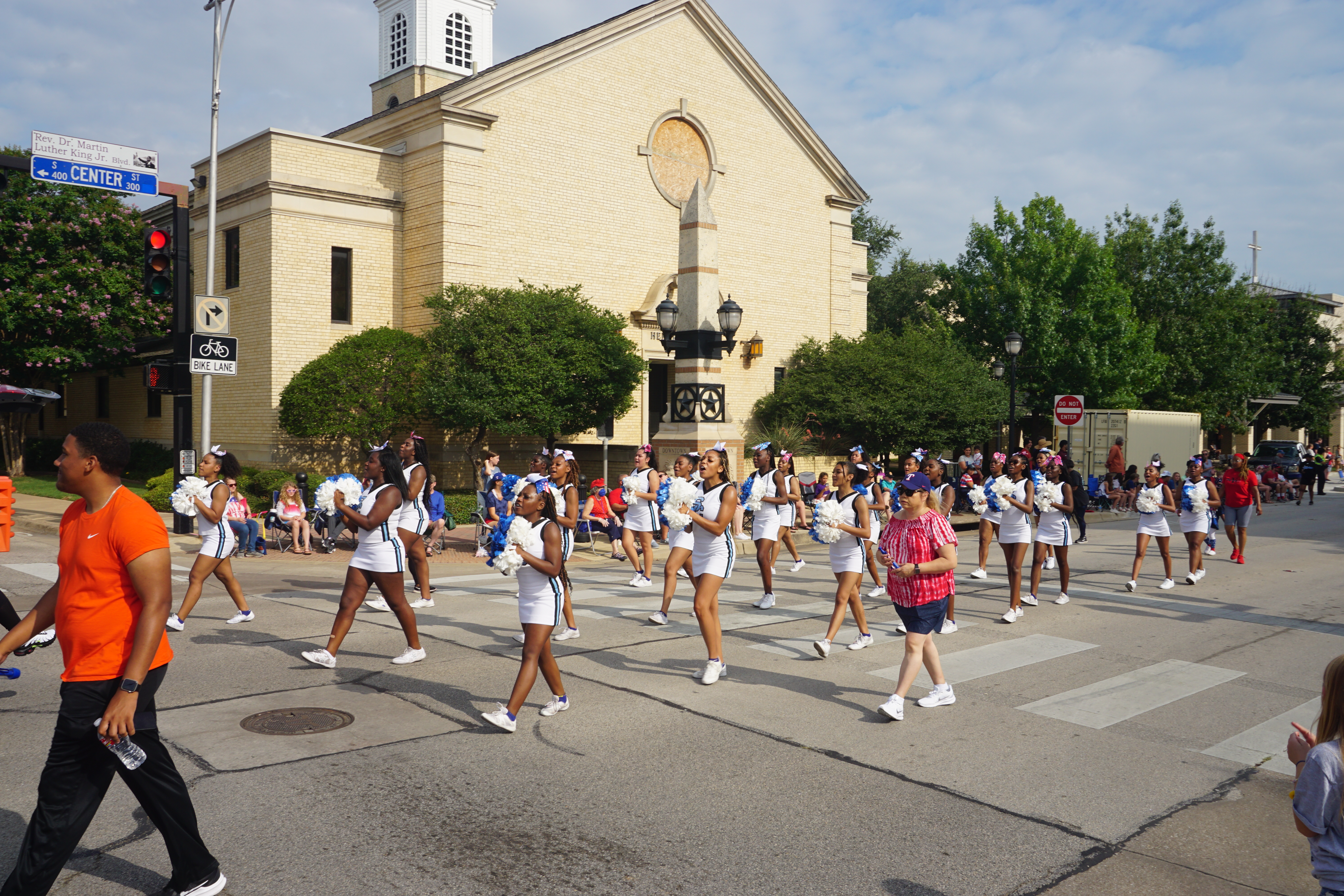
Seguin High School Cheerleaders in the 2021 Arlington Independence Day Parade

Juan Seguin actively participates in UIL Academics, which includes computer science, math, calculators, number sense, accounting, science, social studies, current events, computer applications, speech and debate, poetry/prose, and one-act play.

Other UIL activities at Seguin include: choir, orchestra, band, baseball, basketball, cheerleading, cross country, football, golf, gymnastics, softball, soccer, swimming, tennis, track and field, volleyball, and wrestling.

== Notable alumni ==
- Allison Hightower (Class of 2006) – 2013 WNBA All-Star
- Jamell Fleming (Class of 2007) – Former NFL Defensive Back
- Ciante Evans (Class of 2010) – CFL Player
- Jalen Morton (Class of 2015) – NFL Player
- Tony Santillan (Class of 2015) – MLB Pitcher
- Tonea Marshall (Class of 2016) – Hurdler
- Jamel Johnson (Class of 2023) – College football defensive back for the TCU Horned Frogs
