= Palmer Williams (American football) =

American football player

No. 94 – Baylor Bears
- Position: Punter
- Class: Senior

Personal information
- Listed height: 6 ft 2 in (1.88 m)
- Listed weight: 218 lb (99 kg)

Career information
- High school: Davie County (Mocksville, North Carolina)
- College: Baylor (2023–present)

Awards and highlights
- Big 12 Special Teams Player of the Year (2025); 2× First-team All-Big 12 (2024, 2025)
- Stats at ESPN

Palmer Williams is an American football punter for the Baylor Bears.

== Early life ==
Williams grew up in Advance, North Carolina, and attended Davie County High School in Mocksville, North Carolina. Coming out of high school, he committed to play college football for the Baylor Bears.

== College career ==
Williams won the Bears starting punter job as a freshman in 2023, where he punted 35 times for an average of 42.9 yards per punt, with six landing inside the 20-yard line. In 2024, he punted 43 times for an average of 49.3 yards, as well as a long of 79 yards, earning first-team all-Big 12 honors. During the 2025 season, Williams punted 27 times for an average of 46.9 yards per punt, with 11 landing inside the 20-yard line, and 11 punts of 50 yards or more. For his performance he earned first-team all-Big 12 honors, Big 12 Special Teams Player of the Year honors, and was named a finalist for the Ray Guy Award.
