= Davie County High School =

American public school in North Carolina

Location
- 180 War Eagle Drive; Mocksville, North Carolina 27028; United States; 35°58′17″N 80°32′07″W

Information
- Type: Public
- Established: 1956 (70 years ago)
- School district: Davie County Schools
- CEEB code: 342638
- Principal: Cindy Stone
- Staff: 104.32 (on an FTE basis)
- Grades: 9–12
- Student to teacher ratio: 17.33
- Colors: Orange and Black
- Athletics: NCHSAA 7A
- Athletics conference: North Piedmont 6A/7A
- Mascot: War Eagle
- Website: dchs.godavie.org/o/dchs

Davie County High School (DCHS) is a public high school in Mocksville, North Carolina, United States. Davie County High School is the sole traditional high school in the Davie County School System; it had an enrollment of 1,819 as of the 2024–2025 academic school year.

== History ==
Davie County High School was built in 1956 on the outskirts of downtown Mocksville, the county seat. Initially the school team name was the Rebels, but the school later faced controversy and changed mascots. Davie County High's new team name became the War Eagles.

Since 2000, the county population has expanded 8.2%, and there were ongoing debates that the school might have been too crowded. Two school bond referendums were held, in 2003 and 2007, to provide money for a second new school in the eastern part of the county; however, each of the referendums were rejected by nearly 2-to-1 margins.

In 2014, voters approved the construction of one new high school. The new high school is located on Farmington Road in northeastern Davie County. It was approved by a 53.76% to 46.24% margin.

In 2023, several Davie County High School students, alumni, and faculty were selected as members of the county's winning delegation for the All-America City Award. This included Grayson Haynes, Macey Smith, Journey Bowman, Amber Lynde, Alyse Wooldridge, Anthony Davis, Jinda Haynes, Jennifer Lynde, Ellie Prillaman, Sylas Johnson, Sean Lane, Emma James, Merritt Killian, Brooklyn Lakey, Whitney DeLoach, and Tami Daniel.

== Athletics ==
Davie County High School is a member of the North Carolina High School Athletic Association (NCHSAA) and are currently classified as a 7A school. The school is a part of the North Piedmont 6A/7A Conference. Current ADM: 1,949. Sports at Davie County High School include:

- Baseball
- Basketball
- Cheerleading
- Cross country
- Golf
- Football
- Lacrosse
- Marching band
- Soccer
- Softball
- Swimming
- Tennis
- Track and field
- Volleyball
- Wrestling

=== Football ===
Davie High's 2010 football team were the first football team in the school's history to make it to the North Carolina state championship game. After a 5–6 regular season, they won four straight playoff games, winning the NCHSAA 4A Western Regional championship and advancing to the state finals. They lost to Durham Hillside High School by a score of 40–0 in the 4A championship game, finishing the season with a 9-7 record.

=== Cheerleading ===
Davie High School cheerleaders have won many North Carolina High School Athletic Association invitational championships and cheer competitions. They were North Carolina D1 Medium Varsity champions in 2019, Small Varsity Co-Ed champions in 2011, 2013, 2015, 2017 and 2018, Large Varsity Co-Ed champions in 2009 and 2012, and Carolina Cup champions in 2017 and 2019.

=== Wrestling ===
The Davie County wrestling team won the NCHSAA 4A (North Carolina's former highest classification for high school athletics) dual team state championship in 1994, 2006, and 2024. They won the NCHSAA 4A state tournament team state championship in 1995, 2024, and 2025. They won the NCHSAA 7A dual team state championship in 2026. Coach Buddy Lowery, who was head coach for 43 years from 1976 to 2019, helped lead Davie's wrestling team to 913-136-2 record during his tenure. Lowery was inducted into the Davie County High School and Salisbury-Rowan Halls of Fame, and the North Carolina Chapter of the National Wrestling Hall of Fame.

== Music ==
In April 2016, the DCHS Wind Ensemble, under the direction of Mr. Andrew Jimeson, competed in and won the President's Cup, a national high school band competition hosted by the United States Army Band. Pieces played include "A Slavic Farewell", "Grant Them Eternal Rest", and "Virginia Scenes", the latter of which was written special for the 2016 Presidents Cup by James Kazik.

In November 2017, the Marching Band and Dancing Boots traveled to Chicago and marched in the McDonald's Thanksgiving Day Parade. In 2024, the DCHS Wind Ensemble, now directed by Mr. Matthew Brusseau, was once again invited to compete in the President's Cup. Pieces played for this concert included a James Swearingen arrangement of "Our Director" by F. E. Bigelow, "Aurora Awakes" by John Mackey, and "Red Tails" by Ayatey Shabazz.

In 2025, the DCHS Wind Ensemble, under the direction of Mr. Matthew Brusseau, was invited to perform at the North Carolina Music Educators Association conference, an annual event for music educators in North Carolina, featuring clinics, workshops, and performances. Pieces played for this conference were "Wicklow" by Laura Estes, "Rippling Watercolors" by Brian Balmages, "Canzona" by Peter Mennin, a Donald Hunsburger arrangement of "Galop" by Dmitri Shostakovich, "Bayou Breakdown" by Brant Karrick, and the opening movement of "Symphony No. 1 - A Ghost Story" by Randall D. Standridge. This was the first time in the school's history that an ensemble was invited to perform at the conference.

== Notable alumni ==
- Andrew C. Brock, member of the North Carolina General Assembly
- Ted Budd, businessman and incumbent U.S. Senator (R-NC)
- Caleb Martin, NBA player
- Cody Martin, NBA player
- Whit Merrifield, MLB second baseman and outfielder, 3x All-Star selection
- Chris Reynolds, CFL quarterback, played collegiately at UNC Charlotte
- Carson Whisenhunt, MLB pitcher
- Palmer Williams, college football punter for the Baylor Bears
