= Amare Thomas =

American football player (born 2005)

No. 0 – Houston Cougars
- Position: Wide receiver
- Class: Senior

Personal information
- Born: November 18, 2005 (age 21)
- Listed height: 6 ft 0 in (1.83 m)
- Listed weight: 205 lb (93 kg)

Career information
- High school: Pinson Valley (Pinson, Alabama)
- College: UAB (2023–2024); Houston (2025–present)

Awards and highlights
- First-team All-Big 12 (2025)
- Stats at ESPN

Amare Thomas (born November 18, 2005) is an American college football wide receiver for the Houston Cougars. He previously played for the UAB Blazers.

== Early life ==
Thomas attended Pinson Valley High School in Pinson, Alabama. As a senior, he had 50 receptions for 964 yards and 11 touchdowns. He committed to University of Alabama at Birmingham (UAB) to play college football.

== College career ==
As a true freshman at UAB in 2023, Thomas started four of 12 games and had a school freshman record 53 receptions for 437 yards and three touchdowns. As a sophomore in 2024, he started nine of 12 games and recorded 62 receptions for 670 yards and eight touchdowns. After the season, Thomas entered the transfer portal and transferred to the University of Houston.

He entered his first year at Houston in 2025 as the team's number-one receiver. By all measures, Thomas had a very successful 2025 season in Houston. On October 11, Thomas had 7 catches for a career-high 157 yards at Oklahoma State. On November 1, Thomas caught 10 passes and 3 touchdowns against West Virginia. After finishing second in the Big 12 in receiving yards and receiving touchdowns, Thomas earned Associated Press All-Big 12 first-team honors.

=== Statistics ===
Year	Team	GP	Receiving			
Year	Team	GP	Rec	Yds	Avg	TD
2023	UAB	12	53	437	8.2	3
2024	UAB	12	62	670	10.8	8
2025	Houston	13	67	966	14.4	12
2026	Houston	11	59	853	14.5	10
Career		48	241	2,926	12.1	33
