= LaDainian Fields =

American football player

No. 9 – Oklahoma State Cowboys
- Position: Cornerback
- Class: Redshirt Sophomore

Personal information
- Listed height: 6 ft 1 in (1.85 m)
- Listed weight: 176 lb (80 kg)

Career information
- High school: Del City (Del City, Oklahoma)
- College: Oklahoma State (2025–present)
- Stats at ESPN

LaDainian Fields is an American football cornerback for the Oklahoma State Cowboys.

== Early life ==
Fields attended Del City High School in Del City, Oklahoma. He committed to play college football for the TCU Horned Frogs. However, on National Signing Day, Fields flipped his commitment to play for the Oklahoma State Cowboys.

== College career ==
As a freshman during the 2024 season, Fields was redshirted. In week 6 of the 2025 season, he intercepted a pass which he returned 55 yards for a touchdown in a loss to Arizona. He finished the 2025 season with 16 tackles, a pass deflection, and two interceptions.
