= Wayshawn Parker =

American football player

No. 1 – Utah Utes
- Position: Running back
- Class: Junior

Personal information
- Listed height: 5 ft 10 in (1.78 m)
- Listed weight: 205 lb (93 kg)

Career information
- High school: Grant Union (Sacramento, California)
- College: Washington State (2024); Utah (2025–present)

Awards and highlights
- Pac-12 Freshman Top Performer (2024); Third-team All-Big 12 (2025)
- Stats at ESPN

Wayshawn Parker is an American college football running back for the Utah Utes. He previously played for the Washington State Cougars.

== Early life ==
Hailing from Sacramento, California, Parker initially attended Rosemont High School, where he played fullback and linebacker for two seasons. He transferred to Elk Grove High School in Elk Grove, California, after his family moved to the area, and rushed for 807 yards and 13 touchdowns on 53 carries as a junior. Parker transferred once again to Grant Union High School in Sacramento, where he rushed for 1,907 yards and 24 touchdowns as a senior. He was rated as a three-star recruit and committed to play college football for the Washington State Cougars.

== College career ==
=== Washington State ===
In week two of the 2024 season, Parker rushed 11 times for 69 yards and a touchdown in a win over Texas Tech. During the 2024 season, he rushed for 735 yards and four touchdowns on 137 carries, while also hauling in eleven receptions for 108 yards and a touchdown. After the conclusion of the 2024 season, Parker entered his name into the NCAA transfer portal.

=== Utah ===
On December 20, 2024, Parker announced that he would transfer to Utah.

== Personal life ==
Parker is related to rapper OMB Peezy.
