= Michael Baiamonte =

American basketball announcer

Michael Baiamonte is an American professional basketball announcer. He was the public address voice of the National Basketball Association's Miami Heat from 1990 until his retirement in 2026.

== Career ==
Baiamonte joined the Miami Heat as its PA announcer the year after the team's inauguration. The Miami media has praised his unique style and creativity, referring to him as "one of the most recognizable voices in the South Florida sports market". Baiamonte has also received recognition from national media outlets, such as USA Today, who referred to his "Good Mourning!" call for an Alonzo Mourning dunk as "the best call by a public address announcer".

His style includes stretching long vowels for trademark phrases. An example is the game introduction of "Aaand now... staaand up... and make some noooise... for your... Miamiii... Heeeeat!" Some of Baiamonte's other signature calls include "Toooo many steps!" for traveling, and at two minutes left in a quarter, "Twooo minutes... ¡Dos!"

On May 10, 2012, Baiamonte raised minor controversy for a call he made during a playoff game against the New York Knicks. In Game 2 of the series, Knicks forward Amar'e Stoudemire injured his left hand when he punched a fire extinguisher case. In Game 5, Baiamonte announced that Stoudemire had been "extinguished" when he was disqualified with his sixth foul. The Miami Heat and Baiamonte later apologized publicly to Stoudemire and the Knicks for the inappropriate choice of words.

Baiamonte has hosted several events for various organizations and corporations as an emcee, including Top Rank Boxing, Ritz-Carlton, Hilton Hotels, Nike, and Miami-Dade County Public Schools.

== Personal life ==
Baiamonte and his wife, Natalie, have three daughters and live in Miami, Florida.
