= Ethan Wesloski =

American football player (born 2003)

No. 32 – Oklahoma State Cowboys
- Position: Linebacker
- Class: Redshirt Senior

Personal information
- Born: July 22, 2003 (age 23)
- Listed height: 6 ft 1 in (1.85 m)
- Listed weight: 234 lb (106 kg)

Career information
- High school: McKinney Boyd (McKinney, Texas)
- College: North Texas (2022–2025); Oklahoma State (2026–present)

Awards and highlights
- Second-team All-American Conference (2025)
- Stats at ESPN

Ethan Wesloski (born July 22, 2003) is an American college football linebacker for the Oklahoma State Cowboys. He previously played for the North Texas Mean Green.

== Early life ==
Wesloski attended McKinney Boyd High School in McKinney, Texas. As a junior in 2020, he recorded 140 tackles, including 12 tackles for loss and four sacks, to go with two forced fumbles and two interceptions. He was named the District 5-6A co-Defensive Player of the Year, and earned Class 6A all-state honorable mention by the Texas Sports Writers Association (TSWA). As a senior, Wesloski recorded 131 tackles, 34 tackles for loss, 18 sacks, 12 forced fumbles, two fumble recoveries, and two interceptions. (Note: His senior season stats were alternatively reported as 131 tackles, 36 tackles for loss, 11 sacks, eight forced fumbles, and two interceptions.) He garnered first-team all-Dallas area and all-District 5-6A honors, and was a second-team Class 6A all-state selection by the TSWA.

Wesloski also played baseball at Boyd as a catcher. According to the Denton Record-Chronicle, he "might have been a better prospect" in baseball, drawing the attention of both college and pro scouts. As a junior, Wesloski suffered a torn labrum, which made it painful to perform pickoff attempts on baserunners, and slowed down his baseball recruitment as a result. He was ultimately ranked the 59th-best catcher recruit nationally in the class of 2022 by Perfect Game USA.

Wesloski was rated as a three-star recruit by ESPN and 247Sports, and a two-star recruit by Rivals.com. He committed to playing college football at the University of North Texas over offers from Air Force, Navy, and Texas Southern, and signed with the Mean Green during the early signing period in December 2021.

== College career ==
As a freshman in 2022, Wesloski appeared in two games and was redshirted. He was named a starter at linebacker ahead of the 2023 season opener, posting seven tackles, including two for loss, in a defeat to California. Wesloski recorded his first career sack the following week in a loss to FIU. He played in all 12 games, starting 11, and finished the season with 63 tackles, 7.5 tackles for loss, three sacks, and one forced fumble. In 2024, Wesloski tallied 57 tackles, five tackles for loss, and 2.5 sacks in 13 games. He started the first 10 games of the season before he was pulled from the starting lineup.

Wesloski entered the 2025 season as the starting Sam linebacker. He scored his first career touchdown in the season opener, forcing a fumble and recovering it in the end zone during a 51–0 win over Lamar. Wesloski recorded his first career interception the following month, picking off a pass thrown by Bishop Davenport in a 36–22 win over South Alabama. On November 22, he posted a career-high 17 tackles in a 56–24 win over Rice. Wesloski led the team with 113 tackles, including nine tackles for loss and 1.5 sacks, to go with along with two forced fumbles, a fumble recovery, and an interception in 14 games (with eight starts). North Texas compiled a 12–2 record, breaking the program record for wins, and achieved its first AP poll ranking since 1959. Wesloski earned second-team All-American Conference honors. After the season, he announced his intention to enter the NCAA transfer portal following the departure of his head coach. Wesloski was rated as a three-star transfer recruit by both On3.com and 247Sports. On January 6, 2026, he announced that he would be transferring to Oklahoma State University to follow his head coach, Eric Morris, who had been hired there for the forthcoming season.

Wesloski joined the Cowboys for the team's spring practices. He entered the 2026 season as the starting Sam linebacker.

== Personal life ==
Ethan Wesloski is the son of John and Laurie Wesloski. His father played college football as a defensive back at Florida and was a teammate of Emmitt Smith. His younger brother, Nick, plays college baseball as a pitcher at Oklahoma, helping them win the 2026 College World Series.
