= Wendell Gregory =

American football player (born 2006)

No. 1 – Kansas State Wildcats
- Position: Defensive end
- Class: Redshirt Sophomore

Personal information
- Born: January 27, 2006 (age 20)
- Listed height: 6 ft 3 in (1.91 m)
- Listed weight: 255 lb (116 kg)

Career information
- High school: Walton (Marietta, Georgia)
- College: South Carolina (2024); Oklahoma State (2025); Kansas State (2026–present)

Awards and highlights
- Big 12 Defensive Freshman of the Year (2025); Third-team All-Big 12 (2025)
- Stats at ESPN

Wendell J. Gregory (born January 27, 2006) is an American college football defensive end for the Kansas State Wildcats. He previously played for the South Carolina Gamecocks and Oklahoma State Cowboys.

== Early life ==
Gregory is from Marietta, Georgia. He attended George Walton Comprehensive High School in Marietta where he played football, initially as a wide receiver before moving to linebacker as a sophomore. Across his sophomore and junior seasons, he tallied 86 tackles, 11 tackles-for-loss (TFLs), 5.5 sacks and two interceptions. He then had 56 tackles, 18 TFLs and seven sacks as a senior in 2023, helping Walton to a record of 14–1 with an appearance in the 7A state championship. A four-star recruit, Gregory was ranked by 247Sports as the 12th-best linebacker prospect and the 130th-best player nationally in the recruiting class of 2024. He committed to play college football for the South Carolina Gamecocks.

== College career ==
As a true freshman at South Carolina in 2024, Gregory appeared in two games and redshirted, posting a tackle, while playing as a defensive end. He entered the NCAA transfer portal after the season and transferred to the Oklahoma State Cowboys. He became a starter for the Cowboys in 2025. Through nine games, he was the leader among FBS freshmen with 10.5 tackles-for-loss. He was named a semifinalist for the Shaun Alexander Freshman of the Year award.
