= A. J. Holmes Jr. =

American football player (born 2003)

No. 10 – Texas Tech Red Raiders
- Position: Defensive tackle
- Class: Redshirt Senior

Personal information
- Born: November 7, 2003 (age 23)
- Listed height: 6 ft 3 in (1.91 m)
- Listed weight: 300 lb (136 kg)

Career information
- High school: Westfield (Houston, Texas)
- College: Houston (2022–2024); Texas Tech (2025–present)

Awards and highlights
- First-team All-American (2025); Second-team All-Big 12 (2025)
- Stats at ESPN

Anthony "A. J." Holmes Jr. (born November 7, 2003) is an American college football defensive tackle for the Texas Tech Red Raiders. He previously played for the Houston Cougars.

== Early life ==
Holmes Jr. attended Westfield High School in Houston, Texas. As a senior season, he was named the District 14-6A MVP. Coming out of high school, Holmes Jr. committed to play college football for the Houston Cougars over other offers from schools such as TCU, Kansas State, Washington State, SMU, and Virginia.

== College career ==
=== Houston ===
During his freshman season in 2022, Holmes Jr. notched six tackles with half a tackle being for a loss. In the 2023 season, he appeared in 12 games with three starts, where he totaled 21 tackles with four and a half going for a loss, and two and a half sacks. During the 2024 season, Holmes Jr. tallied 40 tackles with eight and a half being for a loss, and two sacks. After the season, he entered his name into the NCAA transfer portal.

=== Texas Tech ===
Holmes Jr. transferred to play for the Texas Tech Red Raiders. In week 2 of the 2025 season, he notched four tackles with two being for a loss, a sack, a pass deflection, and a fumble recovery in a blowout win over Kent State. In week 6, Holmes Jr. recorded two sacks in a win versus Kansas. In week 7, he recorded a sack against Arizona State. For his performance during the 2025 season, Holmes Jr. was named a first-team All-American by Pro Football Focus.
