= Jamel Johnson (defensive back) =

American football player (born 2003)

No. 2 – TCU Horned Frogs
- Position: Safety
- Class: Senior

Personal information
- Born: October 21, 2003 (age 23)
- Listed height: 6 ft 1 in (1.85 m)
- Listed weight: 205 lb (93 kg)

Career information
- High school: Seguin (Arlington, Texas)
- College: TCU (2023–present)

Awards and highlights
- Second-team All-Big 12 (2025)
- Stats at ESPN

Jamel Johnson (born October 21, 2003) is an American football defensive back for the TCU Horned Frogs.

== Early life ==
Johnson attended high school at Seguin located in Arlington, Texas. Coming out of high school, he was rated as a four-star recruit, the 33rd overall safety, and the 357th overall prospect in the class of 2023, where he committed to play college football for the TCU Horned Frogs over other offers from schools such as Arkansas, Florida State, and Ole Miss.

== College career ==
During his freshman season in 2023, he logged 19 tackles with one being for a loss. In week one of the 2024 season, Johnson totaled 11 tackles in his first career start, in a victory over Stanford. In week three he tallied 11 tackles against UCF. Johnson finished the 2024 season, totaling 73 tackles, three pass deflections, and a forced fumble. After the conclusion of the 2024 season, Johnson decided to enter his name into the NCAA transfer portal, but would later return to the Horned Frogs. In week four of the 2025 season, he hauled in two interceptions in a victory versus SMU, where for his performance he was named the Big-12 Defensive Player of the Week. For his performance during the 2025 season, Johnson was named a semifinalist for the 2025 Jim Thorpe Award.
