= Ben Roberts (linebacker) =

American football player (born 2004)

No. 13 – Texas Tech Red Raiders
- Position: Linebacker
- Class: Redshirt Senior

Personal information
- Born: February 28, 2004 (age 22)
- Listed height: 6 ft 3 in (1.91 m)
- Listed weight: 245 lb (111 kg)

Career information
- High school: V.R. Eaton (Fort Worth, Texas)
- College: Texas Tech (2022–present)

Awards and highlights
- Big 12 Defensive Freshman of the Year (2023); Second-team All-Big 12 (2023); Third-team All-Big 12 (2025)
- Stats at ESPN

Ben Roberts (born February 28, 2004) is an American football linebacker for the Texas Tech Red Raiders.

== Early life ==
Roberts attended V.R. Eaton High School. He committed to play college football for the Texas Tech Red Raiders.

== College career ==
Roberts used the 2022 season to redshirt. In week two of the 2023 season, Roberts made his first career start, where he notched 12 tackles with two being for a loss, half a sack, and a forced fumble in a loss versus Oregon. He finished the 2023 season, recording a team-high 107 tackles with six and a half being for a loss, half a sack, an interception, and two forced fumbles. For his performance during the 2023 season, Roberts was named to the FWAA freshman all-American team, while also being named the Big 12 Defensive Freshman of the Year. He finished the 2024 season, notching 83 tackles with four and a half going for a loss. In week eleven of the 2025 season, Roberts brought in an interception in a victory versus Kansas State.

Teaming up at linebacker with Big XII defensive Most Valuable Player Jacob Rodriguez, Roberts led the Red Raiders to a 34–7 win over BYU in the conference championship game on Dec. 6 at Cowboys Stadium. Roberts tallied two interceptions in the second half and was named the game’s MVP.

=== College statistics ===
Legend
**Bold**	Career high

Season	Team	GP	Solo	Ast	Tot	Loss	Sk	Pd	FF	FR	TD
2022	Texas Tech	2	0	0	0	0.0	0.0	0	0	0	0
2023	Texas Tech	**13**	**55**	**52**	**107**	**6.5**	0.5	0	0	0	0
2024	Texas Tech	**13**	38	45	83	4.5	0.0	0	0	0	0
2025	Texas Tech	12	34	35	69	3.0	0.0	**5**	0	0	0
Total		40	127	132	259	14.0	0.5	5	0	0	0
