= Faletau Satuala =

American football player

No. 11 – BYU Cougars
- Position: Safety
- Class: Junior

Personal information
- Listed height: 6 ft 4 in (1.93 m)
- Listed weight: 215 lb (98 kg)

Career information
- High school: Bountiful (Bountiful, Utah)
- College: BYU (2024–present)

Awards and highlights
- Third-team All-Big 12 (2025)
- Stats at ESPN

Faletau Satuala is an American college football safety for the BYU Cougars.

== Early life ==
Satuala attended Bountiful High School in Bountiful, Utah. As a senior, he totaled 86 tackles and six interceptions. A four-star recruit, Satuala committed to play college football at Brigham Young University over offers from Utah and UCLA.

== College career ==
Satuala earned immediate playing time as a true freshman. He finished the 2024 season recording nine tackles and an interception. Satuala's playing time increased his sophomore season, totaling five tackles and an interception against Stanford. Against Iowa State, he returned an interception 40 yards for a game sealing touchdown en route to a 41–27 victory. As a result of his performance, Satuala was named the Co-Big 12 Defender of the Week.
