= Trey Lathan =

American football player

No. 4 – Kansas Jayhawks
- Position: Linebacker
- Class: (redshirt) Senior

Personal information
- Listed height: 6 ft 1 in (1.85 m)
- Listed weight: 224 lb (102 kg)

Career information
- High school: Gulliver Preparatory School (Kendall, Florida)
- College: West Virginia (2022–2024); Kansas (2025–present)
- Stats at ESPN

Trey Lathan is an American football linebacker for the Kansas Jayhawks. He previously played for the West Virginia Mountaineers.

== Early life ==
Lathan grew up in Goulds, Florida, and attended Gulliver Preparatory School in Kendall, Florida. He was rated as a four-star recruit by 247Sports, and committed to play college football for the West Virginia Mountaineers over offers from other schools such as Florida, Miami, LSU, and Penn State.

== College career ==
=== West Virginia ===
As a freshman in 2022, Lathan was redshirted, playing in four games and making six tackles. In 2023, he posted 27 tackles with one going for a loss, two pass deflections, and a forced fumble, before he broke his leg. In 2024, Lathan recorded 79 tackles with nine going for a loss, two sacks, and a forced fumble. After the conclusion of the season, he entered the NCAA transfer portal.

=== Kansas ===
Lathan transferred to play for the Kansas Jayhawks. In week 4 of the 2025 season, he recorded three tackles, a sack, and his first career interception in a victory over his former team, West Virginia. Lathan finished the 2025 season with 86 tackles with seven going for a loss, a sack and a half, and an interception. After the conclusion of the season, he once again entered the NCAA transfer portal. However, after two weeks in the portal, Lathan announced that he was returning to the Jayhawks for the 2026 season.
