= Isaac Terrell =

American football player

No. 88 – Iowa State Cyclones
- Position: Defensive end
- Class: Senior

Personal information
- Listed height: 6 ft 2 in (1.88 m)
- Listed weight: 255 lb (116 kg)

Career information
- High school: Lehi (Lehi, Utah)
- College: Washington State (2023–2025); Iowa State (2026–present)
- Stats at ESPN

Isaac Terrell is an American football defensive end for the Iowa State Cyclones. He previously played for the Washington State Cougars.

== Early life ==
Terrell attended Lehi High School in Lehi, Utah. He was rated as a three-star recruit by 247Sports and committed to play college football for the Washington State Cougars over offers from California, San Jose State, and Utah State.

== College career ==
In his first two seasons in 2023 and 2024, Terrell notched 12 tackles with one for loss in 21 games played. In week 7 of the 2025 season, he recorded five tackles with four for loss, two sacks, and a forced fumble in a loss to Ole Miss. Terrell appeared in 12 games with 6 starts on the season, totaling 28 tackles with 12 for loss, seven sacks, a pass deflection, and a forced fumble. After the season, he entered the NCAA transfer portal.

Terrell transferred to play for the Iowa State Cyclones. In the 2026 season opener, he notched three tackles with all three for a loss, and three sacks in a win over Southeast Missouri State.
