= Brice Pollock =

American football player (born 2005)

No. 14 – Texas Tech Red Raiders
- Position: Cornerback
- Class: Senior

Personal information
- Born: March 28, 2005 (age 21)
- Listed height: 6 ft 0 in (1.83 m)
- Listed weight: 195 lb (88 kg)

Career information
- High school: Shiloh (Snellville, Georgia)
- College: Mississippi State (2023–2024); Texas Tech (2025–present)

Awards and highlights
- First-team All-Big 12 (2025)
- Stats at ESPN

Brice Gabriel Pollock (born March 28, 2005) is an American college football cornerback for the Texas Tech Red Raiders. He previously played for the Mississippi State Bulldogs.

== Early life ==
Pollock attended Shiloh High School in Snellville, Georgia. As a senior, he had 61 tackles, two interceptions with a sack and caught 11 passes for 196 yards with four receiving touchdowns. He committed to Mississippi State University to play college football.

== College career ==
As a freshman at Mississippi State in 2023, Pollock started three of 11 games and recorded 24 tackles. As a junior in 2024, he started all 12 games and had 48 tackles and one interception. After the season, Pollock entered the transfer portal and transferred to Texas Tech University. He was a starter in 2025.
