= Evan Tengesdahl =

American football player (born 2005)

No. 50 – Cincinnati Bearcats
- Position: Guard
- Class: Redshirt Junior

Personal information
- Born: February 9, 2005 (age 21)
- Listed height: 6 ft 3 in (1.91 m)
- Listed weight: 323 lb (147 kg)

Career information
- High school: Wayne (OH); Huber Heights, Ohio
- College: Cincinnati (2023–present)
- Stats at ESPN

Evan Tengesdahl (born February 9, 2005) is an American college football guard for the Cincinnati Bearcats.

== Early life ==
Tengesdahl attended Wayne High School. At Wayne, he played football and was a consensus three-star recruit. In December 2021, he committed to Cincinnati.

== College career ==
Tengesdahl redshirted his true freshman season, gaining experience on the scout team. In his second year, he appeared in 11 games as a reserve offensive lineman. Ahead of the 2025 season, Tengesdahl earned the starting left guard position, starting all 13 games and allowing zero sacks and only two QB hits all season. His performance contributed to a Bearcats offensive line that allowed just eight sacks, ranking second-fewest nationally. Following the season, Tengesdahl earned AP Third-Team All-America honors. Entering the 2026 season, he earned preseason All-Big 12 honors.

== Personal life ==
Tengesdahl is the son of Coretta and Granville Tengesdahl. His brother Paxton plays football at Indianapolis.
