= Bruce Mitchell (American football) =

American football player

No. 63 – BYU Cougars
- Position: Center
- Class: Redshirt Junior

Personal information
- Listed height: 6 ft 4 in (1.93 m)
- Listed weight: 305 lb (138 kg)

Career information
- High school: South Summit (Kamas, Utah)
- College: BYU (2022–present)

Awards and highlights
- First-team All-Big 12 (2025)
- Stats at ESPN

Bruce Mitchell is an American football center for the BYU Cougars.

== Early life ==
Mitchell attended South Summit High School located in Kamas, Utah. Coming out of high school, he committed to play college football for the BYU Cougars.

== College career ==
During his first two seasons from 2022 through 2023 Mitchell played as a defensive lineman in 11 total games, where he notched nine tackles with one a half being for a loss, and a pass deflection, while also utilizing a redshirt. He was named to the all-Big 12 academic team. Heading into the 2024 season, he was converted to an offensive lineman. In week 4 of the 2024 season, Mitchell made his first collegiate start at offensive guard in a victory versus Kansas State. In week 7, Mitchell made his first career start at center in a victory over Arizona, where he finished the game as the team's highest rated lineman. He finished the 2024 season, starting in six games due to injuries among the BYU offensive line. Mitchell entered the 2025 season as the Cougars starting center.
