= 2026 BYU Cougars football team =

American college football season

2026 BYU Cougars football
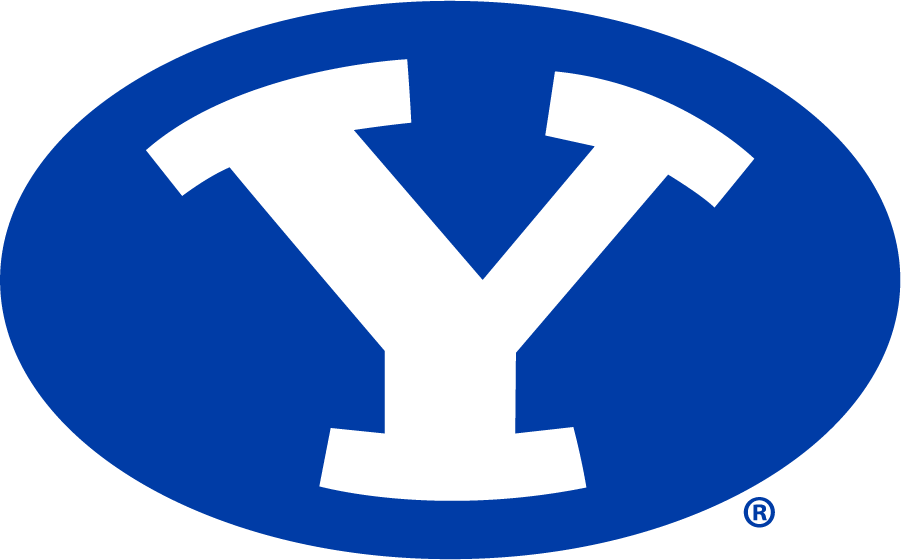
- Conference: Big 12 Conference

Ranking
- Coaches: No. 11
- AP: No. 11
- CFP: No. 10
- Record: 9–2 (6–2 Big 12)
- Head coach: Kalani Sitake (11th season)
- Offensive coordinator: Aaron Roderick (6th season)
- Offensive scheme: Power spread
- Defensive coordinator: Kelly Poppinga (1st season)
- Base defense: Multiple 4–3
- Home stadium: LaVell Edwards Stadium

Uniform

2026 Big 12 Conference football standings
	Conf.			Overall
Team	W		L	W		L
No. 2 Utah y	8	–	0	11	–	0
No. 12 Texas Tech	7	–	1	10	–	1
No. 10 BYU	6	–	2	9	–	2
No. 19 Arizona	5	–	3	8	–	3
No. 20 Houston	5	–	3	8	–	3
Oklahoma State	5	–	3	7	–	4
Baylor	4	–	4	6	–	5
Arizona State	4	–	4	6	–	5
UCF	4	–	4	6	–	5
Iowa State	3	–	5	5	–	6
TCU	3	–	5	5	–	6
Cincinnati	3	–	5	6	–	5
Kansas	2	–	6	4	–	7
West Virginia	2	–	6	5	–	6
Colorado	2	–	6	4	–	7
Kansas State	1	–	7	4	–	7
Championship: TBD vs. Utah
^ – College Football Playoff participant; $ – Conference champion; y – Championship game participant; As of November 22, 2026; Rankings from CFP rankings

The 2026 BYU Cougars football team represents Brigham Young University (BYU) as a member of the Big 12 Conference during the 2026 NCAA Division I FBS football season. The Cougars are led by 11th-year head coach Kalani Sitake and play their home games at LaVell Edwards Stadium.

== Offseason ==
=== Coaching changes ===
On January 2, 2026, it was announced that defensive coordinator and safeties coach Jay Hill would depart to take the same position at the University of Michigan. The next day, defensive pass game coordinator and longtime cornerbacks coach Jernaro Gilford would follow Hill to help coach the Wolverines. On January 8, 2026, defensive ends coach and special teams coordinator Kelly Poppinga was promoted to be the new defensive coordinator, while defensive tackles coach Sione Po'uha was promoted to associate head coach, replacing Hill in that role. Demario Warren was also hired from Boise State as the new defensive pass game coordinator, and initially also as cornerbacks coach to replace Gilford. However, nearly a month later, Lewis Walker was hired away from North Dakota State to coach the cornerbacks, while Warren was assigned to oversee the safeties. That same day, BYU announced the promotions of Justin Ena to special teams coordinator, and senior defensive analyst Chad Kuaha'aha'a to outside linebackers coach. Poppinga and Po'uha's positional coaching roles were also further defined and adjusted, with Po'uha now overseeing the entire defensive line and Poppinga moving to coach the inside linebackers.

=== 2026 recruits ===
Name	Pos.	Height	Weight	Hometown	Notes
Brock Harris	TE	6'6"	238	St. George, Utah	Mission prior to enrolling
Adam Bywater	LB	6'3"	210	Holladay, Utah	Mission prior to enrolling
TJ Johnson	DB	6'4"	180	Fort Worth, Texas	
Jax Tanner	OL	6'4"	275	Meridian, Idaho	Mission prior to enrolling
Graham Livingston	WR	5'11"	180	Providence, Utah	Mission prior to enrolling
Kaue Akana	DB	6'3"	200	Orem, Utah	Mission prior to enrolling
Bott Mulitalo	OL	6'5"	290	American Fork, Utah	
Justice Brathwaite	DB	6'1"	190	Gilbert, Arizona	
Nehemiah Kolone	DL	6'4"	265	Stillwater, Oklahoma	
Devaughn Eka	RB	5'11"	190	Lehi, Utah	
Braxton Lindsey	DL	6'3"	230	Rogers, Arkansas	
Matthew Mason	DB	6'3"	190	Las Vegas, Nevada	
Sefanaia Alatini	DB	6'2"	199	Mountain View, California	Mission prior to enrolling
Legend Glasker	WR	6'2"	175	Lehi, Utah	
Parker Ord	TE	6'4"	215	Frisco, Texas	Mission prior to enrolling
Ty Goettsche	TE	6'6"	225	Englewood, Colorado	Mission prior to enrolling
Lopeti Moala	DL	6'4"	255	Orem, Utah	Mission prior to enrolling
Terrance Saryon	WR	5'11"	175	Portland, Oregon	
Ryder Lyons	QB	6'3"	225	Folsom, California	Mission prior to enrolling
Jaron Pula	WR	6'3"	195	Highland, Utah	
Kennan Pula	DB	6'3"	195	Highland, Utah	
Gage Tanner	LB	6'1"	225	Meridian, Idaho	
Cole Shulman	P	6'0"	175	Nashville, Tennessee	
Journee Tonga	RB	5'8"	198	Lawndale, California	

=== 2026 returned missionaries ===
Enoch Watson	QB	6'3"	202	Freshman
Jett Nelson	WR	6'5"	210	Freshman
Matthew Fredrick	TE	6'5"	230	Freshman
David Tangilanu	DL	6'5"	255	Freshman
Owen Borg	LB	6'2"	200	Freshman
Blake Lowe	LB	6'3"	205	Freshman
Talitu'i Pututau	OL	6'5"	260	Freshman
Adney Reid	DL	6'5"	225	Freshman
Micah Beckstead	RB	5'11"	210	Freshman
Josh Davis	TE	6'4"	225	Freshman
Owen Geilman	QB	6'4"	225	Freshman
Lance Reynolds	DB	6'2"	190	Freshman
Brody Laga	K	5'11"	170	Freshman
Jake Alexander	OL	6'6"	270	Freshman
Devoux Tuataga	DL	6'6"	265	Freshman
Asher Young	WR	6'3"	205	Freshman

=== 2026 other additions ===
Name	Pos.	Height	Weight	Year	Previous school
Kyler Kasper	WR	6'6"	210	Junior	Transfer from University of Oregon
Walker Lyons	TE	6'4"	245	Junior	Transfer from University of Southern California
Zak Yamauchi	OL	6'4"	325	Sophomore	Transfer from Stanford University
Paki Finau	OL	6'5"	319	Sophomore	Transfer from University of Washington
Jr Sia	OL	6'5"	325	Junior	Transfer from Utah State University
Cade Uluave	LB	6'1"	235	Senior	Transfer from University of California, Berkeley
Jake Clifton	LB	6'2"	222	Junior	Transfer from Kansas State University
Jayven Williams	DB	6'2"	185	Senior	Transfer from Mississippi State University
Roger Saleapaga	TE	6'4"	245	Junior	Transfer from University of Oregon
Seth Shigg	DB	5'10"	182	Freshman	Transfer from Army University
Daniel Taumoepeau	LB	6'0"	220	Sophomore	Transfer from Eastern Washington University
Rayden Heintz	LS	6'0"	210	Sophomore	Transfer from Snow College
John Sanders	QB	6'0"	190	Sophomore	Transfer from Antelope Valley College
Fisher Ingersoll	WR	6'2"	195	Senior	Transfer from Texas Christian University

=== 2026 departures ===
Name	Pos.	Height	Weight	Year	Reason
Talan Alfrey	DB	6'2"	205	Senior	Graduation
Mory Bamba	DB	6'3"	190	Senior	Graduation
Jayden Dunlap	DB	6'0"	185	Senior	Graduation
Ethan Erickson	TE	6'5"	245	Senior	Graduation
Will Ferrin	K	6'3"	175	Senior	Graduation
Garrison Grimes	LS	6'2"	220	Senior	Graduation
Isaiah Jatta	OL	6'6"	315	Senior	Graduation
Jack Kelly	LB	6'2"	242	Senior	Graduation
Austin Leausa	OL	6'5"	315	Senior	Graduation
Logan Lutui	DL	6'2"	260	Senior	Graduation
Enoch Nawahine	RB	5'10"	205	Senior	Graduation
Kaufusi Pafoke	DL	6'4"	345	Senior	Graduation
Chase Roberts	WR	6'4"	210	Senior	Graduation
Carsen Ryan	TE	6'4"	250	Senior	Graduation
John Taumoepeau	DL	6'3"	300	Senior	Graduation
Tanner Wall	DB	6'1"	205	Senior	Graduation
Sam Vander Haar	P	6'0"	220	Junior	Graduation
Cole Hagen	QB	6'1"	185	Sophomore	Graduation
Emerson Geilman	QB	6'4"	207	Freshman	Mission
Tyler Payne	LB	6'1"	220	Freshman	Mission
Andrew Williams	OL	6'8"	295	Freshman	Mission
Weylin Lapuaho	OL	6'4"	310	Senior	Transfer
Lamason Waller III	WR	6'1"	190	Freshman	Transfer
Dominique McKenzie	WR	5'11"	180	Freshman	Transfer
Jake Griffin	OL	6'5"	305	Sophomore	Transfer
Marcus McKenzie	DB	5'11"	185	Sophomore	Transfer
McCae Hillstead	QB	5'10"	195	Sophomore	Transfer
Ikinasio Tupou	OL	6'6"	295	Freshman	Transfer
Tucker Kelleher	TE	6'6"	225	Freshman	Transfer
Sani Tuala	DL	6'5"	270	Sophomore	Transfer
Sione Hingano	OL	6'6"	300	Freshman	Transfer
Tayvion Beasley	DB	5'11"	185	Junior	Transfer
Max Alford	LB	6'1"	230	Junior	Transfer
Choe Bryant-Strother	LB	6'3"	240	Junior	Transfer
Parker Kingston	WR	5'11"	185	Junior	
Carter Hancock	WR	6'0"	170	Freshman	
Quinn Hale	WR	5'10"	175	Freshman	
Naki Tuakoi	LB	6'3"	220	Freshman	
Anthony Olsen	TE	6'4"	250	Junior	
Cody Hagen	WR	6'1"	185	Sophomore	
Cole Clement	TE	6'4"	240	Freshman	
Rowan Reay	WR	6'3"	190	Junior	
Ephraim Asiata	LB	6'3"	210	Sophomore	
Kaden Chidester	OL	6'8"	325	Sophomore	

== Schedule ==
Date	Time	Opponent	Rank	Site	TV	Result	Attendance
September 5	6:00 p.m.	Utah Tech*	No. 14т	LaVell Edwards Stadium; Provo, UT	ESPN+	W 63–7	64,077
September 12	1:30 p.m.	Arizona	No. 15	LaVell Edwards Stadium; Provo, UT	FOX	W 28–17	64,409
September 19	5:30 p.m.	at Colorado State*	No. 11	Canvas Stadium; Fort Collins, CO	CBS	W 41–23	38,759
October 3	5:00 p.m.	at TCU	No. 10	Amon G. Carter Stadium; Fort Worth, TX	ESPN	W 17–10	38,327
October 9	8:15 p.m.	Iowa State^{†}	No. 8	LaVell Edwards Stadium; Provo, UT	ESPN	W 24–10	64,632
October 17	5:30 p.m.	No. 2 Notre Dame*	No. 8	LaVell Edwards Stadium; Provo, UT (College GameDay)	ABC	W 28–24	65,179
October 24	1:30 p.m.	at UCF	No. 2	Acrisure Bounce House; Orlando, FL	FOX	L 31–39 ^{2OT}	45,112
October 31	1:30 p.m.	Arizona State	No. 8	LaVell Edwards Stadium; Provo, UT	FOX	W 27–20	63,332
November 7	10:00 a.m.	at No. 3 Utah	No. 9	Rice–Eccles Stadium; Salt Lake City, UT (Holy War)	ABC	L 20–28	52,901
November 14	5:00 p.m.	Baylor	No. 10	LaVell Edwards Stadium; Provo, UT	FOX	W 28–7	63,008
November 21	10:00 a.m.	at Kansas	No. 10	David Booth Kansas Memorial Stadium; Lawrence, KS	ABC	W 31–29 ^{3OT}	30,121
November 28	1:30 p.m.	Cincinnati		LaVell Edwards Stadium; Provo, UT	FOX		
*Non-conference game; ^{†}Homecoming; Rankings from AP Poll (and CFP Rankings, after November 3) - Released prior to game; All times are in Mountain time; Source:

== Rankings ==
Ranking movements Legend: ██ Increase in ranking ██ Decrease in ranking т = Tied with team above or below ( ) = First-place votes
	Week															
Poll	Pre	1	2	3	4	5	6	7	8	9	10	11	12	13	14	Final
AP	14т	15	11	9	10	8	8	2 (20)	8	7	12	12				
Coaches	15	15	13	9	9	8	8	3 (10)	9	8	12	12				
CFP	Not released									9	10	10				Not released

== Game summaries ==
=== vs. Utah Tech (FCS) ===
Utah Tech Trailblazers (FCS) (0–1) at No. 14т BYU Cougars (0–0) – Game summary

Quarter	1	2	3	4	Total
Trailblazers (FCS)	0	0	7	0	7
No. 14т Cougars	14	28	14	7	63

at LaVell Edwards Stadium • Provo, Utah

- Date: September 5, 2026
- Game time: 6:00 p.m. MDT
- Game weather: Sunny, clear • Temperature: 86 °F (30 °C) • Wind: SW 8 mph (13 km/h)
- Game attendance: 64,077
- Referee: Michael McCabe
- TV announcers (ESPN+): Pete Sousa, Leger Douzable, and Austyn Iven

Game information

First quarter

- BYU – 13:05 Legend Glasker 9-yard run (Matthias Dunn kick). BYU 7–0. Drive: 5 plays, 32 yards, 1:39.
- BYU – 3:53 Jojo Phillips 29-yard pass from Bear Bachmeier (Matthias Dunn kick). BYU 14–0. Drive: 13 plays, 82 yards, 7:29.

Second quarter

- BYU – 14:53 Legend Glasker 26-yard pass from Bear Bachmeier (Matthias Dunn kick). BYU 21–0. Drive: 2 plays, 30 yards, 0:38.
- BYU – 11:22 Preston Rex 9-yard run (Matthias Dunn kick). BYU 28–0. Drive: 5 plays, 65 yards, 2:19.
- BYU – 7:47 Legend Glasker 33-yard pass from Bear Bachmeier (Matthias Dunn kick). BYU 35–0. Drive: 5 plays, 66 yards, 2:36.
- BYU – 0:34 Bear Bachmeier 13-yard run (Matthias Dunn kick). BYU 42–0. Drive: 8 plays, 66 yards, 2:11.

Third quarter

- BYU – 14:42 Cannon DeVries 100-yard kickoff return (Brody Laga kick). BYU 49–0. 0:18.
- BYU – 12:30 Journee Tonga 4-yard run (Brody Laga kick). BYU 56–0. Drive: 3 plays, 55 yards, 1:13.
- UTU – 4:45 Ace Chatman 1-yard run (Dax Iverson kick). BYU 56–7. Drive: 15 plays, 75 yards, 7:45.

Fourth quarter

- BYU – 14:07 Devaughn Eka 11-yard run (Brody Laga kick). BYU 63–7. Drive: 11 plays, 69 yards, 5:33.

Statistics	UTU	BYU
First downs	11	29
Plays–yards	56–184	68–521
Rushes–yards	25–49	48–308
Passing yards	135	213
Passing: comp–att–int	15–31–3	17–22–0
Turnovers	4	0
Time of possession	26:45	33:15

Team	Category	Player	Statistics
Utah Tech	Passing	Bronsen Barben	12/22, 115 yards, INT
Utah Tech	Rushing	Ace Chatman	12 carries, 38 yards, TD
Utah Tech	Receiving	Darnell O'Quinn	3 receptions, 41 yards
BYU	Passing	Bear Bachmeier	16/20, 198 yards, 3 TD
BYU	Rushing	Devaughn Eka	8 carries, 59 yards, TD
BYU	Receiving	Legend Glasker	3 receptions, 65 yards, 2 TD

=== vs. Arizona ===
Arizona Wildcats (1–0) at No. 15 BYU Cougars (1–0) – Game summary

Quarter	1	2	3	4	Total
Wildcats	10	7	0	0	17
No. 15 Cougars	7	7	7	7	28

at LaVell Edwards Stadium • Provo, Utah

- Date: September 12
- Game time: 1:30 p.m. MDT
- Game weather: Sunny • Temperature: 84 °F (29 °C) • Wind: NE 9 mph (14 km/h)
- Game attendance: 64,409
- Referee: Michael VanderVelde
- TV announcers (FOX): Connor Onion, Robert Griffin III, and Alexa Landestoy
  (Gridiron Radio): Noah Britt, Jon Reynolds, and Robbie Bullough

Game information

First quarter

- ARIZ – 9:10 Noah Fifita 11-yard run (Michael Salgado-Medina kick). ARIZ 7–0. Drive: 12 plays, 75 yards, 5:50.
- BYU – 5:16 Bear Bachmeier 6-yard run (Matthias Dunn kick). TIED 7–7. Drive: 2 plays, 9 yards, 0:42.
- ARIZ – 0:24 Michael Salgado-Medina 37-yard Field Goal. ARIZ 10–7. Drive: 12 plays, 55 yards, 4:52.

Second quarter

- BYU – 12:46 Reggie Frischknecht 25-yard pass from Bear Bachmeier (Matthias Dunn kick). BYU 14–10. Drive: 8 plays, 75 yards, 2:38.
- ARIZ – 2:03 Shane King 16-yard pass from Noa Fifita (Michael Salgado-Medina kick). ARIZ 17–14. Drive: 10 plays, 72 yards, 5:15.

Third quarter

- BYU – 9:37 Kyler Kasper 6-yard pass from Bear Bachmeier (Matthias Dunn kick). BYU 21–17. Drive: 9 plays, 75 yards, 5:23.

Fourth quarter

- BYU – 6:10 Kyler Kasper 12-yard run (Matthias Dunn kick). BYU 28–17. Drive: 4 plays, 82 yards, 2:06.

Statistics	ARIZ	BYU
First downs	19	17
Plays–yards	62–327	56–365
Rushes–yards	31–97	30–148
Passing yards	230	217
Passing: comp–att–int	23–31–1	16–26–0
Turnovers	1	0
Time of possession	33:41	26:19

Team	Category	Player	Statistics
Arizona	Passing	Noah Fifita	23/31, 239 yards, TD, INT
Arizona	Rushing	Kedrick Reescano	15 carries, 49 yards
Arizona	Receiving	Cole Rusk	2 receptions, 48 yards
BYU	Passing	Bear Bachmeier	16/26, 217 yards, 3 TD
BYU	Rushing	LJ Martin	20 carries, 98 yards
BYU	Receiving	Legend Glasker	3 receptions, 74 yards

=== at Colorado State ===
No. 11 BYU Cougars (2–0) at Colorado State Rams (2–0) – Game summary

Quarter	1	2	3	4	Total
No. 11 Cougars	21	10	7	3	41
Rams	7	0	0	16	23

at Canvas Stadium • Fort Collins, Colorado

- Date: September 19
- Game time: 5:30 p.m. MDT
- Game weather: Cloudy • Temperature: 70 °F (21 °C) • Wind: NE 7 mph (11 km/h)
- Game attendance: 38,759
- Referee: Kevin Mar
- TV announcers (CBS): Rich Waltz, Adam Breneman, Brian Kelly, and Jordan Giorgio

Game information

First quarter

- BYU – 14:11 LJ Martin 56-yard run (Matthias Dunn kick). BYU 7–0. Drive: 2 plays, 65 yards, 0:49.
- CSU – 11:22 Reginald Vick Jr. 7-yard reception from Hauss Hejny (Kali Nguma kick). TIED 7–7. Drive: 7 plays, 75 yards, 2:49.
- BYU – 9:42 LJ Martin 2-yard run (Matthias Dunn kick). BYU 14–7. Drive: 3 plays, 81 yards, 1:36.
- BYU – 0:51 LJ Martin 8-yard run (Matthias Dunn kick). BYU 21–7. Drive: 6 plays, 73 yards, 3:05.

Second quarter

- BYU – 6:11 Matthias Dunn 44-yard Field Goal. BYU 24–7. Drive: 10 plays, 71 yards, 6:13.
- BYU – 1:18 Legend Glasker 5-yard run (Matthias Dunn kick). BYU 31–7. Drive: 5 plays, 78 yards, 1:38.

Third quarter

- BYU – 9:29 Preston Rex 5-yard run (Matthias Dunn kick). BYU 38–7. Drive: 8 plays, 53 yards, 3:55.

Fourth quarter

- CSU – 12:16 Durrell Robinson 1-yard run (Jackson Harper 2-pt pass from Darius Curry). BYU 38–15. Drive: 6 plays, 45 yards, 3:19.
- BYU – 6:42 Matthias Dunn 26-yard Field Goal. BYU 41–15. Drive: 9 plays, 67 yards, 5:34.
- CSU – 1:58 Nader Chirchi 1-yard reception from Darius Curry (Tommy Maher 2-pt pass from Darius Curry). BYU 41–23. Drive: 11 plays, 75 yards, 4:44.

Statistics	BYU	CSU
First downs	21	17
Plays–yards	58–559	65–302
Rushes–yards	41–332	24–82
Passing yards	227	220
Passing: comp–att–int	12–17–2	25–41–1
Time of possession	33:24	26:36

Team	Category	Player	Statistics
BYU	Passing	Bear Bachmeier	12/16, 227 yards, INT
BYU	Rushing	LJ Martin	15 carries, 176 yards, 3 TD
BYU	Receiving	Legend Glasker	5 receptions, 131 yards
Colorado State	Passing	Hauss Hejny	6/10, 80 yards, TD
Colorado State	Rushing	Durell Robinson	6 carries, 29 yards, TD
Colorado State	Receiving	Cedric Ross	4 receptions, 85 yards

=== at TCU ===
No. 10 BYU Cougars (3–0) at TCU Horned Frogs (2–2) – Game summary

Quarter	1	2	3	4	Total
No. 10 Cougars	0	7	3	7	17
Horned Frogs	0	7	0	3	10

at Amon G. Carter Stadium • Fort Worth, Texas

- Date: October 3
- Game time: 5 p.m. MDT
- Game weather: Rain • Temperature: 72 °F (22 °C) • Wind: N 8 mph (13 km/h)
- Game attendance: 38,327
- Referee: Cravonne Barrett
- TV announcers (ESPN): Tom Hart, Roddy Jones, and Quint Kessenich

Game information

First quarter

No scoring plays

Second quarter

- BYU – 7:52 Bear Bachmeier 9-yard run (Matthias Dunn kick). BYU 7–0. Drive: 6 plays, 16 yards, 2:57.
- TCU – 0:27 Kari Ashley 13-yard reception from Jaden Craig (Nate McCashland kick). TIED 7–7. Drive: 8 plays, 76 yards, 3:29.

Third quarter

- BYU – 7:34 Matthias Dunn 49-yard Field Goal. BYU 10–7. Drive: 10 plays, 32 yards, 6:00.

Fourth quarter

- BYU – 2:06 Bear Bachmeier 21-yard run (Matthias Dunn kick). BYU 17–7. Drive: 10 plays, 72 yards, 5:55.
- TCU – 0:32 Nate McCashland 44-yard Field Goal. BYU 17–10. Drive: 8 plays, 51 yards, 1:26.

Statistics	BYU	TCU
First downs	15	14
Plays–yards	62–216	55–259
Rushes–yards	38–154	30–72
Passing yards	62	187
Passing: comp–att–int	11–24–0	18–25–1
Time of possession	32:57	27:03

Team	Category	Player	Statistics
BYU	Passing	Bear Bachmeier	11/24, 62 yards
BYU	Rushing	Bear Bachmeier	15 carries, 66 yards, 2 TD
BYU	Receiving	Kyler Kasper	2 receptions, 22 yards
TCU	Passing	Jaden Craig	18/25, 187 yards, TD, INT
TCU	Rushing	Jeremy Payne	14 carries, 77 yards
TCU	Receiving	Kari Ashley	6 receptions, 108 yards, TD

=== vs. Iowa State ===
Iowa State Cyclones (3–2) at No. 8 BYU Cougars (4–0) – Game summary

Quarter	1	2	3	4	Total
Cyclones	0	3	0	7	10
No. 8 Cougars	7	7	7	3	24

at LaVell Edwards Stadium • Provo, Utah

- Date: October 9
- Game time: 8:15 p.m. MDT
- Game weather: Clear w/ showers on and off • Temperature: 75 °F (24 °C) • Wind: NW 9 mph (14 km/h)
- Game attendance: 64,632
- Referee: Tutashinda Salaam
- TV announcers (ESPN): Anish Shroff, Andre Ware, and Morgan Uber
  (ESPN Unlimited (SAP)): Javier Trejo Garay and Mauricio Gutiérrez
  (Gridiron Radio): Noah Britt, Jon Reynolds, and Robbie Bullough

Game information

First quarter

- BYU – 8:52 Journee Tonga 6-yard run (Matthias Dunn kick). BYU 7–0. Drive: 10 plays, 75 yards, 6:08.

Second quarter

- ISU – 14:01 Kyle Konrardy 40-yard Field Goal. BYU 7–3. Drive: 11 plays, 33 yards, 4:50.
- BYU – 1:51 Kyler Kasper 5-yard pass from Bear Bachmeier (Matthias Dunn kick). BYU 14–3. Drive: 4 plays, 71 yards, 0:53.

Third quarter

- BYU – 1:09 Legend Glasker 75-yard pass from Bear Bachmeier (Matthias Dunn kick). BYU 21–3. Drive: 3 plays, 79 yards, 1:25.

Fourth quarter

- ISU – 12:51 Christian Greenlaw 1-yard pass from Jaylen Raynor (Kyle Konrardy kick). BYU 21–10. Drive: 6 plays, 49 yards, 1:56.
- BYU – 1:51 Matthias Dunn 38-yard Field Goal. BYU 24–10. Drive: 6 plays, 52 yards, 1:56.

Statistics	ISU	BYU
First downs	56	61
Plays–yards	56–200	61–506
Rushes–yards	27–102	31–177
Passing yards	98	329
Passing: comp–att–int	16–29–0	22–30–0
Time of possession	27:17	32:43

Team	Category	Player	Statistics
Iowa State	Passing	Jaylen Raynor	16/29, 98 yards, TD
Iowa State	Rushing	Aiden Flora	17 carries, 86 yards
Iowa State	Receiving	Ty Claiborne	3 receptions, 31 yards
BYU	Passing	Bear Bachmeier	22/30, 329 yards, 2 TD
BYU	Rushing	Bear Bachmeier	9 carries, 109 yards
BYU	Receiving	Legend Glasker	5 receptions, 99 yards, TD

=== vs. No. 2 Notre Dame ===
No. 2 Notre Dame Fighting Irish (6–0) at No. 8 BYU Cougars (5–0) – Game summary

Quarter	1	2	3	4	Total
No. 2 Fighting Irish	3	7	6	8	24
No. 8 Cougars	7	14	0	7	28

at LaVell Edwards Stadium • Provo, Utah

- Date: October 17
- Game time: 5:44 p.m. MDT
- Game weather: Sunny and clear • Temperature: 73 °F (23 °C) • Wind: W 3 mph (4.8 km/h)
- Game attendance: 65,179
- Referee: Luke Richmond
- TV announcers (ABC): Chris Fowler, Kirk Herbstreit, and Holly Rowe

Game information

First quarter

- BYU – 9:21 Bear Bachmeier 5-yard run (Matthias Dunn kick). BYU 7–0. Drive: 11 plays, 75 yards, 5:39.
- ND – 5:06 Spencer Porath 46-yard Field Goal. BYU 7–3. Drive: 9 plays, 46 yards, 4:15.

Second quarter

- ND – 10:37 Nolan James Jr. 8-yard run (Spencer Porath kick). ND 10–7. Drive: 12 plays, 84 yards, 5:45.
- BYU – 5:52 Bear Bachmeier 15-yard pass from Kyler Kasper (Matthias Dunn kick). BYU 14–10. Drive: 10 plays, 75 yards, 4:45.
- BYU – 1:29 Bear Bachmeier 1-yard run (Matthias Dunn kick). BYU 21–10. Drive: 8 plays, 73 yards, 2:50.

Third quarter

- ND – 3:17 Spencer Porath 31-yard Field Goal. BYU 21–13. Drive: 10 plays, 28 yards, 4:06.
- ND – 0:11 Spencer Porath 39-yard Field Goal. BYU 21–16. Drive: 4 plays, 3 yards, 1:29.

Fourth quarter

- ND – 9:31 Jonaz Walton 3-yard run (Jonaz Walton run). ND 24–21. Drive: 9 plays, 68 yards, 4:40.
- BYU – 1:47 Walker Lyons 6-yard pass from Bear Bachmeier (Matthias Dunn kick). BYU 28–24. Drive: 10 plays, 55 yards, 3:56.

Statistics	ND	BYU
First downs	21	23
Plays–yards	79–376	67–360
Rushes–yards	30–115	30–121
Passing yards	261	239
Passing: comp–att–int	27–49–0	24–37–1
Turnovers	1	2
Time of possession	30:59	29:01

Team	Category	Player	Statistics
Notre Dame	Passing	CJ Carr	27/49, 261 yards
Notre Dame	Rushing	Nolan James Jr.	16 carries, 77 yards, TD
Notre Dame	Receiving	Jaden Greathouse	8 receptions, 125 yards
BYU	Passing	Bear Bachmeier	23/36, 224 yards, TD, INT
BYU	Rushing	Preston Rex	10 carries, 66 yards
BYU	Receiving	Kyler Kasper & Legend Glasker	6 receptions/5 receptions, 66 yards

In the final play of the game, Notre Dame quarterback CJ Carr threw an incomplete pass intended for wide receiver Jaden Greathouse that was broken up by BYU cornerback Evan Johnson. Controversy arose when many analysts believed that Johnson should have been penalized for pass interference, as well as multiple shots showing the stadium clock having one second left when the ball touched the ground. After the game, the Big 12 Conference stated that the game clock had one second left when the game was declared over and that the play was incorrectly cleared by the replay officiating crew. Had the game not been declared over, Notre Dame would have had another attempt to score from BYU's 8-yard line. The game's ending has been compared to Michigan's controversial win over Western Michigan in September 2026.

=== at UCF ===
No. 2 BYU Cougars (6–0) at UCF Knights (3–3) – Game summary

Quarter	1	2	3	4	OT	2OT	Total
No. 2 Cougars	7	7	7	3	7	0	31
Knights	0	17	7	0	7	8	39

at Acrisure Bounce House • Orlando, Florida

- Date: October 24
- Game time: 1:30 p.m. MDT
- Game weather: Cloudy w/ Rain off-and-on • Temperature: 78 °F (26 °C) • Wind: SW 14 mph (23 km/h) with gusts up to 28 mph (45 km/h)
- Game attendance: 45,112
- Referee: Michael McCabe
- TV announcers (FOX): Connor Onion, Robert Griffin III, and Alexa Landestoy

Game information

First quarter

- BYU – 8:19 Kyler Kasper 27-yard pass from Bear Bachmeier (Matthias Dunn kick). BYU 7–0. Drive: 11 plays, 84 yards, 5:49.

Second quarter

- UCF – 13:44 Landen Chambers 2-yard run (Will Stone kick). TIED 7–7. Drive: 8 plays, 62 yards, 4:10.
- UCF – 8:10 Will Stone 20-yard Field Goal. UCF 10–7. Drive: 12 plays, 64 yards, 5:09.
- BYU – 3:47 Bear Bachmeier 1-yard run (Matthias Dunn kick). BYU 14–10. Drive: 8 plays, 75 yards, 4:23.
- UCF – 0:04 Landen Chambers 4-yard pass from Keyone Jenkins (Will Stone kick). UCF 17–14. Drive: 11 plays, 78 yards, 1:18.

Third quarter

- BYU – 9:45 Sione Moa 1-yard run (Matthias Dunn kick). BYU 21–17. Drive: 9 plays, 75 yards, 5:15.
- UCF – 3:06 Keyone Jenkins 1-yard run (Will Stone kick). UCF 24–21. Drive: 11 plays, 75 yards, 6:39.

Fourth quarter

- BYU – 12:09 Matthias Dunn 44-yard Field Goal. TIED 24–24. Drive: 12 plays, 46 yards, 5:57.

Overtime

- BYU – Legend Glasker 28-yard pass from Bear Bachmeier (Matthias Dunn kick). BYU 31–24. Drive: 3 plays, 25 yards.
- UCF – Josh Derry 25-yard pass from Keyone Jenkins (Will Stone kick). TIED 31–31. Drive: 1 play, 25 yards.

Double Overtime

- UCF – Grayson Brousseau 4-yard pass from Keyone Jenkins (Tyren Hornes 2-pt reception from Keyone Jenkins). UCF 39–31. Drive: 7 plays, 25 yards.

Statistics	BYU	UCF
First downs	18	25
Plays–yards	68–373	83–463
Rushes–yards	38–116	41–170
Passing yards	257	293
Passing: comp–att–int	16–32–1	25–42–0
Time of possession	27:25	32:35

Team	Category	Player	Statistics
BYU	Passing	Bear Bachmeier	16/32, 252 yards, 2 TD, INT
BYU	Rushing	Preston Rex	5 carries, 42 yards
BYU	Receiving	Kyler Kasper	6 receptions, 129 yards, TD
UCF	Passing	Keyone Jenkins	25/41, 293 yards, 3 TD
UCF	Rushing	Duke Watson	15 carries, 94 yards
UCF	Receiving	Tyren Hornes	6 receptions, 137 yards, 2-pt conversion

=== vs. Arizona State ===
Arizona State Sun Devils (4–3) at No. 8 BYU Cougars (6–1) – Game summary

Quarter	1	2	3	4	Total
Sun Devils	0	3	14	3	20
No. 8 Cougars	7	10	0	10	27

at LaVell Edwards Stadium • Provo, Utah

- Date: October 31
- Game time: 1:30 p.m. MDT
- Game weather: Cloudy • Temperature: 55 °F (13 °C) • Wind: SW 4 mph (6.4 km/h)
- Game attendance: 63,332
- Referee: Stephen Baron
- TV announcers (FOX): Connor Onion, Robert Griffin III, and Alexa Landestoy
  (Gridiron Radio): Noah Britt, Jon Reynolds, and Robbie Bullough

Game information

First quarter

- BYU – 10:47 Sione Moa 1-yard fumble recovery in the endzone (Matthias Dunn kick). BYU 7–0. Drive: 6 plays, 29 yards, 3:09.

Second quarter

- ASU – 14:06 Carson Smith 24-yard Field Goal. BYU 7–3. Drive: 13 plays, 53 yards, 5:16.
- BYU – 6:22 Matthias Dunn 28-yard Field Goal. BYU 10–3. Drive: 9 plays, 60 yards, 4:31.
- BYU – 1:55 Kyler Kasper 13-yard pass from Bear Bachmeier (Matthias Dunn kick). BYU 17–3. Drive: 7 plays, 48 yards, 3:08.

Third quarter

- ASU – 6:30 Omarion Miller 20-yard pass from Jake Fette (Carson Smith kick). BYU 17–10. Drive: 13 plays, 81 yards, 6:16.
- ASU – 1:15 Anthony Miller Jr. 1-yard pass from Jake Fette (Carson Smith kick). TIED 17–17. Drive: 12 plays, 39 yards, 4:55.

Fourth quarter

- BYU – 12:08 Matthias Dunn 45-yard Field Goal. BYU 20–17. Drive: 9 plays, 39 yards, 4:02.
- BYU – 2:09 Sione Moa 1-yard run (Matthias Dunn kick). BYU 27–17. Drive: 11 plays, 95 yards, 6:00.
- ASU – 0:57 Carson Smith 44-yard Field Goal. BYU 27–20. Drive: 7 plays, 49 yards, 1:00.

Statistics	ASU	BYU
First downs	20	18
Plays–yards	76–279	60–283
Rushes–yards	34–113	30–47
Passing yards	166	236
Passing: comp–att–int	22–42–0	19–30–1
Time of possession	31:25	28:35

Team	Category	Player	Statistics
Arizona State	Passing	Jake Fette	22/42, 166 yards, 2 TD
Arizona State	Rushing	Cardae Mack	23 carries, 123 yards
Arizona State	Receiving	Derek Eusebio	7 receptions, 48 yards
BYU	Passing	Bear Bachmeier	19/30, 236 yards, TD, INT
BYU	Rushing	Sione Moa	8 carries, 20 yards, 2 TD
BYU	Receiving	Legend Glasker	4 receptions, 87 yards

=== at No. 3 Utah (Holy War) ===
No. 9 BYU Cougars (7–1) at No. 3 Utah Utes (8–0) – Game summary

Quarter	1	2	3	4	Total
No. 9 Cougars	3	17	0	0	20
No. 3 Utes	14	0	7	7	28

at Rice–Eccles Stadium • Salt Lake City, Utah

- Date: November 7
- Game time: 10:00 a.m. MST
- Game weather: Sunny • Temperature: 50 °F (10 °C) • Wind: SW 2 mph (3.2 km/h)
- Game attendance: 52,901
- Referee: Michael VanderVelde
- TV announcers (ABC): Dave Pasch, Dusty Dvoracek, and Taylor McGregor
  (Gridiron Radio): Chris Sylvester, Noah Britt, Jon Reynolds, and Robbie Bullough

Game information

First quarter

- UTAH – 13:45 Devon Dampier 22-yard run (Dillon Curtis kick). UTAH 7–0. Drive: 3 plays, 75 yards, 1:15.
- UTAH – 10:31 Braden Pegan 46-yard pass from Devon Dampier (Dillon Curtis kick). UTAH 14–0. Drive: 4 plays, 63 yards, 1:19.
- BYU – 6:04 Matthias Dunn 31-yard Field Goal. UTAH 14–3. Drive: 8 plays, 62 yards, 4:27.

Second quarter

- BYU – 14:51 Matthias Dunn 38-yard Field Goal. UTAH 14–6. Drive: 9 plays, 37 yards, 4:45.
- BYU – 13:17 Legend Glasker 75-yard pass from Bear Bachmeier (Matthias Dunn kick). UTAH 14–13. Drive: 1 plays, 75 yards, 0:10.
- BYU – 7:35 LJ Martin 4-yard run (Matthias Dunn kick). BYU 20–14. Drive: 8 plays, 49 yards, 4:08.

Third quarter

- UTAH – 1:50 Braden Pegan 14-yard pass from Devon Dampier (Dillon Curtis kick). UTAH 21–20. Drive: 9 plays, 53 yards, 5:24.

Fourth quarter

- UTAH – 12:03 Devon Dampier 3-yard run (Dillon Curtis kick). UTAH 28–20. Drive: 7 plays, 68 yards, 4:07.

Statistics	BYU	UTAH
First downs	15	16
Plays–yards	64–391	62–328
Rushes–yards	28–119	35–122
Passing yards	272	206
Passing: comp–att–int	21–36–4	15–27–0
Time of possession	31:52	28:08

Team	Category	Player	Statistics
BYU	Passing	Bear Bachmeier	21/35, 272 yards, TD, 4 INT
BYU	Rushing	Bear Bachmeier	8 carries, 59 yards
BYU	Receiving	Legend Glasker	7 receptions, 118 yards, TD
Utah	Passing	Devon Dampier	14/26, 177 yards, 2 TD
Utah	Rushing	Devon Dampier	20 carries, 87 yards, 2 TD
Utah	Receiving	Braden Pegan	5 receptions, 86 yards, 2 TD

=== vs. Baylor ===
Baylor Bears (6–3) at No. 10 BYU Cougars (7–2) – Game summary

Quarter	1	2	3	4	Total
Bears	0	0	0	7	7
No. 10 Cougars	14	7	0	7	28

at LaVell Edwards Stadium • Provo, Utah

- Date: November 14
- Game time: 5:00 p.m. MST
- Game weather: Cloudy • Temperature: 45 °F (7 °C) • Wind: SW 3 mph (4.8 km/h)
- Game attendance: 63,008
- Referee: Luke Richmond
- TV announcers (FOX): Jack Kizer and Mark Helfrich
  (Gridiron Radio): Noah Britt, Marcus Robertson, and Robbie Bullough

Game information

First quarter

- BYU – 9:14 Bear Bachmeier 8-yard run (Matthias Dunn kick). BYU 7–0. Drive: 9 plays, 58 yards, 4:07.
- BYU – 0:10 Bear Bachmeier 5-yard run (Matthias Dunn kick). BYU 14–0. Drive: 12 plays, 86 yards, 6:54.

Second quarter

- BYU – 1:40 Bear Bachmeier 1-yard run (Matthias Dunn kick). BYU 21–0. Drive: 18 plays, 96 yards, 9:03.

Third quarter
Fourth quarter

- BAY – 11:18 Matthew Klopfenstein 3-yard pass from DJ Lagway (Rhett Armstrong kick). BYU 21–7. Drive: 8 plays, 73 yards, 2:10.
- BYU – 6:43 Jojo Phillips 23-yard pass from Bear Bachmeier (Matthias Dunn kick). BYU 28–7. Drive: 3 plays, 26 yards, 0:54.

Statistics	BAY	BYU
First downs	16	22
Plays–yards	60–238	72–312
Rushes–yards	23–79	47–189
Passing yards	159	123
Passing: comp–att–int	21–37–1	15–25–0
Time of possession	22:59	37:01

Team	Category	Player	Statistics
Baylor	Passing	DJ Lagway	21/37, 159 yards, TD, INT
Baylor	Rushing	DJ Lagway	11 carries, 42 yards
Baylor	Receiving	Jadon Porter	5 receptions, 50 yards
BYU	Passing	Bear Bachmeier	14/24, 104 yards, TD
BYU	Rushing	Bear Bachmeier	15 carries, 54 yards, 3 TD
BYU	Receiving	Walker Lyons	3 receptions, 49 yards

=== at Kansas ===
No. 10 BYU Cougars (8–2) at Kansas Jayhawks (4–6) – Game summary

Quarter	1	2	3	4	OT	2OT	3OT	Total
No. 10 Cougars	0	3	13	0	7	6	2	31
Jayhawks	3	3	0	10	7	6	0	29

at David Booth Kansas Memorial Stadium • Lawrence, Kansas

- Date: November 21
- Game time: 10:00 a.m. MST
- Game weather: Sunny • Temperature: 66 °F (19 °C) • Wind: SW 17 mph (27 km/h)
- Game attendance: 30,121
- Referee: Cravonne Barett
- TV announcers (ABC): Bob Wischusen, Louis Riddick, and Stormy Buonantony

Game information

First quarter

- KAN – 2:50 Martin Connington 28-yard Field Goal. KAN 3–0. Drive: 10 plays, 68 yards, 5:40.

Second quarter

- BYU – 5:45 Matthias Dunn 52-yard Field Goal. TIED 3–3. Drive: 13 plays, 63 yards, 7:02.
- KAN – 0:00 Martin Connington 24-yard Field Goal. KAN 6–3. Drive: 8 plays, 23 yards, 2:12.

Third quarter

- BYU – 12:19 Matthias Dunn 36-yard Field Goal. TIED 6–6. Drive: 7 plays, 47 yards, 2:35.
- BYU – 8:32 Matthias Dunn 26-yard Field Goal. BYU 9–6. Drive: 9 plays, 35 yards, 3:42.
- BYU – 3:12 Bear Bachmeier 7-yard run (Matthias Dunn kick). BYU 16–6. Drive: 8 plays, 41 yards, 4:01.

Fourth quarter

- KAN – 12:10 Martin Connington 26-yard Field Goal. BYU 16–9. Drive: 13 plays, 67 yards, 6:02.
- KAN – 4:03 Cam Pickett 24-yard pass from Isaiah Marshall (Martin Connington kick). TIED 16–16. Drive: 10 plays, 59 yards, 4:39.

Overtime

- KAN – Isaiah Marshall 10-yard run (Martin Connington kick). KAN 23–16. Drive: 6 plays, 25 yards.
- BYU – Bear Bachmeier 2-yard run (Matthias Dunn kick). TIED 23–23. Drive: 3 plays, 25 yards.

Double Overtime

- BYU – LJ Martin 11-yard run (Bachmeier Pass Failed). BYU 29–23. Drive: 4 plays, 25 yards.
- KAN – Nahzae Cox 20-yard pass from Isaiah Marshall (Marshall Pass Failed). TIED 29–29. Drive: 4 plays, 25 yards.

Triple Overtime

- BYU – Jojo Phillips 3-yard conversion pass from Bear Bachmeier. BYU 31–29. Drive: 1 play, 3 yards.

Statistics	BYU	KAN
First downs	21	19
Plays–yards	73–381	67–359
Rushes–yards	47–208	38–154
Passing yards	173	205
Passing: comp–att–int	15–26–0	21–29–2
Time of possession	32:45	27:15

Team	Category	Player	Statistics
BYU	Passing	Bear Bachmeier	15–26, 173 yards, 2 PT Conversion
BYU	Rushing	LJ Martin	25 carries, 127 yards, TD
BYU	Receiving	Walker Lyons	3 receptions, 59 yards
Kansas	Passing	Isaiah Marshall	20/28, 186 yards, 2 TD, 2 INT
Kansas	Rushing	Isaiah Marshall	18 carries, 90 yards, TD
Kansas	Receiving	Keaton Kubecka	6 receptions, 73 yards

=== vs. Cincinnati ===
Cincinnati Bearcats (0–0) at BYU Cougars (0–0) – Game summary

Quarter	1	2	3	4	Total
Bearcats	0	0	0	0	0
Cougars	0	0	0	0	0

at LaVell Edwards Stadium • Provo, Utah

- Date: November 28
- Game time: 1:30 p.m. MST
- TV announcers (FOX):
  (Gridiron Radio): Noah Britt, Jon Reynolds, and Robbie Bullough

Game information

First quarter
Second quarter
Third quarter
Fourth quarter

Statistics	CIN	BYU
First downs		
Plays–yards		
Rushes–yards		
Passing yards		
Passing: comp–att–int		
Time of possession		

Team	Category	Player	Statistics
Cincinnati	Passing		
Cincinnati	Rushing		
Cincinnati	Receiving		
BYU	Passing		
BYU	Rushing		
BYU	Receiving		

== Personnel ==
=== Coaching staff ===
Name	Position
Kalani Sitake	Head coach
Sione Po'uha	Associate head coach/defensive line coach
Kelly Poppinga	Defensive coordinator/inside linebackers coach
Aaron Roderick	Offensive coordinator/quarterbacks coach
Justin Ena	Special teams coordinator
TJ Woods	Run game coordinator/offensive line coach
Fesi Sitake	Passing game coordinator/wide receivers coach
Harvey Unga	Running backs coach
Kevin M. Gilbride	Tight ends coach
Demario Warren	Defensive pass game coordinator/safeties coach
Lewis Walker	Cornerbacks coach
Chad Kauha’aha’a	Outside linebackers coach

=== Roster ===
2026 BYU Cougars football team roster
Players
Coaches
Offense

Pos.	#	Name	Class
QB	47	Bear Bachmeier	So
QB	10	Treyson Bourguet	Sr
QB	16	Owen Geilman	So
QB	15	John Sanders	So
QB	17	Enoch Watson	Fr
OL	65	Brigham Alexander	Fr
OL	54	Jake Alexander	Fr
OL	72	Joe Brown	So
OL	58	Paki Finau	So
OL	75	Andrew Gentry (injured)	Sr
OL	59	Siosiua Latu-Finau	Fr
OL	76	Jeff Lewis	Fr
OL	53	Strantz Mangisi	Fr
OL	51	Sonny Makasini	Sr
OL	73	Caden McKee	Fr
OL	63	Bruce Mitchell	Sr
OL	52	Bott Mulitalo	Fr
OL	74	Trevin Ostler (injured)	Sr
OL	67	Trevor Pay	So
OL	57	Talitu'i Pututau	Fr
OL	64	Kyle Sfarcioc	Sr
OL	62	Jr Sia	Jr
OL	78	Ethan Thomason (injured)	Fr
OL	56	Zak Yamauchi	So
RB	42	Micah Beckstead	Fr
RB	28	Jovesa Damuni (injured)	So
RB	25	Devaughn Eka	Fr
RB	41	Lucky Finau	Jr
RB	4	LJ Martin	Sr
RB	34	Charlie Miska	So
RB	30	Sione Moa (injured)	So
RB	38	Logan Payne	Fr
RB	12	Preston Rex	Sr
RB	20	Journee Tonga	Fr
TE	44	Josh Davis	Fr
TE	87	Matthew Fredrick	Fr
TE	7	Walker Lyons	Jr
TE	82	Noah Moeaki	So
TE	45	Keayen Nead	Sr
TE	80	Jacob Nye	Fr
TE	2	Roger Saleapaga	Jr
TE	24	Ethan Wood	Jr
TE	83	Will Zundel (injured)	So
WR	19	Tiger Bachmeier	Sr
WR	33	Jared Esplin	Fr
WR	18	Reggie Frischknecht	So
WR	1	Legend Glasker	Fr
WR	26	Fisher Ingersoll	Sr
WR	3	Kyler Kasper	Jr
WR	84	Kila Keone	Fr
WR	0	Tei Nacua	So
WR	89	Jett Nelson	Fr
WR	13	Jojo Phillips	Jr
WR	5	Jaron Pula	Fr
WR	22	Trey Roberts	Fr
WR	23	Terrance Saryon	Fr
WR	21	Asher Young	Fr

Defense

Pos.	#	Name	Class
DB	1	Therrian Alexander	Jr
DB	29	Justice Brathwaite	Fr
DB	28	Crew Clark	Fr
DB	26	Jordyn Criss	Fr
DB	3	Raider Damuni	Sr
DB	32	Cannon Devries	So
DB	20	Kevin Doe	Jr
DB	37	Joseph Douglas	So
DB	36	TJ Johnson	Fr
DB	0	Evan Johnson	Sr
DB	2	Jonathan Kabeya	So
DB	17	Jarinn Kalama	So
DB	27	Matthias Leach	So
DB	35	Matthew Mason	Fr
DB	22	Tommy Prassas	So
DB	7	Kennan Pula	Fr
DB	25	Lance Reynolds	Fr
DB	11	Faletau Satuala	Jr
DB	39	Seth Shigg	Fr
DB	24	Payton VanSteenkiste	So
DB	15	Jayven Williams	Sr
DL	13	Tausili Akana	Jr
DL	59	Siosefa Brown	Fr
DL	90	Hunter Clegg	So
DL	99	Ulavai Fetuli	Fr
DL	97	Kinilau Fonohema	So
DL	96	Justin Kirkland	Sr
DL	41	Nehemiah Kolone	Fr
DL	93	Kelepi Latu-Finau	Fr
DL	30	Braxton Lindsey	Fr
DL	50	Maverick McManus	Fr
DL	10	Orion Maile-Kaufusi	So
DL	42	Adney Reid	Fr
DL	45	Viliami Po'uha	Jr
DL	94	Anisi Purcell	Sr
DL	48	Bodie Schoonover	Sr
DL	58	David Tangilanu	Fr
DL	57	Keanu Tanuvasa	Sr
DL	52	Vincent Tautua (injured)	Fr
DL	98	Devoux Tautaga	Fr
DL	46	Kendal Wall	Fr
LB	43	Owen Borg	Fr
LB	31	Jake Clifton	Jr
LB	54	Siale Esera	Jr
LB	16	Isaiah Glasker (injured)	Sr
LB	21	Miles Hall	Jr
LB	18	Ace Kaufusi	Jr
LB	33	Maika Kaufusi	Jr
LB	55	Blake Lowe	Fr
LB	51	Gage Tanner	Fr
LB	34	Daniel Taumoepeau	Jr
LB	5	Nusi Taumoepeau	So
LB	4	Cade Uluave	Sr
LB	23	Pierson Watson (injured)	Fr

Special teams

Pos.	#	Name	Class
DS	47	Berkley Alfrey	Fr
DS	49	Rayden Heintz	So
DS	43	Ty Smith	Fr
P	36	Cole Shulman	Fr
P	19	Fuller Shurtz	Fr
K	97	Matthias Dunn	Sr
K	99	Brody Laga	Fr

Head coach

- Kalani Sitake (BYU)

Coordinators/assistant coaches

- Sione Po'uha (Utah)
  Associate head coach/defensive line
- Kelly Poppinga (BYU)
  Defensive coordinator/inside linebackers
- Aaron Roderick (BYU)
  Offensive coordinator/quarterbacks
- Justin Ena (BYU)
  Special teams coordinator
- TJ Woods (Azusa Pacific)
  Run game coordinator/offensive line
- Fesi Sitake (Southern Utah)
  Passing game coordinator/wide receivers
- Harvey Unga (BYU)
  Running backs
- Kevin M. Gilbride (Hawaiʻi)
  Tight ends
- Demario Warren (UC Davis)
  Defensive pass game coordinator/safeties
- Lewis Walker (Utah)
  Cornerbacks
- Chad Kauha’aha’a (Utah)
  Outside linebackers

Legend

- (C) Team captain
- (S) Suspended
- (I) Ineligible
- Injured
- Redshirt

Roster

=== Depth chart ===
Defense

FS
Raider Damuni
Tommy Prassas
Jarinn Kalama

WLB	MLB	SLB
Cade Uluave	Nusi Taumeopeau	Isaiah Glasker
Miles Hall	Braxton Lindsey	Jake Clifton
Ace Kaufusi	Maika Kaufusi	Siale Esera

SS
Faletau Satuala
Kennan Pula
Payton VanSteenkiste

CB
Therrian Alexander III
Cannon Devries
Matthias Leach

DE	DT	DT	DE
Tausili Akana	Keanu Tanuvasa	Justin Kirkland	Bodie Schoonover
Hunter Clegg	David Tangilanu	Anisi Purcell	Viliami Po'uha
Orion Maile-Kaufusi	Maverick McManus	Ulavai Fetuli	Kinilau Fonohema

CB
Evan Johnson
Jayven Williams
Kevin Doe

Offense

X-Receiver
JoJo Phillips
Reggie Frischknecht
Tiger Bachmeier

LT	LG	C	RG	RT
Paki Finau	Sonny Makasini	Bruce Mitchell	Kyle Sfarcioc	Bott Mulitalo
Caden McKee	Joe Brown	Trevor Pay	Zac Yamauchi	Siosiua Latu-Finau
Jeff Lewis	JR Sia	Strantz Mangisi	Brigham Alexander	Talitu'i Pututau

TE
Walker Lyons
Roger Saleapaga
Keayen Nead

Z-Receiver
Kyler Kasper
Legend Glasker
Tei Nacua

QB
Bear Bachmeier
Treyson Bourguet
Enoch Watson

Key reserves
DB Crew Clark
DB Jordyn Criss
DB Jonathan Kabeya
DB Joseph Douglas
TE Noah Moeaki
RB Charlie Miska
WR Terrance Saryon
WR Jared Esplin

RB
LJ Martin
Preston Rex
DeVaughn Eka

FB
Sione Moa
Journee Tonga
Logan Payne

Special teams
PK Matthias Dunn
PK Fuller Shurtz
P Fuller Shurtz
P Cole Shulman
KR Legend Glasker
KR Cannon Devries
PR Cannon Devries
PR Tiger Bachmeier
LS Ty Smith
LS Rayden Heintz
H Fuller Schurtz
H Cole Shulman
