= 2026 Baylor Bears football team =

American college football season

2026 Baylor Bears football
- Conference: Big 12 Conference
- Record: 6–5 (4–4 Big 12)
- Head coach: Dave Aranda (7th season; first 7 games); Joe Klanderman (inteirm; remainder of season)
- Offensive coordinator: Jake Spavital (3rd season)
- Offensive scheme: Bear raid
- Defensive coordinator: Joe Klanderman (1st season)
- Base defense: 4–2–5
- Home stadium: McLane Stadium

Uniform
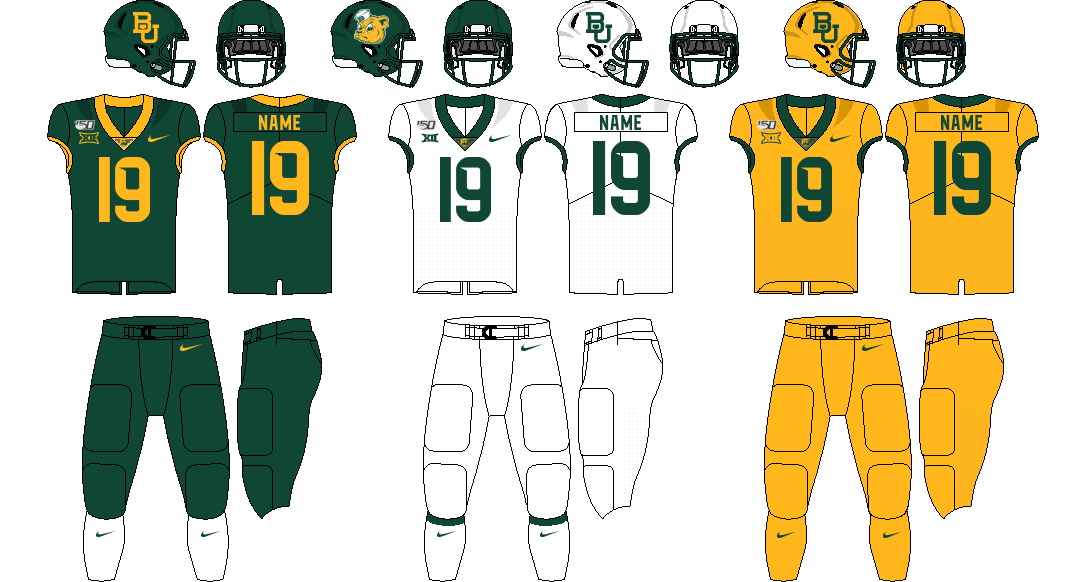

2026 Big 12 Conference football standings
	Conf.			Overall
Team	W		L	W		L
No. 2 Utah y	8	–	0	11	–	0
No. 12 Texas Tech	7	–	1	10	–	1
No. 10 BYU	6	–	2	9	–	2
No. 19 Arizona	5	–	3	8	–	3
No. 20 Houston	5	–	3	8	–	3
Oklahoma State	5	–	3	7	–	4
Baylor	4	–	4	6	–	5
Arizona State	4	–	4	6	–	5
UCF	4	–	4	6	–	5
Iowa State	3	–	5	5	–	6
TCU	3	–	5	5	–	6
Cincinnati	3	–	5	6	–	5
Kansas	2	–	6	4	–	7
West Virginia	2	–	6	5	–	6
Colorado	2	–	6	4	–	7
Kansas State	1	–	7	4	–	7
Championship: TBD vs. Utah
^ – College Football Playoff participant; $ – Conference champion; y – Championship game participant; As of November 22, 2026; Rankings from CFP rankings

The 2026 Baylor Bears football team represents Baylor University as a member of the Big 12 Conference during the 2026 NCAA Division I FBS football season. The Bears play home games at McLane Stadium located in Waco, Texas.

The Bears were led by Dave Aranda in his seventh year as their head coach for the first seven games of the season. Aranda was fired on October 25, finishing at Baylor with an overall record of 40–40; defensive coordinator Joe Klanderman was named the team's interim head coach for the remainder of the season.

== Schedule ==
Date	Time	Opponent	Site	TV	Result	Attendance
September 5	2:30 p.m.	vs. Auburn*	Mercedes-Benz Stadium; Atlanta, GA (Aflac Kickoff Game, SEC Nation)	ABC	L 16–17	55,068
September 12	7:00 p.m.	Prairie View A&M*	McLane Stadium; Waco, TX	ESPN+	W 44–3	38,642
September 19	3:00 p.m.	Louisiana Tech*	McLane Stadium; Waco, TX	ESPNU	W 36–19	41,343
September 26	11:00 a.m.	Colorado	McLane Stadium; Waco, TX	ESPN2	W 23–13	40,015
October 3	9:30 p.m.	at Arizona State	Mountain America Stadium; Tempe, AZ	ESPN	W 55–19	54,063
October 17	6:00 p.m.	TCU	McLane Stadium; Waco, TX (The Revivalry)	FS1	L 6–17	46,634
October 24	12:00 p.m.	at Kansas	David Booth Kansas Memorial Stadium; Lawrence, KS	TNT	L 24–25	32,000
October 30	6:30 p.m.	at UCF	Acrisure Bounce House; Orlando, FL	ESPN	W 41–9	45,906
November 7	11:00 a.m.	Iowa State^{†}	McLane Stadium; Waco, TX	FS1	W 42–31	39,229
November 14	6:00 p.m.	at No. 10 BYU	LaVell Edwards Stadium; Provo, UT	FOX	L 7–28	63,008
November 21	2:30 p.m.	No. 12 Texas Tech	McLane Stadium; Waco, TX (rivalry)	FOX	L 10–20	46,765
November 28	8:30 p.m.	at Houston	TDECU Stadium; Houston, TX (rivalry)	ESPN2		
*Non-conference game; ^{†}Homecoming; Rankings from AP Poll (and CFP Rankings, after November 3) – Released prior to game; All times are in Central time

== Game summaries ==
=== vs. Auburn ===
Baylor Bears (0–0) vs. Auburn Tigers (0–0) – Game summary

Quarter	1	2	3	4	Total
Bears	0	7	0	9	16
Tigers	3	7	0	7	17

at Mercedes-Benz Stadium • Atlanta, Georgia

- Date: September 5
- Game time: 2:30 p.m.
- Game weather: None (retractable roof closed)
- Game attendance: 55,068
- Referee: Tutashinda Salaam
- TV announcers (ABC): Joe Tessitore, Jesse Palmer and Taylor McGregor

Game information

First quarter

- AUB – Alex McPherson 43-yard field goal, 8:13. Tigers 3–0. Drive: 7 plays, 45 yards, 1:52.

Second quarter

- AUB – Jeremiah Cobb 15–yard run (Alex McPherson kick), 3:51. Tigers 10–0. Drive: 5 plays, 57 yards, 2:01.
- BAY – Louis Brown IV 14-yard pass from DJ Lagway (Rhett Armstrong kick), 1:30. Tigers 10–7. Drive: 9 plays, 75 yards, 2:21.

Third quarter

- No scoring plays.

Fourth quarter

- BAY – Rhett Armstrong 22-yard field goal, 7:12. Tied 10–10. Drive: 13 plays, 45 yards, 4:34.
- AUB – Byrum Brown 11–yard run (Alex McPherson kick), 3:21. Tigers 17–10. Drive: 10 plays, 75 yards, 3:50.
- BAY – Gavin Freeman 5-yard pass from DJ Lagway (pass failed), 0:09. Tigers 17–16. Drive: 14 plays, 75 yards, 3:12.

Statistics	AUB	BAY
First downs	24	27
Plays–yards	76–389	99–436
Rushes–yards	41–130	45–103
Passing yards	259	333
Passing: comp–att–int	26–35–3	27–54–1
Turnovers	3	2
Time of possession	27:28	32:32

Team	Category	Player	Statistics
Auburn	Passing	Byrum Brown	26/35, 259 yards, 3 INT
Auburn	Rushing	Jeremiah Cobb	12 carries, 53 yards, TD
Auburn	Receiving	Keshaun Singleton	7 receptions, 89 yards
Baylor	Passing	DJ Lagway	27/54, 333 yards, 2 TD, INT
Baylor	Rushing	Dawson Pendergrass	25 carries, 88 yards
Baylor	Receiving	Gavin Freeman	12 receptions, 154 yards, TD

=== vs Prairie View A&M (FCS) ===
Prairie View A&M Panthers (FCS) (1–1) at Baylor Bears (0–1) – Game summary

Quarter	1	2	3	4	Total
Panthers (FCS)	3	0	0	0	3
Bears	17	17	7	3	44

at McLane Stadium • Waco, Texas

- Date: September 12
- Game time: 7:00 p.m.
- Game weather: Clear • Temperature: 96 °F (36 °C)
- Game attendance: 38,642
- Referee: Michael McCabe
- TV announcers (ESPN+): Mark Neely and Barrett Brooks

Game information

First quarter

- PVAM – Ethan Eddins 25-yard field goal, 10:58. Aggies 3–0. Drive: 10 plays, 57 yards, 4:02.
- BAY – Rhett Armstrong 46-yard field goal, 8:20. Tied 3–3. Drive: 8 plays, 35 yards, 2:31.
- BAY – Caden Knighten 5-yard run (Rhett Armstrong kick), 4:22. Bears 10–3. Drive: 8 plays, 53 yards, 3:34.
- BAY – Jayden McGowan 33-yard pass from Nate Bennett (Rhett Armstrong kick), 0:59. Bears 17–3. Drive: 2 plays, 36 yards, 0:27.

Second quarter

- BAY – Dre'lon Miller 22-yard pass from Noah Bennett (Rhett Armstrong kick), 13:51. Bears 24–3. Drive: 3 plays, 44 yards, 1:03.
- BAY – Nate Bennett 17-yard run (Rhett Armstrong kick), 12:55. Bears 31–3. Drive: 1 play, 17 yards, 0:07.
- BAY – Rhett Armstrong 45-yard field goal, 4:10. Bears 34–3. Drive: 11 plays, 72 yards, 3:52.

Third quarter

- BAY – Jayden McGowan 13-yard run (Rhett Armstrong kick), 1:39. Bears 41–3. Drive: 11 plays, 80 yards, 5:20.

Fourth quarter

- BAY – Rhett Armstrong 22-yard field goal, 8:42. Bears 44–3. Drive: 14 plays, 63 yards, 5:26.

Statistics	PV	BAY
First downs	7	32
Plays–yards	52–110	84–552
Rushes–yards	25–36	41–219
Passing yards	74	333
Passing: comp–att–int	14–27–0	26–43–3
Turnovers	1	3
Time of possession	25:38	34:22

Team	Category	Player	Statistics
Prairie View A&M	Passing	Tevin Carter	14/25, 74 yards
Prairie View A&M	Rushing	Zayvion Turner-Knox	4 carries, 12 yards
Prairie View A&M	Receiving	Ky'Yon Harris	3 receptions, 38 yards
Baylor	Passing	Nate Bennett	24/36, 314 yards, 3 TD, 2 INT
Baylor	Rushing	Dawson Pendergrass	15 carries, 69 yards
Baylor	Receiving	Gavin Freeman	10 receptions, 104 yards

=== vs Louisiana Tech ===
Louisiana Tech Bulldogs (1-1) at Baylor Bears (1-1) – Game summary

Quarter	1	2	3	4	Total
Bulldogs	7	0	0	12	19
Bears	7	13	9	7	36

at McLane Stadium • Waco, Texas

- Date: September 19
- Game time: 3:00 p.m.
- Game weather: Sunny • Temperature: 94 °F (34 °C) • Wind: SE at 6 miles per hour (9.7 km/h)
- Game attendance: 41,343
- Referee: Rory Bernard
- TV announcers (ESPNU): Chuckie Kempf (play-by-play) and Dustin Fox (analyst)

Game information

First quarter

- BAY – Nate Bennett 25-yard run (Rhett Armstrong kick), 10:37. Bears 7–0. Drive: 10 plays, 75 yards, 4:23.
- LT – Andrew Burnette 2-yard run (Kaegan Kent kick), 3:38. Tied 7–7. Drive: 15 plays, 75 yards, 6:59.

Second quarter

- BAY – Dawson Pendergrass 1-yard run (Rhett Armstrong kick), 12:08. Bears 14–7. Drive: 13 plays, 75 yards, 6:30.
- BAY – Louis Brown IV 51-yard pass from Nate Bennett (Rhett Armstrong kick), 10:38. Bears 21–7. Drive: 1 play, 51 yards, 0:07.

Third quarter

- BAY – Jayden McGowan 43-yard pass from Nate Bennett (two-point conversion failed), 10:14. Bears 26–7. Drive: 2 plays, 55 yards, 0:46.
- BAY – Rhett Armstrong 23-yard field goal, 1:45. Bears 29–7. Drive: 5 plays, 23 yards, 2:02.

Fourth quarter

- LT – Eli Finley 19-yard pass from Trey Kukuk (two-point conversion failed), 8:18. Bears 29–13. Drive: 7 plays, 53 yards, 3:34.
- LT – Jalen Mickens 2-yard run (two-point conversion failed), 5:14. Bears 29–19. Drive: 4 plays, 47 yards, 1:20.
- BAY – Jayden McGowan 36-yard pass from Nate Bennett (Rhett Armstrong kick), 4:10. Bears 36–19. Drive: 4 plays, 47 yards, 1:03.

Statistics	LT	BAY
First downs	25	22
Total yards	362	418
Rushing yards	139	165
Passing yards	223	253
Turnovers	2	2
Time of possession	32:18	27:42

Team	Category	Player	Statistics
Louisiana Tech	Passing	Trey Kukuk	25/44, 223 yards, TD, INT
Louisiana Tech	Rushing	Trey Kukuk	11 carries, 75 yards
Louisiana Tech	Receiving	Eli Finley	8 receptions, 65 yards, TD
Baylor	Passing	Nate Bennett	21/24, 253 yards, 3 TDs
Baylor	Rushing	Ryelan Morris	4 carries, 55 yards
Baylor	Receiving	Jayden McGowan	2 receptions, 79 yards, 2 TDs

=== vs Colorado ===
Colorado Buffaloes (2–1) at Baylor Bears (2–1) – Game summary

Quarter	1	2	3	4	Total
Buffaloes	3	0	3	7	13
Bears	0	10	3	10	23

at McLane Stadium • Waco, Texas

- Date: September 26
- Game time: 11:00 a.m.
- Game weather: Cloudy • Temperature: 82 °F (28 °C)
- Game attendance: 40,015
- Referee: Stephen Baron
- TV announcers (ESPN2): Lowell Galindo, Kirk Morrison and Dawn Davenport

Game information

First quarter

- (3:22) COLO – Elliot Arnold 24-yard field goal (Drive: 7 plays, 74 yards, 2:40; Colorado 3–0)

Second quarter

- (13:28) BAY – Rhett Armstrong 37-yard field goal (Drive: 13 plays, 54 yards, 4:45; Tied 3–3)
- (7:04) BAY – Gavin Freeman 3-yard pass from DJ Lagway, Rhett Armstrong kick (Drive: 3 plays, 48 yards, 1:20; Baylor 7–3)

Third quarter

- (7:14) BAY – Rhett Armstrong 37-yard field goal (Drive: 5 plays, 38 yards, 1:19; Baylor 13–3)
- (2:17) COLO – Elliot Arnold 46-yard field goal (Drive: 6 plays, 63 yards, 2:12; Baylor 13–6)

Fourth quarter

- (11:04) COLO – Joseph Williams 17-yard pass from Isaac Wilson, Elliot Arnold kick (Drive: 12 plays, 95 yards, 4:35; Tied 13–13)
- (9:02) BAY – Jadon Porter 33-yard pass from DJ Lagway, Rhett Armstrong kick (Drive: 5 plays, 65 yards, 2:02; Baylor 20–13)
- (4:28) BAY – Rhett Armstrong 54-yard field goal (Drive: 9 plays, 43 yards, 3:36; Baylor 23–13)

Statistics	COLO	BAY
First downs	24	22
Plays–yards	81–363	74–337
Rushes–yards	39–83	35–116
Passing yards	280	221
Passing: comp–att–int	24–42–0	19–39–1
Time of possession	31:26	28:34

Team	Category	Player	Statistics
Colorado	Passing	Isaac Wilson	12/25, 156 yards, TD
Colorado	Rushing	Micah Welch	9 carries, 35 yards
Colorado	Receiving	Joseph Williams	11 receptions, 127 yards, TD
Baylor	Passing	DJ Lagway	19/39, 221 yards, 2 TD, INT
Baylor	Rushing	Dawson Pendergrass	18 carries, 85 yards
Baylor	Receiving	Gavin Freeman	6 receptions, 59 yards, TD

=== at Arizona State ===
Baylor Bears (3–1) at Arizona State Sun Devils (2–1) – Game summary

Quarter	1	2	3	4	Total
Bears	14	10	21	10	55
Sun Devils	3	10	3	3	19

at Mountain America Stadium • Tempe, Arizona

- Date: October 3
- Game time: 9:30 p.m
- Game weather: Clear • Temperature: 90 °F (32 °C) • Wind: E at 10 miles per hour (16 km/h)
- Game attendance: 54,063
- Referee: Luke Richmond
- TV announcers (ESPN): Roy Philpott (play-by-play), Brock Osweiler (analyst) and Sherree Burruss (sideline)

Game information

First quarter

- ASU – Carson Smith 46-yard field goal, 9:47. Arizona State 3–0. Drive: 9 plays, 51 yards, 3:02.
- BAY – Ryelan Morris 63-yard run (Rhett Armstrong kick), 9:13. Baylor 7–3. Drive: 2 plays, 75 yards, 0:35.
- BAY – Tony Livingston 3-yard pass from DJ Lagway (Rhett Armstrong kick), 3:01. Baylor 14–3. Drive: 9 plays, 72 yards, 3:10.

Second quarter

- BAY – Louis Brown IV 10-yard pass from DJ Lagway (Rhett Armstrong kick), 14:10. Baylor 21–3. Drive: 7 plays, 64 yards, 1:39.
- ASU – Carson Smith 32-yard field goal, 9:59. Baylor 21–6. Drive: 11 plays, 61 yards, 4:11.
- ASU – Omarion Miller 30-yard pass (Carson Smith kick), 1:51. Baylor 21–13. Drive: 5 plays, 80 yards, 0:58.
- BAY – Rhett Armstrong 36-yard field goal, 0:00. Baylor 24–13. Drive: 10 plays, 57 yards, 1:51.

Third quarter

- BAY – Hawkins Polley 3-yard pass from DJ Lagway (Rhett Armstrong kick), 11:38. Baylor 31–13. Drive: 9 plays, 77 yards, 3:16.
- BAY – Jadon Porter 8-yard pass from DJ Lagway (Rhett Armstrong kick), 9:29. Baylor 38–13. Drive: 5 plays, 40 yards, 0:59.
- ASU – Carson Smith 36-yard field goal, 4:54. Baylor 38–16. Drive: 13 plays, 64 yards, 4:40.
- BAY – Caden Knighten 75-yard run (Rhett Armstrong kick), 4:31. Baylor 45–16. Drive: 1 plays, 75 yards, 0:13.

Fourth quarter

- ASU – Carson Smith 40-yard field goal, 11:36. Baylor 45–19. Drive: 8 plays, 44 yards, 3:05.
- BAY – DJ Lagway 11-yard run (Rhett Armstrong kick), 5:58. Baylor 52–16. Drive: 10 plays, 49 yards, 5:36.
- BAY – Rhett Armstrong 23-yard field goal, 3:50. Baylor 55–19. Drive: 4 plays, 5 yards, 2:04.

Statistics	BAY	ASU
First downs	26	23
Plays–yards	79–564	74–409
Rushes–yards	36–244	30–99
Passing yards	320	310
Passing: comp–att–int	27–43–0	26–44–1
Time of possession	31:05	28:55

Team	Category	Player	Statistics
Baylor	Passing	DJ Lagway	25/40, 306 yards, 4 TD
Baylor	Rushing	Caden Knighten	6 carries, 84 yards, TD
Baylor	Receiving	Gavin Freeman	7 receptions, 115 yards
Arizona State	Passing	Cutter Boley	25/43, 304 yards, TD, INT
Arizona State	Rushing	Cardae Mack	5 carries, 34 yards
Arizona State	Receiving	Reed Harris	7 receptions, 125 yards

=== vs TCU (The Revivalry) ===
TCU Horned Frogs (2–3) at Baylor Bears (4–1) – Game summary

Quarter	1	2	3	4	Total
Horned Frogs	7	0	10	0	17
Bears	0	6	0	0	6

at McLane Stadium • Waco, Texas

- Date: October 17
- Game time: 6:00 p.m.
- Game weather: Clear • Temperature: 65 °F (18 °C)
- Game attendance: 46,634
- Referee: Henry Johns
- TV announcers (FS1): Eric Collins (play-by-play) and Spencer Tillman (analyst)
- Box Score

Game information

First quarter

- TCU – Ed Small 25-yard pass from Jaden Craig (Nate McCashland kick), 6:14. Horned Frogs 7–0. Drive: 9 plays, 57 yards, 3:20.

Second quarter

- BAY – Rhett Armstrong 39-yard field goal, 9:02. Horned Frogs 7–3. Drive: 14 plays, 66 yards, 3:52.
- BAY – Rhett Armstrong 32-yard field goal, 3:18. Horned Frogs 7–6. Drive: 12 plays, 39 yards, 3:39.

Third quarter

- TCU – Ka'Morreun Pimpton 8-yard pass from Jaden Craig (Nate McCashland kick), 14:16. Horned Frogs 14–6. Drive: 3 plays, 75 yards, 0:44.
- TCU – Nate McCashland 25-yard field goal, 6:01. Horned Frogs 17–6. Drive: 14 plays, 73 yards, 6:26.

Fourth quarter

- No scoring plays

Statistics	TCU	BAY
First downs	18	23
Plays–yards	66–327	87–310
Rushes–yards	30–33	34–54
Passing yards	294	256
Passing: comp–att–int	21–36–1	22–53–1
Time of possession	31:36	28:24

Team	Category	Player	Statistics
TCU	Passing	Jaden Craig	21/36, 294 yards, 2 TD, INT
TCU	Rushing	Landon Walker	6 carries, 36 yards
TCU	Receiving	Jordan Dwyer	6 receptions, 150 yards
Baylor	Passing	DJ Lagway	22/53, 256 yards, INT
Baylor	Rushing	Caden Knighten	10 carries, 35 yards
Baylor	Receiving	Gavin Freeman	7 receptions, 76 yards

=== at Kansas ===
Baylor Bears (4–2) at Kansas Jayhawks (2–4) – Game summary

Quarter	1	2	3	4	Total
Bears	7	0	14	3	24
Jayhawks	7	0	3	15	25

at David Booth Kansas Memorial Stadium • Lawrence, Kansas

- Date: October 24
- Game time: 12:00 p.m.
- Game attendance: 32,000
- TV announcers (TNT/TruTV): J. B. Long, Mike Golic Jr., and Allie LaForce

Game information
First quarter
- KU – Carson Bruhn 22-yard pass from Isaiah Marshall (Martin Connington kick), 6:03. Jayhawks 7–0. Drive: 11 plays, 66 yards, 5:01.
- BAY – Dawson Pendergrass 1-yard run (Rhett Armstrong kick), 3:29. Tied 7–7. Drive: 6 plays, 39 yards, 2:24.

Second quarter

- No scoring plays

Third quarter

- BAY – Devon Jordan 42-yard interception return (Rhett Armstrong kick), 13:29. Bears 14–7.
- KU – Martin Connington 40-yard field goal, 10:30. Bears 14–10. Drive: 6 plays, 50 yards, 2:52.
- BAY – Jayden McGowan 8-yard pass from DJ Lagway (Rhett Armstrong kick), 6:41. Bears 21–10. Drive: 7 plays, 72 yards, 3:49.

Fourth quarter

- KU – Nik McMillan 34-yard pass from Isaiah Marshall (run failed), 14:53. Bears 21–16. Drive: 12 plays, 75 yards, 6:48.
- KU – Martin Connington 42-yard field goal, 9:45. Bears 21–19. Drive: 10 plays, 42 yards, 3:36.
- BAY – Rhett Armstrong 42-yard field goal, 2:40. Bears 24–19. Drive: 6 plays, 15 yards, 2:18.
- KU – Isaiah Marshall 15-yard run (pass failed), 1:13. Jayhawks 25–24. Drive: 6 plays, 71 yards, 1:20.

Statistics	BAY	KU
First downs	16	24
Plays–yards	66–358	86–421
Rushes–yards	35–122	56–209
Passing yards	236	212
Passing: comp–att–int	20–31–1	17–30–2
Time of possession	23:19	36:41

Team	Category	Player	Statistics
Baylor	Passing	DJ Lagway	20/31, 236 yards, TD, INT
Baylor	Rushing	DJ Lagway	11 carries, 47 yards
Baylor	Receiving	Gavin Freeman	9 receptions, 123 yards
Kansas	Passing	Isaiah Marshall	17/29, 212 yards, 2 TD, 2 INT
Kansas	Rushing	Dylan Edwards	30 carries, 156 yards
Kansas	Receiving	Nik McMillan	2 receptions, 66 yards, TD

=== at UCF ===
Baylor Bears (4–3) at UCF Knights (4–3) – Game summary

Quarter	1	2	3	4	Total
Bears	7	13	14	7	41
Knights	0	6	3	0	9

at Acrisure Bounce House • Orlando, Florida

- Date: October 30
- Game time: 6:30 p.m.
- Game weather: Cloudy • Temperature: 80 °F (27 °C) • Wind: NE at 11 miles per hour (18 km/h)
- Game attendance: 45,906
- Referee: Michael VanderVelde
- TV announcers (ESPN): Mike Monaco, Jordan Rodgers, and Dana Boyle

Game information

First quarter

- BAY – Tony Livingston 4-yard pass from DJ Lagway (Rhett Armstrong Kick), 4:06, Bears 7–0. Drive: 7 plays, 46 yards, 3:08.

Second quarter

- BAY – Caden Knighten 2-yard run (Rhett Armstrong Kick), 8:58, Bears 14–0. Drive: 8 plays, 63 yards, 3:21.
- UCF – Will Stone 39-yard field goal, 3:24, Bears 14–3. Drive: 11 plays, 54 yards, 5:34.
- BAY – Rhett Armstrong 45-yard field goal, 1:44, Bears 17–3. Drive: 5 plays, 58 yards, 1:34.
- BAY – Rhett Armstrong 29-yard field goal, 0:28, Bears 20–3. Drive: 5 plays, 43 yards, 0:52.
- UCF – Will Stone 57-yard field goal, 0:00, Bears 20–6. Drive: 4 plays, 36 yards, 0:28.

Third quarter

- BAY – Tony Livingston 21-yard pass from DJ Lagway (Rhett Armstrong Kick), 10:07, Bears 27–6. Drive: 4 plays, 63 yards, 1:26.
- BAY – Gavin Freeman 77-yard pass from DJ Lagway (Rhett Armstrong Kick), 8:29, Bears 34–6. Drive: 3 plays, 77 yards, 0:25.
- UCF – Will Stone 35-yard field goal, 6:24, Bears 34–9. Drive: 5 plays, 58 yards, 2:05.

Fourth quarter

- BAY – Matthew Klopfenstein 5-yard pass from DJ Lagway (Rhett Armstrong Kick), 12:33, Bears 41–9. Drive: 4 plays, 35 yards, 1:37.

Statistics	BAY	UCF
First downs	19	14
Plays–yards	67–503	67–281
Rushes–yards	42–184	30–66
Passing yards	319	215
Passing: comp–att–int	16–25–0	22–37–1
Time of possession	29:08	30:52

Team	Category	Player	Statistics
Baylor	Passing	DJ Lagway	16/25, 319 yards, 4 TD
Baylor	Rushing	Ryelan Morris	11 carries, 82 yards
Baylor	Receiving	Gavin Freeman	5 receptions, 114 yards, TD
UCF	Passing	Alonza Barnett III	8/16, 133 yards
UCF	Rushing	Rocco Marriott	2 carries, 50 yards
UCF	Receiving	Josh Derry	3 receptions, 70 yards

=== vs Iowa State ===
Iowa State Cyclones (4–4) at Baylor Bears (5–3) – Game summary

Quarter	1	2	3	4	Total
Cyclones	10	7	0	14	31
Bears	0	21	14	7	42

at McLane Stadium • Waco, Texas

- Date: November 7
- Game time: 11:00 a.m.
- Game attendance: 39,229
- TV announcers (FS1): Eric Collins and Spencer Tillman

Statistics	ISU	BAY
First downs		
Plays–yards		
Rushes–yards		
Passing yards		
Passing: comp–att–int		
Time of possession		

Team	Category	Player	Statistics
Iowa State	Passing		
Iowa State	Rushing		
Iowa State	Receiving		
Baylor	Passing		
Baylor	Rushing		
Baylor	Receiving		

=== at No. 10 BYU ===
Baylor Bears (6–3) at No. 10 BYU Cougars (7–2) – Game summary

Quarter	1	2	3	4	Total
Bears	0	0	0	7	7
No. 10 Cougars	14	7	0	7	28

at LaVell Edwards Stadium • Provo, Utah

- Date: November 14
- Game time: 6:00 p.m.
- Game weather: Cloudy • Temperature: 45 °F (7 °C) • Wind: SW 3 mph (4.8 km/h)
- Game attendance: 63,008
- Referee: Luke Richmond
- TV announcers (FOX): Jack Kizer and Mark Helfrich

Game information

First quarter

- BYU – 9:14 Bear Bachmeier 8-yard run (Matthias Dunn kick). BYU 7–0. Drive: 9 plays, 58 yards, 4:07.
- BYU – 0:10 Bear Bachmeier 5-yard run (Matthias Dunn kick). BYU 14–0. Drive: 12 plays, 86 yards, 6:54.

Second quarter

- BYU – 1:40 Bear Bachmeier 1-yard run (Matthias Dunn kick). BYU 21–0. Drive: 18 plays, 96 yards, 9:03.

Third quarter
Fourth quarter

- BAY – 11:18 Matthew Klopfenstein 3-yard pass from DJ Lagway (Rhett Armstrong kick). BYU 21–7. Drive: 8 plays, 73 yards, 2:10.
- BYU – 6:43 Jojo Phillips 23-yard pass from Bear Bachmeier (Matthias Dunn kick). BYU 28–7. Drive: 3 plays, 26 yards, 0:54.

Statistics	BAY	BYU
First downs	16	22
Plays–yards	60–238	72–312
Rushes–yards	23–79	47–189
Passing yards	159	123
Passing: comp–att–int	21–37–1	15–25–0
Time of possession	22:59	37:01

Team	Category	Player	Statistics
Baylor	Passing	DJ Lagway	21/37, 159 yards, TD, INT
Baylor	Rushing	DJ Lagway	11 carries, 42 yards
Baylor	Receiving	Jadon Porter	5 receptions, 50 yards
BYU	Passing	Bear Bachmeier	14/24, 104 yards, TD
BYU	Rushing	Bear Bachmeier	15 carries, 54 yards, 3 TD
BYU	Receiving	Walker Lyons	3 receptions, 49 yards

=== vs No. 12 Texas Tech (rivalry) ===
No. 12 Texas Tech Red Raiders (9–1) at Baylor Bears (6–4) – Game summary

Quarter	1	2	3	4	Total
No. 12 Red Raiders	7	0	7	6	20
Bears	0	7	0	3	10

at McLane Stadium • Waco, Texas

- Date: November 21
- Game time: 2:30 p.m.
- Referee: Hank Johns
- TV announcers (Fox): Jack Kizer and Mark Helfrich

Game information
First quarter
- TTU – J'Koby Williams 1-yard run (Stone Harrington kick), 4:28. Red Raiders 7–0. Drive: 8 plays, 73 yards, 3:41.

Second quarter

- BAY – Matthew Klopfenstein 3-yard pass from DJ Lagway (Rhett Armstrong kick), 8:12. Tied 7–7. Drive: 7 plays, 26 yards, 2:33.

Third quarter

- TTU – Malcolm Simmons 48-yard pass from Tommy Castellanos (Stone Harrington kick), 6:15. Red Raiders 14–7. Drive: 7 plays, 88 yards, 3:05.

Fourth quarter

- TTU – Stone Harrington 34-yard field goal, 10:47. Red Raiders 17–7. Drive: 10 plays, 65 yards, 5:42.
- BAY – Rhett Armstrong 24-yard field goal, 8:05. Red Raiders 17–10. Drive: 7 plays, 68 yards, 2:42.
- TTU – Stone Harrington 39-yard field goal, 2:34. Red Raiders 20–10. Drive: 4 plays, 6 yards, 0:22.

Statistics	TTU	BAY
First downs	16	15
Total yards	402	267
Rushing yards	231	31
Passing yards	171	236
Turnovers	3	0
Time of possession	32:06	27:54

Team	Category	Player	Statistics
Texas Tech	Passing	Tommy Castellanos	10/16, 171 yards, TD, 2 INT
Texas Tech	Rushing	J'Koby Williams	21 rushes, 117 yards, TD
Texas Tech	Receiving	Malcolm Simmons	4 receptions, 61 yards, TD
Baylor	Passing	DJ Lagway	30/48, 236 yards, TD
Baylor	Rushing	Ryelan Morris	8 rushes, 20 yards
Baylor	Receiving	Tony Linvingston	4 receptions, 47 yards

=== at Houston ===
Baylor Bears (6–5) at Houston Cougars (8–3) – Game summary

Quarter	1	2	Total
Bears			0
Cougars			0

at TDECU Stadium • Houston, Texas

- Date: November 28

Statistics	BAY	HOU
First downs		
Plays–yards		
Rushes–yards		
Passing yards		
Passing: comp–att–int		
Time of possession		

Team	Category	Player	Statistics
Baylor	Passing		
Baylor	Rushing		
Baylor	Receiving		
Houston	Passing		
Houston	Rushing		
Houston	Receiving		

== Personnel ==
=== Coaching staff ===
Name	Position	Seasons at Baylor
Dave Aranda	Head coach	7th
Khenon Hall	Associate head coach and running backs coach	3rd
Joe Klanderman	Defensive coordinator and safeties coach	1st
Jake Spavital	Offensive coordinator and quarterbacks coach	3rd
Mark Scott	Special teams coordinator	3rd
Jarrett Anderson	Tight ends coach	3rd
Dallas Baker	Wide receivers coach	5th
Jamar Chaney	Linebackers coach	3rd
Jacori Greer	Defensive line coach	1st
Carson Hall	Defensive ends coach	2nd
Jeremy Modkins	Cornerbacks coach	1st
Austin Woods	Offensive line coach	2nd
Rhett Holcomb	Assistant quarterbacks coach	2nd
David Orloff	Assistant nickels coach	1st
Ryan Pollard	Assistant special teams coach	4th
Craig Watts	Assistant offensive line coach	4th
Jeff Grigus	Chief of staff	4th

=== Roster ===
2026 Baylor Bears football team roster
Players
Coaches
Offense

Pos.	#	Name	Class
WR	1	Dre'lon Miller	Jr
QB	2	DJ Lagway	Jr
WR	3	Jadon Porter	Jr
WR	4	Louis Brown IV	5th
WR	6	Gavin Freeman	5th
TE	10	Tony Livingston	Sr
RB	11	Caden Knighten	So
QB	12	Nate Bennett	So
QB	13	Quinn Murphy	Fr
QB	14	Edward Griffin	So
WR	15	Jayden McGowan	5th
WR	16	London Smith	Fr
QB	17	Cade Tessier	Jr
WR	18	Taz Williams Jr.	So
WR	20	Jacorey Watson	So
RB	23	Michael Turner	So
RB	25	Ryelan Morris	Fr
WR	32	Brody Day	So
RB	33	HD Davis	Fr
WR	34	Davion Peters	Fr
RB	35	Dawson Pendergrass	Sr
TE	43	Brody Wilhelm	So
TE	46	Parker Almanza	Fr
OL	55	Cooper Lovelace
OL	56	Harrison Cluff	So
OL	57	Journey Tala	So
OL	61	Cayden Tone	Jr
OL	62	Alessandro Lorenzetti	Sr
OL	63	Wyatt Swaner	So
OL	64	Jaydon Mendiola	So
OL	66	Koltin Sieracki	So
OL	67	David Roberts Jr.	So
OL	69	Donel Robinson Jr.	Fr
OL	70	Nate Kibble	So
OL	71	Matthew Parker	So
OL	72	Asher Hale	Jr
OL	73	Keystone Allison	Jr
OL	74	Kaden Sieracki	Sr
OL	75	Muyont'a Maxwell	Jr
OL	76	Lawson Petty	Jr
OL	77	Logan Moore	Jr
OL	78	Cole Rhett	Jr
OL	79	Connor Cameron	So
WR	80	Jackson Baird	So
WR	81	Ryne Shackelford	Jr
WR	83	DeBraun Hampton	Jr
WR	84	Chase Collier	So
TE	85	Matthew Klopfenstein	Sr
TE	86	Hawkins Polley	Jr
WR	87	Ashton Jones	So
TE	88	Kai Wesley	Fr
WR	89	Michael Johnson Jr.	Jr

Defense

Pos.	#	Name	Class
DL	0	Hosea Wheeler	Sr
LB	5	Travion Barnes	5th
CB	7	Devon Jordan	Jr
S	8	Jacob Redding	Jr
JACK	9	Ryan Davis	Sr
LB	10	Kyland Reed	Jr
S	11	Devin Turner	5th
CB	12	Kyler Beaty	So
JACK	13	Garrick Ponder	Sr
S	14	Daniel Cobbs	Jr
S	15	Colby McCalister	Sr
S	17	Tyler Turner	Jr
S	19	Leo Almanza Jr.	So
S	21	Bo Onu	So
CB	22	Reggie Bush II	Sr
CB	23	Stilton McKelvey	Sr
S	24	Micah Gifford	Sr
CB	25	Levar Thornton Jr.	Jr
S	26	Colin Peacock	So
CB	27	Jayden Rowe	Sr
CB	28	Calvin Simpson-Hunt	Jr
S	29	Jordan Davis	Fr
S	30	Michael Allen	Sr
LB	31	Anthony Crenshaw Jr.	Sr
S	32	Austin Ausberry	Sr
CB	33	Kalique Cheeves	So
CB	34	Daniel Edeni	So
LB	36	Kedrick Walker	Sr
S	37	Demetrius Brisbon	So
CB	38	Jamarion Richardson	Fr
S	39	Cole Redding	Fr
DE	40	Kyler Jordan	Sr
LB	41	Kaleb Burns	So
LB	42	Jamarion Phillips	Fr
LB	44	JJ Shelton	So
LB	46	Jahiem Porter	Fr
S	48	Jad Darkazalli	So
LB	49	Trey Laurence	Jr
DL	52	Aleki Manutai	Jr
DE	53	Daemian Wimberly	Jr
DL	54	Jae'Lin Battle	Fr
JACK	55	Jaylin Jones	Jr
LB	56	Kaleb Arterberry	So
DE	57	Christopher Johnson	So
DL	59	Devonte Tezino	Sr
DL	90	Braylen Jackson	Sr
DL	91	Traevon Mitchell	5th
DE	92	Trent Thomas	Jr
DE	93	Zavion Hardy	Sr
JACK	94	Tyrone Morgan	Fr
DL	96	Kamren Washington	Sr
DE	97	Jordan Mack	Sr
DL	98	Jackson Blackwell	So
DL	99	Jamaal Whyce Jr.	Sr

Special teams

Pos.	#	Name	Class
LS	93	Dylan Schaub	Jr
P	94	Palmer Williams	Sr
K	96	Riley Sullivan	Jr
K, P	97	Bronson Mueller	Fr
K	98	Rhett Armstrong	So

Head coach

- Dave Aranda

Coordinators/assistant coaches

- Khenon Hall
  Associate Head Coach and Running Backs Coach
- Joe Klanderman
  Defensive Coordinator and Safeties
- Jake Spavital
  Offensive Coordinator and Quarterbacks
- Mark Scott
  Special Teams Coordinator
- Jarrett Anderson
  Tight Ends
- Dallas Baker
  Wide Receivers
- Jamar Chaney
  Linebackers
- Jacori Greer
  Defensive Line
- Carson Hall
  Defensive Ends
- Jeremy Modkins
  Cornerbacks
- Austin Woods
  Offensive Line
- Rhett Holcomb
  Assistant Quarterbacks
- David Orloff
  Assistant Nickels
- Ryan Pollard
  Assistant Special Teams
- Craig Watts
  Assistant Offensive Line
- Jeff Grigus
  Chief of Staff

Legend

- (C) Team captain
- (S) Suspended
- (I) Ineligible
- Injured
- Redshirt

Roster

=== Transfers ===
==== Transfers in ====
Player	Pos	Class	Height	Weight	Previous school
Logan Moore	OT	RS-SO	6'7"	255 lbs	UAB
Stilton McKelvey	CB	JR	6'0"	175 lbs	New Mexico State
Devon Jordan	CB	SO	5'10.5"	170 lbs	Oklahoma
Kamren Washington	DL	RS-SR	6'1"	260 lbs	Texas State
Nate Kibble	IOL	RS-FR	6'2.5"	315 lbs	Texas
Asher Hale	OT	SO	6'5"	305 lbs	South Alabama
Jamaal Whyce	DL	RS-JR	6'3"	323 lbs	Marshall
JJ Shelton	LB	FR	6'1"	190 lbs	Arkansas
Ryan Davis	EDGE	RS-SO	6'4"	230 lbs	Kansas State
DJ Lagway	QB	SO	6'2.5"	230 lbs	Florida
DeBraun Hampton	WR	SO	5'10"	184 lbs	Florida
Jayden Rowe	CB	RS-JR	6'3"	210 lbs	Kansas State
Garrick Ponder	LB	RS-JR	6'0"	175 lbs	Southern Miss
Cole Rhett	OT	RS-SO	6'6"	290 lbs	Toledo
Colby McCalister	S	RS-JR	5'11"	175 lbs	Kansas State
Zavion Hardy	DL	JR	6'5"	260 lbs	South Carolina
Daniel Cobbs	S	RS-SO	5'10"	188 lbs	Kansas State
Daemian Wimberly	DL	RS-SO	6'4"	245 lbs	UTSA
Dre'lon Miller	WR	SO	5'11.5"	205 lbs	Colorado
Kedrick Walker	LB	JR	6'3"	225 lbs	Georgia State
Gavin Freeman	WR	SR	5'10"	170 lbs	Oklahoma State
Yakiri Walker	IOL	RS-SR	6'3"	270 lbs	Memphis
Jordan Mack	DL	JR	6'6"	270 lbs	Coastal Carolina
Lawson Petty	IOL	RS-SO	6'4"	300 lbs	Incarnate Word
Austin Ausberry	S	RS-JR	6'0"	196 lbs	LSU
Anthony Crenshaw	S	JR	5'11"	170 lbs	Delaware
Tony Livingston	TE	RS-JR	6'4"	225 lbs	Florida
Hosea Wheeler	DL	RS-SR	6'3"	300 lbs	Indiana
Cooper Lovelace	IOL	RS-SR	6'5"	320 lbs	Colorado
Jayden McGowan	WR	SR	5'9"	170 lbs	Charlotte
Traevon Mitchell	DL	SR	6'0"	265 lbs	South Florida
Cole Redding	S	FR	5'10"	187 lbs	Harding
Riley Sullivan	K	RS-SO	6'4"	205 lbs	Campbell

==== Transfers out ====
Player	Pos	Class	Height	Weight	New School
Tonga Lolohea	DL	RS-SR	6'5"	325 lbs	Undecided
Ke'Breion Winston	LB	FR	6'0.5"	200 lbs	Undecided
Joseph Hagman	RB	RS-SO	6'1"	225 lbs	TCU
KJ Makins	CB	SR	5'9"	165 lbs	Lenoir–Rhyne
Wes Tucker	IOL	RS-SO	6'5"	250 lbs	Abilene Christian
Seth Weller	WR	SR	6'3"	204 lbs	Abilene Christian
Keaton Thomas	LB	SR	6'2"	210 lbs	Ole Miss
DJ Coleman	S	JR	6'0"	180 lbs	Florida
Coleton Price	IOL	RS-JR	6'3"	280 lbs	Kentucky
DK Kalu	DL	RS-SO	6'3"	270 lbs	Florida
Colton Thomasson	IOL	RS-SO	6'8"	347 lbs	UNLV
Matthew Fobbs-White	EDGE	JR	6'3"	235 lbs	Virginia
Cameren Jenkins	CB	JR	6'1"	165 lbs	North Texas
Phoenix Jackson	LB	RS-SR	6'0"	220 lbs	Arkansas
Caden Jenkins	CB	JR	6'1"	165 lbs	North Texas
Jeremy Evans	LB	RS-JR	6'1"	213 lbs	Arkansas
Kristopher Wokomah	S	SO	5'10.5"	175 lbs	UAB
Emar'rion Winston	EDGE	RS-JR	6'3"	240 lbs	Arizona State
Bryson Washington	RB	RS-SO	6'0"	185 lbs	Auburn
Joe Crocker	OT	RS-SO	6'6"	318 lbs	Buffalo
Walker White	QB	SO	6'3"	225 lbs	Central Arkansas
LaKelsey Johnson Jr.	TE	SR	6'2"	220 lbs	Liberty
Carl Williams	CB	JR	5'11"	170 lbs	Oregon
Joseph Dodds	RB	RS-FR	5'11"	195 lbs	Stephen F. Austin
Drake Knobloch	LS	RS-JR	6'3"	235 lbs	Northwest Missouri State
Connor Hawkins	K	RS-FR	6'2"	185 lbs	Ohio State
MJ Artmore	CB	RS-SO	6'0"	191 lbs	Stephen F. Austin
Sean Thompkins	IOL	RS-SO	6'6"	310 lbs	LSU
Mason Dossett	WR	RS-FR	6'1"	170 lbs	LSU
Samu Taumanupepe	DL	RS-SO	6'3"	375 lbs	Colorado
Caldra Williford	CB	SR	5'9"	156 lbs	Tulsa
Corey Kelly	LB	RS-SO	6'2"	202 lbs	Kennesaw State
Ronnie Mageo	DL	RS-JR	6'5"	282 lbs	Utah State
Kamauryn Morgan	EDGE	FR	6'3.5"	230 lbs	Missouri
Ka'Marii Landers	OL	RS-JR	6'4"	289 lbs	Concord
