= 2026 TCU Horned Frogs football team =

American college football season

2026 TCU Horned Frogs football
- Conference: Big 12 Conference
- Record: 5–6 (3–5 Big 12)
- Head coach: Sonny Dykes (5th season; first 11 games); Andy Avalos (interim; final game)
- Offensive coordinator: Gordon Sammis (1st season)
- Co-offensive coordinator: A. J. Ricker (5th season; first 7 games)
- Offensive scheme: Spread
- Defensive coordinator: Andy Avalos (3rd season)
- Base defense: 4–2–5
- Home stadium: Amon G. Carter Stadium

2026 Big 12 Conference football standings
	Conf.			Overall
Team	W		L	W		L
No. 2 Utah y	8	–	0	11	–	0
No. 12 Texas Tech	7	–	1	10	–	1
No. 10 BYU	6	–	2	9	–	2
No. 19 Arizona	5	–	3	8	–	3
No. 20 Houston	5	–	3	8	–	3
Oklahoma State	5	–	3	7	–	4
Baylor	4	–	4	6	–	5
Arizona State	4	–	4	6	–	5
UCF	4	–	4	6	–	5
Iowa State	3	–	5	5	–	6
TCU	3	–	5	5	–	6
Cincinnati	3	–	5	6	–	5
Kansas	2	–	6	4	–	7
West Virginia	2	–	6	5	–	6
Colorado	2	–	6	4	–	7
Kansas State	1	–	7	4	–	7
Championship: TBD vs. Utah
^ – College Football Playoff participant; $ – Conference champion; y – Championship game participant; As of November 22, 2026; Rankings from CFP rankings

The 2026 TCU Horned Frogs football team represents Texas Christian University (TCU) as a member of the Big 12 Conference during the 2026 NCAA Division I FBS football season. They are led by Sonny Dykes in his fifth year as their head coach. The Horned Frogs play their home games at Amon G. Carter Stadium located in Fort Worth, Texas.

The Horned Frogs were led by fifth-year head coach Sonny Dykes for the first 11 games of the season. Dykes was fired with one game remaining in the regular season. Defensive coordinator Andy Avalos was named interim head coach for the Horned Frogs' regular season finale.

== Transfers ==
Incoming

Name	Pos.	Height	Weight	Hometown	Prev. school
Kalen Carroll	CB	5'11"	161	Brownsburg, IN	Central Michigan
Teon Parks	CB	6'1"	180	Detroit, MI	Colorado
Landon Walker	RB	6'2"	225	Keller, TX	Colorado Mines
Jaheim Buchanon	IOL	6'2"	280	Lehigh Ares, FL	FIU
Jaden Craig	QB	6'3"	225	Montclair, NJ	Harvard
John Hoyet Chance	P	6'1"	205	Shreveport, LA	Louisiana Tech
Jacob Fields	CB	5'11"	170	Melissa, TX	Louisiana Tech
Noah McKinney	IOL	6'3"	245	Henderson, NV	Oklahoma State
Jeremy Scott	WR	6'4"	185	Jackson, MS	South Alabama
Cheta Ofili	EDGE	6'4"	211	Sachse, TX	Texas Tech
Michael Short	LB	6'3"	218	Charlotte, NC	Virginia Tech
Koron Hayward	LB	6'4.5"	199	Jacksonville, FL	Western Kentucky

Outgoing

Name	Pos.	Height	Weight	Hometown	New school
Cam Jamerson	CB	6'0.5"	170	Houston, TX	Boise State
Quinton Harris	OT	6'7"	285	Arlington, TX	Colorado State
Jonathan Bax	LB	6'2"	228	New Orleans, LA	Florida Atlantic
Cal Keeler	LS	6'2"	200	Phoenix, AZ	Georgia Tech
Josh Hoover	QB	6'1"	205	Rockwall, TX	Indiana
Jordyn Bailey	WR	5'9"	160	Denton, TX	Iowa State
Jonah Martinez	CB	6'1"	180	Mission Hills, CA	Southern Miss
Rasheed Jackson	OT	6'7"	350	Chicago, IL	Texas State
Rohon Kazadi	S	6'2"	190	Plano, TX	Tulsa
Avery Helm	CB	6'2"	170	Missouri City, TX	UNLV
Nate Palmer	RB	5'10"	180	Decatur, TX	Wisconsin
Gekyle Baker	WR	6'2"	170	Brownsboro, TX	TBA
Derrick Carroll	RB	6'1"	230	Memphis, TN	TBA
Elijah Jackson	CB	6'1"	195	Carson, CA	TBA
Ka'Morreun Pimpton	TE	6'6"	250	Fort Worth, TX	Withdrawn

== Roster ==
2026 TCU Horned Frogs football team roster
Players
Coaches
Offense

Pos.	#	Name	Class
WR	0	Dozie Ezukanma	So
QB	1	Jaden Craig	GS
RB	2	Jon Denman	So
WR	3	Major Everhart	Sr
WR	4	Ace Theus	Fr
WR	6	Jeremy Scott	So
QB	6	Jayden Maples	Fr
WR	7	Jordan Dwyer	Sr
QB	9	Jack Daulton	Fr
QB	11	Adam Schobel	Fr
TE	12	Lafayette Kaiuway	Jr
QB	12	David Potter	Fr
WR	15	Terry Shelton	Fr
WR	16	Braylon James	Jr
WR	17	Dane Jones	Fr
WR	18	Ed Small	So
WR	22	Fletcher Fierro	So
RB	24	Joe Pitchford	So
RB	26	Jeremy Payne	Jr
RB	27	Landon Walker	GS
OL	50	Witten Van Hoy	So
OL	51	Devan Robinson	Fr
OL	53	Tobias Steppes	So
OL	56	Ben Taylor-Whitfield	Sr
OL	57	Samir Camacho	So
OL	58	Noah McKinney	Sr
OL	59	Jaheim Buchanon	Jr
OL	60	Cade Bennett	GS
OL	61	Dylan Kinney	Sr
OL	65	Logan Schram	Fr
OL	66	Wesley Harvey	So
OL	69	Gannon Gaubert	Sr
OL	70	Ryan Hughes	So
OL	71	Creece Brister	Fr
OL	72	Jackson Jones	Fr
OL	73	Kilian Registe	Fr
OL	74	Vincent Johnson Jr.	Fr
OL	77	Cooper Powers	Jr
WR	80	Jacobe Hayes	So
TE	81	Kari Ashley	Jr
WR	83	Keagan Cunningham	GS
WR	84	Cooper Reid	Fr
WR	85	James Scott	Fr
WR	86	Sutton Lee	Sr
TE	87	Mason Peterson	So
TE	88	Ka'Morreun Pimpton	Jr
TE	89	Braden Bach	Fr

Defense

Pos.	#	Name	Class
E	0	Zachary Chapman	Jr
CB	1	Vernon Glover	Jr
S	2	Jamel Johnson	Sr
LB	3	Max Carroll	Jr
CB	4	Gil Jackson	So
S	6	Kylin Jackson	Jr
S	7	Julius Simms	So
E	9	Chad Woodfork	Fr
S	10	Jacob Fields	Sr
LB	11	Michael Short	Sr
E	12	Travis Jackson	So
CB	12	Kalen Carroll	Sr
S	13	Ryan Yaites	Sr
E	14	John Schobel	Fr
S	15	Devyn Hidrogo	So
CB	16	Brock King	Fr
CB	17	Devondre McGee	Jr
S	18	Kaden McFadden	Jr
E	19	Jesse Ford	Fr
LB	20	Anthony Williams	Fr
CB	21	Teon Parks	Sr
S	22	Jordan Lester	Jr
LB	23	Keylan Abrams	Fr
S	24	Joseph Albright	Fr
S	25	Zach Taylor	Fr
CB	26	Deon Mays	Fr
LB	27	Michael Teason	Jr
CB	28	Micah Strickland	Fr
LB	31	Noriel Dominguez	Fr
LB	32	Dillon Arkansas	Fr
E	33	Koron Hayward	Jr
DT	34	Perry Cole Jr.	Jr
DT	35	Tristan Johnson	So
E	36	Cheta Ofili	So
LB	37	Hudson Hooper	Jr
LB	41	Caleb Cortez	Jr
S	42	Sebastian Peterson	So
LB	44	Sam Haley	Fr
LB	46	Rhett Steppe	So
E	49	Anders Corn	Fr
DT	52	Blake Robinett	Fr
E	55	Lawson Watkins	Fr
DT	59	Maddox Flynt	Fr
DT	90	Kelten Mickell	Jr
DT	91	Floyd Guidry	Fr
DT	92	Ansel Din-Mbuh	Sr
DT	93	Brody Whatley	Fr
E	94	Jared Martin	Fr
DT	95	Markis Deal	Jr
DT	96	Duncan McGhee	Fr
E	97	Paul Oyewale	Jr
E	98	Carter Buck	Fr
DT	99	Connor Lingren	Jr

Special teams

Pos.	#	Name	Class
K	34	Kyle Lemmermann	So
K	41	Sam Bisesi	Fr
LS	43	Will Terry	Fr
LS	47	Aaron Bowers	Sr
P	48	John Hoyet Chance	So
P	97	Easton Black	Sr
K	99	Nate McCashland	Jr

Head coach

- Sonny Dykes

Coordinators/assistant coaches

- Andy Avalos (defensive coordinator)
- Gordon Sammis (offensive coordinator)
- Malcolm Kelly (assistant head coach/wide receivers)
- A. J. Ricker (co-offensive coordinator/offensive line)
- Tre Watson (passing game coordinator/safeties)
- Benny Boyd (cornerbacks)
- Mitch Kirsch (run game coordinator / tight ends)
- Jamarkus McFarland (defensive line)
- Brad Robbins (quarterbacks)
- Antonio Wilcox (running backs)
- Ken Wilson (linebackers)
- Mark Tommerdahl (special assistant to the head coach)

Legend

- (C) Team captain
- (S) Suspended
- (I) Ineligible
- Injured
- Redshirt

Roster
Last update: June 18, 2026

== Schedule ==
Date	Time	Opponent	Site	TV	Result	Attendance
August 29	11:00 a.m.	vs. North Carolina*	Aviva Stadium; Dublin, Ireland (Aer Lingus College Football Classic)	ESPN	L 10–15	40,457
September 12	7:00 p.m.	Grambling State*	Amon G. Carter Stadium; Fort Worth, TX	ESPN+	W 63–7	37,600
September 19	7:00 p.m.	Arkansas State*	Amon G. Carter Stadium; Fort Worth, TX	ESPNU	W 31–7	46,139
September 26	2:30 p.m.	at UCF	Acrisure Bounce House; Orlando, FL	FS1	L 13–21	43,212
October 3	6:00 p.m.	No. 10 BYU	Amon G. Carter Stadium; Fort Worth, TX	ESPN	L 10–17	38,327
October 17	6:00 p.m.	at Baylor	McLane Stadium; Waco, TX (rivalry)	FS1	W 17–6	46,634
October 24	11:00 a.m.	West Virginia^{†}	Amon G. Carter Stadium; Fort Worth, TX	ESPN2	L 20–24	36,216
October 31	2:30 p.m.	Kansas	Amon G. Carter Stadium; Fort Worth, TX	FS1	W 22–16	32,549
November 6	9:15 p.m.	at No. 22 Arizona	Casino Del Sol Stadium; Tucson, AZ	ESPN	L 28–29	40,501
November 14	1:00 p.m.	Kansas State	Amon G. Carter Stadium; Fort Worth, TX	ESPNU	W 20–10	37,203
November 21	8:00 p.m.	No. 2 Utah	Amon G. Carter Stadium; Fort Worth, TX	FOX	L 17–38	36,906
November 26	7:00 p.m.	at Texas Tech	Galaxy Stadium; Lubbock, TX (rivalry)	ESPN		
*Non-conference game; ^{†}Homecoming; Rankings from AP Poll (and CFP Rankings, after November 3) – Released prior to game; All times are in Central time

== Game summaries ==
=== vs. North Carolina (Aer Lingus College Football Classic) ===
North Carolina Tar Heels (0–0) vs. TCU Horned Frogs (0–0) – Game summary

Quarter	1	2	3	4	Total
Tar Heels	10	2	3	0	15
Horned Frogs	10	0	0	0	10

at Aviva Stadium • Dublin, Ireland

- Date: August 29
- Game time: 11:00 a.m. CDT / 5:00 p.m. IST
- Game weather: Sunny • Temperature: 65 °F (18 °C) • Wind: S at 4 miles per hour (6.4 km/h)
- Game attendance: NA
- Referee: Mike Roche
- TV announcers (ESPN): Mike Monaco, Jordan Rodgers and Dana Boyle
- Box Score

Game information

First quarter

- UNC – Aeron Burrell 20-yard field goal, 10:07. Tar Heels 3–0. Drive: 10 plays, 73 yards, 4:53.
- TCU – Kyle Lemmermann 31-yard field goal, 7:20. Tied 3–3. Drive: 7 plays, 62 yards, 2:47.
- TCU – Jon Denman 2-yard run (Kyle Lemmermann kick), 4:00. Horned Frogs 10–3. Drive: 4 plays, 25 yards, 1:41.
- UNC – Jaylen McGill 9-yard run (Aeron Burrell kick), 1:04. Tied 10–10. Drive: 7 plays, 70 yards, 2:56.

Second quarter

- UNC – John Hoyet Chance kick out of own end zone, 1:49. Tar Heels 12–10.

Third quarter

- UNC – Aeron Burrell 28-yard field goal, 10:04. Tar Heels 15–10. Drive: 5 plays, 21 yards, 1:34.

Fourth quarter

- No scoring plays.

Statistics	UNC	TCU
First downs	20	17
Plays–yards	57–322	71–281
Rushes–yards	29–90	39–106
Passing yards	232	175
Passing: comp–att–int	16–28–0	20–32–0
Turnovers	2	1
Time of possession	26:58	33:02

Team	Category	Player	Statistics
North Carolina	Passing	Billy Edwards Jr.	16/28, 232 yards
North Carolina	Rushing	Benjamin Hall	11 carries, 36 yards
North Carolina	Receiving	Jelani Thurman	4 receptions, 94 yards
TCU	Passing	Jaden Craig	20/32, 172 yards
TCU	Rushing	Jeremy Payne	25 carries, 142 yards
TCU	Receiving	Ed Small	9 receptions, 65 yards

=== Grambling State (FCS) ===
Grambling State Tigers (FCS) (1–0) at TCU Horned Frogs (0–1) – Game summary

Quarter	1	2	3	4	Total
Tigers (FCS)	0	7	0	0	7
Horned Frogs	7	21	14	21	63

at Amon G. Carter Stadium • Fort Worth, Texas

- Date: September 12
- Game time: 7:00 p.m. CDT
- Game weather: Sunny • Temperature: 100 °F (38 °C) • Wind: SE at 12 miles per hour (19 km/h)
- Game attendance: 37,600
- Referee: Dan Scanlan
- TV announcers (ESPN+): James Westling and Craig Haubert

Game information

First quarter

- TCU – Major Everhart 8-yard run (Nate McCashland kick), 12:21. Horned Frogs 7–0. Drive: 6 plays, 78 yards, 2:33.

Second quarter

- TCU – Jon Denman 1-yard run (Nate McCashland kick), 10:53. Horned Frogs 14–0. Drive: 6 plays, 45 yards, 2:34.
- TCU – Ka'Morreun Pimpton 9-yard pass from Jaden Craig (Nate McCashland kick), 8:26. Horned Frogs 21–0. Drive: 5 plays, 66 yards, 1:21.
- GRAM – Byron Eaton Jr. 7-yard pass from Reginald Johnson (Theodore Caballero kick), 4:25. Horned Frogs 21–7. Drive: 8 plays, 91 yards, 3:56.
- TCU – Joe Pitchford 1-yard run (Nate McCashland kick), 1:48. Horned Frogs 28–7. Drive: 7 plays, 76 yards, 2:31.

Third quarter

- TCU – Kari Ashley 29-yard pass from Jaden Craig (Nate McCashland kick), 9:23. Horned Frogs 35–7. Drive: 3 plays, 65 yards, 1:11.
- TCU – Jeremy Scott 52-yard pass from Jaden Craig (Nate McCashland kick), 2:20. Horned Frogs 42–7. Drive: 1 play, 42 yards, 0:33.

Fourth quarter

- TCU – Kari Ashley 15-yard pass from Jaden Craig (Nate McCashland kick), 12:23. Horned Frogs 49–7. Drive: 8 plays, 70 yards, 2:55.
- TCU – Teon Parks 67-yard interception return (Nate McCashland kick), 9:52. Horned Frogs 56–7.
- TCU – Amante Martin 10-yard run (Nate McCashland kick), 3:24. Horned Frogs 63–7. Drive: 8 plays, 70 yards, 4:12.

Statistics	GRAM	TCU
First downs	7	33
Plays–yards	53–210	59–676
Rushes–yards	28–20	37–285
Passing yards	190	391
Passing: comp–att–int	14–25–2	24–32–0
Turnovers	2	1
Time of possession	30:26	29:34

Team	Category	Player	Statistics
Grambling State	Passing	Reginald Johnson	14/20, 190 yards, TD
Grambling State	Rushing	Jamarion Parker	5 carries, 9 yards
Grambling State	Receiving	Jordan Bride	4 receptions, 79 yards
TCU	Passing	Jaden Craig	24/31, 391 yards, 4 TD
TCU	Rushing	Jeremy Payne	9 carries, 79 yards
TCU	Receiving	Kari Ashley	7 receptions, 119 yards, 2 TD

=== Arkansas State ===
Arkansas State Red Wolves (1-1) at TCU Horned Frogs (1-1) – Game summary

Quarter	1	2	3	4	Total
Red Wolves	0	7	0	0	7
Horned Frogs	7	7	7	10	31

at Amon G. Carter Stadium • Fort Worth, Texas

- Date: September 19
- Game time: 7:00 p.m. CDT
- Game weather: Sunny • Temperature: 96 °F (36 °C) • Wind: SE 11 mph
- Game attendance: 46,139
- Referee: Luke Richmond
- TV announcers (ESPNU): Ted Emrich (play-by-play) and Fozzy Whittaker (analyst)

Game information

First quarter

- TCU – Jeremy Payne 3-yard run (Nate McCashland kick), 8:36. Horned Frogs 7–0. Drive: 10 plays, 76 yards, 4:51.

Second quarter

- TCU – Ed Small 17-yard pass from Jaden Craig (Nate McCashland kick), 5:10. Horned Frogs 14–0. Drive: 5 plays, 77 yards, 2:24.
- ARST – Ezell Jolly 1-yard run (Clune Van Andel kick), 1:05. Horned Frogs 14–7. Drive: 4 plays, 84 yards, 0:44.

Third quarter

- TCU – Ka'Morreun Pimpton 9-yard pass from Jaden Craig (Nate McCashland kick), 0:17. Horned Frogs 21–7. Drive: 14 plays, 99 yards, 8:00.

Fourth quarter

- TCU – Nate McCashland 29-yard field goal, 8:36. Horned Frogs 24–7. Drive: 11 plays, 78 yards, 6:54.
- TCU – Kari Ashley 29-yard pass from Jaden Craig (Nate McCashland kick), 1:52. Horned Frogs 31–7. Drive: 4 plays, 33 yards, 2:12.

Statistics	ARST	TCU
First downs	11	21
Plays–yards	54-261	68-468
Rushes–yards	30-128	39-131
Passing yards	133	337
Passing: comp–att–int	11-24-0	21-29-1
Time of possession	25:26	34:34

Team	Category	Player	Statistics
Arkansas State	Passing	Trey Owens	11/24, 133 yards
Arkansas State	Rushing	Trey Owens	7 carries, 58 yards
Arkansas State	Receiving	Hunter Summers	3 receptions, 47 yards
TCU	Passing	Jaden Craig	21/29, 337 yards, 3 TDs, INT
TCU	Rushing	Jeremy Payne	24 carries, 86 yards, TD
TCU	Receiving	Ed Small	7 receptions, 164 yards, TD

=== at UCF ===
TCU Horned Frogs (2–1) at UCF Knights (2–1) – Game summary

Quarter	1	2	3	4	Total
Horned Frogs	7	3	3	0	13
Knights	7	7	0	7	21

at Acrisure Bounce House • Orlando, Florida

- Date: September 26
- Game time: 2:30 p.m. CDT
- Game weather: Sunny • Temperature: 82 °F (28 °C) • Wind: N at 6 miles per hour (9.7 km/h)
- Game attendance: 43,212
- Referee: Michael VanderVeld
- TV announcers (FS1): Dan Hellie and Robert Smith

Game information

First quarter

- UCF – Taevion Swint 13-yard run (Will Stone kick), 10:27 Knights 7–0. Drive: 6 plays, 43 yards, 3:39.
- TCU – Jeremy Payne 1-yard run (Nate McCashland kick), 6:48 Tied 7–7. Drive: 7 plays, 75 yards, 3:39.

Second quarter

- TCU – Nate McCashland 29-yard field goal, 8:30, Horned Frogs 10–7. Drive: 9 plays, 41 yards, 3:13.
- UCF – Caden Piening 19-yard pass from Keyone Jenkins (Will Stone Kick), 4:58, Knights 14–10. Drive: 7 plays, 75 yards, 3:32.

Third quarter

- TCU – Nate McCashland 45-yard field goal, 3:25, Knights 14–13. Drive: 15 plays, 50 yards, 9:45.

Fourth quarter

- UCF – Landen Chambers 1-yard run (Will Stone kick), 12:25 Knights 21–13. Drive: 11 plays, 75 yards, 6:00.

Statistics	TCU	UCF
First downs	18	17
Plays–yards	67–343	53–266
Rushes–yards	27–33	33–106
Passing yards	310	160
Passing: comp–att–int	25–40–2	19–20–0
Time of possession	32:49	27:11

Team	Category	Player	Statistics
TCU	Passing	Jaden Craig	25/40, 310 yards, 2 INT
TCU	Rushing	Jeremy Payne	15 carries, 48 yards, TD
TCU	Receiving	Jordan Dwyer	5 receptions, 100 yards
UCF	Passing	Keyone Jenkins	19/20, 160 yards, TD
UCF	Rushing	Duke Watson	13 carries, 57 yards
UCF	Receiving	Josh Derry	3 receptions, 41 yards

=== No. 10 BYU ===
No. 10 BYU Cougars (3–0) at TCU Horned Frogs (2–2) – Game summary

Quarter	1	2	3	4	Total
No. 10 Cougars	0	7	3	7	17
Horned Frogs	0	7	0	3	10

at Amon G. Carter Stadium • Fort Worth, Texas

- Date: October 3
- Game time: 6:00 p.m. CDT
- Game weather: Rain • Temperature: 72 °F (22 °C) • Wind: N 8 mph (13 km/h)
- Game attendance: 38,327
- Referee: Cravonne Barrett
- TV announcers (ESPN): Tom Hart, Roddy Jones, and Quint Kessenich

Game information

First quarter

No scoring plays

Second quarter

- BYU – 7:52 Bear Bachmeier 9-yard run (Matthias Dunn kick). BYU 7–0. Drive: 6 plays, 16 yards, 2:57.
- TCU – 0:27 Kari Ashley 13-yard reception from Jaden Craig (Nate McCashland kick). TIED 7–7. Drive: 8 plays, 76 yards, 3:29.

Third quarter

- BYU – 7:34 Matthias Dunn 49-yard Field Goal. BYU 10–7. Drive: 10 plays, 32 yards, 6:00.

Fourth quarter

- BYU – 2:06 Bear Bachmeier 21-yard run (Matthias Dunn kick). BYU 17–7. Drive: 10 plays, 72 yards, 5:55.
- TCU – 0:32 Nate McCashland 44-yard Field Goal. BYU 17–10. Drive: 8 plays, 51 yards, 1:26.

Statistics	BYU	TCU
First downs	15	14
Plays–yards	62–216	55–259
Rushes–yards	38–154	30–72
Passing yards	62	187
Passing: comp–att–int	11–24–0	18–25–1
Time of possession	32:57	27:03

Team	Category	Player	Statistics
BYU	Passing	Bear Bachmeier	11/24, 62 yards
BYU	Rushing	Bear Bachmeier	15 carries, 66 yards, 2 TD
BYU	Receiving	Kyler Kasper	2 receptions, 22 yards
TCU	Passing	Jaden Craig	18/25, 187 yards, TD, INT
TCU	Rushing	Jeremy Payne	14 carries, 77 yards
TCU	Receiving	Kari Ashley	6 receptions, 108 yards, TD

=== At Baylor (The Revivalry) ===
TCU Horned Frogs (2–3) at Baylor Bears (4–1) – Game summary

Quarter	1	2	3	4	Total
Horned Frogs	7	0	10	0	17
Bears	0	6	0	0	6

at McLane Stadium • Waco, Texas

- Date: October 17
- Game time: 6:00 p.m.
- Game weather: Clear • Temperature: 65 °F (18 °C)
- Game attendance: 46,634
- Referee: Henry Johns
- TV announcers (FS1): Eric Collins (play-by-play) and Spencer Tillman (analyst)

Game information

First quarter

- TCU – Ed Small 25-yard pass from Jaden Craig (Nate McCashland kick), 6:14. Horned Frogs 7–0. Drive: 9 plays, 57 yards, 3:20.

Second quarter

- BAY – Rhett Armstrong 39-yard field goal, 9:02. Horned Frogs 7–3. Drive: 14 plays, 66 yards, 3:52.
- BAY – Rhett Armstrong 32-yard field goal, 3:18. Horned Frogs 7–6. Drive: 12 plays, 39 yards, 3:39.

Third quarter

- TCU – Ka'Morreun Pimpton 8-yard pass from Jaden Craig (Nate McCashland kick), 14:16. Horned Frogs 14–6. Drive: 3 plays, 75 yards, 0:44.
- TCU – Nate McCashland 25-yard field goal, 6:01. Horned Frogs 17–6. Drive: 14 plays, 73 yards, 6:26.

Fourth quarter

- No scoring plays

Statistics	TCU	BAY
First downs	18	23
Plays–yards	66–327	87–310
Rushes–yards	30–33	34–54
Passing yards	294	256
Passing: comp–att–int	21–36–1	22–53–1
Time of possession	31:36	28:24

Team	Category	Player	Statistics
TCU	Passing	Jaden Craig	21/36, 294 yards, 2 TD, INT
TCU	Rushing	Landon Walker	6 carries, 36 yards
TCU	Receiving	Jordan Dwyer	6 receptions, 150 yards
Baylor	Passing	DJ Lagway	22/53, 256 yards, INT
Baylor	Rushing	Caden Knighten	10 carries, 35 yards
Baylor	Receiving	Gavin Freeman	7 receptions, 76 yards

=== West Virginia ===
West Virginia Mountaineers (4–3) at TCU Horned Frogs (3–3) – Game summary

Quarter	1	2	3	4	Total
Mountaineers	3	7	7	7	24
Horned Frogs	7	3	10	0	20

at Amon G. Carter Stadium • Fort Worth, Texas

- Date: October 24
- Game time: 11:00 a.m.
- Game weather: Sunny
- Game attendance: 36,216
- TV announcers (ESPN2): Chuckie Kempf, Dustin Fox, and Laura Steckells

Statistics	WVU	TCU
First downs	17	29
Plays–yards	58–265	82–484
Rushes–yards	43–186	35–112
Passing yards	79	372
Passing: comp–att–int	7–15–1	33–47–1
Time of possession	22:24	37:36

Team	Category	Player	Statistics
West Virginia	Passing	Michael Hawkins Jr.	7/15, 79 yards, TD, INT
West Virginia	Rushing	Cam Cook	18 carries, 90 yards
West Virginia	Receiving	Prince Strachan	2 receptions, 24 yards
TCU	Passing	Jaden Craig	33/47, 372 yards, TD, INT
TCU	Rushing	Jon Denman	15 carries, 58 yards
TCU	Receiving	Kari Ashley	6 receptions, 118 yards

=== Kansas ===
Kansas Jayhawks (3–4) at TCU Horned Frogs (3–4) – Game summary

Quarter	1	2	3	4	Total
Jayhawks	3	10	0	3	16
Horned Frogs	0	0	14	8	22

at Amon G. Carter Stadium • Fort Worth, Texas

- Date: October 31
- Game time: 2:30 p.m.
- Game attendance: 32,549
- TV announcers (FS1): Carlo Jimenez and Spencer Tillman

Statistics	KU	TCU
First downs	20	19
Plays–yards	81–451	57–286
Rushes–yards	46–166	28–145
Passing yards	285	141
Passing: comp–att–int	20–35–1	13–29–0
Time of possession	38:57	21:03

Team	Category	Player	Statistics
Kansas	Passing	Cole Ballard	20/35, 285 yards, TD, INT
Kansas	Rushing	Keaton Kubecka	3 carries, 58 yards
Kansas	Receiving	Nahzae Cox	5 receptions, 145 yards
TCU	Passing	Jaden Craig	13/29, 141 yards
TCU	Rushing	Jaden Craig	15 carries, 87 yards, TD
TCU	Receiving	Kari Ashley	3 receptions, 50 yards

=== At No. 22 Arizona ===
TCU Horned Frogs (4–4) at No. 22 Arizona Wildcats (6–2) – Game summary

Quarter	1	2	3	4	Total
Horned Frogs	0	14	7	7	28
No. 22 Wildcats	10	0	7	12	29

at Casino Del Sol Stadium • Tucson, Arizona

- Date: November 6
- Game time: 9:15 p.m. CDT / 7:15 p.m. MST
- TV announcers (ESPN): Anish Shroff, Andre Ware, and Morgan Uber

Statistics	TCU	ARIZ
First downs	22	21
Plays–yards	62–281	70–441
Rushes–yards	21–49	33–128
Passing yards	232	313
Passing: comp–att–int	28–41–1	24–37–1
Time of possession	28:02	31:58

Team	Category	Player	Statistics
TCU	Passing	Jaden Craig	28/41, 232 yards, TD, INT
TCU	Rushing	Amante Martin	8 carries, 35 yards
TCU	Receiving	Kari Ashley	14 receptions, 95 yards
Arizona	Passing	Noah Fifita	24/37, 313 yards, 2 TD, INT
Arizona	Rushing	Kedrick Reescano	10 carries, 52 yards
Arizona	Receiving	Giovanni Richardson	11 receptions, 171 yards

=== Kansas State ===
Kansas State Wildcats (4–5) at TCU Horned Frogs (4–5) – Game summary

Quarter	1	2	3	4	Total
Wildcats	0	0	10	0	10
Horned Frogs	7	3	7	3	20

at Amon G. Carter Stadium • Fort Worth, Texas

- Date: November 14
- Game time: 1:00 p.m.
- TV: ESPNU

Statistics	KSU	TCU
First downs	17	18
Plays–yards	58–302	69–324
Rushes–yards	25–58	35–99
Passing yards	244	225
Passing: comp–att–int	22–33–0	20–34–0
Time of possession	28:05	31:55

Team	Category	Player	Statistics
Kansas State	Passing	Dillon Duff	22/33, 244 yards, TD
Kansas State	Rushing	Joe Jackson	5 carries, 33 yards
Kansas State	Receiving	Jaron Tibbs	8 receptions, 115 yards, TD
TCU	Passing	Jaden Craig	20/34, 225 yards, TD
TCU	Rushing	Jeremy Payne	15 carries, 55 yards
TCU	Receiving	Jordan Dwyer	5 receptions, 85 yards

=== No. 2 Utah ===
No. 2 Utah Utes (10–0) at TCU Horned Frogs (5–5) – Game summary

Quarter	1	2	3	4	Total
No. 2 Utes	0	0	0	0	0
Horned Frogs	0	0	0	0	0

at Amon G. Carter Stadium • Fort Worth, Texas

- Date: November 21
- Game time: 8:00 p.m.
- TV announcers (FOX): Connor Onion, Robert Griffin III, and Alexa Landestoy

Statistics	UTAH	TCU
First downs		
Plays–yards		
Rushes–yards		
Passing yards		
Passing: comp–att–int		
Time of possession		

Team	Category	Player	Statistics
Utah	Passing		
Utah	Rushing		
Utah	Receiving		
TCU	Passing		
TCU	Rushing		
TCU	Receiving		

=== At Texas Tech ===
TCU Horned Frogs (0–0) at Texas Tech Red Raiders (0–0) – Game summary

Quarter	1	2	3	4	Total
Horned Frogs	0	0	0	0	0
Red Raiders	0	0	0	0	0

at Galaxy Stadium • Lubbock, Texas

- Date: November 26
- Game time: 7:00 p.m. CST
- TV: ESPN

Statistics	TCU	TTU
First downs		
Plays–yards		
Rushes–yards		
Passing yards		
Passing: comp–att–int		
Time of possession		

Team	Category	Player	Statistics
TCU	Passing		
TCU	Rushing		
TCU	Receiving		
Texas Tech	Passing		
Texas Tech	Rushing		
Texas Tech	Receiving		
