= Nate Bennett (quarterback) =

American football player (born 2005)

No. 12 – Baylor Bears
- Position: Quarterback
- Class: Junior

Personal information
- Born: August 31, 2005 (age 21)
- Listed height: 6 ft 1 in (1.85 m)
- Listed weight: 192 lb (87 kg)

Career information
- High school: Oaks Christian (Westlake Village, California)
- College: Baylor (2024–present)
- Stats at ESPN

Nate Christopher Bennett (born August 31, 2005) is an American college football quarterback for the Baylor Bears.

== Early life ==
Bennett attended Oaks Christian School in Westlake Village, California. A three-star recruit, he committed to Baylor University to play college football.

== College career ==
Bennett saw limited playing time during his first two seasons at Baylor, serving as the backup to Sawyer Robertson. He entered the 2026 season as the backup to Florida transfer DJ Lagway. After Lagway sustained an injury in the Bears' season opener, Bennett was named the starter for Baylor's second game of the season against Prairie View A&M. In his first career start, he threw for 314 yards and three touchdowns with two interceptions, while also rushing for a touchdown in a 44–3 rout.

=== Statistics ===
Season	Team	Games			Passing								Rushing			
Season	Team	GP	GS	Record	Comp	Att	Pct	Yards	Avg	TD	Int	Rate	Att	Yards	Avg	TD
2024	Baylor	3	0	–	1	2	50.0	19	9.5	0	0	129.8	–	–	–	–
2025	Baylor	2	0	–	5	7	71.4	34	4.9	0	0	112.2	–	–	–	–
2026	Baylor	2	2	2–0	45	60	75.0	567	9.4	6	2	180.4	6	15	2.5	2
Career		7	2	2−0	51	69	73.9	620	8.2	6	2	172.3	6	15	2.5	2
