= Joe Klanderman =

American football coach

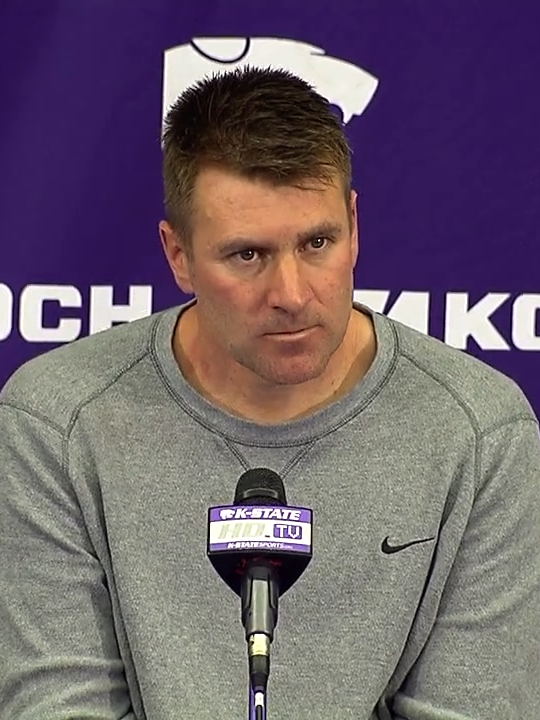
- Klanderman in 2022

Current position
- Title: Interim head coach
- Team: Baylor
- Conference: Big 12
- Record: 2–2

Biographical details
- Born: 1978 or 1979 (age 47–48); Hammond, Wisconsin, U.S.

Playing career
- 1997–2001: Minnesota State
- Position: Defensive line

Coaching career (HC unless noted)
- 2002–2004: Minnesota State (DL)
- 2005–2006: Minnesota State (DB)
- 2007–2013: Minnesota State (DC/LB)
- 2014–2018: North Dakota State (DB)
- 2019: Kansas State (S)
- 2020–2025: Kansas State (DC/S)
- 2026–present: Baylor (DC/S/interim HC)

Head coaching record
- Overall: 2–2

Accomplishments and honors

Championships
- 4× NCAA Division I FCS (2014, 2015, 2017, 2018)

Joe Klanderman (born 1978 or 1979) is an American football coach who is currently the interim head coach at Baylor University. He previously served as an assistant coach at both Kansas State University and North Dakota State University.

== Early life ==
Joe Klanderman was born in 1978 or 1979 and grew up in Hammond, Wisconsin, where he attended St. Croix Central High School.

== Coaching career ==
=== Minnesota State ===
After playing on the defensive line for the Minnesota State Mavericks from 1997 until 2001, Klanderman began his coaching career at his alma mater in 2002 as the team’s defensive line coach. In 2005 he changed the position he coached, and began coaching the defensive backs. In 2007 he was promoted to the team’s defensive coordinator while also coaching the linebackers a position he held until the end of the 2013 season.

=== North Dakota State ===
In 2014 he joined the reigning FCS champions, the North Dakota State Bison as the team’s defensive backs coach. During his five year tenure in North Dakota, the Bison won four FCS championships and his defensive backs room collected over one hundred interceptions.

=== Kansas State ===
In 2019 Klanderman followed Chris Klieman to Manhattan, Kansas and became Kansas State’s safeties coach. On March 2, 2020 he was promoted and given the reins over the defense as the team’s defensive coordinator while retaining his role in the secondary coaching the safeties.

== Personal life ==
Klanderman and his wife, Amanda, are the parents of four children.

== Head coaching record ==
Year	Team	Overall	Conference	Standing	Bowl/playoffs
Baylor Bears (Big 12 Conference) (2026–present)
2026	Baylor	2–2 (Note: Klanderman was named interim head coach for the remainder of the 2026 season after Dave Aranda was fired after seven games)	2–2		
Baylor:		2–2	2–2		
Total:		2–2			
