= Jeremy Modkins =

American football player and coach (born 1982)

Current position
- Title: Cornerbacks Coach
- Team: Baylor
- Conference: Big 12

Biographical details
- Born: May 18, 1982 (age 44); Marlin, Texas, U.S.
- Education: TCU

Playing career
- 2001–2005: TCU
- 2006: Cleveland Browns
- 2006: Green Bay Packers

Coaching career (HC unless noted)
- 2007–2008: TCU (GA)
- 2014–2017: TCU (defensive analyst)
- 2018–2021: TCU (CB)
- 2022: Minnesota Vikings (defensive assistant)
- 2023–2026: Rice (CB)
- 2026–present: Baylor (CB)

Accomplishments and honors

Awards
- Second-team All-MW (2005)

Jeremy Modkins (born May 18, 1982) is an American football coach and former player. He is the cornerbacks coach for Baylor University, a position he has held since 2026.

== Early life ==
Modkins was born and raised in Marlin, Texas, where he played quarterback at Marlin High School, from which he graduated in 2001.

== Playing career ==
After enrolling at Texas Christian University in 2001, Modkins redshirted in his first season on campus. He then became a four-year letterman for the Horned Frogs, starting 35 games at safety in his career that included helping lead TCU to two conference titles, one in Conference USA (2002) and the other in the Mountain West Conference (2005). As a senior, Modkins tallied 67 tackles and three interceptions to earn 2nd team All-MWC and team Defensive MVP honors. His final collegiate game came in a 27–24 victory over Iowa State in the 2005 Houston Bowl, a week after he graduated from TCU with a degree in communications.

After going undrafted in the 2006 NFL draft, Modkins spent time on the roster of both the Cleveland Browns and Green Bay Packers.

== Coaching career ==
Modkins' first coaching job came as a graduate assistant at TCU during the 2007 and 2008 seasons, during which he earned a master's degree.

After spending several years in private business, Modkins returned to coaching at TCU when Gary Patterson hired him as a defensive analyst in 2014. He was promoted to cornerbacks coach in 2018, and that fall helped TCU corner Jeff Gladney earned 2nd team All-Big 12 honors.

== Personal life ==
His older brother is Curtis Modkins, who also starred at both Marlin and TCU and is currently a Running Backs / Running Game Coordinator for the Minnesota Vikings.
