= Ryder Lyons =

American football player (born 2007)

Folsom High School
- Position: Quarterback

Personal information
- Listed height: 6 ft 3 in (1.91 m)
- Listed weight: 220 lb (100 kg)

Career information
- High school: Folsom (Folsom, California)
- Stats at ESPN

George Ryder Lyons II is an American high-school football quarterback. He is committed to play college football for the BYU Cougars.

== Early life ==
Lyons is the grandson of director Kieth Merrill and the brother of football player Walker Lyons. Lyons attends Folsom High School in Folsom, California. As a sophomore in 2023, he was named The Sacramento Bee Player of the Year after completing 259 of 381 passes for 3,578 yards with 38 touchdowns and rushing for 929 yards with 23 touchdowns. As a junior in 2024, he was the Gatorade Football Player of the Year for California after completing 211 of 310 passes for 3,011 yards with 46 touchdowns and adding 585 rushing yards and 14 touchdowns.

A five-star recruit, Lyons committed to Brigham Young University after receiving 33 offers from schools around the country. Lyons is one of the top quarterbacks and overall recruits in the 2026 class.

In addition to playing football, he also played varsity basketball during his sophomore and junior years. He also excelled at it, as in his junior year, he was ranked 11th in the state. He wore jersey numbers #1 and #33, respectively.

== College career ==
ESPN has rated him 56th on the ESPN JR 300.
