= Legend Glasker =

American football player

No. 1 – BYU Cougars
- Position: Wide receiver
- Class: Freshman

Personal information
- Listed height: 6 ft 1 in (1.85 m)
- Listed weight: 175 lb (79 kg)

Career information
- High school: Lehi (Lehi, Utah)
- College: BYU (2026–present)
- Stats at ESPN

Legend Glasker is an American college football wide receiver for the BYU Cougars.

== Early life ==
Glasker attended Mountain Ridge High School in Herriman, Utah before transferring to Lehi High School in Lehi, Utah prior to his junior year. He was a two-time state MVP and had 113 receptions for 2,151 yards and 25 touchdowns during his career. He committed to Brigham Young University (BYU) to play college football.

== College career ==
Glasker competed for immediate playing time as a true freshman at BYU in 2026. In his first career game he had three receptions for 65 yards with two touchdowns and also added 16 rushing yards with a touchdown. In his second game Glasker was relatively quiet until the fourth quarter when he had 3 receptions for 74 yards. The third reception, a 61-yard reception, led to BYU's final touchdown on the next play in a 28–17 win.

== Personal life ==
His second cousin, Isaiah Glasker, also plays at BYU.
