= Kyler Kasper =

American football player

No. 3 – BYU Cougars
- Position: Wide receiver
- Class: Redshirt Junior

Personal information
- Listed height: 6 ft 6 in (1.98 m)
- Listed weight: 212 lb (96 kg)

Career information
- High school: Williams Field (Gilbert, Arizona)
- College: Oregon (2022–2025); BYU (2026–present)
- Stats at ESPN

Kyler Kasper is an American football wide receiver for the BYU Cougars. He previously played for the Oregon Ducks.

== Early life ==
Kasper attended Williams Field High School in Gilbert, Arizona. He committed to play college football for the Oregon Ducks over offers from Iowa, Notre Dame, Tennessee, Ohio State, and UCLA.

== College career ==
In four seasons at Oregon from 2022 to 2025, Kasper battled injuries, appearing in 23 games, notching six receptions for 77 yards. After the 2025 season, he entered the NCAA transfer portal.

Kasper transferred to play for the BYU Cougars. In week 2 of the 2026 season, he hauled in four passes for 51 yards and two touchdowns in a victory versus Arizona. In week 7, Kasper threw a 15-yard touchdown to quarterback Bear Bachmeier in an upset win over #2 Notre Dame.

== Personal life ==
Kasper's father is former Iowa and NFL wide receiver, Kevin Kasper.
