= Jaden Craig =

American football player

No. 1 – TCU Horned Frogs
- Position: Quarterback
- Class: Graduate Student

Personal information
- Listed height: 6 ft 3 in (1.91 m)
- Listed weight: 230 lb (104 kg)

Career information
- High school: Seton Hall Preparatory (West Orange, New Jersey)
- College: Harvard (2022–2025); TCU (2026–present)

Awards and highlights
- First-team All-Ivy League (2025); Second-team All-Ivy League (2024)
- Stats at ESPN

Jaden Craig is an American football quarterback for the TCU Horned Frogs. He previously played for the Harvard Crimson.

== Early life ==
Craig grew up in Montclair, New Jersey, and attended Seton Hall Preparatory School. As a junior, he completed 71 of 120 pass attempts for 794 yards and ten touchdowns. Craig committed to play college football at Harvard.

== College career ==
Craig did not play in any games during his freshman season. He started the final three games of his sophomore season and passed for 775 yards and four touchdowns and also rushed for 135 yards and seven touchdowns. Craig was named second team All-Ivy League after passing for 2,430 yards with 23 passing touchdowns and three interceptions as a junior. During his senior season, he set set a new school record for career touchdown passes. Craig was named first-team All-Ivy League after passing for 2,869 passing yards with 25 touchdown passes and seven interceptions. After the end of the season Craig entered the NCAA transfer portal.

Craig transferred to TCU for his final season of collegiate eligibility.

=== College statistics ===
Season	Team	Games			Passing								Rushing			
Season	Team	GP	GS	Record	Cmp	Att	Pct	Yds	Avg	TD	Int	Rtg	Att	Yds	Avg	TD
2023	Harvard	7	4	3–0	58	97	59.8	775	8.0	4	2	136.4	64	135	2.1	7
2024	Harvard	10	10	8–2	169	279	60.6	2,430	8.7	23	3	158.8	38	-19	-0.5	1
2025	Harvard	11	11	9–2	208	338	61.5	2,869	8.5	25	7	153.1	48	78	1.6	3
2026	TCU	10	10	5–5	223	344	64.8	2,664	7.7	13	7	138.0	83	117	1.4	4
		38	35	25–9	658	1,058	62.2	8,738	8.3	65	19	148.3	233	311	1.3	15
