= Walker Lyons =

American football player (born 2004)

No. 7 – BYU Cougars
- Position: Tight end
- Class: Junior

Personal information
- Born: March 13, 2004 (age 22)
- Listed height: 6 ft 4 in (1.93 m)
- Listed weight: 245 lb (111 kg)

Career information
- High school: Folsom (Folsom, California)
- College: USC (2024–2025); BYU (2026–present)
- Stats at ESPN

Walker Lyons (born March 13, 2004) is an American football tight end for the BYU Cougars. He previously played for the USC Trojans.

== Early life ==
Lyons grew up in Folsom, California and attended Folsom High School. As a junior, he recorded 42 receptions for 646 yards and seven touchdowns, while also contributing with the defense and special teams. He would suffer a season-ending injury in the first game of his senior year. He was then selected to the 2022 Preseason MaxPreps California All-State Team. In January 2023, Lyons was named the All-American Bowl's Man of the Year. He would originally commit to play college football at Stanford before changing his commitment to play for USC.

== College career ==
Lyons opted to postpone playing college football to serve a two-year mission for The Church of Jesus Christ of Latter-day Saints in Norway, where he would start in early 2023. He would return to play for the USC Trojans in 2024.

During his true freshman season in 2024, he played in 11 games and started three of them, finishing the season with six catches for 36 yards.

== Personal life ==
Lyons is the grandson of director Kieth Merrill and is the older brother of Ryder Lyons. He started dating professional dancer Rylee Arnold on October 20, 2024.
