= Ed Small (American football) =

American football player (born 2006)

No. 18 – TCU Horned Frogs
- Position: Wide receiver
- Class: Sophomore

Personal information
- Born: June 9, 2006 (age 20)
- Listed height: 6 ft 0 in (1.83 m)
- Listed weight: 205 lb (93 kg)

Career information
- High school: Anderson (Austin, Texas)
- College: TCU (2025–present)
- Stats at ESPN

Ed Small (born June 9, 2006) is an American football wide receiver for the TCU Horned Frogs.

== Early life ==
Small attended Anderson High School in Austin, Texas. He initially committed to play college baseball for the Texas Longhorns. However, Small de-committed and announced that he would play college football instead of baseball. He was rated as a three-star recruit by 247Sports and committed to play for the TCU Horned Frogs.

== College career ==
As a freshman in 2025, Small hauled in 16 passes for 186 yards and two touchdowns. In week 3 of the 2026 season, he recorded seven receptions for 164 yards and a touchdown.

== Personal life ==
Small is the son of former Vanderbilt Commodores center Clint Small.
