= 2026 Utah Utes football team =

American college football season

2026 Utah Utes football

Big 12 Championship Game vs. TBD
- Conference: Big 12 Conference

Ranking
- Coaches: No. 2
- AP: No. 2
- CFP: No. 2
- Record: 11–0 (8–0 Big 12)
- Head coach: Morgan Scalley (1st season)
- Offensive coordinator: Kevin McGiven (1st season)
- Offensive scheme: Pro spread
- Defensive coordinator: Colton Swan (1st season)
- Base defense: 4–2–5
- Home stadium: Rice–Eccles Stadium

Uniform
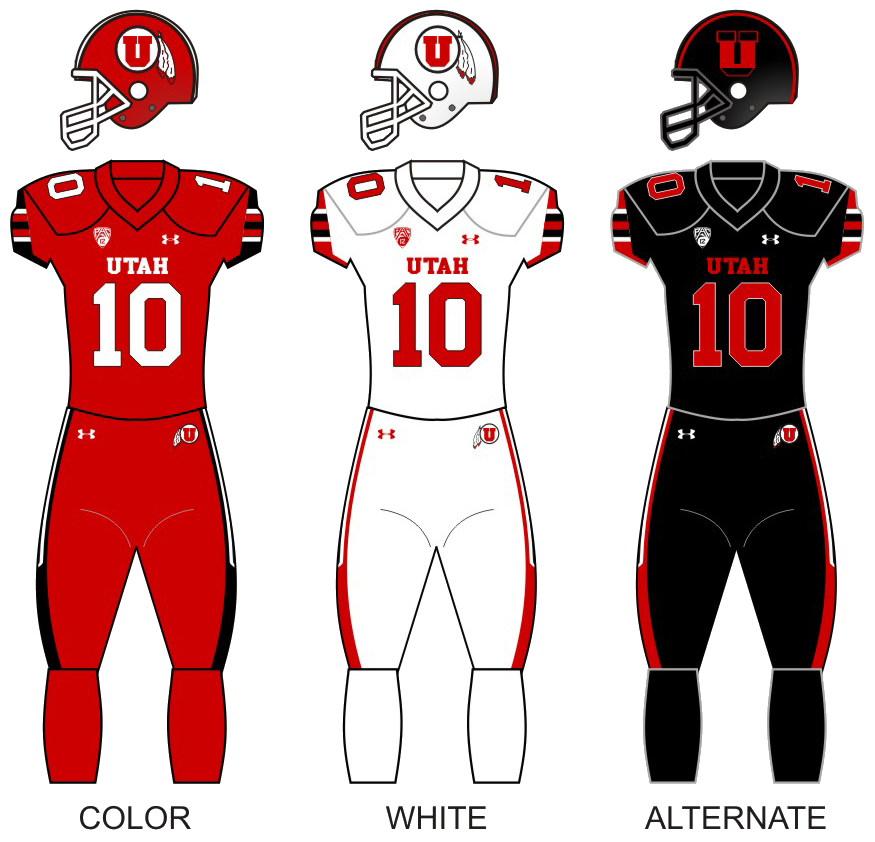

2026 Big 12 Conference football standings
	Conf.			Overall
Team	W		L	W		L
No. 2 Utah y	8	–	0	11	–	0
No. 12 Texas Tech	7	–	1	10	–	1
No. 10 BYU	6	–	2	9	–	2
No. 19 Arizona	5	–	3	8	–	3
No. 20 Houston	5	–	3	8	–	3
Oklahoma State	5	–	3	7	–	4
Baylor	4	–	4	6	–	5
Arizona State	4	–	4	6	–	5
UCF	4	–	4	6	–	5
Iowa State	3	–	5	5	–	6
TCU	3	–	5	5	–	6
Cincinnati	3	–	5	6	–	5
Kansas	2	–	6	4	–	7
West Virginia	2	–	6	5	–	6
Colorado	2	–	6	4	–	7
Kansas State	1	–	7	4	–	7
Championship: TBD vs. Utah
^ – College Football Playoff participant; $ – Conference champion; y – Championship game participant; As of November 22, 2026; Rankings from CFP rankings

The 2026 Utah Utes football team is an American college football team that represents the University of Utah as a member of the Big 12 Conference during the 2026 NCAA Division I FBS football season. Morgan Scalley was promoted to head coach after Kyle Whittingham's departure in December 2025 to become head coach at Michigan. In their first year under Scalley, and with one game remaining in the regular season, the Utes have compiled an undefeated 11–0 record (8–0 in conference games) and are ranked No. 2 in the AP and Coaches polls. In two games against ranked opponents, the Utes defeated No. 9 BYU and No. 23 Arizona.

Through the first ten games, the team's statistical leaders are quarterback Devon Dampier (2,535 passing yards), running back Wayshawn Parker (765 rushing yards, 78 points scored), wide receiver Braden Pegan (49 receptions for 718 yards), and linebacker Trey Reynolds (60 total tackles).

The team plays its home games at Rice–Eccles Stadium in Salt Lake City, Utah.

== Schedule ==
Date	Time	Opponent	Rank	Site	TV	Result	Attendance
September 3	7:00 p.m.	Idaho*	No. 21	Rice–Eccles Stadium; Salt Lake City, UT	ESPNU	W 66–14	51,444
September 12	8:15 p.m.	Arkansas*	No. 20	Rice–Eccles Stadium; Salt Lake City, UT	ESPN	W 43–10	51,532
September 19	1:30 p.m.	Utah State*	No. 17	Rice–Eccles Stadium; Salt Lake City, UT (Battle of the Brothers)	FOX	W 33–0	51,455
September 26	1:30 p.m.	at Iowa State	No. 15	Jack Trice Stadium; Ames, IA	FOX	W 31–17	52,150
October 10	6:00 p.m.	Kansas	No. 12	Rice–Eccles Stadium; Salt Lake City, UT	ESPNews/ESPN	W 41–24	51,467
October 17	8:15 p.m.	at Colorado	No. 11	Folsom Field; Boulder, CO (Rumble in the Rockies)	ESPN	W 27–24	52,489
October 24	8:15 p.m.	No. 14 Houston^{†}	No. 10	Rice–Eccles Stadium; Salt Lake City, UT (College GameDay)	ESPN	W 21–13	51,864
October 31	1:45 p.m.	at Cincinnati	No. 6	Nippert Stadium; Cincinnati, OH	ESPN	W 49–25	36,487
November 7	10:00 a.m.	No. 9 BYU	No. 3	Rice–Eccles Stadium; Salt Lake City, UT (Holy War)	ABC	W 28–20	52,901
November 14	8:30 p.m.	at No. 23 Arizona	No. 2	Casino Del Sol Stadium; Tucson, AZ (Big Noon Kickoff)	FOX	W 40–39	48,858
November 21	7:00 p.m.	at TCU	No. 2	Amon G. Carter Stadium; Fort Worth, TX	FOX	W 38–17	36,906
November 27	7:00 p.m.	West Virginia		Rice–Eccles Stadium; Salt Lake City, UT	FOX		
December 4	6:00 p.m.	vs. TBD		AT&T Stadium; Arlington, TX (Big 12 Championship Game)	ABC		
*Non-conference game; ^{†}Homecoming; Rankings from AP Poll (and CFP Rankings, after November 3) - Released prior to game; All times are in Mountain time; Source:

== Rankings ==
Ranking movements Legend: ██ Increase in ranking ██ Decrease in ranking ( ) = First-place votes
	Week															
Poll	Pre	1	2	3	4	5	6	7	8	9	10	11	12	13	14	Final
AP	21	20	17	15	13	12	11	10	6 (1)	3 (1)	2 (12)	2 (10)				
Coaches	21	20	17	15	13	12	11	9	5	4	2 (14)	2 (11)				
CFP	Not released									3	2	2				Not released

== Game summaries ==
=== vs. Idaho (FCS) ===
Idaho Vandals (FCS) (0–1) at No. 21 Utah Utes (0–0) – Game summary

Quarter	1	2	3	4	Total
Vandals (FCS)	0	7	7	0	14
No. 21 Utes	17	14	14	21	66

at Rice–Eccles Stadium • Salt Lake City, Utah

- Date: September 3
- Game time: 7:00 p.m.
- Game weather: Clear • Temperature: 83 °F (28 °C) • Wind: S 8 mph
- Game attendance: 51,444
- Referee: Mike McCabe
- TV announcers (ESPNU): Pete Sousa and Leger Douzable

Game information

First quarter

- UTAH – Wayshawn Parker 9-yard pass from Devon Dampier (Dillon Curtis kick), 12:40. Utes 7–0. Drive: 4 plays, 29 yards, 1:33.
- UTAH – Dillon Curtis 24-yard field goal, 10:40. Utes 10–0. Drive: 4 plays, 6 yards, 1:50.
- UTAH – Wayshawn Parker 21-yard run (Dillon Curtis kick), 1:07. Utes 17–0. Drive: 6 plays, 68 yards, 2:56.

Second quarter

- IDHO – Hayden Kincheloe 3-yard run (Owen Forsman kick), 9:40. Utes 17–7. Drive: 13 plays, 75 yards, 6:27.
- UTAH – Braden Pegan 7-yard pass from Devon Dampier (Dillon Curtis kick), 4:39. Utes 24–7. Drive: 11 plays, 75 yards, 5:01.
- UTAH – Wayshawn Parker 3-yard pass from Devon Dampier (Dillon Curtis kick), 0:32. Utes 31–7. Drive: 7 plays, 46 yards, 3:03.

Third quarter

- UTAH – Braden Pegan 12-yard run (Dillon Curtis kick), 13:15. Utes 38–7. Drive: 7 plays, 75 yards, 1:45.
- UTAH – Noah Bennee 35-yard pass from Byrd Ficklin (Dillon Curtis kick), 4:45. Utes 45–7. Drive: 4 plays, 44 yards, 2:23.
- IDHO – Joshua Wood 22-yard run (Owen Forsman kick), 1:21. Utes 45–14. Drive: 7 plays, 75 yards, 3:24.

Fourth quarter

- UTAH – Hunter Andrews 9-yard pass from Byrd Ficklin (Dillon Curtis kick), 14:36. Utes 52–14. Drive: 5 plays, 75 yards, 1:45.
- UTAH – Steve Chavez-Soto 5-yard run (Tanner Cragun kick), 9:13. Utes 59–14. Drive: 6 plays, 44 yards, 3:14.
- UTAH – LaMarcus Bell 34-yard run (Tanner Cragun kick), 1:04. Utes 66–14. Drive: 8 plays, 87 yards, 5:25.

Statistics	IDHO	UTAH
First downs	13	33
Plays–yards	61–225	75–633
Rushes–yards	31–106	49–364
Passing yards	119	269
Passing: comp–att–int	11–30–1	17–26–0
Turnovers	2	0
Time of possession	25:40	34:20

Team	Category	Player	Statistics
Idaho	Passing	Joshua Wood	9/27, 111 yards, INT
Idaho	Rushing	Joshua Wood	9 carries, 41 yards, TD
Idaho	Receiving	Noah West-Baranco	1 reception, 44 yards
Utah	Passing	Devon Dampier	13/18, 176 yards, 3 TD
Utah	Rushing	LaMarcus Bell	7 carries, 87 yards, TD
Utah	Receiving	Braden Pegan	4 receptions, 81 yards, TD

=== vs. Arkansas ===
Arkansas Razorbacks (1–0) at No. 20 Utah Utes (1–0) – Game summary

Quarter	1	2	3	4	Total
Razorbacks	3	0	0	7	10
No. 20 Utes	7	22	7	7	43

at Rice–Eccles Stadium • Salt Lake City, Utah

- Date: September 12
- Game time: 8:15 p.m.
- Game weather: Clear • Temperature: 81 °F (27 °C) • Wind: E at 6 miles per hour (9.7 km/h)
- Game attendance: 51,532
- Referee: Luke Richmond
- TV announcers (ESPN): Justin Kutcher, Roddy Jones, and Quint Kessenich

Game information

First quarter

- ARK – Max Gilbert 29-yard field goal, 7:44. Razorbacks 3–0. Drive: 14 plays, 64 yards, 7:16.
- UTAH – Wayshawn Parker 1-yard run (Dillon Curtis kick), 3:39. Utes 7–3. Drive: 10 plays, 75 yards, 4:05.

Second quarter

- UTAH – Devon Dampier 7-yard run (Mana Carvalho run), 9:23. Utes 15–3. Drive: 3 plays, 24 yards, 1:28.
- UTAH – Wayshawn Parker 9-yard run (Dillon Curtis kick), 1:55. Utes 22–3. Drive: 6 plays, 67 yards, 3:05.
- UTAH – Wayshawn Parker 7-yard pass from Devon Dampier (Dillon Curtis kick), 0:27. Utes 29–3. Drive: 6 plays, 64 yards, 1:05.

Third quarter

- UTAH – Noah Bennee 1-yard pass from Devon Dampier (Dillon Curtis kick), 12:03. Utes 36–3. Drive: 5 plays, 75 yards, 2:57.

Fourth quarter

- UTAH – Devon Dampier 2-yard run (Dillon Curtis kick), 12:47. Utes 43–3. Drive: 11 plays, 70 yards, 4:45.
- ARK – Ismael Cisse 21-yard pass from AJ Hill (Max Gilbert kick), 6:43. Utes 43–10. Drive: 14 plays, 75 yards, 6:04.

Statistics	ARK	UTAH
First downs	21	24
Plays–yards	76–305	62–442
Rushes–yards	28–61	34–141
Passing yards	244	301
Passing: comp–att–int	22–48–1	20–28–1
Turnovers	1	1
Time of possession	31:57	28:03

Team	Category	Player	Statistics
Arkansas	Passing	KJ Jackson	14/34, 139 yards, INT
Arkansas	Rushing	KJ Jackson	7 carries, 34 yards
Arkansas	Receiving	Chris Marshall	5 receptions, 63 yards
Utah	Passing	Devon Dampier	18/24, 261 yards, 2 TD, INT
Utah	Rushing	Wayshawn Parker	10 carries, 53 yards, 2 TD
Utah	Receiving	Noah Bennee	4 receptions, 113 yards, TD

=== vs. Utah State (Battle of the Brothers) ===
Utah State Aggies (0–2) at No. 17 Utah Utes (2–0) – Game summary

Quarter	1	2	3	4	Total
Aggies	0	0	0	0	0
No. 17 Utes	16	10	7	0	33

at Rice–Eccles Stadium • Salt Lake City, Utah

- Date: September 19
- Game time: 1:43 p.m.
- Game weather: Cloudy • Temperature: 68 °F (20 °C) • Wind: W at 7 miles per hour (11 km/h)
- Game attendance: 51,455
- Referee: Gary Reed
- TV announcers (FOX): Dan Hellie and Robert Smith
- Report: Official report

Game information

First quarter

- UTAH - Braden Pegan 28-yard pass from Devon Dampier (Dillon Curtis kick), 10:37. Utes 7-0. Drive: 9 plays, 75 yards, 4:23.
- UTAH - Byrd Ficklin 9-yard run (Two-point run conversion failed), 5:38. Utes 13-0. Drive: 7 plays, 75 yards, 3:02.
- UTAH - Dillon Curtis 36-yard field goal, 0:04. Utes 16-0. Drive: 9 plays, 57 yards, 4:41.

Second quarter

- UTAH - Dillon Curtis 54-yard field goal, 4:48. Utes 19-0. Drive: 13 plays, 63 yards, 5:35.
- UTAH - Braden Pegan 37-yard pass from Devon Dampier (Dillon Curtis kick), 0:33. Utes 26-0. Drive: 3 plays, 39 yards, 0:21.

Third quarter

- UTAH - Daniel Bray 63-yard run (Dillon Curtis kick), 5:16. Utes 33-0. Drive: 4 plays, 80 yards, 1:48.

Fourth quarter

- No scoring plays

Statistics	USU	UTAH
First downs	10	23
Plays–yards	54–188	74–480
Rushes–yards	25–58	37–194
Passing yards	130	286
Passing: comp–att–int	15–29–1	25–37–0
Turnovers	1	1
Time of possession	24:46	35:14

Team	Category	Player	Statistics
Utah State	Passing	Grady Brosterhous	15/29, 130 yards, INT
Utah State	Rushing	Javen Jacobs	5 carries, 31 yards
Utah State	Receiving	Eli Wood	4 receptions, 41 yards
Utah	Passing	Devon Dampier	22/32, 253 yards, 2 TD
Utah	Rushing	Daniel Bray	3 carries, 82 yards, TD
Utah	Receiving	Braden Pegan	8 receptions, 122 yards, 2 TD

=== at Iowa State ===
No. 15 Utah Utes (3–0) at Iowa State Cyclones (2–1) – Game summary

Quarter	1	2	3	4	Total
No. 15 Utes	14	10	0	7	31
Cyclones	0	3	7	7	17

at Jack Trice Stadium • Ames, Iowa

- Date: September 26
- Game time: 1:30 p.m.
- Game weather: Cloudy • Temperature: 62 °F (17 °C) • Wind: SE 11 mph
- Game attendance: 52,150
- Referee: Henry Johns
- TV announcers (FOX): Tim Brando, Devin Gardner, and Josh Sims

Game information

First quarter

- UTAH - Wayshawn Parker 54-yard run (Dillon Curtis kick), 14:44. Utes 7–0. Drive: 1 plays, 54 yards, 0:10.
- UTAH - Braden Pegan 24-yard pass from Devon Dampier (Dillon Curtis kick), 2:32. Utes 14–0. Drive: 9 plays, 90 yards, 4:02.

Second quarter

- UTAH - Dillon Curtis 27-yard field goal, 10:14. Utes 17–0. Drive: 10 plays, 39 yards, 4:59.
- ISU - Kyle Konrardy 47-yard field goal, 3:50. Utes 17–3. Drive: 13 plays, 46 yards, 6:24.
- UTAH - Wayshawn Parker 1-yard run (Dillon Curtis kick), 1:35. Utes 24–3. Drive: 8 plays, 75 yards, 2:15.

Third quarter

- ISU - Jaylen Raynor 8-yard run (Kyle Konrardy kick), 8:00. Utes 24–10. Drive: 12 plays, 82 yards, 6:54.

Fourth quarter

- ISU - Dominic Overby 22-yard pass from Jaylen Raynor (Kyle Konrardy kick), 10:48. Utes 24–17. Drive: 11 plays, 81 yards, 4:42.
- UTAH - Wayshawn Parker 13-yard pass from Devon Dampier (Dillon Curtis kick), 2:58. Utes 31–17. Drive: 7 plays, 61 yards, 4:28.

Statistics	UTAH	ISU
First downs	21	23
Plays–yards	60–411	73–316
Rushes–yards	33–205	33–111
Passing yards	206	205
Passing: comp–att–int	18–27–0	21–40–2
Time of possession	28:04	31:56

Team	Category	Player	Statistics
Utah	Passing	Devon Dampier	18/27, 206 yards, 2 TD
Utah	Rushing	Wayshawn Parker	18 carries, 175 yards, 2 TD
Utah	Receiving	Wayshawn Parker	5 receptions, 65 yards, TD
Iowa State	Passing	Jaylen Raynor	21/40, 205 yards, TD, 2 INT
Iowa State	Rushing	Aiden Flora	13 carries, 57 yards
Iowa State	Receiving	Omari Hayes	5 receptions 55 yards

=== vs. Kansas ===
Kansas Jayhawks (2–2) at No. 12 Utah Utes (4–0) – Game summary

Quarter	1	2	3	4	Total
Jayhawks	0	17	7	0	24
No. 12 Utes	14	7	6	14	41

at Rice–Eccles Stadium • Salt Lake City, Utah

- Date: October 10
- Game time: 6:00 p.m.
- Game weather: Cloudy • Temperature: 70 °F (21 °C) • Wind: S 7 mph
- Game attendance: 51,467
- Referee: Michael McCabe
- TV announcers (ESPNews): Roy Philpott, Brock Osweiler, and Sherree Burress
  (Gridiron Radio): Chris Sylvester, Jon Reynolds, and Robbie Bullough

Game information

First quarter

- UTAH - Wayshawn Parker 5-yard run (Dillon Curtis kick), 9:21. Utes 7–0. Drive: 10 plays, 75 yards, 5:39.
- UTAH - Devon Dampier 12-yard run (Dillon Curtis kick), 6:19. Utes 14–0. Drive: 3 plays, 66 yards, 1:19.

Second quarter

- KAN - Dylan Edwards 3-yard pass from Isaiah Marshall (Martin Connington kick), 14:09. Utes 14–7. Drive: 3 plays, 7 yards, 1:18.
- UTAH - Noah Bennee 6-yard pass from Devon Dampier (Dillon Curtis kick), 10:16. Utes 21–7. Drive: 7 plays, 75 yards, 3:53.
- KAN - Isaiah Marshall 1-yard run (Martin Connington kick), 0:42. Utes 21–14. Drive: 5 plays, 66 yards, 0:27.
- KAN - Martin Connington 34-yard field goal, 0:34. Utes 21–17. Drive: 5 plays, 48 yards, 0:34.

Third quarter

- UTAH - Ricky Johnson 6-yard pass from Devon Dampier (Dillon Curtis missed kick), 5:13. Utes 27–17. Drive: 15 plays, 82 yards, 7:24.
- KAN - Nik McMillan 29-yard pass from Isaiah Marshall (Martin Connington kick), 0:27. Utes 27–24. Drive: 9 plays, 75 yards, 4:46.

Fourth quarter

- UTAH - Semi Taulanga 1-yard pass from Devon Dampier (Dillon Curtis kick), 10:45. Utes 34–24. Drive: 9 plays, 75 yards, 4:42.
- UTAH - Wayshawn Parker 90-yard run (Dillon Curtis kick), 7:13. Utes 41–24. Drive: 3 plays, 99 yards, 1:18.

Statistics	KU	UTAH
First downs	19	31
Plays–yards	58–391	78–545
Rushes–yards	21–58	47–287
Passing yards	333	258
Passing: comp–att–int	19–37–1	24–31–1
Time of possession	20:56	39:04

Team	Category	Player	Statistics
Kansas	Passing	Isaiah Marshall	19/37, 333 yards, 2 TD, INT
Kansas	Rushing	Isaiah Marshall	9 carries, 26 yards, TD
Kansas	Receiving	Cam Pickett	8 receptions, 134 yards
Utah	Passing	Devon Dampier	23/30, 238 yards, 3 TD, INT
Utah	Rushing	Wayshawn Parker	16 carries, 175 yards, 2 TD
Utah	Receiving	Ricky Johnson	5 receptions, 104 yards, TD

=== at Colorado (Rumble in the Rockies) ===
No. 11 Utah Utes (5–0) at Colorado Buffaloes (2–3) – Game summary

Quarter	1	2	3	4	Total
No. 11 Utes	7	6	7	7	27
Buffaloes	0	0	17	7	24

at Folsom Field • Boulder, Colorado

- Date: October 17
- Game time: 8:15 p.m.
- Game weather: Clear • Temperature: 59 °F (15 °C) • Wind: W 12 mph
- Game attendance: 52,489
- Referee: Kevin Boitmann
- TV announcers (ESPN): Jay Alter, Tom Luginbill, and Sherree Burress

Game information

First quarter

- UTAH - Hunter Andrews 8-yard pass from Devon Dampier (Dillon Curtis kick), 9:39. Utes 7–0. Drive: 12 plays, 75 yards, 5:21.

Second quarter

- UTAH - Dillon Curtis 27-yard field goal, 8:58. Utes 10–0. Drive: 17 plays, 84 yards, 8:35.
- UTAH - Dillon Curtis 29-yard field goal, 0:00. Utes 13–0. Drive: 6 plays, 47 yards, 1:07.

Third quarter

- COL - JaQuil Smith 68-yard pass from Isaac Wilson (Elliott Arnold kick), 13:20. Utes 13–3. Drive: 3 plays, 75 yards, 1:40.
- COL - DeKalon Taylor 18-yard run (Elliott Arnold kick), 4:24. Buffaloes 14–13. Drive: 5 plays, 76 yards, 2:06.
- COL - Elliott Arnold 32-yard field goal, 4:24. Buffaloes 17–13. Drive: 7 plays, 21 yards, 3:28.
- UTAH - Braden Pegan 16-yard pass from Devon Dampier (Dillon Curtis kick), 1:06. Utes 20–17. Drive: 8 plays, 75 yards, 3:18.

Fourth quarter

- UTAH - Braden Pegan 6-yard pass from Devon Dampier (Dillon Curtis kick), 3:43. Utes 27–17. Drive: 3 plays, 22 yards, 1:26.
- COL - DeAndre Moore Jr. 2-yard pass from Isaac Wilson (Elliott Arnold kick), 1:21. Utes 27–24. Drive: 8 plays, 83 yards, 2:15.

Statistics	UTAH	COLO
First downs	26	18
Plays–yards	80–409	55–394
Rushes–yards	39–131	24–138
Passing yards	278	256
Passing: comp–att–int	24–41–2	18–31–2
Time of possession	37:00	23:00

Team	Category	Player	Statistics
Utah	Passing	Devon Dampier	24/41, 278 yards, 3 TD, 2 INT
Utah	Rushing	Wayshawn Parker	23 carries, 103 yards
Utah	Receiving	Creed Whittemore	3 receptions, 88 yards
Colorado	Passing	Isaac Wilson	18/30, 256 yards, 2 TD, 2 INT
Colorado	Rushing	Jaquail Smith	13 carries, 73 yards
Colorado	Receiving	Deandre Moore Jr.	5 receptions, 70 yards, TD

=== vs. No. 14 Houston ===
No. 14 Houston Cougars (6–1) at No. 10 Utah Utes (6–0) – Game summary

Quarter	1	2	3	4	Total
No. 14 Cougars	0	3	10	0	13
No. 10 Utes	0	0	7	14	21

at Rice–Eccles Stadium • Salt Lake City, Utah

- Date: October 24
- Game time: 8:15 p.m.
- Game weather: Clear • Temperature: 47 °F (8 °C) • Wind: NE at 5 miles per hour (8.0 km/h)
- Game attendance: 51,864
- Referee: Henry Johns
- TV announcers (ESPN): Tom Hart, Roddy Jones, and Quint Kessenich

Game information
First quarter
- No scoring plays.

Second quarter

- HOU – Jonathan Dimas 24-yard field goal, 3:44, Cougars 3–0. Drive: 15 plays, 74 yards, 7:44.

Third quarter

- HOU – Makhi Hughes 2-yard run (Jonathan Dimas kick), 6:46. Cougars 10–0. Drive: 15 plays, 75 yards, 8:14.
- UTAH – Devon Dampier 22-yard run (Dillon Curtis kick), 4:25. Cougars 10–7. Drive: 5 plays, 75 yards, 2:21.
- HOU – Jonathan Dimas 47-yard field goal, 2:17, Cougars 13–7. Drive: 5 plays, 38 yards, 2:01.

Fourth quarter

- UTAH – Wayshawn Parker 5-yard run (Dillon Curtis kick), 11:57. Utes 14–13. Drive: 10 plays, 80 yards, 5:13.
- UTAH – Devon Dampier 9-yard run (Dillon Curtis kick), 2:09. Utes 21–13. Drive: 1 play, 9 yards, 0:06.

Statistics	HOU	UTAH
First downs	17	24
Plays–yards	66–368	61–430
Rushes–yards	31–86	35–226
Passing yards	282	204
Passing: comp–att–int	19–35–0	18–26–2
Time of possession	29:55	30:05

Team	Category	Player	Statistics
Houston	Passing	Conner Weigman	19/35, 282 yards
Houston	Rushing	Makhi Hughes	19 carries, 54 yards, TD
Houston	Receiving	Amare Thomas	5 receptions, 133 yards
Utah	Passing	Devon Dampier	18/26, 204 yards, 2 INT
Utah	Rushing	Devon Dampier	153 yards, 2 TD
Utah	Receiving	Creed Whittemore	4 receptions, 53 yards

=== at Cincinnati ===
No. 6 Utah Utes (7–0) at Cincinnati Bearcats (5–2) – Game summary

Quarter	1	2	3	4	Total
No. 6 Utes	14	28	7	0	49
Bearcats	3	3	13	6	25

at Nippert Stadium • Cincinnati, Ohio

- Date: October 31
- Game time: 1:45 p.m.
- Game attendance: 36,487
- TV announcers (ESPN): Tom Hart, Roddy Jones, and Quint Kessenich

Statistics	UTAH	CIN
First downs	27	18
Plays–yards	73–537	62–456
Rushes–yards	42–268	32–193
Passing yards	266	263
Passing: comp–att–int	23–31–1	16–30–1
Time of possession	35:30	24:30

Team	Category	Player	Statistics
Utah	Passing	Devon Dampier	22/29, 260 yards, 3 TD, INT
Utah	Rushing	Wayshawn Parker	7 carries, 88 yards, TD
Utah	Receiving	Hunter Andrews	5 receptions, 112 yards, 2 TD
Cincinnati	Passing	JC French	16/30, 263 yards, INT
Cincinnati	Rushing	Cole Tabb	14 carries, 132 yards, TD
Cincinnati	Receiving	JV Gibson	5 receptions, 76 yards

=== vs. No. 9 BYU (Holy War) ===
No. 9 BYU Cougars (7–1) at No. 3 Utah Utes (8–0) – Game summary

Quarter	1	2	3	4	Total
No. 9 Cougars	3	17	0	0	20
No. 3 Utes	14	0	7	7	28

at Rice–Eccles Stadium • Salt Lake City, Utah

- Date: November 7
- Game time: 10:00 a.m.
- Game weather: Sunny • Temperature: 50 °F (10 °C) • Wind: SW 2 mph (3.2 km/h)
- Game attendance: 52,901
- Referee: Michael VanderVelde
- TV announcers (ABC): Dave Pasch, Dusty Dvoracek, and Taylor McGregor

Game information

First quarter

- UTAH – 13:45 Devon Dampier 22-yard run (Dillon Curtis kick). UTAH 7–0. Drive: 3 plays, 75 yards, 1:15.
- UTAH – 10:31 Braden Pegan 46-yard pass from Devon Dampier (Dillon Curtis kick). UTAH 14–0. Drive: 4 plays, 63 yards, 1:19.
- BYU – 6:04 Matthias Dunn 31-yard Field Goal. UTAH 14–3. Drive: 8 plays, 62 yards, 4:27.

Second quarter

- BYU – 14:51 Matthias Dunn 38-yard Field Goal. UTAH 14–6. Drive: 9 plays, 37 yards, 4:45.
- BYU – 13:17 Legend Glasker 75-yard pass from Bear Bachmeier (Matthias Dunn kick). UTAH 14–13. Drive: 1 plays, 75 yards, 0:10.
- BYU – 7:35 LJ Martin 4-yard run (Matthias Dunn kick). BYU 20–14. Drive: 8 plays, 49 yards, 4:08.

Third quarter

- UTAH – 1:50 Braden Pegan 14-yard pass from Devon Dampier (Dillon Curtis kick). UTAH 21–20. Drive: 9 plays, 53 yards, 5:24.

Fourth quarter

- UTAH – 12:03 Devon Dampier 3-yard run (Dillon Curtis kick). UTAH 28–20. Drive: 7 plays, 68 yards, 4:07.

Statistics	BYU	UTAH
First downs	15	16
Plays–yards	64–391	62–330
Rushes–yards	28–119	35–124
Passing yards	272	206
Passing: comp–att–int	21–36–4	15–27–0
Time of possession	31:52	28:08

Team	Category	Player	Statistics
BYU	Passing	Bear Bachmeier	21/35, 272 yards, TD, 4 INT
BYU	Rushing	Bear Bachmeier	8 carries, 59 yards
BYU	Receiving	Legend Glasker	7 receptions, 118 yards, TD
Utah	Passing	Devon Dampier	14/26, 177 yards, 2 TD
Utah	Rushing	Devon Dampier	20 carries, 111 yards, 2 TD
Utah	Receiving	Braden Pegan	5 receptions, 86 yards, 2 TD

=== at No. 23 Arizona ===
No. 2 Utah Utes (9–0) at No. 23 Arizona Wildcats (7–2) – Game summary

Quarter	1	2	3	4	Total
No. 2 Utes	0	17	7	16	40
No. 23 Wildcats	7	7	14	11	39

at Casino Del Sol Stadium • Tucson, Arizona

- Date: November 14
- Game time: 8:30 p.m.
- Game weather: Clear, 67 °F (19 °C)
- Game attendance: 48,858
- Referee: Kevin Boitmann
- TV announcers (FOX): Gus Johnson, Joel Klatt, and Jenny Taft

Game information

First quarter

- (9:45) ARIZ – Quincy Craig 1-yard run, Michael Salgado-Medina kick (Drive: 11 plays, 75 yards, 5:15; Arizona 7–0)

Second quarter

- (14:55) UTAH – Dillon Curtis 53-yard field goal (Drive: 5 plays, 7 yards, 2:12; Arizona 7–3)
- (9:48) ARIZ – Kedrick Reescano 5-yard run, Michael Salgado-Medina kick (Drive: 10 plays, 75 yards, 5:07; Arizona 14–3)
- (6:27) UTAH – Devon Dampier 14-yard run, Dillon Curtis kick (Drive: 7 plays, 80 yards, 3:15; Arizona 14–10)
- (1:34) UTAH – Devon Dampier 18-yard run, Dillon Curtis kick (Drive: 8 plays, 75 yards, 3:19; Utah 17–14)

Third quarter

- (11:53) ARIZ – Isaiah Mizell 6-yard pass from Noah Fifita, Michael Salgado-Medina kick (Drive: 5 plays, 18 yards, 3:09; Arizona 21–17)
- (10:07) UTAH – Byrd Ficklin 4-yard pass from Devon Dampier, Dillon Curtis kick (Drive: 4 plays, 75 yards, 1:46; Utah 24–21)
- (3:22) ARIZ – Gio Richardson 19-yard pass from Noah Fifita, Michael Salgado-Medina kick (Drive: 5 plays, 99 yards, 2:25; Arizona 28–24)

Fourth quarter

- (14:10) UTAH – Dillon Curtis 39-yard field goal (Drive: 10 plays, 55 yards, 4:12; Arizona 28–27)
- (11:46) UTAH – Daniel Bray 8-yard run, two-point pass failed (Drive: 3 plays, 37 yards, 0:52; Utah 33–28)
- (8:09) ARIZ – Michael Salgado-Medina 47-yard field goal (Drive: 4 plays, -13 yards, 2:18; Utah 33–31)
- (3:13) ARIZ – Isaiah Mizell 10-yard pass from Noah Fifita, Noah Fifita run for two-point conversion (Drive: 5 plays, 91 yards, 2:26; Arizona 39–33)
- (2:35) UTAH – Creed Whittemore 70-yard pass from Devon Dampier, Dillon Curtis kick (Drive: 2 plays, 75 yards, 0:38; Utah 40–39)

Statistics	UTAH	ARIZ
First downs	20	21
Plays–yards	60–500	74–215
Rushes–yards	35–296	31–59
Passing yards	204	356
Passing: comp–att–int	13–25–1	27–43–1
Time of possession	26:06	33:54

Team	Category	Player	Statistics
Utah	Passing	Devon Dampier	13/25, 204 yards, 2 TD, INT
Utah	Rushing	Daniel Bray	18 carries, 197 yards, TD
Utah	Receiving	Creed Whittemore	5 receptions, 92 yards, TD
Arizona	Passing	Noah Fifita	27/43, 356 yards, 3 TD, 1 INT
Arizona	Rushing	Kedrick Reescano	9 carries, 41 yards, TD
Arizona	Receiving	Chris Hunter	6 receptions, 119 yards

=== at TCU ===
No. 2 Utah Utes (10–0) at TCU Horned Frogs (5–5) – Game summary

Quarter	1	2	3	4	Total
No. 2 Utes	0	0	0	0	0
Horned Frogs	0	0	0	0	0

at Amon G. Carter Stadium • Fort Worth, Texas

- Date: November 21
- Game time: 7:00 p.m.
- TV announcers (FOX): Connor Onion, Robert Griffin III, and Alexa Landestoy

Statistics	UTAH	TCU
First downs		
Plays–yards		
Rushes–yards		
Passing yards		
Passing: comp–att–int		
Time of possession		

Team	Category	Player	Statistics
Utah	Passing		
Utah	Rushing		
Utah	Receiving		
TCU	Passing		
TCU	Rushing		
TCU	Receiving		

=== vs. West Virginia ===
West Virginia Mountaineers (0–0) at Utah Utes (0–0) – Game summary

Quarter	1	2	3	4	Total
Mountaineers	0	0	0	0	0
Utes	0	0	0	0	0

at Rice–Eccles Stadium • Salt Lake City, Utah

- Date: November 27
- Game time: 7:00 p.m.
- TV: FOX

Statistics	WVU	UTAH
First downs		
Plays–yards		
Rushes–yards		
Passing yards		
Passing: comp–att–int		
Time of possession		

Team	Category	Player	Statistics
West Virginia	Passing		
West Virginia	Rushing		
West Virginia	Receiving		
Utah	Passing		
Utah	Rushing		
Utah	Receiving		

== Personnel ==
=== Roster ===
2026 Utah Utes football team roster
Players
Coaches
Offense

Pos.	#	Name	Class
WR	0	Kyri Shoels	Sr
RB	1	Wayshawn Parker	Jr
WR	2	Creed Whittemore	Jr
WR	3	Nate Johnson	Sr
QB	4	Devon Dampier	Sr
RB	5	Daniel Bray	So
WR	6	Daidren Zipperer	Jr
WR	7	Braden Pegan	Sr
WR	8	Mana Carvalho	So
QB	9	Kane Archer	Fr
TE	10	Hunter Andrews	So
WR	11	Ricky Johnson	So
WR	12	Larry Simmons	Sr
QB	13	Michael Johnson	Fr
QB	14	Brandon Rose	5th
QB	15	Byrd Ficklin	So
WR	18	Tobias Merriweather	Sr
RB	20	Mateaki Helu	So
RB	25	Steve Chavez-Soto	So
RB	26	LaMarcus Bell	Fr
LB	28	Anthony Hernandez	So
WR	30	Matt Clark	Jr
TE	33	Kana'i Lopes	So
WR	37	Peyton Rice	Jr
WR	39	Junior Coughlin	So
TE	44	Sione Motuapuaka	So
TE	46	Teague Matthews	Fr
OL	54	Milz Asiata	Fr
OL	55	Kelvin Obot	Fr
OL	56	Isaiah Kema	Fr
OL	57	Moses Sparks	Fr
OL	61	Cyrus Nielsen	Fr
OL	62	Solatao Moeai	Sr
OL	63	Devin Entsminger	Fr
OL	64	Reece Parmenter	Jr
OL	66	Will Fry	Fr
OL	67	Soren Shinofield	So
OL	70	Mataalii Benjamin	Fr
OL	71	Rowdy Pearce	Fr
OL	72	Isaiah Garcia	So
OL	73	Cedric Jefferson	Jr
OL	74	Keith Olson	Sr
OL	75	Roger Alderman	Jr
OL	76	Zereoue Williams	5th
OL	77	Nick Hallock	So
OL	79	Alex Harrison	5th
WR	80	Bryson Baker	So
TE	81	Bear Fisher	Fr
WR	82	Max Ausmus	So
RB	84	Jojo Ward	Fr
TE	85	Broderick Redden	So
TE	86	Will Monney	Jr
TE	89	Noah Bennee	Sr
TE	99	Semi Taulanga	So

Defense

Pos.	#	Name	Class
LB	0	Cyrus Polu	So
S	1	Rabbit Evans	5th
CB	2	Rock Caldwell	Sr
CB	4	JC Hart	Jr
CB	5	James Chenault Jr.	Jr
S	6	Nate Ritchie	Sr
LB	7	Johnathan Hall	Sr
DE	8	Ethan Day	Jr
CB	9	Elijah Davis	Sr
LB	10	Trey Reynolds	Sr
CB	11	Elijah Reed	Sr
S	12	Davis Andrews	Fr
CB	13	Nick Brown	So
S	14	Cole Standage	So
DE	15	Lance Holtzclaw	Sr
DE	16	PJ Takitaki	Fr
CB	18	Earl Parker	Jr
CB	19	Dylan Waters	Fr
CB	20	King Long	Fr
S	21	Nate Tilmon	So
S	23	Jackson Bennee	Jr
S	24	Marcus Wimberly	Fr
S	25	Manny Fuller	So
CB	27	Brandon Holmes	So
S	28	Luke Bryant	Fr
CB	29	Major Hinchen	Fr
S	31	Jack Evans	So
S	32	Josh Sovereign	So
S	34	Ashton Olevao	So
LB	35	Preston Pitts	Fr
S	38	Tommy Nelson	So
DE	40	Paul Fitzgerald	Sr
LB	41	LaGary Mitchell	Fr
LB	43	Grady Mareko	Jr
DT	45	Pupu Sepulona	So
DE	46	Mauka Bernard	Fr
DE	47	Jared Fredrick	Fr
DE	48	Alex Cloward	Jr
DT	51	Karson Kaufusi	So
LB	52	Jed Judkins	Fr
LB	53	Brock Fonoimoana	So
LB	54	Tayson Reid	So
DT	57	Stanley Raass	Fr
DE	58	Fa Siale	Fr
LB	83	Elijah Elliss	So
DT	90	Jireh Moe	So
DE	92	Nicholas Igwe	So
DE	93	Kash Dillon	So
DT	94	Mike Tauteoli	Jr
DT	96	Dilan Battle	So
DT	97	Lucas Samsula	So
DT	98	Jamal Wallace (S)	Sr

Special teams

Pos.	#	Name	Class
K	17	Dillon Curtis	So
SN	65	Logan Castor	Sr
SN	69	Gage Victor	So
K	88	Tanner Cragun	Jr
P	92	Orion Phillips	Jr

Head coach

- Morgan Scalley

Coordinators/assistant coaches

- Kevin McGiven – Offensive coordinator
- Colton Swan – Defensive coordinator / linebackers
- Sharrieff Shah – Associate head coach / cornerbacks / special teams coordinator
- Mark Atuaia – Assistant head coach / running backs
- Jordan Gross – Offensive Line
- Chad Bumphis – Wide receivers
- Luke Wells – Tight ends
- Luther Elliss – Defensive tackles
- Inoke Breckterfield - Defensive ends
- Derrick Odum - Safeties
- Ryan Gunderson – Quarterbacks
- Greg Argust - Director of Football Sports Performance
- Adam Fry – Director, football operations
- Sam Morrissette – Director, personnel coordinator
- Kammy Delp – Offensive graduate assistant
- Jordan Fogal – Defensive graduate assistant
- Brandon McKinney – Defensive graduate assistant
- Ryan Blakney – Offensive analyst
- Vince Conti – Defensive analyst
- Jake Cookus – Senior special teams analyst/kickers & punters
- Dom Conti – Special teams analyst
- Robert Blechen – General manager, personnel

Legend

- (C) Team captain
- (S) Suspended
- (I) Ineligible
- Injured
- Redshirt

Roster
Last update: 10/05/26

- Jamal Wallace was suspended indefinitely for an alleged rape, including sexual assault, sodomy and sharing the incident on social media.

=== 2026 recruiting class ===
College recruiting
Name	Hometown	School	Height	Weight	Commit date
Kelvin Obot; OT	Fruitland, Idaho	Fruitland High School	6 ft 6 in (1.98 m)	265 lb (120 kg)	Jul 1, 2025
Kelvin Obot; OT	Recruit ratings: Rivals: 247Sports: ESPN:				
Nicholas Igwe; DL	Houston, Texas	Kilgore College	6 ft 4 in (1.93 m)	255 lb (116 kg)	Jan 18, 2026
Nicholas Igwe; DL	Recruit ratings: Rivals: 247Sports: ESPN:				
Overall recruit ranking: Rivals: 42 247Sports: 33 ESPN: 40
Note: In many cases, Scout, Rivals, 247Sports, On3, and ESPN may conflict in their listings of height and weight.; In these cases, the average was taken. ESPN grades are on a 100-point scale.; Sources: "2026 Utah football commitments". Rivals.; "2026 Team Ranking". Rivals.com.; "2026 Utah football commitments". 247Sports.

=== Incoming transfers ===
Utah incoming transfers
Name	Pos.	Height	Weight	Year	Hometown	Previous team	Notes
Braden Pegan	WR	6'3"	210	SR	San Juan Capistrano, California	Utah State	
Ethan Day	DL	6'4"	250	SR	Ripon, California	North Texas	
Kyri Shoels	WR	6'0"	182	SR	Las Vegas, Nevada	San Jose State	
Steve Chavez-Soto	RB	6'0"	205	SO	Orange, California	San Jose State	
James Chenault	CB	6'0"	180	JR	Orlando, Florida	South Florida	
Tanner Cragun	K	6'2"	205	RS-JR	Frisco, Texas	UTEP	
Lucas Samsula	DL	6'4"	306	JR	Plano, Texas	Wyoming	
Isaiah Kema	IOL	6'3"	312	SO	Wolfforth, Texas	Ohio State	
Jamal Wallace	DL	6'3"	313	SR	Kansas City, Missouri	Tennessee	
Jireh Moe	DL	6'0"	280	SO	Orange, California	San Jose State	
Elijah Reed	CB	6'3"	200	SR	Louisville, Kentucky	Akron	
Marcus Wimberly	S	6'1"	193	SO	Bauxite, Arkansas	Oklahoma	
Cedric Jefferson	OT	6'5"	300	JR	Temecula, California	Montana State	
Nick Brown	CB	6'0"	170	RS-FR	Cypress, Texas	Lamar	
Noah Bennee	TE	6'4"	240	GS	Salt Lake City, Utah	Weber State	
Ricky Johnson	WR	6'2"	185	SO	Warner Robins, Georgia	Mississippi State	
Will Monney	TE	6'4"	230	SR	Springville, Utah	Oklahoma State	
Brandon Rose	QB	6'2"	212	RS-SR	Temecula, California	UMass	
