= 2021 Utah Utes football team =

American college football season

2021 Utah Utes football

Pac-12 champion Pac-12 South Division champion

Pac-12 Championship Game, W 38–10 vs. Oregon

Rose Bowl, L 45–48 vs. Ohio State
- Conference: Pac-12 Conference
- South Division

Ranking
- Coaches: No. 12
- AP: No. 12
- Record: 10–4 (8–1 Pac-12)
- Head coach: Kyle Whittingham (17th season)
- Offensive coordinator: Andy Ludwig (7th season)
- Offensive scheme: Spread
- Defensive coordinator: Morgan Scalley (6th season)
- Base defense: 4–2–5
- Home stadium: Rice–Eccles Stadium

Uniform
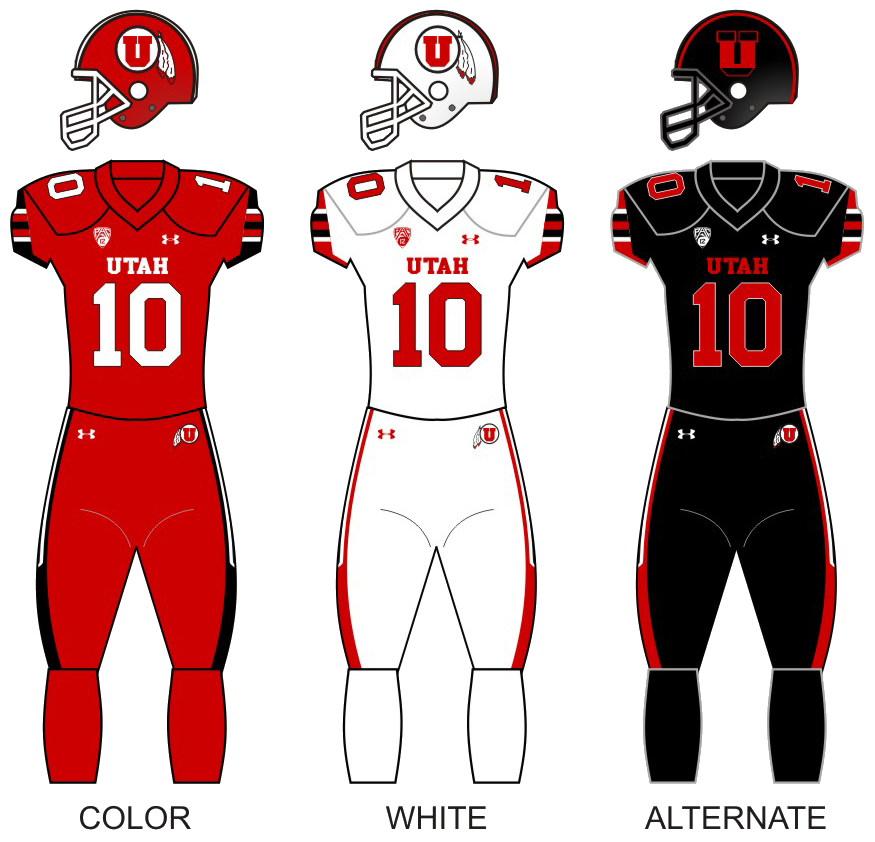

2021 Pac-12 Conference football standings
| | Conf. | | | Overall |
| Team | W | | L | W | | L |
|---|---|---|---|---|---|---|
North Division
| No. 22 Oregon xy | 7 | – | 2 | 10 | – | 4 |
| Washington State | 6 | – | 3 | 7 | – | 6 |
| Oregon State | 5 | – | 4 | 7 | – | 6 |
| California | 4 | – | 5 | 5 | – | 7 |
| Washington | 3 | – | 6 | 4 | – | 8 |
| Stanford | 2 | – | 7 | 3 | – | 9 |
South Division
| No. 12 Utah xy$ | 8 | – | 1 | 10 | – | 4 |
| UCLA | 6 | – | 3 | 8 | – | 4 |
| Arizona State† | 0 | – | 3 | 0 | – | 5 |
| USC | 3 | – | 6 | 4 | – | 8 |
| Colorado | 3 | – | 6 | 4 | – | 8 |
| Arizona | 1 | – | 8 | 1 | – | 11 |
Championship: Utah 38, Oregon 10
$ – Conference champion; x – Division champion/co-champions; y – Championship game participant; Rankings from AP Poll

The 2021 Utah Utes football team represented the University of Utah during the 2021 NCAA Division I FBS football season. The Utes were led by 17th-year head coach Kyle Whittingham and played their home games at Rice–Eccles Stadium in Salt Lake City as members of the South Division of the Pac-12 Conference. Despite a rough start to the season and the death of players Ty Jordan and Aaron Lowe, the Utes rallied and won their first Pac-12 championship since joining the conference in 2011, defeating the tenth-ranked Oregon Ducks, 38–10, in the conference championship game. The Utes completed their season with their first ever appearance in the Rose Bowl, where they lost to Ohio State.

== Schedule ==
| Date | Time | Opponent | Rank | Site | TV | Result | Attendance |
|---|---|---|---|---|---|---|---|
| September 2 | 7:30 p.m. | No. 6 (FCS) Weber State* | No. 24 | Rice–Eccles Stadium; Salt Lake City, UT | P12N | W 40–17 | 51,511 |
| September 11 | 8:15 p.m. | at BYU* | No. 21 | LaVell Edwards Stadium; Provo, UT (Holy War) | ESPN | L 17–26 | 63,470 |
| September 18 | 5:00 p.m. | at San Diego State* | | Dignity Health Sports Park; Carson, CA | CBSSN | L 31–33 ^{3OT} | 11,090 |
| September 25 | 12:30 p.m. | Washington State^{†} | | Rice–Eccles Stadium; Salt Lake City, UT | P12N | W 24–13 | 51,483 |
| October 9 | 6:00 p.m. | at USC | | Los Angeles Memorial Coliseum; Los Angeles, CA | FOX | W 42–26 | 54,088 |
| October 16 | 8:00 p.m. | No. 18 Arizona State | | Rice–Eccles Stadium; Salt Lake City, UT | ESPN | W 35–21 | 51,724 |
| October 23 | 5:30 p.m. | at Oregon State | | Reser Stadium; Corvallis, OR | P12N | L 34–42 | 30,203 |
| October 30 | 8:00 p.m. | UCLA | | Rice–Eccles Stadium; Salt Lake City, UT | ESPN | W 44–24 | 51,922 |
| November 5 | 8:30 p.m. | at Stanford | | Stanford Stadium; Stanford, CA | FS1 | W 52–7 | 26,410 |
| November 13 | 12:00 p.m. | at Arizona | No. 24 | Arizona Stadium; Tucson, AZ | P12N | W 38–29 | 32,008 |
| November 20 | 5:30 p.m. | No. 3 Oregon | No. 23 | Rice–Eccles Stadium; Salt Lake City, UT | ABC | W 38–7 | 52,724 |
| November 26 | 2:00 p.m. | Colorado | No. 19 | Rice–Eccles Stadium; Salt Lake City, UT (Rumble in the Rockies) | FOX | W 28–13 | 51,538 |
| December 3 | 6:00 p.m. | vs. No. 10 Oregon | No. 17 | Allegiant Stadium; Paradise, NV (Pac-12 Championship Game) | ABC | W 38–10 | 56,511 |
| January 1, 2022 | 3:00 p.m. | vs. No. 6 Ohio State* | No. 11 | Rose Bowl; Pasadena, CA (Rose Bowl Game, College GameDay) | ESPN | L 45–48 | 87,842 |
*Non-conference game; ^{†}Homecoming; Rankings from AP Poll (and CFP Rankings, after November 2) - Released prior to game; All times are in Mountain time

== Rankings ==
Ranking movements Legend: ██ Increase in ranking ██ Decrease in ranking — = Not ranked RV = Received votes
| | Week | | | | | | | | | | | | | | | |
| Poll | Pre | 1 | 2 | 3 | 4 | 5 | 6 | 7 | 8 | 9 | 10 | 11 | 12 | 13 | 14 | Final |
|---|---|---|---|---|---|---|---|---|---|---|---|---|---|---|---|---|
| AP | 24 | 21 | RV | — | — | — | — | RV | — | RV | RV | 24 | 16 | 14 | 10 | 12 |
| Coaches | RV | 18 | RV | — | — | — | — | RV | RV | RV | RV | 25 | 19 | 19 | 11 | 12 |
| CFP | Not released | | | | | | | | | — | 24 | 23 | 19 | 17 | 11 | Not released |

== Personnel ==
2021 Utah Utes football team roster
Players
Coaches
Offense

| Pos. | # | Name | Class |
|---|---|---|---|
| RB | 37 | Faysal Aden | Fr |
| QB | 16 | Bryson Barnes | Fr |
| WR | 88 | Noah Bennee | Fr |
| RB | 2 | Micah Bernard | Fr |
| OL | 51 | Keaton Bills | Fr |
| WR | 11 | Makai Cope | Fr |
| WR | 18 | Britain Covey | Jr |
| RB | 0 | Chris Curry | So |
| OL | 71 | Braeden Daniels | So |
| WR | 25 | Jaylen Dixon | Jr |
| WR | 21 | Solomon Enis | Jr |
| TE | 46 | Hayden Erickson | Fr |
| OL | 61 | Kolinu'u Faaiu | Fr |
| OL | 72 | Luke Felix-Fualalo | Fr |
| OL | 55 | Nick Ford | Jr |
| TE | 89 | Cole Fotheringham | Jr |
| OL | 74 | Jaxon Garcia | Fr |
| OL | 79 | Alex Harrison | Fr |
| WR | 1 | Theo Howard | Sr |
| QB | 3 | Ja'Quinden Jackson | Fr |
| TE | 82 | Deven Johnson | Fr |
| OL | 59 | Falcon Kaumatule | Fr |
| TE | 86 | Dalton Kincaid | Jr |
| WR | 85 | Masaki Kudo | Fr |
| TE | 80 | Brant Kuithe | Jr |
| OL | 68 | Jaren Kump | Fr |
| OL | 78 | Sataoa Laumea | Fr |
| OL | 70 | Hunter Lotulelei | Fr |
| FB | 39 | Joe Ludwig | Jr |
| OL | 53 | Johnny Maea | So |
| OL | 54 | Paul Maile | So |
| WR | 13 | Munir McClain | So |
| OL | 62 | Michael Mokofisi | Fr |
| WR | 27 | Pierre Moudourou | Jr |
| TE | 40 | Ali'i Niumatalolo | Sr |
| OL | 77 | Bamidele Olaseni | Sr |
| WR | 81 | Connor O'Toole | Fr |
| WR | 10 | Money Parks | Fr |
| RB | 6 | Ricky Parks | Fr |
| RB | 5 | T. J. Pledger | Jr |
| TE | 84 | Taniela Pututau | Fr |
| WR | 19 | Bryson Reeves | Fr |
| QB | 7 | Cameron Rising | So |
| WR | 26 | Kyrese Rowan | Fr |
| OL | 64 | Marist Talavou | Fr |
| WR | 29 | Dawson Tanner | Fr |
| RB | 9 | Tavion Thomas | So |
| WR | 20 | Dominique Thompson | So |
| TE | 35 | Isaac Vaha | Fr |
| RB | 27 | Elvis Vakapuna | Fr |
| WR | 17 | Devaughn Vele | Fr |
| RB | 24 | Charlie Vincent | Fr |
| OL | 76 | Zereoue Williams | Fr |
| RB | 34 | Braedon Wissler | Fr |
| TE | 82 | Sire Woods | Sr |
| TE | 87 | Thomas Yassmin | So |

Defense

| Pos. | # | Name | Class |
|---|---|---|---|
| S | 38 | Stone Azarcon | Jr |
| DL | 91 | Jori Benson | Fr |
| S | 6 | Cole Bishop | Fr |
| LB | 56 | Rob Bonar | Fr |
| CB | 4 | JaTravis Broughton | So |
| LB | 10 | Ethan Calvert | Fr |
| LB | 34 | Josh Calvert | Fr |
| DE | 44 | Xavier Carlton | Fr |
| LB | 48 | Carson Danner | Fr |
| S | 9 | Vonte Davis | Sr |
| LB | 83 | Jonah Elliss | Fr |
| DE | 11 | Jonny Fanaika | Fr |
| DE | 7 | Van Fillinger | Fr |
| DT | 94 | Tevita Fotu | So |
| LB | 54 | Hayden Furey | So |
| CB | 29 | Nick Howe | Fr |
| S | 10 | R. J. Hubert | Jr |
| DT | 90 | Devin Kaufusi | Jr |
| LB | 46 | Lolani Langi | Fr |
| S | 13 | Kamo'i Latu | Fr |
| DT | 63 | Taka Lautaha | Fr |
| CB | 2 | Kenzel Lawler | Fr |
| LB | 0 | Devin Lloyd | Jr |
| CB | 29 | Elisha Lloyd | Fr |
| CB | 22 | Aaron Lowe | So |
| CB | 23 | Faybian Marks | Fr |
| LB | 55 | Andrew Mata'afa | So |
| CB | 15 | Malone Mataele | So |
| S | 28 | Brandon McKinney | Sr |
| LB | 20 | Jeremy Mercier | Jr |
| DE | 57 | Shuhei Mitsumoto | Fr |
| DT | 98 | Viane Moala | Sr |
| DE | 43 | Gavin Nawahine | Fr |
| DT | 91 | Tevita Pahulu | Fr |
| DT | 75 | Simote Pepa | Fr |
| CB | 8 | Clark Phillips III | Fr |
| CB | 31 | LaCarea Pleasant-Johnson | Fr |
| DT | 50 | Fua Pututau | So |
| DT | 41 | Hauati Pututau | Sr |
| DT | 99 | Tennessee Pututau | Fr |
| CB | 3 | Drew Rawls | Fr |
| LB | 32 | Karene Reid | Fr |
| S | 14 | Ben Renfro | Fr |
| LB | 37 | Trey Reynolds | Fr |
| CB | 5 | Caine Savage | Fr |
| LB | 1 | Nephi Sewell | Jr |
| DE | 49 | Elijah Shelton | So |
| S | 24 | Darrien Stewart | Fr |
| DE | 47 | Miki Suguturaga | Fr |
| DE | 42 | Mika Tafua | Jr |
| DT | 58 | Junior Tafuna | Fr |
| DT | 73 | Tanoa Togiai | Fr |
| LB | 52 | Mason Tufaga | Fr |
| LB | 45 | Sione Tuha | Fr |
| S | 16 | Zemaiah Vaughn | Fr |
| DT | 95 | Aliki Vimahi | Fr |
| DE | 12 | Tyler Wegis | Fr |
| S | 33 | Tyrone Young-Smith | Sr |

Special teams

| Pos. | # | Name | Class |
|---|---|---|---|
| LS | 57 | JT Greep | Fr |
| LS | 93 | Keegan Markgraf | Sr |
| K | 67 | Jordan Noyes | Fr |
| P | 33 | Cameron Peasley | Fr |
| K | 97 | Jadon Redding | So |
| P | 61 | Michael Williams | So |

Head coach

- Kyle Whittingham (BYU)

Coordinators/assistant coaches

- Morgan Scalley (Utah)
  Defensive coordinator/safeties
- Andy Ludwig (Portland State)
  Offensive coordinator/quarterbacks
- Jim Harding (Toledo)
  Assistant head coach/offensive line
- Chad Bumphis (Mississippi State)
  Wide receivers
- Kiel McDonald (Sacramento State)
  Running backs
- Sione Po'uha (Utah)
  Defensive tackles
- Lewis Powell (Utah)
  Defensive ends
- Sharrieff Shah (Utah)
  Cornerbacks/special teams coordinator
- Colton Swan (Weber State)
  Linebackers
- Freddie Whittingham (BYU)
  Tight ends/recruiting coordinator

Legend

- (C) Team captain
- (S) Suspended
- (I) Ineligible
- Injured
- Redshirt

Roster
Last update: September 17, 2021

== Game summaries ==
=== No. 6 (FCS) Weber State ===
Weber State at Utah

| Team | 1 | 2 | 3 | 4 | Total |
|---|---|---|---|---|---|
| No. 6 (FCS) Wildcats | 7 | 0 | 3 | 7 | 17 |
| • No. 24 Utes | 13 | 6 | 7 | 14 | 40 |

- Date: September 2, 2021
- Location: Rice–Eccles Stadium
  Salt Lake City, UT
- Game start: 5:31 p.m. MDT
- Elapsed time: 4 hours and 48 minutes
- Game attendance: 51,511
- Game weather: Temperature: 82 °F (28 °C) • Weather: Rain • Wind: NE 1 MPH
- Referee: Mike McCabe
- TV announcers (P12N): Roxy Bernstein (play–by–play) and Lincoln Kennedy (analyst)

Scoring summary
| 1 | 08:39 | UTAH | Jadon Redding 25–yard field goal (10 plays, 57 yards, 4:43) | UTAH 3–0 |
| 1 | 08:26 | WSU | Rashid Shaheed 100–yard kickoff return (Kyle Thompson kick) | WSU 7–3 |
| 1 | 06:07 | UTAH | Dalton Kincaid 17–yard pass from Charlie Brewer (Jadon Redding kick) (5 plays, 75 yards, 2:19) | UTAH 10–7 |
| 1 | 02:53 | UTAH | Jadon Redding 31–yard field goal (4 plays, 4 yards, 1:29) | UTAH 13–7 |
| 2 | 12:04 | UTAH | Tavion Thomas 12–yard run (Jadon Redding kick failed) (3 plays, 31 yards, 1:08) | UTAH 19–7 |
| 3 | 10:31 | WSU | Kyle Thompson 25–yard field goal (7 plays, 24 yards, 3:44) | UTAH 19–10 |
| 3 | 04:27 | UTAH | Solomon Enis 8–yard pass from Charlie Brewer (Jadon Redding kick) (5 plays, 66 yards, 2:58) | UTAH 26–10 |
| 4 | 08:44 | UTAH | Tavion Thomas 14–yard run (Jadon Redding kick) (3 plays, 42 yards, 1:28) | UTAH 33–10 |
| 4 | 07:49 | UTAH | Dalton Kincaid 11–yard pass from Cameron Rising (Jadon Redding kick) (2 plays, 29 yards, 0:38) | UTAH 40–10 |
| 4 | 02:43 | WSU | Hayden Meacham 2–yard pass from Bronson Barron (Kyle Thompson kick) (12 plays, 75 yards, 5:06) | UTAH 40–17 |

| Statistics | Weber State | Utah |
|---|---|---|
| First downs | 14 | 28 |
| Total yards | 270 | 450 |
| Rushing yards | 57 | 188 |
| Passing yards | 213 | 262 |
| Turnovers | 3 | 3 |
| Time of possession | 30:24 | 29:36 |

| Team | Category | Player | Statistics |
|---|---|---|---|
| Weber State | Passing | Bronson Barron | 21/33, 213 yards, 1 TD, 1 INT |
| Weber State | Rushing | Dontae McMillan | 7 carries, 39 yards |
| Weber State | Receiving | Justin Malone | 5 receptions, 50 yards |
| Utah | Passing | Charlie Brewer | 19/27, 233 yards, 2 TDs, 1 INT |
| Utah | Rushing | Tavion Thomas | 12 carries, 107 yards, 2 TDs |
| Utah | Receiving | Dalton Kincaid | 4 receptions, 75 yards, 2 TDs |

=== At BYU ===
Utah at BYU
(Holy War)

| Team | 1 | 2 | 3 | 4 | Total |
|---|---|---|---|---|---|
| No. 21 Utes | 0 | 7 | 0 | 10 | 17 |
| • Cougars | 3 | 13 | 7 | 3 | 26 |

- Date: September 11, 2021
- Location: LaVell Edwards Stadium
  Provo, UT
- Game start: 8:25 p.m. MDT
- Elapsed time: 3 hours and 21 minutes
- Game attendance: 63,470
- Game weather: Temperature: 70 °F (21 °C) • Weather: Sunny • Wind: NNW 3 mph
- Referee: Chris Coyte
- TV announcers (ESPN): Dave Flemming (play–by–play), Rod Gilmore (analyst) and Alex Chappell (sideline)

Scoring summary
| 1 | 04:15 | BYU | Jacob Oldroyd 37–yard field goal (7 plays, 23 yards, 2:56) | BYU 3–0 |
| 2 | 10:37 | BYU | Neil Pau'u 4–yard pass from Jaren Hall (Jacob Oldroyd kick) (14 plays, 72 yards, 7:19) | BYU 10–0 |
| 2 | 07:22 | UTAH | Brant Kuithe 20–yard pass from Charlie Brewer (Jadon Redding kick) (6 plays, 80 yards, 3:15) | BYU 10–7 |
| 2 | 00:04 | BYU | Samson Nacua 2–yard pass from Jaren Hall (Jacob Oldroyd kick failed) (11 plays, 93 yards, 3:10) | BYU 16–7 |
| 3 | 00:38 | BYU | Gunner Romney 4–yard pass from Jaren Hall (Jacob Oldroyd kick) (10 plays, 69 yards, 3:57) | BYU 23–7 |
| 4 | 14:07 | UTAH | Jadon Redding 47–yard field goal (5 plays, 46 yards, 1:31) | BYU 23–10 |
| 4 | 09:31 | UTAH | Micah Bernard 22–yard run (Jadon Redding kick) (5 plays, 55 yards, 2:15) | BYU 23–17 |
| 4 | 03:17 | BYU | Jacob Oldroyd 21–yard field goal (12 plays, 71 yards, 6:14) | BYU 26–17 |

| Statistics | Utah | BYU |
|---|---|---|
| First downs | 15 | 21 |
| Total yards | 340 | 373 |
| Rushing yards | 193 | 224 |
| Passing yards | 147 | 149 |
| Turnovers | 2 | 1 |
| Time of possession | 24:34 | 35:26 |

| Team | Category | Player | Statistics |
|---|---|---|---|
| Utah | Passing | Charlie Brewer | 15/26, 147 yards, 1 TD, 1 INT |
| Utah | Rushing | Micah Bernard | 12 carries, 146 yards, 1 TD |
| Utah | Receiving | Dalton Kincaid | 1 reception, 37 yards |
| BYU | Passing | Jaren Hall | 18/30, 149 yards, 3 TDs |
| BYU | Rushing | Tyler Allgeier | 27 carries, 102 yards |
| BYU | Receiving | Puka Nacua | 4 receptions, 37 yards |

=== At San Diego State ===
Utah at San Diego State

| Team | 1 | 2 | 3 | 4 | OT | Total |
|---|---|---|---|---|---|---|
| Utes | 7 | 3 | 0 | 14 | 7 | 31 |
| • Aztecs | 3 | 7 | 14 | 0 | 9 | 33 |

- Date: September 18, 2021
- Location: Dignity Health Sports Park
  Carson, CA
- Game start: 4:08 p.m. PDT
- Elapsed time: 3 hours and 54 minutes
- Game attendance: 11,090
- Game weather: Temperature: 69 °F (21 °C) • Weather: Sunny • Wind: N 6 MPH
- Referee: Jim Wharrie
- TV announcers (CBSSN): Dave Ryan (play–by–play), Aaron Murray (analyst) and Amanda Guerra (sideline)

Scoring summary
| 1 | 08:02 | UTAH | Britain Covey 80–yard punt return (Jadon Redding kick) | UTAH 7–0 |
| 1 | 01:54 | SDSU | Matt Araiza 51–yard field goal (8 plays, 29 yards, 3:20) () | UTAH 7–3 |
| 2 | 07:51 | UTAH | Jadon Redding 43–yard field goal (13 plays, 58 yards, 5:02) | UTAH 10–3 |
| 2 | 07:38 | SDSU | Jordan Byrd 100–yard kickoff return (Matt Araiza kick) | TIE 10–10 |
| 3 | 11:24 | SDSU | Greg Bell 7–yard run (Matt Araiza kick) (8 plays, 82 yards, 3:31) | SDSU 17–10 |
| 3 | 10:42 | SDSU | Greg Bell 7–yard run (Matt Araiza kick) (1 play, 7 yards, 0:04) | SDSU 24–10 |
| 4 | 04:17 | UTAH | Britain Covey 2–yard pass from Cameron Rising (Jadon Redding kick failed) (10 plays, 63 yards, 2:16) | SDSU 24–16 |
| 4 | 00:16 | UTAH | Theo Howard 4–yard pass from Cameron Rising (Solomon Enis pass) (13 plays, 74 yards, 2:20) | TIE 24–24 |
| OT | 00:00 | SDSU | Jay Rudolph 2–yard pass from Lucas Johnson (Matt Araiza kick) (2 plays, 25 yards, 0:00) | SDSU 31–24 |
| OT | 00:00 | UTAH | Jaylen Dixon 25–yard pass from Cameron Rising (Jadon Redding kick) (1 play, 25 yards, 0:00) | TIE 31–31 |
| OT | 00:00 | SDSU | Lucas Johnson 0–yard pass from Jesse Matthews (1 play, 0 yards, 0:00) | SDSU 33–31 |

| Statistics | Utah | San Diego State |
|---|---|---|
| First downs | 21 | 12 |
| Total yards | 327 | 248 |
| Rushing yards | 70 | 204 |
| Passing yards | 257 | 44 |
| Turnovers | 1 | 2 |
| Time of possession | 30:19 | 29:41 |

| Team | Category | Player | Statistics |
|---|---|---|---|
| Utah | Passing | Cameron Rising | 19/32, 153 yards, 3 TDs |
| Utah | Rushing | Micah Bernard | 17 carries, 47 yards |
| Utah | Receiving | Brant Kuithe | 7 receptions, 58 yards |
| San Diego State | Passing | Lucas Johnson | 10/19, 44 yards, 1 TD |
| San Diego State | Rushing | Greg Bell | 33 carries, 119 yards, 2 TDs |
| San Diego State | Receiving | Daniel Bellinger | 1 reception, 15 yards |

=== Washington State ===
Washington State at Utah

| Team | 1 | 2 | 3 | 4 | Total |
|---|---|---|---|---|---|
| Cougars | 0 | 6 | 7 | 0 | 13 |
| • Utes | 0 | 7 | 3 | 14 | 24 |

- Date: September 25, 2021
- Location: Rice–Eccles Stadium
  Salt Lake City, UT
- Game start: 12:31 p.m. MDT
- Elapsed time: 3 hours and 10 minutes
- Game attendance: 51,483
- Game weather: Temperature: 77 °F (25 °C) • Weather: Sunny • Wind: W 3 MPH
- Referee: Stephen Strimling
- TV announcers (P12N): Roxy Bernstein (play–by–play) and Lincoln Kennedy (analyst)

Scoring summary
| 2 | 10:34 | WSU | Dean Janikowski 39–yard field goal (11 plays, 58 yards, 5:55) | WSU 3–0 |
| 2 | 04:14 | UTAH | Ja'Quinden Jackson 2–yard run (Jadon Redding kick) (6 plays, 80 yards, 2:18) | UTAH 7–3 |
| 2 | 00:00 | WSU | Dean Janikowski 20–yard field goal (13 plays, 71 yards, 4:14) | UTAH 7–6 |
| 3 | 13:40 | WSU | De'Zhaun Stribling 26–yard pass from Jarrett Guarantano (Dean Janikowski kick) (2 plays, 21 yards, 1:15) | WSU 13–7 |
| 3 | 09:15 | UTAH | Jadon Redding 28–yard field goal (12 plays, 64 yards, 4:25) | WSU 13–10 |
| 4 | 04:43 | UTAH | T.J. Pledger 20–yard run (Jordan Noyes kick) (8 plays, 72 yards, 3:59) | UTAH 17–13 |
| 4 | 02:19 | UTAH | Clark Phillips III 54–yard interception return (Jordan Noyes kick) | UTAH 24–13 |

| Statistics | Washington State | Utah |
|---|---|---|
| First downs | 22 | 19 |
| Total yards | 318 | 349 |
| Rushing yards | 70 | 212 |
| Passing yards | 248 | 137 |
| Turnovers | 0 | 10 |
| Time of possession | 36:53 | 23:07 |

| Team | Category | Player | Statistics |
|---|---|---|---|
| Washington State | Passing | Jarrett Guarantano | 25/36, 248 yards, 1 TD, 3 INTs |
| Washington State | Rushing | Deon McIntosh | 13 carries, 59 yards |
| Washington State | Receiving | De'Zhaun Stribling | 6 receptions, 93 yards, 1 TD |
| Utah | Passing | Cameron Rising | 13/23, 137 yards |
| Utah | Rushing | T.J. Pledger | 10 carries, 117 yards, 1 TD |
| Utah | Receiving | Cole Fotheringham | 3 receptions, 33 yards |

=== At USC ===
Utah at USC

| Team | 1 | 2 | 3 | 4 | Total |
|---|---|---|---|---|---|
| • Utes | 7 | 14 | 14 | 7 | 42 |
| Trojans | 3 | 7 | 0 | 16 | 26 |

- Date: October 9, 2021
- Location: Los Angeles Memorial Coliseum
  Los Angeles, CA
- Game start: 5:00 p.m. PDT
- Game attendance: 54,088
- Game weather: Temperature: 70 °F (21 °C) • Weather: Sunny
- Referee: Francisco Villar
- TV announcers (Fox): Tim Brando (play–by–play) and Spencer Tillman (analyst)

Scoring summary
| 1 | 3:58 | USC | Parker Lewis 28-yard field goal (12 plays, 53 yards, 5:26) | USC 3–0 |
| 1 | 0:46 | UTAH | Brant Kuithe 11-yard run (Jordan Noyes kick) (8 plays, 75 yards, 3:31) | UTAH 7–3 |
| 2 | 6:49 | USC | Drake London 20-yard pass from Kedon Slovis (Parker Lewis kick) (6 plays, 50 yards, 2:29) | USC 10–7 |
| 2 | 4:41 | UTAH | Money Parks 12–yard pass from Cameron Rising (Jordan Noyes kick) (5 plays, 75 yards, 2:05) | UTAH 14–10 |
| 2 | 0:17 | UTAH | Devaughn Vele 37-yard pass from Cameron Rising (Jordan Noyes kick) (7 plays, 77 yards, 0:57) | UTAH 21–10 |
| 3 | 13:24 | WSU | Tavion Thomas 43-yard run (Jordan Noyes kick) (5 plays, 75 yards, 2:19) | UTAH 28–10 |
| 3 | 9:58 | UTAH | Cameron Rising 17-yard run (Jordan Noyes kick) (4 plays, 40 yards, 1:42) | UTAH 35–10 |
| 4 | 10:27 | UTAH | Vavae Malepeai 2-yard run (2-point pass complete) (9 plays, 85 yards, 2:49) | UTAH 35–18 |
| 4 | 6:20 | UTAH | Dalton Kincaid 1-yard pass from Cameron Rising (Jordan Noyes kick) (7 plays, 50 yards, 4:30) | UTAH 42–18 |
| 4 | 1:19 | UTAH | Malcolm Epps 41-yard pass from Kedon Slovis (2-point pass complete) (5 plays, 70 yards, 1:10) | UTAH 42–26 |

| Statistics | Utah | USC |
|---|---|---|
| First downs | 23 | 27 |
| Total yards | 486 | 493 |
| Rushing yards | 180 | 92 |
| Passing yards | 306 | 401 |
| Turnovers | 0 | 1 |
| Time of possession | 28:50 | 31:10 |

| Team | Category | Player | Statistics |
|---|---|---|---|
| Utah | Passing | Cameron Rising | 22/28, 306 yards, 3 TDs |
| Utah | Rushing | Tavion Thomas | 16 carries, 113 yards, 1 TD |
| Utah | Receiving | Devaughn Vele | 4 receptions, 84 yards, 1 TD |
| USC | Passing | Kedon Slovis | 33/53, 401 yards, 2 TDs, 1 INT |
| USC | Rushing | Keaontay Ingram | 14 carries, 70 yards |
| USC | Receiving | Drake London | 16 receptions, 162 yards, 1 TD |

=== No. 18 Arizona State ===
Arizona State at Utah

| Team | 1 | 2 | 3 | 4 | Total |
|---|---|---|---|---|---|
| No. 18 Sun Devils | 7 | 14 | 0 | 0 | 21 |
| • Utes | 7 | 0 | 14 | 7 | 28 |

- Date: October 16, 2021
- Location: Rice–Eccles Stadium
  Salt Lake City, UT
- Game start: 8:00 p.m. MDT
- Game attendance: 51,724
- Referee: Chris Coyte
- TV announcers (ESPN): Dave Flemming, Rod Gilmore, Stormy Buonantony

| Statistics | Arizona State | Utah |
|---|---|---|
| First downs | 20 | 29 |
| Total yards | 385 | 455 |
| Rushing yards | 148 | 208 |
| Passing yards | 237 | 247 |
| Turnovers | 1 | 2 |
| Time of possession | 28:23 | 31:37 |

| Team | Category | Player | Statistics |
|---|---|---|---|
| Arizona State | Passing | Jayden Daniels | 20/31, 237 yards, 2 TDs |
| Arizona State | Rushing | Rachaad White | 9 carries, 56 yards |
| Arizona State | Receiving | Curtis Hodges | 4 receptions, 74 yards, 1 TD |
| Utah | Passing | Cameron Rising | 21/33, 247 yards, 2 TDs, 2 INTs |
| Utah | Rushing | Tavion Thomas | 20 carries, 84 yards, 1 TD |
| Utah | Receiving | Devaughn Vele | 3 receptions, 57 yards |

=== At Oregon State ===
Utah at Oregon State

| Team | 1 | 2 | 3 | 4 | Total |
|---|---|---|---|---|---|
| Utes | 14 | 10 | 7 | 3 | 34 |
| • Beavers | 7 | 7 | 21 | 7 | 42 |

- Date: October 23, 2021
- Location: Reser Stadium
  Corvallis, OR
- Game start: 5:00 p.m. PDT
- Game attendance: 30,203
- Game weather: Temperature: 55 °F (13 °C) • Weather: Sunny • Wind: 8 MPH
- Referee: Michael Mothershed
- TV announcers (P12N): Ted Robinson, Yogi Roth

| Statistics | Utah | Oregon State |
|---|---|---|
| First downs | 28 | 22 |
| Total yards | 455 | 468 |
| Rushing yards | 188 | 260 |
| Passing yards | 267 | 208 |
| Turnovers | 0 | 1 |
| Time of possession | 32:25 | 27:35 |

| Team | Category | Player | Statistics |
|---|---|---|---|
| Utah | Passing | Cameron Rising | 22/36, 267 yards, 2 TDs |
| Utah | Rushing | Tavion Thomas | 21 carries, 74 yards, 2 TDs |
| Utah | Receiving | Devaughn Vele | 3 receptions, 69 yards |
| Oregon State | Passing | Chance Nolan | 14/19, 208 yards, 2 TDs |
| Oregon State | Rushing | B. J. Baylor | 19 carries, 152 yards, 1 TD |
| Oregon State | Receiving | Trevon Bradford | 6 receptions, 74 yards, 1 TD |

=== UCLA ===
UCLA at Utah

| Team | 1 | 2 | 3 | 4 | Total |
|---|---|---|---|---|---|
| Bruins | 3 | 7 | 7 | 7 | 24 |
| • Utes | 7 | 21 | 0 | 16 | 44 |

- Date: October 30, 2021
- Location: Rice–Eccles Stadium
  Salt Lake City, UT
- Game start: 8:00 p.m. MDT
- Game attendance: 51,922
- Game weather: Temperature: 54 °F (12 °C) • Weather: Clear
- Referee: Mike McCabe
- TV announcers (ESPN): Dave Flemming, Rod Gilmore, Stormy Buonantony

Scoring summary
| 1 | 11:26 | UTAH | Tavion Thomas 10-yard run (Jordan Noyes kick) (9 plays, 75 yards, 3:34) | UTAH 7–0 |
| 1 | 3:48 | UCLA | Nicholas Barr-Mira 28-yard field goal (16 plays, 65 yards, 7:38) | UTAH 7–3 |
| 2 | 14:55 | UTAH | Tavion Thomas 8-yard run (Jordan Noyes kick) (10 plays, 75 yards, 3:53) | UTAH 14–3 |
| 2 | 9:06 | UCLA | Zach Charbonnet 30-yard run (Nicholas Barr-Mira kick) (12 plays, 75 yards, 5:49) | UTAH 14–10 |
| 2 | 5:51 | UTAH | Dalton Kincaid 4-yard pass from Cameron Rising (Jordan Noyes kick) (7 plays, 75 yards, 3:15) | UTAH 21–10 |
| 2 | 4:27 | UTAH | Tavion Thomas 10-yard run (Jadon Redding kick) (2 plays, 17 yards, 0:35) | UTAH 28–10 |
| 3 | 4:59 | UCLA | Michael Ezeike 6-yard pass from Ethan Garbers (Nicholas Barr-Mira kick) (6 plays, 91 yards, 1:52) | UTAH 28–17 |
| 4 | 14:55 | UTAH | Cameron Rising 12-yard run (Jadon Redding kick) (11 plays, 75 yards, 5:04) | UTAH 35–17 |
| 4 | 11:04 | UCLA | Greg Dulcich 9-yard pass from Ethan Garbers (Nicholas Barr-Mira kick) (10 plays, 75 yards, 3:51) | UTAH 35–24 |
| 4 | 7:16 | UTAH | Ethan Garbers tackled in the end zone for a safety | UTAH 37–24 |
| 4 | 4:27 | UTAH | Tavion Thomas 24-yard run (Jadon Redding kick) (7 plays, 58 yards, 2:34) | UTAH 44–24 |

| Statistics | UCLA | Utah |
|---|---|---|
| First downs | 24 | 26 |
| Total yards | 411 | 469 |
| Rushing yards | 146 | 290 |
| Passing yards | 265 | 179 |
| Turnovers | 1 | 0 |
| Time of possession | 29:13 | 30:47 |

| Team | Category | Player | Statistics |
|---|---|---|---|
| UCLA | Passing | Ethan Garbers | 27/44, 265 yards, 2 TDs, 1 INT |
| UCLA | Rushing | Zach Charbonnet | 11 carries, 65 yards, 1 TD |
| UCLA | Receiving | Kyle Philips | 7 receptions, 86 yards |
| Utah | Passing | Cameron Rising | 17/27, 179 yards, 1 TD |
| Utah | Rushing | Tavion Thomas | 24 carries, 160 yards, 4 TDs |
| Utah | Receiving | Brant Kuithe | 5 receptions, 63 yards |

=== At Stanford ===
Utah at Stanford

| Team | 1 | 2 | 3 | 4 | Total |
|---|---|---|---|---|---|
| • Utes | 14 | 24 | 0 | 14 | 52 |
| Cardinal | 0 | 0 | 7 | 0 | 7 |

- Date: November 5, 2021
- Location: Stanford Stadium
  Stanford, CA
- Game start: 7:30 p.m. PDT
- Game attendance: 26,410
- Game weather: Temperature: 58 °F (14 °C) • Weather: Cloudy
- Referee: Francisco Villar
- TV announcers (FS1): Alex Faust, Petros Papadakis

Scoring summary
| 1 | 10:57 | UTAH | Tavion Thomas 10-yard run (Jadon Redding kick) (9 plays, 65 yards, 4:03) | UTAH 7–0 |
| 1 | 6:15 | UTAH | Tavion Thomas 5-yard run (Jadon Redding kick) (6 plays, 68 yards, 2:33) | UTAH 14–0 |
| 2 | 14:31 | UTAH | Tavion Thomas 58-yard run (Jadon Redding kick) (1 play, 58 yards, 0:12) | UTAH 21–0 |
| 2 | 6:37 | UTAH | Tavion Thomas 11-yard run (Jadon Redding kick) (10 plays, 90 yards, 4:17) | UTAH 28–0 |
| 2 | 3:10 | UTAH | TJ Pledger 96-yard run (Jadon Redding kick) (1 play, 96 yards, 0:16) | UTAH 35–0 |
| 2 | 0:00 | UTAH | Jadon Redding 29-yard field goal (9 plays, 52 yards, 1:07) | UTAH 38–0 |
| 3 | 10:14 | STAN | Isaiah Sanders 4-yard run (Joshua Karty kick) (9 plays, 56 yards, 4:46) | UTAH 38–7 |
| 4 | 12:11 | UTAH | Devin Lloyd 2-yard interception return (Jadon Redding kick) (9 plays, 56 yards, 4:46) | UTAH 45–7 |
| 4 | 1:48 | UTAH | Micah Bernard 11-yard run (Jadon Redding kick) (9 plays, 65 yards, 5:18) | UTAH 52–7 |

| Statistics | Utah | Stanford |
|---|---|---|
| First downs | 31 | 11 |
| Total yards | 581 | 167 |
| Rushing yards | 441 | 82 |
| Passing yards | 140 | 85 |
| Turnovers | 1 | 2 |
| Time of possession | 30:22 | 29:38 |

| Team | Category | Player | Statistics |
|---|---|---|---|
| Utah | Passing | Cameron Rising | 13/22, 140 yards |
| Utah | Rushing | Tavion Thomas | 20 carries, 177 yards, 4 TDs |
| Utah | Receiving | Micah Bernard | 2 receptions, 32 yards |
| Stanford | Passing | Jack West | 12/18, 59 yards, 1 INT |
| Stanford | Rushing | E. J. Smith | 7 carries, 53 yards |
| Stanford | Receiving | Benjamin Yurosek | 4 receptions, 42 yards |

=== At Arizona ===
Utah at Arizona

| Team | 1 | 2 | 3 | 4 | Total |
|---|---|---|---|---|---|
| • No. 24 Utes | 7 | 14 | 10 | 7 | 38 |
| Wildcats | 14 | 3 | 3 | 9 | 29 |

- Date: November 13, 2021
- Location: Arizona Stadium
  Tucson, AZ
- Game start: 12:10 p.m. MST
- Game attendance: 32,008
- Game weather: Temperature: 81 °F (27 °C) • Weather: Sunny
- Referee: Chris Coyte
- TV announcers (P12N): Roxy Bernstein, Lincoln Kennedy

| Statistics | Utah | Arizona |
|---|---|---|
| First downs | 26 | 16 |
| Total yards | 468 | 329 |
| Rushing yards | 174 | 102 |
| Passing yards | 294 | 227 |
| Turnovers | 0 | 0 |
| Time of possession | 33:53 | 26:07 |

| Team | Category | Player | Statistics |
|---|---|---|---|
| Utah | Passing | Cameron Rising | 19/30, 294 yards, 2 TDs |
| Utah | Rushing | T. J. Pledger | 25 carries, 119 yards, 2 TDs |
| Utah | Receiving | Micah Bernard | 3 receptions, 60 yards |
| Arizona | Passing | Will Plummer | 19/34, 223 yards, 1 TD |
| Arizona | Rushing | Will Plummer | 10 carries, 50 yards, 1 TD |
| Arizona | Receiving | Dorian Singer | 5 receptions, 84 yards |

=== No. 3 Oregon ===
Oregon at Utah

| Team | 1 | 2 | 3 | 4 | Total |
|---|---|---|---|---|---|
| No. 3 Ducks | 0 | 0 | 7 | 0 | 7 |
| • No. 23 Utes | 7 | 21 | 7 | 3 | 38 |

- Date: November 20, 2021
- Location: Rice–Eccles Stadium
  Salt Lake City, UT
- Game start: 5:30 p.m. MST
- Game attendance: 52,724
- Referee: Mike McCabe
- TV announcers (ABC): Sean McDonough, Todd Blackledge, Molly McGrath

| Statistics | Oregon | Utah |
|---|---|---|
| First downs | 18 | 24 |
| Total yards | 294 | 386 |
| Rushing yards | 63 | 208 |
| Passing yards | 231 | 178 |
| Turnovers | 0 | 0 |
| Time of possession | 24:33 | 35:27 |

| Team | Category | Player | Statistics |
|---|---|---|---|
| Oregon | Passing | Anthony Brown | 17/35, 231 yards, 1 TD |
| Oregon | Rushing | Byron Cardwell | 7 carries, 35 yards |
| Oregon | Receiving | Kris Hutson | 4 receptions, 96 yards |
| Utah | Passing | Cameron Rising | 10/18, 178 yards |
| Utah | Rushing | Tavion Thomas | 21 carries, 94 yards, 3 TDs |
| Utah | Receiving | Brant Kuithe | 5 receptions, 118 yards |

=== Colorado ===
Colorado at Utah
(Rumble in the Rockies)

| Team | 1 | 2 | 3 | 4 | Total |
|---|---|---|---|---|---|
| Buffaloes | 3 | 3 | 7 | 0 | 13 |
| • No. 19 Utes | 0 | 14 | 14 | 0 | 28 |

- Date: November 26, 2021
- Location: Rice–Eccles Stadium
  Salt Lake City, UT
- Game start: 2:00 p.m. MST
- Game attendance: 51,538
- Referee: Francisco Villar
- TV announcers (FOX): Joe Davis, Brock Huard

| Statistics | Colorado | Utah |
|---|---|---|
| First downs | 9 | 23 |
| Total yards | 148 | 444 |
| Rushing yards | 64 | 265 |
| Passing yards | 84 | 179 |
| Turnovers | 0 | 1 |
| Time of possession | 25:53 | 34:07 |

| Team | Category | Player | Statistics |
|---|---|---|---|
| Colorado | Passing | Brendon Lewis | 9/23, 84 yards |
| Colorado | Rushing | Alex Fontenot | 10 carries, 28 yards |
| Colorado | Receiving | Dimitri Stanley | 3 receptions, 48 yards |
| Utah | Passing | Cameron Rising | 14/23, 179 yards, 3 TDs, 1 INT |
| Utah | Rushing | Tavion Thomas | 25 carries, 142 yards, 1 TD |
| Utah | Receiving | Britain Covey | 5 receptions, 72 yards, 1 TD |

=== Vs. No. 10 Oregon (Pac-12 Championship game) ===
2021 Pac-12 Football Championship Game presented by 76

| Team | 1 | 2 | 3 | 4 | Total |
|---|---|---|---|---|---|
| No. 10 Ducks | 0 | 0 | 3 | 7 | 10 |
| • No. 17 Utes | 14 | 9 | 8 | 7 | 38 |

- Date: December 3, 2021
- Location: Allegiant Stadium
  Las Vegas, Nevada
- Game start: 6:00 p.m. MST
- Game attendance: 56,511
- Game weather: n/a (game played indoors)
- Referee: Steven Strimling
- TV announcers (ABC): Chris Fowler, Kirk Herbstreit, Holly Rowe

| Statistics | Oregon | Utah |
|---|---|---|
| First downs | 14 | 21 |
| Total yards | 221 | 361 |
| Rushing yards | 74 | 191 |
| Passing yards | 147 | 170 |
| Turnovers | 2 | 2 |
| Time of possession | 27:56 | 32:04 |

| Team | Category | Player | Statistics |
|---|---|---|---|
| Oregon | Passing | Anthony Brown | 13/24, 147 yards, 2 INTs |
| Oregon | Rushing | Travis Dye | 15 carries, 82 yards, 2 TDs |
| Oregon | Receiving | Isaah Crocker | 3 receptions, 51 yards |
| Utah | Passing | Cameron Rising | 15/24, 170 yards, 1 TD, 2 INTs |
| Utah | Rushing | Tavion Thomas | 18 carries, 63 yards, 1 TD |
| Utah | Receiving | Britain Covey | 5 receptions, 72 yards |

=== Vs. No. 6 Ohio State (Rose Bowl) ===
Rose Bowl Game presented by Capital One Venture X

| Team | 1 | 2 | 3 | 4 | Total |
|---|---|---|---|---|---|
| No. 12 Utes | 14 | 21 | 3 | 7 | 45 |
| • No. 6 Buckeyes | 0 | 21 | 10 | 17 | 48 |

- Date: January 1, 2022
- Location: Rose Bowl
  Pasadena, California
- Game start: 2:00 p.m. PST
- Game attendance: 87,842
- Game weather: Sunny • Temperature: 60 °F (16 °C) • Wind: NE 2 mph (3.2 km/h)
- Referee: Jason Autrey
- TV announcers (ESPN): Chris Fowler (play-by-play), Kirk Herbstreit (analyst), Holly Rowe and Tiffany Blackmon (sidelines)

| Statistics | Utah | Ohio State |
|---|---|---|
| First downs | 25 | 28 |
| Total yards | 463 | 683 |
| Rushing yards | 226 | 110 |
| Passing yards | 237 | 573 |
| Turnovers | 1 | 2 |
| Time of possession | 34:17 | 25:43 |

| Team | Category | Player | Statistics |
|---|---|---|---|
| Utah | Passing | Cameron Rising | 17/22, 214 yards, 2 TDs |
| Utah | Rushing | Cameron Rising | 11 carries, 92 yards, 1 TD |
| Utah | Receiving | Brant Kuithe | 6 receptions, 77 yards |
| Ohio State | Passing | C. J. Stroud | 37/46, 573 yards, 6 TDs, 1 INT |
| Ohio State | Rushing | TreVeyon Henderson | 17 carries, 83 yards |
| Ohio State | Receiving | Jaxon Smith-Njigba | 15 receptions, 347 yards, 3 TDs |

== Awards and honors ==
- September 7, 2021 – Devin Lloyd, Pac-12 Conference Defensive Player of the Week
