= 2026 Big 12 Championship Game =

2026 Edward Jones Big 12 Championship Game
	Utah Utes
(–)	(11–0)
	Head coach: Morgan Scalley
- Date: December 4, 2026
- Season: 2026
- Stadium: AT&T Stadium
- Location: Arlington, Texas

United States TV coverage
- Network: ABC; ESPN+ ESPN Radio
- Announcers: ABC/ESPN+: (play-by-play), (analyst), and [ (sideline reporters); ESPN Radio: (play-by-play), (analyst), and (sideline reporter)

2026 Big 12 Conference football standings
	Conf.			Overall
Team	W		L	W		L
No. 2 Utah y	8	–	0	11	–	0
No. 12 Texas Tech	7	–	1	10	–	1
No. 10 BYU	6	–	2	9	–	2
No. 19 Arizona	5	–	3	8	–	3
No. 20 Houston	5	–	3	8	–	3
Oklahoma State	5	–	3	7	–	4
Baylor	4	–	4	6	–	5
Arizona State	4	–	4	6	–	5
UCF	4	–	4	6	–	5
Iowa State	3	–	5	5	–	6
TCU	3	–	5	5	–	6
Cincinnati	3	–	5	6	–	5
Kansas	2	–	6	4	–	7
West Virginia	2	–	6	5	–	6
Colorado	2	–	6	4	–	7
Kansas State	1	–	7	4	–	7
Championship: TBD vs. Utah
^ – College Football Playoff participant; $ – Conference champion; y – Championship game participant; As of November 22, 2026; Rankings from CFP rankings

The 2026 Big 12 Championship Game is a college football game played on December 4, 2026, at AT&T Stadium in Arlington, Texas. It will be the 25th and final edition of the Big 12 Championship Game and will determine the champion of the Big 12 Conference for the 2026 season. The game will air on ABC at 7:00 CST. The game will feature the top two teams from the conference following the regular season, with the winner earning an automatic bid in the 2026–27 College Football Playoff.

== Overview ==
On November 9, 2026, ESPN, who broadcast the Big 12 Championship Game on ABC, and the College Football Playoff announced that the Playoff would expand to 24 teams beginning with the 2027–28 Playoff, removing the conference championship games of the Power 4 conferences (the ACC, Big Ten, SEC and Big 12) in the process. As of now, the 2026 Big 12 Championship Game will be its planned final edition; the game previously took a hiatus from 2010 to 2017 as the conference fell below 12 members, which was required for such a game at the time.

=== Team selection ===
Due to the conference having have imbalanced schedules, the conference will continue to use tiebreaking scenarios created before the 2025−26 season.

==== Two-team tiebreaker ====
1. The tied teams will be compared based on their head-to-head record during the season.
2. The tied teams will be compared based on win percentage against all common conference opponents.
3. The tied teams will be compared based on win percentage against the next highest-placed common opponent in the standings (based on the record in all games played within the Conference) proceeding through the standings.
4. The tied teams will be compared based on combined win percentage in conference games of conference opponents.
5. The tied teams will be compared based on total number of wins in a 12-game season.
6. The representative will be chosen based on highest ranking by SportSource Analytics (team rating score metric) following the last weekend of regular-season games.
7. The representative will be chosen by a coin toss.

==== Multiple-team tiebreaker ====
1. The records of the three (or more) tied teams will be compared based on winning percentage in games among the tied teams:
A. If all teams involved in the tie did not play each other, but one team defeated all other teams involved in the tie, the team that defeated all other teams in the tie is removed from the tiebreaker, and the remaining teams revert to the beginning of the applicable tiebreaker process (i.e., two team or three or more team tie).
B. If all teams involved in the tie did not play each other and no team defeated all other teams involved in the tie, move to the next step in tiebreaker.
2. The records of the three (or more) tied teams will be compared based on winning percentage against all common conference opponents played by all other teams involved in the tie.
3. Record of the three (or more) tied teams against the next highest placed common opponent in the standings (based on the record in all games played within the conference), proceeding through the standings. When arriving at another group of tied teams while comparing records, use each team’s win percentage against the collective tied teams as a group (prior to that group’s own tie-breaking procedure) rather than the performance against individual tied teams.
4. Record of the three (or more) tied teams based on combined win percentage in conference games of conference opponents (i.e., strength of conference schedule)
5. Total number of wins in a 12-game season. The following conditions will apply to the calculation of the total number of wins: Only one win against a team from the NCAA Football Championship Subdivision or lower division will be counted annually. Any games that are exempted from counting against the annual maximum number of football contests per NCAA rules. (Current Bylaw 17.10.5.2.1) shall not be included.
6. Highest ranking by SportSource Analytics (team Rating Score metric) following the last weekend of regular-season games.
7. Coin toss

== Game summary ==
=== Scoring summary ===
2026 Big 12 Championship Game
TBD vs. Utah Utes

Quarter	1	2	3	4	Total
TBD	0	0	0	0	0
Utah	0	0	0	0	0

at AT&T Stadium • Arlington, Texas

- Date: Friday, December 4, 2026
- Game time: 7:00 p.m. CST
- Game weather: Indoor (retractable roof closed)
- TV: ABC

Game information
First quarter

Second quarter Third quarter Fourth quarter

Statistics		UTAH
First downs		
Plays–yards	–	–
Rushes–yards	–	–
Passing yards		
Passing: comp–att–int	––	––
Turnovers		
Time of possession		

Team	Category	Player	Statistics
	Passing		
	Rushing		
	Receiving		
Utah	Passing		
Utah	Rushing		
Utah	Receiving		

== See also ==
- List of Big 12 Conference football champions
