= 2026–27 College Football Playoff =

Postseason college football tournament

- Season: 2026
- Dates: December 18, 2026 – January 25, 2027
- Venues: Campus sites TBD Neutral sites: Allegiant Stadium; AT&T Stadium; Caesars Superdome; Hard Rock Stadium; Mercedes-Benz Stadium; Rose Bowl; State Farm Stadium

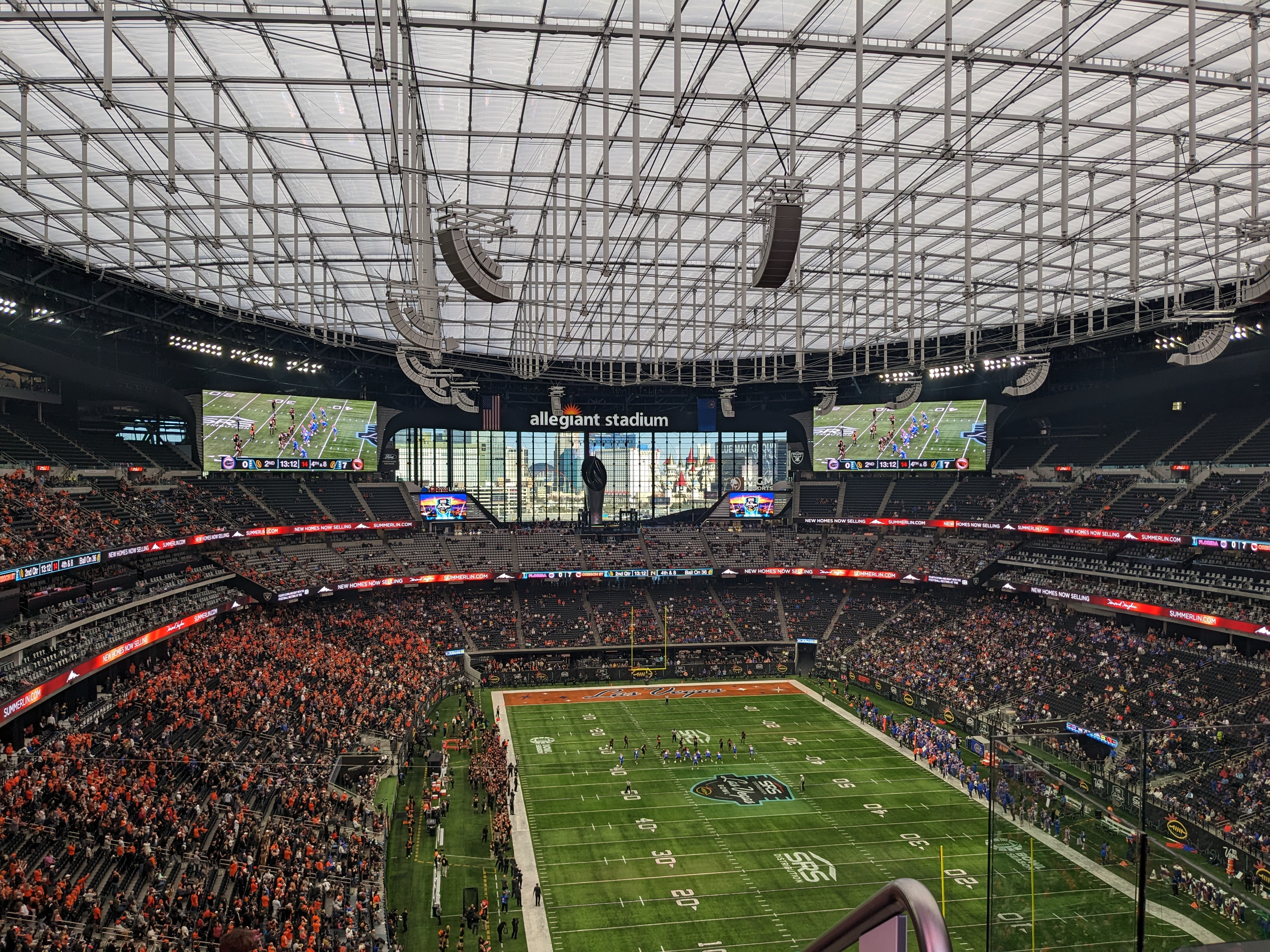
Allegiant Stadium in Las Vegas will host the College Football Playoff National Championship.

The 2026–27 College Football Playoff is a single-elimination postseason tournament that will determine the national champion of the 2026 NCAA Division I FBS football season. It will be the 13th edition of the College Football Playoff (CFP), the third to include 12 teams, and the last before an expansion to 24 teams beginning with the 2027–28 edition.

== Games ==
Game sites: First round (campus sites TBD), quarterfinals, semifinals, championship

The tournament is structured as a single-elimination bracket tournament, with 12 teams playing a total of 11 games. This will be the third edition of the CFP to include twelve teams and the 13th CFP since its founding. As in the previous edition, the champions of the Power Four conferences (P4) earn automatic bids. The Group of Six conferences (G6) maintained their guaranteed bid, though this season it will be given to the highest-ranked G6 team, regardless of conference-champion status. This edition of the tournament will be the only to be played under a memorandum of understanding between the CFP and Notre Dame following the latter's exclusion from the prior edition. Under the new MoU, Notre Dame is guaranteed a playoff spot if they are ranked anywhere within the top 12 of the final playoff rankings (i.e. they cannot be replaced by a lower-ranked G6 team).

The final CFP rankings and the resulting bracket pairings are scheduled to be released by the committee on December 6 at noon ET. The teams seeded Nos. 1–4 will receive first-round byes, and Nos. 5–8 will host first-round games against Nos. 9–12.

=== Schedule ===
All times are Eastern Time • Schedule source

Round	Date	Time	Matchup	Game	Location	TV
First round	December 18	8:00 p.m.		First round (Campus sites)		ESPN
First round	December 19	Noon		First round (Campus sites)		ABC/ESPN
First round	December 19	3:30 p.m.		First round (Campus sites)		TNT/TruTV/HBO Max
First round	December 19	7:30 p.m.		First round (Campus sites)		TNT/TruTV/HBO Max
Quarterfinals	December 30	7:30 p.m.		Fiesta Bowl	State Farm Stadium • Glendale, Arizona	TNT/TruTV/HBO Max
Quarterfinals	January 1	Noon		Time and TV assignments for January 1 games TBA: Cotton Bowl Classic — AT&T Stadium • Arlington, Texas; Peach Bowl — Mercedes-Benz Stadium • Atlanta, Georgia; Rose Bowl — Rose Bowl • Pasadena, California		TNT/TruTV/HBO Max
Quarterfinals	January 1	4:00 p.m.		Time and TV assignments for January 1 games TBA: Cotton Bowl Classic — AT&T Stadium • Arlington, Texas; Peach Bowl — Mercedes-Benz Stadium • Atlanta, Georgia; Rose Bowl — Rose Bowl • Pasadena, California		ABC/ESPN
Quarterfinals	January 1	8:00 p.m.		Time and TV assignments for January 1 games TBA: Cotton Bowl Classic — AT&T Stadium • Arlington, Texas; Peach Bowl — Mercedes-Benz Stadium • Atlanta, Georgia; Rose Bowl — Rose Bowl • Pasadena, California		ESPN
Semifinals	January 14	7:30 p.m.		Orange Bowl	Hard Rock Stadium • Miami Gardens, Florida	TNT/TruTV/HBO Max
Semifinals	January 15	7:30 p.m.		Sugar Bowl	Caesars Superdome • New Orleans, Louisiana	ABC/ESPN
Championship	January 25	7:30 p.m.		National Championship	Allegiant Stadium • Paradise, Nevada	ABC/ESPN

=== Bracket ===
First round (Dec 18–19); Campus sites
8
9
5
12
6
11
7
10

Quarterfinals (Dec 30–Jan 1); Fiesta/Rose/Cotton/Peach Bowls
1
4
3
2

Semifinals (Jan 14–15); Orange and Sugar Bowls

Championship
Jan 25 – Allegiant Stadium

Projected bracket based on Week 12 rankings

First round (Dec 18–19); Campus sites
Memorial Stadium
8	Indiana
9	Tennessee
Darrell K Royal–Texas Memorial Stadium
5	Texas
12	Boise State
Notre Dame Stadium
6	Notre Dame
11	Wake Forest
Hard Rock Stadium
7	Miami (FL)
10	BYU

Quarterfinals (Dec 30–Jan 1); Fiesta/Rose/Cotton/Peach Bowls
1	Georgia
4	UCLA
3	Alabama
2	Utah

Semifinals (Jan 14–15); Orange and Sugar Bowls

Championship
Jan 25 – Allegiant Stadium

== Selection and teams ==
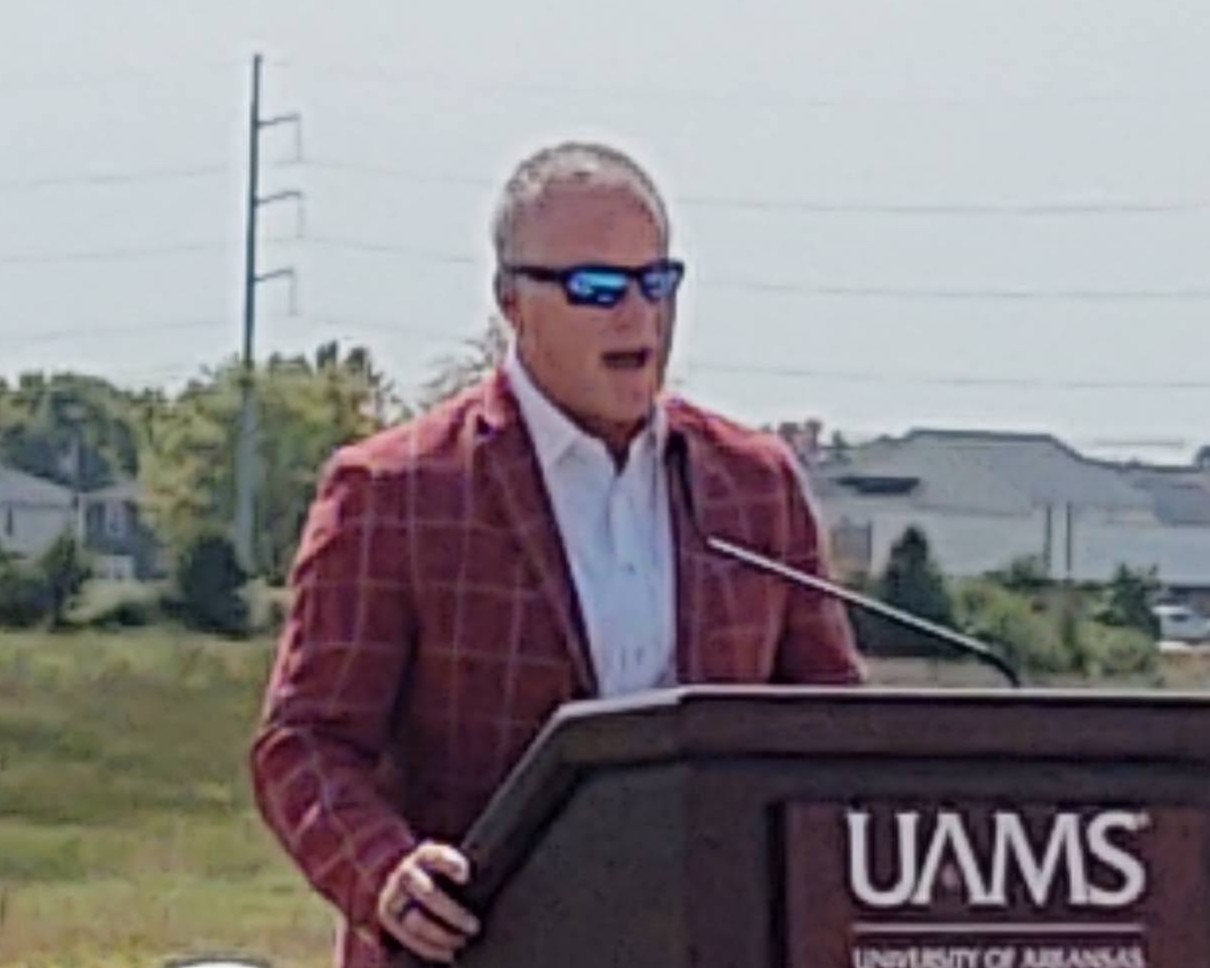
Hunter Yurachek (pictured in 2023) is the selection committee chair.

The 2026–27 CFP selection committee was chaired by Arkansas athletic director Hunter Yurachek. Its other members are Nebraska athletic director Troy Dannen, former Cincinnati and Michigan State head coach Mark Dantonio, Appalachian State athletic director Doug Gillin, Utah athletic director Mark Harlan, sportswriter Ivan Maisel, former Auburn and UCF head coach Gus Malzahn, Middle Tennessee athletic director Chris Massaro, former head coach Mike Riley, former Cal and Fresno State head coach Jeff Tedford, former NFL player Wesley Walls, and Virginia athletic director Carla Williams.

The CFP selection committee released their first top 25 rankings on November 3, 2026. Each of the P4 conferences were represented in the inaugural top four: No. 1 Miami (FL) from the Atlantic Coast Conference (ACC), No. 2 Georgia from the Southeastern Conference (SEC), No. 3 Utah from the Big 12 Conference, and the No. 4 Indiana from the Big Ten Conference. Four of the remaining six teams in the top ten were from the SEC—No. 5 Alabama, No. 6 Kentucky, No. 7 Texas, and No. 10 Ole Miss—along with No. 8 UCLA (Big Ten) and No. 9 BYU (Big 12). Notre Dame, an FBS independent, debuted at No. 11. The highest-ranked G6 team was No. 25 Boise State.

The first weekend of games following the initial rankings release saw five matchups between teams ranked in the top 15 of the CFP poll. No. 1 Miami suffered their first loss of the season at No. 11 Notre Dame in a game ESPN called a "classic"; it was Notre Dame's first win over a No. 1 team since 2020, and allowed the Irish to jump to No. 5 in the subsequent rankings while Miami fell to No. 7. No. 2 Georgia and No. 3 Utah each gained one spot after wins over No. 10 Ole Miss and No. 9 BYU, respectively, while No. 4 Indiana fell five spots to No. 9 despite being idle. Alabama rose from No. 5 to No. 3 following a road win over No. 14 LSU, the earliest a two-loss team had ever reached the top four of the CFP rankings. No. 13 Tennessee entered the prospective playoff field after defeating No. 6 Kentucky and jumping to No. 8; Texas Tech also moved into the top 12 after a win over West Virginia.

2026 College Football Playoff rankings top sixteen progression
No.	Week 10 November 3	Week 11 November 10	Week 12 November 17	Week 13 November 24	Week 14 December 1	Final December 6
1	**Miami (FL)** (8–0)	**Georgia** (8–1)	**Georgia** (9–1)			
2	**Georgia** (7–1)	**Utah** (9–0)	**Utah** (10–0)			
3	**Utah** (8–0)	Alabama (7–2)	Alabama (7–2)			
4	**Indiana** (8–1)	**UCLA** (9–0)	**UCLA** (10–0)			
5	Alabama (6–2)	Notre Dame (8–1)	Texas (8–2)			
6	Kentucky (7–1)	Texas (7–2)	Notre Dame (9–1)			
7	Texas (6–2)	**Miami (FL)** (8–1)	**Miami (FL)** (9–1)			
8	UCLA (8–0)	Tennessee (7–2)	Indiana (9–1)			
9	BYU (7–1)	Indiana (8–1)	Tennessee (8–2)			
10	Ole Miss (6–2)	BYU (7–2)	BYU (8–2)			
11	Notre Dame (7–1)	Kentucky (7–2)	Wake Forest (9–1)			
12	Ohio State (6–2)	Texas Tech (8–1)	Texas Tech (9–1)			
13	Tennessee (6–2)	Wake Forest (8–1)	Oregon (7–3)			
14	LSU (6–2)	Houston (7–2)	Ohio State (7–3)			
15	Texas Tech (7–1)	Iowa (7–2)	Iowa (8–2)			
16	Wake Forest (7–1)	Oregon (6–3)	Kentucky (7–3)			
G6	No. 25 **Boise State** (7–1)	No. 24 **Boise State** (8–1)	No. 17 **Boise State** (9–1)			

Key
Teams in **boldface** were leading their conference at time of rankings release (or conference winners in the case of the final rankings).
Guaranteed bids will be awarded to the Power Four conference champions and the highest-ranked Group of Six team.
The cutoff line represents the threshold of the top 12 teams as ranked by the CFP poll.
- A team ranked lower than 12 may still qualify, if it is one of the teams qualifying for a guaranteed bid.
- If that occurs, then that will displace the lowest-ranked at-large team (except Notre Dame, who is exempt from being displaced this way).
Teams listed as "G6" would be in position to qualify as the highest-ranked Group of Six team but were not in the top sixteen.
Denotes teams who rose in the rankings compared to the previous week.
Denotes teams who fell in the rankings compared to the previous week.
Denotes teams who were not ranked the previous week.
Denotes teams whose rankings or conference championship victory resulted in a berth for the College Football Playoff.
