= Braden Pegan =

American football player

No. 7 – Utah Utes
- Position: Wide receiver
- Class: Redshirt Senior

Personal information
- Listed height: 6 ft 3 in (1.91 m)
- Listed weight: 210 lb (95 kg)

Career information
- High school: San Juan Hills (San Juan Capistrano, California)
- College: UCLA (2022–2024); Utah State (2025); Utah (2026–present)
- Stats at ESPN

Braden Pegan is an American college football wide receiver for the Utah Utes. He previously played for the UCLA Bruins and Utah State Aggies.

== Early life ==
Pegan is from San Juan Capistrano, California. He attended San Juan Hills High School where he played football as a wide receiver and defensive back. He caught 24 passes for 426 yards and three touchdowns as a junior in 2020 and then had 72 catches for 971 yards and 14 touchdowns as a senior in 2021. Coming out of high school, Pegan was a three-star recruit. He committed to play college football for the UCLA Bruins.

== College career ==
Pegan played at UCLA for three seasons. He made four appearances in 2022, nine in 2023, and redshirted in 2024. He only caught one pass in his three years at UCLA. Pegan transferred to the Utah State Aggies in 2025 and became their top receiver, being named first-team All-Mountain West Conference (MW) after catching 60 passes for 926 yards and five touchdowns. Afterwards, he again entered the NCAA transfer portal and transferred to the Utah Utes. He joined his Utah State offensive coordinator Kevin McGiven at Utah.
