= Trey Reynolds =

American football player

No. 10 – Utah Utes
- Position: Linebacker
- Class: Senior

Personal information
- Listed height: 6 ft 1 in (1.85 m)
- Listed weight: 231 lb (105 kg)

Career information
- High school: Queen Creek (Queen Creek, Arizona)
- College: Utah (2021, 2024–present)
- Stats at ESPN

Trey Reynolds is an American college football linebacker for the Utah Utes.

== Early life ==
Reynolds grew up playing multiple sports with his younger brothers. He started playing football in the seventh grade.

Reynolds attended Queen Creek High School in Queen Creek, Arizona. He played both football and baseball. As a junior, Reynolds posted 159 tackles (including one tackle for loss), four forced fumbles, an interception, and a pass deflected. He also tallied 14 touchdowns (eight rushing, six passing) on offense. As a senior, Reynolds was named the Arizona Cardinals Defensive Player of the Year after leading the state with 157 tackles, including 67 solo tackles and two tackles for loss, to go with four passes defended, an interception, a fumble recovery, and 10 offensive touchdowns.

Reynolds was rated as a consensus three-star recruit. On May 22, 2020, he committed to playing college football for the Utah Utes over offers from schools such as Arizona, BYU, Michigan State, Oklahoma State, Oregon, Washington, Wisconsin, and UCLA.

== College career ==
As a freshman in 2021, Reynolds appeared in all 14 games and posted six tackles, all on special teams duty. He missed the next two seasons on a church mission before he returned to the team in 2024, recording 13 tackles in 12 games. Reynolds registered his first career interception in the 2025 season opener against UCLA, picking off Nico Iamaleava in a 43–10 win. He played in all 13 games, making four starts at linebacker, and finished the season with 28 tackles, six tackles for loss, 1.5 sacks, and two interceptions. Reynolds became a team captain and full-time starter in 2026.

== Personal life ==
Reynolds has two brothers and three sisters. His younger brother Porter played linebacker at Northern Arizona and UT Martin, while his youngest brother, Tait, plays quarterback at Clemson. Additionally, his sister Emma was the 2025-26 Gatorade Arizona Softball Player of the Year. Their father, Paul, played linebacker at Arizona State from 1996 to 1997. Reynolds is a member of The Church of Jesus Christ of Latter-day Saints and served his mission in Nashville, Tennessee.
