= Rabbit Evans =

American football player

No. 1 – Utah Utes
- Position: Safety
- Class: Redshirt Senior

Personal information
- Listed height: 6 ft 1 in (1.85 m)
- Listed weight: 205 lb (93 kg)

Career information
- High school: Jersey Village (Houston, Texas)
- College: Blinn (2022–2023); Utah (2024–present)
- Stats at ESPN

Rabbit Evans is an American football defensive back for the Utah Utes. He previously played for the Blinn Buccaneers.

== Early life ==
Evans attended Jersey Village High School in Houston, Texas. He committed to play college football for the Blinn Buccaneers.

== College career ==
In two seasons at Blinn from 2022 to 2023, Evans recorded 76 tackles, two pass deflections, a forced fumble, and a fumble recovery in 18 games, earning NCJCA first-team All-American honors in 2023. After the 2023 season, he entered the NCAA transfer portal.

Evans transferred to play for the Utah Utes. In week 7 of the 2024 season, he made his first start for the Utes, totaling nine tackles versus Arizona. Evans finished the 2024 season with 34 tackles with two for loss, and a pass deflection. In the 2025 season, he played in one game before suffering a season-ending leg injury. Evans returned in 2026 as a starter in the Utes secondary.
