= Kevin McGiven =

American football player and coach (born 1977)

Current position
- Title: Offensive coordinator
- Team: Utah
- Conference: Big 12

Biographical details
- Born: March 19, 1977 (age 49); Santa Clara, California, U.S.
- Education: Utah Valley University

Playing career
- 1995: Eastern Arizona College
- 1996–1997: Louisiana Tech
- Position: Wide receiver

Coaching career (HC unless noted)
- 1998: Louisiana Tech (SA)
- 2001: Mountain View HS (UT) (WR/TE)
- 2002–2004: BYU (GA)
- 2005: Southern Utah (OC/QB/WR)
- 2006–2008: Weber State (OC/QB)
- 2009: Utah State (AHC/QB)
- 2010–2011: Memphis (AHC/QB/RC)
- 2012: Montana State (OC/QB)
- 2013–2014: Utah State (OC/QB)
- 2015: Oregon State (QB)
- 2016: Oregon State (co-OC/QB)
- 2017: Oregon State (OC/QB)
- 2018–2020: San Jose State (OC)
- 2021–2023: San Jose State (OC/QB)
- 2024: San Jose State (WR/PGC)
- 2025: Utah State (OC/QB)
- 2026–present: Utah (OC)

Kevin Daniel McGiven (born March 19, 1977) is an American college football coach and former player who is the offensive coordinator at the University of Utah. He previously served as the offensive coordinator at Utah State University, San Jose State University, Oregon State University, Montana State University, Weber State University, and Southern Utah University.

== Early life and education ==
Born in Santa Clara, California, McGiven grew up in Orem, Utah and graduated from Mountain View High School in 1995.

McGiven played wide receiver at Eastern Arizona College in 1995 for head coach Paul Tidwell. He then transferred to Louisiana Tech and played from 1996 to 1997 for head coach Gary Crowton.

== Coaching career ==
=== Early coaching career ===
Following his playing career, McGiven was a student assistant for Louisiana Tech for the 1998 season.

McGiven took some time off before joining the coaching staff at his alma mater, Mountain View High School in Orem, Utah, in 2001, coaching the wide receivers and tight ends.

From 2002 to 2004, McGiven reunited with Crowton at BYU as an offensive graduate assistant.

=== Southern Utah ===
In 2005, McGiven served as the offensive coordinator at Southern Utah. He also coached the quarterbacks and wide receivers.

=== Weber State ===
From 2006 to 2008, McGiven was the offensive coordinator and quarterbacks coach on Ron McBride's staff at Weber State. His 2008 offense produced four All-Americans: Cameron Higgins, Tim Toone, Trevyn Smith, and Cody Nakamura.

=== Utah State ===
In 2009, McGiven joined the Utah State staff as the assistant head coach and quarterbacks coach. Utah State's offense improved from number 89 in the country to number 14.

=== Memphis ===
McGiven was the assistant head coach, quarterbacks coach, and recruiting coordinator for new head coach Larry Porter.

=== Montana State ===
In 2012, McGiven was the offensive coordinator and quarterbacks coach for the Montana State Bobcats football team. That year, Montana State reached the FCS quarterfinals. McGiven coached Big Sky Conference offensive MVP Denarius McGhee.

=== Return to Utah State ===
McGiven returned to Utah State for the 2013 and 2014 seasons as the offensive coordinator and quarterbacks coach. In 2014, he was named the Football Scoop Quarterback Coach of the Year.

=== Oregon State ===
In 2015, McGiven joined the Oregon State coaching staff as the quarterbacks coach. He took over the only quarterbacks room in the nation with no quarterback playing experience. In 2016, McGiven was promoted to co-offensive coordinator and was the primary play caller. OSU averaged 14 yards per game more rush and passing, both, from the previous year. The Beavers also scored 7.2 more points per game. In 2017, McGiven was the sole offensive coordinator.

=== San Jose State ===
In January 2018, McGiven joined former Oregon State assistant Brent Brennan's staff at San Jose State as their offensive coordinator.

After Ken Niumatalolo was hired as San Jose State's head coach in 2024, Craig Stutzmann was named offensive coordinator while McGiven was reassigned to wide receivers coach and passing game coordinator.

=== Utah State (third stint) ===
In 2025, McGiven was hired by Utah State University as their offensive coordinator and quarterbacks coach under head coach Bronco Mendenhall.

=== Utah ===
On January 3, 2026, McGiven was hired as the offensive coordinator at the University of Utah under head coach Morgan Scalley. He has seen recent success as the OC. Kevin has gone 8-0, with an innovative offense designed to have 2 Quarterbacks in the backfield at once. His offense has 38.88 points per game which is good for 14th in the country (as of week 8).

== Personal life ==
McGiven and his wife, Lindsay, have 3 sons, Peyton, K. J., Beau, and their daughter, Ireland. He earned his bachelor's degree in Business Management from Utah Valley University in 2001, and his Master's in physical education from BYU in 2005.
