= Sharrieff Shah =

American football coach (born 1971)

Current position
- Title: Special teams coordinator/cornerbacks coach
- Team: Utah Utes
- Conference: Big 12 Conference

Biographical details
- Born: January 29, 1971 (age 55); Los Angeles, California, U.S.
- Education: University of Utah (BS; MS; JD)

Playing career
- 1990–1993: Utah
- Position: Strong Safety

Coaching career (HC unless noted)
- 2012–2015: Utah (CB)
- 2016–2018: Utah (Co-STC/CB)
- 2019–present: Utah (STC/CB)

Sharrieff Shah Sr. (born January 29, 1971) is an American football coach, lawyer, and NFLPA-certified agent. A former football player, Shah is the special teams coordinator and cornerbacks coach at the University of Utah. He married Jennifer Lui (later known as Jen Shah) in 1994.

== Career ==
Shah earned All-WAC honors in his sophomore and junior seasons. He was named the Sports Illustrated National Defensive Player of the Week and WAC Player of the Week in Utah's 1991 win over Oregon State. Shah's performance against Oregon still ranks in the top five in Utah's single-game record book in four different categories: tackles for loss, forced fumbles, sacks and total lost yards (30).

He also ran indoor track for the Utes, competing in the 60-yard dash and long jump from 1990 to 1992. He qualified for the WAC Indoor Track and Field Championships all three years.

Following his playing days, Shah continued his education, eventually earning his Juris Doctor degree from Utah, before practicing law for twelve years in Utah. He started as a commercial litigator before transitioning to a trial lawyer specializing in medical malpractice and catastrophic automobile accidents. He was also a certified agent through the NFLPA, representing and training several NFL players. Shah served as the sideline reporter for Utah's flagship radio station and served as a sideline analyst for local television stations for three seasons.

In 2012, Shah returned to coaching when he was hired by Kyle Whittingham as the cornerbacks coach at Utah. Since then, he has continued coaching the corners while also serving as the co-special teams coordinator from 2016 through 2018, before being promoted to sole special teams coordinator prior to the 2019 season.

Shah has developed a reputation for being able to develop converted cornerbacks into highly successful players. Keith McGill (safety), Eric Rowe (safety), Brian Allen (wide receiver), Dominique Hatfield (wide receiver), and Josh Nurse (wide receiver – safety) are five examples of players that converted to cornerback at Utah, before stints in the NFL. Leading up to the Rose Bowl game on January 1, 2022, Shah was asked about converting players to cornerback for the game due to the large amount of injuries, but he said they were instead asking experienced players to do more.

In 2015, Shah was named Defensive Backs Coach of the Week by CoachingSearch.com twice, after wins against Michigan and California. He has also coached Jaylon Johnson and Julian Blackmon to All-American honors as defensive backs, and Kaelin Clay as a return specialist.

== Personal life ==
Shah married his wife, Jen Shah, known for The Real Housewives of Salt Lake City, in August 1994, after meeting in college. They have two children together: Sharrieff Jr. and Omar. He and his wife are Muslims. Jen Shah was jailed in February 2023 for 32 months. Sharrieff Jr. played cornerback for his father at Utah from 2013 to 2016.
