= Colton Swan (American football) =

American football coach (born 1980)

Current position
- Title: Defensive coordinator, linebackers coach
- Team: Utah
- Conference: Big 12

Biographical details
- Born: October 31, 1980 (age 45)
- Education: Weber State University (2003)

Playing career
- 1999–2003: Weber State
- Position: Linebacker

Coaching career (HC unless noted)
- 2004–2005: Weber State (GA)
- 2006–2008: Weber State (SAF)
- 2009–2011: Weber State (co-DC/LB)
- 2012–2013: Weber State (LB)
- 2014: Weber State (co-STC/TE)
- 2015–2016: Weber State (STC/TE)
- 2017–2018: Weber State (STC/LB)
- 2019–2025: Utah (LB)
- 2026–present: Utah (DC/LB)

Colton Swan (born October 31, 1980) is an American football coach who is currently the defensive coordinator and linebackers coach for the Utah Utes.

== Playing career ==
Swan played college football as a linebacker for the Weber State Wildcats from 1999 through 2003, where he was a key contributor, racking up 109 tackles in his senior, while earning second-team All-Big Sky Conference honors.

== Coaching career ==
Swan got his first coaching job in 2004 with his alma mater Weber State as a graduate assistant. Over the next 14-seasons, he would serve in multiple different roles, coaching safeties, linebackers, and tight ends, while also serving stints as the co-defensive coordinator and special teams coordinator until 2019. Before the start of the 2019 season, Swan joined Utah as the team's linebackers coach. Ahead of the 2026 season, he was promoted to serve as the Utes defensive coordinator.

== Personal life ==
Swan is a native of Jerome, Idaho.
