= Zereoue Williams =

American football player

No. 76 – Utah Utes
- Position: Offensive tackle
- Class: Senior

Personal information
- Listed height: 6 ft 8 in (2.03 m)
- Listed weight: 305 lb (138 kg)

Career information
- High school: Mountain Pointe (Ahwatukee, Phoenix)
- College: Utah (2021–present)
- Stats at ESPN

Zereoue Williams is an American college football offensive tackle for the Utah Utes.

== Early life ==
Williams stopped playing football in the seventh grade to primarily focus on basketball and did not return to football until his senior year at Mountain Pointe High School in Ahwatukee, Phoenix. In his lone season he was named all-city and all-region. He committed to the University of Utah to play college football.

== College career ==
Williams appeared in 37 games as a backup at Utah from 2021 to 2025. He missed the 2023 season due to injury. Williams took over as the starting left tackle in 2026.
