= Morgan Scalley =

American football player and coach (born 1979)

Current position
- Title: Head coach
- Team: Utah
- Conference: Big 12
- Record: 12–0

Biographical details
- Born: October 8, 1979 (age 47); Salt Lake City, Utah, U.S.

Playing career
- 2001–2004: Utah
- Position: Defensive back

Coaching career (HC unless noted)
- 2007: Utah (GA)
- 2008: Utah (S)
- 2009–2014: Utah (S/RC)
- 2015: Utah (ST/S/RC)
- 2016–2025: Utah (DC/S)
- 2025–present: Utah

Administrative career (AD unless noted)
- 2006: Utah (admin asst.)

Head coaching record
- Overall: 12–0

Accomplishments and honors

Awards
- Second-team All-American (2004); MW co-Defensive Player of the Year (2004); First-team All-MW (2004); Second-team All-MW (2003)

Morgan Scalley (born October 8, 1979) is an American college football coach who is the head football coach at the University of Utah, a position he has held since December 2025. He previously served as the defensive coordinator and safeties coach for the university from 2016 to 2025. Scalley played high school football at Highland High School in Salt Lake City and college football at Utah as a defensive back.

== Playing career ==
Scalley was a defensive back at Utah from 2001 to 2004. During his career there, he was named an All-American, Mountain West co-defensive player of the year, a unanimous first-team all-conference safety, as well as a second-team All-Mountain West Conference in 2003 and a 2× Academic All-American. Scalley was presented with the inaugural Pat Tillman award during the 2005 East-West Shrine Game.

== Coaching career ==
=== University of Utah ===
Scalley began working at Utah in 2006 as an administrative assistant before being named a graduate assistant in 2007. He was promoted to safeties coach in 2008, also assisting with special teams. He added the title of recruiting coordinator in 2009, and also added special teams duties in 2015.

Scalley was promoted to defensive coordinator in 2016 following the retirement of John Pease.

As the lead strategist of one of the nation's top defenses, Scalley was named a Broyles Award finalist in 2019, an award given to the top assistant coach in college football.

On July 1, 2024, Scalley was announced as Utah's head-coach-in-waiting. He previously held that designation until it was rescinded in 2020 following an investigation into his alleged use of improper racial stereotypes.

Scalley was officially named the new head coach of the team on December 13, 2025, a day after Kyle Whittingham announced he would step down. Scalley assumed his duties at the Las Vegas Bowl.

==== Suspension ====
Scalley admitted in June 2020 that he used a racial slur in a text to a recruit in 2013, and was promptly suspended by the university. An investigation revealed that there were also two additional incidents where Scalley was accused of using racial stereotypes. He was reinstated to his position as defensive coordinator after an external review by the university, but was reported to have taken a significant pay cut and the initial offer from the university to be its head-coach-in-waiting rescinded among other penalties.

== Personal life ==
Scalley is a member of the Church of Jesus Christ of Latter-day Saints, and served as a missionary for the church to Munich, Germany. He and his wife, Liz, have three children.

== Head coaching record ==
=== College ===
Year	Team	Overall	Conference	Standing	Bowl/playoffs	Coaches^{#}	AP^{°}
Utah Utes (Big 12 Conference) (2025–present)
2025	Utah	1–0	0–0		W Las Vegas	14	14
2026	Utah	11–0	8–0	1st			
Utah:		12–0					
Total:		12–0					
National championship Conference title Conference division title or championship game berth
