= 2026 Penn State Nittany Lions football team =

American college football season

2026 Penn State Nittany Lions football
- Conference: Big Ten Conference
- Record: 6–5 (3–5 Big Ten)
- Head coach: Matt Campbell (1st season)
- Offensive coordinator: Taylor Mouser (1st season)
- Offensive scheme: Pro spread
- Defensive coordinator: D'Anton Lynn (1st season)
- Base defense: 4–3
- Home stadium: Beaver Stadium

2026 Big Ten Conference football standings
	Conf.			Overall
Team	W		L	W		L
No. 4 UCLA	7	–	1	10	–	1
No. 8 Indiana	6	–	2	9	–	2
No. 15 Iowa	6	–	2	9	–	2
No. 13 Oregon	6	–	2	8	–	3
No. 18 USC	5	–	3	8	–	3
No. 14 Ohio State	5	–	3	7	–	4
Wisconsin	5	–	3	7	–	4
Nebraska	4	–	4	7	–	4
Washington	4	–	4	7	–	4
Illinois	4	–	4	6	–	5
Minnesota	4	–	4	6	–	5
Michigan	3	–	5	6	–	5
Northwestern	3	–	5	6	–	5
Penn State	3	–	5	6	–	5
Maryland	2	–	6	4	–	7
Purdue	2	–	6	3	–	8
Rutgers	2	–	6	3	–	8
Michigan State	1	–	7	3	–	8
Championship: December 5, 2026
^ – College Football Playoff participant; $ – Conference champion; y – Championship game participant; As of November 22, 2026; Rankings from CFP rankings

The 2026 Penn State Nittany Lions football team represents Pennsylvania State University in the Big Ten Conference during the 2026 NCAA Division I FBS football season. The Nittany Lions are led by head coach Matt Campbell, who is in his 1st year with the team. They play their home games at Beaver Stadium located in College Township, Pennsylvania with a University Park mailing address.

== Schedule ==
Date	Time	Opponent	Rank	Site	TV	Result	Attendance
September 5	3:30 p.m.	Marshall*	No. 18	Beaver Stadium; University Park, PA	FS1	W 45–0	108,489
September 12	12:00 p.m.	at Temple*	No. 16	Lincoln Financial Field; Philadelphia, PA	ESPN2	W 27–9	61,714
September 19	12:00 p.m.	Buffalo*	No. 14	Beaver Stadium; University Park, PA	BTN	W 55–13	103,817
September 26	5:00 p.m.	Wisconsin^{†}	No. 13	Beaver Stadium; University Park, PA	NBCSN/Peacock	L 20–24	108,014
October 2	8:00 p.m.	at Northwestern		Ryan Field; Evanston, IL	FOX	L 13–34	35,000
October 10	7:30 p.m.	No. 19 USC		Beaver Stadium; University Park, PA (White Out)	NBC	L 23–31	114,419
October 17	3:30 p.m.	at Michigan		Michigan Stadium; Ann Arbor, MI (rivalry)	CBS	L 18–21	110,731
October 31	4:15 p.m.	Purdue		Beaver Stadium; University Park, PA	BTN	W 31–17	102,041
November 7	3:30 p.m.	at Washington		Husky Stadium; Seattle, WA	FS1	W 28–25	67,879
November 14	7:00 p.m.	Minnesota		Beaver Stadium; University Park, PA (Governor's Victory Bell)	FS1	W 42–14	105,291
November 21	3:30 p.m.	Rutgers		Beaver Stadium; University Park, PA	FS1	L 24–25	106,200
November 28	3:30 p.m.	at Maryland		SECU Stadium; College Park, MD (rivalry)	FS1		
*Non-conference game; ^{†}Homecoming; Rankings from AP Poll (and CFP Rankings, after November 3) – Released prior to game; All times are in Eastern time; Source:

== Rankings ==
Ranking movements Legend: ██ Increase in ranking ██ Decrease in ranking — = Not ranked RV = Received votes
	Week																
Poll	Pre	1	2	3	4	5	6	7	8	9	10	11	12	13	14	15	Final
AP	18	16	14	13	RV	—	—	—	—	—	—	—	—				
Coaches	17	16	15	14	22	—	—	—	—	—	—	—	—				
CFP	Not released									—	—	—					Not released

== Game summaries ==
=== vs Marshall ===
Marshall Thundering Herd (0–0) at No. 18 Penn State Nittany Lions (0–0) – Game summary

Quarter	1	2	3	4	Total
Thundering Herd	0	0	0	0	0
No. 18 Nittany Lions	17	7	14	7	45

at Beaver Stadium • University Park, Pennsylvania

- Date: September 5
- Game time: 3:30 p.m. EDT
- Game weather: 76 °F (24 °C) • partly sunny
- Game attendance: 108,489
- Referee: Mark Kluczynski
- TV announcers (FS1): Jack Kizer (play-by-play) and Mark Helfrich (analyst)
- ESPN box score, GoPSUsports.com box score

Game information

First quarter

- (12:26) PSU – Ryan Barker 38-yard field goal (Drive: 6 plays, 30 yards, 2:27; Penn State 3–0)
- (8:35) PSU – Koby Howard 42-yard pass from Rocco Becht, Ryan Barker kick (Drive: 4 plays, 62 yards, 2:00; Penn State 10–0)
- (4:49) PSU – Brett Eskildsen 25-yard pass from Rocco Becht, Ryan Barker kick (Drive: 6 plays, 66 yards, 2:27; Penn State 17–0)

Second quarter

- (1:18) PSU – Benjamin Brahmer 8-yard pass from Rocco Becht, Ryan Barker kick (Drive: 11 plays, 87 yards, 5:09; Penn State 24–0)

Third quarter

- (11:14) PSU – Zay Robinson 39-yard pass from Rocco Becht, Ryan Barker kick (Drive: 4 plays, 74 yards, 1:52; Penn State 31–0)
- (6:16) PSU – Quinton Martin Jr. 6-yard run, Ryan Barker kick (Drive: 6 plays, 54 yards, 2:39; Penn State 38–0)

Fourth quarter

- (7:59) PSU – Cam Wallace 6-yard run, Ryan Barker kick (Drive: 6 plays, 30 yards, 3:18; Penn State 45–0)

Statistics	MRSH	PSU
First downs	11	25
Plays–yards	54–147	72–487
Rushes–yards	26–44	45–163
Passing yards	103	324
Passing: comp–att–int	19–28–1	20–27–0
Turnovers	2	0
Time of possession	23:47	36:13

Team	Category	Player	Statistics
Marshall	Passing	Carlos Del Rio-Wilson	17/25, 102 yards
Marshall	Rushing	Carlos Del Rio-Wilson	13 carries, 30 yards
Marshall	Receiving	Toby Payne	8 receptions, 55 yards
Penn State	Passing	Rocco Becht	13/18, 271 yards, 4 TD
Penn State	Rushing	Carson Hansen	11 carries, 48 yards
Penn State	Receiving	Koby Howard	6 receptions, 161 yards, TD

=== at Temple ===
No. 16 Penn State Nittany Lions (1–0) at Temple Owls (1–0) – Game summary

Quarter	1	2	3	4	Total
No. 16 Nittany Lions	0	10	10	7	27
Owls	0	3	0	6	9

at Lincoln Financial Field • Philadelphia, Pennsylvania

- Date: September 12
- Game time: 12:00 p.m. EDT
- Game weather: 77 °F (25 °C) • mostly cloudy
- Game attendance: 61,714
- Referee: Bryan Banks
- TV announcers (ESPN2): Anish Shroff (play-by-play), Andre Ware (analyst), and Morgan Uber (sideline)
- ESPN box score, GoPSUsports.com box score

Game information

First quarter

- No scoring plays.

Second quarter

- TEM – Carl Hardin 24-yard field goal, 12:00. Owls 3–0. Drive: 15 plays, 91 yards, 8:11.
- PSU – Ryan Barker 31-yard field goal, 6:51. Tied 3–3. Drive: 10 plays, 62 yards, 5:09.
- PSU – Benjamin Brahmer 23-yard pass from Rocco Becht (Ryan Barker kick), 0:08. Nittany Lions 10–3. Drive: 10 plays, 83 yards, 1:49.

Third quarter

- PSU – Chase Sowell 16-yard pass from Rocco Becht (Ryan Barker kick), 8:25. Nittany Lions 17–3. Drive: 8 plays, 66 yards, 3:21.
- PSU – Ryan Barker 39-yard field goal, 0:08. Nittany Lions 20–3. Drive: 11 plays, 62 yards, 6:08.

Fourth quarter

- PSU – Benjamin Brahmer 23-yard pass from Rocco Becht (Ryan Barker kick), 7:48. Nittany Lions 27–3. Drive: 10 plays, 85 yards, 5:02.
- TEM – Ajani Sheppard 3-yard run (run failed), 1:56. Nittany Lions 27–9. Drive: 12 plays, 75 yards, 7:48.

Statistics	PSU	TEM
First downs	23	14
Plays–yards	61–416	55–283
Rushes–yards	34–148	33–176
Passing yards	268	107
Passing: comp–att–int	21–27–0	13–22–1
Turnovers	0	1
Time of possession	28:49	31:11

Team	Category	Player	Statistics
Penn State	Passing	Rocco Becht	21/27, 268 yards, 3 TD
Penn State	Rushing	Carson Hansen	19 carries, 84 yards
Penn State	Receiving	Benjamin Brahmer	5 receptions, 79 yards, 2 TD
Temple	Passing	Jaxon Smolik	10/16, 59 yards, INT
Temple	Rushing	Keveun Mason	14 carries, 76 yards
Temple	Receiving	Jayce Freeman	1 reception, 39 yards

=== vs Buffalo ===
Buffalo Bulls (1–1) at No. 14 Penn State Nittany Lions (2–0) – Game summary

Quarter	1	2	3	4	Total
Bulls	3	3	0	7	13
No. 14 Nittany Lions	17	17	14	7	55

at Beaver Stadium • University Park, Pennsylvania

- Date: September 19
- Game time: 12:00 p.m. EDT
- Game weather: 63 °F (17 °C) • mostly cloudy
- Game attendance: 103,817
- Referee: Kole Knueppel
- TV announcers (BTN): Chris Vosters (play-by-play), Matt Millen (analyst), and Caroline Hendershot (sideline)
- ESPN box score, GoPSUsports.com box score

Game information

First quarter

- PSU – Ryan Barker, 48-yard field goal, 11:53 (3–0 PSU)
- PSU – James Peoples, 16-yard TD run, Barker kick, 8:00 (10–0 PSU)
- PSU – Andrew Rappleyea, 3-yard TD pass from Rocco Becht, Barker kick, 6:19 (17–0 PSU)
- UB – Oliver Hautanen, 21-yard field goal, 1:39 (17–3 PSU)

Second quarter

- PSU – Ryan Barker, 25-yard field goal, 14:14 (20–3 PSU)
- PSU – Koby Howard, 20-yard TD run, Barker kick, 10:47 (27–3 PSU)
- PSU – Howard, 70-yard TD pass from Becht, Barker kick, 2:31 (34–3 PSU)
- UB – Hautanen, 38-yard field goal, 0:00 (34–6 PSU)

Third quarter

- PSU – Carson Hansen, 12-yard TD run, Barker kick, 11:29 (41–6 PSU)
- PSU – Peoples, 11-yard TD run, Barker kick, 8:14 (48–6 PSU)

Fourth quarter

- PSU – Cam Wallace, 59-yard TD run, Matthew Parker kick, 12:31 (55–6 PSU)
- UB – James McNeil Jr., 1-yard TD run, Hautanen kick, 5:01 (55–13 PSU)

Statistics	BUFF	PSU
First downs	13	25
Plays–yards	63–173	67–573
Rushes–yards	38–113	41–304
Passing yards	60	269
Passing: comp–att–int	10–25–0	15–26–0
Turnovers	2	0
Time of possession	28:37	31:23

Team	Category	Player	Statistics
Buffalo	Passing	Jason Wright	10/25, 60 yards
Buffalo	Rushing	James McNeil Jr.	20 carries, 80 yards, TD
Buffalo	Receiving	Chance Morrow	2 receptions, 31 yards
Penn State	Passing	Rocco Becht	11/19, 212 yards, 2 TD
Penn State	Rushing	Quinton Martin Jr.	10 carries, 100 yards
Penn State	Receiving	Koby Howard	3 receptions, 115 yards, TD

=== vs Wisconsin ===
Wisconsin Badgers (2–1) at No. 13 Penn State Nittany Lions (3–0) – Game summary

Quarter	1	2	3	4	Total
Badgers	0	7	3	14	24
No. 13 Nittany Lions	3	14	3	0	20

at Beaver Stadium • University Park, Pennsylvania

- Date: September 26
- Game time: 5:00 p.m. EDT
- Game weather: 67 °F (19 °C) • overcast, showers, windy
- Game attendance: 108,014
- Referee: Tim O'Dey
- TV announcers (NBCSN/Peacock): Dave Flemming (play-by-play), Matt Cassel (analyst), and Ashley ShahAhmadi (sideline)
- ESPN box score, GoPSUsports.com box score

Game information

First quarter

- PSU – Ryan Barker, 22-yard field goal, 6:16 (3–0 PSU)

Second quarter

- PSU – Josiah Zayas, 51-yard interception return for TD, Barker kick, 12:50 (10–0 PSU)
- PSU – Rocco Becht, 3-yard TD run, Barker kick, 10:29 (17–0 PSU)
- UW – Colton Joseph, 7-yard TD run, Gavin Lahm kick, 1:18 (17–7 PSU)

Third quarter

- UW – Lahm, 34-yard field goal, 10:53 (17–10 PSU)
- PSU – Barker, 37-yard field goal, 3:53 (20–10 PSU)

Fourth quarter

- UW – Eugene Hilton Jr., 11-yard TD pass from Joseph, Lahm kick, 3:31 (20–17 PSU)
- UW – Jacob Harris, 72-yard TD pass from Joseph, Lahm kick, 1:13 (24–20 UW)

Statistics	WIS	PSU
First downs	18	12
Plays–yards	66–355	65–233
Rushes–yards	28–120	36–119
Passing yards	235	114
Passing: comp–att–int	18–38–3	12–29–1
Turnovers	3	1
Time of possession	29:34	30:26

Team	Category	Player	Statistics
Wisconsin	Passing	Colton Joseph	18/38, 235 yards, 2 TD, 3 INT
Wisconsin	Rushing	Darrion Dupree	8 carries, 52 yards
Wisconsin	Receiving	Jacob Harris	5 receptions, 105 yards, TD
Penn State	Passing	Rocco Becht	12/29, 114 yards, INT
Penn State	Rushing	James Peoples	14 carries, 67 yards
Penn State	Receiving	Chase Sowell	6 receptions, 70 yards

=== at Northwestern ===
Penn State Nittany Lions (3–1) at Northwestern Wildcats (2–1) – Game summary

Quarter	1	2	3	4	Total
Nittany Lions	0	7	0	6	13
Wildcats	10	14	7	3	34

at Ryan Field • Evanston, Illinois

- Date: October 2
- Game time: 8:00 p.m. EDT
- Game weather: 57 °F (14 °C) • clear
- Game attendance: 35,000
- Referee: Gregory Blum
- TV announcers (FOX): Connor Onion (play-by-play), Robert Griffin III (analyst), and Alexa Landestoy (sideline)
- ESPN box score, GoPSUsports.com box score

Game information

First quarter

- NU – Jackson Kleather, 50-yard field goal, 10:09 (3–0 NU)
- NU – Aidan Chiles, 2-yard TD run, Kleather kick, 5:07 (10–0 NU)

Second quarter

- PSU – Carson Hansen, 8-yard TD run, Ryan Barker kick, 10:39 (10–7 NU)
- NU – Joseph Himon II, 35-yard TD run, Kleather kick, 9:21 (17–7 NU)
- NU – Himon, 11-yard TD run, Kleather kick, 1:55 (24–7 NU)

Third quarter

- NU – Caleb Komolafe, 1-yard TD rush, Kleather kick, 1:13 (31–7 NU)

Fourth quarter

- PSU – Chase Sowell, 16-yard TD pass from Rocco Becht, 2-point conversion pass incomplete, 7:53 (31–13 NU)
- NU – Kleather, 37-yard field goal, 2:17 (34–13 NU)

Statistics	PSU	NU
First downs	20	25
Plays–yards	63–291	69–506
Rushes–yards	22–48	55–413
Passing yards	243	93
Passing: comp–att–int	26–41–2	10–14–0
Turnovers	2	1
Time of possession	23:55	36:05

Team	Category	Player	Statistics
Penn State	Passing	Rocco Becht	26/41, 243 yards, TD, 2 INT
Penn State	Rushing	Carson Hansen	4 carries, 19 yards, TD
Penn State	Receiving	Chase Sowell	5 receptions, 68 yards, TD
Northwestern	Passing	Aidan Chiles	10/14, 93 yards
Northwestern	Rushing	Caleb Komolafe	25 carries, 188 yards, TD
Northwestern	Receiving	Griffin Wilde	2 receptions, 36 yards

=== vs No. 19 USC ===
No. 19 USC Trojans (5–1) at Penn State Nittany Lions (3–2) – Game summary

Quarter	1	2	3	4	Total
No. 19 Trojans	7	10	7	7	31
Nittany Lions	7	10	3	3	23

at Beaver Stadium • University Park, Pennsylvania

- Date: October 10
- Game time: 7:30 p.m. EDT
- Game weather: 61 °F (16 °C) • mostly cloudy
- Game attendance: 114,419
- Referee: Jeffrey Servinski
- TV announcers (NBC): Noah Eagle (play-by-play), Todd Blackledge (analyst), and Kathryn Tappen (sideline)
- ESPN box score, GoPSUsports.com box score

Game information

First quarter

- USC – Trent Mosley, 19-yard TD pass from Jayden Maiava, Caden Chittenden kick, 10:37 (7–0 USC)
- PSU – Andrew Rappleyea, 13-yard TD pass from Rocco Becht, Ryan Barker kick, 7:26 (7–7 TIE)

Second quarter

- USC – Tanook Hines, 11-yard TD pass from Maiava, Chittenden kick, 13:36 (14–7 USC)
- PSU – Carson Hansen, 3-yard TD run, Barker kick, 9:59 (14–14 TIE)
- USC – Chittenden, 37-yard field goal, 2:11 (17–14 USC)
- PSU – Barker, 48-yard field goal, 0:00 (17–17 TIE)

Third quarter

- PSU – Barker, 35-yard field goal, 11:23 (20–17 PSU)
- USC – King Miller, 13-yard TD run, Chittenden kick, 5:38 (24–20 USC)

Fourth quarter

- PSU – Barker, 26-yard field goal, 14:52 (24–23 USC)
- USC – Kayden Dixon-Wyatt, 10-yard TD pass from Maiava, Chittenden kick, 11:11 (31–23 USC)

Statistics	USC	PSU
First downs	25	18
Plays–yards	63–430	63–357
Rushes–yards	30–129	31–68
Passing yards	301	289
Passing: comp–att–int	21–33–0	21–32–0
Turnovers	0	1
Time of possession	30:08	29:52

Team	Category	Player	Statistics
USC	Passing	Jayden Maiava	21/33, 301 yards, 3 TD
USC	Rushing	King Miller	19 carries, 102 yards, TD
USC	Receiving	Trent Mosley	9 receptions, 111 yards, TD
Penn State	Passing	Rocco Becht	21/32, 289 yards, TD
Penn State	Rushing	Carson Hansen	14 carries, 28 yards, TD
Penn State	Receiving	Chase Sowell	4 receptions, 95 yards

=== at Michigan ===
Penn State Nittany Lions (3–3) at Michigan Wolverines (3–2) – Game summary

Quarter	1	2	3	4	Total
Nittany Lions	3	0	0	15	18
Wolverines	0	0	14	7	21

at Michigan Stadium • Ann Arbor, Michigan

- Date: October 17
- Game time: 3:30 p.m. EDT
- Game weather: 53 °F (12 °C) • sunny, clear
- Game attendance: 110,731
- Referee: Tim O'Dey
- TV announcers (CBS): Brad Nessler (play-by-play), Charles Davis (analyst), and Jenny Dell (sideline)
- ESPN box score, GoPSUsports.com box score

Game information

First quarter

- PSU – Ryan Barker, 24-yard field goal, 5:58 (3–0 PSU)

Second quarter

No scoring

Third quarter

- UM – Bryson Kuzdzal, 43-yard TD run, Trey Butkowski kick, 11:58 (7–3 UM)
- UM – Jordan Marshall, 1-yard TD run, Butkowski kick, 2:14 (14–3 UM)

Fourth quarter

- PSU – Carson Hansen, 2-yard TD run, Benjamin Brahmer 2-point conversion pass reception from Rocco Becht, 11:40 (14–11 UM)
- UM – Tommy Carr, 12-yard TD run, Butkowski kick, 2:58 (21–11 UM)
- PSU – Chase Sowell, 24-yard TD pass from Becht, Barker kick, 1:11 (21–18 UM)

Statistics	PSU	MICH
First downs	22	15
Plays–yards	74–332	53–301
Rushes–yards	30–65	35–211
Passing yards	267	90
Passing: comp–att–int	28–44–2	10–18–2
Turnovers	3	2
Time of possession	32:02	27:58

Team	Category	Player	Statistics
Penn State	Passing	Rocco Becht	28/44, 267 yards, TD, 2 INT
Penn State	Rushing	Carson Hansen	15 carries, 51 yards, TD
Penn State	Receiving	Chase Sowell	11 receptions, 151 yards, TD
Michigan	Passing	Tommy Carr	5/7, 47 yards, TD
Michigan	Rushing	Savion Hiter	11 carries, 78 yards
Michigan	Receiving	JJ Buchanan	3 receptions, 36 yards

=== vs Purdue ===
Purdue Boilermakers (3–4) at Penn State Nittany Lions (3–4) – Game summary

Quarter	1	2	3	4	Total
Boilermakers	7	7	0	3	17
Nittany Lions	14	7	3	7	31

at Beaver Stadium • University Park, Pennsylvania

- Date: October 31
- Game time: 4:15 p.m. EDT
- Game weather: 61 °F (16 °C) • sunny, clear
- Game attendance: 102,041
- Referee: Chris Coyte
- TV announcers (BTN): Chris Vosters (play-by-play), Anthony Herron (analyst), and Dannie Rogers (sideline)
- ESPN box score, GoPSUsports.com box score

Game information

First quarter

- PSU – Andrew Rappleyea, 4-yard TD pass from Rocco Becht, Ryan Barker kick, 5:13 (7–0 PSU)
- PU – Xavier Townsend, 33-yard TD pass from Ryan Browne, Jacobo Echeverria Lozano kick, 3:09 (7–7 TIE)
- PSU – Becht, 6-yard TD run, Barker kick, 0:50 (14–7 PSU)

Second quarter

- PU – Jalil Hall, 31-yard blocked punt return for TD, Echeverria Lozano kick, 8:52 (14–14 TIE)
- PSU – Carson Hansen, 1-yard TD run, Barker kick, 1:48 (21–14 PSU)

Third quarter

- PSU – Barker, 44-yard field goal, 2:11 (24–14 PSU)

Fourth quarter

- PSU – Cam Wallace, 2-yard TD run, Barker kick, 9:23 (31–14 PSU)
- PU – Echeverria Lozano, 49-yard field goal, 6:08 (31–17 PSU)

Statistics	PUR	PSU
First downs	9	22
Plays–yards	44–175	76–457
Rushes–yards	15–33	51–269
Passing yards	142	188
Passing: comp–att–int	10–29–2	17–25–0
Turnovers	2	0
Time of possession	16:33	43:27

Team	Category	Player	Statistics
Purdue	Passing	Ryan Browne	10/29, 142 yards, TD, 2 INT
Purdue	Rushing	Fame Ijeboi	11 carries, 20 yards
Purdue	Receiving	Asaad Waseem	3 receptions, 64 yards
Penn State	Passing	Rocco Becht	16/24, 175 yards, TD
Penn State	Rushing	Cam Wallace	22 carries, 135 yards, TD
Penn State	Receiving	Benjamin Brahmer	4 receptions, 58 yards

=== at Washington ===
Penn State Nittany Lions (4–4) at Washington Huskies (5–3) – Game summary

Quarter	1	2	3	4	Total
Nittany Lions	7	21	0	0	28
Huskies	3	3	11	8	25

at Husky Stadium • Seattle, Washington

- Date: November 7
- Game time: 3:30 p.m. EST
- Game weather: 54 °F (12 °C) • cloudy
- Game attendance: 67,879
- Referee: Gregory Blum
- TV announcers (FS1): Dan Hellie (play-by-play) and Robert Smith (analyst)
- ESPN box score, GoPSUsports.com box score

Game information

First quarter

- UW – Tyler Robles, 29-yard field goal, 8:13 (3–0 UW)
- PSU – Carson Hansen, 12-yard TD run, Ryan Barker kick, 4:35 (7–3 PSU)

Second quarter

- PSU – Zay Robinson, 24-yard TD pass from Rocco Becht, Barker kick, 14:43 (14–3 PSU)
- PSU – Chase Sowell, 45-yard TD pass from Becht, Barker kick, 10:03 (21–3 PSU)
- UW – Robles, 31-yard field goal, 5:10 (21–6 PSU)
- PSU – Cam Wallace, 46-yard TD run, Barker kick, 2:44 (28–6 PSU)

Third quarter

- UW – Robles, 47-yard field goal, 10:27 (28–9 PSU)
- UW – Baron Naone, 4-yard TD pass from Demond Williams Jr., D. Williams Jr. pass to Rashid Williams for 2-point conversion, 3:55 (28–17 PSU)

Fourth quarter

- UW – Dezmen Roebuck, 6-yard TD pass from D. Williams Jr., Naone 2-point conversion pass reception from D. Williams Jr., 7:40 (28–25 PSU)

Statistics	PSU	WASH
First downs	21	15
Plays–yards	64–414	58–306
Rushes–yards	37–174	25–134
Passing yards	240	172
Passing: comp–att–int	16–27–0	19–33–1
Turnovers	0	1
Time of possession	31:14	28:46

Team	Category	Player	Statistics
Penn State	Passing	Rocco Becht	16/27, 240 yards, 2 TD
Penn State	Rushing	Carson Hansen	14 carries, 119 yards, TD
Penn State	Receiving	Chase Sowell	4 receptions, 125 yards, TD
Washington	Passing	Demond Williams Jr.	19/33, 172 yards, 2 TD, INT
Washington	Rushing	Jayden Limar	9 carries, 66 yards
Washington	Receiving	Chris Lawson	5 receptions, 89 yards

=== vs Minnesota ===
Minnesota Golden Gophers (5–4) at Penn State Nittany Lions (5–4) – Game summary

Quarter	1	2	3	4	Total
Golden Gophers	0	0	14	0	14
Nittany Lions	14	14	7	7	42

at Beaver Stadium • University Park, Pennsylvania

- Date: November 14
- Game time: 7:00 p.m. EST
- Game weather: 39 °F (4 °C) • snow showers, windy
- Game attendance: 105,291
- Referee: Francisco Villar
- TV announcers (FS1): Dan Hellie (play-by-play) and Robert Smith (analyst)
- ESPN boxscore, GoPSUsports.com boxscore

Game information

First quarter

- PSU – Rocco Becht, 1-yard TD run, Ryan Barker kick, 8:44 (7–0 PSU)
- PSU – Benjamin Brahmer, 19-yard TD pass from Becht, Barker kick, 5:15 (14–0 PSU)

Second quarter

- PSU – Carson Hansen, 46-yards TD run, Barker kick, 10:10 (21–0 PSU)
- PSU – Cam Wallace, 1-yard TD pass from Becht, Barker kick, 0:33 (28–0 PSU)

Third quarter

- PSU – Brahmer, 4-yard TD pass from Becht, Barker kick, 8:33 (35–0 PSU)
- UM – Javon Tracy, 10-yard TD pass from Drake Lindsey, Luke Drzewiecki kick, 6:14 (35–7 PSU)
- UM – Tracy, 15-yard TD pass from Lindsey, Drzewiecki kick, 1:40 (35–14 PSU)

Fourth quarter

- PSU –James Peoples, 22-yard TD pass from Alex Manske, Barker kick 2:51 (42–14 PSU)

Statistics	MINN	PSU
First downs	14	16
Plays–yards	57–226	58–351
Rushes–yards	27–41	41–229
Passing yards	185	122
Passing: comp–att–int	16–30–0	11–17–0
Turnovers	1	0
Time of possession	27:30	32:30

Team	Category	Player	Statistics
Minnesota	Passing	Drake Lindsey	16/30, 185 yards, 2 TD
Minnesota	Rushing	Darius Taylor	13 carries, 32 yards
Minnesota	Receiving	Darius Taylor	4 receptions, 85 yards
Penn State	Passing	Rocco Becht	9/15, 84 yards, 3 TD
Penn State	Rushing	Carson Hansen	12 carries, 126 yards, TD
Penn State	Receiving	Andrew Rappleyea	4 receptions, 45 yards

=== vs Rutgers ===
Rutgers Scarlet Knights (2–8) at Penn State Nittany Lions (6–4) – Game summary

Quarter	1	2	3	4	Total
Scarlet Knights	0	10	0	15	25
Nittany Lions	9	7	8	0	24

at Beaver Stadium • University Park, Pennsylvania

- Date: November 21
- Game time: 3:30 p.m. EST
- Game weather: 61 °F (16 °C) • partly sunny
- Game attendance: 106,200
- Referee: Bryan Banks
- TV announcers (FS1): Noah Reed (play-by-play) and Petros Papadakis (analyst)
- ESPN box score, GoPSUsports.com box score

Game information

First quarter

- PSU – Cam Wallace, 56-yard TD run, Ryan Barker kick, 10:22 (7–0 PSU)
- PSU – Safety, Clay Thevenin tackled in end zone, 0:00 (9–0 PSU)

Second quarter

- PSU – Chase Sowell, 17-yard TD pass from Rocco Becht, Barker kick, 5:14 (16–0 PSU)
- RU – Antwan Raymond, 5-yard TD run, Jack Scullion kick, 1:55 (16–7 PSU)
- RU – Scullion, 20-yard field goal, 0:15 (16–10 PSU)

Third quarter

- PSU – Becht, 6-yard TD run, Benjamin Brahmer 2-point conversion pass reception from Becht, 4:57 (24–10 PSU)

Fourth quarter

- RU – Raymond, 13-yard TD run, Scullion kick, 10:19 (24–17 PSU)
- RU – Ben Black, 3-yard TD run, AJ Surace 2-yard pass to Raymond, lateral to Black, Thevenin 2-point conversion pass reception from Surace, 0:00 (25–24 RU)

Statistics	RUTG	PSU
First downs	20	15
Plays–yards	72–263	56–387
Rushes–yards	33–85	35–154
Passing yards	178	233
Passing: comp–att–int	24–39–0	14–21–0
Turnovers	0	2
Time of possession	30:22	29:38

Team	Category	Player	Statistics
Rutgers	Passing	AJ Surace	24/39, 178 yards, TD
Rutgers	Rushing	Antwan Raymond	23 carries, 101 yards, 2 TD
Rutgers	Receiving	Logan Blake	5 receptions, 40 yards
Penn State	Passing	Rocco Becht	14/21, 233 yards, TD
Penn State	Rushing	Cam Wallace	16 carries, 95 yards, TD
Penn State	Receiving	Chase Sowell	6 receptions, 123 yards, TD

=== at Maryland ===
Penn State Nittany Lions (6–5) at Maryland Terrapins (4–7) – Game summary

Quarter	1	2	3	4	Total
Nittany Lions	-	-	-	-	0
Terrapins	-	-	-	-	0

at SECU Stadium • College Park, Maryland

- Date: November 28
- Game time: 3:30 p.m. EST
- TV: FS1

== Personnel ==
=== Roster ===
2026 Penn State Nittany Lions football team roster
Players
Coaches
Offense

Pos.	#	Name	Class
WR	0	Chase Sowell	Sr
RB	1	James Peoples	Jr
WR	2	Zay Robinson	Fr
QB	3	Rocco Becht	Sr
WR	4	Brett Eskildsen	Jr
WR	6	Koby Howard	So
QB	7	Alex Manske	Fr
WR	8	Karon Brookings	Fr
WR	11	Lyrick Samuel	Fr
QB	12	Kase Evans	Fr
WR	13	Hank Lustig	Fr
QB	14	Peyton Falzone	Fr
WR	15	Keith Jones Jr.	So
QB	17	Connor Barry	Sr
TE	18	Benjamin Brahmer	Sr
QB	19	Jack Lambert	Jr
WR	19	Amarion Jackson	Fr
RB	21	Carson Hansen	Sr
RB	25	Quinton Martin Jr.	So
RB	26	Cam Wallace	So
RB	29	D'Antae Sheffey	Fr
WR	31	Logan Cunningham	Sr
RB	36	Amar'e Glover	Fr
RB	37	Jeremy Washington	Fr
OL	50	Cooper Cousins	Jr
OL	51	Brock Riker	So
OL	52	Dominic Rulli	Sr
OL	54	Vaea Ikakoula	Fr
OL	55	Chimdy Onoh	Jr
OL	56	Mason Bandhauer	Fr
OL	61	Liam Horan	So
OL	65	Jim Fitzgerald	Sr
OL	66	Will Tompkins	Fr
OL	67	Henry Boehme	Jr
OL	68	Anthony Donkoh	Jr
OL	70	Trevor Buhr	Jr
OL	71	Garrett Sexton	So
OL	72	Tyshon Huff	Jr
OL	74	Kuol Kuol II	Fr
OL	75	Pete Eglitis	Fr
OL	76	Hunter Albright	Fr
OL	77	Owen Aliciene	Fr
OL	78	Malachi Goodman	Fr
OL	79	Donnie Harbour	So
TE	80	Cooper Alexander	So
WR	81	Ben Whitver	Fr
WR	82	Ethan Black	Jr
TE	83	Brian Kortovich	Fr
WR	84	Peter Gonzalez	So
TE	84	Gabe Burkle	Sr
TE	87	Andrew Rappleyea	Jr
TE	89	Finn Furmanek	Jr

Defense

Pos.	#	Name	Class
DE	1	Ikenna Ezeogu	Sr
CB	2	Audavion Collins	Sr
S	3	Jamison Patton	Sr
S	4	Jeremiah Cooper	Sr
CB	5	Daryus Dixson	So
CB	7	Zion Tracy	Sr
LB	8	Kooper Ebel	Sr
LB	9	Cael Brezina	Sr
LB	10	Caleb Bacon	Sr
DE	11	LaVar Arrington II	So
CB	12	Xxavier Thomas	Fr
LB	13	Tony Rojas	Jr
CB	15	Joshua Johnson	Fr
CB	16	Donte Nastasi	Jr
CB	17	Josiah Zayas	Fr
DE	18	Max Granville	So
CB	20	Tyrell Chatman	Fr
S	21	Vaboue Toure	So
CB	23	Jahmir Joseph	Fr
S	24	Ibn McDaniels	So
LB	25	Alex Tatsch	So
LB	26	Cam Smith	Fr
S	27	Omarion Davis	So
S	28	Bryson Williams	Fr
CB	29	Hunter Sowell	Fr
S	30	Christian Askew	Fr
S	31	Marcus Neal Jr.	Jr
LB	32	John Klosterman	Sr
DE	33	Alexander McPherson	So
LB	34	Chris Fileppo	So
CB	35	Tyler Armstead	So
CB	37	Max Heffner	Fr
DT	39	Ty Blanding	Jr
S	39	Jashaun Green	Sr
S	40	Keian Kaiser	Fr
S	41	Jake Laverde	Fr
DE	42	Mason Robinson	Jr
LS	43	Dayshaun Burnett	Fr
LB	45	Josh Banks	Fr
LB	46	Evan Wolff	Fr
DE	47	Aidan Probst	So
DT	56	Alijah Carnell	So
DT	73	Caleb Brewer	So
DT	88	Elijah Reeder	Fr
DE	89	Jackson Ford	Fr
DE	90	Liam Andrews	So
DT	91	Armstrong Nnodim	So
DT	92	Siale Taupaki	Sr
DE	93	Bobby Mears	Jr
DT	94	De'Andre Cook	So
DT	95	Jordan Mayer	Jr
DT	97	Keanu Williams	Sr
DT	98	Dallas Vakalahi	Jr
DE	99	Yvan Kemajou	So

Special teams

Pos.	#	Name	Class
LS	35	Blaise Sokach-Minnick	Sr
P	38	Nathan Tiyce	So
LS	92	Andrew Dufault	So
K	94	Ryan Barker	Jr
K	95	Cristiano Rosa	Sr
K	98	Matthew Parker	Fr

Head coach

- Matt Campbell

Coordinators/assistant coaches

- Terry Smith – Associate head coach/defensive recruiting coordinator/cornerbacks
- Taylor Mouser – Offensive coordinator
- D'Anton Lynn – Defensive coordinator
- Justin Lustig – Special teams coordinator/outside linebackers/nickels
- Ikaika Malloe – Defensive line/Run game coordinator
- Tyson Veidt – Co-linebackers coach
- Dan Connor – Co-linebackers coach
- Savon Huggins – Running backs
- Kashif Moore – Wide receivers
- Jake Waters – Quarterbacks
- Deon Broomfield – Safeties/pass game coordinator
- Christian Smith – Edge rushers
- Ryan Clanton – Offensive line
- Amber Giese – Assistant AD/performance enhancement
- Jordan Lucas – Assistant cornerbacks coach

- Derek Hoodjer – General manager
- Skip Brebenec – Football Chief of Staff
- Matt Colangelo – Assistant special teams coach
- DeOn'tae Pannell – Assistant defensive line coach
- Jake Landry – Senior offensive analyst
- Shawn Collins – Defensive analyst
- Sheldon Croney – Assistant running backs coach
- Jackson Scott-Brown – Assistant offensive line coach
- Sean Seonbuchner – Assistant tight ends coach
- Trent Slattenow – Director of Player Personnel

Legend

- (C) Team captain
- (S) Suspended
- (I) Ineligible
- Injured
- Redshirt

Roster
Last update: July 20, 2026

=== Transfers ===
==== Outgoing ====
Player	Position	Destination
Bekkem Kritza	QB	Alabama A&M
Antoine Belgrave-Shorter	S	Arizona State
J'ven Williams	OT	Charlotte
Elliot Washington II	CB	Clemson
Sam Siafa	DL	Delaware
Owen Wafle	DL	Duke
Eagan Boyer	OT	Florida
TJ Shanahan Jr.	IOL	Florida
A. J. Harris	CB	Indiana
Alex Birchmeier	IOL	Liberty
Josiah Brown	WR	LIU
Brady O'Hara	IOL	Monmouth
King Mack	S	NC State
DaKaari Nelson	LB	NC State
Jaylen Harvey	EDGE	North Carolina
Enai White	DL	Oklahoma State
Andrew Olesh	TE	Oregon
Anthony Speca	LB	Purdue
Anthony Ivey	WR	San Jose State
Jabree Coleman	RB	South Carolina
Kaden Saunders	WR	Southern Miss
Matt Outten	WR	Syracuse
Kaleb Artis	DL	Temple
Kolin Dinkins	S	Temple
Joey Schlaffer	TE	Temple
Jaxon Smolik	QB	Temple
Amare Campbell	LB	Tennessee
Chaz Coleman	DE	Tennessee
Xavier Gilliam	DL	Tennessee
Dejuan Lane	S	Tennessee
Kari Jackson	LB	Toledo
Corey Smith	RB	Toledo
Zuriah Fisher	DE	USC
Randy Adirika	DL	Virginia Tech
Tyseer Denmark	WR	Virginia Tech
Jeff Exinor Jr.	WR	Virginia Tech
Ethan Grunkemeyer	QB	Virginia Tech
Cortez Harris	EDGE	Virginia Tech
Matt Henderson	TE	Virginia Tech
Daniel Jennings	EDGE	Virginia Tech
Luke Reynolds	TE	Virginia Tech
Michael Troutman III	IOL	Virginia Tech
Mylachi Williams	EDGE	Virginia Tech
Kenny Woseley Jr.	CB	Virginia Tech
Keon Wylie	LB	Virginia Tech
Tikey Hayes	RB	Unknown
Lamont Payne Jr.	S	Unknown

==== Incoming ====
Player	Position	Former Team
Omarion Davis	S	Boston College
Connor Barry	QB	Christopher Newport
Alexander McPherson	EDGE	Colorado
Keith Jones Jr.	WR	Grambling State
Cooper Alexander	TE	Iowa State
Caleb Bacon	LB	Iowa State
Rocco Becht	QB	Iowa State
Benjamin Brahmer	TE	Iowa State
Cael Brezina	LB	Iowa State
Karon Brookins	WR	Iowa State
Trevor Buhr	IOL	Iowa State
Gabe Burkle	TE	Iowa State
Alijah Carnell	DL	Iowa State
Jeremiah Cooper	S	Iowa State
Kooper Ebel	LB	Iowa State
Brett Eskildsen	WR	Iowa State
Ikenna Ezeogu	DL	Iowa State
Carson Hansen	RB	Iowa State
Vaea Ikakoula	IOL	Iowa State
John Klosterman	LB	Iowa State
Kuol Kuol II	OT	Iowa State
Alex Manske	QB	Iowa State
Marcus Neal Jr.	S	Iowa State
Jamison Patton	S	Iowa State
Zay Robinson	WR	Iowa State
Chase Sowell	WR	Iowa State
Hunter Sowell	S	Iowa State
Will Tompkins	OT	Iowa State
Nathan Tiyce	P	Mississippi State
James Peoples	RB	Ohio State
Armstrong Nnodim	DL	Oklahoma State
Ibn McDaniels	CB	Syracuse
Brock Riker	IOL	Texas State
Tyshon Huff	IOL	Tiffin
Siale Taupaki	DL	UCLA
Keanu Williams	DL	UCLA
Dallas Vakalahi	DL	Utah
Chris Fileppo	S	West Virginia
