= 2026 Buffalo Bulls football team =

American college football season

2026 Buffalo Bulls football
- Conference: Mid-American Conference
- Record: 8–3 (6–1 MAC)
- Head coach: Pete Lembo (3rd season)
- Offensive coordinator: Tony Tokarz (1st season)
- Offensive scheme: Multiple
- Defensive coordinator: Brian Dougherty (1st season)
- Base defense: Multiple
- Home stadium: Broadview Stadium

2026 Mid-American Conference football standings
	Conf.			Overall
Team	W		L	W		L
Ohio	6	–	1	8	–	3
Western Michigan	6	–	1	8	–	3
Buffalo	6	–	1	8	–	3
Toledo	5	–	1	8	–	2
Miami (OH)	5	–	2	7	–	4
Bowling Green	3	–	3	3	–	7
Central Michigan	3	–	4	5	–	6
Eastern Michigan	3	–	4	4	–	7
UMass	2	–	5	5	–	6
Kent State	2	–	5	3	–	8
Ball State	2	–	5	3	–	8
Akron	1	–	6	2	–	9
Sacramento State	1	–	7	2	–	9
Championship: December 5, 2026
As of November 20, 2026; Rankings from AP poll

The 2026 Buffalo Bulls football team will represent the University at Buffalo as they are a member of the Mid-American Conference (MAC) during the 2026 NCAA Division I FBS football season. Led by their third-year head coach Pete Lembo, the Bulls will play home games at Broadview Stadium in Amherst, New York.

== Schedule ==
Date	Time	Opponent	Site	TV	Result	Attendance
September 3	7:00 p.m.	Albany*	Broadview Stadium; Amherst, NY	ESPN+	W 21–17	8,690
September 12	6:00 p.m.	at FIU*	Pitbull Stadium; Miami, FL	ESPN+	L 20–33	18,202
September 19	12:00 p.m.	at No. 14 Penn State*	Beaver Stadium; University Park, PA	BTN	L 13–55	103,817
September 26	3:30 p.m.	Robert Morris*^{†}	Broadview Stadium; Amherst, NY	ESPN+	W 31–28	11,449
October 3	1:00 p.m.	Western Michigan	Broadview Stadium; Amherst, NY	ESPN+	L 17–20	6,350
October 10	3:30 p.m.	at Toledo	Glass Bowl; Toledo, OH	ESPN+	W 23–8	24,767
October 17	1:00 p.m.	UMass	Broadview Stadium; Amherst, NY	ESPN+	W 25–18 ^{OT}	6,037
October 24	3:30 p.m.	Bowling Green	Broadview Stadium; Amherst, NY	ESPN+	W 31–24	5,988
November 3	8:00 p.m.	at Miami (OH)	Yager Stadium; Oxford, OH	ESPN	W 34–31 ^{OT}	10,618
November 11	7:30 p.m.	at Ball State	Scheumann Stadium; Muncie, IN	ESPN2	W 28–7	6,745
November 18	7:30 p.m.	Central Michigan	Broadview Stadium; Amherst, NY	ESPNU	W 40–21	5,452
November 27	12:00 p.m.	at Akron	InfoCision Stadium; Akron, OH	CBSSN		
*Non-conference game; ^{†}Homecoming; Rankings from AP Poll and CFP Rankings released prior to game; All times are in Eastern time

== Preseason ==
=== Preseason polls ===
==== Coaches Poll ====
On July 22, the MAC announced the preseason coaches poll. Western Michigan was named the preseason favorite to win the conference while last year's other finalist, Miami, also received votes to win the championship.

MAC Coaches poll
Predicted finish	Team	Votes (1st place)
1	Western Michigan	138 (9)
2	Miami	134 (4)
3	Toledo	115
4	Ohio	107
5	Central Michigan	101
6	Buffalo	81
7	Eastern Michigan	76
8	Kent State	64
9	Bowling Green	59
10	Akron	52
11	Ball State	34
12	Sacramento State	28
13	Massachusetts	25

Coaches poll (MAC Championship)
Predicted finish	Team	Votes
1	Western Michigan	9
2	Miami	4

== Game summaries ==
=== Albany (FCS) ===
Albany Great Danes (FCS) (1–0) at Buffalo Bulls (0–0) – Game summary

Quarter	1	2	3	4	Total
Great Danes (FCS)	7	3	7	0	17
Bulls	0	14	0	7	21

at Broadview Stadium • Amherst, NY

- Date: September 3
- Game time: 7:00 p.m. (Note: After a lengthy weather delay, the game kicked off at 9:43 p.m.)
- Game weather: Sunny • Temperature: 77 °F (25 °C)
- Game attendance: 8,690
- Referee: Billy Williams
- TV announcers (ESPN+): Michael Reghi and Je'Rod Cherry

Game information

First quarter

- ALB – Tavahri Groves 14-yard pass from Kai Colon (RJ Kocan kick), 3:02. Great Danes 7–0. Drive: 5 plays, 86 yards, 2:13.

Second quarter

- BUFF – Chance Morrow 9-yard pass from Elijah Holmes (Oliver Hautanen kick), 11:23. Tied 7–7. Drive: 15 plays, 75 yards, 6:39.
- BUFF – Chance Morrow 4-yard pass from Elijah Holmes (Oliver Hautanen kick), 2:46. Bulls 14–7. Drive: 7 plays, 44 yards, 2:27.
- ALB – RJ Kocan 46-yard field goal, 0:15. Bulls 14–10. Drive: 6 plays, 21 yards, 0:31.

Third quarter

- ALB – Justus Murray Jr. 14-yard pass from Kai Colon (RJ Kocan kick), 3:23. Great Danes 17–14. Drive: 5 plays, 27 yards, 1:10.

Fourth quarter

- BUFF – Chance Morrow 5-yard pass from Elijah Holmes (Oliver Hautanen kick), 4:53. Bulls 21–17. Drive: 8 plays, 61 yards, 1:50.

In their first game of the season, the Bulls won, 21–17 over the Albany Great Danes.

Statistics	ALB	BUFF
First downs	19	18
Plays–yards	72–276	80–340
Rushes–yards	31–72	33–151
Passing yards	204	189
Passing: comp–att–int	19–41–1	26–47–0
Turnovers	1	1
Time of possession	28:07	31:53

Team	Category	Player	Statistics
Albany	Passing	Kai Colon	16/36, 191 yards, 2 TD, INT
Albany	Rushing	Joey Koch	8 carries, 40 yards
Albany	Receiving	BJ Norman	6 receptions, 67 yards
Buffalo	Passing	Elijah Holmes	26/47, 189 yards, 3 TD
Buffalo	Rushing	Messiah Burch	8 carries, 74 yards
Buffalo	Receiving	Chance Morrow	7 receptions, 48 yards, 3 TD

=== at FIU ===
Buffalo Bulls (1–0) at FIU Panthers (0–1) – Game summary

Quarter	1	2	3	4	Total
Bulls	3	3	8	6	20
Panthers	14	7	9	3	33

at Pitbull Stadium • Miami, FL

- Date: September 12
- Game time: 6:00 p.m.
- Game weather: Cloudy • Temperature: 83 °F (28 °C)
- Game attendance: 18,202
- Referee: Stuart Mullins
- TV announcers (ESPN+): Corey Brooks, Jermon Bushrod, Billy Gil, and Sydney Jones

Game information

First quarter

- FIU – Maguire Anderson 45-yard pass from JJ Kohl (Robert Czeremcha kick), 9:32. Panthers 7–0. Drive: 6 plays, 87 yards, 3:59.
- BUFF – Oliver Hautanen 51-yard field goal, 6:27. Panthers 7–3. Drive: 9 plays, 41 yards, 3:13.
- FIU – JJ Kohl 19-yard pass from Jojo Stone (Robert Czeremcha kick), 3:37. Panthers 14–3. Drive: 4 plays, 75 yards, 0:51.

Second quarter

- FIU – Maguire Anderson 14-yard pass from JJ Kohl (Robert Czeremcha kick), 2:25. Panthers 21–3. Drive: 9 plays, 60 yards, 4:18.
- BUFF – Oliver Hautanen 45-yard field goal, 1:49. Panthers 21–6. Drive: 10 plays, 47 yards, 5:11.

Third quarter

- BUFF – Chance Morrow 2-yard pass from Jason Wright (Jason Wright run), 9:35. Panthers 21–14. Drive: 6 plays, 64 yards, 3:51.
- FIU – Jojo Stone 68-yard pass from JJ Kohl (Robert Czeremcha kick BLOCKED), 8:03. Panthers 27–14. Drive: 3 plays, 75 yards, 1:32.
- FIU – Robert Czeremcha 36-yard field goal, 3:43. Panthers 30–14. Drive: 9 plays, 58 yards, 3:21.

Fourth quarter

- FIU – Robert Czeremcha 35-yard field goal, 8:22. Panthers 33–14. Drive: 7 plays, 19 yards, 2:40.
- BUFF – Chance Morrow 23-yard pass from Jason Wright (run failed), 5:58. Panthers 33–20. Drive: 8 plays, 75 yards, 2:24.

Statistics	BUFF	FIU
First downs	13	22
Plays–yards	66–308	76–540
Rushes–yards	25–62	39–154
Passing yards	246	386
Passing: Comp–Att–Int	22–41–1	22–37–0
Turnovers	3	1
Time of possession	26:43	33:17

Team	Category	Player	Statistics
Buffalo	Passing	Jason Wright	13/27, 185 yards, 2 TD, INT
Buffalo	Rushing	Terrance Shelton Jr.	8 carries, 29 yards
Buffalo	Receiving	Chance Morrow	11 receptions, 170 yards, 2 TD
FIU	Passing	JJ Kohl	21/36, 367 yards, 3 TD
FIU	Rushing	Anthony Carrie	13 carries, 49 yards
FIU	Receiving	Jojo Stone	5 receptions, 106 yards, TD

=== at No. 14 Penn State ===
Buffalo Bulls (1–1) at No. 14 Penn State Nittany Lions (2–0) – Game summary

Quarter	1	2	3	4	Total
Bulls	3	3	0	7	13
No. 14 Nittany Lions	17	17	14	7	55

at Beaver Stadium • University Park, PA

- Date: September 19
- Game time: 12:00 p.m.
- Game weather: Mostly Cloudy • Temperature: 63 °F (17 °C)
- Game attendance: 103,817
- Referee: Kole Knueppel
- TV announcers (BTN): Chris Vosters (play-by-play), Matt Millen (analyst) and Caroline Hendershot (sideline)

Game information

First quarter

- PSU – Ryan Barker, 48-yard field goal, 11:53 (3–0 PSU)
- PSU – James Peoples, 16-yard TD run, Barker kick, 8:00 (10–0 PSU)
- PSU – Andrew Rappleyea, 3-yard TD pass from Rocco Becht, Barker kick, 6:19 (17–0 PSU)
- UB – Oliver Hautanen, 21-yard field goal, 1:39 (17–3 PSU)

Second quarter

- PSU – Ryan Barker, 25-yard field goal, 14:14 (20–3 PSU)
- PSU – Koby Howard, 20-yard TD run, Barker kick, 10:47 (27–3 PSU)
- PSU – Howard, 70-yard TD pass from Becht, Barker kick, 2:31 (34–3 PSU)
- UB – Hautanen, 38-yard field goal, 0:00 (34–6 PSU)

Third quarter

- PSU – Carson Hansen, 12-yard TD run, Barker kick, 11:29 (41–6 PSU)
- PSU – Peoples, 11-yard TD run, Barker kick, 8:14 (48–6 PSU)

Fourth quarter

- PSU – Cam Wallace, 59-yard TD run, Matthew Parker kick, 12:31 (55–6 PSU)
- UB – James McNeil Jr., 1-yard TD run, Hautanen kick, 5:01 (55–13 PSU)

Statistics	BUFF	PSU
First downs	13	25
Plays–yards	63–173	67–573
Rushes–yards	38–113	41–304
Passing yards	60	269
Passing: comp–att–int	10–25–0	15–26–0
Turnovers	2	0
Time of possession	28:37	31:23

Team	Category	Player	Statistics
Buffalo	Passing	Jason Wright	10/25, 60 yards
Buffalo	Rushing	James McNeil Jr.	20 carries, 80 yards, TD
Buffalo	Receiving	Chance Morrow	2 receptions, 31 yards
PSU	Passing	Rocco Becht	11/19, 212 yards, 2 TD
PSU	Rushing	Quinton Martin Jr.	10 carries, 100 yards
PSU	Receiving	Koby Howard	3 receptions, 115 yards, TD

=== Robert Morris (FCS) ===
Robert Morris Colonials (FCS) (2–1) at Buffalo Bulls (1–2) – Game summary

Quarter	1	2	3	4	Total
Colonials (FCS)	7	7	0	14	28
Bulls	0	14	7	10	31

at Broadview Stadium • Amherst, NY

- Date: September 26
- Game time: 3:30 p.m.
- Game weather: Sunny • Temperature: 71 °F (22 °C)
- Game attendance: 11,149
- Referee: John Shay
- TV announcers (ESPN+): Joey Lindstrom and Tre Watson

Game information

First quarter

- RMU – Xavier Goulbourne 29-yard TD run (Lucca Valens kick), 9:42. Colonials 7–0. Drive: 3 plays, 33 yards, 1:31.

Second quarter

- BUFF – Nino Hill 4-yard TD run (Oliver Hautanen kick), 8:57. Tied 7–7. Drive: 16 plays, 75 yards, 7:24.
- RMU – Carson Haggard 50-yard TD run (Lucca Valens kick), 6:08. Colonials 14–7. Drive: 6 plays, 75 yards, 2:49.
- BUFF – Jason Wright 25-yard TD run (Oliver Hautanen kick), 0:27. Tied 14–14. Drive: 5 plays, 65 yards, 0:32.

Third quarter

- BUFF – Nino Hill 1-yard TD run (Oliver Hautanen kick), 7:52. Bulls 21–14. Drive: 14 plays, 63 yards, 7:03.

Fourth quarter

- BUFF – Chance Morrow 9-yard pass from Jason Wright (Oliver Hautanen kick), 11:56. Bulls 28–14. Drive: 5 plays, 39 yards, 2:14.
- RMU – Khalil Hunter 0-yard fumble return (Lucca Valens kick), 9:24. Bulls 28–21. Drive: 3 plays, 5 yards, 1:10.
- BUFF – Oliver Hautanen 48-yard field goal, 5:49. Bulls 31–21. Drive: 7 plays, 30 yards, 3:29.
- RMU – Noah Schaerli 32-yard pass from Carson Haggard (Lucca Valens kick), 1:46. Bulls 31–28. Drive: 5 plays, 81 yards, 0:46.

Statistics	RMU	BUFF
First downs	14	27
Plays–yards	53–316	91–442
Rushes–yards	22–153	63–302
Passing yards	163	140
Passing: comp–att–int	13–31–0	15–28–2
Turnovers	0	3
Time of possession	20:45	39:15

Team	Category	Player	Statistics
Robert Morris	Passing	Carson Haggard	13/31, 163 yards, TD
Robert Morris	Rushing	Xavier Goulbourne	12 carries, 77 yards, TD
Robert Morris	Receiving	Tyreke Jinks	2 receptions, 42 yards
Buffalo	Passing	Jason Wright	15/28, 140 yards, TD, 2 INT
Buffalo	Rushing	Messiah Burch	26 carries, 146 yards
Buffalo	Receiving	Chance Morrow	5 receptions, 58 yards, TD

=== Western Michigan ===
Western Michigan Broncos (2–2) at Buffalo Bulls (2–2) – Game summary

Quarter	1	2	3	4	Total
Broncos	7	3	0	10	20
Bulls	7	7	0	3	17

at Broadview Stadium • Amherst, NY

- Date: October 3
- Game time: 1:00 p.m.
- Game weather: Sunny • Temperature: 57 °F (14 °C)
- Game attendance: 6,350
- Referee: Andrew Speciale
- TV announcers (ESPN+): Shawn Kenney (play-by-play) and Mo Hasan (analyst)

Game information

First quarter

- WMU – Jalen Buckley 9-yd TD run (Dieter Kelly kick), 9:13. Broncos 7–0. Drive: 7 plays, 59 yards, 4:09.
- BUFF – Patrick Clacks III 59-yard pass from Jason Wright (Oliver Hautanen kick), 9:05. Tied 7–7. Drive: 1 play, 59 yards, 0:08.

Second quarter

- BUFF – Messiah Burch 1-yard TD run (Oliver Hautanen kick), 14:23. Bulls 14–7. Drive: 13 plays, 63 yards, 6:12.
- WMU – Dieter Kelly 43-yard field goal, 1:46. Bulls 14–10. Drive: 8 plays, 50 yards, 3:32.

Third quarter

- No scoring plays

Fourth quarter

- BUFF – Oliver Hautanen 35-yard field goal, 13:00. Bulls 17–10. Drive: 10 plays, 58 yards, 4:34.
- WMU – Broc Lowry 5-yard TD run (Dieter Kelly kick), 6:44. Tied 17–17. Drive: 11 plays, 75 yards, 6:16.
- WMU – Dieter Kelly 38-yard field goal, 1:19. Broncos 20–17. Drive: 11 plays, 59 yards, 2:55.

Statistics	WMU	BUFF
First downs	20	21
Plays–yards	61–327	65–305
Rushes–yards	37–115	47–135
Passing yards	212	170
Passing: comp–att–int	19–24–0	11–18–0
Turnovers	0	0
Time of possession	31:55	28:05

Team	Category	Player	Statistics
Western Michigan	Passing	Broc Lowry	19/24, 212 yards
Western Michigan	Rushing	Jalen Buckley	15 carries, 62 yards, TD
Western Michigan	Receiving	Nate Levicki	4 receptions, 76 yards
Buffalo	Passing	Jason Wright	11/18, 170 yards, TD
Buffalo	Rushing	Messiah Burch	23 carries, 106 yards, TD
Buffalo	Receiving	Chance Morrow	7 receptions, 90 yards

=== at Toledo ===
Buffalo Bulls (2–3) at Toledo Rockets (4–1) – Game summary

Quarter	1	2	3	4	Total
Bulls	6	7	3	7	23
Rockets	0	0	0	8	8

at Glass Bowl • Toldeo, OH

- Date: October 10
- Game time: 3:30 p.m.
- Game weather: Cloudy • Temperature: 74 °F (23 °C) • Wind: SE at 7 miles per hour (11 km/h)
- Game attendance: 24,767
- Referee: Rick Warne
- TV announcers (ESPN+): Doug Sherman (play-by-play) and Forest Conoly (analyst)

Game information

First quarter

- BUF – Oliver Hautanen 24-yard field goal, 10:24. Bulls 3–0. Drive: 12 plays, 69 yards, 4:36.
- BUF – Oliver Hautanen 29-yard field goal, 3:11. Bulls 6–0. Drive: 12 plays, 72 yards, 4:17.

Second quarter

- BUF – Jason Wright 3-yard run (Oliver Hautanen kick), 5:21. Bulls 13–0. Drive: 4 plays, 11 yards, 1:59.

Third quarter

- BUF – Oliver Hautanen 31-yard field goal, 9:52. Bulls 16–0. Drive: 8 plays, 25 yards, 3:39.

Fourth quarter

- TOL – Connor Walendzak 1-yard run (John Alan Richter–Adjatay Dabbs pass), 4:45. Bulls 16–8. Drive: 14 plays, 86 yards, 4:39.
- BUF – Messiah Burch 87-yard run (Oliver Hautanen kick), 4:30. Bulls 23–8. Drive: 1 plays, 87 yards, 0:15.

Statistics	BUFF	TOL
First downs	22	16
Plays–yards	78–351	61–308
Rushes–yards	47–180	26–105
Passing yards	171	203
Passing: comp–att–int	14–31–0	22–35–0
Turnovers	0	3
Time of possession	35:25	24:35

Team	Category	Player	Statistics
Buffalo	Passing	Jason Wright	14/31, 171 yards
Buffalo	Rushing	Messiah Burch	17 carries, 137 yards, TD
Buffalo	Receiving	Dwayne Early Jr.	4 receptions, 77 yards
Toledo	Passing	John Alan Richter	22/35, 203 yards
Toledo	Rushing	Connor Walendzak	10 carries, 50 yards, TD
Toledo	Receiving	Terrell Crosby Jr.	8 receptions, 69 yards

=== UMass ===
UMass Minutemen (4–2) at Buffalo Bulls (3–3) – Game summary

Quarter	1	2	3	4	OT	Total
Minutemen	7	8	0	3	0	18
Bulls	3	5	7	3	7	25

at Broadview Stadium • Amherst, NY

- Date: October 17
- Game time: 1:00 p.m.
- Game weather: Sunny • Temperature: 45 °F (7 °C)
- Game attendance: 6,037
- Referee: Rich Edwards
- TV announcers (ESPN+): Anthony Lima (play-by-play) and Mo Hasan (analyst)

Game information

First quarter

- MASS – Logan Inagawa 20-yard TD run (Derek Morris kick), 10:08. Minutemen 7–0 Drive: 11 plays, 75 yards, 4:52.
- BUFF – Oliver Hautanen 26-yard field goal, 7:26. Minutemen 7–3. Drive: 6 plays, 13 yards, 2:31.

Second quarter

- BUFF – Logan Inagawa sacked in the end zone by Sedrick Vessah for a safety, 9:06. Minutemen 7–5.
- BUFF – Oliver Hautanen 33-yard field goal, 4:40. Bulls 8–7. Drive: 4 plays, 0 yards, 0:18.
- MASS – Elijah Faulkner 2-yd TD run (Logan Inagawa pass to Jabari Lewis for two-point conversion), 1:32. Minutemen 15–8. Drive: 3 plays, 3 yards, 0:19.

Third quarter

- BUFF – Clint Walker 2-yard pass from Jason Wright (Oliver Hautanen kick), 10:47. Tied 15–15. Drive: 10 plays, 75 yards, 4:13.

Fourth quarter

- MASS – Derek Morris 53-yard field goal, 1:57. Minutemen 18–15. Drive: 8 plays, 26 yards, 4:33.
- BUFF – Oliver Hautanen 29-yard field goal, 0:02. Tied 18–18. Drive: 14 plays, 65 yards, 1:57.

Overtime

- BUFF – Clint Walker 15-yard pass from Jason Wright (Oliver Hautanen kick). Bulls 25–18. Drive: 3 plays, 24 yards.

Statistics	MASS	BUFF
First downs	17	19
Plays–yards	72–339	79–351
Rushes–yards	47–171	44–217
Passing yards	168	134
Passing: comp–att–int	14–25–1	16–35–1
Turnovers	2	2
Time of possession	31:30	28:30

Team	Category	Player	Statistics
UMass	Passing	Logan Inagawa	14/25, 168 yards, 1 INT
UMass	Rushing	Elijah Faulkner	23 carries, 84 yards, TD
UMass	Receiving	Kezion Dia-Johnson	5 receptions, 79 yards
Buffalo	Passing	Jason Wright	16/35, 134 yards, 2 TDs, 1 INT
Buffalo	Rushing	Messiah Burch	28 carries, 172 yards
Buffalo	Receiving	Clint Walker	7 receptions, 45 yards, 2 TDs

=== Bowling Green ===
Bowling Green Falcons (2–5) at Buffalo Bulls (4–3) – Game summary

Quarter	1	2	3	4	Total
Falcons	7	7	7	3	24
Bulls	7	7	7	10	31

at Broadview Stadium • Amherst, NY

- Date: October 24
- Game time: 3:30 p.m.
- Game weather: Sunny • Temperature: 64 °F (18 °C)
- Game attendance: 5,988
- Referee: Marcel Kerr
- TV announcers (ESPN+): Anthony Lima (play-by-play) and Ryan Cavanaugh (analyst)

Game information

First quarter

- BUFF – Messiah Burch 11-yard TD run (Oliver Hautanen kick), 9:03. Bulls 7–0. Drive: 8 plays, 67 yards, 2:57.
- BGU – Isaiah Dawson 18-yard pass from Jay Kastantin (Travis Kenner kick), 1:01. Tied 7–7. Drive: 13 plays, 71 yards, 7:56.

Second quarter

- BGU – Trey Johnson 40-yard pass from Jay Kastantin (Travis Kenner kick), 9:03. Falcons 14–7. Drive: 9 plays, 75 yards, 5:46.
- BUFF – Clint Walker 14-yard pass from Jason Wright (Oliver Hautanen kick), 0:29. Tied 14–14. Drive: 8 plays, 63 yards, 1:26.

Third quarter

- BGU – Nakai Amachree 13-yard pass from Jay Kastantin (Travis Kenner kick), 10:13. Falcons 21–14. Drive: 4 plays, 30 yards, 1:38.
- BUFF – Messiah Burch 2-yard TD run (Oliver Hautanen kick), 8:11. Tied 21–21. Drive: 6 plays, 75 yards, 2:02.

Fourth quarter

- BUFF – Oliver Hautanen 31-yard field goal, 14:53. Bulls 24–21. Drive: 13 plays, 50 yards, 5:58.
- BUFF – Messiah Burch 73-yard TD run (Oliver Hautanen kick), 12:18. Bulls 31–21. Drive: 1 play, 73 yards, 0:12.
- BGU – Travis Kenner 26-yard field goal, 3:33. Bulls 31–24. Drive: 9 plays, 63 yards, 5:12.

Statistics	BGSU	BUFF
First downs	17	19
Plays–yards	63–341	62–378
Rushes–yards	36–124	41–251
Passing yards	217	127
Passing: comp–att–int	19–27–2	13–21–0
Turnovers	2	1
Time of possession	35:45	24:15

Team	Category	Player	Statistics
Bowling Green	Passing	Jay Kastantin	19/27, 217 yards, 3 TDs, 2 INTs
Bowling Green	Rushing	Austyn Dendy	10 carries, 39 yards
Bowling Green	Receiving	Winn Sharp	5 receptions, 50 yards
Buffalo	Passing	Jason Wright	13/21, 127 yards, 1 TD
Buffalo	Rushing	Messiah Burch	33 carries, 184 yards, 3 TDs
Buffalo	Receiving	Clint Walker	2 receptions, 40 yards, 1 TD

=== at Miami (OH) ===
Buffalo Bulls (5–3) at Miami RedHawks (5–3) – Game summary

Quarter	1	2	3	4	OT	Total
Bulls	3	7	6	15	3	34
RedHawks	7	10	7	7	0	31

at Yager Stadium • Oxford, OH

- Date: November 3
- Game time: 8:00 p.m.
- Game weather: Cloudy • Temperature: 66 °F (19 °C)
- Game attendance: 10,618
- Referee: Rich Edwards
- TV announcers (ESPN): Clay Matvick (play-by-play) and Rocky Boiman (analyst)

Game information

First quarter

- BUFF – Oliver Hautanen 33-yard field goal, 10:49. Bulls 3–0. Drive: 7 plays, 52 yards, 2:46.
- M-OH – Braylon Isom 21-yard pass from Caleb Heavner (Kellan McLaughlin kick), 5:25. RedHawks 7–3. Drive: 9 plays, 75 yards, 5:24.

Second quarter

- M-OH – Rodney Nelson 10-yard TD run (Kellan McLaughlin kick), 14:14. RedHawks 14–3. Drive: 8 plays, 63 yards, 4:16.
- BUFF – Jason Wright 1-yard TD run (Oliver Hautanen kick), 2:28. RedHawks 14–10. Drive: 9 plays, 80 yards, 3:33.
- M-OH – Kellan McLaughlin 35-yard field goal, 0:26. RedHawks 17–10. Drive: 12 plays, 58 yards, 2:02.

Third quarter

- M-OH – Scoop Smith 37-yard return of a blocked punt (Kellan McLaughlin kick), 14:02. RedHawks 24–10.
- BUFF – Chance Morrow 1-yard pass from Jason Wright (Oliver Hautanen kick failed), 1:30. RedHawks 24–16. Drive: 10 plays, 76 yards, 3:50.

Fourth quarter

- M-OH – Scoop Smith 6-yard TD run (Kellan McLaughlin kick), 12:01. RedHawks 31–16. Drive: 10 plays, 75 yards, 4:29.
- BUFF – Chance Morrow 4-yard pass from Jason Wright (Jason Wright–Chance Morrow pass), 8:56. RedHawks 31–24. Drive: 11 plays, 75 yards, 3:05.
- BUFF – Jason Wright 2-yd TD run (Oliver Hautanen kick), 1:35. Tied 31–31. Drive: 12 plays, 80 yards, 3:27.

Overtime

- BUFF – Oliver Hautanen 27-yard field goal. Bulls 34–31. Drive: 7 plays, 16 yards.

Statistics	BUFF	M-OH
First downs	29	23
Plays–yards	79–459	71–350
Rushes–yards	33–101	48–196
Passing yards	358	154
Passing: comp–att–int	22–46–2	12–23–0
Turnovers	2	0
Time of possession	27:24	32:36

Team	Category	Player	Statistics
Buffalo	Passing	Jason Wright	22/46, 358 yards, 2 TDs, 2 INT
Buffalo	Rushing	Messiah Burch	14 carries, 56 yards
Buffalo	Receiving	Chance Morrow	12 receptions, 199 yards, 2 TDs
Miami (OH)	Passing	Caleb Heavner	12/23, 154 yards, TD
Miami (OH)	Rushing	D'Shawntae Jones	17 carries, 112 yards
Miami (OH)	Receiving	Braylon Isom	7 receptions, 89 yards, TD

=== at Ball State ===
Buffalo Bulls (6–3) at Ball State Cardinals (3–6) – Game summary

Quarter	1	2	3	4	Total
Bulls	0	7	7	14	28
Cardinals	7	0	0	0	7

at Scheumann Stadium • Muncie, IN

- Date: November 11
- Game time: 7:45 p.m.
- Game weather: Rain • Temperature: 54 °F (12 °C) • Wind: NE at 5 miles per hour (8.0 km/h)
- Game attendance: 6,745
- Referee: Billy Williams
- TV announcers (ESPN2): Ted Emrich (play-by-play) and Fozzy Whittaker (analyst)

Game information

First quarter

- BALL – Gabe Aramboles 0-yard blocked punt return (Brody Boehm kick), 1:47. Cardinals 7–0. Drive: 6 plays, 6 yards, 3:13.

Second quarter

- BUFF – Chance Morrow 14-yard pass from Jason Wright (Oliver Hautanen kick), 4:04. Tied 7–7. Drive: 11 plays, 80 yards, 6:00.

Third quarter

- BUFF – Messiah Burch 2-yard TD run (Oliver Hautanen kick), 3:10. Bulls 14–7. Drive: 12 plays, 79 yards, 6:10.

Fourth quarter

- BUFF – Messiah Burch 67-yard TD run (Oliver Hautanen kick), 4:04. Bulls 21–7. Drive: 2 plays, 67 yards, 0:54.
- BUFF – Terrance Shelton Jr. 29-yard TD run (Oliver Hautanen kick), 3:58. Bulls 28–7. Drive: 1 play, 29 yards, 0:04.

Statistics	BUFF	BALL
First downs	19	19
Plays–yards	66–350	72–325
Rushes–yards	52–302	33–189
Passing yards	48	136
Passing: comp–att–int	5–14–0	20–39–0
Turnovers	0	0
Time of possession	31:56	28:04

Team	Category	Player	Statistics
Buffalo	Passing	Jason Wright	5/14, 48 yards, TD
Buffalo	Rushing	Messiah Burch	31 carries, 209 yards, 2 TDs
Buffalo	Receiving	Clint Walker	1 reception, 30 yards
Ball State	Passing	Keldric Luster	20/39, 136 yards
Ball State	Rushing	TJ Horton	11 carries, 92 yards
Ball State	Receiving	Donovan Hamilton	11 receptions, 104 yards

=== Central Michigan ===
Central Michigan Chippewas (5–5) at Buffalo Bulls (7–3) – Game summary

Quarter	1	2	3	4	Total
Chippewas	7	7	7	0	21
Bulls	3	17	13	7	40

at Broadview Stadium • Amherst, NY

- Date: November 18
- Game time: 7:30 p.m.
- Game weather: Clear • Temperature: 46 °F (8 °C) • Wind: NE at 6 miles per hour (9.7 km/h)
- Game attendance: 5,452
- Referee: Andrew Speciale
- TV announcers (ESPNU): Matt Schick (play-by-play) and Ryan Cavanaugh (analyst)

Game information

First quarter

- CMU – Braylen Naves 32 yard pass from Jadyn Glasser (Braxton Doak kick), 8:33. Chippewas 7–0. Drive: 11 plays, 75 yards, 6:27.
- BUFF – Oliver Hautanen 27 yard field goal, 3:54. Chippewas 7–3. Drive: 11 plays, 55 yards, 4:33.

Second quarter

- BUFF – Oliver Hautanen 26 yard field goal, 13:38. Chippewas 7–6. Drive: 9 plays, 33 yards, 5:11.
- BUFF – Messiah Burch 10-yard TD run (Oliver Hautanen kick), 12:07. Bulls 13–7. Drive: 4 plays, 26 yards, 1:25.
- CMU – Myles Peters 5 yard pass from Jadyn Glasser (Braxton Doak kick), 0:39. Chippewas 14–13. Drive: 6 plays, 45 yards, 0:41.
- BUFF – Chance Morrow 17 yard pass from Jason Wright (Oliver Hautanen kick), 0:04. Bulls 20–14. Drive: 4 plays, 66 yards, 0:29.

Third quarter

- BUFF – Jason Wright 1-yard TD run (Jason Wright–Jaylen Andrews pass failed), 10:46. Bulls 26–14. Drive: 9 plays, 75 yards, 4:14.
- CMU – Brock Townsend 2 yard pass from Jadyn Glasser (Braxton Doak kick), 3:55. Bulls 26–21. Drive: 12 plays, 75 yards, 6:51.
- BUFF – Messiah Burch 75-yard TD run (Oliver Hautanen kick), 3:45. Bulls 33–21. Drive: 1 play, 75 yards, 0:09.

Fourth quarter

- BUFF – Terrance Shelton Jr. 2-yard TD run (Oliver Hautanen kick), 10:45. Bulls 40–21. Drive: 7 plays, 65 yards, 4:09.

Statistics	CMU	BUFF
First downs	19	19
Plays–yards	66–324	57–435
Rushes–yards	43–196	44–283
Passing yards	128	152
Passing: comp–att–int	14–23–2	6–13–0
Turnovers	3	0
Time of possession	31:30	28:30

Team	Category	Player	Statistics
Central Michigan	Passing	Jadyn Glasser	10/19, 101 yards, 3 TDs, 2 INT
Central Michigan	Rushing	Jayden Clerveaux	15 carries, 70 yards
Central Michigan	Receiving	Braylen Naves	2 receptions, 49 yads, TD
Buffalo	Passing	Jason Wright	6/13, 152 yards, 1 TD
Buffalo	Rushing	Messiah Burch	24 carries, 200 yards, 2 TDs
Buffalo	Receiving	Jaylen Andrews	2 receptions, 64 yards

=== at Akron ===
Buffalo Bulls (8–3) at Akron Zips (2–9) – Game summary

Quarter	1	2	3	4	Total
Bulls	0	0	0	0	0
Zips	0	0	0	0	0

at InfoCision Stadium • Akron, OH

- Date: November 27
- Game time: 12:00 p.m.
- TV: CBSSN

Game information

First quarter
Second quarter
Third quarter
Fourth quarter

Statistics	BUFF	AKR
First downs		
Plays–yards		
Rushes–yards		
Passing yards		
Passing: comp–att–int		
Turnovers		
Time of possession		

Team	Category	Player	Statistics
Buffalo	Passing		
Buffalo	Rushing		
Buffalo	Receiving		
Akron	Passing		
Akron	Rushing		
Akron	Receiving		
