= 2026 Temple Owls football team =

American college football season

2026 Temple Owls football
- Conference: American Conference
- Record: 2–9 (1–6 American)
- Head coach: K. C. Keeler (2nd season)
- Offensive coordinator: Tyler Walker (2nd season)
- Offensive scheme: Spread
- Defensive coordinator: Brian Smith (2nd season)
- Base defense: Multiple 3–4
- Home stadium: Lincoln Financial Field

2026 American Conference football standings
	Conf.			Overall
Team	W		L	W		L
UTSA	6	–	1	9	–	2
Memphis	5	–	2	8	–	3
East Carolina	5	–	2	7	–	4
North Texas	5	–	2	7	–	4
UAB	4	–	3	6	–	5
Army	4	–	3	5	–	5
Tulsa	4	–	3	7	–	4
Florida Atlantic	4	–	3	7	–	4
Tulane	4	–	3	6	–	5
Navy	3	–	4	4	–	6
South Florida	2	–	5	6	–	5
Rice	1	–	6	2	–	9
Charlotte	1	–	6	1	–	10
Temple	1	–	6	2	–	9
Championship: December 5, 2026
As of November 22, 2026; Rankings from AP poll

The 2026 Temple Owls football team will represent Temple University as a member of the American Conference during the 2026 NCAA Division I FBS football season. Led by second-year head coach K. C. Keeler, the Owls will play their home games at Lincoln Financial Field in Philadelphia, Pennsylvania.

== Schedule ==
Date	Time	Opponent	Site	TV	Result	Attendance
September 5	2:00 p.m.	No. 6 (FCS) Rhode Island*	Lincoln Financial Field; Philadelphia, PA	ESPN+	W 38–14	13,484
September 12	12:00 p.m.	No. 16 Penn State*	Lincoln Financial Field; Philadelphia, PA	ESPN2	L 9–27	61,714
September 19	3:00 p.m.	at Toledo*	Glass Bowl; Toledo, OH	CBSSN	L 48–49 ^{OT}	19,011
September 25	4:00 p.m.	Army	Lincoln Financial Field; Philadelphia, PA	ESPN	L 17–21	13,449
October 3	7:30 p.m.	at South Florida	Raymond James Stadium; Tampa, FL	ESPNU	W 17–13	36,349
October 10	3:45 p.m.	UConn*	Lincoln Financial Field; Philadelphia, PA	ESPNU	L 20–34	21,112
October 17	1:00 p.m.	Charlotte	Lincoln Financial Field; Philadelphia, PA	ESPN+	L 31–38	11,589
October 31	3:00 p.m.	at East Carolina	Dowdy–Ficklen Stadium; Greenville, NC	ESPN+	L 9–17	30,213
November 7	3:30 p.m.	at Navy	Navy–Marine Corps Memorial Stadium; Annapolis, MD	CBSSN	L 35–42	31,132
November 14	1:00 p.m.	UAB	Lincoln Financial Field; Philadelphia, PA	ESPN+	L 10–36	11,881
November 19	7:30 p.m.	Rice	Lincoln Financial Field; Philadelphia, PA	ESPN	L 27–31	10,411
November 27	3:30 p.m.	at Memphis	Simmons Bank Liberty Stadium; Memphis, TN	ESPN		
*Non-conference game; Rankings from AP Poll - Released prior to game; All times are in Mountain time

== Game summaries ==
=== No. 6 (FCS) Rhode Island ===
No. 6 (FCS) Rhode Island Rams (1–0) at Temple Owls (0–0) – Game summary

Quarter	1	2	3	4	Total
No. 6 (FCS) Rams	7	7	0	0	14
Owls	10	14	7	7	38

at Lincoln Financial Field • Philadelphia, Pennsylvania

- Date: September 5
- Game time: 2:00 p.m. EDT
- Game weather: Cloudy • Temperature: 80 °F (27 °C)
- Game attendance: 13,484
- Referee: Reid Jackson
- TV announcers (ESPN+): Joe Tordy and Jay Sonnhalter

Game information

First quarter

- TEM – Jayce Freeman 18-yard pass from Jaxon Smolik (Carl Hardin kick), 12:29. Owls 7–0. Drive: 5 plays, 75 yards, 2:31.
- URI – Marquis Buchanan 35-yard pass from Tyler Budge (Ty Groff kick), 9:31. Tied 7–7. Drive: 6 plays, 75 yards, 2:58.
- TEM – Carl Hardin 33-yard field goal, 5:28. Owls 10–7. Drive: 8 plays, 59 yards, 4:03.

Second quarter

- TEM – Jamarcus Pierre 35-yard interception return (Carl Hardin kick), 9:20. Owls 17–7.
- URI – Tyler Budge 1-yard run (Ty Groff kick), 2:22. Owls 17–14. Drive: 14 plays, 75 yards, 6:58.
- TEM – Keveun Mason 1-yard run (Carl Hardin kick), 0:16. Owls 24–14. Drive: 7 plays, 75 yards, 2:06.

Third quarter

- TEM – Keveun Mason 3-yard run (Carl Hardin kick), 1:05. Owls 31–14. Drive: 17 plays, 82 yards, 8:16.

Fourth quarter

- TEM – Tyree Alualu 63-yard interception return (Carl Hardin kick), 8:53. Owls 38–14.

Statistics	URI	TEM
First downs	15	19
Plays–yards	61–292	61–369
Rushes–yards	30–97	45–227
Passing yards	195	142
Passing: comp–att–int	18–31–2	9–16–0
Turnovers	3	1
Time of possession	29:06	30:54

Team	Category	Player	Statistics
Rhode Island	Passing	Tyler Budge	18/31, 195 yards, TD, 2 INT
Rhode Island	Rushing	Brendon Barrow	11 carries, 39 yards
Rhode Island	Receiving	Marquis Buchanan	10 receptions, 137 yards, TD
Temple	Passing	Ajani Sheppard	5/10, 85 yards
Temple	Rushing	Keveun Mason	20 carries, 158 yards, 2 TD
Temple	Receiving	Colin Chase	3 receptions, 43 yards

=== No. 16 Penn State ===
No. 16 Penn State Nittany Lions (1–0) at Temple Owls (1–0) – Game summary

Quarter	1	2	3	4	Total
No. 16 Nittany Lions	0	10	10	7	27
Owls	0	3	0	6	9

at Lincoln Financial Field • Philadelphia, Pennsylvania

- Date: September 12
- Game time: 12:00 p.m. EDT
- Game weather: 77 °F (25 °C) • mostly cloudy
- Game attendance: 61,714
- Referee: Bryan Banks
- TV announcers (ESPN2): Anish Shroff, Andre Ware and Morgan Uber

Game information

First quarter

- No scoring plays.

Second quarter

- TEM – Carl Hardin 24-yard field goal, 12:00. Owls 3–0. Drive: 15 plays, 91 yards, 8:11.
- PSU – Ryan Barker 31-yard field goal, 6:51. Tied 3–3. Drive: 10 plays, 62 yards, 5:09.
- PSU – Benjamin Brahmer 23-yard pass from Rocco Becht (Ryan Barker kick), 0:08. Nittany Lions 10–3. Drive: 10 plays, 83 yards, 1:49.

Third quarter

- PSU – Chase Sowell 16-yard pass from Rocco Becht (Ryan Barker kick), 8:25. Nittany Lions 17–3. Drive: 8 plays, 66 yards, 3:21.
- PSU – Ryan Barker 39-yard field goal, 0:08. Nittany Lions 20–3. Drive: 11 plays, 62 yards, 6:08.

Fourth quarter

- PSU – Benjamin Brahmer 23-yard pass from Rocco Becht (Ryan Barker kick), 7:48. Nittany Lions 27–3. Drive: 10 plays, 85 yards, 5:02.
- TEM – Ajani Sheppard 3-yard run (run failed), 1:56. Nittany Lions 27–9. Drive: 12 plays, 75 yards, 7:48.

Statistics	PSU	TEM
First downs	23	14
Plays–yards	61–416	55–283
Rushes–yards	34–148	33–176
Passing yards	268	107
Passing: comp–att–int	21–27–0	13–22–1
Turnovers	0	1
Time of possession	28:49	31:11

Team	Category	Player	Statistics
Penn State	Passing	Rocco Becht	21/27, 268 yards, 3 TD
Penn State	Rushing	Carson Hansen	19 carries, 84 yards
Penn State	Receiving	Benjamin Brahmer	5 receptions, 79 yards, 2 TD
Temple	Passing	Jaxon Smolik	10/16, 59 yards, INT
Temple	Rushing	Keveun Mason	14 carries, 76 yards
Temple	Receiving	Jayce Freeman	1 reception, 39 yards

=== at Toledo ===
Temple Owls (1–1) at Toledo Rockets (1–1) – Game summary

Quarter	1	2	3	4	OT	Total
Owls	10	14	3	15	6	48
Rockets	7	7	7	21	7	49

at Glass Bowl • Toledo, Ohio

- Date: September 19
- Game time: 3:00 p.m. EDT
- Game weather: Cloudy • Temperature: 64 °F (18 °C) • Wind: SE at 9 miles per hour (14 km/h)
- Game attendance: 19,011
- Referee: Kevin Randall
- TV announcers (CBSSN): Jack Gordon (play-by-play) and Taylor McHargue (analyst)

Game information

First quarter

- TEM – Carl Hardin 41-yard field goal, 12:10. Owls 3–0. Drive: 4 plays, 1 yards, 0:55.
- TOL – CJ Miller 1-yard run (Reice Griffith kick), 8:10. Rockets 7–3. Drive: 11 plays, 75 yards, 4:00.
- TEM – Joey Schlaffer 2-yard pass from Ajani Sheppard (Carl Hardin kick), 2:00. Owls 10–7. Drive: 12 plays, 73 yards, 6:05.

Second quarter

- TEM – Samuel Brown 3-yard run (Carl Hardin kick), 6:48. Owls 17–7. Drive: 13 plays, 60 yards, 6:24.
- TOL – Connor Walendzak 2-yard run (Reice Griffith kick), 5:11. Owls 17–14. Drive: 4 plays, 75 yards, 1:37.
- TEM – Samuel Brown 2-yard pass from Ajani Sheppard (Carl Hardin kick), 0:02. Owls 24–14. Drive: 13 plays, 75 yards, 5:09.

Third quarter

- TOL – Jake Newell 9-yard pass from John Alan Richter (Reice Griffith kick), 10:29. Owls 24–21. Drive: 10 plays, 75 yards, 4:31.
- TEM – Carl Hardin 48-yard field goal, 5:09. Owls 27–21. Drive: 8 plays, 45 yards, 5:20.

Fourth quarter

- TOL – Connor Walendzak 9-yard pass from John Alan Richter (Reice Griffith kick), 12:29. Rockets 28–27. Drive: 8 plays, 32 yards, 2:26.
- TEM – Colin Chase 69-yard pass from Ajani Sheppard (Peter Clarke pass), 11:40. Owls 35–28. Drive: 2 plays, 73 yards, 0:41.
- TEM – Samuel Brown 2-yard run (Carl Hardin kick), 6:40. Owls 42–28. Drive: 6 plays, 65 yards, 3:54.
- TOL – CJ Miller 10-yard pass from John Alan Richter (Reice Griffith kick), 1:05. Owls 42–35. Drive: 10 plays, 83 yards, 2:03.
- TOL – Daryl Barnett JR. 23-yard pass from John Alan Richter (Reice Griffith kick), 0:54. Tied 42–42. Drive: 2 plays, 49 yards, 0:09.

Overtime

- TOL – Connor Walendzak 1-yard run (Reice Griffith kick), 0:00. Rockets 49–42. Drive: 2 plays, 25 yards, 0:00.
- TEM – Ajani Sheppard 22-yard run (pass failed), 0:00. Rockets 49–48. Drive: 2 plays, 25 yards, 0:00.

Statistics	TEM	TOL
First downs	21	27
Plays–yards	72–425	76–536
Rushes–yards	49–261	25–107
Passing yards	164	429
Passing: comp–att–int	12–23–0	36–51–0
Turnovers	1	1
Time of possession	33:38	26:22

Team	Category	Player	Statistics
Temple	Passing	Ajani Sheppard	12/22, 164 yards, 3 TD
Temple	Rushing	Samuel Brown V	15 carries, 109 yards, 2 TD
Temple	Receiving	Colin Chase	3 receptions, 77 yards, TD
Toledo	Passing	John Alan Richter	36/51, 429 yards, 4 TD
Toledo	Rushing	Connor Walendzak	12 carries, 62 yards, 2 TD
Toledo	Receiving	Terrell Crosby Jr.	7 receptions, 95 yards

=== Army ===
Army Black Knights (1–1) at Temple Owls (1–2) – Game summary

Quarter	1	2	Total
Black Knights			0
Owls			0

at Lincoln Financial Field • Philadelphia, Pennsylvania

- Date: September 25
- Game time: 4:00 p.m. EDT
- Game attendance: 13,449
- TV announcers (ESPN): Clay Matvick and Rocky Boiman

Statistics	ARMY	TEM
First downs		
Plays–yards		
Rushes–yards		
Passing yards		
Passing: comp–att–int		
Time of possession		

Team	Category	Player	Statistics
Army	Passing		
Army	Rushing		
Army	Receiving		
Temple	Passing		
Temple	Rushing		
Temple	Receiving		

=== at South Florida ===
Temple Owls (1–3) at South Florida Bulls (4–0) – Game summary

Quarter	1	2	Total
Owls			0
Bulls			0

at Raymond James Stadium • Tampa, Florida

- Date: October 3
- Game time: 7:30 p.m. EDT
- Game attendance: 36,349
- TV: ESPNU

Statistics	TEM	USF
First downs		
Plays–yards		
Rushes–yards		
Passing yards		
Passing: comp–att–int		
Time of possession		

Team	Category	Player	Statistics
Temple	Passing		
Temple	Rushing		
Temple	Receiving		
South Florida	Passing		
South Florida	Rushing		
South Florida	Receiving		

=== UConn ===
UConn Huskies (2–3) at Temple Owls (2–3) – Game summary

Quarter	1	2	3	4	Total
Huskies	14	10	0	10	34
Owls	14	3	3	0	20

at Lincoln Financial Field • Philadelphia, Pennsylvania

- Date: October 10
- Game time: 3:45 p.m. EDT
- Game weather: Sunny • Temperature: 73 °F (23 °C) • Wind: SE at 6 miles per hour (9.7 km/h)
- Game attendance: 21,112
- Referee: Edwin Lee
- TV announcers (ESPNU): Ted Emrich & Fozzy Whittaker

Game information

First quarter

- CONN - Osborne, Kalieb 12 yd run (O'Connor, Jack kick), 12:43. Huskies 7–0. Drive: 6 plays, 75 yards, TOP 02:17
- TEM - Bermudez, Jojo 79 yd pass from Sheppard, Ajani (Hardin, Carl kick), 12:28. Tied 7–7. Drive: 1 plays, 79 yards, TOP 00:10
- CONN - Christian, Kenji 39 yd run (O'Connor, Jack kick), 10:18. Huskies 14–7. Drive: 5 plays, 75 yards, TOP 02:10
- TEM - Clarke, Peter 29 yd pass from Chase, Colin (Hardin, Carl kick), 4:43. Tied 14–14. Drive: 10 plays, 80 yards, TOP 05:31

Second quarter

- TEM - Hardin, Carl 26 yd field goal, 8:13. Owls 17–14. Drive: 12 plays, 82 yards, TOP 07:02
- CONN - Cornist, Trey 1 yd run (O'Connor, Jack kick), 5:55. Huskies 21–17. Drive: 5 plays, 75 yards, TOP 02:18
- CONN - O'Connor, Jack 21 yd field goal, 0:00. Huskies 24–17. Drive: 9 plays, 75 yards, TOP 01:52

Third quarter

- TEM - Hardin, Carl 29 yd field goal, 2:42. Huskies 24–20. Drive: 9 plays, 61 yards, TOP 04:17

Fourth quarter

- CONN - Bowers, Cyncir 8 yd run (O'Connor, Jack kick), 7:52. Huskies 31–20. Drive: 10 plays, 62 yards, TOP 04:16
- CONN - O'Connor, Jack 27 yd field goal, 1:05. Huskies 34–20. Drive: 10 plays, 48 yards, TOP 05:19

Statistics	CONN	TEM
First downs	23	21
Plays–yards	63–505	60–437
Rushes–yards	39–248	34–148
Passing yards	257	289
Passing: comp–att–int	17–24–0	20–26–0
Time of possession	28:58	31:02

Team	Category	Player	Statistics
UConn	Passing	Kalieb Osborne	17/23, 257 yards
UConn	Rushing	Trey Cornist	7 carries, 114 yards, TD
UConn	Receiving	Ryder Treadway	3 receptions, 63 yards
Temple	Passing	Ajani Sheppard	19/25, 260 yards, TD
Temple	Rushing	Keveun Mason	13 carries, 88 yards
Temple	Receiving	Jojo Bermudez	2 receptions, 96 yards, TD

=== Charlotte ===
Charlotte 49ers (0–6) at Temple Owls (2–4) – Game summary

Quarter	1	2	Total
49ers			0
Owls			0

at Lincoln Financial Field • Philadelphia, Pennsylvania

- Date: October 17
- Game time: 1:00 p.m. EDT
- TV: ESPN+

Statistics	CLT	TEM
First downs		
Plays–yards		
Rushes–yards		
Passing yards		
Passing: comp–att–int		
Time of possession		

Team	Category	Player	Statistics
Charlotte	Passing		
Charlotte	Rushing		
Charlotte	Receiving		
Temple	Passing		
Temple	Rushing		
Temple	Receiving		

=== at East Carolina ===
Temple Owls (2–5) at East Carolina Pirates (3–4) – Game summary

Quarter	1	2	Total
Owls			0
Pirates			0

at Dowdy–Ficklen Stadium • Greenville, North Carolina

- Date: October 31
- Game time: TBD

Statistics	TEM	ECU
First downs		
Plays–yards		
Rushes–yards		
Passing yards		
Passing: comp–att–int		
Time of possession		

Team	Category	Player	Statistics
Temple	Passing		
Temple	Rushing		
Temple	Receiving		
East Carolina	Passing		
East Carolina	Rushing		
East Carolina	Receiving		

=== at Navy ===
Temple Owls (2–6) at Navy Midshipmen (2–6) – Game summary

Quarter	1	2	Total
Owls			0
Midshipmen			0

at Navy–Marine Corps Memorial Stadium • Annapolis, Maryland

- Date: November 7
- Game time: 3:30 p.m. EST
- TV: CBSSN

Statistics	TEM	NAVY
First downs		
Plays–yards		
Rushes–yards		
Passing yards		
Passing: comp–att–int		
Time of possession		

Team	Category	Player	Statistics
Temple	Passing		
Temple	Rushing		
Temple	Receiving		
Navy	Passing		
Navy	Rushing		
Navy	Receiving		

=== UAB ===
UAB Blazers (5–4) at Temple Owls (2–7) – Game summary

Quarter	1	2	Total
Blazers			0
Owls			0

at Lincoln Financial Field • Philadelphia, Pennsylvania

- Date: November 14
- Game time: TBD

Statistics	UAB	TEM
First downs		
Plays–yards		
Rushes–yards		
Passing yards		
Passing: comp–att–int		
Time of possession		

Team	Category	Player	Statistics
UAB	Passing		
UAB	Rushing		
UAB	Receiving		
Temple	Passing		
Temple	Rushing		
Temple	Receiving		

=== Rice ===
Rice Owls (1–9) at Temple Owls (2–8) – Game summary

Quarter	1	2	Total
Rice			0
Temple			0

at Lincoln Financial Field • Philadelphia, Pennsylvania

- Date: November 19
- Game time: 7:30 p.m. EST
- TV: ESPN

Statistics	RICE	TEM
First downs		
Plays–yards		
Rushes–yards		
Passing yards		
Passing: comp–att–int		
Time of possession		

Team	Category	Player	Statistics
Rice	Passing		
Rice	Rushing		
Rice	Receiving		
Temple	Passing		
Temple	Rushing		
Temple	Receiving		

=== at Memphis ===
Temple Owls (2–9) at Memphis Tigers (8–3) – Game summary

Quarter	1	2	Total
Owls			0
Tigers			0

at Simmons Bank Liberty Stadium • Memphis, Tennessee

- Date: November 28
- Game time: TBD

Statistics	TEM	MEM
First downs		
Plays–yards		
Rushes–yards		
Passing yards		
Passing: comp–att–int		
Time of possession		

Team	Category	Player	Statistics
Temple	Passing		
Temple	Rushing		
Temple	Receiving		
Memphis	Passing		
Memphis	Rushing		
Memphis	Receiving		
