= 2026 Akron Zips football team =

American college football season

2026 Akron Zips football
- Conference: Mid-American Conference
- Record: 2–9 (1–6 MAC)
- Head coach: Joe Moorhead (5th season)
- Offensive scheme: Up-tempo spread
- Defensive coordinator: Tim Tibesar (5th season)
- Base defense: Multiple 4–2–5
- Home stadium: InfoCision Stadium–Summa Field

2026 Mid-American Conference football standings
	Conf.			Overall
Team	W		L	W		L
Ohio	6	–	1	8	–	3
Western Michigan	6	–	1	8	–	3
Buffalo	6	–	1	8	–	3
Toledo	5	–	1	8	–	2
Miami (OH)	5	–	2	7	–	4
Bowling Green	3	–	3	3	–	7
Central Michigan	3	–	4	5	–	6
Eastern Michigan	3	–	4	4	–	7
UMass	2	–	5	5	–	6
Kent State	2	–	5	3	–	8
Ball State	2	–	5	3	–	8
Akron	1	–	6	2	–	9
Sacramento State	1	–	7	2	–	9
Championship: December 5, 2026
As of November 19, 2026; Rankings from AP poll

The 2026 Akron Zips football team is who represents the University of Akron in the Mid-American Conference during the 2026 NCAA Division I FBS football season. The Zips are led by Joe Moorhead in his fifth year as the head coach. The Zips play their home games at InfoCision Stadium, located in Akron, Ohio.

== Schedule ==
Date	Time	Opponent	Site	TV	Result	Attendance
September 3	7:00 p.m.	at Wake Forest*	Allegacy Federal Credit Union Stadium; Winston-Salem, NC	ACCN	L 16–38	30,735
September 12	3:30 p.m.	Robert Morris*	InfoCision Stadium; Akron, OH	ESPN+	W 45–10	10,032
September 19	12:00 p.m.	at Minnesota*	Huntington Bank Stadium; Minneapolis, MN	BTN	L 7–41	40,168
September 26	12:00 p.m.	UNLV*	InfoCision Stadium; Akron, OH	ESPN+	L 10–38	5,607
October 3	3:30 p.m.	at Central Michigan	Kelly/Shorts Stadium; Mount Pleasant, MI	ESPN+	L 17–41	20,102
October 10	3:30 p.m.	Eastern Michigan^{†}	InfoCision Stadium; Akron, OH	ESPN+	L 23–25	9,038
October 17	3:30 p.m.	at Miami (OH)	Yager Stadium; Oxford, OH	ESPN+	L 14–34	18,515
October 24	1:00 p.m.	at Kent State	Dix Stadium; Kent, OH (Wagon Wheel)	ESPN+	L 20–35	12,375
November 3	7:00 p.m.	Ohio	InfoCision Stadium; Akron, OH	ESPN2	L 20–28	5,479
November 10	7:00 p.m.	Western Michigan	InfoCision Stadium; Akron, OH	CBSSN	L 14–42	4,243
November 18	7:00 p.m.	at UMass	McGuirk Alumni Stadium; Hadley, MA	CBSSN	W 34–33	6,698
November 27	12:00 p.m.	Buffalo	InfoCision Stadium; Akron, OH			
*Non-conference game; ^{†}Homecoming; All times are in Eastern time

== Game summaries ==
=== at Wake Forest ===
Akron Zips (0–0) at Wake Forest Demon Deacons (0–0) – Game summary

Quarter	1	2	3	4	Total
Zips	0	3	0	13	16
Demon Deacons	10	18	3	7	38

at Allegacy Federal Credit Union Stadium • Winston-Salem, North Carolina

- Date: September 3
- Game time: 7:00 p.m. EDT
- Game weather: Sunny
- Game attendance: 30,735
- Referee: Jerry Magallanes
- TV announcers (ACCN): Matt Schick, Forrest Conoly and Ashley Stroehlein

Game information

First quarter

- WAKE – Kam Shanks 27-yard pass from Gio Lopez (Connor Calvert kick), 11:32. Demon Deacons 7–0. Drive: 8 plays, 82 yards, 3:23.
- WAKE – Connor Calvert 25-yard field goal, 2:44. Demon Deacons 10–0. Drive: 14 plays, 57 yards, 6:13.

Second quarter

- WAKE – Antonio Meeks 72-yard pass from Gio Lopez (Connor Calvert kick), 11:39. Demon Deacons 17–0. Drive: 4 plays, 88 yards, 1:38.
- WAKE – Connor Calvert 29-yard field goal, 6:53. Demon Deacons 20–0. Drive: 8 plays, 32 yards, 3:47.
- WAKE – Carlos Hernandez 78-yard pass from Gio Lopez (Steele Pizzella–Will Loerzel pass), 4:57. Demon Deacons 28–0. Drive: 1 play, 78 yards, 0:13.
- AKR – Matthew Schramm 28-yard field goal, 1:35. Demon Deacons 28–3. Drive: 10 plays, 65 yards, 3:22.

Third quarter

- WAKE – Connor Calvert 26-yard field goal, 10:16. Demon Deacons 31–3. Drive: 6 plays, 61 yards, 2:17.

Fourth quarter

- WAKE – Deuce Lawrence 4-yard run (Connor Calvert kick), 11:49. Demon Deacons 38–3. Drive: 11 plays, 46 yards, 5:07.
- AKR – Elijah Alexander 2-yard pass from Brayden Roggow (Aidan Stire kick), 7:06. Demon Deacons 38–10. Drive: 10 plays, 75 yards, 4:43.
- AKR – Titus Myers 4-yard pass from Brayden Roggow (Aidan Stire kick failed), 0:29. Demon Deacons 38–16. Drive: 11 plays, 79 yards, 4:17.

Statistics	AKR	WAKE
First downs	20	20
Plays–yards	69–305	68–559
Rushes–yards	36–149	33–203
Passing yards	156	356
Passing: comp–att–int	28–33–0	22–35–0
Turnovers	1	0
Time of possession	30:36	29:24

Team	Category	Player	Statistics
Akron	Passing	Cibastian Broughton	21/26, 111 yards
Akron	Rushing	Cibastian Broughton	14 carries, 82 yards
Akron	Receiving	Marcel Williams	4 receptions, 38 yards
Wake Forest	Passing	Gio Lopez	21/32, 350 yards, 3 TD
Wake Forest	Rushing	Ty Clark III	7 carries, 105 yards
Wake Forest	Receiving	Carlos Hernandez	5 receptions, 165 yards, TD

=== Robert Morris (FCS) ===
Robert Morris Colonials (FCS) (2–0) at Akron Zips (0–1) – Game summary

Quarter	1	2	3	4	Total
Colonials (FCS)	0	10	0	0	10
Zips	7	14	10	14	45

at InfoCision Stadium • Akron, Ohio

- Date: September 12
- Game time: 3:30 p.m. EDT
- Game weather: Rain • Temperature: 74 °F (23 °C) • Wind: S at 8 miles per hour (13 km/h)
- Game attendance: 10,032
- Referee: Jason Berg
- TV announcers (ESPN+): Anthony Lima and Ryan Cavanaugh

Game information

First quarter

- AKR – Sean Patrick 41-yard pass from Cibastian Broughton (Matthew Schramm kick), 3:52. Zips 7–0. Drive: 9 plays, 82 yards, 4:39.

Second quarter

- RMU – Galen Combs 43-yard pass from Carson Haggard (Lucca Valens kick), 14:51. Tied 7–7. Drive: 8 plays, 70 yards, 4:01.
- AKR – Elijah Alexander 25-yard pass from Cibastian Broughton (Matthew Schramm kick), 13:19. Zips 14–7. Drive: 3 plays, 40 yards, 1:20.
- AKR – Miles Burris 6-yard pass from Cibastian Broughton (Matthew Schramm kick), 5:45. Zips 21–7. Drive: 10 plays, 62 yards, 5:42.
- RMU – Lucca Valens 22-yard field goal, 0:00. Zips 21–10. Drive: 7 plays, 56 yards, 0:51.

Third quarter

- AKR – Matthew Schramm 38-yard field goal, 8:55. Zips 24–10. Drive: 6 plays, 22 yards, 2:31.
- AKR – Jordan Gant 1-yard run (Matthew Schramm kick), 5:21. Zips 31–10. Drive: 4 plays, 29 yards, 1:07.

Fourth quarter

- AKR – Elijah Alexander 3-yard pass from Cibastian Broughton (Matthew Schramm kick), 11:45. Zips 38–10. Drive: 10 plays, 86 yards, 5:42.
- AKR – Brayden Roggow 15-yard run (Aidan Stire kick), 3:27. Zips 45–10. Drive: 11 plays, 80 yards, 5:13.

Statistics	RMU	AKR
First downs	12	28
Plays–yards	49–194	72–523
Rushes–yards	19–14	39–241
Passing yards	180	282
Passing: comp–att–int	20–30–0	28–33–0
Turnovers	2	1
Time of possession	24:46	35:14

Team	Category	Player	Statistics
Robert Morris	Passing	Carson Haggard	19/28, 179 yards, TD
Robert Morris	Rushing	Keino Fitzpatrick II	10 carries, 11 yards
Robert Morris	Receiving	Galen Combs	9 receptions, 119 yards, TD
Akron	Passing	Cibastian Broughton	23/27, 227 yards, 4 TD
Akron	Rushing	Jordan Gant	12 carries, 81 yards, TD
Akron	Receiving	Sean Patrick	4 receptions, 65 yards, TD

=== at Minnesota ===
Akron Zips (1–1) at Minnesota Golden Gophers (1–1) – Game summary

Quarter	1	2	3	4	Total
Zips	0	0	0	7	7
Golden Gophers	10	10	7	14	41

at Huntington Bank Stadium • Minneapolis, Minnesota

- Date: September 19
- Game time: 12:00 p.m. EDT
- Game weather: Cloudy • Temperature: 60 °F (16 °C) • Wind: NE at 7 miles per hour (11 km/h)
- Game attendance: 40,168
- Referee: Mark Kluczynski
- TV announcers (BTN): Joe Beninati, Tanner Morgan and Anna Connelly

Statistics	AKR	MINN
First downs	16	20
Plays–yards	60–221	64–395
Rushes–yards	21–48	33–191
Passing yards	173	204
Passing: comp–att–int	21–39–0	17–31–1
Turnovers	2	1
Time of possession	25:56	34:04

Team	Category	Player	Statistics
Akron	Passing	Brayden Roggow	12/25, 131 yards
Akron	Rushing	Cibastian Broughton	3 carries, 17 yards
Akron	Receiving	Gentz Hillburn	3 receptions, 49 yards
Minnesota	Passing	Drake Lindsey	17/31, 204 yards, 3 TD, INT
Minnesota	Rushing	TJ Thomas	13 carries, 122 yards, TD
Minnesota	Receiving	Javon Tracy	5 receptions, 91 yards

=== UNLV ===
UNLV Rebels (1–2) at Akron Zips (1–2) – Game summary

Quarter	1	2	3	4	Total
Rebels	0	0	0	0	0
Zips	0	0	0	0	0

at InfoCision Stadium • Akron, Ohio

- Date: September 26
- Game time: 12:00 p.m. EDT
- Game attendance: 5,607
- TV announcers (ESPN+): Anthony Lima and Patrick Murray

Statistics	UNLV	AKR
First downs		
Plays–yards		
Rushes–yards		
Passing yards		
Passing: comp–att–int		
Time of possession		

Team	Category	Player	Statistics
UNLV	Passing		
UNLV	Rushing		
UNLV	Receiving		
Akron	Passing		
Akron	Rushing		
Akron	Receiving		

=== at Central Michigan ===
Akron Zips (1–3) at Central Michigan Chippewas (2–2) – Game summary

Quarter	1	2	3	4	Total
Zips	0	7	3	7	17
Chippewas	0	21	14	6	41

at Kelly/Shorts Stadium • Mount Pleasant, Michigan

- Date: October 3
- Game time: 3:30 p.m. EDT
- Game weather: Sunny • Temperature: 62 °F (17 °C) • Wind: W at 3 miles per hour (4.8 km/h)
- Game attendance: 20,102
- Referee: Billy Williams
- TV announcers (ESPN+): Evan Stockton (play-by-play) and Barrett Brooks (analyst)

Game information

First quarter

- No scoring

Second quarter

- AKR – Jordan Gant 9-yard run (Matthew Schramm kick), 13:59 (AKR 7–0)
- CMU – Angel Flores 55-yard run (Caden VanHuis kick), 10:37 (Tied 7–7)
- CMU – Shawn Foster 48-yard pass from Angel Flores (Caden VanHuis kick), 7:32 (CMU 14–7)
- CMU – Brock Townsend 5-yard run (Caden VanHuis kick), 0:18 (CMU 21–7)

Third quarter

- CMU – Nick Woodford 27-yard run (Caden VanHuis kick), 11:34 (CMU 28–7)
- AKR – Matthew Schramm 29-yard field goal, 7:43 (CMU 28–10)
- CMU – Jayden Clerveaux 23-yard run (Caden VanHuis kick), 3:35 (CMU 35–10)

Fourth quarter

- CMU – Langston Lewis 71-yard pass from Jadyn Glasser (Caden VanHuis kick failed), 5:32 (CMU 41–10)
- AKR – Brandon Hills 8-yard pass from Brayden Roggow (Matthew Schramm kick), 0:33 (CMU 41–17)

Statistics	AKR	CMU
First downs	20	20
Plays–yards	68–340	62–481
Rushes–yards	36–160	45–332
Passing yards	180	149
Passing: comp–att–int	15–32–3	8–17–0
Turnovers	3	1
Time of possession	30:40	29:20

Team	Category	Player	Statistics
Akron	Passing	Brayden Roggow	15/32, 180 yards, TD, 3 INT
Akron	Rushing	Jordan Gant	17 carries, 102 yards, TD
Akron	Receiving	Marcel Williams	2 receptions, 36 yards
Central Michigan	Passing	Angel Flores	7/14, 78 yards, TD
Central Michigan	Rushing	Angel Flores	18 carries, 154 yards, TD
Central Michigan	Receiving	Langston Lewis	1 reception, 71 yards, TD

=== Eastern Michigan ===
Eastern Michigan Eagles (3–3) at Akron Zips (1–4) – Game summary

Quarter	1	2	3	4	Total
Eagles	0	0	0	0	0
Zips	0	0	0	0	0

at InfoCision Stadium • Akron, Ohio

- Date: October 10
- Game time: 3:30 p.m. EDT
- Game attendance: 9,038
- TV: ESPN+

Game information

First quarter
Second quarter
Third quarter
Fourth quarter

Statistics	EMU	AKR
First downs		
Plays–yards		
Rushes–yards		
Passing yards		
Passing: comp–att–int		
Turnovers		
Time of possession		

Team	Category	Player	Statistics
Eastern Michigan	Passing		
Eastern Michigan	Rushing		
Eastern Michigan	Receiving		
Akron	Passing		
Akron	Rushing		
Akron	Receiving		

=== at Miami (OH) ===
Akron Zips (1–5) at Miami RedHawks (3–3) – Game summary

Quarter	1	2	3	4	Total
Zips	0	0	0	0	0
RedHawks	0	0	0	0	0

at Yager Stadium • Oxford, Ohio

- Date: October 17
- Game time: 3:30 p.m. EDT
- Game attendance: 18,515
- TV: ESPN+

Statistics	AKR	M-OH
First downs		
Plays–yards		
Rushes–yards		
Passing yards		
Passing: comp–att–int		
Turnovers		
Time of possession		

Team	Category	Player	Statistics
Akron	Passing		
Akron	Rushing		
Akron	Receiving		
Miami (OH)	Passing		
Miami (OH)	Rushing		
Miami (OH)	Receiving		

=== at Kent State (Wagon Wheel) ===
Akron Zips (1–6) at Kent State Golden Flashes (2–5) – Game summary

Quarter	1	2	3	4	Total
Zips	0	0	0	0	0
Golden Flashes	0	0	0	0	0

at Dix Stadium • Kent, Ohio

- Date: October 24
- Game time: 1:00 p.m. EDT
- TV: ESPN+

Game information

First quarter
Second quarter
Third quarter
Fourth quarter

Statistics	AKR	KENT
First downs		
Plays–yards		
Rushes–yards		
Passing yards		
Passing: comp–att–int		
Turnovers		
Time of possession		

Team	Category	Player	Statistics
Akron	Passing		
Akron	Rushing		
Akron	Receiving		
Kent State	Passing		
Kent State	Rushing		
Kent State	Receiving		

=== Ohio ===
Ohio Bobcats (6–2) at Akron Zips (1–7) – Game summary

Quarter	1	2	3	4	Total
Bobcats	7	0	7	14	28
Zips	3	3	3	11	20

at InfoCision Stadium • Akron, Ohio

- Date: November 3
- Game time: 7:00 p.m. EDT
- Game weather: clear, Temperature:63 °F (17 °C), Wind: S 6 mph (9.7 km/h)
- Game attendance: 5,479
- Referee: Billy Williams
- TV announcers (ESPN2): Eric Rothman (play-by-play) and Dustin Fox (analyst)

Game information

First quarter

- (03:35) AKR - Aidan Stire 42-yard field goal (Drive: 10 plays, 48 yards, 4:44, Akron 3–0)
- (00:09) OHIO – DJ Walker 45-yard interception return (Brack Peacock kick) (Ohio 7–3)

Second quarter

- (03:28) AKR - Aidan Stire 47-yard field goal (Drive: 10 plays, 57 yards, 5:08, Ohio 7–6)

Third quarter

- (09:32) AKR - Aidan Stire 24-yard field goal (Drive: 8 plays, 26 yards, 3:46, Akron 9–7)
- (04:22) OHIO - Nick Poulos 5-yard run (Brack Peacock kick) (Drive: 9 plays, 75 yards, 5:10, Ohio 14–9)

Fourth quarter

- (09:35) AKR - Jordan Gant 1-yard run (Marcel Williams pass from Cibastian Broughton) (Drive: 12 plays, 77 yards, 6:06, Akron 17–14)
- (09:22) OHIO - Dom Dorwart 60-yard pass from Nick Poulos (Brack Peacock kick) (Drive: 1 plays, 60 yards, 0:13, Ohio 21–17)
- (03:57) OHIO - Duncan Brune 91-yard run (Brack Peacock kick) (Drive: 1 plays, 91 yards, 0:14, Ohio 28–17)
- (01:56) AKR - Aidan Stire 43-yard field goal (Drive: 9 plays, 38 yards, 1:51, Ohio 28–20)

Statistics	OHIO	AKR
First downs	12	26
Total yards	46–358	79–392
Rushing yards	26–161	44–160
Passing yards	197	232
Passing: Comp–Att–Int	12–20–0	22–35–1
Time of possession	24:14	35:46

Team	Category	Player	Statistics
Ohio	Passing	Nick Poulos	12/20, 197 yards, TD
Ohio	Rushing	Duncan Brune	10 carries, 111 yards, TD
Ohio	Receiving	Dom Dorwart	4 receptions, 108 yards, TD
Akron	Passing	Cibastian Broughton	22/34, 232 yards, INT
Akron	Rushing	Jordan Gant	16 carries, 112 yards, TD
Akron	Receiving	Kyan Mason	6 receptions, 71 yards

=== Western Michigan ===
Western Michigan Broncos (6–3) at Akron Zips (1–8) – Game summary

Quarter	1	2	3	4	Total
Broncos	0	0	0	0	0
Zips	0	0	0	0	0

at InfoCision Stadium • Akron, Ohio

- Date: November 10
- Game time: 7:00 p.m. EDT

Game information

First quarter
Second quarter
Third quarter
Fourth quarter

Statistics	WMU	AKR
First downs		
Plays–yards		
Rushes–yards		
Passing yards		
Passing: comp–att–int		
Turnovers		
Time of possession		

Team	Category	Player	Statistics
Western Michigan	Passing		
Western Michigan	Rushing		
Western Michigan	Receiving		
Akron	Passing		
Akron	Rushing		
Akron	Receiving		

=== at UMass ===
Akron Zips (1–9) at UMass Minutemen (5–5) – Game summary

Quarter	1	2	3	4	Total
Zips	0	0	0	0	0
Minutemen	0	0	0	0	0

at Warren McGuirk Alumni Stadium • Hadley, Massachusetts

- Date: November 18

Statistics	AKR	MASS
First downs		
Total yards		
Rushing yards		
Passing yards		
Passing: Comp–Att–Int		
Turnovers		
Time of possession		

Team	Category	Player	Statistics
Akron	Passing		
Akron	Rushing		
Akron	Receiving		
UMass	Passing		
UMass	Rushing		
UMass	Receiving		

=== Buffalo ===
Buffalo Bulls (8–3) at Akron Zips (2–9) – Game summary

Quarter	1	2	3	4	Total
Bulls	0	0	0	0	0
Zips	0	0	0	0	0

at InfoCision Stadium • Akron, Ohio

- Date: November 27
- Game time: 12:00 p.m. EDT

Game information

First quarter
Second quarter
Third quarter
Fourth quarter

Statistics	BUFF	AKR
First downs		
Plays–yards		
Rushes–yards		
Passing yards		
Passing: comp–att–int		
Turnovers		
Time of possession		

Team	Category	Player	Statistics
Buffalo	Passing		
Buffalo	Rushing		
Buffalo	Receiving		
Akron	Passing		
Akron	Rushing		
Akron	Receiving		
