= 2026 Kent State Golden Flashes football team =

American college football season

2026 Kent State Golden Flashes football
- Conference: Mid-American Conference
- Record: 3–8 (2–5 MAC)
- Head coach: Mark Carney (2nd season)
- Offensive coordinator: Clay Patterson (3rd season)
- Offensive scheme: Spread
- Defensive coordinator: Cherokee Valeria (2nd season)
- Base defense: Multiple 3–4
- Home stadium: Dix Stadium

2026 Mid-American Conference football standings
	Conf.			Overall
Team	W		L	W		L
Ohio	6	–	1	8	–	3
Western Michigan	6	–	1	8	–	3
Buffalo	6	–	1	8	–	3
Toledo	5	–	1	8	–	2
Miami (OH)	5	–	2	7	–	4
Bowling Green	3	–	3	3	–	7
Central Michigan	3	–	4	5	–	6
Eastern Michigan	3	–	4	4	–	7
UMass	2	–	5	5	–	6
Kent State	2	–	5	3	–	8
Ball State	2	–	5	3	–	8
Akron	1	–	6	2	–	9
Sacramento State	1	–	7	2	–	9
Championship: December 5, 2026
As of November 19, 2026; Rankings from AP poll

The 2026 Kent State Golden Flashes football team represents Kent State University in the Mid-American Conference for the upcoming 2026 NCAA Division I FBS football season. The Golden Flashes are led by head coach Mark Carney; Carney spent most of the 2025 season as interim head coach with the interim tag being removed late in the 2025 season. The Golden Flashes play home games at Dix Stadium, located in Kent, Ohio.

Kent State will face Wofford, South Florida, and Sacramento State for the first time in program history.

After a turnaround season in 2025 (improving to five wins after zero wins in 2024), Kent State had a strong 2026 recruiting class, including defensive back Lennox Lemon, who was rated at the sixth-best prospect in Ohio.

== Schedule ==
Date	Time	Opponent	Site	TV	Result	Attendance
September 5	12:45 p.m.	at South Carolina*	Williams–Brice Stadium; Columbia, SC	SECN	L 0–57	77,559
September 12	12:00 p.m.	Wofford*	Dix Stadium; Kent, OH	ESPN+	W 36–15	7,887
September 19	12:00 p.m.	at No. 6 Ohio State*	Ohio Stadium; Columbus, OH	FOX	L 3–59	100,009
September 26	12:00 p.m.	Ball State	Dix Stadium; Kent, OH	ESPN+	W 26–13	11,059
October 3	3:30 p.m.	Ohio^{†}	Dix Stadium; Kent, OH	ESPN+	L 10–13	13,022
October 10	3:30 p.m.	at Western Michigan	Waldo Stadium; Kalamazoo, MI	ESPN+	L 7–38	20,868
October 17	7:00 p.m.	at South Florida*	Raymond James Stadium; Tampa, FL	ESPN+	L 2–29	31,384
October 24	1:00 p.m.	Akron	Dix Stadium; Kent, OH (Wagon Wheel)	ESPN+	W 35–20	12,375
October 30	10:30 p.m.	at Sacramento State	Hornet Stadium; Sacramento, CA	ESPN2	L 10–31	9,931
November 10	7:00 p.m.	at Bowling Green	Doyt Perry Stadium; Bowling Green, OH (Anniversary Award)	ESPNU	L 28–33	10,254
November 17	7:00 p.m.	Miami (OH)	Dix Stadium; Kent, OH	ESPNU	L 3–20	8,185
November 24	7:00 p.m.	at Eastern Michigan	Rynearson Stadium; Ypsilanti, MI	ESPN+		
*Non-conference game; ^{†}Homecoming; Rankings from Coaches' Poll released prior to the game

== Game summaries ==
=== at South Carolina ===
Kent State Golden Flashes (0–0) at South Carolina Gamecocks (0–0) – Game summary

Quarter	1	2	3	4	Total
Golden Flashes	0	0	0	0	0
Gamecocks	7	22	14	14	57

at Williams–Brice Stadium • Columbia, South Carolina

- Date: September 5
- Game time: 12:45 PM EDT
- Game weather: Sunny, 95 °F (35 °C)
- Game attendance: 77,559
- Referee: Steve Marlowe
- TV announcers (SECN): Taylor Zarzour, Matt Stinchcomb and Michella Chester

Game information

First quarter

- SC – Matt Fuller 7-yard run (Max Kelley kick), 4:18. Gamecocks 7–0. Drive: 7 plays, 87 yards, 2:42.

Second quarter

- SC – Mazeo Bennett Jr. 18-yard pass from LaNorris Sellers (Maurice Brown II pass to Brady Hunt), 12:41. Gamecocks 15–0. Drive: 8 plays, 85 yards, 3:01.
- SC – Jabree Coleman 60-yard run (Max Kelley kick), 6:25. Gamecocks 22–0. Drive: 6 plays, 92 yards, 1:56.
- SC – Donovan Murph 29-yard pass from LaNorris Sellers (Max Kelley kick), 1:10. Gamecocks 29–0. Drive: 7 plays, 87 yards, 2:19.

Third quarter

- SC – Donovan Murph 37-yard pass from LaNorris Sellers (Malik Orsan kick), 13:21. Gamecocks 36–0. Drive: 6 plays, 75 yards, 1:39.
- SC – Mike Tyler 7-yard pass from Cutter Woods (Malik Orsan kick), 6:20. Gamecocks 43–0. Drive: 11 plays, 72 yards, 4:20.

Fourth quarter

- SC – Isaiah Augustave 1-yard run (Malik Orsan kick), 9:12. Gamecocks 50–0. Drive: 11 plays, 86 yards, 10:11.
- SC – Jabree Coleman 5-yard run (Malik Orsan kick), 2:26. Gamecocks 57–0. Drive: 8 plays, 61 yards, 5:19.

Statistics	KENT	SC
First downs	10	35
Plays–yards	48–179	72–645
Rushes–yards	25–100	39–278
Passing yards	79	367
Passing: comp–att–int	14–23–1	27–33–0
Turnovers	1	0
Time of possession	25:13	34:47

Team	Category	Player	Statistics
Kent State	Passing	Dru DeShields	12/20, 63 yards
Kent State	Rushing	Dru DeShields	3 carries, 27 yards
Kent State	Receiving	Mason King	2 receptions, 21 yards
South Carolina	Passing	LaNorris Sellers	19/23, 270 yards, 3 TD
South Carolina	Rushing	Jabree Coleman	4 carries, 77 yards, 2 TD
South Carolina	Receiving	Donovan Murph	4 receptions, 92 yards, 2 TD

=== vs Wofford (FCS) ===
Wofford Terriers (FCS) (2–0) at Kent State Golden Flashes (0–1) – Game summary

Quarter	1	2	3	4	Total
Terriers (FCS)	3	12	0	0	15
Golden Flashes	7	7	0	22	36

at Dix Stadium • Kent, Ohio

- Date: September 12
- Game time: 12:00 PM EDT
- Game weather: Rain • Temperature: 74 °F (23 °C) • Wind: SW 5 MPH
- Game attendance: 7,887
- Referee: Rick Warne
- TV announcers (ESPN+): Michael Reghi and Patrick Murray

Game information

First quarter

- KENT – Dru DeShields 12-yard run (Sean Leonard kick), 10:23. Golden Flashes 7–0. Drive: 9 plays, 83 yards, 4:32.
- WOF – Sam Spence 28-yard field goal, 3:20. Golden Flashes 7–3. Drive: 6 plays, 14 yards, 1:30.

Second quarter

- WOF – Gerald Modest Jr. 10-yard run (Sam Spence kick), 9:29. Terriers 10–7. Drive: 5 plays, 36 yards, 1:56.
- WOF – Team safety, 3:04. Terriers 12–7.
- KENT – Rafael Terrero Jr. 63-yard interception return (Sean Leonard kick), 1:50. Golden Flashes 14–12.
- WOF – Sam Spence 50-yard field goal, 0:02. Terriers 15–14. Drive: 7 plays, 44 yards, 1:50.

Third quarter

- No scoring plays.

Fourth quarter

- KENT – Jakorion Caffey 5-yard run (Dru DeShields–Wayne Harris pass), 14:21. Golden Flashes 22–15. Drive: 6 plays, 85 yards, 2:39.
- KENT – Dru DeShields 20-yard run (Sean Leonard kick), 8:27. Golden Flashes 29–15. Drive: 7 plays, 68 yards, 4:15.
- KENT – Wayne Harris 10-yard pass from Dru DeShields (Sean Leonard kick), 4:16. Golden Flashes 36–15. Drive: 5 plays, 57 yards, 2:57.

Statistics	WOF	KENT
First downs	10	21
Plays–yards	54–173	72–253
Rushes–yards	26–58	44–195
Passing yards	115	253
Passing: comp–att–int	13–27–2	17–28–2
Turnovers	2	3
Time of possession	22:38	37:22

Team	Category	Player	Statistics
Wofford	Passing	Ethan Drumm	9/16, 100 yards, 2 INT
Wofford	Rushing	Gerald Modest Jr.	14 carries, 56 yards, TD
Wofford	Receiving	Isaiah Scott	3 receptions, 47 yards
Kent State	Passing	Dru DeShields	16/25, 248 yards, TD, 2 INT
Kent State	Rushing	Dru DeShields	10 carries, 74 yards, 2 TD
Kent State	Receiving	Darealyst Clark	5 receptions, 90 yards

=== at No. 6 Ohio State ===
Kent State Golden Flashes (1–1) at No. 6 Ohio State Buckeyes (1–1) – Game summary

Quarter	1	2	3	4	Total
Golden Flashes	0	0	0	3	3
No. 6 Buckeyes	21	14	7	17	59

at Ohio Stadium • Columbus, Ohio

- Date: September 19
- Game time: 12:00 PM EDT
- Game weather: Sunny • Temperature: 75 °F (24 °C) • Wind: SE at 10 miles per hour (16 km/h)
- Game attendance: 100,009
- Referee: Bryan Banks
- TV announcers (FOX): Gus Johnson (play-by-play), Joel Klatt (analyst), and Jenny Taft (sideline reporter)

Statistics	KENT	OSU
First downs	6	25
Plays–yards	55–134	66–527
Rushes–yards	34–71	38–145
Passing yards	63	382
Passing: comp–att–int	8–21–1	22–28–2
Turnovers	3	2
Time of possession	29:39	30:21

Team	Category	Player	Statistics
Kent State	Passing	Dru DeShields	6/15, 35 yards, INT
Kent State	Rushing	Brandon White	5 carries, 21 yards
Kent State	Receiving	Wayne Harris	2 receptions, 29 yards
Ohio State	Passing	Julian Sayin	18/22, 241 yards, 2 TD
Ohio State	Rushing	Bo Jackson	11 carries, 73 yards, TD
Ohio State	Receiving	Jeremiah Smith	5 receptions, 85 yards

=== vs Ball State ===
Ball State Cardinals (1–2) at Kent State Golden Flashes (1–2) – Game summary

Quarter	1	2	3	4	Total
Cardinals	0	0	0	0	0
Golden Flashes	0	0	0	0	0

at Dix Stadium • Kent, Ohio

- Date: September 26
- Game time: 12:00 p.m. EDT
- TV announcers (ESPN+): Michael Reghi and Je'Rod Cherry

Game information

First quarter
Second quarter
Third quarter
Fourth quarter

Statistics	BALL	KENT
First downs		
Plays–yards		
Rushes–yards		
Passing yards		
Passing: comp–att–int		
Turnovers		
Time of possession		

Team	Category	Player	Statistics
Ball State	Passing		
Ball State	Rushing		
Ball State	Receiving		
Kent State	Passing		
Kent State	Rushing		
Kent State	Receiving		

=== vs Ohio ===
Ohio Bobcats (2–2) at Kent State Golden Flashes (2–2) – Game summary

Quarter	1	2	3	4	Total
Bobcats	0	0	0	0	0
Golden Flashes	0	0	0	0	0

at Dix Stadium • Kent, Ohio

- Date: October 3
- Game time: 3:30 EDT
- TV announcers (ESPN+): Michael Reghi (play-by-play) Ryan Cavanaugh (analyst)

Game information

First quarter
Second quarter
Third quarter
Fourth quarter

Statistics	OHIO	KENT
First downs		
Plays–yards		
Rushes–yards		
Passing yards		
Passing: comp–att–int		
Turnovers		
Time of possession		

Team	Category	Player	Statistics
Ohio	Passing		
Ohio	Rushing		
Ohio	Receiving		
Kent State	Passing		
Kent State	Rushing		
Kent State	Receiving		

=== at Western Michigan ===
Kent State Golden Flashes (2–3) at Western Michigan Broncos (3–2) – Game summary

Quarter	1	2	3	4	Total
Golden Flashes	0	0	0	0	0
Broncos	0	0	0	0	0

at Waldo Stadium • Kalamazoo, Michigan

- Date: October 10

Game information

First quarter
Second quarter
Third quarter
Fourth quarter

Statistics	KENT	WMU
First downs		
Plays–yards		
Rushes–yards		
Passing yards		
Passing: comp–att–int		
Turnovers		
Time of possession		

Team	Category	Player	Statistics
Kent State	Passing		
Kent State	Rushing		
Kent State	Receiving		
Western Michigan	Passing		
Western Michigan	Rushing		
Western Michigan	Receiving		

=== at South Florida ===
Kent State Golden Flashes (2–4) at South Florida Bulls (4–2) – Game summary

Quarter	1	2	3	4	Total
Golden Flashes	0	0	0	0	0
Bulls	0	0	0	0	0

at Raymond James Stadium • Tampa, Florida

- Date: October 17

Game information

First quarter
Second quarter
Third quarter
Fourth quarter

Statistics	KENT	USF
First downs		
Plays–yards		
Rushes–yards		
Passing yards		
Passing: comp–att–int		
Turnovers		
Time of possession		

Team	Category	Player	Statistics
Kent State	Passing		
Kent State	Rushing		
Kent State	Receiving		
South Florida	Passing		
South Florida	Rushing		
South Florida	Receiving		

=== vs Akron (Wagon Wheel) ===
Akron Zips (1–6) at Kent State Golden Flashes (2–5) – Game summary

Quarter	1	2	3	4	Total
Zips	0	0	0	0	0
Golden Flashes	0	0	0	0	0

at Dix Stadium • Kent, Ohio

- Date: October 24

Game information

First quarter
Second quarter
Third quarter
Fourth quarter

Statistics	AKR	KENT
First downs		
Plays–yards		
Rushes–yards		
Passing yards		
Passing: comp–att–int		
Turnovers		
Time of possession		

Team	Category	Player	Statistics
Akron	Passing		
Akron	Rushing		
Akron	Receiving		
Kent State	Passing		
Kent State	Rushing		
Kent State	Receiving		

=== at Sacramento State ===
Kent State Golden Flashes (3–5) at Sacramento State Hornets (1–7) – Game summary

Quarter	1	2	3	4	Total
Golden Flashes	0	0	0	0	0
Hornets	0	0	0	0	0

at Hornet Stadium • Sacramento, California

- Date: October 30

Game information

First quarter
Second quarter
Third quarter
Fourth quarter

Statistics	KENT	SAC
First downs		
Plays–yards		
Rushes–yards		
Passing yards		
Passing: comp–att–int		
Turnovers		
Time of possession		

Team	Category	Player	Statistics
Kent State	Passing		
Kent State	Rushing		
Kent State	Receiving		
Sacramento State	Passing		
Sacramento State	Rushing		
Sacramento State	Receiving		

=== at Bowling Green (Anniversary Award) ===
Kent State Golden Flashes (3–6) at Bowling Green Falcons (2–7) – Game summary

Quarter	1	2	3	4	Total
Golden Flashes	0	0	0	0	0
Falcons	0	0	0	0	0

at Doyt Perry Stadium • Bowling Green, Ohio

- Date: November 10

Game information

First quarter
Second quarter
Third quarter
Fourth quarter

Statistics	KENT	BGSU
First downs		
Plays–yards		
Rushes–yards		
Passing yards		
Passing: comp–att–int		
Turnovers		
Time of possession		

Team	Category	Player	Statistics
Kent State	Passing		
Kent State	Rushing		
Kent State	Receiving		
Bowling Green	Passing		
Bowling Green	Rushing		
Bowling Green	Receiving		

=== vs Miami (OH) ===
Miami RedHawks (6–4) at Kent State Golden Flashes (3–7) – Game summary

Quarter	1	2	3	4	Total
RedHawks	0	0	0	0	0
Golden Flashes	0	0	0	0	0

at Dix Stadium • Kent, Ohio

- Date: November 17

Game information

First quarter
Second quarter
Third quarter
Fourth quarter

Statistics	M-OH	KENT
First downs		
Plays–yards		
Rushes–yards		
Passing yards		
Passing: comp–att–int		
Turnovers		
Time of possession		

Team	Category	Player	Statistics
Miami (OH)	Passing		
Miami (OH)	Rushing		
Miami (OH)	Receiving		
Kent State	Passing		
Kent State	Rushing		
Kent State	Receiving		

=== at Eastern Michigan ===
Kent State Golden Flashes (3–8) at Eastern Michigan Eagles (4–7) – Game summary

Quarter	1	2	3	4	Total
Golden Flashes	0	0	0	0	0
Eagles	0	0	0	0	0

at Rynearson Stadium • Ypsilanti, Michigan

- Date: November 24

Game information

First quarter
Second quarter
Third quarter
Fourth quarter

Statistics	KENT	EMU
First downs		
Plays–yards		
Rushes–yards		
Passing yards		
Passing: comp–att–int		
Turnovers		
Time of possession		

Team	Category	Player	Statistics
Kent State	Passing		
Kent State	Rushing		
Kent State	Receiving		
Eastern Michigan	Passing		
Eastern Michigan	Rushing		
Eastern Michigan	Receiving		

== Coaching staff ==
Name	Title	Year at school
Mark Carney	Head coach	4th
Clay Patterson	Offensive coordinator/quarterbacks	3rd
Cherokee Valeria	Defensive coordinator/safeties	2nd
Isaac Vance	Wide receivers	1st
Braxton Chapman	Running backs	1st
Alex Stadler	Offensive line	1st
Bill Teerlinck	Defensive line	3rd
Kevin Snyder	Linebackers	2nd
Bart Tanski	Cornerbacks	2nd
