= James Peoples (American football) =

American football player

No. 23 – Penn State Nittany Lions
- Position: Running back
- Class: Junior

Personal information
- Listed height: 5 ft 10 in (1.78 m)
- Listed weight: 214 lb (97 kg)

Career information
- High school: Veterans Memorial (San Antonio, Texas)
- College: Ohio State (2024–2025); Penn State (2026–present)

Awards and highlights
- CFP national champion (2024)
- Stats at ESPN

James Peoples is an American college football running back for the Penn State Nittany Lions. He previously played for the Ohio State Buckeyes.

== Early life ==
Peoples attended Veterans Memorial High School. As a sophomore, he notched 14 touchdowns and 1,263 all-purpose yards. During his junior season, Peoples rushed for 1,904 yards and 28 touchdowns. Coming out of high school, he was rated as a four-star recruit, the 5th best running back, and the 69th overall player in the class of 2024, and committed to play college football for the Ohio State Buckeyes over offers from schools such as Alabama, Oklahoma, Tennessee, Texas, and USC.

== College career ==
In the 2024 season opener, Peoples notched his first career touchdown in a win over Akron Zips. He played just 94 snaps as a freshman, rushing for 197 yards and two touchdowns on 49 carries. Peoples competed for the Buckeyes starting running back job ahead of the 2025 season. Peoples ultimately appeared in 10 games for the Buckeyes in 2025, recording his first career 2-TD game against the UCLA Bruins on November 15. He ended the season with 3 total touchdowns, 344 rushing yards on 61 carries, and 50 yards on 10 catches with no touchdowns. After the team was eliminated from the CFP Playoff by the Miami Hurricanes, on January 2, Peoples announced his intention to enter the transfer portal.

On January 6, Peoples committed to play for the Penn State Nittany Lions under new head coach Matt Campbell.

=== Statistics ===
College statistics
Season	Team	Games	Rushing				Receiving			
Season	Team	GP	Att	Yards	Avg	TD	Rec	Yards	Avg	TD
2024	Ohio State	8	49	197	4.0	2	1	-2	-2.0	0
2025	Ohio State	10	61	344	5.6	3	10	50	5.0	0
2026	Penn State	–	–	–	–	–	–	–	–	–
Career		–	110	541	4.9	5	11	48	4.4	0

== Personal life ==
His father, James Peoples, was a quarterback at Cleveland Heights, while his mother, Nakisha Peoples, was a Hall of Fame track athlete at Thiel College in Greenville, Pennsylvania.
