= Connor Barry =

American football quarterback (born c. 2004)

Penn State Nittany Lions
- Position: Quarterback

Personal information
- Born: 2004 (age 21–22); Vienna, Virginia, U.S.
- Listed height: 6 ft 1 in (1.85 m)
- Listed weight: 205 lb (93 kg)

Career information
- High school: James Madison (Vienna, Virginia)
- College: Appalachian State (2022); Christopher Newport (2023–2025); Penn State (2026–present)

Awards and highlights
- Second-team AFCA Division III All-American (2025); Gagliardi Trophy semifinalist (2025); NJAC Offensive Player of the Year (2025); 2× First-team All-NJAC (2024, 2025); Christopher Newport single-season record passing touchdowns (35 in 2025)

Career statistics
- Passing yards: 5,561
- Passing touchdowns: 55
- Rushing yards: 596
- Rushing touchdowns: 18

Connor Barry (born c. 2004) is an American college football quarterback for the Penn State Nittany Lions. He previously played for the Christopher Newport Captains and Appalachian State Mountaineers.

== Early years and high school ==
Barry attended James Madison High School in Vienna, Virginia. As a left-handed quarterback, he helped lead the team to a 13–2 record and a state runner-up finish during his senior season in 2021.

== College career ==
=== Appalachian State (2022) ===
Barry began his collegiate career at Appalachian State as a preferred walk-on. He did not appear in any games during the 2022 season.

=== Christopher Newport (2023–2025) ===
Barry transferred to Christopher Newport University prior to the 2023 season.

In 2023, as a freshman, he appeared in nine games (three starts), completing 42 of 74 passes for 745 yards, five touchdowns, and two interceptions. He also rushed 49 times for 150 yards and three touchdowns.

Barry became the starting quarterback in 2024. He completed 68% of his passes for 1,947 yards, 15 touchdowns, and two interceptions while rushing for additional scores, helping the Captains to a 7–3 record. He earned first-team All-NJAC honors, NJAC All-Academic recognition, and was named state Quarterback of the Year by the Touchdown Club of Richmond.

In 2025, Barry had a breakout season, setting Christopher Newport single-season records with 35 passing touchdowns and 2,866 passing yards. He completed 67% of his passes, averaged over 260 yards per game, and added 11 rushing touchdowns. He led the Captains to their first undefeated regular season (10–0) and a Division III playoff appearance. Barry was named NJAC Offensive Player of the Year, earned second-team AFCA All-America honors, was a Gagliardi Trophy semifinalist, received NJAC Offensive Player of the Week six times, and ranked second nationally in passing efficiency. Barry finished his Christopher Newport career with 5,561 passing yards, 55 passing touchdowns, 596 rushing yards, and 18 rushing touchdowns. He holds multiple school records, including career touchdown passes (55) and passing efficiency (185.2).

=== Penn State (2026–present) ===
In January 2026, Barry entered the NCAA transfer portal and committed to Penn State for his final year of eligibility following an official visit. He has one year of eligibility remaining.
