= Josiah Zayas =

American football player

No. 17 – Penn State Nittany Lions
- Position: Cornerback
- Class: Freshman

Personal information
- Listed height: 6 ft 2 in (1.88 m)
- Listed weight: 205 lb (93 kg)

Career information
- High school: Piscataway (Piscataway, New Jersey)
- College: Penn State (2026–present)
- Stats at ESPN

Josiah Zayas is an American college football cornerback for the Penn State Nittany Lions.

== Early life ==
Zayas attended St. Thomas Aquinas High School in Edison, New Jersey, before transferring to Piscataway High School in Piscataway, New Jersey, for his senior year. A cornerback and wide receiver in high school, he finished his career 67 tackles and nine interceptions on defense and 93 receptions for 1,784 yards and 26 touchdowns on offense. Zayas originally committed to play college football at Iowa State University before flipping his commitment to Penn State.

== College career ==
Zayas started the opening game of his true freshman season at Penn State in 2026, becoming the first Nittany Lion true freshman to start the opener on defense since John Reid in 2015. In the fourth game of the season against the Wisconsin Badgers, he had his first career interception, which he returned 51 yards for a touchdown.
