= Brett Eskildsen =

American football player

No. 4 – Penn State Nittany Lions
- Position: Wide receiver
- Class: Junior

Personal information
- Listed height: 6 ft 1 in (1.85 m)
- Listed weight: 198 lb (90 kg)

Career information
- High school: Centennial (Frisco, Texas)
- College: Iowa State (2024–2025); Penn State (2026–present)
- Stats at ESPN

Brett Eskildsen is an American football wide receiver for the Penn State Nittany Lions. He previously played for the Iowa State Cyclones.

== Early life ==
Eskildsen attended Centennial High School in Frisco, Texas. He initially committed to play college football for the Northwestern Wildcats, but de-committed after the firing of Pat Fitzgerald. Eskildsen later committed to play for the Iowa State Cyclones.

== College career ==
=== Iowa State ===
As a freshman in 2024, Eskildsen hauled in two passes and recorded three tackles in 13 games. He entered the 2025 season as a starter at receiver for the Cyclones. In week zero of the 2025 season, Eskildsen caught his first career touchdown in a victory versus Kansas State. In week 10, he brought in a 75-yard receiving touchdown against BYU. In week 13, Eskildsen hauled in two touchdown receptions in a victory over Kansas. He finished the 2025 season with 30 catches for 526 yards and five touchdowns, after which he entered his name into the NCAA transfer portal.

=== Penn State ===
Eskildsen transferred to play for the Penn State Nittany Lions.
