= Caleb Bacon =

American football player

No. 10 – Penn State Nittany Lions
- Position: Linebacker
- Class: Redshirt Senior

Personal information
- Listed height: 6 ft 4 in (1.93 m)
- Listed weight: 240 lb (109 kg)

Career information
- High school: Lake Mills (Lake Mills, Iowa)
- College: Iowa State (2021–2025); Penn State (2026–present)
- Stats at ESPN

Caleb Bacon is an American football linebacker for the Penn State Nittany Lions. He previously played for the Iowa State Cyclones.

== Early life ==
Bacon attended Lake Mills High School in Lake Mills, Iowa. He committed to play college football for the Iowa State Cyclones, joining the team as a preferred walk-on.

== College career ==
=== Iowa State ===
As a freshman in 2021, Bacon did not appear in any games and was redshirted. In 2022, he made three tackles in 10 games played. During the 2023 season, Bacon totaled 60 tackles with six and a half being for a loss and three sacks. In week one of the 2024 season, he suffered an injury versus North Dakota, which required surgery. As a result of the injury, Bacon missed the entirety of the 2024 season. He returned as a starter in 2025, totaling 68 tackles with nine and a half going for a loss and three sacks.

=== Penn State ===
Bacon transferred to play for the Penn State Nittany Lions.

== Personal life ==
Bacon is the older brother of Iowa State defensive back Logan Bacon.
