= Koby Howard =

American football player

No. 3 – Penn State Nittany Lions
- Position: Wide receiver
- Class: Sophomore

Personal information
- Listed height: 5 ft 11 in (1.80 m)
- Listed weight: 202 lb (92 kg)

Career information
- High school: Chaminade-Madonna (Hollywood, Florida)
- College: Penn State (2025–present)
- Stats at ESPN

Koby Anthony Howard is an American football wide receiver for the Penn State Nittany Lions.

== Early life ==
Howard grew up in Pensacola, Florida, and attended Pensacola Catholic High School before transferring to Western High School in Davie, Florida, during his junior year. He then transferred to Chaminade–Madonna College Preparatory School in Hollywood, Florida, for his senior year. Howard committed to play college football for the Penn State Nittany Lions.

== College career ==
In 2025, Howard had strong performances spring and summer practices. In week 10 of the 2025 season, he hauled in a 26-yard reception in a loss against Ohio State. Howard finished the season with seven catches for 133 yards.

Howard entered the 2026 season, in line to be a starter for the Nittany Lions.
