= Benjamin Brahmer =

American football player (born 2004)

No. 18 – Penn State Nittany Lions
- Position: Tight end
- Class: Senior

Personal information
- Born: November 19, 2004 (age 21)
- Listed height: 6 ft 7 in (2.01 m)
- Listed weight: 250 lb (113 kg)

Career information
- High school: Pierce (Pierce, Nebraska)
- College: Iowa State (2023–2025); Penn State (2026–present)

Awards and highlights
- Second-team All-Big 12 (2025)
- Stats at ESPN

Benjamin Brahmer (born November 19, 2004) is an American college football tight end for the Penn State Nittany Lions of the Big 10 Conference.

== Early life ==
Brahmer grew up in Pierce, Nebraska and attended Pierce High School. He was rated a three-star recruit and initially committed to play college football at Nebraska during his sophomore year of high school. Brahmer later flipped his commitment to Iowa State during his senior year.

== College career ==
Brahmer entered his freshman season with the Iowa State Cyclones as a starter at tight end. He finished the season with 28 receptions for 352 yards and two touchdowns. Brahmer was an honorable mention Big 12 Conference selection and was named a freshman All-American by The Athletic at the end of the season. He transferred to Penn State on January 3, 2026.

=== Statistics ===
Year	Team	Games		Receiving			
Year	Team	GP	GS	Rec	Yds	Avg	TD
2023	Iowa State	13	2	28	352	12.6	2
2024	Iowa State	8	2	10	179	17.9	1
2025	Iowa State	12	10	37	446	12.1	6
Career		33	14	75	977	13.0	9
