= Chase Sowell =

American football player (born 2004)

No. 3 – Penn State Nittany Lions
- Position: Wide receiver
- Class: Redshirt Senior

Personal information
- Born: June 23, 2004 (age 22); Gainesville, Florida, U.S.
- Listed height: 6 ft 3 in (1.91 m)
- Listed weight: 203 lb (92 kg)

Career information
- High school: Atascocita (Atascocita, Texas)
- College: Colorado (2022); East Carolina (2023–2024); Iowa State (2025); Penn State (2026–present)

Awards and highlights
- Second-team All-AAC (2024)
- Stats at ESPN

Chase Sowell (born June 23, 2004) is an American football wide receiver for the Penn State Nittany Lions. He previously played for the Colorado Buffaloes, the East Carolina Pirates, and the Iowa State Cyclones.

== Early life ==
Sowell attended Atascocita High School in Atascocita, Texas. He committed to play college football for the Colorado Buffaloes over offers from other schools such as Northern Iowa, Incarnate Word, UTSA, and Sam Houston.

== College career ==
=== Colorado ===
As a freshman in 2022, Sowell appeared in three games with one start, bringing in two passes for 23 yards. After the conclusion of the season, he entered the NCAA transfer portal.

=== East Carolina ===
Sowell transferred to play for the East Carolina Pirates. In 2023, he recorded 47 receptions for 622 yards and a touchdown. During the 2024 season, Sowell totaled 34 catches for 678 yards and three touchdowns in nine games. After the season, he again entered the transfer portal.

=== Iowa State ===
Sowell transferred to play for the Iowa State Cyclones. In week 5 of the 2025 season, he hauled in four passes for 146 yards in a win over Arizona Wildcats. In week 7, he hauled in two passes for 25 yards in a loss to Colorado. Sowell finished the 2025 season with 32 receptions for 500 yards and two touchdowns. After the season, he once again entered the transfer portal.

=== Penn State ===
Following head coach Matt Campbell, Sowell transferred to play for the Penn State Nittany Lions. In week 2 of the 2026 season, Sowell hauled in five passes for 58 yards and his first touchdown as a Nittany Lion.
