= Andrew Rappleyea =

American football player (born 2004)

No. 87 – Penn State Nittany Lions
- Position: Tight end
- Class: Redshirt Sophomore

Personal information
- Born: February 22, 2004 (age 22)
- Listed height: 6 ft 4 in (1.93 m)
- Listed weight: 251 lb (114 kg)

Career information
- High school: Milton Academy (Milton, Massachusetts)
- College: Penn State (2023–present)
- Stats at ESPN

Andrew Kenneth Rappleyea (born February 22, 2004) is an American college football tight end for the Penn State Nittany Lions.

== Early life ==
Rappleyea grew up in Millbrook, New York, and initially attended Our Lady of Lourdes High School. He transferred to Milton Academy in Milton, Massachusetts after his sophomore year. While at Milton Academy, Rappleyea boarded in Wolcott House for all of his three years. Rappleyea caught 27 passes for 517 yards in nine games during his junior season. As a senior he had 23 catches for 499 yards and six touchdowns.

Rappleyea was rated a four-star recruit and one of the top tight end prospects in the 2023 recruiting class. He originally committed to play college football at Michigan over offers from Penn State, Ohio State, Wisconsin, Wake Forest, and North Carolina. Rappleyea later flipped his commitment to Penn State.

== College career ==
Rappleyea played in three games while he redshirted his true freshman season at Penn State. He started the season opener of his redshirt freshman season, but suffered a season-ending injury in the game.
