= Carson Hansen =

American football player

No. 21 – Penn State Nittany Lions
- Position: Running back
- Class: Senior

Personal information
- Listed height: 6 ft 2 in (1.88 m)
- Listed weight: 220 lb (100 kg)

Career information
- High school: Lakeville South (Lakeville, Minnesota)
- College: Iowa State (2023–2025); Penn State (2026–present)

Awards and highlights
- Second-team All-Big 12 (2025)
- Stats at ESPN

Carson Hansen is an American college football running back for the Penn State Nittany Lions. He previously played for the Iowa State Cyclones.

== Early life ==
Hansen attended Lakeville South High School in Lakeville, Minnesota. As a senior he recorded 1,908 total yards and 25 total touchdowns, being named the Star Tribune Metro Player of the Year. Hansen finished his high school career totaling 4,532 yards and 57 touchdowns, being named the Gatorade Minnesota Football Player of the Year twice. A three-star recruit, he committed to play college football at Iowa State University over offers from Kansas State, Northwestern, and Wyoming.

== College career ==
As a freshman in 2023, Hansen rushed 67 yards, while also tallying 11 receptions for 115 yards. The following season, his role increased, as against West Virginia, he rushed for 96 yards three touchdowns. In the 2024 Pop-Tarts Bowl he rushed for 82 yards and totaled three touchdowns, helping lead the Cyclones to a 42–41 victory over Miami. Hansen finished the 2024 season, with 151 carries for 752 yards and 13 touchdowns.

On January 4, 2026, Hansen announced his decision to transfer to Pennsylvania State University to play for the Penn State Nittany Lions.

=== Statistics ===
Year	Team	Games		Rushing				Receiving			
Year	Team	GP	GS	Att	Yds	Avg	TD	Rec	Yds	Avg	TD
2023	Iowa State	13	0	22	67	3.0	0	11	115	10.5	0
2024	Iowa State	14	8	151	752	5.0	13	13	88	6.8	2
2025	Iowa State	11	9	188	952	5.1	6	19	134	7.1	0
Career		38	17	361	1,771	4.9	19	43	337	7.8	2
