= 2026 Mid-American Conference football season =

- League: NCAA Division I Football Bowl Subdivision
- Sport: Football
- Duration: August 29– December 5
- Teams: 13

Regular season

MAC Championship Game
- Date: December 5, 2026
- Venue: Ford Field, Detroit, Michigan

Seasons
- 2025 2027

2026 Mid-American Conference football standings
	Conf.			Overall
Team	W		L	W		L
Ohio	6	–	1	8	–	3
Western Michigan	6	–	1	8	–	3
Buffalo	6	–	1	8	–	3
Toledo	6	–	1	9	–	2
Miami (OH)	5	–	2	7	–	4
Central Michigan	3	–	4	5	–	6
Eastern Michigan	3	–	4	4	–	7
Bowling Green	3	–	4	3	–	8
UMass	2	–	5	5	–	6
Kent State	2	–	5	3	–	8
Ball State	2	–	5	3	–	8
Akron	1	–	6	2	–	9
Sacramento State	1	–	7	2	–	9
Championship: December 5, 2026
As of November 21, 2026; Rankings from AP poll

The 2026 Mid-American Conference football season will be the 81st season for the Mid-American Conference (MAC), as part of the 2026 NCAA Division I FBS football season. Non-conference play will begin on September 3. Conference play began on August 29 and conclude with the MAC championship game on December 5 at Ford Field in Detroit, Michigan. For the third straight season, the MAC will not have divisions. The Championship game will feature the two teams with the best conference records. This will be the first season without Northern Illinois since 1997 as it joined the Mountain West Conference for football. On February 14, 2026, the conference announced that Sacramento State would transition from FCS to FBS and begin play in the MAC in 2026.

== Preseason ==
The MAC Football Kickoff was held on Wednesday, July 22, 2026, at the Ford Field in Detroit, Michigan from 9:00 am EDT to 1:30 pm EDT. Commissioner Jon Steinbrecher spoke. Each team had their head coach and a student athlete from both the offense and the defense available to speak to the media.

- Akron – Head Coach Joe Moorhead; Jordan Gant, R-Sr, TB; Cyrus Durham, R-Jr., DE
- Ball State – Head Coach Mike Uremovich; Chris Hood, R-Sr., OL; Justin Thomas, R-Sr., LB
- Bowling Green – Head Coach Eddie George; Austyn Dendy, So., RB; Eriq George, Sr., DE
- Buffalo – Head Coach Pete Lembo, Terrance Shelton Jr., Jr., RB; Cornell Evans, Grad., DT
- Central Michigan – Head Coach Matt Drinkall; Langston Lewis, R-Sr., WR; Jaion Jackson, Jr., DB
- Eastern Michigan – Head Coach Chris Creighton; Noah Kim, Grad., QB; Bryce Llewellyn, Sr., DB
- Kent State – Head Coach Mark Carney; Dru DeShields, R-Jr., QB; Thomas Aden, Sr., DL
- UMass – Head Coach Joe Harasymiak; Pop Watson III, R-Jr., QB; Tyler Martin, R-Sr., LB
- Miami (OH) – Head Coach Chuck Martin; Eric Smith, R-Sr., OL; Malcolm McCain, LB
- Ohio – Head Coach John Hauser; Duncan Brune, Jr., RB; DJ Walker, R-Jr., S
- Sacramento State – Head Coach Alonzo Carter; Carson Conklin, Jr., QB; Derek Houston, Jr., LB
- Toledo – Head Coach Mike Jacobs; John Alan Richter, Jr., QB; Andrew Zock, Jr., DE
- Western Michigan – Head Coach Lance Taylor; Broc Lowry, R-Jr., QB; Jarvarius Sims, R-Sr., DB

=== Preseason coaches poll ===
On July 22, the MAC announced the preseason coaches poll. Western Michigan was named the preseason favorite to win the conference while last year's other finalist, Miami, also received votes to win the championship.

Predicted finish	Team	Points (1st place votes)
1	Western Michigan	138 (9)
2	Miami (OH)	134 (4)
3	Toledo	115
4	Ohio	107
5	Central Michigan	101
6	Buffalo	81
7	Eastern Michigan	76
8	Kent State	64
9	Bowling Green	59
10	Akron	52
11	Ball State	34
12	Sacramento State	28
13	Massachusetts	25

Predicted MAC champion
Rank	Team	Votes
1	Western Michigan	9
2	Miami (OH)	4

=== Preseason individual awards ===
Award	Head Coach/Player	School	Position	Year	Ref
Lott Trophy	none				
Dodd Trophy	none		HC	--	
Maxwell Award	Jordan Gant	Akron	RB	Sr.	
Maxwell Award	Broc Lowry	Western Michigan	QB	Jr.	
Maxwell Award	Jalen Buckley	Western Michigan	RB	Sr.	
Bronko Nagurski Trophy	Josh Franklin	Western Michigan	DB	Sr.	
Bronko Nagurski Trophy	Bryce Llewellyn	Eastern Michigan	S	Gr.	
Outland Trophy	Evan Malcore	Miami	OT	R-Sr.	
Outland Trophy	Chad Schuster	Western Michigan	OT	R-Sr.	
Butkus Award	Blayne Myrick	Miami	LB	R-Sr.	
Jim Thorpe Award	DJ Walker	Ohio	S	R-Jr.	
Paul Hornung Award	Keith Reynolds	Miami	WR	R-Jr.	
Wuerffel Trophy	Caden Britton	Ball State	LS	R-Sr.	
Wuerffel Trophy	Stevie Bracey	Buffalo	LB	5Y Sr.	
Wuerffel Trophy	Angel Flores	Central Michigan	QB	R-Sr.	
Wuerffel Trophy	Dennis Strey Jr.	Eastern Michigan	OL	Gr.	
Wuerffel Trophy	Wayne Harris	Kent State	WR	R-So.	
Wuerffel Trophy	DJ Walker	Ohio	S	R-Jr.	
Wuerffel Trophy	Derek Houston	Sacramento State	LB	R-Jr.	
Wuerffel Trophy	Matt Hofer	Toledo	OL	R-So.	
Wuerffel Trophy	Riley Bloch	UMass	OL	R-So.	
Wuerffel Trophy	Dakari Frazier	Western Michigan	DL	R-Jr.	
Lou Groza Award	none		K	--	
Ray Guy Award	Pierse Stainton	Miami	P	Sr.	
Patrick Mannelly Award	none		LS	--	
Walter Camp Award	Broc Lowry	Western Michigan	QB	Jr.	
Doak Walker Award	Vaughn Blue	Central Michigan	RB	Sr.	
Doak Walker Award	Braydon Bennett	Eastern Michigan	RB	Gr.	
Doak Walker Award	CJ Miller	Toledo	RB	R-Jr.	
Biletnikoff Award	none		WR	--	

Award	Head Coach/Player	School	Position	Year	Ref
Davey O'Brien Award	Broc Lowry	Western Michigan	QB	R-Jr.	
John Mackey Award	Terik Mulder	Kent State	TE	R-Sr.	
John Mackey Award	Joshua Long	Eastern Michigan	TE	Jr.	
Rimington Trophy	Nicholas Gallegos	Eastern Michigan	C	Gr.	
Bednarik Award	DJ Walker	Ohio	S	R-Jr.	
Rotary Lombardi Award	Chad Schuster	Western Michigan	OT	R-Sr.	
Manning Award	none			QB	
Comeback Player of the Year Award	Daymon David	Akron	S	GS	
Comeback Player of the Year Award	Corey Thompson Jr.	Ball State	WR	Jr.	
Comeback Player of the Year Award	Dorian Pringle	Bowling Green	LB	So.	
Comeback Player of the Year Award	Jadyn Glasser	Central Michigan	QB	Jr.	
Comeback Player of the Year Award	Joshua Nobles	UMass	DL	GS	
Comeback Player of the Year Award	T.Y. Harding	UMass	WR	Sr.	
Comeback Player of the Year Award	TJ Magee	UMass	CB	Sr.	
Comeback Player of the Year Award	Cole Cabana	Western Michigan	RB	R-Jr.	
Polynesian College Football Player Of The Year Award	none				
Johnny Unitas Golden Arm Award	Broc Lowry	Western Michigan	QB	R-Jr.	
Earl Campbell Tyler Rose Award	none				
Shaun Alexander Freshman of the Year Award	none				

== Coaches ==
=== Coaching changes ===
The MAC will enter the 2026 season with four head coaching changes from the start of the 2025 season.

==== Kent State ====
On October 30, 2025, Mark Carney, who had been the interim head coach for most of the 2025 season, was promoted to permanent head coach.

==== Ohio ====
On December 1, 2025, Ohio University announced that head coach Brian Smith was on indefinite leave. Defensive coordinator John Hauser was named the interim head coach. On December 16, the University terminated Smith for cause. Hauser was named full-time head coach, three days after winning the Frisco Bowl, on December 26.

==== Sacramento State ====
Brennan Marion left after one 7–5 season with the Hornets to accept the offensive coordinator position at Colorado On December 15, 2025, Arizona associate head coach Alonzo Carter was named the new head coach.

==== Toledo ====
On December 6, 2025, Rocket head coach Jason Candle accepted head coach position at the University of Connecticut. Mercer head coach Mike Jacobs was named head football coach by the on December 10, 2025.

=== Head coaching records ===
Team	Head coach	Previous Job	Years at school	Record at school	MAC record	MAC titles
Akron	Joe Moorhead	Oregon (offensive coordinator)	4	13–35 (.271)	9–23 (.281)	0
Ball State	Mike Uremovich	Butler	2	4–8 (.333)	3–5 (.375)	0
Bowling Green	Eddie George	Tennessee State	2	4–8 (.333)	2–6 (.250)	0
Buffalo	Pete Lembo	South Carolina (associate head coach/special teams coordinator)	3	14–11 (.560)	10–6 (.625)	0
Central Michigan	Matt Drinkall	Army (OL coach)	2	7–6 (.538)	5–3 (.625)	0
Eastern Michigan	Chris Creighton	Drake	13	61–83 (.424)	36–58 (.383)	0
Kent State	Mark Carney	Kent State (offensive coordinator)	2	5–7 (.417)	4–4 (.500)	0
Miami (OH)	Chuck Martin	Notre Dame (offensive coordinator/QB coach)	12	72–74 (.493)	57–34 (.626)	2
Ohio	John Hauser	Ohio (associate head coach/defensive coordinator)	1	1–0 (1.000)	0–0 (–)	0
Sacramento State	Alonzo Carter	Arizona (associate head coach/RB coach)	1	0–0 (–)	0–0 (–)	0
Toledo	Mike Jacobs	Mercer	1	0–0 (–)	0–0 (–)	0
UMass	Joe Harasymiak	Rutgers (defensive coordinator)	2	0–0 (–)	0–0 (–)	0
Western Michigan	Lance Taylor	Louisville (offensive coordinator)	4	20–19 (.513)	15–9 (.625)	1

Source -

== Rankings ==
		Pre	Wk 1	Wk 2	Wk 3	Wk 4	Wk 5	Wk 6	Wk 7	Wk 8	Wk 9	Wk 10	Wk 11	Wk 12	Wk 13	Wk 14	Wk 15	Final
Akron	AP																	
Akron	C																	
Akron	CFP	Not released																
Ball State	AP																	
Ball State	C																	
Ball State	CFP	Not released																
Bowling Green	AP																	
Bowling Green	C																	
Bowling Green	CFP	Not released																
Buffalo	AP																	
Buffalo	C																	
Buffalo	CFP	Not released																
Central Michigan	AP																	
Central Michigan	C																	
Central Michigan	CFP	Not released																
Eastern Michigan	AP																	
Eastern Michigan	C																	
Eastern Michigan	CFP	Not released																
Kent State	AP																	
Kent State	C																	
Kent State	CFP	Not released																
Miami (OH)	AP																	
Miami (OH)	C																	
Miami (OH)	CFP	Not released																
Ohio	AP																	
Ohio	C																	
Ohio	CFP	Not released																
Sacramento State	AP																	
Sacramento State	C																	
Sacramento State	CFP	Not released																
Toledo	AP																	
Toledo	C																	
Toledo	CFP	Not released																
UMass	AP																	
UMass	C				RV	RV												
UMass	CFP	Not released																
Western Michigan	AP	RV	RV	RV	RV													
Western Michigan	C	RV	RV	RV	RV	RV												
Western Michigan	CFP	Not released																

Legend
	Improvement in ranking
	Drop in ranking
	Not ranked previous week
	No change in ranking from previous week
RV	Received votes but were not ranked in Top 25 of poll
т	Tied with team above or below also with this symbol

AP -

Coaches -

CFP -

== Schedule ==
Index to colors and formatting
MAC member won
MAC member lost
MAC teams in **bold**

All times Eastern time.

=== Week 0 ===
Date	Time	Visiting team	Home team	Site	TV	Result	Attendance	Ref.
August 29	6:30 p.m.	**Sacramento State**	**Eastern Michigan**	Rynearson Stadium • Ypsilanti, MI	ESPN+	**EMU** 28–17	9,401	
^{#}Rankings from AP Poll released prior to game. All times are in Eastern Time.

=== Week 1 ===
Date	Time	Visiting team	Home team	Site	TV	Result	Attendance	Ref.
September 3	6:00 p.m.	**UMass**	Rutgers	SHI Stadium • Piscataway, NJ	BTN	**W** 37–21	42,454	
September 3	7:00 p.m.	Albany	**Buffalo**	University at Buffalo Stadium • Buffalo, NY	ESPN+	**W** 21–17	8,690	
September 3	7:00 p.m.	**Akron**	Wake Forest	Allegacy Federal Credit Union Stadium • Winston-Salem, NC	ACCN	**L** 16–38	30,735	
September 4	6:30 p.m.	San Jose State	**Eastern Michigan**	Rynearson Stadium • Ypsilanti, MI	ESPN+	**L** 21–27	5,646	
September 4	8:00 p.m.	**Toledo**	Michigan State	Spartan Stadium • East Lansing, MI	FS1	**L** 20–30	72,083	
September 5	12:00 p.m.	**Ohio**	Nebraska	Memorial Stadium • Lincoln, NE	FS1	**L** 21–49	85,577	
September 5	12:00 p.m.	No. 5 (FCS) Tarleton State	**Bowling Green**	Doyt Perry Stadium • Bowling Green, OH	ESPN+	**L** 13–20	13,367	
September 5	12:00 p.m.	**Miami (OH)**	Pittsburgh	Acrisure Stadium • Pittsburgh, PA	The CW	**L** 14–59	43,929	
September 5	12:30 p.m.	**Ball State**	No. 1 Ohio State	Ohio Stadium • Columbus, OH	BTN	**L** 3–56	101,120	
September 5	12:45 p.m.	**Kent State**	South Carolina	Williams–Brice Stadium • Columbia, SC	SECN	**L** 0–57	77,559	
September 5	7:30 p.m.	**Western Michigan**	No. 16 Michigan	Michigan Stadium • Ann Arbor, MI	NBC	**L** 12–13	110,879	
September 5	10:00 p.m.	**Central Michigan**	New Mexico	University Stadium • Albuquerque, NM	FS1	**L** 7–38	24,126	
September 5	10:00 p.m.	Mississippi Valley State	**Sacramento State**	Hornet Stadium • Sacramento, CA	ESPN+	**W** 52–0	18,523	
^{#}Rankings from AP Poll released prior to game. All times are in Eastern Time.

=== Week 2 ===
Date	Time	Visiting team	Home team	Site	TV	Result	Attendance	Ref.
September 12	12:00 p.m.	Wofford	**Kent State**	Dix Stadium • Kent, OH	ESPN+	**W** 36–15	7,887	
September 12	1:00 p.m.	Colgate	**Central Michigan**	Kelly/Shorts Stadium • Mount Pleasant, MI	ESPN+	**W** 13–10	19,005	
September 12	1:00 p.m.	Holy Cross	**Miami (OH)**	Yager Stadium • Oxford, OH	ESPN+	**W** 45–7	11,126	
September 12	2:00 p.m.	Stony Brook	**Ball State**	Scheumann Stadium • Muncie, IN	ESPN+	**W** 41–17	10,390	
September 12	3:30 p.m.	**Eastern Michigan**	Michigan State	Spartan Stadium • East Lansing, MI	BTN	**L** 7–35	70,712	
September 12	3:30 p.m.	Robert Morris	**Akron**	InfoCision Stadium–Summa Field • Akron, OH	ESPN+	**W** 45–10	21,037	
September 12	3:30 p.m.	Sacred Heart	**UMass**	Warren McGuirk Alumni Stadium • Hadley, MA	ESPN+	**W** 37–10	14,895	
September 12	3:30 p.m.	Central Connecticut	**Toledo**	Glass Bowl • Toledo, OH	ESPN+	**W** 63–10	18,435	
September 12	6:00 p.m.	**Buffalo**	FIU	Pitbull Stadium • Miami, FL	ESPN+	**L** 20–33	18,202	
September 12	6:00 p.m.	Jacksonville State	**Ohio**	Peden Stadium • Athens, OH	ESPN+	**W** 29–27 ^{4OT}	21,037	
September 12	6:30 p.m.	Monmouth	**Western Michigan**	Waldo Stadium • Kalamazoo, MI	ESPN+	**W** 49–14	24,605	
September 12	7:00 p.m.	**Bowling Green**	Nebraska	Memorial Stadium • Lincoln, NE	FS1	**L** 7–56	86,193	
September 12	10:30 p.m.	**Sacramento State**	Fresno State	Valley Children's Stadium • Fresno, CA	CBSSN	**L** 3–49	40,198	
^{#}Rankings from AP Poll released prior to game. All times are in Eastern Time.

=== Week 3 ===
Date	Time	Visiting team	Home team	Site	TV	Result	Attendance	Ref.
September 19	12:00 p.m.	**Akron**	Minnesota	Huntington Bank Stadium • Minneapolis, MN	RTN	**L** 7–41	40,168	
September 19	12:00 p.m.	**Bowling Green**	Iowa State	Jack Trice Stadium • Ames, IA	ESPNU	**L** 7–55	50,395	
September 19	12:00 p.m.	**Buffalo**	No. 14 Penn State	Beaver Stadium • University Park, PA	BTN	**L** 13–55	103,817	
September 19	12:00 p.m.	**Kent State**	No. 6 Ohio State	Ohio Stadium • Columbus, OH	FOX	**L** 3–59	100,009	
September 19	12:30 p.m.	**Eastern Michigan**	Wisconsin	Camp Randall Stadium • Madison, WI	Peacock	**L** 10–54	66,545	
September 19	1:00 p.m.	Wyoming	**Central Michigan**	Kelly/Shorts Stadium • Mount Pleasant, MI	ESPN+	**W** 24–10	15,552	
September 19	3:30 p.m.	Temple	**Toledo**	Glass Bowl • Toledo, OH	CBSSN	**W** 49–48 ^{OT}	19,011	
September 19	3:30 p.m.	**Miami (OH)**	Cincinnati	TQL Stadium • Cincinnati, OH (Victory Bell)	ESPN+	**L** 31–35	19,188	
September 19	3:30 p.m.	Stonehill	**UMass**	Warren McGuirk Alumni Stadium • Hadley, MA	ESPN+	**W** 36–14	12,233	
September 19	4:00 p.m.	**Ball State**	Liberty	Williams Stadium • Lynchburg, VA	ESPN+	**L** 15–51	18,330	
September 19	7:00 p.m.	**Ohio**	South Alabama	Hancock Whitney Stadium • Mobile, AL	ESPN+	**L** 35–41	15,232	
September 19	7:00 p.m.	**Western Michigan**	Rice	Rice Stadium • Houston, TX	ESPN+	**W** 28–21	14,255	
September 19	10:30 p.m.	North Dakota State	**Sacramento State**	Hornet Stadium • Sacramento, CA	ESPN	**L** 10–31	13,322	
^{#}Rankings from AP Poll released prior to game. All times are in Eastern Time.

=== Week 4 ===
Date	Time	Visiting team	Home team	Site	TV	Result	Attendance	Ref.
September 26	12:00 p.m.	**Ball State**	**Kent State**	Dix Stadium • Kent, OH	ESPN+	**KSU** 26–13	11,059	
September 26	12:00 p.m.	UNLV	**Akron**	InfoCision Stadium–Summa Field • Akron, OH	ESPN+	**L** 10–38	5,607	
September 26	12:00 p.m.	San Diego State	**Toledo**	Glass Bowl • Toledo, OH	CBSSN	**W** 41–16	22,126	
September 26	1:00 p.m.	Lindenwood	**Eastern Michigan**	Rynearson Stadium • Ypsilanti, MI	ESPN+	**W** 29–3	6,109	
September 26	3:30 p.m.	Boise State	**Western Michigan**	Waldo Stadium • Kalamazoo, MI	ESPN2	**L** 7–32	29,700	
September 26†	3:30 p.m.	Robert Morris	**Buffalo**	University at Buffalo Stadium • Buffalo, NY	ESPN+	**W** 31–28	11,449	
September 26	3:30 p.m.	Stonehill	**Ohio**	Peden Stadium • Athens, OH	ESPN+	**W** 35–7	20,723	
September 26†	3:30 p.m.	UConn	**Miami (OH)**	Yager Stadium • Oxford, OH	ESPN+	**W** 24–21	18,180	
September 26†	5:00 p.m.	South Florida	**Bowling Green**	Doyt Perry Stadium • Bowling Green, OH	ESPN+	**L** 6–14	22,265	
September 26	6:30 p.m.	**Central Michigan**	No. 6 Miami (FL)	Hard Rock Stadium • Miami Gardens, FL	The CW	**L** 3–52	65,338	
September 26	9:00 p.m.	**UMass**	**Sacramento State**	Hornet Stadium • Sacramento, CA	ESPN+	**UMASS** 35–6	11,007	
^{†}Homecoming. ^{#}Rankings from AP Poll released prior to game. All times are in Eastern Time.

=== Week 5 ===
Date	Time	Visiting team	Home team	Site	TV	Result	Attendance	Ref.
October 3	1:00 p.m.	Western Michigan	Buffalo	University at Buffalo Stadium • Buffalo, NY	ESPN+	**WMU** 20–17	6,350	
October 3	2:00 p.m.	Toledo	Ball State	Scheumann Stadium • Muncie, IN	ESPN+	**TOL** 39–24	9,744	
October 3†	3:30 p.m.	Akron	Central Michigan	Kelly/Shorts Stadium • Mount Pleasant, MI	ESPN+	**CMU** 41–17	20,102	
October 3	3:30 p.m.	Bowling Green	Miami (OH)	Yager Stadium • Oxford, OH	ESPN+	**BGSU** 24–20	12,474	
October 3†	3:30 p.m.	Ohio	Kent State	Dix Stadium • Kent, OH	ESPN+	**OHIO** 13–10	13,022	
October 3	3:30 p.m.	Eastern Michigan	UMass	Warren McGuirk Alumni Stadium • Hadley, MA	ESPN+	**EMU** 38–14	17,119	
^{†}Homecoming. ^{#}Rankings from AP Poll released prior to game. All times are in Eastern Time.

=== Week 6 ===
Date	Time	Visiting team	Home team	Site	TV	Result	Attendance	Ref.
October 10	12:00 p.m.	Sacramento State	**Bowling Green**	Doyt Perry Stadium • Bowling Green, OH	ESPN+	**BGSU** 38–10	12,559	
October 10	12:30 p.m.	Ball State	Northwestern	Martin Stadium • Evanston, IL	BTN	**L** 14–45	25,629	
October 10†	2:00 p.m.	Miami (OH)	**UMass**	Warren McGuirk Alumni Stadium • Hadley, MA	ESPN+	**M-OH** 20–19	13,887	
October 10†	3:30 p.m.	Buffalo	**Toledo**	Glass Bowl • Toledo, OH	ESPN+	**UB** 23–8	24,767	
October 10†	3:30 p.m.	Central Michigan	**Ohio**	Peden Stadium • Athens, OH	ESPN+	**OHIO** 31–14	21,368	
October 10†	3:30 p.m.	Eastern Michigan	**Akron**	InfoCision Stadium–Summa Field • Akron, OH	ESPN+	**EMU** 25–23	9,038	
October 10†	3:30 p.m.	Kent State	**Western Michigan**	Waldo Stadium • Kalamazoo, MI	ESPN+	**WMU** 38–7	20,868	
^{†}Homecoming. ^{#}Rankings from AP Poll released prior to game. All times are in Eastern Time.

=== Week 7 ===
Date	Time	Visiting team	Home team	Site	TV	Result	Attendance	Ref.
October 17	12:00 p.m.	Ball State	**Bowling Green**	Doyt Perry Stadium • Bowling Green, OH	ESPN+	**BSU** 32–31 ^{OT}	19,875	
October 17	1:00 p.m.	UMass	**Buffalo**	University at Buffalo Stadium • Buffalo, NY	ESPN+	**UB** 25–18 ^{OT}	6,037	
October 17	1:30 p.m.	Western Michigan	**Central Michigan**	Kelly/Shorts Stadium • Mount Pleasant, MI (Michigan MAC Trophy, rivalry)	ESPN+	**WMU** 21–14	25,352	
October 17	3:30 p.m.	Akron	**Miami (OH)**	Yager Stadium • Oxford, OH	ESPN+	**M-OH** 34–14	18,515	
October 17†	3:30 p.m.	Toledo	**Eastern Michigan**	Rynearson Stadium • Ypsilanti, MI	ESPN+	**TOL** 34–14	10,373	
October 17	7:00 p.m.	Kent State	South Florida	Raymond James Stadium • Tampa, FL	ESPN+	**L** 2–29	31,384	
October 17†	10:00 p.m.	Ohio	**Sacramento State**	Hornet Stadium • Sacramento, CA	ESPN+	**OHIO** 48–7	17,661	
^{†}Homecoming. ^{#}Rankings from AP Poll released prior to game. All times are in Eastern Time.

=== Week 8 ===
Date	Time	Visiting team	Home team	Site	TV	Result	Attendance	Ref.
October 23	7:00 p.m.	UMass	UConn	Pratt & Whitney Stadium at Rentschler Field • East Hartford, CT (rivalry)	CBSSN	**L** 16–35	32,106	
October 24	12:00 p.m.	Western Michigan	**Toledo**	Glass Bowl • Toledo, OH	CBSSN	**TOL** 45–38	23,836	
October 24	1:00 p.m.	Miami (OH)	**Central Michigan**	Kelly/Shorts Stadium • Mount Pleasant, MI	ESPN+	**M-OH** 28–27	13,269	
October 24	1:00 p.m.	Akron	**Kent State**	Dix Stadium • Kent, OH (Wagon Wheel)	ESPN+	**KSU** 35–20	12,375	
October 24	3:30 p.m.	Bowling Green	**Buffalo**	University at Buffalo Stadium • Buffalo, NY	ESPN+	**UB** 31–24	5,988	
October 24†	3:30 p.m.	Sacramento State	**Ball State**	Scheumann Stadium • Muncie, IN	ESPN+	**BSU** 34–17	12,518	
October 24	4:00 p.m.	Eastern Michigan	**Ohio**	Peden Stadium • Athens, OH	ESPN+	**OHIO** 24–20	18,813	
^{†}Homecoming. ^{#}Rankings from AP Poll released prior to game. All times are in Eastern Time.

=== Week 9 ===
Date	Time	Visiting team	Home team	Site	TV	Result	Attendance	Ref.
October 30	10:30 p.m.	**Kent State**	**Sacramento State**	Hornet Stadium • Sacramento, CA	ESPN2	**SAC** 31–10	9,931	
October 31	12:00 p.m.	**Western Michigan**	**Bowling Green**	Doyt Perry Stadium • Bowling Green, OH	CBSSN	**WMU** 23–10	20,179	
^{#}Rankings from AP Poll released prior to game. All times are in Eastern Time.

=== Week 10 ===
Date	Time	Visiting team	Home team	Site	TV	Result	Attendance	Ref.
November 3	7:00 p.m.	**Ohio**	**Akron**	InfoCision Stadium-Summa Field • Akron, OH	ESPN2	**OHIO** 28–20	5,479	
November 3	8:00 p.m.	**Buffalo**	**Miami (OH)**	Yager Stadium • Oxford, OH	ESPN	**UB** 34–31 ^{OT}	10,618	
November 4	7:00 p.m.	**Ball State**	**UMass**	Warren McGuirk Alumni Stadium • Hadley, MA	ESPNU	**UMASS** 31–30 ^{OT}	8,881	
November 4	7:00 p.m.	**Toledo**	**Sacramento State**	Hornet Stadium • Sacramento, CA	CBSSN	**TOL** 20–17	7,928	
November 4	7:30 p.m.	**Central Michigan**	**Eastern Michigan**	Ford Field • Detroit, MI (Michigan MAC Trophy, rivalry)	ESPN2	**CMU** 35–7	12,656	
^{#}Rankings from College Football Playoff. All times are in Eastern Time.

=== Week 11 ===
Date	Time	Visiting team	Home team	Site	TV	Result	Attendance	Ref.
November 10	7:00 p.m.	Kent State	Bowling Green	Doyt Perry Stadium • Bowling Green, OH (Anniversary Award)	ESPNU	**BGSU** 33–28	10,254	
November 10	7:00 p.m.	Ohio	Miami (OH)	Yager Stadium • Oxford, OH (Battle of the Bricks)	ESPN2	**M-OH** 34–17	17,156	
November 10	7:00 p.m.	Western Michigan	Akron	InfoCision Stadium–Summa Field • Akron, OH	CBSSN	**WMU** 42–14	4,243	
November 11	7:30 p.m.	Buffalo	Ball State	Scheumann Stadium • Muncie, IN	ESPN2	**UB** 28–7	6,745	
November 11	7:30 p.m.	Sacramento State	Central Michigan	Kelly/Shorts Stadium • Mount Pleasant, MI	ESPNU	**CMU** 28–7	8,568	
November 11	7:30 p.m.	UMass	Toledo	Glass Bowl • Toledo, OH	CBSSN	**TOL** 24–0	19,137	
^{#}Rankings from College Football Playoff. All times are in Eastern Time.

=== Week 12 ===
Date	Time	Visiting team	Home team	Site	TV	Result	Attendance	Ref.
November 17	6:00 p.m.	Eastern Michigan	Western Michigan	Waldo Stadium • Kalamazoo, MI (Michigan MAC Trophy, rivalry)	ESPN2	**WMU** 34–27	10,978	
November 17	7:00 p.m.	Ball State	Ohio	Peden Stadium • Athens, OH	CBSSN	**OHIO** 35–28	12,237	
November 17	7:00 p.m.	Miami (OH)	Kent State	Dix Stadium • Kent, OH	ESPNU	**M-OH** 20–3	8,185	
November 18	7:00 p.m.	Akron	UMass	Warren McGuirk Alumni Stadium • Hadley, MA	CBSSN	**AKR** 34–33	6,698	
November 18	7:00 p.m.	Central Michigan	Buffalo	University at Buffalo Stadium • Buffalo, NY	ESPNU	**UB** 40–21	5,452	
November 20	7:30 p.m.	Bowling Green	Toledo	Glass Bowl • Toledo, OH (Battle of I-75)	ESPN2	**TOL** 19–0		
^{#}Rankings from College Football Playoff. All times are in Eastern Time.

=== Week 13 ===
Date	Time	Visiting team	Home team	Site	TV	Result	Attendance	Ref.
November 24	TBA	Kent State	**Eastern Michigan**	Rynearson Stadium • Ypsilanti, MI	TBA	–		
November 24	TBA	Miami (OH)	**Western Michigan**	Waldo Stadium • Kalamazoo, MI	TBA	–		
November 27	TBA	Buffalo	**Akron**	InfoCision Stadium–Summa Field • Akron, OH	TBA	–		
November 27	TBA	Toledo	**Ohio**	Peden Stadium • Athens, OH	TBA	–		
November 28	TBA	Sacramento State	Hawaii	Clarence T. C. Ching Athletics Complex • Honolulu, HI	TBA	–		
November 28	TBA	Central Michigan	**Ball State**	Scheumann Stadium • Muncie, IN	TBA	–		
November 28	TBA	UMass	**Bowling Green**	Doyt Perry Stadium • Bowling Green, OH	TBA	–		
^{#}Rankings from College Football Playoff. All times are in Eastern Time.

=== MAC Conference Championship Game ===
Date	Time	Visiting team	Home team	Site	TV	Result	Attendance	Ref.
December 5	12:00 p.m.	TBD	TBD	Ford Field • Detroit, MI	ESPN	–		
^{#}Rankings from College Football Playoff. All times are in Eastern Time.

== MAC records vs. other conferences ==
2026–2027 records against non-conference foes, including bowl games:

Regular season & bowls

Power Four Conferences	Record
ACC	0–3
Big 12	0–2
Big Ten	1–11
Notre Dame	0–0
SEC	0–1
Power 5 Total	1–17
Other FBS Conferences	Record
American	2–2
CUSA	1–2
Independents (Excluding Notre Dame)	1–1
Mountain West	1–4
Pac-12	1–2
Sun Belt	0–1
Other FBS Total	6–12
FCS Opponents	Record
Football Championship Subdivision	14–1
Total Non-Conference Record	21–30

=== Mid-American vs Power 4 matchups ===
This is a list of regular season games the MAC has scheduled versus power conference teams (ACC, Big Ten, Big 12, Notre Dame and SEC). All rankings are from the current AP Poll at the time of the game.

Date	Visitor	Home	Site	Score
September 3	Akron	Wake Forest	Allegacy Federal Credit Union Stadium • Winston-Salem, NC	17–38
September 3	UMass	Rutgers	SHI Stadium • Piscataway, NJ	37–21
September 5	Ball State	No. 1 Ohio State	Ohio Stadium • Columbus, OH	3–56
September 5	Miami (OH)	Pittsburgh	Acrisure Stadium • Pittsburgh, PA	14–59
September 5	Ohio	Nebraska	Memorial Stadium • Lincoln, NE	21–49
September 5	Toledo	Michigan State	Spartan Stadium • East Lansing, MI	20–30
September 5	Western Michigan	No. 16 Michigan	Michigan Stadium • Ann Arbor, MI	12–13
September 5	Kent State	South Carolina	Williams–Brice Stadium • Columbia, SC	0–57
September 12	Eastern Michigan	Michigan State	Spartan Stadium • East Lansing, MI	7–35
September 12	Bowling Green	Nebraska	Memorial Stadium • Lincoln, NE	7–56
September 19	Akron	Minnesota	Huntington Bank Stadium • Minneapolis, MN	7–41
September 19	Bowling Green	Iowa State	Jack Trice Stadium • Ames, IA	7–55
September 19	Buffalo	Penn State	Beaver Stadium • University Park, PA	13–55
September 19	Kent State	Ohio State	Ohio Stadium • Columbus, OH	3–59
September 19	Miami (OH)	Cincinnati	TQL Stadium • Cincinnati, OH	31–35
September 19	Eastern Michigan	Wisconsin	Camp Randall Stadium • Madison, WI	10–54
September 26	Central Michigan	Miami (FL)	Hard Rock Stadium • Miami Gardens, FL	3–52
October 10	Ball State	Northwestern	Martin Stadium • Evanston, IL	14–45

=== Mid-American vs other FBS matchups ===
The following regular season games include MAC teams competing against teams from the American, CUSA, Mountain West, Pac-12 or Sun Belt.

Date	Visitor	Home	Site	Score
September 4	San Jose State Spartans	Eastern Michigan	Rynearson Stadium • Ypsilanti, MI	21–27
September 5	Central Michigan	New Mexico	University Stadium, Albuquerque, NM	7–38
September 12	Buffalo	FIU	Pitbull Stadium • Miami, FL	20–33
September 12	Sacramento State	Fresno State	Valley Children's Stadium • Fresno, CA	3–49
September 12	Jacksonville State	Ohio	Peden Stadium • Athens, OH	29–27
September 19	Ball State	Liberty	Williams Stadium • Lynchburg, VA	15–51
September 19	Ohio	South Alabama	Hancock Whitney Stadium • Mobile, AL	35–41
September 19	Wyoming	Central Michigan	Kelly/Shorts Stadium • Mount Pleasant, MI	24–10
September 19	Western Michigan	Rice	Rice Stadium • Houston, TX	28–21
September 19	Temple	Toledo	Glass Bowl • Toledo, OH	49–48
September 19	North Dakota State	Sacramento State	Hornet Stadium • Sacramento, CA	10–31
September 26	San Diego State	Toledo	Glass Bowl • Toledo, OH	41–16
September 26	UNLV	Akron	InfoCision Stadium–Summa Field • Akron, OH	10–38
September 26	Boise State	Western Michigan	Waldo Stadium • Kalamazoo, MI	7–32
September 26	South Florida	Bowling Green	Doyt Perry Stadium • Bowling Green, OH	6–14
October 17	Kent State	South Florida	Doyt Perry Stadium • Bowling Green, OH	2–29
November 28	Sacramento State	Hawaii	Clarence T. C. Ching Athletics Complex • Honolulu, HI	–

=== Mid-American vs FBS independents matchups ===
The following regular season games include MAC teams competing against FBS Independents, which only includes UConn for 2026.

Date	Visitor	Home	Site	Score
September 26	UConn	Miami (OH)	Yager Stadium • Oxford, OH	24–21
October 24	UMass	UConn	Pratt & Whitney Stadium at Rentschler Field • East Hartford, CT	16–35

=== Mid-American vs. FCS matchups ===
The following regular season games include MAC teams competing against FCS schools.

Date	Visitor	Home	Site	Score
September 3	Albany	Buffalo	University at Buffalo Stadium • Buffalo, NY	21–17
September 5	Tarleton State	Bowling Green	Doyt Perry Stadium • Bowling Green, OH	13–20
September 5	Mississippi Valley State	Sacramento State	Hornet Stadium • Sacramento, CA	52–0
September 12	Colgate	Central Michigan	Kelly/Shorts Stadium • Mount Pleasant, MI	13–10
September 12	Holy Cross	Miami (OH)	Yager Stadium • Oxford, OH	45–7
September 12	Monmouth	Western Michigan	Waldo Stadium • Kalamazoo, MI	49–14
September 12	Robert Morris	Akron	InfoCision Stadium–Summa Field • Akron, OH	45–10
September 12	Stony Brook	Ball State	Scheumann Stadium • Muncie, IN	41–17
September 12	Sacred Heart	UMass	Warren McGuirk Alumni Stadium • Hadley, MA	37–10
September 12	Central Connecticut	Toledo	Glass Bowl • Toledo, OH	63–10
September 12	Jacksonville State	Kent State	Dix Stadium • Kent, OH	29–27
September 19	Stonehill	UMass	Warren McGuirk Alumni Stadium • Hadley, MA	36–14
September 26	Robert Morris	Buffalo	University at Buffalo Stadium • Buffalo, NY	31–28
September 26	Stonehill	Ohio	Peden Stadium • Athens, OH	35–7
September 26	Lindenwood	Eastern Michigan	Rynearson Stadium • Ypsilanti, MI	29–3

== Head to head matchups ==
2026 MAC Head to head
Team	Akron	Ball State	Bowling Green	Buffalo	Central Michigan	Eastern Michigan	Kent State	Miami (OH)	Ohio	Toledo	Sacramento State	UMass	Western Michigan
Akron	—	—	—	–	17–41	23–25	20–35	14–34	20–28	—	—	34–33	14–42
Ball State	—	—	32–31	7–28	–	—	13–26	—	28–35	24–39	34–17	30–31	—
Bowling Green	—	31–32	—	24–31	—	—	33–28	24–20	—	0–19	38–10	–	10–23
Buffalo	–	28–7	31–24	—	40–21	—	—	34–31	—	23–8	—	25–18	17–20
Central Michigan	41–17	–	—	21–40	—	35–7	—	27–28	14–31	—	28–7	—	14– 21
Eastern Michigan	25–23	—	—	—	7–35	—	–	—	20–24	14–34	28–17	38–14	27–34
Kent State	35–20	26–13	28–33	—	—	–	—	3–20	10–13	—	10–31	—	7–38
Miami (OH)	34–14	—	20–24	31–34	28–27	—	20–3	—	34–17	—	—	20–19	–
Ohio	28–20	35–28	—	—	31–14	24–20	13–10	17–34	—	–	48–7	—	—
Toledo	—	39–24	19–0	8–23	—	34–14	—	—	–	—	20–17	24–0	45–38
Sacramento State	—	17–34	10–38	—	7–28	17–28	31–10	—	7–48	17–20	—	6–35	—
UMass	33–34	31–30	–	18–25	—	14–38	—	19–20	—	0–24	35–6	—	—
Western Michigan	42–14	—	23–10	20–17	21–14	34–27	38–7	–	—	38–45	—	—	—

Updated through - November 20, 2026

== Awards and honors ==
=== Player of the week honors ===
Week	Offensive			Defensive			Special Teams		
Week	Player	Team	Position	Player	Team	Position	Player	Team	Position
Week 0	Noah Kim	Eastern Michigan	QB	Zach Mowchan	Eastern Michigan	LB	Nick Devereaux	Eastern Michigan	WR/KR
Week 1	Pop Watson	UMass	QB	Jahmad Harmon	UMass	S	Derek Morris	UMass	K
Week 2	Keldric Luster	Ball State	QB	Domanick Moon	Western Michigan	LB	T. Y. Harding	UMass	WR/PR
Week 3	John Alan Richter	Toledo	QB	William DePaepe	UMass	DL	Derek Morris (2)	UMass	K
Week 4	Bryson Hammer	Toledo	WR	Myles Bradley	Bowling Green	DE	Sean Leonard	Kent State	K
Week 5	CJ Miller	Toledo	RB	Eriq George	Bowling Green	DL	Kellan McLaughlin	Miami	K
Week 6	Broc Lowry	Western Michigan	QB	Michael Molnar	Ohio	LB	Rudy Kessinger	Eastern Michigan	K
Week 7	Keldric Luster (2)	Ball State	QB	Andrew Zock	Toledo	DE	Oliver Hautanen	Buffalo	K
Week 8	Dru DeShields; Messiah Burch	Kent State; Buffalo	QB; RB	Michael Molnar (2)	Ohio	LB	Darren James-Hamilton	Ohio	S/KR/PR
Week 9	Isaiah Ene	Sacramento State	RB	Fata Puloka	Sacramento State	LB	Ryan Millmore	Western Michigan	P
Week 10	Chance Morrow; Pop Watson (2)	Buffalo; UMass	WR; QB	Michael Molnar (3)	Ohio	LB	Markus Meincke	Toledo	P
Week 11	Messiah Burch	Buffalo	RB	Myles Bradley (2)	Bowling Green	DE	Ryan Kingston	Bowling Green	P
Week 12									
Week 13									
