= 2026 Sacramento State Hornets football team =

American college football season

2026 Sacramento State Hornets football
- Conference: Mid-American Conference
- Record: 2–9 (1–7 MAC)
- Head coach: Alonzo Carter (1st season)
- Offensive coordinator: Eric Kiesau (1st season)
- Co-offensive coordinator: Eric Scott (1st season)
- Offensive scheme: Spread
- Defensive coordinator: Adam Clark (1st season)
- Co-defensive coordinator: Kenwick Thompson (1st season)
- Base defense: 3–3–5
- Home stadium: Hornet Stadium

2026 Mid-American Conference football standings
	Conf.			Overall
Team	W		L	W		L
Toledo	5	–	1	8	–	2
Ohio	5	–	1	7	–	3
Western Michigan	5	–	1	7	–	3
Buffalo	5	–	1	7	–	3
Miami (OH)	4	–	2	6	–	4
Central Michigan	3	–	3	5	–	5
Eastern Michigan	3	–	3	4	–	6
Bowling Green	3	–	3	3	–	7
UMass	2	–	4	5	–	5
Kent State	2	–	4	3	–	7
Ball State	2	–	4	3	–	7
Sacramento State	1	–	7	2	–	9
Akron	0	–	6	1	–	9
Championship: December 5, 2026
As of November 13, 2026; Rankings from AP poll

The 2026 Sacramento State Hornets football team represents California State University, Sacramento during the 2026 NCAA Division I FBS football season as a member of the Mid-American Conference (MAC). They are led by Alonzo Carter in his first season as head coach and play their home games at Hornet Stadium in Sacramento, California. This is their first year in FBS after 33 years in the FCS between from 1993 to 2025.

A realignment to the FBS was announced in 2025, but the NCAA Football Oversight Committee denied a recommendation ahead of a Division I Council vote. The vote later officially denied the waiver. In February 2026, it was announced that the Hornets would join the Mid-American Conference (MAC) at the FBS level as a football-only member beginning with the 2026 season.

== Offseason ==
=== Transfers ===
==== Outgoing ====
Player	Position	Destination
Adam Johnston	LS	Arkansas
Gavin Nelson	TE	Cal Poly
Dontae Robinson	TE	Central Michigan
Damian Henderson II	RB	Colorado
Jaquail Smith	RB	Colorado
Ernest Campbell	WR	Colorado
Jose Soto	OL	Colorado
Micah Mosley	OLB	Fresno State
Dylan Hampsten	DL	Fresno State
Cardell Williams	QB	Maryland
Ricky Lee III	CB	Middle Tennessee
Jaden Rashada	QB	Mississippi State
James Gillespie	DL	Nevada
Bear Tenney	TE	New Mexico
Koa Akui	S	Rice
Jason Oliver	CB	San Diego State
Jordan Anderson	WR	San Jose State
Jayland McGlothen	DL	San Jose State
Anta'Veon McKenzie	S	UAB
DeSean Watts	DT	Washington

=== Incoming ===
Player	Position	Previous school
Nikko Klemm	S	Arizona State
Noah King	CB	Colorado
Nick Dimitris	DL	Florida A&M
Carson Conklin	QB	Fresno State
Isiah Chala Jr.	DE	Fresno State
Tim Thomas	LB	Fresno State
Kyle Koontz	TE	Houston Christian
Raiden Brown	WR	Idaho State
Jackson Sharman	QB	Idaho State
Donovan Turner	CB	Illinois
Darson Jeanty	LB	Lafayette
Amari Wallace	CB	Miami (FL)
Qualyn McQueen	CB	Nebraska–Kearney
Jaylen Patterson	QB	New Mexico State
Ivan Moore Jr.	DE	Northern Illinois
Elijah Washington	WR	Oregon State
Dionte Thorton	DB	Portland State
Malikai Nichols	CB	Saint Francis
Cincere Rhaney	RB	San Diego State
Matthew Coleman	WR	San Jose State
Boogsie Silvera	S	South Florida
Jay Brockhaus	P	Southeastern
Cedric Anton	TE	Tiffin
Garrison Blank	OT	UCLA
Will Weber	DL	UTEP
Vae Soifua	OL	Weber State
Davion Godley	RB	Weber State
Jamel Howard Jr.	DL	Wisconsin

=== Coaching staff additions ===
Name	New Position	Previous Team	Previous Position	Source
Alonzo Carter	Head coach	Arizona	Assistant head coach/Running backs	
Eric Kiesau	Offensive coordinator	Florida	Offensive quality control	
Adam Clark	Defensive coordinator	Northern Arizona	Defensive coordinator	
Milo Austin	Special teams coordinator	Elon	Special teams coordinator	
Angus McClure	Associate head coach/Offensive line	Kansas	Offensive analyst	
Kenwick Thompson	Assistant head coach/Co-defensive coordinator/Linebackers	Florida A&M	Defensive coordinator/Linebackers	
Nick Alaimalo	Running backs/Co-special teams coordinator	Washington State	Assistant wide receivers coach	
Robert Conley	Tight ends	Weber State	Run game coordinator/Tight ends	
Dakari Monroe	Cornerbacks	Arizona	Defensive graduate assistant	
Eric Scott	Co-offensive coordinator/Wide receivers	West Los Angeles JC	Head coach	
Manako Tuifua	Defensive line	Northern Arizona	Defensive line	

== Schedule ==
Date	Time	Opponent	Site	TV	Result	Attendance
August 29	3:30 p.m.	at Eastern Michigan	Rynearson Stadium; Ypsilanti, MI	ESPN+	L 17–28	9,401
September 5	7:00 p.m.	Mississippi Valley State*	Hornet Stadium; Sacramento, CA	ESPN+	W 52–0	18,523
September 12	7:30 p.m.	at Fresno State*	Valley Children's Stadium; Fresno, CA	CBSSN	L 3–49	40,198
September 19	7:30 p.m.	North Dakota State*	Hornet Stadium; Sacramento, CA	ESPN	L 10–31	13,322
September 26	6:00 p.m.	UMass	Hornet Stadium; Sacramento, CA	ESPN+	L 6–35	11,007
October 10	9:00 a.m.	at Bowling Green	Doyt Perry Stadium; Bowling Green, OH	ESPN+	L 10–38	12,559
October 17	7:00 p.m.	Ohio	Hornet Stadium; Sacramento, CA	ESPN+	L 7–48	17,661
October 24	12:30 p.m.	at Ball State	Scheumann Stadium; Muncie, IN	ESPN+	L 17–34	12,518
October 30	7:30 p.m.	Kent State	Hornet Stadium; Sacramento, CA	ESPN2	W 31–10	9,931
November 4	4:00 p.m.	Toledo	Hornet Stadium; Sacramento, CA	CBSSN	L 17–20	7,928
November 11	4:30 p.m.	at Central Michigan	Kelly/Shorts Stadium; Mount Pleasant, MI	ESPNU	L 7–28	8,568
November 28	9:00 p.m.	at Hawaii*	Clarence T.C. Ching Athletics Complex; Honolulu, HI	MW+		
*Non-conference game; All times are in Pacific time

== Roster ==
2026 Sacramento State Hornets football team roster
Players
Coaches
Offense

Pos.	#	Name	Class
RB	1	Jamar Curtis	Sr
QB	17	Carson Conklin	Jr
QB	8	Jackson Sharman	Jr

Defense

Pos.	#	Name	Class
S	0	Donovan Turner	Sr

Special teams

Pos.	#	Name	Class

Head coach

- Alonzo Carter

Coordinators/assistant coaches

- Eric Kiesau (Offensive coordinator)
- Adam Clark (Defensive coordinator)
- Milo Austin (Special teams coordinator)
- Angus McClure (Associate head coach/Offensive line)
- Kenwick Thompson (Assistant head coach/Co-defensive coordinator/Linebackers)
- Nick Alaimalo (Running backs/Co-special teams coordinator)
- Robert Conley (Tight ends)
- Dakari Monroe (Cornerbacks)
- Eric Scott (Co-offensive coordinator/Wide receivers)
- Manako Tuifua (Defensive line)

Legend

- (C) Team captain
- (S) Suspended
- (I) Ineligible
- Injured
- Redshirt

Roster

== Game summaries ==
=== at Eastern Michigan ===
Sacramento State Hornets (0–0) at Eastern Michigan Eagles (0–0) – Game summary

Quarter	1	2	3	4	Total
Hornets	0	10	0	7	17
Eagles	0	21	0	7	28

at Rynearson Stadium • Ypsilanti, Michigan

- Date: August 29
- Game time: 3:30 pm PDT
- Game weather: Sunny • Temperature: 82 °F (28 °C) • Wind: SW at 2 miles per hour (3.2 km/h)
- Game attendance: 9,401
- Referee: Matt Packowski
- TV announcers (ESPN+): Mick Tidrow and Je'Rod Cherry

Game information

First quarter

- No scoring plays.

Second quarter

- EMU – Noah Kim 5-yard run (Rudy Kessinger kick), 14:20. Eagles 7–0. Drive: 9 plays, 79 yards, 4:09.
- SAC– Grant Meadors 40-yard field goal, 9:24. Eagles 7–3. Drive: 7 plays, 6 yards, 2:44.
- EMU – Santonyo Issac 40-yard pass from Noah Kim (Rudy Kessinger kick), 7:50. Eagles 14–3. Drive: 3 plays, 74 yards, 1:27.
- EMU – Braydon Bennett 7-yard run (Rudy Kessinger kick), 5:07. Eagles 21–3. Drive: 3 plays, 15 yards, 1:35.
- SAC – Xavier Williams 29-yard fumble return, (Grant Meadors kick), 0:54. Eagles 21–10. Drive: 6 plays, 18 yards, 2:12

Third quarter

- No scoring plays.

Fourth quarter

- EMU – Nick Devereaux 31-yard pass from Noah Kim (Rudy Kessinger kick), 13:31. Eagles 28–10. Drive: 6 plays, 61 yards, 2:42.
- SAC – Isaiah Ene 1-yard run (Grant Meadors kick), 8:23. Eagles 28-17. Drive: 10 plays, 75 yards, 5:08.

Statistics	SAC	EMU
First downs	13	21
Plays–yards	63–270	68–348
Rushes–yards	17–49	30–69
Passing yards	221	279
Passing: comp–att–int	25–46–1	27–38–0
Turnovers	2	1
Time of possession	27:32	32:28

Team	Category	Player	Statistics
Sacramento State	Passing	Carson Conklin	25/46, 221 yards, INT
Sacramento State	Rushing	Isaiah Ene	3 carries, 47 yards, TD
Sacramento State	Receiving	Onterrio Smith Jr.	9 receptions, 88 yards
Eastern Michigan	Passing	Noah Kim	27/38, 279 yards, 2 TD
Eastern Michigan	Rushing	Amareon Blue	12 carries, 55 yards
Eastern Michigan	Receiving	Benson Prosper	7 receptions, 81 yards

=== Mississippi Valley State (FCS) ===
Mississippi Valley State Delta Devils (FCS) (0–1) at Sacramento State Hornets (0–1) – Game summary

Quarter	1	2	3	4	Total
Delta Devils (FCS)	0	0	0	0	0
Hornets	14	17	7	14	52

at Hornet Stadium • Sacramento, California

- Date: September 5
- Game time: 7:00 p.m.
- Game weather: Sunny
- Game attendance: 18,523
- Referee: Chris LaMange
- TV announcers (ESPN+): Will Iger and Mo Hasan

Game information

First quarter

- SAC – Matt Coleman 5-yard pass from Jackson Sharman (Grant Meadors kick), 10:52. Hornets 7–0. Drive: 3 plays, 9 yards, 1:25.
- SAC – Jamar Curtis 1-yard run (Grant Meadors kick), 0:59. Hornets 14–0. Drive: 4 plays, 60 yards, 2:09.

Second quarter

- SAC – Grant Meadors 25-yard field goal, 11:10. Hornets 17–0. Drive: 9 plays, 41 yards, 4:03.
- SAC – Matt Coleman 19-yard pass from Jackson Sharman (Grant Meadors kick), 8:48. Hornets 24–0. Drive: 4 plays, 46 yards, 2:20.
- SAC – Jace Wilson 24-yard pass from Jackson Sharman (Grant Meadors kick), 0:28. Hornets 31–0. Drive: 9 plays, 62 yards, 1:27.

Third quarter

- SAC – Matt Coleman 63-yard pass from Jackson Sharman (Grant Meadors kick), 2:00. Hornets 38–0. Drive: 9 plays, 99 yards, 3:13.

Fourth quarter

- SAC – Jaylen Patterson 43-yard run (Grant Meadors kick), 12:07. Hornets 45–0. Drive: 3 plays, 58 yards, 1:28.
- SAC – Daniel Swinney 3-yard run (Saul Marks kick), 3:21. Hornets 52–0. Drive: 2 plays, 18 yards, 0:44.

Statistics	MVSU	SAC
First downs	6	26
Plays–yards	53–147	70–453
Rushes–yards	34–104	41–203
Passing yards	43	250
Passing: comp–att–int	9–19–0	19–29–1
Turnovers	1	2
Time of possession	26:52	33:08

Team	Category	Player	Statistics
Mississippi Valley State	Passing	Jordon Davis	3/6, 24 yards
Mississippi Valley State	Rushing	Dezmond Ray	3 carries, 36 yards
Mississippi Valley State	Receiving	Jackson Hampton	1 reception, 18 yards
Sacramento State	Passing	Jackson Sharman	18/28, 247 yards, 4 TD, INT
Sacramento State	Rushing	Daniel Swinney	8 carries, 58 yards, TD
Sacramento State	Receiving	Matt Coleman	6 receptions, 141 yards, 3 TD

=== at Fresno State ===
Sacramento State Hornets (1–1) at Fresno State Bulldogs (0–1) – Game summary

Quarter	1	2	3	4	Total
Hornets	0	0	3	0	3
Bulldogs	0	32	14	3	49

at Valley Children's Stadium • Fresno, California

- Date: September 12
- Game time: 7:30 p.m.
- Game weather: Clear • Temperature: 90 °F (32 °C) • Wind: NW at 11 miles per hour (18 km/h)
- Game attendance: 40,198
- Referee: Chris Wiggins
- TV announcers (CBSSN): Chris Lewis and Randy Cross

Game information

First quarter

- No scoring plays.

Second quarter

- FRES – Rayshon Luke 18-yard pass from Jayden Mandal (Manaki Watanabe kick), 14:53. Bulldogs 7–0. Drive: 5 plays, 54 yards, 1:54.
- FRES – Ezekiel Avit 73-yard pass from Jayden Mandal (Jayden Mandal–Gavin Correia pass), 11:58. Bulldogs 15–0. Drive: 1 play, 73 yards, 0:11.
- FRES – Jayden Mandal 1-yard run (Manaki Watanabe kick), 6:19. Bulldogs 22–0. Drive: 8 plays, 58 yards, 4:16.
- FRES – Bryson Donelson 11-yard run (Manaki Watanabe kick), 1:28. Bulldogs 29–0. Drive: 8 plays, 63 yards, 3:47.
- FRES – Manaki Watanabe 51-yard field goal, 0:00. Bulldogs 32–0. Drive: 6 plays, 25 yards, 0:28.

Third quarter

- FRES – Bryson Donelson 5-yard run (Manaki Watanabe kick), 9:02. Bulldogs 39–0. Drive: 6 plays, 55 yards, 2:55.
- SAC – Grant Meadors 35-yard field goal, 4:50. Bulldogs 39–3. Drive: 9 plays, 58 yards, 4:12.
- FRES – Bryson Donelson 56-yard run (Manaki Watanabe kick), 2:43. Bulldogs 46–3. Drive: 4 plays, 75 yards, 2:07.

Fourth quarter

- FRES – Manake Watanabe 28-yard field goal, 7:09. Bulldogs 49–3. Drive: 10 plays, 69 yards, 5:53.

Statistics	SAC	FRES
First downs	16	26
Plays–yards	65–262	63–542
Rushes–yards	34–112	33–193
Passing yards	150	349
Passing: comp–att–int	15–31–1	26–30–0
Turnovers	1	0
Time of possession	28:47	31:13

Team	Category	Player	Statistics
Sacramento State	Passing	Jackson Sharman	15/31, 150 yards, INT
Sacramento State	Rushing	Jamar Curtis	9 carries, 48 yards
Sacramento State	Receiving	Onterrio Smith Jr.	4 receptions, 66 yards
Fresno State	Passing	Jayden Mandal	23/26, 316 yards, 2 TD
Fresno State	Rushing	Bryson Donelson	13 carries, 102 yards, 3 TD
Fresno State	Receiving	Ezekiel Avit	2 receptions, 103 yards, TD

=== North Dakota State ===
North Dakota State Bison (3–0) at Sacramento State Hornets (1–2) – Game summary

Quarter	1	2	3	4	Total
Bison	21	7	0	3	31
Hornets	0	3	0	7	10

at Hornet Stadium • Sacramento, California

- Date: September 19
- Game time: 7:30 p.m.
- Game weather: Sunny • Temperature: 81 °F (27 °C) • Wind: SW at 3 miles per hour (4.8 km/h)
- Game attendance: 13,322
- Referee: Rich Edwards
- TV announcers (ESPN): Lowell Galindo, Kirk Morrison and Dawn Davenport

Game information

First quarter

- (13:37) NDSU – Jackson Williams 33-yard pass from Nathan Hayes, Drew Klein kick (Drive: 5 plays, 75 yards, 1:23; North Dakota State 7–0)
- (11:49) NDSU – Darius Givance 24-yard fumble recovery, Drew Klein kick (North Dakota State 14–0)
- (0:04) NDSU – Myles Mitchell 9-yard run, Drew Klein kick (Drive: 4 plays, 49 yards, 1:50; North Dakota State 21–0)

Second quarter

- (11:24) NDSU – DJ Scott 42-yard run, Drew Klein kick (Drive: 5 plays, 62 yards, 2:44; North Dakota State 28–0)
- (6:52) SAC – Grant Meadors 25-yard field goal (Drive: 9 plays, 63 yards, 4:32; North Dakota State 28–3)

Third quarter

No scoring plays

Fourth quarter

- (12:00) NDSU – Drew Klein 29-yard field goal (Drive: 12 plays, 53 yards, 7:03; North Dakota State 31–3)
- (8:05) SAC – Onterrio Smith Jr. 21-yard pass from Jackson Sharman, Grant Meadors kick (Drive: 7 plays, 80 yards, 3:55; North Dakota State 31–10)

Statistics	NDSU	SAC
First downs	17	20
Plays–yards	59–362	67–328
Rushes–yards	34–152	26–90
Passing yards	210	238
Passing: comp–att–int	14–25–0	25–41–2
Turnovers	0	3
Time of possession	30:30	29:30

Team	Category	Player	Statistics
North Dakota State	Passing	Nathan Hayes	14/24, 210 yards, TD
North Dakota State	Rushing	DJ Scott	14 carries, 80 yards, TD
North Dakota State	Receiving	Jackson Williams	7 receptions, 134 yards, TD
Sacramento State	Passing	Jackson Sharman	25/41, 238 yards, TD, 2 INT
Sacramento State	Rushing	Cincere Rhaney	9 carries, 38 yards
Sacramento State	Receiving	Matthew Coleman	8 receptions, 95 yards

=== UMass ===
UMass Minutemen (3-0) at Sacramento State Hornets (1-3) – Game summary

Quarter	1	2	3	4	Total
Minutemen	7	14	14	0	35
Hornets	0	6	0	0	6

at Hornet Stadium • Sacramento, California

- Date: September 26
- Game time: 6:00 p.m. PDT
- Game weather: Sunny • Temperature: 80 °F (27 °C) • Wind: SW 4 MPH
- Game attendance: 11,007
- Referee: Billy Williams
- TV announcers (ESPN+): Will Iger and Mo Hasan

Game information

First quarter

- MASS – Pop Watson 13-yard run (Derek Morris kick), 11:48. Minutemen 7–0. Drive: 6 plays, 75 yards, 3:12.

Second quarter

- SAC – Grant Meadors 20-yard field goal, 14:48. Minutemen 7–3. Drive: 16 plays, 76 yards, 7:23.
- MASS – Pop Watson 32-yard run (Derek Morris kick), 10:27. Minutemen 14–3. Drive: 8 plays, 75 yards, 4:21.
- SAC – Grant Meadors 29-yard field goal, 3:46. Minutemen 14–6. Drive: 4 plays, 2 yards, 0:55.
- MASS – Max Dowling 7-yard pass from Pop Watson (Derek Morris kick), 1:45. Minutemen 21–6. Drive: 6 plays, 75 yards, 2:01.

Third quarter

- MASS – Timmy Hinspeter 49-yard interception return (Derek Morris kick), 13:31. Minutemen 28–6.

Fourth quarter

- MASS – Kezion Dia-Johnson 3-yard run (Derek Morris kick), 2:27. Minutemen 35–6. Drive: 8 plays, 43 yards, 4:25.

Statistics	MASS	SAC
First downs	16	23
Plays–yards	53–333	77–323
Rushes–yards	37–232	34–102
Passing yards	101	221
Passing: comp–att–int	11–16–0	24–43–1
Turnovers	0	3
Time of possession	28:08	31:52

Team	Category	Player	Statistics
UMass	Passing	Pop Watson	11/16, 101 yards, TD
UMass	Rushing	Pop Watson	7 carries, 72 yards, 2 TD
UMass	Receiving	T. Y. Harding	3 receptions, 44 yards
Sacramento State	Passing	Jackson Sharman	24/43, 221 yards, INT
Sacramento State	Rushing	Daniel Swinney	9 carries, 35 yards
Sacramento State	Receiving	Raiden Brown	6 receptions, 61 yards

=== at Bowling Green ===
Sacramento State Hornets (1-4) at Bowling Green Falcons (1-4) – Game summary

Quarter	1	2	3	4	Total
Hornets	-	-	-	-	0
Falcons	-	-	-	-	0

at Doyt Perry Stadium • Bowling Green, Ohio

- Date: October 10
- Game time: 9:00 a.m. PDT

Statistics	SAC	BGSU
First downs		
Plays–yards		
Rushes–yards		
Passing yards		
Passing: comp–att–int		
Turnovers		
Time of possession		

Team	Category	Player	Statistics
Sacramento State	Passing		
Sacramento State	Rushing		
Sacramento State	Receiving		
Bowling Green	Passing		
Bowling Green	Rushing		
Bowling Green	Receiving		

=== Ohio ===
Ohio Bobcats (4–2) at Sacramento State Hornets (1–5) – Game summary

Quarter	1	2	3	4	Total
Bobcats	7	20	14	7	48
Hornets	0	0	0	7	7

at Hornet Stadium • Sacramento, California

- Date: October 17
- Game time: 7:00 p.m. PDT
- Game weather: Sunny, Temperature:68 °F (20 °C), Wind: NW 3 mph (4.8 km/h)
- Game attendance: 17,661
- Referee: Rick Warne
- TV announcers (ESPN+): Chris Sylvester (play-by-play) and Doc Holliday (analyst)

Game information

First quarter

- (05:35) OHIO – Duncan Brune 3-yard run (Will Hryszko kick) (Drive: 11 plays, 82 yards, 5:58, Ohio 7–0)

Second quarter

- (14:56) OHIO - Will Hryszko 50-yard field goal (Drive: 7 plays, 45 yards, 3:03, Ohio 10–0)
- (09:35) OHIO – Victor Rosa 16-yard run (Will Hryszko kick) (Drive: 4 plays, 71 yards, 2:10, Ohio 17–0)
- (07:54) OHIO - Will Hryszko 37-yard field goal (Drive: 4 plays, 7 yards, 1:31, Ohio 20–0)
- (01:50) OHIO – Duncan Brune 14-yard run (Will Hryszko kick) (Drive: 10 plays, 76 yards, 4:39, Ohio 27–0)

Third quarter

- (05:24) OHIO – Preston Bowman 67-yard pass from Nick Poulos (Will Hryszko kick) (Drive: 4 plays, 84 yards, 2:02; Ohio 34–0)
- (00:45) OHIO – Levi Davis 14-yard run (Will Hryszko kick) (Drive: 9 plays, 71 yards, 4:55, Ohio 41–0)

Fourth quarter

- (12:24) SAC – Kenyon Shabazz 67-yard pass from Brian Salazar Jr. (Grant Meadors kick) (Drive: 6 plays, 75 yards, 3:21; Ohio 41–7)
- (03:07) OHIO – Irving Brown 2-yard run (Will Hryszko kick) (Drive: 9 plays, 82 yards, 5:12, Ohio 48–7)

Statistics	OHIO	SAC
First downs	30	13
Total yards	64–468	52–267
Rushing yards	42–265	26–127
Passing yards	203	140
Passing: comp–att–int	15–22–0	15–26–1
Turnovers	0	1
Time of possession	33:11	26:49

Team	Category	Player	Statistics
Ohio	Passing	Nick Poulos	11/14, 165 yards, TD
Ohio	Rushing	Irving Brown	8 carries, 87 yards, TD
Ohio	Receiving	Preston Bowman	3 receptions, 94 yards, TD
Sacramento State	Passing	Brian Salazar Jr.	4/5, 71 yards, TD
Sacramento State	Rushing	Isaiah Ene	7 carries, 59 yards
Sacramento State	Receiving	Kenyon Shabazz	2 receptions, 46 yards, TD

=== at Ball State ===
Sacramento State Hornets (1-6) at Ball State Cardinals (2-5) – Game summary

Quarter	1	2	3	4	Total
Hornets	-	-	-	-	0
Cardinals	-	-	-	-	0

at Scheumann Stadium • Muncie, Indiana

- Date: October 24

Statistics	SAC	BALL
First downs		
Plays–yards		
Rushes–yards		
Passing yards		
Passing: comp–att–int		
Turnovers		
Time of possession		

Team	Category	Player	Statistics
Sacramento State	Passing		
Sacramento State	Rushing		
Sacramento State	Receiving		
Ball State	Passing		
Ball State	Rushing		
Ball State	Receiving		

=== Kent State ===
Kent State Golden Flashes (3–5) at Sacramento State Hornets (1–7) – Game summary

Quarter	1	2	3	4	Total
Golden Flashes	0	0	0	0	0
Hornets	0	0	0	0	0

at Hornet Stadium • Sacramento, California

- Date: October 30

Game information

First quarter
Second quarter
Third quarter
Fourth quarter

Statistics	KENT	SAC
First downs		
Plays–yards		
Rushes–yards		
Passing yards		
Passing: comp–att–int		
Turnovers		
Time of possession		

Team	Category	Player	Statistics
Kent State	Passing		
Kent State	Rushing		
Kent State	Receiving		
Sacramento State	Passing		
Sacramento State	Rushing		
Sacramento State	Receiving		

=== Toledo ===
Toledo Rockets (6–2) at Sacramento State Hornets (2–7) – Game summary

Quarter	1	2	3	4	Total
Rockets	0	0	0	0	0
Hornets	0	0	0	0	0

at Hornet Stadium • Sacramento, California

- Date: November 4

Game information

First quarter
Second quarter
Third quarter
Fourth quarter

Statistics	TOL	SAC
First downs		
Plays–yards		
Rushes–yards		
Passing yards		
Passing: comp–att–int		
Turnovers		
Time of possession		

Team	Category	Player	Statistics
Toledo	Passing		
Toledo	Rushing		
Toledo	Receiving		
Sacramento State	Passing		
Sacramento State	Rushing		
Sacramento State	Receiving		

=== at Central Michigan ===
Sacramento State Hornets (2–8) at Central Michigan Chippewas (4–5) – Game summary

Quarter	1	2	3	4	Total
Hornets	0	0	0	0	0
Chippewas	0	0	0	0	0

at Kelly/Shorts Stadium • Mount Pleasant, Michigan

- Date: November 11

Game information

First quarter

Second quarter

Third quarter

Fourth quarter

Statistics	SAC	CMU
First downs		
Plays–yards		
Rushes–yards		
Passing yards		
Passing: comp–att–int		
Turnovers		
Time of possession		

Team	Category	Player	Statistics
Sacramento State	Passing		
Sacramento State	Rushing		
Sacramento State	Receiving		
Central Michigan	Passing		
Central Michigan	Rushing		
Central Michigan	Receiving		

=== at Hawaii ===
Sacramento State Hornets (2–9) at Hawaii Rainbow Warriors (0–0) – Game summary

Quarter	1	2	3	4	Total
Hornets	0	0	0	0	0
Rainbow Warriors	0	0	0	0	0

at Clarence T. C. Ching Athletics Complex • Honolulu, Hawaii

- Date: November 28
- Game time: 8:00 p.m.

Game information

First quarter

Second quarter

Third quarter

Fourth quarter

Statistics	SAC	HAW
First downs		
Plays–yards		
Rushes–yards		
Passing yards		
Passing: comp–att–int		
Turnovers		
Time of possession		

Team	Category	Player	Statistics
Sacramento State	Passing		
Sacramento State	Rushing		
Sacramento State	Receiving		
Hawaii	Passing		
Hawaii	Rushing		
Hawaii	Receiving		
