= Eric Kiesau =

American football player and coach (born 1972)

Current position
- Title: Offensive coordinator
- Team: Sacramento State
- Conference: MAC

Biographical details
- Born: November 24, 1972 (age 53); Pasadena, California, U.S.
- Education: Portland State University (1996)

Playing career
- 1991–1992: Glendale (CA)
- 1995: Portland State
- Position: Quarterback

Coaching career (HC unless noted)
- 2000: Utah State (RB)
- 2001: Utah State (WR)
- 2002–2005: California (WR)
- 2006–2008: Colorado (WR)
- 2009–2010: Colorado (OC)
- 2011: California (PGC/WR)
- 2012–2013: Washington (OC)
- 2014: Kansas (WR/interim OC)
- 2015: Alabama (OA)
- 2016: Fresno State (AHC/OC)
- 2016: Fresno State (interim HC)
- 2017–2018: Boise State (WR)
- 2019: Boise State (co-OC/WR)
- 2020: Boise State (OC/QB)
- 2021: Auburn (PGC/WR)
- 2022: Auburn (OC/QB)
- 2023–2025: Florida (OQC)
- 2026–present: Sacramento State (OC)

Head coaching record
- Overall: 0–4

Eric Kiesau (born November 24, 1972) is an American college football coach who is currently the offensive coordinator at California State University, Sacramento (Sacramento State). Kiesau previously served as the offensive quality control coach at the University of Florida from 2023 to 2025 and as the offensive coordinator at Auburn University in 2022. He played college football as a quarterback at Glendale Community College from 1991 to 1992 and Portland State in 1995.

== Coaching career ==
=== Early career ===
In 2000, Kiesau began his coaching career as the running backs coach at Utah State University under head coach Mick Dennehy. In 2001, he was promoted to wide receivers coach. In 2002, Kiesau joined the University of California, Berkeley as their wide receivers coach.

=== Colorado ===
In 2006, Kiesau was hired as the wide receivers coach at the University of Colorado Boulder under head coach Dan Hawkins. In 2009, he was promoted to offensive coordinator. Following the firing of Hawkins, Kiesau was not retained by the Buffaloes.

=== California ===
In 2011, Kiesau joined the University of California, Berkeley as their passing game coordinator and wide receivers coach.

=== Washington ===
In 2012, Kiesau was hired as the offensive coordinator at the University of Washington under head coach Steve Sarkisian.

=== Kansas ===
In 2014, Kiesau joined the University of Kansas as their wide receivers coach under head coach Charlie Weis. On September 28, 2014, Weis was fired and on November 1, 2014, Kiesau was promoted to co-offensive coordinator by interim head coach Clint Bowen.

=== Alabama ===
In 2015, Kiesau was named an offensive analyst at the University of Alabama under head coach Nick Saban.

=== Fresno State ===
On December 31, 2015, Kiesau was hired as the assistant head coach and offensive coordinator at California State University, Fresno (Fresno State) under head coach Tim DeRuyter. On October 23, 2016, Kiesau was named the interim head coach of the Bulldogs, following the firing of DeRuyter. In the final four games of the 2016 season, they went 0–4.

=== Boise State ===
In 2017, Kiesau joined Boise State University as their wide receivers coach under head coach Bryan Harsin. In 2019, he was promoted to co-offensive coordinator and wide receivers coach. In 2020, Kiesau was named the offensive coordinator and quarterbacks coach for the Broncos.

=== Auburn ===
On February 19, 2021, Kiesau followed Bryan Harsin to Auburn as an offensive analyst. Due to the firing of Cornelius Williams after four games, Kiesau was promoted to wide receivers coach. After forty-five days of Austin Davis as offensive coordinator, Kiesau took over the quarterbacks coach/offensive coordinator duties in 2022. Auburn fired Kiesau on October 31, 2022, along with Harsin and several other staffers.

=== Florida ===
In 2023, Kiesau was hired as an offensive quality control coach at the University of Florida under head coach Billy Napier.

=== Sacramento State ===
On December 30, 2025, Kiesau was hired to serve as the offensive coordinator at California State University, Sacramento (Sacramento State) under head coach Alonzo Carter.

== Personal life ==
Kiesau has two children, a son and a daughter.

== Head coaching record ==
Year	Team	Overall	Conference	Standing	Bowl/playoffs
Fresno State Bulldogs (Mountain West Conference) (2016)
2016	Fresno State	0–4 (Note: Tim DeRuyter was fired as head coach on October 23, 2016 and replaced with Kiesau as interim head coach. Fresno State finished the season with an overall record of 1–11 and a conference mark of 0–8.)	0–4	6th (West)	
Fresno State:		0–4	0–4		
Total:		0–4			
