= 2026 Toledo Rockets football team =

American college football season

2026 Toledo Rockets football
- Conference: Mid-American Conference
- Record: 9–2 (6–1 MAC)
- Head coach: Mike Jacobs (1st season)
- Co-offensive coordinator: Cris Reisert (1st season)
- Offensive scheme: Spread / run-pass option
- Defensive coordinator: Jahmal Brown (1st season)
- Base defense: 4–2–5
- Home stadium: Glass Bowl

2026 Mid-American Conference football standings
| | Conf. | | | Overall |
| Team | W | | L | W | | L |
|---|---|---|---|---|---|---|
| Ohio | 6 | – | 1 | 8 | – | 3 |
| Western Michigan | 6 | – | 1 | 8 | – | 3 |
| Buffalo | 6 | – | 1 | 8 | – | 3 |
| Toledo | 6 | – | 1 | 9 | – | 2 |
| Miami (OH) | 5 | – | 2 | 7 | – | 4 |
| Central Michigan | 3 | – | 4 | 5 | – | 6 |
| Eastern Michigan | 3 | – | 4 | 4 | – | 7 |
| Bowling Green | 3 | – | 4 | 3 | – | 8 |
| UMass | 2 | – | 5 | 5 | – | 6 |
| Kent State | 2 | – | 5 | 3 | – | 8 |
| Ball State | 2 | – | 5 | 3 | – | 8 |
| Akron | 1 | – | 6 | 2 | – | 9 |
| Sacramento State | 1 | – | 7 | 2 | – | 9 |
Championship: December 5, 2026
As of November 21, 2026; Rankings from AP poll

The 2026 Toledo Rockets football team is representing the University of Toledo in the Mid-American Conference (MAC) during the 2026 NCAA Division I FBS football season. The team play home games on their campus from the Glass Bowl, located in Toledo, Ohio. The Rockets are being led by first-year head coach with the program Mike Jacobs. They look to do better their 8–5 record the previous season.

== Schedule ==
| Date | Time | Opponent | Site | TV | Result | Attendance |
|---|---|---|---|---|---|---|
| September 4 | 8:00 p.m. | at Michigan State* | Spartan Stadium; East Lansing, MI | FS1 | L 20–30 | 72,083 |
| September 12 | 3:30 p.m. | Central Connecticut* | Glass Bowl; Toledo, OH | ESPN+ | W 63–10 | 18,435 |
| September 19 | 3:00 p.m. | Temple* | Glass Bowl; Toledo, OH | CBSSN | W 49–48 ^{OT} | 19,011 |
| September 26 | 12:00 p.m. | San Diego State* | Glass Bowl; Toledo, OH | CBSSN | W 41–16 | 22,126 |
| October 3 | 2:00 p.m. | at Ball State | Scheumann Stadium; Muncie, IN | ESPN+ | W 39–24 | 9,744 |
| October 10 | 3:30 p.m. | Buffalo^{†} | Glass Bowl; Toledo, OH | ESPN+ | L 8–23 | 24,767 |
| October 17 | 3:30 p.m. | at Eastern Michigan | Rynearson Stadium; Ypsilanti, MI | ESPN+ | W 34–14 | 10,373 |
| October 24 | 12:00 p.m. | Western Michigan | Glass Bowl; Toledo, OH | CBSSN | W 45–38 | 23,836 |
| November 4 | 7:00 p.m. | at Sacramento State | Hornet Stadium; Sacramento, CA | CBSSN | W 20–17 | 7,928 |
| November 11 | 7:30 p.m. | UMass | Glass Bowl; Toledo, OH | CBSSN | W 24–0 | 19,137 |
| November 20 | 7:30 p.m. | Bowling Green | Glass Bowl; Toledo, OH (Battle of I-75) | ESPN2 | W 19–0 | 29,216 |
| November 27 | 12:00 p.m. | at Ohio | Peden Stadium; Athens, OH | ESPNU | | |
*Non-conference game; ^{†}Homecoming; All times are in Eastern time

== Game summaries ==
=== at Michigan State ===
Toledo Rockets (0–0) at Michigan State Spartans (0–0) – Game summary

| Quarter | 1 | 2 | 3 | 4 | Total |
|---|---|---|---|---|---|
| Rockets | 0 | 7 | 7 | 6 | 20 |
| Spartans | 10 | 9 | 0 | 11 | 30 |

at Spartan Stadium • East Lansing, Michigan

- Date: September 4
- Game time: 8:00 p.m. EST
- Game weather: Sunny • Temperature: 80 °F (27 °C) • Wind: NW at 6 miles per hour (9.7 km/h)
- Game attendance: 72,083
- Referee: Matthew Richards
- TV announcers (FS1): Noah Reed (play-by-play) and Petros Papadakis (analyst)

Game information

First quarter

- MSU – Cam Edwards 2-yard run (Liam Boyd kick), 6:59. Spartans 7–0. Drive: 13 plays, 63 yards, 7:14.
- MSU – Liam Boyd 32-yard field goal, 0:06. Spartans 10–0. Drive: 11 plays, 56 yards, 5:34.

Second quarter

- MSU – Liam Boyd 42-yard field goal, 11:37. Spartans 13–0. Drive: 5 plays, 16 yards, 2:45.
- TOL – Adjatay Dabbs 60-yard pass from John Alan Richter (Reice Griffith kick), 7:50. Spartans 13–7. Drive: 7 plays, 75 yards, 3:47.
- MSU – Liam Boyd 48-yard field goal, 4:10. Spartans 16–7. Drive: 7 plays, 15 yards, 3:32.
- MSU – Liam Boyd 35-yard field goal, 0:00. Spartans 19–7. Drive: 10 plays, 46 yards, 2:33.

Third quarter

- TOL – Adjatay Dabbs 6-yard pass from John Alan Richter (Reice Griffith kick), 6:49. Spartans 19–14. Drive: 6 plays, 60 yards, 2:08.

Fourth quarter

- TOL – Connor Walendzak 71-yard run (pass failed), 13:47. Rockets 20–19. Drive: 2 plays, 71 yards, 0:49.
- MSU – Rodney Bullard Jr. 5-yard pass from Alessio Milivojevic (Alessio Milivojevic–Rodney Bullard Jr. pass), 10:37. Spartans 27–20. Drive: 7 plays, 70 yards, 3:10.
- MSU – Liam Boyd 51-yard field goal, 1:55. Spartans 30–20. Drive: 11 plays, 43 yards, 5:55.

| Statistics | TOL | MSU |
|---|---|---|
| First downs | 10 | 26 |
| Plays–yards | 41–273 | 83–397 |
| Rushes–yards | 20–77 | 89–150 |
| Passing yards | 196 | 247 |
| Passing: comp–att–int | 12–21–1 | 26–34–0 |
| Turnovers | 1 | 0 |
| Time of possession | 16:44 | 43:16 |

| Team | Category | Player | Statistics |
|---|---|---|---|
| Toledo | Passing | John Alan Richter | 12/21, 196 yards, 2 TD, INT |
| Toledo | Rushing | Connor Walendzak | 7 carries, 76 yards, TD |
| Toledo | Receiving | Adjatay Dabbs | 4 receptions, 101 yards, 2 TD |
| Michigan State | Passing | Alessio Milivojevic | 26/34, 247 yards, TD |
| Michigan State | Rushing | Cam Edwards | 27 carries, 98 yards, TD |
| Michigan State | Receiving | Rodney Bullard Jr | 7 receptions, 90 yards, TD |

=== Central Connecticut (FCS) ===
Central Connecticut Blue Devils (FCS) (0–1) at Toledo Rockets (0–1) – Game summary

| Quarter | 1 | 2 | 3 | 4 | Total |
|---|---|---|---|---|---|
| Blue Devils (FCS) | 3 | 0 | 0 | 7 | 10 |
| Rockets | 14 | 21 | 21 | 7 | 63 |

at Glass Bowl • Toledo, Ohio

- Date: September 12
- Game time: 3:30 p.m. EST
- Game weather: Cloudy • Temperature: 81 °F (27 °C) • Wind: SW at 7 miles per hour (11 km/h)
- Game attendance: 18,435
- Referee: Chris LaMange
- TV announcers (ESPN+): Bill Spaulding (play-by-play) and Doc Holliday (analyst)

Game information

First quarter

- CCSU – Jack Hennessey 25-yard field goal, 14:36. Blue Devils 3–0. Drive: 4 plays, 0 yards, 0:17.
- TOL – Connor Walendzak 4-yard pass from John Alan Richter (Reice Griffith kick), 10:57. Rockets 7–3. Drive: 8 plays, 64 yards, 3:31.
- TOL – Rico Bond 85-yard pass from John Alan Richter (Reice Griffith kick), 0:52. Rockets 14–3. Drive: 1 plays, 85 yards, 0:09.

Second quarter

- TOL – Autavius Ison 3-yard run (Reice Griffith kick), 12:07. Rockets 21–3. Drive: 6 plays, 27 yards, 2:49.
- TOL – CJ Miller 14-yard run (Reice Griffith kick), 8:35. Rockets 28–3. Drive: 7 plays, 53 yards, 1:51.
- TOL – Hayden Roy 0-yard blocked punt return (Reice Griffith kick), 1:23. Rockets 35–3.

Third quarter

- TOL – Adjatay Dabbs 4-yard pass from John Alan Richter (Reice Griffith kick), 9:49. Rockets 42–3. Drive: 10 plays, 58 yards, 4:13.
- TOL – Connor Walendzak 1-yard run (Reice Griffith kick), 5:16. Rockets 49–3. Drive: 5 plays, 50 yards, 2:11.
- TOL – Khamoni Robinson 38-yard run (Reice Griffith kick), 1:00. Rockets 56–3. Drive: 9 plays, 63 yards, 3:54.

Fourth quarter

- CCSU – Melvin Jacobs 14-yard interception return (Jack Hennessey kick), 12:40. Rockets 56–10.
- TOL – Cooper Rusk 40-yard pass from Walter Moses (Reice Griffith kick), 3:42. Rockets 63–10. Drive: 7 plays, 56 yards, 4:16.

| Statistics | CCSU | TOL |
|---|---|---|
| First downs | 7 | 28 |
| Plays–yards | 58–139 | 76–569 |
| Rushes–yards | 25–73 | 38–256 |
| Passing yards | 66 | 313 |
| Passing: comp–att–int | 13–33–1 | 18–31–1 |
| Turnovers | 1 | 2 |
| Time of possession | 25:57 | 34:03 |

| Team | Category | Player | Statistics |
|---|---|---|---|
| Central Connecticut | Passing | Conner Kenyon | 8/15, 40 yards |
| Central Connecticut | Rushing | Brett Griffis | 5 carries, 31 yards |
| Central Connecticut | Receiving | Damani Williams | 4 receptions, 21 yards |
| Toledo | Passing | John Alan Richter | 15/24, 252 yards, 3 TD |
| Toledo | Rushing | CJ Miller | 9 carries, 56 yards, TD |
| Toledo | Receiving | Rico Bond | 4 receptions, 135 yards, TD |

=== Temple ===
Temple Owls (1–1) at Toledo Rockets (1–1) – Game summary

| Quarter | 1 | 2 | 3 | 4 | OT | Total |
|---|---|---|---|---|---|---|
| Owls | 10 | 14 | 3 | 15 | 6 | 48 |
| Rockets | 7 | 7 | 7 | 21 | 7 | 49 |

at Glass Bowl • Toledo, Ohio

- Date: September 19
- Game time: 3:00 p.m. EST
- Game weather: Cloudy • Temperature: 64 °F (18 °C) • Wind: SE at 9 miles per hour (14 km/h)
- Game attendance: 19,011
- Referee: Kevin Randall
- TV announcers (CBSSN): Jack Gordon (play-by-play) and Taylor McHargue (analyst)

Game information

First quarter

- TEM – Carl Hardin 41-yard field goal, 12:10. Owls 3–0. Drive: 4 plays, 1 yards, 0:55.
- TOL – CJ Miller 1-yard run (Reice Griffith kick), 8:10. Rockets 7–3. Drive: 11 plays, 75 yards, 4:00.
- TEM – Joey Schlaffer 2-yard pass from Ajani Sheppard (Carl Hardin kick), 2:00. Owls 10–7. Drive: 12 plays, 73 yards, 6:05.

Second quarter

- TEM – Samuel Brown 3-yard run (Carl Hardin kick), 6:48. Owls 17–7. Drive: 13 plays, 60 yards, 6:24.
- TOL – Connor Walendzak 2-yard run (Reice Griffith kick), 5:11. Owls 17–14. Drive: 4 plays, 75 yards, 1:37.
- TEM – Samuel Brown 2-yard pass from Ajani Sheppard (Carl Hardin kick), 0:02. Owls 24–14. Drive: 13 plays, 75 yards, 5:09.

Third quarter

- TOL – Jake Newell 9-yard pass from John Alan Richter (Reice Griffith kick), 10:29. Owls 24–21. Drive: 10 plays, 75 yards, 4:31.
- TEM – Carl Hardin 48-yard field goal, 5:09. Owls 27–21. Drive: 8 plays, 45 yards, 5:20.

Fourth quarter

- TOL – Connor Walendzak 9-yard pass from John Alan Richter (Reice Griffith kick), 12:29. Rockets 28–27. Drive: 8 plays, 32 yards, 2:26.
- TEM – Colin Chase 69-yard pass from Ajani Sheppard (Peter Clarke pass), 11:40. Owls 35–28. Drive: 2 plays, 73 yards, 0:41.
- TEM – Samuel Brown 2-yard run (Carl Hardin kick), 6:40. Owls 42–28. Drive: 6 plays, 65 yards, 3:54.
- TOL – CJ Miller 10-yard pass from John Alan Richter (Reice Griffith kick), 1:05. Owls 42–35. Drive: 10 plays, 83 yards, 2:03.
- TOL – Daryl Barnett JR. 23-yard pass from John Alan Richter (Reice Griffith kick), 0:54. Tied 42–42. Drive: 2 plays, 49 yards, 0:09.

Overtime

- TOL – Connor Walendzak 1-yard run (Reice Griffith kick), 0:00. Rockets 49–42. Drive: 2 plays, 25 yards, 0:00.
- TEM – Ajani Sheppard 22-yard run (pass failed), 0:00. Rockets 49–48. Drive: 2 plays, 25 yards, 0:00.

| Statistics | TEM | TOL |
|---|---|---|
| First downs | 21 | 27 |
| Plays–yards | 72–425 | 76–536 |
| Rushes–yards | 49–261 | 25–107 |
| Passing yards | 164 | 429 |
| Passing: comp–att–int | 12–23–0 | 36–51–0 |
| Turnovers | 1 | 1 |
| Time of possession | 33:38 | 26:22 |

| Team | Category | Player | Statistics |
|---|---|---|---|
| Temple | Passing | Ajani Sheppard | 12/22, 164 yards, 3 TD |
| Temple | Rushing | Samuel Brown V | 15 carries, 109 yards, 2 TD |
| Temple | Receiving | Colin Chase | 3 receptions, 77 yards, TD |
| Toledo | Passing | John Alan Richter | 36/51, 429 yards, 4 TD |
| Toledo | Rushing | Connor Walendzak | 12 carries, 62 yards, 2 TD |
| Toledo | Receiving | Terrell Crosby Jr. | 7 receptions, 95 yards |

=== San Diego State ===
San Diego State Aztecs (1–2) at Toledo Rockets (2–1) – Game summary

| Quarter | 1 | 2 | 3 | 4 | Total |
|---|---|---|---|---|---|
| Aztecs | 3 | 0 | 6 | 7 | 16 |
| Rockets | 7 | 10 | 17 | 7 | 41 |

at Glass Bowl • Toledo, Ohio

- Date: September 26
- Game time: 12:00 p.m. EST
- Game weather: Sunny • Temperature: 68 °F (20 °C) • Wind: NE at 6 miles per hour (9.7 km/h)
- Game attendance: 22,126
- Referee: Preston Clipper
- TV announcers (CBSSN): Jack Gordon (play-by-play) and Taylor McHargue (analyst)

Game information

First quarter

- SDSU – Cooper DiLeva 25-yard field goal, 11:59. Aztecs 3–0. Drive: 10 plays, 68 yards, 3:01.
- TOL – Adjatay Dabbs 19-yard pass from John Alan Richter (Reice Griffith kick), 7:09. Rockets 7–3. Drive: 3 plays, 45 yards, 1:01.

Second quarter

- TOL – Reice Griffith 38-yard field goal, 4:43. Rockets 10–3. Drive: 11 plays, 40 yards, 4:59.
- TOL – Bryson Hammer 78-yard pass from John Alan Richter (Reice Griffith kick), 1:44. Rockets 17–3. Drive: 3 plays, 88 yards, 0:54.

Third quarter

- TOL – Bryson Hammer 38-yard pass from John Alan Richter (Reice Griffith kick), 14:53. Rockets 24–3. Drive: 1 plays, 38 yards, 0:06.
- TOL – Reice Griffith 49-yard field goal, 9:55. Rockets 27–3. Drive: 8 plays, 54 yards, 3:33.
- TOL – Isaac Zay 67-yard interception touchdown (Reice Griffith kick), 6:34. Rockets 34–3
- SDSU – Ryan Wolfer 11-yard run (rush failed), 0:20. Rockets 34–9. Drive: 15 plays, 78 yards, 6:08.

Fourth quarter

- TOL – Connor Walendzak 1-yard run (Reice Griffith kick), 12:11. Rockets 41–9. Drive: 7 plays, 73 yards, 3:04.
- SDSU – Jaylon Hawkins 14-yard pass from Draiden Trudeau (Cooper DiLeva kick), 2:38. Rockets 41–16. Drive: 9 plays, 65 yards, 3:18.

| Statistics | SDSU | TOL |
|---|---|---|
| First downs | 16 | 19 |
| Plays–yards | 68–296 | 70–494 |
| Rushes–yards | 31–48 | 48–210 |
| Passing yards | 248 | 284 |
| Passing: comp–att–int | 24–37–1 | 16–22–0 |
| Turnovers | 2 | 0 |
| Time of possession | 26:35 | 22:25 |

| Team | Category | Player | Statistics |
|---|---|---|---|
| San Diego State | Passing | Jayden Denegal | 19/31, 206 yards, TD, INT |
| San Diego State | Rushing | Josiah Lucas | 9 carries, 18 yards |
| San Diego State | Receiving | Jacob Bostick | 3 receptions, 69 yards |
| Toledo | Passing | John Alan Richter | 16/22, 284 yards, 3 TD |
| Toledo | Rushing | Autavius Ison | 15 carries, 89 yards |
| Toledo | Receiving | Bryson Hammer | 6 receptions, 133 yards, 2 TD |

=== at Ball State ===
Toledo Rockets (3–1) at Ball State Cardinals (1–3) – Game summary

| Quarter | 1 | 2 | 3 | 4 | Total |
|---|---|---|---|---|---|
| Rockets | 6 | 9 | 7 | 17 | 39 |
| Cardinals | 7 | 3 | 7 | 7 | 24 |

at Scheumann Stadium • Muncie, Indiana

- Date: October 3
- Game time: 2:00 p.m. EST
- Game weather: Sunny • Temperature: 67 °F (19 °C) • Wind: NE at 13 miles per hour (21 km/h)
- Game attendance: 9,744
- Referee: Matt Packowski
- TV announcers (ESPN+): Kelsie Kasper (play-by-play) and Marcus Ray (analyst)

Game information

First quarter

- BSU – Alex Scherle 4-yard pass from Keldric Luster (Brody Boehm kick), 10:09. Cardinals 7–0. Drive: 10 plays, 75 yards, 4:51.
- TOL – Reice Griffith 43-yard field goal, 8:05. Cardinals 7–3. Drive: 6 plays, 49 yards, 2:04.
- TOL – Reice Griffith 21-yard field goal, 3:47. Cardinals 7–6. Drive: 9 plays, 34 yards, 2:58.

Second quarter

- BSU – Brody Boehm 38-yard field goal, 10:49. Cardinals 10–6. Drive: 7 plays, 45 yards, 2:43.
- TOL – Team safety, 7:58. Cardinals 10–8.
- TOL – Daryl Barnett Jr. 11-yard pass from John Alan Richter (Reice Griffith kick), 0:00. Rockets 15–10. Drive: 8 plays, 80 yards, 1:25.

Third quarter

- TOL – Connor Walendzak 30-yard run (Reice Griffith kick), 2:57. Rockets 22–10. Drive: 5 plays, 72 yards, 1:48.
- BSU – TJ Horton 66-yard run (Brody Boehm kick), 2:17. Rockets 22–17. Drive: 2 plays, 75 yards, 0:40.

Fourth quarter

- TOL – CJ Miller 2-yard run (Reice Griffith kick), 13:27. Rockets 29–17. Drive: 8 plays, 75 yards, 3:50.
- TOL – Reice Griffith 24-yard field goal, 3:30. Rockets 32–17. Drive: 13 plays, 37 yards, 7:18.
- BSU – Jabari Smith 33-yard pass from Keldric Luster (Brody Boehm kick), 2:09. Rockets 32–24. Drive: 5 plays, 49 yards, 1:12.
- TOL – CJ Miller 68-yard run (Reice Griffith kick), 1:35. Rockets 39–24. Drive: 4 plays, 84 yards, 0:31.

| Statistics | TOL | BALL |
|---|---|---|
| First downs | 27 | 18 |
| Plays–yards | 86–553 | 62–370 |
| Rushes–yards | 51–352 | 27–132 |
| Passing yards | 201 | 238 |
| Passing: comp–att–int | 19–35–0 | 22–35–1 |
| Turnovers | 0 | 2 |
| Time of possession | 34:20 | 25:40 |

| Team | Category | Player | Statistics |
|---|---|---|---|
| Toledo | Passing | John Alan Richter | 19/35, 201 yards, TD |
| Toledo | Rushing | CJ Miller | 20 carries, 196 yards, 2 TD |
| Toledo | Receiving | Adjatay Dabbs | 6 receptions, 196 yards, 2 TD |
| Ball State | Passing | Keldric Luster | 21/33, 224 yards, 2 TD, INT |
| Ball State | Rushing | TJ Horton | 9 carries, 90 yards, TD |
| Ball State | Receiving | Donovan Hamilton | 6 receptions, 70 yards |

=== Buffalo ===
Buffalo Bulls (2–3) at Toledo Rockets (4–1) – Game summary

| Quarter | 1 | 2 | 3 | 4 | Total |
|---|---|---|---|---|---|
| Bulls | 6 | 7 | 3 | 7 | 23 |
| Rockets | 0 | 0 | 0 | 8 | 8 |

at Glass Bowl • Toldeo, OH

- Date: October 10
- Game time: 3:30 p.m. EST
- Game weather: Cloudy • Temperature: 74 °F (23 °C) • Wind: SE at 7 miles per hour (11 km/h)
- Game attendance: 24,767
- Referee: Rick Warne
- TV announcers (ESPN+): Doug Sherman (play-by-play) and Forest Conoly (analyst)

Game information

First quarter

- BUF – Oliver Hautanen 24-yard field goal, 10:24. Bulls 3–0. Drive: 12 plays, 69 yards, 4:36.
- BUF – Oliver Hautanen 29-yard field goal, 3:11. Bulls 6–0. Drive: 12 plays, 72 yards, 4:17.

Second quarter

- BUF – Jason Wright 3-yard run (Oliver Hautanen kick), 5:21. Bulls 13–0. Drive: 4 plays, 11 yards, 1:59.

Third quarter

- BUF – Oliver Hautanen 31-yard field goal, 9:52. Bulls 16–0. Drive: 8 plays, 25 yards, 3:39.

Fourth quarter

- TOL – Connor Walendzak 1-yard run (John Alan Richter–Adjatay Dabbs pass), 4:45. Bulls 16–8. Drive: 14 plays, 86 yards, 4:39.
- BUF – Messiah Burch 87-yard run (Oliver Hautanen kick), 4:30. Bulls 23–8. Drive: 1 plays, 87 yards, 0:15.

| Statistics | UB | TOL |
|---|---|---|
| First downs | 22 | 16 |
| Plays–yards | 78–351 | 61–308 |
| Rushes–yards | 47–180 | 26–105 |
| Passing yards | 171 | 203 |
| Passing: comp–att–int | 14–31–0 | 22–35–0 |
| Turnovers | 0 | 3 |
| Time of possession | 35:25 | 24:35 |

| Team | Category | Player | Statistics |
|---|---|---|---|
| Buffalo | Passing | Jason Wright | 14/31, 171 yards |
| Buffalo | Rushing | Messiah Burch | 17 carries, 137 yards, TD |
| Buffalo | Receiving | Dwayne Early JR. | 4 receptions, 77 yards |
| Toledo | Passing | John Alan Richter | 22/35, 203 yards |
| Toledo | Rushing | Connor Walendzak | 10 carries, 50 yards, TD |
| Toledo | Receiving | Terrell Crosby Jr. | 8 receptions, 69 yards |

=== at Eastern Michigan ===
Toledo Rockets (4–2) at Eastern Michigan Eagles (4–3) – Game summary

| Quarter | 1 | 2 | 3 | 4 | Total |
|---|---|---|---|---|---|
| Rockets | 10 | 21 | 3 | 0 | 34 |
| Eagles | 0 | 7 | 7 | 0 | 14 |

at Rynearson Stadium • Ypsilanti, Michigan

- Date: October 17
- Game time: 3:30 p.m. EST
- Game weather: Sunny • Temperature: 51 °F (11 °C) • Wind: W at 13 miles per hour (21 km/h)
- Game attendance: 10,373
- Referee: Billy Williams
- TV announcers (ESPN+): Shawn Kenny (play-by-play) and Marcus Ray (analyst)

Game information

First quarter

- TOL – Adjatay Dabbs 28-yard pass from John Alan Richter (Reice Griffith kick), 7:50. Rockets 7–0. Drive: 7 plays, 65 yards, 3:04.
- TOL – Reice Griffith 30-yard field goal, 6:21. Rockets 10–0. Drive: 4 plays, 2 yards, 1:22.

Second quarter

- TOL – CJ Miller 1-yard run (Reice Griffith kick), 14:13. Rockets 17–0. Drive: 11 plays, 65 yards, 6:00.
- EMU – Joshua Long 30-yard pass from Noah Kim (Rudy Kessinger kick), 10:46. Rockets 17–7. Drive: 8 plays, 73 yards, 3:18.
- TOL – Autavius Ison 13-yard run (Reice Griffith kick), 07:27. Rockets 24–7. Drive: 7 plays, 81 yards, 3:12.
- TOL – CJ Miller 3-yard run (Reice Griffith kick), 1:36. Rockets 31–7. Drive: 11 plays, 90 yards, 3:44.

Third quarter

- TOL – Reice Griffith 29-yard field goal, 10:54. Rockets 34–7. Drive: 4 plays, 1 yards, 0:46.
- EMU – Harold Mack 12-yard pass from Noah Kim (Rudy Kessinger kick), 3:57. Rockets 34–14. Drive: 11 plays, 68 yards, 3:25.

Fourth quarter

- No Scoring plays

| Statistics | TOL | EMU |
|---|---|---|
| First downs | 21 | 21 |
| Plays–yards | 70–480 | 71–276 |
| Rushes–yards | 40–192 | 28–34 |
| Passing yards | 288 | 242 |
| Passing: comp–att–int | 24–30–0 | 20–43–0 |
| Turnovers | 1 | 2 |
| Time of possession | 33:35 | 26:25 |

| Team | Category | Player | Statistics |
|---|---|---|---|
| Toledo | Passing | John Alan Richter | 24/30, 288 yards, TD |
| Toledo | Rushing | Autavius Ison | 18 carries, 104 yards, TD |
| Toledo | Receiving | Bryson Hammer | 5 receptions, 69 yards |
| Eastern Michigan | Passing | Noah Kim | 16/36, 214 yards, 2 TD |
| Eastern Michigan | Rushing | Amareon Blue | 7 carries, 23 yards |
| Eastern Michigan | Receiving | Joshua Long | 7 receptions, 84 yards, TD |

=== Western Michigan ===
Western Michigan Broncos (5–2) at Toledo Rockets (5–2) – Game summary

| Quarter | 1 | 2 | 3 | 4 | Total |
|---|---|---|---|---|---|
| Broncos | 0 | 14 | 21 | 3 | 38 |
| Rockets | 14 | 17 | 7 | 7 | 45 |

at Glass Bowl • Toledo, Ohio

- Date: October 24
- Game time: 12:00 p.m. EST
- Game weather: Sunny • Temperature: 61 °F (16 °C) • Wind: E at 2 miles per hour (3.2 km/h)
- Game attendance: 23,836
- Referee: Andrew Speciale
- TV announcers (CBSSN): Chris Lewis (play-by-play) and Doug Pederson (analyst)

Game information

First quarter

- TOL – John Alan Richter 4-yard run (Reice Griffith kick), 11:03. Rockets 7–0. Drive: 6 plays, 32 yards, 2:24.
- TOL – Autavius Ison 3-yard run (Reice Griffith kick), 5:40. Rockets 14–0. Drive: 9 plays, 92 yards, 3:18.

Second quarter

- TOL – Reice Griffith 23-yard field goal, 14:58. Rockets 17–0. Drive: 7 plays, 32 yards, 3:09.
- WMU – Aveion Chenault 13-yard pass from Broc Lowry (Dieter Kelly kick), 10:04. Rockets 17–7. Drive: 10 plays, 74 yards, 4:48.
- TOL – Daryl Barnett Jr. 7-yard pass from John Alan Richter (Reice Griffith kick), 7:40. Rockets 24–7. Drive: 5 plays, 75 yards, 2:24.
- WMU – Jalen Buckley 3-yard run (Dieter Kelly kick), 1:56. Rockets 24–14. Drive: 5 plays, 80 yards, 2:33.
- TOL – Adjatay Dabbs 17-yard pass from John Alan Richter (Reice Griffith kick), 0:10. Rockets 31–14. Drive: 10 plays, 82 yards, 1:41.

Third quarter

- WMU – Josh Franklin 92-yard kickoff return (Dieter Kelly kick), 14:47. Rockets 31–21.
- WMU – Broc Lowry 2-yard run (Dieter Kelly kick), 7:58. Rockets 31–28. Drive: 11 plays, 55 yards, 5:10.
- TOL – Adjatay Dabbs 5-yard pass from John Alan Richter (Reice Griffith kick), 5:48. Rockets 38–28. Drive: 8 plays, 75 yards, 2:10.
- WMU – Baylin Brooks 41-yard pass from Broc Lowry (Dieter Kelly kick), 3:14. Rockets 38–35. Drive: 5 plays, 70 yards, 2:30.

Fourth quarter

- WMU – Dieter Kelly 23-yard field goal, 9:19. Tied 38–38. Drive: 11 plays, 61 yards, 5:00.
- TOL – CJ Miller 11-yard run (Reice Griffith kick), 4:23. Rockets 45–38. Drive: 10 plays, 75 yards, 4:56.

| Statistics | WMU | TOL |
|---|---|---|
| First downs | 18 | 32 |
| Plays–yards | 62–351 | 88–595 |
| Rushes–yards | 33–144 | 47–204 |
| Passing yards | 207 | 391 |
| Passing: comp–att–int | 12–29–2 | 29–41–1 |
| Turnovers | 3 | 2 |
| Time of possession | 26:40 | 33:20 |

| Team | Category | Player | Statistics |
|---|---|---|---|
| Western Michigan | Passing | Broc Lowry | 12/29, 207 yards, 2 TD, 2 INT |
| Western Michigan | Rushing | Jalen Buckley | 18 carries, 92 yards, TD |
| Western Michigan | Receiving | Aveion Chenault | 6 receptions, 105 yards, TD |
| Toledo | Passing | John Alan Richter | 29/41, 391 yards, 3 TD, INT |
| Toledo | Rushing | CJ Miller | 33 carries, 183 yards, TD |
| Toledo | Receiving | Adjatay Dabbs | 8 receptions, 124 yards, 2 TD |

=== at Sacramento State ===
Toledo Rockets (6–2) at Sacramento State Hornets (2–7) – Game summary

| Quarter | 1 | 2 | 3 | 4 | Total |
|---|---|---|---|---|---|
| Rockets | 7 | 0 | 10 | 3 | 20 |
| Hornets | 3 | 7 | 0 | 7 | 17 |

at Hornet Stadium • Sacramento, California

- Date: November 4
- Game time: 7:00 p.m. EST
- Game weather: Sunny • Temperature: 67 °F (19 °C) • Wind: NW at 8 miles per hour (13 km/h)
- Game attendance: 7,928
- Referee: Marcel Kerr
- TV announcers (CBSSN.): Justin Kutcher (play-by-play) and Ben DiNucci (analyst)

Game information

First quarter

- TOL – Anthony Simpson 18-yard pass from John Alan Richter (Reice Griffith kick), 7:32. Rockets 7–0. Drive: 5 plays, 32 yards, 2:14.
- SAC – Grant Meadors 38-yard field goal, 5:09. Rockets 7–3. Drive: 5 plays, 32 yards, 2:14.

Second quarter

- SAC – Matthew Coleman 2-yard pass from Jackson Sharman (Grant Meadors kick), 9:30. Hornets 10–7. Drive: 10 plays, 43 yards, 4:42.

Third quarter

- TOL – Reice Griffith 34-yard field goal, 6:18. Tied 10–10. Drive: 7 plays, 36 yards, 3:39.
- TOL – Autavius Ison 19-yard run (Reice Griffith kick), 1:26. Rockets 17–10. Drive: 7 plays, 70 yards, 2:49.

Fourth quarter

- TOL – Reice Griffith 40-yard field goal, 7:51. Rockets 20–10. Drive: 7 plays, 34 yards, 3:34.
- SAC – Jamar Curtis 3-yard run (Grant Meadors kick), 2:20. Rockets 20–17. Drive: 12 plays, 75 yards, 5:31.

| Statistics | TOL | SAC |
|---|---|---|
| First downs | 17 | 12 |
| Plays–yards | 66–290 | 64–224 |
| Rushes–yards | 49–230 | 31–8 |
| Passing yards | 60 | 216 |
| Passing: comp–att–int | 9–17–1 | 20–33–0 |
| Turnovers | 1 | 1 |
| Time of possession | 29:35 | 30:25 |

| Team | Category | Player | Statistics |
|---|---|---|---|
| Toledo | Passing | John Alan Richter | 9/17, 60 yards, INT |
| Toledo | Rushing | CJ Miller | 27 carries, 135 yards |
| Toledo | Receiving | Anthony Simpson | 1 reception, 18 yards, TD |
| Sacramento State | Passing | Jackson Sharman | 8/15, 113 yards, TD |
| Sacramento State | Rushing | Daniel Swinney | 4 carries, 24 yards |
| Sacramento State | Receiving | Raiden Brown | 5 receptions, 108 yards |

=== UMass ===
UMass Minutemen (5–4) at Toledo Rockets (7–2) – Game summary

| Quarter | 1 | 2 | 3 | 4 | Total |
|---|---|---|---|---|---|
| Minutemen | 0 | 0 | 0 | 0 | 0 |
| Rockets | 7 | 17 | 0 | 0 | 24 |

at Glass Bowl • Toledo, Ohio

- Date: November 11
- Game time: 7:30 p.m. EST
- Game weather: Cloudy • Temperature: 49 °F (9 °C) • Wind: NE at 6 miles per hour (9.7 km/h)
- Game attendance: 19,137
- Referee: Andrew Speciale
- TV announcers (CBSSN): John Sadak (play-by-play) and Randy Cross (analyst)

Game information

First quarter

- TOL – Connor Walendzak 69-yard run (Reice Griffith kick), 4:20. Rockets 7–0. Drive: 5 plays, 90 yards, 2:17.

Second quarter

- TOL – Reice Griffith 27-yard field goal, 12:59. Rockets 10–0. Drive: 11 plays, 68 yards, 4:52.
- TOL – Nicholas Thompson 62-yard interception touchdown (Reice Griffith kick), 10:32. Rockets 17–0
- TOL – Connor Walendzak 17-yard pass from John Alan Richter (Reice Griffith kick), 1:51. Rockets 24–0. Drive: 4 plays, 57 yards, 1:18.

Third quarter

- No Scoring plays

Fourth quarter

- No Scoring plays

| Statistics | MASS | TOL |
|---|---|---|
| First downs | 10 | 17 |
| Plays–yards | 59–188 | 67–436 |
| Rushes–yards | 28–67 | 45–239 |
| Passing yards | 188 | 436 |
| Passing: Comp–Att–Int | 12–31–1 | 13–22–0 |
| Turnovers | 1 | 0 |
| Time of possession | 25:27 | 34:33 |

| Team | Category | Player | Statistics |
|---|---|---|---|
| UMass | Passing | Logan Inagawa | 10/27, 99 yards, INT |
| UMass | Rushing | Logan Inagawa | 10 carries, 40 yards |
| UMass | Receiving | Drew Alsup | 2 receptions, 35 yards |
| Toledo | Passing | John Alan Richter | 13/22, 197 yards, TD |
| Toledo | Rushing | Connor Walendzak | 14 carries, 117 yards, TD |
| Toledo | Receiving | Adjatay Dabbs | 7 receptions, 144 yards |

=== Bowling Green (Battle of I-75) ===
Bowling Green Falcons (3–7) at Toledo Rockets (8–2) – Game summary

| Quarter | 1 | 2 | 3 | 4 | Total |
|---|---|---|---|---|---|
| Falcons | 0 | 0 | 0 | 0 | 0 |
| Rockets | 6 | 10 | 0 | 3 | 19 |

at Glass Bowl • Toledo, Ohio

- Date: November 20
- Game time: 7:30 p.m.
- Game weather: Clear • Temperature: 55 °F (13 °C) • Wind: SE at 2 miles per hour (3.2 km/h)
- Game attendance: 29,216
- Referee: Rich Edwards
- TV announcers (ESPN2): Courtney Lyle (play-by-play) and Rene Ingoglia (analyst)

Game information

First quarter

- TOL – Reice Griffith 46-yard field goal, 12:50. Rockets 3–0. Drive: 8 plays, 31 yards, 2:01.
- TOL – Reice Griffith 29-yard field goal, 2:29. Rockets 6–0. Drive: 13 plays, 51 yards, 6:11.

Second quarter

- TOL – Reice Griffith 39-yard field goal, 9:21. Rockets 9–0. Drive: 7 plays, 62 yards, 2:26.
- TOL – Adjatay Dabbs 35-yard pass from John Alan Richter (Reice Griffith kick), 0:46. Rockets 16–0. Drive: 2 plays, 35 yards, 0:10.

Third quarter

- No Scoring plays

Fourth quarter

- TOL – Reice Griffith 42-yard field goal, 3:54. Rockets 19–0. Drive: 8 plays, 38 yards, 5:15.

| Statistics | BGSU | TOL |
|---|---|---|
| First downs | 9 | 14 |
| Plays–yards | 51–188 | 65–290 |
| Rushes–yards | 29–44 | 41–99 |
| Passing yards | 144 | 191 |
| Passing: comp–att–int | 12–22–0 | 14–24–0 |
| Turnovers | 1 | 0 |
| Time of possession | 25:44 | 34:16 |

| Team | Category | Player | Statistics |
|---|---|---|---|
| Bowling Green | Passing | Austin Novosad | 12/22, 144 yards |
| Bowling Green | Rushing | Nakai Amachree | 19 carries, 57 yards |
| Bowling Green | Receiving | Joseph Saffold | 3 receptions, 60 yards |
| Toledo | Passing | John Alan Richter | 14/24, 191 yards, TD |
| Toledo | Rushing | Connor Walendzak | 17 carries, 66 yards |
| Toledo | Receiving | Connor Walendzak | 4 receptions, 44 yards |

=== at Ohio ===
Toledo Rockets (9–2) at Ohio Bobcats (8–3) – Game summary

| Quarter | 1 | 2 | Total |
|---|---|---|---|
| Rockets | | | 0 |
| Bobcats | | | 0 |

at Peden Stadium • Athens, Ohio

- Date: November 27
- Game time: 12:00 p.m. EST
- TV: ESPNU

Game information

First quarter
Second quarter
Third quarter
Fourth quarter

| Statistics | TOL | OHIO |
|---|---|---|
| First downs | | |
| Total yards | – | – |
| Rushing yards | – | – |
| Passing yards | | |
| Passing: Comp–Att–Int | –– | –– |
| Turnovers | | |
| Time of possession | | |

| Team | Category | Player | Statistics |
|---|---|---|---|
| Toledo | Passing | | |
| Toledo | Rushing | | |
| Toledo | Receiving | | |
| Ohio | Passing | | |
| Ohio | Rushing | | |
| Ohio | Receiving | | |
