= 2026 Western Michigan Broncos football team =

American college football season

2026 Western Michigan Broncos football
- Conference: Mid-American Conference
- Record: 8–3 (6–1 MAC)
- Head coach: Lance Taylor (4th season)
- Offensive coordinator: Walt Bell (3rd season)
- Offensive scheme: Multiple spread
- Defensive coordinator: Greer Martini (1st season)
- Co-defensive coordinator: Duane Vaughn (1st season)
- Base defense: Multiple 4–3
- Home stadium: Waldo Stadium

2026 Mid-American Conference football standings
	Conf.			Overall
Team	W		L	W		L
Ohio	6	–	1	8	–	3
Western Michigan	6	–	1	8	–	3
Buffalo	6	–	1	8	–	3
Toledo	6	–	1	9	–	2
Miami (OH)	5	–	2	7	–	4
Central Michigan	3	–	4	5	–	6
Eastern Michigan	3	–	4	4	–	7
Bowling Green	3	–	4	3	–	8
UMass	2	–	5	5	–	6
Kent State	2	–	5	3	–	8
Ball State	2	–	5	3	–	8
Akron	1	–	6	2	–	9
Sacramento State	1	–	7	2	–	9
Championship: December 5, 2026
As of November 21, 2026; Rankings from AP poll

The 2026 Western Michigan Broncos football team represents Western Michigan University in the Mid-American Conference (MAC) during the 2026 NCAA Division I FBS football season. The Broncos are led by head coach Lance Taylor and play their home games at Waldo Stadium in Kalamazoo, Michigan. Broc Lowry returned as the starting quarterback and the Broncos were picked by nine of the conference coaches to win the MAC conference in 2026.

== Schedule ==
Date	Time	Opponent	Site	TV	Result	Attendance
September 5	7:30 p.m.	at No. 16 Michigan*	Michigan Stadium; Ann Arbor, MI	NBC	L 12–13	110,879
September 12	6:30 p.m.	Monmouth*	Waldo Stadium; Kalamazoo, MI	ESPN+	W 49–14	24,605
September 19	7:00 p.m.	at Rice*	Rice Stadium; Houston, TX	ESPN+	W 28–21	14,255
September 26	3:30 p.m.	Boise State*	Waldo Stadium; Kalamazoo, MI	ESPN2	L 7–32	29,700
October 3	1:00 p.m.	at Buffalo	Broadview Stadium; Amherst, NY	ESPN+	W 20–17	6,350
October 10	3:30 p.m.	Kent State^{†}	Waldo Stadium; Kalamazoo, MI	ESPN+	W 38–7	20,868
October 17	1:30 p.m.	at Central Michigan	Kelly/Shorts Stadium; Mount Pleasant, MI (rivalry, Michigan MAC Trophy)	ESPN+	W 21–14	25,352
October 24	12:00 p.m.	at Toledo	Glass Bowl; Toledo, OH	CBSSN	L 38–45	23,836
October 31	12:00 p.m.	Bowling Green	Waldo Stadium; Kalamazoo, MI	CBSSN	W 23–10	20,179
November 10	7:00 p.m.	at Akron	InfoCision Stadium–Summa Field; Akron, OH	CBSSN	W 42–14	4,243
November 17	6:00 p.m.	Eastern Michigan	Waldo Stadium; Kalamazoo, MI (Michigan MAC Trophy)	ESPN2	W 34–27	10,978
November 24	7:00 p.m.	Miami (OH)	Waldo Stadium; Kalamazoo, MI	ESPN2		
*Non-conference game; ^{†}Homecoming; Rankings from AP Poll (and CFP Rankings, after November 3) – Released prior to game; All times are in Eastern time

== Game summaries ==
=== at No. 16 Michigan ===
Western Michigan Broncos (0–0) at No. 16 Michigan Wolverines (0–0) – Game summary

Quarter	1	2	3	4	Total
Broncos	3	3	0	6	12
No. 16 Wolverines	7	0	0	6	13

at Michigan Stadium • Ann Arbor, Michigan

- Date: September 5
- Game time: 7:30 p.m.
- Game weather: 70 °F (21 °C), cloudy, E 5 miles per hour (8.0 km/h)
- Game attendance: 110,879
- Referee: Jim Wharrie
- TV announcers (NBC): Noah Eagle (play-by-play), Todd Blackledge (analyst), and Kathryn Tappen (sideline reporter)

Game information

First quarter

- (9:40) MICH – Bryce Underwood 1-yard run, Trey Butkowski kick (Drive: 11 plays, 75 yards, 5:20; Michigan 7–0)
- (5:17) WMU – Dieter Kelly 52-yard field goal (Drive: 8 plays, 42 yards, 4:23; Michigan 7–3)

Second quarter

- (0:00) WMU – Dieter Kelly 45-yard field goal (Drive: 2 plays, -1 yards, 0:09; Michigan 7–6)

Third quarter

- No scoring plays

Fourth quarter

- (10:25) WMU – Dieter Kelly 39-yard field goal (Drive: 20 plays, 71 yards, 13:40; Western Michigan 9–7)
- (0:35) WMU – Dieter Kelly 33-yard field goal (Drive: 5 plays, 17 yards, 1:15; Western Michigan 12–7)
- (0:00) MICH – JJ Buchanan 47-yard pass from Bryce Underwood (Drive: 6 plays, 75 yards, 0:35; Michigan 13–12)

Statistics	WMU	MICH
First downs	16	12
Plays–yards	67–221	47–276
Rushes–yards	46–132	25–106
Passing yards	89	170
Passing: comp–att–int	15–21–0	12–23–1
Turnovers	0	3
Time of possession	40:08	19:52

Team	Category	Player	Statistics
Western Michigan	Passing	Broc Lowry	15/21, 89 yards
Western Michigan	Rushing	Jalen Buckley	19 carries, 62 yards
Western Michigan	Receiving	Aveion Chenault	6 receptions, 53 yards
Michigan	Passing	Bryce Underwood	12/22, 170 yards, TD, INT
Michigan	Rushing	Bryce Underwood	9 carries, 47 yards, TD
Michigan	Receiving	JJ Buchanan	6 receptions, 126 yards, TD

In the Broncos' season opener against Michigan, quarterback Bryce Underwood completed a 47-yard Hail Mary pass to JJ Buchanan as time expired to give the Wolverines a 13–12 victory. The game ended in controversy after officials corrected the game clock, adding one second after a first Hail Mary attempt at nine seconds.

=== Monmouth (FCS) ===
Monmouth Hawks (FCS) (1–1) at Western Michigan Broncos (0–1) – Game summary

Quarter	1	2	3	4	Total
Hawks (FCS)	0	0	7	7	14
Broncos	7	14	21	7	49

at Waldo Stadium • Kalamazoo, Michigan

- Date: September 12
- Game time: 6:30 p.m.
- Game weather: Clear • Temperature: 82 °F (28 °C) • Wind: NW at 8 miles per hour (13 km/h)
- Game attendance: 24,605
- Referee: Jason Perkins
- TV announcers (ESPN+): Evan Stockton and Marcus Ray

Game information

First quarter

- WMU – Baylin Brooks 13-yard pass from Broc Lowry (Dieter Kelly kick), 4:36. Broncos 7–0. Drive: 8 plays, 56 yards, 4:50.

Second quarter

- WMU – Egypt Nelson 23-yard pass from Broc Lowry (Dieter Kelly kick), 10:53. Broncos 14–0. Drive: 7 plays, 70 yards, 3:34.
- WMU – Jalen Buckley 1-yard run (Dieter Kelly kick), 4:47. Broncos 21–0. Drive: 2 plays, 5 yards, 0:32.

Third quarter

- WMU – Jalen Buckley 11-yard run (Dieter Kelly kick), 14:03. Broncos 28–0. Drive: 3 plays, 68 yards, 0:57.
- MONM – Tra Neal 5-yard pass from Frankie Weaver (Sky Sholder kick), 11:20. Broncos 28–7. Drive: 7 plays, 75 yards, 2:43.
- WMU – Baylin Brooks 12-yard pass from Broc Lowry (Dieter Kelly kick), 9:10. Broncos 35–7. Drive: 4 plays, 74 yards, 2:05.
- WMU – Jalen Buckley 1-yard run (Dieter Kelly kick), 3:55. Broncos 42–7. Drive: 4 plays, 43 yards, 2:10.

Fourth quarter

- WMU – Ryan Brotherton 21-yard pass from Trey Petty (Dieter Kelly kick), 4:11. Broncos 49–7. Drive: 14 plays, 86 yards, 7:52.
- MONM – Nazir Treadwell 1-yard run (Sky Sholder kick), 0:15. Broncos 49–14. Drive: 12 plays, 75 yards, 3:56.

Statistics	MONM	WMU
First downs	27	24
Plays–yards	90–431	57–414
Rushes–yards	44–158	32–148
Passing yards	273	266
Passing: comp–att–int	28–46–0	18–25–0
Turnovers	2	0
Time of possession	31:52	28:08

Team	Category	Player	Statistics
Monmouth	Passing	Frankie Weaver	28/46, 273 yards, TD
Monmouth	Rushing	Elijah Jennings	19 carries, 87 yards
Monmouth	Receiving	Tra Neal	7 receptions, 106 yards, TD
Western Michigan	Passing	Broc Lowry	14/20, 212 yards, 3 TD
Western Michigan	Rushing	Broc Lowry	4 carries, 40 yards
Western Michigan	Receiving	Aveion Chenault	4 receptions, 101 yards

=== at Rice ===
Western Michigan Broncos (1–1) at Rice Owls (1–1) – Game summary

Quarter	1	2	3	4	Total
Broncos	7	7	0	14	28
Owls	0	7	7	7	21

at Rice Stadium • Houston, Texas

- Date: September 19
- Game time: 7:00 p.m.
- Game weather: Sunny • Temperature: 91 °F (33 °C) • Wind: SE at 5 miles per hour (8.0 km/h)
- Game attendance: 14,255
- Referee: Matt Packowski
- TV announcers (ESPN+): Chris Elliott and Kenechi Udeze

Game information

First quarter
Second quarter
Third quarter
Fourth quarter

Statistics	WMU	RICE
First downs	17	20
Plays–yards	63–333	62–330
Rushes–yards	42–217	44–209
Passing yards	116	121
Passing: comp–att–int	14–21–0	11–18–0
Turnovers	1	0
Time of possession	32:53	27:07

Team	Category	Player	Statistics
Western Michigan	Passing	Broc Lowry	14/20, 116 yards, TD
Western Michigan	Rushing	Jalen Buckley	13 carries, 117 yards, TD
Western Michigan	Receiving	Aveion Chenault	3 receptions, 62 yards, TD
Rice	Passing	Jacurri Brown	11/18, 121 yards, TD
Rice	Rushing	Jacurri Brown	23 carries, 128 yards, TD
Rice	Receiving	Barry Jackson Jr.	4 receptions, 47 yards, TD

=== Boise State ===
Boise State Broncos (2–1) at Western Michigan Broncos (2–1) – Game summary

Quarter	1	2	3	4	Total
Boise State	8	7	10	7	32
Western Michigan	0	0	0	7	7

at Waldo Stadium • Kalamazoo, Michigan

- Date: September 26
- Game time: 3:30 p.m.
- Game weather: Sunny • Temperature: 70 °F (21 °C) • Wind: NE at 5 miles per hour (8.0 km/h)
- Game attendance: 29,700
- Referee: Rick Warne
- TV announcers (ESPN2): Jay Alter, Tom Luginbill and Lauren Sisler

Game information

First quarter

- BOIS - Matt Wagner 34-yard pass from Maddux Madsen (Zeke Martinez run for two-point conversion), 11:33. Boise State Broncos 8-0. Drive: 7 plays, 75 yards, 3:27.

Second quarter

- BOIS - Dylan Riley 5-yard run (Canaan Moore kick), 7:33. Boise State Broncos 15-0. Drive: 15 plays, 78 yards, 7:51.

Third quarter

- BOIS - Ben Ford 6-yard pass from Maddux Madsen (Canaan Moore kick), 7:22. Boise State Broncos 22-0. Drive: 7 plays, 73 yards, 3:25.
- BOIS - Canaan Moore 25-yard field goal, 0:10. Boise State Broncos 25-0. Drive: 9 plays, 52 yards, 4:41.

Fourth quarter

- BOIS - Matt Wagner 2-yard pass from Maddux Madsen (Canaan Moore kick), 7:40. Boise State Broncos 32-0. Drive: 8 plays, 38 yards, 5:00.
- WMU - Cole Cabana 2-yard run (Dieter Kelly kick), 1:03. Boise State Broncos 32-8. Drive: 5 plays, 46 yards, 1:55.

Statistics	BOIS	WMU
First downs	21	12
Plays–yards	65-377	51-223
Rushes–yards	42-173	22-113
Passing yards	204	110
Passing: comp–att–int	16–23–0	15–29–1
Turnovers	0	1
Time of possession	36:46	23:14

Team	Category	Player	Statistics
Boise State	Passing	Maddux Madsen	16/23, 204 yards, 3 TD
Boise State	Rushing	Dylan Riley	28 carries, 138 yards, TD
Boise State	Receiving	Matt Wagner	7 receptions, 94 yards, 2 TD
Western Michigan	Passing	Broc Lowry	15/28, 110 yards, INT
Western Michigan	Rushing	Trey Petty	2 carries, 41 yards
Western Michigan	Receiving	Jalen Buckley	4 receptions, 29 yards

=== at Buffalo ===
Western Michigan Broncos (2–2) at Buffalo Bulls (2–2) – Game summary

Quarter	1	2	3	4	Total
Broncos	0	0	0	0	0
Bulls	0	0	0	0	0

at Broadview Stadium • Amherst, New York

- Date: October 3
- Game time: 1:00 p.m.
- TV: ESPN+

Game information

First quarter
Second quarter
Third quarter
Fourth quarter

Statistics	WMU	BUFF
First downs		
Plays–yards		
Rushes–yards		
Passing yards		
Passing: comp–att–int		
Turnovers		
Time of possession		

Team	Category	Player	Statistics
Western Michigan	Passing		
Western Michigan	Rushing		
Western Michigan	Receiving		
Buffalo	Passing		
Buffalo	Rushing		
Buffalo	Receiving		

=== Kent State ===
Kent State Golden Flashes (2–3) at Western Michigan Broncos (3–2) – Game summary

Quarter	1	2	3	4	Total
Golden Flashes	0	0	0	0	0
Broncos	0	0	0	0	0

at Waldo Stadium • Kalamazoo, Michigan

- Date: October 10

Game information

First quarter
Second quarter
Third quarter
Fourth quarter

Statistics	KENT	WMU
First downs		
Plays–yards		
Rushes–yards		
Passing yards		
Passing: comp–att–int		
Turnovers		
Time of possession		

Team	Category	Player	Statistics
Kent State	Passing		
Kent State	Rushing		
Kent State	Receiving		
Western Michigan	Passing		
Western Michigan	Rushing		
Western Michigan	Receiving		

=== at Central Michigan (rivalry) ===
Western Michigan Broncos (4–2) at Central Michigan Chippewas (3–3) – Game summary

Quarter	1	2	3	4	Total
Broncos	0	0	0	0	0
Chippewas	0	0	0	0	0

at Kelly/Shorts Stadium • Mount Pleasant, Michigan

- Date: October 17

Game information

First quarter
Second quarter
Third quarter
Fourth quarter

Statistics	WMU	CMU
First downs		
Plays–yards		
Rushes–yards		
Passing yards		
Passing: comp–att–int		
Turnovers		
Time of possession		

Team	Category	Player	Statistics
Western Michigan	Passing		
Western Michigan	Rushing		
Western Michigan	Receiving		
Central Michigan	Passing		
Central Michigan	Rushing		
Central Michigan	Receiving		

=== at Toledo ===
Western Michigan Broncos (5–2) at Toledo Rockets (5–2) – Game summary

Quarter	1	2	3	4	Total
Broncos	0	0	0	0	0
Rockets	0	0	0	0	0

at Glass Bowl • Toledo, Ohio

- Date: October 24

Game information

First quarter
Second quarter
Third quarter
Fourth quarter

Statistics	WMU	TOL
First downs		
Plays–yards		
Rushes–yards		
Passing yards		
Passing: comp–att–int		
Turnovers		
Time of possession		

Team	Category	Player	Statistics
Western Michigan	Passing		
Western Michigan	Rushing		
Western Michigan	Receiving		
Toledo	Passing		
Toledo	Rushing		
Toledo	Receiving		

=== Bowling Green ===
Bowling Green Falcons (2–6) at Western Michigan Broncos (5–3) – Game summary

Quarter	1	2	3	4	Total
Falcons	0	0	0	0	0
Broncos	0	0	0	0	0

at Waldo Stadium • Kalamazoo, Michigan

- Date: October 31

Game information

First quarter
Second quarter
Third quarter
Fourth quarter

Statistics	BGSU	WMU
First downs		
Plays–yards		
Rushes–yards		
Passing yards		
Passing: comp–att–int		
Turnovers		
Time of possession		

Team	Category	Player	Statistics
Bowling Green	Passing		
Bowling Green	Rushing		
Bowling Green	Receiving		
Western Michigan	Passing		
Western Michigan	Rushing		
Western Michigan	Receiving		

=== at Akron ===
Western Michigan Broncos (6–3) at Akron Zips (1–8) – Game summary

Quarter	1	2	3	4	Total
Broncos	0	0	0	0	0
Zips	0	0	0	0	0

at InfoCision Stadium–Summa Field • Akron, Ohio

- Date: November 10

Game information

First quarter
Second quarter
Third quarter
Fourth quarter

Statistics	WMU	AKR
First downs		
Plays–yards		
Rushes–yards		
Passing yards		
Passing: comp–att–int		
Turnovers		
Time of possession		

Team	Category	Player	Statistics
Western Michigan	Passing		
Western Michigan	Rushing		
Western Michigan	Receiving		
Akron	Passing		
Akron	Rushing		
Akron	Receiving		

=== Eastern Michigan (Michigan MAC Trophy) ===
Eastern Michigan Eagles (4–6) at Western Michigan Broncos (7–3) – Game summary

Quarter	1	2	3	4	Total
Eagles	0	0	0	0	0
Broncos	0	0	0	0	0

at Waldo Stadium • Kalamazoo, Michigan

- Date: November 17

Game information

First quarter
Second quarter
Third quarter
Fourth quarter

Statistics	EMU	WMU
First downs		
Plays–yards		
Rushes–yards		
Passing yards		
Passing: comp–att–int		
Turnovers		
Time of possession		

Team	Category	Player	Statistics
Eastern Michigan	Passing		
Eastern Michigan	Rushing		
Eastern Michigan	Receiving		
Western Michigan	Passing		
Western Michigan	Rushing		
Western Michigan	Receiving		

=== Miami (OH) ===
Miami RedHawks (7–4) at Western Michigan Broncos (8–3) – Game summary

Quarter	1	2	3	4	Total
RedHawks	0	0	0	0	0
Broncos	0	0	0	0	0

at Waldo Stadium • Kalamazoo, Michigan

- Date: November 24

Game information

First quarter
Second quarter
Third quarter
Fourth quarter

Statistics	M-OH	WMU
First downs		
Plays–yards		
Rushes–yards		
Passing yards		
Passing: comp–att–int		
Turnovers		
Time of possession		

Team	Category	Player	Statistics
Miami (OH)	Passing		
Miami (OH)	Rushing		
Miami (OH)	Receiving		
Western Michigan	Passing		
Western Michigan	Rushing		
Western Michigan	Receiving		
