= Adam Clark (American football coach) =

American football coach (born c. 1980)

Current position
- Title: Defensive coordinator
- Team: Sacramento State
- Conference: MAC

Biographical details
- Born: c. 1980 (age 45–46); San Diego, California, U.S.
- Education: St. Ambrose University (2002)

Playing career
- 1998–1999: Grossmont
- 2000–2001: St. Ambrose
- Position: Linebacker

Coaching career (HC unless noted)
- 2002–2003: St. Ambrose (GA)
- 2004–2006: Graceland (DB/S&C)
- 2007: St. Ambrose (DC/S&C)
- 2008–2009: Colorado Mines (DL/S&C)
- 2010 (spring): Western New Mexico (DC/S&C)
- 2010–2017: Western New Mexico
- 2018: Tarleton State (AHC/ST/DL)
- 2019–2023: Angelo State (AHC/DC)
- 2024–2025: Northern Arizona (DC)
- 2026–present: Sacramento State (DC)

Head coaching record
- Overall: 33–54

Adam Clark (born c. 1980) is an American college football coach who is currently the defensive coordinator at California State University, Sacramento (Sacramento State). Clark previously served as the defensive coordinator at Northern Arizona University from 2024 to 2025 and was the head football coach at Western New Mexico University from 2010 to 2017, in which he ended his tenure with the third-highest wins in program history. He played college football as a linebacker at Grossmont College from 1998 to 1999 and St. Ambrose from 2000 to 2001.

== Coaching career ==
=== Early career ===
In 2002, Clark began his coaching career as a graduate assistant at St. Ambrose University, his alma mater. In 2004, he was hired by Graceland University as their defensive backs and strength coach.

=== St. Ambrose ===
In 2007, Clark was hired as the defensive coordinator and strength coach at St. Ambrose University.

=== Colorado Mines ===
In 2008, Clark was named the defensive line coach and strength coach at Colorado School of Mines under head coach Bob Stitt.

=== Western New Mexico ===
In February 2010, Clark was hired as the defensive coordinator and strength coach at Western New Mexico University. In May 2010, he was named the head football coach at Western New Mexico University. Clark resigned after the 2017 season and ended his tenure with the third-highest wins in program history.

=== Tarleton State ===
In 2018, Clark was named the assistant head coach, special teams coordinator and defensive line coach at Tarleton State University under head coach Todd Whitten.

=== Angelo State ===
In 2019, Clark was hired as the assistant head coach and defensive coordinator at Angelo State University under head coach Jeff Girsch.

=== Northern Arizona ===
On December 13, 2023, Clark was hired to serve as the defensive coordinator for the Northern Arizona University under head coach Brian Wright.

=== Sacramento State ===
On December 30, 2025, Clark was hired as the defensive coordinator at California State University, Sacramento (Sacramento State) under head coach Alonzo Carter.

== Personal life ==
Clark and his wife, Mimi, have two sons and one daughter. He earned his bachelor's degree in sociology from St. Ambrose University and a master's degree in organizational leadership.

== Head coaching record ==
Year	Team	Overall	Conference	Standing	Bowl/playoffs
Western New Mexico Mustangs (Rocky Mountain Athletic Conference) (2010–2015)
2010	Western New Mexico	4–7	3–6	T–6th	
2011	Western New Mexico	5–6	4–5	T–5th	
2012	Western New Mexico	4–7	3–6	T–7th	
2013	Western New Mexico	4–6	4–5	T–5th	
2014	Western New Mexico	5–6	4–5	5th	
2015	Western New Mexico	4–7	3–6	T–7th	
Western New Mexico Mustangs (Lone Star Conference) (2016–2017)
2016	Western New Mexico	3–8	3–6	8th	
2017	Western New Mexico	4–7	3–5	6th	
Western New Mexico:		33–54	27–44		
Total:		33–54			
