= Mike Jacobs (American football) =

American football coach (born 1979)

Current position
- Title: Head coach
- Team: Toledo
- Conference: MAC
- Record: 9–2

Biographical details
- Born: May 9, 1979 (age 47); Maumee, Ohio, U.S.
- Education: Ohio State University (2001); Purdue University (2008)

Playing career
- 1997–2001: Ohio State
- Positions: Offensive lineman, long snapper

Coaching career (HC unless noted)
- 2002–2003: Eastern Michigan (GA)
- 2004: Wilmington (OL)
- 2005–2007: Purdue (GA)
- 2008–2013: California (PA) (DL)
- 2014: Notre Dame (OH) (DL)
- 2015: Notre Dame (OH) (DC)
- 2016–2019: Notre Dame (OH)
- 2020–2023: Lenoir–Rhyne
- 2024–2025: Mercer
- 2026–present: Toledo

Head coaching record
- Overall: 103–25
- Tournaments: 7–4 (NCAA D-II Playoffs); 1–2 (NCAA D-I Playoffs)

Accomplishments and honors

Championships
- 2 MEC (2018, 2019); 1 SAC (2023); 3 SAC Piedmont Division (2020, 2022–2023); 2 SoCon (2024, 2025)

Awards
- MEC Coach of the Year (2018, 2019); SAC Coach of the Year (2023); SoCon Coach of the Year (2024, 2025)

Michael R. Jacobs (born May 9, 1979) is an American college football coach. He was named head football coach by the University of Toledo on December 10, 2025.

Jacobs served previously as head coach at Notre Dame (OH), an NCAA Division II program, from 2016 to 2019, Lenoir–Rhyne, also in Division II, from 2020 to 2023, and Mercer, an FCS program, in 2024 and 2025. Jacobs led all three to top-ten finishes in their respective divisions.

Prior to his first head coaching job, Jacobs served in a variety of assistant coaching roles at Eastern Michigan, Wilmington, Purdue, and California (PA). He played college football for Ohio State from 1997 to 2001, as an offensive lineman and long snapper.

== Head coaching record ==
Year	Team	Overall	Conference	Standing	Bowl/playoffs	AFCA/STATS^{#}	D2/Coaches'^{°}
Notre Dame Falcons (Mountain East Conference) (2016–2019)
2016	Notre Dame	9–2	8–2	2nd			
2017	Notre Dame	8–3	8–2	T–2nd			
2018	Notre Dame	13–1	10–0	1st	L NCAA Division II Semifinal	4	
2019	Notre Dame	12–2	9–1	1st	L NCAA Division II Quarterfinal	10	
Notre Dame:		42–8	35–5				
Lenoir–Rhyne Bears (South Atlantic Conference) (2020–2023)
2020–21	Lenoir–Rhyne	3–1	3–0	1st (Piedmont)			
2021	Lenoir–Rhyne	8–3	6–2	T–2nd	L NCAA Division II First Round		
2022	Lenoir–Rhyne	8–3	7–2	T–1st (Piedmont)			
2023	Lenoir–Rhyne	13–2	7–1	T–1st (Piedmont)	L NCAA Division II Semifinal	4	7
Lenoir–Rhyne:		32–9	23–5				
Mercer Bears (Southern Conference) (2024–2025)
2024	Mercer	11–3	7–1	1st	L NCAA Division I Quarterfinal	8	7
2025	Mercer	9–3	8–0	1st	L NCAA Division I Second Round	17	18
Mercer:		20–6	15–1				
Toledo Rockets (Mid-American Conference) (2026–present)
2026	Toledo	9–2	6–1				
Toledo:		9-2	6-1				
Total:		103–25					
National championship Conference title Conference division title or championship game berth
