= John Alan Richter =

American football player

No. 6 – Toledo Rockets
- Position: Quarterback
- Class: Senior

Personal information
- Listed height: 6 ft 3 in (1.91 m)
- Listed weight: 225 lb (102 kg)

Career information
- High school: Jones County (Gray, Georgia)
- College: Toledo (2022–present)
- Stats at ESPN

John Alan Richter is an American college football quarterback for the Toledo Rockets.

== Early life ==
Richter attended Jones County High School in Gray, Georgia. As a senior, he threw for 3,241 yards and 34 touchdowns. Richter committed to play college football at the University of Toledo.

== College career ==
Richter redshirted in 2022 and saw limited playing time in 2023. Following an injury to Tucker Gleason in 2024, Richter earned his first career start against Northern Illinois. He led the Rockets to a 13–6 victory, throwing for 152 yards. Richter entered the 2025 season as a backup but appeared in only three games after suffering an injury against Akron. He became the Rockets' starting quarterback entering the 2026 season. Richter was named MAC Offensive Player of the Week after completing 36 of 51 passes for 429 yards and four touchdowns in a 49–48 overtime victory over Temple. Against Western Michigan, he threw for 391 yards and accounted for four touchdowns in a 45–38 victory.

=== Statistics ===
College statistics
| Season | Team | Games | | | Passing | | | | | | | | Rushing | | | |
| Season | Team | GP | GS | Record | Cmp | Att | Pct | Yds | Avg | TD | Int | Rtg | Att | Yds | Avg | TD |
|---|---|---|---|---|---|---|---|---|---|---|---|---|---|---|---|---|
| 2022 | Toledo | Did not play | | | | | | | | | | | | | | |
| 2023 | Toledo | 1 | 0 | – | 3 | 4 | 75.0 | 49 | 12.3 | 0 | 0 | 177.9 | – | – | – | – |
| 2024 | Toledo | 5 | 1 | 1–0 | 43 | 67 | 64.2 | 497 | 7.4 | 4 | 0 | 146.2 | 14 | 5 | 0.4 | 0 |
| 2025 | Toledo | 3 | 0 | – | 17 | 25 | 68.0 | 153 | 6.1 | 3 | 1 | 151.0 | 4 | 15 | 3.8 | 0 |
| 2026 | Toledo | 10 | 10 | 8–2 | 195 | 298 | 65.4 | 2,501 | 8.4 | 19 | 3 | 155.0 | 30 | -4 | -0.1 | 1 |
| Career | | 19 | 11 | 9–2 | 258 | 394 | 65.5 | 3,200 | 8.1 | 26 | 4 | 153.5 | 48 | 16 | 0.3 | 1 |
