= Alonzo Carter =

American football coach (born 1968)

Current position
- Title: Head coach
- Team: Sacramento State
- Conference: MAC
- Record: 2–9

Biographical details
- Born: November 25, 1968 (age 57); Oakland, California, U.S.
- Education: California State University, Hayward

Coaching career (HC unless noted)
- 1993–1998: McClymonds HS (CA) (Assistant/DC))
- 1999–2006: McClymonds HS (CA)
- 2007–2009: Berkeley HS (CA)
- 2010–2016: Contra Costa
- 2017: San Jose State (RB)
- 2018–2020: San Jose State (RB/RC)
- 2021–2023: San Jose State (AHC/RB/RC)
- 2024–2025: Arizona (AHC/RB)
- 2026–present: Sacramento State

Head coaching record
- Overall: 2–9 (college); 47–27 (junior college); 129–69–3 (high school)

Alonzo Carter (born November 25, 1968) is an American college football coach who is the head football coach at California State University, Sacramento, a position he has held since 2026. Carter served as the associate head coach and running backs coach at the University of Arizona from 2024 to 2025.

== Early life ==
Carter was born and raised in Oakland, California and attended McClymonds High School where he played defensive back. Carter graduated from the school in 1986. Carter committed to play for Cal State Hayward. While at Cal State Hayward, Carter responded to an audition call for backup dancers by MC Hammer. Carter would later forgo his final season of college football to tour with Hammer as one of his permanent dancers from 1988 to 1993, and served as one of the main choreographers for Hammer's 1990 hit song "U Can't Touch This".

== Coaching career ==
=== McClymonds High School ===
While at McClymonds High School, Carter revived and coached its coeducational Track and field team in 1992. By April 1994, Carter turned around the program from finishing last in 1993, to winning the Oakland Athletic League (OAL) in 1994 and 1996 and sending players to the CIF championship.

During the summer time, Carter also coached at the Alameda Contra Costa Track Club (ACCTC): where high school athletes from the San Francisco Bay Area, San Joaquin Valley, and Southern California practiced to compete at the AAU Junior Olympic Games and the Arcadia Invitational Carter was also responsible for the track club's fundraising efforts to send its athletes to compete in Junior Olympic Games taking place in Houston, Baton Rouge, and Seattle.

In July 1994, Carter started his football coaching career as an assistant head coach and Defensive coordinator for the school. In 1996, Carter coached the team to its first Silver Bowl (OAL Championship Game) for the first time since 1992. Carter developed players that went onto to commit and/or earn athletic scholarships to Penn, Boise State, Northern Arizona, Utah, Sacramento State, Humboldt State, Central Methodist, Washington State, Utah State, San Diego, and Fresno State among those players included Dante Marsh. Prior to his first coaching job, the school hadn't had players earn scholarships in a while. Carter played a role in making the OAL an attractive place for college football coaches to recruit.

During his time, Carter played a role in mentoring kids that were in academic trouble or had gone through personal hardships.

=== Berkeley High School ===
In 2007, Carter was named the head football coach at Berkeley High School in Berkeley, California.

=== Contra Costa College ===
In 2010, Carter was named as the head football coach at Contra Costa College in San Pablo, California. During his time as head coach, Carter led the team to four conference titles and a pair of bowl victories. In 2012, his team won the Bay Valley Conference, in which he was named the league coach of the year as well as the CCCFA Region II Coach of the Year. He added a second BVC title the following season and then won Pacific 7 Conference titles in 2014 and 2015. The team advanced to win the Living Breath Foundation Bowl in 2012 and 2014. Carter finished his tenure at Contra Costa with a 47–27 record.

=== San Jose State ===
In January 2017, Carter was hired as the running backs coach at San Jose State University under head coach Brent Brennan.

=== Arizona ===
In January 2024, Carter was hired by the University of Arizona as their assistant head coach and running backs coach, reuniting with head coach Brent Brennan.

=== Sacramento State ===
On December 15, 2025, Carter was named the 14th head coach at California State University, Sacramento.

== Personal life ==
Carter is the third of four children. He was raised primarily by his mother, Mary Abraham, who had four children by the age of 21 and emphasized the importance of education, lessons Carter has credited as foundational to his values and career.

Carter has spoken publicly about meeting his father for the first time at the age of 23, at a time when his father was incarcerated, an experience he has described as formative in shaping his views on accountability and perseverance.

Carter became a father at the age of 17 and later had three additional children. Three of his four children have graduated from college, and his youngest daughter is on the same path as a 4.0 student. He has stated that the odds were stacked against him as a young parent and has described these experiences as influential in shaping his emphasis on mentorship, responsibility, and leadership. In addition to his own children, Carter is a father figure to many beyond his immediate family.

== Head coaching record ==
=== College ===
| Year | Team | Overall | Conference | Standing | Bowl/playoffs |
|---|---|---|---|---|---|
Sacramento State Hornets (Mid-American Conference) (2026–present)
| 2026 | Sacramento State | 2–9 | 1–7 | | |
| Sacramento State: | | 2–9 | 1–7 | | |
| Total: | | 2–9 | | | |
