= 2026 Ohio Bobcats football team =

American college football season

2026 Ohio Bobcats football
- Conference: Mid-American Conference
- Record: 8–3 (6–1 MAC)
- Head coach: John Hauser (1st season)
- Offensive coordinator: Scott Isphording (5th season)
- Offensive scheme: Spread option
- Defensive coordinator: Kurt Mattix (1st season)
- Base defense: 4–2–5
- Captains: Duncan Brune; Jack Fries; Nick Poulos; DJ Walker
- Home stadium: Peden Stadium

2026 Mid-American Conference football standings
	Conf.			Overall
Team	W		L	W		L
Ohio	6	–	1	8	–	3
Western Michigan	6	–	1	8	–	3
Buffalo	6	–	1	8	–	3
Toledo	6	–	1	9	–	2
Miami (OH)	5	–	2	7	–	4
Central Michigan	3	–	4	5	–	6
Eastern Michigan	3	–	4	4	–	7
Bowling Green	3	–	4	3	–	8
UMass	2	–	5	5	–	6
Kent State	2	–	5	3	–	8
Ball State	2	–	5	3	–	8
Akron	1	–	6	2	–	9
Sacramento State	1	–	7	2	–	9
Championship: December 5, 2026
As of November 21, 2026; Rankings from AP poll

The 2026 Ohio Bobcats football team represents Ohio University in the Mid-American Conference (MAC) during the 2026 NCAA Division I FBS football season. The Bobcats are led by John Hauser in his first year as the head coach. The Bobcats play home games at Peden Stadium, located in Athens, Ohio.

Hauser earned his first win as a head coach in the 2025 Frisco Bowl as interim coach after replacing Brian Smith This extended the Bobcats bowl game winning streak to seven. Ohio entered the season having won 13 in a row and 23 out of their last 24 at home since the turf was christened Frank Solich Field prior to the start of the 2022 season. The Bobcats were coming off of a 9 win campaign in 2025 and a program record 40 wins over the prior four seasons.

Ohio entered the season ranked 129th out of 138 FBS teams and tenth in the MAC in returning production as determined by the SP+ rankings as well as last in the nation in returning production on offense. Nick Poulos took over as the starting quarterback after a training camp battle.

Ohio managed to stay in their opening game at Nebraska until early in the fourth quarter but Nebraska's running attack rolled in the second half as Nebraska pulled away to a 49–21 victory. The Bobcats trailed most of the game the following week against Jacksonville State. After suffering injuries to Poulos, backup quarterback Matt Vezza, running back Duncan Brune, and best defender DJ Walker, getting outgained by 185 yards, and getting two field goal attempts blocked, freshman quarterback Levi Davis scored on a draw play in the 4th overtime to complete the comeback. As they has in the first two games, The Bobcats struggled to stop the run against South Alabama. They failed to overcome mounting injuries and an early seventeen point deficit and fell to the Jaguars by a score of 41–36. In their final non-conference tune up against Stonehill the Bobcats held the Skyhawks to negative rushing yards and pulled away in the second half for an easy victory.

The Bobcats survived their first MAC game and earned their first road win thanks to their defense and special teams in a 13–10 victory at Kent State. They then jumped out to a 31–0 halftime lead in their first conference home game against Central Michigan in a 31–14 homecoming victory. Ohio traveled west for a Pacicic Coast night game to take on conference newcomer Sacramento State They wasted no time taking control of the game and were able to play a lot of substitutes in an easy 48–7 victory. The program inherited the FBS's longest current home winning streak after Indiana's loss to Ohio State on Oct. 17. In their first defense of the streak, Ohio's running game struggled against Eastern Michigan. A 100-yard kickoff return by Darren James Hamilton gave Ohio the lead after an EMU touchdown gave the Eagles the lead late in the fourth quarter. A defensive stand deep in their own end in the final seconds preserved a 24–20 Ohio victory.

In their first midweek game in November, they used big plays and good red zone defense to hold off an upset by the Akron Zips. The Bobcats jumped out to a 17–0 against Miami in the Battle of the Bricks but their offense stalled in the second ,as the RedHawks scored 34 unanswered points, to hand Ohio their first conference loss. Now in need of help in the MAC Championship race, they needed to come from behind in the second half to defeat Ball State 35–28.

== Schedule ==
Date	Time	Opponent	Site	TV	Result	Attendance	Source
September 5	12:00 p.m.	at Nebraska*	Memorial Stadium; Lincoln, NE	FS1	L 21–49	85,577	
September 12	6:00 p.m.	Jacksonville State*	Peden Stadium; Athens, OH	ESPN+	W 29–27 ^{4OT}	21,037	
September 19	7:00 p.m.	at South Alabama*	Hancock Whitney Stadium; Mobile, AL	ESPN+	L 36–41	15,232	
September 26	3:30 p.m.	Stonehill*	Peden Stadium; Athens, OH	ESPN+	W 35–7	20,723	
October 3	3:30 p.m.	at Kent State	Dix Stadium; Kent, OH	ESPN+	W 13–10	13,022	
October 10	3:30 p.m.	Central Michigan^{†}	Peden Stadium; Athens, OH	ESPN+	W 31–14	21,368	
October 17	10:00 p.m.	at Sacramento State	Hornet Stadium; Sacramento, CA	ESPN+	W 48–7	17,661	
October 24	4:00 p.m.	Eastern Michigan	Peden Stadium; Athens, OH	ESPNU	W 24–20	18,813	
November 3	7:00 p.m.	at Akron	InfoCision Stadium–Summa Field; Akron, OH	ESPN2	W 28–20	5,479	
November 10	8:00 p.m.	at Miami (OH)	Yager Stadium; Oxford, OH (Battle of the Bricks)	ESPN2	L 17–34	17,156	
November 17	7:00 p.m.	Ball State	Peden Stadium; Athens, OH	CBSSN	W 35–28	12,237	
November 27	12:00 p.m.	Toledo	Peden Stadium; Athens, OH	ESPNU	–		
*Non-conference game; ^{†}Homecoming; All times are in Eastern time; Source:

== Preseason ==
The MAC Football Kickoff was held on Wednesday, July 22, 2026 at the Ford Field in Detroit, Michigan from 9:00 am EDT to 1:30 pm EDT. Ohio was represented by Head Coach John Hauser, running back Duncan Brune, and safety DJ Walker.

=== MAC coaches preseason poll ===
On July 22 the MAC announced the coaches preseason poll. Ohio was picked to finish fourth in the conference. They received zero votes to win the MAC Championship.

=== Preseason award watch lists ===
Award	Player	Position	Year	Ref
Jim Thorpe Award	DJ Walker	S	RS-Jr.	
Bednarik Award	DJ Walker	S	RS-Jr.	
Wuerffel Trophy	DJ Walker	S	RS-Jr.	

== Game summaries ==
=== at Nebraska ===
Ohio Bobcats (0–0) at Nebraska Cornhuskers (0–0) – Game summary

Quarter	1	2	3	4	Total
Bobcats	10	3	0	8	21
Cornhuskers	7	7	14	21	49

at Memorial Stadium • Lincoln, Nebraska

- Date: September 5
- Game time: 12:00 p.m. EDT
- Game weather: sunny, Temperature:91 °F (33 °C), Wind: E 5 mph (8.0 km/h)
- Game attendance: 85,577
- Referee: Bryan Banks (B10)
- TV announcers (FS1): Eric Collins (play-by-play) and Spencer Tillman (analyst)
- Ohio notes • boxscore

Game information

First quarter

- (13:49) OHIO – Riley Neer 4-yard pass from Nick Poulos (Will Hryszko kick) (Drive: 3 plays, 75 yards, 1:11, Ohio 7–0)
- (08:19) NEB – Jamal Rule 1-yard run (Kyle Cunanan kick) (Drive 12 plays, 75 yards, 5:30, Tied 7–7)
- (03:16) OHIO – Will Hryszko 42-yard field goal (Drive: 9 plays, 46 yards, 5:03, Ohio 10–7)

Second quarter

- (03:16) OHIO – Will Hryszko 45-yard field goal, (Drive: 11 plays, 51 yards, 4:53, Ohio 13–7)
- (08:13) NEB – Jamal Rule 24-yard pass from Anthony Colandrea (Kyle Cunanan kick) (Drive: 7 plays, 92 yards, 2:14, Nebraska 14–13)

Third quarter

- (04:41) NEB – Anthony Colandrea 13-yard run (Kyle Cunanan kick) (Drive: 11 plays, 73 yards, 5:21, Nebraska 21–13)
- (01:17) NEB – Mekhi Nelson 29-yard run (Kyle Cunanan kick) (Drive: 8 plays, 69yards, 2:29, Nebraska 28–13)

Fourth quarter

- (12:05) OHIO – Nick Poulos 1-yard run (Dom Dorwart pass from Nick Poulos) (Drive: 10 plays, 70 yards, 4:12, Nebraska 28–21)
- (09:10) NEB – Mekhi Nelson 51-yard pass from Anthony Colandrea (Kyle Cunanan kick), (Drive: 6 plays, 75 yards, 2:55, Nebraska 35–21)
- (05:57) NEB – Jamal Rule 11-yard run (Kyle Cunanan kick) (Drive: 5 plays, 70 yards, 2:32, Nebraska 42–21)
- (01:53) NEB – Kwazi Gilmer 9-yard pass from Anthony Colandrea (Kyle Cunanan kick) (Drive: 3 plays, 17 yards, 1:30, Nebraska 49–21)

Statistics	OHIO	NEB
First downs	17	28
Plays–yards	65–303	74–523
Rushes–yards	33–139	42–248
Passing yards	164	275
Passing: comp–att–int	14–32–1	18–32–0
Turnovers	1	0
Time of possession	29:21	30:39

Team	Category	Player	Statistics
Ohio	Passing	Nick Poulos	14/31, 164 yards, TD
Ohio	Rushing	Nick Poulos	10 carries, 72 yards, TD
Ohio	Receiving	Riley Neer	6 receptions, 104 yards, TD
Nebraska	Passing	Anthony Colandrea	18/32, 275 yards, 3 TD
Nebraska	Rushing	Jamal Rule	15 carries, 122 yards, 2 TD
Nebraska	Receiving	Mekhi Nelson	2 receptions, 65 yards, TD

This was the first time in well over 100 years of history for both programs that Ohio played Nebraska. The Cornhuskers were quarterbacked by Anthony Colandrea who transferred from UNLV and whom the Bobcats had faced in their bowl win the prior season.

The Bobcats took a quick lead as an offense returning zero started the season fast and scored on their first drive in three plays with Riley Neer on the receiving in of a touchdown pass from Nick Poulos. It didn't take long for Nebraska to answer and tied the game after a twelve play drive to tie the score. The revamped Ohio offense continued to move the ball but has to settle for field goals on their next two drives. Nebraska took their first lead with 8:13 remaining in the half when Colandrea connected with Rule for a 24-yard touchdown. Neither offense was able to do much for the remainder of the half.

After, forcing Nebraska to punt from deep in their own end, Ohio had a chance to retake the lead but failed to connect on a 44-yard field goal. Nebraska extended their lead on their final two possessions of the third quarter with a Colandrea touchdown rush and pass to take a fifteen point lead into the fourth. The Bobcats answered and got back within one score as Poulos took in himself from the 1 and a conversion pass to Dom Dorwart. Ohio entered the game as a 23.5 point underdog and were holding their own to this point. However Nebraska, holding a lead, kept the ball on the ground for most of the rest of the game and scored on their final three possessions with two more touchdown passes from Colandrea and another Rule rush sandwiched between them to win 49–21.

Ohio's defense struggled against the Power Four opponent as they surrendered 523 total yards and 248 rushing yards. Colandrea took revenge on Ohio in his second straight game against them and passed for 275 yards with 3 passing touchdowns and one more on the ground. Poulos threw for 164 yards and a touchdown in his second overall, and first start as the number one quarterback for Ohio. Jamal Rule was the offensive star for Nebraska with 122 rushing yards with two rushing and one receiving touchdown. Riley Neer was a star for Ohio in his first start with 104 receiving yards and a touchdown.

=== vs Jacksonville State ===
Jacksonville State Gamecocks (1–1) at Ohio Bobcats (0–1) – Game summary

Quarter	1	2	3	4	OT	2OT	3OT	4OT	Total
Gamecocks	7	10	7	0	0	3	0	0	27
Bobcats	0	14	0	10	0	3	0	2	29

at Peden Stadium • Athens, Ohio

- Date: September 12
- Game time: 6:00 p.m. EDT
- Game weather: cloudy, Temperature:80 °F (27 °C), Wind:CALM 0 mph (0 km/h)
- Game attendance: 21,037
- Referee: Marcel Kerr (MAC)
- TV announcers (ESPN+): Joe Tordy (play-by-play) and LaDarrin McLane (analyst)
- Ohio notes • boxscore

Game information

First quarter

- (04:54) JVST – Caden Creel 8-yard run (Garrison Rippa kick) (Drive: 13 plays, 88 yards, 6:33, Jacksonville State 7–0)

Second quarter

- (14:36) JVST – Luke Gilbert 82-yard pass from Caden Creel (Garrison Rippa kick) (Drive: 1 play, 82 yards, 0:12, Jacksonville State 14–0)
- (07:28) OHIO – Riley Neer 8-yard pass from Matt Vezza (Brack Peacock kick) (Drive: 13 plays, 65 yards, 7:08, Jacksonville State 14–7)
- (00:57) JVST – Garrison Rippa 22-yard field goal (Drive: 14 plays, 71 yards, 6:31, Jacksonville State 17–7)
- (00:44) OHIO – Darren James-Hamilton 98-yard kickoff return (Will Hryszko kick) (Jacksonville State 17–14)

Third quarter

- (07:57) JVST – Lando Khristian 4-yard run (Garrison Rippa kick) (Drive: 14 plays, 73 yards, 6:56, Jacksonville State 24–14)

Fourth quarter

- (14:57) OHIO – Will Hryszko 23-yard field goal (Drive: 13 plays, 70 yards, 8:00, Jacksonville State 24–17)
- (01:34) OHIO – Victor Rosa 1-yard run (Will Hryszko kick) (Drive: 18 plays, 90 yards, 8:50, Tied 24–24)

First overtime

- No scoring plays.

Second overtime

- (00:00) OHIO - Will Hryszko 43-yard field goal (Drive: 4 plays, 0 yards, 0:00, Ohio 27–24)
- (00:00) JVST – Garrison Rippa 28-yard field goal (Drive: 6 plays, 15 yards, 6:31, Tied 27–27)

Third overtime

- No scoring plays.

Fourth overtime

- (00:00) OHIO – (Levi Davis run) (Ohio 29–27)

Statistics	JVST	OHIO
First downs	22	17
Total yards	72–447	66–262
Rushing yards	46–161	46–165
Passing yards	286	97
Passing: Comp–Att–Int	20–26–0	13–20–0
Turnovers	1	0
Time of possession	28:25	31:35

Team	Category	Player	Statistics
Jacksonville State	Passing	Caden Creel	18/24, 265 yards, TD
Jacksonville State	Rushing	Caden Creel	29 carries, 120 yards, TD
Jacksonville State	Receiving	Luke Gilbert	1 reception, 82 yards, TD
Ohio	Passing	Matt Vezza	10/12, 80 yards, TD
Ohio	Rushing	Matt Vezza	12 carries, 67 yards
Ohio	Receiving	Riley Neer	4 receptions, 38 yards, TD

This was Ohio's second all-time meeting with Jacksonville State. Ohio won the first matchup two seasons ago in the 2024 Cure Bowl when they met as champions of their respective conferences.

The Gamecock offense controlled the game early. After a Bobcat punt to open the game, their offense marched on a 13-play 88-yard drive culminating in an 8-yard rush by quarterback Caden Creel. After the teams exchanging punts for three possessions they scored in a much faster fashion when Creel hit tight end Luke Gilbert for an 82-yard completion on the drives first play early in the second quarter. Ohio responded with a 13-play drive of their own. Matt Vezza, in relief of Nick Poulos who was injured on a targeting penalty early in the game, hit Riley Neer for a touchdown. Ohio's defense held Jacksonville State to a long field goal attempt on the ensuing drive when the ball slipped through holder Carter Lewis's hands. Lewis was able to recover and complete a pass to Angel Toombs for a first down. The drive finally ended on the drive's 14th play with a field goal to put the Gamecocks up 10 with 57 seconds remaining in the half. Darren James-Hamilton got the Bobcats close before the half when he returned the ensuing kickoff for a touchdown. Creel fumbled of the first play of the next drive but Ohio's field goal attempt on the final play was blocked.

Jacksonville State opened the half with another 14-play possession. Kristian Lando scored on a 4-yard pitch to extend the lead back to 10. Ohio followed with 13-play drive that consumed 8:00 but could only manage a Will Hryszko 23-yard field goal early in the fourth quarter. After a Gamecock punt. Ohio went on a 18-play touchdown drive that ate most of the remaining game time. Quarterback Levi Davis, now in relief of an injured Vezza scrambled to the 1 an then Victor Rosa tied the game with a 1-yard plunge with 1:34 remaining. JSU got managed 11-plays in the final drive but missed what would have been a game winning 38-yard field goal.

JSU chose to go for it an failed on a 4th an 2 in overtime as Creel's run was stuffed. Ohio's offense only managed one yard on their possession and the winning field goal attempt was blocked. They exchanged field goals in the second overtime and both failed on their conversions in the third. Davis scored on a draw play to start the fourth. A procedure call made the Gamecocks attempt a conversion from the 8-yard line. Creel completed a pass but James-Hamilton made a game saving tackle at the 1-yard line to win the game for the Bobcats.

Creel was the games statistical star as he completed 18 passes for 265 yards and rushed for 120 yards. Ohio was outgained by 185 yards, forced to use three quarterbacks and suffered several other key injuries, had two field goals blocked, barely moved the ball at all in overtime but somehow won a game that featured a second half rain storm, bizzare plays, and multiple long drives by both teams.

=== at South Alabama ===
Ohio Bobcats (1–1) at South Alabama Jaguars (1–1) – Game summary

Quarter	1	2	3	4	Total
Bobcats	7	0	14	15	36
Jaguars	14	10	7	10	41

at Hancock Whitney Stadium • Mobile, Alabama

- Date: September 19
- Game time: 7:00 p.m. EDT
- Game weather: sunny, Temperature:90 °F (32 °C), Wind: CALM 0 mph (0 km/h)
- Game attendance: 15,232
- Referee: Billy Williams (MAC)
- TV announcers (ESPN+): Pat Greenwood (play-by-play) and Brian Genard (analyst)
- Ohio notes • boxscore

Game information

First quarter

- (12:07) USA – Keenan Phillips 6-yard run (Davis Little kick) (Drive: 7 plays, 75 yards, 2:53; South Alabama 7–0)
- (04:37) OHIO – Riley Neer 5-yard pass from Matt Vezza (Will Hryszko kick) (Drive: 13 plays, 78 yards, 7:26; Tied 7–7)
- (01:39) USA – Rod Gibbs 34-yard pass from Jared Hollins (Davis Little kick) (Drive: 6 plays, 75 yards, 2:58; South Alabama 14–7)

Second quarter

- (14:24) USA – Trae'von Dunbar 32-yard run (Davis Little kick) (Drive: 2 plays, 36 yards, 0:29; South Alabama 21–7)
- (00:52) USA – Davis Little 32-yard field goal (Drive: 18 plays, 66 yards, 7:57; South Alabama 24–7)

Third quarter

- (13:59) OHIO – Victor Rosa 33-yard run (Will Hryszko kick) (Drive: 2 plays, 41 yards, 0:50; South Alabama 24–14)
- (12:09) OHIO – Riley Neer 9-yard pass from Matt Vezza (Will Hryszko kick) (Drive: 2 plays, 25 yards, 0:30; South Alabama 24–21)
- (08:05) USA – PJ Martin 1-yard run (Davis Little kick) (Drive: 10 plays, 75 yards, 4:04; South Alabama 31–21)

Fourth quarter

- (08:21) USA – Trae'von Dunbar 5-yard run (Davis Little kick) (Drive: 14 plays, 81 yards, 7:53; South Alabama 38–21)
- (05:20) OHIO – AJ Miller 10-yard pass from Levi Davi (AJ Miller pass from Levi Davis) (Drive: 9 plays, 63 yards, 2:51; South Alabama 38–29)
- (01:10) USA – Davis Little 21-yard field goal (Drive: 4 plays, 7 yards, 1:37; South Alabama 41–29)
- (00:00) OHIO – Dom Dorwart 21-yard pass from Levi Davis (Will Hryszko kick) (Drive: 6 plays, 70 yards, 1:05; South Alabama 41–36)

Statistics	OHIO	USA
First downs	22	21
Total yards	59–387	70–458
Rushing yards	28–153	50–266
Passing yards	234	192
Passing: Comp–Att–Int	21–31–1	13–20–0
Turnovers	2	0
Time of possession	27:30	32:30

Team	Category	Player	Statistics
Ohio	Passing	Levi Davis	9/15, 121 yards, 2 TD
Ohio	Rushing	Victor Rosa	13 carries, 78 yards, TD
Ohio	Receiving	Dom Dorwart	5 receptions, 61 yards, TD
South Alabama	Passing	Jared Hollins	13/20, 192 yards, TD
South Alabama	Rushing	Keenan Phillips	18 carries, 116 yards, TD
South Alabama	Receiving	Jeremiah Jones-Thomas	6 receptions, 74 yards

This was Ohio's second all-time meeting with South Alabama. Ohio won the first matchup 27–20 in 2024 Both teams were forced to start backup quarterbacks. Jared Hollins started for South Alabama in lieu of Bishop Davenport. Ohio started Matt Vezza at quarterback and was without starting back Duncan Brune, and several starters on defense.

The Jaguars marched right down the field and scored on an Keenan Phillips touchdown run on their first drive. The Bobcats matched with a methodical 13-play drive ending in a Riley Neer touchdown catch from Vezza. South Alabama had no trouble regaining the lead as on the ensuing drive Hollins hit Rod Gibbs with a touchdown pass. Vezza was intercepted early in the second quarter and the Jaguars found the endzone again two plays later on a Trae'von Dunbar 32-yard rush. Ohio reached the USA 2-yard line on their next drive but were forced to sub out at center for one play. The snap hit Vezza in the leg and the ball was recovered in endzone by South Alabama for a touchback. The Jaguars held the ball for 18-plays and kicked a field goal just before the half ended.

Ohio wasted no time getting back in the game early in the second half. Darren James-Hamilton's kickoff return set the Bobcat's up with good field position. Victor Rosa scored from 33-yards out on the second play. After a Jaguar three-and-out Vezza found Neer again to get within three on the second play of their next drive. The Jaguars responded with a 10-play touchdown drive to retake a ten point lead. After a series of punts, they went up again by 17 after a 14-play touchdown drive early in the fourth quarter. Levi Davis entered in relief of Vezza and led a touchdown drive culminating in a touchdown pass to tight end AJ Miller. Miller got the Bobcats within nine on the two-point conversion. Ohio's defense held but the Jaguar defense stopped Ohio on a 4th down deep in Ohio territory. Ohio's defense held them to a field goal. Dom Dorwart caught a touchdown pass on the ensuing drive from Davis but an onside kick attempt failed on South Alabama ran out the clock.

The Bobcats were outgained, for the third straight game, by a total of 458 to 387. Hollins threw for 192 yards and a touchdown for South Alabama. Ohio continued to have issues stopping the run. USA used three different backs, led by Phillips' 116 yards, to total 266 rushing yards and four touchdowns for the game. Levi Davis 121 made him the Bobcats' third different leading passer in three games. Rosa got his first start for Ohio and rushed for 78 yards and a touchdown. Michael Molnar easily led all defenders with 16 tackles for the Bobcats.

=== vs Stonehill (FCS) ===
Stonehill Skyhawks (FCS) (1–3) at Ohio Bobcats (1–2) – Game summary

Quarter	1	2	3	4	Total
Skyhawks (FCS)	0	7	0	0	7
Bobcats	7	7	14	7	35

at Peden Stadium • Athens, Ohio

- Date: September 26
- Game time: 3:30 p.m. EDT
- Game weather: sunny, Temperature:70 °F (21 °C), Wind: N 7 mph (11 km/h)
- Game attendance: 20,723
- Referee: David Hergert (MAC)
- TV announcers (ESPN+): Bill Spaulding (play-by-play) and Doc Holliday (analyst)
- Ohio notes • boxscore

Game information

First quarter

- (01:46) OHIO – Matt Vezza 18-yard run (Will Hryszko kick) (Drive: 14 plays, 76 yards, 7:35, Ohio 7–0)

Second quarter

- (13:25) STO – Cole Clarke 32-yard pass from Jack O'Connell (Derek Varley kick) (Drive: 7 plays, 65 yards, 3:21, Tied 7–7)
- (08:15) OHIO – Victor Rosa 4-yard run (Will Hryszko kick) (Drive: 10 plays, 74 yards, 5:15, Ohio 14–7)

Third quarter

- (08:01) OHIO – Dom Dorwart 42-yard pass from Matt Vezza (Will Hryszko kick) (Drive: 5 plays, 73 yards, 2:13; Ohio 21–7)
- (04:27) OHIO – Matt Vezza 1-yard run (Will Hryszko kick) (Drive: 3 plays, 67 yards, 1:32, Ohio 28–7)

Fourth quarter

- (07:13) OHIO – Victor Rosa 6-yard run (Will Hryszko kick) (Drive: 10 plays, 69 yards, 6:14, Ohio 35–7)

Statistics	STO	OHIO
First downs	7	24
Plays–yards	38–124	71–523
Rushes–yards	18–-1	50–301
Passing yards	125	222
Passing: Comp–Att–Int	12–19–0	15–21–1
Turnovers	0	1
Time of possession	20:40	39:20

Team	Category	Player	Statistics
Stonehill	Passing	Jack O'Connell	11/18, 117 yards, TD
Stonehill	Rushing	Rayshaun King	3 carries, 8 yards
Stonehill	Receiving	Cole Clarke	5 receptions, 64 yards, TD
Ohio	Passing	Matt Vezza	14/21, 2077 yards, TD, INT
Ohio	Rushing	Irving Brown	8 carries, 97 yards
Ohio	Receiving	Riley Neer	5 receptions, 113 yards

Stonehill moved up to the NCAA Division I Football Championship Subdivision in 2022 This was the first meeting between the two programs.

Ohio reached the Stonehill 23-yard line on their first possession but were stopped on a fourth down. After a Stonehill three-and-out, the Bobcats went on a 14-play, 76-yard drive that ate up 7 minutes and 35 seconds of game clock that included two successful fourth down conversions. Matt Vezza capped off the drive by scrambling for an 18-yard rushing touchdown. The Skyhawks found some offense on their second possession where on a 4th and 8 Jack O'Connell connected on a 32-yard touchdown pass to Cole Clarke. The Bobcats responded with a methodical 10-play, 74-yard drive that took 5 minutes and 10 seconds off the clock ending in a Victor Rosa touchdown rush. After a Stonehill three-and-out, Ohio held the ball for 11-plays but Vezza’s 3rd and goal pass was intercepted by Christopher Gill. Stonehill ran out the remainder of the half.

Stonehill was held to another three-and-out to begin the second half. Matt Vezza found Dom Dorwart for a 42-yard touchdown on the ensuing drive to put Ohio up 21–7. Stonehill was forced to quickly punt again. Irving Brown set Ohio up with a 1st and goal on the first play of the following drive with a 60-yard rush. Vezza punched it in two plays later. Stonehill managed to move the ball into Bobcat territory on the ensuing drive but a fourth down pass fell incomplete. Ohio then kept the ball of the ground for all 10 plays of another time consuming drive ending in a second touchdown for Rosa. They ran out the clock after another Stonehill punt to seal the victory.

After struggling to stop the run early in the season, the Bobcat defense held the Skyhawks to -1 yards rushing and 124 total yards. Ohio held possession for 39:20 minutes and ran up 523 yards of offense. Vezza, starting his second straight game for an injured Nick Poulos, threw for 204 yards and a touchdown. Freshman Irving Brown had his best day as a Bobcat netting 97 rushing yards to lead Ohio while Rose scored two touchdowns on the ground. Riley Neer once again led Ohio with 113 receiving yards.

=== at Kent State ===
Ohio Bobcats (2–2) at Kent State Golden Flashes (2–2) – Game summary

Quarter	1	2	3	4	Total
Bobcats	3	7	3	0	13
Golden Flashes	0	3	7	0	10

at Dix Stadium • Kent, Ohio

- Date: October 3
- Game time: 3:30 EDT
- Game weather: sunny, Temperature:65 °F (18 °C), Wind: NE 7 mph (11 km/h)
- Game attendance: 13,022
- Referee: Chris La Mange (MAC)
- TV announcers (ESPN+): Michael Reghi (play-by-play) Ryan Cavanaugh (analyst)
- Ohio notes • boxscore

Game information

First quarter

- (03:27) OHIO – Will Hryszko 40-yard field goal (Drive: 5 plays, 14 yards, 2:30, Ohio 3–0)

Second quarter

- (12:00) KENT – Sean Leonard 24-yard field goal (Drive: 14 plays, 80 yards, 6:22, Tied 3–0)
- (03:46) OHIO – Matt Vezza 35-yard run (Will Hryszko kick) (Drive: 5 plays, 46 yards, 2:20, Ohio 10–3)

Third quarter

- (06:52) KENT – Mason King 1-yard run (Sean Leonard kick) (Drive: 9 plays, 59 yards, 5:01, Tied 10–10)
- (00:15) OHIO – Will Hryszko 44-yard field goal (Drive: 12 plays, 54 yards, 6:34, Ohio 13–10)

Fourth quarter

Statistics	OHIO	KENT
First downs	15	18
Total yards	54–253	66–266
Rushing yards	40–181	31–49
Passing yards	72	217
Passing: Comp–Att–Int	8–14–0	20–35–2
Time of possession	28:45	30:29

Team	Category	Player	Statistics
Ohio	Passing	Matt Vezza	4/9, 39 yards
Ohio	Rushing	Duncan Brune	18 carries, 86 yards
Ohio	Receiving	Riley Neer	2 receptions, 22 yards
Kent State	Passing	Dru DeShields	20/35, 217 yards, 2 INT
Kent State	Rushing	Brandon White	9 carries, 32 yards
Kent State	Receiving	Da'Realyst Clark	6 receptions, 68 yards

Ohio opened MAC play against Kent State. The two teams last met in 2024 with the Bobcats winning 41–0. Both teams came in at 2–2 with KSU having won their MAC opener against Ball State the prior week.

Opening what turned out to be a defensive slog, Ohio punted on their first possession. Kent State moved into field goal range but a personal foul pushed them back forced them to punt. Caleb Chamberlain blocked the punt and set up the Bobcats in good field position. A 40-yard Will Hryszko field goal gave the Bobcats first blood late in the first quarter. Kent State responded with a 14-play, 80 yard drive that stalled at the Ohio 7 where Sean Leonard tied the game with his own field goal. Ohio drove into Kent State territory but a fumble on a pass completion ended their chance. Kent State gave the ball right back when Dru DeShields was intercepted by Michael Molnar to give Ohio the ball in Kent State territory. After gaining one first down, Matt Vezza was sacked and recovered his own fumble for a 20-yard loss. Two plays later Vezza scrambled 35-yards to regain the lead. Kent State was forced to punt and Ohio ran out the first half.

DeShields was intercepted by Kendall Bannister on the third play of the second half. The Bobcats failed to capitalize when Vezza fumbled again on the ensuing drive. A 47-yard reception from DeShields to Ardell banks on the following drive's first play set the Golden Flashes up on the Ohio 12. An 8-yard rush by Brandon White moved the ball to the 4-yard line. Kent State was stopped on two plays but converted on a 4th and 1. They were stuffed again on three straight rushes before Mason King found paydirt on a fourth down attempt form one yard out to tie the game. Levi Davis relieved Vezza as Ohio held the ball for 12-plays before Hryszko gave the Bobcats the lead again late in the third quarter with another field goal. The Golden Flashes pushed into Ohio territory early in the fourth but a field goal was blocked by Jack Fries to preserve the lead. After the teams exchanged punts, Ohio took possession with 5:44 remaining. They gained one first down, but after Davis was stopped on a 3rd and 2 at the Kent 40 elected to go for it. Duncan Brune's fourth down rush was stuffed to give Kent State the ball with good field position with 2:30 remaining. A pass interference call on the Bobcats on a fourth down on the first series kept hope alive for Kent. After converting on a 3rd and 8 on the next series they faced a fourth down at the Bobcat 15 with just 0:10 remaining. Leonard's 32-yard field goal attempt sailed wide. Ohio ran out the clock to preserve the win.

Kent State edged Ohio in total yards by just 13. For the second straight game, Ohio shut down the opponent's run game as they held Kent State to 49 yards. Duncan Brune, returning from injury, led all rushers with 86 yard. Kent State conversely held the two Ohio quarterbacks to a combined 72 passing yards. Deshields threw for 217 yards for the Golden Flashes but his two interceptions were key to the end result. Linebacker Jack Fries led all defenders with 10 tackles and a blocked field goal for the Bobcats. Molnar contributed 8 tackles and an interception.

=== vs Central Michigan ===
Central Michigan Chippewas (3–2) at Ohio Bobcats (3–2) – Game summary

Quarter	1	2	3	4	Total
Chippewas	0	0	7	7	14
Bobcats	14	17	0	0	31

at Peden Stadium • Athens, Ohio

- Date: October 10
- Game time: 3:30 p.m. EDT
- Game weather: cloudy, Temperature:61 °F (16 °C), Wind: E 5 mph (8.0 km/h)
- Game attendance: 21,368
- Referee: Matt Packowski (MAC)
- TV announcers (ESPN+): Jason Ross (play-by-play) and Tyoka Jackson (analyst)
- Ohio notes • boxscore

Game information

First quarter

- (11:01) OHIO – Duncan Brune 23-yard run (Will Hryszko kick) (Drive: 8 plays, 70 yards, 3:54, Ohio 7–0)
- (00:39) OHIO – Riley Neer 3-yard pass from Nick Poulos (Will Hryszko kick) (Drive: 8 plays, 65 yards, 7:58; Ohio 14–0)

Second quarter

- (10:28) OHIO – Will Hryszko 24-yard field goal (Drive: 9 plays, 52 yards, 3:32, Ohio 17–0)
- (05:24) OHIO – Preston Bowman 1-yard pass from Nick Poulos (Will Hryszko kick) (Drive: 8 plays, 35 yards, 4:06; Ohio 24–0)
- (00:06) OHIO – Dom Dorwart 44-yard pass from Nick Poulos (Will Hryszko kick) (Drive: 3 plays, 62 yards, 0:30; Ohio 31–0)

Third quarter

- (00:25) CMU – Jayden Clerveaux 15-yard run (Caden VanHuis kick) (Drive: 8 plays, 73 yards, 3:40; Ohio 31–7)

Fourth quarter

- (01:39) CMU – Nick Woodford 15-yard run (Caden VanHuis kick) (Drive: 8 plays, 79 yards, 3:29; Ohio 31–14)

Statistics	CMU	OHIO
First downs	14	23
Total yards	56–275	68–403
Rushing yards	32–121	50–245
Passing yards	154	158
Passing: Comp–Att–Int	17–24–0	11–18–0
Time of possession	26:04	33:56

Team	Category	Player	Statistics
Central Michigan	Passing	Angel Flores	14/20, 112 yards
Central Michigan	Rushing	Nick Woodford	3 carries, 27 yards, TD
Central Michigan	Receiving	Braylen Naves	4 receptions, 56 yards
Ohio	Passing	Nick Poulos	11/18, 158 yards, 3 TD
Ohio	Rushing	Duncan Brune	16 carries, 91 yards, TD
Ohio	Receiving	Riley Neer	4 receptions, 59 yards, TD

Ohio hosted Central Michigan for homecoming Ohio trailed the all-time series against the Chippewas by a lopsided 27–7 margin but the Bobcats had won the last two meetings.

Ohio received the opening kickoff. Nick Poulos took the field at quarterback for the first time since suffering a concussion early in the second game of the season. Facing a 3rd and 6 on the first series, an apparent interception was called back on a pass interference call. Ohio took advantage behind the running of Duncan Brune who carried for 47 yards on the drive and finished it with a 23-yard touchdown rush on another third down. Central Michigan moved to the Ohio 34 on their first possession but a failed 4th and 1 attempt returned possession to the Bobcats. On the eighth play of the ensuing drive Poulos found Riley Neer for a three yard touchdown receptions to put Ohio up by two scores. After a CMU three-and-out, a CMU punt set Ohio up at the CMU 41. Will Hryszko connected a 24-yard field goal nine plays later, extending Ohio's lead to 17-0. Now down three scores and facing a third down on the first series of the ensuing drive, Angel Flores dropped back to pass. Michael Molnar sackied Flores and forced a fumble that was recovered by Ty Neubert at the Central Michigan 35-yard line. After 7 straight rushes to start the drive and move the Bobcats to the 1-yard line, Poulos connected on his second touchdown when he found Preston Bowman in the endzone with 5:24 left in the half. Another quick stop by Ohio's defense gave the Bobcat offense a chance to extend the lead even further before the half. Ohio moved into the red zone behind the running of Victor Rosa when a failed exchange between he and Poulos was recovered by the Chippewas' J.J. Douglas at the 19-yard line. Still down 24–0 with 1:22 remaining CMU turned from their normally run heavy offense and looked to pass. However, Ohio's defense forced another three-and-out. With the offense setup and their own 38 with just 0:36 on the clock, two rushes moved Ohio into CMU territory with 13 seconds remaining. Poulos connected on his third touchdown and gave Ohio a commanding lead going into the half when he launched a 44-yard touchdown pass to Dom Dorwart to the deep right.

After a cloudy and drizzly first half, the remnants of Hurricane Isaias and a surprisingly lopsided 31–0 score where Ohio entered as only a 2½ point favorite, turned the third quarter into a more rainy slog. CMU punted on their first three possessions while Ohio fumbled on their first and punted on their next two. The Chips finally got on the scoreboard on their fourth possession late in the quarter when Jayden Clerveaux rushed for a 15-yard touchdown run. The teams kept exchanging punts on the next three possessions. Nick Woodford made the final 31–14 with a 20-yard touchdown run late in the fourth before the Bobcats ran out the clock.

Ohio outgained Central Michigan by a 403 to 275 margin. Ohio's rush defense did a good job of shutting down CMU's run heavy offense in the first half where they were held to 78 total yards and just 19 yards rushing. Continuing a trend over the last three games, they were held to just 121 for the game. Ohio's run game combined for 245 yards. Brune led the way with 91 yards and a touchdown. Poulos threw for three touchdowns and 158 yards and added 52 yards on the ground. Neer again led the Bobcats with 59 receiving yards. Flores was held to 112 passing yards and just 27 rushing. Ohio freshman linebacker Jermaine Minnis led all tacklers with twelve. Molnar's five tackles, two sacks, and forced fumble earned him MAC Defensive Player of the Week. This marked Ohio's 16th straight victory at home.

=== at Sacramento State ===
Ohio Bobcats (4–2) at Sacramento State Hornets (1–5) – Game summary

Quarter	1	2	3	4	Total
Bobcats	7	20	14	7	48
Hornets	0	0	0	7	7

at Hornet Stadium • Sacramento, California

- Date: October 17
- Game time: 10:00 p.m. EDT
- Game weather: sunny, Temperature:68 °F (20 °C), Wind: NW 3 mph (4.8 km/h)
- Game attendance: 17,661
- Referee: Rick Warne (MAC)
- TV announcers (ESPN+): Chris Sylvester (play-by-play) and Doc Holliday (analyst)
- Ohio notes • boxscore

Game information

First quarter

- (05:35) OHIO – Duncan Brune 3-yard run (Will Hryszko kick) (Drive: 11 plays, 82 yards, 5:58, Ohio 7–0)

Second quarter

- (14:56) OHIO – Will Hryszko 50-yard field goal (Drive: 7 plays, 45 yards, 3:03, Ohio 10–0)
- (09:35) OHIO – Victor Rosa 16-yard run (Will Hryszko kick) (Drive: 4 plays, 71 yards, 2:10, Ohio 17–0)
- (07:54) OHIO – Will Hryszko 37-yard field goal (Drive: 4 plays, 7 yards, 1:31, Ohio 20–0)
- (01:50) OHIO – Duncan Brune 14-yard run (Will Hryszko kick) (Drive: 10 plays, 76 yards, 4:39, Ohio 27–0)

Third quarter

- (05:24) OHIO – Preston Bowman 67-yard pass from Nick Poulos (Will Hryszko kick) (Drive: 4 plays, 84 yards, 2:02; Ohio 34–0)
- (00:45) OHIO – Levi Davis 14-yard run (Will Hryszko kick) (Drive: 9 plays, 71 yards, 4:55, Ohio 41–0)

Fourth quarter

- (12:24) SAC – Kenyon Shabazz 67-yard pass from Brian Salazar Jr. (Grant Meadors kick) (Drive: 6 plays, 75 yards, 3:21; Ohio 41–7)
- (03:07) OHIO – Irving Brown 2-yard run (Will Hryszko kick) (Drive: 9 plays, 82 yards, 5:12, Ohio 48–7)

Statistics	OHIO	SAC
First downs	30	13
Total yards	64–468	52–267
Rushing yards	42–265	26–127
Passing yards	203	140
Passing: Comp–Att–Int	15–22–0	15–26–1
Time of possession	33:11	26:49

Team	Category	Player	Statistics
Ohio	Passing	Nick Poulos	11/14, 165 yards, TD
Ohio	Rushing	Irving Brown	8 carries, 87 yards, TD
Ohio	Receiving	Preston Bowman	3 receptions, 94 yards, TD
Sacramento State	Passing	Brian Salazar Jr.	4/5, 71 yards, TD
Sacramento State	Rushing	Isaiah Ene	7 carries, 59 yards
Sacramento State	Receiving	Kenyon Shabazz	2 receptions, 46 yards, TD

Ohio took on Sacramento State in a Pacific Time Zone night game. This was the first ever meeting between the two programs. The Hornets entered the game 0–4 in the MAC with their only one win over FCS Mississippi Valley State on the season.

After an opening Hornet punt, Ohio marched 11 plays for the opening score as Duncan Brune scored on a 3-yard rush. Ohio's defense held, but the ensuing Bobcat drive stalled at the Hornet 33 where Will Hryszko converted on a career long 50-yard field goal on the first play of the 2nd quarter. Sacramento State was forced to punt again, and after being aided by a pair of pass interference calls, Victor Rosa put Ohio up three scores when he found paydirt from 16-yards out. Jackson Sharman was intercepted by Barry Dillon on the first play of the next drive and set up Ohio on the Hornet 26. The Bobcats could not capitalize and had to settle for another field goal. Sacramento State went three-and-out. Ohio's offense took advantage with a 10-play drive that consumed most of the remainder of the half. Brune put Ohio up 27–0 with 1:05 remaining with his second rushing touchdown of the game.

Ohio wasted no time in putting the game almost out of reach when Nick Poulos hit Preston Bowman on a 67-yard strike. The Hornets were forced into another quick punt. The Bobcat's made wholesale changes but went three-and-out with Matt Vezza now at quarterback. Sacramento State also swapped quarterbacks and moved into field goal range behind Brian Salazar Jr. but could not get on the board when a 47-yard field goal attempt failed. Ohio then held the ball for 9-plays with Levi Davis now under center. Davis scored a 14-yard draw to put the Bobcats up 41–0 with 0:45 remaining in the third quarter. With many backups in for both teams, Ohio's defense could not preserve a shutout. Salazar hit Kenyon Shabazz to but the Hornet's on the board. With Vezza under center again, Ohio was forced to punt again. Sacramento State reached the Bobcat 16 on the ensuing drive but were stopped short on a 4th and 1. Ohio continued to rotate quarterbacks with Matt Pappas getting his chance at quarterback but Ohio moved the ball mostly behind Irving Brown and Mike Taylor. Brown's 50-yard scamper put Ohio on the Hornet 2 and he provided the games final margin on the next play to put the Bobcats up 48–7 with 3:07 remaining. Ohio ran out the clock after a Hornet punt to secure the victory.

The Bobcats outgained the Hornets by a margin of 468 to 267. With the lopsided score both teams used a lot of substitutions. Ohio had eight players record a rush led by Brown's 87 yards and Brune's 55 yards and two early touchdowns. Poulos threw for 165 yards and a touchdown in just over a half of play to lead all passers as the teams combined in putting six different players under center. Bowman's long touchdown helped him lead all receivers with 94 yards. Boogsie Silvera of the Hornets led all players with 8 tackles. Darren James-Hamilton led the Bobcats with 6. Michael Molnar had three tackles and a sack for Ohio. Both teams had 25 players record at least 1 tackle. It was the Bobcat's fourth straight win and the Hornet's fifth straight loss.

=== vs Eastern Michigan ===
Eastern Michigan Eagles (4–4) at Ohio Bobcats (5–2) – Game summary

Quarter	1	2	3	4	Total
Eagles	0	13	0	7	20
Bobcats	7	3	7	7	24

at Peden Stadium • Athens, Ohio

- Date: October 24
- Game time: 4:00 p.m. EDT
- Game weather: sunny, Temperature:65 °F (18 °C), Wind: SW 3 mph (4.8 km/h)
- Game attendance: 18,813
- Referee: Rich Edwards (MAC)
- TV announcers (ESPNU): Doug Sherman (play-by-play) and Tyoka Jackson (analyst)
- Ohio notes • boxscore

Game information

First quarter

- (05:48) OHIO – Dom Dorwart 78-yard pass from Nick Poulos (Will Hryszko kick) (Drive: 2 plays, 80 yards, 0:51; Ohio 7–0)

Second quarter

- (12:57) EMU – Aaron Kearse 25-yard fumble return (Rudy Kessinger kick) (Tied 7–7)
- (04:49) OHIO – Rudy Kessinger 31-yard field goal (Drive: 6 plays, 19 yards, 2:32, Eastern Michigan 10–3)
- (01:39) OHIO – Will Hryszko 49-yard field goal (Drive: 8 plays, 42 yards, 3:10, Tied 10–10)
- (00:00) EMU – Rudy Kessinger 41-yard field goal (Drive: 7 plays, 52 yards, 1:39, Eastern Michigan 13–10)

Third quarter

- (03:53) OHIO – Nick Poulos 1-yard run (Will Hryszko kick) (Drive: 6 plays, 78 yards, 3:21, Ohio 17–13)

Fourth quarter

- (03:53) EMU – Joey Mattord 24-yard pass from Brogan McCaughey (Rudy Kessinger kick) (Drive: 8 plays, 98 yards, 4:12; Eastern Michigan 20–17)
- (03:40) OHIO – Darren James-Hamilton 100-yard kickoff return (Will Hryszko kick) (Ohio 24–20)

Statistics	EMU	OHIO
First downs	18	17
Total yards	67–307	54–356
Rushing yards	28–110	25–90
Passing yards	197	266
Passing: Comp–Att–Int	27–39–1	19–29–0
Time of possession	32:32	27:28

Team	Category	Player	Statistics
Eastern Michigan	Passing	Brogan McCaughey	27/39, 197 yards, TD, INT
Eastern Michigan	Rushing	Amareon Blue	11 carries, 67 yards
Eastern Michigan	Receiving	Joey Mattord	7 receptions, 55 yards, TD
Ohio	Passing	Nick Poulos	19/29, 266 yards, TD
Ohio	Rushing	Victor Rosa	4 carries, 40 yards
Ohio	Receiving	Dom Dorwart	4 receptions, 125 yards, TD

Ohio hosted Eastern Michigan defending the FBS's longest home winning streak after Indiana's 19 game home winning streak was snapped against Ohio State the prior week. Ohio entered this week tied for first with Western Michigan as the only unbeaten teams in the MAC at 3–0. The Eagles entered this game only ½ game behind at 3–1. They were coming off their first conference loss the prior week against Toledo. Ohio led the all-time series 22–12 while having won the last four matchups.

Brogan McCaughey got the start at quarterback for Eastern michigan in lieu of an injured Noah Kim. On the opening possessions both teams were forced into a quick three-and-outs. Starting deep in their own end, the Eagles converted a pair of third downs but were forced to punt when the drive stalled after linebacker Jack Fries brought McCaughey down for a sack. On the second play of Ohio's second possession, Nick Poulos found Dom Doward for a reception along the sideline and he sprinted the remaining distance to out run the defense for a 78-yard touchdown. EMU was forced into another punt but Ohio followed with a quick punt of their own. On the third play of the ensuing drive, McCaughey's pass was broken up by cornerback Kendall Bannister and intercepted on the deflection by Darren James-Hamilton. The Eagle defense force Ohio into a quick third down where Poulos was sacked by Ronn Hardin and stripped by Aaron Kearse who returned it 25-yards for the tying score early in the second quarter. After, four consecutive pass completions, Ohio marched into EMU territory with a 2nd and 2 on the Eagle 31. After two runs were stuffed they tried to convent on 4th down but Duncan Brune was stopped for no gain. Eastern Michigan was then forced into a three-and-out. James-Hamilton returned the punt. He fumbled and the ball was recovered by Quincy Byas to set up EMU on the Ohio 32. After one first down they reached the 7-yard line where Fries got another key sack. The Eagles took their first lead with a short field goal. Ohio responded with an 8-play, 42-yard march that stalled on the EMU 33. Will Hryszko converted 49-yard field goal, evening the score at 10–10 with 01:39 left in the half. After six plays of a two minute drill, EMU reached the Ohio 31 with 18 seconds remaining. A third down reception failed to get a first down and the Eagle field goal unit successfully sprinted on the field to allow Rudy Kessinger to kick a 41-field goal to give them a 13–10 lead just before the half expired.

The Bobcat offense quickly moved into Eastern Michigan territory at the 31-yard line top open the second half. However, the drive stalled out as Poulos threw three consecutive incomplete passes. Ohio faked a field goal on third and ten as the holder tossed the ball to Hryszko where was stopped by Elgin McDuffey seven yards short of a first down. Ohio's defense stopped the EMU offense short of midfield. Punter Daniel Hull pinned the Bobcats with a punt out of bounds at the 3-yard line. Poulos gave the Bobcats breathing room with a 17-yard strike to tight end Jake Furtney but Ohio was quickly forced to punt. EMU lost yardage on their next possession and quickly punted. The Bobcats put together their most effective drive to take the lead. On the fifth play, Poulos hit AJ Miller for an apparent touchdown that was reversed on review. Poulos took it in himself from the 1 on a speed option on the next play to give the Bobcats the lead near the end of the quarter. Eastern Michigan was forced into another three-and-out but Hull again trapped the Bobcats at their own 8. Ohio's offense stalled just after mid-field and this time it was Magnus Haines' punt that pinned the Eagles at their own 2 with just over 8 minutes remaining. Undaunted, down by three, McCaughey led them on an 8-play 98-yard drive culminating in a 24-yard strike to Joey Mattord to take the lead with 3:53 remaining. On the ensuing kickoff, James-Hamilton received a low line drive kick at the goal line and sprinted untouched for a kickoff return touchdown to give the Bobcats a 24-20 lead. The Eagles took over in need of a touchdown to win the game. After two quick first downs, they converted a 4th and 5 at the Ohio 32 on the third series. Then facing a 4th a 3 at the 19 on the fourth series Ohio was called for pass interference in the end zone. Now with 1st and goal at the 4, McCaughey's next two passes into the endzone fell incomplete. On third down he threw the ball away to avoid a sack by Michael Molnar but was called for intentional grounding. Now facing 4th and goal from the Ohio 16 on the 13th play of the drive with just five seconds remaining, McCaughey's last gasp attempt fell to the ground near the back corner of the endzone to end the game. The win kept Ohio's FBS leading home winning streak alive at 17 straight. The win gave Ohio sole possession of first place as Toledo defeated Western Michigan earlier in the day.

Ohio outgained EMU 356 to 307. Poulos threw for 266 yards and a touchdown and with a rushing touchdown. Victor Rosa led an unproductive rushing day for the Bobcats with 40 yards as they were held to just 90 yards as a team. Dorwart led Bobcat receivers with 125 yards and a touchdown. McCaughey finished with 197 yards passing with a touchdown and interception. Amareon Blue contributed 67 yards rushing while Mattord had 7 catches for 55 yards for the Eagles. Molnar won MAC Defensive Player of the Week and led all tacklers with 18 along with a sack. Fries also had a great day on defense with 10 tackles and 2 sacks. James-Hamilton's game winning return won him MAC Special Teams player of the week.

=== at Akron ===
Ohio Bobcats (6–2) at Akron Zips (1–7) – Game summary

Quarter	1	2	3	4	Total
Bobcats	7	0	7	14	28
Zips	3	3	3	11	20

at InfoCision Stadium–Summa Field • Akron, Ohio

- Date: November 3
- Game time: 7:00 p.m. EST
- Game weather: clear, Temperature:63 °F (17 °C), Wind: S 6 mph (9.7 km/h)
- Game attendance: 5,479
- Referee: Billy Williams (MAC)
- TV announcers (ESPN2): Eric Rothman (play-by-play) and Dustin Fox (analyst)
- Ohio notes • boxscore

Game information

First quarter

- (03:35) AKR – Aidan Stire 42-yard field goal (Drive: 10 plays, 48 yards, 4:44, Akron 3–0)
- (00:09) OHIO – DJ Walker 45-yard interception return (Brack Peacock kick) (Ohio 7–3)

Second quarter

- (03:28) AKR – Aidan Stire 47-yard field goal (Drive: 10 plays, 57 yards, 5:08, Ohio 7–6)

Third quarter

- (09:32) AKR – Aidan Stire 24-yard field goal (Drive: 8 plays, 26 yards, 3:46, Akron 9–7)
- (04:22) OHIO – Nick Poulos 5-yard run (Brack Peacock kick) (Drive: 9 plays, 75 yards, 5:10, Ohio 14–9)

Fourth quarter

- (09:35) AKR – Jordan Gant 1-yard run (Marcel Williams pass from Cibastian Broughton) (Drive: 12 plays, 77 yards, 6:06, Akron 17–14)
- (09:22) OHIO – Dom Dorwart 60-yard pass from Nick Poulos (Brack Peacock kick) (Drive: 1 plays, 60 yards, 0:13, Ohio 21–17)
- (03:57) OHIO – Duncan Brune 91-yard run (Brack Peacock kick) (Drive: 1 plays, 91 yards, 0:14, Ohio 28–17)
- (01:56) AKR – Aidan Stire 43-yard field goal (Drive: 9 plays, 38 yards, 1:51, Ohio 28–20)

Statistics	OHIO	AKR
First downs	12	26
Total yards	46–358	79–392
Rushing yards	26–161	44–160
Passing yards	197	232
Passing: Comp–Att–Int	12–20–0	22–35–1
Time of possession	24:14	35:46

Team	Category	Player	Statistics
Ohio	Passing	Nick Poulos	12/20, 197 yards, TD
Ohio	Rushing	Duncan Brune	10 carries, 111 yards, TD
Ohio	Receiving	Dom Dorwart	4 receptions, 108 yards, TD
Akron	Passing	Cibastian Broughton	22/34, 232 yards, INT
Akron	Rushing	Jordan Gant	16 carries, 112 yards, TD
Akron	Receiving	Kyan Mason	6 receptions, 71 yards

Ohio travelled to Akron for the first mid-week MACtion game. Akron entered the game 1–7 and winless in conference with their only win coming over FCS Robert Morris. Ohio led the all-time series against the Zips 27–13–1 and had won the last seven.

Akron moved the ball well to open the game but their first drive stalled in the red zone. The failed to score when Aidan Stire missed a 40-yard field goal attempt. Ohio’s opening drive quickly stalled. After a Michael Molnar sack on quarterback Cibastian Broughton left Akron with a 3rd and 28 at their own 21, a 31-yard rush, breaking many tackles, by Jordan Gant kept the drive moving. They took the lead on a Stire field goal. Akron took over again after an Ohio three-and-out. Broughton was intercepted by DJ Walker, who returned it for a 45-yard pick-six to give Ohio the lead late in the first quarter. The Zips continued to move the ball. A completion to Kyan Mason moved the ball to the Bobcat 19 where Darren James-Hamilton forced Mason to fumble and Akron was kept off the board again when Jack Fries recovered. Ohio was forced to punt again. After a 10-play drive the Zips got within a point in another Stire field goal. Ohio responded with its best sustained drive, keeping the ball for 11-plays, but Brack Peacock, kicking for an injured Will Hryszko, missed a 41-yard attempt. In spite of the miss, and being outgained by 129 yards in the first half, the Bobcats took a 7–3 lead into the locker room.

On the first drive of the second half, a strip sack of Nick Poulos was recovered by Donelius Johnson setting Ohio up at the Bobcat 32. Akron failed to get in the end zone again and took the lead with another field goal. Ohio responded with 9-play, 75-yard drive with the key play being Poulos finding Dom Dorwart for a 36-yard completion to put the Bobcats inside the five-yard line. Poulos finished the job himself on second-and-goal, scrambling off the left side for a 5-yard touchdown run. Akron was forced to punt, but Ohio was then held to a three-and-out. Akron sustained a 12-play drive mostly on the ground. Akron finally found paydirt when Gant plunged into the end zone on a 1-yard touchdown run with 9:35 remaining in the game. Akron then successfully converted a two-point conversion when Broughton connected with Marcel Williams giving the Zips 17–14 lead. Akron’s lead evaporated almost instantly. On Ohio's very first play of the ensuing possession uncorked a deep 60-yard touchdown pass Dorwart. Akron threatened to retake the lead but stalled deep in Ohio territory again. Down by 4 with 4:11 remaining they chose to go for it on 4th and 6 from the Ohio 9 but a pass into the endzone fell incomplete. Lightning struck again for the Bobcats with another single-play drive when Duncan Brune broke free on a 91-yard touchdown run. Akron again stalled in Ohio territory on the ensuing drive, and now down by 11 with 1:56 left chose a 43-yard field goal on 4th and 10. The onside kick attempt failed and Ohio successfully ran out the clock.

Akron reached Ohio territory eight times but found the endzone only once and turned it over twice to Ohio's once. Ohio scored four touchdowns that were mostly triggered by huge plays. Akron ran 79 plays to Ohio's 46, outgained Ohio 392 to 358, while holding the ball for 35:46. Broughton threw for 232 yards but a key interception kept Ohio in the game early when their offense wasn't moving the ball. Poulos threw for 197 and a touchdown while also scoring once on the ground. Gant led all rushers with 112 yards. Brune almost matched him with 111 with most of it coming on one play. Dorwart led all receivers with 108 yards with most of it on two catches. Molnar and Fries again had huge tackling numbers for the Bobcats with 16 and 10 respectively. Molnar earned MAC Defensive Player of the Week for the third time in five weeks.

=== at Miami (OH) (Battle of the Bricks) ===
Ohio Bobcats (7–2) at Miami RedHawks (5–4) – Game summary

Quarter	1	2	3	4	Total
Bobcats	7	10	0	0	17
RedHawks	0	7	7	20	34

at Yager Stadium • Oxford, Ohio

- Date: November 10
- Game time: 8:00 p.m. EST
- Game weather: clear, Temperature:54 °F (12 °C), Wind: E 5 mph (8.0 km/h)
- Game attendance: 17,156
- Referee: Rick Warne (MAC)
- TV announcers (ESPN2): Clay Matvick (play-by-play) and Rocky Boiman (analyst)
- Ohio notes • boxscore

Game information

First quarter

- (10:05) OHIO – Riley Neer 8-yard pass from Nick Poulos (Brack Peacock kick) (Drive: 8 plays, 75 yards, 4:55, Ohio 7–0)

Second quarter

- (11:01) OHIO – Duncan Brune 8-yard run (Brack Peacock kick) (Drive: 10 plays, 49 yards, 3:48, Ohio 14–0)
- (07:20) OHIO – Brack Peacock 22-yard field goal (Drive: 11 plays, 70 yards, 5:00, Ohio 17–0)
- (01:02) M-OH – Maleek Huggins 15-yard pass from Scoop Smith (Brady Stidham kick) (Drive: 6 plays, 55 yards, 2:29, Ohio 17–7)

Third quarter

- (06:58) M-OH – D'Shawntae Jones 1-yard run (Brady Stidham kick) (Drive: 8 plays, 69 yards, 3:49, Ohio 17–14)

Fourth quarter

- (14:16) M-OH – Brady Stidham 36-yard field goal (Drive: 7 plays, 42 yards, 2:51, Tied 17–17)
- (03:55) M-OH – Brady Stidham 25-yard field goal (Drive: 9 plays, 57 yards, 3:47, Miami 20–17)
- (01:45) M-OH – D'Shawntae Jones 48-yard run (Brady Stidham kick) (Drive: 1 plays, 48 yards, 0:10, Miami 27–17)
- (01:25) M-OH – Amariyunr Knighten 58-yard interception return (Brady Stidham kick) (Miami 34–17)

Statistics	OHIO	M-OH
First downs	21	15
Total yards	80–381	58–361
Rushing yards	37–152	33–208
Passing yards	229	153
Passing: Comp–Att–Int	23–43–1	10–25–0
Time of possession	35:31	24:29

Team	Category	Player	Statistics
Ohio	Passing	Nick Poulos	20/39, 193 yards, TD, INT
Ohio	Rushing	Nick Poulos	17 carries, 68 yards
Ohio	Receiving	Riley Neer	6 receptions, 74 yards, TD
Miami (OH)	Passing	Drew Bellisari	8/15, 99 yards
Miami (OH)	Rushing	D'Shawntae Jones	18 carries, 115 yards, 2 TD
Miami (OH)	Receiving	Maleek Huggins	3 receptions, 61 yards, TD

Miami hosted Ohio on their Senior night. The RedHawks entered this game coming off of their second MAC loss at the hands of Buffalo in overtime and with their conference championship hopes alive but precariously thin. Miami led the Battle of the Bricks rivalry 56–44–2. Ohio had won the last two including a win in the MAC Championship game in 2024 as well as 15 of the last 20.

The Bobcats jumped out to an early lead on the games opening possession by mostly keeping the ball on the ground until Nick Poulos hit Riley Neer for the games first score. The teams exchanged five straight three-and-out possessions. On the sixth possession after the touchdown Ohio was stopped after only one first down. Barry Dillon recovered a fumble by Miami punt returner Lynel Billups-Williams to set up the Bobcats at the Miami 49. After the drive was sustained by a Poulos rush on 4th and 1, Ohio punched in a one-yard touchdown run by Brune four plays into the second quarter to extend its lead to 14–0. After another Miami three-and-out, Ohio sustained a long drive and stalled at the Miami 5. Backup kicker Brack Peacock converted a 22-yard field goal. On the ensuing drive, Caleb Heavner was injured on a sack by Michael Molnar and Miami was forced to punt. After an Ohio three-and-out true freshman Drew Bellisari entered the game and led the drive for the first RedHawk that culminated on a trick play. Wide receiver Scoop Smith threw a 15-yard touchdown pass to Maleek Huggins in the right side of the end zone with 1:02 remaining. On the ensuing possession, Peacock attempted a 34-yard field goal that missed off the upright. Miami was called for unsportsmanlike conduct for putting "depictions of the field goal uprights on the scoreboard". With a second chance, Ohio faked a field goal, holder and punter by position Magnus Haines had Evan Hermann, normally a defensive end, wide open but Blayne Myrick recovered to knock an apparent touchdown loose at the last second as the half ended.

After exchanging punts to open the second half, Miami got within three when D'Shawntae Jones scored form the 1-yard line. After two more three-and-outs and then another short Ohio possession, Brady Stidham tied the game with a 36-yard field goal early in the fourth quarter. The next three possessions resulted in quick punts. Miami took over on their own 36 with 7:37 remaining and took their first lead on another Stidham field goal with 3:55 remaining. Poulos dove for a first down near mid-field on a fourth down scramble but fumbled it back to the RedHawks. Jones wasted no time putting the game away for Miami when he sprinted 48 yards for a touchdown on the drives first play. The game suddenly became lopsided on Miami's favor when Amariyun Knighten intercepted Poulos on the first play of Ohio's drive and returned it 58 yards down the field for a touchdown to push the lead to 34–17 with 1:25 left. Freshman Levi Davis entered in relief of Poulos but the clock ran out on the Bobcats.

Ohio outgained Miami 381 to 361 but it was big plays and late turnovers that made the difference. Poulos led all passers with 198 yards and a touchdown and contributed 68 on the ground. Bellisari, in his debut, led the comeback with 99 passing yards and 64 rushing. D'Shawntae Jones led all rushers with 115 yards and two touchdowns. Riley Neer led all receivers will 74 yards and a touchdown. Miami dominated possession by holding the ball for 35:31.

Ohio lost control of its own destiny in the MAC Championship race as they would need a loss by either Buffalo or Western Michigan in the final two weeks.

=== vs Ball State ===
Ball State Cardinals (3–7) at Ohio Bobcats (7–3) – Game summary

Quarter	1	2	3	4	Total
Cardinals	3	17	0	8	28
Bobcats	7	7	0	21	35

at Peden Stadium • Athens, Ohio

- Date: November 17
- Game time: 7:00 p.m EST
- Game weather: sunny, Temperature:40 °F (4 °C), Wind:CALM 0 mph (0 km/h)
- Game attendance: 12,237
- Referee: Marcel Kerr (MAC)
- TV announcers (CBSSN): John Sadak (play-by-play) and Taylor McHargue (analyst)
- Ohio notes • boxscore

Game information

First quarter

- (10:44) OHIO – Duncan Brune 1-yard run (Brack Peacock kick) (Drive: 7 plays, 83 yards, 4:11, Ohio 7–0)
- (06:17) BALL – Fiene Hudson 24-yard field goal (Drive: 9 plays, 68 yards, 4:27, Ohio 7–3)

Second quarter

- (07:14) BALL – Donovan Hamilton 10-yard pass from Keldric Luster (Fiene Hudson kick) (Drive: 12 plays, 73 yards, 6:20, Ball State 10–7)
- (04:09) BALL – Eli Hohlt 80-yard pass from Keldric Luster (Fiene Hudson kick) (Drive: 2 plays, 80 yards, 0:19, Ball State 17–7)
- (01:09) OHIO – Nick Poulos 8-yard run (Brack Peacock kick) (Drive: 6 plays, 75 yards, 3:00, Ball State 17–14)
- (00:00) BALL – Fiene Hudson 43-yard field goal (Drive: 11 plays, 59 yards, 1:03, Ball State 20–14)

Third quarter

- No scoring plays.

Fourth quarter

- (14:19) OHIO – Darren James-Hamilton 34-yard interception return (Brack Peacock kick) (Ohio 21–20)
- (07:15) OHIO – Nick Poulos 12-yard run (Brack Peacock kick) (Drive: 8 plays, 52 yards, 4:47, Ohio 28–20)
- (02:23) BALL – TJ Horton 2-yard run (Fiene Hudson kick) (Drive: 10 plays, 68 yards, 4:45, Tied 28–28)
- (01:16) OHIO – Dom Dorwart 29-yard pass from Nick Poulos (Brack Peacock kick) (Drive: 6 plays, 66 yards, 01:01; Ohio 35–28)

Statistics	BALL	OHIO
First downs	22	24
Total yards	69–448	56–365
Rushing yards	34–191	39–186
Passing yards	257	179
Passing: Comp–Att–Int	20–35–1	12–17–1
Time of possession	28:38	31:22

Team	Category	Player	Statistics
Ball State	Passing	Keldric Luster	20/33, 257 yards, 2 TD, INT
Ball State	Rushing	Keldric Luster	16 carries, 109 yards
Ball State	Receiving	Eli Hohlt	4 receptions, 112 yards, TD
Ohio	Passing	Nick Poulos	9/13, 155 yards, TD, INT
Ohio	Rushing	Victor Rosa	12 carries, 65 yards
Ohio	Receiving	Riley Neer	5 receptions, 92 yards

The Bobcats put the nation's longest home winning streak on the line against Ball State. The Cardinals entered the game at 3–7 and out of the conference race at 2–4. Ball State upset Ohio the prior season. That loss cost the Bobcats a chance in the MAC Championship.

On the first play from scrimmage, Ohio quarterback Nick Poulos launched a deep bomb wide receiver Riley Neer for a 46-yard gain to the Ball State 37 setting up a Duncan Brune plunge for a touchdown 6 plays later. Ball State settled for a short field goal on their first possession and then forced Ohio to punt. The teams traded punts again before Ball State took the lead when Keldric Luster connected with Donovan Hamilton over the middle for a 10-yard touchdown. the Bobcats moved the ball Ball State 39-yard line on the ensuing drive before Poulos threw an interception to Ball State defensive back Quentavius Scandrett in the end zone for a touchback. The Cardinals wasted no time letting the home crowd know they were there to pull off the upset. Luster connected with wide receiver Eli Hohlt on a short pass and a busted coverage allowed him to run for an 80-yard touchdown on the drive's second play with 4:09 remaining in the half. Ohio responded with a 6 plays, 75 yard drive to get back within three culminating in Poulos scoring on an 8-yard rushing touchdown with 1:09 left. Ball State capitalized on the little time remaining and moved to the Ohio 26-yard line where Hudson Fiene drilled a 43-yard field goal as time expired to send Ball State into the locker room ahead 20–14.

BSU moved into Bobcat territory but DJ Walker forced a fumble at the 35-yard line and recovered it himself to end the drive. Ohio was forced into a three-and-out as their offense continued to struggle but Ball State was also quickly forced to punt. Ohio brought in Levi Davis for a change of pace at quarterback. Davis scrambled up the middle for 21 yards to cross into Ball State territory at the 45 on a third-and-16 and hit Neer a few plays later to reach the 22. The drive then unraveled after a holding penalty and a sack and Magnus Haines's punt pinned BSU at their own 12. Pressured by Ohio defensive end Ike Ackerman on third down of the first series of the ensuing drive and second play of the fourth quarter, Luster threw a pass that was intercepted by Bobcats defensive back Darren James-Hamilton at the 34-yard line and returned 34 yards into the end zone for a touchdown to give the Bobcat's their first lead since the early stages of the game. After a Cardinal three-and-out, Poulos returned and the Bobcats kept the ball for 8-plays and close to five minutes. Poulos capped off the drive on 12-yard touchdown run to the right to put Ohio up 28–20 with 7:15 remaining. Ball State responded with a 10-play drive. They marched to the Bobcat 16 behind Luster's arm but faced a 4th and 2. A sweep to the right by Donovan Hamilton moved the chains the a pass interference penalty placed the ball at the two. TJ Horton punched it in on a rush to the right, and Luster connected with Hamilton on the two-point conversion pass to tie the game at 28–28 with 2:23 left. On the fifth play of Ohio's two-minute drill, Poulos hit Neer over the middle for 14 yards to the 29-yard line, and on the next snap, Poulos connected with Dom Dorwart down the right sideline for a 29-yard touchdown pass with 1:16 remaining. With five seconds left and on fourth-and-16 from the Ohio 49, Luster heaved a hail mary that was broken up by James-Hamilton as time expired to seal Ohio's 35–28 win.

Luster was the star of the game as Ball State nearly pulled off the upset. His 257 passing yards with two touchdowns and 109 rushing led all players. Eli Hohlt's long touchdown made him the leading receiver with 112 yards. Poulos threw for 155 with a touchdown and scored twice on the ground. Victor Rosa led Ohio with 65 yards rushing. Neer again led Bobcat receivers with 92 yards receiving. Michael Molnar led all defenders with 12 tackles. Ball State led for most of the game and outgained Ohio 448 to 365.

=== vs Toledo ===
Toledo Rockets (–) at Ohio Bobcats (8–3) – Game summary

Quarter	1	2	Total
Rockets			0
Bobcats			0

at Peden Stadium • Athens, Ohio

- Date: November 27
- Game time: 12:00 p.m. EST
- TV: TBA

Game information

First quarter
Second quarter
Third quarter
Fourth quarter

Statistics	TOL	OHIO
First downs		
Total yards	–	–
Rushing yards	–	–
Passing yards		
Passing: Comp–Att–Int	––	––
Turnovers		
Time of possession		

Team	Category	Player	Statistics
Toledo	Passing		
Toledo	Rushing		
Toledo	Receiving		
Ohio	Passing		
Ohio	Rushing		
Ohio	Receiving		

== Personnel ==
=== Coaching staff ===
Since December 26, 2025, the head coach of the Ohio Bobcats has been John Hauser. He heads a staff of fourteen assistant coaches, four graduate assistants, a director of football operations, and numerous other support staff.

Name	Position	Years at Ohio	Alma mater
John Hauser	Head coach	2022	Wittenberg University 2002
Lamar Conard	Assistant Head Coach/Running backs	2026	Purdue University 2000
Scott Isphording	Offensive Coordinator/Quarterbacks	2014	Hanover College 1994
Kurt Mattix	Defensive Coordinator	2026	Valparaiso University 1999
Blair Cavanaugh	Special Teams Coordinator	2025	Portland State University 2016
DeAngelo Smith	Defensive Passing Game Coordinator/Cornerbacks/Director of Player Development	2017	University of Cincinnati 2008
Tremayne Scott	Running Game Coordinator/Defensive Tackles	2018	Ohio University 2012
Kyle Obly	Passing Game Coordinator/Tight Ends	2025	Ohio University 2022
Jeff Phelps	Pass Rush Specialist/Defensive Ends	2025	Ball State University 1999
Danny Langsdorf	Wide Receivers	2026	Linfield University 1995
Chris Woods	Linebackers	2025	Davidson College 1990
Ron Crook	Offensive Line	2026	West Liberty State University 1991
Joe Tresey	Defensive Assistant Coach / Director of Staff	2024	Ohio State University 1982
Brandon Pahl	Graduate assistant – Offensive Line		
Keye Thompson	Graduate assistant – Linebackers		
Ethan Gaspar	Graduate assistant – Quarterbacks		
Eddie Faulkner	Graduate assistant – Secondary		

=== Support staff ===
Name	Position	Years at Ohio	Alma mater
Emily Tabeek	Director of athletics administration and football communications	2022	Southern Illinois University
Jacob Fouch	Assistant Director of Equipment	2025	Ball State University
Miya Garrete	Associate AD of Brand Advancement and Communications Strategy (Football)	2026	Arkansas State University
Erin Hanning	Administrative Services Associate (Football)	2026	
Shaun Cook	General Manager	2026	University of Tennessee
Jeremiah Covington	Assistant athletic director for football operations	2022	Wingate University 2011
Thomas Turnbaugh	Director of video and recruiting services	2018	Ohio University
Addie Parde	On-Campus Recruiting Coordinator	2026	University of Nebraska–Lincoln
Dave Polanski	Head Football Athletic Trainer	2026	Purdue University
Jerry Lin	Staff Athletic trainer (football, swim & dive)	2022	University of South Carolina
Joseph Benish	Staff Athletic Trainer (Football/Track)	2023	Penn State University
Dr. Danielle Thornsberry	Team Physician	2024	Case Western Reserve University
Dr. Sergio Ulloa	Team Orthopedic Physician		Ohio University
James Odenthal	Staff Physical Therapist	2016	Ohio University
Nina Thompson	Staff Physical Therapist	2026	University of North Carolina
Dr. Michelle Pride	Psychologist/Athletics Embedded Clinician	2006	Bowling Green State University
Tyler Shumate	Director of Strength and Conditioning	2024	University of Virginia
Noah Spielman	Associate Director of Football Strength and Conditioning	2025	Wheaton College
Alvin Floyd	Assistant Strength and Conditioning Coach	2023	Ohio University 2020
Theodus Ringgold	Football Strength and Conditioning – Graduate Assistant	2025	
Jessica Arquette	Ohio athletics sports dietitian	2022	Bowling Green State University
Micayla McClure	Sports Nutrition Graduate Assistant		

=== Roster ===
2026 Ohio Bobcats football roster

Quarterback

- 5 Hype Grand – R-Fr. 6' 0″ (185 lb.) La Puente, Calif. / Pasadena
- 7 Levi Davis – Fr. 6' 0″ (192 lb.) Lewis Center, Ohio / Olentangy Orange
- 8 Nick Poulos – Gr. 6' 6″ (243 lb.) Granite Bay, Calif. / Granite Bay / El Camino College
- 9 Matt Vezza – Jr. 6' 0″ (198 lb.) Elmhurst, Ill. / York / UNH
- 16 Matthew Papas – R-So. 5' 11″ (192 lb.) Grove City, Ohio / Grove City

Running Back

- 4 Victor Rosa – Gr. 5' 11″ (208 lb.) Bristol, Conn. / Bristol Central / UConn
- 6 Duncan Brune – Jr. 5' 11″ (218 lb.) Cologne, Germany / Cologne
- 22 Mike Taylor Jr. – R-Fr. 5' 10″ (204 lb.) Columbus, Ohio / Pickerington North
- 23 James Kelly – Fr. 6' 0″ (205 lb.) Trussville, Ala. / Hewitt-Trussville
- 24 Irving Brown – R-Fr. 5' 11″ (220 lb.) Teachey, N.C. / Wallace-Rose Hill

Wide Receiver

- 0 Delaney Crawford – R-Sr. 6' 2″ (202 lb.) Fontana, Calif. / Corona Senior / Virginia
- 2 Preston Bowman – R-Fr. 5' 11″ (207 lb.) Pickerington, Ohio / Pickerington North / Kentucky
- 3 Dom Dorwart – R-So. 6' 2″ (208 lb.) Leonardtown, Md. / St. Mary's Ryken
- 3 Max Rodarte – Gr. 6' 0″ (192 lb.) Sacramento, Calif. / Capital Christian / City College of San Francisco
- 10 Ian Ver Steeg – Gr. 5' 10″ (184 lb.) Severn, Md. / Archbishop Spalding / Wake Forest
- 11 Zach Hackleman – Fr. 6' 2″ (185 lb.) Cleveland, Ohio / St. Edward
- 12 Eian Pugh – R-Sr. 6' 3″ (182 lb.) Oak Park, Ill. / Fenwick / Illinois
- 13 Rashad Perry – R-Fr. 5' 11″ (160 lb.) Fresno, Calif. / Washington Union
- 14 Marcus Hughbanks – Fr. 6' 2″ (204 lb.) Batavia, Ohio / Batavia
- 15 Riley Neer – R-So. 5' 11″ (190 lb.) Bellefontaine, Ohio / Bellefontaine
- 17 Blake Parker – Fr. 6' 2″ (180 lb.) Sandusky, Ohio / Perkins
- 18 Miles Cremascoli – R-So. 6' 3″ (213 lb.) Winnetka, Ill. / New Trier
- 31 Khamani Debrow – R-Jr. 6' 3″ (206 lb.) Killeen, Texas / Ellison
- 37 Blake Guffey – R-Sr. 6' 1″ (221 lb.) Glouster, Ohio / Trimble / Notre Dame College (Ohio)
- 80 Kaden Page – Fr. 6' 3″ (195 lb.) Wapakoneta, Ohio / Wapakoneta
- 81 MC Walker II – Fr. 5' 11″ (180 lb.) Columbus, Ohio / Olentangy Orange

Tight End

- 33 Jake Furtney – R-So. 6' 4″ (242 lb.) St. Charles, Ill. / St. Charles North / Illinois
- 44 Aiden Lowery – R-So. 6' 3″ (238 lb.) Dublin, Ohio / Dublin Jerome
- 84 AJ Miller – R-So. 6' 4″ (239 lb.) Pickerington, Ohio / Pickerington North
- 85 Riley Palmeter – R-Sr. 6' 4″ (230 lb.) Edinburgh, Ind. / Edinburgh / Marian
- 86 Andrew Metzger – R-So. 6' 4″ (246 lb.) Aurora, Colo. / Regis Jesuit / Kansas State
- 87 Tim Boals – R-Fr. 6' 4″ (235 lb.) Sandusky, Ohio / Perkins
- 88 Calvin Moody – Fr. 6' 5″ (230 lb.) Noblesville, Ind. / Noblesville

Offensive lineman

- 51 Job Mavrick – Fr. 6' 2″ (291 lb.) Westfield, Ind. / Westfield
- 53 Lance Blakely Jr. – Fr. 6' 4″ (270 lb.) Columbus, Ohio / Pickerington North
- 54 Will Odenthal – Fr. 6' 5″ (300 lb.) Nelsonville, Ohio / Nelsonville-York
- 55 CJ Dawson II – Sr. 6' 2″ (327 lb.) Green, Ohio / Green / Gardner-Webb
- 56 Ben Maldonado – Gr. 6' 4″ (291 lb.) Miami, Fla. / Champagnat Catholic School
- 60 Colton Crosley – Fr. 6' 3″ (290 lb.) Mayfield, Ohio / Walsh Jesuit
- 63 Seth Anstead – R-So. 6' 4″ (300 lb.) Chelsea, Mich. / Chelsea
- 65 Josh Waite – Gr. 6' 3″ (301 lb.) Roaring Springs, Pa. / Central Martinsburg / Shippensburg
- 66 Mike Montgomery – Fr. 6' 5″ (250 lb.) West Branch, Iowa / West Branch
- 70 Joshua Johnson – Gr. 6' 2″ (311 lb.) Westerville, Ohio / Westerville Central / EIU
- 71 Cassius Hulbert – Gr. 6' 3″ (310 lb.) Edon, Ohio / Edon / Tiffin
- 72 Sandro Malicevic – Sr. 6' 5″ (332 lb.) Saratoga, Calif. / Prospect / Eastern Illinois / San Jose City College
- 74 Tigana Cisse – Gr. 6' 3″ (305 lb.) Oakland, Calif. / McClymonds / Idaho
- 75 Jarian Shelby – R-Sr. 6' 3″ (290 lb.) Luling, La. / Hahnville
- 76 Bryce Parson – R-So. 6' 2″ (296 lb.) St. Louis, Mo. / Christian Brothers College
- 77 Trumain Lawson – R-Fr. 6' 5″ (278 lb.) Clifton, N.J. / Clifton / LIU
- 78 Danny Fortson – Fr. 6' 5″ (265 lb.) Cincinnati, Ohio / Princeton

Placekicker

- 43 Brack Peacock – R-Jr. 5' 7″ (165 lb.) Granbury, Texas / Granbury / Incarnate Word
- 47 Will Hryszko – Gr. 5' 10″ (187 lb.) Strongsville, Ohio / Strongsville / Kent State
- 93 Owen Schaadt – Fr. 6' 0″ (190 lb.) West Chester, Pa. / Bayard Rustin

Defensive line

- 0 Nehemiah Dukes – Sr. 6' 1″ (288 lb.) Douglasville, Ga. / Alexander / Youngstown State
- 9 Tyler Gillison – Gr. 6' 2″ (252 lb.) Pickerington, Ohio / Pickerington Central / Michigan State / Cincinnati
- 10 Drayden Pavey – Fr. 6' 1″ (276 lb.) Cincinnati, Ohio / Taft HS
- 11 Evan Herrmann – R-Jr. 6' 5″ (245 lb.) Sussex, Wis. / Hamilton / Vanderbilt
- 14 Ike Ackerman – R-Fr. 6' 4″ (249 lb.) Omaha, Neb. / Omaha Central
- 23 Joseph Marsh – R-Jr. 6' 3″ (232 lb.) Simi Valley, Calif. / Oaks Christian / Boise State/College of the Canyons
- 34 Troy Stiggers – Fr. 6' 3″ (240 lb.) Lithonia, Ga. / Stephenson
- 44 Austin Adkins – Fr. 6' 3″ (270 lb.) Strongsville, Ohio / Strongsville
- 50 Owen DiFranco – R-Jr. 6' 4″ (258 lb.) Glen Ellyn, Ill. / Glenbard South
- 51 Isaiah Street – R-Sr. 6' 3″ (236 lb.) Brownsburg, Ind. / Brownsburg / Marian University / Western Michigan
- 57 Nathan Hale – Gr. 6' 4″ (259 lb.) Wichita, Kan. / Northwest / Iowa Western CC
- 91 Nate Hunt-Heller – Fr. 6' 2″ (254 lb.) Tallmadge, Ohio / Tallmadge
- 92 RJ Keuchler – R-Jr. 6' 3″ (255 lb.) Pickerington, Ohio / Pickerington Central
- 94 Brandon Weaver – R-Fr. 6' 3″ (269 lb.) Hilliard, Ohio / Hilliard Darby
- 96 Tyler Stearman – Fr. 6' 4″ (210 lb.) Loveland, Ohio / Cincinnati Hills Christian Academy
- 97 Austin Mitchell – R-Jr. 6' 2″ (274 lb.) Avon, Ohio / Avon
- 98 Derek Reagans – Sr. 6' 0″ (279 lb.) San Francisco, Calif. / Sacred Heart Cathedral / City College of San Francisco
- 99 Ty Neubert – R-Fr. 6' 3″ (278 lb.) Columbus, Ohio / St. Francis De Sales

Linebacker

- 12 Jermaine Minnis – R-Fr. 6' 2″ (204 lb.) Hyattsville, Md. / DeMatha Catholic
- 15 William Marzolf – So. 6' 1″ (220 lb.) Orlando, Fla. / Edgewater / Mars Hill
- 25 Michael Molnar – R-Sr. 6' 3″ (227 lb.) Mason, Ohio / Mason
- 27 Jack Fries – R-Sr. 6' 2″ (222 lb.) Cincinnati, Ohio / LaSalle
- 30 Charlie Christopher – So. 6' 0″ (227 lb.) Uniontown, Ohio / Lake
- 32 Alex Brown – Fr. 6' 2″ (220 lb.) Mason, Ohio / Mason
- 35 Mac Capen – Fr. 6' 3″ (207 lb.) Newfane, N.Y. / Newfane Senior
- 41 Colin Wooldridge – Fr. 6' 0″ (200 lb.) Cincinnati, Ohio / La Salle
- 45 Brady Wharton – R-Fr. 5' 10″ (193 lb.) Athens, Ohio / Athens
- 52 Nolan Ogburn – Fr. 6' 2″ (235 lb.) Kettering, Ohio / Archbishop Alter
- 56 Cody Raymond – R-So. 6' 3″ (231 lb.) Shelby, Mich. / Eisenhower / Wisconsin

Defensive back

- 2 DJ Walker – R-Jr. 6' 1″ (198 lb.) Aliquippa, Pa. / Aliquippa
- 3 JT Haskins – Jr. 5' 11″ (182 lb.) Lexington, Ky. / Bryan Station
- 4 Darren James-Hamilton – R-So. 5' 10″ (187 lb.) Charlotte, N.C. / Mallard Creek / Elon
- 5 KJ Sejour – R-Fr. 5' 9″ (160 lb.) Hollywood, Fla. / Chaminade-Madonna / Chattanooga
- 6 Tony Mathis – Jr. 5' 11″ (176 lb.) Macon, Ga. / Westside
- 7 Eli Thompson – Jr. 5' 10″ (183 lb.) Rome, Ga. / Darlington School / Holy Cross
- 8 Barry Dillon – R-So. 6' 1″ (198 lb.) Vicksburg, Miss. / Arlington / Incarnate Word
- 13 DJ Morton – R-So. 6' 1″ (191 lb.) Indianapolis, Ind. / Lawrence Central
- 16 Ryan Miller – Fr. 6' 1″ (230 lb.) Columbus, Ohio / Pickerington North HS
- 17 Caleb Chamberlin – R-So. 6' 1″ (199 lb.) Jupiter, Fla. / Palm Beach Gardens / Air Force
- 18 Andrew Vera – Sr. 5' 11″ (199 lb.) St. Clairsville, Ohio / St. Clairsville
- 19 Bobby Miller – R-Fr. 6' 4″ (177 lb.) Orlando, Fla. / Bishop Moore
- 20 Kendall Bannister – R-Jr. 5' 11″ (187 lb.) Woodbridge, Va. / Freedom
- 21 Ronald Jackson Jr. – Gr. 6' 1″ (203 lb.) Detroit, Mich. / Belleville / Montana/Akron
- 22 Brandon Jenkins – Fr. 5' 10″ (189 lb.) Chicago, Ill. / John Hersey
- 24 Cam Cope – R-Sr. 5' 11″ (188 lb.) Cincinnati, Ohio / La Salle / Dayton
- 26 Tyson Long – R-Fr. 6' 0″ (184 lb.) Pickerington, Ohio / Pickerington North
- 28 Kindall Brown – Fr. 5' 10″ (174 lb.) Cleveland, Ohio / Maple Heights
- 36 Malachi Taylor – Fr. 6' 0″ (190 lb.) Columbus, Ohio / Pickerington North
- 29 Jay Brewer III – Fr. 6' 2″ (190 lb.) Akron, Ohio / Walsh Jesuit
- 49 Xavier Williams – R-So. 5' 10″ (156 lb.) Akron, Ohio / Archbishop Hoban

Punter

- 42 Magnus Haines – Gr. 6' 0″ (193 lb.) Massillon, Ohio / Massillon / Arkansas State/Kent State
- 90 Kolten Bartels – R-Fr. 5‘10“ (195 lb.) Richmond, Mich. / Richmond

Long Snapper

- 46 Nick Hemer – R-Sr. 6' 4″ (205 lb.) Pittsburgh, Pa. / Seneca Valley / Hutchinson CC/Buffalo
- 83 Ethan Najm – Fr. 5' 10″ (195 lb.) Murfreesboro, Tenn. / Blackman

As of August 9, 2026

=== Depth chart ===
Defense

FS
DJ Walker
Caleb Chamberlin
–

NICKEL	WILL	MIKE
Eli Thompson	Jack Fries	Charlie Christopher
Ronald Jackson	Michael Molnar	Michael Molnar
–	Jermaine Minnis	Cody Raymond

SS
JT Haskins
Darren James-Hamilton
Tony Mathis

CB
KJ Sejour
Barry Dillon
-

DE	DT	DT	DE
Ike Ackerman	Ty Neubert	Nehemiah Dukes	Tyler Gillison
Evan Hermann	Nathan Hale	Derek Regan	Joseph Marsh
RJ Keuchler	Owen DiFranco	–	Isaiah Street

CB
Kendall Bannister
Bobby Miller
Tyson Long

Offense

WR
Dom Dorwart
Khamani Debrow
–

WR
Riley Neer
Preston Bowman
–

LT	LG	C	RG	RT
Jarian Shelby	CJ Dawson	Bryce Parson	Seth Anstead	Tiganna Cisse
Trumain Lawson	Sandro Malicevic	Josh Waite	Job Mavrick	Lance Blakely Jr.
–	–	–	–	–

TE
AJ Miller
Jake Furtney
–

WR
Eian Pugh
Miles Cremascoli
–

QB
Nick Poulos
Matt Vezza
Levi Davis

RB
Duncan Brune
Victor Rosa
–

Special teams
PK Will Hryszko
Brack Peacock
P Magnus Haines
Kolten Bartels
KR Victor Rosa
Darren James-Hamilton
PR Darren James-Hamilton
Dom Dorwart
Riley Neer
LS Nick Hemer
Ethan Najm

For November 3, 2026 Game 9 vs. Akron – Source:

=== Coaching staff changes ===
==== Departures ====
Name	Position	New school	New position
Brian Smith	Head coach		
Tavita Thompson	Offensive Line Coach	Cal Poly	Tight Ends Coach
Andre Allen	Wide receivers		

==== Additions ====
Name	Position	Previous school	Previous position
Kurt Mattix	Defensive Coordinator	Charlotte	Co-Defensive Coordinator/Defensive Line Coach
Alvin Floyd	Running Backs Coach	Ohio	Assistant Strength and Conditioning Coach
Ron Crook	Offensive Line Coach	Virginia Tech	Offensive Line Coach
Lamar Conard	Assistant Head Coach / Running Backs Coach	Purdue	Running Backs Coach
Danny Langsdorf	Wide Receivers Coach	Oregon State	Offensive Quality Coach

==== Internal changes ====
Name	New Position	Previous position
John Hauser	Head coach	Associate Head Coach/Defensive Coordinator/Safeties
Kyle Olby	Passing game coordinator/Tight Ends	Tight ends
Joe Tresey	Defensive Assistant Coach / Director of Staff	Director of High School Relations

=== Transfers ===
Positions key
Offense	Defense	Special teams
QB — Quarterback; RB — Running back; FB — Fullback; WR — Wide receiver; TE — Tight end; OL — Offensive lineman; T — Tackle; G — Guard; C — Center	DL — Defensive lineman; DT — Defensive tackle (Note: Includes nose tackle (NT)); DE — Defensive end; EDGE — Edge rusher; LB — Linebacker (Note: Includes middle linebacker (MLB/MIKE), weakside linebacker (WILL), strongside linebacker (SAM), off-ball linebacker, and outside linebacker (OLB)); DB — Defensive back; CB — Cornerback; S — Safety (Note: Includes free safety (FS) and strong safety (SS))	K — Kicker (Note: Also known as a placekicker (PK)); P — Punter; LS — Long snapper; RS — Return specialist (Note: Includes kickoff and punt returners)

==== Outgoing ====
Player	Position	Destination
Davion Weatherspoon	IOL	Arkansas
Alfred Jordan Jr.	WR	St. Thomas University (Florida)
David Dellenbach	K	Weber State
Jalen Thomeson	S	San Diego State
Anas Luqman	Edge	UConn
Jay Crable	Edge	Florida Atlantic
Jordon Jones	OT	Troy
Mason Williams	TE	Ohio State
Nick Segarra	TE	Furman
Rodney Harris II	WR	Oklahoma State
Chase Hendricks	WR	California
Danny Novickas	Edge	Quincy
Ibrahim Kebe	OT	UTSA
Callum Wither	QB	Maryland
Jacob Winters	QB	Rio Grande

==== Incoming ====
Player	Position	Transferred from
Matt Vezza	QB	New Hampshire
Trumain Lawson	OT	LIU
DJ James-Hamilton	S	Elon
Will Hryszko	K	Kent State
Isaiah Street	Edge	Western Michigan
Jake Furtney	TE	Illinois
Cody Raymond	Edge	Wisconsin
Kevin Fay	LS	Gardner-Webb
Preston Bowman	WR	Kentucky
Ian VerSteeg	WR	Wake Forest
Tyler Gillison	Edge	Michigan State
Riley Palmeter	TE	Marian (IN)
Sandro Malicevic	OT	Eastern Illinois
Andrew Metzger	TE	Kansas State
Barry Dillon	CB	Incarnate Word
KJ Sejour	CB	Chattanooga
Victor Rosa	RB	UConn
CJ Dawson	IOL	Gardner-Webb
Eli Thompson	CB	Holy Cross
Cassius Hulbert	DL	Tiffin
William Marzolf	LB	Mars Hill
Lance Blakely	IOL	Wayne State

=== Recruiting class ===
College recruiting
Name	Hometown	School	Height	Weight	Commit date
Brandon Jenkins; ATH	Arlington Heights, IL	John Hersey	6 ft 0 in (1.83 m)	190 lb (86 kg)	
Brandon Jenkins; ATH	Recruit ratings: Rivals: 247Sports: ESPN: (75)				
Kaden Page; WR	Wapakoneta, OH	Wapakoneta	6 ft 2 in (1.88 m)	180 lb (82 kg)	
Kaden Page; WR	Recruit ratings: Rivals: 247Sports: ESPN: (76)				
Malachi Taylor; CB	Pickerington, OH	Pickerington North	5 ft 10 in (1.78 m)	170 lb (77 kg)	
Malachi Taylor; CB	Recruit ratings: Rivals: 247Sports: ESPN: (77)				
Danny Fortson Jr. IOL	Cincinnati, OH	Princeton	6 ft 5 in (1.96 m)	260 lb (120 kg)	
Danny Fortson Jr. IOL	Recruit ratings: Rivals: 247Sports: ESPN:				
Levi Davis; QB	Lewis Center, OH	Olentangy Orange	5 ft 11 in (1.80 m)	175 lb (79 kg)	
Levi Davis; QB	Recruit ratings: Rivals: 247Sports: ESPN: (76)				
Kindall Brown; CB	Cleveland, OH	Maple Heights	5 ft 10 in (1.78 m)	175 lb (79 kg)	
Kindall Brown; CB	Recruit ratings: Rivals: 247Sports: ESPN: (74)				
Colton Crosley; IOL	Cuyahoga Falls, OH	Walsh Jesuit	6 ft 3 in (1.91 m)	275 lb (125 kg)	
Colton Crosley; IOL	Recruit ratings: Rivals: 247Sports: ESPN: (74)				
Austin Adkins; DL	Strongsville, OH	Strongsville	6 ft 3 in (1.91 m)	250 lb (110 kg)	
Austin Adkins; DL	Recruit ratings: Rivals: 247Sports: ESPN: (74)				
Mike Montgomery; OT	West Branch, IA	West Branch	6 ft 5 in (1.96 m)	240 lb (110 kg)	
Mike Montgomery; OT	Recruit ratings: Rivals: 247Sports: ESPN: (74)				
James Brewer; S	Stow, OH	Walsh Jesuit	6 ft 2 in (1.88 m)	170 lb (77 kg)	
James Brewer; S	Recruit ratings: Rivals: 247Sports: ESPN: (75)				
Zach Hackleman; WR	Lakewood, OH	St. Edward	6 ft 0 in (1.83 m)	170 lb (77 kg)	
Zach Hackleman; WR	Recruit ratings: Rivals: 247Sports: ESPN:				
Nate Hunt-Heller; DL	Tallmadge, OH	Tallmadge	6 ft 4 in (1.93 m)	240 lb (110 kg)	
Nate Hunt-Heller; DL	Recruit ratings: Rivals: 247Sports: ESPN: (73)				
Ryan Miller; S	Pickerington, OH	Pickerington North	6 ft 2 in (1.88 m)	190 lb (86 kg)	
Ryan Miller; S	Recruit ratings: Rivals: 247Sports: ESPN: (73)				
James Kelly; WR	Trussville, AL	Hewitt-Trussville	6 ft 0 in (1.83 m)	210 lb (95 kg)	
James Kelly; WR	Recruit ratings: Rivals: 247Sports: ESPN: (72)				
Troy Stiggers; EDGE	Stone Mountain, GA	Stephenson	6 ft 2 in (1.88 m)	230 lb (100 kg)	
Troy Stiggers; EDGE	Recruit ratings: Rivals: 247Sports: ESPN: (73)				
Job Maverick; IOL	Westfield, IN	Westfield	6 ft 2 in (1.88 m)	280 lb (130 kg)	
Job Maverick; IOL	Recruit ratings: Rivals: 247Sports:				
Victor Rosa; RB	Bristol, CT	Bristol Central	5 ft 11 in (1.80 m)	206 lb (93 kg)	
Victor Rosa; RB	Recruit ratings: Rivals:				
Preston Bowman; WR	Pickerington, OH	Pickerington North	6 ft 0 in (1.83 m)	204 lb (93 kg)	
Preston Bowman; WR	Recruit ratings: Rivals: 247Sports:				
Jake Furtney; TE	Saint Charles, IL	St Charles North	6 ft 4 in (1.93 m)	235 lb (107 kg)	
Jake Furtney; TE	Recruit ratings: Rivals: 247Sports:				
Overall recruit ranking:
Note: In many cases, Scout, Rivals, 247Sports, On3, and ESPN may conflict in their listings of height and weight.; In these cases, the average was taken. ESPN grades are on a 100-point scale.; Sources: "Rivals commits". Rivals.; "ESPN commits". ESPN.; "2026 Team Ranking". Rivals.com.; "247Sports commits". 247Sports.

== Awards and honors ==
=== Weekly awards ===
Award	Player	Position	Year	Date	Source
MAC Defensive Player of the Week	Michael Molnar	LB	R-Sr.	Oct. 12	
MAC Defensive Player of the Week	Michael Molnar	LB	R-Sr.	Oct. 26	
MAC Special Teams Player of the Week	Darren James-Hamilton	LB	R-Sr.	Oct. 26	
MAC Defensive Player of the Week	Michael Molnar	LB	R-Sr.	Nov. 9	

=== Mid-season awards ===
Award	Player	Position	Year	Date	Source
Jet Award Mid-season Watch list	Darren James-Hamilton	KR\PR\S	R-S0.	Oct. 14	

=== Award semi-finalists ===
Award	Player	Position	Year	Source
William V. Campbell Trophy	Jack Fries	LB	R-Sr.	
