= 2026 Eastern Michigan Eagles football team =

American college football season

2026 Eastern Michigan Eagles football
- Conference: Mid-American Conference
- Record: 4–7 (3–4 MAC)
- Head coach: Chris Creighton (13th season)
- Offensive coordinator: Mike Piatkowski (4th season)
- Offensive scheme: Spread
- Defensive coordinator: Tate Omli (1st season)
- Co-defensive coordinator: Kasey Teegardin (1st season)
- Base defense: 4–2–5
- Home stadium: Rynearson Stadium

2026 Mid-American Conference football standings
	Conf.			Overall
Team	W		L	W		L
Ohio	6	–	1	8	–	3
Western Michigan	6	–	1	8	–	3
Buffalo	6	–	1	8	–	3
Toledo	5	–	1	8	–	2
Miami (OH)	5	–	2	7	–	4
Bowling Green	3	–	3	3	–	7
Central Michigan	3	–	4	5	–	6
Eastern Michigan	3	–	4	4	–	7
UMass	2	–	5	5	–	6
Kent State	2	–	5	3	–	8
Ball State	2	–	5	3	–	8
Akron	1	–	6	2	–	9
Sacramento State	1	–	7	2	–	9
Championship: December 5, 2026
As of November 19, 2026; Rankings from AP poll

The 2026 Eastern Michigan Eagles football team represents Eastern Michigan University in the Mid-American Conference (MAC) during the 2026 NCAA Division I FBS football season. The Eagles are led by Chris Creighton in his 13th year as the head coach. The team has two defensive coordinators: Tate Omli and Kasey Teegardin.

The team is lead on the field by Noah Kim who previously played quarterback for Michigan State.

The Eagles play their home games at Rynearson Stadium, located in Ypsilanti, Michigan.

== Schedule ==
Date	Time	Opponent	Site	TV	Result	Attendance
August 29	6:30 p.m.	Sacramento State	Rynearson Stadium; Ypsilanti, MI	ESPN+	W 28–17	9,401
September 4	6:30 p.m.	San Jose State*	Rynearson Stadium; Ypsilanti, MI	ESPN+	L 21–27	5,646
September 12	3:30 p.m.	at Michigan State*	Spartan Stadium; East Lansing, MI	BTN	L 7–35	70,712
September 19	12:30 p.m.	at Wisconsin*	Camp Randall Stadium; Madison, WI	NBCSN/Peacock	L 10–54	66,545
September 26	1:00 p.m.	Lindenwood*	Rynearson Stadium; Ypsilanti, MI	ESPN+	W 29–3	6,109
October 3	3:30 p.m.	at UMass	Warren McGuirk Alumni Stadium; Hadley, MA	ESPN+	W 38–14	17,119
October 10	3:30 p.m.	at Akron	InfoCision Stadium–Summa Field; Akron, OH	ESPN+	W 25–23	9,038
October 17	3:30 p.m.	Toledo^{†}	Rynearson Stadium; Ypsilanti, MI	ESPN+	L 14–34	10,373
October 24	4:00 p.m.	at Ohio	Peden Stadium; Athens, OH	ESPNU	L 20–24	18,813
November 4	7:30 p.m.	vs. Central Michigan	Ford Field; Detroit, MI (rivalry/Michigan MAC Trophy)	ESPN2	L 7–35	12,656
November 17	7:00 p.m.	at Western Michigan	Waldo Stadium; Kalamazoo, MI (Michigan MAC Trophy)	ESPN2	L 27–34	10,978
November 24	7:00 p.m.	Kent State	Rynearson Stadium; Ypsilanti, MI	ESPN+		
*Non-conference game; ^{†}Homecoming; All times are in Eastern time

== Game summaries ==
=== Sacramento State ===
Sacramento State Hornets (0–0) at Eastern Michigan Eagles (0–0) – Game summary

Quarter	1	2	3	4	Total
Hornets	0	10	0	7	17
Eagles	0	21	0	7	28

at Rynearson Stadium • Ypsilanti, Michigan

- Date: August 29
- Game time: 6:30 pm EDT
- Game weather: Sunny • Temperature: 82 °F (28 °C) • Wind: SW at 2 miles per hour (3.2 km/h)
- Game attendance: 9,401
- Referee: Matt Packowski
- TV announcers (ESPN+): Mick Tidrow and Je'Rod Cherry

Game information

First quarter

- No scoring plays.

Second quarter

- EMU – Noah Kim 5-yard run (Rudy Kessinger kick), 14:20. Eagles 7–0. Drive: 9 plays, 79 yards, 4:09.
- SAC– Grant Meadors 40-yard field goal, 9:24. Eagles 7–3. Drive: 7 plays, 6 yards, 2:44.
- EMU – Santonyo Issac 40-yard pass from Noah Kim (Rudy Kessinger kick), 7:50. Eagles 14–3. Drive: 3 plays, 74 yards, 1:27.
- EMU – Braydon Bennett 7-yard run (Rudy Kessinger kick), 5:07. Eagles 21–3. Drive: 3 plays, 15 yards, 1:35.
- SAC – Xavier Williams 29-yard fumble return, (Grant Meadors kick), 0:54. Eagles 21–10. Drive: 6 plays, 18 yards, 2:12

Third quarter

- No scoring plays.

Fourth quarter

- EMU – Nick Devereaux 31-yard pass from Noah Kim (Rudy Kessinger kick), 13:31. Eagles 28–10. Drive: 6 plays, 61 yards, 2:42.
- SAC – Isaiah Ene 1-yard run (Grant Meadors kick), 8:23. Eagles 28-17. Drive: 10 plays, 75 yards, 5:08.

Statistics	SAC	EMU
First downs	13	21
Plays–yards	63–270	68–348
Rushes–yards	17–49	30–69
Passing yards	221	279
Passing: comp–att–int	25–46–1	27–38–0
Turnovers	2	1
Time of possession	27:32	32:28

Team	Category	Player	Statistics
Sacramento State	Passing	Carson Conklin	25/46, 221 yards, INT
Sacramento State	Rushing	Isaiah Ene	3 carries, 47 yards, TD
Sacramento State	Receiving	Onterrio Smith Jr.	9 receptions, 88 yards
Eastern Michigan	Passing	Noah Kim	27/38, 279 yards, 2 TD
Eastern Michigan	Rushing	Amareon Blue	12 carries, 55 yards
Eastern Michigan	Receiving	Benson Prosper	7 receptions, 81 yards

=== San Jose State ===
San Jose State Spartans (0–1) at Eastern Michigan Eagles (1–0) – Game summary

Quarter	1	2	3	4	Total
Spartans	0	10	7	10	27
Eagles	0	7	14	0	21

at Rynearson Stadium • Ypsilanti, Michigan

- Date: September 4
- Game time: 6:30 p.m.
- Game weather: Cloudy • Temperature: 75 °F (24 °C) • Wind: NW 5 mph
- Game attendance: 5,646
- Referee: Rich Edwards
- TV announcers (ESPN+): Evan Stockton and Marcus Ray

Game information

First quarter

- No scoring plays.

Second quarter

- EMU – Harold Mack 5-yard pass from Noah Kim (Rudy Kessinger kick), 9:19. Eagles 7–0. Drive: 6 plays, 58 yards, 3:06.
- SJSU – Jase Nix 27-yard pass from Luke Weaver (Trajan Sinatra kick), 1:19. Tied 7–7. Drive: 4 plays, 80 yards, 0:28.
- SJSU – Trajan Sinatra 45-yard field goal, 0:00. Spartans 10–7. Drive: 7 plays, 37 yards, 0:48.

Third quarter

- EMU – Amareon Blue 50-yard run (Rudy Kessinger kick), 11:52. Eagles 14–10. Drive: 7 plays, 75 yards, 3:08.
- SJSU – Cooper Hoch 10-yard pass from Luke Weaver (Trajan Sinatra kick), 6:08. Spartans 17–14. Drive: 13 plays, 75 yards, 5:45.
- EMU – Bryce Llewellyn 1-yard fumble return (Rudy Kessinger kick), 0:53. Eagles 21–17.

Fourth quarter

- SJSU – Cooper Hoch 40-yard pass from Luke Weaver (Trajan Sinatra kick), 11:19. Spartans 24–21. Drive: 5 plays, 70 yards, 1:51.
- SJSU – Trajan Sinatra 49-yard field goal, 1:37. Spartans 27–21. Drive: 4 plays, -5 yards, 0:18.

Statistics	SJSU	EMU
First downs	19	13
Plays–yards	77–453	68–281
Rushes–yards	36–137	25–107
Passing yards	316	174
Passing: comp–att–int	23–41–1	24–43–1
Turnovers	2	1
Time of possession	29:52	30:08

Team	Category	Player	Statistics
San Jose State	Passing	Luke Weaver	23/39, 316 yards, 3 TD, INT
San Jose State	Rushing	Jabari Bates	20 carries, 119 yards
San Jose State	Receiving	Cooper Hoch	5 receptions, 115 yards, 2 TD
Eastern Michigan	Passing	Noah Kim	24/43, 174 yards, TD, INT
Eastern Michigan	Rushing	Amareon Blue	11 carries, 81 yards, TD
Eastern Michigan	Receiving	Harold Mack	7 receptions, 72 yards, TD

=== at Michigan State ===
Eastern Michigan Eagles (1–1) at Michigan State Spartans (1–0) – Game summary

Quarter	1	2	3	4	Total
Eagles	0	7	0	0	7
Spartans	7	7	14	7	35

at Spartan Stadium • East Lansing, Michigan

- Date: September 12
- Game time: 3:30 p.m.
- Game weather: Sunny • Temperature: 82 °F (28 °C) • Wind: N at 8 miles per hour (13 km/h)
- Game attendance: 70,712
- Referee: Tim Day
- TV announcers (BTN): Chris Vosters (play-by-play), Matt Millen (analyst) and Dannie Rogers (sideline)

Game information

First quarter

- MSU – Fredrick Moore 18-yard pass from Alessio Milivojevic (Liam Boyd kick), 6:32. Spartans 7–0. Drive: 3 plays, 24 yards, 0:27.

Second quarter

- MSU – Cam Edwards 1-yard run (Liam Boyd kick), 8:45. Spartans 14–0. Drive: 16 plays, 80 yards, 7:19.
- EMU – Noah Kim 4-yard run (Rudy Kessinger kick), 1:50. Spartans 14–7. Drive: 13 plays, 78 yards, 6:50.

Third quarter

- MSU – Cam Edwards 2-yard run (Liam Boyd kick), 8:50. Spartans 21–7. Drive: 13 plays, 75 yards, 6:10.
- MSU – Charles Taplin 38-yard pass from Alessio Milivojevic (Liam Boyd kick), 5:46. Spartans 28–7. Drive: 3 plays, 60 yards, 1:22.

Fourth quarter

- MSU – Jaziun Patterson 7-yard run (Liam Boyd kick), 7:48. Spartans 35–7. Drive: 3 plays, 53 yards, 1:12.

Statistics	EMU	MSU
First downs	13	26
Plays–yards	52–219	71–472
Rushes–yards	26–101	45–258
Passing yards	118	214
Passing: comp–att–int	16–26–0	18–26–0
Turnovers	1	1
Time of possession	28:39	31:21

Team	Category	Player	Statistics
Eastern Michigan	Passing	Noah Kim	16/26, 118 yards
Eastern Michigan	Rushing	Braydon Bennett	9 carries, 56 yards
Eastern Michigan	Receiving	Harold Mack	5 receptions, 49 yards
Michigan State	Passing	Alessio Milivojevic	12/20, 170 yards, 2 TD
Michigan State	Rushing	Cam Edwards	21 carries, 152 yards, 2 TD
Michigan State	Receiving	Charles Taplin	3 receptions, 65 yards, TD

=== at Wisconsin ===
Eastern Michigan Eagles (1–2) at Wisconsin Badgers (1–1) – Game summary

Quarter	1	2	3	4	Total
Eagles	7	0	0	3	10
Badgers	3	28	10	13	54

at Camp Randall Stadium • Madison, Wisconsin

- Date: September 19
- Game time: 12:30 p.m.
- Game weather: Rain, 66 °F (19 °C); Wind: SE 9 miles per hour (14 km/h)
- Game attendance: 66,545
- Referee: Jeffrey Servinski
- TV announcers (NBCSN/Peacock): Dave Flemming, Matt Cassel and Lewis Johnson

Game information

First quarter

- (9:24) EMU – Nick Devereaux 18-yard pass from Noah Kim, Rudy Kessinger kick (Drive: 8 plays, 67 yards, 3:06; Eastern Michigan 7–0)
- (0:06) WIS – Gavin Lahm 39-yard field goal (Drive: 14 plays, 70 yards, 7:20; Eastern Michigan 7–3)

Second quarter

- (8:12) WIS – Colton Joseph 4-yard run, Gavin Lahm kick (Drive: 11 plays, 74 yards, 5:56; Wisconsin 10–7)
- (6:44) WIS – Chris Brooks Jr. 75-yard pass from Colton Joseph, Gavin Lahm kick (Drive: 1 play, 75 yards, 0:10; Wisconsin 17–7)
- (2:52) WIS – Darrion Dupree 11-yard run, Gavin Lahm kick (Drive: 2 plays, 42 yards, 5:45; Wisconsin 24–7)
- (0:44) WIS – Tyrell Henry 13-yard pass from Colton Joseph, Gavin Lahm kick (Drive: 4 plays, 50 yards, 0:35; Wisconsin 31–7)

Third quarter

- (14:13) WIS – Cooper Catalano 10-yard fumble recovery, Gavin Lahm kick (Drive: 3 plays, -15 yards, 0:47; Wisconsin 38–7)
- (5:23) WIS – Gavin Lahm 41-yard field goal (Drive: 12 plays, 57 yards, 6:48; Wisconsin 41–7)

Fourth quarter

- (11:16) EMU – Rudy Kessinger 38-yard field goal (Drive: 16 plays, 70 yards, 9:01; Wisconsin 41–10)
- (4:44) WIS – Emmett Bork 7-yard pass from Colton Joseph, Gavin Lahm kick (Drive: 12 plays, 65 yards, 6:32; Wisconsin 48–10)
- (0:00) WIS – Donovan Dunmore 55-yard blocked field goal return (Drive: 11 plays, 35 yards, 4:44; Wisconsin 54–10)

Statistics	EMU	WIS
First downs	15	23
Plays–yards	60–216	63–479
Rushes–yards	30–62	30–117
Passing yards	154	362
Passing: comp–att–int	18–30–2	23–33–1
Turnovers	3	1
Time of possession	28:43	31:17

Team	Category	Player	Statistics
Eastern Michigan	Passing	Noah Kim	16/28, 140 yards, TD, 2 INT
Eastern Michigan	Rushing	Joey Mattord	9 carries, 37 yards
Eastern Michigan	Receiving	Nick Devereaux	3 receptions, 38 yards, TD
Wisconsin	Passing	Colton Joseph	23/33, 362 yards, 3 TD, INT
Wisconsin	Rushing	Colton Joseph	9 carries, 50 yards, TD
Wisconsin	Receiving	Tyrell Henry	14 receptions, 160 yards, TD

=== Lindenwood (FCS) ===
Lindenwood Lions (FCS) (1–2) at Eastern Michigan Eagles (1–3) – Game summary

Quarter	1	2	3	4	Total
Lions (FCS)	0	0	0	0	0
Eagles	0	0	0	0	0

at Rynearson Stadium • Ypsilanti, Michigan

- Date: September 26
- Game time: 1:00 p.m.
- Game attendance: 6,109
- TV announcers (ESPN+): Evan Stockton and Randy Buffington

Game information

First quarter
Second quarter
Third quarter
Fourth quarter

Statistics	LIN	EMU
First downs		
Plays–yards		
Rushes–yards		
Passing yards		
Passing: comp–att–int		
Turnovers		
Time of possession		

Team	Category	Player	Statistics
Lindenwood	Passing		
Lindenwood	Rushing		
Lindenwood	Receiving		
Eastern Michigan	Passing		
Eastern Michigan	Rushing		
Eastern Michigan	Receiving		

=== at UMass ===
Eastern Michigan Eagles (2–3) at UMass Minutemen (4–0) – Game summary

Quarter	1	2	3	4	Total
Eagles	0	0	0	0	0
Minutemen	0	0	0	0	0

at Warren McGuirk Alumni Stadium • Amherst, Massachusetts

- Date: October 3
- Game time: 3:30 p.m.
- Game attendance: 17,119
- TV: ESPN+

Game information

First quarter
Second quarter
Third quarter
Fourth quarter

Statistics	EMU	MASS
First downs		
Plays–yards		
Rushes–yards		
Passing yards		
Passing: comp–att–int		
Turnovers		
Time of possession		

Team	Category	Player	Statistics
Eastern Michigan	Passing		
Eastern Michigan	Rushing		
Eastern Michigan	Receiving		
UMass	Passing		
UMass	Rushing		
UMass	Receiving		

=== at Akron ===
Eastern Michigan Eagles (3–3) at Akron Zips (1–4) – Game summary

Quarter	1	2	3	4	Total
Eagles	0	0	0	0	0
Zips	0	0	0	0	0

at InfoCision Stadium–Summa Field • Akron, Ohio

- Date: October 10
- Game time: 3:30 p.m.
- Game attendance: 17,119
- TV: ESPN+

Game information

First quarter
Second quarter
Third quarter
Fourth quarter

Statistics	EMU	AKR
First downs		
Plays–yards		
Rushes–yards		
Passing yards		
Passing: comp–att–int		
Turnovers		
Time of possession		

Team	Category	Player	Statistics
Eastern Michigan	Passing		
Eastern Michigan	Rushing		
Eastern Michigan	Receiving		
Akron	Passing		
Akron	Rushing		
Akron	Receiving		

=== Toledo ===
Toledo Rockets (4–2) at Eastern Michigan Eagles (4–3) – Game summary

Quarter	1	2	3	4	Total
Rockets	10	21	3	0	34
Eagles	0	7	7	0	14

at Rynearson Stadium • Ypsilanti, Michigan

- Date: October 17
- Game time: 3:30 p.m.
- Game weather: Sunny • Temperature: 51 °F (11 °C) • Wind: W at 13 miles per hour (21 km/h)
- Game attendance: 10,373
- Referee: Billy Williams
- TV announcers (ESPN+): Shawn Kenny (play-by-play) and Marcus Ray (analyst)

Game information

First quarter

- TOL – Adjatay Dabbs 28-yard pass from John Alan Richter (Reice Griffith kick), 7:50. Rockets 7–0. Drive: 7 plays, 65 yards, 3:04.
- TOL – Reice Griffith 30-yard field goal, 6:21. Rockets 10–0. Drive: 4 plays, 2 yards, 1:22.

Second quarter

- TOL – CJ Miller 1-yard run (Reice Griffith kick), 14:13. Rockets 17–0. Drive: 11 plays, 65 yards, 6:00.
- EMU – Joshua Long 30-yard pass from Noah Kim (Rudy Kessinger kick), 10:46. Rockets 17–7. Drive: 8 plays, 73 yards, 3:18.
- TOL – Autavius Ison 13-yard run (Reice Griffith kick), 07:27. Rockets 24–7. Drive: 7 plays, 81 yards, 3:12.
- TOL – CJ Miller 3-yard run (Reice Griffith kick), 1:36. Rockets 31–7. Drive: 11 plays, 90 yards, 3:44.

Third quarter

- TOL – Reice Griffith 29-yard field goal, 10:54. Rockets 34–7. Drive: 4 plays, 1 yards, 0:46.
- EMU – Harold Mack 12-yard pass from Noah Kim (Rudy Kessinger kick), 3:57. Rockets 34–14. Drive: 11 plays, 68 yards, 3:25.

Fourth quarter

- No Scoring

Statistics	TOL	EMU
First downs	21	21
Plays–yards	70–480	71–276
Rushes–yards	40–192	28–34
Passing yards	288	242
Passing: comp–att–int	24–30–0	20–43–0
Turnovers	1	2
Time of possession	33:35	26:25

Team	Category	Player	Statistics
Toledo	Passing	John Alan Richter	24/30, 288 yards, TD
Toledo	Rushing	Autavius Ison	18 carries, 104 yards, TD
Toledo	Receiving	Bryson Hammer	5 receptions, 69 yards
Eastern Michigan	Passing	Noah Kim	16/36, 214 yards, 2 TD
Eastern Michigan	Rushing	Amareon Blue	7 carries, 23 yards
Eastern Michigan	Receiving	Joshua Long	7 receptions, 84 yards, TD

=== at Ohio ===
Eastern Michigan Eagles (4–4) at Ohio Bobcats (5–2) – Game summary

Quarter	1	2	3	4	Total
Eagles	0	13	0	7	20
Bobcats	7	3	7	7	24

at Peden Stadium • Athens, Ohio

- Date: October 24
- Game time: 4:00 p.m.
- Game weather: sunny, Temperature:65 °F (18 °C), Wind: SW 3 mph (4.8 km/h)
- Game attendance: 18,813
- Referee: Rich Edwards
- TV announcers (ESPNU): Doug Sherman (play-by-play) and Tyoka Jackson (analyst)

Game information

First quarter

- (05:48) OHIO – Dom Dorwart 78-yard pass from Nick Poulos (Will Hryszko kick) (Drive: 2 plays, 80 yards, 0:51; Ohio 7–0)

Second quarter

- (12:57) EMU – Aaron Kearse 25-yard fumble return (Rudy Kessinger kick) (Tied 7–7)
- (04:49) OHIO - Rudy Kessinger 31-yard field goal (Drive: 6 plays, 19 yards, 2:32, Eastern Michigan 10–3)
- (01:39) OHIO - Will Hryszko 49-yard field goal (Drive: 8 plays, 42 yards, 3:10, Tied 10–10)
- (00:00) EMU - Rudy Kessinger 41-yard field goal (Drive: 7 plays, 52 yards, 1:39, Eastern Michigan 13–10)

Third quarter

- (03:53) OHIO – Nick Poulos 1-yard run (Will Hryszko kick) (Drive: 6 plays, 78 yards, 3:21, Ohio 17–13)

Fourth quarter

- (03:53) EMU – Joey Mattord 24-yard pass from Brogan McCaughey (Rudy Kessinger kick) (Drive: 8 plays, 98 yards, 4:12; Eastern Michigan 20–17)
- (03:40) OHIO – Darren James-Hamilton 100-yard kickoff return (Will Hryszko kick) (Ohio 24–20)

Statistics	EMU	OHIO
First downs	18	17
Plays–yards	67–307	54–356
Rushes–yards	28–110	25–90
Passing yards	197	266
Passing: comp–att–int	27–39–1	19–29–0
Turnovers	1	2
Time of possession	32:32	27:28

Team	Category	Player	Statistics
Eastern Michigan	Passing	Brogan McCaughey	27/39, 197 yards, TD, INT
Eastern Michigan	Rushing	Amareon Blue	11 carries, 67 yards
Eastern Michigan	Receiving	Joey Mattord	7 receptions, 55 yards, TD
Ohio	Passing	Nick Poulos	19/29, 266 yards, TD
Ohio	Rushing	Victor Rosa	4 carries, 40 yards
Ohio	Receiving	Dom Dorwart	4 receptions, 125 yards, TD

=== vs. Central Michigan (rivalry) ===
Central Michigan Chippewas (3–5) vs. Eastern Michigan Eagles (4–5) – Game summary

Quarter	1	2	3	4	Total
Chippewas	0	0	0	0	0
Eagles	0	0	0	0	0

at Ford Field • Detroit, Michigan

- Date: November 4

Game information

First quarter
Second quarter
Third quarter
Fourth quarter

Statistics	CMU	EMU
First downs		
Plays–yards		
Rushes–yards		
Passing yards		
Passing: comp–att–int		
Turnovers		
Time of possession		

Team	Category	Player	Statistics
Central Michigan	Passing		
Central Michigan	Rushing		
Central Michigan	Receiving		
Eastern Michigan	Passing		
Eastern Michigan	Rushing		
Eastern Michigan	Receiving		

=== at Western Michigan (Michigan MAC Trophy) ===
Eastern Michigan Eagles (4–6) at Western Michigan Broncos (7–3) – Game summary

Quarter	1	2	3	4	Total
Eagles	0	0	0	0	0
Broncos	0	0	0	0	0

at Waldo Stadium • Kalamazoo, Michigan

- Date: November 17
- Game time: 7:00 p.m.

Game information

First quarter
Second quarter
Third quarter
Fourth quarter

Statistics	EMU	WMU
First downs		
Plays–yards		
Rushes–yards		
Passing yards		
Passing: comp–att–int		
Turnovers		
Time of possession		

Team	Category	Player	Statistics
Eastern Michigan	Passing		
Eastern Michigan	Rushing		
Eastern Michigan	Receiving		
Western Michigan	Passing		
Western Michigan	Rushing		
Western Michigan	Receiving		

=== Kent State ===
Kent State Golden Flashes (3–8) at Eastern Michigan Eagles (4–7) – Game summary

Quarter	1	2	3	4	Total
Golden Flashes	0	0	0	0	0
Eagles	0	0	0	0	0

at Rynearson Stadium • Ypsilanti, Michigan

- Date: November 24

Game information

First quarter
Second quarter
Third quarter
Fourth quarter

Statistics	KENT	EMU
First downs		
Plays–yards		
Rushes–yards		
Passing yards		
Passing: comp–att–int		
Turnovers		
Time of possession		

Team	Category	Player	Statistics
Kent State	Passing		
Kent State	Rushing		
Kent State	Receiving		
Eastern Michigan	Passing		
Eastern Michigan	Rushing		
Eastern Michigan	Receiving		
