= 2026 Central Michigan Chippewas football team =

American college football season

2026 Central Michigan Chippewas football
- Conference: Mid-American Conference
- Record: 5–6 (3–4 MAC)
- Head coach: Matt Drinkall (2nd season)
- Offensive coordinator: Jim Chapin (2nd season)
- Co-offensive coordinator: Derek Fulton (2nd season)
- Offensive scheme: Pro spread
- Defensive coordinator: Sean Cronin (2nd season)
- Base defense: 3–4
- Home stadium: Kelly/Shorts Stadium

2026 Mid-American Conference football standings
	Conf.			Overall
Team	W		L	W		L
Ohio	6	–	1	8	–	3
Western Michigan	6	–	1	8	–	3
Buffalo	6	–	1	8	–	3
Toledo	5	–	1	8	–	2
Miami (OH)	5	–	2	7	–	4
Bowling Green	3	–	3	3	–	7
Central Michigan	3	–	4	5	–	6
Eastern Michigan	3	–	4	4	–	7
UMass	2	–	5	5	–	6
Kent State	2	–	5	3	–	8
Ball State	2	–	5	3	–	8
Akron	1	–	6	2	–	9
Sacramento State	1	–	7	2	–	9
Championship: December 5, 2026
As of November 19, 2026; Rankings from AP poll

The 2026 Central Michigan Chippewas football team is who represents Central Michigan University during in the Mid-American Conference (MAC) during the 2026 NCAA Division I FBS football season. The Chippewas are led by Matt Drinkall in his second year as the head coach of the program. The Chippewas play their home games at Kelly/Shorts Stadium, which is located in Mount Pleasant, Michigan

== Schedule ==
Date	Time	Opponent	Site	TV	Result	Attendance
September 5	10:00 p.m.	at New Mexico*	University Stadium; Albuquerque, NM	FS1	L 7–38	24,126
September 12	1:00 p.m.	Colgate*	Kelly/Shorts Stadium; Mount Pleasant, MI	ESPN+	W 13–10	19,005
September 19	1:00 p.m.	Wyoming*	Kelly/Shorts Stadium; Mount Pleasant, MI	ESPN+	W 24–10	15,552
September 26	6:30 p.m.	at No. 6 Miami (FL)*	Hard Rock Stadium; Miami Gardens, FL	The CW	L 3–52	65,338
October 3	3:30 p.m.	Akron	Kelly/Shorts Stadium; Mount Pleasant, MI	ESPN+	W 41–17	20,102
October 10	3:30 p.m.	at Ohio	Peden Stadium; Athens, OH	ESPN+	L 14–31	21,368
October 17	1:30 p.m.	Western Michigan	Kelly/Shorts Stadium; Mount Pleasant, MI (rivalry, Michigan MAC Trophy)	ESPN+	L 14–21	25,352
October 24	1:00 p.m.	Miami (OH)	Kelly/Shorts Stadium; Mount Pleasant, MI	ESPN+	L 27–28	13,269
November 4	7:30 p.m.	vs. Eastern Michigan	Ford Field; Detroit, MI (rivalry, Michigan MAC Trophy)	ESPN2	W 35–7	12,656
November 11	7:30 p.m.	Sacramento State	Kelly/Shorts Stadium; Mount Pleasant, MI	ESPNU	W 28–7	8,568
November 18	7:30 p.m.	at Buffalo	Broadview Stadium; Amherst, NY	ESPNU	L 21–40	5,452
November 28	12:00 p.m.	at Ball State	Scheumann Stadium; Muncie, IN	CBSSN	–	
*Non-conference game; Rankings from AP Poll (and CFP Rankings, from the date when issued) - Released prior to game; All times are in Eastern time

== Game summaries ==
=== at New Mexico ===
Central Michigan Chippewas (0–0) at New Mexico Lobos (0–0) – Game summary

Quarter	1	2	3	4	Total
Chippewas	0	0	0	7	7
Lobos	7	13	15	3	38

at University Stadium • Albuquerque, NM

- Date: September 5
- Game time: 9:15 p.m.
- Game weather: 85 °F (29 °C), cloudy, NW 9 miles per hour (14 km/h)
- Game attendance: 24,126
- Referee: Christian Watson
- TV announcers (FS1): Carlo Jimenez and Petros Papadakis

Game information

First quarter

- (7:18) UNM – Scottre Humphrey 7-yard run, Grant Glasgow kick (Drive: 9 plays, 78 yards, 3:57; New Mexico 7–0)

Second quarter

- (12:56) UNM – James Laubstein 1-yard run, Grant Glasgow kick (Drive: 15 plays, 64 yards, 7:41; New Mexico 14–0)
- (8:19) UNM – Grant Glasgow 48-yard field goal (Drive: 9 plays, 33 yards, 3:40; New Mexico 17–0)
- (1:04) UNM – Grant Glasgow 46-yard field goal (Drive: 10 plays, 60 yards, 6:10; New Mexico 20–0)

Third quarter

- (7:05) UNM – James Laubstein 3-yard run, Scottre Humphrey run (Drive: 9 plays, 80 yards, 4:30; New Mexico 28–0)
- (4:03) UNM – Bailen George 11-yard pass from Luke Moga, Grant Glasgow kick (Drive: 3 plays, 39 yards, 1:31; New Mexico 35–0)

Fourth quarter

- (9:31) UNM – Grant Glasgow 49-yard field goal (Drive: 7 plays, 6 yards, 4:36; New Mexico 38–0)
- (4:23) CMU – Nasir Williams 23-yard run, Caden VanHuis kick (Drive: 10 plays, 75 yards, 5:08; New Mexico 38–7)

Statistics	CMU	UNM
First downs	9	28
Plays–yards	48–149	69–364
Rushes–yards	32–119	44–205
Passing yards	30	159
Passing: comp–att–int	7–16–1	17–25–0
Turnovers	2	0
Time of possession	22:31	37:29

Team	Category	Player	Statistics
Central Michigan	Passing	Jadyn Glasser	4/10, 16 yards
Central Michigan	Rushing	Angel Flores	10 carries, 27 yards
Central Michigan	Receiving	Justin Ruffin Jr.	3 receptions, 9 yards
New Mexico	Passing	Luke Moga	13/17, 116 yards, TD
New Mexico	Rushing	Scottre Humphrey	13 carries, 64 yards, TD
New Mexico	Receiving	Bailen George	4 receptions, 36 yards, TD

=== Colgate (FCS) ===
Colgate Raiders (FCS) (2–0) at Central Michigan Chippewas (0–1) – Game summary

Quarter	1	2	3	4	Total
Raiders (FCS)	0	10	0	0	10
Chippewas	0	0	6	7	13

at Kelly/Shorts Stadium • Mount Pleasant, Michigan

- Date: September 12
- Game time: 1:00 p.m.
- Game weather: Sunny • Temperature: 76 °F (24 °C) • Wind: NE at 8 miles per hour (13 km/h)
- Game attendance: 19,005
- Referee: Rich Edwards
- TV announcers (ESPN+): Dan Gutowsky and Ahman Green

Game information

First quarter

- No scoring plays.

Second quarter

- COLG – Jake Stearney 3-yard run (Luke Vogeler kick), 11:48. Raiders 7–0. Drive: 11 plays, 42 yards, 4:46.
- COLG – Luke Vogeler 48-yard field goal, 0:36. Raiders 10–0. Drive: 4 plays, 4 yards, 0:38.

Third quarter

- CMU – Angel Flores 50-yard run (Caden VanHuis kick BLOCKED), 0:24. Raiders 10–6. Drive: 10 plays, 87 yards, 5:23.

Fourth quarter

- CMU – Vaughn Blue 6-yard run (Caden VanHuis kick), 7:29. Chippewas 13–10. Drive: 9 plays, 65 yards, 4:30.

Statistics	COLG	CMU
First downs	15	16
Plays–yards	62–219	63–276
Rushes–yards	31–95	42–200
Passing yards	124	76
Passing: comp–att–int	16–31–2	10–21–2
Turnovers	4	3
Time of possession	27:19	32:41

Team	Category	Player	Statistics
Colgate	Passing	Jake Stearney	16/31, 124 yards, 2 INT
Colgate	Rushing	Danny Shaban	22 carries, 87 yards
Colgate	Receiving	Kam Phillips	3 receptions, 43 yards
Central Michigan	Passing	Angel Flores	7/13, 57 yards, INT
Central Michigan	Rushing	Angel Flores	22 carries, 122 yards, TD
Central Michigan	Receiving	Vaughn Blue	3 receptions, 29 yards

=== Wyoming ===
Wyoming Cowboys (1–1) at Central Michigan Chippewas (1–1) – Game summary

Quarter	1	2	3	4	Total
Cowboys	0	0	3	7	10
Chippewas	3	14	7	0	24

at Kelly/Shorts Stadium • Mount Pleasant, Michigan

- Date: September 19
- Game time: 1:00 p.m.
- Game weather: Rain • Temperature: 59 °F (15 °C)
- Game attendance: 15,552
- Referee: Andrew Speciale
- TV announcers (ESPN+): Doug Sherman and Marcus Ray

Game information

First quarter
Second quarter
Third quarter
Fourth quarter

Statistics	WYO	CMU
First downs	17	20
Plays–yards	59–340	66–371
Rushes–yards	28–160	59–339
Passing yards	180	32
Passing: comp–att–int	15–31–2	4–7–0
Turnovers	2	0
Time of possession	24:12	35:48

Team	Category	Player	Statistics
Wyoming	Passing	Tyler Hughes	14/30, 173 yards, 2 INT
Wyoming	Rushing	Tyler Hughes	10 carries, 78 yards
Wyoming	Receiving	Kyle Frendt	4 receptions, 95 yards
Central Michigan	Passing	Angel Flores	4/7, 32 yards
Central Michigan	Rushing	Angel Flores	28 carries, 163 yards, 2 TD
Central Michigan	Receiving	Shawn Foster	1 reception, 13 yards

=== at No. 6 Miami (FL) ===
Central Michigan Chippewas (2–1) at No. 6 Miami Hurricanes (3–0) – Game summary

Quarter	1	2	3	4	Total
Chippewas	3	0	0	0	3
No. 6 Hurricanes	7	28	7	10	52

at Hard Rock Stadium • Miami Gardens, Florida

- Date: September 26
- Game time: 6:30 p.m.
- Game weather: Sunny • Temperature: 86 °F (30 °C) • Wind: NW at 5 miles per hour (8.0 km/h)
- Game attendance: 65,338
- Referee: Garrett Dickerson
- TV announcers (The CW): Thom Brennaman, Jason Cabinda, and Wes Bryant

Statistics	CMU	MIA
First downs	10	31
Plays–yards	51–158	68–572
Rushes–yards	25–21	34–201
Passing yards	137	371
Passing: comp–att–int	21–26–1	27–34–0
Turnovers	3	0
Time of possession	28:50	31:10

Team	Category	Player	Statistics
Central Michigan	Passing	Jadyn Glasser	13/15, 88 yards, INT
Central Michigan	Rushing	Nick Woodford	6 carries, 21 yards
Central Michigan	Receiving	Tayte Vanderleest	1 reception, 24 yards
Miami (FL)	Passing	Darian Mensah	23/27, 338 yards, 3 TD
Miami (FL)	Rushing	Chris Wheatley-Humphrey	11 carries, 104 yards, TD
Miami (FL)	Receiving	Malachi Toney	6 receptions, 120 yards, TD

=== Akron ===
Akron Zips (1–3) at Central Michigan Chippewas (2–2) – Game summary

Quarter	1	2	3	4	Total
Zips	0	7	3	7	17
Chippewas	0	21	14	6	41

at Kelly/Shorts Stadium • Mount Pleasant, Michigan

- Date: October 3
- Game time: 3:30 PM
- Game weather: Sunny • Temperature: 62 °F (17 °C) • Wind: W at 3 miles per hour (4.8 km/h)
- Game attendance: 20,102
- Referee: Billy Williams
- TV announcers (ESPN+): Evan Stockton (play-by-play) and Barrett Brooks (analyst)
- ESPN game summary

Game information

First quarter

- No scoring

Second quarter

- AKR – Jordan Gant 9-yard run (Matthew Schramm kick), 13:59 (AKR 7–0)
- CMU – Angel Flores 55-yard run (Caden VanHuis kick), 10:37 (Tied 7–7)
- CMU – Shawn Foster 48-yard pass from Angel Flores (Caden VanHuis kick), 7:32 (CMU 14–7)
- CMU – Brock Townsend 5-yard run (Caden VanHuis kick), 0:18 (CMU 21–7)

Third quarter

- CMU – Nick Woodford 27-yard run (Caden VanHuis kick), 11:34 (CMU 28–7)
- AKR – Matthew Schramm 29-yard field goal, 7:43 (CMU 28–10)
- CMU – Jayden Clerveaux 23-yard run (Caden VanHuis kick), 3:35 (CMU 35–10)

Fourth quarter

- CMU – Langston Lewis 71-yard pass from Jadyn Glasser (Caden VanHuis kick failed), 5:32 (CMU 41–10)
- AKR – Brandon Hills 8-yard pass from Brayden Roggow (Matthew Schramm kick), 0:33 (CMU 41–17)

Statistics	AKR	CMU
First downs	20	20
Plays–yards	68–340	62–481
Rushes–yards	36–160	45–332
Passing yards	180	149
Passing: comp–att–int	15–32–3	8–17–0
Turnovers	3	1
Time of possession	30:40	29:20

Team	Category	Player	Statistics
Akron	Passing	Brayden Roggow	15/32, 180 yards, TD, 3 INT
Akron	Rushing	Jordan Gant	17 carries, 102 yards, TD
Akron	Receiving	Marcel Williams	2 receptions, 36 yards
Central Michigan	Passing	Angel Flores	7/14, 78 yards, TD
Central Michigan	Rushing	Angel Flores	18 carries, 154 yards, TD
Central Michigan	Receiving	Langston Lewis	1 reception, 71 yards, TD

=== at Ohio ===
Central Michigan Chippewas (3–2) at Ohio Bobcats (3–2) – Game summary

Quarter	1	2	3	4	Total
Chippewas	0	0	7	7	14
Bobcats	14	17	0	0	31

at Peden Stadium • Athens, Ohio

- Date: October 10
- Game time: 3:30 p.m.
- Game weather: Cloudy, Temperature:61 °F (16 °C), Wind: E 5 mph (8.0 km/h)
- Game attendance: 21,368
- Referee: Matt Packowski
- TV announcers (ESPN+): Jason Ross (play-by-play) and Tyoka Jackson (analyst)

Game information

First quarter

- (11:01) OHIO – Duncan Brune 23-yard run (Will Hryszko kick) (Drive: 8 plays, 70 yards, 3:54, Ohio 7–0)
- (00:39) OHIO – Riley Neer 3-yard pass from Nick Poulos (Will Hryszko kick) (Drive: 8 plays, 65 yards, 7:58; Ohio 14–0)

Second quarter

- (10:28) OHIO - Will Hryszko 24-yard field goal (Drive: 9 plays, 52 yards, 3:32, Ohio 17–0)
- (05:24) OHIO – Preston Bowman 1-yard pass from Nick Poulos (Will Hryszko kick) (Drive: 8 plays, 35 yards, 4:06; Ohio 24–0)
- (00:06) OHIO – Dom Dorwart 44-yard pass from Nick Poulos (Will Hryszko kick) (Drive: 3 plays, 62 yards, 0:30; Ohio 31–0)

Third quarter

- (00:25) CMU – Jayden Clerveaux 15-yard run (Caden VanHuis kick) (Drive: 8 plays, 73 yards, 3:40; Ohio 31–7)

Fourth quarter

- (01:39) CMU – Nick Woodford 15-yard run (Caden VanHuis kick) (Drive: 8 plays, 79 yards, 3:29; Ohio 31–14)

Statistics	CMU	OHIO
First downs	14	23
Total yards	56–275	68–403
Rushing yards	32–121	50–245
Passing yards	154	158
Passing: Comp–Att–Int	17–24–0	11–18–0
Time of possession	26:04	33:56

Team	Category	Player	Statistics
Central Michigan	Passing	Angel Flores	14/20, 112 yards
Central Michigan	Rushing	Nick Woodford	3 carries, 27 yards, TD
Central Michigan	Receiving	Braylen Naves	4 receptions, 56 yards
Ohio	Passing	Nick Poulos	11/18, 158 yards, 3 TD
Ohio	Rushing	Duncan Brune	16 carries, 91 yards, TD
Ohio	Receiving	Riley Neer	4 receptions, 59 yards, TD

=== Western Michigan (rivalry) ===
Western Michigan Broncos (4–2) at Central Michigan Chippewas (3–3) – Game summary

Quarter	1	2	3	4	Total
Broncos	0	0	0	0	0
Chippewas	0	0	0	0	0

at Kelly/Shorts Stadium • Mount Pleasant, Michigan

- Date: October 17

Game information

First quarter
Second quarter
Third quarter
Fourth quarter

Statistics	WMU	CMU
First downs		
Plays–yards		
Rushes–yards		
Passing yards		
Passing: comp–att–int		
Turnovers		
Time of possession		

Team	Category	Player	Statistics
Western Michigan	Passing		
Western Michigan	Rushing		
Western Michigan	Receiving		
Central Michigan	Passing		
Central Michigan	Rushing		
Central Michigan	Receiving		

=== Miami (OH) ===
Miami RedHawks (4–3) at Central Michigan Chippewas (3–4) – Game summary

Quarter	1	2	3	4	Total
RedHawks	0	0	0	0	0
Chippewas	0	0	0	0	0

at Kelly/Shorts Stadium • Mount Pleasant, Michigan

- Date: October 24
- TV announcers (ESPN+): Evan Stockton play by play & Marcus Ray analyst

Statistics	M-OH	CMU
First downs		
Total yards		
Rushing yards		
Passing yards		
Passing: Comp–Att–Int		
Turnovers		
Time of possession		

Team	Category	Player	Statistics
Miami (OH)	Passing		
Miami (OH)	Rushing		
Miami (OH)	Receiving		
Central Michigan	Passing		
Central Michigan	Rushing		
Central Michigan	Receiving		

=== vs. Eastern Michigan (rivalry) ===
Central Michigan Chippewas (3–5) vs. Eastern Michigan Eagles (4–5) – Game summary

Quarter	1	2	3	4	Total
Chippewas	0	0	0	0	0
Eagles	0	0	0	0	0

at Ford Field • Detroit, Michigan

- Date: November 4

Game information

First quarter
Second quarter
Third quarter
Fourth quarter

Statistics	CMU	EMU
First downs		
Plays–yards		
Rushes–yards		
Passing yards		
Passing: comp–att–int		
Turnovers		
Time of possession		

Team	Category	Player	Statistics
Central Michigan	Passing		
Central Michigan	Rushing		
Central Michigan	Receiving		
Eastern Michigan	Passing		
Eastern Michigan	Rushing		
Eastern Michigan	Receiving		

=== Sacramento State ===
Sacramento State Hornets (2–8) at Central Michigan Chippewas (4–5) – Game summary

Quarter	1	2	3	4	Total
Hornets	0	0	0	0	0
Chippewas	0	0	0	0	0

at Kelly/Shorts Stadium • Mount Pleasant, Michigan

- Date: November 11

Game information

First quarter

Second quarter

Third quarter

Fourth quarter

Statistics	SAC	CMU
First downs		
Plays–yards		
Rushes–yards		
Passing yards		
Passing: comp–att–int		
Turnovers		
Time of possession		

Team	Category	Player	Statistics
Sacramento State	Passing		
Sacramento State	Rushing		
Sacramento State	Receiving		
Central Michigan	Passing		
Central Michigan	Rushing		
Central Michigan	Receiving		

=== at Buffalo ===
Central Michigan Chippewas (5–5) at Buffalo Bulls (7–3) – Game summary

Quarter	1	2	3	4	Total
Chippewas	0	0	0	0	0
Bulls	0	0	0	0	0

at Broadview Stadium • Amherst, New York

- Date: November 18

Game information

First quarter
Second quarter
Third quarter
Fourth quarter

Statistics	CMU	BUFF
First downs		
Plays–yards		
Rushes–yards		
Passing yards		
Passing: comp–att–int		
Turnovers		
Time of possession		

Team	Category	Player	Statistics
Central Michigan	Passing		
Central Michigan	Rushing		
Central Michigan	Receiving		
Buffalo	Passing		
Buffalo	Rushing		
Buffalo	Receiving		

=== at Ball State ===
Central Michigan Chippewas (5–6) at Ball State Cardinals (3–8) – Game summary

Quarter	1	2	3	4	Total
Chippewas	0	0	0	0	0
Cardinals	0	0	0	0	0

at Scheumann Stadium • Muncie, Indiana

- Date: November 28
- Game time: 12:00 p.m.

Statistics	CMU	BALL
First downs		
Plays–yards		
Rushes–yards		
Passing yards		
Passing: comp–att–int		
Turnovers		
Time of possession		

Team	Category	Player	Statistics
Central Michigan	Passing		
Central Michigan	Rushing		
Central Michigan	Receiving		
Ball State	Passing		
Ball State	Rushing		
Ball State	Receiving		
