= Kurt Mattix =

American football player and coach (born 1975)

Current position
- Title: Defensive coordinator
- Team: Ohio
- Conference: MAC

Biographical details
- Born: September 9, 1975 (age 51)
- Education: Valparaiso

Playing career
- 1994–1995: Indianapolis
- 1996–1998: Valparaiso

Coaching career (HC unless noted)
- 1998–1999: Portage High School (IN) (OL/DL)
- 2000: Trine (ST/LB)
- 2001: Anderson (IN) (ST/LB)
- 2002–2003: Ball State (GA)
- 2004: Wayne State (DB)
- 2005–2007: Wayne State (DC)
- 2008: Saint Joseph's (IN) (AHC/DC)
- 2009–2010: Ball State (TE)
- 2011–2014: Michigan (QC)
- 2015: Valparaiso (ST/LB)
- 2016–2019: Eastern Kentucky (DC/LB)
- 2020–2023: San Diego State (DC/LB)
- 2024: Ohio (DE)
- 2025: Charlotte (Co-DC/DL)
- 2026–present: Ohio (DC)

Kurt Mattix (born September 9, 1975) is an American football coach and former football player. He is currently the defensive coordinator and coach at Ohio. He has also been the defensive coordinator at Charlotte, San Diego State and Eastern Kentucky.

== Playing career ==
Mattix is an alumnus of the Valparaiso where he played college football from 1996 to 1998 and received his bachelor's degree in physical education in 1999. Previously he played football for two seasons at the University of Indianapolis from 1994 to 1995.

== Coaching career ==
Mattix's first coaching position was as an assistant at Portage High School in Indiana from 1998 to 1998. He was the special teams coordinator and linebacker's coach at Trine University in 1999 and Anderson University in 2000. His first FBS coaching job was as a Graduate Assistant at Ball State from 2002 through 2003. He spent the next four seasons at Wayne State University where he had is first position as a defensive coordinator during the last three seasons from 2005 to 2007. He returned to the state of Indiana as the assistant head coach and defensive coordinator at Saint Joseph's College for one year in 2008. He returned to Ball State as the tight ends coach for two seasons before joining Brady Hoke's staff as a quality control assistant at Michigan from 2011 to 2014.

After Hoke was fired he went back to his alma mater as the special teams coordinator and linebackers coach at Valparaiso in 2015 before getting his first NCAA Division I coordinator job at Eastern Kentucky from 2016 through 2019. He rejoined with Hoke as the defensive coordinator and linebackers coach at San Diego State from 2020 to 2023. His defenses ranked 1st, 2nd, 4th, and 8th in the Mountain West Conference from 2020 to 2023 respectively. After the 2020 season he was nominated for the Broyles Award for the best assistant coach in the nation. Prior to the 2024 season he accepted the position as defensive ends coach at Ohio under Tim Albin. He followed Albin to Charlotte as a co-defensive coordinator for the 2025 season before returning to Ohio as defensive coordinator in 2026.
