= William Watson =

William, Willie, Bill or Billy Watson may refer to:

== Arts ==
- William Watson (songwriter) (1794–1840), English concert hall singer and songwriter
- William Watson (poet) (1858–1935), English poet
- William J. Watson (1865–1948), Scottish teacher and toponymist
- Billy Watson (actor) (1923–2022), American actor
- William Watson (writer) (1930–2005), also known as Bill Watson, Scottish writer
- William C. Watson (1938–1997), American actor
- Willie Watson (musician) (born 1979), American folk musician

== Military ==
- William H. Watson (1815–1846), Mexican–American War soldier from Maryland, U.S.
- William Watson (sergeant) (1826–1906), in the Confederate States Army
- William Watson (surgeon) (1837–1879), in Pennsylvania Volunteers during the American Civil War
- William Thornton Watson (1887–1961), New Zealand officer in the Australian Imperial Force
- William E. Watson, military historian

== Politics ==
- William Watson (16th century MP), MP for the City of York
- William Henry Watson (1796–1860), British politician and judge
- William Watson (New South Wales politician) (1815–1877), Australian politician
- William John Watson (1839–1886), Australian politician
- William T. Watson (1849–1917), American banker and governor of Delaware
- William W. Watson Sr., 19th century North Carolina politician
- William Watson (Australian politician) (1864–1938)
- William McLean Watson (1874–1962), Scottish politician
- W. Marvin Watson (1924–2017), U.S. postmaster general
- William Watson, mayor of Rockford, Illinois, U.S., 1878–79

== Science ==
- William Watson (scientist) (1715–1787), English physician and scientist
- William Watson (physician) (1744–1824), English physician and naturalist
- William Watson (surveyor and scientist) (1784–1857), cartographer and sundial-maker from Seaton Ross
- William Livingstone Watson (1835–1903), Scottish East India merchant and astronomer
- Watson Cheyne or Sir William Watson (1852–1932), 1st Baronet Cheyne, Scottish surgeon and bacteriologist
- William Watson (botanist) (1858–1925), British botanist and horticulturalist
- William Watson (physicist, born 1868) (1868–1919), British physicist
- William Watson (Scottish physicist) (1884–1952), FRSE Scottish physicist and mathematician
- William Weldon Watson (1899–1992), American nuclear physicist

== Sports ==
=== Association football ===
- William Watson (footballer, born 1873) (1873–1929), Scottish footballer (Falkirk FC and Scotland)
- Billy Watson (footballer, born 1890) (1890–1955), English international footballer with Burnley, 1908–1925
- Billy Watson (footballer, born 1893) (1893–1962), English footballer with Huddersfield Town, 1912–1927
- William Watson (footballer, fl. 1903–1909), Lincoln City footballer active in the 1900s
- Bill Watson (footballer, born 1899) (1899–1969), English footballer in the 1920s–30s
- Bill Watson (footballer, born 1916) (1916–1986), English footballer, fullback for Lincoln City, Chesterfield and Rochdale
- William Watson (footballer, born 1900) (1900–?), Scottish footballer (Dumbarton FC)
- Willie Watson (footballer, born 1910), Scottish footballer (Hibernian, Ayr United)
- Jimmy Watson (footballer, born 1914) (1914–1979), aka Bill Watson (William James Boyd Watson), English footballer in the 1930s
- Billy Watson (soccer), Scottish-American footballer in the 1920s–30s
- Billy Watson (Scottish footballer) (died 1950), Bradford City A.F.C. footballer, 1921–1931
- Willie Watson (English footballer), full-back for Northampton Town
- Willie Watson (English cricketer) (1920–2004), English cricketer and footballer
- Willie Watson (footballer, born 1949) (1949–2026), Scottish footballer (Manchester United, Motherwell)
- Graham Watson (footballer, born 1949), English footballer, aka "Willie" Watson

=== Cricket ===
- William Watson (cricketer, born 1881) (1881–1926), Australian cricketer
- Willie Watson (English cricketer) (1920–2004), English cricketer and footballer
- Bill Watson (cricketer) (1931–2018), Australian cricketer
- Willie Watson (New Zealand cricketer) (born 1965)

=== Rugby ===
- Billy Watson (rugby union) (1869–1953), member of the 1893 New Zealand rugby union team
- Bill Watson (rugby union) (born 1949), Scotland international rugby union player
- Billy Watson (rugby league), footballer of the 1930s for England, and Keighley

=== Other sports ===
- William Watson (motoring pioneer) (1873–1961), British racing driver and motoring pioneer
- William Watson (weightlifter) (1918–1998), British Olympic weightlifter
- Whipper Billy Watson (1915–1990), Canadian wrestler
- William Watson (decathlete) (1916–1973), aka "Big Bill" Watson, American track and field athlete
- William Watson (basketball) (fl. 1920s), African-American basketball player
- Bill Watson (baseball), American baseball player
- Bill Watson (ice hockey) (born 1964), ice hockey player in Minnesota
- Willie Watson (bowls), Irish international lawn bowler
- William Poss Watson (1868–1950), Australian rules footballer
- Pop Watson (William Waverly Watson III, born 2004), American football player

== Other people ==
- William Watson (bow maker) (1930–2018), British bow maker
- William Watson (chess player) (born 1962), English chess grandmaster
- William Watson (economist), Canadian economist, member of the research advisory board for Macdonald–Laurier Institute
- William Watson (merchant) (died 1559), English merchant and shipowner
- William Watson (priest) (1559–1603), English Roman Catholic priest and conspirator
- William Watson (sinologist) (1917–2007), professor of Chinese art and archaeology at London University
- William Watson, Baron Watson (1827–1899), Scottish judge
- William Watson, Baron Thankerton (1873–1948), Scottish judge
- William R. Watson (1887–1973), Canadian art dealer
- Sir William Renny Watson (1838–1900), British engineer and businessman

== Other uses ==
- SS William L. Watson, a Liberty ship
