= 2026 UMass Minutemen football team =

American college football season

2026 UMass Minutemen football
- Conference: Mid-American Conference
- Record: 5–6 (2–5 MAC)
- Head coach: Joe Harasymiak (2nd season)
- Offensive coordinator: Max Warner (1st season)
- Offensive scheme: Pro spread
- Defensive coordinator: Jared Keyte (2nd season)
- Base defense: Multiple 4–2–5
- Home stadium: Warren McGuirk Alumni Stadium

Uniform
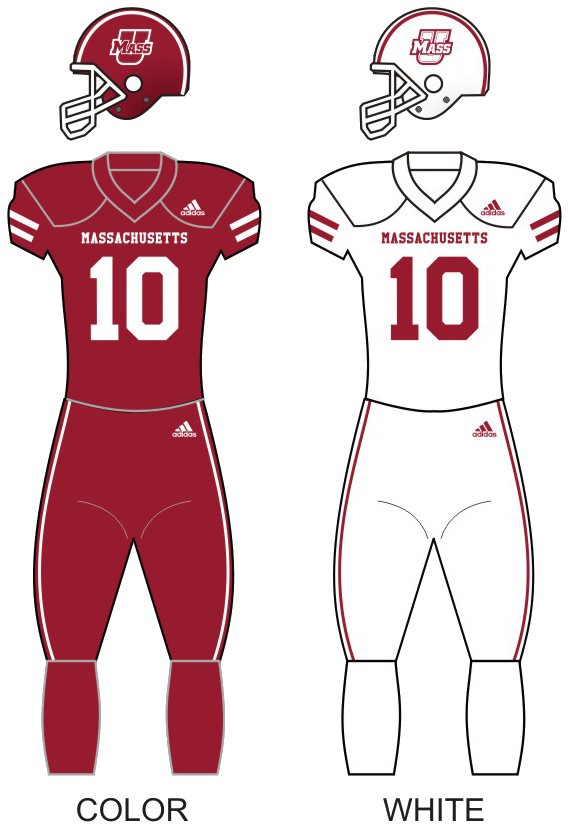

2026 Mid-American Conference football standings
	Conf.			Overall
Team	W		L	W		L
Ohio	6	–	1	8	–	3
Western Michigan	6	–	1	8	–	3
Buffalo	6	–	1	8	–	3
Toledo	5	–	1	8	–	2
Miami (OH)	5	–	2	7	–	4
Bowling Green	3	–	3	3	–	7
Central Michigan	3	–	4	5	–	6
Eastern Michigan	3	–	4	4	–	7
UMass	2	–	5	5	–	6
Kent State	2	–	5	3	–	8
Ball State	2	–	5	3	–	8
Akron	1	–	6	2	–	9
Sacramento State	1	–	7	2	–	9
Championship: December 5, 2026
As of November 19, 2026; Rankings from AP poll

The 2026 UMass Minutemen football team is who represents the University of Massachusetts Amherst during the 2026 NCAA Division I FBS football season. They play their home games on campus at Warren McGuirk Alumni Stadium in Hadley, Massachusetts, and they compete as a member of the Mid-American Conference (MAC). They are led by second-year head coach Joe Harasymiak.

In the previous season, UMass went 0–12 and entered the 2026 season on a 16-game losing streak dating back to the 2024 season. In the season opener against Rutgers, the Minutemen upset the Scarlet Knights 37–21, ending their losing streak and earning their first win against an FBS opponent since 2023, and the first time they beat a power conference team since 1978.

== Preseason ==
=== MAC prediction poll ===
The MAC released its preseason coaches poll on July 22, 2026. The Minutemen were predicted to finish 13th (last) in the conference.

== Schedule ==
Date	Time	Opponent	Site	TV	Result	Attendance	Source
September 3	6:00 p.m.	at Rutgers*	SHI Stadium; Piscataway, NJ	BTN	W 37–21	42,454	
September 12	3:30 p.m.	Sacred Heart*	Warren McGuirk Alumni Stadium; Hadley, MA	ESPN+	W 37–10	14,895	
September 19	3:30 p.m.	Stonehill*	Warren McGuirk Alumni Stadium; Hadley, MA	ESPN+	W 36–14	12,233	
September 26	9:00 p.m.	at Sacramento State	Hornet Stadium; Sacramento, CA	ESPN+	W 35–6	11,007	
October 3	3:30 p.m.	Eastern Michigan	Warren McGuirk Alumni Stadium; Hadley, MA	ESPN+	L 14–38	17,119	
October 10	2:00 p.m.	Miami (OH)	Warren McGuirk Alumni Stadium; Hadley, MA	ESPN+	L 19–20	13,887	
October 17	1:00 p.m.	at Buffalo	Broadview Stadium; Amherst, NY	ESPN+	L 18–25 ^{OT}	6,037	
October 23	7:00 p.m.	at UConn*	Pratt & Whitney Stadium at Rentschler Field; East Hartford, CT (rivalry)	CBSSN	L 16–35	32,106	
November 4	7:00 p.m.	Ball State	Warren McGuirk Alumni Stadium; Hadley, MA	ESPNU	W 31–30 ^{OT}	8,881	
November 11	7:30 p.m.	at Toledo	Glass Bowl; Toledo, OH	CBSSN	L 0–24	19,137	
November 18	7:00 p.m.	Akron	Warren McGuirk Alumni Stadium; Hadley, MA	CBSSN	L 33–34	6,698	
November 28	3:30 p.m.	at Bowling Green	Doyt Perry Stadium; Bowling Green, OH	ESPN+			
*Non-conference game; Rankings from AP Poll and CFP Rankings released prior to game; All times are in Eastern time; Source:

== Game summaries ==
=== at Rutgers ===
UMass Minutemen (0–0) at Rutgers Scarlet Knights (0–0) – Game summary

Quarter	1	2	3	4	Total
Minutemen	7	17	3	10	37
Scarlet Knights	7	0	0	14	21

at SHI Stadium • Piscataway, New Jersey

- Date: September 3
- Game time: 6:00 p.m. EDT
- Game weather: Cloudy • Temperature: 86 °F (30 °C) • Wind: W 6 MPH
- Game attendance: 42,454
- Referee: Mark Kluczynski
- TV announcers (BTN): Jason Horowitz, Anthony Herron and Dannie Rogers
- Box score, Recap

Game information
First quarter
- RUTG – KJ Duff 4-yard pass from Dylan Lonergan (Dane Pizzaro kick), 8:20. Scarlet Knights 7–0. Drive: 12 plays, 75 yards, 6:40.
- MASS – Elijah Faulkner 21-yard pass from Pop Watson (Derek Morris kick), 5:26. Tied 7–7. Drive: 7 plays, 75 yards, 2:54.

Second quarter

- MASS – Elijah Faulkner 2-yard pass from Pop Watson (Derek Morris kick), 11:46. Minutemen 14–7. Drive: 13 plays, 68 yards, 7:28.
- MASS – Joseph Griffin Jr. 31-yard pass from Pop Watson (Derek Morris kick), 9:43. Minutemen 21–7. Drive: 2 plays, 36 yards, 0:33.
- MASS – Derek Morris 30-yard field goal, 3:42. Minutemen 24–7. Drive: 8 plays, 51 yards, 4:21.

Third quarter

- MASS – Derek Morris 52-yard field goal, 8:22. Minutemen 27–7. Drive: 10 plays, 41 yards, 6:38.

Fourth quarter

- MASS – Derek Morris 31-yard field goal, 7:54. Minutemen 30–7. Drive: 4 plays, -6 yards, 3:10.
- RUTG – KJ Duff 78-yard pass from Dylan Lonergan (Dane Pizzaro kick), 7:09. Minutemen 30–14. Drive: 4 plays, 75 yards, 0:45.
- MASS – Curtis Kimmons IV 17-yard run (Derek Morris kick), 4:27. Minutemen 37–14. Drive: 2 plays, 22 yards, 0:08.
- RUTG – KJ Duff 6-yard pass from AJ Surace (Dane Pizzaro kick), 1:57. Minutemen 37–21. Drive: 11 plays, 75 yards, 2:30.

Statistics	MASS	RUTG
First downs	21	18
Plays–yards	63–397	63–349
Rushes–yards	41–200	25–30
Passing yards	197	319
Passing: Comp–Att–Int	19–22–0	22–38–3
Turnovers	0	4
Time of possession	36:21	23:39

Team	Category	Player	Statistics
UMass	Passing	Pop Watson	19/22, 197 yards, 3 TD
UMass	Rushing	Curtis Kimmons IV	11 carries, 78 yards, TD
UMass	Receiving	Joseph Griffin Jr.	2 receptions, 61 yards, TD
Rutgers	Passing	Dylan Lonergan	16/29, 242 yards, 2 TD, 3 INT
Rutgers	Rushing	Antwan Raymond	14 carries, 42 yards
Rutgers	Receiving	KJ Duff	9 receptions, 196 yards, 3 TD

=== Sacred Heart (FCS) ===
Sacred Heart Pioneers (FCS) (0–1) at UMass Minutemen (1–0) – Game summary

Quarter	1	2	3	4	Total
Pioneers (FCS)	0	0	3	7	10
Minutemen	17	6	14	0	37

at Warren McGuirk Alumni Stadium • Hadley, Massachusetts

- Date: September 12
- Game time: 3:30 p.m. EDT
- Game weather: Cloudy • Temperature: 76 °F (24 °C) • Wind: S 8 MPH
- Game attendance: 14,895
- Referee: Andrew Speciale
- TV announcers (ESPN+): Joey Lindstrom and Tre Watson
- Box score, Recap

Game information
First quarter
- MASS – T. Y. Harding 49-yard pass from Pop Watson (Derek Morris kick), 14:16. Minutemen 7–0. Drive: 2 plays, 75 yards, 0:40.
- MASS – T. Y. Harding 82-yard punt return (Derek Morris kick), 11:44. Minutemen 14–0.
- MASS – Derek Morris 33-yard field goal, 1:40. Minutemen 17–0. Drive: 15 plays, 83 yards, 8:18.

Second quarter

- MASS – Pop Watson 8-yard run (kick failed), 0:21. Minutemen 23–0. Drive: 4 plays, 71 yards, 1:28.

Third quarter

- MASS – Reece Adkins 1-yard run (Derek Morris kick), 11:51. Minutemen 30–0. Drive: 4 plays, 8 yards, 1:47.
- MASS – Jahmad Harmon 34-yard interception return (Derek Morris kick), 10:23. Minutemen 37–0.
- SHU – Ryan Bocklet 35-yard field goal, 5:29. Minutemen 37–3. Drive: 10 plays, 58 yards, 4:54.

Fourth quarter

- SHU – Cole Snider 1-yard run (Ryan Bocklet kick), 3:32. Minutemen 37–10. Drive: 15 plays, 75 yards, 8:10.

Statistics	SHU	MASS
First downs	16	11
Plays–yards	67–303	40–315
Rushes–yards	42–143	26–152
Passing yards	160	163
Passing: Comp–Att–Int	17–25–1	11–14–0
Turnovers	1	0
Time of possession	35:01	24:59

Team	Category	Player	Statistics
Sacred Heart	Passing	Poochie Snyder	11/16, 77 yards, INT
Sacred Heart	Rushing	Nicholas Yanchuk	6 carries, 28 yards
Sacred Heart	Receiving	Jason Palmieri	5 receptions, 46 yards
UMass	Passing	Pop Watson	9/10, 152 yards, TD
UMass	Rushing	Elijah Faulkner	11 carries, 72 yards
UMass	Receiving	Joseph Griffin Jr.	3 receptions, 59 yards

=== Stonehill (FCS) ===
Stonehill Skyhawks (FCS) (1–2) at UMass Minutemen (2–0) – Game summary

Quarter	1	2	3	4	Total
Skyhawks (FCS)	7	0	0	7	14
Minutemen	13	0	9	14	36

at Warren McGuirk Alumni Stadium • Hadley, Massachusetts

- Date: September 19
- Game time: 3:30 p.m. EDT
- Game weather: Sunny • Temperature: 69 °F (21 °C) • Wind: NW 2 MPH
- Game attendance: 12,233
- Referee: Marcel Kerr
- TV announcers (ESPN+): Shawn Kenney and Charlie Strong
- Box score, Recap

Game information
First quarter
- MASS – Derek Morris 30-yard field goal, 12:09. Minutemen 3–0. Drive: 4 plays, 5 yards, 1:58.
- STO – Alijah Turner 13-yard pass from Jack O'Connell (Langdon Laws kick), 9:15. Skyhawks 7–3. Drive: 6 plays, 75 yards, 2:54.
- MASS – T. Y. Harding 56-yard run (Derek Morris kick), 7:33. Minutemen 10–7. Drive: 5 plays, 72 yards, 1:33.
- MASS – Derek Morris 55-yard field goal, 1:38. Minutemen 13–7. Drive: 6 plays, 29 yards, 3:50.

Second quarter

- No scoring plays

Third quarter

- MASS – Curtis Kimmons IV 1-yard run (pass failed), 9:31. Minutemen 19–7. Drive: 10 plays, 59 yards, 5:26.
- MASS – Derek Morris 33-yard field goal, 2:15. Minutemen 22–7. Drive: 7 plays, 17 yards, 3:04.

Fourth quarter

- MASS – William Watson III 1-yard run (Derek Morris kick), 13:37. Minutemen 29–7. Drive: 5 plays, 40 yards, 2:21.
- MASS – T. Y. Harding 51-yard pass from Pop Watson (Derek Morris kick), 10:54. Minutemen 36–7. Drive: 3 plays, 66 yards, 1:37.
- STO – Derek Varley 2-yard pass from Drew Eason (Langdon Laws kick), 3:32. Minutemen 36–14. Drive: 15 plays, 75 yards, 7:22.

Statistics	STO	MASS
First downs	10	15
Plays–yards	59–161	60–355
Rushes–yards	28–27	35–195
Passing yards	134	160
Passing: Comp–Att–Int	16–31–1	15–25–1
Turnovers	3	1
Time of possession	29:52	30:08

Team	Category	Player	Statistics
Stonehill	Passing	Jack O'Connell	10/21, 69 yards, TD, INT
Stonehill	Rushing	Shane Eason	9 carries, 20 yards
Stonehill	Receiving	Shawn Corchado	3 receptions, 41 yards
UMass	Passing	Pop Watson	15/25, 160 yards, TD, INT
UMass	Rushing	Elijah Faulkner	11 carries, 69 yards
UMass	Receiving	T. Y. Harding	4 receptions, 73 yards, TD

=== at Sacramento State ===
UMass Minutemen (3–0) at Sacramento State Hornets (1–3) – Game summary

Quarter	1	2	3	4	Total
Minutemen	7	14	14	0	35
Hornets	0	6	0	0	6

at Hornet Stadium • Sacramento, California

- Date: September 26
- Game time: 9:00 p.m. EDT / 6:00 p.m. PDT
- Game weather: Sunny • Temperature: 80 °F (27 °C) • Wind: SW 4 MPH
- Game attendance: 11,007
- Referee: Billy Williams
- TV announcers (ESPN+): Will Iger and Mo Hasan
- Box score, Recap

Game information
First quarter
- MASS – Pop Watson 13-yard run (Derek Morris kick), 11:48. Minutemen 7–0. Drive: 6 plays, 75 yards, 3:12.

Second quarter

- SAC – Grant Meadors 20-yard field goal, 14:48. Minutemen 7–3. Drive: 16 plays, 76 yards, 7:23.
- MASS – Pop Watson 32-yard run (Derek Morris kick), 10:27. Minutemen 14–3. Drive: 8 plays, 75 yards, 4:21.
- SAC – Grant Meadors 29-yard field goal, 3:46. Minutemen 14–6. Drive: 4 plays, 2 yards, 0:55.
- MASS – Max Dowling 7-yard pass from Pop Watson (Derek Morris kick), 1:45. Minutemen 21–6. Drive: 6 plays, 75 yards, 2:01.

Third quarter

- MASS – Timmy Hinspeter 49-yard interception return (Derek Morris kick), 13:31. Minutemen 28–6.

Fourth quarter

- MASS – Kezion Dia-Johnson 3-yard run (Derek Morris kick), 2:27. Minutemen 35–6. Drive: 8 plays, 43 yards, 4:25.

Statistics	MASS	SAC
First downs	16	23
Plays–yards	53–333	77–323
Rushes–yards	37–232	34–102
Passing yards	101	221
Passing: Comp–Att–Int	11–16–0	24–43–1
Turnovers	0	3
Time of possession	28:08	31:52

Team	Category	Player	Statistics
UMass	Passing	Pop Watson	11/16, 101 yards, TD
UMass	Rushing	Pop Watson	7 carries, 72 yards, 2 TD
UMass	Receiving	T. Y. Harding	3 receptions, 44 yards
Sacramento State	Passing	Jackson Sharman	24/43, 221 yards, INT
Sacramento State	Rushing	Daniel Swinney	9 carries, 35 yards
Sacramento State	Receiving	Raiden Brown	6 receptions, 61 yards

=== Eastern Michigan ===
Eastern Michigan Eagles (2–3) at UMass Minutemen (4–0) – Game summary

Quarter	1	2	3	4	Total
Eagles	7	7	14	10	38
Minutemen	0	7	0	7	14

at Warren McGuirk Alumni Stadium • Hadley, Massachusetts

- Date: October 3
- Game time: 3:30 p.m. EDT
- Game attendance: 17,119
- TV: ESPN+
- Box score, Recap

Statistics	EMU	MASS
First downs		
Total yards		
Rushing yards		
Passing yards		
Passing: Comp–Att–Int		
Turnovers		
Time of possession		

Team	Category	Player	Statistics
Eastern Michigan	Passing		
Eastern Michigan	Rushing		
Eastern Michigan	Receiving		
UMass	Passing		
UMass	Rushing		
UMass	Receiving		

=== Miami (OH) ===
Miami RedHawks (2–3) at UMass Minutemen (4–1) – Game summary

Quarter	1	2	3	4	Total
RedHawks	14	0	3	3	20
Minutemen	7	3	0	9	19

at Warren McGuirk Alumni Stadium • Hadley, Massachusetts

- Date: October 10
- Game time: 2:00 p.m. EDT
- Game attendance: 13,887
- TV: ESPN+
- Box score, Recap

Statistics	M-OH	MASS
First downs		
Total yards		
Rushing yards		
Passing yards		
Passing: Comp–Att–Int		
Turnovers		
Time of possession		

Team	Category	Player	Statistics
Miami (OH)	Passing		
Miami (OH)	Rushing		
Miami (OH)	Receiving		
UMass	Passing		
UMass	Rushing		
UMass	Receiving		

=== at Buffalo ===
UMass Minutemen (4–2) at Buffalo Bulls (3–3) – Game summary

Quarter	1	2	3	4	OT	Total
Minutemen	7	8	0	3	0	18
Bulls	3	5	7	3	7	25

at Broadview Stadium • Amherst, New York

- Date: October 17
- Game time: 1:00 p.m. EDT
- Game attendance: 6,037
- TV: ESPN+
- Box score, Recap

Statistics	MASS	BUFF
First downs		
Total yards		
Rushing yards		
Passing yards		
Passing: Comp–Att–Int		
Turnovers		
Time of possession		

Team	Category	Player	Statistics
UMass	Passing		
UMass	Rushing		
UMass	Receiving		
Buffalo	Passing		
Buffalo	Rushing		
Buffalo	Receiving		

=== at UConn (rivalry) ===
UMass Minutemen (4–3) at UConn Huskies (3–3) – Game summary

Quarter	1	2	3	4	Total
Minutemen	3	0	0	13	16
Huskies	7	14	7	7	35

at Pratt & Whitney Stadium at Rentschler Field • East Hartford, Connecticut

- Date: October 23
- Game time: 7:00 p.m. EDT
- Game weather: Clear • Temperature: 50 °F (10 °C) • Wind: N at 4 miles per hour (6.4 km/h)
- Game attendance: 32,106
- Referee: Nolan Dumas
- TV announcers (CBSSN): Jack Gordon, Taylor McHargue & Hailey Sutton
- Box score, Recap

Game information

First quarter

- MASS - Morris, Derek 24 yd field goal, 7:03. Minutemen 3–0. Drive: 13 plays, 69 yards, TOP 07:57
- CONN - Porter, Shamar 5 yd pass from Osborne, Kalieb (O'Connor, Jack kick), 1:13. Huskies 7–3. Drive: 13 plays, 75 yards, TOP 05:50

Second quarter

- CONN - Willoughby, JD 20 yd pass from Osborne, Kalieb (O'Connor, Jack kick), 1:36. Huskies 14–3. Drive: 4 plays, 45 yards, TOP 01:07
- CONN - Bowers, Cyncir 70 yd run (O'Connor, Jack kick), 1:04. Huskies 21–3. Drive: 1 plays, 70 yards, TOP 00:12

Third quarter

- CONN - Porter, Shamar 0 yd punt return (O'Connor, Jack kick), 6:44. Huskies 28–3. Drive: 1 play, 0 yards

Fourth quarter

- MASS - Kimmons IV, Curtis 7 yd pass from Watson III, William (Pass no good), 14:17. Huskies 28–9. Drive: 6 plays, 71 yards, TOP 02:41
- CONN - Osborne, Kalieb 13 yd run (O'Connor, Jack kick), 3:04. Huskies 35–9. Drive: 9 plays, 41 yards, TOP 05:05
- MASS - Williams-Thomas, Justin 6 yd run (Morris, Derek kick), 1:09. Huskies 35–16. Drive: 9 plays, 57 yards, TOP 01:48

Statistics	MASS	CONN
First downs	14	21
Plays–yards	66–303	65–438
Rushes–yards	22–53	46–265
Passing yards	250	173
Passing: Comp–Att–Int	26–44–0	14–19–0
Turnovers	0	0
Time of possession	25:45	34:15

Team	Category	Player	Statistics
UMass	Passing	William Watson III	22/38, 205 yards, TD
UMass	Rushing	Elijah Faulkner	6 carries, 15 yards
UMass	Receiving	Joseph Griffin Jr.	4 receptions, 77 yards
UConn	Passing	Kalieb Osborne	14/19, 173 yards, 2 TD
UConn	Rushing	Cyncir Bowers	15 carries, 131 yards, TD
UConn	Receiving	JD Willoughby	3 receptions, 65 yards, TD

=== Ball State ===
Ball State Cardinals (3–5) at UMass Minutemen (4–4) – Game summary

Quarter	1	2	3	4	Total
Cardinals	0	0	0	0	0
Minutemen	0	0	0	0	0

at Warren McGuirk Alumni Stadium • Hadley, Massachusetts

- Date: November 4
- Game time: 7:00 P.M.
- TV announcers (ESPNU): Matt Schick play by play and Craig Haubert analyst

Statistics	BALL	MASS
First downs		
Total yards		
Rushing yards		
Passing yards		
Passing: Comp–Att–Int		
Turnovers		
Time of possession		

Team	Category	Player	Statistics
Ball State	Passing		
Ball State	Rushing		
Ball State	Receiving		
UMass	Passing		
UMass	Rushing		
UMass	Receiving		

=== at Toledo ===
UMass Minutemen (5–4) at Toledo Rockets (7–2) – Game summary

Quarter	1	2	3	4	Total
Minutemen	0	0	0	0	0
Rockets	0	0	0	0	0

at Glass Bowl • Toledo, Ohio

- Date: November 11

Statistics	MASS	TOL
First downs		
Total yards		
Rushing yards		
Passing yards		
Passing: Comp–Att–Int		
Turnovers		
Time of possession		

Team	Category	Player	Statistics
UMass	Passing		
UMass	Rushing		
UMass	Receiving		
Toledo	Passing		
Toledo	Rushing		
Toledo	Receiving		

=== Akron ===
Akron Zips (1–9) at UMass Minutemen (5–5) – Game summary

Quarter	1	2	3	4	Total
Zips	0	0	0	0	0
Minutemen	0	0	0	0	0

at Warren McGuirk Alumni Stadium • Hadley, Massachusetts

- Date: November 18

Statistics	AKR	MASS
First downs		
Total yards		
Rushing yards		
Passing yards		
Passing: Comp–Att–Int		
Turnovers		
Time of possession		

Team	Category	Player	Statistics
Akron	Passing		
Akron	Rushing		
Akron	Receiving		
UMass	Passing		
UMass	Rushing		
UMass	Receiving		

=== at Bowling Green ===
UMass Minutemen (5–6) at Bowling Green Falcons (0–0) – Game summary

Quarter	1	2	3	4	Total
Minutemen	0	0	0	0	0
Falcons	0	0	0	0	0

at Doyt Perry Stadium • Bowling Green, Ohio

- Date: November 28
- Game time: 12:00 p.m. EDT

Statistics	MASS	BGSU
First downs		
Total yards		
Rushing yards		
Passing yards		
Passing: Comp–Att–Int		
Turnovers		
Time of possession		

Team	Category	Player	Statistics
UMass	Passing		
UMass	Rushing		
UMass	Receiving		
Bowling Green	Passing		
Bowling Green	Rushing		
Bowling Green	Receiving		

== Personnel ==
=== Coaching staff ===
Name	Position	Seasons at UMass	Alma mater
Joe Harasymiak	Head Coach	2	Springfield College (2007)
Max Warner	Offensive coordinator/Quarterbacks	1	Millikin University
Jared Keyte	Defensive coordinator	2	Utica University (2012)
Brian White	Offensive line	2	
Jeremy Larkin	Running backs	2	Northwestern (2018)
Jordan Hogan	Wide receivers	2	SUNY Brockport
Matt Layman	Tight Ends	8	Mars Hill University
Nyeem Wartman-White	Defensive line	2	Penn State (2016)
Garrett Gillick	Linebackers	2	UMaine (2000)
Donald Celiscar	Defensive backs	2	WMU (2015)
Joe Castellitto	Special teams coordinator	2	Utica University (2017)
Kevin Coyle	Senior Defensive Assistant Coach	1	
Kayon Whitaker	Assistant Defensive Ends Coach	2	UMaine (2019)
Jake Fire	Assistant Nickels Coach	2	URI (2022)

=== Roster ===
2026 UMass Minutemen football team roster
Players
Coaches
Offense

Pos.	#	Name	Class
RB	0	Jordan Washington	Jr
WR	1	Joseph Griffin Jr.	GS
WR	2	T. Y. Harding	Sr
WR	3	Elijah Pedro	So
RB	4	Da'Marion Alberic	Jr
QB	5	Pop Watson	Sr
RB	6	Justin Williams-Thomas	Sr
QB	7	Will Perry	Jr
WR	8	Kezion Dia-Johnson	Jr
WR	9	Devin Matthews	Sr
QB	10	Ty McCutcheon	Jr
TE	11	Max Dowling	GS
WR	12	David Moore Jr.	Fr
QB	13	Aedan McCarthy	Fr
RB	14	Curtis Kimmons IV	GS
WR	15	Tavian Dashiell	Fr
QB	16	Logan Inagawa	So
WR	17	Dallas Elliott	GS
TE	18	Matt Ogunniyi	Jr
WR	19	Jabari Lewis	Sr
WR	21	Kai Owens	Fr
RB	22	TK Davis	Fr
RB	23	Elijah Faulkner	So
RB	33	Justin Lewis	Fr
OL	35	Magnus Von Saldern	GS
OL	50	Gavin Wilson	So
OL	55	Ben Noome	Fr
OL	57	Garrett Cooper	So
OL	59	Nick Dalessandro	GS
OL	63	Aidan Canty-Whitt	Fr
OL	64	Peyton Miller	Sr
OL	65	Samu Suominen	So
OL	66	Greg Knox III	GS
OL	67	Will McNamara	Fr
OL	69	Brock Taylor	Jr
OL	73	Zachary Franks	GS
OL	74	Jake McGrath	Fr
OL	75	Tanner Burlingame	Jr
OL	76	Riley Bloch	Jr
OL	77	Jaxon King	GS
OL	78	Greg Klingensmith	GS
OL	79	Aitor Urionabarrenechea	Sr
WR	80	Isaiah Simmons	Fr
TE	83	Reece Adkins	GS
WR	85	Drew Alsup	Fr
TE	86	Jax Markovich	So
TE	87	Owen Anderson	GS
TE	88	John Condakes	Jr
TE	89	Matthew Tybor	Fr

Defense

Pos.	#	Name	Class
CB	0	Isaiah Reed	GS
S	1	DD Snyder	GS
DL	2	Joshua Nobles	GS
S	3	Kendall Bournes	Sr
CB	4	Chris Stanley	Jr
LB	5	Tyler Martin	GS
LB	6	Joshua Iseah	Sr
CB	7	TJ Magee	Sr
DL	9	Justin Krueger	Jr
DL	10	Aubrey Melvin	So
DL	11	Jerry Washington	So
CB	12	Corey Warner	Fr
CB	13	Raheim Sexil	Jr
S	14	Jose Touron	Jr
LB	15	Khari Bendolph	So
LB	16	Kendrick Council	Jr
DL	17	Zachary Betts	Jr
LB	18	Dinos Drossos	So
S	19	David Chiavegato	Fr
S	20	Keith Sarkodieh	Jr
CB	21	Terron Johnson	Fr
S	22	Jahmad Harmon	Sr
CB	23	JC Clark	So
S	24	Ted Mondesir	Fr
S	25	Anochie Azuakolam Jr.	So
DL	26	CJ Amobi	Fr
S	27	Michael Pangaro	Jr
CB	28	Ahkir Morgan	Fr
S	29	Kareem Pruitt	Fr
DL	34	Payton Andrade	Sr
LB	36	David Timson	So
S	38	Zeraun Daniel	Sr
LB	40	Mortiz Strempel	Fr
DL	42	Andrew DePaepe	Jr
LB	44	Timmy Hanspeter	GS
DL	55	Zakar Morris	Jr
DL	58	Donovan Murphy	Fr
DL	88	Samuel Mulbah	Fr
DL	90	Tim Passmore Jr.	Sr
DL	92	Romando Johnson	So
DL	94	Colin Reynolds	GS
DL	95	Hollis Dirstine	GS
DL	97	Robert Ekins	Fr
DL	98	William DePaepe	Jr
DL	99	Kamarion Thomas	So

Special teams

Pos.	#	Name	Class
ST	8	Michael Robinson	GS
K	33	Seamus McIntyre	Fr
P	43	Edward Phillipson	So
P	46	Michael Streeter	So
LS	51	Grant Mills	Jr
LS	56	James Horton	Jr
K	99	Derek Morris	Jr

Head coach

- Joe Harasymiak (2nd season)

Coordinators/assistant coaches

- Max Warner (offensive coordinator)
- Jared Keyte (defensive coordinator)
- Joe Castellitto (special teams coordinator)
- Donald Celiscar (cornerbacks)
- Garrett Gillick (linebackers)
- Jordan Hogan (wide receivers/passing game)
- Jeremy Larkin (running backs)
- Matt Layman (tight ends)
- Brian White (offensive line)
- Nyeem Wartman (defensive line)

Legend

- (C) Team captain
- (S) Suspended
- (I) Ineligible
- Injured
- Redshirt

Roster
Last update: September 26, 2026

=== Depth chart ===
(Source - Ourlads)

Defense

STAR
DD Snyder
Michael Robinson
⋅

FS
Kendall Bournes
Jahmad Harmon
⋅

WILL	MIKE
Timmy Hinspeter	Tyler Martin
Khari Bendolph	Joshua Iseah
⋅	⋅

SS
Zeraun Daniel
David Chiavegato
⋅

CB
TJ Magee
Raheim Sexil
⋅

DE	DT	DT	DE
Andrew Depaepe	Tim Passmore Jr.	Zakar Morris	William Depaepe
Justin Krueger	Aubrey Melvin	Joshua Nobles	Romando Johnson
⋅	⋅	⋅	⋅

CB
Isaiah Reed
Chris Stanley
⋅

Offense

WR (H)
Joseph Griffin Jr.
Jabari Lewis
⋅

WR (X)
Dallas Elliot
Kezion Dia-Johnson
⋅

LT	LG	C	RG	RT
Greg Knox III	Aitor Urionabarrenechea Sr.	Peyton Miller	Brock Taylor	Zachary Franks
Gavin Wilson	Samu Suominen	Riley Bloch	Garrett Cooper	Jaxon King
⋅	⋅	⋅	⋅	⋅

TE
Reece Adkins
Max Dowling
⋅

WR (Y)
T.Y. Harding
Drew Alsup
⋅

QB
Pop Watson
Logan Inagawa
Aedan McCarthy

RB
Elijah Faulkner
Curtis Kimmons IV
⋅

Special teams
PK Derek Morris
PK Seamus Mcintyre
P Edward Phillipson
P Michael Streeter
KR TJ Magee
PR T.Y. Harding
LS Grant Mills
H Edward Phillipson

== Awards and honors ==
=== MAC honors ===
Weekly MAC honors
Honors	Player	Position	Date Awarded (Week)	Ref.
Offensive Player of the Week	Pop Watson	QB	September 7, 2026 (W1)	
Defensive Player of the Week	Jahmad Harmon	S	September 7, 2026 (W1)	
Special Teams Player of the Week	Derek Morris	K	September 7, 2026 (W1)	
Special Teams Player of the Week	T.Y. Harding	KR/PR	September 14, 2026 (W2)	
Coordinator of the Week	Jared Keyte	Def. Cord.	September 14, 2026 (W2)	
Defensive Player of the Week	William Depaepe	DL	September 21, 2026 (W3)	
Special Teams Player of the Week	Derek Morris (2)	K	September 21, 2026 (W3)	

=== National honors ===
Weekly national honors
Honors	Player	Position	Date Awarded	Ref.
Davey O'Brien Award - Great 8	Pop Watson	QB	September 8, 2026	
Pop-Tarts Bowl - Crazy Good Team Of The Week	Team		September 8, 2026	
Dodd Trophy - Coach of the Week	Joe Harsymiak	HC	September 9, 2026	
Lou Groza Award - Star of the Week	Derek Morris	K	September 9, 2026	
Ray Guy Award - Ray's 8	Edward Phillipson	P	September 21, 2026	
