= Casus belli =

Act or event that provokes or is used to justify war

A casus belli (from Latin casus 'occasion' and belli 'for war'; pl. casus belli) is an act or an event that either provokes or is used to justify a war. A casus belli involves direct offenses or threats against the nation declaring the war, whereas a casus foederis involves offenses or threats against its ally—usually one bound by a mutual defense pact. Either may be considered an act of war. A declaration of war usually contains a description of the casus belli that has led the party in question to declare war on another party.

== Terminology ==
The term casus belli came into widespread use in Europe in the seventeenth and eighteenth centuries through the writings of Hugo Grotius (1653), Cornelius van Bynkershoek (1707), and Jean-Jacques Burlamaqui (1732), among others, and due to the rise of the political doctrine of jus ad bellum or "just war theory". The term is also used informally to refer to any "just cause" a nation may claim for entering into a conflict. It is used to describe the case for war given before the term came into wide use, and to describe the rationale for military action even without a formal declaration of war (as in: the lead up to the Gulf of Tonkin Resolution).

In formally articulating a casus belli, a government typically lays out its reasons for going to war, its intended means of prosecuting the war, and the steps that others might take to dissuade it from going to war. It attempts to demonstrate that it is going to war only as a last resort or plan (ultima ratio) and that it has "just cause" for doing so. Modern international law recognizes at least three lawful justifications for waging war: self-defense, defense of an ally required by the terms of a treaty, and approval by the United Nations.

Proschema (plural proschemata) is the equivalent Greek term, first popularized by Thucydides in his History of the Peloponnesian War. The proschemata are the stated reasons for waging war, which may or may not be the same as the real reasons, which Thucydides called prophasis (πρóφασις). Thucydides argued that the three primary real reasons for waging war are reasonable fear, honor, and interest, while the stated reasons involve appeals to nationalism or fearmongering (as opposed to descriptions of reasonable, empirical causes for fear).

== Reasons for use ==
In the post–World War II era, the UN Charter prohibits signatory countries from engaging in war except:

- As a means of defending themselves, or an ally where treaty obligations require it, against aggression.
- When the UN as a body has given prior approval to the operation.

The UN also reserves the right to ask member nations to intervene against non-signatory countries that embark on wars of aggression.

== Categorisation ==
Bear Braumoeller (2019) stated: "However idiosyncratic the casus belli may seem, however, there generally is one ... The issues that prompt most wars fit fairly well into one of a fairly manageable number of categories." He broadly summarised classical issues as territory, the creation or dissolution of countries, the defence of the integrity of countries, dynastic succession, and the defence of co-religionists or co-nationals. He pointed out that in the modern field of peace and conflict studies, scholars also frequently list causes such as "struggle for power, arms races and conflict spirals, ethnicity and nationalism, domestic political regime type and leadership change, economic interdependence and trade, territory, climate change-induced scarcity, and so on".

In The Causes of War (1972), Australian historian Geoffrey Blainey mentioned general causes such as miscalculation, as well as specific causes such as "Death Watch and Scapegoat Wars", and emphasised the importance of mundane factors such as weather.

Theodore K. Rabb and Robert I. Rotberg explored the roots of major conflicts as a mixture of factors on the international, domestic and individual level in The Origin and Prevention of Major Wars (1989).

Kalevi Holsti catalogued and categorised wars from 1648 to 1989 according to 24 categories of "issues that generated wars".

A casus belli intentionally based on inaccurate facts is known as a pretext.

== Historical examples ==
This section outlines a number of the more famous and/or controversial cases of casus belli which have occurred in modern times.

=== Second Opium War ===
Europeans had access to Chinese ports as outlined in the Treaty of Nanking from the First Opium War. France used the execution of Auguste Chapdelaine as a casus belli for the Second Opium War. On February 29, 1856, Chapdelaine, a French missionary, was killed in the province of Guangxi, which was not open to foreigners. In response, British and French forces quickly took control of Guangzhou (Canton).

=== American Civil War ===
While long-term conflict between the Northern and Southern States (mainly due to moral questions caused by slavery, as well as socio-economic disparities) was the cause of the American Civil War, the Confederate attack on Fort Sumter (April 12–14, 1861) served as the casus belli for the Union. Historian David Herbert Donald (1996) concluded that President Abraham Lincoln's "repeated efforts to avoid collision in the months between inauguration and the firing on Ft. Sumter showed he adhered to his vow not to be the first to shed fraternal blood. But he also vowed not to surrender the forts. The only resolution of these contradictory positions was for the confederates to fire the first shot; they did just that." Confederate veteran William Watson opined in 1887 that up until that point, U.S. Secretary of State William H. Seward had not been able to find 'a just cause to declare war against the seceded States', but Sumter gave him 'the casus belli he had sought'. Watson lamented how Jefferson Davis and other Confederate leaders were 'vainglorious[ly]' celebrating the victory at Sumter, while forgetting that making the first move had given the Confederacy the immediate internationally negative reputation of being the aggressor, and had granted Seward 'the undivided sympathy of the North'.

=== Spanish–American War ===
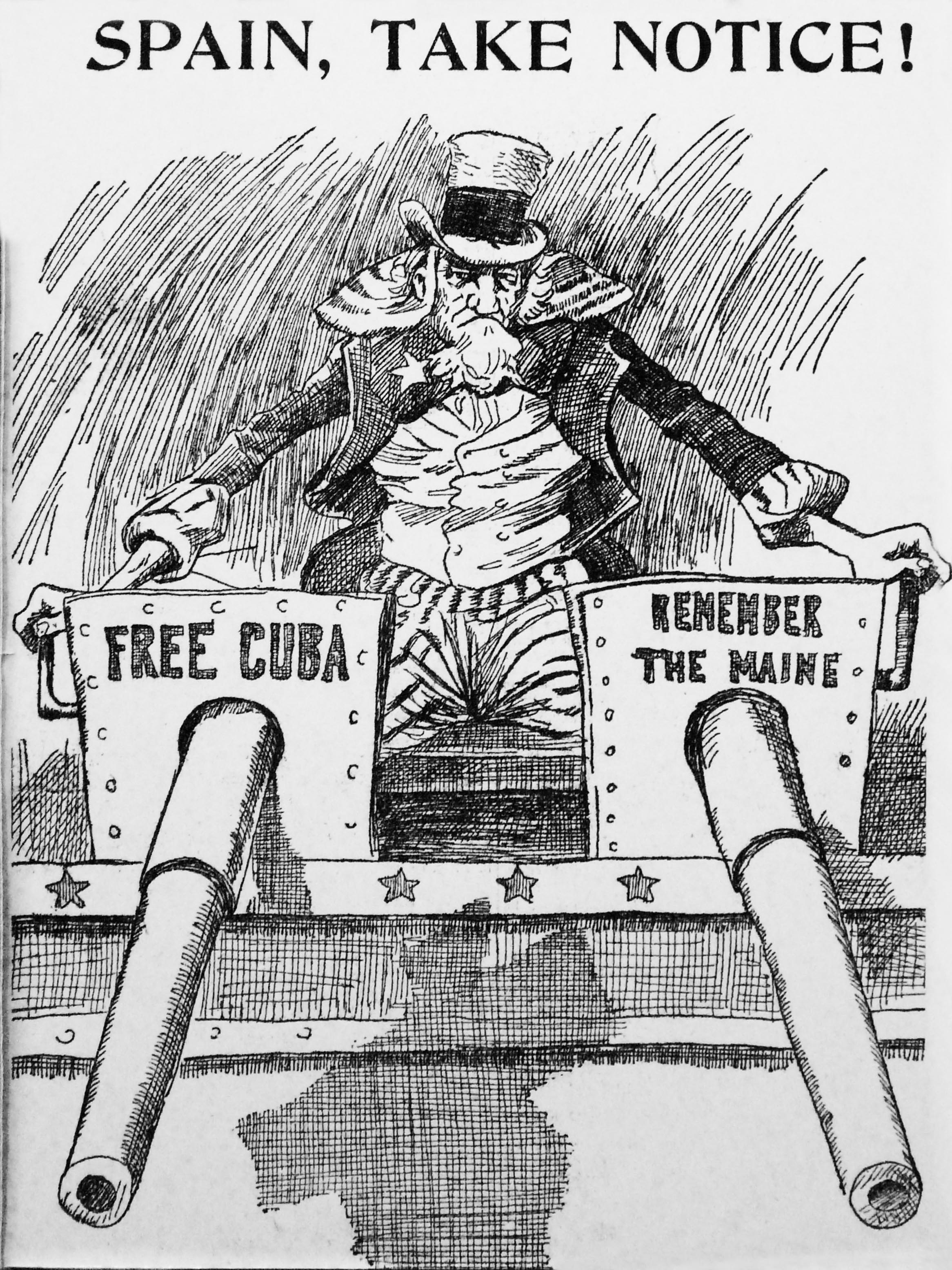
Cartoon of belligerent Uncle Sam placing Spain on notice, c. 1898

The Maine was a United States Navy ship that sank in Havana Harbor, Spanish Cuba on February 15, 1898. While the destruction of the Maine did not result in an immediate declaration of war with Spain, it did create an atmosphere that precluded a peaceful solution. The Spanish investigation found that the explosion had been caused by spontaneous combustion of the coal bunkers, but the US Sampson Board's Court of Inquiry ruled that the explosion had been caused by an external explosion from a torpedo. The McKinley administration did not cite the explosion as a casus belli, but others were already inclined to go to war with Spain over perceived atrocities and loss of control in Cuba. Advocates of war used the rallying cry, "Remember the Maine! To hell with Spain!"

=== World War I ===
Austria-Hungary's casus belli against Serbia in July 1914 was based upon Serbia's refusal to investigate the involvement of Serbian government officials in the equipping, training and paying the assassins who murdered Archduke Franz Ferdinand of Austria at Sarajevo. The Serbian government refused the Austrian Démarche, and Austria-Hungary declared war.

For Britain, the direct cause of entering the war was the German invasion and occupation of Belgium, violating Belgian neutrality which Britain was bound by treaty to uphold.

For the United States, Congress cited "repeated acts of war" against the government and the people of the United States. The primary reason was unrestricted submarine warfare against the shipping of neutral nations, including the United States. In addition, the German Empire sent the Zimmermann Telegram to Mexico, in which they tried to persuade Mexico to join the war and fight against the United States, for which they would be rewarded Texas, New Mexico, and Arizona, all former Mexican territories. This telegram was intercepted by the British, then relayed to the U.S., which led to President Woodrow Wilson then using it to convince Congress to join World War I alongside the Allies. The Mexican president at the time, Venustiano Carranza, had a military commission assess the feasibility, which concluded that this would not be feasible for a number of reasons.

=== World War II ===
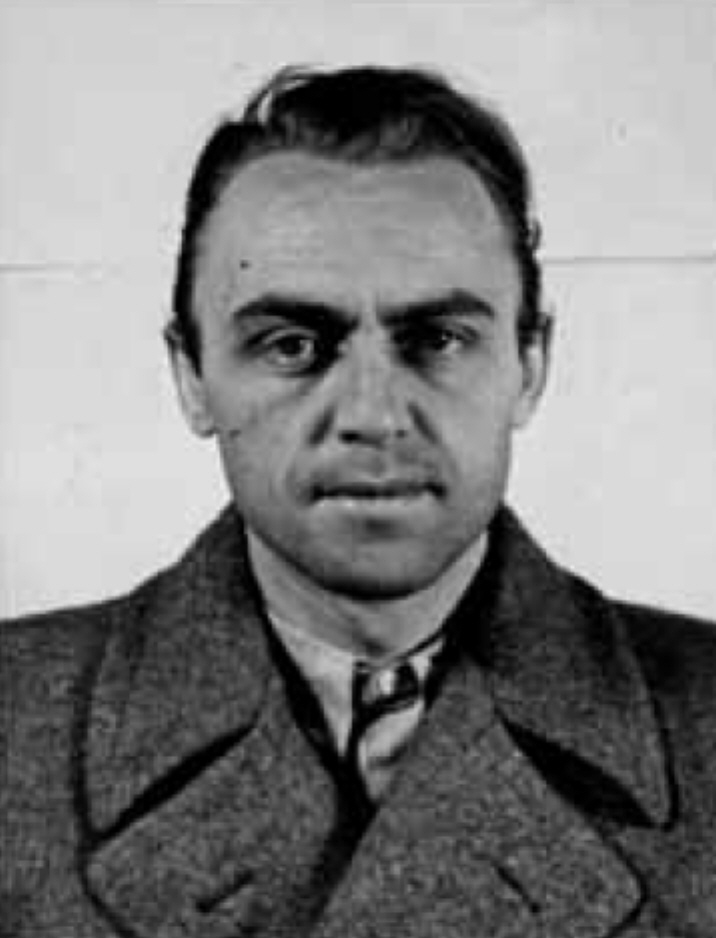
Alfred Naujocks, who organized and led the Gleiwitz incident on the orders of Reinhard Heydrich

In Manchukuo, the Empire of Japan staged the Marco Polo Bridge incident in 1937 as a casus belli to initiate the Second Sino-Japanese War, often considered to be the start of the Pacific Theatre of the Second World War.

In his autobiography Mein Kampf, Adolf Hitler had in the 1920s advocated a policy of Lebensraum ("living space") for the German people, which in practical terms meant German territorial expansion into Eastern Europe. In August 1939, to implement the first phase of this policy, Nazi Germany's government under Hitler's leadership staged the Gleiwitz incident, which was used as a casus belli for the invasion of Poland the following September. Nazi forces used concentration camp prisoners posing as Poles on 31 August 1939, to attack the German radio station Sender Gleiwitz in Gleiwitz, Upper Silesia, Germany (now Gliwice, Poland) on the eve of World War II. Poland's allies, the United Kingdom and France, subsequently declared war on Germany in accordance with their alliance. The United States would declare war on Japan after the attack on Pearl Harbor on December 7, 1941.

In 1941, acting once again in accordance with the policy of Lebensraum, Nazi Germany invaded the Soviet Union, using the casus belli of preemptive war to justify the act of aggression.

=== Vietnam War ===
Many historians have suggested that the Second Gulf of Tonkin incident was a manufactured pretext for the Vietnam War. North Vietnamese Naval officials have publicly stated that during the second incident the USS Maddox was never fired on by North Vietnamese naval forces. In the documentary film The Fog of War, then-US Defense Secretary Robert McNamara concedes the attack during the second incident did not happen, though he says that he and President Johnson believed it did so at the time.

The first Gulf of Tonkin Incident (2 August) should not be confused with the second Gulf of Tonkin Incident (4 August). The North Vietnamese claimed that on 2 August, US destroyer USS Maddox was hit by one torpedo and that one of the American aircraft had been shot down in North Vietnamese territorial waters. The PAVN Museum in Hanoi displays "Part of a torpedo boat ... which successfully chased away the USS Maddox August 2nd, 1964".

The casus belli for the Vietnam War was the second incident. On 4 August, USS Maddox was launched to the North Vietnamese coast to "show the flag" after the first incident. The US authorities claimed that two Vietnamese boats tried to attack USS Maddox and were sunk. The government of North Vietnam denied the second incident completely.

=== 1967 Arab-Israeli War ===
A casus belli played a prominent role during the Six-Day War of 1967. The Israeli government had a short list of casūs belli, acts that it would consider provocations justifying armed retaliation. The most important was a blockade of the Straits of Tiran leading into Eilat, Israel's only port to the Red Sea, through which Israel received much of its oil. After several border incidents between Israel and Egypt's allies Syria and Jordan, Egypt expelled UNEF peacekeepers from the Sinai Peninsula, established a military presence at Sharm el-Sheikh, and announced a blockade of the straits, prompting Israel to cite its casus belli in opening hostilities against Egypt.

=== China-Vietnam War ===
During the 1979 Sino-Vietnamese War, China's leader Deng Xiaoping told the United States that its plan to fight the Vietnamese was revenge for Vietnam's toppling of the Khmer Rouge regime of Cambodia, an ally of China. However Chinese nationalists have argued that the real casus belli was Vietnam's poor treatment of its ethnic Chinese population, as well as suspicion of Vietnam trying to consolidate Cambodia with Soviet backing.

=== 2003 United States invasion of Iraq ===
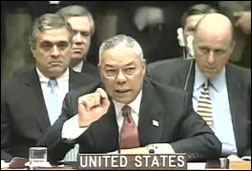
February 5, 2003 – U.S. Secretary of State Colin Powell holding a model vial of anthrax while giving the presentation to the UN Security Council

When the United States invaded Iraq in 2003, it cited Iraq's non-compliance with the terms of cease-fire agreement for the 1990–1991 Gulf War, as well as planning in the 1993 attempted assassination of former president George H. W. Bush and firing on coalition aircraft enforcing the no-fly zones as its stated casus belli.

Cited by the George W. Bush administration was Saddam Hussein's weapons of mass destruction (WMD) program and his connections to al-Qaeda after the September 11 attacks in 2001. The administration claimed that Iraq had not conformed with its obligation to disarm under past UN Resolutions, and that Saddam Hussein was actively attempting to acquire a nuclear weapons capability as well as enhance an existing arsenal of chemical and biological weapons. Secretary of State Colin Powell addressed a plenary session of the United Nations Security Council on February 5, 2003, citing these reasons as justification for military action. Since-declassified National Intelligence Estimates (NIE's) indicate that any certainty may have been overstated in justification of armed intervention; the extent, origin and intent of these overstatements cannot be conclusively determined from the NIE.

=== Russia-Ukraine War ===
==== Annexation of Crimea ====
After the annexation of Crimea by the Russian Federation in 2014, Russian President Vladimir Putin argued that Crimea and other regions "were not part of Ukraine" after it was taken in the 18th century. The ethnic Russian population in Crimea and eastern Ukraine has been seen as a casus belli for Russia's annexation. The Foreign Ministry claimed that Ukraine tried to seize Crimean government buildings, citing this as a casus belli.

==== 2022 Russian Invasion of Ukraine ====
Prior to the 2022 Russian invasion of Ukraine, Russia recognized the separatist republics in Donetsk and Luhansk, and the alliance between them was ratified in their parliaments, thus creating a usable casus belli. Russia also claimed a genocide was being committed against Russian speakers in Ukraine by neo-Nazi groups and that the Ukrainian government were neo-Nazis. A false-flag operation was also considered by Russia, according to US, UK, and Ukrainian intelligence.

== See also ==
- Casus foederis
- False flag
- Jus ad bellum
- List of Latin phrases
- Status quo
- War aims of the First World War

== Literature ==
- Braumoeller, Bear F. (2019). Only the Dead: The Persistence of War in the Modern Age. Oxford: Oxford University Press. p. 288. ISBN 9780190849542.
- Donald, David Herbert (5 November 1996). Lincoln. Simon & Schuster. ISBN 978-0-684-82535-9.
- Holsti, Kalevi (1991). Peace and War: Armed Conflicts and International Order, 1648–1989. Cambridge: Cambridge University Press. p. 379. ISBN 9780521399296.
- Slater S.J., Thomas (1925). "Book 6: On War" . A manual of moral theology for English-speaking countries. Burns Oates & Washbourne Ltd.
