= 2025 UMass Minutemen football team =

American college football season

2025 UMass Minutemen football
- Conference: Mid-American Conference
- Record: 0–12 (0–8 MAC)
- Head coach: Joe Harasymiak (1st season)
- Offensive coordinator: Mike Bajakian (1st season)
- Offensive scheme: Spread
- Defensive coordinator: Jared Keyte (1st season)
- Base defense: Multiple 4–2–5
- Home stadium: Warren McGuirk Alumni Stadium

Uniform
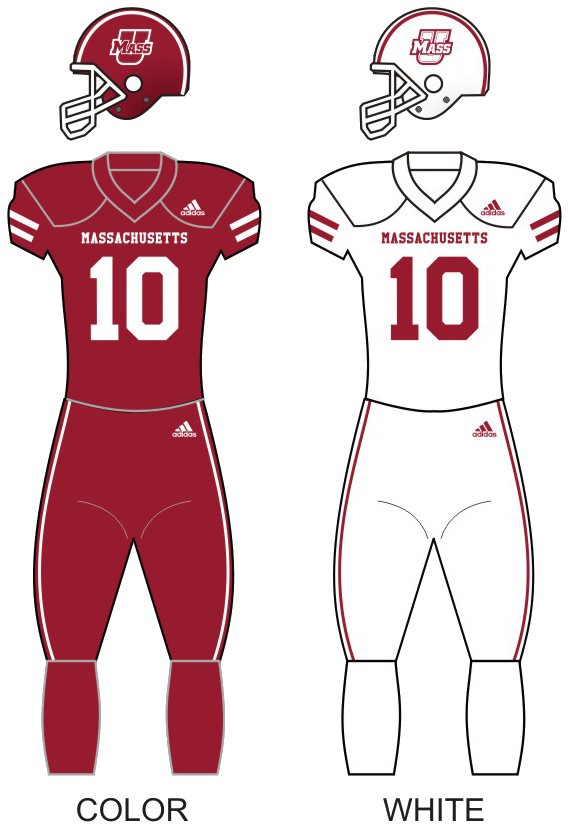

2025 Mid-American Conference football standings
	Conf.			Overall
Team	W		L	W		L
Western Michigan y$	7	–	1	10	–	4
Miami (OH) y	6	–	2	7	–	7
Ohio	6	–	2	9	–	4
Toledo	6	–	2	8	–	5
Central Michigan	5	–	3	7	–	6
Akron*	4	–	4	5	–	7
Buffalo	4	–	4	5	–	7
Kent State	4	–	4	5	–	7
Eastern Michigan	3	–	5	4	–	8
Ball State	3	–	5	4	–	8
Bowling Green	2	–	6	4	–	8
Northern Illinois	2	–	6	3	–	9
UMass	0	–	8	0	–	12
Championship: Western Michigan 23, Miami (OH) 13
$ – Conference champion; y – Championship game participant; * Ineligible for postseason play due to low APR score

The 2025 UMass Minutemen football team represented the University of Massachusetts Amherst during the 2025 NCAA Division I FBS football season. They played their home games at Warren McGuirk Alumni Stadium located in Hadley, Massachusetts, and competed as a member of the Mid-American Conference (MAC). They were led by first-year head coach Joe Harasymiak.

They failed to improve upon their 2–10 record from last season and instead continued their 16-game losing streak en route to suffering their first full winless campaign, becoming the 8th team in the MAC since 2009 to do so, as well as the second straight after Kent State did so the previous year. Some lowlights of the season included a 27–26 loss to FCS Bryant on a game-winning field goal in Week 2, a 47–7 blowout loss to the Iowa Hawkeyes in Week 3, and a Week 7 loss to the Buffalo Bulls by a score of 28–21 after holding a 1 point lead in the final minute prior to the touchdown.

== Offseason ==
Positions key
Offense	Defense	Special teams
QB — Quarterback; RB — Running back; FB — Fullback; WR — Wide receiver; TE — Tight end; OL — Offensive lineman; T — Tackle; G — Guard; C — Center	DL — Defensive lineman; DT — Defensive tackle (Note: Includes nose tackle (NT)); DE — Defensive end; EDGE — Edge rusher; LB — Linebacker (Note: Includes middle linebacker (MLB/MIKE), weakside linebacker (WILL), strongside linebacker (SAM), off-ball linebacker, and outside linebacker (OLB)); DB — Defensive back; CB — Cornerback; S — Safety (Note: Includes free safety (FS) and strong safety (SS))	K — Kicker (Note: Also known as a placekicker (PK)); P — Punter; LS — Long snapper; RS — Return specialist (Note: Includes kickoff and punt returners)

=== Team departures ===
2024 UMass graduates
Name	Position	Notes
Jakobie Keeney-James	WR	Graduated/Declared for 2025 NFL draft
Arsheen Jiles	DB	Graduated/Declared for 2025 NFL draft
Jaelyn Lay	TE	Graduated/Declared for 2025 NFL draft
Dominick Mazotti	TE	Graduated/Declared for 2025 NFL draft
Te'Rai Powell	DB	Graduated/Declared for 2025 NFL draft
Jashon Watkins	DB	Graduated/Returning to UMass.
Kamren Watkins-Hunter	DB	Graduated/Returning to UMass.
Riley Moore	K	Graduated/Transferred to
Matt Smith	TE	Graduated/Transferred to URI
Jalen Stewart	LB	Graduated/Transferred to
Josh Atwood	OL	Graduated
Macklin Ayers	LB	Graduated
John Burton	LB	Graduated
Lake Ellis	DB	Graduated
Sterling Galban	WR	Graduated
Tim Grant-Randall	DL	Graduated
Leonard St. Gourdin	DB	Graduated
Alessandro Houghton	OL	Graduated
Jaylen Hudson	DL	Graduated
Zukudo Igwenagu	DL	Graduated
Gerrell Johnson	LB	Graduated
CJ Kolodziey	K/P	Graduated
Frank Ladson Jr.	WR	Graduated
Jacob Lurie	K	Graduated
Jackson Marx	LS	Graduated
Ethan Mottinger	OL	Graduated
Luke Painton	OL	Graduated
Taisun Phommachanh	QB	Graduated
Etinosa Reuben	DL	Graduated
Brayden Rohme	OL	Graduated
Tyler Rudolph	DB	Graduated
Isaiah Rutherford	DB	Graduated
Myles Turner	LB	Graduated/transferred to Towson

=== Transfer portal ===
14 Massachusetts players elected to enter the NCAA Transfer Portal during or after the 2024 season.

Departing transfers
Name	No.	Pos.	Height/weight	Hometown	New school
Jalen John	#21	RB	5'11", 220	Portland, OR	Coastal Carolina
Aaron Beckwith	#44	DT	6'4", 300	Germantown, MD	Temple
Tyson Watson	#55	DL	6'5", 290	Warren, MI	Campbell
Matt Smith	#80	TE	6'5", 245	Needham, MA	Rhode Island
Anthony Simpson	#8	WR	5'11", 180	Hartford, CT	Michigan
Ahmad Haston	#5	QB	6'0", 200	Palm Beach, FL	Tennessee Tech
Ott Eric Ottender	#83	WR	5'11", 185	Tallinn, Estonia	
Kofi Asare	#94	DE	6'5", 250	Worcester, MA	Florida
Jyree Roberts	#36	LB	6'1", 230	Erie, PA	RMU
Donta Whack	#25	RB	5'11", 205	Sanford, FL	Robert Morris
Riley Moore	#98	P	5'10", 190	Goodrich, MI	
Louce Julien	#18	DL	6'2", 225	Orange, NJ	Toledo
Jerrod Cameron	#28	DB	5'8", 175	Miami, FL	
Brandon McElroy	#88	DL	6'5", 301	Pasadena, CA	
Sahnai Swain-Price	#53	DL	6'1", 290	Boston, MA	Rhode Island

Incoming transfers
Name	No.	Pos.	Height/weight	Hometown	Prev. school
Reece Adkins	#83	TE	6'6", 250	Lake Mary, FL	UCF
TJ Magee	#5	DB	5'10", 190	Denham Springs, LA	Davidson
Kendall Bournes	#5	DB	6'0", 195	Union, NJ	Concord
Michael Entwistle	#70	OL	6'2", 295	Paramus, NJ	Harvard
Timmy Hinspeter	#44	LB	6'1", 230	Ramsey, NJ	Rutgers
Malachi Madison	#54	DL	6'3", 290	Chester, VA	Virginia Tech
Max Dowling	#87	TE	6'6", 240	Buffalo, NY	UT Martin
Keegan Andrews	#33	P	6'3", 250	Melbourne, Australia	Texas A&M
Marcus Lye	#49	K	6'1", 210	Parkes, Australia	NAU
Shymell Davis	#33	DT	6'2", 295	Woolwich, NJ	Maine
Tyree Kelly	#15	WR	6'3", 208	Cairo, GA	USF
Alex Geraci	#10	TE	6'4", 240	Cornwall-on-Hudson, NY	Dartmouth
Zeraun Daniel	#38	DB	6'2", 205	Brooklyn, NY	Georgetown
Jovoni Borbon	#47	LS	6'0", 190	Sierra Vista, AZ	McNeese State
Joshua Nobles	#2	EDGE	6'4", 250	Camden, NJ	Jackson State
Kyle Brown	#63	OL	6'4", 295	Cairo, GA	Dartmouth
Malcolm Greene	#8	DB	5'10", 208	Richmond, VA	Virginia
Sullivan Weidman	#57	OL	6'5", 318	Brookline, MA	West Virginia
David Onuoha	#35	DE	6'1", 237	Aberdeen, NJ	Rutgers
DD Snyder	#3	CB	6'0", 175	Tampa, FL	Ball State
Nick Hawthorne	#5	EDGE	6'3", 217	Fort Worth, TX	Boise State
Brandon Rose	#8	QB	6'2", 195	Murrieta, CA	Utah
Grant Jordan	#9	QB	6'2", 210	New Orleans, LA	Yale
Dean Shaffer	#52	LB	6'1", 230	Smithtown, NY	Yale
Rocko Griffin	#8	RB	5'9", 200	Rincon, GA	UTSA
Timothy Passmore Jr.	#56	DL	6'2", 295	Cocoa, FL	UConn
Derek Morris	#99	K	6'2", 200	Dayton, OH	California
Jake McConnachie	#84	WR	6'5", 215	Verona, NJ	Pitt
Matthew Ogunniyi	#18	TE	6'5", 236	Springdale, MD	Rutgers

Note: Players with a dash in the new school column have not joined a new team for the 2025 season.

=== 2025 recruiting class ===
College recruiting (2025)
Name	Hometown	School	Height	Weight	Commit date
Jax Markovich; TE	Scottsdale, Arizona	Horizon High School	6 ft 4 in (1.93 m)	220 lb (100 kg)	Jul 2, 2024
Jax Markovich; TE	Recruit ratings: Rivals: 247Sports: On3: ESPN: (73)				
Zachary Lawrence; QB	Matthews, North Carolina	Butler High School	6 ft 0 in (1.83 m)	200 lb (91 kg)	Jun 25, 2024
Zachary Lawrence; QB	Recruit ratings: Rivals: On3: ESPN: (73)				
Anochie Azuakolam; S	Cambridge, Massachusetts	Buckingham Browne & Nichols School	6 ft 2 in (1.88 m)	175 lb (79 kg)	Jun 25, 2024
Anochie Azuakolam; S	Recruit ratings: Rivals: On3: (NR)				
Jahmale Clark; CB	Dayton, Ohio	Trotwood-Madison High School	5 ft 10 in (1.78 m)	140 lb (64 kg)	Jun 27, 2024
Jahmale Clark; CB	Recruit ratings: Rivals: 247Sports: On3: (NR)				
Elijah Faulkner; RB	Pittsburgh, Pennsylvania	Central Catholic High School	5 ft 10 in (1.78 m)	190 lb (86 kg)	Jan 28, 2025
Elijah Faulkner; RB	Recruit ratings: (NR)				
Gavin Wilson; OT	Greenville, South Carolina	Greenville High School	6 ft 6 in (1.98 m)	275 lb (125 kg)	Jan 28, 2025
Gavin Wilson; OT	Recruit ratings: (NR)				
Garrett Cooper; OT	Delmar, Delaware	Delmar High School	6 ft 6 in (1.98 m)	280 lb (130 kg)	Jan 28, 2025
Garrett Cooper; OT	Recruit ratings: (NR)				
Elijah Pedro; ATH	Olney, Maryland	Dr. Henry A. Wise Jr. High School	5 ft 11 in (1.80 m)	165 lb (75 kg)	Jan 28, 2025
Elijah Pedro; ATH	Recruit ratings: Rivals: ESPN: (74)				
Dinos Drossos; LB	Tucson, Arizona	Salpointe Catholic High School	6 ft 3 in (1.91 m)	210 lb (95 kg)	Feb 5, 2025
Dinos Drossos; LB	Recruit ratings: 247Sports:				
Overall recruit ranking:
Note: In many cases, Scout, Rivals, 247Sports, On3, and ESPN may conflict in their listings of height and weight.; In these cases, the average was taken. ESPN grades are on a 100-point scale.; Sources: "2025 Team Ranking". Rivals.com.

== Preseason ==
The MAC Football Kickoff was held on Thursday, July 24, 2025 at the Ford Field in Detroit, Michigan from 9:00 am EDT to 1:30 pm EDT.

=== Preseason polls ===
==== Coaches Poll ====
On July 24 the MAC announced the preseason coaches' poll.

== Schedule ==
Date	Time	Opponent	Site	TV	Result	Attendance
August 30	3:30 p.m.	Temple*	Warren McGuirk Alumni Stadium; Hadley, MA	ESPN+	L 10–42	11,565
September 6	3:30 p.m.	Bryant*	Warren McGuirk Alumni Stadium; Hadley, MA	ESPN+	L 26–27	3,714
September 13	7:30 p.m.	at Iowa*	Kinnick Stadium; Iowa City, IA	BTN	L 7–47	69,250
September 27	7:30 p.m.	at No. 20 Missouri*	Faurot Field; Columbia, MO	ESPNU	L 6–42	57,321
October 4	2:30 p.m.	Western Michigan^{†}	Warren McGuirk Alumni Stadium; Hadley, MA	ESPN+	L 3–21	10,014
October 11	2:30 p.m.	at Kent State	Dix Stadium; Kent, OH	ESPN+	L 6–42	11,523
October 18	2:30 p.m.	Buffalo	Warren McGuirk Alumni Stadium; Hadley, MA	ESPN+	L 21–28	15,242
October 25	3:30 p.m.	at Central Michigan	Kelly/Shorts Stadium; Mount Pleasant, MI	ESPN+	L 13–38	20,489
November 4	7:00 p.m.	at Akron	InfoCision Stadium–Summa Field; Akron, OH	CBSSN	L 10–44	5,046
November 12	7:00 p.m.	Northern Illinois	Warren McGuirk Alumni Stadium; Hadley, MA	ESPNU	L 3–45	6,155
November 18	7:00 p.m.	at Ohio	Peden Stadium; Athens, OH	CBSSN	L 14–42	12,438
November 25	4:30 p.m.	Bowling Green	Warren McGuirk Alumni Stadium; Hadley, MA	ESPNU	L 14–45	6,043
*Non-conference game; ^{†}Homecoming; Rankings from AP Poll and CFP Rankings released prior to game; All times are in Eastern time

== Game summaries ==
=== Temple ===
Game One – Temple Owls (0–0) at UMass Minutemen (0–0) – Game summary

Quarter	1	2	3	4	Total
Owls	7	21	0	14	42
Minutemen	10	0	0	0	10

at Warren McGuirk Alumni Stadium • Amherst, Massachusetts

- Date: August 30
- Game time: 3:30 p.m. EDT
- Game weather: Sunny, 72 °F (22 °C)
- Game attendance: 11,565
- Referee: Matt Packowski
- TV announcers (ESPN+): Robert Lee, Patrick Murray
- Box score, Recap

Game information

First quarter

- MASS – Rocko Griffin 18-yard run (Derek Morris kick), 11:25. Minutemen 7–0. Drive: 9 plays, 75 yards, 3:35.
- TEM – Peter Clarke 21-yard pass from Evan Simon (Carl Hardin kick), 5:02. Tied 7–7. Drive: 12 plays, 90 yards, 6:18.
- MASS – Derek Morris 40-yard field goal, 1:11. Minutemen 10–7. Drive: 9 plays, 53 yards, 3:51.

Second quarter

- TEM – Kajiya Hollawayne 24-yard pass from Evan Simon (Carl Hardin kick), 11:48. Owls 14–10. Drive: 3 plays, 41 yards, 0:40.
- TEM – Peter Clarke 29-yard pass from Evan Simon (Carl Hardin kick), 5:40. Owls 21–10. Drive: 5 plays, 99 yards, 2:08.
- TEM – Terrez Worthy 13-yard pass from Evan Simon (Carl Hardin kick), 0:59. Owls 28–10. Drive: 5 plays, 48 yards, 0:35.

Third quarter

- No scoring plays.

Fourth quarter

- TEM – Ryder Kusch 3-yard pass from Evan Simon (Carl Hardin kick), 12:39. Owls 35–10. Drive: 13 plays, 80 yards, 7:09.
- TEM – Ryder Kusch 2-yard pass from Evan Simon (Carl Hardin kick), 6:26. Owls 42–10. Drive: 8 plays, 35 yards, 3:57.

Statistics	TEM	MASS
First downs	24	18
Plays–yards	65–468	62–302
Rushes–yards	36–192	22–103
Passing yards	276	199
Passing: comp–att–int	22–29–0	25–40–1
Turnovers	0	2
Time of possession	33:46	26:14

Team	Category	Player	Statistics
Temple	Passing	Evan Simon	19/25, 248 yards, 6 TD
Temple	Rushing	Jay Ducker	19 carries, 128 yards
Temple	Receiving	Jojo Bermudez	7 receptions, 87 yards
UMass	Passing	Brandon Rose	23/38, 193 yards, INT
UMass	Rushing	Rocko Griffin	10 carries, 94 yards, TD
UMass	Receiving	Jacquon Gibson	12 receptions, 132 yards

=== Bryant (FCS) ===
Game Two – Bryant Bulldogs (FCS) (0–1) at UMass Minutemen (0–1) – Game summary

Quarter	1	2	3	4	Total
Bulldogs (FCS)	0	10	14	3	27
Minutemen	6	14	3	3	26

at McGuirk Alumni Stadium • Hadley, Massachusetts

- Date: September 6
- Game time: 3:30 p.m. EDT
- Game weather: Cloudy, 81 °F (27 °C)
- Game attendance: 3,714
- Referee: David Hergert
- TV announcers (ESPN+): Cooper Boardman (play-by-play) and Tre Watson (analyst)
- Box score, Recap

Game information

First quarter

- MASS - Brennan Myer pass intercepted Tyler Martin return for 23 yds for a TD (Derek Morris PAT MISSED), 4:04, Minutemen 6–0.

Second quarter

- MASS – Brandon Hood 13-yard run, 13:06. Minutemen 13–0. Drive: 8 plays, 61 yards, 4:30.
- BRY – Bryce Soli 37-yard field goal, 9:18. Minutemen 13–3. Drive: 9 plays, 50 yards, 3:41.
- MASS – Grant Jordan 5-yard run, 3:32. Minutemen 20–3. Drive: 7 plays, 70 yards, 3:54.
- BRY – Zyheem Collick 9-yard pass from Brennan Myer, 0:48. Minutemen 20–10. Drive: 11 plays, 69 yards, 2:37.

Third quarter

- BRY – Elijah Elliot 43-yard pass from Brennan Myer, 8:38. Minutemen 20–17. Drive: 5 plays, 80 yards, 2:12.
- MASS – Derek Morris 25-yard field goal, 1:34. Minutemen 23–17. Drive: 7 plays, 44 yards, 2:08.
- BRY – Zyheem Collick 72-yard pass from Brennan Myer, 0:42. Bulldogs 24–23. Drive: 2 plays, 76 yards, 0:45.

Fourth quarter

- MASS – Derek Morris 53-yard field goal, 4:11. Minutemen 26–24. Drive: 13 plays, 53 yards, 5:13.
- BRY – Bryce Soli 25-yard field goal, 0:00. Bulldogs 27–26. Drive: 13 plays, 78 yards, 1:45.

Statistics	BRY	MASS
First downs	25	21
Plays–yards	70–399	67–358
Rushes–yards	25–81	35–101
Passing yards	318	257
Passing: Comp–Att–Int	22–45–2	20–32–1
Turnovers	2	1
Time of possession	23:55	36:05

Team	Category	Player	Statistics
Bryant	Passing	Brennan Myer	22/44, 318 yards, 3 TD, 2 INT
Bryant	Rushing	Elijah Elliot	11 carries, 47 yards
Bryant	Receiving	Zyheem Collick	3 receptions, 94 yards, 2 TD
UMass	Passing	Grant Jordan	13/22, 205 yards, INT
UMass	Rushing	Brand Hood	11 carries, 39 yards, TD
UMass	Receiving	Jacquon Gibson	7 receptions, 89 yards

=== at Iowa ===
Game Three – UMass Minutemen (0–2) at Iowa Hawkeyes (1–1) – Game summary

Quarter	1	2	3	4	Total
Minutemen	0	7	0	0	7
Hawkeyes	20	10	10	7	47

at Kinnick Stadium • Iowa City, Iowa

- Date: September 13
- Game time: 7:30 p.m. EDT / 6:30 p.m. CDT
- Game weather: Sunny, 93 °F (34 °C)
- Game attendance: 69,250
- Referee: Jeff Servinski
- TV announcers (BTN): Mark Followill (play-by-play), Anthony Herron (analyst), and Dannie Rogers (sideline)
- Box score, Recap

Game information

First quarter

- IOWA - Seth Anderson 20-yard pass from Mark Gronowski (Drew Stevens kick), 13:29. Hawkeyes 7–0. Drive: 3 plays, 68 yards, 1:25.
- IOWA - Seth Anderson 3-yard pass from Mark Gronowski (Drew Stevens kick missed), 7:41. Hawkeyes 13–0. Drive: 7 plays, 39 yards, 3:32.
- IOWA - Kaden Wetjen 20-yard run (Drew Stevens kick), 2:08. Hawkeyes 20–0. Drive: 7 plays, 52 yards, 3:25.

Second quarter

- MASS - Grant Jordan 6-yard run (Derek Morris kick), 11:50. Hawkeyes 20–7. Drive: 4 plays, 21 yards, 2:20.
- IOWA - Drew Stevens 54-yard field goal, 9:50. Hawkeyes 23–7. Drive: 6 plays, 30 yards, 1:53.
- IOWA - Mark Gronowski 13-yard run (Drew Stevens kick), 0:26. Hawkeyes 30–7. Drive: 7 plays, 49 yards, 1:02.

Third quarter

- IOWA - Kaden Wetjen 95-yard punt return (Drew Stevens kick), 2:21. Hawkeyes 37–7.
- IOWA - Drew Stevens 27-yard field goal, 2:58. Hawkeyes 40–7. Drive: 16 plays, 61 yards, 8:11.

Fourth quarter

- IOWA - KJ Parker 2-yard pass from Hank Brown (Drew Stevens kick), 11:04. Hawkeyes 47–7. Drive: 10 plays, 57 yards, 4:05.

Statistics	MASS	IOWA
First downs	8	22
Plays–yards	49–119	71–435
Rushes–yards	27–26	40–201
Passing yards	93	234
Passing: comp–att–int	13–22–0	21–31–0
Turnovers	0	0
Time of possession	27:56	32:04

Team	Category	Player	Statistics
UMass	Passing	AJ Hairston	4/8, 56 yards
UMass	Rushing	Rocko Griffin	10 carries, 28 yards
UMass	Receiving	Jacquon Gibson	5 receptions, 37 yards
Iowa	Passing	Mark Gronowski	16/24, 179 yards, 2 TD
Iowa	Rushing	Nathan McNeil	10 carries, 56 yards
Iowa	Receiving	Sam Phillips	3 receptions, 75 yards

=== at No. 20 Missouri ===
Game Four – UMass Minutemen (0–3) at No. 20 Missouri Tigers (4–0) – Game summary

Quarter	1	2	3	4	Total
Minutemen	6	0	0	0	6
No. 20 Tigers	14	7	14	7	42

at Faurot Field • Columbia, Missouri

- Date: September 27
- Game time: 7:30 p.m. EDT / 6:30 p.m. CDT
- Game weather: Sunny, 81 °F (27 °C)
- Game attendance: 57,321
- Referee: Steve Marlowe
- TV announcers (ESPNU): Courtney Lyle (play-by-play) and Rene Ingoglia (analyst)
- Box score, Recap

Game information

First quarter

- (10:12) MIZ: Jamal Roberts 9-yard run (Robert Meyer Kick). (Drive: 7 plays, 68 yards, 3:24; Missouri 7–0)
- (4:31) MASS: Max Dowling 2-yard pass from AJ Hairston (Derek Morris kick BLOCKED). (Drive: 6 plays, 21 yards, 1:53; Missouri 7–6)
- (0:35) MIZ: Ahmad Hardy 5-yard run (Robert Meyer Kick). (Drive: 8 plays, 56 yards, 3:47; Missouri 14–6)

Second quarter

- (4:45) MIZ: Ahmad Hardy 1-yard run (Robert Meyer Kick). (Drive: 14 plays, 89 yards, 7:31; Missouri 21–6)

Third quarter

- (11:33) MIZ: Ahmad Hardy 16-yard run (Robert Meyer Kick). (Drive: 7 plays, 66 yards, 3:27; Missouri 28–6)
- (0:56) MIZ: Brett Norfleet 9-yard pass from Beau Pribula (Robert Meyer Kick). (Drive: 2 plays, 8 yards, 0:38; Missouri 35–6)

Fourth quarter

- (13:09) MIZ: Tavorus Jones 3-yard run (Robert Meyer Kick). (Drive: 5 plays, 37 yards, 2:11; Missouri 42–6)

Statistics	MASS	MIZ
First downs	9	31
Plays–yards	55–124	84–521
Rushes–yards	16–19	52–268
Passing yards	105	253
Passing: comp–att–int	14–39–1	27–32–1
Turnovers	1	1
Time of possession	21:17	38:43

Team	Category	Player	Statistics
Massachusetts	Passing	AJ Hairston	11/31, 75 yards, TD, INT
Massachusetts	Rushing	Rocko Griffin	5 carries, 23 yards
Massachusetts	Receiving	Jacquon Gibson	6 receptions, 30 yards
Missouri	Passing	Beau Pribula	26/29, 241 yards, TD, INT
Missouri	Rushing	Ahmad Hardy	24 carries, 130 yards, 3 TD
Missouri	Receiving	Kevin Coleman Jr.	12 receptions, 108 yards

=== Western Michigan ===
Game Five – Western Michigan Broncos (2–3) at UMass Minutemen (0–4) – Game summary

Quarter	1	2	3	4	Total
Broncos	0	7	7	7	21
Minutemen	3	0	0	0	3

at McGuirk Alumni Stadium • Hadley, Massachusetts

- Date: October 4
- Game time: 2:30 p.m. EDT
- Game weather: Sunny, 77 °F (25 °C)
- Game attendance: 10,014
- Referee: Matt Packowski
- TV announcers (ESPN+): Cooper Boardman (play-by-play) and Craig Haubert (analyst)
- Box score, Recap

Game information

First quarter

- (9:42) MASS – Derek Morris 36-yard field goal (Drive: 11 plays, 57 yards, 5:18; UMass 3-0)

Second quarter

- (9:23) WMU – Michael Brescia 8-yard pass from Broc Lowry, Palmer Domschke kick (Drive: 5 plays, 72 yards, 2:38; Western Michigan 7-3)

Third quarter

- (1:26) WMU – Broc Lowry 4-yard run, Palmer Domschke kick (Drive: 10 plays, 50 yards, 4:24; Western Michigan 14-3)

Fourth quarter

- (8:04) WMU – Devin Miles 25-yard run, Palmer Domschke kick (Drive: 11 plays, 87 yards, 5:58; Western Michigan 21-3)

Statistics	WMU	MASS
First downs	23	14
Plays–yards	67–380	64–260
Rushes–yards	42–217	29–57
Passing yards	163	203
Passing: Comp–Att–Int	18–25–0	20–35–1
Turnovers	2	1
Time of possession	32:26	27:34

Team	Category	Player	Statistics
Western Michigan	Passing	Broc Lowry	18/25, 163 yards, TD
Western Michigan	Rushing	Broc Lowry	15 carries, 92 yards, TD
Western Michigan	Receiving	Aveion Chenault	2 receptions, 51 yards
UMass	Passing	AJ Hairston	11/18, 131 yards, INT
UMass	Rushing	Juwaun Price	6 carries, 54 yards
UMass	Receiving	Jacquon Gibson	6 receptions, 70 yards

=== at Kent State ===
Game Six – UMass Minutemen (0–5) at Kent State Golden Flashes (1–4) – Game summary

Quarter	1	2	3	4	Total
Minutemen	0	6	0	0	6
Golden Flashes	14	7	21	0	42

at Dix Stadium • Kent, Ohio

- Date: October 11
- Game time: 2:30 p.m. EDT
- Game weather: Sunny, 64 °F (18 °C)
- Game attendance: 11,523
- Referee: Rick Warne
- TV announcers (ESPN+): Anthony Lima (play-by-play) and Doc Holliday (analyst)
- Box score, Recap

Game information

First quarter

- KENT – Da'Realyst Clark 91-yard kickoff return (Will Hryszko kick), 14:49. Golden Flashes 7–0.
- KENT – Sebastian Brown 36-yard pass from Dru DeShields (Will Hryszko kick), 5:47. Golden Flashes 14–0. Drive: 6 plays, 84 yards, 2:35.

Second quarter

- MASS – Derek Morris 39-yard field goal, 10:18. Golden Flashes 14–3. Drive: 22 plays, 54 yards, 7:23.
- KENT – Dashawn Martin 25-yard pass from Dru DeShields (Will Hryszko kick), 5:41. Golden Flashes 21–3. Drive: 10 plays, 75 yards, 4:33.
- MASS – Derek Morris 33-yard field goal, 0:00. Golden Flashes 21–6. Drive: 9 plays, 84 yards, 1:00.

Third quarter

- KENT – Terik Mulder 10-yard pass from Dru DeShields (Will Hryszko kick), 5:23. Golden Flashes 28–6. Drive: 16 plays, 80 yards, 6:18.
- KENT – Ardell Banks 34-yard pass from Dru DeShields (Will Hryszko kick), 4:07. Golden Flashes 35–6. Drive: 1 play, 34 yards, 0:06.
- KENT – Jordan Nubin 25-yard run (Will Hryszko kick), 3:22. Golden Flashes 42–6. Drive: 2 plays, 30 yards, 0:31.

Fourth quarter

- No scoring plays.

Statistics	MASS	KENT
First downs	21	17
Plays–yards	82–271	62–330
Rushes–yards	33–44	42–151
Passing yards	227	179
Passing: Comp–Att–Int	26–49–2	12–20–0
Turnovers	2	0
Time of possession	30:31	29:29

Team	Category	Player	Statistics
UMass	Passing	AJ Hairston	26/48, 227 yards, INT
UMass	Rushing	Brandon Hood	10 carries, 36 yards
UMass	Receiving	Jake McConnachie	7 receptions, 67 yards
Kent State	Passing	Dru DeShields	10/18, 148 yards, 4 TD
Kent State	Rushing	Jordan Nubin	15 carries, 80 yards, TD
Kent State	Receiving	Dashawn Martin	3 receptions, 42 yards, TD

=== Buffalo ===
Game Seven – Buffalo Bulls (3–3) at UMass Minutemen (0–6) – Game summary

Quarter	1	2	3	4	Total
Bulls	3	7	10	8	28
Minutemen	0	14	7	0	21

at McGuirk Alumni Stadium • Hadley, Massachusetts

- Date: October 18
- Game time: 2:30 p.m. EDT
- Game weather: Sunny, 62 °F (17 °C)
- Game attendance: 15,242
- Referee: Marcel Kerr
- TV announcers (ESPN+): Cooper Boardman (play-by-play) and Forrest Conoly (analyst)
- Box score, Recap

Game information

First quarter

- BUFF – Jack Howes 23-yard field goal, 4:39. Bulls 3–0. Drive: 10 plays, 85 yards, 3:52.

Second quarter

- MASS – Kezion Dia-Johnson 27-yard pass from AJ Hairston (Derek Morris kick), 9:44. Minutemen 7–3. Drive: 7 plays, 87 yards, 3:14.
- MASS – Brandon Hood 90-yard run (Derek Morris kick), 4:12. Minutemen 14–3. Drive: 1 play, 90 yards, 0:13.
- BUFF – Victor Snow 23-yard pass from Ta'Quan Roberson (Jack Howes kick), 2:55. Minutemen 14–10. Drive: 5 plays, 75 yards, 1:17.

Third quarter

- BUFF – Terrance Shelton Jr. 1-yard run (Jack Howes kick), 7:02. Bulls 17–14. Drive: 14 plays, 76 yards, 5:53.
- MASS – Max Dowling 77-yard pass from AJ Hairston (Derek Morris kick), 5:37. Minutemen 21–17. Drive: 3 plays, 75 yards, 1:25.
- BUFF – Jack Howes 47-yard field goal, 0:18. Minutemen 21–20. Drive: 9 plays, 28 yards, 3:12.

Fourth quarter

- BUFF – Victor Snow 16-yard pass from Ta'Quan Roberson (Ta'Quan Roberson pass to Nik McMillan), 0:19. Bulls 28–21. Drive: 4 plays, 50 yards, 0:22.

Statistics	BUFF	MASS
First downs	29	11
Plays–yards	85–475	58–306
Rushes–yards	30–72	44–187
Passing yards	403	119
Passing: Comp–Att–Int	36–55–1	6–14–0
Turnovers	1	0
Time of possession	34:20	25:40

Team	Category	Player	Statistics
Buffalo	Passing	Ta'Quan Roberson	36/55, 403 yards, 2 TD, INT
Buffalo	Rushing	Al-Jay Henderson	20 carries, 59 yards
Buffalo	Receiving	Nick McMillan	10 receptions, 119 yards
UMass	Passing	AJ Hairston	6/14, 119 yards, 2 TD
UMass	Rushing	Brandon Hood	24 carries, 174 yards, TD
UMass	Receiving	Max Dowling	1 reception, 77 yards, TD

=== at Central Michigan ===
Game Eight – UMass Minutemen (0–7) at Central Michigan Chippewas (4–3) – Game summary

Quarter	1	2	3	4	Total
Minutemen	7	3	3	0	13
Chippewas	21	3	14	0	38

at Kelly/Shorts Stadium • Mount Pleasant, Michigan

- Date: October 25
- Game time: 3:30 p.m. EDT
- Game weather: Cloudy, 52 °F (11 °C)
- Game attendance: 20,489
- Referee: Andrew Speciale
- TV announcers (ESPN+): Evan Stockton (play-by-play) and Reggie Walker (analyst)
- Box score, Recap

Game information

First quarter

- (9:48) CMU – Brock Townsend 1-yard run, Cade Graham kick (Drive: 7 plays, 78 yards, 4:05; Central Michigan 7-0)
- (8:05) MASS – Rocko Griffin 43-yard run, Derek Morris kick (Drive: 5 plays, 75 yards, 1:43; 7-7)
- (3:59) CMU – Brock Townsend 5-yard run, Cade Graham kick (Drive: 7 plays, 80 yards, 3:59; Central Michigan 14-7)
- (1:19) CMU – Brock Townsend 9-yard run, Cade Graham kick (Drive: 3 plays, 61 yards, 1:25; Central Michigan 21-7)

Second quarter

- (10:44) CMU – Cade Graham 29-yard field goal (Drive: 8 plays, 53 yards, 3:53; Central Michigan 24-7)
- (0:00) MASS – Derek Morris 29-yard field goal (Drive: 14 plays, 69 yards, 1:51; Central Michigan 24-10)

Third quarter

- (13:07) CMU – Brock Townsend 51-yard pass from Joe Labas, Cade Graham kick (Drive: 3 plays, 75 yards, 1:53; Central Michigan 31-10)
- (7:50) CMU – Nasir Williams 19-yard pass from Joe Labas, Cade Graham kick (Drive: 7 plays, 58 yards, 4:14; Central Michigan 38-10)
- (4:06) MASS – Derek Morris 50-yard field goal (Drive: 12 plays, 50 yards, 3:44; Central Michigan 38-13)

Fourth quarter

- No scoring plays.

Statistics	MASS	CMU
First downs	20	23
Plays–yards	77–292	66–502
Rushes–yards	26–116	53–279
Passing yards	176	223
Passing: Comp–Att–Int	21-51-1	12-13-0
Turnovers	1	1
Time of possession	22:07	37:53

Team	Category	Player	Statistics
UMass	Passing	AJ Hairston	21/51, 176 yards, INT
UMass	Rushing	Rocko Griffin	7 carries, 56 yards, TD
UMass	Receiving	Kezion Dia-Johnson	3 receptions, 41 yards
Central Michigan	Passing	Joe Labas	10/11, 148 yards, 2 TD
Central Michigan	Rushing	Nahree Biggins	10 carries, 94 yards
Central Michigan	Receiving	Brock Townsend	2 receptions, 78 yards, TD

=== at Akron ===
Game Nine – UMass Minutemen (0–8) at Akron Zips (3–6) – Game summary

Quarter	1	2	3	4	Total
Minutemen	10	0	0	0	10
Zips	14	13	10	7	44

at InfoCision Stadium–Summa Field • Akron, Ohio

- Date: November 4
- Game time: 7:00 p.m. EDT
- Game weather: Sunny
- Game attendance: 5,046
- Referee: Billy Williams
- TV announcers (CBSSN): Jordan Kent (play-by-play) and Logan Ryan (analyst)
- Box score, Recap

Game information

First quarter

- (14:11) AKR – Kyan Mason 15-yard pass from Ben Finley, Matthew Schramm kick (Drive: 3 plays, 19 yards, 0:42; Akron 7–0)
- (8:32) AKR – Israel Polk 13-yard pass from Ben Finley, Matthew Schramm kick (Drive: 9 plays, 71 yards, 4:42; Akron 14–0)
- (5:39) MASS – Magnus von Saldern 1-yard pass from AJ Hairston, Derek Morris kick (Drive: 6 plays, 70 yards, 2:53; Akron 14–7)
- (0:09) MASS – Derek Morris 55-yard field goal (Drive: 10 plays, 25 yards, 4:16; Akron 14–10)

Second quarter

- (11:48) AKR – Ben Finley 2-yard run, Matthew Schramm kick (Drive: 7 plays, 78 yards, 3:13; Akron 21–10)
- (2:14) AKR – Jordan Gant 1-yard run (Drive: 3 plays, 53 yards, 1:02; Akron 27–10)

Third quarter

- (6:33) AKR – Gage Summers 25-yard fumble recovery, Matthew Schramm kick (Akron 34–10)
- (2:23) AKR – Matthew Schramm 42-yard field goal (Drive: 8 plays, 36 yards, 2:49; Akron 37–10)

Fourth quarter

- (12:18) AKR – Jordan Gant 9-yard run, Matthew Schramm kick (Drive: 2 plays, 13 yards, 0:00; Akron 44–10)

Statistics	MASS	AKR
First downs	14	25
Plays–yards	55–169	68–467
Rushes–yards	27–77	46–237
Passing yards	92	230
Passing: Comp–Att–Int	16–28–0	14–22–0
Turnovers	3	1
Time of possession	24:47	35:13

Team	Category	Player	Statistics
UMass	Passing	AJ Hairston	12/20, 54 yards, TD
UMass	Rushing	Grant Jordan	7 carries, 51 yards
UMass	Receiving	Jacquon Gibson	6 receptions, 35 yards
Akron	Passing	Ben Finley	12/20, 197 yards, 2 TD
Akron	Rushing	Jordan Gant	28 carries, 153 yards, 2 TD
Akron	Receiving	Marcel Williams	4 receptions, 104 yards

=== Northern Illinois ===
Game Ten – Northern Illinois Huskies (2–7) at UMass Minutemen (0–9) – Game summary

Quarter	1	2	3	4	Total
Huskies	10	21	14	0	45
Minutemen	0	0	0	3	3

at McGuirk Alumni Stadium • Hadley, Massachusetts

- Date: November 12
- Game time: 7:00 p.m. EST
- Game weather: Sunny, 38 °F (3 °C)
- Game attendance: 6,155
- Referee: Rich Edwards
- TV announcers (ESPNU): Cooper Boardman (play-by-play) and Craig Haubert (analyst)
- Box score, Recap

Game information

First quarter

- (10:41) NIU – Andrew Glass 37-yard field goal (Drive: 4 plays, 6 yards, 1:36; Northern Illinois 3–0)
- (4:53) NIU – Jalen Macon 13-yard run, Andrew Glass kick (Drive: 11 plays, 66 yards, 5:06; Northern Illinois 10–0)

Second quarter

- (11:42) NIU – Elijah Porter 67-yard pass from Jalen Macon, Andrew Glass kick (Drive: 6 plays, 79 yards, 3:14; Northern Illinois 17–0)
- (2:29) NIU – Chavon Wright 1-yard run, Andrew Glass kick (Drive: 11 plays, 68 yards, 5:53; Northern Illinois 24–0)
- (1:20) NIU – Jalen Macon 1-yard run, Andrew Glass kick (Drive: 2 plays, 13 yards, 0:40; Northern Illinois 31–0)

Third quarter

- (12:05) NIU – Jalen Macon 36-yard run, Andrew Glass kick (Drive: 6 plays, 73 yards, 2:51; Northern Illinois 38–0)
- (8:16) NIU – Gary Givens III 31-yard pass from Brady Davidson, Andrew Glass kick (Drive: 2 plays, 52 yards, 0:23; Northern Illinois 45–0)

Fourth quarter

- (6:13) MASS – Derek Morris 44-yard field goal (Drive: 12 plays, 73 yards, 4:40; Northern Illinois 45–3)

Statistics	NIU	MASS
First downs	22	17
Plays–yards	63–433	67–262
Rushes–yards	55–318	25–65
Passing yards	115	197
Passing: Comp–Att–Int	6–8–0	25–42–0
Turnovers	0	1
Time of possession	33:41	26:19

Team	Category	Player	Statistics
Northern Illinois	Passing	Jalen Macon	3/4, 73 yards, TD
Northern Illinois	Rushing	Jalen Macon	12 carries, 98 yards, 3 TD
Northern Illinois	Receiving	Elijah Porter	1 reception, 67 yards, TD
UMass	Passing	Brandon Rose	11/20, 101 yards
UMass	Rushing	AJ Hairston	3 carries, 23 yards
UMass	Receiving	Jacquon Gibson	6 receptions, 64 yards

=== at Ohio ===
Game Eleven – UMass Minutemen (0–10) at Ohio Bobcats (6–4) – Game summary

Quarter	1	2	3	4	Total
Minutemen	7	0	7	0	14
Bobcats	7	14	7	14	42

at Peden Stadium • Athens, Ohio

- Date: November 18
- Game time: 7:00 p.m. EST
- Game weather: Rain
- Game attendance: 12,438
- Referee: Rick Warne
- TV announcers (CBSSN): Fran Charles (play-by-play) and Taylor McHargue (analyst)
- Box score, Recap

Game information

First quarter

- (12:05) MASS – Owen Anderson 10-yard pass from Brandon Rose (Derek Morris Kick), 7 plays, 75 yards, 2:55; MASS 7–0
- (06:03) OHIO – Parker Navarro 2-yard run (David Dellenbach kick), 11 plays, 70 yards, 6:00; Tied 7–7

Second quarter

- (07:12) OHIO – Duncan Brune 13-yard run (David Dellenbach kick), 7 plays, 64 yards, 4:23; OHIO 14–7
- (03:44) OHIO – Sieh Bangura 3-yard run (David Dellenbach kick), 5 plays, 27 yards, 2:10; OHIO 21–7

Third quarter

- (08:56) MASS – Elijah Pedro 9-yard pass from Grant Jordan (Derek Morris Kick), 10 plays, 48 yards, 4:27; OHIO 21–14
- (03:57) OHIO – Sieh Bangura 2-yard run (David Dellenbach kick), 10 plays, 73 yards, 4:59; OHIO 28–7

Fourth quarter

- (06:03) OHIO – Parker Navarro 4-yard run (David Dellenbach kick), 7 plays, 55 yards, 3:39; OHIO 35–7
- (07:12) OHIO – Duncan Brune 1-yard run (David Dellenbach kick), 7 plays, 31 yards, 3:56; OHIO 42–7

Statistics	MASS	OHIO
First downs	17	17
Plays–yards	67–215	65–391
Rushes–yards	39–125	57–363
Passing yards	90	28
Passing: Comp–Att–Int	15–28–2	3–8–0
Turnovers	3	1
Time of possession	27:17	32:43

Team	Category	Player	Statistics
UMass	Passing	Grant Jordan	10/21, 56 yards, TD, INT
UMass	Rushing	Brandon Hood	10 carries, 39 yards
UMass	Receiving	Jacquon Gibson	5 receptions, 21 yards
Ohio	Passing	Parker Navarro	3/8, 28 yards
Ohio	Rushing	Sieh Bangura	27 carries, 196 yards, 2 TD
Ohio	Receiving	Eian Pugh	1 reception, 19 yards

=== Bowling Green ===
Game Twelve – Bowling Green Falcons (3–8) at UMass Minutemen (0–11) – Game summary

Quarter	1	2	3	4	Total
Falcons	14	14	7	10	45
Minutemen	0	14	0	0	14

at McGuirk Alumni Stadium • Hadley, Massachusetts

- Date: November 25
- Game time: 4:30 p.m. EST
- Game weather: Cloudy, 46 °F (8 °C)
- Game attendance: 6,043
- Referee: Andrew Speciale
- TV announcers (ESPNU): Bill Spaulding (play-by-play) and Craig Haubert (analyst)

Game information

First quarter

- BGSU – Austyn Dendy 11-yard pass from Hunter Najm (Jackson Kleather kick), 10:18. Falcons 7–0. Drive: 8 plays, 69 yards, 4:36.
- BGSU – Brennan Ridley 87-yard pass from Hunter Najm (Jackson Kleather kick), 8:18. Falcons 14–0. Drive: 2 plays, 90 yards, 0:42.

Second quarter

- BGSU – Austyn Dendy 8-yard run (Jackson Kleather kick), 13:43. Falcons 21–0. Drive: 2 plays, 11 yards, 0:37.
- BGSU – Blane Cleaver 4-yard pass from Hunter Najm (Jackson Kleather kick), 9:44. Falcons 28–0. Drive: 5 plays, 32 yards, 2:27.
- MASS – Reece Adkins 20-yard pass from Grant Jordan (Derek Morris kick), 3:30. Falcons 28–7. Drive: 13 plays, 73 yards, 6:08.
- MASS – Max Dowling 2-yard pass from Grant Jordan (Derek Morris kick), 0:29. Falcons 28–14. Drive: 8 plays, 80 yards, 1:11.

Third quarter

- BGSU – Austyn Dendy 24-yard run (Jackson Kleather kick), 0:41. Falcons 35–14. Drive: 4 plays, 33 yards, 2:08.

Fourth quarter

- BGSU – Jackson Kleather 42-yard field goal, 7:38. Falcons 38–14. Drive: 8 plays, 33 yards, 5:11.
- BGSU – PaSean Wimberly 1-yard run (Jackson Kleather kick), 1:56. Falcons 45–14. Drive: 7 plays, 55 yards, 4:38.

Statistics	BGSU	MASS
First downs	19	16
Plays–yards	57–406	64–292
Rushes–yards	48–278	29–69
Passing yards	128	223
Passing: Comp–Att–Int	7–9–0	22–35–0
Turnovers	0	1
Time of possession	32:35	27:25

Team	Category	Player	Statistics
Bowling Green	Passing	Hunter Najm	7/9, 128 yards, 3 TD
Bowling Green	Rushing	Austyn Dendy	22 carries, 115 yards, 2 TD
Bowling Green	Receiving	Brennan Ridley	1 reception, 87 yards, TD
UMass	Passing	Grant Jordan	22/35, 223 yards, 2 TD
UMass	Rushing	Elijah Faulkner	8 carries, 36 yards
UMass	Receiving	Jacquon Wilson	10 receptions, 138 yards

== Personnel ==
=== Roster ===
2025 UMass Minutemen football team roster
Players
Coaches
Offense

Pos.	#	Name	Class
WR	0	Kenyon Massey	Fr
QB	1	Brandon Rose	Jr
WR	2	Jacquon Gibson (C)	Jr
WR	3	Elijah Pedro	Fr
RB	4	Da'Marion Alberic	Fr
WR	5	Tyree Kelly	Jr
WR	6	Savion Robinson	Jr
WR	7	Jake McConnachie	Sr
QB	8	AJ Hairston	Fr
QB	9	Grant Jordan	GS
WR	10	T.Y. Harding	Jr
TE	11	Max Dowling	Jr
WR	12	Donnie Gray	GS
QB	13	Will Perry	Fr
WR	14	Kezion Dia-Johnson	Fr
WR	15	Jenoa Alford	Fr
WR	17	Dallas Elliott	Jr
TE	18	Matt Ogunniyi	Fr
QB	19	Zachary Lawrence	Fr
RB	20	Godson Ofonagoro	Fr
RB	22	Cookie Desiderio	So
RB	23	Elijah Faulkner	Fr
RB	24	Rocko Griffin (C)	Jr
RB	26	Brandon Hood	Fr
RB	28	Juwaun Price	GS
OL	50	Gavin Wilson	Fr
OL	54	Mao Glynn II	Sr
OL	55	Benjamin Roy Jr.	Sr
OL	56	Sullivan Weidman	Jr
OL	57	Garrett Cooper	Fr
OL	62	Bradley Kamga	Fr
OL	63	Kyle Brown	GS
OL	64	Peyton Miller	So
OL	69	Brock Taylor	Fr
OL	70	Michael Entwistle	GS
OL	72	Luke Painton	GS
OL	73	Zachary Franks	GS
OL	75	Tanner Burlingame	Fr
OL	76	Riley Bloch	Fr
OL	77	Jaxon King	Jr
OL	79	Ryan Mosesso	Sr
TE	83	Reece Adkins	GS
TE	85	Magnus Von Saldern	Jr
TE	86	Jax Markovich	Fr
TE	87	Owen Anderson	Jr
TE	88	John Condakes	Fr

Defense

Pos.	#	Name	Class
LB	0	Derrieon Craig (C)	Sr
DB	1	Malcom Greene	GS
DL	2	Joshua Nobles	Sr
S	3	Kendall Bournes	Jr
S	4	DD Synder	Sr
LB	5	Tyler Martin	Jr
S	6	Jeremiah McGill	Jr
CB	7	TJ Magee	Jr
DL	9	David Onouha	Jr
DL	10	Zakudo Igwenagu	Sr
DL	11	Tim Grant-Randall	GS
CB	12	Brennen Bailey	So
CB	13	Raheim Sexil	Fr
DB	14	Ryan Barnes	Sr
DE	15	Aquan Robinson	Sr
DL	16	Marques White	GS
DL	17	Jerry Washington	Fr
LB	18	Drossos Dinos	Fr
LB	19	Rashad Henry	So
S	20	Keith Sarkodieh	Fr
LB	22	Nick Hawthorne	Fr
CB	23	Jahmale Clark	Fr
CB	24	Kamren Watkins-Hunter	Sr
S	25	Anochie Azuakolam Jr.	Fr
DB	27	Michael Pangaro	Fr
LB	29	Zachary Ferris	GS
LB	30	Donovan Dyson	So
CB	32	Jose Touron	Fr
DL	33	Erik Hehl	Jr
LB	34	Payton Andrade	So
LB	36	David Timson	Fr
S	38	Zeraun Daniel	Jr
LB	44	Timmy Hinspeter	Jr
LB	45	Kyle Ott	Jr
DL	49	Shambre Jackson	Sr
LB	52	Dean Shaffer	GS
DL	54	Malachi Madison	Jr
DL	55	Jaden Wiggins	So
DL	90	Tim Passmore Jr.	Jr
DT	91	Shymell Davis (C)	Sr
DL	92	Romando Johnson	Fr
DL	97	Jermaine Wiggins Jr.	Jr

Special teams

Pos.	#	Name	Class
LS	39	James Horton	Fr
P	43	Edward Phillipson	Fr
PK	46	Marcus Lye	Sr
LS	47	Jovoni Borbon (C)	GS
PK	94	Bennett Abbe	Sr
P	98	Keegan Andrews (C)	Sr
PK	99	Derek Morris	So

Head coach

- Joe Harasymiak

Coordinators/assistant coaches

- Mike Bajakian
  Offensive coordinator
- Jared Keyte
  Defensive coordinator
- Joe Castellitto
  Special teams coordinator
- Kurt Anderson
  Offensive line
- Nyeem Wartman-White
  Defensive line
- Jeremy Larkin
  Running backs
- Jordan Hogan
  Wide receivers
- Matt Layman
  Tight ends
- Garrett Gillick
  Linebackers
- Donald Celiscar
  Defensive backs
- Jim Reid
  Senior Offensive Analyst

Legend

- (C) Team captain
- (S) Suspended
- (I) Ineligible
- Injured
- Redshirt

Roster
Last update: August 17, 2025

=== Coaching staff ===
Since December 4, 2024, the head coach of the UMass Minutemen has been Joe Harasymiak. He heads a staff of eleven assistant coaches, two graduate assistants, and numerous other support staff.

Name	Position	Seasons at UMass	Alma mater
Joe Harasymiak	Head Coach	1	Springfield College (2007)
Mike Bajakian	Offensive coordinator/Quarterbacks	1	Williams College
Jared Keyte	Defensive coordinator	1	Utica University (2012)
Kurt Anderson	Offensive line	1	Michigan (2001)
Jeremy Larkin	Running backs	1	Northwestern (2018)
Jordan Hogan	Wide receivers	1	SUNY Brockport
Matt Layman	Tight Ends	7	Mars Hill University
Nyeem Wartman-White	Defensive line	1	Penn State (2016)
Garrett Gillick	Linebackers	1	UMaine (2000)
Tre' Bell	Defensive backs	1	UConn (2018)
Joe Castellitto	Special teams coordinator	1	Utica University (2017)
Jim Reid	Analyst	20	UMaine (1972)
Drew Belcher	Offensive Analyst / QBs	1	UMaine (2019)
Jake Lane	Defensive Analyst	1	UMass (2022)
Kayon Whitaker	Defensive Analyst	1	UMaine (2019)
Jake Fire	Defensive Grad. Assistant	1	URI (2022)
Joey Rahal	Special teams Grad. Assistant	1	UCF

=== Support Staff ===
Name	Position	Years at UMass	Alma mater
Tim Silvernail	Assistant AD of Football Administration	2024	University of Massachusetts (2014)
Rory Pommerening	General Manager	-	University of North Carolina (2008)
George Green	Head Performance Coach	2025	Springfield College (2008)
Thomas Bacchia	Sports Performance Coach	-	
Ed Sykes	Sports Performance Coach	-	
Bill Sisler	Video Coordinator	18th	James Madison University (1995)
Michaela Day	Head Athletic Trainer	2023	Merrimack College (2020)
Elizabeth Fuller	Assistant Athletic Trainer	2023	University of New England
Patrick Griffin	Assistant Athletic Trainer	2023	Plymouth State (2019)
Kevin Juszynski	Director of Football Operations	2025	Penn State
Ben Hodges	Director Of Football Team Services	-	
Tess Abbott	Director of On-Campus Recruiting & Administrative Operations	-	
Spencer Wright	Equipment Assistant	-	
