= W. W. Watson =

W. W. Watson may refer to:

- William W. Watson Sr., 19th century North Carolina politician
- William Weldon Watson (1899–1992), American nuclear physicist
