= Brandon Rose =

American football player

No. 14 – Utah Utes
- Position: Quarterback
- Class: Redshirt Junior

Personal information
- Listed height: 6 ft 2 in (1.88 m)
- Listed weight: 212 lb (96 kg)

Career information
- High school: Murrieta Valley (Murrieta, California)
- College: Utah (2022–2024); UMass (2025); Utah (2026–present)
- Stats at ESPN

Brandon Rose is an American college football quarterback for the Utah Utes. He previously played for the UMass Minutemen.

== Early life ==
Rose attended Murrieta Valley High School in Murrieta, California. He was rated as a three-star recruit and committed to play college football for the Utah Utes.

== College career ==
=== Utah (first stint) ===
Rose was redshirted in 2022 and did not appear in any games in 2023 either. In week 9 of the 2024 season, he entered the game in the third quarter and completed seven of 15 passing attempts for 45 yards and an interception in a 17-14 loss to the Houston Cougars. Heading into the Utes week 10 matchup versus the BYU Cougars, Rose was announced as the team's starting quarterback. In his first start, he completed 12 of 21 pass attempts for 112 yards and two touchdowns, while also adding 55 yards on the ground as he almost led the Utes to an upset win over the #9 BYU. Following the game, Rose was ruled out for the remainder of the season with a leg injury. Rose finished the 2024 season completing 19 of his 36 pass attempts for 157 yards and two touchdowns, with two interceptions, while also adding 66 yards on the ground in three games.

On December 7, 2024, Rose entered the transfer portal.

=== UMass ===
On January 9, 2025, Rose announced that he would transfer to UMass. He won the starting job for the season opener against Temple.

=== Utah (second stint) ===
On June 1, 2026, Rose returned to Utah.

=== Statistics ===
Season	Team	Games			Passing								Rushing			
Season	Team	GP	GS	Record	Cmp	Att	Pct	Yds	Y/A	TD	Int	Rtg	Att	Yds	Avg	TD
2022	Utah	0	0	—	Redshirted (redshirt)											
2023	Utah	0	0	—	DNP											
2024	Utah	3	1	0–1	19	36	52.8	157	4.4	2	2	96.6	11	66	6.0	0
2025	UMass	6	3	0–3	52	88	59.1	424	4.8	1	3	96.5	27	4	0.1	0
2026	Utah	0	0	—												
Career		9	4	0–4	71	124	57.3	581	4.7	3	5	96.5	38	70	1.8	0
