= Max Warner =

American football player and coach

Current position
- Title: Offensive coordinator
- Team: UMass
- Conference: MAC

Biographical details
- Education: Millikin (2006); Fort Hays State (2009)

Playing career
- 2002–2006: Millikin
- Positions: Quarterback; Defensive back

Coaching career (HC unless noted)
- 2006: Lakeland College (DB)
- 2007: North Carolina Wesleyan (WR)
- 2008: Carlstad Crusaders (OC)
- 2008–2009: Fort Hays State (RB)
- 2010: DeForest High School (passing game coordinator)
- 2011–2014: Hillsborough High School (OC)
- 2015: Virginia Tech (OQC)
- 2016–2018: Bloomingdale High School
- 2019–2021: Bowling Green (QB)
- 2022–2024: Bowling Green (co-OC/QB)
- 2025: Toledo (OA)
- 2026–present: UMass (OC)

Max Warner is an American college football coach and former player. He is the offensive coordinator for the University of Massachusetts Amherst football team, a position he has held since 2026. He played college football for Millikin College.

== Playing career ==
Warner played college football for the Millikin Big Blue, an NCAA Division III program. At Millikin, Warner was a three-year letter winner at the quarterback and defensive back positions, graduating with his bachelor’s in 2006.

== Coaching career ==
Prior to joining Bowling Green, Warner held coaching positions at Lakeland College (defensive backs coach), North Carolina Wesleyan (wide receivers coach), Carlstad Crusaders (offensive coordinator), Fort Hays State (running backs coach), DeForest High School (passing game coordinator), Hillsborough High School (offensive coordinator), Virginia Tech (offensive quality control coach), and Bloomingdale High School (head coach).

In 2019, Warner was hired as a quarterbacks coach at Bowling Green.

In 2022, Warner was elevated to the position of co-Offensive coordinator at Bowling Green.

While at Bowling Green, Warner coached future NFL players Connor Bazelak and Harold Fannin Jr.

During the 2025 season, Warner was an offensive analyst at Toledo.

In February 2026, Warner was hired as the offensive coordinator at UMass Amherst.

== Personal life ==
Warner’s hometown is Crystal Lake, Illinois. He is married to his wife Kaitlyn and has three children.
