= William Watson (surgeon) =

William Watson (1837–1879), was a surgeon in the 105th Regiment of Pennsylvania Volunteers during the American Civil War. During his duty in the Army of the Potomac, he took part in several battles including Fredericksburg, Chancellorsville, the Wilderness, and Gettysburg notably. Major Watson is recognized most by his contribution to the understanding of soldier life during the Civil War, ranging from the battles themselves to the internal conflicts within the unit.

== Early life and career ==
William Watson was born in Bedford, Pennsylvania. He had six younger sisters—Ella, Eliza, Margaret, Charlotte, Emma, and Marie. Raised by his father Dr. William Hartley Watson, he followed in his father's footsteps and attended Lafayette College, proceeding to the University of Pennsylvania School of Medicine to graduate.

== Civil War ==
Watson was a strong Union supporter. On September 12, 1862, at the age of 25, having recently completed medical school, Watson joined the ranks of the 105th Pennsylvania. He was given the rank of major and designated as the surgeon of his regiment. Watson was formally commissioned by Pennsylvania Governor Andrew Gregg Curtin on September 16, 1862. On December 19, 1862, Watson joined his regiment at Camp Prescott, later to be renamed Camp Prescott Smith, in Virginia.

=== The early letters ===
Watson's early letters to his father and sisters displayed the difficult process he endured to join his regiment. He explains the red-tape of the army, from not receiving a uniform in Washington DC, to the need to receive signed passes from his commanding officers to make passage from Washington to Camp Prescott in Virginia. Once Watson joined the regiment at Camp Prescott, he describes the lifestyle of a soldier living in a camp such as Camp Prescott. In a letter to his father written on September 20, 1862, he describes to his father the theft of his overcoat and the need for a horse. The assistant surgeons of his regiment were, as he describes, well mounted, he felt that he too should be well mounted as their commanding officer.

=== The impact of war on Watson's views ===
Watson's wartime accounts shed reality to the life of a soldier after battle. On December 15, 1862, he describes the aftermath of the battle he was witnessed to his father. Watson is quoted saying "I only trust I shall never witness another battle.

In a letter to his sister Ella written on January 17, 1863, he writes, "Truly the American soldier demands the admiration of the whole world. He is ever cheerful, courageous, and non complaining. Defeated to day, he willingly and cheerfully renews the conflict tomorrow." A romantic view of the American Civil War veteran, he overlooks the daily, less patriotic concerns of the soldiers regarding nutrition, rest, and not becoming a casualty.

=== The late letters ===
After describing his experiences at other major battles including Gettysburg and the Wilderness, Watson writes his last letter as a soldier to his sister Marie on May 21, 1865. He is penniless, living on credit.

== Postbellum ==
Major William Watson was discharged on May 27, 1865. He then returned to Bedford, Pennsylvania, to start his own medical practice. Watson joined the Grand Army of the Republic. At the age of forty-one in 1879, William Watson died. Bedford honored their veteran by naming their militia facility Camp Watson.
