= William Watson (Scottish physicist) =

Scottish physicist and mathematician (1884–1952)

William Watson FRSE (15 June 1884 – 28 June 1952) was a 20th-century Scottish physicist and mathematician.

== Life ==
He was born on 15 June 1884 in Musselburgh just east of Edinburgh, the son of Janet Watson of Tranent and her husband, William Watson of Fossoway, then headmaster of Musselburgh Grammar School. He attended his father's school from 1891 to 1898 then completed his education at the Royal High School, Edinburgh. He was school dux in 1902.

He matriculated at the University of Edinburgh in 1902, originally studying classics, but then transferred to study mathematics and natural philosophy (Physics). He graduated with an MA in 1907. He then undertook postgraduate studies at the University of Leipzig in Germany. Returning to Edinburgh for further postgraduate study, he then decided to train as a teacher. In 1912 he was appointed Head of Physics at Heriot-Watt College.

In 1923 he was elected a Fellow of the Royal Society of Edinburgh. His proposers were Francis Gibson Baily, Henry Briggs, Alfred Archibald Boon and Arthur Pillans Laurie.

He retired in 1944 and died in Edinburgh on 28 June 1952. He was unmarried and had no children.

== Publications ==
- A Textbook of Physics
