= Jared Keyte =

American football player and coach

Current position
- Title: Defensive coordinator
- Team: UMass
- Conference: MAC

Biographical details
- Education: Utica College (2012)

Playing career
- 2008–2011: Utica
- Position: Quarterback

Coaching career (HC unless noted)
- 2012: Utica (QB)
- 2013: Springfield (GA)
- 2014: Springfield (co-DC)
- 2015: Rutgers (DQC)
- 2016–2017: Maine (OLB)
- 2018: Maine (ST/OLB)
- 2019–2021: Maine (ST/S)
- 2022: Maine (DC/LB)
- 2023: Rutgers (DQC/interim DL)
- 2024: Rutgers (nickels)
- 2025–present: UMass (DC)

Jared Keyte is an American college football coach. He is the defensive coordinator for the University of Massachusetts Amherst, a position he has held since 2025. He also coached for Utica, Springfield, Rutgers, and Maine. He played college football for Utica as a quarterback.

== Playing career ==
Keyte was raised in Holland Patent, New York, and attended Holland Patent High School. He was a multi-sport athlete, competing in football, basketball, and baseball. As a member of the football team, he played quarterback and defensive back and in 2006, his junior year, he led the football team to a 7–2 record and was named as a first-team all-star.

Keyte played amateur baseball for the Northern Community Outlaws in Holland Patent and was a guard for his school's basketball team.

Keyte played quarterback at Utica University. He was a four-year letterwinner at Utica. Throughout his career, he primarily served as a backup. He graduated with a degree in criminal justice in 2012.

== Coaching career ==
Keyte began his coaching career at Utica as a quarterbacks coach in 2012.

In 2013, Keyte joined Springfield College as a graduate assistant, coaching the defensive backs and linebackers. In 2014, he was promoted to co-defensive coordinator in the absence of former defensive coordinator Jack Holik.

In 2015, Keyte earned his first coaching position at the FBS level of college football, working as a defensive quality control coach at Rutgers.

In 2016, Keyte was hired as the outside linebackers coach and video coordinator for Maine. In 2018, he was promoted to special teams coordinator. For the 2022 season, Keyte served as the defensive coordinator and linebackers coach.

In 2023, Keyte returned to Rutgers and served as a defensive quality control and interim defensive line coach. In 2024, Keyte served as a nickels coach for Rutgers. Keyte was part of defensive coordinator Joe Harasymiak's staff, where he helped lead Rutgers to two-consecutive bowl games for the first time since 2011 and 2012.

On January 21, 2025, Keyte was announced as defensive coordinator for UMass Minutemen football under new head coach Joe Harasymiak.
