= Pop Watson =

American football player (born 2004)

William Watson III
No. 5 – UMass Minutemen
- Position: Quarterback
- Class: Senior

Personal information
- Born: June 8, 2004 (age 22); Springfield, Massachusetts, U.S.
- Listed height: 6 ft 0 in (1.83 m)
- Listed weight: 210 lb (95 kg)

Career information
- High school: Springfield Central (Springfield)
- College: Virginia Tech (2023–2025); UMass (2026–present)
- Stats at ESPN

William "Pop" Waverly Watson III (born June 8, 2004) is an American college football quarterback for the UMass Minutemen. He previously played for the Virginia Tech Hokies.

== Early life ==
Watson was born on June 8, 2004, and attended Springfield Central High School in Springfield, Massachusetts. He led them to two Massachusetts Intercollegiate Athletics Association (MIAA) Division I state championships at quarterback. Watson was named the 2022 Massachusetts Gatorade Football Player of the Year.

== College career ==
=== Virginia Tech ===
In 2023, as a freshman, he appeared in two games where he rushed for 40 yards. He was briefly suspended from the team for reportedly missing curfew. The following year, Watson played in five games, starting two, completing 34 of 58 passes (58.6%) for 481 yards, one touchdown, two interceptions, 19 rushing yards, one rushing touchdown. In 2025, he appeared in four games, completing two of four passes for 77 yards and had nine rushes for 22 yards and a touchdown. On December 26, 2025, Watson entered the transfer portal.

=== UMass ===
On January 11, 2026, Watson committed to UMass. Watson began the 2026 season as a starting quarterback for the first time in his career. In the season opener against Big Ten opponent Rutgers, he completed 19 of 22 passes for 197 yards and three touchdowns, leading UMass to a 37–21 victory. The win snapped the Minutemen's 16-game losing streak and gave them their first victory over an FBS opponent since defeating Army in 2023. UMass entered the game as a 29.5-point underdog.

== Career statistics ==
=== College ===
Year	Team	Games			Passing								Rushing			
Year	Team	GP	GS	Record	Cmp	Att	Pct	Yds	Y/A	TD	Int	Rtg	Att	Yds	Y/A	TD
2023	Virginia Tech	2	0	—	0	1	0.0	0	0.0	0	0	0.0	5	40	8.0	0
2024	Virginia Tech	5	2	1–1	34	58	58.6	481	8.3	1	2	127.1	40	19	0.5	1
2025	Virginia Tech	4	0	—	2	4	50.0	77	19.3	0	0	211.7	9	22	2.4	1
2026	UMass	5	5	4–1	74	100	74.0	820	8.2	7	2	162.0	30	167	5.6	4
Career		16	7	5–2	110	163	67.5	1,378	8.5	8	4	149.8	84	248	3.0	6
