= Joe Harasymiak =

American football player and coach (born 1986)

Current position
- Title: Head coach
- Team: UMass
- Conference: MAC
- Record: 5–18

Biographical details
- Born: June 23, 1986 (age 40); Ridgewood, New Jersey, U.S.

Playing career
- 2004–2007: Springfield (MA)
- Position: Defensive back

Coaching career (HC unless noted)
- 2008: Maine Maritime (assistant)
- 2009–2010: Springfield (MA) (GA)
- 2011–2013: Maine (DB)
- 2014–2015: Maine (DC/LB)
- 2016–2018: Maine
- 2019: Minnesota (S)
- 2020–2021: Minnesota (co-DC/S)
- 2022–2024: Rutgers (DC)
- 2025–present: UMass

Head coaching record
- Overall: 25–33
- Tournaments: 2–1 (NCAA D-I playoffs)

Accomplishments and honors

Championships
- 1 CAA (2018)

Awards
- 2018 FCS Coach of the Year (AFCA)

Joe Harasymiak (born June 23, 1986) is an American college football coach who is the head coach at the University of Massachusetts Amherst. He was the defensive coordinator at Rutgers University from 2022–2024. He was previously the co-defensive coordinator and safeties coach at the University of Minnesota.

In December 2015, Harasymiak became the youngest head coach in NCAA Division I football when he was named to the post at the University of Maine. He served as head coach of the Maine Black Bears from 2016 to 2018, leading them to a record of 20–15 in three seasons. His 2018 Maine Black Bears football team won the Colonial Athletic Association (CAA) and advanced to the semifinals of the NCAA Division I Football Championship playoffs.

== Early life ==
Harasymiak was born in Ridgewood, New Jersey. He grew up in Waldwick, New Jersey and was a quarterback for the football team at Waldwick High School. He graduated with a physical education degree from Springfield College, where he played football as a defensive back and served as a team captain. During his time at Springfield, Harasymiak set a school record of 17 interceptions.

== Coaching career ==
=== Early coaching career ===
Harasymiak began his coaching career at the Maine Maritime Academy in 2008 and the following year became a graduate assistant at Springfield College working with quarterbacks and wide receivers

=== Maine ===
Harasymiak was hired by the University of Maine in February 2011 to coach the defensive backs. He remained in that position until the end of the 2013 season when was promoted to defensive coordinator for Maine for the 2014 and 2015 seasons, during which time the Black Bears defense finished in the top 3 in conference and top 20 nationwide. He assumed the role of interim head coach in November 2015.

On December 16, 2015, University of Maine Director of Athletics Karlton Creech announced Harasymiak as the head coach for University of Maine football. At the time he was the youngest Division I head coach.

==== 2016 ====
In his first year as head coach, Harasymiak led the Black Bears to a 6–5 mark doubled its total from the 2015 season, including a 5–3 record in inter-division games. The Black Bears, ended the year fifth in the CAA standings, totaling the school's most league wins since Maine's CAA title season in 2013.

==== 2017 ====
In 2017 the team regressed to a 4–6 record. Though individually, eight Black Bears earned All-CAA honors under Harasymiak's tutelage.

==== 2018 ====
In 2018, he led Maine to a 10–4 record, with a 7–1 conference mark and a CAA championship its first since 2013. Maine advanced to its first FCS national semifinal appearance in its history. Harasymiak was awarded FCS coach of the year by the American Football Coaches Association after the Black Bears' historic season.

=== Minnesota ===
Harasymiak decided to go to the FBS level and joined the Minnesota staff in December 2018 as the team's safeties coach under defensive coordinator Joe Rossi who he worked with at Maine. In February 2020 he was promoted to Defensive Backs, Safeties and Co-Defensive Coordinator.

=== Rutgers ===
On January 7, 2022, it was announced that Harasymiak would join Rutgers as the team's defensive coordinator.

=== UMass ===
The University of Massachusetts Amherst hired Harasymiak as its new head coach on December 4, 2024. He succeeded Don Brown, who was fired after posting a 6–28 record in his second stint with the institution. In the first season under Harasymiak, the Minutemen went winless, finishing 0–12.

== Head coaching record ==
| Year | Team | Overall | Conference | Standing | Bowl/playoffs | STATS^{#} | FCS^{°} |
|---|---|---|---|---|---|---|---|
Maine Black Bears (Colonial Athletic Association) (2016–2018)
| 2016 | Maine | 6–5 | 5–3 | T–4th | | | |
| 2017 | Maine | 4–6 | 3–5 | T–7th | | | |
| 2018 | Maine | 10–4 | 7–1 | 1st | L NCAA Division I Semifinal | 4 | 5 |
| Maine: | | 20–15 | 15–9 | | | | |
UMass Minutemen (Mid American Conference) (2025–present)
| 2025 | UMass | 0–12 | 0–8 | 13th | | | |
| 2026 | UMass | 5–6 | 2–5 | | | | |
| UMass: | | 5–18 | 2–13 | | | | |
| Total: | | 25–33 | | | | | |
National championship Conference title Conference division title or championship game berth
