= William Watson (basketball) =

American basketball player

William Watson was one of the first African-American basketball players to lead an integrated team to a championship. In 1924 Watson's Lane Tech High School met Wendell Phillips High School to dispute the championship of the Chicago Public High School League. Watson's quintet won 18-4, and he was hailed by the black Chicago Defender newspaper as a hero, despite the newspaper's preference for the all-black Wendell Phillips club.

Remaining in Chicago after high school, Watson went on to become a founding member of the Giles Post Legion squad and the Savoy Big Five, both direct precursors of today's Harlem Globetrotters. Legendary GlobeTrotters owner Abe Saperstein created a 'mirror' Globetrotters club patterned after the team founded by Watson's friend and old Wendell Phillips rival, Tommy Brookins.
