= William W. Watson Sr. =

North Carolina Republican politician

William W. Watson Sr. was an American politician. He was a Republican Party political leader in Edgecombe County, North Carolina. He served in the North Carolina House of Representatives.

In 1881 he served in the North Carolina House of Representatives along with fellow Edgecombe County representative Clinton Wesley Battle who was also African American.

== See also ==
- African American officeholders from the end of the Civil War until before 1900
- List of first African-American U.S. state legislators
