= William Watson (sergeant) =

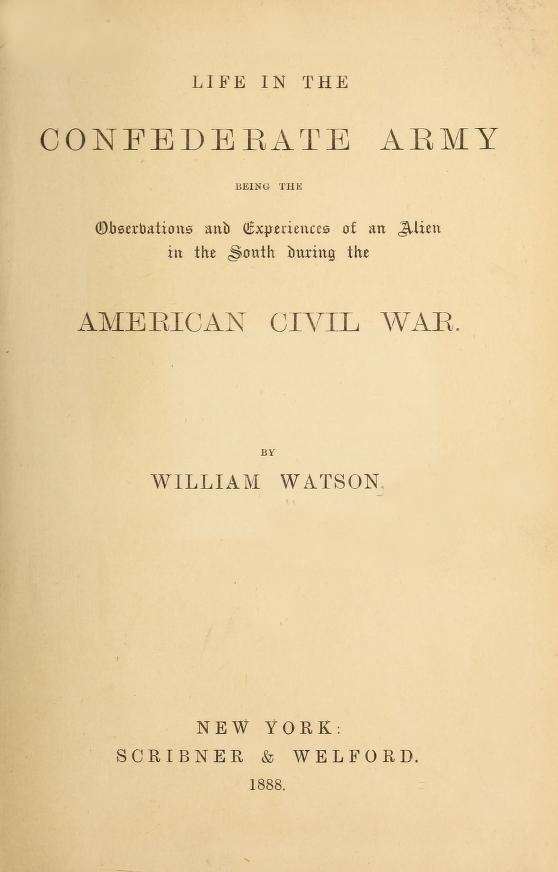
"Life in the Confederate army" (1888) title page

William Bryant Watson (born c. 1826, died 1906) was a writer and soldier in the Confederate States Army during the American Civil War. He is most noted for an autobiographical book Life in the Confederate army, being the observations and experiences of an alien in the South during the American Civil War (1888) that he wrote after the war chronicling his army life.

== Biography ==
William Watson was born in about 1826 in the Scottish village of Skelmorlie, some twenty-five miles west of Glasgow on the Firth of Clyde. His father, a landscape gardener named Henry Watson, had been born in England. He had come to Skelmorlie in 1820 to lay out the grounds of Ashcraig, the estate of Andrew D. Campbell, a retired sugar planter.

Trained as an shipbuilding engineer, Watson immigrated about 1845 to the Caribbean Islands, where he worked as a civil engineer and occasional captain of sailing vessels. Sometime about 1850 he moved to Louisiana and by 1860 was part owner of a sawmill and a coal and steamboat business in Baton Rouge.

He joined the local Rifle Volunteers, and when the Civil War broke out enlisted in the Confederate Army. Other British citizens had joined up for various motivations, including financial interests as well as support for the cause. Watson was sympathetic to the Confederacy, and also conscious of social pressure on his business to contribute "at least one man to the service." He disapproved of secession and was critical of the leadership, but felt it would have discredited both himself and his Scottish countrymen to withdraw from his commitment when war commenced. He was also aware foreigners who did not volunteer would be coerced, or be persecuted by being banished and their property confiscated. He was a sergeant in the 3rd Louisiana Infantry and served in a number of military campaigns with the regiment.

His battles included Oak Hills, Pea Ridge and Beechgrove. Watson was then discharged, and became a blockade runner, initially with schooners and then as a steam vessel master.

== Postbellum ==
After the war, Watson returned to Scotland and began a business in Greenock. He had three houses built in Skelmorlie, and named these houses, to commemorate his war service; Oakhill, Pea Ridge and Beechgrove. Living in Pea Ridge, he wrote Life In The Confederate Army: Being The Observations And Experiences Of An Alien In The South During The American Civil War, published in 1888. This was followed in 1892 by The Adventures Of A Blockade Runner; Or, Trade In Time Of War.
