= 2026 Mountain West Conference football season =

28th season of Mountain West Conference football in 2026

- League: NCAA Division I FBS
- Sport: Football
- Duration: August 29, 2026 – December 4, 2026
- Teams: 10
- TV partner(s): CBS Sports (CBS, CBSSN); Fox Sports (Fox, FS1, FS2); CW Sports

2027 NFL draft

Regular season

Championship Game
- Date: December 4, 2026

Seasons
- 2025 2027

2026 Mountain West Conference football standings
	Conf.			Overall
Team	W		L	W		L
New Mexico	6	–	1	9	–	2
North Dakota State	6	–	2	9	–	2
Wyoming	6	–	2	7	–	4
Air Force	5	–	2	9	–	2
UNLV	5	–	2	7	–	4
Nevada	4	–	3	5	–	6
San Jose State	3	–	5	5	–	7
Hawaii	2	–	6	3	–	8
UTEP	0	–	7	1	–	10
Northern Illinois	0	–	7	0	–	11
Championship: December 4, 2026
As of November 22, 2026; Rankings from CFP rankings

The 2026 Mountain West Conference football season is the 28th season of college football play for the Mountain West Conference. It is part of the 2026 NCAA Division I FBS football season. 10 teams compete in the conference during the season. The season began on August 29, 2026, and will conclude with the Mountain West Conference Football Championship Game on December 4, 2026. The full season schedule was released on March 9, 2026.

== Conference realignment ==
This season starts a new era for the Mountain West. After the 2025 season, marquee schools Boise State, Colorado State, Fresno State, San Diego State, and Utah State all departed to the Pac-12 Conference. At the same time, the conference welcomed new members to fill their spots. Two new full members joined the conference, one being Hawaii which was already a football-only member, and the other being UTEP. UTEP came to the conference from Conference USA, and Hawaii left its former full-time home of the Western Athletic Conference. Additionally, the conference added two football-only members. Northern Illinois moved its program over from its longtime home of the Mid-American Conference, while the bulk of its athletic program moved to the Horizon League. North Dakota State joined the conference from the Football Championship Subdivision (FCS) and the Missouri Valley Football Conference (MVFC). The Bison played in the FCS since they started their Division I transition in 2004, and they played in the MVFC since 2008. North Dakota State was initially going to be ineligible for any postseason play due to the NCAA-mandated two-year transition period, however on June 24, 2026 the NCAA Division I cabinet enacted a recommendation from the NCAA Division I Football Bowl Subdivision subcommittee to allow all current and future programs reclassifying to FBS to be immediately eligible for all postseason events, such as bowl games, the Mountain West championship game, and the College Football Playoff.

== Coaches ==
=== Coaching changes ===
- On February 18, 2026, Thomas Hammock announced his resignation as head coach of the Huskies. Northern Illinois promoted defensive coordinator Rob Harley to interim head coach the same day.

=== Head coaches ===
Team	Head coach	Years at school	Overall record	Record at school	MW record
Air Force	Troy Calhoun	20	139–97	139–97	83–63
Hawaii	Timmy Chang	5	22–29	22–29	13–18
Nevada	Jeff Choate	3	34–41	6–19	2–13
New Mexico	Jason Eck	2	35–17	9–4	6–2
North Dakota State	Tim Polasek	3	26–3	26–3	0–0
Northern Illinois	Rob Harley	1	0–0	0–0	0–0
San Jose State	Ken Niumatalolo	3	119–98	10–15	5–10
UNLV	Dan Mullen	2	113–65	10–4	6–2
UTEP	Scotty Walden	3	5–19	5–19	0–0
Wyoming	Jay Sawvel	3	7–17	7–17	4–11

Records are current from the end of the 2025 season

== Preseason ==
The Mountain West decided to not compose a preseason media/coaches poll due to ongoing realignment and player movement.

=== Preseason All-Conference awards ===
Mountain West preseason awards and all-conference teams were announced on July 15, 2026.

==== Awards ====
Award	Player	Class	Position	Team
Offensive Player of the Year	Micah Alejado	So.	QB	Hawai'i
Defensive Player of the Year	Jaxton Eck	Sr.	LB	New Mexico
Special Teams Player of the Year	Jackson Williams	Jr.	PR/KR	North Dakota State

==== All-conference team ====
Position	Player	Class	Team
Offense
QB	Micah Alejado	So.	Hawai'i
WR	Pofele Ashlock	Sr.	Hawai'i
WR	Troy Omeire	Sr.	New Mexico
WR	Taeshaun Lyons	Jr.	UNLV
RB	Owen Allen	Sr.	Air Force
RB	Jai'Den Thomas	Sr.	UNLV
OL	Jack Foster	Sr.	Nevada
OL	Malik Aliane	Sr.	New Mexico
OL	Griffin Empey	Jr.	North Dakota State
OL	Austin Boyd	Sr.	UNLV
OL	Rex Johnsen	Sr.	Wyoming
TE	Cade Keith	So.	New Mexico
Defense
DL	Dylan LaBarbera	Sr.	Nevada
DL	Brian Booker	Sr.	New Mexico
DL	Keenan Wilson	Jr.	North Dakota State
DL	Lucas Conti	Jr.	UNLV
LB	Blake Fletcher	Sr.	Air Force
LB	Jamih Otis	Sr.	Hawai'i
LB	Jaxton Eck	Sr.	New Mexico
LB	Ethan Stuhlsatz	Gr.	Wyoming
DB	Elijah Palmer	Sr.	Hawai'i
DB	Aiden Walker	So.	Nevada
DB	Darius Givance	Sr.	North Dakota State
DB	Jake Pope	Sr.	UNLV
Special Teams
P	Bart Edmiston	Sr.	Wyoming
PK	Joe McFadden	Gr.	Nevada
PR	Jackson Williams	Jr.	North Dakota State
KR	Jackson Williams	Jr.	North Dakota State

== Rankings ==
		Pre	Wk 1	Wk 2	Wk 3	Wk 4	Wk 5	Wk 6	Wk 7	Wk 8	Wk 9	Wk 10	Wk 11	Wk 12	Wk 13	Wk 14	Wk 15	Final
Air Force	AP	—	—	—	—	—	—	—	—	—	—	—	RV					
Air Force	C	—	—	—	—	—	—	—	RV	—	—	RV	RV					
Air Force	CFP	Not released									—	—	—					
Hawaii	AP	—	—	—	—	—	—	—	—	—	—	—	—					
Hawaii	C	RV	—	—	—	—	—	—	—	—	—	—	—					
Hawaii	CFP	Not released									—	—	—					
Nevada	AP	—	—	—	—	—	—	—	—	—	—	—	—					
Nevada	C	—	—	—	—	—	—	—	—	—	—	—	—					
Nevada	CFP	Not released									—	—	—					
New Mexico	AP	RV	—	—	—	—	—	RV	RV	RV	22	23	RV					
New Mexico	C	RV	RV	RV	—	RV	RV	RV	RV	RV	25	25	RV					
New Mexico	CFP	Not released									—	—	—					
North Dakota State	AP	—	—	RV	RV	RV	RV	—	—	—	—	—	RV					
North Dakota State	C	—	RV	RV	RV	RV	RV	—	RV	—	RV	—	RV					
North Dakota State	CFP	Not released									—	—	—					
Northern Illinois	AP	—	—	—	—	—	—	—	—	—	—	—	—					
Northern Illinois	C	—	—	—	—	—	—	—	—	—	—	—	—					
Northern Illinois	CFP	Not released									—	—	—					
San Jose State	AP	—	—	—	—	—	—	—	—	—	—	—	—					
San Jose State	C	—	—	—	—	—	—	—	—	—	—	—	—					
San Jose State	CFP	Not released									—	—	—					
UNLV	AP	RV	—	—	—	—	—	—	—	—	—	—	—					
UNLV	C	RV	RV	—	—	—	—	—	—	—	—	—	—					
UNLV	CFP	Not released									—	—	—					
UTEP	AP	—	—	—	—	—	—	—	—	—	—	—	—					
UTEP	C	—	—	—	—	—	—	—	—	—	—	—	—					
UTEP	CFP	Not released									—	—	—					
Wyoming	AP	—	—	—	—	—	—	—	—	—	—	—	RV					
Wyoming	C	—	—	—	—	—	—	—	—	—	—	—	—					
Wyoming	CFP	Not released									—	—	—					

Legend
	Improvement in ranking
	Drop in ranking
	Not ranked previous week
	No change in ranking from previous week
RV	Received votes but were not ranked in Top 25 of poll
т	Tied with team above or below also with this symbol

== Schedule ==
The schedule was released on March 9, 2026.

Index to colors and formatting
MW member won
MW member lost
MW teams in **bold**

All times Mountain time.

=== Week 0 ===
Date	Time	Visiting team	Home team	Site	TV	Result	Attendance	Ref.
August 29	1:00 PM	**San Jose State**	No. 14т USC	Los Angeles Memorial Coliseum • Los Angeles, CA	NBC	**L** 26–42	51,144	
August 29	3:30 PM	Jacksonville State	**North Dakota State**	Fargodome • Fargo, ND	CBSSN	**W** 33–7	18,537	
August 29	5:00 PM	**Hawaii**	Stanford	Stanford Stadium • Stanford, CA	ACCN	**L** 27–37	23,222	
August 29	8:00 PM	Memphis	**UNLV**	Allegiant Stadium • Paradise, NV	FOX	**L** 21–27	31,384	
^{#}Rankings from AP Poll. All times are in Mountain Time.

=== Week 1 ===
Date	Time	Visiting team	Home team	Site	TV	Result	Attendance	Ref.
September 4	4:30 PM	**San Jose State**	Eastern Michigan	Rynearson Stadium • Ypsilanti, MI	ESPN+	**W** 27–21	5,646	
September 4	6:00 PM	**UTEP**	No. 10 Oklahoma	Gaylord Family Oklahoma Memorial Stadium • Norman, OK	SECN+	**L** 0–51	84,315	
September 5	11:00 AM	Duquesne	**Air Force**	Falcon Stadium • USAF Academy, CO	MW+	**W** 34–0	26,703	
September 5	1:30 PM	Fordham	**North Dakota State**	Fargodome • Fargo, ND	MW+	**W** 38–0	15,212	
September 5	2:15 PM	**Northern Illinois**	No. 22 Iowa	Kinnick Stadium • Iowa City, IA	BTN	**L** 0–40	69,250	
September 5	4:00 PM	**Wyoming**	Colorado State	Canvas Stadium • Fort Collins, CO (Border War)	USA	**L** 13–35	40,546	
September 5	8:00 PM	Central Michigan	**New Mexico**	University Stadium • Albuquerque, NM	FS1	**W** 38–7	24,126	
September 5	8:00 PM	**UNLV**	**Hawaii**	Clarence T. C. Ching Athletics Complex • Honolulu, HI	CW	**UNLV** 21–6	15,014	
September 5	8:30 PM	Western Kentucky	**Nevada**	Mackay Stadium • Reno, NV	CBSSN	**W** 49–14	19,404	
^{#}Rankings from AP Poll. All times are in Mountain Time.

=== Week 2 ===
Date	Time	Visiting team	Home team	Site	TV	Result	Attendance	Ref.
September 12	1:45 PM	**UNLV**	North Texas	DATCU Stadium • Denton, TX	ESPNU	**L** 6–44	20,331	
September 12	2:00 PM	Northern Colorado	**Wyoming**	War Memorial Stadium • Laramie, WY	MW+	**W** 21–13	24,105	
September 12	2:00 PM	Mercyhurst	**New Mexico**	University Stadium • Albuquerque, NM	MW+	**W** 70–7	23,874	
September 12	5:00 PM	No. 5 (FCS) Illinois State	**Northern Illinois**	Huskie Stadium • DeKalb, IL	MW+	**L** 24–28	17,582	
September 12	7:00 PM	Texas Southern	**UTEP**	Sun Bowl • El Paso, TX	MW+	**W** 51–10	24,580	
September 12	7:00 PM	Cal Poly	**San Jose State**	CEFCU Stadium • San Jose, CA	MW+/NBCSBA	**W** 30–20	15,017	
September 12	8:00 PM	**North Dakota State**	**Air Force**	Falcon Stadium • USAF Academy, CO	FS1	**NDSU** 38–32	25,970	
September 12	8:30 PM	No. 1 (FCS) Montana State	**Nevada**	Mackay Stadium • Reno, NV	CW	**L** 7–20	21,679	
September 12	9:59 PM	New Mexico State	**Hawaii**	Clarence T. C. Ching Athletics Complex • Honolulu, HI	MW+	**W** 29–19	12,905	
^{#}Rankings from AP Poll. All times are in Mountain Time.

=== Week 3 ===
Date	Time	Visiting team	Home team	Site	TV	Result	Attendance	Ref.
September 19	11:00 AM	**Wyoming**	Central Michigan	Kelly/Shorts Stadium • Mount Pleasant, MI	ESPN+	**L** 10–24	15,552	
September 19	1:30 PM	**UTEP**	No. 19 Michigan	Michigan Stadium • Ann Arbor, MI	BTN	**L** 17–52	110,668	
September 19	3:00 PM	**Nevada**	Middle Tennessee	Johnny "Red" Floyd Stadium • Murfreesboro, TN	ESPN+	**L** 20–27	16,106	
September 19	5:30 PM	**New Mexico**	No. 24 Oklahoma	Gaylord Family Oklahoma Memorial Stadium • Norman, OK	ESPN2	**L** 6–14	83,423	
September 19	8:30 PM	**North Dakota State**	Sacramento State	Hornet Stadium • Sacramento, CA	ESPN	**W** 31–10	13,322	
September 19	8:30 PM	**Northern Illinois**	Arizona	Casino Del Sol Stadium • Tucson, AZ	TNT/HBO Max	**L** 17–42	40,113	
September 19	9:00 PM	Fresno State	**San Jose State**	CEFCU Stadium • San Jose, CA (Battle for the Valley)	FS1	**L** 10–26	18,256	
^{#}Rankings from AP Poll. All times are in Mountain Time.

Date	Bye Week		
September 19	Air Force	Hawaii	UNLV

=== Week 4 ===
Date	Time	Visiting team	Home team	Site	TV	Result	Attendance	Ref.
September 26	10:00 AM	**UNLV**	Akron	InfoCision Stadium • Akron, OH	ESPN+	**W** 38–10	5,607	
September 26	12:00 PM	**Northern Illinois**	Georgia State	Center Parc Stadium • Atlanta, GA	ESPN+	**L** 14–35	16,608	
September 26	1:00 PM	**Hawaii**	**Wyoming**	War Memorial Stadium • Laramie, WY (rivalry)	CW	**WYO** 27–10	20,999	
September 26	1:30 PM	**New Mexico**	New Mexico State	Aggie Memorial Stadium • Las Cruces, NM (Rio Grande Rivalry)	CBSSN	**W** 42–18	25,024	
September 26	7:00 PM	Oregon State	**UTEP**	Sun Bowl • El Paso, TX	MW+	**L** 7–33	15,099	
September 26	8:30 PM	**Air Force**	**Nevada**	Mackay Stadium • Reno, NV	FS1	**AF** 36–33 ^{2OT}	20,673	
^{#}Rankings from AP Poll. All times are in Mountain Time.

Date	Bye Week	
September 26	North Dakota State	San Jose State

=== Week 5 ===
Date	Time	Visiting team	Home team	Site	TV	Result	Attendance	Ref.
October 3	10:00 AM	Navy	**Air Force**	Falcon Stadium • USAF Academy, CO (Commander-in-Chief's Trophy)	CBS	**W** 14–9	39,441	
October 3	1:30 PM	California	**UNLV**	Allegiant Stadium • Paradise, NV	CBSSN	**W** 39–31	30,632	
October 3	1:30 PM	**Wyoming**	**North Dakota State**	Fargodome • Fargo, ND (Battle of the Basins)	CW	**NDSU** 28–0	18,586	
October 3	2:00 PM	**UTEP**	**New Mexico**	University Stadium • Albuquerque, NM	MW+	**UNM** 61–7	28,256	
October 3	10:00 PM	**San Jose State**	**Hawaii**	Clarence T. C. Ching Athletics Complex • Honolulu, HI (Dick Tomey Legacy Game)	MW+	**SJSU** 20–16	13,366	
^{#}Rankings from AP Poll. All times are in Mountain Time.

Date	Bye Week	
October 3	Nevada	Northern Illinois

=== Week 6 ===
Date	Time	Visiting team	Home team	Site	TV	Result	Attendance	Ref.
October 9	7:00 PM	**Wyoming**	**San Jose State**	CEFCU Stadium • San Jose, CA	CBSSN	**WYO** 16–13 ^{OT}	13,104	
October 10	5:00 PM	**North Dakota State**	**UNLV**	Allegiant Stadium • Paradise, NV	CW	**UNLV** 13–7	33,516	
October 10	5:00 PM	**Nevada**	**UTEP**	Sun Bowl • El Paso, TX	FS1	**NEV** 30–13	13,927	
October 10	5:30 PM	**Air Force**	**Northern Illinois**	Huskie Stadium • DeKalb, IL	CBSSN	**AF** 28–7	15,292	
October 10	8:30 PM	**Hawaii**	Arizona State	Mountain America Stadium • Tempe, AZ	FS1	**L** 12–30	47,931	
^{#}Rankings from AP Poll. All times are in Mountain Time.

Date	Bye Week
October 10	New Mexico

=== Week 7 ===
Date	Time	Visiting team	Home team	Site	TV	Result	Attendance	Ref.
October 17	1:30 PM	**Northern Illinois**	**Wyoming**	War Memorial Stadium • Laramie, WY	CW	**WYO** 41–23	20,065	
October 17	1:30 PM	**UNLV**	**Air Force**	Falcon Stadium • USAF Academy, CO	CBSSN	**AF** 41–31	23,636	
October 17	5:00 PM	**Nevada**	**North Dakota State**	Fargodome • Fargo, ND	CBSSN	**NDSU** 31–17	18,261	
October 17	7:00 PM	**San Jose State**	**UTEP**	Sun Bowl • El Paso, TX	MW+	**SJSU** 24–11	8,576	
October 17	8:30 PM	**New Mexico**	**Hawaii**	Clarence T. C. Ching Athletics Complex • Honolulu, HI	FS1	**UNM** 21–10	12,941	
^{#}Rankings from AP Poll. All times are in Mountain Time.

=== Week 8 ===
Date	Time	Visiting team	Home team	Site	TV	Result	Attendance	Ref.
October 23	7:00 PM	**Air Force**	**Wyoming**	War Memorial Stadium • Laramie, WY	CW	**WYO** 28–14	18,490	
October 24	1:30 PM	**Hawaii**	**Northern Illinois**	Huskie Stadium • DeKalb, IL	MW+	**HAW** 56–21	7,650	
October 24	3:00 PM	**San Jose State**	**Nevada**	Mackay Stadium • Reno, NV	MW+	**NEV** 28–13	17,201	
October 24	8:00 PM	**North Dakota State**	**New Mexico**	University Stadium • Albuquerque, NM	CW	**UNM** 21–16	34,794	
^{#}Rankings from AP Poll. All times are in Mountain Time.

Date	Bye Week	
October 24	UNLV	UTEP

=== Week 9 ===
Date	Time	Visiting team	Home team	Site	TV	Result	Attendance	Ref.
October 31	1:00 PM	UConn	**Air Force**	Falcon Stadium • USAF Academy, CO	MW+	**W** 35–26	20,062	
October 31	1:30 PM	**UTEP**	**North Dakota State**	Fargodome • Fargo, ND	MW+	**NDSU** 31–7	15,513	
October 31	2:00 PM	**New Mexico**	**San Jose State**	CEFCU Stadium • San Jose, CA	MW+/NBCSBA	**UNM** 21–16	9,291	
October 31	2:15 PM	**Nevada**	No. 7 UCLA	Rose Bowl • Pasadena, CA	BTN	**L** 0–27	24,611	
October 31	8:30 PM	**Northern Illinois**	**UNLV**	Allegiant Stadium • Paradise, NV	CBSSN	**UNLV** 31–24	22,382	
^{#}Rankings from AP Poll. All times are in Mountain Time.

Date	Bye Week	
October 31	Hawaii	Wyoming

=== Week 10 ===
Date	Time	Visiting team	Home team	Site	TV	Result	Attendance	Ref.
November 6	7:00 PM	No. 22 **New Mexico**	**Nevada**	Mackay Stadium • Reno, NV	CBSSN	**UNM** 31–3	15,290	
November 7	2:00 PM	**Northern Illinois**	**San Jose State**	CEFCU Stadium • San Jose, CA	MW+/NBCSCA	**SJSU** 30–19	9,786	
November 7	5:30 PM	**Air Force**	Army	Michie Stadium • West Point, NY (Commander-in-Chief's Trophy)	CBS	**W** 24–21	33,575	
November 7	7:30 PM	**Hawaii**	**UTEP**	Sun Bowl • El Paso, TX	FS1	**HAW** 17–14	8,581	
November 7	8:30 PM	**Wyoming**	**UNLV**	Allegiant Stadium • Paradise, NV	CBSSN	**WYO** 41–35	25,277	
^{#}Rankings from AP Poll. All times are in Mountain Time.

Date	Bye Week
November 7	North Dakota State

=== Week 11 ===
Date	Time	Visiting team	Home team	Site	TV	Result	Attendance	Ref.
November 14	1:30 PM	**Nevada**	**Northern Illinois**	Huskie Stadium • DeKalb, IL	MW+	**NEV** 28–7	6,354	
November 14	5:00 PM	**San Jose State**	**Air Force**	Falcon Stadium • USAF Academy, CO	CBSSN	**AF** 24–3	17,472	
November 14	5:30 PM	**UNLV**	No. 23 **New Mexico**	University Stadium • Albuquerque, NM	CW	**UNLV** 21–17	37,440	
November 14	8:00 PM	**Wyoming**	**UTEP**	Sun Bowl • El Paso, TX	FS1	**WYO** 27–15	8,334	
November 14	9:00 PM	**North Dakota State**	**Hawaii**	Clarence T. C. Ching Athletics Complex • Honolulu, HI	CW	**NDSU** 21–13	15,014	
^{#}Rankings from AP Poll. All times are in Mountain Time.

=== Week 12 ===
Date	Time	Visiting team	Home team	Site	TV	Result	Attendance	Ref.
November 20	6:00 PM	**UTEP**	**Air Force**	Falcon Stadium • USAF Academy, CO	CW	**AF** 52–3		
November 20	7:00 PM	**New Mexico**	**Wyoming**	War Memorial Stadium • Laramie, WY	FS1	**UNM** 24–17		
November 21	3:00 PM	**Northern Illinois**	**North Dakota State**	Fargodome • Fargo, ND	CW	**NDSU** 31–25		
November 21	5:00 PM	**UNLV**	**San Jose State**	CEFCU Stadium • San Jose, CA	CBSSN	**UNLV** 24–22		
November 21	8:30 PM	**Hawaii**	**Nevada**	Mackay Stadium • Reno, NV	FS1	**NEV** 16–8		
^{#}Rankings from AP Poll. All times are in Mountain Time.

=== Week 13 ===
Date	Time	Visiting team	Home team	Site	TV	Result	Attendance	Ref.
November 27	1:30 PM	**North Dakota State**	San Jose State	CEFCU Stadium • San Jose, CA	CBSSN			
November 27	2:30 PM	**Air Force**	New Mexico	University Stadium • Albuquerque, NM	CW			
November 28	10:00 AM	UConn	Wyoming	War Memorial Stadium • Laramie, WY	FS1			
November 28	1:30 PM	**UTEP**	Northern Illinois	Huskie Stadium • DeKalb, IL	MW+			
November 28	7:00 PM	**Nevada**	UNLV	Allegiant Stadium • Paradise, NV (Fremont Cannon)	CBSSN			
November 28	9:00 PM	Sacramento State	Hawaii	Clarence T. C. Ching Athletics Complex • Honolulu, HI	MW+			
^{#}Rankings from AP Poll. All times are in Mountain Time.

North Dakota State and San Jose State will play as non-conference opponents

== Mountain West records vs. other conferences ==
2026–27 records against non-conference foes:

Regular season

Power Four Conferences	Record
ACC	1–1
Big 12	0–2
Big Ten	0–4
Notre Dame	0–0
SEC	0–2
Power 4 Total	1–9
Other FBS Conferences	Record
American	2–2
CUSA	4–1
Independents (Excluding Notre Dame)	1–0
MAC	4–1
Pac-12	0–3
Sun Belt	1–0
Other FBS Total	11–8
FCS Opponents	Record
Football Championship Subdivision	6–2
Total Non-Conference Record	18–19

=== Mountain West vs Power 4 matchups ===
This is a list of games the Mountain West has scheduled versus power conference teams (ACC, Big Ten, Big 12, Notre Dame and SEC). All rankings are from the current AP Poll at the time of the game.

Date	Conference	Visitor	Home	Site	Score
August 29	ACC	Hawaii	Stanford	Stanford Stadium • Stanford, CA	L 27–37
August 29	Big Ten	San Jose State	No. 14t USC	Los Angeles Memorial Coliseum • Los Angeles, CA	L 26–42
September 4	SEC	UTEP	No. 10 Oklahoma	Gaylord Family Oklahoma Memorial Stadium • Norman, OK	L 0–51
September 5	Big Ten	Northern Illinois	No. 22 Iowa	Kinnick Stadium • Iowa City, IA	L 0–40
September 19	SEC	New Mexico	Oklahoma	Gaylord Family Oklahoma Memorial Stadium • Norman, OK	L 6–14
September 19	Big 12	Northern Illinois	Arizona	Casino Del Sol Stadium • Tucson, AZ	L 17–42
September 19	Big Ten	UTEP	Michigan	Michigan Stadium • Ann Arbor, MI	L 17–52
October 3	ACC	California	UNLV	Allegiant Stadium • Paradise, NV	W 39–31
October 10	Big 12	Hawaii	Arizona State	Mountain America Stadium • Tempe, AZ	L 12–30
October 31	Big Ten	Nevada	No. 7 UCLA	Rose Bowl • Pasadena, CA	L 0–27

=== Mountain West vs. other FBS matchups ===
The following games include Mountain West teams competing against teams from the American, CUSA, MAC, Pac-12 or Sun Belt.

Date	Conference	Visitor	Home	Site	Score
August 29	C-USA	Jacksonville State	North Dakota State	Fargodome • Fargo, ND	W 33–7
August 29	American	Memphis	UNLV	Allegiant Stadium • Paradise, NV	L 21–27
September 4	MAC	San Jose State	Eastern Michigan	Rynearson Stadium • Ypsilanti, MI	W 27–21
September 5	C-USA	Western Kentucky	Nevada	Mackay Stadium • Reno, NV	W 49–14
September 5	MAC	Central Michigan	New Mexico	University Stadium • Albuquerque, NM	W 38–7
September 5	Pac-12	Wyoming	Colorado State	Canvas Stadium • Fort Collins, CO	L 13–35
September 12	C-USA	New Mexico State	Hawaii	Clarence T. C. Ching Athletics Complex • Honolulu, HI	W 29–19
September 12	American	UNLV	North Texas	DATCU Stadium • Denton, TX	L 6–44
September 19	C-USA	Nevada	Middle Tennessee State	Johnny "Red" Floyd Stadium • Murfreesboro, TN	L 20–27
September 19	MAC	North Dakota State	Sacramento State	Hornet Stadium • Sacramento, CA	W 31–10
September 19	Pac-12	Fresno State	San Jose State	CEFCU Stadium • San Jose, CA	L 10–26
September 19	MAC	Wyoming	Central Michigan	Kelly/Shorts Stadium • Mount Pleasant, MI	L 10–24
September 26	C-USA	New Mexico	New Mexico State	Aggie Memorial Stadium • Las Cruces, NM	W 42–18
September 26	MAC	UNLV	Akron	InfoCision Stadium • Akron, OH	W 38–10
September 26	Sun Belt	Northern Illinois	Georgia State	Center Parc • Atlanta, GA	L 14–35
September 26	Pac-12	Oregon State	UTEP	Sun Bowl • El Paso, TX	L 7–33
October 3	American	Navy	Air Force	Falcon Stadium • USAF Academy, CO	W 14–9
November 7	American	Air Force	Army	Michie Stadium • West Point, NY	W 24–21
November 28	MAC	Sacramento State	Hawaii	Clarence T. C. Ching Athletics Complex • Honolulu, HI	

=== Mountain West vs FBS independents ===
The following games include Mountain West teams competing against FBS Independents, which only includes UConn for 2026.

Date	Visitor	Home	Site	Score
October 31	UConn	Air Force	Falcon Stadium • USAF Academy, CO	W 35–26
November 28	UConn	Wyoming	War Memorial Stadium • Laramie, WY	

=== Mountain West vs FCS matchups ===
The following games include Mountain West teams competing against FCS schools.

Date	Conference	Visitor	Home	Site	Score
September 5	Northeast	Duquesne	Air Force	Falcon Stadium • USAF Academy, CO	W 34–0
September 5	Patriot	Fordham	North Dakota State	Fargodome • Fargo, ND	W 38–0
September 12	Big Sky	Montana State	Nevada	Mackay Stadium • Reno, NV	L 7–20
September 12	Northeast	Mercyhurst	New Mexico	University Stadium • Albuquerque, NM	W 70–7
September 12	MVFC	Illinois State	Northern Illinois	Huskie Stadium • DeKalb, IL	L 24–28
September 12	Big Sky	Cal Poly	San Jose State	CEFCU Stadium • San Jose, CA	W 30–20
September 12	SWAC	Texas Southern	UTEP	Sun Bowl • El Paso, TX	W 51–10
September 12	Big Sky	Northern Colorado	Wyoming	War Memorial Stadium • Laramie, WY	W 21–13

== Awards and honors ==
=== Player of the week honors ===
Week	Offensive			Defensive			Special Teams			Freshman		
Week	Player	Team	Position	Player	Team	Position	Player	Team	Position	Player	Team	Position
Week 0	Nathan Hayes	North Dakota State	QB	Donovan Woolen	North Dakota State	LB	Drew Klein	North Dakota State	PK	Blake Schiltz	North Dakota State	DE
Week 1	Dominic Kelley	Nevada	RB	Tre Fulton	UNLV	S	Trajan Sinatra	San Jose State	PK	Kal-El Togafau	UNLV	DE
Week 2	Nathan Hayes (2)	North Dakota State	QB	Jamih Otis	Hawaii	LB	Drew Klein (2)	North Dakota State	PK	Myles Mitchell	North Dakota State	RB
Week 3	Jackson Williams	North Dakota State	WR	Darius Givance	North Dakota State	S	Grant Glasgow	New Mexico	PK	Gavin Sell	North Dakota State	LB
Week 4	Liam Szarka	Air Force	QB	Cam Santee	UNLV	LB	Joe McFadden	Nevada	PK	Toa Fa'avae	New Mexico	QB
Week 5	Jackson Arnold	UNLV	QB	Donovan Woolen (2)	North Dakota State	LB	Austin Brawley	New Mexico	S	Toa Fa'avae (2)	New Mexico	QB
Week 6	Herschel Turner	Nevada	RB	Andre Porter	UNLV	DE	Erik Sandvik	Wyoming	PK	Kal-El Togafau (2)	UNLV	DE
Week 7	Tyler Hughes	Wyoming	QB	Darren Agu	New Mexico	DE	Jackson Williams	North Dakota State	RS	Marion Moore	North Dakota State	CB
Week 8	Micah Alejado	Hawaii	QB	Austin Brawley	New Mexico	S	Ky Woods	Nevada	RS	Steven Perez	Wyoming	LB
Week 9	Kemper Hodges	Air Force	QB	Darren Agu (2)	New Mexico	DE	Will Duncan	Air Force	P	Marion Moore (2)	North Dakota State	CB
Week 10	Samuel Harris	Wyoming	QB	Tyson Shamsid-Deen	Wyoming	CB	Erik Sandvik	Wyoming	PK	Titan Lacaden	Hawaii	WR
Week 11	Jackson Arnold (2)	UNLV	QB	Ray James Jr.	North Dakota State	LB	Matthew Choules	UNLV	P	Matthew Choules	UNLV	P

== Home attendance ==
Team	Stadium	Capacity	Game 1	Game 2	Game 3	Game 4	Game 5	Game 6	Game 7	Total	Average	% of capacity
Air Force	Falcon Stadium	39,441	26,703	25,970	30,441†	23,636	20,062	17,472		144,284	24,047	61.0%
Hawaii	Clarence T. C. Ching Athletics Complex	15,194	15,014†	12,905	13,366	12,941	15,014			69,240	13,848	91.1%
Nevada	Mackay Stadium	27,000	19,404	21,679†	20,673	17,201	15,290			94,247	18,849	69.8%
New Mexico	University Stadium	39,224	24,126	23,874	20,673	28,256	34,794	37,440†		169,163	28,193	71.9%
North Dakota State	Fargodome	18,700	18,537	15,212	18,586†	18,261	15,513			86,109	17,221	92.1%
Northern Illinois	Huskie Stadium	28,211	17,582†	15,292	7,650	6,354				46,878	11,719	41.5%
San Jose State	CEFCU Stadium	18,203	15,017	**18,256**†	13,104	9,291	9,786			65,454	13,090	71.9%
UNLV	Allegiant Stadium	65,000	31,384	30,632	33,516†	22,382	25,277			143,191	28,638	44.1%
UTEP	Sun Bowl	45,971	24,580†	15,099	13,927	8,576	8,581	8,334		76,097	12,682	27.6%
Wyoming	War Memorial Stadium	29,811	24,105†	20,999	20,065	18,490				83,659	20,914	70.2%

Bold - Exceed or met capacity
†Season High
