= 2026 San Jose State Spartans football team =

American college football season

2026 San Jose State Spartans football
- Conference: Mountain West Conference
- Record: 5–7 (3–5 MW)
- Head coach: Ken Niumatalolo (3rd season)
- Offensive coordinator: Craig Stutzmann (3rd season)
- Offensive scheme: Spread-N-Shred
- Defensive coordinator: Bojay Filimoeatu (1st season)
- Base defense: 3–4
- Home stadium: CEFCU Stadium

Uniform
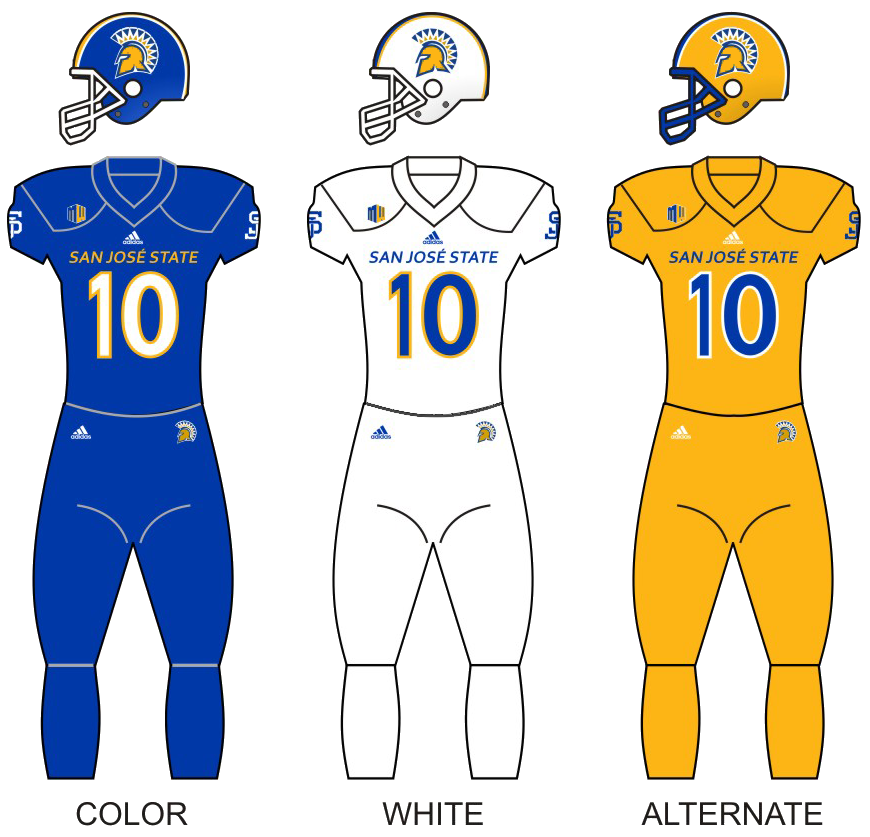

2026 Mountain West Conference football standings
	Conf.			Overall
Team	W		L	W		L
New Mexico	6	–	1	9	–	2
North Dakota State	6	–	2	9	–	2
Wyoming	6	–	2	7	–	4
Air Force	5	–	2	9	–	2
UNLV	5	–	2	7	–	4
Nevada	4	–	3	5	–	6
San Jose State	3	–	5	5	–	7
Hawaii	2	–	6	3	–	8
UTEP	0	–	7	1	–	10
Northern Illinois	0	–	7	0	–	11
Championship: December 4, 2026
As of November 22, 2026; Rankings from CFP rankings

The 2026 San Jose State Spartans football team represents San Jose State University as a member of the Mountain West Conference (MW) during the 2026 NCAA Division I FBS football season. The Spartans are led by head coach Ken Niumatalolo in his third year, with Craig Stutzmann at offensive coordinator and Bojay Filimoeatu at defensive coordinator. They play home games at CEFCU Stadium in San Jose, California.

On February 25, 2026, the San Jose State Spartans announced a 13-game regular-season schedule, the most games scheduled by an FBS team during the 2026 season. Under the NCAA's exemption, teams that play a game in Hawaii are permitted to schedule an additional regular-season game to offset travel costs. It is San Jose State's first 13-game regular season since 2017.

== Offseason ==
=== Departures ===
==== Outgoing transfers ====
Player	Position	Destination
Nate Hale	OT	Arizona
Danny Scudero	WR	Colorado
Vili Taufatofua	EDGE	Colorado
Caleb Presley	CB	Colorado State
Walker Eget	QB	Duke
JT Taylor	CB	Eastern Washington
Denaris DeRosa Jr.	IOL	Hawaii
Larry Turner-Gooden	S	Nevada
Matthew Coleman	WR	Sacramento State
Leland Smith	WR	UCLA
Steve Chavez-Soto	RB	Utah
Jireh Moe	DL	Utah
Kyri Shoels	WR	Utah
Jaylen Thomas	CB	Washington State
Joseph Bey	S	Unknown
Noah McNeal-Franklin	LB	Unknown
Isiah Revis	S	Unknown
Tangata Tuitupou	DL	Unknown

==== Coaching departures ====
Name	Previous Position	New Position
Greg Burns	San Jose State - Cornerbacks coach	Washington State - Defensive backs coach
John Estes	San Jose State - Offensive line coach	St. Louis Battlehawks - Running backs coach

=== Acquisitions ===
==== Incoming transfers ====
Player	Position	Previous School
Ian Shewell	DL	Arizona State
Dominique McKenzie	WR	BYU
Ikinasio Tupou	OT	BYU
Agenhart Ellis IV	S	Cal Lutheran
Brian Dukes Jr.	S	Cal Poly
Luke Weaver	QB	Hawaii
Trajan Sinatra	K	Idaho State
Jonathan Watts	S	Idaho State
Dylan Aguilera	LS	Lafayette
Brian Tapu	OT	Nebraska
Jackson Barton	S	Nevada
Anthony Ivey	WR	Penn State
Pierce Walker	S	Portland State
Lavaka Taukeiaho	IOL	Oklahoma State
Isaiah Buxton	CB	San Diego State
Jerry McClure	WR	San Diego State
Jeremiah Tuiileila	EDGE	San Diego State
Jordan Anderson	WR	Sacramento State
Jayland McGlothen	DL	Sacramento State
Isaiah Carlson	RB	UCLA
Aizik Mahuka	LB	Weber State
Tyler Jacklich	RB	West Virginia

==== Coaches acquisitions and promotions ====
Name	Previous Position	New Position
Kolney Cassel	San Jose State - Offensive analyst	San Jose State - Tight ends coach
Joe Dale	Weber State - Defensive coordinator	San Jose State - Safeties coach
Bojay Filimoeatu	San Jose State - Interim defensive coordinator	San Jose State - Defensive coordinator
Ramsen Golpashin	UCLA - Senior defensive analyst	San Jose State - Offensive line coach
Fred Guidici	Stanford - Senior special teams quality control analyst	San Jose State - Special teams analyst
Brian Norwood	TCU - Safeties coach	San Jose State - Defensive pass game coordinator & cornerbacks coach

== Schedule ==
Date	Time	Opponent	Site	TV	Result	Attendance
August 29	12:00 p.m.	at No. 14т USC*	Los Angeles Memorial Coliseum; Los Angeles, CA	NBC	L 26–42	51,144
September 4	3:30 p.m.	at Eastern Michigan*	Rynearson Stadium; Ypsilanti, MI	ESPN+	W 27–21	5,646
September 12	6:00 p.m.	Cal Poly*	CEFCU Stadium; San Jose, CA	MW+/NBCSBA	W 30–20	15,017
September 19	8:00 p.m.	Fresno State*	CEFCU Stadium; San Jose, CA (Battle for the Valley)	FS1	L 10–26	18,256
October 3	9:00 p.m.	at Hawaii	Clarence T. C. Ching Athletics Complex; Honolulu, HI (Dick Tomey Legacy Game)	MW+	W 20–16	13,366
October 9	6:00 p.m.	Wyoming	CEFCU Stadium; San Jose, CA	CBSSN	L 13–16 ^{OT}	13,104
October 17	6:00 p.m.	at UTEP	Sun Bowl; El Paso, TX	MW+	W 24–11	8,576
October 24	2:00 p.m.	at Nevada	Mackay Stadium; Reno, NV	MW+	L 13–28	17,201
October 31	1:00 p.m.	New Mexico	CEFCU Stadium; San Jose, CA	MW+/NBCSBA	L 16–21	9,291
November 7	1:00 p.m.	Northern Illinois	CEFCU Stadium; San Jose, CA	MW+/NBCSCA	W 30–19	9,786
November 14	4:00 p.m.	at Air Force	Falcon Stadium; Colorado Springs, CO	CBSSN	L 3–24	
November 21	4:00 p.m.	UNLV	CEFCU Stadium; San Jose, CA	CBSSN	L 22–24	8,187
November 27	12:30 p.m.	North Dakota State*	CEFCU Stadium; San Jose, CA	CBSSN		
*Non-conference game; Rankings from AP Poll (and CFP Rankings, after November 4) - Released prior to game; All times are in Pacific time

== Roster ==
2026 San Jose State Spartans football team roster
Players
Coaches
Offense

Pos.	#	Name	Class
WR	0	Jordan Anderson	So
WR	1	Carson Clark	Fr
WR	2	Jerry McClure	Jr
QB	3	Luke Weaver	Sr
WR	4	Dominique McKenzie	So
QB	5	Daniel Rolovich	Fr
RB	6	Jabari Bates	Sr
WR	7	Tama Amisone	So
QB	8	Robert McDaniel	Fr
WR	9	Jase Nix	Fr
WR	10	Anthony Ivey	Sr
WR	11	Malachi Riley	Jr
WR	13	Cooper Hoch	Jr
QB	14	Hudson Wyatt	Jr
QB	16	C. J. Lee	So
WR	17	Ryker Ruelas	Fr
WR	18	Trace Hernandez	So
WR	19	Cody Hall	Sr
RB	20	Viliami Teu	Jr
RB	21	Isaiah Carlson	Jr
RB	22	Tyler Jacklich	Jr
WR	23	Devin Olmande	Fr
RB	24	Sir Autry	Fr
RB	26	Courshawn Hill	Fr
RB	28	Aaron Cox Jr.	Fr
WR	33	Parris Vernon Jr.	Fr
OL	54	Daniel Moleni	Sr
OL	55	Greg Shade	So
OL	56	Simeon Afalava	Sr
OL	62	Tyler Chen	Jr
OL	63	Brian Tapu	Fr
OL	64	Nathan Balestrieri	Jr
OL	65	Johnny Notarianni	Fr
OL	66	Kamuela Wilhelm	Fr
OL	67	Keenan Parks	Fr
OL	68	Mitchell Brown	So
OL	69	Uluakinofo Taliauli	Fr
OL	70	Ikinasio Tupou	So
OL	72	Lavaka Taukeiaho	Sr
OL	74	Mitchell Jones	So
OL	75	Joseph Harbert	Sr
OL	76	Manuel Serna	So
OL	77	Daniel Tuliau	Fr
OL	78	David Perez	So
WR	80	Jeremiah Fung	Fr
TE	82	Braiden Bachich-Dixon	Fr
TE	83	Kamaehu Kopa-Kaawahauole	Jr
TE	84	Max Friedman	So
TE	85	Shane Kiley	Fr
TE	88	Ryan Boultwood	Jr

Defense

Pos.	#	Name	Class
CB	0	Isaiah Buxton	So
S	1	Brian Dukes Jr.	Sr
S	2	Maliki Crawford	Jr
LB	3	Naseri Danielson	Jr
LB	4	Dylan Lee	Jr
CB	5	Kejuan Bullard Jr.	Sr
LB	6	Ethan Powell	Sr
LB	7	Aizik Mahuna	Jr
CB	8	Runye Norton	Sr
CB	10	Greco Carillo	So
LB	11	Champ Kapanui	Fr
CB	12	Francois Jones Jr.	Jr
S	13	Pierce Walker	So
CB	14	Jayden Robertson	Jr
LB	15	Skyler Tiatia	Fr
LB	16	Luke Richey	So
LB	19	Cayden Woolwine	So
S	21	Charles Cox III	Sr
CB	22	Jonathan Watts	So
S	23	Nassir Pitters	Jr
LB	24	Malakai Hoeft	Sr
LB	25	Zane Carter	Jr
LB	26	Viliami Lotoaniu	Fr
LB	27	Jackson Barton	So
CB	28	Cole Gohlar	Fr
S	31	Hunter Nowell	Jr
CB	32	Caleb Womack	Sr
S	39	Tuli Tagovailoa-Amosa	So
LB	40	Blake Tabaracci	So
DL	41	Bronx Letuligasenoa	Fr
DL	42	Ian Shewell	Sr
DL	45	Jeremiah Tuiileila	Fr
DL	48	Dejon Roney	Sr
DL	50	Star Taimani	So
DL	51	Solomone Langi	Sr
LB	53	Brady Van Bennekum	Jr
LB	56	Sirr Bible	Fr
DL	57	Justin Stearns	Sr
DL	89	Etu Finau	Sr
DL	90	Jayland McGlothen	Jr
DL	91	Auma Jennings	Fr
DL	92	Noa Siaosi	Jr
DL	94	Russell Devany	Fr
DL	95	Colton Thomas	Fr
DL	97	John Norwood	Sr
DL	99	Nate Lewis	Sr

Special teams

Pos.	#	Name	Class
K/P	29	Joey Fernandez	Jr
LS	30	Jaelen Nichols	Jr
K	36	Trajan Sintra	Jr
LS	44	Dylan Aguilera	Sr
LS	46	Sam Cowart	So
P	49	Trent Carrizosa	Sr
K	99	Mathias Brown	Jr

Head coach

- Ken Niumatalolo

Coordinators/assistant coaches

- Craig Stutzmann – Offensive coordinator/quarterbacks
- Bojay Filimoeatu – Defensive coordinator
- Al Lapuaho – Defensive run game coordinator/defensive linemen
- Brian Norwood – Defensive pass game coordinator/defensive backs
- Billy Ray Stutzmann – Offensive pass game coordinator/wide receivers
- Kolney Cassel – Tight ends
- Joe Dale – Safeties
- Ramsen Golpashin – Offensive linemen
- Josh Irvin – Outside linebackers
- Michael Smith – Running backs
- Nu'u Tafisi – Director, Athletic Performance
- Zach Artman – Offensive analyst
- Fred Guidici – Special teams analyst
- Aaron Angelos – Graduate assistant
- Dylan Cunningham – Graduate assistant
- Nick Meyer – Graduate assistant

Legend

- (C) Team captain
- (S) Suspended
- (I) Ineligible
- Injured
- Redshirt

Roster
Last update: 8/31/26

== Game summaries ==
=== at No. 14_{T} USC ===
San Jose State Spartans (0–0) at No. 14т USC Trojans (0–0) – Game summary

Quarter	1	2	3	4	Total
Spartans	0	0	3	23	26
No. 14т Trojans	7	21	7	7	42

at Los Angeles Memorial Coliseum • Los Angeles, California

- Date: August 29
- Game time: 12:00 PM PDT
- Game weather: Sunny • Temperature: 94 °F (34 °C)
- Game attendance: 51,144
- Referee: Jim Wharrie
- TV announcers (NBC): Noah Eagle (play-by-play), Todd Blackledge (analyst), and Kathryn Tappen (sideline reporter)

Game information

First quarter

- (8:55) USC - Jayden Maiava 1-yard run (Chaden Chittenden kick) (Drive: 13 plays, 77 yards, 6:05; USC 7–0)

Second quarter

- (14:20) USC - Riley Wormley 5-yard run (Chaden Chittenden kick), (Drive: 8 plays, 43 yards, 3:46; USC 14–0)
- (2:46) USC - Kayden Dixon-Wyatt 9-yard pass from Jayden Maiava (Chaden Chittenden kick), (Drive: 12 plays, 91 yards, 5:35; USC 21–0)
- (0:30) - King Miller 4-yard run (Chaden Chittenden kick), (Drive: 6 plays, 80 yards, 1:14; USC 28–0)

Third quarter

- (7:15) SJSU - Trajan Sinatra 22-yard field goal (Drive: 9 plays, 69 yards, 3:17; USC 28–3)
- (2:28) USC - Trent Mosley 14-yard pass from Jayden Maiava (Chaden Chittenden kick), (Drive: 9 plays, 74 yards, 4:41; USC 35–3)

Fourth quarter

- (14:56) SJSU - Jerry McClure 28-yard pass from Luke Weaver (Luke Weaver–Kamaehu Kopa-Kaawalauole pass), (Drive: 5 plays, 68 yards, 2:26; USC 35–11)
- (9:42) USC - Shana Alston 1-yard run (Chaden Chittenden kick), (Drive: 10 plays, 75 yards, 5:14; USC 42–11)
- (5:11) SJSU - Jordan Anderson 3-yard pass from Luke Weaver (Trajan Sinatra kick), (Drive: 10 plays, 75 yards, 4:31; USC 42–18)
- (1:45) SJSU - Luke Weaver 7-yard run (Luke Weaver–Cooper Hoch pass), (Drive: 3 Plays, 35 yards, 0:39; USC 42–26)

Statistics	SJSU	USC
First downs	19	29
Plays–yards	56–336	76–505
Rushes–yards	24–102	40–164
Passing yards	234	341
Passing: comp–att–int	21–32–0	30–36–1
Turnovers	0	1
Time of possession	22:45	37:15

Team	Category	Player	Statistics
San Jose State	Passing	Luke Weaver	21/32, 234 yards, 2 TD
San Jose State	Rushing	Luke Weaver	8 carries, 42 yards, TD
San Jose State	Receiving	Carson Clark	6 receptions, 74 yards
USC	Passing	Jayden Maiava	25/29, 286 yards, 2 TD
USC	Rushing	King Miller	15 carries, 63 yards, TD
USC	Receiving	Tyron Mosley	7 receptions, 118 yards, TD

=== at Eastern Michigan ===
San Jose State Spartans (0–1) at Eastern Michigan Eagles (1–0) – Game summary

Quarter	1	2	3	4	Total
Spartans	0	10	7	10	27
Eagles	0	7	14	0	21

at Rynearson Stadium • Ypsilanti, MI

- Date: September 4, 2026
- Game time: 3:30 PM PDT
- Game weather: Cloudy • Temperature: 75 °F (24 °C) • Wind: NW 5 mph
- Game attendance: 5,646
- Referee: Rich Edwards
- TV announcers (ESPN+): Evan Stockton and Marcus Ray

Game information

First quarter

- No scoring plays.

Second quarter

- EMU – Harold Mack 5-yard pass from Noah Kim (Rudy Kessinger kick), 9:19. Eagles 7–0. Drive: 6 plays, 58 yards, 3:06.
- SJSU – Jase Nix 27-yard pass from Luke Weaver (Trajan Sinatra kick), 1:19. Tied 7–7. Drive: 4 plays, 80 yards, 0:28.
- SJSU – Trajan Sinatra 45-yard field goal, 0:00. Spartans 10–7. Drive: 7 plays, 37 yards, 0:48.

Third quarter

- EMU – Amareon Blue 50-yard run (Rudy Kessinger kick), 11:52. Eagles 14–10. Drive: 7 plays, 75 yards, 3:08.
- SJSU – Cooper Hoch 10-yard pass from Luke Weaver (Trajan Sinatra kick), 6:08. Spartans 17–14. Drive: 13 plays, 75 yards, 5:45.
- EMU – Bryce Llewellyn 1-yard fumble return (Rudy Kessinger kick), 0:53. Eagles 21–17.

Fourth quarter

- SJSU – Cooper Hoch 40-yard pass from Luke Weaver (Trajan Sinatra kick), 11:19. Spartans 24–21. Drive: 5 plays, 70 yards, 1:51.
- SJSU – Trajan Sinatra 49-yard field goal, 1:37. Spartans 27–21. Drive: 4 plays, -5 yards, 0:18.

Statistics	SJSU	EMU
First downs	19	13
Plays–yards	77–453	68–281
Rushes–yards	36–137	25–107
Passing yards	316	174
Passing: comp–att–int	23–41–1	24–43–1
Turnovers	2	1
Time of possession	29:52	30:08

Team	Category	Player	Statistics
San Jose State	Passing	Luke Weaver	23/39, 316 yards, 3 TD, INT
San Jose State	Rushing	Jabari Bates	20 carries, 119 yards
San Jose State	Receiving	Cooper Hoch	5 receptions, 115 yards, 2 TD
Eastern Michigan	Passing	Noah Kim	24/43, 174 yards, TD, INT
Eastern Michigan	Rushing	Amareon Blue	11 carries, 81 yards, TD
Eastern Michigan	Receiving	Harold Mack	7 receptions, 72 yards, TD

=== Cal Poly (FCS) ===
Cal Poly Mustangs (FCS) (2–0) at San Jose State Spartans (1–1) – Game summary

Quarter	1	2	3	4	Total
Mustangs (FCS)	0	6	7	7	20
Spartans	0	13	7	10	30

at CEFCU Stadium • San Jose, CA

- Date: September 12, 2026
- Game time: 6:00 PM PDT
- Game weather: Sunny • Temperature: 72 °F (22 °C) • Wind: NW 15 mph
- Game attendance: 15,017
- Referee: Douglas Mercer
- TV announcers (MW+/NBCSBA): Neal Ruhl, James Jones and Lindsey Pallares

Game information

First quarter

- No scoring plays.

Second quarter

- CP – Fidel Pitts 2-yard run (Josue Lopez kick failed), 14:03. Mustangs 6–0. Drive: 11 plays, 75 yards, 4:44.
- SJSU – Carson Clark 5-yard pass from Luke Weaver (Trajan Sinatra kick), 11:43. Spartans 7–6. Drive: 6 plays, 75 yards, 2:15.
- SJSU – Trajan Sinatra 44-yard field goal, 5:07. Spartans 10–6. Drive: 10 plays, 39 yards, 4:59.
- SJSU – Trajan Sinatra 32-yard field goal, 0:02. Spartans 13–6. Drive: 15 plays, 57 yards, 3:09.

Third quarter

- CP – Jaden Green 6-yard pass from Anthony Grigsby Jr. (Josue Lopez kick), 12:41. Tied 13–13. Drive: 5 plays, 65 yards, 2:19.
- SJSU – Cooper Hoch 2-yard pass from Luke Weaver (Trajan Sinatra kick), 4:29. Spartans 20–13. Drive: 10 plays, 49 yards, 3:30.

Fourth quarter

- CP – Misa Paiau 1-yard run (Josue Lopez kick), 14:29. Tied 20–20. Drive: 12 plays, 80 yards, 4:54.
- SJSU – Trajan Sinatra 40-yard field goal, 11:59. Spartans 23–20. Drive: 6 plays, 21 yards, 2:23.
- SJSU – Carson Clark 41-yard pass from Luke Weaver (Trajan Sinatra kick), 7:20. Spartans 30–20. Drive: 6 plays, 80 yards, 2:54.

Statistics	CP	SJSU
First downs	20	27
Plays–yards	69–340	78–493
Rushes–yards	29–91	44–255
Passing yards	249	238
Passing: comp–att–int	24–40–2	22–34–0
Turnovers	2	1
Time of possession	28:58	32:02

Team	Category	Player	Statistics
Cal Poly	Passing	Anthony Grigsby Jr.	24/40, 249 yards, TD, 2 INT
Cal Poly	Rushing	Jaden Green	10 carries, 52 yards
Cal Poly	Receiving	Fidel Pitts	5 receptions, 103 yards
San Jose State	Passing	Luke Weaver	22/34, 238 yards, 3 TD
San Jose State	Rushing	Jabari Bates	27 carries, 163 yards
San Jose State	Receiving	Carson Clark	8 receptions, 81 yards, 2 TD

=== Fresno State (Battle for the Valley) ===
Fresno State Bulldogs (1–1) at San Jose State Spartans (2–1) – Game summary

Quarter	1	2	3	4	Total
Bulldogs	0	6	7	13	26
Spartans	3	0	0	7	10

at CEFCU Stadium • San Jose, California

- Date: September 19
- Game time: 8:00 p.m.
- Game weather: Clear • Temperature: 65 °F (18 °C) • Wind: NW 10 mph
- Game attendance: 18,256
- Referee: Brad Carrell
- TV announcers (FS1): Carlo Jiménez and Petros Papadakis

Game information

First quarter

- (9:25) SJSU - Trajan Sinatra 45-yard field goal, (Drive: 8 plays, 40 yards, 3:33; San Jose State 3-0)

Second quarter

- (11:44) FRES - Manake Watanabe 52-yard field goal, (Drive: 5 plays, 17 yards, 1:20; Tied 3-3)
- (0:50) FRES - Manake Watanabe 51-yard field goal, (Drive: 5 plays, 32 yards, 0:46; Fresno State 6-3)

Third quarter

- (12:00) FRES - Josiah Freeman 18-yard pass from Jayden Mandal (Manaki Watanabe kick), (Drive: 2 plays, 14 yards, 1:03; Fresno State 13-3)

Fourth quarter

- (12:40) SJSU - Carson Clark 1-yard pass from Luke Weaver (Trajan Sinatra kick), (Drive: 15 plays, 92 yards, 6:11; Fresno State 13-10)
- (6:38) FRES - Manake Watanabe 44-yard field goal, (Drive: 11 plays, 60 yards, 5:52; Fresno State 16-10)
- (1:57) FRES - Manake Watanabe 40-yard field goal, (Drive: 4 plays, 4 yards, 1:34; Fresno State 19-10)
- (1:17) FRES - Bryson Donelson 36-yard run (Manaki Watanabe kick), (Drive: 2 plays, 39 yards, 0:13; Fresno State 26-10)

Statistics	FRES	SJSU
First downs	16	13
Plays–yards	68–354	70–335
Rushes–yards	39–168	32–191
Passing yards	186	244
Passing: comp–att–int	15–19–0	21–38–4
Time of possession	33:52	26:08

Team	Category	Player	Statistics
Fresno State	Passing	Jayden Mandal	15/29, 186 yards, TD
Fresno State	Rushing	Bryson Donelson	9 carries, 60 yards, TD
Fresno State	Receiving	Josiah Freeman	6 receptions, 95 yards, TD
San Jose State	Passing	Luke Weaver	21/38, 244 yards, TD, 4 INT
San Jose State	Rushing	Jabari Bates	19 carries, 94 yards
San Jose State	Receiving	Anthony Ivey	7 receptions, 150 yards

=== at Hawaii (Dick Tomey Legacy Game) ===
San Jose State Spartans (2–2) at Hawaii Rainbow Warriors (1–3) – Game summary

Quarter	1	2	3	4	Total
Spartans	0	14	3	3	20
Rainbow Warriors	0	0	13	3	16

at Clarence T. C. Ching Athletics Complex • Honolulu, Hawaii

- Date: October 3, 2026
- Game time: 5:59 p.m.
- Game weather: 80 °F (27 °C)
- Referee: Cal McNeill
- TV announcers (KFVE): Kanoa Leahey (play-by-play), Rich Miano (analyst), Cienna Pilotin and Kyle Chinen (sideline reporters)
- Box score

Game information

Second quarter

- SJSU – Kamaehu Kopa-Kaawalauole 10-yard pass from Luke Weaver (Trajan Sinatra kick), 12:01. 3 plays, 20 yards, 1:04. Spartans 7–0.
- SJSU – Carson Clark 12-yard pass from Luke Weaver (Trajan Sinatra kick), 6:08. 7 plays, 73 yards, 2:56. Spartans 14–0.

Third quarter

- HAW – Sean Olvera-Harle 44-yard field goal, 11:46. 6 plays, 49 yards, 3:14. Spartans 14–3.
- HAW – Sean Olvera-Harle 24-yard field goal, 5:14. 11 plays, 79 yards, 4:40. Spartans 14–6.
- HAW – Devin Alves 58-yard pass from Micah Alejado (Sean Olvera-Harle kick), 3:20. 2 plays, 61 yards, 0:52. Spartans 14–13.
- SJSU – Trajan Sinatra 24-yard field goal, 0:24. 7 plays, 68 yards, 2:56. Spartans 17–13.

Fourth quarter

- HAW – Sean Olvera-Harle 44-yard field goal, 11:52. 8 plays, 49 yards, 3:32. Spartans 17–16.
- SJSU – Trajan Sinatra 30-yard field goal, 1:15. 12 plays, 26 yards, 5:31. Spartans 20–16.

Statistics	SJSU	HAW
First downs	16	18
Plays–yards	62–324	68–438
Rushes–yards	34–78	25–97
Passing yards	246	341
Passing: Comp–Att–Int	19–28–0	23–38–2
Turnovers	0	2
Time of possession	29:59	30:01

Team	Category	Player	Statistics
San Jose State	Passing	Luke Weaver	19/28, 246 yards, 2 TD
San Jose State	Rushing	Jabari Bates	27 carries, 74 yards
San Jose State	Receiving	Carson Clark	5 receptions, 74 yards, TD
Hawaii	Passing	Micah Alejado	23/35, 341 yards, TD, 2 INT
Hawaii	Rushing	Micah Alejado	12 carries, 36 yards
Hawaii	Receiving	Devin Alves	3 receptions, 121 yards, TD

=== Wyoming ===
Wyoming Cowboys (2–3) at San Jose State Spartans (3–2) – Game summary

Quarter	1	2	3	4	Total
Cowboys	0	0	0	0	0
Spartans	0	0	0	0	0

at CEFCU Stadium • San Jose, CA

- Date: October 9, 2026
- Game time: 6:00 p.m.
- Game weather: -
- Game attendance: -
- Referee: -
- TV announcers (CBSSN): Rich Waltz, Adam Breneman and Jordan Giorgio

Game information

First quarter
Second quarter
Third quarter
Fourth quarter

Statistics	WYO	SJSU
First downs		
Plays–yards		
Rushes–yards		
Passing yards		
Passing: comp–att–int		
Turnovers		
Time of possession		

Team	Category	Player	Statistics
Wyoming	Passing		
Wyoming	Rushing		
Wyoming	Receiving		
San Jose State	Passing		
San Jose State	Rushing		
San Jose State	Receiving		

=== at UTEP ===
San Jose State Spartans (3–3) at UTEP Miners (1–5) – Game summary

Quarter	1	2	3	4	Total
Spartans	0	0	0	0	0
Miners	0	0	0	0	0

at Sun Bowl • El Paso, TX

- Date: October 17, 2026
- Game time: 6:00 p.m.
- Game weather: -
- Game attendance: -
- Referee: -
- TV announcers (MW+): Andy Morgan and Cole Freytag

Game information

First quarter
Second quarter
Third quarter
Fourth quarter

Statistics	SJSU	UTEP
First downs		
Plays–yards		
Rushes–yards		
Passing yards		
Passing: Comp–Att–Int		
Turnovers		
Time of possession		

Team	Category	Player	Statistics
San Jose State	Passing		
San Jose State	Rushing		
San Jose State	Receiving		
UTEP	Passing		
UTEP	Rushing		
UTEP	Receiving		

=== at Nevada ===
San Jose State Spartans (4–3) at Nevada Wolf Pack (2–4) – Game summary

Quarter	1	2	3	4	Total
Spartans	0	0	0	0	0
Wolf Pack	0	0	0	0	0

at Mackay Stadium • Reno, NV

- Date: October 24, 2026
- Game time: 2:00 p.m.
- Game weather: -
- Game attendance: -
- Referee: -
- TV announcers (MW+): Mike Stefansson, Zach Madonick and McKenna Rowland

Game information

First quarter
Second quarter
Third quarter
Fourth quarter

Statistics	SJSU	NEV
First downs		
Plays–yards		
Rushes–yards		
Passing yards		
Passing: Comp–Att–Int		
Turnovers		
Time of possession		

Team	Category	Player	Statistics
San Jose State	Passing		
San Jose State	Rushing		
San Jose State	Receiving		
Nevada	Passing		
Nevada	Rushing		
Nevada	Receiving		

=== New Mexico ===
New Mexico Lobos (6–1) vs San Jose State Spartans (4–4) – Game summary

Quarter	1	2	3	4	Total
Lobos	0	14	7	0	21
Spartans	3	6	0	7	16

at CEFCU Stadium • San Jose, CA

- Date: October 31, 2026
- Game time: 1:00 p.m.
- Game weather: -
- Game attendance: -
- Referee: -
- TV announcers (MW+/NBCSBA): Chris Sylvester, James Jones and Lindsey Pallares

Game information

First quarter
Second quarter
Third quarter
Fourth quarter

Statistics	UNM	SJSU
First downs		
Plays–yards		
Rushes–yards		
Passing yards		
Passing: comp–att–int		
Turnovers		
Time of possession		

Team	Category	Player	Statistics
New Mexico	Passing		
New Mexico	Rushing		
New Mexico	Receiving		
San Jose State	Passing		
San Jose State	Rushing		
San Jose State	Receiving		

=== Northern Illinois ===
Northern Illinois Huskies (0–8) at San Jose State Spartans (4–5) – Game summary

Quarter	1	2	3	4	Total
Huskies	0	13	0	6	19
Spartans	10	6	14	0	30

at CEFCU Stadium • San Jose, California

- Date: November 7
- Game time: 1:00 PM (PST)
- Game weather: Sunny • Temperature: 75 °F (24 °C) • Wind: SE at 6 miles per hour (9.7 km/h)
- Game attendance: 9,786
- Referee: Kenneth Ray
- TV announcers (MW+/NBCSCA): Neal Ruhl (play-by-play), David Fales (analyst), and Guerin Austin

Game information

First quarter

- SJSU - Viliami Teu 5 Yd Run (Trajan Sinatra Kick), 9:43. SJSU 7-0. Drive: 9 plays, 59 yards, 4:30
- SJSU - Trajan Sinatra 25 Yd Field Goal, 2:06. SJSU 10-0. Drive: 9 plays, 74 yards, 4:41

Second quarter

- SJSU - Trajan Sinatra 46 Yd Field Goal, 11:46. SJSU 13-0. Drive: 8 plays, 29 yards, 3:53
- NIU - Telly Johnson Jr. 4 Yd Run (Ryan Short PAT failed), 8:07. SJSU 13-6. Drive: 7 plays, 81 yards, 3:36
- NIU - Zaire McKinney 19 Yd pass from Taron Dickens (Ryan Short Kick), 3:25. Tied 13-13. Drive: 8 plays, 81 yards, 3:33
- SJSU - Trajan Sinatra 22 Yd Field Goal, 1:37. SJSU 16-13. Drive: 8 plays, 70 yards, 1:48

Third quarter

- SJSU - Viliami Teu 1 Yd Run (Trajan Sinatra Kick), 9:32. SJSU 23-13. Drive: 7 plays, 18 yards, 4:12
- SJSU - Dominique McKenzie 29 Yd pass from Daniel Rolovich (Trajan Sinatra Kick), 6:09. SJSU 30-13. Drive: 1 play, 29 yards, 0:09

Fourth quarter

- NIU - Taron Dickens 1 Yd Run (Two-Point Pass Conversion Failed), 3:55. SJSU 30-19. Drive: 10 plays, 85 yards, 3:52

Statistics	NIU	SJSU
First downs	24	14
Plays–yards	74-400	60-316
Rushes–yards	38-141	33-85
Passing yards	259	231
Passing: comp–att–int	26-36-1	16-27-0
Turnovers	2	0
Time of possession	31:46	28:14

Team	Category	Player	Statistics
Northern Illinois	Passing	Taron Dickens	26/36, 259 yards, TD, INT
Northern Illinois	Rushing	Elijah Porter	12 carries, 79 yards
Northern Illinois	Receiving	DeAree Rogers	6 receptions, 86 yards
San Jose State	Passing	Daniel Rolovich	16/27, 231 yards, TD
San Jose State	Rushing	Viliami Teu	17 carries, 42 yards, 2 TDs
San Jose State	Receiving	Dominique McKenzie	2 receptions, 71 yards, TD

=== at Air Force ===
San Jose State Spartans (5–5) at Air Force Falcons (7–2) – Game summary

Quarter	1	2	3	4	Total
Spartans	0	0	0	0	0
Falcons	0	0	0	0	0

at Falcon Stadium • Colorado Springs, CO

- Date: November 14, 2026
- Game time: 4:00 p.m.
- Game weather: -
- Game attendance: -
- Referee: -
- TV announcers (CBSSN): Jordan Kent, Robert Turbin and Brandon Baylor

Game information

First quarter
Second quarter
Third quarter
Fourth quarter

Statistics	SJSU	AFA
First downs		
Plays–yards		
Rushes–yards		
Passing yards		
Passing: Comp–Att–Int		
Turnovers		
Time of possession		

Team	Category	Player	Statistics
San Jose State	Passing		
San Jose State	Rushing		
San Jose State	Receiving		
Air Force	Passing		
Air Force	Rushing		
Air Force	Receiving		

=== UNLV ===
UNLV Rebels (6–4) vs San Jose State Spartans (5–6) – Game summary

Quarter	1	2	3	4	Total
Rebels	0	0	0	0	0
Spartans	0	0	0	0	0

at CEFCU Stadium • San Jose, CA

- Date: November 21, 2026
- Game time: 4:00 p.m.
- Game weather: -
- Game attendance: -
- Referee: -
- TV announcers (CBSSN): Rich Waltz, Adam Breneman and Jordan Giorgio

Game information

First quarter
Second quarter
Third quarter
Fourth quarter

Statistics	UNLV	SJSU
First downs		
Plays–yards		
Rushes–yards		
Passing yards		
Passing: comp–att–int		
Turnovers		
Time of possession		

Team	Category	Player	Statistics
UNLV	Passing		
UNLV	Rushing		
UNLV	Receiving		
San Jose State	Passing		
San Jose State	Rushing		
San Jose State	Receiving		

=== North Dakota State ===
North Dakota State Bison (0–0) at San Jose State Spartans (0–0) – Game summary

Quarter	1	2	3	4	Total
Bison	0	0	0	0	0
Spartans	0	0	0	0	0

at CEFCU Stadium • San Jose, CA

- Date: November 28, 2026
- Game time: 12:30 p.m.
- Game weather: -
- Game attendance: -
- Referee: -
- TV: CBSSN

Game information

First quarter
Second quarter
Third quarter
Fourth quarter

Statistics	NDSU	SJSU
First downs		
Plays–yards		
Rushes–yards		
Passing yards		
Passing: comp–att–int		
Turnovers		
Time of possession		

Team	Category	Player	Statistics
North Dakota State	Passing		
North Dakota State	Rushing		
North Dakota State	Receiving		
San Jose State	Passing		
San Jose State	Rushing		
San Jose State	Receiving		
