= 2026 New Mexico Lobos football team =

American college football season

2026 New Mexico Lobos football
- Conference: Mountain West Conference
- Record: 9–2 (6–1 MW)
- Head coach: Jason Eck (2nd season)
- Offensive coordinator: Luke Schleusner (2nd season)
- Offensive scheme: Pro spread
- Defensive coordinator: Spence Nowinsky (2nd season)
- Base defense: 4–2–5
- Home stadium: University Stadium

2026 Mountain West Conference football standings
	Conf.			Overall
Team	W		L	W		L
New Mexico	6	–	1	9	–	2
Wyoming	6	–	2	7	–	4
North Dakota State	5	–	2	8	–	2
Air Force	5	–	2	9	–	2
UNLV	4	–	2	6	–	4
Nevada	3	–	3	4	–	6
San Jose State	3	–	4	5	–	6
Hawaii	2	–	5	3	–	7
Northern Illinois	0	–	6	0	–	10
UTEP	0	–	7	1	–	10
Championship: December 4, 2026
As of November 21, 2026; Rankings from CFP rankings

The 2026 New Mexico Lobos football team represents the University of New Mexico as a member of the Mountain West Conference (MW) during the 2026 NCAA Division I FBS football season. The Lobos are led by second-year head coach Jason Eck and play their home games at University Stadium in Albuquerque, New Mexico.

The season marks the second year under Eck following a breakthrough 2025 campaign in which New Mexico finished 9–4, recorded the program's first nine-win season since 2007, and earned its first bowl appearance since 2016.

Entering the 2026 season, the Lobos were selected as the preseason favorite to win the Mountain West Conference in the league's annual preseason media poll after returning key contributors from their 2025 squad and following a significant turnaround under Eck.

On November 1, the Lobos were ranked in the AP poll for the first time in program history, at No. 22, after a 21–16 win over the San Jose State Spartans, earning 179 points in the poll.

== Schedule ==
Date	Time	Opponent	Site	TV	Result	Attendance
September 5	8:00 p.m.	Central Michigan*	University Stadium; Albuquerque, NM	FS1	W 38–7	24,126
September 12	2:00 p.m.	Mercyhurst*	University Stadium; Albuquerque, NM	MW+	W 70–7	23,874
September 19	5:30 p.m.	at No. 24 Oklahoma*	Gaylord Family Oklahoma Memorial Stadium; Norman, OK	ESPN2	L 6–14	83,423
September 26	1:30 p.m.	at New Mexico State*	Aggie Memorial Stadium; Las Cruces, NM (Rio Grande Rivalry)	CBSSN	W 42–18	25,024
October 3	2:00 p.m.	UTEP	University Stadium; Albuquerque, NM	MW+	W 61–7	28,256
October 17	8:30 p.m.	at Hawaii	Clarence T. C. Ching Athletics Complex; Honolulu, HI	FS1	W 21–10	12,941
October 24	8:00 p.m.	North Dakota State	University Stadium; Albuquerque, NM	The CW	W 21–16	34,794
October 31	2:00 p.m.	at San Jose State	CEFCU Stadium; San Jose, CA	MW+	W 21–16	9,291
November 6	7:00 p.m.	at Nevada	Mackay Stadium; Reno, NV	CBSSN	W 31–3	15,290
November 14	5:30 p.m.	UNLV	University Stadium; Albuquerque, NM	The CW	L 17–21	37,440
November 20	7:00 p.m.	at Wyoming	War Memorial Stadium; Laramie, WY	FS1	W 24–17	22,002
November 27	2:30 p.m.	Air Force	University Stadium; Albuquerque, NM	The CW		
*Non-conference game; Rankings from AP Poll (and CFP Rankings, after November 3) – Released prior to game; All times are in Mountain time; Source:

== Rankings ==
Ranking movements Legend: ██ Increase in ranking ██ Decrease in ranking — = Not ranked RV = Received votes
	Week															
Poll	Pre	1	2	3	4	5	6	7	8	9	10	11	12	13	14	Final
AP	RV	—	—	—	—	—	RV	RV	RV	22	23	RV				
Coaches	RV	RV	RV	—	RV	RV	RV	RV	RV	25	25	RV				
CFP	Not released									—	—	—				Not released

== Game summaries ==
=== Central Michigan ===
Central Michigan Chippewas (0–0) at New Mexico Lobos (0–0) – Game summary

Quarter	1	2	3	4	Total
Chippewas	0	0	0	7	7
Lobos	7	13	15	3	38

at University Stadium • Albuquerque, NM

- Date: September 5
- Game time: 8:15 p.m. MDT
- Game weather: 85 °F (29 °C), cloudy, NW 9 miles per hour (14 km/h)
- Game attendance: 24,126
- Referee: Christian Watson
- TV announcers (FS1): Carlo Jiménez and Petros Papadakis

Game information

First quarter

- (7:18) UNM – Scottre Humphrey 7-yard run, Grant Glasgow kick (Drive: 9 plays, 78 yards, 3:57; New Mexico 7–0)

Second quarter

- (12:56) UNM – James Laubstein 1-yard run, Grant Glasgow kick (Drive: 15 plays, 64 yards, 7:41; New Mexico 14–0)
- (8:19) UNM – Grant Glasgow 48-yard field goal (Drive: 9 plays, 33 yards, 3:40; New Mexico 17–0)
- (1:04) UNM – Grant Glasgow 46-yard field goal (Drive: 10 plays, 60 yards, 6:10; New Mexico 20–0)

Third quarter

- (7:05) UNM – James Laubstein 3-yard run, Scottre Humphrey run (Drive: 9 plays, 80 yards, 4:30; New Mexico 28–0)
- (4:03) UNM – Bailen George 11-yard pass from Luke Moga, Grant Glasgow kick (Drive: 3 plays, 39 yards, 1:31; New Mexico 35–0)

Fourth quarter

- (9:31) UNM – Grant Glasgow 49-yard field goal (Drive: 7 plays, 6 yards, 4:36; New Mexico 38–0)
- (4:23) CMU – Nasir Williams 23-yard run, Caden VanHuis kick (Drive: 10 plays, 75 yards, 5:08; New Mexico 38–7)

Statistics	CMU	UNM
First downs	9	28
Plays–yards	48–149	69–364
Rushes–yards	32–119	44–205
Passing yards	30	159
Passing: comp–att–int	7–16–1	17–25–0
Turnovers	2	0
Time of possession	22:31	37:29

Team	Category	Player	Statistics
Central Michigan	Passing	Jadyn Glasser	4/10, 16 yards
Central Michigan	Rushing	Angel Flores	10 carries, 27 yards
Central Michigan	Receiving	Justin Ruffin Jr.	3 receptions, 9 yards
New Mexico	Passing	Luke Moga	13/17, 116 yards, TD
New Mexico	Rushing	Scottre Humphrey	13 carries, 64 yards, TD
New Mexico	Receiving	Bailen George	4 receptions, 36 yards, TD

=== Mercyhurst (FCS) ===
Mercyhurst Lakers (FCS) (0–2) at New Mexico Lobos (1–0) – Game summary

Quarter	1	2	3	4	Total
Lakers (FCS)	7	0	0	0	7
Lobos	7	42	14	7	70

at University Stadium • Albuquerque, New Mexico

- Date: September 12
- Game time: 2:05 p.m. MDT
- Game weather: Sunny, 93 °F (34 °C), NW winds 7 miles per hour (11 km/h)
- Game attendance: 23,874
- Referee: Zachary Erdmann
- TV announcers (MW+): Robert Portnoy and DonTrell Moore

Game information

First quarter

- UNM – Luke Moga 1-yard run (Grant Glasgow kick), 0:27. New Mexico 7–0. Drive: 6 plays, 40 yards, 3:31.
- MER – Speedy Yancey 75-yard pass from Anthony Wolter (Rocco Marcantonio kick), 0:13. Tied 7–7. Drive: 1 play, 75 yards, 0:14.

Second quarter

- UNM – Kiefer Sibley 36-yard run (Grant Glasgow kick), 14:14. New Mexico 14–7. Drive: 4 plays, 69 yards, 0:52.
- UNM – Cade Keith 42-yard pass from Luke Moga (Grant Glasgow kick), 13:09. New Mexico 21–7. Drive: 3 plays, 47 yards, 0:18.
- UNM – Scottre Humphrey 2-yard run (Grant Glasgow kick), 12:19. New Mexico 28–7. Drive: 2 plays, 4 yards, 0:43.
- UNM – Troy Omeire 64-yard pass from Toa Fa'avae (Grant Glasgow kick), 9:14. New Mexico 35–7. Drive: 2 plays, 68 yards, 0:51.
- UNM – Toa Fa'avae 26-yard run (Grant Glasgow kick), 6:57. New Mexico 42–7. Drive: 2 plays, 26 yards, 0:15.
- UNM – Scottre Humphrey 3-yard run (Grant Glasgow kick), 0:50. New Mexico 49–7. Drive: 5 plays, 55 yards, 0:50.

Third quarter

- UNM – Deshaun Buchanan 5-yard run (Nicholas Romero kick), 10:46. New Mexico 56–7. Drive: 1 play, 5 yards, 0:05.
- UNM – DJ Darling 35-yard pass from Luke Moga (Nicholas Romero kick), 9:11. New Mexico 63–7. Drive: 1 play, 35 yards, 0:08.

Fourth quarter

- UNM – Jerod Terry Jr. 8-yard run (Nicholas Romero kick), 5:41. New Mexico 70–7. Drive: 7 plays, 50 yards, 4:16.

Statistics	MERC	UNM
First downs	10	23
Plays–yards	55–155	70–460
Rushes–yards	28–18	52–287
Passing yards	137	173
Passing: comp–att–int	13–27–4	7–18–0
Turnovers	6	0
Time of possession	26:27	33:33

Team	Category	Player	Statistics
Mercyhurst	Passing	Anthony Wolter	9/20, 111 yards, TD, 3 INT
Mercyhurst	Rushing	Jameir Gamble	8 carries, 17 yards
Mercyhurst	Receiving	Speedy Yancey	1 reception, 75 yards, TD
New Mexico	Passing	Toa Fa'avae	3/9, 91 yards, TD
New Mexico	Rushing	Scottre Humphrey	15 carries, 110 yards, 2 TD
New Mexico	Receiving	Troy Omeire	2 receptions, 70 yards, TD

=== at No. 24 Oklahoma ===
New Mexico Lobos (2–0) at No. 24 Oklahoma Sooners (1–1) – Game summary

Quarter	1	2	3	4	Total
Lobos	0	6	0	0	6
No. 24 Sooners	0	7	7	0	14

at Gaylord Family Oklahoma Memorial Stadium • Norman, Oklahoma

- Date: September 19
- Game time: 6:35 p.m. CDT
- Game weather: Sunny, 95 °F (35 °C), S winds 12 miles per hour (19 km/h)
- Game attendance: 83,423
- Referee: Marc Curles
- TV announcers (ESPN2): Jay Alter, Tom Luginbill and Lauren Sisler

Game information

First quarter

- No scoring.

Second quarter

- OU – Hayden Hansen 29-yard pass from John Mateer (Tate Sandell kick), 13:49. Oklahoma 7–0. Drive: 12 plays, 80 yards, 6:46.
- UNM – Grant Glasgow 24-yard field goal, 4:00. Oklahoma 7–3. Drive: 7 plays, 53 yards, 3:44.
- UNM – Grant Glasgow 42-yard field goal, 1:48. Oklahoma 7–6. Drive: 6 plays, −2 yards, 1:21.

Third quarter

- OU – Isaiah Sategna III 53-yard pass from John Mateer (Tate Sandell kick), 8:05. Oklahoma 14–6. Drive: 5 plays, 70 yards, 1:47.

Fourth quarter

- No scoring.

Statistics	UNM	OU
First downs	12	14
Plays–yards	57–185	58–299
Rushes–yards	38–69	32–61
Passing yards	116	238
Passing: comp–att–int	8–19–0	19–26–2
Turnovers	0	3
Time of possession	34:08	25:52

Team	Category	Player	Statistics
New Mexico	Passing	Toa Fa'avae	4/10, 79 yards
New Mexico	Rushing	Kiefer Sibley	9 carries, 41 yards
New Mexico	Receiving	Cade Keith	5 receptions, 78 yards
Oklahoma	Passing	John Mateer	19/25, 238 yards, 2 TD, 2 INT
Oklahoma	Rushing	Lloyd Avant	8 carries, 27 yards
Oklahoma	Receiving	Isaiah Sategna III	6 receptions, 101 yards, TD

=== at New Mexico State (Rio Grande Rivalry) ===
New Mexico Lobos (2–1) at New Mexico State Aggies (1–2) – Game summary

Quarter	1	2	3	4	Total
Lobos	14	0	21	7	42
Aggies	0	3	0	15	18

at Aggie Memorial Stadium • Las Cruces, New Mexico

- Date: September 26
- Game time: 1:37 p.m. MDT
- Game weather: Sunny, 80 °F (27 °C), SW winds 4 miles per hour (6.4 km/h)
- Game attendance: 25,024
- Referee: Stuart Mullins
- TV announcers (CBSSN): Alex del Barrio and Randy Cross

Game information

First quarter

- UNM – Scottre Humphrey 3-yard run (Grant Glasgow kick), 11:26. New Mexico 7–0. Drive: 8 plays, 85 yards, 3:29.
- UNM – Scottre Humphrey 1-yard run (Grant Glasgow kick), 3:03. New Mexico 14–0. Drive: 4 plays, 33 yards, 2:01.

Second quarter

- NMSU – Ilya Uvaydov 23-yard field goal, 11:26. New Mexico 14–3. Drive: 16 plays, 69 yards, 6:37.

Third quarter

- UNM – Brett Karhu 3-yard pass from Toa Fa'avae (Grant Glasgow kick), 7:42. New Mexico 21–3. Drive: 10 plays, 55 yards, 5:52.
- UNM – James Laubstein 9-yard run (Grant Glasgow kick), 6:03. New Mexico 28–3. Drive: 3 plays, 17 yards, 1:24.
- UNM – Kiefer Sibley 3-yard run (Grant Glasgow kick), 2:07. New Mexico 35–3. Drive: 2 plays, 71 yards, 0:45.

Fourth quarter

- NMSU – Touchdown (Jalen Brown two-point rush), 11:30. New Mexico 35–11. Drive: 12 plays, 75 yards, 5:37.
- UNM – James Laubstein 1-yard run (Grant Glasgow kick), 1:27. New Mexico 42–11. Drive: 8 plays, 23 yards, 4:19.
- NMSU – Myles Libman 8-yard pass from Adam Damante (Ilya Uvaydov kick), 0:18. New Mexico 42–18. Drive: 7 plays, 75 yards, 1:09.

Statistics	UNM	NMSU
First downs	19	22
Plays–yards	64–430	69–405
Rushes–yards	47–253	31–137
Passing yards	177	268
Passing: comp–att–int	10–17–0	23–38–2
Turnovers	0	3
Time of possession	33:58	26:02

Team	Category	Player	Statistics
New Mexico	Passing	Toa Fa'avae	10/17, 177 yards, TD
New Mexico	Rushing	Scottre Humphrey	19 carries, 104 yards, 2 TD
New Mexico	Receiving	Bailen George	3 receptions, 102 yards
New Mexico State	Passing	Adam Damante	16/19, 162 yards, TD
New Mexico State	Rushing	James Jones	14 carries, 112 yards
New Mexico State	Receiving	Josiah Thomas	5 receptions, 90 yards

=== vs UTEP ===
UTEP Miners (1–3) at New Mexico Lobos (3–1) – Game summary

Quarter	1	2	3	4	Total
Miners	0	0	0	7	7
Lobos	14	7	16	24	61

at University Stadium • Albuquerque, New Mexico

- Date: October 3
- Game time: 2:05 p.m. MDT
- Game weather: Sunny, 71 °F (22 °C), NW winds 4 miles per hour (6.4 km/h)
- Game attendance: 28,256
- Referee: Patrick Foy
- TV announcers (MW+): Robert Portnoy and DonTrell Moore

Game information

First quarter

- UNM – James Laubstein 14-yard run (Grant Glasgow kick), 7:00. New Mexico 7–0. Drive: 6 plays, 49 yards, 3:13.
- UNM – Cade Keith 12-yard pass from Toa Fa'avae (Grant Glasgow kick), 0:00. New Mexico 14–0. Drive: 10 plays, 82 yards, 4:46.

Second quarter

- UNM – Bailen George 52-yard pass from Toa Fa'avae (Grant Glasgow kick), 8:23. New Mexico 21–0. Drive: 3 plays, 61 yards, 1:21.

Third quarter

- UNM – Austin Brawley 65-yard interception return (Grant Glasgow kick), 13:28. New Mexico 28–0.
- UNM – Safety, 7:12. New Mexico 30–0.
- UNM – Bailen George 10-yard pass from Toa Fa'avae (Grant Glasgow kick), 2:45. New Mexico 37–0. Drive: 8 plays, 70 yards, 4:21.

Fourth quarter

- UNM – Scottre Humphrey 1-yard run (Grant Glasgow kick), 14:34. New Mexico 44–0. Drive: 5 plays, 23 yards, 2:22.
- UTEP – Raymond Moore III 86-yard run (Carlos Arreola kick), 13:11. New Mexico 44–7. Drive: 3 plays, 92 yards, 1:18.
- UNM – Cameron Mathews 54-yard run (Grant Glasgow kick), 11:37. New Mexico 51–7. Drive: 3 plays, 75 yards, 1:34.
- UNM – Grant Glasgow 24-yard field goal, 1:52. New Mexico 54–7. Drive: 14 plays, 65 yards, 7:13.
- UNM – Jake DeVos 53-yard fumble return (Grant Glasgow kick), 0:53. New Mexico 61–7.

Statistics	UTEP	UNM
First downs	11	24
Plays–yards	53–271	65–493
Rushes–yards	35–170	42–231
Passing yards	101	262
Passing: comp–att–int	8–18–3	17–23–1
Turnovers	5	1
Time of possession	28:32	31:28

Team	Category	Player	Statistics
UTEP	Passing	EJ Colson Jr.	6/12, 45 yards, INT
UTEP	Rushing	Raymond Moore III	11 carries, 135 yards, TD
UTEP	Receiving	Kam Thomas	3 receptions, 47 yards
New Mexico	Passing	Toa Fa'avae	15/19, 249 yards, 3 TD, INT
New Mexico	Rushing	Cameron Mathews	6 carries, 108 yards, TD
New Mexico	Receiving	DJ Darling	3 receptions, 75 yards

=== at Hawaiʻi ===
New Mexico Lobos (4–1) at Hawaiʻi Rainbow Warriors (1–5) – Game summary

Quarter	1	2	3	4	Total
Lobos	0	0	7	14	21
Rainbow Warriors	3	7	0	0	10

at Clarence T. C. Ching Athletics Complex • Honolulu, Hawaii

- Date: October 17
- Game time: 4:36 p.m. HST
- Game weather: Sunny, 84 °F (29 °C), NE winds 13 miles per hour (21 km/h)
- Game attendance: 12,941
- Referee: Brad Carrell
- TV announcers (FS1): Carlo Jiménez (play-by-play) and Robert Smith (analyst)

Game information

First quarter

- HAW – Sean Olvera-Harle 27-yard field goal, 7:51. Hawaiʻi 3–0. Drive: 9 plays, 40 yards, 3:15.

Second quarter

- HAW – Titan Lacaden 1-yard pass from Micah Alejado (Sean Olvera-Harle kick), 0:06. Hawaiʻi 10–0. Drive: 9 plays, 46 yards, 1:47.

Third quarter

- UNM – Scottre Humphrey 1-yard run (Grant Glasgow kick), 9:43. Hawaiʻi 10–7. Drive: 9 plays, 75 yards, 5:17.

Fourth quarter

- UNM – Toa Fa'avae 21-yard run (Grant Glasgow kick), 6:57. New Mexico 14–10. Drive: 12 plays, 80 yards, 7:04.
- UNM – Scottre Humphrey 49-yard run (Grant Glasgow kick), 3:24. New Mexico 21–10. Drive: 1 play, 49 yards, 0:08.

Statistics	UNM	HAW
First downs	16	20
Plays–yards	59–337	67–298
Rushes–yards	48–243	27–48
Passing yards	94	250
Passing: comp–att–int	6–11–2	23–40–1
Turnovers	3	2
Time of possession	31:56	28:04

Team	Category	Player	Statistics
New Mexico	Passing	Toa Fa'avae	5/10, 59 yards, 2 INT
New Mexico	Rushing	Scottre Humphrey	15 carries, 90 yards, 2 TD
New Mexico	Receiving	Toa Fa'avae	1 reception, 35 yards
Hawaiʻi	Passing	Micah Alejado	23/40, 250 yards, TD, INT
Hawaiʻi	Rushing	Cam Barfield	12 carries, 34 yards
Hawaiʻi	Receiving	Devin Alves	5 receptions, 76 yards

=== North Dakota State ===
North Dakota State Bison (6–1) at New Mexico Lobos (5–1) – Game summary

Quarter	1	2	3	4	Total
Bison	3	0	6	7	16
Lobos	7	7	0	7	21

at University Stadium • Albuquerque, New Mexico

- Date: October 24
- Game time: 8:00 p.m. MDT
- Game weather: Cloudy; 60 °F (16 °C); Wind: SE 10 mph
- Game attendance: 34,794
- Referee: Cal McNeill
- TV announcers (The CW): Jack McMullen (play-by-play), Cody Kessler (analyst), and Marshall Newhouse (sideline)

Game information

First quarter

- (11:51) UNM – Kiefer Sibley 29-yard run, Grant Glasgow kick (Drive: 6 plays, 75 yards, 3:09; New Mexico 7–0)
- (5:17) NDSU – Drew Klein 27-yard field goal (Drive: 9 plays, 61 yards, 3:30; New Mexico 7–3)

Second quarter

- (0:10) UNM – Scottre Humphrey 2-yard run, Grant Glasgow kick (Drive: 7 plays, 46 yards, 1:33; New Mexico 14–3)

Third quarter

- (6:12) NDSU – Reis Kessel 15-yard pass from Nathan Hayes (Drive: 8 plays, 63 yards, 4:06; New Mexico 14–9)

Fourth quarter

- (10:57) UNM – Austin Brawley 56-yard interception, Nicholas Romero kick (New Mexico 21–9)
- (6:42) NDSU – Mekhi Collins 4-yard pass from Nathan Hayes, Drew Klein kick (Drive: 10 plays, 75 yards, 4:15; New Mexico 21–16)

Statistics	NDSU	UNM
First downs	13	15
Plays–yards	63–251	58–279
Rushes–yards	28–53	44–187
Passing yards	196	92
Passing: comp–att–int	17–35–2	8–14–1
Turnovers	2	1
Time of possession	29:28	30:32

Team	Category	Player	Statistics
North Dakota State	Passing	Nathan Hayes	17/33, 198 yards, 2 TD, 2 INT
North Dakota State	Rushing	Myles Mitchell	10 carries, 34 yards
North Dakota State	Receiving	Jackson Williams	4 receptions, 71 yards
New Mexico	Passing	Toa Fa'avae	8/14, 92 yards, INT
New Mexico	Rushing	Kiefer Sibley	13 carries, 91 yards, TD
New Mexico	Receiving	Cade Keith	5 receptions, 53 yards

=== at San Jose State ===
New Mexico Lobos (6–1) at San Jose State Spartans (4–4) – Game summary

Quarter	1	2	3	4	Total
Lobos	0	14	7	0	21
Spartans	3	6	0	7	16

at CEFCU Stadium • San Jose, California

- Date: October 31
- Game time: 2:00 p.m. MDT
- Game weather: TBD
- Game attendance: TBD
- Referee: TBD
- TV announcers (MW+): Chris Sylvester (play by play), James Jones (analyst), and Lindsey Pallares (sideline)

Game information

First quarter

Second quarter

Third quarter

Fourth quarter

Statistics	UNM	SJSU
First downs		
Plays–yards		
Rushes–yards		
Passing yards		
Passing: comp–att–int		
Turnovers		
Time of possession		

Team	Category	Player	Statistics
New Mexico	Passing		
New Mexico	Rushing		
New Mexico	Receiving		
San Jose State	Passing		
San Jose State	Rushing		
San Jose State	Receiving		

=== at Nevada ===
New Mexico Lobos (7–1) at Nevada Wolf Pack (3–5) – Game summary

Quarter	1	2	Total
Lobos			0
Wolf Pack			0

at Mackay Stadium • Reno, Nevada

- Date: November 6
- Game time: 7:00 p.m. MDT
- Game weather: TBD
- Game attendance: TBD
- Referee: TBD
- TV announcers (CBSSN): Jack Gordon and Taylor McHargue

Game information

First quarter

Second quarter

Third quarter

Fourth quarter

Statistics	UNM	NEV
First downs		
Plays–yards		
Rushes–yards		
Passing yards		
Passing: comp–att–int		
Turnovers		
Time of possession		

Team	Category	Player	Statistics
New Mexico	Passing		
New Mexico	Rushing		
New Mexico	Receiving		
Nevada	Passing		
Nevada	Rushing		
Nevada	Receiving		

=== UNLV ===
UNLV Rebels (5–4) at New Mexico Lobos (8–1) – Game summary

Quarter	1	2	Total
Rebels			0
Lobos			0

at University Stadium • Albuquerque, New Mexico

- Date: November 14
- Game time: 5:30 p.m. MDT
- Game weather: TBD
- Game attendance: TBD
- Referee: TBD
- TV announcers (The CW): Jack McMullen, Cody Kessler and Marshall Newhouse

Game information

First quarter

Second quarter

Third quarter

Fourth quarter

Statistics	UNLV	UNM
First downs		
Plays–yards		
Rushes–yards		
Passing yards		
Passing: comp–att–int		
Turnovers		
Time of possession		

Team	Category	Player	Statistics
UNLV	Passing		
UNLV	Rushing		
UNLV	Receiving		
New Mexico	Passing		
New Mexico	Rushing		
New Mexico	Receiving		

=== at Wyoming ===
New Mexico Lobos (8–2) at Wyoming Cowboys (7–3) – Game summary

Quarter	1	2	Total
Lobos			0
Cowboys			0

at War Memorial Stadium • Laramie, Wyoming

- Date: November 20
- Game time: 7:00 p.m. MDT
- Game weather: TBD
- Game attendance: TBD
- Referee: TBD
- TV announcers (FS1): Evan Lepler and Tanner Morgan

Game information

First quarter

Second quarter

Third quarter

Fourth quarter

Statistics	UNM	WYO
First downs		
Plays–yards		
Rushes–yards		
Passing yards		
Passing: comp–att–int		
Turnovers		
Time of possession		

Team	Category	Player	Statistics
New Mexico	Passing		
New Mexico	Rushing		
New Mexico	Receiving		
Wyoming	Passing		
Wyoming	Rushing		
Wyoming	Receiving		

=== Air Force ===
Air Force Falcons (0–0) at New Mexico Lobos (0–0) – Game summary

Quarter	1	2	Total
Falcons			0
Lobos			0

at University Stadium • Albuquerque, New Mexico

- Date: November 27
- Game time: 2:30 p.m. MDT
- Game weather: TBD
- Game attendance: TBD
- Referee: TBD
- TV: The CW

Game information

First quarter

Second quarter

Third quarter

Fourth quarter

Statistics	AFA	UNM
First downs		
Plays–yards		
Rushes–yards		
Passing yards		
Passing: comp–att–int		
Turnovers		
Time of possession		

Team	Category	Player	Statistics
Air Force	Passing		
Air Force	Rushing		
Air Force	Receiving		
New Mexico	Passing		
New Mexico	Rushing		
New Mexico	Receiving		

== Personnel ==
=== Transfers ===
==== Outgoing ====
Player	Position	Destination
Dorian Thomas	TE	California
D. J. McKinney	RB	Tulsa
Daniel Hughes	P	Florida State
Trey DuBuc	LS	Texas
Landon Williams	DE	Stephen F. Austin
Marcus Vinson	TE	Florida Atlantic
Travis Gray	OL	UT Martin
Cole Welliver	QB	Southeastern Louisiana
Isaiah Blair	WR	Incarnate Word
Aiden Valdez	TE	Southern
Jordan Mora	OL	Midwestern State
Max Lantzsch	DL	Robert Morris
Luke Drzewiecki	PK	Minnesota
Isaiah Chavez	QB	
Mihalis Santorineos	LB	
Randolph Kpai	LB	

==== Incoming ====
Player	Position	Previous school
Ormanie Arnold	CB	Cincinnati / Idaho
Joshua Barnes	DB	Idaho
KJ Battle	CB	Towson
Jalen Charles	DL	College Park HS
Deven Dyer	DL	Western New Mexico / New Mexico State
Lincoln Epstein	LS	Central Michigan
Markus Fetcho	OL	Laney College
Will Hicks	DB	Hampton
Michael Kern	P	California / Texas
Kevin Longstreet	CB	USC / Louisville / Texas A&M
Clay Martineau	LB	Boise State
Cameron Mathews	RB	Memphis
Eric McClain	DB	Ball State
Ken Meir	OL	Temple / Lindenwood / Foothill CC
Cole Millward	OL	Weber State
Luke Moga	QB	Oregon
Joey Olsen	TE	USC
Konner Olson	K	St. Bonaventure HS
Troy Omeire	WR	UNLV / Arizona State / Texas
AJ Robinson	DL	Northern Illinois / Independence CC
Trenton Rocker	LB	Copiah–Lincoln CC
Nicholas Romero	K	Wagner
Keifer Seibley	RB	North Texas
Bear Tenney	TE	Sacramento State
Albert Tuakalau	DL	College of San Mateo
Tripp Walsh	TE	Iowa State
Miles Williams	WR	Eastern Washington

=== Coaching staff additions ===
Name	New position	Previous team	Previous position
Zach Lujan	Associate head coach / Tight ends	Northwestern	Offensive coordinator / Quarterbacks
Erik Link	Assistant head coach / Special teams coordinator	Missouri	Special teams coordinator / Tight ends
Carson Walch	Offensive passing game coordinator / Wide receivers	Cleveland Browns	Director of player development
Darrius G. Smith	Running backs	Southern Utah	Running backs
Ryan McNamee	Chief of staff	UCLA	Director of football operations
Zach Parrella	Associate director of athletic performance	Louisiana	Strength and conditioning
Mitchell Mueller	Director of football equipment operations	Kansas	Assistant football equipment manager

=== Coaching staff departures ===
Name	Position	New team	New position
Daniel Da Prato	Associate head coach / Special teams coordinator	Minnesota	Special teams coordinator
Jared Elliott	Tight ends	Illinois	Tight ends
Colin Lockett	Wide receivers	UCLA	Wide receivers
John Johnson	Running backs	Iowa State	Running backs
Kiel McDonald	Volunteer offensive assistant	Texas State	Running Backs
