= 2026 New Mexico State Aggies football team =

American college football season

2026 New Mexico State Aggies football
- Conference: Conference USA
- Record: 3–8 (2–5 CUSA)
- Head coach: Tony Sanchez (3rd season)
- Offensive coordinator: David Yost (2nd season)
- Offensive scheme: Spread
- Defensive coordinator: Joe Morris (3rd season)
- Base defense: 4–2–5
- Home stadium: Aggie Memorial Stadium

2026 Conference USA football standings
	Conf.			Overall
Team	W		L	W		L
Liberty y	7	–	0	9	–	1
Jacksonville State y	6	–	1	8	–	3
Kennesaw State	4	–	3	5	–	6
Middle Tennessee	4	–	3	6	–	5
Delaware	4	–	3	6	–	5
Western Kentucky	3	–	4	4	–	7
Missouri State	3	–	4	4	–	7
FIU	2	–	5	4	–	7
New Mexico State	2	–	5	3	–	8
Sam Houston	0	–	7	1	–	10
Championship: Jacksonville State at Liberty
y – Championship game participant; As of November 22, 2026; Rankings from AP poll

The 2026 New Mexico State Aggies football team is representing New Mexico State University playing in Conference USA (CUSA) during the 2026 NCAA Division I FBS football season. The Aggies are led by Tony Sanchez in his third year as the program's head coach. The Aggies play their home games at Aggie Memorial Stadium, located in Las Cruces, New Mexico. After a mediocre 4–8 season, the Aggies will look to bounce back after a strong transfer portal period.

== Schedule ==
Date	Time	Opponent	Site	TV	Result	Attendance
August 29	5:00 p.m.	at Florida State*	Doak Campbell Stadium; Tallahassee, FL	The CW	L 17–34	65,915
September 5	5:00 p.m.	Mercyhurst*	Aggie Memorial Stadium; Las Cruces, NM	ESPN+	W 51–14	9,189
September 12	9:59 p.m.	at Hawaii*	Clarence T. C. Ching Athletics Complex; Honolulu, HI	MW+	L 19–29	12,905
September 26	1:30 p.m.	New Mexico*	Aggie Memorial Stadium; Las Cruces, NM (Rio Grande Rivalry)	CBSSN	L 18–42	25,024
October 1	6:00 p.m.	Western Kentucky	Aggie Memorial Stadium; Las Cruces, NM	CBSSN	W 34–13	5,513
October 7	5:30 p.m.	at FIU	Pitbull Stadium; Miami, FL	ESPN2	L 3–22	10,013
October 21	6:00 p.m.	at Sam Houston	Bowers Stadium; Huntsville, TX	ESPN2	W 30–24	8,577
October 28	6:00 p.m.	Jacksonville State	Aggie Memorial Stadium; Las Cruces, NM	ESPN2	L 0–24	6,511
November 7	6:00 p.m.	Liberty	Aggie Memorial Stadium; Las Cruces, NM	ESPNU	L 14–30	9,459
November 14	1:00 p.m.	at Missouri State	Robert W. Plaster Stadium; Springfield, MO	ESPN+	L 21–27 ^{OT}	12,767
November 21	1:00 p.m.	Delaware	Aggie Memorial Stadium; Las Cruces, NM	ESPN+	L 30–42	5,413
November 28	12:00 p.m.	at Middle Tennessee	Johnny "Red" Floyd Stadium; Murfreesboro, TN	ESPN+		
*Non-conference game; All times are in Mountain time

== Game summaries ==
=== at Florida State ===
New Mexico State Aggies (0–0) at Florida State Seminoles (0–0) – Game summary

Quarter	1	2	3	4	Total
Aggies	0	7	3	7	17
Seminoles	3	14	7	10	34

at Doak Campbell Stadium • Tallahassee, Florida

- Date: August 29
- Game time: 7:00 p.m.
- Game weather: Cloudy • Temperature: 85 °F (29 °C) • Wind: S at 4 miles per hour (6.4 km/h)
- Game attendance: 65,915
- Referee: Jerry Magallanes
- TV announcers (The CW): Thom Brennaman, Jason Cabinda, and Wes Bryant

Game information

First quarter

- FSU – Gabe Panikowski 43-yard field goal, 3:05. Seminoles 3–0. Drive: 9 plays, 55 yards, 5:08.

Second quarter

- FSU – Ashton Daniels 4-yard run (Gabe Panikowski kick), 14:15. Seminoles 10–0. Drive: 7 plays, 60 yards, 2:23.
- NMSU – Brodie Malone-Bradford 33-yard pass from Trey Hedden (Ilya Uvaydov kick), 10:49. Seminoles 10–7. Drive: 9 plays, 75 yards, 3:26.
- FSU – Samuel Singleton Jr. 4-yard pass from Ashton Daniels (Gabe Panikowski kick), 0:36. Seminoles 17–7. Drive: 8 plays, 58 yards, 2:49.

Third quarter

- NMSU – Ilya Uvaydov 38-yard field goal, 7:36. Seminoles 17–10. Drive: 12 plays, 68 yards, 5:15.
- FSU – Samuel Singleton Jr. 2-yard run (Gabe Panikowski kick), 2:09. Seminoles 24–10. Drive: 12 plays, 51 yards, 5:17.

Fourth quarter

- FSU – Gabe Panikowski 41-yard field goal, 10:41. Seminoles 27–10. Drive: 7 plays, 64 yards, 4:08.
- NMSU – TK King 34-yard pass from Trey Hedden (David Barker kick), 7:42. Seminoles 27–17. Drive: 7 plays, 75 yards, 2:59.
- FSU – Ousmane Kromah 1-yard run (Gabe Panikowski kick), 4:01. Seminoles 34–17. Drive: 8 plays, 90 yards, 3:33.

Statistics	NMSU	FSU
First downs	18	20
Plays–yards	66–319	66–419
Rushes–yards	23–47	39–217
Passing yards	272	202
Passing: Comp–Att–Int	26–43–1	17–27–1
Turnovers	1	1
Time of possession	28:28	31:32

Team	Category	Player	Statistics
New Mexico State	Passing	Trey Hedden	26/42, 272 yards, 2 TD, INT
New Mexico State	Rushing	James Jones	11 carries, 28 yards
New Mexico State	Receiving	Brodie Malone-Bradford	6 receptions, 96 yards, TD
Florida State	Passing	Ashton Daniels	17/27, 202 yards, TD, INT
Florida State	Rushing	Ousmane Kromah	14 carries, 115 yards, TD
Florida State	Receiving	Samuel Singleton Jr.	4 receptions, 54 yards, TD

=== vs Mercyhurst (FCS) ===
Mercyhurst Lakers (FCS) (0–1) at New Mexico State Aggies (0–1) – Game summary

Quarter	1	2	3	4	Total
Lakers (FCS)	7	7	0	0	14
Aggies	13	10	7	21	51

at Aggie Memorial Stadium • Las Cruces, New Mexico

- Date: September 5
- Game time: 7:00 p.m.
- Game weather: Sunny • Temperature: 90 °F (32 °C) • Wind: W at 8 miles per hour (13 km/h)
- Game attendance: 9,189
- Referee: Reed Brotherton
- TV announcers (ESPN+): MJ Newsom, Danny Knee and Wes Bryant

Game information

First quarter

- NMSU – Nick Session 26-yard interception return (Ilya Uvaydov kick), 14:46. Aggies 7–0.
- MERC – Byron Caldwell Jr. 2-yard run (Rocco Marcantonio kick), 8:03. Tied 7–7. Drive: 11 plays, 75 yards, 6:43.
- NMSU – TJ Washington Jr. 16-yard run (Ilya Uvaydov PAT blocked), 1:24. Aggies 13–7. Drive: 5 plays, 65 yards, 2:45.

Second quarter

- MERC – Camden Lewis 14-yard pass from Alex Gevaudan (Rocco Marcantonio kick), 12:44. Lakers 14–13. Drive: 6 plays, 70 yards, 3:35.
- NMSU – Ilya Uvaydov 39-yard field goal, 7:59. Aggies 16–14. Drive: 7 plays, 51 yards, 2:59.
- NMSU – James Jones 46-yard run (Ilya Uvaydov kick), 5:19. Aggies 23–14. Drive: 2 plays, 48 yards, 0:29.

Third quarter

- NMSU – TJ Washington Jr. 1-yard run (Ilya Uvaydov kick), 7:42. Aggies 30–14. Drive: 10 plays, 55 yards, 4:18.

Fourth quarter

- NMSU – James Jones 2-yard pass from Trey Hedden (Ilya Uvaydov kick), 14:56. Aggies 37–14. Drive: 9 plays, 64 yards, 4:43.
- NMSU – Terrione Graves 83-yard pass from Trey Hedden (Ilya Uvaydov kick), 12:32. Aggies 44–14. Drive: 1 play, 83 yards, 0:19.
- NMSU – AJ Williams III 23-yard pass from Adam Damante (Ilya Uvaydov kick), 4:29. Aggies 51–14. Drive: 8 plays, 66 yards, 4:23.

Statistics	MERC	NMSU
First downs	14	20
Plays–yards	58–237	65–530
Rushes–yards	27–70	42–235
Passing yards	167	295
Passing: comp–att–int	16–31–2	14–23–0
Turnovers	2	0
Time of possession	30:46	29:14

Team	Category	Player	Statistics
Mercyhurst	Passing	Alex Gevaudan	13/21, 147 yards, TD, INT
Mercyhurst	Rushing	Jameir Gamble	12 carries, 59 yards
Mercyhurst	Receiving	Evan Van Dyke	4 receptions, 60 yards
New Mexico State	Passing	Trey Hedden	11/20, 253 yards, 2 TD
New Mexico State	Rushing	James Jones	19 carries, 137 yards, TD
New Mexico State	Receiving	TK King	3 receptions, 94 yards

=== at Hawai'i ===
New Mexico State Aggies (1–1) at Hawaii Rainbow Warriors (0–2) – Game summary

Quarter	1	2	3	4	Total
Aggies	0	13	6	0	19
Rainbow Warriors	9	10	3	7	29

at Clarence T. C. Ching Athletics Complex • Honolulu, Hawaii

- Date: September 12
- Game time: 10:00 p.m.
- Game weather: Sunny • Temperature: 81 °F (27 °C) • Wind: NE 13 mph
- Game attendance: 12,905
- Referee: Kenneth Roy
- TV announcers (MW+): Kanoa Leahey (play-by-play), Rich Miano (analyst), Cienna Pilotin and Kyle Chinen (sideline reporters)

Game information

First quarter

- HAW – DeVon Rice 7-yard run (Sean Olvera-Harle kick failed), 8:41. Rainbow Warriors 6–0. Drive: 8 plays, 64 yards, 3:37.
- HAW – Sean Olvera-Harle 32-yard field goal, 4:28. 'Rainbow Warriors 9–0. Drive: 6 plays, 59 yards, 2:10.

Second quarter

- HAW – DeVon Rice 11-yard run (Sean Olvera-Harle kick), 13:37. Rainbow Warriors 16–0. Drive: 6 plays, 71 yards, 2:45.
- NMSU – James Jones 2-yard run (pass failed), 10:02. Rainbow Warriors 16–6. Drive: 8 plays, 65 yards, 3:35.
- NMSU – TK King 33-yard pass from Trey Hedden (Ilya Uvaydov kick), 1:17. Rainbow Warriors 16–13. Drive: 10 plays, 81 yards, 2:51.
- HAW – Sean Olvera-Harle 44-yard field goal, 0:11. Rainbow Warriors 19–13. Drive: 9 plays, 51 yards, 1:06.

Third quarter

- NMSU – De'Marcus Peters 84-yard fumble return (Ilya Uvaydov kick blocked), 13:15. Tied 19–19.
- HAW – Sean Olvera-Harle 33-yard field goal, 8:46. Rainbow Warriors 22–19. Drive: 11 plays, 57 yards, 4:23.

Fourth quarter

- HAW – Frank Abreu 7-yard pass from Tama Uiliata (Sean Olvera-Harle kick), 5:41. Rainbow Warriors 29–19. Drive: 10 plays, 46 yards, 5:35.

Statistics	NMSU	HAW
First downs	23	21
Plays–yards	66–380	72–420
Rushes–yards	31–124	26–67
Passing yards	256	353
Passing: comp–att–int	19–35–2	34–46–0
Turnovers	3	1
Time of possession	27:47	32:13

Team	Category	Player	Statistics
New Mexico State	Passing	Trey Hedden	19/35, 256 yards, TD, 2 INT
New Mexico State	Rushing	James Jones	13 carries, 78 yards, TD
New Mexico State	Receiving	TK King	4 receptions, 67 yards, TD
Hawaii	Passing	Micah Alejado	33/45, 346 yards
Hawaii	Rushing	DeVon Rice	16 carries, 59 yards, 2 TD
Hawaii	Receiving	Tama Uiliata	10 receptions, 107 yards

=== New Mexico (Rio Grande Rivalry) ===
New Mexico Lobos (2–0) at New Mexico State Aggies (1–2) – Game summary

Quarter	1	2	3	4	Total
Lobos	14	0	21	7	42
Aggies	0	3	0	15	18

at Aggie Memorial Stadium, Las Cruces, New Mexico

- Date: September 26
- Game time: 1:30 PM MDT
- Game weather: Sunny, 80 °F (27 °C), SW winds 4 miles per hour (6.4 km/h)
- Game attendance: 25,024
- Referee: Stuart Mullins
- TV announcers (CBSSN): Alex del Barrio and Randy Cross

Game information

First quarter

- UNM – Scottre Humphrey 3-yard run (Grant Glasgow kick), 11:26. New Mexico 7–0. Drive: 8 plays, 85 yards, 3:29.
- UNM – Scottre Humphrey 1-yard run (Grant Glasgow kick), 3:03. New Mexico 14–0. Drive: 4 plays, 33 yards, 2:01.

Second quarter

- NMSU – Ilya Uvaydov 23-yard field goal, 11:26. New Mexico 14–3. Drive: 16 plays, 69 yards, 6:37.

Third quarter

- UNM – Brett Karhu 3-yard pass from Toa Fa'avae (Grant Glasgow kick), 7:42. New Mexico 21–3. Drive: 10 plays, 55 yards, 5:52.
- UNM – James Laubstein 9-yard run (Grant Glasgow kick), 6:03. New Mexico 28–3. Drive: 3 plays, 17 yards, 1:24.
- UNM – Kiefer Sibley 3-yard run (Grant Glasgow kick), 2:07. New Mexico 35–3. Drive: 2 plays, 71 yards, 0:45.

Fourth quarter

- NMSU – Touchdown (Jalen Brown two-point rush), 11:30. New Mexico 35–11. Drive: 12 plays, 75 yards, 5:37.
- UNM – James Laubstein 1-yard run (Grant Glasgow kick), 1:27. New Mexico 42–11. Drive: 8 plays, 23 yards, 4:19.
- NMSU – Myles Libman 8-yard pass from Adam Damante (Ilya Uvaydov kick), 0:18. New Mexico 42–18. Drive: 7 plays, 75 yards, 1:09.

Statistics	UNM	NMSU
First downs	19	22
Plays–yards	64–430	69–405
Rushes–yards	47–253	31–137
Passing yards	177	268
Passing: comp–att–int	10–17–0	23–38–2
Turnovers	0	3
Time of possession	33:58	26:02

Team	Category	Player	Statistics
New Mexico	Passing	Toa Fa'avae	10/17, 177 yards, TD
New Mexico	Rushing	Scottre Humphrey	19 carries, 104 yards, 2 TD
New Mexico	Receiving	Bailen George	3 receptions, 102 yards
New Mexico State	Passing	Adam Damante	16/19, 162 yards, TD
New Mexico State	Rushing	James Jones	14 carries, 112 yards
New Mexico State	Receiving	Josiah Thomas	5 receptions, 90 yards

=== Western Kentucky ===
Western Kentucky Hilltoppers (1–3) at New Mexico State Aggies (1–3) – Game summary

Quarter	1	2	Total
Hilltoppers			0
Aggies			0

at Aggie Memorial Stadium • Las Cruces, New Mexico

- Date: October 1
- Game time: 7:00 p.m.
- TV: CBS Sports Network

Game information

First quarter
Second quarter
Third quarter
Fourth quarter

Statistics	WKU	NMSU
First downs		
Total yards		
Rushes–yards		
Passing yards		
Passing: Comp–Att–Int		
Turnovers		
Time of possession		

Team	Category	Player	Statistics
Western Kentucky	Passing		
Western Kentucky	Rushing		
Western Kentucky	Receiving		
New Mexico State	Passing		
New Mexico State	Rushing		
New Mexico State	Receiving		

=== at FIU ===
Game Five – New Mexico State Aggies (2–3) at FIU Panthers (2–3) – Game summary

Quarter	1	2	3	4	Total
Aggies	0	0	0	0	0
Panthers	0	0	0	0	0

at Pitbull Stadium • Miami, FL

- Date: October 7
- Game time: 7:30 p.m.
- TV announcers (ESPN2): Cooper Boardman play-by-play and Dave Clawson analyst

Game information

First quarter
Second quarter
Third quarter
Fourth quarter

Statistics	NMSU	FIU
First downs		
Total yards		
Rushing yards		
Passing yards		
Passing: Comp–Att–Int		
Turnovers		
Time of possession		

Team	Category	Player	Statistics
New Mexico State	Passing		
New Mexico State	Rushing		
New Mexico State	Receiving		
FIU	Passing		
FIU	Rushing		
FIU	Receiving		

=== at Sam Houston ===
New Mexico State Aggies (2–4) at Sam Houston Bearkats (1–5) – Game summary

Quarter	1	2	3	4	Total
Aggies	0	0	0	0	0
Bearkats	0	0	0	0	0

at Bowers Stadium • Huntsville, Texas

- Date: October 21
- Game time: 7:00 p.m.
- TV: ESPN 2

Game information

First quarter
Second quarter
Third quarter
Fourth quarter

Statistics	NMSU	SHSU
First downs		
Total yards		
Rushes–yards		
Passing yards		
Passing: Comp–Att–Int		
Turnovers		
Time of possession		

Team	Category	Player	Statistics
New Mexico State	Passing		
New Mexico State	Rushing		
New Mexico State	Receiving		
Sam Houston	Passing		
Sam Houston	Rushing		
Sam Houston	Receiving		

=== Jacksonville State ===
Jacksonville State Gamecocks (5–2) at New Mexico State Aggies (3–4) – Game summary

Quarter	1	2	3	4	Total
Gamecocks	0	7	10	7	24
Aggies	0	0	0	0	0

at Aggie Memorial Stadium • Las Cruces, New Mexico

- Date: October 28
- Game time: 7:00 p.m.
- Game weather: Sunny • Temperature: 79 °F (26 °C)
- Game attendance: 6,511
- Referee: Jeremee Tate
- TV announcers (ESPN2): Clay Matvick (play-by-play) and Rocky Boiman (analyst)

Game information

First quarter

- No scoring plays.

Second quarter

- JVST – Caden Creel 3-yard run (Garrison Rippa kick), 12:33. Jacksonville State 7–0. Drive: 12 plays, 80 yards, 7:06.

Third quarter

- JVST – Garrison Rippa 49-yard field goal, 10:08. Jacksonville State 10–0. Drive: 7 plays, 23 yards, 3:36.
- JVST – Jalen Likely 1-yard run (Garrison Rippa kick), 2:31. Jacksonville State 17–0. Drive: 2 plays, 85 yards, 0:15.

Fourth quarter

- JVST – Luke Gilbert 29-yard pass from Caden Creel (Carter Lewis kick), 4:48. Jacksonville State 24–0. Drive: 12 plays, 87 yards, 7:59.

Statistics	JVST	NMSU
First downs	23	11
Plays–yards	64–433	54–221
Rushes–yards	46–324	34–192
Passing yards	109	29
Passing: comp–att–int	11–17–2	6–19–1
Turnovers	2	1
Time of possession	35:18	24:42

Team	Category	Player	Statistics
Jacksonville State	Passing	Caden Creel	11/17, 109 yards, TD, 2 INT
Jacksonville State	Rushing	Caden Creel	21 carries, 211 yards, TD
Jacksonville State	Receiving	Luke Gilbert	5 receptions, 67 yards, TD
New Mexico State	Passing	Adam Damante	6/19, 29 yards, INT
New Mexico State	Rushing	James Jones	20 carries, 112 yards
New Mexico State	Receiving	Brodie Malone-Bradford	3 receptions, 19 yards

=== Liberty ===
Liberty Flames (7-1) at New Mexico State Aggies (3-5) - Game summary

Quarter	1	2	3	4	Total
Flames	0	0	0	0	0
Aggies	0	0	0	0	0

at Aggie Memorial Stadium • Las Cruces, New Mexico

- Date: November 7
- Game time: 5:00 p.m. ET

Game information

First quarter
Second quarter
Third quarter
Fourth quarter

Statistics	LIB	NMSU
First downs		
Plays–yards		
Rushes–yards		
Passing yards		
Passing: comp–att–int		
Turnovers		
Time of possession		

Team	Category	Player	Statistics
Liberty	Passing		
Liberty	Rushing		
Liberty	Receiving		
New Mexico State	Passing		
New Mexico State	Rushing		
New Mexico State	Receiving		

=== at Missouri State ===
New Mexico State Aggies (3–6) at Missouri State Bears (3–6) – Game summary

Quarter	1	2	3	4	Total
Aggies	0	0	0	0	0
Bears	0	0	0	0	0

at Robert W. Plaster Stadium • Springfield, Missouri

- Date: November 14
- Game time: 1:00 p.m. MST

Game information

First quarter
Second quarter
Third quarter
Fourth quarter

Statistics	NMSU	MOST
First downs		
Plays–yards		
Rushes–yards		
Passing yards		
Passing: comp–att–int		
Turnovers		
Time of possession		

Team	Category	Player	Statistics
New Mexico State	Passing		
New Mexico State	Rushing		
New Mexico State	Receiving		
Missouri State	Passing		
Missouri State	Rushing		
Missouri State	Receiving		

=== Delaware ===
Delaware Fightin' Blue Hens (5-5) at New Mexico State Aggies (3-7) - Game summary

Quarter	1	2	3	4	Total
Fightin' Blue Hens	0	0	0	0	0
Aggies	0	0	0	0	0

at Aggie Memorial Stadium • Las Cruces, New Mexico

- Date: November 21
- Game time: TBD p.m. EDT

Game information

First quarter
Second quarter
Third quarter
Fourth quarter

Statistics	DEL	NMSU
First downs		
Plays–yards		
Rushes–yards		
Passing yards		
Passing: comp–att–int		
Turnovers		
Time of possession		

Team	Category	Player	Statistics
Delaware	Passing		
Delaware	Rushing		
Delaware	Receiving		
New Mexico State	Passing		
New Mexico State	Rushing		
New Mexico State	Receiving		

=== at Middle Tennessee ===
New Mexico State Aggies (0–0) at Middle Tennessee Blue Raiders (0–0) – Game summary

Quarter	1	2	Total
Aggies			0
Blue Raiders			0

at Johnny "Red" Floyd Stadium • Murfreesboro, Tennessee

- Date: November 28
- Game time: 12:00 p.m. MST
- TV: ESPN Platforms

Game information

First quarter
Second quarter
Third quarter
Fourth quarter

Statistics	NMSU	MTSU
First downs		
Total yards		
Rushes–yards		
Passing yards		
Passing: Comp–Att–Int		
Turnovers		
Time of possession		

Team	Category	Player	Statistics
New Mexico State	Passing		
New Mexico State	Rushing		
New Mexico State	Receiving		
Middle Tennessee	Passing		
Middle Tennessee	Rushing		
Middle Tennessee	Receiving		
