= 2026 Middle Tennessee Blue Raiders football team =

American college football season

2026 Middle Tennessee Blue Raiders football
- Conference: Conference USA
- Record: 6–5 (4–3 CUSA)
- Head coach: Derek Mason (3rd season)
- Offensive coordinator: Anthony Scelfo (1st season)
- Offensive scheme: Multiple
- Defensive coordinator: Brian Stewart (3rd season)
- Base defense: 3–4
- Home stadium: Johnny "Red" Floyd Stadium

2026 Conference USA football standings
| | Conf. | | | Overall |
| Team | W | | L | W | | L |
|---|---|---|---|---|---|---|
| Liberty y | 7 | – | 0 | 9 | – | 1 |
| Jacksonville State y | 6 | – | 1 | 8 | – | 3 |
| Kennesaw State | 4 | – | 3 | 5 | – | 6 |
| Middle Tennessee | 4 | – | 3 | 6 | – | 5 |
| Delaware | 4 | – | 3 | 6 | – | 5 |
| Western Kentucky | 3 | – | 4 | 4 | – | 7 |
| Missouri State | 3 | – | 4 | 4 | – | 7 |
| FIU | 2 | – | 5 | 4 | – | 7 |
| New Mexico State | 2 | – | 5 | 3 | – | 8 |
| Sam Houston | 0 | – | 7 | 1 | – | 10 |
Championship: Jacksonville State at Liberty
y – Championship game participant; As of November 22, 2026; Rankings from AP poll

The 2026 Middle Tennessee Blue Raiders football team represents Middle Tennessee State University as a member of Conference USA (CUSA) during the 2026 NCAA Division I FBS football season. The Blue Raiders are led by Derek Mason in his 3rd year as the head coach. The Blue Raiders play their home games at Johnny "Red" Floyd Stadium, located in Murfreesboro, Tennessee.

== Schedule ==
| Date | Time | Opponent | Site | TV | Result | Attendance |
|---|---|---|---|---|---|---|
| September 5 | 6:00 p.m. | Murray State* | Johnny "Red" Floyd Stadium; Murfreesboro, TN | ESPN+ | W 38–14 | 16,227 |
| September 12 | 6:00 p.m. | at Marshall* | Joan C. Edwards Stadium; Huntington, WV | ESPN+ | L 26–28 | 25,662 |
| September 19 | 6:00 p.m. | Nevada* | Johnny "Red" Floyd Stadium; Murfreesboro, TN | ESPN+ | W 27–20 | 16,106 |
| September 26 | 6:00 p.m. | at Jacksonville State | AmFirst Stadium; Jacksonville, AL | ESPN+ | L 13–23 | 16,977 |
| October 3 | 11:00 a.m. | at Kansas* | David Booth Kansas Memorial Stadium; Lawrence, KS | ESPNU | L 0–55 | 32,000 |
| October 13 | 6:00 p.m. | Delaware | Johnny "Red" Floyd Stadium; Murfreesboro, TN | CBSSN | W 33–30 | 8,606 |
| October 20 | 6:00 p.m. | at FIU | Pitbull Stadium; Miami, FL | CBSSN | W 26–23 | 8,230 |
| October 28 | 6:00 p.m. | Kennesaw State | Johnny "Red" Floyd Stadium; Murfreesboro, TN | CBSSN | L 28–44 | 10,005 |
| November 7 | 2:30 p.m. | Western Kentucky^{†} | Johnny "Red" Floyd Stadium; Murfreesboro, TN (100 Miles of Hate) | ESPN+ | W 51–42 | 12,127 |
| November 14 | 2:30 p.m. | at Liberty | Williams Stadium; Lynchburg, VA | CBSSN | L 23–28 | 15,131 |
| November 21 | 1:00 p.m. | at Sam Houston | Bowers Stadium; Huntsville, TX | ESPN+ | W 31–28 | 7,432 |
| November 28 | 1:00 p.m. | New Mexico State | Johnny "Red" Floyd Stadium; Murfreesboro, TN | ESPN+ | | |
*Non-conference game; ^{†}Homecoming; All times are in Central time

== Game summaries ==
=== Murray State (FCS) ===
Murray State Racers (FCS) (0–1) at Middle Tennessee Blue Raiders (0–0) – Game summary

| Quarter | 1 | 2 | 3 | 4 | Total |
|---|---|---|---|---|---|
| Racers (FCS) | 0 | 7 | 7 | 0 | 14 |
| Blue Raiders | 14 | 7 | 3 | 14 | 38 |

at Johnny "Red" Floyd Stadium • Murfreesboro, Tennessee

- Date: September 5
- Game time: 6:00 p.m.
- Game weather: Cloudy • Temperature: 96 °F (36 °C) • Wind: NW at 5 miles per hour (8.0 km/h)
- Game attendance: 16,227
- Referee: Douglas Mercer
- TV announcers (ESPN+): Jake Rose, Jeremy Kellem and Jill Jelnick

Game information

First quarter

- MTSU – Neo Clifton 10-yard pass from Roman Gagliano (Dominic Bourgeois kick), 5:46. Blue Raiders 7–0. Drive: 6 plays, 56 yards, 3:50.
- MTSU – Cam'ron Lacy 22-yard pass from Roman Gagliano (Dominic Bourgeois kick), 0:22. Blue Raiders 14–0. Drive: 6 plays, 53 yards, 3:03.

Second quarter

- MUR – Tyrell Campbell 46-yard run (Rocco Devita kick), 7:18. Blue Raiders 14–7. Drive: 9 plays, 84 yards, 3:41.
- MTSU – Roman Gagliano 22-yard run (Dominic Bourgeois kick), 3:34. Blue Raiders 21–7. Drive: 7 plays, 75 yards, 3:44.

Third quarter

- MTSU – Dominic Bourgeois 45-yard field goal, 11:17. Blue Raiders 24–7. Drive: 6 plays, 32 yards, 2:45.
- MUR – Jawaun Northington 1-yard run (Rocco Devita kick), 4:47. Blue Raiders 24–14. Drive: 11 plays, 79 yards, 6:27.

Fourth quarter

- MTSU – Terrence Brown 15-yard run (Dominic Bourgeois kick), 14:53. Blue Raiders 31–14. Drive: 9 plays, 71 yards, 4:43.
- MTSU – Kalen Woods 39-yard fumble return (Dominic Bourgeois kick), 13:45. Blue Raiders 38–14.

| Statistics | MUR | MTSU |
|---|---|---|
| First downs | 16 | 21 |
| Plays–yards | 49–290 | 48–396 |
| Rushes–yards | 27–145 | 22–196 |
| Passing yards | 145 | 200 |
| Passing: comp–att–int | 13–22–0 | 20–26–0 |
| Turnovers | 1 | 0 |
| Time of possession | 34:18 | 25:42 |

| Team | Category | Player | Statistics |
|---|---|---|---|
| Murray State | Passing | Jim Ogle | 11/16, 118 yards |
| Murray State | Rushing | Tyrell Campbell | 8 carries, 75 yards, TD |
| Murray State | Receiving | Dimitri Howard | 3 receptions, 49 yards |
| Middle Tennessee | Passing | Roman Gagliano | 20/26, 200 yards, 2 TD |
| Middle Tennessee | Rushing | Antonio Martin | 15 carries, 103 yards |
| Middle Tennessee | Receiving | Cam'ron Lacy | 8 receptions, 118 yards, TD |

=== at Marshall ===
Middle Tennessee Blue Raiders (1–0) at Marshall Thundering Herd (0–1) – Game summary

| Quarter | 1 | 2 | 3 | 4 | Total |
|---|---|---|---|---|---|
| Blue Raiders | 7 | 6 | 7 | 6 | 26 |
| Thundering Herd | 7 | 7 | 0 | 14 | 28 |

at Joan C. Edwards Stadium • Huntington, West Virginia

- Date: September 12
- Game time: 7:00 p.m.
- Game weather: Sunny
- Game attendance: 25,662
- Referee: Reed Brotherton
- TV announcers (ESPN+): Keith Morehouse (play-by-play) and Mark Martin (analyst)

Game information

First quarter

- (10:36) MRSH – Xayvion Turner-Bradshaw 69 yard pass from Carlos Del Rio-Wilson, Jorge Diaz Nicolas kick (Drive: 4 plays, 84 yards, 1:30; Marshall 7–0)
- (9:08) MTSU – Kalen Woods 1 yard fumble recovery, Dominic Bourgeois kick (Tied 7–7)

Second quarter

- (14:54) MTSU – Dominic Bourgeois 52 yard field goal (Drive: 10 plays, 52 yards, 6:47; Middle Tennessee 10–7)
- (8:31) MRSH – Carlos Del Rio-Wilson 4 yard run, Jorge Diaz Nicolas kick (Drive: 11 plays, 75 yards, 6:22; Marshall 14–10)
- (3:50) MTSU – Dominic Bourgeois 35 yard field goal (Drive: 10 plays, 58 yards, 4:41; Marshall 14–13)

Third quarter

- (5:36) MTSU – Cam'ron Lacy 11 yard pass from Roman Gagliano, Dominic Bourgeois kick (Drive: 10 plays, 52 yards, 6:47; Middle Tennessee 20–14)

Fourth quarter

- (12:06) MRSH – Xayvion Turner-Bradshaw 0 yard run, Jorge Diaz Nicolas kick (Drive: 10 plays, 68 yards, 3:38; Marshall 21–20)
- (4:18) MRSH – TJ Lester 2 yard run, Jorge Diaz Nicolas kick (Drive: 1 play, 2 yards, 0:05; Marshall 28–20)
- (0:50) MTSU – AJ Jones 15 yard pass from Roman Gagliano, Roman Galiano pass failed (Drive: 10 plays, 75 yards, 3:28; Marshall 28–26)

| Statistics | MTSU | MRSH |
|---|---|---|
| First downs | 22 | 19 |
| Plays–yards | 69–352 | 61–310 |
| Rushes–yards | 22–109 | 38–129 |
| Passing yards | 243 | 181 |
| Passing: comp–att–int | 25–47–1 | 15–23–0 |
| Turnovers | 1 | 1 |
| Time of possession | 32:46 | 27:14 |

| Team | Category | Player | Statistics |
|---|---|---|---|
| Middle Tennessee | Passing | Roman Gagliano | 25/47, 243 yards, 2 TD, INT |
| Middle Tennessee | Rushing | Roman Gagliano | 8 carries, 58 yards |
| Middle Tennessee | Receiving | Cam'ron Lacy | 9 receptions, 72 yards |
| Marshall | Passing | Carlos Del Rio-Wilson | 7/8, 93 yards, TD |
| Marshall | Rushing | Carlos Del Río-Wilson | 10 carries, 43 yards, TD |
| Marshall | Receiving | Xayvion Turner-Bradshaw | 2 receptions, 79 yards, TD |

=== Nevada ===
Nevada Wolf Pack (1–1) at Middle Tennessee Blue Raiders (1–1) – Game summary

| Quarter | 1 | 2 | 3 | 4 | Total |
|---|---|---|---|---|---|
| Wolf Pack | 7 | 3 | 7 | 3 | 20 |
| Blue Raiders | 7 | 3 | 7 | 10 | 27 |

at Johnny "Red" Floyd Stadium • Murfreesboro, Tennessee

- Date: September 19
- Game time: 6:00 p.m. CDT
- Game weather: Sunny • Temperature: 88 °F (31 °C) • Wind: SE at 3 miles per hour
- Game attendance: 16,106
- Referee: Douglas Mercer
- TV announcers (ESPN+): Jake Rose (play-by-play), Jeremy Kellem (analyst) and Emmy Fazenbaker (sideline)

Game information

First quarter
Second quarter
Third quarter
Fourth quarter

| Statistics | NEV | MTSU |
|---|---|---|
| First downs | 15 | 19 |
| Plays–yards | 58–280 | 67–330 |
| Rushes–yards | 33–95 | 38–157 |
| Passing yards | 185 | 173 |
| Passing: comp–att–int | 15–25–1 | 16–29–0 |
| Turnovers | 3 | 0 |
| Time of possession | 25:32 | 34:28 |

| Team | Category | Player | Statistics |
|---|---|---|---|
| Nevada | Passing | Carter Jones | 15/25, 185 yards, INT |
| Nevada | Rushing | Dominic Kelley | 13 carries, 45 yards, TD |
| Nevada | Receiving | Damien Morgan | 4 receptions, 60 yards |
| Middle Tennessee | Passing | Roman Gagliano | 16/29, 173 yards, 2 TD |
| Middle Tennessee | Rushing | Antonio Martin Jr. | 23 carries, 104 yards, TD |
| Middle Tennessee | Receiving | Markus Allen | 3 receptions, 65 yards |

=== at Jacksonville State ===
Middle Tennessee Blue Raiders (2–1) at Jacksonville State Gamecocks (2–2) – Game summary

| Quarter | 1 | 2 | 3 | 4 | Total |
|---|---|---|---|---|---|
| Blue Raiders | 0 | 7 | 6 | 0 | 13 |
| Gamecocks | 3 | 7 | 10 | 3 | 23 |

at AmFirst Stadium • Jacksonville, Alabama

- Date: September 26
- Game time: 6:00 p.m.
- Game weather: Sunny • Temperature: 78 °F (26 °C) • Wind: N at 6 miles per hour (9.7 km/h)
- Game attendance: 16,977
- Referee: Ron Hudson
- TV announcers (ESPN+): Eli Gold (play-by-play), Jeff Burger (analyst) and Erica Schoeman (sideline)

Game information

First quarter

- JVST – Garrison Rippa 27-yard field goal, 7:14. Jacksonville State 3–0. Drive: 8 plays, 67 yards, 3:59.

Second quarter

- JVST – Caden Creel 1-yard run (Garrison Rippa kick), 6:50. Jacksonville State 10–0. Drive: 9 plays, 62 yards, 3:40.
- MTSU – Cam'ron Lacy 5-yard pass from Roman Gagliano (Dominic Bourgeois kick), 0:27. Jacksonville State 10–7. Drive: 14 plays, 90 yards, 6:17.

Third quarter

- MTSU – Markus Allen 32-yard pass from Roman Gagliano (Two-point run conversion failed), 10:11. Middle Tennessee 13–10. Drive: 9 plays, 75 yards, 4:49.
- JVST – Garrison Rippa 31-yard field goal, 5:43. Tied 13–13. Drive: 10 plays, 62 yards, 4:28.
- JVST – Deondre Johnson 38-yard pass from Caden Creel (Garrison Rippa kick), 5:43. Jacksonville State 20–13. Drive: 7 plays, 76 yards, 3:27.

Fourth quarter

- JVST – Garrison Rippa 29-yard field goal, 2:46. Jacksonville State 23–13. Drive: 12 plays, 69 yards, 7:17.

| Statistics | MTSU | JVST |
|---|---|---|
| First downs | 20 | 25 |
| Plays–yards | 58–319 | 70–517 |
| Rushes–yards | 30–103 | 39–276 |
| Passing yards | 103 | 276 |
| Passing: comp–att–int | 18–28–0 | 19–27–2 |
| Turnovers | 0 | 2 |
| Time of possession | 27:22 | 32:38 |

| Team | Category | Player | Statistics |
|---|---|---|---|
| Middle Tennessee | Passing | Roman Gagliano | 18/28, 216 yards, 2 TD |
| Middle Tennessee | Rushing | Antonio Martin | 17 carries, 106 yards |
| Middle Tennessee | Receiving | Cam'ron Lacy | 8 receptions, 88 yards, TD |
| Jacksonville State | Passing | Caden Creel | 19/27, 241 yards, TD, 2 INT |
| Jacksonville State | Rushing | Caden Creel | 12 carries, 119 yards, TD |
| Jacksonville State | Receiving | Darius Cannon | 6 receptions, 48 yards |

=== at Kansas ===
Middle Tennessee Blue Raiders (2–2) at Kansas Jayhawks (1–2) – Game summary

| Quarter | 1 | 2 | 3 | 4 | Total |
|---|---|---|---|---|---|
| Blue Raiders | 0 | 0 | 0 | 0 | 0 |
| Jayhawks | 3 | 17 | 14 | 21 | 55 |

at David Booth Kansas Memorial Stadium • Lawrence, Kansas

- Date: October 3
- Game time: 11:00 a.m.
- Game weather: Sunny • Temperature: 63 °F (17 °C) • Wind: SE at 7 miles per hour (11 km/h)
- Game attendance: 32,000
- Referee: Tutashinda Salaam
- TV announcers (ESPNU): Mark Neely (play-by-play) and Jay Walker (analyst)

Game information

First quarter

- KU – Martin Connington 43-yard field goal, 6:03. Jayhawks 3–0. Drive: 10 plays, 55 yards, 4:47.

Second quarter

- KU – Dylan Edwards 6-yard run (Martin Connington kick), 13:13. Jayhawks 10–0. Drive: 13 plays, 75 yards, 5:48.
- KU – Dylan Edwards 5-yard run (Martin Connington kick), 4:23. Jayhawks 17–0. Drive: 5 plays, 60 yards, 2:07.
- KU – Martin Connington 35-yard field goal, 0:11. Jayhawks 20–0. Drive: 9 plays, 43 yards, 2:12.

Third quarter

- KU – Dylan Edwards 12-yard run (Martin Connington kick), 12:20. Jayhawks 27–0. Drive: 6 plays, 48 yards, 2:39.
- KU – Nahzae Cox 34-yard pass from Isaiah Marshall (Martin Connington kick), 3:47. Jayhawks 34–0. Drive: 6 plays, 91 yards, 3:10.

Fourth quarter

- KU – Jalen Dupree 5-yard run (Martin Connington kick), 12:21. Jayhawks 41–0. Drive: 10 plays, 58 yards, 5:40.
- KU – Chase Jenkins 14-yard run (Martin Connington kick), 8:35. Jayhawks 48–0. Drive: 5 plays, 91 yards, 2:48.
- KU – Khijohnn Cummings-Coleman 24-yard run (Martin Connington kick), 5:22. Jayhawks 55–0. Drive: 4 plays, 71 yards, 2:12.

| Statistics | MTSU | KU |
|---|---|---|
| First downs | 7 | 36 |
| Plays–yards | 42–136 | 83–706 |
| Rushes–yards | 16–55 | 58–480 |
| Passing yards | 81 | 226 |
| Passing: comp–att–int | 9–26–0 | 16–25–0 |
| Turnovers | 1 | 0 |
| Time of possession | 19:05 | 40:55 |

| Team | Category | Player | Statistics |
|---|---|---|---|
| Middle Tennessee | Passing | Roman Gagliano | 9/26, 81 yards |
| Middle Tennessee | Rushing | Antonio Martin Jr. | 8 carries, 40 yards |
| Middle Tennessee | Receiving | Ziyon Butler | 2 receptions, 44 yards |
| Kansas | Passing | Isaiah Marshall | 13/22, 161 yards, TD |
| Kansas | Rushing | Dylan Edwards | 20 carries, 137 yards, 3 TD |
| Kansas | Receiving | Bryson Hayes | 3 receptions, 50 yards |

=== Delaware ===
Delaware Fightin' Blue Hens (2–3) at Middle Tennessee Blue Raiders (2–3) – Game summary

| Quarter | 1 | 2 | 3 | 4 | Total |
|---|---|---|---|---|---|
| Fightin' Blue Hens | 0 | 0 | 0 | 0 | 0 |
| Blue Raiders | 0 | 0 | 0 | 0 | 0 |

at Johnny "Red" Floyd Stadium • Murfreesboro, Tennessee

- Date: October 13
- Game time: TBD p.m. EDT

Game information

First quarter
Second quarter
Third quarter
Fourth quarter

| Statistics | DEL | MTSU |
|---|---|---|
| First downs | | |
| Plays–yards | | |
| Rushes–yards | | |
| Passing yards | | |
| Passing: comp–att–int | | |
| Turnovers | | |
| Time of possession | | |

| Team | Category | Player | Statistics |
|---|---|---|---|
| Delaware | Passing | | |
| Delaware | Rushing | | |
| Delaware | Receiving | | |
| Middle Tennessee | Passing | | |
| Middle Tennessee | Rushing | | |
| Middle Tennessee | Receiving | | |

=== at FIU ===
Middle Tennessee Blue Raiders (3–3) at FIU Panthers (3–3) – Game summary

| Quarter | 1 | 2 | 3 | 4 | Total |
|---|---|---|---|---|---|
| Blue Raiders | 0 | 0 | 0 | 0 | 0 |
| Panthers | 0 | 0 | 0 | 0 | 0 |

at Pitbull Stadium • Miami, FL

- Date: October 20
- Game time: 7:00 p.m.
- TV: CBSSN

Game information

First quarter
Second quarter
Third quarter
Fourth quarter

| Statistics | MTSU | FIU |
|---|---|---|
| First downs | | |
| Total yards | | |
| Rushing yards | | |
| Passing yards | | |
| Passing: Comp–Att–Int | | |
| Turnovers | | |
| Time of possession | | |

| Team | Category | Player | Statistics |
|---|---|---|---|
| Middle Tennessee | Passing | | |
| Middle Tennessee | Rushing | | |
| Middle Tennessee | Receiving | | |
| FIU | Passing | | |
| FIU | Rushing | | |
| FIU | Receiving | | |

=== Kennessaw State ===
Kennesaw State Owls (1–6) at Middle Tennessee Blue Raiders (4–3) – Game summary

| Quarter | 1 | 2 | 3 | 4 | Total |
|---|---|---|---|---|---|
| Owls | 0 | 0 | 0 | 0 | 0 |
| Blue Raiders | 0 | 0 | 0 | 0 | 0 |

at Johnny "Red" Floyd Stadium • Murfreesboro, TN

- Date: October 28
- Game time: 7:00 p.m.
- TV: CBSSN

Game information

First quarter
Second quarter
Third quarter
Fourth quarter

| Statistics | KENN | MTSU |
|---|---|---|
| First downs | | |
| Plays–yards | | |
| Rushes–yards | | |
| Passing yards | | |
| Passing: Comp–Att–Int | | |
| Turnovers | | |
| Time of possession | | |

| Team | Category | Player | Statistics |
|---|---|---|---|
| Kennesaw State | Passing | | |
| Kennesaw State | Rushing | | |
| Kennesaw State | Receiving | | |
| Middle Tennessee | Passing | | |
| Middle Tennessee | Rushing | | |
| Middle Tennessee | Receiving | | |

=== Western Kentucky (100 Miles of Hate) ===
Western Kentucky Hilltoppers (3–5) at Middle Tennessee Blue Raiders (4–4) – Game summary

| Quarter | 1 | 2 | Total |
|---|---|---|---|
| Hilltoppers | | | 0 |
| Blue Raiders | | | 0 |

at Johnny "Red" Floyd Stadium • Murfreesboro, Tennessee

- Date: November 7
- Game time: 2:30 p.m.
- TV: ESPN Platforms

Game information

First quarter
Second quarter
Third quarter
Fourth quarter

| Statistics | WKU | MTSU |
|---|---|---|
| First downs | | |
| Total yards | | |
| Rushes–yards | | |
| Passing yards | | |
| Passing: Comp–Att–Int | | |
| Turnovers | | |
| Time of possession | | |

| Team | Category | Player | Statistics |
|---|---|---|---|
| Western Kentucky | Passing | | |
| Western Kentucky | Rushing | | |
| Western Kentucky | Receiving | | |
| Middle Tennessee | Passing | | |
| Middle Tennessee | Rushing | | |
| Middle Tennessee | Receiving | | |

=== at Liberty ===
Middle Tennessee Blue Raiders (5–4) at Liberty Flames (8–1) – Game summary

| Quarter | 1 | 2 | 3 | 4 | Total |
|---|---|---|---|---|---|
| Blue Raiders | 0 | 0 | 0 | 0 | 0 |
| Flames | 0 | 0 | 0 | 0 | 0 |

at Williams Stadium • Lynchburg, Virginia

- Date: November 14
- Game time: 3:30 p.m. ET
- TV: CBSSN

Game information

First quarter
Second quarter
Third quarter
Fourth quarter

| Statistics | MTSU | LIB |
|---|---|---|
| First downs | | |
| Plays–yards | | |
| Rushes–yards | | |
| Passing yards | | |
| Passing: comp–att–int | | |
| Turnovers | | |
| Time of possession | | |

| Team | Category | Player | Statistics |
|---|---|---|---|
| Middle Tennessee | Passing | | |
| Middle Tennessee | Rushing | | |
| Middle Tennessee | Receiving | | |
| Liberty | Passing | | |
| Liberty | Rushing | | |
| Liberty | Receiving | | |

=== at Sam Houston ===
Middle Tennessee Blue Raiders (5–5) at Sam Houston Bearkats (1–9) – Game summary

| Quarter | 1 | 2 | 3 | 4 | Total |
|---|---|---|---|---|---|
| Blue Raiders | 0 | 0 | 0 | 0 | 0 |
| Bearkats | 0 | 0 | 0 | 0 | 0 |

at Bowers Stadium • Huntsville, Texas

- Date: November 21
- Game time: 1:00 p.m.

Game information

First quarter
Second quarter
Third quarter
Fourth quarter

| Statistics | MTSU | SHSU |
|---|---|---|
| First downs | | |
| Total yards | | |
| Rushes–yards | | |
| Passing yards | | |
| Passing: Comp–Att–Int | | |
| Turnovers | | |
| Time of possession | | |

| Team | Category | Player | Statistics |
|---|---|---|---|
| Middle Tennessee | Passing | | |
| Middle Tennessee | Rushing | | |
| Middle Tennessee | Receiving | | |
| Sam Houston | Passing | | |
| Sam Houston | Rushing | | |
| Sam Houston | Receiving | | |

=== New Mexico State ===
New Mexico State Aggies (0–0) at Middle Tennessee Blue Raiders (0–0) – Game summary

| Quarter | 1 | 2 | Total |
|---|---|---|---|
| Aggies | | | 0 |
| Blue Raiders | | | 0 |

at Johnny "Red" Floyd Stadium • Murfreesboro, Tennessee

- Date: November 28
- Game time: 12:00 p.m. MST
- TV: ESPN Platforms

Game information

First quarter
Second quarter
Third quarter
Fourth quarter

| Statistics | NMSU | MTSU |
|---|---|---|
| First downs | | |
| Total yards | | |
| Rushes–yards | | |
| Passing yards | | |
| Passing: Comp–Att–Int | | |
| Turnovers | | |
| Time of possession | | |

| Team | Category | Player | Statistics |
|---|---|---|---|
| New Mexico State | Passing | | |
| New Mexico State | Rushing | | |
| New Mexico State | Receiving | | |
| Middle Tennessee | Passing | | |
| Middle Tennessee | Rushing | | |
| Middle Tennessee | Receiving | | |
