= Toa Fa'avae =

American football player (born 2006)

No. 13 – New Mexico Lobos
- Position: Quarterback
- Class: Sophomore

Personal information
- Born: November 11, 2006 (age 19)
- Listed height: 6 ft 0 in (1.83 m)
- Listed weight: 188 lb (85 kg)

Career information
- High school: De La Salle (Concord, California)
- College: New Mexico (2025–present)
- Stats at ESPN

Toa Fa'avae (born November 11, 2006) is an American college football quarterback for the New Mexico Lobos.

== Early life ==
Fa'avae attended De La Salle High School in Concord, California. A three-star recruit, he flipped his commitment to play college football from Idaho to the University of New Mexico after Jason Eck was hired as the Lobos' head coach.

== College career ==
After making an appearance as a freshman, Fa'avae competed with Luka Moga for the Lobos' starting quarterback position after returning starter Jack Layne was ruled out for the season. After splitting time with Moga through the first three games of the season, Fa'avae was named the starting quarterback for the remainder of the season. In his first start as the sole starter, he threw for 177 yards and a touchdown in a 42–18 victory over rival New Mexico State. Against UTEP, he completed 15 passes for 249 yards and three touchdowns, leading New Mexico to a 61–7 victory and earning Mountain West Freshman of the Week honors.

=== Statistics ===
| Season | Team | Games | | | Passing | | | | | | | | Rushing | | | |
| Season | Team | GP | GS | Record | Comp | Att | Pct | Yards | Avg | TD | Int | Rate | Att | Yards | Avg | TD |
|---|---|---|---|---|---|---|---|---|---|---|---|---|---|---|---|---|
| 2025 | New Mexico | 1 | 0 | – | – | – | – | – | – | – | – | – | 1 | 2 | 2.0 | 0 |
| 2026 | New Mexico | 9 | 9 | 8–1 | 72 | 121 | 59.5 | 1,041 | 8.6 | 7 | 7 | 139.3 | 84 | 319 | 3.8 | 2 |
| Career | | 10 | 9 | 8−1 | 72 | 121 | 59.5 | 1,041 | 8.6 | 7 | 7 | 139.3 | 85 | 321 | 3.8 | 2 |
