= 2026 Wyoming Cowboys football team =

American college football season

2026 Wyoming Cowboys football
- Conference: Mountain West Conference
- Record: 7–4 (6–2 MW)
- Head coach: Jay Sawvel (3rd season)
- Offensive coordinator: Christian Taylor (1st season)
- Offensive scheme: Multiple
- Defensive coordinator: Aaron Bohl (3rd season)
- Base defense: 4–2–5
- Home stadium: War Memorial Stadium

2026 Mountain West Conference football standings
	Conf.			Overall
Team	W		L	W		L
New Mexico	6	–	1	9	–	2
Wyoming	6	–	2	7	–	4
North Dakota State	5	–	2	8	–	2
Air Force	5	–	2	9	–	2
UNLV	4	–	2	6	–	4
Nevada	3	–	3	4	–	6
San Jose State	3	–	4	5	–	6
Hawaii	2	–	5	3	–	7
Northern Illinois	0	–	6	0	–	10
UTEP	0	–	7	1	–	10
Championship: December 4, 2026
As of November 21, 2026; Rankings from CFP rankings

The 2026 Wyoming Cowboys football team is the program that represents the University of Wyoming as they are a member of the Mountain West Conference (MW) during the 2026 NCAA Division I FBS football season. They are led by third-year head coach Jay Sawvel, the Cowboys play their home games on campus, at War Memorial Stadium in Laramie, Wyoming.

== Schedule ==
Date	Time	Opponent	Site	TV	Result	Attendance
September 5	4:00 p.m.	at Colorado State*	Canvas Stadium; Fort Collins, CO (Border War)	USA	L 13–35	40,546
September 12	2:00 p.m.	Northern Colorado (FCS)*	War Memorial Stadium; Laramie, WY	MW+	W 21–13	24,105
September 19	11:00 a.m.	at Central Michigan*	Kelly/Shorts Stadium; Mount Pleasant, MI	ESPN+	L 10–24	15,552
September 26	1:00 p.m.	Hawaii^{†}	War Memorial Stadium; Laramie, WY (rivalry)	The CW	W 27–10	20,999
October 3	1:30 p.m.	at North Dakota State	Fargodome; Fargo, ND (Battle of the Basins)	The CW	L 0–28	18,586
October 9	7:00 p.m.	at San Jose State	CEFCU Stadium; San Jose, CA	CBSSN	W 16–13 ^{OT}	13,104
October 17	1:30 p.m.	Northern Illinois	War Memorial Stadium; Laramie, WY	The CW	W 41–23	20,065
October 23	7:00 p.m.	Air Force	War Memorial Stadium; Laramie, WY	The CW	W 28–14	18,490
November 7	8:30 p.m.	at UNLV	Allegiant Stadium; Paradise, NV	CBSSN	W 41–35	25,277
November 14	8:00 p.m.	at UTEP	Sun Bowl; El Paso, TX	FS1	W 27–15	8,334
November 20	7:00 p.m.	New Mexico	War Memorial Stadium; Laramie, WY	FS1	L 17–24	22,002
November 28	10:00 a.m.	UConn*	War Memorial Stadium; Laramie, WY	FS1		
*Non-conference game; ^{†}Homecoming; All times are in Mountain time; Source:

== Game summaries ==
=== at Colorado State (Border War) ===
Wyoming Cowboys (0–0) at Colorado State Rams (0–0) – Game summary

Quarter	1	2	3	4	Total
Cowboys	3	3	7	0	13
Rams	7	7	7	14	35

at Canvas Stadium • Fort Collins, Colorado

- Date: September 5
- Game time: 4:00 p.m.
- Game weather: Sunny • Temperature: 89 °F (32 °C) • Wind: NW at 8 miles per hour (13 km/h)
- Game attendance: 40,546
- Referee: Preston Clipper
- TV announcers (USA): Nate Gatter, Ryan Leaf and Lauren Green

Game information

First quarter

- CSU – Cedric Russ 6-yard pass from Hauss Hejny (Kali Nguma kick), 10:46. Rams 7–0. Drive: 10 palys, 65 yards, 4:14.
- WYO – Erik Sandvik 37-yard field goal, 2:34. Rams 7–3. Drive: 13 plays, 56 yards, 8:12.

Second quarter

- CSU – Reginald Vick Jr. 3-yard pass from Hauss Hejny (Kali Nguma kick), 1:56. Rams 14–3. Drive: 6 plays, 51 yards, 2:36.
- WYO – Erik Sandvik 48-yard field goal, 0:00. Rams 14–6. Drive: 4 plays, 34 yards, 0:33.

Third quarter

- WYO – Tyler Hughes 9-yard run (Erik Sandvik kick), 10:59. Rams 14–13. Drive: 7 plays, 55 yards, 3:55.
- CSU – Reginald Vick Jr. 57-yard pass from Hauss Hejny (Kali Nguma kick), 4:00. Rams 21–13. Drive: 2 plays, 60 yards, 0:40.

Fourth quarter

- CSU – Jackson Harper 24-yard pass from Hauss Hejny (Kali Nguma kick), 11:22. Rams 28–13. Drive: 12 plays, 75 yards, 5:15.
- CSU – Reginald Vick Jr. 4-yard pass from Hauss Hejny (Kali Nguma kick), 1:05. Rams 35–13. Drive: 15 plays, 88 yards, 7:40.

Statistics	WYO	CSU
First downs	17	18
Plays–yards	53–273	67–396
Rushes–yards	34–143	33–154
Passing yards	130	242
Passing: comp–att–int	12–19–3	24–34–0
Turnovers	3	0
Time of possession	30:41	29:19

Team	Category	Player	Statistics
Wyoming	Passing	Tyler Hughes	12/19, 130 yards, 3 INT
Wyoming	Rushing	Samuel Harris	16 carries, 63 yards
Wyoming	Receiving	Jake Wilson	2 receptions, 51 yards
Colorado State	Passing	Hauss Hejny	23/33, 214 yards, 5 TD
Colorado State	Rushing	Mel Brown	8 carries, 57 yards
Colorado State	Receiving	Reginald Vick Jr.	6 receptions, 75 yards, 3 TD

=== Northern Colorado (FCS) ===
Northern Colorado Bears (FCS) (0–2) at Wyoming Cowboys (0–1) – Game summary

Quarter	1	2	3	4	Total
Bears (FCS)	0	10	3	0	13
Cowboys	0	7	0	14	21

at War Memorial Stadium • Laramie, Wyoming

- Date: September 12
- Game time: 2:00 p.m.
- Game weather: Cloudy • Temperature: 76 °F (24 °C) • Wind: W at 15 miles per hour (24 km/h)
- Game attendance: 24,105
- Referee: Cal McNeill
- TV announcers (MW+): Justin Adams, Jared Petrino and Logan Wilson

Game information

First quarter

No scoring plays.

Second quarter

- WYO – Samuel Harris 4-yard run (Erik Sandvik kick), 7:19. Cowboys 7–0. Drive: 8 plays, 37 yards, 4:44.
- UNCO – Landon Richardson 45-yard field goal, 2:00. Cowboys 7–3. Drive: 9 plays, 49 yards, 5:19.
- UNCO – Marcus Mozer 45-yard pass from Kenny Lueth (Landon Richardson kick), 0:25. Bears 10–7. Drive: 5 plays, 91 yards, 0:58.

Third quarter

- UNCO – Landon Richardson 35-yard field goal, 7:59. Bears 13–7. Drive: 13 plays, 58 yards, 7:01.

Fourth quarter

- WYO – Charlie Coenen 15-yard pass from Tyler Hughes (Erik Sandvik kick), 3:44. Cowboys 14–13. Drive: 14 plays, 82 yards, 7:06.
- WYO – Kyle Frendt 18-yard pass from Tyler Hughes (Erik Sandvik kick), 1:44. Cowboys 21–13. Drive: 5 plays, 38 yards, 0:54.

Statistics	UNCO	WYO
First downs	17	16
Plays–yards	62–345	60–304
Rushes–yards	36–139	34–155
Passing yards	206	149
Passing: comp–att–int	14–26–2	18–26–0
Turnovers	2	2
Time of possession	31:07	28:53

Team	Category	Player	Statistics
Northern Colorado	Passing	Kenny Lueth	13/23, 202 yards, TD, 2 INT
Northern Colorado	Rushing	Justin Guin	17 carries, 88 yards
Northern Colorado	Receiving	Marcus Mozer	3 receptions, 72 yards, TD
Wyoming	Passing	Tyler Hughes	18/26, 149 yards, 2 TD
Wyoming	Rushing	Markell Holman	11 carries, 80 yards
Wyoming	Receiving	Jake Wilson	3 receptions, 35 yards

=== at Central Michigan ===
Wyoming Cowboys (1–1) at Central Michigan Chippewas (1–1) – Game summary

Quarter	1	2	3	4	Total
Cowboys	0	0	3	7	10
Chippewas	3	14	7	0	24

at Kelly/Shorts Stadium • Mount Pleasant, Michigan

- Date: September 19
- Game time: 1:00 p.m.
- Game weather: Rain • Temperature: 59 °F (15 °C)
- Game attendance: 15,552
- Referee: Andrew Speciale
- TV announcers (ESPN+): Doug Sherman and Marcus Ray

Game information

First quarter
Second quarter
Third quarter
Fourth quarter

Statistics	WYO	CMU
First downs	17	20
Plays–yards	59–340	66–371
Rushes–yards	28–160	59–339
Passing yards	180	32
Passing: comp–att–int	15–31–2	4–7–0
Turnovers	2	0
Time of possession	24:12	35:48

Team	Category	Player	Statistics
Wyoming	Passing	Tyler Hughes	14/30, 173 yards, 2 INT
Wyoming	Rushing	Tyler Hughes	10 carries, 78 yards
Wyoming	Receiving	Kyle Frendt	4 receptions, 95 yards
Central Michigan	Passing	Angel Flores	4/7, 32 yards
Central Michigan	Rushing	Angel Flores	28 carries, 163 yards, 2 TD
Central Michigan	Receiving	Shawn Foster	1 reception, 13 yards

=== Hawaii (rivalry) ===
Hawaii Rainbow Warriors (1–2) at Wyoming Cowboys (1–1) – Game summary

Quarter	1	2	3	4	Total
Rainbow Warriors	3	0	0	7	10
Cowboys	3	10	0	14	27

at War Memorial Stadium • Laramie, Wyoming

- Date: September 26
- Game time: 1:00 p.m.
- Game weather: Cloudy • Temperature: 74 °F (23 °C) • Wind: W at 16 miles per hour (26 km/h)
- Game attendance: 20,999
- Referee: Marcus Thornton
- TV announcers (The CW): Chris Fisher (play-by-play), Cody Kessler (analyst) and Marshall Newhouse (sideline)

Game information

First quarter

- WYO – Erik Sandvik 28-yard field goal, 10:13. 11 plays, 64 yards, 4:47. Cowboys 3–0.
- HAW – Sean Olvera-Harle 28-yard field goal, 5:27. 12 plays, 55 yards, 4:46. Tied 3–3.

Second quarter

- WYO – Erik Sandvik 23-yard field goal, 10:04. 11 plays, 65 yards, 5:25. Cowboys 6–3.
- WYO – Markell Holman 1-yard run (Erik Sandvik kick), 3:05. 7 plays, 60 yards, 3:07. Cowboys 13–3.

Fourth quarter

- WYO – Markell Holman 18-yard run (Erik Sandvick kick), 14:52. 11 plays, 99 yards, 5:54. Cowboys 20–3.
- HAW – Devon Tauaefa 20-yard pass from Micah Alejado (Sean Olvera-Harle kick), 12:11. 7 plays, 75 yards, 2:41. Cowboys 20–10.
- WYO – Samuel Harris 18–yard run (Erik Sandvik kick), 1:46. 7 plays, 63 yards, 2:50. Cowboys 27–10.

Statistics	HAW	WYO
First downs	22	23
Plays–yards	67–328	61–387
Rushes–yards	23–102	38–183
Passing yards	226	204
Passing: comp–att–int	28–44–0	17–23–0
Turnovers	0	0
Time of possession	27:57	32:03

Team	Category	Player	Statistics
Hawaii	Passing	Micah Alejado	28/44, 226 yards, TD
Hawaii	Rushing	DeVon Rice	11 carries, 75 yards
Hawaii	Receiving	Tama Uiliata	6 receptions, 39 yards
Wyoming	Passing	Tyler Hughes	17/23, 204 yards
Wyoming	Rushing	Samuel Harris	11 carries, 94 yards, TD
Wyoming	Receiving	Deion DeBlanc	3 receptions, 41 yards

=== at North Dakota State ===
Wyoming Cowboys (2–2) at North Dakota State Bison (4–0) – Game summary

Quarter	1	2	3	4	Total
Cowboys	0	0	0	0	0
Bison	7	10	3	8	28

at Fargodome, Fargo, ND

- Date: October 3, 2026
- Game time: 2:30 p.m.
- Game weather: Indoors; 70 °F (21 °C)
- Game attendance: 18,586
- Referee: Kenneth Ray
- TV announcers (The CW): Jack McMullen (play-by-play), Cody Kessler (analyst), Marshall Newhouse (sideline)

Game information

First quarter

- (12:43) NDSU – Nathan Hayes 8-yard run, Drew Klein kick (Drive: 5 plays, 19 yards, 2:09; North Dakota State 7–0)

Second quarter

- (10:39) NDSU – Nathan Hayes 14-yard run, Drew Klein kick (Drive: 7 plays, 97 yards, 3:28; North Dakota State 14–0)
- (0:20) NDSU – Drew Klein 31-yard field goal (Drive: 12 plays, 68 yards, 3:03; North Dakota State 17–0)

Third quarter

- (8:20) NDSU – Drew Klein 37-yard field goal (Drive: 15 plays, 74 yards, 6:35; North Dakota State 20–0)

Fourth quarter

- (8:50) NDSU – DJ Scott 1-yard run, Jackson Williams rush (Drive: 8 plays, 66 yards, 4:20; North Dakota State 28–0)

Statistics	WYO	NDSU
First downs	8	23
Plays–yards	49–162	70–407
Rushes–yards	35–110	45–220
Passing yards	52	187
Passing: comp–att–int	5–14–1	14–25–0
Turnovers	1	0
Time of possession	26:54	33:06

Team	Category	Player	Statistics
Wyoming	Passing	Tyler Hughes	5/14, 52 yards, INT
Wyoming	Rushing	Tyler Hughes	12 carries, 37 yards
Wyoming	Receiving	Charlie Coenen	1 reception, 16 yards
North Dakota State	Passing	Nathan Hayes	14/25, 187 yards
North Dakota State	Rushing	Nathan Hayes	10 carries, 79 yards, 2 TD
North Dakota State	Receiving	Jackson Williams	4 receptions, 75 yards

=== at San Jose State ===
Wyoming Cowboys (2–3) at San Jose State Spartans (3–2) – Game summary

Quarter	1	2	3	4	Total
Cowboys	0	0	0	0	0
Spartans	0	0	0	0	0

at CEFCU Stadium • San Jose, CA

- Date: October 9, 2026
- Game time: 7:00 p.m.
- Game weather: -
- Game attendance: -
- Referee: -
- TV announcers (CBSSN): Rich Waltz, Adam Breneman and Jordan Giorgio

Game information

First quarter
Second quarter
Third quarter
Fourth quarter

Statistics	WYO	SJSU
First downs		
Plays–yards		
Rushes–yards		
Passing yards		
Passing: comp–att–int		
Turnovers		
Time of possession		

Team	Category	Player	Statistics
Wyoming	Passing		
Wyoming	Rushing		
Wyoming	Receiving		
San Jose State	Passing		
San Jose State	Rushing		
San Jose State	Receiving		

=== Northern Illinois ===
Northern Illinois Huskies (0–5) at Wyoming Cowboys (3–3) – Game summary

Quarter	1	2	3	4	Total
Huskies	0	0	0	0	0
Cowboys	0	0	0	0	0

at War Memorial Stadium • Laramie, Wyoming

- Date: October 17
- Game time: 1:30 p.m.
- TV announcers (The CW): Jack McMullen (play-by-play), Cody Kessler (analyst), Marshall Newhouse (sideline)

Game information

First quarter
Second quarter
Third quarter
Fourth quarter

Statistics	NIU	WYO
First downs		
Plays–yards		
Rushes–yards		
Passing yards		
Passing: Comp–Att–Int		
Turnovers		
Time of possession		

Team	Category	Player	Statistics
Northern Illinois	Passing		
Northern Illinois	Rushing		
Northern Illinois	Receiving		
Wyoming	Passing		
Wyoming	Rushing		
Wyoming	Receiving		

=== Air Force ===
Air Force Falcons (5–1) at Wyoming Cowboys (4–3) – Game summary

Quarter	1	2	3	4	Total
Falcons	3	3	8	0	14
Cowboys	14	7	0	7	28

at War Memorial Stadium • Laramie, Wyoming

- Date: October 23
- Game time: 7:00 p.m.
- TV announcers (The CW): Chris Fisher (play by play), Isaiah Stanback (analyst), & Bryan Walters (reporter)

Game information

First quarter
Second quarter
Third quarter
Fourth quarter

Statistics	AFA	WYO
First downs		
Plays–yards		
Rushes–yards		
Passing yards		
Passing: comp–att–int		
Turnovers		
Time of possession		

Team	Category	Player	Statistics
Air Force	Passing		
Air Force	Rushing		
Air Force	Receiving		
Wyoming	Passing		
Wyoming	Rushing		
Wyoming	Receiving		

=== at UNLV ===
Wyoming Cowboys (5–3) at UNLV Rebels (5–3) – Game summary

Quarter	1	2	3	4	Total
Cowboys	0	0	0	0	0
Rebels	0	0	0	0	0

at Allegiant Stadium • Paradise, Nevada

- Date: November 7
- Game time: 7:30 p.m. PDT
- Game weather: None (indoor stadium)
- TV announcers (CBSSN): Chris Lewis, Doug Pederson and Hailey Sutton

Game information

First quarter
Second quarter
Third quarter
Fourth quarter

Statistics	WYO	UNLV
First downs		
Plays–yards		
Rushes–yards		
Passing yards		
Passing: comp–att–int		
Turnovers		
Time of possession		

Team	Category	Player	Statistics
Wyoming	Passing		
Wyoming	Rushing		
Wyoming	Receiving		
UNLV	Passing		
UNLV	Rushing		
UNLV	Receiving		

=== at UTEP ===
Wyoming Cowboys (6–3) at UTEP Miners (1–8) – Game summary

Quarter	1	2	3	4	Total
Cowboys	0	0	0	0	0
Miners	0	0	0	0	0

at Sun Bowl • El Paso, TX

- Date: November 14, 2026
- Game time: 8:00 PM
- Game weather: -
- Game attendance: -
- Referee: -
- TV announcers (FS1): Neil Sika and Anthony Herron

Game information

First quarter
Second quarter
Third quarter
Fourth quarter

Statistics	WYO	UTEP
First downs		
Plays–yards		
Rushes–yards		
Passing yards		
Passing: comp–att–int		
Turnovers		
Time of possession		

Team	Category	Player	Statistics
Wyoming	Passing		
Wyoming	Rushing		
Wyoming	Receiving		
UTEP	Passing		
UTEP	Rushing		
UTEP	Receiving		

=== New Mexico ===
New Mexico Lobos (8–2) at Wyoming Cowboys (7–3) – Game summary

Quarter	1	2	Total
Lobos			0
Cowboys			0

at War Memorial Stadium • Laramie, Wyoming

- Date: November 20
- Game time: 7:00 PM MDT
- Game weather: TBD
- Game attendance: TBD
- Referee: TBD
- TV announcers (FS1): Evan Lepler and Tanner Morgan

Game information

First quarter

Second quarter

Third quarter

Fourth quarter

Statistics	UNM	WYO
First downs		
Plays–yards		
Rushes–yards		
Passing yards		
Passing: comp–att–int		
Turnovers		
Time of possession		

Team	Category	Player	Statistics
New Mexico	Passing		
New Mexico	Rushing		
New Mexico	Receiving		
Wyoming	Passing		
Wyoming	Rushing		
Wyoming	Receiving		

=== UConn ===
UConn Huskies (0–0) at Wyoming Cowboys (0–0) – Game summary

Quarter	1	2	3	4	Total
Huskies	0	0	0	0	0
Cowboys	0	0	0	0	0

at War Memorial Stadium • Laramie, Wyoming

- Date: November 28
- Game time: 10:00 a.m.
- TV: FS1

Game information

First quarter
Second quarter
Third quarter
Fourth quarter

Statistics	CONN	WYO
First downs		
Plays–yards		
Rushes–yards		
Passing yards		
Passing: comp–att–int		
Turnovers		
Time of possession		

Team	Category	Player	Statistics
UConn	Passing		
UConn	Rushing		
UConn	Receiving		
Wyoming	Passing		
Wyoming	Rushing		
Wyoming	Receiving		

== Roster ==
2026 Wyoming Cowboys football team roster
Players
Coaches
Offense

Pos.	#	Name	Class
RB	1	Samuel Harris	So
WR	2	Eric Richardson	Sr
WR	3	Deion DeBlanc	So
WR	4	Ke'Lyn Washom	Fr
WR	5	Justin Popovich	Sr
QB	6	Tyler Hughes	Sr
QB	7	Mason Drube	Fr
RB	8	Markell Holman	Sr
WR	9	Jackson Holman	Jr
WR	11	Jayden Williams	Fr
WR	12	Bricen Brantley	Jr
WR	13	Pierre Jackson	Fr
QB	14	Landon Sims	Jr
QB	15	Taylor Hasselbeck	Fr
WR	16	Joaquin Sandoval	So
WR	19	Charlie Coenen	Sr
RB	20	Jaden Lawrence	Fr
RB	21	Nico Hamilton	So
RB	22	Diore Hubbard	So
WR	23	Tyler Nystrom	So
WR	24	Jarell Gary	Fr
RB	25	Dontae Burch	So
RB	28	Nikos Varelas	Jr
RB	29	Ryken Banks	Fr
QB	34	Tyler Franklin	Fr
TE	34	Tyler Hampton	Sr
OL	50	Giovanni Panozzo	So
OL	51	Jason Maciejczak	Jr
OL	52	Chandler Donaway	Sr
OL	54	Jonathan Pearcy	Fr
OL	55	Kalvin Janssen	Fr
OL	60	Grant Lott	Fr
OL	62	Spencer Rathbun	So
OL	63	Braylon Jenkins	So
OL	64	Brandt Rice	Jr
OL	65	Nathan Geiger	Jr
OL	66	Johnathan Bush	Fr
OL	68	Jackson Garrett	Fr
OL	70	Rex Johnsen	Sr
OL	71	Jake Davies	Jr
OL	72	Pierce Decker	Fr
OL	73	Caleb Hall	So
OL	74	Tariq Miller	Fr
OL	75	Cooper Lawson	Fr
OL	76	Quinn Grovesteen-Matchey	Jr
OL	77	Josiah Petaia	Jr
TE	80	Tyler Siddons	Sr
WR	81	Jordan Styles	Fr
TE	82	Gage Brook	Jr
TE	83	Kyle Frendt	So
TE	85	Ishmael Muhammad	Fr
TE	86	Colin Ford	Fr
TE	87	Isaac Schoenfield	Sr
TE	88	Landon Pace	Fr
TE	89	Jake Wilson	So

Defense

Pos.	#	Name	Class
CB, WR	0	Tyson Shamsid-Deen	So
S	1	Desman Hearns	Sr
S	2	Travis Franklin Jr.	Sr
CB	3	Ian Bell	Jr
S	4	Jeff Vincent	Jr
S	5	Brooklyn Cheek	So
S	6	Kaiden Kimble-Turner	Fr
CB	7	Junus McGraw	Jr
CB	8	Logan Mackey	Jr
CB	9	BJ Inmon	Jr
DE	11	Esaia Bogar	Sr
CB	12	Kendall Griffin	Fr
S	13	Elvin Ampofo	Fr
DB	15	David Leonard	So
LB	16	Karson Butts	So
S	18	Da'Marion Brownlee	Jr
S	19	Nathanial Watson	Jr
S	20	Lafai Purcell	Jr
DE	21	Jack Dunkley	Sr
S	22	Jaden DaCosta	Jr
S	23	Jones Thomas	Jr
DB	24	Drew Jackson	So
S	25	Therman Williams	Fr
LB	26	Gary Rutherford	So
LB	28	Boston Gable	Fr
LB	33	Parker Moore	Fr
LB	34	Steven Perez	Fr
DE	39	Eltoum Murgus	So
LB	40	Dante Bruley	Fr
LB	41	Mason Wright	Fr
LB	42	Ethan Stuhlsatz	GS
DT	44	Ja'Quan Redfern	Jr
LB	46	Dash Bauman	So
DE	47	Jason Handy	Fr
DT	50	Tanielu Maafala-Barbasa	Fr
DE	51	Thaddeus Gianaris	Sr
DL	53	Tegen Seeds	Sr
DT	54	MacGregor Byers	Fr
DE	55	Kevin Sjogren	Jr
DE	58	Jordan Turnbull	Jr
DT	68	Cody Crawford	Jr
DE	90	Cade Brook	Fr
DT	91	Xavier Jackson	Fr
DT	92	Dante Drake	Jr
DT	93	Mohanad Nahhas	Jr
DE	94	Beck Haswell	Fr
DT	95	Caleb Robinson	GS
DT	96	Henry Rehberg	Fr
DL	97	Alex Haswell	So
DT	98	Jayden Williams	Jr
DE	99	Donnie Wingate	Sr

Special teams

Pos.	#	Name	Class
P	18	Bart Edmiston	Sr
P	43	Gavyn Helm	So
LS	45	Charlie Houston	Fr
K	47	Erik Sandvik	Jr
LS	49	Nathan Curry	Sr
K	99	Keelan Anderson	So

Head coach

- Jay Sawvel (head coach)

Coordinators/assistant coaches

- Christian Taylor (offensive coordinator / quarterbacks)
- Aaron Bohl (defensive coordinator / linebackers)
- Shannon Moore (co-special teams coordinator / tight ends / fullbacks)
- Jason Petrino (co-special teams coordinator / safeties)
- Jovon Bouknight (wide receivers)
- Deonte Gibson (defensive tackles)
- JB Hall (cornerbacks)
- Gary Harrell (running backs)
- Brian Hendricks (defensive ends)
- Joe Tripodi (offensive line)
- Davis McCartney (offensive analyst)

Legend

- (C) Team captain
- (S) Suspended
- (I) Ineligible
- Injured
- Redshirt

Roster
Last update: August 13, 2026
