= 2026 North Dakota State Bison football team =

American college football season

2026 North Dakota State Bison football
- Conference: Mountain West
- Record: 9–2 (6–2 MW)
- Head coach: Tim Polasek (3rd season)
- Offensive coordinator: Dan Larson (2nd season)
- Offensive scheme: Multiple pro-style
- Defensive coordinator: Grant Olson (3rd season)
- Base defense: Multiple 4–3
- Home stadium: Fargodome

2026 Mountain West Conference football standings
	Conf.			Overall
Team	W		L	W		L
New Mexico	6	–	1	9	–	2
North Dakota State	6	–	2	9	–	2
Wyoming	6	–	2	7	–	4
Air Force	5	–	2	9	–	2
UNLV	5	–	2	7	–	4
Nevada	3	–	3	4	–	6
San Jose State	3	–	5	5	–	7
Hawaii	2	–	5	3	–	7
UTEP	0	–	7	1	–	10
Northern Illinois	0	–	7	0	–	11
Championship: December 4, 2026
As of November 22, 2026; Rankings from CFP rankings

The 2026 North Dakota State Bison football team represents North Dakota State University as a member of the Mountain West Conference during the 2026 NCAA Division I FBS football season. The Bison are led by third-year head coach Tim Polasek and play home games at the Fargodome in Fargo, North Dakota.

This is North Dakota State's first season in the NCAA Division I Football Bowl Subdivision (FBS) and as a member of the Mountain West Conference. The Bison were initially ineligible for postseason competition due to the National Collegiate Athletic Association (NCAA)-mandated two-year transition period for FCS-to-FBS reclassifications. However, on June 24, 2026, the NCAA Division I cabinet approved a recommendation from the FBS subcommittee to allow all future FCS-to-FBS transitioning programs immediate access to the postseason. The Bison will be eligible for a bowl game, should they win six games or be otherwise selected for one, the Mountain West championship game, and the College Football Playoff this season.

== Schedule ==
Date	Time	Opponent	Site	TV	Result	Attendance
August 29	4:30 p.m.	Jacksonville State*	Fargodome; Fargo, ND	CBSSN	W 33–7	18,537
September 5	2:30 p.m.	Fordham*	Fargodome; Fargo, ND	ABC ND/MW+	W 38–0	15,212
September 12	9:00 p.m.	at Air Force	Falcon Stadium; USAF Academy, CO	FS1	W 38–32	25,970
September 19	9:30 p.m.	at Sacramento State*	Hornet Stadium; Sacramento, CA	ESPN	W 31–10	13,322
October 3	2:30 p.m.	Wyoming^{†}	Fargodome; Fargo, ND (Battle of the Basins)	The CW	W 28–0	18,586
October 10	6:00 p.m.	at UNLV	Allegiant Stadium; Paradise, NV	The CW	L 7–13	33,516
October 17	6:00 p.m.	Nevada	Fargodome; Fargo, ND	CBSSN	W 31–17	18,261
October 24	9:00 p.m.	at New Mexico	University Stadium; Albuquerque, NM	The CW	L 16–21	34,794
October 31	2:30 p.m.	UTEP	Fargodome; Fargo, ND	ABC ND/MW+	W 31–7	15,513
November 14	10:00 p.m.	at Hawaii	Clarence T. C. Ching Athletics Complex; Honolulu, HI	The CW	W 21–13	15,014
November 21	3:00 p.m.	Northern Illinois	Fargodome; Fargo, ND	The CW	W 31–25	18,111
November 27	2:30 p.m.	at San Jose State (Note: North Dakota State and San Jose State will play as non-conference opponents in 2026)*	CEFCU Stadium; San Jose, CA	CBSSN		
*Non-conference game; ^{†}Homecoming; All times are in Central time; Source:

== Offseason ==
Positions key
Offense	Defense	Special teams
QB — Quarterback; RB — Running back; FB — Fullback; WR — Wide receiver; TE — Tight end; OL — Offensive lineman; T — Tackle; G — Guard; C — Center	DL — Defensive lineman; DT — Defensive tackle (Note: Includes nose tackle (NT)); DE — Defensive end; EDGE — Edge rusher; LB — Linebacker (Note: Includes middle linebacker (MLB/MIKE), weakside linebacker (WILL), strongside linebacker (SAM), off-ball linebacker, and outside linebacker (OLB)); DB — Defensive back; CB — Cornerback; S — Safety (Note: Includes free safety (FS) and strong safety (SS))	K — Kicker (Note: Also known as a placekicker (PK)); P — Punter; LS — Long snapper; RS — Return specialist (Note: Includes kickoff and punt returners)

=== Departures ===
==== Team departures ====
Over the course of the off-season, North Dakota State lost 22 total players. 11 players in the transfer portal, 8 players graduated, and 3 players declared for the 2026 NFL draft.

2026 North Dakota State offseason departures
Name	Pos.	Height	Weight	Year	Hometown	Notes
RaJa Nelson	WR	5'9"	196	Senior	Lakeville, MN	Graduated
Owen Johnson	RB	5'11"	212	Senior	Mankato, MN	Graduated
Bryce Lance	WR	6'3"	209	Senior	Marshall, MN	Graduated/Declared for 2026 NFL draft
Barika Kpeenu	RB	5'10"	213	Senior	West Fargo, ND	Graduated/Declared for 2026 NFL draft
Cole Payton	QB	6'3"	233	Senior	Omaha, NE	Graduated/Declared for 2026 NFL draft
Anthony Chideme-Alfaro	CB	6'2"	206	Senior	Sacramento, CA	Graduated/Declared for 2026 NFL draft
Ryan Jones	S	6'3"	204	Senior	Frisco, TX	Graduated
Truman Werremeyer	FB	6'2"	248	Senior	Fargo, ND	Graduated
Carson Williams	TE	6'4"	247	Senior	Marshalltown, IA	Graduated
Finn Diggins	TE	6'4"	246	Senior	Perham, MN	Graduated
Jack Iuliano	DE	6'3"	257	Senior	Rye, NY	Graduated

==== Outgoing transfers ====
11 North Dakota State players elected to enter the NCAA Transfer Portal during or after the 2025 season.

Name	No.	Pos.	Height	Weight	Hometown	Year	New school	Source
Jaquise Alexander	0	CB	5'10"	178	Ruskin, FL	Junior	Delaware	
Jailen Duffie	2	CB	5'11"	175	Waukegan, IL	Sophomore	UCF	
Chance Symons	11	DE	6'2"	236	Mitchell, NE	Junior	Incarnate Word	
Eli Ozick	38	K	5'11"	191	Liberty, MO	Sophomore	Iowa	
Sam Knoll	41	P	6'2"	200	Story City, IA	Freshman	Western Illinois	
Caleb Bowers	48	LS	6'1"	224	Whitefish Bay, WI	Junior	Florida State	
Nathaniel Staehling	52	LB	6'2"	238	Baxter, MN	Junior	Michigan	
Trent Fraley	63	C	6'1"	303	Moon Township, PA	Junior	Michigan State	
Beau Johnson	70	OT	6'6"	297	Spring Lake Park, MN	Sophomore	Vanderbilt	
Wyatt Osterbauer	90	DE	6'4"	234	Montrose, MN	Redshirt Freshman	Minnesota State (Div II)	
Toby Anene	93	DE	6'4"	259	Cottage Grove, MN	Junior	Colorado	

==== Coaching staff departures ====
Name	Position	New Team	New Position	Source
Will Johnson	Cornerbacks	UCF	Defensive backs	

=== Entered NFL draft ===
Four NDSU players declared for the draft in 2026.

Player	Position	Round	Pick	Drafted by
Bryce Lance	WR	4	136	New Orleans Saints
Cole Payton	QB	5	178	Philadelphia Eagles

=== Acquisitions ===
==== Incoming transfers ====
Over the offseason, North Dakota State added ten players from the transfer portal.

Name	Pos.	Height	Weight	Hometown	Year	Eligibility Remaining	Prev school	Source
Kene Anene	OL	6'5"	310	Cottage Grove, MN	Sophomore	3	Kansas	
Gage Gilbert	TE	6'6"	249	Camp Crook, SD	Junior	2	Dickinson State (NAIA)	
Anthony Okes	DE	6'3"	258	Great Falls, MT	Junior	2	Montana Tech (NAIA)	
Truman Griffith	DE	6'2"	255	Shawnee, KS	Sophomore	3	Kansas State	
EJ Davis	CB	6'1"	180	Orlando, FL	Sophomore	3	Wayne State (MI) (Div II)	
DJ Voltz	CB	6'1"	170	Saginaw, MI	Senior	1	Saginaw Valley State (Div II)	
Caleb McGrath	P	6'3"	200	Apple Valley, MN	Junior	2	Minnesota	
Chase Balser	LS	6'1"	205	Westville, OH	Senior	1	Olivet Nazarene (NAIA)	
Keith Williams Jr.	LB	6'1"	245	Milwaukee, WI	Junior	2	Cornell	
Jeremiah Patterson	WR	5'10"	169	San Francisco, CA	Senior	1	Arizona	
Jordan McCants	WR	5'11"	178	Birmingham, AL	Senior	1	West Virginia	
Chance Tucker	CB	6'0"	183	Encino, CA	Senior	2	Notre Dame	
Nyeoti Punni	RB	6'1"	220	Lebanon, NH	Senior	1	Holy Cross	
CJ Anderson	LS	6'1"	209	Elgin, SC	Senior	1	North Greenville (Div II)	
Tochi Okoro	WR	6'3"	205	Dodge City, KS	Junior	2	Garden City (KS) (NJCAA)	

==== 2026 recruiting class ====
The following recruits and transfers have signed letters of intent or verbally committed to the North Dakota State Bison football program for the 2026 recruiting year.

College recruiting
Name	Hometown	School	Height	Weight	Commit date
Q Barnslater; Cornerback	Burnsville, Minnesota	Apple Valley High School	5 ft 11 in (1.80 m)	165 lb (75 kg)	Dec 4, 2025
Q Barnslater; Cornerback	Recruit ratings: 247Sports:				
Earl Brown; Offensive line	Pillager, Minnesota	Pillager High School	6 ft 4 in (1.93 m)	290 lb (130 kg)	Dec 3, 2025
Earl Brown; Offensive line	Recruit ratings: 247Sports:				
Cash Danner; Tight end	Thompson, North Dakota	Thompson High School	6 ft 3 in (1.91 m)	220 lb (100 kg)	Dec 4, 2025
Cash Danner; Tight end	Recruit ratings: 247Sports:				
Daniel Devine; Defensive end	St. Paul, Minnesota	Academy of Holy Angels	6 ft 3 in (1.91 m)	225 lb (102 kg)	Dec 4, 2025
Daniel Devine; Defensive end	Recruit ratings: 247Sports:				
Brayden Dozier; Cornerback	Maple Grove, Minnesota	Maple Grove Senior High School	6 ft 0 in (1.83 m)	170 lb (77 kg)	Dec 4, 2025
Brayden Dozier; Cornerback	Recruit ratings: 247Sports:				
Myles Ellis; Wide receiver	Flossmoor, Illinois	Homewood-Flossmoor High School	5 ft 10 in (1.78 m)	160 lb (73 kg)	Dec 4, 2025
Myles Ellis; Wide receiver	Recruit ratings: 247Sports:				
Gatlin Empey; Fullback	Stoughton, Wisconsin	Stoughton High School	6 ft 1 in (1.85 m)	215 lb (98 kg)	
Gatlin Empey; Fullback	Recruit ratings: No ratings found				
Colten Gunderson; Tight end	Savage, Minnesota	Prior Lake High School	6 ft 6 in (1.98 m)	215 lb (98 kg)	Dec 1, 2025
Colten Gunderson; Tight end	Recruit ratings: 247Sports:				
Zach Hellendrung; Defensive tackle	Boyceville, Wisconsin	Boyceville High School	6 ft 2 in (1.88 m)	250 lb (110 kg)	Dec 4, 2025
Zach Hellendrung; Defensive tackle	Recruit ratings: 247Sports:				
Jason Hunter; Defensive tackle	Fargo, North Dakota	Fargo Davies High School	6 ft 4 in (1.93 m)	240 lb (110 kg)	Nov 20, 2025
Jason Hunter; Defensive tackle	Recruit ratings: 247Sports:				
Roman Johnson; Defensive end	Lakeville, Minnesota	Lakeville North High School	6 ft 1 in (1.85 m)	250 lb (110 kg)	
Roman Johnson; Defensive end	Recruit ratings: No ratings found				
Joaquin Jordan; Wide receiver	Flossmoor, Illinois	Homewood-Flossmoor High School	6 ft 3 in (1.91 m)	190 lb (86 kg)	
Joaquin Jordan; Wide receiver	Recruit ratings: No ratings found				
Trey McPartland; Offensive line	Valley City, North Dakota	Valley City High School	6 ft 4 in (1.93 m)	270 lb (120 kg)	Dec 4, 2025
Trey McPartland; Offensive line	Recruit ratings: 247Sports:				
Hank Nelson; Quarterback	Meridian, Idaho	Mountain View High School	6 ft 3 in (1.91 m)	195 lb (88 kg)	
Hank Nelson; Quarterback	Recruit ratings: No ratings found				
Jayden Onuonga; Kicker	Forest Lake, Minnesota	Forest Lake High School	6 ft 5 in (1.96 m)	200 lb (91 kg)	
Jayden Onuonga; Kicker	Recruit ratings: No ratings found				
Godson Rufus-Okomhanru; Running back	Mounds View, Minnesota	Mounds View High School	6 ft 0 in (1.83 m)	180 lb (82 kg)	Dec 4, 2025
Godson Rufus-Okomhanru; Running back	Recruit ratings: 247Sports:				
Deron Russell; Cornerback	Waseca, Minnesota	Waseca High School	6 ft 0 in (1.83 m)	175 lb (79 kg)	Dec 4, 2025
Deron Russell; Cornerback	Recruit ratings: 247Sports:				
Kobe Russell; Cornerback	Prescott, Wisconsin	Prescott High School	6 ft 1 in (1.85 m)	185 lb (84 kg)	Dec 4, 2025
Kobe Russell; Cornerback	Recruit ratings: 247Sports:				
Kye Schlichting; Wide receiver	Horace, North Dakota	West Fargo Sheyenne High School	6 ft 2 in (1.88 m)	190 lb (86 kg)	Dec 4, 2025
Kye Schlichting; Wide receiver	Recruit ratings: 247Sports:				
Luke Tetzlaff; Linebacker	Kaukauna, Wisconsin	Kaukauna High School	6 ft 1 in (1.85 m)	200 lb (91 kg)	
Luke Tetzlaff; Linebacker	Recruit ratings: No ratings found				
Gunner Thielges; Safety	LaMoure, North Dakota	LaMoure High School	6 ft 0 in (1.83 m)	185 lb (84 kg)	Dec 4, 2025
Gunner Thielges; Safety	Recruit ratings: 247Sports:				
Tucker Thieneman; Offensive line	Pewaukee, Wisconsin	Pewaukee High School	6 ft 4 in (1.93 m)	300 lb (140 kg)	Dec 4, 2025
Tucker Thieneman; Offensive line	Recruit ratings: 247Sports:				
Braylon Toliver; Running back	Erie, Colorado	Erie High School	5 ft 10 in (1.78 m)	195 lb (88 kg)	Dec 9, 2025
Braylon Toliver; Running back	Recruit ratings: 247Sports:				
Gabe Vernetti; Longsnapper	Machesney Park, Illinois	Boylan Catholic High School	5 ft 11 in (1.80 m)	195 lb (88 kg)	Oct 2, 2025
Gabe Vernetti; Longsnapper	Recruit ratings: No ratings found				
Simon Vinton; Defensive end	Orono, Minnesota	Orono High School	6 ft 5 in (1.96 m)	225 lb (102 kg)	
Simon Vinton; Defensive end	Recruit ratings: No ratings found				
Brandon Walton; Wide receiver	Kenosha, Wisconsin	Bradford High School	6 ft 2 in (1.88 m)	165 lb (75 kg)	Dec 18, 2025
Brandon Walton; Wide receiver	Recruit ratings: 247Sports:				
Caden Ward; Tight end	Lincoln, Nebraska	Lincoln Southeast High School	6 ft 2 in (1.88 m)	215 lb (98 kg)	Dec 3, 2025
Caden Ward; Tight end	Recruit ratings: 247Sports:				
Skyler Werner; Defensive tackle	Savage, Minnesota	Prior Lake High School	6 ft 1 in (1.85 m)	265 lb (120 kg)	Dec 3, 2025
Skyler Werner; Defensive tackle	Recruit ratings: 247Sports:				
Jack Wilson; Linebacker	Verona, Wisconsin	Mount Horeb High School	6 ft 1 in (1.85 m)	220 lb (100 kg)	Dec 4, 2025
Jack Wilson; Linebacker	Recruit ratings: 247Sports:				
Overall recruit ranking: 247Sports: 113
‡ Refers to 40-yard dash; Note: In many cases, Scout, Rivals, 247Sports, On3, and ESPN may conflict in their listings of height, weight and 40 time.; In these cases, the average was taken. ESPN grades are on a 100-point scale.; Sources: "2026 Team Ranking". Rivals.com.; "North Dakota State Football 2026 commits". 247Sports.

== Game summaries ==
All game summaries start times Central Time

=== Jacksonville State ===
Jacksonville State Gamecocks (0–0) vs. North Dakota State Bison (0–0)

Quarter	1	2	3	4	Total
Gamecocks	7	0	0	0	7
Bison	7	10	10	6	33

at Fargodome, Fargo, ND

- Date: August 29, 2026
- Game time: 4:30 p.m.
- Game weather: Indoors; 70 °F (21 °C)
- Game attendance: 18,537
- Referee: Patrick Foy
- TV announcers (CBSSN): Rich Waltz (play-by-play), Adam Breneman (analyst), Brian Kelly (analyst), Jordan Giorgio (sideline)
- Box Score

Statistics	Jacksonville State	North Dakota State
First downs	14	20
Plays–yards	54–170	67–373
Rushes–yards	31–85	44–209
Passing yards	85	164
Passing: comp–att–int	12–23–1	15–23–1
Turnovers	2	1
Time of possession	23:53	36:07

Team	Category	Player	Statistics
Jacksonville State	Passing	Caden Creel	12/23, 85 yds, INT
Jacksonville State	Rushing	Jalen Likely	11 car, 48 yds
Jacksonville State	Receiving	Deondre Johnson	2 rec, 26 yds
North Dakota State	Passing	Nathan Hayes	14/22, 160 yds, 2 TD, INT
North Dakota State	Rushing	Myles Mitchell	11 car, 74 yds
North Dakota State	Receiving	Jackson Williams	5 rec, 58 yds

Scoring summary

Quarter	Time	Drive			Team	Scoring information	Score	
Quarter	Time	Plays	Yards	TOP	Team	Scoring information	JSU	NDSU
1st	10:09	8	75	4:51	NDSU	Reis Kessel (#81) 6-yard touchdown reception from Nathan Hayes (#2), Drew Klein (#37) kick good	0	7
1st	4:16	6	64	2:35	JSU	Caden Creel (#12) 8-yard touchdown run, Garrison Rippa (#37) kick good	7	7
2nd	10:46	14	49	8:23	NDSU	34-yard field goal by Drew Klein (#37)	7	10
2nd	0:18	8	88	1:24	NDSU	Jordan McCants (#11) 44-yard touchdown reception from Nathan Hayes (#2), Drew Klein (#37) kick good	7	17
3rd	6:59	7	30	4:15	NDSU	44-yard field goal by Drew Klein (#37)	7	20
3rd	6:41				NDSU	Fumble recovery returned 0 yards for touchdown by Blake Schiltz (#48), Drew Klein (#37) kick good	7	27
4th	13:31	12	75	5:15	NDSU	42-yard field goal by Drew Klein (#37)	7	30
4th	2:17	11	37	7:10	NDSU	48-yard field goal by Drew Klein (#37)	7	33
"TOP" = time of possession. For other American football terms, see Glossary of American football.							7	33

=== Fordham (FCS) ===
Fordham Rams (FCS) (0–1) vs. North Dakota State Bison (1–0)

Quarter	1	2	3	4	Total
Rams (FCS)	0	0	0	0	0
Bison	3	14	21	0	38

at Fargodome, Fargo, ND

- Date: September 5, 2026
- Game time: 2:30 p.m.
- Game weather: Indoors; 70 °F (21 °C)
- Game attendance: 15,212
- Referee: Cal McNeill
- TV: MW+
- Box Score

Statistics	Fordham	North Dakota State
First downs	9	22
Plays–yards	48–135	69–373
Rushes–yards	26–19	43–128
Passing yards	116	245
Passing: comp–att–int	12–22–3	21–26–0
Turnovers	3	0
Time of possession	26:33	33:27

Team	Category	Player	Statistics
Fordham	Passing	Gunnar Smith	12/22, 116 yds, 3 INT
Fordham	Rushing	Yohan-Li Louis	9 car, 23 yds
Fordham	Receiving	John Morris	3 rec, 37 yds
North Dakota State	Passing	Nathan Hayes	18/22, 210 yds, 2 TD
North Dakota State	Rushing	DJ Scott	11 car, 60 yds, 2 TD
North Dakota State	Receiving	Chris Kiel	4 rec, 50 yds, TD

Scoring summary

Quarter	Time	Drive			Team	Scoring information	Score	
Quarter	Time	Plays	Yards	TOP	Team	Scoring information	FOR	NDSU
1st	7:01	16	58	7:43	NDSU	39-yard field goal by Drew Klein (#37)	0	3
2nd	14:56	7	65	3:25	NDSU	DJ Scott (#7) 3-yard touchdown run, Drew Klein (#37) kick good	0	10
2nd	0:55	9	80	1:24	NDSU	Chris Kiel (#8) 8-yard touchdown reception from Nathan Hayes (#2), Drew Klein (#37) kick good	0	17
3rd	13:56				NDSU	Interception returned 37 yards for touchdown by Marion Moore (#16), Drew Klein (#37) kick good	0	24
3rd	10:51	2	15	0:55	NDSU	DJ Scott (#7) 7-yard touchdown run, Drew Klein (#37) kick good	0	31
3rd	4:28	9	59	4:37	NDSU	Mekhi Collins (#15) 12-yard touchdown reception from Nathan Hayes (#2), Drew Klein (#37) kick good	0	38
"TOP" = time of possession. For other American football terms, see Glossary of American football.							0	38

=== Air Force ===
North Dakota State Bison (2–0) vs. Air Force Falcons (1–0)

Quarter	1	2	3	4	Total
Bison	7	21	7	3	38
Falcons	0	13	0	19	32

at Falcon Stadium, USAF Academy, CO

- Date: September 12, 2026
- Game time: 9:00 p.m.
- Game weather: Cloudy; 71 °F (22 °C); Wind: S 10 mph
- Game attendance: 25,970
- Referee: Patrick Foy
- TV announcers (FS1): Carlo Jiménez (play-by-play), Petros Papadakis (analyst)
- Box Score

Statistics	North Dakota State	Air Force
First downs	18	21
Plays–yards	60–374	66–386
Rushes–yards	37–146	51–207
Passing yards	228	179
Passing: comp–att–int	15–23–1	9–15–1
Turnovers	1	1
Time of possession	29:05	30:55

Team	Category	Player	Statistics
North Dakota State	Passing	Nathan Hayes	15/23, 228 yds, 2 TD, INT
North Dakota State	Rushing	Myles Mitchell	15 car, 61 yds, 2 TD
North Dakota State	Receiving	Logan Conklin	2 rec, 57 yds, TD
Air Force	Passing	Liam Szarka	5/10, 103 yds, INT
Air Force	Rushing	Liam Szarka	21 car, 88 yds, TD
Air Force	Receiving	Matt Long	2 rec, 55 yds, TD

Scoring summary

Quarter	Time	Drive			Team	Scoring information	Score	
Quarter	Time	Plays	Yards	TOP	Team	Scoring information	NDSU	AF
1st	9:54	9	75	5:06	NDSU	Myles Mitchell (#5) 31-yard touchdown run, Drew Klein (#37) kick good	7	0
2nd	14:08	16	80	8:44	NDSU	Nathan Hayes (#2) 17-yard touchdown run, Drew Klein (#37) kick good	14	0
2nd	8:14	5	72	2:34	AF	Adam Hrynciw (#10) 29-yard touchdown reception from Mason Hayes (#18), Carter Cremascoli (#90) kick good	14	7
2nd	5:20	5	75	2:54	NDSU	Mekhi Collins (#15) 44-yard touchdown reception from Nathan Hayes (#2), Drew Klein (#37) kick good	21	7
2nd	1:48				AF	Interception returned 85 yards for touchdown by Blake Fletcher (#6), Carter Cremascoli (#90) kick no good	21	13
2nd	0:29	6	65	1:19	NDSU	Myles Mitchell (#5) 1-yard touchdown run, Drew Klein (#37) kick good	28	13
3rd	12:02	2	39	0:44	NDSU	Logan Conklin (#84) 41-yard touchdown reception from Nathan Hayes (#2), Drew Klein (#37) kick good	35	13
4th	10:59	14	73	7:19	AF	Liam Szarka (#9) 2-yard touchdown run, 2-point pass incomplete	35	19
4th	4:26	13	80	4:20	AF	Kemper Hodges (#4) 2-yard touchdown run, 2-point pass incomplete	35	25
4th	1:58	7	13	2:26	NDSU	56-yard field goal by Drew Klein (#37)	38	25
4th	0:50	8	75	1:08	AF	Matt Long (#3) 20-yard touchdown reception from Evan Medders (#5), Carter Cremascoli (#90) kick good	38	32
"TOP" = time of possession. For other American football terms, see Glossary of American football.							38	32

=== Sacramento State ===
North Dakota State Bison (3–0) vs. Sacramento State Hornets (1–2)

Quarter	1	2	3	4	Total
Bison	21	7	0	3	31
Hornets	0	3	0	7	10

at Hornet Stadium, Sacramento, CA

- Date: September 19, 2026
- Game time: 9:30 p.m.
- Game weather: Sunny; 81 °F (27 °C); Wind: SW 3 mph
- Game attendance: 13,322
- Referee: Rich Edwards
- TV announcers (ESPN): Lowell Galindo (play-by-play), Kirk Morrison (analyst), Dawn Davenport (sideline)
- Box Score

Statistics	North Dakota State	Sacramento State
First downs	17	20
Plays–yards	59–362	67–328
Rushes–yards	34–152	26–90
Passing yards	210	238
Passing: comp–att–int	14–25–0	25–41–2
Turnovers	0	3
Time of possession	30:30	29:30

Team	Category	Player	Statistics
North Dakota State	Passing	Nathan Hayes	14/24, 210 yds, TD
North Dakota State	Rushing	DJ Scott	14 car, 80 yds, TD
North Dakota State	Receiving	Jackson Williams	7 rec, 134 yds, TD
Sacramento State	Passing	Jackson Sharman	25/41, 238 yds, TD, 2 INT
Sacramento State	Rushing	Cincere Rhaney	9 car, 38 yds
Sacramento State	Receiving	Matthew Coleman	8 rec, 95 yds

Scoring summary

Quarter	Time	Drive			Team	Scoring information	Score	
Quarter	Time	Plays	Yards	TOP	Team	Scoring information	NDSU	SAC
1st	13:37	5	75	1:23	NDSU	Jackson Williams (#18) 33-yard touchdown reception from Nathan Hayes (#2), Drew Klein (#37) kick good	7	0
1st	11:49				NDSU	Fumble recovery returned 24 yards for touchdown by Darius Givance (#29), Drew Klein (#37) kick good	14	0
1st	0:04	4	49	1:50	NDSU	Myles Mitchell (#5) 9-yard touchdown run, Drew Klein (#37) kick good	21	0
2nd	11:24	5	62	2:44	NDSU	DJ Scott (#7) 42-yard touchdown run, Drew Klein (#37) kick good	28	0
2nd	6:52	9	63	4:32	SAC	25-yard field goal by Grant Meadors (#49)	28	3
4th	12:00	12	53	7:03	NDSU	29-yard field goal by Drew Klein (#37)	31	3
4th	8:05	7	80	3:55	SAC	Onterrio Smith Jr (#12) 21-yard touchdown reception from Jackson Sharman (#8), Grant Meadors (#49) kick good	31	10
"TOP" = time of possession. For other American football terms, see Glossary of American football.							31	10

=== Wyoming ===
Wyoming Cowboys (2–2) vs. North Dakota State Bison (4–0)

Quarter	1	2	3	4	Total
Cowboys	0	0	0	0	0
Bison	7	10	3	8	28

at Fargodome, Fargo, ND

- Date: October 3, 2026
- Game time: 2:30 p.m.
- Game weather: Indoors; 70 °F (21 °C)
- Game attendance: 18,586
- Referee: Kenneth Ray
- TV announcers (The CW): Jack McMullen (play-by-play), Cody Kessler (analyst), Marshall Newhouse (sideline)
- Box Score

Statistics	Wyoming	North Dakota State
First downs	8	23
Plays–yards	49–162	70–407
Rushes–yards	35–110	45–220
Passing yards	52	187
Passing: comp–att–int	5–14–1	14–25–0
Turnovers	1	0
Time of possession	26:54	33:06

Team	Category	Player	Statistics
Wyoming	Passing	Tyler Hughes	5/14, 52 yds, INT
Wyoming	Rushing	Tyler Hughes	12 car, 37 yds
Wyoming	Receiving	Charlie Coenen	1 rec, 16 yds
North Dakota State	Passing	Nathan Hayes	14/25, 187 yds
North Dakota State	Rushing	Nathan Hayes	10 car, 79 yds, 2 TD
North Dakota State	Receiving	Jackson Williams	4 rec, 75 yds

Scoring summary

Quarter	Time	Drive			Team	Scoring information	Score	
Quarter	Time	Plays	Yards	TOP	Team	Scoring information	WYO	NDSU
1st	12:43	5	19	2:09	NDSU	Nathan Hayes (#2) 8-yard touchdown run, Drew Klein (#37) kick good	0	7
2nd	10:39	7	97	3:28	NDSU	Nathan Hayes (#2) 14-yard touchdown run, Drew Klein (#37) kick good	0	14
2nd	0:20	12	68	3:03	NDSU	31-yard field goal by Drew Klein (#37)	0	17
3rd	8:20	15	74	6:35	NDSU	37-yard field goal by Drew Klein (#37)	0	20
4th	8:50	8	66	4:20	NDSU	DJ Scott (#7) 1-yard touchdown run, 2-point run by Jackson Williams (#18) good	0	28
"TOP" = time of possession. For other American football terms, see Glossary of American football.							0	28

=== UNLV ===
North Dakota State Bison (5–0) vs. UNLV Rebels (3–2)

Quarter	1	2	3	4	Total
Bison	0	7	0	0	7
Rebels	7	0	3	3	13

at Allegiant Stadium, Las Vegas, NV

- Date: October 10, 2026
- Game time: 6:00 p.m.
- Game weather: Indoors; 72 °F (22 °C)
- Game attendance: 33,516
- Referee: Patrick Foy
- TV announcers (The CW): Jack McMullen (play-by-play), Cody Kessler (analyst), Marshall Newhouse (sideline)
- Box Score

Statistics	North Dakota State	UNLV
First downs	19	16
Plays–yards	61–300	64–255
Rushes–yards	39–176	48–178
Passing yards	124	77
Passing: comp–att–int	12–22–3	8–16–1
Turnovers	3	1
Time of possession	26:32	33:28

Team	Category	Player	Statistics
North Dakota State	Passing	Nathan Hayes	12/22, 124 yds, TD, 3 INT
North Dakota State	Rushing	Myles Mitchell	22 car, 91 yds
North Dakota State	Receiving	Chris Kiel	2 rec, 30 yds, TD
UNLV	Passing	Jackson Arnold	8/16, 77 yds, INT
UNLV	Rushing	Jai'Den Thomas	22 car, 112 yds
UNLV	Receiving	Kayden McGee	3 rec, 43 yds

Scoring summary

Quarter	Time	Drive			Team	Scoring information	Score	
Quarter	Time	Plays	Yards	TOP	Team	Scoring information	NDSU	UNLV
1st	9:39				UNLV	Interception returned 23 yards for touchdown by Andre Porter (#42), Ramon Villela (#32) kick good	0	7
2nd	6:10	4	34	1:28	NDSU	Chris Kiel (#8) 21-yard touchdown reception from Nathan Hayes (#2), Drew Klein (#37) kick good	7	7
3rd	8:12	7	42	2:59	UNLV	29-yard field goal by Villela Ramon (#32)	7	10
4th	10:57	6	11	3:13	UNLV	24-yard field goal by Ramon Villela (#32)	7	13
"TOP" = time of possession. For other American football terms, see Glossary of American football.							7	13

=== Nevada ===
Nevada Wolf Pack (2–3) vs. North Dakota State Bison (5–1)

Quarter	1	2	3	4	Total
Wolf Pack	0	11	6	0	17
Bison	0	19	5	7	31

at Fargodome, Fargo, ND

- Date: October 17, 2026
- Game time: 6:00 p.m.
- Game weather: Indoors; 70 °F (21 °C)
- Game attendance: 18,261
- Referee: Christian Watson
- TV announcers (CBSSN): Chris Lewis (play-by-play), Doug Pederson (analyst)
- Box Score

Statistics	Nevada	North Dakota State
First downs	15	19
Plays–yards	57–286	70–345
Rushes–yards	21–96	45–192
Passing yards	190	153
Passing: comp–att–int	17–36–2	19–25–0
Turnovers	2	0
Time of possession	21:51	38:09

Team	Category	Player	Statistics
Nevada	Passing	AJ Bianco	17/34, 190 yds, TD, 2 INT
Nevada	Rushing	Dominic Kelley	11 car, 60 yds
Nevada	Receiving	Gary Givens III	3 rec, 50 yds, TD
North Dakota State	Passing	Nathan Hayes	19/25, 153 yds, 2 TD
North Dakota State	Rushing	Myles Mitchell	13 car, 49 yds
North Dakota State	Receiving	Jackson Williams	5 rec, 58 yds

Scoring summary

Quarter	Time	Drive			Team	Scoring information	Score	
Quarter	Time	Plays	Yards	TOP	Team	Scoring information	NEV	NDSU
2nd	14:15	11	65	4:52	NEV	AJ Bianco (#10) 15-yard touchdown run, 2-point rush good	8	0
2nd	10:00	4	3	1:25	NEV	39-yard field goal by Joe McFadden (#84)	11	0
2nd	6:04	8	71	3:49	NDSU	Nathan Hayes (#2) 5-yard touchdown run, 2-point pass incomplete	11	6
2nd	0:21	14	77	4:07	NDSU	Mekhi Collins (#15) 21-yard touchdown reception from Nathan Hayes (#2), Drew Klein (#37) kick no good blocked	11	12
2nd	0:00				NDSU	Jackson Williams (#18) 100-yard missed field goal return, Drew Klein (#38) kick good	11	19
3rd	11:25	6	51	1:49	NEV	Gary Givens III (#7) 19-yard touchdown reception from AJ Bianco (#10), 2-point rush no good	17	19
3rd	11:25				NDSU	Matthew Stenbroten (#11) 74-yard fumble recovery 2-point conversion return	17	21
3rd	5:12	7	15	3:30	NDSU	39-yard field goal by Drew Klein (#38)	17	24
4th	14:08	6	63	3:49	NDSU	Reis Kessel (#81) 12-yard touchdown reception from Nathan Hayes (#2), Drew Klein (#38) kick good	17	31
"TOP" = time of possession. For other American football terms, see Glossary of American football.							17	31

=== New Mexico ===
North Dakota State Bison (6–1) vs. New Mexico Lobos (5–1)

Quarter	1	2	3	4	Total
Bison	3	0	6	7	16
Lobos	7	7	0	7	21

at University Stadium, Albuquerque, NM

- Date: October 24, 2026
- Game time: 9:00 p.m.
- Game weather: Cloudy; 60 °F (16 °C); Wind: SE 10 mph
- Game attendance: 34,794
- Referee: Cal McNeill
- TV announcers (The CW): Jack McMullen (play-by-play), Cody Kessler (analyst), Marshall Newhouse (sideline)
- Box Score

Statistics	North Dakota State	New Mexico
First downs	13	15
Plays–yards	63–251	58–279
Rushes–yards	28–53	44–187
Passing yards	196	92
Passing: comp–att–int	17–35–2	8–14–1
Turnovers	2	1
Time of possession	29:28	30:32

Team	Category	Player	Statistics
North Dakota State	Passing	Nathan Hayes	17/33, 198 yds, 2 TD, 2 INT
North Dakota State	Rushing	Myles Mitchell	10 car, 34 yds
North Dakota State	Receiving	Jackson Williams	4 rec, 71 yds
New Mexico	Passing	Toa Fa'avae	8/14, 92 yds, INT
New Mexico	Rushing	Kiefer Sibley	13 car, 91 yds, TD
New Mexico	Receiving	Cade Keith	5 rec, 53 yds

Scoring summary

Quarter	Time	Drive			Team	Scoring information	Score	
Quarter	Time	Plays	Yards	TOP	Team	Scoring information	NDSU	UNM
1st	11:51	6	75	3:09	UNM	Kiefer Sibley (#21) 29-yard touchdown run, Grant Glasgow (#31) kick good	0	7
1st	5:17	9	61	3:30	NDSU	27-yard field goal by Drew Klein (#37)	3	7
2nd	0:10	7	46	1:33	UNM	Scottre Humphrey (#22) 2-yard touchdown run, Grant Glasgow (#31) kick good	3	14
3rd	6:12	8	63	4:06	NDSU	Reis Kessel (#81) 15-yard touchdown reception from Nathan Hayes (#2), Drew Klein (#37) kick blocked	9	14
4th	10:57				UNM	Interception returned 56 yards for touchdown by Austin Brawley (#0), Nicholas Romero (#41) kick good	9	21
4th	6:42	10	75	4:15	NDSU	Mekhi Collins (#15) 4-yard touchdown reception from Nathan Hayes (#2), Drew Klein (#37) kick good	16	21
"TOP" = time of possession. For other American football terms, see Glossary of American football.							16	21

=== UTEP ===
UTEP Miners (1–6) vs. North Dakota State Bison (6–2)

Quarter	1	2	3	4	Total
Miners	7	0	0	0	7
Bison	0	10	7	14	31

at Fargodome, Fargo, ND

- Date: October 31, 2026
- Game time: 2:30 p.m.
- Game weather: Indoors; 70 °F (21 °C)
- Game attendance: 15,513
- Referee: Brad Carrell
- TV: MW+
- Box Score

Statistics	UTEP	North Dakota State
First downs	9	19
Plays–yards	51–238	69–381
Rushes–yards	29–147	37–141
Passing yards	91	240
Passing: comp–att–int	15–22–2	22–32–1
Turnovers	2	1
Time of possession	23:16	36:44

Team	Category	Player	Statistics
UTEP	Passing	EJ Colson Jr.	11/16, 59 yds, 2 INT
UTEP	Rushing	Raymond Moore III	3 car, 67 yds, TD
UTEP	Receiving	Jaden Smith	6 rec, 41 yds
North Dakota State	Passing	Nathan Hayes	22/32, 240 yds, TD, INT
North Dakota State	Rushing	DJ Scott	13 car, 50 yds, TD
North Dakota State	Receiving	Jackson Williams	10 rec, 111 yds

Scoring summary

Quarter	Time	Drive			Team	Scoring information	Score	
Quarter	Time	Plays	Yards	TOP	Team	Scoring information	UTEP	NDSU
1st	12:38	1	57	0:10	UTEP	Raymond Moore III (#12) 57-yard touchdown run, Carlos Arreola (#91) kick good	7	0
2nd	12:03	16	83	8:10	NDSU	30-yard field goal by Drew Klein (#37)	7	3
2nd	3:47	5	45	2:32	NDSU	DJ Scott (#7) 1-yard touchdown run, Drew Klein (#37) kick good	7	10
3rd	1:16	10	80	5:42	NDSU	Reis Kessel (#81) 3-yard touchdown reception from Nathan Hayes (#2), Drew Klein (#37) kick good	7	17
4th	1:45	6	62	3:36	NDSU	Nathan Hayes (#2) 1-yard touchdown run, Drew Klein (#37) kick good	7	24
4th	1:06				NDSU	Fumble recovery returned 46 yards for touchdown by Marion Moore (#16), Drew Klein (#37) kick good	7	31
"TOP" = time of possession. For other American football terms, see Glossary of American football.							7	31

=== Hawaii ===
North Dakota State Bison (7–2) vs. Hawaii Rainbow Warriors (3–6)

Quarter	1	2	3	4	Total
Bison	7	0	0	14	21
Rainbow Warriors	0	7	6	0	13

at Clarence T. C. Ching Athletics Complex, Honolulu, HI

- Date: November 14, 2026
- Game time: 10:00 p.m.
- Game weather: Cloudy; 75 °F (24 °C); Wind: E 14 mph
- Game attendance: 15,014
- Referee: Christian Watson
- TV announcers (The CW): Chris Fisher (play-by-play), Isaiah Stanback (analyst), Bryan Walters (sideline)
- Box Score

Statistics	North Dakota State	Hawaii
First downs	12	17
Plays–yards	56–183	73–262
Rushes–yards	36–86	26–31
Passing yards	97	231
Passing: comp–att–int	13–20–0	31–47–2
Turnovers	0	2
Time of possession	30:47	29:13

Team	Category	Player	Statistics
North Dakota State	Passing	Nathan Hayes	13/20, 97 yds, TD
North Dakota State	Rushing	DJ Scott	13 car, 35 yds, TD
North Dakota State	Receiving	Mekhi Collins	4 rec, 34 yds, TD
Hawaii	Passing	Micah Alejado	31/47, 231 yds, 2 INT
Hawaii	Rushing	Cam Barfield	8 car, 26 yds
Hawaii	Receiving	Kainoa Carvalho	7 rec, 63 yds

Scoring summary

Quarter	Time	Drive			Team	Scoring information	Score	
Quarter	Time	Plays	Yards	TOP	Team	Scoring information	NDSU	HAW
1st	4:20	2	11	0:41	NDSU	Mekhi Collins (#15) 7-yard touchdown reception from Nathan Hayes (#2), Drew Klein (#37) kick good	7	0
2nd	0:04	7	59	2:05	HAW	DeVon Rice (#1) 15-yard touchdown run, Sean Olvera-Harle (#98) kick good	7	7
3rd	7:54	8	41	3:07	HAW	28-yard field goal by Sean Olvera-Harle (#98)	7	10
3rd	2:16	10	25	3:42	HAW	33-yard field goal by Sean Olvera-Harle (#98)	7	13
4th	8:34	16	77	8:37	NDSU	DJ Scott (#7) 1-yard touchdown run, Drew Klein (#37) kick good	14	13
4th	6:27				NDSU	Interception returned 49 yards for touchdown by Ray James Jr. (#25), Drew Klein (#37) kick good	21	13
"TOP" = time of possession. For other American football terms, see Glossary of American football.							21	13

=== Northern Illinois ===
Northern Illinois Huskies (0–10) vs. North Dakota State Bison (8–2)

Quarter	1	2	Total
Huskies			0
Bison			0

at Fargodome, Fargo, ND

- Date: November 21, 2026
- Game time: 3:00 p.m.
- Game weather: Indoors; 70 °F (21 °C)
- Game attendance: 18,111
- Referee: Marcus Thornton
- TV announcers (The CW): Jack McMullen (play-by-play), Cody Kessler (analyst), Marshall Newhouse (sideline)
- Box Score

Statistics	Northern Illinois	North Dakota State
First downs	21	21
Plays–yards	65–433	59–414
Rushes–yards	36–173	33–134
Passing yards	260	280
Passing: comp–att–int	20–29–2	18–26–1
Turnovers	2	2
Time of possession	32:51	27:09

Team	Category	Player	Statistics
Northern Illinois	Passing	Taron Dickens	20/29, 260 yds, 3 TD, 2 INT
Northern Illinois	Rushing	Elijah Porter	17 car, 107 yds
Northern Illinois	Receiving	Dearee Rogers	6 rec, 116 yds, TD
North Dakota State	Passing	Nathan Hayes	15/23, 247 yds, 4 TD, INT
North Dakota State	Rushing	DJ Scott	11 car, 86 yds
North Dakota State	Receiving	Jackson Williams	6 rec, 104 yds, TD

Scoring summary

Quarter	Time	Drive			Team	Scoring information	Score	
Quarter	Time	Plays	Yards	TOP	Team	Scoring information	NIU	NDSU
1st	10:23	4	83	1:25	NDSU	Jackson Williams (#18) 47-yard touchdown reception from Nathan Hayes (#2), Drew Klein (#37) kick good	0	7
2nd	10:22	8	54	4:23	NIU	36-yard field goal by JJ Schlenhardt (#33)	3	7
2nd	6:54	7	75	3:28	NDSU	Mekhi Collins (#15) 35-yard touchdown reception from Nathan Hayes (#2), Drew Klein (#37) kick good	3	14
2nd	2:38	7	60	2:51	NDSU	Jett Zabel (#85) 22-yard touchdown reception from Nathan Hayes (#2), Drew Klein (#37) kick good	3	21
2nd	0:00	3	28	0:19	NDSU	51-yard field goal by Drew Klein (#37)	3	24
3rd	11:04	8	75	3:56	NDSU	Jordan McCants (#11) 10-yard touchdown reception from Nathan Hayes (#2), Drew Klein (#37) kick good	3	31
3rd	0:55	9	65	4:41	NIU	La'Don Bryant (#0) 7-yard touchdown reception from Taron Dickens (#5), 2-point pass complete	11	31
4th	7:35	9	86	5:04	NIU	Afy Ibekwe (#6) 17-yard touchdown reception from Taron Dickens (#5), JJ Schlenhardt (#33) kick good	18	31
4th	2:46	5	96	1:40	NIU	DeAree Rogers (#1) 47-yard touchdown reception from Taron Dickens (#5), JJ Schlenhardt (#33) kick good	25	31
"TOP" = time of possession. For other American football terms, see Glossary of American football.							25	31

=== San Jose State ===
North Dakota State Bison (9–2) vs. San Jose State Spartans (5–7)

Quarter	1	2	Total
Bison			0
Spartans			0

at CEFCU Stadium, San Jose, CA

- Date: November 27, 2026
- Game time: 2:30 p.m.
- Game weather: TBD
- TV: CBSSN

== Roster ==
2026 North Dakota State Bison football team roster
Players
Coaches
Offense

Pos.	#	Name	Class
QB	0	Preston Brown	So
QB	2	Nathan Hayes (C)	Sr
WR	3	Jeremiah Patterson	Sr
RB	4	Nyeoti Punni	Sr
RB	5	Myles Mitchell	Fr
RB	7	DJ Scott	Jr
RB	8	Braylon Toliver	Fr
WR	8	Chris Kiel	Fr
TE	9	Gabriel Cunningham	Fr
QB	10	Trey Drake	Jr
WR	11	Jordan McCants	Sr
WR	12	Myles Ellis	Fr
QB	13	Zander Smith	Fr
WR	15	Mekhi Collins (C)	Sr
QB	16	Henry Nelson	Fr
WR	17	Isiah St. Romain	So
WR	18	Jackson Williams	Jr
WR	19	John Gores	Sr
WR	20	Drake Schlosser	Fr
RB	22	Charles Ross III	Fr
WR	23	Kye Schlichting	Fr
RB	25	Godson Rufus-Okomhanru	Fr
RB	26	Brady Wavrunek	Jr
WR	27	Joaquin Jordan	Fr
RB	28	Cortez LeGrant	Jr
WR	30	Kelly Watson	Jr
RB	32	Barry Kpeenu	So
RB	34	Jonathan Harvey	Sr
TE	40	Kaden Zenzen	Sr
TE	43	Cash Danner	Fr
TE	44	Luke Kokat	Sr
FB	45	Gatlin Empey	Fr
TE	46	Caden Ward	Fr
TE	49	Colten Gunderson	Fr
OL	55	Kene Anene	So
OT	57	Gavin Wang	Fr
G	59	James Nellis	Fr
C	61	Gage Schmidt	So
G	62	Griffin Empey (C)	Jr
OL	63	Trey McPartland	Fr
G	66	Jack Liwienski	Jr
OL	67	Earl Brown	Fr
G	68	Coy Okeson	So
OL	70	Tucker Thieneman	Fr
G	71	Nate Tastad	So
G	72	Nate Schneckloth	Jr
OT	73	Alex Warden	Fr
G	74	Brett Tastad	Fr
OT	75	Josh Magin	Sr
OT	76	Ryan Babatz	So
OT	77	Austin Schultz	Jr
OT	78	Noah Stommes	So
WR	80	Jacob Kilzer	So
TE	81	Reis Kessel	So
WR	82	SJ Green	Fr
WR	83	Cade Osterman	Jr
WR	84	Logan Conklin	So
TE	85	Jett Zabel	So
WR	86	Dylan Vokal	Fr
TE	87	Noah Nelson (injured)	Fr
WR	87	Brandon Walton	Fr
TE	88	Isaac Ellison	Fr
WR	89	Tochi Okoro	Jr
TE	96	Abraham Myers	Jr

Defense

Pos.	#	Name	Class
DE	0	Victor Isele	Jr
LB	1	Donovan Woolen	Jr
CB	2	EJ Davis	So
LB	3	Gavin Sell	Fr
CB	4	Najee Nelson	Jr
S	6	Jaylin Crumby	Jr
CB	7	Chance Tucker	Sr
DT	8	Keenan Wilson (C)	Jr
DE	9	Kelton McCaslin	Sr
DE	11	Matthew Stenbroten	So
CB	12	DJ Voltz (injured)	Sr
S	13	Mikhale Ford	Fr
S	14	Taylen Eady	So
CB	16	Marion Moore	Fr
CB	19	Will Rosenmeyer	So
S	20	Will Steil	So
LB	21	Noah Taylor	Jr
S	22	Hudson Artz	Sr
CB	23	Kegan Huber	Sr
CB	24	Kobe Russell	Fr
LB	25	Ray James Jr.	So
S	26	Evrett Tait	Fr
CB	27	Landon Meier	So
CB	28	Kendrick Carter	Fr
S	29	Darius Givance (injured) (C)	Sr
S	30	Jaylen Archibald	Fr
CB	31	Q Barnslater	Fr
CB	32	Brayden Dozier	Fr
S	33	Walker Braaten	Fr
CB	34	Deron Russell	Fr
LB	35	Ryland Satter	So
S	36	Gunner Thielges	Fr
LB	38	Ben Schepp	Fr
LB	41	Peder Haugo	So
LB	42	Alex Elliott	Jr
LB	44	Carter Appl	Fr
LB	45	Luke Tetzlaff	Fr
LB	46	Jack Wilson	Fr
LB	47	Jacob Wrbanek	Fr
DE	48	Blake Schiltz	Fr
LB	50	Damian Devine	Fr
LB	52	Keith Williams	Jr
DT	53	Chase Evink	Fr
DT	54	Alijah Wayne (injured)	So
LB	55	Oliver Lucht	Jr
DE	56	Allante Burley	Sr
DT	58	Zach Hellendrung	Fr
DE	60	Thomas Roberts	Fr
DT	64	Jason Hunter	Fr
DT	65	Brody Clubb	Fr
DT	69	Skyler Werner	Fr
DE	90	Truman Griffith	So
DE	91	Ethan Wood	Fr
DE	92	Daniel Devine	Fr
DE	93	Anthony Okes	Jr
DT	94	Logan Larson (C)	Sr
DT	95	Zach Vanderpool	So
DE	97	Simon Vinton	Fr
DT	98	Jack Hansen	So
DT	99	Obald Niyonkuru	Jr

Special teams

Pos.	#	Name	Class
K	37	Drew Klein	Sr
K	38	Jayden Onuonga	Fr
P	39	Aaron Bickerton	Sr
LS	48	CJ Anderson	Sr
P	51	Caleb McGrath	Jr
LS	57	Gabe Vernetti	Fr

Head coach

- Tim Polasek

Coordinators/assistant coaches

- Dan Larson (offensive coordinator / tight ends / fullbacks)
- Grant Olson (defensive coordinator / linebackers)
- Carlton Littlejohn (special teams coordinator / defensive ends)
- Eric Amoako (cornerbacks)
- Joe Beschorner (quarterbacks)
- Dylan Chmura (offensive line)
- Steve Crutchley (wide receivers)
- Devin Klieman (safeties)
- Kody Morgan (defensive tackles)
- Sam Ojuri (running backs)
- Taylor Lucas (offensive quality control)
- Tony Moonen (defensive quality control)
- Brett Bostad (offensive analyst)
- Trae Tetzlaff (offensive analyst)
- David Wienke (defensive analyst)
- Marcus Williams (defensive analyst)

Legend

- (C) Team captain
- (S) Suspended
- (I) Ineligible
- Injured
- Redshirt

Roster
Last update: September 12, 2026
