= 2026 Air Force Falcons football team =

American college football season

2026 Air Force Falcons football
- Conference: Mountain West Conference
- Record: 9–2 (5–2 MW)
- Head coach: Troy Calhoun (20th season)
- Offensive coordinator: Mike Thiessen (18th season)
- Offensive scheme: Triple option
- Defensive coordinator: Steve Russ (7th season)
- Base defense: 3–4
- Home stadium: Falcon Stadium

Uniform
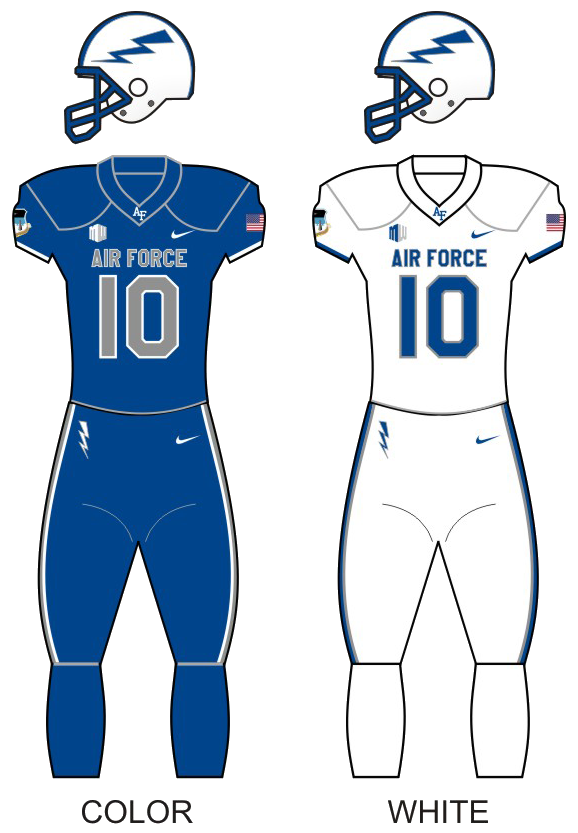

2026 Mountain West Conference football standings
	Conf.			Overall
Team	W		L	W		L
New Mexico	6	–	1	9	–	2
Wyoming	6	–	2	7	–	4
North Dakota State	5	–	2	8	–	2
Air Force	5	–	2	9	–	2
UNLV	4	–	2	6	–	4
Nevada	3	–	3	4	–	6
San Jose State	3	–	4	5	–	6
Hawaii	2	–	5	3	–	7
Northern Illinois	0	–	6	0	–	10
UTEP	0	–	7	1	–	10
Championship: December 4, 2026
As of November 21, 2026; Rankings from CFP rankings

The 2026 Air Force Falcons football team represents the United States Air Force Academy during the 2026 NCAA Division I FBS football season as a member of the Mountain West Conference (MW). The team plays their home games at Falcon Stadium and are led by 20th-year head coach Troy Calhoun.

== Personnel ==
=== Transfers ===
==== Outgoing ====
Player	Position	Destination

==== Incoming ====
Player	Position	Previous school

== Schedule ==
Date	Time	Opponent	Site	TV	Result	Attendance
September 5	11:00 a.m.	Duquesne (FCS)*	Falcon Stadium; USAF Academy, CO	MW+	W 34–0	26,703
September 12	8:00 p.m.	North Dakota State	Falcon Stadium; USAF Academy, CO	FS1	L 32–38	25,970
September 26	8:30 p.m.	at Nevada	Mackay Stadium; Reno, NV	FS1	W 36–33 ^{2OT}	20,673
October 3	10:00 a.m.	Navy*	Falcon Stadium; USAF Academy, CO (Commander-in-Chief's Trophy)	CBS	W 14–9	39,441
October 10	5:30 p.m.	at Northern Illinois	Huskie Stadium; DeKalb, IL	CBSSN	W 28–7	15,292
October 17	1:30 p.m.	UNLV	Falcon Stadium; USAF Academy, CO	CBSSN	W 41–31	23,636
October 23	7:00 p.m.	at Wyoming	War Memorial Stadium; Laramie, WY	The CW	L 14–28	18,490
October 31	1:00 p.m.	UConn*	Falcon Stadium; USAF Academy, CO	MW+	W 35–26	20,062
November 7	5:30 p.m.	at Army*	Michie Stadium; West Point, NY (Commander-in-Chief's Trophy, Big Noon Kickoff)	CBS	W 24–21	33,575
November 14	5:00 p.m.	San Jose State	Falcon Stadium; USAF Academy, CO	CBSSN	W 24–3	
November 20	6:00 p.m.	UTEP	Falcon Stadium; USAF Academy, CO	The CW	W 52–3	16,180
November 27	2:30 p.m.	at New Mexico	University Stadium; Albuquerque, NM	The CW		
*Non-conference game; All times are in Mountain time; Source:

== Game summaries ==
=== Duquesne (FCS) ===
Duquesne Dukes (FCS) (0–0) at Air Force Falcons (0–0) – Game summary

Quarter	1	2	3	4	Total
Dukes (FCS)	0	0	0	0	0
Falcons	7	13	7	7	34

at Falcon Stadium • Air Force Academy, Colorado

- Date: September 5
- Game time: 1:00 p.m.
- Game weather: Sunny • Temperature: 84 °F (29 °C) • Wind: NE at 3 mph
- Game attendance: 26,703
- Referee: Marcus Thornton
- TV announcers (MW+): Josh Howe and Ryan Kaufman

Game information

First quarter

- AFA – Kemper Hodges 4-yard run (Carter Cremascoli kick), 8:06. Falcons 7–0. Drive: 13 plays, 75 yards, 6:54.

Second quarter

- AFA – Liam Szarka 1-yard run (Carter Cremascoli kick), 12:17. Falcons 14–0. Drive: 15 plays, 80 yards, 8:02.
- AFA – Carter Cremascoli 21-yard field goal, 9:33. Falcons 17–0. Drive: 4 plays, 6 yards, 1:09.
- AFA – Carter Cremascoli 52-yard field goal, 4:04. Falcons 20–0. Drive: 9 plays, 37 yards, 4:33.

Third quarter

- AFA – Liam Szarka 2-yard run (Carter Cremascoli kick), 1:21. Falcons 27–0. Drive: 10 plays, 84 yards, 5:30.

Fourth quarter

- AFA – Evan Medders 4-yard run (Carter Cremascoli kick), 8:19. Falcons 34–0. Drive: 14 plays, 75 yards, 6:24.

Statistics	DUQ	AFA
First downs	8	28
Plays–yards	43–107	78–450
Rushes–yards	21–54	71–431
Passing yards	53	19
Passing: comp–att–int	9–22–2	3–7–0
Turnovers	2	0
Time of possession	19:10	40:50

Team	Category	Player	Statistics
Duquesne	Passing	Carson Camp	7/18, 42 yards, 2 INT
Duquesne	Rushing	Ness Davis	11 carries, 32 yards
Duquesne	Receiving	Antwon Thomas	3 receptions, 27 yards
Air Force	Passing	Liam Szarka	3/5, 19 yards
Air Force	Rushing	Rocco Conti	10 carries, 74 yards
Air Force	Receiving	Matt Long	1 reception, 18 yards

=== North Dakota State ===
North Dakota State Bison (2–0) at Air Force Falcons (1–0) – Game summary

Quarter	1	2	3	4	Total
Bison	7	21	7	3	38
Falcons	0	13	0	19	32

at Falcon Stadium • USAF Academy, Colorado

- Date: September 12, 2026
- Game time: 8:00 p.m.
- Game weather: Cloudy; 71 °F (22 °C); Wind: S 10 mph
- Game attendance: 25,970
- Referee: Patrick Foy
- TV announcers (FS1): Carlo Jiménez and Petros Papadakis

Game information

First quarter

- (9:54) NDSU – Myles Mitchell 31-yard run, Drew Klein kick (Drive: 9 plays, 75 yards, 5:06; North Dakota State 7–0)

Second quarter

- (14:08) NDSU – Nathan Hayes 17-yard run, Drew Klein kick (Drive: 16 plays, 80 yards, 8:44; North Dakota State 14–0)
- (8:14) AFA – Adam Hrynciw 29-yard pass from Mason Hayes, Carter Cremascoli kick (Drive: 5 plays, 72 yards, 2:34; North Dakota State 14–7)
- (5:20) NDSU – Mekhi Collins 44-yard pass from Nathan Hayes, Drew Klein kick (Drive: 5 plays, 75 yards, 2:54; North Dakota State 21–7)
- (1:48) AFA – Blake Fletcher 85-yard interception (North Dakota State 21–13)
- (0:29) NDSU – Myles Mitchell 1-yard run, Drew Klein kick (Drive: 6 plays, 65 yards, 1:19; North Dakota State 28–13)

Third quarter

- (12:02) NDSU – Logan Conklin 41-yard pass from Nathan Hayes, Drew Klein kick (Drive: 2 plays, 39 yards, 0:44; North Dakota State 35–13)

Fourth quarter

- (10:59) AFA – Liam Szarka 2-yard run (Drive: 14 plays, 73 yards, 7:19; North Dakota State 35–19)
- (4:26) AFA – Kemper Hodges 2-yard run (Drive: 13 plays, 80 yards, 4:20; North Dakota State 35–25)
- (1:58) NDSU – Drew Klein 56-yard field goal (Drive: 7 plays, 13 yards, 2:26; North Dakota State 38–25)
- (0:50) AFA – Matt Long 20-yard pass from Evan Medders, Carter Cremascoli kick (Drive: 8 plays, 75 yards, 1:08; North Dakota State 38–32)

Statistics	NDSU	AFA
First downs	18	21
Plays–yards	60–374	66–386
Rushes–yards	37–146	51–207
Passing yards	228	179
Passing: comp–att–int	15–23–1	9–15–1
Turnovers	1	1
Time of possession	29:05	30:55

Team	Category	Player	Statistics
North Dakota State	Passing	Nathan Hayes	15/23, 228 yards, 2 TD, INT
North Dakota State	Rushing	Myles Mitchell	15 carries, 61 yards, 2 TD
North Dakota State	Receiving	Logan Conklin	2 receptions, 57 yards, TD
Air Force	Passing	Liam Szarka	5/10, 103 yards, INT
Air Force	Rushing	Liam Szarka	21 carries, 88 yards, TD
Air Force	Receiving	Matt Long	2 receptions, 55 yards, TD

=== at Nevada ===
Air Force Falcons (1–1) at Nevada Wolf Pack (1–2) – Game summary

Quarter	1	2	3	4	OT	2OT	Total
Falcons	3	7	3	14	3	6	36
Wolf Pack	10	0	7	10	3	3	33

at Mackay Stadium • Reno, Nevada

- Date: September 26
- Game time: 8:30 p.m.
- Game weather: Cloudy • Temperature: 67 °F (19 °C) • Wind: E at 11 mph
- Game attendance: 20,673
- Referee: Cal McNeill
- TV announcers (FS1): Noah Reed and Petros Papadakis

Game information

First quarter
Second quarter
Third quarter
Fourth quarter

Statistics	AFA	NEV
First downs	24	20
Plays–yards	83–455	66–411
Rushes–yards	70–363	35–187
Passing yards	92	224
Passing: Comp–Att–Int	5–13–1	18–31–0
Turnovers	1	0
Time of possession	36:04	23:56

Team	Category	Player	Statistics
Air Force	Passing	Liam Szarka	5/12, 92 yards, TD, INT
Air Force	Rushing	Liam Szarka	33 carries, 171 yards, 2 TD
Air Force	Receiving	Simon Kibbee	2 receptions, 53 yards
Nevada	Passing	Carter Jones	18/30, 224 yards
Nevada	Rushing	Herschel Turner	11 carries, 111 yards, 2 TD
Nevada	Receiving	Donnie Cheers	1 reception, 50 yards

=== Navy (Commander-in-Chief's Trophy) ===
Navy Midshipmen (1–2) at Air Force Falcons (2–1) – Game summary

Quarter	1	2	3	4	Total
Midshipmen	0	3	6	0	9
Falcons	0	14	0	0	14

at Falcon Stadium • USAF Academy, Colorado

- Date: October 3
- Game time: 12:00 p.m. EDT
- Game weather: Sunny • Temperature: 71 °F (22 °C) • Wind: NW at 9 mph
- Game attendance: 39,441
- Referee: Tim Rich
- TV announcers (CBS): Rich Waltz (play-by-play), Adam Breneman (analyst), Brian Kelly (analyst) and Jordan Giorgio (sideline)

Game information

First quarter
Second quarter
Third quarter
Fourth quarter

Statistics	NAVY	AFA
First downs	11	17
Plays–yards	48–253	71–270
Rushes–yards	30–110	59–188
Passing yards	143	82
Passing: comp–att–int	8–18–0	6–12–2
Turnovers	1	2
Time of possession	23:59	36:01

Team	Category	Player	Statistics
Navy	Passing	Jackson Gutierrez	7/15, 140 yards, TD
Navy	Rushing	Michael Barrow	9 carries, 44 yards
Navy	Receiving	Truman Brasfield	1 reception, 68 yards, TD
Air Force	Passing	Liam Szarka	6/11, 82 yards, 2 INT
Air Force	Rushing	Liam Szarka	25 carries, 81 yards, 2 TD
Air Force	Receiving	Jonah Dawson	3 receptions, 39 yards

=== at Northern Illinois ===
Air Force Falcons (3–1) at Northern Illinois Huskies (0–4) – Game summary

Quarter	1	2	3	4	Total
Falcons	7	7	14	0	28
Huskies	0	7	0	0	7

at Huskie Stadium • DeKalb, Illinois

- Date: October 10
- Game time: 5:30 p.m.
- Game weather: Sunny • Temperature: 72 °F (22 °C) • Wind: N at 12 mph
- Game attendance: 15,292
- Referee: Christian Watson
- TV announcers (CBSSN): Jordan Kent (play-by-play), Robert Turbin (analyst), Jaclyn DeAugustino (sideline)

Game information

First quarter

Second quarter

Third quarter

Fourth quarter

Statistics	AFA	NIU
First downs	26	13
Plays–yards	68–439	43–253
Rushes–yards	67–439	23–113
Passing yards	0	140
Passing: Comp–Att–Int	0–1–0	13–20–1
Turnovers	0	1
Time of possession	39:09	20:51

Team	Category	Player	Statistics
Air Force	Passing	Kemper Hodges	0/1, 0 yards
Air Force	Rushing	Evan Medders	16 carries, 114 yards, 2 TD
Air Force	Receiving	—N/a	—N/a
Northern Illinois	Passing	Taron Dickens	13/20, 140 yards, INT
Northern Illinois	Rushing	Telly Johnson Jr.	8 carries, 47 yards, TD
Northern Illinois	Receiving	DeAree Rogers	7 receptions, 81 yards

=== UNLV ===
UNLV Rebels (4–2) at Air Force Falcons (4–1) – Game summary

Quarter	1	2	3	4	Total
Rebels	0	17	7	7	31
Falcons	3	10	7	21	41

at Falcon Stadium • USAF Academy, CO

- Date: October 17
- Game time: 12:30 p.m. PDT
- Game weather: Sunny • Temperature: 68 °F (20 °C)
- Game attendance: 23,636
- Referee: Kenneth Ray
- TV announcers (CBSSN): Jordan Kent (play-by-play), Robert Turbin (analyst), Hailey Sutton (sideline)

Game information

First quarter
Second quarter
Third quarter
Fourth quarter

Statistics	UNLV	AFA
First downs	22	25
Plays–yards	65–376	65–448
Rushes–yards	32–130	62–430
Passing yards	246	18
Passing: comp–att–int	21–33–1	2–3–0
Turnovers	2	0
Time of possession	24:47	35:13

Team	Category	Player	Statistics
UNLV	Passing	Jackson Arnold	21/33, 246 yards, 2 TD, INT
UNLV	Rushing	Jackson Arnold	13 carries, 78 yards, TD
UNLV	Receiving	Kayden McGee	5 receptions, 99 yards, 2 TD
Air Force	Passing	Evan Medders	2/3, 18 yards
Air Force	Rushing	Evan Medders	18 carries, 152 yards, 3 TD
Air Force	Receiving	Simon Kibbee	1 reception, 18 yards

=== at Wyoming ===
Air Force Falcons (5–1) at Wyoming Cowboys (4–3) – Game summary

Quarter	1	2	3	4	Total
Falcons	3	3	8	0	14
Cowboys	14	7	0	7	28

at War Memorial Stadium • Laramie, Wyoming

- Date: October 23
- Game time: 7:00 p.m.
- Game attendance: 18,490
- TV announcers (The CW): Chris Fisher (play by play), Isaiah Stanback (analyst), & Bryan Walters (reporter)

Game information

First quarter
Second quarter
Third quarter
Fourth quarter

Statistics	AFA	WYO
First downs		
Plays–yards		
Rushes–yards		
Passing yards		
Passing: comp–att–int		
Turnovers		
Time of possession		

Team	Category	Player	Statistics
Air Force	Passing		
Air Force	Rushing		
Air Force	Receiving		
Wyoming	Passing		
Wyoming	Rushing		
Wyoming	Receiving		

=== UConn ===
UConn Huskies (4–3) at Air Force Falcons (5–2) – Game summary

Quarter	1	2	3	4	Total
Huskies	0	14	6	6	26
Falcons	14	7	7	7	35

at Falcon Stadium • Air Force Academy, Colorado

- Date: October 31
- Game time: 1:00 p.m.
- Game weather: Sunny • Temperature: 62 °F (17 °C) • Wind: S at 8 miles per hour (13 km/h)
- Game attendance: 20,062
- Referee: Riley Johnson
- TV announcers (MW+): Josh Howe (play-by-play) and Ryan Kaufman (analyst)

Game information

First quarter

- AF - Hodges, Kemper 7 yd run (Cremascoli, Carter kick), 8:43. Falcons 7–0. Drive: 10 plays, 55 yards, TOP 05:25
- AF - Hodges, Kemper 62 yd run (Cremascoli, Carter kick), 1:27. Falcons 14–0. Drive: 2 plays, 67 yards, TOP 00:45

Second quarter

- CONN - Cornist, Trey 1 yd run (O'Connor, Jack kick), 11:55. Falcons 14–7. Drive: 10 plays, 75 yards, TOP 04:32
- AF - Hodges, Kemper 3 yd run (Cremascoli, Carter kick), 5:53. Falcons 21–7. Drive: 11 plays, 77 yards, TOP 05:57
- CONN - Treadway, Ryder 2 yd pass from Osborne, Kalieb (O'Connor, Jack kick), 1:56. Falcons 21–14. Drive: 10 plays, 75 yards, TOP 03:57

Third quarter

- AF - LaDue, Gage 4 yd run (Cremascoli, Carter kick), 2:34. Falcons 28–14. Drive: 16 plays, 81 yards, TOP 09:40
- CONN - Godavitarne, Alex 55 yd pass from Osborne, Kalieb (Kick no good), 2:04. Falcons 28–20. Drive: 2 plays, 75 yards, TOP 00:30

Fourth quarter

- CONN - Christian, Kenji 46 yd run (Pass no good), 14:46. Falcons 28–26. Drive: 4 plays, 87 yards, TOP 00:54
- AF - Hodges, Kemper 1 yd run (Cremascoli, Carter kick), 3:09. Falcons 35–26. Drive: 19 plays, 75 yards, TOP 11:37

Statistics	CONN	AFA
First downs	18	24
Plays–yards	54–368	77–366
Rushes–yards	21–105	74–366
Passing yards	263	0
Passing: comp–att–int	17–33–0	0–3–0
Turnovers	0	0
Time of possession	18:06	41:54

Team	Category	Player	Statistics
UConn	Passing	Kalieb Osborne	17/33, 263 yards, 2 TD
UConn	Rushing	Kenji Christian	5 carries, 68 yards, TD
UConn	Receiving	Alex Godavitarne	1 reception, 55 yards, TD
Air Force	Passing	Kemper Hodges	0/1, 0 yards
Air Force	Rushing	Kemper Hodges	35 carries, 200 yards, 4 TD
Air Force	Receiving	—N/a	—N/a

=== at Army (Commander-in-Chief's Trophy) ===
Air Force Falcons (6–2) at Army Black Knights (5–3) – Game summary

Quarter	1	2	Total
Falcons			0
Black Knights			0

at Michie Stadium • West Point, New York

- Date: November 7
- Game time: 7:30 p.m. EST
- Game attendance: 33,575
- TV: CBS

Game information

First quarter
Second quarter
Third quarter
Fourth quarter

Statistics	AFA	ARMY
First downs		
Plays–yards		
Rushes–yards		
Passing yards		
Passing: comp–att–int		
Turnovers		
Time of possession		

Team	Category	Player	Statistics
Air Force	Passing		
Air Force	Rushing		
Air Force	Receiving		
Army	Passing		
Army	Rushing		
Army	Receiving		

=== San Jose State ===
San Jose State Spartans (5–5) at Air Force Falcons (7–2) – Game summary

Quarter	1	2	3	4	Total
Spartans	0	0	0	0	0
Falcons	0	0	0	0	0

at Falcon Stadium • USAF Academy, CO

- Date: November 14
- Game time: 5:00 p.m.
- Game weather: -
- Game attendance: -
- Referee: -
- TV: CBSSN

Game information

First quarter
Second quarter
Third quarter
Fourth quarter

Statistics	SJSU	AFA
First downs		
Plays–yards		
Rushes–yards		
Passing yards		
Passing: Comp–Att–Int		
Turnovers		
Time of possession		

Team	Category	Player	Statistics
San Jose State	Passing		
San Jose State	Rushing		
San Jose State	Receiving		
Air Force	Passing		
Air Force	Rushing		
Air Force	Receiving		

=== UTEP ===
UTEP Miners (1–9) at Air Force Falcons (8–2) – Game summary

Quarter	1	2	3	4	Total
Miners	0	0	0	0	0
Falcons	0	0	0	0	0

at Falcon Stadium • USAF Academy, CO

- Date: November 20
- Game time: 6:00 p.m.
- Game weather: -
- Game attendance: -
- Referee: -
- TV: The CW

Game information

First quarter
Second quarter
Third quarter
Fourth quarter

Statistics	UTEP	AFA
First downs		
Plays–yards		
Rushes–yards		
Passing yards		
Passing: Comp–Att–Int		
Turnovers		
Time of possession		

Team	Category	Player	Statistics
UTEP	Passing		
UTEP	Rushing		
UTEP	Receiving		
Air Force	Passing		
Air Force	Rushing		
Air Force	Receiving		

=== at New Mexico ===
Air Force Falcons (0–0) at New Mexico Lobos (0–0) – Game summary

Quarter	1	2	Total
Falcons			0
Lobos			0

at University Stadium • Albuquerque, New Mexico

- Date: November 27
- Game time: 2:30 p.m. MDT
- Game weather: TBD
- Game attendance: TBD
- Referee: TBD
- TV: The CW

Game information

First quarter

Second quarter

Third quarter

Fourth quarter

Statistics	AFA	UNM
First downs		
Plays–yards		
Rushes–yards		
Passing yards		
Passing: comp–att–int		
Turnovers		
Time of possession		

Team	Category	Player	Statistics
Air Force	Passing		
Air Force	Rushing		
Air Force	Receiving		
New Mexico	Passing		
New Mexico	Rushing		
New Mexico	Receiving		
