= 2026 Nevada Wolf Pack football team =

American college football season

2026 Nevada Wolf Pack football
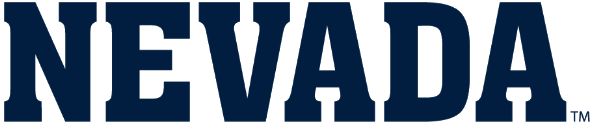
- Conference: Mountain West Conference
- Record: 5–6 (4–3 MW)
- Head coach: Jeff Choate (3rd season)
- Offensive coordinator: Brett Bartolone (1st season)
- Offensive scheme: Air raid
- Defensive coordinator: Kane Ioane (3rd season)
- Base defense: 4–2–5
- Home stadium: Mackay Stadium

2026 Mountain West Conference football standings
	Conf.			Overall
Team	W		L	W		L
New Mexico	6	–	1	9	–	2
North Dakota State	6	–	2	9	–	2
Wyoming	6	–	2	7	–	4
Air Force	5	–	2	9	–	2
UNLV	5	–	2	7	–	4
Nevada	4	–	3	5	–	6
San Jose State	3	–	5	5	–	7
Hawaii	2	–	6	3	–	8
UTEP	0	–	7	1	–	10
Northern Illinois	0	–	7	0	–	11
Championship: December 4, 2026
As of November 22, 2026; Rankings from CFP rankings

The 2026 Nevada Wolf Pack football team represents the University of Nevada, Reno in the Mountain West Conference (MW) during the 2026 NCAA Division I FBS football season. The Wolf Pack is led by Jeff Choate in his third year as head coach and they play their home games at Mackay Stadium, located in Reno, Nevada.

== Offseason ==
=== Transfers ===
==== Outgoing ====
Player	Position	Destination

==== Incoming ====
Player	Position	Previous school

== Schedule ==
Date	Time	Opponent	Site	TV	Result	Attendance
September 5	7:30 p.m.	Western Kentucky*	Mackay Stadium; Reno, NV	CBSSN	W 49–14	19,404
September 12	7:30 p.m.	No. 1 (FCS) Montana State*	Mackay Stadium; Reno, NV	The CW	L 7–20	21,679
September 19	4:00 p.m.	at Middle Tennessee*	Johnny "Red" Floyd Stadium; Murfreesboro, TN	ESPN+	L 20–27	16,106
September 26	7:30 p.m.	Air Force	Mackay Stadium; Reno, NV	FS1	L 33–36 ^{2OT}	20,673
October 10	4:00 p.m.	at UTEP	Sun Bowl; El Paso, TX	FS1	W 30–13	13,927
October 17	4:00 p.m.	at North Dakota State	Fargodome; Fargo, ND	CBSSN	L 17–31	18,261
October 24	2:00 p.m.	San Jose State	Mackay Stadium; Reno, NV	KNSN-TV/MW+	W 28–13	17,201
October 31	1:15 p.m.	at No. 7 UCLA*	Rose Bowl; Pasadena, CA	BTN	L 0–27	24,611
November 6	6:00 p.m.	New Mexico	Mackey Stadium; Reno, NV	CBSSN	L 3–31	15,290
November 14	12:30 p.m.	at Northern Illinois	Huskie Stadium; DeKalb, IL	KNSN-TV/MW+	W 28–7	6,354
November 21	7:30 p.m.	Hawaii	Mackay Stadium; Reno, NV	FS1	W 16–8	14,951
November 28	6:00 p.m.	at UNLV	Allegiant Stadium; Paradise, NV (Fremont Cannon)	CBSSN		
*Non-conference game; Rankings from AP Poll (and CFP Rankings after November 3) – Released prior to game; All times are in Pacific time; Source:

== Game summaries ==
=== Western Kentucky ===
Western Kentucky Hilltoppers (0–0) at Nevada Wolf Pack (0–0) – Game summary

Quarter	1	2	3	4	Total
Hilltoppers	0	7	0	7	14
Wolf Pack	14	7	14	14	49

at Mackay Stadium • Reno, Nevada

- Date: September 5
- Game time: 7:30 p.m
- Game weather: Clear • Temperature: 65 °F (18 °C) • Wind: SW at 14 miles per hour (23 km/h)
- Game attendance: 19,404
- Referee: Kenneth Ray
- TV announcers (CBS Sports Network): Rich Waltz, Adam Breneman and Jordan Giorgio

Game information

First quarter

- NEV – Dominic Kelley 72-yard run (Joe McFadden kick), 14:25. Wolf Pack 7–0. Drive: 2 plays, 75 yards, 0:35.
- NEV – Herschel Turner 8-yard run (Joe McFadden kick), 2:17. Wolf Pack 14–0. Drive: 11 plays, 88 yards, 4:25.

Second quarter

- WKU – Ajay Allen 4-yard run (Michael Smith kick), 5:20. Wolf Pack 14–7. Drive: 13 plays, 80 yards, 6:17.
- NEV – Donnie Cheers 20-yard run (Joe McFadden kick), 2:21. Wolf Pack 21–7. Drive: 3 plays, 96 yards, 1:07.

Third quarter

- NEV – Donnie Cheers 32-yard pass from Carter Jones (Joe McFadden kick), 11:01. Wolf Pack 28–7. Drive: 6 plays, 57 yards, 2:15.
- NEV – DJ Asiasi 14-yard pass from Carter Jones (Joe McFadden kick), 4:03. Wolf Pack 35–7. Drive: 5 plays, 55 yards, 2:03.

Fourth quarter

- NEV – Dominic Kelley 1-yard run (Joe McFadden kick), 7:38. Wolf Pack 42–7. Drive: 13 plays, 57 yards, 8:24.
- NEV – Carter Jackson 1-yard run (Joe McFadden kick), 6:07. Wolf Pack 49–7. Drive: 2 plays, 8 yards, 0:47.
- WKU – Ajay Allen 10-yard run (Michael Smith kick), 1:18. Wolf Pack 49–14. Drive: 12 plays, 75 yards, 4:49.

Statistics	WKU	NEV
First downs	23	20
Plays–yards	82–367	58–486
Rushes–yards	42–164	42–323
Passing yards	203	163
Passing: comp–att–int	24–40–0	9–16–1
Turnovers	2	1
Time of possession	32:33	27:27

Team	Category	Player	Statistics
Western Kentucky	Passing	Rodney Tisdale, Jr.	24/40, 203 yards
Western Kentucky	Rushing	Ajay Allen	21 carries, 102 yards, 2 TD
Western Kentucky	Receiving	Cameron Flowers	7 receptions, 60 yards
Nevada	Passing	Carter Jones	9/15, 163 yards, 2 TD, INT
Nevada	Rushing	Dominic Kelley	11 carries, 152 yards, 2 TD
Nevada	Receiving	Gary Givens III	2 receptions, 83 yards

=== No. 1 (FCS) Montana State ===
No. 1 (FCS) Montana State Bobcats (2–0) at Nevada Wolf Pack (1–0) – Game summary

Quarter	1	2	3	4	Total
No. 1 (FCS) Bobcats	10	7	0	3	20
Wolf Pack	0	0	0	7	7

at Mackay Stadium • Reno, Nevada

- Date: September 12
- Game time: 7:30 p.m.
- Game weather: Clear • Temperature: 70 °F (21 °C) • Wind: NE at 13 miles per hour (21 km/h)
- Game attendance: 21,679
- Referee: Brad Carrell
- TV announcers (The CW): Jack McMullen, Cody Kessler and Marshall Newhouse

Game information

First quarter

- MTST – Dane Steel 24-yard pass from Justin Lamson (Myles Sansted kick), 12:05. Bobcats 7–0. Drive: 7 plays, 75 yards, 2:55.
- MTST – Myles Sansted 45-yard field goal, 1:35. Bobcats 10–0. Drive: 8 plays, 49 yards, 2:40.

Second quarter

- MTST – Adam Jones 6-yard run (Myles Sansted kick), 5:39. Bobcats 17–0. Drive: 10 plays, 79 yards, 5:29.

Third quarter

- No scoring plays.

Fourth quarter

- NEV – Marshaun Brown 28-yard pass from AJ Bianco (Joe McFadden kick), 11:38. Bobcats 17–7. Drive: 8 plays, 65 yards, 3:00.
- MTST – Myles Sansted 29-yard field goal, 1:10. Bobcats 20–7. Drive: 7 plays, 11 yards, 3:39.

Statistics	MTST	NEV
First downs	21	22
Plays–yards	63–330	71–349
Rushes–yards	40–151	35–182
Passing yards	179	167
Passing: comp–att–int	15–23–0	19–36–3
Turnovers	0	4
Time of possession	32:42	27:18

Team	Category	Player	Statistics
Montana State	Passing	Justin Lamson	15/23, 179 yards, TD
Montana State	Rushing	Adam Jones	25 carries, 86 yards, TD
Montana State	Receiving	Taco Dowler	4 receptions, 44 yards
Nevada	Passing	AJ Bianco	12/20, 116 yards, TD, INT
Nevada	Rushing	Dominic Kelley	17 carries, 84 yards
Nevada	Receiving	Marshaun Brown	3 receptions, 44 yards, TD

=== at Middle Tennessee ===
Nevada Wolf Pack (1–1) at Middle Tennessee Blue Raiders (1–1) – Game summary

Quarter	1	2	3	4	Total
Wolf Pack	7	3	7	3	20
Blue Raiders	7	3	7	10	27

at Johnny "Red" Floyd Stadium • Murfreesboro, Tennessee

- Date: September 19
- Game time: 4:00 p.m. PDT
- Game weather: Sunny • Temperature: 88 °F (31 °C) • Wind: SE at 3 miles per hour
- Game attendance: 16,106
- Referee: Douglas Mercer
- TV announcers (ESPN+): Jake Rose (play-by-play), Jeremy Kellem (analyst) and Emmy Fazenbaker (sideline)

Game information

First quarter
Second quarter
Third quarter
Fourth quarter

Statistics	NEV	MTSU
First downs	15	19
Plays–yards	58–280	67–330
Rushes–yards	33–95	38–157
Passing yards	185	173
Passing: comp–att–int	15–25–1	16–29–0
Turnovers	3	0
Time of possession	25:32	34:28

Team	Category	Player	Statistics
Nevada	Passing	Carter Jones	15/25, 185 yards, INT
Nevada	Rushing	Dominic Kelley	13 carries, 45 yards, TD
Nevada	Receiving	Damien Morgan	4 receptions, 60 yards
Middle Tennessee	Passing	Roman Gagliano	16/29, 173 yards, 2 TD
Middle Tennessee	Rushing	Antonio Martin Jr.	23 carries, 104 yards, TD
Middle Tennessee	Receiving	Markus Allen	3 receptions, 65 yards

=== Air Force ===
Air Force Falcons (1–1) at Nevada Wolf Pack (1–2) – Game summary

Quarter	1	2	3	4	OT	2OT	Total
Falcons	3	7	3	14	3	6	36
Wolf Pack	10	0	7	10	3	3	33

at Mackay Stadium • Reno, NV

- Date: September 26
- Game time: 7:30 p.m.
- Game weather: -
- Game attendance: 20,673
- Referee: -
- TV announcers (FS1): Noah Reed and Petros Papadakis

Game information

First quarter
Second quarter
Third quarter
Fourth quarter

Statistics	AFA	NEV
First downs		
Plays–yards		
Rushes–yards		
Passing yards		
Passing: Comp–Att–Int		
Turnovers		
Time of possession		

Team	Category	Player	Statistics
Air Force	Passing		
Air Force	Rushing		
Air Force	Receiving		
Nevada	Passing		
Nevada	Rushing		
Nevada	Receiving		

=== at UTEP ===
Nevada Wolf Pack (1–3) at UTEP Miners (1–4) – Game summary

Quarter	1	2	3	4	Total
Wolf Pack	7	6	10	7	30
Miners	0	7	0	6	13

at Sun Bowl • El Paso, TX

- Date: October 10, 2026
- Game time: 4:00 p.m.
- Game weather: -
- Game attendance: 13,927
- Referee: -
- TV announcers (FS1): Connor Onion and Spencer Tillman

Game information

First quarter
Second quarter
Third quarter
Fourth quarter

Statistics	NEV	UTEP
First downs		
Plays–yards		
Rushes–yards		
Passing yards		
Passing: comp–att–int		
Turnovers		
Time of possession		

Team	Category	Player	Statistics
Nevada	Passing		
Nevada	Rushing		
Nevada	Receiving		
UTEP	Passing		
UTEP	Rushing		
UTEP	Receiving		

=== at North Dakota State ===
Nevada Wolf Pack (2–3) at North Dakota State Bison (5–1) – Game summary

Quarter	1	2	3	4	Total
Wolf Pack	0	11	6	0	17
Bison	0	19	5	7	31

at Fargodome, Fargo, ND

- Date: October 17, 2026
- Game time: 4:00 p.m.
- Game weather: Indoors; 70 °F (21 °C)
- Game attendance: 18,261
- Referee: Christian Watson
- TV announcers (CBSSN): Chris Lewis (play-by-play) and Doug Pederson (analyst)

Game information

First quarter

No scoring plays

Second quarter

- (14:15) NEV – AJ Bianco 15-yard run, Trace Estes rush (Drive: 11 plays, 65 yards, 4:52; Nevada 8–0)
- (10:00) NEV – Joe McFadden 39-yard field goal (Drive: 4 plays, 3 yards, 1:25; Nevada 11–0)
- (6:04) NDSU – Nathan Hayes 5-yard run (Drive: 8 plays, 71 yards, 3:49; Nevada 11–6)
- (0:21) NDSU – Mekhi Collins 21-yard pass from Nathan Hayes (Drive: 14 plays, 77 yards, 4:07; North Dakota State 12–11)
- (0:00) NDSU – Jackson Williams 100-yard blocked field goal return, Drew Klein kick (North Dakota State 19–11)

Third quarter

- (11:25) NEV – Gary Givens III 19-yard pass from AJ Bianco (Drive: 6 plays, 51 yards, 1:49; North Dakota State 19–17)
- (11:25) NDSU – Matthew Stenbroten 74-yard PAT return (North Dakota State 21–17)
- (5:12) NDSU – Drew Klein 39-yard field goal (Drive: 7 plays, 15 yards, 3:30; North Dakota State 24–17)

Fourth quarter

- (14:08) NDSU – Reis Kessel 12-yard pass from Nathan Hayes, Drew Klein kick (Drive: 6 plays, 63 yards, 3:49; North Dakota State 31–17)

Statistics	NEV	NDSU
First downs	15	19
Plays–yards	57–286	70–345
Rushes–yards	21–96	45–192
Passing yards	190	153
Passing: comp–att–int	17–36–2	19–25–0
Turnovers	2	0
Time of possession	21:51	38:09

Team	Category	Player	Statistics
Nevada	Passing	AJ Bianco	17/34, 190 yards, TD, 2 INT
Nevada	Rushing	Dominic Kelley	11 carries, 60 yards
Nevada	Receiving	Gary Givens III	3 receptions, 50 yards, TD
North Dakota State	Passing	Nathan Hayes	19/25, 153 yards, 2 TD
North Dakota State	Rushing	Myles Mitchell	13 carries, 49 yards
North Dakota State	Receiving	Jackson Williams	5 receptions, 58 yards

=== San Jose State ===
San Jose State Spartans (4–3) at Nevada Wolf Pack (2–4) – Game summary

Quarter	1	2	3	4	Total
Spartans	0	3	0	10	13
Wolf Pack	7	0	7	14	28

at Mackay Stadium • Reno, NV

- Date: October 24, 2026
- Game time: 2:00 p.m.
- Game weather: -
- Game attendance: 17,201
- Referee: -
- TV announcers (MW+): Mike Stefansson, Zach Madonick and McKenna Rowland

Game information

First quarter
Second quarter
Third quarter
Fourth quarter

Statistics	SJSU	NEV
First downs		
Plays–yards		
Rushes–yards		
Passing yards		
Passing: Comp–Att–Int		
Turnovers		
Time of possession		

Team	Category	Player	Statistics
San Jose State	Passing		
San Jose State	Rushing		
San Jose State	Receiving		
Nevada	Passing		
Nevada	Rushing		
Nevada	Receiving		

=== at No. 7 UCLA ===
Nevada Wolf Pack (3–4) at No. 7 UCLA Bruins (7–0) – Game summary

Quarter	1	2	3	4	Total
Wolf Pack	0	0	0	0	0
No. 7 Bruins	10	7	7	3	27

at Rose Bowl • Pasadena, California

- Date: October 31
- Game time: 1:15 p.m.
- Game weather: Cloudy • Temperature: 67 °F (19 °C) • Wind: SE at 4 miles per hour (6.4 km/h)
- Game attendance: 24,611
- Referee: Gregory Blum
- TV announcers (BTN): A.J. Kanell (play-by-play), Brett Hundley (analyst), and Emma Carpenter (sideline)

Game information

First quarter
Second quarter
Third quarter
Fourth quarter

Statistics	NEV	UCLA
First downs	10	14
Plays–yards	59–176	59–303
Rushes–yards	35–65	29–125
Passing yards	111	178
Passing: comp–att–int	8–24–4	16–30–0
Time of possession	30:44	29:16

Team	Category	Player	Statistics
Nevada	Passing		
Nevada	Rushing		
Nevada	Receiving		
UCLA	Passing		
UCLA	Rushing		
UCLA	Receiving		

=== New Mexico ===
New Mexico Lobos (7–1) at Nevada Wolf Pack (3–5) – Game summary

Quarter	1	2	Total
Lobos			0
Wolf Pack			0

at Mackay Stadium • Reno, Nevada

- Date: November 6
- Game time: 6:00 p.m.
- Game weather: TBD
- Game attendance: TBD
- Referee: TBD
- TV announcers (CBS Sports Network): Jack Gordon and Taylor McHargue

Game information

First quarter

Second quarter

Third quarter

Fourth quarter

Statistics	UNM	NEV
First downs		
Plays–yards		
Rushes–yards		
Passing yards		
Passing: comp–att–int		
Turnovers		
Time of possession		

Team	Category	Player	Statistics
New Mexico	Passing		
New Mexico	Rushing		
New Mexico	Receiving		
Nevada	Passing		
Nevada	Rushing		
Nevada	Receiving		

=== at Northern Illinois ===
Nevada Wolf Pack (3–6) at Northern Illinois Huskies (0–9) – Game summary

Quarter	1	2	3	4	Total
Wolf Pack	0	0	0	0	0
Huskies	0	0	0	0	0

at Huskie Stadium • DeKalb, Illinois

- Date: November 14
- Game time: 12:30 p.m.
- TV announcers (MW+): Matt Rodewald (play-by-play) and Clay Harbor (analyst)

Game information

First quarter
Second quarter
Third quarter
Fourth quarter

Statistics	NEV	NIU
First downs		
Plays–yards		
Rushes–yards		
Passing yards		
Passing: comp–att–int		
Turnovers		
Time of possession		

Team	Category	Player	Statistics
Nevada	Passing		
Nevada	Rushing		
Nevada	Receiving		
Northern Illinois	Passing		
Northern Illinois	Rushing		
Northern Illinois	Receiving		

=== Hawaii ===
Hawaii Rainbow Warriors (3–7) at Nevada Wolf Pack (4–6) – Game summary

Quarter	1	2	3	4	Total
Rainbow Warriors	0	0	0	0	0
Wolf Pack	0	0	0	0	0

at Mackay Stadium • Reno, Nevada

- Date: November 21
- Game time: 7:30 p.m.
- Game weather: -
- Game attendance: -
- Referee: -
- TV announcers (FS1): Trent Rush and Sherdrick Bonner

Game information

First quarter
Second quarter
Third quarter
Fourth quarter

Statistics	HAW	NEV
First downs		
Plays–yards		
Rushes–yards		
Passing yards		
Passing: comp–att–int		
Turnovers		
Time of possession		

Team	Category	Player	Statistics
Hawaii	Passing		
Hawaii	Rushing		
Hawaii	Receiving		
Nevada	Passing		
Nevada	Rushing		
Nevada	Receiving		

=== at UNLV (Fremont Cannon) ===
Nevada Wolf Pack (0–0) at UNLV Rebels (0–0) – Game summary

Quarter	1	2	3	4	Total
Wolf Pack	0	0	0	0	0
Rebels	0	0	0	0	0

at Allegiant Stadium • Paradise, Nevada

- Date: November 28
- Game time: 6:00 p.m. PDT
- Game weather: None (indoor stadium)
- TV: CBSSN

Game information

First quarter
Second quarter
Third quarter
Fourth quarter

Statistics	NEV	UNLV
First downs		
Plays–yards		
Rushes–yards		
Passing yards		
Passing: comp–att–int		
Turnovers		
Time of possession		

Team	Category	Player	Statistics
Nevada	Passing		
Nevada	Rushing		
Nevada	Receiving		
UNLV	Passing		
UNLV	Rushing		
UNLV	Receiving		
