= Battle of the Basins =

College football rivalry, North Dakota State–Wyoming

- North Dakota State Bison Wyoming Cowboys
- Sport: College football
- First meeting: September 13, 2008; Wyoming, 16–13
- Latest meeting: October 3, 2026; North Dakota State, 28–0
- Next meeting: TBA, 2027
- Stadiums: Fargodome; Fargo, North Dakota, U.S. War Memorial Stadium; Laramie, Wyoming, U.S.
- Trophy: Drill Bit (2026–present)

Statistics
- Total meetings: 2
- All-time series: Tied, 1–1
- Trophy series: North Dakota State leads, 1–0
- Largest victory: North Dakota State, 28–0 (2026)
- Longest win streak: North Dakota State, 1 (2026–present); Wyoming 1 (2008)
- Current win streak: North Dakota State, 1 (2026–present)

Locations of North Dakota State and Wyoming

The Battle of the Basins is an American college football rivalry between the North Dakota State Bison and Wyoming Cowboys. The first game between the teams took place on September 13, 2008. The series is tied, 1–1.

== History ==
On September 13, 2008, Wyoming played North Dakota State, the No. 1 ranked team in the NCAA Division I Football Championship Subdivision (FCS), for the first time. Wyoming would win the contest 16–13 on a game-winning field goal by Jake Scott.

On February 8, 2026, it was announced that North Dakota State would move up to the NCAA Division I Football Bowl Subdivision (FBS) and join the Mountain West Conference (MW) after winning 10 FCS national championships since their move from NCAA Division II in 2004. On September 28, it was announced that North Dakota State and fellow conference member Wyoming would play for a new traveling trophy. The series would be called the "Battle of the Basins" with the North Dakota Petroleum Council serving as the game's sponsor. The new traveling trophy will feature a drill bit from an oil field to honor the rich history of the petroleum industry in both states. On October 3, North Dakota State shut out Wyoming in the first game of the trophy series, 28–0.

== Game results ==
North Dakota State victories	Wyoming victories	Tie games

No.	Date	Location	Winning team		Losing team	
1	September 13, 2008	Laramie, WY	Wyoming	16	#1 (FCS) North Dakota State	13
2	October 3, 2026	Fargo, ND	North Dakota State	28	Wyoming	0
3	TBA, 2027	Laramie, WY				
Series: Tied 1–1

=== Record by location ===
Stadium	Location	Games	North Dakota State victories	Wyoming victories
Fargodome	Fargo, North Dakota	1	1	0
War Memorial Stadium	Laramie, Wyoming	1	0	1

=== Record by coach ===
==== North Dakota State ====
Head coach	Tenure	Games	Wins	Losses	Pct.
Craig Bohl	2003–2013	1	0	1	.000
Tim Polasek	2024–present	1	1	0	1.000

==== Wyoming ====
Head coach	Tenure	Games	Wins	Losses	Pct.
Joe Glenn	2003–2008	1	1	0	1.000
Jay Sawvel	2024–present	1	0	1	.000

== See also ==
- List of NCAA college football rivalry games
