= Carlo Jiménez =

American sports commentator (born c.2001)

Carlo Jiménez (born c. 2000) is an American sports commentator who is the current radio announcer for the Los Angeles Clippers. Jiménez also is a play-by-play commentator for select games for Fox CBB and Fox CFB.

Of Latino heritage, Jiménez is the grandson of writer Francisco Jiménez, who immigrated to the United States as a child. He began working as a sportscaster during high school, including games for Bellarmine College Preparatory. While attending the University of Southern California, he received the Jim Nantz Award, a national award for sportscasters. He was also sports director of KXSC while attending. After graduating in 2023, he replaced Noah Eagle as the Los Angeles Clippers' radio play-by-play announcer, on KLAC. He posts his work as an announcer on TikTok and Instagram. He is one of the youngest and one of the few Latino announcers of the National Basketball Association.
