= Tyler Hughes (quarterback) =

American football player (born 2003)

No. 6 – Wyoming Cowboys
- Position: Quarterback
- Class: Redshirt Senior

Personal information
- Born: December 18, 2003 (age 22)
- Listed height: 6 ft 0 in (1.83 m)
- Listed weight: 214 lb (97 kg)

Career information
- High school: Marietta (Marietta, Georgia)
- College: William & Mary (2022–2025); Wyoming (2026–present)
- Stats at ESPN

Tyler Hughes (born December 18, 2003) is an American football quarterback for the Wyoming Cowboys. He previously played for the William & Mary Tribe.

== Early life ==
Hughes attended Marietta High School in Marietta, Georgia. He committed to play college football for the William & Mary Tribe.

== College career ==
=== William & Mary ===
In his first three seasons from 2022 to 2024, Hughes completed 19 of 39 passes for 339 yards and three touchdowns, while adding 228 yards and four touchdowns on the ground. Heading into the 2025 season, he was named the Tribe's starting quarterback. During the 2025 season, Hughes passed for 2,330 yards and 20 touchdowns, while adding 670 yards and 11 touchdowns on the ground. After the conclusion of the season, he entered the NCAA transfer portal.

=== Wyoming ===
Hughes transferred to play for the Wyoming Cowboys. Heading into the 2026 season, he was named the team's starting quarterback.
