= Marshall Newhouse =

American football player (born 1988)

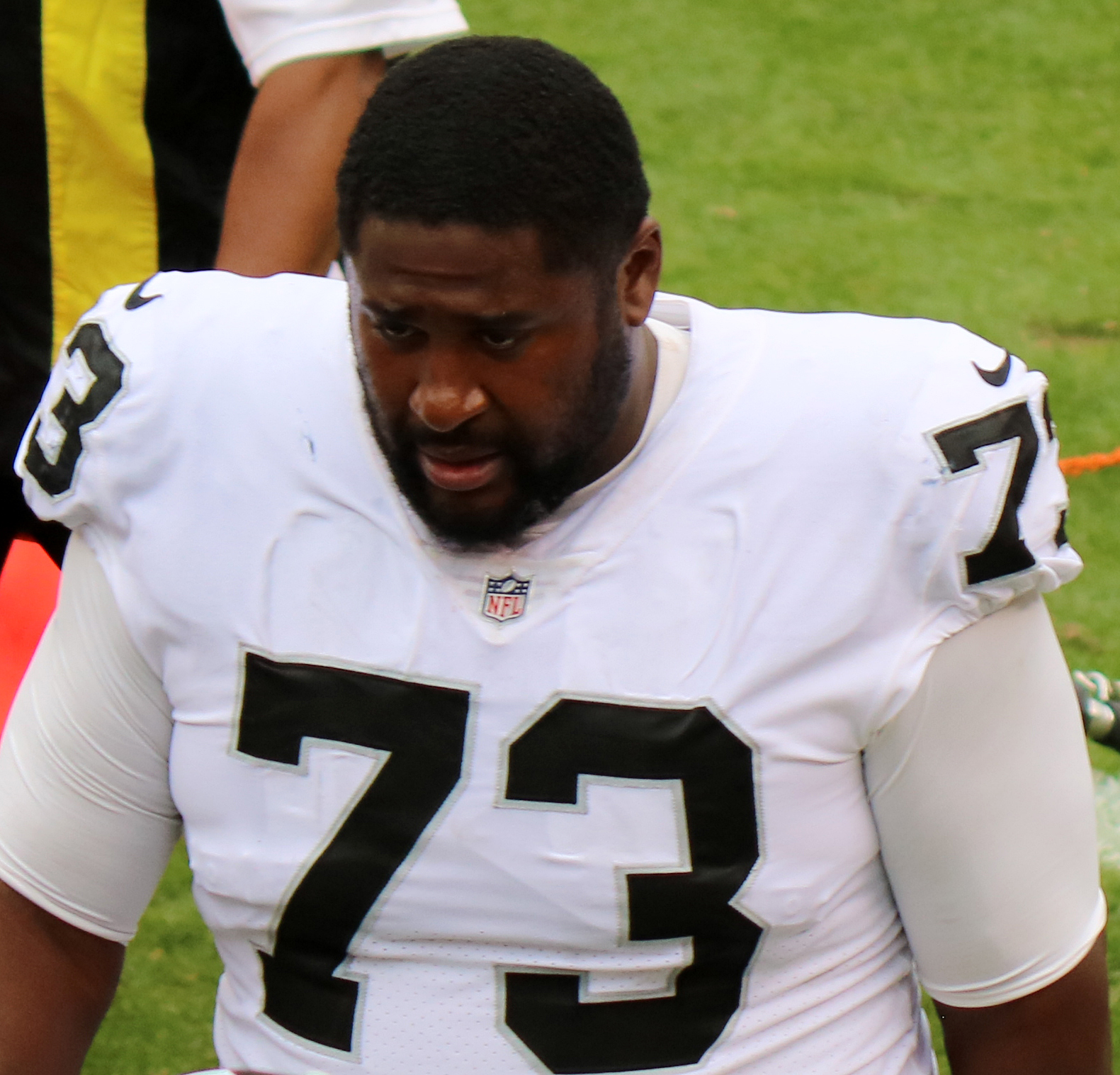
- Newhouse with the Oakland Raiders in 2017

No. 74, 73, 71, 72, 78
- Position: Offensive tackle

Personal information
- Born: September 29, 1988 (age 38); Dallas, Texas, U.S.
- Listed height: 6 ft 4 in (1.93 m)
- Listed weight: 330 lb (150 kg)

Career information
- High school: Lake Highlands (Dallas)
- College: TCU (2006–2009)
- NFL draft: 2010: 5th round, 169th overall pick

Career history
- Green Bay Packers (2010–2013); Cincinnati Bengals (2014); New York Giants (2015–2016); Oakland Raiders (2017); Buffalo Bills (2018); Carolina Panthers (2018); New Orleans Saints (2019)*; New England Patriots (2019); Tennessee Titans (2020)
- * Offseason or practice squad member only

Awards and highlights
- Super Bowl champion (XLV); First-team All-MW (2009); Second-team All-MW (2008)

Career NFL statistics
- Games played: 133
- Games started: 81
- Stats at Pro Football Reference

Marshall Edward Newhouse (born September 29, 1988) is an American former professional football player who was an offensive tackle in the National Football League (NFL). He was selected by the Green Bay Packers in the fifth round of the 2010 NFL draft and later won Super Bowl XLV with them over the Pittsburgh Steelers. Newhouse was also a member of the Cincinnati Bengals, New York Giants, Oakland Raiders, Buffalo Bills, Carolina Panthers, New Orleans Saints, New England Patriots, and Tennessee Titans. He played college football for the TCU Horned Frogs.

== Early life ==
Originally from Dallas, Texas, Newhouse attended Lake Highlands High School where he was a two-year letterman in football. He was named first-team all-district 10-5A and received Offensive Line MVP honors as a senior while also being named Lake Highlands' Most Outstanding Offensive Blocker. He also lettered in track & field in shot put, and was the 2006 UIL Texas State shot put champion. Newhouse also lettered in weightlifting, where he competed in powerlifting and earned a third-place finish in the 2005 state championships. He was also very active on campus at Lake Highlands as a member of the Horticulture Society and Japanese Club. He has one sibling, an older brother named John Newhouse.

== College career ==
Newhouse played college football at Texas Christian University. In his first year, he was the only true freshman to play on offense and totaled 10 knockdown blocks. He made his collegiate debut in the season-opening 17–7 win at Baylor where he recorded a knockdown block in that contest. His sophomore year, he was an honorable-mention All-Mountain West Conference, after he started all 13 games at left tackle and led TCU in knockdown blocks and overall blocking grade. He was named second-team All-Mountain West Conference his junior season after he started every game at left tackle for the second straight season, running his consecutive games started streak to 26. His senior year, he was first-team All-Mountain West Conference, leading him to be invited to the NFL Combine and to play in the East-West Shrine Game. He also appeared on the Rotary Lombardi Award Watch List after being ranked as the Best Offensive Lineman in the state of Texas by Dave Campbell's Texas Football. He was third-team All-American by Rivals.com and an honorable-mention All-America selection by SI.com.

== Professional career ==
=== Green Bay Packers ===
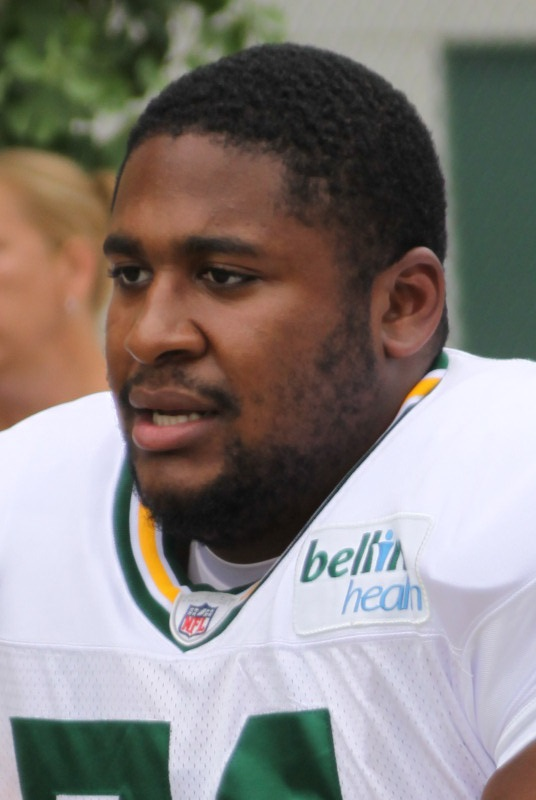
Newhouse with the Packers in 2011

The Green Bay Packers selected Newhouse in the fifth round of the 2010 NFL draft. On June 23, 2010, he signed a contract with the Packers.

Newhouse was inactive for every game in his rookie season before he was placed on injured reserve on December 31. Newhouse started at left tackle for 13 games during 2011 season when the Packers went 15–1. Newhouse continued as the Packers' starting left tackle for all 16 regular season games and 2 playoff games in 2012.

=== Cincinnati Bengals ===
On March 21, 2014, Newhouse signed a one-year deal worth $805,000 with the Cincinnati Bengals.

=== New York Giants ===
On March 10, 2015, Newhouse signed with the New York Giants.

=== Oakland Raiders ===
On March 11, 2017, Newhouse signed a two-year, $3,500,000 contract with the Oakland Raiders. He started 14 games at right tackle for the Raiders in 2017.

On March 12, 2018, Newhouse was released by the Raiders.

=== Buffalo Bills ===
On March 19, 2018, Newhouse signed a one-year contract with the Buffalo Bills. Newhouse came in to compete for the back up tackle role and possibly a chance to start. Newhouse would ultimately become a backup tackle and would be brought in for third and short packages.

=== Carolina Panthers ===
On September 25, 2018, Newhouse was traded to the Carolina Panthers for a conditional 2021 seventh-round draft pick, used to select Jack Anderson. He played in 11 games, starting two at left tackle in place of an injured Chris Clark.

=== New Orleans Saints ===
On May 22, 2019, Newhouse signed with the New Orleans Saints. He was placed on injured reserve on August 31, 2019, but was released the next day.

=== New England Patriots ===
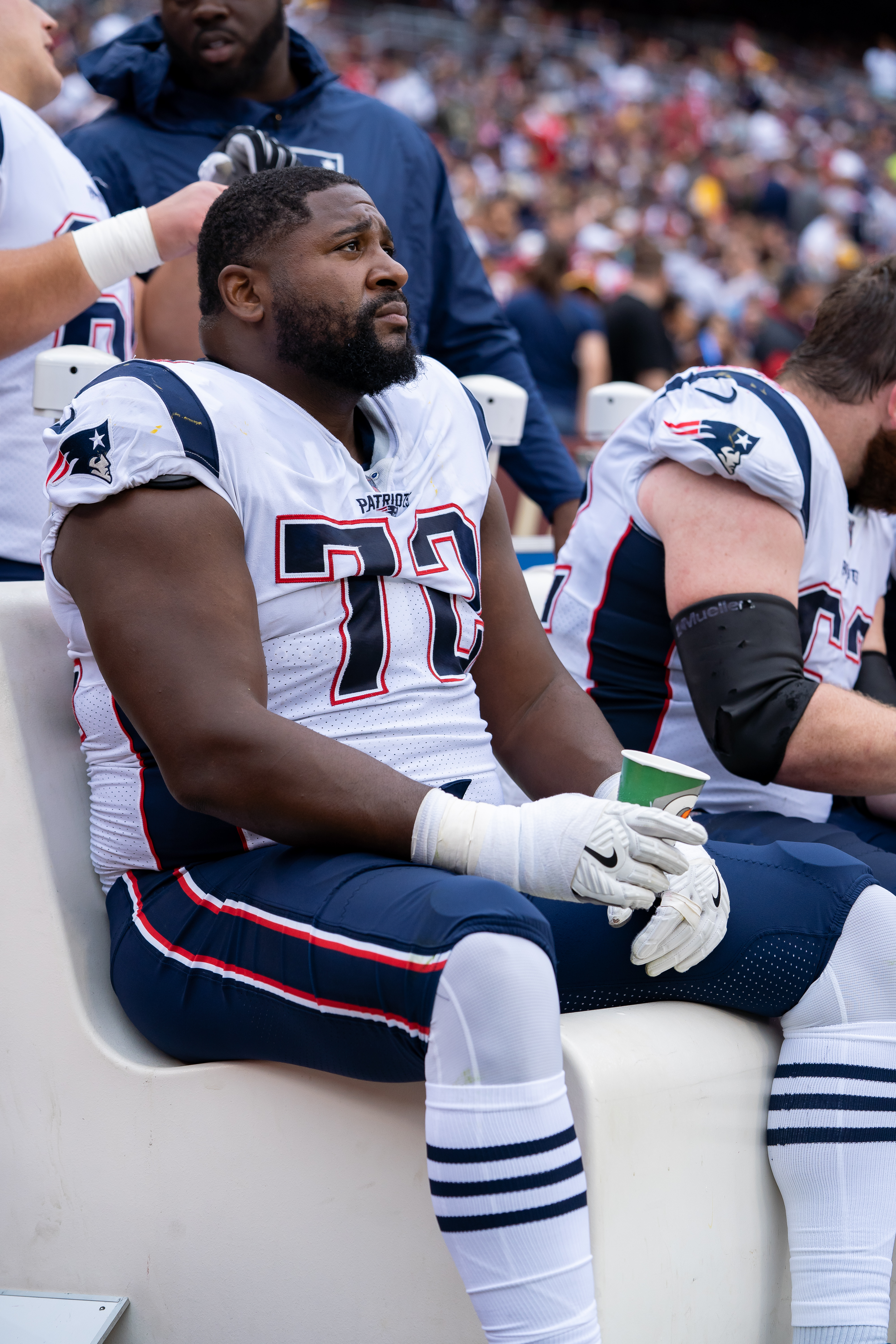
Newhouse with the Patriots in 2019

On September 11, 2019, Newhouse signed with the New England Patriots. He started nine games for the Patriots in 2019, one at right tackle and eight straight at left tackle.

=== Tennessee Titans ===
On November 27, 2020, Newhouse was signed to the Tennessee Titans practice squad. He was elevated to the active roster on December 5 for the team's week 13 game against the Cleveland Browns, and reverted to the practice squad after the game. He was signed to the active roster on December 11, 2020.

== Post-playing career ==
In 2026, Newhouse became a sideline analyst for CW College Football's Mountain West Conference coverage.
