= Nathan Hayes =

American football player

- Hayes with North Dakota State in 2026

No. 2 – North Dakota State Bison
- Position: Quarterback
- Class: Redshirt Senior

Personal information
- Listed height: 6 ft 3 in (1.91 m)
- Listed weight: 228 lb (103 kg)

Career information
- High school: St. Charles East (St. Charles, Illinois)
- College: North Dakota State (2022–present)

Awards and highlights
- FCS national champion (2024)
- Stats at ESPN

Nathan Hayes is an American football quarterback for the North Dakota State Bison.

== Early life ==
Hayes attended St. Charles East High School in St. Charles, Illinois, and committed to play college football for the North Dakota State Bison.

== College career ==
In his first season at NDSU, Hayes redshirted. In his second season, he appeared in three games. In 2024, he completed 12 of 19 pass attempts for 214 yards and three touchdowns. In the 2025 season, Hayes completed 25 of his 44 passes for 381 yards and four touchdowns. Heading into his senior season in 2026, he was named the team's starting quarterback.

=== Statistics ===
Year	Team	Games			Passing								Rushing			
Year	Team	GP	GS	Record	Cmp	Att	Pct	Yds	Y/A	TD	Int	Rtg	Att	Yds	Avg	TD
2022	North Dakota State	0	0	—	Redshirted (redshirt)											
2023	North Dakota State	3	0	—												
2024	North Dakota State	5	0	—	12	19	63.2	214	11.3	3	0	209.9	7	90	12.9	1
2025	North Dakota State	10	0	—	25	44	56.8	381	8.7	4	1	155.0	7	88	12.6	1
2026	North Dakota State	9	9	7–2	145	228	63.6	1,710	7.5	13	8	138.4	50	228	4.6	5
Career		27	9	7–2	182	291	62.5	2,305	7.9	20	9	145.6	64	406	6.3	7
