= CW College Football =

- Also known as: ACC on The CW; CW Football Saturday
- Presented by: Various commentators
- Country of origin: United States
- Original language: English
- No. of seasons: 4 (through 2026 season)

Production
- Camera setup: Multi-camera
- Running time: 210 minutes or until game ends (inc. adverts)
- Production companies: National Collegiate Athletic Association; CW Sports; Raycom Sports (ACC); Pac-12 Enterprises (Pac-12); GameTime Productions (Mountain West)

Original release
- Network: The CW
- Release: September 9, 2023 – present

Related
- CW Courtside Saturday; ACC on Regional Sports Networks

CW College Football is a presentation of NCAA Division I FBS college football broadcast by The CW.

The CW began carrying college football broadcasts on September 9, 2023, with a package of Atlantic Coast Conference (ACC) games sub-licensed from and produced by Raycom Sports (initially billed as the ACC on The CW), as well as coverage of the Arizona Bowl sub-licensed from Barstool Sports.

In 2024, CW Sports reached an agreement with the Pac-12—which, due to realignment, had been reduced to two teams for at least the 2024 and 2025 seasons—to broadcast most Oregon State University and Washington State University home games during the 2024 season. The games are produced by the Pac-12's media department, which CW Sports also subcontracted to produce studio programming. CW Sports also acquired the rights to the Arizona Bowl outright.

For 2026, CW Sports renewed its rights to Pac-12 (which would expand with additional teams), and added rights to the Mountain West Conference.

== History ==
ACC on The CW logo used during the 2023–24 season.

After Nexstar Media Group acquired a majority stake in The CW, the company began efforts to broaden the network's demographic reach to encompass older viewers within the key demographic and linear television viewership, citing preferences towards streaming platforms by younger viewers. This would include an increased focus on imported programs from other countries, and sports programming. The network began to establish a sports division in 2023, initially with the acquisition of U.S. rights to the LIV Golf League.

Raycom Sports has had a long-standing relationship with the Atlantic Coast Conference, having syndicated ACC basketball games, and later football, since 1982. Raycom maintained the rights to this package after ESPN acquired the conference's media rights in 2010. The broadcast television package ended after the 2018–19 season, when ESPN acquired its inventory for its new ACC Network cable channel.

As an aspect of this agreement, Raycom also held rights to syndicate a separate package of ACC telecasts to regional sports networks. In June 2023, Bally Sports—the package's primary rightsholder—announced that it would drop the ACC RSN package, amid the bankruptcy of parent company Diamond Sports Group. The following month, Raycom announced that it had sold the package to The CW, consisting of 13 football games, 28 men's basketball games, and 9 women's basketball games per-season. The CW aired its first ACC football broadcast on September 9, 2023, featuring Cincinnati at Pittsburgh.

On November 30, 2023, The CW reached an agreement with Barstool Sports to simulcast its coverage of the Arizona Bowl, which was previously exclusive to Barstool’s social media platforms since 2021.

CW Football Saturday logo used from 2024 to 2026.

On March 26, 2024, it was reported by sports columnist John Canzano that CW Sports was nearing an agreement with the Pac-12 Conference—whose membership had been reduced to Oregon State and Washington State as a result of realignment—to televise the two teams' home games during the 2024 season. The deal was officially announced on May 14, under which The CW would air 11 broadcasts between the two teams (the remaining two were aired by Fox Sports).

As part of the expansion, The CW also rebranded its coverage as CW Football Saturday, adding a new pre-game show hosted by Mike Yam, and former Fox Sports personality Thom Brennaman as lead commentator for ACC games and selected Pac-12 games. The Pac-12 games, as well as the new studio show, are being produced by the Pac-12's in-house media department Pac-12 Enterprises (which consists of the remainder of Pac-12 Network's staff). Both CW Football Saturday and the Pac-12 football broadcasts would feature a number of former Pac-12 Network personalities, including Yam and commentators such as Ted Robinson. On May 29, 2024, with Barstool ending its title sponsorship and broadcast rights to the bowl after 2023, CW Sports acquired rights to the 2024 Arizona Bowl.

In April 2025, The CW announced a one-year renewal of its agreement with the Pac-12, with plans to air nine Oregon State and Washington State home games in the 2025 season (the remaining four will be split between CBS and ESPN). The 2025 season introduced a new pre-game show, CW Football Saturday Countdown, hosted by Yam, Michael Bumpus, and George Wrighster. In August 2025, CW Sports reached a long term agreement with the Pac-12—which expanded to nine teams, consisting primarily of ex-Mountain West Conference members—to air 13 games per season from 2026 to 2030.

In February 2026, The CW reached an agreement with the Mountain West Conference to air 13 games per season from 2026 to 2030. In May, CW Sports renewed its agreement with the ACC and Raycom Sports through the 2030 season, expanding its football package from 13 to 14 games per-season. In July, CW Sports announced the broadcast crews for the 2026 season, with Miami Marlins radio announcer Jack McMullen, Cody Kessler, and Marshall Newhouse named the main broadcast crew for Mountain West games. In August, CW Sports acquired the rights to the Holiday Bowl and the revived Poinsettia Bowl starting that December.

== Production ==
With the limited turnaround time between the announcement and the start of the 2023 ACC football season, Raycom and The CW subcontracted resources from other broadcasters for its initial season of college football broadcasts, including ESPN (the conference's main rightsholder) temporarily allowing use of the ESPN College Football on-air graphics (pending the development of a dedicated CW Sports graphics package in time for basketball season), and its first game at Pitt sharing resources with Fox Sports (which was already at Acrisure Stadium for an NFL broadcast the following afternoon). Notably, the games were not initially available live on streaming-specific services like The CW app (replays of Pac 12 games are available on a next day on demand basis) but are available through streaming TV providers; in April 2026, The CW announced an agreement with ESPN to sub-license the digital rights to its sports output to ESPN Unlimited.

For the 2024 season, the production was rebranded as CW Football Saturday with a new on-air graphics package; Raycom continues to produce the ACC games under the new banner, while the Pac-12 portion of the package, as well as studio coverage, was produced from the new Pac-12 Studios in San Ramon, California (which had opened as a new facility for Pac-12 Network the previous season). Sister cable network NewsNation began to also be used as an overflow during doubleheaders. Studio production relocated to Goal Line Studios in Pleasanton, California in 2025, with the Pac-12 continuing its remote production role.

The TCU Horned Frogs' Iron Skillet rivalry game against the SMU Mustangs was televised as part of the CW's ACC package in 2024; the team promoted the game via a spoof of ESPN's "This Is SportsCenter" commercials entitled "one treefroghill" (referencing former The WB and CW series One Tree Hill), seemingly dissing the network by saying that the game was "unfortunately" on The CW. When SMU beat TCU in the game (its first victory in the rivalry since 2021), the ACC's X account quipped "'Thank goodness it was only on The CW' –TCU fans, probably."

With the 2026 coverage expansion, The CW's coverage was again rebranded as CW College Football (with the studio show now known as CW College Football Countdown) and will introduce a new on-air graphics package (inspired by elements of the on-air design of NASCAR on The CW). GameTime Productions was brought on to produce the Mountain West games, Pac-12 Enterprises will continue to produce the studio show and Pac-12 games, and Raycom Sports will continue to produce the ACC games.

== On-air talent ==
- Thom Brennaman (play-by-play)
- Rick Allen (play-by-play)
- Jack McMullen (alternate play-by-play)
- Chris Fisher (alternate play-by-play)
- Jason Cabinda (color)
- Will Blackmon (color)
- Cody Kessler (color)
- Isaiah Stanback (color)
- Wes Bryant (sideline reporter)
- Michael Bumpus (sideline reporter)
- Marshall Newhouse (sideline reporter)
- Bryan Walters (sideline reporter)
- Mike Yam (studio host)
- George Wrighster (studio analyst)
