= Chris Fisher (broadcaster) =

American sportscaster

- Education: University of Southern California
- Occupations: Radio and television broadcaster
- Sports commentary career
- Teams: USC Trojans; Oklahoma City Thunder (2018–present)
- Genre: Play-by-play
- Sports: Basketball; Football; Baseball
- Employer: Bally Sports Oklahoma

Chris Fisher is an American play-by-play sports commentator for the Oklahoma City Thunder of the National Basketball Association (NBA) on Bally Sports Oklahoma. He spent eight seasons serving as the radio voice for USC basketball before becoming the play-by-play announcer for the Thunder for the 2018–19 NBA season.

== Broadcasting career ==
Graduating from the University of Southern California, Fisher majored in political science while working in sportscasting. He served as the radio voice for USC women's basketball and was the host of the USC football broadcasts. After graduating, Fisher worked in broadcasting for minor league baseball teams, starting with the Potomac Nationals and then moving to the Eugene Emeralds. Fisher continued calling women's basketball games for USC before being named as the radio play-by-play announcer for the USC men's basketball team in 2010. Fisher's television work also included basketball play-by-play for FOX Sports, the Pac-12 Network, and for Time Warner Cable.

=== Oklahoma City Thunder (2018–present) ===
Prior to the start of the 2018–19 NBA season, Fisher was named as the Oklahoma City Thunder's newest TV play-by-play announcer after the Thunder parted ways with Brian Davis.

The incredible relationship between the Thunder and its fans is well recognized in professional sports. I am thankful the organization has put its faith in me and I look forward to continuing to promote this amazing partnership

— Chris Fisher

Fisher had his initial broadcast debut during a preseason game against the Atlanta Hawks on the Thunder's website and later made his professional TV debut in the regular season against the Los Angeles Clippers on October 19, 2018. During the 2021–22 season, Fisher missed nearly three weeks of broadcasting due to the NBA's COVID health and safety protocols. He later returned on February 5, 2022, on the Thunder's broadcast against the Sacramento Kings.

== Personal life ==
During his junior year at Cardinal Newman High School, Fisher was involved in a car accident where he was paralyzed in his legs. He was diagnosed with a broken neck and had injured his spinal cord near his vertebrae. He eventually recovered by doing physical therapy six days a week and rehabilitation.
