= 2026 Northern Illinois Huskies football team =

American college football season

2026 Northern Illinois Huskies football
- Conference: Mountain West Conference
- Record: 0–11 (0–7 MWC)
- Head coach: Rob Harley (interim; 1st season)
- Offensive coordinator: Quinn Sanders (2nd season)
- Co-offensive coordinator: Tony Petersen (1st season)
- Offensive scheme: Multiple
- Base defense: 4–2–5
- Home stadium: Huskie Stadium

2026 Mountain West Conference football standings
	Conf.			Overall
Team	W		L	W		L
New Mexico	6	–	1	9	–	2
North Dakota State	6	–	2	9	–	2
Wyoming	6	–	2	7	–	4
Air Force	5	–	2	9	–	2
UNLV	5	–	2	7	–	4
Nevada	4	–	3	5	–	6
San Jose State	3	–	5	5	–	7
Hawaii	2	–	6	3	–	8
UTEP	0	–	7	1	–	10
Northern Illinois	0	–	7	0	–	11
Championship: December 4, 2026
As of November 22, 2026; Rankings from CFP rankings

The 2026 Northern Illinois Huskies football team represents Northern Illinois University during the 2026 NCAA Division I FBS football season. The Huskies are led by Rob Harley, who was promoted from defensive coordinator to interim head coach following the departure of Thomas Hammock. The Huskies play home games at Huskie Stadium, located in DeKalb, Illinois. This is their first season competing in the Mountain West Conference (MWC) as a football only member.

== Offseason ==
=== Coaching changes ===
On February 18, 2026, head coach Thomas Hammock resigned from his position at NIU to join the Seattle Seahawks as the running backs coach and senior offensive assistant, returning to the NFL after a 7-year stint with the Huskies with a 35-47 record, despite signing a contract extension in 2025 that was set to last through the 2029 season. NIU athletic director Sean Frazier promoted defensive coordinator Rob Harley to interim head coach for the 2026 season.

=== Conference changes ===
Amidst the 2021-2026 NCAA conference realignment, Northern Illinois announced it would be moving its football program to the Mountain West Conference (MW) on January 7, 2025, ending their 29-year run in the Mid-American Conference (MAC) as full members. NIU's gymnastics team later followed as an affiliate member while moving their wrestling team to the PAC-12. The rest of their Olympic sports teams moved to the Horizon League, with all of the moves becoming effective on July 1, 2026.

== Preseason ==
=== Transfers ===
Northern Illinois picked up quarterback Taron "Tyger" Dickens from the transfer portal on July 3, 2026. Dickens originally spent three seasons at FCS Western Carolina. In the 2025 season Dickens threw for 3,508 yards, for a 74% completion rate, 38 touchdowns, and two interceptions. Dickens finished in second place for the Walter Peyton award, given to the best offensive player in the FCS. Dickens initially committed to UNC on February 17, 2026, but reentered the portal on May 29, reportedly due to academic reasons.

== Schedule ==
Date	Time	Opponent	Site	TV	Result	Attendance
September 5	3:15 p.m.	at No. 22 Iowa*	Kinnick Stadium; Iowa City, IA	BTN	L 0–40	69,250
September 12	6:00 p.m.	No. 5 (FCS) Illinois State*	Huskie Stadium; DeKalb, IL	MW+	L 24–28	17,582
September 19	9:30 p.m.	at Arizona*	Casino Del Sol Stadium; Tucson, AZ	TNT/TruTV	L 17–42	40,413
September 26	1:00 p.m.	at Georgia State*	Center Parc Stadium; Atlanta, GA	ESPN+	L 14–35	16,608
October 10	6:30 p.m.	Air Force	Huskie Stadium; DeKalb, IL	CBSSN	L 7–28	15,292
October 17	3:30 p.m.	at Wyoming	War Memorial Stadium; Laramie, WY	The CW	L 23–41	20,065
October 24	2:30 p.m.	Hawai'i	Huskie Stadium; DeKalb, IL	MW+	L 21–56	7,650
October 31	9:30 p.m.	at UNLV	Allegiant Stadium; Las Vegas, NV	CBSSN	L 24–31	22,382
November 7	3:00 p.m.	at San Jose State	CEFCU Stadium; San Jose, CA	MW+	L 19–30	9,786
November 14	2:30 p.m.	Nevada	Huskie Stadium; DeKalb, IL	MW+	L 7–28	6,354
November 21	3:00 p.m.	at North Dakota State	Fargodome; Fargo, ND	The CW	L 25–31	18,111
November 28	2:30 p.m.	UTEP	Huskie Stadium; DeKalb, IL	MW+		
*Non-conference game; Rankings from AP Poll and CFP Rankings released prior to game; All times are in Central time

== Personnel ==
=== Roster ===
2026 Northern Illinois Huskies football team roster
Players			Coaches
Offense: Pos. / # / Name / Class	Defense: Pos. / # / Name / Class	Special teams: Pos. / # / Name / Class	Head coach: Rob Harley; Coordinators/assistant coaches Legend: (C) Team captain; (S) Suspended; (I) Ineligible; Injured; Redshirt; Roster

=== Coaching staff ===
Name	Position	Season
Rob Harley	Head Coach	1st
Quinn Sanders	Offensive Coordinator/Quarterbacks	2nd
Tony Petersen	co–Offensive Coordinator/Quarterback	1st
Ty Boles	Assistant Coach/Running Backs	2nd
Matt White	Assistant Coach / Offensive Line	1st
Joseph Hawkins	Assistant Coach/Wide Receivers	5th
Brayden Patton	Assistant Coach/Tight Ends	2nd
Justin Robinson	Assistant Coach/Defensive Tackles	2nd
Chris West	Assistant Coach/Defensive Ends	1st
Cory Connolly	Special Teams Coordinator/Linebackers	2nd
DJ Bland	Assistant Coach/Cornerbacks/Pass Defense Coordinator	4th
Kai Ross	Assistant Coach/Safeties	2nd

== Game summaries ==
=== at No. 22 Iowa ===
Northern Illinois Huskies (0–0) at No. 22 Iowa Hawkeyes (0–0) – Game summary

Quarter	1	2	3	4	Total
Huskies	0	0	0	0	0
No. 22 Hawkeyes	20	13	7	0	40

at Kinnick Stadium • Iowa City, Iowa

- Date: September 5
- Game time: 3:15 p.m. (CDT)
- Game weather: 90 °F (32 °C), Cloudy, Wind NE 9 mph (14 km/h)
- Game attendance: 69,250
- Referee: Kole Knueppel
- TV announcers (BTN): Mark Followill, Rhett Lewis, and Caroline Hendershot

Game information

First quarter

- 9:52 IOWA – Tony Diaz 6-yard pass from Hank Brown (Caden Buhr kick failed) (Drive: 10 plays, 75 yards, 5:08; Iowa 6–0)
- 6:46 IOWA – Kamari Moulton 50-yard run (Caden Buhr kick) (Drive: 2 plays, 66 yards, 0:42; Iowa 13–0)
- 4:10 IOWA – Kamari Moulton 37-yard run (Caden Buhr kick) (Drive: 4 plays, 70 yards, 1:48; Iowa 20–0)

Second quarter

- 7:40 IOWA – Xavier Williams 8-yard pass from Jeremy Hecklinski (Caden Buhr kick) (Drive: 6 plays, 46 yards, 3:20; Iowa 27–0)
- 3:34 IOWA – Caden Buhr 45-yard field goal (Drive: 6 plays, 31 yards, 2:10; Iowa 30–0)
- 0:02 IOWA – Caden Buhr 34-yard field goal (Drive: 14 plays, 41 yards, 2:17; Iowa 33–0)

Third quarter

- 2:20 IOWA - Evan James 77-yard punt return (Caden Buhr kick) Iowa 40–0

Fourth quarter

- No scoring plays.

Statistics	NIU	IOWA
First downs	7	26
Plays–yards	55–120	78–507
Rushes–yards	31–7	38–289
Passing yards	113	218
Passing: comp–att–int	13–24–1	21–40–1
Turnovers	2	1
Time of possession	26:09	33:51

Team	Category	Player	Statistics
Northern Illinois	Passing	Taron Dickens	9/14, 96 yards, INT
Northern Illinois	Rushing	Telly Johnson Jr.	8 carries, 16 yards
Northern Illinois	Receiving	Kelan McInerney	3 receptions, 55 yards
Iowa	Passing	Hank Brown	12/20, 129 yards, TD
Iowa	Rushing	Kamari Moulton	11 carries, 183 yards, 2 TD
Iowa	Receiving	Tony Diaz	7 receptions, 84 yards, TD

=== No. 5 (FCS) Illinois State ===
No. 5 (FCS) Illinois State Redbirds (2–0) at Northern Illinois Huskies (0–1) – Game summary

Quarter	1	2	3	4	Total
No. 5 (FCS) Redbirds	14	7	0	7	28
Huskies	0	17	0	7	24

at Huskie Stadium, DeKalb, Illinois

- Date: September 12
- Game time: 6:00 p.m. (CDT)
- Game weather: Sunny • Temperature: 78 °F (26 °C) • Wind: NE at 11 miles per hour (18 km/h)
- Game attendance: 17,582
- Referee: Marcus Thornton
- TV: MW+

Game information

First quarter

- ILST – Jack Oliver 39-yard interception return (Michael Cosentino kick), 12:41. Redbirds 7–0.
- ILST – Chase Kwiatkowski 14-yard run (Michael Cosentino kick), 6:27. Redbirds 14–0. Drive: 9 plays, 57 yards, 4:56.

Second quarter

- ILST – Dylan Lord 6-yard pass from Gage Roy (Michael Cosentino kick), 14:52. Redbirds 21–0. Drive: 10 plays, 60 yards, 4:10.
- NIU – Andruw Ellis 30-yard interception return (JJ Schlenhardt kick), 12:39. Redbirds 21–7.
- NIU – JJ Schlenhardt 40-yard field goal, 6:32. Redbirds 21–10. Drive: 9 plays, 38 yards, 4:40.
- NIU – DeAree Rogers 2-yard pass from Taron Dickens (JJ Schlenhardt kick), 0:00. Redbirds 21–17. Drive: 13 plays, 65 yards, 3:03.

Third quarter

- No scoring plays.

Fourth quarter

- NIU – Telly Johnson Jr. 1-yard run (JJ Schlenhardt kick), 7:24. Huskies 24–21. Drive: 8 plays, 78 yards, 4:13.
- ILST – Alex Herrera 16-yard pass from Gage Roy (Michael Cosentino kick), 1:53. Redbirds 28–24. Drive: 11 plays, 75 yards, 5:31.

Statistics	ILST	NIU
First downs	19	20
Plays–yards	63–254	66–308
Rushes–yards	36–101	36–112
Passing yards	153	196
Passing: comp–att–int	21–27–2	23–30–2
Turnovers	2	2
Time of possession	31:16	28:44

Team	Category	Player	Statistics
Illinois State	Passing	Gage Roy	20/23, 146 yards, 2 TD
Illinois State	Rushing	Victor Dawson	12 carries, 46 yards
Illinois State	Receiving	Dylan Lord	8 receptions, 62 yards, TD
Northern Illinois	Passing	Taron Dickens	22/27, 193 yards, TD, INT
Northern Illinois	Rushing	Telly Johnson Jr.	22 carries, 83 yards, TD
Northern Illinois	Receiving	DeAree Rogers	11 receptions, 74 yards, TD

=== at Arizona ===
Northern Illinois Huskies (0–2) at Arizona Wildcats (1–1) – Game summary

Quarter	1	2	3	4	Total
Huskies	10	0	0	7	17
Wildcats	7	21	7	7	42

at Casino Del Sol Stadium • Tucson, AZ

- Date: September 19
- Game time: 7:30 p.m. (PDT)
- Game weather: Sunny, 84 °F (29 °C)
- Game attendance: 40,413
- Referee: Michael McCabe
- TV announcers (TNT): J.B. Long, Mike Golic Jr. and Coy Wire

Game information

First quarter

- (11:24) NIU – JJ Schlenhardt 38-yard field goal (Drive: 10 plays, 54 yards, 3:36; Northern Illinois 3–0)
- (9:07) NIU – Cam Thompson 52-yard pass from Taron Dickens, JJ Schlenhardt kick (Drive: 1 play, 52 yards, 0:09; Northern Illinois 10–0)
- (6:01) ARIZ – Chris Hunter 38-yard pass from Noah Fifita, Michael Salgado-Medina kick (Drive: 7 plays, 86 yards, 3:01; Northern Illinois 10–7)

Second quarter

- (11:13) ARIZ – Isaiah Mizell 14-yard pass from Noah Fifita, Michael Salgado-Medina kick (Drive: 13 plays, 76 yards, 4:55; Arizona 14–10)
- (3:54) ARIZ – Tre Spivey 10-yard pass from Noah Fifita, Michael Salgado-Medina kick (Drive: 7 plays, 80 yards, 3:08; Arizona 21–10)
- (2:13) ARIZ – Caleb Smith 69-yard punt return, Michael Salgado-Medina kick (Arizona 28–10)

Third quarter

- (9:01) ARIZ – Tyler Powell 3-yard pass from Noah Fifita, Michael Salgado-Medina kick (Drive: 13 plays, 75 yards, 5:59; Arizona 35–10)

Fourth quarter

- (7:54) ARIZ – Noah Fifita 30-yard run, Michael Salgado-Medina kick (Drive: 11 plays, 80 yards, 7:48; Arizona 42–10)
- (0:13) NIU – Elijah Porter 1-yard run, JJ Schlenhardt kick (Drive: 9 plays, 48 yards, 3:20; Arizona 42–17)

Statistics	NIU	ARIZ
First downs	20	22
Plays–yards	67–341	64–441
Rushes–yards	24–86	27–84
Passing yards	255	357
Passing: Comp–Att–Int	29–43–0	32–37–1
Turnovers	0	1
Time of possession	29:40	30:20

Team	Category	Player	Statistics
Northern Illinois	Passing	Taron Dickens	25/37, 228 yards, TD
Northern Illinois	Rushing	Telly Johnson Jr.	12 carries, 69 yards
Northern Illinois	Receiving	DeAree Rogers	10 receptions, 68 yards
Arizona	Passing	Noah Fifita	31/34, 325 yards, 4 TD
Arizona	Rushing	Kedrick Reescano	8 carries, 30 yards
Arizona	Receiving	Tre Spivey	6 receptions, 90 yards, TD

=== at Georgia State ===
Northern Illinois Huskies (0–3) at Georgia State Panthers (2–1) – Game summary

Quarter	1	2	3	4	Total
Huskies	7	7	0	0	14
Panthers	7	14	14	0	35

at Center Parc Stadium • Atlanta, Georgia

- Date: September 26
- Game time: 2:00 p.m. (EDT)
- Game weather: Sunny
- Game attendance: 16,608
- Referee: Marty Adams
- TV announcers (ESPN+): Matt Steward (play-by-play), Sam Crenshaw (analyst)

Game information

First quarter

- GAST - Avion McBride 5-yard pass from Cameran Brown (Samer Layous kick), 14:00. Panthers 7-0. Drive: 2 plays, 4 yards, 0:48.
- NIU - Telly Johnson Jr. 14-yard run (JJ Schlenhardt kick), 1:58. Tied 7-7. Drive: 11 plays, 84 yards, 5:15.

Second quarter

- GAST - Rodshaun Dorsey 18-yard pass from Cameran Brown (Samer Layous kick), 13:55. Panthers 14-7. Drive: 8 plays, 75 yards, 3:03.
- NIU - DeAree Rogers 22-yard pass from Taron Dickens (JJ Schlenhardt kick), 12:21. Tied 14-14. Drive: 4 plays, 75 yards, 1:34.
- GAST - Isaiah Stone 100-yard kickoff return (Samer Layous kick), 12:08. Panthers 21-14.

Third quarter

- GAST - Lanear McCrary Jr. 1-yard run (Samer Layous kick), 6:25. Panthers 28-14. Drive: 9 plays, 69 yards, 4:51.
- GAST - Rodshaun Dorsey 50-yard pass from DJ Riles (Samer Layous kick), 1:25. Panthers 35-14. Drive: 5 plays, 80 yards, 2:15.

Statistics	NIU	GAST
First downs	24	17
Plays–yards	73-432	57-342
Rushes–yards	31-112	35-144
Passing yards	320	198
Passing: Comp–Att–Int	28-42-0	15-22-1
Turnovers	2	2
Time of possession	33:11	26:49

Team	Category	Player	Statistics
Northern Illinois	Passing	Taron Dickens	28/42, 320 yards, TD
Northern Illinois	Rushing	Telly Johnson Jr.	15 carries, 91 yards, TD
Northern Illinois	Receiving	DeAree Rogers	9 receptions, 107 yards, TD
Georgia State	Passing	Cameran Brown	14/21, 148 yards, 2 TDs, INT
Georgia State	Rushing	Lanear McCrary Jr.	21 carries, 112 yards, TD
Georgia State	Receiving	Rodshaun Dorsey	5 receptions, 114 yards, 2 TDs

=== Air Force ===
Air Force Falcons (3–1) at Northern Illinois Huskies (0–4) – Game summary

Quarter	1	2	3	4	Total
Falcons	7	7	14	0	28
Huskies	0	7	0	0	7

at Huskie Stadium • DeKalb, Illinois

- Date: October 10
- Game time: 6:30 p.m. (CDT)
- Game weather: Sunny • Temperature: 72 °F (22 °C) • Wind: N at 12 miles per hour (19 km/h)
- Game attendance: 15,292
- Referee: Christian Watson
- TV announcers (CBSSN): Jordan Kent (play-by-play), Robert Turbin (analyst)

Game information

First quarter

- AFA - Owen Allen 3 Yd Run (Carter Cremascoli Kick), 4:48. Air Force 7-0. Drive: 15 plays, 83 yards, 8:02

Second quarter

- NIU - Telly Johnson Jr. 9 Yd Run (JJ Schlenhardt Kick), 7:58. Tied 7-7. Drive: 7 plays, 71 yards, 3:47
- AFA - Evan Medders 4 Yd Run (Carter Cremascoli Kick), 0:41. Air Force 14-7. Drive: 13 plays, 75 yards, 7:17

Third quarter

- AFA - Owen Allen 33 Yd Run (Carter Cremascoli Kick), 10:28. Air Force 21-7. Drive: 8 plays, 75 yards, 4:31
- Evan Medders 41 Yd Run (Carter Cremascoli Kick), 7:23. Air Force 28-7. Drive: 3 plays, 55 yards, 1:16

Statistics	AFA	NIU
First downs	26	13
Plays–yards	68-439	43-253
Rushes–yards	67-439	23-113
Passing yards	0	140
Passing: Comp–Att–Int	0-1-0	13-20-1
Turnovers	0	1
Time of possession	39:09	20:51

Team	Category	Player	Statistics
Air Force	Passing	Kemper Hodges	0/1, 0 yards
Air Force	Rushing	Evan Medders	16 carries, 114 yards, 2 TDs
Air Force	Receiving	None	N/A
Northern Illinois	Passing	Taron Dickens	13/20, 140 yards, INT
Northern Illinois	Rushing	Telly Johnson Jr.	8 carries, 47 yards, TD
Northern Illinois	Receiving	DeAree Rogers	7 receptions, 81 yards

=== at Wyoming ===
Northern Illinois Huskies (0–5) at Wyoming Cowboys (3–3) – Game summary

Quarter	1	2	3	4	Total
Huskies	0	6	11	6	23
Cowboys	10	10	7	14	41

at War Memorial Stadium • Laramie, Wyoming

- Date: October 17
- Game time: 2:30 p.m. (MDT)
- Game weather: Sunny • Temperature: 66 °F (19 °C) • Wind: SW at 12 miles per hour (19 km/h)
- Game attendance: 20,065
- Referee: Patrick Foy
- TV announcers (The CW): Jack McMullen (play-by-play), Cody Kessler (analyst), Marshall Newhouse (analyst)

Game information

First quarter

- WYO - Erik Sandvik 37 Yd Field Goal, 9:20. Wyoming 3-0. Drive: 10 plays, 56 yards, 5:40
- WYO - Tyler Hughes 53 Yd Run (Erik Sandvik Kick), 5:39. Wyoming 10-0 Drive: 4 plays, 82 yards, 1:55

Second quarter

- NIU - JJ Schlenhardt 44 Yd Field Goal, 11:33. Wyoming 10-3. Drive: 12 plays, 54 yards, 4:5
- WYO - Tyler Hughes 24 Yd Run (Erik Sandvik Kick), 9:35. Wyoming 17-3. Drive: 4 plays, 75 yards, 1:58
- NIU - JJ Schlenhardt 22 Yd Field Goal, 2:41. Wyoming 17-6. Drive: 16 plays, 70 yards, 6:54
- WYO - Erik Sandvik 24 Yd Field Goal, 0:00. Wyoming 20-6. Drive: 3 plays, 45 yards, 0:30

Third quarter

- NIU - JJ Schlenhardt 46 Yd Field Goal, 12:58. Wyoming 20-9. Drive: 7 plays, 46 yards, 2:02
- WYO - Tyler Hughes 6 Yd Run (Erik Sandvik Kick), 10:25. Wyoming 27-9. Drive: 5 plays, 75 yards, 2:33
- NIU - Telly Johnson Jr. 13 Yd Run (George Dimopoulos Run for Two-Point Conversion), 3:58. Wyoming 27-17. Drive: 14 plays, 75 yards, 6:27

Fourth quarter

- WYO - Tyler Hughes 11 Yd Run (Erik Sandvik Kick), 14:54. Wyoming 34-17. Drive: 8 plays, 75 yards, 4:04
- WYO - Landon Sims 11 Yd Run (Erik Sandvik Kick), 6:48. Wyoming 41-17. Drive: 12 plays, 76 yards, 6:38
- NIU - La'Don Bryant 34 Yd pass from Taron Dickens (Two-Point Pass Conversion Failed), 3:53. Wyoming 41-23. Drive: 8 plays, 75 yards, 2:55

Statistics	NIU	WYO
First downs	21	25
Plays–yards	73-392	60-510
Rushes–yards	29-176	41-314
Passing yards	216	196
Passing: Comp–Att–Int	24-44-0	16-19-0
Turnovers	0	0
Time of possession	29:55	30:05

Team	Category	Player	Statistics
Northern Illinois	Passing	Taron Dickens	24/44, 216 yards, TD
Northern Illinois	Rushing	Telly Johnson Jr.	16 carries, 139 yards, TD
Northern Illinois	Receiving	DeAree Rogers	11 receptions, 89 yards
Wyoming	Passing	Tyler Hughes	16/19, 196 yards
Wyoming	Rushing	Tyler Hughes	12 carries, 183 yards, 4 TDs
Wyoming	Receiving	Eric Richardson	5 receptions, 77 yards

=== Hawaii ===
Hawaii Rainbow Warriors (1–6) at Northern Illinois Huskies (0–6) – Game summary

Quarter	1	2	3	4	Total
Rainbow Warriors	14	21	14	7	56
Huskies	7	7	0	7	21

at Huskie Stadium • DeKalb, Illinois

- Date: October 24
- Game time: 2:30 p.m. (CDT)
- Game weather: Sunny
- Game attendance: 7,650
- Referee: Kenneth Ray
- TV announcers (MW+): Matt Rodewald (play-by-play), Clay Harbor (analyst)

Game information

First quarter

- HAW - DeVon Rice 2 Yd Run (Sean Olvera-Harle Kick), 9:13, Hawaii 7-0. Drive: 12 plays, 75 yards, 5:47
- NIU - DeAree Rogers 49 Yd pass from Taron Dickens (JJ Schlenhardt Kick), 6:49, Tied 7-7. Drive: 5 plays, 77 yards, 2:17
- HAW - Frank Abreu 13 Yd pass from Micah Alejado (Sean Olvera-Harle Kick), 3:43. Hawaii 14-7. Drive: 6 plays, 75 yards, 3:06

Second quarter

- NIU - DeAree Rogers 25 Yd pass from Taron Dickens (JJ Schlenhardt Kick), 13:46. Tied 14-14. Drive: 4 plays, 39 yards, 1:55
- HAW - DeVon Rice 33 Yd Run (Sean Olvera-Harle Kick), 11:17. Hawaii 21-14. Drive: 5 plays, 75 yards, 2:29
- HAW - Cam Barfield 1 Yd Run (Sean Olvera-Harle Kick), 5:27. Hawaii 28-14. Drive: 10 plays, 93 yards, 4:29
- HAW - Frank Abreu 12 Yd pass from Micah Alejado (Sean Olvera-Harle Kick), 0:23. Hawaii 35-14. Drive: 5 plays, 67 yards, 1:45

Third quarter

- HAW - DeVon Rice 5 Yd Run (Sean Olvera-Harle Kick), 7:51. Hawaii 42-14. Drive: 5 plays, 35 yards, 2:36
- HAW - Josiah Fetui 44 Yd pass from Micah Alejado (Sean Olvera-Harle Kick), 1:12. Hawaii 49-14. Drive: 11 plays, 80 yards, 5:40

Fourth quarter

- NIU - Elijah Porter 3 Yd Run (JJ Schlenhardt Kick), 8:55. Hawaii 49-21. Drive: 8 plays, 51 yards, 4:11
- HAW - TJ Fo'ilefutu 6 Yd Run (Sean Olvera-Harle Kick), 3:16. Hawaii 56-21. Drive: 5 plays, 18 yards, 3:00

Statistics	HAW	NIU
First downs	24	14
Plays–yards	76-504	50-266
Rushes–yards	42-175	24-95
Passing yards	329	171
Passing: comp–att–int	23-34-1	17-26-2
Turnovers	1	5
Time of possession	37:44	22:16

Team	Category	Player	Statistics
Hawaii	Passing	Micah Alejado	22/32, 323 yards, 3 TDs, INT
Hawaii	Rushing	DeVon Rice	12 carries, 71 yards, 3 TDs
Hawaii	Receiving	Audric Harris	2 receptions, 90 yards
Northern Illinois	Passing	Taron Dickens	17/26, 171 yards, 2 TDs, 2 INTs
Northern Illinois	Rushing	Telly Johnson Jr.	14 carries, 63 yards
Northern Illinois	Receiving	DeAree Rogers	8 receptions, 115 yards, 2 TDs

=== at UNLV ===
Northern Illinois Huskies (0–7) at UNLV Rebels (4–3) – Game summary

Quarter	1	2	3	4	Total
Huskies	14	3	7	0	24
Rebels	10	14	7	0	31

at Allegiant Stadium • Paradise, Nevada

- Date: October 31
- Game time: 7:30 p.m. (PDT)
- Game weather: N/A (indoor stadium)
- Game attendance: 22,382
- Referee: Cal McNeill
- TV announcers (CBSSN): Jordan Kent (play-by-play), Doug Pederson (analyst)

Game information

First Quarter

- UNLV - Kayden McGee 75 Yd pass from Jackson Arnold (Ramon Villela Kick), 14:49. UNLV 7-0. Drive: 1 play, 75 yards, 0:11
- NIU - Telly Johnson Jr. 20 Yd Run (JJ Schlenhardt Kick), 9:57. Tied 7-7. Drive: 10 plays, 75 yards, 4:52
- UNLV - Ramon Villela 20 Yd Field Goal, 4:34. UNLV 10-7. Drive: 12 plays, 73 yards, 5:18
- NIU - DeAree Rogers 12 Yd pass from Taron Dickens (JJ Schlenhardt Kick), 0:53. NIU 14-10. Drive: 7 plays, 75 yards, 3:41

Second Quarter

- NIU - JJ Schlenhardt 27 Yd Field Goal, 10:15. NIU 17-10. Drive: 10 plays, 32 yards, 4:32
- UNLV - Keyan Burnett 31 Yd pass from Jackson Arnold (Ramon Villela Kick), 7:04. Tied 17-17. Drive: 7 plays, 75 yards, 3:11
- UNLV - Taeshaun Lyons 2 Yd pass from Jackson Arnold (Ramon Villela Kick), 0:20. UNLV 24-17. Drive: 11 plays, 71 yards, 2:31

Third Quarter

- UNLV - Jai'Den Thomas 60 Yd Run (Ramon Villela Kick), 11:18. UNLV 31-17. Drive: 4 plays, 89 yards, 1:20
- NIU - George Dimopoulos 61 Yd pass from Taron Dickens (JJ Schlenhardt Kick), 9:31. UNLV 31-24. Drive: 5 plays, 75 yards, 1:47

Statistics	NIU	UNLV
First downs	24	22
Plays–yards	75-493	62-473
Rushes–yards	38-240	32-204
Passing yards	253	269
Passing: comp–att–int	19-37-1	20-30-2
Time of possession	35:09	24:51

Team	Category	Player	Statistics
Northern Illinois	Passing	Taron Dickens	19/37, 253 yards, 2 TDs, INT
Northern Illinois	Rushing	Elijah Porter	21 carries, 113 yards
Northern Illinois	Receiving	George Dimopoulos	7 receptions, 127 yards, TD
UNLV	Passing	Jackson Arnold	20/30, 269 yards,, 3 TDs, 2 INTs
UNLV	Rushing	Jai'Den Thomas	16 carries, 114 yards, TD
UNLV	Receiving	Kayden McGee	5 receptions, 112 yards, TD

=== at San Jose State ===
Northern Illinois Huskies (0–8) at San Jose State Spartans (4–5) – Game summary

Quarter	1	2	3	4	Total
Huskies	0	13	0	6	19
Spartans	10	6	14	0	30

at CEFCU Stadium • San Jose, California

- Date: November 7
- Game time: 1:00 PM (PST)
- Game weather: Sunny • Temperature: 75 °F (24 °C) • Wind: SE at 6 miles per hour (9.7 km/h)
- Game attendance: 9,786
- Referee: Kenneth Ray
- TV announcers (MW+): Neal Ruhl (play-by-play), David Fales (analyst)

Game information

First quarter

- SJSU - Viliami Teu 5 Yd Run (Trajan Sinatra Kick), 9:43. SJSU 7-0. Drive: 9 plays, 59 yards, 4:30
- SJSU - Trajan Sinatra 25 Yd Field Goal, 2:06. SJSU 10-0. Drive: 9 plays, 74 yards, 4:41

Second quarter

- SJSU - Trajan Sinatra 46 Yd Field Goal, 11:46. SJSU 13-0. Drive: 8 plays, 29 yards, 3:53
- NIU - Telly Johnson Jr. 4 Yd Run (Ryan Short PAT failed), 8:07. SJSU 13-6. Drive: 7 plays, 81 yards, 3:36
- NIU - Zaire McKinney 19 Yd pass from Taron Dickens (Ryan Short Kick), 3:25. Tied 13-13. Drive: 8 plays, 81 yards, 3:33
- SJSU - Trajan Sinatra 22 Yd Field Goal, 1:37. SJSU 16-13. Drive: 8 plays, 70 yards, 1:48

Third quarter

- SJSU - Viliami Teu 1 Yd Run (Trajan Sinatra Kick), 9:32. SJSU 23-13. Drive: 7 plays, 18 yards, 4:12
- SJSU - Dominique McKenzie 29 Yd pass from Daniel Rolovich (Trajan Sinatra Kick), 6:09. SJSU 30-13. Drive: 1 play, 29 yards, 0:09

Fourth quarter

- NIU - Taron Dickens 1 Yd Run (Two-Point Pass Conversion Failed), 3:55. SJSU 30-19. Drive: 10 plays, 85 yards, 3:52

Statistics	NIU	SJSU
First downs	24	14
Plays–yards	74-400	60-316
Rushes–yards	38-141	33-85
Passing yards	259	231
Passing: comp–att–int	26-36-1	16-27-0
Turnovers	2	0
Time of possession	31:46	28:14

Team	Category	Player	Statistics
Northern Illinois	Passing	Taron Dickens	26/36, 259 yards, TD, INT
Northern Illinois	Rushing	Elijah Porter	12 carries, 79 yards
Northern Illinois	Receiving	DeAree Rogers	6 receptions, 86 yards
San Jose State	Passing	Daniel Rolovich	16/27, 231 yards, TD
San Jose State	Rushing	Viliami Teu	17 carries, 42 yards, 2 TDs
San Jose State	Receiving	Dominique McKenzie	2 receptions, 71 yards, TD

=== Nevada ===
Nevada Wolf Pack (3–6) at Northern Illinois Huskies (0–9) – Game summary

Quarter	1	2	3	4	Total
Wolf Pack	0	0	0	0	0
Huskies	0	0	0	0	0

at Huskie Stadium • DeKalb, Illinois

- Date: November 14
- Game time: 2:30 p.m.

Game information

First quarter
Second quarter
Third quarter
Fourth quarter

Statistics	NEV	NIU
First downs		
Plays–yards		
Rushes–yards		
Passing yards		
Passing: comp–att–int		
Turnovers		
Time of possession		

Team	Category	Player	Statistics
Nevada	Passing		
Nevada	Rushing		
Nevada	Receiving		
Northern Illinois	Passing		
Northern Illinois	Rushing		
Northern Illinois	Receiving		

=== at North Dakota State ===
Northern Illinois Huskies (0–10) at North Dakota State Bison (8–2) – Game summary

Quarter	1	2	3	4	Total
Huskies	0	0	0	0	0
Bison	0	0	0	0	0

at Fargodome • Fargo, North Dakota

- Date: November 21
- Game time: 3:00 p.m.

Game information

First quarter
Second quarter
Third quarter
Fourth quarter

Statistics	NIU	NDSU
First downs		
Plays–yards		
Rushes–yards		
Passing yards		
Passing: comp–att–int		
Turnovers		
Time of possession		

Team	Category	Player	Statistics
Northern Illinois	Passing		
Northern Illinois	Rushing		
Northern Illinois	Receiving		
North Dakota State	Passing		
North Dakota State	Rushing		
North Dakota State	Receiving		

=== UTEP ===
UTEP Miners (0–0) at Northern Illinois Huskies (0–0) – Game summary

Quarter	1	2	3	4	Total
Miners	0	0	0	0	0
Huskies	0	0	0	0	0

at Huskie Stadium • DeKalb, Illinois

- Date: November 28
- Game time: 2:30 p.m.

Game information

First quarter
Second quarter
Third quarter
Fourth quarter

Statistics	UTEP	NIU
First downs		
Plays–yards		
Rushes–yards		
Passing yards		
Passing: Comp–Att–Int		
Turnovers		
Time of possession		

Team	Category	Player	Statistics
UTEP	Passing		
UTEP	Rushing		
UTEP	Receiving		
Northern Illinois	Passing		
Northern Illinois	Rushing		
Northern Illinois	Receiving		
