= 2026 West Virginia Mountaineers football team =

American college football season

2026 West Virginia Mountaineers football
- Conference: Big 12 Conference
- Record: 5–6 (2–6 Big 12)
- Head coach: Rich Rodriguez (9th season)
- Offensive scheme: Spread option
- Defensive coordinator: Zac Alley (2nd season)
- Base defense: Multiple 4–2–5
- Home stadium: Milan Puskar Stadium

2026 Big 12 Conference football standings
	Conf.			Overall
Team	W		L	W		L
No. 2 Utah	7	–	0	10	–	0
No. 12 Texas Tech	6	–	1	9	–	1
No. 10 BYU	6	–	2	9	–	2
No. 20 Houston	5	–	3	8	–	3
No. 19 Arizona	4	–	3	7	–	3
Oklahoma State	4	–	3	6	–	4
Arizona State	4	–	3	6	–	4
Baylor	4	–	3	6	–	4
UCF	4	–	4	6	–	5
TCU	3	–	4	5	–	5
Iowa State	3	–	5	5	–	6
Cincinnati	3	–	5	6	–	5
West Virginia	2	–	6	5	–	6
Colorado	2	–	6	4	–	7
Kansas	2	–	6	4	–	7
Kansas State	1	–	6	4	–	6
Championship: December 4, 2026
^ – College Football Playoff participant; $ – Conference champion; y – Championship game participant; As of November 21, 2026; Rankings from CFP rankings

The 2026 West Virginia Mountaineers football team is who represents West Virginia University as they are a member of the Big 12 Conference during the 2026 NCAA Division I FBS football season. The Mountaineers are led by ninth-year head coach Rich Rodriguez in the second year of his second stint at the school. The Mountaineers play their home games at Milan Puskar Stadium in Morgantown, West Virginia.

== Schedule ==
Date	Time	Opponent	Site	TV	Result	Attendance
September 5	12:00 p.m.	Coastal Carolina*	Milan Puskar Stadium; Morgantown, WV	TNT/TruTV	W 31–24	54,158
September 12	1:00 p.m.	UT Martin*	Milan Puskar Stadium; Morgantown, WV	ESPN+	W 52–7	47,049
September 19	7:30 p.m.	vs. No. 25 Virginia*	Bank of America Stadium; Charlotte, NC (Duke's Mayo Classic)	ACCN	W 38–27	39,377
September 26	7:00 p.m.	Oklahoma State	Milan Puskar Stadium; Morgantown, WV	FS1	L 24–41	57,756
October 3	12:00 p.m.	at Iowa State	Jack Trice Stadium; Ames, IA	TNT/TruTV	L 42–45	52,724
October 10	12:00 p.m.	Arizona	Milan Puskar Stadium; Morgantown, WV	TNT	L 31–52	50,121
October 17	12:00 p.m.	Cincinnati^{†}	Milan Puskar Stadium; Morgantown, WV (rivalry)	TNT/TruTV	W 45–42	48,106
October 24	12:00 p.m.	at TCU	Amon G. Carter Stadium; Fort Worth, TX	ESPN2	W 24–20	36,216
November 7	9:30 p.m.	at No. 15 Texas Tech	Galaxy Stadium; Lubbock, TX	ESPN	L 48–53	60,229
November 14	5:30 p.m.	Kansas	Milan Puskar Stadium; Morgantown, WV	ESPNU	L 14–37	45,629
November 21	1:00 p.m.	No. 20 Houston	Milan Puskar Stadium; Morgantown, WV	TNT/TruTV	L 31–34	37,380
November 27	9:00 p.m.	at Utah	Rice–Eccles Stadium; Salt Lake City, UT	FOX	–	
*Non-conference game; ^{†}Homecoming; Rankings from AP Poll (and CFP Rankings, after November 3) – Released prior to game; All times are in Eastern time

== Game summaries ==
=== vs Coastal Carolina ===
Coastal Carolina Chanticleers (0–0) at West Virginia Mountaineers (0–0) – Game summary

Quarter	1	2	3	4	Total
Chanticleers	0	0	7	17	24
Mountaineers	14	10	0	7	31

at Milan Puskar Stadium • Morgantown, West Virginia

- Date: September 5
- Game time: 12:00 p.m. EDT
- Game weather: 72 °F (22 °C) • cloudy
- Game attendance: 54,158
- Referee: Luke Richmond
- TV announcers (TNT/truTV): J.B. Long, Mike Golic Jr. and Coy Wire
- WVU Scoring Summary report, Big 12 Conference Game Highlights

Game information

First quarter

- WVU – Cam Cook 3-yard run (Jack Cassidy kick), 14:13. Mountaineers 7–0. Drive: 2 plays, 75 yards, 0:47.
- WVU – Armoni Weaver-Bomar 49-yard pass from Michael Hawkins Jr. (Jack Cassidy kick), 2:14. Mountaineers 14–0. Drive: 9 plays, 92 yards, 3:33.

Second quarter

- WVU – Jack Cassidy 38-yard field goal, 13:51. Mountaineers 17–0. Drive: 7 plays, 21 yards, 2:22.
- WVU – Cam Cook 1-yard run (Jack Cassidy kick), 1:18. Mountaineers 24–0. Drive: 17 plays, 86 yards, 6:35.

Third quarter

- CCU – Clayton Coppock Jr. 34-yard pass from Deuce Bailey (Nico Cavanillas Alti kick), 3:57. Mountaineers 24–7. Drive: 12 plays, 99 yards, 7:13.

Fourth quarter

- CCU – Colton Hinton 13-yard pass from Deuce Bailey (Nico Cavanillas Alti kick), 12:56. Mountaineers 24–14. Drive: 3 plays, 71 yards, 0:33.
- WVU – Michael Hawkins Jr. 11-yard run (Jack Cassidy kick), 2:58. Mountaineers 31–14. Drive: 5 plays, 75 yards, 3:00.
- CCU – Clayton Coppock Jr. 37-yard pass from Deuce Bailey (Nico Cavanillas Alti kick), 1:51. Mountaineers 31–21. Drive: 5 plays, 35 yards, 1:07.
- CCU – Nico Cavanillas Alti 32-yard field goal, 0:27. Mountaineers 31–24. Drive: 6 plays, 65 yards, 1:07.

Statistics	CCU	WVU
First downs	22	18
Plays–yards	64–425	75–413
Rushes–yards	27–52	61–281
Passing yards	373	132
Passing: comp–att–int	21–37–0	11–14–0
Turnovers	2	1
Time of possession	27:04	32:56

Team	Category	Player	Statistics
Coastal Carolina	Passing	Deuce Bailey	21/37, 373 yards, 3 TD
Coastal Carolina	Rushing	Jevon Edwards	10 carries, 20 yards
Coastal Carolina	Receiving	Clayton Coppock Jr.	4 receptions, 83 yards, 2 TD
West Virginia	Passing	Michael Hawkins Jr.	11/14, 132 yards, TD
West Virginia	Rushing	Cam Cook	30 carries, 142 yards, 2 TD
West Virginia	Receiving	Armoni Weaver-Bomar	1 reception, 49 yards, TD

=== vs UT Martin (FCS) ===
UT Martin Skyhawks (FCS) (1–1) at West Virginia Mountaineers (1–0) – Game summary

Quarter	1	2	3	4	Total
Skyhawks (FCS)	0	0	0	7	7
Mountaineers	21	7	17	7	52

at Milan Puskar Stadium • Morgantown, West Virginia

- Date: September 12
- Game time: 1:00 p.m.
- Game weather: 85 °F (29.4 °C) • sunny • wind: South 7mph
- Game attendance: 47,049
- Referee: Tutashinda Salaam
- TV announcers (ESPN+): Shawn Kenney and Jeff Woody
- WVU Scoring Summary report, Big 12 Conference Game Highlights

Game information

First quarter

- WVU – DJ Epps 53-yard pass from Michael Hawkins Jr. (Jack Cassidy kick), 12:08. Mountaineers 7–0. Drive: 3 plays, 53 yards, 0:59.
- WVU – Cam Cook 2-yard run (Jack Cassidy kick), 9:11. Mountaineers 14–0. Drive: 5 plays, 21 yards, 1:33.
- WVU – Michael Hawkins Jr. 71-yard run (Jack Cassidy kick), 5:27. Mountaineers 21–0. Drive: 4 plays, 95 yards, 1:24.

Second quarter

- WVU – Michael Hawkins Jr. 5-yard run (Jack Cassidy kick), 11:30. Mountaineers 28–0. Drive: 5 plays, 74 yards, 1:44.

Third quarter

- WVU – Ryan Ward 32-yard pass from Michael Hawkins Jr. (Jack Cassidy kick), 12:57. Mountaineers 35–0. Drive: 6 plays, 75 yards, 2:03.
- WVU – Amari Latimer 29-yard run (Jack Cassidy kick), 9:56. Mountaineers 42–0. Drive: 2 plays, 47 yards, 0:33.
- WVU – Jack Cassidy 35-yard field goal, 1:35. Mountaineers 45–0. Drive: 15 plays, 73 yards, 6:21.

Fourth quarter

- WVU – Kedrick Triplett 27-yard pass from Jyron Hughley (Nate Flower kick), 7:07. Mountaineers 52–0. Drive: 10 plays, 68 yards, 4:13.
- UTM – John Betts III 6-yard fumble return (Brandon Sims kick), 3:25. Mountaineers 52–7.

Statistics	UTM	WVU
First downs	18	23
Plays–yards	70–318	63–525
Rushes–yards	37–148	51–316
Passing yards	170	209
Passing: comp–att–int	22–33–1	8–12–0
Turnovers	2	1
Time of possession	34:44	25:16

Team	Category	Player	Statistics
UT Martin	Passing	Tate Surber	19/28, 137 yards, INT
UT Martin	Rushing	Chris Franklin	12 carries, 85 yards
UT Martin	Receiving	Kaleb Costner	3 receptions, 36 yards
West Virginia	Passing	Michael Hawkins Jr.	5/7, 155 yards, 2 TD
West Virginia	Rushing	Michael Hawkins Jr.	6 carries, 96 yards, 2 TD
West Virginia	Receiving	DJ Epps	2 receptions, 112 yards, TD

=== vs. No. 25 Virginia ===
West Virginia Mountaineers (2–0) vs. No. 25 Virginia Cavaliers (2–0) – Game summary

Quarter	1	2	3	4	Total
Mountaineers	7	14	7	10	38
No. 25 Cavaliers	14	0	7	6	27

at Bank of America Stadium • Charlotte, North Carolina

- Date: September 19
- Game time: 7:30 p.m.
- Game weather: 82 °F (27.8 °C) • sunny • wind: West 5 mph
- Game attendance: 39,377
- Referee: Steven Robinson
- TV announcers (ACCN): Wes Durham, Max Browne, and Madison Fitzpatrick
- WVU Scoring Summary report, Big 12 Conference Game Highlights

Statistics	WVU	UVA
First downs	21	18
Plays–yards	68–437	70–354
Rushes–yards	51–247	37–157
Passing yards	190	197
Passing: comp–att–int	10–17–0	21–33–0
Time of possession	26:53	33:07

Team	Category	Player	Statistics
West Virginia	Passing	Michael Hawkins Jr.	10/17, 190 yards, 2 TD
West Virginia	Rushing	Michael Hawkins Jr.	18 carries, 123 yards, 3 TD
West Virginia	Receiving	DJ Epps	3 receptions, 92 yards, 2 TD
Virginia	Passing	Beau Pribula	21/33, 197 yards, 2 TD
Virginia	Rushing	Jekail Middlebrook	17 carries, 75 yards, TD
Virginia	Receiving	Xay Davis	3 receptions, 51 yards

=== vs Oklahoma State ===
Oklahoma State Cowboys (2–1) at West Virginia Mountaineers (3–0) – Game summary

Quarter	1	2	3	4	Total
Cowboys	3	10	15	13	41
Mountaineers	7	7	10	0	24

at Milan Puskar Stadium • Morgantown, West Virginia

- Date: September 26
- Game time: 7:00 p.m. EDT
- Game weather: 66 °F (18.9 °C) • clear
- Game attendance: 57,756
- Referee: Kevin Mar
- TV announcers (FS1): Eric Collins and Spencer Tillman
- WVU Scoring Summary report, Big 12 Conference Condensed Game

Statistics	OKST	WVU
First downs	25	29
Plays–yards	68–609	88–467
Rushes–yards	41–220	66–335
Passing yards	389	132
Passing: comp–att–int	20–27–1	10–22–1
Time of possession	28:56	31:04

Team	Category	Player	Statistics
Oklahoma State	Passing	Drew Mestemaker	20/27/1, 389 yards, 3 TD
Oklahoma State	Rushing	Caleb Hawkins	31 carries, 180 yards, TD
Oklahoma State	Receiving	Wyatt Young	8 receptions, 192 yards, TD
West Virginia	Passing	Michael Hawkins Jr.	10/22/1, 132 yards
West Virginia	Rushing	Cam Cook	29 carries, 193 yards
West Virginia	Receiving	DJ Epps	2 receptions, 39 yards

=== at Iowa State ===
West Virginia Mountaineers (3–1) at Iowa State Cyclones (2–2) – Game summary

Quarter	1	2	3	4	Total
Mountaineers	7	7	14	14	42
Cyclones	7	14	7	17	45

at Jack Trice Stadium • Ames, Iowa

- Date: October 3
- Game time: 11:00 p.m. CDT
- Game weather: 64 °F (17.8 °C) • clear • South 14 mph
- Game attendance: 52,724
- Referee: Michael VanderVelde
- TV announcers (TNT/TruTV): J. B. Long, Mike Golic Jr., and Jared Greenberg
- WVU Scoring Summary report, Big 12 Conference Condensed Game

Statistics	WVU	ISU
First downs	19	29
Plays–yards	63–518	76–577
Rushes–yards	40–291	47–265
Passing yards	227	312
Passing: comp–att–int	11–23–0	21–29–1
Time of possession	21:46	38:14

Team	Category	Player	Statistics
West Virginia	Passing	Michael Hawkins Jr.	11/23/0, 227 yards, 2 TD
West Virginia	Rushing	Michael Hawkins Jr.	20 carries, 149 yards, 2 TD
West Virginia	Receiving	DJ Epps	4 receptions, 114 yards, TD
Iowa State	Passing	Jaylen Raynor	19/27/1, 264 yards, TD
Iowa State	Rushing	Aiden Flora	22 carries, 212 yards, 3 TD
Iowa State	Receiving	Cody Jackson	6 receptions, 160 yards, TD

=== vs Arizona ===
Arizona Wildcats (4–1) at West Virginia Mountaineers (3–2) – Game summary

Quarter	1	2	3	4	Total
Wildcats	14	10	14	14	52
Mountaineers	3	14	7	7	31

at Milan Puskar Stadium • Morgantown, West Virginia

- Date: October 10
- Game time: 12:00 p.m.
- Game weather: 65 °F (18.3 °C) • cloudy • South East 7 mph
- Game attendance: 50,121
- Referee: Stephen Baron
- TV announcers (TNT/TruTV): J. B. Long (play-by-play), Mike Golic Jr. (analyst), and Allie LaForce (sideline)
- WVU Scoring Summary report, Big 12 Conference Extended Highlights

Game information

First quarter

- (10:12) WVU – Jack Cassidy 23-yard field goal (Drive: 13 plays, 58 yards, 4:48; West Virginia 3–0)
- (5:40) ARIZ – Isaiah Mizell 14-yard pass from Noah Fifita, Michael Salgado-Medina kick (Drive: 11 plays, 75 yards, 4:37; Arizona 7–3)
- (5:12) ARIZ – Lee Molette III 32-yard fumble return, Michael Salgado-Medina kick (Arizona 14–3)

Second quarter

- (13:02) WVU – Michael Hawkins Jr. 3-yard run, Jack Cassidy kick (Drive: 1 play, 3 yards, 0:04; Arizona 14–10)
- (10:02) ARIZ – Michael Salgado-Medina 44-yard field goal (Drive: 9 plays, 48 yards, 3:01; Arizona 17–10)
- (7:47) WVU – Cam Cook 30-yard run, Jack Cassidy kick (Drive: 8 plays, 75 yards, 2:18; Tied 17–17)
- (2:58) ARIZ – Quincy Craig 40-yard run, Michael Salgado-Medina kick (Drive: 4 plays, 58 yards, 1:24; Arizona 24–17)

Third quarter

- (13:51) ARIZ – Kedrick Reescano 8-yard run, Michael Salgado-Medina kick (Drive: 4 plays, 75 yards, 1:13; Arizona 31–17)
- (1:30) WVU – Amari Latimer 2-yard run, Jack Cassidy kick (Drive: 16 plays, 92 yards, 6:40; Arizona 31–24)
- (0:21) ARIZ – Isaiah Mizell 72-yard pass from Noah Fifita, Michael Salgado-Medina kick (Drive: 4 plays, 75 yards, 1:15; Arizona 38–24)

Fourth quarter

- (12:33) WVU – Cam Cook 1-yard run, Jack Cassidy kick (Drive: 9 plays, 75 yards, 2:40; Arizona 38–31)
- (11:43) ARIZ – Brandon Phelps 42-yard pass from Noah Fifita, Michael Salgado-Medina kick (Drive: 2 plays, 75 yards, 0:58; Arizona 45–31)
- (9:45) ARIZ – Antwan Roberts Jr. 30-yard run, Michael Salgado-Medina kick (Drive: 2 plays, 52 yards, 0:49; Arizona 52–31)

Statistics	ARIZ	WVU
First downs	20	30
Plays–yards	51–482	104–522
Rushes–yards	27–141	76–303
Passing yards	341	219
Passing: comp–att–int	17–24–1	11–28–0
Time of possession	24:10	35:50

Team	Category	Player	Statistics
Arizona	Passing	Noah Fifita	16/23/1, 341 yards, 3 TD
Arizona	Rushing	Kedrick Reescano	11 carries, 44 yards, TD
Arizona	Receiving	Isaiah Mizell	6 receptions, 183 yards, 2 TD
West Virginia	Passing	Michael Hawkins Jr.	11/28/0, 219 yards
West Virginia	Rushing	Cam Cook	34 carries, 141 yards, 2 TD
West Virginia	Receiving	Prince Strachan	5 receptions, 121 yards

=== vs Cincinnati ===
Cincinnati Bearcats (4–1) at West Virginia Mountaineers (3–3) – Game summary

Quarter	1	2	3	4	Total
Bearcats	7	14	7	14	42
Mountaineers	0	14	7	24	45

at Milan Puskar Stadium • Morgantown, West Virginia

- Date: October 17
- Game time: 12:00 p.m.
- Game weather: Cloudy • Temperature: 48 °F (9 °C) • Wind: S 12 mph
- Game attendance: 48,106
- Referee: Michael McCabe
- TV announcers (TNT/TruTV): J. B. Long (play-by-play), Mike Golic Jr. (analyst), and Jared Greenberg (sideline)

Game information

First quarter

- (8:53) CIN – JV Gibson 4-yard pass from JC French IV, Stephen Rusnak kick (Drive: 13 plays, 75 yards, 6:07; Cincinnati 7–0)

Second quarter

- (11:56) WVU – Michael Hawkins Jr. 12-yard run, Jack Cassidy kick (Drive: 10 plays, 81 yards, 3:56; Tied 7–7)
- (4:55) CIN – Isaiah Johnson 51-yard pass from JC French IV, Stephen Rusnak kick (Drive: 5 plays, 77 yards, 2:00; Cincinnati 14–7)
- (2:19) WVU – Michael Hawkins Jr. 2-yard run, Jack Cassidy kick (Drive: 7 plays, 78 yards, 2:31; Tied 14–14)
- (1:22) CIN – Cole Tabb 28-yard run, Stephen Rusnak kick (Drive: 4 plays, 75 yards, 0:57; Cincinnati 21–14)

Third quarter

- (12:32) WVU – Josh Sapp 4-yard pass from Michael Hawkins Jr., Jack Cassidy kick (Drive: 7 plays, 75 yards, 2:28; Tied 21–21)
- (1:34) CIN – JC French IV 1-yard run, Stephen Rusnak kick (Drive: 13 plays, 78 yards, 6:44; Cincinnati 28–21)

Fourth quarter

- (14:51) WVU – DJ Epps 37-yard pass from Michael Hawkins Jr., Jack Cassidy kick (Drive: 6 plays, 75 yards, 1:43; Tied 28–28)
- (11:23) CIN – Cole Tabb 11-yard pass from JC French IV, Stephen Rusnak kick (Drive: 8 plays, 65 yards, 3:28; Cincinnati 35–28)
- (7:29) WVU – Amari Latimer 3-yard run, Jack Cassidy kick (Drive: 9 plays, 75 yards, 3:54; Tied 35–35)
- (5:35) CIN – Cole Tabb 6-yard run, Stephen Rusnak kick (Drive: 5 plays, 75 yards, 1:54; Cincinnati 42–35)
- (3:44) WVU – Cam Cook 40-yard pass from Michael Hawkins Jr., Jack Cassidy kick (Drive: 5 plays, 75 yards, 1:51; Tied 42–42)
- (0:00) WVU – Jack Cassidy 35-yard field goal (Drive: 8 plays, 82 yards, 2:05; West Virginia 45–42)

Statistics	CIN	WVU
First downs	28	27
Plays–yards	70–622	79–598
Rushes–yards	40–233	46–134
Passing yards	389	464
Passing: comp–att–int	22–30–0	25–33–0
Time of possession	31:56	28:04

Team	Category	Player	Statistics
Cincinnati	Passing	JC French IV	22/30, 389 yards, 3 TD
Cincinnati	Rushing	Cole Tabb	15 carries, 118 yards, 2 TD
Cincinnati	Receiving	Malachi Henry	2 receptions, 128 yards
West Virginia	Passing	Michael Hawkins Jr.	25/33, 464 yards, 3 TD
West Virginia	Rushing	Michael Hawkins Jr.	26 carries, 104 yards, 2 TD
West Virginia	Receiving	DJ Epps	8 receptions, 163 yards, TD

=== at TCU ===
West Virginia Mountaineers (4–3) at TCU Horned Frogs (3–3) – Game summary

Quarter	1	2	3	4	Total
Mountaineers	3	7	7	7	24
Horned Frogs	7	3	10	0	20

at Amon G. Carter Stadium • Fort Worth, Texas

- Date: October 24
- Game time: 12:00 p.m.
- Game attendance: 36,216
- TV announcers (ESPN2): Chuckie Kempf (play by play), Dustin Fox (anaylst), and Laura Stickells (sideline)

Statistics	WVU	TCU
First downs	17	29
Plays–yards	58–265	82–484
Rushes–yards	43–186	35–112
Passing yards	79	372
Passing: comp–att–int	7–15–1	33–47–1
Time of possession	22:24	37:36

Team	Category	Player	Statistics
West Virginia	Passing	Michael Hawkins Jr.	7/15, 79 yards, TD, INT
West Virginia	Rushing	Cam Cook	18 carries, 94 yards
West Virginia	Receiving	Prince Strachan	2 receptions, 24 yards
TCU	Passing	Jaden Craig	33/47, 372 yards, TD, INT
TCU	Rushing	Jon Denman	15 carries, 62 yards
TCU	Receiving	Kari Ashley	6 receptions, 118 yards

=== at No. 15 Texas Tech ===
West Virginia Mountaineers (5–3) at No. 15 Texas Tech Red Raiders (7–1) – Game summary

Quarter	1	2	3	4	Total
Mountaineers	17	10	21	0	48
No. 15 Red Raiders	14	27	0	12	53

at Galaxy Stadium, Lubbock, Texas

- Date: November 7
- Game time: 9:30 p.m. EST
- Game attendance: 60,229
- Referee: Luke Richmond
- TV announcers (ESPN): Jay Alter, Tom Luginbill, and Sherree Burress

Game information
First quarter
- TTU – Terrance Carter Jr. 30-yard pass from Tommy Castellanos (Stone Harrington kick), 13:02. Red Raiders 7–0. Drive: 5 plays, 65 yards, 1:58.
- WVU – Amari Latimer 3-yard run (Jack Cassidy kick), 9:26. Tied 7–7. Drive: 8 plays, 75 yards, 3:36.
- WVU – Jack Cassidy 30-yard field goal, 4:39. Mountaineers 10–7. Drive: 7 plays, 71 yards, 3:01.
- TTU – J'Koby Williams 75-yard run (Stone Harrington kick), 4:26. Red Raiders 14–10. Drive: 1 play, 75 yards, 0:13.
- WVU – Michael Hawkins Jr. 3-yard run (Jack Cassidy kick), 0:58. Mountaineers 17–14. Drive: 9 plays, 75 yards, 3:29.

Second quarter

- TTU – Terrance Carter Jr. 29-yard pass from Tommy Castellanos (Stone Harrington kick), 13:37. Red Raiders 21–17. Drive: 7 plays, 75 yards, 2:21.
- WVU – Taron Francis 73-yard pass from Michael Hawkins Jr. (Jack Cassidy kick), 13:06. Mountaineers 24–21. Drive: 2 plays, 75 yards, 0:31.
- TTU – Jett Carpenter 1-yard pass from Tommy Castellanos (Stone Harrington kick), 9:28. Red Raiders 28–24. Drive: 8 plays, 75 yards, 3:38.
- TTU – Kenny Johnson 38-yard pass from Tommy Castellanos (Stone Harrington kick), 7:31. Red Raiders 35–24. Drive: 2 plays, 81 yards, 0:30.
- WVU – Jack Cassidy 29-yard field goal, 2:19. Red Raiders 35–27. Drive: 11 plays, 65 yards, 5:12.
- TTU – Quinten Joyner 1-yard run (run failed), 1:13. Red Raiders 41–27. Drive: 6 plays, 75 yards, 1:06.

Third quarter

- WVU – Michael Hawkins Jr. 2-yard run (Jack Cassidy kick), 11:15. Red Raiders 41–34. Drive: 9 plays, 75 yards, 3:45.
- WVU – Cam Cook 2-yard run (Jack Cassidy kick), 3:50. Tied 41–41. Drive: 4 plays, 84 yards, 1:42.
- WVU – Michael Hawkins Jr. 3-yard run (Jack Cassidy kick), 1:12. Mountaineers 48–41. Drive: 3 plays, 6 yards, 1:08.

Fourth quarter

- TTU – Stone Harrington 46-yard field goal, 7:55. Mountaineers 48–44. Drive: 15 plays, 69 yards, 5:45.
- TTU – Kenny Johnson 5-yard pass from Tommy Castellanos (Stone Harrington kick), 2:44. Red Raiders 51–48. Drive: 9 plays, 69 yards, 3:41.
- TTU – Michael Hawkins Jr. sacked in the end zone by Trey White for a safety, 1:24. Red Raiders 53–48.

Statistics	WVU	TTU
First downs	18	26
Total yards	582	638
Rushing yards	279	276
Passing yards	303	362
Turnovers	0	0
Time of possession	29:45	30:15

Team	Category	Player	Statistics
West Virginia	Passing	Michael Hawkins Jr.	11/16, 303 yards, TD
West Virginia	Rushing	Cam Cook	23 rushes, 149 yards, TD
West Virginia	Receiving	Taron Francis	3 receptions, 169 yards, TD
Texas Tech	Passing	Tommy Castellanos	18/27, 362 yards, 5 TD
Texas Tech	Rushing	J'Koby Williams	19 rushes, 160 yards, 2 TD
Texas Tech	Receiving	Kenny Johnson	5 receptions, 84 yards, 2 TD

=== vs Kansas ===
Kansas Jayhawks (3–6) at West Virginia Mountaineers (5–4) – Game summary

Quarter	1	2	3	4	Total
Jayhawks	17	13	0	7	37
Mountaineers	7	0	0	7	14

at Milan Puskar Stadium • Morgantown, West Virginia

- Date: November 14
- Game time: 5:30 p.m.
- Game weather: Cloudy
- Game attendance: 45,629
- TV announcers (ESPNU): Chris Sylvester and Henry Burris

Statistics	KU	WVU
First downs	21	15
Plays–yards	73–448	71–262
Rushes–yards	55–296	37–35
Passing yards	152	227
Passing: comp–att–int	15–18–1	19–34–1
Time of possession	36:44	23:16

Team	Category	Player	Statistics
Kansas	Passing	Isaiah Marshall	15/18, 152 yards, INT
Kansas	Rushing	Isaiah Marshall	19 carries, 164 yards, TD
Kansas	Receiving	Nik McMillan	6 receptions, 44 yards
West Virginia	Passing	Michael Hawkins Jr.	19/34, 227 yards, TD, INT
West Virginia	Rushing	Michael Hawkins Jr.	25 carries, 36 yards, TD
West Virginia	Receiving	DJ Epps	5 receptions, 51 yards

=== vs No. 20 Houston ===
No. 20 Houston Cougars (7–3) at West Virginia Mountaineers (5–5) – Game summary

Quarter	1	2	Total
No. 20 Cougars			0
Mountaineers			0

at Milan Puskar Stadium • Morgantown, West Virginia

- Date: November 21
- Game time: 1:00 p.m.
- TV announcers (TNT/TruTV): J. B. Long, Mike Golic Jr., and Allie LaForce

Statistics	HOU	WVU
First downs		
Plays–yards		
Rushes–yards		
Passing yards		
Passing: comp–att–int		
Time of possession		

Team	Category	Player	Statistics
Houston	Passing		
Houston	Rushing		
Houston	Receiving		
West Virginia	Passing		
West Virginia	Rushing		
West Virginia	Receiving		

=== at Utah ===
West Virginia Mountaineers (0–0) at Utah Utes (0–0) – Game summary

Quarter	1	2	Total
Mountaineers			0
Utes			0

at Rice–Eccles Stadium • Salt Lake City, Utah

- Date: November 27
- Game time: TBD
- TV: Fox

Statistics	WVU	UTAH
First downs		
Plays–yards		
Rushes–yards		
Passing yards		
Passing: comp–att–int		
Time of possession		

Team	Category	Player	Statistics
West Virginia	Passing		
West Virginia	Rushing		
West Virginia	Receiving		
Utah	Passing		
Utah	Rushing		
Utah	Receiving		

== Roster ==
2026 West Virginia Mountaineers football team roster
Players
Coaches
Offense

Pos.	#	Name	Class
TE	0	Josh Sapp	Sr
FB	33	Kayden Luke	Jr
OL	51	Raymond Kovalesky	So
OL	52	Nick Krahe	Jr
OL	54	Amare Grayson	Jr
OL	55	Aidan Woods	Fr
OL	56	Lamarcus Dillard	Fr
OL	59	Josh Aisosa	So
OL	60	Jonas Muya	Fr
OL	61	Trevor Bigelow	Fr
OL	64	Rhett Morris	Fr
OL	65	Malik Agbo	Sr
OL	67	Landen Livingston	Sr
OL	68	Camden Goforth	Fr
OL	69	Devin Vass	Jr
OL	72	Cam Griffin	Sr
OL	73	Andreas Hunter	So
OL	74	Kevin Brown	Fr
OL	76	Deshawn Woods	Sr
OL	78	Wes King	Sr
OL	79	Carsten Casady	Jr

Defense

Pos.	#	Name	Class
S	0	Andrew Powdrell	Sr

Special teams

Pos.	#	Name	Class
LS	38	Macguire Moss	Sr

Head coach

- Rich Rodriguez

Coordinators/assistant coaches

- Zac Alley – Assistant head coach / defensive coordinator / linebackers
- Pat Kirkland – Special teams coordinator / defensive assistant coach
- Travis Trickett – Senior offensive assistant
- Rick Trickett – Offensive line coach
- Deke Adams – Defensive ends coach
- Jay Boulware – Running backs coach
- Logan Bradley – Inside receivers coach
- Gabe Franklin – Safeties coach
- Ryan Garrett – Wide receivers coach
- William Green – Defensive line coach
- Michael Nysewander – Tight ends coach
- Rhett Rodriguez – Quarterbacks coach
- Rod West – Cornerbacks coach
- Derek Dressler – Assistant offensive line coach
- Andrew Warwick – Linebackers coach
- Henry Weinreich – Nickels/sams coach
- Pat White – Assistant quarterbacks coach / assistant to the head coach
- Mike Joseph – Assistant athletics director / head coach for strength and conditioning
- Parker Whiteman – Assistant head strength coach / director of skill development for football

Legend

- (C) Team captain
- (S) Suspended
- (I) Ineligible
- Injured
- Redshirt

Roster
Last update: 11/10/2026
