= 2026 Arizona Wildcats football team =

American college football season

2026 Arizona Wildcats football
- Conference: Big 12 Conference

Ranking
- Coaches: No. 20
- AP: No. 19
- CFP: No. 19
- Record: 8–3 (5–3 Big 12)
- Head coach: Brent Brennan (3rd season)
- Offensive coordinator: Seth Doege (2nd season)
- Offensive scheme: Spread
- Defensive coordinator: Danny Gonzales (2nd season)
- Base defense: 3–3–5
- Home stadium: Casino Del Sol Stadium

Uniform

2026 Big 12 Conference football standings
	Conf.			Overall
Team	W		L	W		L
No. 2 Utah y	8	–	0	11	–	0
No. 12 Texas Tech	7	–	1	10	–	1
No. 10 BYU	6	–	2	9	–	2
No. 19 Arizona	5	–	3	8	–	3
No. 20 Houston	5	–	3	8	–	3
Oklahoma State	5	–	3	7	–	4
Baylor	4	–	4	6	–	5
Arizona State	4	–	4	6	–	5
UCF	4	–	4	6	–	5
Iowa State	3	–	5	5	–	6
TCU	3	–	5	5	–	6
Cincinnati	3	–	5	6	–	5
Kansas	2	–	6	4	–	7
West Virginia	2	–	6	5	–	6
Colorado	2	–	6	4	–	7
Kansas State	1	–	7	4	–	7
Championship: TBD vs. Utah
^ – College Football Playoff participant; $ – Conference champion; y – Championship game participant; As of November 22, 2026; Rankings from CFP rankings

The 2026 Arizona Wildcats football team represents the University of Arizona in the Big 12 Conference during the 2026 NCAA Division I FBS football season. Arizona is led by third-year head coach Brent Brennan. They play their home games at Casino Del Sol Stadium, located in Tucson, Arizona. This is the Wildcats' 127th season overall, and their third year in the Big 12.

== Offseason ==
Positions key
Offense	Defense	Special teams
QB — Quarterback; RB — Running back; FB — Fullback; WR — Wide receiver; TE — Tight end; OL — Offensive lineman; T — Tackle; G — Guard; C — Center	DL — Defensive lineman; DT — Defensive tackle (Note: Includes nose tackle (NT)); DE — Defensive end; EDGE — Edge rusher; LB — Linebacker (Note: Includes middle linebacker (MLB/MIKE), weakside linebacker (WILL), strongside linebacker (SAM), off-ball linebacker, and outside linebacker (OLB)); DB — Defensive back; CB — Cornerback; S — Safety (Note: Includes free safety (FS) and strong safety (SS))	K — Kicker (Note: Also known as a placekicker (PK)); P — Punter; LS — Long snapper; RS — Return specialist (Note: Includes kickoff and punt returners)

=== Entered NFL draft ===
The deadline for players to declare for the NFL draft is January 14, 2026.

Player	Position	Round	Pick	Drafted by
Treydan Stukes	CB	2	38	Las Vegas Raiders
Genesis Smith	CB	4	131	Los Angeles Chargers
Dalton Johnson	CB	5	150	Las Vegas Raiders
Michael Dansby	CB	7	255	Seattle Seahawks

=== Total picks by school ===
Team	Round 1	Round 2	Round 3	Round 4	Round 5	Round 6	Round 7	Total
Arizona	0	1	0	1	1	0	1	4

=== Departures ===
Over the course of the off-season, Arizona lost 43 total players. 21 players in transfer portal, 14 players graduated, 8 players declared for the 2026 NFL draft.

2026 Arizona Offseason departures
Name	Pos.	Height	Weight	Class	Hometown	Notes
Ismail Mahdi	RB	5'10"	190	Senior	Plano, TX	Declared by 2026 NFL Draft
Deshawn McKnight	DL	6'4"	275	Senior	Sumter, SC	Exhausted eligibility
Ty Buchanan	OL	6'6"	290	Senior	Corpus Christi, TX	Declared by 2026 NFL Draft
Kris Hutson	WR	5'11"	175	Senior	Compton, CA	Declared by 2026 NFL Draft
Michael Dansby	DB	6'0"	190	Senior	San Jose, CA	Declared by 2026 NFL Draft
Luke Wysong	WR	5'10"	180	Senior	Albuquerque, NM	Declared by 2026 NFL Draft
Cameron Barmore	WR	6'6"	230	Senior	Panama, NY	Exhausted eligibility
Riley Wilson	LB	6'2"	230	Senior	Prosper, TX	Exhausted eligibility
Ayden Garnes	CB	6'0"	175	RS Senior	Philadelphia, PA	Declared by 2026 NFL Draft
Javin Whatley	WR	5'10"	167	Senior	Rockmart, GA	Exhausted eligibility
Max Harris	LB	6'0"	225	Senior	Montgomery, AL	Exhausted eligibility
Malachi Bailey	DL	6'2"	260	Senior	Atlanta, GA	Exhausted eligibility
Tiaoalii Savea	DL	6'4"	295	Senior	Las Vegas, NV	Exhausted eligibility
Ian Wagner	K	6'2"	215	Senior	Sierra Vista, AZ	Declared by 2026 NFL Draft
Avery Salerno	LS	6'0"	220	Senior	Clemmons, NC	Exhausted eligibility
Genesis Smith	S	6′2	204	Junior	Chandler, AZ	Declared by 2026 NFL Draft
Sam Olson	TE	6'3	238	Senior	Visalia, CA	Exhausted eligibility
Shannco Matautia	OL	6'2	346	Senior	Anaheim, CA	Exhausted eligibility
Ka'ena DeCarmbra	OL	6'3"	320	Senior	Honolulu, HI	Exhausted eligibility
Chubba Maae	DL	6'2	347	Senior	Long Beach, CA	Exhausted eligibility
Treydan Stukes	CB	6'2	200	Redshirt Senior	Litchfield Park, AZ	Exhausted eligibility
Dalton Johnson	DB	5'11	198	Redshirt Senior	Katy, TX	Exhausted eligibility

=== Recruiting class ===
The following recruits and transfers have signed letters of intent or verbally committed to the Arizona Wildcats football program for the 2026 recruiting year.

College recruiting
Name	Hometown	School	Height	Weight	Commit date
Prince Williams; Defensive end	Las Vegas, NV	Bishop Gorman High School	6 ft 2 in (1.88 m)	255 lb (116 kg)	Jul 4, 2025
Prince Williams; Defensive end	Recruit ratings: 247Sports: On3: ESPN: (81)				
Oscar Rios; Quarterback	Downey, CA	Downey High School	6 ft 3 in (1.91 m)	175 lb (79 kg)	Jun 27, 2025
Oscar Rios; Quarterback	Recruit ratings: 247Sports: ESPN: (81)				
Manoah Faupusa; Defensive tackle	San Francisco, CA	St. Ignatius High School	6 ft 2 in (1.88 m)	310 lb (140 kg)	Jul 5, 2025
Manoah Faupusa; Defensive tackle	Recruit ratings: 247Sports: On3: ESPN: (79)				
Malachi Joyner; Offensive tackle	Gilbert, AZ	Williams Field High School	6 ft 4 in (1.93 m)	290 lb (130 kg)	Jun 8, 2025
Malachi Joyner; Offensive tackle	Recruit ratings: 247Sports: On3: ESPN: (78)				
Keytrin Harris; Defensive tackle	Harbor City, CA	Narbonne High School	6 ft 4 in (1.93 m)	250 lb (110 kg)	Jul 5, 2025
Keytrin Harris; Defensive tackle	Recruit ratings: 247Sports: ESPN: (78)				
Justin Morales; Offensive tackle	El Paso, TX	Franklin High School	6 ft 4 in (1.93 m)	260 lb (120 kg)	Nov 30, 2025
Justin Morales; Offensive tackle	Recruit ratings: 247Sports: On3: ESPN: (78)				
RJ Mosley; Wide receiver	Pittsburg, CA	Pittsburg High School	6 ft 3 in (1.91 m)	185 lb (84 kg)	Jun 15, 2025
RJ Mosley; Wide receiver	Recruit ratings: 247Sports: On3: ESPN: (77)				
Xaier Hiler; Cornerback	Denton, TX	Billy Ryan High School	6 ft 3 in (1.91 m)	185 lb (84 kg)	Jun 16, 2025
Xaier Hiler; Cornerback	Recruit ratings: 247Sports: On3: ESPN: (77)				
Caleb Smith; Wide receiver	Allen, TX	Allen High School	5 ft 8 in (1.73 m)	160 lb (73 kg)	Apr 4, 2025
Caleb Smith; Wide receiver	Recruit ratings: 247Sports: On3: ESPN: (77)				
Khalil Sanogo; Offensive tackle	Mansfield, TX	Mansfield Legacy High School	6 ft 4 in (1.93 m)	270 lb (120 kg)	Jul 26, 2025
Khalil Sanogo; Offensive tackle	Recruit ratings: 247Sports: On3: ESPN: (77)				
Kevin Moorer; Defensive tackle	Mobile, AL	Hutchinson Community College (JC)	6 ft 3 in (1.91 m)	270 lb (120 kg)	Nov 29, 2025
Kevin Moorer; Defensive tackle	Recruit ratings: 247Sports: On3: ESPN: (77)				
Hamisi Juma; Safety	Chandler, AZ	Chandler High School	6 ft 3 in (1.91 m)	190 lb (86 kg)	Sep 28, 2024
Hamisi Juma; Safety	Recruit ratings: 247Sports: On3: ESPN: (77)				
Henry Gabalis; Tight end	Everett, WA	Archbishop Murphy High School	6 ft 1 in (1.85 m)	210 lb (95 kg)	Apr 19, 2025
Henry Gabalis; Tight end	Recruit ratings: 247Sports: On3: ESPN: (77)				
Nathan Allen; Offensive guard	Phoenix, AZ	North High School	6 ft 5 in (1.96 m)	270 lb (120 kg)	Jun 17, 2025
Nathan Allen; Offensive guard	Recruit ratings: 247Sports: On3: ESPN: (76)				
Harvie Moeai; Defensive end	Lehi, UT	Skyridge High School	6 ft 3 in (1.91 m)	225 lb (102 kg)	Jun 9, 2025
Harvie Moeai; Defensive end	Recruit ratings: 247Sports: On3: ESPN: (76)				
Hannibal Navies; Safety	Buford, GA	Grayson High School	5 ft 10 in (1.78 m)	200 lb (91 kg)	Nov 5, 2025
Hannibal Navies; Safety	Recruit ratings: 247Sports: On3: ESPN: (76)				
Jaden Parker; Inside linebacker	Anna, TX	Anna High School	6 ft 0 in (1.83 m)	215 lb (98 kg)	Jun 15, 2025
Jaden Parker; Inside linebacker	Recruit ratings: 247Sports: On3: ESPN: (75)				
Dash Fifita; Inside linebacker	Rancho Santa Margarita, CA	Santa Margarita Catholic High School	5 ft 9 in (1.75 m)	190 lb (86 kg)	Feb 2, 2025
Dash Fifita; Inside linebacker	Recruit ratings: 247Sports: On3: ESPN: (74)				
Kingston Spivey; Cornerback	Chandler, AZ	Hamilton High School	5 ft 9 in (1.75 m)	160 lb (73 kg)	Jan 7, 2026
Kingston Spivey; Cornerback	Recruit ratings: 247Sports: On3:				
Chase Ridley; Punter	Perth, Australia	ProKick Australia	6 ft 3 in (1.91 m)	233 lb (106 kg)	Jan 9, 2026
Chase Ridley; Punter	Recruit ratings: 247Sports:				
Brandon Holmes; Defensive back	Tempe, AZ	Fresno City College (JC)	6 ft 1 in (1.85 m)	180 lb (82 kg)	Jan 10, 2026
Brandon Holmes; Defensive back	Recruit ratings: No ratings found				
Kaisi Lafitaga; Offensive guard	Pago Pago, AS	Tafuna High School	6 ft 3 in (1.91 m)	285 lb (129 kg)	Jun 23, 2025
Kaisi Lafitaga; Offensive guard	Recruit ratings: No ratings found				
Overall recruit ranking: 247Sports: 39 On3: 41 ESPN: NR
‡ Refers to 40-yard dash; Note: In many cases, Scout, Rivals, 247Sports, On3, and ESPN may conflict in their listings of height, weight and 40 time.; In these cases, the average was taken. ESPN grades are on a 100-point scale.; Sources: "2026 Player Commitments – Arizona". ESPN.; "2026 Team Ranking". Rivals.com.; "Arizona 2026 Football Commitments". 247Sports.

*= 247Sports Composite rating; ratings are out of 1.00. (five stars= 1.00–.98, four stars= .97–.90, three stars= .80–.89)
†= Despite being rated as a four and five star recruit by ESPN, On3.com, Rivals.com and 247Sports.com, Williams and Rios received a four star 247Sports Composite rating.
Δ= RB Brandon Smith left the Arizona program following signing but prior to the 2026 season.

2026 overall class rankings

Website	National rank	Conference rank	5 star recruits	4 star recruits	3 star recruits
ESPN	--	--	--	2	17
On3 Recruits/Rivals	41	8	--	5	15
247 Sports	39	6	--	7	16

=== Transfer portal ===
==== Outgoing transfers ====
Name	Pos.	Class	Height	Weight	Hometown	New school
Braedyn Locke	QB	Junior	6'1	195	Rockwall, TX	Tarleton State (FCS)
Jshawn Frausto-Ramos	DB	Junior	6'0"	185	Los Angeles, CA	Washington State
Jack Luttrell	S	Sophomore	6′0	180	Gainesville, GA	Auburn
Marquis Groves-Killebrew	CB	Redshirt Sophomore	6'0	180	Kennesaw, GA	California
Jarra Anderson	DL	Sophomore	6'2	260	Katy, TX	Sam Houston
Michael Wooten	OL	Redshirt Freshman	6'4	310	Simi Valley, CA	South Florida
Jeremiah Patterson	WR	Redshirt Senior	5'9	175	Union City, CA	North Dakota State
Jordan Brown	OL	Redshirt Junior	6'5"	310	Atlanta, GA	Georgia State
Chancellor Owens	DL	Junior	6'3"	280	Shreveport, LA	Texas State
Kaleb Jones	DT	Freshman	6'1"	280	Phoenix, AZ	Iowa State
Edukwa Okundaye	DE	Redshirt Freshman	6'3"	220	Katy, TX	Washington State
Stacy Bey	ILB	Redshirt Freshman	6'1"	205	Fontana, CA	Sam Houston State
Gianni Edwards	CB	Freshman	5'11"	170	Forney, TX	Montana State (FCS)
Kayden Luke	RB	Sophomore	5'11"	220	Tucson, AZ	West Virginia
Keyan Burnett	TE	Senior	6'6"	249	Ladera Ranch, CA	UNLV
Rex Haynes	WR	Redshirt Junior	6'4	204	San Diego, CA	Utah State
Devin Hyatt	WR	Redshirt Sophomore	6'2	192	Bradenton, FL	Miami (OH)
Siale Uluave	OL	Junior	6'4"	350	Mission Hills, CA	Southern Utah (FCS)
Devin Dunn	DB	Redshirt Junior	5'10	189	Chandler, AZ	Montana (FCS)
Tyler Prasuhn	P/K	Freshman	6'2	181	Carlsbad, CA	San Diego State
Chase Randall	TE/LB	Redshirt Junior	6'2	232	Tucson, AZ	TBD

=== Acquisitions ===
Over the off-season, Arizona added twenty-three players from the transfer portal. According to 247 Sports, Arizona had the No. 37 ranked transfer class in the country.

Name	Pos.	Height	Weight	Hometown	Class	Eligibility Remaining	Prev. school
Shane King	TE	6'5	230	Gainesville, GA	Freshman	3	Southern Miss
Drew Nicolson	LS	6'0	221	Tempe, AZ	Redshirt Sophomore	2	Arkansas State
Cole Rusk	TE	6'5	250	Rock Island, IL	Senior	1	Illinois
Cooper Blomstrom	LB	6'3	245	Dover, NH	Redshirt Junior	1	Georgetown (FCS)
DJ Jordan	WR	5'11	170	Los Angeles, CA	Freshman	3	USC
Tyrese Boss	CB	5'11	190	Chino Hills, CA	Redshirt Freshman	3	Wyoming
Everett Roussaw Jr.	LB	6'3	230	Atlanta, GA	Junior	1	Memphis
Arthur Ban	TE	6'5	220	Vancouver, WA	Freshman	3	San Diego State
Zach Henning	OL	6'5	310	Centennial, CO	Sophomore	2	Washington
Malcolm Hartzog Jr.	DB	5'9	185	Silver Creek, MS	Senior	1	Nebraska
Cam Chapa	S	6'1	193	Aurora, CO	Sophomore	2	Northern Colorado (FCS)
Rodney Gallagher III	WR	5'10	181	Uniontown, PA	Junior	1	West Virginia
Nate Hale	OL	6'5	295	Orange, CA	Redshirt Sophomore	2	San Jose State
Dwight Bootle II	DB	5'10	180	Miami, FL	Redshirt Junior	1	Charlotte
Matai Tagoa'i	LB	6'4	205	Las Vegas, NV	Freshman	3	USC
Carter Schwartz	P	6'4	225	Louisville, KY	Redshirt Junior	2	Louisville
Jordan Ross	WR	5'10	180	Anaheim, CA	Sophomore	2	Colorado State
Jake Griffin	OL	6'5	305	Mesa, AZ	Redshirt Sophomore	2	BYU
Lee Molette III	S	6'1	190	Brentwood, TN	Redshirt Senior	1	UConn
Antwan Roberts	RB	6'1	203	Nashville, TN	Redshirt Junior	1	Marshall
Daylen Austin	CB	6'1	199	Long Beach, CA	Redshirt Sophomore	2	Oregon
Zuri Watson	CB	6'1	175	St Petersburg, FL	Redshirt Freshman	3	Howard (FCS)
Ryan Harris	K	5'11	192	San Diego, CA	Junior	1	Washington State

=== Coaching changes ===
==== Coaching staff departures ====
Name	Current Position	New Team	New Position	Source
Alonzo Carter	Running backs coach	Sacramento State	Head coach	

==== Coaching staff additions ====
Name	New Position	Previous Team	Previous Position	Source
Lyle Moevao	Running backs coach	Arizona	Offensive analyst	

== Preseason ==
=== Preseason Big-12 awards ===
2026 Preseason All Big-12 teams

- Noah Fifita, QB, R-Sr.

=== Award watch lists ===
Listed in the order that they were released

Award	Player	Position	Year	Source
Lott Trophy	Tre Smith	Defensive lineman	6th year	
Maxwell Award	Noah Fifita	Quarterback	Sr.	
Outland Trophy	Tristan Bounds	Offensive tackle	5th year	
Bronko Nagurski Trophy	Taye Brown	Linebacker	Sr.	
Wuerffel Trophy	Noah Fifita	Quarterback	Sr.	
Butkus Award	Taye Brown	Linebacker	Sr.	
Walter Camp Award	Noah Fifita	Quarterback	Sr.	
Doak Walker Award	Kedrick Reescano	Running back	Sr.	
Johnny Unitas Golden Arm Award	Noah Fifita	Quarterback	Sr.	
Davey O'Brien Award	Noah Fifita	Quarterback	Sr.	
Comeback Player of the Year Award	Tre Smith	Defensive lineman	6th year	
Comeback Player of the Year Award	Malcolm Hartzog	Defensive back	5th year	
Polynesian College Football Player Of The Year Award	Noah Fifita	Quarterback	Sr.	
Polynesian College Football Player Of The Year Award	Mays Pese	Defensive lineman	So.	
Polynesian College Football Player Of The Year Award	Rhino Tapa'atoutai	Offensive lineman	Sr.	
Bednarik Award	Taye Brown	Linebacker	Sr.	
Manning Award	Noah Fifita	Quarterback	Sr.	
Earl Campbell Tyler Rose Award	Kedrick Reescano	Running back	Sr.	

== Schedule ==
Date	Time	Opponent	Rank	Site	TV	Result	Attendance
September 5	6:30 p.m.	No. 22 (FCS) Northern Arizona*		Casino Del Sol Stadium; Tucson, AZ	ESPN+	W 35–7	40,129
September 12	12:30 p.m.	at No. 15 BYU		LaVell Edwards Stadium; Provo, UT	FOX	L 17–28	64,409
September 19	7:30 p.m.	Northern Illinois*		Casino Del Sol Stadium; Tucson, AZ	TNT/TruTV	W 42–17	40,413
September 26	4:30 p.m.	at Washington State*		Martin Stadium; Pullman, WA	CBS	W 34–24	23,903
October 3	8:00 p.m.	Cincinnati		Casino Del Sol Stadium; Tucson, AZ	FOX	W 34–7	43,760
October 10	9:00 a.m.	at West Virginia		Milan Puskar Stadium; Morgantown, WV	TNT	W 52–31	50,121
October 24	4:30 p.m.	Iowa State^{†}	No. 25	Casino Del Sol Stadium; Tucson, AZ	ESPN2	W 39–3	45,477
October 31	9:00 a.m.	at No. 13 Texas Tech	No. 22	Galaxy Stadium; Lubbock, TX	ESPN	L 26–34	59,131
November 6	8:15 p.m.	TCU	No. 22	Casino Del Sol Stadium; Tucson, AZ	ESPN	W 29–28	40,501
November 14	8:30 p.m.	No. 2 Utah	No. 23	Casino Del Sol Stadium; Tucson, AZ (Big Noon Kickoff)	FOX	L 39–40	48,858
November 21	5:00 p.m.	at Kansas State	No. 19	Bill Snyder Family Football Stadium; Manhattan, KS	FS1	W 35–28 ^{OT}	49,807
November 28	7:00 p.m.	Arizona State		Casino Del Sol Stadium; Tucson, AZ (The Duel in the Desert)	FOX	–	
*Non-conference game; ^{†}Homecoming; Rankings from AP Poll (and CFP Rankings, after November 3) - Released prior to game; All times are in Mountain time

== Game summaries ==
=== No. 22 (FCS) Northern Arizona ===
Uniform Combination
Helmet	Jersey	Pants

No. 22 (FCS) Northern Arizona Lumberjacks (1–0) at Arizona Wildcats (0–0) – Game summary

Quarter	1	2	3	4	Total
No. 22 (FCS) Lumberjacks	0	0	0	7	7
Wildcats	7	14	7	7	35

at Casino Del Sol Stadium • Tucson, AZ

- Date: September 5, 2026
- Game time: 6:30 p.m.
- Game weather: Sunny, 93 °F (34 °C)
- Game attendance: 40,129
- Referee: Kevin Boitmann
- TV announcers (ESPN+): Chris Sylvester (play-by-play) and Jordan Reid (analyst)
- Box Score

Game information

First quarter

- (11:32) ARIZ – Tre Spivey 20-yard pass from Noah Fifita, Michael Salgado-Medina kick (Drive: 9 plays, 75 yards, 3:28; Arizona 7–0)

Second quarter

- (10:41) ARIZ – Brandon Phelps 21-yard pass from Noah Fifita, Michael Salgado-Medina kick (Drive: 6 plays, 57 yards, 2:45; Arizona 14–0)
- (3:20) ARIZ – Kedrick Reescano 1-yard run, Michael Salgado-Medina kick (Drive: 9 plays, 56 yards, 4:41; Arizona 21–0)

Third quarter

- (5:01) ARIZ – Antwan Roberts 14-yard run, Michael Salgado-Medina kick (Drive: 4 plays, 50 yards, 1:38; Arizona 28–0)

Fourth quarter

- (13:52) ARIZ – Kedrick Reescano 1-yard run, Michael Salgado-Medina kick (Drive: 6 plays, 32 yards, 2:18; Arizona 35–0)
- (10:55) NAU – Noble Young-Blackgoat 36-yard interception return, Francisco Orduno Jr. kick (Arizona 35–7)

Statistics	NAU	ARIZ
First downs	8	28
Plays–yards	52–193	72–520
Rushes–yards	21–(-7)	35–206
Passing yards	200	314
Passing: Comp–Att–Int	19–31–1	27–37–1
Turnovers	1	3
Time of possession	27:48	32:12

Team	Category	Player	Statistics
Northern Arizona	Passing	Ty Pennington	15/26, 180 yards, INT
Northern Arizona	Rushing	Quran Gossett	11 carries, 20 yards
Northern Arizona	Receiving	Joey Stout	6 receptions, 39 yards
Arizona	Passing	Noah Fifita	22/29, 262 yards, 2 TD
Arizona	Rushing	Kedrick Reescano	10 carries, 48 yards, 2 TD
Arizona	Receiving	Gio Richardson	8 receptions, 96 yards

=== at No. 15 BYU ===
Uniform Combination
Helmet	Jersey	Pants

Arizona Wildcats (1–0) at No. 15 BYU Cougars (1–0) – Game summary

Quarter	1	2	3	4	Total
Wildcats	10	7	0	0	17
No. 15 Cougars	7	7	7	7	28

at LaVell Edwards Stadium • Provo, UT

- Date: September 12, 2026
- Game time: 12:30 p.m.
- Game weather: Sunny, 84 °F (29 °C)
- Game attendance: 64,409
- Referee: Michael VanderVelde
- TV announcers (FOX): Connor Onion (play-by-play), Robert Griffin III (analyst), and Alexa Landestoy (sideline reporter)
- Box Score

Game information

First quarter

- (9:10) ARIZ – Noah Fifita 11-yard run, Michael Salgado-Medina kick (Drive: 12 plays, 75 yards, 5:50; Arizona 7–0)
- (5:16) BYU – Bear Bachmeier 6-yard run, Matthias Dunn kick (Drive: 2 plays, 9 yards, 0:42; Tied 7–7)
- (0:24) ARIZ – Michael Salgado-Medina 37-yard field goal (Drive: 12 plays, 55 yards, 4:52; Arizona 10–7)

Second quarter

- (12:46) BYU – Reggie Frischknecht 25-yard pass from Bear Bachmeier, Matthias Dunn kick (Drive: 8 plays, 75 yards, 2:38; BYU 14–10)
- (2:03) ARIZ – Shane King 16-yard pass from Noah Fifita, Michael Salgado-Medina kick (Drive: 10 plays, 72 yards, 5:15; Arizona 17–14)

Third quarter

- (9:37) BYU – Kyler Kasper 6-yard pass from Bear Bachmeier, Matthias Dunn kick (Drive: 9 plays, 75 yards, 5:23; BYU 21–17)

Fourth quarter

- (6:10) BYU – Kyler Kasper 12-yard pass from Bear Bachmeier, Matthias Dunn kick (Drive: 4 plays, 82 yards, 2:06; BYU 28–17)

Statistics	ARIZ	BYU
First downs	19	17
Plays–yards	62–327	56–365
Rushes–yards	31–97	30–148
Passing yards	230	217
Passing: comp–att–int	23–31–1	16–26–0
Turnovers	1	0
Time of possession	33:41	26:19

Team	Category	Player	Statistics
Arizona	Passing	Noah Fifita	23/31, 230 yards, TD, INT
Arizona	Rushing	Kedrick Reescano	15 carries, 49 yards
Arizona	Receiving	Cole Rusk	2 receptions, 48 yards
BYU	Passing	Bear Bachmeier	16/26, 217 yards, 3 TD
BYU	Rushing	LJ Martin	20 carries, 98 yards
BYU	Receiving	Legend Glasker	3 receptions, 74 yards

=== Northern Illinois ===
Uniform Combination
Helmet	Jersey	Pants

Northern Illinois Huskies (0–2) at Arizona Wildcats (1–1) – Game summary

Quarter	1	2	3	4	Total
Huskies	10	0	0	7	17
Wildcats	7	21	7	7	42

at Casino Del Sol Stadium • Tucson, AZ

- Date: September 19, 2026
- Game time: 7:30 p.m.
- Game weather: Sunny, 84 °F (29 °C)
- Game attendance: 40,413
- Referee: Michael McCabe
- TV announcers (TNT): J.B. Long (play-by-play), Mike Golic Jr. (analyst) and Coy Wire (analyst)

Game information

First quarter

- (11:24) NIU – JJ Schlenhardt 38-yard field goal (Drive: 10 plays, 54 yards, 3:36; Northern Illinois 3–0)
- (9:07) NIU – Cam Thompson 52-yard pass from Taron Dickens, JJ Schlenhardt kick (Drive: 1 play, 52 yards, 0:09; Northern Illinois 10–0)
- (6:01) ARIZ – Chris Hunter 38-yard pass from Noah Fifita, Michael Salgado-Medina kick (Drive: 7 plays, 86 yards, 3:01; Northern Illinois 10–7)

Second quarter

- (11:13) ARIZ – Isaiah Mizell 14-yard pass from Noah Fifita, Michael Salgado-Medina kick (Drive: 13 plays, 76 yards, 4:55; Arizona 14–10)
- (3:54) ARIZ – Tre Spivey 10-yard pass from Noah Fifita, Michael Salgado-Medina kick (Drive: 7 plays, 80 yards, 3:08; Arizona 21–10)
- (2:13) ARIZ – Caleb Smith 69-yard punt return, Michael Salgado-Medina kick (Arizona 28–10)

Third quarter

- (9:01) ARIZ – Tyler Powell 3-yard pass from Noah Fifita, Michael Salgado-Medina kick (Drive: 13 plays, 75 yards, 5:59; Arizona 35–10)

Fourth quarter

- (7:54) ARIZ – Noah Fifita 30-yard run, Michael Salgado-Medina kick (Drive: 11 plays, 80 yards, 7:48; Arizona 42–10)
- (0:13) NIU – Elijah Porter 1-yard run, JJ Schlenhardt kick (Drive: 9 plays, 48 yards, 3:20; Arizona 42–17)

Statistics	NIU	ARIZ
First downs	20	22
Plays–yards	67–341	64–441
Rushes–yards	24–86	27–84
Passing yards	255	357
Passing: Comp–Att–Int	29–43–0	32–37–1
Turnovers	0	1
Time of possession	29:40	30:20

Team	Category	Player	Statistics
Northern Illinois	Passing	Taron Dickens	25/37, 228 yards, TD
Northern Illinois	Rushing	Telly Johnson Jr.	12 carries, 69 yards
Northern Illinois	Receiving	DeAree Rogers	10 receptions, 68 yards
Arizona	Passing	Noah Fifita	31/34, 325 yards, 4 TD
Arizona	Rushing	Kedrick Reescano	8 carries, 30 yards
Arizona	Receiving	Tre Spivey	6 receptions, 90 yards, TD

=== at Washington State ===
Uniform Combination
Helmet	Jersey	Pants

Arizona Wildcats (2–1) at Washington State Cougars (1–2) – Game summary

Quarter	1	2	3	4	Total
Wildcats	7	7	7	13	34
Cougars	14	3	0	7	24

at Martin Stadium • Pullman, WA

- Date: September 26, 2026
- Game time: 4:30 p.m.
- Game weather: Sunny, 60 °F (16 °C)
- Game attendance: 23,903
- Referee: Chris Wiggins
- TV announcers (CBS): Rich Waltz (play-by-play), Adam Breneman (analyst), Brian Kelly (analyst), and Jordan Giorgio (sideline reporter)

Game information

First quarter

- (0:13) WSU – Caden Pinnick 11-yard run, Jack Stevens kick (Drive: 10 plays, 71 yards, 3:28; Washington State 7–0)
- (2:05) WSU – Jackquintin Bal 25-yard interception return, Jack Stevens kick (Washington State 14–0)
- (0:08) ARIZ – Tre Spivey 28-yard pass from Noah Fifita, Michael Salgado-Medina kick (Drive: 5 plays, 75 yards, 1:57; Washington State 14–7)

Second quarter

- (7:42) ARIZ – Tre Spivey 4-yard pass from Noah Fifita, Michael Salgado-Medina kick (Drive: 13 plays, 78 yards, 6:20; Tied 14–14)
- (0:22) WSU – Jack Stevens 38-yard field goal (Drive: 8 plays, 52 yards, 1:31; Washington State 17–14)

Third quarter

- (4:02) ARIZ – Caleb Smith 38-yard pass from Noah Fifita, Michael Salgado-Medina kick (Drive: 3 plays, 82 yards, 0:42; Arizona 21–17)

Fourth quarter

- (12:49) ARIZ – Michael Salgado-Medina 27-yard field goal (Drive: 11 plays, 70 yards, 3:27; Arizona 24–17)
- (9:07) ARIZ – Isaiah Mizell 11-yard pass from Noah Fifita, Michael Salgado-Medina kick (Drive: 7 plays, 69 yards, 3:08; Arizona 31–17)
- (7:15) WSU – Branden Ganashamoorthy 46-yard pass from Caden Pinnick, Jack Stevens kick (Drive: 6 plays, 75 yards, 1:52; Arizona 31–24)
- (1:57) ARIZ – Michael Salgado-Medina 51-yard field goal (Drive: 11 plays, 41 yards, 5:18; Arizona 34–24)

Statistics	ARIZ	WSU
First downs	24	23
Plays–yards	74–447	71–335
Rushes–yards	38–150	30–94
Passing yards	297	241
Passing: comp–att–int	22–36–1	24–41–1
Turnovers	1	2
Time of possession	34:02	25:58

Team	Category	Player	Statistics
Arizona	Passing	Noah Fifita	22/36, 297 yards, 4 TD, INT
Arizona	Rushing	Ismail Mahdi	10 carries, 63 yards
Arizona	Receiving	Tre Spivey	7 receptions, 129 yards, 2 TD
Washington State	Passing	Caden Pinnick	24/41, 241 yards, TD, INT
Washington State	Rushing	Kirby Vorhees	9 carries, 39 yards
Washington State	Receiving	Branden Ganashamoorthy	4 receptions, 67 yards, TD

=== Cincinnati ===
Uniform Combination
Helmet	Jersey	Pants

Cincinnati Bearcats (4–0) vs Arizona Wildcats (3–1) – Game summary

Quarter	1	2	3	4	Total
Bearcats	0	0	0	7	7
Wildcats	7	3	14	10	34

at Casino Del Sol Stadium • Tucson, AZ

- Date: October 3, 2026
- Game time: 8:00 p.m.
- Game weather: Sunny, 80 °F (27 °C)
- Game attendance: 43,760
- Referee: Henry Johns
- TV announcers (FOX): Jack Kizer (play-by-play) and Mark Helfrich (analyst)

Game information

First quarter

- (10:21) ARIZ – Kedrick Reescano 10-yard run, Michael Salgado-Medina kick (Drive: 10 plays, 75 yards, 4:38; Arizona 7–0)

Second quarter

- (0:01) ARIZ – Michael Salgado-Medina 23-yard field goal (Drive: 16 plays, 92 yards, 5:48; Arizona 10–0)

Third quarter

- (9:29) ARIZ – Noah Fifita 8-yard run, Michael Salgado-Medina kick (Drive: 7 plays, 80 yards, 3:38; Arizona 17–0)
- (3:07) ARIZ – Brandon Phelps 24-yard pass from Noah Fifita, Michael Salgado-Medina kick (Drive: 6 plays, 68 yards, 2:26; Arizona 24–0)

Fourth quarter

- (12:11) ARIZ – Michael Salgado-Medina 35-yard field goal (Drive: 10 plays, 52 yards, 4:41; Arizona 27–0)
- (5:21) ARIZ – Tyler Powell 5-yard pass from Noah Fifita, Michael Salgado-Medina kick (Drive: 13 plays, 71 yards, 6:06; Arizona 34–0)
- (1:56) CIN – JC French IV 2-yard run, Stephen Rusnak kick (Drive: 9 plays, 75 yards, 3:25; Arizona 34–7)

Statistics	CIN	ARIZ
First downs	12	30
Plays–yards	57–227	78–522
Rushes–yards	28–74	41–238
Passing yards	153	284
Passing: Comp–Att–Int	16–29–0	25–37–1
Turnovers	0	1
Time of possession	24:21	35:39

Team	Category	Player	Statistics
Cincinnati	Passing	JC French IV	16/29, 153 yards
Cincinnati	Rushing	JC French IV	9 carries, 29 yards, TD
Cincinnati	Receiving	Isaiah Johnson	6 receptions, 60 yards
Arizona	Passing	Noah Fifita	25/37, 284 yards, 2 TD, INT
Arizona	Rushing	Antwan Roberts Jr.	5 carries, 87 yards
Arizona	Receiving	Isaiah Mizell	4 receptions, 67 yards

=== at West Virginia ===
Uniform Combination
Helmet	Jersey	Pants

Arizona Wildcats (4–1) at West Virginia Mountaineers (3–2) – Game summary

Quarter	1	2	3	4	Total
Wildcats	14	10	14	14	52
Mountaineers	3	14	7	7	31

at Milan Puskar Stadium • Morgantown, WV

- Date: October 10, 2026
- Game time: 9:00 a.m.
- Game weather: Cloudy, 65 °F (18 °C)
- Game attendance: 50,121
- Referee: Stephon Baron
- TV announcers (TNT/TruTV): J.B. Long (play-by-play), Mike Golic Jr. (analyst) and Allie LaForce (sideline reporter)

Game information

First quarter

- (10:12) WVU – Jack Cassidy 23-yard field goal (Drive: 13 plays, 58 yards, 4:48; West Virginia 3–0)
- (5:40) ARIZ – Isaiah Mizell 14-yard pass from Noah Fifita, Michael Salgado-Medina kick (Drive: 11 plays, 75 yards, 4:37; Arizona 7–3)
- (5:12) ARIZ – Lee Molette III 32-yard fumble return, Michael Salgado-Medina kick (Arizona 14–3)

Second quarter

- (13:02) WVU – Michael Hawkins Jr. 3-yard run, Jack Cassidy kick (Drive: 1 play, 3 yards, 0:04; Arizona 14–10)
- (10:02) ARIZ – Michael Salgado-Medina 44-yard field goal (Drive: 9 plays, 48 yards, 3:01; Arizona 17–10)
- (7:47) WVU – Cam Cook 30-yard run, Jack Cassidy kick (Drive: 8 plays, 75 yards, 2:18; Tied 17–17)
- (2:58) ARIZ – Quincy Craig 40-yard run, Michael Salgado-Medina kick (Drive: 4 plays, 58 yards, 1:24; Arizona 24–17)

Third quarter

- (13:51) ARIZ – Kedrick Reescano 8-yard run, Michael Salgado-Medina kick (Drive: 4 plays, 75 yards, 1:13; Arizona 31–17)
- (1:30) WVU – Amari Latimer 2-yard run, Jack Cassidy kick (Drive: 16 plays, 92 yards, 6:40; Arizona 31–24)
- (0:21) ARIZ – Isaiah Mizell 72-yard pass from Noah Fifita, Michael Salgado-Medina kick (Drive: 4 plays, 75 yards, 1:15; Arizona 38–24)

Fourth quarter

- (12:33) WVU – Cam Cook 1-yard run, Jack Cassidy kick (Drive: 9 plays, 75 yards, 2:40; Arizona 38–31)
- (11:43) ARIZ – Brandon Phelps 42-yard pass from Noah Fifita, Michael Salgado-Medina kick (Drive: 2 plays, 75 yards, 0:58; Arizona 45–31)
- (9:45) ARIZ – Antwan Roberts Jr. 30-yard run, Michael Salgado-Medina kick (Drive: 2 plays, 52 yards, 0:49; Arizona 52–31)

Statistics	ARIZ	WVU
First downs	20	30
Plays–yards	51–482	104–522
Rushes–yards	27–141	76–303
Passing yards	153	284
Passing: comp–att–int	17–24–1	11–28–0
Turnovers	1	2
Time of possession	24:10	35:50

Team	Category	Player	Statistics
Arizona	Passing	Noah Fifita	16/23, 341 yards, 3 TD, INT
Arizona	Rushing	Antwan Roberts Jr.	7 carries, 63 yards, TD
Arizona	Receiving	Isaiah Mizell	6 receptions, 183 yards, 2 TD
West Virginia	Passing	Michael Hawkins Jr.	11/28, 219 yards, TD
West Virginia	Rushing	Cam Cook	34 carries, 131 yards, 2 TD
West Virginia	Receiving	Prince Strachan	5 receptions, 121 yards

=== Iowa State ===
Uniform Combination
Helmet	Jersey	Pants

Iowa State Cyclones (3–3) vs No. 25 Arizona Wildcats (5–1) – Game summary

Quarter	1	2	3	4	Total
Cyclones	3	0	0	0	3
No. 25 Wildcats	15	10	0	14	39

at Casino Del Sol Stadium • Tucson, AZ

- Date: October 24, 2026
- Game time: 4:30 p.m.
- Game weather: Sunny, 73 °F (23 °C)
- Game attendance: 45,477
- Referee: Luke Richmond
- TV announcers (ESPN2): Lowell Galindo (play-by-play), Kirk Morrison (analyst), and Dawn Davenport (sideline reporter)

Game information

First quarter

- (14:29) ARIZ – Isaiah Mizell 71-yard pass from Noah Fifita, Henry Gabalis two-point pass to Tyler Powell (Drive: 2 plays, 75 yards, 0:31; Arizona 8–0)
- (9:45) ARIZ – Quincy Craig 6-yard run, Michael Salgado-Medina kick (Drive: 13 plays, 80 yards, 6:53; Arizona 15–0)
- (1:06) ISU – Kyle Konrardy 40-yard field goal (Drive: 7 plays, 53 yards, 4:45; Arizona 15–3)

Second quarter

- (12:54) ARIZ – Michael Salgado-Medina 53-yard field goal (Drive: 8 plays, 39 yards, 3:12; Arizona 18–3)
- (1:55) ARIZ – Kedrick Reescano 5-yard run, Michael Salgado-Medina kick (Drive: 15 plays, 80 yards, 7:20; Arizona 25–3)

Third quarter

- No scoring plays

Fourth quarter

- (6:41) ARIZ – Henry Gabalis 40-yard pass from Noah Fifita, Michael Salgado-Medina kick (Drive: 8 plays, 78 yards, 4:29; Arizona 32–3)
- (1:55) ARIZ – Sawyer Anderson 4-yard run, Ian French kick (Drive: 6 plays, 36 yards, 3:09; Arizona 39–3)

Statistics	ISU	ARIZ
First downs	14	24
Plays–yards	58–221	73–477
Rushes–yards	31–52	36–141
Passing yards	169	336
Passing: Comp–Att–Int	15–27–0	30–37–0
Turnovers	1	0
Time of possession	25:34	34:26

Team	Category	Player	Statistics
Iowa State	Passing	Jaylen Raynor	8/10, 106 yards
Iowa State	Rushing	Aiden Flora	12 carries, 36 yards
Iowa State	Receiving	Vince Benetti	3 receptions, 42 yards
Arizona	Passing	Noah Fifita	27/34, 308 yards, 2 TD
Arizona	Rushing	Quincy Craig	9 carries, 51 yards, TD
Arizona	Receiving	Isaiah Mizell	8 receptions, 134 yards, TD

=== at No. 13 Texas Tech ===
Uniform Combination
Helmet	Jersey	Pants

No. 22 Arizona Wildcats (6–1) at No. 13 Texas Tech Red Raiders (6–1) – Game summary

Quarter	1	2	3	4	Total
No. 22 Wildcats	3	14	6	3	26
No. 13 Red Raiders	7	3	14	10	34

at Galaxy Stadium • Lubbock, TX

- Date: October 31, 2026
- Game time: 9:00 a.m.
- Game weather: Cloudy, 55 °F (13 °C)
- Game attendance: 59,131
- Referee: Tutashinda Salaam
- TV announcers (ESPN): Dave Pasch (play-by-play), Dusty Dvoracek (analyst), and Taylor McGregor (sideline reporter)

Game information
First quarter
- (11:35) ARIZ – Michael Salgado-Medina 35-yard field goal (Drive: 7 plays, 57 yards, 3:25; Arizona 3–0)
- (7:03) TTU – Terrance Carter Jr. 24-yard pass from Tommy Castellanos, Stone Harrington kick (Drive: 13 plays, 75 yards, 4:32; Texas Tech 7–3)

Second quarter

- (10:02) ARIZ – Isaiah Mizell 94-yard pass from Noah Fifita, Michael Salgado-Medina kick (Drive: 3 plays, 92 yards, 1:27; Arizona 10–7)
- (1:56) ARIZ – Kedrick Reescano 5-yard run, Michael Salgado-Medina kick (Drive: 14 plays, 89 yards, 7:07; Arizona 17–7)
- (0:24) TTU – Stone Harrington 29-yard field goal (Drive: 9 plays, 64 yards, 1:32; Arizona 17–10)

Third quarter

- (10:02) TTU – Tommy Castellanos 8-yard run, Stone Harrington kick (Drive: 12 plays, 75 yards, 4:58; Tied 17–17)
- (5:34) ARIZ – Kedrick Reescano 1-yard run, kick failed (Drive: 10 plays, 75 yards, 4:28; Arizona 23–17)
- (2:33) TTU – Kenny Johnson 27-yard pass from Tommy Castellanos, Stone Harrington kick (Drive: 7 plays, 75 yards, 3:01; Texas Tech 24–23)

Fourth quarter

- (14:43) TTU – Stone Harrington 42-yard field goal (Drive: 5 plays, 27 yards, 1:20; Texas Tech 27–23)
- (2:05) TTU – J'Koby Williams 64-yard run, Stone Harrington kick (Drive: 3 plays, 73 yards, 0:53; Texas Tech 34–23)
- (0:22) ARIZ – Michael Salgado-Medina 22-yard field goal (Drive: 13 plays, 70 yards, 1:43; Texas Tech 34–26)

Statistics	ARIZ	TTU
First downs	18	20
Total yards	429	472
Rushing yards	12	328
Passing yards	417	144
Turnovers	0	1
Time of possession	33:20	26:40

Team	Category	Player	Statistics
Arizona	Passing	Noah Fifita	33/45, 417 yards, TD
Arizona	Rushing	Kedrick Reescano	9 rushes, 18 yards, 2 TD
Arizona	Receiving	Isaiah Mizell	7 receptions, 182 yards, TD
Texas Tech	Passing	Tommy Castellanos	11/24, 144 yards, 2 TD
Texas Tech	Rushing	J'Koby Williams	14 rushes, 175 yards, TD
Texas Tech	Receiving	Kenny Johnson	4 receptions, 49 yards, TD

=== TCU ===
Uniform Combination
Helmet	Jersey	Pants

TCU Horned Frogs (4–4) vs No. 22 Arizona Wildcats (6–2) – Game summary

Quarter	1	2	3	4	Total
Horned Frogs	0	14	7	7	28
No. 22 Wildcats	10	0	7	12	29

at Casino Del Sol Stadium • Tucson, AZ

- Date: November 6, 2026
- Game time: 8:15 p.m.
- Game weather: Clear, 62 °F (17 °C)
- Game attendance: 40,501
- Referee: Cravonne Barrett
- TV announcers (ESPN): Anish Shroff (play-by-play), Andre Ware (analyst), and Morgan Uber (sideline reporter)

Game information

First quarter

- (10:39) ARIZ – Isaiah Mizell 20-yard pass from Noah Fifita, Michael Salgado-Medina kick (Drive: 10 plays, 75 yards, 4:21; Arizona 7–0)
- (4:06) ARIZ – Michael Salgado-Medina 43-yard field goal (Drive: 9 plays, 46 yards, 4:34; Arizona 10–0)

Second quarter

- (8:53) TCU – Jaden Craig 5-yard run, Kyle Lemmerman kick (Drive: 8 plays, 61 yards, 3:39; Arizona 10–7)
- (4:09) TCU – Hudson Hooper 93-yard interception return, Kyle Lemmerman kick (TCU 14–10)

Third quarter

- (8:14) ARIZ – Noah Fifita 9-yard run, Michael Salgado-Medina kick (Drive: 5 plays, 62 yards, 2:29; Arizona 17–14)
- (2:39) TCU – Jordan Dwyer 6-yard pass from Jaden Craig, Kyle Lemmerman kick (Drive: 11 plays, 75 yards, 5:35; TCU 21–17)

Fourth quarter

- (14:57) ARIZ – Michael Salgado-Medina 23-yard field goal (Drive: 8 plays, 69 yards, 2:42; TCU 21–20)
- (6:35) TCU – Jaden Craig 2-yard run, Kyle Lemmerman kick (Drive: 10 plays, 77 yards, 4:59; TCU 28–20)
- (1:45) ARIZ – Quincy Craig 15-yard pass from Noah Fifita, two-point pass failed (Drive: 11 plays, 75 yards, 4:50; TCU 28–26)
- (0:38) ARIZ – Michael Salgado-Medina 37-yard field goal (Drive: 4 plays, 6 yards, 1:06; Arizona 29–26)

Statistics	TCU	ARIZ
First downs	22	21
Plays–yards	62–281	70–441
Rushes–yards	21–49	33–128
Passing yards	232	313
Passing: Comp–Att–Int	28–41–1	24–37–1
Turnovers	2	1
Time of possession	28:02	31:58

Team	Category	Player	Statistics
TCU	Passing	Jaden Craig	28/41, 232 yards, TD, INT
TCU	Rushing	Amante Martin	8 carries, 35 yards
TCU	Receiving	Kari Ashley	14 receptions, 95 yards
Arizona	Passing	Noah Fifita	24/37, 313 yards, 2 TD, INT
Arizona	Rushing	Kedrick Reescano	10 carries, 52 yards
Arizona	Receiving	Gio Richardson	11 receptions, 171 yards

=== No. 2 Utah ===
Uniform Combination
Helmet	Jersey	Jersey

No. 2 Utah Utes (9–0) vs No. 23 Arizona Wildcats (7–2) – Game summary

Quarter	1	2	3	4	Total
No. 2 Utes	0	17	7	16	40
No. 23 Wildcats	7	7	14	11	39

at Casino Del Sol Stadium • Tucson, AZ

- Date: November 14, 2026
- Game time: 8:30 p.m.
- Game weather: Clear, 67 °F (19 °C)
- Game attendance: 48,858
- Referee: Kevin Boitmann
- TV announcers (Fox): Gus Johnson (play-by-play), Joel Klatt (analyst), and Jenny Taft (sideline reporter)

Game information

First quarter

- (9:45) ARIZ – Quincy Craig 1-yard run, Michael Salgado-Medina kick (Drive: 11 plays, 75 yards, 5:15; Arizona 7–0)

Second quarter

- (14:55) UTAH – Dillon Curtis 53-yard field goal (Drive: 5 plays, 7 yards, 2:12; Arizona 7–3)
- (9:48) ARIZ – Kedrick Reescano 5-yard run, Michael Salgado-Medina kick (Drive: 10 plays, 75 yards, 5:07; Arizona 14–3)
- (6:27) UTAH – Devon Dampier 14-yard run, Dillon Curtis kick (Drive: 7 plays, 80 yards, 3:15; Arizona 14–10)
- (1:34) UTAH – Devon Dampier 18-yard run, Dillon Curtis kick (Drive: 8 plays, 75 yards, 3:19; Utah 17–14)

Third quarter

- (11:53) ARIZ – Isaiah Mizell 6-yard pass from Noah Fifita, Michael Salgado-Medina kick (Drive: 5 plays, 18 yards, 3:09; Arizona 21–17)
- (10:07) UTAH – Byrd Ficklin 4-yard pass from Devon Dampier, Dillon Curtis kick (Drive: 4 plays, 75 yards, 1:46; Utah 24–21)
- (3:22) ARIZ – Gio Richardson 19-yard pass from Noah Fifita, Michael Salgado-Medina kick (Drive: 5 plays, 99 yards, 2:25; Arizona 28–24)

Fourth quarter

- (14:10) UTAH – Dillon Curtis 39-yard field goal (Drive: 10 plays, 55 yards, 4:12; Arizona 28–27)
- (11:46) UTAH – Daniel Bray 8-yard run, two-point pass failed (Drive: 3 plays, 37 yards, 0:52; Utah 33–28)
- (8:09) ARIZ – Michael Salgado-Medina 47-yard field goal (Drive: 4 plays, -13 yards, 2:18; Utah 33–31)
- (3:13) ARIZ – Isaiah Mizell 10-yard pass from Noah Fifita, Noah Fifita run for two-point conversion (Drive: 5 plays, 91 yards, 2:26; Arizona 39–33)
- (2:35) UTAH – Creed Whittemore 70-yard pass from Devon Dampier, Dillon Curtis kick (Drive: 2 plays, 75 yards, 0:38; Utah 40–39)

Statistics	UTAH	ARIZ
First downs	20	21
Plays–yards	60–500	74–415
Rushes–yards	35–296	31–59
Passing yards	204	356
Passing: Comp–Att–Int	13–25–1	27–43–1
Turnovers	3	1
Time of possession	26:06	33:54

Team	Category	Player	Statistics
Utah	Passing	Devon Dampier	13/25, 204 yards, 2 TD, INT
Utah	Rushing	Daniel Bray	18 carries, 197 yards, TD
Utah	Receiving	Creed Whittemore	5 receptions, 92 yards, TD
Arizona	Passing	Noah Fifita	27/43, 356 yards, 3 TD, INT
Arizona	Rushing	Kedrick Reescano	9 carries, 41 yards, TD
Arizona	Receiving	Chris Hunter	6 receptions, 119 yards

=== at Kansas State ===
Uniform Combination
Helmet	Jersey	Pants

No. 19 Arizona Wildcats (7–3) at Kansas State Wildcats (4–6) – Game summary

Quarter	1	2	3	4	OT	Total
No. 19 Arizona	0	14	3	11	7	35
Kansas State	0	14	7	7	0	28

at Bill Snyder Family Football Stadium • Manhattan, KS

- Date: November 21, 2026
- Game time: 5:00 p.m.
- Game weather: Rain, 56 °F (13 °C)
- Game attendance: 49,807
- Referee: Stephen Baron
- TV announcers (FS1): Eric Collins (play-by-play) and Spencer Tillman (analyst)

Game information

First quarter

- No scoring plays

Second quarter

- (13:29) ARIZ – Noah Fifita 8-yard run, Michael Salgado-Medina kick (Drive: 8 plays, 43 yards, 4:02; Arizona 7–0)
- (9:01) KSU – Rodney Fields Jr. 3-yard run, Luis Rodriguez kick (Drive: 8 plays, 74 yards, 4:28; Tied 7–7)
- (3:59) ARIZ – Kedrick Reescano 1-yard run, Michael Salgado-Medina kick (Drive: 8 plays, 70 yards, 4:57; Arizona 14–7)
- (0:33) KSU – Derrick Salley Jr. 34-yard pass from Dillon Duff, Luis Rodriguez kick (Drive: 10 plays, 70 yards, 3:26; Tied 14–14)

Third quarter

- (11:01) ARIZ – Michael Salgado-Medina 33-yard field goal (Drive: 4 plays, 5 yards, 1:29; Arizona 17–14)
- (5:34) KSU – Dillon Duff 58-yard run, Luis Rodriguez kick (Drive: 4 plays, 78 yards, 1:49; Kansas State 21–17)

Fourth quarter

- (10:55) KSU – Wendell Gregory 0-yard fumble return, Luis Rodriguez kick (Kansas State 28–17)
- (6:03) ARIZ – Michael Salgado-Medina 26-yard field goal (Drive: 12 plays, 54 yards, 4:44; Kansas State 28–20)
- (1:52) ARIZ – Isaiah Mizell 35-yard pass from Noah Fifita, Noah Fifita two-point pass to Gio Richardson (Drive: 2 plays, 80 yards, 0:17; Tied 28–28)

Overtime

- ARIZ – Gio Richardson 25-yard pass from Noah Fifita, Michael Salgado-Medina kick (Drive: 2 plays, 25 yards; Arizona 35–28)

Statistics	ARIZ	KSU
First downs	20	15
Plays–yards	73–409	64–349
Rushes–yards	31–86	49–239
Passing yards	323	110
Passing: comp–att–int	29–42–0	7–15–1
Turnovers	2	1
Time of possession	31:41	28:19

Team	Category	Player	Statistics
Arizona	Passing	Noah Fifita	29/42, 323 yards, 2 TD
Arizona	Rushing	Noah Fifita	17 rushes, 58 yards, TD
Arizona	Receiving	Isaiah Mizell	5 receptions, 122 yards, TD
Kansas State	Passing	Dillon Duff	7/15, 110 yards, TD, INT
Kansas State	Rushing	Rodney Fields Jr.	28 rushes, 144 yards, TD
Kansas State	Receiving	Josh Manning	2 receptions, 39 yards

=== Arizona State ===
Arizona State Sun Devils (0–0) vs Arizona Wildcats (0–0) – Game summary

Quarter	1	2	3	4	Total
Sun Devils	0	0	0	0	0
Wildcats	0	0	0	0	0

at Casino Del Sol Stadium • Tucson, AZ

- Date: November 28, 2026
- Game time: 7:00 p.m.
- Game weather: -
- Game attendance: -
- Referee: -
- TV: FOX

Game information

First quarter
Second quarter
Third quarter
Fourth quarter

Statistics	ASU	ARIZ
First downs		
Plays–yards		
Rushes–yards		
Passing yards		
Passing: Comp–Att–Int		
Turnovers		
Time of possession		

Team	Category	Player	Statistics
Arizona State	Passing		
Arizona State	Rushing		
Arizona State	Receiving		
Arizona	Passing		
Arizona	Rushing		
Arizona	Receiving		

== Rankings ==
Ranking movements Legend: ██ Increase in ranking ██ Decrease in ranking RV = Received votes
	Week															
Poll	Pre	1	2	3	4	5	6	7	8	9	10	11	12	13	14	Final
AP	RV	RV	RV	RV	RV	RV	RV	25	22	24	22	19				
Coaches	RV	RV	RV	RV	RV	RV	RV	RV	21	22	21	20				
CFP	Not released									22	23	19				Not released

== Personnel ==
=== Roster ===
2026 Arizona Wildcats football team roster
Players
Coaches
Offense

Pos.	#	Name	Class
RB	0	Wesley Yarbrough	So
QB	1	Noah Fifita (C)	Sr
WR	2	RJ Mosley	Fr
RB	3	Kedrick Reescano	Sr
WR	4	DJ Jordan	So
WR	5	Gio Richardson	So
RB	6	Cornelius Warren III	So
QB	7	Sawyer Anderson	So
QB	9	Oscar Rios	Fr
WR	10	Jordan Ross	Jr
WR	11	Chris Hunter	Sr
WR	12	Tre Spivey III	Sr
TE	14	Cole Rusk	Sr
QB	15	Mason Bray	Jr
QB	16	Luke Haugo	So
WR	17	Isaiah Mizell	So
WR	18	Brandon Phelps	Jr
WR	20	Caleb Smith	Fr
RB	21	Ismail Mahdi	Sr
RB	24	Quincy Craig	Sr
RB	27	Lohgan Bottjer	Jr
RB	28	Anthony Wilhite	Sr
TE	39	Lachlan Teissier	So
RB	44	Antwan Roberts	Sr
OL	54	Keona Peat	Sr
OL	55	Nate Hale	Sr
OL	56	Sione Tohi	Fr
OL	58	Zach Henning	Sr
OL	59	Rhino Tapa'atoutai	Sr
OL	62	Javian Goo	So
OL	63	Alexander Doost	Sr
OL	67	Jaxon Griffin	So
OL	68	Malachi Joyner	Fr
OL	71	Tristan Bounds	Sr
OL	72	Louis Akpa	So
OL	73	Matthew Lado	Jr
OL	74	Justin Morales	Fr
OL	76	Khalil Sanogo	Fr
OL	77	Jake Griffin	Sr
OL	78	Grayson Stovall	Sr
OL	79	Issac Perez	Sr
TE	80	Shane King	So
WR	81	Scotty Brennan	So
WR	82	Landon Kelsey	Fr
TE	83	Tyler Mustain	Sr
WR	84	Rodney Gallagher III	Sr
TE	85	Kellan Ford	So
TE	86	Arthur Ban	Jr
TE	87	Tyler Powell	Sr
TE	88	Henry Gabalis	Fr
WR	89	Jordan McCord	Jr

Defense

Pos.	#	Name	Class
LB	0	Dash Fifita	Fr
DB	2	Daylen Martin	Sr
DL	3	Tre Smith	Sr
DB	4	Matai Tagoa'i	So
LB	6	Taye Brown	Sr
LB	7	Chase Kennedy	Sr
DB	8	Jay'Vion Cole	Sr
DB	9	Tyrese Boss	Jr
LB	10	Myron Robinson	So
LB	11	Jabari Mann	Jr
DB	12	Dwight Bootle II	Sr
DB	13	Cam Chapa	Jr
DB	14	Hannibal Navies	Fr
DB	15	Malcolm Hartzog	Sr
LB	16	Everett Roussaw Jr.	Sr
DB	17	Lee Molette III	Sr
LB	18	Carter Jones	So
LB	19	Max Harris	Sr
DB	20	Dajon Hamilton	So
DB	21	Johno Price	Sr
DB	23	Gavin Hunter	Sr
DB	24	Kingston Spivey	Fr
DB	25	Zuri Watson	Jr
DB	26	Coleman Patmon	So
DL	27	Keytrin Harris	Fr
DB	28	Swayde Griffin	So
LB	29	Jaden Parker	Fr
DB	30	Xaier Hiler	Fr
DB	31	Aiden Miller	Jr
LB	32	Nela Taliauli	Jr
DB	33	Kason Brown	So
DB	34	James Pike	Fr
DB	35	Quinn Olson	Jr
LB	36	Dominic Hanger	Sr
DL	38	Kevin Moorer	Jr
LB	39	Jacob Buggie	So
LB	40	Brandon Craddock	Sr
DL	41	Julian Savaiinaea	Sr
DL	42	Dominic Lolesio	Sr
DL	44	Prince Williams	Fr
DL	45	Victory Johnson	Sr
LB	48	Cooper Blomstrom	Sr
DL	51	Kaisi Lafitaga	Fr
DL	52	Dustin Petras	Fr
DL	53	Christian Madoski	Sr
LB	55	Leviticus Sua	Sr
DL	78	Manoah Faupusa	Fr
DL	91	Porter Patton	So
DL	95	Leroy Palu	Sr
DL	96	Zac Siulepa	Sr
DL	99	Mays Pese	So

Special teams

Pos.	#	Name	Class
PK	19	Michael Salgado-Medina	Jr
P	34	Carter Schwartz	Jr
P	37	Chase Ridley	So
LS	41	Drew Nicolson	Sr
LS	45	Braxton Hart	Fr
P/K	98	Ian French	Fr

Head coach

- Brent Brennan

Coordinators/assistant coaches

- Seth Doege – Offensive coordinator/Quarterbacks coach
- Danny Gonzales – Defensive coordinator
- Chip Vaney – Cornerbacks coach
- Josh Bringuel - Linebackers coach
- Lyle Moevao – Running backs coach
- Josh Oglesby – Offensive linemen coach/Run game coordinator
- Josh Miller – Tight ends coach
- Ronnie Palmer – Defensive ends coach – Edges
- Joe Salave'a – Associate HC/Defensive linemen coach
- Bobby Wade – Assistant HC/Wide receivers coach/Pass game coordinator
- Brett Arce – Safeties coach
- Craig Naivar – Special teams coordinator
- Quinn Thomas – Assistant Coach - Offense
- Greg Stewart – Assistant Coach - Offense
- Mike Williams – Assistant Coach - Offense
- Tyler Osborne – Assistant Coach - Offense
- Chuck Cecil – Senior Defensive analyst
- Jamie Feldermann – Assistant Coach - Defense
- Tariq Thompson – Assistant Coach - Defense
- Ronley Lakalaka – Assistant Coach - Defense
- Mike Nesbitt – Assistant Coach - Special teams
- Cullen Carroll – Director, Football strength & conditioning

Legend

- (C) Team captain
- (S) Suspended
- (I) Ineligible
- Injured
- Redshirt

Roster
Last update: 08/31/2026

=== Depth chart ===
- Depth chart is a projection and is subject to change.

Defense
4-3

FS
Quinn Olson
Cam Chapa
Matai Tagoa'i

Backer	Backer	Bear
Chase Kennedy	Taye Brown	Cooper Blomstrom
Everett Roussaw Jr.	Dash Fifita	Jabari Mann
-	Myron Robinson	-

B Kat
Gavin Hunter
Lee Molette III
-

CB
Jay'Vion Cole
Tyrese Boss
Swayde Griffin

DE	DT	DT	DE
Tre Smith	Leroy Palu	Mays Pese	Dominic Lolesio
Prince Williams	Kaisi Lafitaga	Kevin Moorer Jr.	Julian Savaiinaea
Victory Johnson	Zac Siulepa	Keytrin Harris	-

CB
Dwight Bootle II
Johno Price
Zuri Watson

Offense
Pro-style

WR
Tre Spivey
Brandon Phelps
RJ Mosley

WR
Chris Hunter III
Isaiah Mizell
DJ Jordan

LT	LG	C	RG	RT
Matthew Lado	Rhino Tapa'atoutai	Zach Henning	Alexander Doost	Tristan Bounds
Nathan Hale	Javian Goo	Grayson Stovall	Sione Tohi	Jake Griffin
-	-	-	-	Louis Akpa

TE
Cole Rusk
Tyler Powell
Shawn King
Arthur Ban

WR
Giovanni Richardson
Rodney Gallagher III
Caleb Smith

QB
Noah Fifita
Sawyer Anderson
Luke Haugo

Key reserves
Offense
Defense(DB) Malcolm Hartzog Jr.
Daylen Austin
Johno Price
Special teams
Out (indefinitely)
Out (season)
Out (suspended)
Out (retired)

RB
Kedrick Reescano
Quincy Craig
Antwan Roberts Jr.
Wesley Yarbrough

Special teams
PK Michael Salgado-Medina
PK Ian French
P Chase Ridley
P Carter Schwartz
KR Caleb Smith
Quincy Craig
Giovanni Richardson
Kedrick Reescano
PR Caleb Smith
Rodney Gallagher III
Giovanni Richardson
LS Drew Nicolson
Braxton Hart
H Carter Schwartz
Chase Ridley

True Freshman
Double Position : *
projected Depth Chart Week 1 vs Northern Arizona

== Statistics ==
=== Scoring ===
==== Arizona vs. non-conference opponents ====
	1	2	3	4	Total
Opponents	24	3	0	14	41
Arizona	21	41	21	27	110

==== Arizona vs. Big 12 opponents ====
	1	2	3	4	OT	Total
Big 12 opponents	20	69	49	61	0	199
Arizona	66	65	58	75	7	271

==== Arizona vs. all opponents ====
	1	2	3	4	OT	Total
Opponents	44	58	49	75	0	226
Arizona	87	106	79	102	7	381

== Awards and honors ==
=== Regular season honors ===
Big 12 Weekly Honors
Date	Player	Class	Position	Honors	Ref.
September 21	Noah Fifita	RS-Sr.	QB	Big 12 Offensive Player of the Week	
September 28	Caleb Smith	Fr.	WR	Big 12 Freshman Player of the Week	

National Weekly Honors
Date	Player	Class	Position	Honors	Source

=== Postseason honors ===
==== National awards ====
National Awards
Recipient	Award	Date awarded	Ref.

==== Big 12 Conference Individual Yearly awards ====
Big 12 Conference Individual Awards
Recipient	Award	Date awarded	Ref.

==== All-American honors ====
All-Big 12
Player	Position	1st/2nd team
HM = Honorable mention. Source:

All Big-12 Freshman
Player	Position
HM = Honorable mention. Source:

NCAA Recognized All-American Honors
Player	AP	AFCA	Athletic	Athlon	BR	CFN	CBS Sports	ESPN	FOX	FWAA	Phil Steele	TSN	SI	USAT	Walter Camp	Designation
The NCAA recognizes a selection to all five of the AFCA, FWAA and TSN first teams for unanimous selections and three of five for consensus selections. HM = Honorable mention. Source:

== After the season ==
=== NFL draft ===
The NFL draft will be held at National Mall in Washington, DC on April, 2027.

Wildcats who were picked in the 2027 NFL draft:

Round	Pick	Player	Position	NFL team
