= Daniel Bray (American football) =

American football player

No. 5 – Utah Utes
- Position: Running back
- Class: Sophomore

Personal information
- Listed height: 5 ft 10 in (1.78 m)
- Listed weight: 180 lb (82 kg)

Career information
- High school: North Crowley (Fort Worth, Texas)
- College: Utah (2025–present)
- Stats at ESPN

Daniel Bray is an American college football running back for the Utah Utes.

== Early life ==
Bray attended Abilene Cooper High School in Abilene, Texas for his first three seasons before transferring to North Crowley High School for his senior season. He finished his high school career with 2,674 rushing yards and 43 rushing touchdowns. Coming out of high school, Bray initially committed to play college football for the SMU Mustangs. Ultimately, he flipped his commitment to play for the Utah Utes.

== College career ==
In week 7 of the 2025 season, Bray rushed for 41 yards on five carries in a win over Arizona State. In week 8, he notched 121 yards and a touchdown on 10 carries versus rival BYU. Bray finished his freshman season in 2025 with 272 rushing yards and a touchdown on 40 carries and eight catches for 67 yards.

In week 3 of the 2026 season, Bray rushed for 82 yards and a touchdown in a victory against Utah State. In week nine, he ran eight times for 75 yards and a touchdown and caught two passes for 16 yards and a touchdown in a win over Cincinnati. In week 11, Bray rushed for 197 yards and a touchdown on 18 carries, while also hauling in three passes for 21 yards in a win over Arizona. For his performance he was named the Earl Campbell Tyler Rose Player of the Week.
