= Malcolm Hartzog =

American football player

No. 15 – Arizona Wildcats
- Position: Safety
- Class: Senior

Personal information
- Listed height: 5 ft 8 in (1.73 m)
- Listed weight: 187 lb (85 kg)

Career information
- High school: Jefferson Davis County (Bassfield, Mississippi)
- College: Nebraska (2022–2025); Arizona (2026–present)
- Stats at ESPN

Malcolm Hartzog Jr. is an American college football safety for the Arizona Wildcats.

== Early life ==
Hartzog attended high school at Jefferson Davis County located in Bassfield, Mississippi. Coming out of high school, he committed to play college football for the Nebraska Cornhuskers over offers from other schools such as Ole Miss, Southern Miss, and South Alabama.

== College career ==
In week five of the 2022 season, he made his first career start, where he notched a pass deflection and a fumble recovery which he returned 30 yards for a touchdown versus Indiana. He finished his freshman season in 2022, totaling 22 tackles, three interceptions, a fumble recovery, and a touchdown. During the 2023 season, Hartzog played in twelve games with ten starts, notching 40 tackles, with one and a half being for a loss, and six pass deflections. He finished the 2024 season, recording 45 tackles and four interceptions, where for his performance he was named honorable mention all Big-Ten. In week one of the 2025 season, Hartzog recorded the game-winning interception in a 20-17 win over Cincinnati.
