= Isaiah Mizell =

American football player

No. 17 – Arizona Wildcats
- Position: Wide receiver
- Class: Sophomore

Personal information
- Listed height: 6 ft 1 in (1.85 m)
- Listed weight: 170 lb (77 kg)

Career information
- High school: Boone (Orlando, Florida)
- College: Arizona (2025–present)
- Stats at ESPN

Isaiah Mizell is an American college football wide receiver for the Arizona Wildcats.

== Early life ==
Mizell attended William R. Boone High School in Orlando, Florida. As a junior, he recorded 49 receptions for 1,057 yards and 22 touchdowns. As a senior, he totaled 43 receptions for 1,038 yards and 15 touchdowns. Mizell committed to the University of Arizona to play college football.

== College career ==
As a freshman, Mizell recorded four receptions for 39 yards. He was expected to take on a larger role as a sophomore. Against West Virginia, Mizell hauled in six catches for 183 yards and two touchdowns.

=== Statistics ===
Season	Team	GP	Receiving			
Season	Team	GP	Rec	Yds	Avg	TD
2025	Arizona	9	4	39	9.8	0
2026	Arizona	9	40	753	18.8	7
Career		18	44	792	18.0	7
