= Noah Fifita =

American football player (born 2003)

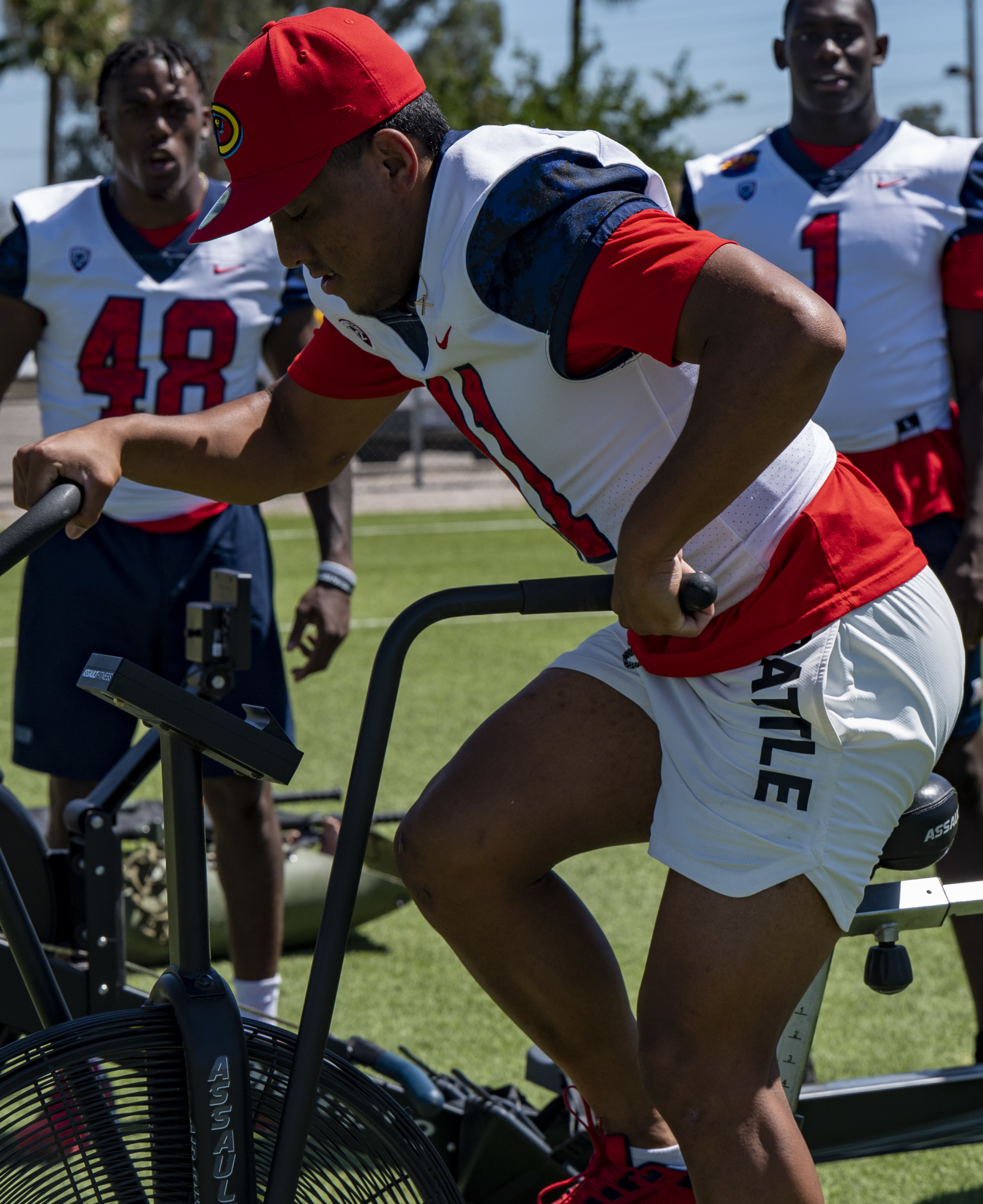
- Fifita in 2022

No. 1 – Arizona Wildcats
- Position: Quarterback
- Class: Redshirt Senior

Personal information
- Born: July 28, 2003 (age 23)
- Listed height: 5 ft 10 in (1.78 m)
- Listed weight: 190 lb (86 kg)

Career information
- High school: Servite (Anaheim, California)
- College: Arizona (2022–present)

Awards and highlights
- Pac-12 Offensive Freshman of the Year (2023); First-team All-Big 12 (2025)
- Stats at ESPN

Noah Malakai Fifita (born July 28, 2003) is an American college football quarterback for the Arizona Wildcats.

== Early life ==
Fifita attended Servite High School in Anaheim, California. During his senior season, MaxPreps ranked Fifita the 8th-best high school football quarterback nationally for the 2021 season. On April 4, 2021, Fifita committed to play college football at the University of Arizona, over offers from California, Colorado State, Fresno State, Hawaii, Idaho State, New Mexico, and Utah State. In his high school career, Fifita finished with 7,273 passing yards and 83 touchdowns, while also setting school records for career passing touchdowns, yards, and completions.

College recruiting
Name	Hometown	School	Height	Weight	Commit date
Noah Fifita; QB	Anaheim, California	Servite High School	5 ft 11 in (1.80 m)	175 lb (79 kg)	Apr 4, 2021
Noah Fifita; QB	Recruit ratings: Rivals: 247Sports: ESPN: (76)				
Overall recruit ranking:
Note: In many cases, Scout, Rivals, 247Sports, On3, and ESPN may conflict in their listings of height and weight.; In these cases, the average was taken. ESPN grades are on a 100-point scale.; Sources: "ESPN commits". ESPN.; "2022 Team Ranking". Rivals.com.

== College career ==
=== 2022 ===
Fifita played sparingly in his first season at Arizona, serving as the backup to Jayden de Laura. Fifita made his collegiate debut on September 10, near the end of the fourth quarter of a 39–17 home loss to Mississippi State. He completed 4 of 8 passes for 56 yards. Fifita threw his first career touchdown pass to high-school teammate Tetairoa McMillan in the fourth quarter of a 45–20 road loss to #14 Utah.

=== 2023 ===
Fifita began 2023 as a backup but stepped up in Week 4 after Jayden de Laura got injured, leading Arizona to a narrow win over Stanford. He impressed in his first start against #7 Washington, throwing for 232 yards and three touchdowns, followed by a strong performance against #9 USC with over 300 yards and five touchdowns, earning Pac-12 Freshman of the Week honors. Fifita won the award again after winning his first game as a starter the following week in a 44–6 rout of #19 Washington State in Pullman, Washington.

After a bye week, Fifita started against #11 Oregon State, despite de Laura's recovery, and led Arizona to a 27–24 upset win with 275 yards and three touchdowns, earning his third Pac-12 Freshman of the Week award in October. The following week, Fifita threw for 300 yards and three touchdowns in a win over #19 UCLA, making Arizona bowl-eligible and securing the program's first-ever three-game win streak against AP Top 25 teams. After beating Colorado on the road, Fifita led a 42–18 rout of #22 Utah, as he finished with a QBR rating of 97.6. Against Arizona State, he broke the single-game school record with 527 yards and five touchdowns in a 59–23 victory, improving their win streak to six games.

On December 5, Fifita was named the Pac-12 Offensive Freshman of the Year, becoming the second player in school history to earn the award, joining J. J. Taylor. Against #12 Oklahoma in the Alamo Bowl, Fifita threw for 354 yards and two touchdowns in a 38–24 comeback victory, concluding the season on a seven-game winning streak and securing the Wildcats' fourth ten-win season in program history. Fifita finished the season tied for fourth in completion percentage (72.4) among qualified quarterbacks, as well as the fifth-most passing yards (2,869), second-most touchdown passes (25), second-fewest interceptions (6), and highest rating (165.9) among qualified freshman quarterbacks in the FBS.

=== 2024 ===
Despite the departure of head coach Jedd Fisch, Fifita announced that he would return to Arizona for the 2024 season. In the season opener against New Mexico, Fifita threw for 422 yards with four touchdown passes in a 61–39 victory. After winning against Northern Arizona, Fifita and the Wildcats saw their nation-best nine-game winning streak come to an end on the road against #14 Kansas State. Fifita threw for 268 yards on 26-of-42 passing but was intercepted once and had zero touchdowns as they lost 31–7.

Following a bye week, Fifita threw for 197 yards and two touchdowns against #10 Utah, including key third-down completions of 41 and 35 yards during a touchdown drive in the fourth quarter that kept the Wildcats ahead, winning 23–10 in Rice–Eccles Stadium.

=== College statistics ===
Year	Team	Games			Passing								Rushing			
Year	Team	GP	GS	Record	Cmp	Att	Pct	Yds	Y/A	TD	Int	Rtg	Att	Yds	Avg	TD
2022	Arizona	3	0	—	9	19	47.4	128	6.7	1	0	121.3	0	0	0.0	0
2023	Arizona	12	9	7–2	241	333	72.4	2,869	8.6	25	6	165.9	38	−33	−0.9	0
2024	Arizona	12	12	4–8	260	430	60.5	2,958	6.9	18	12	126.5	66	17	0.3	1
2025	Arizona	13	13	9–4	275	428	64.3	3,228	7.5	29	6	147.2	114	216	1.9	3
2026	Arizona	11	11	8–3	280	392	71.4	3,473	8.9	26	6	164.7	97	177	1.8	5
Career		51	45	28−17	1,065	1,602	66.5	12,656	7.9	99	30	149.5	315	377	1.2	9

== Personal life ==
Fifita is of Tongan and Filipino descent.
