= 2026 Kansas Jayhawks football team =

American college football season

2026 Kansas Jayhawks football
- Conference: Big 12 Conference
- Record: 4–7 (2–6 Big 12)
- Head coach: Lance Leipold (6th season)
- Offensive coordinator: Andy Kotelnicki (4th season)
- Co-offensive coordinator: Matt Lubick (2nd season)
- Offensive scheme: Pro spread
- Defensive coordinator: D. K. McDonald (2nd season)
- Base defense: 4–2–5
- Home stadium: David Booth Kansas Memorial Stadium

2026 Big 12 Conference football standings
	Conf.			Overall
Team	W		L	W		L
No. 2 Utah y	8	–	0	11	–	0
No. 12 Texas Tech	7	–	1	10	–	1
No. 10 BYU	6	–	2	9	–	2
No. 19 Arizona	5	–	3	8	–	3
No. 20 Houston	5	–	3	8	–	3
Oklahoma State	5	–	3	7	–	4
Baylor	4	–	4	6	–	5
Arizona State	4	–	4	6	–	5
UCF	4	–	4	6	–	5
Iowa State	3	–	5	5	–	6
TCU	3	–	5	5	–	6
Cincinnati	3	–	5	6	–	5
Kansas	2	–	6	4	–	7
West Virginia	2	–	6	5	–	6
Colorado	2	–	6	4	–	7
Kansas State	1	–	7	4	–	7
Championship: TBD vs. Utah
^ – College Football Playoff participant; $ – Conference champion; y – Championship game participant; As of November 22, 2026; Rankings from CFP rankings

The 2026 Kansas Jayhawks football team is who represents the University of Kansas as they are a member of the Big 12 Conference during the 2026 NCAA Division I FBS football season. This is the Jayhawks' 137th season. The Jayhawks play their home games at David Booth Kansas Memorial Stadium which is located in Lawrence, Kansas. They are led by their sixth-year head coach Lance Leipold.

== Offseason ==
=== Starters lost ===
Starters are based on starters from the final game of the 2025 season. The players listed below have run out of eligibility. In total, the Jayhawks program had 15 players run out of eligibility.

Name	Position
Bangally Kamara	LB
Emmanuel Henderson	WR
Leshon Williams	RB
Jalon Daniels	QB
Daniel Hishaw Jr.	RB
Levi Wentz	WR
Bryson Canty	WR
Devin Dye	S
Justice Finkley	DE
Finn Lappin	P
Bryce Foster	C
Enrique Cruz Jr.	OT
Tommy Dunn Jr.	DT
Boden Groen	TE
Laith Marjan	K

=== Transfer portal ===
Incoming

Name	Position	Old school
Jibreel Al-Amin	LB	Marshall
Jailen Butler	TE	Old Dominion
Elijah Cannon	CB	Mississippi State
Kasen Carpenter	IOL	Oklahoma State
Jibriel Conde	DL	Grand Valley State
Martin Connington	K	Michigan State
Nahzae Cox	WR	Middle Tennessee
Bam Crouch	LB	Boston College
KhiJohnn Cummings-Coleman	CB	Iowa State
Quincy Davis	LB	New Mexico State
Jalen Dupree	RB	Colorado State
Dylan Edwards	RB	Kansas State
Corey Gordon	S	Louisville
Jaden Harris	S	Georgia
Chase Jenkins	QB	Rice
Trezelle Jenkins	IOL	Wayne State
Trevon McAlpine	DL	Tulane
Nik McMillan	WR	Buffalo
Rino Monteforte	LS	California
Nick Morrow	OT	California
Carter Moses	TE	Albany
Kevin Oatis	DL	Arkansas
Roman Pearson	S	Ball State
Christian Pritchett	S	Georgia Tech
David Santiago	EDGE	Michigan State
Eamon Smalls	DL	UAB
Brandon Solis	OT	Missouri
Connor Stroh	IOL	Texas
Landyn Watson	EDGE	Kentucky
Jaron Willis	LB	South Carolina
Yasin Willis	RB	Syracuse

Outgoing

Name	Position	New school
Kene Anene	OT	North Dakota State
Logan Brantley	LB	Boise State
Dylan Brooks	EDGE	Missouri State
Bryce Cohoon	WR	South Dakota
Jameel Croft	CB	Charlotte
Jacoby Davis	CB	Unknown
Jaidyn Doss	WR	Northwest Missouri State
Devin Dye	S	Unknown
Jalen Dye	S	Unknown
Aundre Gibson	CB	Northern Arizona
Greydon Grimes	OT	Appalachian State
Jaden Hamm	TE	Arkansas State
Efren Jasso	P	Incarnate Word
Jon Jon Kamara	LB	Wisconsin
Carter Lavrusky	OT	Northern Arizona
Dillon Marshall	S	Northern Iowa
Damani Maxson	S	Prairie View A&M
David McComb	QB	Miami (OH)
Tyler Mercer	IOL	Oklahoma State
Dean Miller	EDGE	Unknown
Lyrik Rawls	S	Arizona State
Caleb Redd	EDGE	Eastern Kentucky
Laquan Robinson	S	Southern Miss
Joseph Sipp	LB	Florida Atlantic
Harry Stewart	RB	Boise State
Jacorey Stewart	LB	FIU
Johnny Thompson Jr.	RB	Ball State

== Schedule ==
Date	Time	Opponent	Site	TV	Result	Attendance
September 4	7:00 p.m.	LIU*	David Booth Kansas Memorial Stadium; Lawrence, KS	ESPNU	W 51–6	30,904
September 11	7:00 p.m.	No. 23 Missouri*	David Booth Kansas Memorial Stadium; Lawrence, KS (Border War)	FOX	L 21–38	32,000
September 19	11:00 a.m.	vs. Arizona State	Wembley Stadium; London, England (Union Jack Classic / Big Noon Kickoff)	FS1	L 17–24	46,523
October 3	11:00 a.m.	Middle Tennessee*	David Booth Kansas Memorial Stadium; Lawrence, KS	ESPNU	W 55–0	32,000
October 10	7:00 p.m.	at No. 12 Utah	Rice–Eccles Stadium; Salt Lake City, UT	ESPNews/ESPN	L 24–41	51,467
October 17	11:00 a.m.	at Kansas State	Bill Snyder Family Football Stadium; Manhattan, KS (Sunflower Showdown)	FS1	L 24–35	51,961
October 24	12:00 p.m.	Baylor^{†}	David Booth Kansas Memorial Stadium; Lawrence, KS	TNT	W 25–24	32,000
October 31	2:30 p.m.	at TCU	Amon G. Carter Stadium; Fort Worth, TX	FS1	L 16–22	32,549
November 7	2:45 p.m.	UCF	David Booth Kansas Memorial Stadium; Lawrence, KS	ESPN2	L 32–33	31,008
November 14	2:30 p.m.	at West Virginia	Milan Puskar Stadium; Morgantown, WV	ESPN2	W 37–14	45,629
November 21	11:00 a.m.	No. 10 BYU	David Booth Kansas Memorial Stadium; Lawrence, KS	ABC	L 29–31 ^{3OT}	30,121
November 28	5:15 p.m.	at Oklahoma State	Boone Pickens Stadium; Stillwater, OK	ESPN2		
*Non-conference game; ^{†}Homecoming; Rankings from AP Poll (and CFP Rankings, after November 3) – Released prior to game; All times are in Central time

== Game summaries ==
=== vs. LIU (FCS) ===
LIU Sharks (FCS) (0–1) at Kansas Jayhawks (0–0) – Game summary

Quarter	1	2	3	4	Total
Sharks (FCS)	0	0	0	6	6
Jayhawks	6	24	7	14	51

at David Booth Kansas Memorial Stadium • Lawrence, Kansas

- Date: September 4
- Game time: 7:00 p.m.
- Game weather: Sunny • Temperature: 94 °F (34 °C) • Wind: S 7 mph
- Game attendance: 30,904
- Referee: Cravonne Barrett
- TV announcers (ESPNU): Mark Neely and Jeff Woody

Game information

First quarter

- KU – Yasin Willis with a 5-yard run (pass failed), 5:59. Jayhawks 6–0. Drive: 9 plays, 70 yards, 4:08.

Second quarter

- KU – Martin Connington kicks a 32-yard field goal, 9:46. Jayhawks 9–0. Drive: 16 plays, 76 yards, 6:30.
- KU – Yasin Willis 10-yard run (Martin Connington kick), 6:10. Jayhawks 16–0. Drive: 4 plays, 68 yards, 1:59.
- KU – Jalen Dupree 3-yard run (Martin Connington kick), 3:50. Jayhawks 23–0. Drive: 3 plays, 57 yards, 0:48.
- KU – Nik McMillan 19-yard pass from Isaiah Marshall (Martin Connington kick), 0:57. Jayhawks 30–0. Drive: 5 plays, 64 yards, 1:03.

Third quarter

- KU – Tate Nagy 6-yard pass from Isaiah Marshall (Martin Connington kick), 8:13. Jayhawks 37–0. Drive: 15 plays, 72 yards, 6:47.

Fourth quarter

- KU – Micah Johnson 8-yard run (Martin Connington kick), 14:19. Jayhawks 44–0. Drive: 10 plays, 67 yards, 4:53.
- LIU – Will Johnson 39-yard field goal, 10:09. Jayhawks 44–3. Drive: 7 plays, 53 yards, 4:10.
- KU – Donald Collier 3-yard run (Martin Connington kick), 7:22. Jayhawks 51–3. Drive: 6 plays, 74 yards, 2:47.
- LIU – Will Johnson 39-yard field goal, 1:56. Jayhawks 51–6. Drive: 8 plays, 13 yards, 3:54.

Statistics	LIU	KU
First downs	11	29
Plays–yards	53–146	76–613
Rushes–yards	33–35	51–277
Passing yards	111	336
Passing: comp–att–int	10–20–0	18–25–0
Turnovers	1	1
Time of possession	26:54	33:06

Team	Category	Player	Statistics
LIU	Passing	Luca Stanzani	10/19, 111 yards
LIU	Rushing	Luca Stanzani	12 carries, 20 yards
LIU	Receiving	Josiah Brown	3 receptions, 47 yards
Kansas	Passing	Isaiah Marshall	14/19, 246 yards, 2 TD
Kansas	Rushing	Yasin Willis	11 carries, 72 yards, 2 TD
Kansas	Receiving	Nik McMillan	6 receptions, 130 yards, TD

=== vs. No. 23 Missouri (Border War) ===
No. 23 Missouri Tigers (1–0) at Kansas Jayhawks (1–0) – Game summary

Quarter	1	2	3	4	Total
No. 23 Tigers	0	14	14	10	38
Jayhawks	0	14	7	0	21

at David Booth Kansas Memorial Stadium • Lawrence, Kansas

- Date: September 11
- Game time: 7:00 p.m.
- Game weather: Sunny • Temperature: 82 °F (28 °C) • Wind: SE 5 mph
- Game attendance: 32,000
- Referee: Jason Autrey
- TV announcers (FOX): Tim Brando, Devin Gardner and Josh Sims

Game information

First quarter

- No scoring plays.

Second quarter

- (7:16) KU: Austin Alexander 88-yard return of blocked field goal (Martin Connington kick) (Drive: 11 plays, 55 yards, 4:56; Kansas 7–0)
- (5:22) MIZ: Jamal Roberts with a 64-yard run (Blake Craig kick) (Drive: 4 plays, 75 yards, 1:54; Tied 7–7)
- (1:48) KU: Nik McMillan 20-yard pass from Isaiah Marshall (Martin Connington kick) (Drive: 10 plays, 75 yards, 3:34; Kansas 14–7)
- (0:30) MIZ: Cayden Lee 27-yard pass from Austin Simmons (Blake Craig kick) (Drive: 7 plays, 75 yards, 1:18; Tied 14–14)

Third quarter

- (11:40) MIZ: Donovan Olugbobe 8-yard pass from Austin Simmons (Blake Craig kick) (Drive: 5 plays, 34 yards, 2:05; Missouri 21–14)
- (10:52) MIZ: Xai'Shaun Edwards 10-yard run (Blake Craig kick) (Drive: 2 plays, 12 yards, 0:36; Missouri 28–14)
- (2:07) KU: Nahzae Cox 10-yard pass from Isiah Marshall (Martin Connington kick) (Drive: 11 plays, 83 yards, 5:38; Missouri 28–21)

Fourth quarter

- (11:46) MIZ: Blake Craig kicks a 32-yard field goal (Drive: 10 plays, 61 yards, 5:21; Missouri 31–14)
- (2:02) MIZ: Brett Norfleet 13-yard pass from Austin Simmons (Blake Craig kick) (Drive: 4 plays, 14 yards, 1:22; Missouri 38–21)

Statistics	MIZ	KU
First downs	21	18
Plays–yards	71–469	67–255
Rushes–yards	41–177	36–81
Passing yards	292	174
Passing: comp–att–int	19–30–0	14–31–2
Turnovers	1	3
Time of possession	31:21	28:39

Team	Category	Player	Statistics
Missouri	Passing	Austin Simmons	19/29, 292 yards, 3 TD
Missouri	Rushing	Jamal Roberts	28 carries, 125 yards, TD
Missouri	Receiving	Donovan Olugbode	6 receptions, 121 yards, TD
Kansas	Passing	Isaiah Marshall	13/30, 168 yards, 2 TD, 2 INT
Kansas	Rushing	Dylan Edwards	6 carries, 39 yards
Kansas	Receiving	Nik McMillan	2 receptions, 52 yards, TD

=== vs. Arizona State ===
This was the first-ever game in the Union Jack Classic, broadcast on Big Noon Kickoff.

Arizona State Sun Devils (1–1) vs. Kansas Jayhawks (1–1) – Game summary
Union Jack Classic

Quarter	1	2	3	4	Total
Sun Devils	3	7	7	7	24
Jayhawks	0	7	0	10	17

at Wembley Stadium • London, England

- Date: September 19
- Game time: 5:10 p.m. BST
- Game weather: Rain • Temperature: 66 °F (19 °C) • Wind: SW at 10 miles per hour (16 km/h)
- Game attendance: 46,523
- Referee: Kevin Boitman
- TV announcers (FS1): Connor Onion, Robert Griffin III and Alexa Landestoy
- Report: Official report

Game information

First quarter

- ASU – Carson Smith 39-yard field goal, 9:22. Arizona State 3–0. Drive: 10 plays, 44 yards, 3:50.

Second quarter

- KAN – Tate Nagy 72-yard punt return (Martin Connington kick), 10:27. Kansas 7–3. Drive: 3 plays, -1 yard, 1:54.
- ASU – Reed Harris 25-yard pass from Cutter Boley (Carson Smith kick), 0:20. Arizona State 10–7. Drive: 1 play, 25 yards, 0:05.

Third quarter

- ASU – Jaren Hamilton 100-yard kick return (Carson Smith kick), 14:46. Arizona State 17–7. Drive: 0 plays, 0 yards, 0:00.

Fourth quarter

- ASU – Cutter Boley 1-yard run (Carson Smith kick), 12:30. Arizona State 24–7. Drive: 2 plays, 2 yards, 1:04.
- KAN – Tate Nagy 38-yard pass from Isaiah Marshall (Martin Connington kick), 6:52. Arizona State 24–14. Drive: 5 plays, 67 yard, 1:15.
- KAN – Martin Connington 46-yard field goal, 3:51. Arizona State 24–17. Drive: 8 plays, 52 yards, 1:23.

Statistics	ASU	KU
First downs	13	22
Plays–yards	66–228	74–414
Rushes–yards	43–133	41–179
Passing yards	95	235
Passing: comp–att–int	11–23–0	17–33–1
Time of possession	30:42	29:18

Team	Category	Player	Statistics
Arizona State	Passing	Cutter Boley	11/23, 95 yards, TD
Arizona State	Rushing	Kyson Brown	24 carries, 81 yards
Arizona State	Receiving	Reed Harris	4 receptions, 48 yards, TD
Kansas	Passing	Isaiah Marshall	17/33, 235 yards, TD, INT
Kansas	Rushing	Dylan Edwards	18 carries, 89 yards
Kansas	Receiving	Nik McMillan	4 receptions, 44 yards

=== vs. Middle Tennessee ===
Middle Tennessee Blue Raiders (2–2) at Kansas Jayhawks (1–2) – Game summary

Quarter	1	2	3	4	Total
Blue Raiders	0	0	0	0	0
Jayhawks	3	17	14	21	55

at David Booth Kansas Memorial Stadium • Lawrence, Kansas

- Date: October 3
- Game time: 11:00 a.m.
- Game weather: Sunny • Temperature: 63 °F (17 °C) • Wind: SE at 7 miles per hour (11 km/h)
- Game attendance: 32,000
- Referee: Tutashinda Salaam
- TV announcers (ESPNU): Mark Neely and Jay Walker
- Report: Official report

Game information
First quarter
- KU – Martin Connington 43-yard field goal, 6:03. Jayhawks 3–0. Drive: 10 plays, 55 yards, 4:47.

Second quarter

- KU – Dylan Edwards 6-yard run (Martin Connington kick), 13:13. Jayhawks 10–0. Drive: 13 plays, 75 yards, 5:48.
- KU – Dylan Edwards 5-yard run (Martin Connington kick), 4:23. Jayhawks 17–0. Drive: 5 plays, 60 yards, 2:07.
- KU – Martin Connington 35-yard field goal, 0:11. Jayhawks 20–0. Drive: 9 plays, 43 yards, 2:12.

Third quarter

- KU – Dylan Edwards 12-yard run (Martin Connington kick), 12:20. Jayhawks 27–0. Drive: 6 plays, 48 yards, 2:39.
- KU – Nahzae Cox 34-yard pass from Isaiah Marshall (Martin Connington kick), 3:47. Jayhawks 34–0. Drive: 6 plays, 91 yards, 3:10.

Fourth quarter

- KU – Jalen Dupree 5-yard run (Martin Connington kick), 12:21. Jayhawks 41–0. Drive: 10 plays, 58 yards, 5:40.
- KU – Chase Jenkins 14-yard run (Martin Connington kick), 8:35. Jayhawks 48–0. Drive: 5 plays, 91 yards, 2:48.
- KU – Khijohnn Cummings-Coleman 24-yard run (Martin Connington kick), 5:22. Jayhawks 55–0. Drive: 4 plays, 71 yards, 2:12.

Statistics	MTSU	KU
First downs	7	36
Plays–yards	42–136	83–706
Rushes–yards	16–55	58–480
Passing yards	81	226
Passing: comp–att–int	9–26–0	16–25–0
Turnovers	1	0
Time of possession	19:05	40:55

Team	Category	Player	Statistics
Middle Tennessee	Passing	Roman Gagliano	9/26, 81 yards
Middle Tennessee	Rushing	Antonio Martin Jr.	8 carries, 40 yards
Middle Tennessee	Receiving	Ziyon Butler	2 receptions, 44 yards
Kansas	Passing	Isaiah Marshall	13/22, 161 yards, TD
Kansas	Rushing	Dylan Edwards	20 carries, 137 yards, 3 TD
Kansas	Receiving	Bryson Hayes	3 receptions, 50 yards

=== at No. 12 Utah ===
Kansas Jayhawks (2–2) at No. 12 Utah Utes (4–0) – Game summary

Quarter	1	2	3	4	Total
Jayhawks	0	17	7	0	24
No. 12 Utes	14	7	6	14	41

at Rice–Eccles Stadium • Salt Lake City, Utah

- Date: October 10
- Game time: 7:00 p.m.
- Game weather: Cloudy • Temperature: 70 °F (21 °C) • Wind: S at 7 miles per hour (11 km/h)
- Game attendance: 51,467
- Referee: Michael McCabe
- TV announcers (ESPNews): Roy Philpott, Brock Osweiler and Sherree Burruss
- Report: Official report

Game information
First quarter
- UTAH – Wayshawn Parker 5-yard run (Dillon Curtis kick), 9:21. Utes 7–0. Drive: 10 plays, 75 yards, 5:39.
- UTAH – Devon Dampier 12-yard run (Dillon Curtis kick), 6:19. Utes 14–0. Drive: 3 plays, 66 yards, 1:19.

Second quarter

- KU – Dylan Edwards 3-yard pass from Isaiah Marshall (Martin Connington kick), 14:09. Utes 14–7. Drive: 3 plays, 7 yards, 1:18.
- UTAH – Noah Bennee 6-yard pass from Devon Dampier (Dillon Curtis kick), 10:16. Utes 21–7. Drive: 7 plays, 75 yards, 3:53.
- KU – Isaiah Marshall 6-yard run (Martin Connington kick), 0:42. Utes 21–14. Drive: 5 plays, 66 yards, 0:27.
- KU – Martin Connington 34-yard field goal, 0:00. Utes 21–17. Drive: 5 plays, 48 yards, 0:34.

Third quarter

- UTAH – Ricky Johnson 2-yard pass from Devon Dampier, 5:13. Utes 27–17. Drive: 15 plays, 82 yards, 7:24.
- KU – Nik McMillan 29-yard pass from Isaiah Marshall (Martin Connington kick), 0:27. Utes 27–24. Drive: 9 plays, 75 yards, 4:46.

Fourth quarter

- UTAH – Semi Taulanga 1-yard pass from Devon Dampier (Dillon Curtis kick), 10:45. Utes 34–24. Drive: 9 plays, 75 yards, 4:42.
- UTAH – Wayshawn Parker 90-yard run (Dillon Curtis kick), 7:13. Utes 41–24. Drive: 3 plays, 99 yards, 1:18.

Statistics	KU	UTAH
First downs	19	31
Plays–yards	58–391	78–545
Rushes–yards	21–58	47–287
Passing yards	333	258
Passing: comp–att–int	19–37–1	24–31–1
Time of possession	20:56	39:04

Team	Category	Player	Statistics
Kansas	Passing	Isaiah Marshall	19/37, 333 yards, 2 TD, 1 INT
Kansas	Rushing	Dylan Edwards	9 carries, 22 yards
Kansas	Receiving	Cam Pickett	8 receptions, 134 yards
Utah	Passing	Devon Dampier	23/30, 238 yards, 3 TD, 1 INT
Utah	Rushing	Wayshawn Parker	16 carries, 171 yards, 2 TD
Utah	Receiving	Ricky Johnson	5 receptions, 104 yards, 1 TD

=== at Kansas State (Sunflower Showdown) ===
Kansas Jayhawks (2–3) at Kansas State Wildcats (3–2) – Game summary

Quarter	1	2	3	4	Total
Jayhawks	17	0	7	0	24
Wildcats	7	11	7	10	35

at Bill Snyder Family Football Stadium • Manhattan, Kansas

- Date: October 17
- Game time: 11:00 a.m.
- Game weather: Sunny • Temperature: 49 °F (9 °C) • Wind: S at 7 miles per hour (11 km/h)
- Game attendance: 51,961
- Referee: Michael VanderVelde
- TV announcers (FS1): Eric Collins (play-by-play) and Spencer Tillman (analyst)
- Report: Official report

Game information
First quarter
- KSU – Rodney Fields Jr. 4-yard run (Luis Rodriguez kick), 13:17. Wildcats 7–0. Drive: 5 plays, 75 yards, 1:43.
- KU – Bryson Hayes 95-yard kickoff return (Martin Connington kick), 13:04. Tied 7–7.
- KU – Nik McMillan 12-yard pass from Isaiah Marshall (Martin Connington kick), 4:21. Jayhawks 14–7. Drive: 13 plays, 88 yards, 5:03.
- KU – Martin Connington 31-yard field goal, 0:51. Jayhawks 17–7. Drive: 5 plays, 14 yards, 2:29.

Second quarter

- KSU – Luis Rodriguez 22-yard field goal, 11:50. Jayhawks 17–10. Drive: 9 plays, 71 yards, 3:56.
- KSU – Luis Rodriguez 51-yard field goal, 6:57. Jayhawks 17–13. Drive: 7 plays, 32 yards, 3:27.
- KSU – Matthew Gill safety, 1:39. Jayhawks 17–15.
- KSU – Luis Rodriguez 28-yard field goal, 0:24. Wildcats 18–17. Drive: 8 plays, 41 yards, 1:09.

Third quarter

- KU – Dylan Edwards 3-yard run (Martin Connington kick), 11:05. Jayhawks 24–18. Drive: 9 plays, 75 yards, 3:55.
- KSU – Joe Jackson 8-yard run (Luis Rodriguez kick), 6:32. Wildcats 25–24. Drive: 9 plays, 65 yards, 4:33.
- KSU – Jaron Tibbs 9-yard pass from Avery Johnson (Luis Rodriguez kick), 8:28. Wildcats 32–24. Drive: 4 plays, 84 yards, 1:25.
- KSU – Luis Rodriguez 34-yard field goal, 1:56. Wildcats 35–24. Drive: 11 plays, 63 yards, 5:10.

Statistics	KU	KSU
First downs	18	25
Plays–yards	60–319	75–568
Rushes–yards	34–168	51–359
Passing yards	151	209
Passing: comp–att–int	12–26–1	14–24–0
Time of possession	23:47	36:13

Team	Category	Player	Statistics
Kansas	Passing	Isaiah Marshall	12/26, 151 yards, 1 TD, 1 INT
Kansas	Rushing	Isaiah Marshall	14 carries, 117 yards
Kansas	Receiving	Nik McMillan	5 receptions, 55 yards, 1 TD
Kansas State	Passing	Avery Johnson	14/24, 209 yards, 1 TD
Kansas State	Rushing	Joe Jackson	27 carries, 159 yards, 1 TD
Kansas State	Receiving	Derrick Salley Jr.	2 receptions, 70 yards

=== vs. Baylor ===
Baylor Bears (4–2) at Kansas Jayhawks (2–4) – Game summary

Quarter	1	2	3	4	Total
Bears	0	0	0	0	0
Jayhawks	0	0	0	0	0

at David Booth Kansas Memorial Stadium • Lawrence, Kansas

- Date: October 24
- Game time: 12:00 p.m.
- Game attendance: 32,000
- TV: TNT

Statistics	BAY	KU
First downs		
Plays–yards		
Rushes–yards		
Passing yards		
Passing: comp–att–int		
Time of possession		

Team	Category	Player	Statistics
Baylor	Passing		
Baylor	Rushing		
Baylor	Receiving		
Kansas	Passing		
Kansas	Rushing		
Kansas	Receiving		

=== at TCU ===
Kansas Jayhawks (3–4) at TCU Horned Frogs (3–4) – Game summary

Quarter	1	2	3	4	Total
Jayhawks	0	0	0	0	0
Horned Frogs	0	0	0	0	0

at Amon G. Carter Stadium • Fort Worth, Texas

- Date: October 31
- Game time: 2:30 p.m.
- Game attendance: 32,549
- TV announcers (FS1): Carlo Jiménez play-by-play & Spencer Tillman analyst

Statistics	KU	TCU
First downs		
Plays–yards		
Rushes–yards		
Passing yards		
Passing: comp–att–int		
Time of possession		

Team	Category	Player	Statistics
Kansas	Passing		
Kansas	Rushing		
Kansas	Receiving		
TCU	Passing		
TCU	Rushing		
TCU	Receiving		

=== vs. UCF ===
UCF Knights (4–4) at Kansas Jayhawks (3–5) – Game summary

Quarter	1	2	3	4	Total
Knights	3	9	14	7	33
Jayhawks	7	0	7	18	32

at David Booth Kansas Memorial Stadium • Lawrence, Kansas

- Date: November 7
- Game time: 2:45 p.m.
- Game weather: Mostly sunny • Temperature: 53 °F (12 °C)
- Game attendance: 31,008
- Referee: Tutashinda Salaam
- TV announcers (ESPN2): Courtney Lyle (play-by-play) and Rene Ingoglia (analyst)

Game information

First quarter

- KU – Isaiah Marshall 1-yard run (Martin Connington Kick), 10:25, Jayhawks 7–0. Drive: 4 plays, 3 yards, 2:01.
- UCF – Will Stone 37-yard field goal, 6:21, Jayhawks 7–3. Drive: 9 plays, 46 yards, 4:04.

Second quarter

- UCF – Duane Thomas Jr. 10-yard run (Will Stone kick failed), 12:03, Knights 9–7. Drive: 9 plays, 65 yards, 4:23.
- UCF – Will Stone 23-yard field goal, 5:55, Knights 12–7. Drive: 11 plays, 51 yards, 5:08.

Third quarter

- UCF – Taevion Swint 1-yard run (Will Stone kick), 11:56, Knights 19–7. Drive: 6 plays, 50 yards, 2:57.
- UCF – Josh Derry 44-yard pass from Alonza Barnett III (Will Stone kick), 9:52, Knights 26–7. Drive: 2 plays, 46 yards, 0:49.
- KU – Isaiah Marshall 30-yard run (Martin Connington Kick), 4:17, Knights 26–14. Drive: 10 plays, 75 yards, 5:35.

Fourth quarter

- KU – Khijohnn Cummings-Coleman 1-yard run (Martin Connington Kick), 11:26, Knights 26–21. Drive: 14 plays, 80 yards, 6:12.
- KU – Martin Connington 34-yard field goal, 5:29, Knights 26–24. Drive: 8 plays, 58 yards, 3:37.
- KU – Dylan Edwards 2-yard run (Isaiah Marshall pass to Nik McMillan), 1:06, Jayhawks 32–26. Drive: 11 plays, 95 yards, 1:21.
- UCF – Caden Piening 6-yard pass from Alonza Barnett III (Will Stone kick), 0:01, Knights 33–32. Drive: 10 plays, 73 yards, 1:00.

Statistics	UCF	KU
First downs	23	19
Plays–yards	68–358	71–404
Rushes–yards	37–107	39–194
Passing yards	251	210
Passing: comp–att–int	18–31–1	21–32–0
Time of possession	30:34	29:26

Team	Category	Player	Statistics
UCF	Passing	Alonza Barnett III	18/31, 133 yards, 2 TD, INT
UCF	Rushing	Landen Chambers	13 carries, 40 yards
UCF	Receiving	Josh Derry	8 receptions, 143 yards, TD
Kansas	Passing	Isaiah Marshall	21/32, 210 yards
Kansas	Rushing	Isaiah Marshall	13 carries, 125 yards, 2 TD
Kansas	Receiving	Nik McMillan	6 receptions, 31 yards

=== at West Virginia ===
Kansas Jayhawks (3–6) at West Virginia Mountaineers (5–4) – Game summary

Quarter	1	2	3	4	Total
Jayhawks	0	0	0	0	0
Mountaineers	0	0	0	0	0

at Milan Puskar Stadium • Morgantown, West Virginia

- Date: November 14
- Game time: 4:30 p.m.
- TV: ESPNU

Statistics	KU	WVU
First downs		
Plays–yards		
Rushes–yards		
Passing yards		
Passing: comp–att–int		
Time of possession		

Team	Category	Player	Statistics
Kansas	Passing		
Kansas	Rushing		
Kansas	Receiving		
West Virginia	Passing		
West Virginia	Rushing		
West Virginia	Receiving		

=== vs. No. 10 BYU ===
No. 10 BYU Cougars (8–2) at Kansas Jayhawks (4–6) – Game summary

Quarter	1	2	3	4	Total
No. 10 Cougars	0	0	0	0	0
Jayhawks	0	0	0	0	0

at David Booth Kansas Memorial Stadium • Lawrence, Kansas

- Date: November 21
- Game time: 11:00 a.m.
- TV announcers (ABC): Bob Wischusen, Louis Riddick, and Stormy Buonantony

Statistics	BYU	KU
First downs		
Plays–yards		
Rushes–yards		
Passing yards		
Passing: comp–att–int		
Time of possession		

Team	Category	Player	Statistics
BYU	Passing		
BYU	Rushing		
BYU	Receiving		
Kansas	Passing		
Kansas	Rushing		
Kansas	Receiving		

=== at Oklahoma State ===
Kansas Jayhawks (0–0) at Oklahoma State Cowboys (0–0) – Game summary

Quarter	1	2	3	4	Total
Jayhawks	0	0	0	0	0
Cowboys	0	0	0	0	0

at Boone Pickens Stadium • Stillwater, Oklahoma

- Date: November 28
- Game time: TBD

Statistics	KU	OKST
First downs		
Plays–yards		
Rushes–yards		
Passing yards		
Passing: comp–att–int		
Time of possession		

Team	Category	Player	Statistics
Kansas	Passing		
Kansas	Rushing		
Kansas	Receiving		
Oklahoma State	Passing		
Oklahoma State	Rushing		
Oklahoma State	Receiving		

== Roster ==
2026 Kansas Jayhawks football team roster
Players
Coaches
Offense

Pos.	#	Name	Class
WR	0	Nahzae Cox	Sr
RB	1	Dylan Edwards	Jr
RB	2	Kory Amachree	Fr
WR	3	Keaton Kubecka	Jr
RB	4	Jalen Dupree	So
WR	5	Nik McMillan	Sr
RB	6	Yasin Willis	Sr
WR	7	Cam Pickett	Sr
QB	8	Isaiah Marshall	So
TE	9	Jailen Butler	Sr
QB	10	Chase Jenkins	Jr
WR	11	Tate Nagy	Fr
WR	12	Bryson Hayes	Fr
WR	13	Nate Sims	Fr
TE	14	Mikey Pauley	Sr
QB	15	Cole Ballard	Jr
QB	16	Jaylen Mason	Fr
WR	17	Tyren Parker	Fr
QB	18	Braylen Rooney	Fr
WR	19	Corbin Glasco	Fr
RB	22	Micah Johnson	So
RB	24	John Kelly	Fr
RB	25	Justin Thurman	Fr
TE	35	Jack Utz	Fr
TE	44	Carson Bruhn	So
OL	51	Kasen Carpenter	Jr
OL	52	Nick Morrow	Jr
OL	54	Tavake Tuikolovatu	Jr
OL	55	Trezelle Jenkins	So
OL	56	Amir Herring	Jr
OL	64	Kaden Snyder	Fr
OL	67	Eli Richmond	So
OL	71	James Livingston	Sr
OL	72	DeAndre Harper	So
OL	73	Anderson Kopp	Fr
OL	74	Jack Tanner	So
OL	75	Calvin Clements	Jr
OL	76	Antonio Wilson	Jr
OL	78	Brandon Solis	Jr
OL	79	Connor Stroh	Jr
WR	80	Griffin Baker	Fr
TE	81	Quinton Conley	Sr
WR	82	Israel Moses V	Jr
TE	83	Conlee Hovey	Fr
TE	85	Carter Moses	Sr
WR	86	Donald Collier	So
TE	87	Leyton Cure	Sr
WR	89	Jackson Cook	Fr

Defense

Pos.	#	Name	Class
CB	0	Austin Alexander	So
CB	1	Jalen Todd	Jr
CB	2	Syeed Gibbs	Sr
S	3	Corey Gordon	Sr
LB	4	Trey Lathan	Sr
CB	5	Roman Pearson	Sr
CB	6	Jahlil Hurley	Jr
LB	7	Bam Crouch	Sr
LB	8	Josh Galbreath	Fr
DE	9	Dakyus Brinkley	So
CB	10	Elijah Cannon	So
LB	11	Malachi Curvey	So
S	12	Jaden Harris	Sr
LB	13	Quincy Davis	Jr
LB	14	Jaron Willis	Sr
LB	15	Landyn Watson	Sr
S	16	Brandon Schmelzle	Fr
CB	17	Trey Brown	Fr
LB	18	Joseph Credit	Fr
CB	19	Chris McCorkle	Fr
S	20	Christian Pritchett	Jr
S	22	Khijohnn Cummings-Coleman	So
S	23	Mason Ellis	Sr
S	24	Darrion Jones	Fr
LB	25	Jibreel Al-Amin	Sr
S	27	Taylor Davis	Jr
DE	33	Leroy Harris III	Jr
S	34	Dillon Marshall	So
CB	36	Jameer Moore	So
S	40	Colter McDaniel	So
LB	41	Ezra Vedral	Jr
DE	44	David Santiago	Jr
DE	45	Garrett Martin	Fr
DT	56	Marcus Calvin	Jr
DL	70	Jason Strickland	So
DT	71	Grady Seyfert	Jr
DT	88	Kevin Oatis	Fr
DE	90	Adrian Holley	Fr
DE	91	Alex Bray	Sr
DT	93	Josiah Hammond	Fr
DT	94	Blake Herold	Jr
DT	95	Tre'von McAlpine	Sr
DT	96	Jibriel Conde	Jr
DE	97	Hunter Higgins	Fr
DT	99	Eamon Smalls	Jr

Special teams

Pos.	#	Name	Class
K	29	Martin Connington	So
LS	39	Rino Monteforte	Sr
LS	49	Hollis Moeller	So
PK	98	Dane Efird	Fr
P	99	Matthew Gill	Fr

Head coach

- Lance Leipold

Coordinators/assistant coaches

- Andy Kotelnicki AHC
- Jim Zebrowski PGC/OC
- Matt Lubick Co-OC/TE
- D. K. McDonald DC
- Chris Simpson LB
- Jonathan Wallace RB
- Taiwo Onatolu ST
- Daryl Agpalsa OL
- Joe Dineen DE
- Jim Panagos DT
- Terrence Samuel WR
- Brandon Shelby DB

Legend

- (C) Team captain
- (S) Suspended
- (I) Ineligible
- Injured
- Redshirt

Roster
