= 2026 Arizona State Sun Devils football team =

American college football season

2026 Arizona State Sun Devils football
- Conference: Big 12 Conference
- Record: 6–5 (4–4 Big 12)
- Head coach: Kenny Dillingham (4th season)
- Offensive coordinator: Marcus Arroyo (3rd season)
- Offensive scheme: Pistol
- Defensive coordinator: Brian Ward (4th season)
- Base defense: 4–2–5
- Home stadium: Mountain America Stadium

Uniform
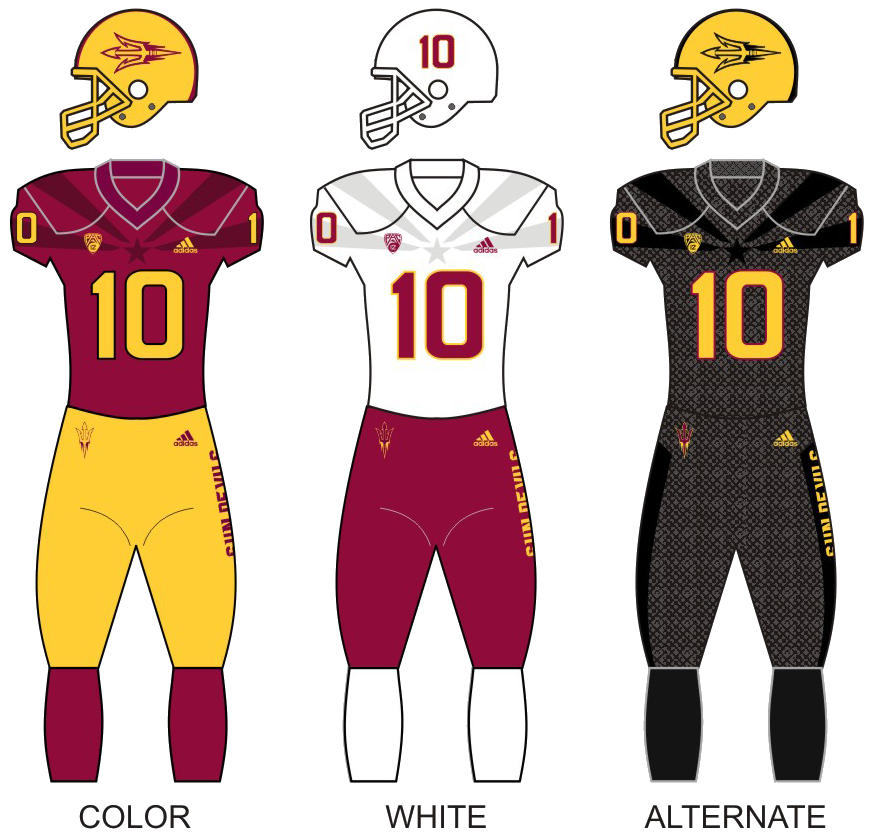

2026 Big 12 Conference football standings
	Conf.			Overall
Team	W		L	W		L
No. 2 Utah y	8	–	0	11	–	0
No. 12 Texas Tech	7	–	1	10	–	1
No. 10 BYU	6	–	2	9	–	2
No. 19 Arizona	5	–	3	8	–	3
No. 20 Houston	5	–	3	8	–	3
Oklahoma State	5	–	3	7	–	4
Baylor	4	–	4	6	–	5
Arizona State	4	–	4	6	–	5
UCF	4	–	4	6	–	5
Iowa State	3	–	5	5	–	6
TCU	3	–	5	5	–	6
Cincinnati	3	–	5	6	–	5
Kansas	2	–	6	4	–	7
West Virginia	2	–	6	5	–	6
Colorado	2	–	6	4	–	7
Kansas State	1	–	7	4	–	7
Championship: TBD vs. Utah
^ – College Football Playoff participant; $ – Conference champion; y – Championship game participant; As of November 22, 2026; Rankings from CFP rankings

The 2026 Arizona State Sun Devils football team represents Arizona State University as a member of the Big 12 Conference during the 2026 NCAA Division I FBS football season. They are led by Kenny Dillingham in his fourth year as their head coach. The Sun Devils play their home games at Mountain America Stadium in Tempe, Arizona.

== Schedule ==
Date	Time	Opponent	Site	TV	Result	Attendance
September 5	7:00 p.m.	Morgan State*	Mountain America Stadium; Tempe, AZ	ESPN+	W 70–7	54,004
September 12	9:00 a.m.	at No. 10 Texas A&M*	Kyle Field; College Station, TX	ABC	L 20–48	107,523
September 19	9:00 a.m.	vs. Kansas	Wembley Stadium; London, England (Union Jack Classic / Big Noon Kickoff)	FS1	W 24–17	46,523
October 3	7:30 p.m.	Baylor	Mountain America Stadium; Tempe, AZ	ESPN	L 19–55	54,063
October 10	7:30 p.m.	Hawaii*	Mountain America Stadium; Tempe, AZ	FS1	W 30–12	47,931
October 17	12:30 p.m.	at No. 10 Texas Tech	Galaxy Stadium; Lubbock, TX	FOX	L 25–53	60,229
October 24	12:45 p.m.	Kansas State	Mountain America Stadium; Tempe, AZ	ESPN2	W 28–17	46,388
October 31	12:30 p.m.	at No. 8 BYU	LaVell Edwards Stadium; Provo, UT	FOX	L 20–27	63,332
November 7	5:30 p.m.	Colorado	Mountain America Stadium; Tempe, AZ	ESPN2	W 20–10	54,166
November 14	3:30 p.m.	at UCF	Acrisure Bounce House; Orlando, FL	ESPNU	W 26–13	44,114
November 21	8:15 p.m.	Oklahoma State^{†}	Mountain America Stadium; Tempe, AZ	ESPN	L 27–30 ^{OT}	51,154
November 28	7:00 p.m.	at Arizona	Casino Del Sol Stadium; Tucson, AZ (The Duel in the Desert)	FOX		
*Non-conference game; ^{†}Homecoming; Rankings from AP Poll (and CFP Rankings, after November 3) – Released prior to game; All times are in Mountain time

== Offseason ==
=== Players drafted into the NFL ===
Round	Pick	NFL team	Player	Position
1	8	New Orleans Saints	Jordyn Tyson	WR
1	21	Pittsburgh Steelers	Max Iheanachor	OT
5	17 (157)	Detroit Lions	Keith Abney II	CB
5	26 (166)	Chicago Bears	Keyshaun Elliott	LB

== Game summaries ==
=== vs. Morgan State (FCS) ===
Morgan State Bears (FCS) (1–0) at Arizona State Sun Devils (0–0) – Game summary

Quarter	1	2	3	4	Total
Bears (FCS)	7	0	0	0	7
Sun Devils	28	21	21	0	70

at Mountain America Stadium • Tempe, Arizona

- Date: September 5
- Game time: 7:00 p.m.
- Game weather: Clear • Temperature: 99 °F (37 °C) • Wind: NW at 10 miles per hour (16 km/h)
- Game attendance: 54,004
- Referee: Kevin Mar
- TV announcers (ESPN+): James Westling and Michael Bumpus

Game information

First quarter

- ASU – Kyson Brown 46-yard run (Carson Smith kick), 13:26. Sun Devils 7–0. Drive: 2 plays, 54 yards, 0:30.
- ASU – Omarion Miller 10-yard pass from Cutter Boley (Carson Smith kick), 12:10. Sun Devils 14–0. Drive: 5 plays, 53 yards, 1:16.
- ASU – Marquis Gillis 25-yard run (Carson Smith kick), 6:15. Sun Devils 21–0. Drive: 5 plays, 50 yards, 1:17.
- MORG – Jordan Barnett 2-yard run (Alex Amaya kick), 4:20. Sun Devils 21–7. Drive: 4 plays, 75 yards, 1:55.
- ASU – Reed Harris 28-yard pass from Cutter Boley (Carson Smith kick), 2:45. Sun Devils 28–7. Drive: 4 plays, 75 yards, 1:34.

Second quarter

- ASU – Grayson Rigdon 54-yard pass from Cutter Boley (Carson Smith kick), 13:28. Sun Devils 35–7. Drive: 3 plays, 72 yards, 1:18.
- ASU – AJ Ia 12-yard pass from Cutter Boley (Carson Smith kick), 9:11. Sun Devils 42–7. Drive: 6 plays, 81 yards, 3:03.
- ASU – Reed Harris 8-yard pass from Cutter Boley (Carson Smith kick), 1:56. Sun Devils 49–7. Drive: 12 plays, 63 yards, 5:41.

Third quarter

- ASU – Grayson Rigdon 56-yard pass from Cutter Boley (Carson Smith kick), 13:14. Sun Devils 56–7. Drive: 4 plays, 63 yards, 1:39.
- ASU – David Avit 1-yard run (Carston Kieffer kick), 7:01. Sun Devils 63–7. Drive: 12 plays, 66 yards, 4:42.
- ASU – Jason Brown Jr. 2-yard run (Carston Kieffer kick), 4:34. Sun Devils 70–7. Drive: 3 plays, 36 yards, 1:19.

Fourth quarter

- No scoring plays.

Statistics	MORG	ASU
First downs	11	32
Plays–yards	49–188	71–681
Rushes–yards	25–102	35–249
Passing yards	86	432
Passing: comp–att–int	11–24–0	26–36–0
Turnovers	0	1
Time of possession	30:12	29:48

Team	Category	Player	Statistics
Morgan State	Passing	Cameron Edge	6/15, 54 yards
Morgan State	Rushing	Marquez Spells	1 carry, 39 yards
Morgan State	Receiving	Justin Perry	3 receptions, 21 yards
Arizona State	Passing	Cutter Boley	21/27, 387 yards, 6 TD
Arizona State	Rushing	Kyson Brown	6 carries, 80 yards, TD
Arizona State	Receiving	Reed Harris	6 receptions, 137 yards, 2 TD

=== at No. 10 Texas A&M ===
Arizona State Sun Devils (1–0) at No. 10 Texas A&M Aggies (1–0) – Game summary

Quarter	1	2	3	4	Total
Sun Devils	7	3	10	0	20
No. 10 Aggies	7	10	7	24	48

at Kyle Field • College Station, Texas

- Date: September 12
- Game time: 9:00 a.m. MST
- Game weather: Sunny • Temperature: 87 °F (31 °C) • Wind: S at 13 miles per hour (21 km/h)
- Game attendance: 107,523
- Referee: Stephen Baron
- TV announcers (ABC): Tom Hart, Jesse Palmer and Kris Budden

Game information

First quarter

- TA&M – Rueben Owens II 2-yard run (David Olano kick), 4:55. Aggies 7–0. Drive: 2 plays, 8 yards, 0:58.
- ASU – Reed Harris 21-yard pass from Cutter Boley (Carson Smith kick), 0:21. Tied 7–7. Drive: 11 plays, 75 yards, 4:34.

Second quarter

- TA&M – Isaiah Horton 4-yard pass from Marcel Reed (David Olano kick), 9:15. Aggies 14–7. Drive: 13 plays, 75 yards, 6:06.
- ASU – Carson Smith 30-yard field goal, 6:15. Aggies 14–10. Drive: 8 plays, 62 yards, 3:00.
- TA&M – David Olano 22-yard field goal, 0:03. Aggies 17–10. Drive: 8 plays, 38 yards, 2:20.

Third quarter

- ASU – Carson Smith 35-yard field goal, 10:19. Aggies 17–13. Drive: 9 plays, 38 yards, 4:33.
- TA&M – Isaiah Horton 13-yard pass from Marcel Reed (David Olano kick), 5:53. Aggies 24–13. Drive: 8 plays, 75 yards, 4:26.
- ASU – Reed Harris 58-yard pass from Cutter Boley (Carson Smith kick), 3:39. Aggies 24–20. Drive: 5 plays, 75 yards, 2:14.

Fourth quarter

- TA&M – Mario Craver 33-yard pass from Marcel Reed (David Olano kick), 14:20. Aggies 31–20. Drive: 3 plays, 44 yards, 0:59.
- TA&M – Marco Jones 55-yard interception return (David Olano kick), 8:38. Aggies 38–20.
- TA&M – David Olano 39-yard field goal, 5:58. Aggies 41–20. Drive: 4 plays, 4 yards, 2:25.
- TA&M – Julio Humphrey 45-yard interception return (David Olano kick), 4:25. Aggies 48–20.

Statistics	ASU	TAMU
First downs	16	14
Plays–yards	63–369	60–255
Rushes–yards	29–115	35–92
Passing yards	254	163
Passing: comp–att–int	21–34–2	15–25–1
Turnovers	4	1
Time of possession	30:04	29:56

Team	Category	Player	Statistics
Arizona State	Passing	Cutter Boley	21/34, 254 yards, 2 TD, 2 INT
Arizona State	Rushing	Kyson Brown	13 carries, 66 yards
Arizona State	Receiving	Reed Harris	9 receptions, 189 yards, 2 TD
Texas A&M	Passing	Marcel Reed	15/25, 163 yards, 3 TD, INT
Texas A&M	Rushing	Rueben Owens II	10 carries, 35 yards, TD
Texas A&M	Receiving	Terry Bussey	4 receptions, 58 yards

=== vs. Kansas ===
This was the first-ever game in the Union Jack Classic, broadcast on Big Noon Kickoff.

Arizona State Sun Devils (1–1) vs. Kansas Jayhawks (1–1) – Game summary
Union Jack Classic

Quarter	1	2	3	4	Total
Sun Devils	3	7	7	7	24
Jayhawks	0	7	0	10	17

at Wembley Stadium • London, England

- Date: September 19
- Game time: 5:10 p.m. BST
- Game weather: Rain • Temperature: 66 °F (19 °C) • Wind: SW at 10 miles per hour (16 km/h)
- Game attendance: 46,523
- Referee: Kevin Boitman
- TV announcers (FS1): Connor Onion, Robert Griffin III and Alexa Landestoy
- Report: Official report

Game information

First quarter

- ASU – Carson Smith 39-yard field goal, 9:22. Arizona State 3–0. Drive: 10 plays, 44 yards, 3:50.

Second quarter

- KAN – Tate Nagy 72-yard punt return (Martin Connington kick), 10:27. Kansas 7–3. Drive: 3 plays, -1 yard, 1:54.
- ASU – Reed Harris 25-yard pass from Cutter Boley (Carson Smith kick), 0:20. Arizona State 10–7. Drive: 1 play, 25 yards, 0:05.

Third quarter

- ASU – Jaren Hamilton 100-yard kick return (Carson Smith kick), 14:46. Arizona State 17–7. Drive: 0 plays, 0 yards, 0:00.

Fourth quarter

- ASU – Cutter Boley 1-yard run (Carson Smith kick), 12:30. Arizona State 24–7. Drive: 2 plays, 2 yards, 1:04.
- KAN – Tate Nagy 38-yard pass from Isaiah Marshall (Martin Connington kick), 6:52. Arizona State 24–14. Drive: 5 plays, 67 yard, 1:15.
- KAN – Martin Connington 46-yard field goal, 3:51. Arizona State 24–17. Drive: 8 plays, 52 yards, 1:23.

Statistics	ASU	KU
First downs	13	22
Plays–yards	66–228	74–414
Rushes–yards	43–133	41–179
Passing yards	95	235
Passing: comp–att–int	11–23–0	17–33–1
Time of possession	30:42	29:18

Team	Category	Player	Statistics
Arizona State	Passing	Cutter Boley	11/23, 95 yards, TD
Arizona State	Rushing	Kyson Brown	24 carries, 81 yards
Arizona State	Receiving	Reed Harris	4 receptions, 48 yards, TD
Kansas	Passing	Isaiah Marshall	17/33, 235 yards, TD, INT
Kansas	Rushing	Dylan Edwards	18 carries, 89 yards
Kansas	Receiving	Nik McMillan	4 receptions, 44 yards

=== vs. Baylor ===
Baylor Bears (3–1) at Arizona State Sun Devils (2–1) – Game summary

Quarter	1	2	3	4	Total
Bears	14	10	21	10	55
Sun Devils	3	10	3	3	19

at Mountain America Stadium • Tempe, Arizona

- Date: October 3
- Game time: 9:30 p.m
- Game weather: Clear • Temperature: 90 °F (32 °C) • Wind: E at 10 miles per hour (16 km/h)
- Game attendance: 54,063
- Referee: Luke Richmond
- TV announcers (ESPN): Roy Philpott (play-by-play), Brock Osweiler (analyst) and Sherree Burruss (sideline)

Game information

First quarter

- ASU – Carson Smith 46-yard field goal, 9:47. Arizona State 3–0. Drive: 9 plays, 51 yards, 3:02.
- BAY – Ryelan Morris 63-yard run (Rhett Armstrong kick), 9:13. Baylor 7–3. Drive: 2 plays, 75 yards, 0:35.
- BAY – Tony Livingston 3-yard pass from DJ Lagway (Rhett Armstrong kick), 3:01. Baylor 14–3. Drive: 9 plays, 72 yards, 3:10.

Second quarter

- BAY – Louis Brown IV 10-yard pass from DJ Lagway (Rhett Armstrong kick), 14:10. Baylor 21–3. Drive: 7 plays, 64 yards, 1:39.
- ASU – Carson Smith 32-yard field goal, 9:59. Baylor 21–6. Drive: 11 plays, 61 yards, 4:11.
- ASU – Omarion Miller 30-yard pass (Carson Smith kick), 1:51. Baylor 21–13. Drive: 5 plays, 80 yards, 0:58.
- BAY – Rhett Armstrong 36-yard field goal, 0:00. Baylor 24–13. Drive: 10 plays, 57 yards, 1:51.

Third quarter

- BAY – Hawkins Polley 3-yard pass from DJ Lagway (Rhett Armstrong kick), 11:38. Baylor 31–13. Drive: 9 plays, 77 yards, 3:16.
- BAY – Jadon Porter 8-yard pass from DJ Lagway (Rhett Armstrong kick), 9:29. Baylor 38–13. Drive: 5 plays, 40 yards, 0:59.
- ASU – Carson Smith 36-yard field goal, 4:54. Baylor 38–16. Drive: 13 plays, 64 yards, 4:40.
- BAY – Caden Knighten 75-yard run (Rhett Armstrong kick), 4:31. Baylor 45–16. Drive: 1 plays, 75 yards, 0:13.

Fourth quarter

- ASU – Carson Smith 40-yard field goal, 11:36. Baylor 45–19. Drive: 8 plays, 44 yards, 3:05.
- BAY – DJ Lagway 11-yard run (Rhett Armstrong kick), 5:58. Baylor 52–16. Drive: 10 plays, 49 yards, 5:36.
- BAY – Rhett Armstrong 23-yard field goal, 3:50. Baylor 55–19. Drive: 4 plays, 5 yards, 2:04.

Statistics	BAY	ASU
First downs	26	23
Plays–yards	79–564	74–409
Rushes–yards	36–244	30–99
Passing yards	320	310
Passing: comp–att–int	27–43–0	26–44–1
Time of possession	31:05	28:55

Team	Category	Player	Statistics
Baylor	Passing	DJ Lagway	25/40, 306 yards, 4 TD
Baylor	Rushing	Caden Knighten	6 carries, 84 yards, TD
Baylor	Receiving	Gavin Freeman	7 receptions, 115 yards
Arizona State	Passing	Cutter Boley	25/43, 304 yards, TD, INT
Arizona State	Rushing	Cardae Mack	5 carries, 34 yards
Arizona State	Receiving	Reed Harris	7 receptions, 125 yards

=== vs. Hawaii ===
Hawaii Rainbow Warriors (1–4) at Arizona State Sun Devils (2–2) – Game summary

Quarter	1	2	3	4	Total
Rainbow Warriors	3	3	0	6	12
Sun Devils	7	10	7	6	30

at Mountain America Stadium • Tempe, Arizona

- Date: October 10
- Game time: 7:30 p.m.
- Game weather: Cloudy • Temperature: 76 °F (24 °C) • Wind: NE at 5 miles per hour (8.0 km/h)
- Game attendance: 47,931
- Referee: Cravonne Barrett
- TV announcers (FS1): Dan Hellie (play-by-play) and Robert Smith (analyst)

Game information

First quarter

- HAW – Sean Olvera-Harle 44-yard field goal, 13:41. Hawaii 3–0. Drive: 5 plays, 49 yards, 1:19.
- ASU – Reed Harris 18-yard pass from Cutter Boley (Carson Smith kick), 8:13. Arizona State 7–3. Drive: 10 plays, 79 yards, 5:17.

Second quarter

- ASU – Cardae Mack 1-yard run (Carson Smith kick), 9:46. Arizona State 14–3. Drive: 6 plays, 67 yards, 1:36.
- HAW – Sean Olvera-Harle 30-yard field goal, 1:22. Arizona State 14–6. Drive: 11 plays, 80 yards, 4:40.
- ASU – Carson Smith 47-yard field goal, 0:15. Arizona State 17–6. Drive: 8 plays, 37 yards, 1:00.

Third quarter

- ASU – Cardae Mack 67-yard run (Carson Smith kick), 0:51. Arizona State 24–3. Drive: 5 plays, 96 yards, 1:57.

Fourth quarter

- HAW – Audric Harris 32-yard pass from Micah Alejado (two-point conversion failed), 12:35. Arizona State 24–12. Drive: 9 plays, 75 yards, 3:16.
- ASU – Reed Harris 9-yard pass from Cutter Boley (two-point conversion failed), 1:55. Arizona State 30–12. Drive: 9 plays, 79 yards, 5:58.

Statistics	HAW	ASU
First downs	21	21
Plays–yards	73–316	61–420
Rushes–yards	22–64	30–231
Passing yards	252	189
Passing: comp–att–int	26–51–1	21–31–0
Time of possession	31:17	28:43

Team	Category	Player	Statistics
Hawaii	Passing	Micah Alejado	25/49, 252 yards, TD, INT
Hawaii	Rushing	DeVon Rice	6 carries, 28 yards
Hawaii	Receiving	Kainoa Carvalho	7 receptions, 86 yards
Arizona State	Passing	Cutter Boley	21/31, 189 yards, 2 TD
Arizona State	Rushing	Cardae Mack	13 carries, 154 yards
Arizona State	Receiving	Reed Harris	8 receptions, 91 yards, 2 TD

=== at No. 10 Texas Tech ===
Arizona State Sun Devils (3–2) at No. 10 Texas Tech Red Raiders (5–0) – Game summary

Quarter	1	2	3	4	Total
Sun Devils	7	3	7	8	25
No. 10 Red Raiders	21	22	0	10	53

at Galaxy Stadium, Lubbock, Texas

- Date: October 17
- Game time: 12:30 p.m.
- Game weather: Sunny • Temperature: 58 °F (14 °C) • Wind: NW 5 mph
- Game attendance: 60,229
- Referee: Kevin Mar
- TV announcers (Fox): Connor Onion, Robert Griffin III, and Alexa Landestoy
- Box score, Recap

Game information
First quarter
- TTU – Ben Roberts 24-yard interception return (Stone Harrington kick), 7:48. Red Raiders 7–0.
- TTU – Will Hammond 9-yard run (Stone Harrington kick), 5:12. Red Raiders 14–0. Drive: 2 plays, 33 yards, 0:26.
- TTU – J'Koby Williams 62-yard run (Stone Harrington kick), 3:17. Red Raiders 21–0. Drive: 1 play, 62 yards, 0:10.
- ASU – Raiden Vines-Bright 74-yard pass from Cutter Boley (Carson Smith kick), 2:27. Red Raiders 21–7. Drive: 2 plays, 75 yards, 0:50.

Second quarter

- TTU – Stone Harrington 31-yard field goal, 12:43. Red Raiders 24–7. Drive: 12 plays, 60 yards, 4:39.
- ASU – Carson Smith 30-yard field goal, 8:24. Red Raiders 24–10. Drive: 9 plays, 62 yards, 4:19.
- TTU – Stone Harrington 42-yard field goal, 6:25. Red Raiders 27–10. Drive: 5 plays, 51 yards, 1:59.
- TTU – J'Koby Williams 38-yard run (kick blocked), 4:08. Red Raiders 33–10. Drive: 3 plays, 67 yards, 0:56.
- TTU – Coy Eakin 11-yard pass from Will Hammond (Stone Harrington kick), 0:31. Red Raiders 40–10. Drive: 6 plays, 39 yards, 1:26.
- TTU – Stone Harrington 37-yard field goal, 0:00. Red Raiders 43–10. Drive: 3 plays, 9 yards, 0:16.

Third quarter

- ASU – Reed Harris 2-yard pass from Mikey Keene (Carson Smith kick), 9:34. Red Raiders 43–17. Drive: 11 plays, 75 yards, 5:26.

Fourth quarter

- TTU – Stone Harrington 34-yard field goal, 14:57. Red Raiders 46–17. Drive: 8 plays, 38 yards, 3:20.
- TTU – Terrance Carter Jr. 1-yard run (Stone Harrington kick), 9:28. Red Raiders 53–17. Drive: 4 plays, 25 yards, 1:59.
- ASU – Cardae Mack 12-yard pass from Mikey Keene (Mikey Keene pass to Kyson Brown), 6:32. Red Raiders 53–25. Drive: 11 plays, 75 yards, 2:56.

Statistics	ASU	TTU
First downs	21	21
Total yards	415	502
Rushing yards	35	260
Passing yards	380	242
Turnovers	2	1
Time of possession	32:33	27:27

Team	Category	Player	Statistics
Arizona State	Passing	Mikey Keene	25/34, 256 yards, 2 TD
Arizona State	Rushing	Kyson Brown	5 rushes, 39 yards
Arizona State	Receiving	Derek Eusebio	7 receptions, 89 yards
Texas Tech	Passing	Will Hammond	18/26, 232 yards, TD
Texas Tech	Rushing	J'Koby Williams	11 rushes, 165 yards, 2 TD
Texas Tech	Receiving	Kenny Johnson	7 receptions, 120 yards

=== vs. Kansas State ===
Kansas State Wildcats (4–2) at Arizona State Sun Devils (3–3) – Game summary

Quarter	1	2	3	4	Total
Wildcats	7	3	7	0	17
Sun Devils	7	7	0	14	28

at Mountain America Stadium • Tempe, Arizona

- Date: October 24
- Game time: 12:45 p.m.
- Game weather: Sunny • Temperature: 75 °F (24 °C) • Wind: W at 4 miles per hour (6.4 km/h)
- Game attendance: 46,388
- Referee: Tutashinda Salaam
- TV announcers (ESPN2): Jay Alter (play-by-play), Tom Luginbill (analyst), and Lauren Sisler (sideline)
- Box Score

Game information

First quarter

- KSU – Jaron Tibbs 7-yard pass from Jacob Knuth (Luis Rodriguez Kick), 10:38. Kansas State 7–0. Drive: 9 plays, 65 yards, 4:22.
- ASU – Cardae Mack 9-yard run (Carson Smith Kick), 9:48. Tied 7–7. Drive: 4 plays, 77 yards, 0:50.

Second quarter

- ASU – Cardae Mack 1-yard run (Carson Smith Kick), 14:16. Arizona State 14–7. Drive: 9 plays, 55 yards, 3:10.
- KSU – Luis Rodriguez 22-yard field goal, 5:47. Arizona State 14–10. Drive: 7 plays, 47 yards, 3:25.

Third quarter

- KSU – Jacob Knuth 20-yard run (Luis Rodriguez Kick), 7:59. Kansas State 17–14. Drive: 4 plays, 21 yards, 3:02.

Fourth quarter

- ASU – Cardae Mack 12-yard run (Carson Smith Kick), 14:55. Arizona State 21–17. Drive: 7 plays, 71 yards, 3:02.
- ASU – Cardae Mack 11-yard run (Carson Smith Kick), 6:23. Arizona State 28–17. Drive: 7 plays, 65 yards, 2:30.

Statistics	KSU	ASU
First downs	18	19
Plays–yards	73–278	71–359
Rushes–yards	32–84	40–147
Passing yards	194	212
Passing: comp–att–int	26–41–0	14–31–0
Time of possession	33:10	29:06

Team	Category	Player	Statistics
Kansas State	Passing	Jacob Knuth	26/41, 194 yards, TD
Kansas State	Rushing	Rodney Fields Jr.	10 carries, 46 yards
Kansas State	Receiving	Derrick Salley Jr.	6 receptions, 63 yards
Arizona State	Passing	Mikey Keene	10/20, 160 yards
Arizona State	Rushing	Cardae Mack	26 carries, 161 yards, 4 TD
Arizona State	Receiving	Reed Harris	6 receptions, 147

=== at No. 8 BYU ===
Arizona State Sun Devils (4–3) at No. 8 BYU Cougars (6–1) – Game summary

Quarter	1	2	3	4	Total
Sun Devils	0	3	14	3	20
No. 8 Cougars	7	10	0	10	27

at LaVell Edwards Stadium • Provo, Utah

- Date: October 31
- Game time: 12:30 p.m.
- Game weather: Cloudy • Temperature: 55 °F (13 °C) • Wind: SW 4 mph (6.4 km/h)
- Game attendance: 63,332
- Referee: Stephen Baron
- TV announcers (FOX): Connor Onion, Robert Griffin III, and Alexa Landestoy

Game information

First quarter

- BYU – 10:47 Sione Moa 1-yard fumble recovery in the endzone (Matthias Dunn kick). BYU 7–0. Drive: 6 plays, 29 yards, 3:09.

Second quarter

- ASU – 14:06 Carson Smith 24-yard Field Goal. BYU 7–3. Drive: 13 plays, 53 yards, 5:16.
- BYU – 6:22 Matthias Dunn 28-yard Field Goal. BYU 10–3. Drive: 9 plays, 60 yards, 4:31.
- BYU – 1:55 Kyler Kasper 13-yard pass from Bear Bachmeier (Matthias Dunn kick). BYU 17–3. Drive: 7 plays, 48 yards, 3:08.

Third quarter

- ASU – 6:30 Omarion Miller 20-yard pass from Jake Fette (Carson Smith kick). BYU 17–10. Drive: 13 plays, 81 yards, 6:16.
- ASU – 1:15 Anthony Miller Jr. 1-yard pass from Jake Fette (Carson Smith kick). TIED 17–17. Drive: 12 plays, 39 yards, 4:55.

Fourth quarter

- BYU – 12:08 Matthias Dunn 45-yard Field Goal. BYU 20–17. Drive: 9 plays, 39 yards, 4:02.
- BYU – 2:09 Sione Moa 1-yard run (Matthias Dunn kick). BYU 27–17. Drive: 11 plays, 95 yards, 6:00.
- ASU – 0:57 Carson Smith 44-yard Field Goal. BYU 27–20. Drive: 7 plays, 49 yards, 1:00.

Statistics	ASU	BYU
First downs	20	18
Plays–yards	76–279	60–283
Rushes–yards	34–113	30–47
Passing yards	166	236
Passing: comp–att–int	22–42–0	19–30–1
Time of possession	31:25	28:35

Team	Category	Player	Statistics
Arizona State	Passing	Jake Fette	22/42, 166 yards, 2 TD
Arizona State	Rushing	Cardae Mack	23 carries, 123 yards
Arizona State	Receiving	Derek Eusebio	7 receptions, 48 yards
BYU	Passing	Bear Bachmeier	19/30, 236 yards, TD, INT
BYU	Rushing	Sione Moa	8 carries, 20 yards, 2 TD
BYU	Receiving	Legend Glasker	4 receptions, 87 yards

=== vs. Colorado ===
Colorado Buffaloes (3–5) at Arizona State Sun Devils (4–4) – Game summary

Quarter	1	2	3	4	Total
Buffaloes	0	0	3	7	10
Sun Devils	3	14	0	3	20

at Mountain America Stadium • Tempe, Arizona

- Date: November 7
- Game time: 5:30 p.m.
- Game weather: Sunny • Temperature: 81 °F (27 °C) • Wind: E 6 mph
- Game attendance: 54,166
- Referee: Henry Johns
- TV announcers (ESPN2): Chuckie Kempf (play-by-play), Dustin Fox (analyst) and Lauren Sisler (sideline)

Game information

First quarter

- (6:31) ASU – Carson Smith 31-yard field goal (Drive: 13 plays, 61 yards, 6:36; Arizona State 3–0)

Second quarter

- (11:12) ASU – Jake Fette 1-yard pass from Cardae Mack, Carson Smith kick (Drive: 10 plays, 66 yards, 4:35; Arizona State 10–0)
- (2:54) ASU – Reed Harris 34-yard pass from Jake Fette, Carson Smith kick (Drive: 5 plays, 42 yards, 2:35; Arizona State 17–0)

Third quarter

- (0:00) COLO – Elliot Arnold 39-yard field goal (Drive: 15 plays, 61 yards, 6:29; Arizona State 17–3)

Fourth quarter

- (12:09) ASU – Carson Smith 21-yard field goal (Drive: 7 plays, 71 yards, 2:51; Arizona State 20–3)
- (8:14) COLO – Joseph Williams 7-yard pass from Isaac Wilson, Daniel Gerlach kick (Drive: 10 plays, 75 yards, 3:55; Arizona State 20–10)

Statistics	COLO	ASU
First downs	17	15
Plays–yards	65–312	64–304
Rushes–yards	34–64	42–108
Passing yards	248	196
Passing: comp–att–int	20–31–1	15–22–0
Time of possession	26:54	33:06

Team	Category	Player	Statistics
Colorado	Passing	Isaac Wilson	20/31, 248 yards, TD, INT
Colorado	Rushing	Richard Young	15 carries, 47 yards
Colorado	Receiving	Joseph Williams	7 receptions, 121 yards, TD
Arizona State	Passing	Jake Fette	13/19, 187 yards, TD
Arizona State	Rushing	Cardae Mack	24 carries, 80 yards
Arizona State	Receiving	Reed Harris	4 receptions, 103 yards, TD

=== at UCF ===
Arizona State Sun Devils (5–4) at UCF Knights (5–4) – Game summary

Quarter	1	2	3	4	Total
Sun Devils	0	16	0	10	26
Knights	0	7	0	6	13

at Acrisure Bounce House • Orlando, Florida

- Date: November 14
- Game time: 1:30 p.m. (postponed to 3:35 p.m. due to ground stop)
- Game weather: Cloudy • Temperature: 60 °F (16 °C) • Wind: S at 11 mph
- Game attendance: 44,114
- Referee: Cravonne Barrett
- TV announcers (ESPNU): Chuckie Kempf (play-by-play) and Dustin Fox (analyst)

Game information

First quarter

- No scoring plays

Second quarter

- ASU – Marquis Gillis 1-yard run (Carson Smith Kick), 14:55, Sun Devils 7–0. Drive: 10 plays, 74 yards, 5:38.
- ASU – Carson Smith 51-yard field goal, 4:18, Sun Devils 10–0. Drive: 12 plays, 47 yards, 5:22.
- UCF – Landen Chambers 2-yard run (Will Stone kick), 1:53, Sun Devils 10–7. Drive: 6 plays, 67 yards, 2:19.
- ASU – Carson Smith 41-yard field goal, 0:43, Sun Devils 13–7. Drive: 7 plays, 52 yards, 1:10.
- ASU – Carson Smith 28-yard field goal, 0:16, Sun Devils 16–7. Drive: 4 plays, 9 yards, 0:20.

Third quarter

- No scoring plays

Fourth quarter

- ASU – Cardae Mack 8-yard run (Carson Smith Kick), 13:39, Sun Devils 23–7. Drive: 14 plays, 81 yards, 7:16.
- ASU – Carson Smith 37-yard field goal, 6:02, Sun Devils 26–7. Drive: 8 plays, 36 yards, 5:09.
- UCF – Tyren Hornes 40-yard pass from Alonza Barnett III (Pass failed), 2:12, Sun Devils 26–13. Drive: 3 plays, 57 yards, 0:34.

Statistics	ASU	UCF
First downs	23	15
Plays–yards	79–389	54–311
Rushes–yards	42–165	23–54
Passing yards	224	257
Passing: comp–att–int	22–37–0	21–31–0
Time of possession	37:45	22:15

Team	Category	Player	Statistics
Arizona State	Passing	Jake Fette	21/36, 196 yards
Arizona State	Rushing	Cardae Mack	25 carries, 111 yards, TD
Arizona State	Receiving	Reed Harris	7 receptions, 80 yards
UCF	Passing	Alonza Barnett III	21/30, 257 yards, TD
UCF	Rushing	Landen Chambers	7 carries, 54 yards, TD
UCF	Receiving	Josh Derry	7 receptions, 137 yards

=== vs. Oklahoma State ===
Oklahoma State Cowboys (6–4) at Arizona State Sun Devils (6–4) – Game summary

Quarter	1	2	Total
Cowboys			0
Sun Devils			0

at Mountain America Stadium • Tempe, Arizona

- Date: November 21
- Game time: 8:15 p.m.
- TV announcers (ESPN): Roy Philpott, Brock Osweiler, and Sherree Burress

Statistics	OKST	ASU
First downs		
Plays–yards		
Rushes–yards		
Passing yards		
Passing: comp–att–int		
Time of possession		

Team	Category	Player	Statistics
Oklahoma State	Passing		
Oklahoma State	Rushing		
Oklahoma State	Receiving		
Arizona State	Passing		
Arizona State	Rushing		
Arizona State	Receiving		

=== at Arizona ===
Arizona State Sun Devils (0–0) at Arizona Wildcats (0–0) – Game summary

Quarter	1	2	Total
Sun Devils			0
Wildcats			0

at Casino Del Sol Stadium • Tucson, Arizona

- Date: November 28
- Game time: 7:00 p.m.
- TV: FOX

Statistics	ASU	ARIZ
First downs		
Plays–yards		
Rushes–yards		
Passing yards		
Passing: comp–att–int		
Time of possession		

Team	Category	Player	Statistics
Arizona State	Passing		
Arizona State	Rushing		
Arizona State	Receiving		
Arizona	Passing		
Arizona	Rushing		
Arizona	Receiving		
