= 2026 Hawaii Rainbow Warriors football team =

American college football season

2026 Hawaii Rainbow Warriors football
- Conference: Mountain West Conference
- Record: 3–8 (2–6 MW)
- Head coach: Timmy Chang (5th season)
- Offensive coordinator: Anthony Arceneaux (2nd season)
- Offensive scheme: Run and shoot
- Defensive coordinator: Dennis Thurman (3rd season)
- Base defense: 4–2–5
- Captains: Micah Alejado; Cam Barfield; Jamih Otis; Elijah Palmer
- Home stadium: Clarence T. C. Ching Athletics Complex

2026 Mountain West Conference football standings
	Conf.			Overall
Team	W		L	W		L
New Mexico	6	–	1	9	–	2
North Dakota State	6	–	2	9	–	2
Wyoming	6	–	2	7	–	4
Air Force	5	–	2	9	–	2
UNLV	5	–	2	7	–	4
Nevada	4	–	3	5	–	6
San Jose State	3	–	5	5	–	7
Hawaii	2	–	6	3	–	8
UTEP	0	–	7	1	–	10
Northern Illinois	0	–	7	0	–	11
Championship: December 4, 2026
As of November 22, 2026; Rankings from CFP rankings

The 2026 Hawaii Rainbow Warriors football team represents the University of Hawaiʻi at Mānoa (Hawaiʻi or UH) in the Mountain West Conference (MW) during the 2026 NCAA Division I FBS football season. The Rainbow Warriors are led by Timmy Chang in his fifth year as the program's head coach. The Rainbow Warriors play home games at the Clarence T. C. Ching Athletics Complex, located in the Honolulu neighborhood of Mānoa.

== Schedule ==
Date	Time	Opponent	Site	TV	Result	Attendance
August 29	1:00 p.m.	at Stanford*	Stanford Stadium; Stanford, CA	ACCN	L 27–37	23,222
September 5	4:00 p.m.	UNLV	Clarence T. C. Ching Athletics Complex; Honolulu, HI	The CW	L 6–21	15,014
September 12	6:00 p.m.	New Mexico State*	Clarence T. C. Ching Athletics Complex; Honolulu, HI	KFVE/MW+	W 29–19	12,905
September 26	9:00 a.m.	at Wyoming	War Memorial Stadium; Laramie, WY (rivalry)	The CW	L 10–27	20,999
October 3	6:00 p.m.	San Jose State	Clarence T. C. Ching Athletics Complex; Honolulu, HI (Dick Tomey Legacy Game)	KFVE/MW+	L 16–20	13,366
October 10	4:30 p.m.	at Arizona State*	Mountain America Stadium; Tempe, AZ	FS1	L 12–30	47,931
October 17	4:30 p.m.	New Mexico^{†}	Clarence T. C. Ching Athletics Complex; Honolulu, HI	FS1	L 10–21	12,941
October 24	9:30 a.m.	at Northern Illinois	Huskie Stadium; DeKalb, IL	KFVE (Note: Simulcast in Hawaii.)/MW+	W 56–21	7,650
November 7	4:30 p.m.	at UTEP	Sun Bowl Stadium; El Paso, TX	FS1	W 17–14	8,581
November 14	6:00 p.m.	North Dakota State	Clarence T. C. Ching Athletics Complex; Honolulu, HI	The CW	L 13–21	15,014
November 21	4:30 p.m.	at Nevada	Mackay Stadium; Reno, NV	FS1	L 8–16	14,951
November 28	6:00 p.m.	Sacramento State*	Clarence T. C. Ching Athletics Complex; Honolulu, HI	KFVE/MW+		
*Non-conference game; ^{†}Homecoming; All times are in Hawaii time

== Offseason ==
=== Transfers ===
==== Outgoing ====
Player	Position	Destination
Dermaricus Davis	QB	Cal Poly
Billy Gowers	P	Indiana
Brandon White	WR	Kansas State
Jackson Harris	WR	LSU
Luke Weaver	QB	San Jose State
Joey Farthing	WR	Unknown
Deliyon Freeman	CB	Northern Arizona
Semaj James	S	Unknown
Tim Malo	S	Southern Utah

==== Incoming ====
Player	Position	Previous school
Carson Brown	WR	Iowa State
DeVon Rice	RB	Kansas State
Ozzy Pollard	DL	Marian
Jeremiah Hughes	CB	Michigan State
Tre' Griffiths	WR	Oklahoma State
Lipe Moala	IOL	Oregon
Spencer Elliott	EDGE	Portland State
Denaris DeRosa Jr.	IOL	San Jose State
Khalil Walker	IOL	South Florida
Kodi DeCambra	S	UNLV
Bjorn Jurgensen	QB	Virginia
Devin Alves	WR	Virginia Tech
Caleb Brown	CB	Virginia Tech
Jaylon Edmond	CB	Wake Forest
Audric Harris	WR	Washington
Joenel Figueroa	S	West Georgia
Geoffrey Speight	DL	West Georgia
Adam Tomczyk	EDGE	West Virginia

== Roster ==
2026 Hawaii Rainbow Warriors football team roster
Players
Coaches
Offense

Pos.	#	Name	Class
RB	0	Cam Barfield (C)	Sr
RB	1	DeVon Rice	So
WR	2	Audric Harris	Jr
WR	3	Carson Brown	Sr
WR	4	Jarvis Heimuli	So
WR	5	Pofele Ashlock (injured)	Sr
WR	6	Kainoa Carvalho	Fr
WR	7	Tre' Griffiths	Sr
WR	8	Tama Uiliata	So
TE	9	Devin Tauaefa	Sr
QB	10	Bjorn Jurgensen	Fr
WR	11	Devin Alves	Sr
QB	12	Micah Alejado (C)	So
WR	13	Koa Eldredge	Sr
QB	14	Isaac Jaramilla-Phe	Sr
QB	16	Hazyn Botelho	Fr
WR	17	Nick Delgaddio	Jr
WR	18	Blaze Kamoku	Sr
WR	19	Diezel Kamoku	So
WR	22	Titan Lacaden	Fr
RB	26	Sitani Mikaele	So
RB	28	TJ Foʻilefutu	Fr
RB	30	James Steffany-Flame	Fr
RB	31	Noah Bartley	Sr
TE	45	Micah Kaonohi-Kaihenui	Sr
TE	46	Matthew Bailiff	Jr
OL	50	Tuʻi Muti	So
OL	51	Eric McFall	So
OL	52	Dean Briski	Sr
OL	53	Kawika Hallums	Fr
OL	54	Jordan Kernaghan	Fr
OL	55	Jay Tauala-Harris	So
OL	56	Boogie Henderson	So
OL	57	Ethan Spencer	Sr
OL	58	Denaris DeRosa Jr.	Sr
OL	60	Ezekiel Salanoa	Fr
OL	62	Lautaimi Manuma	So
OL	65	Vake Hehea	Jr
OL	66	Cooper Troy	Fr
OL	72	Josh Tavui	Fr
OL	73	Lipe Moala	Jr
OL	74	Vainuupo Fanuaea	Fr
OL	75	Khalil Walker	Jr
OL	77	Uluaki Taukiuvea	Fr
OL	79	Judah Kaio	Sr
WR	80	Robert Haynes IV (injured)	Fr
TE	81	Frank Abreu	Fr
WR	83	Josiah Fetui	So
WR	84	Dillon Booth
TE	85	Oakie Salaveʻa	Sr
WR	86	Brandon Gaea	Fr
TE	87	Andrew Price	Fr
TE	88	Anthony Hickman (injured)	So

Defense

Pos.	#	Name	Class
CB	0	Jeremiah Hughes	Jr
S	2	Kona Moore	Sr
S	3	Joenel Figueroa (injured)	Sr
NB	4	Elijah Palmer (C)	Sr
CB	5	Jaylon Edmond	So
CB	6	Zion Allen	Sr
LB	7	Julian Smith	Jr
LB	8	Matteus Ioane	So
DL	9	Adam Tomczyk	Sr
DL	10	Kaeo Akana	Sr
LB	11	Jamih Otis (C)	Sr
LB	12	Wynden Hoʻohuli	Sr
CB	13	Elijah Gipson	Sr
S	14	Riis Weber	Sr
LB	17	Ben Hudson	Sr
LB	18	Zaden Mariteragi	Fr
DB	19	Kela Moore	So
DL	20	Noah Wily	So
NB	21	Makana Meyer	Jr
DB	22	Ezekiel Rodrigues	So
DB	23	Kydel Stone	Fr
DB	24	Kodi DeCambra	Jr
S	25	Matagi Thompson	Sr
DL	26	Nazaiah Caravallo	So
DB	27	Jahren Altura	Fr
DB	28	Marquis Richardson	Fr
DB	29	Kainoa Ontai	Jr
DB	30	Avin Houston	Fr
LB	31	Aisiah Paogofie	Fr
DB	34	Brayden Correa	Fr
LB	35	Junior Fiaui	So
DB	36	Jordan Fetu	Jr
LB	39	Zion Vea	Fr
LB	43	Alika Cavaco-Avoy	So
LB	47	Kingston Costales	Fr
LB	48	Kolo Kaululaau	Jr
LB	49	Tasi Tadio	Jr
DL	52	Luther McCoy (injured)	GS
DL	55	Zoram Petelo	So
DL	56	Spencer Elliott	Sr
DL	88	Elijah Williams	Jr
DL	90	Haʻaheo Dela Cruz (injured)	So
DL	91	Josh Sagapolutele	Jr
DL	92	Waipehe Winchester	So
DL	95	Geoffrey Speight Jr.	Sr
DL	96	Iosefa Letuli	So
DL	97	Jordan Lynch	So
DL	98	Tonga Paea	Jr
DL	99	Ozzy Pollard	So

Special teams

Pos.	#	Name	Class
PK	16	Hudson Borsari	Fr
P	23	Bryce Milford	So
LS	33	Jack Mowrey	Jr
P	43	Gannon Miller	Fr
LS	45	Nick Pang	Sr
P	47	Gehrig Heil	Fr
PK, P	98	Sean Olvera-Harle	Sr

Head coach

- Timmy Chang

Coordinators/assistant coaches

- Chris Brown – Associate head coach/linebackers
- Anthony Arceneaux – Offensive coordinator/running backs
- Dennis Thurman – Defensive coordinator
- Thomas Sheffield – Special teams coordinator
- Jared Ursua – Pass game coordinator/wide receivers
- Chad Kapanui – Quarterbacks
- Derek Faavi – Offensive line
- Jeremy Kerr – Tight ends
- Lance Samuseva – Defensive tackles
- Jordan Puʻu-Robinson – Defensive ends
- Nick Locher – Safeties
- PJ Minaya – Cornerbacks
- William Overstreet – Assistant wide receivers
- Winterhawk Leighton – Assistant offensive line
- Regan Divina – Assistant linebackers

Legend

- (C) Team captain
- (S) Suspended
- (I) Ineligible
- Injured
- Redshirt

Roster
Last update: 2026-09-03

== Game summaries ==
=== at Stanford ===
Hawaii Rainbow Warriors (0–0) at Stanford Cardinal (0–0) – Game summary

Quarter	1	2	3	4	Total
Rainbow Warriors	0	7	0	20	27
Cardinal	7	7	9	14	37

at Stanford Stadium • Stanford, California

- Date: August 29
- Game time: 1:00 p.m.
- Game weather: Sunny
- Game attendance: 23,222
- Referee: Brad Carrell
- TV announcers (ACCN): Jorge Sedano (play-by-play), Rodney McLeod (analyst) and Kendra Douglas (sideline)
- Box score

Game information

First quarter

- STAN – Micah Ford 2-yard run (Emmet Kenney kick), 8:37. Cardinal 7–0. Drive: 9 plays, 89 yards, 4:08.

Second quarter

- HAW – DeVon Rice 3-yard run (Sean Olvera-Harle kick), 10:18. Tied 7–7. Drive: 8 plays, 55 yards, 3:55.
- STAN – Atticus Joseph 6-yard pass from Davis Warren (Emmet Kenney kick), 7:02. Cardinal 14–7. Drive: 8 plays, 75 yards, 3:16.

Third quarter

- STAN – Team Safety, 13:32. Cardinal 16–7.
- STAN – Micah Ford 2-yard run (Emmet Kenney kick), 9:51. Cardinal 23–7. Drive: 8 plays, 64 yards, 3:30.

Fourth quarter

- HAW – Sitani Mikaele 5-yard run (Tama Uiliata run), 12:43. Cardinal 23–15. Drive: 16 plays, 80 yards, 5:14.
- HAW – Tama Uiliata 11-yard pass from Micah Alejado (pass failed), 9:39. Cardinal 23–21. Drive: 5 plays, 63 yards, 1:31.
- HAW – DeVon Rice 29-yard pass from Micah Alejado (Sean Olvera-Harle kick failed), 4:06. Rainbow Warriors 27–23. Drive: 9 plays, 90 yards, 3:12.
- STAN – Micah Ford 2-yard run (Emmet Kenney kick), 1:41. Cardinal 30–27. Drive: 7 plays, 60 yards, 2:18.
- STAN – Tevarua Tafiti 31-yard fumble return (Emmet Kenney kick), 1:12. Cardinal 37–27.

Statistics	HAW	STAN
First downs	18	21
Plays–yards	74–322	71–483
Rushes–yards	22–46	37–173
Passing yards	276	310
Passing: comp–att–int	31–52–0	22–34–0
Turnovers	1	0
Time of possession	29:06	30:54

Team	Category	Player	Statistics
Hawaii	Passing	Micah Alejado	30/50, 269 yards, 2 TD
Hawaii	Rushing	DeVon Rice	11 carries, 35 yards, TD
Hawaii	Receiving	Kainoa Carvalho	5 receptions, 72 yards
Stanford	Passing	Davis Warren	22/34, 310 yards, TD
Stanford	Rushing	Micah Ford	25 carries, 99 yards, 3 TD
Stanford	Receiving	JonAnthony Hall	2 receptions, 81 yards

=== UNLV ===
UNLV Rebels (0–1) at Hawaii Rainbow Warriors (0–1) – Game summary

Quarter	1	2	3	4	Total
Rebels	7	7	0	7	21
Rainbow Warriors	0	3	3	0	6

at Clarence T. C. Ching Athletics Complex • Honolulu, Hawaii

- Date: September 5
- Game time: 4:00 p.m.
- Game weather: Sunny, 81 °F (27 °C)
- Game attendance: 15,014
- Referee: Patrick Foy
- TV announcers (The CW): Chris Fisher (play-by-play), Cody Kessler (analyst) and Marshall Newhouse (sideline)
- Box score

Game information

First quarter

- UNLV – Jackson Arnold 7-yard run (Ramon Villela kick), 9:33. Rebels 7–0. Drive: 8 plays, 80 yards, 3:07.

Second quarter

- HAW – Sean Olvera-Harle 39-yard field goal, 14:09. Rebels 7–3. Drive: 11 plays, 46 yards, 7:03.
- UNLV – Jackson Arnold 2-yard run, 1:33. Rebels 14–3. Drive: 8 plays, 74 yards, 2:19.

Third quarter

- HAW – Sean Olvera-Harle 33-yard field goal, 1:32. 'Rebels 14–6. Drive: 14 plays, 74 yards, 6:31.

Fourth quarter

- UNLV – Jai'Den Thomas 50-yard run (Ramon Villela kick), 4:51. Rebels 21–6. Drive: 1 play, 50 yards, 0:11.

Statistics	UNLV	HAW
First downs	18	20
Plays–yards	61–364	76–294
Rushes–yards	43–248	33–118
Passing yards	116	176
Passing: comp–att–int	8–18–0	17–43–1
Turnovers	0	1
Time of possession	27:55	32:05

Team	Category	Player	Statistics
UNLV	Passing	Jackson Arnold	8/18, 116 yards
UNLV	Rushing	Jai'Den Thomas	20 carries, 143 yards, TD
UNLV	Receiving	Keyan Burnett	3 receptions, 55 yards
Hawaii	Passing	Micah Alejado	17/41, 176 yards, INT
Hawaii	Rushing	DeVon Rice	15 carries, 73 yards
Hawaii	Receiving	DeVon Rice	4 receptions, 27 yards

=== New Mexico State ===
New Mexico State Aggies (1–1) at Hawaii Rainbow Warriors (0–2) – Game summary

Quarter	1	2	3	4	Total
Aggies	0	13	6	0	19
Rainbow Warriors	9	10	3	7	29

at Clarence T. C. Ching Athletics Complex • Honolulu, Hawaii

- Date: September 12
- Game time: 6:00 p.m.
- Game weather: Sunny • Temperature: 81 °F (27 °C) • Wind: NE 13 mph
- Game attendance: 12,905
- Referee: Kenneth Ray
- TV announcers (KFVE): Kanoa Leahey (play-by-play), Rich Miano (analyst), Cienna Pilotin and Kyle Chinen (sideline reporters)
- Box score

Game information

First quarter

- HAW – DeVon Rice 7-yard run (Sean Olvera-Harle kick failed), 8:41. Rainbow Warriors 6–0. Drive: 8 plays, 64 yards, 3:37.
- HAW – Sean Olvera-Harle 32-yard field goal, 4:28. 'Rainbow Warriors 9–0. Drive: 6 plays, 59 yards, 2:10.

Second quarter

- HAW – DeVon Rice 11-yard run (Sean Olvera-Harle kick), 13:37. Rainbow Warriors 16–0. Drive: 6 plays, 71 yards, 2:45.
- NMSU – James Jones 2-yard run (pass failed), 10:02. Rainbow Warriors 16–6. Drive: 8 plays, 65 yards, 3:35.
- NMSU – TK King 33-yard pass from Trey Hedden (Ilya Uvaydov kick), 1:17. Rainbow Warriors 16–13. Drive: 10 plays, 81 yards, 2:51.
- HAW – Sean Olvera-Harle 44-yard field goal, 0:11. Rainbow Warriors 19–13. Drive: 9 plays, 51 yards, 1:06.

Third quarter

- NMSU – De'Marcus Peters 84-yard fumble return (Ilya Uvaydov kick blocked), 13:15. Tied 19–19.
- HAW – Sean Olvera-Harle 33-yard field goal, 8:46. Rainbow Warriors 22–19. Drive: 11 plays, 57 yards, 4:23.

Fourth quarter

- HAW – Frank Abreu 7-yard pass from Tama Uiliata (Sean Olvera-Harle kick), 5:41. Rainbow Warriors 29–19. Drive: 10 plays, 46 yards, 5:35.

Statistics	NMSU	HAW
First downs	23	21
Plays–yards	66–380	72–420
Rushes–yards	31–124	26–67
Passing yards	256	353
Passing: comp–att–int	19–35–2	34–46–0
Turnovers	3	1
Time of possession	27:47	32:13

Team	Category	Player	Statistics
New Mexico State	Passing	Trey Hedden	19/35, 256 yards, TD, 2 INT
New Mexico State	Rushing	James Jones	13 carries, 78 yards, TD
New Mexico State	Receiving	TK King	4 receptions, 67 yards, TD
Hawaii	Passing	Micah Alejado	33/45, 346 yards
Hawaii	Rushing	DeVon Rice	16 carries, 59 yards, 2 TD
Hawaii	Receiving	Tama Uiliata	10 receptions, 107 yards

=== at Wyoming (rivalry) ===
Hawaii Rainbow Warriors (1–2) at Wyoming Cowboys (1–1) – Game summary

Quarter	1	2	3	4	Total
Rainbow Warriors	3	0	0	7	10
Cowboys	3	10	0	14	27

at War Memorial Stadium • Laramie, Wyoming

- Date: September 26
- Game time: 9:00 a.m.
- Game weather: Cloudy • Temperature: 74 °F (23 °C) • Wind: W at 16 miles per hour (26 km/h)
- Game attendance: 20,999
- Referee: Marcus Thornton
- TV announcers (The CW): Chris Fisher (play-by-play), Cody Kessler (analyst) and Marshall Newhouse (sideline)
- Box score

Game information

First quarter

- WYO – Erik Sandvik 28-yard field goal, 10:13. Cowboys 3–0. Drive: 11 plays, 64 yards, 4:47.
- HAW – Sean Olvera-Harle 28-yard field goal, 5:27. Tied 3–3. Drive: 12 plays, 55 yards, 4:46.

Second quarter

- WYO – Erik Sandvik 23-yard field goal, 10:04. Cowboys 6–3. Drive: 11 plays, 65 yards, 5:25.
- WYO – Markell Holman 1-yard run (Erik Sandvik kick), 3:05. Cowboys 13–3. Drive: 7 plays, 60 yards, 3:07.

Fourth quarter

- WYO – Markell Holman 18-yard run (Erik Sandvick kick), 14:52. Cowboys 20–3. Drive: 11 plays, 99 yards, 5:54.
- HAW – Devon Tauaefa 20-yard pass from Micah Alejado (Sean Olvera-Harle kick), 12:11. Cowboys 20–10. Drive: 7 plays, 75 yards, 2:41.
- WYO – Samuel Harris 18–yard run (Erik Sandvik kick), 1:46. Cowboys 27–10. Drive: 7 plays, 63 yards, 2:50.

Statistics	HAW	WYO
First downs	22	23
Plays–yards	67–328	61–387
Rushes–yards	23–102	38–183
Passing yards	226	204
Passing: comp–att–int	28–44–0	17–23–0
Turnovers	0	0
Time of possession	27:57	32:03

Team	Category	Player	Statistics
Hawaii	Passing	Micah Alejado	28/44, 226 yards, TD
Hawaii	Rushing	DeVon Rice	11 carries, 75 yards
Hawaii	Receiving	Tama Uiliata	6 receptions, 39 yards
Wyoming	Passing	Tyler Hughes	17/23, 204 yards
Wyoming	Rushing	Samuel Harris	11 carries, 94 yards, TD
Wyoming	Receiving	Deion DeBlanc	3 receptions, 41 yards

=== San Jose State (Dick Tomey Legacy Game) ===
San Jose State Spartans (2–2) at Hawaii Rainbow Warriors (1–3) – Game summary

Quarter	1	2	3	4	Total
Spartans	0	14	3	3	20
Rainbow Warriors	0	0	13	3	16

at Clarence T. C. Ching Athletics Complex • Honolulu, Hawaii

- Date: October 3, 2026
- Game time: 5:59 p.m.
- Game weather: 80 °F (27 °C)
- Referee: Cal McNeill
- TV announcers (KFVE): Kanoa Leahey (play-by-play), Rich Miano (analyst), Cienna Pilotin and Kyle Chinen (sideline reporters)
- Box score

Game information

Second quarter

- SJSU – Kamaehu Kopa-Kaawalauole 10-yard pass from Luke Weaver (Trajan Sinatra kick), 12:01. Spartans 7–0. Drive: 3 plays, 20 yards, 1:04.
- SJSU – Carson Clark 12-yard pass from Luke Weaver (Trajan Sinatra kick), 6:08. Spartans 14–0. Drive: 7 plays, 73 yards, 2:56.

Third quarter

- HAW – Sean Olvera-Harle 44-yard field goal, 11:46. Spartans 14–3. Drive: 6 plays, 49 yards, 3:14.
- HAW – Sean Olvera-Harle 24-yard field goal, 5:14. Spartans 14–6. Drive: 11 plays, 79 yards, 4:40.
- HAW – Devin Alves 58-yard pass from Micah Alejado (Sean Olvera-Harle kick), 3:20. Spartans 14–13. Drive: 2 plays, 61 yards, 0:52.
- SJSU – Trajan Sinatra 24-yard field goal, 0:24. Spartans 17–13. Drive: 7 plays, 68 yards, 2:56.

Fourth quarter

- HAW – Sean Olvera-Harle 44-yard field goal, 11:52. Spartans 17–16. Drive: 8 plays, 49 yards, 3:32.
- SJSU – Trajan Sinatra 30-yard field goal, 1:15. Spartans 20–16. Drive: 12 plays, 26 yards, 5:31.

Statistics	SJSU	HAW
First downs	16	18
Plays–yards	62–324	68–438
Rushes–yards	34–78	25–97
Passing yards	246	341
Passing: Comp–Att–Int	19–28–0	23–38–2
Turnovers	0	2
Time of possession	29:59	30:01

Team	Category	Player	Statistics
San Jose State	Passing	Luke Weaver	19/28, 246 yards, 2 TD
San Jose State	Rushing	Jabari Bates	27 carries, 74 yards
San Jose State	Receiving	Carson Clark	5 receptions, 74 yards, TD
Hawaii	Passing	Micah Alejado	23/35, 341 yards, TD, 2 INT
Hawaii	Rushing	Micah Alejado	12 carries, 36 yards
Hawaii	Receiving	Devin Alves	3 receptions, 121 yards, TD

=== at Arizona State ===
Hawaii Rainbow Warriors (1–4) at Arizona State Sun Devils (2–2) – Game summary

Quarter	1	2	3	4	Total
Rainbow Warriors	3	3	0	6	12
Sun Devils	7	10	7	6	30

at Mountain America Stadium • Tempe, Arizona

- Date: October 10
- Game time: 4:30 p.m.
- Game weather: 79 °F (26 °C)
- Game attendance: 47,931
- Referee: Cravonne Barrett
- TV announcers (FS1): Dan Hellie (play-by-play) and Robert Smith (analyst)
- Box score

Game information

First quarter

- HAW – Sean Olvera-Harle 44-yard field goal, 13:41. Rainbow Warriors 3–0. Drive: 5 plays, 49 yards, 1:19.
- ASU – Reed Harris 18-yard pass from Cutter Boley (Carson Smith kick), 8:13. Sun Devils 7–3. Drive: 10 plays, 79 yards, 5:17.

Second quarter

- ASU – Cardae Mack 1-yard run (Carson Smith kick), 9:56. Sun Devils 14–3. Drive: 6 plays, 67 yards, 1:36.
- HAW – Sean Olvera-Harle 30-yard field goal, 1:22. Sun Devils 14–6. Drive: 11 plays, 80 yards, 4:40.
- ASU – Carson Smith 47-yard field goal, 0:15. 8 plays, 37 yards, 1:00. Sun Devils 17–6.

Third quarter

- ASU – Cardae Mack 67-yard run (Carson Smith kick), 0:51. Sun Devils 24–6. 5 plays, 96 yards, 1:57.

Fourth quarter

- HAW – Audric Harris 32-yard pass from Micah Alejado (pass failed), 12:35. Sun Devils 24–12. Drive: 9 plays, 75 yards, 3:16.
- ASU – Reed Harris 9-yard pass from Cutter Boley (pass failed), 1:55. Sun Devils 30–12. Drive: 9 plays, 79 yards, 5:58.

Statistics	HAW	ASU
First downs	21	21
Plays–yards	73–316	61–420
Rushes–yards	22–64	30–231
Passing yards	252	189
Passing: comp–att–int	26–51–1	21–31–0
Time of possession	31:17	28:43

Team	Category	Player	Statistics
Hawaii	Passing	Micah Alejado	26/49, 252 yards, TD, INT
Hawaii	Rushing	DeVon Rice	6 carries, 28 yards
Hawaii	Receiving	Kainoa Carvalho	7 receptions, 86 yards
Arizona State	Passing	Cutter Boley	21/31, 189 yards, 2 TD
Arizona State	Rushing	Cardae Mack	13 carries, 154 yards, 2 TD
Arizona State	Receiving	Reed Harris	8 receptions, 91 yards, 2 TD

=== New Mexico ===
New Mexico Lobos (4–1) at Hawaii Rainbow Warriors (1–5) – Game summary

Quarter	1	2	3	4	Total
Lobos	0	0	7	14	21
Rainbow Warriors	3	7	0	0	10

at Clarence T. C. Ching Athletics Complex • Honolulu, Hawaii

- Date: October 17
- Game time: 4:30 p.m.
- Game weather: 84 °F (29 °C)
- Game attendance: 12,941
- Referee: Brad Carrell
- TV announcers (FS1): Carlo Jiménez (play-by-play) and Robert Smith (analyst)
- Box score

Game information

First quarter

- HAW – Sean Olvera-Harle 27-yard field goal, 7:51. Rainbow Warriors 3–0. Drive: 9 plays, 40 yards, 3:15.

Second quarter

- HAW – Titan Lacaden 1-yard pass from Micah Alejado (Sean Olvera-Harle kick), 0:06. Rainbow Warriors 10–0. Drive: 9 plays, 46 yards, 1:47.

Third quarter

- UNM – Scottre Humphrey 1-yard run (Grant Glasgow kick), 9:43. Rainbow Warriors 10–7. Drive: 9 plays, 75 yards, 5:17.

Fourth quarter

- UNM – Toa Faʻavae 21-yard run (Grant Glasgow kick), 6:57. Lobos 14–10. Drive: 12 plays, 80 yards, 7:04.
- UNM – Scottre Humphrey 49-yard run (Grant Glasgow kick), 3:24. Lobos 21–10. Drive: 1 play, 49 yards, 0:08.

Statistics	UNM	HAW
First downs	16	20
Plays–yards	59–337	67–298
Rushes–yards	48–243	27–48
Passing yards	94	250
Passing: comp–att–int	6–11–2	23–40–1
Turnovers	3	2
Time of possession	31:56	28:04

Team	Category	Player	Statistics
New Mexico	Passing	Toa Fa'avae	5/10, 59 yards, 2 INT
New Mexico	Rushing	Scottre Humphrey	15 carries, 90 yards, 2 TD
New Mexico	Receiving	Toa Fa'avae	1 reception, 35 yards
Hawaii	Passing	Micah Alejado	23/40, 250 yards, TD, INT
Hawaii	Rushing	Cam Barfield	12 carries, 34 yards
Hawaii	Receiving	Devin Alves	5 receptions, 76 yards

=== at Northern Illinois ===
Hawaii Rainbow Warriors (1–6) vs Northern Illinois Huskies (0–6) – Game summary

Quarter	1	2	3	4	Total
Rainbow Warriors	14	21	14	7	56
Huskies	7	7	0	7	21

at Huskie Stadium • DeKalb, Illinois

- Date: October 24
- Game time: 9:30 a.m.
- Game weather: Sunny
- Game attendance: 7,650
- Referee: Kenneth Ray
- TV announcers (KFVE): Kanoa Leahey (play-by-play) and Rich Miano (analyst)
- Box score

Game information

First quarter

- HAW – DeVon Rice 2-yard run (Sean Olvera-Harle kick), 9:13. Rainbow Warriors 7–0. Drive: 12 plays, 75 yards, 5:47.
- NIU – DeAree Rogers 49-yard pass from Taron Dickens (JJ Schlenhardt kick), 6:49. Tied 7–7. Drive: 5 plays, 77 yards, 2:17.
- HAW – Frank Abreu 13-yard pass from Micah Alejado (Sean Olvera-Harle kick), 3:43. Rainbow Warriors 14–7. Drive: 6 plays, 75 yards, 3:06.

Second quarter

- NIU – DeAree Rogers 25-yard pass from Taron Dickens (JJ Schlenhardt kick), 13:46. Tied 14–14. Drive: 4 plays, 39 yards, 1:55.
- HAW – DeVon Rice 33-yard run (Sean Olvera-Harle kick), 11:17. Rainbow Warriors 21–14. Drive: 5 plays, 75 yards, 2:29.
- HAW – Cam Barfield 1-yard run (Sean Olvera-Harle kick), 5:27. Rainbow Warriors 28–14. Drive: 10 plays, 93 yards, 4:29.
- HAW – Frank Abreu 12-yard pass from Micah Alejado (Sean Olvera-Harle kick), 0:23. Rainbow Warriors 35–14. Drive: 5 plays, 67 yards, 1:45.

Third quarter

- HAW – DeVon Rice 5-yard run (Sean Olvera-Harle kick), 7:51. Rainbow Warriors 42–14. Drive: 5 plays, 35 yards, 2:36.
- HAW – Josiah Fetui 44-yard pass from Micah Alejado (Sean Olvera-Harle kick), 1:12. Rainbow Warriors 49–14. Drive: 11 plays, 80 yards, 5:40.

Fourth quarter

- NIU – Elijah Porter 3-yard run (JJ Schlenhardt kick), 8:55. Rainbow Warriors 49–21. Drive: 8 plays, 51 yards, 4:11.
- HAW – TJ Foʻilefutu 6-yard run (Sean Olvera-Harle kick), 3:16. Rainbow Warriors 56–21. Drive: 5 plays, 18 yards, 3:00.

Statistics	HAW	NIU
First downs	24	14
Plays–yards	76–504	50–266
Rushes–yards	42–175	24–95
Passing yards	329	171
Passing: comp–att–int	23–34–1	17–26–2
Turnovers	1	4
Time of possession	37:44	22:16

Team	Category	Player	Statistics
Hawaii	Passing	Micah Alejado	22/32, 323 yards, 3 TD, INT
Hawaii	Rushing	DeVon Rice	12 carries, 71 yards, 3 TD
Hawaii	Receiving	Audric Harris	2 receptions, 90 yards
Northern Illinois	Passing	Taron Dickens	17/26, 171 yards, 2 TD, 2 INT
Northern Illinois	Rushing	Telly Johnson Jr.	14 carries, 63 yards
Northern Illinois	Receiving	DeAree Rogers	8 receptions, 115 yards, 2 TD

=== at UTEP ===
Hawaii Rainbow Warriors (2–6) vs UTEP Miners (1–7) – Game summary

Quarter	1	2	3	4	Total
Rainbow Warriors	7	3	0	7	17
Miners	0	7	0	7	14

at Sun Bowl • El Paso, Texas

- Date: November 7
- Game time: 4:30 p.m.
- Game weather: 52 °F (11 °C)
- Game attendance: 8,581
- Referee: Marcus Thornton
- TV announcers (FS1): Carlo Jiménez (play-by-play) and Petros Papadakis (analyst)
- Box score

Game information

First quarter

- HAW – Titan Lacaden 20-yard pass from Micah Alejado (Sean Olvera-Harle kick), 2:57. Rainbow Warriors 7–0. Drive: 5 plays, 77 yards, 1:54.

Second quarter

- HAW – Sean Olvera-Harle 20-yard field goal, 7:01. Rainbow Warriors 10–0. Drive: 18 plays, 91 yards, 8:11.
- UTEP – Lamar Sperling 5-yard run (Carlos Arreola kick), 6:25. Rainbow Warriors 10–7. Drive: 3 plays, 65 yards, 0:36.

Fourth quarter

- HAW – Sitani Mikaele 6-yard run (Sean Olvera-Harle kick), 10:08. Rainbow Warriors 17–7. Drive: 12 plays, 98 yards, 6:18.
- UTEP – Judah Ezinwa 15-yard pass from Raymond Moore III (Carlos Arreola kick), 6:57. Rainbow Warriors 17–14. Drive: 7 plays, 79 yards, 3:05.

Statistics	HAW	UTEP
First downs	27	17
Plays–yards	78–474	49–288
Rushes–yards	38–121	31–179
Passing yards	303	109
Passing: comp–att–int	26–40–1	9–18–0
Turnovers	2	1
Time of possession	36:35	23:25

Team	Category	Player	Statistics
Hawaii	Passing	Micah Alejado	26/39, 303 yards, TD, INT
Hawaii	Rushing	Cam Barfield	15 carries, 64 yards
Hawaii	Receiving	Titan Lacaden	11 receptions, 109 yards
UTEP	Passing	Raymond Moore III	9/18, 109 yards, TD
UTEP	Rushing	Lamar Sperling	11 carries, 63 yards, TD
UTEP	Receiving	Carver Cheeks	2 receptions, 46 yards

=== North Dakota State ===
North Dakota State Bison (7–2) at Hawaii Rainbow Warriors (3–6) – Game summary

Quarter	1	2	3	4	Total
Bison	7	0	0	14	21
Rainbow Warriors	0	7	6	0	13

at Clarence T. C. Ching Athletics Complex • Honolulu, Hawaii

- Date: November 14
- Game time: 6:00 p.m.
- Game weather: 81 °F (27 °C)
- Game attendance: 15,014
- Referee: Christian Watson
- TV announcers (The CW): Chris Fisher (play-by-play), Isaiah Stanback (analyst) and Bryan Walters (sideline)

Game information

First quarter

- NDSU – Mekhi Collins 7-yard pass from Nathan Hayes (Drew Klein kick), 4:20. Bison 7–0. Drive: 2 plays, 11 yards, 0:41.

Second quarter

- HAW – DeVon Rice 15-yard run (Sean Olvera-Harle kick), 0:04. Tied 7–7. Drive: 7 plays, 59 yards, 2:05.

Third quarter

- HAW – Sean Olvera-Harle 28-yard field goal, 7:54. Rainbow Warriors 10–7. Drive: 8 plays, 41 yards, 3:07.
- HAW – Sean Olvera-Harle 33-yard field goal, 2:16. Rainbow Warriors 13–7. Drive: 10 plays, 25 yards, 3:42.

Fourth quarter

- NDSU – DJ Scott 1-yard run (Drew Klein kick), 8:34. Bison 14–13. Drive: 16 plays, 77 yards, 8:37.
- NDSU – Ray James 49-yard interception return (Drew Klein kick), 6:27. Bison 21–13.

Statistics	NDSU	HAW
First downs	12	17
Plays–yards	56–183	73–262
Rushes–yards	36–86	26–31
Passing yards	97	231
Passing: comp–att–int	13–20–0	31–47–2
Turnovers	0	2
Time of possession	30:47	29:13

Team	Category	Player	Statistics
North Dakota State	Passing	Nathan Hayes	13/20, 97 yards, TD
North Dakota State	Rushing	DJ Scott	13 carries, 35 yards, TD
North Dakota State	Receiving	Mekhi Collins	4 receptions, 34 yards, TD
Hawaii	Passing	Micah Alejado	31/47, 231 yards, 2 INT
Hawaii	Rushing	DeVon Rice	4 carries, 26 yards, TD
Hawaii	Receiving	Kainoa Carvalho	7 receptions, 63 yards

=== at Nevada ===
Hawaii Rainbow Warriors (3–7) at Nevada Wolf Pack (4–6) – Game summary

Quarter	1	2	3	4	Total
Rainbow Warriors	0	0	0	0	0
Wolf Pack	0	0	0	0	0

at Mackay Stadium • Reno, Nevada

- Date: November 21
- Game weather: -
- Game attendance: -
- Referee: -
- TV announcers (FS1): Trent Rush (play-by-play) and Sherdrick Bonner (analyst)

Game information

First quarter
Second quarter
Third quarter
Fourth quarter

Statistics	HAW	NEV
First downs		
Plays–yards		
Rushes–yards		
Passing yards		
Passing: comp–att–int		
Turnovers		
Time of possession		

Team	Category	Player	Statistics
Hawaii	Passing		
Hawaii	Rushing		
Hawaii	Receiving		
Nevada	Passing		
Nevada	Rushing		
Nevada	Receiving		

=== Sacramento State ===
Sacramento State Hornets (2–9) at Hawaii Rainbow Warriors (0–0) – Game summary

Quarter	1	2	3	4	Total
Hornets	0	0	0	0	0
Rainbow Warriors	0	0	0	0	0

at Clarence T. C. Ching Athletics Complex • Honolulu, Hawaii

- Date: November 28
- Game time: 6:00 p.m.

Game information

First quarter

Second quarter

Third quarter

Fourth quarter

Statistics	SAC	HAW
First downs		
Plays–yards		
Rushes–yards		
Passing yards		
Passing: comp–att–int		
Turnovers		
Time of possession		

Team	Category	Player	Statistics
Sacramento State	Passing		
Sacramento State	Rushing		
Sacramento State	Receiving		
Hawaii	Passing		
Hawaii	Rushing		
Hawaii	Receiving		

== Rankings ==
Ranking movements Legend: ██ Increase in ranking ██ Decrease in ranking — = Not ranked RV = Received votes
	Week																
Poll	Pre	1	2	3	4	5	6	7	8	9	10	11	12	13	14	15	Final
AP	—	—	—	—													
Coaches	RV	—	—	—													
CFP	Not released																Not released
