= Cole Ballard =

American football player

No. 15 – Kansas Jayhawks
- Position: Quarterback
- Class: Redshirt Junior

Personal information
- Listed height: 6 ft 2 in (1.88 m)
- Listed weight: 220 lb (100 kg)

Career information
- High school: Westfield (Westfield, Indiana)
- College: Kansas (2023–present)
- Stats at ESPN

Cole Ballard is an American college football quarterback for the Kansas Jayhawks.

== Early life ==
Ballard attended Westfield High School in Westfield, Indiana. As a senior, he threw for 1,654 yards and 11 touchdowns while rushing for 655 yards and 13 touchdowns. Following his graduation, Ballard committed to play college football at the University of Kansas as a walk-on.

== College career ==
Ballard entered the 2023 season as the third-string quarterback behind Jalon Daniels and Jason Bean. Following injuries to Daniels and Bean, Ballard received his first significant playing time against Texas Tech, completing 9 of 20 passes for 124 yards and an interception. He made his first career start against Kansas State the following week, throwing for 162 yards, one touchdown, and two interceptions in a 31–27 loss to the rival Wildcats. Ballard finished the 2023 season with 286 passing yards, one touchdown, and three interceptions. He played sparingly during his redshirt freshman season in 2024 as Jalon Daniels's backup. In 2025, Ballard completed 10 passes for 108 yards and a touchdown while rushing for 92 yards on 15 carries.

Entering the 2026 season, Ballard competed with Isaiah Marshall for Kansas's starting quarterback position.

=== Statistics ===
Season	Team	Games			Passing								Rushing			
Season	Team	GP	GS	Record	Cmp	Att	Pct	Yds	Avg	TD	Int	Rtg	Att	Yds	Avg	TD
2023	Kansas	4	1	0–1	20	36	55.6	286	7.9	1	3	114.8	20	75	3.8	0
2024	Kansas	3	0	0–0	5	6	83.3	51	8.5	1	0	209.7	5	42	8.4	0
2025	Kansas	8	0	0–0	10	22	45.5	108	4.9	1	1	92.6	15	92	6.1	0
2026	Kansas	4	1	0–1	25	43	58.1	381	8.9	1	1	135.6	14	50	3.6	0
Career		19	2	0−2	60	107	56.1	826	7.7	4	5	123.9	54	259	4.8	0

== Personal life ==
Ballard is the son of Chris Ballard, the former general manager of the Indianapolis Colts.
