= Union Jack Classic =

Planned series of American college football games in London, England

- Status: Active
- Genre: College football
- Frequency: Annual
- Venue: Wembley Stadium
- Locations: London, England, United Kingdom
- Years active: 2026–present
- Inaugurated: September 19, 2026

The Union Jack Classic is a series of neutral-site American football games featuring NCAA Division I FBS programs, played annually in London, England. The inaugural game took place on September 19, 2026, at Wembley Stadium, matching the Kansas Jayhawks against the Arizona State Sun Devils in a Big 12 Conference matchup, as part of a multi-year agreement to stage the event in London.

== Background ==
The Big 12 has emphasized international expansion under commissioner Brett Yormark. Coverage of the Union Jack Classic described the London series as aligned with that effort, with additional Big 12 matchups under discussion beyond 2026. Industry reporting also indicated that a presale window for each participating school's alumni and season-ticket holders was expected before general on-sale.

The Union Jack Classic was the first FBS game held in England and only the second college football game played in London; the first was the Imperial Bowl at Crystal Palace National Sports Centre on October 16, 1988, in which Richmond defeated Boston University 20–17.

== Games ==
Date	Winning team	Score	Losing team	Venue	City	Attendance
September 19, 2026	Arizona State	24–17	Kansas	Wembley Stadium	London	46,523

== See also ==
- College football in Ireland
- List of college football games played outside the United States
- NFL International Series
