= Del Valle High School =

Del Valle High School can refer to:

- Del Valle High School (El Paso, Texas)
- Del Valle High School (Travis County, Texas)
