= Jake Fette =

American football player

No. 2 – Arizona State Sun Devils
- Position: Quarterback
- Class: Freshman

Personal information
- Listed height: 6 ft 1 in (1.85 m)
- Listed weight: 190 lb (86 kg)

Career information
- High school: Del Valle (El Paso, Texas)
- College: Arizona State (2026–present)

Jake Fette is an American college football quarterback for the Arizona State Sun Devils.

== Early life ==
Fette attended Del Valle High School in El Paso, Texas. As a sophomore, he was the Texas District 1-5A D-I Overall MVP after passing for 2,465 yards with 27 touchdowns and rushing for 13 touchdowns. As a junior, Fette was named the El Paso Times Most Valuable Player after passing for 2,488 yards with 32 touchdowns and only one interception and rushing for 589 yards and 11 touchdowns. As a senior, he passed for 2,737 yards with 28 touchdowns and rushed for 1,105 yards with 18 touchdowns.

A four-star recruit, Fette was ranked among the best quarterbacks in his class and was selected to play in the Elite 11 Finals. He committed to Arizona State University to play college football and officially signed in December 2025.

=== Statistics ===
Year	Team	Games			Passing								Rushing			
Year	Team	GP	GS	Record	Cmp	Att	Pct	Yds	Y/A	TD	INT	Rtg	Atts	Yds	Avg	TD
2026	Arizona State	5	3	2-1	60	105	57.1	607	5.8	3	0	115.2	30	23	0.8	0
Career		5	3	2-1	60	105	57.1	607	5.8	3	0	115.2	30	23	0.8	0
