= Yasin Willis =

American football player (born 2004)

No. 6 – Kansas Jayhawks
- Position: Running back
- Class: Junior

Personal information
- Born: September 17, 2004 (age 22)
- Listed height: 6 ft 1 in (1.85 m)
- Listed weight: 235 lb (107 kg)

Career information
- High school: Saint Joseph Regional (Bergen County, New Jersey)
- College: Syracuse (2024–2025); Kansas (2026–present)
- Stats at ESPN

Yasin Willis (born September 17, 2004) is an American college football running back for the Kansas Jayhawks. He previously played for the Syracuse Orange.

== Early life ==
Willis grew up in Newark, New Jersey and played youth football for the Brick City Lions, East Orange Jaguars, Operation Teen Titans, and was nicknamed Night Train.

He attended high school at Saint Joseph Regional located in Bergen County, New Jersey. Coming out of high school, he was rated as a four-star recruit, and the top overall player in the State of New Jersey, where he committed to play college football for the Pittsburgh Panthers. However, he later flipped his commitment and signed to play for the Syracuse Orange.

== College career ==
=== Syracuse ===
In week six of the 2024 season, he ran for 62 yards and a touchdown in a victory over UNLV. During his freshman season in 2024, Willis rushed for 130 yards and a touchdown on 36 carries. He entered the 2025 season, as one of the team's top running back competing for playing time.

On December 23, 2025, Willis announced that he would enter the NCAA transfer portal.

=== Kansas ===
On January 7, 2026, Willis announced that he would transfer to Kansas.
