= Del Valle High School (El Paso, Texas) =

Location
- 950 Bordeaux Drive; El Paso, Texas 79907; United States; 31°41′33″N 106°17′48″W

Information
- Type: Public
- Motto: One Family, One Destiny. Big Bad Blue
- Established: 1987
- School district: Ysleta ISD
- Principal: Valerie Hairston
- Teaching staff: 107.73 (on FTE basis)
- Grades: 9 to 12
- Enrollment: 1,798 (2024–2025)
- Student to teacher ratio: 16.69
- Colors: Navy Blue, Silver and White
- Athletics conference: 5A-D1
- Mascot: Conquistador
- Nickname: DVHS, DV
- Team name: Conquistadores
- Website: DVHS Home Page

Del Valle High is a public high school located on the southeast side of El Paso, Texas. DV, as it is commonly called, is part of the Ysleta Independent School District, serving 2,000 students in grades 9 to 12.

== History ==
The campus opened in August 1987 and recently celebrated its thirty-year anniversary in 2017. DV's first graduating class was in June 1990. The School is located very close to the US/Mexican border, and the population of Del Valle mostly Hispanic.

During 2006–2008, Del Valle High School had new additions built on to its existing campus which included: new roofing, new tennis courts, a new track around the football field, a three-storey state of the art science wing, a band and musical arts wing and a modern field house. A jumbotron was added to the football field in 2018.

== Academics ==
DVHS offers Multinational/Multimedia Business Magnet School within its campus. This program offers informative information for students that want to pursue a career with business and marketing. Some topics covered in this group are entrepreneurship, finance, marketing and business information tech. DVHS also offers CTE programs, such as Law Enforcement, Forensics, and Fire Science. DVHS offers a path into students interested in the healthcare field with a focus in biology via the Biomedical field and the BioTech program. DVHS offers various opportunities involving extracurriculars and other academics that can help students excel in their studies including Visual Arts, Fine Arts, Engineering, Theater, Music, Dance, Environmental Science, Media & Journalism, Sports, Writing, Drama, Culture studies, Family and Career services, STEM, JROTC, National Honor Society, English/Spanish, High Q, AV Tech, Math, Debate and Athletic Training.

== Athletics ==
In 2013, The Texas UIL changed the area schools from 4A to 5A and 5A to 6A division. As of 2014, Del Valle High School is in the UIL 2-5A division. The Boys varsity soccer team have won two Texas State Championships. Track & field coach Valerie Salazar-Hairston was honored by The El Paso Times as the Girls All City Track and Field Coach of the Year in 2010.

Del Valle also has an award-winning marching band that has made it to the UIL Texas State Marching Contest 3 times: 2003, 2005, and most recently 2009. The program has been successful in the NMSU Tournament of Bands, in Las Cruces, NM. The program has also attended the BOA Regionals and Super Regionals in El Paso and San Antonio, Texas.

== Notable alumni ==
- Jake Fette, football quarterback
- Steven Montez, Professional football player

== Feeder schools ==
- Del Valle Middle (Former Valley View Middle)
- Mission Valley Elementary
- Lancaster Elementary
- Del Valle Elementary
- Presa Elementary
- Alicia Chacon International
