= Cutter Boley =

American football player (born 2005)

No. 8 – Arizona State Sun Devils
- Position: Quarterback
- Class: (redshirt) Sophomore

Personal information
- Born: August 25, 2005 (age 21); Hodgenville, Kentucky, U.S.
- Listed height: 6 ft 5 in (1.96 m)
- Listed weight: 213 lb (97 kg)

Career information
- High school: Lexington Christian (Lexington, Kentucky)
- College: Kentucky (2024–2025); Arizona State (2026–present)
- Stats at ESPN

Cutter Boley (born August 25, 2005) is an American college football quarterback for the Arizona State Sun Devils. He previously played for the Kentucky Wildcats.

== Early life ==
Boley attended LaRue County High School in Hodgenville, Kentucky for his freshman and sophomore years in high school before transferring to Lexington Christian Academy in Lexington, Kentucky for his junior and senior years. As a junior, he threw for 3,901 yards with 36 touchdowns and was named the Class 2A player of the year by the Kentucky Football Coaches Association. As a senior, he had 2,187 passing yards and 24 touchdowns. Boley committed to the University of Kentucky to play college football.

== College career ==
=== Kentucky ===
Boley entered his true freshman season at Kentucky in 2024 competing with Gavin Wimsatt for the backup quarterback position behind starter Brock Vandagriff. He made his collegiate debut in the fourth quarter of Week 7 against Florida. On his first collegiate play and pass attempt, he was intercepted by Cormani McClain, who returned the pass for a touchdown. Boley finished the game without a completion on six attempts, with one interception. He made his next appearance in Week 10 against Murray State, entering to start the second half with Kentucky leading 24–0. He completed 10 of 14 passes for 130 yards and threw his first two collegiate touchdown passes, both to Anthony Brown, in the victory. The following week against No. 3 Texas, Boley replaced a benched Vandagriff at halftime. He completed 10 of 18 passes for 160 yards and one interception in the 31–14 loss. He started the regular-season finale against Louisville, completing six of 15 passes for 48 yards and two interceptions before leaving the game with an injury and being replaced by Wimsatt. On the season, he appeared in four games with one start, completing 26 of 53 passes for 338 yards, two touchdowns, and four interceptions while preserving his redshirt.

Entering the 2025 season, Boley competed with Zach Calzada for the starting quarterback position but was ultimately named the primary backup. In Week 2 against Ole Miss, Boley replaced an injured Calzada in the fourth quarter of a loss. He was named the starter the following week against Eastern Michigan, completing 12 of 21 passes for 240 yards and two touchdowns in a victory. Boley remained the starter for the rest of the season, even after Calzada was cleared to return. He started 10 of 11 games, completing 198 of 301 passes for 2,160 yards, 15 touchdowns, and 12 interceptions while adding 85 rushing yards and two touchdowns. Kentucky finished the season 5–7. On January 1, 2026, Boley entered the transfer portal.

=== Arizona State ===
On January 3, 2026, Boley committed to the Arizona State Sun Devils. Ahead of the 2026 season, he was named the starting quarterback by head coach Kenny Dillingham, winning the competition over fellow transfer Mikey Keene and freshman Jake Fette. In the season opener against Morgan State, Boley completed 21 of 27 passes for 387 yards and six touchdowns in just over a half of play, leading Arizona State to a 70–7 victory. His six touchdown passes were the most by an Arizona State quarterback since Andrew Walter threw six in 2004. Boley was named the Big 12 Co-Offensive Player of the Week for his performance.

=== Statistics ===
| Year | Team | Games | | | Passing | | | | | | | | Rushing | | | |
| Year | Team | GP | GS | Record | Cmp | Att | Pct | Yds | Y/A | TD | Int | Rtg | Att | Yds | Avg | TD |
|---|---|---|---|---|---|---|---|---|---|---|---|---|---|---|---|---|
| 2024 | Kentucky | 4 | 1 | 0–1 | 26 | 53 | 49.1 | 338 | 6.4 | 2 | 4 | 100.0 | 10 | -43 | -4.3 | 0 |
| 2025 | Kentucky | 11 | 10 | 4–6 | 198 | 301 | 65.8 | 2,160 | 7.2 | 15 | 12 | 134.5 | 66 | 85 | 1.3 | 2 |
| 2026 | Arizona State | 7 | 6 | 3–3 | 105 | 173 | 60.7 | 1,360 | 7.9 | 13 | 5 | 146.1 | 42 | 66 | 1.6 | 1 |
| Career | | 22 | 17 | 7–10 | 329 | 527 | 62.4 | 3,858 | 7.3 | 30 | 21 | 134.7 | 118 | 108 | 0.9 | 3 |
