= Isaiah Marshall =

American football player (born 2005)

No. 8 – Kansas Jayhawks
- Position: Quarterback
- Class: Redshirt Sophomore

Personal information
- Born: October 19, 2005 (age 21)
- Listed height: 6 ft 0 in (1.83 m)
- Listed weight: 210 lb (95 kg)

Career information
- High school: Southfield (Southfield, Michigan)
- College: Kansas (2024–present)
- Stats at ESPN

Isaiah Marshall (born October 19, 2005) is an American football quarterback for the Kansas Jayhawks.

== Early life ==
Marshall attended Southfield High School in Southfield, Michigan. He committed to play college football for the Kansas Jayhawks over offers from Kentucky, Maryland, and Michigan.

== College career ==
As a freshman in 2024, Marshall was redshirted. During the 2025 season, Marshall completed all three of his pass attempts for 28 yards and rushed for 160 yards on 15 carries. Heading into the 2026 season, he competed for the Jayhawks starting quarterback position against Cole Ballard. Marshall was named the Jayhawks starter prior to the season opener.
