= Cardae Mack =

American football player (born 2007)

No. 25 – Arizona State Sun Devils
- Position: Running back
- Class: Freshman

Personal information
- Born: October 11, 2007 (age 19)
- Listed height: 5 ft 10 in (1.78 m)
- Listed weight: 215 lb (98 kg)

Career information
- High school: Atascocita (Harris County, Texas)
- College: Arizona State (2026–present)
- Stats at ESPN

Cardae Mack (born October 11, 2007) is an American college football running back for the Arizona State Sun Devils.

== Early life ==
Mack attended Atascocita High School in Harris County, Texas, where he played both running back and quarterback. As a running back his sophomore year, he rushed for 1,370 yards and 18 touchdowns. Mack became the starting quarterback his junior year and was named the Texas District 23-6A Overall MVP after passing for 1,864 yards with 18 touchdowns and rushing for 1,918 yards with 22 touchdowns. As a senior, he passed for 2,000 yards with 32 touchdowns and rushed for 1,500 yards with 20 touchdowns. Mack committed to Arizona State University to play college football.

== College career ==
Mack earned early playing time his freshman year at Arizona State in 2026 before eventually becoming the starting running back.
