= Reed Harris (American football) =

American football player

No. 3 – Arizona State Sun Devils
- Position: Wide receiver
- Class: Redshirt Junior

Personal information
- Born: Minnesota, U.S.
- Listed height: 6 ft 5 in (1.96 m)
- Listed weight: 217 lb (98 kg)

Career information
- High school: Great Falls (Great Falls, Montana)
- College: Boston College (2023–2025); Arizona State (2026–present)
- Stats at ESPN

Reed Harris is an American football wide receiver for the Arizona State Sun Devils. He previously played for the Boston College Eagles.

== Early life ==
Harris was born in Minnesota, and moved to Conrad, Montana when he was a year old, growing up on a 12,000 acre farm. Harris moved to Great Falls, Montana when he was in 8th grade, later attending Great Falls High School where he was the football team's starting quarterback as a sophomore and junior. He moved to wide receiver during his senior season and finished with 553 yards and three touchdowns. Harris finished his high school career completing 229 passes for 21 touchdowns, while adding 1,575 yards and 13 touchdowns on the ground, with 36 receptions for 536 yards and four touchdowns through the air. He also added 83 tackles with ten being for a loss, nine sacks, five fumble recoveries, and a forced fumble on defense. Coming out of high school, Harris was rated as a three-star recruit in football, basketball, and track by 247Sports, and was ranked as the top player in the state of Montana in the class of 2023. He committed to play college football for the Boston College Eagles over offers from other schools such as Iowa State, Oregon State, Montana, Montana State, Colorado State, Utah State, San Diego State, Central Michigan, Harvard, Idaho, and Idaho State.

== College career ==
=== Boston College ===
As a freshman in 2023, Harris appeared in four games, making one catch, as he was redshirted. In week 2 of the 2024 season, he caught his first career touchdown in a win over Duquesne. During the 2024 season, Harris played in all 13 games with 11 starts, catching 17 passes for 486 yards and four touchdowns. During the 2025 season, he totaled 39 catches for 673 yards and five touchdowns; after the conclusion of the season, he entered the NCAA transfer portal.
