= 2025 Baylor Bears football team =

American college football season

2025 Baylor Bears football
- Conference: Big 12 Conference
- Record: 5–7 (3–6 Big 12)
- Head coach: Dave Aranda (6th season)
- Offensive coordinator: Jake Spavital (2nd season)
- Offensive scheme: Bear raid
- Defensive coordinator: Matt Powledge (3rd season)
- Base defense: 3–4
- Home stadium: McLane Stadium

Uniform
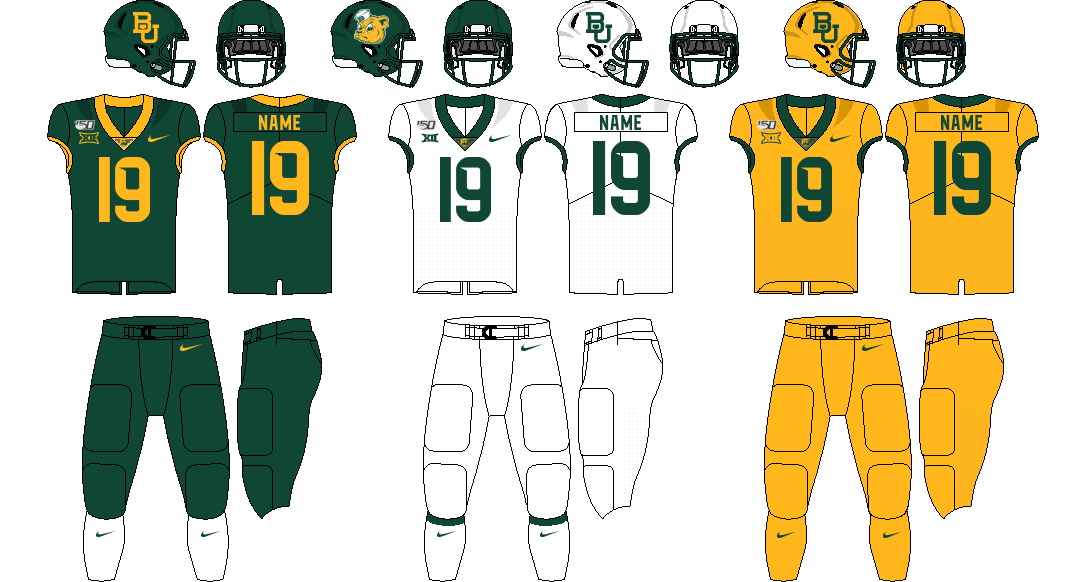

2025 Big 12 Conference football standings
	Conf.			Overall
Team	W		L	W		L
No. 7 Texas Tech y$^	8	–	1	12	–	2
No. 11 BYU y	8	–	1	12	–	2
No. 14 Utah	7	–	2	11	–	2
No. 22 Houston	6	–	3	10	–	3
Arizona	6	–	3	9	–	4
Arizona State	6	–	3	8	–	5
No. 25 TCU	5	–	4	9	–	4
Iowa State	5	–	4	8	–	4
Cincinnati	5	–	4	7	–	6
Kansas State	5	–	4	6	–	6
Baylor	3	–	6	5	–	7
Kansas	3	–	6	5	–	7
UCF	2	–	7	5	–	7
West Virginia	2	–	7	4	–	8
Colorado	1	–	8	3	–	9
Oklahoma State	0	–	9	1	–	11
Championship: Texas Tech 34, BYU 7
^ – College Football Playoff participant; $ – Conference champion; y – Championship game participant; Rankings from AP Poll

The 2025 Baylor Bears football team represented Baylor University as a member of the Big 12 Conference during the 2025 NCAA Division I FBS football season. Led by sixth-year head coach Dave Aranda, the Bears played home games at McLane Stadium located in Waco, Texas.

The Baylor Bears drew an average home attendance of 39,447.

== Offseason ==
=== Coaching staff changes ===
Name	Position	Reason	Replacement
Caleb Collins	Assistant Coach (Outside Linebackers)	Accepted Job with Detroit Lions	Carson Hall
Anthony Clavo Jr.	Associate Director of Player Personnel	Not Retained	Joe Reynolds

=== Coaching staff moves ===
Name	New Position	Previous Position
Mark Scott	Special Teams Coordinator	Quality Control Coach (Special Teams)
Rhett Holcomb	Assistant Coach (Quarterbacks)	Quality Control Coach

=== Coaching staff additions ===
Name	Position	Previous Position
Paul Gonzales	Defensive Pass-Game Coordinator (Cornerbacks)	Assistant Coach (Safeties) - TCU
Anthony Marciano	Assistant Coach (Linebackers)	Assistant Coach (Linebackers) - Michigan

== Schedule ==
Date	Time	Opponent	Site	TV	Result	Attendance
August 29	7:00 p.m.	Auburn*	McLane Stadium; Waco, TX	FOX	L 24–38	45,233
September 6	11:00 a.m.	at No. 17 SMU*	Gerald J. Ford Stadium; Dallas, TX	The CW	W 48–45 ^{2OT}	34,852
September 13	11:00 a.m.	Samford*	McLane Stadium; Waco, TX	ESPN+	W 42–7	41,215
September 20	6:30 p.m.	Arizona State	McLane Stadium; Waco, TX	FOX	L 24–27	40,964
September 27	2:30 p.m.	at Oklahoma State	Boone Pickens Stadium; Stillwater, OK	ESPN2	W 45–27	45,689
October 4	11:00 a.m.	Kansas State	McLane Stadium; Waco, TX	ESPN+	W 35–34	35,596
October 18	11:00 a.m.	at TCU	Amon G. Carter Stadium; Fort Worth, TX (The Revivalry)	ESPN2	L 36–42	43,868
October 25	3:00 p.m.	at No. 21 Cincinnati	Nippert Stadium; Cincinnati, OH	ESPN2	L 20–41	38,007
November 1	11:00 a.m.	UCF^{†}	McLane Stadium; Waco, TX	ESPNU	W 30–3	40,212
November 15	6:00 p.m.	No. 13 Utah	McLane Stadium; Waco, TX	ESPN2	L 28–55	38,186
November 22	12:00 p.m.	at Arizona	Casino Del Sol Stadium; Tucson, AZ	TNT	L 17–41	40,199
November 29	12:00 p.m.	Houston	McLane Stadium; Waco, TX (rivalry)	TNT	L 24–31	34,720
*Non-conference game; ^{†}Homecoming; Rankings from AP Poll (and CFP Rankings, after November 4) - Released prior to game; All times are in Central time

== Game summaries ==
=== vs Auburn ===
Auburn Tigers (0–0) at Baylor Bears (0–0) – Game summary

Quarter	1	2	3	4	Total
Tigers	7	10	14	7	38
Bears	3	7	7	7	24

at McLane Stadium • Waco, Texas

- Date: Friday, August 29th, 2025
- Game time: 7:00 p.m.
- Game weather: Clear • Temperature: 90 °F (32 °C) • Wind: NE 8 mph
- Game attendance: 45,233
- Referee: Jason Autrey
- TV announcers (FOX): Jason Benetti (play-by-play), Robert Griffin III (analyst), and Alexa Landestoy (sideline reporter)

Game information

First quarter

- BAY – Connor Hawkins 36-yard field goal, 10:36. Baylor 3–0. Drive: 13 plays, 56 yards, 4:24.
- AUB – Jackson Arnold 24–yard run (Alex McPherson kick), 0:34. Auburn 7–3. Drive: 12 plays, 96 yards, 5:53.

Second quarter

- AUB – Damari Alston 9–yard run (Alex McPherson kick), 10:29. Auburn 14–3. Drive: 7 plays, 65 yards, 3:45.
- AUB – Alex McPherson 21-yard field goal, 5:45. Auburn 17–3. Drive: 7 plays, 41 yards, 2:58.
- BAY – Kobe Prentice 33–yard pass from Sawyer Robertson (Connor Hawkins kick), 3:21. Auburn 17–10. Drive: 8 plays, 75 yards, 2:24.

Third quarter

- AUB – Jeremiah Cobb 2–yard run (Alex McPherson kick), 5:40. Auburn 24–10. Drive: 9 plays, 71 yards, 4:12.
- BAY – Caden Knighten 4–yard pass from Sawyer Robertson (Connor Hawkins kick), 0:58. Auburn 24–17. Drive: 10 plays, 75 yards, 4:42.
- AUB – Rayshawn Pleasant 98–yard kickoff return (Alex McPherson kick), 0:43. Auburn 31–17.

Fourth quarter

- BAY – Michael Trigg 4–yard pass from Sawyer Robertson (Connor Hawkins kick), 11:48. Auburn 31–24. Drive: 9 plays, 79 yards, 3:49.
- AUB – Jackson Arnold 27–yard run (Alex McPherson kick), 4:32. Auburn 38–24. Drive: 12 plays, 75 yards, 7:16.

Statistics	AUB	BAY
First downs	25	23
Plays–yards	69-415	72–483
Rushes–yards	52–307	24–64
Passing yards	108	419
Passing: comp–att–int	11–17–0	27–48–0
Turnovers	0	0
Time of possession	33:03	26:57

Team	Category	Player	Statistics
Auburn	Passing	Jackson Arnold	11/17, 108 yards
Auburn	Rushing	Jackson Arnold	16 carries, 137 yards, 2 TD
Auburn	Receiving	Eric Singleton Jr.	3 receptions, 20 yards
Baylor	Passing	Sawyer Robertson	27/48, 419 yards, 3 TD
Baylor	Rushing	Bryson Washington	14 carries, 54 yards
Baylor	Receiving	Kole Wilson	8 receptions, 134 yards

=== at No. 17 SMU ===
Baylor Bears (0–1) at No. 17 SMU Mustangs (1–0) – Game summary

Quarter	1	2	3	4	OT	2OT	Total
Bears	0	21	3	14	7	3	48
No. 17 Mustangs	10	14	0	14	7	0	45

at Gerald J. Ford Stadium • Dallas, Texas

- Date: September 6
- Game time: 11:00 a.m.
- Game weather: Cloudy • Temperature: 67 °F (19 °C) • Wind: N 2 mph
- Game attendance: 34,852
- Referee: Cravonne Barrett
- TV announcers (The CW): Rick Allen (play-by-play), Will Blackmon (analyst), and Wes Bryant (sideline reporter)

Game information

First quarter

- (14:48) SMU – Romello Brinson 75-yard pass from Kevin Jennings, Collin Rogers kick (Drive: 1 play, 75 yards, 0:12; SMU 7–0)
- (7:03) SMU – Collin Rogers 43-yard field goal (Drive: 8 plays, 31 yards, 2:52; SMU 10–0)

Second quarter

- (12:12) BAY – Kobe Prentice 28-yard pass from Sawyer Robertson, Connor Hawkins kick (Drive: 9 plays, 81 yards, 3:26; SMU 10–7)
- (7:21) SMU – T. J. Harden 3-yard run, Collin Rogers kick (Drive: 11 plays, 65 yards, 4:51; SMU 17–7)
- (5:07) BAY – Josh Cameron 33-yard pass from Sawyer Robertson, Connor Hawkins kick (Drive: 7 plays, 75 yards, 2:12; SMU 17–14)
- (4:49) SMU – Jalen Cooper 75-yard pass from Kevin Jennings, Collin Rogers kick (Drive: 1 play, 75 yards, 0:12; SMU 24–14)
- (0:37) BAY – Bryson Washington 7-yard run, Connor Hawkins kick (Drive: 11 plays, 79 yards, 4:07; SMU 24–21)

Third quarter

- (5:04) BAY – Connor Hawkins 26-yard field goal (Drive: 12 plays, 57 yards, 5:32; Tied 24–24)

Fourth quarter

- (14:24) SMU – T. J. Harden 40-yard run, Collin Rogers kick (Drive: 5 plays, 75 yards, 2:11; SMU 31–24)
- (8:38) SMU – T. J. Harden 5-yard run, Collin Rogers kick (Drive: 8 plays, 35 yards, 4:59; SMU 38–24)
- (5:23) BAY – Josh Cameron 48-yard pass from Sawyer Robertson, Connor Hawkins kick (Drive: 8 plays, 72 yards, 3:09; SMU 38–31)
- (0:34) BAY – Kobe Prentice 21-yard pass from Sawyer Robertson, Connor Hawkins kick (Drive: 10 plays, 82 yards, 1:49; Tied 38–38)

Overtime

- BAY – Bryson Washington 2-yard run, Connor Hawkins kick (Drive: 3 plays, 25 yards, 0:00; Baylor 45–38)
- SMU – Romello Brinson 25-yard pass from Kevin Jennings, Collin Rogers kick (Drive: 1 play, 25 yards, 0:00; Tied 45–45)

Double overtime

- BAY – Connor Hawkins 27-yard field goal (Drive: 7 plays, 16 yards, 0:00; Baylor 48–45)

Statistics	BAY	SMU
First downs	32	23
Plays–yards	94–601	66–458
Rushes–yards	44–161	44–163
Passing yards	440	295
Passing: comp–att–int	34–50–0	16–22–1
Turnovers	2	1
Time of possession	32:36	27:24

Team	Category	Player	Statistics
Baylor	Passing	Sawyer Robertson	34/50, 440 yards, 4 TD
Baylor	Rushing	Bryson Washington	31 carries, 115 yards, 2 TD
Baylor	Receiving	Josh Cameron	9 receptions, 151 yards, 2 TD
SMU	Passing	Kevin Jennings	16/22, 295 yards, 3 TD, INT
SMU	Rushing	T. J. Harden	19 carries, 115 yards, 3 TD
SMU	Receiving	Romello Brinson	4 receptions, 126 yards, 2 TD

=== vs Samford (FCS) ===
Samford Bulldogs (FCS) (0–2) at Baylor Bears (1–1) – Game summary

Quarter	1	2	3	4	Total
Bulldogs (FCS)	7	0	0	0	7
Bears	14	21	0	7	42

at McLane Stadium • Waco, Texas

- Date: September 13
- Game time: 11:00 a.m.
- Game weather: sunny • Temperature: 85 °F (29 °C) • Wind: S 9 mph
- Game attendance: 41,215
- Referee: Tutashinda Salaam
- TV announcers (ESPN+): James Westling (play-by-play), Leger Douzable (analyst) and Madison Hock (sideline)

Game information

First quarter

- (12:52) BAY – Bryson Washington 2 yard run, Connor Hawkins kick (Drive: 4 plays, 28 yards, 1:17; BAY 7–0)
- (09:37) BAY – Josh Cameron 10 yard pass from Sawyer Robertson, Connor Hawkins kick (Drive: 5 plays, 82 yards, 1:59; BAY 14–0)
- (01:07) SAM – Torrey Ward 12 yard pass from CJ Evans, Jake Garner kick (Drive: 10 plays, 80 yards, 4:00; BAY 14–7)

Second quarter

- (08:52) BAY – Kobe Prentice 12 yard pass from Sawyer Robertson, Connor Hawkins kick (Drive: 14 plays, 82 yards, 4:51; BAY 21–7)
- (04:22) BAY – Bryson Washington 5 yard run, Connor Hawkins kick (Drive: 8 plays, 34 yards, 3:23; BAY 28–7)
- (01:07) BAY – Caden Knighten 1 yard run, Connor Hawkins kick (Drive: 4 plays, 48 yards, 0:57; BAY 35–7)

Third quarter

- No scoring plays.

Fourth quarter

- (11:40) BAY – Louis Brown IV 11 yard pass from Sawyer Robertson, Connor Hawkins kick (Drive: 14 plays, 88 yards, 4:12; BAY 42–7)

Statistics	SAM	BAY
First downs	10	29
Plays–yards	58–195	87–468
Rushes–yards	33–95	43–223
Passing yards	100	245
Passing: comp–att–int	13–25–3	28–44–2
Turnovers	4	2
Time of possession	25:54	34:06

Team	Category	Player	Statistics
Samford	Passing	Quincy Crittendon	7/13, 59 yards, INT
Samford	Rushing	CJ Evans	13 carries, 53 yards
Samford	Receiving	Torrey Ward	5 receptions, 62 yards, TD
Baylor	Passing	Sawyer Robertson	23/37, 211 yards, 3 TD, 2 INT
Baylor	Rushing	Bryson Washington	21 carries, 135 yards, 2 TD
Baylor	Receiving	Ashtyn Hawkins	3 receptions, 42 yards

=== vs Arizona State ===
Arizona State Sun Devils (2–1) at Baylor Bears (2–1) – Game summary

Quarter	1	2	3	4	Total
Sun Devils	3	7	3	14	27
Bears	3	7	0	14	24

at McLane Stadium • Waco, Texas

- Date: September 20
- Game time: 6:30 p.m.
- Game weather: Sunny • Temperature: 89 °F (32 °C) • Wind: SE 8 mph
- Game attendance: 40,964
- Referee: Kevin Boitmann
- TV announcers (FOX): Tim Brando (play-by-play), Devin Gardner (analyst) and Josh Sims (sideline)

Game information

First quarter

- (8:21) ASU – Jesus Gomez 31-yard field goal (Drive: 14 plays, 45 yards, 5:44; ASU 3–0)
- (4:08) BAY – Connor Hawkins 53-yard field goal (Drive: 11 plays, 51 yards, 4:13; Tied 3–3)

Second quarter

- (6:26) ASU – Sam Leavitt 1-yard run, Jesus Gomez kick (Drive: 13 plays, 83 yards, 6:15; ASU 10–3)
- (3:08) BAY – Kole Wilson 8-yard pass from Sawyer Robertson, Connor Hawkins kick (Drive: 7 plays, 73 yards, 3:12; Tied 10–10)

Third quarter

- (8:06) ASU – Jesus Gomez 21-yard field goal (Drive: 8 plays, 27 yards, 3:36; ASU 13–10)

Fourth quarter

- (13:35) ASU – Jesus Gomez 33-yard field goal (Drive: 5 plays, 21 yards, 1:47; ASU 16–10)
- (9:02) BAY – Michael Trigg 1-yard pass from Sawyer Robertson, Connor Hawkins kick (Drive: 10 plays, 75 yards, 4:33; BAY 17–16)
- (5:29) ASU – Jordon Tyson 19-yard pass from Sam Leavitt, Jordon Tyson pass from Sam Leavitt for 2-pt (Drive: 7 plays, 84 yards, 3:22; ASU 17–24)
- (1:52) BAY – Michael Trigg 33-yard pass from Sawyer Robertson, Connor Hawkins kick (Drive: 8 plays, 64 yards, 3:29; Tied 24–24)
- (00:00) ASU – Jesus Gomez 43-yard field goal (Drive: 11 plays, 49 yards, 1:52; ASU 27–24)

Statistics	ASU	BAY
First downs	26	28
Plays–yards	80-400	62-357
Rushes–yards	48-179	23-107
Passing yards	221	250
Passing: comp–att–int	22-32-0	25-39-1
Turnovers	0	3
Time of possession	36:35	23:25

Team	Category	Player	Statistics
Arizona State	Passing	Sam Leavitt	22/32, 221 yards, TD
Arizona State	Rushing	Raleek Brown	21 carries, 80 yards
Arizona State	Receiving	Derek Eusebio	2 receptions, 78 yards
Baylor	Passing	Sawyer Robertson	25/39, 250 yards, 3 TD, INT
Baylor	Rushing	Bryson Washington	17 carries, 111 yards
Baylor	Receiving	Michael Trigg	5 receptions, 71 yards, 2 TD

=== at Oklahoma State ===
Baylor Bears (2–2) at Oklahoma State Cowboys (1–2) – Game summary

Quarter	1	2	3	4	Total
Bears	7	21	7	10	45
Cowboys	7	13	7	0	27

at Boone Pickens Stadium • Stillwater, Oklahoma

- Date: September 27
- Game time: 2:30 p.m.
- Game weather: Sunny • Temperature: 90 °F (32 °C) • Wind: SW at 8 mph (13 km/h)
- Game attendance: 45,689
- Referee: Henry Johns
- TV announcers (ESPN2): Lowell Galindo (play-by-play), Aaron Murray (analyst) and Lauren Sisler (sideline)

Game information

First quarter

- (12:27) BAY – Kole Wilson 34-yard pass from Swayer Robertson, Connor Hawkins kick (Drive: 3 plays, 78 yards, 1:11; BAY 7–0)
- (6:54) OSU – Josh Ford 26-yard pass from Sam Jackson V, Logan Ward kick (Drive: 12 plays, 75 yards, 5:33; Tied 7–7)

Second quarter

- (14:53) BAY – Bryson Washington 19-yard run, Connor Hawkins kick (Drive: 7 plays, 64 yards, 1:52; BAY 14–7)
- (11:31) OSU – Logan Ward 39-yard field goal (Drive: 10 plays, 75 yards, 3:22; BAY 14–10)
- (9:08) BAY – Matthew Klopfenstein 6-yard pass from Sawyer Robertson, Connor Hawkins kick (Drive: 6 plays, 78 yards, 2:17; BAY 21–10)
- (8:12) OSU – Trent Howland 10-yard run, Logan Ward kick (Drive: 3 plays, 75 yards, 0:56; BAY 21–17)
- (3:40) BAY – Michael Trigg 10-yard pass from Sawyer Robertson, Connor Hawkins kick (Drive: 7 plays, 56 yards, 2:21; BAY 28–17)
- (1:02) OSU – Logan Ward 42-yard field goal (Drive: 12 plays, 58 yards, 2:32; BAY 28–20)

Third quarter

- (14:10) BAY – Kobe Prentice 73-yard pass from Sawyer Robertson, Connor Hawkins kick (Drive: 3 plays, 86 yards, 0:45; BAY 35–20)
- (5:22) OSU – Trent Howland 1-yard run, Logan Ward kick (Drive: 5 plays, 55 yards, 2:01; BAY 35–27)

Fourth quarter

- (14:49) BAY – Connor Hawkins 36-yard field goal (Drive: 12 plays, 56 yards, 5:33; BAY 38–27)
- (6:31) BAY – Sawyer Robertson 2-yard run, Connor Hawkins kick (Drive: 14 plays, 89 yards, 5:29; BAY 45–27)

Statistics	BAY	OKST
First downs	29	22
Plays–yards	74–612	78–448
Rushes–yards	39–219	32–157
Passing yards	393	291
Passing: comp–att–int	24–35	27–46
Turnovers	1	0
Time of possession	31:52	28:08

Team	Category	Player	Statistics
Baylor	Passing	Sawyer Robertson	24/35, 393 yards, 4 TD
Baylor	Rushing	Caden Knighten	5 carries, 81 yards
Baylor	Receiving	Josh Cameron	6 receptions, 98 yards
Oklahoma State	Passing	Zane Flores	23/41, 232 yards
Oklahoma State	Rushing	Trent Howland	16 carries, 84 yards, 2 TD
Oklahoma State	Receiving	Shamar Rigby	5 receptions, 84 yards

=== vs Kansas State ===
Kansas State Wildcats (2–3) at Baylor Bears (3–2) – Game summary

Quarter	1	2	3	4	Total
Wildcats	7	10	14	3	34
Bears	3	14	0	18	35

at McLane Stadium • Waco, Texas

- Date: October 4
- Game time: 11:00 a.m.
- Game weather: Clear • Temperature: 80 °F (27 °C) • Wind: SE 5 mph
- Game attendance: 35,596
- Referee: Kevin Mar
- TV announcers (ESPN+): Pete Sousa (play-by-play), Leger Douzable (analyst) and Tori Petry (sideline)

Game information

First quarter

- (9:33) KSU – Avery Johnson 31-yard run, Luis Rodriguez kick (Drive: 10 plays, 75 yards, 5:27; KSU 7–0)
- (4:18) BAY – Connor Hawkins 30-yard field goal (Drive: 13 plays, 76 yards, 5:11; KSU 7–3)

Second quarter

- (7:38) BAY – Kobe Prentice 30-yard pass from Sawyer Robertson, Connor Hawkins kick (Drive: 4 plays, 70 yards, 1:31; BAY 10–7)
- (4:23) KSU – Luis Rodriguez 49-yard field goal (Drive: 9 plays, 57 yards, 3:11; Tied 10–10)
- (1:57) BAY – Michael Turner 17-yard run, Connor Hawkins kick (Drive: 8 plays, 75 yards, 2:26; BAY 17–10)
- (00:13) KSU – Garrett Oakley 9-yard pass from Avery Johnson, Luis Rodriguez kick (Drive: 9 plays, 72 yards, 1:38; Tied 17–17)

Third quarter

- (4:35) KSU – Jayce Brown 12-yard pass from Avery Johnson, Luis Rodriguez kick (Drive: 14 plays, 97 yards, 6:41; KSU 24–17)
- (1:15) KSU – Dylan Edwards 5-yard run, Luis Rodriguez kick (Drive: 4 plays, 44 yards, 2:02; KSU 31–17)

Fourth quarter

- (8:50) BAY – Bryson Washington 11-yard pass from Sawyer Robertson, Sawyer Robertson run for 2-pt (Drive: 3 plays, 82 yards, 1:07; KSU 31–25)
- (4:28) BAY – Jacob Redding 66-yard interception return, Connor Hawkins kick (BAY 32-31)
- (1:48) KSU – Luis Rodriguez 22-yard field goal (Drive: 7 plays, 72 yards, 2:35; KSU 34–32)
- (00:31) BAY – Connor Hawkins 53-yard field goal (Drive: 6 plays, 28 yards, 1:10; BAY 35–34)

Statistics	KSU	BAY
First downs	30	25
Plays–yards	82-501	64-443
Rushes–yards	36-162	25-98
Passing yards	339	345
Passing: comp–att–int	29-46-1	25-39-1
Turnovers	1	2
Time of possession	37:47	22:13

Team	Category	Player	Statistics
Kansas State	Passing	Avery Johnson	29/45, 339 yards, 2 TD, INT
Kansas State	Rushing	Avery Johnson	10 carries, 72 yards, TD
Kansas State	Receiving	Jayce Brown	4 receptions, 106 yards, TD
Baylor	Passing	Sawyer Robertson	25/39, 345 yards, 2 TD, INT
Baylor	Rushing	Bryson Washington	9 carries, 65 yards
Baylor	Receiving	Michael Trigg	8 receptions, 155 yards

=== at TCU (rivalry) ===
Baylor Bears (4–2) at TCU Horned Frogs (4–2) – Game summary

Quarter	1	2	3	4	Total
Bears	7	3	8	18	36
Horned Frogs	0	21	7	14	42

at Amon G. Carter Stadium • Fort Worth, Texas

- Date: October 18
- Game time: 11:00 a.m.
- Game weather: Cloudy • Temperature: 77 °F (25 °C) • Wind: SW at 12 mph (19 km/h)
- Game attendance: 43,868
- Referee: David Alvarez
- TV announcers (ESPN2): Lowell Galindo (play-by-play), Aaron Murray (analyst) and Lauren Sisler (sideline)

Game information

First quarter

- (0:53) BAY – Bryson Washington 1-yard run, Connor Hawkins kick (Drive: 13 plays, 92 yards, 6:22; Baylor 7–0)

Second quarter

- (10:59) TCU – DJ Rogers 8-yard pass from Josh Hoover, Nate McCashland kick (Drive: 12 plays, 75 yards, 4:54; Tied 7–7)
- (6:10) TCU – Kevorian Barnes 5-yard run, Nate McCashland kick (Drive: 2 plays, 17 yards, 0:29; TCU 14–7)
- (2:04) BAY – Connor Hawkins 42-yard field goal (Drive: 11 plays, 47 yards, 3:58; TCU 14–10)
- (0:11) TCU – Jordan Dwyer 6-yard pass from Josh Hoover, Nate McCashland kick (Drive: 10 plays, 77 yards, 1:47; TCU 21–10)

Third quarter

- (11:39) TCU – Ka'Morreun Pimpton 3-yard pass from Josh Hoover, Nate McCashland kick (Drive: 7 plays, 74 yards, 3:13; TCU 28–10)
- (6:40) BAY – Jadon Porter 18-yard pass from Sawyer Robertson, Sawyer Robertson–Josh Cameron pass (Drive: 13 plays, 75 yards, 4:59; TCU 28–18)

Fourth quarter

- (14:55) BAY – Connor Hawkins 41-yard field goal (Drive: 12 plays, 58 yards, 5:14; TCU 28–21)
- (13:46) TCU – Trent Battle 65-yard run, Nate McCashland kick (Drive: 3 plays, 75 yards, 1:09; TCU 35–21)
- (6:04) TCU – Kevorian Barnes 14-yard run, Nate McCashland kick (Drive: 4 plays, 33 yards, 2:12; TCU 42–21)
- (3:08) BAY – Keaton Thomas 42-yard fumble return, Sawyer Robertson run (TCU 42–29)
- (0:30) BAY – Kole Wilson 35-yard pass from Sawyer Robertson, Connor Hawkins kick (Drive: 10 plays, 95 yards, 1:19; TCU 42–36)

Statistics	BAY	TCU
First downs	27	21
Plays–yards	89–439	69–427
Rushes–yards	37–121	38–196
Passing yards	318	231
Passing: comp–att–int	25–52–3	22–31–0
Turnovers	4	1
Time of possession	31:48	28:12

Team	Category	Player	Statistics
Baylor	Passing	Sawyer Robertson	25/52, 318 yards, 2 TD, 3 INT
Baylor	Rushing	Michael Turner	12 carries, 68 yards
Baylor	Receiving	Ashtyn Hawkins	7 receptions, 95 yards
TCU	Passing	Josh Hoover	22/31, 231 yards, 3 TD
TCU	Rushing	Kevorian Barnes	25 carries, 106 yards, 2 TD
TCU	Receiving	Jordan Dwyer	7 receptions, 111 yards, TD

=== at No. 21 Cincinnati ===
Baylor Bears (4–3) at No. 21 Cincinnati Bearcats (6–1) – Game summary

Quarter	1	2	3	4	Total
Bears	0	6	6	8	20
No. 21 Bearcats	14	10	3	14	41

at Nippert Stadium • Cincinnati, Ohio

- Date: October 25
- Game time: 4:00 p.m. EDT
- Game weather: Cloudy • Temperature: 55 °F (13 °C) • Wind: NE at 6 miles per hour (9.7 km/h)
- Game attendance: 38,007
- Referee: Tutashinda Salaam
- TV announcers (ESPN2): Mike Monaco (play-by-play), Kirk Morrison (analyst), and Dawn Davenport (sideline)

Game information

First quarter

- (9:52) CIN – Tawee Walker 1-yard run, Stephen Rusnak kick (Drive: 11 plays, 81 yards, 5:03; Cincinnati 7–0)
- (1:22) CIN – Evan Pryor 5-yard run, Stephen Rusnak kick (Drive: 10 plays, 66 yards, 4:50; Cincinnati 14–0)

Second quarter

- (5:42) CIN – Stephen Rusnak 46-yard field goal (Drive: 9 plays, 27 yards, 3:19; Cincinnati 17–0)
- (2:34) CIN – Cyrus Allen 6-yard pass from Brendan Sorsby, Stephen Rusnak kick (Drive: 6 plays, 29 yards, 3:01; Cincinnati 24–0)
- (0:16) BAY – Michael Trigg 6-yard pass from Sawyer Robertson (Drive: 11 plays, 75 yards, 2:18; Cincinnati 24–6)

Third quarter

- (10:36) BAY – Josh Cameron 9-yard pass from Sawyer Robertson (Drive: 10 plays, 80 yards, 4:19; Cincinnati 24–12)
- (5:15) CIN – Stephen Rusnak 36-yard field goal (Drive: 12 plays, 57 yards, 5:21; Cincinnati 27–12)

Fourth quarter

- (13:34) BAY – Sawyer Robertson 1-yard run, Michael Turner rush (Drive: 13 plays, 75 yards, 6:41; Cincinnati 27–20)
- (6:13) CIN – Brendan Sorsby 23-yard run, Stephen Rusnak kick (Drive: 12 plays, 75 yards, 7:21; Cincinnati 34–20)
- (4:26) CIN – Isaiah Johnson 8-yard pass from Brendan Sorsby, Stephen Rusnak kick (Drive: 3 plays, 17 yards, 1:38; Cincinnati 41–20)

Statistics	BAY	CIN
First downs	17	26
Plays–yards	58–266	71–376
Rushes–yards	32–129	50–265
Passing yards	137	111
Passing: comp–att–int	18–26–0	13–21–0
Turnovers	2	0
Time of possession	24:54	35:06

Team	Category	Player	Statistics
Baylor	Passing	Sawyer Robertson	18/26, 137 yards, 2 TD
Baylor	Rushing	Michael Turner	14 carries, 90 yards
Baylor	Receiving	Josh Cameron	4 receptions, 34 yards, TD
Cincinnati	Passing	Brendan Sorsby	13/21, 111 yards, 2 TD
Cincinnati	Rushing	Brendan Sorsby	11 carries, 85 yards, TD
Cincinnati	Receiving	Cyrus Allen	3 receptions, 36 yards, TD

=== vs UCF ===
UCF Knights (4–3) at Baylor Bears (4–4) – Game summary

Quarter	1	2	3	4	Total
Knights	0	3	0	0	3
Bears	14	6	3	7	30

at McLane Stadium • Waco, Texas

- Date: November 1
- Game time: 11:00 a.m.
- Game weather: Cloudy, 59 degrees
- Game attendance: 40,212
- Referee: Kevin Boitmann
- TV announcers (ESPNU): Brian Custer (play-by-play) and Craig Haubert (analyst)

Game information

First quarter

- BAY – Michael Trigg 13-yard pass from Sawyer Robertson (Connor Hawkins Kick), 10:49, Bears 7–0. Drive: 11 plays, 75 yards, 4:11.
- BAY – Josh Cameron 2-yard pass from Sawyer Robertson (Connor Hawkins Kick), 6:41, Bears 14–0. Drive: 8 plays, 48 yards, 3:03.

Second quarter

- BAY – Connor Hawkins 40-yard field goal, 14:14, Bears 17–0. Drive: 8 plays, 64 yards, 3:13.
- BAY – Connor Hawkins 28-yard field goal, 2:28, Bears 20–0. Drive: 6 plays, 48 yards, 1:47.
- UCF – Noe Ruelas 45-yard field goal, 0:01, Bears 20–3. Drive: 3 plays, 0 yards, 0:13.

Third quarter

- BAY – Connor Hawkins 41-yard field goal, 4:28, Bears 23–3. Drive: 13 plays, 42 yards, 6:30.

Fourth quarter

- BAY – Kole Wilson 9-yard pass from Sawyer Robertson (Connor Hawkins Kick), 6:04, Bears 30–3. Drive: 3 plays, 7 yards, 1:37.

Statistics	UCF	BAY
First downs	13	24
Plays–yards	56–225	79–417
Rushes–yards	23–74	39–150
Passing yards	151	267
Passing: comp–att–int	18–33–2	29–40–0
Turnovers	2	1
Time of possession	26:02	33:58

Team	Category	Player	Statistics
UCF	Passing	Tayven Jackson	18/33, 151 yards, 2 INT
UCF	Rushing	Myles Montgomery	12 carries, 50 yards
UCF	Receiving	Duane Thomas Jr.	8 receptions, 77 yards
Baylor	Passing	Sawyer Robertson	29/40, 267 yards, 3 TD
Baylor	Rushing	Caden Knighten	21 carries, 104 yards
Baylor	Receiving	Michael Trigg	5 receptions, 82 yards, TD

=== vs No. 13 Utah ===
No. 13 Utah Utes (7–2) at Baylor Bears (5–4) – Game summary

Quarter	1	2	3	4	Total
No. 13 Utes	14	14	7	20	55
Bears	0	17	3	8	28

at McLane Stadium • Waco, Texas

- Date: November 15
- Game time: 6:00 p.m.
- Game weather:
- Game attendance: 38,186
- Referee: Kevin Mar
- TV announcers (ESPN2): Lowell Galindo (play-by-play), Aaron Murray (analyst), and Lauren Sisler (sideline)

Game information

First quarter

- UTAH – Dallen Bentley 25-yard pass from Devon Dampier (Dillon Curtis kick), 2:31. Utes 7–0. Drive: 10 plays, 76 yards, 4:50.
- UTAH – Elijah Davis 65-yard interception return (Dillon Curtis kick), 0:11. Utes 14–0.

Second quarter

- BAY – Josh Cameron 1-yard pass from Sawyer Robertson (Connor Hawkins kick), 12:00. Utes 14–7. Drive: 8 plays, 75 yards, 3:11.
- UTAH – Byrd Ficklin 67-yard run (Dillon Curtis kick), 10:47. Utes 21–7. Drive: 3 plays, 75 yards, 1:13.
- BAY – Connor Hawkins 23-yard field goal, 5:01. Utes 21–10. Drive: 8 plays, 73 yards, 3:16.
- UTAH – Wayshawn Parker 64-yard run (Dillon Curtis kick), 4:28. Utes 28–10. Drive: 2 plays, 75 yards, 0:33.
- BAY – Josh Cameron 29-yard pass from Sawyer Robertson (Connor Hawkins kick), 0:04. Utes 28–17. Drive: 2 plays, 55 yards, 0:18.

Third quarter

- BAY – Connor Hawkins 31-yard field goal, 8:09. Utes 28–20. Drive: 10 plays, 63 yards, 3:37.
- UTAH – Byrd Ficklin 74-yard run (Dillon Curtis kick), 7:14. Utes 35–20. Drive: 2 plays, 85 yards, 0:49.

Fourth quarter

- UTAH – NaQuari Rogers 3-yard run (Dillon Curtis kick), 14:12. Utes 42–20. Drive: 8 plays, 54 yards, 4:20.
- UTAH – Wayshawn Parker 5-yard pass from Devon Dampier (Dillon Curtis kick), 11:03. Utes 49–20. Drive: 3 plays, 9 yards, 1:40.
- BAY – Kole Wilson 18-yard pass from Sawyer Robertson (Sawyer Robertson–Josh Cameron pass), 8:18. Utes 49–28. Drive: 6 plays, 75 yards, 2:45.
- UTAH – NaQuari Rogers 1-yard run (Dillon Curtis kick BLOCKED), 3:28. Utes 55–28. Drive: 10 plays, 90 yards, 4:50.

Statistics	UTAH	BAY
First downs	20	28
Plays–yards	59–483	92–563
Rushes–yards	41–380	33–133
Passing yards	103	430
Passing: comp–att–int	8–16–0	29–58–2
Turnovers	0	2
Time of possession	28:03	32:57

Team	Category	Player	Statistics
Utah	Passing	Devon Dampier	6/13, 80 yards, 2 TD
Utah	Rushing	Byrd Ficklin	6 carries, 166 yards, 2 TD
Utah	Receiving	Dallen Bentley	3 receptions, 48 yards, TD
Baylor	Passing	Sawyer Robertson	29/59, 430 yards, 3 TD, 2 INT
Baylor	Rushing	Bryson Washington	14 carries, 97 yards
Baylor	Receiving	Josh Cameron	13 receptions, 165 yards, 2 TD

=== at Arizona ===
Baylor Bears (5–5) at Arizona Wildcats (7–3) – Game summary

Quarter	1	2	3	4	Total
Bears	14	3	0	0	17
Wildcats	7	7	7	20	41

at Casino Del Sol Stadium • Tucson, AZ

- Date: November 22
- Game time: 12:00 p.m.
- Game weather: Cloudy, 69 °F (21 °C)
- Game attendance: 40,199
- Referee: Carvonne Barrett
- TV announcers (TNT): J.B. Long (play-by-play), Mike Golic Jr. (analyst) and Bridget Howard (sideline)

Game information

First quarter

- (12:05) BAY – Josh Cameron 9-yard pass from Sawyer Robertson, Connor Hawkins kick (Drive: 7 plays, 75 yards, 2:55; Baylor 7–0)
- (7:46) ARIZ – Kedrick Reescano 2-yard run, Michael Salgado-Medina kick (Drive: 10 plays, 75 yards, 4:19; Tied 7–7)
- (0:40) BAY – Sawyer Robertson 2-yard run, Drive kick (Drive: 17 plays, 75 yards, 7:06; Baylor 14–7)

Second quarter

- (8:59) ARIZ – Kris Hutson 2-yard pass from Noah Fifita, Michael Salgado-Medina kick (Drive: 13 plays, 82 yards, 6:35; Tied 14–14)
- (0:00) BAY – Connor Hawkins 48-yard field goal (Drive: 9 plays, 30 yards, 1:51; Baylor 17–14)

Third quarter

- (11:49) ARIZ – Kedrick Reescano 1-yard run, Michael Salgado-Medina kick (Drive: 8 plays, 75 yards, 3:11; Arizona 21–17)

Fourth quarter

- (10:31) ARIZ – Ismail Mahdi 28-yard run, Michael Salgado-Medina kick (Drive: 1 play, 28 yards, 0:06; Arizona 28–17)
- (6:38) ARIZ – Kedrick Reescano 19-yard run, Michael Salgado-Medina kick (Drive: 4 plays, 32 yards, 2:27; Arizona 35–17)
- (6:27) ARIZ – Jabari Mann 34-yard interception return, kick failed (Arizona 41–17)

Statistics	BAY	ARIZ
First downs	20	22
Plays–yards	78–343	60–355
Rushes–yards	45–181	35–172
Passing yards	162	183
Passing: Comp–Att–Int	22–33–2	14–25–1
Turnovers	3	1
Time of possession	32:48	27:12

Team	Category	Player	Statistics
Baylor	Passing	Sawyer Robertson	22/33, 162 yards, TD, 2 INT
Baylor	Rushing	Caden Knighten	17 carries, 100 yards
Baylor	Receiving	Josh Cameron	6 receptions, 71 yards, TD
Arizona	Passing	Noah Fifita	14/25, 183 yards, TD, INT
Arizona	Rushing	Ismail Mahdi	14 carries, 93 yards, TD
Arizona	Receiving	Kris Hutson	9 receptions, 133 yards, TD

=== vs Houston (rivalry) ===
No. 23 Houston Cougars (8-3) at Baylor Bears (5-6) – Game summary

Quarter	1	2	3	4	Total
Cougars	7	10	7	7	31
Bears	0	9	0	15	24

at McLane Stadium • Waco, TX

- Date: November 29
- Game time: 11:00 a.m. CST
- Game weather: Cloudy; 66 °F (19 °C)
- Game attendance: 34,720
- Referee: Tuta Salaam
- TV announcers (TNT): J.B. Long (play-by-play), Mike Golic Jr. (analyst) and Coy Wire (sideline)

Game information

First quarter

- (7:47) HOU - Amare Thomas 27-yard pass from Conner Weigman, Ethan Sanchez kick (Drive: 12 plays, 82 yards, 5:18; Cougars 7-0)

Second quarter

- (14:13) HOU - Conner Weigman 28-yard run, Ethan Sanchez kick (Drive: 6 plays, 69 yards, 2:15; Cougars 14-0)
- (13:44) BAY - Connor Hawkins 54-yard field goal (Drive: 4 plays, 0 yards, 0:19; Cougars 14-3)
- (6:22) BAY - Connor Hawkins 34-yard field goal (Drive: 12 plays, 46 yards, 5:35; Cougars 14-6)
- (1:40) HOU - Ethan Sanchez 29-yard field goal (Drive: 12 plays, 64 yards, 4:42; Cougars 17-6)
- (0:15) BAY - Connor Hawkins 30-yard field goal (Drive: 12 plays, 62 yards, 1:25; Cougars 17-9)

Third quarter

- (4:58) HOU - Conner Weigman 1-yard run, Ethan Sanchez kick (Drive: 5 plays, 65 yards, 2:36; Cougars 24-9)

Fourth quarter

- (12:19) BAY - Joseph Dodds 1-yard run, Sawyer Robertson run for two-point conversion (Drive: 7 plays, 50 yards, 2:57; Cougars 24-17)
- (8:53) BAY - Josh Cameron 31-yard pass from Sawyer Robertson, Connor Hawkins kick (Drive: 5 plays, 44 yards, 1:20; Tied 24-24)
- (1:57) HOU - Dean Connors 1-yard run, Ethan Sanchez kick (Drive: 15 plays, 74 yards, 6:52; Cougars 31-24)

Statistics	HOU	BAY
First downs	29	25
Plays–yards	79–417	72–421
Rushes–yards	48–216	26–112
Passing yards	201	309
Passing: comp–att–int	21–31–1	23–46–1
Turnovers	1	2
Time of possession	36:26	23:34

Team	Category	Player	Statistics
Houston	Passing	Conner Weigman	21/31, 201 yards, TD, INT
Houston	Rushing	Conner Weigman	22 carries, 121 yards
Houston	Receiving	Amare Thomas	9 receptions, 97 yards, TD
Baylor	Passing	Sawyer Robertson	23/46, 309 yards, TD, INT
Baylor	Rushing	Joseph Dodds	12 carries, 61 yards, TD
Baylor	Receiving	Kobe Prentice	4 receptions, 96 yards

== Personnel ==
=== Coaching staff ===
Name	Position	Seasons at Baylor
Dave Aranda	Head coach	6th
Khenon Hall	Associate head coach and running backs coach	2nd
Jake Spavital	Offensive coordinator and quarterbacks coach	2nd
Paul Gonzales	Defensive pass-game coordinator and cornerbacks coach	1st
Matt Powledge	Defensive coordinator and safeties coach	4th
Mark Scott	Special teams coordinator	2nd
Jarrett Anderson	Tight ends coach	2nd
Dallas Baker	Wide receivers coach	4th
Inoke Breckterfield	Defensive line coach	2nd
Jamar Chaney	Inside linebackers coach	2nd
Mason Miller	Offensive line coach	2nd
Carson Hall	Outside linebackers coach	1st
Rhett Holcomb	Quarterbacks coach	1st
Anthony Marciano	Cornerbacks coach	1st
Jeff Grigus	Chief of staff	3rd

=== Roster ===
2025 Baylor Bears football team roster
Players
Coaches
Offense

Pos.	#	Name	Class
TE	1	Michael Trigg	Sr
WR	6	Ashtyn Hawkins	GS
RB	7	Bryson Washington	So
QB	11	Walker White	Fr
TE	12	Kelsey Johnson	Jr
QB	13	Sawyer Robertson	Sr
QB	14	Nate Bennett	Fr
QB	15	Edward Griffin	Fr
WR	16	Kobe Prentice	Sr
QB	17	Cade Tessier	So
WR	18	Tyler Kirkwood	GS
WR	19	Kole Wilson	Sr
WR	20	Jacorey Watson	Fr
WR	21	Michael Johnson Jr.	So
RB	22	Caden Knighten	Fr
RB	23	Michael Turner	Fr
WR	24	Louis Brown IV	Sr
RB	27	Joseph Dodds	Fr
WR	31	Mason Dossett	Fr
WR	32	Brody Day	Fr
WR	34	Josh Cameron	Sr
RB	35	Dawson Pendergrass	Jr
WR	36	Ryne Shackelford	So
RB	37	Joseph Hagman	So
RB	39	Wilson Eseme III	Fr
TE	43	Brody Wilhelm	Fr
OL	57	Wes Tucker	So
OL	61	Cayden Tone	So
OL	62	Ryan Lengyel	Sr
OL	63	Wyatt Swaner	Fr
OL	64	Ka'Marii Landers	Jr
OL	65	Sean Thomkins	So
OL	66	Koltin Sieraki	Fr
OL	68	Omar Aigbedion	Sr
OL	69	Sidney Fugar	Sr
OL	71	Matthew Parker	Fr
OL	72	Coleton Price	Jr
OL	74	Kaden Sieracki	Jr
OL	75	Harrison Cluff	Fr
OL	76	Keystone Allison	So
OL	76	Isaiah Robinson	So
OL	77	Colton Thomasson	So
OL	78	Joe Crocker	So
OL	79	Connor Cameron	Fr
WR	80	Jackson Baird	Fr
WR	81	Seth Weller	Jr
TE	82	Cody Mladenka	Jr
WR	83	Jadon Porter	So
WR	84	Chase Collier	Fr
TE	85	Matthew Klopfenstein	Jr
TE	86	Hawkins Polley	So
WR	87	Ashton Jones	Fr
WR	88	Taz Williams Jr.	Fr
WR	89	Daniel Edeni	Fr

Defense

Pos.	#	Name	Class
DL	0	Jackie Marshall	Sr
S	3	Devyn Bobby	Sr
CB	8	Caden Jenkins	Jr
LB	11	Keaton Thomas	Jr
CB	12	Kyler Beaty	Fr
S	13	Devin Turner	Sr
CB	14	KJ Makins	GS
S	15	Carl Williams IV	Jr
S	16	Kendrick Simpkins	GS
S	17	Tyler Turner	So
CB	18	Caldra Williford	Jr
CB	19	Leo Almanza Jr.	Fr
S	20	Placide Djungu-Sungu	Sr
S	21	Bo Onu	Fr
CB	22	Reggie Bush II	Jr
S	23	Cameren Jenkins	So
S	24	Micah Gifford	Jr
CB	25	Levar Thornton Jr.	So
S	26	Colin Peacock	Fr
CB	27	Tevin Williams	Sr
CB	28	Calvin Simpson-Hunt	So
S	29	Kris Wokomah	Fr
S	30	Michael Allen	Jr
LB	31	Phoenix Jackson	Sr
OLB	32	Emar'rion Winston	Jr
S	33	DJ Coleman	Jr
CB	34	MJ Artmore Jr	So
LB	36	Travion Barnes	Sr
S	37	Demetrius Brisbon	Fr
S	38	Jacob Redding	So
OLB	40	Kyler Jordan	Jr
LB	41	Kaleb Burns	Fr
LB	42	Jeremy Evans	Jr
LB	44	Ke'Breion Winston	Fr
LB	45	Kyland Reed	So
LB	47	Trent Spence	Fr
S	48	Jad Darkazalli	Fr
LB	49	Trey Laurance	So
OLB	50	Matthew Fobbs-White	Jr
OLB	51	Kamauryn Morgan	Fr
OLB	52	Corey Kelly	So
DL	53	Ronnie Mageo	Jr
DL	54	David Marshall Jr.	Sr
OLB	55	Jaylin Jones	So
DL	57	Christopher Johnson	Fr
DL	59	Devonte Tezino	Jr
DL	64	Braylen Jackson	Jr
DL	88	Samu Taumanupepe	So
DL	90	Alessandro Lorenzetti	Jr
DL	91	Adonis Friloux	GS
DL	92	Trent Thomas	So
DL	93	DK Kalu	So
DL	94	Caden Boenig	Fr
DL	96	Tonga Lolohea	Sr
DL	97	Cooper Lanz	Sr
DL	98	Jackson Blackwell	Fr

Special teams

Pos.	#	Name	Class
LS	60	Drake Knobloch	Jr
LS	93	Dylan Schaub	So
P	94	Palmer Williams	Jr
K	96	Connor Hawkins	Fr
K	97	Hayden Arnold	So
K	98	Rhett Armstrong	Fr

Head coach

- Dave Aranda

Coordinators/assistant coaches

- Khenon Hall
  Associate Head Coach and Running Backs Coach
- Jake Spavital
  Offensive Coordinator and Quarterbacks
- Paul Gonzales
  Defensive Pass-Game Coordinator and Cornerbacks
- Matt Powledge
  Defensive Coordinator and Safeties
- Mark Scott
  Special Teams Coordinator
- Jarrett Anderson
  Tight Ends
- Dallas Baker
  Wide Receivers
- Inoke Breckterfield
  Defensive Line
- Jamar Chaney
  Inside Linebackers
- Mason Miller
  Offensive Line
- Carson Hall
  Outside Linebackers
- Rhett Holcomb
  Quarterbacks
- Anthony Marciano
  Linebackers
- Jeff Grigus
  Chief of Staff

Legend

- (C) Team captain
- (S) Suspended
- (I) Ineligible
- Injured
- Redshirt

Roster

=== Transfers ===
==== Transfers in ====
Player	Pos	Class	Height	Weight	Previous school
Kobe Prentice	WR	JR	5'10"	175 lbs	Alabama
Matthew Fobbs-White	EDGE	SO	6'3"	235 lbs	Tulane
Phoenix Jackson	LB	RS-JR	6'0"	220 lbs	Fresno State
Devin Turner	S	JR	6'1"	184 lbs	Northwestern
Drake Knobloch	LS	RS-SO	6'3"	255 lbs	Iowa State
Samu Taumanupepe	DL	RS-FR	6'3"	375 lbs	Texas A&M
Joe Crocker	OT	RS-FR	6'6"	318 lbs	Louisville
Travion Barnes	LB	SO	6'0"	210 lbs	FIU
Tyler Turner	S	RS-FR	5'11"	180 lbs	Oregon
Walker White	QB	FR	6'3"	225 lbs	Auburn
Emar'rion Winston	LB	RS-SO	6'3"	240 lbs	Oregon
Kole Wilson	WR	SO	5'9"	170 lbs	Texas State
Calvin Simpson-Hunt	CB	SO	5'11"	190 lbs	Ohio State
Adonis Friloux	DL	RS-JR	6'1"	270 lbs	Tulane
Caldra Williford	CB	JR	5'9"	156 lbs	Tennessee Tech
Ryne Shackelford	WR	RS-SO	6'0"	175 lbs	Purdue
Alessandro Lorenzetti	DL	JR	6'6"	275 lbs	Michigan
KJ Makins	CB	SR	5'9"	165 lbs	Houston Christian
Louis Brown IV	WR	SR	6'2"	180 lbs	Colorado State
Connor Cameron	OT	FR	6'6"	300 lbs	Arizona State
Jaylin Jones	EDGE	FR	6'5"	210 lbs	UTEP
Placide Djungu-Sungu	S	RS-JR	6'1"	194 lbs	Duke
Tyler Kirkwood	WR	RS-SR	6'0	185 lbs	Southern
Keystone Allison	OL	RS-FR	6'3"	274 lbs	Louisiana Tech
Braylen Jackson	DL	RS-SO	6'4"	289 lbs	SMU

==== Transfers out ====
Player	Pos	Class	Height	Weight	New School
Trey Wilson	DL	SO	6'3"	245 lbs	SMU
Isaiah Dunson	CB	RS-JR	6'1"	180 lbs	Georgia State
Kaian Roberts-Day	TE	RS-SO	6'3"	232 lbs	UTSA
Corey Gordon	S	RS-SO	6'1"	174 lbs	Louisville
DeQuan Finn	QB	RS-SR	6'1"	210 lbs	Miami (OH)
JaQues Evans	EDGE	SR	6'2"	225 lbs	Colorado State
Jonah Burton	WR	RS-JR	5'10"	190 lbs	Idaho State
Carmello Jones	LB	RS-SO	6'2"	211 lbs	Jackson State
Tay'Shawn Wilson	CB	RS-FR	5'8.5"	175 lbs	Prairie View A&M
Alvin Ebosele	OT	RS-SO	6'6"	295 lbs	Houston
Garrison Grimes	LS	RS-JR	6'2"	216 lbs	BYU
Dominic Richardson	RB	SR	6'0"	205 lbs	New Mexico State
Isaiah Hankins	K	RS-JR	6'1"	194 lbs	Colorado State
Jaden Maronen	LB	RS-JR	6'0"	216 lbs	Lamar
Richard Reese	RB	JR	5'10"	175 lbs	Stephen F. Austin
Joshua Lair	S	FR	6'0.5"	185 lbs	Undecided
Romario Noel	S	RS-JR	6'3"	210 lbs	Abilene Christian
Cameron Bonner	WR	RS-JR	5'11"	173 lbs	Prairie View A&M
Brendan Bett	DL	SO	6'5"	270 lbs	Florida
Caleb James	DL	SR	5'11"	302 lbs	Ole Miss
Brayson McHenry	QB	RS-SO	6'0"	202 lbs	Arkansas
