= 2025 Ball State Cardinals football team =

American college football season

2025 Ball State Cardinals football
- Conference: Mid-American Conference
- Record: 4–8 (3–5 MAC)
- Head coach: Mike Uremovich (1st season)
- Offensive scheme: Multiple
- Defensive coordinator: Jeff Knowles (2nd season)
- Base defense: 3–4
- Home stadium: Scheumann Stadium

2025 Mid-American Conference football standings
| | Conf. | | | Overall |
| Team | W | | L | W | | L |
|---|---|---|---|---|---|---|
| Western Michigan y$ | 7 | – | 1 | 10 | – | 4 |
| Miami (OH) y | 6 | – | 2 | 7 | – | 7 |
| Ohio | 6 | – | 2 | 9 | – | 4 |
| Toledo | 6 | – | 2 | 8 | – | 5 |
| Central Michigan | 5 | – | 3 | 7 | – | 6 |
| Akron* | 4 | – | 4 | 5 | – | 7 |
| Buffalo | 4 | – | 4 | 5 | – | 7 |
| Kent State | 4 | – | 4 | 5 | – | 7 |
| Eastern Michigan | 3 | – | 5 | 4 | – | 8 |
| Ball State | 3 | – | 5 | 4 | – | 8 |
| Bowling Green | 2 | – | 6 | 4 | – | 8 |
| Northern Illinois | 2 | – | 6 | 3 | – | 9 |
| UMass | 0 | – | 8 | 0 | – | 12 |
Championship: Western Michigan 23, Miami (OH) 13
$ – Conference champion; y – Championship game participant; * Ineligible for postseason play due to low APR score

The 2025 Ball State Cardinals football team represented Ball State University as a member of the Mid-American Conference (MAC) during the 2025 NCAA Division I FBS football season. The Cardinals were led by Mike Uremovich in his first year as the head coach. The Cardinals played home games at Scheumann Stadium, located in Muncie, Indiana.

== Offseason ==
=== Transfers ===
==== Outgoing ====
| Player | Position | Destination |
|---|---|---|
| Arkel Anugwom | OL | Alabama |
| Vaughn Pemberton | RB | Boston College |
| Dantu Gardner | EDGE | Butler |
| Nick Munson | WR | Butler |
| Blair Schonhorst | CB | Butler |
| Thailand Baldwin | DB | Charlotte |
| Taran Tyo | OL | Cincinnati |
| Malcolm Gillie | WR | Coastal Carolina |
| Chase Harrison | QB | Findlay |
| Christian Davis | RB | Findlay |
| L'Cier Luter | DL | FIU |
| Preston Ross | TE | Furman |
| Ty Curran | WR | Holy Cross |
| Christian Abney | TE | Illinois |
| Justin Bowick | WR | Illinois |
| Jordan Coleman | CB | Illinois State |
| Danny Royster | DE | Indianapolis |
| Cam Pickett | WR | Kansas |
| Rob Fogler | OT | Kentucky |
| Eli Freeman | IOL | Lindenwood |
| Khalib Gilmore | LB | Norfolk State |
| Jackson Courville | K | Ohio State |
| Elijah Davis | S | Robert Morris |
| R.J. Mukes III | WR | Robert Morris |
| DJ Williams | RB | Sacred Heart |
| Myles Norwood | DB | South Carolina |
| Ethan Evers | LB | Tiffin (D2) |
| Kadin Semonza | QB | Tulane |
| DD Snyder | S | UMass |
| Ameir Glenn | DL | Wake Forest |
| Dakari Frazier | DL | Western Michigan |
| Khani McNeese | DB | Winona State (D2) |
| Tanner Koziol | TE | Wisconsin |
| AJ Taylor | CB | Unknown |
| Ky Montgomery | DL | Unknown |
| Yaser Alawadi | OT | Unknown |
| Jeffrey Simmons | TE | Unknown |
| Kiael Kelly | QB | Withdrawn |
| Qian Magwood | WR | Withdrawn |
| Caden Johnson | LB | Withdrawn |

==== Incoming ====
| Player | Position | Previous school |
|---|---|---|
| Otto Hess | IOL | Boston College |
| Nathan Voorhis | DL | Bryant |
| Roman Pearson | DB | Bucknell |
| Eric Weatherly | WR | Bucknell |
| Drew Cassens | TE | Butler |
| Adam Dolan | OL | Butler |
| Ashton Nawrocki | EDGE | Butler |
| Deondre Shepherd | S | Coastal Carolina |
| Walter Taylor III | QB | Colorado |
| Micah Wing | LB | Dodge City CC |
| Koby Gross | TE | Florida A&M |
| Qua Ashley | RB | Kennesaw State |
| Avery Stuart | S | Kentucky |
| Brody Boehm | K | Missouri |
| Ashton Whitner | S | Old Dominion |
| Donovan Hamilton | WR | Purdue |
| Elijah Jackson | RB | Purdue |
| Jordan King | IOL | Purdue |
| Aaron Roberts | OT | Purdue |
| DC Pippin | K | Southeast Missouri State |
| Alfred Chea | S | UConn |
| George Okorie | EDGE | Vanderbilt |
| Ameir Glenn | DL | Wake Forest |
| Adam Saul | P | Washington |
| Ben Dutton | TE | Washington State |
| Michael Gravely Jr. | S | Western Michigan |
| Bradyn Flehart | QB | Yale |

=== Coaching staff additions ===
| Name | New Position | Previous Team | Previous Position | Source |
|---|---|---|---|---|
| Mike Uremovich | Head coach | Butler | Head coach | |
| Adam Siwicki | Defensive run game coordinator/Defensive line | Butler | Defensive coordinator/Defensive line | |
| Rory Mannering | Safeties | Butler | Assistant head coach/Linebackers | |
| Alex Barr | Offensive line | Butler | Offensive coordinator | |
| Sean Chase | Tight ends | Butler | Run game coordinator/Tight ends/Running backs | |
| Ray Holmes | Inside receivers | Butler | Pass game coordinator/Wide receivers | |
| Ray Smith | Defensive pass game coordinator/Cornerbacks | Kennesaw State | Defensive backs/Corners | |
| Craig Harmon | Offensive pass game coordinator/Quarterbacks | Benet Academy | Head coach | |
| Madison Bunch | Running backs | Southeast Missouri State | Running backs/Specialists | |
| Jalen Moss | Snipers | Butler | Cornerbacks | |
| Nick Fiacable | Special teams | UConn | Special teams analyst | |

== Preseason ==
The MAC Football Kickoff was held on Thursday, July 24, 2025, at the Ford Field in Detroit, Michigan from 9:00 am EDT to 1:30 pm EDT.

=== Preseason polls ===
==== Coaches Poll ====
On July 24 the MAC announced the preseason coaches' poll.

MAC Coaches poll
| Predicted finish | Team | Votes (1st place) |
| 1 | Toledo | 135 (7) |
| 2 | Miami | 131 (3) |
| 3 | Ohio | 123 (3) |
| 4 | Buffalo | 115 |
| 5 | Northern Illinois | 94 |
| 6 | Bowling Green | 81 |
| 7 | Western Michigan | 71 |
| 8 | Eastern Michigan | 68 |
| 9 | Central Michigan | 65 |
| 10 | Ball State | 41 |
| T11 | Akron | 39 |
| T11 | Massachusetts | 39 |
| 13 | Kent State | 12 |

Coaches poll (MAC Championship)
| Predicted finish | Team | Votes |
| 1 | Toledo | 6 |
| 2 | Miami | 4 |
| 3 | Ohio | 3 |

== Schedule ==
| Date | Time | Opponent | Site | TV | Result | Attendance |
|---|---|---|---|---|---|---|
| August 30 | 12:00 p.m. | at Purdue* | Ross–Ade Stadium; West Lafayette, IN | BTN | L 0–31 | 53,994 |
| September 6 | 7:30 p.m. | at Auburn* | Jordan–Hare Stadium; Auburn, AL | ESPNU | L 3–42 | 88,043 |
| September 13 | 2:00 p.m. | No. 23 (FCS) New Hampshire* | Scheumann Stadium; Muncie, IN | ESPN+ | W 34–29 | 10,512 |
| September 20 | 3:30 p.m. | at UConn* | Pratt & Whitney Stadium at Rentschler Field; East Hartford, CT | CBSSN | L 25–31 | 25,025 |
| October 4 | 12:00 p.m. | Ohio | Scheumann Stadium; Muncie, IN | CBSSN | W 20–14 | 8,427 |
| October 11 | 3:30 p.m. | at Western Michigan | Waldo Stadium; Kalamazoo, MI | ESPN+ | L 0–42 | 20,032 |
| October 18 | 3:30 p.m. | Akron | Scheumann Stadium; Muncie, IN | ESPN+ | W 42–28 | 12,248 |
| October 25 | 2:30 p.m. | at Northern Illinois | Huskie Stadium; DeKalb, IL (Bronze Stalk Trophy) | ESPN+ | L 7–21 | 10,124 |
| November 5 | 7:00 p.m. | Kent State | Scheumann Stadium; Muncie, IN | ESPNU | W 17–13 | 5,225 |
| November 15 | 12:00 p.m. | Eastern Michigan | Scheumann Stadium; Muncie, IN | ESPN+ | L 9–24 | 8,430 |
| November 22 | 2:00 p.m. | at Toledo | Glass Bowl; Toledo, OH | ESPN+ | L 9–38 | 15,127 |
| November 29 | 12:00 p.m. | at Miami (OH) | Yager Stadium; Oxford, OH | CBSSN | L 24–45 | 11,137 |
*Non-conference game; Rankings from AP Poll and CFP Rankings released prior to game; All times are in Eastern time

== Game summaries ==
=== at Purdue ===
Ball State Cardinals (0–0) at Purdue Boilermakers (0–0) – Game summary

| Quarter | 1 | 2 | 3 | 4 | Total |
|---|---|---|---|---|---|
| Cardinals | 0 | 0 | 0 | 0 | 0 |
| Boilermakers | 14 | 7 | 7 | 3 | 31 |

at Ross–Ade Stadium • West Lafayette, Indiana

- Date: August 30
- Game time: 12:00 p.m.
- Game weather: Sunny • Temperature: 68 °F (20 °C) • Wind: N at 1 mile per hour (1.6 km/h)
- Game attendance: 53,994
- Referee: Jeff Servinski
- TV announcers (BTN): Jason Ross Jr. (play-by-play) and Anthony Herron (analyst)

Game information

First quarter

- PUR – Arhmad Branch 49-yard pass from Ryan Browne (Spencer Porath kick), 14:20. Boilermakers 7–0. Drive: 2 plays, 72 yards, 0:36.
- PUR – Ryan Browne 5-yard run (Spencer Porath kick), 9:47. Boilermakers 14–0. Drive: 6 plays, 71 yards, 2:55.

Second quarter

- PUR – Devin Mockobee 4-yard run (Spencer Porath kick), 10:21. Boilermakers 21–0. Drive: 13 plays, 91 yards, 5:26.

Third quarter

- PUR – Michael Jackson III 14-yard pass from Ryan Browne (Spencer Porath kick), 4:40. Boilermakers 28–0. Drive: 7 plays, 73 yards, 2:38.

Fourth quarter

- PUR – Spencer Porath 28-yard field goal, 9:59. Boilermakers 31–0. Drive: 13 plays, 61 yards, 5:01.

| Statistics | BALL | PUR |
|---|---|---|
| First downs | 13 | 23 |
| Plays–yards | 52–203 | 59–433 |
| Rushes–yards | 36–116 | 30–93 |
| Passing yards | 87 | 340 |
| Passing: comp–att–int | 10–16–0 | 20–29–0 |
| Turnovers | 0 | 0 |
| Time of possession | 33:40 | 26:20 |

| Team | Category | Player | Statistics |
|---|---|---|---|
| Ball State | Passing | Kiael Kelly | 10/16, 87 yards |
| Ball State | Rushing | Kiael Kelly | 22 carries, 63 yards |
| Ball State | Receiving | Elijah Jackson | 1 reception, 37 yards |
| Purdue | Passing | Ryan Browne | 18/26, 311 yards, 2 TD |
| Purdue | Rushing | Devin Mockobee | 14 carries, 59 yds, TD |
| Purdue | Receiving | Arhmad Branch | 3 receptions, 101 yards, TD |

=== at Auburn ===
Ball State Cardinals (0–1) at Auburn Tigers (1–0) – Game summary

| Quarter | 1 | 2 | 3 | 4 | Total |
|---|---|---|---|---|---|
| Cardinals | 0 | 0 | 3 | 0 | 3 |
| Tigers | 14 | 7 | 7 | 14 | 42 |

at Jordan-Hare Stadium • Auburn, Alabama

- Date: September 6
- Game time: 6:30 PM CDT
- Game weather: Cloudy • Temperature: 80 °F (27 °C)
- Game attendance: 88,043
- Referee: Matt Loeffler
- TV announcers (ESPNU): Lowell Galindo (play-by-play), Aaron Murray (analyst), and Lauren Sisler (sideline reporter)

Game information

First quarter

- AUB – Jeremiah Cobb 46-yard run (Alex McPherson kick), 4:15. Auburn 7–0. Drive: 2 plays, 55 yards, 0:42.
- AUB – Eric Singleton Jr. 30-yard pass from Jackson Arnold (Alex McPherson kick), 0:44. Auburn 14–0. Drive: 3 plays, 50 yards, 1:11.

Second quarter

- AUB – Horatio Fields 11-yard pass from Jackson Arnold (Alex McPherson kick), 0:37. Auburn 21–0. Drive: 9 plays, 67 yards, 3:14.

Third quarter

- AUB – Jeremiah Cobb 45-yard run (Alex McPherson kick), 7:32. Auburn 28–0. Drive: 4 plays, 79 yards, 1:40.
- BSU – Carson Holmer 22-yard field goal, 1:04. Auburn 28–3. Drive: 7 plays, 19 yards, 3:50.

Fourth quarter

- AUB – Eric Singleton Jr. 13-yard pass from Jackson Arnold (Alex McPherson kick), 12:22. Auburn 35–3. Drive: 9 plays, 72 yards, 3:36.
- AUB – Durell Robinson 54-yard run (Alex McPherson kick), 5:13. Auburn 42–3. Drive: 1 play, 54 yards, 0:10.

| Statistics | BSU | AUB |
|---|---|---|
| First downs | 6 | 27 |
| Plays–yards | 49–68 | 67–495 |
| Rushes–yards | 33–-3 | 34–224 |
| Passing yards | 71 | 271 |
| Passing: comp–att–int | 10–16–0 | 26–33–0 |
| Turnovers | 1 | 1 |
| Time of possession | 30:15 | 29:45 |

| Team | Category | Player | Statistics |
|---|---|---|---|
| Ball State | Passing | Kiael Kelly | 10/16, 71 yards |
| Ball State | Rushing | Qua Ashley | 12 carries, 10 yards |
| Ball State | Receiving | Eric Weatherly | 5 receptions, 42 yards |
| Auburn | Passing | Jackson Arnold | 24/28, 251 yards, 3 TD |
| Auburn | Rushing | Jeremiah Cobb | 11 carries, 121 yards, 2 TD |
| Auburn | Receiving | Cam Coleman | 7 receptions, 77 yards |

=== No. 23 (FCS) New Hampshire ===
No. 23 (FCS) New Hampshire Wildcats (2–0) at Ball State Cardinals (0–2) – Game summary

| Quarter | 1 | 2 | 3 | 4 | Total |
|---|---|---|---|---|---|
| No. 23 (FCS) Wildcats | 14 | 7 | 3 | 5 | 29 |
| Cardinals | 14 | 14 | 6 | 0 | 34 |

at Scheumann Stadium • Muncie, Indiana

- Date: September 13
- Game time: 2:00 PM EDT
- Game weather: Rain • Temperature: 81 °F (27 °C) • Wind: SW at 6 miles per hour (9.7 km/h)
- Game attendance: 10,512
- Referee: Rick Warne
- TV announcers (ESPN+): Jack Kizer (play-by-play) and Ryan Cavanaugh (analyst)

Game information

First quarter

- UNH – Brendan Tighe 30-yard blocked punt return (Nick Reed kick), 13:53. Wildcats 7–0.
- BALL – Kiael Kelly 40-yard run (Carson Holmer kick), 10:48. Tied 7–7. Drive: 6 plays, 69 yards, 2:57.
- UNH – Chase Wilson 13-yard pass from Matt Vezza (Nick Reed kick), 5:22. Wildcats 14–7. Drive: 10 plays, 75 yards, 5:27.
- BALL – Qua Ashley 43-yard run (Carson Holmer kick), 4:29. Tied 14–14. Drive: 2 plays, 64 yards, 0:53.

Second quarter

- BALL – Qua Ashley 72-yard run (Carson Holmer kick), 7:12. Cardinals 21–14. Drive: 2 plays, 80 yards, 0:42.
- UNH – Matt Vezza 2-yard run (Nick Reed kick), 1:47. Tied 21–21. Drive: 13 plays, 75 yards, 5:25.
- BALL – Kameron Anthony 10-yard pass from Kiael Kelly (Carson Holmer kick), 0:20. Cardinals 28–21. Drive: 7 plays, 75 yards, 1:27.

Third quarter

- BALL – Qua Ashley 27-yard pass from Kiael Kelly (pass failed), 9:56. Cardinals 34–21. Drive: 8 plays, 74 yards, 4:02.
- UNH – Nick Reed 52-yard field goal, 3:46. Cardinals 34–24. Drive: 13 plays, 59 yards, 6:04.

Fourth quarter

- UNH – Team Safety, 8:10. Cardinals 34–26.
- UNH – Nick Reed 29-yard field goal, 4:16. Cardinals 34–29. Drive: 7 plays, 49 yards, 3:46.

| Statistics | UNH | BALL |
|---|---|---|
| First downs | 22 | 21 |
| Plays–yards | 79–391 | 51–413 |
| Rushes–yards | 34–132 | 36–308 |
| Passing yards | 259 | 105 |
| Passing: Comp–Att–Int | 25–45–0 | 9–15–1 |
| Turnovers | 0 | 2 |
| Time of possession | 38:05 | 21:55 |

| Team | Category | Player | Statistics |
|---|---|---|---|
| New Hampshire | Passing | Matt Vezza | 25/44, 259 yards, TD |
| New Hampshire | Rushing | Matt Vezza | 16 carries, 78 yards, TD |
| New Hampshire | Receiving | Caleb Burke | 7 receptions, 89 yards |
| Ball State | Passing | Kiael Kelly | 9/15, 105 yards, 2 TD, INT |
| Ball State | Rushing | Qua Ashley | 12 carries, 154 yards, 2 TD |
| Ball State | Receiving | Qua Ashley | 2 receptions, 33 yards, TD |

=== at UConn ===
Ball State Cardinals (1–2) at UConn Huskies (1–2) – Game summary

| Quarter | 1 | 2 | 3 | 4 | Total |
|---|---|---|---|---|---|
| Cardinals | 0 | 7 | 3 | 15 | 25 |
| Huskies | 10 | 0 | 7 | 14 | 31 |

at Rentschler Field • East Hartford, Connecticut

- Date: September 20
- Game time: 3:30 PM EDT
- Game weather: Sunny • Temperature: 71 °F (22 °C) • Wind: N at 5 miles per hour (8.0 km/h)
- Game attendance: 25,025
- Referee: Garrett Dickerson
- TV announcers (CBSSN): Fran Charles (play-by-play), Taylor McHargue (analyst) & Hailey Sutton (sideline)

Game information

First quarter

- CONN - Chris Freeman 30-yard field goal, 9:48. Huskies 3–0. Drive: 4 plays, 7 yards, 01:47.
- CONN - Skyler Bell 2-yard pass from Joe Fagnano (Chris Freeman kick), 2:30. Huskies 10–0. Drive: 10 plays, 85 yards, 05:36.

Second quarter

- BALL - Kiael Kelly 19-yard pass from Qian Magwood (Carson Holmer kick), 14:53. Huskies 10–7. Drive: 6 plays, 83 yards, 02:32.

Third quarter

- CONN - Terrence Smith 1-yard run (Chris Freeman kick), 6:04. Huskies 17–7. Drive: 14 plays, 60 yards, 05:45.
- BALL - Carson Holmer 23-yard field goal, 0:37. Huskies 17–10. Drive: 11 plays, 69 yards, 05:27.

Fourth quarter

- CONN - Cam Edwards 32-yard run (Chris Freeman kick), 10:24. Huskies 24–10. Drive: 10 plays, 67 yards, 05:09.
- BALL - Qua Ashley 1-yard run (Carson Holmer kick), 3:28. Huskies 24–17. Drive: 8 plays, 65 yards, 03:10.
- CONN - Cam Edwards 67-yard run (Chris Freeman kick), 1:50. Huskies 31–17. Drive: 3 plays, 68 yards, 01:35.
- BALL - Dahya Patel 11-yard pass from Kiael Kelly (Kiael Kelly–Koby Gross pass), 0:09. Huskies 31–25. Drive: 6 plays, 65 yards, 01:30.

| Statistics | BALL | CONN |
|---|---|---|
| First downs | 19 | 17 |
| Plays–yards | 62–404 | 67–398 |
| Rushes–yards | 37–176 | 37–217 |
| Passing yards | 228 | 181 |
| Passing: Comp–Att–Int | 18-25-1 | 20-30-0 |
| Turnovers | 1 | 0 |
| Time of possession | 27:44 | 32:16 |

| Team | Category | Player | Statistics |
|---|---|---|---|
| Ball State | Passing | Kiael Kelly | 17/24, 209 yards, TD |
| Ball State | Rushing | Qua Ashley | 18 carries, 86 yards, TD |
| Ball State | Receiving | Donovan Hamilton | 7 receptions, 61 yards |
| UConn | Passing | Joe Fagnano | 20/30, 181 yards, TD |
| UConn | Rushing | Cam Edwards | 24 carries, 194 yards, 2 TD |
| UConn | Receiving | Skyler Bell | 14 receptions, 113 yards, TD |

=== Ohio ===
Ohio Bobcats (3–2) at Ball State Cardinals (1–3) – Game summary

| Quarter | 1 | 2 | 3 | 4 | Total |
|---|---|---|---|---|---|
| Bobcats | 7 | 7 | 0 | 0 | 14 |
| Cardinals | 0 | 0 | 10 | 10 | 20 |

at Scheumann Stadium • Muncie, Indiana

- Date: October 4
- Game time: 12:00 PM EDT
- Game weather: Sunny • Temperature: 81 °F (27 °C) • Wind: SW at 6 miles per hour (9.7 km/h)
- Game attendance: 8,427
- Referee: Chris La Mange
- TV announcers (CBSSN): Fran Charles (play-by-play) and Randy Cross (analyst)

Game information

First quarter

- (04:39) OHIO – Duncan Brune 1-yard run (David Dellenbach kick), 5 plays, 50 yards, 1:58 OHIO 7–0

Second quarter

- (03:24) OHIO – Rodney Harris II 23-yard pass from Parker Navarro (David Dellenbach kick), 9 plays, 70 yards, 3:57; OHIO 14–0

Third quarter

- (07:05) BALL – Kiael Kelly 13-yard run (Carson Holmer Kick), 11 plays, 80 yards, 5:27; OHIO 14–7
- (00:25) BALL – Carson Holmer 22-yard field goal, 8 plays, 48 yards, 3:23; OHIO 14–10

Fourth quarter

- (08:39) BALL – -1-yard team safety; OHIO 14–12
- (00:57) BALL – Qian Magwood 43-yard pass from Kiael Kelly (Kiael Kelly Pass to Donovan Hamilton), 9 plays, 70 yards, 2:07; BALL 20–14

| Statistics | OHIO | BALL |
|---|---|---|
| First downs | 18 | 20 |
| Plays–yards | 66–356 | 75–357 |
| Rushes–yards | 37–168 | 42–172 |
| Passing yards | 188 | 185 |
| Passing: Comp–Att–Int | 16–29–0 | 17–33–0 |
| Turnovers | 0 | 0 |
| Time of possession | 28:09 | 31:51 |

| Team | Category | Player | Statistics |
|---|---|---|---|
| Ohio | Passing | Parker Navarro | 16/29, 188 yards, TD |
| Ohio | Rushing | Parker Navarro | 13 carries, 77 yards |
| Ohio | Receiving | Chase Hendricks | 8 receptions, 104 yards |
| Ball State | Passing | Kiael Kelly | 17/33, 185 yards |
| Ball State | Rushing | Kiael Kelly | 29 carries, 66 yards, TD |
| Ball State | Receiving | Qian Magwood | 4 receptions, 92 yards, TD |

=== at Western Michigan ===
Ball State Cardinals (2–3) at Western Michigan Broncos (3–3) – Game summary

| Quarter | 1 | 2 | 3 | 4 | Total |
|---|---|---|---|---|---|
| Cardinals | 0 | 0 | 0 | 0 | 0 |
| Broncos | 7 | 14 | 7 | 14 | 42 |

at Waldo Stadium • Kalamazoo, Michigan

- Date: October 11
- Game time: 3:30 p.m. EDT
- Game weather: Cloudy • Temperature: 64 °F (18 °C) • Wind: NE at 5 miles per hour (8.0 km/h)
- Game attendance: 20,032
- Referee: Billy Williams
- TV announcers (ESPN+): Shawn Kenney (play-by-play) and Marcus Ray (analyst)

Game information

First quarter

- (1:56) WMU – Ofa Mataele 1-yard run, Palmer Domschke kick (Drive: 3 plays, 55 yards, 1:22; Western Michigan 7-0)

Second quarter

- (13:47) WMU – Michael Brescia 5-yard pass from Broc Lowry, Palmer Domschke kick (Drive: 4 plays, 27 yards, 1:28; Western Michigan 14-0)
- (8:16) WMU – Jalen Buckley 2-yard run, Palmer Domschke kick (Drive: 6 plays, 73 yards, 2:39; Western Michigan 21-0)

Third quarter

- (7:59) WMU – Aveion Chenault 14-yard pass from Broc Lowry, Palmer Domschke kick (Drive: 8 plays, 73 yards, 3:25; Western Michigan 28-0)

Fourth quarter

- (8:26) WMU – Broc Lowry 37-yard run, Palmer Domschke kick (Drive: 8 plays, 73 yards, 3:25; Western Michigan 35-0)
- (3:42) WMU – Cade Conley 1-yard pass from Brady Jones, Palmer Domschke kick (Drive: 8 plays, 27 yards, 4:09; Western Michigan 42-0)

| Statistics | BALL | WMU |
|---|---|---|
| First downs | 5 | 25 |
| Plays–yards | 50–88 | 73–461 |
| Rushes–yards | 27–20 | 44–219 |
| Passing yards | 68 | 242 |
| Passing: Comp–Att–Int | 13–23–0 | 24–29–1 |
| Turnovers | 2 | 2 |
| Time of possession | 24:23 | 35:37 |

| Team | Category | Player | Statistics |
|---|---|---|---|
| Ball State | Passing | Kiael Kelly | 13/22, 68 yards |
| Ball State | Rushing | Qua Ashley | 6 carries, 17 yards |
| Ball State | Receiving | Qian Magwood | 3 receptions, 26 yards |
| Western Michigan | Passing | Broc Lowry | 23/27, 241 yards, 2 TD |
| Western Michigan | Rushing | Broc Lowry | 13 carries, 108 yards, TD |
| Western Michigan | Receiving | Talique Williams | 5 receptions, 55 yards |

=== Akron ===
Akron Zips (2–5) at Ball State Cardinals (2–4) – Game summary

| Quarter | 1 | 2 | 3 | 4 | Total |
|---|---|---|---|---|---|
| Zips | 8 | 7 | 10 | 3 | 28 |
| Cardinals | 14 | 0 | 14 | 14 | 42 |

at Scheumann Stadium • Muncie, Indiana

- Date: October 18
- Game time: 3:30 p.m. EDT
- Game weather: Cloudy, 81 degrees
- Game attendance: 12,248
- Referee: Andrew Speciale
- TV announcers (ESPN+): Jason Ross Jr. (play-by-play) and Tyoka Jackson (analyst)

Game information

First quarter

- AKR – Israel Polk 19-yard pass from Ben Finley (Michael Johnson Jr–Max Whisner pass), 11:42. Zips 8–0. Drive: 5 plays, 34 yards, 1:56.
- BALL – Kiael Kelly 3-yard run (Carson Holmer kick), 6:13. Zips 8–7. Drive: 10 plays, 75 yards, 5:29.
- BALL – Kiael Kelly 26-yard run (Carson Holmer kick), 0:45. Cardinals 14–8. Drive: 7 plays, 72 yards, 4:31.

Second quarter

- AKR – Kyan Mason 37-yard pass from Ben Finley (Matthew Schramm kick), 1:26. Zips 15–14. Drive: 10 plays, 96 yards, 2:52.

Third quarter

- BALL – Qua Ashley 69-yard run (Carson Holmer kick), 9:54. Cardinals 21–15. Drive: 2 plays, 72 yards, 0:54.
- AKR – Matthew Schramm 29-yard field goal, 7:28. Cardinals 21–18. Drive: 8 plays, 63 yards, 2:26.
- BALL – Koby Gross 29-yard pass from Kiael Kelly (Carson Holmer kick), 5:52. Cardinals 28–18. Drive: 3 plays, 75 yards, 1:36.
- AKR – Israel Polk 4-yard pass from Ben Finley (Matthew Schramm kick), 0:24. Cardinals 28–25. Drive: 5 plays, 52 yards, 2:16.

Fourth quarter

- BALL – Kiael Kelly 1-yard run (Carson Holmer kick), 10:43. Cardinals 35–25. Drive: 9 plays, 75 yards, 4:41.
- AKR – Matthew Schramm 19-yard field goal, 5:47. Cardinals 35–28. Drive: 10 plays, 74 yards, 4:56.
- BALL – TJ Horton 90-yard kickoff return (Carson Holmer kick), 5:34. Cardinals 42–28.

| Statistics | AKR | BALL |
|---|---|---|
| First downs | 24 | 17 |
| Plays–yards | 75–419 | 65–374 |
| Rushes–yards | 35–128 | 45–216 |
| Passing yards | 291 | 158 |
| Passing: Comp–Att–Int | 22–40–2 | 11–20–1 |
| Turnovers | 2 | 2 |
| Time of possession | 28:08 | 31:52 |

| Team | Category | Player | Statistics |
|---|---|---|---|
| Akron | Passing | Ben Finley | 22/40, 291 yards, 3 TD, 2 INT |
| Akron | Rushing | Jordan Gant | 19 carries, 94 yards |
| Akron | Receiving | Tim Grear Jr. | 4 receptions, 87 yards |
| Ball State | Passing | Kiael Kelly | 10/19, 121 yards, TD, INT |
| Ball State | Rushing | Qua Ashley | 20 carries, 143 yards, TD |
| Ball State | Receiving | Koby Gross | 3 receptions, 81 yards, TD |

=== at Northern Illinois (Bronze Stalk Trophy) ===
Ball State Cardinals (3–4) at Northern Illinois Huskies (1–6) – Game summary

| Quarter | 1 | 2 | 3 | 4 | Total |
|---|---|---|---|---|---|
| Cardinals | 0 | 7 | 0 | 0 | 7 |
| Huskies | 7 | 0 | 7 | 7 | 21 |

at Huskie Stadium • DeKalb, Illinois

- Date: October 25
- Game time: 3:30 p.m. EDT
- Game weather: Cloudy • Temperature: 54 °F (12 °C) • Wind: NW at 9 miles per hour (14 km/h)
- Game attendance: 10,124
- Referee: Chris La Mange
- TV announcers (ESPN+): Jason Ross Jr. (play-by-play) and Forrest Conoly (analyst)

Game information

First quarter

- NIU – Telly Johnson Jr. 53-yard run (Andrew Glass kick), 11:41. Huskies 7–0. Drive: 3 plays, 60 yards, 1:08.

Second quarter

- BALL – Drew Cassens 1-yard pass from Kiael Kelly (Carson Holmer kick), 13:30. Tied 7–7. Drive: 11 plays, 80 yards, 5:13.

Third quarter

- NIU – Josh Holst 7-yard run (Andrew Glass kick), 7:26. Huskies 14–7. Drive: 15 plays, 78 yards, 7:30.

Fourth quarter

- NIU – DeAree Rogers 14-yard pass from Josh Holst (Andrew Glass kick), 13:59. Huskies 21–7. Drive: 4 plays, 25 yards, 1:25.

| Statistics | BALL | NIU |
|---|---|---|
| First downs | 15 | 17 |
| Plays–yards | 66–275 | 68–370 |
| Rushes–yards | 43–139 | 57–305 |
| Passing yards | 136 | 65 |
| Passing: Comp–Att–Int | 10-23-2 | 6-11-1 |
| Turnovers | 3 | 3 |
| Time of possession | 29:30 | 30:30 |

| Team | Category | Player | Statistics |
|---|---|---|---|
| Ball State | Passing | Kiael Kelly | 10/23, 136 yards, TD, 2 INT |
| Ball State | Rushing | Kiael Kelly | 27 carries, 86 yards |
| Ball State | Receiving | Ty Robinson | 3 receptions, 37 yards |
| Northern Illinois | Passing | Josh Holst | 6/11, 65 yards, TD, INT |
| Northern Illinois | Rushing | Chavon Wright | 27 carries, 166 yards |
| Northern Illinois | Receiving | DeAree Rogers | 3 receptions, 43 yards, TD |

=== Kent State ===
Kent State Golden Flashes (3–5) at Ball State Cardinals (3–5) – Game summary

| Quarter | 1 | 2 | 3 | 4 | Total |
|---|---|---|---|---|---|
| Golden Flashes | 0 | 3 | 7 | 3 | 13 |
| Cardinals | 3 | 7 | 0 | 7 | 17 |

at Scheumann Stadium • Muncie, Indiana

- Date: November 5
- Game time: 7:00 p.m. EDT
- Game weather: Clear • Temperature: 52 °F (11 °C) • Wind: NW at 17 miles per hour (27 km/h)
- Game attendance: 5,225
- Referee: Rick Warne
- TV announcers (ESPNU): Matt Schumacker (play-by-play) and Dustin Fox (analyst)

Game information

First quarter

- (11:59) BALL – DC Pippin 25-yard field goal (Drive: 4 plays, 5 yards, 1:54; Ball State 3–0)

Second quarter

- (13:31) BALL – TJ Horton 1-yard pass from Kiael Kelly, DC Pippin kick (Drive: 13 plays, 50 yards, 6:34; Ball State 10–0)
- (6:18) KENT – Will Hryszko 39-yard field goal (Drive: 13 plays, 56 yards, 7:06; Ball State 10–3)

Third quarter

- (4:42) KENT – Donovan Delaney Jr. 4-yard run, Will Hryszko kick (Drive: 2 plays, 10 yards, 0:40; Tied 10–10)

Fourth quarter

- (11:07) KENT – Will Hryszko 28-yard field goal (Drive: 9 plays, 56 yards, 4:28; Kent State 13–10)
- (1:53) BALL – Kameron Anthony 29-yard pass from Kiael Kelly, DC Pippin kick (Drive: 4 plays, 37 yards, 1:52; Ball State 17–13)

| Statistics | KENT | BALL |
|---|---|---|
| First downs | 14 | 15 |
| Plays–yards | 61–301 | 62–238 |
| Rushes–yards | 33–89 | 33–65 |
| Passing yards | 212 | 173 |
| Passing: Comp–Att–Int | 15–28–1 | 17–29–0 |
| Turnovers | 1 | 0 |
| Time of possession | 27:42 | 32:18 |

| Team | Category | Player | Statistics |
|---|---|---|---|
| Kent State | Passing | Dru DeShields | 15/27, 212 yards |
| Kent State | Rushing | Gavin Garcia | 12 carries, 59 yards |
| Kent State | Receiving | Wayne Harris | 5 receptions, 87 yards |
| Ball State | Passing | Kiael Kelly | 17/29, 173 yards, 2 TD |
| Ball State | Rushing | Kiael Kelly | 21 carries, 53 yards |
| Ball State | Receiving | Kameron Anthony | 2 receptions, 39 yards, TD |

=== Eastern Michigan ===
Eastern Michigan Eagles (3–7) at Ball State Cardinals (4–5) – Game summary

| Quarter | 1 | 2 | 3 | 4 | Total |
|---|---|---|---|---|---|
| Eagles | 7 | 10 | 0 | 7 | 24 |
| Cardinals | 0 | 3 | 3 | 3 | 9 |

at Scheumann Stadium • Muncie, Indiana

- Date: November 15
- Game time: 12:00 p.m. EDT
- Game attendance: 8,430
- Referee: Billy Williams
- TV announcers (ESPN+): Michael Reghi (play-by-play) and Je'Rod Cherry (analyst)

Game information

First quarter

- EMU – Noah Kim 1-yard run (Rudy Kessinger kick), 9:19. Eagles 7–0. Drive: 9 plays, 58 yards, 4:13.

Second quarter

- BALL – DC Pippin 42-yard field goal, 12:16. Eagles 7–3. Drive: 7 plays, 30 yards, 2:56.
- EMU – Jamarien Wheeler 43-yard pass from Noah Kim (Rudy Kessinger kick), 7:49. Eagles 14–3. Drive: 4 plays, 55 yards, 1:30.
- EMU – Rudy Kessinger 43-yard field goal, 0:22. Eagles 17–3. Drive: 9 plays, 42 yards, 1:10.

Third quarter

- BALL – DC Pippin 25-yard field goal, 10:04. Eagles 17–6. Drive: 9 plays, 40 yards, 4:06.

Fourth quarter

- EMU – Tavierre Dunlap 36-yard run (Rudy Kessinger kick), 11:49. Eagles 24–6. Drive: 7 plays, 81 yards, 3:07.
- BALL – DC Pippin 38-yard field goal, 9:13. Eagles 24–9. Drive: 6 plays, 14 yards, 2:26.

| Statistics | EMU | BALL |
|---|---|---|
| First downs | 21 | 13 |
| Plays–yards | 69–380 | 60–225 |
| Rushes–yards | 40–151 | 38–163 |
| Passing yards | 229 | 62 |
| Passing: Comp–Att–Int | 18–29–2 | 13–22–1 |
| Turnovers | 2 | 1 |
| Time of possession | 31:09 | 28:51 |

| Team | Category | Player | Statistics |
|---|---|---|---|
| Eastern Michigan | Passing | Noah Kim | 18/29, 229 yards, TD, 2 INT |
| Eastern Michigan | Rushing | Dontae McMillan | 21 carries, 80 yards |
| Eastern Michigan | Receiving | Jamarien Wheeler | 6 receptions, 131 yards, TD |
| Ball State | Passing | Kiael Kelly | 13/22, 62 yards, INT |
| Ball State | Rushing | Kiael Kelly | 15 carries, 67 yards |
| Ball State | Receiving | Qian Magwood | 1 reception, 19 yards |

=== at Toledo ===
Ball State Cardinals (4–6) at Toledo Rockets (6–4) – Game summary

| Quarter | 1 | 2 | 3 | 4 | Total |
|---|---|---|---|---|---|
| Cardinals | 0 | 3 | 0 | 6 | 9 |
| Rockets | 14 | 10 | 7 | 7 | 38 |

at Glass Bowl • Toledo, Ohio

- Date: November 22
- Game time: 2:00 p.m. EDT
- Game attendance: 15,127
- Referee: Chris LaMange
- TV announcers (ESPN+): Kelsie Kasper (play-by-play) and Marcus Ray (analyst)

Game information

First quarter

- TOL – Trayvon Rudolph 14-yard pass from Tucker Gleason (Dylan Cunanan kick), 10:46. Rockets 7–0. Drive: 2 plays, 17 yards, 0:35.
- TOL – Ryder Treadway 24-yard pass from Tucker Gleason (Dylan Cunanan kick), 7:51. Rockets 14–0. Drive: 4 plays, 52 yards, 1:09.

Second quarter

- BALL – DC Pippin 47-yard field goal, 3:26. Rockets 14–3. Drive: 9 plays, 53 yards, 4:21.
- TOL – Chip Trayanum 2-yard run (Dylan Cunanan kick), 1:53. Rockets 21–3. Drive: 5 plays, 73 yards, 1:29.
- TOL – Dylan Cunanan 46-yard field goal, 0:00. Rockets 24–3. Drive: 5 plays, 22 yards, 0:21.

Third quarter

- TOL – Junior Vandeross III 42-yard pass from Tucker Gleason (Dylan Cunanan kick), 10:18. Rockets 31–3. Drive: 3 plays, 65 yards, 1:02.

Fourth quarter

- TOL – Junior Vandeross III 63-yard pass from Tucker Gleason (Dylan Cunanan kick), 12:05. Rockets 38–3. Drive: 6 plays, 84 yards, 2:42.
- BALL – Isaiah Thacker 15-yard pass from Kiael Kelly (DC Pippin kick failed), 3:43. Rockets 38–9. Drive: 10 plays, 91 yards, 4:50.

| Statistics | BALL | TOL |
|---|---|---|
| First downs | 18 | 19 |
| Plays–yards | 79–335 | 57–404 |
| Rushes–yards | 46–106 | 30–186 |
| Passing yards | 229 | 218 |
| Passing: Comp–Att–Int | 15–33–2 | 15–27–2 |
| Turnovers | 3 | 2 |
| Time of possession | 37:04 | 22:56 |

| Team | Category | Player | Statistics |
|---|---|---|---|
| Ball State | Passing | Kiael Kelly | 14/31, 189 yards, TD, 2 INT |
| Ball State | Rushing | Jalen Bonds | 16 carries, 58 yards |
| Ball State | Receiving | Jalen Bonds | 1 reception, 54 yards |
| Toledo | Passing | Tucker Gleason | 15/24, 218 yards, 4 TD, 2 INT |
| Toledo | Rushing | Chip Trayanum | 15 carries, 128 yards, TD |
| Toledo | Receiving | Junior Vandeross III | 7 receptions, 127 yards, 2 TD |

=== at Miami (OH) ===
Ball State Cardinals (4–7) at Miami RedHawks (6–5) – Game summary

| Quarter | 1 | 2 | 3 | 4 | Total |
|---|---|---|---|---|---|
| Cardinals | 10 | 0 | 0 | 14 | 24 |
| RedHawks | 21 | 10 | 7 | 7 | 45 |

at Yager Stadium • Oxford, Ohio

- Date: November 29
- Game weather: Cloudy
- Game attendance: 11,137
- Referee: Marcel Kerr
- TV announcers (CBSSN): Fran Charles (play-by-play) and Taylor McHargue (analyst)

Game information

First quarter

- (9:07) M-OH – Braylon Isom 23-yard pass from Thomas Gotkowski, Dom Dzioban kick (Drive: 7 plays, 52 yards, 2:58; Miami (OH) 7-0)
- (8:12) BALL – Jalen Bonds 2-yard run, DC Pippin kick (Drive: 3 plays, 65 yards, 0:55; 7-7)
- (6:26) M-OH – Braylon Isom 10-yard pass from Thomas Gotkowski, Dom Dzioban kick (Drive: 5 plays, 69 yards, 1:39; Miami (OH) 14-7)
- (2:30) BALL – DC Pippin 43-yard field goal (Drive: 7 plays, 53 yards, 3:49; Miami (OH) 14-10)
- (0:21) M-OH – Jordan Brunson 12-yard run, Dom Dzioban kick (Drive: 4 plays, 63 yards, 2:00; Miami (OH) 21-10)

Second quarter

- (10:09) M-OH – Kam Perry 55-yard pass from Thomas Gotkowski, Dom Dzioban kick (Drive: 1 play, 55 yards, 0:08; Miami (OH) 28-10)
- (0:14) M-OH – Dom Dzioban 33-yard field goal (Drive: 11 plays, 41 yards, 3:20; Miami (OH) 31-10)

Third quarter

- (7:34) M-OH – D'Shawntae Jones 1-yard run, Dom Dzioban kick (Drive: 8 plays, 60 yards, 5:05; Miami (OH) 38-10)

Fourth quarter

- (7:44) BALL – Qua Ashley 2-yard pass from Kiael Kelly, DC Pippin kick (Drive: 13 plays, 74 yards, 5:13; Miami (OH) 38-17)
- (2:11) M-OH – Jermaine Agee 0-yard fumble recovery, Kellan McLaughlin kick (Drive: 2 plays, -14 yards, 0:28; Miami (OH) 45-17)
- (1:16) BALL – Eric Weatherly 35-yard pass from Kiael Kelly, DC Pippin kick (Drive: 6 plays, 75 yards, 0:55; Miami (OH) 45-25)

| Statistics | BALL | M-OH |
|---|---|---|
| First downs | 15 | 23 |
| Plays–yards | 59–280 | 66–458 |
| Rushes–yards | 36–103 | 42–232 |
| Passing yards | 177 | 226 |
| Passing: Comp–Att–Int | 14-23-0 | 12-24-0 |
| Turnovers | 1 | 0 |
| Time of possession | 27:26 | 32:34 |

| Team | Category | Player | Statistics |
|---|---|---|---|
| Ball State | Passing | Kiael Kelly | 14/23, 177 yards, 2 TD |
| Ball State | Rushing | Kiael Kelly | 16 carries, 61 yards |
| Ball State | Receiving | Donovan Hamilton | 4 receptions, 72 yards |
| Miami (OH) | Passing | Thomas Gotkowski | 12/24, 226 yards, 3 TD |
| Miami (OH) | Rushing | Jordan Brunson | 14 carries, 54 yards, TD |
| Miami (OH) | Receiving | Cole Weaver | 5 receptions, 66 yards |
