= 2025 Auburn Tigers football team =

American college football season

2025 Auburn Tigers football
- Conference: Southeastern Conference
- Record: 5–7 (1–7 SEC)
- Head coach: Hugh Freeze (3rd season; first 9 games); D. J. Durkin (interim; remainder of season)
- Offensive coordinator: Derrick Nix (2nd season)
- Offensive scheme: Multiple
- Defensive coordinator: D. J. Durkin (2nd season)
- Base defense: Multiple
- Home stadium: Jordan–Hare Stadium

2025 Southeastern Conference football standings
	Conf.			Overall
Team	W		L	W		L
No. 9 Alabama y^	7	–	1	11	–	4
No. 6 Georgia y$^	7	–	1	12	–	2
No. 3 Ole Miss ^	7	–	1	13	–	2
No. 8 Texas A&M ^	7	–	1	11	–	2
No. 13 Oklahoma ^	6	–	2	10	–	3
No. 12 Texas	6	–	2	10	–	3
No. 15 Vanderbilt	6	–	2	10	–	3
Missouri	4	–	4	8	–	5
Tennessee	4	–	4	8	–	5
LSU	3	–	5	7	–	6
Kentucky	2	–	6	5	–	7
Florida	2	–	6	4	–	8
Auburn	1	–	7	5	–	7
Mississippi State	1	–	7	5	–	8
South Carolina	1	–	7	4	–	8
Arkansas	0	–	8	2	–	10
Championship: Georgia 28, Alabama 7
^ – College Football Playoff participant; $ – Conference champion; y – Championship game participant; Rankings from AP Poll

The 2025 Auburn Tigers football team represented Auburn University as a member of the Southeastern Conference (SEC) during the 2025 NCAA Division I FBS football season. The Tigers played home games at Jordan–Hare Stadium located in Auburn, Alabama.

The Tigers were led by third-year head coach Hugh Freeze for the first nine games of the season. Freeze was fired on November 2 following a loss to Kentucky, finishing his tenure at Auburn with an overall record of 15–19. Defensive coordinator D. J. Durkin was named interim coach for the rest of the season. On November 30, South Florida head coach Alex Golesh was hired as the Tigers' new head coach.

The Auburn Tigers drew an average home attendance of 88,043, the 11th-highest of all college football teams.

== Schedule ==
Date	Time	Opponent	Rank	Site	TV	Result	Attendance
August 29	7:00 p.m.	at Baylor*		McLane Stadium; Waco, TX	FOX	W 38–24	45,233
September 6	6:30 p.m.	Ball State*		Jordan–Hare Stadium; Auburn, AL	ESPNU	W 42–3	88,043
September 13	11:45 a.m.	South Alabama*^{†}	No. 24	Jordan–Hare Stadium; Auburn, AL	SECN	W 31–15	88,043
September 20	2:30 p.m.	at No. 11 Oklahoma	No. 22	Gaylord Family Oklahoma Memorial Stadium; Norman, OK (SEC Nation)	ABC	L 17–24	83,639
September 27	2:30 p.m.	at No. 9 Texas A&M		Kyle Field; College Station, TX	ESPN	L 10–16	108,449
October 11	6:30 p.m.	No. 10 Georgia		Jordan-Hare Stadium; Auburn, AL (Deep South's Oldest Rivalry)	ABC	L 10–20	88,043
October 18	6:45 p.m.	No. 16 Missouri		Jordan–Hare Stadium; Auburn, AL	SECN	L 17–23 ^{2OT}	87,798
October 25	11:45 a.m.	at Arkansas		Donald W. Reynolds Razorback Stadium; Fayetteville, AR	SECN	W 33–24	68,922
November 1	6:30 p.m.	Kentucky		Jordan–Hare Stadium; Auburn, AL	SECN	L 3–10	88,043
November 8	3:00 p.m.	at No. 16 Vanderbilt		FirstBank Stadium; Nashville, TN	SECN	L 38–45 ^{OT}	35,000
November 22	1:00 p.m.	No. 7 (FCS) Mercer*		Jordan–Hare Stadium; Auburn, AL	SECN+/ESPN+	W 62–17	88,043
November 29	6:30 p.m.	No. 10 Alabama		Jordan–Hare Stadium; Auburn, AL (Iron Bowl)	ABC/SECN	L 20–27	88,043
*Non-conference game; ^{†}Homecoming; Rankings from AP Poll (and CFP Rankings, after November 4) - Released prior to game; All times are in Central time

== Game summaries ==
=== at Baylor ===
Auburn Tigers (0–0) at Baylor Bears (0–0) – Game summary

Quarter	1	2	3	4	Total
Tigers	7	10	14	7	38
Bears	3	7	7	7	24

at McLane Stadium • Waco, Texas

- Date: August 29
- Game time: 7:06 p.m. CDT
- Game weather: Clear • Temperature: 90 °F (32 °C) • Wind: NE 8 mph
- Game attendance: 45,233
- Referee: Jason Autrey
- TV announcers (FOX): Jason Benetti (play-by-play), Robert Griffin III (analyst), and Alexa Landestoy (sideline reporter)
- Recap

Game information

First quarter

- BAY – Connor Hawkins 36-yard field goal, 10:36. Baylor 3–0. Drive: 13 plays, 56 yards, 4:24.
- AUB – Jackson Arnold 24-yard run (Alex McPherson kick), 0:34. Auburn 7–3. Drive: 12 plays, 96 yards, 5:53.

Second quarter

- AUB – Damari Alston 9-yard run (Alex McPherson kick), 10:29. Auburn 14–3. Drive: 7 plays, 65 yards, 3:45.
- AUB – Alex McPherson 21-yard field goal, 5:45. Auburn 17–3. Drive: 7 plays, 41 yards, 2:58.
- BAY – Kobe Prentice 33-yard pass from Sawyer Robertson (Connor Hawkins kick), 3:21. Auburn 17–10. Drive: 8 plays, 75 yards, 2:24.

Third quarter

- AUB – Jeremiah Cobb 2-yard run (Alex McPherson kick), 5:40. Auburn 24–10. Drive: 9 plays, 71 yards, 4:12.
- BAY – Caden Knighten 4-yard pass from Sawyer Robertson (Connor Hawkins kick), 0:58. Auburn 24–17. Drive: 10 plays, 75 yards, 4:42.
- AUB – Rayshawn Pleasant 98-yard kickoff return (Alex McPherson kick), 0:43. Auburn 31–17.

Fourth quarter

- BAY – Michael Trigg 4-yard pass from Sawyer Robertson (Connor Hawkins kick), 11:48. Auburn 31–24. Drive: 9 plays, 79 yards, 3:49.
- AUB – Jackson Arnold 27-yard run (Alex McPherson kick), 4:32. Auburn 38–24. Drive: 12 plays, 75 yards, 7:16.

Statistics	AUB	BAY
First downs	25	23
Plays–yards	69–415	72–483
Rushes–yards	52–307	24–64
Passing yards	108	419
Passing: comp–att–int	11–17–0	27–48–0
Turnovers	0	0
Time of possession	33:03	26:57

Team	Category	Player	Statistics
Auburn	Passing	Jackson Arnold	11/17, 108 yards
Auburn	Rushing	Jackson Arnold	16 carries, 137 yards, 2 TD
Auburn	Receiving	Eric Singleton Jr.	3 receptions, 20 yards
Baylor	Passing	Sawyer Robertson	27/48, 419 yards, 3 TD
Baylor	Rushing	Bryson Washington	14 carries, 54 yards
Baylor	Receiving	Kole Wilson	8 receptions, 134 yards

=== vs Ball State ===
Ball State Cardinals (0–1) at Auburn Tigers (1–0) – Game summary

Quarter	1	2	3	4	Total
Cardinals	0	0	3	0	3
Tigers	14	7	7	14	42

at Jordan-Hare Stadium • Auburn, Alabama

- Date: September 6
- Game time: 6:35 p.m. CDT
- Game weather: Cloudy • Temperature: 80 °F (27 °C)
- Game attendance: 88,043
- Referee: Matt Loeffler
- TV announcers (ESPNU): Lowell Galindo (play-by-play), Aaron Murray (analyst), and Lauren Sisler (sideline reporter)
- Recap

Game information

First quarter

- AUB – Jeremiah Cobb 46-yard run (Alex McPherson kick), 4:15. Auburn 7–0. Drive: 2 plays, 55 yards, 0:42.
- AUB – Eric Singleton Jr. 30-yard pass from Jackson Arnold (Alex McPherson kick), 0:44. Auburn 14–0. Drive: 3 plays, 50 yards, 1:11.

Second quarter

- AUB – Horatio Fields 11-yard pass from Jackson Arnold (Alex McPherson kick), 0:37. Auburn 21–0. Drive: 9 plays, 67 yards, 3:14.

Third quarter

- AUB – Jeremiah Cobb 45-yard run (Alex McPherson kick), 7:32. Auburn 28–0. Drive: 4 plays, 79 yards, 1:40.
- BSU – Carson Holmer 22-yard field goal, 1:04. Auburn 28–3. Drive: 7 plays, 19 yards, 3:50.

Fourth quarter

- AUB – Eric Singleton Jr. 13-yard pass from Jackson Arnold (Alex McPherson kick), 12:22. Auburn 35–3. Drive: 9 plays, 72 yards, 3:36.
- AUB – Durell Robinson 54-yard run (Alex McPherson kick), 5:13. Auburn 42–3. Drive: 1 play, 54 yards, 0:10.

Statistics	BSU	AUB
First downs	6	27
Plays–yards	49–68	67–495
Rushes–yards	33–-3	34–224
Passing yards	71	271
Passing: comp–att–int	10–16–0	26–33–0
Turnovers	1	1
Time of possession	30:15	29:45

Team	Category	Player	Statistics
Ball State	Passing	Kiael Kelly	10/16, 71 yards
Ball State	Rushing	Qua Ashley	12 carries, 10 yards
Ball State	Receiving	Eric Weatherly	5 receptions, 42 yards
Auburn	Passing	Jackson Arnold	24/28, 251 yards, 3 TD
Auburn	Rushing	Jeremiah Cobb	11 carries, 121 yards, 2 TD
Auburn	Receiving	Cam Coleman	7 receptions, 77 yards

=== vs South Alabama ===
South Alabama Jaguars (1–1) at No. 24 Auburn Tigers (2–0) – Game summary

Quarter	1	2	3	4	Total
Jaguars	3	6	6	0	15
No. 24 Tigers	7	21	3	0	31

at Jordan-Hare Stadium • Auburn, Alabama

- Date: September 13
- Game time: 11:47 a.m. CDT
- Game weather: Sunny • Temperature: 82 °F (28 °C)
- Game attendance: 88,043
- Referee: James Carter
- TV announcers (SECN): Taylor Zarzour (play-by-play), Matt Stinchcomb (analyst), and Alyssa Lang (sideline reporter)
- Recap

Game information

First quarter

- AUB – Cam Coleman 32-yard pass from Jackson Arnold (Alex McPherson kick), 9:09. Auburn 7–0. Drive: 12 plays, 92 yards, 5:51.
- USA – Hamilton DiBoyan 29-yard field goal, 3:43. Auburn 7–3. Drive: 12 plays, 64 yards, 5:26.

Second quarter

- AUB – Jackson Arnold 6-yard run (Alex McPherson kick), 14:14. Auburn 14–3. Drive: 5 plays, 33 yards, 1:30.
- AUB – Jackson Arnold 5-yard run (Alex McPherson kick), 9:48. Auburn 21–3. Drive: 7 plays, 54 yards, 2:36.
- USA – Jeremy Scott 32-yard pass from Bishop Davenport (Hamilton DiBoyan kick failed), 5:24. Auburn 21–9. Drive: 10 plays, 75 yards, 4:24.
- AUB – Jeremiah Cobb 2-yard run (Alex McPherson kick), 0:40. Auburn 28–9. Drive: 14 plays, 75 yards, 4:44.

Third quarter

- USA – Devin Voisin 12-yard pass from Bishop Davenport (Hamilton DiBoyan kick failed), 9:55. Auburn 28–15. Drive: 11 plays, 75 yards, 5:05.
- AUB – Alex McPherson 34-yard field goal, 1:15. Auburn 31–15. Drive: 16 plays, 62 yards, 8:34.

Fourth quarter

- No scoring plays.

Statistics	USA	AUB
First downs	21	19
Plays–yards	68–310	63–337
Rushes–yards	42–140	39–195
Passing yards	170	142
Passing: comp–att–int	18–26–1	13–24–0
Turnovers	2	0
Time of possession	31:27	28:33

Team	Category	Player	Statistics
South Alabama	Passing	Bishop Davenport	18/26, 170 yards, 2 TD, INT
South Alabama	Rushing	Kentrel Bullock	16 carries, 57 yards
South Alabama	Receiving	Anthony Eager	8 receptions, 55 yards
Auburn	Passing	Jackson Arnold	13/24, 142 yards, TD
Auburn	Rushing	Jeremiah Cobb	19 carries, 119 yards, TD
Auburn	Receiving	Eric Singleton Jr.	6 receptions, 65 yards

=== at No. 11 Oklahoma ===
No. 22 Auburn Tigers (3–0) at No. 11 Oklahoma Sooners (3–0) – Game summary

Quarter	1	2	3	4	Total
No. 22 Tigers	3	7	0	7	17
No. 11 Sooners	3	7	3	11	24

at Gaylord Family Oklahoma Memorial Stadium • Norman, Oklahoma

- Date: September 20
- Game time: 2:45 p.m. CDT
- Game weather: Sunny • Temperature: 89 °F (32 °C) • Wind: SW 12 mph
- Game attendance: 83,639
- Referee: Jeff Heaser
- TV announcers (ABC): Sean McDonough (play-by-play), Greg McElroy (analyst), and Molly McGrath (sideline reporter)
- Recap

Game information

First quarter

- OU – Tate Sandell 49-yard field goal, 8:32. Oklahoma 3–0. Drive: 12 plays, 39 yards, 4:29.
- AUB – Alex McPherson 24-yard field goal, 3:56. Tied 3–3. Drive: 10 plays, 87 yards, 4:31.

Second quarter

- OU – Isaiah Sategna III 24-yard pass from John Mateer (Tate Sandell kick), 10:45. Oklahoma 10–3. Drive: 2 plays, 12 yards, 0:50.
- AUB – Cam Coleman 2-yard pass from Jackson Arnold (Alex McPherson kick), 1:08. Tied 10–10. Drive: 8 plays, 60 yards, 3:17.

Third quarter

- OU – Tate Sandell 32-yard field goal, 8:36. Oklahoma 13–10. Drive: 11 plays, 46 yards, 4:21.

Fourth quarter

- OU – Tate Sandell 28-yard field goal, 14:56. Oklahoma 16–10. Drive: 8 plays, 58 yards, 3:09.
- AUB – Malcolm Simmons 4-yard run (Alex McPherson kick), 7:08. Auburn 17–16. Drive: 14 plays, 75 yards, 7:48.
- OU – John Mateer 9-yard run (2-pt conversion failed), 4:54. Oklahoma 22–17. Drive: 6 plays, 75 yards, 2:14.
- OU – R Mason Thomas safety, 1:06. Oklahoma 24–17.

Statistics	AUB	OU
First downs	18	16
Plays–yards	69–287	62–303
Rushes–yards	36–67	26–32
Passing yards	220	271
Passing: comp–att–int	21–33–0	24–36–0
Turnovers	0	1
Time of possession	35:34	24:26

Team	Category	Player	Statistics
Auburn	Passing	Jackson Arnold	21/32, 220 yards, TD
Auburn	Rushing	Jeremiah Cobb	6 carries, 61 yards
Auburn	Receiving	Eric Singleton Jr.	9 receptions, 60 yards
Oklahoma	Passing	John Mateer	24/36, 271 yards, TD
Oklahoma	Rushing	John Mateer	10 carries, 29 yards, TD
Oklahoma	Receiving	Isaiah Sategna III	9 receptions, 127 yards, TD

=== at No. 9 Texas A&M ===
Auburn Tigers (3–1) at No. 9 Texas A&M Aggies (3–0) – Game summary

Quarter	1	2	3	4	Total
Tigers	0	3	0	7	10
No. 9 Aggies	7	6	0	3	16

at Kyle Field • College Station, Texas

- Date: September 27
- Game time: 2:40 p.m. CDT
- Game weather: Sunny • Temperature: 88 °F (31 °C) • Wind: NE 7 mph
- Game attendance: 108,449
- Referee: Daniel Gautreaux
- TV announcers (ESPN): Joe Tessitore (play-by-play), Jesse Palmer (analyst), and Katie George (sideline reporter)
- Recap

Game information

First quarter

- TA&M – Le'Veon Moss 4-yard run (Randy Bond kick), 12:14. Texas A&M 7–0. Drive: 4 plays, 66 yards, 1:41.

Second quarter

- AUB – Alex McPherson 32-yard field goal, 10:50. Texas A&M 7–3. Drive: 8 plays, 57 yards, 2:38.
- TA&M – Randy Bond 33-yard field goal, 6:49. Texas A&M 10–3. Drive: 9 plays, 60 yards, 4:01.
- TA&M – Randy Bond 49-yard field goal, 1:45. Texas A&M 13–3. Drive: 8 plays, 25 yards, 2:53.

Third quarter

No scoring

Fourth quarter

- AUB – Jackson Arnold 2-yard run (Alex McPherson kick), 10:20. Texas A&M 13–10. Drive: 1 play, 2 yards, 0:17.
- TA&M – Randy Bond 44-yard field goal, 2:42. Texas A&M 16–10. Drive: 5 plays, 21 yards, 2:28.

Statistics	AUB	TA&M
First downs	9	21
Plays–yards	57–177	69–414
Rushes–yards	24–52	47–207
Passing yards	125	207
Passing: comp–att–int	18–33–0	15–22–1
Turnovers	0	1
Time of possession	25:54	34:06

Team	Category	Player	Statistics
Auburn	Passing	Jackson Arnold	18/33, 125 yards
Auburn	Rushing	Jeremiah Cobb	6 carries, 28 yards
Auburn	Receiving	Eric Singleton Jr.	5 receptions, 56 yards
Texas A&M	Passing	Marcel Reed	15/22, 207 yards, INT
Texas A&M	Rushing	Le'Veon Moss	21 carries, 139 yards, TD
Texas A&M	Receiving	KC Concepcion	7 receptions, 113 yards

=== vs No. 10 Georgia (Deep South's Oldest Rivalry) ===
No. 10 Georgia Bulldogs (4–1) at Auburn Tigers (3–2) – Game summary

Quarter	1	2	3	4	Total
No. 10 Bulldogs	0	3	10	7	20
Tigers	7	3	0	0	10

at Jordan-Hare Stadium • Auburn, Alabama

- Date: October 11
- Game time: 6:44 p.m. CDT
- Game weather: Clear • Temperature: 72 °F (22 °C)
- Game attendance: 88,043
- Referee: Ken Williamson
- TV announcers (ABC): Sean McDonough (play-by-play), Greg McElroy (analyst), and Molly McGrath (sideline reporter)
- Recap

Game information

First quarter

- AUB – Jackson Arnold 2-yard run (Alex McPherson kick), 7:39. Auburn 7–0. Drive: 14 plays, 75 yards, 7:21.

Second quarter

- AUB – Alex McPherson 25-yard field goal, 13:41. Auburn 10–0. Drive: 12 plays, 70 yards, 5:32.
- UGA – Peyton Woodring 29-yard field goal, 0:13. Auburn 10–3. Drive: 12 plays, 88 yards, 1:19.

Third quarter

- UGA – Chauncey Bowens 2-yard run (Peyton Woodring kick), 7:23. Tied 10–10. Drive: 5 plays, 63 yards, 1:47.
- UGA – Peyton Woodring 53-yard field goal, 1:22. Georgia 13–10. Drive: 9 plays, 25 yards, 4:21.

Fourth quarter

- UGA – Gunner Stockton 10-yard run (Peyton Woodring kick), 1:53. Georgia 20–10. Drive: 16 plays, 78 yards, 8:45.

Statistics	UGA	AUB
First downs	21	18
Plays–yards	69–296	67–277
Rushes–yards	31–79	36–140
Passing yards	217	137
Passing: comp–att–int	24–38–0	19–3–0
Turnovers	0	1
Time of possession	30:12	29:48

Team	Category	Player	Statistics
Georgia	Passing	Gunner Stockton	24/37, 217 yards
Georgia	Rushing	Gunner Stockton	9 carries, 26 yards, TD
Georgia	Receiving	Zachariah Branch	9 receptions, 57 yards
Auburn	Passing	Jackson Arnold	19/31, 137 yards
Auburn	Rushing	Jackson Arnold	13 carries, 55 yards, TD
Auburn	Receiving	Cam Coleman	7 receptions, 50 yards

=== vs No. 16 Missouri ===
No. 16 Missouri Tigers (5–1) at Auburn Tigers (3–3) – Game summary

Quarter	1	2	3	4	OT	2OT	Total
No. 16 Missouri Tigers	3	7	0	7	0	6	23
Auburn Tigers	7	0	7	3	0	0	17

at Jordan-Hare Stadium • Auburn, Alabama

- Date: October 18
- Game time: 6:55 p.m. CDT
- Game weather: Sunny • Temperature: 73 °F (23 °C) • Wind: SE 7 mph
- Game attendance: 88,043
- Referee: Kyle Olson
- TV announcers (SECN): Tom Hart (play-by-play), Jordan Rodgers (analyst), and Cole Cubelic (sideline reporter)
- Recap

Game information

First quarter

- AUB – Jackson Arnold 1-yard run (Alex McPherson kick), 9:54. Auburn 7–0. Drive: 12 plays, 75 yards, 5:06.
- MIZ – Robert Meyer 24–yard field goal, 1:44. Auburn 7–3. Drive: 10 plays, 24 yards, 5:05.

Second quarter

- MIZ – Ahmad Hardy 2-yard run (Robert Meyer kick), 10:21. Missouri 10–7. Drive: 9 plays, 65 yards, 4:48.

Third quarter

- AUB – Omar Mabson II 1-yard run (Alex McPherson kick), 0:35. Auburn 14–10. Drive: 12 plays, 86 yards, 4:58.

Fourth quarter

- AUB – Alex McPherson 22-yard field goal, 10:31. Auburn 17–10. Drive: 8 plays, 73 yards, 3:52.
- MIZ - Ahmad Hardy 3-yard run (Robert Meyer kick), 5:07. Tied 17–17. Drive: 5 plays, 60 yards, 1:09.

First overtime

- No scoring plays.

Second overtime

- MIZ – Beau Pribula 3-yard run (Kevin Coleman Jr. pass from Beau Pribula failed). Missouri 23–17. Drive: 7 plays, 25 yards.

Statistics	MIZ	AUB
First downs	26	19
Plays–yards	84–343	71–347
Rushes–yards	44–91	41–150
Passing yards	252	207
Passing: comp–att–int	23–40–2	18–30–1
Turnovers	2	1
Time of possession	32:47	27:13

Team	Category	Player	Statistics
Missouri	Passing	Beau Pribula	23/40, 252 yards, 2 INT
Missouri	Rushing	Ahmad Hardy	24 carries, 58 yards, 2 TD
Missouri	Receiving	Donovan Olugbode	5 receptions, 69 yards
Auburn	Passing	Jackson Arnold	18/30, 207 yards, INT
Auburn	Rushing	Jeremiah Cobb	19 carries, 111 yards
Auburn	Receiving	Cam Coleman	6 receptions, 108 yards

=== at Arkansas ===
Auburn Tigers (3–4) at Arkansas Razorbacks (2–5) – Game summary

Quarter	1	2	3	4	Total
Tigers	7	3	6	17	33
Razorbacks	0	21	3	0	24

at Donald W. Reynolds Razorback Stadium • Fayetteville, Arkansas

- Date: October 25
- Game time: 11:47 a.m. CDT
- Game weather: Rain • Temperature: 59 °F (15 °C) • Wind: W 9 mph
- Game attendance: 68,922
- Referee: Lee Hedrick
- TV announcers (SECN): Dave Neal (play-by-play), Fozzy Whittaker (analyst), and Morgan Uber (sideline reporter)
- Recap

Game information

First quarter

- AUB – Cam Coleman 23-yard pass from Jackson Arnold (Alex McPherson kick), 7:52. Auburn 7–0. Drive: 9 plays, 67 yards, 4:42.

Second quarter

- AUB – Alex McPherson 36-yard field goal, 12:05. Auburn 10–0. Drive: 15 plays, 76 yards, 7:46.
- ARK – Raylen Sharpe 58-yard pass from Taylen Green (Scott Starzyk kick), 8:36. Auburn 10–7. Drive: 6 plays, 83 yards, 3:22.
- ARK – Braylen Russell 2-yard run (Scott Starzyk kick), 5:24. Arkansas 14–10. Drive: 4 plays, 48 yards, 2:09.
- ARK – Kani Walker 89-yard interception return (Scott Starzyk kick), 0:48. Arkansas 21–10.

Third quarter

- AUB – Alex McPherson 23-yard field goal, 10:21. Arkansas 21–13. Drive: 9 plays, 46 yards, 4:30.
- AUB – Alex McPherson 43-yard field goal, 5:05. Arkansas 21–16. Drive: 6 plays, 18 yards, 3:50.
- ARK – Scott Starzyk 27-yard field goal, 0:57. Arkansas 24–16. Drive: 9 plays, 66 yards, 4:08.

Fourth quarter

- AUB – Alex McPherson 26-yard field goal, 12:03. Arkansas 24–19. Drive: 8 plays, 73 yards, 3:49.
- AUB – Rayshawn Pleasant 49-yard interception return (Ashton Daniels run), 9:15. Auburn 27–24.
- AUB – Alex McPherson 47-yard field goal, 6:23. Auburn 30–24. Drive: 4 plays, 5 yards, 2:10.
- AUB – Alex McPherson 37-yard field goal, 1:06. Auburn 33–24. Drive: 8 plays, 19 yards, 3:21.

Statistics	AUB	ARK
First downs	21	14
Plays–yards	70–380	45–331
Rushes–yards	50–230	23–63
Passing yards	150	268
Passing: comp–att–int	13–20–1	14–22–3
Turnovers	1	4
Time of possession	37:40	22:20

Team	Category	Player	Statistics
Auburn	Passing	Jackson Arnold	7/12, 73 yards, TD, INT
Auburn	Rushing	Jeremiah Cobb	28 carries, 153 yards
Auburn	Receiving	Malcolm Simmons	3 receptions, 17 yards
Arkansas	Passing	Taylen Green	14/22, 268 yards, TD, 3 INT
Arkansas	Rushing	Mike Washington Jr.	12 carries, 41 yards
Arkansas	Receiving	O'Mega Blake	6 receptions, 61 yards

=== vs Kentucky ===
Kentucky Wildcats (2–5) at Auburn Tigers (4–4) – Game summary

Quarter	1	2	3	4	Total
Wildcats	0	3	7	0	10
Tigers	0	3	0	0	3

at Jordan-Hare Stadium • Auburn, Alabama

- Date: November 1
- Game time: 6:40 p.m. CDT
- Game weather:
- Game attendance:
- Referee: David Smith
- TV announcers (SECN): Tom Hart (play-by-play), Cole Cubelic (analyst), and Alyssa Lang (sideline reporter)

Game information

First quarter

- No scoring plays.

Second quarter

- UK – Jacob Kauwe 48-yard field goal, 11:40. Kentucky 3–0. Drive: 9 plays, 44 yards, 4:10.
- AUB – Alex McPherson 27-yard field goal, 0:02. Tied 3–3. Drive: 7 plays, 26 yards, 0:58.

Third quarter

- UK – Kendrick Law 13-yard pass from Cutter Boley (Jacob Kauwe kick), 9:27. Kentucky 10–3. Drive: 10 plays, 75 yards, 5:33.

Fourth quarter

- No scoring plays.

Statistics	UK	AUB
First downs	16	17
Plays–yards	61–240	71–241
Rushes–yards	32–79	40–118
Passing yards	161	123
Passing: comp–att–int	18–29–2	15–31–1
Turnovers	2	2
Time of possession	31:46	28:14

Team	Category	Player	Statistics
Kentucky	Passing	Cutter Boley	18/29, 161 yards, TD, 2 INT
Kentucky	Rushing	Seth McGowan	21 carries, 53 yards
Kentucky	Receiving	Kendrick Law	6 receptions, 49 yards, TD
Auburn	Passing	Ashton Daniels	13/28, 108 yards, INT
Auburn	Rushing	Jeremiah Cobb	20 carries, 72 yards
Auburn	Receiving	Cam Coleman	5 receptions, 34 yards

=== at No. 16 Vanderbilt ===
Auburn Tigers (4–5) at No. 16 Vanderbilt Commodores (7–2) – Game summary

Quarter	1	2	3	4	OT	Total
Tigers	7	13	10	8	0	38
No. 16 Commodores	0	10	14	14	7	45

at FirstBank Stadium • Nashville, Tennessee

- Date: November 8
- Game time: 3:00 p.m. CST
- Game weather:
- Game attendance: 35,000
- Referee: Kyle Olson
- TV announcers (SECN): Taylor Zarzour (play-by-play), Matt Stinchcomb (analyst), and Tori Petry (sideline reporter)

Game information

First quarter

- AUB – Eric Singleton Jr. 14-yard pass from Ashton Daniels (Alex McPherson kick), 5:45. Tigers 7–0. Drive: 13 plays, 89 yards, 5:30.

Second quarter

- VAN – Brock Taylor 23-yard field goal, 13:30. Tigers 7–3. Drive: 13 plays, 70 yards, 7:15.
- AUB – Ashton Daniels 11-yard run (Alex McPherson kick), 10:44. Tigers 14–3. Drive: 7 plays, 75 yards, 2:46.
- AUB – Alex McPherson 26-yard field goal, 1:52. Tigers 17–3. Drive: 10 plays, 57 yards, 4:13.
- VAN – Junior Sherrill 20-yard pass from Diego Pavia (Brock Taylor kick), 1:15. Tigers 17–10. Drive: 3 plays, 75 yards, 0:37.
- AUB – Alex McPherson 47-yard field goal, 0:00. Tigers 20–10. Drive: 10 plays, 46 yards, 1:15.

Third quarter

- VAN – Sedrick Alexander 4-yard run (Brock Taylor kick), 11:24. Tigers 20–17. Drive: 6 plays, 73 yards, 1:41.
- AUB – Alex McPherson 38-yard field goal, 9:15. Tigers 23–17. Drive: 8 plays, 55 yards, 2:09.
- VAN – Tre Richardson 57-yard pass from Diego Pavia (Brock Taylor kick), 7:37. Commodores 24–23. Drive: 4 plays, 75 yards, 1:38.
- AUB – Ashton Daniels 16-yard run (Alex McPherson kick), 1:11. Tigers 30–24. Drive: 7 plays, 65 yards, 3:43.

Fourth quarter

- VAN – Diego Pavia 7-yard run (Brock Taylor kick), 14:07. Commodores 31–30. Drive: 5 plays, 75 yards, 2:04.
- VAN – Sedrick Alexander 9-yard run (Brock Taylor kick), 7:57. Commodores 38–30. Drive: 10 plays, 68 yards, 4:04.
- AUB – Cam Coleman 23-yard pass from Ashton Daniels (Ashton Daniels–Cam Coleman pass), 5:27. Tied 38–38. Drive: 6 plays, 75 yards, 2:30.

Overtime

- VAN – Cole Spence 4-yard pass from Diego Pavia (Brock Taylor kick). Commodores 45–38. Drive: 3 plays, 25 yards.

Statistics	AUB	VAN
First downs	34	30
Plays–yards	82-563	69-544
Rushes–yards	36-210	36-167
Passing yards	353	377
Passing: comp–att–int	31-46-0	25-33-0
Turnovers	0	1
Time of possession	29:00	31:00

Team	Category	Player	Statistics
Auburn	Passing	Ashton Daniels	31/44, 353 yards, 2 TD
Auburn	Rushing	Jeremiah Cobb	16 carries, 115 yards
Auburn	Receiving	Cam Coleman	10 receptions, 143 yards, TD
Vanderbilt	Passing	Diego Pavia	25/33, 377 yards, 3 TD
Vanderbilt	Rushing	Diego Pavia	18 carries, 112 yards, TD
Vanderbilt	Receiving	Tre Richardson	3 receptions, 124 yards, TD

=== vs No. 7 (FCS) Mercer ===
No. 7 (FCS) Mercer Bears (9–1) at Auburn Tigers (4–6) – Game summary

Quarter	1	2	3	4	Total
No. 7 (FCS) Bears	14	3	0	0	17
Tigers	14	21	14	13	62

at Jordan-Hare Stadium • Auburn, Alabama

- Date: November 22
- Game time: 1:02 p.m. CST
- Game weather: Cloudy • Temperature: 75 °F (24 °C) • Wind: W 9 mph
- Game attendance: 88,043
- Referee: James Carter
- TV announcers (SECN+/ESPN+): Richard Cross (play-by-play) and Charles Arbuckle (analyst)

Game information

First quarter

- AUB – Deuce Knight 75-yard run (Alex McPherson kick), 14:45. Tigers 7–0. Drive: 1 play, 75 yards, 0:15.
- MER – CJ Miller 1-yard run (Reice Griffith kick), 10:52. Tied 7–7. Drive: 8 plays, 75 yards, 3:53.
- MER – Adjatay Dabbs 8-yard pass from Braden Atkinson (Reice Griffith kick), 2:59. Bears 14–7. Drive: 13 plays, 70 yards, 6:08.
- AUB – Deuce Knight 51-yard run (Alex McPherson kick), 0:28. Tied 14–14. Drive: 8 plays, 75 yards, 2:31.

Second quarter

- AUB – Deuce Knight 9-yard run (Alex McPherson kick), 8:00. Tigers 21–14. Drive: 10 plays, 80 yards, 3:53.
- MER – Reice Griffith 41-yard field goal, 4:09. Tigers 21–17. Drive: 10 plays, 51 yards, 3:51.
- AUB – Deuce Knight 20-yard run (Alex McPherson kick), 1:15. Tigers 28–17. Drive: 9 plays, 65 yards, 2:54.
- AUB – Cam Coleman 10-yard pass from Deuce Knight (Alex McPherson kick), 0:03. Tigers 35–17. Drive: 4 plays, 33 yards, 0:25.

Third quarter

- AUB – Elijah Menendez 41-yard interception return (Alex McPherson kick), 11:46. Tigers 42–17.
- AUB – Malcolm Simmons 91-yard pass from Deuce Knight (Alex McPherson kick), 8:08. Tigers 49–17. Drive: 1 play, 91 yards, 0:15.

Fourth quarter

- AUB – Alex McPherson 47-yard field goal, 12:03. Tigers 52–17. Drive: 7 plays, 19 yards, 3:28.
- AUB – Alex McPherson 49-yard field goal, 8:24. Tigers 55–17. Drive: 4 plays, -12 yards, 2:16.
- AUB – Jackson Arnold 56-yard run (Alex McPherson kick), 5:11. Tigers 62–17. Drive: 3 plays, 67 yards, 1:35.

Statistics	MER	AUB
First downs	19	21
Plays–yards	77–338	56–547
Rushes–yards	41–115	31–277
Passing yards	223	270
Passing: comp–att–int	21–36–2	18–25–0
Turnovers	3	0
Time of possession	37:20	22:40

Team	Category	Player	Statistics
Mercer	Passing	Braden Atkinson	20/33, 210 yards, TD, 2 INT
Mercer	Rushing	CJ Miller	14 carries, 38 yards, TD
Mercer	Receiving	Adjatay Dabbs	6 receptions, 74 yards, TD
Auburn	Passing	Deuce Knight	15/20, 239 yards, 2 TD
Auburn	Rushing	Deuce Knight	9 carries, 162 yards, 4 TD
Auburn	Receiving	Malcolm Simmons	5 receptions, 149 yards, TD

=== vs No. 10 Alabama (Iron Bowl) ===
No. 10 Alabama Crimson Tide (9–2) at Auburn Tigers (5–6) – Game summary

Quarter	1	2	3	4	Total
No. 10 Crimson Tide	10	7	3	7	27
Tigers	0	6	7	7	20

at Jordan-Hare Stadium • Auburn, Alabama

- Date: November 29
- Game time: 6:49 p.m. CST
- Game weather:
- Game attendance: 88,043
- Referee: Matt Loeffler
- TV announcers (ABC): Chris Fowler (play-by-play), Kirk Herbstreit (analyst), and Holly Rowe (sideline reporter)

Game information

First quarter

- ALA - Conor Talty 45-yard field goal, 7:29. Crimson Tide 3-0. Drive: 10 plays, 27 yards, 4:19.
- ALA - Isaiah Horton 6-yard pass from Ty Simpson (Conor Talty kick), 1:14. Crimson Tide 10-0. Drive: 7 plays, 65 yards, 3:42.

Second quarter

- ALA - Isaiah Horton 3-yard pass from Ty Simpson (Conor Talty kick), 11:28. Crimson Tide 17-0. Drive: 6 plays, 64 yards, 3:03.
- AUB - Alex McPherson 26-yard field goal, 4:06. Crimson Tide 17-3. Drive: 10 plays, 43 yards, 4:19.
- AUB - Alex McPherson 43-yard field goal, 0:00. Crimson Tide 17-6. Drive: 10 plays, 48 yards, 2:40.

Third quarter

- AUB - Malcolm Simmons 64-yard pass from Ashton Daniels (Alex McPherson kick), 14:00. Crimson Tide 17-13. Drive: 4 plays, 76 yards, 0:52.
- ALA - Conor Talty 29-yard field goal, 7:31. Crimson Tide 20-13. Drive: 13 plays, 64 yards, 6:29.

Fourth quarter

- AUB - Jeremiah Cobb 2-yard run (Alex McPherson kick), 11:43. Tied 20-20. Drive: 6 plays, 88 yards, 2:31.
- ALA - Isaiah Horton 6-yard pass from Ty Simpson (Conor Talty kick), 3:50. Crimson Tide 27-20. Drive: 15 plays, 75 yards, 7:53.

Statistics	ALA	AUB
First downs	18	20
Plays–yards	75-280	77-411
Rushes–yards	38-158	36-152
Passing yards	122	259
Passing: comp–att–int	19-35-0	18-39-1
Turnovers	0	2
Time of possession	34:29	25:31

Team	Category	Player	Statistics
Alabama	Passing	Ty Simpson	19/35, 122 yards, 3 TD
Alabama	Rushing	Jam Miller	15 carries, 83 yards
Alabama	Receiving	Isaiah Horton	5 receptions, 35 yards, 3 TD
Auburn	Passing	Ashton Daniels	18/39, 259 yards, TD, INT
Auburn	Rushing	Ashton Daniels	23 carries, 108 yards
Auburn	Receiving	Malcolm Simmons	3 receptions, 143 yards, TD

== Rankings ==
Ranking movements Legend: ██ Increase in ranking ██ Decrease in ranking — = Not ranked RV = Received votes
	Week																
Poll	Pre	1	2	3	4	5	6	7	8	9	10	11	12	13	14	15	Final
AP	RV	RV	24	22	RV	—	RV	—	—	—	—	—	—	—	—	—	—
Coaches	RV	RV	RV	25	RV	RV	RV	—	—	—	—	—	—	—	—	—	—
CFP	Not released										—	—	—	—	—	—	Not released
