= Alex McPherson =

American football player (born 2003)

No. 38 – Auburn Tigers
- Position: Kicker
- Class: Redshirt Senior

Personal information
- Born: August 29, 2003 (age 23)
- Listed height: 5 ft 9 in (1.75 m)
- Listed weight: 165 lb (75 kg)

Career information
- High school: Fort Payne (Fort Payne, Alabama)
- College: Auburn (2022–present)
- Stats at ESPN

Alex McPherson (born August 29, 2003) is an American football kicker who plays for the Auburn Tigers.

== Early life ==
McPherson attended Fort Payne High School in Fort Payne, Alabama. On July 6, 2021 he committed to Auburn University. In October 2021, he broke the Alabama state field goal record for high school with a 61 yard field goal.

== College career ==
=== 2022 ===
McPherson was a redshirt freshman and played four games in 2022 following then-starting kicker Anders Carlson being ruled out for the season with an injury. He made his career debut against Texas A&M, where he attempted three field goals and scored two. His longest field goal of the season was a 51-yard field goal against Western Kentucky.

=== 2023 ===
McPherson played in every game during the 2023 season, without a single missed field goal or extra point. He was a semifinalist for the Lou Groza Award.

=== 2024 ===
Throughout the 2024 season, McPherson suffered from ulcerative colitis. He played one game, against the Kentucky Wildcats. In December of the same year, he had surgery to remove his large intestine.

=== 2025 ===
In the pre-season, head coach Hugh Freeze expressed positivity that McPherson would be prepared to play in the upcoming season, as he re-gained weight that he lost due to his illness. He was named to the 2025 Lou Groza Award watch list in August. In the first three games of the season, he scored fifteen of fifteen extra points, alongside two field goals. Against the Arkansas Razorbacks, he tied the school record with six made field goals. He finished the season with 20 made field goals.

=== 2026 ===
McPherson stated that he was back to full strength ahead of spring practice in 2026. On October 17th, 2026, McPherson kicked the game-winning 34-yard field goal against No. 1 Georgia to win, snapping a 9-year losing streak against the Bulldogs, and achieving the first Auburn win in Athens since 2005.

=== Career statistics ===
| Year | Team | GP | Field goals | | | | Extra points | | | Total points |
| Year | Team | GP | FGM | FGA | FG% | Lng | XPM | XPA | XP% | Total points |
|---|---|---|---|---|---|---|---|---|---|---|
| 2022 | Auburn | 4 | 6 | 7 | 85.7 | 51 | 9 | 9 | 100.0 | 27 |
| 2023 | Auburn | 13 | 13 | 13 | 100.0 | 53 | 40 | 40 | 100.0 | 79 |
| 2024 | Auburn | 1 | 1 | 2 | 50.0 | 27 | 3 | 3 | 100.0 | 6 |
| 2025 | Auburn | 12 | 20 | 23 | 87.0 | 49 | 35 | 35 | 100.0 | 95 |

== Personal life ==
McPherson's brother is Evan McPherson, a placekicker who plays for the Cincinnati Bengals.
