= Jackson Arnold (American football) =

American football player (born 2004)

- Arnold with UNLV in 2026

No. 11 – UNLV Rebels
- Position: Quarterback
- Class: Senior

Personal information
- Born: September 2, 2004 (age 22); Atlanta, Georgia, U.S.
- Listed height: 6 ft 1 in (1.85 m)
- Listed weight: 220 lb (100 kg)

Career information
- High school: John H. Guyer (Denton, Texas)
- College: Oklahoma (2023–2024); Auburn (2025); UNLV (2026–present)

Awards and highlights
- Gatorade Football Player of the Year (2022); Landry Award (2022)
- Stats at ESPN

Jackson Arnold (born September 2, 2004) is an American college football quarterback for the UNLV Rebels. He previously played for the Oklahoma Sooners and Auburn Tigers.

== Early life ==
Arnold was born in Atlanta, Georgia and moved to Denton, Texas when he was 10 and attended John H. Guyer High School. Arnold is half Croatian by descent on his maternal side of the family. As a freshman and sophomore he was mainly the backup to future Vanderbilt Commodores quarterback and tight end Eli Stowers. As a junior, Arnold passed for 3,921 yards 34 touchdowns and also rushed for 659 yards and 12 touchdowns. He was initially rated a four-star recruit and committed to play college football at Oklahoma from 25 scholarship offers.

Arnold participated in the finals of the 2022 Elite 11 quarterback competition and was named the tournament's MVP. Entering his senior year, he was re-rated a five-star recruit. At the conclusion of his senior year at Guyer, Arnold was named the 2022 winner of the Landry Award, given annually to the top high school football player in the Dallas-Fort Worth Metroplex. Arnold was named the Gatorade National Player of the Year following his senior season.

== College career ==
=== Oklahoma ===
Arnold joined the Oklahoma Sooners as an early enrollee in January 2023. He began the 2023 season as the primary backup behind Dillon Gabriel. Arnold made his college debut in the Sooners' season opener against Arkansas State, entering the game in the third quarter and completing all 11 of his pass attempts for 114 yards and one touchdown while rushing for 39 yards and one touchdown in a 73–0 win. After Gabriel transferred to Oregon in December 2023, Arnold was named the starting quarterback for Oklahoma's Alamo Bowl matchup against Arizona. Arnold completed 26 of 45 passes for 361 yards, two touchdowns, and three interceptions in a 38–24 loss. He appeared in seven games with one start, completing 44 of 69 passes for 563 yards, four touchdowns, and three interceptions while rushing for 116 yards and a touchdown.

Arnold was named the starting quarterback over true freshman Michael Hawkins Jr. entering the 2024 season. In the season opener against Temple, he completed 17 of 25 passes for 141 yards and four touchdowns. After wins over Houston and Tulane, Arnold faced No. 6 Tennessee in a matchup featured on College GameDay. He completed seven of 16 passes for 54 yards and an interception before being benched in favor of Hawkins in the loss. Arnold did not play in the next two games, which the Sooners split, before relieving Hawkins against South Carolina and leading Oklahoma to its only touchdown in a 35–9 loss. He returned to the starting role for the final six games of the season, going 2–4, but led the Sooners to a 24–3 upset victory over No. 7 Alabama, rushing for a season-high 131 yards on 25 carries. On the season, he appeared in 10 games with nine starts, completing 154 of 246 passes for 1,421 yards, 12 touchdowns, and three interceptions while rushing for 444 yards and three touchdowns. Oklahoma finished the regular season 6–6, and on December 4, Arnold announced that he would enter the NCAA transfer portal, opting out of the 2024 Armed Forces Bowl against Navy.

=== Auburn ===
On December 14, 2024, Auburn announced that they had signed Arnold. He was named the starting quarterback for the 2025 season over Stanford transfer Ashton Daniels and true freshman Deuce Knight. In the season opener against Baylor, Arnold led the Tigers to a 38–24 victory, rushing for 137 yards and two touchdowns while passing for 108 yards. He was named SEC Co-Offensive Player of the Week for his performance. The following week against Ball State, he completed 24 of 28 passes for 251 yards and three touchdowns in a 42–3 win. Against South Alabama in Week 3, he accounted for three touchdowns in a 31–15 win, helping Auburn enter the AP Poll at No. 22. In Week 4 against his former team, Oklahoma, Arnold completed 21 of 32 passes for 220 yards and a touchdown in a 24–17 loss. The loss began a four-game losing streak, after which Arnold was benched in favor of Daniels following an 89-yard pick-six against Arkansas. Arnold later saw action in two of the final four games, including a 56-yard touchdown run against Mercer in his final play as a Tiger. On the season, he appeared in 10 games with eight starts, completing 136 of 215 passes for 1,309 yards, six touchdowns, and two interceptions while rushing for 311 yards and eight touchdowns. On December 7, 2025, it was reported that Arnold would enter the transfer portal for the second time in his career.

=== UNLV ===
On January 7, 2026, Arnold transferred to UNLV. He was named the starting quarterback ahead of the 2026 season over Alex Orji. In the season opener against Memphis, Arnold completed 25 of 37 passes for 291 yards and two touchdowns while rushing for 54 yards and a touchdown on 21 carries in a 27–21 loss.

=== Statistics ===
Season	Team	Games			Passing								Rushing			
Season	Team	GP	GS	Record	Cmp	Att	Pct	Yds	Y/A	TD	Int	Rtg	Att	Yds	Avg	TD
2023	Oklahoma	7	1	0–1	44	69	63.8	563	8.2	4	3	142.7	31	116	3.7	1
2024	Oklahoma	10	9	5–4	154	246	62.6	1,421	5.8	12	3	124.8	150	444	3.0	3
2025	Auburn	10	8	4–4	136	215	63.3	1,309	6.1	6	2	121.7	112	311	2.8	8
2026	UNLV	8	8	5–3	128	212	60.4	1,655	7.8	13	4	142.4	118	494	4.2	6
Career		35	26	14–12	4262	742	62.3	4,948	6.7	35	12	130.6	411	1,365	3.3	18
