= Jeremiah Cobb =

American football player (born 2004)

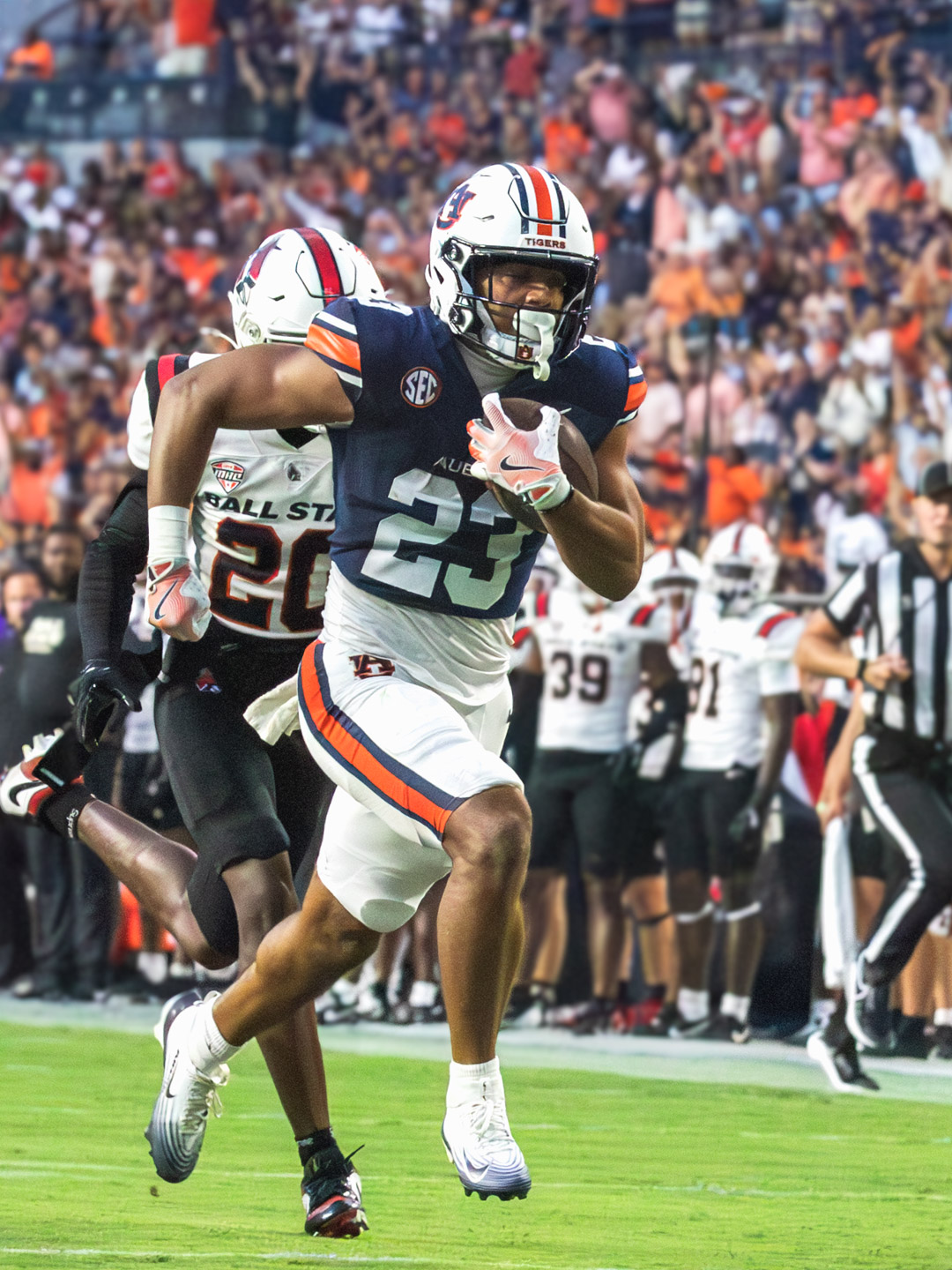
- Cobb with the Auburn Tigers in 2025

No. 23 – Auburn Tigers
- Position: Running back
- Class: Senior

Personal information
- Born: October 27, 2004 (age 22)
- Listed height: 5 ft 11 in (1.80 m)
- Listed weight: 205 lb (93 kg)

Career information
- High school: Montgomery Catholic (Montgomery, Alabama)
- College: Auburn (2023–present)

Awards and highlights
- Third-team All-SEC (2025)
- Stats at ESPN

Jeremiah Cobb (born October 27, 2004) is an American football running back who currently plays for the Auburn Tigers.

== Early life ==
Cobb played for Montgomery Catholic Preparatory School in Montgomery, Alabama. He rushed for over 6,500 yards and scored 75 touchdowns. He was rated the ninth best running back in the 2023 class by 247Sports.

== College career ==
=== 2023 ===
Cobb committed to Auburn University in February 2023. He played his first game against the UMass Minutemen, where he scored his first career touchdown. He scored two rushing touchdowns and two receiving touchdowns in the season.

=== 2024 ===
Cobb was considered one of the top three running backs on the team during the 2024 season. Damari Alston was seen as his main competitor on the depth chart. He rushed for 142 yards, and had 45 receiving yards.

=== 2025 ===
Cobb suffered a broken finger in the preseason, but was cleared to play in early August. Head coach Hugh Freeze predicted that he would have a breakout season. In his first game of the season, against the Baylor Bears, he rushed for 74 yards in 16 carries, including one touchdown run. He made his first start of the season against the Ball State Cardinals, where he rushed for a career-high 121 yards and two touchdowns. He finished the season with 969 rushing yards in 175 carries, along with five touchdowns.

=== 2026 ===
Cobb announced his intent to return for the 2026 season in January of the same year.
