= 2025 Colorado Buffaloes football team =

American college football season

2025 Colorado Buffaloes football
- Conference: Big 12 Conference
- Record: 3–9 (1–8 Big 12)
- Head coach: Deion Sanders (3rd season)
- Offensive coordinator: Pat Shurmur (3rd season; first 8 games); Brett Bartolone (interim; remainder of season)
- Offensive scheme: Multiple spread
- Defensive coordinator: Robert Livingston (2nd season)
- Base defense: 4–3
- Home stadium: Folsom Field

Uniform

2025 Big 12 Conference football standings
	Conf.			Overall
Team	W		L	W		L
No. 7 Texas Tech y$^	8	–	1	12	–	2
No. 11 BYU y	8	–	1	12	–	2
No. 14 Utah	7	–	2	11	–	2
No. 22 Houston	6	–	3	10	–	3
Arizona	6	–	3	9	–	4
Arizona State	6	–	3	8	–	5
No. 25 TCU	5	–	4	9	–	4
Iowa State	5	–	4	8	–	4
Cincinnati	5	–	4	7	–	6
Kansas State	5	–	4	6	–	6
Baylor	3	–	6	5	–	7
Kansas	3	–	6	5	–	7
UCF	2	–	7	5	–	7
West Virginia	2	–	7	4	–	8
Colorado	1	–	8	3	–	9
Oklahoma State	0	–	9	1	–	11
Championship: Texas Tech 34, BYU 7
^ – College Football Playoff participant; $ – Conference champion; y – Championship game participant; Rankings from AP Poll

The 2025 Colorado Buffaloes football team represented the University of Colorado Boulder as a member of the Big 12 Conference during the 2025 NCAA Division I FBS football season. The Buffaloes were led by third-year head coach Deion Sanders. They played their home games on campus at Folsom Field in Boulder, Colorado.

== Offseason ==
=== 2025 NFL draft ===
Round	Pick	Player	Position	Team
1	2	Travis Hunter	WR/CB	Jacksonville Jaguars
5	144	Shedeur Sanders	QB	Cleveland Browns
6	203	LaJohntay Wester	WR	Baltimore Ravens
6	208	Jimmy Horn Jr.	WR	Carolina Panthers

=== Transfers ===
==== Outgoing ====
Player	Position	Destination
Nikhai Hill-Green	LB	Alabama
Walter Taylor III	QB	Ball State
Chijoke Nwankwo	DT	Blinn
Morgan Pearson	TE	Central Missouri
Tyler Johnson	OL	Coastal Carolina
Johnny Chaney Jr.	LB	FIU
Asaad Waseem	WR	Florida Atlantic
Trenton Hood	LB	Georgia Military
Savion Riley	DB	Georgia Tech
Kahlil Benson	OL	Indiana
Trevor Woods	LB	Jacksonville State
Ian Massey	DB	Lamar
Rayyan Buell	DL	Memphis
Nahmier Robinson	DB	Memphis
Yakiri Walker	OL	Memphis
Payton Kirkland	OL	Miami (OH)
Cordale Russell	WR	Miami (OH)
Aiden DeCorte	LS	Michigan State
Zack Owens	OL	Mississippi State
Destin Wade	QB	North Alabama
Adrian Wilson	WR	North Carolina
Taje McCoy	DE	Oklahoma State
Hank Zilinskas	OL	Rutgers
Isaiah Augustave	RB	South Carolina
Malakai Murphy	DB	Southern Miss
Jordan Onovughe	WR	Stanford
Colton Hood	DB	Tennessee
Dayon Hayes	DE	Texas A&M
Cash Cleveland	OL	Texas Tech
Carter Miller	OL	UCF
Brandon Hood	RB	UMass
Kyeran Garcia	LB	West Virginia State
Jaylen Wester	LB	Western Kentucky
Angel Lopez	CB	Unknown
Ethan Boyd	OL	Unknown
Adonis Forrest	S	Unknown
Sam Hart	TE	Unknown
Chidozie Nwankwo	DL	Unknown
Jay Gardenhire	OL	Unknown
Ebenezer Bouzi	DB	Unknown
Jeremiah Brown	LB	Withdrawn

==== Incoming ====
Player	Position	Previous school
Jehiem Oatis	DL	Alabama
Terrance Love	S	Auburn
Sincere Brown	WR	Campbell
Simeon Price	RB	Coastal Carolina
Hykeem Williams	WR	Florida State
Gavriel Lightfoot	DL	Fresno State
Luke Whiting	LS	Georgia Tech
Zy Crisler	OL	Illinois
Teon Parks	DB	Illinois State
DeKalon Taylor	RB	Incarnate Word
Reginald Hughes	LB	Jacksonville State
Damon Greaves	P	Kansas
Noah King	DB	Kansas State
Kaidon Salter	QB	Liberty
Buck Buchanan	K	Louisiana Tech
Zarian McGill	OL	Louisiana Tech
Carter Miller	OL	Louisiana–Monroe
Andre Roye Jr.	OL	Maryland
Xavier Hill	OL	Memphis
Shaun Myers	LB	North Alabama
Zach Atkins	TE	Northwest Missouri State
Cooper Lovelace	OL	Northwestern
Makari Vickers	DB	Oklahoma
Mana Taimani	OL	Ole Miss
Kylan Salter	LB	TCU
John Slaughter	DB	Tennessee
Larry Johnson III	OL	Tennessee
Aki Ogunbiyi	OL	Texas A&M
Tavian Coleman	DL	Texas State
Joseph Williams	WR	Tulsa
Walker Andersen	OL	UCLA
Tawfiq Byard	S	USF
Jack Hestera	WR	Utah State
Martavius French	LB	UTSA
Tyrecus Davis	DB	Wyoming

=== Recruiting class ===
College recruiting (2025)
Name	Hometown	School	Height	Weight	Commit date
Julian Lewis; QB	Carrollton, GA	Carrollton High School	6 ft 1 in (1.85 m)	185 lb (84 kg)	Nov 21, 2024
Julian Lewis; QB	Recruit ratings: Rivals: 247Sports: ESPN: (93)				
London Merritt; DE	Atlanta, GA	IMG Academy (FL)	6 ft 3 in (1.91 m)	240 lb (110 kg)	Nov 28, 2024
London Merritt; DE	Recruit ratings: Rivals: 247Sports: ESPN: (84)				
Carde Smith; OT	Mobile, AL	Lillie B. Williamson High School	6 ft 5 in (1.96 m)	300 lb (140 kg)	Nov 28, 2024
Carde Smith; OT	Recruit ratings: Rivals: 247Sports: ESPN: (81)				
Christian Hudson; DT	Daytona Beach, FL	Mainland High School	6 ft 1 in (1.85 m)	280 lb (130 kg)	Oct 25, 2024
Christian Hudson; DT	Recruit ratings: Rivals: 247Sports: ESPN: (80)				
Adrian Wilson; WR	Pflugerville, TX	Weiss High School	6 ft 1 in (1.85 m)	170 lb (77 kg)	Oct 26, 2024
Adrian Wilson; WR	Recruit ratings: Rivals: 247Sports: ESPN: (80)				
Quentin Gibson; WR	Fort Worth, TX	North Crowley High School	5 ft 9 in (1.75 m)	170 lb (77 kg)	Nov 28, 2024
Quentin Gibson; WR	Recruit ratings: Rivals: 247Sports: ESPN: (80)				
Chauncey Gooden; OL	Nashville, TN	David Lipscomb High School	6 ft 4 in (1.93 m)	330 lb (150 kg)	Jun 24, 2024
Chauncey Gooden; OL	Recruit ratings: Rivals: 247Sports: ESPN: (80)				
Antonio Branch Jr. S	Miami, FL	Miami Northwestern High School	6 ft 3 in (1.91 m)	175 lb (79 kg)	Sep 23, 2024
Antonio Branch Jr. S	Recruit ratings: Rivals: 247Sports: ESPN: (80)				
Quanell X. Farrakhan Jr. WR	Houston, TX	North Shore High School	6 ft 0 in (1.83 m)	176 lb (80 kg)	Jul 13, 2024
Quanell X. Farrakhan Jr. WR	Recruit ratings: Rivals: 247Sports: ESPN: (80)				
Alexander McPherson; DE	Stuart, FL	IMG Academy	6 ft 5 in (1.96 m)	250 lb (110 kg)	Nov 28, 2024
Alexander McPherson; DE	Recruit ratings: Rivals: 247Sports: ESPN: (78)				
Zayne DeSouza; TE	Loveland, CO	Loveland High School	6 ft 6 in (1.98 m)	270 lb (120 kg)	Aug 2, 2024
Zayne DeSouza; TE	Recruit ratings: Rivals: 247Sports: ESPN: (76)				
Mantrez Walker; LB	Buford, GA	Buford High School	6 ft 0 in (1.83 m)	218 lb (99 kg)	Apr 27, 2024
Mantrez Walker; LB	Recruit ratings: Rivals: 247Sports: ESPN: (76)				
Corbin Laisure; TE	Johnson City, TN	Science Hill High School	6 ft 5 in (1.96 m)	225 lb (102 kg)	Apr 27, 2024
Corbin Laisure; TE	Recruit ratings: Rivals: 247Sports: ESPN: (76)				
Jay Gardenhire; OT	West Bloomfield, MI	West Bloomfield High School	6 ft 8 in (2.03 m)	350 lb (160 kg)	Jun 26, 2024
Jay Gardenhire; OT	Recruit ratings: Rivals: 247Sports: ESPN: (74)				
Overall recruit ranking: Rivals: #44 247Sports: #27
Note: In many cases, Scout, Rivals, 247Sports, On3, and ESPN may conflict in their listings of height and weight.; In these cases, the average was taken. ESPN grades are on a 100-point scale.; Sources: "Rivals commits". Rivals.; "ESPN commits". ESPN.; "2025 Team Ranking". Rivals.com.; "247Sports commits". 247Sports.

== Schedule ==
Date	Time	Opponent	Site	TV	Result	Attendance
August 29	6:00 p.m.	Georgia Tech*	Folsom Field; Boulder, CO	ESPN	L 20–27	52,868
September 6	1:30 p.m.	Delaware*	Folsom Field; Boulder, CO	FOX	W 31–7	50,341
September 12	5:30 p.m.	at Houston	TDECU Stadium; Houston, TX	ESPN	L 20–36	37,899
September 20	8:15 p.m.	Wyoming*	Folsom Field; Boulder, CO	ESPN	W 37–20	53,442
September 27	8:15 p.m.	No. 25 BYU	Folsom Field; Boulder, CO	ESPN	L 21–24	52,265
October 4	5:30 p.m.	at TCU	Amon G. Carter Stadium; Fort Worth, TX	FOX	L 21–35	43,160
October 11	1:30 p.m.	No. 22 Iowa State	Folsom Field; Boulder, CO	ESPN	W 24–17	52,698
October 25	8:15 p.m.	at Utah	Rice–Eccles Stadium; Salt Lake City, UT (Rumble in the Rockies)	ESPN	L 7–53	51,949
November 1	5:00 p.m.	Arizona^{†}	Folsom Field; Boulder, CO	FS1	L 17–52	48,322
November 8	10:00 a.m.	at West Virginia	Milan Puskar Stadium; Morgantown, WV	TNT/TruTV	L 22–29	55,510
November 22	6:00 p.m.	No. 25 Arizona State	Folsom Field; Boulder, CO	ESPN2	L 17–42	43,348
November 29	10:00 a.m.	at Kansas State	Bill Snyder Family Football Stadium; Manhattan, KS (rivalry)	FS1	L 14–24	49,549
*Non-conference game; ^{†}Homecoming; Rankings from AP (and CFP Rankings, after November 5) -; All times are in Mountain time; Source:

== Game summaries ==
=== vs Georgia Tech ===
Georgia Tech Yellow Jackets (0–0) at Colorado Buffaloes (0–0) – Game summary

Quarter	1	2	3	4	Total
Yellow Jackets	0	13	7	7	27
Buffaloes	7	3	3	7	20

at Folsom Field • Boulder, Colorado

- Date: August 29, 2025
- Game time: 6:00 p.m. MDT
- Game weather: Mostly Cloudy; 72 °F (22 °C);
- Game attendance: 52,868
- Referee: Michael VanderVelde
- TV announcers (ESPN): Dave Pasch (play-by-play), Dusty Dvoracek (analyst), and Taylor McGregor (sideline)

Game information

First quarter

- (12:08) COL – Dekalon Taylor 8-yard pass from Kaidon Salter, Alejandro Mata kick (Drive: 5 plays, 36 yards, 2:27; Colorado 7–0)

Second quarter

- (13:31) GT – Aidan Birr 32-yard field goal (Drive: 13 plays, 84 yards, 6:30; Colorado 7–3)
- (4:33) GT – Haynes King 4-yard run, Aidan Birr kick (Drive: 10 plays, 80 yards, 5:57; Georgia Tech 10–7)
- (1:39) COL – Alejandro Mata 42-yard field goal (Drive: 8 plays, 51 yards, 2:54; Tied 10–10)
- (0:00) GT – Aidan Birr 43-yard field goal (Drive: 9 plays, 49 yards, 1:39; Georgia Tech 13–10)

Third quarter

- (6:00) COL – Alejandro Mata 29-yard field goal (Drive: 8 plays, 39 yards, 4:15; Tied 13–13)
- (0:14) GT – Haynes King 17-yard run, Aidan Birr kick (Drive: 11 plays, 75 yards, 5:46; Georgia Tech 20–13)

Fourth quarter

- (8:25) COL – Kaidon Salter 7-yard run, Alejandro Mata kick (Drive: 15 plays, 75 yards, 6:49; Tied 20–20)
- (1:07) GT – Haynes King 45-yard run, Aidan Birr kick (Drive: 5 plays, 61 yards, 1:44; Georgia Tech 27–20)

Statistics	GT	COLO
First downs	27	19
Plays–yards	68–463	60–305
Rushes–yards	47–320	31–146
Passing yards	143	159
Passing: comp–att–int	13–21–1	17–29–0
Turnovers	3	0
Time of possession	32:23	27:37

Team	Category	Player	Statistics
Georgia Tech	Passing	Haynes King	13/20, 143 yards, INT
Georgia Tech	Rushing	Haynes King	19 carries, 156 yards, 3 TD
Georgia Tech	Receiving	Bailey Stockton	4 receptions, 48 yards
Colorado	Passing	Kaidon Salter	17/28, 159 yards, TD
Colorado	Rushing	Micah Welch	11 carries, 64 yards
Colorado	Receiving	Omarion Miller	1 reception, 39 yards

=== vs Delaware ===
Delaware Fightin' Blue Hens (1–0) at Colorado Buffaloes (0–1) – Game summary

Quarter	1	2	3	4	Total
Fightin' Blue Hens	0	7	0	0	7
Buffaloes	7	10	7	7	31

at Folsom Field • Boulder, Colorado

- Date: September 6, 2025
- Game time: 1:30 p.m. MDT
- Game weather: Sunny; 75 °F (24 °C)
- Game attendance: 50,341
- Referee: Kevin Boitmann
- TV announcers (FOX): Jason Benetti (play-by-play), Robert Griffin III (analyst), and Alexa Landestoy (sideline)

Game information

First quarter

- COLO – Kaidon Salter 9-yard run (Alejandro Mata kick), 5:33. Buffaloes 7–3. Drive: 12 plays, 87 yards, 6:06.

Second quarter

- COLO – Alejandro Mata 28-yard field goal, 13:03. Buffaloes 10–0. Drive: 12 plays, 43 yards, 3:59.
- DEL – Jo Silver 4-yard pass from Nick Minicucci (Nate Reed kick) 0:45. Buffaloes 10–7. Drive: 7 plays, 80 yards, 2:54.
- COLO – DeKalon Taylor 21-yard pass from Ryan Staub (Alejandro Mata kick) 0:09. Buffaloes 17–7. Drive: 6 plays, 75 yards, 0:36.

Third quarter

- COLO – Sincere Brown 71-yard pass from Ryan Staub (Alejandro Mata kick) 13:46. Buffaloes 24–7. Drive: 3 plays, 75 yards, 1:14.

Fourth quarter

- COLO – Micah Welch 10-yard run (Alejandro Mata kick), 14:13. Buffaloes 31–7. Drive: 5 plays, 24 yards, 2:23.

Statistics	DEL	COLO
First downs	19	21
Plays–yards	66–396	70–398
Rushes–yards	30–84	39–131
Passing yards	312	267
Passing: comp–att–int	18–36–1	22–31–0
Turnovers	3	0
Time of possession	27:03	32:57

Team	Category	Player	Statistics
Delaware	Passing	Nick Minicucci	18/36, 312 yards, TD, INT
Delaware	Rushing	Jo Silver	11 carries, 47 yards
Delaware	Receiving	Jake Thaw	4 receptions, 85 yards
Colorado	Passing	Ryan Staub	7/10, 157 yards, 2 TD
Colorado	Rushing	Simeon Price	9 carries, 55 yards
Colorado	Receiving	Sincere Brown	4 receptions, 120 yards, TD

=== at Houston ===
Colorado Buffaloes (1–1) at Houston Cougars (2–0) – Game summary

Quarter	1	2	3	4	Total
Buffaloes	0	14	0	6	20
Cougars	10	6	10	10	36

at TDECU Stadium • Houston, Texas

- Date: September 12, 2025
- Game time: 5:30 p.m. MDT
- Game weather: Sunny; 89 °F (32 °C)
- Game attendance: 37,899
- Referee: David Alvarez
- TV announcers (ESPN): Anish Shroff (play-by-play), Andre Ware (analyst), and Paul Carcaterra (sideline)

Game information

First quarter

- (6:42) HOU – Ethan Sanchez 52-yard field goal (Drive: 10 plays, 63 yards, 3:57; Houston 3–0)
- (3:52) HOU – Dean Connors 4-yard run, Ethan Sanchez kick (Drive: 5 plays, 79 yards, 1:35; Houston 10–0)

Second quarter

- (14:13) HOU – Ethan Sanchez 43-yard field goal (Drive: 8 plays, 44 yards, 3:05; Houston 13–0)
- (7:34) COL – Simeon Price 38-yard run, Alejandro Mata kick (Drive: 10 plays, 93 yards, 4:14; Houston 13–7)
- (1:45) HOU – Ethan Sanchez 47-yard field goal (Drive: 12 plays, 46 yards, 5:49; Houston 16–7)
- (0:26) COL – Ryan Staub 19-yard run, Zach Atkins fumble recovery, Alejandro Mata kick (Drive: 6 plays, 88 yards, 1:13; Houston 16–14)

Third quarter

- (6:25) HOU – Ethan Sanchez 35-yard field goal (Drive: 17 plays, 57 yards, 8:35; Houston 19–14)
- (1:21) HOU – Conner Weigman 1-yard run, Ethan Sanchez kick (Drive: 9 plays, 76 yards, 4:14; Houston 26–14)

Fourth quarter

- (11:39) HOU – Conner Weigman 7-yard run, Ethan Sanchez kick (Drive: 3 plays, 61 yards, 1:22; Houston 33–14)
- (4:34) COL – Joseph Williams 37-yard pass from Ryan Staub, two-point conversion failed (Drive: 6 plays, 83 yards, 2:22; Houston 33–20)
- (3:34) HOU – Ethan Sanchez 49-yard field goal (Drive: 4 plays, 7 yards, 0:51; Houston 36–20)

Statistics	COLO	HOU
First downs	15	21
Plays–yards	58–300	77–431
Rushes–yards	23–96	53–209
Passing yards	204	222
Passing: Comp–Att–Int	19–35–2	15–24–0
Turnovers	2	0
Time of possession	23:15	36:45

Team	Category	Player	Statistics
Colorado	Passing	Ryan Staub	19/35, 204 yards, TD, 2 INT
Colorado	Rushing	Simeon Price	5 carries, 51 yards, TD
Colorado	Receiving	Omarion Miller	3 receptions, 54 yards
Houston	Passing	Conner Weigman	15/24, 222 yards
Houston	Rushing	Dean Connors	22 carries, 89 yards, TD
Houston	Receiving	Stephon Johnson	5 receptions, 117 yards

=== vs Wyoming ===
Wyoming Cowboys (2–1) at Colorado Buffaloes (1–2) – Game summary

Quarter	1	2	3	4	Total
Cowboys	0	3	10	7	20
Buffaloes	0	21	7	9	37

at Folsom Field • Boulder, Colorado

- Date: September 20, 2025
- Game time: 8:15 p.m. MDT
- Game weather: Cloudy; 68 °F (20 °C)
- Game attendance: 53,442
- Referee: Luke Richmond
- TV announcers (ESPN): Dave Flemming (play-by-play), Brock Osweiler (analyst), and Stormy Buonantony (sideline)

Game information

First quarter

- No scoring plays.

Second quarter

- (14:12) COLO – Omarion Miller 29-yard pass from Kaidon Salter, Alejandro Mata kick (Drive: 13 plays, 85 yards, 5:52; Colorado 7–0)
- (9:39) WYO – Erik Sandvik 28-yard field goal (Drive: 10 plays, 65 yards, 4:33; Colorado 7–3)
- (7:37) COLO – Sincere Brown 68-yard pass from Kaidon Salter, Alejandro Mata kick (Drive: 5 plays, 81 yards, 1:57; Colorado 14–3)
- (3:08) COLO – Simeon Price 1-yard run, Alejandro Mata kick (Drive: 8 plays, 67 yards, 2:42; Colorado 21–3)

Third quarter

- (13:55) COLO – Joseph Williams 47-yard pass from Kaidon Salter, Alejandro Mata kick (Drive: 3 plays, 75 yards, 1:05; Colorado 28–3)
- (12:25) WYO – Eric Richardson 41-yard pass from Kaden Anderson (Drive: 4 plays, 75 yards, 1:30; Colorado 28–10)
- (3:30) WYO – Erik Sandvik 38-yard field goal (Drive: 13 plays, 73 yards, 6:25; Colorado 28–13)

Fourth quarter

- (14:55) COLO – Arden Walker safety (Colorado 30–13)
- (4:32) WYO – Chris Durr Jr. 7-yard pass from Kaden Anderson (Drive: 13 plays, 80 yards, 6:49; Colorado 30–20)
- (1:46) COLO – Kaidon Salter 35-yard run, Alejandro Mata kick (Drive: 7 plays, 75 yards, 2:46; Colorado 37–20)

Statistics	WYO	COLO
First downs	20	23
Plays–yards	67–347	59–497
Rushes–yards	41–165	31–193
Passing yards	182	304
Passing: comp–att–int	12–26–0	18–28–0
Turnovers	0	1
Time of possession	32:04	27:56

Team	Category	Player	Statistics
Wyoming	Passing	Kaden Anderson	11/25, 176 yards, 2 TD
Wyoming	Rushing	Samuel Harris	19 carries, 126 yards
Wyoming	Receiving	Chris Durr Jr	5 receptions, 50 yards, TD
Colorado	Passing	Kaidon Salter	18/28, 304 yards, 3 TD
Colorado	Rushing	Kaidon Salter	11 carries, 86 yards, TD
Colorado	Receiving	Omarion Miller	6 receptions, 88 yards, TD

=== vs No. 25 BYU ===
No. 25 BYU Cougars (3–0) at Colorado Buffaloes (2–2) – Game summary

Quarter	1	2	3	4	Total
No. 25 Cougars	3	7	7	7	24
Buffaloes	14	0	7	0	21

at Folsom Field • Boulder, Colorado

- Date: September 27, 2025
- Game time: 8:15 p.m. MDT
- Game weather: Clear; 64 °F (18 °C)
- Game attendance: 52,265
- Referee: Mike McCabe
- TV announcers (ESPN): Mark Jones (play-by-play), Roddy Jones (analyst), and Quint Kessenich (sideline)

Game information

First quarter

- (9:44) COLO – Kaidon Salter 3-yard run, Alejandro Mata kick (Drive: 11 plays, 75 yards, 5:16; Colorado 7–0)
- (6:31) COLO – Dre'lon Miller 5-yard run, Alejandro Mata kick (Drive: 4 plays, 62 yards, 1:23; Colorado 14–0)
- (0:45) BYU – Will Ferrin 28-yard field goal (Drive: 8 plays, 65 yards, 4:23; Colorado 14–3)

Second quarter

- (0:46) BYU – Chase Roberts 5-yard pass from Bear Bachmeier, Will Ferrin kick (Drive: 10 plays, 94 yards, 3:24; Colorado 14–10)

Third quarter

- (5:26) BYU – Chase Roberts 4-yard pass from Bear Bachmeier, Will Ferrin kick (Drive: 9 plays, 74 yards, 4:51; BYU 17–14)
- (2:42) COLO – Dre'lon Miller 19-yard pass from Kaidon Salter, Alejandro Mata kick (Drive: 6 plays, 75 yards, 2:44; Colorado 21–17)

Fourth quarter

- (14:02) BYU – Cody Hagen 32-yard run, Will Ferrin kick (Drive: 8 plays, 77 yards, 3:33; BYU 24–21)

Statistics	BYU	COLO
First downs	27	17
Plays–yards	65–387	53–291
Rushes–yards	36–208	37–172
Passing yards	179	119
Passing: comp–att–int	19–29–0	11–16–1
Turnovers	0	1
Time of possession	33:35	26:25

Team	Category	Player	Statistics
BYU	Passing	Bear Bachmeier	19/27, 179 yards, 2 TD
BYU	Rushing	Bear Bachmeier	15 carries, 98 yards
BYU	Receiving	Chase Roberts	5 receptions, 49 yards, 2 TD
Colorado	Passing	Kaidon Salter	11/16, 119 yards, TD, INT
Colorado	Rushing	Micah Welch	11 carries, 67 yards
Colorado	Receiving	Joseph Williams	5 receptions, 56 yards

=== at TCU ===
Colorado Buffaloes (2–3) at TCU Horned Frogs (3–1) – Game summary

Quarter	1	2	3	4	Total
Buffaloes	0	14	0	7	21
Horned Frogs	0	14	0	21	35

at Amon G. Carter Stadium • Fort Worth, Texas

- Date: October 4, 2025
- Game time: 5:30 p.m. MDT
- Game weather: Clear, 86 °F (30 °C)
- Game attendance: 43,160
- Referee: Henry Jones
- TV announcers (FOX): Connor Onion (play-by-play), Robert Griffin III (analyst), and Alexa Landestoy (sideline)

Game information

First quarter

- No scoring plays.

Second quarter

- (13:33) COL – Omarion Miller 6-yard pass from Kaidon Salter, Alejandro Mata kick (Drive: 13 plays, 80 yards, 6:54; Colorado 7–0)
- (6:32) COL – Kaidon Salter 10-yard run, Alejandro Mata kick (Drive: 12 plays, 45 yards, 5:19; Colorado 14–0)
- (2:38) TCU – Josh Hoover 1-yard run, Nate McCashland kick (Drive: 10 plays, 76 yards, 3:49; Colorado 14–7)
- (1:32) TCU – Eric McAlister 23-yard pass from Josh Hoover, Nate McCashland kick (Drive: 2 plays, 33 yards, 0:21; Tied 14–14)

Third quarter

- No scoring plays.

Fourth quarter

- (14:04) TCU – Lafayette Kaiuway 10-yard pass from Josh Hoover, Nate McCashland kick (Drive: 12 plays, 67 yards, 5:25; TCU 21–14)
- (11:42) COL – Omarion Miller 31-yard pass from Kaidon Salter, Alejandro Mata kick (Drive: 5 plays, 50 yards, 2:22; Tied 21–21)
- (5:44) TCU – Joseph Manjack IV 18-yard pass from Josh Hoover, Nate McCashland kick (Drive: 3 plays, 27 yards, 1:12; TCU 28–21)
- (0:19) TCU – Eric McAlister 21-yard pass from Josh Hoover, Nate McCashland kick (Drive: 7 plays, 59 yards, 2:14; TCU 35–21)

Statistics	COLO	TCU
First downs	20	23
Plays–yards	65–343	68–369
Rushes–yards	35–126	35–94
Passing yards	217	275
Passing: Comp–Att–Int	18–30–3	23–33–0
Turnovers	4	0
Time of possession	31:32	28:28

Team	Category	Player	Statistics
Colorado	Passing	Kaidon Salter	18/29, 217 yards, 2 TD, 3 INT
Colorado	Rushing	Dallan Hayden	9 carries, 61 yards
Colorado	Receiving	Omarion Miller	6 receptions, 89 yards, 2 TD
TCU	Passing	Josh Hoover	23/33, 275 yards, 4 TD
TCU	Rushing	Kevorian Barnes	16 carries, 48 yards
TCU	Receiving	Eric McAlister	4 receptions, 65 yards, 2 TD

=== vs No. 22 Iowa State ===
No. 22 Iowa State Cyclones (5–1) at Colorado Buffaloes (2–4) – Game summary

Quarter	1	2	3	4	Total
No. 22 Cyclones	0	10	7	0	17
Buffaloes	7	0	14	3	24

at Folsom Field • Boulder, Colorado

- Date: October 11, 2025
- Game time: 1:30 p.m. MDT
- Game weather: Cloudy; 64 °F (18 °C)
- Game attendance: 52,698
- Referee: Stephen Baron
- TV announcers (ESPN): Mike Monaco (play-by-play), Louis Riddick (analyst), and Kris Budden (sideline)

Game information

First quarter

- (0:00) COL – Micah Welch 8-yard run, Alejandro Mata kick (Drive: 12 plays, 90 yards, 5:04; Colorado 7–0)

Second quarter

- (6:40) ISU – Chase Smith 38-yard field goal (Drive: 8 plays, 50 yards, 4:08; Colorado 7–3)
- (0:22) ISU – Abu Sama III 1-yard run, Chase Smith kick (Drive: 10 plays, 96 yards, 1:45; Iowa State 10–7)

Third quarter

- (14:13) COL – Omarion Miller 70-yard pass from Kaidon Salter, Alejandro Mata kick (Drive: 2 plays, 73 yards, 0:42; Colorado 14–10)
- (9:26) ISU – Abu Sama III 1-yard run, Chase Smith kick (Drive: 9 plays, 75 yards, 4:47; Iowa State 17–14)
- (4:26) COL – Joseph Williams 3-yard pass from Kaidon Salter, Alejandro Mata kick (Drive: 10 plays, 52 yards, 4:51; Colorado 21–17)

Fourth quarter

- (5:13) COL – Alejandro Mata 29-yard field goal (Drive: 4 plays, 7 yards, 1:54; Colorado 24–17)

Statistics	ISU	COLO
First downs	22	16
Plays–yards	70–441	64–395
Rushes–yards	37–236	39–140
Passing yards	205	255
Passing: comp–att–int	18–33–1	16–25–0
Turnovers	1	0
Time of possession	29:57	30:03

Team	Category	Player	Statistics
Iowa State	Passing	Rocco Becht	18/33, 205 yards, INT
Iowa State	Rushing	Abu Sama III	24 carries, 177 yards, 2 TD
Iowa State	Receiving	Benjamin Brahmer	5 receptions, 56 yards
Colorado	Passing	Kaidon Salter	16/25, 255 yards, 2 TD
Colorado	Rushing	Dallan Hayden	12 carries, 58 yards
Colorado	Receiving	Joseph Williams	8 receptions, 128 yards, TD

=== at Utah (Rumble in the Rockies) ===
Colorado Buffaloes (3–4) at Utah Utes (5–2) – Game summary

Quarter	1	2	3	4	Total
Buffaloes	0	0	0	7	7
Utes	17	26	3	7	53

at Rice–Eccles Stadium • Salt Lake City, Utah

- Date: October 25, 2025
- Game time: 8:15 p.m. MDT
- Game weather: Cloudy; 67 °F (19 °C)
- Game attendance: 51,949
- Referee: Cravonne Barrett
- TV announcers (ESPN): Roy Philpott (play-by-play), Brock Osweiler (analyst), and Stormy Bounantony (sideline)

Game information

First quarter

- (14:23) UTAH – Byrd Ficklin 63-yard run, Dillon Curtis kick (Drive: 2 plays, 75 yards, 0:37; Utah 7–0)
- (4:51) UTAH – Dillon Curtis 53-yard field goal (Drive: 11 plays, 40 yards, 4:30; Utah 10–0)
- (2:53) UTAH – Wayshawn Parker 58-yard run, Dillon Curtis kick (Drive: 1 play, 58 yards, 0:13; Utah 17–0)

Second quarter

- (14:30) UTAH – Team safety (Drive: 3 plays, -10 yards, 0:22; Utah 19–0)
- (12:50) UTAH – JJ Buchanan 22-yard pass from Byrd Ficklin, Dillon Curtis kick (Drive: 4 plays, 72 yards, 1:39; Utah 26–0)
- (3:42) UTAH – NaQuari Rogers 2-yard run, Dillon Curtis kick (Drive: 16 plays, 60 yards, 7:21; Utah 33–0)
- (2:08) UTAH – Larry Simmons 20-yard pass from Byrd Ficklin, Dillon Curtis kick (Drive: 2 plays, 21 yards, 0:34; Utah 40–0)
- (0:00) UTAH – Dillon Curtis 23-yard field goal (Drive: 4 plays, 2 yards, 0:41; Utah 43–0)

Third quarter

- (1:42) UTAH – Dillon Curtis 45-yard field goal (Drive: 8 plays, 27 yards, 3:48; Utah 46–0)

Fourth quarter

- (9:03) COL – Ryan Staub 1-yard run, Alejandro Mata kick (Drive: 9 plays, 59 yards, 3:52; Utah 46–7)
- (3:12) UTAH – Nate Johnson 56-yard run, Dillon Curtis kick (Drive: 2 plays, 70 yards, 0:53; Utah 53–7)

Statistics	COLO	UTAH
First downs	25	12
Plays–yards	76–587	68–140
Rushes–yards	51–422	38–38
Passing yards	165	102
Passing: Comp–Att–Int	11–25–0	13–30–1
Turnovers	0	1
Time of possession	33:38	26:22

Team	Category	Player	Statistics
Colorado	Passing	Ryan Staub	4/8, 65 yards
Colorado	Rushing	Kam Mikell	8 carries, 44 yards
Colorado	Receiving	Omarion Miller	3 receptions, 59 yards
Utah	Passing	Byrd Ficklin	10/22, 140 yards, 2 TD
Utah	Rushing	Byrd Ficklin	20 carries, 151 yards, TD
Utah	Receiving	Larry Simmons	2 receptions, 39 yards, TD

=== vs Arizona ===
Arizona Wildcats (4–3) at Colorado Buffaloes (3–5) – Game summary

Quarter	1	2	3	4	Total
Wildcats	17	21	14	0	52
Buffaloes	0	7	7	3	17

at Folsom Field • Boulder, Colorado

- Date: November 1, 2025
- Game time: 5:00 p.m. MDT
- Game weather: Clear; 64 °F (18 °C)
- Game attendance: 48,322
- Referee: Henry Johns
- TV announcers (FS1): Tim Brando (play-by-play), Devin Gardner (analyst), and Josh Sims (sideline)

Game information

First quarter

- (13:53) ARIZ – Tre Spivey 57-yard pass from Noah Fifita, Michael Salgado-Medina kick (Drive: 3 plays, 75 yards, 1:07; Arizona 7–0)
- (7:56) ARIZ – Michael Salgado-Medina 49-yard field goal (Drive: 8 plays, 19 yards, 3:35; Arizona 10–0)
- (7:08) ARIZ – Kris Hutson 12-yard pass from Noah Fifita, Michael Salgado-Medina kick (Drive: 1 plays, 12 yards, 0:06; Arizona 17–0)

Second quarter

- (14:28) COL – Omarion Miller 8-yard pass from Kaidon Salter, Alejandro Mata kick (Drive: 17 plays, 75 yards, 7:40; Arizona 17–7)
- (12:38) ARIZ – Gio Richardson 60-yard pass from Noah Fifita, Michael Salgado-Medina kick (Drive: 4 plays, 75 yards, 1:50; Arizona 24–7)
- (4:53) ARIZ – Javin Whatley 13-yard run, Michael Salgado-Medina kick (Drive: 2 plays, 8 yards, 0:46; Arizona 31–7)
- (0:21) ARIZ – Javin Whatley 34-yard pass from Noah Fifita, Michael Salgado-Medina kick (Drive: 9 plays, 65 yards, 2:35; Arizona 38–7)

Third quarter

- (12:06) ARIZ – Ismail Mahdi 7-yard run, Michael Salgado-Medina kick (Drive: 2 plays, 17 yards, 0:47; Arizona 45–7)
- (10:13) COL – Omarion Miller 59-yard pass from Kaidon Salter, Alejandro Mata kick (Drive: 5 plays, 75 yards, 1:53; Arizona 45–14)
- (9:11) ARIZ – Kedrick Reescano 1-yard run, Michael Salgado-Medina kick (Drive: 4 plays, 75 yards, 1:02; Arizona 52–14)

Fourth quarter

- (2:04) COL – Alejandro Mata 31-yard field goal (Drive: 5 plays, 21 yards, 2:19; Arizona 52–14)

Statistics	ARIZ	COLO
First downs	16	16
Plays–yards	63–417	77–299
Rushes–yards	38–204	42–129
Passing yards	213	170
Passing: comp–att–int	11–25–0	20–35–3
Turnovers	2	5
Time of possession	25:51	34:09

Team	Category	Player	Statistics
Arizona	Passing	Noah Fifita	11/19, 213 yards, 4 TD
Arizona	Rushing	Ismail Mahdi	4 carries, 91 yards, TD
Arizona	Receiving	Gio Richardson	2 receptions, 63 yards, TD
Colorado	Passing	Julian Lewis	9/17, 121 yards, TD
Colorado	Rushing	Kaidon Salter	9 carries, 27 yards
Colorado	Receiving	Omarion Miller	5 receptions, 91 yards, 2 TD

=== at West Virginia ===
Colorado Buffaloes (3–6) at West Virginia Mountaineers (3–6) – Game summary

Quarter	1	2	3	4	Total
Buffaloes	0	9	7	6	22
Mountaineers	9	10	3	7	29

at Milan Puskar Stadium • Morgantown, West Virginia

- Date: November 8, 2025
- Game time: 10:00 a.m. MST
- Game weather: Sunny • Temperature: 60 °F (16 °C) • Wind: SW at 10 miles per hour (16 km/h)
- Game attendance: 55,510
- Referee: Mike McCabe
- TV announcers (TNT/TruTV): J.B. Long (play-by-play), Mike Golic Jr. (analyst), and Jared Greenberg (sideline)

Game information

First quarter

- (4:35) WVU – Team safety (West Virginia 2–0)
- (0:19) WVU – Curtis Jones Jr. 2-yard run, Kade Hensley kick (Drive: 11 plays, 75 yards, 4:10; West Virginia 9–0)

Second quarter

- (06:02) COL – Alejandro Mata 23-yard field goal (Drive: 13 plays, 70 yards, 5:03; West Virginia 9–3)
- (3:29) WVU – Ryan Ward 3-yard pass from Scotty Fox Jr., Kade Hensley kick (Drive: 6 plays, 75 yards, 2:33; West Virginia 16–3)
- (0:45) COL – Joseph Williams 9-yard pass from Julian Lewis (Drive: 6 plays, 77 yards, 2:36; West Virginia 16–9)
- (0:00) WVU – Kade Hensley 41-yard field goal (Drive: 6 plays, 52 yards, 0:45; West Virginia 19–9)

Third quarter

- (07:19) COL – Omarion Miller 23-yard pass from Julian Lewis, Alejandro Mata kick (Drive: 2 plays, 20 yards, 0:47; West Virginia 19–16)
- (1:47) WVU – Kade Hensley 37-yard field goal (Drive: 15 plays, 56 yards, 5:32; West Virginia 22–16)

Fourth quarter

- (14:51) COL – Alejandro Mata 35-yard field goal (Drive: 6 plays, 53 yards, 1:49; West Virginia 22–19)
- (4:15) WVU – Curtis Jones Jr. 4-yard run, Kade Hensley kick (Drive: 10 plays, 57 yards, 5:33; West Virginia 29–19)
- (1:16) COL – Alejandro Mata 38-yard field goal (Drive: 13 plays, 55 yards, 2:57; West Virginia 29–19)

Statistics	COLO	WVU
First downs	19	21
Plays–yards	73–350	81–369
Rushes–yards	38–51	53–167
Passing yards	299	202
Passing: Comp–Att–Int	22–35–0	17–28–2
Turnovers	1	3
Time of possession	29:24	30:36

Team	Category	Player	Statistics
Colorado	Passing	Julian Lewis	22/35, 299 yards, 2 TD
Colorado	Rushing	Dre'lon Miller	10 carries, 42 yards
Colorado	Receiving	Omarion Miller	6 receptions, 131 yards, TD
West Virginia	Passing	Scotty Fox Jr.	17/28, 202 yards, TD, 2 INT
West Virginia	Rushing	Scotty Fox Jr.	17 carries, 58 yards
West Virginia	Receiving	Diore Hubbard	6 receptions, 94 yards

=== vs No. 25 Arizona State ===
No. 25 Arizona State Sun Devils (7–3) at Colorado Buffaloes (3–7) – Game summary

Quarter	1	2	3	4	Total
No. 25 Sun Devils	3	10	8	21	42
Buffaloes	7	0	10	0	17

at Folsom Field • Boulder, Colorado

- Date: November 22, 2025
- Game time: 6:00 p.m. MST
- Game weather: Clear; 46 °F (8 °C)
- Game attendance: 43,348
- Referee: Henry Johns
- TV announcers (ESPN2): Mike Monaco (play-by-play), Kirk Morrison (analyst), and Dawn Davenport (sideline)

Game information

First quarter

- (9:23) ASU – Jesús Gómez 39-yard field goal (Drive: 8 plays, 59 yards, 2:44; Arizona State 3–0)
- (0:03) COL – Dallan Hayden 7-yard run, Alejandro Mata kick (Drive: 4 plays, 57 yards, 1:47; Colorado 7–3)

Second quarter

- (3:19) ASU – Raleek Brown 33-yard pass from Jeff Sims, Jesús Gómez kick (Drive: 8 plays, 77 yards, 5:05; Arizona State 10–7)
- (0:05) ASU – Jesús Gómez 39-yard field goal (Drive: 6 plays, 63 yards, 0:56; Arizona State 13–7)

Third quarter

- (12:02) COL – Omarion Miller 22-yard pass from Julian Lewis, Alejandro Mata kick (Drive: 6 plays, 79 yards, 2:53; Colorado 14–13)
- (10:35) ASU – Derek Eusebio 68-yard pass from Jeff Sims, Khamari Anderson pass for two-point conversion (Drive: 3 plays, 75 yards, 1:27; Arizona State 21–14)
- (5:25) COL – Alejandro Mata 28-yard field goal (Drive: 4 plays, -1 yards, 2:07; Arizona State 21–17)

Fourth quarter

- (13:31) ASU – Raleek Brown 88-yard run, Jesús Gómez kick (Drive: 1 plays, 88 yards, 0:13; Arizona State 28–17)
- (8:48) ASU – Kanye Udoh 3-yard run, Jesús Gómez kick (Drive: 6 plays, 74 yards, 2:59; Arizona State 35–17)
- (1:20) ASU – Jason Brown Jr. 3-yard run, Jesús Gómez kick (Drive: 10 plays, 76 yards, 6:34; Arizona State 42–17)

Statistics	ASU	COLO
First downs	23	12
Plays–yards	71–580	69–300
Rushes–yards	45–355	30–135
Passing yards	225	165
Passing: comp–att–int	12–26–1	20–39–0
Turnovers	4	1
Time of possession	33:08	26:52

Team	Category	Player	Statistics
Arizona State	Passing	Jeff Sims	11/24, 206 yards, 2 TD, INT
Arizona State	Rushing	Raleek Brown	22 carries, 255 yards, TD
Arizona State	Receiving	Derek Eusebio	4 receptions, 87 yards, TD
Colorado	Passing	Julian Lewis	19/38, 161 yards, TD
Colorado	Rushing	Dallan Hayden	10 carries, 65 yards, TD
Colorado	Receiving	Sincere Brown	3 receptions, 50 yards

=== at Kansas State (rivalry) ===
Colorado Buffaloes (3–8) at Kansas State Wildcats (5–6) – Game summary

Quarter	1	2	3	4	Total
Buffaloes	0	7	0	7	14
Wildcats	7	0	7	10	24

at Bill Snyder Family Football Stadium • Manhattan, Kansas

- Date: November 29, 2025
- Game time: 10:00 a.m. MST
- Game weather: Cloudy, 32 °F (0 °C)
- Game attendance: 49,549
- Referee: Luke Richmond
- TV announcers (FS1): Eric Collins (play-by-play) and Spencer Tillman (analyst)

Game information

First quarter

- (7:40) KSU – Joe Jackson 4-yard run, Luis Rodriguez kick (Drive: 13 plays, 74 yards, 7:13; Kansas State 7–0)

Second quarter

- (0:18) COL – Micah Welch 1-yard run, Alejandro Mata kick (Drive: 11 plays, 84 yards, 2:03; Tied 7–7)

Third quarter

- (4:32) KSU – Joe Jackson 1-yard run, Luis Rodriguez kick (Drive: 6 plays, 56 yards, 2:52; Kansas State 14–7)

Fourth quarter

- (10:23) KSU – Luis Rodriguez 35-yard field goal (Drive: 15 plays, 61 yards, 6:43; Kansas State 17–7)
- (7:03) COL – Micah Welch 1-yard run, Alejandro Mata kick (Drive: 9 plays, 75 yards, 3:20; Kansas State 17–14)
- (2:37) KSU – Joe Jackson 17-yard run, Luis Rodriguez kick (Drive: 8 plays, 75 yards, 4:26; Kansas State 24–14)

Statistics	COLO	KSU
First downs	18	16
Plays–yards	72–323	60–321
Rushes–yards	47–151	43–206
Passing yards	172	115
Passing: Comp–Att–Int	14–25–1	10–17–0
Turnovers	1	0
Time of possession	29:23	30:37

Team	Category	Player	Statistics
Colorado	Passing	Kaidon Salter	14/25, 172 yards, INT
Colorado	Rushing	Kaidon Salter	15 carries, 63 yards
Colorado	Receiving	Omarion Miller	7 receptions, 120 yards
Kansas State	Passing	Avery Johnson	10/17, 115 yards
Kansas State	Rushing	Joe Jackson	26 carries, 142 yards, 3 TD
Kansas State	Receiving	Jaron Tibbs	4 receptions, 55 yards

== Roster ==
2025 Colorado Buffaloes football team roster
Players
Coaches
Offense

Pos.	#	Name	Class
QB	3	Kaidon Salter	Sr
WR	4	Omarion Miller	Jr
WR	5	Hykeem Williams	Jr
WR	6	Dre'lon Miller	So
RB	7	Dallan Hayden	Jr
WR	8	Joseph Williams	So
WR	9	Sincere Brown	GS
QB	10	Julian Lewis	Fr
WR	13	Kaleb Mathis	So
QB	14	Colton Allen	Jr
WR	14	Quanell Farrakhan Jr.	Fr
WR	15	Quentin Gibson	Fr
QB	16	Ryan Staub	So
WR	17	Isaiah Hardge	So
WR	18	Kam Mikell	Fr
RB	20	DeKalon Taylor	Sr
RB	26	Simeon Price	Sr
RB	29	Micah Welch	So
TE	31	Sav'ell Smalls	Sr
WR	32	Tagert Bardin	So
RB	34	Titus Bautista	Fr
WR	36	Carson Westbrook	Fr
RB	44	Charlie Offerdahl	Sr
WR	45	Ronald Coleman	So
WR	47	Gavin Marsh	So
RB	48	Christian Sarem	Jr
OL	51	Chauncey Gooden	Fr
OL	52	Andre Roye Jr.	Jr
OL	53	Larry Johnson III	Jr
OT	54	Phillip Houston	Sr
G	55	Kareem Harden	Sr
G	56	Tyler Brown	Sr
OL	57	Mana Taimani	GS
OL	58	Zarian McGill	GS
G	59	Yahya Attia	Fr
OL	65	Carde Smith	Fr
OL	70	Cooper Lovelace	GS
OL	71	Xavier Hill	GS
OL	72	Zylon Crisler	GS
OL	73	Walker Anderson	Fr
OL	74	Aki Ogunbiyi	GS
OT	77	Jordan Seaton	So
OL	78	Hudson Steber	Fr
WR	81	Jack Hestera	Sr
WR	82	Terrell Timmons Jr.	Sr
TE	83	Zayne DeSouza	Fr
TE	85	Zach Atkins	Jr
TE	86	Brady Kopetz	Jr
TE	87	Charlie Williams	So
TE	88	Corbin Laisure	Fr

Defense

Pos.	#	Name	Class
CB	3	Teon Parks	Jr
CB	4	Preston Hodge	Sr
CB	5	RJ Johnson	Jr
S	6	Terrance Love	Jr
CB	8	DJ McKinney	Jr
S	9	Tawfiq Byard	So
CB	9	Tyrecus Davis	GS
CB	10	Makari Vickers	So
S	13	John Slaughter	So
CB	20	Noah King	Fr
S	22	TJ Branch	Fr
S	23	Carter Stoutmire	Jr
CB	25	Kyle Carpenter	Fr
DE	27	Keaten Wade	Sr
S	28	Ben Finneseth	Sr
CB	29	Ivan Yates	GS
CB	30	Braden Keith	Jr
CB	33	Kole Mathis	Fr
S	36	Nathaniel Watson	So
ILB	37	Martavius French	GS
ILB	38	Mantrez Walker	Fr
ILB	40	Shaun Myers	GS
LB	41	Kylan Salter	So
ILB	42	Jeremiah Brown	GS
DE	44	London Merritt	Fr
DE	49	Quency Wiggins	Jr
LB	50	Reginald Hughes	GS
DE	53	Arden Walker	Sr
ILB	54	Bo Simmons-Lapena	Jr
ILB	55	Gage Goldberg	Fr
DE	58	Nikhil Webb Walker	Jr
DE	59	Tristan Marois	Sr
DT	88	Amari McNeill	Sr
DT	90	Taurean Carter II	GS
DT	90	Jehiem Oatis	Jr
DE	91	Brandon Davis-Swain	Fr
DT	92	Anquin Barnes Jr.	Sr
DE	93	Samuel Okunlola	Jr
DT	94	Tavian Coleman	GS
DT	95	Tawfiq Thomas	Sr
DT	97	Christian Hudson	Fr
DE	98	Alexander McPherson	Fr
DT	99	Gavriel Lightfoot	Sr

Special teams

Pos.	#	Name	Class
K	16	Alejandro Mata	Sr
K	18	Alexander Stoyanovich	Fr
P	35	Damon Greaves	Jr
K/P	38	Daniel Gerlach	So
LS	39	Kameron Hawkins	Sr
K	43	Buck Buchanan	Sr
LS	45	Luke Whiting	So
K	46	Elliot Arnold	Fr
LS	79	Camden Dempsey	Sr
LS	96	Gabe Landers	Jr

Head coach

- Deion Sanders

Coordinators/assistant coaches

- Robert Livingston – Defensive coordinator/Safeties
- Pat Shurmur – Offensive coordinator/Quarterbacks
- Brett Bartolone – Offensive pass game coordinator/Tight ends
- George Helow – Defensive run game coordinator/Defensive ends
- Kevin Mathis – Defensive passing game coordinator/Cornerbacks
- Gunnar White – Offensive run game coordinator/Offensive line
- Marshall Faulk – Assistant head coach/Running backs
- Andre Gurode – Offensive line
- Andre' Hart – Linebackers
- George Hegamin – Offensive line
- Domata Peko – Defensive line
- Jason Phillips – Wide receivers
- Michael Pollock – Special teams coordinator
- Warren Sapp – Defensive pass rush coordinator
- Rashad Davis – Offensive analyst
- Johnnie Mack – Offensive analyst
- Skyler Mornhinweg – Analyst
- Anthony Balancier – Quality control, defense
- Oliver Clear – Quality control analyst
- Grant Hammer – Quality control analyst
- Andrew Zimmer – Quality control analyst
- Dante Carter – Graduate assistant
- Isaac Kresge – Graduate assistant
- Caden Lowrie – Graduate assistant

Legend

- (C) Team captain
- (S) Suspended
- (I) Ineligible
- Injured
- Redshirt

Roster
Last update: 7/28/25
