= 2025 Houston Cougars football team =

American college football season

2025 Houston Cougars football

Texas Bowl champion

Texas Bowl, W 38–35 vs. LSU
- Conference: Big 12 Conference

Ranking
- Coaches: No. 19
- AP: No. 22
- Record: 10–3 (6–3 Big 12)
- Head coach: Willie Fritz (2nd season)
- Offensive coordinator: Slade Nagle (1st season)
- Offensive scheme: Spread
- Defensive coordinator: Austin Armstrong (1st season)
- Base defense: 3–3–5
- Home stadium: TDECU Stadium

2025 Big 12 Conference football standings
	Conf.			Overall
Team	W		L	W		L
No. 7 Texas Tech y$^	8	–	1	12	–	2
No. 11 BYU y	8	–	1	12	–	2
No. 14 Utah	7	–	2	11	–	2
No. 22 Houston	6	–	3	10	–	3
Arizona	6	–	3	9	–	4
Arizona State	6	–	3	8	–	5
No. 25 TCU	5	–	4	9	–	4
Iowa State	5	–	4	8	–	4
Cincinnati	5	–	4	7	–	6
Kansas State	5	–	4	6	–	6
Baylor	3	–	6	5	–	7
Kansas	3	–	6	5	–	7
UCF	2	–	7	5	–	7
West Virginia	2	–	7	4	–	8
Colorado	1	–	8	3	–	9
Oklahoma State	0	–	9	1	–	11
Championship: Texas Tech 34, BYU 7
^ – College Football Playoff participant; $ – Conference champion; y – Championship game participant; Rankings from AP Poll

The 2025 Houston Cougars football team represented the University of Houston in the Big 12 Conference during the 2025 NCAA Division I FBS football season. The Cougars were led by Willie Fritz in his second season as their head coach. The Cougars played their home games at TDECU Stadium, soon to be renamed Space City Financial Stadium, located in Houston, Texas.

The Houston Cougars drew an average home attendance of 32,215.

== Offseason ==
=== Transfers ===
==== Outgoing ====
Player	Position	Destination
Maurice Williams	S	Arizona State
Justin Benton	DL	East Carolina
Parker Jenkins	RB	East Carolina
Teagan Wilk	S	East Carolina
Justin Wood	LS	FIU
Jeremiah Wilson	CB	Florida State
Jett Runion	TE	Houston Christian
Ja'Ryan Wallace	WR	Houston Christian
Andon Mata	WR	Howard Payne
Sam Secrest	IOL	Louisville
A. J. Haulcy	S	LSU
Tony Mathis	RB	Marshall
Pierson Parent	LS	McNeese
Keionte Scott	S	Miami (FL)
Juwon Gaston	CB	Middle Tennessee
Ray'Quan Bell	IOL	Prairie View A&M
Hershey McLaurin	S	Purdue
Jalyn Stanford	S	Sam Houston
Torren Coppage-El	DL	Stephen F. Austin
Joseph Manjack	WR	TCU
Jonah Wilson	WR	Texas A&M
Garfield Lawrence	DL	Texas Southern
Anthony Holmes	DL	Texas Tech
Taleeq Robbins	DL	Troy
Ui Ale	QB	Troy
Matthew Byrnes	TE	UNLV
Jalen Emery	CB	Western Kentucky
Caleb McMickle	QB	Western Kentucky
Nadame Tucker	EDGE	Western Michigan
Carter Jenkins	S	Unknown
Blake Hogshooter	WR	Unknown

==== Incoming ====
Player	Position	Previous School
Joshua Donald	DL	Appalachian State
Keionte Scott	CB	Auburn
Alvin Ebosele	OT	Baylor
Matthew Wykoff	IOL	California
Eddie Walls	EDGE	FIU
Weston Edwards	LS	Florida State
Marc Stampley	S	Georgia Southern
Harvey Broussard	WR	Louisiana
Carmycah Glass	LB	Louisiana
Blake Thompson	S	Louisiana Tech
Jordan Allen	S	LSU
McKenzie Agnello	OT	New Mexico
Zac Yoakam	K	Notre Dame
Jason Brooks	IOL	Oklahoma State
Ethan Sanchez	K	Old Dominion
Dean Connors	RB	Rice
Zelmar Vedder	CB	Sacramento State
C. J. Douglas	S	Samford
Will James	S	Southern Miss
Myles Parker	DL	Tennessee Tech
Conner Weigman	QB	Texas A&M
Dalton Merryman	IOL	Texas Tech
Jesus Machado	LB	Tulane
Luke McGary	LB	Tulsa
Will Spain	LS	Troy
Amare Thomas	WR	UAB
Sione Fotu	LB	Utah
Alvin Williamson Jr.	CB	Vanderbilt
Khalil Laufau	DL	Washington State
Tanner Koziol	TE	Wisconsin
Wrook Brown	S	Wyoming
Keany Parks	CB	Wyoming

== Schedule ==
Date	Time	Opponent	Rank	Site	TV	Result	Attendance
August 28	7:00 p.m.	No. 23 (FCS) Stephen F. Austin*		TDECU Stadium; Houston, TX	ESPN+	W 27–0	28,150
September 6	6:00 p.m.	at Rice*		Rice Stadium; Houston, TX (rivalry)	ESPN+	W 35–9	30,116
September 12	6:30 p.m.	Colorado		TDECU Stadium; Houston, TX	ESPN	W 36–20	37,899
September 26	9:30 p.m.	at Oregon State*		Reser Stadium; Corvallis, OR	ESPN	W 27–24 ^{OT}	29,338
October 4	6:00 p.m.	No. 11 Texas Tech		TDECU Stadium; Houston, TX (rivalry)	ESPN	L 11–35	42,806
October 11	11:00 a.m.	at Oklahoma State		Boone Pickens Stadium; Stillwater, OK	TNT/TruTV	W 39–17	44,941
October 18	11:00 a.m.	Arizona^{†}		TDECU Stadium; Houston, TX	FS1	W 31–28	28,535
October 25	7:00 p.m.	at No. 24 Arizona State		Mountain America Stadium; Tempe, AZ	ESPN2	W 24–16	54,256
November 1	11:00 a.m.	West Virginia	No. 22	TDECU Stadium; Houston, TX	FS1	L 35–45	25,049
November 7	7:00 p.m.	at UCF		Acrisure Bounce House; Orlando, FL	FS1	W 30–27	44,206
November 22	3:00 p.m.	TCU	No. 23	TDECU Stadium; Houston, TX	FOX	L 14–17	30,852
November 29	11:00 a.m.	at Baylor		McLane Stadium; Waco, TX (rivalry)	TNT	W 31–24	34,720
December 27	8:15 p.m.	vs. LSU*	No. 21	NRG Stadium; Houston, TX (Texas Bowl)	ESPN	W 38–35	63,867
*Non-conference game; ^{†}Homecoming; Rankings from AP Poll (and CFP Rankings, after November 4) - Released prior to game; All times are in Central time

== Rankings ==
Ranking movements Legend: ██ Increase in ranking ██ Decrease in ranking — = Not ranked RV = Received votes
	Week																
Poll	Pre	1	2	3	4	5	6	7	8	9	10	11	12	13	14	15	Final
AP	—	—	—	—	—	—	—	—	RV	22	RV	RV	25	—	RV	RV	22
Coaches	—	—	—	RV	RV	RV	—	RV	RV	22	RV	RV	24	RV	RV	24	19
CFP	Not released										—	—	23	—	21	21	Not released

== Game summaries ==
=== No. 23 (FCS) Stephen F. Austin ===
No. 23 (FCS) Stephen F. Austin Lumberjacks (0–0) at Houston Cougars (0–0) – Game summary

Quarter	1	2	3	4	Total
No. 23 (FCS) Lumberjacks	0	0	0	0	0
Cougars	7	10	7	3	27

at TDECU Stadium • Houston, TX

- Date: August 28
- Game time: 7:00 p.m. CDT
- Game weather:
- Game attendance: 28,150
- Referee: Kevin Mar
- TV announcers (ESPN+): Pete Sousa (play-by-play) and Taylor McHargue (analyst)

Game information

First quarter

- HOU – Tanner Koziol 11-yard pass from Conner Weigman (Ethan Sanchez kick), 5:12. Cougars 7–0. Drive: 7 plays, 41 yards, 2:58.

Second quarter

- HOU – Ethan Sanchez 40-yard field goal, 8:24. Cougars 10–0. Drive: 10 plays, 33 yards, 3:47.
- HOU – J'Marion Burnette 39-yard pass from Conner Weigman (Ethan Sanchez kick), 3:06. Cougars 17–0. Drive: 10 plays, 96 yards, 3:46.

Third quarter

- HOU – Amare Thomas 20-yard pass from Conner Weigman (Ethan Sanchez kick), 8:36. Cougars 24–0. Drive: 11 plays, 75 yards, 6:24.

Fourth quarter

- HOU – Ethan Sanchez 43-yard field goal, 14:06. Cougars 27–0. Drive: 4 plays, 3 yards, 0:49.

Statistics	SFA	HOU
First downs	7	18
Plays–yards	58–144	73–343
Rushes–yards	25–39	46–191
Passing yards	105	152
Passing: comp–att–int	17–33–2	16–27–0
Turnovers	2	0
Time of possession	25:11	34:49

Team	Category	Player	Statistics
Stephen F. Austin	Passing	Gavin Rutherford	4/7, 53 yards, INT
Stephen F. Austin	Rushing	Jaylen Jenkins	5 carries, 16 yards
Stephen F. Austin	Receiving	Clayton Wayland	2 receptions, 43 yards
Houston	Passing	Conner Weigman	15/24, 159 yards, 3 TD
Houston	Rushing	Dean Connors	15 carries, 50 yards
Houston	Receiving	Tanner Koziol	7 receptions, 63 yards, TD

=== at Rice (rivalry) ===
Houston Cougars (1–0) at Rice Owls (1–0) – Game summary

Quarter	1	2	3	4	Total
Cougars	0	7	7	21	35
Owls	0	3	0	6	9

at Rice Stadium • Houston, TX

- Date: September 6
- Game time: 6:00 p.m. CDT
- Game weather:
- Game attendance: 30,116
- Referee: Kevin Randall
- TV announcers (ESPN+): Kyle Youmans (play-by-play), Dave Steckel (analyst) and Maria Trivelpice (sideline)

Game information

First quarter

No scoring plays.

Second quarter

- RICE – Enock Gota 42-yard field goal, 9:20. Owls 3–0. Drive: 14 plays, 47 yards, 6:27.
- HOU – Dean Connors 54-yard run (Ethan Sanchez kick), 0:40. Cougars 7–3. Drive: 5 plays, 74 yards, 0:35.

Third quarter

- HOU – Conner Weigman 9-yard run (Ethan Sanchez kick), 6:24. Cougars 14–3. Drive: 15 plays, 76 yards, 6:50.

Fourth quarter

- HOU – Will James 37-yard interception return (Ethan Sanchez kick), 14:53. Cougars 21–3.
- RICE – Chase Jenkins 3-yard run (pass failed), 9:02. Cougars 21–9. Drive: 12 plays, 75 yards, 5:51.
- HOU – Stephon Johnson 74-yard pass from Conner Weigman (Ethan Sanchez kick), 8:19. Cougars 28–9. Drive: 2 plays, 75 yards, 0:43.
- HOU – Dean Connors 42-yard run (Ethan Sanchez kick), 3:40. Cougars 35–9. Drive: 3 plays, 49 yards, 0:57.

Statistics	HOU	RICE
First downs	14	16
Plays–yards	60–392	66–228
Rushes–yards	38–204	53–177
Passing yards	188	51
Passing: comp–att–int	15–22–0	11–13–1
Turnovers	0	2
Time of possession	27:14	32:46

Team	Category	Player	Statistics
Houston	Passing	Conner Weigman	15/22, 188 yards, TD
Houston	Rushing	Dean Connors	13 carries, 132 yards, 2 TD
Houston	Receiving	Stephon Johnson	1 reception, 74 yards, TD
Rice	Passing	Chase Jenkins	10/12, 50 yards, INT
Rice	Rushing	Daelen Alexander	10 carries, 55 yards
Rice	Receiving	Aaron Turner	3 receptions, 24 yards

=== Colorado ===
Colorado Buffaloes (1–1) at Houston Cougars (2–0) – Game summary

Quarter	1	2	3	4	Total
Buffaloes	0	14	0	6	20
Cougars	10	6	10	10	36

at TDECU Stadium • Houston, TX

- Date: September 12
- Game time: 6:30 p.m. CDT
- Game weather: Sunny; 89 °F (32 °C)
- Game attendance: 37,899
- Referee: David Alvarez
- TV announcers (ESPN): Anish Shroff (play-by-play), Andre Ware (analyst) and Paul Carcaterra (sideline)

Game information

First quarter

- (6:42) HOU – Ethan Sanchez 52-yard field goal (Drive: 10 plays, 63 yards, 3:57; Houston 3–0)
- (3:52) HOU – Dean Connors 4-yard run, Ethan Sanchez kick (Drive: 5 plays, 79 yards, 1:35; Houston 10–0)

Second quarter

- (14:13) HOU – Ethan Sanchez 43-yard field goal (Drive: 8 plays, 44 yards, 3:05; Houston 13–0)
- (7:34) COL – Simeon Price 38-yard run, Alejandro Mata kick (Drive: 10 plays, 93 yards, 4:14; Houston 13–7)
- (1:45) HOU – Ethan Sanchez 47-yard field goal (Drive: 12 plays, 46 yards, 5:49; Houston 16–7)
- (0:26) COL – Ryan Staub 19-yard run, Zach Atkins fumble recovery, Alejandro Mata kick (Drive: 6 plays, 88 yards, 1:13; Houston 16–14)

Third quarter

- (6:25) HOU – Ethan Sanchez 35-yard field goal (Drive: 17 plays, 57 yards, 8:35; Houston 19–14)
- (1:21) HOU – Conner Weigman 1-yard run, Ethan Sanchez kick (Drive: 9 plays, 76 yards, 4:14; Houston 26–14)

Fourth quarter

- (11:39) HOU – Conner Weigman 7-yard run, Ethan Sanchez kick (Drive: 3 plays, 61 yards, 1:22; Houston 33–14)
- (4:34) COL – Joseph Williams 37-yard pass from Ryan Staub, two-point conversion failed (Drive: 6 plays, 83 yards, 2:22; Houston 33–20)
- (3:34) HOU – Ethan Sanchez 49-yard field goal (Drive: 4 plays, 7 yards, 0:51; Houston 36–20)

Statistics	COLO	HOU
First downs	15	21
Plays–yards	58–300	77–431
Rushes–yards	23–96	53–209
Passing yards	204	222
Passing: comp–att–int	19–35–2	15–24–0
Turnovers	2	0
Time of possession	23:15	36:45

Team	Category	Player	Statistics
Colorado	Passing	Ryan Staub	19/35, 204 yards, TD, 2 INT
Colorado	Rushing	Simeon Price	5 carries, 51 yards, TD
Colorado	Receiving	Omarion Miller	3 receptions, 54 yards
Houston	Passing	Conner Weigman	15/24, 222 yards
Houston	Rushing	Dean Connors	22 carries, 89 yards, TD
Houston	Receiving	Stephon Johnson	5 receptions, 117 yards

=== at Oregon State ===
Houston Cougars (3–0) at Oregon State Beavers (0–4) – Game summary

Quarter	1	2	3	4	OT	Total
Cougars	0	10	0	14	3	27
Beavers	7	7	3	7	0	24

at Reser Stadium • Corvallis, OR

- Date: September 26
- Game time: 9:30 p.m. CDT
- Game weather: Clear • Temperature: 65 °F (18 °C) • Wind: N at 6 mph (9.7 km/h)
- Game attendance: 29,338
- Referee: Cravonne Barrett
- TV announcers (ESPN): Anish Shroff (play-by-play), Andre Ware (analyst), and Paul Carcaterra (sideline)

Game information

First quarter

- (8:12) ORST - Jake Reichle 1-yard run, Caleb Ojeda kick (Drive: 2 plays, 7 yards, 0:27; Oregon State 7-0)

Second quarter

- (13:43) ORST - Marquis Crosby 5-yard pass from Maalik Murphy, Caleb Ojeda kick (Drive: 11 plays, 70 yards, 6:20; Oregon State 14-0)
- (5:47) HOU - Ethan Sanchez 25-yard field goal (Drive: 21 plays, 85 yards, 7:47; Oregon State 14-3)
- (1:24) HOU - Conner Weigman 1-yard run, Ethan Sanchez kick (Drive: 7 plays, 55 yards, 1:48; Oregon State 14-10)

Third quarter

- (5:31) ORST - Caleb Ojeda 31-yard field goal (Drive: 7 plays, 48 yards, 3:39; Oregon State 17-10)

Fourth quarter

- (12:34) ORST - Cornell Hatcher Jr. 18-yard run, Cameron Smith kick (Drive: 12 plays, 80 yards, 6:54; Oregon State 24-10)
- (5:59) HOU - Stephon Johnson 27-yard pass from Conner Weigman, Ethan Sanchez kick (Drive: 8 plays, 76 yards, 2:18; Oregon State 24-17)
- (3:40) HOU - Tanner Koziol 50-yard pass from Conner Weigman, Ethan Sanchez kick (Drive: 4 plays, 64 yards, 0:51; Tied 24-24)

Overtime

HOU - Ethan Sanchez 24-yard field goal (Drive: 6 plays, 19 yards; Houston 27-24)

Statistics	HOU	ORST
First downs	17	22
Plays–yards	66–352	82–390
Rushes–yards	30–82	49–189
Passing yards	270	201
Passing: comp–att–int	20–36–1	20–33–0
Turnovers	1	0
Time of possession	24:37	35:23

Team	Category	Player	Statistics
Houston	Passing	Conner Weigman	20/36, 270 yards, 2 TD, INT
Houston	Rushing	Dean Connors	17 carries, 53 yards
Houston	Receiving	Amare Thomas	6 receptions, 104 yards
Oregon State	Passing	Maalik Murphy	20/33, 201 yards, TD
Oregon State	Rushing	Cornell Hatcher Jr.	17 carries, 93 yards, TD
Oregon State	Receiving	Trent Walker	7 receptions, 103 yards

=== No. 11 Texas Tech (rivalry) ===
No. 11 Texas Tech Red Raiders (4–0) at Houston Cougars (4–0) – Game summary

Quarter	1	2	3	4	Total
No. 11 Red Raiders	15	10	3	7	35
Cougars	3	8	0	0	11

at TDECU Stadium • Houston, TX

- Date: October 4
- Game time: 6:30 p.m. CDT
- Game weather: Cloudy, 88 °F (31 °C)
- Game attendance: 42,806
- Referee: Mike McCabe
- TV announcers (ESPN): Dave Pasch (play-by-play), Dusty Dvoracek (analyst), and Taylor McGregor (sideline)

Game information
First quarter
- TTU – Stone Harrington 26-yard field goal, 10:31. Red Raiders 3–0. Drive: 13 plays, 68 yards, 4:25.
- TTU – Upton Bellenfant 33-yard field goal, 9:38. Red Raiders 6–0. Drive: 4 plays, 1 yard, 0:47.
- TTU – Stone Harrington 23-yard field goal, 4:34. Red Raiders 9–0. Drive: 9 plays, 43 yards, 3:23.
- HOU – Ethan Sanchez 24-yard field goal, 2:16. Red Raiders 9–3. Drive: 8 plays, 69 yards, 2:14.
- TTU – Cameron Dickey 69-yard pass from Behren Morton (pass failed), 0:56. Red Raiders 15–3. Drive: 3 plays, 75 yards, 1:20.

Second quarter

- TTU – J'Koby Williams 5-yard run (Upton Bellenfant kick), 11:11. Red Raiders 22–3. Drive: 5 plays, 25 yards, 1:50.
- TTU – Stone Harrington 26-yard field goal, 1:53. Red Raiders 25–3. Drive: 10 plays, 47 yards, 4:12.
- HOU – Amare Thomas 64-yard pass from Zeon Chriss (Zeon Chriss pass to Stephon Johnson), 1:27. Red Raiders 25–11. Drive: 2 plays, 75 yards, 0:26.

Third quarter

- TTU – Upton Bellenfant 29-yard field goal, 7:44. Red Raiders 28–11. Drive: 13 plays, 73 yards, 5:42.

Fourth quarter

- TTU – J'Koby Williams 1-yard run (Upton Bellenfant kick), 11:34. Red Raiders 35–11. Drive: 7 plays, 38 yards, 3:22.

Statistics	TTU	HOU
First downs	27	12
Plays–yards	90–552	55–267
Rushes–yards	50–207	30–103
Passing yards	345	164
Passing: comp–att–int	28–40–0	10–25–2
Turnovers	1	3
Time of possession	37:58	22:02

Team	Category	Player	Statistics
Texas Tech	Passing	Behren Morton	28/40, 345 yards, TD
Texas Tech	Rushing	J'Koby Williams	20 carries, 109 yards, 2 TD
Texas Tech	Receiving	Caleb Douglas	7 receptions, 114 yards
Houston	Passing	Zeon Chriss	5/13, 93 yards, TD, INT
Houston	Rushing	Zeon Chriss	7 carries, 59 yards
Houston	Receiving	Amare Thomas	2 receptions, 70 yards, TD

=== at Oklahoma State ===
Houston Cougars (4–1) at Oklahoma State Cowboys (1–4) – Game summary

Quarter	1	2	3	4	Total
Cougars	10	14	12	3	39
Cowboys	7	3	0	7	17

at Boone Pickens Stadium • Stillwater, OK

- Date: October 11
- Game time: 11:00 a.m. CDT
- Game weather: Sunny • Temperature: 80 °F (27 °C) • Wind: SW at 6 mph (9.7 km/h)
- Game attendance: 44,941
- Referee: Tutashinda Salaam
- TV announcers (TNT): J.B. Long (play-by-play), Mike Golic Jr., (analyst) and Jared Greenberg (sideline)

Game information

First quarter

- (12:48) OKST – Rodney Fields Jr. 62-yard pass from Sharmar Rigby, Logan Ward kick (Drive: 5 plays, 75 yards, 2:23; OKST 7–0)
- (7:43) HOU – Conner Weigman 3-yard run, Ethan Sanchez kick (Drive: 9 plays, 78 yards, 4:50; Tied 7–7)
- (0:45) HOU – Ethan Sanchez 46-yard field goal (Drive: 10 pays, 16 yards, 3:31; HOU 10–7)

Second quarter

- (11:08) OKST – Logan Ward 37-yard field goal (Drive: 5 plays, 2 yards, 1:44; Tied 10–10)
- (5:39) HOU – Dean Connors 6-yard pass from Conner Weigman, Ethan Sanchez kick (Drive: 4 plays, 67 yards, 1:47; HOU 17–10)
- (3:20) HOU – Harvey Broussard III 14-yard pass from Conner Weigman, Ethan Sanchez kick (Drive: 4 plays, 67 yards, 1:47; HOU 24–10)

Third quarter

- (13:00) HOU – Ethan Sanchez 48-yard field goal (Drive: 7 plays, 45 yards, 2:00; HOU 27–10)
- (8:27) HOU – Ethan Sanchez 30-yard field goal (Drive: 7 plays, 68 yards, 3:15; HOU 30–10)
- (0:35) HOU – Dean Connors 2-yard run (Drive: 11 plays, 53 yards, 4:55; HOU 36–10)

Fourth quarter

- (7:43) HOU – Ethan Sanchez 29-yard field goal (Drive: 13 plays, 51 yards, 5:17; HOU 39–10)
- (3:55) OKST – Gavin Freeman 33-yard pass from Noah Walters, Logan Ward kick (Drive: 10 plays, 75 yards, 3:48; HOU 39–17)

Statistics	HOU	OKST
First downs	25	10
Plays–yards	79–485	51–225
Rushes–yards	45–166	31–45
Passing yards	319	180
Passing: comp–att–int	24–34–0	9–20–1
Turnovers	0	1
Time of possession	36:28	23:32

Team	Category	Player	Statistics
Houston	Passing	Conner Weigman	21/30, 306 yards, 2 TD
Houston	Rushing	Dean Connors	15 carries, 83 yards, TD
Houston	Receiving	Amare Thomas	7 receptions, 157 yards
Oklahoma State	Passing	Sam Jackson V	7/16, 84 yards, INT
Oklahoma State	Rushing	Rodney Fields Jr.	14 carries, 44 yards
Oklahoma State	Receiving	Rodney Fields Jr.	2 receptions, 63 yards, TD

=== Arizona ===
Arizona Wildcats (4–2) at Houston Cougars (5–1) – Game summary

Quarter	1	2	3	4	Total
Wildcats	14	0	0	14	28
Cougars	7	14	7	3	31

at TDECU Stadium • Houston, TX

- Date: October 18
- Game time: 11:00 a.m. CDT
- Game weather: Cloudy, 85 °F (29 °C)
- Game attendance: 28,535
- Referee: Kevin Boitmann
- TV announcers (FS1): Eric Collins (play-by-play) and Spencer Tillman (analyst)

Game information

First quarter

- (13:42) ARIZ – Tre Spivey 70-yard pass from Noah Fifita, Michael Salgado-Medina kick (Drive: 3 plays, 75 yards, 1:18; Arizona 7–0)
- (12:00) HOU – Amare Thomas 52-yard pass from Conner Weigman, Ethan Sanchez kick (Drive: 4 plays, 75 yards, 1:42; Tied 7–7)
- (6:18) ARIZ – Luke Wysong 13-yard pass from Noah Fifita, Michael Salgado-Medina kick (Drive: 11 plays, 73 yards, 5:36; Arizona 14–7)

Second quarter

- (5:51) HOU – Conner Weigman 10-yard run, Ethan Sanchez kick (Drive: 13 plays, 96 yards, 6:38; Tied 14–14)
- (0:16) HOU – Tanner Koziol 15-yard pass from Conner Weigman, Ethan Sanchez kick (Drive: 9 plays, 69 yards, 1:20; Houston 21–14)

Third quarter

- (5:56) HOU – Amare Thomas 2-yard pass from Conner Weigman, Ethan Sanchez kick (Drive: 17 plays, 75 yards, 9:04; Houston 28–14)

Fourth quarter

- (14:55) ARIZ – Tre Spivey 3-yard run, Michael Salgado-Medina kick (Drive: 13 plays, 75 yards, 6:01; Houston 28–21)
- (4:48) ARIZ – Kedrick Reescano 2-yard run, Michael Salgado-Medina kick (Drive: 10 plays, 70 yards, 6:52; Tied 28–28)
- (0:00) HOU – Ethan Sanchez 41-yard field goal (Drive: 13 plays, 52 yards, 4:48; Houston 31–28)

Statistics	ARIZ	HOU
First downs	23	23
Plays–yards	57–381	68–396
Rushes–yards	31–112	45–232
Passing yards	269	164
Passing: comp–att–int	24–26–0	15–23–0
Turnovers	0	0
Time of possession	30:28	29:32

Team	Category	Player	Statistics
Arizona	Passing	Noah Fifita	24/26, 269 yards, 2 TD
Arizona	Rushing	Ismail Mahdi	6 carries, 42 yards
Arizona	Receiving	Tre Spivey	1 reception, 70 yards, TD
Houston	Passing	Conner Weigman	15/23, 164 yards, 3 TD
Houston	Rushing	Dean Connors	20 carries, 100 yards
Houston	Receiving	Amare Thomas	4 receptions, 69 yards, 2 TD

=== at No. 24 Arizona State ===
Houston Cougars (6–1) at No. 24 Arizona State Sun Devils (5–2) – Game summary

Quarter	1	2	3	4	Total
Cougars	10	0	14	0	24
No. 24 Sun Devils	0	0	0	16	16

at Mountain America Stadium • Tempe, AZ

- Date: October 25
- Game time: 7:00 p.m. CST
- Game weather: Sunny • Temperature: 84 °F (29 °C) • Wind: W 3 mph
- Game attendance: 54,256
- Referee: Stephen Baron
- TV announcers (ESPN2): Lowell Galindo (play-by-play), Aaron Murray (analyst), and Lauren Sisler (sideline)

Game information

First quarter

- (10:29) HOU - Ethan Sanchez 26-yard field goal (Drive: 10 plays, 68 yards, 4:31; Houston 3-0)
- (0:41) HOU - Conner Weigman 1-yard run, Ethan Sanchez kick (Drive: 6 plays, 57 yards, 3:14; Houston 10-0)

Second quarter

- No scoring plays.

Third quarter

- (10:10) HOU - Tanner Koziol 7-yard pass from Conner Weigman, Ethan Sanchez kick (Drive: 6 plays, 57 yards, 3:14; Houston 17-0)
- (1:06) HOU - Conner Weigman 1-yard run, Ethan Sanchez kick (Drive: 10 plays, 75 yards, 4:43; Houston 24-0)

Fourth quarter

- (13:56) ASU - Cameron Harpole 3-yard pass from Sam Leavitt, two-point pass conversion failed (Drive: 8 plays, 75 yards, 2:12; Houston 24-6)
- (11:24) ASU - Jesus Gomez 47-yard field goal (Drive: 8 plays, 50 yards, 1:09; Houston 24-9)
- (5:12) ASU - Chamon Metayer 27-yard pass from Jeff Sims, Jesus Gomez kick (Drive: 7 plays, 70 yards, 2:03; Houston 24-16)

Statistics	HOU	ASU
First downs	22	19
Plays–yards	70–384	67–426
Rushes–yards	48–183	21–98
Passing yards	201	328
Passing: comp–att–int	17–22–0	24–46–0
Turnovers	0	1
Time of possession	37:02	22:58

Team	Category	Player	Statistics
Houston	Passing	Conner Weigman	17/22, 201 yards, TD
Houston	Rushing	Conner Weigman	21 carries, 111 yards, 2 TD
Houston	Receiving	Tanner Koziol	7 receptions, 100 yards, TD
Arizona State	Passing	Sam Leavitt	18/35, 270 yards, TD
Arizona State	Rushing	Raleek Brown	11 carries, 64 yards
Arizona State	Receiving	Malik McClain	7 receptions, 159 yards

=== West Virginia ===
West Virginia Mountaineers (2–6) at No. 22 Houston Cougars (7–1) – Game summary

Quarter	1	2	3	4	Total
Mountaineers	14	7	10	14	45
No. 22 Cougars	7	14	7	7	35

at TDECU Stadium • Houston, TX

- Date: November 1
- Game time: 11:00 a.m. CDT
- Game weather: Cloudy
- Game attendance: 25,049
- Referee: David Alvarez
- TV announcers (FS1): Connor Onion (play-by-play) and Mark Helfrich (analyst)

Game information

First quarter

- (10:31) WVU - Scotty Fox Jr. 6-yard run, Kade Hensley kick (Drive: 12 plays, 75 yards, 4:29; Mountaineers 7-0)
- (4:03) WVU - Cyncir Bowers 21-yard run, Kade Hensley kick (Drive: 10 plays, 89 yards, 4:15; Mountaineers 14-0)
- (0:58) HOU - Tanner Koziol 3-yard pass from Conner Weigman, Ethan Sanchez kick (Drive: 7 plays, 75 yards, 3:05; Mountaineers 14-7)

Second quarter

- (12:54) WVU - Cam Vaughn 24-yard pass from Scotty Fox Jr., Kade Hensley kick (Drive: 2 plays, 27 yards, 0:35; Mountaineers 21-7)
- (8:49) HOU - Conner Weigman 1-yard run, Ethan Sanchez kick (Drive: 8 plays, 75 yards, 4:05; Mountaineers 21-14)
- (3:03) HOU - Amare Thomas 9-yard pass from Conner Weigman, Ethan Sanchez kick (Drive: 5 plays, 47 yards, 2:01; Tied 21-21)

Third quarter

- (12:14) WVU - Kade Hensley 50-yard field goal (Drive: 6 plays, 15 yards, 1:59; Mountaineers 24-21)
- (6:33) WVU - Jordan Scruggs 80-yard interception return, Kade Hensley kick (Drive: 5 plays, 33 yards, 2:35; Mountaineers 31-21)
- (1:16) HOU - Amare Thomas 8-yard pass from Conner Weigman, Ethan Sanchez kick (Drive: 12 plays, 75 yards, 5:17; Mountaineers 31-28)

Fourth quarter

- (12:54) WVU - Scotty Fox Jr. 34-yard run, Kade Hensley kick (Drive: 8 plays, 73 yards, 3:17; Mountaineers 38-28)
- (7:15) WVU - Diore Hubbard 11-yard run, Kade Hensley kick (Drive: 7 plays, 71 yards, 3:26; Mountaineers 45-28)
- (6:24) HOU - Amare Thomas 27-yard pass from Conner Weigman, Ethan Sanchez kick (Drive: 4 plays, 68 yards, 0:45; Mountaineers 45-35)

Statistics	WVU	HOU
First downs	20	26
Plays–yards	76-403	67-400
Rushes–yards	53-246	31-82
Passing yards	157	318
Passing: comp–att–int	13-22-0	26-36-2
Turnovers	0	4
Time of possession	30:29	29:31

Team	Category	Player	Statistics
West Virginia	Passing	Scotty Fox Jr.	13/22, 157 yards, TD
West Virginia	Rushing	Diore Hubbard	29 carries, 108 yards, TD
West Virginia	Receiving	Jeff Weimer	3 receptions, 67 yards
Houston	Passing	Conner Weigman	25/35, 309 yards, 4 TD, 2 INT
Houston	Rushing	Dean Connors	13 carries, 71 yards
Houston	Receiving	Amare Thomas	10 receptions, 99 yards, 3 TD

=== at UCF ===
Houston Cougars (7–2) at UCF Knights (4–4) – Game summary

Quarter	1	2	3	4	Total
Cougars	0	17	7	6	30
Knights	3	21	3	0	27

at Acrisure Bounce House • Orlando, FL

- Date: November 7
- Game time: 7:15 p.m. CST
- Game weather: Clear; 72 °F (22 °C)
- Game attendance: 44,206
- Referee: Cravonne Barrett
- TV announcers (FS1): Dan Hellie (play-by-play) and Petros Papadakis (analyst)

Game information

First quarter

- UCF – Noe Ruelas 37-yard field goal, 4:17, Knights 3–0. Drive: 10 plays, 36 yards, 3:51.

Second quarter

- UCF – Myles Montgomery 1-yard run (Noe Ruelas kick), 9:39, Knights 10–0. Drive: 4 plays, 25 yards, 1:32.
- HOU – Amare Thomas 64-yard pass from Conner Weigman (Ethan Sanchez kick), 7:52, Knights 10–7. Drive: 4 plays, 75 yards, 1:47.
- HOU – Latreveon McCutchin 45-yard interception return (Ethan Sanchez kick), 6:36, Cougars 14–10.
- UCF – Jaden Nixon 15-yard run (Noe Ruelas kick), 2:05, Knights 17–14. Drive: 10 plays, 75 yards, 4:31.
- UCF – Phillip Dunnam 43-yard interception return (Noe Ruelas kick), 1:36, Knights 24–14.
- HOU – Ethan Sanchez 40-yard field goal, 0:00, Knights 24–17. Drive: 10 plays, 35 yards, 1:36.

Third quarter

- HOU – Dean Connors 9-yard pass from Conner Weigman (Ethan Sanchez kick), 7:38, Tied 24–24. Drive: 5 plays, 55 yards, 2:28.
- UCF – Noe Ruelas 54-yard field goal, 1:06, Knights 27–24. Drive: 5 plays, 27 yards, 1:38.

Fourth quarter

- HOU – Ethan Sanchez 30-yard field goal, 11:19, Tied 27–27. Drive: 11 plays, 63 yards, 4:47.
- HOU – Ethan Sanchez 22-yard field goal, 2:31, Cougars 30–27. Drive: 15 plays, 62 yards, 7:51.

Statistics	HOU	UCF
First downs	26	14
Plays–yards	80–433	60–282
Rushes–yards	49–210	30–146
Passing yards	223	136
Passing: comp–att–int	20–31–3	15–30–2
Turnovers	4	2
Time of possession	34:38	25:22

Team	Category	Player	Statistics
Houston	Passing	Conner Weigman	20/31, 223 yards, 2 TD, 3 INT
Houston	Rushing	Conner Weigman	22 carries, 82 yards
Houston	Receiving	Amare Thomas	5 receptions, 103 yards, TD
UCF	Passing	Tayven Jackson	15/29, 136 yards, INT
UCF	Rushing	Jaden Nixon	11 carries, 62 yards, TD
UCF	Receiving	Dylan Wade	6 receptions, 80 yards

=== TCU ===
TCU Horned Frogs (6–4) at No. 23 Houston Cougars (8–2) – Game summary

Quarter	1	2	3	4	Total
Horned Frogs	14	0	0	3	17
No. 23 Cougars	0	7	7	0	14

at TDECU Stadium • Houston, TX

- Date: November 22
- Game time: 3:00 p.m. CST
- Game weather: Clear; 78 °F (26 °C)
- Game attendance: 30,852
- Referee: Michael Vandervelde
- TV announcers (FOX): Tim Brando (play-by-play), Devin Gardner (analyst) and Josh Sims (sideline)

Game information

First quarter

- (11:20) TCU - Eric McAlister 33-yard pass from Josh Hoover, Nate McCashland kick (Drive: 8 plays, 75 yards, 3:40; Horned Frogs 7-0)
- (1:45) TCU - Jordan Dwyer 17-yard pass from Josh Hoover, Nate McCashland kick (Drive: 10 plays, 83 yards, 3:46; Horned Frogs 14-0)

Second quarter

- (8:21) HOU - Amare Thomas 15-yard pass from Conner Weigman, Ethan Sanchez kick (Drive: 11 plays, 62 yards, 5:36; Horned Frogs 14-7)

Third quarter

- (5:34) HOU - Dean Connors 8-yard pass from Conner Weigman, Ethan Sanchez kick (Drive: 6 plays, 71 yards, 3:09; Tied 14-14)

Fourth quarter

- (11:21) TCU - Nate McCashland 29-yard field goal (Drive: 7 plays, 17 yards, 3:12; Horned Frogs 17-14)

Statistics	TCU	HOU
First downs	22	17
Plays–yards	69–426	69–391
Rushes–yards	36–133	40–230
Passing yards	293	161
Passing: comp–att–int	24–33–3	15–29–1
Turnovers	4	1
Time of possession	27:32	32:28

Team	Category	Player	Statistics
TCU	Passing	Josh Hoover	24/33, 293 yards, 2 TD, 3 INT
TCU	Rushing	Jeremy Payne	18 carries, 103 yards
TCU	Receiving	Joseph Manjack IV	9 receptions, 95 yards
Houston	Passing	Conner Weigman	15/29, 161 yards, 2 TD, INT
Houston	Rushing	Conner Weigman	15 carries, 114 yards
Houston	Receiving	Amare Thomas	5 receptions, 72 yards, TD

=== at Baylor (rivalry) ===
Houston Cougars (8–3) at Baylor Bears (5–6) – Game summary

Quarter	1	2	3	4	Total
Cougars	7	10	7	7	31
Bears	0	9	0	15	24

at McLane Stadium • Waco, TX

- Date: November 29
- Game time: 11:00 a.m. CST
- Game weather: Cloudy; 66 °F (19 °C)
- Game attendance: 34,720
- Referee: Tuta Salaam
- TV announcers (TNT): J.B. Long (play-by-play), Mike Golic Jr. (analyst) and Coy Wire (sideline)

Game information

First quarter

- (7:47) HOU - Amare Thomas 27-yard pass from Conner Weigman, Ethan Sanchez kick (Drive: 12 plays, 82 yards, 5:18; Cougars 7-0)

Second quarter

- (14:13) HOU - Conner Weigman 28-yard run, Ethan Sanchez kick (Drive: 6 plays, 69 yards, 2:15; Cougars 14-0)
- (13:44) BAY - Connor Hawkins 54-yard field goal (Drive: 4 plays, 0 yards, 0:19; Cougars 14-3)
- (6:22) BAY - Connor Hawkins 34-yard field goal (Drive: 12 plays, 46 yards, 5:35; Cougars 14-6)
- (1:40) HOU - Ethan Sanchez 29-yard field goal (Drive: 12 plays, 64 yards, 4:42; Cougars 17-6)
- (0:15) BAY - Connor Hawkins 30-yard field goal (Drive: 12 plays, 62 yards, 1:25; Cougars 17-9)

Third quarter

- (4:58) HOU - Conner Weigman 1-yard run, Ethan Sanchez kick (Drive: 5 plays, 65 yards, 2:36; Cougars 24-9)

Fourth quarter

- (12:19) BAY - Joseph Dodds 1-yard run, Sawyer Robertson run for two-point conversion (Drive: 7 plays, 50 yards, 2:57; Cougars 24-17)
- (8:53) BAY - Josh Cameron 31-yard pass from Sawyer Robertson, Connor Hawkins kick (Drive: 5 plays, 44 yards, 1:20; Tied 24-24)
- (1:57) HOU - Dean Connors 1-yard run, Ethan Sanchez kick (Drive: 15 plays, 74 yards, 6:52; Cougars 31-24)

Statistics	HOU	BAY
First downs	29	25
Plays–yards	79–417	72–421
Rushes–yards	48–216	26–112
Passing yards	201	309
Passing: comp–att–int	21–31–1	23–46–1
Turnovers	1	2
Time of possession	36:26	23:34

Team	Category	Player	Statistics
Houston	Passing	Conner Weigman	21/31, 201 yards, TD, INT
Houston	Rushing	Conner Weigman	22 carries, 121 yards
Houston	Receiving	Amare Thomas	9 receptions, 97 yards, TD
Baylor	Passing	Sawyer Robertson	23/46, 309 yards, TD, INT
Baylor	Rushing	Joseph Dodds	12 carries, 61 yards, TD
Baylor	Receiving	Kobe Prentice	4 receptions, 96 yards

=== vs. LSU (Texas Bowl) ===
2025 Kinder's Texas Bowl
LSU Tigers (7–5) vs. No. 21 Houston Cougars (9–3) – Game summary

Quarter	1	2	3	4	Total
Tigers	14	0	7	14	35
No. 21 Cougars	7	14	7	10	38

at NRG Stadium • Houston, TX

- Date: December 27
- Game time: 8:15 p.m. CST
- Game attendance: 63,867
- Referee: Jason Nickleby
- TV announcers (ESPN): Tom Hart (play-by-play), Cole Cubelic (analyst) and Ian Fitzsimmons (sideline)

Game information

First quarter

- LSU – Barion Brown 99-yard kickoff return (Damian Ramos kick), 14:46. Tigers 7–0.
- LSU – Trey'Dez Green 23-yard pass from Michael Van Buren Jr. (Damian Ramos kick), 10:48. Tigers 14–0. Drive: 4 plays, 60 yards, 1:26.
- HOU – Amare Thomas 8-yard pass from Conner Weigman (Ethan Sanchez kick), 6:08. Tigers 14–7. Drive: 9 plays, 75 yards, 4:40.

Second quarter

- HOU – Amare Thomas 4-yard pass from Conner Weigman (Ethan Sanchez kick), 11:05. Tied 14–14. Drive: 14 plays, 73 yards, 6:59.
- HOU – Tanner Koziol 7-yard pass from Conner Weigman (Ethan Sanchez kick), 0:04. Cougars 21–14. Drive: 11 plays, 90 yards, 1:23.

Third quarter

- LSU – Trey'Dez Green 4-yard pass from Michael Van Buren Jr. (Damian Ramos kick), 9:31. Tied 21–21. Drive: 7 plays, 73 yards, 4:00.
- HOU – Traville Frederick Jr. 2-yard pass from Conner Weigman (Ethan Sanchez kick), 4:42. Cougars 28–21. Drive: 8 plays, 75 yards, 4:49.

Fourth quarter

- LSU – Kyle Parker 6-yard pass from Michael Van Buren Jr. (Damian Ramos Kick), 14:54. Tied 28–28. Drive: 5 plays, 72 yards, 1:35.
- HOU – Ethan Sanchez 25-yard field goal, 7:42. Cougars 31–28. Drive: 13 plays, 72 yards, 7:06.
- HOU – Dean Connors 20-yard run (Ethan Sanchez kick), 2:23. Cougars 38–28. Drive: 8 plays, 81 yards, 4:27.
- LSU – Zavion Thomas 3-yard run (Damian Ramos kick), 1:15. Cougars 38–35. Drive: 8 plays, 63 yards, 1:07.

Statistics	LSU	HOU
First downs	17	32
Plays–yards	50–344	82–437
Rushes–yards	24–77	46–201
Passing yards	267	236
Passing: comp–att–int	16–26–0	27–36–0
Turnovers	1	0
Time of possession	21:28	38:32

Team	Category	Player	Statistics
LSU	Passing	Michael Van Buren Jr.	16/26, 267 yards, 3 TD
LSU	Rushing	Harlem Berry	3 carries, 45 yards
LSU	Receiving	Trey'Dez Green	4 receptions, 80 yards, 2 TD
Houston	Passing	Conner Weigman	27/36, 236 yards, 4 TD
Houston	Rushing	Dean Connors	16 carries, 126 yards, TD
Houston	Receiving	Tanner Koziol	9 receptions, 76 yards, TD
