= 2025 West Virginia Mountaineers football team =

American college football season

2025 West Virginia Mountaineers football
- Conference: Big 12 Conference
- Record: 4–8 (2–7 Big 12)
- Head coach: Rich Rodriguez (8th season)
- Offensive scheme: Spread option
- Defensive coordinator: Zac Alley (1st season)
- Base defense: Multiple 4–2–5
- Home stadium: Milan Puskar Stadium

2025 Big 12 Conference football standings
| | Conf. | | | Overall |
| Team | W | | L | W | | L |
|---|---|---|---|---|---|---|
| No. 7 Texas Tech y$^ | 8 | – | 1 | 12 | – | 2 |
| No. 11 BYU y | 8 | – | 1 | 12 | – | 2 |
| No. 14 Utah | 7 | – | 2 | 11 | – | 2 |
| No. 22 Houston | 6 | – | 3 | 10 | – | 3 |
| Arizona | 6 | – | 3 | 9 | – | 4 |
| Arizona State | 6 | – | 3 | 8 | – | 5 |
| No. 25 TCU | 5 | – | 4 | 9 | – | 4 |
| Iowa State | 5 | – | 4 | 8 | – | 4 |
| Cincinnati | 5 | – | 4 | 7 | – | 6 |
| Kansas State | 5 | – | 4 | 6 | – | 6 |
| Baylor | 3 | – | 6 | 5 | – | 7 |
| Kansas | 3 | – | 6 | 5 | – | 7 |
| UCF | 2 | – | 7 | 5 | – | 7 |
| West Virginia | 2 | – | 7 | 4 | – | 8 |
| Colorado | 1 | – | 8 | 3 | – | 9 |
| Oklahoma State | 0 | – | 9 | 1 | – | 11 |
Championship: Texas Tech 34, BYU 7
^ – College Football Playoff participant; $ – Conference champion; y – Championship game participant; Rankings from AP Poll

The 2025 West Virginia Mountaineers football team represented West Virginia University as a member of the Big 12 Conference during the 2025 NCAA Division I FBS football season. The Mountaineers played their home games at Milan Puskar Stadium located in Morgantown, West Virginia. This was the first season under returning head coach Rich Rodriguez since 2007.

== Schedule ==
| Date | Time | Opponent | Site | TV | Result | Attendance |
|---|---|---|---|---|---|---|
| August 30 | 2:00 p.m | Robert Morris* | Milan Puskar Stadium; Morgantown, WV | ESPN+ | W 45–3 | 57,093 |
| September 6 | 4:00 p.m. | at Ohio* | Peden Stadium; Athens, OH | ESPNU | L 10–17 | 26,740 |
| September 13 | 3:30 p.m. | Pittsburgh* | Milan Puskar Stadium; Morgantown, WV (Backyard Brawl) | ESPN | W 31–24 ^{OT} | 62,108 |
| September 20 | 6:00 p.m. | at Kansas | David Booth Kansas Memorial Stadium; Lawrence, KS | FS1 | L 10–41 | 40,320 |
| September 27 | 3:30 p.m. | Utah | Milan Puskar Stadium; Morgantown, WV | FOX | L 14–48 | 53,965 |
| October 3 | 10:30 p.m. | at No. 23 BYU | LaVell Edwards Stadium; Provo, UT | ESPN | L 24–38 | 63,917 |
| October 18 | 1:00 p.m. | at UCF | Acrisure Bounce House; Orlando, FL | TNT/TruTV | L 13–45 | 43,445 |
| October 25 | 6:00 p.m. | TCU^{†} | Milan Puskar Stadium; Morgantown, WV | ESPN+ | L 17–23 | 54,110 |
| November 1 | 12:00 p.m. | at No. 22 Houston | TDECU Stadium; Houston, TX | FS1 | W 45–35 | 25,049 |
| November 8 | 12:00 p.m. | Colorado | Milan Puskar Stadium; Morgantown, WV | TNT/TruTV | W 29–22 | 55,510 |
| November 15 | 1:00 p.m. | at Arizona State | Mountain America Stadium; Tempe, AZ | TNT/TruTV | L 23–25 | 54,101 |
| November 29 | 12:00 p.m. | No. 5 Texas Tech | Milan Puskar Stadium; Morgantown, WV (True Blue) | ESPN | L 0–49 | 44,250 |
*Non-conference game; ^{†}Homecoming; Rankings from AP Poll (and CFP Rankings, after November 4) - Released prior to game; All times are in Eastern time

== Game summaries ==
=== vs Robert Morris ===
Robert Morris Colonials (FCS) (0–0) at West Virginia Mountaineers (0–0) – Game summary

| Quarter | 1 | 2 | 3 | 4 | Total |
|---|---|---|---|---|---|
| Colonials (FCS) | 0 | 3 | 0 | 0 | 3 |
| Mountaineers | 7 | 3 | 14 | 21 | 45 |

at Milan Puskar Stadium • Morgantown, West Virginia

- Date: August 30
- Game time: 2:00 p.m. EST
- Game weather:
- Game attendance: 57,093
- Referee: Kevin Boitmann
- TV announcers (ESPN+): Brian Custer (play-by-play) and Max Starks (analyst)

Game information

First quarter

- WVU – Nicco Marchiol 10-yard run (Kade Hensley kick), 10:15. Mountaineers 7–0. Drive: 10 plays, 83 yards, 3:22.

Second quarter

- WVU – Kade Hensley 27-yard field goal, 11:44. Mountaineers 10–0. Drive: 13 plays, 75 yards, 4:51.
- RMU – Jayson Jenkins 36-yard field goal, 3:08. Mountaineers 10–3. Drive: 5 plays, 18 yards, 1:43.

Third quarter

- WVU – Jahiem White 1-yard run (Kade Hensley kick), 11:21. Mountaineers 17–3. Drive: 9 plays, 64 yards, 3:33.
- WVU – Jahiem White 4-yard run (Kade Hensley kick), 5:21. Mountaineers 24–3. Drive: 3 plays, 24 yards, 0:51.

Fourth quarter

- WVU – Cam Vaughn 46-yard pass from Nicco Marchiol (Kade Hensley kick), 13:52. Mountaineers 31–3. Drive: 10 plays, 81 yards, 3:24.
- WVU – Cyncir Bowers 26-yard run (Kade Hensley kick), 10:16. Mountaineers 38–3. Drive: 4 plays, 54 yards, 1:51.
- WVU – Scotty Fox Jr. 59-yard run (Kade Hensley kick), 3:15. Mountaineers 45–3. Drive: 3 plays, 71 yards, 1:00.

| Statistics | RMU | WVU |
|---|---|---|
| First downs | 8 | 26 |
| Plays–yards | 59–123 | 76–625 |
| Rushes–yards | 37–53 | 53–393 |
| Passing yards | 70 | 232 |
| Passing: comp–att–int | 7–22–0 | 18–23–0 |
| Turnovers | 0 | 4 |
| Time of possession | 32:30 | 27:30 |

| Team | Category | Player | Statistics |
|---|---|---|---|
| Robert Morris | Passing | Zach Tanner | 7/21, 70 yards |
| Robert Morris | Rushing | Ethan Shine | 8 carries, 20 yards |
| Robert Morris | Receiving | Thomas Lee | 2 receptions, 22 yards |
| West Virginia | Passing | Nicco Marchiol | 17/20, 224 yards, TD |
| West Virginia | Rushing | Jahiem White | 18 carries, 93 yards, 2 TD |
| West Virginia | Receiving | Cam Vaughn | 7 receptions, 126 yards, TD |

=== at Ohio ===
West Virginia Mountaineers (1–0) at Ohio Bobcats (0–1) – Game summary

| Quarter | 1 | 2 | 3 | 4 | Total |
|---|---|---|---|---|---|
| Mountaineers | 7 | 0 | 3 | 0 | 10 |
| Bobcats | 3 | 14 | 0 | 0 | 17 |

at Peden Stadium • Athens, Ohio

- Date: September 6
- Game time: 4:00 p.m. EST
- Game weather: cloudy, Temperature:65 °F (18 °C),
- Game attendance: 26,740
- Referee: Michael VanderVelde (B12)
- TV announcers (ESPNU): Courtney Lyle (play-by-play) and Rene Ingoglia (analyst)

Game information

First quarter

- (03:22) WVU – Jahiem White 32-yard run (Kade Hensley kick) (6 plays, 89 yards, 02:11; WVU 7–0)
- (1:07) OHIO – Brack Peacock 37-yard field goal (6 plays, 60 yards, 02:10; WVU 7–3)

Second quarter

- (1:19) OHIO – Sieh Bangura 1-yard run (Brack Peacock kick) (12 plays, 71 yards, 06:00; OHIO 10–7)
- (04:58) OHIO – Chase Hendricks 31-yard pass from Parker Navarro (Brack Peacock kick) (Drive: 3 plays, 74 yards, 0:25; OHIO 17–7)

Third quarter

- (12:31) OHIO – Kade Hensley 38-yard field goal (7 plays, 51 yards, 02:24; OHIO 17–10)

Fourth quarter

- No scoring plays.

| Statistics | WVU | OHIO |
|---|---|---|
| First downs | 13 | 24 |
| Plays–yards | 56–250 | 79–429 |
| Rushes–yards | 28–72 | 48–182 |
| Passing yards | 178 | 247 |
| Passing: comp–att–int | 15–26–1 | 22–31–3 |
| Turnovers | 1 | 3 |
| Time of possession | 19:45 | 40:15 |

| Team | Category | Player | Statistics |
|---|---|---|---|
| West Virginia | Passing | Nicco Marchiol | 15/26, 178 yards, INT |
| West Virginia | Rushing | Jahiem White | 6 carries, 40 yards, TD |
| West Virginia | Receiving | Jaden Bray | 4 receptions, 69 yards |
| Ohio | Passing | Parker Navarro | 22/31, 237 yards, TD, 3 INT |
| Ohio | Rushing | Parker Navarro | 18 carries, 87 yards |
| Ohio | Receiving | Chase Hendricks | 9 receptions, 121 yards, TD |

=== vs Pittsburgh (Backyard Brawl) ===
Pittsburgh Panthers (2–0) at West Virginia Mountaineers (1–1) – Game summary

| Quarter | 1 | 2 | 3 | 4 | OT | Total |
|---|---|---|---|---|---|---|
| Panthers | 0 | 3 | 11 | 10 | 0 | 24 |
| Mountaineers | 0 | 7 | 7 | 10 | 7 | 31 |

at Milan Puskar Stadium • Morgantown, West Virginia

- Date: September 13
- Game time: 3:30 p.m. EST
- Game weather: Sunny, 81 degrees
- Game attendance: 62,108
- Referee: Justin Elliott
- TV announcers (ESPN): Mark Jones (play-by-play), Roddy Jones (analyst) and Quint Kessenich (sideline)

Game information

First quarter

- No scoring plays.

Second quarter

- WVU – Tye Edwards 12-yard run (Kade Hensley kick), 11:51. Mountaineers 7–0. Drive: 9 plays, 75 yards, 3:30.
- PITT – Trey Butkowski 23-yard field goal, 1:37. Mountaineers 7–3. Drive: 7 plays, 75 yards, 0:55.

Third quarter

- WVU – Tye Edwards 1-yard run (Kade Hensley kick), 8:27. Mountaineers 14–3. Drive: 7 plays, 80 yards, 3:08.
- PITT – Eli Holstein 1-yard run (Eli Holstein–Cataurus Hicks pass), 6:16. Mountaineers 14–11. Drive: 5 plays, 75 yards, 2:11.
- PITT – Trey Butkowski 46-yard field goal, 3:30. Tied 14–14. Drive: 4 plays, -14 yards, 1:59.

Fourth quarter

- PITT – Trey Butkowski 36-yard field goal, 14:56. Panthers 17–14. Drive: 4 plays, 6 yards, 2:27.
- PITT – Raphael Williams Jr. 14-yard pass from Eli Holstein (Trey Butkowski kick), 9:23. Panthers 24–14. Drive: 6 plays, 47 yards, 2:03.
- WVU – Kade Hensley 21-yard field goal, 5:03. Panthers 24–17. Drive: 12 plays, 72 yards, 4:20.
- WVU – Grayson Barnes 2-yard pass from Nicco Marchiol (Kade Hensley kick), 0:11. Tied 24–24. Drive: 13 plays, 87 yards, 2:36.

Overtime

- WVU – Tye Edwards 1-yard run (Kade Hensley kick). Mountaineers 31–24. Drive: 8 plays, 25 yards.

| Statistics | PITT | WVU |
|---|---|---|
| First downs | 15 | 28 |
| Plays–yards | 72–349 | 90–434 |
| Rushes–yards | 34–46 | 58–174 |
| Passing yards | 303 | 260 |
| Passing: comp–att–int | 22–38–1 | 22–32–2 |
| Turnovers | 1 | 2 |
| Time of possession | 28:59 | 31:01 |

| Team | Category | Player | Statistics |
|---|---|---|---|
| Pittsburgh | Passing | Eli Holstein | 22/37, 303 yards, TD, INT |
| Pittsburgh | Rushing | Juelz Goff | 8 carries, 37 yards |
| Pittsburgh | Receiving | Raphael Williams Jr. | 6 receptions, 119 yards, TD |
| West Virginia | Passing | Nicco Marchiol | 19/25, 192 yards, TD |
| West Virginia | Rushing | Tye Edwards | 25 carries, 141 yards, 3 TD |
| West Virginia | Receiving | Rodney Gallagher III | 7 receptions, 61 yards |

=== at Kansas ===
West Virginia Mountaineers (2–1) at Kansas Jayhawks (2–1) – Game summary

| Quarter | 1 | 2 | 3 | 4 | Total |
|---|---|---|---|---|---|
| Mountaineers | 0 | 3 | 0 | 7 | 10 |
| Jayhawks | 7 | 13 | 14 | 7 | 41 |

at David Booth Kansas Memorial Stadium • Lawrence, Kansas

- Date: September 20
- Game time: 6:00 p.m. EST
- Game weather: Sunny • Temperature: 82 °F (28 °C) • Wind: SW 8 mph
- Game attendance: 40,320
- Referee: Kevin Mar
- TV announcers (FS1): Noah Reed (play-by-play) and Robert Smith (analyst)

Game information

First quarter

- (11:57) KU: Levi Wentz 41-yard pass from Jalon Daniels (Laith Marjan kick). (Drive: 4 plays, 50 yards, 1:27; Kansas 7–0)

Second quarter

- (10:25) KU: Laith Marjan 42-yard field goal. (Drive: 10 plays, 38 yards, 4:35; Kansas 10–0)
- (3:43) WVU: Kade Hensley 26-yard field goal. (Drive: 9 plays, 49 yards, 3:20; Kansas 10–3)
- (2:11) KU: Leshon Williams 39-yard pass from Jalon Daniels (Laith Marjan kick). (Drive: 3 plays, 56 yards, 1:24; Kansas 17–3)
- (0:00) KU: Laith Marjan 44-yard field goal. (Drive: 7 plays, 38 yards, 0:40; Kansas 20–3)

Third quarter

- (14:48) KU: Emmanuel Henderson Jr. 94-yard kickoff return (Laith Marjan kick). (0:12; Kansas 27–3)
- (6:43) KU: Boden Green 7-yard pass from Jalon Daniels (Laith Marjan kick). (Drive: 12 plays, 69 yards, 7:00; Kansas 34–3)

Fourth quarter

- (14:31) WVU: Jaylen Henderson 13-yard run (Kade Hensley kick). (Drive: 11 plays, 95 yards, 4:08; Kansas 34–10)
- (12:52) KU: Leshon Williams 62-yard run (Laith Marjan kick). (Drive: 4 plays, 75 yards, 1:39; Kansas 41–10)

| Statistics | WVU | KU |
|---|---|---|
| First downs | 18 | 19 |
| Plays–yards | 72–323 | 65–405 |
| Rushes–yards | 41–181 | 39–259 |
| Passing yards | 142 | 146 |
| Passing: comp–att–int | 17–31–1 | 13–26–0 |
| Turnovers | 2 | 0 |
| Time of possession | 26:10 | 33:50 |

| Team | Category | Player | Statistics |
|---|---|---|---|
| West Virginia | Passing | Nicco Marchiol | 15/27, 126 yards, INT |
| West Virginia | Rushing | Jaylen Henderson | 7 carries, 79 yards, TD |
| West Virginia | Receiving | Cyncir Bowers | 2 receptions, 26 yards |
| Kansas | Passing | Jalon Daniels | 12/24, 138 yards, 3 TD |
| Kansas | Rushing | Leshon Williams | 19 carries, 129 yards, TD |
| Kansas | Receiving | Levi Wentz | 1 reception, 41 yards, TD |

=== vs Utah ===
Utah Utes (3–1) at West Virginia Mountaineers (2–2) – Game summary

| Quarter | 1 | 2 | 3 | 4 | Total |
|---|---|---|---|---|---|
| Utes | 14 | 14 | 10 | 10 | 48 |
| Mountaineers | 0 | 0 | 7 | 7 | 14 |

at Milan Puskar Stadium • Morgantown, West Virginia

- Date: September 27
- Game time: 3:30 p.m. EST
- Game weather: Rain, 69 degrees
- Game attendance: 53,965
- Referee: Stephen Baron
- TV announcers (FOX): Jason Benetti (play-by-play), Robert Griffin III (analyst) and Alexa Landestoy (sideline)

Game information

First quarter

- (7:16) UTAH – JJ Buchanan 7-yard pass from Devon Dampier, Dillon Curtis kick (Drive: 12 plays, 73 yards, 4:40; Utah 7–0)
- (1:33) UTAH – Devon Dampier 7-yard run, Dillon Curtis kick (Drive: 11 plays, 65 yards, 4:43; Utah 14–0)

Second quarter

- (11:32) UTAH – Ryan Davis 32-yard pass from Devon Dampier, Dillon Curtis kick (Drive: 6 plays, 58 yards, 2:43; Utah 21–0)
- (0:13) UTAH – Dallen Bentley 2-yard pass from Devon Dampier, Dillon Curtis kick (Drive: 15 plays, 94 yards, 4:43; Utah 28–0)

Third quarter

- (10:42) UTAH – Wayshawn Parker 11-yard pass from Devon Dampier, Dillon Curtis kick (Drive: 10 plays, 63 yards, 4:15; Utah 35–0)
- (7:28) WVU – Cam Vaughn 39-yard pass from Khalil Wilkins, Kade Hensley kick (Drive: 8 plays, 75 yards, 3:14; Utah 35–7)
- (5:18) UTAH – Dillon Curtis 33-yard field goal (Drive: 5 plays, 60 yards, 2:10; Utah 38–7)

Fourth quarter

- (10:46) UTAH – Dillon Curtis 33-yard field goal (Drive: 9 plays, 61 yards, 5:28; Utah 41–7)
- (7:59) WVU – Diore Hubbard 1-yard run, Kade Hensley kick (Drive: 5 plays, 75 yards, 2:47; Utah 41–14)
- (1:56) UTAH – Bryce Duke 2-yard pass from Byrd Ficklin, Dillon Curtis kick (Drive: 10 plays, 75 yards, 6:03; Utah 48–14)

| Statistics | UTAH | WVU |
|---|---|---|
| First downs | 33 | 14 |
| Plays–yards | 79-532 | 61-346 |
| Rushes–yards | 47-242 | 48-261 |
| Passing yards | 290 | 85 |
| Passing: comp–att–int | 25-30-1 | 6-13-0 |
| Turnovers | 1 | 0 |
| Time of possession | 34:45 | 25:15 |

| Team | Category | Player | Statistics |
|---|---|---|---|
| Utah | Passing | Devon Dampier | 21/26, 237 yards, 4 TD, INT |
| Utah | Rushing | Wayshawn Parker | 9 carries, 66 yards |
| Utah | Receiving | Ryan Davis | 7 receptions, 107 yards, TD |
| West Virginia | Passing | Khalil Wilkins | 3/6, 63 yards, TD |
| West Virginia | Rushing | Jarod Bowie | 1 carry, 68 yards |
| West Virginia | Receiving | Cam Vaughn | 3 receptions, 62 yards, TD |

=== at No. 23 BYU ===
West Virginia Mountaineers (2–3) at No. 23 BYU Cougars (4–0) – Game summary

| Quarter | 1 | 2 | 3 | 4 | Total |
|---|---|---|---|---|---|
| Mountaineers | 0 | 10 | 7 | 7 | 24 |
| No. 23 Cougars | 14 | 14 | 3 | 7 | 38 |

at LaVell Edwards Stadium • Provo, Utah

- Date: October 3
- Game time: 10:30 p.m.
- Game weather: Cloudy with showers on and off, 68 °F (20 °C), Winds 3mph NW
- Game attendance: 63,917
- Referee: David Alvarez
- TV announcers (ESPN): Anish Shroff (play-by-play), Andre Ware (analyst), and Paul Carcaterra (sideline)

Game information

First quarter

- BYU – 9:14 Parker Kingston 1-yard run, Will Ferrin kick. BYU 7–0 Drive: 1 play, 1 yard, 0:05
- BYU – 3:41 Parker Kingston 54-yard pass from Bear Bachmeier, Will Ferrin kick. BYU 14–0 Drive: 3 plays, 57 yards, 1:16

Second quarter

- WVU – 14:15 Kade Hensley 45-yd Field Goal. BYU 14–3 Drive: 9 plays, 48 yards, 4:26
- BYU – 5:17 LJ Martin 4-yard run, Will Ferrin kick. BYU 21–3 Drive: 2 plays, 89 yards, 0:54
- WVU – 1:58 Diore Hubbard 3-yard run, Kade Hensley kick. BYU 21–10 Drive: 1 play, 3 yards, 0:04
- BYU – 0:19 Bear Bachmeier 2-yard run, Will Ferrin kick. BYU 28–10 Drive: 9 plays, 73 yards, 1:31

Third quarter

- BYU – 6:53 Will Ferrin 37-yard Field Goal. BYU 31–10 Drive: 15 plays, 55 yards, 7:59
- WVU – 0:37 Khalil Wilkins 6-yard run, Kade Hensley kick. BYU 31–17 Drive: 5 plays, 22 yards, 1:55

Fourth quarter

- BYU – 8:50 LJ Martin 1-yard run, Will Ferrin kick. BYU 38–17 Drive: 12 plays, 75 yards, 6:42
- WVU – 1:14 Cam Vaughn 29-yard pass from Scotty Fox Jr., Kade Hensley kick. BYU 38–24 Drive: 3 plays, 54 yards, 0:36

| Statistics | WVU | BYU |
|---|---|---|
| First downs | 18 | 22 |
| Plays–yards | 65–291 | 67–516 |
| Rushes–yards | 47–156 | 42–165 |
| Passing yards | 135 | 351 |
| Passing: comp–att–int | 10–18–2 | 18–25–1 |
| Turnovers | 2 | 3 |
| Time of possession | 27:50 | 32:10 |

| Team | Category | Player | Statistics |
|---|---|---|---|
| West Virginia | Passing | Khalil Wilkins | 7/15, 81 yards, 2 INT |
| West Virginia | Rushing | Khalil Wilkins | 23 carries, 89 yards, TD |
| West Virginia | Receiving | Cam Vaughn | 2 receptions, 43 yards, TD |
| BYU | Passing | Bear Bachmeier | 18/25, 351 yards, TD, INT |
| BYU | Rushing | LJ Martin | 21 carries, 90 yards, 2 TD |
| BYU | Receiving | Chase Roberts | 4 receptions, 161 yards |

=== at UCF ===
West Virginia Mountaineers (2–4) at UCF Knights (3–3) – Game summary

| Quarter | 1 | 2 | 3 | 4 | Total |
|---|---|---|---|---|---|
| Mountaineers | 0 | 7 | 0 | 6 | 13 |
| Knights | 14 | 0 | 21 | 10 | 45 |

at Acrisure Bounce House • Orlando, Florida

- Date: October 18
- Game time: 1:00 p.m.
- Game weather: 79 °F (26 °C), sunny
- Game attendance: 43,445
- Referee: Tutashinda Salaam
- TV announcers (TNT/TruTV): J.B. Long (play-by-play), Mike Golic Jr. (analyst), and Lauren Jbara (sideline)

Game information

First quarter

- UCF – Chris Domercant 40-yard pass from Tayven Jackson (Noe Ruelas kick), 11:33, Knights 7–0. Drive: 6 plays, 97 yards, 1:45.
- UCF – Chris Domercant 34-yard pass from Tayven Jackson (Noe Ruelas kick), 4:54, Knights 14–0. Drive: 7 plays, 68 yards, 3:07.

Second quarter

- WVU – Khalil Wilkins 6-yard run (Kade Hensley kick), 14:19, Knights 14–7. Drive: 5 plays, 39 yards, 1:36.

Third quarter

- UCF – Jaden Nixon 12-yard run (Noe Ruelas kick), 11:53, Knights 21–7. Drive: 9 plays, 92 yards, 3:02.
- UCF – Keli Lawson 32-yard fumble return (Noe Ruelas kick), 10:40, Knights 28–7.
- UCF – Jaden Nixon 83-yard run (Noe Ruelas kick), 2:12, Knights 35–7. Drive: 2 plays, 85 yards, 0:49.

Fourth quarter

- UCF – Noe Ruelas 51-yard field goal, 9:40, Knights 38–7. Drive: 4 plays, -1 yard, 1:22.
- UCF – Davi Belfort 10-yard run (Noe Ruelas kick), 4:17, Knights 45–7. Drive: 10 plays, 72 yards, 4:42.
- WVU – Diore Hubbard 1-yard run (kick failed), 1:46, Knights 45–13. Drive: 3 plays, 1 yard, 0:35.

| Statistics | WVU | UCF |
|---|---|---|
| First downs | 19 | 21 |
| Plays–yards | 77–210 | 75–578 |
| Rushes–yards | 49–131 | 35–255 |
| Passing yards | 79 | 323 |
| Passing: comp–att–int | 11–28–0 | 26–40–2 |
| Turnovers | 1 | 2 |
| Time of possession | 26:53 | 33:07 |

| Team | Category | Player | Statistics |
|---|---|---|---|
| West Virginia | Passing | Scotty Fox Jr. | 6/17, 47 yards |
| West Virginia | Rushing | Khalil Wilkins | 15 carries, 48 yards, TD |
| West Virginia | Receiving | Justin Smith-Brown | 2 receptions, 27 yards |
| UCF | Passing | Tayven Jackson | 23/34, 2 TD, INT |
| UCF | Rushing | Jaden Nixon | 7 carries, 116 yards, 2 TD |
| UCF | Receiving | Chris Domercant | 5 receptions, 89 yards, 2 TD |

=== vs TCU ===
TCU Horned Frogs (5–2) at West Virginia Mountaineers (2–5) – Game summary

| Quarter | 1 | 2 | 3 | 4 | Total |
|---|---|---|---|---|---|
| Horned Frogs | 10 | 10 | 0 | 3 | 23 |
| Mountaineers | 0 | 7 | 3 | 7 | 17 |

at Milan Puskar Stadium • Morgantown, West Virginia

- Date: October 25
- Game time: 7:00 p.m.
- Game weather: Cloudy • Temperature: 53 °F (12 °C) • Wind: NE 1 mph
- Game attendance: 54,110
- Referee: Kevin Mar
- TV announcers (ESPN+): Pete Sousa (play-by-play) and Craig Haubert (sideline)

Game information

First quarter

- (11:35) TCU – Nate McCashland 35-yard field goal (Drive: 5 plays, 31 yards, 2:11; TCU 3–0)
- (4:31) TCU – Trent Battle 1-yard run, Nate McCashland kick (Drive: 7 plays, 48 yards, 3:12; TCU 10–0)

Second quarter

- (11:50) WVU – Grayson Barnes 17-yard pass from Scotty Fox Jr., Kade Hensley kick (Drive: 4 plays, 35 yards, 1:37; TCU 10–7)
- (6:12) TCU – Eric McAlister 4-yard pass from Josh Hoover, Nate McCashland kick (Drive: 11 plays, 70 yards, 5:38; TCU 17–7)
- (0:59) TCU – Nate McCashland 22-yard field goal (Drive: 7 plays, 53 yards, 1:58; TCU 20–7)

Third quarter

- (1:20) WVU – Kade Hensley 28-yard field goal (Drive: 10 plays, 60 yards, 3:45; TCU 20–10)

Fourth quarter

- (4:48) TCU – Nate McCashland 41-yard field goal (Drive: 13 plays, 38 yards, 6:50; TCU 23–10)
- (3:15) WVU – Jeff Weimer 28-yard pass from Scotty Fox Jr., Kade Hensley kick (Drive: 7 plays, 75 yards, 1:33; TCU 23–17)

| Statistics | TCU | WVU |
|---|---|---|
| First downs | 19 | 19 |
| Plays–yards | 72–343 | 73–342 |
| Rushes–yards | 33–96 | 32–41 |
| Passing yards | 247 | 301 |
| Passing: comp–att–int | 24–39–0 | 28–41–0 |
| Turnovers | 0 | 0 |
| Time of possession | 34:03 | 25:57 |

| Team | Category | Player | Statistics |
|---|---|---|---|
| TCU | Passing | Josh Hoover | 24/39, 247 yards, TD |
| TCU | Rushing | Trent Battle | 19 carries, 89 yards, TD |
| TCU | Receiving | Eric McAlister | 9 receptions, 124 yards, TD |
| West Virginia | Passing | Scotty Fox Jr. | 28/41, 301 yards, 2 TD |
| West Virginia | Rushing | Diore Hubbard | 14 carries, 32 yards |
| West Virginia | Receiving | Cam Vaughn | 6 receptions, 85 yards |

=== at No. 22 Houston ===
West Virginia Mountaineers (2–6) at No. 22 Houston Cougars (7–1) – Game summary

| Quarter | 1 | 2 | 3 | 4 | Total |
|---|---|---|---|---|---|
| Mountaineers | 14 | 7 | 10 | 14 | 45 |
| No. 22 Cougars | 7 | 14 | 7 | 7 | 35 |

at TDECU Stadium • Houston, Texas

- Date: November 1
- Game time: 12:00 p.m.
- Game weather: Cloudy, 67 degrees
- Game attendance: 25,049
- Referee: David Alvarez
- TV announcers (FS1): Connor Onion (play-by-play) and Mark Helfrich (analyst)

Game information

First quarter

- (10:31) WVU - Scotty Fox Jr. 6-yard run, Kade Hensley kick (Drive: 12 plays, 75 yards, 4:29; Mountaineers 7-0)
- (4:03) WVU - Cyncir Bowers 21-yard run, Kade Hensley kick (Drive: 10 plays, 89 yards, 4:15; Mountaineers 14-0)
- (0:58) HOU - Tanner Koziol 3-yard pass from Conner Weigman, Ethan Sanchez kick (Drive: 7 plays, 75 yards, 3:05; Mountaineers 14-7)

Second quarter

- (12:54) WVU - Cam Vaughn 24-yard pass from Scotty Fox Jr., Kade Hensley kick (Drive: 2 plays, 27 yards, 0:35; Mountaineers 21-7)
- (8:49) HOU - Conner Weigman 1-yard run, Ethan Sanchez kick (Drive: 8 plays, 75 yards, 4:05; Mountaineers 21-14)
- (3:03) HOU - Amare Thomas 9-yard pass from Conner Weigman, Ethan Sanchez kick (Drive: 5 plays, 47 yards, 2:01; Tied 21-21)

Third quarter

- (12:14) WVU - Kade Hensley 50-yard field goal (Drive: 6 plays, 15 yards, 1:59; Mountaineers 24-21)
- (6:33) WVU - Jordan Scruggs 80-yard interception return, Kade Hensley kick (Drive: 5 plays, 33 yards, 2:35; Mountaineers 31-21)
- (1:16) HOU - Amare Thomas 8-yard pass from Conner Weigman, Ethan Sanchez kick (Drive: 12 plays, 75 yards, 5:17; Mountaineers 31-28)

Fourth quarter

- (12:54) WVU - Scotty Fox Jr. 34-yard run, Kade Hensley kick (Drive: 8 plays, 73 yards, 3:17; Mountaineers 38-28)
- (7:15) WVU - Diore Hubbard 11-yard run, Kade Hensley kick (Drive: 7 plays, 71 yards, 3:26; Mountaineers 45-28)
- (6:24) HOU - Amare Thomas 27-yard pass from Conner Weigman, Ethan Sanchez kick (Drive: 4 plays, 68 yards, 0:45; Mountaineers 45-35)

| Statistics | WVU | HOU |
|---|---|---|
| First downs | 20 | 26 |
| Plays–yards | 76-403 | 67-400 |
| Rushes–yards | 53-246 | 31-82 |
| Passing yards | 157 | 318 |
| Passing: comp–att–int | 13-22-0 | 26-36-2 |
| Turnovers | 0 | 4 |
| Time of possession | 30:29 | 29:31 |

| Team | Category | Player | Statistics |
|---|---|---|---|
| West Virginia | Passing | Scotty Fox Jr. | 13/22, 157 yards, TD |
| West Virginia | Rushing | Diore Hubbard | 29 carries, 108 yards, TD |
| West Virginia | Receiving | Jeff Weimer | 3 receptions, 67 yards |
| Houston | Passing | Conner Weigman | 25/35, 309 yards, 4 TD, 2 INT |
| Houston | Rushing | Dean Connors | 13 carries, 71 yards |
| Houston | Receiving | Amare Thomas | 10 receptions, 99 yards, 3 TD |

=== vs Colorado ===
Colorado Buffaloes (3-6) at West Virginia Mountaineers (3-6) – Game summary

| Quarter | 1 | 2 | 3 | 4 | Total |
|---|---|---|---|---|---|
| Buffaloes | 0 | 9 | 7 | 6 | 22 |
| Mountaineers | 9 | 10 | 3 | 7 | 29 |

at Milan Puskar Stadium • Morgantown, West Virginia

- Date: November 8
- Game time: 12:00 p.m EST
- Game weather: Sunny • Temperature: 60 °F (16 °C) • Wind: SW at 10 miles per hour (16 km/h)
- Game attendance: 55,510
- Referee: Mike McCabe
- TV announcers (TNT/truTV): J.B. Long (play-by-play), Mike Golic Jr. (analyst) and Jared Greenberg (sideline)

Game information

First quarter

- (4:35) WVU – Team safety (West Virginia 2–0)
- (0:19) WVU – Curtis Jones Jr. 2-yard run, Kade Hensley kick (Drive: 11 plays, 75 yards, 4:10; West Virginia 9–0)

Second quarter

- (06:02) COL – Alejandro Mata 23-yard field goal (Drive: 13 plays, 70 yards, 5:03; West Virginia 9–3)
- (3:29) WVU – Ryan Ward 3-yard pass from Scotty Fox Jr., Kade Hensley kick (Drive: 6 plays, 75 yards, 2:33; West Virginia 16–3)
- (0:45) COL – Joseph Williams 9-yard pass from Julian Lewis (Drive: 6 plays, 77 yards, 2:36; West Virginia 16–9)
- (0:00) WVU – Kade Hensley 41-yard field goal (Drive: 6 plays, 52 yards, 0:45; West Virginia 19–9)

Third quarter

- (07:19) COL – Omarion Miller 23-yard pass from Julian Lewis, Alejandro Mata kick (Drive: 2 plays, 20 yards, 0:47; West Virginia 19–16)
- (1:47) WVU – Kade Hensley 37-yard field goal (Drive: 15 plays, 56 yards, 5:32; West Virginia 22–16)

Fourth quarter

- (14:51) COL – Alejandro Mata 35-yard field goal (Drive: 6 plays, 53 yards, 1:49; West Virginia 22–19)
- (4:15) WVU – Curtis Jones Jr. 4-yard run, Kade Hensley kick (Drive: 10 plays, 57 yards, 5:33; West Virginia 29–19)
- (1:16) COL – Alejandro Mata 38-yard field goal (Drive: 13 plays, 55 yards, 2:57; West Virginia 29–19)

| Statistics | COLO | WVU |
|---|---|---|
| First downs | 19 | 21 |
| Plays–yards | 73–350 | 81–369 |
| Rushes–yards | 38–51 | 53–167 |
| Passing yards | 299 | 202 |
| Passing: Comp–Att–Int | 22–35–0 | 17–28–2 |
| Turnovers | 1 | 3 |
| Time of possession | 29:24 | 30:36 |

| Team | Category | Player | Statistics |
|---|---|---|---|
| Colorado | Passing | Julian Lewis | 22/35, 299 yards, 2 TD |
| Colorado | Rushing | Dre'lon Miller | 10 carries, 42 yards |
| Colorado | Receiving | Omarion Miller | 6 receptions, 131 yards, TD |
| West Virginia | Passing | Scotty Fox Jr. | 17/28, 202 yards, TD, 2 INT |
| West Virginia | Rushing | Scotty Fox Jr. | 17 carries, 58 yards |
| West Virginia | Receiving | Diore Hubbard | 6 receptions, 94 yards |

=== at Arizona State ===
West Virginia Mountaineers (4–6) at Arizona State Sun Devils (6–3) – Game summary

| Quarter | 1 | 2 | 3 | 4 | Total |
|---|---|---|---|---|---|
| Mountaineers | 3 | 7 | 0 | 13 | 23 |
| Sun Devils | 0 | 22 | 0 | 3 | 25 |

at Mountain America Stadium • Tempe, Arizona

- Date: November 15
- Game time: 1:00 p.m.
- Game weather:
- Game attendance: 54,101
- Referee: Steven Heiman
- TV announcers (TNT/HBO Max): J.B. Long (play-by-play), Mike Golic Jr. (analyst) and Coy Wire (sideline)

Game information

First quarter

- WVU – Kade Hensley 29-yard field goal, 8:41. Mountaineers 3–0. Drive: 11 plays, 57 yards, 4:25.

Second quarter

- ASU – Chamon Metayer 6-yard pass from Jeff Sims (Jesus Gomez kick), 11:17. Sun Devils 7–3. Drive: 10 plays, 94 yards, 5:09.
- ASU – Derek Eusebio 19-yard pass from Jeff Sims (Jesus Gomez–Cameron Harpole pass), 8:04. Sun Devils 15–3. Drive: 4 plays, 40 yards, 1:48.
- WVU – Jeff Weimer 75-yard pass from Scotty Fox Jr. (Kade Hensley kick), 7:53. Sun Devils 15–10. Drive: 1 play, 75 yards, 0:11.
- ASU – Raleek Brown 33-yard pass from Jeff Sims (Jesus Gomez kick), 1:41. Sun Devils 22–10. Drive: 8 plays, 69 yards, 2:49.

Third quarter

- No scoring plays.

Fourth quarter

- WVU – Curtis Jones Jr. 1-yard run (Kade Hensley kick), 10:41. Sun Devils 22–17. Drive: 10 plays, 72 yards, 3:26.
- WVU – Cyncir Bowers 90-yard pass from Scotty Fox Jr. (run failed), 6:37. Mountaineers 23–22. Drive: 3 plays, 73 yards, 1:29.
- ASU – Jesus Gomez 49-yard field goal, 2:44. Sun Devils 25–23. Drive: 8 plays, 40 yards, 3:47.

| Statistics | WVU | ASU |
|---|---|---|
| First downs | 20 | 18 |
| Plays–yards | 70–421 | 67–330 |
| Rushes–yards | 39–68 | 39–123 |
| Passing yards | 353 | 207 |
| Passing: comp–att–int | 19–31–1 | 19–28–0 |
| Turnovers | 1 | 1 |
| Time of possession | 27:26 | 32:34 |

| Team | Category | Player | Statistics |
|---|---|---|---|
| West Virginia | Passing | Scotty Fox Jr. | 19/31, 353 yards, 2 TD, INT |
| West Virginia | Rushing | Cyncir Bowers | 13 carries, 42 yards |
| West Virginia | Receiving | Jeff Weimer | 3 receptions, 90 yards, TD |
| Arizona State | Passing | Jeff Sims | 19/28, 207 yards, 3 TD |
| Arizona State | Rushing | Jeff Sims | 17 carries, 81 yards |
| Arizona State | Receiving | Derek Eusebio | 6 receptions, 74 yards, TD |

=== vs No. 5 Texas Tech ===
No. 5 Texas Tech Red Raiders (10–1) at West Virginia Mountaineers (4–7) – Game summary

| Quarter | 1 | 2 | 3 | 4 | Total |
|---|---|---|---|---|---|
| No. 5 Red Raiders | 21 | 7 | 14 | 7 | 49 |
| Mountaineers | 0 | 0 | 0 | 0 | 0 |

at Milan Puskar Stadium • Morgantown, West Virginia

- Date: November 29
- Game time: 12:00 p.m. EST
- Game weather: Sunny, 35 °F (2 °C)
- Game attendance: 44,250
- Referee: Stephen Baron
- TV announcers (ESPN): Roy Philpott (play-by-play), Sam Acho (analyst) and Taylor Davis (sideline)

Game information

First quarter

- TTU – Jacob Rodriguez 1-yard run (Stone Harrington kick), 11:17. Red Raiders 7–0. Drive: 8 plays, 57 yards, 2:27.
- TTU – Cameron Dickey 4-yard pass from Behren Morton (Stone Harrington kick), 3:03. Red Raiders 14–0. Drive: 16 plays, 83 yards, 6:23.
- TTU – Caleb Douglas 19-yard pass from Behren Morton (Stone Harrington kick), 0:13. Red Raiders 21–0. Drive: 4 plays, 33 yards, 1:38.

Second quarter

- TTU – Caleb Douglas 4-yard pass from Behren Morton (Stone Harrington kick), 6:49. Red Raiders 28–0. Drive: 11 plays, 73 yards, 4:42.

Third quarter

- TTU – J'Koby Williams 9-yard run (Stone Harrington kick), 12:52. Red Raiders 35–0. Drive: 5 plays, 74 yards, 2:03.
- TTU – Micah Hudson 15-yard pass from Lloyd Jones III (Stone Harrington kick), 4:20. Red Raiders 42–0. Drive: 3 plays, 18 yards, 1:23.

Fourth quarter

- TTU – Micah Hudson 30-yard pass from Lloyd Jones III (Ian Hershey kick), 13:33. Red Raiders 49–0. Drive: 9 plays, 74 yards, 4:21.

| Statistics | TTU | WVU |
|---|---|---|
| First downs | 32 | 9 |
| Plays–yards | 94–572 | 54–180 |
| Rushes–yards | 54–188 | 22–37 |
| Passing yards | 384 | 143 |
| Passing: comp–att–int | 29–40–1 | 16–32–2 |
| Turnovers | 2 | 2 |
| Time of possession | 40:00 | 20:00 |

| Team | Category | Player | Statistics |
|---|---|---|---|
| Texas Tech | Passing | Behren Morton | 25/32, 310 yards, 3 TD |
| Texas Tech | Rushing | Cameron Dickey | 12 carries, 79 yards |
| Texas Tech | Receiving | Caleb Douglas | 5 receptions, 127 yards, 2 TD |
| West Virginia | Passing | Scotty Fox Jr. | 13/23, 98 yards, INT |
| West Virginia | Rushing | Armoni Weaver | 1 carry, 29 yards |
| West Virginia | Receiving | Jeff Weimer | 6 receptions, 77 yards |

== Personnel ==
=== Coaching staff ===
| Coach | Title | Year at West Virginia | Previous job |
|---|---|---|---|
| Rich Rodriguez | Head coach | 8th | Jacksonville State |
| Zac Alley | Assistant head coach/DC/LB | 1st | Oklahoma (DC/LB) |
| Jack Bicknell Jr. | OL Coach | 1st | Wisconsin (OL) |
| Gabe Franklin | Safeties Coach | 1st | Boise State (S) |
| Ryan Garrett | Wide Receivers Coach | 1st | Jacksonville State (WR) |
| Michael Nysewander | Tight Ends Coach | 1st | Jacksonville State (TE) |
| William Green | Defensive Line Coach | 1st | Jacksonville State (DL) |
| Pat Kirkland | Special Teams Coordinator | 5th | Old Dominion (DL) |
| Rhett Rodriguez | QB Coach | 1st | Jacksonville State (OA) |
| Pat White | Assistant QB Coach/Assistant to the Head Coach | 1st | Campbell (QB) |
| Noel Devine | Offensive Analyst/Assistant RB Coach | 1st | N/A |

=== Transfers ===
==== Incoming ====
| Name | Pos. | Height | Weight | Hometown | Prev. school |
|---|---|---|---|---|---|
| Jarod Bowie | WR | 5'9" | 160 lbs | Martinsburg, WV | Jacksonville State |
| Jacob Barrick | TE | 6'3" | 235 lbs | Martinsburg, WV | Jacksonville State |
| Cam Vaughn | WR | 6'2" | 190 lbs | Temple, GA | Jacksonville State |
| Fred Perry | S | 5'11" | 200 lbs | Warner Robins, GA | Jacksonville State |
| Derek Carter | DB | 5'9" | 160 lbs | Gardendale, AL | Jacksonville State |
| Oran Singleton | WR | 5'9" | 164 lbs | Clewiston, FL | Eastern Michigan |
| Walter Young Bear | OL | 6'3" | 312 lbs | Norman, OK | Tulsa |
| Jordan Scruggs | DB | 5'11" | 176 lbs | Kansas City, MO | South Alabama |
| Michael Coats Jr. | DB | 5'10" | 173 lbs | Biloxi, MS | Nevada |
| Jaylen Henderson | QB | 6'3" | 205 lbs | West Hills, CA | Texas A&M |
| Johnny Pascuzzi | TE | 6'4" | 242 lbs | Kansas City, MO | Iowa |
| Cyrus Traugh | WR | 6'0" | 180 lbs | Parkersburg, WV | Youngstown State |
| Ashton Woods | LB | 6'3" | 205 lbs | Marietta, GA | North Carolina |
| Ethan Head | PK | 6'1" | 175 lbs | West Chicago, IL | Tulane |
| Jordan Walker | S | 6'0" | 175 lbs | Lafayette, AL | Chattanooga |
| Kimo Makaneole | DL | 6'4" | 285 lbs | Niceville, FL | LSU |
| Tye Edwards | RB | 6'3" | 212 lbs | Saint Augustine, FL | Northern Iowa |
| Justin Harrington | S | 6'3" | 214 lbs | Raleigh, NC | Washington |
| Chase Wilson | LB | 6'2" | 200 lbs | Arvada, CO | Colorado State |
| Braden Siders | EDGE | 6'2" | 252 lbs | Arvada, CO | Wyoming |
| Wyatt Minor | IOL | 6'5" | 315 lbs | Clarksburg, WV | Youngstown State |
| William Davis | S | 5'10" | 195 lbs | South Boston, VA | Virginia Union |
| Robby Martin | IOL | 6'3" | 285 lbs | Huntington, WV | NC State |
| Devonte Golden-Nelson | CB | 5'11" | 177 lbs | Memphis, TN | Akron |
| Ty'kieast Crawford | OT | 6'4" | 320 lbs | Carthage, TX | Arkansas |
| Max Brown | QB | 6'3" | 200 lbs | Tulsa, OK | Charlotte |
| Jimmori Robinson | EDGE | 6'6" | 248 lbs | Alexandria, VA | UTSA |
| William Reed | OT | 6'6" | 280 lbs | Sammamish, WA | Princeton |
| Jeffrey Weimer | WR | 6'2" | 205 lbs | San Francisco, CA | Idaho State |
| Jason Chambers | CB | 6'0" | 185 lbs | Charlotte, NC | Appalachian State |
| LJ Turner | RB | 5'9" | 195 lbs | Palm Bay, FL | Catawba |
| Grayson Barnes | TE | 6'5" | 215 lbs | Sacramento, CA | Northern Illinois |
| Oluwaseyi Omotosho | DL | 6'2" | 246 lbs | Richmond, TX | Oregon State |

==== Outgoing ====
| Name | Pos. | Height | Weight | Hometown | New school |
|---|---|---|---|---|---|
| Josiah Jackson | CB | 6'0" | 177 lbs | Fairfield, OH | Garden City CC |
| Bryce Biggs | IOL | 6'6" | 270 lbs | Huntington, WV | Marshall |
| Raleigh Collins III | S | 6'3" | 185 lbs | Philadelphia, PA | New Hampshire |
| Dom Collins | WR | 5'9" | 167 lbs | Princeton, WV | Concord |
| Will Dixon | TE | 6'5" | 244 lbs | Hillsborough, NJ | Rhode Island |
| Tyler Evans | WR | 5'11" | 183 lbs | Youngstown, OH | Robert Morris |
| T.J. Crandall | CB | 6'1" | 185 lbs | Sammamish, WA | Oregon State |
| Harry Hilvert | DL | 6'2" | 255 lbs | North Bend, OH | Thomas More |
| Josiah Trotter | LB | 6'2" | 225 lbs | Philadelphia, PA | Missouri |
| Jaylen Anderson | RB | 6'0" | 205 lbs | Perry, OH | TBA |
| Sullivan Weidman | IOL | 6'6" | 300 lbs | Brookline, MA | UMass |
| Tomas Rimac | OL | 6'6" | 305 lbs | Brunswick, OH | Virginia Tech |
| Aiden Ellis | IOL | 6'4" | 290 lbs | Charleston, WV | Mercyhurst |
| Jack Sammarco | TE | 6'5" | 238 lbs | Cincinnati, OH | Alabama |
| DayDay Farmer | WR | 5'11" | 160 lbs | Melbourne, FL | UCF |
| Derek Berlitz | DL | 6'3" | 250 lbs | Catawissa, PA | Central Connecticut |
| CJ Donaldson | RB | 6'1" | 240 lbs | Miami, FL | Ohio State |
| Ayden Garnes | CB | 6'0" | 162 lbs | Drexel Hill, PA | Arizona |
| Johnny Williams IV | OT | 6'6" | 300 lbs | Macon, GA | Missouri |
| Ryder Burton | QB | 6'1" | 182 lbs | Springville, UT | UAB |
| Trey Lathan | LB | 6'1" | 208 lbs | Miami, FL | Kansas |
| Hudson Clement | WR | 6'1" | 190 lbs | Martinsburg, WV | Illinois |
| Jaheem Joseph | S | 5'11" | 170 lbs | Opa Locka, FL | UNLV |
| Donovan Grayson | DL | 6'4" | 238 lbs | Stafford, VA | Samford |
| Traylon Ray | WR | 6'3" | 180 lbs | Tallahassee, FL | Ole Miss |
| Kyle Altuner | IOL | 6'3" | 285 lbs | Olney, MD | Virginia Tech |
| Lucas Austin | OT | 6'7" | 265 lbs | Sterling, IL | Virginia Tech |
| Ak'Bar Shabazz II | CB | 6'0" | 170 lbs | Kennesaw, GA | TBA |
| Justin Terry | OT | 6'5" | 315 lbs | Pickerington, OH | Withdrawn |
| Murphy Clement | RB | 6'2" | 200 lbs | Martinsburg, WV | Illinois |
| Zeiqui Lawton | EDGE | 6'3" | 240 lbs | Charleston, WV | Sam Houston |
| Zachariah Keith | DL | 6'5" | 250 lbs | Douglasville, GA | Southern Miss |
