= Hykeem Williams =

American football player (born 2003)

No. 5 – Colorado Buffaloes
- Position: Wide receiver
- Class: Senior

Personal information
- Born: November 18, 2003 (age 22); Fort Lauderdale, Florida, U.S.
- Listed height: 6 ft 2 in (1.88 m)
- Listed weight: 220 lb (100 kg)

Career information
- High school: Stranahan (Fort Lauderdale, Florida)
- College: Florida State (2023–2024); Colorado (2025–present)
- Stats at ESPN

Hykeem Williams (born November 18, 2003) is an American college football wide receiver for the Colorado Buffaloes. He previously played for Florida State Seminoles.

== Early life ==
Williams grew up in Fort Lauderdale, Florida, and attended Stranahan High School. He played at the wide receiver position for the school's football team. As a junior, he tallied 40 receptions for 750 yards and 11 touchdowns and was selected by the Miami Herald as the Broward County Athlete of the Year for the 2020–21 school year. He was rated as a five-star recruit and one of the best players in the 2023 college football recruiting class, ranked at No. 17 by Rivals.com and No. 24 by ESPN.com. He was also rated as the No. 3 wide receiver in the class by ESPN and No. 4 by Rivals.com.

== College career ==
=== Florida State ===
Williams committed to Florida State on September 23, 2022. He was considered the "crown jewel" in Florida State's 2023 recruiting class and was the school's first five-star recruit since 2017.

Williams enrolled early at Florida State in January 2023. Carter Karels of the Tallahassee Democrat described his "freakish athleticism and playmaking ability." He scored his first college catch against Southern Miss. Against Syracuse on October 14, he caught his first touchdown pass, a 44-yard reception.

=== Colorado ===
On April 29, 2025, Williams announced that he would transfer to Colorado.
