= Scotty Fox Jr. =

American football player

No. 15 – West Virginia Mountaineers
- Position: Quarterback
- Class: Sophomore

Personal information
- Born: March 13, 2007 (age 19)
- Listed height: 6 ft 2 in (1.88 m)
- Listed weight: 213 lb (97 kg)

Career information
- High school: Mentor (Mentor, Ohio)
- College: West Virginia (2025–present)
- Stats at ESPN

Scotty Fox Jr. is an American college football quarterback for the West Virginia Mountaineers.

== Early life ==
Fox attended Mentor High School in Mentor, Ohio. As a junior, he threw for 2,275 yards and 22 touchdowns. In his senior season, Fox threw for 2,759 yards and 34 touchdowns. A four-star recruit, he committed to play college football at West Virginia University.

== College career ==
Fox entered his true freshman season as a backup to Nicco Marchiol, Jaylen Henderson, and Max Brown. In his first career game against Robert Morris, he rushed for his first career touchdown. Following injuries, Fox and Khalil Wilkins competed for the starting role. Prior to the game against UCF, Fox was named the Mountaineers' starting quarterback.

=== Statistics ===
Season	Team	Games			Passing								Rushing			
Season	Team	GP	GS	Record	Comp	Att	Pct	Yards	Avg	TD	Int	Rate	Att	Yards	Avg	TD
2025	West Virginia	10	6	2–4	101	170	59.4	1,276	7.5	7	6	129.0	84	201	2.4	3
Career		10	6	2−4	101	170	59.4	1,276	7.5	7	6	129.0	84	201	2.4	3
