= Joseph Williams (American football) =

American football player (born 2006)

No. 8 – Colorado Buffaloes
- Position: Wide receiver
- Class: Junior

Personal information
- Born: February 27, 2006 (age 20)
- Listed height: 6 ft 2 in (1.88 m)
- Listed weight: 200 lb (91 kg)

Career information
- High school: Mansfield Summit (Arlington, Texas)
- College: Tulsa (2024); Colorado (2025–present)

Awards and highlights
- AAC Rookie of the Year (2024)
- Stats at ESPN

Joseph Williams (born February 27, 2006) is an American college football wide receiver for the Colorado Buffaloes. He previously played for the Tulsa Golden Hurricane.

== Early life ==
Williams attended Mansfield Summit High School in Arlington, Texas, where he played wide receiver and safety. During his career he had 2,054 total yards and 35 touchdowns on offense with 31 tackles and three interceptions on defense. He committed to the University of Tulsa to play college football.

== College career ==
Williams played one year at Tulsa in 2024, starting five of 12 games and recording 30 receptions for 588 yards and five touchdowns. After the season, he entered the transfer portal and committed to the University of Colorado Boulder. In his first season at Colorado in 2025, Williams started six of 10 games and had 37 receptions for 489 yards and four touchdowns. He returned to Colorado his junior year in 2026.
