= Omarion Miller =

American football wide receiver (born 2004)

No. 4 – Arizona State Sun Devils
- Position: Wide receiver
- Class: Senior

Personal information
- Born: December 20, 2004 (age 21)
- Listed height: 6 ft 2 in (1.88 m)
- Listed weight: 210 lb (95 kg)

Career information
- High school: North Caddo (Vivian, Louisiana)
- College: Colorado (2023–2025); Arizona State (2026–present)

Awards and highlights
- Second-team All-Big 12 (2025)
- Stats at ESPN

Omarion Miller (born December 20, 2004) is an American college football wide receiver for the Arizona State Sun Devils. He previously played for the Colorado Buffaloes.

== Early life ==
Miller attended North Caddo High School in Vivian, Louisiana. He was a wide receiver for the football team, averaging 116.4 receiving yards per game and tallying a total of 3,492 receiving yards and 43 touchdowns in 30 games. He was also a star in basketball and was named 2022 Male Athlete of the Year by the Shreveport Times. He initially committed to LSU, but flipped to Nebraska in July 2022, and finally signed with Colorado after Deion Sanders was hired as the head coach.

== College career ==
Against USC on September 30, 2023, Miller made his first collegiate reception for a gain of 65 yards. He followed up with his first touchdown reception later in the same game. He tallied a total of seven catches for 196 yards in the game. Miller's 196 receiving yards broke the Colorado single-game record for a freshman. The Denver Gazette wrote that "a star was born in the form of Miller" and described the game as Miller's "coming out party".

On December 17, 2025, Miller entered the transfer portal. On January 5, 2026, he committed to the Arizona State Sun Devils.
