= 2025 TCU Horned Frogs football team =

American college football season

2025 TCU Horned Frogs football

Alamo Bowl champion

Alamo Bowl, W 30–27 ^{OT} vs. USC
- Conference: Big 12 Conference

Ranking
- AP: No. 25
- Record: 9–4 (5–4 Big 12)
- Head coach: Sonny Dykes (4th season)
- Offensive coordinator: Kendal Briles (3rd season)
- Co-offensive coordinator: A. J. Ricker (4th season)
- Offensive scheme: Bear raid
- Defensive coordinator: Andy Avalos (2nd season)
- Base defense: 4–2–5
- Home stadium: Amon G. Carter Stadium

2025 Big 12 Conference football standings
	Conf.			Overall
Team	W		L	W		L
No. 7 Texas Tech y$^	8	–	1	12	–	2
No. 11 BYU y	8	–	1	12	–	2
No. 14 Utah	7	–	2	11	–	2
No. 22 Houston	6	–	3	10	–	3
Arizona	6	–	3	9	–	4
Arizona State	6	–	3	8	–	5
No. 25 TCU	5	–	4	9	–	4
Iowa State	5	–	4	8	–	4
Cincinnati	5	–	4	7	–	6
Kansas State	5	–	4	6	–	6
Baylor	3	–	6	5	–	7
Kansas	3	–	6	5	–	7
UCF	2	–	7	5	–	7
West Virginia	2	–	7	4	–	8
Colorado	1	–	8	3	–	9
Oklahoma State	0	–	9	1	–	11
Championship: Texas Tech 34, BYU 7
^ – College Football Playoff participant; $ – Conference champion; y – Championship game participant; Rankings from AP Poll

The 2025 TCU Horned Frogs football team represented Texas Christian University (TCU) during the 2025 NCAA Division I FBS football season. The Horned Frogs played their home games at Amon G. Carter Stadium located in Fort Worth, Texas, and competed as members of the Big 12 Conference. They were led by fourth-year head coach Sonny Dykes.

The TCU Horned Frogs drew an average home attendance of 43,319.

== Transfers ==
Incoming

Name	Pos.	Height	Weight	Hometown	Prev. school
Dylan Kinney	OL	6'3"	310 lbs	Richmond, TX	Abilene Christian
Ryan Yaites	S	6'1"	195 lbs	Denton, TX	California
Joseph Manjack IV	WR	6'3"	200 lbs	Tomball, TX	Houston
Jordan Dwyer	WR	5'11"	175 lbs	Puyallup, WA	Idaho
Rasheed Jackson	OT	6'7"	350 lbs	Chicago, IL	Incarnate Word
Kylin Jackson	S	6'2"	196 lbs	Jackson, LA	LSU
Ka'Morreun Pimpton	TE	6'6"	230 lbs	Fort Worth, TX	LSU
Michael Teason	LB	6'2"	215 lbs	St. Louis, MO	Missouri State
Will Halkyard	LS	6'3"	215 lbs	Glen Ellyn, IL	Northwestern
Aaron Bowers	LS	6'3"	225 lbs	Hurst, TX	Texas Wesleyan
Kevorian Barnes	RB	5'9"	190 lbs	San Augustine, TX	UTSA
Elijah Jackson	CB	6'1"	193 lbs	Harbor City, CA	Washington
Ansel Din-Mbuh	DL	6'3"	280 lbs	Aledo, TX	Washington State
Caleb Cortez	LB	6'0"	215 lbs	Celina, TX	William Jewell

Outgoing

Name	Pos.	Height	Weight	Hometown	New school
Kylan Salter	LB	6'1"	210 lbs	Cedar Hill, TX	Colorado
Cole Confessore	DB	6'0"	185 lbs	Burleson, TX	East Texas Baptist
Joe Laterza	LS	6'5"	210 lbs	Arlington Heights, IL	Georgia State
Caleb Sempebwa	PK	6'1"	180 lbs	McKinney, TX	Hawaii
Jax Thompson	LS	6'1"	180 lbs	Flower Mound, TX	Hawaii
Narado Stoker	IOL	6'4"	290 lbs	Dallas, TX	Incarnate Word
Cameron Cook	RB	5'9"	181 lbs	Round Rock, TX	Jacksonville State
James Brockermeyer	IOL	6'3"	270 lbs	Fort Worth, TX	Miami (FL)
Cade Keith	TE	6'4"	227 lbs	Las Vegas, NV	New Mexico
Avion Carter	DL	6'4"	280 lbs	Amarillo, TX	North Texas
Keviyan Huddleston	DL	6'4"	235 lbs	Tyler, TX	North Texas
Julian Knox	CB	6'3"	180 lbs	Fort Worth, TX	North Texas
Hauss Hejny	QB	6'0"	190 lbs	Aledo, TX	Oklahoma State
Richard Toney	S	6'0"	170 lbs	Arlington, TX	Purdue
Dominique Johnson	RB	6'1"	240 lbs	Crowley, TX	Stephen F. Austin
Terrence Cooks	LB	6'2"	210 lbs	Pearland, TX	Texas State
Cole Snodgrass	TE	6'5"	230 lbs	The Woodlands, TX	Texas State
Judson Crockett	S	6'0"	180 lbs	Austin, TX	Trinity (TX)
Mitch Hodnett	OL	6'5"	295 lbs	Monroe, LA	Tulane
JoJo Earle	WR	5'10"	170 lbs	Aledo, TX	UNLV
Shadrach Banks	LB	6'0"	225 lbs	Houston, TX	UTSA
Marcus Williams	OT	6'6"	285 lbs	Longview, TX	TBA

== Roster ==
2025 TCU Horned Frogs football team roster
Players
Coaches
Offense

Pos.	#	Name	Class
TE	0	D'Andre Rogers	Sr
WR	1	Eric McAlister	Sr
RB	2	Kevorian Barnes	Sr
WR	3	Major Everhart	Jr
WR	4	Jordyn Bailey	So
RB	6	Trent Battle	Sr
WR	7	Jordan Dwyer	Jr
QB	9	Ken Seals	Sr
QB	10	Josh Hoover	Jr
QB	11	Adam Schobel	Fr
TE	12	Lafayette Kaiuway	So
QB	12	David Potter	Fr
RB	13	Jon Denman	Fr
WR	14	Joseph Manjack IV	Sr
WR	15	Terry Shelton	Fr
WR	16	Braylon James	So
WR	17	Dane Jones	Fr
WR	18	Ed Small	Fr
QB	19	Jacob Porter	Jr
RB	21	Nate Palmer	Fr
WR	22	Fletcher Fierro	So
RB	23	Derrick Carroll	So
RB	24	Joe Pitchford	Fr
RB	26	Jeremy Payne	So
RB	40	Franklin Estrada II	Sr
OL	50	Witten Van Hoy	Fr
OL	51	Coltin Deery	Sr
OL	53	Tobias Steppes	Fr
OL	54	Quinton Harris	Jr
OL	55	Remington Strickland	Sr
OL	56	Ben Taylor-Whitfield	Jr
OL	57	Samir Camacho	Fr
OL	60	Cade Bennett	Sr
OL	61	Dylan Kinney	Jr
OL	62	Carson Bruno	Sr
OL	65	Logan Schram	Fr
OL	66	Wesley Harvey	Fr
OL	69	Gannon Gaubert	Jr
OL	70	Ryan Hughes	Fr
OL	71	Creece Brister	Fr
OL	72	Jackson Jones	Fr
OL	73	Kilian Registe	Fr
OL	75	Rasheed Jackson	Jr
OL	77	Cooper Powers	So
WR	80	Jacobe Hayes	Fr
TE	81	Chase Curtis	Sr
WR	82	Dozie Ezukanma	Fr
WR	83	Keagan Cunningham	Sr
WR	84	Gekyle Baker	Fr
WR	85	Parker Clark	Jr
WR	86	Sutton Lee	Jr
TE	87	Mason Peterson	Fr
TE	88	Ka'Morreun Pimpton	Jr

Defense

Pos.	#	Name	Class
E	0	Zachary Chapman	So
S	1	Austin Jordan	Sr
S	2	Jamel Johnson	Jr
LB	3	Kaleb Elarms-Orr	Sr
LB	4	Namdi Obiazor	Sr
E	6	Micheal Ibukun-Okeyode	Jr
CB	7	Channing Canada	Sr
E	9	Chad Woodfork	Fr
E	10	Jonathan Bax	Jr
E	11	Devean Deal	Sr
E	12	Travis Jackson	So
S	13	Ryan Yaites	Jr
E	14	John Schobel	Fr
S	15	Devyn Hidrogo	So
CB	16	Jonah Martinez	Jr
CB	17	Devondre McGee	So
S	18	Kaden McFadden	So
S	19	Kylin Jackson	So
CB	20	Jevon McIver Jr.	Sr
S	21	Bud Clark	Sr
S	22	Jordan Lester	So
LB	23	Keylan Abrams	Fr
CB	24	Avery Helm	Sr
CB	25	Elijah Jackson	Sr
CB	26	Vernon Glover	So
LB	27	Michael Teason	So
CB	28	Micah Strickland	Fr
S	29	Rohon Kazadi	Fr
LB	30	Anthony Williams	Fr
S	31	Julius Simms	Fr
LB	32	Dillon Arkansas	Fr
LB	33	Max Carroll	So
DT	34	Perry Cole Jr.	So
DT	35	Tristan Johnson	Fr
S	36	Joseph Albright	Fr
LB	37	Hudson Hooper	So
CB	38	Gil Jackson	Fr
CB	39	Cam Jamerson	Fr
CB	40	Deon Mays	Fr
LB	41	Caleb Cortez	Jr
S	42	Sebastian Peterson	Fr
LB	43	Blake Baldwin	Sr
LB	44	Sam Haley	Fr
LB	46	Rhett Steppe	So
E	47	Thomas Coppinger	Fr
LB	51	Luke Lingard	Sr
DT	52	Blake Robinett	Fr
DT	90	Kelten Mickell	Jr
DT	91	Floyd Guidry	Fr
DT	92	Ansel Din-Mbuh	Jr
DT	93	Brody Whatley	Fr
E	94	Jared Martin	Fr
DT	95	Markis Deal	So
E	97	Paul Oyewale	Jr
DT	98	Sterlin Brooks	Fr
DT	99	Connor Lingren	Jr

Special teams

Pos.	#	Name	Class
P	31	Ethan Craw	Sr
K	34	Kyle Lemmermann	So
K	41	Sam Bisesi	Fr
LS	47	Aaron Bowers	Jr
LS	96	Cal Keeler	Fr
P	97	Easton Black	Jr
K	99	Nate McCashland	So

Head coach

- Sonny Dykes

Coordinators/assistant coaches

- Kendal Briles (offensive coordinator/quarterbacks)
- Andy Avalos (defensive coordinator)
- A. J. Ricker (co-offensive coordinator/offensive line)
- Julius Brown (cornerbacks)
- Malcolm Kelly (assistant head coach/wide receivers)
- Mitch Kirsch (tight ends)
- Jamarkus McFarland (defensive line)
- Jimmy Smith (running backs)
- Tre Watson (safeties)
- Ken Wilson (linebackers)
- Mark Tommerdahl (special assistant to the head coach)

Legend

- (C) Team captain
- (S) Suspended
- (I) Ineligible
- Injured
- Redshirt

Roster
Last update: July 31, 2025

== Schedule ==
Date	Time	Opponent	Rank	Site	TV	Result	Attendance
September 1	7:00 p.m.	at North Carolina*		Kenan Stadium; Chapel Hill, NC	ESPN	W 48–14	50,500
September 13	7:00 p.m.	No. 13 (FCS) Abilene Christian*		Amon G. Carter Stadium; Fort Worth, TX	ESPN+	W 42–21	48,094
September 20	11:00 a.m.	SMU*		Amon G. Carter Stadium; Fort Worth, TX (Iron Skillet Battle)	ESPN2	W 35–24	43,333
September 26	8:00 p.m.	at Arizona State	No. 24	Mountain America Stadium; Tempe, AZ	FOX	L 24–27	53,774
October 4	6:30 p.m.	Colorado		Amon G. Carter Stadium; Fort Worth, TX	FOX	W 35–21	43,160
October 11	2:30 p.m.	at Kansas State		Bill Snyder Family Football Stadium; Manhattan, KS	FOX	L 28–41	51,316
October 18	11:00 a.m.	Baylor		Amon G. Carter Stadium; Fort Worth, TX (The Revivalry)	ESPN2	W 42–36	43,868
October 25	5:00 p.m.	at West Virginia		Milan Puskar Stadium; Morgantown, WV	ESPN+	W 23–17	54,110
November 8	2:30 p.m.	Iowa State		Amon G. Carter Stadium; Fort Worth, TX	FOX	L 17–20	44,197
November 15	9:15 p.m.	at No. 12 BYU		LaVell Edwards Stadium; Provo, UT	ESPN	L 13–44	64,447
November 22	3:00 p.m.	at No. 23 Houston		TDECU Stadium; Houston, TX	FOX	W 17–14	30,852
November 29	2:30 p.m.	Cincinnati		Amon G. Carter Stadium; Fort Worth, TX	FOX	W 45–23	37,259
December 30	8:00 p.m.	vs. No. 16 USC*		Alamodome; San Antonio, TX (Alamo Bowl)	ESPN	W 30–27 ^{OT}	54,751
*Non-conference game; Rankings from AP Poll (and CFP Rankings, after November 4) - Released prior to game; All times are in Central time

== Rankings ==
Ranking movements Legend: ██ Increase in ranking ██ Decrease in ranking — = Not ranked RV = Received votes
	Week																
Poll	Pre	1	2	3	4	5	6	7	8	9	10	11	12	13	14	15	Final
AP	RV	RV	RV	RV	24	RV	RV	—	RV	—	—	—	—	—	—	RV	25
Coaches	RV	RV	RV	RV	25	RV	RV	RV	RV	RV	RV	—	—	—	RV	RV	RV
CFP	Not released										—	—	—	—	—	—	Not released

== Game summaries ==
=== at North Carolina ===
TCU Horned Frogs (0–0) at North Carolina Tar Heels (0–0) – Game summary

Quarter	1	2	3	4	Total
Horned Frogs	7	13	21	7	48
Tar Heels	7	0	7	0	14

at Kenan Stadium • Chapel Hill, North Carolina

- Date: September 1
- Game time: 8:00 p.m.
- Game weather: Clear • Temperature: 70 °F (21 °C) • Wind: NE at 6 miles per hour (9.7 km/h)
- Game attendance: 50,500
- Referee: Kevin Mar
- TV announcers (ESPN): Rece Davis (play-by-play), Kirk Herbstreit (analyst), and Holly Rowe (sideline reporter)

Game information

First quarter

- (10:55) UNC - Caleb Hood 8-yard run (Rece Verhoff kick), ( Drive: 7 plays, 83 yards, 3:59; North Carolina 7-0)
- (4:08) TCU - Jordan Dwyer 27-yard pass from Josh Hoover (Kyle Lemmermann kick), (Drive: 6 plays, 58 yards, 2:31; Tied 7-7)

Second quarter

- (11:13) TCU - Kyle Lemmermann 32-yard field goal (Drive: 14 plays, 55 yards, 6:24; TCU 10-7)
- (3:57) TCU - Bud Clark 25-yard interception return (Kyle Lemmermann kick), (TCU 17-7)
- (0:00) TCU - Kyle Lemmermann 33-yard field goal (Drive: 9 plays, 63 yards, 0:53; TCU 20-7)

Third quarter

- (14:48) TCU - Kevorian Barnes 75-yard run (Kyle Lemmermann kick), (Drive: 1 play, 75 yards, 0:12; TCU 27-7)
- (8:30) TCU - Trent Battle 28-yard run (Kyle Lemmermann kick), (Drive: 9 plays, 85 yards, 3:59; TCU 34-7)
- (6:56) TCU - Devean Deal 37-yard fumble return (Kyle Lemmermann kick) (TCU 41-7)
- (0:29) UNC - Jake Johnson 2-yard pass from Max Johnson (Rece Verhoff kick), (Drive: 10 plays, 80 yards, 6:22; TCU 41-14)

Fourth quarter

- (9:21) TCU - DJ Rogers 4-yard pass from Josh Hoover (Kyle Lemmermann kick), (Drive: 5 plays, 76 yards, 2:26; TCU 48-14)

Statistics	TCU	UNC
First downs	29	10
Plays–yards	72–542	49–222
Rushes–yards	35–258	28–50
Passing yards	284	172
Passing: comp–att–int	27-37-1	13–21–1
Turnovers	1	3
Time of possession	32:09	27:51

Team	Category	Player	Statistics
TCU	Passing	Josh Hoover	27/36, 284 yards, 2 TD, INT
TCU	Rushing	Kevorian Barnes	11 carries, 113 yards, TD
TCU	Receiving	Jordan Dwyer	9 receptions, 136 yards, TD
North Carolina	Passing	Max Johnson	9/11, 103 yards, TD
North Carolina	Rushing	Caleb Hood	10 carries, 31 yards, TD
North Carolina	Receiving	Jordan Shipp	4 receptions, 84 yards

=== vs No. 13 (FCS) Abilene Christian ===
No. 13 (FCS) Abilene Christian Wildcats (1–1) at TCU Horned Frogs (1–0) – Game summary

Quarter	1	2	3	4	Total
No. 13 (FCS) Wildcats	0	0	9	12	21
Horned Frogs	14	14	7	7	42

at Amon G. Carter Stadium • Fort Worth, Texas

- Date: September 13
- Game time: 7:00 p.m.
- Game weather: Clear • Temperature: 87 °F (31 °C) • Wind: SE at 10 miles per hour (16 km/h)
- Game attendance: 48,094
- Referee: Stephen Baron
- TV announcers (ESPN+): Roxy Bernstein (play-by-play) and Todd Doxzon (analyst)

Game information

First quarter

- TCU – Chase Curtis 11-yard pass from Josh Hoover (Nate McCashland kick), 11:43. Horned Frogs 7–0. Drive: 7 plays, 88 yards, 3:09.
- TCU – Ed Small 8-yard pass from Josh Hoover (Nate McCashland kick), 4:33. Horned Frogs 14–0. Drive: 10 plays, 77 yards, 3:13.

Second quarter

- TCU – Trent Battle 1-yard run (Nate McCashland kick), 13:10. Horned Frogs 21–0. Drive: 7 plays, 93 yards, 2:37.
- TCU – Ed Small 15-yard pass from Josh Hoover (Nate McCashland kick), 1:24. Horned Frogs 28–0. Drive: 11 plays, 69 yards, 4:20.

Third quarter

- ACU – Rovaughn Banks Jr. 1-yard run (kick failed), 10:23. Horned Frogs 28–6. Drive: 9 plays, 75 yards, 4:37.
- TCU – Jordan Dwyer 21-yard pass from Josh Hoover (Nate McCashland kick), 8:59. Horned Frogs 35–6. Drive: 5 plays, 75 yards, 1:19.
- ACU – Brandon Perez 33-yard field goal, 3:45. Horned Frogs 35–9. Drive: 11 plays, 58 yards, 5:14.

Fourth quarter

- TCU – Jon Denman 2-yard run (Nate McCashland kick), 14:56. Horned Frogs 42–9. Drive: 10 plays, 60 yards, 3:42.
- ACU – Bryan Henry 7-yard pass from Stone Earle (pass failed), 11:08. Horned Frogs 42–15. Drive: 9 plays, 75 yards, 3:48.
- ACU – J. B. Mitchell III 9-yard pass from Stone Earle (pass failed), 6:40. Horned Frogs 42–21. Drive: 8 plays, 78 yards, 3:16.

Statistics	ACU	TCU
First downs	27	24
Plays–yards	75–453	60–489
Rushes–yards	46–177	28–128
Passing yards	276	361
Passing: comp–att–int	22–29–0	25–32–1
Turnovers	0	1
Time of possession	36:43	23:17

Team	Category	Player	Statistics
Abilene Christian	Passing	Stone Earle	22/29, 276 yards, 2 TD
Abilene Christian	Rushing	Rovaughn Banks Jr.	19 carries, 105 yards, TD
Abilene Christian	Receiving	J. B. Mitchell III	5 receptions, 88 yards, TD
TCU	Passing	Josh Hoover	21/27, 337 yards, 4 TD
TCU	Rushing	Kevorian Barnes	10 carries, 43 yards
TCU	Receiving	Joseph Manjack IV	4 receptions, 114 yards

=== vs SMU (rivalry) ===
SMU Mustangs (2–1) at TCU Horned Frogs (2–0) – Game summary

Quarter	1	2	3	4	Total
Mustangs	3	7	7	7	24
Horned Frogs	7	7	7	14	35

at Amon G. Carter Stadium • Fort Worth, Texas

- Date: September 20
- Game time: 11:00 a.m. CDT
- Game weather: Sunny, 86 degrees
- Game attendance: 43,333
- Referee: Jerry Magallanes
- TV announcers (ESPN2): Roy Philpott (play-by-play), Sam Acho (analyst) and Taylor Davis (sideline)

Game information

First quarter

- TCU – Eric McAlister 27-yard pass from Josh Hoover (Nate McCashland kick), 8:56. Horned Frogs 7–0. Drive: 9 plays, 67 yards, 4:23.
- SMU – Sam Keltner 28-yard field goal, 3:32. Horned Frogs 7–3. Drive: 12 plays, 68 yards, 5:18.

Second quarter

- TCU – Jeremy Payne 10-yard pass from Josh Hoover (Nate McCashland kick), 14:26. Horned Frogs 14–3. Drive: 13 plays, 75 yards, 4:06.
- SMU – Matthew Hibner 9-yard pass from Kevin Jennings (Sam Keltner kick), 7:21. Horned Frogs 14–10. Drive: 12 plays, 75 yards, 6:59.

Third quarter

- TCU – Joseph Manjack IV 4-yard pass from Josh Hoover (Nate McCashland kick), 10:50. Horned Frogs 21–10. Drive: 4 plays, 53 yards, 1:31.
- SMU – Yamir Knight 7-yard pass from Kevin Jennings (Sam Keltner kick), 5:54. Horned Frogs 21–17. Drive: 10 plays, 75 yards, 4:56.

Fourth quarter

- SMU – Jordan Hudson 34-yard pass from Kevin Jennings (Sam Keltner kick), 10:30. Mustangs 24–21. Drive: 4 plays, 65 yards, 1:49.
- TCU – Eric McAlister 70-yard pass from Josh Hoover (Nate McCashland kick), 9:18. Horned Frogs 28–24. Drive: 3 plays, 75 yards, 1:12.
- TCU – Eric McAlister 44-yard pass from Josh Hoover (Nate McCashland kick), 6:03. Horned Frogs 35–24. Drive: 6 plays, 75 yards, 2:45.

Statistics	SMU	TCU
First downs	19	24
Plays–yards	65–384	77–517
Rushes–yards	27–94	37–138
Passing yards	290	379
Passing: comp–att–int	24–38–2	22–40–1
Turnovers	2	1
Time of possession	28:54	31:06

Team	Category	Player	Statistics
SMU	Passing	Kevin Jennings	24/38, 290 yards, 3 TD, 2 INT
SMU	Rushing	T. J. Harden	15 carries, 56 yards
SMU	Receiving	Yamir Knight	5 receptions, 69 yards, TD
TCU	Passing	Josh Hoover	22/40, 379 yards, 5 TD, INT
TCU	Rushing	Trent Battle	7 carries, 60 yards
TCU	Receiving	Eric McAlister	8 receptions, 254 yards, 3 TD

=== at Arizona State ===
No. 24 TCU Horned Frogs (3–0) at Arizona State Sun Devils (3–1) – Game summary

Quarter	1	2	3	4	Total
No. 24 Horned Frogs	7	10	7	0	24
Sun Devils	0	14	3	10	27

at Mountain America Stadium • Tempe, Arizona

- Date: September 26
- Game time: 8:00 p.m.
- Game weather: Sunny • Temperature: 72 °F (22 °C) • Wind: NE 15 mph
- Game attendance: 53,774
- Referee: Michael Vandervelde
- TV announcers (FOX): Tim Brando (play-by-play), Devin Gardner (analyst), and Josh Sims (sideline reporter)

Game information

First quarter

- TCU – Trent Battle 13-yard run (Nate McCashland kick), 3:11. Horned Frogs 7–0. Drive: 7 plays, 51 yards, 3:08.

Second quarter

- TCU – Jeremy Payne 7-yard run (Nate McCashland kick), 10:22. Horned Frogs 14–0. Drive: 8 plays, 71 yards, 3:51.
- TCU – Nate McCashland 27-yard field goal, 6:24. Horned Frogs 17–0. Drive: 6 plays, 29 yards, 2:00.
- ASU – Jordyn Tyson 57-yard pass from Sam Leavitt (Jesus Gomez kick), 4:51. Horned Frogs 17–7. Drive: 3 plays, 65 yards, 1:23.
- ASU – Sam Leavitt 8-yard run (Jesus Gomez kick), 1:56. Horned Frogs 17–14. Drive: 5 plays, 47 yards, 1:37.

Third quarter

- ASU – Jesus Gomez 26-yard field goal, 7:00. Tied 17–17. Drive: 12 plays, 83 yards, 5:40.
- TCU – Josh Hoover 1-yard run (Nate McCashland kick), 4:02. Horned Frogs 24–17. Drive: 8 plays, 65 yards, 2:58.

Fourth quarter

- ASU – Jordyn Tyson 4-yard pass from Sam Leavitt (Jesus Gomez kick), 1:50. Tied 24–24. Drive: 11 plays, 73 yards, 3:52.
- ASU – Jesus Gomez 23-yard field goal, 1:14. Sun Devils 27–24. Drive: 5 plays, 9 yards, 0:28.

Statistics	TCU	ASU
First downs	15	25
Plays–yards	57–271	81–500
Rushes–yards	24–12	42–209
Passing yards	259	291
Passing: comp–att–int	21–33–2	27–39–0
Turnovers	3	1
Time of possession	24:13	35:47

Team	Category	Player	Statistics
TCU	Passing	Josh Hoover	20/32, 242 yards, 2 INT
TCU	Rushing	Trent Battle	9 carries, 30 yards, TD
TCU	Receiving	Joseph Manjack IV	6 receptions, 83 yards
Arizona State	Passing	Sam Leavitt	27/39, 291 yards, 2 TD
Arizona State	Rushing	Raleek Brown	21 carries, 134 yards
Arizona State	Receiving	Jordyn Tyson	8 receptions, 126 yards, 2 TD

=== vs Colorado ===
Colorado Buffaloes (2–3) at TCU Horned Frogs (3–1) – Game summary

Quarter	1	2	3	4	Total
Buffaloes	0	14	0	7	21
Horned Frogs	0	14	0	21	35

at Amon G. Carter Stadium • Fort Worth, Texas

- Date: October 4
- Game time: 6:30 p.m. CDT
- Game weather: Clear, 86 °F (30 °C)
- Game attendance: 43,160
- Referee: Henry Jones
- TV announcers (FOX): Connor Onion (play-by-play), Robert Griffin III (analyst), and Alexa Landestoy (sideline)

Game information

First quarter

- No scoring plays.

Second quarter

- (13:33) COL – Omarion Miller 6-yard pass from Kaidon Salter, Alejandro Mata kick (Drive: 13 plays, 80 yards, 6:54; Colorado 7–0)
- (6:32) COL – Kaidon Salter 10-yard run, Alejandro Mata kick (Drive: 12 plays, 45 yards, 5:19; Colorado 14–0)
- (2:38) TCU – Josh Hoover 1-yard run, Nate McCashland kick (Drive: 10 plays, 76 yards, 3:49; Colorado 14–7)
- (1:32) TCU – Eric McAlister 23-yard pass from Josh Hoover, Nate McCashland kick (Drive: 2 plays, 33 yards, 0:21; Tied 14–14)

Third quarter

- No scoring plays.

Fourth quarter

- (14:04) TCU – Lafayette Kaiuway 10-yard pass from Josh Hoover, Nate McCashland kick (Drive: 12 plays, 67 yards, 5:25; TCU 21–14)
- (11:42) COL – Omarion Miller 31-yard pass from Kaidon Salter, Alejandro Mata kick (Drive: 5 plays, 50 yards, 2:22; Tied 21–21)
- (5:44) TCU – Joseph Manjack IV 18-yard pass from Josh Hoover, Nate McCashland kick (Drive: 3 plays, 27 yards, 1:12; TCU 28–21)
- (0:19) TCU – Eric McAlister 21-yard pass from Josh Hoover, Nate McCashland kick (Drive: 7 plays, 59 yards, 2:14; TCU 35–21)

Statistics	COLO	TCU
First downs	20	23
Plays–yards	65–343	68–369
Rushes–yards	35–126	35–94
Passing yards	217	275
Passing: Comp–Att–Int	18–30–3	23–33–0
Turnovers	4	0
Time of possession	31:32	28:28

Team	Category	Player	Statistics
Colorado	Passing	Kaidon Salter	18/29, 217 yards, 2 TD, 3 INT
Colorado	Rushing	Dallan Hayden	9 carries, 61 yards
Colorado	Receiving	Omarion Miller	6 receptions, 89 yards, 2 TD
TCU	Passing	Josh Hoover	23/33, 275 yards, 4 TD
TCU	Rushing	Kevorian Barnes	16 carries, 48 yards
TCU	Receiving	Eric McAlister	4 receptions, 65 yards, 2 TD

=== at Kansas State ===
TCU Horned Frogs (4–1) at Kansas State Wildcats (2–4) – Game summary

Quarter	1	2	3	4	Total
Horned Frogs	0	7	7	14	28
Wildcats	0	14	14	13	41

at Bill Snyder Family Football Stadium • Manhattan, Kansas

- Date: October 11
- Game time: 2:30 p.m. CDT
- Game weather: Sunny • Temperature: 81 °F (27 °C) • Wind: SE at 9 miles per hour (14 km/h)
- Game attendance: 51,316
- Referee: Cravonne Barrett
- TV announcers (FOX): Tim Brando (play-by-play), Devin Gardner (analyst) and Josh Sims (sideline)

Game information

First quarter

- No scoring plays.

Second quarter

- (5:35) TCU – Jeremy Payne 1-yard run, Nate McCashland kick (Drive: 12 plays, 93 yards, 4:56; TCU 7–0)
- (2:45) KSU – Garrett Oakley 32-yard pass from Avery Johnson, Luis Rodriguez kick (Drive: 6 plays, 75 yards, 2:50; Tied 7–7)
- (2:02) KSU – Wesley Fair 15-yard fumble return, Luis Rodriguez kick (Kansas State 14–7)

Third quarter

- (10:28) KSU – Des Purnell 25-yard interception return, Luis Rodriguez kick (Kansas State 21–7)
- (3:57) KSU – Garrett Oakley 17-yard pass from Avery Johnson, Luis Rodriguez kick (Drive: 10 plays, 74 yards, 5:00; Kansas State 28–7)
- (2:06) TCU – Chase Curtis 2-yard pass from Josh Hoover, Nate McCashland kick (Drive: 7 plays, 75 yards, 1:51; Kansas State 28–14)

Fourth quarter

- (10:22) KSU – Jerand Bradley 12-yard pass from Avery Johnson, Luis Rodriguez kick (Drive: 12 plays, 75 yards, 6:44; Kansas State 35–14)
- (10:05) TCU – Eric McAlister 85-yard pass from Josh Hoover, Nate McCashland kick (Drive: 1 play, 75 yards, 0:17; Kansas State 35–21)
- (4:34) KSU – Luis Rodriguez 19-yard field goal (Drive: 6 plays, 20 yards, 2:49; Kansas State 38–21)
- (2:06) KSU – Luis Rodriguez 36-yard field goal (Drive: 4 plays, 7 yards, 2:09; Kansas State 41–21)
- (0:26) TCU – Eric McAlister 37-yard pass from Josh Hoover, Nate McCashland kick (Drive: 5 plays, 73 yards, 1:33; Kansas State 41–28)

Statistics	TCU	KSU
First downs	19	20
Plays–yards	69–448	71–343
Rushes–yards	22–72	45–145
Passing yards	376	198
Passing: comp–att–int	26–47–2	16–26–0
Turnovers	3	0
Time of possession	23:41	36:19

Team	Category	Player	Statistics
TCU	Passing	Josh Hoover	26/47, 376 yards, 3 TD, 2 INT
TCU	Rushing	Kevorian Barnes	12 carries, 81 yards
TCU	Receiving	Eric McAlister	4 receptions, 156 yards, 2 TD
Kansas State	Passing	Avery Johnson	16/26, 198 yards, 3 TD
Kansas State	Rushing	Joe Jackson	27 carries, 110 yards
Kansas State	Receiving	Garrett Oakley	4 receptions, 71 yards, 2 TD

=== vs Baylor (rivalry) ===
Baylor Bears (4–2) at TCU Horned Frogs (4–2) – Game summary

Quarter	1	2	3	4	Total
Bears	7	3	8	18	36
Horned Frogs	0	21	7	14	42

at Amon G. Carter Stadium • Fort Worth, Texas

- Date: October 18
- Game time: 11:00 a.m.
- Game weather: Cloudy • Temperature: 77 °F (25 °C) • Wind: SW at 12 mph (19 km/h)
- Game attendance: 43,868
- Referee: David Alvarez
- TV announcers (ESPN2): Lowell Galindo (play-by-play), Aaron Murray (analyst) and Lauren Sisler (sideline)

Game information

First quarter

- (0:53) BAY – Bryson Washington 1-yard run, Connor Hawkins kick (Drive: 13 plays, 92 yards, 6:22; Baylor 7–0)

Second quarter

- (10:59) TCU – DJ Rogers 8-yard pass from Josh Hoover, Nate McCashland kick (Drive: 12 plays, 75 yards, 4:54; Tied 7–7)
- (6:10) TCU – Kevorian Barnes 5-yard run, Nate McCashland kick (Drive: 2 plays, 17 yards, 0:29; TCU 14–7)
- (2:04) BAY – Connor Hawkins 42-yard field goal (Drive: 11 plays, 47 yards, 3:58; TCU 14–10)
- (0:11) TCU – Jordan Dwyer 6-yard pass from Josh Hoover, Nate McCashland kick (Drive: 10 plays, 77 yards, 1:47; TCU 21–10)

Third quarter

- (11:39) TCU – Ka'Morreun Pimpton 3-yard pass from Josh Hoover, Nate McCashland kick (Drive: 7 plays, 74 yards, 3:13; TCU 28–10)
- (6:40) BAY – Jadon Porter 18-yard pass from Sawyer Robertson, Sawyer Robertson–Josh Cameron pass (Drive: 13 plays, 75 yards, 4:59; TCU 28–18)

Fourth quarter

- (14:55) BAY – Connor Hawkins 41-yard field goal (Drive: 12 plays, 58 yards, 5:14; TCU 28–21)
- (13:46) TCU – Trent Battle 65-yard run, Nate McCashland kick (Drive: 3 plays, 75 yards, 1:09; TCU 35–21)
- (6:04) TCU – Kevorian Barnes 14-yard run, Nate McCashland kick (Drive: 4 plays, 33 yards, 2:12; TCU 42–21)
- (3:08) BAY – Keaton Thomas 42-yard fumble return, Sawyer Robertson run (TCU 42–29)
- (0:30) BAY – Kole Wilson 35-yard pass from Sawyer Robertson, Connor Hawkins kick (Drive: 10 plays, 95 yards, 1:19; TCU 42–36)

Statistics	BAY	TCU
First downs	27	21
Plays–yards	89–439	69–427
Rushes–yards	37–121	38–196
Passing yards	318	231
Passing: comp–att–int	25–52–3	22–31–0
Turnovers	4	1
Time of possession	31:48	28:12

Team	Category	Player	Statistics
Baylor	Passing	Sawyer Robertson	25/52, 318 yards, 2 TD, 3 INT
Baylor	Rushing	Michael Turner	12 carries, 68 yards
Baylor	Receiving	Ashtyn Hawkins	7 receptions, 95 yards
TCU	Passing	Josh Hoover	22/31, 231 yards, 3 TD
TCU	Rushing	Kevorian Barnes	25 carries, 106 yards, 2 TD
TCU	Receiving	Jordan Dwyer	7 receptions, 111 yards, TD

=== at West Virginia ===
TCU Horned Frogs (5–2) at West Virginia Mountaineers (2–5) – Game summary

Quarter	1	2	3	4	Total
Horned Frogs	10	10	0	3	23
Mountaineers	0	7	3	7	17

at Milan Puskar Stadium • Morgantown, West Virginia

- Date: October 25
- Game time: 5:00 p.m. CDT
- Game weather: Cloudy • Temperature: 53 °F (12 °C) • Wind: NE 1 mph
- Game attendance: 54,110
- Referee: Kevin Mar
- TV announcers (ESPN+): Pete Sousa (play-by-play) and Craig Haubert (sideline)

Game information

First quarter

- (11:35) TCU – Nate McCashland 35-yard field goal (Drive: 5 plays, 31 yards, 2:11; TCU 3–0)
- (4:31) TCU – Trent Battle 1-yard run, Nate McCashland kick (Drive: 7 plays, 48 yards, 3:12; TCU 10–0)

Second quarter

- (11:50) WVU – Grayson Barnes 17-yard pass from Scotty Fox Jr., Kade Hensley kick (Drive: 4 plays, 35 yards, 1:37; TCU 10–7)
- (6:12) TCU – Eric McAlister 4-yard pass from Josh Hoover, Nate McCashland kick (Drive: 11 plays, 70 yards, 5:38; TCU 17–7)
- (0:59) TCU – Nate McCashland 22-yard field goal (Drive: 7 plays, 53 yards, 1:58; TCU 20–7)

Third quarter

- (1:20) WVU – Kade Hensley 28-yard field goal (Drive: 10 plays, 60 yards, 3:45; TCU 20–10)

Fourth quarter

- (4:48) TCU – Nate McCashland 41-yard field goal (Drive: 13 plays, 38 yards, 6:50; TCU 23–10)
- (3:15) WVU – Jeff Weimer 28-yard pass from Scotty Fox Jr., Kade Hensley kick (Drive: 7 plays, 75 yards, 1:33; TCU 23–17)

Statistics	TCU	WVU
First downs	19	19
Plays–yards	72–343	73–342
Rushes–yards	33–96	32–41
Passing yards	247	301
Passing: comp–att–int	24–39–0	28–41–0
Turnovers	0	0
Time of possession	34:03	25:57

Team	Category	Player	Statistics
TCU	Passing	Josh Hoover	24/39, 247 yards, TD
TCU	Rushing	Trent Battle	19 carries, 89 yards, TD
TCU	Receiving	Eric McAlister	9 receptions, 124 yards, TD
West Virginia	Passing	Scotty Fox Jr.	28/41, 301 yards, 2 TD
West Virginia	Rushing	Diore Hubbard	14 carries, 32 yards
West Virginia	Receiving	Cam Vaughn	6 receptions, 85 yards

=== vs Iowa State ===
Iowa State Cyclones (5–4) at TCU Horned Frogs (6–2) – Game summary

Quarter	1	2	3	4	Total
Cyclones	6	0	0	14	20
Horned Frogs	0	3	7	7	17

at Amon G. Carter Stadium • Fort Worth, Texas

- Date: November 8
- Game time: 2:30 p.m.
- Game weather:
- Game attendance: 44,197
- Referee: Stephen Baron
- TV announcers (FOX): Connor Onion (play-by-play) and Mark Helfrich (analyst)

Game information

First quarter

- ISU – Benjamin Brahmer 23-yard pass from Rocco Becht (run failed), 9:18. Cyclones 6–0. Drive: 8 plays, 65 yards, 3:29.

Second quarter

- TCU – Nate McCashland 35-yard field goal, 3:54. Cyclones 6–3. Drive: 13 plays, 73 yards, 5:15.

Third quarter

- TCU – Jordan Dwyer 14-yard pass from Josh Hoover (Nate McCashland kick), 9:07. Horned Frogs 10–6. Drive: 14 plays, 78 yards, 5:52.

Fourth quarter

- TCU – Trent Battle 2-yard run (Nate McCashland kick), 13:30. Horned Frogs 17–6. Drive: 11 plays, 92 yards, 4:29.
- ISU – Carson Hansen 1-yard run (run failed), 8:12. Horned Frogs 17–12. Drive: 11 plays, 75 yards, 5:18.
- ISU – Aiden Flora 79-yard punt return (Carson Hansen run), 6:32. Cyclones 20–17.

Statistics	ISU	TCU
First downs	15	30
Plays–yards	65–272	80–432
Rushes–yards	41–161	30–113
Passing yards	111	319
Passing: comp–att–int	9–24–2	34–50–2
Turnovers	2	3
Time of possession	27:24	32:36

Team	Category	Player	Statistics
Iowa State	Passing	Rocco Becht	9/24, 111 yards, TD, 2 INT
Iowa State	Rushing	Carson Hansen	28 carries, 108 yards, TD
Iowa State	Receiving	Chase Sowell	4 receptions, 31 yards
TCU	Passing	Josh Hoover	34/50, 319 yards, TD, 2 INT
TCU	Rushing	Jeremy Payne	8 carries, 71 yards
TCU	Receiving	Jordan Dwyer	11 receptions, 108 yards, TD

=== at No. 12 BYU ===
TCU Horned Frogs (6–3) at No. 12 BYU Cougars (8–1) – Game summary

Quarter	1	2	3	4	Total
Horned Frogs	0	10	3	0	13
No. 12 Cougars	10	17	3	14	44

at LaVell Edwards Stadium • Provo, Utah

- Date: November 15
- Game time: 9:15 p.m.
- Game weather: Clear, 55 °F (13 °C), Winds 3mph NE
- Game attendance: 64,447
- Referee: Tutashinda Salaam
- TV announcers (ESPN): Dave Flemming (play-by-play), Brock Osweiler (analyst), and Stormy Buonantony (sideline)

Game information

First quarter

- BYU – 10:27 Will Ferrin 52-yard field goal. BYU 3-0. Drive: 10 plays, 45 yards, 3:47.
- BYU – 2:13 Parker Kingston 11-yard run (Will Ferrin kick). BYU 10–0. Drive: 10 plays, 91 yards, 6:02.

Second quarter

- BYU – 10:16 Bear Bachmeier 17-yard run (Will Ferrin kick). BYU 17–0. Drive: 10 plays, 75 yards, 5:44.
- TCU – 7:17 Nate McCashland 22-yard field goal. BYU 17-3. Drive: 8 plays, 70 yards, 2:59.
- BYU – 6:00 Carsen Ryan 43-yard pass from Bear Bachmeier (Will Ferrin kick). BYU 24–3. Drive: 4 plays, 75 yards, 1:03.
- TCU – 1:14 Jon Denman 13-yard run (Nate McCashland kick). BYU 24–10. Drive: 10 plays, 75 yards, 4:46.
- BYU – 0:00 Will Ferrin 35-yard field goal. BYU 27-10. Drive: 10 plays, 58 yards, 1:14.

Third quarter

- TCU – 10:13 Nate McCashland 33-yard field goal. BYU 27-13. Drive: 11 plays, 59 yards, 4:47.
- BYU – 4:08 Will Ferrin 29-yard field goal. BYU 30-13. Drive: 12 plays, 64 yards, 6:05.

Fourth quarter

- BYU – 13:36 LJ Martin 1-yard run (Will Ferrin kick). BYU 37–13. Drive: 8 plays, 43 yards, 4:33.
- BYU – 4:09 Tanner Wall 68-yard interception return (Will Ferrin kick). BYU 44–13.

Statistics	TCU	BYU
First downs	15	28
Plays–yards	57–298	72–447
Rushes–yards	34–115	39–151
Passing yards	183	296
Passing: comp–att–int	10–23–2	23–33–0
Turnovers	2	1
Time of possession	23:55	36:05

Team	Category	Player	Statistics
TCU	Passing	Josh Hoover	10/23, 183 yards, 2 INT
TCU	Rushing	Jeremy Payne	9 carries, 55 yards
TCU	Receiving	Eric McAlister	4 receptions, 107 yards
BYU	Passing	Bear Bachmeier	23/33, 296 yards, TD
BYU	Rushing	LJ Martin	21 carries, 88 yards, TD
BYU	Receiving	Parker Kingston	5 receptions, 80 yards

=== at No. 23 Houston ===
TCU Horned Frogs (6–4) at No. 23 Houston Cougars (8–2) – Game summary

Quarter	1	2	3	4	Total
Horned Frogs	14	0	0	3	17
No. 23 Cougars	0	7	7	0	14

at TDECU Stadium • Houston, Texas

- Date: November 22
- Game time: 3:00 p.m.
- Game weather: Clear, 78 °F (26 °C)
- Game attendance: 30,852
- Referee: Michael Vandervelde
- TV announcers (FOX): Tim Brando (play-by-play), Devin Gardner (analyst) and Josh Sims (sideline)

Game information

First quarter

- (11:20) TCU - Eric McAlister 33-yard pass from Josh Hoover, Nate McCashland kick (Drive: 8 plays, 75 yards, 3:40; Horned Frogs 7-0)
- (1:45) TCU - Jordan Dwyer 17-yard pass from Josh Hoover, Nate McCashland kick (Drive: 10 plays, 83 yards, 3:46; Horned Frogs 14-0)

Second quarter

- (8:21) HOU - Amare Thomas 15-yard pass from Conner Weigman, Ethan Sanchez kick (Drive: 11 plays, 62 yards, 5:36; Horned Frogs 14-7)

Third quarter

- (5:34) HOU - Dean Connors 8-yard pass from Conner Weigman, Ethan Sanchez kick (Drive: 6 plays, 71 yards, 3:09; Tied 14-14)

Fourth quarter

- (11:21) TCU - Nate McCashland 29-yard field goal (Drive: 7 plays, 17 yards, 3:12; Horned Frogs 17-14)

Statistics	TCU	HOU
First downs	22	17
Plays–yards	69–426	69–391
Rushes–yards	36–133	40–230
Passing yards	293	161
Passing: comp–att–int	24–33–3	15–29–1
Turnovers	4	1
Time of possession	27:32	32:28

Team	Category	Player	Statistics
TCU	Passing	Josh Hoover	24/33, 293 yards, 2 TD, 3 INT
TCU	Rushing	Jeremy Payne	18 carries, 103 yards
TCU	Receiving	Joseph Manjack IV	9 receptions, 95 yards
Houston	Passing	Conner Weigman	15/29, 161 yards, 2 TD, INT
Houston	Rushing	Conner Weigman	15 carries, 114 yards
Houston	Receiving	Amare Thomas	5 receptions, 72 yards, TD

=== vs Cincinnati ===
Cincinnati Bearcats (7-4) at TCU Horned Frogs (7-4) – Game summary

Quarter	1	2	3	4	Total
Bearcats	7	10	0	6	23
Horned Frogs	21	10	7	7	45

at Amon G. Carter Stadium • Fort Worth, Texas

- Date: November 29
- Game time: 2:30 p.m.
- Game weather:
- Game attendance: 37,259
- Referee: Michael VanderVelde
- TV announcers (FOX): Jason Benetti (play-by-play), Robert Griffin III (analyst) and Alexa Landestoy (sideline)

Game information

First quarter

- TCU – Joseph Manjack IV 3-yard pass from Josh Hoover (Nate McCashland kick), 9:51. Horned Frogs 7–0. Drive: 8 plays, 34 yards, 3:23.
- TCU – Eric McAlister 17-yard pass from Josh Hoover (Nate McCashland kick), 5:44. Horned Frogs 14–0. Drive: 5 plays, 81 yards, 2:15.
- CIN – Evan Pryor 26-yard pass from Brendan Sorsby (Stephen Rusnak kick), 1:53. Horned Frogs 14–7. Drive: 7 plays, 75 yards, 3:51.
- TCU – Jordan Dwyer 69-yard pass from Josh Hoover (Nate McCashland kick), 0:45. Horned Frogs 21–7. Drive: 3 plays, 75 yards, 1:08.

Second quarter

- CIN – Jeff Caldwell 14-yard pass from Brendan Sorsby (Stephen Rusnak kick), 11:27. Horned Frogs 21–14. Drive: 8 plays, 75 yards, 4:18.
- TCU – Nate McCashland 32-yard field goal, 5:21. Horned Frogs 24–14. Drive: 10 plays, 17 yards, 4:51.
- CIN – Stephen Rusnak 26-yard field goal, 3:13. Horned Frogs 24–17. Drive: 6 plays, 67 yards, 2:08.
- TCU – Jeremy Payne 9-yard run (Nate McCashland kick), 0:23. Horned Frogs 31–17. Drive: 9 plays, 75 yards, 2:50.

Third quarter

- TCU – Joseph Manjack IV 44-yard pass from Josh Hoover, fumbled, Jordan Dwyer fumble recovery in the end zone (Nate McCashland kick), 11:08. Horned Frogs 38–17. Drive: 8 plays, 75 yards, 4:10.

Fourth quarter

- CIN – Cyrus Allen 35-yard pass from Brendan Sorsby (pass failed), 12:47. Horned Frogs 38–23. Drive: 6 plays, 94 yards, 2:05.
- TCU – Jeremy Payne 51-yard run (Nate McCashland kick), 10:28. Horned Frogs 45–23. Drive: 5 plays, 75 yards, 2:19.

Statistics	CIN	TCU
First downs	17	27
Plays–yards	52–397	74–544
Rushes–yards	19–115	52–238
Passing yards	282	306
Passing: comp–att–int	23–33–0	19–22–0
Turnovers	1	0
Time of possession	22:05	37:55

Team	Category	Player	Statistics
Cincinnati	Passing	Brendan Sorsby	23/33, 282 yards, 3 TD
Cincinnati	Rushing	Brendan Sorsby	10 carries, 59 yards
Cincinnati	Receiving	Caleb Goodie	5 receptions, 67 yards
TCU	Passing	Josh Hoover	19/22, 306 yards, 4 TD
TCU	Rushing	Jeremy Payne	26 carries, 174 yards, 2 TD
TCU	Receiving	Eric McAlister	8 receptions, 101 yards, TD

=== vs. No. 16 USC (Alamo Bowl) ===
2025 Valero Alamo Bowl
No. 16 USC Trojans (9–3) vs. TCU Horned Frogs (8–4) – Game summary

Quarter	1	2	3	4	OT	Total
No. 16 Trojans	3	10	8	3	3	27
Horned Frogs	0	14	0	10	6	30

at Alamodome • San Antonio, TX

- Date: December 30
- Game time: 8:00 p.m. CST
- Game weather: None (roof closed)
- Game attendance: 54,751
- Referee: Justin Eillot
- TV announcers (ESPN): Bob Wischusen (play-by-play), Louis Riddick (analyst) and Dana Boyle (sideline)

Game information

First quarter

- (7:06) USC – Ryon Sayeri 40-yard field goal (7 plays, 50 yards, 3:46; USC 3–0)

Second quarter

- (13:36) TCU – Jon Denman 5-yard run (Kyle Lemmermann kick) (9 plays, 69 yards, 3:55; TCU 7–3)
- (9:57) USC – King Miller 2-yard run (Ryon Sayeri kick) (7 plays, 75 yards, 3:39; USC 10–7)
- (4:58) TCU – Ken Seals 1-yard run (Kyle Lemmermann kick) (13 plays, 75 yards, 4:59; TCU 14–10)
- (0:18) USC – Ryon Sayeri 28-yard field goal (10 plays, 64 yards, 4:40; TCU 14–13)

Third quarter

- (0:49) USC – Jaden Richardson 21-yard pass from Jayden Maiava (Jayden Maiava pass to Taniela Tupou for two-point conversion) (5 plays, 73 yards, 3:02; USC 21–14)

Fourth quarter

- (9:37) USC – Ryon Sayeri 41-yard field goal (8 plays, 46 yards, 5:05; USC 24–14)
- (4:24) TCU – Jeremy Payne 5-yard run (Kyle Lemmermann kick) (11 plays, 75 yards, 5:13; USC 24–21)
- (0:02) TCU – Kyle Lemmermann 27-yard field goal (13 plays, 59 yards, 2:44; Tied 24–24)

Overtime

- (OT) USC – Ryon Sayeri 22-yard field goal (6 plays, 20 yards; USC 27–24)
- (OT) TCU – Jeremy Payne 35-yard pass from Ken Seals (3 plays, 35 yards; TCU 30–27)

Statistics	USC	TCU
First downs	19	20
Plays–yards	63–392	71–375
Rushes–yards	33–112	31–117
Passing yards	280	258
Passing: Comp–Att–Int	18–30–2	29–40–1
Turnovers	2	1
Time of possession	31:52	28:08

Team	Category	Player	Statistics
USC	Passing	Jayden Maiava	18/30, 280 yards, TD, 2 INT
USC	Rushing	King Miller	25 carries, 99 yards, TD
USC	Receiving	Tanook Hines	6 receptions, 163 yards
TCU	Passing	Ken Seals	29/40, 258 yards, TD, INT
TCU	Rushing	Jeremy Payne	13 carries, 73 yards, TD
TCU	Receiving	Eric McAlister	8 receptions, 69 yards
