= 2025 Cincinnati Bearcats football team =

American college football season

2025 Cincinnati Bearcats football

Liberty Bowl, L 13–35 vs. Navy
- Conference: Big 12 Conference
- Record: 7–6 (5–4 Big 12)
- Head coach: Scott Satterfield (3rd season)
- Offensive coordinator: Brad Glenn (3rd season)
- Offensive scheme: Spread option
- Defensive coordinator: Tyson Veidt (2nd season)
- Co-defensive coordinator: Cortney Braswell (1st season)
- Base defense: 4–2–5
- Home stadium: Nippert Stadium

Uniform
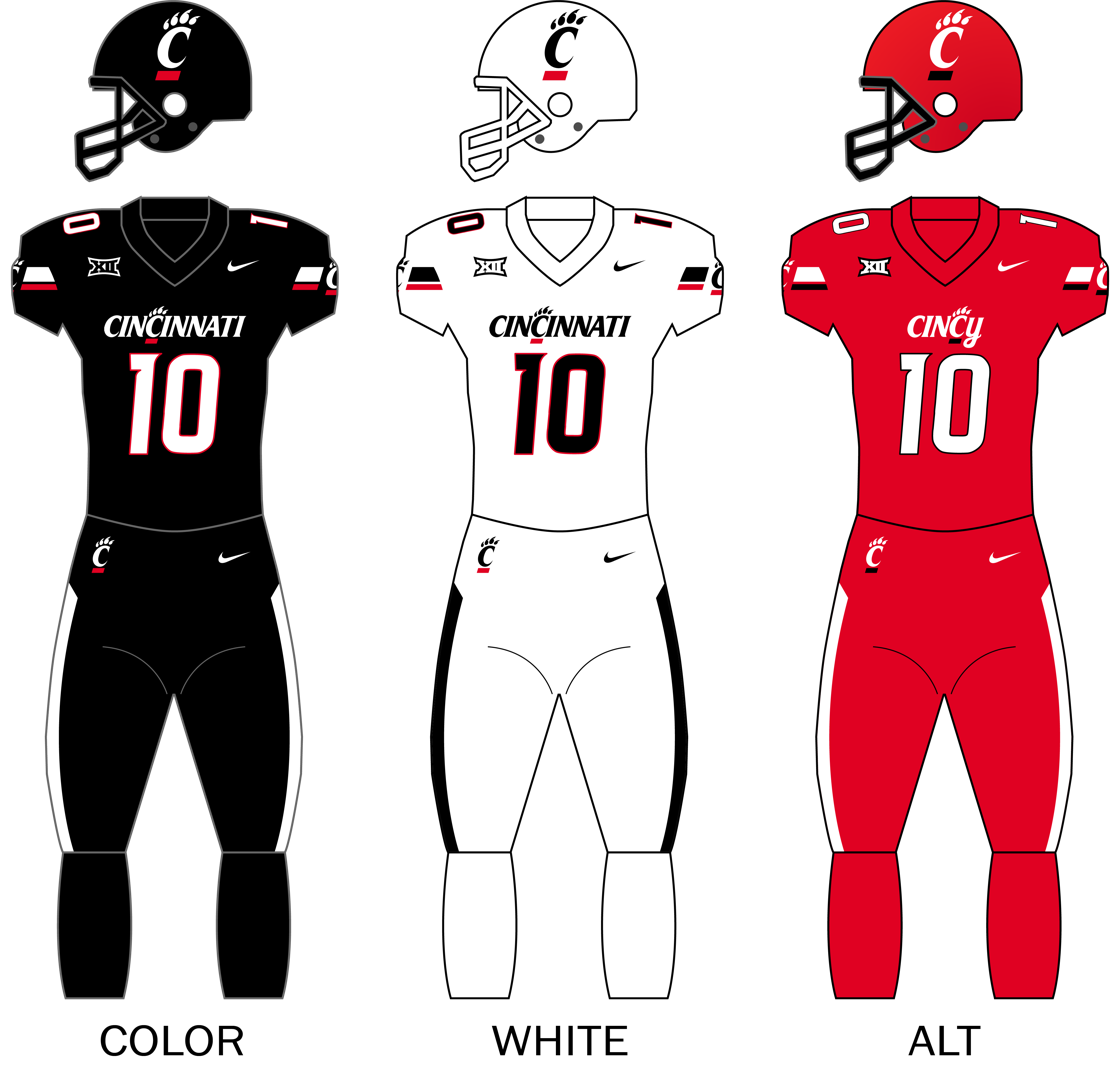

2025 Big 12 Conference football standings
	Conf.			Overall
Team	W		L	W		L
No. 7 Texas Tech y$^	8	–	1	12	–	2
No. 11 BYU y	8	–	1	12	–	2
No. 14 Utah	7	–	2	11	–	2
No. 22 Houston	6	–	3	10	–	3
Arizona	6	–	3	9	–	4
Arizona State	6	–	3	8	–	5
No. 25 TCU	5	–	4	9	–	4
Iowa State	5	–	4	8	–	4
Cincinnati	5	–	4	7	–	6
Kansas State	5	–	4	6	–	6
Baylor	3	–	6	5	–	7
Kansas	3	–	6	5	–	7
UCF	2	–	7	5	–	7
West Virginia	2	–	7	4	–	8
Colorado	1	–	8	3	–	9
Oklahoma State	0	–	9	1	–	11
Championship: Texas Tech 34, BYU 7
^ – College Football Playoff participant; $ – Conference champion; y – Championship game participant; Rankings from AP Poll

The 2025 Cincinnati Bearcats football team represented the University of Cincinnati during the 2025 NCAA Division I FBS football season. The Bearcats, members of the Big 12 Conference, played home games at Nippert Stadium in Cincinnati, Ohio. 2025 was the program's third season under head coach Scott Satterfield.

The Cincinnati Bearcats drew an average home attendance of 36,052.

== Offseason ==
=== Coaching staff changes ===
==== Departures ====
Departures
Name	Position	Reason for leaving	New school	New position
Kerry Coombs	Special teams and cornerbacks coach	Fired		
Nate Fuqua	Co-defensive coordinator and stars coach	Fired	Kentucky	Defensive Analyst/Outside Linebackers

==== Additions ====
Additions
Name	Position	Previous school	Previous position
Adam Braithwaite	Safeties	Samford	Defensive coordinator/safeties
Eddie Hicks	Cornerbacks	LSU	Analyst
Luke Paschall	Special teams	Middle Tennessee	Special teams

=== Recruiting ===
College recruiting (2025)
Name	Hometown	School	Height	Weight	Commit date
Zebulin Kinsey; QB	Wellsville, Ohio	Toronto Junior/Senior High School	6 ft 3 in (1.91 m)	215 lb (98 kg)	Nov 18, 2023
Zebulin Kinsey; QB	Recruit ratings: Rivals: 247Sports: ESPN:				
Zion Johnson; RB	Covington, Georgia	Newton High School	5 ft 8 in (1.73 m)	180 lb (82 kg)	Feb 8, 2024
Zion Johnson; RB	Recruit ratings: Rivals: 247Sports: ESPN:				
Giyahni Kontosis; WR	Upper Marlboro, Maryland	Riverdale Baptist School	6 ft 1 in (1.85 m)	195 lb (88 kg)	Jul 8, 2024
Giyahni Kontosis; WR	Recruit ratings: Rivals: 247Sports: ESPN:				
Ka’Maurri Smith; TE	Dayton, Ohio	Wayne High School	6 ft 5 in (1.96 m)	200 lb (91 kg)	Nov 19, 2023
Ka’Maurri Smith; TE	Recruit ratings: Rivals: 247Sports: ESPN:				
DaMari Witherspoon; TE	Dallas, Georgia	East Paulding High School	6 ft 5 in (1.96 m)	220 lb (100 kg)	Aug 27, 2024
DaMari Witherspoon; TE	Recruit ratings: Rivals: 247Sports: ESPN:				
Jeremiah Kelly; OL	Avon, Ohio	Avon High School	6 ft 3 in (1.91 m)	315 lb (143 kg)	Jun 21, 2024
Jeremiah Kelly; OL	Recruit ratings: Rivals: 247Sports: ESPN:				
Marcus McGregor; OL	West Des Moines, Iowa	Valley High School	6 ft 3 in (1.91 m)	280 lb (130 kg)	Dec 2, 2024
Marcus McGregor; OL	Recruit ratings: Rivals: 247Sports: ESPN:				
Cray Paich; OL	Northbrook, Illinois	Glenbrook North High School	6 ft 6 in (1.98 m)	290 lb (130 kg)	May 18, 2024
Cray Paich; OL	Recruit ratings: Rivals: 247Sports: ESPN:				
Zach Taylor; OL	Kingsland, Georgia	Camden County High School	6 ft 4 in (1.93 m)	300 lb (140 kg)	Sep 23, 2024
Zach Taylor; OL	Recruit ratings: Rivals: 247Sports: ESPN:				
James Early; DL	Fort Wayne, Indiana	North Side High School	6 ft 6 in (1.98 m)	230 lb (100 kg)	Oct 6, 2024
James Early; DL	Recruit ratings: Rivals: 247Sports: ESPN:				
Tim Griffin; DL	Covington, Georgia	Alcovy High School	6 ft 5 in (1.96 m)	255 lb (116 kg)	Nov 23, 2024
Tim Griffin; DL	Recruit ratings: Rivals: 247Sports: ESPN:				
CD McFee; DL	Elkhart, Indiana	Elkhart Memorial High School	6 ft 5 in (1.96 m)	296 lb (134 kg)	Sep 7, 2024
CD McFee; DL	Recruit ratings: Rivals: 247Sports: ESPN:				
Kamron Neal; DL	Smyrna, Georgia	Campbell High School	6 ft 4 in (1.93 m)	245 lb (111 kg)	Nov 11, 2024
Kamron Neal; DL	Recruit ratings: Rivals: 247Sports: ESPN:				
Myles Harrison; LB	Pickerington, Ohio	Pickerington High School Central	6 ft 3 in (1.91 m)	210 lb (95 kg)	Dec 3, 2024
Myles Harrison; LB	Recruit ratings: Rivals: 247Sports: ESPN:				
Terrell Holcomb; LB	Gahanna, Ohio	Gahanna-Lincoln High School	6 ft 3 in (1.91 m)	205 lb (93 kg)	Jun 17, 2024
Terrell Holcomb; LB	Recruit ratings: Rivals: 247Sports: ESPN:				
Patrick Williams; CB	Greenville, South Carolina	Rabun Gap-Nacoochee School	5 ft 10 in (1.78 m)	160 lb (73 kg)	Dec 25, 2023
Patrick Williams; CB	Recruit ratings: Rivals: 247Sports: ESPN:				
Jamari Johnson; S	Birmingham, Alabama	Pell City High School	6 ft 0 in (1.83 m)	165 lb (75 kg)	Dec 4, 2024
Jamari Johnson; S	Recruit ratings: Rivals: 247Sports: ESPN:				
CJ Jones; S	Bolingbrook, Illinois	Bolingbrook High School	5 ft 11 in (1.80 m)	180 lb (82 kg)	Apr 23, 2024
CJ Jones; S	Recruit ratings: Rivals: 247Sports: ESPN:				
CJ Crite; Star	Chesapeake, Virginia	Oscar F. Smith High School	6 ft 1 in (1.85 m)	195 lb (88 kg)	Jun 8, 2024
CJ Crite; Star	Recruit ratings: Rivals: 247Sports: ESPN:				
Overall recruit ranking:
Note: In many cases, Scout, Rivals, 247Sports, On3, and ESPN may conflict in their listings of height and weight.; In these cases, the average was taken. ESPN grades are on a 100-point scale.; Sources: "2025 Cincinnati Football Commitment List". Rivals.; "2025 Players Commitments – Cincinnati". ESPN.; "2025 Team Ranking". Rivals.com.; "2025 Cincinnati Bearcats football team". 247Sports.

=== Transfers ===
==== Players leaving ====
Departing transfers
Name	Pos.	Height	Weight	Year	Hometown	New school
Caleb Schmitz	TE	6'3"	240	(redshirt) Junior	Lancaster, PA	Illinois State
Kalen Carroll	CB	5' 11"	161	(redshirt) Sophomore	Brownsburg, IN	Central Michigan
D.J. Taylor	DB	5'10"	195	(redshirt) Senior	Tampa, FL	
Aaron Turner	WR	5'8"	185	(redshirt) Senior	Washington, D.C.	Rice
Sterling Berkhalter	WR	6'3"	200	(redshirt) Junior	Cincinnati, OH	Wake Forest
Carter Brown	PK	6'0"	198	Junior	Pearland, TX	Utah State
Ben Mehan	P	6'0"	180	Freshman	Downingtown, PA	East Texas A&M
Garrison Butler	DL	6'1"	280	Freshman	Jacksonville, FL	Appalachian State
Jonathan Harder	OL	6'4"	330	(redshirt) Sophomore	Delaware, OH	Toledo
Michael Mussari	WR	6'1"	200	(redshirt) Freshman	Kings Mills, OH	Dayton
Kameron Wilson	DL	6'2"	250	(redshirt) Junior	Decatur, GA	Miami (Ohio)
Brady Drogosh	CB	6'4"	220	(redshirt) Freshman	Warren, MI	Grand Valley State
Quinton Price	CB	6'3"	180	Freshman	Cincinnati, OH	Thomas More
Jordan Young	CB	6'0"	197	(redshirt) Junior	Tampa, FL	Arkansas
Tyrin Smith	WR	5'7"	165	(redshirt) Senior	Cibolo, TX	Texas State
Ken Willis	S	5'11"	188	(redshirt) Sophomore	Cincinnati, OH	
Jordan Robinson	CB	6'4"	210	Junior	Columbia, SC	Virginia
Tony Johnson	WR	5'11"	185	(redshirt) Senior	Ocala, FL	Miami (FL)

==== Incoming transfers ====
Cincinnati incoming transfers
Name	Pos.	Height	Weight	Year	Hometown	Prev. school
Taran Tyo	OL	6'4	326	(redshirt) Junior	Greenville, Ohio	Ball State
Matthew McDoom	CB	5'8	160	Junior	Winter Garden, Florida	Coastal Carolina
Jaylon White-McClain	DE	6'4	254	(redshirt) Junior	Virginia Beach, Virginia	Old Dominion
Caleb Goodie	WR	6'1	170	Junior	Breaux Bridge, Louisiana	Colorado State
Cyrus Allen	WR	6'0	170	Senior	New Orleans, Louisiana	Texas A&M
Nolan Latulippe	OL	6'7	281	Senior	Aylmer, Quebec	Albany
Jeff Caldwell	WR	6'5	200	Junior	Louisville, Kentucky	Lindenwood
Stephen Rusnak	PK	6'5	200	(redshirt) Senior	Clarkston, Michigan	Charlotte
Tayden Barnes	S	5'10	185	(redshirt) Sophomore	Amarillo, Texas	New Mexico State
CJ McRay	DL	6'4	241	(redshirt) Senior	Lumberton, North Carolina	Virginia Tech
Xavier Williams	S	6'2	215	(redshirt) Senior	McDonough, Georgia	Middle Tennessee
Tawee Walker	RB	5'9	218	(redshirt) Senior	North Las Vegas, Nevada	Wisconsin
Christian Harrison	DB	6'1	191	(redshirt) Junior	Atlanta, Georgia	Tennessee
Joe Cotton	OT	6'7	315	(redshirt) Junior	Sioux Falls, South Dakota	South Dakota
Darrell Gipson	DB	6'3	235	Sophomore	Lacey, Washington	Idaho State
Isaiah Rogers	DT	6'2	300	(redshirt) Senior	Sharon Hill, Pennsylvania	Monmouth
Elijah Gunn	DT	6'3	290	(redshirt) Sophomore	La Grange, Georgia	Tennessee

=== New uniforms ===
On July 2, the Bearcats announced a new football uniform set due to a renewed partnership with Nike.

=== Return of red and black stands ===
On September 18, the Bearcats announced plans to "stripe the stands" in red and black for their October 4 home game against Iowa State, coloring them in both colors for the first time since the 2016 season.

=== 2025 NFL draft ===
Round	Pick	NFL team	Player	Position
7	250	Green Bay Packers	John Williams	OT

==== Undrafted free agents ====
The following Cincinnati Bearcats players were NFL undrafted free agent signees following the 2025 NFL Draft

NFL team	Player	Position
Carolina Panthers	Luke Kandra	OT
Cincinnati Bengals	Jamoi Mayes	WR
Cleveland Browns	Dartanyan Tinsley	OT
New England Patriots	Josh Minkins	S
New York Jets	Jared Bartlett	LB
San Francisco 49ers	Corey Kiner	RB

== Schedule ==
Date	Time	Opponent	Rank	Site	TV	Result	Attendance
August 28, 2025	9:00 p.m.	vs. Nebraska*		Arrowhead Stadium; Kansas City, MO	ESPN	L 17–20	72,884
September 6	3:30 p.m.	Bowling Green*		Nippert Stadium; Cincinnati, OH	ESPN+	W 34–20	35,421
September 13	3:30 p.m.	Northwestern State*		Nippert Stadium; Cincinnati, OH	ESPN+	W 70–0	30,014
September 27	12:00 p.m.	at Kansas		David Booth Kansas Memorial Stadium; Lawrence, KS	TNT	W 37–34	41,525
October 4	12:00 p.m.	No. 14 Iowa State		Nippert Stadium; Cincinnati, OH	ESPN2	W 38–30	38,007
October 11	12:00 p.m.	UCF		Nippert Stadium; Cincinnati, OH (rivalry)	FS1	W 20–11	35,782
October 18	8:00 p.m.	at Oklahoma State	No. 24	Boone Pickens Stadium; Stillwater, OK	ESPN2	W 49–17	46,901
October 25	4:00 p.m.	Baylor^{†}	No. 21	Nippert Stadium; Cincinnati, OH	ESPN2	W 41–20	38,007
November 1	10:15 p.m.	at No. 24 Utah	No. 17	Rice–Eccles Stadium; Salt Lake City, UT (College GameDay)	ESPN	L 14–45	51,672
November 15	12:00 p.m.	Arizona	No. 25	Nippert Stadium; Cincinnati, OH	FS1	L 24–30	37,099
November 22	8:00 p.m.	No. 11 BYU		Nippert Stadium; Cincinnati, OH (Big Noon Kickoff)	FOX	L 14–26	38,034
November 29	3:30 p.m.	at TCU		Amon G. Carter Stadium; Fort Worth, TX	FOX	L 23–45	37,259
January 2, 2026	4:30 p.m.	vs. Navy*		Simmons Bank Liberty Stadium; Memphis, TN (Liberty Bowl)	ESPN	L 13–35	21,908
*Non-conference game; ^{†}Homecoming; Rankings from AP Poll (and CFP Rankings, after November 4) - Released prior to game; All times are in Eastern time; Source:

== Game summaries ==
=== vs. Nebraska ===
Nebraska Cornhuskers (0–0) vs. Cincinnati Bearcats (0–0) – Game summary

Quarter	1	2	3	4	Total
Cornhuskers	0	13	0	7	20
Bearcats	3	0	7	7	17

at Arrowhead Stadium • Kansas City, Missouri

- Date: August 28
- Game time: 9:00 p.m.
- Game weather: Sunny, 78 degrees, Wind E @ 6 mph
- Game attendance: 72,884
- Referee: David Alvarez
- TV announcers (ESPN): Mark Jones (play-by-play), Roddy Jones (analyst), and Quint Kessenich (sideline)

Game information

First quarter

- (4:47) CIN – Stephen Rusnak 45-yard field goal (Drive: 8 plays, 38 yards, 4:13, Cincinnati 3-0)

Second quarter

- (14:56) NEB - Kyle Cunanan 52-yard field goal (Drive: 11 plays, 42 yards, 4:51, 3-3)
- (5:36) NEB - Kyle Cunanan 22-yard field goal (Drive: 16 plays, 80 yards, 7:51, Nebraska 6-3)
- (0:11) NEB - Nyziah Hunter 5-yard pass from Dylan Raiola, Kyle Cunanan kick (Drive: 3 plays, 24 yards, 0:51, Nebraska 13-3)

Third quarter

- (6:53) CIN – Brendan Sorsby 7-yard run, Stephen Rusnak kick (Drive: 10 plays, 57 yards, 3:32, Nebraska 13-10)

Fourth quarter

- (10:36) NEB – Dane Key 3-yard pass from Dylan Raiola, Kyle Cunanan kick (Drive: 13 plays, 67 yards, 7:02, Nebraska 20-10)
- (7:15) CIN – Brendan Sorsby 1-yard run, Stephen Rusnak kick (Drive: 9 plays, 75 yards, 3:21, Nebraska 20-17)

Statistics	NEB	CIN
First downs	23	16
Plays–yards	78–353	55–271
Rushes–yards	36–110	30–202
Passing yards	243	69
Passing: comp–att–int	33–42–0	13–25–1
Turnovers	0	2
Time of possession	39:30	20:30

Team	Category	Player	Statistics
Nebraska	Passing	Dylan Raiola	33/42, 243 yards, 2 TD
Nebraska	Rushing	Emmett Johnson	25 carries, 108 yards
Nebraska	Receiving	Nyziah Hunter	6 receptions, 65 yards, TD
Cincinnati	Passing	Brendan Sorsby	13/25, 69 yards, INT
Cincinnati	Rushing	Brendan Sorsby	13 carries, 96 yards, 2 TD
Cincinnati	Receiving	Cyrus Allen	5 receptions, 41 yards

=== vs Bowling Green ===
Bowling Green Falcons (1–0) at Cincinnati Bearcats (0–1) – Game summary

Quarter	1	2	3	4	Total
Falcons	0	3	7	10	20
Bearcats	7	14	10	3	34

at Nippert Stadium • Cincinnati, Ohio

- Date: September 6
- Game time: 3:30 p.m.
- Game attendance: 35,421
- Referee: Kevin Mar
- TV announcers (ESPN+): James Westling (play-by-play), Leger Douzable (analyst), and Shane Sparks (sideline)

Game information

First quarter

- CIN – Cyrus Allen 44-yard pass from Brendan Sorsby (Stephen Rusnak kick), 7:23. Bearcats 7–0. Drive: 3 plays, 64 yards, 1:00.

Second quarter

- CIN – Cyrus Allen 2-yard pass from Brendan Sorsby (Stephen Rusnak kick), 13:17. Bearcats 14–0. Drive: 7 plays, 65 yards, 2:55.
- CIN – Jeff Caldwell 9-yard from Brendan Sorsby (Stephen Rusnak kick), 6:11. Bearcats 21–0. Drive: 7 plays, 89 yards, 3:08.
- BGSU – Jackson Kleather 25-yard field goal, 0:23. Bearcats 21–3. Drive: 18 plays, 68 yards, 5:48.

Third quarter

- CIN – Stephen Rusnak 40-yard field goal, 12:58. Bearcats 24–3. Drive: 6 plays, 55 yards, 1:58.
- BGSU – Jyrin Johnson 31-yard pass from Drew Pyne (Jackson Kleather kick), 4:03. Bearcats 24–10. Drive: 2 plays, 34 yards, 0:47.
- CIN – Brendan Sorsby 9-yard run (Stephen Rusnak kick), 0:24. Bearcats 31–10. Drive: 8 plays, 75 yards, 3:39.

Fourth quarter

- BGSU – Mar'Kel Porter 1-yard run (Jackson Kleather kick), 10:35. Bearcats 31–17. Drive: 8 plays, 65 yards, 4:49.
- CIN – Stephen Rusnak 23-yard field goal, 6:12. Bearcats 34–17. Drive: 10 plays, 60 yards, 4:23.
- BGSU – Jackson Kleather 30-yard field goal, 1:55. Bearcats 34–20. Drive: 10 plays, 63 yards, 4:17.

Statistics	BGSU	CIN
First downs	21	18
Plays–yards	71–372	53–439
Rushes–yards	34–98	29–106
Passing yards	274	333
Passing: comp–att–int	29–37–0	17–24–0
Turnovers	0	1
Time of possession	37:11	22:49

Team	Category	Player	Statistics
Bowling Green	Passing	Drew Pyne	29/36, 274 yards, TD
Bowling Green	Rushing	Cameron Pettaway	13 carries, 72 yards
Bowling Green	Receiving	Jyrin Johnson	7 receptions, 80 yards, TD
Cincinnati	Passing	Brendan Sorsby	17/24, 333 yards, 3 TD
Cincinnati	Rushing	Brendan Sorsby	7 carries, 40 yards, TD
Cincinnati	Receiving	Jeff Caldwell	5 receptions, 109 yards, TD

=== vs Northwestern State (FCS) ===
Northwestern State Demons (FCS) (1–1) at Cincinnati Bearcats (1–1) – Game summary

Quarter	1	2	3	4	Total
Demons (FCS)	0	0	0	0	0
Bearcats	35	21	7	7	70

at Nippert Stadium • Cincinnati, Ohio

- Date: September 13
- Game time: 3:30 p.m.
- Game weather: Sunny • Temperature: 85 °F (29 °C) • Wind: W 7 mph
- Game attendance: 30,014
- Referee: Henry Johns
- TV announcers (ESPN+): Shawn Kenney (play-by-play) and Jeff Woody (analyst)

Game information

First quarter

- (13:24) CIN – Joe Royer 21-yard pass from Brendan Sorsby, Stephen Rusnak kick (Drive: 4 plays, 65 yards, 1:36; Cincinnati 7–0)
- (11:18) CIN – Caleb Goodie 55-yard pass from Brendan Sorsby, Stephen Rusnak kick (Drive: 1 play, 55 yards, 0:09; Cincinnati 14–0)
- (7:07) CIN – Tawee Walker 10-yard pass from Brendan Sorsby, Stephen Rusnak kick (Drive: 4 plays, 42 yards, 1:43; Cincinnati 21–0)
- (4:11) CIN – Joe Royer 2-yard pass from Brendan Sorsby, Stephen Rusnak kick (Drive: 3 plays, 45 yards, 1:14; Cincinnati 28–0)
- (2:46) CIN – Isaiah Johnson 8-yard pass from Brendan Sorsby, Stephen Rusnak kick (Drive: 2 plays, 30 yards, 0:30; Cincinnati 35–0)

Second quarter

- (9:40) CIN – Brendan Sorsby 23-yard run, Stephen Rusnak kick (Drive: 8 plays, 80 yards, 3:41; Cincinnati 42–0)
- (5:38) CIN – Tawee Walker 15-yard run, Stephen Rusnak kick (Drive: 6 plays, 67 yards, 2:26; Cincinnati 49–0)
- (0:16) CIN – Cyrus Allen 29-yard pass from Brady Lichtenberg, Stephen Rusnak kick (Drive: 3 plays, 53 yards, 0:43; Cincinnati 56–0)

Third quarter

- (4:14) CIN – Chance Williams 3-yard run, Dino Beslagic kick (Drive: 7 plays, 70 yards, 3:32; Cincinnati 63–0)

Fourth quarter

- (5:00) CIN – Isaiah Johnson 42-yard pass from Samaj Jones, Dino Beslagic kick (Drive: 5 plays, 69 yards, 2:45; Cincinnati 70–0)

Statistics	NWST	CIN
First downs	6	27
Plays–yards	51–102	49–605
Rushes–yards	35–68	26–243
Passing yards	34	362
Passing: comp–att–int	10–16–0	21–23–0
Turnovers	1	0
Time of possession	39:15	20:45

Team	Category	Player	Statistics
Northwestern State	Passing	Abram Johnston	7/11, 32 yards
Northwestern State	Rushing	Kolbe Burrell	12 carries, 31 yards
Northwestern State	Receiving	Luke Carter	1 reception, 11 yards
Cincinnati	Passing	Brendan Sorsby	15/15, 253 yards, 5 TD
Cincinnati	Rushing	Tawee Walker	6 carries, 66 yards, TD
Cincinnati	Receiving	Caleb Goodie	3 receptions, 106 yards, TD

=== at Kansas ===
Cincinnati Bearcats (2–1) at Kansas Jayhawks (3–1) – Game summary

Quarter	1	2	3	4	Total
Bearcats	7	13	10	7	37
Jayhawks	7	6	14	7	34

at David Booth Kansas Memorial Stadium • Lawrence, Kansas

- Date: September 27
- Game time: 12:00 p.m.
- Game weather: Sunny • Temperature: 77 °F (25 °C) • Wind: SW 7 mph
- Game attendance: 41,525
- Referee: Tutashinda Salaam
- TV announcers (TNT): J.B. Long (play-by-play), Mike Golic Jr. (analyst), and Lauren Jbara (sideline)

Game information

First quarter

- KU – Emmanuel Henderson 93-yard pass from Jalon Daniels (Laith Marjan kick), 11:42. Jayhawks 7–0. Drive: 1 play, 93 yards, 0:11.
- CIN – Tawee Walker 2-yard run (Stephen Rusnak kick), 6:10. Tied 7–7. Drive: 13 plays, 75 yards, 5:32.

Second quarter

- CIN – Stephen Rusnak 29-yard field goal, 14:23. Bearcats 10–7. Drive: 11 plays, 61 yards, 5:25.
- KU – Laith Marjan 27-yard field goal, 10:00. Tied 10–10. Drive: 9 plays, 67 yards, 4:23.
- CIN – Cyrus Allen 10-yard pass from Brendan Sorsby (Stephen Rusnak kick), 7:09. Bearcats 17–10. Drive: 7 plays, 75 yards, 2:51.
- KU – Laith Marjan 35-yard field goal, 3:15. Bearcats 17–13. Drive: 8 plays, 58 yards, 3:54.
- CIN – Stephen Rusnak 43-yard field goal, 0:00. Bearcats 20–13. Drive: 7 plays, 69 yards, 0:47.

Third quarter

- KU – Boden Groen 24-yard pass from Jalon Daniels (Laith Marjan kick), 11:38. Tied 20–20. Drive: 8 plays, 75 yards, 3:22.
- CIN – Cyrus Allen 14-yard pass from Brendan Sorsby (Stephen Rusnak kick), 8:54. Bearcats 27–20. Drive: 5 plays, 82 yards, 2:38.
- KU – Emmanuel Henderson 75-yard pass from Jalon Daniels (Laith Marjan kick), 8:44. Tied 27–27. Drive: 1 play, 75 yards, 0:10.
- CIN – Stephen Rusnak 24-yard field goal, 1:24. Bearcats 30–27. Drive: 14 plays, 69 yards, 7:20.

Fourth quarter

- KU – Levi Wentz 6-yard pass from Jalon Daniels (Laith Marjan kick), 1:45. Jayhawks 34–30. Drive: 12 plays, 85 yards, 6:17.
- CIN – Tawee Walker 2-yard run (Stephen Rusnak kick), 0:29. Bearcats 37–34. Drive: 10 plays, 75 yards, 1:16.

Statistics	CIN	KU
First downs	29	26
Plays–yards	81–603	55–597
Rushes–yards	37–215	27–152
Passing yards	388	455
Passing: comp–att–int	29–44–0	19–28–0
Turnovers	0	1
Time of possession	34:36	25:24

Team	Category	Player	Statistics
Cincinnati	Passing	Brendan Sorsby	29/43, 388 yards, 2 TD
Cincinnati	Rushing	Evan Pryor	6 carries, 90 yards
Cincinnati	Receiving	Cyrus Allen	11 receptions, 128 yards, 2 TD
Kansas	Passing	Jalon Daniels	19/28, 445 yards, 4 TD
Kansas	Rushing	Leshon Williams	10 carries, 64 yards
Kansas	Receiving	Emmanuel Henderson	5 receptions, 214 yards, 2 TD

=== vs No. 14 Iowa State ===
No. 14 Iowa State Cyclones (5–0) at Cincinnati Bearcats (3–1) – Game summary

Quarter	1	2	3	4	Total
No. 14 Cyclones	0	15	7	8	30
Bearcats	17	14	0	7	38

at Nippert Stadium • Cincinnati, Ohio

- Date: October 4
- Game time: 12:00 p.m.
- Game weather: Sunny, 78 °F (26 °C)
- Game attendance: 38,007
- Referee: Kevin Boitmann
- TV announcers (ESPN2): Roy Philpott (play-by-play), Sam Acho (analyst), and Taylor Davis (sideline)

Game information

First quarter

- CIN – Evan Pryor 30-yard run (Stephen Rusnak kick), 12:25. Bearcats 7–0. Drive: 6 plays, 80 yards, 2:28.
- CIN – Stephen Rusnak 38-yard field goal, 7:54. Bearcats 10–0. Drive: 8 plays, 62 yards, 2:05.
- CIN – Joe Royer 12-yard pass from Brendan Sorsby (Stephen Rusnak kick), 0:23. Bearcats 17–0. Drive: 9 plays, 70 yards, 3:38.

Second quarter

- ISU – Rocco Becht 14-yard run (Chase Smith kick), 14:55. Bearcats 17–7. Drive: 3 plays, 75 yards, 0:28.
- CIN – Evan Pryor 18-yard run (Stephen Rusnak kick), 13:40. Bearcats 24–7. Drive: 4 plays, 55 yards, 1:06.
- CIN – Brendan Sorsby 20-yard run (Stephen Rusnak kick), 1:08. Bearcats 31–7. Drive: 13 plays, 80 yards, 5:20.
- ISU – Rocco Becht 4-yard run (Major Cantrell pass to Benjamin Brahmer), 0:00. Bearcats 31–15. Drive: 6 plays, 75 yards, 1:08.

Third quarter

- ISU – Brett Eskildsen 11-yard pass from Rocco Becht (Chase Smith kick), 8:06. Bearcats 31–22. Drive: 14 plays, 75 yards, 6:54.

Fourth quarter

- CIN – Caleb Goodie 82-yard pass from Brendan Sorsby (Stephen Rusnak kick), 5:57. Bearcats 38–22. Drive: 3 plays, 84 yards, 1:43.
- ISU – Chase Sowell 3-yard pass from Rocco Becht (Rocco Becht pass to Benjamin Brahmer), 1:56. Bearcats 38–30. Drive: 13 plays, 75 yards, 4:01.

Statistics	ISU	CIN
First downs	29	20
Plays–yards	85–470	59–474
Rushes–yards	37–156	34–260
Passing yards	314	214
Passing: comp–att–int	30–48–0	13–25–0
Turnovers	0	1
Time of possession	34:56	25:04

Team	Category	Player	Statistics
Iowa State	Passing	Rocco Becht	30/48, 314 yards, 2 TD
Iowa State	Rushing	Abu Sama	18 carries, 96 yards
Iowa State	Receiving	Brett Eskildsen	8 receptions, 105 yards, TD
Cincinnati	Passing	Brendan Sorsby	13/25, 214 yards, 2 TD
Cincinnati	Rushing	Evan Pryor	10 carries, 111 yards, 2 TD
Cincinnati	Receiving	Caleb Goodie	2 receptions, 83 yards, TD

=== vs UCF (rivalry) ===
UCF Knights (3–2) at Cincinnati Bearcats (4–1) – Game summary

Quarter	1	2	3	4	Total
Knights	0	3	0	8	11
Bearcats	7	10	0	3	20

at Nippert Stadium • Cincinnati, Ohio

- Date: October 11
- Game time: 12:00 p.m.
- Game weather: Sunny, 65 °F (18 °C)
- Game attendance: 35,782
- Referee: Mike McCabe
- TV announcers (FS1): Dan Hellie (play-by-play) and Petros Papadakis (analyst)

Game information

First quarter

- CIN – Jeff Caldwell 40-yard pass from Brendan Sorsby (Stephen Rusnak kick), 8:23. Bearcats 7–0. Drive: 4 plays, 59 yards, 1:26.

Second quarter

- CIN – Jeff Caldwell 9-yard pass from Brendan Sorsby (Stephen Rusnak kick), 12:12. Bearcats 14–0. Drive: 9 plays, 83 yards, 3:47.
- CIN – Stephen Rusnak 32-yard field goal, 4:13. Bearcats 17–0. Drive: 13 plays, 39 yards, 5:18.
- UCF – Noe Ruelas 45-yard field goal, 0:24. Bearcats 17–3. Drive: 12 plays, 49 yards, 3:49.

Third quarter

- No scoring plays.

Fourth quarter

- CIN – Stephen Rusnak 24-yard field goal, 13:39. Bearcats 20–3. Drive: 7 plays, 82 yards, 3:16.
- UCF – Cam Francher 3-yard run (Cam Francher pass to Chris Domercant), 2:07. Bearcats 20–11. Drive: 19 plays, 90 yards, 7:00.

Statistics	UCF	CIN
First downs	26	14
Plays–yards	90–413	48–306
Rushes–yards	41–191	27–115
Passing yards	222	191
Passing: comp–att–int	28–49–0	12–21–0
Turnovers	1	0
Time of possession	39:44	20:16

Team	Category	Player	Statistics
UCF	Passing	Cam Fancher	28/49, 222 yards
UCF	Rushing	Cam Fancher	20 carries, 108 yards, TD
UCF	Receiving	Dylan Wade	5 receptions, 55 yards
Cincinnati	Passing	Brendan Sorsby	12/21, 191 yards, 2 TD
Cincinnati	Rushing	Evan Pryor	11 carries, 48 yards
Cincinnati	Receiving	Joe Royer	2 receptions, 83 yards

=== at Oklahoma State ===
No. 24 Cincinnati Bearcats (5–1) at Oklahoma State Cowboys (1–5) – Game summary

Quarter	1	2	3	4	Total
No. 24 Bearcats	7	21	0	21	49
Cowboys	3	7	7	0	17

at Boone Pickens Stadium • Stillwater, Oklahoma

- Date: October 18
- Game time: 8:00 p.m.
- Game weather: Sunny • Temperature: 70 °F (21 °C) • Wind: N at 7 mph (11 km/h)
- Game attendance: 46,901
- Referee: Michael VanderVelde
- TV announcers (ESPN2): Mike Monaco (play-by-play), Kirk Morrison (analyst), and Dawn Davenport (sideline)

Game information

First quarter

- (11:54) CIN – Cyrus Allen 26-yard pass from Brendan Sorsby, Stephen Rusnak kick (Drive: 5 plays, 79 yards, 1:58; CIN 7–0)
- (4:10) OKST – Logan Ward 40-yard field goal (Drive: 15 plays, 69 yards, 7:40; CIN 7–3)

Second quarter

- (14:54) CIN – Cyrus Allen 14-yard pass from Brendan Sorsby, Stephen Rusnak kick (Drive: 9 plays, 71 yards, 4:11; CIN 14–3)
- (11:12) OKST – Sam Jackson V 6-yard run, Logan Ward kick (Drive: 7 plays, 75 yards, 3:42; CIN 14–10)
- (8:44) CIN – Joe Royer 27-yard pass from Brendan Sorsby, Stephen Rusnak kick (Drive: 8 plays, 86 yards, 2:25; CIN 21–10)
- (0:13) CIN – Cyrus Allen 12-yard pass from Brendan Sorsby, Stephen Rusnak kick (Drive: 12 plays, 94 yards, 2:15; CIN 28–10)

Third quarter

- (10:39) OKST – Rodney Fields Jr. 20-yard run, Logan Ward kick (Drive: 5 plays, 62 yards, 2:27; CIN 28–17)

Fourth quarter

- (13:21) CIN – Brendan Sorsby 1-yard run, Stephen Rusnak kick (Drive: 12 plays, 95 yards, 4:05; CIN 35–17)
- (6:05) CIN – Matthew McDoom 100-yard interception return, Stephen Rusnak kick (CIN 42–17)
- (4:39) CIN – Manny Covey 9-yard run, Stephen Rusnak kick (Drive: 2 plays, 13 yards, 0:32; CIN 49–17)

Statistics	CIN	OKST
First downs	26	21
Plays–yards	60–427	67–377
Rushes–yards	30–143	48–228
Passing yards	284	149
Passing: comp–att–int	21–30–0	11–19–1
Turnovers	0	2
Time of possession	23:18	36:42

Team	Category	Player	Statistics
Cincinnati	Passing	Brendan Sorsby	21/30, 284 yards, 4 TD
Cincinnati	Rushing	Evan Pryor	9 carries, 63 yards
Cincinnati	Receiving	Joe Royer	5 receptions, 63 yards, TD
Oklahoma State	Passing	Sam Jackson V	11/19, 149 yards, INT
Oklahoma State	Rushing	Rodney Fields Jr.	21 carries, 163 yards, TD
Oklahoma State	Receiving	Shamar Rigby	1 reception, 48 yards

=== vs Baylor ===
Baylor Bears (4–3) at No. 21 Cincinnati Bearcats (6–1) – Game summary

Quarter	1	2	3	4	Total
Bears	0	6	6	8	20
No. 21 Bearcats	14	10	3	14	41

at Nippert Stadium • Cincinnati, Ohio

- Date: October 25
- Game time: 4:00 p.m.
- Game weather: Cloudy • Temperature: 55 °F (13 °C) • Wind: NE at 6 miles per hour (9.7 km/h)
- Game attendance: 38,007
- Referee: Tutashinda Salaam
- TV announcers (ESPN2): Mike Monaco (play-by-play), Kirk Morrison (analyst), and Dawn Davenport (sideline)

Game information

First quarter

- (9:52) CIN – Tawee Walker 1-yard run, Stephen Rusnak kick (Drive: 11 plays, 81 yards, 5:03; Cincinnati 7–0)
- (1:22) CIN – Evan Pryor 5-yard run, Stephen Rusnak kick (Drive: 10 plays, 66 yards, 4:50; Cincinnati 14–0)

Second quarter

- (5:42) CIN – Stephen Rusnak 46-yard field goal (Drive: 9 plays, 27 yards, 3:19; Cincinnati 17–0)
- (2:34) CIN – Cyrus Allen 6-yard pass from Brendan Sorsby, Stephen Rusnak kick (Drive: 6 plays, 29 yards, 3:01; Cincinnati 24–0)
- (0:16) BAY – Michael Trigg 6-yard pass from Sawyer Robertson (Drive: 11 plays, 75 yards, 2:18; Cincinnati 24–6)

Third quarter

- (10:36) BAY – Josh Cameron 9-yard pass from Sawyer Robertson (Drive: 10 plays, 80 yards, 4:19; Cincinnati 24–12)
- (5:15) CIN – Stephen Rusnak 36-yard field goal (Drive: 12 plays, 57 yards, 5:21; Cincinnati 27–12)

Fourth quarter

- (13:34) BAY – Sawyer Robertson 1-yard run, Michael Turner rush (Drive: 13 plays, 75 yards, 6:41; Cincinnati 27–20)
- (6:13) CIN – Brendan Sorsby 23-yard run, Stephen Rusnak kick (Drive: 12 plays, 75 yards, 7:21; Cincinnati 34–20)
- (4:26) CIN – Isaiah Johnson 8-yard pass from Brendan Sorsby, Stephen Rusnak kick (Drive: 3 plays, 17 yards, 1:38; Cincinnati 41–20)

Statistics	BAY	CIN
First downs	17	26
Plays–yards	58–266	71–376
Rushes–yards	32–129	50–265
Passing yards	137	111
Passing: comp–att–int	18–26–0	13–21–0
Turnovers	2	0
Time of possession	24:54	35:06

Team	Category	Player	Statistics
Baylor	Passing	Sawyer Robertson	18/26, 137 yards, 2 TD
Baylor	Rushing	Michael Turner	14 carries, 90 yards
Baylor	Receiving	Josh Cameron	4 receptions, 34 yards, TD
Cincinnati	Passing	Brendan Sorsby	13/21, 111 yards, 2 TD
Cincinnati	Rushing	Brendan Sorsby	11 carries, 85 yards, TD
Cincinnati	Receiving	Cyrus Allen	3 receptions, 36 yards, TD

=== at No. 24 Utah ===
No. 17 Cincinnati Bearcats (7–1) at No. 24 Utah Utes (6–2) – Game summary

Quarter	1	2	3	4	Total
No. 17 Bearcats	7	0	7	0	14
No. 24 Utes	14	10	14	7	45

at Rice–Eccles Stadium • Salt Lake City, Utah

- Date: November 1
- Game time: 10:15 p.m.
- Game weather: Clear • Temperature: 58 °F (14 °C) • Wind: NE @ 5 mph
- Game attendance: 51,672
- Referee: Luke Richmond
- TV announcers (ESPN): Dave Pasch (play-by-play), Dusty Dvoracek (analyst), and Taylor McGregor (sideline)

Game information

First quarter

- UTAH – Ryan Davis 34-yard pass from Devon Dampier (Dillon Curtis kick), 7:05. Utes 7–0. Drive: 16 plays, 94 yards, 7:07.
- CIN – Brendan Sorsby 22-yard run (Stephen Rusnak kick), 3:53. Tied 7–7. Drive: 8 plays, 75 yards, 3:12.
- UTAH – Wayshawn Parker 39-yard run (Dillon Curtis kick), 1:01. Utes 14–7. Drive: 7 plays, 75 yards, 2:52.

Second quarter

- UTAH – Dillon Curtis 33-yard field goal, 4:23. Utes 17–7. Drive: 13 plays, 66 yards, 5:53.
- UTAH – NaQuari Rogers 1-yard run (Dillon Curtis kick), 1:19. Utes 24–7. Drive: 6 plays, 70 yards, 2:25.

Third quarter

- CIN – Cyrus Allen 88-yard pass from Brendan Sorsby (Stephen Rusnak kick), 10:35. Utes 24–14. Drive: 2 plays, 88 yards, 0:20.
- UTAH – Creed Whittemore 11-yard pass from Devon Dampier (Dillon Curtis kick), 2:26. Utes 31–14. Drive: 8 plays, 52 yards, 3:29.
- UTAH – Mana Carvalho 75-yard punt return (Dillon Curtis kick), 1:36. Utes 38–14.

Fourth quarter

- UTAH – Byrd Ficklin 2-yard run (Dillon Curtis kick), 3:25. Utes 45–14. Drive: 4 plays, 26 yards, 2:21.

Statistics	CIN	UTAH
First downs	18	29
Plays–yards	63–427	84–480
Rushes–yards	30–206	53–267
Passing yards	221	213
Passing: comp–att–int	11–33–1	16–31–1
Turnovers	3	2
Time of possession	19:58	40:02

Team	Category	Player	Statistics
Cincinnati	Passing	Brendan Sorsby	11/33, 221 yards, TD, INT
Cincinnati	Rushing	Tawee Walker	7 carries, 67 yards
Cincinnati	Receiving	Cyrus Allen	2 receptions, 133 yards, TD
Utah	Passing	Devon Dampier	16/31, 213 yards, 2 TD, INT
Utah	Rushing	Wayshawn Parker	17 carries, 104 yards, TD
Utah	Receiving	Ryan Davis	8 receptions, 132 yards, TD

=== vs Arizona ===
Arizona Wildcats (6–3) at No. 25 Cincinnati Bearcats (7–2) – Game summary

Quarter	1	2	3	4	Total
Wildcats	7	3	10	10	30
No. 25 Bearcats	14	0	3	7	24

at Nippert Stadium • Cincinnati, Ohio

- Date: November 15
- Game time: 12:00 p.m.
- Game weather: Cloudy, 63 °F (17 °C)
- Game attendance: 37,099
- Referee: David Alvarez
- TV announcers (FS1): Connor Onion (play-by-play) and Mark Helfrich (analyst)

Game information

First quarter

- (14:03) ARIZ – Ismail Mahdi 27-yard run, Michael Salgado-Medina kick (Drive: 2 plays, 26 yards, 0:49; Arizona 7–0)
- (11:07) CIN – Brendan Sorsby 4-yard run, Stephen Rusnak kick (Drive: 6 plays, 75 yards, 2:57; Tied 7–7)
- (6:34) CIN – Jeff Caldwell 7-yard pass from Brendan Sorsby, Stephen Rusnak kick (Drive: 5 plays, 74 yards, 2:42; Cincinnati 14–7)

Second quarter

- (0:04) ARIZ – Michael Salgado-Medina 24-yard field goal (Drive: 11 plays, 58 yards, 4:46; Cincinnati 14–10)

Third quarter

- (9:42) ARIZ – Michael Salgado-Medina 25-yard field goal (Drive: 11 plays, 68 yards, 5:18; Cincinnati 14–13)
- (5:20) ARIZ – Kedrick Reescano 50-yard run, Michael Salgado-Medina kick (Drive: 6 plays, 99 yards, 2:29; Arizona 20–14)
- (0:00) CIN – Stephen Rusnak 28-yard field goal (Drive: 12 plays, 66 yards, 5:21; Arizona 20–17)

Fourth quarter

- (10:53) ARIZ – Gio Richardson 15-yard pass from Noah Fifita, Michael Salgado-Medina kick (Drive: 9 plays, 75 yards, 4:07; Arizona 27–17)
- (6:38) CIN – Zion Johnson 1-yard run, Stephen Rusnak kick (Drive: 12 plays, 75 yards, 4:15; Arizona 27–24)
- (1:34) ARIZ – Michael Salgado-Medina 51-yard field goal (Drive: 11 plays, 42 yards, 5:04; Arizona 30–24)

Statistics	ARIZ	CIN
First downs	24	14
Plays–yards	73–475	57–344
Rushes–yards	42–181	29–190
Passing yards	294	154
Passing: Comp–Att–Int	23–31–0	15–28–2
Turnovers	0	2
Time of possession	36:41	23:19

Team	Category	Player	Statistics
Arizona	Passing	Noah Fifita	23/31, 294 yards, TD
Arizona	Rushing	Kedrick Reescano	13 carries, 94 yards, TD
Arizona	Receiving	Kris Hutson	8 receptions, 123 yards
Cincinnati	Passing	Brendan Sorsby	15/28, 154 yards, TD, 2 INT
Cincinnati	Rushing	Tawee Walker	12 carries, 119 yards
Cincinnati	Receiving	Jeff Caldwell	5 receptions, 68 yards, TD

=== vs No. 11 BYU ===
No. 11 BYU Cougars (9–1) at Cincinnati Bearcats (7–3) – Game summary

Quarter	1	2	3	4	Total
No. 11 Cougars	7	3	7	9	26
Bearcats	0	7	0	7	14

at Nippert Stadium • Cincinnati, Ohio

- Date: November 22
- Game time: 8:00 p.m.
- Game weather: Clear, 43 °F (6 °C), Winds 1mph SE
- Game attendance: 38,034
- Referee: Mike McCabe
- TV announcers (FOX): Jason Benetti (play-by-play), Robert Griffin III (analyst), and Alexa Landestoy (sideline)

Game information

First quarter

- BYU – 4:39 Bear Bachmeier 6-yard run (Will Ferrin kick). BYU 7–0. Drive: 10 plays, 50 yards, 5:13.

Second quarter

- CIN – 6:34 Cyrus Allen 27-yard pass from Brendan Sorsby (Stephen Rusnack kick). TIED 7–7. Drive: 2 plays, 33 yards, 0:52.
- BYU – 1:56 Will Ferrin 31-yard Field Goal. BYU 10-7. Drive: 11 plays, 61 yards, 4:38.

Third quarter

- BYU – 8:26 LJ Martin 1-yard run (Will Ferrin kick). BYU 17–7. Drive: 11 plays, 66 yards, 5:24.

Fourth quarter

- BYU – 14:07 Will Ferrin 32-yard Field Goal. BYU 20-7. Drive: 12 plays, 56 yards, 6:06.
- CIN – 4:37 Jeff Caldwell 19-yard pass from Brendan Sorsby (Stephen Rusnack kick). BYU 20–14. Drive: 8 plays, 86 yards, 3:14.
- BYU – 0:56 LJ Martin 33-yard run (Bear Bachmeier 2-pt pass intercepted). BYU 26–14. Drive: 9 plays, 75 yards, 3:34.

Statistics	BYU	CIN
First downs	24	19
Plays–yards	74–392	61–387
Rushes–yards	49–265	23–87
Passing yards	127	300
Passing: comp–att–int	15–25–0	25–38–1
Turnovers	0	2
Time of possession	38:25	21:35

Team	Category	Player	Statistics
BYU	Passing	Bear Bachmeier	15/25, 127 yards
BYU	Rushing	LJ Martin	32 carries, 222 yards, 2 TD
BYU	Receiving	LJ Martin	3 receptions, 44 yards
Cincinnati	Passing	Brendan Sorsby	25/38, 300 yards, 2 TD, INT
Cincinnati	Rushing	Brendan Sorsby	8 carries, 38 yards
Cincinnati	Receiving	Cyrus Allen	2 receptions, 51 yards, TD

=== at TCU ===
Cincinnati Bearcats (7–4) at TCU Horned Frogs (7–4) – Game summary

Quarter	1	2	3	4	Total
Bearcats	7	10	0	6	23
Horned Frogs	21	10	7	7	45

at Amon G. Carter Stadium • Fort Worth, Texas

- Date: November 29
- Game time: 3:30 p.m.
- Game weather:
- Game attendance: 37,259
- Referee: Michael VanderVelde
- TV announcers (FOX): Jason Benetti (play-by-play), Robert Griffin III (analyst) and Alexa Landestoy (sideline)

Game information

First quarter

- TCU – Joseph Manjack IV 3-yard pass from Josh Hoover (Nate McCashland kick), 9:51. Horned Frogs 7–0. Drive: 8 plays, 34 yards, 3:23.
- TCU – Eric McAlister 17-yard pass from Josh Hoover (Nate McCashland kick), 5:44. Horned Frogs 14–0. Drive: 5 plays, 81 yards, 2:15.
- CIN – Evan Pryor 26-yard pass from Brendan Sorsby (Stephen Rusnak kick), 1:53. Horned Frogs 14–7. Drive: 7 plays, 75 yards, 3:51.
- TCU – Jordan Dwyer 69-yard pass from Josh Hoover (Nate McCashland kick), 0:45. Horned Frogs 21–7. Drive: 3 plays, 75 yards, 1:08.

Second quarter

- CIN – Jeff Caldwell 14-yard pass from Brendan Sorsby (Stephen Rusnak kick), 11:27. Horned Frogs 21–14. Drive: 8 plays, 75 yards, 4:18.
- TCU – Nate McCashland 32-yard field goal, 5:21. Horned Frogs 24–14. Drive: 10 plays, 17 yards, 4:51.
- CIN – Stephen Rusnak 26-yard field goal, 3:13. Horned Frogs 24–17. Drive: 6 plays, 67 yards, 2:08.
- TCU – Jeremy Payne 9-yard run (Nate McCashland kick), 0:23. Horned Frogs 31–17. Drive: 9 plays, 75 yards, 2:50.

Third quarter

- TCU – Joseph Manjack IV 44-yard pass from Josh Hoover, fumbled, Jordan Dwyer fumble recovery in the end zone (Nate McCashland kick), 11:08. Horned Frogs 38–17. Drive: 8 plays, 75 yards, 4:10.

Fourth quarter

- CIN – Cyrus Allen 35-yard pass from Brendan Sorsby (pass failed), 12:47. Horned Frogs 38–23. Drive: 6 plays, 94 yards, 2:05.
- TCU – Jeremy Payne 51-yard run (Nate McCashland kick), 10:28. Horned Frogs 45–23. Drive: 5 plays, 75 yards, 2:19.

Statistics	CIN	TCU
First downs	17	27
Plays–yards	52–397	74–544
Rushes–yards	19–115	52–238
Passing yards	282	306
Passing: comp–att–int	23–33–0	19–22–0
Turnovers	1	0
Time of possession	22:05	37:55

Team	Category	Player	Statistics
Cincinnati	Passing	Brendan Sorsby	23/33, 282 yards, 3 TD
Cincinnati	Rushing	Brendan Sorsby	10 carries, 59 yards
Cincinnati	Receiving	Caleb Goodie	5 receptions, 67 yards
TCU	Passing	Josh Hoover	19/22, 306 yards, 4 TD
TCU	Rushing	Jeremy Payne	26 carries, 174 yards, 2 TD
TCU	Receiving	Eric McAlister	8 receptions, 101 yards, TD

=== vs. Navy (Liberty Bowl) ===
2026 AutoZone Liberty Bowl
Navy Midshipmen (10–2) vs Cincinnati Bearcats (7–5) – Game summary

Quarter	1	2	3	4	Total
Midshipmen	7	7	7	14	35
Bearcats	0	7	0	6	13

at Simmons Bank Liberty Stadium • Memphis, TN

- Date: January 2, 2026
- Game time: 4:30 p.m.
- Game weather: Rain • Temperature: 52 °F (11 °C) • Wind: 8 mph (13 km/h) north
- Game attendance: 21,908
- Referee: David Smith (SEC)
- TV announcers (ESPN): Mike Monaco (play-by-play), Kirk Morrison (analyst) and Dawn Davenport (sideline)

Game information

First quarter

- NAVY – Blake Horvath 2-yard run (Nathan Kirkwood kick), 3:19. Midshipmen 7–0. Drive: 7 plays, 63 yards, 4:22.

Second quarter

- CIN – Samaj Jones 6-yard run (Stephen Rusnak kick), 9:47. Tied 7–7. Drive: 17 plays, 75 yards, 8:32.
- NAVY – Luke Hutchison 30-yard pass from Blake Horvath (Nathan Kirkwood kick), 0:40. Midshipmen 14–7. Drive: 11 plays, 80 yards, 3:10.

Third quarter

- NAVY – Eli Heidenreich 13-yard pass from Blake Horvath (Nathan Kirkwood kick), 10:15. Midshipmen 21–7. Drive: 8 plays, 75 yards, 4:39.

Fourth quarter

- NAVY – Alex Tecza 3-yard run (Nathan Kirkwood kick), 10:00. Midshipmen 28–7. Drive: 14 plays, 56 yards, 7:44.
- CIN – Cyrus Allen 4-yard pass from Brady Lichtenberg (pass failed), 6:52. Midshipmen 28–13. Drive: 8 plays, 75 yards, 3:08.
- NAVY – Coleman Cauley 5-yard interception return (Nathan Kirkwood kick), 2:54. Midshipmen 35–13.

Statistics	NAVY	CIN
First downs	22	12
Plays–yards	66–349	58–239
Rushes–yards	51–241	38–142
Passing yards	108	97
Passing: comp–att–int	9–15–0	12–20–1
Turnovers	1	2
Time of possession	33:42	26:18

Team	Category	Player	Statistics
Navy	Passing	Blake Horvath	9/15, 108 yards, 2 TD
Navy	Rushing	Alex Tecza	16 carries, 80 yards, TD
Navy	Receiving	Eli Heidenreich	5 receptions, 64 yards, TD
Cincinnati	Passing	Brady Lichtenberg	10/15, 78 yards, TD, INT
Cincinnati	Rushing	Manny Covey	11 carries, 78 yards
Cincinnati	Receiving	Manny Covey	5 receptions, 28 yards

== Personnel ==
=== Roster and staff ===
2025 Cincinnati Bearcats football team roster
Players
Coaches
Offense

Pos.	#	Name	Class
QB	2	Brendan Sorsby	Jr
RB	3	Tawee Walker	Sr
WR	4	Cyrus Allen	Sr
QB	5	Samaj Jones	Fr
RB	6	Evan Pryor	Sr
RB	7	Chance Williams	Jr
WR	8	Noah Jennings	Jr
WR	9	Jeff Caldwell	Sr
WR	10	Caleb Goodie	Jr
TE	11	Joe Royer	Sr
QB	12	Zebulin Kinsey	Fr
RB	13	Zion Johnson	Fr
WR	14	Barry Jackson	So
QB	15	Will Kocher	So
QB	16	Brady Lichtenberg	Sr
WR	17	Giyahni Kontosis	Fr
WR	18	Kale Woodburn	Fr
WR	19	Dakari Anderson	Fr
RB	20	Jakorion Coffey	Fr
TE	21	Patrick Gurd	Sr
WR	22	Zane Kinsey	Fr
RB	29	Manny Covey	So
OL	50	Evan Tengesdahl	So
OL	53	Gavin Gerhardt	Sr
OL	56	Deondre Buford	Sr
OL	59	Jake Wheelock	Fr
TE	63	Kellen Davis	Fr
OL	63	Zac Clarke	Fr
OL	66	Xavier Lozowicki	So
OL	69	JP Schrieber	Fr
OT	70	Cray Paich	Fr
OL	71	Judea Milon	Sr
OL	72	Nathan Latulippe	Jr
OL	73	Aiden Pastoriza	Fr
OL	74	Joe Cotton	Jr
OL	75	Marcus McGregor	Fr
OL	77	Taran Tyo	Jr
OL	78	Grant Edgington	So
OL	79	Ethan Green	Jr
WR	80	Elijah Jones	Fr
TE	82	Ka'Maurri Smith	Fr
TE	83	Devyn Zahursky	Fr
TE	85	Lyviel Waters	Fr
TE	87	Gavin Grover	So
WR	88	Nash Biglin	Fr
TE	88	DaMari Witherspoon	Fr

Defense

Pos.	#	Name	Class
DB	0	Matthew McDoom	Sr
DT	2	Dontay Corleone	Sr
S	3	Kye Stokes	Jr
DE	4	Mikah Coleman	Sr
DB	5	Christian Harrison	Jr
S	6	Trevon Gola-Callard	Sr
CB	8	Ormanie Arnold	Jr
STAR	9	Jiquan Sanks	So
DB	10	Tayden Burnes	So
LB	11	Jake Golday	Sr
S	13	Patrick Williams	Fr
CB	14	Zay Johnson	Fr
DE	16	Jaylon White-McClain	Jr
LB	17	Brian Simms III	So
STAR	18	Marqavious Saboor	So
S	19	CJ Jones	Fr
STAR	20	CJ Crite	Fr
DL	21	CJ McCray	Sr
LB	22	Jonathan Thompson	Jr
CB	23	Willie Goodwyn	Fr
LB	24	Terrell Holcomb	Fr
CB	25	Daniel James	Fr
DL	26	Cam Roetherford (injured)	Jr
CB	29	Stanley Clyne	So
LB	31	Simeon Coleman	So
LB	33	Darrel Gipson	So
LB	34	Myles Harrison	Fr
S	35	Drew Robinson	Fr
DB	36	Xavier Williams	Sr
LB	39	Cincear Lewis	Jr
DE	40	Kamari Burns	So
LB	41	Quinn Staten	So
LB	44	Montay Weedon	So
STAR	46	Antwan Peek Jr.	Jr
LB	49	Jack Dingle	Sr
DL	55	Isaiah Rogers	Sr
DL	56	Tim Griffin	Fr
DT	57	Ben Blevins	Sr
DL	82	James Early	Fr
DL	88	CD McFee	Fr
DT	90	Jalen Hunt	Sr
DE	91	Drew Logan	Jr
DL	92	Elijah Gunn	So
DL	93	Harris Adams	Sr
DT	94	Kelian Smith	So
DL	95	Lendric Barber	Fr
DE	96	Nathan Nunn	Fr
DL	97	Kameron Neal	Fr
DL	98	Marquaze Parker	So
DE	99	Rob Jackson	Sr

Special teams

Pos.	#	Name	Class
P	30	Max Fletcher	Jr
LS	47	George Leibold	Fr
LS	48	Weston Simmons	So
K	93	Max LeMasters	So
K	99	Stephen Rusnak	Sr

Head coach

- Scott Satterfield (Appalachian State) – 3rd year

Coordinators/assistant coaches

- Tyson Veidt (Muskingum)
  2nd year – (defensive coordinator/safeties)
- Brad Glenn (Clemson)
  3rd year – (offensive coordinator/wide receivers)
- Cortney Braswell (Liberty)
  3rd year – (co-defensive coordinator / linebackers)
- Adam Braithwhite (William & Mary)
  1st year – (safeties)
- Nic Cardwell (Appalachian State)
  3rd year – (offensive line)
- Sean Dawkins (Troy)
  2nd year – (offensive line)
- Eddie Hicks (Southern Miss)
  1st year – (cornerbacks)
- Josh Stepp (Newberry)
  3rd year – (tight ends)
- Walter Stewart (Cincinnati)
  4th year – (defensive line)
- Pete Thomas (NC State)
  3rd year – (quarterbacks)
- Luke Paschall (Middle Tennessee)
  1st year – (special teams)
- Vijay Stingley (Sam Houston State)
  3rd year – (quarterbacks)

Legend

- (C) Team captain
- (S) Suspended
- (I) Ineligible
- Injured
- Redshirt

Roster

== Rankings ==
Ranking movements Legend: ██ Increase in ranking ██ Decrease in ranking — = Not ranked RV = Received votes
	Week																
Poll	Pre	1	2	3	4	5	6	7	8	9	10	11	12	13	14	15	Final
AP	—	—	—	—	—	—	RV	24	21	17	25	22	—	—	—	—	—
Coaches	—	—	—	—	—	—	RV	24	21	16	25	22	—	—	—	—	—
CFP	Not released										—	25	—	—	—	—	Not released

== Awards and honors ==
Big 12 Weekly Honors
Date	Player	Class	Pos.	Award	Ref.
September 2	Jake Golday	RS-Sr	LB	Big 12 Co-Defensive Player of the Week	
September 8	Offensive Line			Big 12 Offensive Line Team of the Week	
September 15	Brendan Sorsby	RS-Jr	QB	Big 12 Co-Offensive Player of the Week	
September 29	Brendan Sorsby	RS-Jr	QB	Big 12 Co-Offensive Player of the Week	
September 29	Stephen Rusnak	RS-Sr	K	Big 12 Co-Special Teams Player of the Week	
September 29	Offensive Line			Big 12 Offensive Line Team of the Week	
October 6	Jake Golday	RS-Sr	LB	Big 12 Co-Defensive Player of the Week	
October 6	Offensive Line			Big 12 Offensive Line Team of the Week	
October 13	Max Fletcher	RS-Jr	P	Big 12 Co-Special Teams Player of the Week	

=== All-Big 12 ===
All-Big 12
Player	Pos.	1st/2nd/3rd team
Jake Golday	LB	1st
Brendan Sorsby	QB	2nd
Cyrus Allen	WR	2nd
Joe Cotton	OL	2nd
Evan Tengesdahl	OL	2nd
Dontay Corleone	DL	2nd
Max Fletcher	P	2nd
Joe Royer	TE	3rd
Gavin Gerhardt	OL	3rd
Jeff Caldwell	WR	HM
Jalen Hunt	DL	HM
Antwan Peek Jr.	DB	HM
Tawee Walker	RB	HM
HM = Honorable mention
