= 2025 Alamo Bowl =

Postseason college football bowl game

2025 Valero Alamo Bowl
- 33rd Alamo Bowl
USC Trojans	TCU Horned Frogs
(9–3)	(8–4)
Big Ten	Big 12
27	30
Head coach: Lincoln Riley	Head coach: Sonny Dykes
AP / Coaches / CFP; 16 / 16 / 16
	1	2	3	4	OT	Total
USC	3	10	8	3	3	27
TCU	0	14	0	10	6	30
- Date: December 30, 2025
- Season: 2025
- Stadium: Alamodome
- Location: San Antonio, Texas
- MVP: Offense: Ken Seals (QB, TCU); Defense: Kaleb Elarms-Orr (LB, TCU)
- Favorite: USC by 4.5
- Referee: Justin Elliott (ACC)
- Attendance: 54,751

United States TV coverage
- Network: ESPN; ESPN Radio
- Announcers: Bob Wischusen (play-by-play), Louis Riddick (analyst), and Dana Boyle (sideline reporter) (ESPN); Jorge Sedano (play-by-play), Rodney McLeod (analyst), and Victoria Arlen (sideline reporter) (ESPN Radio)

The 2025 Alamo Bowl was a college football bowl game played on December 30, 2025, at the Alamodome located in San Antonio, Texas. The 33rd annual Alamo Bowl game began at approximately 8:00 p.m. CST and aired on ESPN. The Alamo Bowl was one of the 2025–26 bowl games concluding the 2025 FBS football season. The game was sponsored by Valero Energy, a company that produces petroleum-based fuels, and known as the Valero Alamo Bowl.

The TCU Horned Frogs from the Big 12 Conference defeated the USC Trojans from the Big Ten Conference in overtime, 30–27.

== Teams ==
Consistent with conference tie-ins, the game featured a team from the Big 12 Conference, TCU, and a legacy member of the Pac-12 Conference, USC, who competed in the Pac-12 through 2023 before departing for the Big Ten Conference.

=== TCU Horned Frogs ===
TCU opened their season with three consecutive wins and were briefly ranked before losing to Arizona State. The Horned Frogs won three of their next four games and had a record of 6–2 at the end of October. TCU lost two of their four games during November and entered the Alamo Bowl with an 8–4 record.

=== USC Trojans ===
USC compiled a 9–3 record during the regular season and was ranked as high as 15th. Each of their losses came to other ranked teams: Illinois, Notre Dame, and Oregon. The Trojans entered the Alamo Bowl ranked 16th in each of the major polls.

== Game summary ==
2025 Valero Alamo Bowl

Quarter	1	2	3	4	OT	Total
No. 16 USC	3	10	8	3	3	27
TCU	0	14	0	10	6	30

at Alamodome • San Antonio, Texas

- Date: December 30, 2025
- Game time: 8:00 p.m. CST
- Game weather: n/a (indoor)
- Game attendance: 54,751
- Referee: Justin Elliott
- TV announcers (ESPN): Bob Wischusen (play-by-play), Louis Riddick (analyst), and Dana Boyle (sideline)
- Box score

Game information

First quarter

- (7:06) USC – Ryon Sayeri 40-yard field goal (7 plays, 50 yards, 3:46; USC 3–0)

Second quarter

- (13:36) TCU – Jon Denman 5-yard run (Kyle Lemmermann kick) (9 plays, 69 yards, 3:55; TCU 7–3)
- (9:57) USC – King Miller 2-yard run (Ryon Sayeri kick) (7 plays, 75 yards, 3:39; USC 10–7)
- (4:58) TCU – Ken Seals 1-yard run (Kyle Lemmermann kick) (13 plays, 75 yards, 4:59; TCU 14–10)
- (0:18) USC – Ryon Sayeri 28-yard field goal (10 plays, 64 yards, 4:40; TCU 14–13)

Third quarter

- (0:49) USC – Jaden Richardson 21-yard pass from Jayden Maiava (Jayden Maiava pass to Taniela Tupou for two-point conversion) (5 plays, 73 yards, 3:02; USC 21–14)

Fourth quarter

- (9:37) USC – Ryon Sayeri 41-yard field goal (8 plays, 46 yards, 5:05; USC 24–14)
- (4:24) TCU – Jeremy Payne 5-yard run (Kyle Lemmermann kick) (11 plays, 75 yards, 5:13; USC 24–21)
- (0:02) TCU – Kyle Lemmermann 27-yard field goal (13 plays, 59 yards, 2:44; Tied 24–24)

Overtime

- (OT) USC – Ryon Sayeri 22-yard field goal (6 plays, 20 yards; USC 27–24)
- (OT) TCU – Jeremy Payne 35-yard pass from Ken Seals (3 plays, 35 yards; TCU 30–27)

=== Statistics ===
Statistics	USC	TCU
First downs	19	20
Plays–yards	63–392	71–375
Rushes–yards	33–112	31–117
Passing yards	280	258
Passing: comp–att–int	18–30–2	29–40–1
Time of possession	31:52	28:08

Team	Category	Player	Statistics
USC	Passing	Jayden Maiava	18/30, 280 yards, TD, 2 INT
USC	Rushing	King Miller	25 carries, 99 yards, TD
USC	Receiving	Tanook Hines	6 receptions, 163 yards
TCU	Passing	Ken Seals	29/40, 258 yards, TD, INT
TCU	Rushing	Jeremy Payne	13 carries, 73 yards, TD
TCU	Receiving	Eric McAlister	8 receptions, 69 yards
