= Ken Seals =

American football player

No. 19
- Position: Quarterback

Personal information
- Listed height: 6 ft 2 in (1.88 m)
- Listed weight: 221 lb (100 kg)

Career information
- High school: Weatherford (Weatherford, Texas)
- College: Vanderbilt (2020–2023); TCU (2024–2025)
- NFL draft: 2026: undrafted
- Stats at ESPN

Kenneth Austin Seals is an American football quarterback. He played college football for the Vanderbilt Commodores and the TCU Horned Frogs.

== Early life ==
Seals grew up in Azle, Texas and attended Azle High School before transferring to Weatherford High School during his sophomore year making him ineligible for that season. In his high school career, Seals completed a school-record of 5,714 passing yards and 53 passing touchdowns. He also completed 187 carries with 712 yards and 12 rushing touchdowns. He was rated a three-star recruit and committed to play college football at Vanderbilt University over offers from Boston College, Cincinnati, Florida Atlantic, Kansas, Minnesota, Montana State, NC State, Nevada, Princeton, Rutgers and UTEP.

== College career ==
=== Vanderbilt ===
During Seals's true freshman season in 2020, he played in and started nine games while being the team's starting quarterback making him the third SEC true freshman quarterback to start a season opener since 1972. He finished the season with completing 186 out of 288 passing attempts for 1,928 yards along with 12 touchdowns against 10 interceptions.

During the 2021 season, he played in eight games and started seven of them. He finished the season with completing 127 out of 225 passing attempts for 1,181 yards with five touchdown passes against eight interceptions.

Seals did not see game action during the 2022 season.

During the 2023 season, he played in nine games and started six of them. He was named the starting quarterback against Missouri to replace AJ Swann who suffered an injury. He finished the season with completing 98 out of 170 passing attempts for 1,122 yards and 10 touchdowns against four interceptions. Seals entered the NCAA transfer portal on November 29, 2023.

=== TCU ===
On January 4, 2024, Seals announced that he would be transferring to TCU.

=== Statistics ===
Season	Team	Games			Passing								Rushing			
Season	Team	GP	GS	Record	Cmp	Att	Pct	Yds	Y/A	TD	Int	Rtg	Att	Yds	Avg	TD
2020	Vanderbilt	9	9	0–9	186	288	64.6	1,928	6.7	12	10	127.6	41	-52	-1.3	0
2021	Vanderbilt	8	7	2–5	127	224	56.7	1,181	5.3	5	8	101.2	38	-28	-0.7	1
2022	Vanderbilt	0	0	—	DNP											
2023	Vanderbilt	10	6	0–6	105	179	58.7	1,183	6.6	11	4	130.0	40	30	0.8	2
2024	TCU	6	0	—	10	13	76.9	97	7.5	1	0	165.0	4	12	3.0	0
2025	TCU	4	1	1–0	33	46	71.7	282	6.1	1	2	121.7	9	-2	-0.2	1
Career		37	23	3–20	461	750	61.5	4,671	6.2	30	24	120.6	132	-40	-0.3	4

== Professional career ==
Pre-draft measurables
Height	Weight	Arm length	Hand span	Wingspan	40-yard dash	10-yard split	20-yard split	20-yard shuttle	Three-cone drill	Vertical jump	Broad jump
6 ft 2 in (1.88 m)	221 lb (100 kg)	31 7/8 in (0.81 m)	9 1/4 in (0.23 m)	6 ft 5 3/4 in (1.97 m)	4.95 s	1.69 s	2.83 s	4.51 s	7.25 s	28.5 in (0.72 m)	9 ft 4 in (2.84 m)
All values from Pro Day

In April 2026, Seals was invited to attend rookie minicamp with the Kansas City Chiefs.
