= Elijah Jackson =

American football player (born 2001)

No. 25 – TCU Horned Frogs
- Position: Cornerback
- Class: Senior

Personal information
- Born: December 27, 2001 (age 24)
- Listed height: 6 ft 1 in (1.85 m)
- Listed weight: 193 lb (88 kg)

Career information
- High school: Lawndale (Lawndale, California)
- College: Washington (2020–2024); TCU (2025–present)
- Stats at ESPN

Elijah Jackson (born December 27, 2001) is an American college football cornerback for the TCU Horned Frogs. He previously played for the Washington Huskies.

== Early life ==
Jackson attended Lawndale High School in Lawndale, California. He was rated as a three-star recruit and committed to play college football for the Washington Huskies.

== College career ==
=== Washington ===
As a freshman in 2021, Jackson notched just one tackle. During the 2022 season, he played in seven games with two starts, tallying ten tackles and a forced fumble. On the final play of the 2024 Sugar Bowl quarterback Quinn Ewers attempted to throw to Adonai Mitchell in the end zone for a game-winning touchdown, where Jackson deflected the pass, sending the Huskies to the National Championship. Jackson finished his breakout 2023 season notching 61 tackles with two being for a loss, six pass deflections, two forced fumbles, and a blocked field goal.

On December 18, 2024, Jackson announced that he would enter the NCAA transfer portal.

=== TCU ===
On December 29, 2024, Jackson announced that he would transfer to TCU.

== Personal life ==
Jackson is the cousin of former NBA first round picks Tony Smith and Malik Monk, and seventh round NFL pick Marcus Monk.
