= Jeremy Payne =

American football player

No. 26 – TCU Horned Frogs
- Position: Running back
- Class: Junior

Personal information
- Listed height: 5 ft 10 in (1.78 m)
- Listed weight: 180 lb (82 kg)

Career information
- High school: Hightower (Missouri City, Texas)
- College: TCU (2024–present)
- Stats at ESPN

Jeremy Payne is an American football running back for the TCU Horned Frogs.

== Early life ==
Payne attended Hightower High School in Missouri City, Texas. During his high school career, he finished as the school's all-time leader in rushing yards with 4,121 yards, touchdowns with 41, and yards per carry averaging 9.2 yards. Payne also finished as second all-time in receiving yards with 1,432 yards and third all-time in receiving touchdowns with 15. He was rated as a four-star recruit, the 16th overall running back, and the 41st overall player in the state of Texas by 247Sports, and committed to play college football for the TCU Horned Frogs over offers from other schools such as Baylor, Texas A&M, Oklahoma, Auburn, Oregon, Michigan State, Utah, and Houston.

== College career ==
As a freshman in 2024, Payne rushed for 239 yards and three touchdowns on 54 carries. In week 13 of the 2025 season, he recorded 103 yards in a win over Houston. In the regular season finale, Payne ran for 174 yards and two touchdowns in a victory versus Cincinnati. In the 2025 Alamo Bowl, he rushed for 73 yards and a touchdown on 13 carries, while also hauling in six passes for 50 yards and the game-winning touchdown, in a comeback victory in overtime versus USC. Payne finished the 2025 season with 623 rushing yards and five touchdowns on 110 carries, while also bringing in 22 receptions for 207 yards and two touchdowns.
