= Jordan Dwyer =

American football player

No. 7 – TCU Horned Frogs
- Position: Wide receiver
- Class: Redshirt Senior

Personal information
- Listed height: 6 ft 0 in (1.83 m)
- Listed weight: 190 lb (86 kg)

Career information
- High school: Puyallup (Puyallup, Washington)
- College: Idaho (2022–2024); TCU (2025–present)

Awards and highlights
- Second-team All-Big Sky (2024)
- Stats at ESPN

Jordan Dwyer is an American college football wide receiver for the TCU Horned Frogs. He previously played for the Idaho Vandals.

== Early life ==
Dwyer attended Puyallup High School in Puyallup, Washington. He committed to the University of Idaho to play college football.

== College career ==
Dwyer redshirted his first year at Idaho in 2022, after playing in four games and recording 12 receptions for 136 yards and two touchdowns. As a redshirt freshman he played in 13 games and had 20 receptions for 328 yards and four touchdowns. As a redshirt sophomore in 2024, he played in 14 games and 78 receptions for 1,192 yards and 12 touchdowns. After the season, Dwyer transferred to Texas Christian University (TCU). In his first game at TCU in 2025, he had nine receptions for 136 yards and a touchdown.
