= 2025 Kansas Jayhawks football team =

American college football season

2025 Kansas Jayhawks football
- Conference: Big 12 Conference
- Record: 5–7 (3–6 Big 12)
- Head coach: Lance Leipold (5th season)
- Offensive coordinator: Jim Zebrowski (1st season)
- Co-offensive coordinator: Matt Lubick (1st season)
- Offensive scheme: Pro spread
- Defensive coordinator: D. K. McDonald (1st season)
- Base defense: 4–2–5
- Home stadium: David Booth Kansas Memorial Stadium

2025 Big 12 Conference football standings
	Conf.			Overall
Team	W		L	W		L
No. 7 Texas Tech y$^	8	–	1	12	–	2
No. 11 BYU y	8	–	1	12	–	2
No. 14 Utah	7	–	2	11	–	2
No. 22 Houston	6	–	3	10	–	3
Arizona	6	–	3	9	–	4
Arizona State	6	–	3	8	–	5
No. 25 TCU	5	–	4	9	–	4
Iowa State	5	–	4	8	–	4
Cincinnati	5	–	4	7	–	6
Kansas State	5	–	4	6	–	6
Baylor	3	–	6	5	–	7
Kansas	3	–	6	5	–	7
UCF	2	–	7	5	–	7
West Virginia	2	–	7	4	–	8
Colorado	1	–	8	3	–	9
Oklahoma State	0	–	9	1	–	11
Championship: Texas Tech 34, BYU 7
^ – College Football Playoff participant; $ – Conference champion; y – Championship game participant; Rankings from AP Poll

The 2025 Kansas Jayhawks football team represented the University of Kansas during the 2025 NCAA Division I FBS football season. It was the Jayhawks' 136th season. The Jayhawks played their home games at David Booth Kansas Memorial Stadium located in Lawrence, Kansas. They were led by fifth-year head coach Lance Leipold.

The Kansas Jayhawks drew an average home attendance of 39,478.

== Offseason ==
=== Coaching staff changes ===
Name	Position	Reason	Replacement
Jeff Grimes	Co-Offensive coordinator	Accepted job at Wisconsin	Matt Lubick
Brian Borland	Defensive coordinator	Retired	D. K. McDonald

=== Starters lost ===
Starters are based on starters from the final game of the 2024 season. Players listed below have run out of eligibility. In total, the Jayhawks had 15 players run out of eligibility.

Name	Position
Devin Neal	RB
Lawrence Arnold	WR
Luke Grimm	WR
Quentin Skinner	WR
Jared Casey	TE
Bryce Cabeldue	OL
Michael Ford Jr.	OL
J.B. Brown	LB
Cornell Wheeler	LB
Caleb Taylor	DL
Jereme Robinson	DE
Cobee Bryant	CB
Mello Dotson	CB
OJ Burroughs	S
Marvin Grant	S

=== Entered NFL draft ===
Below are players who had remaining eligibility but instead of returning or transferring, chose to enter the 2025 NFL draft.

Name	Position
Dre Doiron	OL

=== Transfer portal ===
Incoming

Name	Position	Old school
Alex Bray	DE	Illinois
Keyan Burnett	TE	Arizona
Bryson Canty	WR	Columbia
Enrique Cruz	OT	Syracuse
Jaidyn Doss	WR	Nebraska
Justice Finkley	EDGE	Texas
Syeed Gibbs	CB	Georgia Tech
DJ Graham	CB	Utah State
Boden Groen	TE	Rice
DeAndre Harper	OT	Northwest Missouri State
Leroy Harris	EDGE	Chattanooga
Emmanuel Henderson	WR	Alabama
Jahlil Hurley	S	Alabama
Bangally Kamara	LB	South Carolina
Gage Keys	DL	Auburn
Trey Lathan	LB	West Virginia
Finn Lappin	P	McNeese
Laith Marjan	K	South Alabama
Tyler Mercer	IOL	North Texas
Cameron Pickett	WR	Ball State
Lyrik Rawls	S	Oklahoma State
Caleb Redd	EDGE	Kentucky
Laquan Robinson	LB	Auburn
Joseph Sipp	LB	Bowling Green
Jack Tanner	OT	Tulsa
Tavake Tuikolovatu	IOL	UCLA
Levi Wentz	WR	Albany
Leshon Williams	RB	Iowa

Outgoing

Name	Position	New school
Lance Bassett	DT	North Alabama
Jaydon Brittingham	DE	Bemidji State
Keyan Burnett	TE	Arizona
Brian Dilworth	DB	North Alabama
Wesley Edison	LB	Coffeyville CC
Myles Ewell	OT	Missouri State
Will Gavin	CB	Indiana State
Damon Greaves	P	Colorado
Bai Jobe	EDGE	Miami (OH)
Griffin Koch	WR	UConn
Hunter Luke	WR	UT Rio Grande Valley
Damarius McGhee	CB	Florida Atlantic
Carson Morgan	RB	Rice
Sevion Morrison	RB	Tulsa
Grant Muffenbier	WR	Unknown
Kaleb Purdy	S	Tennessee Tech
Jarred Sample	WR	Kilgore College
Tyler Soukhot	CB	South Dakota
Harrison Utley	IOL	Unknown
DJ Warner	EDGE	SMU
Charlie Weinrich	K	Houston Christian

== Schedule ==
Date	Time	Opponent	Site	TV	Result	Attendance
August 23	5:30 p.m.	Fresno State*	David Booth Kansas Memorial Stadium; Lawrence, KS	FOX	W 31–7	41,525
August 29	6:30 p.m.	Wagner*	David Booth Kansas Memorial Stadium; Lawrence, KS	ESPN+	W 46–7	39,129
September 6	2:30 p.m.	at Missouri*	Faurot Field; Columbia, MO (Border War)	ESPN2	L 31–42	57,321
September 20	5:00 p.m.	West Virginia	David Booth Kansas Memorial Stadium; Lawrence, KS	FS1	W 41–10	40,320
September 27	11:00 a.m.	Cincinnati	David Booth Kansas Memorial Stadium; Lawrence, KS	TNT	L 34–37	41,525
October 4	6:30 p.m.	at UCF	Acrisure Bounce House; Orlando, FL	ESPN2	W 27–20	43,229
October 11	6:30 p.m.	at No. 9 Texas Tech	Jones AT&T Stadium; Lubbock, TX	FOX	L 17–42	60,229
October 25	11:00 a.m.	Kansas State	David Booth Kansas Memorial Stadium; Lawrence, KS (Sunflower Showdown)	TNT/TruTV	L 17–42	41,525
November 1	3:00 p.m.	Oklahoma State	David Booth Kansas Memorial Stadium; Lawrence, KS	ESPN+	W 38–21	39,511
November 8	2:30 p.m.	at Arizona	Arizona Stadium; Tucson, AZ	ESPN2	L 20–24	41,115
November 22	11:00 a.m.	at Iowa State	Jack Trice Stadium; Ames, IA	FS1	L 14–38	58,275
November 28	11:00 a.m.	No. 13 Utah	David Booth Kansas Memorial Stadium; Lawrence, KS	ESPN	L 21–31	32,811
*Non-conference game; Rankings from AP Poll (and CFP Rankings, after November 4) - Released prior to game; All times are in Central time

== Game summaries ==
=== vs Fresno State ===
Fresno State Bulldogs (0–0) at Kansas Jayhawks (0–0) – Game summary

Quarter	1	2	3	4	Total
Bulldogs	7	0	0	0	7
Jayhawks	14	10	7	0	31

at David Booth Kansas Memorial Stadium • Lawrence, Kansas

- Date: August 23
- Game time: 5:30 p.m.
- Game weather: Clear • Temperature: 82.9 °F (28.3 °C) • Wind: N 10 mph
- Game attendance: 41,525
- Referee: Nolan Dumas
- TV announcers (FOX): Tim Brando (play-by-play), Devin Gardner (analyst), and Josh Sims (sideline)

Game information

First quarter

- (11:06) KU – Cam Pickett 21-yard pass from Jalon Daniels, Laith Marjan kick (Drive: 9 plays, 86 yards, 3:49; Kansas 7–0)
- (7:25) FRES – Elijah Gilliam 3-yard run, Dylan Lynch kick (Drive: 7 plays, 75 yards, 3:46; Tied 7–7)
- (2:16) KU – Leshon Williams 19-yard run, Laith Marjan kick (Drive: 11 plays, 75 yards, 5:10; Kansas 14–7)

Second quarter

- (11:06) KU – Cam Pickett 13-yard pass from Jalon Daniels, Laith Marjan kick (Drive: 5 plays, 59 yards, 1:53; Kansas 21–7)
- (1:00) KU – Laith Marjan 47-yard field goal (Drive: 8 plays, 38 yards, 3:40; Kansas 24–7)

Third quarter

- (7:51) KU – Keaton Kubecka 12-yard pass from Jalon Daniels, Laith Marjan kick (Drive: 5 plays, 49 yards, 2:11; Kansas 31–7)

Fourth quarter

- No scoring plays.

Statistics	FRES	KU
First downs	13	22
Plays–yards	58–216	58–383
Rushes–yards	29–37	38–207
Passing yards	179	176
Passing: comp–att–int	18-29-2	18-20-0
Turnovers	3	0
Time of possession	26:52	33:08

Team	Category	Player	Statistics
Fresno State	Passing	E. J. Warner	18/29, 179 yards, 2 INT
Fresno State	Rushing	Bryson Donelson	11 carries, 34 yards
Fresno State	Receiving	Josiah Freeman	3 receptions, 43 yards
Kansas	Passing	Jalon Daniels	18/20, 176 yards, 3 TD
Kansas	Rushing	Daniel Hishaw Jr.	13 carries, 69 yards
Kansas	Receiving	Cam Pickett	6 receptions, 77 yards, 2 TD

=== vs Wagner (FCS) ===
Wagner Seahawks (FCS) (0–0) at Kansas Jayhawks (1–0) – Game summary

Quarter	1	2	3	4	Total
Seahawks (FCS)	0	7	0	0	7
Jayhawks	14	15	10	7	46

at David Booth Kansas Memorial Stadium • Lawrence, Kansas

- Date: August 29
- Game time: 6:30 p.m.
- Game weather: Sunny, 79°F (26°C), wind SE 6mph
- Game attendance: 39,129
- Referee: Luke Richmond
- TV announcers (ESPN+): Mark Neely (play-by-play) and Todd Doxson (analyst)

Game information

First quarter

- (11:14) KU - DeShawn Hanika 4-yard pass from Jalon Daniels (Laith Marjan kick) (Drive: 6 plays, 50 yards, 1:45; Kansas 7-0)
- (3:12) KU - Emmanuel Henderson 9-yard pass from Jalon Daniels (Laith Marjan kick) (Drive: 8 plays, 63 yards, 3:32; Kansas 14-0)

Second quarter

- (13:06) KU - Cam Pickett 20-yard pass from Jalon Daniels (Carson Bruhn 2-pt run) (Drive: 8 plays, 78 yards, 2:43; Kansas 22-0)
- (5:19) KU - Daniel Hishaw Jr. 20-yard run (Laith Marjan kick) (Drive: 5 plays, 68 yards, 2:07; Kansas 29-0)
- (1:52) WAG - Jeremiah Colclough 45-yard pass from Jack Stevens (Nicholas Romero kick) (Drive: 8 plays, 75 yards, 3:27; Kansas 29-7)

Third quarter

- (14:11) KU - Emmanuel Henderson 62-yard pass from Jalon Daniels (Laith Marjan kick) (Drive: 2 plays, 75 yards, 0:49; Kansas 36-7)
- (6:50) KU - Laith Marjan 27-yard field goal (Drive: 10 plays, 60 yards, 4:53; Kansas 39-7)

Fourth quarter

- (3:40) KU - Harry Stewart III 1-yard run (Dane Efird kick) (Drive: 9 plays, 50 yards, 5:56; Kansas 46-7)

Statistics	WAG	KU
First downs	6	32
Plays–yards	48-143	78-631
Rushes–yards	28-53	44-285
Passing yards	90	346
Passing: comp–att–int	13-20-0	23-34-1
Turnovers	0	2
Time of possession	26:45	33:15

Team	Category	Player	Statistics
Wagner	Passing	Jack Stevens	13/20, 90 yards, TD
Wagner	Rushing	Andre Hines Jr.	8 carries, 25 yards
Wagner	Receiving	Jeremiah Colclough	1 reception, 45 yards, TD
Kansas	Passing	Jalon Daniels	18/25, 280 yards, 4 TD, INT
Kansas	Rushing	Daniel Hishaw Jr.	14 carries, 89 yards, TD
Kansas	Receiving	Emmanuel Henderson	6 receptions, 130 yards, 2 TD

=== at Missouri (Border War) ===
Kansas Jayhawks (2–0) at Missouri Tigers (1–0) – Game summary

Quarter	1	2	3	4	Total
Jayhawks	21	0	3	7	31
Tigers	6	15	7	14	42

at Faurot Field • Columbia, Missouri

- Date: September 6
- Game time: 2:30 p.m.
- Game weather: Sunny, 74 degrees, 10 mph WNW
- Game attendance: 57,321
- Referee: Mike McCabe
- TV announcers (ESPN2): Mike Monaco (play-by-play), Kirk Morrison (analyst), and Dawn Davenport (sideline)

Game information

First quarter

- (10:53) MIZ: Ahmad Hardy 32-yard run (Robert Meyer kick blocked). (Drive: 5 plays, 71 yards, 2:09; Missouri 6–0)
- (8:09) KU: DeShawn Hanika 15-yard pass from Jalon Daniels (Laith Marjan kick). (Drive: 7 plays, 62 yards, 2:41; Kansas 7–6)
- (6:53) KU: Austin Alexander 28-yard fumble return (Laith Marjan kick). Kansas 14-6
- (2:13) KU: Jalon Daniels 1-yard run (Laith Marjan kick). (Drive: 6 plays, 53 yards, 2:33; Kansas 21–6)

Second quarter

- (10:10) MIZ: Kevin Coleman Jr. 3-yard pass from Beau Pribula (Robert Meyer kick). (Drive: 15 plays, 75 yards, 7:03; Kansas 21–13)
- (9:49) MIZ: Team Safety. Kansas 21-15
- (1:03) MIZ: Robert Meyer 25-yard field goal. (Drive: 17 plays, 63 yards, 8:40; Kansas 21–18)
- (0:00) MIZ: Robert Meyer 20-yard field goal. (Drive: 4 plays, 84 yards, 0:28; Tied 21-21)

Third quarter

- (5:48) KU: Laith Marjan 28-yard field goal. (Drive: 11 plays, 53 yards, 4:29; Kansas 24–21)
- (0:24) MIZ: Brett Norfleet 11-yard pass from Beau Pribula (Robert Meyer kick). (Drive: 12 plays, 75 yards, 5:24; Missouri 28–24)

Fourth quarter

- (8:45) KU: DeShawn Hanika 6-yard pass from Jalon Daniels (Laith Marjan kick). (Drive: 8 plays, 92 yards, 3:51; Kansas 31–28)
- (4:14) MIZ: Brett Norfleet 27-yard pass from Beau Pribula (Robert Meyer kick). (Drive: 10 plays, 75 yards, 4:31; Missouri 35–31)
- (1:49) MIZ: Jamal Roberts 63-yard run (Robert Meyer kick). (Drive: 3 plays, 75 yards, 0:56; Missouri 42–31)

Statistics	KU	MIZ
First downs	13	28
Plays–yards	49–226	86–595
Rushes–yards	19–3	47–261
Passing yards	223	334
Passing: comp–att–int	18–30–1	30–39–0
Turnovers	1	1
Time of possession	19:33	40:27

Team	Category	Player	Statistics
Kansas	Passing	Jalon Daniels	18/30, 223 yards, 2 TD, INT
Kansas	Rushing	Jalon Daniels	10 carries, 17 yards, TD
Kansas	Receiving	Deshawn Hanika	6 receptions, 74 yards, 2 TD
Missouri	Passing	Beau Pribula	30/39, 334 yards, 3 TD
Missouri	Rushing	Jamal Roberts	13 carries, 143 yards, TD
Missouri	Receiving	Kevin Coleman Jr.	10 receptions, 126 yards, TD

=== vs West Virginia ===
West Virginia Mountaineers (2–1) at Kansas Jayhawks (2–1) – Game summary

Quarter	1	2	3	4	Total
Mountaineers	0	3	0	7	10
Jayhawks	7	13	14	7	41

at David Booth Kansas Memorial Stadium • Lawrence, Kansas

- Date: September 20
- Game time: 5:00 p.m.
- Game weather: Sunny • Temperature: 82 °F (28 °C) • Wind: SW 8 mph
- Game attendance: 40,320
- Referee: Kevin Mar
- TV announcers (FS1): Noah Reed (play-by-play) and Robert Smith (analyst)

Game information

First quarter

- (11:57) KU: Levi Wentz 41-yard pass from Jalon Daniels (Laith Marjan kick). (Drive: 4 plays, 50 yards, 1:27; Kansas 7–0)

Second quarter

- (10:25) KU: Laith Marjan 42-yard field goal. (Drive: 10 plays, 38 yards, 4:35; Kansas 10–0)
- (3:43) WVU: Kade Hensley 26-yard field goal. (Drive: 9 plays, 49 yards, 3:20; Kansas 10–3)
- (2:11) KU: Leshon Williams 39-yard pass from Jalon Daniels (Laith Marjan kick). (Drive: 3 plays, 56 yards, 1:24; Kansas 17–3)
- (0:00) KU: Laith Marjan 44-yard field goal. (Drive: 7 plays, 38 yards, 0:40; Kansas 20–3)

Third quarter

- (14:48) KU: Emmanuel Henderson 94-yard kickoff return (Laith Marjan kick). (0:12; Kansas 27–3)
- (6:43) KU: Boden Green 7-yard pass from Jalon Daniels (Laith Marjan kick). (Drive: 12 plays, 69 yards, 7:00; Kansas 34–3)

Fourth quarter

- (14:31) WVU: Jaylen Henderson 13-yard run (Kade Hensley kick). (Drive: 11 plays, 95 yards, 4:08; Kansas 34–10)
- (12:52) KU: Leshon Williams 62-yard run (Laith Marjan kick). (Drive: 4 plays, 75 yards, 1:39; Kansas 41–10)

Statistics	WVU	KU
First downs	18	19
Plays–yards	72-323	67-388
Rushes–yards	41-181	41-242
Passing yards	142	146
Passing: comp–att–int	17-31-1	13-26-0
Turnovers	2	0
Time of possession	26:10	33:50

Team	Category	Player	Statistics
West Virginia	Passing	Nicco Marchiol	15/27, 126 yards, INT
West Virginia	Rushing	Jaylen Henderson	7 carries, 79 yards, TD
West Virginia	Receiving	Cyncir Bowers	2 receptions, 26 yards
Kansas	Passing	Jalon Daniels	12/24, 138 yards, 3 TD
Kansas	Rushing	Leshon Williams	19 carries, 129 yards, TD
Kansas	Receiving	Levi Wentz	1 reception, 41 yards, TD

=== vs Cincinnati ===
Cincinnati Bearcats (2–1) at Kansas Jayhawks (3–1) – Game summary

Quarter	1	2	3	4	Total
Bearcats	7	13	10	7	37
Jayhawks	7	6	14	7	34

at David Booth Kansas Memorial Stadium • Lawrence, Kansas

- Date: September 27
- Game time: 11:00 a.m.
- Game weather: Sunny • Temperature: 77 °F (25 °C) • Wind: SW 7 mph
- Game attendance: 41,525
- Referee: Tutashinda Salaam
- TV announcers (TNT/TruTV): J.B. Long (play-by-play), Mike Golic Jr. (analyst), and Lauren Jbara (sideline)

Game information

First quarter

- KU – Emmanuel Henderson 93-yard pass from Jalon Daniels (Laith Marjan kick), 11:42. Jayhawks 7–0. Drive: 1 play, 93 yards, 0:11.
- CIN – Tawee Walker 2-yard run (Stephen Rusnak kick), 6:10. Tied 7–7. Drive: 13 plays, 75 yards, 5:32.

Second quarter

- CIN – Stephen Rusnak 29-yard field goal, 14:23. Bearcats 10–7. Drive: 11 plays, 61 yards, 5:25.
- KU – Laith Marjan 27-yard field goal, 10:00. Tied 10–10. Drive: 9 plays, 67 yards, 4:23.
- CIN – Cyrus Allen 10-yard pass from Brendan Sorsby (Stephen Rusnak kick), 7:09. Bearcats 17–10. Drive: 7 plays, 75 yards, 2:51.
- KU – Laith Marjan 35-yard field goal, 3:15. Bearcats 17–13. Drive: 8 plays, 58 yards, 3:54.
- CIN – Stephen Rusnak 43-yard field goal, 0:00. Bearcats 20–13. Drive: 7 plays, 69 yards, 0:47.

Third quarter

- KU – Boden Groen 24-yard pass from Jalon Daniels (Laith Marjan kick), 11:38. Tied 20–20. Drive: 8 plays, 75 yards, 3:22.
- CIN – Cyrus Allen 14-yard pass from Brendan Sorsby (Stephen Rusnak kick), 8:54. Bearcats 27–20. Drive: 5 plays, 82 yards, 2:38.
- KU – Emmanuel Henderson 75-yard pass from Jalon Daniels (Laith Marjan kick), 8:44. Tied 27–27. Drive: 1 play, 75 yards, 0:10.
- CIN – Stephen Rusnak 24-yard field goal, 1:24. Bearcats 30–27. Drive: 14 plays, 69 yards, 7:20.

Fourth quarter

- KU – Levi Wentz 6-yard pass from Jalon Daniels (Laith Marjan kick), 1:45. Jayhawks 34–30. Drive: 12 plays, 85 yards, 6:17.
- CIN – Tawee Walker 2-yard run (Stephen Rusnak kick), 0:29. Bearcats 37–34. Drive: 10 plays, 75 yards, 1:16.

Statistics	CIN	KU
First downs	29	26
Plays–yards	81–603	55–597
Rushes–yards	37–215	27–152
Passing yards	388	455
Passing: comp–att–int	29–44–0	19–28–0
Turnovers	0	1
Time of possession	34:36	25:24

Team	Category	Player	Statistics
Cincinnati	Passing	Brendan Sorsby	29/43, 388 yards, 2 TD
Cincinnati	Rushing	Evan Pryor	6 carries, 90 yards
Cincinnati	Receiving	Cyrus Allen	11 receptions, 128 yards, 2 TD
Kansas	Passing	Jalon Daniels	19/28, 445 yards, 4 TD
Kansas	Rushing	Leshon Williams	10 carries, 64 yards
Kansas	Receiving	Emmanuel Henderson	5 receptions, 214 yards, 2 TD

=== at UCF ===
Kansas Jayhawks (3–2) at UCF Knights (3–1) – Game summary

Quarter	1	2	3	4	Total
Jayhawks	0	14	13	0	27
Knights	7	13	0	0	20

at Acrisure Bounce House • Orlando, Florida

- Date: October 4
- Game time: 6:30 p.m.
- Game weather: Rain, 75 °F (24 °C)
- Game attendance: 43,229
- Referee: Stephen Baron
- TV announcers (ESPN2): Lowell Galindo (play-by-play), Aaron Murray (analyst), and Lauren Sisler (sideline)

Game information

First quarter

- UCF – Myles Montgomery 29-yard run (Noe Ruelas kick), 8:15, Knights 7–0. Drive: 10 plays, 79 yards, 4:33.

Second quarter

- UCF – Myles Montgomery 3-yard run (Noe Ruelas kick), 14:55, Knights 14–0. Drive: 8 plays, 60 yards, 4:00.
- KU – Leshon Williams 1-yard run (Laith Marjan kick), 10:38, Knights 14–7. Drive: 9 plays, 75 yards, 4:17.
- UCF – Noe Ruelas 38-yard field goal, 7:49, Knights 17–7. Drive: 7 plays, 55 yards, 2:49.
- KU – Leshon Williams 4-yard run (Laith Marjan kick), 1:55, Knights 17–14. Drive: 11 plays, 75 yards, 5:49.
- UCF – Noe Ruelas 38-yard field goal, 0:05, Knights 20–14. Drive: 12 plays, 54 yards, 1:44.

Third quarter

- KU – Laith Marjan 33-yard field goal, 7:07, Knights 20–17. Drive: 10 plays, 59 yards, 5:46.
- KU – Laith Marjan 41-yard field goal, 4:01, Tied 20–20. Drive: 6 plays, 46 yards, 2:24.
- KU – Leshon Williams 2-yard run (Laith Marjan kick), 3:00, Jayhawks 27–20. Drive: 1 play, 2 yards, 0:05.

Fourth quarter

- No scoring plays.

Statistics	KU	UCF
First downs	15	21
Plays–yards	58–356	76–375
Rushes–yards	32–121	39–199
Passing yards	235	176
Passing: comp–att–int	18–26–0	22–37–0
Turnovers	0	1
Time of possession	30:01	29:59

Team	Category	Player	Statistics
Kansas	Passing	Jalon Daniels	18/26, 235 yards
Kansas	Rushing	Leshon Williams	12 carries, 58 yards, 3 TD
Kansas	Receiving	Cam Pickett	5 receptions, 64 yards
UCF	Passing	Tayven Jackson	14/23, 97 yards
UCF	Rushing	Myles Montgomery	22 carries, 110 yards, 2 TD
UCF	Receiving	Duane Thomas Jr.	5 receptions, 42 yards

=== at No. 9 Texas Tech ===
Kansas Jayhawks (4–2) at No. 9 Texas Tech Red Raiders (5–0) – Game summary

Quarter	1	2	3	4	Total
Jayhawks	0	17	0	0	17
No. 9 Red Raiders	18	3	7	14	42

at Jones AT&T Stadium • Lubbock, Texas

- Date: October 11
- Game time: 6:30 p.m.
- Game weather: Sunny • Temperature: 81 °F (27 °C) • Wind: SE 14 mph
- Game attendance: 60,229
- Referee: Kevin Boitmann
- TV announcers (FOX): Jason Benetti (play-by-play), Robert Griffin III (analyst), and Alexa Landestoy (sideline)

Game information

First quarter

- TTU – Cameron Dickey 71-yard run (Stone Harrington kick), 10:38. Red Raiders 7–0. Drive: 1 play, 71 yards, 0:11.
- TTU – Terrance Carter Jr. 21-yard pass from Behren Morton (Johncarlos Miller II run), 8:39. Red Raiders 15–0. Drive: 5 plays, 36 yards, 1:51.
- TTU – Upton Bellenfant 25-yard field goal, 3:38. Red Raiders 18–0. Drive: 11 plays, 69 yards, 3:31.

Second quarter

- TTU – Stone Harrington 40-yard field goal, 11:03. Red Raiders 21–0. Drive: 11 plays, 58 yards, 3:27.
- KU – Leshon Williams 10-yard pass from Jalon Daniels (Laith Marjan kick), 6:40. Red Raiders 21–7. Drive: 8 plays, 75 yards, 4:23.
- KU – Boden Groen 24-yard pass from Jalon Daniels (Laith Marjan kick), 1:17. Red Raiders 21–14. Drive: 6 plays, 49 yards, 1:04.
- KU – Laith Marjan 55-yard field goal, 0:00. Red Raiders 21–17. Drive: 5 plays, 29 yards, 0:28.

Third quarter

- TTU – Will Hammond 20-yard run (Upton Bellenfant kick), 7:28. Red Raiders 28–17. Drive: 5 plays, 63 yards, 2:03.

Fourth quarter

- TTU – Cameron Dickey 55-yard run (Stone Harrington kick), 14:12. Red Raiders 35–17. Drive: 6 plays, 80 yards, 2:00.
- TTU – Will Hammond 10-yard run (Upton Bellenfant kick), 3:31. Red Raiders 42–17. Drive: 2 plays, 30 yards, 0:55.

Statistics	KU	TTU
First downs	23	22
Plays–yards	77–319	68–505
Rushes–yards	38–47	40–372
Passing yards	272	133
Passing: comp–att–int	30–39–0	14–28–1
Turnovers	1	1
Time of possession	36:12	23:48

Team	Category	Player	Statistics
Kansas	Passing	Jalon Daniels	27/33, 255 yards, 2 TD
Kansas	Rushing	Daniel Hishaw Jr.	8 carries, 53 yards
Kansas	Receiving	Boden Groen	13 receptions, 76 yards, TD
Texas Tech	Passing	Behren Morton	7/12, 91 yards, TD
Texas Tech	Rushing	Cameron Dickey	21 carries, 263 yards, 2 TD
Texas Tech	Receiving	Caleb Douglas	6 receptions, 55 yards

=== vs Kansas State (Sunflower Showdown) ===
Kansas State Wildcats (3–4) at Kansas Jayhawks (4–3) – Game summary

Quarter	1	2	3	4	Total
Wildcats	21	0	14	7	42
Jayhawks	7	7	3	0	17

at David Booth Kansas Memorial Stadium • Lawrence, Kansas

- Date: October 25
- Game time: 11:00 a.m.
- Game weather: 54°, Rain, Wind SE 9 mph
- Game attendance: 41,525
- Referee: Henry Johns
- TV announcers (TNT/TruTV): J.B. Long (play-by-play), Mike Golic Jr. (analyst) and Coy Wire (sideline reporter)

Game information

First quarter

- KU – Jalon Daniels 6-yard run (Laith Marjan kick), 12:50. Jayhawks 7–0. Drive: 5 plays, 25 yards, 2:06.
- KSU – Avery Johnson 2-yard run (Luis Rodriguez kick), 9:50. Tied 7–7. Drive: 7 plays, 82 yards, 2:56.
- KSU – Ralph Ortiz 20-yard fumble return (Luis Rodriguez kick), 9:16. Wildcats 14–7.
- KSU – Jaron Tibbs 27-yard pass from Avery Johnson (Luis Rodriguez kick), 0:12. Wildcats 21–7. Drive: 5 plays, 72 yards, 2:15.

Second quarter

- KU – Daniel Hishaw Jr. 3-yard run (Laith Marjan kick), 0:30. Wildcats 21–14. Drive: 18 plays, 85 yards, 8:34.

Third quarter

- KSU – DeVon Rice 1-yard run (Luis Rodriguez kick), 7:23. Wildcats 28–14. Drive: 7 plays, 42 yards, 3:47.
- KU – Laith Marjan 47-yard field goal, 1:21. Wildcats 28–17. Drive: 12 plays, 45 yards, 6:02.
- KSU – Jayce Brown 78-yard pass from Avery Johnson (Luis Rodriguez kick), 1:03. Wildcats 35–17. Drive: 1 play, 78 yards, 0:13.

Fourth quarter

- KSU – Avery Johnson 3-yard run (Luis Rodriguez kick), 4:17. Wildcats 42–17. Drive: 10 plays, 30 yards, 6:16.

Statistics	KSU	KU
First downs	18	17
Plays–yards	53-371	77-247
Rushes–yards	36-140	40-110
Passing yards	231	137
Passing: comp–att–int	11-17-0	18-37-2
Turnovers	1	4
Time of possession	27:20	32:40

Team	Category	Player	Statistics
Kansas State	Passing	Avery Johnson	11/17, 231 yards, 2 TD
Kansas State	Rushing	Joe Jackson	20 carries, 69 yards
Kansas State	Receiving	Jayce Brown	4 receptions, 160 yards, TD
Kansas	Passing	Jalon Daniels	17/35, 129 yards, INT
Kansas	Rushing	Daniel Hishaw Jr.	19 carries, 67 yards, TD
Kansas	Receiving	Cam Pickett	6 receptions, 40 yards

=== vs Oklahoma State ===
Oklahoma State Cowboys (1–7) at Kansas Jayhawks (4–4) – Game summary

Quarter	1	2	3	4	Total
Cowboys	7	0	7	7	21
Jayhawks	3	7	14	14	38

at David Booth Kansas Memorial Stadium • Lawrence, Kansas

- Date: November 1
- Game time: 3:00 p.m.
- Game weather: Cloudy • Temperature: 49 °F (9 °C) • Wind: NW at 10 mph (16 km/h)
- Game attendance: 39,511
- Referee: Stephen Barron
- TV announcers (ESPN+): Mark Neely (play-by-play) and Leger Douzable (analyst)

Game information

First quarter

- (10:40) OKST – Shamar Rigby 12-yard pass from Zane Flores, Logan Ward kick (Drive: 10 plays, 75 yards, 4:20; OKST 7–0)
- (3:56) KAN – Laith Marjan 39-yard field goal (Drive: 13 plays, 59 yards, 6:40; OKST 7–3)

Second quarter

- (3:23) KAN – Daniel Hishaw Jr. 3-yard run, Laith Marjan kick (Drive: 15 plays, 73 yards, 6:55; KAN 10–7)

Third quarter

- (10:19) KAN – Boden Groen 3-yard pass from Jalon Daniels, Laith Marjan kick (Drive: 10 plays, 75 yards, 4:41; KAN 17–7)
- (6:55) KAN – Bryson Canty 5-yard pass from Jalon Daniels, Latin Marjan kick (Drive: 3 plays, 54 yards, 1:22; KAN 24–7)
- (1:55) OKST – Gavin Freeman 10-yard pass from Zane Flores, Logan Ward kick (Drive: 10 plays, 75 yards, 5:00; KAN 24–14)

Fourth quarter

- (13:49) KAN – Daniel Hishaw Jr. 3-yard run, Laith Marjan kick (Drive: 6 plays, 44 yards, 2:57; KAN 31–14)
- (6:04) KAN – Leshon Williams 5-yard run, Laith Marjan kick (Drive: 10 plays, 39 yards, 6:31; KAN 38–14)
- (1:19) OKST – Sesi Vailahi 2-yard run, Logan Ward kick (Drive: 11 plays, 75 yards, 4:45; KAN 38–21)

Statistics	OKST	KU
First downs	19	18
Plays–yards	62–316	58–342
Rushes–yards	31–72	59–232
Passing yards	244	110
Passing: comp–att–int	24–31–0	13–19–0
Turnovers	0	0
Time of possession	29:22	30:38

Team	Category	Player	Statistics
Oklahoma State	Passing	Zane Flores	22/28, 235 yards, 2 TD
Oklahoma State	Rushing	Rodney Fields Jr.	15 carries, 56 yards
Oklahoma State	Receiving	Gavin Freeman	7 receptions, 78 yards, TD
Kansas	Passing	Jalon Daniels	13/19, 110 yards, 2 TD, INT
Kansas	Rushing	Leshon Willians	14 carries, 77 yards, TD
Kansas	Receiving	Leyton Cure	2 receptions, 32 yards

=== at Arizona ===
Kansas Jayhawks (5–4) at Arizona Wildcats (5–3) – Game summary

Quarter	1	2	3	4	Total
Jayhawks	7	10	3	0	20
Wildcats	7	7	3	7	24

at Arizona Stadium • Tucson, Arizona

- Date: November 8
- Game time: 2:30 p.m.
- Game weather: Sunny, 82 °F (28 °C)
- Game attendance: 41,115
- Referee: Michael VanderVelde
- TV announcers (ESPN2): Mike Monaco (play-by-play), Kirk Morrison (analyst) and Dawn Davenport (sideline)

Game information

First quarter

- (7:16) ARIZ – Sam Olson 16-yard pass from Noah Fifita, Michael Salgado-Medina kick (Drive: 8 plays, 78 yards, 3:15; Arizona 7–0)
- (0:32) KAN – Jalon Daniels 1-yard run, Laith Marjan kick (Drive: 5 plays, 46 yards, 2:05; Tied 7–7)

Second quarter

- (11:17) KAN – Emmanuel Henderson 24-yard pass from Jalon Daniels, Laith Marjan kick (Drive: 6 plays, 78 yards, 3:01; Kansas 14–7)
- (4:15) KAN – Laith Marjan 46-yard field goal (Drive: 8 plays, 29 yards, 4:03; Kansas 17–7)
- (0:23) ARIZ – Quincy Craig 8-yard pass from Noah Fifita, Michael Salgado-Medina kick (Drive: 11 plays, 75 yards, 3:52; Kansas 17–14)

Third quarter

- (11:23) ARIZ – Michael Salgado-Medina 41-yard field goal (Drive: 6 plays, 62 yards, 2:04; Tied 17–17)
- (5:51) KAN – Laith Marjan 50-yard field goal (Drive: 10 plays, 43 yards, 5:32; Kansas 20–17)

Fourth quarter

- (0:39) ARIZ – Quincy Craig 24-yard run, Michael Salgado-Medina kick (Drive: 8 plays, 80 yards, 2:00; Arizona 24–20)

Statistics	KU	ARIZ
First downs	19	18
Plays–yards	70–369	60–323
Rushes–yards	40–170	29–165
Passing yards	199	158
Passing: comp–att–int	15–30–0	16–31–0
Turnovers	0	0
Time of possession	35:30	24:10

Team	Category	Player	Statistics
Kansas	Passing	Jalon Daniels	15/29, 199 yards, TD
Kansas	Rushing	Jalon Daniels	14 carries, 74 yards, TD
Kansas	Receiving	Emmanuel Henderson	5 receptions, 65 yards, TD
Arizona	Passing	Noah Fifita	16/31, 158 yards, 2 TD
Arizona	Rushing	Ismail Mahdi	7 carries, 61 yards
Arizona	Receiving	Gio Richardson	2 receptions, 38 yards

=== at Iowa State ===
Kansas Jayhawks (5–5) at Iowa State Cyclones (6–4) – Game summary

Quarter	1	2	3	4	Total
Jayhawks	0	0	14	0	14
Cyclones	7	10	14	7	38

at Jack Trice Stadium • Ames, Iowa

- Date: November 22
- Game time: 11:00 a.m.
- Game weather:
- Game attendance: 58,275
- Referee: Kevin Boitmann
- TV announcers (FS1): Noah Reed (play-by-play) and Robert Smith (analyst)

Game information

First quarter

- ISU – Brett Eskildsen 9-yard pass from Rocco Becht (Kyle Konrardy kick), 8:23. Cyclones 7–0. Drive: 12 plays, 75 yards, 6:37.

Second quarter

- ISU – Carson Hansen 4-yard run (Kyle Konrardy kick), 14:56. Cyclones 14–0. Drive: 10 plays, 72 yards, 5:24.
- ISU – Kyle Konrardy 55-yard field goal, 6:43. Cyclones 17–0. Drive: 7 plays, 40 yards, 3:49.

Third quarter

- KU – Leshon Williams 4-yard run (Laith Marjan kick), 13:06. Cyclones 17–7. Drive: 4 plays, 65 yards, 1:54.
- ISU – Brett Eskilden 20-yard pass from Rocco Becht (Kyle Konrardy kick), 8:52. Cyclones 24–7. Drive: 8 plays, 75 yards, 4:14.
- KU – Boden Groen 21-yard pass from Cole Ballard (Laith Marjan kick), 7:35. Cyclones 24–14. Drive: 4 plays, 62 yards, 1:08.
- ISU – Benjamin Brahmer 12-yard pass from Rocco Becht (Kyle Konrardy kick), 2:18. Cyclones 31–14. Drive: 10 plays, 59 yards, 5:08.

Fourth quarter

- ISU – Aiden Flora 38-yard run (Kyle Konrardy kick), 1:07. Cyclones 38–14. Drive: 9 plays, 84 yards, 5:54.

Statistics	KU	ISU
First downs	17	25
Plays–yards	50–323	73–462
Rushes–yards	21–132	50–221
Passing yards	191	241
Passing: comp–att–int	16–29–1	18–23–0
Turnovers	1	0
Time of possession	20:52	39:08

Team	Category	Player	Statistics
Kansas	Passing	Jalon Daniels	13/23, 154 yards, INT
Kansas	Rushing	Daniel Hishaw Jr.	8 carries, 50 yards
Kansas	Receiving	Boden Groen	5 receptions, 76 yards, TD
Iowa State	Passing	Rocco Becht	18/23, 241 yards, 3 TD
Iowa State	Rushing	Carson Hansen	22 carries, 120 yards, TD
Iowa State	Receiving	Brett Eskildsen	6 receptions, 73 yards, 2 TD

=== vs No. 13 Utah ===
No. 13 Utah Utes (9-2) at Kansas Jayhawks (5-6) – Game summary

Quarter	1	2	3	4	Total
No. 13 Utes	3	7	0	21	31
Jayhawks	0	7	7	7	21

at David Booth Kansas Memorial Stadium • Lawrence, Kansas

- Date: November 28
- Game time: 11:00 a.m.
- Game weather: Sunny • Temperature: 33 °F (1 °C) • Wind: SE at 10 miles per hour (16 km/h)
- Game attendance: 32,811
- Referee: Mike McCabe
- TV announcers (ESPN): Anish Shroff (play-by-play), Andre Ware (analyst) and Paul Carcaterra (sideline)

Game information

First quarter

- UTAH – Dillon Curtis 34-yard field goal, 8:39. Utes 3–0. Drive: 6 plays, 49 yards, 2:41.

Second quarter

- KU – Daniel Hishaw Jr. 7-yard run (Laith Marjan kick), 12:03. Jayhawks 7–3. Drive: 8 plays, 73 yards, 3:57.
- UTAH – JJ Buchanan 58-yard pass from Devon Dampier (Dillon Curtis kick), 9:24. Utes 10–7. Drive: 6 plays, 75 yards, 2:39.

Third quarter

- KU – Jalon Daniels 1-yard run (Laith Marjan kick), 8:15. Jayhawks 14–10. Drive: 8 plays, 67 yards, 3:54.

Fourth quarter

- UTAH – Larry Simmons 28-yard pass from Devon Dampier (Dillon Curtis kick), 12:26. Utes 17–14. Drive: 4 plays, 80 yards, 1:13.
- UTAH – Elijah Davis 97-yard interception return (Dillon Curtis kick), 7:52. Utes 24–14.
- KU – Leyton Cure 21-yard pass from Jalon Daniels (Laith Marjan kick), 5:32. Utes 24–21. Drive: 8 plays, 93 yards, 2:14.
- UTAH – Larry Simmons 48-yard pass from Devon Dampier (Dillon Curtis kick), 2:14. Utes 31–21. Drive: 8 plays, 85 yards, 3:14.

Statistics	UTAH	KU
First downs	18	26
Plays–yards	56–414	78–477
Rushes–yards	31–161	51–290
Passing yards	253	187
Passing: comp–att–int	15–25–0	10–27–3
Turnovers	0	3
Time of possession	23:03	36:57

Team	Category	Player	Statistics
Utah	Passing	Devon Dampier	15/25, 253 yards, 3 TD
Utah	Rushing	Wayshawn Parker	12 carries, 95 yards
Utah	Receiving	Larry Simmons	3 receptions, 97 yards, 2 TD
Kansas	Passing	Jalon Daniels	10/27, 187 yards, TD, 3 INT
Kansas	Rushing	Daniel Hishaw Jr.	22 carries, 107 yards, TD
Kansas	Receiving	Emmanuel Henderson	3 receptions, 113 yards

== Roster ==
2025 Kansas Jayhawks football team roster
Players
Coaches
Offense

Pos.	#	Name	Class
RB	0	Harry Stewart III	Fr
WR	2	Emmanuel Henderson	Sr
WR	3	Keaton Kubecka	So
RB	4	Leshon Williams	Sr
WR	5	Doug Emilien	Sr
QB	6	Jalon Daniels	Sr
WR	7	Cam Pickett	Jr
QB	8	Isaiah Marshall	Fr
RB	9	Daniel Hishaw Jr.	Sr
WR	10	Levi Wentz	Sr
WR	11	Bryson Canty	Sr
WR	12	Bryson Hayes	Fr
WR	13	Bryce Cohoon	So
QB	14	Mikey Pauley	Jr
QB	15	Cole Ballard	So
QB	16	David McComb	Fr
TE	17	Jaden Hamm	So
TE	18	DeShawn Hanika	Sr
RB	20	Johnny Thompson Jr.	So
RB	22	Micah Johnson	Fr
RB	24	John Kelly	Fr
RB	25	Justin Thurman	Fr
RB	38	Jack Schneider	So
TE	44	Carson Bruhn	Fr
OL	50	David Abajian	Fr
OL	52	Tyler Mercer	So
OL	54	Tavake Tuikolovatu	So
OL	55	Kene Anene	Fr
OL	56	Amir Herring	So
OL	57	Hank Kelly	Sr
OL	58	Kael Farkes	Jr
OL	59	Nolan Gorczyca	Sr
OL	61	Bryce Foster	Sr
OL	65	Carter Lavrusky	Fr
OL	67	Eli Richmond	Fr
OL	70	Kobe Baynes	Sr
OL	71	James Livingston	Jr
OL	72	DeAndre Harper	So
OL	73	Anderson Kopp	Fr
OL	74	Jack Tanner	So
OL	75	Calvin Clements	So
OL	76	Antonio Wilson	So
OL	77	Enrique Cruz Jr.	Sr
OL	78	Greydon Grimes	Fr
WR	80	Mack Moeller	Sr
TE	81	Quinton Conley	Jr
WR	82	Israel Moses V	So
TE	83	Conlee Hovey	Fr
WR	84	Jaden Nickens	Fr
WR	85	Tate Nagy	Fr
WR	86	Donald Collier	Fr
TE	87	Leyton Cure	Sr
TE	88	Boden Groen	Sr
WR	89	Jackson Cook	Fr

Defense

Pos.	#	Name	Class
CB	0	Austin Alexander	Fr
LB	1	Bangally Kamara	Sr
S	2	Lyrik Rawls	Sr
LB	3	Joseph Sipp Jr.	Sr
LB	4	Trey Lathan	Jr
DE	5	Dean Miller	Sr
CB	6	Jahlil Hurley	So
CB	7	DJ Graham II	Sr
LB	8	Jon Jon Kamara	Fr
DE	9	Dakyus Brinkley	Fr
LB	10	Jayson Gilliom	Sr
S	11	Devin Dye	Sr
S	12	Laquan Robinson	Jr
DE	13	Dylan Brooks	Sr
S	14	Jalen Dye	Sr
DE	15	Justice Finkley	Sr
LB	16	Logan Brantley	So
S	17	Brandon Schmelzle	Fr
S	18	Damani Maxson	Fr
CB	19	Chris McCorkle	Fr
LB	20	Malachi Curvey	Fr
CB	22	Syeed Gibbs	Jr
S	23	Mason Ellis	Jr
S	24	Darrion Jones	Fr
DE	25	Caleb Redd	Fr
CB	26	Jalen Todd	So
S	27	Taylor Davis	So
LB	28	JaCorey Stewart	Fr
CB	29	Jameel Croft Jr.	So
CB	30	Aundre Gibson	Fr
S	31	Landon Nelson	Sr
DE	33	Leroy Harris III	So
CB	36	Jameer Moore	Fr
LB	39	Cole Mondi	Sr
S	40	Colter McDaniel	Fr
LB	41	Ezra Vedral	So
DE	45	Garrett Martin	Fr
CB	47	Jacoby Davis	So
DT	52	D.J. Withers	Sr
DT	56	Marcus Calvin	So
DL	70	Jason Strickland	Fr
DT	71	Grady Seyfert	So
DE	90	Adrian Holley	Fr
DE	91	Alex Bray	Jr
DT	92	Tommy Dunn Jr.	Sr
DT	93	Josiah Hammond	Fr
DT	94	Blake Herold	So
DE	96	Cole Petrus	Sr
DT	97	Kenean Caldwell	Sr
DL	99	Gage Keys	Sr

Special teams

Pos.	#	Name	Class
P	35	Finn Lappin	Sr
P	37	Grayden Addison	Sr
LS	49	Hollis Moeller	Fr
LS	51	Emory Duggar	Sr
P	95	Efren Jasso	Sr
PK	98	Dane Efird	Fr
PK	99	Laith Marjan	Sr

Head coach

- Lance Leipold

Coordinators/assistant coaches

- Jim Zebrowski OC
- Matt Lubick Co-OC/TE
- D. K. McDonald DC
- Chris Simpson LB
- Daryl Agpalsa OL
- Taiwo Onatolu DE/ST
- Jim Panagos DT
- Terrence Samuel WR
- Brandon Shelby DB
- Jonathan Wallace RB

Legend

- (C) Team captain
- (S) Suspended
- (I) Ineligible
- Injured
- Redshirt

Roster
