= 2025 Oklahoma State Cowboys football team =

American college football season

2025 Oklahoma State Cowboys football
- Conference: Big 12 Conference
- Record: 1–11 (0–9 Big 12)
- Head coach: Mike Gundy (21st season; first 3 games); Doug Meacham (interim; remainder of season)
- Offensive coordinator: Doug Meacham (1st season)
- Offensive scheme: Spread
- Defensive coordinator: Todd Grantham (1st season; first 4 games); Clint Bowen (interim; remainder of season)
- Base defense: 3–4
- Home stadium: Boone Pickens Stadium

2025 Big 12 Conference football standings
	Conf.			Overall
Team	W		L	W		L
No. 7 Texas Tech y$^	8	–	1	12	–	2
No. 11 BYU y	8	–	1	12	–	2
No. 14 Utah	7	–	2	11	–	2
No. 22 Houston	6	–	3	10	–	3
Arizona	6	–	3	9	–	4
Arizona State	6	–	3	8	–	5
No. 25 TCU	5	–	4	9	–	4
Iowa State	5	–	4	8	–	4
Cincinnati	5	–	4	7	–	6
Kansas State	5	–	4	6	–	6
Baylor	3	–	6	5	–	7
Kansas	3	–	6	5	–	7
UCF	2	–	7	5	–	7
West Virginia	2	–	7	4	–	8
Colorado	1	–	8	3	–	9
Oklahoma State	0	–	9	1	–	11
Championship: Texas Tech 34, BYU 7
^ – College Football Playoff participant; $ – Conference champion; y – Championship game participant; Rankings from AP Poll

The 2025 Oklahoma State Cowboys football team represented Oklahoma State University as a member of the Big 12 Conference during the 2025 NCAA Division I FBS football season. The Cowboys played home games at Boone Pickens Stadium located in Stillwater, Oklahoma.

They were led by Mike Gundy in his 21st year as their head coach until his firing on September 23. Offensive coordinator Doug Meacham served as interim head coach for the remainder of the season. On November 25, North Texas head coach Eric Morris was named the Cowboys' new head coach.

The season began with Gundy sitting on one of the hottest seats in the nation. After a 69–3 blowout to Oregon in week 2, fans started calling for Gundy's firing, even more so during the team's home loss to Tulsa, where fans began chanting "Fire Gundy". This was the worst season for Oklahoma State since their winless 1991 campaign, and the most ever losses the team has had in one season. Oklahoma State remained winless against FBS opponents, and losing to Tulsa for the first time since 1998.

During the October 11 home game against Houston, a Cowboys fan named Trent Eaton stood in an empty section of Boone Pickens Stadium bare-chested, twirling his shirt above his head on a dare from his sister, who offered him $10 to do it. Eventually, others joined Eaton, and they filled the section, attracting attention on the TNT broadcast and, afterward, on social media. Cowboys fans continued doing this at home games for the remainder of the season, and fans of other college football teams across the country did so as well. The action was eventually labeled "Tarps Off". In 2026, fans at Major League Baseball and College World Series games continued the trend.

== Offseason ==
=== Outgoing transfers ===
Player	Position	Height	Weight	Year	New team
Jason Brooks	IOL	6'4	290	Redshirt senior	Houston
Lyrik Rawls	S	6'1	180	Redshirt junior	Kansas
Willie Nelson	S	5'8.5	165	Freshman	Tyler JC
Andrew McCall	LB	6'3	225	Redshirt freshman	Harding
Wiley Sills	OL	6'1	271	Redshirt freshman	Stephen F. Austin
Braden Baize	WR	5'11	202	Redshirt freshman	UT Rio Grande Valley
Isaia Glass	OT	6'5	245	Redshirt junior	Vanderbilt
Drake Tabor	K	6'0	170	Redshirt junior	UT Martin
Garret Wilson	QB	6'2	215	Freshman	North Central
Hudson Kaak	P	6'1	190	Sophomore	Auburn
Kendal Daniels	S	6'4	190	Redshirt junior	Oklahoma
De'Zhaun Stribling	WR	6'2	195	Redshirt junior	Ole Miss
Marcus Dockins Jr.	WR	6'2	190	Redshirt sophomore	Southwestern Oklahoma State
Ashton Isaacs	OL	6'5	300	Freshman	
A. J. Ridener	NT	6'1	320	Redshirt sophomore	Missouri S&T
CJ Williams	RB	5'10	195	Redshirt freshman	Coffeyville CC
Kam Franklin	S	6'2	190	Redshirt freshman	Louisiana Tech
AJ Green	RB	5'11	194	Senior	Arkansas
Cutter Greene	WR	6'0	185	Freshman	Emporia State
De'Kelvion Beamon	CB	6'1	180	Redshirt junior	Lamar
Wyatt Holmes	OL	6'1	294	Redshirt freshman	
Aiden Isaacs	OL	6'3	280	Freshman	
Jaedon Foreman	Edge	6'3	250	Redshirt freshman	Coffeyville CC
Christian Hurd	S	5'8	190	Redshirt freshman	
Tywon Wray Jr.	S	6'3	180	Redshirt freshman	South Alabama
Evan Smith	CB	5'9	170	Redshirt sophomore	
Luke McEndoo	TE	6'1	265	Redshirt junior	Nevada
Gabe Brown	LB	6'2	206	Redshirt sophomore	Abilene Christian
Jeff Roberson	LB	6'2	215	Redshirt senior	Minnesota
Demerick Morris	DL	6'3	285	Senior	Temple
RJ Lester	CB	6'2	185	Redshirt freshman	UTSA
Maealiuaki Smith	QB	6'3.5	200	Freshman	Ole Miss
Justin Crutchmer	LB	5'10	205	Redshirt freshman	Ouachita Baptist
Talon Kendrick	S	6'0	220	Freshman	Central Oklahoma
David Arriaga	K	6'2	205	Freshman	Fort Hays State
Kyler Pearson	WR	5'8	150	Redshirt senior	East Carolina
Ty Williams	S	6'1	186	Redshirt junior	Tulsa
Jonathan Agumdu	LB	6'2	220	Freshman	North Carolina
Jaelen Tucker	NT	6'1	230	Redshirt sophomore	
Chauncey Johnson	OT	6'5	290	Freshman	Ouachita Baptist
Jordan Owens	TE	6'6	255	Senior	North Carolina
Chase Pinkston	WR	6'1	170	Sophomore	Memphis
Tykie Andrews	WR	6'1	180	Redshirt freshman	Central Oklahoma
Garret Rangel	QB	6'2	174	Redshirt sophomore	Virginia Tech
Yamil Talib	LB	6'2	240	Freshman	Charlotte
Todd Drummond	QB	6'4	205	Redshirt freshman	Emporia State
Justin Kirkland	DL	6'4	295	Junior	BYU
Ty Walls	WR	6'0	175	Redshirt freshmen	Southern Illinois
Christopher Robinson	LB	6'1	220	Sophomore	
Reed DeQuasie	S	6'1	202	Redshirt freshmen	Oklahoma

=== Additions ===
==== Incoming transfers ====
Player	Position	Height	Weight	Year	Former team
Brandon Rawls	LB	6'2	240	Redshirt junior	Saginaw Valley State
Kasen Carpenter	IOL	6'3	265	Sophomore	Tulsa
Michael Diatta	DL	6'5	265	Senior	Virginia
Demerick Morris	DL	6'3	285	Senior	Temple
Kalib Hicks	RB	5'11	215	Redshirt sophomore	Oklahoma
Jordan Owens	TE	6'6	255	Senior	Central Arkansas
Lavaka Taukeiaho	IOL	6'4	315	Redshirt freshman	Weber State
Kyran Duhon	DL	6'1	235	Freshman	UTEP
Oscar Hammond	TE	6'4	210	Junior	North Texas
Jakailin Johnson	CB	6'1	175	Redshirt junior	LSU
Bryan McCoy	LB	6'0	225	Junior	Akron
Malik Charles	DL	6'5	255	Junior	West Georgia
Mordecai McDaniel	S	6'1	195	Redshirt junior	Charlotte
Jaylin Davies	CB	6'1	155	Redshirt junior	UCLA
Chase Barry	P	6'4	208	Redshirt junior	UCLA
Will Monney	TE	6'4	205	Sophomore	Utah State
Gabe Panikowski	K	5'10	200	Senior	Idaho State
Trip White	LB	6'2	200	Redshirt sophomore	Ole Miss
Sitiveni Kaufusi	DL	6'3	240	Redshirt senior	UCLA
Louie Canepa	OT	6'4	295	Junior	New Mexico State
Shamar Rigby	WR	6'5	170	Freshman	Purdue
Hauss Hejny	QB	6'0	190	Redshirt freshman	TCU
Sam Jackson	WR	5'11	170	Redshirt junior	Auburn
Jaylen Lloyd	WR	5'11	180	Sophomore	Nebraska
DeAndre Boykins	CB	5'11	210	Senior	North Carolina
Freddie Brock	RB	5'10	170	Senior	Georgia State
Cam Abshire	WR	6'4	184	Redshirt sophomore	Emory and Henry
Wendell Gregory	Edge	6'3	220	Freshman	South Carolina
Christian Fitzpatrick	WR	6'4	210	Redshirt senior	Marshall
Terrill Davis	WR	6'0	180	Redshirt junior	Central Oklahoma
Markell Samuel	OT	6'4	265	Redshirt junior	Appalachian State
Zaquan Patterson	S	6'0.5	190	Freshman	Miami (FL)
De'Marion Thomas	DL	6'4	325	Sophomore	Vanderbilt
Darius Thomas	LB	6'2	212	Redshirt junior	Louisville
Taje McCoy	LB	6'3	245	Redshirt freshman	Colorado
Eric Fletcher	CB	6'1	175	Redshirt freshman	East Carolina
Bob Schick	IOL	6'6	305	Redshirt senior	Virginia Tech
Banks Bowen	QB	6'3	190	Freshman	Tulsa
Carson Su'esu'e	TE	6'4	200	Freshman	BYU
Grayson Brousseau	TE	6'6	220	Freshman	Utah State
Grant Seagren	OT	6'6	305	Redshirt sophomore	Nebraska

==== Recruiting ====
College recruiting
Name	Hometown	School	Height	Weight	Commit date
Martrail Lopez; ATH	Idabel, OK	Idabel High School	5 ft 9 in (1.75 m)	150 lb (68 kg)	Feb 4, 2024
Martrail Lopez; ATH	Recruit ratings: Rivals: 247Sports: ESPN: (74)				
Jaylan Beckley; IOL	Addison, TX	Trinity Christian Academy	6 ft 3.5 in (1.92 m)	300 lb (140 kg)	Apr 5, 2024
Jaylan Beckley; IOL	Recruit ratings: Rivals: 247Sports: ESPN: (79)				
Ryker Haff; IOL	Owasso, OK	Owasso High School	6 ft 5.5 in (1.97 m)	310 lb (140 kg)	Apr 10, 2024
Ryker Haff; IOL	Recruit ratings: Rivals: 247Sports: ESPN: (77)				
Kameron Powell; WR	McKinney, TX	McKinney North High School	6 ft 1 in (1.85 m)	185 lb (84 kg)	Apr 14, 2024
Kameron Powell; WR	Recruit ratings: Rivals: 247Sports: ESPN: (77)				
Royal Capell; WR	Cibolo, TX	Steele High School	5 ft 10 in (1.78 m)	185 lb (84 kg)	Apr 16, 2024
Royal Capell; WR	Recruit ratings: Rivals: 247Sports: ESPN: (77)				
Jaden Perez; WR	San Antonio, Texas	Brandeis High School	6 ft 1 in (1.85 m)	165 lb (75 kg)	Apr 19, 2024
Jaden Perez; WR	Recruit ratings: Rivals: 247Sports: ESPN: (78)				
Jordan Vyborny; TE	Draper, UT	Corner Canyon High School	6 ft 5 in (1.96 m)	230 lb (100 kg)	May 2, 2024
Jordan Vyborny; TE	Recruit ratings: Rivals: 247Sports: ESPN: (78)				
DJ Dugar; RB	Leander, TX	Glenn High School	6 ft 0.5 in (1.84 m)	205 lb (93 kg)	Jun 15, 2024
DJ Dugar; RB	Recruit ratings: Rivals: 247Sports: ESPN: (77)				
Ayden Webb; S	Dallas, TX	Lake Highlands High School	6 ft 3 in (1.91 m)	160 lb (73 kg)	Jun 19, 2024
Ayden Webb; S	Recruit ratings: Rivals: 247Sports: ESPN: (75)				
Michael Riles; EDGE	Port Arthur, TX	Memorial High School	6 ft 2.5 in (1.89 m)	235 lb (107 kg)	Jun 20, 2024
Michael Riles; EDGE	Recruit ratings: Rivals: 247Sports: ESPN: (80)				
Kobi Foreman; CB	Richardson, TX	Berkner High School	5 ft 11 in (1.80 m)	165 lb (75 kg)	Jun 28, 2024
Kobi Foreman; CB	Recruit ratings: Rivals: 247Sports: ESPN: (77)				
Carl'veon Young; LB	Oklahoma City, OK	Carl Albert High School	6 ft 4 in (1.93 m)	215 lb (98 kg)	Nov 6, 2024
Carl'veon Young; LB	Recruit ratings: Rivals: 247Sports: ESPN: (76)				
Rashod Bradley; DL	Lake City, FL	Columbia High School	6 ft 3 in (1.91 m)	240 lb (110 kg)	Nov 26, 2024
Rashod Bradley; DL	Recruit ratings: Rivals: 247Sports: ESPN: (70)				
Simona Fuailetolo; OT	Saint George, UT	Desert Hills High School	6 ft 6 in (1.98 m)	290 lb (130 kg)	Nov 26, 2024
Simona Fuailetolo; OT	Recruit ratings: Rivals: 247Sports: ESPN: (70)				
Chandavian Bradley; EDGE	Platte city, MO	Platte County High School	6 ft 4.5 in (1.94 m)	221 lb (100 kg)	Nov 29, 2024
Chandavian Bradley; EDGE	Recruit ratings: Rivals: 247Sports: ESPN: (77)				
Miquel Chavez; IOL	Muskogee, OK	Muskogee High School	6 ft 5 in (1.96 m)	285 lb (129 kg)	Dec 3, 2024
Miquel Chavez; IOL	Recruit ratings: Rivals: 247Sports: ESPN: (73)				
Chase Pinkston; WR	Hattiesburg, MS	Oak Grove High School	6 ft 1 in (1.85 m)	170 lb (77 kg)	Dec 4, 2024
Chase Pinkston; WR	Recruit ratings: Rivals: 247Sports: ESPN: (78)				
Draden Fullbright; CB	Jesup, GA	Wayne County High School	5 ft 10 in (1.78 m)	160 lb (73 kg)	Dec 4, 2024
Draden Fullbright; CB	Recruit ratings: Rivals: 247Sports: ESPN: (77)				
Jotavion Pierce; S	Montgomery, AL	Montgomery Catholic High School	6 ft 2 in (1.88 m)	185 lb (84 kg)	Dec 4, 2024
Jotavion Pierce; S	Recruit ratings: Rivals: 247Sports: ESPN: (78)				
Carrington Pierce; S	Rancho Cucamonga, CA	Etiwanda High School	6 ft 2 in (1.88 m)	190 lb (86 kg)	Dec 23, 2024
Carrington Pierce; S	Recruit ratings: Rivals: 247Sports: ESPN: (76)				
Jeremy Cook; S	Hoover, AL	Hoover High School	6 ft 2 in (1.88 m)	190 lb (86 kg)	Dec 29, 2024
Jeremy Cook; S	Recruit ratings: Rivals: 247Sports:				
Overall recruit ranking: Rivals: 40 247Sports: 55
Note: In many cases, Scout, Rivals, 247Sports, On3, and ESPN may conflict in their listings of height and weight.; In these cases, the average was taken. ESPN grades are on a 100-point scale.; Sources: "Rivals commits". Rivals.; "ESPN commits". ESPN.; "2025 Team Ranking". Rivals.com.; "247Sports commits". 247Sports.

== Schedule ==
Date	Time	Opponent	Site	TV	Result	Attendance
August 28	6:30 p.m.	UT Martin*	Boone Pickens Stadium; Stillwater, OK	ESPN+	W 27–7	44,809
September 6	2:30 p.m.	at No. 6 Oregon*	Autzen Stadium; Eugene, OR	CBS	L 3–69	57,266
September 19	6:30 p.m.	Tulsa*	Boone Pickens Stadium; Stillwater, OK (rivalry)	ESPN	L 12–19	48,842
September 27	2:30 p.m.	Baylor	Boone Pickens Stadium; Stillwater, OK	ESPN2	L 27–45	45,689
October 4	2:00 p.m.	at Arizona	Arizona Stadium; Tucson, AZ	TNT	L 13–41	40,685
October 11	11:00 a.m.	Houston	Boone Pickens Stadium; Stillwater, OK	TNT/TruTV	L 17–39	44,941
October 18	7:00 p.m.	No. 24 Cincinnati^{†}	Boone Pickens Stadium; Stillwater, OK	ESPN2	L 17–49	46,901
October 25	3:00 p.m.	at No. 14 Texas Tech	Jones AT&T Stadium; Lubbock, TX	ESPNU	L 0–42	59,625
November 1	3:00 p.m.	at Kansas	David Booth Kansas Memorial Stadium; Lawrence, KS	ESPN+	L 21–38	39,511
November 15	11:00 a.m.	Kansas State	Boone Pickens Stadium; Stillwater, OK	ESPNU	L 6–14	46,340
November 22	3:00 p.m.	at UCF	Acrisure Bounce House; Orlando, FL	ESPN+	L 14–17	41,723
November 29	11:00 a.m.	Iowa State	Boone Pickens Stadium; Stillwater, OK	ESPNU	L 13–20	35,127
*Non-conference game; ^{†}Homecoming; Rankings from AP Poll - Released prior to game; All times are in Central time

== Personnel ==
2025 Oklahoma State Cowboys football team roster
Players
Coaches
Offense

Pos.	#	Name	Class
RB	1	Kalib Hicks	RSo
WR	2	Terrill Davis	RSr
WR	2	Talyn Shettron	RJr
RB	3	Sesi Vailahi	RSo
QB	4	Banks Bowen	Fr
WR	5	Da'Wain Lofton	RSr
QB	6	Zane Flores	RFr
WR	7	Shamar Rigby	So
QB	8	Hauss Hejny	RFr
WR	9	Ayo Shotomide-King	RJr
QB	10	Mason Schubert	Fr
WR	11	Royal Capell	Fr
QB	12	Noah Walters	RJr
WR	13	Tre' Griffiths	RFr
WR	14	Cam Abshire	RJr
WR	15	Kam Powell	Fr
WR	16	Christian Fitzpatrick	RSr
WR	17	Gavin Freeman	RJr
WR	18	Sam Jackson V	RSr
WR	19	Jaylen Lloyd	Jr
RB	20	Rodney Fields Jr.	RFr
RB	22	DJ Dugar Jr.	Fr
RB	24	Trent Howland	RSr
RB	25	Freddie Brock IV	RSr
RB	28	Jaden Allen-Hendrix	RFr
TE	40	Josh Ford	So
OL	51	Austin Kawecki	RJr
OL	52	Kasen Carpenter	RSo
OL	57	Simona Fuailetolo	Fr
OL	61	Matthew Wade	RFr
OL	62	Jamison Mejia	RSo
OL	63	Caleb Hackleman	RFr
OL	64	Jarrett Henry	RJr
OL	65	Jaylan Beckley	Fr
OL	66	Louie Canepa	RJr
OL	67	Ryker Haff	Fr
OL	69	Nuku Mafi	RFr
OL	70	Markell Samuel	RSr
OL	71	Tyler Brumfield	RJr
OL	72	Lavaka Taukeiaho	RJr
OL	73	Miguel Chavez	Fr
OL	74	Grant Seagren	RSo
OL	75	Jakobe Sanders	RSo
OL	76	Bob Schick	RSr
OL	77	Noah McKinney	RJr
OL	78	Davis Dotson	RJr
TE	80	Carson Su'esu'e	Fr
WR	81	Camron Heard	RSo
TE	82	Quinton Stewart	RSr
WR	83	Jaden Perez	Fr
WR	84	Matrail Lopez	Fr
TE	85	Grayson Brousseau	RFr
TE	86	Will Monney	Jr
TE	87	Oscar Hammond	Sr
TE	88	Jordan Vyborny	Fr
OL	89	Gage Stanaland	RSo

Defense

Pos.	#	Name	Class
OLB	0	Malik Charles	RJr
CB	1	JK Johnson	RSr
CB	2	Jaylin Davies	RSr
CB	3	Cam Smith	RSr
OLB	4	Wendell Gregory	RFr
LB	5	Bryan McCoy Jr.	Sr
LB	6	Brandon Rawls	RSr
S	7	Cameron Epps	RJr
S	8	Parker Robertson	RSr
CB	9	LaDainian Fields	RFr
CB	10	Kale Smith	RSr
S	11	Dylan Smith	Jr
S	12	Jeremy Cook Jr.	So
CB	13	Eric Fletcher	RFr
S	14	Landyn Cleveland	So
S	15	DeAndre Boykins	RSr
OLB	16	Chandavian Bradley	RSo
DT	17	Sitiveni Havili Kaufusi	RSr
S	18	David Kabongo	So
CB	20	Carrington Pierce	So
CB	22	Kobi Foreman	Fr
S	23	Kenneth Harris	RSr
LB	24	Darius Thomas	RJr
LB	25	Ike Esonwune	RSo
LB	26	Jacobi Oliphant Jr.	RFr
CB	27	Raymond Gay II	RSr
S	29	Cooper Lai	RSo
LB	30	Trip White	RJr
S	31	Jo Pierce	Fr
S	32	Mordecai McDaniel	RSr
DE	33	Kyran Duhon	So
OLB	35	Poasa Utu	RSo
S	36	Ayden Webb	Fr
CB	37	Draden Fullbright	Fr
LB	38	Carl'veon Young	Fr
OLB	40	Taje McCoy	RSo
DE	41	Michael Riles	Fr
DE	44	Rashod Bradley	Jr
OLB	46	Temerrick Johnson	RFr
LB	50	Gunnar Wilson	RFr
DT	54	Austin Young	RFr
DT	71	Aden Kelley	RSr
DT	81	Michael Diatta	RSr
DE	87	DeSean Brown	RJr
DE	88	Landon Dean	RJr
DE	94	Armstrong Nnodim	RFr
DE	95	Jaleel Johnson	RJr
DT	96	De'Marion Thomas	Jr
DT	98	Luke Webb	RFr
DT	99	Iman Oates	RSr

Special teams

Pos.	#	Name	Class
K	19	Logan Ward	RSr
K	39	Gabe Panikowski	Sr
LS	44	Shea Freibaum	Jr
P	49	Chase Barry	RJr
LS	53	Jaxson Duffield	Fr
LS	57	Aidan Davenport	RSr
K	59	Kason Shrum	RSr
P	90	Wes Pahl	RSr

Head coach

- Doug Meacham – Interim Head Coach/Offensive coordinator/inside receivers

Coordinators/assistant coaches

- Theron Aych – Wide receivers
- Cooper Bassett – Offensive line
- Clint Bowen – Interim defensive coordinator
- Greg Brown – Safeties
- Kap Dede – Linebackers
- Kevin Johns – Quarterbacks
- Andrew Mitchell – Offensive line
- Jules Montinar – Cornerbacks
- Ryan Osborn – Defensive line
- Cory Patterson – Running backs
- Sean Snyder – Punters and kickers
- D. J. Tialavea – Tight ends
- Rob Glass – Strength and conditioning
- Grant Garner – Offensive quality control
- David Glidden – Offensive quality control
- Gunnar Gundy – Offensive quality control
- KC Gundy – Offensive quality control
- Tracin Wallace – Offensive quality control
- J. W. Walsh – Offensive quality control
- Stan Eggen – Defensive quality control
- Dean Marlowe – Defensive quality control
- Ryan McNamara – Defensive quality control
- Bradley Thomas – Defensive quality control
- Kevie Thompson – Defensive quality control
- Gary Walker – Defensive quality control
- Joseph Foteh – Special teams analyst
- Gary Gibbs – Defensive analyst
- Chris Thurmond – Offensive analyst
- Rod Johnson – Director, football operations
- Jon Pickle – Assistant director of football operations
- Richetti Jones – Director, player development
- Todd Bradford – Director, football recruiting
- Josh Gonzales – Assistant recruiting director, offense/prospect analyst – WR
- Addy Lovett – Manager, on-campus recruiting
- Beni Tonga – Player development specialist/prospect analyst – TE/FB
- Zach Allen – Prospect analyst – OL
- Colby Ellis – Prospect analyst – DB
- Justin Gordon – Prospect analyst – LB
- D. J. Linton – Prospect analyst – DL
- Cameron O'Neal – Prospect analyst – DB
- Cameron Winston – Prospect analyst – RB

Legend

- (C) Team captain
- (S) Suspended
- (I) Ineligible
- Injured
- Redshirt

Roster

== Game summaries ==
=== vs UT Martin (FCS) ===
UT Martin Skyhawks (FCS) (0–0) at Oklahoma State Cowboys (0–0) – Game summary

Quarter	1	2	3	4	Total
Skyhawks (FCS)	7	0	0	0	7
Cowboys	14	3	3	7	27

at Boone Pickens Stadium • Stillwater, Oklahoma

- Date: August 28
- Game time: 6:30 p.m.
- Game weather: Cloudy • Temperature: 77 °F (25 °C) • Wind: NE at 9 mph (14 km/h)
- Game attendance: 44,809
- Referee: Luke Richmond
- TV announcers (ESPN+): James Westling (play-by-play) and Leger Douzable (analyst)

Game information

First quarter

- (11:24) OKST – Hauss Hejny 11-yard run, Logan Ward kick (Drive: 10 plays, 71 yards, 3:33; OKST 7–0)
- (4:03) OKST – Gavin Freeman 10-yard pass from Hauss Hejny, Logan Ward kick (Drive: 9 plays, 93 yards, 3:36; OKST 14–0)
- (2:15) UTM – John Gentry 39-yard pass from Bryce Bailey, Cade Hechter kick (Drive: 4 plays, 65 yards, 1:42; OKST 14–7)

Second quarter

- (2:46) OKST – Logan Ward 42-yard field goal (Drive: 13 plays, 43 yards, 4:03; OKST 17–7)

Third quarter

- (9:32) OKST – Logan Ward 39-yard field goal (Drive: 9 plays, 58 yards, 4:24; OKST 20–7)

Fourth quarter

- (9:35) OKST – Sesi Vailahi 9-yard run, Logan Ward kick (Drive: 12 plays, 58 yard,s 5:01; OKST 27–7)

Statistics	UTM	OKST
First downs	13	20
Plays–yards	55–225	72–359
Rushes–yards	38–116	42–127
Passing yards	209	232
Passing: comp–att–int	10–17–1	18–30
Turnovers	1	0
Time of possession	28:39	31:21

Team	Category	Player	Statistics
UT Martin	Passing	Jase Bauer	9/16, 70 yards, INT
UT Martin	Rushing	John Gentry	16 carries, 51 yards
UT Martin	Receiving	John Gentry	2 receptions, 45 yards, TD
Oklahoma State	Passing	Zane Flores	13/20, 136 yards
Oklahoma State	Rushing	Kalib Hicks	21 carries, 56 yards
Oklahoma State	Receiving	Terrill Davis	2 receptions, 75 yards

=== at No. 6 Oregon ===
Oklahoma State Cowboys (1–0) at No. 6 Oregon Ducks (1–0) – Game summary

Quarter	1	2	3	4	Total
Cowboys	0	3	0	0	3
No. 6 Ducks	20	21	28	0	69

at Autzen Stadium • Eugene, Oregon

- Date: September 6
- Game time: 2:30 p.m.
- Game weather: Cloudy • Temperature: 70 °F (21 °C) • Wind: W at 3 mph (4.8 km/h)
- Game attendance: 57,266
- Referee: Stephen Baron
- TV announcers (CBS): Brad Nessler (play-by-play), Gary Danielson (analyst), and Jenny Dell (sideline)

Game information

First quarter

- (14:20) ORE – Noah Whittington 59-yard run, Atticus Sappington kick (Drive: 2 plays, 65 yards, 0:40; ORE 7–0)
- (13:24) ORE – Dakorien Moore 65-yard pass from Dante Moore (Drive: 1 play, 65 yards, 0:12; ORE 13–0)
- (5:04) ORE – Dierre Hill Jr. 19-yard run, Atticus Sappington kick (Drive: 4 plays, 80 yards, 2:11; ORE 20–0)

Second quarter

- (12:08) OKST – Logan Ward 23-yard field goal (Drive:16 plays, 69 yards, 7:56; ORE 20–3)
- (9:39) ORE – Malik Benson 42 yard pass from Dante Moore, Atticus Sappington kick (Drive: 5 plays, 75 yards, 2:29; ORE 27–3)
- (5:46) ORE – Dakorien Moore 25-yard run, Atticus Sappington kick (Drive: 5 plays, 63 yards, 2:05; ORE 34–3)
- (0:11) ORE – Jayden Limar 5-yard run, Atticus Sappington kick (Drive: 12 plays, 76 yards, 4:09; ORE 41–3)

Third quarter

- (9:20) ORE – Gary Bryant Jr. 11-yard pass from Dante Moore, Gage Hurych kick (Drive: 10 plays, 63 yards, 4:20; ORE 48–3)
- (1:17) ORE – Jordon Davison 1-yard run, Gage Hurych kick (Drive: 4 plays, 55 yards, 1:37; ORE 55–3)
- (1:09) ORE – Jerry Mison 26-yard interception return, Gage Hurych kick (Drive 1 play, 0 yards, 0:08; ORE 62–3)
- (0:27) ORE – Peyton Woodyard 28-yard interception return, Gage Hurych kick (Drive: 2 plays, 3 yards, 0:42; ORE 69–3)

Fourth quarter

- No scoring plays.

Statistics	OKST	ORE
First downs	9	24
Plays–yards	61–211	62–631
Rushes–yards	42–144	37–312
Passing yards	67	319
Passing: comp–att–int	7–19–2	18–25–0
Turnovers	2	0
Time of possession	31:19	28:41

Team	Category	Player	Statistics
Oklahoma State	Passing	Zane Flores	7/19, 67 yards
Oklahoma State	Rushing	Kalib Hicks	14 carries, 63 yards
Oklahoma State	Receiving	Christi Fitzpatrick	2 receptions, 34 yards
Oregon	Passing	Dante Moore	16/21, 266 yards, 3 TD
Oregon	Rushing	Noah Whittington	4 carries, 91 yards, TD
Oregon	Receiving	Gary Bryant Jr.	3 receptions, 46 yards, TD

=== vs Tulsa (rivalry) ===
Tulsa Golden Hurricane (1–2) at Oklahoma State Cowboys (1–1) – Game summary

Quarter	1	2	3	4	Total
Golden Hurricane	10	6	3	0	19
Cowboys	3	0	0	9	12

at Boone Pickens Stadium • Stillwater, Oklahoma

- Date: September 19
- Game time: 6:30 p.m.
- Game weather: Sunny • Temperature: 88 °F (31 °C) • Wind: SE at 8 mph (13 km/h)
- Game attendance: 48,842
- Referee: Kevin Randall
- TV announcers (ESPN): Anish Shroff (play-by-play), Andre Ware (analyst) and Paul Carcaterra (sideline)

Game information

First quarter

- (11:45) OKST – Logan Ward 35-yard field goal (Drive: 9 plays, 57 yards, 3:15; Oklahoma State 3–0)
- (9:36) TLSA – Braylin Presley 19-yard pass from Baylor Hayes, Seth Morgan kick (Drive: 6 plays, 75 yards, 2:09; Tulsa 7–3)
- (2:41) TLSA – Seth Morgan 27-yard field goal (Drive: 15 plays, 60 yards, 5:51; Tulsa 10–3)

Second quarter

- (7:49) TLSA – Seth Morgan 38-yard field goal (Drive: 16 plays, 67 yards, 6:22; Tulsa 13–3)
- (2:32) TLSA – Seth Morgan 47-yard field goal (Drive: 11 plays, 41 yards, 3:44; Tulsa 16–3)

Third quarter

- (11:14) TLSA – Seth Morgan 47-yard field goal (Drive: 10 plays, 46 yards, 3:46; Tulsa 19–3)

Fourth quarter

- (14:14) OKST – Zane Flores 5-yard run, pass failed (Drive: 8 plays, 65 yards, 3:01; Tulsa 19–9)
- (5:49) OKST – Logan Ward 49-yard field goal (Drive: 6 plays, 24 yards, 1:00; Tulsa 19–12)

Statistics	TLSA	OKST
First downs	21	24
Plays–yards	79–424	75–403
Rushes–yards	43–205	33–185
Passing yards	219	218
Passing: comp–att–int	23–26	26–42
Turnovers	1	0
Time of possession	34:45	25:15

Team	Category	Player	Statistics
Tulsa	Passing	Baylor Hayes	23/36, 219 yards, TD
Tulsa	Rushing	Dominic Richardson	31 carries, 146 yards
Tulsa	Receiving	Brody Foley	4 receptions, 59 yards
Oklahoma State	Passing	Zane Flores	25/40, 214 yards
Oklahoma State	Rushing	Rodney Fields Jr.	17 carries, 113 yards
Oklahoma State	Receiving	Christian Fitzpatrick	4 receptions, 49 yards

=== vs Baylor ===
Baylor Bears (2–2) at Oklahoma State Cowboys (1–2) – Game summary

Quarter	1	2	3	4	Total
Bears	7	21	7	10	45
Cowboys	7	13	7	0	27

at Boone Pickens Stadium • Stillwater, Oklahoma

- Date: September 27
- Game time: 2:30 p.m.
- Game weather: Sunny • Temperature: 90 °F (32 °C) • Wind: SW at 8 mph (13 km/h)
- Game attendance: 45,689
- Referee: Henry Johns
- TV announcers (ESPN2): Lowell Galindo (play-by-play), Aaron Murray (analyst) and Lauren Sisler (sideline)

Game information

First quarter

- (12:27) BAY – Kole Wilson 34-yard pass from Swayer Robertson, Connor Hawkins kick (Drive: 3 plays, 78 yards, 1:11; BAY 7–0)
- (6:54) OSU – Josh Ford 26-yard pass from Sam Jackson V, Logan Ward kick (Drive: 12 plays, 75 yards, 5:33; Tied 7–7)

Second quarter

- (14:53) BAY – Bryson Washington 19-yard run, Connor Hawkins kick (Drive: 7 plays, 64 yards, 1:52; BAY 14–7)
- (11:31) OSU – Logan Ward 39-yard field goal (Drive: 10 plays, 75 yards, 3:22; BAY 14–10)
- (9:08) BAY – Matthew Klopfenstein 6-yard pass from Sawyer Robertson, Connor Hawkins kick (Drive: 6 plays, 78 yards, 2:17; BAY 21–10)
- (8:12) OSU – Trent Howland 10-yard run, Logan Ward kick (Drive: 3 plays, 75 yards, 0:56; BAY 21–17)
- (3:40) BAY – Michael Trigg 10-yard pass from Sawyer Robertson, Connor Hawkins kick (Drive: 7 plays, 56 yards, 2:21; BAY 28–17)
- (1:02) OSU – Logan Ward 42-yard field goal (Drive: 12 plays, 58 yards, 2:32; BAY 28–20)

Third quarter

- (14:10) BAY – Kobe Prentice 73-yard pass from Sawyer Robertson, Connor Hawkins kick (Drive: 3 plays, 86 yards, 0:45; BAY 35–20)
- (5:22) OSU – Trent Howland 1-yard run, Logan Ward kick (Drive: 5 plays, 55 yards, 2:01; BAY 35–27)

Fourth quarter

- (14:49) BAY – Connor Hawkins 36-yard field goal (Drive: 12 plays, 56 yards, 5:33; BAY 38–27)
- (6:31) BAY – Sawyer Robertson 2-yard run, Connor Hawkins kick (Drive: 14 plays, 89 yards, 5:29; BAY 45–27)

Statistics	BAY	OKST
First downs	29	22
Plays–yards	74–612	78–448
Rushes–yards	39–219	32–157
Passing yards	393	291
Passing: comp–att–int	24–35	27–46
Turnovers	1	0
Time of possession	31:52	28:08

Team	Category	Player	Statistics
Baylor	Passing	Sawyer Robertson	24/35, 393 yards, 4 TD
Baylor	Rushing	Caden Knighten	5 carries, 81 yards
Baylor	Receiving	Josh Cameron	6 receptions, 98 yards
Oklahoma State	Passing	Zane Flores	23/41, 232 yards
Oklahoma State	Rushing	Trent Howland	16 carries, 84 yards, 2 TD
Oklahoma State	Receiving	Shamar Rigby	5 receptions, 84 yards

=== at Arizona ===
Oklahoma State Cowboys (1–3) at Arizona Wildcats (3–1) – Game summary

Quarter	1	2	3	4	Total
Cowboys	3	3	0	7	13
Wildcats	14	10	14	3	41

at Arizona Stadium • Tucson, Arizona

- Date: October 4
- Game time: 2:00 p.m.
- Game weather: Sunny • Temperature: 85 °F (29 °C)
- Game attendance: 40,685
- Referee: Luke Richmond
- TV announcers (TNT): J.B. Long (play-by-play), Mike Golic Jr. (analyst) and Jared Greenberg (sideline)

Game information

First quarter

- (10:08) ARIZ – Tre Spivey 13-yard pass from Noah Fifita, Michael Salgado-Medina kick (Drive: 11 plays, 75 yards, 4:52; Arizona 7–0)
- (5:59) OKST – Logan Ward 47-yard field goal (Drive: 6 plays, 31 yards, 1:10; Arizona 7–3)
- (1:26) ARIZ – Tre Spivey 22-yard pass from Noah Fifita, Michael Salgado-Medina kick (Drive: 10 plays, 75 yards, 4:33; Arizona 14–3)

Second quarter

- (6:20) ARIZ – Luke Wysong 47-yard pass from Noah Fifita, Michael Salgado-Medina kick (Drive: 6 plays, 83 yards, 3:10; Arizona 21–3)
- (1:05) OKST – Logan Ward 46-yard field goal (Drive: 7 plays, 18 yards, 2:37; Arizona 21–6)
- (0:00) ARIZ – Michael Salgado-Medina 34-yard field goal (Drive: 8 plays, 59 yards, 1:05; Arizona 24–6)

Third quarter

- (2:58) ARIZ – Javin Whatley 21-yard pass from Noah Fifita, Michael Salgado-Medina kick (Drive: 3 plays, 38 yards, 1:14; Arizona 31–6)
- (1:51) ARIZ – Chris Hunter 29-yard pass from Noah Fifita, Michael Salgado-Medina kick (Drive: 1 play, 29 yards, 0:07; Arizona 38–6)

Fourth quarter

- (8:40) OKST – LaDainian Fields 55-yard interception return, Logan Ward kick (Arizona 38–13)
- (4:12) ARIZ – Michael Salgado-Medina 57-yard field goal (Drive: 9 plays, 36 yards, 4:28; Arizona 41–13)

Statistics	OKST	ARIZ
First downs	7	28
Plays–yards	59–158	76–478
Rushes–yards	31–89	33–45
Passing yards	69	433
Passing: comp–att–int	13–28–1	31–43–2
Turnovers	2	3
Time of possession	25:30	34:30

Team	Category	Player	Statistics
Oklahoma State	Passing	Zane Flores	9/20, 47 yards, INT
Oklahoma State	Rushing	Zane Flores	5 carries, 31 yards
Oklahoma State	Receiving	Gavin Freeman	3 receptions, 26 yards
Arizona	Passing	Noah Fifita	28/38, 376 yards, 5 TD, INT
Arizona	Rushing	Ismail Mahdi	14 carries, 34 yards
Arizona	Receiving	Luke Wysong	5 receptions, 92 yards, TD

=== vs Houston ===
Houston Cougars (4–1) at Oklahoma State Cowboys (1–4) – Game summary

Quarter	1	2	3	4	Total
Cougars	10	14	9	6	39
Cowboys	7	3	0	7	17

at Boone Pickens Stadium • Stillwater, Oklahoma

- Date: October 11
- Game time: 11:00 a.m.
- Game weather: Sunny • Temperature: 80 °F (27 °C) • Wind: SW at 6 mph (9.7 km/h)
- Game attendance: 44,941
- Referee: Salaam Tutashinda
- TV announcers (TNT): J.B. Long (play-by-play), Mike Golic Jr. (analyst) and Jared Greenberg (sideline)

Game information

First quarter

- (12:48) OKST – Rodney Fields Jr. 62-yard pass from Sharmar Rigby, Logan Ward kick (Drive: 5 plays, 75 yards, 2:23; OKST 7–0)
- (7:43) HOU – Conner Weigman 3-yard run, Ethan Sanchez kick (Drive: 9 plays, 78 yards, 4:50; Tied 7–7)
- (0:45) HOU – Ethan Sanchez 46-yard field goal (Drive: 10 pays, 16 yards, 3:31; HOU 10–7)

Second quarter

- (11:08) OKST – Logan Ward 37-yard field goal (Drive: 5 plays, 2 yards, 1:44; Tied 10–10)
- (5:39) HOU – Dean Connors 6-yard pass from Conner Weigman, Ethan Sanchez kick (Drive: 4 plays, 67 yards, 1:47; HOU 17–10)
- (3:20) HOU – Harvey Broussard III 14-yard pass from Conner Weigman, Ethan Sanchez kick (Drive: 4 plays, 67 yards, 1:47; HOU 24–10)

Third quarter

- (13:00) HOU – Ethan Sanchez 48-yard field goal (Drive: 7 plays, 45 yards, 2:00; HOU 27–10)
- (8:27) HOU – Ethan Sanchez 30-yard field goal (Drive: 7 plays, 68 yards, 3:15; HOU 30–10)
- (0:35) HOU – Dean Connors 2-yard run (Drive: 11 plays, 53 yards, 4:55; HOU 36–10)

Fourth quarter

- (7:43) HOU – Ethan Sanchez 29-yard field goal (Drive: 13 plays, 51 yards, 5:17; HOU 39–10)
- (3:55) OKST – Gavin Freeman 33-yard pass from Noah Walters, Logan Ward kick (Drive: 10 plays, 75 yards, 3:48; HOU 39–17)

Statistics	HOU	OKST
First downs	25	10
Plays–yards	79–485	51–225
Rushes–yards	45–166	31–45
Passing yards	319	180
Passing: comp–att–int	24–34	9–20–1
Turnovers	0	1
Time of possession	36:28	23:32

Team	Category	Player	Statistics
Houston	Passing	Conner Weigman	21/30, 306 yards, 2 TD
Houston	Rushing	Dean Connors	15 carries, 83 yards, TD
Houston	Receiving	Amare Thomas	7 receptions, 157 yards
Oklahoma State	Passing	Sam Jackson V	7/16, 84 yards, INT
Oklahoma State	Rushing	Rodney Fields Jr.	14 carries, 44 yards
Oklahoma State	Receiving	Rodney Fields Jr.	2 receptions, 63 yards, TD

=== vs No. 24 Cincinnati ===
No. 24 Cincinnati Bearcats (5–1) at Oklahoma State Cowboys (1–5) – Game summary

Quarter	1	2	3	4	Total
No. 24 Bearcats	7	21	0	21	49
Cowboys	3	7	7	0	17

at Boone Pickens Stadium • Stillwater, Oklahoma

- Date: October 18
- Game time: 7:00 p.m.
- Game weather: Sunny • Temperature: 70 °F (21 °C) • Wind: N at 7 mph (11 km/h)
- Game attendance: 46,901
- Referee: Michael VanderVelde
- TV announcers (ESPN2): Mike Monaco (play-by-play), Kirk Morrison (analyst), and Dawn Davenport (sideline)

Game information

First quarter

- (11:54) CIN – Cyrus Allen 26-yard pass from Brendan Sorsby, Stephen Rusnak kick (Drive: 5 plays, 79 yards, 1:58; CIN 7–0)
- (4:10) OKST – Logan Ward 40-yard field goal (Drive: 15 plays, 69 yards, 7:40; CIN 7–3)

Second quarter

- (14:54) CIN – Cyrus Allen 14-yard pass from Brendan Sorsby, Stephen Rusnak kick (Drive: 9 plays, 71 yards, 4:11; CIN 14–3)
- (11:12) OKST – Sam Jackson V 6-yard run, Logan Ward kick (Drive: 7 plays, 75 yards, 3:42; CIN 14–10)
- (8:44) CIN – Joe Royer 27-yard pass from Brendan Sorsby, Stephen Rusnak kick (Drive: 8 plays, 86 yards, 2:25; CIN 21–10)
- (0:13) CIN – Cyrus Allen 12-yard pass from Brendan Sorsby, Stephen Rusnak kick (Drive: 12 plays, 94 yards, 2:15; CIN 28–10)

Third quarter

- (10:39) OKST – Rodney Fields Jr. 20-yard run, Logan Ward kick (Drive: 5 plays, 62 yards, 2:27; CIN 28–17)

Fourth quarter

- (13:21) CIN – Brendan Sorsby 1-yard run, Stephen Rusnak kick (Drive: 12 plays, 95 yards, 4:05; CIN 35–17)
- (6:05) CIN – Matthew McDoom 100-yard interception return, Stephen Rusnak kick (CIN 42–17)
- (4:39) CIN – Manny Covey 9-yard run, Stephen Rusnak kick (Drive: 2 plays, 13 yards, 0:32; CIN 49–17)

Statistics	CIN	OKST
First downs	25	20
Plays–yards	60–427	67–377
Rushes–yards	31–157	48–228
Passing yards	270	149
Passing: comp–att–int	20–29	11–19–1
Turnovers	0	2
Time of possession	23:18	36:42

Team	Category	Player	Statistics
Cincinnati	Passing	Brendan Sorsby	20/29, 270 yards, 3 TD
Cincinnati	Rushing	Evan Pryor	9 carries, 63 yards
Cincinnati	Receiving	Joe Royer	5 receptions, 63 yards, TD
Oklahoma State	Passing	Sam Jackson V	11/19, 149 yards, INT
Oklahoma State	Rushing	Rodney Fields Jr.	21 carries, 163 yards, TD
Oklahoma State	Receiving	Shamar Rigby	1 reception, 48 yards

=== at No. 14 Texas Tech ===
Oklahoma State Cowboys (1–6) at No. 14 Texas Tech Red Raiders (6–1) – Game summary

Quarter	1	2	3	4	Total
Cowboys	0	0	0	0	0
No. 14 Red Raiders	21	7	14	0	42

at Jones AT&T Stadium • Lubbock, Texas

- Date: October 25
- Game time: 3:00 p.m.
- Game weather: Cloudy • Temperature: 69 °F (21 °C) • Wind: NE at 7 mph (11 km/h)
- Game attendance: 59,625
- Referee: David Alvarez
- TV announcers (ESPNU): Justin Kutcher (play-by-play) and Dustin Fox (analyst)

Game information

First quarter

- (14:46) TTU – J'Koby Williams 99 yard kickoff return, Upton Bellenfant kick (Drive: 1 play, 99 yards, 0:00; TTU 7–0)
- (12:56) TTU – J'Koby Williams 26 yard pass from Will Hammond (Drive: 1 play, 26 yards, 0:11; TTU 13–0)
- (1:30) TTU – Cameron Dickey 7 yard rush, Cameron Dickey rush (Drive: 13 plays, 82 yards, 5:48; TTU 21–0)

Second quarter

- (5:30) TTU – Jacob Rodriguez 69 yard fumble recovery, Upton Bellenfant kick (Drive: 4 plays, -58 yards, 1:46; TTU 28–0)

Third quarter

- (9:25) TTU – Caleb Douglas 42 yard pass from Mitch Griffis, Stone Harrington kick (Drive: 8 plays, 83 yards, 3:17; TTU 35–0)
- (3:17) TTU – Mitch Griffis 1 yard rush, Stone Harrington kick (Drive: 8 plays, 80 yards, 3:38; TTU 42–0)

Fourth quarter

- No Scoring Plays

Statistics	OKST	TTU
First downs	9	21
Plays–yards	63–182	69–370
Rushes–yards	32–95	40–88
Passing yards	87	282
Passing: comp–att–int	14–31–0	19–29–0
Turnovers	2	2
Time of possession	28:44	31:16

Team	Category	Player	Statistics
Oklahoma State	Passing	Sam Jackson V	9/19, 48 yards
Oklahoma State	Rushing	Trent Howland	13 carries, 58 yards
Oklahoma State	Receiving	Gavin Freeman	6 receptions, 47 yards
Texas Tech	Passing	Mitch Griffis	9/13, 172 yards, TD
Texas Tech	Rushing	Cameron Dickey	13 carries, 47 yards, TD
Texas Tech	Receiving	Caleb Douglas	5 receptions, 98 yards, TD

=== at Kansas ===
Oklahoma State Cowboys (1–7) at Kansas Jayhawks (4–4) – Game summary

Quarter	1	2	3	4	Total
Cowboys	7	0	7	7	21
Jayhawks	3	7	14	14	38

at David Booth Kansas Memorial Stadium • Lawrence, Kansas

- Date: November 1
- Game time: 3:00 p.m.
- Game weather: Cloudy • Temperature: 49 °F (9 °C) • Wind: NW at 10 mph (16 km/h)
- Game attendance: 39,511
- Referee: Stephen Barron
- TV announcers (ESPN+): Mark Neely (play-by-play) and Leger Douzable (analyst)

Game information

First quarter

- (10:40) OKST – Shamar Rigby 12-yard pass from Zane Flores, Logan Ward kick (Drive: 10 plays, 75 yards, 4:20; OKST 7–0)
- (3:56) KAN – Laith Marjan 39-yard field goal (Drive: 13 plays, 59 yards, 6:40; OKST 7–3)

Second quarter

- (3:23) KAN – Daniel Hishaw Jr. 3-yard run, Laith Marjan kick (Drive: 15 plays, 73 yards, 6:55; KAN 10–7)

Third quarter

- (10:19) KAN – Boden Groen 3-yard pass from Jalon Daniels, Laith Marjan kick (Drive: 10 plays, 75 yards, 4:41; KAN 17–7)
- (6:55) KAN – Bryson Canty 5-yard pass from Jalon Daniels, Latin Marjan kick (Drive: 3 plays, 54 yards, 1:22; KAN 24–7)
- (1:55) OKST – Gavin Freeman 10-yard pass from Zane Flores, Logan Ward kick (Drive: 10 plays, 75 yards, 5:00; KAN 24–14)

Fourth quarter

- (13:49) KAN – Daniel Hishaw Jr. 3-yard run, Laith Marjan kick (Drive: 6 plays, 44 yards, 2:57; KAN 31–14)
- (6:04) KAN – Leshon Williams 5-yard run, Laith Marjan kick (Drive: 10 plays, 39 yards, 6:31; KAN 38–14)
- (1:19) OKST – Sesi Vailahi 2-yard run, Logan Ward kick (Drive: 11 plays, 75 yards, 4:45; KAN 38–21)

Statistics	OKST	KU
First downs	19	18
Plays–yards	62–316	58–342
Rushes–yards	31–72	59–232
Passing yards	244	110
Passing: comp–att–int	24–31–0	13–19–0
Turnovers	0	0
Time of possession	29:22	30:38

Team	Category	Player	Statistics
Oklahoma State	Passing	Zane Flores	22/28, 235 yards, 2 TD
Oklahoma State	Rushing	Rodney Fields Jr.	15 carries, 56 yards
Oklahoma State	Receiving	Gavin Freeman	7 receptions, 78 yards, TD
Kansas	Passing	Jalon Daniels	13/19, 110 yards, 2 TD, INT
Kansas	Rushing	Leshon Willians	14 carries, 77 yards, TD
Kansas	Receiving	Leyton Cure	2 receptions, 32 yards

=== vs Kansas State ===
Kansas State Wildcats (4–5) at Oklahoma State Cowboys (1–8) – Game summary

Quarter	1	2	3	4	Total
Wildcats	0	7	0	7	14
Cowboys	3	3	0	0	6

at Boone Pickens Stadium • Stillwater, Oklahoma

- Date: November 15
- Game time: 11:00 a.m.
- Game weather: Sunny • Temperature: 77 °F (25 °C) • Wind: SW at 17 mph (27 km/h)
- Game attendance: 46,340
- Referee: Kevin Boitmann
- TV announcers (ESPNU): Richard Cross (play-by-play) and Charles Arbuckle (analyst)

Game information

First quarter

- (8:37) OKST – Logan Ward 47-yard field goal (Drive: 8 plays, 39 yards, 3:49; OKST 3–0)

Second quarter

- (14:55) OKST – Logan Ward 47-yard field goal (Drive: 9 plays, 54 yards, 4:09; OKST 6–0)
- (7:07) KSU – Jayce Brown 34-yard pass from Avery Johnson, Luis Rodriguez kick (Drive: 4 plays, 48 yards, 1:28; KSU 7–6)

Third quarter

- No scoring plays.

Fourth quarter

- (12:31) KSU – Joe Jackson 15-yard run, Luis Rodriguez kick (Drive: 10 plays, 70 yards, 4:05; KSU 14–6)

Statistics	KSU	OKST
First downs	14	23
Plays–yards	58–284	67–373
Rushes–yards	30–107	29–147
Passing yards	177	266
Passing: comp–att–int	15–28–1	25–38–3
Turnovers	1	5
Time of possession	29:27	30:33

Team	Category	Player	Statistics
Kansas State	Passing	Avery Johnson	15/28, 177 yards, TD, INT
Kansas State	Rushing	Joe Jackson	14 carries, 69 yards, TD
Kansas State	Receiving	Jayce Brown	3 receptions, 82 yards, TD
Oklahoma State	Passing	Zane Flores	24/36, 233 yards, 2 INT
Oklahoma State	Rushing	Rodney Fields Jr.	14 carries, 51 yards
Oklahoma State	Receiving	Terrill Davis	4 receptions, 55 yards

=== at UCF ===
Oklahoma State Cowboys (1–9) at UCF Knights (4–6) – Game summary

Quarter	1	2	3	4	Total
Cowboys	7	7	0	0	14
Knights	0	0	7	10	17

at Acrisure Bounce House • Orlando, Florida

- Date: November 22
- Game time: 3:00 p.m.
- Game weather: Sunny • Temperature: 83 °F (28 °C) • Wind: E at 3 mph (4.8 km/h)
- Game attendance: 41,723
- Referee: Salaam Tutashinda
- TV announcers (ESPN+): Brian Custer (play-by-play) & Leger Douzable (analyst)

Game information

First quarter

- OKST – Gavin Freeman 5-yard pass from Zane Flores (Logan Ward kick), 8:06, Cowboys 7–0. Drive: 13 plays, 75 yards, 6:54.

Second quarter

- OKST – Zane Flores 6-yard run (Logan Ward kick), 0:50, Cowboys 14–0. Drive: 12 plays, 77 yards, 5:35.

Third quarter

- UCF – Dylan Wade 83-yard pass from Tayven Jackson (Noe Ruelas kick), 14:39, Cowboys 14–7. Drive: 1 play, 83 yards, 0:13.

Fourth quarter

- UCF – Dylan Wade 2-yard pass from Tayven Jackson (Noe Ruelas kick), 9:12, Tied 14–14. Drive: 8 plays, 45 yards, 3:43.
- UCF – Noe Ruelas 34-yard field goal, 0:57, Knights 17–14. Drive: 10 plays, 73 yards, 5:49.

Statistics	OKST	UCF
First downs	13	16
Plays–yards	58–228	61–396
Rushes–yards	30–104	36–125
Passing yards	124	271
Passing: comp–att–int	13–28–1	16–25–2
Turnovers	1	2
Time of possession	28:32	31:28

Team	Category	Player	Statistics
Oklahoma State	Passing	Zane Flores	13/28, 124 yards, 1 TD, 1 INT
Oklahoma State	Rushing	Rodney Fields Jr.	19 carries, 87 yards
Oklahoma State	Receiving	Gavin Freeman	5 receptions, 40 yards, 1 TD
UCF	Passing	Tayven Jackson	16/25, 271 yards, 2 TD, 2 INT
UCF	Rushing	Myles Montgomery	18 carries, 81 yards
UCF	Receiving	Dylan Wade	4 receptions, 145 yards, 2 TD

=== vs Iowa State ===
Iowa State Cyclones (7–4) at Oklahoma State Cowboys (1–10) – Game summary

Quarter	1	2	3	4	Total
Cyclones	3	7	7	3	20
Cowboys	0	7	3	3	13

at Boone Pickens Stadium • Stillwater, Oklahoma

- Date: November 29
- Game time: 11:00 a.m.
- Game weather: Cloudy • Temperature: 51 °F (11 °C) • Wind: NW at 25 mph (40 km/h)
- Game attendance: 35,127
- Referee: Henry Johns
- TV announcers (ESPNU): Richard Cross (play-by-play) and Craig Haubert (analyst)

Game information

First quarter

- (1:35) ISU – Kyle Konrardy 45-yard field goal (Drive: 12 plays, 38 yards, 6:18; ISU 3–0)

Second quarter

- (8:11) ISU – Chase Sowell 16-yard pass from Rocco Becht, Kyle Konrardy kick (Drive: 4 plays, 46 yards, 2:08; ISU 10–0)
- (1:21) OKST – Trent Howland 8-yard run, Logan Ward kick (Drive: 14 plays, 80 yards, 6:46; ISU 10–7)

Third quarter

- (10:39) ISU – Abu Sama III 40-yard run, Kyle Konrardy kick (Drive: 4 plays, 79 yards, 1:27; ISU 17–7)
- (5:31) OKST – Logan Ward 28-yard field goal (Drive: 4 plays, 3 yards, 2:05; ISU 17–10)

Fourth quarter

- (11:31) OKST – Kyle Konrardy 34-yard field goal (Drive: 7 plays, 34 yards, 0:17; ISU 20–10)
- (3:50) OKST – Logan Ward 41-yard field goal (Drive: 9 plays, 33 yards, 4:04; ISU 20–13)

Statistics	ISU	OKST
First downs	17	12
Plays–yards	66–344	57–229
Rushes–yards	47–231	23–27
Passing yards	113	202
Passing: comp–att–int	9–19–0	23–34–1
Turnovers	1	2
Time of possession	32:59	27:01

Team	Category	Player	Statistics
Iowa State	Passing	Rocco Becht	8/17, 94 yards, TD
Iowa State	Rushing	Carson Hansen	24 carries, 109 yards
Iowa State	Receiving	Chase Sowell	4 receptions, 54 yards, TD
Oklahoma State	Passing	Zane Flores	19/30, 166 yards, INT
Oklahoma State	Rushing	Trent Howland	14 carries, 37 yards, TD
Oklahoma State	Receiving	Terrill Davis	5 receptions, 57 yards
