= Zane Flores =

American football player

No. 6 – Iowa State Cyclones
- Position: Quarterback
- Class: Redshirt Sophomore

Personal information
- Born: Gretna, Nebraska, U.S.
- Listed height: 6 ft 3 in (1.91 m)
- Listed weight: 215 lb (98 kg)

Career information
- High school: Gretna (Gretna, Nebraska)
- College: Oklahoma State (2023–2025); Iowa State (2026–present)
- Stats at ESPN

Zane Flores is an American college football quarterback for the Iowa State Cyclones. He previously played for the Oklahoma State Cowboys.

== Early life ==
Flores attended Gretna High School in Gretna, Nebraska. He was rated as a three-star recruit and committed to play college football for the Oklahoma State Cowboys over Nebraska.

== College career ==
As a freshman in 2023, Flores did not play in any games and took a redshirt. He missed the entire 2024 season due to a lower leg injury. Heading into the 2025 season, Flores competed with TCU transfer Hauss Hejny for the Cowboys starting quarterback job. Flores lost the competition, but an injury to Hejny forced him into the opener, where he completed 13 of 20 passes for 136 yards in a win over UT Martin. After the game, it was announced that Hejny would be out for an extended period of time, giving Flores the starting job.

=== College statistics ===
Season	Team	Games			Passing								Rushing			
Season	Team	GP	GS	Record	Cmp	Att	Pct	Yds	Avg	TD	Int	Rtg	Att	Yds	Avg	TD
2023	Oklahoma State	Redshirt (redshirt)														
2024	Oklahoma State	Did not play due to injury														
2025	Oklahoma State	9	8	0–8	159	266	59.8	1,490	5.6	3	7	105.3	52	117	2.3	2
Career		9	8	0–8	159	266	59.8	1,490	5.6	3	7	105.3	52	117	2.3	2
