= Hauss Hejny =

American football player (born 2005)

No. 8 – Colorado State Rams
- Position: Quarterback
- Class: Redshirt Sophomore

Personal information
- Born: December 14, 2005 (age 20)
- Listed height: 6 ft 0 in (1.83 m)
- Listed weight: 190 lb (86 kg)

Career information
- High school: Aledo (Aledo, Texas)
- College: TCU (2024); Oklahoma State (2025); Colorado State (2026–present)
- Stats at ESPN

Hauss Hejny (born December 14, 2005) is an American college football quarterback for the Colorado State Rams. He previously played for the TCU Horned Frogs and Oklahoma State Cowboys.

== Early life ==
Hejny attended Aledo High School in Aledo, Texas, where he won two state championships. As a junior, he completed 117 of 187 passing attempts for 2,094 yards and 20 touchdowns and rushed for 1,276 yards and 15 touchdowns. As a senior, Hejny completed 66% of his passes for 2,773 yards and rushed for 1,041 yards, accounting for 40 total touchdowns and earning 2023 Fort Worth-area Offensive Player of the Year honors. He initially committed to play college football for the Duke Blue Devils before he flipped his pick to the TCU Horned Frogs.

== College career ==
=== TCU ===
In the 2024 regular season finale, Hejny rushed for 48 yards versus Cincinnati. During the 2024 season, he played in four games, where he rushed 15 times for 65 yards, but did not attempts any passes. After the season, Hejny entered his name into the NCAA transfer portal.

=== Oklahoma State ===
He transferred to play for the Oklahoma State Cowboys. Heading into the 2025 season, Hejny was competing to be the Cowboys starting quarterback. Hejny started the first game of the season against UT Martin, but exited in the first quarter with a broken foot. He did not appear in a game for the remainder of the season. On January 1, 2026, Hejny announced he would enter the transfer portal.

=== Colorado State ===
On January 5, 2026, Hejny committed to transfer to Colorado State.

=== Statistics ===
Year	Team	Games			Passing								Rushing			
Year	Team	GP	GS	Record	Comp	Att	Pct	Yards	Avg	TD	Int	Rate	Att	Yards	Avg	TD
2024	TCU	4	0	–	0	0	0.0	0	0.0	0	0	0.0	15	65	4.3	0
2025	Oklahoma State	1	1	1–0	5	10	50.0	96	9.6	1	0	163.6	4	27	6.8	1
2026	Colorado State	5	5	3–2	90	134	67.2	1,138	8.5	14	2	170.1	30	208	6.9	3
Career		10	6	4–2	95	144	66.0	1,234	8.6	15	2	169.5	49	300	6.1	4

== Personal life ==
His father, Jesse Hejny played as a defensive lineman for TCU, while his mother JimAnne played basketball and ran track and field for the Horned Frogs as well.

== Accomplishments and Accolades ==
2024 All-American

2023 Whataburger Super Team

2023 Elite Alumni
