= Levi Wentz =

American football player (born 2002)

Profile
- Position: Wide receiver

Personal information
- Born: April 25, 2002 (age 24); Pittsburgh, Pennsylvania, U.S.
- Listed height: 6 ft 2 in (1.88 m)
- Listed weight: 199 lb (90 kg)

Career information
- High school: Pine-Richland (Gibsonia, Pennsylvania)
- College: Old Dominion (2021–2022); Albany (2023–2024); Kansas (2025)
- NFL draft: 2026: undrafted

Career history
- Seattle Seahawks (2026)*; Pittsburgh Steelers (2026)*
- * Offseason or practice squad member only

Levi Wentz (born April 25, 2002) is an American professional football wide receiver. He played college football at Old Dominion, the Albany Great Danes, and the Kansas Jayhawks. He was signed as an undrafted free agent by the Seattle Seahawks after the 2026 NFL draft.

== Early life ==
Wentz was born in Pittsburgh, Pennsylvania and attended Pine-Richland High School in Gibsonia, Pennsylvania. He enrolled at Old Dominion in 2020, but the Monarchs canceled their football season due to the COVID-19 pandemic.

== College career ==
=== Old Dominion ===
Wentz began his collegiate career at Old Dominion. In 2021, he appeared in one game. In 2022, he played in three games and had one reception for 42 yards. He entered the transfer portal in December 2022.

=== Albany ===
Wentz transferred to Albany for the 2023 season. In 2023, he appeared in 15 games and had 16 receptions for 245 yards and one touchdown, along with one rushing attempt for −2 yards, 14 kick returns for 329 yards, and six punt returns for 45 yards. In 2024, he played in 11 games and had 40 receptions for 621 yards and one touchdown, while also deflecting one pass on special teams. He entered the transfer portal in December 2024.

=== Kansas ===
Wentz transferred to Kansas for the 2025 season. He appeared in all 12 games with six starts and had 16 receptions for 258 yards and two touchdowns. He also participated on special teams.

== Professional career ==
Pre-draft measurables
Height	Weight	Arm length	Hand span	Wingspan	40-yard dash	10-yard split	20-yard split	20-yard shuttle	Three-cone drill	Vertical jump	Broad jump
6 ft 2 3/8 in (1.89 m)	199 lb (90 kg)	31 1/2 in (0.80 m)	9 7/8 in (0.25 m)	6 ft 4 5/8 in (1.95 m)	4.57 s	1.63 s	2.67 s	4.31 s	7.03 s	34.5 in (0.88 m)	10 ft 5 in (3.18 m)
All values from Pro Day

=== Seattle Seahawks ===
On May 14, 2026, Wentz signed a three-year, $3.1 million contract with the Seattle Seahawks as an undrafted free agent. He was waived by the Seahawks on June 8.

=== Pittsburgh Steelers ===
On June 15, 2026, Wentz signed with the Pittsburgh Steelers. He was waived by the Steelers on August 29.
