= Gavin Freeman =

American football player

No. 6 – Baylor Bears
- Position: Wide receiver
- Class: Redshirt Senior

Personal information
- Listed height: 5 ft 9 in (1.75 m)
- Listed weight: 181 lb (82 kg)

Career information
- High school: Heritage Hall (Oklahoma City, Oklahoma)
- College: Oklahoma (2022–2023); Oklahoma State (2024–2025); Baylor (2026–present)
- Stats at ESPN

Gavin Freeman is an American college football wide receiver for the Baylor Bears. He previously played for the Oklahoma Sooners and Oklahoma State Cowboys.

== Early life ==
Freeman attended Heritage Hall School in Oklahoma City, Oklahoma. He committed to play college football for the Oklahoma Sooners, joining the team as a walk-on.

== College career ==
In the 2022 season opener, Freeman scored a 46-yard touchdown on his first career touch in a win against UTEP. He finished his freshman season in 2022 catching three passes for 46 yards while rushing for 71 yards and a touchdown on seven carries. In the 2023 season opener, Freeman returned a punt 82 yards for a touchdown in a win over Arkansas State. He finished the 2023 season with 19 receptions for 95 yards and a touchdown and 18 punt returns for 122 yards and a touchdown. After the season, Freeman entered the NCAA transfer portal.

Freeman transferred to play for the Oklahoma State Cowboys. He used the 2024 season to redshirt after catching six passes for 45 yards. Freeman entered the 2025 season as a starting receiver for the Cowboys. In the 2025 season opener, he recorded five receptions for 46 yards and a touchdown in a victory over UT Martin. Freeman finished the 2025 season with 53 catches for 481 yards and four touchdowns. After the season, he once again entered the NCAA transfer portal.

On January 10, 2026, Freeman announced his decision to transfer to the University of Tennessee to play for the Tennessee Volunteers. However, on January 15, he announced that he had flipped his commitment to Baylor University to play for the Baylor Bears.
